= 2010 CEV 125cc season =

Junior Motorcycle World Championship

2010 FIM JuniorGP World Championship
| Previous: | 2009 | Next: | 2011 |
Support series: CEV Moto2

The 2010 CEV 125GP is the thirteenth season of the CEV 125GP season. The season was held over 7 races at 7 meetings, beginning on 18 April at Circuit de Barcelona-Catalunya and finished on 21 November at Circuito de Jerez. Maverick Viñales won the title after beating closest rival Miguel Oliveira by 2 points.

== Calendar ==
2010 Calendar
| Round | Date | Circuit | Pole position | Fastest lap | Race winner | Winning constructor |
|---|---|---|---|---|---|---|
| 1 | 18 April | (Spain) Catalunya | (Spain) Maverick Viñales | (Spain) Álex Rins | (Spain) Álex Rins | (Spain) Derbi |
| 2 | 9 May | (Spain) Albacete 1 | (Spain) Maverick Viñales | (Portugal) Miguel Oliveira | (Spain) Maverick Viñales | (Italy) Aprilia |
| 3 | 13 June | (Spain) Jerez 1 | (Spain) Maverick Viñales | (Portugal) Miguel Oliveira | (Portugal) Miguel Oliveira | (Italy) Aprilia |
| 4 | 11 July | (Spain) Aragón | (Spain) Álex Rins | (Spain) Maverick Viñales | (Portugal) Miguel Oliveira | (Italy) Aprilia |
| 5 | 12 September | (Spain) Albacete 2 | (Spain) Maverick Viñales | (Spain) Maverick Viñales | (Spain) Maverick Viñales | (Italy) Aprilia |
| 6 | 14 November | (Spain) Valencia | (Portugal) Miguel Oliveira | (Portugal) Miguel Oliveira | (Portugal) Miguel Oliveira | (Italy) Aprilia |
| 7 | 21 November | (Spain) Jerez 2 | (Portugal) Miguel Oliveira | (Portugal) Miguel Oliveira | (Portugal) Miguel Oliveira | (Italy) Aprilia |

== Entry list ==
| Team | Constructor | No. | Rider | Rounds |
|---|---|---|---|---|
| (Russia) ADM Racing | Aprilia | 38 | (Russia) Ingvar Groza | 1, 4 |
| (Russia) ADM Racing | Aprilia | 39 | (Russia) Allan Groza | 1, 4 |
| (Spain) Alarcos Racing Team | Aprilia | 33 | (Spain) Antonio Alarcos | 1–5 |
| (United Kingdom) BRP Racing | Aprilia | 10 | (Australia) Corey Snowsill | 6–7 |
| (United Kingdom) BRP Racing | Aprilia | 14 | (Australia) Rhys Moller | 1–4 |
| (United Kingdom) BRP Racing | Aprilia | 70 | (Australia) Aaron Corish | 1, 3 |
| (United Kingdom) BRP Racing | Aprilia | 70 | (Australia) Matthew Davies | 4, 6–7 |
| (United Kingdom) BRP Racing | Aprilia | 94 | (Australia) Joel Taylor | 1–5 |
| (United Kingdom) BRP Racing | Aprilia | 94 | (Australia) Levi Day | 7 |
| (Spain) Catalunya Racing Team | Aprilia | 17 | (Spain) Eduard López | 1–4 |
| (Spain) Catalunya Racing Team | Aprilia | 28 | (Spain) Josep Rodríguez | 1–2 |
| (Spain) Catalunya Racing Team | Aprilia | 47 | (Australia) Giuseppe Scarcella | All |
| (Spain) Catalunya Racing Team | Aprilia | 55 | (Spain) Isaac Viñales | 1–4 |
| (Spain) Curvacero I.P.I. | Aprilia | 22 | (Spain) Pau Tortosa | 1–4 |
| (Italy) Faenza Racing | Aprilia | 71 | (Italy) Mattia Tarozzi | 2–3, 5–7 |
| (Italy) Grillini Bridgestone PBR Team | Aprilia | 32 | (Italy) Nicolas Stizza | 2–4 |
| (Italy) Grillini Bridgestone PBR Team | Aprilia | 52 | (Japan) Toshimitsu Gondo | 2–7 |
| (Italy) Grillini Bridgestone PBR Team | Aprilia | 88 | (Italy) Massimo Parziani | 2–7 |
| (Spain) Hernandez Racing 43 | Aprilia | 93 | (France) Robin Barbosa | 1–6 |
| (Spain) Hune Racing Team | Aprilia | 25 | (Spain) Maverick Viñales | All |
| (Spain) Hune Racing Team | Aprilia | 28 | (Spain) Josep Rodríguez | 3–7 |
| (Spain) Hune Racing Team | Aprilia | 31 | (Spain) Iván Maestro | 1–2 |
| (Slovakia) JJ Racing Team Mototechnic | Aprilia | 91 | (Slovakia) Jakub Jantulík | 1 |
| (Italy) Junior GP Dream FMI | Aprilia | 19 | (Italy) Alessandro Tonucci | 2 |
| (Italy) Junior GP Dream FMI | Aprilia | 48 | (Italy) Giovanni Bonati | 2 |
| (Italy) Junior GP Dream FMI | Aprilia | 68 | (Italy) Armando Pontone | 2 |
| (Italy) Junior GP Dream FMI | Aprilia | 99 | (Italy) Luigi Morciano | 2 |
| (Spain) Mallorca New Limit | Aprilia | 24 | (Spain) Miguel Poyatos | All |
| (Italy) Matteoni Racing Team | Aprilia | 12 | (Italy) Nazzareno Lumina | 3 |
| (Italy) Matteoni Racing Team | Aprilia | 53 | (Italy) Francesco Mauriello | 2–5 |
| (Spain) MIR Racing | Aprilia | 11 | (Spain) Jorge Navarro | 1, 3–7 |
| (Spain) MIR Racing | Aprilia | 15 | (Spain) Rubén González | 5 |
| (Spain) MIR Racing | Aprilia | 54 | (Italy) Andrea Migno | 6 |
| (Spain) MIR Racing | Aprilia | 57 | (Brazil) Eric Granado | 3 |
| (San Marino) PMS Team WTR Junior | Aprilia | 45 | (France) Jules Danilo | 6 |
| (San Marino) PMS Team WTR Junior | Aprilia | 72 | (Italy) Federico Fazzina | 1–3 |
| (San Marino) PMS Team WTR Junior | Aprilia | 89 | (France) Alan Techer | 1, 5–7 |
| (Italy) Racing Team Gabrielli | Aprilia | 59 | (Italy) Niccolò Antonelli | 6–7 |
| (Italy) Racing Team Gabrielli | Aprilia | 87 | (Italy) Paolo Giacomini | 6–7 |
| (Spain) Right Guard Racing Team | Aprilia | 56 | (Hungary) Peter Sebestyén | 2–5 |
| RZT Racing | Aprilia | 30 | (Germany) Luca Amato | 6–7 |
| (Spain) Team Andalucía Cajasol | Aprilia | 44 | (Portugal) Miguel Oliveira | All |
| (Italy) Team Ellegi Racing | Aprilia | 46 | (Italy) Romano Fenati | 6 |
| (Italy) Team Ellegi Racing | Aprilia | 65 | (Czech Republic) Miroslav Popov | 6 |
| (Italy) Team Ellegi Racing | Aprilia | 72 | (Italy) Federico Fazzina | 6–7 |
| (Spain) Team Quinto Almoradi | Aprilia | 41 | (Spain) Aitor Cremades | All |
| (Spain) Tey Racing | Aprilia | 16 | (Spain) Pedro Rodriguez | All |
| (Spain) Tey Racing | Aprilia | 17 | (Italy) Manuel Tatasciore | 6–7 |
| (Spain) Tey Racing | Aprilia | 26 | (Spain) Antonio Exposito | 5 |
| (Spain) XE–Pepetravel Racing Team | Aprilia | 99 | (Spain) Borja Maestro | 5 |
| (Spain) XE–Pepetravel Racing Team | Aprilia | 99 | (Spain) Sergio Mora | 3 |
| (Spain) Team Monlau Competicion | Derbi | 23 | (Spain) Álex Márquez | 2–7 |
| (Spain) Team Monlau Competicion | Derbi | 42 | (Spain) Álex Rins | All |
| (Spain) Team Monlau Competicion | Derbi | 74 | (Finland) Niklas Ajo | All |
| (Japan) 7C | Honda | 29 | (Japan) Hyuga Watanabe | 6–7 |
| (United Kingdom) ARC | Honda | 20 | (South Africa) Mathew Scholtz | 1–3 |
| (United Kingdom) ARC | Honda | 30 | (Austria) Deni Cudic | 3 |
| (United Kingdom) ARC | Honda | 50 | (United Kingdom) Danny Kent | 5–7 |
| (Spain) C.D. Lebrija Racing | Honda | 67 | (Spain) Cristobal Tejero | 3, 7 |
| (Spain) Ducati Barcelona SRT | Honda | 69 | (Spain) Javier Martinez | 1–3, 5–7 |
| Equipe de France Vitesse Espoir | Honda | 60 | (France) Grégory Di Carlo | 1, 4–5 |
| Equipe de France Vitesse Espoir | Honda | 60 | (France) Kevin Szalai | 6–7 |
| Equipe de France Vitesse Espoir | Honda | 90 | (France) Kevin Szalai | 4 |
| Equipe de France Vitesse Espoir | Honda | 90 | (France) Morgan Berchet | 1, 5–6 |
| Equipe de France Vitesse Espoir | Honda | 92 | (France) Mathieu Marchal | 7 |
| (Spain) Fusta Racing | Honda | 18 | (Spain) Adrian Miñana | 1–3, 6 |
| (Germany) Freudenberg Racing Team | Honda | 83 | (Germany) Luca Grünwald | 6–7 |
| (Australia) JPM Racing | Honda | 40 | (Australia) Joshua McGrath | 5–7 |
| (Australia) JPM Racing | Honda | 43 | (Australia) Jack Miller | 1–5 |
| (Australia) JPM Racing | Honda | 82 | (Australia) Jordan Zamora | 6–7 |
| (United Kingdom) KRP | Honda | 27 | (United Kingdom) John McPhee | 2–4, 6–7 |
| (United Kingdom) KRP | Honda | 35 | (United Kingdom) Taylor Mackenzie | 3, 6–7 |
| (United Kingdom) KRP | Honda | 49 | (United Kingdom) Samuel Hornsey | 4, 6–7 |
| (United Kingdom) KRP | Honda | 80 | (Spain) Dakota Mamola | 2–4 |
| (United Kingdom) KRP | Honda | 81 | (United Kingdom) Fraser Rogers | 2, 6–7 |
| (United Kingdom) KRP | Honda | 98 | (United Kingdom) Wayne Ryan | 2 |
| (Spain) Larresport | Honda | 34 | (Spain) Daniel Ruiz | 5–7 |
| (Spain) Larresport | Honda | 34 | (Spain) Edgar García | 1, 3–4 |
| (Spain) Molina Castillejo | Honda | 29 | (Spain) Moisés Sierra | 5 |
| (Spain) PCO Racing | Honda | 21 | (Spain) Javier Marimon | 1–2 |
| (Spain) Racing Mancelos | Honda | 62 | (Spain) Helde Fernandes | 7 |
| (Spain) Racing Nery Monteiro | Honda | 61 | (Portugal) André Pires | 7 |
| (Netherlands) Racing Team Van Lleuwen | Honda | 75 | (Netherlands) Thomas van Leeuwen | 6–7 |
| RZT Racing | Honda | 43 | (Australia) Jack Miller | 6 |
| (Spain) SAG Castrol | Honda | 36 | (Spain) Joan Perelló | All |
| (Spain) SAG Castrol | Honda | 37 | (Spain) Johnny Rosell | All |
| (Spain) SAG Castrol | Honda | 57 | (Brazil) Eric Granado | 4–7 |
| (Japan) Team Nobby | Honda | 58 | (Japan) Daijiro Hiura | 7 |
| (Japan) Team Nobby | Honda | 58 | (Japan) Takehiro Yamamoto | 6 |
| (Spain) Tey Racing | Honda | 13 | (Spain) Montserrat Costa | 1–2, 5–6 |
| (Italy) Battle Factory; Rumi 125GP Team | KTM | 76 | (Japan) Hiroki Ono | 1–2, 6–7 |
| (France) French Bike Academy | KTM | 51 | (France) Pierre Ginieys | 1–2 |
| (France) French Bike Academy | KTM | 77 | (France) Corentin Juilliet | 1–2, 4 |
| (Germany) Freudenberg Racing Team | KTM | 8 | (Austria) Deni Cudic | 6 |
| (Germany) Freudenberg Racing Team | KTM | 9 | (Germany) Toni Finsterbusch | 7 |
| (Sweden) Kristiansson Racing Team | KTM | 78 | (Sweden) Alexander Kristiansson | 7 |
| (Germany) Team HP–Moto | KTM | 95 | (Switzerland) Damien Raemy | 6 |
| (Germany) Team HP–Moto | KTM | 97 | (Germany) Philipp Öttl | 6–7 |
| (United Kingdom) TMR | KTM | 64 | (United Kingdom) James Flitcroft | 6 |

== Championship standings ==
| Pos. | Rider | Bike | CAT (Spain) | ALB 1 (Spain) | JER 1 (Spain) | ARA (Spain) | ALB 2 (Spain) | VAL (Spain) | JER 2 (Spain) | Pts |
|---|---|---|---|---|---|---|---|---|---|---|
| 1 | (Spain) Maverick Viñales | Aprilia | 3^{P} | 1^{P} | 3^{P} | 2^{F} | 1^{PF} | 2 | 2 | 142 |
| 2 | (Portugal) Miguel Oliveira | Aprilia | 2 | 2^{F} | 1^{F} | 1 | Ret | 1^{PF} | 1^{PF} | 140 |
| 3 | (Spain) Álex Rins | Derbi | 1^{F} | 6 | 2 | 3^{P} | 2 | 3 | 4 | 120 |
| 4 | (Italy) Mattia Tarozzi | Aprilia | | 9 | 6 | | 3 | 5 | 5 | 55 |
| 5 | (Finland) Niklas Ajo | Derbi | 5 | 7 | 5 | Ret | Ret | Ret | 3 | 47 |
| 6 | (Spain) Isaac Viñales | Aprilia | Ret | 4 | 4 | 4 | | | | 39 |
| 7 | (Spain) Joan Perelló | Honda | 10 | 17 | 7 | 11 | 5 | 18 | 13 | 34 |
| 8 | (Spain) Eduard López | Aprilia | 8 | 8 | 9 | 6 | | | | 33 |
| 9 | (Spain) Jorge Navarro | Aprilia | DNS | | 17 | Ret | 4 | 6 | 8 | 31 |
| 10 | (Spain) Pau Tortosa | Aprilia | Ret | 5 | 13 | 5 | | | | 25 |
| 11 | (Spain) Álex Márquez | Derbi | | 11 | Ret | 7 | 6 | Ret | Ret | 24 |
| 12 | (Spain) Johnny Rosell | Honda | 4 | 16 | DNS | 13 | Ret | 19 | 11 | 21 |
| 13 | (Spain) Daniel Ruiz | Honda | | | | | 8 | 9 | 10 | 21 |
| 14 | (Spain) Josep Rodríguez | Aprilia | 19 | 26 | 19 | 12 | 20 | 10 | 7 | 19 |
| 15 | (South Africa) Mathew Scholtz | Honda | 7 | 12 | 11 | | | | | 18 |
| 16 | (Italy) Alessandro Tonucci | Aprilia | | 3 | | | | | | 16 |
| 17 | (Italy) Niccolò Antonelli | Aprilia | | | | | | 8 | 9 | 15 |
| 18 | (Japan) Toshimitsu Gondo | Aprilia | | 20 | 8 | Ret | 9 | WD | 20 | 15 |
| 19 | (Italy) Massimo Parziani | Aprilia | | 19 | 12 | 8 | 19 | 17 | 14 | 14 |
| 20 | (Germany) Luca Grünwald | Honda | | | | | | 4 | Ret | 13 |
| 21 | (Japan) Hiroki Ono | KTM | 6 | 14 | | | | Ret | Ret | 12 |
| 22 | (United Kingdom) Taylor Mackenzie | Honda | | | Ret | | | 15 | 6 | 11 |
| 23 | (Italy) Francesco Mauriello | Aprilia | | 21 | 18 | 9 | 12 | | | 11 |
| 24 | (France) Grégory Di Carlo | Honda | 11 | | | 23 | 10 | | | 11 |
| 25 | (France) Alan Techer | Aprilia | 9 | | | | 15 | 14 | Ret | 10 |
| 26 | (Italy) Manuel Tatasciore | Aprilia | | | | | | 7 | Ret | 9 |
| 27 | (United Kingdom) Danny Kent | Honda | | | | | 7 | Ret | Ret | 9 |
| 28 | (Germany) Philipp Öttl | KTM | | | | | | 11 | 12 | 9 |
| 29 | (Italy) Nicolas Stizza | Aprilia | | 15 | 20 | 10 | | | | 7 |
| 30 | (Australia) Jack Miller | Honda | 25 | 28 | 16 | 16 | 13 | 12 | | 7 |
| 31 | (Australia) Joel Taylor | Aprilia | 12 | Ret | 22 | 15 | 14 | | | 7 |
| 32 | (Spain) Pedro Rodriguez | Aprilia | 18 | 24 | 10 | 17 | 16 | 16 | 18 | 6 |
| 33 | (Spain) Iván Maestro | Aprilia | 16 | 10 | | | | | | 6 |
| 34 | (France) Robin Barbosa | Aprilia | Ret | 23 | 21 | 29 | 11 | Ret | | 5 |
| 35 | (Spain) Dakota Mamola | Honda | | Ret | 14 | 14 | | | | 4 |
| 36 | (Italy) Armando Pontone | Aprilia | | 13 | | | | | | 3 |
| 37 | (France) Morgan Berchet | Honda | 13 | | | | DNS | 25 | | 3 |
| 38 | (Germany) Luca Amato | Aprilia | | | | | | 13 | DNQ | 3 |
| 39 | (Australia) Aaron Corish | Aprilia | 14 | | 31 | | | | | 2 |
| 40 | (Sweden) Alexander Kristiansson | KTM | | | | | | | 15 | 1 |
| 41 | (Spain) Edgar García | Honda | DNS | | 15 | Ret | | | | 1 |
| 42 | (Spain) Aitor Cremades | Aprilia | 15 | 25 | 23 | 21 | 21 | DNQ | 23 | 1 |
| | (Japan) Hyuga Watanabe | Honda | | | | | | Ret | 16 | 0 |
| | (Slovakia) Jakub Jantulík | Aprilia | 17 | | | | | | | 0 |
| | (Hungary) Peter Sebestyén | Aprilia | | Ret | Ret | 18 | 17 | | | 0 |
| | (Italy) Paolo Giacomini | Aprilia | | | | | | 29 | 17 | 0 |
| | (Spain) Borja Maestro | Aprilia | | | | | 18 | | | 0 |
| | (Italy) Giovanni Bonati | Aprilia | | 18 | | | | | | 0 |
| | (Spain) Miguel Poyatos | Aprilia | 20 | 27 | 27 | 19 | 22 | 22 | Ret | 0 |
| | (Netherlands) Thomas van Leeuwen | Honda | | | | | | 28 | 19 | 0 |
| | (Brazil) Eric Granado | Aprilia | | | 32 | | | | | 0 |
| | (Brazil) Eric Granado | Honda | | | | 20 | 24 | 27 | Ret | 0 |
| | (United Kingdom) Fraser Rogers | Honda | | Ret | | | | 20 | Ret | 0 |
| | (Italy) Romano Fenati | Aprilia | | | | | | 21 | | 0 |
| | (Australia) Corey Snowsill | Aprilia | | | | | | 23 | 21 | 0 |
| | (Spain) Adrian Miñana | Honda | 21 | 30 | 29 | | | DNQ | | 0 |
| | (Spain) Antonio Alarcos | Aprilia | Ret | Ret | 28 | 22 | 23 | | | 0 |
| | (United Kingdom) John McPhee | Honda | | 22 | DNS | 24 | | Ret | Ret | 0 |
| | (France) Kevin Szalai | Honda | | | | 27 | | 26 | 22 | 0 |
| | (France) Pierre Ginieys | KTM | 22 | 29 | | | | | | 0 |
| | (Australia) Giuseppe Scarcella | Aprilia | 23 | DNQ | DNS | Ret | Ret | Ret | DNQ | 0 |
| | (Spain) Helde Fernandes | Honda | | | | | | | 24 | 0 |
| | (Switzerland) Damien Raemy | KTM | | | | | | 24 | | 0 |
| | (Spain) Sergio Mora | Aprilia | | | 24 | | | | | 0 |
| | (France) Corentin Juilliet | KTM | 24 | Ret | | 26 | | | | 0 |
| | (Portugal) André Pires | Honda | | | | | | | 25 | 0 |
| | (Italy) Nazzareno Lumina | Aprilia | | | 25 | | | | | 0 |
| | (United Kingdom) Samuel Hornsey | Honda | | | | 25 | | 30 | Ret | 0 |
| | (Australia) Joshua McGrath | Honda | | | | | 25 | DNQ | Ret | 0 |
| | (Spain) Antonio Exposito | Aprilia | | | | | 26 | | | 0 |
| | (Spain) Cristobal Tejero | Honda | | | 30 | | | | 26 | 0 |
| | (Austria) Deni Cudic | Honda | | | 26 | | | | | 0 |
| | (Austria) Deni Cudic | KTM | | | | | | Ret | | 0 |
| | (Spain) Javier Martinez | Aprilia | 26 | DNQ | DNQ | | DNQ | DNQ | DNQ | 0 |
| | (Russia) Ingvar Groza | Aprilia | 27 | | | 30 | | | | 0 |
| | (Russia) Allan Groza | Aprilia | Ret | | | 28 | | | | 0 |
| | (Italy) Federico Fazzina | Aprilia | Ret | 31 | DNS | | | Ret | Ret | 0 |
| | (Australia) Matthews Davies | Aprilia | | | | Ret | | Ret | Ret | 0 |
| | (Australia) Jordan Zamora | Honda | | | | | | DNQ | Ret | 0 |
| | (Japan) Daijiro Hiura | Honda | | | | | | | Ret | 0 |
| | (Australia) Levi Day | Aprilia | | | | | | | Ret | 0 |
| | (Germany) Toni Finsterbusch | KTM | | | | | | | Ret | 0 |
| | (Italy) Andrea Migno | Aprilia | | | | | | Ret | | 0 |
| | (Czech Republic) Miroslav Popov | Aprilia | | | | | | Ret | | 0 |
| | (Spain) Moisés Sierra | Honda | | | | | Ret | | | 0 |
| | (Spain) Rubén González | Aprilia | | | | | Ret | | | 0 |
| | (Australia) Rhys Moller | Aprilia | Ret | Ret | Ret | Ret | | | | 0 |
| | (Italy) Luigi Morciano | Aprilia | | Ret | | | | | | 0 |
| | (United Kingdom) Wayne Ryan | Honda | | Ret | | | | | | 0 |
| | (France) Jules Danilo | Aprilia | | | | | | DNS | | |
| | (Japan) Takehiro Yamamoto | Honda | | | | | | DNS | | |
| | (France) Mathieu Marchal | Honda | | | | | | | DNQ | |
| | (Spain) Montserrat Costa | Honda | DNQ | DNQ | | | DNQ | DNQ | | |
| | (United Kingdom) James Flitcroft | KTM | | | | | | DNQ | | |
| | (Spain) Javier Marimon | Honda | DNQ | DNQ | | | | | | |
| Pos. | Rider | Bike | CAT (Spain) | ALB 1 (Spain) | JER 1 (Spain) | ARA (Spain) | ALB 2 (Spain) | VAL (Spain) | JER 2 (Spain) | Pts |

| Colour | Result |
|---|---|
| Gold | Winner |
| Silver | Second place |
| Bronze | Third place |
| Green | Points classification |
| Blue | Non-points classification |
| Blue | Non-classified finish (NC) |
| Purple | Retired, not classified (Ret) |
| Red | Did not qualify (DNQ) |
| Red | Did not pre-qualify (DNPQ) |
| Black | Disqualified (DSQ) |
| White | Did not start (DNS) |
| White | Withdrew (WD) |
| White | Race cancelled (C) |
| Blank | Did not practice (DNP) |
| Blank | Did not arrive (DNA) |
| Blank | Excluded (EX) |

P – Pole position
F – Fastest lap
