= 2009 CEV 125cc season =

Junior Motorcycle World Championship

2009 FIM JuniorGP World Championship
Previous:	2008	Next:	2010

The 2009 CEV 125cc season is the twelfth season of the CEV 125cc season. The season was held over 7 races at 7 meetings, beginning on 19 April at Circuito de Albacete and finished on 22 November at Circuit Ricardo Tormo.

Alberto Moncayo won the title after beating closest rival Maverick Viñales by 4 points.

== Calendar ==
2009 Calendar
Round	Date	Circuit	Pole position	Fastest lap	Race winner	Winning constructor
1	19 April	(Spain) Albacete 1	(United States) P. J. Jacobsen	(Spain) Luis Salom	(Spain) Isaac Viñales	(Italy) Aprilia
2	7 June	(Spain) Jerez 1	(Portugal) Miguel Oliveira	(Spain) Maverick Viñales	(Spain) Maverick Viñales	(Italy) Aprilia
3	12 July	(Spain) Valencia 1	(Spain) Maverick Viñales	(Spain) Maverick Viñales	(Spain) Alberto Moncayo	(Italy) Aprilia
4	27 September	(Spain) Albacete 2	(Spain) Alberto Moncayo	(Spain) Alberto Moncayo	(Spain) Alberto Moncayo	(Italy) Aprilia
5	11 October	(Spain) Catalunya	(Spain) Alberto Moncayo	(Portugal) Miguel Oliveira	(Spain) Alberto Moncayo	(Italy) Aprilia
6	15 November	(Spain) Jerez 2	(France) Johann Zarco	(Japan) Hiroki Ono	(France) Johann Zarco	(Italy) Aprilia
7	22 November	(Spain) Valencia 2	(France) Johann Zarco	(Germany) Jonas Folger	(Germany) Jonas Folger	(Italy) Aprilia

== Entry list ==
Team	Constructor	No.	Rider	Rounds
(Germany) ADAC Team Nordbayern	Aprilia	75	(Germany) Tobias Siegert	1–2
(Spain) Aguila Racing Team	Aprilia	69	(Spain) Miguel Garcia	2–4, 6–7
(Spain) Alarcos Racing	Aprilia	33	(Spain) Antonio Alarcos	6–7
(Spain) Andalucia Aprilia	Aprilia	4	(Spain) Alberto Moncayo	All
(Spain) Andalucia Aprilia	Aprilia	54	(Spain) Antonio Rodas	All
(Spain) Team Aspar CEV–Curvacero	Aprilia	23	(Spain) Isaac Viñales	All
(Spain) Team Aspar CEV–Curvacero	Aprilia	26	(Spain) Adrián Martín	All
(Spain) Team Aspar CEV–Curvacero	Aprilia	74	(Spain) Pau Tortosa	7
(Spain) Team Aspar CEV–Curvacero	Aprilia	83	(Italy) Franco Morbidelli	7
(Spain) Team Aspar CEV–Curvacero	Aprilia	99	(United States) P. J. Jacobsen	All
(Spain) Blusens BQR	Aprilia	25	(Spain) Maverick Viñales	All
(Spain) Blusens BQR	Aprilia	37	(Spain) Johnny Rosell	All
(Spain) Blusens BQR	Aprilia	44	(Portugal) Miguel Oliveira	All
(Netherlands) DeGraaf Grand Prix Junior Team	Aprilia	65	(Australia) Blake Leigh-Smith	2, 4–7
(Netherlands) DeGraaf Grand Prix Junior Team	Aprilia	71	(United Kingdom) Max Wadsworth	All
(Italy) Ellegi Racing	Aprilia	95	(Czech Republic) Miroslav Popov	4
(Italy) Grillini Racing Team	Aprilia	32	(Italy) Nicolas Stizza	6–7
(Spain) Hune Racing Team–RZT Racing	Aprilia	20	(South Africa) Mathew Scholtz	6–7
(Spain) Hune Racing Team–RZT Racing	Aprilia	27	(Spain) Borja Maestro	1–4
(Spain) Hune Racing Team–RZT Racing	Aprilia	46	(Spain) Iván Maestro	All
(Spain) Hune Racing Team–RZT Racing	Aprilia	87	(France) Quentin Jacquet	1, 3–4
(Italy) Junior GP Racing Dream	Aprilia	18	(Italy) Gennaro Sabatino	4
(Italy) Junior GP Racing Dream	Aprilia	29	(Italy) Alessandro Tonucci	4
(Italy) Junior GP Racing Dream	Aprilia	70	(Italy) Armando Pontone	4
(Italy) Junior GP Racing Dream	Aprilia	98	(Italy) Luigi Morciano	4
(Italy) NFR Racing	Aprilia	49	(Italy) Gennaro Romano	6–7
(Italy) Racing Team Gabrielli	Aprilia	12	(Italy) Matteo Gabrielli	4, 6–7
(Italy) Racing Team Gabrielli	Aprilia	64	(Italy) Tommaso Gabrielli	4, 6–7
(Italy) Racing Team Gabrielli	Aprilia	88	(Italy) Massimo Parziani	4, 6–7
(Spain) Team Hernandez	Aprilia	33	(Spain) Antonio Alarcos	1–2
(Spain) Team Hernandez	Aprilia	76	(Spain) Luis Miguel Mora	All
(Australia) Team KLS	Aprilia	84	(Australia) Andrew Lawson	1–3
(Australia) Team KLS	Aprilia	94	(Australia) Joel Taylor	4–7
(France) Team Provence Moto Sport	Aprilia	80	(France) Clément Dunikowski	All
(Spain) Team Quinto	Aprilia	41	(Spain) Aitor Cremades	All
(Germany) Team Sachsenring	Aprilia	7	(Italy) Mattia Tarozzi	6–7
(Germany) Team Sachsenring	Aprilia	52	(Germany) Eric Hübsch	7
(Spain) Team TCR Competicion	Aprilia	17	(Spain) Eduard López	All
(Spain) Team TCR Competicion	Aprilia	62	(Australia) Giuseppe Scarcella	6–7
(Spain) Tey Racing	Aprilia	5	(Germany) Jonas Folger	7
(Spain) Tey Racing	Aprilia	9	(Italy) Lorenzo Savadori	7
(Spain) Tey Racing	Aprilia	13	(Spain) Antonio Alarte	All
(Spain) Tey Racing	Aprilia	14	(Malaysia) Zulfahmi Khairuddin	7
(Spain) Tey Racing	Aprilia	22	(Hungary) Alen Győrfi	1–4
(Spain) Tey Racing	Aprilia	56	(Hungary) Peter Sebestyén	All
(France) TMMR	Aprilia	87	(France) Patricia Mourin	5
WTR San Marino Team	Aprilia	6	(France) Johann Zarco	6–7
(Finland) Ajo Motorsport	Derbi	11	(Finland) Niklas Ajo	6–7
(Germany) ADAC Wurttemberg	Honda	78	(Germany) Felix Forstenhausler	6–7
(Russia) ADM Racing	Honda	30	(Russia) Allan Groza	5
(Spain) Albatros Racing Team	Honda	92	(Switzerland) Patrick Meile	5
(Spain) Chivi Bikes Racing Team	Honda	11	(Spain) Daniel Puerto	3
(Spain) Clima Cartagena	Honda	59	(Spain) Javier Segado	3
(Netherlands) Dutch Racing Team	Honda	89	(Netherlands) Michael van der Mark	6–7
Equipe de France Vitesse Espoir	Honda	60	(France) Grégory Di Carlo	3–7
Equipe de France Vitesse Espoir	Honda	90	(France) Alan Techer	4–5
Equipe de France Vitesse Espoir	Honda	90	(France) Kevin Szalai	3, 6–7
(Spain) Hobby 911 Team	Honda	55	(Colombia) Andrés Flor	2–7
(Germany) LHF–Project Racing Team	Honda	85	(Germany) Marvin Fritz	6–7
(Spain) Mallorca New Limit	Honda	43	(Spain) Miguel Poyatos	7
(Sweden) Motorcycle Competicion	Honda	95	(Sweden) Eric Lindroth	6–7
(Spain) MYMoto Racing	Honda	12	(Spain) Franc Serra	5
(Spain) Pitisil Racing	Honda	47	(Spain) Oscar Calvo	3, 5
(Spain) PCO Racing	Honda	21	(Spain) Javier Marimon	3–4, 7
(Spain) PCO Racing	Honda	58	(Spain) Javier Cholbi	3
(Switzerland) Robyn Racing Team	Honda	70	(Switzerland) Robin Mulhauser	7
(Spain) SAG–Castrol	Honda	31	(Spain) Jordi Dalmau	All
(Spain) SAG–Castrol	Honda	35	(Spain) Javier Martinez	7
(Spain) SAG–Castrol	Honda	36	(Spain) Joan Perelló	All
(Spain) SAG–Castrol	Honda	39	(Spain) Luis Salom	1–2
(Spain) SAG–Castrol	Honda	68	(Australia) Glenn Scott	All
(Spain) SAG–Castrol	Honda	79	(Spain) Daniel Ruiz	4
(United Kingdom) Team ARC	Honda	8	(Japan) Daijiro Hiura	6–7
(France) Team AX'CLR	Honda	14	(France) Pierre Ginieys	1–2, 5
(United Kingdom) Team KRP Bradley Smith Racing	Honda	38	(United States) Dakota Mamola	6–7
(United Kingdom) Team KRP Bradley Smith Racing	Honda	77	(United Kingdom) Taylor Mackenzie	6–7
(Spain) Team Larresport	Honda	20	(Spain) Fernando Rodríguez	4–5
(Spain) Team Larresport	Honda	94	(Spain) Fernando Rodríguez	1–3
(Spain) Team Larresport	Honda	51	(Spain) Álvaro Sánchez	1
(Spain) Tomasi Racing Team	Honda	19	(Spain) Alberto Tomasi	1–4, 6
(Spain) Vidal Racing Competicion	Honda	15	(Spain) Christian Vidal	1–4
(France) Villier Team Competicion	Honda	16	(France) Richard De Tournay	1–2, 4, 6
(France) Villier Team Competicion	Honda	28	(France) Steven Le Coquen	All
(France) Villier Team Competicion	Honda	93	(France) Robin Barbosa	3, 5–6
(Italy) B&B Battle Factory	KTM	10	(Japan) Hiroki Ono	6–7
(Germany) Freudenberg Racing Team	KTM	57	(Germany) Toni Finsterbusch	7
(Spain) Monlau Competicion	KTM	24	(Spain) Josep Rodríguez	All
(Spain) Monlau Competicion	KTM	34	(Spain) Edgar García	All
(France) Team AX'CLR	KTM	96	(France) Louis Rossi	All
(Spain) Bancaja MIR	MIR Racing	74	(Spain) Pedro Rodriguez	3, 7
(Spain) Bancaja MIR	MIR Racing	75	(Spain) Francisco García	5
(Spain) Bancaja MIR	MIR Racing	84	(Spain) Julián Miralles	4–5
(Italy) Team Rumi	Rumi	61	(Italy) Nazzareno Lumina	7
(Germany) Freudenberg Racing Team	Seel	32	(Germany) Daniel Kartheininger	5
(Germany) Freudenberg Racing Team	Seel	42	(Germany) Joël Bigler	5
(Germany) Freudenberg Racing Team	Seel	45	(Germany) Luca Grünwald	7
(Germany) Freudenberg Racing Team	Seel	57	(Germany) Toni Finsterbusch	5

== Championship standings ==
Pos.	Rider	Bike	ALB 1 (Spain)	JER 1 (Spain)	VAL1 (Spain)	ALB 2 (Spain)	CAT (Spain)	JER 2 (Spain)	VAL2 (Spain)	Pts
1	(Spain) Alberto Moncayo	Aprilia	6	3	1	1^{P F}	1^{P}	Ret	10	107
2	(Spain) Maverick Viñales	Aprilia	Ret	1^{F}	2^{P F}	3	3	4	4	103
3	(Portugal) Miguel Oliveira	Aprilia	Ret	DSQ^{P}	4	2	2^{F}	2	Ret	73
4	(Spain) Isaac Viñales	Aprilia	1	4	Ret	12	6	13	8	63
5	(France) Louis Rossi	KTM	2	12	3	Ret	8	10	20	54
6	(United States) P. J. Jacobsen	Aprilia	5^{P}	Ret	6	8	7	Ret	3	54
7	(Spain) Iván Maestro	Aprilia	8	2	9	Ret	9	5	Ret	53
8	(France) Johann Zarco	Aprilia						1^{P}	2^{P}	45
9	(France) Clément Dunikowski	Aprilia	3	Ret	11	Ret	5	Ret	6	42
10	(Spain) Joan Perelló	Honda	10	24	14	9	4	8	11	41
11	(Spain) Adrián Martín	Aprilia	14	DSQ	5	7	Ret	11	9	34
12	(Hungary) Peter Sebestyén	Aprilia	Ret	5	Ret	18	14	9	5	31
13	(Spain) Johnny Rosell	Aprilia	9	7	8	Ret	13	Ret	13	30
14	(Spain) Eduard López	Aprilia	19	6	15	6	10	Ret	22	27
15	(Germany) Jonas Folger	Aprilia							1^{F}	25
16	(Japan) Hiroki Ono	KTM						3^{F}	7	25
17	(Australia) Glenn Scott	Honda	7	8	16	13	20	23	Ret	20
18	(Spain) Edgar García	KTM	15	10	7	27	Ret	19	27	16
19	(Italy) Luigi Morciano	Aprilia				4				13
20	(Spain) Luis Salom	Honda	4^{F}	Ret						13
21	(Netherlands) Michael van der Mark	Honda						7	12	13
22	(Spain) Jordi Dalmau	Honda	11	11	17	14	15	16	Ret	13
23	(Italy) Alessandro Tonucci	Aprilia				5				11
24	(Italy) Nicolas Stizza	Aprilia						6	30	10
25	(Spain) Borja Maestro	Aprilia	13	14	12	21				9
26	(France) Steven Le Coquen	Honda	Ret	9	Ret	15	Ret	20	Ret	8
27	(Italy) Armando Pontone	Aprilia				10				6
28	(France) Quentin Jacquet	Aprilia	Ret		10	16				6
29	(Spain) Antonio Rodas	Aprilia	Ret	15	19	11	Ret	21	DNQ	6
30	(Germany) Daniel Kartheininger	Seel					11			5
31	(Germany) Toni Finsterbusch	Seel					12			4
31	(Germany) Toni Finsterbusch	KTM							19	4
32	(United Kingdom) Taylor Mackenzie	Honda						12	26	4
33	(Australia) Andrew Lawson	Aprilia	12	Ret	Ret					4
34	(France) Grégory Di Carlo	Honda			13	26	17	22	DNQ	3
35	(Australia) Blake Leigh-Smith	Aprilia		13		19	DNS	17	24	3
36	(Japan) Daijiro Hiura	Honda						Ret	14	2
37	(United States) Dakota Mamola	Honda						14	DNQ	2
38	(Italy) Massimo Parziani	Aprilia				22		15	15	2
	(United Kingdom) Max Wadsworth	Aprilia	16	21	27	DNQ	25	27	DNQ	0
	(Spain) Aitor Cremades	Aprilia	Ret	28	26	24	16	DNQ	DNQ	0
	(Hungary) Alen Győrfi	Aprilia	Ret	16	Ret	25				0
	(South Africa) Mathew Scholtz	Aprilia						Ret	16	0
	(Spain) Pau Tortosa	Aprilia							17	0
	(Spain) Antonio Alarte	Aprilia	17	20	23	23	22	26	29	0
	(Italy) Tommaso Gabrielli	Aprilia				17		Ret	Ret	0
	(Spain) Antonio Alarcos	Aprilia	Ret	17				DNQ	DNQ	0
	(Spain) Álvaro Sánchez	Honda	18							0
	(Spain) Josep Rodríguez	KTM	Ret	18	18	Ret	23	18	Ret	0
	(Finland) Niklas Ajo	Derbi						Ret	18	0
	(France) Alan Techer	Honda				Ret	18			0
	(Spain) Luis Miguel Mora	Aprilia	20	19	Ret	Ret	DNQ	DNQ	DNQ	0
	(Spain) Julián Miralles	MIR Racing				Ret	19			0
	(Italy) Matteo Gabrielli	Aprilia				20		31	25	0
	(Spain) Javier Marimon	Honda			20	DNQ			DNQ	0
	(Switzerland) Patrick Meile	Honda					21			0
	(France) Kevin Szalai	Honda			21			24	28	0
	(Spain) Christian Vidal	Honda	21	25	Ret	DNQ				0
	(Italy) Mattia Tarozzi	Aprilia						Ret	21	0
	(Spain) Miguel Garcia	Aprilia		Ret	22	28		Ret	31	0
	(France) Pierre Ginieys	Honda	Ret	22			Ret			0
	(Germany) Eric Hübsch	Aprilia							23	0
	(France) Richard De Tournay	Honda	Ret	23		Ret		30		0
	(France) Robin Barbosa	Honda			25		24	28		0
	(Spain) Fernando Rodríguez	Honda	Ret	26	24	DNQ	Ret			0
	(Sweden) Eric Lindroth	Honda						25	Ret	0
	(Colombia) Andrés Flor	Honda		29	Ret	DNQ	26	DNQ	DNQ	0
	(Spain) Alberto Tomasi	Honda	Ret	27	28	DNQ		DNQ		0
	(Australia) Joel Taylor	Aprilia				DNQ	27	29	DNQ	0
	(Spain) Franc Serra	Honda					28			0
	(Spain) Oscar Calvo	Honda			29		Ret			0
	(Spain) Javier Cholbi	Honda			30					0
	(Spain) Javier Segado	Honda			31					0
	(Germany) Marvin Fritz	Honda						Ret	Ret	0
	(Spain) Pedro Rodriguez	MIR Racing			Ret				DNQ	0
	(Italy) Gennaro Romano	Aprilia						Ret	DNQ	0
	(Italy) Franco Morbidelli	Aprilia							Ret	0
	(Italy) Lorenzo Savadori	Aprilia							Ret	0
	(Germany) Luca Grünwald	Seel							Ret	0
	(Malaysia) Zulfahmi Khairuddin	Aprilia							Ret	0
	(Russia) Allan Groza	Honda					Ret			0
	(Spain) Francisco García	MIR Racing					Ret			0
	(Germany) Joël Bigler	Seel					Ret			0
	(Spain) Daniel Ruiz	Honda				Ret				0
	(Italy) Gennaro Sabatino	Aprilia				Ret				0
	(Czech Republic) Miroslav Popov	Aprilia				Ret				0
	(Germany) Tobias Siegert	Aprilia	Ret	DNS						0
	(Germany) Felix Forstenhausler	Honda						DNQ	DNQ	
	(Australia) Giuseppe Scarcella	Aprilia						DNQ	DNQ	
	(Spain) Javier Martinez	Honda							DNQ	
	(Spain) Miguel Poyatos	Honda							DNQ	
	(Italy) Nazzareno Lumina	Rumi							DNQ	
	(Switzerland) Robin Mulhauser	Honda							DNQ	
	(France) Patricia Mourin	Aprilia					DNQ			
	(Spain) Daniel Puerto	Honda			DNQ					
Pos.	Rider	Bike	ALB 1 (Spain)	JER 1 (Spain)	VAL1 (Spain)	ALB 2 (Spain)	CAT (Spain)	JER 2 (Spain)	VAL2 (Spain)	Pts

Colour	Result
Gold	Winner
Silver	Second place
Bronze	Third place
Green	Points classification
Blue	Non-points classification
Blue	Non-classified finish (NC)
Purple	Retired, not classified (Ret)
Red	Did not qualify (DNQ)
Red	Did not pre-qualify (DNPQ)
Black	Disqualified (DSQ)
White	Did not start (DNS)
White	Withdrew (WD)
White	Race cancelled (C)
Blank	Did not practice (DNP)
Blank	Did not arrive (DNA)
Blank	Excluded (EX)

P – Pole position
F – Fastest lap
