= Joel Taylor =

Joel Taylor may refer to:

- Joel Taylor (musician) (born 1959), American drummer
- Joel Taylor (motorcyclist) (born 1994), motorcycle racer from Australia
- Joel Taylor (footballer) (born 1996), English footballer
- Joel Taylor (storm chaser) (died 2018), driver and meteorologist on the TV series Storm Chasers
