= Tarozzi =

Tarozzi is an Italian surname. Notable people with the surname include:

- Andrea Tarozzi (born 1973), Italian footballer and manager
- Mattia Tarozzi (born 1991), Italian motorcycle racer
