= 2010 Grand Prix motorcycle racing season =

Sports season

2010 F.I.M. Grand Prix motorcycle racing season

Seasons
- ← 2009 2011 →

2010 World Champions

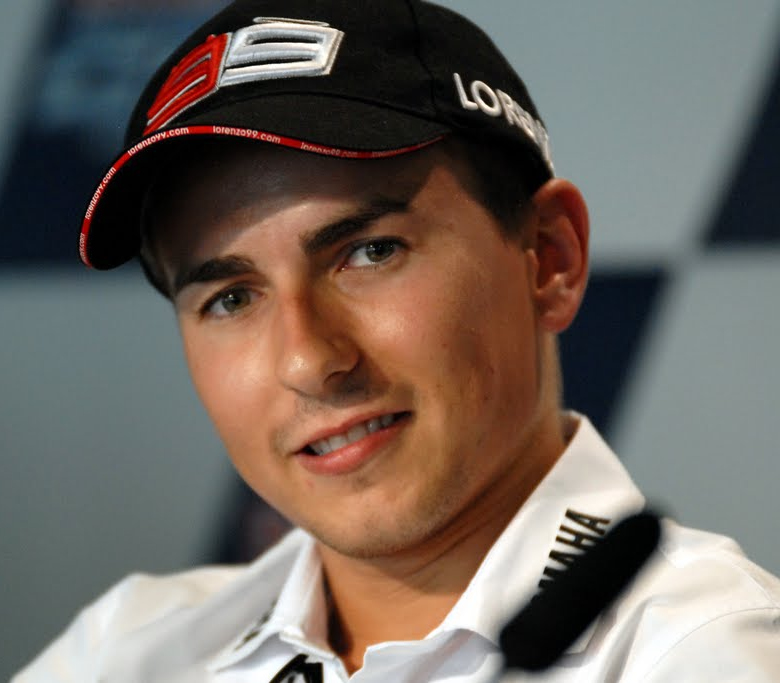
Jorge Lorenzo was the 2010 MotoGP World Riders' Champion.

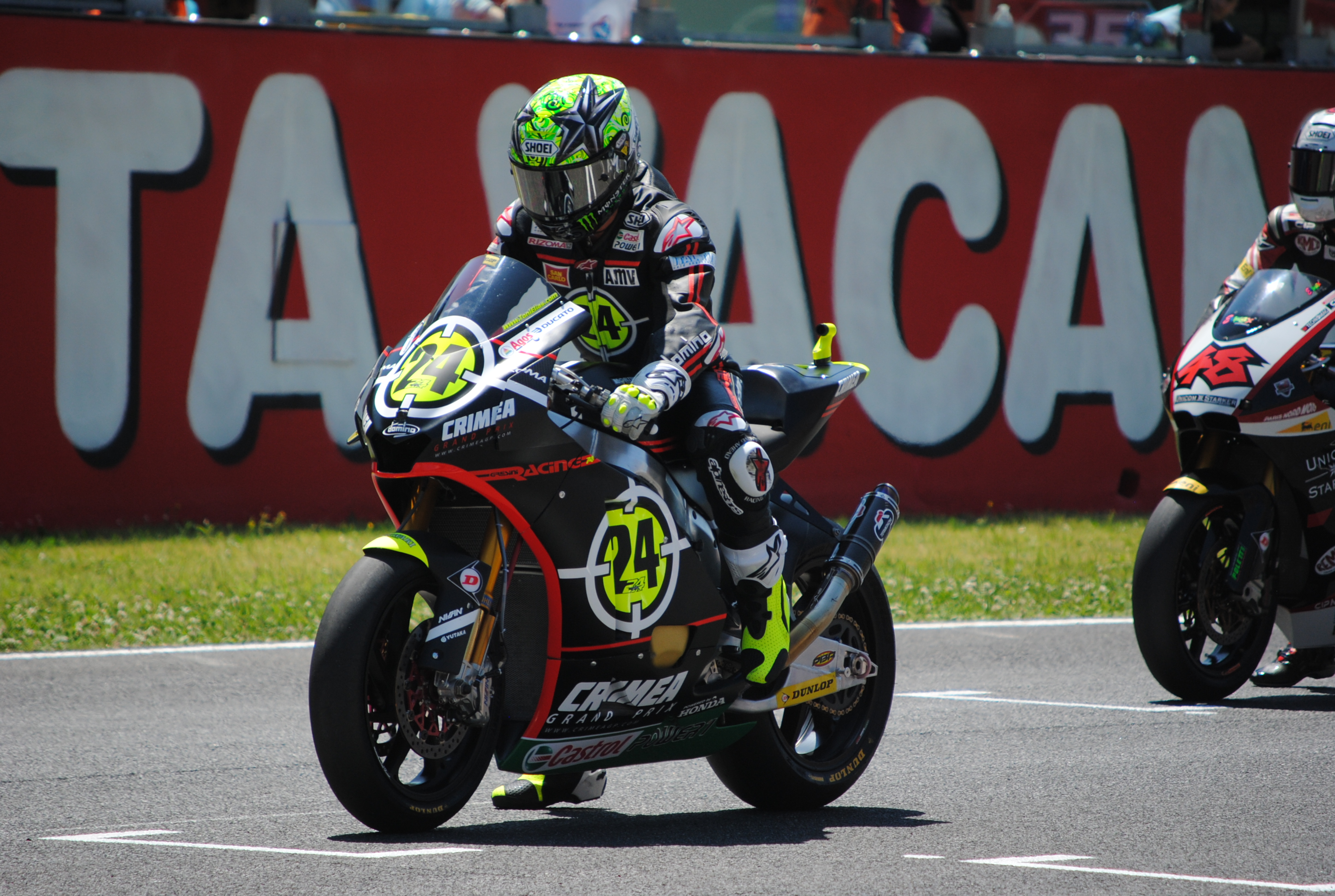
Toni Elías was the 2010 Moto2 World Riders' Champion.

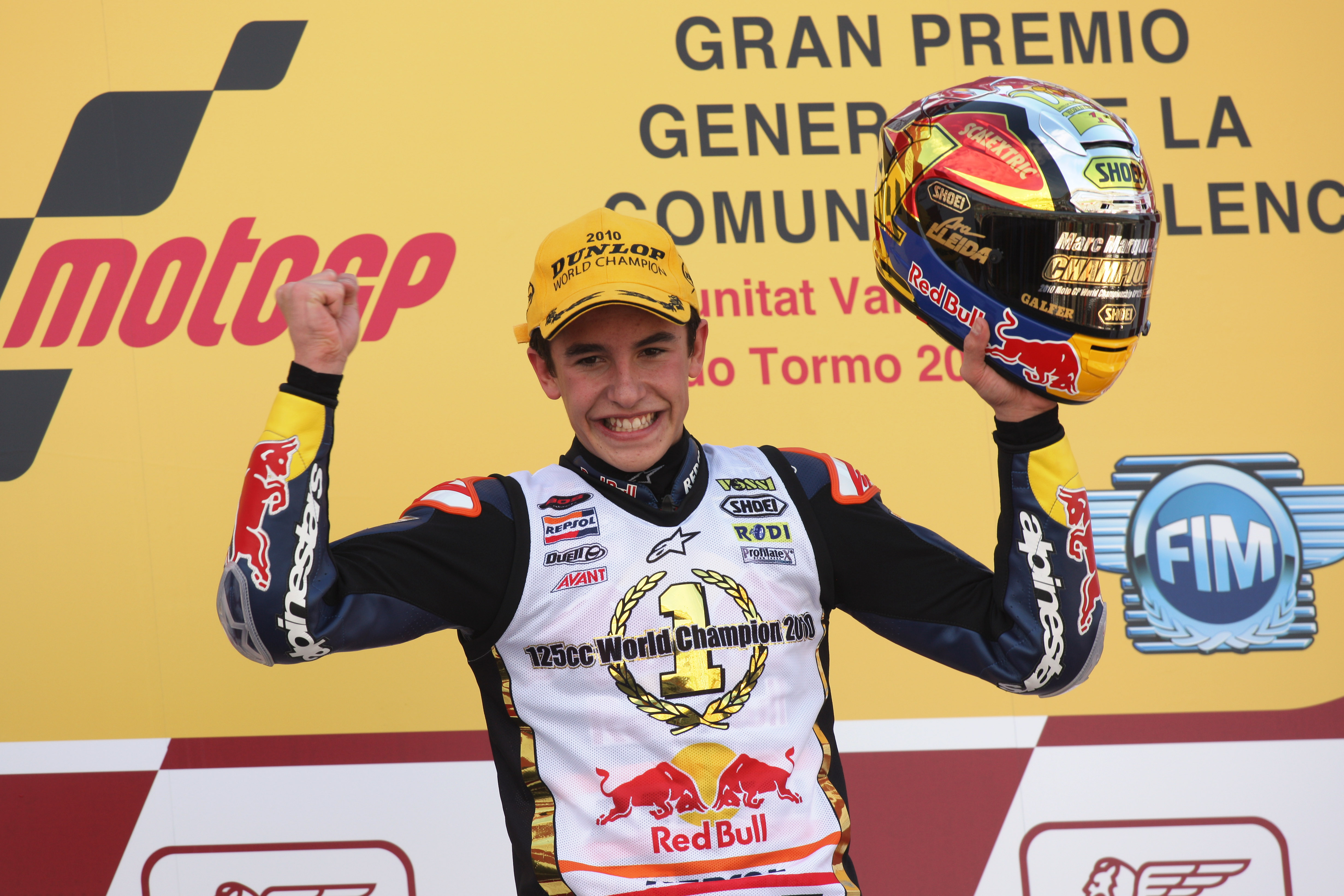
Marc Márquez was the 2010 125cc World Riders' Champion.

The 2010 Grand Prix motorcycle racing season was the 62nd F.I.M. Road Racing World Championship season. The season consisted out of 18 races for the MotoGP class and 17 for the 125cc and Moto2 classes, beginning with the Qatar motorcycle Grand Prix on 11 April 2010 and ending with the Valencian Community motorcycle Grand Prix on 7 November. It was the first season for the new Moto2 class.

== Preseason ==
=== Moto2 introduction ===
The Moto2 class replaced the 250cc class for 2010. The original intention was for Moto2 bikes to run alongside the existing 250cc machinery, however the entry list consisted of Moto2 machines only. The new class aimed to be economical, with measures such as limiting electronics (which will be supplied only by FIM sanctioned producers), the ban of carbon-ceramic brakes and the use of steel brakes only; however, there are no chassis limitations. All Moto2 bikes use a mandatory 600cc (36.6 cu in) Honda engine based on the Honda CBR600RR, which are prepared by Honda's European specialized tuner Ten Kate, and produces power of about 150 bhp. Control tires for the new series were provided by Dunlop only, despite early intentions of leaving tire specifications free.

== Season review ==
=== MotoGP class ===
Jorge Lorenzo was crowned MotoGP World Champion for the first time, after he finished third in the Malaysian Grand Prix on 10 October. Finishing on the podium in 16 of the 18 races – including nine victories – to be held during the season, Lorenzo amassed a record points total for the premier class, achieving a total of 383 points, ten more than the previous best score achieved by Valentino Rossi in 2008. Second in the championship was Dani Pedrosa, 138 points behind Lorenzo, recording four race victories over the course of the season. He and third-placed Rossi both missed at least three races due to injuries suffered during race weekends; Pedrosa suffered a fractured collarbone at Motegi, while Rossi suffered a broken leg at Mugello, resulting in the first missed races of his entire Grand Prix career. The only other rider to win races during the season was Casey Stoner, who finished fourth in the championship. Stoner won three races in the latter half of the season, winning the inaugural race in Aragón, as well as the races at Motegi and his home race at Phillip Island.

=== Moto2 class ===
Nine different riders won races in the secondary Moto2 championship, and former MotoGP rider Toni Elías claimed the inaugural championship title, with three events to spare as his seven victories had taken him out of reach of his rivals. Second place went to Julián Simón, who despite not winning a race, finished on the podium eight times. Third place in the championship went to Andrea Iannone, who achieved three victories but lost out on runner-up in the championship to Simón by just two points. The season was also tinged with tragedy as the inaugural race winner in the class, Shoya Tomizawa, died of injuries suffered in an accident at Misano; the first on-track fatality at Grand Prix level since Daijiro Kato was killed in the senior class at Suzuka in 2003. Other riders to win races were Jules Cluzel, Yuki Takahashi, Roberto Rolfo, Alex de Angelis, Stefan Bradl, and Karel Abraham.

=== 125cc class ===
Spanish riders once again dominated the 125cc championship, with a 26-race winning streak for Spanish riders only being broken by Bradley Smith at the final race of the season in Valencia. The top three championship placings went to Spanish riders as Marc Márquez won the championship ahead of Nicolás Terol and Pol Espargaró. With ten victories, Márquez became the second youngest World Champion ever at the age of 17 years, 263 days, with only Loris Capirossi's 1990 triumph coming at a younger age.

== 2010 Grand Prix season calendar ==
The following Grands Prix were scheduled to take place in 2010:

The provisional calendar was announced on 10 November 2009. In case a circuit was not able to hold a scheduled Grand Prix, a reserve race would take place on the same day at the MotorLand Aragón circuit. This was updated six days later, with a date change for the Czech round, moving one week forward. It was announced on 18 March 2010 that Aragón would be included on the calendar, at the expense of the Balatonring, due to the fact that construction work on the latter circuit could not be completed on time. On 19 April 2010, it was announced that the Japanese Grand Prix would be moved from 25 April to 3 October, due to the disruption to air travel after the second eruption of the Eyjafjallajökull volcano in Iceland.

Round	Date	Grand Prix	Circuit
1	11 April ‡	Commercialbank Grand Prix of Qatar	Losail International Circuit
2	2 May	(Spain) Gran Premio bwin de España	Circuito de Jerez
3	23 May	Monster Energy Grand Prix de France	Bugatti Circuit
4	6 June	(Italy) Gran Premio d'Italia TIM	Mugello Circuit
5	20 June	(United Kingdom) AirAsia British Grand Prix	Silverstone Circuit
6	26 June ††	(Netherlands) TIM TT Assen	TT Circuit Assen
7	4 July	(Catalonia) Gran Premi Aperol de Catalunya	Circuit de Catalunya
8	18 July	(Germany) eni Motorrad Grand Prix Deutschland	Sachsenring
9	25 July †	(United States) Red Bull U.S. Grand Prix	Mazda Raceway Laguna Seca
10	15 August	(Czech Republic) Cardion ab Grand Prix České republiky	Brno Circuit
11	29 August	Red Bull Indianapolis Grand Prix	Indianapolis Motor Speedway
12	5 September	Gran Premio Aperol di San Marino e Della Riviera di Rimini	Misano World Circuit
13	19 September	(Aragon) Gran Premio A-Style de Aragón	MotorLand Aragón
14	3 October	Grand Prix of Japan	Twin Ring Motegi
15	10 October	(Malaysia) Shell Advance Malaysian Motorcycle Grand Prix	Sepang International Circuit
16	17 October	(Australia) Iveco Australian Grand Prix	Phillip Island Grand Prix Circuit
17	31 October	bwin Grande Prémio de Portugal	Autódromo do Estoril
18	7 November	(Valencian Community) Gran Premio Generali de la Comunitat Valenciana	Circuit Ricardo Tormo

‡ = Night race
† = MotoGP class only
†† = Saturday race

=== Calendar changes ===
- The Japanese Grand Prix was moved back, from 26 April to 3 October, due to the second eruption of the Eyjafjallajökull volcano in Iceland.
- The British Grand Prix moved from Donington Park to the Silverstone Circuit, after a bid by the FIA and Bernie Ecclestone to host Formula 1 from the 2010 season onwards.
- Only the MotoGP class raced during the United States Grand Prix because of a Californian law on air pollution, preventing the 125cc and Moto2 classes from racing.
- The Aragon Grand Prix was added to the calendar as a replacement, after it was announced that construction of the Balatonring was not finished.
- The Portuguese Grand Prix was moved back, from 4 to 31 October.

== Regulation changes ==
The following changes are made to the regulation for the 2010 season:

=== Sporting regulations ===
- This season sees the introduction of a completely new class: the Moto2 class. The new bikes will race with 600cc four-stroke engines and will replace the 250cc class and its bikes, which existed until 2009.
- In the Moto2 class, a proposal has been filed in March 2009 for a "One Make Engine Regulation" where all manufacturers were to be consulted if they were interested. After there was interest, the FIM announced that there will be a single engine supplier for the class in April 2009, it being CBR600RR inline-four engines which were to be developed by Honda.
- In March 2009 a proposal was created to ban all Friday practice sessions as part of a cost-cutting measure, but after vocal opposition from top rider Rossi and further talks, those plans were scrapped in the same month.
- From this season onwards, riders are allowed to only use one bike for all the races.
- The minimum weight for a single bike will be two kg more than previously was allowed as compensation.
- The number of engines that can be used without penalty have now been set for the whole championship.
- It is now forbidden for Factory teams to recruit rookies in their teams, and have to start with a Satellite team in their first year instead. Suzuki are exempt from this rule, as they only run one Factory team and have no Satellite teams of their own.
- A new schedule for all events will be announced.
- The maximum number of people which are allowed to work on a bike will be a maximum of five.
- Using riders under contract to practice with MotoGP bikes is not allowed during the season as well as the breaks at any track included on the current year's calendar. A few exceptions were already in place (it is permitted if the practice is added to the event schedule, the practice happens during the day(s) immediately after the race at three circuits, at the circuit where the race has occurred and so on) but a few new ones have been introduced. The new exceptions are:
  - If the practice is added in the main schedule of the weekend
  - If the practice is during the day immediately after the Spanish Grand Prix at Jerez and the Czech Grand Prix at Brno, or during the two days immediately after the final Grand Prix of the year, which is in Valencia.
  - If the practice is allowed by the Race Direction.
- The same goes for the winter period. It is forbidden to use contracted riders to practice with MotoGP at any circuit. There were a few exceptions to this rule as well (it is permitted if there's a maximum of six days where Dorna/IRTA organise official tests at tracks which were added to the calendars of the previous or next year and if the activity has been specifically approved by the Race Direction) but these exceptions have been updated for this year as well. The exceptions apply to this rule if:
  - There's a maximum of six official test days which are arranged by Dorna and the IRTA at Grand Prix tracks which were included in calendars of the last or will be included in the calendar of next year. It is forbidden to test during the period of 1 December of one year and ends on 31 January of the next year, both dates being inclusive. An exception is made for rookie riders, who are allowed a singular three-day test during the November and December period.
  - The winter test schedule is approved by the Grand Prix Commission.
- In the 125cc and Moto2 class, wildcard riders are spared from these practice restrictions, which only apply to riders under contract in the MotoGP category. Before this decision, wildcard riders were not able to practice or race at any grand prix in the fourteen days before the race.
- Modifications have been made on the Medical Code which covers the minimum medical obligations for race weekends. The medical service consisting of equipment, vehicles and personnel has to be organised in an efficient way with enough people to guarantee that a rider who is hurt can be treated accordingly, with minimum delay and fast transfer to hospitals or other appropriately equipped medical centres to deal with more kinds of injuries or illnesses if this is needed.
- After the retainment of the Friday practice sessions, a new, third experimental Practice session has been introduced for the Aragón race. The aggregate time across all the three practice and qualifying sessions will remain the same as it has been in the previous format. The new session will be held on Friday morning next to the traditional Friday afternoon and Saturday morning sessions. After the success of this rule, it was extended to the Portuguese and Valencian Community races - the final two rounds of the season.
- To avoid extra mileage on the engine because of the extra practice session, the run time has been shortened from one hour to 45 minutes.
- Effective 1 May 2010, if a rider has been punished for an engine violation, he has to begin the race from the pits ten seconds, instead of twenty seconds, after the start of the race.

=== Technical regulations ===
- Brakes that are made out of carbon composite materials have to be one diameter and two types of mass. The maximum of the diameter will be 320 mm.
- The maximum pressure allowed for the injection of fuel has been set to ten Bar.
- The use of Metal Matrix Composite (MMC) and Fiber Matrix Material (FRM) is now forbidden.
- The use of a sensor to measure the temperature of the tires is now forbidden.
- The width of the rim will be restricted to two sizes for the front and one size for the rear for all manufacturers. This rule will go into effect in 2012 and will end in 2012. The diameter of all wheels will be limited to 16.5 inches only.
- An exhaust system that is variable is now forbidden.
- Variable Valve Timing (VVT) and Variable Valve Lift (VVL) systems, which are powered by either electricity and/or liquid, are now forbidden.
- A connecting rod cannot be a hollow structure. However, an oil pass tunnel which is less than two mm is allowed.
- The use of a twin clutch system, which is also known as DSG), will be forbidden from now on.
- The use of an automatic transmission is now forbidden. However, an exception is made for manual transmissions which are assisted via the use of small force.
- The use of a Consecutive Variable Transmission is now forbidden.
- For the supplying of GPS units for entertainment purposes like TV broadcasting, only DORNA will be allowed to do so. These GPS units cannot connect to any CPU units of any kind of system.
- The use of an electric or electronic steering damper system is now forbidden.

These rules were additionally added on the 15th of August 2010:

- Rules for the official MotoGP post-race tests have been updated. For these tests which span a full day, all riders will be limited in the amount and specification of tires that they can use at a single test event. For all practice sessions, a maximum of eight slick tires and four wet tires will be assigned, specifically:

- Front slick tires: Two of the A specification plus two of the B specification.
- Rear slick tires: Two of the A specification plus two of the B specification.
- Front wet tires: Two of the standard specification.
- Rear wet tires: Two of the standard specification.

In addition, each rider can use one set of tires (one front and one rear) that they have retained from their assignment for the following race. These tires be either new or used (used tires still have to be mounted on wheels from the last race), and the team has to inform the tire supplier which set of tires (one front and one rear), if any, they wish to keep for the test within two hours of the last race finish.

- Manufacturer members of the MSMA who did not win at least two dry races in both the 2008 and 2009 seasons, are allowed to use nine instead of six engines total.

== 2010 Grand Prix season results ==
Round	Date	Grand Prix	Circuit	125cc winner	Moto2 winner	MotoGP winner	Report
1	11 April ‡	Qatar motorcycle Grand Prix	Losail	(Spain) Nicolás Terol	(Japan) Shoya Tomizawa	(Italy) Valentino Rossi	Report
2	2 May	(Spain) Spanish motorcycle Grand Prix	Jerez	(Spain) Pol Espargaró	(Spain) Toni Elías	(Spain) Jorge Lorenzo	Report
3	23 May	(France) French motorcycle Grand Prix	Le Mans	(Spain) Pol Espargaró	(Spain) Toni Elías	(Spain) Jorge Lorenzo	Report
4	6 June	(Italy) Italian motorcycle Grand Prix	Mugello	(Spain) Marc Márquez	(Italy) Andrea Iannone	(Spain) Dani Pedrosa	Report
5	20 June	(United Kingdom) British motorcycle Grand Prix	Silverstone	(Spain) Marc Márquez	(France) Jules Cluzel	(Spain) Jorge Lorenzo	Report
6	26 June ††	(Netherlands) Dutch TT	Assen	(Spain) Marc Márquez	(Italy) Andrea Iannone	(Spain) Jorge Lorenzo	Report
7	4 July	(Catalonia) Catalan motorcycle Grand Prix	Catalunya	(Spain) Marc Márquez	(Japan) Yuki Takahashi	(Spain) Jorge Lorenzo	Report
8	18 July	(Germany) German motorcycle Grand Prix	Sachsenring	(Spain) Marc Márquez	(Spain) Toni Elías	(Spain) Dani Pedrosa	Report
9	25 July †	United States motorcycle Grand Prix	Laguna Seca	No 125cc and Moto2 race		(Spain) Jorge Lorenzo	Report
10	15 August	Czech Republic motorcycle Grand Prix	Brno	(Spain) Nicolás Terol	(Spain) Toni Elías	(Spain) Jorge Lorenzo	Report
11	29 August	Indianapolis motorcycle Grand Prix	Indianapolis	(Spain) Nicolás Terol	(Spain) Toni Elías	(Spain) Dani Pedrosa	Report
12	5 September	San Marino and Rimini Riviera motorcycle Grand Prix	Misano	(Spain) Marc Márquez	(Spain) Toni Elías	(Spain) Dani Pedrosa	Report
13	19 September	Aragon motorcycle Grand Prix	MotorLand Aragón	(Spain) Pol Espargaró	(Italy) Andrea Iannone	(Australia) Casey Stoner	Report
14	3 October	(Japan) Japanese motorcycle Grand Prix	Motegi	(Spain) Marc Márquez	(Spain) Toni Elías	(Australia) Casey Stoner	Report
15	10 October	(Malaysia) Malaysian motorcycle Grand Prix	Sepang	(Spain) Marc Márquez	(Italy) Roberto Rolfo	(Italy) Valentino Rossi	Report
16	17 October	(Australia) Australian motorcycle Grand Prix	Phillip Island	(Spain) Marc Márquez	(San Marino) Alex de Angelis	(Australia) Casey Stoner	Report
17	31 October	(Portugal) Portuguese motorcycle Grand Prix	Estoril	(Spain) Marc Márquez	(Germany) Stefan Bradl	(Spain) Jorge Lorenzo	Report
18	7 November	Valencian Community motorcycle Grand Prix	Valencia	(United Kingdom) Bradley Smith	(Czech Republic) Karel Abraham	(Spain) Jorge Lorenzo	Report

‡ = Night Race
† = MotoGP class only
†† = Saturday race

== Participants ==
=== MotoGP participants ===
- The Fédération Internationale de Motocyclisme released 17 bikes entry list on 27 January 2010.

Team	Constructor	Motorcycle	No.	Rider	Rounds
(Italy) Ducati Marlboro Team (Italy) Ducati Team	Ducati	Desmosedici GP10	27	(Australia) Casey Stoner	All
(Italy) Ducati Marlboro Team (Italy) Ducati Team	Ducati	Desmosedici GP10	69	(United States) Nicky Hayden	All
(Italy) Pramac Racing Team	Ducati	Desmosedici GP10	36	(Finland) Mika Kallio	1–16
(Italy) Pramac Racing Team	Ducati	Desmosedici GP10	71	(Spain) Carlos Checa	17–18
(Italy) Pramac Racing Team	Ducati	Desmosedici GP10	41	(Spain) Aleix Espargaró	All
(Spain) Páginas Amarillas Aspar	Ducati	Desmosedici GP10	40	(Spain) Héctor Barberá	All
(Japan) Repsol Honda Team	Honda	RC212V	4	(Italy) Andrea Dovizioso	All
(Japan) Repsol Honda Team	Honda	RC212V	26	(Spain) Dani Pedrosa	1–14, 16–18
(Italy) San Carlo Honda Gresini	Honda	RC212V	33	(Italy) Marco Melandri	All
(Italy) San Carlo Honda Gresini	Honda	RC212V	58	(Italy) Marco Simoncelli	All
(Monaco) LCR Honda MotoGP	Honda	RC212V	14	(France) Randy de Puniet	1–8, 10–18
(Monaco) LCR Honda MotoGP	Honda	RC212V	95	(United States) Roger Lee Hayden	9
(Switzerland) Interwetten Honda MotoGP	Honda	RC212V	7	(Japan) Hiroshi Aoyama	1–5, 11–18
(Switzerland) Interwetten Honda MotoGP	Honda	RC212V	64	(Japan) Kousuke Akiyoshi	6–7
(Switzerland) Interwetten Honda MotoGP	Honda	RC212V	15	(San Marino) Alex de Angelis	8–10
(Japan) Rizla Suzuki MotoGP	Suzuki	GSV-R	19	(Spain) Álvaro Bautista	All
(Japan) Rizla Suzuki MotoGP	Suzuki	GSV-R	65	(Italy) Loris Capirossi	1-12, 14-18
(Japan) Fiat Yamaha Team	Yamaha	YZR-M1	46	(Italy) Valentino Rossi	1–4, 8–18
(Japan) Fiat Yamaha Team	Yamaha	YZR-M1	8	(Japan) Wataru Yoshikawa	7
(Japan) Fiat Yamaha Team	Yamaha	YZR-M1	99	(Spain) Jorge Lorenzo	All
(France) Monster Yamaha Tech 3	Yamaha	YZR-M1	5	(United States) Colin Edwards	All
(France) Monster Yamaha Tech 3	Yamaha	YZR-M1	11	(United States) Ben Spies	All

Key
Regular rider
Wildcard rider
Replacement rider

- All entries used Bridgestone tires.

=== Moto2 participants ===
- The Fédération Internationale de Motocyclisme released a 39-bike entry list on 27 January 2010. Also listed were Vincent Lonbois of Marc VDS Racing Team and Anthony West of MZ Racing Team, who were reserves. As it transpired, both would eventually make the grid, through other teams' misfortune, but Lonbois was later replaced by Héctor Faubel. All Moto2 competitors raced with an identical CBR600RR inline-four engine developed by Honda. Teams competed with tires supplied by Dunlop.

Team	Constructor	Motorcycle	No.	Rider	Rounds
Fimmco Speed Up	Speed Up	FTR Moto M210	2	(Hungary) Gábor Talmácsi	1–8, 10–18
Fimmco Speed Up	Speed Up	FTR Moto M210	29	(Italy) Andrea Iannone	1–8, 10–18
JiR Moto2	Motobi	TSR TSR6	3	(Italy) Simone Corsi	1–8, 10–18
JiR Moto2	Motobi	TSR TSR6	11	(Japan) Yusuke Teshima	7–8, 10–11
JiR Moto2	Motobi	TSR TSR6	15	(San Marino) Alex de Angelis	12–18
JiR Moto2	Motobi	TSR TSR6	75	(Italy) Mattia Pasini	1–6
Maquinza-SAG Team; Thai Honda PTT Singha SAG	Bimota	Bimota HB4	4	(Spain) Ricard Cardús	8, 10–14, 17–18
Maquinza-SAG Team; Thai Honda PTT Singha SAG	Bimota	Bimota HB4	14	(Thailand) Ratthapark Wilairot	1–8, 10–18
Maquinza-SAG Team; Thai Honda PTT Singha SAG	Bimota	Bimota HB4	46	(Spain) Javier Forés	15–16
Maquinza-SAG Team; Thai Honda PTT Singha SAG	Bimota	Bimota HB4	76	(Spain) Bernat Martínez	1–7
Viessmann Kiefer Racing; Vector Kiefer Racing	Suter	Suter MMX	4	(Spain) Ricard Cardús	7
Viessmann Kiefer Racing; Vector Kiefer Racing	Suter	Suter MMX	21	(Russia) Vladimir Leonov	1–8
Viessmann Kiefer Racing; Vector Kiefer Racing	Suter	Suter MMX	56	(Austria) Michael Ranseder	11–12, 14–18
Viessmann Kiefer Racing; Vector Kiefer Racing	Suter	Suter MMX	65	(Germany) Stefan Bradl	1–6, 8, 10–18
Viessmann Kiefer Racing; Vector Kiefer Racing	Suter	Suter MMX	75	(Italy) Mattia Pasini	13
Viessmann Kiefer Racing; Vector Kiefer Racing	Suter	Suter MMX	81	(Czech Republic) Patrik Vostárek	10
Jack&Jones by Antonio Banderas	FTR	FTR Moto M210	5	(Spain) Joan Olivé	12
Jack&Jones by Antonio Banderas	Promoharris	Harris Moto2	5	(Spain) Joan Olivé	1–8, 10–11, 13–18
Jack&Jones by Antonio Banderas	Promoharris	Harris Moto2	9	(United States) Kenny Noyes	1–8, 10–18
Aeroport de Castello	FTR	FTR Moto M210	6	(Spain) Alex Debón	1–8, 10–11, 13–18
MR Griful	Promoharris	Harris Moto2	7	(Spain) Dani Rivas	7
MR Griful	Promoharris	Harris Moto2	18	(Spain) Jordi Torres	7
Blusens-STX	BQR-Moto2	BQR-Moto2	7	(Spain) Dani Rivas	17
Blusens-STX	BQR-Moto2	BQR-Moto2	68	(Colombia) Yonny Hernández	1–8, 10–18
Blusens-STX	BQR-Moto2	BQR-Moto2	95	(Qatar) Mashel Al Naimi	1–3, 6–8, 10–18
Blusens-STX	BQR-Moto2	BQR-Moto2	96	(France) Anthony Delhalle	4–5
MZ Racing Team	MZ-RE Honda	MZ Moto2	8	(Australia) Anthony West	1–8, 10–18
Holiday Gym G22	Moriwaki	Moriwaki MD600	10	(Spain) Fonsi Nieto	1–8, 10–11, 13–18
Holiday Gym G22	Moriwaki	Moriwaki MD600	19	(Belgium) Xavier Siméon	5–7, 12
Holiday Gym G22	Moriwaki	Moriwaki MD600	88	(Spain) Yannick Guerra	1–4, 8, 10–18
FCC TSR	TSR	TSR TSR6	11	(Japan) Yusuke Teshima	14
Interwetten Moriwaki Moto2	Moriwaki	Moriwaki MD600	12	(Switzerland) Thomas Lüthi	1–8, 10–18
RSM Team Scot	Force GP210	Force GP210	15	(San Marino) Alex de Angelis	1–7
RSM Team Scot	Force GP210	Force GP210	59	(Italy) Niccolò Canepa	1–8
RSM Team Scot	Suter	Suter MMX	59	(Italy) Niccolò Canepa	10
Forward Racing	Suter	Suter MMX	16	(France) Jules Cluzel	1–8, 10–18
Forward Racing	Suter	Suter MMX	70	(Italy) Ferruccio Lamborghini	12
Forward Racing	Suter	Suter MMX	71	(Italy) Claudio Corti	1–8, 10–18
Cardion AB Motoracing	RSV	RSV Motor DR600	17	(Czech Republic) Karel Abraham	1–2
Cardion AB Motoracing	FTR	FTR Moto M210	17	(Czech Republic) Karel Abraham	3–8, 10–18
Holiday Gym Franchises; Holiday Gym Racing	Moriwaki	Moriwaki MD600	19	(Belgium) Xavier Siméon	3–4, 8, 10, 17–18
Gresini Racing Moto2	Moriwaki	Moriwaki MD600	24	(Spain) Toni Elías	1–8, 10–18
Gresini Racing Moto2	Moriwaki	Moriwaki MD600	51	(Italy) Michele Pirro	13
Gresini Racing Moto2	Moriwaki	Moriwaki MD600	61	(Ukraine) Vladimir Ivanov	1–8, 10–11, 14–18
Gresini Racing Moto2	Moriwaki	Moriwaki MD600	99	(Japan) Tatsuya Yamaguchi	12
Caretta Technology Race Dept.	I.C.P.	I.C.P. Textra	25	(Italy) Alex Baldolini	1–8, 10–18
Racing Team Germany	Suter	Suter MMX	28	(Japan) Kazuki Watanabe	13–16
Racing Team Germany	Suter	Suter MMX	31	(Spain) Carmelo Morales	17–18
Racing Team Germany	Suter	Suter MMX	41	(Germany) Arne Tode	1–8, 10–11
Tenerife 40 Pons	Pons Kalex	Kalex Moto2	31	(Spain) Carmelo Morales	7
Tenerife 40 Pons	Pons Kalex	Kalex Moto2	40	(Spain) Sergio Gadea	1–8, 10–18
Tenerife 40 Pons	Pons Kalex	Kalex Moto2	50	(Australia) Damian Cudlin	8
Tenerife 40 Pons	Pons Kalex	Kalex Moto2	80	(Spain) Axel Pons	1–6, 10–18
MGM Racing Performance MC	Kalex	Kalex Moto2	32	(Germany) Sascha Hommel	8
American Honda	Moriwaki	Moriwaki MD600	34	(United States) Roger Lee Hayden	11
Tech 3 Racing	Tech 3	Tech 3 Mistral 610	35	(Italy) Raffaele De Rosa	1–8, 10–18
Tech 3 Racing	Tech 3	Tech 3 Mistral 610	72	(Japan) Yuki Takahashi	1–8, 10–18
Italtrans S.T.R.	Suter	Suter MMX	39	(Venezuela) Robertino Pietri	1–8, 10–18
Italtrans S.T.R.	Suter	Suter MMX	44	(Italy) Roberto Rolfo	1–8, 10–18
Italtrans S.T.R.	Suter	Suter MMX	75	(Italy) Mattia Pasini	12
GP Tech	FTR	FTR Moto M210	42	(United States) Jason DiSalvo	11
MIR Racing	MIR	MIR Moto2	43	(Spain) Román Ramos	13, 18
Marc VDS Racing Team	Suter	Suter MMX	45	(United Kingdom) Scott Redding	1–8, 10–18
Marc VDS Racing Team	Suter	Suter MMX	55	(Spain) Héctor Faubel	1–8, 10–18
Twelve Motorsport/Motorrad	AJR	AJR Moto2	46	(Spain) Javier Forés	18
Matteoni C.P. Racing	Moriwaki	Moriwaki MD600	47	(Australia) Wayne Maxwell	16
Matteoni C.P. Racing	Moriwaki	Moriwaki MD600	52	(Czech Republic) Lukáš Pešek	1–8, 10–12
Matteoni C.P. Racing	Moriwaki	Moriwaki MD600	64	(Colombia) Santiago Hernández	13
Matteoni C.P. Racing	Moriwaki	Moriwaki MD600	70	(Italy) Ferruccio Lamborghini	14–15, 17–18
Technomag-CIP	Suter	Suter MMX	48	(Japan) Shoya Tomizawa	1–8, 10–12
Technomag-CIP	Suter	Suter MMX	54	(Turkey) Kenan Sofuoğlu	17–18
Technomag-CIP	Suter	Suter MMX	77	(Switzerland) Dominique Aegerter	1–8, 10–18
Qatar Endurance Racing Team; Qatar Moto2 Team	BQR-Moto2	BQR-Moto2	49	(Australia) Alex Cudlin	16
Qatar Endurance Racing Team; Qatar Moto2 Team	BQR-Moto2	BQR-Moto2	96	(France) Anthony Delhalle	1
WTR San Marino Team	ADV	ADV AT02	53	(France) Valentin Debise	1–8, 10–18
Monlau Joey Darcey	FTR	FTR Moto M210	54	(United Kingdom) Kev Coghlan	5, 13
M Racing	Bimota	Bimota HB4	59	(Italy) Niccolò Canepa	12–13
M Racing	Bimota	Bimota HB4	66	(Japan) Hiromichi Kunikawa	14–18
Mapfre Aspar Team	RSV	RSV Motor DR600	60	(Spain) Julián Simón	1–2
Mapfre Aspar Team	RSV	RSV Motor DR600	63	(France) Mike Di Meglio	1–2
Mapfre Aspar Team	Suter	Suter MMX	60	(Spain) Julián Simón	3–8, 10–18
Mapfre Aspar Team	Suter	Suter MMX	63	(France) Mike Di Meglio	3–8, 10–18
Moriwaki Racing	Moriwaki	Moriwaki MD600	83	(Japan) Shogo Moriwaki	14
Petronas SIC TWMR Malaysia	Moriwaki	Moriwaki MD600	87	(Malaysia) Mohamad Zamri Baba	15
Andalucia Cajasol	Moriwaki	Moriwaki MD600	91	(Spain) Iván Moreno	2
Llados Racing Team	AJR	AJR Moto2	92	(Spain) Amadeo Lladós	2
Burning Blood Racing Team	RBB	RBB Moto2	93	(Japan) Koki Takahashi	14

Key
Regular rider
Wildcard rider
Replacement rider

=== 125cc participants ===
- The Fédération Internationale de Motocyclisme released a 27-bike entry list on 27 January 2010.

Team	Constructor	Motorcycle	No.	Rider	Rounds
Ongetta Team; AirAsia Sepang Int. Circuit	Aprilia	Aprilia RSW 125	5	(France) Alexis Masbou	1–8, 10–12
Ongetta Team; AirAsia Sepang Int. Circuit	Aprilia	Aprilia RSW 125	16	(Spain) Pedro Rodríguez	13
Ongetta Team; AirAsia Sepang Int. Circuit	Aprilia	Aprilia RSW 125	37	(France) Robin Barbosa	13
Ongetta Team; AirAsia Sepang Int. Circuit	Aprilia	Aprilia RSW 125	50	(Norway) Sturla Fagerhaug	1–8, 10, 12–18
Ongetta Team; AirAsia Sepang Int. Circuit	Aprilia	Aprilia RSW 125	56	(Hungary) Péter Sebestyén	18
Ongetta Team; AirAsia Sepang Int. Circuit	Aprilia	Aprilia RSW 125	63	(Malaysia) Zulfahmi Khairuddin	1–8, 10–18
Ongetta Team; AirAsia Sepang Int. Circuit	Aprilia	Aprilia RSW 125	87	(Italy) Luca Marconi	1–2, 4–8, 10–12, 14–17
Ongetta Team; AirAsia Sepang Int. Circuit	Aprilia	Aprilia RSA 125	94	(Germany) Jonas Folger	1–8, 10–15, 17–18
Ongetta Team; AirAsia Sepang Int. Circuit	Aprilia	Aprilia RSW 125	96	(Italy) Tommaso Gabrielli	14–18
Tuenti Racing	Derbi	Derbi RSA 125	7	(Spain) Efrén Vázquez	1–8, 10–18
Tuenti Racing	Derbi	Derbi RSA 125	44	(Spain) Pol Espargaró	1–8, 10–18
Avant Mitsubishi Ajo; Aeroport de Castello - Ajo; Red Bull Ajo Motorsport	Derbi	Derbi RSA 125	11	(Germany) Sandro Cortese	1–8, 10–18
Avant Mitsubishi Ajo; Aeroport de Castello - Ajo; Red Bull Ajo Motorsport	Aprilia	Aprilia RSA 125	26	(Spain) Adrián Martín	1–8, 10–18
Avant Mitsubishi Ajo; Aeroport de Castello - Ajo; Red Bull Ajo Motorsport	Derbi	Derbi RSA 125	93	(Spain) Marc Márquez	1–8, 10–18
Blusens-STX	Aprilia	Aprilia RSA 125	12	(Spain) Esteve Rabat	1–8, 10–18
WTR San Marino Team	Aprilia	Aprilia RSW 125	14	(France) Johann Zarco	1–8, 10–18
Fontana Racing	Aprilia	Aprilia RSA 125	15	(Italy) Simone Grotzkyj	4–8, 10–18
Fontana Racing	Aprilia	Aprilia RSA 125	51	(Italy) Riccardo Moretti	2–3
Catalunya Racing Team	Aprilia	Aprilia RSW 125	17	(Spain) Eduard López	7
Catalunya Racing Team	Aprilia	Aprilia RSW 125	55	(Spain) Isaac Viñales	7
Catalunya Racing Team	Aprilia	Aprilia RSW 125	57	(Spain) Isaac Viñales	2
Andalucía Cajasol	Aprilia	Aprilia RSA 125	23	(Spain) Alberto Moncayo	1–8, 10–18
Andalucía Cajasol	Aprilia	Aprilia RSA 125	99	(United Kingdom) Danny Webb	1–8, 10–18
Matteoni C.P. Racing	Aprilia	Aprilia RSW 125	27	(Italy) Alejandro Pardo	13
Matteoni C.P. Racing	Aprilia	Aprilia RSW 125	32	(Italy) Lorenzo Savadori	1–8, 10–12, 14–18
Hune Racing	Aprilia	Aprilia RSW 125	28	(Spain) Josep Rodríguez	13
Monlau Competicion	Derbi	Derbi RSA 125	31	(Finland) Niklas Ajo	18
Stipa-Molenaar Racing GP	Aprilia	Aprilia RSA 125	35	(Switzerland) Randy Krummenacher	1–8, 10–18
Stipa-Molenaar Racing GP	Aprilia	Aprilia RSA 125	39	(Spain) Luis Salom	3–8, 10–18
Stipa-Molenaar Racing GP	Aprilia	Aprilia RSA 125	80	(France) Quentin Jacquet	1–2
Lambretta Reparto Corse	Lambretta	Lambretta 125	36	(Spain) Joan Perelló	12
Lambretta Reparto Corse	Lambretta	Lambretta 125	39	(Spain) Luis Salom	1–2
Lambretta Reparto Corse	Lambretta	Lambretta 125	52	(United Kingdom) Danny Kent	14–18
Lambretta Reparto Corse	Lambretta	Lambretta 125	55	(Spain) Isaac Viñales	10–11, 13
Lambretta Reparto Corse	Lambretta	Lambretta 125	60	(Netherlands) Michael van der Mark	3–8
Lambretta Reparto Corse	Lambretta	Lambretta 125	72	(Italy) Marco Ravaioli	1–8, 10–18
H43/Hernandez Racing	Aprilia	Aprilia RSW 125	37	(France) Robin Barbosa	17
Bancaja Aspar Team	Aprilia	Aprilia RSA 125	38	(United Kingdom) Bradley Smith	1–8, 10–18
Bancaja Aspar Team	Aprilia	Aprilia RSA 125	40	(Spain) Nicolás Terol	1–7, 10–18
Racing Sayama	Honda	Honda RS125R	42	(Japan) Syunya Mori	14
Team Nobby	Honda	Honda RS125R	43	(Japan) Takehiro Yamamoto	14
Eurotwins Brisbane	Honda	Honda RS125R	45	(Australia) Jordan Zamora	16
HookRacing.com	Aprilia	Aprilia RSW 125	46	(Australia) Joshua Hook	16
Racetrix	Honda	Honda RS125R	47	(Australia) Levi Day	16
Moto FGR	Honda	Honda RS125R	48	(Czech Republic) Ladislav Chmelík	10
Moto 82	Honda	Honda RS125R	49	(Czech Republic) Andrea Toušková	10
Junior GP Racing Team FMI; Junior GP FMI	Aprilia	Aprilia RSW 125	51	(Italy) Riccardo Moretti	4
Junior GP Racing Team FMI; Junior GP FMI	Aprilia	Aprilia RSW 125	79	(Italy) Giovanni Bonati	12
Junior GP Racing Team FMI; Junior GP FMI	Aprilia	Aprilia RSW 125	92	(Italy) Luigi Morciano	4, 10, 17
Junior GP Racing Team FMI; Junior GP FMI	Aprilia	Aprilia RSW 125	95	(Italy) Alessandro Tonucci	4, 10, 12, 17
Junior GP Racing Team FMI; Junior GP FMI	Aprilia	Aprilia RSW 125	97	(Italy) Armando Pontone	4, 12
Aztec Grand Prix	Honda	Honda RS125R	52	(United Kingdom) Danny Kent	5
Aztec Grand Prix	Honda	Honda RS125R	77	(Republic of Ireland) Andrew Reid	5
CBC Corse	Aprilia	Aprilia RSW 125	53	(Netherlands) Jasper Iwema	1–8, 10–17
CBC Corse	Aprilia	Aprilia RSW 125	55	(Spain) Isaac Viñales	18
CBC Corse	Aprilia	Aprilia RSW 125	69	(France) Louis Rossi	1–8, 10–18
Aprilia RSW Racing	Aprilia	Aprilia RSW 125	54	(Australia) Nicky Diles	16
Right Guard Racing	Aprilia	Aprilia RSW 125	56	(Hungary) Peter Sebestyén	7, 13
BRP Racing	Aprilia	Aprilia RSW 125	57	(Australia) Joel Taylor	16
SAG Castrol	Honda	Honda RS125R	58	(Spain) Joan Perelló	2, 7, 13, 18
SAG Castrol	Honda	Honda RS125R	59	(Spain) Johnny Rosell	2, 7, 18
Team Sachsenring	Aprilia	Aprilia RSW 125	60	(Netherlands) Michael van der Mark	2
Team Sachsenring	Aprilia	Aprilia RSW 125	85	(Germany) Eric Hübsch	8
Freudenberg Racing Team	KTM	KTM 125 FRR	61	(Germany) Daniel Kartheininger	8
Freudenberg Racing Team	KTM	KTM 125 FRR	68	(Germany) Toni Finsterbusch	6, 8
LHF Project Racing	Honda	Honda RS125R	62	(Germany) Marvin Fritz	8
RV Racing	Honda	Honda RS125R	64	(Netherlands) Ernst Dubbink	6
Team Holland Mototechnic	Aprilia	Aprilia RSW 125	65	(Netherlands) Roy Pouw	6
RacingTeam Bijsterbosch	Honda	Honda RS125R	66	(Netherlands) Pepijn Bijsterbosch	6
Jerrys Racing	Honda	Honda RS125R	67	(Netherlands) Jerry van de Bunt	6
KRP; KRP Bradley Smith Racing; KRP MMCG	Honda	Honda RS125R	70	(United Kingdom) John McPhee	18
KRP; KRP Bradley Smith Racing; KRP MMCG	Honda	Honda RS125R	73	(United Kingdom) Taylor Mackenzie	5, 18
Racing Team Germany	Aprilia	Aprilia RSW 125	71	(Japan) Tomoyoshi Koyama	1–8, 10–18
Racing Team Germany	Aprilia	Aprilia RSW 125	84	(Czech Republic) Jakub Kornfeil	1–8, 10–18
RS Earnshaws Motorcycles	Honda	Honda RS125R	74	(United Kingdom) James Lodge	5
Colin Appleyard/Macadam Racing	Honda	Honda RS125R	75	(United Kingdom) Deane Brown	5
Team Semprucci	Aprilia	Aprilia RSW 125	76	(Italy) Francesco Mauriello	12
Interwetten Honda 125	Honda	Honda RS125R	78	(Germany) Marcel Schrötter	1–8, 10–18
Equipe de France Vitesse Espoir	Honda	Honda RS125R	81	(France) Grégory Di Carlo	3
Equipe de France Vitesse Espoir	Honda	Honda RS125R	82	(France) Kevin Szalai	3
Xtreme Racing Team	Honda	Honda RS125R	83	(France) Morgan Berchet	3
Thomas Sabo Team Hanusch	Honda	Honda RS125R	86	(Germany) Kevin Hanus	8, 13
18 Garage Racing Team	Honda	Honda RS125R	88	(Japan) Hikari Okubo	14
Endurance	Honda	Honda RS125R	89	(Japan) Yuma Yahagi	14
Veloce Racing	Aprilia	Aprilia RSW 125	90	(United States) Kristian Lee Turner	11
Team Tec2	Yamaha	Yamaha TZ125	91	(Japan) Sasuke Shinozaki	14
Racing Team Gabrielli	Aprilia	Aprilia RSW 125	96	(Italy) Tommaso Gabrielli	4, 12
Faenza Racing	Aprilia	Aprilia RSW 125	98	(Italy) Mattia Tarozzi	4

Key
Regular rider
Wildcard rider
Replacement rider

- All entries used Dunlop tires.

== Standings ==
=== MotoGP standings ===
Scoring system

Points were awarded to the top fifteen finishers. Rider had to finish the race to earn points.

Position	**1st**	**2nd**	**3rd**	**4th**	**5th**	**6th**	**7th**	**8th**	**9th**	**10th**	**11th**	**12th**	**13th**	**14th**	**15th**
Points	25	20	16	13	11	10	9	8	7	6	5	4	3	2	1

==== Riders' standings ====
- Rounds marked with a light blue background were under wet race conditions or stopped by rain.
- Riders marked with light blue background were eligible for Rookie of the Year awards.

Pos	Rider	Bike	Team	QAT (Qatar)	SPA (Spain)	FRA (France)	ITA (Italy)	GBR (United Kingdom)	NED (Netherlands)	CAT (Catalonia)	GER (Germany)	USA (United States)	CZE (Czech Republic)	INP (Indianapolis)	RSM (San Marino)	ARA (Aragon)	JPN (Japan)	MAL (Malaysia)	AUS (Australia)	POR (Portugal)	VAL (Valencian Community)	Pts
1	(Spain) Jorge Lorenzo	Yamaha	Fiat Yamaha Team	2	1	1	2	**1**	**1**	**1**	**2**	**1**	1	3	2	4	4	**3**	2	**1**	1	383
2	(Spain) Dani Pedrosa	Honda	Repsol Honda Team	7	**2**	5	**1**	8	2	2	1	Ret	**2**	1	**1**	2	DNS		DNS	8	7	245
3	(Italy) Valentino Rossi	Yamaha	Fiat Yamaha Team	1	3	**2**	DNS				4	3	5	4	3	6	3	1	3	2	3	233
4	(Australia) Casey Stoner	Ducati	Ducati Team	**Ret**	5	Ret	4	5	3	3	3	2	3	Ret	5	**1**	1	Ret	**1**	Ret	**2**	225
5	(Italy) Andrea Dovizioso	Honda	Repsol Honda Team	3	6	3	3	2	5	14	5	4	Ret	5	4	Ret	**2**	2	Ret	3	5	206
6	(United States) Ben Spies	Yamaha	Monster Yamaha Tech 3	5	Ret	Ret	7	3	4	6	8	6	4	**2**	6	5	8	4	5	DNS	4	176
7	(United States) Nicky Hayden	Ducati	Ducati Team	4	4	4	Ret	4	7	8	7	5	6	6	Ret	3	12	6	4	5	Ret	163
8	(Italy) Marco Simoncelli	Honda	San Carlo Honda Gresini	11	11	10	9	7	9	Ret	6	Ret	11	7	14	7	6	8	6	4	6	125
9	(France) Randy de Puniet	Honda	LCR Honda MotoGP	6	9	7	6	6	6	4	Ret		10	13	13	Ret	9	10	10	6	10	116
10	(Italy) Marco Melandri	Honda	San Carlo Honda Gresini	13	8	6	5	Ret	DNS	9	10	8	8	Ret	10	9	11	9	9	9	13	103
11	(United States) Colin Edwards	Yamaha	Monster Yamaha Tech 3	8	12	12	13	9	8	11	Ret	7	7	Ret	7	12	5	NC	7	7	12	103
12	(Spain) Héctor Barberá	Ducati	Páginas Amarillas Aspar	12	13	8	12	11	12	10	9	Ret	9	10	9	11	13	11	14	10	8	90
13	(Spain) Álvaro Bautista	Suzuki	Rizla Suzuki MotoGP	Ret	10	DNS	14	12	14	5	Ret	Ret	Ret	8	8	8	7	5	12	11	9	85
14	(Spain) Aleix Espargaró	Ducati	Pramac Racing Team	Ret	15	9	8	10	10	Ret	Ret	Ret	12	9	11	10	14	Ret	8	Ret	11	65
15	(Japan) Hiroshi Aoyama	Honda	Interwetten Honda MotoGP	10	14	11	11	DNS						12	12	13	10	7	13	12	14	53
16	(Italy) Loris Capirossi	Suzuki	Rizla Suzuki MotoGP	9	Ret	Ret	10	Ret	13	7	11	10	Ret	11	Ret		Ret	Ret	DNS	13	Ret	44
17	(Finland) Mika Kallio	Ducati	Pramac Racing Team	Ret	7	13	Ret	13	11	12	Ret	9	Ret	Ret	Ret	14	15	12	11			43
18	(San Marino) Alex de Angelis	Honda	Interwetten Honda MotoGP								12	12	13									11
19	(United States) Roger Lee Hayden	Honda	LCR Honda MotoGP									11										5
20	(Japan) Kousuke Akiyoshi	Honda	Interwetten Honda MotoGP						15	13												4
21	(Spain) Carlos Checa	Ducati	Pramac Racing Team																	Ret	15	1
22	(Japan) Wataru Yoshikawa	Yamaha	Fiat Yamaha Team							15												1
Pos	Rider	Bike	Team	QAT (Qatar)	SPA (Spain)	FRA (France)	ITA (Italy)	GBR (United Kingdom)	NED (Netherlands)	CAT (Catalonia)	GER (Germany)	USA (United States)	CZE (Czech Republic)	INP (Indianapolis)	RSM (San Marino)	ARA (Aragon)	JPN (Japan)	MAL (Malaysia)	AUS (Australia)	POR (Portugal)	VAL (Valencian Community)	Pts

Colour	Result
Gold	Winner
Silver	Second place
Bronze	Third place
Green	Points classification
Blue	Non-points classification
Blue	Non-classified finish (NC)
Purple	Retired, not classified (Ret)
Red	Did not qualify (DNQ)
Red	Did not pre-qualify (DNPQ)
Black	Disqualified (DSQ)
White	Did not start (DNS)
White	Withdrew (WD)
White	Race cancelled (C)
Blank	Did not practice (DNP)
Blank	Did not arrive (DNA)
Blank	Excluded (EX)

**Bold** – Pole
Italics – Fastest Lap

==== Constructors' standings ====
- Each constructor got the same number of points as their best placed rider in each race.
- Rounds marked with a light blue background were under wet race conditions or stopped by rain.

Pos	Constructor	QAT (Qatar)	SPA (Spain)	FRA (France)	ITA (Italy)	GBR (United Kingdom)	NED (Netherlands)	CAT (Catalonia)	GER (Germany)	USA (United States)	CZE (Czech Republic)	INP (Indianapolis)	RSM (San Marino)	ARA (Aragon)	JPN (Japan)	MAL (Malaysia)	AUS (Australia)	POR (Portugal)	VAL (Valencian Community)	Pts
1	(Japan) Yamaha	1	1	1	2	1	1	1	2	1	1	2	2	4	3	1	2	1	1	404
2	(Japan) Honda	3	2	3	1	2	2	2	1	4	2	1	1	2	2	2	6	3	5	342
3	(Italy) Ducati	4	4	4	4	4	3	3	3	2	3	6	5	1	1	6	1	5	2	286
4	(Japan) Suzuki	9	10	Ret	10	12	13	5	11	10	Ret	8	8	8	7	5	12	11	9	108
Pos	Constructor	QAT (Qatar)	SPA (Spain)	FRA (France)	ITA (Italy)	GBR (United Kingdom)	NED (Netherlands)	CAT (Catalonia)	GER (Germany)	USA (United States)	CZE (Czech Republic)	INP (Indianapolis)	RSM (San Marino)	ARA (Aragon)	JPN (Japan)	MAL (Malaysia)	AUS (Australia)	POR (Portugal)	VAL (Valencian Community)	Pts

==== Teams' standings ====
- Each team got the total points scored by their two riders, including replacement riders. In one rider team, only the points scored by that rider was counted. Wildcard riders did not score points.
- Rounds marked with a light blue background were under wet race conditions or stopped by rain.

Pos	Team	Bike No.	QAT (Qatar)	SPA (Spain)	FRA (France)	ITA (Italy)	GBR (United Kingdom)	NED (Netherlands)	CAT (Catalonia)	GER (Germany)	USA (United States)	CZE (Czech Republic)	INP (Indianapolis)	RSM (San Marino)	ARA (Aragon)	JPN (Japan)	MAL (Malaysia)	AUS (Australia)	POR (Portugal)	VAL (Valencian Community)	Pts
1	(Japan) Fiat Yamaha Team	8							15												617
1	(Japan) Fiat Yamaha Team	46	1	3	**2**	DNS				4	3	5	4	3	6	3	1	3	2	3	617
1	(Japan) Fiat Yamaha Team	99	2	1	1	2	**1**	**1**	**1**	**2**	**1**	1	3	2	4	4	**3**	2	**1**	1	617
2	(Japan) Repsol Honda Team	4	3	6	3	3	2	5	14	5	4	Ret	5	4	Ret	**2**	2	Ret	3	5	451
2	(Japan) Repsol Honda Team	26	7	**2**	5	**1**	8	2	2	1	Ret	**2**	1	**1**	2	DNS		DNS	8	7	451
3	(Italy) Ducati Team	27	**Ret**	5	Ret	4	5	3	3	3	2	3	Ret	5	**1**	1	Ret	**1**	Ret	**2**	388
3	(Italy) Ducati Team	69	4	4	4	Ret	4	7	8	7	5	6	6	Ret	3	12	6	4	5	Ret	388
4	(France) Monster Yamaha Tech 3	5	8	12	12	13	9	8	11	Ret	7	7	Ret	7	12	5	NC	7	7	12	279
4	(France) Monster Yamaha Tech 3	11	5	Ret	Ret	7	3	4	6	8	6	4	**2**	6	5	8	4	5	DNS	4	279
5	(Italy) San Carlo Honda Gresini	33	13	8	6	5	Ret	DNS	9	10	8	8	Ret	10	9	11	9	9	9	13	228
5	(Italy) San Carlo Honda Gresini	58	11	11	10	9	7	9	Ret	6	Ret	11	7	14	7	6	8	6	4	6	228
6	(Japan) Rizla Suzuki MotoGP	19	Ret	10	DNS	14	12	14	5	Ret	Ret	Ret	8	8	8	7	5	12	11	9	129
6	(Japan) Rizla Suzuki MotoGP	65	9	Ret	Ret	10	Ret	13	7	11	10	Ret	11	Ret		Ret	Ret	DNS	13	Ret	129
7	(Monaco) LCR Honda MotoGP	14	6	9	7	6	6	6	4	Ret		10	13	13	Ret	9	10	10	6	10	121
7	(Monaco) LCR Honda MotoGP	95									11										121
8	(Italy) Pramac Racing Team	36	Ret	7	13	Ret	13	11	12	Ret	9	Ret	Ret	Ret	14	15	12	11			108
8	(Italy) Pramac Racing Team	41	Ret	15	9	8	10	10	Ret	Ret	Ret	12	9	11	10	14	Ret	8	Ret	11	108
8	(Italy) Pramac Racing Team	71																	Ret	15	108
9	(Spain) Páginas Amarillas Aspar	40	12	13	8	12	11	12	10	9	Ret	9	10	9	11	13	11	14	10	8	90
10	(Switzerland) Interwetten Honda MotoGP	7	10	14	11	11	DNS						12	12	13	10	7	13	12	14	68
10	(Switzerland) Interwetten Honda MotoGP	15								12	12	13									68
10	(Switzerland) Interwetten Honda MotoGP	64						15	13												68
Pos	Team	Bike No.	QAT (Qatar)	SPA (Spain)	FRA (France)	ITA (Italy)	GBR (United Kingdom)	NED (Netherlands)	CAT (Catalonia)	GER (Germany)	USA (United States)	CZE (Czech Republic)	INP (Indianapolis)	RSM (San Marino)	ARA (Aragon)	JPN (Japan)	MAL (Malaysia)	AUS (Australia)	POR (Portugal)	VAL (Valencian Community)	Pts

=== Moto2 standings ===
Scoring system

Points were awarded to the top fifteen finishers. Rider had to finish the race to earn points.

Position	**1st**	**2nd**	**3rd**	**4th**	**5th**	**6th**	**7th**	**8th**	**9th**	**10th**	**11th**	**12th**	**13th**	**14th**	**15th**
Points	25	20	16	13	11	10	9	8	7	6	5	4	3	2	1

==== Riders' standings ====
- Rounds marked with a light blue background were under wet race conditions or stopped by rain.

Pos	Rider	Bike	QAT (Qatar)	SPA (Spain)	FRA (France)	ITA (Italy)	GBR (United Kingdom)	NED (Netherlands)	CAT (Catalonia)	GER (Germany)	CZE (Czech Republic)	INP (Indianapolis)	RSM (San Marino)	ARA (Aragon)	JPN (Japan)	MAL (Malaysia)	AUS (Australia)	POR (Portugal)	VAL (Valencian Community)	Pts
1	(Spain) Toni Elías	Moriwaki	**4**	1	1	5	10	2	5	1	1	1	**1**	4	1	4	7	Ret	**30**	271
2	(Spain) Julián Simón	RSV	Ret	8																201
2	(Spain) Julián Simón	Suter			2	9	3	6	3	Ret	5	**2**	2	2	**2**	**21**	4	12	3	201
3	(Italy) Andrea Iannone	Speed Up	19	Ret	4	**1**	12	**1**	**13**	**2**	3	4	Ret	**1**	13	3	3	21	2	199
4	(Switzerland) Thomas Lüthi	Moriwaki	7	3	19	4	2	3	2	Ret	11	7	3	10	8	Ret	11	16	4	156
5	(Italy) Simone Corsi	Motobi	8	5	3	3	Ret	12	6	Ret	8	5	4	5	11	10	8	14	7	138
6	(Hungary) Gábor Talmácsi	Speed Up	9	9	5	7	Ret	13	11	6	6	8	7	3	21	Ret	18	**8**	10	109
7	(France) Jules Cluzel	Suter	3	11	Ret	Ret	1	7	14	12	4	Ret	6	6	16	9	23	17	11	106
8	(United Kingdom) Scott Redding	Suter	23	16	11	21	4	11	Ret	Ret	22	3	Ret	8	5	Ret	2	4	5	102
9	(Germany) Stefan Bradl	Suter	Ret	14	9	14	Ret	19		9	9	Ret	5	9	7	7	5	1	Ret	97
10	(Czech Republic) Karel Abraham	RSV	14	28																96
10	(Czech Republic) Karel Abraham	FTR			Ret	17	Ret	9	4	5	DNS	DNQ	DNS	18	3	6	10	10	1	96
11	(San Marino) Alex de Angelis	Force GP210	Ret	DNS	Ret	11	DNS	20	10											95
11	(San Marino) Alex de Angelis	Motobi											Ret	Ret	4	2	**1**	3	6	95
12	(Japan) Yuki Takahashi	Tech 3	Ret	4	Ret	8	18	10	1	Ret	2	26	Ret	12	6	Ret	17	26	18	86
13	(Japan) Shoya Tomizawa^{†}	Suter	1	**2**	Ret	6	6	5	Ret	18	**10**	DNS	Ret^{†}							82
14	(Italy) Roberto Rolfo	Suter	5	12	10	18	24	Ret	Ret	3	Ret	25	10	19	9	1	26	Ret	25	75
15	(Switzerland) Dominique Aegerter	Suter	11	13	30	16	9	18	Ret	8	16	11	8	7	12	8	13	9	9	74
16	(Spain) Alex Debón	FTR	2	25	16	10	5	DNS	Ret	Ret	7	Ret		22	10	5	9	DNS	13	73
17	(Spain) Sergio Gadea	Pons Kalex	10	6	6	2	15	23	25	Ret	14	6	Ret	20	17	Ret	24	22	8	67
18	(Spain) Fonsi Nieto	Moriwaki	13	21	8	15	11	Ret	8	4	13	DNS		Ret	Ret	19	12	24	Ret	45
19	(Italy) Alex Baldolini	I.C.P.	12	32	14	13	Ret	16	Ret	11	17	16	Ret	Ret	Ret	12	20	2	17	38
20	(France) Mike Di Meglio	RSV	16	22																34
20	(France) Mike Di Meglio	Suter			20	Ret	7	8	Ret	Ret	20	12	Ret	13	18	26	6	DNQ	26	34
21	(Colombia) Yonny Hernández	BQR-Moto2	Ret	10	12	20	Ret	15	12	10	23	15	11	Ret	Ret	13	19	18	14	32
22	(Thailand) Ratthapark Wilairot	Bimota	17	17	7	Ret	13	4	Ret	17	21	Ret	12	15	24	16	22	Ret	22	30
23	(Australia) Anthony West	MZ-RE Honda	Ret	15	26	27	17	Ret	9	13	18	10	17	21	23	24	21	7	27	26
24	(United States) Kenny Noyes	Promoharris	18	7	**Ret**	26	21	22	7	21	Ret	19	24	Ret	22	18	31	Ret	12	22
25	(Italy) Claudio Corti	Suter	20	18	15	22	**30**	17	22	22	26	13	9	11	14	15	15	19	19	20
26	(Spain) Héctor Faubel	Suter	22	Ret	Ret	12	Ret	25	Ret	25	12	Ret	16	17	30	11	Ret	11	21	18
27	(Italy) Raffaele De Rosa	Tech 3	Ret	20	Ret	Ret	28	27	16	Ret	15	Ret	13	Ret	15	Ret	16	6	24	15
28	(Italy) Mattia Pasini	Motobi	6	Ret	Ret	Ret	Ret	14												12
28	(Italy) Mattia Pasini	Suter											Ret	Ret						12
29	(Turkey) Kenan Sofuoğlu	Suter																5	Ret	11
30	(Belgium) Xavier Siméon	Moriwaki			Ret	19	8	Ret	24	15	19		19					23	15	10
31	(Australia) Damian Cudlin	Pons Kalex								7										9
32	(United States) Jason DiSalvo	FTR										9								7
33	(Spain) Axel Pons	Pons Kalex	Ret	19	Ret	Ret	23	DNS			25	14	18	Ret	19	17	14	13	Ret	7
34	(Czech Republic) Lukáš Pešek	Moriwaki	15	26	13	Ret	20	Ret	Ret	Ret	Ret	20	15							5
35	(Austria) Michael Ranseder	Suter										DNS	14		20	14	Ret	Ret	20	4
36	(Italy) Michele Pirro	Moriwaki												14						2
37	(Ukraine) Vladimir Ivanov	Moriwaki	26	23	21	Ret	19	21	18	14	27	Ret			32	Ret	29	25	29	2
38	(Germany) Arne Tode	Suter	21	29	18	24	14	Ret	17	27	Ret	23								2
39	(Venezuela) Robertino Pietri	Suter	28	24	23	Ret	27	26	Ret	Ret	29	21	29	Ret	31	27	27	15	Ret	1
40	(Japan) Yusuke Teshima	Motobi							15	19	Ret	Ret								1
40	(Japan) Yusuke Teshima	TSR													Ret					1
	(Italy) Niccolò Canepa	Force GP210	27	Ret	17	28	16	24	Ret	20										0
	(Italy) Niccolò Canepa	Suter									28									0
	(Italy) Niccolò Canepa	Bimota											28	26						0
	(France) Valentin Debise	ADV	24	31	22	23	26	30	20	16	32	18	22	27	26	20	28	Ret	Ret	0
	(Spain) Román Ramos	MIR Racing												16					23	0
	(Spain) Javier Forés	Bimota														Ret	25			0
	(Spain) Javier Forés	AJR																	16	0
	(United States) Roger Lee Hayden	Moriwaki										17								0
	(Spain) Jordi Torres	Promoharris							19											0
	(Spain) Ricard Cardús	Suter							23											0
	(Spain) Ricard Cardús	Bimota								Ret	24	Ret	20	Ret	27			Ret	DNS	0
	(Spain) Carmelo Morales	Pons Kalex							Ret											0
	(Spain) Carmelo Morales	Suter																20	Ret	0
	(Spain) Joan Olivé	Promoharris	32	Ret	24	DNS	31	32	21	Ret	31	22		28	Ret	23	34	DNQ	28	0
	(Spain) Joan Olivé	FTR											21							0
	(United Kingdom) Kev Coghlan	FTR					22							Ret						0
	(Malaysia) Mohamad Zamri Baba	Moriwaki														22				0
	(Italy) Ferruccio Lamborghini	Suter											23							0
	(Italy) Ferruccio Lamborghini	Moriwaki													33	Ret		27	Ret	0
	(Germany) Sascha Hommel	Kalex								23										0
	(Colombia) Santiago Hernández	Moriwaki												23						0
	(Spain) Yannick Guerra	Moriwaki	30	33	25	30				26	33	24	26	24	29	Ret	33	28	31	0
	(Russia) Vladimir Leonov	Suter	Ret	DNS	27	25	29	29	Ret	24										0
	(Japan) Kazuki Watanabe	Suter												25	25	25	32			0
	(Spain) Bernat Martínez	Bimota	29	27	28	29	25	28	Ret											0
	(France) Anthony Delhalle	BQR-Moto2	25			Ret	Ret													0
	(Japan) Tatsuya Yamaguchi	Moriwaki											25							0
	(Qatar) Mashel Al Naimi	BQR-Moto2	31	34	29			31	26	Ret	30	Ret	27	Ret	28	29	Ret	29	32	0
	(Japan) Hiromichi Kunikawa	Bimota													Ret	28	Ret	DNQ	33	0
	(Spain) Amadeo Lladós	AJR		30																0
	(Australia) Alex Cudlin	BQR-Moto2															30			0
	(Japan) Koki Takahashi	RBB													34					0
	(Spain) Dani Rivas	Promoharris							Ret											0
	(Spain) Dani Rivas	BQR-Moto2																Ret		0
	(Spain) Iván Moreno	Moriwaki		Ret																0
	(Czech Republic) Patrik Vostárek	Suter									Ret									0
	(Australia) Wayne Maxwell	Moriwaki															DSQ			0
	(Japan) Shogo Moriwaki	Moriwaki													DNS					0
Pos	Rider	Bike	QAT (Qatar)	SPA (Spain)	FRA (France)	ITA (Italy)	GBR (United Kingdom)	NED (Netherlands)	CAT (Catalonia)	GER (Germany)	CZE (Czech Republic)	INP (Indianapolis)	RSM (San Marino)	ARA (Aragon)	JPN (Japan)	MAL (Malaysia)	AUS (Australia)	POR (Portugal)	VAL (Valencian Community)	Pts

Colour	Result
Gold	Winner
Silver	Second place
Bronze	Third place
Green	Points classification
Blue	Non-points classification
Blue	Non-classified finish (NC)
Purple	Retired, not classified (Ret)
Red	Did not qualify (DNQ)
Red	Did not pre-qualify (DNPQ)
Black	Disqualified (DSQ)
White	Did not start (DNS)
White	Withdrew (WD)
White	Race cancelled (C)
Blank	Did not practice (DNP)
Blank	Did not arrive (DNA)
Blank	Excluded (EX)

**Bold** – Pole
Italics – Fastest Lap

- † – Shoya Tomizawa was fatally injured in an accident during the San Marino Grand Prix.

==== Constructors' standings ====
- Each constructor got the same number of points as their best placed rider in each race.
- Rounds marked with a light blue background were under wet race conditions or stopped by rain.

Pos	Constructor	QAT (Qatar)	SPA (Spain)	FRA (France)	ITA (Italy)	GBR (United Kingdom)	NED (Netherlands)	CAT (Catalonia)	GER (Germany)	CZE (Czech Republic)	INP (Indianapolis)	RSM (San Marino)	ARA (Aragon)	JPN (Japan)	MAL (Malaysia)	AUS (Australia)	POR (Portugal)	VAL (Valencian Community)	Pts
1	(Switzerland) Suter	1	2	2	6	1	5	3	3	4	2	2	2	2	1	2	1	3	322
2	(Japan) Moriwaki	4	1	1	4	2	2	2	1	1	1	1	4	1	4	7	16	4	309
3	(Italy) Speed Up	9	9	4	1	12	1	11	2	3	4	7	1	13	3	3	8	2	232
4	(Italy) Motobi	6	5	3	3	Ret	12	6	19	8	5	4	5	4	2	1	3	6	194
5	(United Kingdom) FTR	2	25	16	10	5	9	4	5	7	9	21	18	3	5	9	10	1	149
6	(France) Tech 3	Ret	4	Ret	8	18	10	1	Ret	2	26	13	12	6	Ret	16	6	18	99
7	(Spain) Pons Kalex	10	6	6	2	15	23	25	7	14	6	18	20	17	17	14	13	8	81
8	(Italy) I.C.P.	12	32	14	13	Ret	16	Ret	11	17	16	Ret	Ret	Ret	12	20	2	17	38
9	(Spain) BQR-Moto2	25	10	12	20	Ret	15	12	10	23	15	11	Ret	28	13	19	18	14	32
10	(Italy) Bimota	17	17	7	29	13	4	Ret	17	21	Ret	12	15	24	16	22	Ret	22	30
11	(Germany) MZ-RE Honda	Ret	15	26	27	17	Ret	9	13	18	10	17	21	23	24	21	7	27	26
12	(United Kingdom) Promoharris	18	7	24	26	21	22	7	21	31	19	24	28	22	18	31	Ret	12	22
13	(Italy) Force GP210	27	Ret	17	11	16	20	10	20										11
14	(Italy) RSV	14	8																10
	(Monaco) ADV	24	31	22	23	26	30	20	16	32	18	22	27	26	20	28	Ret	Ret	0
	(Spain) MIR Racing												16					23	0
	(Spain) AJR		30															16	0
	(Germany) Kalex								23										0
	(Japan) RBB													34					0
	(Japan) TSR													Ret					0
Pos	Constructor	QAT (Qatar)	SPA (Spain)	FRA (France)	ITA (Italy)	GBR (United Kingdom)	NED (Netherlands)	CAT (Catalonia)	GER (Germany)	CZE (Czech Republic)	INP (Indianapolis)	RSM (San Marino)	ARA (Aragon)	JPN (Japan)	MAL (Malaysia)	AUS (Australia)	POR (Portugal)	VAL (Valencian Community)	Pts

=== 125cc standings ===
Scoring system

Points were awarded to the top fifteen finishers. Rider had to finish the race to earn points.

Position	**1st**	**2nd**	**3rd**	**4th**	**5th**	**6th**	**7th**	**8th**	**9th**	**10th**	**11th**	**12th**	**13th**	**14th**	**15th**
Points	25	20	16	13	11	10	9	8	7	6	5	4	3	2	1

==== Riders' standings ====
- Rounds marked with a light blue background were under wet race conditions or stopped by rain.
- Riders marked with light blue background were eligible for Rookie of the Year awards.

Pos	Rider	Bike	QAT (Qatar)	SPA (Spain)	FRA (France)	ITA (Italy)	GBR (United Kingdom)	NED (Netherlands)	CAT (Catalonia)	GER (Germany)	CZE (Czech Republic)	INP (Indianapolis)	RSM (San Marino)	ARA (Aragon)	JPN (Japan)	MAL (Malaysia)	AUS (Australia)	POR (Portugal)	VAL (Valencian Community)	Pts
1	(Spain) Marc Márquez	Derbi	**3**	**Ret**	3	1	**1**	**1**	**1**	**1**	7	**10**	1	**Ret**	**1**	**1**	**1**	1	**4**	310
2	(Spain) Nicolás Terol	Aprilia	1	2	**2**	2	4	2	Ret		1	1	2	2	2	3	3	2	3	296
3	(Spain) Pol Espargaró	Derbi	4	1	1	3	2	3	3	Ret	2	3	6	1	4	2	2	10	2	281
4	(United Kingdom) Bradley Smith	Aprilia	8	4	5	4	3	4	2	5	**6**	Ret	**4**	3	3	5	5	**3**	1	223
5	(Spain) Efrén Vázquez	Derbi	2	Ret	4	5	11	Ret	5	8	Ret	4	3	4	Ret	4	4	8	8	152
6	(Spain) Esteve Rabat	Aprilia	7	3	7	7	9	Ret	Ret	4	3	5	7	7	6	7	6	Ret	6	147
7	(Germany) Sandro Cortese	Derbi	5	11	6	**Ret**	6	5	4	3	16	2	5	5	12	6	Ret	Ret	5	143
8	(Japan) Tomoyoshi Koyama	Aprilia	9	5	8	8	5	14	6	2	9	Ret	8	6	22	9	7	Ret	7	127
9	(Switzerland) Randy Krummenacher	Aprilia	6	8	14	6	7	6	7	11	17	7	9	DSQ	11	10	9	7	9	113
10	(United Kingdom) Danny Webb	Aprilia	11	Ret	9	10	10	7	10	7	Ret	6	10	9	7	Ret	10	9	16	93
11	(France) Johann Zarco	Aprilia	12	7	11	9	8	12	8	6	19	13	12	12	10	11	Ret	Ret	Ret	77
12	(Spain) Luis Salom	Lambretta	Ret	15																72
12	(Spain) Luis Salom	Aprilia			10	DNS	Ret	8	Ret	Ret	10	12	Ret	10	8	8	8	5	10	72
13	(Spain) Alberto Moncayo	Aprilia	13	6	17	Ret	12	11	13	Ret	12	8	13	17	5	12	Ret	6	11	70
14	(Germany) Jonas Folger	Aprilia	15	Ret	13	11	15	10	9	16	4	9	11	8	Ret	DNS		4	Ret	69
15	(Spain) Adrián Martín	Aprilia	20	13	15	DNQ	16	16	11	Ret	11	Ret	15	11	9	13	11	Ret	Ret	35
16	(Netherlands) Jasper Iwema	Aprilia	14	10	12	14	13	13	Ret	Ret	8	11	21	Ret	15	Ret	16	Ret		34
17	(Czech Republic) Jakub Kornfeil	Aprilia	19	14	19	17	20	15	16	17	5	14	16	14	Ret	14	14	11	15	28
18	(Germany) Marcel Schrötter	Honda	16	12	18	13	17	18	14	14	13	Ret	17	13	14	15	13	Ret	12	27
19	(Italy) Simone Grotzkyj	Aprilia				15	14	9	12	Ret	Ret	17	14	Ret	13	Ret	15	12	14	26
20	(France) Alexis Masbou	Aprilia	10	9	16	12	Ret	Ret	Ret	13	Ret	DNS	Ret							20
21	(Norway) Sturla Fagerhaug	Aprilia	18	Ret	20	Ret	18	17	Ret	9	20		Ret	15	Ret	Ret	12	Ret	Ret	12
22	(Germany) Daniel Kartheininger	KTM								10										6
23	(Italy) Lorenzo Savadori	Aprilia	Ret	Ret	Ret	Ret	21	Ret	DNS	12	Ret	15	Ret		Ret	Ret	Ret	DNS	19	5
24	(Malaysia) Zulfahmi Khairuddin	Aprilia	21	20	25	21	Ret	22	15	15	15	Ret	Ret	16	19	16	DNQ	15	20	4
25	(Spain) Isaac Viñales	Aprilia		16					Ret										13	3
25	(Spain) Isaac Viñales	Lambretta									22	Ret		DNS						3
26	(Italy) Alessandro Tonucci	Aprilia				18					18		20					13		3
27	(Italy) Luigi Morciano	Aprilia				Ret					Ret							14		2
28	(France) Louis Rossi	Aprilia	17	Ret	21	Ret	19	19	17	Ret	14	Ret	19	Ret	18	17	17	Ret	Ret	2
	(Italy) Marco Ravaioli	Lambretta	Ret	22	Ret	Ret	Ret	Ret	22	Ret	21	16	23	18	DNS	18	DNQ	DNQ	Ret	0
	(Italy) Riccardo Moretti	Aprilia		Ret	Ret	16														0
	(Japan) Hikari Okubo	Honda													16					0
	(Italy) Luca Marconi	Aprilia	22	17		Ret	23	Ret	18	Ret	23	18	Ret		23	Ret	19	Ret		0
	(Hungary) Péter Sebestyén	Aprilia							23					Ret					17	0
	(Japan) Takehiro Yamamoto	Honda													17					0
	(Spain) Joan Perelló	Honda		18					19					19					18	0
	(Spain) Joan Perelló	Lambretta											25							0
	(Italy) Armando Pontone	Aprilia				20							18							0
	(Germany) Kevin Hanus	Honda								18				Ret						0
	(Australia) Joshua Hook	Aprilia															18			0
	(Spain) Johnny Rosell	Honda		19					21										Ret	0
	(Italy) Tommaso Gabrielli	Aprilia				Ret							22		Ret	19	DNQ	DNQ	Ret	0
	(Italy) Mattia Tarozzi	Aprilia				19														0
	(Netherlands) Michael van der Mark	Aprilia		Ret																0
	(Netherlands) Michael van der Mark	Lambretta			22	22	22	21	20	Ret										0
	(Germany) Toni Finsterbusch	KTM						20		Ret										0
	(France) Robin Barbosa	Aprilia												20				Ret		0
	(Japan) Syunya Mori	Honda													20					0
	(Australia) Joel Taylor	Aprilia															20			0
	(France) Quentin Jacquet	Aprilia	23	21																0
	(United Kingdom) Danny Kent	Honda					Ret													0
	(United Kingdom) Danny Kent	Lambretta													Ret	Ret	21	Ret	Ret	0
	(United Kingdom) Taylor Mackenzie	Honda					Ret												21	0
	(Italy) Alejandro Pardo	Aprilia												21						0
	(Japan) Sasuke Shinozaki	Yamaha													21					0
	(Spain) Josep Rodríguez	Aprilia												22						0
	(United Kingdom) John McPhee	Honda																	22	0
	(France) Kevin Szalai	Honda			23															0
	(Netherlands) Pepijn Bijsterbosch	Honda						23												0
	(France) Grégory Di Carlo	Honda			24															0
	(United Kingdom) Deane Brown	Honda					24													0
	(Netherlands) Ernst Dubbink	Honda						24												0
	(Italy) Francesco Mauriello	Aprilia											24							0
	(Japan) Yuma Yahagi	Honda													24					0
	(France) Morgan Berchet	Honda			26															0
	(United Kingdom) James Lodge	Honda					Ret													0
	(Netherlands) Jerry van de Bunt	Honda						Ret												0
	(Netherlands) Roy Pouw	Aprilia						Ret												0
	(Spain) Eduard López	Aprilia							Ret											0
	(Germany) Marvin Fritz	Honda								Ret										0
	(Germany) Eric Hübsch	Aprilia								Ret										0
	(Czech Republic) Ladislav Chmelík	Honda									Ret									0
	(Italy) Giovanni Bonati	Aprilia											Ret							0
	(Spain) Pedro Rodriguez	Aprilia												Ret						0
	(Finland) Niklas Ajo	Derbi																	Ret	0
	(Republic of Ireland) Andrew Reid	Honda					DNQ													0
	(Czech Republic) Andrea Toušková	Honda									DNQ									0
	(United States) Kristian Lee Turner	Aprilia										DNQ								0
	(Australia) Levi Day	Honda															DNQ			0
	(Australia) Nicky Diles	Aprilia															DNQ			0
	(Australia) Jordan Zamora	Honda															DNQ			0
Pos	Rider	Bike	QAT (Qatar)	SPA (Spain)	FRA (France)	ITA (Italy)	GBR (United Kingdom)	NED (Netherlands)	CAT (Catalonia)	GER (Germany)	CZE (Czech Republic)	INP (Indianapolis)	RSM (San Marino)	ARA (Aragon)	JPN (Japan)	MAL (Malaysia)	AUS (Australia)	POR (Portugal)	VAL (Valencian Community)	Pts

Colour	Result
Gold	Winner
Silver	Second place
Bronze	Third place
Green	Points classification
Blue	Non-points classification
Blue	Non-classified finish (NC)
Purple	Retired, not classified (Ret)
Red	Did not qualify (DNQ)
Red	Did not pre-qualify (DNPQ)
Black	Disqualified (DSQ)
White	Did not start (DNS)
White	Withdrew (WD)
White	Race cancelled (C)
Blank	Did not practice (DNP)
Blank	Did not arrive (DNA)
Blank	Excluded (EX)

**Bold** – Pole
Italics – Fastest Lap

==== Constructors' standings ====
- Each constructor got the same number of points as their best placed rider in each race.
- Rounds marked with a light blue background were under wet race conditions or stopped by rain.

Pos	Constructor	QAT (Qatar)	SPA (Spain)	FRA (France)	ITA (Italy)	GBR (United Kingdom)	NED (Netherlands)	CAT (Catalonia)	GER (Germany)	CZE (Czech Republic)	INP (Indianapolis)	RSM (San Marino)	ARA (Aragon)	JPN (Japan)	MAL (Malaysia)	AUS (Australia)	POR (Portugal)	VAL (Valencian Community)	Pts
1	(Spain) Derbi	2	1	1	1	1	1	1	1	2	2	1	1	1	1	1	1	2	405
2	(Italy) Aprilia	1	2	2	2	3	2	2	2	1	1	2	2	2	3	3	2	1	348
3	(Japan) Honda	16	12	18	13	17	18	14	14	13	Ret	17	13	14	15	13	Ret	12	27
4	(Austria) KTM						20		10										6
5	(Italy) Lambretta	Ret	15	22	22	22	21	20	Ret	21	16	23	18	Ret	18	21	Ret	Ret	1
	(Japan) Yamaha													21					0
Pos	Constructor	QAT (Qatar)	SPA (Spain)	FRA (France)	ITA (Italy)	GBR (United Kingdom)	NED (Netherlands)	CAT (Catalonia)	GER (Germany)	CZE (Czech Republic)	INP (Indianapolis)	RSM (San Marino)	ARA (Aragon)	JPN (Japan)	MAL (Malaysia)	AUS (Australia)	POR (Portugal)	VAL (Valencian Community)	Pts
