= 2010 United States motorcycle Grand Prix =

9th round of the 2010 FIM Road Racing World Championship season

2010 United States Grand Prix
Race details
- Race 9 of 18 races in the 2010 Grand Prix motorcycle racing season
- Date: July 25, 2010
- Official name: Red Bull U.S. Grand Prix
- Location: Mazda Raceway Laguna Seca
- Course: Permanent racing facility; 3.610 km (2.243 mi)

MotoGP
Pole position
- Rider: (Spain) Jorge Lorenzo
- Time: 1:20.978
Fastest lap
- Rider: (Australia) Casey Stoner
- Time: 1:21.376
Podium
- First: (Spain) Jorge Lorenzo
- Second: (Australia) Casey Stoner
- Third: (Italy) Valentino Rossi

The 2010 United States motorcycle Grand Prix was the ninth round of the 2010 Grand Prix motorcycle racing season. It took place on the weekend of July 23–25, 2010 at Mazda Raceway Laguna Seca. Only the MotoGP class raced at Laguna Seca.

== MotoGP classification ==
Pos.	No.	Rider	Team	Manufacturer	Laps	Time/Retired	Grid	Points
1	99	(Spain) Jorge Lorenzo	Fiat Yamaha Team	Yamaha	32	43:54.873	1	25
2	27	(Australia) Casey Stoner	Ducati Team	Ducati	32	+3.517	2	20
3	46	(Italy) Valentino Rossi	Fiat Yamaha Team	Yamaha	32	+13.420	6	16
4	4	(Italy) Andrea Dovizioso	Repsol Honda Team	Honda	32	+14.188	3	13
5	69	(United States) Nicky Hayden	Ducati Team	Ducati	32	+14.601	7	11
6	11	(United States) Ben Spies	Monster Yamaha Tech 3	Yamaha	32	+19.037	5	10
7	5	(United States) Colin Edwards	Monster Yamaha Tech 3	Yamaha	32	+40.721	8	9
8	33	(Italy) Marco Melandri	San Carlo Honda Gresini	Honda	32	+47.219	11	8
9	36	(Finland) Mika Kallio	Pramac Racing Team	Ducati	32	+52.813	15	7
10	65	(Italy) Loris Capirossi	Rizla Suzuki MotoGP	Suzuki	32	+52.814	12	6
11	95	(United States) Roger Lee Hayden	LCR Honda MotoGP	Honda	32	+1:14.089	17	5
12	15	(San Marino) Alex de Angelis	Interwetten Honda MotoGP	Honda	32	+1:14.666	16	4
Ret	41	(Spain) Aleix Espargaró	Pramac Racing Team	Ducati	28	Accident	13	
Ret	58	(Italy) Marco Simoncelli	San Carlo Honda Gresini	Honda	18	Accident	9	
Ret	26	(Spain) Dani Pedrosa	Repsol Honda Team	Honda	11	Accident	4	
Ret	40	(Spain) Héctor Barberá	Páginas Amarillas Aspar	Ducati	3	Retirement	10	
Ret	19	(Spain) Álvaro Bautista	Rizla Suzuki MotoGP	Suzuki	2	Accident	14	

== Championship standings after the race (MotoGP) ==
Below are the standings for the top five riders and constructors after round nine has concluded.

Riders' Championship standings

Pos.	Rider	Points
1	(Spain) Jorge Lorenzo	210
2	(Spain) Dani Pedrosa	138
3	(Italy) Andrea Dovizioso	115
4	(Australia) Casey Stoner	103
5	(Italy) Valentino Rossi	90

Constructors' Championship standings

Pos.	Constructor	Points
1	(Japan) Yamaha	215
2	(Japan) Honda	175
3	(Italy) Ducati	133
4	(Japan) Suzuki	48

- Note: Only the top five positions are included for both sets of standings.

Previous race: 2010 German Grand Prix	FIM Grand Prix World Championship; 2010 season	Next race: 2010 Czech Republic Grand Prix
Previous race: 2009 United States Grand Prix	United States motorcycle Grand Prix	Next race: 2011 United States Grand Prix
