= Yusuke Teshima =

Japanese motorcycle racer

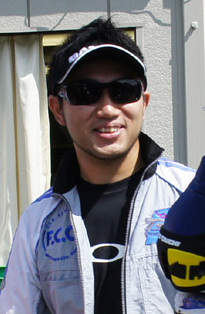
- Teshima at the 2010 Japanese Grand Prix
- Nationality: Japanese
- Born: January 26, 1983 (age 43); Saitama, Japan
Motorcycle racing career statistics
Moto2 World Championship
Active years	2010
Manufacturers	Motobi-Honda, TSR-Honda
Championships	0
2010 championship position	39th (1 pt)
Starts / Wins / Podiums / Poles / F. laps / Points; 5 / 0 / 0 / 0 / 0 / 1

Yusuke Teshima is a former Japanese motorcycle rider. In 2009 he won the Superstock 600 class in the All Japan Road Race Championship. He retired after the 2012 season and set up his own team CLUB PLUSONE with T.Pro Innovation, running Tomoyoshi Koyama and Satoru Iwata on Honda CBR600RRs.

== Career statistics ==
=== By Seasons ===
Season	Class	Motorcycle	Type	Team	Number	Races	Win	Podiums	Pole	Pts	Position
2010	Moto2	Motobi	TSR TSR6	JIR Moto2	11	5	0	0	0	1	39th
2010	Moto2	TSR	TSR TSR6	FCC TSR	11	5	0	0	0	1	39th
Total						**5**	**0**	**0**	**0**	**1**	

=== By class ===
Class	Seas	1st GP	1st Pod	1st Win	Race	Win	Podiums	Pole	FLap	Pts	WChmp
Moto2	2010	(Catalonia) 2010 Catalan			5	0	0	0	0	1	0
Total	2010				**5**	**0**	**0**	**0**	**0**	**1**	**0**

=== Races by year ===
(key) (Races in bold indicate pole position)

Year	Class	Bike	1	2	3	4	5	6	7	8	9	10	11	12	13	14	15	16	17	Pos	Pts
2010	Moto2	Motobi	QAT	SPA	FRA	ITA	GBR	NED	CAT; 15	GER; 19	CZE; Ret	INP; Ret	SMR	ARA						39th	1
2010	Moto2	TSR													JPN; Ret	MAL	AUS	POR	VAL	39th	1
