= Shogo Moriwaki =

Japanese motorcycle racer

- Nationality: Japanese
- Born: Japan
Motorcycle racing career statistics
Moto2 World Championship
Active years	2010
Manufacturers	Moriwaki
Championships	0
2010 championship position	NC (0 pts)
Starts / Wins / Podiums / Poles / F. laps / Points; 0 / 0 / 0 / 0 / 0 / 0

Shogo Moriwaki (森脇 尚護, Moriwaki Shōgo) is a Japanese professional motorcycle racer.

== Motorcycle racing career ==
In 2010, Moriwaki participated for the first time in a Moto2 World Championship event, as a wild-card rider in the Japanese Grand Prix but, was unable to start the race. Moriwaki's parents are Mamoru Moriwaki, the founder of Moriwaki Engineering and Namiko Yoshimura, the eldest daughter of famed motorcycle tuner Pops Yoshimura. Moriwaki is involved with his sister Midori in running Moriwaki Engineering.

== Career statistics ==
=== Grand Prix motorcycle racing ===
==== By season ====
Season	Class	Motorcycle	Team	Number	Race	Win	Podium	Pole	FLap	Pts	Plcd
2010	Moto2	Moriwaki	Moriwaki Racing	83	0	0	0	0	0	0	NC
Total					0	0	0	0	0	0	

==== Races by year ====
Year	Class	Bike	1	2	3	4	5	6	7	8	9	10	11	12	13	14	15	16	17	Pos.	Points
2010	Moto2	Moriwaki	QAT	SPA	FRA	ITA	GBR	NED	CAT	GER	CZE	INP	RSM	ARA	JPN; DNS	MAL	AUS	POR	VAL	NC	0
