= Jordan Zamora =

Australian motorcycle racer

- Nationality: Australian
- Born: Queensland, Australia
Motorcycle racing career statistics
125cc World Championship
Active years	2010
Manufacturers	Honda
Starts / Wins / Podiums / Poles / F. laps / Points; 0 / 0 / 0 / 0 / 0 / 0

Jordan Zamora is an Australian motorcycle racer. In 2010, he participated for the first time in a 125cc World Championship event, as a wild-card rider in the Australian round at Phillip Island, but failed to qualify for the race.

== Grand Prix motorcycle racing ==
=== By season ===
Season	Class	Motorcycle	Team	Number	Race	Win	Podium	Pole	FLap	Pts	Plcd
2010	125cc	Honda	Eurotwins Brisbane	45	0	0	0	0	0	0	
Total					**0**	**0**	**0**	**0**	**0**	**0**	

=== Races by year ===
(key) (Races in bold indicate pole position)

Yr	Class	Bike	1	2	3	4	5	6	7	8	9	10	11	12	13	14	15	16	17	Pos	Pts
2010	125cc	Honda	QAT	SPA	FRA	ITA	GBR	NED	CAT	GER	CZE	INP	RSM	ARA	JPN	MAL	AUS; DNQ	POR	VAL	NC	0
