= Eric Hübsch =

German motorcycle racer

- Nationality: German
- Born: 8 May 1990 (age 36); Lichtenstein, Germany

Eric Hübsch (born 8 May 1990) is a Grand Prix motorcycle racer from Germany.

== Career statistics ==
=== By season ===
Season	Class	Motorcycle	Team	Number	Race	Win	Podium	Pole	FLap	Pts	Plcd
2006	250cc	Aprilia	Sachsenring Motorrad Unger	72	1	0	0	0	0	0	NC
2007	125cc	Aprilia	Sachsenring Motorrad Unger	65	1	0	0	0	0	0	NC
2008	125cc	Aprilia	Team Sachsenring	86	1	0	0	0	0	0	NC
2010	125cc	Aprilia	Team Sachsenring	85	1	0	0	0	0	0	NC
Total					4	0	0	0	0	0	

=== Races by year ===
(key)

Year	Class	Bike	1	2	3	4	5	6	7	8	9	10	11	12	13	14	15	16	17	Pos	Pts
2006	125cc	Aprilia	SPA	QAT	TUR	CHN	FRA	ITA	CAT	NED	GBR	GER; Ret	CZE	MAL	AUS	JPN	POR	VAL		NC	0
2007	125cc	Aprilia	QAT	SPA	TUR	CHN	FRA	ITA	CAT	GBR	NED	GER; 26	CZE	RSM	POR	JPN	AUS	MAL	VAL	NC	0
2008	125cc	Aprilia	QAT	SPA	POR	CHN	FRA	ITA	CAT	GBR	NED	GER; Ret	CZE	RSM	INP	JPN	AUS	MAL	VAL	NC	0
2010	125cc	Aprilia	QAT	SPA<	FRA	ITA	GBR	NED	CAT	GER; Ret	CZE	INP	RSM	ARA	JPN	MAL	AUS	POR	VAL	NC	0
