= Eduard López =

Spanish motorcycle racer

- Nationality: Spanish
- Born: 26 December 1992 (age 33); Barcelona, Spain

Eduard López López is a Grand Prix motorcycle racer from Spain.

== Career statistics ==
=== By season ===
Season	Class	Motorcycle	Team	Number	Race	Win	Podium	Pole	FLap	Pts	Plcd
2009	125cc	Aprilia	TCR Competicion	40	1	0	0	0	0	0	NC
2010	125cc	Aprilia	Catalunya Racing Team	17	1	0	0	0	0	0	NC
Total					2	0	0	0	0	0	

==== Races by year ====
(key)

Year	Class	Bike	1	2	3	4	5	6	7	8	9	10	11	12	13	14	15	16	17	Pos.	Pts
2009	125cc	Aprilia	QAT	JPN	SPA; 28	FRA	ITA	CAT	NED	GER	GBR	CZE	INP	RSM	POR	AUS	MAL	VAL		NC	0
2010	125cc	Aprilia	QAT	SPA	FRA	ITA	GBR	NED	CAT; Ret	GER	CZE	INP	RSM	ARA	JPN	MAL	AUS	POR	VAL	NC	0
