= Josep Rodríguez =

Spanish motorcycle racer

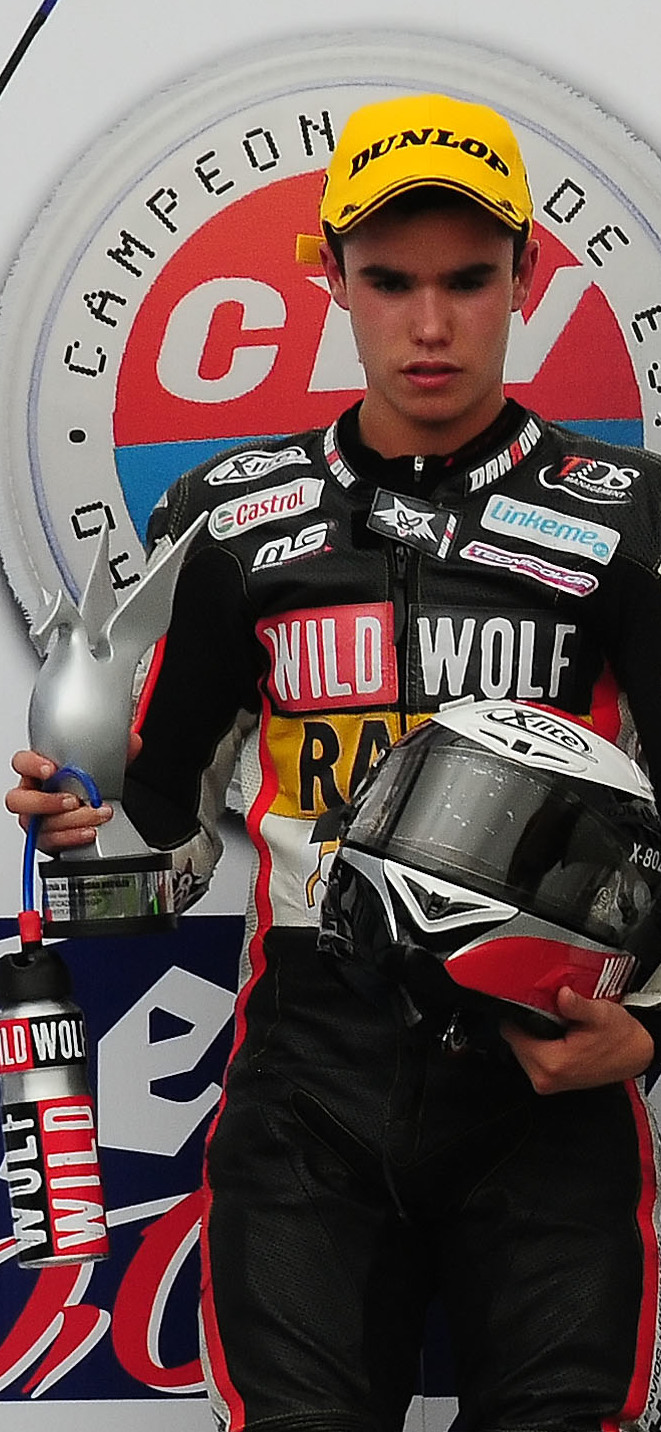
- Rodríguez in 2011
- Nationality: Spanish
- Born: 28 November 1993 (age 32); Manresa, Spain
Motorcycle racing career statistics
Moto3 World Championship
Active years	2012
Manufacturers	FTR Honda, FGR Honda
Championships	0
2012 championship position	36th (1 pt)
Starts / Wins / Podiums / Poles / F. laps / Points; 5 / 0 / 0 / 0 / 0 / 1
125cc World Championship
Active years	2010–2011
Manufacturers	Aprilia
Championships	0
2011 championship position	32nd (3 pts)
Starts / Wins / Podiums / Poles / F. laps / Points; 9 / 0 / 0 / 0 / 0 / 3

Josep Rodríguez Ruiz (born 28 November 1993) is a Spanish motorcycle racer. He has competed in the CEV Moto3 championship and the CEV 125GP championship.

== Career statistics ==
=== CEV Moto3 Championship ===
==== Races by year ====
(key) (Races in bold indicate pole position, races in italics indicate fastest lap)

Year	Bike	1	2	3	4	5	6	7	Pos	Pts
2012	FTR Honda	JER; 4	NAV; Ret	ARA; 6	CAT; 14	ALB1; Ret	ALB2; 11	VAL; 5	9th	41

=== Grand Prix motorcycle racing ===
==== By season ====
Season	Class	Motorcycle	Team	Number	Race	Win	Podium	Pole	FLap	Pts	Plcd
2010	125cc	Aprilia	Hune Racing	28	1	0	0	0	0	0	NC
2011	125cc	Aprilia	Wild Wolf-Racc-MS	28	6	0	0	0	0	3	32nd
2011	125cc	Aprilia	Blusens by Paris Hilton Racing	28	6	0	0	0	0	3	32nd
2012	Moto3	FTR Honda	Wild Wolf BST	28	5	0	0	0	0	1	36th
2012	Moto3	FTR Honda	Ongetta-Centro Seta	28	5	0	0	0	0	1	36th
2012	Moto3	FGR Honda	Moto FGR	28	5	0	0	0	0	1	36th
Total					**14**	**0**	**0**	**0**	**0**	**4**	

==== Races by year ====
(key)

Year	Class	Bike	1	2	3	4	5	6	7	8	9	10	11	12	13	14	15	16	17	Pos.	Pts
2010	125cc	Aprilia	QAT	SPA	FRA	ITA	GBR	NED	CAT	GER	CZE	INP	RSM	ARA; 22	JPN	MAL	AUS	POR	VAL	NC	0
2011	125cc	Aprilia	QAT	SPA; 15	POR	FRA	CAT; 23	GBR	NED; 21	ITA	GER	CZE	INP	RSM	ARA; Ret	JPN; Ret	AUS; 17	MAL; 14	VAL; Ret	32nd	3
2012	Moto3	FTR Honda	QAT	SPA; Ret	POR	FRA	CAT	GBR	NED	GER	ITA	INP	CZE	RSM; 23	ARA					36th	1
2012	Moto3	FGR Honda														JPN; 24	MAL; 25	AUS; DNS	VAL; 15	36th	1
