= Robin Barbosa =

French motorcycle racer

- Nationality: French
- Born: 3 September 1993 (age 33); Drancy, France

Robin Barbosa is a Grand Prix motorcycle racer from France.

== Career statistics ==
=== Red Bull MotoGP Rookies Cup ===
==== Races by year ====
(key) (Races in bold indicate pole position, races in italics indicate fastest lap)

Year	1	2	3	4	5	6	7	8	Pos	Pts
2009	SPA1; Ret	SPA2; 13	ITA; 11	NED; 19	GER; 18	GBR; Ret	CZE1; Ret	CZE2; 22	23rd	8

=== Grand Prix motorcycle racing ===
==== By season ====
Season	Class	Motorcycle	Team	Number	Race	Win	Podium	Pole	FLap	Pts	Plcd
2010	125cc	Aprilia	Ongetta Team	37	2	0	0	0	0	0	NC
2010	125cc	Aprilia	H43/Hernandez Racing	37	2	0	0	0	0	0	NC
Total					**2**	**0**	**0**	**0**	**0**	**0**	

==== Races by year ====
(key)

Year	Class	Bike	1	2	3	4	5	6	7	8	9	10	11	12	13	14	15	16	17	Pos.	Pts
2010	125cc	Aprilia	QAT	SPA	FRA	ITA	GBR	NED	CAT	GER	CZE	INP	RSM	ARA; 20	JPN	MAL	AUS	POR; Ret	VAL	NC	0
