= Mattia Tarozzi =

Italian motorcycle racer (born 1991)

- Nationality: Italian
- Born: 15 January 1991 (age 35); Faenza, Italy
Motorcycle racing career statistics
Moto2 World Championship
Active years	2011
Manufacturers	Suter
Championships	0
2011 championship position	NC (0 pts)
Starts / Wins / Podiums / Poles / F. laps / Points; 1 / 0 / 0 / 0 / 0 / 0
125cc World Championship
Active years	2010
Manufacturers	Aprilia
Championships	0
2010 championship position	NC (0 pts)
Starts / Wins / Podiums / Poles / F. laps / Points; 1 / 0 / 0 / 0 / 0 / 0

Mattia Tarozzi (born January 15, 1991) is an Italian former Grand Prix motorcycle racer.

Tarozzi debuted in Moto2 in 2010. He retired in 2012 due to injuries and returned to his native Faenza to work on his family farm.

== Career statistics ==
=== By season ===
Season	Class	Motorcycle	Team	Number	Race	Win	Podium	Pole	FLap	Pts	Plcd
2010	125cc	Aprilia	Faenza Racing	98	1	0	0	0	0	0	NC
2011	Moto2	Suter	Faenza Racing	70	1	0	0	0	0	0	NC
Total					2	0	0	0	0	0	

=== Races by year ===
Year	Class	Bike	1	2	3	4	5	6	7	8	9	10	11	12	13	14	15	16	17	Pos	Points
2010	125cc	Aprilia	QAT	SPA	FRA	ITA; 19	GBR	NED	CAT	GER	CZE	INP	RSM	ARA	JPN	MAL	AUS	POR	VAL	NC	0
2011	Moto2	Suter	QAT	SPA	POR	FRA	CAT	GBR	NED	ITA; Ret	GER	CZE	INP	RSM	ARA	JPN	AUS	MAL	VAL	NC	0
