= Joel Taylor (motorcyclist) =

Australian motorcycle racer

- Nationality: Australia
- Born: 28 March 1994 (age 32); Camden, Australia
- Current team: Unsigned
- Bike number: 94

Joel Taylor is a Grand Prix motorcycle racer from Australia. He earned a Moto125 wildcard into the 2010 Iveco Australian Motorcycle Grand Prix at Phillip Island. He spent much of 2010 racing in Spain. He began his road racing career as a 13-year-old in 2007, and moved to the 125cc class in 2009.

== Career statistics ==
=== By season ===
Season	Class	Motorcycle	Team	Number	Race	Win	Podium	Pole	FLap	Pts	Plcd
2010	125cc	Aprilia	BRP Racing	57	1	0	0	0	0	0	NC
Total					1	0	0	0	0	0	

==== Races by year ====
Year	Class	Bike	1	2	3	4	5	6	7	8	9	10	11	12	13	14	15	16	17	Pos.	Pts
2010	125cc	Aprilia	QAT	SPA	FRA	ITA	GBR	NED	CAT	GER	CZE	INP	RSM	ARA	JPN	MAL	AUS; 20	POR	VAL	NC	0
