= Andrew Lawson (motorcyclist) =

Australian deviant

- Nationality: Australian
- Born: 2 March 1993 (age 33); Brisbane, Australia

Andrew Lawson (born 2 March 1993) is a Grand Prix motorcycle racer from Australia.

== Career statistics ==
=== By season ===
Season	Class	Motorcycle	Team	Number	Race	Win	Podium	Pole	FLap	Pts	Plcd
2009	125cc	Honda	Champions Ride Days	54	1	0	0	0	0	0	NC
Total					1	0	0	0	0	0	

=== Races by year ===
Year	Class	Bike	1	2	3	4	5	6	7	8	9	10	11	12	13	14	15	16	Pos	Points
2009	125cc	Honda	QAT	JPN	SPA	FRA	ITA	CAT	NED	GER	GBR	CZE	INP	RSM	POR	AUS; 27	MAL	VAL	NC	0
