= Dylan Mavin =

Australian motorcycle racer

- Nationality: Australian
- Born: Jimboomba, Queensland, Australia
Motorcycle racing career statistics
125cc World Championship
Active years	2009
Manufacturers	Honda
Starts / Wins / Podiums / Poles / F. laps / Points; 0 / 0 / 0 / 0 / 0 / 0

Dylan Mavin is an Australian motorcycle racer. In 2008 and 2009 he was a competitor in the Red Bull MotoGP Rookies Cup racing series.

== Career statistics ==
=== Red Bull MotoGP Rookies Cup ===
==== Races by year ====
(key) (Races in bold indicate pole position, races in italics indicate fastest lap)

Year	1	2	3	4	5	6	7	8	9	10	Pos	Pts
2008	SPA1; Ret	SPA2; DNS	POR	FRA; Ret	ITA; 14	GBR; Ret	NED; 11	GER; 16	CZE1; 20	CZE2; 16	23rd	7

=== Grand Prix motorcycle racing ===
==== By season ====
Season	Class	Motorcycle	Team	Number	Race	Win	Podium	Pole	FLap	Pts	Plcd
2009	125cc	Honda	Mavin Industries	30	0	0	0	0	0	0	
Total					**0**	**0**	**0**	**0**	**0**	**0**	

==== Races by year ====
Year	Class	Bike	1	2	3	4	5	6	7	8	9	10	11	12	13	14	15	16	Pos	Points
2009	125cc	Honda	QAT	JPN	SPA	FRA	ITA	CAT	NED	GER	GBR	CZE	INP	RSM	POR	AUS; DNS	MAL	VAL	NC	0
