= Daniel Kartheininger =

German motorcycle racer

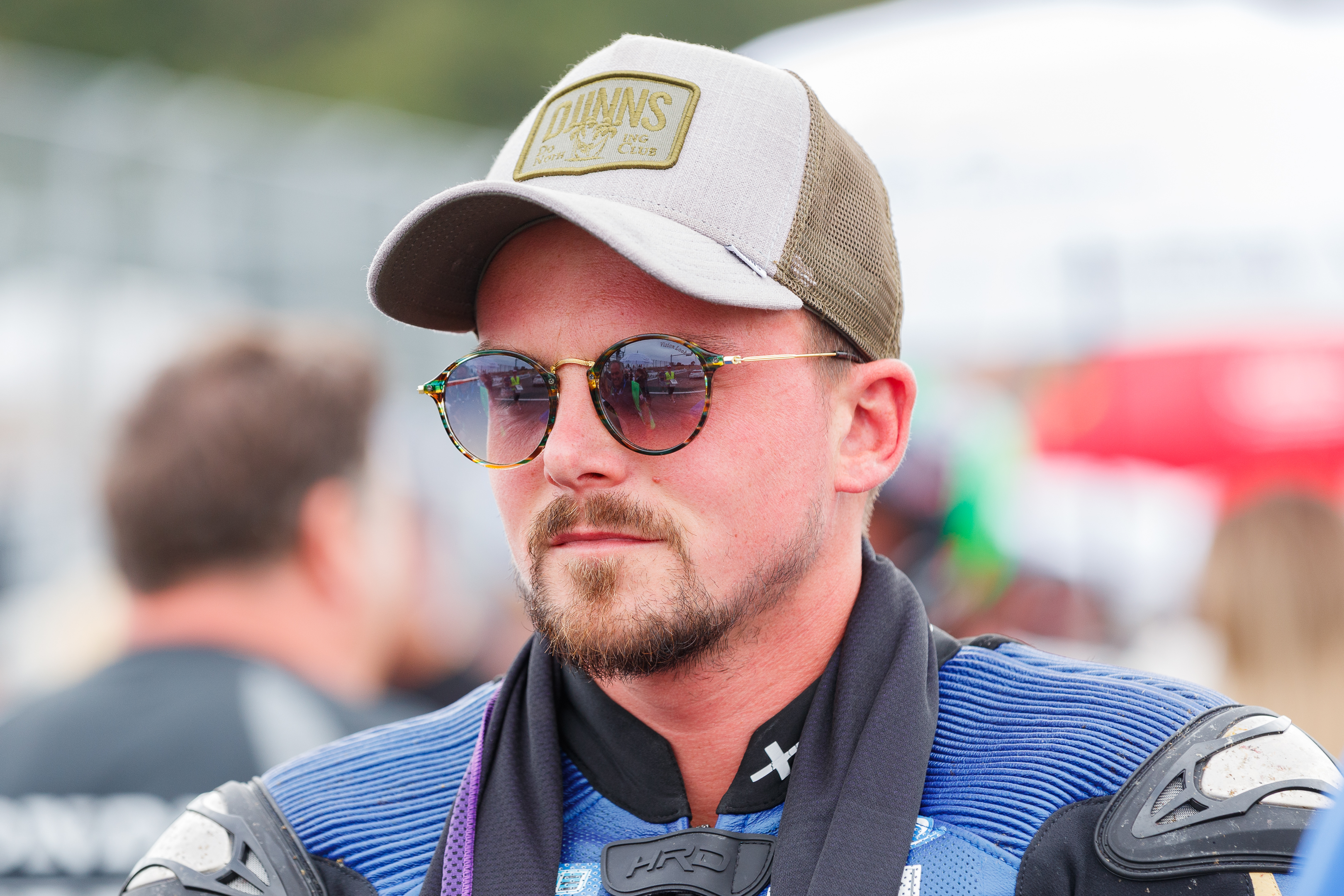
- Nationality: German
- Born: 21 December 1992 (age 33); Memmingen, Germany
- Current team: MBP Racing
- Bike number: 92

Daniel Kartheininger (born 21 December 1992) is a Grand Prix motorcycle racer from Germany. He currently competes in the IDM Superbike Championship aboard a Yamaha YZF-R1. He has previously competed in the ADAC Junior Cup, the Red Bull MotoGP Rookies Cup, the German IDM 125 Championship, the IDM Superbike Championship and the 125cc World Championship.

== Career statistics ==
=== Red Bull MotoGP Rookies Cup ===
==== Races by year ====
(key) (Races in bold indicate pole position, races in italics indicate fastest lap)

Year	1	2	3	4	5	6	7	8	9	10	Pos	Pts
2007	SPA; 11	ITA; Ret	GBR; 10	NED; 8	GER; 7	CZE; Ret	POR; 11	VAL; 11			12th	39
2008	SPA1; 14	SPA2; 17	POR; 7	FRA; 4	ITA; 5	GBR; Ret	NED; Ret	GER; 4	CZE1; 8	CZE2; Ret	13th	56

=== Grand Prix motorcycle racing ===
==== By season ====
Season	Class	Motorcycle	Team	Number	Race	Win	Podium	Pole	FLap	Pts	Plcd
2009	125cc	Honda	Freudenberg Racing Team	79	1	0	0	0	0	1	33rd
2010	125cc	KTM	Freudenberg Racing Team	61	1	0	0	0	0	6	22nd
2011	125cc	KTM	Caretta Technology Forward Team	12	2	0	0	0	0	0	NC
Total					**4**	**0**	**0**	**0**	**0**	**7**	

==== Races by year ====
Year	Class	Bike	1	2	3	4	5	6	7	8	9	10	11	12	13	14	15	16	17	Pos	Points
2009	125cc	Honda	QAT	JPN	SPA	FRA	ITA	CAT	NED	GER; 15	GBR	CZE	INP	RSM	POR	AUS	MAL	VAL		33rd	1
2010	125cc	KTM	QAT	SPA	FRA	ITA	GBR	NED	CAT	GER; 10	CZE	INP	RSM	ARA	JPN	MAL	AUS	POR	VAL	22nd	6
2011	125cc	KTM	QAT; 24	SPA; 22	POR	FRA	CAT	GBR	NED	ITA	GER	CZE	INP	RSM	ARA	JPN	AUS	MAL	VAL	NC	0
