= Jordi Dalmau =

Spanish motorcycle racer

- Nationality: Spanish
- Born: 21 May 1989 (age 37); Barcelona, Spain

Jordi Dalmau Nieves (born 21 May 1989) is a Grand Prix motorcycle racer from Spain.

== Career statistics ==
=== By season ===
Season	Class	Motorcycle	Team	Number	Race	Win	Podium	Pole	FLap	Pts	Plcd
2008	125cc	Honda	SAG Castrol	31	1	0	0	0	0	0	NC
2009	125cc	Honda	SAG-Castrol	31	3	0	0	0	0	0	NC
Total					4	0	0	0	0	0	

=== Races by year ===
Year	Class	Bike	1	2	3	4	5	6	7	8	9	10	11	12	13	14	15	16	17	Pos	Points
2008	125cc	Honda	QAT	SPA	POR	CHN	FRA	ITA	CAT; Ret	GBR	NED	GER	CZE	RSM	INP	JPN	AUS	MAL	VAL	NC	0
2009	125cc	Honda	QAT	JPN	SPA; 27	FRA	ITA	CAT; 25	NED	GER	GBR	CZE	INP	RSM	POR; 24	AUS	MAL	VAL		NC	0
