= Toby Markham =

British motorcycle racer

- Nationality: British
- Born: 12 March 1988 (age 38); Ashford, Kent, England

Toby Markham is a Grand Prix motorcycle racer from the United Kingdom. As a rookie in 2007, he finished first in the European Championship final in the 250cc class at the Cartagena Circuit, Spain, finishing fourth overall. In 2008, he won the 10-lap final of the 13-round NG Road Racing championship series at the Thruxton Circuit on a Honda NSR250.

== Career statistics ==
=== By season ===
Season	Class	Motorcycle	Team	Number	Race	Win	Podium	Pole	FLap	Pts	Plcd
2007	250cc	Yamaha	BM Groundworks	81	1	0	0	0	0	0	NC
2009	250cc	Honda	C&L Racing	54	3	0	0	0	0	2	27th
2009	250cc	Aprilia	C&L Racing	54	4	0	0	0	0	2	27th
Total					8	0	0	0	0	2	

=== Races by year ===
Year	Class	Bike	1	2	3	4	5	6	7	8	9	10	11	12	13	14	15	16	17	Pos	Points
2007	250cc	Yamaha	QAT	SPA	TUR	CHN	FRA	ITA	CAT	GBR; 17	NED	GER	CZE	RSM	POR	JPN	AUS	MAL	VAL	NC	0
2009	250cc	Honda	QAT	JPN	SPA	FRA; 14	ITA	CAT; 21	NED; Ret											27th	2
2009	250cc	Aprilia								GER; 17	GBR; 23	CZE; Ret	INP	RSM; Ret	POR	AUS	MAL	VAL		27th	2
