= Shuhei Aoyama (motorcyclist) =

Japanese motorcycle racer

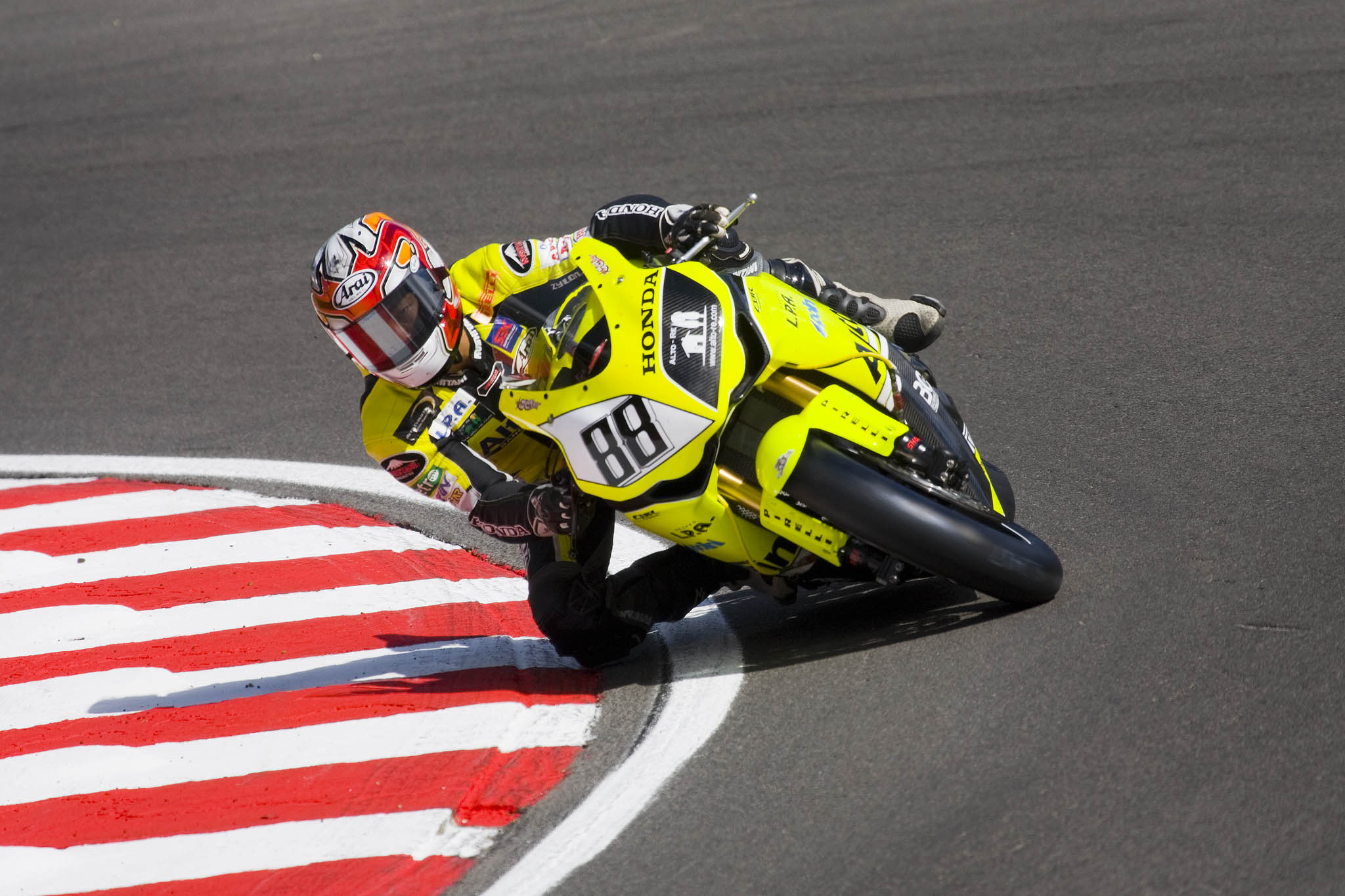
- Aoyama at Brands Hatch in 2008
- Nationality: Japanese
- Born: December 5, 1984 (age 41); Ichihara, Chiba
Motorcycle racing career statistics
Grand Prix motorcycle racing
Active years	2001 – 2002, 2004, 2006 - 2007, 2009
First race	2001 125cc Pacific Grand Prix
Last race	2009 250cc Valencian Grand Prix
Team	Honda
Championships	0
Starts / Wins / Podiums / Poles / F. laps / Points; 47 / 0 / 1 / 1 / 0 / 243

Shuhei Aoyama (born December 5, 1984, in Ichihara, Chiba) is a former Grand Prix motorcycle road racer. He is the younger brother of MotoGP rider Hiroshi Aoyama.

Aoyama rode in the All-Japan Road Racing Championship until 2005, when he won the 250cc championship with Honda. He previously won the 125cc championship in 2003, also with Honda. He also rode a couple of events as wildcard rider in the Grand Prix World Championships during his stint in Japan.

== Career ==
After winning the 250cc championship in Japan, Aoyama secured a Grand Prix World Championships ride with Honda's 250cc factory team in 2006. He replaced his brother Hiroshi Aoyama, who moved to KTM. He scored his first podium finish with a third-place at Le Mans, finishing just ahead of his brother, Hiroshi. He finished the season eighth in overall standings with 99 points and was named as Rookie Of The Year for his performance in his debut season. In 2007, he remained with the team, but he failed to improved on his rookie season. He failed to record a podium finish and finished the season 12th in overall standings. However, he recorded his first pole position in his home race at Motegi.

In 2008, Aoyama moved to World Superbike. He once again teamed up with Honda, riding a Honda CBR1000RR motorcycle with Alto Evolution Honda Superbike. However, he struggled to adapt with the bigger 1000 cc four-stroke bike and only managed two point-scoring position.

Aoyama was left without a permanent ride in 2009, but he made a return to 250cc Grand Prix World Championships as a wild-card rider in his home race at Motegi. He finished with a 6th place after starting from 17th on the grid.

Aoyama was unable to find a contract for the 2010 season even though he wanted to aim for the world title. Aoyama announced his active service retirement on his own blog on February 8, 2010. Afterwards, he participated in the Japanese Auto Race series.

== Career statistics ==
=== Grand Prix motorcycle racing ===
==== By season ====
Season	Class	Motorcycle	Team	Number	Races	Win	Podium	Pole	FLap	Pts	Plcd
2001	125cc	Honda	Showa Denki Team Harc-Pro	66	1	0	0	0	0	0	NC
2002	125cc	Honda	Showa Denki	66	2	0	0	0	0	21	20th
2002	125cc	Honda	PEV Moto ADAC Sachsen	66	2	0	0	0	0	21	20th
2003	125cc	Honda	Team Harc-Pro	66	2	0	0	0	0	0	NC
2004	250cc	Honda	Team Harc-Pro	76	1	0	0	0	0	8	26th
2005	250cc	Honda	Team Harc-Pro	75	1	0	0	0	0	0	NC
2006	250cc	Honda	Repsol Honda	73	16	0	1	0	0	99	8th
2007	250cc	Honda	Repsol Honda 250cc	73	17	0	0	1	0	90	12th
2009	250cc	Honda	Harc-Pro	73	1	0	0	0	0	10	19th
2009	250cc	Honda	Racing Team Germany	73	4	0	0	0	0	10	19th
Total					**47**	**0**	**1**	**1**	**0**	**243**	

==== Races by year ====
(key) (Races in bold indicate pole position, races in italics indicate fastest lap)

Year	Class	Bike	1	2	3	4	5	6	7	8	9	10	11	12	13	14	15	16	17	Pos	Pts
2001	125cc	Honda	JPN	RSA	SPA	FRA	ITA	CAT	NED	GBR	GER	CZE	POR	VAL	PAC; Ret	AUS	MAL	BRA		NC	0
2002	125cc	Honda	JPN; 6	RSA	SPA	FRA	ITA	CAT	NED; 25	GBR; 10	GER	CZE	POR	BRA	PAC; 11	MAL	AUS	VAL		20th	21
2003	125cc	Honda	JPN; Ret	RSA	SPA	FRA	ITA	CAT	NED	GBR	GER	CZE	POR	BRA	PAC; 21	MAL	AUS	VAL		NC	0
2004	250cc	Honda	RSA	SPA	FRA	ITA	CAT	NED	BRA	GER	GBR	CZE	POR	JPN; 8	QAT	MAL	AUS	VAL		26th	8
2005	250cc	Honda	SPA	POR	CHN	FRA	ITA	CAT	NED	GBR	GER	CZE	JPN; Ret	MAL	QAT	AUS	TUR	VAL		NC	0
2006	250cc	Honda	SPA; Ret	QAT; 13	TUR; Ret	CHN; 8	FRA; 3	ITA; 9	CAT; Ret	NED; 12	GBR; 13	GER; 9	CZE; 6	MAL; 6	AUS; 5	JPN; 6	POR; Ret	VAL; 6		8th	99
2007	250cc	Honda	QAT; 10	SPA; 7	TUR; 16	CHN; Ret	FRA; 9	ITA; 6	CAT; 11	GBR; 5	NED; 13	GER; 12	CZE; 9	RSM; 6	POR; Ret	**JPN**; 9	AUS; 8	MAL; 13	VAL; 17	12th	90
2009	250cc	Honda	QAT	JPN; 6	SPA	FRA	ITA	CAT	NED	GER	GBR	CZE	INP	RSM	POR; 12	AUS; 14	MAL; 10	VAL; 11		19th	27
