= Quentin Jacquet =

French motorcycle racer

- Nationality: French
- Born: 3 March 1991 (age 35); Lyon (France)
- Website: quentinjacquet.com

Quentin Jacquet (born 3 March 1991) is a Grand Prix motorcycle racer from France.

== Career statistics ==
=== Red Bull MotoGP Rookies Cup ===
==== Races by year ====
(key) (Races in bold indicate pole position, races in italics indicate fastest lap)

Year	1	2	3	4	5	6	7	8	9	10	Pos	Pts
2008	SPA1	SPA2	POR	FRA; 13	ITA	GBR	NED	GER	CZE1	CZE2	25th	3

=== Grand Prix motorcycle racing ===
==== By season ====
Season	Class	Motorcycle	Team	Number	Race	Win	Podium	Pole	FLap	Pts	Plcd
2009	125cc	Aprilia	Matteoni Racing	19	2	0	0	0	0	0	NC
2010	125cc	Aprilia	Stipa - Molenaar Racing GP	80	2	0	0	0	0	0	NC
Total					**4**	**0**	**0**	**0**	**0**	**0**	

==== Races by year ====
(key)

Year	Class	Bike	1	2	3	4	5	6	7	8	9	10	11	12	13	14	15	16	17	Pos.	Pts
2009	125cc	Aprilia	QAT	JPN	SPA	FRA	ITA	CAT	NED	GER	GBR	CZE	INP	RSM	POR; 23	AUS	MAL; 22	VAL		NC	0
2010	125cc	Aprilia	QAT; 23	SPA; 21	FRA	ITA	GBR	NED	CAT	GER	CZE	INP	RSM	ARA	JPN	MAL	AUS	POR	VAL	NC	0
