= Alex Debón =

Spanish motorcycle racer

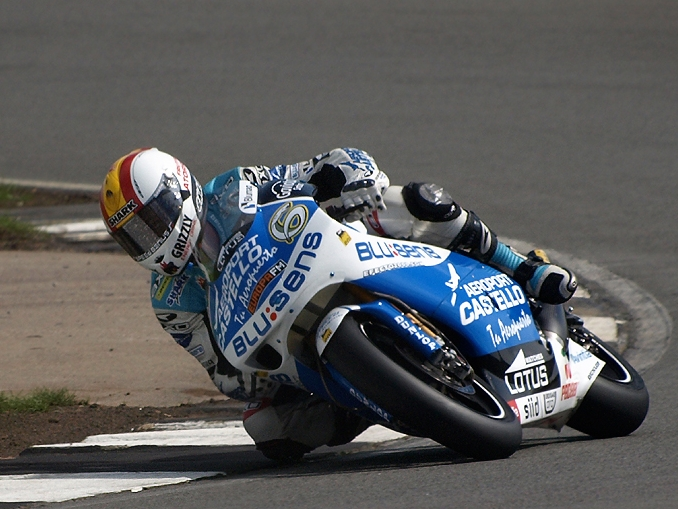
- Debón at the 2009 British Grand Prix
- Nationality: Spanish
- Born: 1 March 1976 (age 50); La Vall d'Uixó, Valencia, Spain
- Website: alexdebon.com
Motorcycle racing career statistics
Moto2 World Championship
Active years	2010
Manufacturers	FTR
Championships	0
2010 championship position	16th (73 pts)
Starts / Wins / Podiums / Poles / F. laps / Points; 14 / 0 / 1 / 0 / 0 / 73
250cc World Championship
Active years	1998–2009
Manufacturers	Honda, Aprilia
Championships	0
2009 championship position	10th (101 pts)
Starts / Wins / Podiums / Poles / F. laps / Points; 138 / 2 / 6 / 4 / 3 / 749

Alex Debón Latorre (born 1 March 1976 in La Vall d'Uixó, Valencia, Spain) is a former professional motorcycle road racer, who last competed in the Moto2 World Championship. Debón was the 2001 Spanish Road Racing Champion in the 250cc class.

== Career ==
Debón began racing internationally in 2000 after a handful of wildcard rides, but after several years of middling results he became Aprilia's test and reserve rider in 2006. He was promoted to a regular race ride for 2008, after some strong wildcard showings including Catalunya in 2006 and Brno in 2007.

Debón opened the season with a pole position in Qatar, leading on the final lap before dropping to fourth. He took his first GP win on 18 May 2008 at Le Mans in the French Grand Prix. Having qualified on pole, he correctly chose dry tyres in changeable conditions, and pulled away to a huge lead - resulting in speculation that his bike may contain traction control, in preparation for Aprilia's planned MotoGP class bike. It was the 112th GP start of his career.

For 2010, Debón raced for Ajo Motorsport in Moto2, with a chassis by FTR Moto. He finished second in the first race in Qatar. At Assen, he crashed heavily in qualifying, breaking his collarbone having set the third-quickest time in the session. During the season, Debón announced his intention to retire at the end of the season, and was replaced by Kevin Coghlan for the 2011 season.

== Career statistics ==
=== Grand Prix motorcycle racing ===
==== By season ====
Season	Class	Motorcycle	Team	Number	Race	Win	Podium	Pole	Pts	Plcd
1998	250cc	Honda	Hernandez Team	73	1	0	0	0	0	NC
1999	250cc	Honda	Team Chupa Chups	60	3	0	0	0	0	NC
2000	250cc	Aprilia	CC Valencia Airtel Aspar	30	16	0	0	0	33	15th
2001	250cc	Aprilia	Valencia Circuit Aspar Team	6	16	0	0	0	60	11th
2002	250cc	Aprilia	Campetella Racing	6	16	0	0	0	72	11th
2003	250cc	Honda	Troll Honda BQR	6	15	0	0	0	81	11th
2004	250cc	Honda	Wurth Honda BQR	6	15	0	0	0	82	12th
2005	250cc	Honda	Wurth Honda BQR	6	16	0	0	0	67	12th
2006	250cc	Aprilia	Fortuna Aprilia	6	5	0	0	0	50	13th
2006	250cc	Aprilia	Aprilia Racing	6	5	0	0	0	50	13th
2007	250cc	Aprilia	Aprilia Racing	6	4	0	1	0	27	18th
2008	250cc	Aprilia	Lotus Aprilia	6	16	2	4	2	176	4th
2009	250cc	Aprilia	Aeropuerto-Castello-Blusens	6	15	0	1	2	101	10th
2010	Moto2	FTR	Aeroport de Castello-Ajo	6	14	0	1	0	73	16th
Total					**152**	**2**	**7**	**4**	**822**	

==== Races by year ====
(key) (Races in bold indicate pole position, races in italics indicate fastest lap)

Year	Class	Bike	1	2	3	4	5	6	7	8	9	10	11	12	13	14	15	16	17	Pos	Pts
1998	250cc	Honda	JPN	MAL	SPA	ITA	FRA	MAD; Ret	NED	GBR	GER	CZE	IMO	CAT	AUS	ARG				NC	0
1999	250cc	Honda	MAL	JPN	SPA; 26	FRA	ITA	CAT; Ret	NED	GBR	GER	CZE	IMO	VAL; 18	AUS	RSA	BRA	ARG		NC	0
2000	250cc	Aprilia	RSA; 12	MAL; 9	JPN; Ret	SPA; 14	FRA; 15	ITA; Ret	CAT; Ret	NED; Ret	GBR; 6	GER; Ret	CZE; Ret	POR; Ret	VAL; 11	BRA; Ret	PAC; 12	AUS; 18		15th	33
2001	250cc	Aprilia	JPN; Ret	RSA; 15	SPA; 13	FRA; 10	ITA; 8	CAT; 11	NED; 20	GBR; 8	GER; 6	CZE; 10	POR; 12	VAL; 9	PAC; 18	AUS; Ret	MAL; 14	BRA; 16		11th	60
2002	250cc	Aprilia	JPN; 9	RSA; 9	SPA; 8	FRA; 9	ITA; Ret	CAT; 13	NED; 12	GBR; 9	GER; 10	CZE; 13	POR; Ret	BRA; Ret	PAC; 10	MAL; Ret	AUS; 9	VAL; 9		11th	72
2003	250cc	Honda	JPN; 11	RSA; DSQ	SPA; 9	FRA; 8	ITA; 12	CAT; 11	NED; 11	GBR; 10	GER; 9	CZE; DNS	POR; 11	BRA; 11	PAC; 9	MAL; Ret	AUS; 5	VAL; 10		11th	81
2004	250cc	Honda	RSA; 6	SPA; 5	FRA; 9	ITA; 15	CAT; 8	NED; 12	BRA; 9	GER; 11	GBR; Ret	CZE; DNS	POR; 8	JPN; 10	QAT; 8	MAL; Ret	AUS; 11	VAL; 14		12th	82
2005	250cc	Honda	SPA; 8	POR; 13	CHN; 11	FRA; 8	ITA; Ret	CAT; 11	NED; 13	GBR; Ret	GER; 12	CZE; 13	JPN; 9	MAL; Ret	QAT; 11	AUS; 9	TUR; 12	VAL; 11		12th	67
2006	250cc	Aprilia	SPA; DNS	QAT	TUR	CHN	FRA	ITA; 5	CAT; 5	NED; 4	GBR	GER	CZE; 12	MAL	AUS	JPN	POR	VAL; 5		13th	50
2007	250cc	Aprilia	QAT	SPA; 5	TUR	CHN	FRA	ITA	CAT; 16	GBR	NED	GER	CZE; Ret	RSM	POR	JPN	AUS	MAL	VAL; 3	18th	27
2008	250cc	Aprilia	**QAT**; 4	SPA; 6	POR; Ret	CHN; 5	**FRA**; 1	ITA; 2	CAT; 4	GBR; 7	NED; 4	GER; Ret	CZE; 1	RSM; Ret	INP; C	JPN; 3	AUS; 5	MAL; 6	VAL; Ret	4th	176
2009	250cc	Aprilia	QAT; 14	JPN; 5	**SPA**; Ret	FRA; Ret	ITA; 7	CAT; 5	NED; 6	GER; 2	GBR; 6	CZE; Ret	INP; Ret	RSM; 7	POR; 9	AUS; 13	MAL; 7	**VAL**; DNS		10th	101
2010	Moto2	FTR	QAT; 2	SPA; 25	FRA; 16	ITA; 10	GBR; 5	NED; DNS	CAT; Ret	GER; Ret	CZE; 7	INP; Ret	RSM	ARA; 22	JPN; 10	MAL; 5	AUS; 9	POR; DNS	VAL; 13	16th	73
