= 2008 Red Bull MotoGP Rookies Cup =

Motorcycle racing competition

2008 Red Bull MotoGP Rookies Cup season

Seasons
- ← 2007 2009 →

Starting its second season, the 2008 Red Bull MotoGP Rookies Cup season continued the search for future World Champions. The 2008 season begins with two races during the Spanish Grand Prix weekend at Jerez on March 29 and March 30 and ends with another double header at the Czech Republic Grand Prix in Brno on August 16 and August 17. Another six European GPs see single Rookies races on each Saturday, making it a ten-race championship, which is two more races than the last season.

The end of the season ended with two international team events that matched ten of the best riders from the Red Bull MotoGP Rookies Cup with ten of the best from the first and only year of the Red Bull AMA U.S. Rookies Cup. So twenty of the world's best teenagers will compete to see which side of the Atlantic can claim the Red Bull Riders Cup over two races, the first being held on September 13 at Indianapolis alongside the Grand Prix. The rematch will be on October 25 at the final Grand Prix of the season in Valencia.

The commercial rights of the championship are held by the rights-holders for the MotoGP World Championships, Dorna Sports.

The American dirt tracker J.D. Beach was proclaimed champion in the last race, in only his second season of road racing.

== Calendar ==
Round	Date	Grand Prix	Circuit	Pole position	Fastest lap	Race winner
1	March 29	(Spain) Spanish Grand Prix	Jerez	(Spain) Luis Salom	(Japan) Daijiro Hiura	(Spain) Luis Salom
1	March 30	(Spain) Spanish Grand Prix	Jerez	(Spain) Luis Salom	(France) Nelson Major	(Spain) Luis Salom
2	April 12	(Portugal) Portuguese Grand Prix	Estoril	(Japan) Daijiro Hiura	(Japan) Daijiro Hiura	(Japan) Daijiro Hiura
3	May 17	(France) French Grand Prix	Le Mans Bugatti Circuit	(Spain) Luis Salom	(United States) J. D. Beach	(Spain) Luis Salom
4	May 31	(Italy) Italian Grand Prix	Mugello Circuit	(Hungary) Péter Sebestyén	(Spain) Luis Salom	(Spain) Luis Salom
5	June 21	(United Kingdom) British Grand Prix	Donington Park	(Japan) Daijiro Hiura	(Norway) Sturla Fagerhaug	(Portugal) Miguel Oliveira
6	June 28	(Netherlands) Dutch TT	TT Circuit Assen	(Norway) Sturla Fagerhaug	(Portugal) Miguel Oliveira	(Portugal) Miguel Oliveira
7	July 12	(Germany) German Grand Prix	Sachsenring	(Spain) Luis Salom	(Germany) Daniel Kartheininger	(United States) J. D. Beach
8	August 16	Czech Republic Grand Prix	Brno	(South Africa) Mathew Scholtz	(Austria) Nico Thöni	(South Africa) Mathew Scholtz
8	August 17	Czech Republic Grand Prix	Brno	(South Africa) Mathew Scholtz	(United Kingdom) Matthew Hoyle	(Norway) Sturla Fagerhaug

== Entry list ==
Notes

- All Entrants were riding a KTM
- Tyres were supplied by Dunlop

No	Rider
3	(Germany) Daniel Kartheininger
6	(Hungary) Péter Sebestyén
7	(United Kingdom) Deane Brown
11	(Finland) Niklas Ajo
20	(South Africa) Mathew Scholtz
21	(France) Florian Marino
22	(Spain) Daniel Ruiz
24	(United Kingdom) Harry Stafford
27	(Italy) Alessio Cappella
28	(Germany) Markus Reiterberger
30	(Australia) Dylan Mavin
32	(United Kingdom) Matthew Hoyle
33	(Norway) Sturla Fagerhaug
36	(Austria) Nico Thöni
39	(Spain) Luis Salom
44	(Portugal) Miguel Oliveira*
46	(Japan) Daijiro Hiura
49	(United Kingdom) Ben McConnachie
52	(United Kingdom) Adam Blacklock
59	(United States) J. D. Beach
68	(Japan) Sasuke Shinozaki
69	(France) Nelson Major
74	(Italy) Kevin Calia
77	(France) Quentin Jacquet*
84	(Czech Republic) Jakub Kornfeil
92	(Spain) Cristian Trabalón
99	(Republic of Ireland) Joshua Elliott

- Guest Riders

== Season standings ==
=== Scoring system ===
Points are awarded to the top fifteen finishers. Rider has to finish the race to earn points.

Position	1st	2nd	3rd	4th	5th	6th	7th	8th	9th	10th	11th	12th	13th	14th	15th
Points	25	20	16	13	11	10	9	8	7	6	5	4	3	2	1

- Each rider's lowest score discounted.

=== Riders' standings ===
Pos	Rider	ESP (Spain)		POR (Portugal)	FRA (France)	ITA (Italy)	GBR (United Kingdom)	NED (Netherlands)	GER (Germany)	CZE (Czech Republic)		Pts
1	(United States) J. D. Beach	2	2	2	2	2	5	8	1	11	Ret	149
2	(Spain) Luis Salom	**1**	**1**	4	**1**	1	9	7	**Ret**	Ret	3	145
3	(Norway) Sturla Fagerhaug	7	4	3	6	7	2	**2**	Ret	2	1	142
4	(Japan) Daijiro Hiura	5	5	**1**		3	**Ret**	4	2	12	8	108
5	(France) Nelson Major	4	6	5	3	11	4	Ret	5	18	4	92
6	(South Africa) Mathew Scholtz	Ret	10	11	8	9	3	Ret	6	**1**	**7**	86
7	(United Kingdom) Matthew Hoyle	Ret	14	DNS	15	10		3	3	3	2	77
8	(Spain) Daniel Ruiz	6	7	10	7	4	13	6	Ret	21	13	63
9	(Czech Republic) Jakub Kornfeil	8	9	19	9	6	7	10	Ret	10	6	63
10	(France) Florian Marino	11	11	13	5	19	Ret	5	7	7	5	62
11	(Germany) Markus Reiterberger	9	8	9	Ret	8	12	12	10	6	9	61
12	(Portugal) Miguel Oliveira			8			1	1				58
13	(Germany) Daniel Kartheininger	14	17	7	4	5	Ret	Ret	4	8	Ret	56
14	(United Kingdom) Deane Brown	3	3	6						4	Ret	55
15	(Hungary) Péter Sebestyén	15	15	17	11	**Ret**	6	16	8	13	NC	28
16	(Spain) Cristian Trabalón	Ret	11	15	10	16		9	9			26
17	(Japan) Sasuke Shinozaki	Ret	18	14	14	13	8	14	Ret	9	19	24
18	(Italy) Kevin Calia	13	19	12		Ret	10	17	11	Ret	10	24
19	(United Kingdom) Adam Blacklock	12	12	16	12	15	Ret	19	14	14	12	21
20	(Austria) Nico Thöni							15	12	5	14	17
21	(Italy) Alessio Cappella					18	11	13	Ret	19	11	13
22	(Republic of Ireland) Joshua Elliott	10	16	Ret	Ret	12	Ret	18	Ret	17	15	11
23	(Australia) Dylan Mavin	Ret	DNS		Ret	14	Ret	11	16	20	16	7
24	(United Kingdom) Harry Stafford	16	20	18	16	17	Ret	20	13	15	17	4
25	(France) Quentin Jacquet				13							3
26	(Finland) Niklas Ajo	DNS	DNS			20	Ret	DNS	15	16	18	1
	(United Kingdom) Ben McConnachie				17	21	Ret					0
Pos	Rider	ESP (Spain)		POR (Portugal)	FRA (France)	ITA (Italy)	GBR (United Kingdom)	NED (Netherlands)	GER (Germany)	CZE (Czech Republic)		Pts

Colour	Result
Gold	Winner
Silver	Second place
Bronze	Third place
Green	Points classification
Blue	Non-points classification
Blue	Non-classified finish (NC)
Purple	Retired, not classified (Ret)
Red	Did not qualify (DNQ)
Red	Did not pre-qualify (DNPQ)
Black	Disqualified (DSQ)
White	Did not start (DNS)
White	Withdrew (WD)
White	Race cancelled (C)
Blank	Did not practice (DNP)
Blank	Did not arrive (DNA)
Blank	Excluded (EX)

**Bold** - Pole
Italics - Fastest Lap
