= 2008 British motorcycle Grand Prix =

(United Kingdom) 2008 British Grand Prix
Race details
- Race 8 of 18 races in the 2008 Grand Prix motorcycle racing season
- Date: 22 June 2008
- Official name: bwin.com British Grand Prix
- Location: Donington Park
- Course: Permanent racing facility; 4.023 km (2.500 mi)

MotoGP
Pole position
- Rider: (Australia) Casey Stoner
- Time: 1:38.232
Fastest lap
- Rider: (Australia) Casey Stoner
- Time: 1:28.773
Podium
- First: (Australia) Casey Stoner
- Second: (Italy) Valentino Rossi
- Third: (Spain) Dani Pedrosa

250cc
Pole position
- Rider: (Spain) Álvaro Bautista
- Time: 1:31.834
Fastest lap
- Rider: (Italy) Marco Simoncelli
- Time: 1:32.474
Podium
- First: (Finland) Mika Kallio
- Second: (Italy) Marco Simoncelli
- Third: (Spain) Álvaro Bautista

125cc
Pole position
- Rider: (Italy) Simone Corsi
- Time: 1:37.488
Fastest lap
- Rider: (United Kingdom) Scott Redding
- Time: 1:38.704
Podium
- First: (United Kingdom) Scott Redding
- Second: (France) Mike Di Meglio
- Third: (Spain) Marc Márquez

The 2008 British motorcycle Grand Prix was the eighth round of the 2008 MotoGP championship. It took place on the weekend of 20–22 June 2008 at the Donington Park circuit.

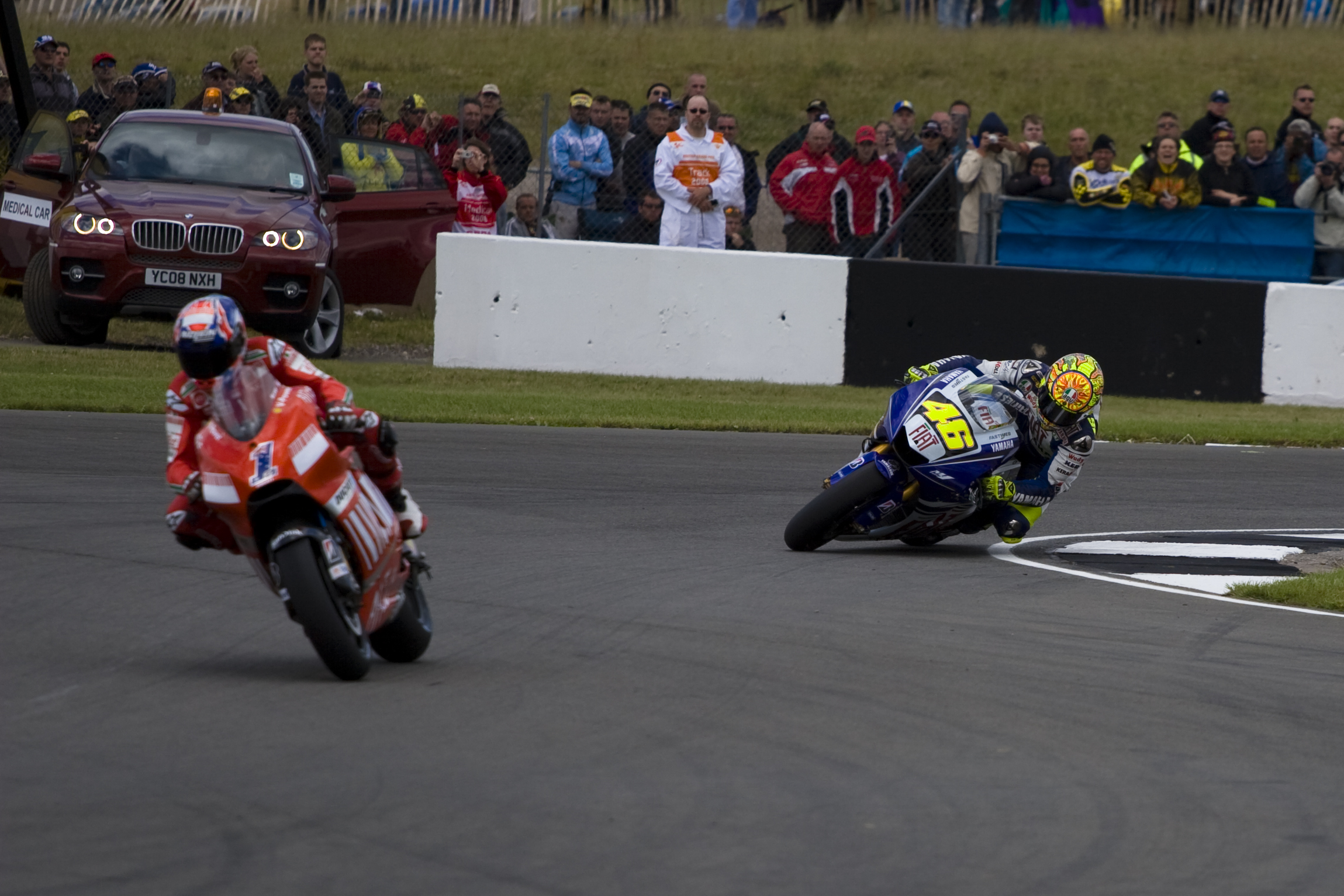
Valentino Rossi, trying to close the gap to Casey Stoner on the opening lap. Stoner went on to win the race, with Rossi finishing a distant second in the MotoGP race.

== MotoGP classification ==
Pos.	No.	Rider	Team	Manufacturer	Laps	Time/Retired	Grid	Points
1	1	(Australia) Casey Stoner	Ducati Marlboro Team	Ducati	30	44:44.982	1	25
2	46	(Italy) Valentino Rossi	Fiat Yamaha Team	Yamaha	30	+5.789	2	20
3	2	(Spain) Dani Pedrosa	Repsol Honda Team	Honda	30	+8.347	9	16
4	5	(United States) Colin Edwards	Tech 3 Yamaha	Yamaha	30	+12.678	5	13
5	4	(Italy) Andrea Dovizioso	JiR Team Scot MotoGP	Honda	30	+14.801	6	11
6	48	(Spain) Jorge Lorenzo	Fiat Yamaha Team	Yamaha	30	+15.690	17	10
7	69	(United States) Nicky Hayden	Repsol Honda Team	Honda	30	+18.196	4	9
8	7	(Australia) Chris Vermeulen	Rizla Suzuki MotoGP	Suzuki	30	+21.666	3	8
9	56	(Japan) Shinya Nakano	San Carlo Honda Gresini	Honda	30	+29.354	10	7
10	13	(Australia) Anthony West	Kawasaki Racing Team	Kawasaki	30	+41.030	7	6
11	24	(Spain) Toni Elías	Alice Team	Ducati	30	+44.426	18	5
12	14	(France) Randy de Puniet	LCR Honda MotoGP	Honda	30	+46.199	14	4
13	50	(France) Sylvain Guintoli	Alice Team	Ducati	30	+48.731	12	3
14	11	(United States) Ben Spies	Rizla Suzuki MotoGP	Suzuki	30	+49.591	8	2
15	15	(San Marino) Alex de Angelis	San Carlo Honda Gresini	Honda	30	+1:22.186	13	1
16	33	(Italy) Marco Melandri	Ducati Marlboro Team	Ducati	30	+1:30.021	15	
17	52	(United Kingdom) James Toseland	Tech 3 Yamaha	Yamaha	29	+1 lap	16	
Ret	21	(United States) John Hopkins	Kawasaki Racing Team	Kawasaki	16	Retirement	11	

== 250 cc classification ==
Pos.	No.	Rider	Manufacturer	Laps	Time/Retired	Grid	Points
1	36	(Finland) Mika Kallio	KTM	27	42:14.410	14	25
2	58	(Italy) Marco Simoncelli	Gilera	27	+0.353	2	20
3	19	(Spain) Álvaro Bautista	Aprilia	27	+1.237	1	16
4	21	(Spain) Héctor Barberá	Aprilia	27	+8.875	3	13
5	12	(Switzerland) Thomas Lüthi	Aprilia	27	+11.359	4	11
6	4	(Japan) Hiroshi Aoyama	KTM	27	+16.124	6	10
7	6	(Spain) Alex Debón	Aprilia	27	+16.136	11	9
8	60	(Spain) Julián Simón	KTM	27	+18.007	7	8
9	72	(Japan) Yuki Takahashi	Honda	27	+33.271	5	7
10	41	(Spain) Aleix Espargaró	Aprilia	27	+49.681	8	6
11	15	(Italy) Roberto Locatelli	Gilera	27	+52.534	13	5
12	17	(Czech Republic) Karel Abraham	Aprilia	27	+55.311	16	4
13	52	(Czech Republic) Lukáš Pešek	Aprilia	27	+57.399	9	3
14	54	(San Marino) Manuel Poggiali	Gilera	27	+57.641	15	2
15	55	(Spain) Héctor Faubel	Aprilia	27	+1:04.329	17	1
16	14	(Thailand) Ratthapark Wilairot	Honda	27	+1:06.156	18	
17	32	(Italy) Fabrizio Lai	Gilera	27	+1:15.812	10	
18	7	(Spain) Russell Gómez	Aprilia	26	+1 lap	22	
19	45	(Indonesia) Doni Tata Pradita	Yamaha	26	+1 lap	23	
Ret	50	(Republic of Ireland) Eugene Laverty	Aprilia	19	Retirement	20	
Ret	25	(Italy) Alex Baldolini	Aprilia	13	Retirement	19	
Ret	75	(Italy) Mattia Pasini	Aprilia	12	Retirement	12	
Ret	10	(Hungary) Imre Tóth	Aprilia	11	Retirement	21	
DNS	63	(United Kingdom) Toby Markham	Yamaha		Did not start		
OFFICIAL 250cc REPORT

== 125 cc classification ==
Pos.	No.	Rider	Manufacturer	Laps	Time/Retired	Grid	Points
1	45	(United Kingdom) Scott Redding	Aprilia	25	41:39.472	4	25
2	63	(France) Mike Di Meglio	Derbi	25	+5.324	20	20
3	93	(Spain) Marc Márquez	KTM	25	+5.806	7	16
4	33	(Spain) Sergio Gadea	Aprilia	25	+13.990	3	13
5	24	(Italy) Simone Corsi	Aprilia	25	+16.855	1	11
6	71	(Japan) Tomoyoshi Koyama	KTM	25	+17.181	9	10
7	6	(Spain) Joan Olivé	Derbi	25	+18.014	14	9
8	73	(Japan) Takaaki Nakagami	Aprilia	25	+18.222	21	8
9	11	(Germany) Sandro Cortese	Aprilia	25	+18.404	16	7
10	38	(United Kingdom) Bradley Smith	Aprilia	25	+18.891	11	6
11	12	(Spain) Esteve Rabat	KTM	25	+18.976	12	5
12	60	(Austria) Michael Ranseder	Aprilia	25	+28.269	19	4
13	34	(Switzerland) Randy Krummenacher	KTM	25	+28.347	18	3
14	35	(Italy) Raffaele De Rosa	KTM	25	+29.403	10	2
15	8	(Italy) Lorenzo Zanetti	KTM	25	+35.763	23	1
16	16	(France) Jules Cluzel	Loncin	25	+35.868	25	
17	51	(United States) Stevie Bonsey	Aprilia	25	+38.158	15	
18	18	(Spain) Nicolás Terol	Aprilia	25	+42.766	6	
19	77	(Switzerland) Dominique Aegerter	Derbi	25	+42.924	26	
20	27	(Italy) Stefano Bianco	Aprilia	25	+1:06.296	22	
21	21	(Germany) Robin Lässer	Aprilia	25	+1:10.158	29	
22	30	(Spain) Pere Tutusaus	Aprilia	25	+1:10.905	24	
23	69	(France) Louis Rossi	Honda	25	+1:29.269	31	
24	95	(Romania) Robert Mureșan	Aprilia	24	+1 lap	30	
25	56	(Netherlands) Hugo van den Berg	Aprilia	24	+1 lap	28	
26	67	(United Kingdom) Lee Costello	Honda	24	+1 lap	36	
27	19	(Italy) Roberto Lacalendola	Aprilia	24	+1 lap	32	
Ret	29	(Italy) Andrea Iannone	Aprilia	19	Accident	5	
Ret	17	(Germany) Stefan Bradl	Aprilia	18	Retirement	17	
Ret	64	(United Kingdom) Matthew Hoyle	Honda	14	Accident	33	
Ret	66	(United Kingdom) Connor Behan	Honda	14	Retirement	34	
Ret	68	(Republic of Ireland) Paul Jordan	Honda	14	Retirement	37	
Ret	5	(France) Alexis Masbou	Loncin	5	Accident	27	
Ret	65	(United Kingdom) Luke Hinton	Honda	4	Accident	35	
Ret	1	(Hungary) Gábor Talmácsi	Aprilia	1	Accident	2	
Ret	22	(Spain) Pablo Nieto	KTM	0	Accident	8	
Ret	99	(United Kingdom) Danny Webb	Aprilia	0	Accident	13	
DNS	44	(Spain) Pol Espargaró	Derbi		Did not start		
WD	7	(Spain) Efrén Vázquez	Aprilia		Withdrew		
OFFICIAL 125cc REPORT

== Championship standings after the race (MotoGP) ==
Below are the standings for the top five riders and constructors after round eight has concluded.

Riders' Championship standings

Pos.	Rider	Points
1	(Italy) Valentino Rossi	162
2	(Spain) Dani Pedrosa	151
3	(Australia) Casey Stoner	117
4	(Spain) Jorge Lorenzo	104
5	(United States) Colin Edwards	82

Constructors' Championship standings

Pos.	Constructor	Points
1	(Japan) Yamaha	180
2	(Japan) Honda	151
3	(Italy) Ducati	122
4	(Japan) Suzuki	71
5	(Japan) Kawasaki	41

- Note: Only the top five positions are included for both sets of standings.

Previous race: 2008 Catalan Grand Prix	FIM Grand Prix World Championship; 2008 season	Next race: 2008 Dutch TT
Previous race: 2007 British Grand Prix	British motorcycle Grand Prix	Next race: 2009 British Grand Prix
