= Sasuke Shinozaki =

Japanese motorcycle racer

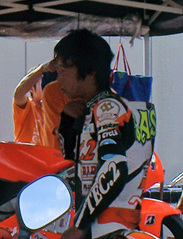
- Shinozaki at the 2010 Japanese Grand Prix
- Nationality: Japanese
- Born: 8 June 1993 (age 33)
Motorcycle racing career statistics
125cc World Championship
Active years	2010
Manufacturers	Yamaha
Starts / Wins / Podiums / Poles / F. laps / Points; 1 / 0 / 0 / 0 / 0 / 0

Sasuke Shinozaki (篠崎 佐助, Shinozaki Sasuke; born 8 June 1993) is a Japanese motorcycle racer. He has competed in the MFJ All Japan Road Race GP125 Championship, the Red Bull MotoGP Rookies Cup, the MFJ All Japan J-GP3 Championship and the MFJ All Japan Road Race ST600 Championship.

== Career statistics ==
=== Red Bull MotoGP Rookies Cup ===
==== Races by year ====
(key) (Races in bold indicate pole position, races in italics indicate fastest lap)

Year	1	2	3	4	5	6	7	8	9	10	Pos	Pts
2008	SPA1; Ret	SPA2; 18	POR; 14	FRA; 14	ITA; 13	GBR; 8	NED; 14	GER; Ret	CZE1; 9	CZE2; 19	17th	24

=== Grand Prix motorcycle racing ===
==== By season ====
Season	Class	Motorcycle	Team	Race	Win	Podium	Pole	FLap	Pts	Plcd
2010	125cc	Yamaha	Team Tec2	1	0	0	0	0	0	NC
Total				**1**	**0**	**0**	**0**	**0**	**0**	

==== Races by year ====
Year	Class	Bike	1	2	3	4	5	6	7	8	9	10	11	12	13	14	15	16	17	Pos.	Pts
2010	125cc	Yamaha	QAT	SPA	FRA	ITA	GBR	NED	CAT	GER	CZE	INP	RSM	ARA	JPN; 21	MAL	AUS	POR	VAL	NC	0
