= 2007 Italian motorcycle Grand Prix =

(Italy) 2007 Italian Grand Prix
Race details
- Race 6 of 18 races in the 2007 Grand Prix motorcycle racing season
- Date: 27 May 2007
- Official name: Gran Premio d'Italia Alice
- Location: Autodromo Internazionale del Mugello
- Course: Permanent racing facility; 5.245 km (3.259 mi)

MotoGP
Pole position
- Rider: (Australia) Casey Stoner
- Time: 2:00.359
Fastest lap
- Rider: (Spain) Dani Pedrosa
- Time: 1:50.357
Podium
- First: (Italy) Valentino Rossi
- Second: (Spain) Dani Pedrosa
- Third: (Brazil) Alex Barros

250cc
Pole position
- Rider: (Spain) Álvaro Bautista
- Time: 1:57.435
Fastest lap
- Rider: (Spain) Héctor Barberá
- Time: 1:54.061
Podium
- First: (Spain) Álvaro Bautista
- Second: (San Marino) Alex de Angelis
- Third: (Spain) Héctor Barberá

125cc
Pole position
- Rider: (Spain) Héctor Faubel
- Time: 2:15.309
Fastest lap
- Rider: (Spain) Sergio Gadea
- Time: 1:58.636
Podium
- First: (Spain) Héctor Faubel
- Second: (Spain) Sergio Gadea
- Third: (Italy) Simone Corsi

The 2007 Italian motorcycle Grand Prix was the sixth round of the 2007 MotoGP championship. It took place on the weekend of 25–27 May 2007 at the Mugello Circuit.

== MotoGP classification ==
Pos.	No.	Rider	Team	Manufacturer	Laps	Time/Retired	Grid	Points
1	46	(Italy) Valentino Rossi	Fiat Yamaha Team	Yamaha	23	42:42.385	3	25
2	26	(Spain) Dani Pedrosa	Repsol Honda Team	Honda	23	+3.074	8	20
3	4	(Brazil) Alex Barros	Pramac d'Antin	Ducati	23	+5.956	10	16
4	27	(Australia) Casey Stoner	Ducati Marlboro Team	Ducati	23	+6.012	1	13
5	21	(United States) John Hopkins	Rizla Suzuki MotoGP	Suzuki	23	+13.244	9	11
6	24	(Spain) Toni Elías	Honda Gresini	Honda	23	+19.255	15	10
7	65	(Italy) Loris Capirossi	Ducati Marlboro Team	Ducati	23	+19.646	5	9
8	71	(Australia) Chris Vermeulen	Rizla Suzuki MotoGP	Suzuki	23	+22.810	2	8
9	33	(Italy) Marco Melandri	Honda Gresini	Honda	23	+22.837	6	7
10	1	(United States) Nicky Hayden	Repsol Honda Team	Honda	23	+24.413	13	6
11	66	(Germany) Alex Hofmann	Pramac d'Antin	Ducati	23	+24.781	11	5
12	5	(United States) Colin Edwards	Fiat Yamaha Team	Yamaha	23	+28.001	16	4
13	56	(Japan) Shinya Nakano	Konica Minolta Honda	Honda	23	+36.733	12	3
14	50	(France) Sylvain Guintoli	Dunlop Yamaha Tech 3	Yamaha	23	+45.098	17	2
15	6	(Japan) Makoto Tamada	Dunlop Yamaha Tech 3	Yamaha	23	+45.145	20	1
16	19	(France) Olivier Jacque	Kawasaki Racing Team	Kawasaki	23	+45.217	4	
17	10	(United States) Kenny Roberts Jr.	Team Roberts	KR212V	23	+1:27.222	18	
Ret	7	(Spain) Carlos Checa	Honda LCR	Honda	9	Accident	14	
Ret	80	(United States) Kurtis Roberts	Team Roberts	KR212V	3	Retirement	19	
Ret	14	(France) Randy de Puniet	Kawasaki Racing Team	Kawasaki	1	Accident	7	

== 250 cc classification ==
Pos.	No.	Rider	Manufacturer	Laps	Time/Retired	Grid	Points
1	19	(Spain) Álvaro Bautista	Aprilia	21	40:18.605	1	25
2	3	(San Marino) Alex de Angelis	Aprilia	21	+0.087	5	20
3	80	(Spain) Héctor Barberá	Aprilia	21	+7.665	6	16
4	34	(Italy) Andrea Dovizioso	Honda	21	+7.751	2	13
5	12	(Switzerland) Thomas Lüthi	Aprilia	21	+27.267	4	11
6	73	(Japan) Shuhei Aoyama	Honda	21	+27.522	3	10
7	60	(Spain) Julián Simón	Honda	21	+27.774	10	9
8	1	(Spain) Jorge Lorenzo	Aprilia	21	+32.238	20	8
9	58	(Italy) Marco Simoncelli	Gilera	21	+51.455	13	7
10	14	(Australia) Anthony West	Aprilia	21	+1:04.308	9	6
11	55	(Japan) Yuki Takahashi	Honda	21	+1:04.318	27	5
12	41	(Spain) Aleix Espargaró	Aprilia	21	+1:04.462	21	4
13	32	(Italy) Fabrizio Lai	Aprilia	21	+1:04.556	26	3
14	25	(Italy) Alex Baldolini	Aprilia	21	+1:04.570	12	2
15	44	(Japan) Taro Sekiguchi	Aprilia	21	+1:05.162	24	1
16	17	(Czech Republic) Karel Abraham	Aprilia	21	+1:10.583	14	
17	28	(Germany) Dirk Heidolf	Aprilia	21	+1:10.587	16	
18	15	(Italy) Roberto Locatelli	Gilera	21	+1:20.650	15	
19	16	(France) Jules Cluzel	Aprilia	21	+1:20.921	18	
20	50	(Republic of Ireland) Eugene Laverty	Honda	21	+1:21.282	25	
21	4	(Japan) Hiroshi Aoyama	KTM	21	+1:46.776	7	
22	10	(Hungary) Imre Tóth	Aprilia	21	+1:54.965	11	
23	9	(Spain) Arturo Tizón	Aprilia	20	+1 lap	23	
24	65	(Italy) Thomas Tallevi	Yamaha	20	+1 lap	22	
Ret	64	(Italy) Omar Menghi	Aprilia	19	Retirement	17	
Ret	36	(Finland) Mika Kallio	KTM	2	Retirement	8	
Ret	8	(Thailand) Ratthapark Wilairot	Honda	0	Retirement	19	
OFFICIAL 250cc REPORT

== 125 cc classification ==
Pos.	No.	Rider	Manufacturer	Laps	Time/Retired	Grid	Points
1	55	(Spain) Héctor Faubel	Aprilia	20	40:14.164	1	25
2	33	(Spain) Sergio Gadea	Aprilia	20	+0.020	20	20
3	24	(Italy) Simone Corsi	Aprilia	20	+0.066	14	16
4	14	(Hungary) Gábor Talmácsi	Aprilia	20	+0.134	3	13
5	71	(Japan) Tomoyoshi Koyama	KTM	20	+1.662	5	11
6	75	(Italy) Mattia Pasini	Aprilia	20	+1.691	9	10
7	11	(Germany) Sandro Cortese	Aprilia	20	+1.813	15	9
8	38	(United Kingdom) Bradley Smith	Honda	20	+2.959	11	8
9	44	(Spain) Pol Espargaró	Aprilia	20	+17.495	22	7
10	8	(Italy) Lorenzo Zanetti	Aprilia	20	+18.277	17	6
11	60	(Austria) Michael Ranseder	Derbi	20	+23.855	16	5
12	18	(Spain) Nicolás Terol	Derbi	20	+32.919	21	4
13	34	(Switzerland) Randy Krummenacher	KTM	20	+36.260	19	3
14	35	(Italy) Raffaele De Rosa	Aprilia	20	+38.199	6	2
15	77	(Switzerland) Dominique Aegerter	Aprilia	20	+1:05.054	24	1
16	37	(Netherlands) Joey Litjens	Honda	20	+1:05.106	18	
17	42	(Italy) Simone Sancioni	Aprilia	20	+1:05.395	26	
18	15	(Italy) Federico Sandi	Aprilia	20	+1:05.648	27	
19	95	(Romania) Robert Mureșan	Derbi	20	+1:05.700	13	
20	51	(United States) Stevie Bonsey	KTM	20	+1:25.417	32	
21	99	(United Kingdom) Danny Webb	Honda	20	+1:25.595	29	
22	53	(Italy) Simone Grotzkyj	Aprilia	20	+1:45.299	28	
23	56	(Netherlands) Hugo van den Berg	Aprilia	20	+1:46.907	34	
24	20	(Italy) Roberto Tamburini	Aprilia	19	+1 lap	31	
Ret	52	(Czech Republic) Lukáš Pešek	Derbi	19	Accident	8	
Ret	27	(Italy) Stefano Bianco	Aprilia	17	Accident	30	
Ret	29	(Italy) Andrea Iannone	Aprilia	16	Accident	7	
Ret	22	(Spain) Pablo Nieto	Aprilia	10	Retirement	25	
Ret	7	(France) Alexis Masbou	Honda	7	Accident	12	
Ret	87	(Italy) Roberto Lacalendola	Aprilia	7	Retirement	23	
Ret	63	(France) Mike Di Meglio	Honda	3	Accident	2	
Ret	6	(Spain) Joan Olivé	Aprilia	3	Retirement	10	
Ret	13	(Italy) Dino Lombardi	Honda	0	Accident	4	
DNS	41	(Germany) Tobias Siegert	Aprilia	0	Did not start	33	
OFFICIAL 125cc REPORT

== Championship standings after the race (MotoGP) ==
Below are the standings for the top five riders and constructors after round six has concluded.

Riders' Championship standings

Pos.	Rider	Points
1	(Australia) Casey Stoner	115
2	(Italy) Valentino Rossi	106
3	(Spain) Dani Pedrosa	82
4	(Italy) Marco Melandri	68
5	(Australia) Chris Vermeulen	63

Constructors' Championship standings

Pos.	Constructor	Points
1	(Italy) Ducati	118
2	(Japan) Honda	109
3	(Japan) Yamaha	106
4	(Japan) Suzuki	82
5	(Japan) Kawasaki	28

- Note: Only the top five positions are included for both sets of standings.

Previous race: 2007 French Grand Prix	FIM Grand Prix World Championship; 2007 season	Next race: 2007 Catalan Grand Prix
Previous race: 2006 Italian Grand Prix	Italian motorcycle Grand Prix	Next race: 2008 Italian Grand Prix
