= 2009 Australian motorcycle Grand Prix =

(Australia) 2009 Australian Grand Prix
Race details
- Race 15 of 17 races in the 2009 Grand Prix motorcycle racing season
- Date: 18 October 2009
- Official name: Iveco Australian Motorcycle Grand Prix
- Location: Phillip Island Grand Prix Circuit
- Course: Permanent racing facility; 4.448 km (2.764 mi)

MotoGP
Pole position
- Rider: (Australia) Casey Stoner
- Time: 1:30.341
Fastest lap
- Rider: (Italy) Valentino Rossi
- Time: 1:30.085
Podium
- First: (Australia) Casey Stoner
- Second: (Italy) Valentino Rossi
- Third: (Spain) Dani Pedrosa

250cc
Pole position
- Rider: (Italy) Raffaele De Rosa
- Time: 1:33.389
Fastest lap
- Rider: (Italy) Raffaele De Rosa
- Time: 1:33.519
Podium
- First: (Italy) Marco Simoncelli
- Second: (Spain) Héctor Barberá
- Third: (Italy) Raffaele De Rosa

125cc
Pole position
- Rider: (Spain) Pol Espargaró
- Time: 1:37.770
Fastest lap
- Rider: (Germany) Sandro Cortese
- Time: 1:37.869
Podium
- First: (Spain) Julián Simón
- Second: (United Kingdom) Bradley Smith
- Third: (Germany) Sandro Cortese

The 2009 Australian motorcycle Grand Prix was the fifteenth round of the 2009 Grand Prix motorcycle racing season. It took place on the weekend of 16–18 October 2009 at the Phillip Island Grand Prix Circuit. Ducati rider Casey Stoner won the grand prix, in his home race. Championship leader Valentino Rossi finished second, further increasing his championship lead over rival Jorge Lorenzo, who crashed out and failed to score any points. This also marked the final Grand Prix win in the career of Marco Simoncelli before his death 2 years later on 23 October 2011 at the 2011 Malaysian motorcycle Grand Prix after suffering a fatal crash in Race.

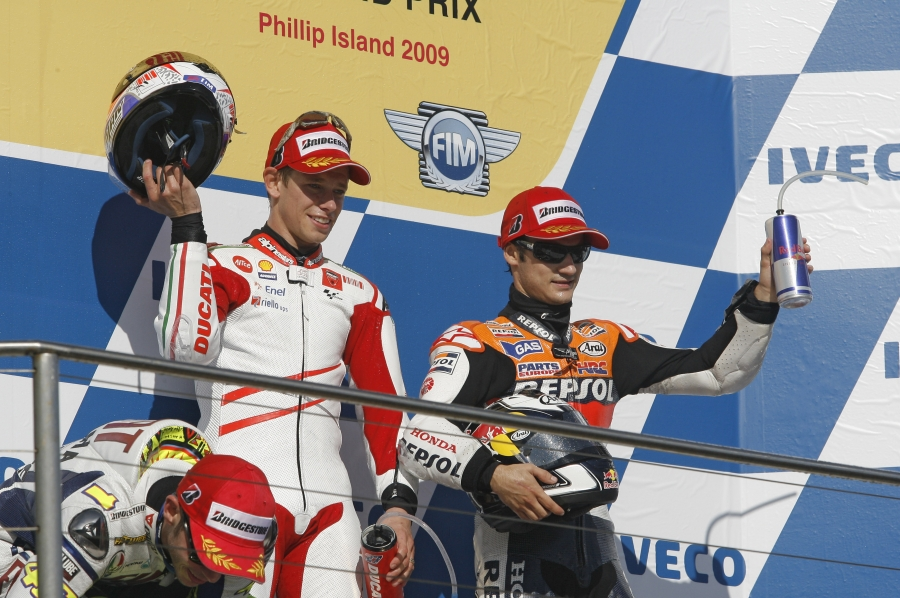
Valentino Rossi, Casey Stoner and Dani Pedrosa, celebrating on the podium after finishing second, first and third at the MotoGP race.

== MotoGP classification ==
Pos.	No.	Rider	Team	Manufacturer	Laps	Time/Retired	Grid	Points
1	27	(Australia) Casey Stoner	Ducati Marlboro Team	Ducati	27	40:56.651	1	25
2	46	(Italy) Valentino Rossi	Fiat Yamaha Team	Yamaha	27	+1.935	2	20
3	3	(Spain) Dani Pedrosa	Repsol Honda Team	Honda	27	+22.618	3	16
4	15	(San Marino) Alex de Angelis	San Carlo Honda Gresini	Honda	27	+32.702	6	13
5	5	(United States) Colin Edwards	Monster Yamaha Tech 3	Yamaha	27	+35.885	5	11
6	4	(Italy) Andrea Dovizioso	Repsol Honda Team	Honda	27	+38.482	10	10
7	33	(Italy) Marco Melandri	Hayate Racing Team	Kawasaki	27	+44.461	14	9
8	14	(France) Randy de Puniet	LCR Honda MotoGP	Honda	27	+44.941	8	8
9	36	(Finland) Mika Kallio	Pramac Racing	Ducati	27	+54.345	9	7
10	24	(Spain) Toni Elías	San Carlo Honda Gresini	Honda	27	+1:01.205	11	6
11	7	(Australia) Chris Vermeulen	Rizla Suzuki MotoGP	Suzuki	27	+1:05.417	15	5
12	65	(Italy) Loris Capirossi	Rizla Suzuki MotoGP	Suzuki	27	+1:05.950	17 (Note: Capirossi started at the back of the grid due to having a new engine, 1 over the allowed allocation.)	4
13	41	(Hungary) Gábor Talmácsi	Scot Racing Team MotoGP	Honda	27	+1:17.951	16	3
14	52	(United Kingdom) James Toseland	Monster Yamaha Tech 3	Yamaha	27	+1:17.985	12	2
15	69	(United States) Nicky Hayden	Ducati Marlboro Team	Ducati	26	+1 lap	7	1
Ret	99	(Spain) Jorge Lorenzo	Fiat Yamaha Team	Yamaha	0	Accident	4	
DNS	88	(Italy) Niccolò Canepa	Pramac Racing	Ducati		Did not start		

== 250 cc classification ==
The race, scheduled to be run for 25 laps, was stopped after 18 full laps due to Roberto Locatelli having an accident and did not restart as two-thirds of the race distance had been completed.

Pos.	No.	Rider	Manufacturer	Laps	Time/Retired	Grid	Points
1	58	(Italy) Marco Simoncelli	Gilera	18	28:17.403	2	25
2	40	(Spain) Héctor Barberá	Aprilia	18	+2.434	5	20
3	35	(Italy) Raffaele De Rosa	Honda	18	+2.604	1	16
4	16	(France) Jules Cluzel	Aprilia	18	+12.118	12	13
5	63	(France) Mike Di Meglio	Aprilia	18	+12.192	6	11
6	17	(Czech Republic) Karel Abraham	Aprilia	18	+12.413	11	10
7	4	(Japan) Hiroshi Aoyama	Honda	18	+12.455	3	9
8	55	(Spain) Héctor Faubel	Honda	18	+13.112	9	8
9	14	(Thailand) Ratthapark Wilairot	Honda	18	+13.560	7	7
10	19	(Spain) Álvaro Bautista	Aprilia	18	+27.779	10	6
11	12	(Switzerland) Thomas Lüthi	Aprilia	18	+28.222	15	5
12	52	(Czech Republic) Lukáš Pešek	Aprilia	18	+28.657	14	4
13	6	(Spain) Alex Debón	Aprilia	18	+33.892	4	3
14	73	(Japan) Shuhei Aoyama	Honda	18	+38.779	16	2
15	48	(Japan) Shoya Tomizawa	Honda	18	+40.529	18	1
16	11	(Hungary) Balázs Németh	Aprilia	18	+1:23.200	21	
17	8	(Switzerland) Bastien Chesaux	Aprilia	18	+1:24.298	24	
18	10	(Hungary) Imre Tóth	Aprilia	17	+1 lap	23	
19	53	(France) Valentin Debise	Honda	17	+1 lap	22	
NC	15	(Italy) Roberto Locatelli	Gilera	18	+30.515	17	
Ret	7	(Spain) Axel Pons	Aprilia	16	Retirement	19	
Ret	25	(Italy) Alex Baldolini	Aprilia	15	Retirement	13	
Ret	75	(Italy) Mattia Pasini	Aprilia	7	Accident	8	
Ret	56	(Russia) Vladimir Leonov	Aprilia	7	Retirement	20	
OFFICIAL 250cc REPORT

== 125 cc classification ==
Pos.	No.	Rider	Manufacturer	Laps	Time/Retired	Grid	Points
1	60	(Spain) Julián Simón	Aprilia	23	37:55.798	3	25
2	38	(United Kingdom) Bradley Smith	Aprilia	23	+0.313	5	20
3	11	(Germany) Sandro Cortese	Derbi	23	+2.057	7	16
4	44	(Spain) Pol Espargaró	Derbi	23	+2.161	1	13
5	24	(Italy) Simone Corsi	Aprilia	23	+2.330	4	11
6	18	(Spain) Nicolás Terol	Aprilia	23	+3.239	2	10
7	7	(Spain) Efrén Vázquez	Derbi	23	+3.290	11	9
8	29	(Italy) Andrea Iannone	Aprilia	23	+12.820	8	8
9	93	(Spain) Marc Márquez	KTM	23	+22.355	6	7
10	33	(Spain) Sergio Gadea	Aprilia	23	+22.602	16	6
11	45	(United Kingdom) Scott Redding	Aprilia	23	+29.181	24	5
12	77	(Switzerland) Dominique Aegerter	Derbi	23	+29.199	17	4
13	99	(United Kingdom) Danny Webb	Aprilia	23	+29.222	21	3
14	94	(Germany) Jonas Folger	Aprilia	23	+29.396	23	2
15	35	(Switzerland) Randy Krummenacher	Aprilia	23	+29.461	22	1
16	14	(France) Johann Zarco	Aprilia	23	+29.709	19	
17	8	(Italy) Lorenzo Zanetti	Aprilia	23	+31.251	13	
18	73	(Japan) Takaaki Nakagami	Aprilia	23	+32.482	14	
19	39	(Spain) Luis Salom	Aprilia	23	+58.333	25	
20	88	(Austria) Michael Ranseder	Aprilia	23	+58.485	20	
21	71	(Japan) Tomoyoshi Koyama	Loncin	23	+1:19.017	15	
22	53	(Netherlands) Jasper Iwema	Honda	23	+1:23.621	26	
23	21	(Czech Republic) Jakub Kornfeil	Loncin	23	+1:23.731	27	
24	97	(Australia) Brad Gross	Yamaha	22	+1 lap	29	
25	10	(Italy) Luca Vitali	Aprilia	22	+1 lap	28	
26	87	(Italy) Luca Marconi	Aprilia	22	+1 lap	31	
27	54	(Australia) Andrew Lawson	Honda	22	+1 lap	33	
Ret	98	(Australia) Levi Day	Honda	22	+1 lap	32	
Ret	12	(Spain) Esteve Rabat	Aprilia	21	Retirement	10	
Ret	96	(Australia) Nicky Diles	Aprilia	7	Retirement	30	
Ret	17	(Germany) Stefan Bradl	Aprilia	2	Accident	12	
Ret	6	(Spain) Joan Olivé	Derbi	2	Retirement	9	
Ret	16	(United States) Cameron Beaubier	KTM	2	Accident	18	
DNS	19	(France) Quentin Jacquet	Aprilia		Did not start		
DNS	30	(Australia) Dylan Mavin	Honda		Did not start		
OFFICIAL 125cc REPORT

== Championship standings after the race (MotoGP) ==
Below are the standings for the top five riders and constructors after round fifteen has concluded.

Riders' Championship standings

Pos.	Rider	Points
1	(Italy) Valentino Rossi	270
2	(Spain) Jorge Lorenzo	232
3	(Australia) Casey Stoner	195
4	(Spain) Dani Pedrosa	189
5	(Italy) Andrea Dovizioso	152

Constructors' Championship standings

Pos.	Constructor	Points
1	(Japan) Yamaha	350
2	(Japan) Honda	252
3	(Italy) Ducati	236
4	(Japan) Suzuki	121
5	(Japan) Kawasaki	100

- Note: Only the top five positions are included for both sets of standings.

Previous race: 2009 Portuguese Grand Prix	FIM Grand Prix World Championship; 2009 season	Next race: 2009 Malaysian Grand Prix
Previous race: 2008 Australian Grand Prix	Australian motorcycle Grand Prix	Next race: 2010 Australian Grand Prix
