= 2009 Portuguese motorcycle Grand Prix =

(Portugal) 2009 Portuguese Grand Prix
Race details
- Race 14 of 17 races in the 2009 Grand Prix motorcycle racing season
- Date: 4 October 2009
- Official name: bwin.com Grande Prémio de Portugal
- Location: Autódromo do Estoril
- Course: Permanent racing facility; 4.182 km (2.599 mi)

MotoGP
Pole position
- Rider: (Spain) Jorge Lorenzo
- Time: 1:36.214
Fastest lap
- Rider: (Spain) Dani Pedrosa
- Time: 1:36.937
Podium
- First: (Spain) Jorge Lorenzo
- Second: (Australia) Casey Stoner
- Third: (Spain) Dani Pedrosa

250cc
Pole position
- Rider: (Spain) Héctor Barberá
- Time: 1:40.596
Fastest lap
- Rider: (Italy) Marco Simoncelli
- Time: 1:40.863
Podium
- First: (Italy) Marco Simoncelli
- Second: (France) Mike Di Meglio
- Third: (Spain) Héctor Barberá

125cc
Pole position
- Rider: (Spain) Julián Simón
- Time: 1:45.199
Fastest lap
- Rider: (Germany) Sandro Cortese
- Time: 1:45.722
Podium
- First: (Spain) Pol Espargaró
- Second: (Germany) Sandro Cortese
- Third: (United Kingdom) Bradley Smith

The 2009 Portuguese motorcycle Grand Prix was the fourteenth round of the 2009 Grand Prix motorcycle racing season. It took place on the weekend of 2–4 October 2009 at the Autódromo do Estoril located in Estoril, Portugal. The MotoGP race was won by Jorge Lorenzo with Casey Stoner finishing second.

== MotoGP classification ==
Pos.	No.	Rider	Team	Manufacturer	Laps	Time/Retired	Grid	Points
1	99	(Spain) Jorge Lorenzo	Fiat Yamaha Team	Yamaha	28	45:35.522	1	25
2	27	(Australia) Casey Stoner	Ducati Marlboro Team	Ducati	28	+6.294	3	20
3	3	(Spain) Dani Pedrosa	Repsol Honda Team	Honda	28	+9.889	4	16
4	46	(Italy) Valentino Rossi	Fiat Yamaha Team	Yamaha	28	+23.428	2	13
5	5	(United States) Colin Edwards	Monster Yamaha Tech 3	Yamaha	28	+32.652	5	11
6	24	(Spain) Toni Elías	San Carlo Honda Gresini	Honda	28	+35.709	13	10
7	4	(Italy) Andrea Dovizioso	Repsol Honda Team	Honda	28	+35.723	8	9
8	69	(United States) Nicky Hayden	Ducati Marlboro Team	Ducati	28	+38.830	9	8
9	52	(United Kingdom) James Toseland	Monster Yamaha Tech 3	Yamaha	28	+44.093	12	7
10	7	(Australia) Chris Vermeulen	Rizla Suzuki MotoGP	Suzuki	28	+52.863	15	6
11	14	(France) Randy de Puniet	LCR Honda MotoGP	Honda	28	+55.698	6	5
12	33	(Italy) Marco Melandri	Hayate Racing Team	Kawasaki	28	+1:04.515	16	4
13	88	(Italy) Niccolò Canepa	Pramac Racing	Ducati	28	+1:04.538	14	3
14	41	(Hungary) Gábor Talmácsi	Scot Racing Team MotoGP	Honda	28	+1:27.299	17	2
Ret	65	(Italy) Loris Capirossi	Rizla Suzuki MotoGP	Suzuki	20	Retirement	7	
Ret	15	(San Marino) Alex de Angelis	San Carlo Honda Gresini	Honda	8	Retirement	11	
Ret	36	(Finland) Mika Kallio	Pramac Racing	Ducati	5	Accident	10	

== 250 cc classification ==
Pos.	No.	Rider	Manufacturer	Laps	Time/Retired	Grid	Points
1	58	(Italy) Marco Simoncelli	Gilera	26	44:04.298	3	25
2	63	(France) Mike Di Meglio	Aprilia	26	+5.317 (Note: Di Meglio was awarded 2nd place due to having a faster personal best lap than Barberá.)	10	20
3	40	(Spain) Héctor Barberá	Aprilia	26	+5.317	1	16
4	4	(Japan) Hiroshi Aoyama	Honda	26	+12.024	4	13
5	16	(France) Jules Cluzel	Aprilia	26	+14.349	9	11
6	14	(Thailand) Ratthapark Wilairot	Honda	26	+18.256	8	10
7	12	(Switzerland) Thomas Lüthi	Aprilia	26	+27.631	13	9
8	75	(Italy) Mattia Pasini	Aprilia	26	+34.667	7	8
9	6	(Spain) Alex Debón	Aprilia	26	+45.410	5	7
10	17	(Czech Republic) Karel Abraham	Aprilia	26	+45.891	12	6
11	52	(Czech Republic) Lukáš Pešek	Aprilia	26	+46.204	18	5
12	73	(Japan) Shuhei Aoyama	Honda	26	+57.641	15	4
13	53	(France) Valentin Debise	Honda	26	+1:21.309	19	3
14	25	(Italy) Alex Baldolini	Aprilia	26	+1:35.277	16	2
15	7	(Spain) Axel Pons	Aprilia	25	+1 lap	20	1
16	11	(Hungary) Balázs Németh	Aprilia	25	+1 lap	21	
17	8	(Switzerland) Bastien Chesaux	Aprilia	25	+1 lap	23	
18	10	(Hungary) Imre Tóth	Aprilia	25	+1 lap	25	
19	88	(Italy) Christopher Moretti	Aprilia	24	+2 laps	24	
Ret	56	(Russia) Vladimir Leonov	Aprilia	24	Accident	22	
Ret	48	(Japan) Shoya Tomizawa	Honda	12	Accident	17	
Ret	15	(Italy) Roberto Locatelli	Gilera	9	Accident	14	
Ret	35	(Italy) Raffaele De Rosa	Honda	7	Retirement	6	
Ret	19	(Spain) Álvaro Bautista	Aprilia	4	Accident	2	
Ret	55	(Spain) Héctor Faubel	Honda	4	Accident	11	
OFFICIAL 250cc REPORT

== 125 cc classification ==
Pos.	No.	Rider	Manufacturer	Laps	Time/Retired	Grid	Points
1	44	(Spain) Pol Espargaró	Derbi	23	41:00.421	2	25
2	11	(Germany) Sandro Cortese	Derbi	23	+0.394	7	20
3	38	(United Kingdom) Bradley Smith	Aprilia	23	+0.581	3	16
4	17	(Germany) Stefan Bradl	Aprilia	23	+11.048	5	13
5	6	(Spain) Joan Olivé	Derbi	23	+16.830	13	11
6	33	(Spain) Sergio Gadea	Aprilia	23	+17.170	11	10
7	12	(Spain) Esteve Rabat	Aprilia	23	+17.300	17	9
8	77	(Switzerland) Dominique Aegerter	Derbi	23	+17.546	15	8
9	14	(France) Johann Zarco	Aprilia	23	+17.666	16	7
10	35	(Switzerland) Randy Krummenacher	Aprilia	23	+21.378	18	6
11	73	(Japan) Takaaki Nakagami	Aprilia	23	+26.312	14	5
12	60	(Spain) Julián Simón	Aprilia	23	+31.500	1	4
13	8	(Italy) Lorenzo Zanetti	Aprilia	23	+34.194	22	3
14	94	(Germany) Jonas Folger	Aprilia	23	+35.023	19	2
15	39	(Spain) Luis Salom	Aprilia	23	+54.243	21	1
16	45	(United Kingdom) Scott Redding	Aprilia	23	+54.332	24	
17	53	(Netherlands) Jasper Iwema	Honda	23	+1:02.994	25	
18	42	(Spain) Alberto Moncayo	Aprilia	23	+1:03.054	23	
19	50	(Norway) Sturla Fagerhaug	KTM	23	+1:03.061	27	
20	43	(Spain) Johnny Rosell	Aprilia	23	+1:24.171	31	
21	70	(Slovakia) Jakub Jantulík	Aprilia	23	+1:37.379	33	
22	10	(Italy) Luca Vitali	Aprilia	23	+1:50.590	35	
23	19	(France) Quentin Jacquet	Aprilia	23	+1:50.852	32	
24	31	(Spain) Jordi Dalmau	Honda	22	+1 lap	34	
25	21	(Czech Republic) Jakub Kornfeil	Loncin	22	+1 lap	30	
Ret	99	(United Kingdom) Danny Webb	Aprilia	22	Retirement	10	
Ret	88	(Austria) Michael Ranseder	Aprilia	17	Accident	20	
Ret	87	(Italy) Luca Marconi	Aprilia	13	Retirement	29	
Ret	93	(Spain) Marc Márquez	KTM	12	Accident	4	
Ret	24	(Italy) Simone Corsi	Aprilia	9	Accident	8	
Ret	18	(Spain) Nicolás Terol	Aprilia	8	Retirement	6	
Ret	7	(Spain) Efrén Vázquez	Derbi	7	Accident	12	
Ret	16	(United States) Cameron Beaubier	KTM	4	Accident	26	
Ret	71	(Japan) Tomoyoshi Koyama	Loncin	3	Retirement	28	
Ret	29	(Italy) Andrea Iannone	Aprilia	2	Accident	9	
OFFICIAL 125cc REPORT

== Championship standings after the race (MotoGP) ==
Below are the standings for the top five riders and constructors after round fourteen has concluded.

Riders' Championship standings

Pos.	Rider	Points
1	(Italy) Valentino Rossi	250
2	(Spain) Jorge Lorenzo	232
3	(Spain) Dani Pedrosa	173
4	(Australia) Casey Stoner	170
5	(Italy) Andrea Dovizioso	142

Constructors' Championship standings

Pos.	Constructor	Points
1	(Japan) Yamaha	330
2	(Japan) Honda	236
3	(Italy) Ducati	211
4	(Japan) Suzuki	126
5	(Japan) Kawasaki	91

- Note: Only the top five positions are included for both sets of standings.

Previous race: 2009 San Marino Grand Prix	FIM Grand Prix World Championship; 2009 season	Next race: 2009 Australian Grand Prix
Previous race: 2008 Portuguese Grand Prix	Portuguese motorcycle Grand Prix	Next race: 2010 Portuguese Grand Prix
