= 2009 German motorcycle Grand Prix =

(Germany) 2009 German Grand Prix
Race details
- Race 9 of 17 races in the 2009 Grand Prix motorcycle racing season
- Date: 19 July 2009
- Official name: Alice Motorrad Grand Prix Deutschland
- Location: Sachsenring
- Course: Permanent racing facility; 3.671 km (2.281 mi)

MotoGP
Pole position
- Rider: (Italy) Valentino Rossi
- Time: 1:32.520
Fastest lap
- Rider: (Spain) Dani Pedrosa
- Time: 1:22.126
Podium
- First: (Italy) Valentino Rossi
- Second: (Spain) Jorge Lorenzo
- Third: (Spain) Dani Pedrosa

250cc
Pole position
- Rider: (Italy) Marco Simoncelli
- Time: 1:32.962
Fastest lap
- Rider: (Spain) Álvaro Bautista
- Time: 1:24.552
Podium
- First: (Italy) Marco Simoncelli
- Second: (Spain) Alex Debón
- Third: (Spain) Álvaro Bautista

125cc
Pole position
- Rider: (Spain) Julián Simón
- Time: 1:38.671
Fastest lap
- Rider: (Spain) Sergio Gadea
- Time: 1:28.337
Podium
- First: (Spain) Julián Simón
- Second: (Spain) Sergio Gadea
- Third: (Spain) Joan Olivé

The 2009 German motorcycle Grand Prix was the ninth round of the 2009 Grand Prix motorcycle racing season. It took place on the weekend of 17–19 July 2009 at the Sachsenring, located in Hohenstein-Ernstthal, Germany.

The MotoGP race was won by Valentino Rossi who finished ahead of teammate Jorge Lorenzo.

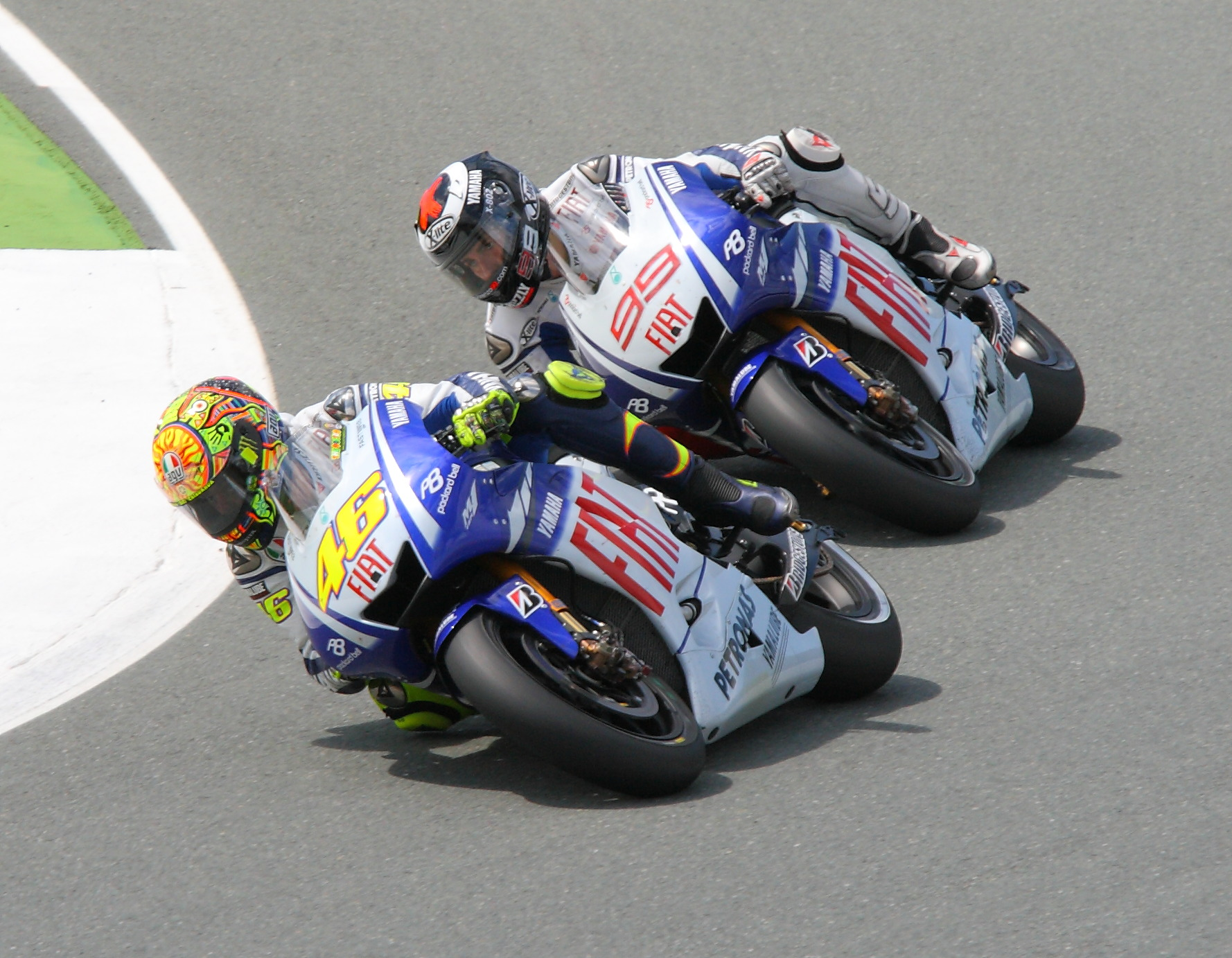
Valentino Rossi and Jorge Lorenzo, battling for the lead of the MotoGP race. Rossi went on to win, with Lorenzo finishing second.

== MotoGP classification ==
Pos.	No.	Rider	Team	Manufacturer	Laps	Time/Retired	Grid	Points
1	46	(Italy) Valentino Rossi	Fiat Yamaha Team	Yamaha	30	41:21.769	1	25
2	99	(Spain) Jorge Lorenzo	Fiat Yamaha Team	Yamaha	30	+0.099	2	20
3	3	(Spain) Dani Pedrosa	Repsol Honda Team	Honda	30	+2.899	8	16
4	27	(Australia) Casey Stoner	Ducati Marlboro Team	Ducati	30	+10.226	3	13
5	15	(San Marino) Alex de Angelis	San Carlo Honda Gresini	Honda	30	+21.522	5	11
6	24	(Spain) Toni Elías	San Carlo Honda Gresini	Honda	30	+30.852	17	10
7	33	(Italy) Marco Melandri	Hayate Racing Team	Kawasaki	30	+31.301	13	9
8	69	(United States) Nicky Hayden	Ducati Marlboro Team	Ducati	30	+31.726	4	8
9	5	(United States) Colin Edwards	Monster Yamaha Tech 3	Yamaha	30	+32.865	7	7
10	52	(United Kingdom) James Toseland	Monster Yamaha Tech 3	Yamaha	30	+43.926	14	6
11	65	(Italy) Loris Capirossi	Rizla Suzuki MotoGP	Suzuki	30	+57.375	9	5
12	88	(Italy) Niccolò Canepa	Pramac Racing	Ducati	30	+1:00.539	15	4
13	7	(Australia) Chris Vermeulen	Rizla Suzuki MotoGP	Suzuki	30	+1:03.645	12	3
14	36	(Finland) Mika Kallio	Pramac Racing	Ducati	30	+1:04.155	10	2
15	41	(Hungary) Gábor Talmácsi	Scot Racing Team MotoGP	Honda	29	+1 lap	16	1
Ret	4	(Italy) Andrea Dovizioso	Repsol Honda Team	Honda	25	Retirement	11	
Ret	14	(France) Randy de Puniet	LCR Honda MotoGP	Honda	0	Accident	6	

== 250 cc classification ==
The 250cc race was originally scheduled to run for 29 laps, but due to heavy rain it was red-flagged and then restarted, with the new distance consisting of 19 laps only.

Pos.	No.	Rider	Manufacturer	Laps	Time/Retired	Grid	Points
1	58	(Italy) Marco Simoncelli	Gilera	19	27:11.034	1	25
2	6	(Spain) Alex Debón	Aprilia	19	+0.479	7	20
3	19	(Spain) Álvaro Bautista	Aprilia	19	+0.528	3	16
4	4	(Japan) Hiroshi Aoyama	Honda	19	+0.866	4	13
5	40	(Spain) Héctor Barberá	Aprilia	19	+1.260	2	11
6	55	(Spain) Héctor Faubel	Honda	19	+5.972	8	10
7	41	(Spain) Aleix Espargaró	Aprilia	19	+8.721	9	9
8	12	(Switzerland) Thomas Lüthi	Aprilia	19	+8.762	11	8
9	35	(Italy) Raffaele De Rosa	Honda	19	+19.176	17	7
10	15	(Italy) Roberto Locatelli	Gilera	19	+27.950	14	6
11	25	(Italy) Alex Baldolini	Aprilia	19	+29.601	12	5
12	52	(Czech Republic) Lukáš Pešek	Aprilia	19	+38.299	13	4
13	48	(Japan) Shoya Tomizawa	Honda	19	+51.940	18	3
14	16	(France) Jules Cluzel	Aprilia	19	+52.919	15	2
15	8	(Switzerland) Bastien Chesaux	Honda	19	+1:06.786	23	1
16	7	(Spain) Axel Pons	Aprilia	19	+1:20.573	24	
17	54	(United Kingdom) Toby Markham	Aprilia	18	+1 lap	22	
18	10	(Hungary) Imre Tóth	Aprilia	18	+1 lap	19	
19	66	(Sweden) Joakim Stensmo	Honda	17	+2 laps	25	
20	53	(France) Valentin Debise	Honda	15	+4 laps	21	
Ret	75	(Italy) Mattia Pasini	Aprilia	16	Accident	6	
Ret	63	(France) Mike Di Meglio	Aprilia	16	Accident	10	
Ret	17	(Czech Republic) Karel Abraham	Aprilia	8	Retirement	5	
Ret	56	(Russia) Vladimir Leonov	Aprilia	0	Accident	20	
DNS	14	(Thailand) Ratthapark Wilairot	Honda	0	Did not restart	16	
DNQ	67	(Sweden) Robin Hålén	Aprilia		Did not qualify		
DNQ	65	(Germany) Marcel Becker	Yamaha		Did not qualify		
OFFICIAL 250cc REPORT

== 125 cc classification ==
Pos.	No.	Rider	Manufacturer	Laps	Time/Retired	Grid	Points
1	60	(Spain) Julián Simón	Aprilia	27	39:57.337	1	25
2	33	(Spain) Sergio Gadea	Aprilia	27	+9.415	14	20
3	6	(Spain) Joan Olivé	Derbi	27	+17.559	12	16
4	18	(Spain) Nicolás Terol	Aprilia	27	+17.587	5	13
5	44	(Spain) Pol Espargaró	Derbi	27	+19.740	19	11
6	11	(Germany) Sandro Cortese	Derbi	27	+20.778	15	10
7	29	(Italy) Andrea Iannone	Aprilia	27	+20.908	22	9
8	99	(United Kingdom) Danny Webb	Aprilia	27	+38.221	17	8
9	77	(Switzerland) Dominique Aegerter	Derbi	27	+38.434	23	7
10	71	(Japan) Tomoyoshi Koyama	Loncin	27	+40.085	13	6
11	35	(Switzerland) Randy Krummenacher	Aprilia	27	+44.127	33	5
12	78	(Germany) Marcel Schrötter	Honda	27	+45.051	4	4
13	39	(Spain) Luis Salom	Aprilia	27	+59.604	30	3
14	16	(United States) Cameron Beaubier	KTM	27	+1:18.157	28	2
15	79	(Germany) Daniel Kartheininger	Honda	27	+1:20.825	26	1
16	93	(Spain) Marc Márquez	KTM	27	+1:25.137	3	
17	7	(Spain) Efrén Vázquez	Derbi	27	+1:30.427	8	
18	69	(Czech Republic) Lukáš Šembera	Aprilia	27	+1:30.528	20	
19	53	(Netherlands) Jasper Iwema	Honda	26	+1 lap	11	
20	32	(Italy) Lorenzo Savadori	Aprilia	26	+1 lap	25	
21	76	(Germany) Toni Finsterbusch	Honda	26	+1 lap	29	
22	80	(Switzerland) Damien Raemy	Honda	26	+1 lap	35	
23	14	(France) Johann Zarco	Aprilia	26	+1 lap	34	
24	87	(Italy) Luca Marconi	Aprilia	26	+1 lap	32	
Ret	45	(United Kingdom) Scott Redding	Aprilia	19	Retirement	24	
Ret	17	(Germany) Stefan Bradl	Aprilia	18	Accident	16	
Ret	73	(Japan) Takaaki Nakagami	Aprilia	17	Retirement	7	
Ret	24	(Italy) Simone Corsi	Aprilia	16	Retirement	9	
Ret	94	(Germany) Jonas Folger	Aprilia	15	Accident	21	
Ret	88	(Austria) Michael Ranseder	Aprilia	8	Accident	10	
Ret	8	(Italy) Lorenzo Zanetti	Aprilia	6	Retirement	18	
Ret	81	(Finland) Eeki Kuparinen	Honda	3	Accident	31	
Ret	38	(United Kingdom) Bradley Smith	Aprilia	3	Accident	2	
Ret	12	(Spain) Esteve Rabat	Aprilia	1	Accident	27	
Ret	5	(France) Alexis Masbou	Loncin	1	Accident	6	
DNQ	10	(Italy) Luca Vitali	Aprilia		Did not qualify		
OFFICIAL 125cc REPORT

== Championship standings after the race (MotoGP) ==
Below are the standings for the top five riders and constructors after round nine has concluded.

Riders' Championship standings

Pos.	Rider	Points
1	(Italy) Valentino Rossi	176
2	(Spain) Jorge Lorenzo	162
3	(Australia) Casey Stoner	148
4	(Spain) Dani Pedrosa	108
5	(United States) Colin Edwards	83

Constructors' Championship standings

Pos.	Constructor	Points
1	(Japan) Yamaha	210
2	(Italy) Ducati	148
3	(Japan) Honda	139
4	(Japan) Suzuki	84
5	(Japan) Kawasaki	70

- Note: Only the top five positions are included for both sets of standings.

Previous race: 2009 United States Grand Prix	FIM Grand Prix World Championship; 2009 season	Next race: 2009 British Grand Prix
Previous race: 2008 German Grand Prix	German motorcycle Grand Prix	Next race: 2010 German Grand Prix
