= 2009 Malaysian motorcycle Grand Prix =

(Malaysia) 2009 Malaysian Grand Prix
Race details
- Race 16 of 17 races in the 2009 Grand Prix motorcycle racing season
- Date: 25 October 2009
- Official name: Shell Advance Malaysian Motorcycle Grand Prix
- Location: Sepang International Circuit
- Course: Permanent racing facility; 5.543 km (3.444 mi)

MotoGP
Pole position
- Rider: (Italy) Valentino Rossi
- Time: 2:00.518
Fastest lap
- Rider: (Italy) Valentino Rossi
- Time: 2:13.694
Podium
- First: (Australia) Casey Stoner
- Second: (Spain) Dani Pedrosa
- Third: (Italy) Valentino Rossi

250cc
Pole position
- Rider: (Japan) Hiroshi Aoyama
- Time: 2:06.767
Fastest lap
- Rider: (Japan) Hiroshi Aoyama
- Time: 2:07.597
Podium
- First: (Japan) Hiroshi Aoyama
- Second: (Spain) Héctor Barberá
- Third: (Italy) Marco Simoncelli

125cc
Pole position
- Rider: (Spain) Marc Márquez
- Time: 2:13.756
Fastest lap
- Rider: (United Kingdom) Bradley Smith
- Time: 2:14.068
Podium
- First: (Spain) Julián Simón
- Second: (United Kingdom) Bradley Smith
- Third: (Spain) Pol Espargaró

The 2009 Malaysian motorcycle Grand Prix was the sixteenth round of the 2009 Grand Prix motorcycle racing season. It took place on the weekend of 23–25 October 2009 at the Sepang International Circuit. In wet conditions the race was dominated by Casey Stoner in a return to form following a mystery illness which ended his hopes of regaining the world championship title. Valentino Rossi finished third, which clinched the 2009 MotoGP championship for him.

== MotoGP classification ==
Pos.	No.	Rider	Team	Manufacturer	Laps	Time/Retired	Grid	Points
1	27	(Australia) Casey Stoner	Ducati Marlboro Team	Ducati	21	47:24.834	4	25
2	3	(Spain) Dani Pedrosa	Repsol Honda Team	Honda	21	+14.666	3	20
3	46	(Italy) Valentino Rossi	Fiat Yamaha Team	Yamaha	21	+19.385	1	16
4	99	(Spain) Jorge Lorenzo	Fiat Yamaha Team	Yamaha	21	+25.850	2	13
5	69	(United States) Nicky Hayden	Ducati Marlboro Team	Ducati	21	+38.705	7	11
6	7	(Australia) Chris Vermeulen	Rizla Suzuki MotoGP	Suzuki	21	+41.061	14	10
7	24	(Spain) Toni Elías	San Carlo Honda Gresini	Honda	21	+48.555	6	9
8	33	(Italy) Marco Melandri	Hayate Racing Team	Kawasaki	21	+55.557	15	8
9	65	(Italy) Loris Capirossi	Rizla Suzuki MotoGP	Suzuki	21	+1:00.303	5	7
10	36	(Finland) Mika Kallio	Pramac Racing	Ducati	21	+1:00.440	12	6
11	44	(Spain) Aleix Espargaró	Pramac Racing	Ducati	21	+1:01.655	13	5
12	15	(San Marino) Alex de Angelis	San Carlo Honda Gresini	Honda	21	+1:01.847	10	4
13	5	(United States) Colin Edwards	Monster Yamaha Tech 3	Yamaha	21	+1:10.778	9	3
14	41	(Hungary) Gábor Talmácsi	Scot Racing Team MotoGP	Honda	21	+1:15.851	17	2
15	52	(United Kingdom) James Toseland	Monster Yamaha Tech 3	Yamaha	21	+1:50.672	16	1
Ret	4	(Italy) Andrea Dovizioso	Repsol Honda Team	Honda	14	Accident	11	
Ret	14	(France) Randy de Puniet	LCR Honda MotoGP	Honda	1	Accident	8	

== 250 cc classification ==
Pos.	No.	Rider	Manufacturer	Laps	Time/Retired	Grid	Points
1	4	(Japan) Hiroshi Aoyama	Honda	20	42:55.689	1	25
2	40	(Spain) Héctor Barberá	Aprilia	20	+6.397 (Note: Barberá was awarded 2nd place due to having a faster personal best lap than Simoncelli.)	4	20
3	58	(Italy) Marco Simoncelli	Gilera	20	+6.397	8	16
4	12	(Switzerland) Thomas Lüthi	Aprilia	20	+14.871	9	13
5	55	(Spain) Héctor Faubel	Honda	20	+19.177	7	11
6	14	(Thailand) Ratthapark Wilairot	Honda	20	+19.567	6	10
7	6	(Spain) Alex Debón	Aprilia	20	+20.255	11	9
8	52	(Czech Republic) Lukáš Pešek	Aprilia	20	+34.561	17	8
9	25	(Italy) Alex Baldolini	Aprilia	20	+50.937	14	7
10	73	(Japan) Shuhei Aoyama	Honda	20	+1:04.186	19	6
11	11	(Hungary) Balázs Németh	Aprilia	20	+1:08.917	20	5
12	17	(Czech Republic) Karel Abraham	Aprilia	20	+1:10.616	15	4
13	53	(France) Valentin Debise	Honda	20	+1:17.945	22	3
14	8	(Switzerland) Bastien Chesaux	Aprilia	20	+1:29.669	21	2
15	56	(Russia) Vladimir Leonov	Aprilia	20	+1:43.536	23	1
16	48	(Japan) Shoya Tomizawa	Honda	19	+1 lap	16	
Ret	35	(Italy) Raffaele De Rosa	Honda	16	Retirement	10	
Ret	16	(France) Jules Cluzel	Aprilia	11	Retirement	2	
Ret	75	(Italy) Mattia Pasini	Aprilia	11	Retirement	12	
Ret	63	(France) Mike Di Meglio	Aprilia	8	Retirement	3	
Ret	19	(Spain) Álvaro Bautista	Aprilia	6	Retirement	5	
Ret	15	(Italy) Roberto Locatelli	Gilera	5	Accident	13	
Ret	7	(Spain) Axel Pons	Aprilia	2	Accident	18	
Ret	10	(Hungary) Imre Tóth	Aprilia	1	Retirement	24	
OFFICIAL 250cc REPORT

== 125 cc classification ==
Pos.	No.	Rider	Manufacturer	Laps	Time/Retired	Grid	Points
1	60	(Spain) Julián Simón	Aprilia	19	42:50.916	2	25
2	38	(United Kingdom) Bradley Smith	Aprilia	19	+1.114	3	20
3	44	(Spain) Pol Espargaró	Derbi	19	+6.293	11	16
4	33	(Spain) Sergio Gadea	Aprilia	19	+8.003	18	13
5	18	(Spain) Nicolás Terol	Aprilia	19	+8.485	5	11
6	11	(Germany) Sandro Cortese	Derbi	19	+10.188	4	10
7	12	(Spain) Esteve Rabat	Aprilia	19	+15.114	6	9
8	29	(Italy) Andrea Iannone	Aprilia	19	+22.151	13	8
9	6	(Spain) Joan Olivé	Derbi	19	+26.388	7	7
10	8	(Italy) Lorenzo Zanetti	Aprilia	19	+27.113	14	6
11	73	(Japan) Takaaki Nakagami	Aprilia	19	+27.859	15	5
12	88	(Austria) Michael Ranseder	Aprilia	19	+34.838	23	4
13	35	(Switzerland) Randy Krummenacher	Aprilia	19	+41.829	12	3
14	77	(Switzerland) Dominique Aegerter	Derbi	19	+42.433	21	2
15	39	(Spain) Luis Salom	Aprilia	19	+51.635	20	1
16	28	(Malaysia) Elly Ilias	Aprilia	19	+59.854	25	
17	16	(United States) Cameron Beaubier	KTM	19	+1:07.131	24	
18	53	(Netherlands) Jasper Iwema	Honda	19	+1:14.171	27	
19	21	(Czech Republic) Jakub Kornfeil	Loncin	19	+1:27.651	28	
20	23	(Malaysia) Muhammad Zulfahmi	Yamaha	19	+1:58.779	30	
21	47	(Australia) Blake Leigh-Smith	Honda	19	+2:06.062	29	
22	19	(France) Quentin Jacquet	Aprilia	18	+1 lap	33	
Ret	24	(Italy) Simone Corsi	Aprilia	17	Accident	16	
Ret	14	(France) Johann Zarco	Aprilia	17	Accident	22	
Ret	7	(Spain) Efrén Vázquez	Derbi	17	Retirement	9	
Ret	87	(Italy) Luca Marconi	Aprilia	14	Retirement	31	
Ret	10	(Italy) Luca Vitali	Aprilia	13	Retirement	32	
Ret	93	(Spain) Marc Márquez	KTM	12	Retirement	1	
Ret	45	(United Kingdom) Scott Redding	Aprilia	10	Retirement	17	
Ret	94	(Germany) Jonas Folger	Aprilia	10	Retirement	10	
Ret	71	(Japan) Tomoyoshi Koyama	Loncin	2	Retirement	26	
Ret	17	(Germany) Stefan Bradl	Aprilia	0	Accident	19	
Ret	99	(United Kingdom) Danny Webb	Aprilia	0	Accident	8	
OFFICIAL 125cc REPORT

== Championship standings after the race (MotoGP) ==
Below are the standings for the top five riders and constructors after round sixteen has concluded.

Riders' Championship standings

Pos.	Rider	Points
1	(Italy) Valentino Rossi	286
2	(Spain) Jorge Lorenzo	245
3	(Australia) Casey Stoner	220
4	(Spain) Dani Pedrosa	209
5	(Italy) Andrea Dovizioso	152

Constructors' Championship standings

Pos.	Constructor	Points
1	(Japan) Yamaha	366
2	(Japan) Honda	272
3	(Italy) Ducati	261
4	(Japan) Suzuki	131
5	(Japan) Kawasaki	108

- Note: Only the top five positions are included for both sets of standings.

Previous race: 2009 Australian Grand Prix	FIM Grand Prix World Championship; 2009 season	Next race: 2009 Valencian Grand Prix
Previous race: 2008 Malaysian Grand Prix	Malaysian motorcycle Grand Prix	Next race: 2010 Malaysian Grand Prix
