= 2009 Valencian Community motorcycle Grand Prix =

Grand Prix in 2009

2009 Valencian Community Grand Prix
Race details
- Race 17 of 17 races in the 2009 Grand Prix motorcycle racing season
- Date: 8 November 2009
- Official name: Gran Premio Generali de la Comunitat Valenciana
- Location: Circuit Ricardo Tormo
- Course: Permanent racing facility; 4.005 km (2.489 mi)

MotoGP
Pole position
- Rider: (Australia) Casey Stoner
- Time: 1:32.256
Fastest lap
- Rider: (Spain) Dani Pedrosa
- Time: 1:32.778
Podium
- First: (Spain) Dani Pedrosa
- Second: (Italy) Valentino Rossi
- Third: (Spain) Jorge Lorenzo

250cc
Pole position
- Rider: (Spain) Alex Debón
- Time: 1:36.116
Fastest lap
- Rider: (Spain) Héctor Barberá
- Time: 1:36.866
Podium
- First: (Spain) Héctor Barberá
- Second: (Spain) Álvaro Bautista
- Third: (Italy) Raffaele De Rosa

125cc
Pole position
- Rider: (Spain) Julián Simón
- Time: 1:41.472
Fastest lap
- Rider: (Spain) Julián Simón
- Time: 1:41.650
Podium
- First: (Spain) Julián Simón
- Second: (United Kingdom) Bradley Smith
- Third: (Spain) Pol Espargaró

The 2009 Valencian Community motorcycle Grand Prix was the last round of the 2009 Grand Prix motorcycle racing season. It took place on the weekend of 6–8 November 2009 at the Circuit Ricardo Tormo. It was the final race of the 250cc two-stroke class, as Moto2 (600cc four-stroke) replaced it from 2010 onwards. The MotoGP race was won by Dani Pedrosa.

== MotoGP classification ==
Pos.	No.	Rider	Team	Manufacturer	Laps	Time/Retired	Grid	Points
1	3	(Spain) Dani Pedrosa	Repsol Honda Team	Honda	30	46:47.553	2	25
2	46	(Italy) Valentino Rossi	Fiat Yamaha Team	Yamaha	30	+2.630	4	20
3	99	(Spain) Jorge Lorenzo	Fiat Yamaha Team	Yamaha	30	+2.913	3	16
4	5	(United States) Colin Edwards	Monster Yamaha Tech 3	Yamaha	30	+32.515	5	13
5	69	(United States) Nicky Hayden	Ducati Marlboro Team	Ducati	30	+34.585	6	11
6	24	(Spain) Toni Elías	San Carlo Honda Gresini	Honda	30	+34.888	8	10
7	11	(United States) Ben Spies	Sterilgarda Yamaha Team	Yamaha	30	+37.706	9	9
8	4	(Italy) Andrea Dovizioso	Repsol Honda Team	Honda	30	+38.364	10	8
9	36	(Finland) Mika Kallio	Pramac Racing	Ducati	30	+42.491	11	7
10	15	(San Marino) Alex de Angelis	San Carlo Honda Gresini	Honda	30	+43.689	12	6
11	14	(France) Randy de Puniet	LCR Honda MotoGP	Honda	30	+46.018	7	5
12	52	(United Kingdom) James Toseland	Monster Yamaha Tech 3	Yamaha	30	+50.226	14	4
13	44	(Spain) Aleix Espargaró	Pramac Racing	Ducati	30	+57.168	16	3
14	65	(Italy) Loris Capirossi	Rizla Suzuki MotoGP	Suzuki	30	+1:06.877	13	2
15	7	(Australia) Chris Vermeulen	Rizla Suzuki MotoGP	Suzuki	30	+1:11.701	18	1
16	41	(Hungary) Gábor Talmácsi	Scot Racing Team MotoGP	Honda	30	+1:14.405	17	
17	33	(Italy) Marco Melandri	Hayate Racing Team	Kawasaki	30	+1:33.425	15	
DNS	27	(Australia) Casey Stoner	Ducati Marlboro Team	Ducati	0	Accident in the warm-up lap	1^{1}	
Sources:

- ^1 – Casey Stoner did not start the race. His place on the grid was left vacant.

== 250 cc classification ==
Alex Debón was due to start on pole position, but due to injuries sustained in qualifying practice he did not take part in the race. Therefore, everyone else was moved up one place on the final starting grid.

Pos.	No.	Rider	Manufacturer	Laps	Time/Retired	Grid	Points
1	40	(Spain) Héctor Barberá	Aprilia	27	44:10.601	2	25
2	19	(Spain) Álvaro Bautista	Aprilia	27	+3.663	8	20
3	35	(Italy) Raffaele De Rosa	Honda	27	+5.665	10	16
4	12	(Switzerland) Thomas Lüthi	Aprilia	27	+5.680	5	13
5	14	(Thailand) Ratthapark Wilairot	Honda	27	+13.601	3	11
6	17	(Czech Republic) Karel Abraham	Aprilia	27	+13.697	6	10
7	4	(Japan) Hiroshi Aoyama	Honda	27	+27.438	4	9
8	25	(Italy) Alex Baldolini	Aprilia	27	+35.097	11	8
9	15	(Italy) Roberto Locatelli	Gilera	27	+35.866	13	7
10	48	(Japan) Shoya Tomizawa	Honda	27	+40.176	15	6
11	73	(Japan) Shuhei Aoyama	Honda	27	+49.095	19	5
12	52	(Czech Republic) Lukáš Pešek	Aprilia	27	+53.132	17	4
13	11	(Hungary) Balázs Németh	Aprilia	27	+1:06.014	18	3
14	63	(France) Mike Di Meglio	Aprilia	27	+1:18.692	14	2
15	53	(France) Valentin Debise	Honda	27	+1:18.876	20	1
16	8	(Switzerland) Bastien Chesaux	Aprilia	26	+1 lap	22	
17	56	(Russia) Vladimir Leonov	Aprilia	26	+1 lap	21	
18	33	(Republic of Ireland) William Dunlop	Honda	26	+1 lap	24	
19	10	(Hungary) Imre Tóth	Aprilia	26	+1 lap	23	
Ret	16	(France) Jules Cluzel	Aprilia	23	Accident	12	
Ret	58	(Italy) Marco Simoncelli	Gilera	20	Accident	1	
Ret	7	(Spain) Axel Pons	Aprilia	19	Retirement	16	
Ret	75	(Italy) Mattia Pasini	Aprilia	11	Retirement	7	
Ret	55	(Spain) Héctor Faubel	Honda	7	Accident	9	
DNS	6	(Spain) Alex Debón	Aprilia		Injured		
OFFICIAL 250cc REPORT

== 125 cc classification ==
Pos.	No.	Rider	Manufacturer	Laps	Time/Retired	Grid	Points
1	60	(Spain) Julián Simón	Aprilia	24	41:17.553	1	25
2	38	(United Kingdom) Bradley Smith	Aprilia	24	+0.220	3	20
3	44	(Spain) Pol Espargaró	Derbi	24	+12.123	8	16
4	24	(Italy) Simone Corsi	Aprilia	24	+17.577	2	13
5	78	(Germany) Marcel Schrötter	Honda	24	+17.917	7	11
6	6	(Spain) Joan Olivé	Derbi	24	+18.334	5	10
7	7	(Spain) Efrén Vázquez	Derbi	24	+18.502	12	9
8	11	(Germany) Sandro Cortese	Derbi	24	+18.553	10	8
9	35	(Switzerland) Randy Krummenacher	Aprilia	24	+18.731	15	7
10	18	(Spain) Nicolás Terol	Aprilia	24	+21.280	6	6
11	77	(Switzerland) Dominique Aegerter	Derbi	24	+23.635	19	5
12	8	(Italy) Lorenzo Zanetti	Aprilia	24	+34.369	22	4
13	39	(Spain) Luis Salom	Aprilia	24	+37.950	24	3
14	73	(Japan) Takaaki Nakagami	Aprilia	24	+38.090	18	2
15	14	(France) Johann Zarco	Aprilia	24	+40.043	21	1
16	33	(Spain) Sergio Gadea	Aprilia	24	+44.478	14	
17	93	(Spain) Marc Márquez	KTM	24	+58.437	4	
18	53	(Netherlands) Jasper Iwema	Honda	24	+1:03.814	25	
19	42	(Spain) Alberto Moncayo	Aprilia	24	+1:08.362	33	
20	71	(Japan) Tomoyoshi Koyama	Loncin	24	+1:24.971	28	
21	87	(Italy) Luca Marconi	Aprilia	23	+1 lap	32	
Ret	16	(United States) Cameron Beaubier	KTM	23	Accident	17	
Ret	10	(Italy) Luca Vitali	Aprilia	21	Accident	34	
Ret	94	(Germany) Jonas Folger	Aprilia	17	Retirement	20	
Ret	76	(Spain) Iván Maestro	Aprilia	11	Retirement	31	
Ret	21	(Czech Republic) Jakub Kornfeil	Loncin	9	Accident	30	
Ret	17	(Germany) Stefan Bradl	Aprilia	8	Accident	16	
Ret	32	(Italy) Lorenzo Savadori	Aprilia	6	Accident	27	
Ret	12	(Spain) Esteve Rabat	Aprilia	5	Accident	11	
Ret	45	(United Kingdom) Scott Redding	Aprilia	5	Accident	9	
Ret	50	(Norway) Sturla Fagerhaug	KTM	4	Accident	29	
Ret	88	(Austria) Michael Ranseder	Aprilia	3	Retirement	23	
Ret	29	(Italy) Andrea Iannone	Aprilia	1	Retirement	13	
DNS	95	(Spain) Joan Perelló	Honda	0	Did not start	26	
DNS	99	(United Kingdom) Danny Webb	Aprilia		Did not start		
DNQ	19	(France) Quentin Jacquet	Aprilia		Did not qualify		
OFFICIAL 125cc REPORT

== Championship standings after the race (MotoGP) ==
Below are the standings for the top five riders and constructors after round seventeen has concluded.

Riders' Championship standings

Pos.	Rider	Points
1	(Italy) Valentino Rossi	306
2	(Spain) Jorge Lorenzo	261
3	(Spain) Dani Pedrosa	234
4	(Australia) Casey Stoner	220
5	(United States) Colin Edwards	161

Constructors' Championship standings

Pos.	Constructor	Points
1	(Japan) Yamaha	386
2	(Japan) Honda	297
3	(Italy) Ducati	272
4	(Japan) Suzuki	133
5	(Japan) Kawasaki	108

- Note: Only the top five positions are included for both sets of standings.

Previous race: 2009 Malaysian Grand Prix	FIM Grand Prix World Championship; 2009 season	Next race: 2010 Qatar Grand Prix
Previous race: 2008 Valencian Grand Prix	Valencian Community motorcycle Grand Prix	Next race: 2010 Valencian Grand Prix
