= 2009 Catalan motorcycle Grand Prix =

(Catalonia) 2009 Catalan Grand Prix
Race details
- Race 6 of 17 races in the 2009 Grand Prix motorcycle racing season
- Date: 14 June 2009
- Official name: Gran Premi Cinzano de Catalunya
- Location: Circuit de Catalunya
- Course: Permanent racing facility; 4.727 km (2.937 mi)

MotoGP
Pole position
- Rider: (Spain) Jorge Lorenzo
- Time: 1:41.974
Fastest lap
- Rider: (Australia) Casey Stoner
- Time: 1:42.858
Podium
- First: (Italy) Valentino Rossi
- Second: (Spain) Jorge Lorenzo
- Third: (Australia) Casey Stoner

250cc
Pole position
- Rider: (Spain) Héctor Barberá
- Time: 1:46.749
Fastest lap
- Rider: (Spain) Álvaro Bautista
- Time: 1:46.656
Podium
- First: (Spain) Álvaro Bautista
- Second: (Japan) Hiroshi Aoyama
- Third: (Spain) Héctor Barberá

125cc
Pole position
- Rider: (Spain) Julián Simón
- Time: 1:51.448
Fastest lap
- Rider: (Spain) Marc Márquez
- Time: 1:51.175
Podium
- First: (Italy) Andrea Iannone
- Second: (Spain) Nicolás Terol
- Third: (Spain) Sergio Gadea

The 2009 Catalan motorcycle Grand Prix was the sixth round of the 2009 Grand Prix motorcycle racing season. It took place on the weekend of 12–14 June 2009 at the Circuit de Catalunya. This race is known as one of the most thrilling in MotoGP history, because Valentino Rossi held off the challenge of teammate Jorge Lorenzo by overtaking him in the last corner, on the last lap, to win the race.

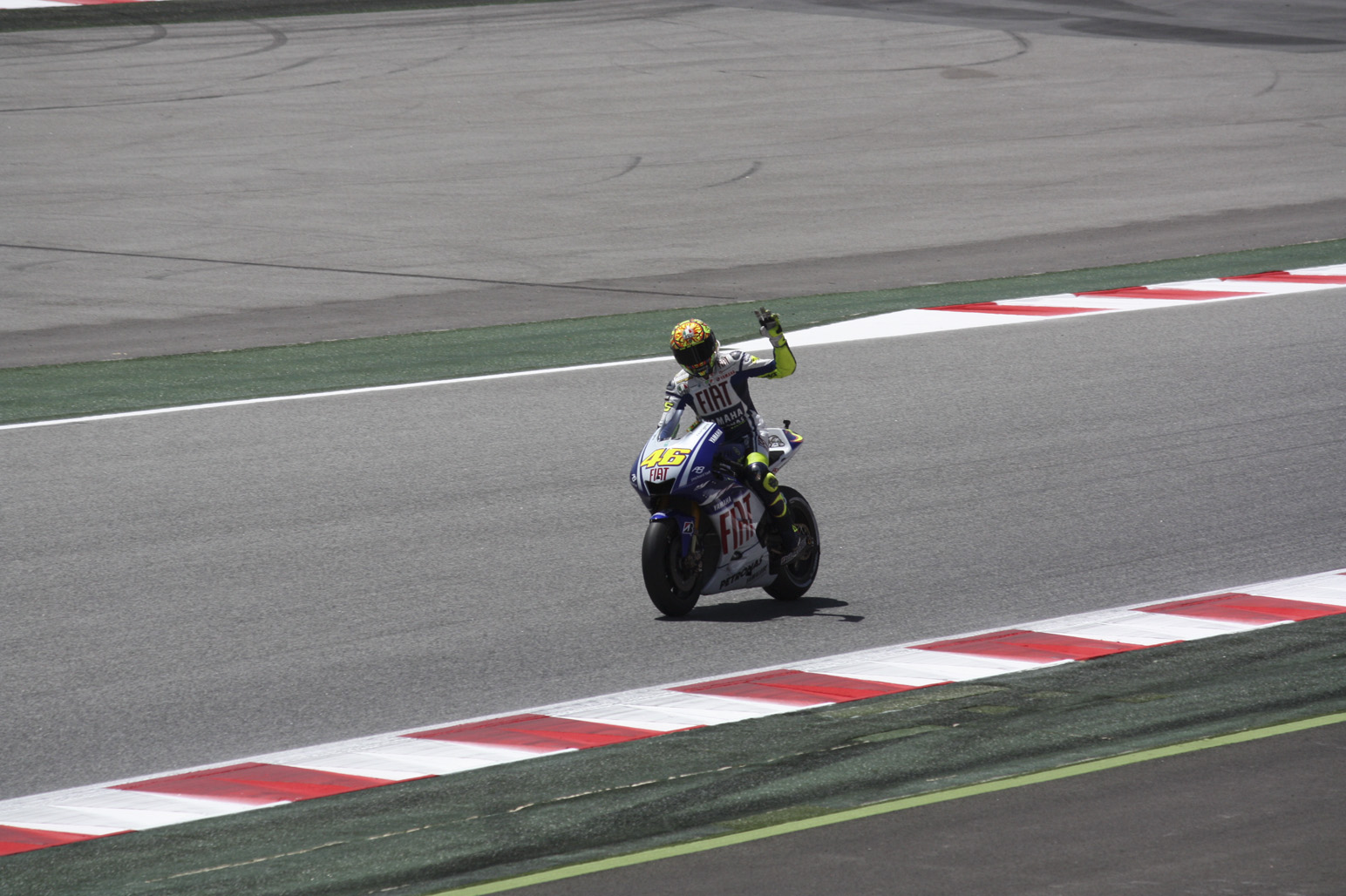
Valentino Rossi, waving at the crowd after winning the MotoGP race.

== MotoGP classification ==
Pos.	No.	Rider	Team	Manufacturer	Laps	Time/Retired	Grid	Points
1	46	(Italy) Valentino Rossi	Fiat Yamaha Team	Yamaha	25	43:11.897	2	25
2	99	(Spain) Jorge Lorenzo	Fiat Yamaha Team	Yamaha	25	+0.095	1	20
3	27	(Australia) Casey Stoner	Ducati Marlboro Team	Ducati	25	+8.884	3	16
4	4	(Italy) Andrea Dovizioso	Repsol Honda Team	Honda	25	+8.936	4	13
5	65	(Italy) Loris Capirossi	Rizla Suzuki MotoGP	Suzuki	25	+19.831	11	11
6	3	(Spain) Dani Pedrosa	Repsol Honda Team	Honda	25	+22.182	8	10
7	5	(United States) Colin Edwards	Monster Yamaha Tech 3	Yamaha	25	+23.547	6	9
8	14	(France) Randy de Puniet	LCR Honda MotoGP	Honda	25	+25.265	7	8
9	36	(Finland) Mika Kallio	Pramac Racing	Ducati	25	+31.797	10	7
10	69	(United States) Nicky Hayden	Ducati Marlboro Team	Ducati	25	+33.593	13	6
11	7	(Australia) Chris Vermeulen	Rizla Suzuki MotoGP	Suzuki	25	+36.683	12	5
12	15	(San Marino) Alex de Angelis	San Carlo Honda Gresini	Honda	25	+36.874	14	4
13	52	(United Kingdom) James Toseland	Monster Yamaha Tech 3	Yamaha	25	+39.433	9	3
14	33	(Italy) Marco Melandri	Hayate Racing Team	Kawasaki	25	+44.788	17	2
15	59	(Spain) Sete Gibernau	Grupo Francisco Hernando	Ducati	25	+46.754	15	1
16	88	(Italy) Niccolò Canepa	Pramac Racing	Ducati	25	+55.873	18	
17	41	(Hungary) Gábor Talmácsi	Scot Racing Team MotoGP	Honda	25	+1:27.640	19	
Ret	24	(Spain) Toni Elías	San Carlo Honda Gresini	Honda	9	Accident	5	
Ret	72	(Japan) Yuki Takahashi	Scot Racing Team MotoGP	Honda	0	Accident	16	

== 250 cc classification ==
Pos.	No.	Rider	Manufacturer	Laps	Time/Retired	Grid	Points
1	19	(Spain) Álvaro Bautista	Aprilia	23	41:09.018	2	25
2	4	(Japan) Hiroshi Aoyama	Honda	23	+7.185	6	20
3	40	(Spain) Héctor Barberá	Aprilia	23	+7.282	1	16
4	75	(Italy) Mattia Pasini	Aprilia	23	+10.784	7	13
5	6	(Spain) Alex Debón	Aprilia	23	+15.740	5	11
6	12	(Switzerland) Thomas Lüthi	Aprilia	23	+15.780	4	10
7	14	(Thailand) Ratthapark Wilairot	Honda	23	+28.654	10	9
8	17	(Czech Republic) Karel Abraham	Aprilia	23	+31.600	12	8
9	35	(Italy) Raffaele De Rosa	Honda	23	+33.760	13	7
10	55	(Spain) Héctor Faubel	Honda	23	+33.843	8	6
11	16	(France) Jules Cluzel	Aprilia	23	+34.871	14	5
12	52	(Czech Republic) Lukáš Pešek	Aprilia	23	+35.117	17	4
13	25	(Italy) Alex Baldolini	Aprilia	23	+39.840	11	3
14	63	(France) Mike Di Meglio	Aprilia	23	+42.821	9	2
15	51	(United States) Stevie Bonsey	Aprilia	23	+1:16.524	19	1
16	7	(Spain) Axel Pons	Aprilia	23	+1:16.689	18	
17	53	(France) Valentin Debise	Honda	23	+1:28.826	20	
18	11	(Hungary) Balázs Németh	Aprilia	23	+1:39.488	21	
19	8	(Switzerland) Bastien Chesaux	Honda	23	+1:47.958	22	
20	56	(Russia) Vladimir Leonov	Aprilia	22	+1 lap	24	
21	54	(United Kingdom) Toby Markham	Honda	22	+1 lap	25	
Ret	10	(Hungary) Imre Tóth	Aprilia	21	Retirement	23	
Ret	15	(Italy) Roberto Locatelli	Gilera	14	Accident	16	
Ret	48	(Japan) Shoya Tomizawa	Honda	13	Retirement	15	
Ret	58	(Italy) Marco Simoncelli	Gilera	6	Retirement	3	
OFFICIAL 250cc REPORT

== 125 cc classification ==
Pos.	No.	Rider	Manufacturer	Laps	Time/Retired	Grid	Points
1	29	(Italy) Andrea Iannone	Aprilia	22	41:10.494	8	25
2	18	(Spain) Nicolás Terol	Aprilia	22	+2.245	6	20
3	33	(Spain) Sergio Gadea	Aprilia	22	+2.330	5	16
4	60	(Spain) Julián Simón	Aprilia	22	+2.331	1	13
5	93	(Spain) Marc Márquez	KTM	22	+2.356	12	11
6	94	(Germany) Jonas Folger	Aprilia	22	+2.531	3	10
7	17	(Germany) Stefan Bradl	Aprilia	22	+10.795	9	9
8	38	(United Kingdom) Bradley Smith	Aprilia	22	+10.824	7	8
9	11	(Germany) Sandro Cortese	Derbi	22	+14.984	14	7
10	35	(Switzerland) Randy Krummenacher	Aprilia	22	+15.089	4	6
11	45	(United Kingdom) Scott Redding	Aprilia	22	+16.427	10	5
12	12	(Spain) Esteve Rabat	Aprilia	22	+16.515	17	4
13	14	(France) Johann Zarco	Aprilia	22	+27.455	13	3
14	6	(Spain) Joan Olivé	Derbi	22	+27.712	16	2
15	73	(Japan) Takaaki Nakagami	Aprilia	22	+28.411	21	1
16	24	(Italy) Simone Corsi	Aprilia	22	+33.697	23	
17	71	(Japan) Tomoyoshi Koyama	Loncin	22	+42.581	15	
18	16	(United States) Cameron Beaubier	KTM	22	+48.847	22	
19	42	(Spain) Alberto Moncayo	Aprilia	22	+49.532	25	
20	77	(Switzerland) Dominique Aegerter	Derbi	22	+49.772	18	
21	53	(Netherlands) Jasper Iwema	Honda	22	+1:02.666	27	
22	50	(Norway) Sturla Fagerhaug	KTM	22	+1:15.215	28	
23	43	(Spain) Johnny Rosell	Aprilia	22	+1:21.568	26	
24	87	(Italy) Luca Marconi	Aprilia	22	+1:37.919	31	
25	31	(Spain) Jordi Dalmau	Honda	21	+1 lap	34	
26	10	(Italy) Luca Vitali	Aprilia	20	+2 laps	33	
Ret	32	(Italy) Lorenzo Savadori	Aprilia	16	Accident	24	
Ret	39	(Spain) Luis Salom	Honda	13	Retirement	31	
Ret	99	(United Kingdom) Danny Webb	Aprilia	11	Retirement	11	
Ret	8	(Italy) Lorenzo Zanetti	Aprilia	10	Retirement	19	
Ret	44	(Spain) Pol Espargaró	Derbi	5	Retirement	2	
Ret	5	(France) Alexis Masbou	Loncin	5	Retirement	30	
Ret	69	(Czech Republic) Lukáš Šembera	Aprilia	4	Retirement	29	
Ret	7	(Spain) Efrén Vázquez	Derbi	1	Retirement	20	
OFFICIAL 125cc REPORT

== Incident ==
Julian Simon, a Spanish racer in the 125cc race, celebrated victory one lap early, as he was confused with the sign that his team had shown him. He thought the sign said he was first position with no laps left, when the sign actually says 'L1' which means that he had one lap remaining. Andrea Iannone stormed to the lead and won, whilst Simon could only finish fourth.

== Championship standings after the race (MotoGP) ==
Below are the standings for the top five riders and constructors after round six has concluded.

Riders' Championship standings

Pos.	Rider	Points
1	(Italy) Valentino Rossi	106
2	(Spain) Jorge Lorenzo	106
3	(Australia) Casey Stoner	106
4	(Italy) Andrea Dovizioso	69
5	(Spain) Dani Pedrosa	67

Constructors' Championship standings

Pos.	Constructor	Points
1	(Japan) Yamaha	140
2	(Italy) Ducati	106
3	(Japan) Honda	89
4	(Japan) Suzuki	60
5	(Japan) Kawasaki	50

- Note: Only the top five positions are included for both sets of standings.

Previous race: 2009 Italian Grand Prix	FIM Grand Prix World Championship; 2009 season	Next race: 2009 Dutch TT
Previous race: 2008 Catalan Grand Prix	Catalan motorcycle Grand Prix	Next race: 2010 Catalan Grand Prix
