= 2009 Dutch TT =

(Netherlands) 2009 Dutch Grand Prix
Race details
- Race 7 of 17 races in the 2009 Grand Prix motorcycle racing season
- Date: 27 June 2009
- Official name: Alice TT Assen
- Location: TT Circuit Assen
- Course: Permanent racing facility; 4.555 km (2.830 mi)

MotoGP
Pole position
- Rider: (Italy) Valentino Rossi
- Time: 1:36.025
Fastest lap
- Rider: (Italy) Valentino Rossi
- Time: 1:36.558
Podium
- First: (Italy) Valentino Rossi
- Second: (Spain) Jorge Lorenzo
- Third: (Australia) Casey Stoner

250cc
Pole position
- Rider: (Spain) Héctor Barberá
- Time: 1:40.019
Fastest lap
- Rider: (Japan) Hiroshi Aoyama
- Time: 1:40.706
Podium
- First: (Japan) Hiroshi Aoyama
- Second: (Spain) Héctor Barberá
- Third: (Italy) Marco Simoncelli

125cc
Pole position
- Rider: (Germany) Sandro Cortese
- Time: 1:45.430
Fastest lap
- Rider: (Spain) Julián Simón
- Time: 1:45.537
Podium
- First: (Spain) Sergio Gadea
- Second: (Spain) Julián Simón
- Third: (United Kingdom) Bradley Smith

The 2009 Dutch TT was the seventh round of the 2009 Grand Prix motorcycle racing season. It took place on the weekend of 25–27 June 2009 at the TT Circuit Assen.

Valentino Rossi won the MotoGP race, his 100th career victory, ahead of teammate Jorge Lorenzo, with Australia's Casey Stoner, who led early on, finishing third.

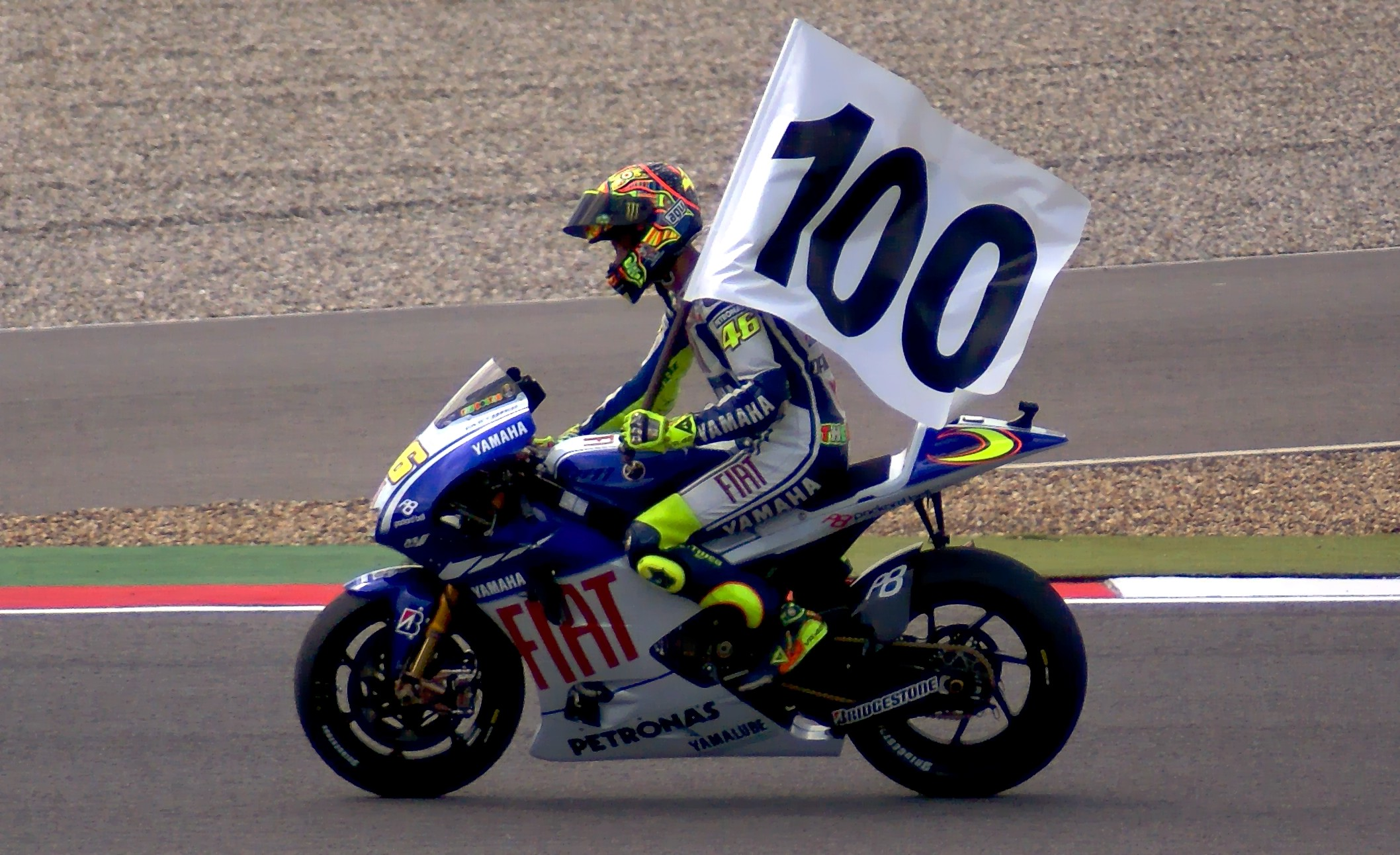
Valentino Rossi, celebrating his 100th MotoGP race victory with a flag.

== MotoGP classification ==
| Pos. | No. | Rider | Team | Manufacturer | Laps | Time/Retired | Grid | Points |
|---|---|---|---|---|---|---|---|---|
| 1 | 46 | (Italy) Valentino Rossi | Fiat Yamaha Team | Yamaha | 26 | 42:14.611 | 1 | 25 |
| 2 | 99 | (Spain) Jorge Lorenzo | Fiat Yamaha Team | Yamaha | 26 | +5.368 | 3 | 20 |
| 3 | 27 | (Australia) Casey Stoner | Ducati Marlboro Team | Ducati | 26 | +23.113 | 4 | 16 |
| 4 | 5 | (United States) Colin Edwards | Monster Yamaha Tech 3 | Yamaha | 26 | +29.114 | 5 | 13 |
| 5 | 7 | (Australia) Chris Vermeulen | Rizla Suzuki MotoGP | Suzuki | 26 | +33.605 | 7 | 11 |
| 6 | 52 | (United Kingdom) James Toseland | Monster Yamaha Tech 3 | Yamaha | 26 | +39.347 | 9 | 10 |
| 7 | 14 | (France) Randy de Puniet | LCR Honda MotoGP | Honda | 26 | +39.543 | 10 | 9 |
| 8 | 69 | (United States) Nicky Hayden | Ducati Marlboro Team | Ducati | 26 | +39.823 | 13 | 8 |
| 9 | 65 | (Italy) Loris Capirossi | Rizla Suzuki MotoGP | Suzuki | 26 | +40.673 | 6 | 7 |
| 10 | 15 | (San Marino) Alex de Angelis | San Carlo Honda Gresini | Honda | 26 | +46.010 | 11 | 6 |
| 11 | 33 | (Italy) Marco Melandri | Hayate Racing Team | Kawasaki | 26 | +57.777 | 14 | 5 |
| 12 | 24 | (Spain) Toni Elías | San Carlo Honda Gresini | Honda | 26 | +59.774 (Note: 20-second penalty.) | 15 | 4 |
| 13 | 59 | (Spain) Sete Gibernau | San Carlo Honda Gresini | Ducati | 26 | +1:05.366 | 16 | 3 |
| 14 | 88 | (Italy) Niccolò Canepa | Pramac Racing | Ducati | 26 | +1:09.897 | 17 | 2 |
| 15 | 72 | (Japan) Yuki Takahashi | Scot Racing Team MotoGP | Honda | 26 | +1:09.930 | 18 | 1 |
| 16 | 41 | (Hungary) Gábor Talmácsi | Scot Racing Team MotoGP | Honda | 26 | +1:25.099 | 19 | |
| Ret | 36 | (Finland) Mika Kallio | Pramac Racing | Ducati | 25 | Accident | 12 | |
| Ret | 4 | (Italy) Andrea Dovizioso | Repsol Honda Team | Honda | 10 | Accident | 8 | |
| Ret | 3 | (Spain) Dani Pedrosa | Repsol Honda Team | Honda | 4 | Accident | 2 | |

== 250 cc classification ==
| Pos. | No. | Rider | Manufacturer | Laps | Time/Retired | Grid | Points |
|---|---|---|---|---|---|---|---|
| 1 | 4 | (Japan) Hiroshi Aoyama | Honda | 24 | 40:44.008 | 2 | 25 |
| 2 | 40 | (Spain) Héctor Barberá | Aprilia | 24 | +4.424 | 1 | 20 |
| 3 | 58 | (Italy) Marco Simoncelli | Gilera | 24 | +10.339 | 4 | 16 |
| 4 | 41 | (Spain) Aleix Espargaró | Aprilia | 24 | +11.383 | 5 | 13 |
| 5 | 15 | (Italy) Roberto Locatelli | Gilera | 24 | +11.596 | 12 | 11 |
| 6 | 6 | (Spain) Álex Debón | Aprilia | 24 | +14.265 | 6 | 10 |
| 7 | 17 | (Czech Republic) Karel Abraham | Aprilia | 24 | +17.982 | 14 | 9 |
| 8 | 55 | (Spain) Héctor Faubel | Honda | 24 | +19.012 | 13 | 8 |
| 9 | 14 | (Thailand) Ratthapark Wilairot | Honda | 24 | +20.926 | 11 | 7 |
| 10 | 35 | (Italy) Raffaele De Rosa | Honda | 24 | +21.033 | 7 | 6 |
| 11 | 63 | (France) Mike Di Meglio | Aprilia | 24 | +32.128 | 9 | 5 |
| 12 | 52 | (Czech Republic) Lukáš Pešek | Aprilia | 24 | +41.329 | 10 | 4 |
| 13 | 25 | (Italy) Alex Baldolini | Aprilia | 24 | +1:05.321 | 19 | 3 |
| 14 | 53 | (France) Valentin Debise | Honda | 24 | +1:12.451 | 21 | 2 |
| 15 | 10 | (Hungary) Imre Tóth | Aprilia | 23 | +1 lap | 22 | 1 |
| 16 | 56 | (Russia) Vladimir Leonov | Aprilia | 23 | +1 lap | 24 | |
| Ret | 19 | (Spain) Álvaro Bautista | Aprilia | 22 | Collision | 3 | |
| Ret | 8 | (Switzerland) Bastien Chesaux | Honda | 19 | Accident | 23 | |
| Ret | 7 | (Spain) Axel Pons | Aprilia | 16 | Retirement | 20 | |
| Ret | 54 | (United Kingdom) Toby Markham | Honda | 14 | Retirement | 25 | |
| Ret | 80 | (United States) Stevie Bonsey | Aprilia | 13 | Retirement | 18 | |
| Ret | 75 | (Italy) Mattia Pasini | Aprilia | 13 | Damage | 8 | |
| Ret | 12 | (Switzerland) Thomas Lüthi | Aprilia | 10 | Collision | 15 | |
| Ret | 16 | (France) Jules Cluzel | Aprilia | 5 | Accident | 17 | |
| Ret | 48 | (Japan) Shoya Tomizawa | Honda | 0 | Accident | 16 | |
OFFICIAL 250cc REPORT

== 125 cc classification ==
| Pos. | No. | Rider | Manufacturer | Laps | Time/Retired | Grid | Points |
|---|---|---|---|---|---|---|---|
| 1 | 33 | (Spain) Sergio Gadea | Aprilia | 22 | 39:07.577 | 9 | 25 |
| 2 | 60 | (Spain) Julián Simón | Aprilia | 22 | +0.901 | 2 | 20 |
| 3 | 38 | (United Kingdom) Bradley Smith | Aprilia | 22 | +12.356 | 5 | 16 |
| 4 | 29 | (Italy) Andrea Iannone | Aprilia | 22 | +12.400 | 6 | 13 |
| 5 | 18 | (Spain) Nicolás Terol | Aprilia | 22 | +20.078 (Note: Terol was given a 20-second penalty after the race for forcing Simón out of the track during the last lap.) | 3 | 11 |
| 6 | 17 | (Germany) Stefan Bradl | Aprilia | 22 | +20.468 | 4 | 10 |
| 7 | 94 | (Germany) Jonas Folger | Aprilia | 22 | +20.755 | 18 | 9 |
| 8 | 24 | (Italy) Simone Corsi | Aprilia | 22 | +21.263 | 7 | 8 |
| 9 | 44 | (Spain) Pol Espargaró | Derbi | 22 | +21.558 | 8 | 7 |
| 10 | 93 | (Spain) Marc Márquez | KTM | 22 | +21.941 | 10 | 6 |
| 11 | 6 | (Spain) Joan Olivé | Derbi | 22 | +23.605 | 11 | 5 |
| 12 | 7 | (Spain) Efrén Vázquez | Derbi | 22 | +28.406 | 15 | 4 |
| 13 | 77 | (Switzerland) Dominique Aegerter | Derbi | 22 | +1:00.312 | 19 | 3 |
| 14 | 85 | (Germany) Marvin Fritz | Honda | 22 | +1:00.355 | 25 | 2 |
| 15 | 8 | (Italy) Lorenzo Zanetti | Aprilia | 22 | +1:00.615 | 23 | 1 |
| 16 | 39 | (Spain) Luis Salom | Aprilia | 22 | +1:00.629 | 22 | |
| 17 | 73 | (Japan) Takaaki Nakagami | Aprilia | 22 | +1:00.997 | 27 | |
| 18 | 82 | (Netherlands) Michael van der Mark | Honda | 22 | +1:01.030 | 24 | |
| 19 | 53 | (Netherlands) Jasper Iwema | Honda | 22 | +1:08.795 | 26 | |
| 20 | 69 | (Czech Republic) Lukáš Šembera | Aprilia | 22 | +1:09.076 | 30 | |
| 21 | 14 | (France) Johann Zarco | Aprilia | 22 | +1:14.817 | 16 | |
| 22 | 86 | (Czech Republic) Karel Pešek | Derbi | 22 | +1:30.729 | 29 | |
| 23 | 87 | (Italy) Luca Marconi | Aprilia | 22 | +1:46.244 | 31 | |
| 24 | 83 | (Netherlands) Pepijn Bijsterbosch | Honda | 21 | +1 lap | 34 | |
| 25 | 10 | (Italy) Luca Vitali | Aprilia | 21 | +1 lap | 33 | |
| Ret | 12 | (Spain) Esteve Rabat | Aprilia | 11 | Accident | 12 | |
| Ret | 71 | (Japan) Tomoyoshi Koyama | Loncin | 9 | Retirement | 32 | |
| Ret | 16 | (United States) Cameron Beaubier | KTM | 5 | Retirement | 20 | |
| Ret | 11 | (Germany) Sandro Cortese | Derbi | 4 | Accident | 1 | |
| Ret | 35 | (Switzerland) Randy Krummenacher | Aprilia | 1 | Accident | 14 | |
| Ret | 32 | (Italy) Lorenzo Savadori | Aprilia | 1 | Accident | 21 | |
| Ret | 45 | (United Kingdom) Scott Redding | Aprilia | 1 | Retirement | 17 | |
| Ret | 5 | (France) Alexis Masbou | Loncin | 1 | Retirement | 28 | |
| Ret | 99 | (United Kingdom) Danny Webb | Aprilia | 0 | Accident | 13 | |
| DNQ | 84 | (Netherlands) Roy Pouw | Aprilia | | Did not qualify | | |
OFFICIAL 125cc REPORT

== Championship standings after the race (MotoGP) ==
Below are the standings for the top five riders and constructors after round seven has concluded.

Riders' Championship standings

| Pos. | Rider | Points |
|---|---|---|
| 1 | (Italy) Valentino Rossi | 131 |
| 2 | (Spain) Jorge Lorenzo | 126 |
| 3 | (Australia) Casey Stoner | 122 |
| 4 | (Italy) Andrea Dovizioso | 69 |
| 5 | (Spain) Dani Pedrosa | 67 |

Constructors' Championship standings

| Pos. | Constructor | Points |
|---|---|---|
| 1 | (Japan) Yamaha | 165 |
| 2 | (Italy) Ducati | 122 |
| 3 | (Japan) Honda | 98 |
| 4 | (Japan) Suzuki | 71 |
| 5 | (Japan) Kawasaki | 55 |

- Note: Only the top five positions are included for both sets of standings.

| Previous race: 2009 Catalan Grand Prix | FIM Grand Prix World Championship; 2009 season | Next race: 2009 United States Grand Prix |
| Previous race: 2008 Dutch TT | Dutch TT | Next race: 2010 Dutch TT |
