= Sergio Gadea =

Spanish motorcycle racer

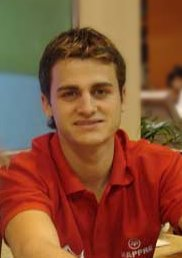
- Gadea in 2008
- Nationality: Spanish
- Born: 30 December 1984 (age 41); Puçol, Spain
- Bike number: 33

Sergio Gadea Panisello (born 30 December 1984 in Puçol, Valencian Community) is a Spanish motorcycle road racer.
