= Steven Le Coquen =

French motorcycle racer

- Nationality: French
- Born: 11 July 1991 (age 35); Chartres, France
- Current team: Yamaha Viltaïs Experience
- Bike number: 333

Steven Le Coquen is a Grand Prix motorcycle racer from France. He competes in the Endurance World Cup aboard a Yamaha YZF-R1.

== Career statistics ==
2010 - 11th, European Superstock 600 Championship, Yamaha YZF-R6

=== Grand Prix motorcycle results ===
==== By season ====
Season	Class	Motorcycle	Team	Number	Race	Win	Podium	Pole	FLap	Pts	Plcd
2007	125cc	Honda	Villiers Team Competition	47	1	0	0	0	0	0	NC
2008	125cc	Honda	Villiers Team Competition	52	1	0	0	0	0	0	NC
2009	125cc	Honda	Villiers Team Competition	52	1	0	0	0	0	0	NC
Total					**3**	**0**	**0**	**0**	**0**	**0**	

==== Races by year ====
Year	Class	Bike	1	2	3	4	5	6	7	8	9	10	11	12	13	14	15	16	17	Pos	Points
2007	125cc	Honda	QAT	SPA	TUR	CHN	FRA; 29	ITA	CAT	GBR	NED	GER	CZE	RSM	POR	JPN	AUS	MAL	VAL	NC	0
2008	125cc	Honda	QAT	SPA	POR	CHN	FRA; Ret	ITA	CAT	GBR	NED	GER	CZE	RSM	INP	JPN	AUS	MAL	VAL	NC	0
2009	125cc	Honda	QAT	JPN	SPA	FRA; Ret	ITA	CAT	NED	GER	GBR	CZE	INP	RSM	POR	AUS	MAL	VAL		NC	0

=== European Superstock 600 ===
==== Races by year ====
(key) (Races in bold indicate pole position, races in italics indicate fastest lap)

Year	Bike	1	2	3	4	5	6	7	8	9	10	Pos	Pts
2010	Yamaha	POR; 15	VAL; 9	ASS; 13	MNZ; 6	MIS; Ret	BRN; 5	SIL; 6	NÜR; Ret	IMO; 15	MAG; Ret	11th	43
