= Jed Metcher =

Australian motorcycle racer (born 1990)

- Nationality: Australian
- Born: 13 April 1990 (age 36); Melbourne, Australia
- Website: jedmetcherracing.com.au
Motorcycle racing career statistics
125cc World Championship
| Active years | 2008 |
| Manufacturers | Honda |
| Championships | 0 |
| 2008 championship position | NC (0 pts) |
Starts / Wins / Podiums / Poles / F. laps / Points; 1 / 0 / 0 / 0 / 0 / 0
Superbike World Championship
| Active years | 2015 |
| Manufacturers | Kawasaki |
| Championships | 0 |
| 2015 championship position | 33rd (2 pts) |
Starts / Wins / Podiums / Poles / F. laps / Points; 2 / 0 / 0 / 0 / 0 / 2
Supersport World Championship
| Active years | 2012–2013, 2016 |
| Manufacturers | Yamaha, Suzuki, Honda |
| Championships | 0 |
| 2016 championship position | NC (0 pts) |
Starts / Wins / Podiums / Poles / F. laps / Points; 15 / 0 / 0 / 0 / 0 / 40

Jed Metcher (born 13 April 1990) is an Australian former Grand Prix motorcycle racer, team owner, and manager from Victoria. He is a former competitor in the Australian 125cc Championship, the Australian Supersport Championship, the Supersport World Championship, the British Superbike Championship, and the European Superstock 600 Championship where he finished as champion in 2011, the IDM Supersport Championship and the IDM Superbike Championship. Metcher is a supporter of the Hands Across the Water Charity bike ride.

== Career statistics ==
=== Career highlights ===
2006- 8th, Australian 125 Championship #13 Honda RS125R
2007- 7th, Australian 125 Championship #13 Honda RS125R
2008- 3rd, Australian 125 Championship #13 Honda RS125R
2009- 8th, Australian Supersport Championship #71 Yamaha YZF-R6
2010- 17th, IDM Superbike Championship #77 Honda CBR1000RR
2010 - 16th, European Superstock 600 Championship, Yamaha YZF-R6
2011- 1st, European Superstock 600 Championship #3 Yamaha YZF-R6
2012- 14th, Supersport World Championship #3 Yamaha YZF-R6
2013- 4th, IDM Supersport Championship #3 Suzuki GSX-R600
2014- Australasian Formula OZ Championship #91 Kawasaki ZX-10R
2014- Winner of the 63rd Harvie Wiltshire Memorial Trophy at Phillip Island #91 Kawasaki ZX-10R
2014 - 15th, FIM Superstock 1000 Cup, Ducati 1098
2015- 6th, International Island Classic. Winner of race four #91 Suzuki Katana
2015- 33rd, British Superbike Championship #68 Kawasaki ZX-10R
2016 - NC, FIM Superstock 1000 Cup, Kawasaki ZX-10R

=== Grand Prix motorcycle racing ===
==== By season ====
| Season | Class | Motorcycle | Team | Number | Race | Win | Podium | Pole | FLap | Pts | Plcd |
|---|---|---|---|---|---|---|---|---|---|---|---|
| 2008 | 125cc | Honda | Angelo's Aluminium Racing | 91 | 1 | 0 | 0 | 0 | 0 | 0 | NC |
| Total | | | | | **1** | **0** | **0** | **0** | **0** | **0** | |

==== Races by year ====
(key)

| Year | Class | Bike | 1 | 2 | 3 | 4 | 5 | 6 | 7 | 8 | 9 | 10 | 11 | 12 | 13 | 14 | 15 | 16 | 17 | Pos | Pts |
|---|---|---|---|---|---|---|---|---|---|---|---|---|---|---|---|---|---|---|---|---|---|
| 2008 | 125cc | Honda | QAT | SPA | POR | CHN | FRA | ITA | CAT | GBR | NED | GER | CZE | RSM | INP | JPN | AUS; 20 | MAL | VAL | NC | 0 |

=== European Superstock 600 ===
==== Races by year ====
(key) (Races in bold indicate pole position, races in italics indicate fastest lap)

| Year | Bike | 1 | 2 | 3 | 4 | 5 | 6 | 7 | 8 | 9 | 10 | Pos | Pts |
|---|---|---|---|---|---|---|---|---|---|---|---|---|---|
| 2010 | Yamaha | POR | VAL | ASS | MNZ | MIS | BRN | SIL | NÜR | IMO | MAG; 1 | 17th | 25 |
| 2011 | Yamaha | ASS; 3 | MNZ; 21 | MIS; 2 | ARA; 1 | BRN; Ret | SIL; 2 | NÜR; 2 | IMO; 3 | MAG; 2 | POR; 4 | 1st | 150 |

=== Supersport World Championship ===
==== Races by year ====
(key)

| Year | Bike | 1 | 2 | 3 | 4 | 5 | 6 | 7 | 8 | 9 | 10 | 11 | 12 | 13 | Pos. | Pts |
|---|---|---|---|---|---|---|---|---|---|---|---|---|---|---|---|---|
| 2012 | Yamaha | AUS; 11 | ITA; 15 | NED; Ret | ITA; 11 | EUR; 13 | SMR; 7 | SPA; 8 | CZE; Ret | GBR; Ret | RUS; Ret | GER; 15 | POR; 14 | FRA; 10 | 14th | 40 |
| 2013 | Suzuki | AUS | SPA | NED | ITA | GBR | POR | ITA | RUS | GBR | GER; 17 | TUR | FRA | SPA | NC | 0 |
| 2016 | Honda | AUS | THA | SPA | NED | ITA; 23 | MAL | GBR | ITA | GER | FRA | SPA | QAT | | NC | 0 |

=== Superstock 1000 Cup ===
==== Races by year ====
(key) (Races in bold indicate pole position) (Races in italics indicate fastest lap)

| Year | Bike | 1 | 2 | 3 | 4 | 5 | 6 | 7 | 8 | Pos | Pts |
|---|---|---|---|---|---|---|---|---|---|---|---|
| 2014 | Kawasaki | ARA | NED | IMO | MIS | ALG | JER; Ret | MAG; 3 | | 15th | 16 |
| 2016 | Kawasaki | ARA | NED; 26 | IMO | DON | MIS | LAU | MAG | JER | NC | 0 |

=== Superbike World Championship ===
==== Races by year ====
(key)

| Year | Bike | 1 | | 2 | | 3 | | 4 | | 5 | | 6 | | 7 | | 8 | | 9 | | 10 | | 11 | | 12 | | 13 | | Pos | Pts |
| Year | Bike | R1 | R2 | R1 | R2 | R1 | R2 | R1 | R2 | R1 | R2 | R1 | R2 | R1 | R2 | R1 | R2 | R1 | R2 | R1 | R2 | R1 | R2 | R1 | R2 | R1 | R2 | Pos | Pts |
|---|---|---|---|---|---|---|---|---|---|---|---|---|---|---|---|---|---|---|---|---|---|---|---|---|---|---|---|---|---|
| 2015 | Kawasaki | AUS; 14 | AUS; Ret | THA | THA | SPA | SPA | NED | NED | ITA | ITA | GBR | GBR | POR | POR | SMR | SMR | USA | USA | MAL | MAL | SPA | SPA | FRA | FRA | QAT | QAT | 33rd | 2 |

=== British Superbike Championship ===
| Year | Make | 1 | | | 2 | | | 3 | | | 4 | | | 5 | | | 6 | | | 7 | | | 8 | | | 9 | | | 10 | | | 11 | | | 12 | | | Pos | Pts |
| Year | Make | R1 | R2 | R3 | R1 | R2 | R3 | R1 | R2 | R3 | R1 | R2 | R3 | R1 | R2 | R3 | R1 | R2 | R3 | R1 | R2 | R3 | R1 | R2 | R3 | R1 | R2 | R3 | R1 | R2 | R3 | R1 | R2 | R3 | R1 | R2 | R3 | Pos | Pts |
|---|---|---|---|---|---|---|---|---|---|---|---|---|---|---|---|---|---|---|---|---|---|---|---|---|---|---|---|---|---|---|---|---|---|---|---|---|---|---|---|
| 2014 | Kawasaki | BHI | BHI | | OUL | OUL | | SNE | SNE | | KNO | KNO | | BHGP | BHGP | | THR | THR | | OUL | OUL | OUL | CAD | CAD | | DON | DON | | ASS; 7 | ASS; 13 | | SIL | SIL | | BHGP; 18 | BHGP; 18 | BHGP; 18 | 27th | 12 |

| Year | Make | 1 | | 2 | | 3 | | | 4 | | 5 | | 6 | | | 7 | | 8 | | | 9 | | | 10 | | 11 | | 12 | | | Pos | Pts |
| Year | Make | R1 | R2 | R1 | R2 | R1 | R2 | R3 | R1 | R2 | R1 | R2 | R1 | R2 | R3 | R1 | R2 | R1 | R2 | R3 | R1 | R2 | R3 | R1 | R2 | R1 | R2 | R1 | R2 | R3 | Pos | Pts |
|---|---|---|---|---|---|---|---|---|---|---|---|---|---|---|---|---|---|---|---|---|---|---|---|---|---|---|---|---|---|---|---|---|
| 2015 | Kawasaki | DON | DON | BHI | BHI | OUL | OUL | | SNE; 21 | SNE; 20 | KNO; 15 | KNO; 16 | BHGP; 18 | BHGP; Ret | | THR; DNS | THR; DNS | CAD; Ret | CAD; DNS | | OUL; 17 | OUL; 19 | OUL; 21 | ASS; Ret | ASS; 18 | SIL; 20 | SIL; 20 | BHGP | BHGP | BHGP | 32nd | 1 |

=== Australian Superbike Championship ===
==== Races by year ====
(key) (Races in bold indicate pole position, races in italics indicate fastest lap)

| Year | Bike | 1 | | 2 | | 3 | | 4 | | | 5 | | 6 | | | 7 | | Pos | Pts |
| Year | Bike | R1 | R2 | R1 | R2 | R1 | R2 | R1 | R2 | R3 | R1 | R2 | R1 | R2 | R3 | R1 | R2 | Pos | Pts |
|---|---|---|---|---|---|---|---|---|---|---|---|---|---|---|---|---|---|---|---|
| 2022 | Yamaha | PHI; 12 | PHI; 10 | QUE; Ret | QUE; Ret | WAK; 11 | WAK; 12 | HDV | HDV | HDV | MPR; 9 | MPT; 10 | PHI; 5 | PHI; 12 | PHI; 6 | TBM; 12 | TBM; 11 | 12th | 121 |
