= Cyril Carrillo =

French motorcycle racer

- Nationality: French
- Born: 1 September 1990 (age 36); Marseille, France
Motorcycle racing career statistics
125cc World Championship
Active years	2007–2009
Manufacturers	Honda
Starts / Wins / Podiums / Poles / F. laps / Points; 7 / 0 / 0 / 0 / 0 / 0

Cyril Carrillo (born 1 September 1990) is a French motorcycle racer who has competed in the 125cc World Championship, the Red Bull MotoGP Rookies Cup and the European Superstock 600 Championship. He won the French 125 Championship in 2009.

== Career statistics ==
2010 - 23rd, European Superstock 600 Championship, Yamaha YZF-R6

=== Red Bull MotoGP Rookies Cup ===
==== Races by year ====
(key) (Races in bold indicate pole position, races in italics indicate fastest lap)

Year	1	2	3	4	5	6	7	8	Pos	Pts
2007	SPA; 5	ITA; 11	GBR; 8	NED; 5	GER; Ret	CZE; 3	POR; 4	VAL; 3	5th	80

=== Grand Prix motorcycle racing ===
==== By season ====
Season	Class	Motorcycle	Team	Race	Win	Podium	Pole	FLap	Pts	Plcd
2007	125cc	Honda	FFM Honda GP 125	1	0	0	0	0	0	NC
2008	125cc	Honda	FFM Honda GP 125	5	0	0	0	0	0	NC
2009	125cc	Honda	TJP-TVX Racing	1	0	0	0	0	0	NC
Total				**7**	**0**	**0**	**0**	**0**	**0**	

==== Races by year ====
(key)

Year	Class	Bike	1	2	3	4	5	6	7	8	9	10	11	12	13	14	15	16	17	Pos.	Pts
2007	125cc	Honda	QAT	SPA	TUR	CHN	FRA	ITA	CAT	GBR	NED	GER	CZE	RSM	POR	JPN	AUS	MAL; 25	VAL	NC	0
2008	125cc	Honda	QAT	SPA	POR; 25	CHN	FRA; Ret	ITA	CAT	GBR	NED	GER	CZE	RSM	INP; 28	JPN; 26	AUS; 18	MAL; DNS	VAL	NC	0
2009	125cc	Honda	QAT	JPN	SPA	FRA; Ret	ITA	CAT	NED	GER	GBR	CZE	INP	RSM	POR	AUS	MAL	VAL		NC	0

=== European Superstock 600 ===
==== Races by year ====
(key) (Races in bold indicate pole position, races in italics indicate fastest lap)

Year	Bike	1	2	3	4	5	6	7	8	9	10	Pos	Pts
2010	Yamaha	POR; 11	VAL; Ret	ASS; 9	MNZ; Ret	MIS; DNS	BRN	SIL	NÜR	IMO	MAG	23rd	12
