= Roberto Locatelli =

Italian motorcycle racer (born 1974)

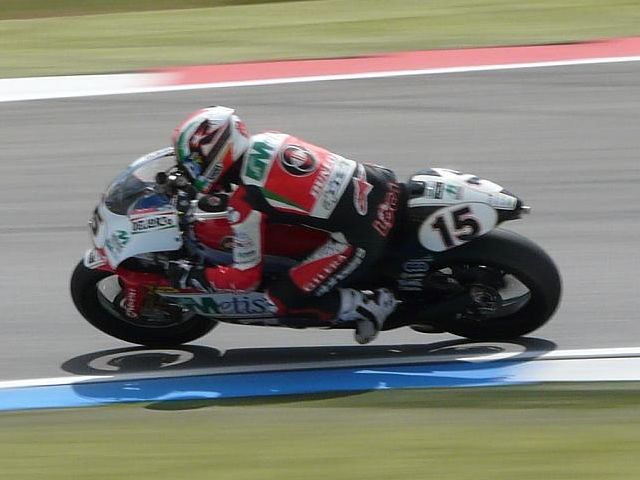
- Locatelli at the 2008 Dutch TT
- Nationality: Italian
- Born: 5 July 1974 (age 52); Bergamo, Italy
Motorcycle racing career statistics
250cc World Championship
Active years	1995–1996, 2001–2002, 2005–2009
Manufacturers	Aprilia, Gilera
Championships	0
2009 championship position	11th (85 pts)
Starts / Wins / Podiums / Poles / F. laps / Points; 130 / 0 / 6 / 1 / 2 / 831
125cc World Championship
Active years	1994, 1997–2000, 2003–2004
Manufacturers	Aprilia, Honda, KTM
Championships	1 (2000)
2004 championship position	3rd (192 pts)
Starts / Wins / Podiums / Poles / F. laps / Points; 84 / 9 / 19 / 17 / 8 / 803

Roberto Locatelli (born 5 July 1974) is an Italian former motorcycle rider who won the 125cc World Championship in 2000, and the Italian Sport Production Championship in 1993.

Locatelli was born in Bergamo. He started the 250cc World Championship of 2007 with a Gilera, but was severely injured in a practice session crash which caused him a broken leg and ankle and a concussion. He recovered in time to race two months later at Le Mans.

== Career statistics ==
=== Grand Prix motorcycle racing ===
==== Races by year ====
(key) (Races in bold indicate pole position; races in italics indicate fastest lap)

Year	Class	Bike	1	2	3	4	5	6	7	8	9	10	11	12	13	14	15	16	17	Pos	Pts
1994	125cc	Aprilia	AUS	MAL	JPN	SPA	AUT	GER	NED	**ITA**; 10	FRA	GBR	CZE	USA	ARG	EUR				29th	6
1995	250cc	Aprilia	AUS; Ret	MAL	JPN; 18	SPA; 10	GER	ITA; 13	NED; Ret	FRA; DNS	GBR; 14	CZE; 15	BRA; 9	ARG; 10	EUR; 10					17th	31
1996	250cc	Aprilia	MAL; 10	INA; Ret	JPN; 18	SPA; Ret	ITA; Ret	FRA; 8	NED; Ret	GER	GBR	AUT; Ret	CZE; 10	IMO; 12	CAT	BRA; 6	AUS; 9			17th	41
1997	125cc	Honda	MAL; 17	JPN; 11	SPA; 8	ITA; 14	AUT; 8	FRA; Ret	NED; 8	IMO; 7	GER; Ret	BRA; 11	GBR; 5	CZE; 4	CAT; 7	INA; 10	AUS; 4			8th	97
1998	125cc	Honda	JPN; Ret	MAL; 5	**SPA**; Ret	ITA; Ret	FRA; 4	MAD; Ret	NED; 7	GBR; Ret	GER; 3	CZE; 8	IMO; 7	**CAT**; 5	AUS; 6	**ARG**; Ret				9th	87
1999	125cc	Aprilia	MAL; 18	JPN; Ret	SPA; 5	FRA; 1	**ITA**; 1	**CAT**; 6	NED; 3	GBR; 4	GER; 4	**CZE**; Ret	IMO; 11	VAL; 8	AUS; 6	RSA; 4	BRA; 8	ARG; 3		4th	173
2000	125cc	Aprilia	**RSA**; 4	MAL; 1	JPN; Ret	**SPA**; 3	FRA; 4	**ITA**; 1	**CAT**; Ret	NED; 6	GBR; 4	GER; 2	**CZE**; 1	POR; 2	**VAL**; 1	**BRA**; Ret	**PAC**; 1	**AUS**; Ret		**1st**	**230**
2001	250cc	Aprilia	JPN; 3	RSA; 4	SPA; 8	FRA; 6	ITA; 4	CAT; 4	NED; 17	GBR; Ret	GER; Ret	CZE; 12	POR; Ret	VAL; 7	PAC; 6	AUS; 7	MAL; 4	BRA; 3		8th	134
2002	250cc	Aprilia	JPN; 16	RSA; 5	SPA; 5	FRA; 4	ITA; 2	CAT; Ret	NED; 7	GBR; 13	GER; 5	CZE; 7	POR; 5	BRA; Ret	PAC; 9	MAL; 13	AUS; Ret	VAL; 5		8th	119
2003	125cc	KTM	JPN; 23	RSA; 28	SPA; Ret	FRA; 15	ITA; 20	CAT; 10	NED; Ret	GBR; Ret	GER; 18	CZE; 17	POR; 11	BRA; 17	PAC; Ret	MAL; 10	AUS; Ret	VAL; 17		24th	18
2004	125cc	Aprilia	RSA; 2	SPA; 8	FRA; 2	ITA; 1	CAT; Ret	NED; 2	BRA; 4	GER; 1	GBR; Ret	CZE; 3	POR; 9	JPN; 14	QAT; 20	MAL; 4	**AUS**; 4	VAL; 6		**3rd**	**192**
2005	250cc	Aprilia	SPA; 7	POR; Ret	CHN; 16	FRA; 14	ITA; Ret	CAT; 12	NED; 11	GBR; 12	GER; Ret	CZE; 9	JPN; Ret	MAL; 8	QAT; Ret	AUS; 8	TUR; 8	VAL; 10		13th	61
2006	250cc	Aprilia	SPA; 7	QAT; 3	TUR; 4	CHN; 7	FRA; 6	ITA; 6	CAT; 4	NED; 5	GBR; 4	GER; 6	CZE; 4	MAL; 5	AUS; 7	JPN; 5	**POR**; 4	VAL; 2		5th	191
2007	250cc	Gilera	QAT; 6	SPA; DNS	TUR	CHN	FRA; DNS	ITA; 18	CAT; 12	GBR; Ret	NED; 9	GER; 10	CZE; 10	SMR; 7	POR; Ret	JPN; 16	AUS; 11	MAL; 7	VAL; 13	13th	59
2008	250cc	Gilera	QAT; 8	SPA; 8	POR; Ret	CHN; 11	FRA; 13	ITA; 6	CAT; Ret	GBR; 11	NED; 9	GER; 10	CZE; 9	SMR; 4	INP; C	JPN; 10	AUS; 6	MAL; 7	VAL; 4	9th	110
2009	250cc	Gilera	QAT; 9	JPN; Ret	SPA; 9	FRA; 3	ITA; 10	CAT; Ret	NED; 5	GER; 10	GBR; 13	CZE; 5	INP; 5	SMR; Ret	POR; Ret	AUS; NC	MAL; Ret	VAL; 9		11th	85
