= 2009 French motorcycle Grand Prix =

(France) 2009 French Grand Prix
Race details
- Race 4 of 17 races in the 2009 Grand Prix motorcycle racing season
- Date: 17 May 2009
- Official name: Grand Prix de France
- Location: Bugatti Circuit
- Course: Permanent racing facility; 4.185 km (2.600 mi)

MotoGP
Pole position
- Rider: (Spain) Dani Pedrosa
- Time: 1:33.974
Fastest lap
- Rider: (Spain) Dani Pedrosa
- Time: 1:35.045
Podium
- First: (Spain) Jorge Lorenzo
- Second: (Italy) Marco Melandri
- Third: (Spain) Dani Pedrosa

250cc
Pole position
- Rider: (Spain) Álvaro Bautista
- Time: 1:38.270
Fastest lap
- Rider: (Spain) Alex Debón
- Time: 1:51.406
Podium
- First: (Italy) Marco Simoncelli
- Second: (Spain) Héctor Faubel
- Third: (Italy) Roberto Locatelli

125cc
Pole position
- Rider: (Spain) Marc Márquez
- Time: 1:47.080
Fastest lap
- Rider: (United Kingdom) Bradley Smith
- Time: 1:56.188
Podium
- First: (Spain) Julián Simón
- Second: (Germany) Jonas Folger
- Third: (Spain) Sergio Gadea

The 2009 French motorcycle Grand Prix was the fourth round of the 2009 Grand Prix motorcycle racing season. It took place on the weekend of 15–17 May 2009 at the Bugatti Circuit in Le Mans, France. Jorge Lorenzo moved one point clear at the top of world championship standings after winning the MotoGP race ahead of Marco Melandri and Dani Pedrosa.

== MotoGP classification ==
Pos.	No.	Rider	Team	Manufacturer	Laps	Time/Retired	Grid	Points
1	99	(Spain) Jorge Lorenzo	Fiat Yamaha Team	Yamaha	28	47:52.678	2	25
2	33	(Italy) Marco Melandri	Hayate Racing Team	Kawasaki	28	+17.710	9	20
3	3	(Spain) Dani Pedrosa	Repsol Honda Team	Honda	28	+19.893	1	16
4	4	(Italy) Andrea Dovizioso	Repsol Honda Team	Honda	28	+20.455	5	13
5	27	(Australia) Casey Stoner	Ducati Marlboro Team	Ducati	28	+30.539	3	11
6	7	(Australia) Chris Vermeulen	Rizla Suzuki MotoGP	Suzuki	28	+37.462	7	10
7	5	(United States) Colin Edwards	Monster Yamaha Tech 3	Yamaha	28	+40.191	6	9
8	65	(Italy) Loris Capirossi	Rizla Suzuki MotoGP	Suzuki	28	+45.421	8	8
9	52	(United Kingdom) James Toseland	Monster Yamaha Tech 3	Yamaha	28	+50.307	12	7
10	24	(Spain) Toni Elías	San Carlo Honda Gresini	Honda	28	+53.218	11	6
11	15	(San Marino) Alex de Angelis	San Carlo Honda Gresini	Honda	28	+53.550	16	5
12	69	(United States) Nicky Hayden	Ducati Marlboro Team	Ducati	28	+56.647	13	4
13	72	(Japan) Yuki Takahashi	Scot Racing Team MotoGP	Honda	28	+56.688	15	3
14	14	(France) Randy de Puniet	LCR Honda MotoGP	Honda	28	+1:11.299	10	2
15	88	(Italy) Niccolò Canepa	Pramac Racing	Ducati	28	+1:15.385	17	1
16	46	(Italy) Valentino Rossi	Fiat Yamaha Team	Yamaha	26	+2 laps	4	
Ret	36	(Finland) Mika Kallio	Pramac Racing	Ducati	11	Accident	14	
DNS	59	(Spain) Sete Gibernau	Grupo Francisco Hernando	Ducati		Did not start		

== 250 cc classification ==
Pos.	No.	Rider	Manufacturer	Laps	Time/Retired	Grid	Points
1	58	(Italy) Marco Simoncelli	Gilera	26	49:07.591	2	25
2	55	(Spain) Héctor Faubel	Honda	26	+18.128	10	20
3	15	(Italy) Roberto Locatelli	Gilera	26	+21.642	9	16
4	19	(Spain) Álvaro Bautista	Aprilia	26	+31.087	1	13
5	14	(Thailand) Ratthapark Wilairot	Honda	26	+50.497	12	11
6	35	(Italy) Raffaele De Rosa	Honda	26	+56.366	7	10
7	52	(Czech Republic) Lukáš Pešek	Aprilia	26	+1:16.025	8	9
8	4	(Japan) Hiroshi Aoyama	Honda	26	+1:22.882	3	8
9	10	(Hungary) Imre Tóth	Aprilia	26	+1:35.556	18	7
10	56	(Russia) Vladimir Leonov	Aprilia	26	+1:47.990	21	6
11	40	(Spain) Héctor Barberá	Aprilia	25	+1 lap	11	5
12	17	(Czech Republic) Karel Abraham	Aprilia	25	+1 lap	15	4
13	53	(France) Valentin Debise	Honda	25	+1 lap	19	3
14	54	(United Kingdom) Toby Markham	Honda	25	+1 lap	24	2
Ret	6	(Spain) Alex Debón	Aprilia	21	Accident	6	
Ret	25	(Italy) Alex Baldolini	Aprilia	18	Retirement	14	
Ret	12	(Switzerland) Thomas Lüthi	Aprilia	18	Retirement	4	
Ret	63	(France) Mike Di Meglio	Aprilia	10	Accident	5	
Ret	75	(Italy) Mattia Pasini	Aprilia	4	Accident	13	
Ret	7	(Spain) Axel Pons	Aprilia	3	Accident	20	
Ret	77	(Spain) Aitor Rodríguez	Aprilia	3	Accident	23	
Ret	47	(Spain) Ángel Rodríguez	Aprilia	2	Accident	16	
Ret	48	(Japan) Shoya Tomizawa	Honda	1	Retirement	17	
Ret	8	(Switzerland) Bastien Chesaux	Honda	0	Accident	22	
DNS	16	(France) Jules Cluzel	Aprilia		Did not start		
OFFICIAL 250cc REPORT

== 125 cc classification ==
Pos.	No.	Rider	Manufacturer	Laps	Time/Retired	Grid	Points
1	60	(Spain) Julián Simón	Aprilia	24	47:08.273	7	25
2	94	(Germany) Jonas Folger	Aprilia	24	+27.084	16	20
3	33	(Spain) Sergio Gadea	Aprilia	24	+30.916	12	16
4	38	(United Kingdom) Bradley Smith	Aprilia	24	+31.530	6	13
5	73	(Japan) Takaaki Nakagami	Aprilia	24	+1:09.235	31	11
6	77	(Switzerland) Dominique Aegerter	Derbi	24	+1:12.223	4	10
7	29	(Italy) Andrea Iannone	Aprilia	24	+1:13.063	23	9
8	7	(Spain) Efrén Vázquez	Derbi	24	+1:19.912	25	8
9	18	(Spain) Nicolás Terol	Aprilia	24	+1:40.036	3	7
10	8	(Italy) Lorenzo Zanetti	Aprilia	24	+1:42.700	20	6
11	12	(Spain) Esteve Rabat	Aprilia	24	+1:59.326	13	5
12	11	(Germany) Sandro Cortese	Derbi	23	+1 lap	24	4
13	53	(Netherlands) Jasper Iwema	Honda	23	+1 lap	30	3
14	48	(France) Grégory Di Carlo	Honda	23	+1 lap	28	2
15	35	(Switzerland) Randy Krummenacher	Aprilia	22	+2 laps	17	1
Ret	32	(Italy) Lorenzo Savadori	Aprilia	16	Accident	21	
Ret	17	(Germany) Stefan Bradl	Aprilia	14	Retirement	8	
Ret	45	(United Kingdom) Scott Redding	Aprilia	13	Retirement	2	
Ret	71	(Japan) Tomoyoshi Koyama	Loncin	10	Accident	9	
Ret	10	(Italy) Luca Vitali	Aprilia	10	Retirement	29	
Ret	16	(United States) Cameron Beaubier	KTM	8	Accident	11	
Ret	69	(Czech Republic) Lukáš Šembera	Aprilia	8	Accident	18	
Ret	93	(Spain) Marc Márquez	KTM	8	Retirement	1	
Ret	14	(France) Johann Zarco	Aprilia	8	Accident	32	
Ret	50	(Norway) Sturla Fagerhaug	KTM	6	Accident	33	
Ret	6	(Spain) Joan Olivé	Derbi	5	Accident	5	
Ret	44	(Spain) Pol Espargaró	Derbi	5	Retirement	15	
Ret	99	(United Kingdom) Danny Webb	Aprilia	4	Accident	10	
Ret	52	(France) Steven Le Coquen	Honda	4	Accident	22	
Ret	24	(Italy) Simone Corsi	Aprilia	2	Accident	19	
Ret	5	(France) Alexis Masbou	Loncin	2	Accident	14	
Ret	36	(France) Cyril Carrillo	Honda	1	Retirement	27	
Ret	87	(Italy) Luca Marconi	Aprilia	0	Accident	26	
DNQ	88	(Austria) Michael Ranseder	Haojue		Did not qualify		
DNQ	49	(France) Ornella Ongaro	Honda		Did not qualify		
DNQ	66	(United Kingdom) Matthew Hoyle	Haojue		Did not qualify		
OFFICIAL 125cc REPORT

== Championship standings after the race (MotoGP) ==
Below are the standings for the top five riders and constructors after round four has concluded.

Riders' Championship standings

Pos.	Rider	Points
1	(Spain) Jorge Lorenzo	66
2	(Italy) Valentino Rossi	65
3	(Australia) Casey Stoner	65
4	(Spain) Dani Pedrosa	57
5	(Italy) Marco Melandri	43

Constructors' Championship standings

Pos.	Constructor	Points
1	(Japan) Yamaha	95
2	(Italy) Ducati	65
3	(Japan) Honda	63
4	(Japan) Suzuki	43
5	(Japan) Kawasaki	38

- Note: Only the top five positions are included for both sets of standings.

Previous race: 2009 Spanish Grand Prix	FIM Grand Prix World Championship; 2009 season	Next race: 2009 Italian Grand Prix
Previous race: 2008 French Grand Prix	French motorcycle Grand Prix	Next race: 2010 French Grand Prix
