= 2010 European Superstock 600 Championship =

Motorcycle racing series

2010 European Superstock 600 Championship
| Previous: | 2009 | Next: | 2011 |
Support series: Superbike World Championship; Supersport World Championship; FIM Superstock 1000 Cup

The 2010 European Superstock 600 Championship was the sixth season of the European Superstock 600 Championship. The season was contested over tenth races, beginning at Algarve International Circuit on 28 March and ending at Circuit de Nevers Magny-Cours on 3 October. Frenchman Jérémy Guarnoni won the title after beating closest rival Florian Marino.

== Race calendar and results ==
2010 Calendar
| Round | Country | Circuit | Date | Pole position | Fastest lap | Winning rider | Winning team | Report |
|---|---|---|---|---|---|---|---|---|
| 1 | Portugal | Algarve International Circuit | 28 March | (France) Florian Marino | (Italy) Davide Fanelli | (France) Jérémy Guarnoni | MRS Racing | Report |
| 2 | Spain | Circuit Ricardo Tormo | 11 April | (France) Nelson Major | (France) Florian Marino | (France) Florian Marino | Ten Kate Race Junior | Report |
| 3 | Netherlands | TT Circuit Assen | 25 April | (France) Florian Marino | (France) Jérémy Guarnoni | (France) Florian Marino | Ten Kate Race Junior | Report |
| 4 | Italy | Autodromo Nazionale Monza | 9 May | (Italy) Federico D'Annunzio | (France) Florian Marino | (France) Jérémy Guarnoni | MRS Racing | Report |
| 5 | San Marino | Misano Circuit | 27 June | (France) Jérémy Guarnoni | (France) Jérémy Guarnoni | (France) Jérémy Guarnoni | MRS Racing | Report |
| 6 | Czech Republic | Brno Circuit | 11 July | (United Kingdom) Joshua Elliott | (France) Jérémy Guarnoni | (France) Jérémy Guarnoni | MRS Racing | Report |
| 7 | United Kingdom | Silverstone Circuit | 1 August | (France) Florian Marino | (France) Florian Marino | (United Kingdom) Luke Mossey | Sondelsport | Report |
| 8 | Germany | Nürburgring | 5 September | (Germany) Marc Moser | (France) Romain Lanusse | (France) Jérémy Guarnoni | MRS Racing | Report |
| 9 | Italy | Autodromo Enzo e Dino Ferrari | 26 September | (Italy) Giuliano Gregorini | (Argentina) Leandro Mercado | (France) Florian Marino | Ten Kate Race Junior | Report |
| 10 | France | Circuit de Nevers Magny-Cours | 3 October | (France) Jérémy Guarnoni | (Australia) Jed Metcher | (Australia) Jed Metcher | MTM Racing Team | Report |

== Entry list ==
| Team | Constructor | Motorcycle | No. | Rider | Rounds |
|---|---|---|---|---|---|
| All Service System by QDP | Honda | Honda CBR600RR | 27 | (Italy) Davide Fanelli | All |
| Coutelle Junior Team | Honda | Honda CBR600RR | 7 | (France) Jonathan Martinez | 10 |
| Coutelle Junior Team | Honda | Honda CBR600RR | 70 | (France) Clément Chevrier | 10 |
| LVRT Team Romania | Honda | Honda CBR600RR | 95 | (Romania) Robert Mureșan | 2 |
| Racedays | Honda | Honda CBR600RR | 9 | (United Kingdom) Joshua Elliott | 1–3 |
| Schacht Racing | Honda | Honda CBR600RR | 59 | (Denmark) Alex Schacht | 2, 6 |
| Ten Kate Race Junior | Honda | Honda CBR600RR | 21 | (France) Florian Marino | 1–9 |
| Ten Kate Race Junior | Honda | Honda CBR600RR | 121 | (Netherlands) Michael Van Der Mark | 10 |
| BWG Raciing | Kawasaki | Kawasaki ZX-6R | 36 | (Argentina) Leandro Mercado | 4–5, 9 |
| Direct CCTV Racedays; Racedays Kawasaki | Kawasaki | Kawasaki ZX-6R | 8 | (United Kingdom) Glenn Irwin | 9 |
| Direct CCTV Racedays; Racedays Kawasaki | Kawasaki | Kawasaki ZX-6R | 9 | (United Kingdom) Joshua Elliott | 4–8, 10 |
| Azione Corse | Triumph | Triumph Daytona 675 | 12 | (Italy) Riccardo Cecchini | 1–4 |
| Azione Corse | Triumph | Triumph Daytona 675 | 44 | (Italy) Michael Mazzina | 5–6 |
| Sport-Evolution | Triumph | Triumph Daytona 675 | 32 | (Germany) Marc Moser | 8 |
| Bike e Motor Racing Team | Yamaha | Yamaha YZF-R6 | 84 | (Italy) Riccardo Russo | 4–5, 9 |
| Bike Service R.T. | Yamaha | Yamaha YZF-R6 | 23 | (Italy) Luca Salvadori | 5, 9–10 |
| C.S.M. Bucharest | Yamaha | Yamaha YZF-R6 | 26 | (Romania) Mircea Vrajitoru | 1–2, 4–10 |
| Econocom | Yamaha | Yamaha YZF-R6 | 99 | (Netherlands) Tony Coveña | 1, 3–10 |
| Elle2Promotion | Yamaha | Yamaha YZF-R6 | 33 | (Italy) Giuliano Gregorini | 8–9 |
| Elle2Promotion | Yamaha | Yamaha YZF-R6 | 75 | (Italy) Francesco Cocco | 8–10 |
| Gentlemen Riders | Yamaha | Yamaha YZF-R6 | 71 | (France) Clive Rambure | 10 |
| IamaLoures Cetelem Yamaha | Yamaha | Yamaha YZF-R6 | 17 | (Portugal) André Carvalho | 1–2 |
| Jan Bühn Racing | Yamaha | Yamaha YZF-R6 | 45 | (Germany) Jan Bühn | 8 |
| Martini Corse | Yamaha | Yamaha YZF-R6 | 13 | (Italy) Dino Lombardi | All |
| Martini Corse | Yamaha | Yamaha YZF-R6 | 343 | (Italy) Federico D'Annunzio | 1–6, 8–10 |
| Media Action by Pro Race | Yamaha | Yamaha YZF-R6 | 77 | (Italy) Stefano Casalotti | 4 |
| Montez Broz Racing Team | Yamaha | Yamaha YZF-R6 | 82 | (Czech Republic) Karel Pešek | 3–6 |
| Moto82 | Yamaha | Yamaha YZF-R6 | 82 | (Czech Republic) Karel Pešek | 2 |
| Moto Club Piellemoto | Yamaha | Yamaha YZF-R6 | 15 | (Italy) Fabio Massei | 9 |
| Motorradtke Racing Team | Yamaha | Yamaha YZF-R6 | 14 | (Germany) Daniel Puffe | 8 |
| MRC Racing Team | Yamaha | Yamaha YZF-R6 | 111 | (Italy) Marco Rosini | 5 |
| MRS Racing | Yamaha | Yamaha YZF-R6 | 6 | (France) Romain Lanusse | All |
| MRS Racing | Yamaha | Yamaha YZF-R6 | 11 | (France) Jérémy Guarnoni | All |
| MTM Racing Team | Yamaha | Yamaha YZF-R6 | 3 | (Australia) Jed Metcher | 10 |
| MTM Racing Team | Yamaha | Yamaha YZF-R6 | 52 | (Belgium) Gauthier Duwelz | 1–5, 7–10 |
| MTM Racing Team | Yamaha | Yamaha YZF-R6 | 55 | (Belgium) Vincent Lonbois | 6 |
| MTM Racing Team | Yamaha | Yamaha YZF-R6 | 72 | (Norway) Frederik Karlsen | 1–9 |
| Orelac Racing | Yamaha | Yamaha YZF-R6 | 10 | (Spain) Nacho Calero | All |
| Pit Lane Federzoni Racing | Yamaha | Yamaha YZF-R6 | 30 | (Italy) Daniele Aloisi | 9 |
| Pit Lane Federzoni Racing | Yamaha | Yamaha YZF-R6 | 53 | (Italy) Nicola Jr. Morrentino | 9 |
| Soldelsport | Yamaha | Yamaha YZF-R6 | 41 | (United Kingdom) Luke Mossey | 7 |
| Start Racing | Yamaha | Yamaha YZF-R6 | 34 | (Netherlands) Kevin Van Leuven | 8, 10 |
| Team ASPI | Yamaha | Yamaha YZF-R6 | 22 | (France) Cyril Carrillo | 1–5 |
| Team ASPI | Yamaha | Yamaha YZF-R6 | 28 | (France) Steven Le Coquen | All |
| Team ASPI | Yamaha | Yamaha YZF-R6 | 43 | (France) Stéphane Egea | 9–10 |
| Team ASPI | Yamaha | Yamaha YZF-R6 | 66 | (France) Richard De Tournay | 6–8 |
| Team Trasimeno | Yamaha | Yamaha YZF-R6 | 69 | (France) Nelson Major | All |
| Tecmas | Yamaha | Yamaha YZF-R6 | 49 | (France) Morgan Esnault | 10 |
| TK Racing Slovakia | Yamaha | Yamaha YZF-R6 | 19 | (Slovakia) Tomáš Krajči | 2–10 |
| VFT Racing | Yamaha | Yamaha YZF-R6 | 222 | (Italy) Matteo Biancia | 5 |
| Willems Racing Team | Yamaha | Yamaha YZF-R6 | 81 | (Netherlands) Kevin Valk | 8 |
| Yamaha Poland Position | Yamaha | Yamaha YZF-R6 | 47 | (Poland) Mateusz Korobacz | 6 |

Key
Regular rider
Wildcard rider
Replacement rider

- All entries used Pirelli tyres.

== Championship' standings ==
=== Riders' standings ===
| Pos | Rider | Bike | POR (Portugal) | VAL (Spain) | ASS (Netherlands) | MNZ (Italy) | MIS (San Marino) | BRN (Czech Republic) | SIL (United Kingdom) | NÜR (Germany) | IMO (Italy) | MAG (France) | Pts |
|---|---|---|---|---|---|---|---|---|---|---|---|---|---|
| 1 | (France) Jérémy Guarnoni | Yamaha | 1 | 3 | 2 | 1 | **1** | 1 | 3 | 1 | 6 | **Ret** | 187 |
| 2 | (France) Florian Marino | Honda | **NC** | 1 | **1** | 3 | 2 | 2 | **2** | 8 | 1 | | 159 |
| 3 | (Italy) Dino Lombardi | Yamaha | 7 | 4 | 3 | Ret | 11 | 3 | 5 | 4 | 10 | 2 | 109 |
| 4 | (Italy) Federico D'Annunzio | Yamaha | 9 | 5 | 4 | **2** | 6 | 7 | | 7 | 13 | 6 | 92 |
| 5 | (Italy) Davide Fanelli | Honda | 5 | 6 | 12 | Ret | 4 | 4 | 4 | 9 | 7 | 19 | 80 |
| 6 | (Netherlands) Tony Coveña | Yamaha | DNS | | 7 | 8 | 16 | 11 | 10 | 2 | 11 | 3 | 69 |
| 7 | (France) Romain Lanusse | Yamaha | 2 | Ret | 6 | Ret | 7 | Ret | 11 | 3 | 8 | Ret | 68 |
| 8 | (Norway) Frederik Karlsen | Yamaha | 3 | 2 | 5 | Ret | 12 | Ret | DNS | 6 | 12 | | 65 |
| 9 | (Spain) Nacho Calero | Yamaha | 4 | Ret | 10 | 7 | 3 | Ret | 9 | WD | 18 | 8 | 59 |
| 10 | (United Kingdom) Joshua Elliott | Honda | 12 | 7 | 14 | | | | | | | | 44 |
| 10 | (United Kingdom) Joshua Elliott | Kawasaki | | | | Ret | 8 | **NC** | 8 | 18 | | 4 | 44 |
| 11 | (France) Steven Le Coquen | Yamaha | 15 | 9 | 13 | 6 | Ret | 5 | 6 | Ret | 15 | Ret | 43 |
| 12 | (France) Nelson Major | Yamaha | 8 | **12** | 8 | Ret | 9 | Ret | 12 | 14 | 9 | 18 | 40 |
| 13 | (Belgium) Gauthier Duwelz | Yamaha | 13 | 13 | 11 | Ret | Ret | | 7 | 12 | Ret | 5 | 35 |
| 14 | (Slovakia) Tomáš Krajči | Yamaha | | 8 | 15 | Ret | 10 | 8 | 15 | 16 | 20 | 11 | 29 |
| 15 | (United Kingdom) Luke Mossey | Yamaha | | | | | | | 1 | | | | 25 |
| 16 | (Australia) Jed Metcher | Yamaha | | | | | | | | | | 1 | 25 |
| 17 | (Italy) Riccardo Russo | Yamaha | | | | 4 | Ret | | | | 5 | | 24 |
| 18 | (Italy) Fabio Massei | Yamaha | | | | | | | | | 2 | | 20 |
| 19 | (Romania) Mircea Vrajitoru | Yamaha | 14 | 10 | | 9 | 15 | Ret | 13 | 19 | 19 | 15 | 20 |
| 20 | (Italy) Giuliano Gregorini | Yamaha | | | | | | | | Ret | **3** | | 16 |
| 21 | (France) Stéphane Egea | Yamaha | | | | | | | | | 4 | Ret | 13 |
| 22 | (France) Richard De Tournay | Yamaha | | | | | | 10 | 14 | 11 | | | 13 |
| 23 | (France) Cyril Carrillo | Yamaha | 11 | Ret | 9 | Ret | DNS | | | | | | 12 |
| 24 | (Italy) Stefano Casalotti | Yamaha | | | | 5 | | | | | | | 11 |
| 25 | (Argentina) Leandro Mercado | Kawasaki | | | | Ret | 5 | | | | Ret | | 11 |
| 26 | (Germany) Marc Moser | Triumph | | | | | | | | **5** | | | 11 |
| 27 | (Portugal) André Carvalho | Yamaha | 10 | 11 | | | | | | | | | 11 |
| 28 | (Italy) Riccardo Cecchini | Triumph | 6 | Ret | DNS | Ret | | | | | | | 10 |
| 29 | (Denmark) Alex Schacht | Honda | | Ret | | | | 6 | | | | | 10 |
| 30 | (Netherlands) Michael Van Der Mark | Honda | | | | | | | | | | 7 | 9 |
| 31 | (Italy) Francesco Cocco | Yamaha | | | | | | | | 15 | 17 | 9 | 8 |
| 32 | (Belgium) Vincent Lonbois | Yamaha | | | | | | 9 | | | | | 7 |
| 33 | (Germany) Jan Bühn | Yamaha | | | | | | | | 10 | | | 6 |
| 34 | (Netherlands) Kevin Van Leuven | Yamaha | | | | | | | | 17 | | 10 | 6 |
| 35 | (Italy) Michael Mazzina | Triumph | | | | | Ret | 12 | | | | | 4 |
| 36 | (Italy) Luca Salvadori | Yamaha | | | | | WD | | | | 16 | 12 | 4 |
| 37 | (Czech Republic) Karel Pešek | Yamaha | | Ret | 16 | WD | 13 | DNS | | | | | 3 |
| 38 | (Poland) Mateusz Korobacz | Yamaha | | | | | | 13 | | | | | 3 |
| 39 | (Netherlands) Kevin Valk | Yamaha | | | | | | | | 13 | | | 3 |
| 40 | (France) Clive Rambure | Yamaha | | | | | | | | | | 13 | 3 |
| 41 | (Romania) Robert Mureșan | Honda | | 14 | | | | | | | | | 2 |
| 42 | (Italy) Marco Rosini | Yamaha | | | | | 14 | | | | | | 2 |
| 43 | (Italy) Nicola Jr. Morrentino | Yamaha | | | | | | | | | 14 | | 2 |
| 44 | (France) Clément Chevrier | Honda | | | | | | | | | | 14 | 2 |
| | (France) Morgan Esnault | Yamaha | | | | | | | | | | 16 | 0 |
| | (Italy) Matteo Biancia | Yamaha | | | | | 17 | | | | | | 0 |
| | (France) Jonathan Martinez | Honda | | | | | | | | | | 17 | 0 |
| | (Germany) Daniel Puffe | Yamaha | | | | | | | | Ret | | | 0 |
| | (Italy) Daniele Aloisi | Yamaha | | | | | | | | | Ret | | 0 |
| | (United Kingdom) Glenn Irwin | Kawasaki | | | | | | | | | Ret | | 0 |
| Pos | Rider | Bike | POR (Portugal) | VAL (Spain) | ASS (Netherlands) | MNZ (Italy) | MIS (San Marino) | BRN (Czech Republic) | SIL (United Kingdom) | NÜR (Germany) | IMO (Italy) | MAG (France) | Pts |

| Colour | Result |
|---|---|
| Gold | Winner |
| Silver | Second place |
| Bronze | Third place |
| Green | Points classification |
| Blue | Non-points classification |
| Blue | Non-classified finish (NC) |
| Purple | Retired, not classified (Ret) |
| Red | Did not qualify (DNQ) |
| Red | Did not pre-qualify (DNPQ) |
| Black | Disqualified (DSQ) |
| White | Did not start (DNS) |
| White | Withdrew (WD) |
| White | Race cancelled (C) |
| Blank | Did not practice (DNP) |
| Blank | Did not arrive (DNA) |
| Blank | Excluded (EX) |

**Bold** – Pole position
Italics – Fastest lap
Source :
