= Lukáš Pešek =

Czech motorcycle racer

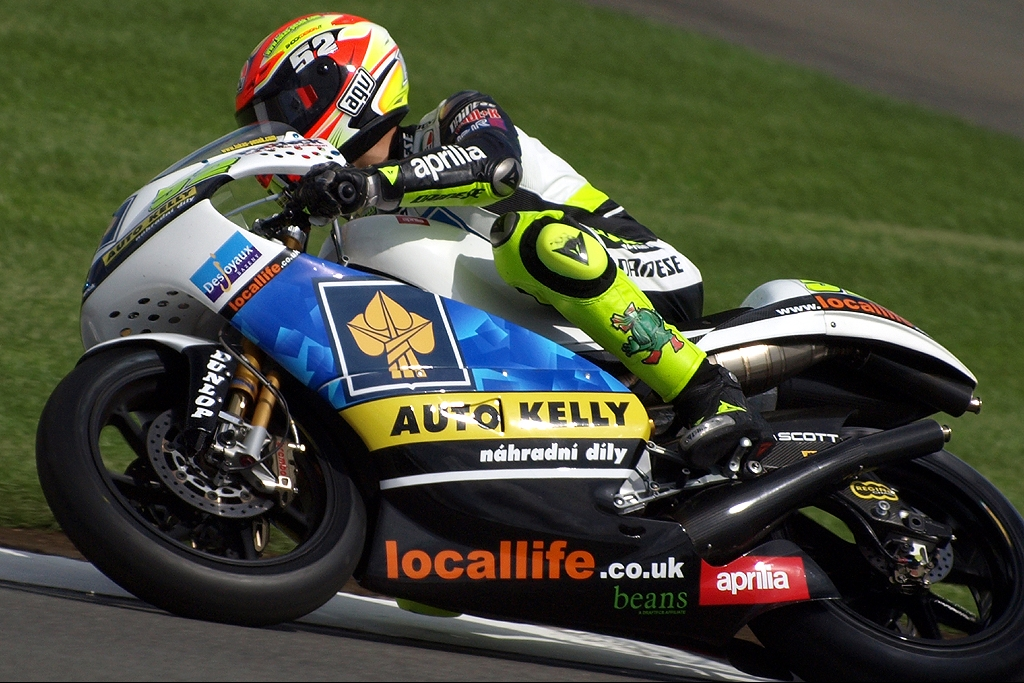
- Pešek at the 2009 British Grand Prix
- Nationality: Czech
- Born: 22 November 1985 (age 40); Prague, Czechoslovakia
- Current team: IVR Racing BMW Motorrad CSEU & Lukoil BMW Motorrad CSEU
- Bike number: 52
- Website: lukas-pesek.com
Motorcycle racing career statistics
MotoGP World Championship
Active years	2013
Manufacturers	Ioda-Suter
Championships	0
2013 championship position	NC (0 pts)
Starts / Wins / Podiums / Poles / F. laps / Points; 18 / 0 / 0 / 0 / 0 / 0
Moto2 World Championship
Active years	2010
Manufacturers	Moriwaki
Championships	0
2010 championship position	34th (5 pts)
Starts / Wins / Podiums / Poles / F. laps / Points; 11 / 0 / 0 / 0 / 0 / 5
250cc World Championship
Active years	2003, 2008–2009
Manufacturers	Yamaha, Aprilia
Championships	0
2009 championship position	15th (74 pts)
Starts / Wins / Podiums / Poles / F. laps / Points; 41 / 0 / 0 / 0 / 0 / 121
125cc World Championship
Active years	2002, 2004–2007
Manufacturers	Honda, Derbi
Championships	0
2007 championship position	4th (182 pts)
Starts / Wins / Podiums / Poles / F. laps / Points; 66 / 2 / 9 / 3 / 4 / 381

Lukáš Pešek (born 22 November 1985 in Prague, Czechoslovakia) is a Czech motorcycle racer. He competes in the Alpe Adria Road Race Superbike Championship and the Endurance FIM World Championship aboard a BMW S1000RR. He won the Alpe Adria Road Race Superbike Championship in 2016.

Having won Czech championships in 125 cc class in 2001 and 2002, when he also raced in European series, Pešek moved to European 250 cc championship in 2003. That year, he moved to World Championship mid-season, in order to replace his compatriot Jaroslav Huleš. He scored four points that year after finishing 12th in Phillip Island.

For 2004 season, Pešek moved back to 125 cc, this time at World Championship level. His season with Ajo Motorsport included many crashes. He scored a total of 20 points and was 21st in final standings.

Between 2005 and 2007, Pešek rode Derbi bikes. His performances improved year by year. In 2005, he was 19th, in 2006, he was sixth and in 2007, he was fourth. He has won two Grands Prix, the races at Shanghai and Phillip Island in 2007.

For 2008 season, Pešek moved to 250s full-time, finishing his début season fifteenth.

== Statistics ==
=== By season ===
Season	Class	Motorcycle	Team	Number	Race	Win	Pod	Pole	FLap	Pts	Plcd
2002	125cc	Honda	Kart Centrum	56	1	0	0	0	0	0	NC
2003	250cc	Yamaha	Yamaha Kurz	52	9	0	0	0	0	4	30th
2004	125cc	Honda	Ajo Motorsport	52	16	0	0	0	0	20	21st
2005	125cc	Derbi	Metis Racing Team	52	16	0	0	0	0	25	19th
2006	125cc	Derbi	Derbi Racing	52	16	0	3	2	1	154	6th
2007	125cc	Derbi	Valsir Seedorf Derbi	52	17	2	6	1	3	182	4th
2008	250cc	Aprilia	Auto Kelly - CP	52	16	0	0	0	0	43	15th
2009	250cc	Aprilia	Auto Kelly - CP	52	16	0	0	0	0	74	15th
2010	Moto2	Moriwaki	Matteoni CP Racing	52	11	0	0	0	0	5	34th
2013	MotoGP	Ioda-Suter	Came IodaRacing Project	52	18	0	0	0	0	0	NC
Total					**136**	**2**	**9**	**3**	**4**	**507**	

=== Races by year ===
(key) (Races in bold indicate pole position, races in italics indicate fastest lap)

Year	Class	Bike	1	2	3	4	5	6	7	8	9	10	11	12	13	14	15	16	17	18	Pos	Pts
2002	125cc	Honda	JPN	RSA	SPA	FRA	ITA	CAT	NED	GBR	GER	CZE; Ret	POR	BRA	PAC	MAL	AUS	VAL			NC	0
2003	250cc	Yamaha	JPN	RSA	SPA	FRA	ITA	CAT; 16	NED	GBR	GER; 16	CZE; 17	POR; Ret	BRA; 17	PAC; Ret	MAL; Ret	AUS; 12	VAL; 19			30th	4
2004	125cc	Honda	RSA; 20	SPA; Ret	FRA; 14	ITA; 15	CAT; Ret	NED; Ret	BRA; 15	GER; 17	GBR; 12	CZE; Ret	POR; 8	JPN; Ret	QAT; 17	MAL; Ret	AUS; 12	VAL; Ret			21st	20
2005	125cc	Derbi	SPA; Ret	POR; Ret	CHN; 9	FRA; Ret	ITA; Ret	CAT; Ret	NED; 15	GBR; Ret	GER; 6	CZE; Ret	JPN; Ret	MAL; 12	QAT; Ret	AUS; Ret	TUR; 13	VAL; Ret			19th	25
2006	125cc	Derbi	SPA; 2	QAT; Ret	TUR; 7	CHN; 6	FRA; Ret	**ITA**; 3	CAT; 5	NED; 5	GBR; 7	**GER**; 3	CZE; Ret	MAL; 9	AUS; 6	JPN; 5	POR; 4	VAL; 5			6th	154
2007	125cc	Derbi	QAT; 3	SPA; 2	TUR; 6	CHN; 1	FRA; 2	ITA; Ret	CAT; 13	GBR; 18	NED; 7	GER; 4	CZE; 3	**RSM**; 20	POR; 13	JPN; 12	AUS; 1	MAL; 6	VAL; 5		4th	182
2008	250cc	Aprilia	QAT; Ret	SPA; 10	POR; 10	CHN; Ret	FRA; Ret	ITA; Ret	CAT; 10	GBR; 13	NED; 15	GER; Ret	CZE; 14	RSM; 9	INP; C	JPN; 12	AUS; 14	MAL; 10	VAL; Ret		15th	43
2009	250cc	Aprilia	QAT; 13	JPN; 7	SPA; 13	FRA; 7	ITA; Ret	CAT; 12	NED; 12	GER; 12	GBR; 12	CZE; 12	INP; 7	RSM; Ret	POR; 11	AUS; 12	MAL; 8	VAL; 12			14th	74
2010	Moto2	Moriwaki	QAT; 15	SPA; 26	FRA; 13	ITA; Ret	GBR; 20	NED; Ret	CAT; Ret	GER; Ret	CZE; Ret	INP; 20	RSM; 15	ARA	JPN	MAL	AUS	POR	VAL		34th	5
2013	MotoGP	Ioda-Suter	QAT; 18	AME; Ret	SPA; Ret	FRA; Ret	ITA; 19	CAT; 16	NED; Ret	GER; 19	USA; 18	INP; Ret	CZE; Ret	GBR; Ret	RSM; Ret	ARA; 19	MAL; Ret	AUS; 19	JPN; Ret	VAL; Ret	NC	0
