= Robert Mureșan =

Romanian motorcycle road racer

Robert Mureşan
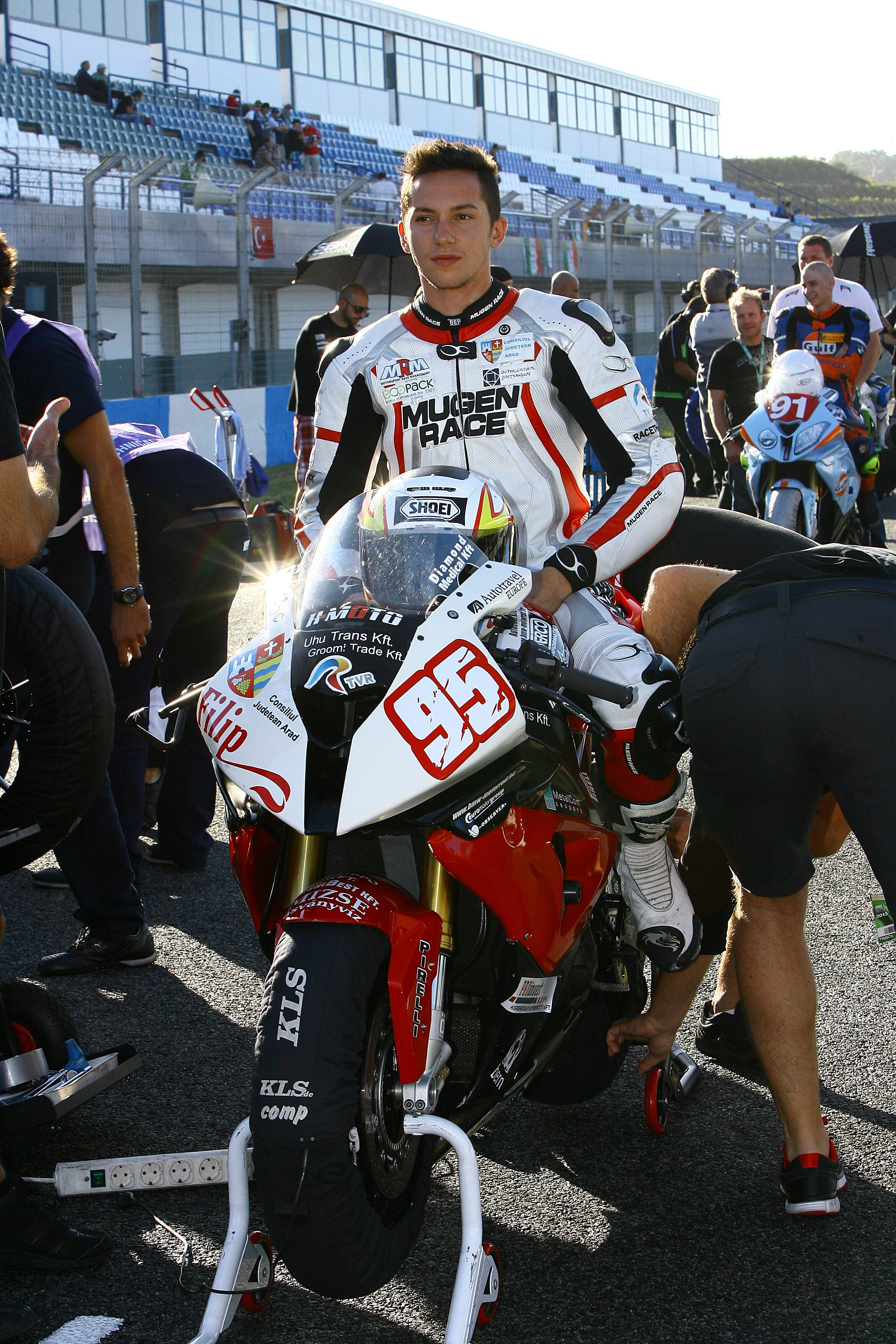
- Robert Mureşan
- Nationality: (Romania)
- Born: 22 March 1991 (age 35); Arad, Romania
- Current team: H-Moto Team
- Bike number: 95

Robert Mureşan (born 22 March 1991 in Arad, Romania) is a Romanian Grand Prix motorcycle road racer. He races in the Romanian Superbike Championship aboard a BMW S1000RR.

== Early years ==
- 2001: national champion on juniors III class
- 2002: national runner-up on juniors II class
- 2003: national champion on 125cmc class
- 2004: national runner-up on 125cc GP and Balkan champion on 125cmc GP
- 2005: 3rd place on Central Europe Championship and 5th in the Austrian Championship, both on general

== Moto GP ==
Mureșan competed in 125GP class for three years (2006, 2007 & 2008).

== Supersport ==
Mureșan made his debut in the 600cc class of Supersport World Championship in 2009.

In 2011, Mureşan would ride for the Romanian team Performance Technical Racing Romania alongside the Romanian Cătălin Cazacu in the 600cc class of Supersport World Championship.

== Career statistics ==
=== Career highlights ===
2010 - 41st, European Superstock 600 Championship, Honda CBR600RR
2013 - NC, FIM Superstock 1000 Cup, BMW S1000RR

- 2014 - 13th, FIM Superstock 1000 Cup, BMW S1000RR
- 2015 - 34th, FIM Superstock 1000 Cup, BMW S1000RR

=== Grand Prix motorcycle results ===
==== By season ====
Season	Class	Motorcycle	Team	Number	Race	Win	Podium	Pole	FLap	Pts	Plcd
2006	125cc	Aprilia	Las Vegas Team Romania	81	2	0	0	0	0	0	NC
2006	125cc	Aprilia	Team Toth	81	2	0	0	0	0	0	NC
2007	125cc	Derbi	Ajo Motorsport	95	16	0	0	0	0	0	NC
2008	125cc	Aprilia	Grizzly Gas Kiefer Racing	95	16	0	0	0	0	0	NC
Total					**34**	**0**	**0**	**0**	**0**	**0**	

==== Races by year ====
Year	Class	Bike	1	2	3	4	5	6	7	8	9	10	11	12	13	14	15	16	17	Pos	Points
2006	125cc	Aprilia	SPA	QAT	TUR	CHN	FRA	ITA	CAT	NED; 32	GBR	GER	CZE; 27	MAL	AUS	JPN	POR	VAL		NC	0
2007	125cc	Derbi	QAT; Ret	SPA; 18	TUR; 22	CHN; 26	FRA; 23	ITA; 19	CAT; 24	GBR; 16	NED; Ret	GER; 17	CZE; Ret	RSM; 29	POR; 23	JPN; Ret	AUS	MAL; 23	VAL; 22	NC	0
2008	125cc	Aprilia	QAT; Ret	SPA; 26	POR; 24	CHN; Ret	FRA; 22	ITA; 34	CAT; 24	GBR; 24	NED; 25	GER; 22	CZE; 27	RSM	IND; 25	JPN; Ret	AUS; Ret	MAL; 22	VAL; 21	NC	0

=== European Superstock 600 ===
==== Races by year ====
(key) (Races in bold indicate pole position, races in italics indicate fastest lap)

Year	Bike	1	2	3	4	5	6	7	8	9	10	Pos	Pts
2010	Honda	POR	VAL; 14	ASS	MNZ	MIS	BRN	SIL	NÜR	IMO	MAG	41st	2

=== Superstock 1000 Cup ===
==== Races by year ====
(key) (Races in bold indicate pole position) (Races in italics indicate fastest lap)

Year	Bike	1	2	3	4	5	6	7	8	9	10	Pos	Pts
2013	BMW	ARA	NED	MNZ	ALG	IMO	SIL	SIL	NŰR; 17	MAG	JER; 17	NC	0
2014	BMW	ARA; Ret	NED; Ret	IMO; 8	MIS; 13	ALG; 12	JER; 10	MAG; Ret				13th	21
2015	BMW	ARA	NED	IMO	DON	ALG	MIS; 15	JER	MAG			35th	1
