= 2008 French motorcycle Grand Prix =

Motorcycle race

(France) 2008 French Grand Prix
Race details
- Race 5 of 18 races in the 2008 Grand Prix motorcycle racing season
- Date: 18 May 2008
- Official name: Alice Grand Prix de France
- Location: Bugatti Circuit
- Course: Permanent racing facility; 4.185 km (2.600 mi)

MotoGP
Pole position
- Rider: (Spain) Dani Pedrosa
- Time: 1:32.647
Fastest lap
- Rider: (Italy) Valentino Rossi
- Time: 1:34.215
Podium
- First: (Italy) Valentino Rossi
- Second: (Spain) Jorge Lorenzo
- Third: (United States) Colin Edwards

250cc
Pole position
- Rider: (Spain) Alex Debón
- Time: 1:38.478
Fastest lap
- Rider: (Italy) Marco Simoncelli
- Time: 1:39.666
Podium
- First: (Spain) Alex Debón
- Second: (Italy) Marco Simoncelli
- Third: (Italy) Mattia Pasini

125cc
Pole position
- Rider: (Spain) Sergio Gadea
- Time: 1:43.515
Fastest lap
- Rider: (Spain) Pol Espargaró
- Time: 1:43.918
Podium
- First: (France) Mike Di Meglio
- Second: (United Kingdom) Bradley Smith
- Third: (Spain) Nicolás Terol

The 2008 French motorcycle Grand Prix was the fifth round of the 2008 MotoGP Championship. It took place on the weekend of 16–18 May 2008 at the Le Mans Bugatti Circuit. It was also the final all-Yamaha podium until the 2014 Australian motorcycle Grand Prix.

== MotoGP classification ==
Pos.	No.	Rider	Team	Manufacturer	Laps	Time/Retired	Grid	Points
1	46	(Italy) Valentino Rossi	Fiat Yamaha Team	Yamaha	28	44:30.799	4	25
2	48	(Spain) Jorge Lorenzo	Fiat Yamaha Team	Yamaha	28	+4.997	5	20
3	5	(United States) Colin Edwards	Tech 3 Yamaha	Yamaha	28	+6.805	2	16
4	2	(Spain) Dani Pedrosa	Repsol Honda Team	Honda	28	+10.157	1	13
5	7	(Australia) Chris Vermeulen	Rizla Suzuki MotoGP	Suzuki	28	+21.762	8	11
6	4	(Italy) Andrea Dovizioso	JiR Team Scot MotoGP	Honda	28	+22.395	10	10
7	65	(Italy) Loris Capirossi	Rizla Suzuki MotoGP	Suzuki	28	+27.806	11	9
8	69	(United States) Nicky Hayden	Repsol Honda Team	Honda	28	+27.995	6	8
9	14	(France) Randy de Puniet	LCR Honda MotoGP	Honda	28	+29.344	12	7
10	56	(Japan) Shinya Nakano	San Carlo Honda Gresini	Honda	28	+30.822	13	6
11	24	(Spain) Toni Elías	Alice Team	Ducati	28	+35.154	14	5
12	15	(San Marino) Alex de Angelis	San Carlo Honda Gresini	Honda	28	+36.216	15	4
13	50	(France) Sylvain Guintoli	Alice Team	Ducati	28	+52.038	16	3
14	13	(Australia) Anthony West	Kawasaki Racing Team	Kawasaki	28	+1:29.307	18	2
15	33	(Italy) Marco Melandri	Ducati Marlboro Team	Ducati	27	+1 lap	17	1
16	1	(Australia) Casey Stoner	Ducati Marlboro Team	Ducati	26	+2 laps	3	
Ret	21	(United States) John Hopkins	Kawasaki Racing Team	Kawasaki	16	Broken Chain	9	
Ret	52	(United Kingdom) James Toseland	Tech 3 Yamaha	Yamaha	2	Accident	7	

== 250 cc classification ==
Pos.	No.	Rider	Manufacturer	Laps	Time/Retired	Grid	Points
1	6	(Spain) Alex Debón	Aprilia	26	47:27.406	1	25
2	58	(Italy) Marco Simoncelli	Gilera	26	+4.816	3	20
3	75	(Italy) Mattia Pasini	Aprilia	26	+4.998	6	16
4	72	(Japan) Yuki Takahashi	Honda	26	+5.770	12	13
5	36	(Finland) Mika Kallio	KTM	26	+6.197	5	11
6	54	(San Marino) Manuel Poggiali	Gilera	26	+6.474	8	10
7	4	(Japan) Hiroshi Aoyama	KTM	26	+14.909	10	9
8	60	(Spain) Julián Simón	KTM	26	+17.526	7	8
9	41	(Spain) Aleix Espargaró	Aprilia	26	+32.925	9	7
10	55	(Spain) Héctor Faubel	Aprilia	26	+36.719	13	6
11	12	(Switzerland) Thomas Lüthi	Aprilia	26	+48.968	4	5
12	21	(Spain) Héctor Barberá	Aprilia	26	+56.837	11	4
13	15	(Italy) Roberto Locatelli	Gilera	26	+57.827	17	3
14	19	(Spain) Álvaro Bautista	Aprilia	26	+1:05.407	2	2
15	14	(Thailand) Ratthapark Wilairot	Honda	26	+1:24.336	16	1
16	25	(Italy) Alex Baldolini	Aprilia	26	+1:24.577	21	
17	90	(Italy) Federico Sandi	Aprilia	25	+1 lap	20	
18	10	(Hungary) Imre Tóth	Aprilia	25	+1 lap	22	
19	7	(Spain) Russell Gómez	Aprilia	25	+1 lap	23	
Ret	17	(Czech Republic) Karel Abraham	Aprilia	24	Accident	19	
Ret	45	(Indonesia) Doni Tata Pradita	Yamaha	24	Accident	24	
Ret	52	(Czech Republic) Lukáš Pešek	Aprilia	21	Retirement	15	
Ret	32	(Italy) Fabrizio Lai	Gilera	13	Retirement	14	
Ret	50	(Republic of Ireland) Eugene Laverty	Aprilia	11	Accident	18	
DNQ	89	(China) Ho Wan Chow	Aprilia		Did not qualify		
OFFICIAL 250cc REPORT

== 125 cc classification ==
The race was stopped after 14 laps due to rain. It was later restarted for 5 additional laps, with the grid determined by the running order before the suspension. The second part of the race determined the final result.

Pos.	No.	Rider	Manufacturer	Laps	Time/Retired	Grid	Points
1	63	(France) Mike Di Meglio	Derbi	5	10:08.574	6	25
2	38	(United Kingdom) Bradley Smith	Aprilia	5	+0.800	2	20
3	18	(Spain) Nicolás Terol	Aprilia	5	+3.077	7	16
4	44	(Spain) Pol Espargaró	Derbi	5	+10.407	10	13
5	29	(Italy) Andrea Iannone	Aprilia	5	+11.697	18	11
6	17	(Germany) Stefan Bradl	Aprilia	5	+11.881	3	10
7	8	(Italy) Lorenzo Zanetti	KTM	5	+16.372	23	9
8	6	(Spain) Joan Olivé	Derbi	5	+16.545	11	8
9	35	(Italy) Raffaele De Rosa	KTM	5	+19.163	17	7
10	34	(Switzerland) Randy Krummenacher	KTM	5	+22.391	30	6
11	11	(Germany) Sandro Cortese	Aprilia	5	+22.847	5	5
12	30	(Spain) Pere Tutusaus	Aprilia	5	+23.195	29	4
13	24	(Italy) Simone Corsi	Aprilia	5	+23.553	4	3
14	1	(Hungary) Gábor Talmácsi	Aprilia	5	+23.695	8	2
15	5	(France) Alexis Masbou	Loncin	5	+24.240	19	1
16	73	(Japan) Takaaki Nakagami	Aprilia	5	+26.196	22	
17	12	(Spain) Esteve Rabat	KTM	5	+26.411	9	
18	19	(Italy) Roberto Lacalendola	Aprilia	5	+26.895	36	
19	69	(France) Louis Rossi	Honda	5	+27.446	34	
20	33	(Spain) Sergio Gadea	Aprilia	5	+31.829	1	
21	99	(United Kingdom) Danny Webb	Aprilia	5	+34.810	15	
22	95	(Romania) Robert Mureșan	Aprilia	5	+35.190	28	
23	77	(Switzerland) Dominique Aegerter	Derbi	5	+47.840	27	
Ret	60	(Austria) Michael Ranseder	Aprilia	4	Retirement	16	
Ret	21	(Germany) Robin Lässer	Aprilia	2	Accident	33	
Ret	52	(France) Steven Le Coquen	Honda	1	Accident	31	
Ret	61	(Italy) Gioele Pellino	Loncin	1	Accident	35	
Ret	27	(Italy) Stefano Bianco	Aprilia	0	Accident	21	
Ret	41	(Germany) Tobias Siegert	Aprilia	0	Did not start second race	37	
Ret	22	(Spain) Pablo Nieto	KTM	0	Not classified in first race	25	
Ret	36	(France) Cyril Carrillo	Honda	0	Did not finish first race	32	
Ret	51	(United States) Stevie Bonsey	Aprilia	0	Did not finish first race	13	
Ret	7	(Spain) Efrén Vázquez	Aprilia	0	Did not finish first race	24	
Ret	93	(Spain) Marc Márquez	KTM	0	Did not finish first race	20	
Ret	71	(Japan) Tomoyoshi Koyama	KTM	0	Did not finish first race	14	
Ret	45	(United Kingdom) Scott Redding	Aprilia	0	Did not finish first race	12	
Ret	56	(Netherlands) Hugo van den Berg	Aprilia	0	Did not finish first race	26	
DNS	53	(France) Valentin Debise	KTM		Did not start		
OFFICIAL 125cc REPORT

== Championship standings after the race (MotoGP) ==
Below are the standings for the top five riders and constructors after round five has concluded.

Riders' Championship standings

Pos.	Rider	Points
1	(Italy) Valentino Rossi	97
2	(Spain) Jorge Lorenzo	94
3	(Spain) Dani Pedrosa	94
4	(Australia) Casey Stoner	56
5	(United States) Colin Edwards	47

Constructors' Championship standings

Pos.	Constructor	Points
1	(Japan) Yamaha	115
2	(Japan) Honda	94
3	(Italy) Ducati	61
4	(Japan) Suzuki	45
5	(Japan) Kawasaki	28

- Note: Only the top five positions are included for both sets of standings.

Previous race: 2008 Chinese Grand Prix	FIM Grand Prix World Championship; 2008 season	Next race: 2008 Italian Grand Prix
Previous race: 2007 French Grand Prix	French motorcycle Grand Prix	Next race: 2009 French Grand Prix
