= 2008 Australian motorcycle Grand Prix =

Australian motorcycle Grand Prix

Coordinates: 38°30′11.5″S 145°14′1″E

(Australia) 2008 Australian Grand Prix
Race details
- Race 16 of 18 races in the 2008 Grand Prix motorcycle racing season
- Date: 5 October 2008
- Official name: Australian Grand Prix
- Location: Phillip Island Grand Prix Circuit
- Course: Permanent racing facility; 4.448 km (2.764 mi)

MotoGP
Pole position
- Rider: (Australia) Casey Stoner
- Time: 1:28.665
Fastest lap
- Rider: (United States) Nicky Hayden
- Time: 1:30.059
Podium
- First: (Australia) Casey Stoner
- Second: (Italy) Valentino Rossi
- Third: (United States) Nicky Hayden

250cc
Pole position
- Rider: (Italy) Marco Simoncelli
- Time: 1:32.075
Fastest lap
- Rider: (Spain) Álvaro Bautista
- Time: 1:32.710
Podium
- First: (Italy) Marco Simoncelli
- Second: (Spain) Álvaro Bautista
- Third: (Finland) Mika Kallio

125cc
Pole position
- Rider: (France) Mike Di Meglio
- Time: 1:37.553
Fastest lap
- Rider: (Germany) Stefan Bradl
- Time: 1:37.908
Podium
- First: (France) Mike Di Meglio
- Second: (Germany) Stefan Bradl
- Third: (Hungary) Gábor Talmácsi

The 2008 Australian motorcycle Grand Prix was the sixteenth round of the 2008 MotoGP Championship. It took place on the weekend of 3–5 October 2008 at the Phillip Island Grand Prix Circuit.

== Race report ==
The premier class MotoGP race was won by Casey Stoner from pole position. Stoner rode a lights to flag victory ahead of a fast and charging Valentino Rossi who started the race from 12th position on the grid. Nicky Hayden rounded out the podium finishing in a respectable third place.

In the early stages of the race, Stoner and Hayden had a battle that lasted many laps with the two pulling away from the chasing pack, trading fast laps between them. Casey Stoner gradually began to pull away as Hayden's tyres appeared to wear out slightly. Meanwhile, Rossi was charging through the midfield, getting up to 8th position after only the first lap. Rossi quickly disposed of a number of riders in the first few laps, but lost vital time while attempting to overtake his teammate Jorge Lorenzo and former SBK champion James Toseland. Rossi was setting fast lap times but his entertaining battle with these two riders meant he was losing time, and all chances of catching Stoner and Hayden who were riding off into the distance were slowly fading.

After losing the front end going in MG Corner just after Lukey Heights, Rossi lost yet more time. After a few laps he managed to get into the tow behind Toseland and past him going into the long sweeping turn 1. Toseland had no reply and Rossi had his eyes firmly set on catching the leaders. Rossi caught Hayden with only 2 laps to go, but Stoner was simply too far already to be challenged for the win. By this stage of the race, Hayden's rear tyre was very worn as he had not conserved it in the early stages of the race. Rossi pulled a textbook move going into turn 1 on the last lap, Hayden lost ground from here and could not get close enough to attempt to retake second place.

== MotoGP classification ==
Pos.	No.	Rider	Team	Manufacturer	Laps	Time/Retired	Grid	Points
1	1	(Australia) Casey Stoner	Ducati Marlboro Team	Ducati	27	40:56.643	1	25
2	46	(Italy) Valentino Rossi	Fiat Yamaha Team	Yamaha	27	+6.504	12	20
3	69	(United States) Nicky Hayden	Repsol Honda Team	Honda	27	+7.205	3	16
4	48	(Spain) Jorge Lorenzo	Fiat Yamaha Team	Yamaha	27	+11.500	2	13
5	56	(Japan) Shinya Nakano	San Carlo Honda Gresini	Honda	27	+11.914	9	11
6	52	(United Kingdom) James Toseland	Tech 3 Yamaha	Yamaha	27	+12.243	5	10
7	4	(Italy) Andrea Dovizioso	JiR Team Scot MotoGP	Honda	27	+12.780	8	9
8	5	(United States) Colin Edwards	Tech 3 Yamaha	Yamaha	27	+25.920	7	8
9	14	(France) Randy de Puniet	LCR Honda MotoGP	Honda	27	+26.037	4	7
10	65	(Italy) Loris Capirossi	Rizla Suzuki MotoGP	Suzuki	27	+26.799	11	6
11	24	(Spain) Toni Elías	Alice Team	Ducati	27	+27.027	13	5
12	13	(Australia) Anthony West	Kawasaki Racing Team	Kawasaki	27	+47.808	18	4
13	21	(United States) John Hopkins	Kawasaki Racing Team	Kawasaki	27	+48.333	16	3
14	50	(France) Sylvain Guintoli	Alice Team	Ducati	27	+48.899	14	2
15	7	(Australia) Chris Vermeulen	Rizla Suzuki MotoGP	Suzuki	27	+48.935	15	1
16	33	(Italy) Marco Melandri	Ducati Marlboro Team	Ducati	27	+1:11.767	17	
Ret	15	(San Marino) Alex de Angelis	San Carlo Honda Gresini	Honda	0	Accident	10	
Ret	2	(Spain) Dani Pedrosa	Repsol Honda Team	Honda	0	Accident	6	

== 250 cc classification ==
Pos.	No.	Rider	Manufacturer	Laps	Time/Retired	Grid	Points
1	58	(Italy) Marco Simoncelli	Gilera	25	39:02.553	1	25
2	19	(Spain) Álvaro Bautista	Aprilia	25	+0.223	3	20
3	36	(Finland) Mika Kallio	KTM	25	+14.450	2	16
4	60	(Spain) Julián Simón	KTM	25	+14.478	6	13
5	6	(Spain) Alex Debón	Aprilia	25	+26.226	8	11
6	15	(Italy) Roberto Locatelli	Gilera	25	+26.392	11	10
7	72	(Japan) Yuki Takahashi	Honda	25	+26.434	7	9
8	41	(Spain) Aleix Espargaró	Aprilia	25	+40.546	9	8
9	14	(Thailand) Ratthapark Wilairot	Honda	25	+1:00.219	12	7
10	32	(Italy) Fabrizio Lai	Gilera	25	+1:20.825	13	6
11	17	(Czech Republic) Karel Abraham	Aprilia	25	+1:22.802	17	5
12	25	(Italy) Alex Baldolini	Aprilia	25	+1:22.864	18	4
13	10	(Hungary) Imre Tóth	Aprilia	25	+1:23.995	16	3
14	52	(Czech Republic) Lukáš Pešek	Aprilia	25	+1:39.740	14	2
15	35	(Italy) Simone Grotzkyj	Gilera	24	+1 lap	21	1
16	92	(Spain) Daniel Arcas	Aprilia	24	+1 lap	20	
17	45	(Indonesia) Doni Tata Pradita	Yamaha	24	+1 lap	22	
Ret	4	(Japan) Hiroshi Aoyama	KTM	15	Retirement	4	
Ret	75	(Italy) Mattia Pasini	Aprilia	15	Accident	10	
Ret	55	(Spain) Héctor Faubel	Aprilia	4	Accident	5	
Ret	90	(Italy) Federico Sandi	Aprilia	1	Accident	15	
Ret	43	(Spain) Manuel Hernández	Aprilia	1	Retirement	19	
DNQ	89	(China) Ho Wan Chow	Aprilia		Did not qualify		
DNQ	27	(Italy) Stefano Bianco	Aprilia		Did not qualify		
OFFICIAL 250cc REPORT

== 125 cc classification ==
Pos.	No.	Rider	Manufacturer	Laps	Time/Retired	Grid	Points
1	63	(France) Mike Di Meglio	Derbi	23	37:55.589	1	25
2	17	(Germany) Stefan Bradl	Aprilia	23	+10.255	3	20
3	1	(Hungary) Gábor Talmácsi	Aprilia	23	+13.106	9	16
4	29	(Italy) Andrea Iannone	Aprilia	23	+13.149	5	13
5	44	(Spain) Pol Espargaró	Derbi	23	+26.796	15	11
6	11	(Germany) Sandro Cortese	Aprilia	23	+27.123	6	10
7	12	(Spain) Esteve Rabat	KTM	23	+27.181	17	9
8	24	(Italy) Simone Corsi	Aprilia	23	+27.871	8	8
9	93	(Spain) Marc Márquez	KTM	23	+28.287 (Note: Marc Márquez received a 1-second penalty.)	12	7
10	45	(United Kingdom) Scott Redding	Aprilia	23	+35.087	11	6
11	7	(Spain) Efrén Vázquez	Aprilia	23	+57.392	25	5
12	8	(Italy) Lorenzo Zanetti	KTM	23	+57.413	19	4
13	22	(Spain) Pablo Nieto	KTM	23	+57.451	16	3
14	6	(Spain) Joan Olivé	Derbi	23	+57.539	18	2
15	21	(Germany) Robin Lässer	Aprilia	23	+1:06.318	23	1
16	72	(Italy) Marco Ravaioli	Aprilia	23	+1:06.320	29	
17	26	(Spain) Adrián Martín	Aprilia	23	+1:42.441	30	
18	36	(France) Cyril Carrillo	Honda	23	+1:42.455	31	
19	28	(Spain) Enrique Jerez	KTM	23	+1:43.792	32	
20	91	(Australia) Jed Metcher	Honda	22	+1 lap	33	
21	34	(Switzerland) Randy Krummenacher	KTM	21	+2 laps	20	
Ret	38	(United Kingdom) Bradley Smith	Aprilia	21	Accident	2	
Ret	48	(Switzerland) Bastien Chesaux	Aprilia	14	Retirement	28	
Ret	33	(Spain) Sergio Gadea	Aprilia	13	Retirement	14	
Ret	51	(United States) Stevie Bonsey	Aprilia	12	Retirement	13	
Ret	70	(Australia) Rhys Moller	Honda	10	Accident	34	
Ret	16	(France) Jules Cluzel	Loncin	8	Accident	27	
Ret	46	(Australia) Brad Gross	Yamaha	8	Retirement	35	
Ret	56	(Netherlands) Hugo van den Berg	Aprilia	7	Accident	21	
Ret	95	(Romania) Robert Mureșan	Aprilia	2	Accident	24	
Ret	35	(Italy) Raffaele De Rosa	KTM	2	Accident	7	
Ret	5	(France) Alexis Masbou	Loncin	1	Retirement	22	
Ret	18	(Spain) Nicolás Terol	Aprilia	1	Retirement	4	
Ret	73	(Japan) Takaaki Nakagami	Aprilia	0	Retirement	26	
Ret	77	(Switzerland) Dominique Aegerter	Derbi	0	Accident	10	
DNS	99	(United Kingdom) Danny Webb	Aprilia		Did not start		
DNQ	32	(Australia) Blake Leigh-Smith	Honda		Did not qualify		
DNQ	92	(Australia) Jake Horne	Honda		Did not qualify		
DNQ	60	(Austria) Michael Ranseder	Aprilia		Did not qualify		
OFFICIAL 125cc REPORT

== Championship standings after the race (MotoGP) ==
Below are the standings for the top five riders and constructors after round sixteen has concluded.

Riders' Championship standings

Pos.	Rider	Points
1	(Italy) Valentino Rossi	332
2	(Australia) Casey Stoner	245
3	(Spain) Dani Pedrosa	209
4	(Spain) Jorge Lorenzo	182
5	(Italy) Andrea Dovizioso	145

Constructors' Championship standings

Pos.	Constructor	Points
1	(Japan) Yamaha	361
2	(Italy) Ducati	286
3	(Japan) Honda	275
4	(Japan) Suzuki	165
5	(Japan) Kawasaki	81

- Note: Only the top five positions are included for both sets of standings.

== Notes ==
Previous race: 2008 Japanese Grand Prix	FIM Grand Prix World Championship; 2008 season	Next race: 2008 Malaysian Grand Prix
Previous race: 2007 Australian Grand Prix	Australian motorcycle Grand Prix	Next race: 2009 Australian Grand Prix
