= 2008 Malaysian motorcycle Grand Prix =

(Malaysia) 2008 Malaysian Grand Prix
Race details
- Race 17 of 18 races in the 2008 Grand Prix motorcycle racing season
- Date: 19 October 2008
- Official name: Polini Malaysian Motorcycle Grand Prix
- Location: Sepang International Circuit
- Course: Permanent racing facility; 5.543 km (3.444 mi)

MotoGP
Pole position
- Rider: (Spain) Dani Pedrosa
- Time: 2:01.548
Fastest lap
- Rider: (Italy) Valentino Rossi
- Time: 2:02.249
Podium
- First: (Italy) Valentino Rossi
- Second: (Spain) Dani Pedrosa
- Third: (Italy) Andrea Dovizioso

250cc
Pole position
- Rider: (Japan) Hiroshi Aoyama
- Time: 2:06.893
Fastest lap
- Rider: (Spain) Álvaro Bautista
- Time: 2:08.012
Podium
- First: (Spain) Álvaro Bautista
- Second: (Japan) Hiroshi Aoyama
- Third: (Italy) Marco Simoncelli

125cc
Pole position
- Rider: (Italy) Andrea Iannone
- Time: 2:14.676
Fastest lap
- Rider: (Germany) Sandro Cortese
- Time: 2:14.710
Podium
- First: (Hungary) Gábor Talmácsi
- Second: (United Kingdom) Bradley Smith
- Third: (Italy) Simone Corsi

The 2008 Malaysian motorcycle Grand Prix was the penultimate round of the 2008 MotoGP Championship. It took place on the weekend of 17–19 October 2008 at the Sepang International Circuit.

== MotoGP classification ==
Pos.	No.	Rider	Team	Manufacturer	Laps	Time/Retired	Grid	Points
1	46	(Italy) Valentino Rossi	Fiat Yamaha Team	Yamaha	21	43:06.007	2	25
2	2	(Spain) Dani Pedrosa	Repsol Honda Team	Honda	21	+4.008	1	20
3	4	(Italy) Andrea Dovizioso	JiR Team Scot MotoGP	Honda	21	+8.536	6	16
4	69	(United States) Nicky Hayden	Repsol Honda Team	Honda	21	+8.858	4	13
5	56	(Japan) Shinya Nakano	San Carlo Honda Gresini	Honda	21	+10.583	15	11
6	1	(Australia) Casey Stoner	Ducati Marlboro Team	Ducati	21	+13.640	7	10
7	65	(Italy) Loris Capirossi	Rizla Suzuki MotoGP	Suzuki	21	+15.936	8	9
8	5	(United States) Colin Edwards	Tech 3 Yamaha	Yamaha	21	+18.802	5	8
9	7	(Australia) Chris Vermeulen	Rizla Suzuki MotoGP	Suzuki	21	+23.174	11	7
10	14	(France) Randy de Puniet	LCR Honda MotoGP	Honda	21	+25.516	9	6
11	21	(United States) John Hopkins	Kawasaki Racing Team	Kawasaki	21	+27.609	10	5
12	13	(Australia) Anthony West	Kawasaki Racing Team	Kawasaki	21	+41.399	13	4
13	50	(France) Sylvain Guintoli	Alice Team	Ducati	21	+45.617	16	3
14	15	(San Marino) Alex de Angelis	San Carlo Honda Gresini	Honda	21	+49.003	17	2
15	24	(Spain) Toni Elías	Alice Team	Ducati	21	+59.139	19	1
16	33	(Italy) Marco Melandri	Ducati Marlboro Team	Ducati	21	+1:03.328	14	
17	9	(Japan) Nobuatsu Aoki	Rizla Suzuki MotoGP	Suzuki	21	+1:48.363	18	
Ret	48	(Spain) Jorge Lorenzo	Fiat Yamaha Team	Yamaha	12	Retirement	3	
Ret	52	(United Kingdom) James Toseland	Tech 3 Yamaha	Yamaha	2	Accident	12	

== 250 cc classification ==
Pos.	No.	Rider	Manufacturer	Laps	Time/Retired	Grid	Points
1	19	(Spain) Álvaro Bautista	Aprilia	20	42:56.428	2	25
2	4	(Japan) Hiroshi Aoyama	KTM	20	+2.586	1	20
3	58	(Italy) Marco Simoncelli	Gilera	20	+8.343	3	16
4	72	(Japan) Yuki Takahashi	Honda	20	+11.032	8	13
5	41	(Spain) Aleix Espargaró	Aprilia	20	+13.846	6	11
6	6	(Spain) Alex Debón	Aprilia	20	+14.274	9	10
7	15	(Italy) Roberto Locatelli	Gilera	20	+15.101	15	9
8	14	(Thailand) Ratthapark Wilairot	Honda	20	+16.987	5	8
9	12	(Switzerland) Thomas Lüthi	Aprilia	20	+25.356	14	7
10	52	(Czech Republic) Lukáš Pešek	Aprilia	20	+26.846	13	6
11	32	(Italy) Fabrizio Lai	Gilera	20	+49.907	12	5
12	17	(Czech Republic) Karel Abraham	Aprilia	20	+50.088	18	4
13	25	(Italy) Alex Baldolini	Aprilia	20	+1:05.816	17	3
14	35	(Italy) Simone Grotzkyj	Gilera	20	+1:15.544	19	2
15	10	(Hungary) Imre Tóth	Aprilia	20	+1:19.905	16	1
16	43	(Spain) Manuel Hernández	Aprilia	20	+1:35.890	21	
17	92	(Spain) Daniel Arcas	Aprilia	20	+2:00.717	22	
18	45	(Indonesia) Doni Tata Pradita	Yamaha	20	+2:28.842	20	
Ret	75	(Italy) Mattia Pasini	Aprilia	15	Retirement	11	
Ret	60	(Spain) Julián Simón	KTM	11	Retirement	7	
Ret	36	(Finland) Mika Kallio	KTM	5	Retirement	4	
Ret	55	(Spain) Héctor Faubel	Aprilia	4	Accident	10	
OFFICIAL 250cc REPORT

== 125 cc classification ==
Pos.	No.	Rider	Manufacturer	Laps	Time/Retired	Grid	Points
1	1	(Hungary) Gábor Talmácsi	Aprilia	19	43:00.716	2	25
2	38	(United Kingdom) Bradley Smith	Aprilia	19	+3.416	13	20
3	24	(Italy) Simone Corsi	Aprilia	19	+6.896	8	16
4	11	(Germany) Sandro Cortese	Aprilia	19	+6.925	18	13
5	63	(France) Mike Di Meglio	Derbi	19	+7.115	9	11
6	44	(Spain) Pol Espargaró	Derbi	19	+15.122	4	10
7	6	(Spain) Joan Olivé	Derbi	19	+21.805	6	9
8	77	(Switzerland) Dominique Aegerter	Derbi	19	+21.869	22	8
9	18	(Spain) Nicolás Terol	Aprilia	19	+21.958	12	7
10	29	(Italy) Andrea Iannone	Aprilia	19	+23.615	1	6
11	71	(Japan) Tomoyoshi Koyama	KTM	19	+23.651	7	5
12	33	(Spain) Sergio Gadea	Aprilia	19	+35.224	5	4
13	8	(Italy) Lorenzo Zanetti	KTM	19	+40.502	20	3
14	22	(Spain) Pablo Nieto	KTM	19	+51.404	17	2
15	26	(Spain) Adrián Martín	Aprilia	19	+55.726	26	1
16	16	(France) Jules Cluzel	Loncin	19	+56.537	23	
17	94	(Germany) Jonas Folger	KTM	19	+1:07.140	28	
18	72	(Italy) Marco Ravaioli	Aprilia	19	+1:07.573	24	
19	34	(Switzerland) Randy Krummenacher	KTM	19	+1:07.741	31	
20	21	(Germany) Robin Lässer	Aprilia	19	+1:08.849	27	
21	48	(Switzerland) Bastien Chesaux	Aprilia	19	+1:46.609	33	
22	95	(Romania) Robert Mureșan	Aprilia	18	+1 lap	30	
Ret	12	(Spain) Esteve Rabat	KTM	17	Retirement	25	
Ret	51	(United States) Stevie Bonsey	Aprilia	12	Retirement	15	
Ret	17	(Germany) Stefan Bradl	Aprilia	11	Retirement	10	
Ret	45	(United Kingdom) Scott Redding	Aprilia	11	Retirement	11	
Ret	56	(Netherlands) Hugo van den Berg	Aprilia	11	Retirement	29	
Ret	35	(Italy) Raffaele De Rosa	KTM	8	Retirement	19	
Ret	99	(United Kingdom) Danny Webb	Aprilia	8	Retirement	3	
Ret	28	(Spain) Enrique Jerez	KTM	8	Retirement	32	
Ret	5	(France) Alexis Masbou	Loncin	6	Retirement	14	
Ret	73	(Japan) Takaaki Nakagami	Aprilia	3	Accident	21	
DNS	7	(Spain) Efrén Vázquez	Aprilia	0	Did not start	16	
DNS	36	(France) Cyril Carrillo	Honda		Did not start		
DNS	93	(Spain) Marc Márquez	KTM		Did not start		
OFFICIAL 125cc REPORT

== Championship standings after the race (MotoGP) ==
Below are the standings for the top five riders and constructors after round seventeen has concluded.

Riders' Championship standings

Pos.	Rider	Points
1	(Italy) Valentino Rossi	357
2	(Australia) Casey Stoner	255
3	(Spain) Dani Pedrosa	229
4	(Spain) Jorge Lorenzo	182
5	(Italy) Andrea Dovizioso	161

Constructors' Championship standings

Pos.	Constructor	Points
1	(Japan) Yamaha	386
2	(Italy) Ducati	296
3	(Japan) Honda	295
4	(Japan) Suzuki	174
5	(Japan) Kawasaki	86

- Note: Only the top five positions are included for both sets of standings.

Previous race: 2008 Australian Grand Prix	FIM Grand Prix World Championship; 2008 season	Next race: 2008 Valencian Grand Prix
Previous race: 2007 Malaysian Grand Prix	Malaysian motorcycle Grand Prix	Next race: 2009 Malaysian Grand Prix
