= 2008 Japanese motorcycle Grand Prix =

(Japan) 2008 Japanese Grand Prix
Race details
- Race 15 of 18 races in the 2008 Grand Prix motorcycle racing season
- Date: 28 September 2008
- Official name: A-Style Grand Prix of Japan
- Location: Twin Ring Motegi
- Course: Permanent racing facility; 4.801 km (2.983 mi)

MotoGP
Pole position
- Rider: (Spain) Jorge Lorenzo
- Time: 1:45.543
Fastest lap
- Rider: (Australia) Casey Stoner
- Time: 1:47.091
Podium
- First: (Italy) Valentino Rossi
- Second: (Australia) Casey Stoner
- Third: (Spain) Dani Pedrosa

250cc
Pole position
- Rider: (Italy) Marco Simoncelli
- Time: 1:51.473
Fastest lap
- Rider: (Spain) Álvaro Bautista
- Time: 1:51.412
Podium
- First: (Italy) Marco Simoncelli
- Second: (Spain) Álvaro Bautista
- Third: (Spain) Alex Debón

125cc
Pole position
- Rider: (France) Mike Di Meglio
- Time: 1:58.678
Fastest lap
- Rider: (Hungary) Gábor Talmácsi
- Time: 1:58.815
Podium
- First: (Germany) Stefan Bradl
- Second: (France) Mike Di Meglio
- Third: (Hungary) Gábor Talmácsi

The 2008 Japanese motorcycle Grand Prix was the fifteenth round of the 2008 MotoGP Championship. It took place on the weekend of 26–28 September 2008 at the Twin Ring Motegi, located in Motegi, Japan.

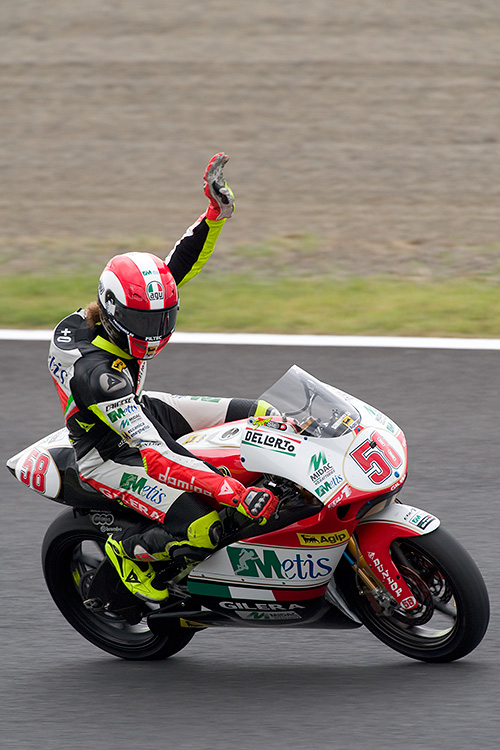
Marco Simoncelli, waving at the crowd after winning the 250cc race.

== MotoGP classification ==
Pos.	No.	Rider	Team	Manufacturer	Laps	Time/Retired	Grid	Points
1	46	(Italy) Valentino Rossi	Fiat Yamaha Team	Yamaha	24	43:09.599	4	25
2	1	(Australia) Casey Stoner	Ducati Marlboro Team	Ducati	24	+1.943	2	20
3	2	(Spain) Dani Pedrosa	Repsol Honda Team	Honda	24	+4.866	5	16
4	48	(Spain) Jorge Lorenzo	Fiat Yamaha Team	Yamaha	24	+6.165	1	13
5	69	(United States) Nicky Hayden	Repsol Honda Team	Honda	24	+24.593	3	11
6	65	(Italy) Loris Capirossi	Rizla Suzuki MotoGP	Suzuki	24	+25.685	6	10
7	5	(United States) Colin Edwards	Tech 3 Yamaha	Yamaha	24	+25.918	7	9
8	56	(Japan) Shinya Nakano	San Carlo Honda Gresini	Honda	24	+26.003	9	8
9	4	(Italy) Andrea Dovizioso	JiR Team Scot MotoGP	Honda	24	+26.219	13	7
10	21	(United States) John Hopkins	Kawasaki Racing Team	Kawasaki	24	+37.131	11	6
11	52	(United Kingdom) James Toseland	Tech 3 Yamaha	Yamaha	24	+37.574	10	5
12	14	(France) Randy de Puniet	LCR Honda MotoGP	Honda	24	+38.020	8	4
13	33	(Italy) Marco Melandri	Ducati Marlboro Team	Ducati	24	+39.768	16	3
14	50	(France) Sylvain Guintoli	Alice Team	Ducati	24	+45.846	15	2
15	13	(Australia) Anthony West	Kawasaki Racing Team	Kawasaki	24	+55.748	17	1
16	24	(Spain) Toni Elías	Alice Team	Ducati	24	+59.320	14	
17	15	(San Marino) Alex de Angelis	San Carlo Honda Gresini	Honda	24	+1:12.398	18	
Ret	7	(Australia) Chris Vermeulen	Rizla Suzuki MotoGP	Suzuki	16	Retirement	12	
Ret	64	(Japan) Kousuke Akiyoshi	Rizla Suzuki MotoGP	Suzuki	0	Accident	19	

== 250 cc classification ==
Pos.	No.	Rider	Manufacturer	Laps	Time/Retired	Grid	Points
1	58	(Italy) Marco Simoncelli	Gilera	23	43:09.385	1	25
2	19	(Spain) Álvaro Bautista	Aprilia	23	+0.348	5	20
3	6	(Spain) Alex Debón	Aprilia	23	+8.414	3	16
4	60	(Spain) Julián Simón	KTM	23	+9.151	7	13
5	36	(Finland) Mika Kallio	KTM	23	+17.041	4	11
6	72	(Japan) Yuki Takahashi	Honda	23	+19.632	8	10
7	41	(Spain) Aleix Espargaró	Aprilia	23	+19.892	9	9
8	75	(Italy) Mattia Pasini	Aprilia	23	+20.442	11	8
9	4	(Japan) Hiroshi Aoyama	KTM	23	+22.303	2	7
10	15	(Italy) Roberto Locatelli	Gilera	23	+22.387	10	6
11	55	(Spain) Héctor Faubel	Aprilia	23	+32.851	6	5
12	52	(Czech Republic) Lukáš Pešek	Aprilia	23	+48.621	12	4
13	14	(Thailand) Ratthapark Wilairot	Honda	23	+48.803	14	3
14	66	(Japan) Shoya Tomizawa	Honda	23	+49.572	13	2
15	32	(Italy) Fabrizio Lai	Gilera	23	+58.045	15	1
16	25	(Italy) Alex Baldolini	Aprilia	23	+58.362	17	
17	65	(Japan) Takumi Takahashi	Honda	23	+1:15.062	16	
18	45	(Indonesia) Doni Tata Pradita	Yamaha	23	+1:49.930	19	
19	43	(Spain) Manuel Hernández	Aprilia	23	+1:58.603	20	
20	92	(Spain) Daniel Arcas	Aprilia	22	+1 lap	21	
21	69	(Japan) Takumi Endoh	Yamaha	22	+1 lap	24	
22	10	(Hungary) Imre Tóth	Aprilia	22	+1 lap	23	
23	68	(Japan) Yuuki Ito	Yamaha	20	+3 laps	22	
Ret	35	(Italy) Simone Grotzkyj	Gilera	0	Accident	18	
DNS	21	(Spain) Héctor Barberá	Aprilia		Did not start		
DNS	67	(Japan) Kazuki Watanabe	Yamaha		Did not start		
DNS	17	(Czech Republic) Karel Abraham	Aprilia		Did not start		
OFFICIAL 250cc REPORT

== 125 cc classification ==
Pos.	No.	Rider	Manufacturer	Laps	Time/Retired	Grid	Points
1	17	(Germany) Stefan Bradl	Aprilia	20	39:57.228	2	25
2	63	(France) Mike Di Meglio	Derbi	20	+0.151	1	20
3	1	(Hungary) Gábor Talmácsi	Aprilia	20	+0.281	5	16
4	6	(Spain) Joan Olivé	Derbi	20	+5.945	12	13
5	18	(Spain) Nicolás Terol	Aprilia	20	+6.072	3	11
6	11	(Germany) Sandro Cortese	Aprilia	20	+6.135	4	10
7	24	(Italy) Simone Corsi	Aprilia	20	+6.455	15	9
8	45	(United Kingdom) Scott Redding	Aprilia	20	+25.393	6	8
9	33	(Spain) Sergio Gadea	Aprilia	20	+25.537	10	7
10	99	(United Kingdom) Danny Webb	Aprilia	20	+26.192	18	6
11	71	(Japan) Tomoyoshi Koyama	KTM	20	+27.307	11	5
12	35	(Italy) Raffaele De Rosa	KTM	20	+39.536	19	4
13	73	(Japan) Takaaki Nakagami	Aprilia	20	+43.745	20	3
14	7	(Spain) Efrén Vázquez	Aprilia	20	+51.629	16	2
15	5	(France) Alexis Masbou	Loncin	20	+51.899	22	1
16	94	(Germany) Jonas Folger	KTM	20	+51.931	31	
17	8	(Italy) Lorenzo Zanetti	KTM	20	+51.962	23	
18	22	(Spain) Pablo Nieto	KTM	20	+52.589	28	
19	77	(Switzerland) Dominique Aegerter	Derbi	20	+56.837	7	
20	51	(United States) Stevie Bonsey	Aprilia	20	+56.977	17	
21	72	(Italy) Marco Ravaioli	Aprilia	20	+58.626	30	
22	58	(Japan) Yuuichi Yanagisawa	Honda	20	+59.926	32	
23	21	(Germany) Robin Lässer	Aprilia	20	+1:09.782	25	
24	59	(Japan) Hiroki Ono	Honda	20	+1:14.883	35	
25	26	(Spain) Adrián Martín	Aprilia	20	+1:26.120	29	
26	36	(France) Cyril Carrillo	Honda	20	+1:29.130	37	
Ret	38	(United Kingdom) Bradley Smith	Aprilia	16	Retirement	14	
Ret	62	(Japan) Kazuma Watanabe	Honda	16	Retirement	34	
Ret	60	(Austria) Michael Ranseder	Aprilia	14	Retirement	24	
Ret	57	(Japan) Iori Namihira	Honda	11	Retirement	26	
Ret	50	(Japan) Hiroomi Iwata	Honda	10	Retirement	27	
Ret	48	(Switzerland) Bastien Chesaux	Aprilia	8	Accident	39	
Ret	95	(Romania) Robert Mureșan	Aprilia	6	Accident	33	
Ret	12	(Spain) Esteve Rabat	KTM	0	Accident	21	
Ret	16	(France) Jules Cluzel	Loncin	0	Accident	36	
Ret	29	(Italy) Andrea Iannone	Aprilia	0	Accident	9	
Ret	44	(Spain) Pol Espargaró	Derbi	0	Accident	8	
Ret	56	(Netherlands) Hugo van den Berg	Aprilia	0	Accident	38	
Ret	93	(Spain) Marc Márquez	KTM	0	Accident	13	
OFFICIAL 125cc REPORT

== Championship standings after the race (MotoGP) ==
Below are the standings for the top five riders and constructors after round fifteen has concluded.

Riders' Championship standings

Pos.	Rider	Points
1	(Italy) Valentino Rossi	312
2	(Australia) Casey Stoner	220
3	(Spain) Dani Pedrosa	209
4	(Spain) Jorge Lorenzo	169
5	(Italy) Andrea Dovizioso	136

Constructors' Championship standings

Pos.	Constructor	Points
1	(Japan) Yamaha	341
2	(Italy) Ducati	261
3	(Japan) Honda	259
4	(Japan) Suzuki	159
5	(Japan) Kawasaki	77

- Note: Only the top five positions are included for both sets of standings.

Previous race: 2008 Indianapolis Grand Prix	FIM Grand Prix World Championship; 2008 season	Next race: 2008 Australian Grand Prix
Previous race: 2007 Japanese Grand Prix	Japanese motorcycle Grand Prix	Next race: 2009 Japanese Grand Prix
