= 2008 Portuguese motorcycle Grand Prix =

(Portugal) 2008 Portuguese Grand Prix
Race details
- Race 3 of 18 races in the 2008 Grand Prix motorcycle racing season
- Date: 13 April 2008
- Official name: bwin.com Grande Prémio de Portugal
- Location: Autódromo do Estoril
- Course: Permanent racing facility; 4.182 km (2.599 mi)

MotoGP
Pole position
- Rider: (Spain) Jorge Lorenzo
- Time: 1:35.715
Fastest lap
- Rider: (Spain) Jorge Lorenzo
- Time: 1:37.404
Podium
- First: (Spain) Jorge Lorenzo
- Second: (Spain) Dani Pedrosa
- Third: (Italy) Valentino Rossi

250cc
Pole position
- Rider: (Italy) Marco Simoncelli
- Time: 1:40.257
Fastest lap
- Rider: (Spain) Álvaro Bautista
- Time: 1:41.425
Podium
- First: (Spain) Álvaro Bautista
- Second: (Italy) Marco Simoncelli
- Third: (Finland) Mika Kallio

125cc
Pole position
- Rider: (Italy) Simone Corsi
- Time: 1:45.367
Fastest lap
- Rider: (Italy) Simone Corsi
- Time: 1:45.557
Podium
- First: (Italy) Simone Corsi
- Second: (Spain) Joan Olivé
- Third: (Spain) Nicolás Terol

The 2008 Portuguese motorcycle Grand Prix was the third round of the 2008 MotoGP Championship. It took place on the weekend of 11–13 April 2008 at the Autódromo do Estoril located in Estoril, Portugal.

This race would mark the first start in Grand Prix motorcycle racing for future multiple time MotoGP champion Marc Márquez. Márquez had entered the previous round at Jerez, but withdrew before the race began.

== MotoGP classification ==
Pos.	No.	Rider	Team	Manufacturer	Laps	Time/Retired	Grid	Points
1	48	(Spain) Jorge Lorenzo	Fiat Yamaha Team	Yamaha	28	45:53.089	1	25
2	2	(Spain) Dani Pedrosa	Repsol Honda Team	Honda	28	+1.817	2	20
3	46	(Italy) Valentino Rossi	Fiat Yamaha Team	Yamaha	28	+12.723	3	16
4	5	(United States) Colin Edwards	Tech 3 Yamaha	Yamaha	28	+17.223	5	13
5	21	(United States) John Hopkins	Kawasaki Racing Team	Kawasaki	28	+23.752	10	11
6	1	(Australia) Casey Stoner	Ducati Marlboro Team	Ducati	28	+26.688	9	10
7	52	(United Kingdom) James Toseland	Tech 3 Yamaha	Yamaha	28	+32.631	6	9
8	7	(Australia) Chris Vermeulen	Rizla Suzuki MotoGP	Suzuki	28	+36.382	13	8
9	65	(Italy) Loris Capirossi	Rizla Suzuki MotoGP	Suzuki	28	+38.268	12	7
10	56	(Japan) Shinya Nakano	San Carlo Honda Gresini	Honda	28	+39.476	11	6
11	15	(San Marino) Alex de Angelis	San Carlo Honda Gresini	Honda	28	+1:01.306	16	5
12	24	(Spain) Toni Elías	Alice Team	Ducati	28	+1:03.867	14	4
13	33	(Italy) Marco Melandri	Ducati Marlboro Team	Ducati	28	+1:09.525	17	3
14	50	(France) Sylvain Guintoli	Alice Team	Ducati	28	+1:09.634	18	2
15	14	(France) Randy de Puniet	LCR Honda MotoGP	Honda	28	+1:11.542	8	1
16	13	(Australia) Anthony West	Kawasaki Racing Team	Kawasaki	28	+1:23.629	15	
Ret	69	(United States) Nicky Hayden	Repsol Honda Team	Honda	16	Accident	4	
Ret	4	(Italy) Andrea Dovizioso	JiR Team Scot MotoGP	Honda	15	Accident	7	

== 250 cc classification ==
Pos.	No.	Rider	Manufacturer	Laps	Time/Retired	Grid	Points
1	19	(Spain) Álvaro Bautista	Aprilia	26	44:34.257	2	25
2	58	(Italy) Marco Simoncelli	Gilera	26	+7.050	1	20
3	36	(Finland) Mika Kallio	KTM	26	+7.063	4	16
4	12	(Switzerland) Thomas Lüthi	Aprilia	26	+12.998	8	13
5	4	(Japan) Hiroshi Aoyama	KTM	26	+14.666	6	11
6	72	(Japan) Yuki Takahashi	Honda	26	+18.498	5	10
7	60	(Spain) Julián Simón	KTM	26	+26.812	11	9
8	21	(Spain) Héctor Barberá	Aprilia	26	+28.012	9	8
9	55	(Spain) Héctor Faubel	Aprilia	26	+28.288	10	7
10	52	(Czech Republic) Lukáš Pešek	Aprilia	26	+36.966	12	6
11	41	(Spain) Aleix Espargaró	Aprilia	26	+38.296	13	5
12	25	(Italy) Alex Baldolini	Aprilia	26	+52.070	14	4
13	14	(Thailand) Ratthapark Wilairot	Honda	26	+1:13.303	17	3
14	90	(Italy) Federico Sandi	Aprilia	26	+1:17.592	20	2
15	50	(Republic of Ireland) Eugene Laverty	Aprilia	26	+1:21.363	21	1
16	17	(Czech Republic) Karel Abraham	Aprilia	26	+1:26.355	16	
17	54	(San Marino) Manuel Poggiali	Gilera	26	+1:27.438	15	
18	10	(Hungary) Imre Tóth	Aprilia	25	+1 lap	22	
19	45	(Indonesia) Doni Tata Pradita	Yamaha	25	+1 lap	23	
Ret	15	(Italy) Roberto Locatelli	Gilera	23	Retirement	19	
Ret	75	(Italy) Mattia Pasini	Aprilia	20	Accident	3	
Ret	7	(Spain) Russell Gómez	Aprilia	11	Retirement	24	
Ret	32	(Italy) Fabrizio Lai	Gilera	4	Retirement	18	
Ret	6	(Spain) Alex Debón	Aprilia	3	Accident	7	
Ret	89	(China) Ho Wan Chow	Aprilia	1	Accident	25	
DNQ	91	(Portugal) Sérgio Batista	Honda		Did not qualify		
OFFICIAL 250cc REPORT

== 125 cc classification ==
Pos.	No.	Rider	Manufacturer	Laps	Time/Retired	Grid	Points
1	24	(Italy) Simone Corsi	Aprilia	23	40:56.168	1	25
2	6	(Spain) Joan Olivé	Derbi	23	+0.299	6	20
3	18	(Spain) Nicolás Terol	Aprilia	23	+6.355	3	16
4	51	(United States) Stevie Bonsey	Aprilia	23	+14.973	2	13
5	99	(United Kingdom) Danny Webb	Aprilia	23	+15.532	4	11
6	1	(Hungary) Gábor Talmácsi	Aprilia	23	+15.868	9	10
7	63	(France) Mike Di Meglio	Derbi	23	+15.875	8	9
8	17	(Germany) Stefan Bradl	Aprilia	23	+17.887	7	8
9	33	(Spain) Sergio Gadea	Aprilia	23	+18.123	5	7
10	11	(Germany) Sandro Cortese	Aprilia	23	+22.613	20	6
11	29	(Italy) Andrea Iannone	Aprilia	23	+27.490	12	5
12	77	(Switzerland) Dominique Aegerter	Derbi	23	+27.544	19	4
13	44	(Spain) Pol Espargaró	Derbi	23	+28.370	21	3
14	60	(Austria) Michael Ranseder	Aprilia	23	+28.417	22	2
15	7	(Spain) Efrén Vázquez	Aprilia	23	+32.713	15	1
16	71	(Japan) Tomoyoshi Koyama	KTM	23	+34.002	11	
17	27	(Italy) Stefano Bianco	Aprilia	23	+47.698	17	
18	93	(Spain) Marc Márquez	KTM	23	+51.637	26	
19	73	(Japan) Takaaki Nakagami	Aprilia	23	+51.679	24	
20	5	(France) Alexis Masbou	Loncin	23	+51.717	25	
21	45	(United Kingdom) Scott Redding	Aprilia	23	+1:07.908	10	
22	30	(Spain) Pere Tutusaus	Aprilia	23	+1:15.894	23	
23	13	(Italy) Dino Lombardi	Aprilia	23	+1:19.975	33	
24	95	(Romania) Robert Mureșan	Aprilia	23	+1:39.194	30	
25	36	(France) Cyril Carrillo	Honda	23	+1:39.218	34	
26	14	(Spain) Axel Pons	Aprilia	23	+1:43.956	32	
27	76	(Spain) Iván Maestro	Aprilia	22	+1 lap	31	
28	37	(Czech Republic) Karel Pešek	Aprilia	22	+1 lap	35	
Ret	38	(United Kingdom) Bradley Smith	Aprilia	12	Accident	13	
Ret	8	(Italy) Lorenzo Zanetti	KTM	12	Retirement	28	
Ret	22	(Spain) Pablo Nieto	KTM	11	Retirement	14	
Ret	16	(France) Jules Cluzel	Loncin	8	Retirement	27	
Ret	12	(Spain) Esteve Rabat	KTM	7	Retirement	18	
Ret	35	(Italy) Raffaele De Rosa	KTM	6	Accident	16	
Ret	56	(Netherlands) Hugo van den Berg	Aprilia	0	Accident	29	
DNS	19	(Italy) Roberto Lacalendola	Aprilia		Did not start		
WD	69	(France) Louis Rossi	Honda		Withdrew		
OFFICIAL 125cc REPORT

== Championship standings after the race (MotoGP) ==
Below are the standings for the top five riders and constructors after round three has concluded.

Riders' Championship standings

Pos.	Rider	Points
1	(Spain) Jorge Lorenzo	61
2	(Spain) Dani Pedrosa	61
3	(Italy) Valentino Rossi	47
4	(Australia) Casey Stoner	40
5	(United Kingdom) James Toseland	29

Constructors' Championship standings

Pos.	Constructor	Points
1	(Japan) Yamaha	65
2	(Japan) Honda	61
3	(Italy) Ducati	40
4	(Japan) Suzuki	27
5	(Japan) Kawasaki	24

- Note: Only the top five positions are included for both sets of standings.

Previous race: 2008 Spanish Grand Prix	FIM Grand Prix World Championship; 2008 season	Next race: 2008 Chinese Grand Prix
Previous race: 2007 Portuguese Grand Prix	Portuguese motorcycle Grand Prix	Next race: 2009 Portuguese Grand Prix
