= 2007 Chinese motorcycle Grand Prix =

(China) 2007 Chinese Grand Prix
Race details
- Race 4 of 18 races in the 2007 Grand Prix motorcycle racing season
- Date: 6 May 2007
- Official name: Sinopec Great Wall Lubricants Grand Prix of China
- Location: Shanghai International Circuit
- Course: Permanent racing facility; 5.281 km (3.281 mi)

MotoGP
Pole position
- Rider: (Italy) Valentino Rossi
- Time: 1:58.424
Fastest lap
- Rider: (Australia) Casey Stoner
- Time: 1:59.857
Podium
- First: (Australia) Casey Stoner
- Second: (Italy) Valentino Rossi
- Third: (United States) John Hopkins

250cc
Pole position
- Rider: (Spain) Jorge Lorenzo
- Time: 2:04.543
Fastest lap
- Rider: (Spain) Jorge Lorenzo
- Time: 2:05.738
Podium
- First: (Spain) Jorge Lorenzo
- Second: (Spain) Álvaro Bautista
- Third: (Italy) Andrea Dovizioso

125cc
Pole position
- Rider: (Italy) Mattia Pasini
- Time: 2:11.946
Fastest lap
- Rider: (Czech Republic) Lukáš Pešek
- Time: 2:12.420
Podium
- First: (Czech Republic) Lukáš Pešek
- Second: (Spain) Héctor Faubel
- Third: (Spain) Esteve Rabat

The 2007 Chinese motorcycle Grand Prix was the fourth round of the 2007 MotoGP championship. It took place on the weekend of 4–6 May 2007 at the Shanghai International Circuit.

== MotoGP classification ==
| Pos. | No. | Rider | Team | Manufacturer | Laps | Time/Retired | Grid | Points |
|---|---|---|---|---|---|---|---|---|
| 1 | 27 | (Australia) Casey Stoner | Ducati Marlboro Team | Ducati | 22 | 44:12.891 | 4 | 25 |
| 2 | 46 | (Italy) Valentino Rossi | Fiat Yamaha Team | Yamaha | 22 | +3.036 | 1 | 20 |
| 3 | 21 | (United States) John Hopkins | Rizla Suzuki MotoGP | Suzuki | 22 | +6.663 | 2 | 16 |
| 4 | 26 | (Spain) Dani Pedrosa | Repsol Honda Team | Honda | 22 | +14.090 | 5 | 13 |
| 5 | 33 | (Italy) Marco Melandri | Honda Gresini | Honda | 22 | +17.276 | 6 | 11 |
| 6 | 65 | (Italy) Loris Capirossi | Ducati Marlboro Team | Ducati | 22 | +26.256 | 14 | 10 |
| 7 | 71 | (Australia) Chris Vermeulen | Rizla Suzuki MotoGP | Suzuki | 22 | +26.591 | 15 | 9 |
| 8 | 14 | (France) Randy de Puniet | Kawasaki Racing Team | Kawasaki | 22 | +27.025 | 7 | 8 |
| 9 | 66 | (Germany) Alex Hofmann | Pramac d'Antin | Ducati | 22 | +28.108 | 11 | 7 |
| 10 | 7 | (Spain) Carlos Checa | Honda LCR | Honda | 22 | +32.957 | 13 | 6 |
| 11 | 5 | (United States) Colin Edwards | Fiat Yamaha Team | Yamaha | 22 | +35.053 | 3 | 5 |
| 12 | 1 | (United States) Nicky Hayden | Repsol Honda Team | Honda | 22 | +37.327 | 9 | 4 |
| 13 | 50 | (France) Sylvain Guintoli | Dunlop Yamaha Tech 3 | Yamaha | 22 | +50.705 | 17 | 3 |
| 14 | 4 | (Brazil) Alex Barros | Pramac d'Antin | Ducati | 22 | +55.264 | 8 | 2 |
| 15 | 10 | (United States) Kenny Roberts Jr. | Team Roberts | KR212V | 22 | +57.736 | 16 | 1 |
| Ret | 56 | (Japan) Shinya Nakano | Konica Minolta Honda | Honda | 3 | Accident | 10 | |
| Ret | 6 | (Japan) Makoto Tamada | Dunlop Yamaha Tech 3 | Yamaha | 3 | Accident | 18 | |
| Ret | 24 | (Spain) Toni Elías | Honda Gresini | Honda | 0 | Accident | 12 | |
| WD | 19 | (France) Olivier Jacque | Kawasaki Racing Team | Kawasaki | | Withdrew | | |

== 250 cc classification ==
| Pos. | No. | Rider | Manufacturer | Laps | Time/Retired | Grid | Points |
|---|---|---|---|---|---|---|---|
| 1 | 1 | (Spain) Jorge Lorenzo | Aprilia | 21 | 44:17.095 | 1 | 25 |
| 2 | 19 | (Spain) Álvaro Bautista | Aprilia | 21 | +3.904 | 6 | 20 |
| 3 | 34 | (Italy) Andrea Dovizioso | Honda | 21 | +5.031 | 5 | 16 |
| 4 | 3 | (San Marino) Alex de Angelis | Aprilia | 21 | +6.560 | 8 | 13 |
| 5 | 36 | (Finland) Mika Kallio | KTM | 21 | +10.248 | 3 | 11 |
| 6 | 80 | (Spain) Héctor Barberá | Aprilia | 21 | +10.502 | 2 | 10 |
| 7 | 60 | (Spain) Julián Simón | Honda | 21 | +10.832 | 4 | 9 |
| 8 | 12 | (Switzerland) Thomas Lüthi | Aprilia | 21 | +30.484 | 7 | 8 |
| 9 | 4 | (Japan) Hiroshi Aoyama | KTM | 21 | +32.895 | 11 | 7 |
| 10 | 32 | (Italy) Fabrizio Lai | Aprilia | 21 | +50.977 | 12 | 6 |
| 11 | 41 | (Spain) Aleix Espargaró | Aprilia | 21 | +51.699 | 15 | 5 |
| 12 | 8 | (Thailand) Ratthapark Wilairot | Honda | 21 | +53.036 | 16 | 4 |
| 13 | 14 | (Australia) Anthony West | Aprilia | 21 | +1:01.663 | 13 | 3 |
| 14 | 44 | (Japan) Taro Sekiguchi | Aprilia | 21 | +1:14.603 | 22 | 2 |
| 15 | 9 | (Spain) Arturo Tizón | Aprilia | 21 | +1:14.754 | 23 | 1 |
| 16 | 16 | (France) Jules Cluzel | Aprilia | 21 | +1:39.890 | 19 | |
| 17 | 50 | (Republic of Ireland) Eugene Laverty | Honda | 21 | +1:47.005 | 21 | |
| 18 | 10 | (Hungary) Imre Tóth | Aprilia | 21 | +1:50.516 | 18 | |
| 19 | 63 | (China) Jin Xiao | Yamaha | 20 | +1 lap | 24 | |
| Ret | 58 | (Italy) Marco Simoncelli | Gilera | 13 | Accident | 10 | |
| Ret | 25 | (Italy) Alex Baldolini | Aprilia | 12 | Accident | 17 | |
| Ret | 17 | (Czech Republic) Karel Abraham | Aprilia | 10 | Retirement | 20 | |
| Ret | 73 | (Japan) Shuhei Aoyama | Honda | 8 | Accident | 9 | |
| Ret | 28 | (Germany) Dirk Heidolf | Aprilia | 2 | Retirement | 14 | |
| DNS | 55 | (Japan) Yuki Takahashi | Honda | | Did not start | | |
| DNS | 62 | (China) Shi Zhao Huang | Yamaha | | Did not start | | |
OFFICIAL 250cc REPORT

== 125 cc classification ==
| Pos. | No. | Rider | Manufacturer | Laps | Time/Retired | Grid | Points |
|---|---|---|---|---|---|---|---|
| 1 | 52 | (Czech Republic) Lukáš Pešek | Derbi | 19 | 42:25.923 | 3 | 25 |
| 2 | 55 | (Spain) Héctor Faubel | Aprilia | 19 | +0.187 | 2 | 20 |
| 3 | 12 | (Spain) Esteve Rabat | Honda | 19 | +0.481 | 12 | 16 |
| 4 | 14 | (Hungary) Gábor Talmácsi | Aprilia | 19 | +0.782 | 4 | 13 |
| 5 | 24 | (Italy) Simone Corsi | Aprilia | 19 | +1.140 | 7 | 11 |
| 6 | 33 | (Spain) Sergio Gadea | Aprilia | 19 | +1.191 | 6 | 10 |
| 7 | 60 | (Austria) Michael Ranseder | Derbi | 19 | +2.375 | 9 | 9 |
| 8 | 38 | (United Kingdom) Bradley Smith | Honda | 19 | +2.400 | 5 | 8 |
| 9 | 44 | (Spain) Pol Espargaró | Aprilia | 19 | +2.717 | 18 | 7 |
| 10 | 75 | (Italy) Mattia Pasini | Aprilia | 19 | +3.423 | 1 | 6 |
| 11 | 29 | (Italy) Andrea Iannone | Aprilia | 19 | +8.360 | 15 | 5 |
| 12 | 35 | (Italy) Raffaele De Rosa | Aprilia | 19 | +8.640 | 11 | 4 |
| 13 | 7 | (France) Alexis Masbou | Honda | 19 | +12.680 | 22 | 3 |
| 14 | 63 | (France) Mike Di Meglio | Honda | 19 | +16.671 | 23 | 2 |
| 15 | 8 | (Italy) Lorenzo Zanetti | Aprilia | 19 | +16.777 | 21 | 1 |
| 16 | 22 | (Spain) Pablo Nieto | Aprilia | 19 | +24.444 | 13 | |
| 17 | 53 | (Italy) Simone Grotzkyj | Aprilia | 19 | +27.337 | 25 | |
| 18 | 11 | (Germany) Sandro Cortese | Aprilia | 19 | +32.924 | 10 | |
| 19 | 6 | (Spain) Joan Olivé | Aprilia | 19 | +35.029 | 14 | |
| 20 | 20 | (Italy) Roberto Tamburini | Aprilia | 19 | +36.883 | 17 | |
| 21 | 77 | (Switzerland) Dominique Aegerter | Aprilia | 19 | +46.084 | 28 | |
| 22 | 37 | (Netherlands) Joey Litjens | Honda | 19 | +46.456 | 29 | |
| 23 | 99 | (United Kingdom) Danny Webb | Honda | 19 | +48.131 | 30 | |
| 24 | 13 | (Italy) Dino Lombardi | Honda | 19 | +1:08.983 | 31 | |
| 25 | 56 | (Netherlands) Hugo van den Berg | Aprilia | 19 | +1:09.714 | 32 | |
| 26 | 95 | (Romania) Robert Mureșan | Derbi | 19 | +1:50.417 | 26 | |
| 27 | 34 | (Switzerland) Randy Krummenacher | KTM | 18 | +1 lap | 24 | |
| Ret | 71 | (Japan) Tomoyoshi Koyama | KTM | 18 | Retirement | 8 | |
| Ret | 15 | (Italy) Federico Sandi | Aprilia | 9 | Retirement | 19 | |
| Ret | 27 | (Italy) Stefano Bianco | Aprilia | 8 | Retirement | 20 | |
| Ret | 18 | (Spain) Nicolás Terol | Derbi | 1 | Accident | 16 | |
| Ret | 51 | (United States) Stevie Bonsey | KTM | 1 | Accident | 27 | |
OFFICIAL 125cc REPORT

== Championship standings after the race (MotoGP) ==
Below are the standings for the top five riders and constructors after round four has concluded.

Riders' Championship standings

| Pos. | Rider | Points |
|---|---|---|
| 1 | (Australia) Casey Stoner | 86 |
| 2 | (Italy) Valentino Rossi | 71 |
| 3 | (Spain) Dani Pedrosa | 49 |
| 4 | (Italy) Marco Melandri | 41 |
| 5 | (United States) John Hopkins | 39 |

Constructors' Championship standings

| Pos. | Constructor | Points |
|---|---|---|
| 1 | (Italy) Ducati | 86 |
| 2 | (Japan) Yamaha | 71 |
| 3 | (Japan) Honda | 69 |
| 4 | (Japan) Suzuki | 46 |
| 5 | (Japan) Kawasaki | 23 |

- Note: Only the top five positions are included for both sets of standings.

| Previous race: 2007 Turkish Grand Prix | FIM Grand Prix World Championship; 2007 season | Next race: 2007 French Grand Prix |
| Previous race: 2006 Chinese Grand Prix | Chinese motorcycle Grand Prix | Next race: 2008 Chinese Grand Prix |
