= 2008 Chinese motorcycle Grand Prix =

(China) 2008 Chinese Grand Prix
Race details
- Race 4 of 18 races in the 2008 Grand Prix motorcycle racing season
- Date: 4 May 2008
- Official name: Pramac Grand Prix of China
- Location: Shanghai International Circuit
- Course: Permanent racing facility; 5.281 km (3.281 mi)

MotoGP
Pole position
- Rider: (United States) Colin Edwards
- Time: 1:58.139
Fastest lap
- Rider: (Italy) Valentino Rossi
- Time: 1:59.273
Podium
- First: (Italy) Valentino Rossi
- Second: (Spain) Dani Pedrosa
- Third: (Australia) Casey Stoner

250cc
Pole position
- Rider: (Spain) Álvaro Bautista
- Time: 2:04.882
Fastest lap
- Rider: (Finland) Mika Kallio
- Time: 2:15.834
Podium
- First: (Finland) Mika Kallio
- Second: (Japan) Hiroshi Aoyama
- Third: (Italy) Mattia Pasini

125cc
Pole position
- Rider: (United Kingdom) Bradley Smith
- Time: 2:12.364
Fastest lap
- Rider: (Austria) Michael Ranseder
- Time: 2:23.432
Podium
- First: (Italy) Andrea Iannone
- Second: (France) Mike Di Meglio
- Third: (Hungary) Gábor Talmácsi

The 2008 Chinese motorcycle Grand Prix was the fourth round of the 2008 MotoGP Championship. It took place on the weekend of 2–4 May 2008 at the Shanghai International Circuit.

== MotoGP classification ==
Pos.	No.	Rider	Team	Manufacturer	Laps	Time/Retired	Grid	Points
1	46	(Italy) Valentino Rossi	Fiat Yamaha Team	Yamaha	22	44:08.061	2	25
2	2	(Spain) Dani Pedrosa	Repsol Honda Team	Honda	22	+3.890	5	20
3	1	(Australia) Casey Stoner	Ducati Marlboro Team	Ducati	22	+15.928	3	16
4	48	(Spain) Jorge Lorenzo	Fiat Yamaha Team	Yamaha	22	+22.494	4	13
5	33	(Italy) Marco Melandri	Ducati Marlboro Team	Ducati	22	+26.957	12	11
6	69	(United States) Nicky Hayden	Repsol Honda Team	Honda	22	+28.369	10	10
7	5	(United States) Colin Edwards	Tech 3 Yamaha	Yamaha	22	+29.780	1	9
8	24	(Spain) Toni Elías	Alice Team	Ducati	22	+30.225	15	8
9	65	(Italy) Loris Capirossi	Rizla Suzuki MotoGP	Suzuki	22	+31.440	6	7
10	56	(Japan) Shinya Nakano	San Carlo Honda Gresini	Honda	22	+35.969	13	6
11	4	(Italy) Andrea Dovizioso	JiR Team Scot MotoGP	Honda	22	+36.246	11	5
12	52	(United Kingdom) James Toseland	Tech 3 Yamaha	Yamaha	22	+43.191	7	4
13	14	(France) Randy de Puniet	LCR Honda MotoGP	Honda	22	+43.442	9	3
14	21	(United States) John Hopkins	Kawasaki Racing Team	Kawasaki	22	+45.855	14	2
15	50	(France) Sylvain Guintoli	Alice Team	Ducati	22	+46.330	17	1
16	15	(San Marino) Alex de Angelis	San Carlo Honda Gresini	Honda	22	+50.593	16	
17	13	(Australia) Anthony West	Kawasaki Racing Team	Kawasaki	22	+1:05.593	18	
Ret	7	(Australia) Chris Vermeulen	Rizla Suzuki MotoGP	Suzuki	6	Retirement	8	

== 250 cc classification ==
Pos.	No.	Rider	Manufacturer	Laps	Time/Retired	Grid	Points
1	36	(Finland) Mika Kallio	KTM	21	48:12.217	3	25
2	4	(Japan) Hiroshi Aoyama	KTM	21	+3.238	11	20
3	75	(Italy) Mattia Pasini	Aprilia	21	+13.811	7	16
4	58	(Italy) Marco Simoncelli	Gilera	21	+18.474	5	13
5	6	(Spain) Alex Debón	Aprilia	21	+21.066	12	11
6	21	(Spain) Héctor Barberá	Aprilia	21	+25.158	2	10
7	72	(Japan) Yuki Takahashi	Honda	21	+29.990	10	9
8	14	(Thailand) Ratthapark Wilairot	Honda	21	+39.871	18	8
9	41	(Spain) Aleix Espargaró	Aprilia	21	+48.344	15	7
10	55	(Spain) Héctor Faubel	Aprilia	21	+55.470	13	6
11	15	(Italy) Roberto Locatelli	Gilera	21	+55.832	9	5
12	19	(Spain) Álvaro Bautista	Aprilia	21	+1:00.442	1	4
13	50	(Republic of Ireland) Eugene Laverty	Aprilia	21	+1:00.732	19	3
14	32	(Italy) Fabrizio Lai	Gilera	21	+1:36.975	16	2
15	45	(Indonesia) Doni Tata Pradita	Yamaha	21	+1:37.080	21	1
16	10	(Hungary) Imre Tóth	Aprilia	21	+1:45.018	22	
17	7	(Spain) Russell Gómez	Aprilia	21	+2:13.718	23	
Ret	25	(Italy) Alex Baldolini	Aprilia	14	Retirement	20	
Ret	60	(Spain) Julián Simón	KTM	5	Retirement	4	
Ret	12	(Switzerland) Thomas Lüthi	Aprilia	5	Retirement	6	
Ret	17	(Czech Republic) Karel Abraham	Aprilia	4	Retirement	17	
Ret	52	(Czech Republic) Lukáš Pešek	Aprilia	2	Retirement	14	
Ret	54	(San Marino) Manuel Poggiali	Gilera	0	Accident	8	
OFFICIAL 250cc REPORT

== 125 cc classification ==
Pos.	No.	Rider	Manufacturer	Laps	Time/Retired	Grid	Points
1	29	(Italy) Andrea Iannone	Aprilia	19	46:02.275	5	25
2	63	(France) Mike Di Meglio	Derbi	19	+3.355	3	20
3	1	(Hungary) Gábor Talmácsi	Aprilia	19	+3.451	4	16
4	44	(Spain) Pol Espargaró	Derbi	19	+14.028	7	13
5	17	(Germany) Stefan Bradl	Aprilia	19	+23.853	8	11
6	6	(Spain) Joan Olivé	Derbi	19	+31.962	6	10
7	60	(Austria) Michael Ranseder	Aprilia	19	+33.758	18	9
8	18	(Spain) Nicolás Terol	Aprilia	19	+34.696	2	8
9	35	(Italy) Raffaele De Rosa	KTM	19	+34.838	14	7
10	7	(Spain) Efrén Vázquez	Aprilia	19	+41.011	19	6
11	12	(Spain) Esteve Rabat	KTM	19	+41.139	22	5
12	93	(Spain) Marc Márquez	KTM	19	+43.677	21	4
13	71	(Japan) Tomoyoshi Koyama	KTM	19	+53.489	24	3
14	51	(United States) Stevie Bonsey	Aprilia	19	+54.462	16	2
15	30	(Spain) Pere Tutusaus	Aprilia	19	+58.706	20	1
16	11	(Germany) Sandro Cortese	Aprilia	19	+59.454	12	
17	77	(Switzerland) Dominique Aegerter	Derbi	19	+1:10.704	13	
18	69	(France) Louis Rossi	Honda	19	+1:47.918	32	
19	56	(Netherlands) Hugo van den Berg	Aprilia	19	+1:50.406	29	
Ret	34	(Switzerland) Randy Krummenacher	KTM	16	Retirement	31	
Ret	45	(United Kingdom) Scott Redding	Aprilia	15	Accident	23	
Ret	8	(Italy) Lorenzo Zanetti	KTM	11	Retirement	26	
Ret	99	(United Kingdom) Danny Webb	Aprilia	10	Accident	10	
Ret	95	(Romania) Robert Mureșan	Aprilia	9	Accident	30	
Ret	5	(France) Alexis Masbou	Loncin	9	Retirement	25	
Ret	21	(Germany) Robin Lässer	Aprilia	7	Accident	27	
Ret	19	(Italy) Roberto Lacalendola	Aprilia	7	Accident	28	
Ret	38	(United Kingdom) Bradley Smith	Aprilia	6	Accident	1	
Ret	24	(Italy) Simone Corsi	Aprilia	5	Retirement	11	
Ret	73	(Japan) Takaaki Nakagami	Aprilia	4	Retirement	17	
Ret	33	(Spain) Sergio Gadea	Aprilia	1	Retirement	9	
DNS	27	(Italy) Stefano Bianco	Aprilia	0	Did not start	15	
DNS	22	(Spain) Pablo Nieto	KTM		Did not start		
DNS	16	(France) Jules Cluzel	Loncin		Did not start		
OFFICIAL 125cc REPORT

== Championship standings after the race (MotoGP) ==
Below are the standings for the top five riders and constructors after round four has concluded.

Riders' Championship standings

Pos.	Rider	Points
1	(Spain) Dani Pedrosa	81
2	(Spain) Jorge Lorenzo	74
3	(Italy) Valentino Rossi	72
4	(Australia) Casey Stoner	56
5	(Italy) Loris Capirossi	33

Constructors' Championship standings

Pos.	Constructor	Points
1	(Japan) Yamaha	90
2	(Japan) Honda	81
3	(Italy) Ducati	56
4	(Japan) Suzuki	34
5	(Japan) Kawasaki	26

- Note: Only the top five positions are included for both sets of standings.

Previous race: 2008 Portuguese Grand Prix	FIM Grand Prix World Championship; 2008 season	Next race: 2008 French Grand Prix
Previous race: 2007 Chinese Grand Prix	Chinese motorcycle Grand Prix	Next race: None
