= 2008 Italian motorcycle Grand Prix =

Coordinates: 43°59′50.7″N 11°22′16.8″E

(Italy) 2008 Italian Grand Prix
Race details
- Race 6 of 18 races in the 2008 Grand Prix motorcycle racing season
- Date: 1 June 2008
- Official name: Gran Premio d'Italia Alice
- Location: Mugello Circuit
- Course: Permanent racing facility; 5.245 km (3.259 mi)

MotoGP
Pole position
- Rider: (Italy) Valentino Rossi
- Time: 1:48.130
Fastest lap
- Rider: (Australia) Casey Stoner
- Time: 1:50.003
Podium
- First: (Italy) Valentino Rossi
- Second: (Australia) Casey Stoner
- Third: (Spain) Dani Pedrosa

250cc
Pole position
- Rider: (Spain) Héctor Barberá
- Time: 1:52.675
Fastest lap
- Rider: (Spain) Álvaro Bautista
- Time: 1:53.669
Podium
- First: (Italy) Marco Simoncelli
- Second: (Spain) Alex Debón
- Third: (Switzerland) Thomas Lüthi

125cc
Pole position
- Rider: (Italy) Raffaele De Rosa
- Time: 1:58.302
Fastest lap
- Rider: (France) Mike Di Meglio
- Time: 1:58.570
Podium
- First: (Italy) Simone Corsi
- Second: (Hungary) Gábor Talmácsi
- Third: (Spain) Pol Espargaró

The 2008 Italian motorcycle Grand Prix was the sixth round of the 2008 MotoGP championship. It took place on the weekend of 30 May – 1 June 2008 at the Mugello Circuit. It marked Valentino Rossi's seventh consecutive victory at the Italian motorcycle Grand Prix, a run which was to be finally broken the following year by Casey Stoner.

== MotoGP classification ==
Pos.	No.	Rider	Team	Manufacturer	Laps	Time/Retired	Grid	Points
1	46	(Italy) Valentino Rossi	Fiat Yamaha Team	Yamaha	23	42:31.153	1	25
2	1	(Australia) Casey Stoner	Ducati Marlboro Team	Ducati	23	+2.201	4	20
3	2	(Spain) Dani Pedrosa	Repsol Honda Team	Honda	23	+4.867	2	16
4	15	(San Marino) Alex de Angelis	San Carlo Honda Gresini	Honda	23	+6.313	10	13
5	5	(United States) Colin Edwards	Tech 3 Yamaha	Yamaha	23	+12.530	5	11
6	52	(United Kingdom) James Toseland	Tech 3 Yamaha	Yamaha	23	+13.806	8	10
7	65	(Italy) Loris Capirossi	Rizla Suzuki MotoGP	Suzuki	23	+14.447	3	9
8	4	(Italy) Andrea Dovizioso	JiR Team Scot MotoGP	Honda	23	+15.319	13	8
9	56	(Japan) Shinya Nakano	San Carlo Honda Gresini	Honda	23	+15.327	9	7
10	7	(Australia) Chris Vermeulen	Rizla Suzuki MotoGP	Suzuki	23	+30.785	11	6
11	50	(France) Sylvain Guintoli	Alice Team	Ducati	23	+39.621	17	5
12	24	(Spain) Toni Elías	Alice Team	Ducati	23	+50.021	16	4
13	69	(United States) Nicky Hayden	Repsol Honda Team	Honda	23	+50.440	6	3
14	8	(Japan) Tadayuki Okada	Repsol Honda Team	Honda	23	+58.849	15	2
15	13	(Australia) Anthony West	Kawasaki Racing Team	Kawasaki	23	+1:00.736	19	1
Ret	48	(Spain) Jorge Lorenzo	Fiat Yamaha Team	Yamaha	6	Accident	7	
Ret	21	(United States) John Hopkins	Kawasaki Racing Team	Kawasaki	6	Accident	14	
Ret	14	(France) Randy de Puniet	LCR Honda MotoGP	Honda	5	Accident	12	
Ret	33	(Italy) Marco Melandri	Ducati Marlboro Team	Ducati	5	Accident	18	

== 250 cc classification ==
Pos.	No.	Rider	Manufacturer	Laps	Time/Retired	Grid	Points
1	58	(Italy) Marco Simoncelli	Gilera	21	40:19.910	3	25
2	6	(Spain) Alex Debón	Aprilia	21	+0.499	7	20
3	12	(Switzerland) Thomas Lüthi	Aprilia	21	+0.712	8	16
4	36	(Finland) Mika Kallio	KTM	21	+7.403	4	13
5	75	(Italy) Mattia Pasini	Aprilia	21	+12.542	9	11
6	15	(Italy) Roberto Locatelli	Gilera	21	+12.790	18	10
7	17	(Czech Republic) Karel Abraham	Aprilia	21	+16.114	16	9
8	4	(Japan) Hiroshi Aoyama	KTM	21	+17.316	10	8
9	41	(Spain) Aleix Espargaró	Aprilia	21	+19.642	14	7
10	14	(Thailand) Ratthapark Wilairot	Honda	21	+19.704	17	6
11	60	(Spain) Julián Simón	KTM	21	+19.751	13	5
12	25	(Italy) Alex Baldolini	Aprilia	21	+47.360	21	4
13	50	(Republic of Ireland) Eugene Laverty	Aprilia	21	+47.422	20	3
14	32	(Italy) Fabrizio Lai	Gilera	21	+1:13.423	15	2
15	10	(Hungary) Imre Tóth	Aprilia	21	+1:25.891	19	1
16	7	(Spain) Russell Gómez	Aprilia	21	+1:36.557	22	
17	45	(Indonesia) Doni Tata Pradita	Yamaha	21	+1:48.224	23	
Ret	21	(Spain) Héctor Barberá	Aprilia	19	Accident	1	
Ret	72	(Japan) Yuki Takahashi	Honda	17	Accident	11	
Ret	52	(Czech Republic) Lukáš Pešek	Aprilia	9	Accident	5	
Ret	55	(Spain) Héctor Faubel	Aprilia	9	Accident	12	
Ret	54	(San Marino) Manuel Poggiali	Gilera	9	Accident	6	
Ret	19	(Spain) Álvaro Bautista	Aprilia	6	Accident	2	
OFFICIAL 250cc REPORT

== 125 cc classification ==
Pos.	No.	Rider	Manufacturer	Laps	Time/Retired	Grid	Points
1	24	(Italy) Simone Corsi	Aprilia	20	39:59.020	8	25
2	1	(Hungary) Gábor Talmácsi	Aprilia	20	+0.019	2	20
3	44	(Spain) Pol Espargaró	Derbi	20	+0.036	4	16
4	63	(France) Mike Di Meglio	Derbi	20	+0.135	3	13
5	38	(United Kingdom) Bradley Smith	Aprilia	20	+0.178	7	11
6	33	(Spain) Sergio Gadea	Aprilia	20	+0.490	5	10
7	18	(Spain) Nicolás Terol	Aprilia	20	+0.832	9	9
8	11	(Germany) Sandro Cortese	Aprilia	20	+3.865	6	8
9	6	(Spain) Joan Olivé	Derbi	20	+3.928	14	7
10	17	(Germany) Stefan Bradl	Aprilia	20	+5.439	11	6
11	51	(United States) Stevie Bonsey	Aprilia	20	+10.244	13	5
12	29	(Italy) Andrea Iannone	Aprilia	20	+10.447	12	4
13	35	(Italy) Raffaele De Rosa	KTM	20	+18.366	1	3
14	45	(United Kingdom) Scott Redding	Aprilia	20	+23.201	16	2
15	60	(Austria) Michael Ranseder	Aprilia	20	+24.440	18	1
16	73	(Japan) Takaaki Nakagami	Aprilia	20	+26.631	15	
17	34	(Switzerland) Randy Krummenacher	KTM	20	+30.629	19	
18	7	(Spain) Efrén Vázquez	Aprilia	20	+30.730	25	
19	93	(Spain) Marc Márquez	KTM	20	+33.868	23	
20	8	(Italy) Lorenzo Zanetti	KTM	20	+36.928	31	
21	30	(Spain) Pere Tutusaus	Aprilia	20	+49.951	32	
22	40	(Italy) Lorenzo Savadori	Aprilia	20	+50.038	22	
23	16	(France) Jules Cluzel	Loncin	20	+50.040	24	
24	77	(Switzerland) Dominique Aegerter	Derbi	20	+50.052	26	
25	12	(Spain) Esteve Rabat	KTM	20	+56.360	20	
26	47	(Italy) Riccardo Moretti	Honda	20	+1:06.247	35	
27	5	(France) Alexis Masbou	Loncin	20	+1:06.566	38	
28	21	(Germany) Robin Lässer	Aprilia	20	+1:06.982	33	
29	56	(Netherlands) Hugo van den Berg	Aprilia	20	+1:09.266	28	
30	42	(Italy) Luca Vitali	Aprilia	20	+1:10.551	38	
31	43	(Italy) Gabriele Ferro	Honda	20	+1:10.567	34	
32	69	(France) Louis Rossi	Honda	20	+1:36.451	37	
33	39	(Italy) Ferrucio Lamborghini	Aprilia	20	+1:39.883	36	
34	95	(Romania) Robert Mureșan	Aprilia	18	+2 laps	30	
Ret	99	(United Kingdom) Danny Webb	Aprilia	19	Accident	17	
Ret	71	(Japan) Tomoyoshi Koyama	KTM	16	Retirement	10	
Ret	19	(Italy) Roberto Lacalendola	Aprilia	11	Retirement	29	
Ret	22	(Spain) Pablo Nieto	KTM	8	Retirement	27	
Ret	27	(Italy) Stefano Bianco	Aprilia	2	Accident	21	
OFFICIAL 125cc REPORT

== Championship standings after the race (MotoGP) ==
Below are the standings for the top five riders and constructors after round six has concluded.

Riders' Championship standings

Pos.	Rider	Points
1	(Italy) Valentino Rossi	122
2	(Spain) Dani Pedrosa	110
3	(Spain) Jorge Lorenzo	94
4	(Australia) Casey Stoner	76
5	(United States) Colin Edwards	58

Constructors' Championship standings

Pos.	Constructor	Points
1	(Japan) Yamaha	140
2	(Japan) Honda	110
3	(Italy) Ducati	81
4	(Japan) Suzuki	54
5	(Japan) Kawasaki	29

- Note: Only the top five positions are included for both sets of standings.

Previous race: 2008 French Grand Prix	FIM Grand Prix World Championship; 2008 season	Next race: 2008 Catalan Grand Prix
Previous race: 2007 Italian Grand Prix	Italian motorcycle Grand Prix	Next race: 2009 Italian Grand Prix
