= 2008 CEV 125cc season =

Junior Motorcycle World Championship

2008 FIM JuniorGP World Championship
Previous:	2007	Next:	2009

The 2008 CEV 125cc season is the eleventh season of the CEV 125cc season. The season was held over 7 races at 7 meetings, beginning on 20 April at Circuit Ricardo Tormo and finished on 16 November at Circuito de Jerez.

Efrén Vázquez won the title after beating closest rival Luis Salom by 16 points.

== Calendar ==
2009 Calendar
Round	Date	Circuit	Pole position	Fastest lap	Race winner	Winning constructor
1	20 April	(Spain) Valencia 1	(Spain) Efrén Vázquez	(Spain) Adrián Martín	(Germany) Marcel Schrötter	(Japan) Honda
2	25 May	(Spain) Catalunya	(Spain) Efrén Vázquez	(Netherlands) Joey Litjens	(Netherlands) Joey Litjens	(Germany) Seel
3	15 June	(Spain) Jerez 1	(Spain) Efrén Vázquez	(Spain) Luis Salom	(Spain) Luis Salom	(Italy) Aprilia
4	27 July	(Spain) Albacete 1	(Spain) Adrián Martín	(Spain) Alberto Moncayo	(Spain) Efrén Vázquez	(Italy) Aprilia
5	21 September	(Spain) Albacete 2	(Spain) Alberto Moncayo	(Italy) Lorenzo Savadori	(Spain) Alberto Moncayo	(Spain) Derbi
6	9 November	(Spain) Valencia 2	(Switzerland) Randy Krummenacher	(Spain) Efrén Vázquez	(Spain) Luis Salom	(Italy) Aprilia
7	16 November	(Spain) Jerez 2	(Switzerland) Randy Krummenacher	(Switzerland) Randy Krummenacher	(Switzerland) Randy Krummenacher	(Italy) Aprilia

== Entry list ==
Team	Constructor	No.	Rider	Rounds
(Spain) Alpo Atletico de Madrid Team	Aprilia	10	(Spain) Cristian Trabalón	1–6
(Spain) Alpo Atletico de Madrid Team	Aprilia	30	(Spain) Pere Tutusaus	5–7
(Italy) Angaia Sebimoto Racing	Aprilia	11	(Italy) Luca Marconi	7
(Italy) Angaia Sebimoto Racing	Aprilia	99	(Czech Republic) Lukáš Šembera	All
(Spain) Aspar Team CEV–Curvacero	Aprilia	16	(Spain) Òscar Climent	All
(Spain) Aspar Team CEV–Curvacero	Aprilia	22	(United Kingdom) Kyle Smith	2–7
(Spain) Aspar Team CEV–Curvacero	Aprilia	26	(Spain) Adrián Martín	5–7
(Spain) Aspar Team CEV–Curvacero	Aprilia	30	(Spain) Pere Tutusaus	1–4
(Spain) Aspar Team CEV–Curvacero	Aprilia	49	(United States) P. J. Jacobsen	6–7
(Spain) Bancaja MIR	Aprilia	26	(Spain) Adrián Martín	1–4
(Spain) Bancaja MIR	Aprilia	84	(Spain) Julián Miralles	All
(Spain) Bancaja MIR	Aprilia	89	(Spain) Isaac Viñales	5
(Spain) Bancaja MIR	Aprilia	91	(Spain) Isaac Viñales	6–7
(Spain) Bancaja MIR	Aprilia	94	(Spain) Javier Cholbi	4–5
(Spain) Blusens BQR	Aprilia	7	(Spain) Efrén Vázquez	All
(Spain) Blusens BQR	Aprilia	13	(Italy) Dino Lombardi	1–2
(Spain) Blusens BQR	Aprilia	39	(Spain) Luis Salom	6–7
(Spain) Blusens BQR	Aprilia	45	(United Kingdom) Scott Redding	2
(Czech Republic) Czech Road Racing Junior Team	Aprilia	82	(Czech Republic) Karel Pešek	6–7
(Netherlands) DeGraaf Grand Prix Team	Aprilia	21	(Netherlands) Jerry van de Bunt	1–2, 4–7
(Netherlands) DeGraaf Grand Prix Team	Aprilia	43	(Netherlands) Roy Pouw	1–2, 4–5
(Netherlands) DeGraaf Grand Prix Team	Aprilia	44	(Switzerland) Randy Krummenacher	6–7
(Netherlands) DeGraaf Grand Prix Team	Aprilia	53	(Spain) Antonio Alarcos	7
(Italy) Ellegi Racing	Aprilia	9	(Italy) Luigi Morciano	5
(Italy) Ellegi Racing	Aprilia	9	(Italy) Riccardo Russo	6
(Italy) Ellegi Racing	Aprilia	29	(Italy) Nicolas Stizza	3, 5
(Italy) Ellegi Racing	Aprilia	71	(Italy) Mattia Tarozzi	5, 7
(Spain) Gaviota Prosolia Racing Team Quinto	Aprilia	41	(Spain) Daniel Sáez	All
(Spain) Gaviota Prosolia Racing Team Quinto	Aprilia	83	(Spain) Aitor Cremades	7
(Spain) H43 Team Hernandez	Aprilia	58	(Norway) Sturla Fagerhaug	4–5
(Spain) H43 Team Hernandez	Aprilia	64	(Spain) Joaquín Fernández	1–3
(Spain) H43 Team Hernandez	Aprilia	76	(Spain) Luis Miguel Mora	1–4, 6–7
(Spain) / (Italy) Hune Matteoni Lodis	Aprilia	27	(Spain) Borja Maestro	2–3, 5–7
(Spain) / (Italy) Hune Matteoni Lodis	Aprilia	28	(Spain) Iván Maestro	All
(Spain) JC Racing	Aprilia	32	(Spain) Pedro Rodriguez	6
(Spain) Llados Racing Team	Aprilia	88	(Spain) Amadeo Llados	All
(Spain) MC Santa Pola	Aprilia	69	(Spain) Alvaro Alcala	1
(Spain) Pons Racing	Aprilia	4	(Spain) Axel Pons	1–3, 6–7
(Spain) Pons Racing	Aprilia	64	(Spain) Joaquín Fernández	4, 6–7
(France) Provence Moto Sport	Aprilia	85	(France) Clément Dunikowski	6
(Italy) RCGM Team	Aprilia	46	(Italy) Lorenzo Savadori	3, 5
(Italy) RCGM Team	Aprilia	51	(Italy) Luca Vitali	3, 5
(Spain) RZT Racing	Aprilia	23	(Spain) Eneko Esteban	1–5
(Spain) RZT Racing	Aprilia	39	(Spain) Luis Salom	1–5
(Spain) SPORT RACING	Aprilia	64	(Spain) Joaquín Fernández	5
(Spain) Team Flecha	Aprilia	31	(Spain) Alberto Roca	4
(Spain) Team Machado	Aprilia	19	(Spain) Carlos Ferrando	1–3, 5–7
(Italy) Team Matteoni–Semprucci	Aprilia	11	(Italy) Luca Marconi	6
(Italy) Team Matteoni–Semprucci	Aprilia	71	(Italy) Mattia Tarozzi	6
(Italy) Team Matteoni–Semprucci	Aprilia	78	(Italy) Alessandro Tonucci	6–7
(United Kingdom) Team Sabresport; Repli–Cast UK	Aprilia	25	(United Kingdom) Adam Blacklock	1–2, 4, 6
(Germany) Team Sachsenring	Aprilia	55	(Netherlands) Tony Coveña	1
(Germany) Team Sachsenring	Aprilia	56	(Germany) Toni Finsterbusch	1
(Germany) Team Sachsenring	Aprilia	57	(Germany) Eric Hübsch	1
(Spain) TCR Competicion	Aprilia	17	(Spain) Eduard López	2–7
(Spain) Tey Racing	Aprilia	66	(Spain) Alejandro Casuso	All
(Spain) Tey Racing	Aprilia	73	(Spain) Antonio Alarte	All
(Spain) Tey Racing	Aprilia	86	(France) Johann Zarco	7
(Spain) Tey Racing	Aprilia	91	(Spain) David Mataix	4
(Spain) VHC Team Racing	Aprilia	12	(Spain) Joan Miras	2
(Spain) TCR Competicion	Derbi	17	(Spain) Eduard López	1
(Spain) Team Andalucia Derbi	Derbi	48	(Spain) Alberto Moncayo	All
(Spain) Team Andalucia Derbi	Derbi	77	(Spain) Ricard Cardús	All
(Japan) 7C Racing	Honda	68	(Australia) Glenn Scott	All
(France) BRS Racing Team	Honda	94	(Switzerland) Damien Raemy	6
(Czech Republic) Czech Road Racing Junior Team	Honda	62	(Czech Republic) Ladislav Chmelík	6
(Netherlands) Dutch Racing Team	Honda	69	(Netherlands) Michael van der Mark	6–7
Equipe de France Espoir	Honda	90	(France) Florian Marino	4–6
Equipe de France Espoir	Honda	90	(France) Kevin Meco	7
Equipe de France Espoir	Honda	96	(France) Cyril Carrillo	4–5
Equipe de France Espoir	Honda	96	(France) Grégory Di Carlo	6
Equipe de France Espoir	Honda	96	(France) Robin Camus	7
(Czech Republic) Eurowag Junior Racing	Honda	8	(Czech Republic) Andrea Toušková	6–7
(Czech Republic) FGR Racing	Honda	84	(Czech Republic) Jakub Kornfeil	6
(Czech Republic) Jafferson Racing Team	Honda	75	(Czech Republic) Jakub Jantulík	6
(Germany) Kiefer Junior Racing Team	Honda	74	(Germany) Marvin Fritz	6–7
(United Kingdom) KRP	Honda	5	(United States) Kyle Ferris	6–7
(United Kingdom) KRP	Honda	6	(United Kingdom) James Lodge	6
(United Kingdom) KRP	Honda	50	(United Kingdom) Timothy Hastings	4, 6–7
(United Kingdom) KRP	Honda	93	(United Kingdom) Martin Glossop	4, 6–7
(Spain) Lorenzo Competicion	Honda	36	(Spain) Joan Perelló	1–5, 7
(Spain) Montalvo Racing	Honda	98	(Spain) José Luis Montalvo	1
(Spain) Motoracing Estrella	Honda	79	(Spain) Daniel Ruiz	1
(Spain) MS Racing Team	Honda	78	(Germany) Marcel Schrötter	1
(Spain) Racing Edna	Honda	11	(Spain) Javier Sánchez	5
(Spain) Racing Edna	Honda	79	(Spain) Gabriel Pie	2
(Spain) RC Recouso Sport	Honda	95	(Spain) Rubén Herrera	All
(United Kingdom) Replicast UK Racing	Honda	40	(United Kingdom) Alec Wright	1–2
(Netherlands) RV Racing Team	Honda	61	(Netherlands) Ernst Dubbink	1–2
(Spain) SAG Castrol	Honda	11	(Spain) Javier Sánchez	2
(Spain) SAG Castrol	Honda	33	(Spain) Jordi Dalmau	All
(Spain) SAG Castrol	Honda	35	(Spain) Ian Castro	4
(Spain) SAG Castrol	Honda	37	(Japan) Kazuya Otani	All
(Spain) Team Clima Cartagena	Honda	92	(Spain) Javier Segado	4–5
(United Kingdom) Team Luyten	Honda	44	(United Kingdom) Jackson Leigh-Smith	2
(Spain) Team Rodas Racing	Honda	54	(Spain) Antonio Rodas	1, 3, 5, 7
(Spain) TMR Competicion	Honda	24	(Spain) Josep Rodríguez	All
(Spain) Tomasi Merson	Honda	47	(Spain) Alberto Tomasi	5
(Spain) Xtreme Racing Team	Honda	12	(Spain) Ornella Ongaro	6
(France) C.D'Albi; LRT	KTM	63	(France) Valentin Debise	1, 4–7
(France) C.D'Albi; LRT	KTM	87	(France) Quentin Jacquet	1, 6–7
(Spain) KTM Monlau Competicion	KTM	34	(Spain) Edgar García	1–3, 5–6
(Spain) KTM Monlau Competicion	KTM	34	(Spain) Enrique Jerez	7
(Spain) KTM Monlau Competicion	KTM	53	(Spain) Antonio Alarcos	1–3, 5–6
(Austria) Red Bull MotoGP Academy	KTM	15	(France) Nelson Major	3–4
(Austria) Red Bull MotoGP Academy	KTM	52	(United Kingdom) Danny Kent	All
(Austria) Red Bull MotoGP Academy	KTM	59	(United States) J. D. Beach	6–7
(Austria) Red Bull MotoGP Academy	KTM	97	(United States) Cameron Beaubier	1–3, 5–7
(Austria) Red Bull MotoGP Academy	KTM	97	(United States) J. D. Beach	4
(Austria) / (Spain) Repsol KTM 125	KTM	14	(Spain) Johnny Rosell	All
(Italy) Team Rumi	Rumi	40	(Italy) Nicolo Lagiongada	7
(Netherlands) Abbink Bos Racing	Seel	18	(Netherlands) Jasper Iwema	1–2, 4–7
(Netherlands) Abbink Bos Racing	Seel	38	(Netherlands) Joey Litjens	1–2, 4–7
(Netherlands) Abbink Bos Racing	Seel	81	(Germany) Meyer Katrin	6–7
(United Kingdom) Colin Appleyard Macadam	Seel	42	(United Kingdom) Deane Brown	6–7
(United Kingdom) Colin Appleyard Macadam	Seel	60	(United Kingdom) Josh Elliott	6–7
(Germany) Freudenberg Racing Team	Seel	56	(Germany) Toni Finsterbusch	6
(Germany) Freudenberg Racing Team	Seel	89	(Germany) Daniel Kartheininger	6
(Germany) Rentzsch Racing Team	Seel	20	(France) Nicolas Dorsch	6–7

== Championship standings ==
Pos.	Rider	Bike	VAL1 (Spain)	CAT (Spain)	JER 1 (Spain)	ALB 1 (Spain)	ALB 2 (Spain)	VAL2 (Spain)	JER 2 (Spain)	Pts
1	(Spain) Efrén Vázquez	Aprilia	Ret^{P}	5^{P}	3^{P}	1	2	2^{F}	2	112
2	(Spain) Luis Salom	Aprilia	3	15	1^{F}	Ret	3	1	4	96
3	(Spain) Pere Tutusaus	Aprilia	4	Ret	2	3	6	4	3	79
4	(Spain) Alberto Moncayo	Derbi	17	18	6	2^{F}	1^{P}	5	5	77
5	(Spain) Adrián Martín	Aprilia	2^{F}	Ret	5	Ret^{P}	9	3	6	64
6	(Netherlands) Joey Litjens	Seel	10	1^{F}		Ret	8	10	7	54
7	(Spain) Ricard Cardús	Derbi	4	9	11	4	4	Ret	13	54
8	(Japan) Kazuya Otani	Honda	13	Ret	10	5	7	11	17	34
9	(United Kingdom) Danny Kent	KTM	8	12	14	Ret	Ret	7	11	28
10	(Switzerland) Randy Krummenacher	Aprilia						Ret^{P}	1^{P} ^{F}	25
11	(Germany) Marcel Schrötter	Honda	1							25
12	(Spain) Julián Miralles	Aprilia	5	19	9	Ret	16	9	16	25
13	(Czech Republic) Lukáš Šembera	Aprilia	20	Ret	16	6	25	8	9	25
14	(Spain) Iván Maestro	Aprilia	5	6	Ret	Ret	DNS	14	8	25
15	(Spain) Daniel Sáez	Aprilia	Ret	2	15	Ret	Ret	13	Ret	24
16	(Italy) Lorenzo Savadori	Aprilia			4		5^{F}			24
17	(Spain) Cristian Trabalón	Aprilia	6	16	7	Ret	17	24		19
18	(United States) Cameron Beaubier	KTM	7	Ret	DNS		19	6	Ret	19
19	(Spain) Axel Pons	Aprilia	Ret	3	DNS			16	14	18
20	(Spain) Amadeo Llados	Aprilia	9	20	12	11	14	DNQ	Ret	18
21	(Netherlands) Jasper Iwema	Seel	24	10		12	12	12	DNQ	18
22	(United Kingdom) Scott Redding	Aprilia		4						13
23	(Norway) Sturla Fagerhaug	Aprilia				10	10			12
24	(Spain) Joaquín Fernández	Aprilia	15	21	21	7	20	27	24	10
25	(Spain) Òscar Climent	Aprilia	14	22	8	Ret	27	22	22	10
26	(Spain) Eduard López	Derbi	16							10
26	(Spain) Eduard López	Aprilia		17	18	8	15	Ret	15	10
27	(Spain) Jordi Dalmau	Honda	22	7	19	17	DSQ	DNQ	DNQ	9
28	(Spain) Alejandro Casuso	Aprilia	18	8	23	20	Ret	DNQ	DNQ	8
29	(Spain) Antonio Alarte	Aprilia	DNQ	11	30	13	DNQ	DNQ	DNQ	8
30	(United Kingdom) Kyle Smith	Aprilia		Ret	17	9	DNS	Ret	18	7
31	(Netherlands) Michael van der Mark	Honda						15	10	7
32	(Spain) Carlos Ferrando	Aprilia	Ret	14	DNS		Ret	17	12	6
33	(Spain) Isaac Viñales	Aprilia					11	Ret	20	5
34	(France) Nelson Major	KTM			13	14				5
35	(Italy) Luigi Morciano	Aprilia					13			3
36	(Italy) Dino Lombardi	Aprilia	29	13						3
37	(United Kingdom) Adam Blacklock	Aprilia	Ret	DNQ		15		DNQ		1
	(Netherlands) Jerry van de Bunt	Aprilia	23	24		16	21	DNQ	Ret	0
	(United States) J. D. Beach	KTM				Ret		18	23	0
	(United Kingdom) Martin Glossop	Honda				18		DNQ	26	0
	(Spain) Johnny Rosell	KTM	Ret	Ret	DNS	Ret	18	Ret	Ret	0
	(Germany) Eric Hübsch	Aprilia	19							0
	(France) Valentin Debise	KTM	26			19	23	23	25	0
	(Italy) Alessandro Tonucci	Aprilia						Ret	19	0
	(Italy) Luca Marconi	Aprilia						19	Ret	0
	(Italy) Luca Vitali	Aprilia			20		34			0
	(Germany) Marvin Fritz	Honda						20	Ret	0
	(Spain) Borja Maestro	Aprilia		27	Ret		22	28	21	0
	(Spain) Eneko Esteban	Aprilia	21	Ret	26	DNQ	DNQ			0
	(Australia) Glenn Scott	Honda	Ret	Ret	Ret	Ret	28	21	DNQ	0
	(France) Florian Marino	Honda				21	29	DNQ		0
	(Spain) Antonio Alarcos	KTM	27	Ret	22		Ret	DNQ		0
	(Spain) Antonio Alarcos	Aprilia							Ret	0
	(United Kingdom) Timothy Hastings	Honda				22		DNQ	28	0
	(United Kingdom) Alec Wright	Honda	25	23						0
	(Spain) Joan Perelló	Honda	DNQ	DNQ	28	23	DNQ		DNQ	0
	(Italy) Nicolas Stizza	Aprilia			24		26			0
	(Spain) Edgar García	KTM	Ret	Ret	DNS		24	Ret		0
	(Spain) Javier Segado	Honda				24	DNQ			0
	(Spain) David Mataix	Aprilia				25				0
	(Spain) Antonio Rodas	Honda	DNQ		25		DNQ		DNQ	0
	(Italy) Mattia Tarozzi	Aprilia					DNQ	25	DNQ	0
	(Spain) Javier Sánchez	Honda		25			DNQ			0
	(Netherlands) Roy Pouw	Aprilia	DNQ	26		DNS	32			0
	(Czech Republic) Karel Pešek	Aprilia						26	DNQ	0
	(Spain) Rubén Herrera	Honda	DNQ	DNQ	27	DNQ	33	DNQ	DNQ	0
	(United Kingdom) Deane Brown	Seel						DNQ	27	0
	(Spain) Daniel Ruiz	Honda	28							0
	(Netherlands) Ernst Dubbink	Honda	30	28						0
	(Spain) Luis Miguel Mora	Aprilia	DNQ	DNQ	29	DNQ		DNQ	DNQ	0
	(Spain) Josep Rodríguez	Honda	DNQ	DNQ	DNS	DNQ	30	DNQ	DNQ	0
	(France) Cyril Carrillo	Honda				Ret	31			0
	(United States) P. J. Jacobsen	Aprilia						Ret	Ret	0
	(Spain) Enrique Jerez	KTM							Ret	0
	(France) Johann Zarco	Aprilia							Ret	0
	(Italy) Nicolo Lagiongada	Rumi							Ret	0
	(France) Clément Dunikowski	Aprilia						Ret		0
	(Switzerland) Damien Raemy	Honda						Ret		0
	(Italy) Riccardo Russo	Aprilia						Ret		0
	(Germany) Toni Finsterbusch	Aprilia	Ret							0
	(Germany) Toni Finsterbusch	Seel						DNQ		0
	(Spain) Javier Cholbi	Aprilia				Ret	DNQ			0
	(Spain) Ian Castro	Honda				Ret				0
	(United Kingdom) Jackson Leigh-Smith	Honda		Ret						0
	(Spain) Alvaro Alcala	Aprilia	Ret							0
	(France) Quentin Jacquet	KTM	DNQ					DNQ	DNQ	
	(Czech Republic) Andrea Toušková	Honda						DNQ	DNQ	
	(United Kingdom) Josh Elliott	Seel						DNQ	DNQ	
	(United States) Kyle Ferris	Honda						DNQ	DNQ	
	(Germany) Meyer Katrin	Seel						DNQ	DNQ	
	(France) Nicolás Dorsch	Seel						DNQ	DNQ	
	(Spain) Aitor Cremades	Aprilia							DNQ	
	(France) Kevin Meco	Honda							DNQ	
	(France) Robin Camus	Honda							DNQ	
	(Germany) Daniel Kartheininger	Seel						DNQ		
	(France) Grégory Di Carlo	Honda						DNQ		
	(Czech Republic) Jakub Kornfeil	Honda						DNQ		
	(Czech Republic) Jakub Jantulík	Honda						DNQ		
	(United Kingdom) James Lodge	Honda						DNQ		
	(Czech Republic) Ladislav Chmelík	Honda						DNQ		
	(Spain) Ornella Ongaro	Honda						DNQ		
	(Spain) Pedro Rodriguez	Aprilia						DNQ		
	(Spain) Alberto Tomasi	Honda					DNQ			
	(Spain) Alberto Roca	Aprilia				DNQ				
	(Spain) Roger Pie	Honda		DNQ						
	(Spain) Joan Miras	Aprilia		DNQ						
	(Spain) José Luis Montalvo	Honda	DNQ							
	(Netherlands) Tony Coveña	Aprilia	DNQ							
Pos.	Rider	Bike	VAL1 (Spain)	CAT (Spain)	JER 1 (Spain)	ALB 1 (Spain)	ALB 2 (Spain)	VAL2 (Spain)	JER 2 (Spain)	Pts

Colour	Result
Gold	Winner
Silver	Second place
Bronze	Third place
Green	Points classification
Blue	Non-points classification
Blue	Non-classified finish (NC)
Purple	Retired, not classified (Ret)
Red	Did not qualify (DNQ)
Red	Did not pre-qualify (DNPQ)
Black	Disqualified (DSQ)
White	Did not start (DNS)
White	Withdrew (WD)
White	Race cancelled (C)
Blank	Did not practice (DNP)
Blank	Did not arrive (DNA)
Blank	Excluded (EX)

P – Pole position
F – Fastest lap
