= Chmelík (surname) =

Chmelík (feminine: Chmelíková) is a Czech and Slovak surname. It is a diminutive form of the surname Chmel. These surnames are derived from the word chmel (i.e. 'hops'), which denoted someone who grew, traded or processed hops, or someone who enjoyed beer. Notable people with the surname include:

- Ladislav Chmelík, Czech motorcycle racer
- Ľuboš Chmelík (born 1989), Slovak footballer

== See also ==
- Chmelík, a municipality and village in the Czech Republic
