= Brad Gross =

Brad Gross may refer to:

- Brad Gross (motorcyclist) (born 1990), Australian motorcycle racer
- Brad Gross (racing driver), American racing driver
