= 2009 Grand Prix motorcycle racing season =

Sports season

2009 F.I.M. Grand Prix motorcycle racing season

Seasons
- ← 2008 2010 →

2009 World Champions

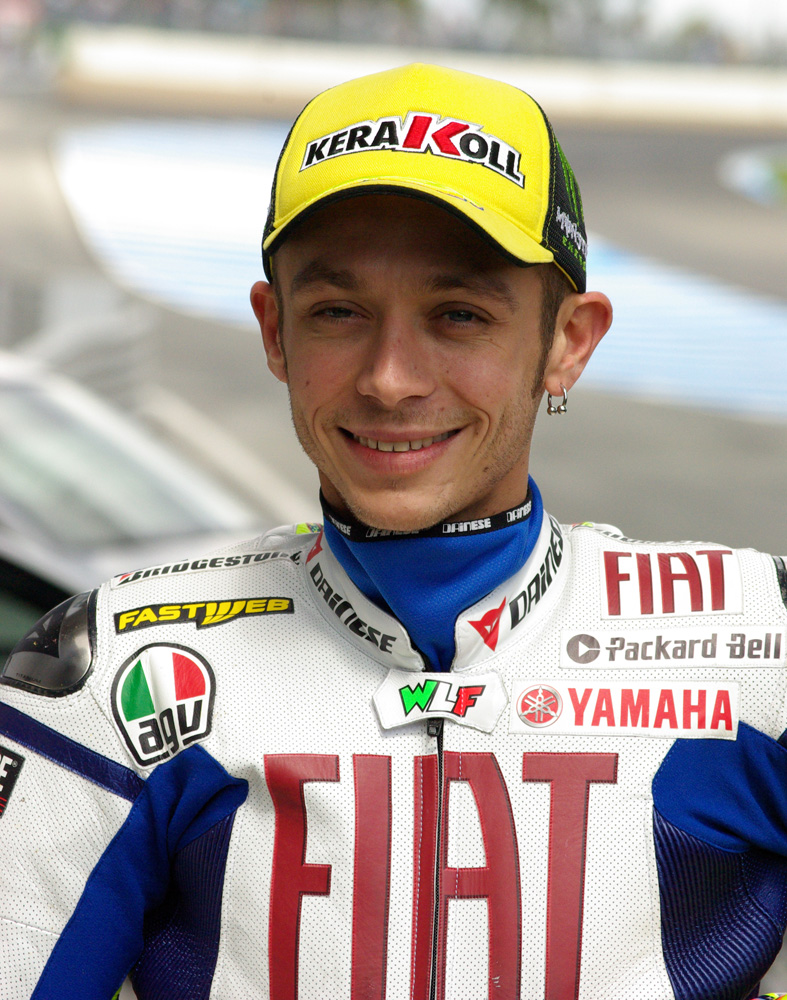
Valentino Rossi became the MotoGP World Champion

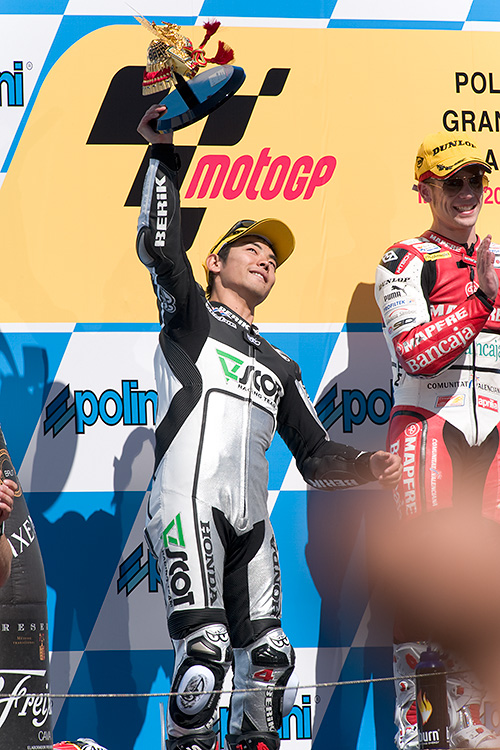
Hiroshi Aoyama became the 250cc World Champion

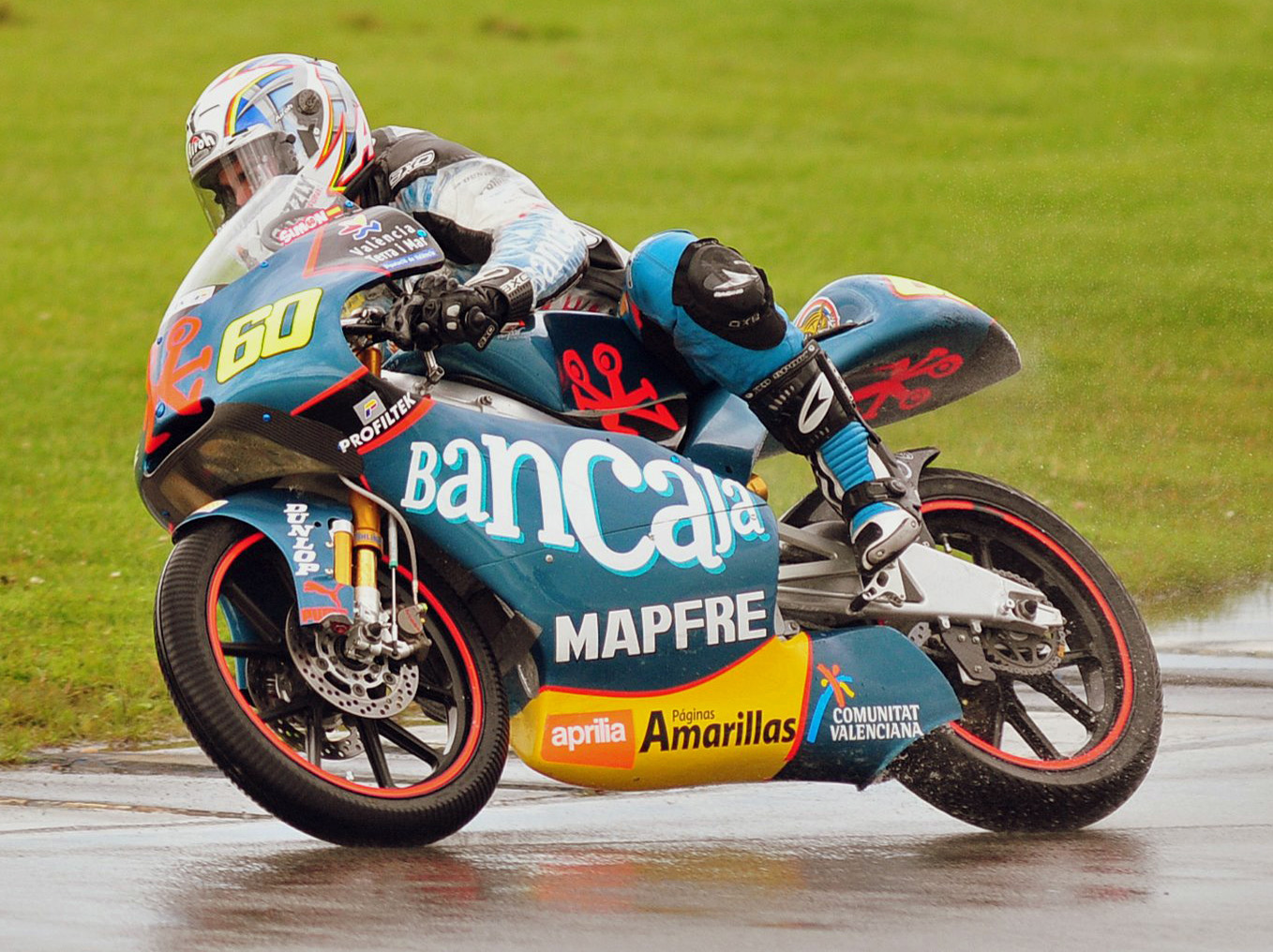
Julián Simón became the 125cc World Champion

The 2009 Grand Prix motorcycle racing season was the 61st F.I.M. Road Racing World Championship season. The season consisted out of 17 races for the MotoGP class and 16 for the 125cc and 250cc classes, beginning with the Qatar motorcycle Grand Prix on 12 April 2009 and ending with the Valencian Community motorcycle Grand Prix on 8 November.

== Preseason ==
=== Cost-cutting measures ===
As announced during 2008, MotoGP class switched to a single-tyre manufacturer ending a previous Tyre war between Dunlop, Bridgestone, and Michelin that started in the 2002 season (though Dunlop left as a tyre manufacturer in 2007). The move was made to try to improve safety by reducing cornering speeds, and in a marginal way for cost reasons; the winner was decided by bid. Michelin, one of the two tyre suppliers in 2008, decided not to bid for the supply, effectively declaring Bridgestone the winner, which was confirmed on 18 October 2008. Bridgestone will be the sole tyre supplier from 2009 to 2011. Only race spec tyres will be provided to the teams, eliminating qualifying tyres, in use until 2008.

Other cost-cutting manoeuvers were made during the winter prior to the season, to try to contain the rising costs of the sport, especially during the 2008 financial crisis. FIM was especially concerned, fearing that defections among private and factory teams could leave the grid with 14 bikes only.

After negotiations between FIM, Dorna and MSMA (the manufacturers' association), new measures were adopted. The Friday morning free practice session was eliminated, limiting the Friday practice time to a single 45-minute session (later brought to a 1-hour session from the French GP onwards); a limit of 5 engines was imposed for the last 7 races, with a 10-point penalty for each additional engine used; ceramic composite materials for brakes were banned; electronic assistance was reduced with the ban of electronic controlled suspensions and launch control systems; Monday tests will be cancelled except for Catalunya and Brno, where only test riders will be allowed to take part.

=== Kawasaki withdrawal and return ===
With a somewhat unexpected announcement, Kawasaki made public its intention to withdraw from MotoGP immediately on 9 January 2009, citing the global economic downturn as the main cause of the decision. Initial negotiations between Dorna and Kawasaki aimed to run the two bikes with the private Aspar team, but after further talks, on 26 February 2009 Kawasaki announced its decision to remain in the category, running a single bike team with Marco Melandri, effectively leaving John Hopkins without a contract. The team ran under the Hayate Racing banner, as announced on 1 March 2009.

== Season review ==
=== MotoGP ===
Valentino Rossi won his sixth MotoGP title, seventh in the top class and ninth title in total after getting the better of teammate Jorge Lorenzo in a season-long battle. The season was marked by the dominance of Yamaha duo Rossi and Lorenzo, with occasional wins for Dani Pedrosa and Casey Stoner. Riding the factory Ducati, 2007 champion Stoner won the opener in Qatar as well as a rain-hit race in Italy to open up a championship lead after six rounds. Inconsistent handling from the Ducati as well as health problems for Stoner causing fatigue saw him drop out of the title fight by mid-season, whereas Pedrosa and Lorenzo crashed more often than Rossi who built up a sizeable lead to win the title.

=== 250cc class ===
In the final 250cc championship (it was replaced by the Moto2 class in 2010), Hiroshi Aoyama became the third Japanese rider to win that title, after Tetsuya Harada and Daijiro Kato.

=== 125cc class ===
In the 125cc class, Julián Simón won the title after taking seven victories during the season.

== 2009 Grand Prix season calendar ==
The following Grands Prix were scheduled to take place in 2009:

The 2009 revised race schedule was released on 24 October 2008. A Hungarian round was originally scheduled for 20 September 2009 but the organizers asked Dorna to postpone the event to 2010 due to delays in the construction of the Balatonring circuit.

Due to adverse weather conditions, the Qatar MotoGP race was postponed until 13 April.

Round	Date	Grand Prix	Circuit
1	12–13 April ‡	Commercialbank Grand Prix of Qatar	Losail International Circuit
2	26 April	Polini Grand Prix of Japan	Twin Ring Motegi
3	3 May	(Spain) Gran Premio bwin.com de España	Circuito de Jerez
4	17 May	Grand Prix de France	Bugatti Circuit
5	31 May	(Italy) Gran Premio d'Italia Alice	Mugello Circuit
6	14 June	(Catalonia) Gran Premi Cinzano de Catalunya	Circuit de Catalunya
7	27 June ††	(Netherlands) Alice TT Assen	TT Circuit Assen
8	5 July †	(United States) Red Bull U.S. Grand Prix	Mazda Raceway Laguna Seca
9	19 July	(Germany) Alice Motorrad Grand Prix Deutschland	Sachsenring
10	26 July	(United Kingdom) British Grand Prix	Donington Park
11	16 August	(Czech Republic) Cardion ab Grand Prix České republiky	Brno Circuit
12	30 August	Red Bull Indianapolis Grand Prix	Indianapolis Motor Speedway
13	6 September	Gran Premio Cinzano di San Marino e Della Riviera di Rimini	Misano World Circuit
14	4 October	bwin.com Grande Prémio de Portugal	Autódromo do Estoril
15	18 October	(Australia) Iveco Australian Grand Prix	Phillip Island Grand Prix Circuit
16	25 October	(Malaysia) Shell Advance Malaysian Motorcycle Grand Prix	Sepang International Circuit
17	8 November	(Valencian Community) GP Generali de la Comunitat Valenciana	Circuit Ricardo Tormo

‡ = Night race, MotoGP race held on Monday because of rainfall on Sunday.
† = MotoGP class only
†† = Saturday race

=== Calendar changes ===
- The Japanese Grand Prix was moved forward, from 28 September to 26 April.
- The Portuguese Grand Prix was moved back, from 13 April to 4 October.
- The Chinese Grand Prix was taken off the calendar due to a dire spectator attendance, poor promotion and an overall lack of commercial interest in the venue.
- The British Grand Prix was moved back, from 22 June to 26 July.
- Only the MotoGP class raced during the United States Grand Prix because of a Californian law on air pollution, preventing the 125 and 250cc classes from racing.

== Regulation changes ==
The following changes are made to the regulation for the 2009 season:

=== Sporting regulations ===
A big overhaul has been made to the standard time schedule for all days. The Friday morning Free Practice session will be cancelled for all three classes and the three MotoGP Practice Sessions, as well as Saturday Qualifying, will be shortened from one hour to 45 minutes. Warm-Up times and Race distances are not altered.

For the Free Practice one sessions on Friday, the times are now as follows:

- FP1 from 13:05 to 13:45 for the 125cc class.
- FP1 from 14:05 to 14:50 for the MotoGP class.
- FP1 from 15:05 to 15:50 for the 250cc class.

For the Free Practice two and Qualifying Practice sessions on Saturday, the times are now as follows:

- FP2 from 09:05 to 09:45 for the 125cc class.
- FP2 from 10:05 to 10:50 for the MotoGP class.
- FP2 from 11:05 to 11:50 for the 250cc class.
- QP from 13:05 to 13:45 for the 125cc class.
- QP from 14:05 to 14:50 for the MotoGP class.
- QP from 15:05 to 15:50 for the 250cc class.

For the Warm-Up and Race sessions on Sunday, the times are now as follows:

- WUP from 08:40 to 09:00 for the 125cc class.
- WUP from 09:10 to 09:30 for the MotoGP class.
- WUP from 09:40 to 10:00 for the 250cc class.
- Race from 11:00 to 12:00 for the 125cc class.
- Race from 12:15 to 13:15 for the 250cc class.
- Race from 14:00 to 15:00 for the MotoGP class.

Only two post-race tests are now allowed. The circuits chosen are the Catalan and Czech ones and the tests are only allowed if they are for development purposes and if test riders are used.

These rules were additionally added on the 25th of July 2009:

- The rules for practice restrictions have been updated. For the purpose of practice restrictions, the year is split into two parts: the season itself and the winter. The season is defined as 'the period starting fourteen days before the first race of the year and ending two days after the last race of the year, both dates being inclusive'. The winter is defined as 'the rest of the year, starting four days after the last race of the season and ending fifteen days before the first race of the next season, both dates being inclusive.'
- Using riders under contract to practice with MotoGP bikes is not allowed during the season as well as the breaks at any track included on the current year's calendar. The following exceptions to this rule apply if:
  - The practice is added to the event schedule.
  - The practice happens during the day(s) immediately after the race at three circuits, at the circuit where the race has occurred. The final race of the season will always be held at one of the three circuits and will be the only two-day test which is allowed. The others will only consist out of one test day. The other two circuits must be nominated by the Grand Prix Commission by 31 January of that year.
  - The activity has been specifically approved by the Race Direction.

The same goes for the winter period. It is forbidden to use contracted riders to practice with MotoGP at any circuit. The following exceptions apply to this rule if:

- There's a maximum of six days where Dorna/IRTA organise official tests at tracks which were added to the calendars of the previous or next year. No testing is allowed during the period between 1 December of one year and 31 January of the next year, both dates being inclusive. The winter test schedule must be approved the Grand Prix Commission.
- The activity has been specifically approved by the Race Direction.

Rules for the practice by non-contracted riders have been changed. The practice by non-contracted or test riders is permitted at any circuit at all times, but is limited specifically by the use of a maximum of 240 tyres per manufacturer, per calendar year, which is solely supplied by the MotoGP tyre supplier. There is an exception to this rule however and it is forbidden to test during the season and the breaks at a circuit included on the calendar before the race there has happened. Nonetheless, manufacturers can designate and inform the Race Direction of the two circuits where they can test before 31 January of each year, but not within fourteen days of the scheduled event at the circuits. Said schedule of these tests and any following amendments must have to be told to the Race Direction at least seven days ahead of time.

The definition of a 'contracted rider' and a 'rookie rider' have been clarified. A contracted rider is a rider who has ridden in nine or more events during a single season. A rookie is a rider who is submitted by a participating team for participation in the full season but is not a contracted rider as is defined in the same class in any past season. For the purpose of this section, the old 500cc and MotoGP class are considered to be the same as well as the current 250cc, which will be renamed to the Moto2 class in 2010.

This rule was additionally added on the 24th of August 2009:

- All the MotoGP Practice and Qualifying sessions are going to be extended again, from 45 minutes to one hour as of the French Grand Prix onwards.

=== Technical regulations ===
- In September 2008, it was decided that from 2009 onwards there will only be a single tyre manufacturer for the MotoGP class. Proposals could be sent in to the FIM and Dorna until 3 October 2008 after which the eventual winner were to be announced by the Grand Prix Commission on 18 October 2008. Bridgestone sent in a bid whilst supplying rival Michelin, did not. The eventual proposal was studied and on 18 October, it was announced that Bridgestone were to become the sole tyre supplier for a three-year period.
- From the Czech Republic GP onwards, a maximum of five engines will only be allowed for use in the final eight races of the season. Changing parts is not allowed, with the exception of daily maintenance.
- Composite materials made out of ceramic is now forbidden to use on the brake discs or pads.
- A launch control system is now prohibited.
- A suspension which is controlled by electronics is now prohibited as well.

These rules were additionally added on the 25th of July 2009:

- Rules on the engine durability have been greatly extended. In the MotoGP class, the number of available engines to use for all riders is limited. For 2009, a maximum of five engines for the final seven scheduled races of the season starting from the 2009 Czech Grand Prix until the end of the season. If a rider is replaced for any given reason, the replacement rider will be considered as the original rider so that the engine can be granted. The available engines for the exclusive use of each rider has to marked and sealed by the Technical Director before it can be used. The team has the responsibility to register any new engine with the Technical Directed before it can be used. Once it is registered and used for the first time, the engines can not be swapped between riders even if they are from the same team. A new engine is considered to be used when the bike with said engine crosses the transponder timing point at the pitlane exit. The engines will be sealed via wiring and identification tabs so that:
  - The timing system is not within each. For example, the head cover has to be wired to the cylinder head.
  - The timing driving system is not within each. For example, the geartrain/chain cover is wired so that it can't be taken off.
  - The cylinder head as well as the cylinder block (if there are any) can't be removed from the engine. For example, the cylinder head is wired to the cylinder block and the cylinder block is wired to the engine crankcase.

- The crankcase can't be opened. For example, the crankcase halves are wired together.

Teams are allowed to replace all the parts which can be accessed without having to remove the sealing wiring. If the sealing wiring is broken or removed without direction by the Technical Direction, the engine will be considered "rebuilt" and engines with broken or missing security seals will be treated as a wholly new engine in the allocation. If a competitor, for any reason (mechanical failure, crash, major damage and so on) has to use another engine above their allocation, the Technical Director has to be informed before said engine can be used so that the Race Direction can apply the proper penalty. The damaged engine will be removed from the allocation and, if it is to be used again, will be treated as a new engine with the fitting penalty applied. There is no limit to the number of times a sealed, allocated engine can be fitted to and used in a bike, on the condition that the security seal is not broken or removed. Replacing an engine with another sealed engine, be it new or used, from the rider's allocation is allowed and no penalty shall be given if done. To prevent the running of a used, allocated engine outside of any MotoGP races, all the allocated engines will have security seals placed over either the exhaust or inlet ports (on at least one cylinder bank if the engine is a V-type) before it can leave the circuit. If a team wants to re-use such an allocated and sealed engine, it must first request to the Technical Director to remove all security seals. If the Technical Director or his staff discover that the security seals are not intact, the engine will be branded as a new engine in the allocation and a penalty will be handed out.

- Any Exhaust Gas Recirculation (also known as EGR) systems are now prohibited.
- It is forbidden to use any hydraulic and/or pneumatic pressurised powered systems, the exception being cylinder inlet/exhaust valve springs. All hydraulic systems on the bike have to be powered only by the manual inputs of the rider. Normal hydraulic hand and foot controls such as master/slave cylinders for the brakes and clutch are allowed, as are pneumatic engine valve actuating systems and oil and water pumps for entine lubricating and cooling. Using engine lubricating oil for any motive other than lubrication and cooling (such as powered hydraulic systems) is forbidden.
- All bikes must have a minimum of one brake on each wheel which operates in an independent way.
- In the 125cc and 250cc classes, brake discs which consist out of ferrous materials only are permitted.
- In all classes, materials made out of ceramic composite are not allowed for the brake discs or the brake pads. Ceramic materials are defined as "inorganic, non metallic solids (for example: Al_{2}O_{3}, SiC, B_{4}C, Ti_{5}Si_{3}, SiO_{2} and Si_{3}N_{4})".
- Electric and electronic controlled suspension and steering damper systems are forbidden. Changes to the suspension and steering damper systems can only be made via manual inputs and mechanical/hydraulic changes.
- Racing numbers have to be attached to the front as well as both sides of the bike. For the MotoGP class, only the front number is required.
- Numbers should have a height of at least 140 mm.
- Numbers have to be clearly readable and strongly differ from the background colour.
- Backgrounds have to be of a single colour over a large enough area to provide a minimum clear area of 25 mm around the number.
- In the case of a dispute over the readability of numbers, the decision taken by the Technical Direction will be concluding.

== 2009 Grand Prix season results ==
Round	Date	Grand Prix	Circuit	125cc winner	250cc winner	MotoGP winner	Report
1	12–13 April ‡	Qatar motorcycle Grand Prix	Losail	(Italy) Andrea Iannone	(Spain) Héctor Barberá	(Australia) Casey Stoner	Report
2	26 April	(Japan) Japanese motorcycle Grand Prix	Motegi	(Italy) Andrea Iannone	(Spain) Álvaro Bautista	(Spain) Jorge Lorenzo	Report
3	3 May	(Spain) Spanish motorcycle Grand Prix	Jerez	(United Kingdom) Bradley Smith	(Japan) Hiroshi Aoyama	(Italy) Valentino Rossi	Report
4	17 May	(France) French motorcycle Grand Prix	Le Mans	(Spain) Julián Simón	(Italy) Marco Simoncelli	(Spain) Jorge Lorenzo	Report
5	31 May	(Italy) Italian motorcycle Grand Prix	Mugello	(United Kingdom) Bradley Smith	(Italy) Mattia Pasini	(Australia) Casey Stoner	Report
6	14 June	(Catalonia) Catalan motorcycle Grand Prix	Catalunya	(Italy) Andrea Iannone	(Spain) Álvaro Bautista	(Italy) Valentino Rossi	Report
7	27 June ††	(Netherlands) Dutch TT	Assen	(Spain) Sergio Gadea	(Japan) Hiroshi Aoyama	(Italy) Valentino Rossi	Report
8	5 July †	United States motorcycle Grand Prix	Laguna Seca	No 125cc and 250cc race		(Spain) Dani Pedrosa	Report
9	19 July	(Germany) German motorcycle Grand Prix	Sachsenring	(Spain) Julián Simón	(Italy) Marco Simoncelli	(Italy) Valentino Rossi	Report
10	26 July	(United Kingdom) British motorcycle Grand Prix	Donington	(Spain) Julián Simón	(Japan) Hiroshi Aoyama	(Italy) Andrea Dovizioso	Report
11	16 August	Czech Republic motorcycle Grand Prix	Brno	(Spain) Nicolás Terol	(Italy) Marco Simoncelli	(Italy) Valentino Rossi	Report
12	30 August	Indianapolis motorcycle Grand Prix	Indianapolis	(Spain) Pol Espargaró	(Italy) Marco Simoncelli	(Spain) Jorge Lorenzo	Report
13	6 September	San Marino and Rimini Riviera motorcycle Grand Prix	Misano	(Spain) Julián Simón	(Spain) Héctor Barberá	(Italy) Valentino Rossi	Report
14	4 October	(Portugal) Portuguese motorcycle Grand Prix	Estoril	(Spain) Pol Espargaró	(Italy) Marco Simoncelli	(Spain) Jorge Lorenzo	Report
15	18 October	(Australia) Australian motorcycle Grand Prix	Phillip Island	(Spain) Julián Simón	(Italy) Marco Simoncelli	(Australia) Casey Stoner	Report
16	25 October	(Malaysia) Malaysian motorcycle Grand Prix	Sepang	(Spain) Julián Simón	(Japan) Hiroshi Aoyama	(Australia) Casey Stoner	Report
17	8 November	Valencian Community motorcycle Grand Prix	Valencia	(Spain) Julián Simón	(Spain) Héctor Barberá	(Spain) Dani Pedrosa	Report

‡ = Night race, MotoGP race held on Monday because of rainfall on Sunday.
† = MotoGP class only
†† = Saturday Race

== Participants ==
All entries taken from the official MotoGP site.

=== MotoGP participants ===
Team	Constructor	Motorcycle	No.	Rider	Rounds
(Italy) Ducati Marlboro Team; Ducati Team (rd 8 and 12)	Ducati	Desmosedici GP9	27	(Australia) Casey Stoner	1–10, 14–17
(Italy) Ducati Marlboro Team; Ducati Team (rd 8 and 12)	Ducati	Desmosedici GP9	36	(Finland) Mika Kallio	11–13
(Italy) Ducati Marlboro Team; Ducati Team (rd 8 and 12)	Ducati	Desmosedici GP9	69	(United States) Nicky Hayden	All
(Italy) Pramac Racing	Ducati	Desmosedici GP9	36	(Finland) Mika Kallio	1–7, 9–10, 14–17
(Italy) Pramac Racing	Ducati	Desmosedici GP9	84	(Italy) Michel Fabrizio	11
(Italy) Pramac Racing	Ducati	Desmosedici GP9	44	(Spain) Aleix Espargaró	12–13
(Italy) Pramac Racing	Ducati	Desmosedici GP9	88	(Italy) Niccolò Canepa	1–15
(Italy) Pramac Racing	Ducati	Desmosedici GP9	44	(Spain) Aleix Espargaró	16–17
(Spain) Grupo Francisco Hernando	Ducati	Desmosedici GP9	59	(Spain) Sete Gibernau	1–3, 6–8
(Japan) Repsol Honda Team	Honda	RC212V	3	(Spain) Dani Pedrosa	All
(Japan) Repsol Honda Team	Honda	RC212V	4	(Italy) Andrea Dovizioso	All
(Italy) San Carlo Honda Gresini	Honda	RC212V	15	(San Marino) Alex de Angelis	All
(Italy) San Carlo Honda Gresini	Honda	RC212V	24	(Spain) Toni Elías	All
(Monaco) LCR Honda MotoGP	Honda	RC212V	14	(France) Randy de Puniet	All
(San Marino) Scot Racing Team MotoGP	Honda	RC212V	72	(Japan) Yuki Takahashi	1–7
(San Marino) Scot Racing Team MotoGP	Honda	RC212V	41	(Hungary) Gábor Talmácsi	6–17
(Switzerland) Hayate Racing Team	Kawasaki	Ninja ZX-RR	33	(Italy) Marco Melandri	All
(Japan) Rizla Suzuki MotoGP	Suzuki	GSV-R	7	(Australia) Chris Vermeulen	All
(Japan) Rizla Suzuki MotoGP	Suzuki	GSV-R	65	(Italy) Loris Capirossi	All
(Japan) Fiat Yamaha Team	Yamaha	YZR-M1	46	(Italy) Valentino Rossi	All
(Japan) Fiat Yamaha Team	Yamaha	YZR-M1	99	(Spain) Jorge Lorenzo	All
(Japan) Sterilgarda Yamaha Team	Yamaha	YZR-M1	11	(United States) Ben Spies	17
(France) Monster Yamaha Tech 3	Yamaha	YZR-M1	5	(United States) Colin Edwards	All
(France) Monster Yamaha Tech 3	Yamaha	YZR-M1	52	(United Kingdom) James Toseland	All

Key
Regular rider
Wildcard rider
Replacement rider

- All entries used Bridgestone tyres.

=== 250cc participants ===
Team	Constructor	Motorcycle	No.	Rider	Rounds
Scot Racing Team 250cc	Honda	Honda RS250RW	4	(Japan) Hiroshi Aoyama	1–7, 9–17
Scot Racing Team 250cc	Honda	Honda RS250RW	35	(Italy) Raffaele De Rosa	1–7, 9–17
Aeropuerto-Castello-Blusens	Aprilia	Aprilia RSA 250	6	(Spain) Alex Debón	1–7, 9–17
Pepe World Team	Aprilia	Aprilia RSW 250 LE	7	(Spain) Axel Pons	1–7, 9–17
Pepe World Team	Aprilia	Aprilia RSA 250	40	(Spain) Héctor Barberá	1–7, 9–17
Racing Team Germany	Honda	Honda RS250R	8	(Switzerland) Bastien Chesaux	1–7, 9–13
Racing Team Germany	Honda	Honda RS250R	73	(Japan) Shuhei Aoyama	14–17
Team Toth Aprilia	Aprilia	Aprilia RSW 250 LE	10	(Hungary) Imre Tóth	1–2
Team Toth Aprilia	Aprilia	Aprilia RSA 250	10	(Hungary) Imre Tóth	3–7, 9–13
Team Toth Aprilia	Aprilia	Aprilia RSV 250 kit	10	(Hungary) Imre Tóth	14–17
Team Toth Aprilia	Aprilia	Aprilia RSA 250	75	(Italy) Mattia Pasini	1–7, 9–13
Team Globalgest	Aprilia	Aprilia RSA 250	75	(Italy) Mattia Pasini	14
Paddock GP Racing Team	Aprilia	Aprilia RSA 250	75	(Italy) Mattia Pasini	15–17
Emmi–Caffè Latte	Aprilia	Aprilia RSA 250	12	(Switzerland) Thomas Lüthi	1–7, 9–17
Auto Kelly – CP	Aprilia	Aprilia RSW 250 LE	52	(Czech Republic) Lukáš Pešek	1–7, 9–17
Thai PTT Honda SAG	Honda	Honda RS250RW	14	(Thailand) Ratthapark Wilairot	1–7, 9–17
Metis Gilera	Gilera	Gilera RSA 250	15	(Italy) Roberto Locatelli	1–7, 9–17
Metis Gilera	Gilera	Gilera RSA 250	58	(Italy) Marco Simoncelli	1–7, 9–17
Matteoni Racing	Aprilia	Aprilia RSW 250 LE	16	(France) Jules Cluzel	1–7, 9–17
Matteoni Racing	Aprilia	Aprilia RSW 250 LE	77	(Spain) Aitor Rodríguez	10–11, 13
Matteoni Racing	Aprilia	Aprilia RSW 250 LE	8	(Switzerland) Bastien Chesaux	14–17
Matteoni Racing	Aprilia	Aprilia RSW 250 LE	88	(Italy) Christopher Moretti	14
Cardion AB Motoracing	Aprilia	Aprilia RSA 250	17	(Czech Republic) Karel Abraham	1–7, 9–17
Mapfre Aspar Team 250cc	Aprilia	Aprilia RSA 250	19	(Spain) Álvaro Bautista	1–7, 9–17
Mapfre Aspar Team 250cc	Aprilia	Aprilia RSW 250 LE	63	(France) Mike Di Meglio	1–5
Mapfre Aspar Team 250cc	Aprilia	Aprilia RSA 250	63	(France) Mike Di Meglio	6–7, 9–17
Balatonring Team	Aprilia	Aprilia RSA 250	28	(Hungary) Gábor Talmácsi	1–3
Balatonring Team	Aprilia	Aprilia RSA 250	47	(Spain) Ángel Rodríguez	4
Balatonring Team	Aprilia	Aprilia RSW 250 LE	11	(Hungary) Balázs Németh	5–6, 10–17
Balatonring Team	Aprilia	Aprilia RSW 250 LE	41	(Spain) Aleix Espargaró	7, 9
WTR San Marino Team	Aprilia	Aprilia RSW 250 LE	25	(Italy) Alex Baldolini	1–7, 9–17
CIP MotoGP250	Honda	Honda RS250R	48	(Japan) Shoya Tomizawa	1–7, 9–17
CIP MotoGP250	Honda	Honda RS250R	53	(France) Valentin Debise	3–7, 9–17
Valencia CF Honda SAG	Honda	Honda RS250RW	55	(Spain) Héctor Faubel	1–7, 9–17
Viessmann Kiefer Racing	Aprilia	Aprilia RSW 250 LE	56	(Russia) Vladimir Leonov	1–7, 9, 11–17
Viessmann Kiefer Racing	Aprilia	Aprilia RSW 250 LE	95	(Germany) Ralf Waldmann	10
Milar – Juegos Lucky	Aprilia	Aprilia RSV 250 kit	77	(Spain) Aitor Rodríguez	1–4
Milar – Juegos Lucky	Aprilia	Aprilia RSV 250 kit	37	(Spain) Daniel Arcas	5
Milar – Juegos Lucky	Aprilia	Aprilia RSV 250 kit	51	(United States) Stevie Bonsey	6
Milar – Juegos Lucky	Aprilia	Aprilia RSV 250 kit	80	(United States) Stevie Bonsey	7
Milar – Juegos Lucky	Aprilia	Aprilia RSV 250 kit	76	(Spain) Iván Maestro	3
Longevity Racing	Yamaha	Yamaha TZ 250	29	(United States) Barrett Long	12
Rat Racing	Yamaha	Yamaha TZ 250	30	(Canada) Adam Roberts	12
Bigman Racing	Honda	Honda RS250R	33	(Republic of Ireland) William Dunlop	17
C&L Racing	Honda	Honda RS250R	54	(United Kingdom) Toby Markham	3–7
C&L Racing	Aprilia	Aprilia RSW 250 LE	54	(United Kingdom) Toby Markham	11, 13
Bardral Racing with SJ-R	Yamaha	Yamaha TZ 250	59	(Japan) Kazuki Watanabe	2
Sabresport Grand Prix	Aprilia	Aprilia RSW 250 LE	64	(United Kingdom) Luke Mossey	10
Yamaha Road Racing Team	Yamaha	Yamaha TZ 250	65	(Germany) Marcel Becker	9
Nordgren Racing	Honda	Honda RS250R	66	(Sweden) Joakim Stensmö	9
Promotion Scandinavia AB	Aprilia	Aprilia RSW 250 LE	67	(Sweden) Robin Halen	9–10
Dennis Trollope Racing	Yamaha	Yamaha TZ 250	68	(United Kingdom) Alex Kenshington	10
Harc-Pro	Honda	Honda RS250R	73	(Japan) Shuhei Aoyama	2

Key
Regular rider
Wildcard rider
Replacement rider

- With the exception of Japanese wildcard riders, who used Bridgestone, all entries used Dunlop tyres.

=== 125cc participants ===
Team	Constructor	Motorcycle	No.	Rider	Rounds
Loncin Racing	Loncin	Loncin	5	(France) Alexis Masbou	1–7, 9–12
Loncin Racing	Loncin	Loncin	71	(Japan) Tomoyoshi Koyama	1–7, 9–17
Loncin Racing	Loncin	Loncin	21	(Czech Republic) Jakub Kornfeil	13–17
Derbi Racing Team	Derbi	Derbi RSA 125	6	(Spain) Joan Olivé	1–7, 9–17
Derbi Racing Team	Derbi	Derbi RSA 125	7	(Spain) Efrén Vázquez	1–7, 9–17
Derbi Racing Team	Derbi	Derbi RSA 125	44	(Spain) Pol Espargaró	1–7, 9–17
Ongetta Team I.S.P.A.	Aprilia	Aprilia RSA 125	8	(Italy) Lorenzo Zanetti	1–7, 9–17
Ongetta Team I.S.P.A.	Aprilia	Aprilia RSA 125	29	(Italy) Andrea Iannone	1–7, 9–17
Ongetta Team I.S.P.A.	Aprilia	Aprilia RS 125 R	73	(Japan) Takaaki Nakagami	1–7, 9–17
Ongetta Team I.S.P.A.	Aprilia	Aprilia RS 125 R	94	(Germany) Jonas Folger	1–7, 9–17
CBC Corse	Aprilia	Aprilia RS 125 R	10	(Italy) Luca Vitali	1–7, 9–17
CBC Corse	Aprilia	Aprilia RS 125 R	87	(Italy) Luca Marconi	1–7, 9–17
CBC Corse	Aprilia	Aprilia RS 125 R	88	(Austria) Michael Ranseder	9–17
Ajo Interwetten	Derbi	Derbi RSA 125	11	(Germany) Sandro Cortese	1–7, 9–17
Ajo Interwetten	Derbi	Derbi RSA 125	77	(Switzerland) Dominique Aegerter	1–7, 9–17
Blusens Aprilia	Aprilia	Aprilia RSA 125	12	(Spain) Esteve Rabat	1–7, 9–17
Blusens Aprilia	Aprilia	Aprilia RSA 125	45	(United Kingdom) Scott Redding	1–7, 9–17
Blusens Aprilia	Aprilia	Aprilia RS 125 R	43	(Spain) Johnny Rosell	6, 14
WTR San Marino Team	Aprilia	Aprilia RS 125 R	14	(France) Johann Zarco	1–7, 9–17
Red Bull KTM Motorsport	KTM	KTM 125 FRR	16	(United States) Cameron Beaubier	1–7, 9–11, 13–17
Red Bull KTM Motorsport	KTM	KTM 125 FRR	93	(Spain) Marc Márquez	1–7, 9–17
Red Bull KTM Motorsport	KTM	KTM 125 FRR	50	(Norway) Sturla Fagerhaug	4, 6, 14, 17
Viessman Kiefer Racing	Aprilia	Aprilia RSA 125	17	(Germany) Stefan Bradl	1–7, 9–17
Jack&Jones Team	Aprilia	Aprilia RSA 125	18	(Spain) Nicolás Terol	1–7, 9–17
Jack&Jones Team	Aprilia	Aprilia RSA 125	39	(Spain) Luis Salom	7, 9–17
Jack&Jones Team	Aprilia	Aprilia RSA 125	24	(Italy) Simone Corsi	1–6
Fontana Racing	Aprilia	Aprilia RSA 125	24	(Italy) Simone Corsi	7, 9–17
Fontana Racing	Aprilia	Aprilia RS 125 R	32	(Italy) Lorenzo Savadori	1–7, 9–13
Matteoni Racing	Aprilia	Aprilia RS 125 R	19	(France) Quentin Jacquet	14–17
Matteoni Racing	Aprilia	Aprilia RS 125 R	69	(Czech Republic) Lukáš Šembera	1–7, 9–12
Bancaja Aspar Team 125cc	Aprilia	Aprilia RSA 125	33	(Spain) Sergio Gadea	1–7, 9–17
Bancaja Aspar Team 125cc	Aprilia	Aprilia RSA 125	38	(United Kingdom) Bradley Smith	1–7, 9–17
Bancaja Aspar Team 125cc	Aprilia	Aprilia RSA 125	60	(Spain) Julián Simón	1–7, 9–17
Degraaf Grand Prix	Aprilia	Aprilia RSA 125	35	(Switzerland) Randy Krummenacher	1–7, 9–17
Degraaf Grand Prix	Aprilia	Aprilia RSA 125	99	(United Kingdom) Danny Webb	1–7, 9–17
Degraaf Grand Prix	Honda	Honda RS125R	47	(Australia) Blake Leigh-Smith	16
Racing Team Germany	Honda	Honda RS125R	53	(Netherlands) Jasper Iwema	1–7, 9–11, 13–17
Haojue Team	Haojue	Haojue 125	66	(United Kingdom) Matthew Hoyle	1–4
Haojue Team	Haojue	Haojue 125	88	(Austria) Michael Ranseder	1–4
Dydo Miu Racing	Honda	Honda RS125R	55	(Japan) Hiroomi Iwata	2
Okegawajuku & Endurance	Honda	Honda RS125R	56	(Japan) Yuma Yahagi	2
Okegawajuku & Endurance	Honda	Honda RS125R	57	(Japan) Yuki Oogane	2
18 Grage Racing	Honda	Honda RS125R	58	(Japan) Yuuichi Yanagisawa	2
Endurance & Osl	Honda	Honda RS125R	59	(Japan) Satoru Kamada	2
SAG-Castrol	Honda	Honda RS125R	31	(Spain) Jordi Dalmau	3, 6, 14
SAG-Castrol	Honda	Honda RS125R	39	(Spain) Luis Salom	3, 6
SAG-Castrol	Honda	Honda RS125R	95	(Spain) Joan Perelló	17
TCR Competicion	Aprilia	Aprilia RS 125 R	40	(Spain) Eduard López	3
Hune Racing Team-TMM	Aprilia	Aprilia RS 125 R	41	(Spain) Borja Maestro	3
Hune Racing Team-TMM	Aprilia	Aprilia RS 125 R	76	(Spain) Iván Maestro	17
Andalucia Aprilia	Aprilia	Aprilia RS 125 R	42	(Spain) Alberto Moncayo	3, 6, 14, 17
TJP-TVX Racing	Honda	Honda RS125R	36	(France) Cyril Carrillo	4
Equipe de France	Honda	Honda RS125R	48	(France) Grégory Di Carlo	4
Xtrem Racing Team	Honda	Honda RS125R	49	(France) Ornella Ongaro	4
Villiers Team Competition	Honda	Honda RS125R	52	(France) Steven Le Coquen	4
Elligi Racing	Aprilia	Aprilia RS 125 R	51	(Italy) Riccardo Moretti	5, 13
Junior GP Racing Dream	Aprilia	Aprilia RS 125 R	61	(Italy) Luigi Morciano	5, 11, 13
Junior GP Racing Dream	Aprilia	Aprilia RS 125 R	62	(Italy) Alessandro Tonucci	5, 11, 13
Junior GP Racing Dream	Aprilia	Aprilia RS 125 R	63	(Italy) Gennaro Sabatino	5
Junior GP Racing Dream	Aprilia	Aprilia RS 125 R	32	(Italy) Lorenzo Savadori	17
CRP Racing	Honda	Honda RS125R	64	(Italy) Davide Stirpe	5
Dutch Racing Team	Honda	Honda RS125R	82	(Netherlands) Michael van der Mark	7
Racing Team Bijsterbosch	Honda	Honda RS125R	83	(Netherlands) Pepijn Bijsterbosch	7
Team Holland	Aprilia	Aprilia RS 125 R	84	(Netherlands) Roy Pouw	7
LHF-Project Racing	Honda	Honda RS125R	85	(Germany) Marvin Fritz	7
Pesek Team	Derbi	Derbi RS 125 R	86	(Czech Republic) Karel Pešek	7, 10–11
Freudenberg Racing	Honda	Honda RS125R	76	(Germany) Toni Finsterbusch	9
Freudenberg Racing	Honda	Honda RS125R	79	(Germany) Daniel Kartheininger	9
Toni-Mang Racing	Honda	Honda RS125R	78	(Germany) Marcel Schrötter	9, 11
RBS Honda	Honda	Honda RS125R	80	(Switzerland) Damien Raemy	9
Ajo Motorsport	Honda	Honda RS125R	81	(Finland) Eeki Kuparinen	9
KRP/Bradley Smith Racing	Honda	Honda RS125R	89	(United Kingdom) James Lodge	10
KRP/Bradley Smith Racing	Honda	Honda RS125R	90	(United Kingdom) Timothy Hastings	10
KRP/Bradley Smith Racing	Honda	Honda RS125R	91	(United Kingdom) Martin Glossop	10
KRP/Bradley Smith Racing	Honda	Honda RS125R	92	(Republic of Ireland) Paul Jordan	10
Moto FGR	Honda	Honda RS125R	67	(Czech Republic) Ladislav Chmelik	11
Team Migomoto	Honda	Honda RS125R	68	(Croatia) Ivan Višak	11
Veloce Racing	Aprilia	Aprilia RS 125 R	74	(United States) Ben Young	12
Veloce Racing	Aprilia	Aprilia RS 125 R	75	(United States) Miles Thornton	12
Grillini Bridgestone Racing	Aprilia	Aprilia RS 125 R	65	(Italy) Gabriele Ferro	13
JJ Racing	Aprilia	Aprilia RS 125 R	70	(Slovakia) Jakub Jantulík	13–14
Mavin Industries	Honda	Honda RS125R	30	(Australia) Dylan Mavin	15
Champions Race Days	Honda	Honda RS125R	54	(Australia) Andrew Lawson	15
RSW Racing	Aprilia	Aprilia RS 125 R	96	(Australia) Nicky Diles	15
Gross Racing	Yamaha	Yamaha TZ125	97	(Australia) Brad Gross	15
Racetrix/Angelo's Aluminium	Honda	Honda RS125R	98	(Australia) Levi Day	15
Air Asia Team Malaysia	Yamaha	Yamaha TZ125	23	(Malaysia) Muhammad Zulfahmi	16
Air Asia Team Malaysia	Aprilia	Aprilia RS 125 R	28	(Malaysia) Elly Ilias	16

Key
Regular rider
Wildcard rider
Replacement rider

- All entries used Dunlop tyres.

== Standings ==
=== MotoGP standings ===
Scoring system

Points were awarded to the top fifteen finishers. Rider had to finish the race to earn points.

Position	**1st**	**2nd**	**3rd**	**4th**	**5th**	**6th**	**7th**	**8th**	**9th**	**10th**	**11th**	**12th**	**13th**	**14th**	**15th**
Points	25	20	16	13	11	10	9	8	7	6	5	4	3	2	1

==== Riders' standings ====
- Rounds marked with a light blue background were under wet race conditions or stopped by rain.
- Riders marked with light blue background were eligible for Rookie of the Year awards.

Pos	Rider	Bike	Team	QAT (Qatar)	JPN (Japan)	SPA (Spain)	FRA (France)	ITA (Italy)	CAT (Catalonia)	NED (Netherlands)	USA (United States)	GER (Germany)	GBR (United Kingdom)	CZE (Czech Republic)	INP (Indianapolis)	RSM (San Marino)	POR (Portugal)	AUS (Australia)	MAL (Malaysia)	VAL (Valencian Community)	Pts
1	(Italy) Valentino Rossi	Yamaha	Fiat Yamaha Team	2	**2**	1	16	3	1	**1**	2	**1**	**5**	**1**	Ret	**1**	4	2	**3**	2	306
2	(Spain) Jorge Lorenzo	Yamaha	Fiat Yamaha Team	3	1	**Ret**	1	**2**	**2**	2	**3**	2	Ret	Ret	1	2	**1**	Ret	4	3	261
3	(Spain) Dani Pedrosa	Honda	Repsol Honda Team	11	3	2	**3**	Ret	6	Ret	1	3	9	2	**10**	3	3	3	2	1	234
4	(Australia) Casey Stoner	Ducati	Ducati Marlboro Team	**1**	4	3	5	1	3	3	4	4	14				2	**1**	1	**DNS**	220
5	(United States) Colin Edwards	Yamaha	Monster Yamaha Tech 3	4	12	7	7	6	7	4	7	9	2	7	5	Ret	5	5	13	4	161
6	(Italy) Andrea Dovizioso	Honda	Repsol Honda Team	5	5	8	4	4	4	Ret	Ret	Ret	1	4	4	4	7	6	Ret	8	160
7	(Spain) Toni Elías	Honda	San Carlo Honda Gresini	9	15	9	10	14	Ret	12	6	6	Ret	3	9	6	6	10	7	6	115
8	(San Marino) Alex de Angelis	Honda	San Carlo Honda Gresini	6	13	14	11	15	12	10	11	5	4	8	2	Ret	Ret	4	12	10	111
9	(Italy) Loris Capirossi	Suzuki	Rizla Suzuki MotoGP	Ret	7	6	8	5	5	9	Ret	11	11	5	7	5	Ret	12	9	14	110
10	(Italy) Marco Melandri	Kawasaki	Hayate Racing Team	14	6	5	2	11	14	11	10	7	7	Ret	Ret	8	12	7	8	17	108
11	(France) Randy de Puniet	Honda	LCR Honda MotoGP	10	11	4	14	8	8	7	9	Ret	3	10	12	12	11	8	Ret	11	106
12	(Australia) Chris Vermeulen	Suzuki	Rizla Suzuki MotoGP	7	10	10	6	10	11	5	8	13	13	11	11	9	10	11	6	15	106
13	(United States) Nicky Hayden	Ducati	Ducati Marlboro Team	12	Ret	15	12	12	10	8	5	8	15	6	3	Ret	8	15	5	5	104
14	(United Kingdom) James Toseland	Yamaha	Monster Yamaha Tech 3	16	9	13	9	7	13	6	DSQ	10	6	9	6	10	9	14	15	12	92
15	(Finland) Mika Kallio	Ducati	Pramac Racing	8	8	Ret	Ret	13	9	Ret		14	10				Ret	9	10	9	71
15	(Finland) Mika Kallio	Ducati	Ducati Marlboro Team											Ret	8	7					71
16	(Italy) Niccolò Canepa	Ducati	Pramac Racing	17	14	16	15	9	16	14	12	12	8	12	Ret	13	13	DNS			38
17	(Hungary) Gábor Talmácsi	Honda	Scot Racing Team MotoGP						17	16	Ret	15	12	13	14	14	14	13	14	16	19
18	(Spain) Aleix Espargaró	Ducati	Pramac Racing												13	11			11	13	16
19	(Spain) Sete Gibernau	Ducati	Grupo Francisco Hernando	13	Ret	11			15	13	Ret										12
20	(United States) Ben Spies	Yamaha	Sterilgarda Yamaha Team																	7	9
21	(Japan) Yuki Takahashi	Honda	Scot Racing Team MotoGP	15	Ret	12	13	Ret	Ret	15											9
	(Italy) Michel Fabrizio	Ducati	Pramac Racing											Ret							0
Pos	Rider	Bike	Team	QAT (Qatar)	JPN (Japan)	SPA (Spain)	FRA (France)	ITA (Italy)	CAT (Catalonia)	NED (Netherlands)	USA (United States)	GER (Germany)	GBR (United Kingdom)	CZE (Czech Republic)	INP (Indianapolis)	RSM (San Marino)	POR (Portugal)	AUS (Australia)	MAL (Malaysia)	VAL (Valencian Community)	Pts

Colour	Result
Gold	Winner
Silver	Second place
Bronze	Third place
Green	Points classification
Blue	Non-points classification
Blue	Non-classified finish (NC)
Purple	Retired, not classified (Ret)
Red	Did not qualify (DNQ)
Red	Did not pre-qualify (DNPQ)
Black	Disqualified (DSQ)
White	Did not start (DNS)
White	Withdrew (WD)
White	Race cancelled (C)
Blank	Did not practice (DNP)
Blank	Did not arrive (DNA)
Blank	Excluded (EX)

**Bold** – Pole position
Italics – Fastest lap

==== Constructors' standings ====
- Each constructor got the same number of points as their best placed rider in each race.
- Rounds marked with a light blue background were under wet race conditions or stopped by rain.

Pos	Constructor	QAT (Qatar)	JPN (Japan)	SPA (Spain)	FRA (France)	ITA (Italy)	CAT (Catalonia)	NED (Netherlands)	USA (United States)	GER (Germany)	GBR (United Kingdom)	CZE (Czech Republic)	INP (Indianapolis)	RSM (San Marino)	POR (Portugal)	AUS (Australia)	MAL (Malaysia)	VAL (Valencian Community)	Pts
1	(Japan) Yamaha	2	1	1	1	2	1	1	2	1	2	1	1	1	1	2	3	2	386
2	(Japan) Honda	5	3	2	3	4	4	7	1	3	1	2	2	3	3	3	2	1	297
3	(Italy) Ducati	1	4	3	5	1	3	3	4	4	8	6	3	7	2	1	1	5	272
4	(Japan) Suzuki	7	7	6	6	5	5	5	8	11	11	5	7	5	10	11	6	14	133^{†}
5	(Japan) Kawasaki	14	6	5	2	11	14	11	10	7	7	Ret	Ret	8	12	7	8	17	108
Pos	Constructor	QAT (Qatar)	JPN (Japan)	SPA (Spain)	FRA (France)	ITA (Italy)	CAT (Catalonia)	NED (Netherlands)	USA (United States)	GER (Germany)	GBR (United Kingdom)	CZE (Czech Republic)	INP (Indianapolis)	RSM (San Marino)	POR (Portugal)	AUS (Australia)	MAL (Malaysia)	VAL (Valencian Community)	Pts

† Following Loris Capirossi's engine change, Suzuki was given a ten-point penalty in the constructors' championship at the Australian Grand Prix because of the new for 2009 MotoGP engine change limit rule which restricts each rider to five engines for the final seven rounds.

==== Teams' standings ====
- Each team got the total points scored by their two riders, including replacement riders. In one rider team, only the points scored by that rider was counted. Wildcard riders did not score points.
- Rounds marked with a light blue background were under wet race conditions or stopped by rain.

Pos	Team	Bike No.	QAT (Qatar)	JPN (Japan)	SPA (Spain)	FRA (France)	ITA (Italy)	CAT (Catalonia)	NED (Netherlands)	USA (United States)	GER (Germany)	GBR (United Kingdom)	CZE (Czech Republic)	INP (Indianapolis)	RSM (San Marino)	POR (Portugal)	AUS (Australia)	MAL (Malaysia)	VAL (Valencian Community)	Pts
1	(Japan) Fiat Yamaha Team	46	2	**2**	1	16	3	1	**1**	2	**1**	**5**	**1**	Ret	**1**	4	2	**3**	2	567
1	(Japan) Fiat Yamaha Team	99	3	1	**Ret**	1	**2**	**2**	2	**3**	2	Ret	Ret	1	2	**1**	Ret	4	3	567
2	(Japan) Repsol Honda Team	3	11	3	2	**3**	Ret	6	Ret	1	3	9	2	**10**	3	3	3	2	1	394
2	(Japan) Repsol Honda Team	4	5	5	8	4	4	4	Ret	Ret	Ret	1	4	4	4	7	6	Ret	8	394
3	(Italy) Ducati Marlboro Team	27	**1**	4	3	5	1	3	3	4	4	14				2	**1**	1	**DNS**	341
3	(Italy) Ducati Marlboro Team	36											Ret	8	7					341
3	(Italy) Ducati Marlboro Team	69	12	Ret	15	12	12	10	8	5	8	15	6	3	Ret	8	15	5	5	341
4	(France) Monster Yamaha Tech 3	5	4	12	7	7	6	7	4	7	9	2	7	5	Ret	5	5	13	4	253
4	(France) Monster Yamaha Tech 3	52	16	9	13	9	7	13	6	DSQ	10	6	9	6	10	9	14	15	12	253
5	(Italy) San Carlo Honda Gresini	15	6	13	14	11	15	12	10	11	5	4	8	2	Ret	Ret	4	12	10	226
5	(Italy) San Carlo Honda Gresini	24	9	15	9	10	14	Ret	12	6	6	Ret	3	9	6	6	10	7	6	226
6	(Japan) Rizla Suzuki MotoGP	7	7	10	10	6	10	11	5	8	13	13	11	11	9	10	11	6	15	216
6	(Japan) Rizla Suzuki MotoGP	65	Ret	7	6	8	5	5	9	Ret	11	11	5	7	5	Ret	12	9	14	216
7	(Switzerland) Hayate Racing Team	33	14	6	5	2	11	14	11	10	7	7	Ret	Ret	8	12	7	8	17	108
8	(Italy) Pramac Racing	36	8	8	Ret	Ret	13	9	Ret		14	10				Ret	9	10	9	108
8	(Italy) Pramac Racing	44												13	11			11	13	108
8	(Italy) Pramac Racing	84											Ret							108
8	(Italy) Pramac Racing	88	17	14	16	15	9	16	14	12	12	8	12	Ret	13	13	DNS			108
9	(Monaco) LCR Honda MotoGP	14	10	11	4	14	8	8	7	9	Ret	3	10	12	12	11	8	Ret	11	106
10	(San Marino) Scot Racing Team MotoGP	41						17	16	Ret	15	12	13	14	14	14	13	14	16	28
10	(San Marino) Scot Racing Team MotoGP	72	15	Ret	12	13	Ret	Ret	15											28
11	(Spain) Grupo Francisco Hernando	59	13	Ret	11			15	13	Ret										12
Pos	Team	Bike No.	QAT (Qatar)	JPN (Japan)	SPA (Spain)	FRA (France)	ITA (Italy)	CAT (Catalonia)	NED (Netherlands)	USA (United States)	GER (Germany)	GBR (United Kingdom)	CZE (Czech Republic)	INP (Indianapolis)	RSM (San Marino)	POR (Portugal)	AUS (Australia)	MAL (Malaysia)	VAL (Valencian Community)	Pts

=== 250cc standings ===
Scoring system

Points were awarded to the top fifteen finishers. Rider had to finish the race to earn points.

Position	**1st**	**2nd**	**3rd**	**4th**	**5th**	**6th**	**7th**	**8th**	**9th**	**10th**	**11th**	**12th**	**13th**	**14th**	**15th**
Points	25	20	16	13	11	10	9	8	7	6	5	4	3	2	1

==== Riders' standings ====
- Rounds marked with a light blue background were under wet race conditions or stopped by rain.
- Riders marked with light blue background were eligible for Rookie of the Year awards.

Pos	Rider	Bike	QAT (Qatar)	JPN (Japan)	SPA (Spain)	FRA (France)	ITA (Italy)	CAT (Catalonia)	NED (Netherlands)	GER (Germany)	GBR (United Kingdom)	CZE (Czech Republic)	INP (Indianapolis)	RSM (San Marino)	POR (Portugal)	AUS (Australia)	MAL (Malaysia)	VAL (Valencian Community)	Pts
1	(Japan) Hiroshi Aoyama	Honda	4	2	1	8	6	2	1	4	1	4	2	**4**	4	7	**1**	7	261
2	(Spain) Héctor Barberá	Aprilia	1	11	4	11	5	**3**	**2**	5	**8**	7	6	1	**3**	2	2	1	239
3	(Italy) Marco Simoncelli	Gilera	DNS	**17**	3	1	2	Ret	3	**1**	4	**1**	1	Ret	1	1	3	Ret	231
4	(Spain) Álvaro Bautista	Aprilia	**7**	1	2	**4**	**3**	1	Ret	3	2	3	3	3	Ret	10	Ret	2	218
5	(Italy) Mattia Pasini	Aprilia	Ret	3	6	Ret	1	4	Ret	Ret	3	2	Ret	2	8	Ret	Ret	Ret	128
6	(Italy) Raffaele De Rosa	Honda	5	12	10	6	9	9	10	9	7	6	11	8	Ret	**3**	Ret	3	122
7	(Switzerland) Thomas Lüthi	Aprilia	6	8	5	Ret	4	6	Ret	8	9	Ret	9	10	7	11	4	4	120
8	(France) Mike Di Meglio	Aprilia	3	Ret	11	Ret	12	14	11	Ret	5	9	**4**	5	2	5	Ret	14	107
9	(Spain) Héctor Faubel	Honda	11	Ret	14	2	8	10	8	6	10	10	8	9	Ret	8	5	Ret	105
10	(Spain) Alex Debón	Aprilia	14	5	**Ret**	Ret	7	5	6	2	6	Ret	Ret	7	9	13	7	**DNS**	101
11	(Italy) Roberto Locatelli	Gilera	9	Ret	9	3	10	Ret	5	10	13	5	5	Ret	Ret	NC	Ret	9	85
12	(France) Jules Cluzel	Aprilia	2	Ret	8	DNS	Ret	11	Ret	14	11	8	Ret	6	5	4	Ret	Ret	82
13	(Thailand) Ratthapark Wilairot	Honda	8	Ret	15	5	14	7	9	DNS	Ret	11	Ret	Ret	6	9	6	5	82
14	(Czech Republic) Karel Abraham	Aprilia	Ret	9	Ret	12	13	8	7	Ret	14	Ret	10	11	10	6	12	6	74
15	(Czech Republic) Lukáš Pešek	Aprilia	13	7	13	7	Ret	12	12	12	12	12	7	Ret	11	12	8	12	74
16	(Italy) Alex Baldolini	Aprilia	15	Ret	Ret	Ret	11	13	13	11	16	Ret	12	13	14	Ret	9	8	41
17	(Japan) Shoya Tomizawa	Honda	12	10	12	Ret	Ret	Ret	Ret	13	15	13	DNS	12	Ret	15	16	10	32
18	(Hungary) Gábor Talmácsi	Aprilia	10	4	7														28
19	(Japan) Shuhei Aoyama	Honda		6											12	14	10	11	27
20	(Spain) Aleix Espargaró	Aprilia							4	7									22
21	(France) Valentin Debise	Honda			20	13	19	17	14	20	19	15	13	14	13	19	13	15	18
22	(Hungary) Imre Tóth	Aprilia	17	13	16	9	15	Ret	15	18	17	17	17	18	18	18	Ret	19	12
23	(Hungary) Balázs Németh	Aprilia					16	18			Ret	14	16	15	16	16	11	13	11
24	(Russia) Vladimir Leonov	Aprilia	18	15	19	10	Ret	20	16	Ret		19	15	17	Ret	Ret	15	17	9
25	(Switzerland) Bastien Chesaux	Honda	16	16	17	Ret	18	19	Ret	15	22	Ret	Ret	Ret					3
25	(Switzerland) Bastien Chesaux	Aprilia													17	17	14	16	3
26	(Spain) Axel Pons	Aprilia	Ret	Ret	Ret	Ret	17	16	Ret	16	20	16	14	16	15	Ret	Ret	Ret	3
27	(United Kingdom) Toby Markham	Honda			DNQ	14		21	Ret										2
27	(United Kingdom) Toby Markham	Aprilia								17	23	Ret		Ret					2
28	(Japan) Kazuki Watanabe	Yamaha		14															2
29	(United States) Stevie Bonsey	Aprilia						15	Ret										1
	(Spain) Aitor Rodríguez	Aprilia	19	18	18	Ret					21	18		19					0
	(Republic of Ireland) William Dunlop	Honda																18	0
	(United States) Barrett Long	Yamaha											18						0
	(United Kingdom) Luke Mossey	Aprilia									18								0
	(Italy) Christopher Moretti	Aprilia													19				0
	(Canada) Adam Roberts	Yamaha											19						0
	(Sweden) Joakim Stensmö	Honda								19									0
	(Spain) Daniel Arcas	Aprilia					20												0
	(Spain) Iván Maestro	Aprilia			Ret														0
	(Spain) Ángel Rodríguez	Aprilia				Ret													0
	(Germany) Ralf Waldmann	Aprilia									Ret								0
	(Germany) Marcel Becker	Yamaha								DNQ									0
	(Sweden) Robin Halen	Aprilia							DNQ	DNQ									0
	(United Kingdom) Alex Kenchington	Aprilia									DNQ								0
Pos	Rider	Bike	QAT (Qatar)	JPN (Japan)	SPA (Spain)	FRA (France)	ITA (Italy)	CAT (Catalonia)	NED (Netherlands)	GER (Germany)	GBR (United Kingdom)	CZE (Czech Republic)	INP (Indianapolis)	RSM (San Marino)	POR (Portugal)	AUS (Australia)	MAL (Malaysia)	VAL (Valencian Community)	Pts

Colour	Result
Gold	Winner
Silver	Second place
Bronze	Third place
Green	Points classification
Blue	Non-points classification
Blue	Non-classified finish (NC)
Purple	Retired, not classified (Ret)
Red	Did not qualify (DNQ)
Red	Did not pre-qualify (DNPQ)
Black	Disqualified (DSQ)
White	Did not start (DNS)
White	Withdrew (WD)
White	Race cancelled (C)
Blank	Did not practice (DNP)
Blank	Did not arrive (DNA)
Blank	Excluded (EX)

**Bold** – Pole position
Italics – Fastest lap

==== Constructors' standings ====
- Each constructor got the same number of points as their best placed rider in each race.
- Rounds marked with a light blue background were under wet race conditions or stopped by rain.

Pos	Constructor	QAT (Qatar)	JPN (Japan)	SPA (Spain)	FRA (France)	ITA (Italy)	CAT (Catalonia)	NED (Netherlands)	GER (Germany)	GBR (United Kingdom)	CZE (Czech Republic)	INP (Indianapolis)	RSM (San Marino)	POR (Portugal)	AUS (Australia)	MAL (Malaysia)	VAL (Valencian Community)	Pts
1	(Italy) Aprilia	1	1	2	4	1	1	2	2	2	2	3	1	2	2	2	1	339
2	(Japan) Honda	4	2	1	2	6	2	1	4	1	4	2	4	4	3	1	3	287
3	(Italy) Gilera	9	17	3	1	2	Ret	3	1	4	1	1	Ret	1	1	3	9	245
4	(Japan) Yamaha		14						DNQ	DNQ		18						2
Pos	Constructor	QAT (Qatar)	JPN (Japan)	SPA (Spain)	FRA (France)	ITA (Italy)	CAT (Catalonia)	NED (Netherlands)	GER (Germany)	GBR (United Kingdom)	CZE (Czech Republic)	INP (Indianapolis)	RSM (San Marino)	POR (Portugal)	AUS (Australia)	MAL (Malaysia)	VAL (Valencian Community)	Pts

=== 125cc standings ===
Scoring system

Points were awarded to the top fifteen finishers. Rider had to finish the race to earn points.

Position	**1st**	**2nd**	**3rd**	**4th**	**5th**	**6th**	**7th**	**8th**	**9th**	**10th**	**11th**	**12th**	**13th**	**14th**	**15th**
Points	25	20	16	13	11	10	9	8	7	6	5	4	3	2	1

==== Riders' standings ====
- Rounds marked with a light blue background were under wet race conditions or stopped by rain.
- Riders marked with light blue background were eligible for Rookie of the Year awards.

Pos	Rider	Bike	QAT^{†} (Qatar)	JPN (Japan)	SPA (Spain)	FRA (France)	ITA (Italy)	CAT (Catalonia)	NED (Netherlands)	GER (Germany)	GBR (United Kingdom)	CZE (Czech Republic)	INP (Indianapolis)	RSM (San Marino)	POR (Portugal)	AUS (Australia)	MAL (Malaysia)	VAL (Valencian Community)	Pts
1	(Spain) Julián Simón	Aprilia	**2**	2	**Ret**	1	3	**4**	2	**1**	1	2	**5**	1	**12**	1	1	**1**	289
2	(United Kingdom) Bradley Smith	Aprilia	5	10	1	4	**1**	8	3	Ret	**20**	4	2	**3**	3	2	2	2	223.5
3	(Spain) Nicolás Terol	Aprilia	7	17	10	9	2	2	5	4	4	1	4	2	Ret	6	5	10	179.5
4	(Spain) Pol Espargaró	Derbi	4	3	7	Ret	4	Ret	9	5	10	5	1	Ret	1	**4**	3	3	174.5
5	(Spain) Sergio Gadea	Aprilia	12	19	2	3	11	3	1	2	Ret	9	15	Ret	6	10	4	16	141
6	(Germany) Sandro Cortese	Derbi	3	6	6	12	10	9	**Ret**	6	Ret	6	18	5	2	3	6	8	130
7	(Italy) Andrea Iannone	Aprilia	1	**1**	19	7	Ret	1	4	7	Ret	**3**	Ret	Ret	Ret	8	8	Ret	125.5
8	(Spain) Marc Márquez	KTM	Ret	5	3	**Ret**	5	5	10	16	15	8	6	4	Ret	9	**Ret**	17	94
9	(Spain) Joan Olivé	Derbi	18	7	11	Ret	Ret	14	11	3	12	10	8	8	5	Ret	9	6	91
10	(Germany) Stefan Bradl	Aprilia	8	4	Ret	Ret	8	7	6	Ret	Ret	7	7	6	4	Ret	Ret	Ret	85
11	(Italy) Simone Corsi	Aprilia	14	15	14	Ret	18	16	8	Ret	2	Ret	3	7	Ret	5	Ret	4	81
12	(Germany) Jonas Folger	Aprilia	6	8	Ret	2	14	6	7	Ret	Ret	12	12	9	14	14	Ret	Ret	73
13	(Switzerland) Dominique Aegerter	Derbi	11	9	9	6	19	20	13	9	8	18	10	15	8	12	14	11	70.5
14	(Spain) Efrén Vázquez	Derbi	17	22	5	8	Ret	Ret	12	17	9	14	21	12	Ret	7	Ret	7	54
15	(United Kingdom) Scott Redding	Aprilia	13	Ret	4	Ret	7	11	Ret	Ret	3	15	Ret	Ret	16	11	Ret	Ret	50.5
16	(Japan) Takaaki Nakagami	Aprilia	20	20	16	5	15	15	17	Ret	5	19	9	20	11	18	11	14	43
17	(United Kingdom) Danny Webb	Aprilia	9	11	8	Ret	Ret	Ret	Ret	8	Ret	16	11	10	Ret	13	Ret	DNS	38.5
18	(Spain) Esteve Rabat	Aprilia	10	13	12	11	16	12	Ret	Ret	Ret	Ret	20	Ret	7	Ret	7	Ret	37
19	(Italy) Lorenzo Zanetti	Aprilia	19	14	18	10	12	Ret	15	Ret	7	Ret	17	14	13	17	10	12	37
20	(France) Johann Zarco	Aprilia	15	Ret	13	Ret	6	13	21	23	13	11	23	16	9	16	Ret	15	32.5
21	(Switzerland) Randy Krummenacher	Aprilia	22	18	17	15	13	10	Ret	11	18	17	Ret	17	10	15	13	9	32
22	(Spain) Luis Salom	Honda			21			Ret											21
22	(Spain) Luis Salom	Aprilia							16	13	6	Ret	13	21	15	19	15	13	21
23	(Germany) Marcel Schrötter	Honda								12		13						5	18
24	(Japan) Tomoyoshi Koyama	Loncin	27	12	Ret	Ret	Ret	17	Ret	10	11	21	14	Ret	Ret	21	Ret	20	17
25	(Austria) Michael Ranseder	Haojue	Ret	DNS	DNS	DNQ													9
25	(Austria) Michael Ranseder	Aprilia								Ret	Ret	20	16	11	Ret	20	12	Ret	9
26	(Italy) Lorenzo Savadori	Aprilia	21	Ret	21	Ret	9	Ret	Ret	20	Ret	Ret	Ret	Ret				Ret	7
27	(Italy) Riccardo Moretti	Aprilia					20							13					3
28	(Netherlands) Jasper Iwema	Honda	23	Ret	24	13	23	21	19	19	Ret	Ret		23	17	22	18	18	3
29	(United States) Cameron Beaubier	KTM	16	16	15	Ret	DNQ	18	Ret	14	Ret	DNS	19	22	Ret	Ret	17	Ret	3
30	(United Kingdom) Martin Glossop	Honda									14								2
31	(Germany) Marvin Fritz	Honda							14										2
32	(France) Grégory Di Carlo	Honda				14													2
33	(Germany) Daniel Kartheininger	Honda								15									1
	(Republic of Ireland) Paul Jordan	Honda									16								0
	(Malaysia) Elly Ilias	Aprilia															16		0
	(Czech Republic) Lukáš Šembera	Aprilia	25	23	20	Ret	22	Ret	20	18	17	30	22						0
	(Italy) Luigi Morciano	Aprilia					17					22		19					0
	(Spain) Alberto Moncayo	Aprilia			22			19							18			19	0
	(Netherlands) Michael van der Mark	Honda							18										0
	(Italy) Luca Marconi	Aprilia	24	25	25	Ret	Ret	24	23	24	19	26	24	24	Ret	26	Ret	21	0
	(Norway) Sturla Fagerhaug	KTM				Ret		22							19			Ret	0
	(Czech Republic) Jakub Kornfeil	Loncin												28	25	23	19	Ret	0
	(Spain) Johnny Rosell	Aprilia						23							20				0
	(Malaysia) Muhammad Zulfahmi	Yamaha															20		0
	(Italy) Luca Vitali	Aprilia	28	26	DSQ	Ret	25	26	25	DNQ	21	25	25	27	22	25	Ret	Ret	0
	(France) Alexis Masbou	Loncin	26	21	Ret	Ret	Ret	Ret	Ret	Ret	Ret	24	Ret						0
	(Slovakia) Jakub Jantulík	Aprilia												26	21				0
	(Italy) Davide Stirpe	Honda					21												0
	(Germany) Toni Finsterbusch	Honda								21									0
	(Australia) Blake Leigh-Smith	Honda															21		0
	(France) Quentin Jacquet	Aprilia													23	DNS	22	DNQ	0
	(Czech Republic) Karel Pešek	Derbi							22		Ret	27							0
	(Switzerland) Damien Raemy	Honda								22									0
	(Italy) Alessandro Tonucci	Aprilia					26					23		29					0
	(Spain) Jordi Dalmau	Honda			27			25							24				0
	(Japan) Yuuichi Yanagisawa	Honda		24															0
	(Australia) Brad Gross	Yamaha														24			0
	(Italy) Gennaro Sabatino	Aprilia					24												0
	(Netherlands) Pepijn Bijsterbosch	Honda							24										0
	(Italy) Gabriele Ferro	Aprilia												25					0
	(Spain) Borja Maestro	Aprilia			26														0
	(Japan) Hiroomi Iwata	Honda		27															0
	(Australia) Andrew Lawson	Honda														27			0
	(Japan) Satoru Kamada	Honda		28															0
	(Australia) Levi Day	Honda														28			0
	(Spain) Eduard López	Aprilia			28														0
	(Croatia) Ivan Višak	Honda										28							0
	(Japan) Yuki Oogane	Honda		29															0
	(Czech Republic) Ladislav Chmelík	Honda										29							0
	(France) Cyril Carrillo	Honda				Ret													0
	(Australia) Nicky Diles	Aprilia														Ret			0
	(United Kingdom) Timothy Hastings	Honda									Ret								0
	(Finland) Eeki Kuparinen	Honda								Ret									0
	(France) Steven Le Coquen	Honda				Ret													0
	(United Kingdom) James Lodge	Honda									Ret								0
	(Spain) Iván Maestro	Aprilia																Ret	0
	(United States) Miles Thornton	Aprilia											Ret						0
	(Japan) Yuma Yahagi	Honda		Ret															0
	(United States) Ben Young	Aprilia											Ret						0
	(United Kingdom) Matthew Hoyle	Haojue	DNS	DNQ	DNQ	DNQ													0
	(Australia) Dylan Mavin	Honda														DNS			0
	(Spain) Joan Perelló	Aprilia																DNS	0
	(France) Ornella Ongaro	Honda				DNQ													0
	(Netherlands) Roy Pouw	Aprilia							DNQ										0
Pos	Rider	Bike	QAT^{†} (Qatar)	JPN (Japan)	SPA (Spain)	FRA (France)	ITA (Italy)	CAT (Catalonia)	NED (Netherlands)	GER (Germany)	GBR (United Kingdom)	CZE (Czech Republic)	INP (Indianapolis)	RSM (San Marino)	POR (Portugal)	AUS (Australia)	MAL (Malaysia)	VAL (Valencian Community)	Pts

Colour	Result
Gold	Winner
Silver	Second place
Bronze	Third place
Green	Points classification
Blue	Non-points classification
Blue	Non-classified finish (NC)
Purple	Retired, not classified (Ret)
Red	Did not qualify (DNQ)
Red	Did not pre-qualify (DNPQ)
Black	Disqualified (DSQ)
White	Did not start (DNS)
White	Withdrew (WD)
White	Race cancelled (C)
Blank	Did not practice (DNP)
Blank	Did not arrive (DNA)
Blank	Excluded (EX)

**Bold** – Pole position
Italics – Fastest lap

† Half-points awarded in Qatar, as the riders did not complete the sufficient distance for full points.

==== Constructors' standings ====
- Each constructor got the same number of points as their best placed rider in each race.
- Rounds marked with a light blue background were under wet race conditions or stopped by rain.

Pos	Constructor	QAT^{†} (Qatar)	JPN (Japan)	SPA (Spain)	FRA (France)	ITA (Italy)	CAT (Catalonia)	NED (Netherlands)	GER (Germany)	GBR (United Kingdom)	CZE (Czech Republic)	INP (Indianapolis)	RSM (San Marino)	POR (Portugal)	AUS (Australia)	MAL (Malaysia)	VAL (Valencian Community)	Pts
1	(Italy) Aprilia	1	1	1	1	1	1	1	1	1	1	2	1	3	1	1	1	373.5
2	(Spain) Derbi	3	3	5	6	4	9	9	3	8	5	1	5	1	3	3	3	216
3	(Austria) KTM	16	5	3	Ret	5	5	10	14	16	8	6	4	19	9	17	17	96
4	(Japan) Honda	23	24	23	13	21	21	14	12	14	13		23	17	22	18	5	25
5	(China) Loncin	26	12	Ret	Ret	Ret	16	Ret	10	11	21	Ret	28	25	21	19	20	17
	(Japan) Yamaha														24	20		0
	(China) Haojue	Ret	DNS	DNS	DNQ													0
Pos	Constructor	QAT^{†} (Qatar)	JPN (Japan)	SPA (Spain)	FRA (France)	ITA (Italy)	CAT (Catalonia)	NED (Netherlands)	GER (Germany)	GBR (United Kingdom)	CZE (Czech Republic)	INP (Indianapolis)	RSM (San Marino)	POR (Portugal)	AUS (Australia)	MAL (Malaysia)	VAL (Valencian Community)	Pts

† Half-points awarded in Qatar, as the riders did not complete the sufficient distance for full points.

== Sources ==
- "The Official MotoGP website". Archived from the original on 2012-09-20.
