= Onde 2000 =

Motorcycle racing team based in Spain

- 2009 name: Grupo Francisco Hernando
- Base: Madrid, Spain
- Principal: Ángel Nieto Jr.
- Rider(s): 59 Sete Gibernau
- Motorcycle: Ducati Desmosedici GP9
- Tyres: Bridgestone

Onde 2000 is a motorcycle racing team previously competing in the 125 cc road racing Grand Prix world championship. The team withdrew from MotoGP after 8 races in the 2009 season due to financial difficulties.

In 2009, the team competed in 6 races under the name Grupo Francisco Hernando and using a Ducati Desmosedici motorcycle.

== History ==
=== 2008 ===
The team was officially launched early in 2008, running two bikes in the 125 cc Grand Prix category. The team entered two KTM motorcycles, ridden by Pablo Nieto and Raffaele de Rosa.

=== 2009 ===
Onde 2000 stepped up to the MotoGP class in 2009 with the Spanish rider Sete Gibernau riding a Ducati Desmosedici. however financial problems restricted them to 6 rounds ending with the United States Grand Prix with a best result of 11th at the Spanish Grand Prix.

== See also ==
- Aspar Team
