= Levi Day =

Australian motorcycle racer

- Nationality: Australian
- Born: 20 September 1989 (age 37); Mount Gambier, Australia
- Current team: Boast Plumbing
- Bike number: 57

Levi Day is a motorcycle racer from Australia. He is currently racing in the Ducati TriOptions Cup aboard a Ducati 959.

== Career statistics ==
2009- 6th, Australian 125 Championship #57 Honda RS125R
2010- Australian 125 Championship #57 Honda RS125R
2011- 14th, Australian Supersport Championship #57 Suzuki GSX-R600
2012- 6th, Australian Supersport Championship #57 Suzuki GSX-R600
2013- 9th, British National Superstock 600 Championship #57 Kawasaki ZX-6R
2014- 8th, British National Superstock 600 Championship #57 Kawasaki ZX-6R
2015- 20th, British Supersport Championship #57 Kawasaki ZX-6R
2016- 29th, British Supersport Championship #57 Kawasaki ZX-6R
2017- 3rd, Ducati TriOptions Cup #57 Ducati 848
2018- Ducati TirOptions Cup #57 Ducati 848

=== By season ===
Season	Class	Motorcycle	Team	Number	Race	Win	Podium	Pole	FLap	Pts	Plcd
2009	125cc	Honda	Racetrix / Angelo's Aluminum	98	1	0	0	0	0	0	NC
2010	125cc	Honda	Racetrix	47	0	0	0	0	0	0	NC
Total					**1**	**0**	**0**	**0**	**0**	**0**	

==== Races by year ====
Year	Class	Bike	1	2	3	4	5	6	7	8	9	10	11	12	13	14	15	16	17	Pos.	Pts
2009	125cc	Honda	QAT	JPN	SPA	FRA	ITA	CAT	NED	GER	GBR	CZE	INP	RSM	POR	AUS; 28	MAL	VAL		NC	0
2010	125cc	Honda	QAT	SPA	FRA	ITA	GBR	NED	CAT	GER	CZE	INP	RSM	ARA	JPN	MAL	AUS; DNQ	POR	VAL	NC	0

=== British Supersport Championship ===
(key) (Races in bold indicate pole position; races in italics indicate fastest lap)

Year	Bike	1	2	3	4	5	6	7	8	9	10	11	12	13	14	15	16	17	18	19	20	21	22	23	24	Pos	Pts
2015	Kawasaki	DON; 12	DON; 12	BRH; 15	BRH; 16	OUL; 13	OUL; 12	SNE; 11	SNE; 7	KNO; 10	KNO; 11	BRH; 15	BRH; Ret	THR	THR	CAD	CAD	OUL	OUL	ASS	ASS	SIL	SIL	BRH	BRH	20th	42
