= Satoru Kamada =

Japanese motorcycle racer

- Nationality: Japanese
- Born: 11 January 1984 (age 42); Iwate, Japan
Motorcycle racing career statistics
125cc World Championship
| Active years | 2009 |
| Manufacturers | Honda |
Starts / Wins / Podiums / Poles / F. laps / Points; 1 / 0 / 0 / 0 / 0 / 0

Satoru Kamada (鎌田 悟, Kamada Satoru; born 11 January 1984) is a Japanese motorcycle racer.

== Career statistics ==
=== Grand Prix motorcycle racing ===
==== By season ====
| Season | Class | Motorcycle | Team | Number | Race | Win | Podium | Pole | FLap | Pts | Plcd |
|---|---|---|---|---|---|---|---|---|---|---|---|
| 2009 | 125cc | Honda | Endurance & Osl | 59 | 1 | 0 | 0 | 0 | 0 | 0 | NC |
| Total | | | | | 1 | 0 | 0 | 0 | 0 | 0 | |

==== Races by year ====
(key)

| Year | Class | Bike | 1 | 2 | 3 | 4 | 5 | 6 | 7 | 8 | 9 | 10 | 11 | 12 | 13 | 14 | 15 | 16 | Pos. | Pts |
|---|---|---|---|---|---|---|---|---|---|---|---|---|---|---|---|---|---|---|---|---|
| 2009 | 125cc | Honda | QAT | JPN; 28 | SPA | FRA | ITA | CAT | NED | GER | GBR | CZE | INP | RSM | POR | AUS | MAL | VAL | NC | 0 |
