= Yuma Yahagi =

Japanese motorcycle racer

- Nationality: Japanese
- Born: 26 July 1990 (age 36); Tokyo, Japan
Motorcycle racing career statistics
125cc World Championship
Active years	2009–2010
Manufacturers	Honda
Starts / Wins / Podiums / Poles / F. laps / Points; 2 / 0 / 0 / 0 / 0 / 0

Yuma Yahagi (Japanese: 矢作 雄馬, Hepburn: Yahagi Yūma; born 26 July 1990) is a Japanese former motorcycle racer. He has competed in the All Japan Road Race Championship, in the GP125, J-GP3 and ST600 classes. Aged 18, he made his Grand Prix debut in the 2009 Japanese motorcycle Grand Prix as a wildcard entry in the 125cc class. In 2025, he was convicted of robbery and sentenced to eight years in prison.

== Personal life ==
In 2024, Yahagi was arrested and indicted for allegedly acting as a perpetrator in a robbery in Saitama. On 8 January 2025, he was arrested again by the Saitama Prefectural Police on suspicion of fraud involving 1.2 million yen. On 21 October 2025, he was sentenced to eight years in prison for robbery.

== Career statistics ==
=== Grand Prix motorcycle racing ===
==== By season ====
Season	Class	Motorcycle	Team	Race	Win	Podium	Pole	FLap	Pts	Plcd
2009	125cc	Honda	Okegawajuku & Endurance	1	0	0	0	0	0	NC
2010	125cc	Honda	Endurance	1	0	0	0	0	0	NC
Total				2	0	0	0	0	0	

==== Races by year ====
(key)

Year	Class	Bike	1	2	3	4	5	6	7	8	9	10	11	12	13	14	15	16	17	Pos.	Pts
2009	125cc	Honda	QAT	JPN; Ret	SPA	FRA	ITA	CAT	NED	GER	GBR	CZE	INP	RSM	POR	AUS	MAL	VAL		NC	0
2010	125cc	Honda	QAT	SPA	FRA	ITA	GBR	NED	CAT	GER	CZE	INP	RSM	ARA	JPN; 24	MAL	AUS	POR	VAL	NC	0
