= Adam Roberts (motorcyclist) =

Canadian motorcycle racer

- Nationality: Canada
- Born: 28 December 1984 (age 41); Canada
- Current team: Unsigned
- Bike number: -

Adam Roberts (born December 28, 1984) is a Canadian Grand Prix motorcycle racer.

== Career statistics ==
=== By season ===
Season	Class	Motorcycle	Team	Number	Race	Win	Podium	Pole	FLap	Pts	Plcd
2009	250cc	Yamaha	Rat Racing	30	1	0	0	0	0	0	NC
Total					1	0	0	0	0	0	

=== Races by year ===
Year	Class	Bike	1	2	3	4	5	6	7	8	9	10	11	12	13	14	15	16	Pos	Points
2009	250cc	Yamaha	QAT	JPN	SPA	FRA	ITA	CAT	NED	GER	GBR	CZE	INP; 19	RSM	POR	AUS	MAL	VAL	NC	0
