= Chmel =

Chmel (feminine: Chmelová) is a Czech and Slovak surname. It is derived from the word chmel (i.e. 'hops') and it denoted someone who grew, traded or processed hops, or someone who enjoyed beer. A similar surname with the same etymology is Chmelík. Notable people with the surname include:

- Clementine Krauss (married Chmel; 1877–1938), Austrian ballerina, actress and opera singer
- Rudolf Chmel (born 1939), Slovak politician
- Klára Chmelová (born 1995), Czech ice hockey player
