= Yuuichi Yanagisawa =

Japanese motorcycle racer

- Nationality: Japanese
- Born: 19 August 1984 (age 42); Chiba, Japan
Motorcycle racing career statistics
125cc World Championship
Active years	2007–2009
Manufacturers	Honda
Starts / Wins / Podiums / Poles / F. laps / Points; 3 / 0 / 0 / 0 / 0 / 0

Yuuichi Yanagisawa (柳沢 祐一, Yanagisawa Yūichi; born 19 August 1984) is a Japanese motorcycle racer.

== Career statistics ==
=== Grand Prix motorcycle racing ===
==== By season ====
Season	Class	Motorcycle	Team	Number	Race	Win	Podium	Pole	FLap	Pts	Plcd
2007	125cc	Honda	Mettalico 18 Garage	57	1	0	0	0	0	0	NC
2008	125cc	Honda	18 Garage Racing	58	1	0	0	0	0	0	NC
2009	125cc	Honda	18 Garage Racing	58	1	0	0	0	0	0	NC
Total					3	0	0	0	0	0	

==== Races by year ====
(key)

Year	Class	Bike	1	2	3	4	5	6	7	8	9	10	11	12	13	14	15	16	17	Pos.	Pts
2007	125cc	Honda	QAT	SPA	TUR	CHN	FRA	ITA	CAT	GBR	NED	GER	CZE	RSM	POR	JPN; Ret	AUS	MAL	VAL	NC	0
2008	125cc	Honda	QAT	SPA	POR	CHN	FRA	ITA	CAT	GBR	NED	GER	CZE	RSM	INP	JPN; 22	AUS	MAL	VAL	NC	0
2009	125cc	Honda	QAT	JPN; 24	SPA	FRA	ITA	CAT	NED	GER	GBR	CZE	INP	RSM	POR	AUS	MAL	VAL		NC	0
