= Karel Pešek (motorcyclist) =

Czech motorcycle racer (born 1992)

- Nationality: Czech
- Born: 2 August 1992 (age 34); Prague, Czechoslovakia
- Current team: Moto82
- Bike number: 82
Motorcycle racing career statistics
125cc World Championship
Active years	2007–2009
Manufacturers	Aprilia, Derbi
Championships	0
2009 championship position	NC (0 pts)
Starts / Wins / Podiums / Poles / F. laps / Points; 6 / 0 / 0 / 0 / 0 / 0
Superbike World Championship
Active years	2016
Manufacturers	Yamaha
Championships	0
2016 championship position	NC (0 pts)
Starts / Wins / Podiums / Poles / F. laps / Points; 2 / 0 / 0 / 0 / 0 / 0

Karel Pešek (born 2 August 1992) is a Czech motorcycle racer. He races in the Alpe Adria Road Racing Superstock 1000 Championship aboard a Kawasaki ZX-10R. He has previously competed in the Alpe Adria Superstock 600 Championship, the FIM Superstock 1000 Championship and the European Superstock 600 Championship. He won the Czech 125cc Championship in 2008 and the Czech Superstock 600 Championship in 2011. His brother, Lukáš Pešek, is also a motorcycle racer.

== Career statistics ==
2009 - NC, European Superstock 600 Championship, Honda CBR600RR
2010 - 37th, European Superstock 600 Championship, Yamaha YZF-R6
2013 - NC, FIM Superstock 1000 Cup, BMW S1000RR, Ducati 1098
2014 - NC, FIM Superstock 1000 Cup, Ducati 1098

=== Grand Prix motorcycle racing ===
==== By season ====
Season	Class	Motorcycle	Team	Race	Win	Podium	Pole	FLap	Pts	Plcd
2007	125cc	Aprilia	Intermoto Czech	1	0	0	0	0	0	NC
2008	125cc	Aprilia	Czech Road Racing JNR. Team	2	0	0	0	0	0	NC
2009	125cc	Derbi	Pesek Team	3	0	0	0	0	0	NC
Total				**6**	**0**	**0**	**0**	**0**	**0**	

==== Races by year ====
(key) (Races in bold indicate pole position; races in italics indicate fastest lap)

Year	Class	Bike	1	2	3	4	5	6	7	8	9	10	11	12	13	14	15	16	17	Pos	Pts
2007	125cc	Aprilia	QAT	SPA	TUR	CHN	FRA	ITA	CAT	GBR	NED	GER	CZE; 31	RSM	POR	JPN	AUS	MAL	VAL	NC	0
2008	125cc	Aprilia	QAT	SPA	POR; 28	CHN	FRA	ITA	CAT	GBR	NED	GER	CZE; Ret	RSM	INP	JPN	AUS	MAL	VAL	NC	0
2009	125cc	Derbi	QAT	JPN	SPA	FRA	ITA	CAT	NED; 22	GER	GBR; Ret	CZE; 27	INP	RSM	POR	AUS	MAL	VAL		NC	0

=== European Superstock 600 ===
==== Races by year ====
(key) (Races in bold indicate pole position, races in italics indicate fastest lap)

Year	Bike	1	2	3	4	5	6	7	8	9	10	Pos	Pts
2009	Honda	VAL	ASS	MNZ	MIS	SIL	BRN	NÜR	IMO	MAG	POR; 21	NC	0
2010	Yamaha	POR	VAL; Ret	ASS; 16	MNZ; WD	MIS; 13	BRN; DNS	SIL	NÜR	IMO	MAG	37th	3

=== Superstock 1000 Cup ===
==== Races by year ====
(key) (Races in bold indicate pole position) (Races in italics indicate fastest lap)

Year	Bike	1	2	3	4	5	6	7	8	9	10	Pos	Pts
2013	BMW/Ducati	ARA	NED	MNZ	ALG	IMO	SIL	SIL	NŰR; 24	MAG	JER; 22	NC	0
2014	Ducati	ARA; 17	NED; DNS	IMO	MIS	ALG	JER	MAG	NC	0			

=== Superbike World Championship ===
==== Races by year ====
(key) (Races in bold indicate pole position; races in italics indicate fastest lap)

Year	Bike	1		2		3		4		5		6		7		8		9		10		11		12		13		Pos	Pts
Year	Bike	R1	R2	R1	R2	R1	R2	R1	R2	R1	R2	R1	R2	R1	R2	R1	R2	R1	R2	R1	R2	R1	R2	R1	R2	R1	R2	Pos	Pts
2016	Yamaha	AUS	AUS	THA	THA	SPA	SPA	NED	NED	ITA	ITA	MAL	MAL	GBR	GBR	ITA	ITA	USA	USA	GER	GER	FRA	FRA	SPA; 18	SPA; 19	QAT	QAT	NC	0
