= 2009 United States motorcycle Grand Prix =

2009 United States Grand Prix
Race details
- Race 7 of 17 races in the 2009 Grand Prix motorcycle racing season
- Date: July 5, 2009
- Official name: Red Bull U.S. Grand Prix
- Location: Mazda Raceway Laguna Seca
- Course: Permanent racing facility; 3.610 km (2.243 mi)

MotoGP
Pole position
- Rider: (Spain) Jorge Lorenzo
- Time: 1:21.678
Fastest lap
- Rider: (Spain) Dani Pedrosa
- Time: 1:21.928
Podium
- First: (Spain) Dani Pedrosa
- Second: (Italy) Valentino Rossi
- Third: (Spain) Jorge Lorenzo

The 2009 United States motorcycle Grand Prix was the eighth round of the 2009 Grand Prix motorcycle racing season. It took place on the weekend of July 3–5, 2009 at Mazda Raceway Laguna Seca. As usual, only the MotoGP class was permitted to race at Laguna Seca due to the Californian air pollution law prohibiting two-stroke engines in the state. Spain's Dani Pedrosa took his first win for a year, holding off a last-lap surge from championship leader Valentino Rossi.

== MotoGP classification ==
Pos.	No.	Rider	Team	Manufacturer	Laps	Time/Retired	Grid	Points
1	3	(Spain) Dani Pedrosa	Repsol Honda Team	Honda	32	44:01.580	4	25
2	46	(Italy) Valentino Rossi	Fiat Yamaha Team	Yamaha	32	+0.344	2	20
3	99	(Spain) Jorge Lorenzo	Fiat Yamaha Team	Yamaha	32	+1.926	1	16
4	27	(Australia) Casey Stoner	Ducati Team	Ducati	32	+12.432	3	13
5	69	(United States) Nicky Hayden	Ducati Team	Ducati	32	+21.663	8	11
6	24	(Spain) Toni Elías	San Carlo Honda Gresini	Honda	32	+22.041	6	10
7	5	(United States) Colin Edwards	Monster Yamaha Tech 3	Yamaha	32	+30.201	7	9
8	7	(Australia) Chris Vermeulen	Rizla Suzuki MotoGP	Suzuki	32	+32.857	9	8
9	14	(France) Randy de Puniet	LCR Honda MotoGP	Honda	32	+40.325	14	7
10	33	(Italy) Marco Melandri	Hayate Racing Team	Kawasaki	32	+48.028	11	6
11	15	(San Marino) Alex de Angelis	San Carlo Honda Gresini	Honda	32	+48.810	12	5
12	88	(Italy) Niccolò Canepa	Pramac Racing	Ducati	32	+1:18.531	16	4
Ret	4	(Italy) Andrea Dovizioso	Repsol Honda Team	Honda	6	Accident	5	
Ret	59	(Spain) Sete Gibernau	Grupo Francisco Hernando	Ducati	6	Accident	13	
Ret	65	(Italy) Loris Capirossi	Rizla Suzuki MotoGP	Suzuki	3	Accident	10	
Ret	41	(Hungary) Gábor Talmácsi	Scot Racing Team MotoGP	Honda	3	Accident	17	
DSQ	52	(United Kingdom) James Toseland	Monster Yamaha Tech 3	Yamaha	10	Ignored ride through penalty	15	

== Championship standings after the race (MotoGP) ==
Below are the standings for the top five riders and constructors after round eight has concluded.

Riders' Championship standings

Pos.	Rider	Points
1	(Italy) Valentino Rossi	151
2	(Spain) Jorge Lorenzo	142
3	(Australia) Casey Stoner	135
4	(Spain) Dani Pedrosa	92
5	(United States) Colin Edwards	76

Constructors' Championship standings

Pos.	Constructor	Points
1	(Japan) Yamaha	185
2	(Italy) Ducati	135
3	(Japan) Honda	123
4	(Japan) Suzuki	79
5	(Japan) Kawasaki	61

- Note: Only the top five positions are included for both sets of standings.

Previous race: 2009 Dutch TT	FIM Grand Prix World Championship; 2009 season	Next race: 2009 German Grand Prix
Previous race: 2008 United States Grand Prix	United States motorcycle Grand Prix	Next race: 2010 United States Grand Prix
