= Grégory Di Carlo =

French motorcycle racer

- Nationality: French
- Born: 13 May 1993 (age 33); Lisses, France
- Website: gregdicarlo.com

Grégory Di Carlo is a Grand Prix motorcycle racer from France. He crashed in the 2011 European 600 Superstock Championship and broke his wrist, ending the season for him. He faced a few challenges coming back in the next year.

== Grand Prix motorcycle racing ==
=== By season ===
Season	Class	Motorcycle	Team	Number	Race	Win	Podium	Pole	FLap	Pts	Plcd
2009	125cc	Honda	Equipe de France	48	1	0	0	0	0	2	32nd
2010	125cc	Honda	Équipe de France Vitesse Espoir	81	1	0	0	0	0	0	NC
Total					2	0	0	0	0	2	

=== Races by year ===
Year	Class	Bike	1	2	3	4	5	6	7	8	9	10	11	12	13	14	15	16	17	Pos	Points
2009	125cc	Honda	QAT	JPN	SPA	FRA; 14	ITA	CAT	NED	GER	GBR	CZE	INP	RSM	POR	AUS	MAL	VAL		32nd	2
2010	125cc	Honda	QAT	SPA	FRA; 24	ITA	GBR	NED	CAT	GER	CZE	INP	RSM	ARA	JPN	MAL	AUS	POR	VAL	NC	0

== European Superstock 600 ==
=== Races by year ===
(key) (Races in bold indicate pole position, races in italics indicate fastest lap)

Year	Bike	1	2	3	4	5	6	7	8	9	10	Pos	Pts
2011	Yamaha	ASS	MNZ	MIS	ARA	BRN	SIL	NÜR	IMO	MAG; 9	POR; Ret	31st	7
