= Brad Gross (motorcyclist) =

Australian motorcycle racer

- Nationality: Australian
- Born: 29 October 1990 (age 36); Brisbane, Australia

Brad Gross (born 29 October 1990) is a Grand Prix motorcycle racer from Australia.

== Career statistics ==
=== By season ===
Season	Class	Motorcycle	Race	Win	Podium	Pole	FLap	Pts	Plcd
2008	125cc	Yamaha	1	0	0	0	0	0	NC
2009	125cc	Yamaha	1	0	0	0	0	0	NC
Total			2	0	0	0	0	0	

=== Races by year ===
Year	Class	Bike	1	2	3	4	5	6	7	8	9	10	11	12	13	14	15	16	17	Pos	Points
2008	125cc	Yamaha	QAT	SPA	POR	CHN	FRA	ITA	CAT	GBR	NED	GER	CZE	RSM	INP	JPN	AUS; Ret	MAL	VAL	NC	0
2009	125cc	Yamaha	QAT	JPN	SPA	FRA	ITA	CAT	NED	GER	GBR	CZE	INP	RSM	POR	AUS; 24	MAL	VAL		NC	0
