= Damien Raemy =

Swiss motorcycle racer (born 1994)

- Nationality: Swiss
- Born: 6 April 1994 (age 32); Wünnewil-Flamatt, Switzerland
- Current team: Hess Racing Team
- Bike number: 94
- Website: www.damien-raemy.com

Damien Raemy (born 6 April 1994) is a Grand Prix motorcycle racer from Switzerland. He currently races in the IDM Supersport 600 Championship aboard a Yamaha R6.

== Career statistics ==
=== FIM CEV Moto2 European Championship ===
==== Races by year ====
(key) (Races in bold indicate pole position) (Races in italics indicate fastest lap)

Year	Bike	1	2	3	4	5	6	7	8	9	10	11	Pos	Pts
2015	Suter	ALG1; 33	ALG2; 28	CAT; Ret	ARA1; 24	ARA2; 24	ALB	NAV1	NAV2	JER	VAL1	VAL2	NC	0

=== Grand Prix motorcycle racing ===
==== By season ====
Season	Class	Motorcycle	Team	Number	Race	Win	Podium	Pole	FLap	Pts	Plcd
2009	125cc	Honda	RBS - Honda Racing	80	1	0	0	0	0	0	NC
2011	125cc	KTM	Caretta Technology	90	1	0	0	0	0	0	NC
Total					**2**	**0**	**0**	**0**	**0**	**0**	

==== Races by year ====
Year	Class	Bike	1	2	3	4	5	6	7	8	9	10	11	12	13	14	15	16	17	Pos	Points
2009	125cc	Honda	QAT	JPN	SPA	FRA	ITA	CAT	NED	GER; 22	GBR	CZE	INP	RSM	POR	AUS	MAL	VAL		22	0
2011	125cc	KTM	QAT	SPA	POR	FRA	CAT	GBR	NED	ITA	GER	CZE	INP	RSM	ARA; 19	JPN	AUS	MAL	VAL	19	0
