= Chmelík =

- Municipality
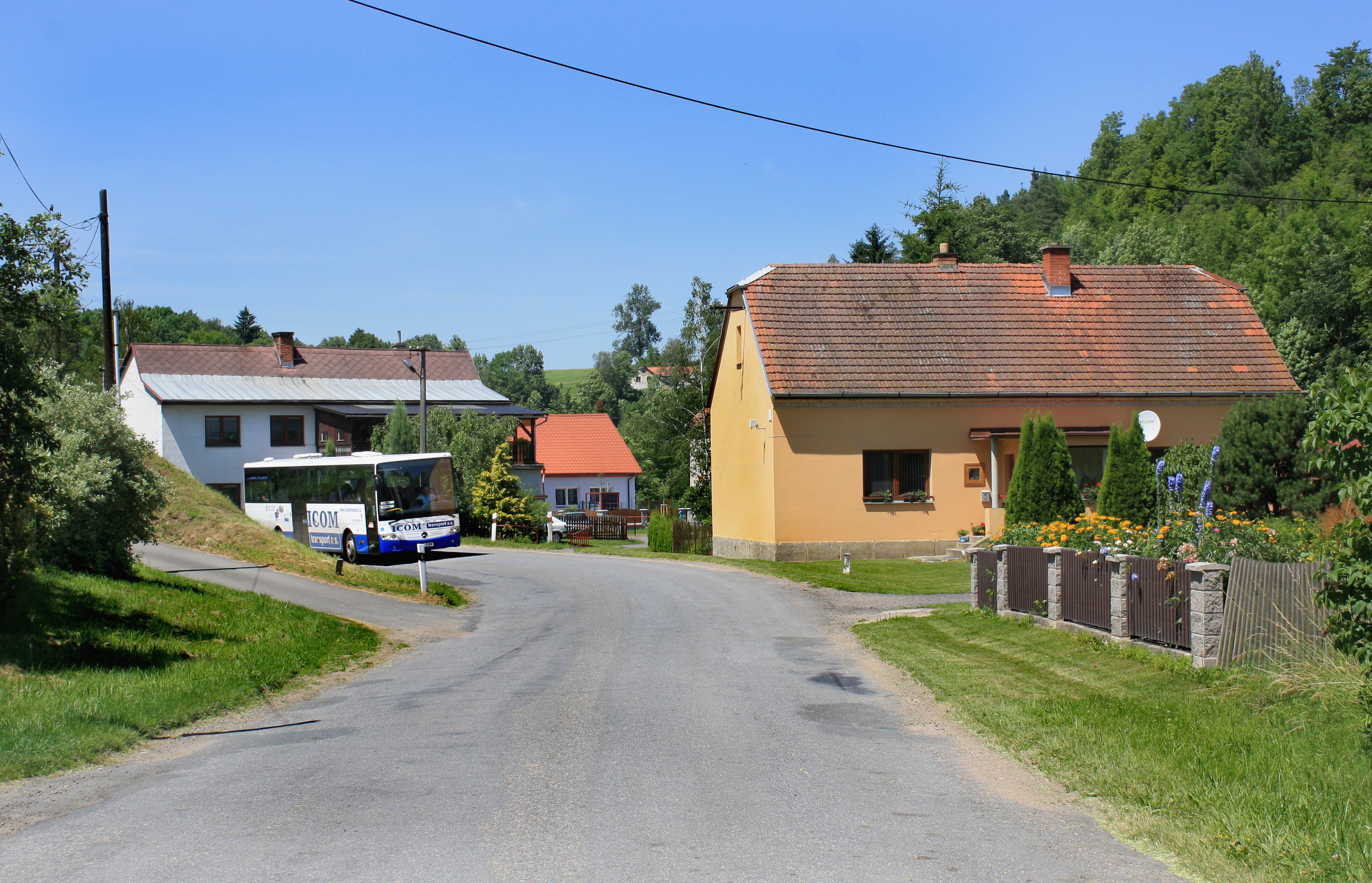
- Main street

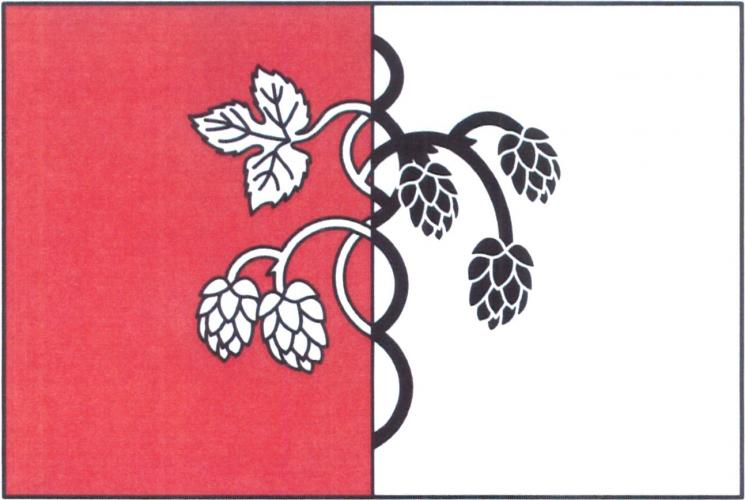
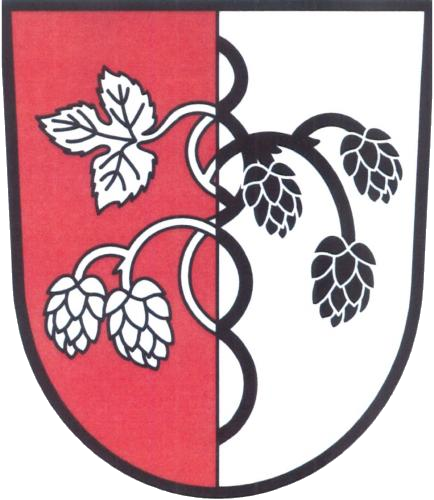
- Flag Coat of arms

- Location in the Czech Republic
- Coordinates: 49°46′24″N 16°19′58″E
- Country: Czech Republic
- Region: Pardubice
- District: Svitavy
- First mentioned: 1314

Area
  - Total: 9.54 km^{2} (3.68 sq mi)
- Elevation: 442 m (1,450 ft)

Population (2026-01-01)
  - Total: 199
  - Density: 20.9/km^{2} (54.0/sq mi)
- Time zone: UTC+1 (CET)
  - Summer (DST): UTC+2 (CEST)
- Postal code: 570 01
- Website: www.obecchmelik.cz

Chmelík is a municipality and village in Svitavy District in the Pardubice Region of the Czech Republic. It has about 200 inhabitants.

Chmelík lies approximately 11 kilometres (7 mi) west of Svitavy, 50 km (31 mi) south-east of Pardubice, and 142 km (88 mi) east of Prague.

== Demographics ==
Historical population
Year	Pop.	±%
1869	472	—
1880	493	+4.4%
1890	481	−2.4%
1900	525	+9.1%
1910	495	−5.7%
1921	478	−3.4%
1930	471	−1.5%
1950	239	−49.3%
1961	240	+0.4%
1970	231	−3.7%
1980	213	−7.8%
1991	194	−8.9%
2001	211	+8.8%
2011	173	−18.0%
2021	172	−0.6%
Source: Censuses
