= Elly Ilias =

Malaysian motorcycle racer (1984–2024)

- Nationality: Malaysian
- Born: Elly Idzlianizar bin Elias; 20 January 1984; Perlis, Malaysia
- Died: 11 September 2024 (aged 40); Perlis, Malaysia
- Current team: Harian Metro Y-TEQ Honda Racing
- Bike number: 16

Elly Idzlianizar bin Elias also known as Elly Ilias (20 January 1984 - 11 September 2024) was a Grand Prix motorcycle racer from Malaysia. He competed in the Malaysian Cub Prix CP130 Championship.

== Career ==
He competed in multiple levels in the Malaysian Cub Prix. He dropped from CP130 to CP115 in 2013, returned to CP130 in 2015.

== Personal life ==
Ilias was murdered by samurai sword in 2024.
