= Johnny Rosell =

Spanish motorcycle racer

Johnny Rosell Trallero
- Nationality: Spanish
- Born: 18 October 1992 (age 34); Barcelona, Spain

Johnny Rosell Trallero is a Grand Prix motorcycle racer from Spain.

== Career statistics ==
=== By season ===
Season	Class	Motorcycle	Team	Number	Race	Win	Podium	Pole	FLap	Pts	Plcd
2009	125cc	Aprilia	Blusens BQR	43	2	0	0	0	0	0	NC
2010	125cc	Honda	SAG Castrol	59	3	0	0	0	0	0	NC
Total					5	0	0	0	0	0	

==== Races by year ====
(key)

Year	Class	Bike	1	2	3	4	5	6	7	8	9	10	11	12	13	14	15	16	17	Pos.	Pts
2009	125cc	Aprilia	QAT	JPN	SPA	FRA	ITA	CAT; 23	NED	GER	GBR	CZE	INP	RSM	POR; 20	AUS	MAL	VAL		NC	0
2010	125cc	Honda	QAT	SPA; 19	FRA	ITA	GBR	NED	CAT; 21	GER	CZE	INP	RSM	ARA	JPN	MAL	AUS	POR	VAL; Ret	NC	0
