= Luigi Morciano =

Italian motorcycle racer

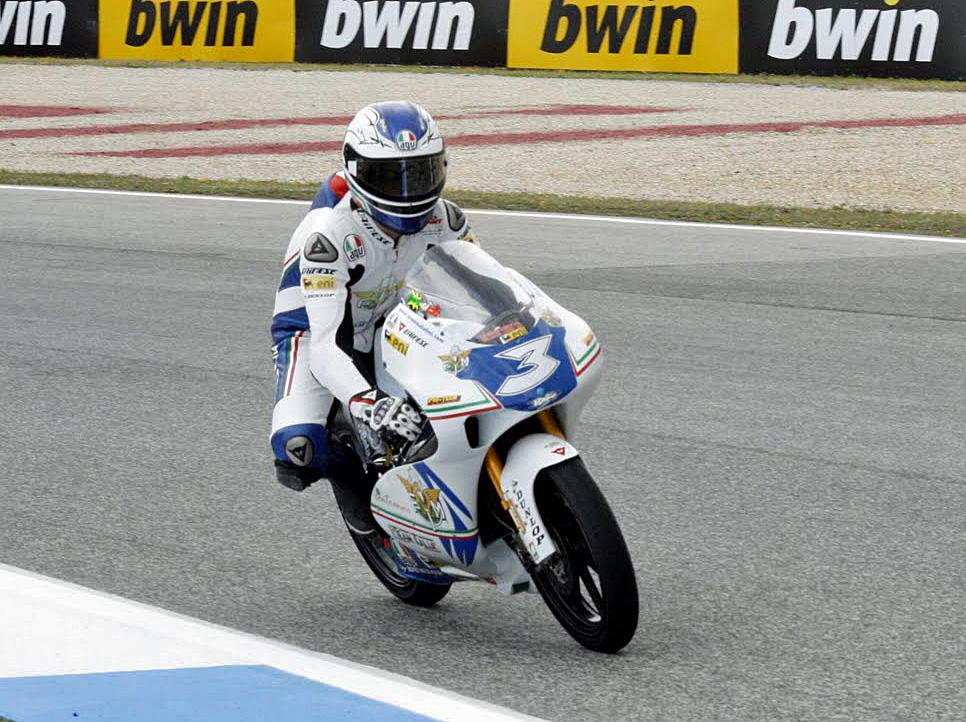
- Morciano at the 2011 Portuguese Grand Prix
- Nationality: Italian
- Born: 25 February 1994 (age 32); Anzio, Italy
- Current team: Technobike Squadra Corse
- Bike number: 100
Motorcycle racing career statistics
Moto3 World Championship
| Active years | 2012 |
| Manufacturers | Ioda |
| Championships | 0 |
| 2012 championship position | NC (0 pts) |
Starts / Wins / Podiums / Poles / F. laps / Points; 13 / 0 / 0 / 0 / 0 / 0
125cc World Championship
| Active years | 2009–2011 |
| Manufacturers | Aprilia |
| Championships | 0 |
| 2011 championship position | 20th (23 pts) |
Starts / Wins / Podiums / Poles / F. laps / Points; 22 / 0 / 0 / 0 / 0 / 25
Supersport World Championship
| Active years | 2015–2016, 2018 |
| Manufacturers | Honda, Kawasaki |
| Championships | 0 |
| 2018 championship position | NC (0 pts) |
Starts / Wins / Podiums / Poles / F. laps / Points; 4 / 0 / 0 / 0 / 0 / 5

Luigi Morciano (born 25 February 1994) is an Italian motorcycle racer. In the 2012 Moto3 Grand Prix, he competed for the Ioda Team Italia. He also competed in the CIV Supersport Championship aboard a Kawasaki ZX-6R.

== Career statistics ==
=== FIM CEV Moto3 Championship ===
==== Races by year ====
(key) (Races in bold indicate pole position; races in italics indicate fastest lap)

| Year | Bike | 1 | 2 | 3 | 4 | 5 | 6 | 7 | 8 | 9 | Pos | Pts |
|---|---|---|---|---|---|---|---|---|---|---|---|---|
| 2013 | KTM | CAT1; Ret | CAT2; Ret | ARA; 7 | ALB1 | ALB2; 11 | NAV; 20 | VAL1; 21 | VAL1; 26 | JER | 21st | 14 |

=== Grand Prix motorcycle racing ===
==== By season ====
| Season | Class | Motorcycle | Team | Race | Win | Podium | Pole | FLap | Pts | Plcd |
|---|---|---|---|---|---|---|---|---|---|---|
| 2009 | 125cc | Aprilia | Junior GP Racing Dream | 3 | 0 | 0 | 0 | 0 | 0 | NC |
| 2010 | 125cc | Aprilia | Junior GP Racing Dream FMI | 3 | 0 | 0 | 0 | 0 | 2 | 27th |
| 2011 | 125cc | Aprilia | Team Italia FMI | 16 | 0 | 0 | 0 | 0 | 23 | 20th |
| 2012 | Moto3 | Ioda | Ioda Team Italia | 13 | 0 | 0 | 0 | 0 | 0 | NC |
| Total | | | | **35** | **0** | **0** | **0** | **0** | **25** | |

==== Races by year ====
(key)

| Year | Class | Bike | 1 | 2 | 3 | 4 | 5 | 6 | 7 | 8 | 9 | 10 | 11 | 12 | 13 | 14 | 15 | 16 | 17 | Pos. | Pts |
|---|---|---|---|---|---|---|---|---|---|---|---|---|---|---|---|---|---|---|---|---|---|
| 2009 | 125cc | Aprilia | QAT | JPN | SPA | FRA | ITA; 17 | CAT | NED | GER | GBR | CZE; 22 | INP | RSM; 19 | POR | AUS | MAL | VAL | | NC | 0 |
| 2010 | 125cc | Aprilia | QAT | SPA | FRA | ITA; Ret | GBR | NED | CAT | GER | CZE; Ret | INP | RSM | ARA | JPN | MAL | AUS | POR; 14 | VAL | 2 | 27th |
| 2011 | 125cc | Aprilia | QAT; 20 | SPA; 20 | POR; 21 | FRA; 20 | CAT; 18 | GBR; DNS | NED; 17 | ITA; Ret | GER; 19 | CZE; 11 | INP; 15 | RSM; 14 | ARA; 12 | JPN; Ret | AUS; 12 | MAL; Ret | VAL; 9 | 23 | 20th |
| 2012 | Moto3 | Ioda | QAT; Ret | SPA; Ret | POR; 24 | FRA; Ret | CAT; 26 | GBR; 25 | NED; 28 | GER; 22 | ITA; 27 | INP; Ret | CZE; 27 | RSM; 21 | ARA; DNS | JPN | MAL | AUS | VAL; Ret | NC | 0 |

=== Supersport World Championship ===
==== Races by year ====
(key)

| Year | Bike | 1 | 2 | 3 | 4 | 5 | 6 | 7 | 8 | 9 | 10 | 11 | 12 | Pos. | Pts |
|---|---|---|---|---|---|---|---|---|---|---|---|---|---|---|---|
| 2015 | Honda | AUS | THA | SPA; 15 | NED; 15 | ITA | GBR | POR | ITA | MAL | SPA | FRA | QAT | 33rd | 2 |
| 2016 | Kawasaki | AUS | THA | SPA | NED | ITA | MAL | GBR | ITA; 13 | GER | FRA | SPA | QAT | 35th | 3 |
| 2018 | Kawasaki | AUS | THA | SPA | NED | ITA | GBR | CZE; 22 | ITA | POR | FRA | ARG | QAT | NC | 0 |
