= Borja Maestro =

Spanish motorcycle racer

- Nationality: Spanish
- Born: 4 September 1991 (age 35); Brunete, Spain
Motorcycle racing career statistics
125cc World Championship
Active years	2009
Manufacturers	Aprilia
Starts / Wins / Podiums / Poles / F. laps / Points; 1 / 0 / 0 / 0 / 0 / 0

Borja Maestro Martínez (born 4 September 1991) is a Spanish motorcycle racer. His brother, Iván Maestro, is also a motorcycle racer.

== Career statistics ==
=== Grand Prix motorcycle racer ===
==== By season ====
Season	Class	Motorcycle	Team	Race	Win	Podium	Pole	FLap	Pts	Plcd
2009	125cc	Aprilia	Hune Racing Team–TMM	1	0	0	0	0	0	NC
Total				1	0	0	0	0	0	

==== Races by year ====
Year	Class	Bike	1	2	3	4	5	6	7	8	9	10	11	12	13	14	15	16	Pos.	Points
2009	125cc	Aprilia	QAT	JPN	SPA; 26	FRA	ITA	CAT	NED	GER	GBR	CZE	INP	RSM	POR	AUS	MAL	VAL	NC	0
