= Iván Maestro =

Spanish motorcycle racer

- Nationality: Spanish
- Born: 17 December 1988 (age 37); Madrid, Spain
Motorcycle racing career statistics
250cc World Championship
Active years	2009
Manufacturers	Aprilia
Starts / Wins / Podiums / Poles / F. laps / Points; 1 / 0 / 0 / 0 / 0 / 0
125cc World Championship
Active years	2006–2009
Manufacturers	Honda, Aprilia
Starts / Wins / Podiums / Poles / F. laps / Points; 8 / 0 / 0 / 0 / 0 / 0

Iván Maestro Martínez (born 17 December 1988) is a Spanish motorcycle racer. His brother, Borja Maestro, is also a motorcycle racer.

== Career statistics ==
=== Grand Prix motorcycle racing ===
==== By season ====
Season	Class	Motorcycle	Team	Race	Win	Podium	Pole	FLap	Pts	Plcd
2006	125cc	Honda	Lambea TMM Racing	1	0	0	0	0	0	NC
2007	125cc	Aprilia	Matteoni Racing – TMM; AV – Matteoni Racing	3	0	0	0	0	0	NC
2007	125cc	Aprilia	Ascat. Madrid Team	3	0	0	0	0	0	NC
2008	125cc	Honda	Alpo Atlético de Madrid	3	0	0	0	0	0	NC
2008	125cc	Aprilia	Hune Matteoni	3	0	0	0	0	0	NC
2009	250cc	Aprilia	Milar – Juegos Lucky	1	0	0	0	0	0	NC
2009	125cc	Aprilia	Hune Racing Team–RZT	1	0	0	0	0	0	NC
Total				9	0	0	0	0	0	

=== Races by year ===
Year	Class	Bike	1	2	3	4	5	6	7	8	9	10	11	12	13	14	15	16	17	Pos.	Points
2006	125cc	Honda	SPA; Ret	QAT	TUR	CHN	FRA	ITA	CAT; DNQ	NED	GBR	GER	CZE	MAL	AUS	JPN	POR	VAL		NC	0
2007	125cc	Aprilia	QAT	SPA; 22	TUR	CHN	FRA	ITA	CAT; 27	GBR	NED	GER	CZE	RSM	POR	JPN	AUS	MAL	VAL; Ret	NC	0
2008	125cc	Honda	QAT	SPA; 22																NC	0
2008	125cc	Aprilia			POR; 27	CHN	FRA	ITA	CAT; Ret	GBR	NED	GER	CZE	RSM	INP	JPN	AUS	MAL	VAL	NC	0
2009	250cc	Aprilia	QAT	JPN	SPA; Ret	FRA	ITA	CAT	NED	GER	GBR	CZE	INP	RSM	POR	AUS	MAL			NC	0
2009	125cc	Aprilia																VAL; Ret		NC	0
