= Roy Pouw =

Dutch motorcycle racer

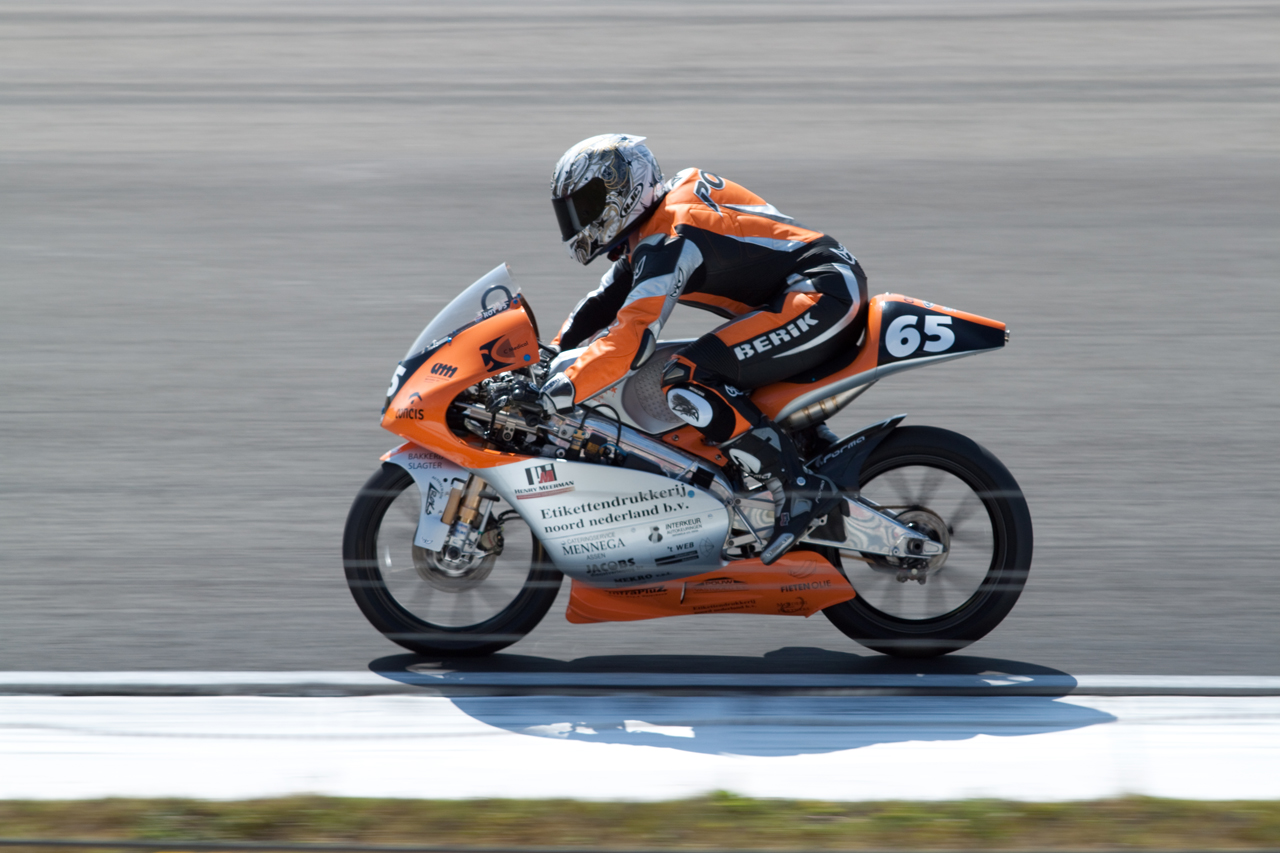
- Pouw at the 2010 Dutch TT
- Nationality: Dutch
- Born: 7 June 1992 (age 34); Kerkenveld, Netherlands
Motorcycle racing career statistics
125cc World Championship
Active years	2007, 2009–2010
Manufacturers	Aprilia
Starts / Wins / Podiums / Poles / F. laps / Points; 2 / 0 / 0 / 0 / 0 / 0

Roy Pouw (born 7 June 1992) is a Dutch motorcycle racer. He won the Dutch 125cc Championship in 2010.

== Career statistics ==
=== Grand Prix motorcycle racing ===
==== By season ====
Season	Class	Motorcycle	Team	Race	Win	Podium	Pole	FLap	Pts	Plcd
2007	125cc	Aprilia	Cool Rental Racing TH	1	0	0	0	0	0	NC
2009	125cc	Aprilia	Team Holland	0	0	0	0	0	0	NC
2010	125cc	Aprilia	Team Holland Mototechnic	1	0	0	0	0	0	NC
Total				2	0	0	0	0	0	

==== Races by year ====
(key)

Year	Class	Bike	1	2	3	4	5	6	7	8	9	10	11	12	13	14	15	16	17	Pos.	Pts
2007	125cc	Aprilia	QAT	SPA	TUR	CHN	FRA	ITA	CAT	GBR	NED; 30	GER	CZE	RSM	POR	JPN	AUS	MAL	VAL	NC	0
2009	125cc	Aprilia	QAT	JPN	SPA	FRA	ITA	CAT	NED; DNQ	GER	GBR	CZE	INP	RSM	POR	AUS	MAL	VAL		NC	0
2010	125cc	Aprilia	QAT	SPA	FRA	ITA	GBR	NED; Ret	CAT	GER	CZE	INP	RSM	ARA	JPN	MAL	AUS	POR	VAL	NC	0
