= Ladislav Chmelík =

Czech motorcycle racer

- Nationality: Czech
- Born: Czech Republic
- Current team: DRT Racing Team
- Bike number: 13

Ladislav Chmelík is a Czech Grand Prix motorcycle racer. He is currently competing in the Superstock 600 FIM Europe Championship for DRT Racing Team aboard a Yamaha YZF-R6.

== Career statistics ==
=== By season ===
Season	Class	Motorcycle	Team	Number	Race	Win	Podium	Pole	FLap	Pts	Plcd
2009	125cc	Honda	Moto FGR	67	1	0	0	0	0	0	NC
2010	125cc	Honda	Moto FGR	48	1	0	0	0	0	0	NC
2011	125cc	Aprilia	RJR Racing	24	1	0	0	0	0	0	NC
Total					3	0	0	0	0	0	

=== Races by year ===
Year	Class	Bike	1	2	3	4	5	6	7	8	9	10	11	12	13	14	15	16	17	Pos	Points
2009	125cc	Honda	QAT	JPN	SPA	FRA	ITA	CAT	NED	GER	GBR	CZE; 29	INP	RSM	POR	AUS	MAL	VAL		NC	0
2010	125cc	Honda	QAT	SPA	FRA	ITA	GBR	NED	CAT	GER	CZE; Ret	INP	RSM	ARA	JPN	MAL	AUS	POR	VAL	NC	0
2011	125cc	Aprilia	QAT	SPA	POR	FRA	CAT	GBR	NED	ITA	GER	CZE; 25	INP	RSM	ARA	JPN	AUS	MAL	VAL	NC	0
