= Matthew Hoyle =

British motorcycle racer

- Nationality: British
- Born: 26 April 1991 (age 35); Bradford, United Kingdom
Motorcycle racing career statistics
125cc World Championship
Active years	2008–2009
Manufacturers	Honda, Haojue
Starts / Wins / Podiums / Poles / F. laps / Points; 1 / 0 / 0 / 0 / 0 / 0

Matthew Hoyle (born 26 April 1991) is a British motorcycle racer who has competed in the Red Bull MotoGP Rookies Cup and the 125cc World Championship. He won the British 125cc Championship in 2008.

== Career statistics ==
=== Red Bull MotoGP Rookies Cup ===
==== Races by year ====
(key) (Races in bold indicate pole position, races in italics indicate fastest lap)

Year	1	2	3	4	5	6	7	8	9	10	Pos	Pts
2007	ESP; 16	ITA; 4	GBR; 3	NED; 7	GER; 6	CZE; 2	POR; 3	VAL; 5			3rd	95
2008	ESP1; Ret	ESP2; 14	POR; DNS	FRA; 15	ITA; 10	GBR	NED; 3	GER; 3	CZE1; 3	CZE2; 2	7th	77

=== British 125cc Championship ===
(key) (Races in bold indicate pole position, races in italics indicate fastest lap)

Year	Bike	1	2	3	4	5	6	7	8	9	10	11	12	Pos	Pts
2009	Honda	BHI	OUL	DON	THR	SNE	KNO	MAL	BHGP; 11	CAD	CRO; 4	SIL; 6	OUL; Ret	**17th**	**28**

=== Grand Prix motorcycle racing ===
==== By season ====
Season	Class	Motorcycle	Team	Number	Race	Win	Podium	Pole	FLap	Pts	Plcd
2008	125cc	Honda	SP 125 Racing/Mackory Demolition	64	1	0	0	0	0	0	NC
2009	125cc	Haojue	Haojue Team	66	0	0	0	0	0	0	NC
Total					**1**	**0**	**0**	**0**	**0**	**0**	

==== Races by year ====
(key)

Year	Class	Bike	1	2	3	4	5	6	7	8	9	10	11	12	13	14	15	16	17	Pos.	Pts
2008	125cc	Honda	QAT	SPA	POR	CHN	FRA	ITA	CAT	GBR; Ret	NED	GER	CZE	RSM	INP	JPN	AUS	MAL	VAL	NC	0
2009	125cc	Haojue	QAT; DNS	JPN; DNQ	SPA; DNQ	FRA; DNQ	ITA	CAT	NED	GER	GBR	CZE	INP	RSM	POR	AUS	MAL	VAL		NC	0

=== British Supersport Championship ===
(key) (Races in bold indicate pole position, races in italics indicate fastest lap)

Year	Bike	1	2	3	4	5	6	7	8	9	10	11	12	Pos	Pts
2010	Kawasaki	BHI	THR	OUL	CAD; 25	MAL; 20	KNO; 25	SNE; 19	BHGP; 15	CAD; 20	CRO; 16	SIL; DSQ	OUL; 15	34th	2
