= Robert Gull =

Swedish motorcycle racer (born 1991)

- Nationality: Swedish
- Born: 12 January 1991 (age 35); Stockholm, Sweden
- Website: gull-racing.se
Motorcycle racing career statistics
125cc World Championship
Active years	2008
Manufacturers	Derbi
Starts / Wins / Podiums / Poles / F. laps / Points; 1 / 0 / 0 / 0 / 0 / 0

Robert Gull (born 12 January 1991) is a Swedish motorcycle racer. He won the 125cc Swedish Championship in 2007 and 2008 and he has also competed in the 2007 Red Bull MotoGP Rookies Cup season and in a 2008 125cc World Championship race. Gull held the Guinness World Record for the fastest motorcycle wheelie on ice from 16 March 2014 to 31 January 2015 and achieved it again on 28 February 2015.

== Career statistics ==
=== Red Bull MotoGP Rookies Cup ===
==== Races by year ====
(key) (Races in bold indicate pole position, races in italics indicate fastest lap)

Year	1	2	3	4	5	6	7	8	Pos	Pts
2007	SPA; 4	ITA; 12	GBR; 17	NED; Ret	GER; 3	CZE; 7	POR; 6	VAL; Ret	9th	52

=== Grand Prix motorcycle racing ===
==== By season ====
Season	Class	Motorcycle	Team	Number	Race	Win	Podium	Pole	FLap	Pts	Plcd
2008	125cc	Derbi	Ajo Motorsports Jnr. Project	84	1	0	0	0	0	0	NC
Total					**1**	**0**	**0**	**0**	**0**	**0**	

==== Races by year ====
(key)

Year	Class	Bike	1	2	3	4	5	6	7	8	9	10	11	12	13	14	15	16	17	Pos.	Pts
2008	125cc	Derbi	QAT	SPA	POR	CHN	FRA	ITA	CAT	GBR	NED; 27	GER	CZE	RSM	INP	JPN	AUS	MAL	VAL	NC	0
