= Lorenzo Savadori =

Italian motorcycle racer

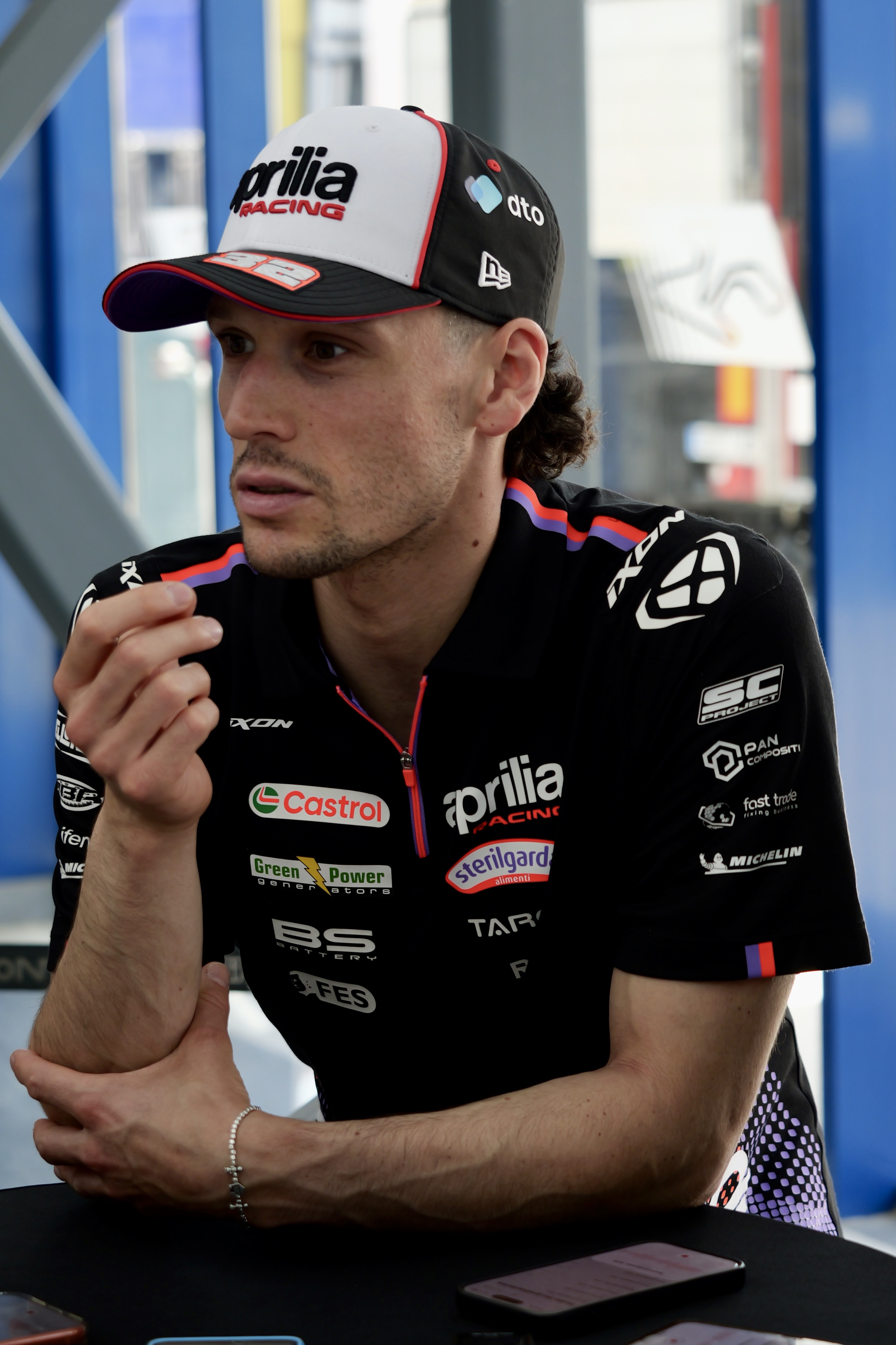
- Savadori at the 2026 Spanish Grand Prix
- Nationality: Italian
- Born: 4 April 1993 (age 33); Cesena, Italy
- Current team: Aprilia Racing (test rider)
- Bike number: 32
Motorcycle racing career statistics
MotoGP World Championship
Active years	2020–2026
Manufacturers	Aprilia
Championships	0
2025 championship position	24th (8 pts)
Starts / Wins / Podiums / Poles / F. laps / Points; 44 / 0 / 0 / 0 / 0 / 24
125cc World Championship
Active years	2008–2010
Manufacturers	Aprilia
Championships	0
2010 championship position	23rd (5 pts)
Starts / Wins / Podiums / Poles / F. laps / Points; 30 / 0 / 0 / 0 / 0 / 15
MotoE World Championship
Active years	2019
Manufacturers	Energica
Championships	0
2019 championship position	16th (24 pts)
Starts / Wins / Podiums / Poles / F. laps / Points; 6 / 0 / 0 / 0 / 0 / 24
Superbike World Championship
Active years	2013, 2016–2018
Manufacturers	Kawasaki, Aprilia
Championships	0
2018 championship position	10th (138 pts)
Starts / Wins / Podiums / Poles / F. laps / Points; 74 / 0 / 0 / 0 / 0 / 412

Lorenzo Savadori (born 4 April 1993 in Cesena) is a motorcycle racer from Italy, He was the 2015 FIM Superstock 1000 Cup winner and the Italia 2020 CIV Superbike Champion, acting as test rider for Aprilia with occasional wild card race entries. For the 2021 season, he competed in the MotoGP class of racing for Aprilia Racing as team-mate to Aleix Espargaró.

== Career ==
After finishing runner-up in the 2007 Red Bull MotoGP Rookies Cup, in 2008 he won the Italian 125GP championship and the European 125cc Championship. He debuted in the 125cc World Championship; he raced in the latter class for the following two seasons before switching, in 2011, to the FIM Superstock 1000 Cup, where he was champion in 2015. From 2016 to 2018, he rode for Aprilia in the Superbike World Championship with a best finish of tenth place. In 2019, he rode for Gresini Racing in the MotoE World Cup aboard an Energica Ego Corsa. In 2020, he won the CIV Superbike championship.

=== MotoGP World Championship ===
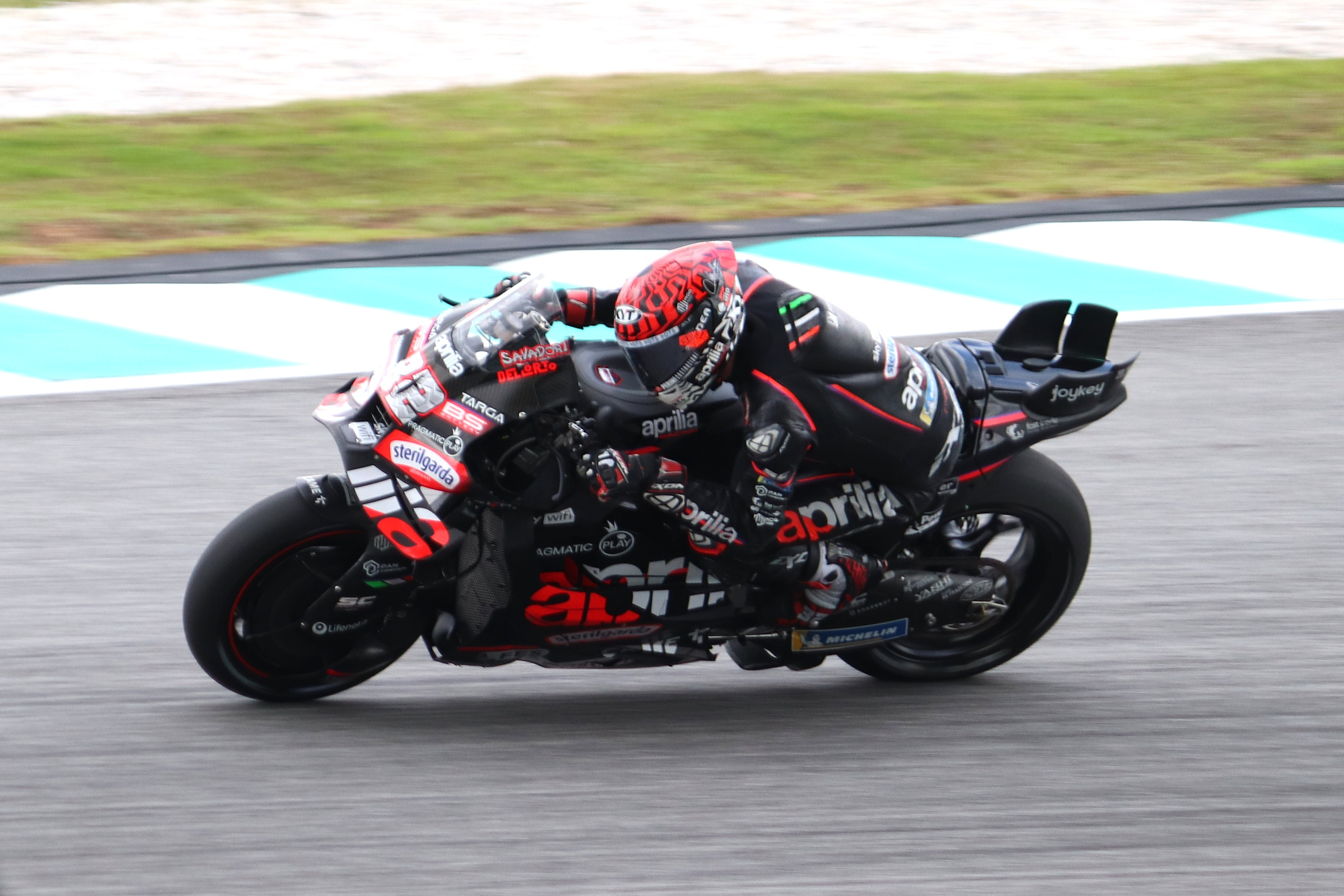
Savadori at the 2025 Malaysian Grand Prix

Savadori debuted in the MotoGP class replacing Bradley Smith as the substitute for the suspended Andrea Iannone.

Savadori replaced reigning world champion Jorge Martín in the Thailand, Argentine and Americas rounds of the 2025 season after the former injured his left wrist in training during pre-season. He replaced Martín again from the Spanish Grand Prix onwards after the latter was injured again in an accident at the Qatar Grand Prix. In a wet race at Le Mans, Savadori broke his record MotoGP feature race finish, with ninth place.

== Career statistics ==
=== Red Bull MotoGP Rookies Cup ===
==== Races by year ====
(key) (Races in bold indicate pole position, races in italics indicate fastest lap)

Year	1	2	3	4	5	6	7	8	Pos	Pts
2007	SPA; 1	ITA; 2	**GBR**; 1	NED; 11	GER; 5	CZE; Ret	POR; 10	VAL; 6	2nd	102

=== Grand Prix motorcycle racing ===
==== By season ====
Season	Class	Motorcycle	Team	Race	Win	Podium	Pole	FLap	Pts	Plcd
2008	125cc	Aprilia	RCGM	2	0	0	0	0	0	29th
2008	125cc	Aprilia	I.C. Team	1	0	0	0	0	3	29th
2009	125cc	Aprilia	Fontana Racing	12	0	0	0	0	7	26th
2009	125cc	Aprilia	Junior GP Racing Dream	1	0	0	0	0	0	26th
2010	125cc	Aprilia	Matteoni CP Racing	14	0	0	0	0	5	23rd
2019	MotoE	Energica	Trentino Gresini MotoE	6	0	0	0	0	24	16th
2020	MotoGP	Aprilia	Aprilia Racing Team Gresini	3	0	0	0	0	0	25th
2021	MotoGP	Aprilia	Aprilia Racing Team Gresini	9	0	0	0	0	4	26th
2022	MotoGP	Aprilia	Aprilia Racing	5	0	0	0	0	0	28th
2023	MotoGP	Aprilia	CryptoData RNF MotoGP Team	2	0	0	0	0	12	24th
2023	MotoGP	Aprilia	Aprilia Racing	3	0	0	0	0	12	24th
2024	MotoGP	Aprilia	Aprilia Racing	3	0	0	0	0	0	28th
2024	MotoGP	Aprilia	Trackhouse Racing	4	0	0	0	0	0	28th
2025	MotoGP	Aprilia	Aprilia Racing	13	0	0	0	0	8	24th
2026	MotoGP	Aprilia	Aprilia Racing	1	0	0	0	0	0*	29th*
2026	MotoGP	Aprilia	SuperFile Trackhouse MotoGP Team	1	0	0	0	0	0*	29th*
Total				**80**	**0**	**0**	**0**	**0**	**63**	

==== By class ====
Class	Seasons	1st GP	1st pod	1st win	Race	Win	Podiums	Pole	FLap	Pts	WChmp
125cc	2008–2010	2008 Italy			30	0	0	0	0	15	0
MotoE	2019	2019 Germany			6	0	0	0	0	24	0
MotoGP	2020–2026	2020 Europe			44	0	0	0	0	24	0
Total	2008–2010, 2019–2026				**80**	**0**	**0**	**0**	**0**	**63**	**0**

==== Races by year ====
(key) (Races in bold indicate pole position, races in italics indicate fastest lap)

Year	Class	Bike	1	2	3	4	5	6	7	8	9	10	11	12	13	14	15	16	17	18	19	20	21	22	Pos	Pts
2008	125cc	Aprilia	QAT	SPA	POR	CHN	FRA	ITA; 22	CAT	GBR	NED	GER	CZE	RSM; Ret	INP	JPN	AUS	MAL	VAL; 13						29th	3
2009	125cc	Aprilia	QAT; 21	JPN; Ret	SPA; 21	FRA; Ret	ITA; 9	CAT; Ret	NED; Ret	GER; 20	GBR; Ret	CZE; Ret	INP; Ret	RSM; Ret	POR	AUS	MAL	VAL; Ret							26th	7
2010	125cc	Aprilia	QAT; Ret	SPA; Ret	FRA; Ret	ITA; Ret	GBR; 21	NED; Ret	CAT; DNS	GER; 12	CZE; Ret	INP; 15	RSM; Ret	ARA	JPN; Ret	MAL; Ret	AUS; Ret	POR; DNS	VAL; 19						23rd	5
2019	MotoE	Energica	GER; Ret	AUT; 10	RSM1; 7	RSM2; 11	VAL1; 15	VAL2; 13																	16th	24
2020	MotoGP	Aprilia	SPA	ANC	CZE	AUT	STY	RSM	EMI	CAT	FRA	ARA	TER	EUR; Ret	VAL; 18	POR; Ret									25th	0
2021	MotoGP	Aprilia	QAT; 19	DOH; 20	POR; 14	SPA; 19	FRA; Ret	ITA; 15	CAT; 15	GER; Ret	NED; 16	STY; DNS	AUT	GBR; DNS	ARA	RSM	AME	EMI; DNS	ALR	VAL					26th	4
2022	MotoGP	Aprilia	QAT	INA	ARG	AME	POR; Ret	SPA; 21	FRA	ITA; 22	CAT	GER	NED; 20	GBR	AUT; 19	RSM	ARA	JPN	THA	AUS	MAL	VAL			28th	0
2023	MotoGP	Aprilia	POR	ARG	AME	SPA	FRA; 12	ITA; 18	GER	NED; 11	GBR	AUT; 19	CAT	RSM	IND	JPN	INA	AUS	THA	MAL	QAT	VAL; 13			24th	12
2024	MotoGP	Aprilia	QAT	POR	AME	SPA; Ret	FRA	CAT	ITA; 21	NED; DNS	GER	GBR	AUT; 20	CAT	RSM	EMI	INA	JPN; Ret	AUS; Ret	THA; Ret	MAL; 18	SLD			28th	0
2025	MotoGP	Aprilia	THA; 20	ARG; DNS	AME; 15	QAT	SPA; 18	FRA; 9	GBR; 18	ARA; 17	ITA; 17	NED; Ret	GER; Ret	CZE	AUT	HUN	CAT; Ret	RSM	JPN	INA	AUS; 16	MAL; 16	POR; 16	VAL	24th	8
2026	MotoGP	Aprilia	THA	BRA	USA	SPA; Ret	FRA	CAT	ITA	HUN	CZE	NED	GER	GBR	ARA; 17	RSM	AUT	JPN	INA	AUS	MAL	QAT	POR	VAL	29th*	0*

=== FIM Superstock 1000 Cup ===
==== Races by year ====
(key) (Races in bold indicate pole position, races in italics indicate fastest lap)

Year	Bike	1	2	3	4	5	6	7	8	9	10	Pos	Pts
2011	Kawasaki	ASS; 15	MON; 13	MIS; 10	ARA; Ret	BRN; 10	SIL; 26	NÜR; 13	IMO; 10	MAG; 10	POR; Ret	15th	31
2012	Ducati	IMO; 8	ASS; 2	MON; 1	MIS; 5	ARA; 13	BRN; 17	SIL; Ret	NÜR; 5	POR; 4	MAG; 3	5th	107
2013	Kawasaki	ARA; Ret	ASS; 8	MNZ; 1	POR; Ret	IMO; 4	SIL1; 5	SIL2; 3	NÜR; 7	MAG; 3	JER; 24	5th	98
2014	Kawasaki	ARA; 2	**ASS**; 4	IMO; Ret	**MIS**; 1	**POR**; 1	JER; 3	**MAG**; 6				2nd	109
2015	Aprilia	**ARA**; 2	**ASS**; 1	IMO; 1	DON; 1	POR; 2	**MIS**; 1	JER; 3	**MAG**; 8			1st	164

=== Superbike World Championship ===
==== Races by year ====
(key) (Races in bold indicate pole position, races in italics indicate fastest lap)

Year	Bike	1		2		3		4		5		6		7		8		9		10		11		12		13		14		Pos	Pts
Year	Bike	R1	R2	R1	R2	R1	R2	R1	R2	R1	R2	R1	R2	R1	R2	R1	R2	R1	R2	R1	R2	R1	R2	R1	R2	R1	R2	R1	R2	Pos	Pts
2013	Kawasaki	AUS	AUS	SPA	SPA	NED	NED	ITA	ITA	GBR	GBR	POR	POR	ITA	ITA	RUS; Ret	RUS; C	GBR	GBR	GER	GER	TUR	TUR	USA	USA	FRA	FRA	SPA	SPA	NC	0
2016	Aprilia	AUS; 12	AUS; Ret	THA; 10	THA; 9	SPA; 10	SPA; 11	NED; 6	NED; 4	ITA; 8	ITA; 11	MAL; Ret	MAL; 14	GBR; 6	GBR; 4	ITA; Ret	ITA; 5	USA; 6	USA; Ret	GER; Ret	GER; Ret	FRA; 5	FRA; 6	SPA; 13	SPA; 10	QAT; 10	QAT; 12			10th	150
2017	Aprilia	AUS; Ret	AUS; 9	THA; 13	THA; Ret	SPA	SPA	NED; 5	NED; Ret	ITA; 12	ITA; 13	GBR; 12	GBR; Ret	ITA; 9	ITA; 6	USA; 10	USA; 8	GER; 7	GER; 7	POR; 8	POR; 6	FRA; 11	FRA; Ret	SPA; 7	SPA; 18	QAT; 5	QAT; Ret			11th	124
2018	Aprilia	AUS; DNS	AUS; DNS	THA; 12	THA; 9	SPA; 15	SPA; 10	NED; 15	NED; 10	ITA; 8	ITA; Ret	GBR; 5	GBR; 7	CZE; 7	CZE; 5	USA; 14	USA; Ret	ITA; 8	ITA; 7	POR; Ret	POR; 6	FRA; 4	FRA; 6	ARG; Ret	ARG; 8	QAT; 11	QAT; C			10th	138

Sporting positions
Preceded by Michele Pirro	Italian Superbike champion 2020	Succeeded by Incumbent
Preceded by Leandro Mercado	FIM Superstock 1000 champion 2015	Succeeded by Raffaele De Rosa
Preceded by Roberto Lacalendola	Italian 125GP champion 2008	Succeeded by Riccardo Moretti
