= Cristian Trabalón =

Spanish motorcycle racer

- Nationality: Spanish
- Born: 27 June 1992 (age 34); Arboleas, Spain

Cristian Trabalón Laso is a Grand Prix motorcycle racer from Spain.

== Career statistics ==
=== Red Bull MotoGP Rookies Cup ===
==== Races by year ====
(key) (Races in bold indicate pole position, races in italics indicate fastest lap)

| Year | 1 | 2 | 3 | 4 | 5 | 6 | 7 | 8 | 9 | 10 | Pos | Pts |
|---|---|---|---|---|---|---|---|---|---|---|---|---|
| 2007 | SPA; 6 | ITA; Ret | GBR; Ret | NED; 4 | GER; Ret | CZE; 5 | POR; 12 | VAL; Ret | | | 13th | 38 |
| 2008 | SPA1; Ret | SPA2; 11 | POR; 15 | FRA; 10 | ITA; 16 | GBR | NED; 9 | GER; 9 | CZE1 | CZE2 | 16th | 26 |

=== Grand Prix motorcycle racing ===
==== By season ====
| Season | Class | Motorcycle | Team | Number | Race | Win | Podium | Pole | FLap | Pts | Plcd |
|---|---|---|---|---|---|---|---|---|---|---|---|
| 2008 | 125cc | Aprilia | Alpo Atletico de Madrid | 25 | 1 | 0 | 0 | 0 | 0 | 0 | NC |
| Total | | | | | **1** | **0** | **0** | **0** | **0** | **0** | |

==== Races by year ====
(key)

| Year | Class | Bike | 1 | 2 | 3 | 4 | 5 | 6 | 7 | 8 | 9 | 10 | 11 | 12 | 13 | 14 | 15 | 16 | 17 | Pos. | Pts |
|---|---|---|---|---|---|---|---|---|---|---|---|---|---|---|---|---|---|---|---|---|---|
| 2008 | 125cc | Aprilia | QAT | SPA | POR | CHN | FRA | ITA | CAT | GBR | NED | GER | CZE | RSM | INP | JPN | AUS | MAL | VAL; 25 | NC | 0 |
