= 2007 Red Bull MotoGP Rookies Cup =

Motorcycle racing competition

2007 Red Bull MotoGP Rookies Cup season

Seasons
- ← none 2008 →

The 2007 Red Bull MotoGP Rookies Cup was the first season of the Red Bull MotoGP Rookies Cup. The season, contested by the riders on equal KTM 125cc bikes, began with one race during the Spanish Grand Prix weekend at Jerez on March 25 and ended with another race header at the Valencian Grand Prix in Valencia on November 3; another six European GPs saw single Rookies races on each Saturday, making it an eight-race championship. The French Johann Zarco was proclaimed champion after the penultimate race.

== Calendar ==
2007 calendar
Round	Date	Circuit	Pole position	Fastest lap	Race winner
1	March 25	(Spain) Jerez	(Spain) Luis Salom	(Italy) Lorenzo Savadori	(Italy) Lorenzo Savadori
2	June 2	(Italy) Mugello	(France) Johann Zarco	(France) Johann Zarco	(France) Johann Zarco
3	June 23	(United Kingdom) Donington	(Italy) Lorenzo Savadori	(Italy) Lorenzo Savadori	(Italy) Lorenzo Savadori
4	June 30	(Netherlands) Assen	(France) Johann Zarco	(Spain) Luis Salom	(Spain) Luis Salom
5	July 14	(Germany) Sachsenring	(France) Johann Zarco	(United States) Cameron Beaubier	(United States) Cameron Beaubier
6	August 18	(Czech Republic) Brno	(United States) Cameron Beaubier	(United Kingdom) Matthew Hoyle	(France) Johann Zarco
7	September 15	(Portugal) Estoril	(France) Johann Zarco	(France) Johann Zarco	(France) Johann Zarco
8	November 3	(Valencian Community) Valencia	(United States) Cameron Beaubier	(France) Johann Zarco	(France) Johann Zarco

== Entry list ==
No.	Rider	Rounds
3	(Germany) Daniel Kartheininger	All
5	(France) Johann Zarco	All
6	(Hungary) Péter Sebestyén	2–8
7	(United Kingdom) Deane Brown	1, 3–8
9	(Czech Republic) Lukáš Šembera	All
11	(United Kingdom) Jamie Mossey	All
12	(Spain) Javier Cholbi	All
16	(United States) Cameron Beaubier	All
21	(Spain) Kevin Sánchez	3–8
22	(France) Cyril Carrillo	All
23	(United Kingdom) Matthew Hoyle	All
28	(Germany) Markus Reiterberger	All
32	(Italy) Lorenzo Savadori	All
33	(Norway) Sturla Fagerhaug	All
35	(Germany) Christoph Schönberger	1–2, 5–8
36	(United Kingdom) Stuart Mitchell	1–6, 8
38	(United States) Kristian Lee Turner	All
39	(Spain) Luis Salom	All
52	(United Kingdom) Adam Blacklock	All
56	(Japan) Daijiro Hiura	8
62	(Japan) Yuga Yokoo	8
66	(Sweden) Robert Gull	All
69	(Germany) Lucy Glöckner	All
73	(United States) J. D. Beach	All
92	(Spain) Cristian Trabalón	All

- All entrants were riding a KTM
- Tyres were supplied by Dunlop

== Championship standings ==
Points were awarded to the top fifteen finishers, provided the rider finished the race.

Position	1st	2nd	3rd	4th	5th	6th	7th	8th	9th	10th	11th	12th	13th	14th	15th
Points	25	20	16	13	11	10	9	8	7	6	5	4	3	2	1

Pos.	Rider	ESP (Spain)	ITA (Italy)	GBR (United Kingdom)	NED (Netherlands)	GER (Germany)	CZE (Czech Republic)	POR (Portugal)	VAL (Valencian Community)	Pts
1	(France) Johann Zarco	3	1	2	13	2	1	1	1	159
2	(Italy) Lorenzo Savadori	1	2	1	11	5	Ret	10	6	102
3	(United Kingdom) Matthew Hoyle	16	4	3	7	6	2	3	5	95
4	(Spain) Luis Salom	2	Ret	Ret	1	Ret	4	7	4	80
5	(France) Cyril Carrillo	5	11	8	5	Ret	3	4	3	80
6	(United States) Cameron Beaubier	15	Ret	6	2	1	Ret	2	15	79
7	(United Kingdom) Deane Brown	8		5	6	Ret	9	5	2	67
8	(Germany) Markus Reiterberger	7	8	4	12	4	14	15	12	55
9	(Sweden) Robert Gull	4	12	17	Ret	3	7	6	Ret	52
10	(United States) Kristian Lee Turner	Ret	3	NC	3	14	Ret	9	8	49
11	(Norway) Sturla Fagerhaug	9	6	12	17	Ret	6	13	7	43
12	(Germany) Daniel Kartheininger	11	Ret	10	8	7	Ret	11	11	39
13	(Spain) Cristian Trabalón	6	Ret	Ret	4	Ret	5	12	Ret	38
14	(Germany) Lucy Glöckner	Ret	Ret	7	9	9	10	Ret	10	36
15	(Czech Republic) Lukáš Šembera	Ret	9	11	14	8	12	20	16	28
16	(United States) J. D. Beach	14	10	13	10	13	8	17	18	28
17	(United Kingdom) Adam Blacklock	10	15	14	15	10	11	14	17	24
18	(Germany) Christoph Schönberger	12	9			15	15	18	14	17
19	(United Kingdom) Jamie Mossey	Ret	Ret	9	Ret	17	Ret	8	19	15
20	(Spain) Javier Cholbi	13	14	15	16	11	13	16	20	14
21	(United Kingdom) Stuart Mitchell	17	5	Ret	19	Ret	16		22	11
22	(Hungary) Péter Sebestyén		13	Ret	18	12	Ret	21	21	7
	(Japan) Daijiro Hiura								9	0
	(Japan) Yuga Yokoo								13	0
	(Spain) Kevin Sánchez			16		16	Ret	19	Ret	0
Pos.	Rider	ESP (Spain)	ITA (Italy)	GBR (United Kingdom)	NED (Netherlands)	GER (Germany)	CZE (Czech Republic)	POR (Portugal)	VAL (Valencian Community)	Pts

Colour	Result
Gold	Winner
Silver	Second place
Bronze	Third place
Green	Points classification
Blue	Non-points classification
Blue	Non-classified finish (NC)
Purple	Retired, not classified (Ret)
Red	Did not qualify (DNQ)
Red	Did not pre-qualify (DNPQ)
Black	Disqualified (DSQ)
White	Did not start (DNS)
White	Withdrew (WD)
White	Race cancelled (C)
Blank	Did not practice (DNP)
Blank	Did not arrive (DNA)
Blank	Excluded (EX)
