= Robin Lässer =

German motorcycle racer

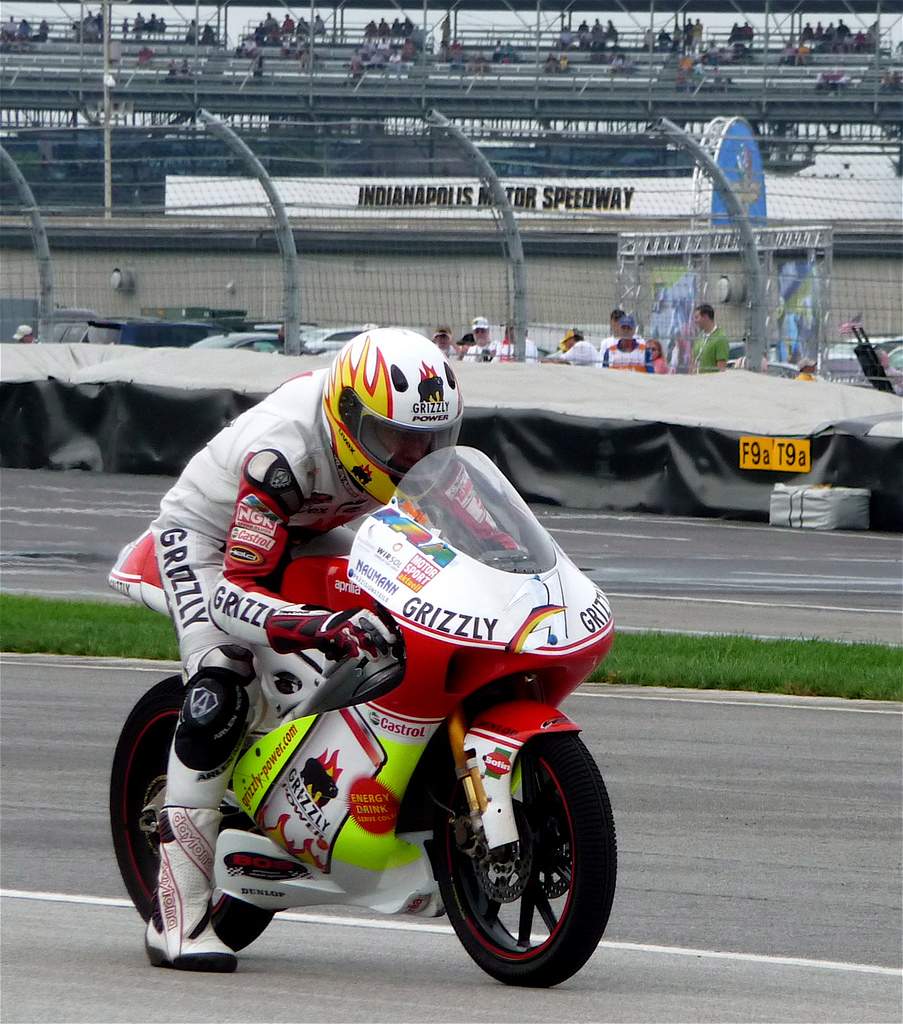
- Lässer at the 2008 Indianapolis Grand Prix
- Nationality: German
- Born: 12 January 1991 (age 35); Isny im Allgäu, Germany

Robin Lässer (born 12 January 1991) is a Grand Prix motorcycle racer from Germany.

== Career statistics ==
=== By season ===
Season	Class	Motorcycle	Team	Number	Race	Win	Podium	Pole	FLap	Pts	Plcd
2008	125cc	Aprilia	Grizzly Gas Kiefer Racing	21	15	0	0	0	0	2	31st
Total					15	0	0	0	0	2	

=== Races by year ===
Year	Class	Bike	1	2	3	4	5	6	7	8	9	10	11	12	13	14	15	16	17	Pos	Points
2008	125cc	Aprilia	QAT; 23	SPA; DNS	POR	CHN; Ret	FRA; Ret	ITA; 28	CAT; Ret	GBR; 21	NED; 22	GER; Ret	CZE; 15	RSM; 20	INP; 17	JPN; 23	AUS; 15	MAL; 20	VAL; Ret	31st	2
