= 2009 Spanish motorcycle Grand Prix =

(Spain) 2009 Spanish Grand Prix
Race details
- Race 3 of 17 races in the 2009 Grand Prix motorcycle racing season
- Date: 3 May 2009
- Official name: Gran Premio bwin.com de España
- Location: Circuito de Jerez
- Course: Permanent racing facility; 4.423 km (2.748 mi)

MotoGP
Pole position
- Rider: (Spain) Jorge Lorenzo
- Time: 1:38.933
Fastest lap
- Rider: (Italy) Valentino Rossi
- Time: 1:39.818
Podium
- First: (Italy) Valentino Rossi
- Second: (Spain) Dani Pedrosa
- Third: (Australia) Casey Stoner

250cc
Pole position
- Rider: (Spain) Alex Debón
- Time: 1:43.028
Fastest lap
- Rider: (Spain) Álvaro Bautista
- Time: 1:43.338
Podium
- First: (Japan) Hiroshi Aoyama
- Second: (Spain) Álvaro Bautista
- Third: (Italy) Marco Simoncelli

125cc
Pole position
- Rider: (Spain) Julián Simón
- Time: 1:48.237
Fastest lap
- Rider: (Spain) Julián Simón
- Time: 1:47.057
Podium
- First: (United Kingdom) Bradley Smith
- Second: (Spain) Sergio Gadea
- Third: (Spain) Marc Márquez

The 2009 Spanish motorcycle Grand Prix was the third round of the 2009 Grand Prix motorcycle racing season. It took place on the weekend of 1–3 May 2009 at the Circuito de Jerez located in Jerez de la Frontera, Spain.

== Report ==
In the MotoGP race, Valentino Rossi achieved his first win of the season to go top of the world championship standings, the world champion came home ahead of home favourite Dani Pedrosa, with Casey Stoner in third place. In the 250cc race, Hiroshi Aoyama capitalised on a late mistake of another home favourite, Álvaro Bautista, to take his first win since the 2007 Malaysian motorcycle Grand Prix. In the 125cc race, British rider Bradley Smith dominated the race to achieve his first victory at the 50th attempt, after title rivals Andrea Iannone and Julián Simón both crashed.

== MotoGP classification ==
Pos.	No.	Rider	Team	Manufacturer	Laps	Time/Retired	Grid	Points
1	46	(Italy) Valentino Rossi	Fiat Yamaha Team	Yamaha	27	45:18.557	4	25
2	3	(Spain) Dani Pedrosa	Repsol Honda Team	Honda	27	+2.700	2	20
3	27	(Australia) Casey Stoner	Ducati Marlboro Team	Ducati	27	+10.507	3	16
4	14	(France) Randy de Puniet	LCR Honda MotoGP	Honda	27	+31.893	5	13
5	33	(Italy) Marco Melandri	Hayate Racing Team	Kawasaki	27	+33.128	11	11
6	65	(Italy) Loris Capirossi	Rizla Suzuki MotoGP	Suzuki	27	+34.128	6	10
7	5	(United States) Colin Edwards	Monster Yamaha Tech 3	Yamaha	27	+34.421	7	9
8	4	(Italy) Andrea Dovizioso	Repsol Honda Team	Honda	27	+34.625	8	8
9	24	(Spain) Toni Elías	San Carlo Honda Gresini	Honda	27	+42.689	9	7
10	7	(Australia) Chris Vermeulen	Rizla Suzuki MotoGP	Suzuki	27	+45.183	10	6
11	59	(Spain) Sete Gibernau	Grupo Francisco Hernando	Ducati	27	+48.192	12	5
12	72	(Japan) Yuki Takahashi	Scot Racing Team MotoGP	Honda	27	+51.875	13	4
13	52	(United Kingdom) James Toseland	Monster Yamaha Tech 3	Yamaha	27	+53.683	14	3
14	15	(San Marino) Alex de Angelis	San Carlo Honda Gresini	Honda	27	+53.941	15	2
15	69	(United States) Nicky Hayden	Ducati Marlboro Team	Ducati	27	+1:01.237	16	1
16	88	(Italy) Niccolò Canepa	Pramac Racing	Ducati	27	+1:10.896	18	
Ret	99	(Spain) Jorge Lorenzo	Fiat Yamaha Team	Yamaha	23	Retirement	1	
Ret	36	(Finland) Mika Kallio	Pramac Racing	Ducati	12	Retirement	17	

== 250 cc classification ==
Pos.	No.	Rider	Manufacturer	Laps	Time/Retired	Grid	Points
1	4	(Japan) Hiroshi Aoyama	Honda	26	45:08.805	6	25
2	19	(Spain) Álvaro Bautista	Aprilia	26	+0.132	4	20
3	58	(Italy) Marco Simoncelli	Gilera	26	+2.706	3	16
4	40	(Spain) Héctor Barberá	Aprilia	26	+2.769	2	13
5	12	(Switzerland) Thomas Lüthi	Aprilia	26	+17.946	8	11
6	75	(Italy) Mattia Pasini	Aprilia	26	+17.950	15	10
7	28	(Hungary) Gábor Talmácsi	Aprilia	26	+26.288	10	9
8	16	(France) Jules Cluzel	Aprilia	26	+26.472	5	8
9	15	(Italy) Roberto Locatelli	Gilera	26	+27.646	16	7
10	35	(Italy) Raffaele De Rosa	Honda	26	+32.369	12	6
11	63	(France) Mike Di Meglio	Aprilia	26	+32.617	7	5
12	48	(Japan) Shoya Tomizawa	Honda	26	+34.241	17	4
13	52	(Czech Republic) Lukáš Pešek	Aprilia	26	+36.889	11	3
14	55	(Spain) Héctor Faubel	Honda	26	+37.237	9	2
15	14	(Thailand) Ratthapark Wilairot	Honda	26	+1:16.786	13	1
16	10	(Hungary) Imre Tóth	Aprilia	26	+1:25.509	19	
17	8	(Switzerland) Bastien Chesaux	Honda	25	+1 lap	22	
18	77	(Spain) Aitor Rodríguez	Aprilia	25	+1 lap	20	
19	56	(Russia) Vladimir Leonov	Aprilia	25	+1 lap	23	
20	53	(France) Valentin Debise	Honda	25	+1 lap	24	
Ret	7	(Spain) Axel Pons	Aprilia	22	Retirement	21	
Ret	76	(Spain) Iván Maestro	Aprilia	18	Retirement	25	
Ret	25	(Italy) Alex Baldolini	Aprilia	10	Retirement	18	
Ret	6	(Spain) Alex Debón	Aprilia	9	Accident	1	
Ret	17	(Czech Republic) Karel Abraham	Aprilia	3	Accident	14	
DNQ	54	(United Kingdom) Toby Markham	Honda		Did not qualify		
OFFICIAL 250cc REPORT

== 125 cc classification ==
Pos.	No.	Rider	Manufacturer	Laps	Time/Retired	Grid	Points
1	38	(United Kingdom) Bradley Smith	Aprilia	23	41:49.556	2	25
2	33	(Spain) Sergio Gadea	Aprilia	23	+13.524	5	20
3	93	(Spain) Marc Márquez	KTM	23	+13.553	4	16
4	45	(United Kingdom) Scott Redding	Aprilia	23	+14.251	7	13
5	7	(Spain) Efrén Vázquez	Derbi	23	+14.758	15	11
6	11	(Germany) Sandro Cortese	Derbi	23	+15.545	9	10
7	44	(Spain) Pol Espargaró	Derbi	23	+15.556	10	9
8	99	(United Kingdom) Danny Webb	Aprilia	23	+17.772	8	8
9	77	(Switzerland) Dominique Aegerter	Derbi	23	+18.960	6	7
10	18	(Spain) Nicolás Terol	Aprilia	23	+19.053	18	6
11	6	(Spain) Joan Olivé	Derbi	23	+32.480	11	5
12	12	(Spain) Esteve Rabat	Aprilia	23	+32.554	16	4
13	14	(France) Johann Zarco	Aprilia	23	+33.378	19	3
14	24	(Italy) Simone Corsi	Aprilia	23	+41.533	12	2
15	16	(United States) Cameron Beaubier	KTM	23	+44.443	17	1
16	73	(Japan) Takaaki Nakagami	Aprilia	23	+44.738	21	
17	35	(Switzerland) Randy Krummenacher	Aprilia	23	+44.934	13	
18	8	(Italy) Lorenzo Zanetti	Aprilia	23	+44.977	26	
19	29	(Italy) Andrea Iannone	Aprilia	23	+55.464	3	
20	69	(Czech Republic) Lukáš Šembera	Aprilia	23	+1:05.314	23	
21	32	(Italy) Lorenzo Savadori	Aprilia	23	+1:07.420	22	
22	42	(Spain) Alberto Moncayo	Aprilia	23	+1:16.825	25	
23	39	(Spain) Luis Salom	Honda	23	+1:25.188	29	
24	53	(Netherlands) Jasper Iwema	Honda	23	+1:28.903	24	
25	87	(Italy) Luca Marconi	Aprilia	23	+1:29.012	28	
26	41	(Spain) Borja Maestro	Aprilia	22	+1 lap	30	
27	31	(Spain) Jordi Dalmau	Honda	22	+1 lap	34	
28	40	(Spain) Eduard López	Aprilia	22	+1 lap	33	
Ret	94	(Germany) Jonas Folger	Aprilia	21	Accident	35	
Ret	71	(Japan) Tomoyoshi Koyama	Loncin	21	Accident	20	
Ret	5	(France) Alexis Masbou	Loncin	13	Retirement	27	
Ret	17	(Germany) Stefan Bradl	Aprilia	8	Retirement	14	
Ret	60	(Spain) Julián Simón	Aprilia	5	Accident	1	
DNS	88	(Austria) Michael Ranseder	Haojue	0	Did not start	32	
DSQ	10	(Italy) Luca Vitali	Aprilia	10	Black flag	31	
DNQ	66	(United Kingdom) Matthew Hoyle	Haojue		Did not qualify		
OFFICIAL 125cc REPORT

== Championship standings after the race (MotoGP) ==
Below are the standings for the top five riders and constructors after round three has concluded.

Riders' Championship standings

Pos.	Rider	Points
1	(Italy) Valentino Rossi	65
2	(Australia) Casey Stoner	54
3	(Spain) Jorge Lorenzo	41
4	(Spain) Dani Pedrosa	41
5	(Italy) Andrea Dovizioso	30

Constructors' Championship standings

Pos.	Constructor	Points
1	(Japan) Yamaha	70
2	(Italy) Ducati	54
3	(Japan) Honda	47
4	(Japan) Suzuki	28
5	(Japan) Kawasaki	23

- Note: Only the top five positions are included for both sets of standings.

Previous race: 2009 Japanese Grand Prix	FIM Grand Prix World Championship; 2009 season	Next race: 2009 French Grand Prix
Previous race: 2008 Spanish Grand Prix	Spanish motorcycle Grand Prix	Next race: 2010 Spanish Grand Prix
