= 2025 French motorcycle Grand Prix =

Motorcycle races in Le Mans

(France) 2025 French Grand Prix
Race details
- Race 6 of 22 races in the 2025 Grand Prix motorcycle racing season
- Date: 10–11 May 2025
- Official name: Michelin Grand Prix of France
- Location: Bugatti Circuit; Le Mans, France
- Course: Permanent racing facility; 4.185 km (2.600 mi)

MotoGP
Pole position
Rider	(France) Fabio Quartararo	Yamaha
Time	1:29.324	
Fastest lap
Rider	(Spain) Álex Márquez	Ducati
Time	1:34.187 on lap 3	
Podium
First	(France) Johann Zarco	Honda
Second	(Spain) Marc Márquez	Ducati
Third	(Spain) Fermín Aldeguer	Ducati

Moto2
Pole position
Rider	(Spain) Manuel González	Kalex
Time	1:34.315	
Fastest lap
Rider	(Belgium) Barry Baltus	Kalex
Time	1:34.941 on lap 10	
Podium
First	(Spain) Manuel González	Kalex
Second	(Belgium) Barry Baltus	Kalex
Third	(Spain) Arón Canet	Kalex

Moto3
Pole position
Rider	(Spain) Máximo Quiles	KTM
Time	1:39.947	
Fastest lap
Rider	(Spain) Álvaro Carpe	KTM
Time	1:40.838 on lap 11	
Podium
First	(Spain) José Antonio Rueda	KTM
Second	(Australia) Joel Kelso	KTM
Third	(Spain) David Muñoz	KTM

MotoE Race 1
Pole position
Rider	(Italy) Alessandro Zaccone	Ducati
Time	1:39.545	
Fastest lap
Rider	(Italy) Andrea Mantovani	Ducati
Time	1:39.736 on lap 2	
Podium
First	(Spain) Óscar Gutiérrez	Ducati
Second	(Italy) Andrea Mantovani	Ducati
Third	(Italy) Alessandro Zaccone	Ducati

MotoE Race 2
Pole position
Rider	(Italy) Alessandro Zaccone	Ducati
Time	1:39.545	
Fastest lap
Rider	(Italy) Mattia Casadei	Ducati
Time	1:40.080 on lap 3	
Podium
First	(Italy) Mattia Casadei	Ducati
Second	(Italy) Kevin Zannoni	Ducati
Third	(Spain) Jordi Torres	Ducati

The 2025 French motorcycle Grand Prix (officially known as the Michelin Grand Prix of France) was the sixth round of the 2025 Grand Prix motorcycle racing season and the first round of the 2025 MotoE World Championship. All races (except for both MotoE races which were held on 10 May) were held at the Bugatti Circuit in Le Mans on 11 May 2025.

Johann Zarco became the first French rider to win in Le Mans since Pierre Monneret in 1954 during a dramatic race marked by changing weather conditions. It was Zarco's first win since Phillip Island in 2023 for Pramac Racing, and LCR Honda's first win since Álex Rins at Circuit of the Americas earlier in the same year. Championship leader Marc Márquez finished second for the Ducati factory team, ending the constructor's streak of 22 consecutive Grand Prix wins, a record they were previously tied with Honda. Honda's record was 22 wins in a row from Malaysia in 1997 to the Dutch TT in 1998. Fermín Aldeguer managed to achieve his first podium in the premier class after finishing in 3rd place as a rookie.

For the first time in history, MotoGP welcomed more than 311,797 attendance to a grand prix.

== Practice session ==
=== MotoGP ===
==== Combined Free Practice 1-2 ====
Practice times (written in bold) are the fastest times in the session.

Fastest session lap

Pos.	No.	Biker	Team	Constructor	Practice times	
Pos.	No.	Biker	Team	Constructor	P1	P2
1	20	(France) Fabio Quartararo	Monster Energy Yamaha MotoGP Team	Yamaha	1:31.442	**1:30.546**
2	93	(Spain) Marc Márquez	Ducati Lenovo Team	Ducati	1:30.764	**1:30.612**
3	54	(Spain) Fermín Aldeguer	BK8 Gresini Racing MotoGP	Ducati	1:31.621	**1:30.703**
4	63	(Italy) Francesco Bagnaia	Ducati Lenovo Team	Ducati	1:31.397	**1:30.748**
5	73	(Spain) Álex Márquez	BK8 Gresini Racing MotoGP	Ducati	1:31.384	**1:30.750**
6	12	(Spain) Maverick Viñales	Red Bull KTM Tech3	KTM	1:31.637	**1:30.908**
7	37	(Spain) Pedro Acosta	Red Bull KTM Factory Racing	KTM	1:31.686	**1:30.957**
8	21	(Italy) Franco Morbidelli	Pertamina Enduro VR46 Racing Team	Ducati	1:31.506	**1:31.084**
9	5	(France) Johann Zarco	Castrol Honda LCR	Honda	1:31.568	**1:31.121**
10	10	(Italy) Luca Marini	Honda HRC Castrol	Honda	1:31.805	**1:31.197**
11	49	(Italy) Fabio Di Giannantonio	Pertamina Enduro VR46 Racing Team	Ducati	1:31.763	**1:31.211**
12	36	(Spain) Joan Mir	Honda HRC Castrol	Honda	1:31.773	**1:31.239**
13	33	(South Africa) Brad Binder	Red Bull KTM Factory Racing	KTM	1:31.340	**1:31.244**
14	72	(Italy) Marco Bezzecchi	Aprilia Racing	Aprilia	1:31.923	**1:31.328**
15	79	(Japan) Ai Ogura	Trackhouse MotoGP Team	Aprilia	**1:31.404**	1:31.823
16	23	(Italy) Enea Bastianini	Red Bull KTM Tech3	KTM	1:32.310	**1:31.477**
17	43	(Australia) Jack Miller	Prima Pramac Yamaha MotoGP	Yamaha	1:31.711	**1:31.615**
18	42	(Spain) Álex Rins	Monster Energy Yamaha MotoGP Team	Yamaha	1:32.158	**1:31.644**
19	25	(Spain) Raúl Fernández	Trackhouse MotoGP Team	Aprilia	1:32.847	**1:31.730**
20	30	(Japan) Takaaki Nakagami	Honda HRC Test Team	Honda	1:32.436	**1:31.800**
21	88	(Portugal) Miguel Oliveira	Prima Pramac Yamaha MotoGP	Yamaha	1:34.131	**1:31.973**
22	32	(Spain) Lorenzo Savadori	Aprilia Racing	Aprilia	1:34.672	**1:33.221**
OFFICIAL MOTOGP COMBINED PRACTICE TIMES REPORT

==== Practice ====
The top 10 riders (written in bold) qualified for Q2.

Fastest session lap

Pos.	No.	Biker	Team	Constructor	
Pos.	No.	Biker	Team	Constructor	Time results
1	93	**(Spain) Marc Márquez**	**Ducati Lenovo Team**	**Ducati**	**1:29.855**
2	20	**(France) Fabio Quartararo**	**Monster Energy Yamaha MotoGP Team**	**Yamaha**	**1:30.032**
3	63	**(Italy) Francesco Bagnaia**	**Ducati Lenovo Team**	**Ducati**	**1:30.039**
4	54	**(Spain) Fermín Aldeguer**	**BK8 Gresini Racing MotoGP**	**Ducati**	**1:30.221**
5	73	**(Spain) Álex Márquez**	**BK8 Gresini Racing MotoGP**	**Ducati**	**1:30.256**
6	43	**(Australia) Jack Miller**	**Prima Pramac Yamaha MotoGP**	**Yamaha**	**1:30.277**
7	37	**(Spain) Pedro Acosta**	**Red Bull KTM Factory Racing**	**KTM**	**1:30.308**
8	12	**(Spain) Maverick Viñales**	**Red Bull KTM Tech3**	**KTM**	**1:30.490**
9	21	**(Italy) Franco Morbidelli**	**Pertamina Enduro VR46 Racing Team**	**Ducati**	**1:30.509**
10	72	**(Italy) Marco Bezzecchi**	**Aprilia Racing**	**Aprilia**	**1:30.622**
11	10	(Italy) Luca Marini	Honda HRC Castrol	Honda	1:30.675
12	5	(France) Johann Zarco	CASTROL Honda LCR	Honda	1:30.754
13	23	(Italy) Enea Bastianini	Red Bull KTM Tech3	KTM	1:30.801
14	36	(Spain) Joan Mir	Honda HRC Castrol	Honda	1:30.821
15	25	(Spain) Raúl Fernández	Trackhouse MotoGP Team	Aprilia	1:30.942
16	79	(Japan) Ai Ogura	Trackhouse MotoGP Team	Aprilia	1:31.165
17	42	(Spain) Álex Rins	Monster Energy Yamaha MotoGP Team	Yamaha	1:31.254
18	49	(Italy) Fabio Di Giannantonio	Pertamina Enduro VR46 Racing Team	Ducati	1:31.257
19	33	(South Africa) Brad Binder	Red Bull KTM Factory Racing	KTM	1:31.417
20	30	(Japan) Takaaki Nakagami	Honda HRC Test Team	Honda	1:31.555
21	88	(Portugal) Miguel Oliveira	Prima Pramac Yamaha MotoGP	Yamaha	1:32.325
22	32	(Italy) Lorenzo Savadori	Aprilia Racing	Aprilia	1:32.425
OFFICIAL MOTOGP PRACTICE TIMES REPORT

=== Moto2 ===
==== Combined Practice 1-2 ====
Fastest session lap

Pos.	No.	Biker	Team	Constructor	Practice times	
Pos.	No.	Biker	Team	Constructor	P1	P2
1	53	(Turkey) Deniz Öncü	Red Bull KTM Ajo	Kalex	1:35.562	**1:34.693**
2	18	(Spain) Manuel González	Liqui Moly Dynavolt Intact GP	Kalex	**1:34.916**	1:34.772
3	12	(Czech Republic) Filip Salač	Elf Marc VDS Racing Team	Boscoscuro	1:35.565	1:34.957
4	75	(Spain) Albert Arenas	Italjet Gresini Moto2	Kalex	1:35.733	1:34.980
5	96	(United Kingdom) Jake Dixon	Elf Marc VDS Racing Team	Boscoscuro	1:35.018	1:35.139
6	7	(Belgium) Barry Baltus	Fantic Racing Lino Sonego	Kalex	1:35.471	1:35.063
7	13	(Italy) Celestino Vietti	Folladore SpeedRS Team	Boscoscuro	1:35.429	1:35.063
8	14	(Italy) Tony Arbolino	Blu Cru Pramac Yamaha Moto2	Boscoscuro	1:35.077	1:35.129
9	21	(Spain) Alonso López	Folladore SpeedRS Team	Boscoscuro	1:35.506	1:35.098
10	44	(Spain) Arón Canet	Fantic Racing Lino Sonego	Kalex	1:35.660	1:35.232
11	81	(Australia) Senna Agius	Liqui Moly Dynavolt Intact GP	Kalex	1:35.922	1:35.374
12	84	(Netherlands) Zonta van den Goorbergh	RW-Idrofoglia Racing GP	Kalex	1:36.430	1:35.438
13	28	(Spain) Izan Guevara	Blu Cru Pramac Yamaha Moto2	Boscoscuro	1:36.035	1:35.502
14	24	(Spain) Marcos Ramírez	OnlyFans American Racing Team	Kalex	1:36.140	1:35.528
15	80	(Colombia) David Alonso	CFMoto Gaviota Aspar Team	Kalex	1:36.498	1:35.530
16	27	(Spain) Daniel Holgado	CFMoto Gaviota Aspar Team	Kalex	1:36.908	1:35.547
17	95	(Netherlands) Collin Veijer	Red Bull KTM Ajo	Kalex	1:36.674	1:35.562
18	16	(United States) Joe Roberts	OnlyFans American Racing Team	Kalex	1:35.813	1:35.652
19	71	(Japan) Ayumu Sasaki	RW-Idrofoglia Racing GP	Kalex	1:36.897	1:35.669
20	3	(Spain) Sergio García	QJMotor – Frinsa – MSi	Boscoscuro	1:36.501	1:35.688
21	4	(Spain) Iván Ortolá	QJMotor – Frinsa – MSi	Boscoscuro	1:36.854	1:35.770
22	9	(Spain) Jorge Navarro	Klint Forward Factory Team	Forward	1:36.211	1:35.822
23	10	(Brazil) Diogo Moreira	Italtrans Racing Team	Kalex	1:35.912	1:36.091
24	99	(Spain) Adrián Huertas	Italtrans Racing Team	Kalex	1:36.511	1:36.084
25	92	(Japan) Yuki Kunii	Idemitsu Honda Team Asia	Kalex	1:37.031	1:36.375
26	17	(Spain) Daniel Muñoz	Klint Forward Factory Team	Forward	No time	1:36.384
OFFICIAL MOTO2 FREE PRACTICE TIMES REPORT

==== Practice ====
The top 14 riders (written in bold) qualified for Q2.

Pos.	No.	Biker	Team	Constructor	Time results
Pos.	No.	Biker	Team	Constructor	P1
1	18	(Spain) **Manuel González**	**Liqui Moly Dynavolt Intact GP**	**Kalex**	**1:34.744**
2	10	(Brazil) **Diogo Moreira**	**Italtrans Racing Team**	**Kalex**	1:35.079
3	12	(Czech Republic) **Filip Salač**	**Elf Marc VDS Racing Team**	**Boscoscuro**	1:35.127
4	96	(United Kingdom) **Jake Dixon**	**Elf Marc VDS Racing Team**	**Boscoscuro**	1:35.189
5	13	(Italy) **Celestino Vietti**	**Folladore SpeedRS Team**	**Boscoscuro**	1:35.291
6	9	(Spain) **Jorge Navarro**	**Klint Forward Factory Team**	**Forward**	1:35.299
7	3	(Spain) **Sergio García**	**QJMotor – Frinsa – MSi**	**Boscoscuro**	1:35.303
8	21	(Spain) **Alonso López**	**Folladore SpeedRS Team**	**Boscoscuro**	1:35.341
9	75	(Spain) **Albert Arenas**	**Italjet Gresini Moto2**	**Kalex**	1:35.352
10	14	(Italy) **Tony Arbolino**	**Blu Cru Pramac Yamaha Moto2**	**Boscoscuro**	1:35.401
11	53	(Turkey) **Deniz Öncü**	**Red Bull KTM Ajo**	**Kalex**	1:35.464
12	44	(Spain) **Arón Canet**	**Fantic Racing Lino Sonego**	**Kalex**	1:35.475
13	81	(Australia) **Senna Agius**	**Liqui Moly Dynavolt Intact GP**	**Kalex**	1:35.516
14	28	(Spain) **Izan Guevara**	**Blu Cru Pramac Yamaha Moto2**	**Boscoscuro**	1:35.545
15	7	(Belgium) Barry Baltus	Fantic Racing Lino Sonego	Kalex	1:35.562
16	84	(Netherlands) Zonta van den Goorbergh	RW-Idrofoglia Racing GP	Kalex	1:35.680
17	27	(Spain) Daniel Holgado	CFMoto Gaviota Aspar Team	Kalex	1:35.759
18	24	(Spain) Marcos Ramírez	OnlyFans American Racing Team	Kalex	1:35.796
19	80	(Colombia) David Alonso	CFMoto Gaviota Aspar Team	Kalex	1:35.831
20	4	(Spain) Iván Ortolá	QJMotor – Frinsa – MSi	Boscoscuro	1:35.835
21	71	(Japan) Ayumu Sasaki	RW-Idrofoglia Racing GP	Kalex	1:35.859
22	95	(Netherlands) Collin Veijer	Red Bull KTM Ajo	Kalex	1:35.917
23	16	(United States) Joe Roberts	OnlyFans American Racing Team	Kalex	1:35.990
24	92	(Japan) Yuki Kunii	Idemitsu Honda Team Asia	Kalex	1:36.217
25	11	(Spain) Alex Escrig	Klint Forward Factory Team	Forward	1:36.948
26	99	(Spain) Adrián Huertas	Italtrans Racing Team	Kalex	1:36.948
OFFICIAL MOTO2 PRACTICE TIMES REPORT

=== Moto3 ===
==== Combined Practice 1-2 ====
Fastest session lap

Pos.	No.	Biker	Team	Constructor	Practice times	
Pos.	No.	Biker	Team	Constructor	P1	P2
1	66	(Australia) Joel Kelso	LEVELUP-MTA	KTM	1:41.287	**1:39.885**
2	31	(Spain) Adrián Fernández	Leopard Racing	Honda	**1:40.882**	1:40.026
3	83	(Spain) Álvaro Carpe	Red Bull KTM Ajo	KTM	1:42.085	1:40.085
4	22	(Spain) David Almansa	Leopard Racing	Honda	1:41.834	1:40.313
5	58	(Italy) Luca Lunetta	Sic58 Squadra Corse	Honda	1:41.727	1:40.408
6	71	(Italy) Dennis Foggia	CFMoto Gaviota Aspar Team	KTM	1:41.559	1:40.514
7	99	(Spain) José Antonio Rueda	Red Bull KTM Ajo	KTM	1:41.450	1:40.602
8	12	(Australia) Jacob Roulstone	Red Bull KTM Tech3	KTM	1:42.331	1:40.694
9	36	(Spain) Ángel Piqueras	Frinsa – MT Helmets – MSI	KTM	1:41.243	1:40.733
10	64	(Spain) David Muñoz	Liqui Moly Dynavolt Intact GP	KTM	1:41.446	1:40.805
11	28	(Spain) Máximo Quiles	CFMoto Gaviota Aspar Team	KTM	1:42.463	1:40.931
12	94	(Italy) Guido Pini	Liqui Moly Dynavolt Intact GP	KTM	1:41.578	1:40.985
13	6	(Japan) Ryusei Yamanaka	Frinsa – MT Helmets – MSI	KTM	1:41.000	1:41.061
14	73	(Argentina) Valentín Perrone	Red Bull KTM Tech3	KTM	1:42.377	1:41.032
15	19	(United Kingdom) Scott Ogden	CIP Green Power	KTM	1:41.962	1:41.073
16	10	(Italy) Nicola Carraro	Rivacold Snipers Team	Honda	1:41.914	1:41.117
17	32	(Spain) Vicente Pérez	LEVELUP-MTA	KTM	1:42.643	1:41.271
18	54	(Italy) Riccardo Rossi	Rivacold Snipers Team	Honda	1:43.312	1:41.436
19	14	(New Zealand) Cormac Buchanan	Denssi Racing – BOE	KTM	1:41.983	1:41.469
20	11	(Spain) Adrián Cruces	GRYD - Mlav Racing	KTM	1:43.719	1:41.474
21	5	(Thailand) Tatchakorn Buasri	Honda Team Asia	Honda	1:42.878	1:41.480
22	72	(Japan) Taiyo Furusato	Honda Team Asia	Honda	1:42.878	1:45.487
23	82	(Italy) Stefano Nepa	Sic58 Squadra Corse	Honda	1:42.986	1:41.715
24	55	(Switzerland) Noah Dettwiler	CIP Green Power	KTM	1:42.683	1:41.738
25	34	(Austria) Jakob Rosenthaler	Denssi Racing – BOE	KTM	1:43.699	1:42.366
26	8	(United Kingdom) Eddie O'Shea	GRYD - Mlav Racing	Honda	1:43.764	1:42.366
OFFICIAL MOTO3 FREE PRACTICE TIMES REPORT

==== Practice ====
The top 14 riders (written in bold) qualified for Q2.

Pos.	No.	Biker	Team	Constructor	Practice times
Pos.	No.	Biker	Team	Constructor	P1
1	64	(Spain) **David Muñoz**	**Liqui Moly Dynavolt Intact GP**	**KTM**	1:40.236
2	6	(Japan) **Ryusei Yamanaka**	**Frinsa – MT Helmets – MSI**	**KTM**	1:40.341
3	31	(Spain) **Adrián Fernández**	**Leopard Racing**	**Honda**	1:40.379
4	36	(Spain) **Ángel Piqueras**	**Frinsa – MT Helmets – MSI**	**KTM**	1:40.387
5	28	(Spain) **Máximo Quiles**	**CFMoto Gaviota Aspar Team**	**KTM**	1:40.475
6	94	(Italy) **Guido Pini**	**Liqui Moly Dynavolt Intact GP**	**KTM**	1:40.484
7	71	(Italy) **Dennis Foggia**	**CFMoto Gaviota Aspar Team**	**KTM**	1:40.553
8	72	(Japan) **Taiyo Furusato**	**Honda Team Asia**	**Honda**	1:40.570
9	99	(Spain) **José Antonio Rueda**	**Red Bull KTM Ajo**	**KTM**	1:40.592
10	19	(United Kingdom) **Scott Ogden**	**CIP Green Power**	**KTM**	1:40.592
11	83	(Spain) **Álvaro Carpe**	**Red Bull KTM Ajo**	**KTM**	1:40.604
12	66	(Australia) **Joel Kelso**	**LEVELUP-MTA**	**KTM**	1:40.618
13	22	(Spain) **David Almansa**	**Leopard Racing**	**Honda**	1:40.714
14	73	(Argentina) **Valentín Perrone**	**Red Bull KTM Tech3**	**KTM**	1:40.762
15	12	(Australia) Jacob Roulstone	Red Bull KTM Tech3	KTM	1:40.775
16	58	(Italy) Luca Lunetta	Sic58 Squadra Corse	Honda	1:40.781
17	32	(Spain) Vicente Pérez	LEVELUP-MTA	KTM	1:40.825
18	10	(Italy) Nicola Carraro	Rivacold Snipers Team	Honda	1:40.980
19	54	(Italy) Riccardo Rossi	Rivacold Snipers Team	Honda	1:41.042
20	5	(Thailand) Tatchakorn Buasri	Honda Team Asia	Honda	1:41.297
21	82	(Italy) Stefano Nepa	Sic58 Squadra Corse	Honda	1:41.527
22	14	(New Zealand) Cormac Buchanan	Denssi Racing – BOE	KTM	1:41.767
23	11	(Spain) Adrián Cruces	GRYD - Mlav Racing	KTM	1:42.277
24	55	(Switzerland) Noah Dettwiler	CIP Green Power	KTM	1:42.311
25	8	(United Kingdom) Eddie O'Shea	GRYD - Mlav Racing	Honda	1:42.426
26	34	(Austria) Jakob Rosenthaler	Denssi Racing – BOE	KTM	1:42.614
OFFICIAL MOTO3 PRACTICE TIMES REPORT

=== MotoE ===
==== Combined Practice 1-2 ====
The top 8 riders (written in bold) qualified for Q2.

Fastest session lap

Pos.	No.	Biker	Team	Constructor	Practice times	
Pos.	No.	Biker	Team	Constructor	P1	P2
1	40	(Italy) **Mattia Casadei**	**LCRE Team**	**Ducati**	**1:40.794**	**1:39.813**
2	51	(Brazil) **Eric Granado**	**LCRE Team**	**Ducati**	1:44.401	1:39.883
3	81	(Spain) **Jordi Torres**	**Power Electronics Aspar Team**	**Ducati**	1:41.663	1:40.181
4	99	(Spain) **Óscar Gutiérrez**	**MSI Racing Team**	**Ducati**	1:43.879	1:40.222
5	21	(Italy) **Kevin Zannoni**	**Power Electronics Aspar Team**	**Ducati**	1:42.211	1:40.407
6	61	(Italy) **Alessandro Zaccone**	**Aruba Cloud MotoE Team**	**Ducati**	1:41.730	1:40.417
7	7	(Italy) **Lorenzo Baldassarri**	**Dynavolt Intact GP**	**Ducati**	1:42.547	1:40.533
8	6	(Spain) **María Herrera**	**KLINT Forward Factory Team**	Ducati	1:42.091	1:40.644
9	11	(Italy) Matteo Ferrari	Felo Gresini MotoE	Ducati	1:41.640	1:40.644
10	29	(Italy) Nicholas Spinelli	Rivacold Snipers Team MotoE	Ducati	1:43.096	1:40.645
11	72	(Italy) Alessio Finello	Felo Gresini MotoE	Ducati	1:43.464	1:41.408
12	19	(San Marino) Luca Bernardi	Aruba Cloud MotoE Team	Ducati	1:44.138	1:41.595
13	9	(Italy) Andrea Mantovani	KLINT Forward Factory Team	Ducati	1:41.610	1:42.446
14	12	(Romania) Jacopo Hosciuc	MSI Racing Team	Ducati	1:43.433	1:41.904
15	47	(Hungary) Tibor Erik Varga	Rivacold Snipers Team MotoE	Ducati	1:43.879	1:42.126
16	77	(Italy) Raffaele Fusco	Ongetta SIC58 Squadra Corse	Ducati	1:44.097	1:42.422
17	28	(Italy) Tommaso Occhi	Ongetta SIC58 Squadra Corse	Ducati	1:47.623	1:43.140
NC	1	(Spain) Héctor Garzó	Dynavolt Intact GP	Ducati	1:42.051	DNS
OFFICIAL MOTOE PRACTICE TIMES REPORT

== Qualifying ==
=== MotoGP ===
Fastest session lap

Pos.	No.	Biker	Team	Constructor	Qualifying times		Final grid	Row
Pos.	No.	Biker	Team	Constructor	Q1	Q2	Final grid	Row
1	20	(France) Fabio Quartararo	Monster Energy Yamaha MotoGP Team	Yamaha	Qualified in Q2	1:29.324	1	1
2	93	(Spain) Marc Márquez	Ducati Lenovo Team	Ducati	Qualified in Q2	1:29.442	2	1
3	73	(Spain) Álex Márquez	BK8 Gresini Racing MotoGP	Ducati	Qualified in Q2	1:29.571	3	1
4	54	(Spain) Fermín Aldeguer	BK8 Gresini Racing MotoGP	Ducati	Qualified in Q2	1:29.776	4	2
5	12	(Spain) Maverick Viñales	Red Bull KTM Tech3	KTM	Qualified in Q2	1:30.023	5	2
6	63	(Italy) Francesco Bagnaia	Ducati Lenovo Team	Ducati	Qualified in Q2	1:30.047	6	2
7	72	(Italy) Marco Bezzecchi	Aprilia Racing	Aprilia	Qualified in Q2	1:30.183	7	3
8	43	(Australia) Jack Miller	Prima Pramac Yamaha MotoGP	Yamaha	Qualified in Q2	1:30.191	8	3
9	21	(Italy) Franco Morbidelli	Pertamina Enduro VR46 Racing Team	Ducati	Qualified in Q2	1:30.198	9	3
10	25	(Spain) Raúl Fernández	Trackhouse MotoGP Team	Aprilia	1:30.431	1:30.385	10	4
11	5	(France) Johann Zarco	Castrol Honda LCR	Honda	1:30.399	1:30.444	11	4
12	37	(Spain) Pedro Acosta	Red Bull KTM Factory Racing	KTM	Qualified in Q2	1:30.462	12	4
13	33	(South Africa) Brad Binder	Red Bull KTM Factory Racing	KTM	1:30.441	N/A	13	5
14	42	(Spain) Álex Rins	Monster Energy Yamaha MotoGP Team	Yamaha	1:30.455	N/A	14	5
15	36	(Spain) Joan Mir	Honda HRC Castrol	Honda	1:30.479	N/A	15	5
16	10	(Italy) Luca Marini	Honda HRC Castrol	Honda	1:30.505	N/A	16	6
17	49	(Italy) Fabio Di Giannantonio	Pertamina Enduro VR46 Racing Team	Ducati	1:30.651	N/A	17	6
18	23	(Italy) Enea Bastianini	Red Bull KTM Tech3	KTM	1:30.697	N/A	17	6
19	79	(Japan) Ai Ogura	Trackhouse MotoGP Team	Aprilia	1:31.576	N/A	19	7
20	88	(Portugal) Miguel Oliveira	Prima Pramac Yamaha MotoGP	Yamaha	1:31.782	N/A	20	7
21	32	(Spain) Lorenzo Savadori	Aprilia Racing	Aprilia	1:31.982	N/A	21	7
22	30	(Japan) Takaaki Nakagami	Honda HRC Test Team	Honda	1:32.544	N/A	22	8
OFFICIAL MOTOGP QUALIFYING TIMES REPORT

=== Moto2 ===
Fastest session lap

Pos.	No.	Biker	Team	Constructor	Qualifying times		Final grid	Row
Pos.	No.	Biker	Team	Constructor	P1	P2	Final grid	Row
1	18	(Spain) Manuel González	Liqui Moly Dynavolt Intact GP	Kalex	Qualified in Q2	1:34.315	1	1
2	7	(Belgium) Barry Baltus	Fantic Racing Lino Sonego	Kalex	1:34.894	1:34.642	2	1
3	10	(Brazil) Diogo Moreira	Italtrans Racing Team	Kalex	Qualified in Q2	1:34.654	3	1
4	75	(Spain) Albert Arenas	Italjet Gresini Moto2	Kalex	Qualified in Q2	1:34.660	4	2
5	44	(Spain) Arón Canet	Fantic Racing Lino Sonego	Kalex	Qualified in Q2	1:34.671	4	2
6	96	(United Kingdom) Jake Dixon	Elf Marc VDS Racing Team	Boscoscuro	Qualified in Q2	1:34.682	5	2
7	12	(Czech Republic) Filip Salač	Elf Marc VDS Racing Team	Boscoscuro	Qualified in Q2	1:34.711	7	3
8	21	(Spain) Alonso López	Folladore SpeedRS Team	Boscoscuro	Qualified in Q2	1:34.754	8	3
9	13	(Italy) Celestino Vietti	Folladore SpeedRS Team	Boscoscuro	Qualified in Q2	1:34.811	9	3
10	4	(Spain) Iván Ortolá	QJMotor – Frinsa – MSi	Boscoscuro	1:35.191	1:34.898	10	4
11	14	(Italy) Tony Arbolino	Blu Cru Pramac Yamaha Moto2	Boscoscuro	Qualified in Q2	1:34.919	11	4
12	80	(Colombia) David Alonso	CFMoto Gaviota Aspar Team	Kalex	1:34.946	1:34.936	12	4
13	53	(Turkey) Deniz Öncü	Red Bull KTM Ajo	Kalex	Qualified in Q2	1:34.983	13	5
14	81	(Australia) Senna Agius	Liqui Moly Dynavolt Intact GP	Kalex	Qualified in Q2	1:35.107	14	5
15	28	(Spain) Izan Guevara	Blu Cru Pramac Yamaha Moto2	Boscoscuro	Qualified in Q2	1:35.221	15	5
16	3	(Spain) Sergio García	QJMotor – Frinsa – MSi	Boscoscuro	Qualified in Q2	1:35.266	16	6
17	24	(Spain) Marcos Ramírez	OnlyFans American Racing Team	Kalex	1:35.182	1:35.343	17	6
18	9	(Spain) Jorge Navarro	Klint Forward Factory Team	Forward	Qualified in Q2	1:35.439	18	6
19	95	(Netherlands) Collin Veijer	Red Bull KTM Ajo	Kalex	1:35.218	N/A	19	7
20	84	(Netherlands) Zonta van den Goorbergh	RW-Idrofoglia Racing GP	Kalex	1:35.284	N/A	20	7
21	27	(Spain) Daniel Holgado	CFMoto Gaviota Aspar Team	Kalex	1:35.374	N/A	21	7
22	16	(United States) Joe Roberts	OnlyFans American Racing Team	Kalex	1:35.374	N/A	22	8
23	71	(Japan) Ayumu Sasaki	RW-Idrofoglia Racing GP	Kalex	1:35.490	N/A	23	8
24	99	(Spain) Adrián Huertas	Italtrans Racing Team	Kalex	1:35.513	N/A	24	8
25	92	(Japan) Yuki Kunii	Idemitsu Honda Team Asia	Kalex	1:35.879	N/A	25	9
26	17	(Spain) Daniel Muñoz	Klint Forward Factory Team	Forward	1:36.379	N/A	26	9
OFFICIAL MOTO2 QUALIFYING TIMES REPORT

=== Moto3 ===
Fastest session lap

Pos.	No.	Biker	Team	Constructor	Qualifying times		Final grid	Row
Pos.	No.	Biker	Team	Constructor	P1	P2	Final grid	Row
1	28	(Spain) Máximo Quiles	CFMoto Gaviota Aspar Team	KTM	Qualified in Q2	1:39.947	1	1
2	94	(Italy) Guido Pini	Liqui Moly Dynavolt Intact GP	KTM	Qualified in Q2	1:40.036	2	1
3	66	(Australia) Joel Kelso	LEVELUP-MTA	KTM	Qualified in Q2	1:40.045	3	1
4	36	(Spain) Ángel Piqueras	Frinsa – MT Helmets – MSI	KTM	Qualified in Q2	1:40.149	4	2
5	31	(Spain) Adrián Fernández	Leopard Racing	Honda	Qualified in Q2	1:40.351	5	2
6	64	(Spain) David Muñoz	Liqui Moly Dynavolt Intact GP	KTM	Qualified in Q2	1:40.358	6	2
7	73	(Argentina) Valentín Perrone	Red Bull KTM Tech3	KTM	Qualified in Q2	1:40.443	7	3
8	99	(Spain) José Antonio Rueda	Red Bull KTM Ajo	KTM	Qualified in Q2	1:40.477	8	3
9	22	(Spain) David Almansa	Leopard Racing	Honda	Qualified in Q2	1:40.480	9	3
10	10	(Italy) Nicola Carraro	Rivacold Snipers Team	Honda	1:41.483	1:40.594	10	4
11	72	(Japan) Taiyo Furusato	Honda Team Asia	Honda	Qualified in Q2	1:40.622	11	4
12	6	(Japan) Ryusei Yamanaka	Frinsa – MT Helmets – MSI	KTM	Qualified in Q2	1:40.624	12	4
13	83	(Spain) Álvaro Carpe	Red Bull KTM Ajo	KTM	Qualified in Q2	1:40.669	13	5
14	32	(Spain) Vicente Pérez	LEVELUP-MTA	KTM	1:41.225	1:40.729	14	5
15	71	(Italy) Dennis Foggia	CFMoto Gaviota Aspar Team	KTM	Qualified in Q2	1:40.763	15	5
16	58	(Italy) Luca Lunetta	Sic58 Squadra Corse	Honda	1:41.205	1:40.932	16	6
17	19	(United Kingdom) Scott Ogden	CIP Green Power	KTM	Qualified in Q2	1:41.173	17	6
18	12	(Australia) Jacob Roulstone	Red Bull KTM Tech3	KTM	1:41.201	1:41.363	18	6
19	14	(New Zealand) Cormac Buchanan	Denssi Racing – BOE	KTM	1:41.498	N/A	19	7
20	11	(Spain) Adrián Cruces	GRYD - Mlav Racing	KTM	1:41.796	N/A	20	7
21	82	(Italy) Stefano Nepa	Sic58 Squadra Corse	Honda	1:41.862	N/A	21	7
22	54	(Italy) Riccardo Rossi	Rivacold Snipers Team	Honda	1:41.913	N/A	22	8
23	5	(Thailand) Tatchakorn Buasri	Honda Team Asia	Honda	1:42.297	N/A	23	8
24	55	(Switzerland) Noah Dettwiler	CIP Green Power	KTM	1:42.543	N/A	24	8
25	34	(Austria) Jakob Rosenthaler	Denssi Racing – BOE	KTM	1:42.615	N/A	25	9
26	8	(United Kingdom) Eddie O'Shea	GRYD - Mlav Racing	Honda	No time	N/A	26	9
OFFICIAL MOTO3 QUALIFYING TIMES REPORT

=== MotoE ===
Fastest session lap

Pos.	No.	Biker	Team	Constructor	Qualifying times		Final grid	Row
Pos.	No.	Biker	Team	Constructor	P1	P2	Final grid	Row
1	61	(Italy) Alessandro Zaccone	Aruba Cloud MotoE Team	Ducati	Qualified in Q2	1:39.545	1	1
2	51	(Brazil) Eric Granado	LCRE Team	Ducati	Qualified in Q2	1:39.554	2	1
3	99	(Spain) Óscar Gutiérrez	MSI Racing Team	Ducati	Qualified in Q2	1:39.699	2	1
4	9	(Italy) Andrea Mantovani	KLINT Forward Factory Team	Ducati	1:40.219	1:39.825	4	2
5	21	(Italy) Kevin Zannoni	Power Electronics Aspar Team	Ducati	Qualified in Q2	1:39.888	5	2
6	81	(Spain) Jordi Torres	Power Electronics Aspar Team	Ducati	Qualified in Q2	1:40.069	6	2
7	11	(Italy) Matteo Ferrari	Felo Gresini MotoE	Ducati	1:40.079	1:40.121	7	3
8	7	(Italy) Lorenzo Baldassarri	Dynavolt Intact GP	Ducati	Qualified in Q2	1:40.425	8	3
9	6	(Spain) María Herrera	KLINT Forward Factory Team	Ducati	Qualified in Q2	1:40.464	9	3
NC	40	(Italy) Mattia Casadei	LCRE Team	Ducati	Qualified in Q2	N/A	10	4
11	29	(Italy) Nicholas Spinelli	Rivacold Snipers Team MotoE	Ducati	1:40.348	N/A	11	4
12	72	(Italy) Alessio Finello	Felo Gresini MotoE	Ducati	1:40.909	N/A	12	4
13	12	(Romania) Jacopo Hosciuc	MSI Racing Team	Ducati	1:41.366	N/A	13	5
14	19	(San Marino) Luca Bernardi	Aruba Cloud MotoE Team	Ducati	1:41.409	N/A	14	5
15	47	(Hungary) Tibor Erik Varga	Rivacold Snipers Team MotoE	Ducati	1:42.032	N/A	15	5
16	28	(Italy) Tommaso Occhi	Ongetta SIC58 Squadra Corse	Ducati	1:42.787	N/A	16	6
17	77	(Italy) Raffaele Fusco	Ongetta SIC58 Squadra Corse	Ducati	1:42.828	N/A	17	6
OFFICIAL MOTOE PRACTICE TIMES REPORT

== MotoGP Sprint ==
The MotoGP Sprint was held on 10 May 2025.

Pos.	No.	Rider	Team	Manufacturer	Laps	Time/Retired	Grid	Points
1	93	(Spain) Marc Márquez	Ducati Lenovo Team	Ducati	13	19:49.022	2	12
2	73	(Spain) Álex Márquez	BK8 Gresini Racing MotoGP	Ducati	13	+0.530	3	9
3	54	(Spain) Fermín Aldeguer	BK8 Gresini Racing MotoGP	Ducati	13	+2.164	4	7
4	20	(France) Fabio Quartararo	Monster Energy Yamaha MotoGP Team	Yamaha	13	+2.840	1	6
5	12	(Spain) Maverick Viñales	Red Bull KTM Tech3	KTM	13	+5.285	5	5
6	5	(France) Johann Zarco	Castrol Honda LCR	Honda	13	+7.939	11	4
7	49	(Italy) Fabio Di Giannantonio	Pertamina Enduro VR46 Racing Team	Ducati	13	+8.367	17	3
8	42	(Spain) Álex Rins	Monster Energy Yamaha MotoGP Team	Yamaha	13	+8.930	14	2
9	36	(Spain) Joan Mir	Honda HRC Castrol	Honda	13	+9.858	15	1
10	25	(Spain) Raúl Fernández	Trackhouse MotoGP Team	Aprilia	13	+11.599	10	
11	43	(Australia) Jack Miller	Prima Pramac Yamaha MotoGP	Yamaha	13	+12.238	8	
12	10	(Italy) Luca Marini	Honda HRC Castrol	Honda	13	+12.458	16	
13	23	(Italy) Enea Bastianini	Red Bull KTM Tech3	KTM	13	+12.540	17	
14	79	(Japan) Ai Ogura	Trackhouse MotoGP Team	Aprilia	13	+13.610	19	
15	21	(Italy) Franco Morbidelli	Pertamina Enduro VR46 Racing Team	Ducati	13	+13.752	9	
16	30	(Japan) Takaaki Nakagami	Honda HRC Test Team	Honda	13	+15.381	22	
17	72	(Italy) Marco Bezzecchi	Aprilia Racing	Aprilia	13	+15.904	7	
18	32	(Spain) Lorenzo Savadori	Aprilia Racing	Aprilia	13	+27.507	21	
19	37	(Spain) Pedro Acosta	Red Bull KTM Factory Racing	KTM	13	+28.342	12	
20	88	(Portugal) Miguel Oliveira	Prima Pramac Yamaha MotoGP	Yamaha	13	+44.807	20	
NC	33	(South Africa) Brad Binder	Red Bull KTM Factory Racing	KTM	4	Crashed out	13	
NC	63	(Italy) Francesco Bagnaia	Ducati Lenovo Team	Ducati	1	Crashed out	6	
Fastest sprint lap: (Spain) Fermín Aldeguer (Ducati) – 1:30.752 (lap 3)
OFFICIAL MOTOGP SPRINT REPORT

== Warm Up ==
=== Warm Up MotoGP ===
Pos.	No.	Biker	Team	Constructor	
Pos.	No.	Biker	Team	Constructor	Time results
1	36	(Spain) Joan Mir	Honda HRC Castrol	Honda	1:45.283
2	93	(Spain) Marc Márquez	Ducati Lenovo Team	Ducati	1:45.355
3	21	(Italy) Franco Morbidelli	Pertamina Enduro VR46 Racing Team	Ducati	1:45.523
4	5	(France) Johann Zarco	CASTROL Honda LCR	Honda	1:45.528
5	73	(Spain) Álex Márquez	BK8 Gresini Racing MotoGP	Ducati	1:45.588
6	37	(Spain) Pedro Acosta	Red Bull KTM Factory Racing	KTM	1:45.854
7	10	(Italy) Luca Marini	Honda HRC Castrol	Honda	1:45.867
8	33	(South Africa) Brad Binder	Red Bull KTM Factory Racing	KTM	1:45.891
9	43	(Australia) Jack Miller	Prima Pramac Yamaha MotoGP	Yamaha	1:45.926
10	72	(Italy) Marco Bezzecchi	Aprilia Racing	Aprilia	1:46.108
11	12	(Spain) Maverick Viñales	Red Bull KTM Tech3	KTM	1:46.535
12	30	(Japan) Takaaki Nakagami	Honda HRC Test Team	Honda	1:46.659
13	49	(Italy) Fabio Di Giannantonio	Pertamina Enduro VR46 Racing Team	Ducati	1:46.730
14	42	(Spain) Álex Rins	Monster Energy Yamaha MotoGP Team	Yamaha	1:46.894
15	20	(France) Fabio Quartararo	Monster Energy Yamaha MotoGP Team	Yamaha	1:46.947
16	88	(Portugal) Miguel Oliveira	Prima Pramac Yamaha MotoGP	Yamaha	1:47.067
17	23	(Italy) Enea Bastianini	Red Bull KTM Tech3	KTM	1:47.108
18	25	(Spain) Raúl Fernández	Trackhouse MotoGP Team	Aprilia	1:47.415
19	54	(Spain) Fermín Aldeguer	BK8 Gresini Racing MotoGP	Ducati	1:47.432
20	63	(Italy) Francesco Bagnaia	Ducati Lenovo Team	Ducati	1:48.039
21	32	(Italy) Lorenzo Savadori	Aprilia Racing	Aprilia	1:48.066
22	79	(Japan) Ai Ogura	Trackhouse MotoGP Team	Aprilia	1:50.919
OFFICIAL MOTOGP WARM UP TIMES REPORT

== Race ==
=== MotoGP ===
Pos.	No.	Rider	Team	Manufacturer	Laps	Time/Retired	Grid	Points
1	5	(France) Johann Zarco	CASTROL Honda LCR	Honda	26	45:47.541	11	25
2	93	(Spain) Marc Márquez	Ducati Lenovo Team	Ducati	26	+19.907	2	20
3	54	(Spain) Fermín Aldeguer	BK8 Gresini Racing MotoGP	Ducati	26	+26.532	4	16
4	37	(Spain) Pedro Acosta	Red Bull KTM Factory Racing	KTM	26	+29.631	12	13
5	12	(Spain) Maverick Viñales	Red Bull KTM Tech3	KTM	26	+38.136	5	11
6	30	(Japan) Takaaki Nakagami	Honda HRC Test Team	Honda	26	+59.527	22	10
7	25	(Spain) Raúl Fernández	Trackhouse MotoGP Team	Aprilia	26	+1'10.302	10	9
8	49	(Italy) Fabio Di Giannantonio	Pertamina Enduro VR46 Racing Team	Ducati	26	+1'10.363	17	8
9	32	(Italy) Lorenzo Savadori	Aprilia Racing	Aprilia	26	+1'25.793	21	7
10	79	(Japan) Ai Ogura	Trackhouse MotoGP Team	Aprilia	26	+1'26.529	19	6
11	10	(Italy) Luca Marini	Honda HRC Castrol	Honda	26	+1'32.535	16	5
12	42	(Spain) Álex Rins	Monster Energy Yamaha MotoGP Team	Yamaha	26	+1'35.357	14	4
13	23	(Italy) Enea Bastianini	Red Bull KTM Tech3	KTM	25	+1 lap	18	3
14	72	(Italy) Marco Bezzecchi	Aprilia Racing	Aprilia	25	+1 lap	7	2
15	21	(Italy) Franco Morbidelli	Pertamina Enduro VR46 Racing Team	Ducati	25	+1 lap	9	1
16	63	(Italy) Francesco Bagnaia	Ducati Lenovo Team	Ducati	25	+1 lap	6	
Ret	73	(Spain) Álex Márquez	BK8 Gresini Racing MotoGP	Ducati	22	Accident	3	
Ret	88	(Portugal) Miguel Oliveira	Prima Pramac Yamaha MotoGP	Yamaha	18	Accident	20	
Ret	33	(South Africa) Brad Binder	Red Bull KTM Factory Racing	KTM	6	Accident	13	
Ret	43	(Australia) Jack Miller	Prima Pramac Yamaha MotoGP	Yamaha	5	Accident	8	
Ret	20	(France) Fabio Quartararo	Monster Energy Yamaha MotoGP Team	Yamaha	3	Accident	1	
Ret	36	(Spain) Joan Mir	Honda HRC Castrol	Honda	0	Accident	15	
Fastest lap: (Spain) Álex Márquez (Ducati) - 1:34.187 (lap 3)
OFFICIAL MOTOGP RACE REPORT

=== Moto2 ===
Pos.	No.	Rider	Team	Manufacturer	Laps	Time/Retired	Grid	Points
1	18	(Spain) Manuel González	Liqui Moly Dynavolt Intact GP	Kalex	22	35:05.439	1	25
2	7	(Belgium) Barry Baltus	Fantic Racing Lino Sonego	Kalex	22	+1.811	2	20
3	44	(Spain) Arón Canet	Fantic Racing Lino Sonego	Kalex	22	+6.113	5	16
4	10	(Brazil) Diogo Moreira	Italtrans Racing Team	Kalex	22	+6.480	3	13
5	96	(United Kingdom) Jake Dixon	Elf Marc VDS Racing Team	Boscoscuro	22	+6.775	6	11
6	75	(Spain) Albert Arenas	Italjet Gresini Moto2	Kalex	22	+8.026	4	10
7	12	(Czech Republic) Filip Salač	Elf Marc VDS Racing Team	Boscoscuro	22	+8.681	7	9
8	13	(Italy) Celestino Vietti	Folladore SpeedRS Team	Boscoscuro	22	+9.393	9	8
9	4	(Spain) Iván Ortolá	QJMotor – Frinsa – MSi	Boscoscuro	22	+12.805	10	7
10	21	(Spain) Alonso López	Folladore SpeedRS Team	Boscoscuro	22	+13.071	8	6
11	80	(Colombia) David Alonso	CFMoto Gaviota Aspar Team	Kalex	22	+15.758	12	5
12	16	(United States) Joe Roberts	OnlyFans American Racing Team	Kalex	22	+17.369	22	4
13	3	(Spain) Sergio García	QJMotor – Frinsa – MSi	Boscoscuro	22	+17.578	16	3
14	81	(Australia) Senna Agius	Liqui Moly Dynavolt Intact GP	Kalex	22	+18.683	14	2
15	24	(Spain) Marcos Ramírez	OnlyFans American Racing Team	Kalex	22	+18.880	17	1
16	27	(Spain) Daniel Holgado	CFMoto Gaviota Aspar Team	Kalex	22	+24.212	21	
17	53	(Turkey) Deniz Öncü	Red Bull KTM Ajo	Kalex	22	+24.695	13	
18	99	(Spain) Adrián Huertas	Italtrans Racing Team	Kalex	22	+32.466	24	
19	84	(Netherlands) Zonta van den Goorbergh	RW-Idrofoglia Racing GP	Kalex	22	+32.639	20	
20	71	(Japan) Ayumu Sasaki	RW-Idrofoglia Racing GP	Kalex	22	+39.496	23	
21	17	(Spain) Daniel Muñoz	Klint Forward Factory Team	Forward	22	+46.559	26	
22	92	(Japan) Yuki Kunii	Idemitsu Honda Team Asia	Kalex	22	+47.032	25	
Ret	28	(Spain) Izan Guevara	Blu Cru Pramac Yamaha Moto2	Boscoscuro	18	Technical	15	
Ret	9	(Spain) Jorge Navarro	Klint Forward Factory Team	Forward	11	Crashed out	18	
Ret	14	(Italy) Tony Arbolino	Blu Cru Pramac Yamaha Moto2	Boscoscuro	2	Crashed out	11	
Ret	95	(Netherlands) Collin Veijer	Red Bull KTM Ajo	Kalex	0	Crashed out	19	
Fastest lap: (Belgium) Barry Baltus (Kalex) - 1:34.941 (lap 10)
OFFICIAL MOTO2 RACE REPORT

=== Moto3 ===
Pos.	No.	Rider	Team	Manufacturer	Laps	Time/Retired	Grid	Points
1	99	(Spain) José Antonio Rueda	Red Bull KTM Ajo	KTM	20	34:01.752	8	25
2	66	(Australia) Joel Kelso	LEVELUP-MTA	KTM	20	+0.636	3	20
3	64	(Spain) David Muñoz	Liqui Moly Dynavolt Intact GP	KTM	22	+0.124	6	16
4	83	(Spain) Álvaro Carpe	Red Bull KTM Ajo	KTM	20	+3.788	13	13
5	22	(Spain) David Almansa	Leopard Racing	Honda	20	+6.001	9	11
6	72	(Japan) Taiyo Furusato	Honda Team Asia	Honda	20	+6.343	11	10
7	28	(Spain) Máximo Quiles	CFMoto Gaviota Aspar Team	KTM	20	+6.521	1	9
8	31	(Spain) Adrián Fernández	Leopard Racing	Honda	20	+6.876	5	8
9	58	(Italy) Luca Lunetta	Sic58 Squadra Corse	Honda	20	+7.192	16	7
10	73	(Argentina) Valentín Perrone	Red Bull KTM Tech3	KTM	20	+7.241	7	6
11	71	(Italy) Dennis Foggia	CFMoto Gaviota Aspar Team	KTM	20	+8.574	15	5
12	19	(United Kingdom) Scott Ogden	CIP Green Power	KTM	20	+8.832	17	4
13	12	(Australia) Jacob Roulstone	Red Bull KTM Tech3	KTM	20	+12.153	18	3
14	14	(New Zealand) Cormac Buchanan	Denssi Racing – BOE	KTM	20	+12.257	19	2
15	10	(Italy) Nicola Carraro	Rivacold Snipers Team	Honda	20	+12.448	10	1
16	32	(Spain) Vicente Pérez	LEVELUP-MTA	KTM	20	+19.468	14	
17	94	(Italy) Guido Pini	Liqui Moly Dynavolt Intact GP	KTM	20	+29.799	2	
18	54	(Italy) Riccardo Rossi	Rivacold Snipers Team	Honda	20	+30.601	22	
19	5	(Thailand) Tatchakorn Buasri	Honda Team Asia	Honda	20	+30.738	23	
20	55	(Switzerland) Noah Dettwiler	CIP Green Power	KTM	20	+31.130	24	
21	34	(Austria) Jakob Rosenthaler	Denssi Racing – BOE	KTM	20	+1:26.153	25	
Ret	36	(Spain) Ángel Piqueras	Frinsa – MT Helmets – MSI	KTM	9	Crashed out	4	
Ret	11	(Spain) Adrián Cruces	GRYD - Mlav Racing	KTM	8	Crashed out	20	
Ret	82	(Italy) Stefano Nepa	Sic58 Squadra Corse	Honda	8	Technical	21	
Ret	8	(United Kingdom) Eddie O'Shea	GRYD - Mlav Racing	Honda	6	Crashed out	26	
Ret	6	(Japan) Ryusei Yamanaka	Frinsa – MT Helmets – MSI	KTM	1	Crashed out	12	
Fastest lap: (Spain) Álvaro Carpe (KTM) - 1:40.838 (lap 11)
OFFICIAL MOTO3 RACE REPORT

=== MotoE ===
==== Race 1 ====
Pos.	No.	Rider	Team	Manufacturer	Laps	Time/Retired	Grid	Points
1	99	(Spain) Óscar Gutiérrez	MSI Racing Team	Ducati	4	6:40.445	3	25
2	9	(Italy) Andrea Mantovani	KLINT Forward Factory Team	Ducati	4	+0.436	4	20
3	61	(Italy) Alessandro Zaccone	Aruba Cloud MotoE Team	Ducati	4	+1.661	1	16
4	21	(Italy) Kevin Zannoni	Power Electronics Aspar Team	Ducati	4	+2.288	5	13
5	40	(Italy) Mattia Casadei	LCRE Team	Ducati	4	+2.848	10	11
6	7	(Italy) Lorenzo Baldassarri	Dynavolt Intact GP	Ducati	4	+2.992	8	10
7	81	(Spain) Jordi Torres	Power Electronics Aspar Team	Ducati	4	+3.456	6	9
8	6	(Spain) María Herrera	KLINT Forward Factory Team	Ducati	4	+5.201	9	8
9	29	(Italy) Nicholas Spinelli	Rivacold Snipers Team MotoE	Ducati	4	+6.996	11	7
10	72	(Italy) Alessio Finello	Felo Gresini MotoE	Ducati	4	+8.395	12	6
11	12	(Romania) Jacopo Hosciuc	MSI Racing Team	Ducati	4	+10.829	13	5
12	47	(Hungary) Tibor Erik Varga	Rivacold Snipers Team MotoE	Ducati	4	+11.118	15	4
13	19	(San Marino) Luca Bernardi	Aruba Cloud MotoE Team	Ducati	4	+11.331	14	3
Ret	28	(Italy) Tommaso Occhi	Ongetta SIC58 Squadra Corse	Ducati	3	Crashed out	16	
Ret	11	(Italy) Matteo Ferrari	Felo Gresini MotoE	Ducati	1	Crashed out	7	
NC	51	(Brazil) Eric Granado	LCRE Team	Ducati	0	DNS	2	
NC	77	(Italy) Raffaele Fusco	Ongetta SIC58 Squadra Corse	Ducati	0	DNS	17	
OFFICIAL MOTOE RACE 1 REPORT

==== Race 2 ====
Pos.	No.	Rider	Team	Manufacturer	Laps	Time/Retired	Grid	Points
1	40	(Italy) Mattia Casadei	LCRE Team	Ducati	8	13:26.643	10	25
2	21	(Italy) Kevin Zannoni	Power Electronics Aspar Team	Ducati	8	+1.225	5	20
3	81	(Spain) Jordi Torres	Power Electronics Aspar Team	Ducati	8	+4.653	6	16
4	6	(Spain) María Herrera	KLINT Forward Factory Team	Ducati	8	+5.084	9	13
5	7	(Italy) Lorenzo Baldassarri	Dynavolt Intact GP	Ducati	8	+5.855	8	11
6	29	(Italy) Nicholas Spinelli	Rivacold Snipers Team MotoE	Ducati	8	+6.713	11	10
7	9	(Italy) Andrea Mantovani	KLINT Forward Factory Team	Ducati	8	+7.160	4	9
8	12	(Romania) Jacopo Hosciuc	MSI Racing Team	Ducati	8	+10.785	13	8
9	19	(San Marino) Luca Bernardi	Aruba Cloud MotoE Team	Ducati	8	+12.043	14	7
10	47	(Hungary) Tibor Erik Varga	Rivacold Snipers Team MotoE	Ducati	8	+12.170	15	6
11	72	(Italy) Alessio Finello	Felo Gresini MotoE	Ducati	8	+12.413	12	5
12	77	(Italy) Raffaele Fusco	Ongetta SIC58 Squadra Corse	Ducati	8	+31.014	17	4
13	28	(Italy) Tommaso Occhi	Ongetta SIC58 Squadra Corse	Ducati	8	+48.095	16	3
Ret	11	(Italy) Matteo Ferrari	Felo Gresini MotoE	Ducati	3	Crashed out	7	
Ret	99	(Spain) Óscar Gutiérrez	MSI Racing Team	Ducati	1	Crashed out	3	
Ret	61	(Italy) Alessandro Zaccone	Aruba Cloud MotoE Team	Ducati	1	Crashed out	1	
NC	51	(Brazil) Eric Granado	LCRE Team	Ducati	0	DNS	2	
OFFICIAL MOTOE RACE 2 REPORT

== Championship standings after the race ==
Below are the standings for the top five riders, constructors, and teams after the round.

=== MotoGP ===
Riders' Championship standings

	Pos.	Rider	Points
1	1	(Spain) Marc Márquez	171
1	2	(Spain) Álex Márquez	149
	3	(Italy) Francesco Bagnaia	120
	4	(Italy) Franco Morbidelli	85
	5	(Italy) Fabio Di Giannantonio	74

Constructors' Championship standings

	Pos.	Constructor	Points
	1	(Italy) Ducati	217
2	2	(Japan) Honda	85
	3	(Austria) KTM	76
2	4	(Japan) Yamaha	72
	5	(Italy) Aprilia	62

Teams' Championship standings

Pos.	Team	Points
1	(Italy) Ducati Lenovo Team	291
2	(Italy) BK8 Gresini Racing MotoGP	197
3	(Italy) Pertamina Enduro VR46 Racing Team	159
4	(Japan) Monster Energy Yamaha MotoGP Team	79
5	(Austria) Red Bull KTM Factory Racing	78

=== Moto2 ===
Riders' Championship standings

	Pos.	Rider	Points
	1	(Spain) Manuel González	111
	2	(Spain) Arón Canet	95
	3	(United Kingdom) Jake Dixon	77
	4	(Belgium) Barry Baltus	73
3	5	(Brazil) Diogo Moreira	50

Constructors' Championship standings

Pos.	Constructor	Points
1	(Germany) Kalex	133
2	(Italy) Boscoscuro	88
3	(Switzerland) Forward	10

Teams' Championship standings

	Pos.	Team	Points
	1	(Italy) Fantic Racing Lino Sonego	168
	2	(Germany) Liqui Moly Dynavolt Intact GP	150
	3	(Belgium) Elf Marc VDS Racing Team	105
	4	(Italy) Folladore SpeedRS Team	78
3	5	(Italy) Italtrans Racing Team	55

=== Moto3 ===
Riders' Championship standings

Pos.	Rider	Points
1	(Spain) José Antonio Rueda	116
2	(Spain) Ángel Piqueras	87
3	(Australia) Joel Kelso	77
4	(Spain) Adrián Fernández	61
5	(Japan) Taiyo Furusato	58

Constructors' Championship standings

Pos.	Constructor	Points
1	(Austria) KTM	150
2	(Japan) Honda	87

Teams' Championship standings

Pos.	Team	Points
1	(Finland) Red Bull KTM Ajo	172
2	(Spain) Frinsa – MT Helmets – MSi	121
3	(Italy) LevelUp – MTA	117
4	(Luxembourg) Leopard Racing	94
5	(Italy) Sic58 Squadra Corse	65

=== MotoE ===
Riders' Championship standings

Pos.	Rider	Points
1	(Italy) Mattia Casadei	36
2	(Italy) Kevin Zannoni	33
3	(Italy) Andrea Mantovani	29
4	(Spain) Oscar Gutiérrez	25
5	(Spain) Jordi Torres	25

Teams' Championship standings

Pos.	Team	Points
1	(Spain) Power Electronics Aspar Team	58
2	(Switzerland) Klint Forward Team	50
3	(Spain) MSi Racing Team	38
4	(Monaco) LCR E-Team	36
5	(Italy) Rivacold Snipers Team MotoE	27

Previous race: 2025 Spanish Grand Prix	FIM Grand Prix World Championship; 2025 season	Next race: 2025 British Grand Prix
Previous race: 2024 French Grand Prix	French motorcycle Grand Prix	Next race: 2026 French Grand Prix
