= 2008 Valencian Community motorcycle Grand Prix =

2008 Valencian Community Grand Prix
Race details
- Race 18 of 18 races in the 2008 Grand Prix motorcycle racing season
- Date: 26 October 2008
- Official name: Gran Premio Parts Europe de la Comunitat Valenciana
- Location: Circuit Ricardo Tormo
- Course: Permanent racing facility; 4.005 km (2.489 mi)

MotoGP
Pole position
- Rider: (Australia) Casey Stoner
- Time: 1:31.502
Fastest lap
- Rider: (Australia) Casey Stoner
- Time: 1:32.582
Podium
- First: (Australia) Casey Stoner
- Second: (Spain) Dani Pedrosa
- Third: (Italy) Valentino Rossi

250cc
Pole position
- Rider: (Italy) Marco Simoncelli
- Time: 1:35.408
Fastest lap
- Rider: (Finland) Mika Kallio
- Time: 1:35.890
Podium
- First: (Italy) Marco Simoncelli
- Second: (Japan) Yuki Takahashi
- Third: (Spain) Álvaro Bautista

125cc
Pole position
- Rider: (Hungary) Gábor Talmácsi
- Time: 1:41.451
Fastest lap
- Rider: (France) Mike Di Meglio
- Time: 1:40.901
Podium
- First: (Italy) Simone Corsi
- Second: (Spain) Nicolás Terol
- Third: (France) Mike Di Meglio

The 2008 Valencian Community motorcycle Grand Prix was the last round of the 2008 MotoGP championship. It took place on the weekend of 24–26 October 2008 at the Circuit Ricardo Tormo.

== MotoGP classification ==
Pos.	No.	Rider	Team	Manufacturer	Laps	Time/Retired	Grid	Points
1	1	(Australia) Casey Stoner	Ducati Marlboro Team	Ducati	30	46:46.114	1	25
2	2	(Spain) Dani Pedrosa	Repsol Honda Team	Honda	30	+3.390	2	20
3	46	(Italy) Valentino Rossi	Fiat Yamaha Team	Yamaha	30	+12.194	10	16
4	4	(Italy) Andrea Dovizioso	JiR Team Scot MotoGP	Honda	30	+24.159	9	13
5	69	(United States) Nicky Hayden	Repsol Honda Team	Honda	30	+26.232	3	11
6	5	(United States) Colin Edwards	Tech 3 Yamaha	Yamaha	30	+32.209	4	10
7	56	(Japan) Shinya Nakano	San Carlo Honda Gresini	Honda	30	+34.571	15	9
8	48	(Spain) Jorge Lorenzo	Fiat Yamaha Team	Yamaha	30	+35.661	7	8
9	65	(Italy) Loris Capirossi	Rizla Suzuki MotoGP	Suzuki	30	+38.228	8	7
10	15	(San Marino) Alex de Angelis	San Carlo Honda Gresini	Honda	30	+47.583	16	6
11	52	(United Kingdom) James Toseland	Tech 3 Yamaha	Yamaha	30	+52.107	5	5
12	50	(France) Sylvain Guintoli	Alice Team	Ducati	30	+52.350	13	4
13	7	(Australia) Chris Vermeulen	Rizla Suzuki MotoGP	Suzuki	30	+52.833	12	3
14	21	(United States) John Hopkins	Kawasaki Racing Team	Kawasaki	30	+53.227	14	2
15	14	(France) Randy de Puniet	LCR Honda MotoGP	Honda	30	+53.411	6	1
16	33	(Italy) Marco Melandri	Ducati Marlboro Team	Ducati	30	+1:08.387	18	
17	13	(Australia) Anthony West	Kawasaki Racing Team	Kawasaki	30	+1:11.181	17	
18	24	(Spain) Toni Elías	Alice Team	Ducati	30	+1:37.055	11	

== 250 cc classification ==
Pos.	No.	Rider	Manufacturer	Laps	Time/Retired	Grid	Points
1	58	(Italy) Marco Simoncelli	Gilera	27	43:29.003	1	25
2	72	(Japan) Yuki Takahashi	Honda	27	+5.164	10	20
3	19	(Spain) Álvaro Bautista	Aprilia	27	+8.648	6	16
4	15	(Italy) Roberto Locatelli	Gilera	27	+15.605	8	13
5	4	(Japan) Hiroshi Aoyama	KTM	27	+20.991	5	11
6	55	(Spain) Héctor Faubel	Aprilia	27	+22.212	9	10
7	41	(Spain) Aleix Espargaró	Aprilia	27	+23.199	12	9
8	14	(Thailand) Ratthapark Wilairot	Honda	27	+23.321	7	8
9	75	(Italy) Mattia Pasini	Aprilia	27	+37.424	14	7
10	12	(Switzerland) Thomas Lüthi	Aprilia	27	+38.887	11	6
11	36	(Finland) Mika Kallio	KTM	27	+44.065	4	5
12	25	(Italy) Alex Baldolini	Aprilia	27	+1:10.999	16	4
13	10	(Hungary) Imre Tóth	Aprilia	27	+1:31.950	18	3
14	92	(Spain) Daniel Arcas	Aprilia	27	+1:39.110	22	2
15	35	(Italy) Simone Grotzkyj	Gilera	27	+1:41.209	17	1
16	43	(Spain) Manuel Hernández	Aprilia	26	+1 lap	21	
17	17	(Czech Republic) Karel Abraham	Aprilia	26	+1 lap	20	
18	90	(Italy) Federico Sandi	Aprilia	26	+1 lap	19	
19	45	(Indonesia) Doni Tata Pradita	Yamaha	26	+1 lap	23	
Ret	93	(Hungary) Alen Győrfi	Aprilia	24	Accident	24	
Ret	6	(Spain) Alex Debón	Aprilia	21	Accident	2	
Ret	60	(Spain) Julián Simón	KTM	19	Retirement	3	
Ret	32	(Italy) Fabrizio Lai	Gilera	12	Accident	15	
Ret	52	(Czech Republic) Lukáš Pešek	Aprilia	11	Accident	13	
Ret	94	(Germany) Toni Wirsing	Honda	11	Retirement	25	
OFFICIAL 250cc REPORT

== 125 cc classification ==
Pos.	No.	Rider	Manufacturer	Laps	Time/Retired	Grid	Points
1	24	(Italy) Simone Corsi	Aprilia	24	40:45.715	3	25
2	18	(Spain) Nicolás Terol	Aprilia	24	+0.106	4	20
3	63	(France) Mike Di Meglio	Derbi	24	+0.223	7	16
4	38	(United Kingdom) Bradley Smith	Aprilia	24	+0.776	5	13
5	11	(Germany) Sandro Cortese	Aprilia	24	+1.333	11	11
6	29	(Italy) Andrea Iannone	Aprilia	24	+21.578	8	10
7	71	(Japan) Tomoyoshi Koyama	KTM	24	+29.387	15	9
8	45	(United Kingdom) Scott Redding	Aprilia	24	+29.419	17	8
9	22	(Spain) Pablo Nieto	KTM	24	+38.059	18	7
10	12	(Spain) Esteve Rabat	KTM	24	+38.481	12	6
11	8	(Italy) Lorenzo Zanetti	KTM	24	+38.941	16	5
12	7	(Spain) Efrén Vázquez	Aprilia	24	+48.466	22	4
13	40	(Italy) Lorenzo Savadori	Aprilia	24	+48.802	26	3
14	5	(France) Alexis Masbou	Loncin	24	+50.340	23	2
15	28	(Spain) Enrique Jerez	KTM	24	+50.575	27	1
16	73	(Japan) Takaaki Nakagami	Aprilia	24	+52.220	20	
17	34	(Switzerland) Randy Krummenacher	KTM	24	+55.047	21	
18	94	(Germany) Jonas Folger	KTM	24	+55.139	37	
19	16	(France) Jules Cluzel	Loncin	24	+55.546	25	
20	72	(Italy) Marco Ravaioli	Aprilia	24	+1:00.289	31	
21	95	(Romania) Robert Mureșan	Aprilia	24	+1:10.142	34	
22	48	(Switzerland) Bastien Chesaux	Aprilia	24	+1:26.165	39	
23	69	(France) Louis Rossi	Honda	24	+1:26.407	35	
24	78	(Spain) Daniel Sáez	Aprilia	24	+1:41.720	33	
25	25	(Spain) Cristian Trabalón	Aprilia	23	+1 lap	40	
DSQ	23	(Spain) Julián Miralles	Aprilia	22	(+2 laps)	29	
Ret	30	(Spain) Pere Tutusaus	Aprilia	23	Retirement	36	
Ret	51	(United States) Stevie Bonsey	Aprilia	15	Accident	6	
Ret	6	(Spain) Joan Olivé	Derbi	14	Retirement	14	
Ret	26	(Spain) Adrián Martín	Aprilia	11	Accident	24	
Ret	35	(Italy) Raffaele De Rosa	KTM	8	Accident	19	
Ret	1	(Hungary) Gábor Talmácsi	Aprilia	6	Accident	1	
Ret	99	(United Kingdom) Danny Webb	Aprilia	6	Accident	13	
Ret	21	(Germany) Robin Lässer	Aprilia	6	Accident	32	
Ret	77	(Switzerland) Dominique Aegerter	Derbi	3	Retirement	9	
Ret	33	(Spain) Sergio Gadea	Aprilia	2	Accident	2	
Ret	17	(Germany) Stefan Bradl	Aprilia	2	Accident	10	
Ret	56	(Netherlands) Hugo van den Berg	Aprilia	0	Accident	38	
Ret	75	(Spain) Ricard Cardús	Derbi	0	Accident	28	
DNS	44	(Spain) Pol Espargaró	Derbi	0	Not started	30	
OFFICIAL 125cc REPORT

== Championship standings after the race (MotoGP) ==
Below are the standings for the top five riders and constructors after round eighteen has concluded.

Riders' Championship standings

Pos.	Rider	Points
1	(Italy) Valentino Rossi	373
2	(Australia) Casey Stoner	280
3	(Spain) Dani Pedrosa	249
4	(Spain) Jorge Lorenzo	190
5	(Italy) Andrea Dovizioso	174

Constructors' Championship standings

Pos.	Constructor	Points
1	(Japan) Yamaha	402
2	(Italy) Ducati	321
3	(Japan) Honda	315
4	(Japan) Suzuki	181
5	(Japan) Kawasaki	88

- Note: Only the top five positions are included for both sets of standings.

Previous race: 2008 Malaysian Grand Prix	FIM Grand Prix World Championship; 2008 season	Next race: 2009 Qatar Grand Prix
Previous race: 2007 Valencian Grand Prix	Valencian Community motorcycle Grand Prix	Next race: 2009 Valencian Grand Prix
