= 2008 Dutch TT =

(Netherlands) 2008 Dutch Grand Prix
Race details
- Race 9 of 18 races in the 2008 Grand Prix motorcycle racing season
- Date: 28 June 2008
- Official name: A-Style TT Assen
- Location: TT Circuit Assen
- Course: Permanent racing facility; 4.555 km (2.830 mi)

MotoGP
Pole position
- Rider: (Australia) Casey Stoner
- Time: 1:35.520
Fastest lap
- Rider: (Australia) Casey Stoner
- Time: 1:36.738
Podium
- First: (Australia) Casey Stoner
- Second: (Spain) Dani Pedrosa
- Third: (United States) Colin Edwards

250cc
Pole position
- Rider: (Spain) Álvaro Bautista
- Time: 1:39.510
Fastest lap
- Rider: (Spain) Álvaro Bautista
- Time: 1:40.340
Podium
- First: (Spain) Álvaro Bautista
- Second: (Switzerland) Thomas Lüthi
- Third: (Italy) Marco Simoncelli

125cc
Pole position
- Rider: (Italy) Simone Corsi
- Time: 1:45.533
Fastest lap
- Rider: (France) Mike Di Meglio
- Time: 1:46.661
Podium
- First: (Hungary) Gábor Talmácsi
- Second: (Spain) Joan Olivé
- Third: (Italy) Simone Corsi

The 2008 Dutch TT was the ninth round of the 2008 MotoGP championship. It took place on the weekend of 26–28 June 2008 at the TT Circuit Assen.

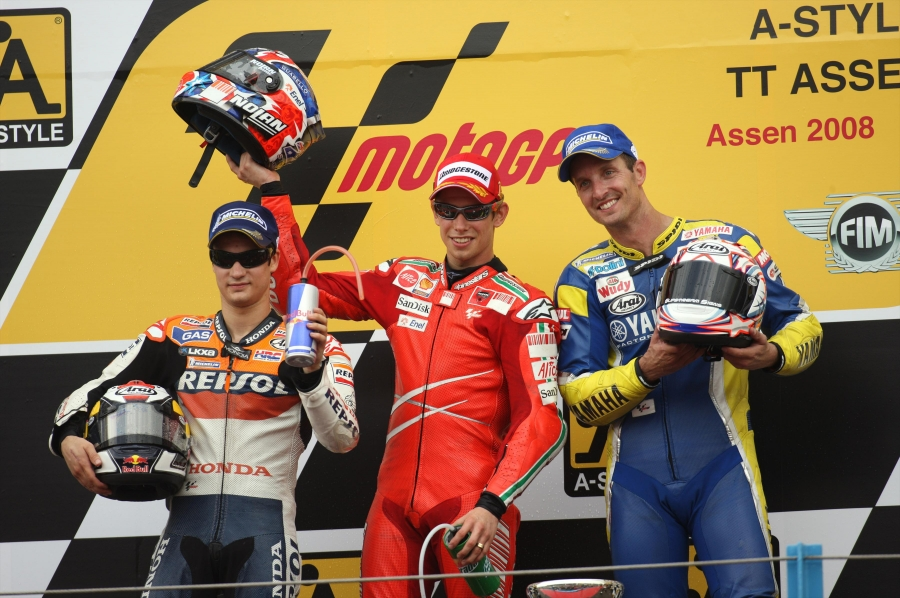
Dani Pedrosa, Casey Stoner and Colin Edwards, celebrating on the podium after finishing second, first and third at the MotoGP race.

== MotoGP classification ==
Pos.	No.	Rider	Team	Manufacturer	Laps	Time/Retired	Grid	Points
1	1	(Australia) Casey Stoner	Ducati Marlboro Team	Ducati	26	42:12.337	1	25
2	2	(Spain) Dani Pedrosa	Repsol Honda Team	Honda	26	+11.310	2	20
3	5	(United States) Colin Edwards	Tech 3 Yamaha	Yamaha	26	+17.125	6	16
4	69	(United States) Nicky Hayden	Repsol Honda Team	Honda	26	+20.477	4	13
5	4	(Italy) Andrea Dovizioso	JiR Team Scot MotoGP	Honda	26	+27.346	11	11
6	48	(Spain) Jorge Lorenzo	Fiat Yamaha Team	Yamaha	26	+28.608	7	10
7	7	(Australia) Chris Vermeulen	Rizla Suzuki MotoGP	Suzuki	26	+32.330	8	9
8	56	(Japan) Shinya Nakano	San Carlo Honda Gresini	Honda	26	+34.892	9	8
9	52	(United Kingdom) James Toseland	Tech 3 Yamaha	Yamaha	26	+38.566	13	7
10	50	(France) Sylvain Guintoli	Alice Team	Ducati	26	+38.817	10	6
11	46	(Italy) Valentino Rossi	Fiat Yamaha Team	Yamaha	26	+46.025	3	5
12	24	(Spain) Toni Elías	Alice Team	Ducati	26	+48.213	14	4
13	33	(Italy) Marco Melandri	Ducati Marlboro Team	Ducati	26	+59.594	16	3
Ret	13	(Australia) Anthony West	Kawasaki Racing Team	Kawasaki	7	Accident	15	
Ret	14	(France) Randy de Puniet	LCR Honda MotoGP	Honda	0	Accident	5	
Ret	15	(San Marino) Alex de Angelis	San Carlo Honda Gresini	Honda	0	Accident	12	
DNS	21	(United States) John Hopkins	Kawasaki Racing Team	Kawasaki		Did not start		
WD	65	(Italy) Loris Capirossi	Rizla Suzuki MotoGP	Suzuki		Withdrew		

== 250 cc classification ==
Pos.	No.	Rider	Manufacturer	Laps	Time/Retired	Grid	Points
1	19	(Spain) Álvaro Bautista	Aprilia	24	40:54.117	1	25
2	12	(Switzerland) Thomas Lüthi	Aprilia	24	+4.597	6	20
3	58	(Italy) Marco Simoncelli	Gilera	24	+6.003	3	16
4	6	(Spain) Alex Debón	Aprilia	24	+9.034	4	13
5	21	(Spain) Héctor Barberá	Aprilia	24	+9.079	2	11
6	4	(Japan) Hiroshi Aoyama	KTM	24	+11.515	13	10
7	36	(Finland) Mika Kallio	KTM	24	+12.874	11	9
8	72	(Japan) Yuki Takahashi	Honda	24	+13.622	10	8
9	15	(Italy) Roberto Locatelli	Gilera	24	+21.168	9	7
10	60	(Spain) Julián Simón	KTM	24	+28.789	7	6
11	55	(Spain) Héctor Faubel	Aprilia	24	+37.607	15	5
12	14	(Thailand) Ratthapark Wilairot	Honda	24	+37.741	17	4
13	32	(Italy) Fabrizio Lai	Gilera	24	+38.729	12	3
14	25	(Italy) Alex Baldolini	Aprilia	24	+39.165	19	2
15	52	(Czech Republic) Lukáš Pešek	Aprilia	24	+43.037	8	1
16	50	(Republic of Ireland) Eugene Laverty	Aprilia	24	+54.171	20	
17	41	(Spain) Aleix Espargaró	Aprilia	24	+54.334	5	
18	64	(Sweden) Frederik Watz	Aprilia	24	+1:24.430	22	
19	45	(Indonesia) Doni Tata Pradita	Yamaha	23	+1 lap	24	
20	10	(Hungary) Imre Tóth	Aprilia	23	+1 lap	21	
Ret	54	(San Marino) Manuel Poggiali	Gilera	17	Retirement	16	
Ret	75	(Italy) Mattia Pasini	Aprilia	11	Accident	14	
Ret	7	(Spain) Russell Gómez	Aprilia	0	Accident	23	
DNS	17	(Czech Republic) Karel Abraham	Aprilia	0	Did not start	18	
OFFICIAL 250cc REPORT

== 125 cc classification ==
The 125cc race was stopped after 9 laps due to rain. It was later restarted for 5 additional laps, with the grid determined by the running order before the suspension. The second part of the race determined the final result.

Pos.	No.	Rider	Manufacturer	Laps	Time/Retired	Grid	Points
1	1	(Hungary) Gábor Talmácsi	Aprilia	5	9:04.520	13	25
2	6	(Spain) Joan Olivé	Derbi	5	+0.128	3	20
3	24	(Italy) Simone Corsi	Aprilia	5	+0.255	1	16
4	11	(Germany) Sandro Cortese	Aprilia	5	+0.340	5	13
5	38	(United Kingdom) Bradley Smith	Aprilia	5	+0.425	2	11
6	12	(Spain) Esteve Rabat	KTM	5	+0.568	15	10
7	63	(France) Mike Di Meglio	Derbi	5	+0.846	4	9
8	29	(Italy) Andrea Iannone	Aprilia	5	+0.928	23	8
9	18	(Spain) Nicolás Terol	Aprilia	5	+1.438	8	7
10	35	(Italy) Raffaele De Rosa	KTM	5	+2.554	7	6
11	27	(Italy) Stefano Bianco	Aprilia	5	+2.829	14	5
12	17	(Germany) Stefan Bradl	Aprilia	5	+3.021	10	4
13	71	(Japan) Tomoyoshi Koyama	KTM	5	+3.201	17	3
14	60	(Austria) Michael Ranseder	Aprilia	5	+3.600	21	2
15	56	(Netherlands) Hugo van den Berg	Aprilia	5	+4.547	25	1
16	77	(Switzerland) Dominique Aegerter	Derbi	5	+4.592	12	
17	51	(United States) Stevie Bonsey	Aprilia	5	+4.819	16	
18	16	(France) Jules Cluzel	Loncin	5	+10.548	27	
19	34	(Switzerland) Randy Krummenacher	KTM	5	+10.643	11	
20	22	(Spain) Pablo Nieto	KTM	5	+10.849	20	
21	30	(Spain) Pere Tutusaus	Aprilia	5	+11.094	24	
22	21	(Germany) Robin Lässer	Aprilia	5	+11.854	33	
23	5	(France) Alexis Masbou	Loncin	5	+13.716	29	
24	69	(France) Louis Rossi	Honda	5	+13.828	34	
25	95	(Romania) Robert Mureșan	Aprilia	5	+16.155	30	
26	82	(Netherlands) Michael van der Mark	Honda	5	+18.201	32	
27	84	(Sweden) Robert Gull	Derbi	5	+25.692	37	
28	81	(Netherlands) Jasper Iwema	Seel	5	+29.208	36	
29	89	(Netherlands) Ernst Dubbink	Honda	5	+29.949	35	
30	83	(Netherlands) Jerry van de Bunt	Aprilia	5	+36.419	38	
Ret	73	(Japan) Takaaki Nakagami	Aprilia	3	Accident	26	
Ret	8	(Italy) Lorenzo Zanetti	KTM	3	Accident	19	
Ret	7	(Spain) Efrén Vázquez	Aprilia	0	Did not start second race	22	
Ret	93	(Spain) Marc Márquez	KTM	0	Did not start second race	18	
Ret	45	(United Kingdom) Scott Redding	Aprilia	0	Did not start second race	6	
Ret	19	(Italy) Roberto Lacalendola	Aprilia	0	Did not start second race	31	
Ret	33	(Spain) Sergio Gadea	Aprilia	0	Did not finish first race	9	
Ret	80	(Netherlands) Joey Litjens	Seel	0	Did not finish first race	28	
OFFICIAL 125cc REPORT

== Championship standings after the race (MotoGP) ==
Below are the standings for the top five riders and constructors after round nine has concluded.

Riders' Championship standings

Pos.	Rider	Points
1	(Spain) Dani Pedrosa	171
2	(Italy) Valentino Rossi	167
3	(Australia) Casey Stoner	142
4	(Spain) Jorge Lorenzo	114
5	(United States) Colin Edwards	98

Constructors' Championship standings

Pos.	Constructor	Points
1	(Japan) Yamaha	196
2	(Japan) Honda	171
3	(Italy) Ducati	147
4	(Japan) Suzuki	80
5	(Japan) Kawasaki	41

- Note: Only the top five positions are included for both sets of standings.

Previous race: 2008 British Grand Prix	FIM Grand Prix World Championship; 2008 season	Next race: 2008 German Grand Prix
Previous race: 2007 Dutch TT	Dutch TT	Next race: 2009 Dutch TT
