= 2008 Spanish motorcycle Grand Prix =

(Spain) 2008 Spanish Grand Prix
Race details
- Race 2 of 18 races in the 2008 Grand Prix motorcycle racing season
- Date: 30 March 2008
- Official name: Gran Premio bwin.com de España
- Location: Circuito de Jerez
- Course: Permanent racing facility; 4.423 km (2.748 mi)

MotoGP
Pole position
- Rider: (Spain) Jorge Lorenzo
- Time: 1:38.189
Fastest lap
- Rider: (Spain) Dani Pedrosa
- Time: 1:40.116
Podium
- First: (Spain) Dani Pedrosa
- Second: (Italy) Valentino Rossi
- Third: (Spain) Jorge Lorenzo

250cc
Pole position
- Rider: (Spain) Álvaro Bautista
- Time: 1:43.071
Fastest lap
- Rider: (Italy) Marco Simoncelli
- Time: 1:43.546
Podium
- First: (Finland) Mika Kallio
- Second: (Italy) Mattia Pasini
- Third: (Japan) Yuki Takahashi

125cc
Pole position
- Rider: (United Kingdom) Bradley Smith
- Time: 1:47.587
Fastest lap
- Rider: (Italy) Simone Corsi
- Time: 1:47.999
Podium
- First: (Italy) Simone Corsi
- Second: (Spain) Nicolás Terol
- Third: (United Kingdom) Bradley Smith

The 2008 Spanish motorcycle Grand Prix was the second round of the 2008 MotoGP championship. It took place on the weekend of 28–30 March 2008 at the Circuito de Jerez located in Jerez de la Frontera, Spain. The MotoGP race was won by Dani Pedrosa, who finished ahead of Jorge Lorenzo, who started on pole position. Mika Kallio won the 250cc race after Álvaro Bautista and Marco Simoncelli, the two leaders, collided on the last lap. The 125cc race was won by Simone Corsi, ahead of Nicolás Terol and Bradley Smith, who started the race in pole position.

== MotoGP classification ==
Pos.	No.	Rider	Team	Manufacturer	Laps	Time/Retired	Grid	Points
1	2	(Spain) Dani Pedrosa	Repsol Honda Team	Honda	27	45:35.121	2	25
2	46	(Italy) Valentino Rossi	Fiat Yamaha Team	Yamaha	27	+2.883	5	20
3	48	(Spain) Jorge Lorenzo	Fiat Yamaha Team	Yamaha	27	+4.339	1	16
4	69	(United States) Nicky Hayden	Repsol Honda Team	Honda	27	+10.142	4	13
5	65	(Italy) Loris Capirossi	Rizla Suzuki MotoGP	Suzuki	27	+27.524	10	11
6	52	(United Kingdom) James Toseland	Tech 3 Yamaha	Yamaha	27	+27.808	8	10
7	21	(United States) John Hopkins	Kawasaki Racing Team	Kawasaki	27	+28.296	9	9
8	4	(Italy) Andrea Dovizioso	JiR Team Scot MotoGP	Honda	27	+28.449	13	8
9	56	(Japan) Shinya Nakano	San Carlo Honda Gresini	Honda	27	+32.569	11	7
10	7	(Australia) Chris Vermeulen	Rizla Suzuki MotoGP	Suzuki	27	+35.091	12	6
11	1	(Australia) Casey Stoner	Ducati Marlboro Team	Ducati	27	+42.223	7	5
12	33	(Italy) Marco Melandri	Ducati Marlboro Team	Ducati	27	+44.498	18	4
13	13	(Australia) Anthony West	Kawasaki Racing Team	Kawasaki	27	+45.807	15	3
14	15	(San Marino) Alex de Angelis	San Carlo Honda Gresini	Honda	27	+45.871	14	2
15	24	(Spain) Toni Elías	Alice Team	Ducati	27	+1:09.558	16	1
16	50	(France) Sylvain Guintoli	Alice Team	Ducati	27	+1:14.442	17	
Ret	5	(United States) Colin Edwards	Tech 3 Yamaha	Yamaha	5	Retirement	3	
Ret	14	(France) Randy de Puniet	LCR Honda MotoGP	Honda	2	Accident	6	

== 250cc classification ==
Pos.	No.	Rider	Manufacturer	Laps	Time/Retired	Grid	Points
1	36	(Finland) Mika Kallio	KTM	26	45:27.908	2	25
2	75	(Italy) Mattia Pasini	Aprilia	26	+4.277	10	20
3	72	(Japan) Yuki Takahashi	Honda	26	+4.287	11	16
4	4	(Japan) Hiroshi Aoyama	KTM	26	+4.876	6	13
5	21	(Spain) Héctor Barberá	Aprilia	26	+5.968	7	11
6	6	(Spain) Alex Debón	Aprilia	26	+13.633	3	10
7	60	(Spain) Julián Simón	KTM	26	+16.372	5	9
8	15	(Italy) Roberto Locatelli	Gilera	26	+22.571	8	8
9	41	(Spain) Aleix Espargaró	Aprilia	26	+28.606	15	7
10	52	(Czech Republic) Lukáš Pešek	Aprilia	26	+32.726	17	6
11	25	(Italy) Alex Baldolini	Aprilia	26	+38.602	16	5
12	14	(Thailand) Ratthapark Wilairot	Honda	26	+43.371	19	4
13	17	(Czech Republic) Karel Abraham	Aprilia	26	+54.159	14	3
14	43	(Spain) Manuel Hernández	Aprilia	26	+1:21.938	21	2
15	10	(Hungary) Imre Tóth	Aprilia	25	+1 lap	22	1
16	45	(Indonesia) Doni Tata Pradita	Yamaha	25	+1 lap	23	
Ret	19	(Spain) Álvaro Bautista	Aprilia	25	Accident	1	
Ret	58	(Italy) Marco Simoncelli	Gilera	25	Accident	9	
Ret	12	(Switzerland) Thomas Lüthi	Aprilia	22	Accident	4	
Ret	54	(San Marino) Manuel Poggiali	Gilera	20	Retirement	18	
Ret	32	(Italy) Fabrizio Lai	Gilera	17	Retirement	12	
Ret	50	(Republic of Ireland) Eugene Laverty	Aprilia	8	Retirement	20	
Ret	55	(Spain) Héctor Faubel	Aprilia	2	Accident	13	
OFFICIAL 250cc REPORT

== 125cc classification ==
Pos.	No.	Rider	Manufacturer	Laps	Time/Retired	Grid	Points
1	24	(Italy) Simone Corsi	Aprilia	23	41:46.100	5	25
2	18	(Spain) Nicolás Terol	Aprilia	23	+3.206	2	20
3	38	(United Kingdom) Bradley Smith	Aprilia	23	+4.986	1	16
4	17	(Germany) Stefan Bradl	Aprilia	23	+5.022	3	13
5	22	(Spain) Pablo Nieto	KTM	23	+6.254	13	11
6	51	(United States) Stevie Bonsey	Aprilia	23	+20.563	6	10
7	45	(United Kingdom) Scott Redding	Aprilia	23	+22.517	8	9
8	77	(Switzerland) Dominique Aegerter	Derbi	23	+23.002	11	8
9	63	(France) Mike Di Meglio	Derbi	23	+23.928	7	7
10	11	(Germany) Sandro Cortese	Aprilia	23	+33.541	15	6
11	35	(Italy) Raffaele De Rosa	KTM	23	+33.664	10	5
12	12	(Spain) Esteve Rabat	KTM	23	+33.987	16	4
13	71	(Japan) Tomoyoshi Koyama	KTM	23	+34.426	21	3
14	44	(Spain) Pol Espargaró	Derbi	23	+40.038	17	2
15	73	(Japan) Takaaki Nakagami	Aprilia	23	+44.515	19	1
16	60	(Austria) Michael Ranseder	Aprilia	23	+45.498	24	
17	16	(France) Jules Cluzel	Loncin	23	+49.685	27	
18	29	(Italy) Andrea Iannone	Aprilia	23	+53.186	20	
19	30	(Spain) Pere Tutusaus	Aprilia	23	+58.037	25	
20	19	(Italy) Roberto Lacalendola	Aprilia	23	+1:03.610	28	
21	5	(France) Alexis Masbou	Loncin	23	+1:04.732	26	
22	76	(Spain) Iván Maestro	Honda	23	+1:19.599	34	
23	78	(Spain) Daniel Sáez	Aprilia	23	+1:24.990	32	
24	69	(France) Louis Rossi	Honda	23	+1:39.735	33	
25	79	(Spain) Alberto Moncayo	Derbi	23	+1:48.192	35	
26	95	(Romania) Robert Mureșan	Aprilia	20	+3 laps	29	
Ret	14	(Spain) Axel Pons	Aprilia	22	Accident	23	
Ret	8	(Italy) Lorenzo Zanetti	KTM	14	Accident	31	
Ret	56	(Netherlands) Hugo van den Berg	Aprilia	12	Retirement	30	
Ret	6	(Spain) Joan Olivé	Derbi	9	Accident	18	
Ret	99	(United Kingdom) Danny Webb	Aprilia	8	Accident	9	
Ret	27	(Italy) Stefano Bianco	Aprilia	7	Accident	14	
Ret	33	(Spain) Sergio Gadea	Aprilia	6	Accident	12	
Ret	7	(Spain) Efrén Vázquez	Aprilia	6	Accident	22	
Ret	1	(Hungary) Gábor Talmácsi	Aprilia	3	Retirement	4	
DNS	21	(Germany) Robin Lässer	Aprilia		Did not start		
WD	34	(Switzerland) Randy Krummenacher	KTM		Withdrew		
WD	93	(Spain) Marc Márquez	KTM		Withdrew		
OFFICIAL 125cc REPORT

== Championship standings after the race (MotoGP) ==
Below are the standings for the top five riders and constructors after round two has concluded.

Riders' Championship standings

Pos.	Rider	Points
1	(Spain) Dani Pedrosa	41
2	(Spain) Jorge Lorenzo	36
3	(Italy) Valentino Rossi	31
4	(Australia) Casey Stoner	30
5	(Italy) Andrea Dovizioso	21

Constructors' Championship standings

Pos.	Constructor	Points
1	(Japan) Honda	41
2	(Japan) Yamaha	40
3	(Italy) Ducati	30
4	(Japan) Suzuki	19
5	(Japan) Kawasaki	13

- Note: Only the top five positions are included for both sets of standings.

Previous race: 2008 Qatar Grand Prix	FIM Grand Prix World Championship; 2008 season	Next race: 2008 Portuguese Grand Prix
Previous race: 2007 Spanish Grand Prix	Spanish motorcycle Grand Prix	Next race: 2009 Spanish Grand Prix
