= 2008 Qatar motorcycle Grand Prix =

2008 Qatar Grand Prix
Race details
- Race 1 of 18 races in the 2008 Grand Prix motorcycle racing season
- Date: 9 March 2008
- Official name: Commercialbank Grand Prix of Qatar
- Location: Losail International Circuit
- Course: Permanent racing facility; 5.380 km (3.343 mi)

MotoGP
Pole position
- Rider: (Spain) Jorge Lorenzo
- Time: 1:53.927
Fastest lap
- Rider: (Australia) Casey Stoner
- Time: 1:55.153
Podium
- First: (Australia) Casey Stoner
- Second: (Spain) Jorge Lorenzo
- Third: (Spain) Dani Pedrosa

250cc
Pole position
- Rider: (Spain) Alex Debón
- Time: 1:59.470
Fastest lap
- Rider: (Spain) Alex Debón
- Time: 1:59.379
Podium
- First: (Italy) Mattia Pasini
- Second: (Spain) Héctor Barberá
- Third: (Finland) Mika Kallio

125cc
Pole position
- Rider: (United Kingdom) Bradley Smith
- Time: 2:05.242
Fastest lap
- Rider: (United Kingdom) Scott Redding
- Time: 2:05.695
Podium
- First: (Spain) Sergio Gadea
- Second: (Spain) Joan Olivé
- Third: (Germany) Stefan Bradl

The 2008 Qatar motorcycle Grand Prix was the opening round of the 2008 MotoGP championship. It took place on the weekend of 7–9 March 2008 at the Losail International Circuit located in Doha, Qatar. The race was historic in that it was the first one to be run at night, with the MotoGP race getting underway at 23:00 local time. Rookies Lorenzo and Toseland started their season strong with Lorenzo getting pole position and Toseland in 2nd during qualifying.

== MotoGP classification ==
| Pos. | No. | Rider | Team | Manufacturer | Laps | Time/Retired | Grid | Points |
|---|---|---|---|---|---|---|---|---|
| 1 | 1 | (Australia) Casey Stoner | Ducati Marlboro Team | Ducati | 22 | 42:36.587 | 4 | 25 |
| 2 | 48 | (Spain) Jorge Lorenzo | Fiat Yamaha Team | Yamaha | 22 | +5.323 | 1 | 20 |
| 3 | 2 | (Spain) Dani Pedrosa | Repsol Honda Team | Honda | 22 | +10.600 | 8 | 16 |
| 4 | 4 | (Italy) Andrea Dovizioso | JiR Team Scot MotoGP | Honda | 22 | +13.288 | 9 | 13 |
| 5 | 46 | (Italy) Valentino Rossi | Fiat Yamaha Team | Yamaha | 22 | +13.305 | 7 | 11 |
| 6 | 52 | (United Kingdom) James Toseland | Tech 3 Yamaha | Yamaha | 22 | +14.040 | 2 | 10 |
| 7 | 5 | (United States) Colin Edwards | Tech 3 Yamaha | Yamaha | 22 | +15.150 | 3 | 9 |
| 8 | 65 | (Italy) Loris Capirossi | Rizla Suzuki MotoGP | Suzuki | 22 | +32.505 | 13 | 8 |
| 9 | 14 | (France) Randy de Puniet | LCR Honda MotoGP | Honda | 22 | +33.003 | 5 | 7 |
| 10 | 69 | (United States) Nicky Hayden | Repsol Honda Team | Honda | 22 | +38.354 | 6 | 6 |
| 11 | 33 | (Italy) Marco Melandri | Ducati Marlboro Team | Ducati | 22 | +44.284 | 16 | 5 |
| 12 | 21 | (United States) John Hopkins | Kawasaki Racing Team | Kawasaki | 22 | +49.857 | 10 | 4 |
| 13 | 56 | (Japan) Shinya Nakano | San Carlo Honda Gresini | Honda | 22 | +49.871 | 15 | 3 |
| 14 | 24 | (Spain) Toni Elías | Alice Team | Ducati | 22 | +58.532 | 14 | 2 |
| 15 | 50 | (France) Sylvain Guintoli | Alice Team | Ducati | 22 | +58.930 | 17 | 1 |
| 16 | 13 | (Australia) Anthony West | Kawasaki Racing Team | Kawasaki | 22 | +1:05.643 | 18 | |
| 17 | 7 | (Australia) Chris Vermeulen | Rizla Suzuki MotoGP | Suzuki | 21 | +1 lap | 11 | |
| Ret | 15 | (San Marino) Alex de Angelis | San Carlo Honda Gresini | Honda | 16 | Accident | 12 | |

== 250 cc classification ==
| Pos. | No. | Rider | Manufacturer | Laps | Time/Retired | Grid | Points |
|---|---|---|---|---|---|---|---|
| 1 | 75 | (Italy) Mattia Pasini | Aprilia | 20 | 40:16.202 | 5 | 25 |
| 2 | 21 | (Spain) Héctor Barberá | Aprilia | 20 | +0.557 | 2 | 20 |
| 3 | 36 | (Finland) Mika Kallio | KTM | 20 | +1.029 | 4 | 16 |
| 4 | 6 | (Spain) Alex Debón | Aprilia | 20 | +1.418 | 1 | 13 |
| 5 | 72 | (Japan) Yuki Takahashi | Honda | 20 | +12.944 | 7 | 11 |
| 6 | 19 | (Spain) Álvaro Bautista | Aprilia | 20 | +14.480 | 3 | 10 |
| 7 | 17 | (Czech Republic) Karel Abraham | Aprilia | 20 | +16.721 | 11 | 9 |
| 8 | 15 | (Italy) Roberto Locatelli | Gilera | 20 | +18.987 | 9 | 8 |
| 9 | 41 | (Spain) Aleix Espargaró | Aprilia | 20 | +32.232 | 8 | 7 |
| 10 | 55 | (Spain) Héctor Faubel | Aprilia | 20 | +41.102 | 15 | 6 |
| 11 | 60 | (Spain) Julián Simón | KTM | 20 | +41.457 | 14 | 5 |
| 12 | 32 | (Italy) Fabrizio Lai | Gilera | 20 | +41.694 | 13 | 4 |
| 13 | 14 | (Thailand) Ratthapark Wilairot | Honda | 20 | +43.192 | 19 | 3 |
| 14 | 54 | (San Marino) Manuel Poggiali | Gilera | 20 | +44.228 | 18 | 2 |
| 15 | 12 | (Switzerland) Thomas Lüthi | Aprilia | 20 | +48.760 | 10 | 1 |
| 16 | 4 | (Japan) Hiroshi Aoyama | KTM | 20 | +1:11.031 | 12 | |
| 17 | 45 | (Indonesia) Doni Tata Pradita | Yamaha | 20 | +2:05.461 | 23 | |
| Ret | 25 | (Italy) Alex Baldolini | Aprilia | 14 | Retirement | 17 | |
| Ret | 52 | (Czech Republic) Lukáš Pešek | Aprilia | 12 | Accident | 16 | |
| Ret | 58 | (Italy) Marco Simoncelli | Gilera | 7 | Accident | 6 | |
| Ret | 10 | (Hungary) Imre Tóth | Aprilia | 4 | Retirement | 22 | |
| Ret | 43 | (Spain) Manuel Hernández | Aprilia | 0 | Accident | 21 | |
| Ret | 50 | (Republic of Ireland) Eugene Laverty | Aprilia | 0 | Accident | 20 | |
OFFICIAL 250cc REPORT

== 125 cc classification ==
| Pos. | No. | Rider | Manufacturer | Laps | Time/Retired | Grid | Points |
|---|---|---|---|---|---|---|---|
| 1 | 33 | (Spain) Sergio Gadea | Aprilia | 18 | 38:09.444 | 8 | 25 |
| 2 | 6 | (Spain) Joan Olivé | Derbi | 18 | +0.932 | 9 | 20 |
| 3 | 17 | (Germany) Stefan Bradl | Aprilia | 18 | +1.660 | 15 | 16 |
| 4 | 63 | (France) Mike Di Meglio | Derbi | 18 | +1.771 | 3 | 13 |
| 5 | 45 | (United Kingdom) Scott Redding | Aprilia | 18 | +1.819 | 4 | 11 |
| 6 | 99 | (United Kingdom) Danny Webb | Aprilia | 18 | +7.689 | 5 | 10 |
| 7 | 24 | (Italy) Simone Corsi | Aprilia | 18 | +8.684 | 10 | 9 |
| 8 | 44 | (Spain) Pol Espargaró | Derbi | 18 | +8.693 | 18 | 8 |
| 9 | 7 | (Spain) Efrén Vázquez | Aprilia | 18 | +9.054 | 19 | 7 |
| 10 | 18 | (Spain) Nicolás Terol | Aprilia | 18 | +10.902 | 7 | 6 |
| 11 | 11 | (Germany) Sandro Cortese | Aprilia | 18 | +10.945 | 13 | 5 |
| 12 | 1 | (Hungary) Gábor Talmácsi | Aprilia | 18 | +12.618 | 2 | 4 |
| 13 | 27 | (Italy) Stefano Bianco | Aprilia | 18 | +12.709 | 12 | 3 |
| 14 | 29 | (Italy) Andrea Iannone | Aprilia | 18 | +20.086 | 17 | 2 |
| 15 | 60 | (Austria) Michael Ranseder | Aprilia | 18 | +23.575 | 22 | 1 |
| 16 | 38 | (United Kingdom) Bradley Smith | Aprilia | 18 | +23.890 | 1 | |
| 17 | 77 | (Switzerland) Dominique Aegerter | Derbi | 18 | +29.406 | 20 | |
| 18 | 22 | (Spain) Pablo Nieto | KTM | 18 | +32.891 | 16 | |
| 19 | 73 | (Japan) Takaaki Nakagami | Aprilia | 18 | +33.346 | 23 | |
| 20 | 30 | (Spain) Pere Tutusaus | Aprilia | 18 | +33.649 | 26 | |
| 21 | 8 | (Italy) Lorenzo Zanetti | KTM | 18 | +36.696 | 24 | |
| 22 | 34 | (Switzerland) Randy Krummenacher | KTM | 18 | +36.754 | 25 | |
| 23 | 21 | (Germany) Robin Lässer | Aprilia | 18 | +45.317 | 27 | |
| 24 | 12 | (Spain) Esteve Rabat | KTM | 18 | +56.440 | 11 | |
| 25 | 69 | (France) Louis Rossi | Honda | 18 | +1:14.502 | 34 | |
| Ret | 35 | (Italy) Raffaele De Rosa | KTM | 15 | Accident | 6 | |
| Ret | 13 | (Italy) Dino Lombardi | Aprilia | 11 | Retirement | 32 | |
| Ret | 56 | (Netherlands) Hugo van den Berg | Aprilia | 10 | Accident | 29 | |
| Ret | 71 | (Japan) Tomoyoshi Koyama | KTM | 8 | Accident | 21 | |
| Ret | 51 | (United States) Stevie Bonsey | Aprilia | 5 | Accident | 14 | |
| Ret | 16 | (France) Jules Cluzel | Loncin | 4 | Accident | 30 | |
| Ret | 5 | (France) Alexis Masbou | Loncin | 1 | Retirement | 28 | |
| Ret | 19 | (Italy) Roberto Lacalendola | Aprilia | 1 | Retirement | 33 | |
| Ret | 95 | (Romania) Robert Mureșan | Aprilia | 0 | Retirement | 31 | |
OFFICIAL 125cc REPORT

== Championship standings after the race (MotoGP) ==
Below are the standings for the top five riders and constructors after round one has concluded.

Riders' Championship standings

| Pos. | Rider | Points |
|---|---|---|
| 1 | (Australia) Casey Stoner | 25 |
| 2 | (Spain) Jorge Lorenzo | 20 |
| 3 | (Spain) Dani Pedrosa | 16 |
| 4 | (Italy) Andrea Dovizioso | 13 |
| 5 | (Italy) Valentino Rossi | 11 |

Constructors' Championship standings

| Pos. | Constructor | Points |
|---|---|---|
| 1 | (Italy) Ducati | 25 |
| 2 | (Japan) Yamaha | 20 |
| 3 | (Japan) Honda | 16 |
| 4 | (Japan) Suzuki | 8 |
| 5 | (Japan) Kawasaki | 4 |

- Note: Only the top five positions are included for both sets of standings.

| Previous race: 2007 Valencian Grand Prix | FIM Grand Prix World Championship; 2008 season | Next race: 2008 Spanish Grand Prix |
| Previous race: 2007 Qatar Grand Prix | Qatar motorcycle Grand Prix | Next race: 2009 Qatar Grand Prix |
