= Iori Namihira =

Japanese motorcycle racer

- Nationality: Japanese
- Born: 12 December 1983 (age 42); Okayama, Japan
Motorcycle racing career statistics
125cc World Championship
Active years	2006–2008
Manufacturers	Honda
Starts / Wins / Podiums / Poles / F. laps / Points; 3 / 0 / 0 / 0 / 0 / 0

Iori Namihira (浪平 伊織, Namihira Iori; born 12 December 1983) is a Japanese motorcycle racer.

== Career statistics ==
=== Grand Prix motorcycle racing ===
==== By season ====
Season	Class	Motorcycle	Team	Race	Win	Podium	Pole	FLap	Pts	Plcd
2006	125cc	Honda	Honda Suzuka Racing	1	0	0	0	0	0	NC
2007	125cc	Honda	Honda Suzuka Racing	1	0	0	0	0	0	NC
2008	125cc	Honda	Honda Suzuka Racing	1	0	0	0	0	0	NC
Total				3	0	0	0	0	0	

==== Races by year ====
(key)

Year	Class	Bike	1	2	3	4	5	6	7	8	9	10	11	12	13	14	15	16	17	Pos.	Pts
2006	125cc	Honda	SPA	QAT	TUR	CHN	FRA	ITA	CAT	NED	GBR	GER	CZE	MAL	AUS	JPN; 31	POR	VAL		NC	0
2007	125cc	Honda	QAT	SPA	TUR	CHN	FRA	ITA	CAT	GBR	NED	GER	CZE	RSM	POR	JPN; Ret	AUS	MAL	VAL	NC	0
2008	125cc	Honda	QAT	SPA	POR	CHN	FRA	ITA	CAT	GBR	NED	GER	CZE	RSM	INP	JPN; Ret	AUS	MAL	VAL	NC	0
