= Takumi Endoh =

Japanese motorcycle racer

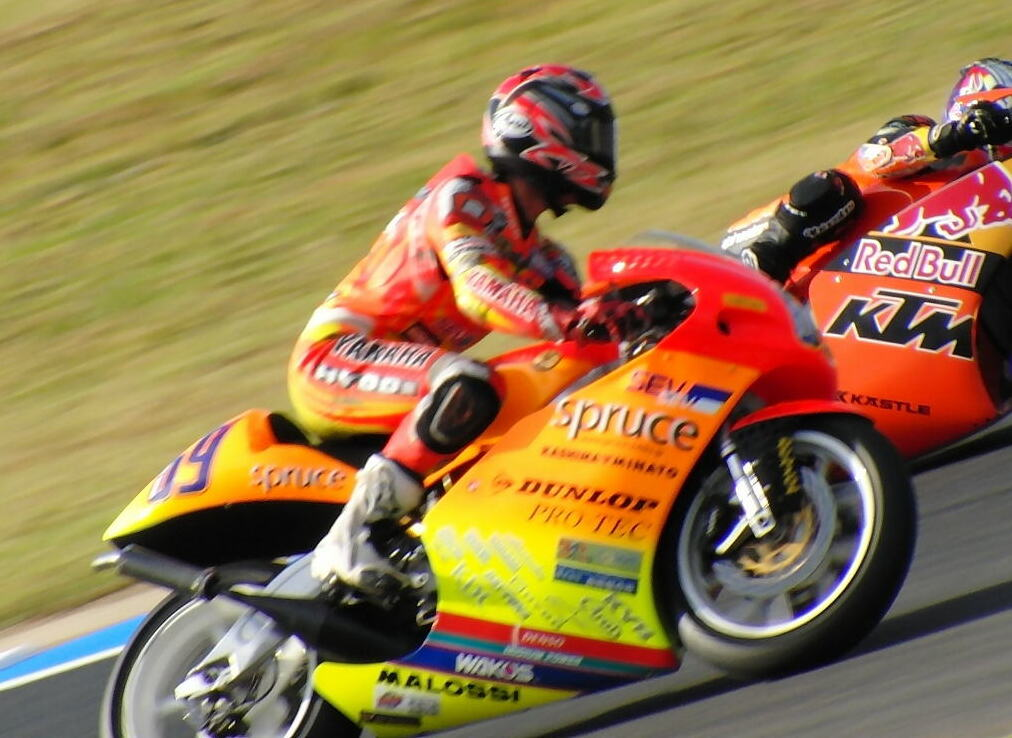
- Endoh at the 2008 Japanese Grand Prix
- Nationality: Japanese
- Born: 7 June 1984 (age 42); Niigata, Japan
Motorcycle racing career statistics
250cc World Championship
Active years	2008
Manufacturers	Yamaha
Starts / Wins / Podiums / Poles / F. laps / Points; 1 / 0 / 0 / 0 / 0 / 0

Takumi Endoh (遠藤 卓実, Endō Takumi; born 7 June 1984) is a Japanese motorcycle racer.

== Career statistics ==
=== Grand Prix motorcycle racing ===
==== By season ====
Season	Class	Motorcycle	Team	Number	Race	Win	Podium	Pole	FLap	Pts	Plcd
2008	250cc	Yamaha	Ser.Spruce/Pro-Tec	69	1	0	0	0	0	0	NC
Total					1	0	0	0	0	0	

==== Races by year ====
(key)

Year	Class	Bike	1	2	3	4	5	6	7	8	9	10	11	12	13	14	15	16	17	Pos.	Pts
2008	250cc	Yamaha	QAT	SPA	POR	CHN	FRA	ITA	CAT	GBR	NED	GER	CZE	RSM	INP	JPN; 21	AUS	MAL	VAL	NC	0
