= Luke Hinton =

British motorcycle racer

- Nationality: British
- Born: 1 May 1990 (age 36); Royal Leamington Spa, England

Luke Hinton is a Grand Prix motorcycle racer from Great Britain.

== Career statistics ==
=== By season ===
Season	Class	Motorcycle	Team	Number	Race	Win	Podium	Pole	FLap	Pts	Plcd
2008	125cc	Honda	Buildbase/Knotts	65	1	0	0	0	0	0	NC
Total					1	0	0	0	0	0	

=== Races by year ===
Year	Class	Bike	1	2	3	4	5	6	7	8	9	10	11	12	13	14	15	16	17	Pos	Points
2008	125cc	Honda	QAT	SPA	POR	CHN	FRA	ITA	CAT	GBR; Ret	NED	GER	CZE	RSM	INP	JPN	AUS	MAL	VAL	NC	0
