= Andrea Toušková =

Czech motorcycle racer

- Nationality: Czech
- Born: 26 September 1992 (age 34); Děčín, Czech Republic
- Current team: Unsigned
- Bike number: -
Motorcycle racing career statistics
125cc World Championship
Active years	2008
Manufacturers	Honda
Starts / Wins / Podiums / Poles / F. laps / Points; 1 / 0 / 0 / 0 / 0 / 0

Andrea Toušková (born 26 September 1992) is a Czech diplomat and a former Grand Prix motorcycle racer from Czech Republic. Before her current posting at the political section of the Czech Embassy in Washington, DC, she has served at the Czech Embassy in Dakar, Senegal where she was responsible for political and consular affairs, and has also been associated with the Ministry’s Security Policy Department. Toušková has specialized in African affairs and transatlantic security issues.

In sport, Toušková earlier competed in Grand Prix motorcycle racing, making her one of the few Czech women to participate at that level.

== Career statistics ==
=== By season ===
Season	Class	Motorcycle	Team	Number	Race	Win	Podium	Pole	FLap	Pts	Plcd
2008	125cc	Honda	Eurowag Junior Racing	98	1	0	0	0	0	0	NC
2010	125cc	Honda	Moto 82	49	0	0	0	0	0	0	NC
Total					1	0	0	0	0	0	

==== Races by year ====
Year	Class	Bike	1	2	3	4	5	6	7	8	9	10	11	12	13	14	15	16	17	Pos.	Pts
2008	125cc	Honda	QAT	SPA	POR	CHN	FRA	ITA	CAT	GBR	NED	GER	CZE; 31	RSM	INP	JPN	AUS	MAL	VAL	NC	0
2010	125cc	Honda	QAT	SPA	FRA	ITA	GBR	NED	CAT	GER	CZE; DNQ	INP	RSM	ARA	JPN	MAL	AUS	POR	VAL	NC	0
