= Tobias Siegert =

German motorcycle racer

- Nationality: German
- Born: 26 May 1991 (age 35); Nuremberg, Germany

Tobias Siegert is a Grand Prix motorcycle racer from Germany.

== Career statistics ==
=== By season ===
Season	Class	Motorcycle	Team	Number	Race	Win	Podium	Pole	FLap	Pts	Plcd
2007	125cc	Aprilia	ADAC Nordbayern e.V.	41	1	0	0	0	0	0	NC
2008	125cc	Aprilia	ADAC Nordbayern e.V.	41	2	0	0	0	0	0	NC
Total					3	0	0	0	0	0	

==== Races by year ====
(key)

Year	Class	Bike	1	2	3	4	5	6	7	8	9	10	11	12	13	14	15	16	17	Pos.	Pts
2007	125cc	Aprilia	QAT	SPA	TUR; 27	CHN	FRA	ITA; DNS	CAT	GBR	NED	GER	CZE	RSM	POR	JPN	AUS	MAL	VAL	NC	0
2008	125cc	Aprilia	QAT	SPA	POR	CHN	FRA; Ret	ITA	CAT	GBR	NED	GER; 24	CZE	RSM	INP	JPN	AUS	MAL	VAL	NC	0
