= 2008 Grand Prix motorcycle racing season =

Sports season

2008 F.I.M. Grand Prix motorcycle racing season

Seasons
- ← 2007 2009 →

2008 World Champions

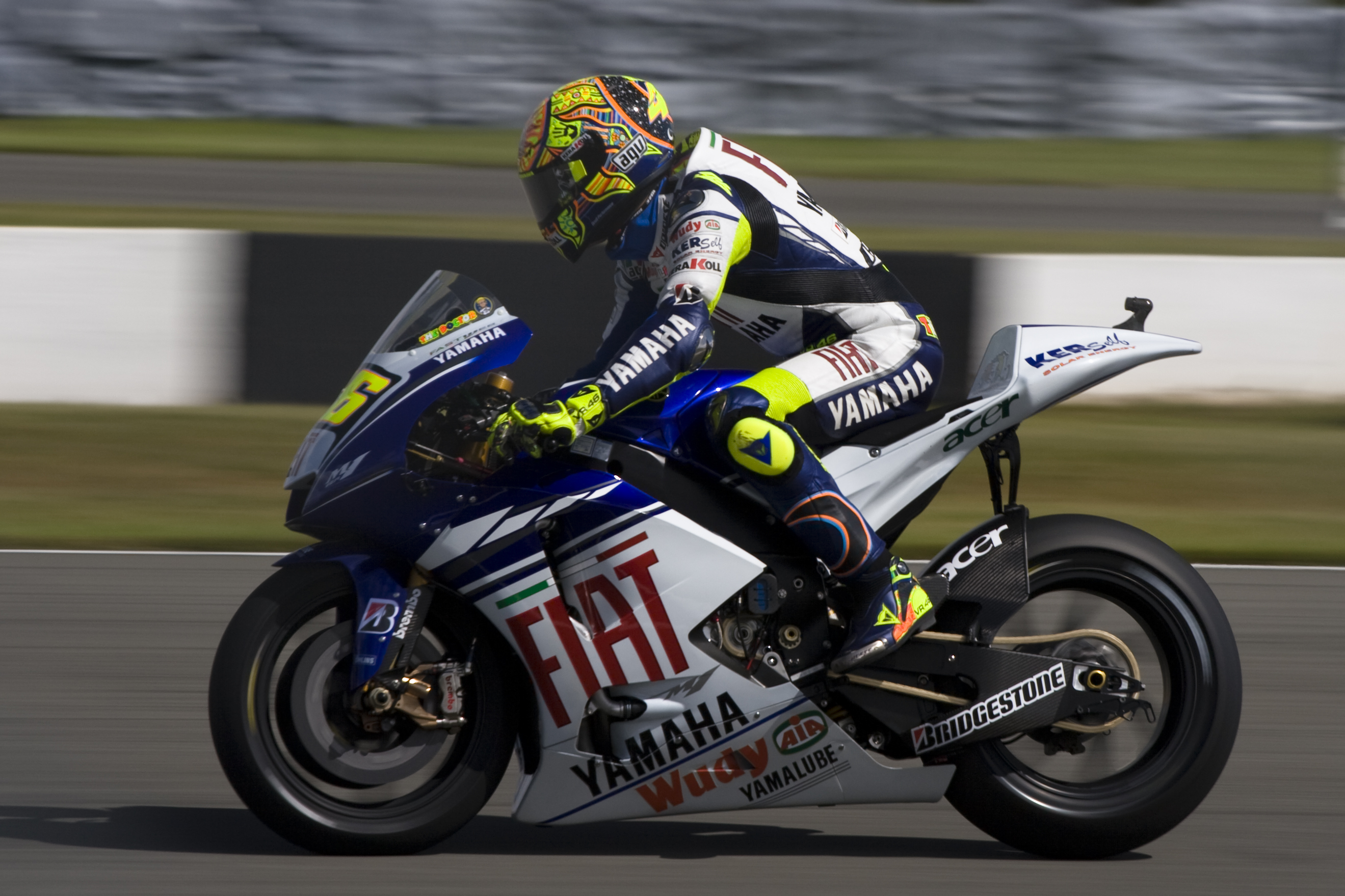
Valentino Rossi became the MotoGP World Champion

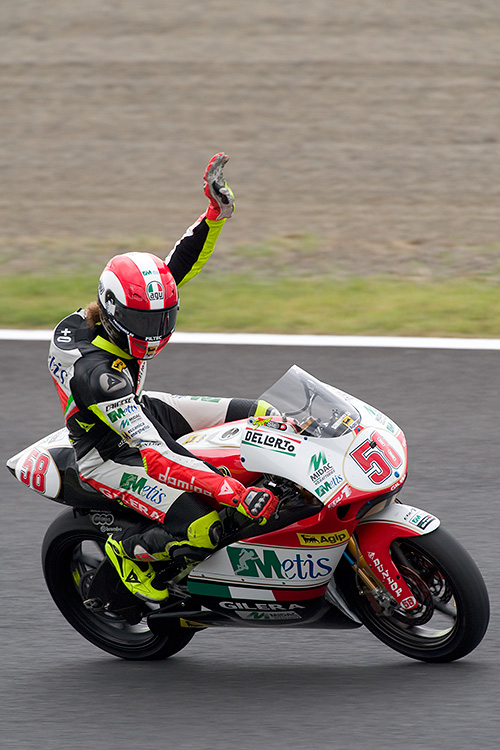
Marco Simoncelli became the 250cc World Champion

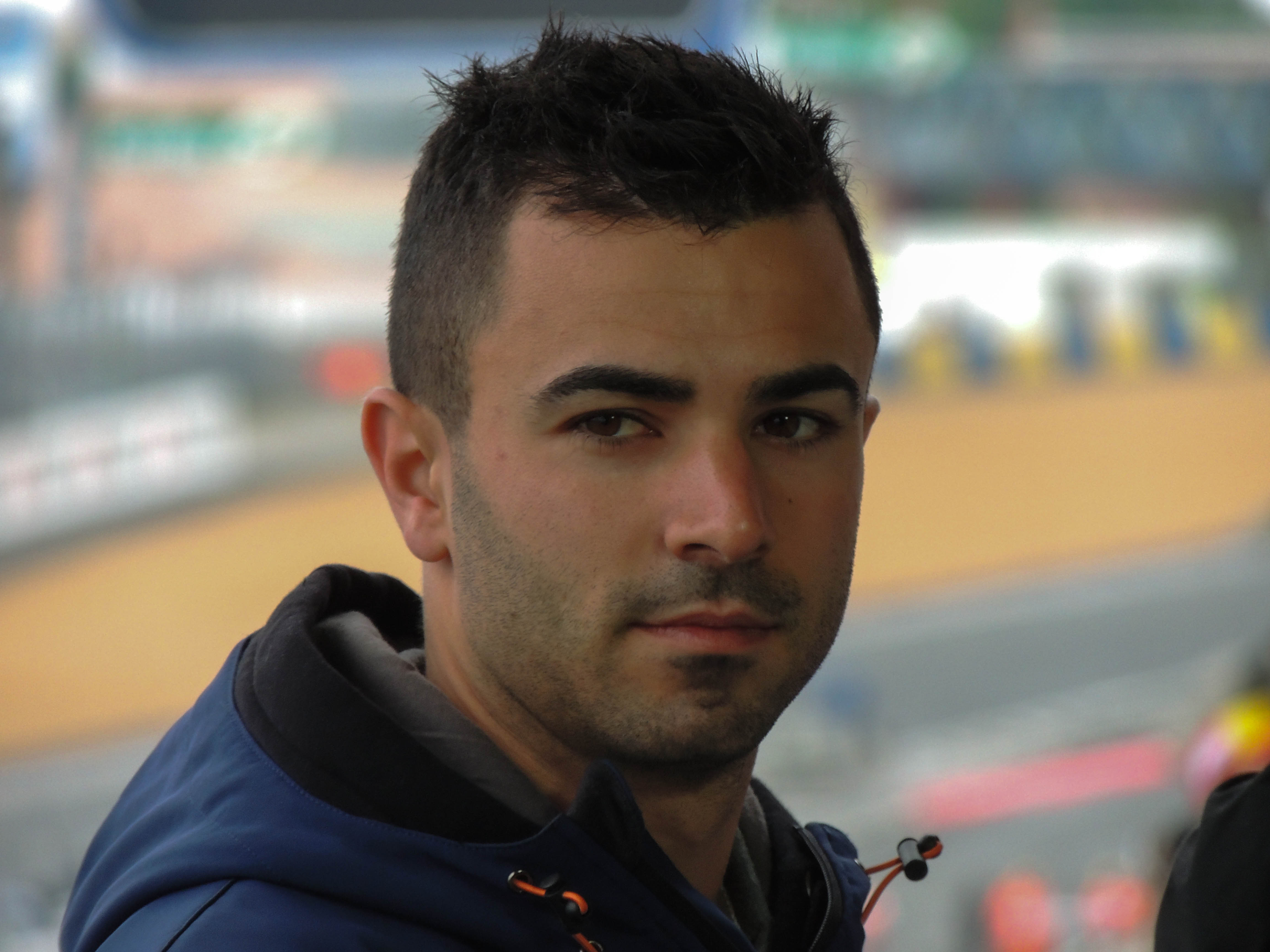
Mike Di Meglio (pictured in 2013) became the 125cc World Champion

The 2008 Grand Prix motorcycle racing season was the 60th F.I.M. Road Racing World Championship season. The season consisted out of 18 races for the MotoGP class and 17 for the 125cc and 250cc classes, beginning with the Qatar motorcycle Grand Prix on 9 March 2008 and ending with the Valencian Community motorcycle Grand Prix on 26 October.

== Season review ==
=== MotoGP ===
The MotoGP class opened with the historic Qatar Grand Prix, the first night race held in the World Championship history. The race was won by Ducati's Casey Stoner ahead of rookie Jorge Lorenzo, who started on pole in his maiden race in the premier class, and Dani Pedrosa.

In Spain Pedrosa won his first race of the year, ahead of Rossi and Lorenzo, while Stoner struggled with technical problems on his bike and finished 11th after twice going out on the gravel. At the Portugal GP, Lorenzo started on pole and won his first MotoGP race, ahead of Pedrosa and Rossi.

In China Rossi took his first win of the season and the first of three consecutive first places, after a weekend dominated by rain and cold temperatures; he then won in France and in front of his home crowd in Italy.

Stoner won the three consecutive races in Britain, the Netherlands and Germany, also obtaining pole position and the fastest lap in all three.

The United States race at Laguna Seca was the biggest turning point of the season. Before the race Stoner trailed Rossi on the standings by only 20 points. The Australian took pole position and started the race in first position. However, Rossi passed Stoner in the middle on the first lap, and Stoner could never make a decisive pass, and he stayed behind until the 24th lap, where he fell at the last corner. He re-mounted, but finished in second place while Rossi caught the first of five consecutive wins. In the next two races, Czech Republic and San Marino, Stoner fell off while leading from Rossi, who then won both times.

The race at Indianapolis was a particularly difficult due to track conditions: the arrival of Hurricane Ike over Indiana meant cold temperatures, heavy winds and rain for the whole race duration; the race was a battle between Rossi and former World Champion Nicky Hayden, who eventually took his first podium of the season. As Rossi began to pull a gap, heavy winds began to blow and the race was ended early with Rossi leading.

Two weeks later, in Japan, Rossi clinched his sixth premier class title with three races to go, by winning the race ahead of Stoner. The Australian then won his home race and in Valencia, while Rossi won in Malaysia.

2008 was also the final season for Michelin as a tyre supplier until 2016, with Bridgestone becoming the MotoGP class' sole tyre supplier for the 2009 season, doing so until the end of 2015.

=== 250cc class ===
The first four races of the season showed the early form of KTM and Mika Kallio, with two wins and two other third places, with strong showings by Marco Simoncelli, Alvaro Bautista and Mattia Pasini, who won the season opener in Qatar, his first race in the class. After the initial problems, though, Simoncelli had a run of 7 consecutive races on the podium, from China to Czech Republic. He started the season on a semi-works Aprilia LE (Gilera is a subsidiary of Aprilia, so Gilera racing bikes are rebranded Aprilia bikes), but his performances led Aprilia to give him a works Aprilia RSA, making him a de facto works rider.

After his strong start, Kallio couldn't keep the pace of Simoncelli, his KTM not being able to challenge the more powerful Aprilias in most tracks. Bautista got into shape well into the season, after a series of bad races and retirements due to problems with his bike and rider errors. After that, however, he also began a streak of podiums which lasted from Catalunya to Malaysia, but Simoncelli was too far ahead of him on the standings, and he won his first World Championship with one race to go.

=== 125cc class ===
Reigning champion Gábor Talmácsi stayed in the class, unlike other top names from last year who moved into 250cc category. Among the pre-season favourites were also Bradley Smith, Simone Corsi and Mike di Meglio. Talmácsi had dismal start to the season, with reliability problems on his new bike. Corsi won three of first six races and despite few bad results, looked good in the championship. However, Mike di Meglio won also multiple races, and having escaped without retirement until Misano, built up strong lead. He clinched the championship two races before the end. Corsi took second ahead of Talmácsi and Bradl who failed to finish the final race.

The season saw eight riders winning races: Talmácsi, Corsi, di Meglio, Sergio Gadea and four first-time winners: Andrea Iannone, Stefan Bradl, Nicolás Terol and Scott Redding, who became the youngest ever winner in the class. The season was completely dominated by the Piaggio bikes, (Aprilia, Derbi and Gilera), as Spanish Marc Márquez was only other rider to achieve podium place with his 3rd place in Donington.

== 2008 Grand Prix season calendar ==
The following Grands Prix were scheduled to take place in 2008:

The 2008 race schedule was released in July 2007. The schedule was later revised, with Japan held before Australia, because of the original Australian date had a conflict with the AFL Grand Final. Two other changes were made. Portugal was moved from 20 April to 13 April and the Grand Finale in Valencia was on 26 October instead of 2 November, to avoid clashes with the F1 season finale.

Round	Date	Grand Prix	Circuit
1	9 March ‡	Commercialbank Grand Prix of Qatar	Losail International Circuit
2	30 March	(Spain) Gran Premio bwin.com de España	Circuito de Jerez
3	13 April	bwin.com Grande Prémio de Portugal	Autódromo do Estoril
4	4 May	Pramac Grand Prix of China	Shanghai International Circuit
5	18 May	Alice Grand Prix de France	Bugatti Circuit
6	1 June	(Italy) Gran Premio d'Italia Alice	Mugello Circuit
7	8 June	(Catalonia) Gran Premi Cinzano de Catalunya	Circuit de Catalunya
8	22 June	(United Kingdom) bwin.com British Grand Prix	Donington Park
9	28 June ††	(Netherlands) A-Style TT Assen	TT Circuit Assen
10	13 July	(Germany) Alice Motorrad Grand Prix Deutschland	Sachsenring
11	20 July †	(United States) Red Bull U.S. Grand Prix	Mazda Raceway Laguna Seca
12	17 August	(Czech Republic) Cardion ab Grand Prix České republiky	Brno Circuit
13	31 August	Gran Premio Cinzano di San Marino e Della Riviera di Rimini	Misano World Circuit
14	14 September	Red Bull Indianapolis Grand Prix	Indianapolis Motor Speedway
15	28 September	A-Style Grand Prix of Japan	Twin Ring Motegi
16	5 October	(Australia) Australian Grand Prix	Phillip Island Grand Prix Circuit
17	19 October	(Malaysia) Polini Malaysian Motorcycle Grand Prix	Sepang International Circuit
18	26 October	(Valencian Community) Gran Premio Parts Europe de la Comunitat Valenciana	Circuit Ricardo Tormo

‡ = Night race
† = MotoGP class only
†† = Saturday race

=== Calendar changes ===
- The Turkish Grand Prix was taken off the calendar.
- The Portuguese Grand Prix was moved forward, from 16 September to 13 April to fill the gap of the Turkish Grand Prix.
- Only the MotoGP class raced during the United States Grand Prix because of a Californian law on air pollution, preventing the 125 and 250cc classes from racing.
- The Indianapolis Grand Prix was added to the calendar.

== Regulation changes ==
The following changes are made to the regulation for the 2008 season:

=== Sporting regulations ===
- The paddock rules have been updated. When the paddock is occupied, it is mandatory to have sufficient medical and fire fighting service available to all riders, teams, manufacturers, sponsors, officials and so on. The services must be accessible from 08:00 to 18:00 at minimum for two days before the setting up of the teams day and on a 24-hour basis for the rest of the event, ending at 00:00 on the day after race day.
- Restrictions have been put in place for tyre testing during practice. Tyre manufacturers that supply tyres in the MotoGP class are allowed to, before the first event of each year, nominate and inform the Race Direction of one circuit as their testing venue where they can practice during the season, as well as the breaks with MotoGP class bikes during a maximum of four days or a part thereof, but not with riders designated by trams and not before the event that will take place at that track. If it is requested by any tyre manufacturer who supplies tyres to the MotoGP class then a two-day test must be organised, but not with riders who are appointed by the teams, at least four weeks before any event is scheduled for a circuit that was not in the championship of last year or that, in the opinion of the Grand Prix Commission, has been significantly resurfaced since the last event at that venue.
- All MotoGP riders may now use a generator to power tyre warmers on the grid. Only one generator can be used per bike. The generator must be portable by hand and have a maximum output capacity of two Kilowatt. The spare bike may remain inside the pits until it will be used in the race, by any exchange of bike must be done in the pit lane.
- Behaviour during the practice and race has been updated. Riders can enter the pits during the race, but taking the motorcycle inside their pit box is prohibited. In the MotoGP class, in the case of a bike change during a race, if a bike that has been used in the race enters the pit box, it will be deemed as 'retired' and can not be used again in the same race. Refuelling is strictly forbidden and anyone who breaks this rule will be penalised with disqualification.
- If a winning rider wants to parade a flag around, he must rider to the side of the track to collect the flag, then rejoin the circuit when it is safe to do so.
- Any rider, team, manufacturer, official and so on, has the right to protest against a decision taken by the FIM. No protest may be entered against a statement of fact of the Race Direction requiring or not:

- a position change.
- a ride through penalty.
- a disqualification from the practice sessions or races via a black flag or black flag with orange disc.
- a fine for speeding in the pit lane.

It is also forbidden to lodge a protest against a statement of fact of the Race Direction based on a photo finish.

- All protests have to be submitted and signed by the person who is directly concerned with the matter only. Each protest has to refer to a single subject only and must be presented within one hour at the latest after the publication of the official results or a notification from a decision taken by the Race Direction. Any protest must be given to a responsible official, which can be a Clerk of the Course, Race Director or Secretary of the Meeting, together with a security payment of 700 US Dollar or similar. All teams and riders who are contracted to participate in the championship can submit a letter of guarantee from the IRTA in the position of payment.

=== Technical regulations ===
- All engines in the MotoGP class up to 800cc will now have unlimited cylinders.
- Clarifications have been made regarding the use of engines. Engines may run on the two-stroke or four-stroke principal only. Only four-strokes are allowed in the MotoGP class whilst the 125cc and 250cc classes use the two-stroke engines. The normal section of each engine cylinder and piston in plan must be circular. Circular section cylinders and pistons are defined as 'having less than 5% difference in the diameter measured at any two points'.
- Fuel tank breather pipes have to incorporate a non-return valve. They must also discharge into a suitable container which is one per bike with a maximum capacity of 200cc and a maximum capacity of 250cc.
- The fuel tank capacities for all MotoGP bikes is set at a maximum of 21 litres.
- Refuelling may only be done from an unpressurised container and the fuel tank can not be artificially pressurised above an areal pressure at any time. It is allowed to vent the fuel tank to the atmosphere via the airbox in order to equalise pressure in the airbox and fuel tank.
- Stops must be fitted to make sure that there is a space of at least 30mm between the handlebar and fuel tank frame and/or bodywork when at the extremes of steering lock.
- Bodywork changes have been made. The seat unit must have a maximum height of the (approximate) vertical section behind the riders seating position, which is 150mm. The measurement will be taken at a 90° angle to the upper surface of the flat base at the riders seating position, excluding any seatpad or covering. Any on-board camera or antenna which is mounted on the seat unit is not added in this measurement.
- Mudguards are not required. When adjusted, front mudguards must not expand in front of a line drawn upwards and forwards at 45 degrees from a horizontal line through the front wheel spindle, as well as below a line drawn horizontally and to the rear of the front wheel spindle. The mudguard mounts/brackets and fork-leg covers, which are close to the suspension leg and wheel spindle, as well as the brake disc covers are not considered to be a part of the mudguard.
- In the 125cc and 250cc classes, the main body of the number used on the bike must be of a single colour which is particular and strongly differentiates with the background colour.
- The amount of allowed tyres to use before the start of a race weekend has been increased. Instead of using a maximum of 31 slick tyres (14 front and 17 rear), the amount has been upped to 40 tyres (18 front and 22 rear). Tyre supplier Dunlop will still be excluded from these restrictions due to the fact that the company has not yet won the minimal two MotoGP races required for this rule.

== 2008 Grand Prix season results ==
Round	Date	Grand Prix	Circuit	125cc winner	250cc winner	MotoGP winner	Report
1	9 March ‡	Qatar motorcycle Grand Prix	Losail	(Spain) Sergio Gadea	(Italy) Mattia Pasini	(Australia) Casey Stoner	Report
2	30 March	(Spain) Spanish motorcycle Grand Prix	Jerez	(Italy) Simone Corsi	(Finland) Mika Kallio	(Spain) Dani Pedrosa	Report
3	13 April	(Portugal) Portuguese motorcycle Grand Prix	Estoril	(Italy) Simone Corsi	(Spain) Álvaro Bautista	(Spain) Jorge Lorenzo	Report
4	4 May	(China) Chinese motorcycle Grand Prix	Shanghai	(Italy) Andrea Iannone	(Finland) Mika Kallio	(Italy) Valentino Rossi	Report
5	18 May	(France) French motorcycle Grand Prix	Le Mans	(France) Mike di Meglio	(Spain) Alex Debón	(Italy) Valentino Rossi	Report
6	1 June	(Italy) Italian motorcycle Grand Prix	Mugello	(Italy) Simone Corsi	(Italy) Marco Simoncelli	(Italy) Valentino Rossi	Report
7	8 June	(Catalonia) Catalan motorcycle Grand Prix	Catalunya	(France) Mike di Meglio	(Italy) Marco Simoncelli	(Spain) Dani Pedrosa	Report
8	22 June	(United Kingdom) British motorcycle Grand Prix	Donington	(United Kingdom) Scott Redding	(Finland) Mika Kallio	(Australia) Casey Stoner	Report
9	28 June ††	(Netherlands) Dutch TT	Assen	(Hungary) Gábor Talmácsi	(Spain) Álvaro Bautista	(Australia) Casey Stoner	Report
10	13 July	(Germany) German motorcycle Grand Prix	Sachsenring	(France) Mike di Meglio	(Italy) Marco Simoncelli	(Australia) Casey Stoner	Report
11	20 July †	United States motorcycle Grand Prix	Laguna Seca	No 125cc and 250cc race		(Italy) Valentino Rossi	Report
12	17 August	Czech Republic motorcycle Grand Prix	Brno	(Germany) Stefan Bradl	(Spain) Alex Debón	(Italy) Valentino Rossi	Report
13	31 August	San Marino and Rimini Riviera motorcycle Grand Prix	Misano	(Hungary) Gábor Talmácsi	(Spain) Álvaro Bautista	(Italy) Valentino Rossi	Report
14	14 September	Indianapolis motorcycle Grand Prix	Indianapolis	(Spain) Nicolás Terol	Race cancelled (Note: The 2008 250cc race was initially postponed after the MotoGP race due to torrential rain & winds caused by Hurricane Ike just before the start of the race, it was subsequently cancelled for the same reason.)	(Italy) Valentino Rossi	Report
15	28 September	(Japan) Japanese motorcycle Grand Prix	Motegi	(Germany) Stefan Bradl	(Italy) Marco Simoncelli	(Italy) Valentino Rossi	Report
16	5 October	(Australia) Australian motorcycle Grand Prix	Phillip Island	(France) Mike di Meglio	(Italy) Marco Simoncelli	(Australia) Casey Stoner	Report
17	19 October	(Malaysia) Malaysian motorcycle Grand Prix	Sepang	(Hungary) Gábor Talmácsi	(Spain) Álvaro Bautista	(Italy) Valentino Rossi	Report
18	26 October	Valencian Community motorcycle Grand Prix	Valencia	(Italy) Simone Corsi	(Italy) Marco Simoncelli	(Australia) Casey Stoner	Report

‡ = Night race
† = MotoGP class only
†† = Saturday race

Footnotes

== Participants ==
=== MotoGP participants ===
Dunlop left MotoGP as tyre manufacturer following the 2007 season.

Team	Constructor	Motorcycle	Tyre	No.	Rider	Rounds
(Italy) Ducati Marlboro Team; Ducati Team (rd 11 and 14)	Ducati	Desmosedici GP8	B	1	(Australia) Casey Stoner	All
(Italy) Ducati Marlboro Team; Ducati Team (rd 11 and 14)	Ducati	Desmosedici GP8	B	33	(Italy) Marco Melandri	All
(Italy) Alice Team	Ducati	Desmosedici GP8	B	24	(Spain) Toni Elías	All
(Italy) Alice Team	Ducati	Desmosedici GP8	B	50	(France) Sylvain Guintoli	All
(Japan) Repsol Honda Team	Honda	RC212V	B	2	(Spain) Dani Pedrosa	14–18
(Japan) Repsol Honda Team	Honda	RC212V	M	2	(Spain) Dani Pedrosa	1–13
(Japan) Repsol Honda Team	Honda	RC212V	M	69	(United States) Nicky Hayden	1–11, 13–18
(Japan) Repsol Honda Team	Honda	RC212V	M	8	(Japan) Tadayuki Okada	6
(Italy) San Carlo Honda Gresini	Honda	RC212V	B	15	(San Marino) Alex de Angelis	All
(Italy) San Carlo Honda Gresini	Honda	RC212V	B	56	(Japan) Shinya Nakano	All
(San Marino) JiR Team Scot MotoGP	Honda	RC212V	M	4	(Italy) Andrea Dovizioso	All
(Monaco) LCR Honda MotoGP	Honda	RC212V	M	14	(France) Randy de Puniet	All
(Japan) Kawasaki Racing Team	Kawasaki	Ninja ZX-RR	B	13	(Australia) Anthony West	All
(Japan) Kawasaki Racing Team	Kawasaki	Ninja ZX-RR	B	21	(United States) John Hopkins	1–9, 12–18
(Japan) Kawasaki Racing Team	Kawasaki	Ninja ZX-RR	B	12	(United States) Jamie Hacking	11
(Japan) Rizla Suzuki MotoGP	Suzuki	GSV-R	B	7	(Australia) Chris Vermeulen	All
(Japan) Rizla Suzuki MotoGP	Suzuki	GSV-R	B	65	(Italy) Loris Capirossi	1–7, 9–18
(Japan) Rizla Suzuki MotoGP	Suzuki	GSV-R	B	11	(United States) Ben Spies	8
(Japan) Rizla Suzuki MotoGP	Suzuki	GSV-R	B	11	(United States) Ben Spies	11, 14
(Japan) Rizla Suzuki MotoGP	Suzuki	GSV-R	B	64	(Japan) Kousuke Akiyoshi	15
(Japan) Rizla Suzuki MotoGP	Suzuki	GSV-R	B	9	(Japan) Nobuatsu Aoki	17
(Japan) Fiat Yamaha Team	Yamaha	YZR-M1	B	46	(Italy) Valentino Rossi	All
(Japan) Fiat Yamaha Team	Yamaha	YZR-M1	M	48	(Spain) Jorge Lorenzo	All
(France) Tech 3 Yamaha	Yamaha	YZR-M1	M	5	(United States) Colin Edwards	All
(France) Tech 3 Yamaha	Yamaha	YZR-M1	M	52	(United Kingdom) James Toseland	All

Key
Regular rider
Wildcard rider
Replacement rider

=== 250cc participants ===
Team	Constructor	Motorcycle	Tyre	No.	Rider	Rounds
Red Bull KTM 250	KTM	KTM 250 FRR	D	4	(Japan) Hiroshi Aoyama	1–10, 12–18
Red Bull KTM 250	KTM	KTM 250 FRR	D	36	(Finland) Mika Kallio	1–10, 12–18
Repsol KTM 250cc	KTM	KTM 250 FRR	D	60	(Spain) Julián Simón	1–10, 12–18
Lotus Aprilia	Aprilia	Aprilia RSA 250	D	6	(Spain) Alex Debón	1–10, 12–18
Lotus Aprilia	Aprilia	Aprilia RSW 250 LE	D	41	(Spain) Aleix Espargaró	1–10, 12–18
Blusens Aprilia	Aprilia	Aprilia RSW 250	D	7	(Spain) Russell Gómez	3–10, 12
Blusens Aprilia	Aprilia	Aprilia RSW 250	D	43	(Spain) Manuel Hernández	1–2, 13–18
Blusens Aprilia	Aprilia	Aprilia RSW 250	D	50	(Republic of Ireland) Eugene Laverty	1–10, 12–14
Blusens Aprilia	Aprilia	Aprilia RSW 250	D	92	(Spain) Daniel Arcas	15–18
Team Toth Aprilia	Aprilia	Aprilia RSW 250	D	10	(Hungary) Imre Tóth	1–10, 12–15
Team Toth Aprilia	Aprilia	Aprilia RSA 250	D	10	(Hungary) Imre Tóth	16–18
Team Toth Aprilia	Aprilia	Aprilia RSA 250	D	21	(Spain) Héctor Barberá	1–10, 12–15
Team Toth Aprilia	Aprilia	Aprilia RSW 250	D	27	(Italy) Stefano Bianco	16
Team Toth Aprilia	Aprilia	Aprilia RSW 250	D	93	(Hungary) Alen Győrfi	18
Emmi - Caffe Latte	Aprilia	Aprilia RSA 250	D	12	(Switzerland) Thomas Lüthi	1–10, 12–14, 17–18
Auto Kelly CP	Aprilia	Aprilia RSW 250 LE	D	52	(Czech Republic) Lukáš Pešek	1–10, 12–18
Thai Honda PTT-SAG	Honda	Honda RS250RW	D	14	(Thailand) Ratthapark Wilairot	1–10, 12–18
Metis Gilera	Gilera	Gilera RSW 250 LE	D	15	(Italy) Roberto Locatelli	1–10, 12–18
Metis Gilera	Gilera	Gilera RSA 250	D	58	(Italy) Marco Simoncelli	1–10, 12–18
Cardion AB Motoracing	Aprilia	Aprilia RSW 250 LE	D	17	(Czech Republic) Karel Abraham	1–10, 12–18
Mapfre Aspar Team	Aprilia	Aprilia RSA 250	D	19	(Spain) Álvaro Bautista	1–10, 12–18
Mapfre Aspar Team	Aprilia	Aprilia RSA 250	D	55	(Spain) Héctor Faubel	1–10, 12–18
Matteoni Racing	Aprilia	Aprilia RSW 250	D	25	(Italy) Alex Baldolini	1–10, 12–18
Matteoni Racing	Aprilia	Aprilia RSW 250	D	90	(Italy) Federico Sandi	12–13
Campetella Racing	Gilera	Gilera RSW 250	D	27	(Italy) Stefano Bianco	14
Campetella Racing	Gilera	Gilera RSW 250	D	32	(Italy) Fabrizio Lai	1–10, 12–13, 15–18
Campetella Racing	Gilera	Gilera RSW 250	D	35	(Italy) Simone Grotzkyj	13–18
Campetella Racing	Gilera	Gilera RSW 250 LE	D	54	(San Marino) Manuel Poggiali	1–10, 12
Yamaha Pertamina Indonesia	Yamaha	Yamaha TZ 250	D	45	(Indonesia) Doni Tata Pradita	1–10, 12–18
JiR Team Scot 250	Honda	Honda RS250RW	D	72	(Japan) Yuki Takahashi	1–10, 12–18
Polaris World	Aprilia	Aprilia RSA 250	D	75	(Italy) Mattia Pasini	1–10, 12–18
Longevity Racing	Yamaha	Yamaha TZ 250	D	29	(United States) Barrett Long	14
Team Infinity Replicast	Yamaha	Yamaha TZ 250	D	38	(United States) Kyle Ferris	14
BM Groundworks	Yamaha	Yamaha TZ 250	D	63	(United Kingdom) Toby Markham	8
Jaap Kingma Racing	Aprilia	Aprilia RSW 250	D	64	(Sweden) Frederik Watz	9
Burning Blood Racing Team	Honda	Honda RS250R	D	65	(Japan) Takumi Takahashi	15
Project U FRS	Honda	Honda RS250R	D	66	(Japan) Shoya Tomizawa	15
RT Morinokumasan-Satohjuku	Yamaha	Yamaha TZ 250	B	67	(Japan) Kazuki Watanabe	15
Dog Fight Racing	Yamaha	Yamaha TZ 250	D	68	(Japan) Yuuki Ito	15
Ser.Spruce/Pro-Tec	Yamaha	Yamaha TZ 250	D	69	(Japan) Takumi Endoh	15
Zongshen Team of China	Aprilia	Aprilia RSW 250	D	89	(China) Ho Wan Chow	3, 5, 10, 16
Zongshen Team of China	Aprilia	Aprilia RSW 250	D	90	(Italy) Federico Sandi	3, 5, 10
Zongshen AOS Racing	Aprilia	Aprilia RSW 250	D	90	(Italy) Federico Sandi	16, 18
Paddock Competições	Honda	Honda RS250R	D	91	(Portugal) Sérgio Batista	3
Team Honda Merson	Honda	Honda RS250R	D	92	(Spain) Daniel Arcas	7
Motorcycle Competition Service	Honda	Honda RS250R	D	93	(Hungary) Alen Győrfi	10, 13
Racing Team Germany	Honda	Honda RS250R	D	94	(Germany) Toni Wirsing	10, 12–13, 18

Key
Regular rider
Wildcard rider
Replacement rider

=== 125cc participants ===
Team	Constructor	Motorcycle	Tyre	No.	Rider	Rounds
Bancaja Aspar Team	Aprilia	Aprilia RSA 125	D	1	(Hungary) Gábor Talmácsi	1–10, 12–18
Bancaja Aspar Team	Aprilia	Aprilia RS 125 R	D	26	(Spain) Adrián Martín	13, 15–18
Bancaja Aspar Team	Aprilia	Aprilia RS 125 R	D	30	(Spain) Pere Tutusaus	1–10, 12
Bancaja Aspar Team	Aprilia	Aprilia RSA 125	D	33	(Spain) Sergio Gadea	1–10, 12–18
Bancaja Aspar Team	Aprilia	Aprilia RS 125 R	D	54	(United States) PJ Jacobsen	14
Loncin Racing	Loncin	Loncin	D	5	(France) Alexis Masbou	1–10, 12–18
Loncin Racing	Loncin	Loncin	D	16	(France) Jules Cluzel	1–4, 6–10, 12–18
Loncin Racing	Loncin	Loncin	D	61	(Italy) Gioele Pellino	5
Belson Derbi	Derbi	Derbi RSA 125	D	6	(Spain) Joan Olivé	1–10, 12–18
Belson Derbi	Derbi	Derbi RSA 125	D	44	(Spain) Pol Espargaró	1–8, 10, 12–18
Blusens Aprilia Junior	Aprilia	Aprilia RS 125 R	D	7	(Spain) Efrén Vázquez	1–10, 12–18
Blusens Aprilia Junior	Aprilia	Aprilia RS 125 R	D	45	(United Kingdom) Scott Redding	1–10, 12–18
BQR Blusens	Aprilia	Aprilia RS 125 R	D	13	(Italy) Dino Lombardi	1, 3
ISPA KTM Aran	KTM	KTM 125 FRR	D	8	(Italy) Lorenzo Zanetti	1–10, 12–18
ISPA KTM Aran	KTM	KTM 125 FRR	D	28	(Spain) Enrique Jerez	16–18
ISPA KTM Aran	KTM	KTM 125 FRR	D	71	(Japan) Tomoyoshi Koyama	1–10, 12–15
ISPA KTM Aran	KTM	KTM 125 FRR	D	74	(Italy) Davide Stirpe	14
Emmi - Caffe Latte	Aprilia	Aprilia RSA 125	D	11	(Germany) Sandro Cortese	1–10, 12–18
Repsol KTM 125	KTM	KTM 125 FRR	D	12	(Spain) Esteve Rabat	1–10, 12–18
Repsol KTM 125	KTM	KTM 125 FRR	D	93	(Spain) Marc Márquez	2–10, 12–17
Red Bull KTM 125	KTM	KTM 125 FRR	D	34	(Switzerland) Randy Krummenacher	1–2, 4–10, 12–13, 16–18
Red Bull KTM 125	KTM	KTM 125 FRR	D	94	(Germany) Jonas Folger	14–15, 18
Red Bull KTM 125	KTM	KTM 125 FRR	D	71	(Japan) Tomoyoshi Koyama	17–18
Red Bull MotoGP Academy	KTM	KTM 125 FRR	D	94	(Germany) Jonas Folger	12–13, 17
Grizzly Gas Kiefer Racing	Aprilia	Aprilia RSA 125	D	17	(Germany) Stefan Bradl	1–10, 12–18
Grizzly Gas Kiefer Racing	Aprilia	Aprilia RS 125 R	D	21	(Germany) Robin Lässer	1–2, 4–10, 12–18
Grizzly Gas Kiefer Racing	Aprilia	Aprilia RS 125 R	D	95	(Romania) Robert Mureșan	1–10, 12, 14–18
Grizzly Gas Kiefer Racing	Aprilia	Aprilia RS 125 R	D	42	(Italy) Luca Vitali	13
Jack & Jones WRB	Aprilia	Aprilia RS 125 R	D	18	(Spain) Nicolás Terol	1–10, 12–18
Jack & Jones WRB	Aprilia	Aprilia RSA 125	D	24	(Italy) Simone Corsi	1–10, 12–18
Jack & Jones WRB	Aprilia	Aprilia RS 125 R	D	14	(Spain) Axel Pons	2, 3, 7
Matteoni Racing	Aprilia	Aprilia RS 125 R	D	19	(Italy) Roberto Lacalendola	1–9
Matteoni Racing	Aprilia	Aprilia RS 125 R	D	72	(Italy) Marco Ravaioli	10, 12–18
Matteoni Racing	Aprilia	Aprilia RS 125 R	D	96	(Czech Republic) Lukáš Šembera	12
Onde 2000 KTM	KTM	KTM 125 FRR	D	22	(Spain) Pablo Nieto	1–10, 12–18
Onde 2000 KTM	KTM	KTM 125 FRR	D	35	(Italy) Raffaele De Rosa	1–10, 12–18
S3+ WTR San Marino Team	Aprilia	Aprilia RS 125 R	D	27	(Italy) Stefano Bianco	1–9
S3+ WTR San Marino Team	Aprilia	Aprilia RS 125 R	D	48	(Switzerland) Bastien Chesaux	10, 12–18
I.C. Team	Aprilia	Aprilia RS 125 R	D	29	(Italy) Andrea Iannone	1–10, 12–18
I.C. Team	Aprilia	Aprilia RS 125 R	D	40	(Italy) Lorenzo Savadori	18
I.C. Team	Aprilia	Aprilia RS 125 R	D	60	(Austria) Michael Ranseder	1–10, 12–16
I.C. Team	Aprilia	Aprilia RS 125 R	D	73	(Japan) Takaaki Nakagami	1–10, 12–18
Polaris World	Aprilia	Aprilia RSA 125	D	38	(United Kingdom) Bradley Smith	1–10, 12–18
Degraaf Grand Prix	Aprilia	Aprilia RS 125 R	D	51	(United States) Stevie Bonsey	1–10, 12–18
Degraaf Grand Prix	Aprilia	Aprilia RS 125 R	D	56	(Netherlands) Hugo van den Berg	1–10, 12–18
Degraaf Grand Prix	Aprilia	Aprilia RS 125 R	D	83	(Netherlands) Jerry van de Bunt	9
Degraaf Grand Prix	Aprilia	Aprilia RS 125 R	D	99	(United Kingdom) Danny Webb	1–8, 10, 12–18
Ajo Motorsport	Derbi	Derbi RSA 125	D	63	(France) Mike Di Meglio	1–10, 12–18
Ajo Motorsport	Derbi	Derbi RS 125 R	D	77	(Switzerland) Dominique Aegerter	1–10, 12–18
Ajo Motorsports Jnr. Project	Derbi	Derbi RS 125 R	D	84	(Sweden) Robert Gull	9
FFM Honda GP 125	Honda	Honda RS125R	D	69	(France) Louis Rossi	1–10, 12–13, 18
FFM Honda GP 125	Honda	Honda RS125R	D	36	(France) Cyril Carrillo	3, 5
FFM Honda GP 125	Honda	Honda RS125R	D	36	(France) Cyril Carrillo	14–17
Bancaja Mir CEV	Aprilia	Aprilia RS 125 R	D	23	(Spain) Julián Miralles	18
Alpo Atlético de Madrid	Aprilia	Aprilia RS 125 R	D	25	(Spain) Cristian Trabalón	18
Alpo Atlético de Madrid	Aprilia	Aprilia RS 125 R	D	30	(Spain) Pere Tutusaus	18
Alpo Atlético de Madrid	Honda	Honda RS125R	D	76	(Spain) Iván Maestro	2
SAG Castrol	Honda	Honda RS125R	D	31	(Spain) Jordi Dalmau	7
Leigh-Smith Racing	Honda	Honda RS125R	D	32	(Australia) Blake Leigh-Smith	16
Czech Road Racing JNR.	Aprilia	Aprilia RS 125 R	D	37	(Czech Republic) Karel Pešek	3, 12
Junior GP Racing Dream	Aprilia	Aprilia RS 125 R	D	39	(Italy) Ferruccio Lamborghini	6
Junior GP Racing Dream	Aprilia	Aprilia RS 125 R	D	49	(Italy) Gennaro Sabatino	13
RCGM	Aprilia	Aprilia RS 125 R	D	40	(Italy) Lorenzo Savadori	6, 13
RCGM	Aprilia	Aprilia RS 125 R	D	42	(Italy) Luca Vitali	6
ADAC Nordbayern e.V.	Aprilia	Aprilia RS 125 R	D	41	(Germany) Tobias Siegert	5, 10
Metasystem RS	Honda	Honda RS125R	D	43	(Italy) Gabriele Ferro	6, 14
Gross Racing	Yamaha	Yamaha TZ125	D	46	(Australia) Brad Gross	16
CRP Racing	Honda	Honda RS125R	D	47	(Italy) Riccardo Moretti	6, 13
DYDO Miu Racing	Honda	Honda RS125R	B	50	(Japan) Hiroomi Iwata	15
Villiers Team Competition	Honda	Honda RS125R	D	52	(France) Steven Le Coquen	5
Racing Motoclub Circuit D'Albi	KTM	KTM 125 FRR	D	53	(France) Valentin Debise	5
Honda Suzuka Racing	Honda	Honda RS125R	B	57	(Japan) Iori Namihira	15
18 Garage Racing	Honda	Honda RS125R	D	58	(Japan) Yuuichi Yanagisawa	15
Battle Factory	Honda	Honda RS125R	D	59	(Japan) Hiroki Ono	15
Team Plus One	Honda	Honda RS125R	B	62	(Japan) Kazuma Watanabe	15
SP 125 Racing/Mackrory Demolition	Honda	Honda RS125R	D	64	(United Kingdom) Matthew Hoyle	8
Buildbase/Knotts	Honda	Honda RS125R	D	65	(United Kingdom) Luke Hinton	8
Connor Behan Racing	Honda	Honda RS125R	D	66	(United Kingdom) Connor Behan	8
Vent-Axia	Honda	Honda RS125R	D	67	(United Kingdom) Lee Costello	8
KRP	Honda	Honda RS125R	D	68	(Republic of Ireland) Paul Jordan	8
Rhys Moller Racing	Honda	Honda RS125R	D	70	(Australia) Rhys Moller	16
Andalucía Derbi	Derbi	Derbi RS 125 R	D	75	(Spain) Ricard Cardús	7, 18
Andalucía Derbi	Derbi	Derbi RS 125 R	D	79	(Spain) Alberto Moncayo	2
Hune Matteoni	Aprilia	Aprilia RS 125 R	D	76	(Spain) Iván Maestro	3, 7
Gaviota Prosolia Racing	Aprilia	Aprilia RS 125 R	D	78	(Spain) Daniel Sáez	2, 7, 18
Abbink Bos Racing	Seel	Seel	B	80	(Netherlands) Joey Litjens	9
Abbink Bos Racing	Seel	Seel	B	81	(Netherlands) Jasper Iwema	9
Dutch Racing Team	Honda	Honda RS125R	D	82	(Netherlands) Michael van der Mark	9
Kiefer Bos Sotin Jnr. Team	Seel	Seel	D	85	(Germany) Marvin Fritz	10
Team Sachsenring	Aprilia	Aprilia RS 125 R	D	86	(Germany) Eric Hübsch	10
Toni Mang Team	Honda	Honda RS125R	D	87	(Germany) Marcel Schrötter	10
RZT-Racing	Honda	Honda RS125R	D	88	(Germany) Sebastian Kreuziger	10
RV Racing Team	Honda	Honda RS125R	D	89	(Netherlands) Ernst Dubbink	9
Veloce Racing	Aprilia	Aprilia RS 125 R	D	90	(United States) Kristian Lee Turner	14
Angelo's Aluminium Racing	Honda	Honda RS125R	D	91	(Australia) Jed Metcher	16
Team Anchor Yamaha	Honda	Honda RS125R	D	92	(Australia) Jake Horne	16
Roha'c & Fetja Motoracing	Aprilia	Aprilia RS 125 R	D	97	(Czech Republic) Michal Prášek	12
Eurowag Junior Racing	Honda	Honda RS125R	D	98	(Czech Republic) Andrea Toušková	12

Key
Regular rider
Wildcard rider
Replacement rider

== Standings ==
=== MotoGP standings ===
Scoring system

Points were awarded to the top fifteen finishers. Rider had to finish the race to earn points.

Position	**1st**	**2nd**	**3rd**	**4th**	**5th**	**6th**	**7th**	**8th**	**9th**	**10th**	**11th**	**12th**	**13th**	**14th**	**15th**
Points	25	20	16	13	11	10	9	8	7	6	5	4	3	2	1

==== Riders' standings ====
- Rounds marked with a light blue background were under wet race conditions or stopped by rain.
- Riders marked with light blue background were eligible for Rookie of the Year awards.

Pos	Rider	Bike	Team	QAT (Qatar)	SPA (Spain)	POR (Portugal)	CHN (China)	FRA (France)	ITA (Italy)	CAT (Catalonia)	GBR (United Kingdom)	NED (Netherlands)	GER (Germany)	USA (United States)	CZE (Czech Republic)	SMR (San Marino)	INP (Indianapolis)	JPN (Japan)	AUS (Australia)	MAL (Malaysia)	VAL (Valencian Community)	Pts
1	(Italy) Valentino Rossi	Yamaha	Fiat Yamaha Team	5	2	3	1	1	**1**	2	2	11	2	1	1	1	**1**	1	2	1	3	373
2	(Australia) Casey Stoner	Ducati	Ducati Marlboro Team	1	11	6	3	16	2	**3**	**1**	**1**	**1**	**2**	**Ret**	**Ret**	4	2	**1**	6	**1**	280
3	(Spain) Dani Pedrosa	Honda	Repsol Honda Team	3	1	2	2	**4**	3	1	3	2	Ret	WD	15	4	8	3	Ret	**2**	2	249
4	(Spain) Jorge Lorenzo	Yamaha	Fiat Yamaha Team	**2**	**3**	**1**	4	2	Ret	WD	6	6	Ret	Ret	10	2	3	**4**	4	Ret	8	190
5	(Italy) Andrea Dovizioso	Honda	JiR Team Scot MotoGP	4	8	Ret	11	6	8	4	5	5	5	4	9	8	5	9	7	3	4	174
6	(United States) Nicky Hayden	Honda	Repsol Honda Team	10	4	Ret	6	8	13	8	7	4	13	5		DNS	2	5	3	4	5	155
7	(United States) Colin Edwards	Yamaha	Tech 3 Yamaha	7	Ret	4	**7**	3	5	5	4	3	Ret	14	14	10	15	7	8	8	6	144
8	(Australia) Chris Vermeulen	Suzuki	Rizla Suzuki MotoGP	17	10	8	Ret	5	10	7	8	7	3	3	6	5	9	Ret	15	9	13	128
9	(Japan) Shinya Nakano	Honda	San Carlo Honda Gresini	13	9	10	10	10	9	9	9	8	9	10	4	12	17	8	5	5	7	126
10	(Italy) Loris Capirossi	Suzuki	Rizla Suzuki MotoGP	8	5	9	9	7	7	Ret		WD	7	15	3	7	16	6	10	7	9	118
11	(United Kingdom) James Toseland	Yamaha	Tech 3 Yamaha	6	6	7	12	Ret	6	6	17	9	11	9	13	6	18	11	6	Ret	11	105
12	(Spain) Toni Elías	Ducati	Alice Team	14	15	12	8	11	12	DSQ	11	12	12	7	2	3	12	16	11	15	18	92
13	(France) Sylvain Guintoli	Ducati	Alice Team	15	16	14	15	13	11	13	13	10	6	12	12	11	7	14	14	13	12	67
14	(San Marino) Alex de Angelis	Honda	San Carlo Honda Gresini	Ret	14	11	16	12	4	Ret	15	Ret	4	13	8	Ret	10	17	Ret	14	10	63
15	(France) Randy de Puniet	Honda	LCR Honda MotoGP	9	Ret	15	13	9	Ret	Ret	12	Ret	8	6	16	Ret	13	12	9	10	15	61
16	(United States) John Hopkins	Kawasaki	Kawasaki Racing Team	12	7	5	14	Ret	Ret	10	Ret	DNS			11	14	14	10	13	11	14	57
17	(Italy) Marco Melandri	Ducati	Ducati Marlboro Team	11	12	13	5	15	Ret	11	16	13	Ret	16	7	9	19	13	16	16	16	51
18	(Australia) Anthony West	Kawasaki	Kawasaki Racing Team	16	13	16	17	14	15	12	10	Ret	10	17	5	13	11	15	12	12	17	50
19	(United States) Ben Spies	Suzuki	Rizla Suzuki MotoGP								14			8			6					20
20	(United States) Jamie Hacking	Kawasaki	Kawasaki Racing Team											11								5
21	(Japan) Tadayuki Okada	Honda	Repsol Honda Team						14													2
	(Japan) Nobuatsu Aoki	Suzuki	Rizla Suzuki MotoGP																	17		0
	(Japan) Kousuke Akiyoshi	Suzuki	Rizla Suzuki MotoGP															Ret				0
Pos	Rider	Bike	Team	QAT (Qatar)	SPA (Spain)	POR (Portugal)	CHN (China)	FRA (France)	ITA (Italy)	CAT (Catalonia)	GBR (United Kingdom)	NED (Netherlands)	GER (Germany)	USA (United States)	CZE (Czech Republic)	SMR (San Marino)	INP (Indianapolis)	JPN (Japan)	AUS (Australia)	MAL (Malaysia)	VAL (Valencian Community)	Pts

Colour	Result
Gold	Winner
Silver	Second place
Bronze	Third place
Green	Points classification
Blue	Non-points classification
Blue	Non-classified finish (NC)
Purple	Retired, not classified (Ret)
Red	Did not qualify (DNQ)
Red	Did not pre-qualify (DNPQ)
Black	Disqualified (DSQ)
White	Did not start (DNS)
White	Withdrew (WD)
White	Race cancelled (C)
Blank	Did not practice (DNP)
Blank	Did not arrive (DNA)
Blank	Excluded (EX)

**Bold** – Pole position
Italics – Fastest lap

==== Constructors' standings ====
- Each constructor got the same number of points as their best placed rider in each race.
- Rounds marked with a light blue background were under wet race conditions or stopped by rain.

Pos	Constructor	QAT (Qatar)	SPA (Spain)	POR (Portugal)	CHN (China)	FRA (France)	ITA (Italy)	CAT (Catalonia)	GBR (United Kingdom)	NED (Netherlands)	GER (Germany)	USA (United States)	CZE (Czech Republic)	SMR (San Marino)	INP (Indianapolis)	JPN (Japan)	AUS (Australia)	MAL (Malaysia)	VAL (Valencian Community)	Pts
1	(Japan) Yamaha	2	2	1	1	1	1	2	2	3	2	1	1	1	1	1	2	1	3	402
2	(Italy) Ducati	1	11	6	3	11	2	3	1	1	1	2	2	3	4	2	1	6	1	321
3	(Japan) Honda	3	1	2	2	4	3	1	3	2	4	4	4	4	2	3	3	2	2	315
4	(Japan) Suzuki	8	5	8	9	5	7	7	8	7	3	3	3	5	6	6	10	7	9	181
5	(Japan) Kawasaki	12	7	5	14	14	15	10	10	Ret	10	11	5	13	11	10	12	11	14	88
Pos	Constructor	QAT (Qatar)	SPA (Spain)	POR (Portugal)	CHN (China)	FRA (France)	ITA (Italy)	CAT (Catalonia)	GBR (United Kingdom)	NED (Netherlands)	GER (Germany)	USA (United States)	CZE (Czech Republic)	SMR (San Marino)	INP (Indianapolis)	JPN (Japan)	AUS (Australia)	MAL (Malaysia)	VAL (Valencian Community)	Pts

==== Teams' standings ====
- Each team got the total points scored by their two riders, including replacement riders. In one rider team, only the points scored by that rider was counted. Wildcard riders did not score points.
- Rounds marked with a light blue background were under wet race conditions or stopped by rain.

Pos	Team	Bike No.	QAT (Qatar)	SPA (Spain)	POR (Portugal)	CHN (China)	FRA (France)	ITA (Italy)	CAT (Catalonia)	GBR (United Kingdom)	NED (Netherlands)	GER (Germany)	USA (United States)	CZE (Czech Republic)	SMR (San Marino)	INP (Indianapolis)	JPN (Japan)	AUS (Australia)	MAL (Malaysia)	VAL (Valencian Community)	Pts
1	(Japan) Fiat Yamaha Team	46	5	2	3	1	1	**1**	2	2	11	2	1	1	1	**1**	1	2	1	3	563
1	(Japan) Fiat Yamaha Team	48	**2**	**3**	**1**	4	2	Ret	WD	6	6	Ret	Ret	10	2	3	**4**	4	Ret	8	563
2	(Japan) Repsol Honda Team	2	3	1	2	2	**4**	3	1	3	2	Ret	WD	15	4	8	3	Ret	**2**	2	404
2	(Japan) Repsol Honda Team	69	10	4	Ret	6	8	13	8	7	4	13	5		DNS	2	5	3	4	5	404
3	(Italy) Ducati Marlboro Team	1	1	11	6	3	16	2	**3**	**1**	**1**	**1**	**2**	**Ret**	**Ret**	4	2	**1**	6	**1**	331
3	(Italy) Ducati Marlboro Team	33	11	12	13	5	15	Ret	11	16	13	Ret	16	7	9	19	13	16	16	16	331
4	(France) Tech 3 Yamaha	5	7	Ret	4	**7**	3	5	5	4	3	Ret	14	14	10	15	7	8	8	6	249
4	(France) Tech 3 Yamaha	52	6	6	7	12	Ret	6	6	17	9	11	9	13	6	18	11	6	Ret	11	249
5	(Japan) Rizla Suzuki MotoGP	7	17	10	8	Ret	5	10	7	8	7	3	3	6	5	9	Ret	15	9	13	248
5	(Japan) Rizla Suzuki MotoGP	11								14											248
5	(Japan) Rizla Suzuki MotoGP	65	8	5	9	9	7	7	Ret		WD	7	15	3	7	16	6	10	7	9	248
6	(Italy) San Carlo Honda Gresini	15	Ret	14	11	16	12	4	Ret	15	Ret	4	13	8	Ret	10	17	Ret	14	10	189
6	(Italy) San Carlo Honda Gresini	56	13	9	10	10	10	9	9	9	8	9	10	4	12	17	8	5	5	7	189
7	(San Marino) JiR Team Scot MotoGP	4	4	8	Ret	11	6	8	4	5	5	5	4	9	8	5	9	7	3	4	174
8	(Italy) Alice Team	24	14	15	12	8	11	12	DSQ	11	12	12	7	2	3	12	16	11	15	18	159
8	(Italy) Alice Team	50	15	16	14	15	13	11	13	13	10	6	12	12	11	7	14	14	13	12	159
9	(Japan) Kawasaki Racing Team	12											11								112
9	(Japan) Kawasaki Racing Team	13	16	13	16	17	14	15	12	10	Ret	10	17	5	13	11	15	12	12	17	112
9	(Japan) Kawasaki Racing Team	21	12	7	5	14	Ret	Ret	10	Ret	DNS			11	14	14	10	13	11	14	112
10	(Monaco) LCR Honda MotoGP	14	9	Ret	15	13	9	Ret	Ret	12	Ret	8	6	16	Ret	13	12	9	10	15	61
Pos	Team	Bike No.	QAT (Qatar)	SPA (Spain)	POR (Portugal)	CHN (China)	FRA (France)	ITA (Italy)	CAT (Catalonia)	GBR (United Kingdom)	NED (Netherlands)	GER (Germany)	USA (United States)	CZE (Czech Republic)	SMR (San Marino)	INP (Indianapolis)	JPN (Japan)	AUS (Australia)	MAL (Malaysia)	VAL (Valencian Community)	Pts

=== 250cc standings ===
Scoring system

Points were awarded to the top fifteen finishers. Rider had to finish the race to earn points.

Position	**1st**	**2nd**	**3rd**	**4th**	**5th**	**6th**	**7th**	**8th**	**9th**	**10th**	**11th**	**12th**	**13th**	**14th**	**15th**
Points	25	20	16	13	11	10	9	8	7	6	5	4	3	2	1

==== Riders' standings ====
- Rounds marked with a light blue background were under wet race conditions or stopped by rain.
- Riders marked with light blue background were eligible for Rookie of the Year awards.

Pos	Rider	Bike	QAT (Qatar)	SPA (Spain)	POR (Portugal)	CHN (China)	FRA (France)	ITA (Italy)	CAT (Catalonia)	GBR (United Kingdom)	NED (Netherlands)	GER (Germany)	CZE (Czech Republic)	SMR (San Marino)	INP (Indianapolis)	JPN (Japan)	AUS (Australia)	MAL (Malaysia)	VAL (Valencian Community)	Pts
1	(Italy) Marco Simoncelli	Gilera	Ret	Ret	**2**	4	2	1	1	2	3	**1**	**3**	6	**C**	**1**	**1**	3	**1**	281
2	(Spain) Álvaro Bautista	Aprilia	6	**Ret**	1	**12**	14	Ret	**2**	**3**	**1**	3	2	1	C	2	2	1	3	244
3	(Finland) Mika Kallio	KTM	3	1	3	1	5	4	Ret	1	7	4	5	Ret	C	5	3	Ret	11	196
4	(Spain) Alex Debón	Aprilia	**4**	6	Ret	5	**1**	2	4	7	4	Ret	1	Ret	C	3	5	6	Ret	176
5	(Japan) Yuki Takahashi	Honda	5	3	6	7	4	Ret	12	9	8	9	6	2	C	6	7	4	2	167
6	(Spain) Héctor Barberá	Aprilia	2	5	8	6	12	**Ret**	3	4	5	2	4	**3**	C	DNS				142
7	(Japan) Hiroshi Aoyama	KTM	16	4	5	2	7	8	7	6	6	8	13	Ret	C	9	Ret	**2**	5	139
8	(Italy) Mattia Pasini	Aprilia	1	2	Ret	3	3	5	6	Ret	Ret	6	7	Ret	C	8	Ret	Ret	9	132
9	(Italy) Roberto Locatelli	Gilera	8	8	Ret	11	13	6	Ret	11	9	10	9	4	C	10	6	7	4	110
10	(Spain) Julián Simón	KTM	11	7	7	Ret	8	11	9	8	10	5	12	5	C	4	4	Ret	Ret	109
11	(Switzerland) Thomas Lüthi	Aprilia	15	Ret	4	Ret	11	3	5	5	2	7	Ret	7	C			9	10	108
12	(Spain) Aleix Espargaró	Aprilia	9	9	11	9	9	9	Ret	10	17	13	10	Ret	C	7	8	5	7	92
13	(Thailand) Ratthapark Wilairot	Honda	13	12	13	8	15	10	11	16	12	16	11	8	C	13	9	8	8	73
14	(Spain) Héctor Faubel	Aprilia	10	Ret	9	10	10	Ret	8	15	11	14	8	Ret	C	11	Ret	Ret	6	64
15	(Czech Republic) Lukáš Pešek	Aprilia	Ret	10	10	Ret	Ret	Ret	10	13	15	Ret	14	9	C	12	14	10	Ret	43
16	(Czech Republic) Karel Abraham	Aprilia	7	13	16	Ret	Ret	7	Ret	12	DNS	Ret	Ret	10	C	DNS	11	12	17	40
17	(Italy) Alex Baldolini	Aprilia	Ret	11	12	Ret	16	12	13	Ret	14	11	15	Ret	C	16	12	13	12	35
18	(Italy) Fabrizio Lai	Gilera	12	Ret	Ret	14	Ret	14	15	17	13	12	17	11		15	10	11	Ret	33
19	(San Marino) Manuel Poggiali	Gilera	14	Ret	17	Ret	6	Ret	14	14	Ret	DNS	DNS							16
20	(Hungary) Imre Tóth	Aprilia	Ret	15	18	16	18	15	Ret	Ret	20	17	Ret	Ret	C	22	13	15	13	9
21	(Republic of Ireland) Eugene Laverty	Aprilia	Ret	Ret	15	13	Ret	13	Ret	Ret	16	15	16	Ret	C					8
22	(Italy) Federico Sandi	Aprilia			14		17					Ret	18	12			Ret		18	6
23	(Spain) Manuel Hernández	Aprilia	Ret	14										13	C	19	Ret	16	16	5
24	(Italy) Simone Grotzkyj	Gilera												15	C	Ret	15	14	15	4
25	(Spain) Daniel Arcas	Honda							Ret											2
25	(Spain) Daniel Arcas	Aprilia														20	16	17	14	2
26	(Japan) Shoya Tomizawa	Honda														14				2
27	(Germany) Toni Wirsing	Honda										20	20	14					Ret	2
28	(Indonesia) Doni Tata Pradita	Yamaha	17	16	19	15	Ret	17	18	19	19	19	19	16	C	18	17	18	19	1
	(Spain) Russell Gómez	Aprilia			Ret	17	19	16	17	18	Ret	Ret	21							0
	(Japan) Takumi Takahashi	Honda														17				0
	(Hungary) Alen Győrfi	Honda										18		DNQ						0
	(Hungary) Alen Győrfi	Aprilia																	Ret	0
	(Sweden) Frederik Watz	Aprilia									18									0
	(Japan) Takumi Endoh	Yamaha														21				0
	(Japan) Yuuki Ito	Yamaha														23				0
	(China) Ho Wan Chow	Aprilia			Ret		DNQ					DNQ					DNQ			0
	(Japan) Kazuki Watanabe	Yamaha														DNS				0
	(United Kingdom) Toby Markham	Yamaha								DNS										0
	(Italy) Stefano Bianco	Gilera													C					0
	(Italy) Stefano Bianco	Aprilia															DNQ			0
	(United States) Barrett Long	Yamaha													C					0
	(United States) Kyle Ferris	Yamaha													DNQ					0
	(Portugal) Sérgio Batista	Honda			DNQ															0
Pos	Rider	Bike	QAT (Qatar)	SPA (Spain)	POR (Portugal)	CHN (China)	FRA (France)	ITA (Italy)	CAT (Catalonia)	GBR (United Kingdom)	NED (Netherlands)	GER (Germany)	CZE (Czech Republic)	SMR (San Marino)	INP (Indianapolis)	JPN (Japan)	AUS (Australia)	MAL (Malaysia)	VAL (Valencian Community)	Pts

Colour	Result
Gold	Winner
Silver	Second place
Bronze	Third place
Green	Points classification
Blue	Non-points classification
Blue	Non-classified finish (NC)
Purple	Retired, not classified (Ret)
Red	Did not qualify (DNQ)
Red	Did not pre-qualify (DNPQ)
Black	Disqualified (DSQ)
White	Did not start (DNS)
White	Withdrew (WD)
White	Race cancelled (C)
Blank	Did not practice (DNP)
Blank	Did not arrive (DNA)
Blank	Excluded (EX)

**Bold** – Pole position
Italics – Fastest lap

==== Constructors' standings ====
- Each constructor got the same number of points as their best placed rider in each race.
- Rounds marked with a light blue background were under wet race conditions or stopped by rain.

Pos	Constructor	QAT (Qatar)	SPA (Spain)	POR (Portugal)	CHN (China)	FRA (France)	ITA (Italy)	CAT (Catalonia)	GBR (United Kingdom)	NED (Netherlands)	GER (Germany)	CZE (Czech Republic)	SMR (San Marino)	INP (Indianapolis)	JPN (Japan)	AUS (Australia)	MAL (Malaysia)	VAL (Valencian Community)	Pts
1	(Italy) Aprilia	1	2	1	3	1	2	2	3	1	2	1	1	C	2	2	1	3	343
2	(Italy) Gilera	8	8	2	4	2	1	1	2	3	1	3	4	C	1	1	3	1	300
3	(Austria) KTM	3	1	3	1	5	4	7	1	6	4	5	5	C	4	3	2	5	245
4	(Japan) Honda	5	3	6	7	4	10	11	9	8	9	6	2	C	6	7	4	2	174
5	(Japan) Yamaha	17	16	19	15	Ret	17	18	19	19	19	19	16	C	18	17	18	19	1
Pos	Constructor	QAT (Qatar)	SPA (Spain)	POR (Portugal)	CHN (China)	FRA (France)	ITA (Italy)	CAT (Catalonia)	GBR (United Kingdom)	NED (Netherlands)	GER (Germany)	CZE (Czech Republic)	SMR (San Marino)	INP (Indianapolis)	JPN (Japan)	AUS (Australia)	MAL (Malaysia)	VAL (Valencian Community)	Pts

=== 125cc standings ===
Scoring system

Points were awarded to the top fifteen finishers. Rider had to finish the race to earn points.

Position	**1st**	**2nd**	**3rd**	**4th**	**5th**	**6th**	**7th**	**8th**	**9th**	**10th**	**11th**	**12th**	**13th**	**14th**	**15th**
Points	25	20	16	13	11	10	9	8	7	6	5	4	3	2	1

==== Riders' standings ====
- Rounds marked with a light blue background were under wet race conditions or stopped by rain.
- Riders marked with light blue background were eligible for Rookie of the Year awards.

Pos	Rider	Bike	QAT (Qatar)	SPA (Spain)	POR (Portugal)	CHN (China)	FRA (France)	ITA (Italy)	CAT (Catalonia)	GBR (United Kingdom)	NED (Netherlands)	GER (Germany)	CZE (Czech Republic)	SMR (San Marino)	INP (Indianapolis)	JPN (Japan)	AUS (Australia)	MAL (Malaysia)	VAL (Valencian Community)	Pts
1	(France) Mike Di Meglio	Derbi	4	9	7	2	1	4	1	2	7	1	2	Ret	10	**2**	**1**	5	3	264
2	(Italy) Simone Corsi	Aprilia	7	1	**1**	Ret	13	1	5	**5**	**3**	5	10	3	7	7	8	3	1	225
3	(Hungary) Gábor Talmácsi	Aprilia	12	Ret	6	3	14	2	3	Ret	1	**3**	**4**	**1**	14	3	3	1	**Ret**	206
4	(Germany) Stefan Bradl	Aprilia	3	4	8	5	6	10	4	Ret	12	2	1	Ret	3	1	2	Ret	Ret	187
5	(Spain) Nicolás Terol	Aprilia	10	2	3	8	3	7	Ret	18	9	7	5	5	1	5	Ret	9	2	176
6	(United Kingdom) Bradley Smith	Aprilia	**16**	**3**	Ret	**Ret**	2	5	14	10	5	4	6	2	8	Ret	Ret	2	4	150
7	(Spain) Joan Olivé	Derbi	2	Ret	2	6	8	9	Ret	7	2	Ret	3	12	12	4	14	7	Ret	142
8	(Germany) Sandro Cortese	Aprilia	11	10	10	16	11	8	8	9	4	6	7	7	5	6	6	4	5	141
9	(Spain) Pol Espargaró	Derbi	8	14	13	4	4	3	**2**	DNS		16	8	Ret	**2**	Ret	5	6	DNS	124
10	(Italy) Andrea Iannone	Aprilia	14	18	11	1	5	12	Ret	Ret	8	11	9	6	Ret	Ret	4	**10**	6	106
11	(United Kingdom) Scott Redding	Aprilia	5	7	21	Ret	Ret	14	6	1	Ret	8	11	Ret	4	8	10	Ret	8	105
12	(Spain) Sergio Gadea	Aprilia	1	Ret	9	Ret	**20**	6	9	4	Ret	Ret	12	10	18	9	Ret	12	Ret	83
13	(Spain) Marc Márquez	KTM		WD	18	12	Ret	19	10	3	Ret	9	Ret	4	6	Ret	9	DNS		63
14	(Spain) Esteve Rabat	KTM	24	12	Ret	11	17	25	DNS	11	6	DSQ	13	9	Ret	Ret	7	Ret	10	49
15	(United States) Stevie Bonsey	Aprilia	Ret	6	4	14	Ret	11	7	17	17	17	Ret	Ret	9	20	Ret	Ret	Ret	46
16	(Switzerland) Dominique Aegerter	Derbi	17	8	12	17	23	24	12	19	16	10	14	8	11	19	Ret	8	Ret	45
17	(Japan) Tomoyoshi Koyama	KTM	Ret	13	16	13	Ret	Ret	13	6	13	Ret	Ret	18	19	11		11	7	41
18	(Italy) Raffaele De Rosa	KTM	Ret	11	Ret	9	9	**13**	Ret	14	10	Ret	Ret	Ret	13	12	Ret	Ret	Ret	37
19	(United Kingdom) Danny Webb	Aprilia	6	Ret	5	Ret	21	Ret	11	Ret		Ret	Ret	14	15	10	DNS	Ret	Ret	35
20	(Spain) Efrén Vázquez	Aprilia	9	Ret	15	10	Ret	18	16	WD	Ret	15	18	11	20	14	11	DNS	12	31
21	(Spain) Pablo Nieto	KTM	18	5	Ret	DNS	Ret	Ret	Ret	Ret	20	14	16	Ret	Ret	18	13	14	9	25
22	(Italy) Lorenzo Zanetti	KTM	21	Ret	Ret	Ret	7	20	Ret	15	Ret	Ret	19	Ret	30	17	12	13	11	22
23	(Austria) Michael Ranseder	Aprilia	15	16	14	7	Ret	15	17	12	14	Ret	21	13	Ret	Ret	DNQ			22
24	(Japan) Takaaki Nakagami	Aprilia	19	15	19	Ret	16	16	22	8	Ret	18	Ret	19	Ret	13	Ret	Ret	16	12
25	(Switzerland) Randy Krummenacher	KTM	22	WD		Ret	10	17	15	13	19	Ret	23	26			21	19	17	10
26	(Spain) Pere Tutusaus	Aprilia	20	19	22	15	12	21	19	22	21	12	20						Ret	9
27	(Italy) Stefano Bianco	Aprilia	13	Ret	17	DNS	Ret	Ret	18	20	11									8
28	(France) Alexis Masbou	Loncin	Ret	21	20	Ret	15	27	Ret	Ret	23	20	26	Ret	26	15	Ret	Ret	14	4
29	(Italy) Lorenzo Savadori	Aprilia						22						Ret					13	3
30	(Germany) Marcel Schrötter	Honda										13								3
31	(Germany) Robin Lässer	Aprilia	23	DNS		Ret	Ret	28	Ret	21	22	Ret	15	20	17	23	15	20	Ret	2
32	(Spain) Enrique Jerez	KTM															19	Ret	15	1
33	(Spain) Adrián Martín	Aprilia												Ret		25	17	15	Ret	1
34	(Germany) Jonas Folger	KTM											Ret	15	24	16		17	18	1
35	(Netherlands) Hugo van den Berg	Aprilia	Ret	Ret	Ret	19	Ret	29	21	25	15	Ret	25	24	21	Ret	Ret	Ret	Ret	1
	(France) Jules Cluzel	Loncin	Ret	17	Ret	DNS		23	20	16	18	Ret	24	16	16	Ret	Ret	16	19	0
	(Italy) Marco Ravaioli	Aprilia										23	22	17	Ret	21	16	18	20	0
	(Czech Republic) Lukáš Šembera	Aprilia											17							0
	(France) Louis Rossi	Honda	25	24	WD	18	19	32	25	23	24	21	29	23					23	0
	(Italy) Roberto Lacalendola	Aprilia	Ret	20	DNS	Ret	18	Ret	23	27	Ret									0
	(France) Cyril Carrillo	Honda			25		Ret								28	26	18	DNS		0
	(Germany) Marvin Fritz	Seel										19								0
	(Australia) Jed Metcher	Honda															20			0
	(Romania) Robert Mureșan	Aprilia	Ret	26	24	Ret	22	34	24	24	25	22	27		25	Ret	Ret	22	21	0
	(Switzerland) Bastien Chesaux	Aprilia										Ret	28	22	23	Ret	Ret	21	22	0
	(Italy) Gabriele Ferro	Honda						31						21						0
	(Spain) Iván Maestro	Honda		22																0
	(Spain) Iván Maestro	Aprilia			27				Ret											0
	(Japan) Yuuichi Yanagisawa	Honda														22				0
	(United States) PJ Jacobsen	Aprilia													22					0
	(Spain) Daniel Sáez	Aprilia		23					27										24	0
	(Italy) Dino Lombardi	Aprilia	Ret		23															0
	(Germany) Tobias Siegert	Aprilia					Ret					24								0
	(Japan) Hiroki Ono	Honda														24				0
	(Italy) Luca Vitali	Aprilia						30						25						0
	(Spain) Cristian Trabalón	Aprilia																	25	0
	(Spain) Alberto Moncayo	Derbi		25																0
	(Spain) Axel Pons	Aprilia		Ret	26				Ret											0
	(Spain) Ricard Cardús	Derbi							26										Ret	0
	(Italy) Riccardo Moretti	Honda						26						Ret						0
	(Netherlands) Michael van der Mark	Honda									26									0
	(United Kingdom) Lee Costello	Honda								26										0
	(Italy) Davide Stirpe	KTM													27					0
	(Sweden) Robert Gull	Derbi									27									0
	(Czech Republic) Karel Pešek	Aprilia			28								Ret							0
	(Netherlands) Jasper Iwema	Seel									28									0
	(United States) Kristian Lee Turner	Aprilia													29					0
	(Netherlands) Ernst Dubbink	Honda									29									0
	(Czech Republic) Michal Prášek	Aprilia											30							0
	(Netherlands) Jerry van de Bunt	Aprilia									30									0
	(Czech Republic) Andrea Toušková	Honda											31							0
	(Italy) Ferruccio Lamborghini	Aprilia						33												0
	(Spain) Julián Miralles	Aprilia																	DSQ	0
	(Australia) Rhys Moller	Honda															Ret			0
	(Australia) Brad Gross	Yamaha															Ret			0
	(Japan) Kazuma Watanabe	Honda														Ret				0
	(Japan) Iori Namihira	Honda														Ret				0
	(Japan) Hiroomi Iwata	Honda														Ret				0
	(Italy) Gennaro Sabatino	Aprilia												Ret						0
	(Germany) Sebastian Kreuziger	Honda										Ret								0
	(Germany) Eric Hübsch	Aprilia										Ret								0
	(Netherlands) Joey Litjens	Seel									Ret									0
	(United Kingdom) Matthew Hoyle	Honda								Ret										0
	(United Kingdom) Connor Behan	Honda								Ret										0
	(Republic of Ireland) Paul Jordan	Honda								Ret										0
	(United Kingdom) Luke Hinton	Honda								Ret										0
	(Spain) Jordi Dalmau	Honda							Ret											0
	(France) Steven Le Coquen	Honda					Ret													0
	(Italy) Gioele Pellino	Loncin					Ret													0
	(France) Valentin Debise	KTM					DNS													0
	(Australia) Blake Leigh-Smith	Honda															DNQ			0
	(Australia) Jake Horne	Honda															DNQ			0
Pos	Rider	Bike	QAT (Qatar)	SPA (Spain)	POR (Portugal)	CHN (China)	FRA (France)	ITA (Italy)	CAT (Catalonia)	GBR (United Kingdom)	NED (Netherlands)	GER (Germany)	CZE (Czech Republic)	SMR (San Marino)	INP (Indianapolis)	JPN (Japan)	AUS (Australia)	MAL (Malaysia)	VAL (Valencian Community)	Pts

Colour	Result
Gold	Winner
Silver	Second place
Bronze	Third place
Green	Points classification
Blue	Non-points classification
Blue	Non-classified finish (NC)
Purple	Retired, not classified (Ret)
Red	Did not qualify (DNQ)
Red	Did not pre-qualify (DNPQ)
Black	Disqualified (DSQ)
White	Did not start (DNS)
White	Withdrew (WD)
White	Race cancelled (C)
Blank	Did not practice (DNP)
Blank	Did not arrive (DNA)
Blank	Excluded (EX)

**Bold** – Pole position
Italics – Fastest lap

==== Constructors' standings ====
Pos	Constructor	QAT (Qatar)	SPA (Spain)	POR (Portugal)	CHN (China)	FRA (France)	ITA (Italy)	CAT (Catalonia)	GBR (United Kingdom)	NED (Netherlands)	GER (Germany)	CZE (Czech Republic)	SMR (San Marino)	INP (Indianapolis)	JPN (Japan)	AUS (Australia)	MAL (Malaysia)	VAL (Valencian Community)	Pts
1	(Italy) Aprilia	1	1	1	1	2	1	3	1	1	2	1	1	1	1	2	1	1	401
2	(Spain) Derbi	2	8	2	2	1	3	1	2	2	1	2	8	2	2	1	5	3	319
3	(Austria) KTM	18	5	16	9	7	13	10	3	6	9	13	4	6	11	7	11	7	123
4	(China) Loncin	Ret	17	20	Ret	15	23	20	16	18	20	24	16	16	15	Ret	16	14	4
5	(Japan) Honda	25	22	25	18	19	26	25	23	24	13	29	21	28	22	18	DNS	23	3
	(Germany) Seel									28	19								0
	(Japan) Yamaha															Ret			0
Pos	Constructor	QAT (Qatar)	SPA (Spain)	POR (Portugal)	CHN (China)	FRA (France)	ITA (Italy)	CAT (Catalonia)	GBR (United Kingdom)	NED (Netherlands)	GER (Germany)	CZE (Czech Republic)	SMR (San Marino)	INP (Indianapolis)	JPN (Japan)	AUS (Australia)	MAL (Malaysia)	VAL (Valencian Community)	Pts
