= Blake Leigh-Smith =

Australian motorcycle racer

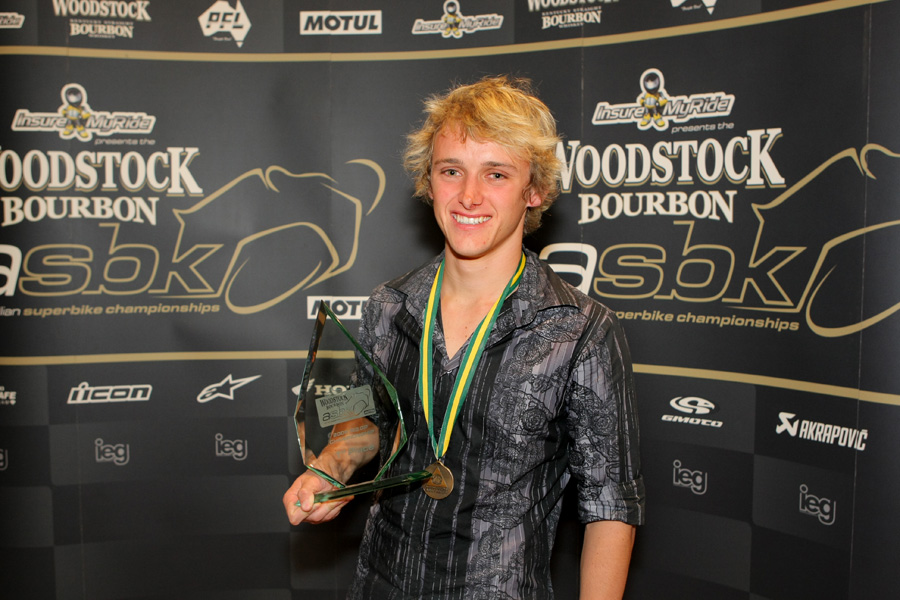
- Leigh-Smith in 2009
- Nationality: Australian
- Born: 5 February 1990 (age 36); Southport, Australia
Motorcycle racing career statistics
Moto2 World Championship
Active years	2011
Manufacturers	FTR
Starts / Wins / Podiums / Poles / F. laps / Points; 1 / 0 / 0 / 0 / 0 / 0
125cc World Championship
Active years	2005–2009
Manufacturers	Honda, KTM
Starts / Wins / Podiums / Poles / F. laps / Points; 7 / 0 / 0 / 0 / 0 / 0

Blake Leigh-Smith (born 5 February 1990) is an Australian motorcycle racer. In 2009 he won the Australian 125 GP Championship. His brother, Jackson Leigh-Smith, is also a motorcycle racer.

== Career statistics ==
=== Grand Prix motorcycle racing ===
==== By season ====
Season	Class	Motorcycle	Team	Race	Win	Podium	Pole	FLap	Pts	Plcd
2005	125cc	Honda	Leigh-Smith Racing	1	0	0	0	0	0	NC
2006	125cc	KTM	Red Bull KTM Junior Team	1	0	0	0	0	0	NC
2006	125cc	Honda	KRP	4	0	0	0	0	0	NC
2007	125cc	Honda	Leigh-Smith Racing	0	0	0	0	0	0	NC
2008	125cc	Honda	Leigh-Smith Racing	0	0	0	0	0	0	NC
2009	125cc	Honda	Degraaf Grand Prix	1	0	0	0	0	0	NC
2011	Moto2	FTR	BRP Racing	1	0	0	0	0	0	NC
Total				8	0	0	0	0	0	

==== Races by year ====
(key)

Year	Class	Bike	1	2	3	4	5	6	7	8	9	10	11	12	13	14	15	16	17	Pos.	Pts
2005	125cc	Honda	SPA	POR	CHN	FRA	ITA	CAT	NED	GBR	GER	CZE	JPN	MAL	QAT	AUS; 28	TUR	VAL		NC	0
2006	125cc	Honda	SPA	QAT	TUR	CHN	FRA	ITA	CAT	NED	GBR; 31	GER	CZE	MAL						NC	0
2006	125cc	KTM													AUS; 27	JPN; 22	POR; 27	VAL; 32		NC	0
2007	125cc	Honda	QAT	SPA	TUR	CHN	FRA	ITA	CAT	GBR	NED	GER	CZE	RSM	POR	JPN	AUS; DNQ	MAL	VAL	NC	0
2008	125cc	Honda	QAT	SPA	POR	CHN	FRA	ITA	CAT	GBR	NED	GER	CZE	RSM	INP	JPN	AUS; DNQ	MAL	VAL	NC	0
2009	125cc	Honda	QAT	JPN	SPA	FRA	ITA	CAT	NED	GER	GBR	CZE	INP	RSM	POR	AUS	MAL; 21	VAL		NC	0
2011	Moto2	FTR	QAT	SPA	POR	FRA	CAT	GBR	NED	ITA	GER	CZE	INP	RSM	ARA	JPN	AUS; 27	MAL	VAL	NC	0
