= Sebastian Kreuziger =

German motorcycle racer

- Nationality: German
- Born: 7 November 1991 (age 35); Ammerndorf, Germany
- Bike number: 31

Sebastian Kreuziger (born 7 November 1991) is a Grand Prix motorcycle racer from Germany.

== Career statistics ==
=== By season ===
| Season | Class | Motorcycle | Team | Number | Race | Win | Podium | Pole | FLap | Pts | Plcd |
|---|---|---|---|---|---|---|---|---|---|---|---|
| 2008 | 125cc | Aprilia | RZT-Racing | 88 | 1 | 0 | 0 | 0 | 0 | 0 | NC |
| Total | | | | | 1 | 0 | 0 | 0 | 0 | 0 | |

==== Races by year ====
(key)

| Year | Class | Bike | 1 | 2 | 3 | 4 | 5 | 6 | 7 | 8 | 9 | 10 | 11 | 12 | 13 | 14 | 15 | 16 | 17 | Pos. | Pts |
|---|---|---|---|---|---|---|---|---|---|---|---|---|---|---|---|---|---|---|---|---|---|
| 2008 | 125cc | Honda | QAT | SPA | POR | CHN | FRA | ITA | CAT | GBR | NED | GER; Ret | CZE | RSM | INP | JPN | AUS | MAL | VAL | NC | 0 |
