= KTM 125 FRR =

Racing motorcycle

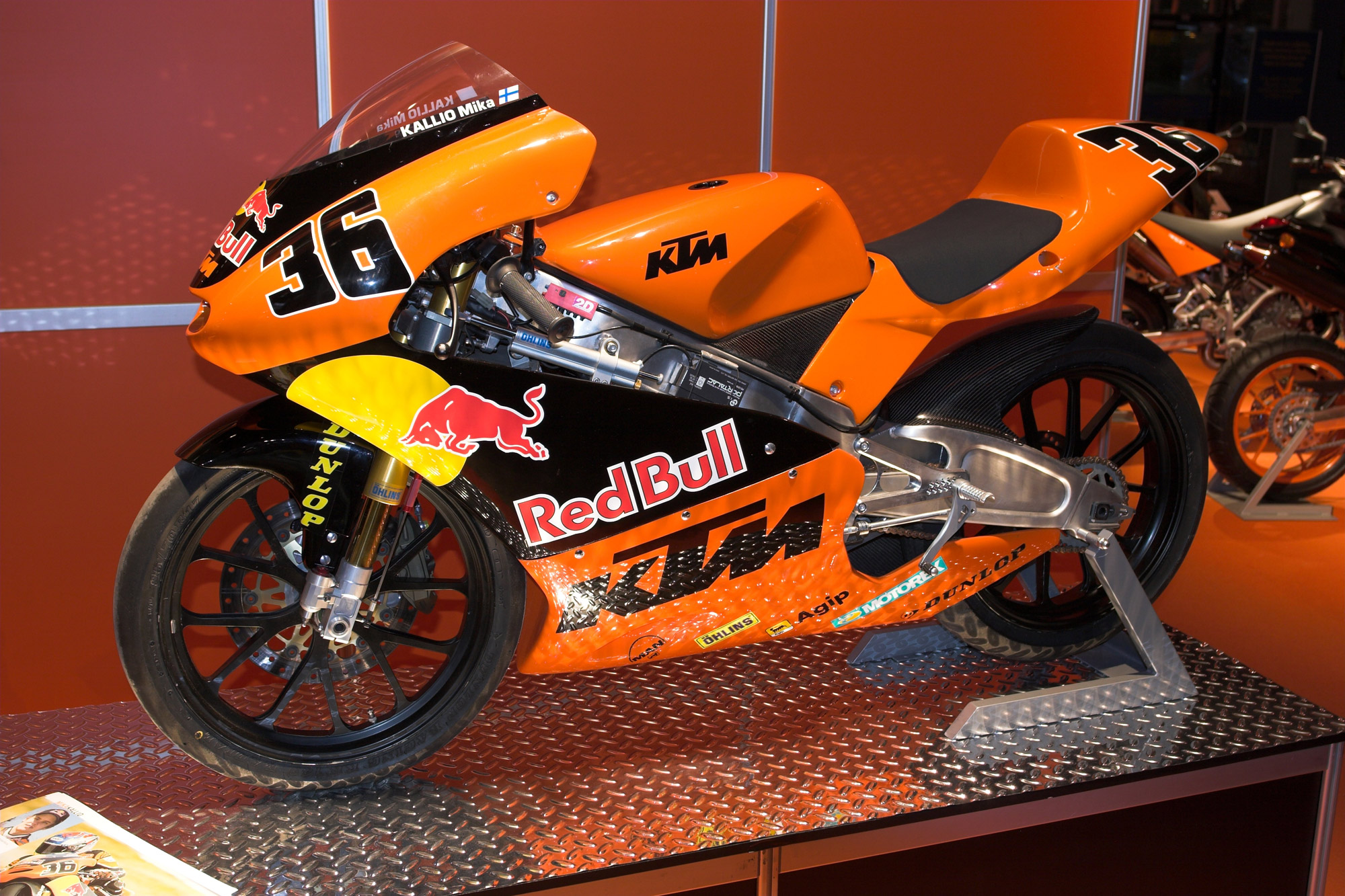
- Manufacturer: KTM
- Production: 2003–2011
- Successor: KTM RC250GP
- Class: 125cc
- Engine: 124.8 cc (7.62 cu in) two-stroke single cylinder
- Bore / stroke: 54 mm × 54.5 mm (2.13 in × 2.15 in)
- Compression ratio: 9:1
- Power: 55 hp (41 kW) @ 13,000 rpm
- Transmission: Chain
- Weight: 76 kg (dry)
- Fuel capacity: About 13 Liters
- Related: KTM 250 FRR

The KTM 125 FRR was a racing motorcycle made by KTM, which was used in the 125cc class of Grand Prix motorcycle racing from 2003 until 2011. The bike has been replaced by the KTM RC250GP from 2012 onwards.

== History ==
When the bike originally debuted in 2003, it was equipped with a single-cylinder 2-stroke engine as per class regulations at the time.

== Season progress ==
=== 2003 ===
In its debut year, the bike was ridden by the official 125cc KTM factory team. Previous year's world championship Arnaud Vincent was brought on board to drive for the team, but he was replaced only after nine races by the Finn Mika Kallio instead. The reason for this change was that the Frenchman was unrealistic about what could be achieved that year - although he rarely voiced such criticism in public. The other rider to partner Vincent and later Kallio was the Italian Roberto Locatelli.

In February 2003, it was announced that Locatelli and KTM would not attend the IRTA tests in Jerez due to delays in the production of their 125 FRR machine During the tests in April 2003, the KTM team said it 'needed more time' to improve their form and pace.

The team frequently struggled during the season, but the high point came late in the season when Kallio scored its first podium in the form of second place at the 2003 Malaysian Grand Prix.

Overall, the team scored 66 points, getting a best-place finish of second, and finished fourth in the constructors championship.

=== 2004 ===
The following year, the driver line-up of the team had changed. Locatelli had been replaced by a young Casey Stoner with Mika Kallio staying on board for another year. A new KTM Junior team was created, with the Austrian Michael Ranseder riding on two wildcard appearances for the team.

Thanks to Casey Stoner, the team did exponentially better than last year. He scored a third place for the team at the opening round in South Africa, improving this result at the Italian GP when he narrowly lost out on victory to Roberto Locatelli. By round 6 in the Netherlands, Stoner had scored KTM's first ever pole position on Friday yet another podium on Saturday, this time in the form of third place. The best result of the year came at the 2004 Malaysian Grand Prix when he won the race, narrowly beating out eventual champion Andrea Dovizioso by only 0.029 seconds. He then scored his final podium of the year at the penultimate round in Australia, finishing third in front of his home crowd. Mika Kallio was less consistent, but still managed to score a second place podium - his only of the year - being narrowly beaten by Héctor Barberá at the Portuguese round.

The team scored 204 points, seven podiums - one of which was a victory - and finished third in the constructors championship.

=== 2005 ===
As the team announced that they were going to build a 250cc machine for 2005, Casey Stoner announced he left the team to move up to the 250cc class himself. The new line-up for this year was expanded from two to three riders and consisted of the Hungarian Gábor Talmácsi and the Spaniard Julián Simón, Mika Kallio staying with the team for the third consecutive year. The KTM Junior team consisted out of wildcard riders Michael Ranseder and Stefan Bradl.

2005 proved to be a good year for the team. Despite none of the drivers winning any world championships, they scored a lot of points and Mika Kallio became vice-world champion, behind Thomas Lüthi, by just five points. Talmácsi claimed third and Simón seventh place in their debut years for the team respectively.

Kallio started the season off well by scoring a second place podium for the team at the season opener in Spain. At the next race in Portugal, he took the first KTM pole of the year on Saturday and won the race on Sunday by narrowly beating Héctor Faubel by just 0.008 seconds. He repeated the feat in China but it was teammate Gábor Talmácsi who impressed this time, finishing third where Kallio only finished eleventh. Kallio took fastest lap and third place at the French round, and took five consecutives pole positions from Italy to Germany. However, Kallio retired in two of these races (Italy and the Netherlands, Talmácsi winning both of them instead, and Kallio only managing third at the Catalan GP. At the wet British race, Julián Simón surprised everyone by winning his first and only race of the season. In Germany, it was Kallio once more who won KTM's fifth race of the season.

After the summer break, Kallio continued to impress and fight for the title. He finished second in the Czech Republic, won again in Japan and finished second twice in Malaysia and Qatar, scoring another pole in the process on Saturday. Talmácsi's form was not as good after the summer break, but he bounced back by winning the race in Qatar and finishing second at the final race in Valencia, Kallio winning it but just missing out on the drivers title.

Overall, the team scored 332 points and became constructors champions for the first time in the 125cc and scored 16 podiums, 8 of which were victories.

=== 2006 ===
After an exceptionally good year in 2005, fortunes would be less good for the KTM team in 2006, despite still winning races. Gábor Talmácsi left the team and the driver line-up consisted of Mika Kallio and Julián Simón, who both stayed with the team. The Swiss Randy Krummenacher was also brought as a replacement rider. The KTM Junior team consisted out of Michael Ranseder, Stefan Bradl and replacement rider Blake Leigh-Smith. The Red Bull ADAC KTM Junior team (which was a wildcard team) consisted out of Randy Krummenacher and Robin Lässer.

Kallio scored the first podium of the season for the team in Qatar and won the Chinese race - beating Mattia Pasini by just 0.097 seconds - after scoring his first podium on Saturday. At the next race in France, he finished in second place. In the Netherlands, he won the second race of the season, beating the Spaniard Sergio Gadea to the line by 0.122 seconds, also taking the second pole of the season on Saturday. In Great Britain, he finished a distant second.

After the summer break, Kallio finished all the remaining six races on the podium. In the Czech Republic, Malaysia and Australia he finished second after taking pole on Saturday in Brno and Phillip Island, in Japan he narrowly won ahead of Álvaro Bautista with KTM teammate Julián Simón finishing on the podium for the first and only time of the season, in Portugal he finished third and at the final race in Valencia.

The team scored 267 points, twelve podiums - three of which were victories - and finished second in the constructors championship.

=== 2007 ===
For 2007, KTM decided to reduce its direct commitment to grand prix racing, which took place through the main team supported by a Junior team, preferring to dedicate itself to organizing a single-brand training event called the Red Bull MotoGP Rookies Cup.

The driver line-up changed once more this year. Kallio left the 125cc KTM team and signed with the 250cc KTM team and Simón did likewise. The team now consisted out of Randy Krummenacher, American rookie Stevie Bonsey and experienced Japanese rider Tomoyoshi Koyama.

KTM struggled more than last year, but still managed to score semi-frequent podiums during this period. Koyama scored his first ever third place podium in Turkey, a feat he bettered when he won KTM's first and only race of the season in Catalunya - narrowly defeating Gábor Talmácsi by just 0.049 seconds. Krummenacher also scored his first and only podium in third place, picking up the fastest lap as well. At the next round in Great Britain, he took second place and did likewise in Germany.

After the summer break, Koyama continued to impress. He scored a third place podium in San Marino and took his final podium of the season at the penultimate round in Malaysia, finishing third in the championship overall.

The team scored 196 points, seven podiums - one of which was a victory - and finished third in the constructors championship.

=== 2008 ===
For the 2008 season, privateer teams started using KTM machinery for the first time. The Red Bull KTM driver line-up did not change bar the departure of Stevie Bonsey. Krummenacher and Koyama stayed on, the latter being a wildcard rider this time. Replacement rider Jonas Folger was also brought on. The Repsol KTM driver line-up consisted out of Tito Rabat and a young Marc Márquez.

KTM started to slip down the order as they began to struggle more and more this year. The only high point was a third-place finish that British race. At the end of the 2008 world championship, KERS was installed, making the team the first to use such a solution in grand prix motorcycle racing.

Overall, the team scored 123 points, one podium and finished third in the constructors championship.

=== 2009 ===
This year marked the last one as an official Factory entry, as KTM had decided to withdraw its efforts at the end of the 2009 season. However, the bikes would continue to be used by privateers until at least 2011.

The driver line-up had changed slightly for this final year, with Marc Márquez staying but Krummenacher and Koyama leaving. American rookie Cameron Beaubier and Norwegian wildcard rider Sturla Fagerhaug were also brought on board for this season.

KTM was still struggling this year, its only high point being the third place podium Márquez grabbed at round 3 in Spain.

Overall, the team scored 96 points, one podium and finished third in the constructors championship.

=== 2010 ===
Even though the Factory KTM team left the 125cc class in 2009, the bikes continued to be used by one privateer team - the Freudenberg Racing Team - in 2010. Its wildcard riders however, failed to score any podiums, only scored 6 points and KTM finished fourth in the constructors championship.

=== 2011 ===
2011 marked the final year for the FRR model. It was used by two teams, the Caretta Technology and Freudenberg Racing Team, but none of the riders managed to score any podiums, together managed 29 points and finished fourth in the constructors championship.

== Specifications ==
KTM 125 FRR Specifications (2008)
Engine
Engine type:	Single-cylinder, 2-stroke
Displacement:	124.8 cm^{3} (Bore 54 x Stroke 54.5 mm)
Ignition:	Digital CDI with battery
Fuel System:	
Fuel:	
Lubricants:	
Lubrication system:	
Data recording:	
Maximum power:	Approximately 38 hp at 13.000 RPM
Maximum speed:	
Exhaust:	
Transmission
Type:	6-speed
Primary drive:	Gear
Clutch:	Dry multi-disc
Final drive:	Chain
Chassis and running gear
Frame type:	Double inclined beam, in aluminum
Front suspension:	Fully adjustable Öhlins upside down fork
Rear suspension:	Fully adjustable Öhlins shock absorber
Front/rear wheels:	Marchesini rims
Front/rear tyres:	Front: 17" / Rear: 17" Dunlop tyres
Front brake:	Single carbon steel disc from Brembo caliper with 4 differentiated diameter pistons
Rear brake:	Single disc with Brembo 2-piston caliper
Weight:	136 kg / 300 lbs (with pilot)
Fuel capacity:	About 13 Liters

== See also ==
- Aprilia RS125R
