= Aprilia RS125R =

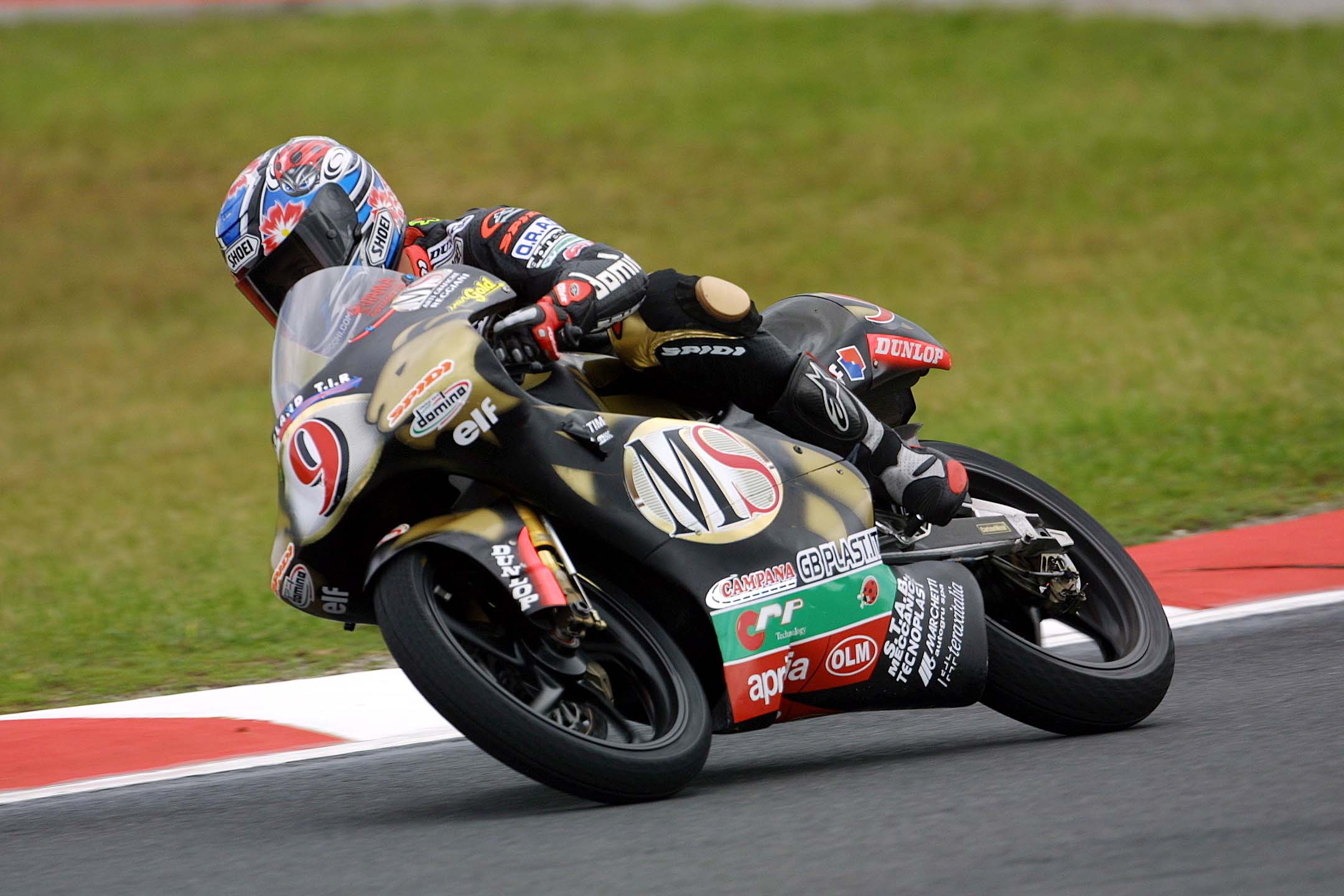
- Manufacturer: Aprilia
- Production: 1991-2011
- Predecessor: Aprilia AF1 250
- Engine: 125 cc two-stroke engine
- Weight: 115kg (dry)

The Aprilia RS125R is a race motorcycle manufactured by Aprilia to race in the Grand Prix motorcycle World Championship, built to replace the old Aprilia AF1 250. It was debuted in 1991, and it had many upgrades since. The bike won ten World Championships (one rebranded as Derbi and one as Gilera).

In 1991 the original tank was 12 liters, which became 13 in 1994 and 14 in 1995; the original carburetor was a Dell'Orto VHSB 39, which was upgraded to a Dell'Orto VHSD 41 in 1996 and to a Dell'Orto VHSG 42 in 2006.

Since 1996 the brake specification has gone from a single front brake disc 300 mm in carbon steel to a single brake in carbon, with a diameter of 275 mm disc; in 2000 the bike returned to a double disc front braking system .

Since 2007, the bike is available in a new version called RSA 125. The RSA has many new details than the previous model, including improvements in the intake system and the engine. The old version, with some updates from the RSA, is still used as a customer bike and it is called the RS 125 LE.

The RSA (and the "evolution" version of the RS 125) are used not only by Aprilia, but also by Gilera and Derbi (rebranded as such), since all three brands belong to the Piaggio group.

== See also ==
- KTM 125 FRR
- Aprilia RS125
