= 2008 German motorcycle Grand Prix =

Coordinates: 50°47′29.3″N 12°41′19.4″E

(Germany) 2008 German Grand Prix
Race details
- Race 10 of 18 races in the 2008 Grand Prix motorcycle racing season
- Date: 13 July 2008
- Official name: Alice Motorrad Grand Prix Deutschland
- Location: Sachsenring
- Course: Permanent racing facility; 3.671 km (2.281 mi)

MotoGP
Pole position
- Rider: (Australia) Casey Stoner
- Time: 1:21.067
Fastest lap
- Rider: (Australia) Casey Stoner
- Time: 1:32.749
Podium
- First: (Australia) Casey Stoner
- Second: (Italy) Valentino Rossi
- Third: (Australia) Chris Vermeulen

250cc
Pole position
- Rider: (Italy) Marco Simoncelli
- Time: 1:23.399
Fastest lap
- Rider: (Spain) Héctor Barberá
- Time: 1:32.551
Podium
- First: (Italy) Marco Simoncelli
- Second: (Spain) Héctor Barberá
- Third: (Spain) Álvaro Bautista

125cc
Pole position
- Rider: (Hungary) Gábor Talmácsi
- Time: 1:27.552
Fastest lap
- Rider: (France) Mike Di Meglio
- Time: 1:27.584
Podium
- First: (France) Mike Di Meglio
- Second: (Germany) Stefan Bradl
- Third: (Hungary) Gábor Talmácsi

The 2008 German motorcycle Grand Prix was the tenth round of the 2008 MotoGP season. It took place on the weekend of 11–13 July 2008 at the Sachsenring, located in Hohenstein-Ernstthal, Germany.

== MotoGP classification ==
| Pos. | No. | Rider | Team | Manufacturer | Laps | Time/Retired | Grid | Points |
|---|---|---|---|---|---|---|---|---|
| 1 | 1 | (Australia) Casey Stoner | Ducati Marlboro Team | Ducati | 30 | 47:30.057 | 1 | 25 |
| 2 | 46 | (Italy) Valentino Rossi | Fiat Yamaha Team | Yamaha | 30 | +3.708 | 7 | 20 |
| 3 | 7 | (Australia) Chris Vermeulen | Rizla Suzuki MotoGP | Suzuki | 30 | +14.002 | 14 | 16 |
| 4 | 15 | (San Marino) Alex de Angelis | San Carlo Honda Gresini | Honda | 30 | +14.124 | 10 | 13 |
| 5 | 4 | (Italy) Andrea Dovizioso | JiR Team Scot MotoGP | Honda | 30 | +42.022 | 4 | 11 |
| 6 | 50 | (France) Sylvain Guintoli | Alice Team | Ducati | 30 | +46.648 | 15 | 10 |
| 7 | 65 | (Italy) Loris Capirossi | Rizla Suzuki MotoGP | Suzuki | 30 | +1:04.483 | 13 | 9 |
| 8 | 14 | (France) Randy de Puniet | LCR Honda MotoGP | Honda | 30 | +1:04.588 | 6 | 8 |
| 9 | 56 | (Japan) Shinya Nakano | San Carlo Honda Gresini | Honda | 30 | +1:16.773 | 9 | 7 |
| 10 | 13 | (Australia) Anthony West | Kawasaki Racing Team | Kawasaki | 30 | +1:29.275 | 17 | 6 |
| 11 | 52 | (United Kingdom) James Toseland | Tech 3 Yamaha | Yamaha | 29 | +1 lap | 11 | 5 |
| 12 | 24 | (Spain) Toni Elías | Alice Team | Ducati | 29 | +1 lap | 12 | 4 |
| 13 | 69 | (United States) Nicky Hayden | Repsol Honda Team | Honda | 28 | +2 laps | 8 | 3 |
| Ret | 5 | (United States) Colin Edwards | Tech 3 Yamaha | Yamaha | 20 | Accident | 3 | |
| Ret | 33 | (Italy) Marco Melandri | Ducati Marlboro Team | Ducati | 9 | Accident | 16 | |
| Ret | 2 | (Spain) Dani Pedrosa | Repsol Honda Team | Honda | 5 | Accident | 2 | |
| Ret | 48 | (Spain) Jorge Lorenzo | Fiat Yamaha Team | Yamaha | 2 | Accident | 5 | |

== 250 cc classification ==
| Pos. | No. | Rider | Manufacturer | Laps | Time/Retired | Grid | Points |
|---|---|---|---|---|---|---|---|
| 1 | 58 | (Italy) Marco Simoncelli | Gilera | 29 | 45:36.703 | 1 | 25 |
| 2 | 21 | (Spain) Héctor Barberá | Aprilia | 29 | +2.257 | 3 | 20 |
| 3 | 19 | (Spain) Álvaro Bautista | Aprilia | 29 | +2.423 | 5 | 16 |
| 4 | 36 | (Finland) Mika Kallio | KTM | 29 | +4.150 | 4 | 13 |
| 5 | 60 | (Spain) Julián Simón | KTM | 29 | +4.846 | 2 | 11 |
| 6 | 75 | (Italy) Mattia Pasini | Aprilia | 29 | +8.132 | 13 | 10 |
| 7 | 12 | (Switzerland) Thomas Lüthi | Aprilia | 29 | +38.302 | 14 | 9 |
| 8 | 4 | (Japan) Hiroshi Aoyama | KTM | 29 | +48.926 | 9 | 8 |
| 9 | 72 | (Japan) Yuki Takahashi | Honda | 29 | +50.062 | 10 | 7 |
| 10 | 15 | (Italy) Roberto Locatelli | Gilera | 29 | +51.670 | 8 | 6 |
| 11 | 25 | (Italy) Alex Baldolini | Aprilia | 29 | +1:08.796 | 21 | 5 |
| 12 | 32 | (Italy) Fabrizio Lai | Gilera | 29 | +1:08.962 | 7 | 4 |
| 13 | 41 | (Spain) Aleix Espargaró | Aprilia | 29 | +1:11.351 | 12 | 3 |
| 14 | 55 | (Spain) Héctor Faubel | Aprilia | 29 | +1:11.654 | 11 | 2 |
| 15 | 50 | (Republic of Ireland) Eugene Laverty | Aprilia | 29 | +1:13.856 | 19 | 1 |
| 16 | 14 | (Thailand) Ratthapark Wilairot | Honda | 29 | +1:29.976 | 17 | |
| 17 | 10 | (Hungary) Imre Tóth | Aprilia | 28 | +1 lap | 22 | |
| 18 | 93 | (Hungary) Alen Győrfi | Honda | 28 | +1 lap | 26 | |
| 19 | 45 | (Indonesia) Doni Tata Pradita | Yamaha | 28 | +1 lap | 24 | |
| 20 | 94 | (Germany) Toni Wirsing | Honda | 27 | +2 laps | 25 | |
| Ret | 90 | (Italy) Federico Sandi | Aprilia | 22 | Accident | 18 | |
| Ret | 52 | (Czech Republic) Lukáš Pešek | Aprilia | 18 | Accident | 15 | |
| Ret | 17 | (Czech Republic) Karel Abraham | Aprilia | 3 | Accident | 16 | |
| Ret | 6 | (Spain) Alex Debón | Aprilia | 3 | Retirement | 6 | |
| Ret | 7 | (Spain) Russell Gómez | Aprilia | 0 | Accident | 23 | |
| DNS | 54 | (San Marino) Manuel Poggiali | Gilera | 0 | Did not start | 20 | |
| DNQ | 89 | (China) Ho Wan Chow | Aprilia | | Did not qualify | | |
OFFICIAL 250cc REPORT

== 125 cc classification ==
| Pos. | No. | Rider | Manufacturer | Laps | Time/Retired | Grid | Points |
|---|---|---|---|---|---|---|---|
| 1 | 63 | (France) Mike Di Meglio | Derbi | 27 | 40:03.710 | 6 | 25 |
| 2 | 17 | (Germany) Stefan Bradl | Aprilia | 27 | +2.010 | 3 | 20 |
| 3 | 1 | (Hungary) Gábor Talmácsi | Aprilia | 27 | +2.733 | 1 | 16 |
| 4 | 38 | (United Kingdom) Bradley Smith | Aprilia | 27 | +2.847 | 2 | 13 |
| 5 | 24 | (Italy) Simone Corsi | Aprilia | 27 | +9.117 | 4 | 11 |
| 6 | 11 | (Germany) Sandro Cortese | Aprilia | 27 | +9.249 | 9 | 10 |
| 7 | 18 | (Spain) Nicolás Terol | Aprilia | 27 | +9.257 | 14 | 9 |
| 8 | 45 | (United Kingdom) Scott Redding | Aprilia | 27 | +30.778 | 16 | 8 |
| 9 | 93 | (Spain) Marc Márquez | KTM | 27 | +33.034 | 19 | 7 |
| 10 | 77 | (Switzerland) Dominique Aegerter | Derbi | 27 | +33.121 | 21 | 6 |
| 11 | 29 | (Italy) Andrea Iannone | Aprilia | 27 | +33.134 | 24 | 5 |
| 12 | 30 | (Spain) Pere Tutusaus | Aprilia | 27 | +33.171 | 31 | 4 |
| 13 | 87 | (Germany) Marcel Schrötter | Honda | 27 | +33.208 | 20 | 3 |
| 14 | 22 | (Spain) Pablo Nieto | KTM | 27 | +33.755 | 18 | 2 |
| 15 | 7 | (Spain) Efrén Vázquez | Aprilia | 27 | +34.554 | 23 | 1 |
| 16 | 44 | (Spain) Pol Espargaró | Derbi | 27 | +37.776 | 15 | |
| 17 | 51 | (United States) Stevie Bonsey | Aprilia | 27 | +37.872 | 13 | |
| 18 | 73 | (Japan) Takaaki Nakagami | Aprilia | 27 | +54.240 | 25 | |
| 19 | 85 | (Germany) Marvin Fritz | Seel | 27 | +58.249 | 30 | |
| 20 | 5 | (France) Alexis Masbou | Loncin | 27 | +1:14.202 | 33 | |
| 21 | 69 | (France) Louis Rossi | Honda | 27 | +1:15.255 | 39 | |
| 22 | 95 | (Romania) Robert Mureșan | Aprilia | 27 | +1:16.356 | 32 | |
| 23 | 72 | (Italy) Marco Ravaioli | Aprilia | 27 | +1:16.854 | 35 | |
| 24 | 41 | (Germany) Tobias Siegert | Aprilia | 26 | +1 lap | 37 | |
| DSQ | 12 | (Spain) Esteve Rabat | KTM | 27 | (+32.311) | 10 | |
| Ret | 8 | (Italy) Lorenzo Zanetti | KTM | 25 | Retirement | 27 | |
| Ret | 71 | (Japan) Tomoyoshi Koyama | KTM | 24 | Accident | 7 | |
| Ret | 35 | (Italy) Raffaele De Rosa | KTM | 22 | Retirement | 8 | |
| Ret | 16 | (France) Jules Cluzel | Loncin | 19 | Retirement | 26 | |
| Ret | 33 | (Spain) Sergio Gadea | Aprilia | 15 | Retirement | 12 | |
| Ret | 21 | (Germany) Robin Lässer | Aprilia | 15 | Retirement | 28 | |
| Ret | 6 | (Spain) Joan Olivé | Derbi | 14 | Retirement | 5 | |
| Ret | 88 | (Germany) Sebastian Kreuziger | Honda | 14 | Retirement | 34 | |
| Ret | 60 | (Austria) Michael Ranseder | Aprilia | 12 | Retirement | 22 | |
| Ret | 48 | (Switzerland) Bastien Chesaux | Aprilia | 9 | Retirement | 38 | |
| Ret | 99 | (United Kingdom) Danny Webb | Aprilia | 5 | Retirement | 11 | |
| Ret | 56 | (Netherlands) Hugo van den Berg | Aprilia | 4 | Retirement | 29 | |
| Ret | 34 | (Switzerland) Randy Krummenacher | KTM | 3 | Retirement | 17 | |
| Ret | 86 | (Germany) Eric Hübsch | Aprilia | 2 | Accident | 36 | |
OFFICIAL 125cc REPORT

== Championship standings after the race (MotoGP) ==
Below are the standings for the top five riders and constructors after round ten has concluded.

Riders' Championship standings

| Pos. | Rider | Points |
|---|---|---|
| 1 | (Italy) Valentino Rossi | 187 |
| 2 | (Spain) Dani Pedrosa | 171 |
| 3 | (Australia) Casey Stoner | 167 |
| 4 | (Spain) Jorge Lorenzo | 114 |
| 5 | (United States) Colin Edwards | 98 |

Constructors' Championship standings

| Pos. | Constructor | Points |
|---|---|---|
| 1 | (Japan) Yamaha | 216 |
| 2 | (Japan) Honda | 184 |
| 3 | (Italy) Ducati | 172 |
| 4 | (Japan) Suzuki | 96 |
| 5 | (Japan) Kawasaki | 47 |

- Note: Only the top five positions are included for both sets of standings.

| Previous race: 2008 Dutch TT | FIM Grand Prix World Championship; 2008 season | Next race: 2008 United States Grand Prix |
| Previous race: 2007 German Grand Prix | German motorcycle Grand Prix | Next race: 2009 German Grand Prix |
