= 2008 Czech Republic motorcycle Grand Prix =

2008 Czech Republic Grand Prix
Race details
- Race 12 of 18 races in the 2008 Grand Prix motorcycle racing season
- Date: 17 August 2008
- Official name: Cardion AB Grand Prix České republiky
- Location: Brno Circuit
- Course: Permanent racing facility; 5.403 km (3.357 mi)

MotoGP
Pole position
- Rider: (Australia) Casey Stoner
- Time: 2:11.657
Fastest lap
- Rider: (Australia) Casey Stoner
- Time: 1:57.199
Podium
- First: (Italy) Valentino Rossi
- Second: (Spain) Toni Elías
- Third: (Italy) Loris Capirossi

250cc
Pole position
- Rider: (Italy) Marco Simoncelli
- Time: 2:10.723
Fastest lap
- Rider: (Spain) Alex Debón
- Time: 2:02.354
Podium
- First: (Spain) Alex Debón
- Second: (Spain) Álvaro Bautista
- Third: (Italy) Marco Simoncelli

125cc
Pole position
- Rider: (Hungary) Gábor Talmácsi
- Time: 2:09.870
Fastest lap
- Rider: (France) Mike Di Meglio
- Time: 2:08.391
Podium
- First: (Germany) Stefan Bradl
- Second: (France) Mike Di Meglio
- Third: (Spain) Joan Olivé

The 2008 Czech Republic motorcycle Grand Prix was the twelfth round of the 2008 MotoGP Championship. It took place on the weekend of 8–10 August 2008 at the Brno Circuit located in Brno.

== MotoGP classification ==
| Pos. | No. | Rider | Team | Manufacturer | Laps | Time/Retired | Grid | Points |
|---|---|---|---|---|---|---|---|---|
| 1 | 46 | (Italy) Valentino Rossi | Fiat Yamaha Team | Yamaha | 22 | 43:28.841 | 2 | 25 |
| 2 | 24 | (Spain) Toni Elías | Alice Team | Ducati | 22 | +15.004 | 13 | 20 |
| 3 | 65 | (Italy) Loris Capirossi | Rizla Suzuki MotoGP | Suzuki | 22 | +21.689 | 9 | 16 |
| 4 | 56 | (Japan) Shinya Nakano | San Carlo Honda Gresini | Honda | 22 | +25.859 | 8 | 13 |
| 5 | 13 | (Australia) Anthony West | Kawasaki Racing Team | Kawasaki | 22 | +29.465 | 6 | 11 |
| 6 | 7 | (Australia) Chris Vermeulen | Rizla Suzuki MotoGP | Suzuki | 22 | +30.608 | 4 | 10 |
| 7 | 33 | (Italy) Marco Melandri | Ducati Marlboro Team | Ducati | 22 | +36.453 | 11 | 9 |
| 8 | 15 | (San Marino) Alex de Angelis | San Carlo Honda Gresini | Honda | 22 | +36.750 | 5 | 8 |
| 9 | 4 | (Italy) Andrea Dovizioso | JiR Team Scot MotoGP | Honda | 22 | +38.822 | 14 | 7 |
| 10 | 48 | (Spain) Jorge Lorenzo | Fiat Yamaha Team | Yamaha | 22 | +39.573 | 17 | 6 |
| 11 | 21 | (United States) John Hopkins | Kawasaki Racing Team | Kawasaki | 22 | +39.610 | 3 | 5 |
| 12 | 50 | (France) Sylvain Guintoli | Alice Team | Ducati | 22 | +40.892 | 10 | 4 |
| 13 | 52 | (United Kingdom) James Toseland | Tech 3 Yamaha | Yamaha | 22 | +1:11.490 | 16 | 3 |
| 14 | 5 | (United States) Colin Edwards | Tech 3 Yamaha | Yamaha | 22 | +1:21.133 | 15 | 2 |
| 15 | 2 | (Spain) Dani Pedrosa | Repsol Honda Team | Honda | 22 | +1:37.038 | 12 | 1 |
| 16 | 14 | (France) Randy de Puniet | LCR Honda MotoGP | Honda | 22 | +1:38.407 | 7 | |
| Ret | 1 | (Australia) Casey Stoner | Ducati Marlboro Team | Ducati | 6 | Retirement | 1 | |

== 250 cc classification ==
| Pos. | No. | Rider | Manufacturer | Laps | Time/Retired | Grid | Points |
|---|---|---|---|---|---|---|---|
| 1 | 6 | (Spain) Alex Debón | Aprilia | 20 | 41:08.168 | 2 | 25 |
| 2 | 19 | (Spain) Álvaro Bautista | Aprilia | 20 | +0.280 | 10 | 20 |
| 3 | 58 | (Italy) Marco Simoncelli | Gilera | 20 | +0.325 | 1 | 16 |
| 4 | 21 | (Spain) Héctor Barberá | Aprilia | 20 | +0.827 | 3 | 13 |
| 5 | 36 | (Finland) Mika Kallio | KTM | 20 | +1.249 | 7 | 11 |
| 6 | 72 | (Japan) Yuki Takahashi | Honda | 20 | +13.713 | 8 | 10 |
| 7 | 75 | (Italy) Mattia Pasini | Aprilia | 20 | +13.826 | 4 | 9 |
| 8 | 55 | (Spain) Héctor Faubel | Aprilia | 20 | +16.026 | 14 | 8 |
| 9 | 15 | (Italy) Roberto Locatelli | Gilera | 20 | +19.084 | 17 | 7 |
| 10 | 41 | (Spain) Aleix Espargaró | Aprilia | 20 | +20.692 | 18 | 6 |
| 11 | 14 | (Thailand) Ratthapark Wilairot | Honda | 20 | +29.495 | 20 | 5 |
| 12 | 60 | (Spain) Julián Simón | KTM | 20 | +29.772 | 6 | 4 |
| 13 | 4 | (Japan) Hiroshi Aoyama | KTM | 20 | +31.944 | 16 | 3 |
| 14 | 52 | (Czech Republic) Lukáš Pešek | Aprilia | 20 | +36.314 | 9 | 2 |
| 15 | 25 | (Italy) Alex Baldolini | Aprilia | 20 | +43.751 | 11 | 1 |
| 16 | 50 | (Republic of Ireland) Eugene Laverty | Aprilia | 20 | +46.564 | 12 | |
| 17 | 32 | (Italy) Fabrizio Lai | Gilera | 20 | +55.591 | 13 | |
| 18 | 90 | (Italy) Federico Sandi | Aprilia | 20 | +55.704 | 19 | |
| 19 | 45 | (Indonesia) Doni Tata Pradita | Yamaha | 20 | +1:24.324 | 22 | |
| 20 | 94 | (Germany) Toni Wirsing | Honda | 20 | +1:39.423 | 21 | |
| 21 | 7 | (Spain) Russell Gómez | Aprilia | 20 | +1:59.990 | 23 | |
| Ret | 12 | (Switzerland) Thomas Lüthi | Aprilia | 3 | Accident | 5 | |
| Ret | 17 | (Czech Republic) Karel Abraham | Aprilia | 2 | Accident | 15 | |
| DNS | 54 | (San Marino) Manuel Poggiali | Gilera | 0 | Did not start | 24 | |
OFFICIAL 250cc REPORT

== 125 cc classification ==
| Pos. | No. | Rider | Manufacturer | Laps | Time/Retired | Grid | Points |
|---|---|---|---|---|---|---|---|
| 1 | 17 | (Germany) Stefan Bradl | Aprilia | 19 | 41:05.176 | 13 | 25 |
| 2 | 63 | (France) Mike Di Meglio | Derbi | 19 | +0.881 | 5 | 20 |
| 3 | 6 | (Spain) Joan Olivé | Derbi | 19 | +4.070 | 10 | 16 |
| 4 | 1 | (Hungary) Gábor Talmácsi | Aprilia | 19 | +4.118 | 1 | 13 |
| 5 | 18 | (Spain) Nicolás Terol | Aprilia | 19 | +7.048 | 2 | 11 |
| 6 | 38 | (United Kingdom) Bradley Smith | Aprilia | 19 | +9.334 | 4 | 10 |
| 7 | 11 | (Germany) Sandro Cortese | Aprilia | 19 | +12.813 | 6 | 9 |
| 8 | 44 | (Spain) Pol Espargaró | Derbi | 19 | +16.491 | 7 | 8 |
| 9 | 29 | (Italy) Andrea Iannone | Aprilia | 19 | +17.637 | 3 | 7 |
| 10 | 24 | (Italy) Simone Corsi | Aprilia | 19 | +17.855 | 8 | 6 |
| 11 | 45 | (United Kingdom) Scott Redding | Aprilia | 19 | +18.964 | 17 | 5 |
| 12 | 33 | (Spain) Sergio Gadea | Aprilia | 19 | +29.920 | 9 | 4 |
| 13 | 12 | (Spain) Esteve Rabat | KTM | 19 | +38.445 | 15 | 3 |
| 14 | 77 | (Switzerland) Dominique Aegerter | Derbi | 19 | +54.637 | 24 | 2 |
| 15 | 21 | (Germany) Robin Lässer | Aprilia | 19 | +54.797 | 22 | 1 |
| 16 | 22 | (Spain) Pablo Nieto | KTM | 19 | +55.723 | 28 | |
| 17 | 96 | (Czech Republic) Lukáš Šembera | Aprilia | 19 | +56.786 | 36 | |
| 18 | 7 | (Spain) Efrén Vázquez | Aprilia | 19 | +59.166 | 19 | |
| 19 | 8 | (Italy) Lorenzo Zanetti | KTM | 19 | +59.330 | 20 | |
| 20 | 30 | (Spain) Pere Tutusaus | Aprilia | 19 | +59.340 | 30 | |
| 21 | 60 | (Austria) Michael Ranseder | Aprilia | 19 | +1:00.307 | 25 | |
| 22 | 72 | (Italy) Marco Ravaioli | Aprilia | 19 | +1:07.401 | 33 | |
| 23 | 34 | (Switzerland) Randy Krummenacher | KTM | 19 | +1:11.701 | 26 | |
| 24 | 16 | (France) Jules Cluzel | Loncin | 19 | +1:19.343 | 27 | |
| 25 | 56 | (Netherlands) Hugo van den Berg | Aprilia | 19 | +1:30.988 | 35 | |
| 26 | 5 | (France) Alexis Masbou | Loncin | 19 | +1:31.018 | 32 | |
| 27 | 95 | (Romania) Robert Mureșan | Aprilia | 19 | +1:31.149 | 31 | |
| 28 | 48 | (Switzerland) Bastien Chesaux | Aprilia | 19 | +1:33.222 | 34 | |
| 29 | 69 | (France) Louis Rossi | Honda | 19 | +1:33.600 | 37 | |
| 30 | 97 | (Czech Republic) Michal Prášek | Aprilia | 18 | +1 lap | 38 | |
| 31 | 98 | (Czech Republic) Andrea Toušková | Honda | 18 | +1 lap | 39 | |
| Ret | 37 | (Czech Republic) Karel Pešek | Aprilia | 17 | Accident | 29 | |
| Ret | 51 | (United States) Stevie Bonsey | Aprilia | 15 | Retirement | 18 | |
| Ret | 93 | (Spain) Marc Márquez | KTM | 6 | Accident | 12 | |
| Ret | 94 | (Germany) Jonas Folger | KTM | 1 | Retirement | 23 | |
| Ret | 35 | (Italy) Raffaele De Rosa | KTM | 0 | Accident | 11 | |
| Ret | 71 | (Japan) Tomoyoshi Koyama | KTM | 0 | Accident | 14 | |
| Ret | 73 | (Japan) Takaaki Nakagami | Aprilia | 0 | Accident | 21 | |
| Ret | 99 | (United Kingdom) Danny Webb | Aprilia | 0 | Accident | 16 | |
OFFICIAL 125cc REPORT

== Championship standings after the race (MotoGP) ==
Below are the standings for the top five riders and constructors after round twelve has concluded.

Riders' Championship standings

| Pos. | Rider | Points |
|---|---|---|
| 1 | (Italy) Valentino Rossi | 237 |
| 2 | (Australia) Casey Stoner | 187 |
| 3 | (Spain) Dani Pedrosa | 172 |
| 4 | (Spain) Jorge Lorenzo | 120 |
| 5 | (Italy) Andrea Dovizioso | 110 |

Constructors' Championship standings

| Pos. | Constructor | Points |
|---|---|---|
| 1 | (Japan) Yamaha | 266 |
| 2 | (Italy) Ducati | 212 |
| 3 | (Japan) Honda | 210 |
| 4 | (Japan) Suzuki | 128 |
| 5 | (Japan) Kawasaki | 63 |

- Note: Only the top five positions are included for both sets of standings.

| Previous race: 2008 United States Grand Prix | FIM Grand Prix World Championship; 2008 season | Next race: 2008 San Marino Grand Prix |
| Previous race: 2007 Czech Republic Grand Prix | Czech Republic motorcycle Grand Prix | Next race: 2009 Czech Republic Grand Prix |
