= 2008 Catalan motorcycle Grand Prix =

Coordinates: 41°34′9.9″N 2°15′26.9″E

(Catalonia) 2008 Catalan Grand Prix
Race details
- Race 7 of 18 races in the 2008 Grand Prix motorcycle racing season
- Date: 8 June 2008
- Official name: Gran Premi Cinzano de Catalunya
- Location: Circuit de Catalunya
- Course: Permanent racing facility; 4.727 km (2.937 mi)

MotoGP
Pole position
- Rider: (Australia) Casey Stoner
- Time: 1:41.186
Fastest lap
- Rider: (Spain) Dani Pedrosa
- Time: 1:42.358
Podium
- First: (Spain) Dani Pedrosa
- Second: (Italy) Valentino Rossi
- Third: (Australia) Casey Stoner

250cc
Pole position
- Rider: (Spain) Álvaro Bautista
- Time: 1:45.636
Fastest lap
- Rider: (Spain) Álvaro Bautista
- Time: 1:46.143
Podium
- First: (Italy) Marco Simoncelli
- Second: (Spain) Álvaro Bautista
- Third: (Spain) Héctor Barberá

125cc
Pole position
- Rider: (Spain) Pol Espargaró
- Time: 1:50.557
Fastest lap
- Rider: (Spain) Joan Olivé
- Time: 1:51.271
Podium
- First: (France) Mike Di Meglio
- Second: (Spain) Pol Espargaró
- Third: (Hungary) Gábor Talmácsi

The 2008 Catalan motorcycle Grand Prix was the seventh round of the 2008 MotoGP championship. It took place on the weekend of 6–8 June 2008 at the Circuit de Catalunya.

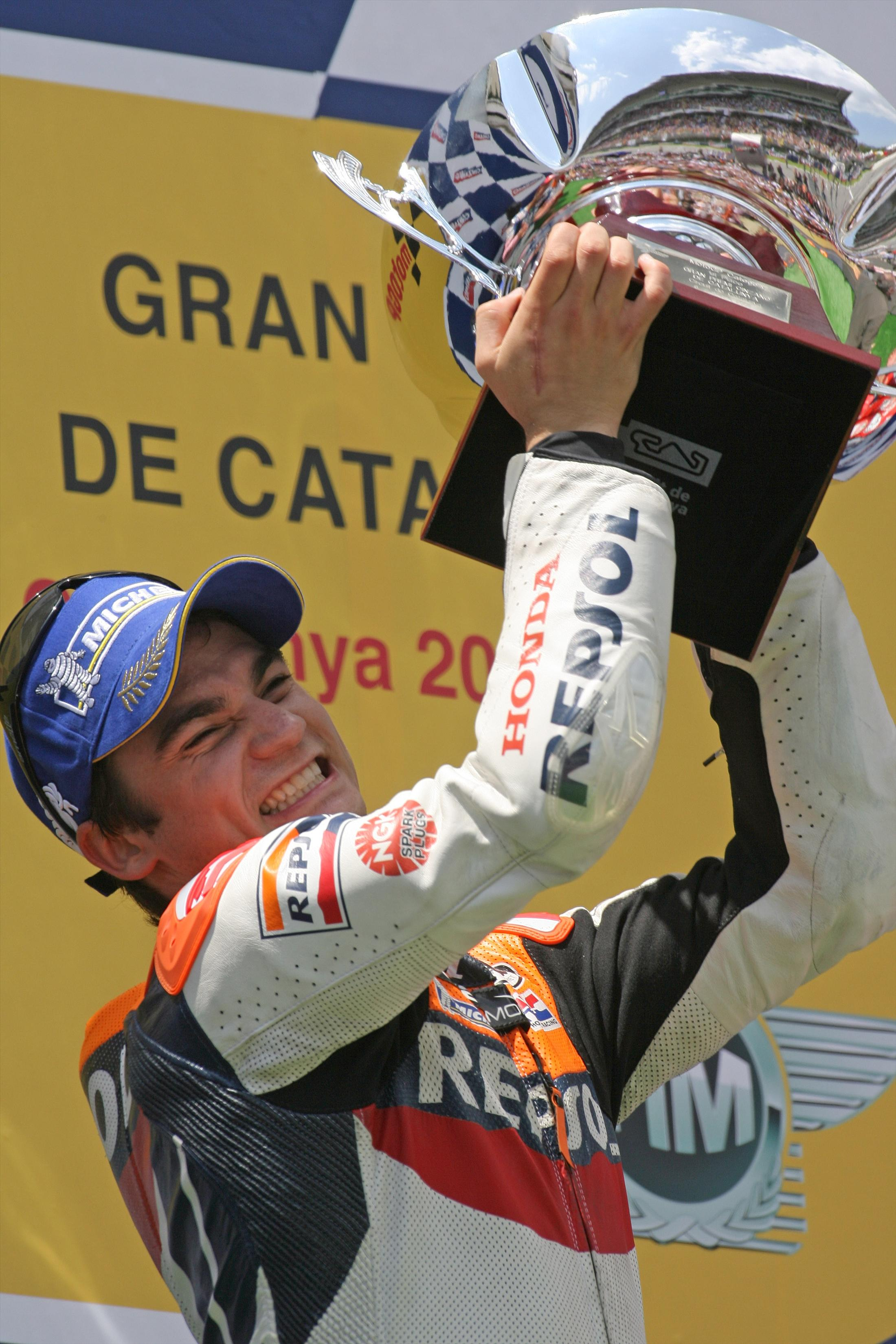
Dani Pedrosa, lifting his trophy on the podium after winning the MotoGP race.

== MotoGP classification ==
Pos.	No.	Rider	Team	Manufacturer	Laps	Time/Retired	Grid	Points
1	2	(Spain) Dani Pedrosa	Repsol Honda Team	Honda	25	43:02.175	2	25
2	46	(Italy) Valentino Rossi	Fiat Yamaha Team	Yamaha	25	+2.806	9	20
3	1	(Australia) Casey Stoner	Ducati Marlboro Team	Ducati	25	+3.343	1	16
4	4	(Italy) Andrea Dovizioso	JiR Team Scot MotoGP	Honda	25	+10.893	7	13
5	5	(United States) Colin Edwards	Tech 3 Yamaha	Yamaha	25	+16.426	5	11
6	52	(United Kingdom) James Toseland	Tech 3 Yamaha	Yamaha	25	+21.482	6	10
7	7	(Australia) Chris Vermeulen	Rizla Suzuki MotoGP	Suzuki	25	+21.548	8	9
8	69	(United States) Nicky Hayden	Repsol Honda Team	Honda	25	+22.280	3	8
9	56	(Japan) Shinya Nakano	San Carlo Honda Gresini	Honda	25	+22.375	11	7
10	21	(United States) John Hopkins	Kawasaki Racing Team	Kawasaki	25	+46.835	14	6
11	33	(Italy) Marco Melandri	Ducati Marlboro Team	Ducati	25	+57.991	16	5
12	13	(Australia) Anthony West	Kawasaki Racing Team	Kawasaki	25	+59.168	17	4
13	50	(France) Sylvain Guintoli	Alice Team	Ducati	25	+1:00.779	15	3
Ret	14	(France) Randy de Puniet	LCR Honda MotoGP	Honda	11	Accident	11	
Ret	15	(San Marino) Alex de Angelis	San Carlo Honda Gresini	Honda	10	Accident	10	
Ret	65	(Italy) Loris Capirossi	Rizla Suzuki MotoGP	Suzuki	10	Accident	12	
DSQ	24	(Spain) Toni Elías	Alice Team	Ducati	8	Black flag	13	
WD	48	(Spain) Jorge Lorenzo	Fiat Yamaha Team	Yamaha		Withdrew		

== 250 cc classification ==
Pos.	No.	Rider	Manufacturer	Laps	Time/Retired	Grid	Points
1	58	(Italy) Marco Simoncelli	Gilera	23	41:01.859	4	25
2	19	(Spain) Álvaro Bautista	Aprilia	23	+0.039	1	20
3	21	(Spain) Héctor Barberá	Aprilia	23	+11.291	3	16
4	6	(Spain) Alex Debón	Aprilia	23	+21.373	2	13
5	12	(Switzerland) Thomas Lüthi	Aprilia	23	+26.621	12	11
6	75	(Italy) Mattia Pasini	Aprilia	23	+26.720	5	10
7	4	(Japan) Hiroshi Aoyama	KTM	23	+35.818	8	9
8	55	(Spain) Héctor Faubel	Aprilia	23	+36.321	6	8
9	60	(Spain) Julián Simón	KTM	23	+36.964	10	7
10	52	(Czech Republic) Lukáš Pešek	Aprilia	23	+41.237	16	6
11	14	(Thailand) Ratthapark Wilairot	Honda	23	+52.391	14	5
12	72	(Japan) Yuki Takahashi	Honda	23	+56.656	7	4
13	25	(Italy) Alex Baldolini	Aprilia	23	+59.282	19	3
14	54	(San Marino) Manuel Poggiali	Gilera	23	+1:02.503	17	2
15	32	(Italy) Fabrizio Lai	Gilera	23	+1:02.656	18	1
16	50	(Republic of Ireland) Eugene Laverty	Aprilia	23	+1:07.418	20	
17	7	(Spain) Russell Gómez	Aprilia	22	+1 lap	21	
18	45	(Indonesia) Doni Tata Pradita	Yamaha	22	+1 lap	24	
Ret	36	(Finland) Mika Kallio	KTM	19	Retirement	9	
Ret	10	(Hungary) Imre Tóth	Aprilia	9	Retirement	22	
Ret	17	(Czech Republic) Karel Abraham	Aprilia	7	Accident	15	
Ret	41	(Spain) Aleix Espargaró	Aprilia	2	Retirement	13	
Ret	92	(Spain) Daniel Arcas	Honda	2	Accident	23	
Ret	15	(Italy) Roberto Locatelli	Gilera	0	Accident	11	
OFFICIAL 250cc REPORT

== 125 cc classification ==
Pos.	No.	Rider	Manufacturer	Laps	Time/Retired	Grid	Points
1	63	(France) Mike Di Meglio	Derbi	22	41:08.708	2	25
2	44	(Spain) Pol Espargaró	Derbi	22	+0.268	1	20
3	1	(Hungary) Gábor Talmácsi	Aprilia	22	+0.338	7	16
4	17	(Germany) Stefan Bradl	Aprilia	22	+8.765	13	13
5	24	(Italy) Simone Corsi	Aprilia	22	+10.141	5	11
6	45	(United Kingdom) Scott Redding	Aprilia	22	+11.178	4	10
7	51	(United States) Stevie Bonsey	Aprilia	22	+13.671	16	9
8	11	(Germany) Sandro Cortese	Aprilia	22	+13.755	11	8
9	33	(Spain) Sergio Gadea	Aprilia	22	+15.541	6	7
10	93	(Spain) Marc Márquez	KTM	22	+18.962	14	6
11	99	(United Kingdom) Danny Webb	Aprilia	22	+22.653	21	5
12	77	(Switzerland) Dominique Aegerter	Derbi	22	+24.928	17	4
13	71	(Japan) Tomoyoshi Koyama	KTM	22	+25.013	22	3
14	38	(United Kingdom) Bradley Smith	Aprilia	22	+25.059	8	2
15	34	(Switzerland) Randy Krummenacher	KTM	22	+25.188	18	1
16	7	(Spain) Efrén Vázquez	Aprilia	22	+25.352	15	
17	60	(Austria) Michael Ranseder	Aprilia	22	+25.541	27	
18	27	(Italy) Stefano Bianco	Aprilia	22	+31.365	26	
19	30	(Spain) Pere Tutusaus	Aprilia	22	+42.899	28	
20	16	(France) Jules Cluzel	Loncin	22	+43.469	29	
21	56	(Netherlands) Hugo van den Berg	Aprilia	22	+56.930	31	
22	73	(Japan) Takaaki Nakagami	Aprilia	22	+1:01.318	19	
23	19	(Italy) Roberto Lacalendola	Aprilia	22	+1:02.867	34	
24	95	(Romania) Robert Mureșan	Aprilia	22	+1:17.370	32	
25	69	(France) Louis Rossi	Honda	22	+1:18.790	35	
26	75	(Spain) Ricard Cardús	Derbi	22	+1:27.350	33	
27	78	(Spain) Daniel Sáez	Aprilia	22	+1:28.736	37	
Ret	14	(Spain) Axel Pons	Aprilia	21	Accident	30	
Ret	18	(Spain) Nicolás Terol	Aprilia	20	Accident	3	
Ret	35	(Italy) Raffaele De Rosa	KTM	20	Retirement	12	
Ret	6	(Spain) Joan Olivé	Derbi	19	Accident	10	
Ret	29	(Italy) Andrea Iannone	Aprilia	17	Accident	9	
Ret	21	(Germany) Robin Lässer	Aprilia	17	Accident	25	
Ret	8	(Italy) Lorenzo Zanetti	KTM	14	Retirement	24	
Ret	5	(France) Alexis Masbou	Loncin	13	Accident	23	
Ret	31	(Spain) Jordi Dalmau	Honda	11	Accident	36	
Ret	76	(Spain) Iván Maestro	Aprilia	10	Accident	38	
Ret	22	(Spain) Pablo Nieto	KTM	1	Retirement	20	
DNS	12	(Spain) Esteve Rabat	KTM		Did not start		
OFFICIAL 125cc REPORT

== Championship standings after the race (MotoGP) ==
Below are the standings for the top five riders and constructors after round seven has concluded.

Riders' Championship standings

Pos.	Rider	Points
1	(Italy) Valentino Rossi	142
2	(Spain) Dani Pedrosa	135
3	(Spain) Jorge Lorenzo	94
4	(Australia) Casey Stoner	92
5	(United States) Colin Edwards	69

Constructors' Championship standings

Pos.	Constructor	Points
1	(Japan) Yamaha	160
2	(Japan) Honda	135
3	(Italy) Ducati	97
4	(Japan) Suzuki	63
5	(Japan) Kawasaki	35

- Note: Only the top five positions are included for both sets of standings.

Previous race: 2008 Italian Grand Prix	FIM Grand Prix World Championship; 2008 season	Next race: 2008 British Grand Prix
Previous race: 2007 Catalan Grand Prix	Catalan motorcycle Grand Prix	Next race: 2009 Catalan Grand Prix
