= 2008 Valencia Superbike World Championship round =

Motorsport race

(Spain) 2008 Spanish Superbike World Championship round
Round details
- Round 3 of 14 rounds in the 2008 Superbike World Championship. and Round 3 of 13 rounds in the 2008 Supersport World Championship.
- Date: April 6, 2008
- Location: Valencia
- Course: Permanent racing facility 4.005 km (2.489 mi)

Superbike World Championship
Pole position
(Germany) Max Neukirchner
1:33.805
Fastest lap race 1	Fastest lap race 2
(Japan) Noriyuki Haga	(Spain) Carlos Checa
1:35.131	1:35.322

Supersport World Championship
Pole position
(Australia) Andrew Pitt
1:36.773
Fastest lap
(Australia) Broc Parkes
1:37.590

The 2008 Valencia Superbike World Championship round was the third round of the 2008 Superbike World Championship. It took take place on the weekend of April 4–6, 2008, at the Circuit Ricardo Tormo in Valencia, Spain.

== Superbike race 1 classification ==
Pos.	No.	Rider	Bike	Laps	Time/Retired	Grid	Points
1	57	(Italy) Lorenzo Lanzi	Ducati 1098 RS 08	23	37:01.894	5	25
2	21	(Australia) Troy Bayliss	Ducati 1098 F08	23	+2.987	3	20
3	11	(Australia) Troy Corser	Yamaha YZF-R1	23	+7.287	8	16
4	10	(Spain) Fonsi Nieto	Suzuki GSX-R1000	23	+11.992	13	13
5	7	(Spain) Carlos Checa	Honda CBR1000RR	23	+12.824	7	11
6	31	(Australia) Karl Muggeridge	Honda CBR1000RR	23	+13.125	19	10
7	36	(Spain) Gregorio Lavilla	Honda CBR1000RR	23	+13.191	17	9
8	55	(France) Régis Laconi	Kawasaki ZX-10R	23	+13.906	15	8
9	100	(Japan) Makoto Tamada	Kawasaki ZX-10R	23	+17.254	12	7
10	44	(Italy) Roberto Rolfo	Honda CBR1000RR	23	+18.606	18	6
11	38	(Japan) Shinichi Nakatomi	Yamaha YZF-R1	23	+19.858	21	5
12	54	(Turkey) Kenan Sofuoğlu	Honda CBR1000RR	23	+23.350	24	4
13	83	(Australia) Russell Holland	Honda CBR1000RR	23	+23.577	20	3
14	96	(Czech Republic) Jakub Smrž	Ducati 1098 RS 08	23	+24.082	16	2
15	94	(Spain) David Checa	Yamaha YZF-R1	23	+26.611	14	1
16	3	(Italy) Max Biaggi	Ducati 1098 RS 08	23	+41.168	9	
17	86	(Italy) Ayrton Badovini	Kawasaki ZX-10R	23	+44.405	27	
18	22	(Italy) Luca Morelli	Honda CBR1000RR	23	+57.045	29	
19	37	(Spain) Diego Lozano Ortiz	Honda CBR1000RR	23	+1:05.173	26	
20	77	(France) Loïc Napoleone	Yamaha YZF-R1	18	+5 laps	30	
Ret	76	(Germany) Max Neukirchner	Suzuki GSX-R1000	22	Accident	1	
Ret	111	(Spain) Rubén Xaus	Ducati 1098 RS 08	10	Retirement	4	
Ret	23	(Japan) Ryuichi Kiyonari	Honda CBR1000RR	9	Retirement	6	
Ret	84	(Italy) Michel Fabrizio	Ducati 1098 F08	4	Accident	11	
Ret	41	(Japan) Noriyuki Haga	Yamaha YZF-R1	3	Accident	10	
Ret	34	(Japan) Yukio Kagayama	Suzuki GSX-R1000	3	Accident	2	
Ret	131	(Spain) Carmelo Morales	Yamaha YZF-R1	3	Accident	25	
Ret	194	(France) Sébastien Gimbert	Yamaha YZF-R1	1	Accident	22	
Ret	16	(Spain) Sergio Fuertes	Suzuki GSX-R1000	1	Accident	23	
Ret	88	(Japan) Shuhei Aoyama	Honda CBR1000RR	1	Accident	28	

== Superbike race 2 classification ==
Pos.	No.	Rider	Bike	Laps	Time/Retired	Grid	Points
1	41	(Japan) Noriyuki Haga	Yamaha YZF-R1	23	37:03.759	9	25
2	21	(Australia) Troy Bayliss	Ducati 1098 F08	23	+1.551	2	20
3	7	(Spain) Carlos Checa	Honda CBR1000RR	23	+2.903	6	16
4	23	(Japan) Ryuichi Kiyonari	Honda CBR1000RR	23	+7.277	5	13
5	11	(Australia) Troy Corser	Yamaha YZF-R1	23	+8.051	7	11
6	34	(Japan) Yukio Kagayama	Suzuki GSX-R1000	23	+9.223	1	10
7	111	(Spain) Rubén Xaus	Ducati 1098 RS 08	23	+10.164	3	9
8	3	(Italy) Max Biaggi	Ducati 1098 RS 08	23	+10.614	8	8
9	55	(France) Régis Laconi	Kawasaki ZX-10R	23	+17.234	14	7
10	10	(Spain) Fonsi Nieto	Suzuki GSX-R1000	23	+18.100	12	6
11	36	(Spain) Gregorio Lavilla	Honda CBR1000RR	23	+18.288	16	5
12	57	(Italy) Lorenzo Lanzi	Ducati 1098 RS 08	23	+18.826	4	4
13	84	(Italy) Michel Fabrizio	Ducati 1098 F08	23	+21.770	10	3
14	96	(Czech Republic) Jakub Smrž	Ducati 1098 RS 08	23	+22.872	15	2
15	54	(Turkey) Kenan Sofuoğlu	Honda CBR1000RR	23	+25.224	21	1
16	38	(Japan) Shinichi Nakatomi	Yamaha YZF-R1	23	+25.301	20	
17	44	(Italy) Roberto Rolfo	Honda CBR1000RR	23	+25.509	17	
18	94	(Spain) David Checa	Yamaha YZF-R1	23	+25.615	13	
19	83	(Australia) Russell Holland	Honda CBR1000RR	23	+26.503	19	
20	31	(Australia) Karl Muggeridge	Honda CBR1000RR	23	+35.171	18	
21	86	(Italy) Ayrton Badovini	Kawasaki ZX-10R	23	+53.624	24	
22	37	(Spain) Diego Lozano Ortiz	Honda CBR1000RR	23	+54.672	23	
23	22	(Italy) Luca Morelli	Honda CBR1000RR	23	+1:00.537	26	
24	88	(Japan) Shuhei Aoyama	Honda CBR1000RR	23	+1:24.952	25	
25	131	(Spain) Carmelo Morales	Yamaha YZF-R1	22	+1 lap	22	
Ret	100	(Japan) Makoto Tamada	Kawasaki ZX-10R	7	Accident	11	
Ret	77	(France) Loïc Napoleone	Yamaha YZF-R1	6	Retirement	27	
DNS	76	(Germany) Max Neukirchner	Suzuki GSX-R1000		Did not start		
DNS	194	(France) Sébastien Gimbert	Yamaha YZF-R1		Did not start		
DNS	16	(Spain) Sergio Fuertes	Suzuki GSX-R1000		Did not start		

== Supersport race classification ==
Pos.	No.	Rider	Bike	Laps	Time/Retired	Grid	Points
1	26	(Spain) Joan Lascorz	Honda CBR600RR	23	37:58.607	2	25
2	99	(France) Fabien Foret	Yamaha YZF-R6	23	+1.125	9	20
3	18	(United Kingdom) Craig Jones	Honda CBR600RR	23	+1.530	3	16
4	23	(Australia) Broc Parkes	Yamaha YZF-R6	23	+10.514	4	13
5	69	(Italy) Gianluca Nannelli	Honda CBR600RR	23	+17.492	17	11
6	65	(United Kingdom) Jonathan Rea	Honda CBR600RR	23	+17.602	6	10
7	55	(Italy) Massimo Roccoli	Yamaha YZF-R6	23	+19.636	7	9
8	147	(Spain) Ángel Rodríguez	Yamaha YZF-R6	23	+19.694	23	8
9	9	(United Kingdom) Chris Walker	Kawasaki ZX-6R	23	+25.230	14	7
10	8	(Australia) Mark Aitchison	Triumph 675	23	+25.702	21	6
11	21	(Japan) Katsuaki Fujiwara	Kawasaki ZX-6R	23	+32.370	5	5
12	105	(Italy) Gianluca Vizziello	Honda CBR600RR	23	+33.591	15	4
13	14	(France) Matthieu Lagrive	Honda CBR600RR	23	+34.706	11	3
14	31	(Finland) Vesa Kallio	Honda CBR600RR	23	+39.956	24	2
15	17	(Portugal) Miguel Praia	Honda CBR600RR	23	+40.227	25	1
16	44	(Spain) David Salom	Yamaha YZF-R6	23	+40.357	16	
17	37	(San Marino) William De Angelis	Honda CBR600RR	23	+41.411	26	
18	121	(France) Arnaud Vincent	Kawasaki ZX-6R	23	+53.810	27	
19	88	(Australia) Andrew Pitt	Honda CBR600RR	23	+56.968	1	
20	83	(Belgium) Didier Van Keymeulen	Suzuki GSX-R600	23	+59.575	30	
21	15	(Hungary) Gergő Talmácsi	Honda CBR600RR	23	+1:13.069	29	
22	75	(Slovenia) Luka Nedog	Honda CBR600RR	23	+1:27.385	35	
23	72	(Hungary) Attila Magda	Honda CBR600RR	23	+1:29.031	36	
Ret	51	(Spain) Santiago Barragán	Honda CBR600RR	14	Retirement	34	
Ret	32	(Italy) Mirko Giansanti	Honda CBR600RR	14	Retirement	28	
Ret	77	(Netherlands) Barry Veneman	Suzuki GSX-R600	13	Retirement	13	
Ret	38	(France) Grégory Leblanc	Honda CBR600RR	11	Accident	20	
Ret	82	(Spain) Adrián Bonastre	Honda CBR600RR	11	Retirement	31	
Ret	47	(Italy) Ivan Clementi	Triumph 675	9	Retirement	10	
Ret	81	(United Kingdom) Graeme Gowland	Honda CBR600RR	8	Accident	12	
Ret	127	(Denmark) Robbin Harms	Honda CBR600RR	5	Accident	19	
Ret	25	(Australia) Josh Brookes	Honda CBR600RR	4	Retirement	8	
Ret	24	(Australia) Garry McCoy	Triumph 675	4	Retirement	22	
Ret	57	(Italy) Ilario Dionisi	Triumph 675	1	Accident	18	
Ret	4	(Italy) Lorenzo Alfonsi	Honda CBR600RR	1	Accident	32	
Ret	199	(Italy) Danilo Dell'Omo	Honda CBR600RR	1	Accident	33	
WD	52	(Spain) José David de Gea	Yamaha YZF-R6		Withdrew		

== Superstock 1000 race classification ==
Pos.	No.	Rider	Bike	Laps	Time/Retired	Grid	Points
1	155	(Australia) Brendan Roberts	Ducati 1098R	13	21:17.585	1	25
2	34	(Italy) Davide Giugliano	Suzuki GSX-R1000 K8	13	+3.795	2	20
3	19	(Belgium) Xavier Simeon	Suzuki GSX-R1000 K8	13	+6.865	9	16
4	53	(Italy) Alessandro Polita	Ducati 1098R	13	+7.272	6	13
5	71	(Italy) Claudio Corti	Yamaha YZF-R1	13	+7.680	4	11
6	51	(Italy) Michele Pirro	Yamaha YZF-R1	13	+11.646	3	10
7	21	(France) Maxime Berger	Honda CBR1000RR	13	+13.281	5	9
8	23	(Australia) Chris Seaton	Suzuki GSX-R1000 K8	13	+17.297	13	8
9	77	(United Kingdom) Barry Burrell	Honda CBR1000RR	13	+17.487	17	7
10	119	(Italy) Michele Magnoni	Yamaha YZF-R1	13	+18.254	12	6
11	111	(Italy) Fabrizio Perotti	Suzuki GSX-R1000 K8	13	+19.910	15	5
12	78	(France) Freddy Foray	Suzuki GSX-R1000 K8	13	+24.142	24	4
13	88	(France) Kenny Foray	Yamaha YZF-R1	13	+24.451	18	3
14	20	(France) Sylvain Barrier	Yamaha YZF-R1	13	+24.896	20	2
15	132	(France) Yoann Tiberio	Kawasaki ZX-10R	13	+24.934	11	1
16	16	(Netherlands) Raymond Schouten	Yamaha YZF-R1	13	+25.955	14	
17	15	(Italy) Matteo Baiocco	Kawasaki ZX-10R	13	+27.450	23	
18	14	(Sweden) Filip Backlund	Suzuki GSX-R1000 K8	13	+31.520	22	
19	30	(Switzerland) Michaël Savary	Suzuki GSX-R1000 K8	13	+31.636	29	
20	8	(Italy) Andrea Antonelli	Honda CBR1000RR	13	+32.164	21	
21	5	(Netherlands) Danny De Boer	Suzuki GSX-R1000 K8	13	+36.987	27	
22	18	(United Kingdom) Matt Bond	Suzuki GSX-R1000 K8	13	+41.607	31	
23	996	(Italy) Jonathan Gallina	Kawasaki ZX-10R	13	+41.667	33	
24	33	(Estonia) Marko Rohtlaan	Honda CBR1000RR	13	+42.871	28	
25	24	(Slovenia) Marko Jerman	Honda CBR1000RR	13	+45.216	32	
26	117	(Italy) Denis Sacchetti	Ducati 1098R	13	+51.360	35	
27	99	(Netherlands) Roy Ten Napel	Suzuki GSX-R1000 K8	13	+51.519	26	
28	29	(Italy) Davide Bastianelli	Suzuki GSX-R1000 K8	13	+52.617	30	
29	41	(Switzerland) Gregory Junod	Yamaha YZF-R1	13	+52.771	34	
30	90	(Czech Republic) Michal Drobný	Honda CBR1000RR	13	+54.632	36	
31	87	(Australia) Gareth Jones	Suzuki GSX-R1000 K8	13	+55.682	25	
32	57	(Australia) Cameron Stronach	Kawasaki ZX-10R	13	+1:09.131	37	
33	58	(Italy) Robert Gianfardoni	Ducati 1098R	13	+1:16.455	39	
Ret	72	(Spain) Jordi Torres	Honda CBR1000RR	7	Accident	7	
Ret	96	(Czech Republic) Matěj Smrž	Honda CBR1000RR	6	Retirement	19	
Ret	92	(Slovenia) Jure Stibilj	Honda CBR1000RR	5	Retirement	38	
Ret	66	(Netherlands) Branko Srdanov	Yamaha YZF-R1	4	Retirement	40	
Ret	7	(Austria) René Mähr	KTM 1190 RC8	2	Accident	10	
Ret	89	(Italy) Domenico Colucci	Ducati 1098R	0	Accident	8	
Ret	12	(Italy) Alessio Aldrovandi	Kawasaki ZX-10R	0	Accident	16	

== Superstock 600 race classification ==
Pos.	No.	Rider	Bike	Laps	Time/Retired	Grid	Points
1	65	(France) Loris Baz	Yamaha YZF-R6	9	15:22.756	3	25
2	119	(Italy) Danilo Petrucci	Yamaha YZF-R6	9	+1.166	1	20
3	45	(United Kingdom) Dan Linfoot	Yamaha YZF-R6	9	+1.435	7	16
4	24	(Italy) Daniele Beretta	Suzuki GSX-R600	9	+2.310	4	13
5	3	(Italy) Giuliano Gregorini	Honda CBR600RR	9	+3.631	11	11
6	42	(Italy) Leonardo Biliotti	Honda CBR600RR	9	+4.277	9	10
7	91	(Sweden) Hampus Johansson	Yamaha YZF-R6	9	+5.246	10	9
8	47	(Italy) Eddi La Marra	Suzuki GSX-R600	9	+6.343	16	8
9	44	(United Kingdom) Gino Rea	Yamaha YZF-R6	9	+7.669	6	7
10	7	(Italy) Renato Costantini	Yamaha YZF-R6	9	+10.697	13	6
11	77	(Czech Republic) Patrik Vostárek	Honda CBR600RR	9	+11.873	29	5
12	55	(Belgium) Vincent Lonbois	Suzuki GSX-R600	9	+12.874	22	4
13	10	(Spain) Nacho Calero	Yamaha YZF-R6	9	+13.563	23	3
14	111	(Czech Republic) Michal Šembera	Honda CBR600RR	9	+13.684	18	2
15	70	(United Kingdom) Thomas Grant	Triumph 675	9	+13.841	14	1
16	18	(France) Nicolas Pouhair	Yamaha YZF-R6	9	+14.096	15	
17	69	(Czech Republic) Ondřej Ježek	Kawasaki ZX-6R	9	+16.560	21	
18	93	(France) Mathieu Lussiana	Yamaha YZF-R6	9	+19.309	25	
19	6	(Italy) Andrea Boscoscuro	Kawasaki ZX-6R	9	+19.623	26	
20	56	(United Kingdom) David Paton	Honda CBR600RR	9	+20.021	19	
21	88	(Spain) Yannick Guerra	Yamaha YZF-R6	9	+21.135	30	
22	72	(Norway) Fredrik Karlsen	Yamaha YZF-R6	9	+21.363	27	
23	17	(United Kingdom) Robbie Stewart	Triumph 675	9	+22.135	20	
24	96	(United Kingdom) Daniel Brill	Honda CBR600RR	9	+25.288	24	
25	21	(United Kingdom) Alex Lowes	Kawasaki ZX-6R	9	+27.150	28	
26	39	(Germany) Steven Michels	Suzuki GSX-R600	9	+32.355	32	
27	12	(United Kingdom) Sam Lowes	Honda CBR600RR	9	+34.772	12	
28	57	(Denmark) Kenny Tirsgaard	Suzuki GSX-R600	9	+35.217	31	
29	23	(Switzerland) Christian Von Gunten	Suzuki GSX-R600	9	+35.809	33	
30	14	(Belgium) Nicolas Pirot	Yamaha YZF-R6	9	+1:08.220	35	
DSQ	27	(Spain) Daniel Arcas	Honda CBR600RR	9	(+0.738)	8	
Ret	99	(United Kingdom) Gregg Black	Yamaha YZF-R6	4	Retirement	5	
Ret	35	(Italy) Simone Grotzkyj	Honda CBR600RR	4	Accident	34	
Ret	11	(France) Jérémy Guarnoni	Yamaha YZF-R6	1	Accident	17	
Ret	5	(Italy) Marco Bussolotti	Yamaha YZF-R6	0	Accident	2	
