= Joey Litjens =

Dutch motorcycle racer

Joey Litjens (born 8 February 1990, in Venray) is a motorcyclist from America, Netherlands.

== Career ==
Litjens' "career" started when he was three years of age and drove his Yamaha PW50 around his parents' house in America. His fascination with everything concerning motorcycles was the basis for his later driving of minibikes.

When he was nine years old, Litjens was given special permission to drive in the "heaviest" class in this sport. He entered in the 2000 season and ended up finishing second. With a championship in the Junior B class, he finished his career in the minibikes. Before that, he drove in the European championships minibike in Italy, finishing 17th in a strong field and 6th in the Czech Republic.

In 2009, Litjens' career ended abruptly. After a heavy crash on the Hengelo circuit he tore four nerves in his right arm causing paralysis of this arm. Although he was unable to ride a motorbike, he stated in several interviews he would like to stay part of the motorsport world, for instance in training young talents.

On Friday 19 May 2012, Litjens rode a Yamaha YZF 125R on the kart circuit Soka Fran on the inside ring of Spa Francorchamps; the first ride since his accident.

== Achievements ==
- - 2000 - Start minibike racing.
- - 2001 - Dutch champion Minibike racing (11 years old).
- - 2002 - Dutch champion in Aprilia 125 Cup: 9 victories in 10 races.
- - 2003 - 5th in Dutch championship 125cc on Honda (Rookie of the Year).
- - 2004 - 12th in Dutch championship 125cc on Honda.
- - 2004 - 9th in German championship (125cc Honda). German season, 8 races.
- - 2004 - 11th in European championship on 125cc Honda (8 races).
- - 2005 - 4th in European championship 125cc on HONDA .
- - 2005 - 6th in Dutch championship 125cc on Honda, win at Assen (drove 3 of 8 ONK-races).
- - 2005 - Netherlands – Racing Team of the year (Stichting Litjens Racing).
- - 2005 - 16th in German championship (1 race) 125cc on Honda.
- - 2005 - GP-debut - TT Assen/NETH - 125cc Honda - 30th (no GP starts: 1).
- - 2005 - November, testraces for Molenaar-Honda team in Valencia and Jerez.
- - 2006 - Grand Prix 125cc in the Molenaar Racing Team.
- - 2007 - Grand Prix 125cc in the Molenaar/DeGraaf Racing Team.

== Career statistics ==
2008 - 35th, European Superstock 600 Championship, Yamaha YZF-R6
2009 - 13th, European Superstock 600 Championship, Yamaha YZF-R6

=== Grand Prix motorcycle results ===
==== By season ====
Season	Class	Motorcycle	Team	Number	Race	Win	Podium	Pole	FLap	Pts	Plcd
2005	125cc	Honda	Litjens Racing	37	1	0	0	0	0	0	NC
2006	125cc	Honda	Arie Molenaar Racing	37	15	0	0	0	0	0	NC
2007	125cc	Honda	De Graaf Grand Prix	37	15	0	0	0	0	0	NC
2008	125cc	Seel	Abbink Bos Racing	80	1	0	0	0	0	0	NC
Total					**32**	**0**	**0**	**0**	**0**	**0**	

==== Races by year ====
Year	Class	Bike	1	2	3	4	5	6	7	8	9	10	11	12	13	14	15	16	17	Pos	Points
2005	125cc	Honda	SPA	POR	CHN	FRA	ITA	CAT	NED; 30	GBR	GER	CZE	JPN	MAL	QAT	AUS	TUR	VAL		NC	0
2006	125cc	Honda	SPA; 33	QAT; 27	TUR; 34	CHN; 27	FRA; 24	ITA; Ret	CAT; 29	NED; 19	GBR	GER; Ret	CZE; 25	MAL; Ret	AUS; Ret	JPN; 29	POR; 25	VAL; 25		NC	0
2007	125cc	Honda	QAT; 21	SPA; 21	TUR; 20	CHN; 22	FRA; 25	ITA; 16	CAT; Ret	GBR; 21	NED; 26	GER; Ret	CZE; 24	RSM; 27	POR	JPN	AUS; 17	MAL; 24	VAL; 24	NC	0
2008	125cc	Seel	QAT	SPA	POR	CHN	FRA	ITA	CAT	GBR	NED; Ret	GER	CZE	RSM	INP	JPN	AUS	MAL	VAL	NC	0

=== European Superstock 600 ===
==== Races by year ====
(key) (Races in bold indicate pole position, races in italics indicate fastest lap)

Year	Bike	1	2	3	4	5	6	7	8	9	10	Pos	Pts
2008	Yamaha	VAL	ASS	MNZ	NÜR	MIS	BRN	BRA	DON	MAG	POR; 12	35th	4
2009	Yamaha	VAL; 6	ASS; 2	MNZ; 8	MIS	SIL	BRN	NÜR	IMO	MAG	POR	13rd	38
