= 2009 European Superstock 600 Championship =

Motorcycle racing series

2009 European Superstock 600 Championship
| Previous: | 2008 | Next: | 2010 |
Support series: Superbike World Championship; Supersport World Championship; FIM Superstock 1000 Cup

The 2009 European Superstock 600 Championship was the fifth season of the European Superstock 600 Championship. The season was contested over tenth races, beginning at Circuit Ricardo Tormo on 5 April and ending at Algarve International Circuit on 25 October. Gino Rea clinched the title after beating closest rival Marco Bussolotti.

== Race calendar and results ==
2009 Calendar
| Round | Country | Circuit | Date | Pole position | Fastest lap | Winning rider | Winning team |
|---|---|---|---|---|---|---|---|
| 1 | Spain | Circuit Ricardo Tormo | 5 April | (Italy) Danilo Petrucci | (Belgium) Vincent Lonbois | (Italy) Danilo Petrucci | Yamaha Italia Jr Trasimeno |
| 2 | Netherlands | TT Circuit Assen | 26 April | (Italy) Danilo Petrucci | (Italy) Marco Bussolotti | (United Kingdom) Gino Rea | Ten Kate Honda Racing |
| 3 | Italy | Autodromo Nazionale Monza | 10 May | (Italy) Ferruccio Lamborghini | (Italy) Danilo Petrucci | (Italy) Danilo Petrucci | Yamaha Italia Jr Trasimeno |
| 4 | San Marino | Misano Circuit | 21 June | (Italy) Ferruccio Lamborghini | (Italy) Ferruccio Lamborghini | (Italy) Danilo Petrucci | Yamaha Italia Jr Trasimeno |
| 5 | (United Kingdom) Great Britain | Donington Park | 28 June | (Italy) Danilo Petrucci | (Belgium) Vincent Lonbois | (Italy) Marco Bussolotti | Yamaha Italia Jr Trasimeno |
| 6 | Czech Republic | Brno Circuit | 26 July | (Belgium) Vincent Lonbois | (Norway) Fredrik Karlsen | (Belgium) Vincent Lonbois | MTM Racing Team |
| 7 | Germany | Nürburgring | 06 September | (Belgium) Vincent Lonbois | (Belgium) Vincent Lonbois | (Belgium) Vincent Lonbois | MTM Racing Team |
| 8 | Italy | Autodromo Enzo e Dino Ferrari | 27 September | (Italy) Danilo Petrucci | (Italy) Roberto Tamburini | (Italy) Eddi La Marra | Team Lorini |
| 9 | France | Circuit de Nevers Magny-Cours | 4 October | (Italy) Marco Bussolotti | (France) Baptiste Guittet | (France) Florian Marino | Race Junior |
| 10 | Portugal | Algarve International Circuit | 25 October | (Italy) Eddi La Marra | (Italy) Marco Bussolotti | (Italy) Marco Bussolotti | Yamaha Italia Jr Trasimeno |

== Entry list ==
| Team | Constructor | Motorcycle | No. | Rider | Rounds |
|---|---|---|---|---|---|
| Azione Corse | Honda | Honda CBR600RR | 12 | (Italy) Riccardo Cecchini | All |
| Coutelle Junior Team | Honda | Honda CBR600RR | 6 | (France) Jonathan Martinez | 6, 10 |
| Coutelle Junior Team | Honda | Honda CBR600RR | 7 | (France) Baptiste Guittet | All |
| Intermoto Czech | Honda | Honda CBR600RR | 39 | (France) Randy Pagaud | 8–10 |
| Intermoto Czech | Honda | Honda CBR600RR | 65 | (Slovakia) Tomáš Svitok | 6 |
| Intermoto Czech | Honda | Honda CBR600RR | 81 | (Czech Republic) David Látr | All |
| Intermoto Czech | Honda | Honda CBR600RR | 82 | (Czech Republic) Karel Pešek | 10 |
| Orelac Racing | Honda | Honda CBR600RR | 15 | (Spain) Ivan Romero | 10 |
| Race Junior | Honda | Honda CBR600RR | 21 | (France) Florian Marino | 8–10 |
| Race Junior | Honda | Honda CBR600RR | 132 | (Italy) Daniele Manfrinati | 1–6 |
| Team Gomme e Service | Honda | Honda CBR600RR | 22 | (Italy) Raffaele Vargas | 8 |
| Team Horse | Honda | Honda CBR600RR | 142 | (France) Nans Chevaux | 9 |
| Team Lorini | Honda | Honda CBR600RR | 19 | (Italy) Nico Morelli | All |
| Team Lorini | Honda | Honda CBR600RR | 47 | (Italy) Eddi La Marra | All |
| Ten Kate Honda Racing | Honda | Honda CBR600RR | 4 | (United Kingdom) Gino Rea | All |
| Gearlink Kawasaki | Kawasaki | Kawasaki ZX-6R | 130 | (Republic of Ireland) Jamie Hamilton | 5 |
| Pro Action | Kawasaki | Kawasaki ZX-6R | 10 | (Spain) Nacho Calero | 1 |
| Pro Action | Kawasaki | Kawasaki ZX-6R | 13 | (Italy) Dino Lombardi | 1–3 |
| Racing Team Ragno | Kawasaki | Kawasaki ZX-6R | 31 | (Italy) Marco Ferroni | 8 |
| Rui Batista Competicioes | Kawasaki | Kawasaki ZX-6R | 41 | (Portugal) Sergio Batista | 10 |
| Team Powerbike | Kawasaki | Kawasaki ZX-6R | 43 | (France) Stéphane Egea | 9 |
| TMR Competicion | Kawasaki | Kawasaki ZX-6R | 14 | (Spain) Jaume Ferrer | 10 |
| Bertico Racing Team | Suzuki | Suzuki GSX-R600 | 119 | (Netherlands) Jardo Van Huisstede | 2 |
| TKR Suzuki Switzerland | Suzuki | Suzuki GSX-R600 | 23 | (Switzerland) Christian Von Gunten | 1–4, 6–10 |
| G–LAB Racing Sport Evolution | Triumph | Triumph Daytona 675 | 32 | (Germany) Marc Moser | 7, 10 |
| Baru Racing Team | Yamaha | Yamaha YZF-R6 | 133 | (Italy) Giuliano Gregorini | 3–4, 8 |
| BWIN Yoshimura Racing | Yamaha | Yamaha YZF-R6 | 89 | (Austria) Stefan Kerschbaumer | All |
| CHRI 44 Racing Team | Yamaha | Yamaha YZF-R6 | 44 | (Italy) Davide Fanelli | 4 |
| Edwin Ott Motoren | Yamaha | Yamaha YZF-R6 | 91 | (Netherlands) Alex Ott | 2 |
| IamaLoures Cetelem Yamaha | Yamaha | Yamaha YZF-R6 | 117 | (Portugal) André Carvalho | 10 |
| M2 Racing | Yamaha | Yamaha YZF-R6 | 84 | (Italy) Fabio Massei | 3 |
| Morillas; MRS Racing | Yamaha | Yamaha YZF-R6 | 11 | (France) Jérémy Guarnoni | All |
| MS Racing CZ; MS Racing | Yamaha | Yamaha YZF-R6 | 99 | (Czech Republic) Michal Salač | 6–10 |
| MS Racing CZ; MS Racing | Yamaha | Yamaha YZF-R6 | 191 | (Slovakia) Tomáš Krajči | 6 |
| MTM Racing Team | Yamaha | Yamaha YZF-R6 | 55 | (Belgium) Vincent Lonbois | All |
| Pro Action | Yamaha | Yamaha YZF-R6 | 10 | (Spain) Nacho Calero | 2–7, 10 |
| Pro Action | Yamaha | Yamaha YZF-R6 | 13 | (Italy) Dino Lombardi | 4, 6 |
| Red Bulle Racing Team | Yamaha | Yamaha YZF-R6 | 27 | (France) Louis Bulle | 9 |
| Schacht Racing | Yamaha | Yamaha YZF-R6 | 59 | (Denmark) Alex Schacht | 9 |
| Splitlath Motorsport | Yamaha | Yamaha YZF-R6 | 53 | (United Kingdom) Joe Burns | 5 |
| START Racing | Yamaha | Yamaha YZF-R6 | 34 | (Netherlands) Kevin Van Leuven | 2 |
| Team ASPI-CSM Bucharest | Yamaha | Yamaha YZF-R6 | 26 | (Romania) Mircea Vrăjitoru | All |
| Team ASPI-CSM Bucharest | Yamaha | Yamaha YZF-R6 | 30 | (Romania) Bogdan Vrăjitoru | All |
| Team Media Action by Pro Race | Yamaha | Yamaha YZF-R6 | 28 | (Italy) Ferruccio Lamborghini | 3–4, 8 |
| Team Media Action by Pro Race | Yamaha | Yamaha YZF-R6 | 35 | (Italy) Nicola Jr. Morrentino | 8 |
| Team Nelson Evolution | Yamaha | Yamaha YZF-R6 | 69 | (France) Nelson Major | 9 |
| Team RCGM Moto 2000 | Yamaha | Yamaha YZF-R6 | 25 | (Italy) Roberto Farinelli | 4, 8 |
| Team Riviera | Yamaha | Yamaha YZF-R6 | 73 | (Italy) Andrea Boscoscuro | 4 |
| Team Trasimeno | Yamaha | Yamaha YZF-R6 | 36 | (Poland) Andrzej Chmielewski | All |
| VD Heyden Motors Yamaha | Yamaha | Yamaha YZF-R6 | 37 | (Netherlands) Joey Litjens | 1–3 |
| VD Heyden Motors Yamaha | Yamaha | Yamaha YZF-R6 | 72 | (Norway) Fredrik Karlsen | 4–10 |
| WCR Bike Service | Yamaha | Yamaha YZF-R6 | 40 | (Italy) Roberto Tamburini | 4, 8 |
| Yamaha Italia Jr Trasimeno | Yamaha | Yamaha YZF-R6 | 5 | (Italy) Marco Bussolotti | All |
| Yamaha Italia Jr Trasimeno | Yamaha | Yamaha YZF-R6 | 9 | (Italy) Danilo Petrucci | All |
| YZF Yamaha | Yamaha | Yamaha YZF-R6 | 17 | (Croatia) Luca Nervo | 8–10 |
| YZF Yamaha | Yamaha | Yamaha YZF-R6 | 48 | (South Africa) James Waterman | 6–7 |

Key
Regular rider
Wildcard rider
Replacement rider

- All entries used Pirelli tyres.

== Championship' standings ==
=== Riders' standings ===
| Pos | Rider | Bike | VAL (Spain) | ASS (Netherlands) | MNZ (Italy) | MIS (San Marino) | SIL (United Kingdom) | BRN (Czech Republic) | NÜR (Germany) | IMO (Italy) | MAG (France) | POR (Portugal) | Pts |
|---|---|---|---|---|---|---|---|---|---|---|---|---|---|
| 1 | (United Kingdom) Gino Rea | Honda | 3 | 1 | 7 | 8 | 2 | 6 | 6 | 2 | 2 | 3 | 154 |
| 2 | (Italy) Marco Bussolotti | Yamaha | 4 | Ret | 4 | 2 | 1 | 7 | 3 | 3 | **3** | 1 | 153 |
| 3 | (Belgium) Vincent Lonbois | Yamaha | 2 | Ret | 2 | 3 | 8 | **1** | **1** | 6 | 9 | 2 | 151 |
| 4 | (Italy) Danilo Petrucci | Yamaha | **1** | **Ret** | 1 | 1 | **9** | 2 | 2 | **4** | 18 | 5 | 146 |
| 5 | (Italy) Eddi La Marra | Honda | Ret | 5 | 5 | 4 | 12 | 3 | 4 | 1 | 5 | **Ret** | 104 |
| 6 | (France) Jérémy Guarnoni | Yamaha | 5 | 3 | 3 | 5 | 3 | 4 | Ret | 5 | Ret | 6 | 104 |
| 7 | (France) Baptiste Guittet | Honda | 8 | 7 | 12 | 10 | 4 | 9 | 7 | 14 | 4 | 9 | 78 |
| 8 | (Austria) Stefan Kerschbaumer | Yamaha | 7 | 4 | 13 | 9 | 5 | 8 | 8 | 13 | 8 | 10 | 76 |
| 9 | (Norway) Fredrik Karlsen | Yamaha | | | | Ret | 13 | 5 | 5 | 11 | Ret | 4 | 43 |
| 10 | (Italy) Nico Morelli | Honda | Ret | 10 | 14 | 13 | 6 | Ret | Ret | 12 | 7 | 8 | 42 |
| 11 | (Poland) Andrzej Chmielewski | Yamaha | 9 | 9 | 9 | 18 | 7 | Ret | 11 | 15 | 13 | 13 | 42 |
| 12 | (France) Florian Marino | Honda | | | | | | | | 10 | 1 | 7 | 40 |
| 13 | (Netherlands) Joey Litjens | Yamaha | 6 | 2 | 8 | | | | | | | | 38 |
| 14 | (Italy) Riccardo Cecchini | Honda | 14 | 12 | 10 | 15 | 10 | 18 | 9 | 16 | 20 | 12 | 30 |
| 15 | (Italy) Dino Lombardi | Kawasaki | 10 | 6 | 11 | | | | | | | | 23 |
| 15 | (Italy) Dino Lombardi | Yamaha | | | | 14 | | DNS | | | | | 23 |
| 16 | (Italy) Giuliano Gregorini | Yamaha | | | 6 | Ret | | | | 7 | | | 19 |
| 17 | (Italy) Roberto Tamburini | Yamaha | | | | 7 | | | | 8 | | | 17 |
| 18 | (Spain) Nacho Calero | Kawasaki | 11 | | | | | | | | | | 17 |
| 18 | (Spain) Nacho Calero | Yamaha | | 16 | 15 | 16 | 14 | 13 | 12 | | | 14 | 17 |
| 19 | (Switzerland) Christian Von Gunten | Suzuki | 12 | 13 | Ret | Ret | | 10 | DNS | 18 | 19 | Ret | 13 |
| 20 | (Italy) Andre Boscoscuro | Yamaha | | | | 6 | | | | | | | 10 |
| 21 | (France) Louis Bulle | Yamaha | | | | | | | | | 6 | | 10 |
| 22 | (Netherlands) Kevin Van Leuven | Yamaha | | 8 | | | | | | | | | 8 |
| 23 | (Italy) Ferruccio Lamborghini | Yamaha | | | **DSQ** | **Ret** | | | | 9 | | | 7 |
| 24 | (Germany) Marc Moser | Triumph | | | | | | | 10 | | | 17 | 6 |
| 25 | (France) Randy Pagaud | Honda | | | | | | | | 17 | 10 | 23 | 6 |
| 26 | (Netherlands) Alex Ott | Yamaha | | 11 | | | | | | | | | 5 |
| 27 | (Italy) Davide Fanelli | Yamaha | | | | 11 | | | | | | | 5 |
| 28 | (United Kingdom) Joe Burns | Yamaha | | | | | 11 | | | | | | 5 |
| 29 | (France) Jonathan Martinez | Honda | | | | | | 11 | | | | 18 | 5 |
| 30 | (France) Nelson Major | Yamaha | | | | | | | | | 11 | | 5 |
| 31 | (Portugal) André Carvalho | Yamaha | | | | | | | | | | 11 | 5 |
| 32 | (Italy) Daniele Manfrinati | Honda | 13 | 15 | Ret | 17 | 15 | 19 | | | | | 5 |
| 33 | (Italy) Roberto Farinelli | Yamaha | | | | 12 | | | | Ret | | | 4 |
| 34 | (Slovakia) Tomáš Krajči | Yamaha | | | | | | 12 | | | | | 4 |
| 35 | (France) Nans Chevaux | Honda | | | | | | | | | 12 | | 4 |
| 36 | (Romania) Mircea Vrăjitoru | Yamaha | Ret | 18 | 17 | 19 | 16 | 15 | 13 | 24 | 17 | 19 | 4 |
| 37 | (Netherlands) Jardo Van Huisstede | Suzuki | | 14 | | | | | | | | | 2 |
| 38 | (Slovakia) Tomáš Svitok | Honda | | | | | | 14 | | | | | 2 |
| 39 | (Czech Republic) Michal Salač | Yamaha | | | | | | Ret | 14 | 21 | 16 | 16 | 2 |
| 40 | (Denmark) Alex Schacht | Yamaha | | | | | | | | | 14 | | 2 |
| 41 | (Czech Republic) David Látr | Honda | Ret | 17 | 16 | 20 | 17 | 16 | 15 | 25 | Ret | 22 | 1 |
| 42 | (France) Stéphane Egea | Kawasaki | | | | | | | | | 15 | | 1 |
| 43 | (Portugal) Sergio Batista | Kawasaki | | | | | | | | | | 15 | 1 |
| | (South Africa) James Waterman | Yamaha | | | | | | 17 | DSQ | | | | 0 |
| | (Romania) Bogdan Vrăjitoru | Yamaha | DNQ | 19 | 18 | 21 | 18 | 20 | DNQ | 26 | 21 | 26 | 0 |
| | (Croatia) Luca Nervo | Yamaha | | | | | | | | 19 | Ret | 25 | 0 |
| | (Italy) Nicola Jr. Morrentino | Yamaha | | | | | | | | 20 | | | 0 |
| | (Spain) Jaume Ferrer | Kawasaki | | | | | | | | | | 20 | 0 |
| | (Czech Republic) Karel Pešek | Honda | | | | | | | | | | 21 | 0 |
| | (Italy) Raffaele Vargas | Honda | | | | | | | | 22 | | | 0 |
| | (Italy) Marco Ferroni | Kawasaki | | | | | | | | 23 | | | 0 |
| | (Spain) Ivan Romero | Honda | | | | | | | | | | 24 | 0 |
| | (Republic of Ireland) Jamie Hamilton | Kawasaki | | | | | Ret | | | | | | 0 |
| | (Italy) Fabio Massei | Yamaha | | | DSQ | | | | | | | | 0 |
| Pos | Rider | Bike | POR (Portugal) | VAL (Spain) | ASS (Netherlands) | MNZ (Italy) | MIS (San Marino) | BRN (Czech Republic) | SIL (United Kingdom) | NÜR (Germany) | IMO (Italy) | MAG (France) | Pts |

| Colour | Result |
|---|---|
| Gold | Winner |
| Silver | Second place |
| Bronze | Third place |
| Green | Points classification |
| Blue | Non-points classification |
| Blue | Non-classified finish (NC) |
| Purple | Retired, not classified (Ret) |
| Red | Did not qualify (DNQ) |
| Red | Did not pre-qualify (DNPQ) |
| Black | Disqualified (DSQ) |
| White | Did not start (DNS) |
| White | Withdrew (WD) |
| White | Race cancelled (C) |
| Blank | Did not practice (DNP) |
| Blank | Did not arrive (DNA) |
| Blank | Excluded (EX) |

**Bold** – Pole position
Italics – Fastest lap
Source :
