= Robbie Stewart =

British motorcycle racer

- Born: 27 November 1991 (age 34); Perth, Scotland

Robbie Stewart is a British Grand Prix motorcycle racer.

== Career statistics ==
2008 - NC, European Superstock 600 Championship, Triumph 675

=== Grand Prix motorcycle racing ===
==== By season ====
Season	Class	Motorcycle	Team	Number	Race	Win	Podium	Pole	FLap	Pts	Plcd
2007	125cc	Honda	KRP	84	1	0	0	0	0	0	NC
Total					**1**	**0**	**0**	**0**	**0**	**0**	

==== Races by year ====
Year	Class	Bike	1	2	3	4	5	6	7	8	9	10	11	12	13	14	15	16	17	Pos	Points
2007	125cc	Honda	QAT	SPA	TUR	CHN	FRA	ITA	CAT	GBR; 28	NED	GER	CZE	RSM	POR	JPN	AUS	MAL	VAL	NC	0

=== European Superstock 600 ===
==== Races by year ====
(key) (Races in bold indicate pole position, races in italics indicate fastest lap)

Year	Bike	1	2	3	4	5	6	7	8	9	10	Pos	Pts
2008	Triumph	VAL; 23	ASS; 17	MNZ; Ret	NÜR	MIS; 23	BRN; 25	BRA; 23	DON; 16	MAG	POR	NC	0

=== British 125cc Championship ===
(key) (Races in bold indicate pole position, races in italics indicate fastest lap)

Year	Bike	1	2	3	4	5	6	7	8	9	10	11	12	Pos	Pts
2009	Honda	BHI; Ret	OUL; 12	DON; Ret	THR; 14	SNE; Ret	KNO; 4	MAL; 4	BHGP; 6	CAD; Ret	CRO; Ret	SIL	OUL	**13th**	**42**

=== British Supersport Championship ===
==== Races by year ====
(key) (Races in bold indicate pole position, races in italics indicate fastest lap)

Year	Bike	1		2		3		4		5		6		7		8		9		10		11		12		Pos	Pts
Year	Bike	R1	R2	R1	R2	R1	R2	R1	R2	R1	R2	R1	R2	R1	R2	R1	R2	R1	R2	R1	R2	R1	R2	R1	R2	Pos	Pts
2012	Kawasaki	BHI	BHI	THR	THR	OUL	OUL	SNE	SNE	KNO	KNO	OUL	OUL	BHGP	BHGP	CAD	CAD	DON	DON	ASS	ASS	SIL; 22	SIL; 23	BHGP; 20	BHGP; 17	NC	0
