= Tayla Jones =

Australian motorcycle racer

- Born: 1996 (age 29–30); Yass, New South Wales
- Other name: Tayla 'MF' Jones
- Occupation: Professional off-road motorcyclist

Tayla Jones (born 1996) is an Australian off-road motorcycle racer, competing predominantly in endurance racing such as the ISDE. Her extensive successful racing career has given her recognition from GNCC racing for being representative of women's motorcycling in Australia since 2013, and GNCC considers her to be one of the most successful female off-roaders in recent memory.

== Overview ==
With an extended family involved in amateur motorsports, Jones was exposed to biking on a PW 50 since age 4. In interviews she regularly expresses thanks for her parents and sponsors who have enabled and supported her motorcycling career, including her wife and fellow competitor Allie Spurgeon-Jones. Debuting her career at age 16, she accomplished wins in Motocross, Super Moto, and Australian National Endurocross before moving to the US in 2017 to compete in the top US national off-roading championships, specialising in enduro sports.

Jones has a determined and motivated attitude to the sport despite several setbacks. She expresses in interviews after injuries in 2022 and 2025 that it does not marr her passion for the sport. She told GNCC interviewer in 2022 that "pain is temporary, glory is forever", and explained in a 2020 interview how she maintains her drive. Jones said she doesn't "believe champions are made without rough patches", which adds fuel to her fire. This mindset keeps her competing and keen to inspire young women to join the sport.

== Achievements ==
Jones loves sprint enduro style racing, and is a 6-time champion. She won six FIM ISDE competitions in a row in the female categories between 2013 and 2018. This streak resulted in her being awarded AMA female racer of the year award in 2017.

Following her move to the US, she won 3 GNCC WXC titles from 2017 to 2019. After suffering an injury to her hand in 2020 during a Full Gas Sprint Enduro competition she maintained motivation to compete in the rest of the sport season.

In 2022, visa issues prevented Jones from competing in the ISDE as part of the Australian women's team, being replaced by Ebony Nielson after her forced withdrawal.

Jones suffered a second major injury to her leg in 2025 during that season's GNCC round, leading to her withdrawal from that year's ISDE and further GNCC racing. She was replaced by Madison Healey in the 2025 ISDE team, and remains in recovery. Jones remains committed to racing and women's inclusion in the sport overall, and was inducted into the Australian Motorsports Hall of Fame in April 2025, which recognises individuals who have made significant contributions to Australian motorsports.
