= 2008 European Superstock 600 Championship =

Motorcycle racing series

2008 European Superstock 600 Championship
Previous:	2007	Next:	2009
Support series: Superbike World Championship; Supersport World Championship; FIM Superstock 1000 Cup

The 2008 European Superstock 600 Championship was the fourth season of the European Superstock 600 Championship. The season was contested over tenth races, beginning at Circuit Ricardo Tormo on 6 April and ending at Algarve International Circuit on 2 November. Loris Baz clinched the title after beating closest rival Marco Bussolotti.

== Race calendar and results ==
2008 Calendar
Round	Date	Round	Circuit	Pole position	Fastest lap	Race winner	Winning team
1	6 April	Spain	Valencia	(Italy) Danilo Petrucci	(Italy) Danilo Petrucci	(France) Loris Baz	YZF Yamaha Junior Team
2	27 April	Netherlands	Assen	(Italy) Danilo Petrucci	(United Kingdom) Dan Linfoot	(United Kingdom) Dan Linfoot	Beowulf Racing
3	10 May	Italy	Monza	(France) Loris Baz	(Italy) Marco Bussolotti	(France) Loris Baz	YZF Yamaha Junior Team
4	15 June	Germany	Nürburgring	(Czech Republic) Patrik Vostárek	(France) Loris Baz	(Czech Republic) Patrik Vostárek	Intermoto Czech
5	29 June	San Marino	Misano	(Czech Republic) Patrik Vostárek	(France) Loris Baz	(Czech Republic) Patrik Vostárek	Intermoto Czech
6	19 July	Czech Republic	Brno Circuit	(Czech Republic) Patrik Vostárek	(Czech Republic) Patrik Vostárek	(Czech Republic) Patrik Vostárek	Intermoto Czech
7	3 August	United Kingdom	Brands Hatch	(France) Loris Baz	(France) Loris Baz	(France) Loris Baz	YZF Yamaha Junior Team
8	7 September	Europe	Donington	(Italy) Marco Bussolotti	(Italy) Marco Bussolotti	(Italy) Marco Bussolotti	Yamaha Motor Italia J.T.
9	5 October	France	Magny-Cours	(United Kingdom) Gino Rea	(France) Loris Baz	(United Kingdom) Dan Linfoot	Team StoneBaker
10	2 November	Portugal	Algarve	(United Kingdom) Gino Rea	(France) Loris Baz	(United Kingdom) Gino Rea	Team StoneBaker

== Entry list ==
Team	Constructor	Motorcycle	No.	Rider	Rounds
Azione Corse	Honda	Honda CBR600RR	12	(United Kingdom) Sam Lowes	All
Brian Racing Team	Honda	Honda CBR600RR	61	(France) Anthony Loiseau	9
Hanspree IDS Ten Kate Honda	Honda	Honda CBR600RR	15	(Netherlands) Hugo Van Den Berg	10
Hanspree IDS Ten Kate Honda	Honda	Honda CBR600RR	111	(Czech Republic) Michal Šembera	1–9
HP Racing Team	Honda	Honda CBR600RR	35	(Italy) Simone Grotzkyj	1–8
Intermoto Czech	Honda	Honda CBR600RR	66	(Poland) Mateusz Stoklosa	10
Intermoto Czech	Honda	Honda CBR600RR	77	(Czech Republic) Patrik Vostárek	1–8
Paddock Competicoes	Honda	Honda CBR600RR	141	(Portugal) Sérgio Batista	10
Direct CCTV Racedays; Racedays Superbike Academy	Honda	Honda CBR600RR	13	(United Kingdom) Lee Johnston	8–9
Direct CCTV Racedays; Racedays Superbike Academy	Honda	Honda CBR600RR	56	(United Kingdom) David Paton	1–4, 6–7
Direct CCTV Racedays; Racedays Superbike Academy	Honda	Honda CBR600RR	63	(Republic of Ireland) BJ Toal	10
Direct CCTV Racedays; Racedays Superbike Academy	Honda	Honda CBR600RR	64	(United States) Josh Day	8–10
Direct CCTV Racedays; Racedays Superbike Academy	Honda	Honda CBR600RR	96	(United Kingdom) Daniel Brill	1–4, 6–7
Strichting Race Tegen Kanker	Honda	Honda CBR600RR	92	(Netherlands) Willem Hommersom	9
Team Honda Merson	Honda	Honda CBR600RR	27	(Spain) Daniel Arcas	1
Team Lorini	Honda	Honda CBR600RR	3	(Italy) Giuliano Gregorini	1–9
Team Lorini	Honda	Honda CBR600RR	34	(Italy) Fabio Massei	10
Team Lorini	Honda	Honda CBR600RR	42	(Italy) Leonardo Biliotti	All
Gold Fren Team Erinac	Kawasaki	Kawasaki ZX-6R	69	(Czech Republic) Ondřej Ježek	1, 4, 6
MSS Colchester Kawasaki	Kawasaki	Kawasaki ZX-6R	30	(Republic of Ireland) Jamie Hamilton	7
O Six Kawasaki Supported	Kawasaki	Kawasaki ZX-6R	6	(Italy) Andrea Boscoscuro	1–4
O Six Kawasaki Supported	Kawasaki	Kawasaki ZX-6R	21	(United Kingdom) Alex Lowes	1–9
O Six Kawasaki Supported	Kawasaki	Kawasaki ZX-6R	40	(Spain) Roman Ramos	6–7
Amici Racing Team	Suzuki	Suzuki GSX-R600	19	(Netherlands) Nigel Walraven	2, 8
Cruciani Moto Suzuki Italia	Suzuki	Suzuki GSX-R600	24	(Italy) Daniele Beretta	All
Cruciani Moto Suzuki Italia	Suzuki	Suzuki GSX-R600	47	(Italy) Eddi La Marra	All
Moto-ECK Racing Team	Suzuki	Suzuki GSX-R600	39	(Germany) Steven Michels	1
MTM Racing Team	Suzuki	Suzuki GSX-R600	55	(Belgium) Vincent Lonbois	All
TKR Suzuki Switzerland	Suzuki	Suzuki GSX-R600	23	(Switzerland) Christian Von Gunten	All
TKR Suzuki Switzerland	Suzuki	Suzuki GSX-R600	57	(Denmark) Kenny Tirsgaard	All
Payet Racing Team Triumph	Triumph	Triumph 675	4	(France) Baptiste Guittet	9
Triumph Italia BE1 Racing	Triumph	Triumph 675	36	(Italy) Davide Fanelli	5, 7–9
Triumph - SC	Triumph	Triumph 675	17	(United Kingdom) Robbie Stewart	1–3, 5–8
Triumph - SC	Triumph	Triumph 675	70	(United Kingdom) Thomas Grant	1–2, 6
Bevilacqua Corse	Yamaha	Yamaha YZF-R6	32	(Italy) Gianluca Capitini	3
Beowulf Racing; Team StoneBaker	Yamaha	Yamaha YZF-R6	44	(United Kingdom) Gino Rea	All
Beowulf Racing; Team StoneBaker	Yamaha	Yamaha YZF-R6	45	(United Kingdom) Dan Linfoot	All
Doorakkers Racing	Yamaha	Yamaha YZF-R6	22	(Netherlands) Sveti Alexandrov	2
Excel Performance Yamaha	Yamaha	Yamaha YZF-R6	16	(United Kingdom) Leon Hunt	7–8
FCC Corse	Yamaha	Yamaha YZF-R6	6	(Italy) Andrea Boscoscuro	6
Grillini PBR Team	Yamaha	Yamaha YZF-R6	91	(Sweden) Hampus Johansson	All
Labronica Racing	Yamaha	Yamaha YZF-R6	191	(Italy) Nico Morelli	3
No Limits Trackdays Team	Yamaha	Yamaha YZF-R6	53	(United Kingdom) Joe Burns	8
Orelac Racing by Galvin Team	Yamaha	Yamaha YZF-R6	10	(Spain) Nacho Calero	All
Otomoto RT	Yamaha	Yamaha YZF-R6	37	(Poland) Andrzej Chmielewski	6
PCP Peko Racing Team	Yamaha	Yamaha YZF-R6	99	(United Kingdom) Gregg Black	All
Stokson Racing Team	Yamaha	Yamaha YZF-R6	66	(Poland) Mateusz Stoklosa	6, 9
Tati Team	Yamaha	Yamaha YZF-R6	29	(France) William Grarre	9
Team ASPI	Yamaha	Yamaha YZF-R6	11	(France) Jérémy Guarnoni	All
Team ASPI	Yamaha	Yamaha YZF-R6	93	(France) Matthieu Lussiana	All
Team Falcone Competition	Yamaha	Yamaha YZF-R6	18	(France) Nicolas Pouhair	All
Team Falcone Competition	Yamaha	Yamaha YZF-R6	94	(France) Mathieu Gines	7, 9–10
Team SMW	Yamaha	Yamaha YZF-R6	155	(France) Etienne Masson	9
Team Trasimeno	Yamaha	Yamaha YZF-R6	7	(Italy) Renato Costantini	1–2, 4–7, 9–10
Team Trasimeno	Yamaha	Yamaha YZF-R6	119	(Italy) Danilo Petrucci	All
TK Racing	Yamaha	Yamaha YZF-R6	54	(United Kingdom) Jack Groves	7
VD Heyden Motors Yamaha	Yamaha	Yamaha YZF-R6	72	(Norway) Fredrik Karlsen	All
Yamaha Motor Italia J.T.	Yamaha	Yamaha YZF-R6	5	(Italy) Marco Bussolotti	All
Yamaha Shel Cetelem Iamaloures	Yamaha	Yamaha YZF-R6	117	(Portugal) André Carvalho	10
Yamaha Spain	Yamaha	Yamaha YZF-R6	88	(Spain) Yannick Guerra	All
YZF Yamaha Junior Team	Yamaha	Yamaha YZF-R6	76	(France) Loris Baz	All
Zone Rouge	Yamaha	Yamaha YZF-R6	14	(Belgium) Nicolas Pirot	1–9
Zone Rouge	Yamaha	Yamaha YZF-R6	73	(Netherlands) Joey Litjens	10

Key
Regular rider
Wildcard rider
Replacement rider

- All entries used Pirelli tyres.

== Championship' standings ==
=== Riders' standings ===
Pos	Rider	Bike	VAL (Spain)	ASS (Netherlands)	MNZ (Italy)	NÜR (Germany)	MIS (San Marino)	BRN (Czech Republic)	BRA (United Kingdom)	DON (Europe)	MAG (France)	POR (Portugal)	Pts
1	(France) Loris Baz	Yamaha	1	5	**1**	2	3	2	**1**	12	2	2	186
2	(Italy) Marco Bussolotti	Yamaha	Ret	7	2	5	2	5	5	**1**	5	3	134
3	(United Kingdom) Gino Rea	Yamaha	9	9	8	3	9	3	2	3	**6**	**1**	132
4	(Czech Republic) Patrik Vostárek	Honda	11	2	6	**1**	**1**	**1**	Ret	5			121
5	(United Kingdom) Dan Linfoot	Yamaha	3	1	DNS	6	6	4	Ret	4	1	11	117
6	(Italy) Daniele Beretta	Suzuki	4	4	3	23	5	Ret	3	Ret	7	6	88
7	(Italy) Danilo Petrucci	Yamaha	**2**	**Ret**	4	8	7	10	4	DNS	11	7	83
8	(Belgium) Vincent Lonbois	Suzuki	12	3	Ret	13	4	Ret	DSQ	7	4	4	71
9	(United Kingdom) Gregg Black	Yamaha	Ret	6	16	7	8	6	8	Ret	8	26	53
10	(Italy) Eddi La Marra	Suzuki	8	8	7	25	11	13	6	10	Ret	24	49
11	(Italy) Leonardo Biliotti	Honda	6	Ret	5	21	DSQ	8	22	9	17	16	36
12	(Italy) Giuliano Gregorini	Honda	5	24	10	4	12	20	19	15	WD		35
13	(France) Mathieu Gines	Yamaha							7		3	14	27
14	(Italy) Renato Costantini	Yamaha	10	WD		10	14	Ret	9		14	20	23
15	(Denmark) Kenny Tirsgaard	Suzuki	28	14	12	11	18	19	27	20	9	13	21
16	(United Kingdom) Alex Lowes	Kawasaki	25	Ret	Ret	27	21	26	20	2	21		20
17	(Sweden) Hampus Johansson	Yamaha	7	11	Ret	17	10	Ret	29	Ret	Ret	25	20
18	(France) Mathieu Lussiana	Yamaha	18	15	Ret	9	Ret	11	26	Ret	Ret	9	20
19	(France) Jérémy Guarnoni	Yamaha	Ret	20	Ret	15	16	14	11	19	12	10	18
20	(United Kingdom) Sam Lowes	Honda	27	Ret	13	26	20	12	Ret	6	22	28	17
21	(United States) Josh Day	Honda								14	18	5	13
22	(Czech Republic) Ondřej Ježek	Kawasaki	17			12		7					13
23	(Czech Republic) Michal Šembera	Honda	14	Ret	Ret	14	Ret	Ret	12	17	15		9
24	(United Kingdom) Lee Johnston	Honda								8	Ret		8
25	(Italy) Fabio Massei	Honda										8	8
26	(Norway) Fredrik Karlsen	Yamaha	22	10	Ret	18	17	15	28	Ret	Ret	15	8
27	(Spain) Yannick Guerra	Yamaha	21	21	11	24	19	16	16	18	13	19	8
28	(Italy) Gianluca Capitini	Yamaha			9								7
29	(France) Nicolas Pouhair	Yamaha	16	16	Ret	WD	24	9	17	Ret	16	23	7
30	(United Kingdom) David Paton	Honda	20	12	Ret	16		18	13				7
31	(United Kingdom) Leon Hunt	Yamaha							10	Ret			6
32	(France) Etienne Masson	Yamaha									10		6
33	(United Kingdom) Joe Burns	Yamaha								11			5
34	(Switzerland) Christian Von Gunten	Suzuki	29	23	14	20	25	Ret	21	13	20	21	5
35	(Netherlands) Joey Litjens	Yamaha										12	4
36	(Italy) Simone Grotzkyj	Honda	Ret	WD	15	Ret	13	Ret	DNS	WD			4
37	(Spain) Nacho Calero	Yamaha	13	19	Ret	Ret	22	21	25	22	Ret	27	3
38	(Italy) Andrea Boscoscuro	Kawasaki	19	13	Ret	22							3
38	(Italy) Andrea Boscoscuro	Yamaha						Ret					3
39	(Italy) Davide Fanelli	Triumph					15		14	Ret	19		3
40	(United Kingdom) Thomas Grant	Triumph	15	WD				WD					1
41	(Republic of Ireland) Jamie Hamilton	Kawasaki							15				1
	(United Kingdom) Robbie Stewart	Triumph	23	17	Ret		23	25	23	16			0
	(Poland) Andrzej Chmielewski	Yamaha						17					0
	(Portugal) André Carvalho	Yamaha										17	0
	(United Kingdom) Daniel Brill	Honda	24	18	Ret	19		WD	18				0
	(Republic of Ireland) BJ Toal	Honda										18	0
	(Netherlands) Nigel Walraven	Suzuki		Ret						21			0
	(Belgium) Nicolas Pirot	Yamaha	30	22	Ret	28	26	24	Ret	Ret	Ret		0
	(Poland) Mateusz Stoklosa	Yamaha						22			24		0
	(Poland) Mateusz Stoklosa	Honda										29	0
	(Netherlands) Hugo Van Den Berg	Honda										22	0
	(Spain) Roman Ramos	Kawasaki						23	30				0
	(Netherlands) Willem Hommersom	Honda									23		0
	(United Kingdom) Jack Groves	Yamaha							24				0
	(Germany) Steven Michels	Suzuki	26										0
	(Netherlands) Sveti Alexandrov	Yamaha		Ret									0
	(Italy) Nico Morelli	Yamaha			Ret								0
	(France) Anthony Loiseau	Honda									Ret		0
	(France) Baptiste Guittet	Triumph									Ret		0
	(Spain) Daniel Arcas	Honda	DSQ										0
	(Portugal) Sergio Batista	Honda										DSQ	0
	(France) William Grarre	Yamaha									DNQ		
Pos	Rider	Bike	VAL (Spain)	ASS (Netherlands)	MNZ (Italy)	NÜR (Germany)	MIS (San Marino)	BRN (Czech Republic)	BRA (United Kingdom)	DON (Europe)	MAG (France)	POR (Portugal)	Pts

Colour	Result
Gold	Winner
Silver	Second place
Bronze	Third place
Green	Points classification
Blue	Non-points classification
Blue	Non-classified finish (NC)
Purple	Retired, not classified (Ret)
Red	Did not qualify (DNQ)
Red	Did not pre-qualify (DNPQ)
Black	Disqualified (DSQ)
White	Did not start (DNS)
White	Withdrew (WD)
White	Race cancelled (C)
Blank	Did not practice (DNP)
Blank	Did not arrive (DNA)
Blank	Excluded (EX)

**Bold** – Pole position
Italics – Fastest lap
Source :
