= Jamie Hamilton (motorcyclist) =

British motorcycle racer

- Nationality: Northern Irish
- Born: 24 March 1991 (age 35); Ballymena
- Current team: Cookstown BE Racing (adviser)
- Bike number: 44

Jamie Hamilton (born 24 March 1991, in Ballymena) is a Northern Irish motorcycle road racer. He competed in International road races aboard a Suzuki GSX-R1000, a Honda CBR600RR and a Kawasaki ER6. Hamilton suffered major injuries when crashing during the TT races in June 2015, and was discharged from Royal Victoria Hospital, Belfast in August, needing future surgery to extend his badly-broken leg.

== Career ==
Hamilton initially pursued a career as a footballer playing for Leicester City under 9's, and Bolton Wanderers under 11's. However after being taken to a local motocross track in his home town, he was spotted by Harry Corbett, a professional Motocross race team manager and from there progressed to Mini-motos, where he won multiple races, and from there to short circuit racing, and real road racing in Ireland and the Isle of Man TT races.

=== Starting off ===
In 2004, at age 13, Hamilton won his first race in the Aprilia 125 club race at Nutts Corner. In 2005, he finished eighth in the Aprilia superteam championship with one win at Knockhill that year. In 2006, he competed in the CB500 Superclub and club championships where he finished first in the club championship, and second in the superclub championship, breaking the lap record at multiple tracks over the course of the season.

=== British Supersport & Superstock 600 ===
In 2007, Hamilton competed in the British Supersport 600 championship, setting the world record as the youngest racer ever to compete in British Supersport. He was treated for minor injuries for his involvement in the incident that killed Guy Sanders at Mondello Park.

In 2008, Hamilton competed in British Superstock riding for MSS Colchester Kawasaki, where he finished third in his first race of the season at Thruxton, and later clinching fourth place at Donington.

In 2009, Hamilton raced in the Metzeler National Superstock 600 Championship for Gearlink Kawasaki, the official KMUK British Supersport team. Hamilton started riding for Gearlink Kawasaki in the third round and went on to win the championship.

== Career statistics ==
2008 - 41st, European Superstock 600 Championship, Kawasaki ZX-6R
2009 - NC, European Superstock 600 Championship, Kawasaki ZX-6R

=== European Superstock 600 ===
==== Races by year ====
(key) (Races in bold indicate pole position, races in italics indicate fastest lap)

| Year | Bike | 1 | 2 | 3 | 4 | 5 | 6 | 7 | 8 | 9 | 10 | Pos | Pts |
|---|---|---|---|---|---|---|---|---|---|---|---|---|---|
| 2008 | Kawasaki | VAL | ASS | MNZ | NÜR | MIS | BRN | BRA; 15 | DON | MAG | POR | 41st | 1 |
| 2009 | Kawasaki | VAL | ASS | MNZ | MIS | SIL; Ret | BRN | NÜR | IMO | MAG | POR | NC | 0 |

=== British Supersport Championship ===
(key) (Races in bold indicate pole position) (Races in italics indicate fastest lap)

| Year | Make | 1 | 2 | 3 | 4 | 5 | 6 | 7 | 8 | 9 | 10 | 11 | 12 | Pos | Pts |
|---|---|---|---|---|---|---|---|---|---|---|---|---|---|---|---|
| 2009 | Kawasaki | BHI | OUL | DON | THR | SNE | KNO | MAL | BHGP | CAD | CRO | SIL | OUL; 20 | NC | 0 |
| 2010 | Kawasaki | BHI; 25 | THR; 17 | OUL; Ret | CAD; DNS | MAL; 14 | KNO; DNS | SNE | BHGP | CAD | CRO; 13 | SIL; Ret | OUL | 30th | 5 |
