= Hugo van den Berg =

Dutch motorcycle racer

- Nationality: Dutch
- Born: 23 May 1990 (age 36); Hulshorst, Netherlands Partner Jenna Van Den Berg (Vissers) Daughter Julia Van Den Berg

Hugo van den Berg is a Grand Prix motorcycle racer from the Netherlands.

== Career statistics ==
2008 - NC, European Superstock 600 Championship, Honda CBR600RR

=== Grand Prix motorcycle racing ===
==== By season ====
Season	Class	Motorcycle	Team	Number	Race	Win	Podium	Pole	FLap	Pts	Plcd
2005	125cc	Aprilia	Varenhof Racing Team	78	3	0	0	0	0	0	NC
2006	125cc	Aprilia	Varenhof Racing Team	78	6	0	0	0	0	0	NC
2007	125cc	Aprilia	Blusens Aprilia	56	12	0	0	0	0	0	NC
2008	125cc	Aprilia	Degraaf Grand Prix	56	17	0	0	0	0	1	35th
Total					**38**	**0**	**0**	**0**	**0**	**1**	

==== Races by year ====
Year	Class	Bike	1	2	3	4	5	6	7	8	9	10	11	12	13	14	15	16	17	Pos	Points
2005	125cc	Aprilia	SPA	POR	CHN	FRA	ITA	CAT; 29	NED; 31	GBR	GER; 25	CZE	JPN	MAL	QAT	AUS	TUR	VAL		NC	0
2006	125cc	Aprilia	SPA; 27	QAT	TUR	CHN	FRA; 26	ITA	CAT; 28	NED; Ret	GBR	GER	CZE; 24	MAL	AUS	JPN	POR	VAL; Ret		NC	0
2007	125cc	Aprilia	QAT; 24	SPA; 20	TUR; 26	CHN; 25	FRA; 24	ITA; 23	CAT; 25	GBR; 26	NED; 21	GER; 25	CZE; 27	RSM; 31	POR	JPN	AUS	MAL	VAL	NC	0
2008	125cc	Aprilia	QAT; Ret	SPA; Ret	POR; Ret	CHN; 19	FRA; Ret	ITA; 29	CAT; 21	GBR; 25	NED; 15	GER; Ret	CZE; 25	RSM; 24	INP; 21	JPN; Ret	AUS; Ret	MAL; Ret	VAL; Ret	35th	1

=== European Superstock 600 ===
==== Races by year ====
(key) (Races in bold indicate pole position, races in italics indicate fastest lap)

Year	Bike	1	2	3	4	5	6	7	8	9	10	Pos	Pts
2008	Honda	VAL	ASS	MNZ	NÜR	MIS	BRN	BRA	DON	MAG	POR; 22	NC	0
