= 2007 British motorcycle Grand Prix =

(United Kingdom) 2007 British Grand Prix
Race details
- Race 8 of 18 races in the 2007 Grand Prix motorcycle racing season
- Date: 24 June 2007
- Official name: Nickel & Dime British Grand Prix
- Location: Donington Park
- Course: Permanent racing facility; 4.023 km (2.500 mi)

MotoGP
Pole position
- Rider: (United States) Colin Edwards
- Time: 1:28.531
Fastest lap
- Rider: (Spain) Toni Elías
- Time: 1:41.428
Podium
- First: (Australia) Casey Stoner
- Second: (United States) Colin Edwards
- Third: (Australia) Chris Vermeulen

250cc
Pole position
- Rider: (San Marino) Alex de Angelis
- Time: 1:32.391
Fastest lap
- Rider: (San Marino) Alex de Angelis
- Time: 1:45.461
Podium
- First: (Italy) Andrea Dovizioso
- Second: (San Marino) Alex de Angelis
- Third: (Japan) Hiroshi Aoyama

125cc
Pole position
- Rider: (Italy) Mattia Pasini
- Time: 1:37.399
Fastest lap
- Rider: (Italy) Mattia Pasini
- Time: 1:38.188
Podium
- First: (Italy) Mattia Pasini
- Second: (Japan) Tomoyoshi Koyama
- Third: (Spain) Héctor Faubel

The 2007 British motorcycle Grand Prix was the eighth round of the 2007 MotoGP championship. It took place on the weekend of 22–24 June 2007 at Donington Park in Castle Donington, Great Britain.

== MotoGP classification ==
Pos.	No.	Rider	Team	Manufacturer	Laps	Time/Retired	Grid	Points
1	27	(Australia) Casey Stoner	Ducati Marlboro Team	Ducati	30	51:40.739	5	25
2	5	(United States) Colin Edwards	Fiat Yamaha Team	Yamaha	30	+11.768	1	20
3	71	(Australia) Chris Vermeulen	Rizla Suzuki MotoGP	Suzuki	30	+15.678	12	16
4	46	(Italy) Valentino Rossi	Fiat Yamaha Team	Yamaha	30	+21.827	2	13
5	21	(United States) John Hopkins	Rizla Suzuki MotoGP	Suzuki	30	+35.518	6	11
6	14	(France) Randy de Puniet	Kawasaki Racing Team	Kawasaki	30	+36.474	8	10
7	4	(Brazil) Alex Barros	Pramac d'Antin	Ducati	30	+38.094	15	9
8	26	(Spain) Dani Pedrosa	Repsol Honda Team	Honda	30	+38.992	3	8
9	66	(Germany) Alex Hofmann	Pramac d'Antin	Ducati	30	+39.239	14	7
10	33	(Italy) Marco Melandri	Honda Gresini	Honda	30	+1:01.526	9	6
11	13	(Australia) Anthony West	Kawasaki Racing Team	Kawasaki	30	+1:06.486	17	5
12	24	(Spain) Toni Elías	Honda Gresini	Honda	30	+1:34.074	10	4
13	80	(United States) Kurtis Roberts	Team Roberts	KR212V	29	+1 lap	19	3
14	56	(Japan) Shinya Nakano	Konica Minolta Honda	Honda	29	+1 lap	11	2
15	6	(Japan) Makoto Tamada	Dunlop Yamaha Tech 3	Yamaha	28	+2 laps	18	1
16	50	(France) Sylvain Guintoli	Dunlop Yamaha Tech 3	Yamaha	28	+2 laps	16	
17	1	(United States) Nicky Hayden	Repsol Honda Team	Honda	26	+4 laps	4	
Ret	65	(Italy) Loris Capirossi	Ducati Marlboro Team	Ducati	24	Accident	13	
Ret	7	(Spain) Carlos Checa	Honda LCR	Honda	4	Accident	7	

== 250 cc classification ==
Pos.	No.	Rider	Manufacturer	Laps	Time/Retired	Grid	Points
1	34	(Italy) Andrea Dovizioso	Honda	27	48:40.173	6	25
2	3	(San Marino) Alex de Angelis	Aprilia	27	+22.102	1	20
3	4	(Japan) Hiroshi Aoyama	KTM	27	+1:03.137	10	16
4	55	(Japan) Yuki Takahashi	Honda	27	+1:03.370	11	13
5	73	(Japan) Shuhei Aoyama	Honda	27	+1:25.269	12	11
6	36	(Finland) Mika Kallio	KTM	27	+2:07.333	5	10
7	60	(Spain) Julián Simón	Honda	26	+1 lap	3	9
8	8	(Thailand) Ratthapark Wilairot	Honda	26	+1 lap	17	8
9	45	(United Kingdom) Dan Linfoot	Aprilia	26	+1 lap	21	7
10	17	(Czech Republic) Karel Abraham	Aprilia	26	+1 lap	24	6
11	32	(Italy) Fabrizio Lai	Aprilia	26	+1 lap	14	5
12	28	(Germany) Dirk Heidolf	Aprilia	26	+1 lap	19	4
13	44	(Japan) Taro Sekiguchi	Aprilia	26	+1 lap	22	3
14	25	(Italy) Alex Baldolini	Aprilia	26	+1 lap	18	2
15	10	(Hungary) Imre Tóth	Aprilia	26	+1 lap	23	1
16	7	(Spain) Efrén Vázquez	Aprilia	25	+2 laps	25	
17	81	(United Kingdom) Toby Markham	Yamaha	25	+2 laps	26	
Ret	41	(Spain) Aleix Espargaró	Aprilia	23	Retirement	16	
Ret	15	(Italy) Roberto Locatelli	Gilera	14	Accident	13	
Ret	16	(France) Jules Cluzel	Aprilia	14	Retirement	20	
Ret	1	(Spain) Jorge Lorenzo	Aprilia	10	Accident	2	
Ret	12	(Switzerland) Thomas Lüthi	Aprilia	10	Accident	9	
Ret	58	(Italy) Marco Simoncelli	Gilera	9	Accident	7	
Ret	19	(Spain) Álvaro Bautista	Aprilia	8	Accident	4	
Ret	50	(Republic of Ireland) Eugene Laverty	Honda	6	Accident	15	
Ret	80	(Spain) Héctor Barberá	Aprilia	5	Retirement	8	
DNQ	82	(United Kingdom) Andrew Sawford	Yamaha		Did not qualify		
DNQ	83	(United Kingdom) Alex Kenchington	Yamaha		Did not qualify		
DNQ	84	(United Kingdom) Luke Lawrence	Honda		Did not qualify		
OFFICIAL 250cc REPORT

== 125 cc classification ==
Pos.	No.	Rider	Manufacturer	Laps	Time/Retired	Grid	Points
1	75	(Italy) Mattia Pasini	Aprilia	25	41:49.049	1	25
2	71	(Japan) Tomoyoshi Koyama	KTM	25	+3.253	3	20
3	55	(Spain) Héctor Faubel	Aprilia	25	+5.094	6	16
4	33	(Spain) Sergio Gadea	Aprilia	25	+6.781	5	13
5	6	(Spain) Joan Olivé	Aprilia	25	+7.212	10	11
6	63	(France) Mike Di Meglio	Honda	25	+7.335	15	10
7	38	(United Kingdom) Bradley Smith	Honda	25	+13.505	9	9
8	35	(Italy) Raffaele De Rosa	Aprilia	25	+13.885	12	8
9	22	(Spain) Pablo Nieto	Aprilia	25	+14.367	7	7
10	24	(Italy) Simone Corsi	Aprilia	25	+26.672	2	6
11	8	(Italy) Lorenzo Zanetti	Aprilia	25	+27.060	17	5
12	11	(Germany) Sandro Cortese	Aprilia	25	+27.403	16	4
13	34	(Switzerland) Randy Krummenacher	KTM	25	+38.212	11	3
14	31	(Spain) Enrique Jerez	Honda	25	+41.905	24	2
15	29	(Italy) Andrea Iannone	Aprilia	25	+48.782	14	1
16	95	(Romania) Robert Mureșan	Derbi	25	+1:05.000	26	
17	53	(Italy) Simone Grotzkyj	Aprilia	25	+1:05.720	31	
18	52	(Czech Republic) Lukáš Pešek	Derbi	25	+1:05.847	21	
19	7	(France) Alexis Masbou	Honda	25	+1:18.100	8	
20	60	(Austria) Michael Ranseder	Derbi	25	+1:18.438	18	
21	37	(Netherlands) Joey Litjens	Honda	25	+1:23.222	29	
22	82	(United Kingdom) Luke Jones	Honda	25	+1:24.001	33	
23	51	(United States) Stevie Bonsey	KTM	25	+1:24.309	30	
24	18	(Spain) Nicolás Terol	Derbi	25	+1:27.391	22	
25	99	(United Kingdom) Danny Webb	Honda	25	+1:33.592	37	
26	56	(Netherlands) Hugo van den Berg	Aprilia	25	+1:38.942	27	
27	83	(United Kingdom) Nikki Coates	Honda	25	+1:40.403	34	
28	84	(United Kingdom) Robbie Stewart	Honda	25	+1:40.553	32	
29	20	(Italy) Roberto Tamburini	Aprilia	24	+1 lap	19	
30	81	(United Kingdom) Tom Hayward	Honda	24	+1 lap	36	
Ret	15	(Italy) Federico Sandi	Aprilia	20	Retirement	23	
Ret	14	(Hungary) Gábor Talmácsi	Aprilia	19	Retirement	4	
Ret	54	(United Kingdom) Kev Coghlan	Honda	15	Retirement	35	
Ret	12	(Spain) Esteve Rabat	Honda	13	Accident	28	
Ret	27	(Italy) Stefano Bianco	Aprilia	10	Retirement	20	
Ret	44	(Spain) Pol Espargaró	Aprilia	10	Retirement	13	
Ret	77	(Switzerland) Dominique Aegerter	Aprilia	4	Accident	25	
OFFICIAL 125cc REPORT

== Championship standings after the race (MotoGP) ==
Below are the standings for the top five riders and constructors after round eight has concluded.

Riders' Championship standings

Pos.	Rider	Points
1	(Australia) Casey Stoner	165
2	(Italy) Valentino Rossi	139
3	(Spain) Dani Pedrosa	106
4	(Australia) Chris Vermeulen	88
5	(United States) John Hopkins	83

Constructors' Championship standings

Pos.	Constructor	Points
1	(Italy) Ducati	168
2	(Japan) Yamaha	146
3	(Japan) Honda	133
4	(Japan) Suzuki	111
5	(Japan) Kawasaki	49

- Note: Only the top five positions are included for both sets of standings.

Previous race: 2007 Catalan Grand Prix	FIM Grand Prix World Championship; 2007 season	Next race: 2007 Dutch TT
Previous race: 2006 British Grand Prix	British motorcycle Grand Prix	Next race: 2008 British Grand Prix
