= Nacho Calero =

Spanish motorcycle racer

- Nationality: Spanish
- Born: 5 July 1991 (age 35); Valencia, Spain
- Current team: Orelac Racing VerdNatura
- Bike number: 10
Motorcycle racing career statistics
Supersport World Championship
Active years	2013–2019
Manufacturers	Honda, Kawasaki
Starts / Wins / Podiums / Poles / F. laps / Points; 79 / 0 / 0 / 0 / 0 / 18

Ignacio "Nacho" Calero Pérez (born 5 July 1991) is a Spanish motorcycle racer. He last competed in the Supersport World Championship aboard a Kawasaki ZX-6R.

== Career ==
=== European Superstock 600 Championship ===
In 2008, Calero made his debut in the European Superstock 600 Championship. He endured a difficult rookie season as he only scored three points in ten races. In 2009, Calero improved as he finished 18th in the standings scoring 17 points. 2010 proved to be a breakthrough season for Calero as he finished ninth in the Championship with 59 points. He also scored his first career podium when he finished third at Misano. Calero fell back in 2011 as he finished 15th in the standings with a best finish of sixth at Assen. He did however set the fastest race lap at Monza, the first time he did so in his career. Calero made a strong start to the 2012 season with two second places at Imola and Assen. At that point, he was second in the Championship, but after not scoring a podium for the rest of the season, Calero fell back to ninth in the Championship.

=== Supersport World Championship ===
In 2013, Calero stepped up to the Supersport World Championship riding a Honda CBR600RR for the Honda PTR team. It was a real hard season for Calero and he did not score any points that season. Calero remained with the team for the 2014 season. He kept struggling but he did score his first points with a 13th-place finish at Phillip Island. He moved to the Orelac Racing Team for the 2015. The season turned out to be a disappointment as Calero only scored points once in the last round of the season at Qatar.

== Career statistics ==
2008 - 37th, European Superstock 600 Championship, Yamaha YZF-R6
2009 - 18th, European Superstock 600 Championship, Yamaha YZF-R6 Kawasaki ZX-6R
2010 - 9th, European Superstock 600 Championship, Yamaha YZF-R6
2011 - 15th, European Superstock 600 Championship, Yamaha YZF-R6
2012 - 9th, European Superstock 600 Championship, Yamaha YZF-R6

=== European Superstock 600 ===
==== Races by year ====
(key) (Races in bold indicate pole position, races in italics indicate fastest lap)

Year	Bike	1	2	3	4	5	6	7	8	9	10	Pos	Pts
2008	Yamaha	VAL; 13	ASS; 19	MNZ; Ret	NÜR; Ret	MIS; 22	BRN; 21	BRA; 25	DON; 22	MAG; Ret	POR; 27	37th	3
2009	Kawasaki/Yamaha	VAL; 11	ASS; 16	MNZ; 15	MIS; 16	SIL; 14	BRN; 13	NÜR; 12	IMO	MAG	POR; 14	18th	17
2010	Yamaha	POR; 4	VAL; Ret	ASS; 10	MNZ; 7	MIS; 3	BRN; Ret	SIL; 9	NÜR; WD	IMO; 18	MAG; 8	9th	59
2011	Yamaha	ASS; 6	MNZ; 9	MIS; 14	ARA; Ret	BRN; 8	SIL; 10	NÜR; Ret	IMO; 19	MAG; 14	POR; Ret	15th	35
2012	Yamaha	IMO; 2	ASS; 2	MNZ; 6	MIS; 18	ARA; Ret	BRN; 18	SIL; 12	NÜR; 18	POR; 11	MAG; 20	9th	61

=== Supersport World Championship ===
==== Races by year ====
(key)

Year	Bike	1	2	3	4	5	6	7	8	9	10	11	12	13	Pos.	Pts
2013	Honda	AUS; 19	SPA; Ret	NED; 21	ITA; 20	GBR; NC	POR; 19	ITA; 21	RUS; C	GBR; 27	GER; 28	TUR; 21	FRA; Ret	SPA; 22	NC	0
2014	Honda	AUS; 13	SPA; 20	NED; 17	ITA; 17	GBR; DNS	MAL; Ret	ITA; 23	POR; 20	SPA; 22	FRA; 18	QAT; 19			30th	3
2015	Kawasaki	AUS; Ret	THA												30th	3
2015	Honda			SPA; 17	NED; 17	ITA; Ret	GBR; 18	POR; 16	ITA; 17	MAL; 18	SPA; 20	FRA; 22	QAT; 13		30th	3
2016	Kawasaki	AUS; 18	THA; 19	SPA; 15	NED; 26	ITA; 22	MAL; 21	GBR; 24	ITA; Ret	GER; 24	FRA; 17	SPA; Ret	QAT; Ret		39th	1
2017	Kawasaki	AUS; 9	THA; 13	SPA; 18	NED; 19	ITA; 21	GBR; 22	ITA; 16	GER; 18	POR; Ret	FRA; Ret	SPA; Ret	QAT; 17		28th	10
2018	Kawasaki	AUS; 18	THA; Ret	SPA; 17	NED; 17	ITA; 22	GBR; Ret	CZE; 21	ITA; Ret	POR; Ret	FRA; 24	ARG; 20	QAT; 15		36th	1
2019	Kawasaki	AUS; 17	THA; 18	SPA; Ret	NED; DNS	ITA; 19	SPA; 17	ITA; 22	GBR; 19	POR; 17	FRA; Ret	ARG; DNQ	QAT; 21		NC	0
