= 2007 German motorcycle Grand Prix =

Tenth round of the 2007 MotoGP championship

(Germany) 2007 German Grand Prix
Race details
- Race 10 of 18 races in the 2007 Grand Prix motorcycle racing season
- Date: 15 July 2007
- Official name: Alice Motorrad Grand Prix Deutschland
- Location: Sachsenring
- Course: Permanent racing facility; 3.671 km (2.281 mi)

MotoGP
Pole position
- Rider: (Australia) Casey Stoner
- Time: 1:22.384
Fastest lap
- Rider: (Spain) Dani Pedrosa
- Time: 1:23.082
Podium
- First: (Spain) Dani Pedrosa
- Second: (Italy) Loris Capirossi
- Third: (United States) Nicky Hayden

250cc
Pole position
- Rider: (Finland) Mika Kallio
- Time: 1:24.413
Fastest lap
- Rider: (Finland) Mika Kallio
- Time: 1:24.762
Podium
- First: (Japan) Hiroshi Aoyama
- Second: (Finland) Mika Kallio
- Third: (San Marino) Alex de Angelis

125cc
Pole position
- Rider: (Hungary) Gábor Talmácsi
- Time: 1:26.839
Fastest lap
- Rider: (Hungary) Gábor Talmácsi
- Time: 1:26.909
Podium
- First: (Hungary) Gábor Talmácsi
- Second: (Japan) Tomoyoshi Koyama
- Third: (Spain) Héctor Faubel

The 2007 German motorcycle Grand Prix was the tenth round of the 2007 MotoGP championship. It took place on the weekend of 13–15 July 2007 at the Sachsenring in Hohenstein-Ernstthal, Germany.

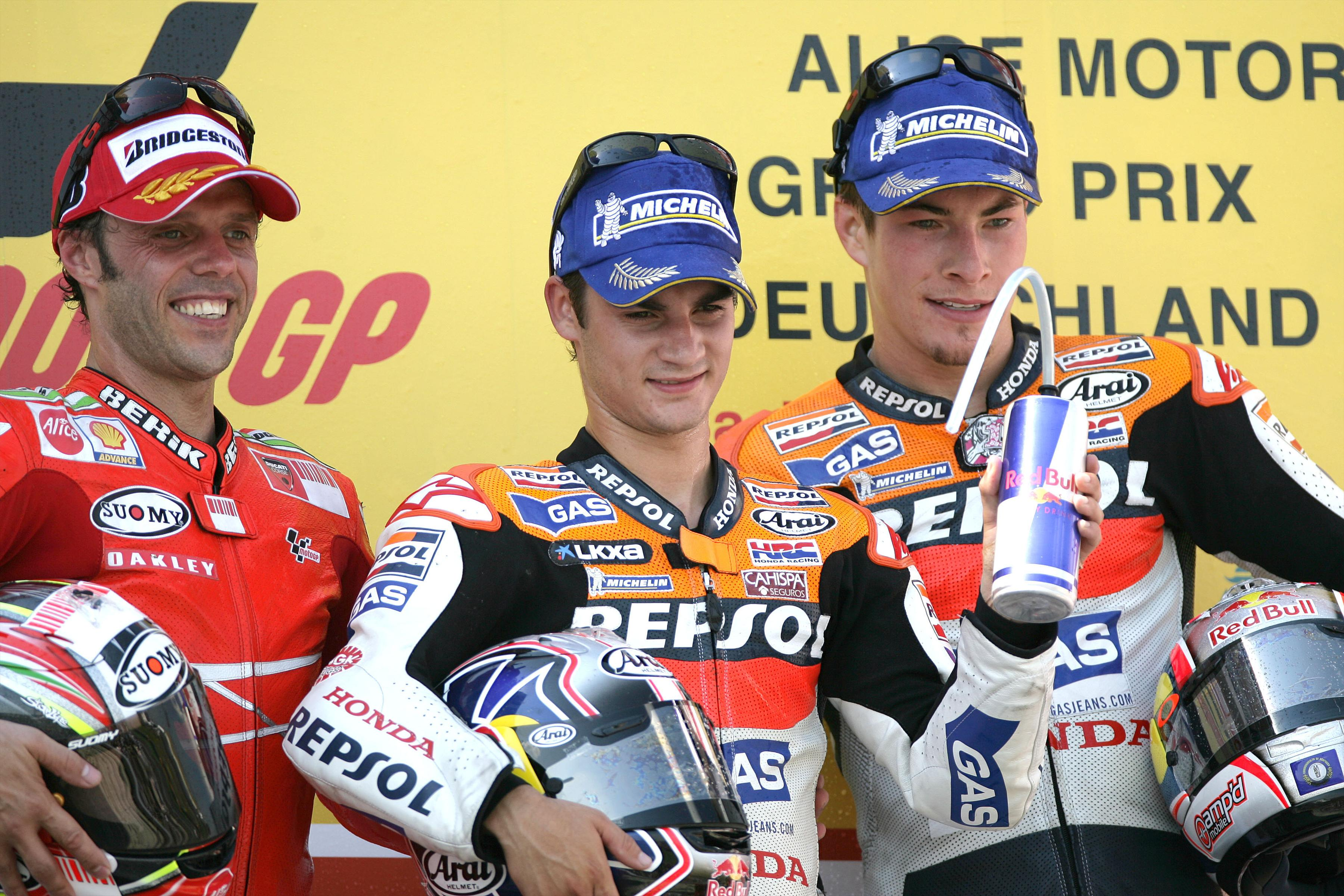
Loris Capirossi, Dani Pedrosa and Nicky Hayden, celebrating on the podium after finishing second, first and third in the MotoGP race.

== MotoGP classification ==
Pos.	No.	Rider	Team	Manufacturer	Laps	Time/Retired	Grid	Points
1	26	(Spain) Dani Pedrosa	Repsol Honda Team	Honda	30	41:53.196	2	25
2	65	(Italy) Loris Capirossi	Ducati Marlboro Team	Ducati	30	+13.166	7	20
3	1	(United States) Nicky Hayden	Repsol Honda Team	Honda	30	+16.771	14	16
4	5	(United States) Colin Edwards	Fiat Yamaha Team	Yamaha	30	+18.299	13	13
5	27	(Australia) Casey Stoner	Ducati Marlboro Team	Ducati	30	+31.426	1	11
6	33	(Italy) Marco Melandri	Honda Gresini	Honda	30	+31.917	3	10
7	21	(United States) John Hopkins	Rizla Suzuki MotoGP	Suzuki	30	+33.395	5	9
8	13	(Australia) Anthony West	Kawasaki Racing Team	Kawasaki	30	+41.194	12	8
9	66	(Germany) Alex Hofmann	Pramac d'Antin	Ducati	30	+43.214	16	7
10	84	(Italy) Michel Fabrizio	Honda Gresini	Honda	30	+44.459	17	6
11	71	(Australia) Chris Vermeulen	Rizla Suzuki MotoGP	Suzuki	30	+1:01.894	11	5
12	80	(United States) Kurtis Roberts	Team Roberts	KR212V	30	+1:10.721	19	4
13	6	(Japan) Makoto Tamada	Dunlop Yamaha Tech 3	Yamaha	28	+2 laps	18	3
14	7	(Spain) Carlos Checa	Honda LCR	Honda	27	+3 laps	15	2
Ret	14	(France) Randy de Puniet	Kawasaki Racing Team	Kawasaki	29	Retirement	4	
Ret	56	(Japan) Shinya Nakano	Konica Minolta Honda	Honda	19	Retirement	10	
Ret	4	(Brazil) Alex Barros	Pramac d'Antin	Ducati	9	Accident	8	
Ret	46	(Italy) Valentino Rossi	Fiat Yamaha Team	Yamaha	5	Accident	6	
Ret	50	(France) Sylvain Guintoli	Dunlop Yamaha Tech 3	Yamaha	3	Accident	9	

== 250 cc classification ==
Pos.	No.	Rider	Manufacturer	Laps	Time/Retired	Grid	Points
1	4	(Japan) Hiroshi Aoyama	KTM	29	41:16.191	6	25
2	36	(Finland) Mika Kallio	KTM	29	+0.119	1	20
3	3	(San Marino) Alex de Angelis	Aprilia	29	+0.274	3	16
4	1	(Spain) Jorge Lorenzo	Aprilia	29	+0.579	4	13
5	34	(Italy) Andrea Dovizioso	Honda	29	+1.296	2	11
6	80	(Spain) Héctor Barberá	Aprilia	29	+11.851	7	10
7	58	(Italy) Marco Simoncelli	Gilera	29	+17.308	8	9
8	55	(Japan) Yuki Takahashi	Honda	29	+22.309	10	8
9	12	(Switzerland) Thomas Lüthi	Aprilia	29	+28.858	12	7
10	15	(Italy) Roberto Locatelli	Gilera	29	+35.983	14	6
11	41	(Spain) Aleix Espargaró	Aprilia	29	+37.377	11	5
12	73	(Japan) Shuhei Aoyama	Honda	29	+42.211	17	4
13	28	(Germany) Dirk Heidolf	Aprilia	29	+51.095	13	3
14	25	(Italy) Alex Baldolini	Aprilia	29	+53.416	15	2
15	16	(France) Jules Cluzel	Aprilia	29	+55.996	21	1
16	44	(Japan) Taro Sekiguchi	Aprilia	29	+56.105	18	
17	19	(Spain) Álvaro Bautista	Aprilia	29	+1:07.435	9	
18	32	(Italy) Fabrizio Lai	Aprilia	29	+1:09.728	16	
19	8	(Thailand) Ratthapark Wilairot	Honda	29	+1:17.640	22	
Ret	17	(Czech Republic) Karel Abraham	Aprilia	19	Retirement	20	
Ret	38	(Germany) Thomas Walther	Honda	19	Accident	28	
Ret	50	(Republic of Ireland) Eugene Laverty	Honda	18	Accident	26	
Ret	60	(Spain) Julián Simón	Honda	14	Accident	5	
Ret	10	(Hungary) Imre Tóth	Aprilia	13	Retirement	24	
Ret	45	(United Kingdom) Dan Linfoot	Aprilia	4	Accident	25	
Ret	31	(Spain) Álvaro Molina	Aprilia	4	Retirement	23	
Ret	18	(Germany) Joshua Sommer	Honda	3	Retirement	27	
Ret	7	(Spain) Efrén Vázquez	Aprilia	2	Accident	19	
OFFICIAL 250cc REPORT

== 125 cc classification ==
Pos.	No.	Rider	Manufacturer	Laps	Time/Retired	Grid	Points
1	14	(Hungary) Gábor Talmácsi	Aprilia	27	39:30.802	1	25
2	71	(Japan) Tomoyoshi Koyama	KTM	27	+3.532	15	20
3	55	(Spain) Héctor Faubel	Aprilia	27	+3.610	3	16
4	24	(Italy) Simone Corsi	Aprilia	27	+4.444	7	13
5	34	(Switzerland) Randy Krummenacher	KTM	27	+11.851	8	11
6	52	(Czech Republic) Lukáš Pešek	Derbi	27	+11.920	5	10
7	11	(Germany) Sandro Cortese	Aprilia	27	+17.271	6	9
8	38	(United Kingdom) Bradley Smith	Honda	27	+19.484	4	8
9	22	(Spain) Pablo Nieto	Aprilia	27	+20.950	17	7
10	60	(Austria) Michael Ranseder	Derbi	27	+22.628	11	6
11	6	(Spain) Joan Olivé	Aprilia	27	+26.044	14	5
12	12	(Spain) Esteve Rabat	Honda	27	+27.096	10	4
13	17	(Germany) Stefan Bradl	Aprilia	27	+42.805	16	3
14	64	(Germany) Georg Fröhlich	Honda	27	+43.503	21	2
15	63	(France) Mike Di Meglio	Honda	27	+44.402	19	1
16	27	(Italy) Stefano Bianco	Aprilia	27	+46.386	22	
17	95	(Romania) Robert Mureșan	Derbi	27	+53.208	20	
18	51	(United States) Stevie Bonsey	KTM	27	+53.719	30	
19	7	(France) Alexis Masbou	Honda	27	+53.739	26	
20	20	(Italy) Roberto Tamburini	Aprilia	27	+53.887	18	
21	77	(Switzerland) Dominique Aegerter	Aprilia	27	+1:00.165	33	
22	18	(Spain) Nicolás Terol	Derbi	27	+1:00.625	28	
23	15	(Italy) Federico Sandi	Aprilia	27	+1:09.928	27	
24	29	(Italy) Andrea Iannone	Aprilia	27	+1:16.082	12	
25	56	(Netherlands) Hugo van den Berg	Aprilia	27	+1:18.721	31	
26	65	(Germany) Eric Hübsch	Aprilia	27	+1:18.836	36	
27	99	(United Kingdom) Danny Webb	Honda	27	+1:27.243	34	
28	8	(Italy) Lorenzo Zanetti	Aprilia	26	+1 lap	24	
29	67	(Germany) Sebastian Eckner	Honda	26	+1 lap	37	
Ret	33	(Spain) Sergio Gadea	Aprilia	26	Accident	9	
Ret	37	(Netherlands) Joey Litjens	Honda	25	Retirement	25	
Ret	53	(Italy) Simone Grotzkyj	Aprilia	15	Retirement	29	
Ret	75	(Italy) Mattia Pasini	Aprilia	11	Retirement	2	
Ret	35	(Italy) Raffaele De Rosa	Aprilia	8	Retirement	23	
Ret	66	(Germany) Patrick Unger	Aprilia	1	Retirement	32	
Ret	44	(Spain) Pol Espargaró	Aprilia	1	Retirement	13	
DNS	13	(Italy) Dino Lombardi	Honda	0	Did not start	35	
OFFICIAL 125cc REPORT

== Championship standings after the race (MotoGP) ==
Below are the standings for the top five riders and constructors after round ten has concluded.

Riders' Championship standings

Pos.	Rider	Points
1	(Australia) Casey Stoner	196
2	(Italy) Valentino Rossi	164
3	(Spain) Dani Pedrosa	144
4	(United States) John Hopkins	103
5	(Italy) Marco Melandri	97

Constructors' Championship standings

Pos.	Constructor	Points
1	(Italy) Ducati	208
2	(Japan) Yamaha	184
3	(Japan) Honda	174
4	(Japan) Suzuki	131
5	(Japan) Kawasaki	64

- Note: Only the top five positions are included for both sets of standings.

Previous race: 2007 Dutch TT	FIM Grand Prix World Championship; 2007 season	Next race: 2007 United States Grand Prix
Previous race: 2006 German Grand Prix	German motorcycle Grand Prix	Next race: 2008 German Grand Prix
