= 2007 Dutch TT =

(Netherlands) 2007 Dutch TT
Race details
- Race 9 of 18 races in the 2007 Grand Prix motorcycle racing season
- Date: 30 June 2007
- Official name: A-Style TT Assen
- Location: TT Circuit Assen
- Course: Permanent racing facility; 4.555 km (2.830 mi)

MotoGP
Pole position
- Rider: (Australia) Chris Vermeulen
- Time: 1:48.555
Fastest lap
- Rider: (Italy) Valentino Rossi
- Time: 1:37.433
Podium
- First: (Italy) Valentino Rossi
- Second: (Australia) Casey Stoner
- Third: (United States) Nicky Hayden

250cc
Pole position
- Rider: (Spain) Jorge Lorenzo
- Time: 1:39.958
Fastest lap
- Rider: (San Marino) Alex de Angelis
- Time: 1:40.354
Podium
- First: (Spain) Jorge Lorenzo
- Second: (San Marino) Alex de Angelis
- Third: (Spain) Álvaro Bautista

125cc
Pole position
- Rider: (Italy) Mattia Pasini
- Time: 1:45.603
Fastest lap
- Rider: (Spain) Héctor Faubel
- Time: 1:45.551
Podium
- First: (Italy) Mattia Pasini
- Second: (Spain) Héctor Faubel
- Third: (Hungary) Gábor Talmácsi

The 2007 Dutch TT was the ninth round of the 2007 MotoGP championship. It took place on the weekend of 28–30 June 2007 at the TT Circuit Assen in Assen, Netherlands.

== MotoGP race report ==
This race was most notable for Valentino Rossi's comeback from eleventh on the grid to win the race, beating the superior Casey Stoner-Ducati-Bridgestone combination as well.

Chris Vermeulen took pole position on Saturday - his first of the season and third and final of his career overall - followed by Casey Stoner and Randy de Puniet on the Kawasaki. On the second row of the grid is Marco Melandri, John Hopkins and Colin Edwards in fourth, fifth and sixth. Yamaha teammate Valentino Rossi started down in eleventh after a poor qualifying in the wet. Toni Elías did not take part in the race after he broke his leg in one of the free practice sessions.

Before the start of the formation lap, the Pramac Ducati bike of Alex Hofmann stalled on the grid, causing some of the crewmembers to run onto the track with equipment to restart it. The other riders take off and do their usual warm-up lap before lining up in their respective grid slots. As the lights go out, Stoner takes the lead on the opening lap as the blasts past Vermeulen into the Haarbocht (Turn 1), followed by the other Australian and the American Hopkins. Behind them, Melandri slotted into fourth and Nicky Hayden fights with Edwards for fifth place, himself moving up six places in a few corners. Rossi has moved up one position into tenth as de Puniet has made an abysmal start and dropped back to eleventh position. All throughout the field there is action, with Capirossi overtaking Rossi and Hoffmann for ninth and Hopkins taking second from Vermeulen on the straight before the Ruskenhoek (Turn 8). Rossi passes Hoffmann on the short, kinked section between the Stekkenwal (Turn 10) and De Bult (Turn 11), moving up into ninth. Hayden lines up a move on the outside of the Ramshoek (Turn 17), then taking fifth on the inside of Edwards at the beginning of the Geert Timmer Bocht (Turn 18).

Lap two begins and Stoner already has a big advantage over second place Hopkins. Pedrosa also takes sixth from Edwards on the start/finish straight. Hayden then takes fourth from Melandri at the Mandeven, going up the inside of the Gresini Honda rider.

Going into lap three and Pedrosa makes the move on Melandri for fifth at the start/finish straight. He tries to fight back, but to no avail. Capirossi closes up to Melandri, with Rossi doing the same to the Ducati rider. He tries to pass Capirossi at the start of the Geert Timmer Bocht, but isn't able to do so.

Lap four and Rossi has now finally managed to pass Capirossi, going side by side with him at the start/finish straight and into the Haarbocht, moving him up to eighth. At the Ossenbroeken, Edwards makes the move on Melandri by going side by side with him on the outside, then finalising the pass down at the inside of the Strubben hairpin, moving him up to sixth. At the front, Hayden spectacularly manages to surprise Vermeulen as they go into the Ruskenhoek, going up the inside, outbreaking him and sliding sideways into the corner, grabbing second in the process. Hopkins' gap to Stoner is now +1.299 seconds and Pedrosa takes third from the Suzuki rider at the entrance of De Bult corner. Rossi overtakes teammate Edwards for seventh at the entrance of the Geert Timmer Bocht by going up his inside.

On lap five, the gap Hopkins has to Stoner has increased - it is now +1.365 seconds. Rossi is slowly catching fourth place Vermeulen, then overtakes him by going up his inside in a surprise attack at the right-hand Mandeven turn, promoting him to sixth place.

Lap six and the gap Hopkins has to Stoner has increased again, this time being +2.507 seconds. Melandri meanwhile has lost various positions and is now behind Randy de Puniet in tenth place. Rossi is hunting down Pedrosa for fifth.

Lap seven begins and Rossi has closed the gap to Pedrosa and Hayden. He makes a move on Pedrosa coming out of the Ramshoek and entering the Geert Timmer Bocht, moving up to fourth.

On lap eight, the gap Hopkins has to Stoner has decreased massively and is now only +1.057 seconds. Going into the Mandeven, Rossi dives down the inside of Hayden and takes third position away from him. Further back, de Puniet managed to overtake Melandri and Capirossi and is now in eighth place. Edwards meanwhile went down the inside with Vermeulen for sixth at the Ossebroeken, then overtook him at the outside of the Strubben hairpin.

Lap nine and Alex Barros overtakes Melandri for ninth at the start/finish straight. However, the surprised Barros by retaking the spot at the Ossebroeken when he went a tad too wide, allowing the Italian to get back at him. Barros - making good use of the superior straight line speed - then takes the place at the Veenslang straight. Rossi is still slowly closing the gap to Hopkins.

On lap ten, the gap Rossi has to Hopkins is +1.282 seconds, which decreased to +0.889 when he arrived at sector one, then +0.763 at sector two, then +0.410 and then +0.184 when they cross the finish line.

Lap eleven begins and "The Doctor" is now all over the back of Hopkins. Exiting Strubben and coming onto the Veenslang, Rossi effortlessly took second place from a fading Hopkins, now setting his sights on Stoner at the front. Randy de Puniet meanwhile crashes out of the race after he was shadowing Vermeulen in the first half of the lap. When entering the Mandeven sequence of right hand corners, he tried to pass Vermeulen by going up his inside. He however, closed the door on him, and with the Frenchman nowhere to go, collided with the rear of Vermeulen, sending him over his bike and into the gravel at high speed. Vermeulen went straight because of the Kawasaki being stuck on his rear and not allowing him to turn, forcing him wide through the gravel. He managed to return onto the track down in sixteenth place, but de Puniet was out.

On lap twelve, the top eight consists out of Stoner, Rossi, Hopkins, Hayden, Pedrosa, Edwards (+2.703 seconds behind), Barros (+10.380 seconds behind) and Anthony West (+2.614 seconds behind). The gap Rossi has to Stoner is +1.528 seconds.

As lap thirteen starts, Rossi manages to close in on Stoner, cutting the gap from +1.528 to +0.588 seconds at the start/finish straight. The Repsol Honda of Hayden has also closed the gap to Hopkins exiting the Veenslang. Rossi then has a look up the inside of Stoner entering the Geert Timmer Bocht, but thinks the better of it and tucks in behind Stoner.

Lap fourteen and Hopkins has lost two places to both Hayden (who is now third) and Pedrosa (who is now fourth) at the start/finish straight. Pedrosa also looks to dive down the inside of his teammate, but stays behind him for now. Rossi is still all over the back of Stoner.

On lap fifteen, Rossi ran a bit wide at the Ossenbroeken, gifting Stoner some breathing room. Further back, Melandri now has a train consisting out of West, Hoffmann and Carlos Checa. The Repsol Honda duo of Hayden and Pedrosa are now creating a significant gap to Hopkins.

Lap sixteen has begun and Rossi is still right behind Stoner, looking for a way past. Pedrosa meanwhile is also all over the back of Hayden. Rossi tries again at the exit of the Ramshoek to line up a pass at the Geert Timmer Bocht, but Stoner denies him again, closing the inside.

On lap seventeen, Capirossi - who was in a lowly fifteenth position - enters the pits to retire, as he has problems with the bike. Rossi still has not been able to pass Stoner so far.

Lap eighteen begins with Edwards closing in on a now fading Hopkins. At the back, Melandri is still battling with the trio of West, Hoffmann and Checa. Makoto Tamada, riding the Dunlop Yamaha, is also under pressure from the Konica Minolta Honda of Shinya Nakano. At the front meanwhile, Rossi is still trying at the Geert Timmer Bocht, but to no avail.

On lap twenty, Hayden was pulling away from Pedrosa in fourth. Rossi is still shadowing Stoner, looking for aa way past.

Lap twenty-one and Hoffmann at the back has taken eighth place from Melandri, who is still under pressure from West and Checa. He got overtaken on the previous lap by the Stekkenwal corner.

On lap twenty-two, Hayden extends his lead over Pedrosa to +1.7 seconds. Rossi is still right behind Stoner. West has overtaken Melandri for ninth at the entrance of the Geert Timmer Bocht by going up the inside of the Italian.

Lap twenty-three and Rossi finally manages to pass Stoner for the lead. He lines up the pass coming out of the Ramshoek, staying right behind Stoner until they come up to the Geert Timmer Bocht, then outbreaks Stoner as they enter the first of the three corners to overtake him.

Lap twenty-four begins and Rossi is now in the lead. He extends his gap up to +0.637 seconds.

On lap twenty-five - the penultimate lap -, the gap Stoner has to Rossi increases, it is now +0.841 seconds.

The last lap - lap twenty-six - has begun and Rossi has increased his gap to Stoner to +1.5 seconds. Hayden has also a big gap back to Pedrosa. No overtakes happened and Rossi jubilantly cruised to the flag to win the race - his third victory of the season. Behind him Stoner finished second and Nicky Hayden in third, making it his first podium of the season. In fourth place came Pedrosa, in fifth place Hopkins and in sixth place Edwards.

On the parade lap back to parc-fermé, Rossi stopped as some of his fans celebrated with him on the track, congratulating him for the win. After the little group celebration, he continues to ride back, standing on his bike and T-posing as he continues to celebrate on his own. Barros then rides next to him to congratulate him, shaking his hand, with Checa congratulating him as well from a distance. Stoner stops on the side of the circuit, probably because he has run out of fuel, with Rossi sitting in the middle of a target at the side of the circuit as a form of celebration, posing for a marshall who takes a picture. Another marshall hands him his bike as he is done, with multiple others taking photo's on their camera's. He then stops again in front of the TT Assen logo on the ground to celebrate once more while the other riders slowly make their way back to parc-fermé. Stoner is talking to the marshalls, probably asking for a ride back as his bike has run out of fuel, with Rossi then riding back to the pits, still celebrating with the marshalls who congratulate him. As Hayden rides back, his fans clap as he waves at the Repsol Honda tribune. The public does likewise as Rossi rides back.

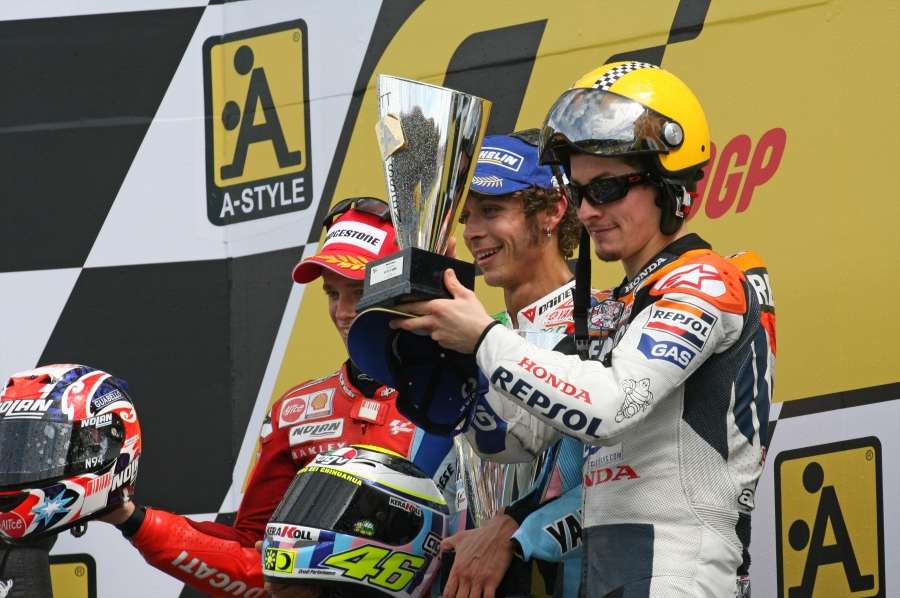
Casey Stoner, Valentino Rossi and Nicky Hayden, celebrating on the podium after finishing second, first and third at the MotoGP race.

Once back to parc-fermé, Hayden talks to and gets congratulated by his crewmembers. Rossi does as well with his clearly joyful team, hugging his crewmembers also. Stoner has now returned to parc-fermé on the back of a dirtbike as Stoner comes over to congratulate him on his win. All three riders are now talking to their teams before the podium ceremony begins. Rossi also hugs some of the Ducati members.

The trio walk up to the steps leading to the podium, the three then stepping onto the podium. The important figures hand out the trophies, with the crowd celebrating loudly as Rossi's name is mentioned. The Italian national anthem plays and then the trio sprays the champagne, with Hayden wearing an A-Style helmet as they do so.

Casey Stoner's lead has now been cut to 21 points after Rossi's win, with 185 and 164 the difference. Dani Pedrosa is a distant third with 119 points and John Hopkins fourth with 94 points.

== MotoGP classification ==
Pos.	No.	Rider	Team	Manufacturer	Laps	Time/Retired	Grid	Points
1	46	(Italy) Valentino Rossi	Fiat Yamaha Team	Yamaha	26	42:37.149	11	25
2	27	(Australia) Casey Stoner	Ducati Marlboro Team	Ducati	26	+1.909	2	20
3	1	(United States) Nicky Hayden	Repsol Honda Team	Honda	26	+6.077	13	16
4	26	(Spain) Dani Pedrosa	Repsol Honda Team	Honda	26	+10.465	9	13
5	21	(United States) John Hopkins	Rizla Suzuki MotoGP	Suzuki	26	+13.138	5	11
6	5	(United States) Colin Edwards	Fiat Yamaha Team	Yamaha	26	+15.139	6	10
7	4	(Brazil) Alex Barros	Pramac d'Antin	Ducati	26	+36.075	12	9
8	66	(Germany) Alex Hofmann	Pramac d'Antin	Ducati	26	+41.768	8	8
9	13	(Australia) Anthony West	Kawasaki Racing Team	Kawasaki	26	+43.605	7	7
10	33	(Italy) Marco Melandri	Honda Gresini	Honda	26	+43.796	4	6
11	7	(Spain) Carlos Checa	Honda LCR	Honda	26	+43.826	16	5
12	56	(Japan) Shinya Nakano	Konica Minolta Honda	Honda	26	+47.896	15	4
13	6	(Japan) Makoto Tamada	Dunlop Yamaha Tech 3	Yamaha	26	+54.068	18	3
14	50	(France) Sylvain Guintoli	Dunlop Yamaha Tech 3	Yamaha	26	+57.718	17	2
15	80	(United States) Kurtis Roberts	Team Roberts	KR212V	26	+1:28.637	14	1
16	71	(Australia) Chris Vermeulen	Rizla Suzuki MotoGP	Suzuki	26	+1:34.808	1	
Ret	65	(Italy) Loris Capirossi	Ducati Marlboro Team	Ducati	17	Retirement	10	
Ret	14	(France) Randy de Puniet	Kawasaki Racing Team	Kawasaki	11	Accident	3	
WD	24	(Spain) Toni Elías	Honda Gresini	Honda		Withdrew		

== 250 cc classification ==
Pos.	No.	Rider	Manufacturer	Laps	Time/Retired	Grid	Points
1	1	(Spain) Jorge Lorenzo	Aprilia	24	40:25.904	1	25
2	3	(San Marino) Alex de Angelis	Aprilia	24	+3.857	7	20
3	19	(Spain) Álvaro Bautista	Aprilia	24	+8.683	3	16
4	34	(Italy) Andrea Dovizioso	Honda	24	+17.948	2	13
5	4	(Japan) Hiroshi Aoyama	KTM	24	+30.800	4	11
6	58	(Italy) Marco Simoncelli	Gilera	24	+31.135	8	10
7	80	(Spain) Héctor Barberá	Aprilia	24	+33.323	5	9
8	36	(Finland) Mika Kallio	KTM	24	+40.807	10	8
9	15	(Italy) Roberto Locatelli	Gilera	24	+1:11.829	13	7
10	55	(Japan) Yuki Takahashi	Honda	24	+1:18.958	15	6
11	32	(Italy) Fabrizio Lai	Aprilia	24	+1:19.361	11	5
12	44	(Japan) Taro Sekiguchi	Aprilia	24	+1:26.810	19	4
13	73	(Japan) Shuhei Aoyama	Honda	24	+1:26.850	14	3
14	8	(Thailand) Ratthapark Wilairot	Honda	24	+1:28.717	17	2
15	17	(Czech Republic) Karel Abraham	Aprilia	24	+1:28.949	20	1
16	28	(Germany) Dirk Heidolf	Aprilia	24	+1:30.407	22	
17	41	(Spain) Aleix Espargaró	Aprilia	24	+1:33.812	12	
18	7	(Spain) Efrén Vázquez	Aprilia	24	+1:37.706	26	
19	25	(Italy) Alex Baldolini	Aprilia	24	+1:44.925	16	
20	16	(France) Jules Cluzel	Aprilia	24	+1:47.373	18	
21	50	(Republic of Ireland) Eugene Laverty	Honda	23	+1 lap	21	
22	10	(Hungary) Imre Tóth	Aprilia	23	+1 lap	25	
23	69	(Netherlands) Ronald Beitler	Honda	23	+1 lap	27	
24	68	(Netherlands) Randy Gevers	Aprilia	21	+3 laps	28	
Ret	12	(Switzerland) Thomas Lüthi	Aprilia	18	Retirement	6	
Ret	45	(United Kingdom) Dan Linfoot	Aprilia	11	Accident	23	
Ret	72	(Netherlands) Hans Smees	Aprilia	10	Retirement	24	
Ret	60	(Spain) Julián Simón	Honda	8	Retirement	9	
DNQ	70	(Netherlands) Mike Velthuijzen	Honda		Did not qualify		
OFFICIAL 250cc REPORT

== 125 cc classification ==
Pos.	No.	Rider	Manufacturer	Laps	Time/Retired	Grid	Points
1	75	(Italy) Mattia Pasini	Aprilia	22	38:58.171	1	25
2	55	(Spain) Héctor Faubel	Aprilia	22	+6.115	7	20
3	14	(Hungary) Gábor Talmácsi	Aprilia	22	+6.146	6	16
4	33	(Spain) Sergio Gadea	Aprilia	22	+6.354	4	13
5	24	(Italy) Simone Corsi	Aprilia	22	+6.454	3	11
6	71	(Japan) Tomoyoshi Koyama	KTM	22	+6.633	13	10
7	52	(Czech Republic) Lukáš Pešek	Derbi	22	+6.643	2	9
8	11	(Germany) Sandro Cortese	Aprilia	22	+17.696	5	8
9	60	(Austria) Michael Ranseder	Derbi	22	+17.890	10	7
10	17	(Germany) Stefan Bradl	Aprilia	22	+21.780	9	6
11	44	(Spain) Pol Espargaró	Aprilia	22	+22.867	17	5
12	34	(Switzerland) Randy Krummenacher	KTM	22	+22.938	25	4
13	12	(Spain) Esteve Rabat	Honda	22	+23.095	19	3
14	35	(Italy) Raffaele De Rosa	Aprilia	22	+34.247	8	2
15	8	(Italy) Lorenzo Zanetti	Aprilia	22	+36.991	14	1
16	7	(France) Alexis Masbou	Honda	22	+37.145	20	
17	18	(Spain) Nicolás Terol	Derbi	22	+37.407	12	
18	6	(Spain) Joan Olivé	Aprilia	22	+37.597	11	
19	27	(Italy) Stefano Bianco	Aprilia	22	+40.237	18	
20	29	(Italy) Andrea Iannone	Aprilia	22	+48.387	37	
21	56	(Netherlands) Hugo van den Berg	Aprilia	22	+51.244	32	
22	20	(Italy) Roberto Tamburini	Aprilia	22	+51.374	23	
23	31	(Spain) Enrique Jerez	Honda	22	+51.923	26	
24	15	(Italy) Federico Sandi	Aprilia	22	+55.947	29	
25	53	(Italy) Simone Grotzkyj	Aprilia	22	+57.183	27	
26	37	(Netherlands) Joey Litjens	Honda	22	+59.846	22	
27	51	(United States) Stevie Bonsey	KTM	22	+1:18.758	24	
28	77	(Switzerland) Dominique Aegerter	Aprilia	22	+1:19.653	28	
29	85	(Austria) Philipp Eitzinger	Honda	22	+1:29.071	36	
30	90	(Netherlands) Roy Pouw	Aprilia	21	+1 lap	31	
31	72	(Netherlands) Patrick van de Waarsenburg	Honda	21	+1 lap	34	
32	89	(Netherlands) Jasper Iwema	Honda	21	+1 lap	33	
33	88	(Netherlands) Ferry Stoffer	Honda	21	+1 lap	35	
Ret	22	(Spain) Pablo Nieto	Aprilia	19	Retirement	15	
Ret	95	(Romania) Robert Mureșan	Derbi	10	Retirement	21	
Ret	63	(France) Mike Di Meglio	Honda	10	Retirement	16	
Ret	99	(United Kingdom) Danny Webb	Honda	5	Accident	30	
WD	38	(United Kingdom) Bradley Smith	Honda		Withdrew		
OFFICIAL 125cc REPORT

== Championship standings after the race (MotoGP) ==
Below are the standings for the top five riders and constructors after round nine has concluded.

Riders' Championship standings

Pos.	Rider	Points
1	(Australia) Casey Stoner	185
2	(Italy) Valentino Rossi	164
3	(Spain) Dani Pedrosa	119
4	(United States) John Hopkins	94
5	(Australia) Chris Vermeulen	88

Constructors' Championship standings

Pos.	Constructor	Points
1	(Italy) Ducati	188
2	(Japan) Yamaha	171
3	(Japan) Honda	149
4	(Japan) Suzuki	122
5	(Japan) Kawasaki	56

- Note: Only the top five positions are included for both sets of standings.

Previous race: 2007 British Grand Prix	FIM Grand Prix World Championship; 2007 season	Next race: 2007 German Grand Prix
Previous race: 2006 Dutch TT	Dutch TT	Next race: 2008 Dutch TT
