= Daniel Arcas =

Spanish motorcycle racer (born 1990)

- Nationality: Spanish
- Born: 22 June 1990 (age 36); Barcelona, Spain

Daniel Arcas Aznar (born 22 June 1990) is a Grand Prix motorcycle racer from Barcelona, Spain.

== Career statistics ==
2008 - NC, European Superstock 600 Championship, Honda CBR600RR

=== Grand Prix motorcycle racing ===
==== By season ====
Season	Class	Motorcycle	Team	Number	Race	Win	Podium	Pole	FLap	Pts	Plcd
2008	250cc	Honda	Team Honda Merson	92	1	0	0	0	0	2	25th
2008	250cc	Aprilia	Blusens Aprilia	92	4	0	0	0	0	2	25th
2009	250cc	Aprilia	Milar - Juegos Lucky	37	1	0	0	0	0	0	NC
Total					**6**	**0**	**0**	**0**	**0**	**2**	

==== Races by year ====
(key)

Year	Class	Bike	1	2	3	4	5	6	7	8	9	10	11	12	13	14	15	16	17	Pos.	Pts
2008	250cc	Aprilia	QAT	SPA	POR	CHN	FRA	ITA	CAT; Ret	GBR	NED	GER	CZE	RSM	INP	JPN; 20	AUS; 16	MAL; 17	VAL; 14	25th	2
2009	250cc	Aprilia	QAT	JPN	SPA	FRA	ITA; 20	CAT	NED	GER	GBR	CZE	INP	RSM	POR	AUS	MAL	VAL		NC	0

=== European Superstock 600 ===
==== Races by year ====
(key) (Races in bold indicate pole position, races in italics indicate fastest lap)

Year	Bike	1	2	3	4	5	6	7	8	9	10	Pos	Pts
2008	Honda	VAL; DSQ	ASS	MNZ	NÜR	MIS	BRN	BRA	DON	MAG	POR	NC	0
