= Yamaha PW50 =

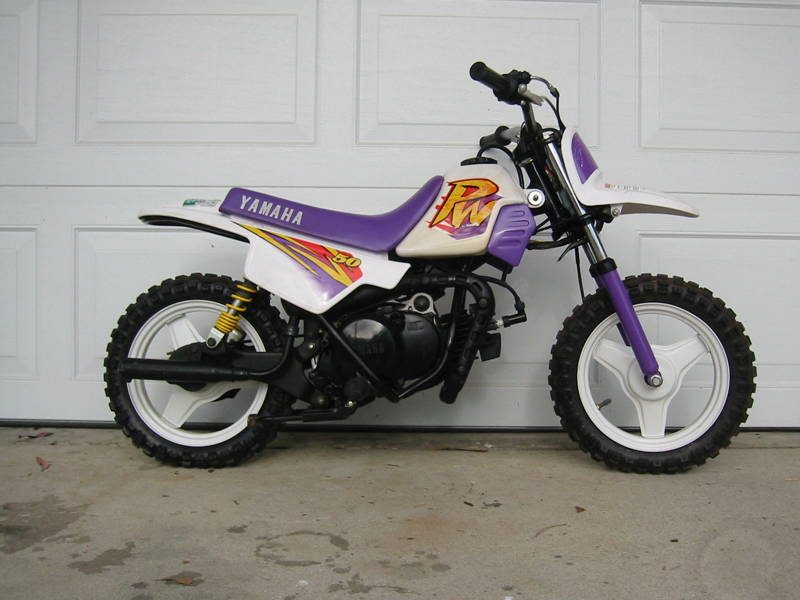
- Manufacturer: Yamaha
- Production: 1980–present
- Class: 50cc minibke
- Engine: 49 cc (3.0 cu in), single-cylinder, 2-stroke
- Bore / stroke: 40 mm × 39.2 mm (1.57 in × 1.54 in)
- Power: 2.5–2.7 bhp (1.9–2.0 kW) @ 2700 rpm
- Torque: 2.6–2.8 lb⋅ft (3.5–3.8 N⋅m)
- Transmission: single-speed, wet centrifugal clutch automatic, shaft drive
- Suspension: 22.5mm telescopic fork (front); Unit swingarm (rear)
- Brakes: Drum brakes all-round
- Wheelbase: 33.7 in (860 mm)
- Dimensions: L: 49 in (1,200 mm); W: 22.6–24 in (570–610 mm); H: 27.8 in (710 mm)
- Weight: 37 kg (82 lb) (dry)
- Fuel capacity: 0.5 US gal (1.9 L)

The Yamaha PW50 is a commercially available two-stroke 50 cc (3.1 cu in) mini dirt bike, designed, developed and produced by Japanese manufacturer Yamaha since 1980.
