= Suzuki GSX-R600 =

Sports motorcycle

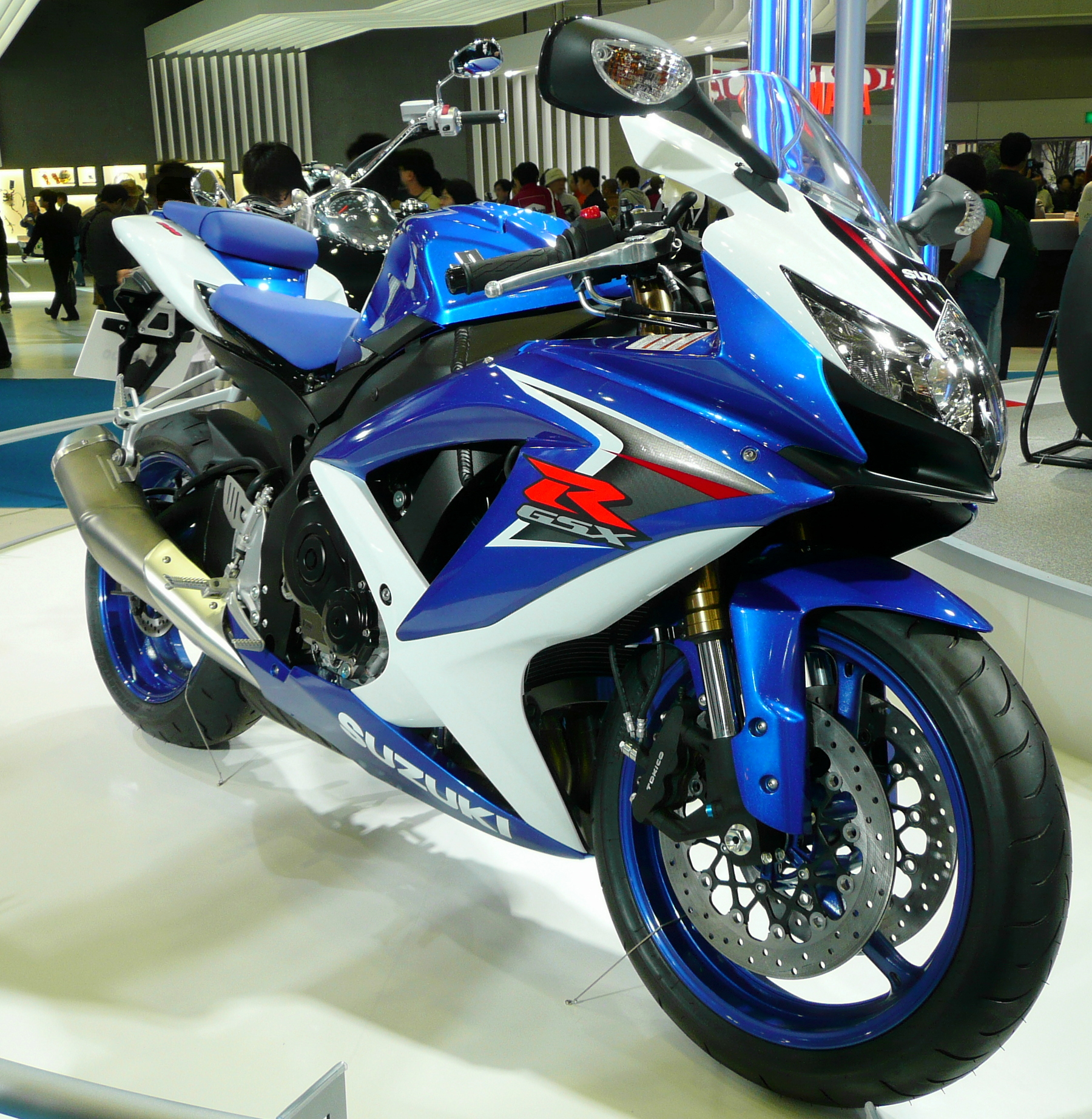
- 2008 Suzuki GSX-R600
- Manufacturer: Suzuki
- Production: 1991—1992, 1996—present
- Class: Sport
- Engine: 599 cc, 4-stroke, liquid-cooled, DOHC, 4 valves per cylinder, Transverse 4
- Related: Suzuki GSX-R750; Suzuki GSX-R1000

The Suzuki GSX-R600 is a 599 cc sports motorcycle in Suzuki's GSX-R series of motorcycles.

== History ==
1992–1993

Launched with a water-cooled 599 cc (36.6 cu in) inline-4 engine. The first model had the same body specifications as the 1992 GSX-R750, with the smaller engine and carried over through to the 1993 model year with no changes. It was not imported to UK.

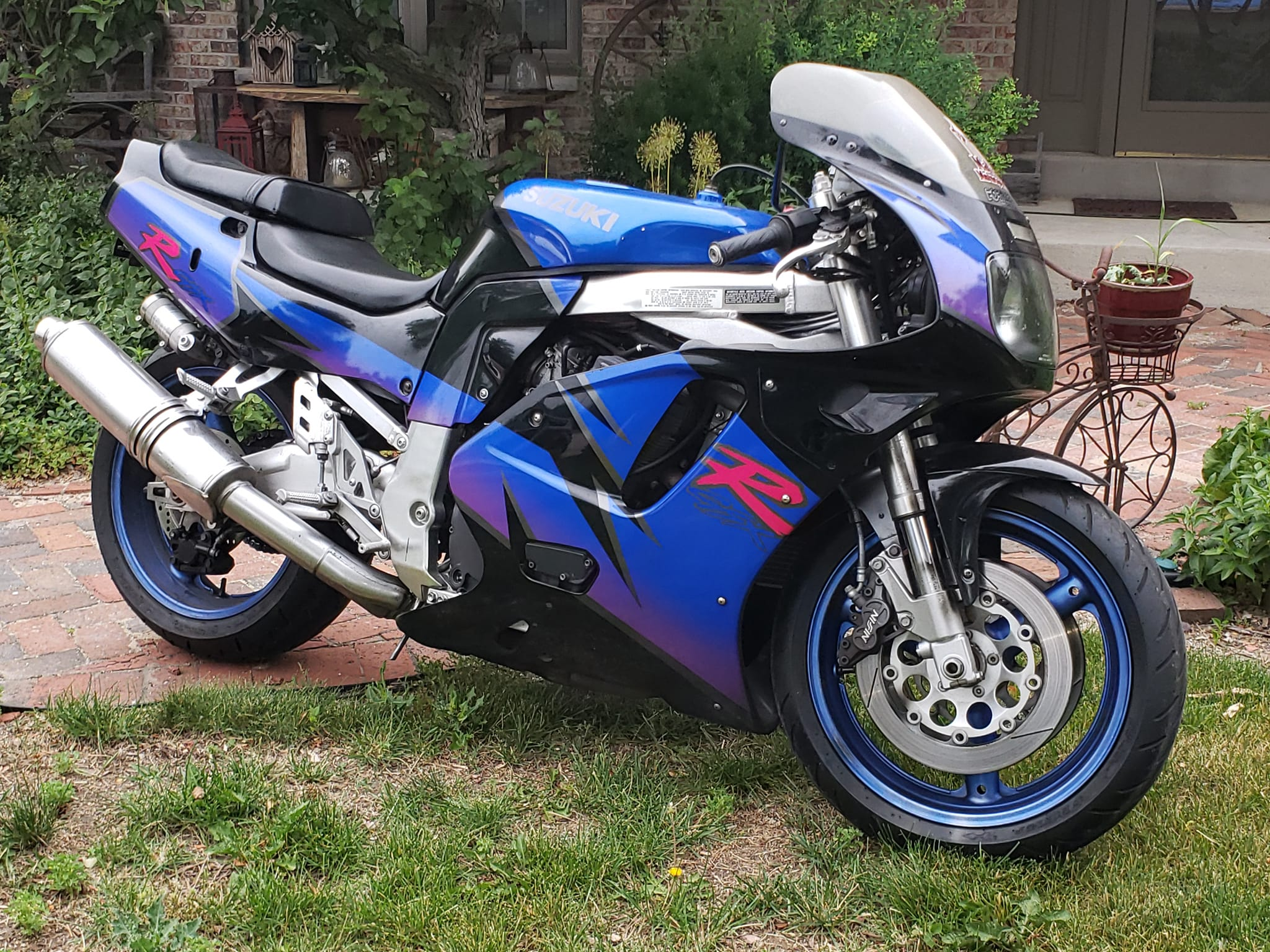
1992 Suzuki GSXR-600

1994–1996

Not produced.

1997–2000

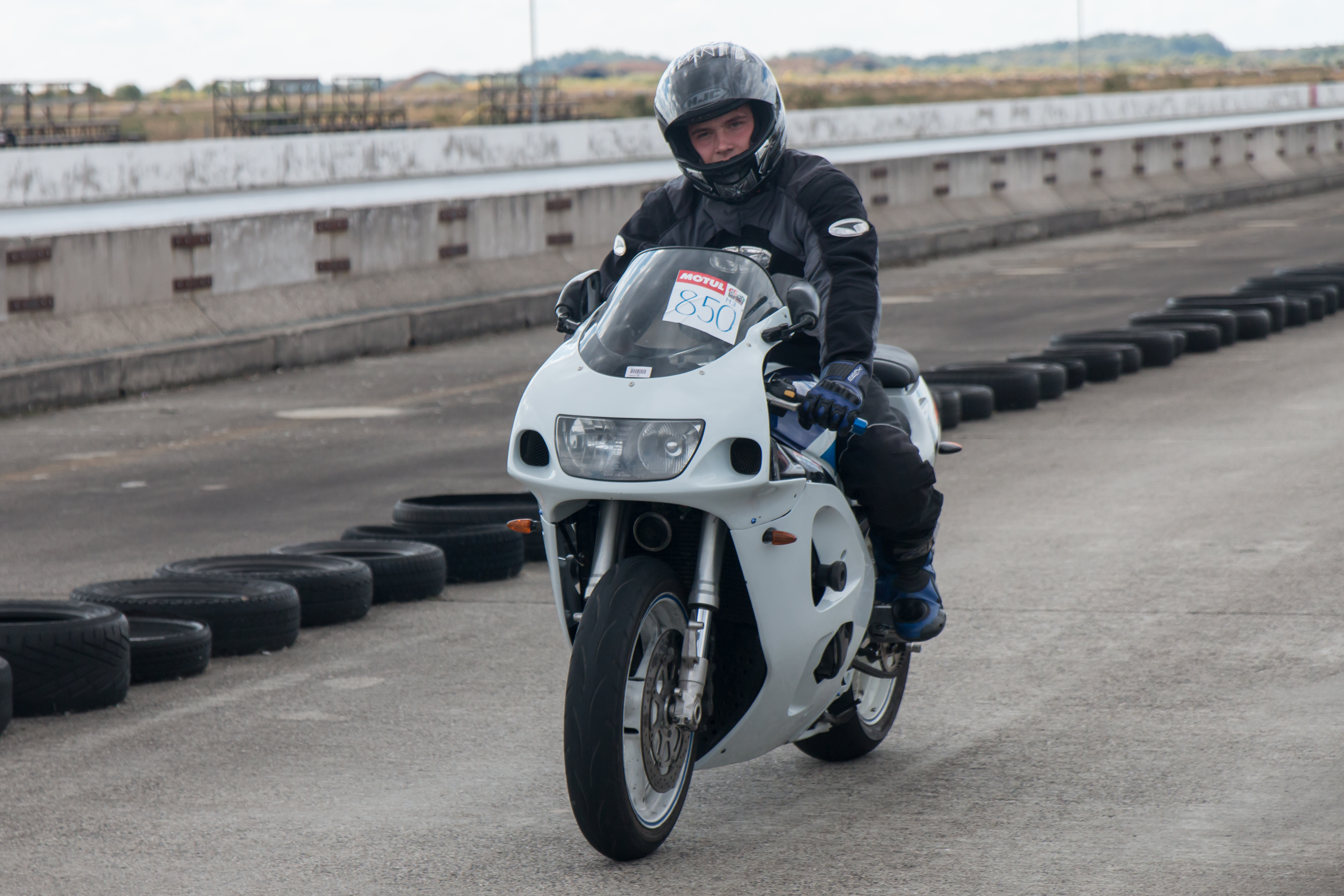
1997–2000 Suzuki GSX-R600

Redesigned with the introduction of Suzuki Ram Air Direct (SRAD) and carried over through to the 2000 model year.

2001–2003

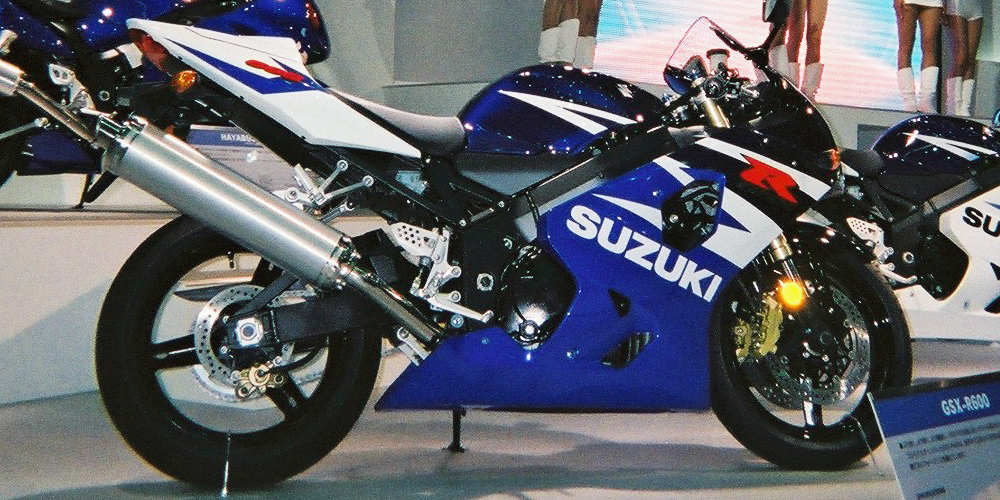
2004 Suzuki GSX-R 600

First year introducing the all-new fuel injection system along with the 2003 model having an integrated choke, but still being fuel injected.

2003 introducing the limited edition "alstare" racing graphics, 1500 made, mostly in Germany.

2004–2005

Redesigned which carried over through to the 2005 model year. Total redesign of the fairings and fuel tank. Inverted forks with radial-mounted brakes. Titanium valves, 32-bit ECU were some of the changes on the engine side.

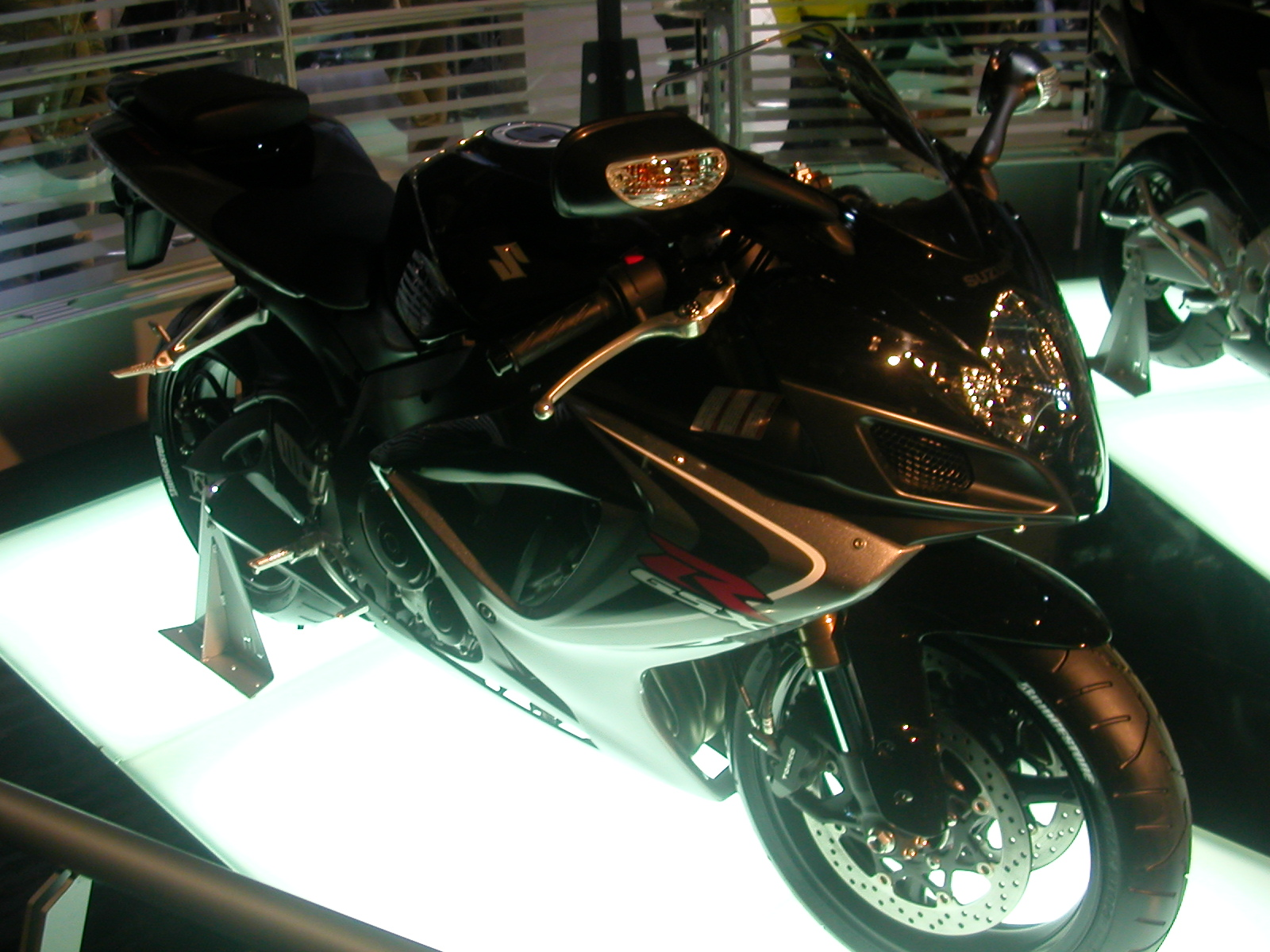
2006 Suzuki GSX-R 600

2006–2007

Suzuki introduced an all-new GSX-R600. Underslung exhaust and slipper clutch introduced. Engine is completely new, but with the same bore and stroke as before.

2008–2010

New subframe, bodywork, and fuel tank. Introduction of new Suzuki Drive Mode Selector (S-DMS).

2011–present

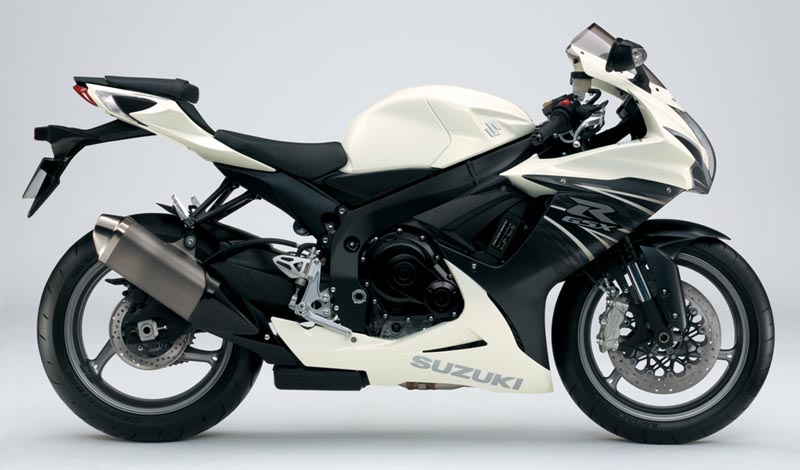
2011 Suzuki GSX-R600

The motorcycle is 9 kg lighter overall and features Showa Big Piston Forks (BPF), Brembo monobloc radial front brake calipers, re-designed lighter frame and swingarm, and a 15 mm shorter wheelbase. It has a new gauge cluster similar to that used on the GSX-R1000. It also has new cams, lighter pistons, higher compression and pentagonal ventilation holes on the block increases mid-range torque.

== Specifications ==
	1992–1993	1997–2000	2001–2003	2004–2005	2006	2007	2008	2009–2010	2011–2013	2014	2015–2017
Engine	600 cc (37 cu in)		599 cc (36.6 cu in), 4-stroke, inline four, liquid-cooled, DOHC, 16-valve								
Bore × stroke	65.0 mm × 45.2 mm (2.56 in × 1.78 in)	65.5 mm × 44.5 mm (2.58 in × 1.75 in)	67.0 mm × 42.5 mm (2.64 in × 1.67 in)								
Compression ratio		12.0:1		12.5:1			12.8:1		12.9:1		12.8:1
Power (rear wheel)	80 hp (60 kW) @ 12,000 rpm	91.4–93.1 hp (68.2–69.4 kW)	100.6 hp (75.0 kW)	118.29 hp (88.21 kW)	125 hp (93 kW) @ 13,330 rpm	125 hp (93 kW)	125 hp (93 kW) @ 13,100 rpm		125 hp (93 kW) @ 13,550 rpm		125 hp (93 kW) @ 13,500 rpm
Torque (rear wheel)	38.7 lb⋅ft (52.5 N⋅m) @ 9,250 rpm				59.13 N⋅m (43.61 lb⋅ft) @ 11,140 rpm		63.3 N⋅m (46.7 lb⋅ft) @ 11,300 rpm		60.5 N⋅m (44.6 lb⋅ft) @ 11,700 rpm		67.7 N⋅m (49.9 lb⋅ft) @ 11,500 rpm
Fuel system		Carburetor	Fuel injection								
Lubrication		Wet sump									
Ignition		CDI		Digital/transistorized							
Transmission		6-speed constant mesh									
Clutch		Wet multi-plate type			Slipper						
Final drive		2.812		#525 chain, 2.685 (Ratio)							
Length		2,065 mm (81.3 in)		2,055 mm (80.9 in)	2,040 mm (80 in)						2,030 mm (80 in)
Width		720 mm (28 in)		715 mm (28.1 in)					710 mm (28 in)		715 mm (28.1 in)
Height		1,135 mm (44.7 in)		1,150 mm (45 in)	1,135 mm (44.7 in)	1,125 mm (44.3 in)					1,135 mm (44.7 in)
Seat height		830 mm (33 in)		825 mm (32.5 in)	810 mm (32 in)						
Ground clearance		130 mm (5.1 in)		135 mm (5.3 in)	130 mm (5.1 in)						
Wheelbase	1,440 mm (57 in)	1,390 mm (55 in)		1,400 mm (55 in)					1,385 mm (54.5 in)		
Dry weight		174 kg (384 lb)		160 kg (350 lb)	161 kg (355 lb)		163 kg (359 lb)			160 kg (352 lb)	
Wet weight	235 kg (518 lb)	200 kg (440 lb)	192 kg (423 lb)				192 kg (424 lb)		187 kg (412 lb)		
Front suspension		Telescopic		Cartridge-type, coil spring, fully adjustable spring preload, rebound and compression damping					Showa 41 mm big piston forks		
Rear suspension		Cartridge-type		Link-type, gas/oil damped, fully adjustable spring preload, compression and rebound damping. Hi & low speed adjustment							
Front brakes		Dual hydraulic disc					2 radial 310 mm (12 in) disc, 4-piston calipers		Double 310 mm (12 in) disc. Brembo 4-piston		
Rear brakes		Single hydraulic disc					1-piston caliper, 220 mm (8.7 in) disc		Single Nissin, 220 mm (8.7 in) 2-piston caliper disc		
Front tires		120/70-ZR-17									
Rear tires		180/55-ZR-17									
Fuel tank capacity	20 L (4.4 imp gal; 5.3 US gal)	18 L (4.0 imp gal; 4.8 US gal)		17 L (3.7 imp gal; 4.5 US gal)		16.5 L (3.6 imp gal; 4.4 US gal)	17 L (3.7 imp gal; 4.5 US gal)				
MSRP (U.S.)							$9,399	$10,399	$11,599	$11,699	$11,199
Performance
0 to 60 mph (0 to 97 km/h)	-	3.5 sec	3.2 sec	3.2 sec	3.1 sec	3.1 sec	3.1 sec	3.1 sec	3.3 sec	3.5 sec	3.5 sec
0 to 1/4 mi (0.00 to 0.40 km)					10.75 sec @ 208.27 km/h (129.41 mph)						11.1 sec
Top speed	253 km/h (157 mph)	240 km/h (150 mph)	261 km/h (162 mph)	264 km/h (164 mph)	253 km/h (157 mph)	264 km/h (164 mph)	264 km/h (164 mph)	259 km/h (161 mph)	259 km/h (161 mph)	259 km/h (161 mph)	253 km/h (157 mph)
Fuel economy					6.52 L/100 km; 43.4 mpg_{‑imp} (36.1 mpg_{‑US})		6.57 L/100 km; 43.0 mpg_{‑imp} (35.8 mpg_{‑US})			5.43 L/100 km; 52.0 mpg_{‑imp} (43.3 mpg_{‑US})	
Common Reference Name		SRAD	K1, K2, K3	K4, K5	K6	K7	K8	K9, L0	L1, L2, L3,	L4	L5, L6, L7
