= Alessandro Nocco =

Italian motorcycle racer

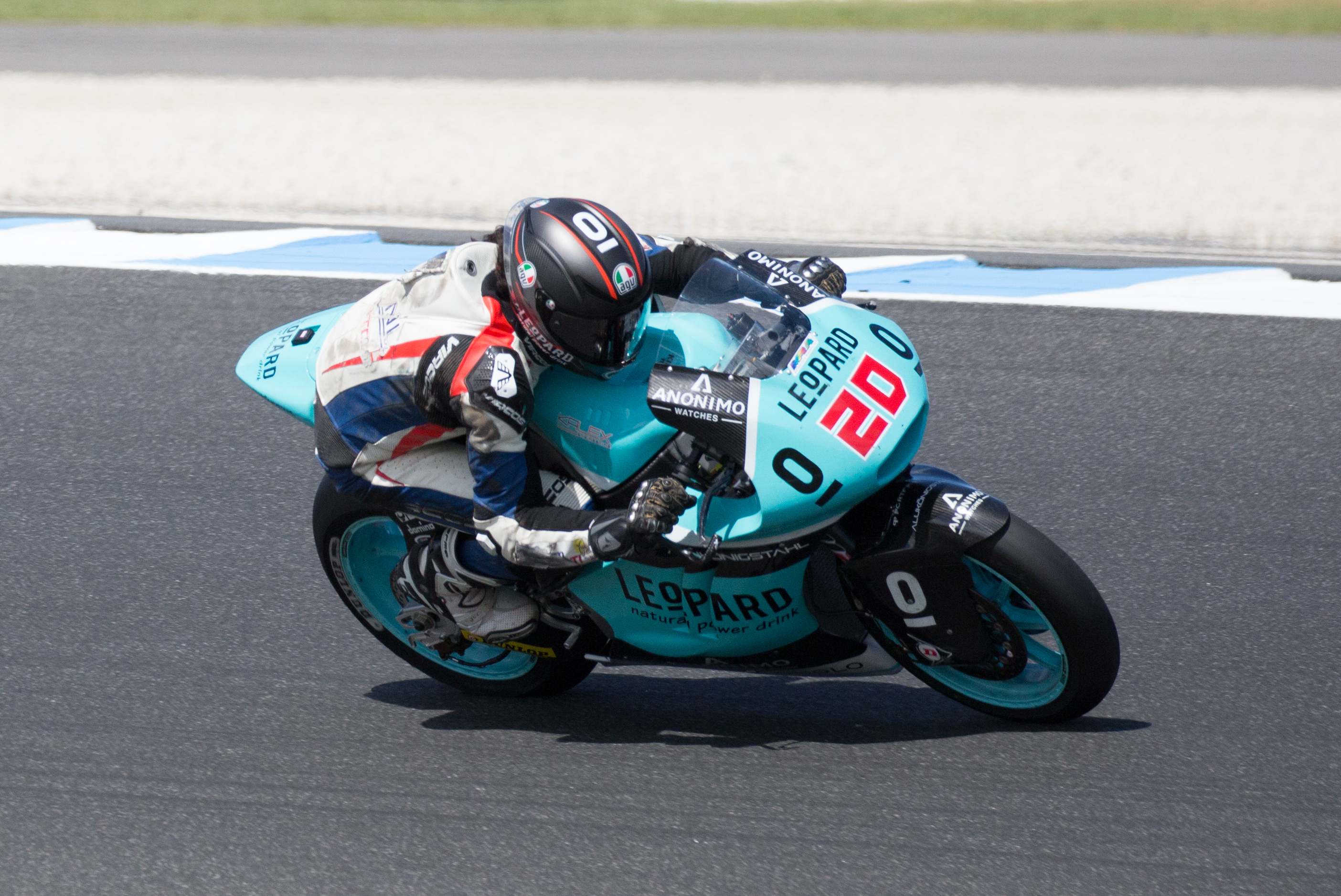
- Nocco at the 2016 Australian Grand Prix
- Nationality: Italian
- Born: 20 May 1997 (age 29); Gagliano del Capo, Italy
- Current team: Team Velocisti
- Bike number: 8
Motorcycle racing career statistics
Moto2 World Championship
Active years	2016
Manufacturers	Kalex
2016 championship position	NC (0 pts)
Starts / Wins / Podiums / Poles / F. laps / Points; 2 / 0 / 0 / 0 / 0 / 0
Supersport World Championship
Active years	2014–2015
Manufacturers	Kawasaki, Honda
2015 championship position	NC (0 pts)
Starts / Wins / Podiums / Poles / F. laps / Points; 9 / 0 / 0 / 0 / 0 / 27

Alessandro Nocco (born 20 May 1997) is an Italian motorcycle racer. He currently competes in the CIV Supersport 600 Championship aboard a Kawasaki ZX-6R. In 2011, he won the Winter Trophy held at the Autodromo del Levante in the 600 Open class, and in 2014 he was awarded the "Gemme Dello Sport" (Sports Gems) Award.

At international level, Nocco has competed in the European Superstock 600 Championship, where he was the runner-up in 2013, the Supersport World Championship, the European Superstock 1000 Championship and the Moto2 World Championship.

== Career statistics ==
=== FIM European Superstock 600 ===
==== Races by year ====
(key) (Races in bold indicate pole position, races in italics indicate fastest lap)

Year	Bike	1	2	3	4	5	6	7	8	9	10	Pos	Pts
2012	Kawasaki	IMO	ASS	MNZ	MIS	ARA	BRN	SIL	NÜR	POR	MAG; Ret	NC	0
2013	Kawasaki	ARA; 16	ASS; 12	MNZ; 5	POR; 6	IMO; 1	**SIL1**; 1	**SIL2**; 23	NÜR; 2	**MAG**; 1	JER; 3	2nd	136

=== Superstock 1000 Cup ===
==== Races by year ====
(key) (Races in bold indicate pole position) (Races in italics indicate fastest lap)

Year	Bike	1	2	3	4	5	6	7	8	Pos	Pts
2016	Kawasaki/Aprilia	ARA	NED	IMO	DON	MIS; 22	LAU	MAG; 12	JER; 10	24th	10

=== European Superstock 1000 Championship ===
==== Races by year ====
(key) (Races in bold indicate pole position) (Races in italics indicate fastest lap)

Year	Bike	1	2	3	4	5	6	7	8	9	Pos	Pts
2017	Kawasaki	ARA; DNS	NED; Ret	IMO; Ret	DON; DNS	MIS	LAU	ALG	MAG	JER	NC	0

=== Supersport World Championship ===
==== Races by year ====
Year	Bike	1	2	3	4	5	6	7	8	9	10	11	12	Pos.	Pts
2014	Kawasaki	AUS	SPA; Ret	NED; 18	ITA; 10	GBR; 14	MAL; 13	ITA; 11	POR; 12	SPA; 9	FRA; Ret	QAT		14th	27
2015	Honda	AUS	THA; DNS	SPA	NED	ITA; DNS	GBR	POR	ITA	MAL	SPA	FRA	QAT	NC	0

=== Grand Prix motorcycle racing ===
==== By season ====
Season	Class	Motorcycle	Team	Race	Win	Podium	Pole	FLap	Pts	Plcd
2016	Moto2	Kalex	Leopard Racing	2	0	0	0	0	0	NC
Total				**2**	**0**	**0**	**0**	**0**	**0**	

==== Races by year ====
Year	Class	Bike	1	2	3	4	5	6	7	8	9	10	11	12	13	14	15	16	17	18	Pos.	Pts
2016	Moto2	Kalex	QAT	ARG	AME	SPA	FRA	ITA	CAT	NED	GER	AUT	CZE	GBR	RSM	ARA	JPN	AUS; Ret	MAL; Ret	VAL	NC	0
