= Mike Jones (motorcyclist) =

Australian motorcycle racer (born 1994)

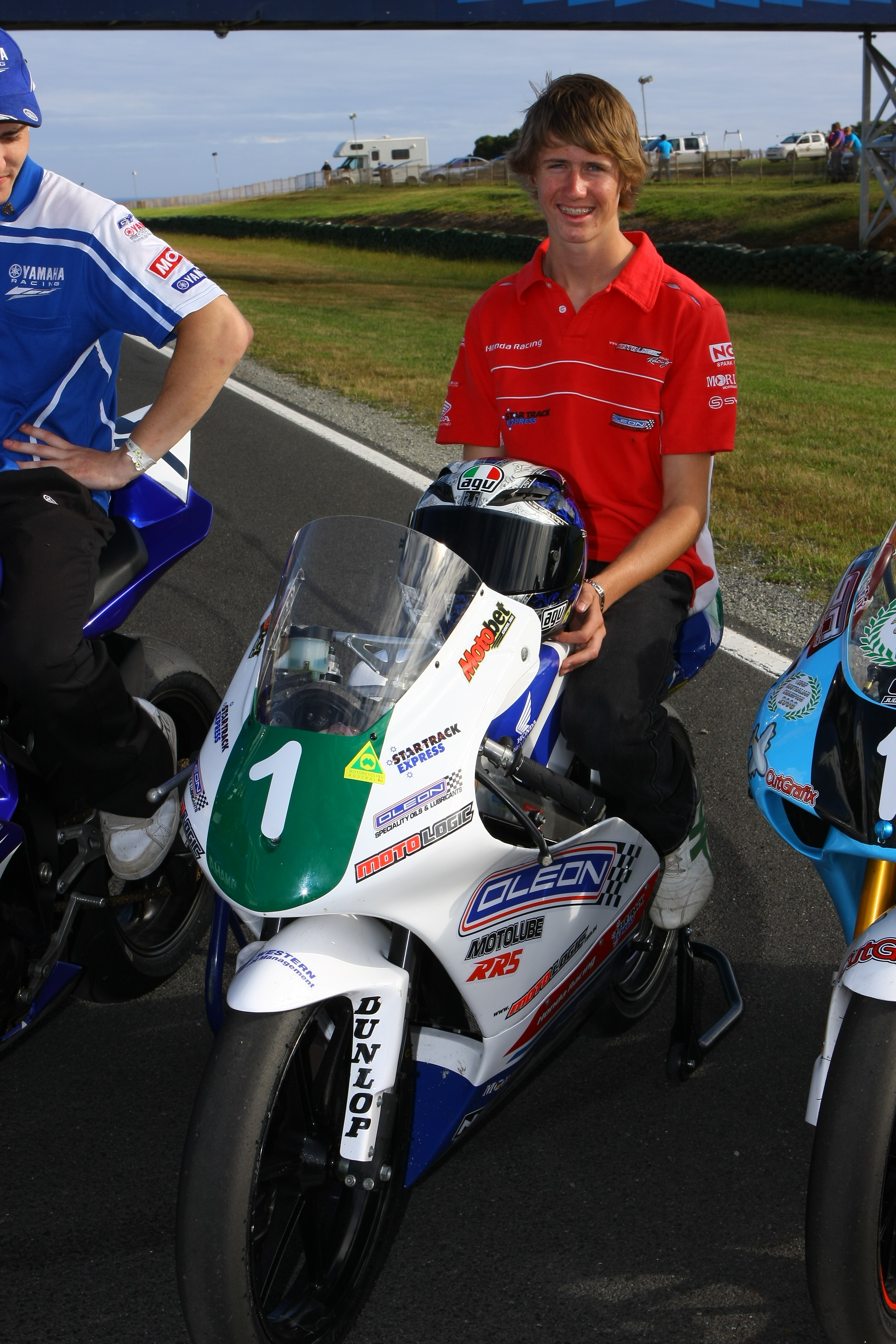
- Jones in 2009
- Nationality: Australian
- Born: Michael Edward Jones; 25 February 1994 (age 32); Brisbane, Queensland, Australia
- Current team: Yamaha Racing Team
- Bike number: 46
Motorcycle racing career statistics
MotoGP World Championship
Active years	2016, 2018
Manufacturers	Ducati
2016 championship position	27th (1 pt)
Starts / Wins / Podiums / Poles / F. laps / Points; 3 / 0 / 0 / 0 / 0 / 1
Superbike World Championship
Active years	2016
Manufacturers	Ducati
2016 championship position	30th (2 pts)
Starts / Wins / Podiums / Poles / F. laps / Points; 2 / 0 / 0 / 0 / 0 / 2

Michael Edward Jones (born 25 February 1994) is an Australian motorcycle racer. He currently competes in the Australian Superbike Championship for Yamaha Racing Team aboard a Yamaha YZF-R1. He was Australian Superbike Champion in 2015 and 2019 aboard the Ducati 1299 Panigale R Final Edition and 2022 racing the Yamaha YZF-R1. He is the first ever rider to win three Australian Superbike Championships on three different manufacturers.

2025 will be Jones' ninth year competing full time in the Australian Superbike Championship.

== Career statistics ==
=== Career highlights ===
2012 - 25th, European Superstock 600 Championship, Yamaha YZF-R6
2013 - 28th, European Superstock 600 Championship, Honda CBR600RR
2015 - 1st, Australian Superbike Championship, Kawasaki ZX-10R
2017 - 6th, European Superstock 1000 Championship, Ducati 1199 Panigale
2018 - 4th, ESBK Superstock 1000 Championship, Kawasaki ZX-10R
2019 - 1st, Australian Superbike Championship, Ducati 1299
2020 - 7th, Australian Superbike Championship, Ducati Panigale V4R
2021 - 9th, Australian Superbike Championship, Ducati Panigale V4R
2022 - 1st, Australian Superbike Championship, Yamaha YZF-R1
2023 - 5th, Australian Superbike Championship, Yamaha YZF-R1
2024 - 2nd, Australian Superbike Championship, Yamaha YZF-R1

=== European Superstock 600 ===
==== Races by year ====
(key) (Races in bold indicate pole position, races in italics indicate fastest lap)

Year	Bike	1	2	3	4	5	6	7	8	9	10	Pos	Pts
2012	Yamaha	IMO	ASS	MNZ	MIS	ARA	BRN	SIL; 6	NÜR; 16	POR	MAG	25th	10
2013	Honda	ARA; 15	ASS; 18	MNZ; 24	POR; 10	IMO; Ret	SIL1; 15	SIL2; 20	NÜR	MAG	JER	28th	8

=== Superbike World Championship ===
==== Races by year ====
Year	Make	1		2		3		4		5		6		7		8		9		10		11		12		13		Pos.	Pts
Year	Make	R1	R2	R1	R2	R1	R2	R1	R2	R1	R2	R1	R2	R1	R2	R1	R2	R1	R2	R1	R2	R1	R2	R1	R2	R1	R2	Pos.	Pts
2016	Ducati	AUS; 14	AUS; Ret	THA	THA	SPA	SPA	NED	NED	ITA	ITA	MAL	MAL	GBR	GBR	ITA	ITA	USA	USA	GER	GER	FRA	FRA	SPA	SPA	QAT	QAT	30th	2

=== European Superstock 1000 Championship ===
==== Races by year ====
(key) (Races in bold indicate pole position) (Races in italics indicate fastest lap)

Year	Bike	1	2	3	4	5	6	7	8	9	Pos	Pts
2017	Ducati	ARA; 9	NED; DNS	IMO; 7	DON; 10	MIS; 8	LAU; 2	ALG; 4	MAG; 6	JER; 4	6th	86

=== Grand Prix motorcycle racing ===
==== By season ====
Season	Class	Motorcycle	Team	Race	Win	Podium	Pole	FLap	Pts	Plcd
2016	MotoGP	Ducati	Avintia Racing	2	0	0	0	0	1	27th
2018	MotoGP	Ducati	Ángel Nieto Team	1	0	0	0	0	0	30th
Total				**3**	**0**	**0**	**0**	**0**	**1**	

==== Races by year ====
Year	Class	Bike	1	2	3	4	5	6	7	8	9	10	11	12	13	14	15	16	17	18	19	Pos.	Pts
2016	MotoGP	Ducati	QAT	ARG	AME	SPA	FRA	ITA	CAT	NED	GER	AUT	CZE	GBR	RSM	ARA	JPN; 18	AUS; 15	MAL	VAL		27th	1
2018	MotoGP	Ducati	QAT	ARG	AME	SPA	FRA	ITA	CAT	NED	GER	CZE	AUT	GBR	RSM	ARA	THA	JPN	AUS; 18	MAL	VAL	30th	0

=== Australian Superbike Championship ===
==== Races by year ====
(key) (Races in bold indicate pole position; races in italics indicate fastest lap)

Year	Bike	1		2		3		4			5		6			7		Pos	Pts
Year	Bike	R1	R2	R1	R2	R1	R2	R1	R2	R3	R1	R2	R1	R2	R3	R1	R2	Pos	Pts
2022	Yamaha	PHI; 3	PHI; 4	QUE; 1**^{1}**	QUE; 1	WAK; 1**^{1}**	WAK; 2	HID; 1	HID; 2	HID; 1	MOR; 2	MOR; 2	PHI; 10	PHI; 5	PHI; 3	BEN; 6**^{1}**	BEN; 1	1st	328

== FIM Intercontinental Games results ==
Year	Venue	Class	Team	Bike	No	Rider	Race		Points	TC
Year	Venue	Class	Team	Bike	No	Rider	R1	R2	Points	TC
2024	City of Jerez	SS	FIM Oceania	Yamaha YZF-R7	46	(Australia) Mike Jones	5	2	90	4th
2024	City of Jerez	SS	FIM Oceania	Yamaha YZF-R7	47	(Australia) Tom Toparis	7	7	90	4th
2024	City of Jerez	SS	FIM Oceania	Yamaha YZF-R7	48	(Australia) Tayla Relph	Ret	14	90	4th
2024	City of Jerez	SS	FIM Oceania	Yamaha YZF-R7	49	(Australia) Max Stauffer	DNS	DNS	90	4th
