= Hugo Clere =

French motorcycle racer

- Nationality: French
- Born: 11 June 1994 (age 32); Bourg-en-Bresse, France
- Current team: Tati Team Ava6 Racing
- Bike number: 4
Motorcycle racing career statistics
Moto2 World Championship
Active years	2016
Manufacturers	TransFIORmers
2016 championship position	NC (0 pts)
Starts / Wins / Podiums / Poles / F. laps / Points; 1 / 0 / 0 / 0 / 0 / 0

Hugo Clere (born 11 June 1994) is a French motorcycle racer, currently competing in the FIM Endurance World Championship for Tati Team Ava6 Racing, alongside teammates Mike Di Meglio and Isaac Viñales. He has competed in the European Superstock 600 Championship and French Supersport Championships, where he was champion in 2016. Also in 2016, Clere received a wild-card entry to the season closing Valencia Grand Prix in Moto2, but did not finish the race. In 2022, he rode for Team 18 Sapeurs Pompiers in the superstock category of the FIM Endurance World Championship.

== Career statistics ==
2012 - NC, European Superstock 600 Championship, Yamaha YZF-R6
2013 - 27th, European Superstock 600 Championship, Yamaha YZF-R6
2014 - 22nd, European Superstock 600 Championship #17 Yamaha YZF-R6
2015 - 10th, European Superstock 600 Championship #11 Yamaha YZF-R6

=== European Superstock 600 ===
==== Races by year ====
(key) (Races in bold indicate pole position, races in italics indicate fastest lap)

Year	Bike	1	2	3	4	5	6	7	8	9	10	Pos	Pts
2012	Yamaha	IMO	ASS	MNZ	MIS	ARA	BRN	SIL; DNS	NÜR	POR	MAG; 16	NC	0
2013	Yamaha	ARA	ASS	MNZ	POR	IMO	SIL1	SIL2	NÜR	MAG; 9	JER; 15	27th	8
2014	Yamaha	SPA	NED	IMO	ITA	POR	SPA	FRA; 5				22nd	11
2015	Yamaha	SPA; 21	SPA; Ret	NED; 4	ITA; DNS	POR; 11	ITA; 11	SPA; 10	FRA; 6			10th	39

=== Grand Prix motorcycle racing ===
==== By season ====
Season	Class	Motorcycle	Team	Race	Win	Podium	Pole	FLap	Pts	Plcd
2016	Moto2	TransFIORmers	Promoto Sport	1	0	0	0	0	0	NC
Total				**1**	**0**	**0**	**0**	**0**	**0**	

==== Races by year ====
Year	Class	Bike	1	2	3	4	5	6	7	8	9	10	11	12	13	14	15	16	17	18	Pos.	Pts
2016	Moto2	TransFIORmers	QAT	ARG	AME	SPA	FRA	ITA	CAT	NED	GER	AUT	CZE	GBR	RSM	ARA	JPN	AUS	MAL	VAL; Ret	NC	0

=== Suzuka 8 Hours ===
Year	Class	Team	Co-riders	Bike	Pos
2025	**EWC**	(France) Tati Team AVA6 Racing	(Japan) Sho Nishimura (Spain) Isaac Viñales	Honda CBR1000RR	Ret
2026	**EWC**	(France) Tati Team AVA6 Racing	(France) Mike Di Meglio (Spain) Isaac Viñales	Honda CBR1000RR	TBD
