= Bastien Chesaux =

Swiss former motorcycle racer

- Nationality: Swiss
- Born: 2 November 1991 (age 35); Lausanne, Switzerland
Motorcycle racing career statistics
250cc World Championship
Active years	2009
Manufacturers	Honda, Aprilia
Starts / Wins / Podiums / Poles / F. laps / Points; 16 / 0 / 0 / 0 / 0 / 3
125cc World Championship
Active years	2008
Manufacturers	Aprilia
Starts / Wins / Podiums / Poles / F. laps / Points; 8 / 0 / 0 / 0 / 0 / 0
Supersport World Championship
Active years	2010–2011
Manufacturers	Honda
Starts / Wins / Podiums / Poles / F. laps / Points; 18 / 0 / 0 / 0 / 0 / 14

Bastien Chesaux (born 2 November 1991) is a Swiss former motorcycle racer. He competed in the 125cc World Championship, the 250cc World Championship, the Supersport World Championship and the European Superstock 600 Championship. He retired from racing in 2015.

== Career statistics ==
2012 - 10th, European Superstock 600 Championship, Honda CBR600RR
2013 - 4th, European Superstock 600 Championship #8 Honda CBR600RR

=== Grand Prix motorcycle racing ===
==== By season ====
Season	Class	Motorcycle	Team	Race	Win	Podium	Pole	FLap	Pts	Plcd
2008	125cc	Aprilia	S3+ WTR San Marino Team; WTR San Marino Team	8	0	0	0	0	0	NC
2009	250cc	Honda	Racing Team Germany	16	0	0	0	0	3	25th
2009	250cc	Aprilia	Matteoni Racing	16	0	0	0	0	3	25th
Total				**24**	**0**	**0**	**0**	**0**	**3**	

==== Races by year ====
(key)

Year	Class	Bike	1	2	3	4	5	6	7	8	9	10	11	12	13	14	15	16	17	Pos.	Pts
2008	125cc	Aprilia	QAT	SPA	POR	CHN	FRA	ITA	CAT	GBR	NED	GER; Ret	CZE; 28	RSM; 22	INP; 23	JPN; Ret	AUS; Ret	MAL; 21	VAL; 22	NC	0
2009	250cc	Honda	QAT; 16	JPN; 16	SPA; 17	FRA; Ret	ITA; 18	CAT; 19	NED; Ret	GER; 15	GBR; 22	CZE; Ret	INP; Ret	RSM; Ret						25th	3
2009	250cc	Aprilia													POR; 17	AUS; 17	MAL; 14	VAL; 16		25th	3

=== European Superstock 600 ===
==== Races by year ====
(key) (Races in bold indicate pole position, races in italics indicate fastest lap)

Year	Bike	1	2	3	4	5	6	7	8	9	10	Pos	Pts
2012	Honda	IMO; 6	ASS; 25	MNZ; 3	MIS; Ret	ARA; Ret	BRN	SIL; 5	NÜR; 4	POR; Ret	MAG; 7	10th	59
2013	Honda	ARA; 3	ASS; 3	MNZ; 8	POR; 3	IMO; 8	SIL1; 3	SIL2; 2	NÜR; 18	MAG; 4	JER; 4	4th	129

=== Supersport World Championship ===
==== Races by year ====
(key)

Year	Bike	1	2	3	4	5	6	7	8	9	10	11	12	13	Pos.	Pts
2010	Honda	AUS	POR; 14	SPA; Ret	NED; 14	ITA; 15	RSA; 14	USA; 17	SMR; 15	CZE; Ret	GBR; 16	GER; Ret	ITA; DNS	FRA	24th	8
2011	Honda	AUS; 13	EUR; Ret	NED; 13	ITA	SMR	SPA	CZE	GBR; 20	GER; Ret	ITA; Ret	FRA; Ret	POR; 16		26th	6
