= 2016 Moto2 World Championship =

7th running of the Moto2 World Championship

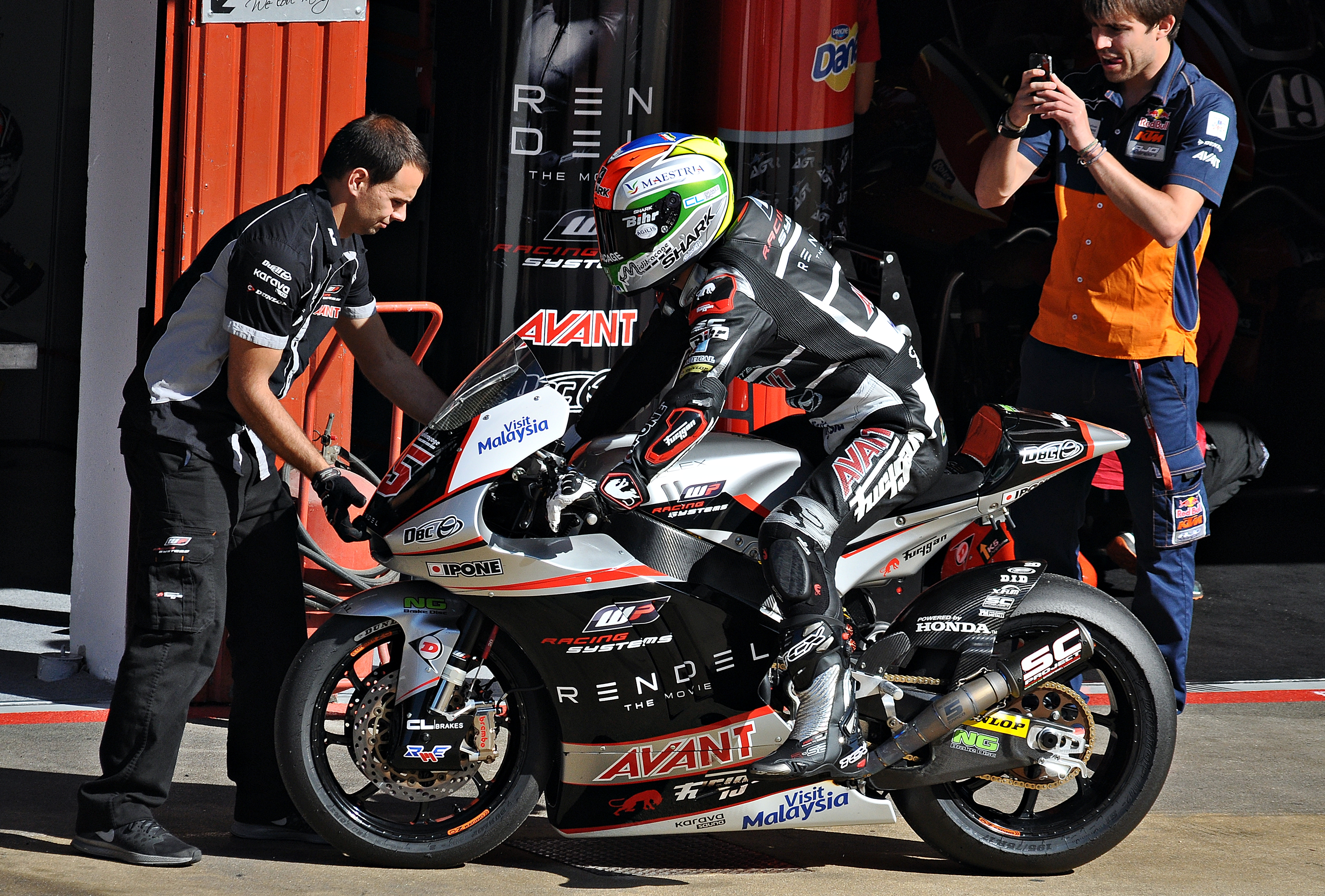
Johann Zarco (pictured in 2015) was the 2016 Moto2 World Riders' Champion.

The 2016 FIM Moto2 World Championship was the intermediate class of the 68th Fédération Internationale de Motocyclisme (FIM) Road Racing World Championship season. The season was marred by the death of Luis Salom during a free practice session, at the Catalan Grand Prix.

Johann Zarco started the season as the defending World Champion, having secured his first championship title at the 2015 Japanese Grand Prix. With victory at the Malaysian Grand Prix – his sixth of the 2016 season – Zarco was able to retain his title, amassing an unassailable points lead ahead of the final round in Valencia. As a result, Zarco became the first French rider to win multiple world motorcycle racing titles, as well as becoming the first rider in the Moto2 era to defend the world championship, and the first to do so in the intermediate class since Jorge Lorenzo in 2006 and 2007. Zarco completed the season with victory in Valencia, as he won the championship by an eventual margin of 42 points.

The runner-up position remained up for grabs in Valencia, as four-time winner Thomas Lüthi, double winner Álex Rins and Franco Morbidelli all had a mathematical chance of finishing there. Ultimately with a second-place finish, Lüthi finished clear of Rins by 20 points; Lüthi's last-lap pass on Morbidelli also cost the latter third place in the championship by a point, as Rins had finished the race in fifth place. Morbidelli took a total of eight podium finishes, including each of the last five races, but was unable to take a victory. Four other riders won races; Sam Lowes took two race victories at Jerez and Aragon, Jonas Folger won at Brno, while first Grand Prix victories went to Takaaki Nakagami at Assen, and Lorenzo Baldassarri in Misano. The constructors' championship went to Kalex with a maximum score of 450 points, with a 34-race winning streak at the conclusion of the season – a run stretching back to a Speed Up victory for Lowes at the 2015 Motorcycle Grand Prix of the Americas.

== Changes for 2016 ==
- French oil and gas giants company Total was selected to become official fuel supplier of Moto2 and Moto3 beginning from 2016 onwards, replacing Eni after five seasons as a fuel supplier of Moto2 and Moto3.

== Calendar ==
The following Grands Prix took place in 2016.

Round	Date	Grand Prix	Circuit
1	20 March ‡	Commercial Bank Grand Prix of Qatar	Lusail International Circuit, Lusail
2	3 April	Gran Premio Motul de la República Argentina	Autódromo Termas de Río Hondo, Termas de Río Hondo
3	10 April	(United States) Red Bull Grand Prix of the Americas	Circuit of the Americas, Austin
4	24 April	(Spain) Gran Premio Red Bull de España	Circuito de Jerez, Jerez de la Frontera
5	8 May	Monster Energy Grand Prix de France	Bugatti Circuit, Le Mans
6	22 May	(Italy) Gran Premio d'Italia TIM	Mugello Circuit, Scarperia e San Piero
7	5 June	(Catalonia) Gran Premi Monster Energy de Catalunya	Circuit de Barcelona-Catalunya, Montmeló
8	26 June	(Netherlands) Motul TT Assen	TT Circuit Assen, Assen
9	17 July	(Germany) GoPro Motorrad Grand Prix Deutschland	Sachsenring, Hohenstein-Ernstthal
10	14 August	(Austria) NeroGiardini Motorrad Grand Prix von Österreich	Red Bull Ring, Spielberg
11	21 August	(Czech Republic) HJC Helmets Grand Prix České republiky	Brno Circuit, Brno
12	4 September	(United Kingdom) Octo British Grand Prix	Silverstone Circuit, Silverstone
13	11 September	Gran Premio TIM di San Marino e della Riviera di Rimini	Misano World Circuit, Misano Adriatico
14	25 September	(Aragon) Gran Premio Movistar de Aragón	MotorLand Aragón, Alcañiz
15	16 October	Motul Grand Prix of Japan	Motegi Circuit, Motegi
16	23 October	(Australia) Michelin Australian Motorcycle Grand Prix	Phillip Island Grand Prix Circuit, Phillip Island
17	30 October	Shell Malaysia Motorcycle Grand Prix	Sepang International Circuit, Sepang
18	13 November	(Valencian Community) Gran Premio Motul de la Comunitat Valenciana	Circuit Ricardo Tormo, Valencia

‡ = Night race

=== Calendar changes ===
- The Grand Prix of the Americas and the Argentine Grand Prix have swapped places, with Argentina hosting the second round, while the Grand Prix of the Americas hosts the third round.
- For the first time in the history of the Dutch TT, the races were held on a Sunday.
- The 2016 season had seen the return of the Austrian Grand Prix to the series' schedule after 19 years of absence. The last race, which had been the 1997 Austrian Grand Prix, was held at the A1-Ring, now called the Red Bull Ring.
- Having been on the calendar since 2008, the Indianapolis Grand Prix was taken off the calendar.

== Teams and riders ==
A provisional entry list was announced on 7 November 2015. All Moto2 competitors raced with an identical CBR600RR inline-four engine developed by Honda. Teams competed with tyres supplied by Dunlop.

Team	Constructor	Motorcycle	No.	Rider	Rounds
(Spain) Sports-Millions-Emwe-SAG (Spain) SAG Team	Kalex	Kalex Moto2	2	(Switzerland) Jesko Raffin	All
(Spain) Sports-Millions-Emwe-SAG (Spain) SAG Team	Kalex	Kalex Moto2	39	(Spain) Luis Salom	1–7
(Spain) AGR Team	Kalex	Kalex Moto2	4	(South Africa) Steven Odendaal	14
(Spain) AGR Team	Kalex	Kalex Moto2	23	(Germany) Marcel Schrötter	All
(Spain) AGR Team	Kalex	Kalex Moto2	49	(Spain) Axel Pons	All
(Finland) Ajo Motorsport (Finland) Ajo Motorsport Academy	Kalex	Kalex Moto2	5	(France) Johann Zarco	All
(Finland) Ajo Motorsport (Finland) Ajo Motorsport Academy	Kalex	Kalex Moto2	45	(Japan) Tetsuta Nagashima	14–15
(Switzerland) Forward Team	Kalex	Kalex Moto2	7	(Italy) Lorenzo Baldassarri	All
(Switzerland) Forward Team	Kalex	Kalex Moto2	10	(Italy) Luca Marini	All
JPMoto Malaysia	Suter	Suter MMX2	8	(Spain) Efrén Vázquez	1–3
JPMoto Malaysia	Suter	Suter MMX2	69	(United States) Danny Eslick	5
JPMoto Malaysia	Suter	Suter MMX2	88	(Spain) Ricard Cardús	6
(Germany) Dynavolt Intact GP	Kalex	Kalex Moto2	11	(Germany) Sandro Cortese	All
(Germany) Dynavolt Intact GP	Kalex	Kalex Moto2	94	(Germany) Jonas Folger	All
(Switzerland) Garage Plus Interwetten (Switzerland) CarXpert Interwetten	Kalex	Kalex Moto2	12	(Switzerland) Thomas Lüthi	All
(Switzerland) Garage Plus Interwetten (Switzerland) CarXpert Interwetten	Kalex	Kalex Moto2	27	(Spain) Iker Lecuona	12–13, 15–18
(Switzerland) Garage Plus Interwetten (Switzerland) CarXpert Interwetten	Kalex	Kalex Moto2	70	(Switzerland) Robin Mulhauser	All
(Switzerland) Garage Plus Interwetten (Switzerland) CarXpert Interwetten	Kalex	Kalex Moto2	77	(Switzerland) Dominique Aegerter	1–11, 14
(Japan) Idemitsu Honda Team Asia	Kalex	Kalex Moto2	14	(Thailand) Ratthapark Wilairot	1–7, 9–18
(Japan) Idemitsu Honda Team Asia	Kalex	Kalex Moto2	30	(Japan) Takaaki Nakagami	All
(France) Promoto Sport	TransFIORmers	???	16	(France) Hugo Clere	18
(Qatar) QMMF Racing Team	Speed Up	Speed Up SF16	19	(Belgium) Xavier Siméon	All
(Qatar) QMMF Racing Team	Speed Up	Speed Up SF16	60	(Spain) Julián Simón	All
(Luxembourg) Leopard Racing	Kalex	Kalex Moto2	20	(Italy) Alessandro Nocco	16–17
(Luxembourg) Leopard Racing	Kalex	Kalex Moto2	44	(Portugal) Miguel Oliveira	1–15, 18
(Luxembourg) Leopard Racing	Kalex	Kalex Moto2	52	(United Kingdom) Danny Kent	All
(Belgium) Estrella Galicia 0,0 Marc VDS	Kalex	Kalex Moto2	21	(Italy) Franco Morbidelli	All
(Belgium) Estrella Galicia 0,0 Marc VDS	Kalex	Kalex Moto2	73	(Spain) Álex Márquez	All
(Italy) Federal Oil Gresini Moto2	Kalex	Kalex Moto2	22	(United Kingdom) Sam Lowes	All
(Italy) Speed Up Racing	Speed Up	Speed Up SF16	24	(Italy) Simone Corsi	All
(France) Tech 3 Racing	Tech 3	Tech 3 Mistral 610	32	(Spain) Isaac Viñales	All
(France) Tech 3 Racing	Tech 3	Tech 3 Mistral 610	97	(Spain) Xavi Vierge	All
(Italy) Tasca Racing Scuderia Moto2	Kalex	Kalex Moto2	33	(Italy) Alessandro Tonucci	1–6
(Italy) Tasca Racing Scuderia Moto2	Kalex	Kalex Moto2	87	(Australia) Remy Gardner	7–18
(Spain) Páginas Amarillas HP 40	Kalex	Kalex Moto2	40	(Spain) Álex Rins	All
(Spain) Páginas Amarillas HP 40	Kalex	Kalex Moto2	57	(Spain) Edgar Pons	1–2, 4, 6–18
(Italy) Team Ciatti	Kalex	Kalex Moto2	42	(Italy) Federico Fuligni	4, 6, 13, 18
(Italy) Italtrans Racing Team	Kalex	Kalex Moto2	54	(Italy) Mattia Pasini	All
Petronas Raceline Malaysia; Petronas AHM Malaysia	Kalex	Kalex Moto2	55	(Malaysia) Hafizh Syahrin	All
Petronas Raceline Malaysia; Petronas AHM Malaysia	Kalex	Kalex Moto2	93	(Malaysia) Ramdan Rosli	7, 16–17
Japan-GP2	Kalex	Kalex Moto2	63	(Japan) Naomichi Uramoto	15
(Japan) Team Taro Plus One	TSR	???	84	(Japan) Taro Sekiguchi	15
(Japan) NTS T.Pro Project	NTS	???	89	(France) Alan Techer	14
(Czech Republic) Montáže Brož Racing Team	Suter	Suter MMX2	95	(Australia) Anthony West	11

Key
Regular rider
Wildcard rider
Replacement rider

=== Team changes ===
- JiR Moto2 announced that they would withdraw from the championship at the end of the 2015 season.
- Dynavolt Intact GP expanded to enter a second bike, while Italtrans Racing downgraded to a single entry in 2016.
- Leopard Racing returned to the Moto2 class after previously competing as Kiefer Racing from 2010 to 2012. The team competed on Kalex bikes, with Danny Kent and Miguel Oliveira as their riders.
- AGP Racing, who were listed on the provisional entry list, withdrew from the championship due to financial problems, leaving Federico Fuligni and Remy Gardner without rides.
- IodaRacing Project SRL also withdrew from the championship.

=== Rider changes ===
- Luis Salom left Paginas Amarillas HP 40 at the end of the 2015 season to join Stop and Go Racing Team.
- Salom's place at Pons Racing was taken by 2015 FIM CEV Moto2 European Championship winner Edgar Pons.
- Moto3 World Champion Danny Kent returned to the Moto2 class with Leopard Racing, following a season with Tech 3 back in 2013.
- Franco Morbidelli moved to Estrella Galicia 0,0 Marc VDS, following Tito Rabat's decision to join MotoGP with Marc VDS for 2016.
- Simone Corsi left Forward Racing at the end of the 2015 season to join Speed Up Racing.
- Jonas Folger left the AGR Team to join Dynavolt Intact GP.
- Sam Lowes replaced Xavier Siméon at Federal Oil Gresini Moto2 as part of a contract-signing for a MotoGP seat with Gresini in 2017. Siméon joined the QMMF Racing Team as a result.
- Mika Kallio returned to MotoGP, after being left without a ride in Moto2. He joined KTM as a test rider for their 2017 MotoGP project.
- Miguel Oliveira moved up to the Moto2 class, joining Leopard Racing.
- Randy Krummenacher left Moto2 to join the Supersport World Championship following JiR's withdrawal from the championship.
- After competing in the second half of the 2015 season with Tech 3 as a replacement rider, Xavi Vierge moved full-time to Moto2 with the same team.
- Efrén Vázquez moved up to the Moto2 class with JPMoto Malaysia replacing Ricard Cardús. Vázquez previously competed in the intermediate class in 2007.
- Luca Marini stepped up to the Moto2 class, with the Forward Team.
- Isaac Viñales moved up to the Moto2 class with Tech 3, replacing Marcel Schrötter. Schrötter moved to the AGR Team.
- Alessandro Tonucci moved up to the Moto2 class with Tasca Racing Scuderia Moto2 replacing Louis Rossi.
- Ratthapark Wilairot made a full-time return to Moto2 with Idemitsu Honda Team Asia.
- Azlan Shah, who was on the provisional entry list with JPMoto Malaysia, withdrew due to financial problems.

==== Mid-season changes ====
- After the Grand Prix of the Americas, Efrén Vázquez left the JPMoto Malaysia team. He was replaced by Danny Eslick in the 5th race and by Ricard Cardús in the 6th race. Before the 7th race, the JPMoto Malaysia team went bankrupt, so the team retired from the rest of the season.
- After the Italian Grand Prix, Alessandro Tonucci left the Tasca Racing Scuderia team. He was replaced by Remy Gardner for the rest of the season starting with the 7th race.
- Luis Salom was killed after an accident during Friday practice at the Catalan Grand Prix. His teammate Jesko Raffin withdrew from the weekend. Before the Dutch TT, the SAG Racing Team announced that they will complete the season with Raffin as the team's sole rider, with Salom's spot on the team left vacated for the rest of the season.
- Dominique Aegerter got injured after the Czech Republic Grand Prix, so he was replaced by Iker Lecuona for the 12th and the 13th races. Aegerter returned for the 14th race. However, upon signing a 2017 contract with Leopard Racing, he was fired from Interwetten, bringing Lecuona back for the remaining 4 races.

== Results and standings ==
=== Grands Prix ===
Round	Grand Prix	Pole position	Fastest lap	Winning rider	Winning team	Winning constructor	Report
1	Qatar motorcycle Grand Prix	(Germany) Jonas Folger	(United Kingdom) Sam Lowes	(Switzerland) Thomas Lüthi	(Switzerland) Garage Plus Interwetten	(Germany) Kalex	Report
2	(Argentina) Argentine Republic motorcycle Grand Prix	(United Kingdom) Sam Lowes	(France) Johann Zarco	(France) Johann Zarco	(Finland) Ajo Motorsport	(Germany) Kalex	Report
3	(United States) Motorcycle Grand Prix of the Americas	(Spain) Álex Rins	(United Kingdom) Sam Lowes	(Spain) Álex Rins	(Spain) Páginas Amarillas HP 40	(Germany) Kalex	Report
4	(Spain) Spanish motorcycle Grand Prix	(United Kingdom) Sam Lowes	(Spain) Álex Rins	(United Kingdom) Sam Lowes	(Italy) Federal Oil Gresini Moto2	(Germany) Kalex	Report
5	(France) French motorcycle Grand Prix	(Switzerland) Thomas Lüthi	(Spain) Álex Rins	(Spain) Álex Rins	(Spain) Páginas Amarillas HP 40	(Germany) Kalex	Report
6	(Italy) Italian motorcycle Grand Prix	(United Kingdom) Sam Lowes	(Switzerland) Thomas Lüthi	(France) Johann Zarco	(Finland) Ajo Motorsport	(Germany) Kalex	Report
7	(Catalonia) Catalan motorcycle Grand Prix	(France) Johann Zarco	(France) Johann Zarco	(France) Johann Zarco	(Finland) Ajo Motorsport	(Germany) Kalex	Report
8	(Netherlands) Dutch TT	(Switzerland) Thomas Lüthi	(Japan) Takaaki Nakagami	(Japan) Takaaki Nakagami	(Japan) Idemitsu Honda Team Asia	(Germany) Kalex	Report
9	(Germany) German motorcycle Grand Prix	(Japan) Takaaki Nakagami	(Belgium) Xavier Siméon	(France) Johann Zarco	(Finland) Ajo Motorsport	(Germany) Kalex	Report
10	(Austria) Austrian motorcycle Grand Prix	(France) Johann Zarco	(France) Johann Zarco	(France) Johann Zarco	(Finland) Ajo Motorsport	(Germany) Kalex	Report
11	Czech Republic motorcycle Grand Prix	(France) Johann Zarco	(Germany) Jonas Folger	(Germany) Jonas Folger	(Germany) Dynavolt Intact GP	(Germany) Kalex	Report
12	(United Kingdom) British motorcycle Grand Prix	(United Kingdom) Sam Lowes	(Switzerland) Thomas Lüthi	(Switzerland) Thomas Lüthi	(Switzerland) Garage Plus Interwetten	(Germany) Kalex	Report
13	San Marino and Rimini Riviera motorcycle Grand Prix	(France) Johann Zarco	(Spain) Álex Rins	(Italy) Lorenzo Baldassarri	(Switzerland) Forward Team	(Germany) Kalex	Report
14	Aragon motorcycle Grand Prix	(United Kingdom) Sam Lowes	(Italy) Franco Morbidelli	(United Kingdom) Sam Lowes	(Italy) Federal Oil Gresini Moto2	(Germany) Kalex	Report
15	(Japan) Japanese motorcycle Grand Prix	(France) Johann Zarco	(Italy) Franco Morbidelli	(Switzerland) Thomas Lüthi	(Switzerland) Garage Plus Interwetten	(Germany) Kalex	Report
16	(Australia) Australian motorcycle Grand Prix	(Switzerland) Thomas Lüthi	(Italy) Franco Morbidelli	(Switzerland) Thomas Lüthi	(Switzerland) Garage Plus Interwetten	(Germany) Kalex	Report
17	(Malaysia) Malaysian motorcycle Grand Prix	(France) Johann Zarco	(Italy) Luca Marini	(France) Johann Zarco	(Finland) Ajo Motorsport	(Germany) Kalex	Report
18	Valencian Community motorcycle Grand Prix	(France) Johann Zarco	(France) Johann Zarco	(France) Johann Zarco	(Finland) Ajo Motorsport	(Germany) Kalex	Report

=== Riders' standings ===
Scoring system

Points were awarded to the top fifteen finishers. A rider had to finish the race to earn points.

Position	**1st**	**2nd**	**3rd**	**4th**	**5th**	**6th**	**7th**	**8th**	**9th**	**10th**	**11th**	**12th**	**13th**	**14th**	**15th**
Points	25	20	16	13	11	10	9	8	7	6	5	4	3	2	1

Pos	Rider	Bike	QAT (Qatar)	ARG (Argentina)	AME (United States)	SPA (Spain)	FRA (France)	ITA (Italy)	CAT (Catalonia)	NED (Netherlands)	GER (Germany)	AUT (Austria)	CZE (Czech Republic)	GBR (United Kingdom)	RSM (San Marino)	ARA (Aragon)	JPN (Japan)	AUS (Australia)	MAL (Malaysia)	VAL (Valencian Community)	Pts
1	(France) Johann Zarco	Kalex	12	1	3	5	24	1	**1**	2	1	**1**	**11**	22	**4**	8	**2**	12	**1**	**1**	276
2	(Switzerland) Thomas Lüthi	Kalex	1	7	7	6	**3**	4	5	**Ret**	Ret	4	DNS	1	6	4	1	**1**	6	2	234
3	(Spain) Álex Rins	Kalex	8	4	**1**	3	1	7	2	6	Ret	3	2	7	2	6	20	Ret	14	5	214
4	(Italy) Franco Morbidelli	Kalex	7	25	14	4	4	8	11	3	Ret	2	8	2	5	3	3	2	2	3	213
5	(United Kingdom) Sam Lowes	Kalex	9	**2**	2	**1**	6	**3**	6	4	Ret	Ret	3	**21**	Ret	**1**	Ret	Ret	Ret	4	175
6	(Japan) Takaaki Nakagami	Kalex	14	9	15	7	5	9	3	1	**11**	7	Ret	3	3	5	4	5	21	6	169
7	(Germany) Jonas Folger	Kalex	**Ret**	3	5	2	Ret	15	7	10	2	26	1	5	8	10	Ret	6	3	8	167
8	(Italy) Lorenzo Baldassarri	Kalex	DNS	13	23	17	17	2	14	5	5	8	16	6	1	7	Ret	4	4	14	127
9	(Malaysia) Hafizh Syahrin	Kalex	4	6	16	11	8	5	4	Ret	7	21	6	4	7	14	13	Ret	5	15	118
10	(Italy) Simone Corsi	Speed Up	3	20	6	Ret	2	12	Ret	7	Ret	Ret	19	8	Ret	9	6	7	11	11	103
11	(Italy) Mattia Pasini	Kalex	16	10	17	12	16	Ret	12	19	4	13	4	9	16	12	7	Ret	23	7	72
12	(Switzerland) Dominique Aegerter	Kalex	5	5	4	8	13	10	Ret	9	10	10	17			22					71
13	(Spain) Álex Márquez	Kalex	Ret	Ret	11	Ret	Ret	16	18	8	Ret	6	5	25	10	2	Ret	DNS	7	Ret	69
14	(Germany) Marcel Schrötter	Kalex	17	11	10	Ret	14	18	10	13	Ret	5	18	11	11	15	9	9	20	10	64
15	(Germany) Sandro Cortese	Kalex	15	Ret	12	Ret	DNS	11	Ret	12	15	11	23	12	9	13	5	3	17	Ret	61
16	(Spain) Axel Pons	Kalex	Ret	8	22	Ret	7	6	9	Ret	Ret	9	Ret	10	Ret	16	Ret	8	Ret	Ret	55
17	(Belgium) Xavier Siméon	Speed Up	Ret	12	8	10	11	DNS	Ret	11	Ret	23	15	16	Ret	11	10	11	15	16	46
18	(Spain) Julián Simón	Speed Up	Ret	19	9	DNS	Ret	17	13	16	3	15	13	14	Ret	21	8	Ret	DNS	23	40
19	(Spain) Luis Salom^{†}	Kalex	2	15	13	9	10	Ret	DNS^{†}												37
20	(Spain) Xavi Vierge	Tech 3	Ret	14	20	Ret	15	Ret	20	17	Ret	16	12	13	12	17	11	10	8	12	37
21	(Portugal) Miguel Oliveira	Kalex	11	21	Ret	Ret	9	13	8	15	Ret	14	9	Ret	17	DNS	DNS			13	36
22	(United Kingdom) Danny Kent	Kalex	6	16	Ret	Ret	19	14	Ret	14	DNS	12	7	15	Ret	29	Ret	Ret	18	9	35
23	(Italy) Luca Marini	Kalex	10	18	Ret	16	12	Ret	Ret	Ret	6	17	Ret	Ret	13	25	12	16	9	22	34
24	(Spain) Isaac Viñales	Tech 3	19	24	18	13	20	24	16	21	9	18	14	Ret	Ret	28	15	DNS	10	Ret	19
25	(Switzerland) Jesko Raffin	Kalex	18	23	21	14	23	26	DNS	18	8	24	24	17	15	20	17	13	16	17	14
26	(Australia) Remy Gardner	Kalex							15	20	12	19	21	20	19	19	19	Ret	13	18	8
27	(Australia) Anthony West	Suter											10								6
28	(Thailand) Ratthapark Wilairot	Kalex	13	17	19	Ret	21	22	Ret		Ret	22	25	18	14	26	18	15	24	20	6
29	(Malaysia) Ramdan Rosli	Kalex							19									18	12		4
30	(Switzerland) Robin Mulhauser	Kalex	20	22	Ret	15	18	21	21	22	13	25	22	24	20	27	Ret	17	Ret	21	4
31	(Spain) Edgar Pons	Kalex	Ret	DNS		DNS		23	17	23	14	20	20	23	Ret	24	16	14	19	19	4
32	(Japan) Tetsuta Nagashima	Kalex														23	14				2
33	(Italy) Federico Fuligni	Kalex				18		20							18					Ret	0
34	(South Africa) Steven Odendaal	Kalex														18					0
35	(Italy) Alessandro Tonucci	Kalex	21	27	24	19	22	25													0
36	(Spain) Iker Lecuona	Kalex												19	21		Ret	Ret	22	24	0
37	(Spain) Ricard Cardús	Suter						19													0
38	(Japan) Naomichi Uramoto	Kalex															21				0
39	(Spain) Efrén Vázquez	Suter	22	26	DNS																0
40	(Japan) Taro Sekiguchi	TSR															22				0
41	(United States) Danny Eslick	Suter					25														0
	(Italy) Alessandro Nocco	Kalex																Ret	Ret		0
	(France) Hugo Clere	TransFIORmers																		Ret	0
	(France) Alan Techer	NTS														Ret					0
Pos	Rider	Bike	QAT (Qatar)	ARG (Argentina)	AME (United States)	SPA (Spain)	FRA (France)	ITA (Italy)	CAT (Catalonia)	NED (Netherlands)	GER (Germany)	AUT (Austria)	CZE (Czech Republic)	GBR (United Kingdom)	RSM (San Marino)	ARA (Aragon)	JPN (Japan)	AUS (Australia)	MAL (Malaysia)	VAL (Valencian Community)	Pts

Colour	Result
Gold	Winner
Silver	Second place
Bronze	Third place
Green	Points classification
Blue	Non-points classification
Blue	Non-classified finish (NC)
Purple	Retired, not classified (Ret)
Red	Did not qualify (DNQ)
Red	Did not pre-qualify (DNPQ)
Black	Disqualified (DSQ)
White	Did not start (DNS)
White	Withdrew (WD)
White	Race cancelled (C)
Blank	Did not practice (DNP)
Blank	Did not arrive (DNA)
Blank	Excluded (EX)

**Bold** – Pole
Italics – Fastest Lap
Light blue – Rookie
† – Rider deceased

=== Constructors' standings ===
Each constructor received the same number of points as their best placed rider in each race.

Pos	Constructor	QAT (Qatar)	ARG (Argentina)	AME (United States)	SPA (Spain)	FRA (France)	ITA (Italy)	CAT (Catalonia)	NED (Netherlands)	GER (Germany)	AUT (Austria)	CZE (Czech Republic)	GBR (United Kingdom)	RSM (San Marino)	ARA (Aragon)	JPN (Japan)	AUS (Australia)	MAL (Malaysia)	VAL (Valencian Community)	Pts
1	(Germany) Kalex	1	1	1	1	1	1	1	1	1	1	1	1	1	1	1	1	1	1	450
2	(Italy) Speed Up	3	12	6	10	2	12	13	7	3	15	13	8	Ret	9	6	7	11	11	136
3	(France) Tech 3	19	14	18	13	15	24	16	17	9	16	12	13	12	17	11	10	8	12	47
4	(Switzerland) Suter	22	26	DNS		25	19					10								6
	(Japan) TSR															22				0
	(France) TransFIORmers																		Ret	0
	(Japan) NTS														Ret					0
Pos	Constructor	QAT (Qatar)	ARG (Argentina)	AME (United States)	SPA (Spain)	FRA (France)	ITA (Italy)	CAT (Catalonia)	NED (Netherlands)	GER (Germany)	AUT (Austria)	CZE (Czech Republic)	GBR (United Kingdom)	RSM (San Marino)	ARA (Aragon)	JPN (Japan)	AUS (Australia)	MAL (Malaysia)	VAL (Valencian Community)	Pts
