= Luca Vitali (motorcyclist) =

Italian motorcycle racer (born 1992)

- Nationality: Italian
- Born: 30 March 1992 (age 34); Rimini, Italy
- Current team: Revo-M2 Racing
- Bike number: 49
Motorcycle racing career statistics
125cc World Championship
Active years	2008–2009
Manufacturers	Aprilia
Championships	0
2009 championship position	NC (0 pts)
Starts / Wins / Podiums / Poles / F. laps / Points; 17 / 0 / 0 / 0 / 0 / 0
Superbike World Championship
Active years	2023
Manufacturers	Kawasaki
Championships	0
2023 championship position	NC (0 pts)
Starts / Wins / Podiums / Poles / F. laps / Points; 3 / 0 / 0 / 0 / 0 / 0

Luca Vitali (born 30 March 1992) is an Italian motorcycle racer, currently competing in the FIM Endurance World Cup aboard an Aprilia RSV4.

Vitali's father, Maurizio, is a former motorcycle racer. He previously competed in the 125cc World Championship, the FIM CEV Moto2 Championship, the CIV Stock 600 Championship, the CIV 125GP Championship and the European Superstock 600 Championship.

== Career statistics ==
2007: 1st, CIV Sport Production 125 Trophy
2008: 11th, CIV 125GP Championship #10 Aprilia RS125R
2010: 8th, CIV Stock 600 Championship #10 Yamaha YZF-R6
2011: 5th, CIV Stock 600 Championship #70 Yamaha YZF-R6
2012: 4th, CIV Stock 600 Championship #70 Yamaha YZF-R6
2013: 3rd, CIV Stock 600 Championship #70 Suzuki GSX-R600

=== Grand Prix motorcycle racing ===
==== By season ====
Season	Class	Motorcycle	Team	Number	Race	Win	Podium	Pole	FLap	Pts	Plcd
2008	125cc	Aprilia	RCGM	42	2	0	0	0	0	0	NC
2008	125cc	Aprilia	Grizzly Gas Kiefer Racing	42	2	0	0	0	0	0	NC
2009	125cc	Aprilia	CBC Corse	10	15	0	0	0	0	0	NC
Total					**17**	**0**	**0**	**0**	**0**	**0**	

==== Races by year ====
(key) (Races in bold indicate pole position; races in italics indicate fastest lap)

Year	Class	Bike	1	2	3	4	5	6	7	8	9	10	11	12	13	14	15	16	17	Pos	Pts
2008	125cc	Aprilia	QAT	SPA	POR	CHN	FRA	ITA; 30	CAT	GBR	NED	GER	CZE	RSM; 25	IND	JPN	AUS	MAL	VAL	NC	0
2009	125cc	Aprilia	QAT; 28	JPN; 26	SPA; DSQ	FRA; Ret	ITA; 25	CAT; 26	NED; 25	GER; DNQ	GBR; 21	CZE; 25	IND; 25	RSM; 27	POR; 22	AUS; 25	MAL; Ret	VAL; Ret		NC	0

=== European Superstock 600 ===
==== Races by year ====
(key) (Races in bold indicate pole position, races in italics indicate fastest lap)

Year	Bike	1	2	3	4	5	6	7	8	9	10	Pos	Pts
2011	Yamaha	ASS	MNZ; 7	MIS; Ret	ARA	BRN	SIL	NÜR	IMO; 22	MAG	POR; 8	22nd	17
2012	Yamaha	IMO; 19	ASS; 7	MNZ; 5	MIS; 4	ARA; 7	BRN; 12	SIL; 9	NÜR; 10	POR; 9	MAG; 10	7th	72
2013	Suzuki	ARA; 13	ASS; Ret	MNZ; 11	POR; 9	IMO; 12	SIL1; 12	SIL2; 13	NÜR; 15	MAG; Ret	JER; 10	16th	33
2015	Kawasaki	SPA; Ret	SPA; 8	NED; Ret	ITA; 6	POR; Ret	ITA; 6	SPA; 7	FRA; 4			7th	50

=== FIM CEV Moto2 European Championship ===
==== Races by year ====
(key) (Races in bold indicate pole position, races in italics indicate fastest lap)

Year	Bike	1	2	3	4	5	6	7	8	9	10	Pos	Pts
2014	Ariane	JER; Ret	ARA1; Ret	ARA2; Ret	CAT; 8	ALB; 7	NAV1; Ret	NAV2; 8	ALG1; Ret	ALG2; 4	VAL; 10	10th	44

=== Superstock 1000 Cup ===
==== Races by year ====
(key) (Races in bold indicate pole position) (Races in italics indicate fastest lap)

Year	Bike	1	2	3	4	5	6	7	8	Pos	Pts
2016	BMW	ARA; 11	NED; 12	IMO; 6	DON; DNS	MIS; 6	LAU; 8	MAG; Ret	JER; 19	12th	37

=== European Superstock 1000 Championship ===
==== Races by year ====
(key) (Races in bold indicate pole position) (Races in italics indicate fastest lap)

Year	Bike	1	2	3	4	5	6	7	8	9	Pos	Pts
2017	Aprilia	ARA; 7	NED; 10	IMO; Ret	DON; 9	MIS; 4	LAU; 7	ALG; 8	MAG; 8	JER; 12	10th	64
2018	Aprilia	ARA; 7	NED; 6	IMO; 6	DON; 4	BRN; 6	MIS; 9	ALG; Ret	MAG; 5		6th	70

=== Superbike World Championship ===
==== Races by year ====
(key) (Races in bold indicate pole position) (Races in italics indicate fastest lap)

Year	Bike	1			2			3			4			5			6			7			8			9			10			11			12			Pos	Pts
Year	Bike	R1	SR	R2	R1	SR	R2	R1	SR	R2	R1	SR	R2	R1	SR	R2	R1	SR	R2	R1	SR	R2	R1	SR	R2	R1	SR	R2	R1	SR	R2	R1	SR	R2	R1	SR	R2	Pos	Pts
2023	Kawasaki	AUS	AUS	AUS	INA	INA	INA	NED	NED	NED	BAR	BAR	BAR	MIS; Ret	MIS; 18	MIS; Ret	GBR	GBR	GBR	IMO	IMO	IMO	CZE	CZE	CZE	FRA	FRA	FRA	ARA	ARA	ARA	POR	POR	POR	SPA	SPA	SPA	NC	0

=== FIM Endurance World Cup ===
Year	Team	Bike	Tyre	Rider	Pts	TC
2025	(Italy) Revo-M2	Aprilia RSV4	**D**	(Italy) Simone Saltarelli (Italy) Flavio Ferroni (Italy) Kevin Calia (Italy) Luca Vitali	57	6th
