= Aitor Rodríguez =

Spanish motorcycle racer

- Nationality: Spanish
- Born: 23 April 1984 (age 42); Alcorcón, Spain

Aitor Rodríguez Fernández is a Grand Prix motorcycle racer from Spain.

== Career statistics ==
=== By season ===
Season	Class	Motorcycle	Team	Number	Race	Win	Podium	Pole	FLap	Pts	Plcd
2009	250cc	Aprilia	Milar - Juegos Lucky	77	7	0	0	0	0	0	NC
2009	250cc	Aprilia	Matteoni Racing	77	7	0	0	0	0	0	NC
Total					7	0	0	0	0	0	

=== Races by year ===
Year	Class	Bike	1	2	3	4	5	6	7	8	9	10	11	12	13	14	15	16	Pos	Points
2009	250cc	Aprilia	QAT; 19	JPN; 18	SPA; 18	FRA; Ret	ITA	CAT	NED	GER	GBR; 21	CZE; 18	INP	RSM; 19	POR	AUS	MAL	VAL	NC	0
