= 2012 European Superstock 600 Championship =

Motorcycle racing series

2012 European Superstock 600 Championship
Previous:	2011	Next:	2013
Support series: Superbike World Championship; Supersport World Championship; FIM Superstock 1000 Cup; European Junior Cup

The 2012 European Superstock 600 Championship was the eighth season of the European Superstock 600 Championship. The season was contested over ninth races, beginning at Autodromo Enzo e Dino Ferrari on 1 April and ending at Circuit de Nevers Magny-Cours on 7 October. Michael Van Der Mark won the title after beating Riccardo Russo.

== Race calendar and results ==
2012 Calendar
Round	Country	Circuit	Date	Pole position	Fastest lap	Winning rider	Winning team
1	Italy	Autodromo Enzo e Dino Ferrari	1 April	(Italy) Riccardo Russo	(Spain) Nacho Calero	(Italy) Riccardo Russo	Team Italia FMI
2	Netherlands	TT Circuit Assen	22 April	(Switzerland) Bastien Chesaux	(Denmark) Alex Schacht	(Netherlands) Michael Van Der Mark	EAB Ten Kate Junior Team
3	Italy	Autodromo Nazionale Monza	6 May	(Italy) Riccardo Russo	(Italy) Riccardo Russo	(Italy) Riccardo Russo	Team Italia FMI
4	San Marino	Misano World Circuit Marco Simoncelli	10 June	(Italy) Franco Morbidelli	(Netherlands) Michael Van Der Mark	(Netherlands) Michael Van Der Mark	EAB Ten Kate Junior Team
5	Spain	Motorland Aragón	1 July	(Italy) Riccardo Russo	(Italy) Riccardo Russo	(Italy) Riccardo Russo	Team Italia FMI
6	Czech Republic	Brno Circuit	22 July	(Italy) Riccardo Russo	(Belgium) Gauthier Duwelz	(Netherlands) Michael Van Der Mark	EAB Ten Kate Junior Team
7	United Kingdom	Silverstone Circuit	5 August	(Netherlands) Michael Van Der Mark	(United Kingdom) Lee Jackson	(Italy) Riccardo Russo	Team Italia FMI
8	Germany	Nürburgring	8 September	(Netherlands) Michael Van Der Mark	(Netherlands) Michael Van Der Mark	(Netherlands) Michael Van Der Mark	EAB Ten Kate Junior Team
9	Portugal	Algarve International Circuit	23 September	(Netherlands) Michael Van Der Mark	(Netherlands) Michael Van Der Mark	(Netherlands) Michael Van Der Mark	EAB Ten Kate Junior Team
10	France	Circuit de Nevers Magny-Cours	7 October	(Netherlands) Michael Van Der Mark	(Italy) Riccardo Russo	(Netherlands) Michael Van Der Mark	EAB Ten Kate Junior Team

== Entry list ==
Team	Constructor	Motorcycle	No.	Rider	Rounds
Benjan Racing	Honda	Honda CBR600RR	9	(Netherlands) Koen Zeelen	1–5
EAB Ten Kate Junior Team	Honda	Honda CBR600RR	8	(Switzerland) Bastien Chesaux	1–5, 7–10
EAB Ten Kate Junior Team	Honda	Honda CBR600RR	28	(Italy) Ferruccio Lamborghini	6
EAB Ten Kate Junior Team	Honda	Honda CBR600RR	60	(Netherlands) Michael Van Der Mark	All
FRT	Honda	Honda CBR600RR	64	(Italy) Riccardo Cecchini	6–10
Kemoto	Honda	Honda CBR600RR	5	(Croatia) Renato Novosel	6
Schacht Racing SBK ONE	Honda	Honda CBR600RR	59	(Denmark) Alex Schacht	All
Team B.S.R.	Honda	Honda CBR600RR	39	(Switzerland) Sébastien Suchet	All
Team B.S.R.	Honda	Honda CBR600RR	111	(Switzerland) Jeremy Ayer	10
Chris Walker Race School	Kawasaki	Kawasaki ZX-6R	14	(United Kingdom) Lee Jackson	7, 10
FP Racing	Kawasaki	Kawasaki ZX-6R	6	(France) Richard de Tournay	1–8, 10
MRS	Kawasaki	Kawasaki ZX-6R	23	(Luxembourg) Christophe Ponsson	All
MRS	Kawasaki	Kawasaki ZX-6R	44	(Australia) Matt Davies	8
Racedays	Kawasaki	Kawasaki ZX-6R	4	(New Zealand) Jake Lewis	6–10
Racedays	Kawasaki	Kawasaki ZX-6R	7	(Germany) Marvin Fritz	1–5
Racedays	Kawasaki	Kawasaki ZX-6R	44	(Australia) Matt Davies	9–10
RaaschieRacing-Team	Kawasaki	Kawasaki ZX-6R	63	(Switzerland) Philippe Von Gunten	10
Team GoEleven	Kawasaki	Kawasaki ZX-6R	15	(Spain) Javier Alviz	10
Team GoEleven	Kawasaki	Kawasaki ZX-6R	18	(Italy) Christian Gamarino	All
Team GoEleven	Kawasaki	Kawasaki ZX-6R	29	(Australia) Corey Snowsill	8–10
Team GoEleven	Kawasaki	Kawasaki ZX-6R	44	(Australia) Matt Davies	1–7
Team GoEleven	Kawasaki	Kawasaki ZX-6R	99	(Netherlands) Tony Coveña	1–6
Team Velocisti	Kawasaki	Kawasaki ZX-6R	81	(Italy) Alessandro Nocco	10
Boselli Races	Suzuki	Suzuki GSX-R600	25	(Italy) Federico Monti	4
SWRT powered Hoegee Suzuki	Suzuki	Suzuki GSX-R600	10	(Netherlands) Wayne Tessels	2
FRT	Triumph	Triumph Daytona 675	64	(Italy) Riccardo Cecchini	1–3, 5
Team Haribo Starmix	Triumph	Triumph Daytona 675	123	(United Kingdom) Alexander Olsen	10
Trickbits FBM Performance	Triumph	Triumph Daytona 675	11	(United Kingdom) Josh Simpson	1–4
Trickbits FBM Performance	Triumph	Triumph Daytona 675	77	(United Kingdom) Tom Weeden	1
Bike Center	Yamaha	Yamaha YZF-R6	32	(Italy) Nicolas Stizza	4
Bike e Motor Racing Team	Yamaha	Yamaha YZF-R6	45	(Croatia) Tedy Bašić	1, 3–4, 6, 8
Bike Service R.T. Bike Service - WTR Ten 10	Yamaha	Yamaha YZF-R6	12	(Italy) Franco Morbidelli	4, 6–10
Bike Service R.T. Bike Service - WTR Ten 10	Yamaha	Yamaha YZF-R6	27	(Italy) Emanuele Viglieno	1
Central Churrasco Mavisport	Yamaha	Yamaha YZF-R6	95	(Portugal) Ruben Nogueira	1–2
Coutelle Racing Team	Yamaha	Yamaha YZF-R6	88	(France) Mathieu Marchal	10
CSM Bucharest	Yamaha	Yamaha YZF-R6	26	(Romania) Mircea Vrajitoru	1–9
Elle 2 Ciatti	Yamaha	Yamaha YZF-R6	53	(Italy) Nicola Jr. Morrentino	1, 3
Fast Bike Service Racing Team	Yamaha	Yamaha YZF-R6	47	(Germany) Marc Buchner	8
FP Evolution	Yamaha	Yamaha YZF-R6	69	(Italy) Gennaro Antonio Romano	1
Garnier Racing Team	Yamaha	Yamaha YZF-R6	43	(France) Stéphane Egea	10
Garnier Racing Team	Yamaha	Yamaha YZF-R6	88	(France) Mathieu Marchal	1–5
G.A.S. Racing Team	Yamaha	Yamaha YZF-R6	51	(Italy) Filippo Benini	1, 3–4
G.A.S. Racing Team	Yamaha	Yamaha YZF-R6	999	(Italy) Francesco Cavalli	1, 3–4
GERIN-SKM Racing Team	Yamaha	Yamaha YZF-R6	34	(Austria) Marco Nekvasil	8, 10
Montaze Broz Racing Team	Yamaha	Yamaha YZF-R6	62	(Czech Republic) Jiri Klejch	6
MTM Racing Team	Yamaha	Yamaha YZF-R6	29	(Australia) Corey Snowsill	1–7
MTM Racing Team	Yamaha	Yamaha YZF-R6	37	(Australia) Mike Jones	8–9
PMR - Planet Motor Racing	Yamaha	Yamaha YZF-R6	36	(France) Morgan Berchet	10
RCGM Team	Yamaha	Yamaha YZF-R6	12	(Italy) Franco Morbidelli	1, 3
RCGM Team	Yamaha	Yamaha YZF-R6	93	(Italy) Roberto Mercandelli	1, 3
Rivamoto Junior Team	Yamaha	Yamaha YZF-R6	71	(Switzerland) Robin Mulhauser	All
SLMoteur	Yamaha	Yamaha YZF-R6	21	(France) Hugo Clere	10
SLMoteur	Yamaha	Yamaha YZF-R6	41	(France) Anthony Dumont	10
SWPN Off. Partn.of Racen Tegen	Yamaha	Yamaha YZF-R6	46	(Netherlands) Davy Thoonen	2
Team4you	Yamaha	Yamaha YZF-R6	90	(France) Kevin Szalai	10
Team ASPI	Yamaha	Yamaha YZF-R6	21	(France) Hugo Clere	7
Team Falcone Competition	Yamaha	Yamaha YZF-R6	43	(France) Stéphane Egea	1–3
Team Italia FMI	Yamaha	Yamaha YZF-R6	70	(Italy) Luca Vitali	All
Team Italia FMI	Yamaha	Yamaha YZF-R6	84	(Italy) Riccardo Russo	All
Team MTM Racing	Yamaha	Yamaha YZF-R6	52	(Belgium) Gauthier Duwelz	1–3, 5–10
Team MTM Racing	Yamaha	Yamaha YZF-R6	92	(Australia) Adrian Nestorovic	All
Team Riviera	Yamaha	Yamaha YZF-R6	17	(Italy) Stefano Casalotti	1, 3–4
Team PATA by Martini	Yamaha	Yamaha YZF-R6	13	(Italy) Luca salvadori	1, 3–4, 6–8
Team PATA by Martini	Yamaha	Yamaha YZF-R6	13	(Italy) Luca Salvadori	9–10
Team PATA by Martini	Yamaha	Yamaha YZF-R6	75	(Italy) Francesco Cocco	1–8
Team Trasimeno	Yamaha	Yamaha YZF-R6	10	(Spain) Nacho Calero	All
Team Trasimeno	Yamaha	Yamaha YZF-R6	66	(South Africa) Jonathan Willcox	All
Team Trasimeno	Yamaha	Yamaha YZF-R6	75	(Italy) Francesco Cocco	9–10
Technic Racing	Yamaha	Yamaha YZF-R6	100	(France) Thibaut Gourin	10
TK Racing Slovakia	Yamaha	Yamaha YZF-R6	19	(Slovakia) Tomáš Krajči	1–3
TK Racing Slovakia	Yamaha	Yamaha YZF-R6	91	(Slovakia) Lukáš Jasenský	6

Key
Regular rider
Wildcard rider
Replacement rider

- All entries used Pirelli tyres.

== Championship standings ==
=== Riders' standings ===
Pos	Rider	Bike	IMO (Italy)	ASS (Netherlands)	MNZ (Italy)	MIS (San Marino)	ARA (Spain)	BRN (Czech Republic)	SIL (United Kingdom)	NÜR (Germany)	POR (Portugal)	MAG (France)	Pts
1	(Netherlands) Michael Van Der Mark	Honda	3	1	4	1	2	1	2	1	1	1	219
2	(Italy) Riccardo Russo	Yamaha	1	5	1	2	1	3	1	2	2	2	207
3	(Belgium) Gauthier Duwelz	Yamaha	10	3	2		3	2	Ret	Ret	4	9	98
4	(Denmark) Alex Schacht	Honda	21	6	8	Ret	12	4	4	9	6	6	75
5	(Australia) Adrian Nestorovic	Yamaha	17	9	Ret	6	5	7	6	5	3	Ret	74
6	(Italy) Franco Morbidelli	Yamaha	7		9	15		6	7	3	5	5	74
7	(Italy) Luca Vitali	Yamaha	19	7	5	4	7	12	9	10	9	10	72
8	(Italy) Christian Gamarino	Kawasaki	9	Ret	12	3	10	8	8	Ret	7	13	61
9	(Spain) Nacho Calero	Yamaha	2	2	6	18	Ret	18	12	18	11	20	61
10	(Switzerland) Bastien Chesaux	Honda	6	25	3	Ret	Ret		5	4	Ret	7	59
11	(Italy) Francesco Cocco	Yamaha	Ret	24	27	5	4	5	Ret	15	Ret	23	36
12	(Switzerland) Sebastian Suchet	Honda	18	11	18	21	8	10	10	21	13	8	36
13	(Italy) Riccardo Cecchini	Triumph	22	18	Ret		15						33
13	(Italy) Riccardo Cecchini	Honda						14	Ret	7	8	4	33
14	(Luxembourg) Christophe Ponsson	Kawasaki	Ret	14	13	12	11	11	13	Ret	12	12	30
15	(France) Stéphane Egea	Yamaha	5	4	Ret							22	24
16	(Netherlands) Tony Coveña	Kawasaki	16	10	7	8	18	WD					23
17	(France) Mathieu Marchal	Yamaha	Ret	21	Ret	10	DNS					3	22
18	(Australia) Matt Davies	Kawasaki	13	20	10	23	6	Ret	14	22	Ret	15	22
19	(United Kingdom) Lee Jackson	Kawasaki							3			11	21
20	(Switzerland) Robin Mulhauser	Yamaha	11	15	26	17	Ret	17	11	Ret	10	Ret	17
21	(Italy) Nicola Jr. Morrentino	Yamaha	4		14								15
22	(Italy) Stefano Casalotti	Yamaha	8		17	9							15
23	(Germany) Marvin Fritz	Kawasaki	12	13	25	14	13						12
24	(Australia) Corey Snowsill	Yamaha	29	Ret	16	13	9	19	DNS				11
24	(Australia) Corey Snowsill	Kawasaki								16	15	27	11
25	(Australia) Mike Jones	Yamaha								6	16		10
26	(Italy) Filippo Benini	Yamaha	Ret		11	11							10
27	(Italy) Federico Monti	Suzuki				7							9
28	(Netherlands) Wayne Tessels	Suzuki		8									8
29	(Austria) Marco Nekvasil	Yamaha								8		17	8
30	(Romania) Mircea Vrajitoru	Yamaha	14	Ret	23	25	14	Ret	Ret	12	Ret		8
31	(Italy) Ferruccio Lamborghini	Honda						9					7
32	(Italy) Luca Salvadori	Yamaha	20		21	Ret		15	Ret	14	14	14	7
33	(France) Richard De Tournay	Kawasaki	30	22	Ret	20	16	13	DSQ	13		Ret	6
34	(Croatia) Tedy Bašić	Yamhaa	Ret		20	16		Ret		11			5
35	(Netherlands) Koen Zeelen	Honda	26	12	28	19	17						4
36	(Slovakia) Tomáš Krajči	Yamaha	15	17	WD								1
37	(Italy) Roberto Mercandelli	Yamaha	24		15								1
38	(New Zealand) Jake Lewis	Kawasaki						22	15	20	17	28	1
	(Netherlands) Davy Thoonen	Yamaha		16									0
	(South Africa) Jonathan Willcox	Yamaha	27	Ret	19	Ret	19	16	DNS	19	Ret	30	0
	(France) Hugo Clere	Yamaha							DNS			16	0
	(Germany) Marc Buchner	Yamaha								17			0
	(France) Morgan Berchet	Yamaha										18	0
	(United Kingdom) Josh Simpson	Triumph	Ret	19	22	Ret							0
	(France) Thibaut Gourin	Yamaha										19	0
	(Czech Republic) Jiri Klejch	Yamaha						20					0
	(Slovakia) Lukáš Jasenský	Yamaha						21					0
	(Switzerland) Philippe Von Gunten	Kawasaki										21	0
	(Italy) Francesco Cavalli	Yamaha	23		24	22							0
	(Portugal) Ruben Nogueira	Yamaha	DNS	23									0
	(Croatia) Renato Novosel	Honda						23					0
	(Italy) Nicolas Stizza	Yamaha				24							0
	(United Kingdom) Alexander Olsen	Triumph										24	0
	(Italy) Emanuele Viglieno	Yamaha	25										0
	(France) Kevin Szalai	Yamaha										25	0
	(France) Anthony Dumont	Yamaha										26	0
	(United Kingdom) Tom Weeden	Triumph	28										0
	(Switzerland) Jeremy Ayer	Honda										29	0
	(Italy) Gennaro Antonio Romano	Yamaha	Ret										0
	(Italy) Alessandro Nocco	Kawasaki										Ret	0
	(Spain) Javier Alviz	Kawasaki										Ret	0
Pos	Rider	Bike	IMO (Italy)	ASS (Netherlands)	MNZ (Italy)	MIS (San Marino)	ARA (Spain)	BRN (Czech Republic)	SIL (United Kingdom)	NÜR (Germany)	POR (Portugal)	MAG (France)	Pts

Colour	Result
Gold	Winner
Silver	Second place
Bronze	Third place
Green	Points classification
Blue	Non-points classification
Blue	Non-classified finish (NC)
Purple	Retired, not classified (Ret)
Red	Did not qualify (DNQ)
Red	Did not pre-qualify (DNPQ)
Black	Disqualified (DSQ)
White	Did not start (DNS)
White	Withdrew (WD)
White	Race cancelled (C)
Blank	Did not practice (DNP)
Blank	Did not arrive (DNA)
Blank	Excluded (EX)

=== Constructors' standings ===
Pos	Constructor	IMO (Italy)	ASS (Netherlands)	MNZ (Italy)	MIS (San Marino)	ARA (Spain)	BRN (Czech Republic)	SIL (United Kingdom)	NÜR (Germany)	POR (Portugal)	MAG (France)	Pts
1	(Japan) Honda	3	1	3	1	2	1	2	1	1	1	222
2	(Japan) Yamaha	1	2	1	2	1	2	1	2	2	2	220
3	(Japan) Kawasaki	9	10	7	3	6	8	3	13	7	11	89
4	(Japan) Suzuki		8		7							17
5	(United Kingdom) Triumph	22	18	22	Ret	15					24	1
Pos	Constructor	IMO (Italy)	ASS (Netherlands)	MNZ (Italy)	MIS (San Marino)	ARA (Spain)	BRN (Czech Republic)	SIL (United Kingdom)	NÜR (Germany)	POR (Portugal)	MAG (France)	Pts
