= Morgan Berchet =

French motorcycle racer (born 1994)

- Nationality: French
- Born: 2 March 1994 (age 32); Annecy, France
- Current team: Team PMR
- Bike number: 63

Morgan Berchet (born 2 March 1994) is a Grand Prix motorcycle racer from France. He races in the French Superbike Championship aboard a Yamaha YZF-R1.

== Career statistics ==
2009- 9th, French 125cc Championship #163 Honda RS125R
2010- 5th, French 125cc Championship #163 Honda RS125R
2011-
2012- 4th, French 600 Trophy #63 Yamaha YZF-R6
2012 - NC, European Superstock 600 Championship, Yamaha YZF-R6
2013- 1st, French 600 Trophy #63 Yamaha YZF-R6
2013 - NC, European Superstock 600 Championship, Yamaha YZF-R6
2014- 6th, French Supersport Championship #63 Yamaha YZF-R6
2015- 8th, French Supersport Championship #63 Yamaha YZF-R6
2016- 8th, Endurance FIM World Cup #33 Kawasaki ZX-10R
2016- 16th, French Superbike Championship #33 Kawasaki ZX-10R
2017- 8th, French Superbike Championship #63 Kawasaki ZX-10R
2018- French Superbike Championship #63 Yamaha YZF-R1

=== By season ===
Season	Class	Motorcycle	Team	Number	Race	Win	Podium	Pole	FLap	Pts	Plcd
2010	125cc	Honda	Xtreme Racing Team	83	1	0	0	0	0	0	NC
Total					**1**	**0**	**0**	**0**	**0**	**0**	

==== Races by year ====
Year	Class	Bike	1	2	3	4	5	6	7	8	9	10	11	12	13	14	15	16	17	Pos.	Pts
2010	125cc	Honda	QAT	SPA	FRA; 26	ITA	GBR	NED	CAT	GER	CZE	INP	RSM	ARA	JPN	MAL	AUS	POR	VAL	NC	0

=== European Superstock 600 ===
==== Races by year ====
(key) (Races in bold indicate pole position, races in italics indicate fastest lap)

Year	Bike	1	2	3	4	5	6	7	8	9	10	Pos	Pts
2012	Yamaha	IMO	ASS	MNZ	MIS	ARA	BRN	SIL	NÜR	POR	MAG; 18	NC	0
2013	Yamaha	ARA	ASS	MNZ	POR	IMO	SIL1	SIL2	NÜR	MAG	JER; Ret	NC	0
