= 2013 European Superstock 600 Championship =

Motorcycle racing series

2013 European Superstock 600 Championship
Previous:	2012	Next:	2014
Support series: Superbike World Championship; Supersport World Championship; FIM Superstock 1000 Cup; European Junior Cup

The 2013 European Superstock 600 Championship was the ninth season of the European Superstock 600 Championship. Italian Franco Morbidelli was proclaimed champion after winning two races, he beat out fellow Italians Alessandro Nocco and Christian Gamarino to the title.

== Race calendar and results ==
Round		Country	Circuit	Date	Pole position	Fastest lap	Winning rider	Winning team
1		Spain	Motorland Aragón	13 April	(Belgium) Gauthier Duwelz	(Netherlands) Tony Coveña	(Belgium) Gauthier Duwelz	MTM Racing Team
2		Netherlands	TT Circuit Assen	27 April	(Belgium) Gauthier Duwelz	(Italy) Christian Gamarino	(Belgium) Gauthier Duwelz	MTM–MVR Racing Team
3		Italy	Autodromo Nazionale Monza	11 May	(Italy) Luca Salvadori	(Italy) Nicola Jr. Morrentino	(Italy) Nicola Jr. Morrentino	Team Trasimeno
4		Portugal	Algarve International Circuit	8 June	(Australia) Adrian Nestorovic	(Netherlands) Tony Coveña	(Italy) Franco Morbidelli	San Carlo Team Italia
5		Italy	Autodromo Enzo e Dino Ferrari	29 June	(Italy) Franco Morbidelli	(Italy) Christian Gamarino	(Italy) Alessandro Nocco	San Carlo Team Italia
6	R1	United Kingdom	Silverstone Circuit	3 August	(Italy) Alessandro Nocco	(Italy) Alessandro Nocco	(Italy) Alessandro Nocco	San Carlo Team Italia
6	R2	United Kingdom	Silverstone Circuit	4 August	(Italy) Alessandro Nocco	(Switzerland) Bastien Chesaux	(Italy) Christian Gamarino	Team Goeleven
7		Germany	Nürburgring	31 August	(Italy) Christian Gamarino	(Italy) Alessandro Nocco	(Italy) Franco Morbidelli	San Carlo Team Italia
8		France	Circuit de Nevers Magny-Cours	5 October	(Italy) Alessandro Nocco	(Italy) Alessandro Nocco	(Italy) Alessandro Nocco	San Carlo Team Italia
9		Spain	Circuito de Jerez	19 October	(Italy) Franco Morbidelli	(Italy) Franco Morbidelli	(United Kingdom) Kyle Smith	Agro-On Racedays Honda

== Entry list ==
Team	Constructor	Motorcycle	No.	Rider	Rounds
Agro-On Racedays Honda	Honda	Honda CBR600RR	3	(United Kingdom) Kyle Smith	7–9
Agro-On Racedays Honda	Honda	Honda CBR600RR	46	(Australia) Mike Jones	1–6
Agro-On Racedays Honda	Honda	Honda CBR600RR	58	(Austria) Lukas Wimmer	All
EAB Ten Kate Junior Team	Honda	Honda CBR600RR	8	(Switzerland) Bastien Chesaux	All
Itaba Moto	Honda	Honda CBR600RR	69	(Italy) Emanuele Pusceddu	3
JFA Performances	Honda	Honda CBR600RR	22	(France) Jean Francois Demoulin	1–3, 5–9
Schacht Racing SBK ONE	Honda	Honda CBR600RR	21	(Croatia) Alex Radmann	6
Schacht Racing SBK ONE	Honda	Honda CBR600RR	68	(United States) Brandon Kyee	1–3
Team Flathaug Racing	Honda	Honda CBR600RR	86	(Norway) Henning Flathaug	2, 7
Team Lorini	Honda	Honda CBR600RR	27	(Italy) Riccardo Cecchini	All
Techno Team	Honda	Honda CBR600RR	44	(Italy) Andrea Tucci	5
Tucci Racing Team	Honda	Honda CBR600RR	44	(Italy) Andrea Tucci	9
Bike Service R.T.	Kawasaki	Kawasaki ZX-6R	23	(Italy) Luca Salvadori	8
Halcourier MS Team	Kawasaki	Kawasaki ZX-6R	6	(Spain) Sergio Mora Barrio	9
Kawasaki DMC-Lorenzini Team	Kawasaki	Kawasaki ZX-6R	61	(Russia) Alexey Ivanov	1–4
MJJ Motorsport	Kawasaki	Kawasaki ZX-6R	97	(United Kingdom) Josh Corner	6
Montaze Broz Racing Team	Kawasaki	Kawasaki ZX-6R	2	(Czech Republic) Jiri Klech	9
Montaze Broz Racing Team	Kawasaki	Kawasaki ZX-6R	47	(Czech Republic) Tomáš Vavrouš	1–8
Motorrad Mayer	Kawasaki	Kawasaki ZX-6R	95	(Austria) Julian Mayer	All
Nito Racing	Kawasaki	Kawasaki ZX-6R	99	(Netherlands) Tony Coveña	All
San Carlo Team Italia	Kawasaki	Kawasaki ZX-6R	12	(Italy) Franco Morbidelli	All
San Carlo Team Italia	Kawasaki	Kawasaki ZX-6R	81	(Italy) Alessandro Nocco	All
Team GoEleven	Kawasaki	Kawasaki ZX-6R	18	(Italy) Christian Gamarino	All
Lexware-SKM by Knobi.at	MV Agusta	MV Agusta F3 675	34	(Austria) Marco Nekvasil	1–6
NIWA Racing Team	Suzuki	Suzuki GSX-R600	74	(Netherlands) Rob Hartog	2
Suriano Racing Team	Suzuki	Suzuki GSX-R600	70	(Italy) Luca Vitali	All
Suriano Racing Team	Suzuki	Suzuki GSX-R600	75	(Italy) Francesco Cocco	1–3
Waynes Racingteam	Suzuki	Suzuki GSX-R600	77	(Netherlands) Wayne Tessels	All
Motomarket Racing	Triumph	Triumph Daytona 675	17	(Finland) Eemeli Lahti	2, 6–7
Profile Racing	Triumph	Triumph Daytona 675	20	(United Kingdom) Luke Stapleford	6
Schacht Racing SBK ONE	Triumph	Triumph Daytona 675	21	(Croatia) Alex Radmann	7
AGR Racing Team	Yamaha	Yamaha YZF-R6	16	(Germany) Jan Bühn	9
Bike Center	Yamaha	Yamaha YZF-R6	25	(Italy) Federico Monti	5
Bike e Motor Racing Team	Yamaha	Yamaha YZF-R6	45	(Croatia) Tedy Bašić	1–3
Bike e Motor Racing Team	Yamaha	Yamaha YZF-R6	73	(Italy) Manuele Tatasciore	3
Bike e Motor Racing Team	Yamaha	Yamaha YZF-R6	73	(Italy) Manuele Tatasciore	4–5
BYRT by Extreme Racing	Yamaha	Yamaha YZF-R6	127	(Italy) Luigi Brignoli	5
Coutelle Racing Team	Yamaha	Yamaha YZF-R6	88	(France) Mathieu Marchal	All
G.B. Racing	Yamaha	Yamaha YZF-R6	112	(United Kingdom) Luke Mossey	6
Gradaracorse Racing Team	Yamaha	Yamaha YZF-R6	14	(Italy) Massimiliano Spedale	5
Hagn-SKM by Knobi.at	Yamaha	Yamaha YZF-R6	9	(Switzerland) Dominic Schmitter	1–8
Hagn-SKM by Knobi.at	Yamaha	Yamaha YZF-R6	50	(Austria) Lukas Trautmann	9
Leu Racing Team	Yamaha	Yamaha YZF-R6	19	(Switzerland) Bryan Leu	8
Lexware-SKM by Knobi.at	Yamaha	Yamaha YZF-R6	34	(Austria) Marco Nekvasil	7–9
MTM-MVR Racing Team	Yamaha	Yamaha YZF-R6	52	(Belgium) Gauthier Duwelz	All
MTM-MVR Racing Team	Yamaha	Yamaha YZF-R6	71	(Switzerland) Robin Mulhauser	All
MTM-MVR Racing Team	Yamaha	Yamaha YZF-R6	92	(Australia) Adrian Nestorovic	All
Niki Tuuli Racing	Yamaha	Yamaha YZF-R6	36	(Finland) Niki Tuuli	1–3, 5–9
Niki Tuuli Racing	Yamaha	Yamaha YZF-R6	54	(Finland) Joel Vinnikainen	7
PATA by Martini Team	Yamaha	Yamaha YZF-R6	4	(Italy) Thomas Cicco	9
PATA by Martini Team	Yamaha	Yamaha YZF-R6	23	(Italy) Luca Salvadori	2–7, 9
PATA by Martini Team	Yamaha	Yamaha YZF-R6	41	(Italy) Federico D'Annunzio	All
Rosso e Nero	Yamaha	Yamaha YZF-R6	93	(Italy) Roberto Mercandelli	3, 5
SlMoteur	Yamaha	Yamaha YZF-R6	11	(France) Hugo Clere	8–9
Team OGP	Yamaha	Yamaha YZF-R6	96	(Germany) Dominik Engelen	7
Team PMR	Yamaha	Yamaha YZF-R6	63	(France) Morgan Berchet	9
Team Trasimeno	Yamaha	Yamaha YZF-R6	24	(Italy) Simone Pellegrini	All
Team Trasimeno	Yamaha	Yamaha YZF-R6	26	(Italy) Nicolas Stizza	1–5, 8
Team Trasimeno	Yamaha	Yamaha YZF-R6	53	(Italy) Nicola Jr. Morrentino	All
UP Racing	Yamaha	Yamaha YZF-R6	10	(France) Thibaut Gourin	8
VFT Racing	Yamaha	Yamaha YZF-R6	7	(Italy) Stefano Casalotti	All
VFT Racing	Yamaha	Yamaha YZF-R6	75	(Italy) Francesco Cocco	7
Yakhnich Motorsport	Yamaha	Yamaha YZF-R6	80	(Spain) Dakota Mamola	All

Key
Regular rider
Wildcard rider
Replacement rider

- All entries used Pirelli tyres.

== Championship standings ==
Pos	Rider	Bike	ARA (Spain)	ASS (Netherlands)	MNZ (Italy)	POR (Portugal)	IMO (Italy)	SIL (United Kingdom)		NÜR (Germany)	MAG (France)	JER (Spain)	Pts
1	(Italy) Franco Morbidelli	Kawasaki	6	7	6	1	**2**	4	14	1	2	**2**	154
2	(Italy) Alessandro Nocco	Kawasaki	16	12	5	6	1	**1**	**23**	2	**1**	3	136
3	(Italy) Christian Gamarino	Kawasaki	7	5	20	5	3	2	1	**3**	3	11	129
4	(Switzerland) Bastien Chesaux	Honda	3	3	8	3	8	3	2	18	4	4	126
5	(Belgium) Gauthier Duwelz	Yamaha	**1**	**1**	9	2	9	NC	DNS	4	11	19	102
6	(Netherlands) Tony Coveña	Kawasaki	2	6	7	4	4	6	Ret	11	15	Ret	81
7	(Switzerland) Robin Mulhauser	Yamaha	4	9	12	8	18	5	3	10	14	Ret	67
8	(Australia) Adrian Nestorovic	Yamaha	5	2	Ret	**Ret**	14	8	4	7	DNS		63
9	(Italy) Luca Salvadori	Yamaha		14	**2**	11	6	7	5	Ret	DNS	Ret	57
10	(Italy) Stefano Casalotti	Yamaha	8	10	15	12	10	9	10	12	DNS	5	53
11	(Italy) Nicola Jr. Morrentino	Yamaha	18	8	1	16	5	17	16	DNS	12	17	48
12	(United Kingdom) Kyle Smith	Honda								6	7	1	44
13	(Switzerland) Dominic Schmitter	Yamaha	9	16	10	15	13	13	6	8	DNS		38
14	(Finland) Niki Tuuli	Yamaha	12	DNS	4		Ret	10	19	5	Ret	14	36
15	(Netherlands) Wayne Tessels	Suzuki	10	4	Ret	Ret	DNS	11	21	9	13	23	34
16	(Italy) Luca Vitali	Suzuki	13	Ret	11	9	12	12	13	15	Ret	10	33
17	(Italy) Federico D'Annunzio	Yamaha	14	Ret	13	13	16	19	11	17	5	12	28
18	(Austria) Marco Nekvasil	MV Agusta	11	Ret	19	19	Ret	DNS	DNS				28
18	(Austria) Marco Nekvasil	Yamaha								13	6	6	28
19	(Spain) Dakota Mamola	Yamaha	17	21	17	20	11	16	9	14	10	8	28
20	(France) Mathieu Marchal	Yamaha	Ret	11	Ret	7	DNS	24	8	16	DNS		22
21	(Italy) Manuel Tatasciore	Yamaha			3	18	23						16
22	(Italy) Riccardo Cecchini	Honda	Ret	Ret	18	14	19	18	7	19	16	16	11
23	(Austria) Lukas Trautmann	Yamaha										7	9
24	(Italy) Roberto Mercandelli	Yamaha			DSQ		7						9
25	(Czech Republic) Tomáš Vavrouš	Kawasaki	Ret	13	14	21	DNS	21	12	Ret	20		9
26	(France) Thibaut Gourin	Yamaha									8		8
27	(France) Hugo Clere	Yamaha									9	15	8
28	(Australia) Mike Jones	Honda	15	18	24	10	Ret	15	20				8
29	(Italy) Andrea Tucci	Honda					Ret					9	7
30	(Germany) Jan Bühn	Yamaha										13	3
31	(United Kingdom) Luke Stapleford	Triumph						14	Ret				2
32	(Austria) Julian Mayer	Kawasaki	21	20	22		20	22	15	22	Ret		1
33	(Italy) Massimiliano Spedale	Yamaha					15						1
34	(Croatia) Tedy Bašić	Yamaha	Ret	15	16								1
	(United Kingdom) Luke Mossey	Yamaha						Ret	17				0
	(Switzerland) Bryan Leu	Yamaha									17		0
	(Austria) Lukas Wimmer	Honda	Ret	Ret	Ret	24	DNS	25	18	Ret		18	0
	(France) Jean Francois Demoulin	Honda	25	26	26		24	27	24	25	18	20	0
	(Russia) Alexey Ivanov	Kawasaki	20	24	25	23							0
	(Finland) Eemeli Lahti	Triumph		Ret				20	22	Ret			0
	(Italy) Francesco Cocco	Suzuki	24	22	27								0
	(Italy) Francesco Cocco	Yamaha								20			0
	(Norway) Henning Flathaug	Honda		23						21			0
	(Czech Republic) Jiri Klejch	Kawasaki										21	0
	(Italy) Luigi Brignoli	Yamaha					22						0
	(Spain) Sergio Mora Barrio	Kawasaki										22	0
	(United States) Brandon Kyee	Honda	23	25	23								0
	(Croatia) Alex Radmann	Honda						26	Ret				0
	(Croatia) Alex Radmann	Triumph								23			0
	(Finland) Joel Vinnikainen	Yamaha								24			0
	(Italy) Thomas Cicco	Yamaha										24	0
	(United Kingdom) Josh Corner	Kawasaki						Ret	25				0
	(Italy) Emanuele Pusceddu	Honda			Ret								0
	(France) Morgan Berchet	Yamaha										Ret	0
	(Italy) Federico Monti	Yamaha					DNS						
	(Netherlands) Rob Hartog	Suzuki		WD									
Pos	Rider	Bike	ARA (Spain)	ASS (Netherlands)	MNZ (Italy)	POR (Portugal)	IMO (Italy)	SIL (United Kingdom)		NÜR (Germany)	MAG (France)	JER (Spain)	Pts

Colour	Result
Gold	Winner
Silver	Second place
Bronze	Third place
Green	Points classification
Blue	Non-points classification
Blue	Non-classified finish (NC)
Purple	Retired, not classified (Ret)
Red	Did not qualify (DNQ)
Red	Did not pre-qualify (DNPQ)
Black	Disqualified (DSQ)
White	Did not start (DNS)
White	Withdrew (WD)
White	Race cancelled (C)
Blank	Did not practice (DNP)
Blank	Did not arrive (DNA)
Blank	Excluded (EX)

**Bold** – Pole
Italics – Fastest Lap
