= 2009 San Marino and Rimini Riviera motorcycle Grand Prix =

2009 San Marino and Rimini Riviera Grand Prix
Race details
- Race 13 of 17 races in the 2009 Grand Prix motorcycle racing season
- Date: 6 September 2009
- Official name: Gran Premio Cinzano di San Marino e Riviera di Rimini
- Location: Misano World Circuit
- Course: Permanent racing facility; 4.226 km (2.626 mi)

MotoGP
Pole position
- Rider: (Italy) Valentino Rossi
- Time: 1:34.338
Fastest lap
- Rider: (Italy) Valentino Rossi
- Time: 1:34.746
Podium
- First: (Italy) Valentino Rossi
- Second: (Spain) Jorge Lorenzo
- Third: (Spain) Dani Pedrosa

250cc
Pole position
- Rider: (Japan) Hiroshi Aoyama
- Time: 1:38.867
Fastest lap
- Rider: (Japan) Hiroshi Aoyama
- Time: 1:39.039
Podium
- First: (Spain) Héctor Barberá
- Second: (Italy) Mattia Pasini
- Third: (Spain) Álvaro Bautista

125cc
Pole position
- Rider: (United Kingdom) Bradley Smith
- Time: 1:43.727
Fastest lap
- Rider: (Spain) Pol Espargaró
- Time: 1:43.613
Podium
- First: (Spain) Julián Simón
- Second: (Spain) Nicolás Terol
- Third: (United Kingdom) Bradley Smith

The 2009 San Marino and Rimini Riviera motorcycle Grand Prix was the thirteenth round of the 2009 Grand Prix motorcycle racing season. It took place on the weekend of 4–6 September 2009 at the Misano World Circuit. The MotoGP race was won by Valentino Rossi who extended his lead in the championship to 30 points.

== MotoGP classification ==
Pos.	No.	Rider	Team	Manufacturer	Laps	Time/Retired	Grid	Points
1	46	(Italy) Valentino Rossi	Fiat Yamaha Team	Yamaha	28	44:32.882	1	25
2	99	(Spain) Jorge Lorenzo	Fiat Yamaha Team	Yamaha	28	+2.416	3	20
3	3	(Spain) Dani Pedrosa	Repsol Honda Team	Honda	28	+12.400	2	16
4	4	(Italy) Andrea Dovizioso	Repsol Honda Team	Honda	28	+26.330	8	13
5	65	(Italy) Loris Capirossi	Rizla Suzuki MotoGP	Suzuki	28	+26.539	10	11
6	24	(Spain) Toni Elías	San Carlo Honda Gresini	Honda	28	+28.286	4	10
7	36	(Finland) Mika Kallio	Ducati Marlboro Team	Ducati	28	+30.184	11	9
8	33	(Italy) Marco Melandri	Hayate Racing Team	Kawasaki	28	+31.757	12	8
9	7	(Australia) Chris Vermeulen	Rizla Suzuki MotoGP	Suzuki	28	+31.909	13	7
10	52	(United Kingdom) James Toseland	Monster Yamaha Tech 3	Yamaha	28	+38.347	14	6
11	44	(Spain) Aleix Espargaró	Pramac Racing	Ducati	28	+46.673	15	5
12	14	(France) Randy de Puniet	LCR Honda MotoGP	Honda	28	+52.041	9	4
13	88	(Italy) Niccolò Canepa	Pramac Racing	Ducati	28	+1:03.198	16	3
14	41	(Hungary) Gábor Talmácsi	Scot Racing Team MotoGP	Honda	28	+1:22.347	17	2
Ret	15	(San Marino) Alex de Angelis	San Carlo Honda Gresini	Honda	0	Collision	7	
Ret	5	(United States) Colin Edwards	Monster Yamaha Tech 3	Yamaha	0	Collision	5	
Ret	69	(United States) Nicky Hayden	Ducati Marlboro Team	Ducati	0	Collision	6	

== 250 cc classification ==
Pos.	No.	Rider	Manufacturer	Laps	Time/Retired	Grid	Points
1	40	(Spain) Héctor Barberá	Aprilia	26	43:23.353	2	25
2	75	(Italy) Mattia Pasini	Aprilia	26	+0.040	4	20
3	19	(Spain) Álvaro Bautista	Aprilia	26	+1.691	8	16
4	4	(Japan) Hiroshi Aoyama	Honda	26	+1.697	1	13
5	63	(France) Mike Di Meglio	Aprilia	26	+1.921	5	11
6	16	(France) Jules Cluzel	Aprilia	26	+9.202	13	10
7	6	(Spain) Alex Debón	Aprilia	26	+10.483	6	9
8	35	(Italy) Raffaele De Rosa	Honda	26	+11.360	16	8
9	55	(Spain) Héctor Faubel	Honda	26	+18.953	7	7
10	12	(Switzerland) Thomas Lüthi	Aprilia	26	+24.480	14	6
11	17	(Czech Republic) Karel Abraham	Aprilia	26	+24.680	11	5
12	48	(Japan) Shoya Tomizawa	Honda	26	+51.521	17	4
13	25	(Italy) Alex Baldolini	Aprilia	26	+52.474	15	3
14	53	(France) Valentin Debise	Honda	26	+1:11.675	18	2
15	11	(Hungary) Balázs Németh	Aprilia	26	+1:15.515	19	1
16	7	(Spain) Axel Pons	Aprilia	26	+1:15.666	20	
17	56	(Russia) Vladimir Leonov	Aprilia	25	+1 lap	22	
18	10	(Hungary) Imre Tóth	Aprilia	25	+1 lap	23	
19	77	(Spain) Aitor Rodríguez	Aprilia	25	+1 lap	25	
Ret	14	(Thailand) Ratthapark Wilairot	Honda	21	Accident	10	
Ret	15	(Italy) Roberto Locatelli	Gilera	20	Retirement	9	
Ret	54	(United Kingdom) Toby Markham	Aprilia	15	Retirement	24	
Ret	58	(Italy) Marco Simoncelli	Gilera	12	Accident	3	
Ret	8	(Switzerland) Bastien Chesaux	Honda	3	Accident	21	
Ret	52	(Czech Republic) Lukáš Pešek	Aprilia	2	Retirement	12	
OFFICIAL 250cc REPORT

== 125 cc classification ==
Pos.	No.	Rider	Manufacturer	Laps	Time/Retired	Grid	Points
1	60	(Spain) Julián Simón	Aprilia	23	40:15.301	2	25
2	18	(Spain) Nicolás Terol	Aprilia	23	+0.573	4	20
3	38	(United Kingdom) Bradley Smith	Aprilia	23	+5.474	1	16
4	93	(Spain) Marc Márquez	KTM	23	+9.378	7	13
5	11	(Germany) Sandro Cortese	Derbi	23	+9.665	10	11
6	17	(Germany) Stefan Bradl	Aprilia	23	+11.755	9	10
7	24	(Italy) Simone Corsi	Aprilia	23	+23.044	8	9
8	6	(Spain) Joan Olivé	Derbi	23	+26.936	18	8
9	94	(Germany) Jonas Folger	Aprilia	23	+32.851	25	7
10	99	(United Kingdom) Danny Webb	Aprilia	23	+34.439	13	6
11	88	(Austria) Michael Ranseder	Aprilia	23	+34.733	17	5
12	7	(Spain) Efrén Vázquez	Derbi	23	+35.763	11	4
13	51	(Italy) Riccardo Moretti	Aprilia	23	+35.853	26	3
14	8	(Italy) Lorenzo Zanetti	Aprilia	23	+39.937	20	2
15	77	(Switzerland) Dominique Aegerter	Derbi	23	+39.942	24	1
16	14	(France) Johann Zarco	Aprilia	23	+40.110	15	
17	35	(Switzerland) Randy Krummenacher	Aprilia	23	+59.051	23	
18	69	(Czech Republic) Lukáš Šembera	Aprilia	23	+59.100	19	
19	61	(Italy) Luigi Morciano	Aprilia	23	+1:00.236	16	
20	73	(Japan) Takaaki Nakagami	Aprilia	23	+1:01.191	22	
21	39	(Spain) Luis Salom	Aprilia	23	+1:02.848	31	
22	16	(United States) Cameron Beaubier	KTM	23	+1:11.814	28	
23	53	(Netherlands) Jasper Iwema	Honda	23	+1:11.933	33	
24	87	(Italy) Luca Marconi	Aprilia	23	+1:12.053	32	
25	65	(Italy) Gabriele Ferro	Aprilia	23	+1:14.596	29	
26	70	(Slovakia) Jakub Jantulík	Aprilia	23	+1:28.731	34	
27	10	(Italy) Luca Vitali	Aprilia	23	+1:29.309	36	
28	21	(Czech Republic) Jakub Kornfeil	Loncin	23	+1:29.916	35	
29	62	(Italy) Alessandro Tonucci	Aprilia	22	+1 lap	21	
Ret	29	(Italy) Andrea Iannone	Aprilia	22	Collision	3	
Ret	44	(Spain) Pol Espargaró	Derbi	22	Collision	6	
Ret	71	(Japan) Tomoyoshi Koyama	Loncin	16	Retirement	27	
Ret	12	(Spain) Esteve Rabat	Aprilia	15	Retirement	12	
Ret	32	(Italy) Lorenzo Savadori	Aprilia	13	Accident	30	
Ret	45	(United Kingdom) Scott Redding	Aprilia	5	Retirement	14	
Ret	33	(Spain) Sergio Gadea	Aprilia	0	Accident	5	
OFFICIAL 125cc REPORT

== Championship standings after the race (MotoGP) ==
Below are the standings for the top five riders and constructors after round thirteen has concluded.

Riders' Championship standings

Pos.	Rider	Points
1	(Italy) Valentino Rossi	237
2	(Spain) Jorge Lorenzo	207
3	(Spain) Dani Pedrosa	157
4	(Australia) Casey Stoner	150
5	(Italy) Andrea Dovizioso	133

Constructors' Championship standings

Pos.	Constructor	Points
1	(Japan) Yamaha	305
2	(Japan) Honda	220
3	(Italy) Ducati	191
4	(Japan) Suzuki	120
5	(Japan) Kawasaki	87

- Note: Only the top five positions are included for both sets of standings.

Previous race: 2009 Indianapolis Grand Prix	FIM Grand Prix World Championship; 2009 season	Next race: 2009 Portuguese Grand Prix
Previous race: 2008 San Marino Grand Prix	San Marino and Rimini Riviera motorcycle Grand Prix	Next race: 2010 San Marino Grand Prix
