= 2009 Czech Republic motorcycle Grand Prix =

2009 Czech Republic Grand Prix
Race details
- Race 11 of 17 races in the 2009 Grand Prix motorcycle racing season
- Date: 16 August 2009
- Official name: Cardion AB Grand Prix České republiky
- Location: Brno Circuit
- Course: Permanent racing facility; 5.403 km (3.357 mi)

MotoGP
Pole position
- Rider: (Italy) Valentino Rossi
- Time: 1:56.145
Fastest lap
- Rider: (Spain) Jorge Lorenzo
- Time: 1:56.670
Podium
- First: (Italy) Valentino Rossi
- Second: (Spain) Dani Pedrosa
- Third: (Spain) Toni Elías

250cc
Pole position
- Rider: (Italy) Marco Simoncelli
- Time: 2:01.611
Fastest lap
- Rider: (Italy) Marco Simoncelli
- Time: 2:02.330
Podium
- First: (Italy) Marco Simoncelli
- Second: (Italy) Mattia Pasini
- Third: (Spain) Álvaro Bautista

125cc
Pole position
- Rider: (Italy) Andrea Iannone
- Time: 2:08.171
Fastest lap
- Rider: (Spain) Julián Simón
- Time: 2:08.640
Podium
- First: (Spain) Nicolás Terol
- Second: (Spain) Julián Simón
- Third: (Italy) Andrea Iannone

The 2009 Czech Republic motorcycle Grand Prix was the eleventh round of the 2009 Grand Prix motorcycle racing season. It took place on the weekend of 14–16 August 2009 at the Brno Circuit located in Brno. The MotoGP race was won by Valentino Rossi.

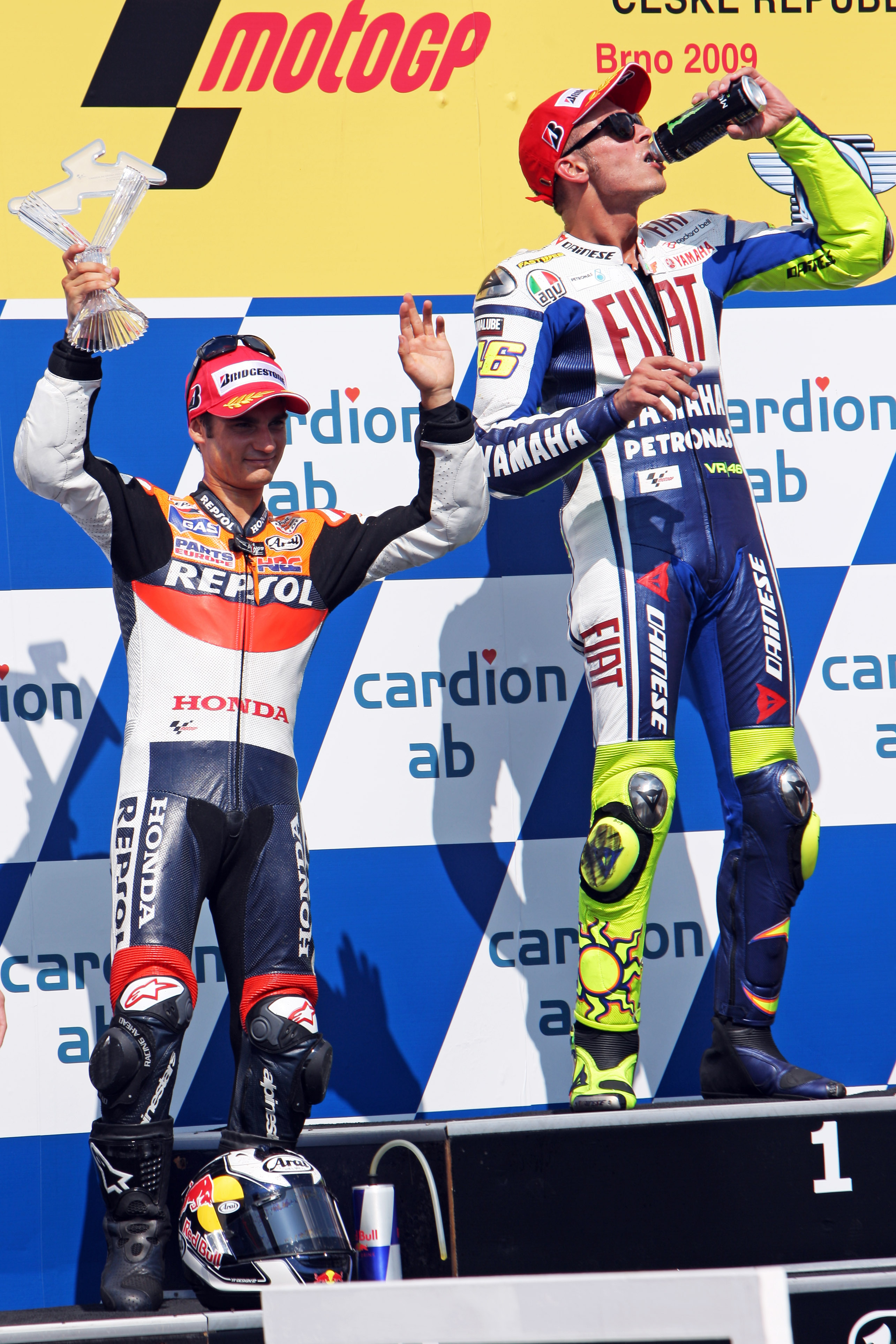
Dani Pedrosa and Valentino Rossi, celebrating on the podium after finishing second and first at the MotoGP race.

== MotoGP classification ==
Pos.	No.	Rider	Team	Manufacturer	Laps	Time/Retired	Grid	Points
1	46	(Italy) Valentino Rossi	Fiat Yamaha Team	Yamaha	22	43:08.991	1	25
2	3	(Spain) Dani Pedrosa	Repsol Honda Team	Honda	22	+11.766	3	20
3	24	(Spain) Toni Elías	San Carlo Honda Gresini	Honda	22	+20.756	4	16
4	4	(Italy) Andrea Dovizioso	Repsol Honda Team	Honda	22	+21.418	6	13
5	65	(Italy) Loris Capirossi	Rizla Suzuki MotoGP	Suzuki	22	+21.538	9	11
6	69	(United States) Nicky Hayden	Ducati Marlboro Team	Ducati	22	+25.544	8	10
7	5	(United States) Colin Edwards	Monster Yamaha Tech 3	Yamaha	22	+25.676	5	9
8	15	(San Marino) Alex de Angelis	San Carlo Honda Gresini	Honda	22	+34.109	7	8
9	52	(United Kingdom) James Toseland	Monster Yamaha Tech 3	Yamaha	22	+35.617	14	7
10	14	(France) Randy de Puniet	LCR Honda MotoGP	Honda	22	+39.824	13	6
11	7	(Australia) Chris Vermeulen	Rizla Suzuki MotoGP	Suzuki	22	+40.776	11	5
12	88	(Italy) Niccolò Canepa	Pramac Racing	Ducati	22	+50.661	12	4
13	41	(Hungary) Gábor Talmácsi	Scot Racing Team MotoGP	Honda	22	+59.188	17	3
Ret	36	(Finland) Mika Kallio	Ducati Marlboro Team	Ducati	20	Accident	10	
Ret	33	(Italy) Marco Melandri	Hayate Racing Team	Kawasaki	20	Accident	15	
Ret	99	(Spain) Jorge Lorenzo	Fiat Yamaha Team	Yamaha	17	Accident	2	
Ret	84	(Italy) Michel Fabrizio	Pramac Racing	Ducati	6	Retirement	16	

== 250 cc classification ==
Pos.	No.	Rider	Manufacturer	Laps	Time/Retired	Grid	Points
1	58	(Italy) Marco Simoncelli	Gilera	20	41:06.490	1	25
2	75	(Italy) Mattia Pasini	Aprilia	20	+0.684	7	20
3	19	(Spain) Álvaro Bautista	Aprilia	20	+4.381	8	16
4	4	(Japan) Hiroshi Aoyama	Honda	20	+8.746	2	13
5	15	(Italy) Roberto Locatelli	Gilera	20	+9.721	6	11
6	35	(Italy) Raffaele De Rosa	Honda	20	+10.870	9	10
7	40	(Spain) Héctor Barberá	Aprilia	20	+15.639	3	9
8	16	(France) Jules Cluzel	Aprilia	20	+18.411	14	8
9	63	(France) Mike Di Meglio	Aprilia	20	+18.563	5	7
10	55	(Spain) Héctor Faubel	Honda	20	+19.958	11	6
11	14	(Thailand) Ratthapark Wilairot	Honda	20	+20.084	12	5
12	52	(Czech Republic) Lukáš Pešek	Aprilia	20	+30.632	15	4
13	48	(Japan) Shoya Tomizawa	Honda	20	+37.118	16	3
14	11	(Hungary) Balázs Németh	Aprilia	20	+1:17.484	18	2
15	53	(France) Valentin Debise	Honda	20	+1:24.684	20	1
16	7	(Spain) Axel Pons	Aprilia	20	+1:25.132	19	
17	10	(Hungary) Imre Tóth	Aprilia	20	+1:46.925	22	
18	77	(Spain) Aitor Rodríguez	Aprilia	20	+1:52.465	24	
19	56	(Russia) Vladimir Leonov	Aprilia	20	+1:59.794	23	
Ret	8	(Switzerland) Bastien Chesaux	Honda	12	Accident	21	
Ret	6	(Spain) Alex Debón	Aprilia	9	Accident	4	
Ret	25	(Italy) Alex Baldolini	Aprilia	6	Accident	17	
Ret	54	(United Kingdom) Toby Markham	Aprilia	1	Accident	25	
Ret	12	(Switzerland) Thomas Lüthi	Aprilia	0	Accident	13	
Ret	17	(Czech Republic) Karel Abraham	Aprilia	0	Accident	10	
OFFICIAL 250cc REPORT

== 125 cc classification ==
Pos.	No.	Rider	Manufacturer	Laps	Time/Retired	Grid	Points
1	18	(Spain) Nicolás Terol	Aprilia	19	40:57.378	2	25
2	60	(Spain) Julian Simon	Aprilia	19	+0.168	4	20
3	29	(Italy) Andrea Iannone	Aprilia	19	+8.719	1	16
4	38	(United Kingdom) Bradley Smith	Aprilia	19	+12.443	5	13
5	44	(Spain) Pol Espargaró	Derbi	19	+16.006	8	11
6	11	(Germany) Sandro Cortese	Derbi	19	+16.066	3	10
7	17	(Germany) Stefan Bradl	Aprilia	19	+17.105	6	9
8	93	(Spain) Marc Márquez	KTM	19	+17.202	20	8
9	33	(Spain) Sergio Gadea	Aprilia	19	+17.223	7	7
10	6	(Spain) Joan Olivé	Derbi	19	+17.244	11	6
11	14	(France) Johann Zarco	Aprilia	19	+17.618	10	5
12	94	(Germany) Jonas Folger	Aprilia	19	+21.977	18	4
13	78	(Germany) Marcel Schrötter	Honda	19	+34.487	17	3
14	7	(Spain) Efrén Vázquez	Derbi	19	+34.512	9	2
15	45	(United Kingdom) Scott Redding	Aprilia	19	+41.558	22	1
16	99	(United Kingdom) Danny Webb	Aprilia	19	+43.098	15	
17	35	(Switzerland) Randy Krummenacher	Aprilia	19	+43.121	23	
18	77	(Switzerland) Dominique Aegerter	Derbi	19	+43.164	24	
19	73	(Japan) Takaaki Nakagami	Aprilia	19	+43.453	19	
20	88	(Austria) Michael Ranseder	Aprilia	19	+43.917	13	
21	71	(Japan) Tomoyoshi Koyama	Loncin	19	+50.710	33	
22	61	(Italy) Luigi Morciano	Aprilia	19	+1:09.976	26	
23	62	(Italy) Alessandro Tonucci	Aprilia	19	+1:10.633	27	
24	5	(France) Alexis Masbou	Loncin	19	+1:35.007	31	
25	10	(Italy) Luca Vitali	Aprilia	19	+1:39.485	34	
26	87	(Italy) Luca Marconi	Aprilia	19	+1:39.739	32	
27	86	(Czech Republic) Karel Pešek	Derbi	19	+1:40.019	29	
28	68	(Croatia) Ivan Višak	Honda	18	+1 lap	36	
29	67	(Czech Republic) Ladislav Chmelík	Honda	18	+1 lap	35	
30	69	(Czech Republic) Lukáš Šembera	Aprilia	18	+1 lap	25	
Ret	24	(Italy) Simone Corsi	Aprilia	12	Retirement	12	
Ret	32	(Italy) Lorenzo Savadori	Aprilia	8	Accident	30	
Ret	12	(Spain) Esteve Rabat	Aprilia	7	Accident	16	
Ret	39	(Spain) Luis Salom	Aprilia	5	Accident	14	
Ret	53	(Netherlands) Jasper Iwema	Honda	1	Accident	28	
Ret	8	(Italy) Lorenzo Zanetti	Aprilia	1	Accident	21	
DNS	16	(United States) Cameron Beaubier	KTM		Did not start		
OFFICIAL 125cc REPORT

== Championship standings after the race (MotoGP) ==
Below are the standings for the top five riders and constructors after round eleven has concluded.

Riders' Championship standings

Pos.	Rider	Points
1	(Italy) Valentino Rossi	212
2	(Spain) Jorge Lorenzo	162
3	(Australia) Casey Stoner	150
4	(Spain) Dani Pedrosa	135
5	(United States) Colin Edwards	112

Constructors' Championship standings

Pos.	Constructor	Points
1	(Japan) Yamaha	255
2	(Japan) Honda	184
3	(Italy) Ducati	166
4	(Japan) Suzuki	100
5	(Japan) Kawasaki	79

- Note: Only the top five positions are included for both sets of standings.

Previous race: 2009 British Grand Prix	FIM Grand Prix World Championship; 2009 season	Next race: 2009 Indianapolis Grand Prix
Previous race: 2008 Czech Republic Grand Prix	Czech Republic motorcycle Grand Prix	Next race: 2010 Czech Republic Grand Prix
