= 2009 Indianapolis motorcycle Grand Prix =

2009 Indianapolis Grand Prix
Race details
- Race 12 of 17 races in the 2009 Grand Prix motorcycle racing season
- Date: August 30, 2009
- Official name: Red Bull Indianapolis Grand Prix
- Location: Indianapolis Motor Speedway
- Course: Permanent racing facility; 4.216 km (2.620 mi)

MotoGP
Pole position
- Rider: (Spain) Dani Pedrosa
- Time: 1:39.730
Fastest lap
- Rider: (Spain) Jorge Lorenzo
- Time: 1:40.152
Podium
- First: (Spain) Jorge Lorenzo
- Second: (San Marino) Alex de Angelis
- Third: (United States) Nicky Hayden

250cc
Pole position
- Rider: (France) Mike Di Meglio
- Time: 1:44.341
Fastest lap
- Rider: (Italy) Marco Simoncelli
- Time: 1:44.720
Podium
- First: (Italy) Marco Simoncelli
- Second: (Japan) Hiroshi Aoyama
- Third: (Spain) Álvaro Bautista

125cc
Pole position
- Rider: (Spain) Julián Simón
- Time: 1:49.337
Fastest lap
- Rider: (United Kingdom) Bradley Smith
- Time: 1:49.039
Podium
- First: (Spain) Pol Espargaró
- Second: (United Kingdom) Bradley Smith
- Third: (Italy) Simone Corsi

The 2009 Indianapolis Grand Prix was the twelfth round of the 2009 Grand Prix motorcycle racing season. It took place on the weekend of August 28–30, 2009 at the Indianapolis Motor Speedway. The MotoGP race was won by Jorge Lorenzo.

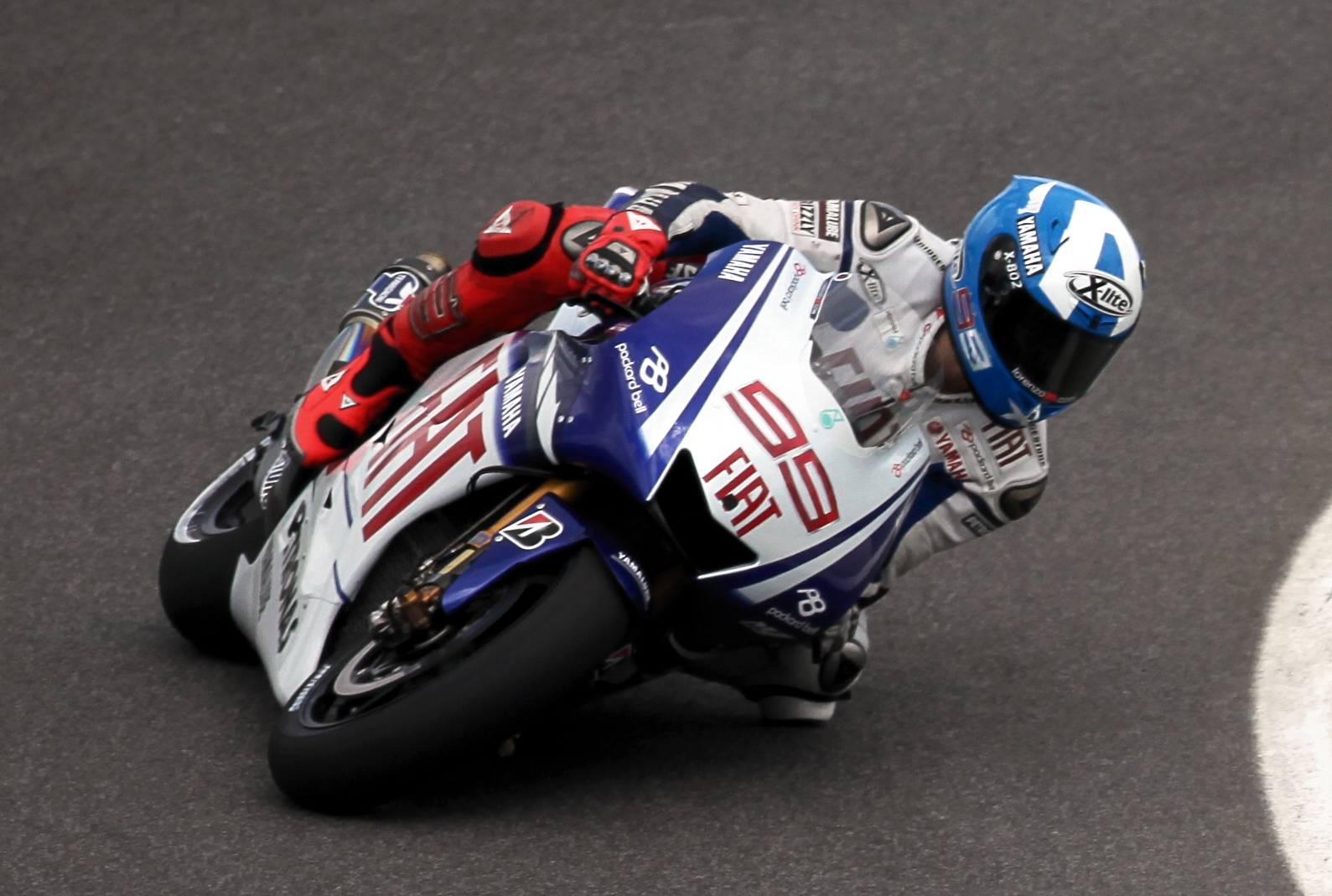
Jorge Lorenzo, riding his bike at the MotoGP race, which he went on to win.

== MotoGP classification ==
Pos.	No.	Rider	Team	Manufacturer	Laps	Time/Retired	Grid	Points
1	99	(Spain) Jorge Lorenzo	Fiat Yamaha Team	Yamaha	28	47:13.592	2	25
2	15	(San Marino) Alex de Angelis	San Carlo Honda Gresini	Honda	28	+9.435	4	20
3	69	(United States) Nicky Hayden	Ducati Team	Ducati	28	+12.947	6	16
4	4	(Italy) Andrea Dovizioso	Repsol Honda Team	Honda	28	+13.478	8	13
5	5	(United States) Colin Edwards	Monster Yamaha Tech 3	Yamaha	28	+26.254	5	11
6	52	(United Kingdom) James Toseland	Monster Yamaha Tech 3	Yamaha	28	+32.408	10	10
7	65	(Italy) Loris Capirossi	Rizla Suzuki MotoGP	Suzuki	28	+34.400	11	9
8	36	(Finland) Mika Kallio	Ducati Team	Ducati	28	+34.856	15	8
9	24	(Spain) Toni Elías	San Carlo Honda Gresini	Honda	28	+45.005	7	7
10	3	(Spain) Dani Pedrosa	Repsol Honda Team	Honda	28	+45.377	1	6
11	7	(Australia) Chris Vermeulen	Rizla Suzuki MotoGP	Suzuki	28	+45.478	14	5
12	14	(France) Randy de Puniet	LCR Honda MotoGP	Honda	28	+52.294	12	4
13	44	(Spain) Aleix Espargaró	Pramac Racing	Ducati	28	+1:03.552	16	3
14	41	(Hungary) Gábor Talmácsi	Scot Racing Team MotoGP	Honda	28	+1:15.086	17	2
Ret	33	(Italy) Marco Melandri	Hayate Racing Team	Kawasaki	25	Accident	9	
Ret	88	(Italy) Niccolò Canepa	Pramac Racing	Ducati	23	Retirement	13	
Ret	46	(Italy) Valentino Rossi	Fiat Yamaha Team	Yamaha	12	Accident	3	

== 250 cc classification ==
Pos.	No.	Rider	Manufacturer	Laps	Time/Retired	Grid	Points
1	58	(Italy) Marco Simoncelli	Gilera	26	45:43.599	3	25
2	4	(Japan) Hiroshi Aoyama	Honda	26	+1.943	2	20
3	19	(Spain) Álvaro Bautista	Aprilia	26	+4.661	6	16
4	63	(France) Mike Di Meglio	Aprilia	26	+12.776	1	13
5	15	(Italy) Roberto Locatelli	Gilera	26	+15.475	12	11
6	40	(Spain) Héctor Barberá	Aprilia	26	+19.471	4	10
7	52	(Czech Republic) Lukáš Pešek	Aprilia	26	+22.682	11	9
8	55	(Spain) Héctor Faubel	Honda	26	+32.809	10	8
9	12	(Switzerland) Thomas Lüthi	Aprilia	26	+49.321	14	7
10	17	(Czech Republic) Karel Abraham	Aprilia	26	+49.845	16	6
11	35	(Italy) Raffaele De Rosa	Honda	26	+53.567	15	5
12	25	(Italy) Alex Baldolini	Aprilia	26	+1:29.717	13	4
13	53	(France) Valentin Debise	Honda	26	+1:37.837	17	3
14	7	(Spain) Axel Pons	Aprilia	26	+1:46.672	18	2
15	56	(Russia) Vladimir Leonov	Aprilia	26	+1:46.821	21	1
16	11	(Hungary) Balázs Németh	Aprilia	25	+1 lap	20	
17	10	(Hungary) Imre Tóth	Aprilia	25	+1 lap	19	
18	29	(United States) Barrett Long	Yamaha	25	+1 lap	25	
19	30	(Canada) Adam Roberts	Yamaha	25	+1 lap	23	
Ret	14	(Thailand) Ratthapark Wilairot	Honda	23	Retirement	9	
Ret	6	(Spain) Alex Debón	Aprilia	18	Accident	8	
Ret	16	(France) Jules Cluzel	Aprilia	7	Accident	5	
Ret	75	(Italy) Mattia Pasini	Aprilia	5	Retirement	7	
Ret	8	(Switzerland) Bastien Chesaux	Honda	0	Accident	22	
DNS	48	(Japan) Shoya Tomizawa	Honda		Did not start		
OFFICIAL 250cc REPORT

== 125 cc classification ==
Pos.	No.	Rider	Manufacturer	Laps	Time/Retired	Grid	Points
1	44	(Spain) Pol Espargaró	Derbi	23	42:07.925	4	25
2	38	(United Kingdom) Bradley Smith	Aprilia	23	+0.120	5	20
3	24	(Italy) Simone Corsi	Aprilia	23	+0.448	6	16
4	18	(Spain) Nicolás Terol	Aprilia	23	+1.613	3	13
5	60	(Spain) Julián Simón	Aprilia	23	+1.801	1	11
6	93	(Spain) Marc Márquez	KTM	23	+19.345	9	10
7	17	(Germany) Stefan Bradl	Aprilia	23	+19.358	15	9
8	6	(Spain) Joan Olivé	Derbi	23	+25.611	10	8
9	73	(Japan) Takaaki Nakagami	Aprilia	23	+29.240	19	7
10	77	(Switzerland) Dominique Aegerter	Derbi	23	+29.707	17	6
11	99	(United Kingdom) Danny Webb	Aprilia	23	+30.464	11	5
12	94	(Germany) Jonas Folger	Aprilia	23	+44.460	21	4
13	39	(Spain) Luis Salom	Aprilia	23	+44.549	20	3
14	71	(Japan) Tomoyoshi Koyama	Loncin	23	+45.328	16	2
15	33	(Spain) Sergio Gadea	Aprilia	23	+45.435	7	1
16	88	(Austria) Michael Ranseder	Aprilia	23	+45.479	14	
17	8	(Italy) Lorenzo Zanetti	Aprilia	23	+45.998	24	
18	11	(Germany) Sandro Cortese	Derbi	23	+53.791	2	
19	16	(United States) Cameron Beaubier	KTM	23	+1:01.179	23	
20	12	(Spain) Esteve Rabat	Aprilia	23	+1:02.814	22	
21	7	(Spain) Efrén Vázquez	Derbi	23	+1:14.891	8	
22	69	(Czech Republic) Lukáš Šembera	Aprilia	23	+1:16.320	28	
23	14	(France) Johann Zarco	Aprilia	23	+1:31.218	13	
24	87	(Italy) Luca Marconi	Aprilia	23	+1:31.569	27	
25	10	(Italy) Luca Vitali	Aprilia	23	+1:51.274	31	
Ret	29	(Italy) Andrea Iannone	Aprilia	20	Retirement	12	
Ret	35	(Switzerland) Randy Krummenacher	Aprilia	17	Accident	25	
Ret	45	(United Kingdom) Scott Redding	Aprilia	11	Retirement	26	
Ret	5	(France) Alexis Masbou	Loncin	7	Retirement	29	
Ret	74	(United States) Ben Young	Aprilia	3	Retirement	32	
Ret	32	(Italy) Lorenzo Savadori	Aprilia	3	Retirement	18	
Ret	75	(United States) Miles Thornton	Aprilia	1	Accident	30	
OFFICIAL 125cc REPORT

== Championship standings after the race (MotoGP) ==
Below are the standings for the top five riders and constructors after round twelve has concluded.

Riders' Championship standings

Pos.	Rider	Points
1	(Italy) Valentino Rossi	212
2	(Spain) Jorge Lorenzo	187
3	(Australia) Casey Stoner	150
4	(Spain) Dani Pedrosa	141
5	(United States) Colin Edwards	123

Constructors' Championship standings

Pos.	Constructor	Points
1	(Japan) Yamaha	280
2	(Japan) Honda	204
3	(Italy) Ducati	182
4	(Japan) Suzuki	109
5	(Japan) Kawasaki	79

- Note: Only the top five positions are included for both sets of standings.

Previous race: 2009 Czech Republic Grand Prix	FIM Grand Prix World Championship; 2009 season	Next race: 2009 San Marino Grand Prix
Previous race: 2008 Indianapolis Grand Prix	Indianapolis motorcycle Grand Prix	Next race: 2010 Indianapolis Grand Prix
