= 2016 Valencian Community motorcycle Grand Prix =

2016 Valencian Community Grand Prix
Race details
- Race 18 of 18 races in the 2016 Grand Prix motorcycle racing season
- Date: 13 November 2016
- Official name: Gran Premio Motul de la Comunitat Valenciana
- Location: Circuit Ricardo Tormo
- Course: Permanent racing facility; 4.005 km (2.489 mi)

MotoGP
Pole position
Rider	(Spain) Jorge Lorenzo	Yamaha
Time	1:29.401	
Fastest lap
Rider	(Spain) Jorge Lorenzo	Yamaha
Time	1:31.171 on lap 5	
Podium
First	(Spain) Jorge Lorenzo	Yamaha
Second	(Spain) Marc Márquez	Honda
Third	(Italy) Andrea Iannone	Ducati

Moto2
Pole position
Rider	(France) Johann Zarco	Kalex
Time	1:34.879	
Fastest lap
Rider	(France) Johann Zarco	Kalex
Time	1:35.521 on lap 20	
Podium
First	(France) Johann Zarco	Kalex
Second	(Switzerland) Thomas Lüthi	Kalex
Third	(Italy) Franco Morbidelli	Kalex

Moto3
Pole position
Rider	(Spain) Arón Canet	Honda
Time	1:39.261	
Fastest lap
Rider	(South Africa) Brad Binder	KTM
Time	1:39.684 on lap 10	
Podium
First	(South Africa) Brad Binder	KTM
Second	(Spain) Joan Mir	KTM
Third	(Italy) Andrea Migno	KTM

The 2016 Valencian Community motorcycle Grand Prix was the eighteenth and last round of the 2016 Grand Prix motorcycle racing season. It was held at the Circuit Ricardo Tormo in Valencia on 13 November 2016.

The MotoGP class race saw the début of the KTM RC16, in preparation for its full season début in 2017.

== Classification ==
=== MotoGP ===
Pos.	No.	Rider	Team	Manufacturer	Laps	Time/Retired	Grid	Points
1	99	(Spain) Jorge Lorenzo	Movistar Yamaha MotoGP	Yamaha	30	45:54.228	1	25
2	93	(Spain) Marc Márquez	Repsol Honda Team	Honda	30	+1.185	2	20
3	29	(Italy) Andrea Iannone	Ducati Team	Ducati	30	+6.603	7	16
4	46	(Italy) Valentino Rossi	Movistar Yamaha MotoGP	Yamaha	30	+7.668	3	13
5	25	(Spain) Maverick Viñales	Team Suzuki Ecstar	Suzuki	30	+10.610	4	11
6	44	(Spain) Pol Espargaró	Monster Yamaha Tech 3	Yamaha	30	+18.378	6	10
7	4	(Italy) Andrea Dovizioso	Ducati Team	Ducati	30	+18.417	5	9
8	41	(Spain) Aleix Espargaró	Team Suzuki Ecstar	Suzuki	30	+18.678	9	8
9	38	(United Kingdom) Bradley Smith	Monster Yamaha Tech 3	Yamaha	30	+25.993	10	7
10	19	(Spain) Álvaro Bautista	Aprilia Racing Team Gresini	Aprilia	30	+35.065	18	6
11	8	(Spain) Héctor Barberá	Avintia Racing	Ducati	30	+36.425	13	5
12	9	(Italy) Danilo Petrucci	Octo Pramac Yakhnich	Ducati	30	+42.415	12	4
13	6	(Germany) Stefan Bradl	Aprilia Racing Team Gresini	Aprilia	30	+49.823	17	3
14	45	(United Kingdom) Scott Redding	Octo Pramac Yakhnich	Ducati	30	+52.035	14	2
15	43	(Australia) Jack Miller	Estrella Galicia 0,0 Marc VDS	Honda	30	+55.625	15	1
16	50	(Republic of Ireland) Eugene Laverty	Pull & Bear Aspar Team	Ducati	30	+58.254	19	
17	53	(Spain) Tito Rabat	Estrella Galicia 0,0 Marc VDS	Honda	30	+58.555	21	
18	76	(France) Loris Baz	Avintia Racing	Ducati	30	+1:06.164	16	
Ret	36	(Finland) Mika Kallio	Red Bull KTM Factory Racing	KTM	19	Electrics	20	
Ret	35	(United Kingdom) Cal Crutchlow	LCR Honda	Honda	16	Accident	11	
Ret	26	(Spain) Dani Pedrosa	Repsol Honda Team	Honda	6	Accident	8	
Ret	68	(Colombia) Yonny Hernández	Pull & Bear Aspar Team	Ducati	4	Accident	22	

=== Moto2 ===
Pos.	No.	Rider	Manufacturer	Laps	Time/Retired	Grid	Points
1	5	(France) Johann Zarco	Kalex	27	43:17.626	1	25
2	12	(Switzerland) Thomas Lüthi	Kalex	27	+3.281	2	20
3	21	(Italy) Franco Morbidelli	Kalex	27	+4.981	3	16
4	22	(United Kingdom) Sam Lowes	Kalex	27	+5.636	7	13
5	40	(Spain) Álex Rins	Kalex	27	+5.850	5	11
6	30	(Japan) Takaaki Nakagami	Kalex	27	+11.605	9	10
7	54	(Italy) Mattia Pasini	Kalex	27	+16.391	4	9
8	94	(Germany) Jonas Folger	Kalex	27	+16.964	11	8
9	52	(United Kingdom) Danny Kent	Kalex	27	+17.451	8	7
10	23	(Germany) Marcel Schrötter	Kalex	27	+17.668	12	6
11	24	(Italy) Simone Corsi	Speed Up	27	+20.455	22	5
12	97	(Spain) Xavi Vierge	Tech 3	27	+20.911	19	4
13	44	(Portugal) Miguel Oliveira	Kalex	27	+21.650	15	3
14	7	(Italy) Lorenzo Baldassarri	Kalex	27	+22.581	23	2
15	55	(Malaysia) Hafizh Syahrin	Kalex	27	+23.734	24	1
16	19	(Belgium) Xavier Siméon	Speed Up	27	+26.328	13	
17	2	(Switzerland) Jesko Raffin	Kalex	27	+29.421	21	
18	87	(Australia) Remy Gardner	Kalex	27	+29.667	17	
19	57	(Spain) Edgar Pons	Kalex	27	+29.749	20	
20	14	(Thailand) Ratthapark Wilairot	Kalex	27	+39.289	25	
21	70	(Switzerland) Robin Mulhauser	Kalex	27	+43.105	27	
22	10	(Italy) Luca Marini	Kalex	27	+43.532	18	
23	60	(Spain) Julián Simón	Speed Up	27	+51.271	6	
24	27	(Spain) Iker Lecuona	Kalex	27	+56.617	26	
Ret	73	(Spain) Álex Márquez	Kalex	17	Arm Pump	10	
Ret	32	(Spain) Isaac Viñales	Tech 3	10	Handling	29	
Ret	42	(Italy) Federico Fuligni	Kalex	5	Accident Damage	28	
Ret	11	(Germany) Sandro Cortese	Kalex	4	Accident	14	
Ret	49	(Spain) Axel Pons	Kalex	4	Accident	16	
Ret	16	(France) Hugo Clere	TransFIORmers	4	Retirement	30	
OFFICIAL MOTO2 REPORT

=== Moto3 ===
Pos.	No.	Rider	Manufacturer	Laps	Time/Retired	Grid	Points
1	41	(South Africa) Brad Binder	KTM	24	40:13.777	2	25
2	36	(Spain) Joan Mir	KTM	24	+0.056	7	20
3	16	(Italy) Andrea Migno	KTM	24	+0.081	15	16
4	33	(Italy) Enea Bastianini	Honda	24	+0.147	6	13
5	4	(Italy) Fabio Di Giannantonio	Honda	24	+0.713	9	11
6	58	(Spain) Juan Francisco Guevara	KTM	24	+0.899	4	10
7	84	(Czech Republic) Jakub Kornfeil	Honda	24	+2.683	24	9
8	65	(Germany) Philipp Öttl	KTM	24	+3.145	5	8
9	9	(Spain) Jorge Navarro	Honda	24	+5.263	14	7
10	88	(Spain) Jorge Martín	Mahindra	24	+7.921	12	6
11	31	(Spain) Raúl Fernández	KTM	24	+8.081	17	5
12	40	(South Africa) Darryn Binder	Mahindra	24	+8.250	29	4
13	64	(Netherlands) Bo Bendsneyder	KTM	24	+8.603	20	3
14	20	(France) Fabio Quartararo	KTM	24	+9.283	23	2
15	11	(Belgium) Livio Loi	Honda	24	+9.358	19	1
16	23	(Italy) Niccolò Antonelli	Honda	24	+9.527	18	
17	8	(Italy) Nicolò Bulega	KTM	24	+9.652	16	
18	24	(Japan) Tatsuki Suzuki	Mahindra	24	+9.950	22	
19	44	(Spain) Arón Canet	Honda	24	+16.838	1	
20	55	(Italy) Andrea Locatelli	KTM	24	+18.712	27	
21	76	(Japan) Hiroki Ono	Honda	24	+18.737	3	
22	98	(Czech Republic) Karel Hanika	KTM	24	+18.976	10	
23	63	(Spain) Vicente Pérez	Peugeot	24	+19.039	21	
24	12	(Spain) Albert Arenas	Peugeot	24	+24.297	26	
25	89	(Malaysia) Khairul Idham Pawi	Honda	24	+24.526	25	
26	95	(France) Jules Danilo	Honda	24	+25.331	28	
27	7	(Malaysia) Adam Norrodin	Honda	24	+25.370	30	
28	77	(Italy) Lorenzo Petrarca	Mahindra	24	+48.829	33	
29	26	(Spain) Daniel Sáez	KTM	24	+48.861	31	
30	99	(France) Enzo Boulom	Mahindra	24	+49.282	32	
31	43	(Italy) Stefano Valtulini	Mahindra	24	+1:12.409	34	
Ret	42	(Spain) Marcos Ramírez	Mahindra	7	Retirement	35	
Ret	48	(Italy) Lorenzo Dalla Porta	KTM	3	Accident	8	
Ret	19	(Argentina) Gabriel Rodrigo	KTM	0	Accident	11	
Ret	21	(Italy) Francesco Bagnaia	Mahindra	0	Accident	13	
OFFICIAL MOTO3 REPORT

== Championship standings after the race (MotoGP) ==
Below are the standings for the top five riders and constructors after round eighteen has concluded.

Riders' Championship standings

Pos.	Rider	Points
1	(Spain) Marc Marquez	298
2	(Italy) Valentino Rossi	249
3	(Spain) Jorge Lorenzo	233
4	(Spain) Maverick Vinales	202
5	(Italy) Andrea Dovizioso	171

Constructors' Championship standings

Pos.	Constructor	Points
1	(Japan) Honda	369
2	(Japan) Yamaha	353
3	(Italy) Ducati	261
4	(Japan) Suzuki	208
5	(Italy) Aprilia	101

- Note: Only the top five positions are included for both sets of standings.

Previous race: 2016 Malaysian Grand Prix	FIM Grand Prix World Championship; 2016 season	Next race: 2017 Qatar Grand Prix
Previous race: 2015 Valencian Grand Prix	Valencian Community motorcycle Grand Prix	Next race: 2017 Valencian Grand Prix
