= European Superstock 600 Championship =

- The podium of the 2013 European Superstock 600 Silverstone round
- Category: Motorcycle sport
- Country: Europe
- Inaugural season: 2005
- Folded: 2015
- Last Riders' champion: (Turkey) Toprak Razgatlıoğlu
- Official website: worldsbk.com

The European Superstock 600 Championship was a support class to the Superbike World Championship at the European rounds. The championship used 600 cc production motorcycles and was reserved for riders between 15 and 24 years of age. Same rules as FIM Superstock 1000 Cup applied, but the series was organized by FIM Europe. In November 2015 the championship was discontinued as a result of the creation of a new European sub-series to be held within the Supersport World Championship and changes in the Supersport technical regulations.

== Champions ==
Season	Rider champion	Bike
2005	(Italy) Claudio Corti	Yamaha YZF-R6
2006	(Belgium) Xavier Siméon	Suzuki GSX-R600
2007	(France) Maxime Berger	Yamaha YZF-R6
2008	(France) Loris Baz	Yamaha YZF-R6
2009	(United Kingdom) Gino Rea	Honda CBR600RR
2010	(France) Jérémy Guarnoni	Yamaha YZF-R6
2011	(Australia) Jed Metcher	Yamaha YZF-R6
2012	(Netherlands) Michael van der Mark	Honda CBR600RR
2013	(Italy) Franco Morbidelli	Kawasaki ZX-6R
2014	(Italy) Marco Faccani	Kawasaki ZX-6R
2015	(Turkey) Toprak Razgatlıoğlu	Kawasaki ZX-6R
