= 2012 FIM CEV Moto2 European Championship =

2012 FIM CEV Moto2 European Championship
| Previous: | 2011 | Next: | 2013 |
Support series: CEV Moto3

The 2012 FIM CEV Moto2 European Championship was the third season of the CEV Moto2. The season was held over 7 races at 7 meetings, beginning on 1 April at Jerez and finished on 18 November at Valencia.

Jordi Torres won the title after beating closest rival Román Ramos.

== Calendar ==
2012 Calendar
| Round | Date | Circuit | Pole position | Fastest lap | Race winner | Winning constructor |
|---|---|---|---|---|---|---|
| 1 | 1 April | (Spain) Jerez | (Spain) Dani Rivas | (Malaysia) Hafizh Syahrin | (Spain) Dani Rivas | Kalex |
| 2 | 22 April | (Spain) Navarra | (Spain) Álex Mariñelarena | (Spain) Jordi Torres | (Spain) Jordi Torres | Suter |
| 3 | 27 May | (Spain) Aragón | (Spain) Jordi Torres | (Spain) Jordi Torres | (Spain) Jordi Torres | Suter |
| 4 | 24 June | (Spain) Catalunya | (Spain) Jordi Torres | (Spain) Jordi Torres | (Spain) Jordi Torres | Suter |
| 5 | 22 July | (Spain) Albacete 1 | (Spain) Jordi Torres | (Spain) Jordi Torres | (Spain) Román Ramos | Ariane |
| 6 | 9 September | (Spain) Albacete 2 | (Spain) Jordi Torres | (Spain) Jordi Torres | (Spain) Jordi Torres | Suter |
| 7 | 18 November | (Spain) Valencia | (Spain) Jordi Torres | (Spain) Álex Mariñelarena | (Spain) Jordi Torres | Suter |

== Entry list ==
| Team | Bike | No. | Rider | Rounds |
|---|---|---|---|---|
| (Spain) Andalucia Cádiz | AJR | 15 | (Spain) Javier Alviz | 1–5, 7 |
| (Spain) FMTorrent | AJR | 75 | (Spain) Francisco García | 7 |
| (Spain) Halcourier MS | AJR | 27 | (Spain) Russell Gómez | 1–4 |
| (Spain) Halcourier MS | AJR | 47 | (Spain) Ángel Rodríguez | 5–7 |
| (Spain) Halcourier MS | AJR | 64 | (Colombia) Santiago Hernández | All |
| (Spain) MR Griful Team | AJR | 34 | (Argentina) Ezequiel Iturrioz | All |
| (Spain) MR Griful Team | AJR | 74 | (Argentina) Andrés González | 1–3, 7 |
| (Spain) MY Motoracing | AJR | 31 | (Spain) Xeray Vargas | 5–6 |
| (Spain) X–Bike | AJR | 81 | (Spain) Angel Molero | 2–4, 6 |
| (Spain) DMS–Motorrad | Ariane | 14 | (Brazil) Nicolás Felipe | 1 |
| (Spain) Motorrad Ariane | Ariane | 37 | (Chile) Rodrigo Concha | 7 |
| (Spain) Motorrad Competición | Ariane | 11 | (Spain) Pau Tortosa | 1 |
| (Spain) Motorrad Competición | Ariane | 40 | (Spain) Román Ramos | All |
| (Spain) Motorrad Competición | Ariane | 80 | (Russia) Iván Lookin | 7 |
| (Spain) PL Racing Moto2 | Ariane | 9 | (United States) Kenny Noyes | 5–7 |
| (Spain) Bottpower | Bottpower | 51 | (Brazil) Ricieri Luvizotto | 6 |
| (Italy) Andreozzi Reparto Corse | FTR | 21 | (Italy) Alessandro Andreozzi | 3 |
| (United Kingdom) FOGI Racing | FTR | 24 | (United States) Tommy Aquino | 1–2, 4 |
| (United Kingdom) FOGI Racing | FTR | 50 | (Canada) Austin Shaw O'Leary | 7 |
| (United Kingdom) FOGI Racing | FTR | 81 | (United Kingdom) Graeme Gowland | 7 |
| Petronas Raceline Malaysia | FTR | 55 | (Malaysia) Hafizh Syahrin | All |
| (Spain) GPD Engineering | GPD Tecs | 33 | (Spain) Guillermo Casas | 1 |
| (Spain) GPD Engineering | GPD Tecs | 33 | (Argentina) Alberto Auad | 5 |
| (Spain) H43 Team Nobby | GPD Tecs | 71 | (Japan) Tomoyoshi Koyama | All |
| (Spain) H43 Team Nobby | GPD Tecs | 76 | (Spain) Luis Miguel Mora | All |
| (Spain) Lozano Motoracing | GPD Tecs | 32 | (Spain) Daniel Arroyo | 7 |
| (Spain) TSR Galicia School | Harris | 41 | (Italy) Federico D'Annunzio | 4 |
| (Spain) Wilmax Harris Racing | Harris | 17 | (Portugal) Miguel Praia | 1–2 |
| (Spain) Wilmax Harris Racing | Harris | 41 | (Italy) Federico D'Annunzio | 1–3 |
| (Spain) Wilmax Harris Racing | Harris | 99 | (Argentina) Carlos Cejas | All |
| (Spain) Inmotec | Inmotec | 12 | (France) Lucas Mahias | 1–2 |
| (Spain) AJRacing | Kalex | 20 | (Switzerland) Jesko Raffin | All |
| (Spain) TSR Galicia School | Kalex | 7 | (Spain) Dani Rivas | 1–2, 5–7 |
| (Spain) TSR Galicia School | Kalex | 10 | (Spain) Juan Ramírez | 1, 4–5 |
| (Spain) MIR Racing | MIR Racing | 47 | (Spain) Adrian Menchén | 1 |
| (Spain) Federacing Team Competición | MIR Racing | 16 | (Spain) Óscar Climent | All |
| (Spain) Federacing Team Competición | MIR Racing | 36 | (Spain) Aitor Montero | 1–2 |
| (Spain) Federacing Team Competición | MIR Racing | 97 | (Spain) Rubén Fenoll | 1–3 |
| (Qatar) QMMF Racing Team | Moriwaki | 95 | (Qatar) Nasser Al Malki | All |
| (Qatar) QMMF Racing Team | Moriwaki | 96 | (Qatar) Saeed Al Sulaiti | 3–7 |
| (Monaco) JiR Moto2 | Motobi | 57 | (Brazil) Eric Granado | 1–3 |
| (Spain) CNS Motorsport | Suter | 92 | (Spain) Álex Mariñelarena | All |
| Equipe de France | Suter | 90 | (France) Dylan Caroche | 6–7 |
| (Spain) JHK T–Shirt Laglisse | Suter | 18 | (Spain) Jordi Torres | All |
| (Spain) JHK T–Shirt Laglisse | Suter | 44 | (South Africa) Steven Odendaal | All |
| (Spain) JHK T–Shirt Laglisse | Suter | 54 | (Mexico) Richie Escalante | 2–7 |
| (Spain) PL Racing Moto2 | Suter | 9 | (United States) Kenny Noyes | 1–4 |
| (Spain) PL Racing Moto2 | Suter | 52 | (Argentina) Juan Martin Solorza | 1, 3–5 |
| (Spain) RC Recouso Sport | Suter | 37 | (Chile) Rodrigo Concha | 1 |
| (United Kingdom) Team BRP Racing | Suter | 45 | (Australia) Kris McLaren | 1–4 |
| (Spain) Team Motorrika | Suter | 12 | (France) Lucas Mahias | 7 |
| (France) TFC Racing | Suter | 12 | (France) Lucas Mahias | 4 |
| (Spain) TMR La Bruixa d'or | Suter | 19 | (Spain) Pere Tutusaus | 7 |

== Championship standings ==
| Pos. | Rider | Bike | JER 1 (Spain) | NAV (Spain) | ARA (Spain) | CAT (Spain) | ALB 1 (Spain) | ALB 2 (Spain) | VAL (Spain) | Pts |
|---|---|---|---|---|---|---|---|---|---|---|
| 1 | (Spain) Jordi Torres | Suter | 6 | 1^{F} | 1^{P} ^{F} | 1^{P} ^{F} | Ret^{P} ^{F} | 1^{P} ^{F} | 1^{P} | 135 |
| 2 | (Spain) Román Ramos | Ariane | 9 | 4 | 2 | 3 | 1 | 3 | 2 | 117 |
| 3 | (United States) Kenny Noyes | Suter | 3 | 3 | 3 | 2 | | | | 87 |
| 3 | (United States) Kenny Noyes | Ariane | | | | | Ret | 8 | 5 | 87 |
| 4 | (Spain) Dani Rivas | Kalex | 1^{P} | Ret | | | 2 | 2 | 3 | 81 |
| 5 | (Spain) Álex Mariñelarena | Suter | 4 | 2^{P} | Ret | 4 | 3 | 4 | Ret^{F} | 75 |
| 6 | (Malaysia) Hafizh Syahrin | FTR | 5^{F} | EX | 7 | 5 | 4 | 5 | Ret | 55 |
| 7 | (Colombia) Santiago Hernández | AJR | 26 | 6 | 4 | Ret | 5 | 6 | 6 | 54 |
| 8 | (South Africa) Steven Odendaal | Suter | 13 | 7 | 6 | 6 | 9 | 11 | 9 | 51 |
| 9 | (Japan) Tomoyoshi Koyama | GPD Tecs | 29 | 5 | 9 | 8 | 10 | 12 | 8 | 44 |
| 10 | (Spain) Óscar Climent | MIR Racing | 28 | 19 | 13 | 10 | 6 | 7 | 4 | 41 |
| 11 | (Switzerland) Jesko Raffin | Kalex | 27 | 8 | 5 | Ret | 7 | Ret | 7 | 37 |
| 12 | (France) Lucas Mahias | Inmotec | 7 | 14 | | | | | | 26 |
| 12 | (France) Lucas Mahias | Suter | | | | 7 | | | 10 | 26 |
| 13 | (Argentina) Ezequiel Iturrioz | AJR | 11 | 16 | 19 | 9 | 11 | 13 | 12 | 24 |
| 14 | (Italy) Federico D'Annunzio | Harris | 10 | 12 | 10 | 11 | | | | 21 |
| 15 | (Australia) Kris McLaren | Suter | 2 | Ret | Ret | 17 | | | | 20 |
| 16 | (Mexico) Richie Escalante | Suter | | 20 | 8 | Ret | Ret | 10 | Ret | 14 |
| 17 | (Qatar) Nasser Al Malki | Moriwaki | 19 | 18 | 17 | 13 | 12 | 14 | 11 | 14 |
| 18 | (Spain) Luis Miguel Mora | GPD Tecs | 30 | 9 | Ret | Ret | 13 | 16 | 14 | 12 |
| 19 | (Spain) Russell Gómez | AJR | 8 | 13 | 16 | Ret | | | | 11 |
| 20 | (Spain) Javier Alviz | AJR | 18 | Ret | 18 | 14 | 8 | | DNS | 10 |
| 21 | (United States) Tommy Aquino | FTR | 20 | 10 | | 12 | | | | 10 |
| 22 | (Spain) Ángel Rodríguez | AJR | | | | | EX | 9 | Ret | 7 |
| 23 | (Portugal) Miguel Praia | Harris | 14 | 11 | | | | | | 7 |
| 24 | (Italy) Alessandro Andreozzi | FTR | | | 11 | | | | | 5 |
| 25 | (Spain) Pau Tortosa | Ariane | 12 | | | | | | | 4 |
| 26 | (Argentina) Juan Martin Solorza | Suter | DNS | | 12 | 16 | Ret | | | 4 |
| 27 | (Argentina) Andrés González | AJR | 16 | 15 | Ret | | | | 13 | 4 |
| 28 | (Spain) Juan Ramírez | Kalex | DNS | | | 15 | 14 | | | 3 |
| 29 | (Spain) Angel Molero | AJR | | 17 | 14 | Ret | | Ret | | 2 |
| 30 | (Spain) Xeray Vargas | AJR | | | | | 15 | 15 | | 2 |
| 31 | (Spain) Pere Tutusaus | Suter | | | | | | | 15 | 1 |
| 32 | (Spain) Rubén Fenoll | MIR Racing | 15 | Ret | 21 | | | | | 1 |
| 33 | (Brazil) Eric Granado | Motobi | 22 | Ret | 15 | | | | | 1 |
| | (Russia) Iván Lookin | Ariane | | | | | | | 16 | 0 |
| | (Qatar) Saeed Al Sulaiti | Moriwaki | | | 22 | 18 | 16 | 17 | 19 | 0 |
| | (Argentina) Carlos Cejas | Harris | 23 | Ret | 20 | 19 | 17 | 18 | Ret | 0 |
| | (France) Dylan Caroche | Suter | | | | | | 19 | 17 | 0 |
| | (Spain) Aitor Montero | MIR Racing | 17 | Ret | | | | | | 0 |
| | (United Kingdom) Graeme Gowland | FTR | | | | | | | 18 | 0 |
| | (Argentina) Alberto Auad | GPD Tecs | | | | | 18 | | | 0 |
| | (Brazil) Ricieri Luvizotto | Bottpower | | | | | | 20 | | 0 |
| | (Chile) Rodrigo Concha | Suter | 21 | | | | | | | 0 |
| | (Chile) Rodrigo Concha | Ariane | | | | | | | Ret | 0 |
| | (Brazil) Nicolás Felipe | Ariane | 24 | | | | | | | 0 |
| | (Spain) Adrian Menchén | MIR Racing | 25 | | | | | | | 0 |
| | (Canada) Austin Shaw O'Leary | FTR | | | | | | | Ret | 0 |
| | (Spain) Daniel Arroyo | GPD Tecs | | | | | | | Ret | 0 |
| | (Spain) Guillermo Casas | GPD Tecs | Ret | | | | | | | 0 |
| | (Spain) Francisco García | AJR | | | | | | | DNS | |
| Pos. | Rider | Bike | JER 1 (Spain) | NAV (Spain) | ARA (Spain) | CAT (Spain) | ALB 1 (Spain) | ALB 2 (Spain) | VAL (Spain) | Pts |

| Colour | Result |
|---|---|
| Gold | Winner |
| Silver | Second place |
| Bronze | Third place |
| Green | Points classification |
| Blue | Non-points classification |
| Blue | Non-classified finish (NC) |
| Purple | Retired, not classified (Ret) |
| Red | Did not qualify (DNQ) |
| Red | Did not pre-qualify (DNPQ) |
| Black | Disqualified (DSQ) |
| White | Did not start (DNS) |
| White | Withdrew (WD) |
| White | Race cancelled (C) |
| Blank | Did not practice (DNP) |
| Blank | Did not arrive (DNA) |
| Blank | Excluded (EX) |

P – Pole position
F – Fastest lap
