= 2013 FIM CEV Moto2 European Championship =

Fourth season of the FIM CEV Moto2 European Championship

2013 FIM CEV Moto2 European Championship
Previous:	2012	Next:	2014
Support series: FIM CEV Moto3 International Championship

The 2013 FIM CEV Moto2 European Championship was the fourth season of the FIM CEV Moto2 European Championship. The season was held over 9 races at 7 meetings, beginning on 28 April at the Catalunya and finished on 24 November at the Jerez.

Román Ramos won the title after beating closest rival Álex Mariñelarena.

== Calendar ==
2013 Calendar
Round	Date	Circuit	Pole position	Fastest lap	Race winner	Winning constructor
1	28 April	(Spain) Catalunya	(Malaysia) Hafizh Syahrin	(Spain) Álex Mariñelarena	(Spain) Álex Mariñelarena	Suter
2	26 May	(Spain) Aragón	(Switzerland) Jesko Raffin	(Spain) Román Ramos	(Spain) Román Ramos	Ariane
2	26 May	(Spain) Aragón	(Switzerland) Jesko Raffin	(Switzerland) Jesko Raffin	(Switzerland) Jesko Raffin	Kalex
3	23 June	(Spain) Albacete 1	(Spain) Román Ramos	(Spain) Dani Rivas	(Spain) Álex Mariñelarena	Suter
4	8 September	(Spain) Albacete 2	(Spain) Román Ramos	(Spain) Román Ramos	(Spain) Román Ramos	Ariane
5	22 September	(Spain) Navarra	(Spain) Román Ramos	(Spain) Álex Mariñelarena	(Malaysia) Hafizh Syahrin	Kalex
5	22 September	(Spain) Navarra	(Spain) Román Ramos	(Spain) Álex Mariñelarena	(Spain) Álex Mariñelarena	Kalex
6	17 November	(Spain) Valencia	(Malaysia) Hafizh Syahrin	(Malaysia) Hafizh Syahrin	(Malaysia) Hafizh Syahrin	Kalex
7	24 November	(Spain) Jerez	(Spain) Álex Mariñelarena	(Spain) Álex Mariñelarena	(Spain) Álex Mariñelarena	Kalex

== Entry list ==
Team	Bike	No.	Rider	Rounds
Moto2
(Spain) H43 Team Nobby Talasur Blumaq	AJR	17	(Spain) Russell Gómez	All
(Spain) H43 Team Nobby Talasur Blumaq	AJR	18	(Australia) Samuel Rankin	1–3, 5–7
(Spain) H43 Team Nobby Talasur Blumaq	AJR	76	(Spain) Luis Miguel Mora	1–3
(Spain) H43 Team Nobby Talasur Blumaq	Ariane	12	(Norway) Thomas Sigvartsen	6
(Spain) Team Stratos	Ariane	37	(Chile) Rodrigo Concha	1–3, 5
(Spain) Team Stratos	Ariane	40	(Spain) Román Ramos	All
(Spain) Team Stratos	Ariane	44	(Spain) Arturo Tizón	4
(Spain) Team Stratos	Ariane	66	(Sweden) Robert Gull	6–7
(Spain) Team Stratos	Ariane	70	(Italy) Luca Vitali	7
(Spain) Team Stratos	Ariane	90	(Kazakhstan) Iván Lookin	1
(Russia) Motorrika	Bottpower	79	(Russia) Maksim Averkin	1
(Spain) Team FTR Palmeto	FTR	43	(United Kingdom) James Folkard	4–7
(Spain) Escuderia GPE	GPE	30	(Spain) Xeray Vargas	4
(United Kingdom) Wilson Racing	Harris	54	(United Kingdom) Marcus Woodbine	1–4, 6–7
(Spain) MS Factory Racing	IAMT	45	(Germany) Jan Bühn	7
(Spain) MS Factory Racing	IAMT	50	(Austria) Lukas Trautmann	6–7
(Spain) Inmotec	Inmotec	3	(Spain) Christian Vidal	1
(Spain) Inmotec	Inmotec	82	(Spain) Elena Rosell	5
(Spain) Amalgama	Kalex	16	(Spain) Óscar Climent	1–3
Petronas Raceline Malaysia	Kalex	55	(Malaysia) Hafizh Syahrin	All
(Spain) Pons Racing	Kalex	10	(Switzerland) Jesko Raffin	All
(Spain) Pons Racing	Kalex	57	(Spain) Edgar Pons	All
(Spain) Targobank Motorsport	Kalex	92	(Spain) Álex Mariñelarena	5–7
(Spain) TSR Motorsports	Kalex	7	(Spain) Dani Rivas	1–3
(Spain) TSR Motorsports	Kalex	9	(United Kingdom) Kyle Smith	4–5
(Spain) TSR Motorsports	Kalex	19	(Argentina) Sebastián Porto	6–7
(Spain) TSR Motorsports	Kalex	64	(Colombia) Santiago Hernández	All
(Spain) Amalgama/Team Climent	MIR Racing	16	(Spain) Óscar Climent	4–7
(Spain) MR Griful	MVR	34	(Argentina) Ezequiel Iturrioz	1–4
(Spain) MR Griful	MVR	74	(Argentina) Andrés González	All
(Qatar) QMMF Racing Team	Moriwaki	95	(Qatar) Nasser Al Malki	1–2, 4–6
(Qatar) QMMF Racing Team	Moriwaki	96	(Qatar) Saeed Al Sulaiti	1–2, 4–6
(Spain) Red Racing Moto2	SR–71	71	(Spain) Ferran Casas	4–6
(Italy) Ciatti – Gresini	Speed Up	93	(Italy) Federico Fuligni	7
(Russia) Motorrika	Speed Up	79	(Russia) Maksim Averkin	3
(Russia) Motorrika	Speed Up	80	(Kazakhstan) Iván Lookin	2–5
(Italy) Elle2–Ciatti	Suter	93	(Italy) Federico Fuligni	6
Equipe De France	Suter	60	(France) Lucas Mahias	6–7
(Spain) H43 Team Nobby Talasur Blumaq	Suter	12	(Norway) Thomas Sigvartsen	4
(Spain) H43 Team Nobby Talasur Blumaq	Suter	18	(Australia) Samuel Rankin	4
(Spain) Halcourier MS	Suter	24	(Spain) Ángel Poyatos	2–7
(Spain) Halcourier MS	Suter	59	(Spain) Pedro Rodríguez	All
(Spain) PL Racing Moto2	Suter	73	(Spain) Antonio Alarte	All
(Spain) PL Racing Moto2	Suter	82	(Spain) Elena Rosell	7
(Spain) Targobank Motorsport	Suter	92	(Spain) Álex Mariñelarena	1–4
(Spain) Team Calvo	Suter	9	(United States) Kenny Noyes	1–3
(Spain) Team Calvo	Suter	52	(Argentina) Juan Martin Solorza	All
(France) Transfiormer Team	Transfiormers	53	(France) Valentin Debise	6–7
Superstock 600
(Spain) Tecnica Moto Racing Team	Honda	45	(Italy) Andrea Zappa	6
(Spain) AE19 Basoli Competicio	Kawasaki	19	(Spain) Alejandro Esteban	1–5
(Spain) Bruno Performance	Kawasaki	58	(Spain) Javier Hidalgo	4–7
(Spain) Bruno Performance	Kawasaki	82	(Spain) Elena Rosell	1–4, 6
(Russia) DMC Racing	Kawasaki	61	(Russia) Alexey Ivanov	6–7
(Spain) Kawasaki Palmeto PL Racing Team	Kawasaki	13	(Spain) Santiago Mangas	6–7
(Spain) KRS Team	Kawasaki	48	(Spain) José David Guzmán	7
(Spain) Promoto Sprot Team	Kawasaki	4	(Spain) Alexis González	1–2, 4
(Spain) Red Racing Moto2	Kawasaki	4	(Spain) Alexis González	5–6
(Spain) Transtasa – Macisa	Kawasaki	81	(Spain) Jesús Alconchel	1–5
(Spain) TMR–La Bruixa D'Or	Kawasaki	39	(Spain) Juan Risueño	1–2
(Spain) FC Team 57	Suzuki	71	(Spain) Ferran Casas	7
(Portugal) A.Faria Leite Racing	Yamaha	33	(Portugal) Romeu Leite	3
(Spain) Andalucia Cádiz Pastrana Racing Team	Yamaha	84	(Spain) Jorge Arroyo	All
(Spain) Andalucia Cádiz Pastrana Racing Team	Yamaha	85	(Spain) Abian Angel Santana	6–7
(Italy) Bike E Motor Racing Team	Yamaha	29	(Germany) Julian Puffe	7
(Italy) Bike E Motor Racing Team	Yamaha	35	(Italy) Marco De Luca	7
(Spain) CM Circuito De Albacete	Yamaha	48	(Spain) Joaquin Castañeda	4
(Spain) DAAC Team	Yamaha	14	(Spain) Didac López	1
(Spain) DVRacing–Grup Pons	Yamaha	77	(Spain) Miquel Pons	All
(Spain) Ehaff Racing Team	Yamaha	11	(Spain) Aitor Martínez	1
(Spain) FRICAR Team	Yamaha	85	(Spain) Abian Angel Santana	1–5
(Spain) Hospitality Motobox	Yamaha	23	(Spain) Guillermo Llado	1–3
(Spain) Motomundi	Yamaha	20	(Spain) Raúl Navarro	2
(Spain) Peluca Racing Team	Yamaha	94	(Spain) Pau Tortosa	1
(Spain) Performance First	Yamaha	31	(Spain) Antonio Train	5
(Spain) Petrofer Fly Group	Yamaha	11	(Spain) Aitor Martínez	2–3, 5
(France) PP Promotion	Yamaha	51	(France) Pierre Ginieys	6
(Spain) Team TMT	Yamaha	97	(Spain) Bernat Crespi	3
(Spain) Team Torrento	Yamaha	36	(Spain) Alexander Mateos	7
(France) Tex Racing	Yamaha	46	(France) Pierre Texier	6
(Spain) TMR Competición	Yamaha	31	(Spain) Antonio Train	1–3, 6
(Spain) Transtasa – Macisa	Yamaha	81	(Spain) Jesús Alconchel	6
(Spain) Twenties Motorsport	Yamaha	15	(Spain) Javier Sánchez	2

== Championship standings ==
Pos.	Rider	Bike	CAT (Spain)	ARA (Spain)		ALB1 (Spain)	ALB2 (Spain)	NAV (Spain)		VAL (Spain)	JER (Spain)	Pts
Overall
1	(Spain) Román Ramos	Ariane	2	1^{F}	2	2^{P}	1^{P} ^{F}	3^{P}	2^{P}	3	5	173
2	(Spain) Álex Mariñelarena	Eskil Suter	1^{F}	Ret	3	1	5					167
2	(Spain) Álex Mariñelarena	Kalex						2^{F}	1^{F}	2	1^{P} ^{F}	167
3	(Malaysia) Hafizh Syahrin	Kalex	Ret^{P}	2	4	3	2	1	3	1^{P} ^{F}	2	155
4	(Switzerland) Jesko Raffin	Kalex	7	Ret^{P}	1^{P} ^{F}	4	7	4	4	7	4	104
5	(Spain) Russell Gómez	AJR	3	4	7	5	4	Ret	5	5	9	91
6	(Colombia) Santiago Hernández	Kalex	4	Ret	6	9	10	5	8	4	7	77
7	(Spain) Ángel Poyatos	Suter		5	9	8	6	6	7	6	10	71
8	(Spain) Andrés González	MVR	8	9	17	14	13	8	6	9	12	49
9	(Spain) Óscar Climent	Kalex	23	6	10	7						47
9	(Spain) Óscar Climent	MIR Racing					8	7	19	11	Ret	47
10	(Spain) Edgar Pons	Kalex	11	7	11	Ret	12	9	13	15	8	42
11	(United States) Kenny Noyes	Suter	Ret	3	8	6						34
12	(Spain) Pedro Rodríguez	Suter	14	15	19	12	30	11	9	13	14	24
13	(Spain) Dani Rivas	Kalex	5	Ret	5	Ret^{F}						22
14	(Spain) Elena Rosell	Kawasaki	DSQ	14	Ret	Ret	Ret			8		22
14	(Spain) Elena Rosell	Inmotec						10	10			22
14	(Spain) Elena Rosell	Suter									DNS	22
15	(Argentina) Ezequiel Iturrioz	MVR	13	8	12	11	Ret					20
16	(Spain) Miquel Pons	Yamaha	19	10	13	13	20	12	12	26	DSQ	20
17	(Spain) Jorge Arroyo	Yamaha	9	13	33	15	15	19	11	30	19	17
18	(Argentina) Sebastián Porto	Kalex								Ret	3	16
19	(United Kingdom) Kyle Smith	Kalex					3	Ret	Ret			16
20	(Qatar) Nasser Al Malki	Moriwaki	Ret	12	18		9	14	14	24		15
21	(Spain) Antonio Alarte	Suter	20	Ret	15	10	11	Ret	17	19	Ret	12
22	(Italy) Luca Vitali	Ariane									6	10
23	(Spain) Luis Miguel Mora	AJR	6	17	22	18						10
24	(France) Valentin Debise	Transfiormers								10	13	9
25	(Austria) Lukas Trautmann	IAMT								12	11	9
26	(Spain) Aitor Martínez	Yamaha	18	11	14	25		23	24			7
27	(Spain) Jesús Alconchel	Kawasaki	10	18	23	20	21	20	Ret			6
27	(Spain) Jesús Alconchel	Yamaha								21		6
28	(Spain) Juan Risueño	Kawasaki	12	20	25							4
29	(Spain) Javier Hidalgo	Kawasaki					22	13	16	17	Ret	3
30	(Italy) Federico Fuligni	Suter								14		3
30	(Italy) Federico Fuligni	Speed Up									15	3
31	(Argentina) Juan Martin Solorza	Suter	Ret	Ret	16	Ret	14	15	18	16	Ret	3
32	(Qatar) Saeed Al Sulaiti	Moriwaki	15	22	26		23	16	Ret	23		1
33	(Spain) Ferran Casas	SR–71					Ret	Ret	15	Ret		1
33	(Spain) Ferran Casas	Suzuki									17	1
	(Spain) Alejandro Esteban	Kawasaki	24	16	20	DSQ	16	Ret	DNS			0
	(United Kingdom) James Folkard	FTR					17	Ret	Ret	Ret	16	0
	(Russia) Maksim Averkin	Bottpower	21									0
	(Russia) Maksim Averkin	Speed Up				16						0
	(Spain) Alexis González	Kawasaki	16	21	29		27	Ret	DNS	Ret		0
	(Spain) Christian Vidal	Inmotec	17									0
	(Australia) Samuel Rankin	AJR	Ret	Ret	21	17		21	22	32	22	0
	(Australia) Samuel Rankin	Suter					24					0
	(Spain) Abian Angel Santana	Yamaha	DNQ	26	31	24	25	17	21	28	Ret	0
	(Spain) Alexander Mateos	Yamaha									18	0
	(Spain) Antonio Train	Yamaha	25	23	24	Ret		18	23	22		0
	(Norway) Thomas Sigvartsen	Suter					18					0
	(Norway) Thomas Sigvartsen	Ariane								27		0
	(France) Lucas Mahias	Suter								18	Ret	0
	(Spain) Arturo Tizón	Ariane					19					0
	(Chile) Rodrigo Concha	Ariane	DNQ	19	32	19		22				0
	(Sweden) Robert Gull	Ariane								20	25	0
	(Spain) Santiago Mangas	Kawasaki								Ret	20	0
	(United Kingdom) Markus Woodbine	Harris	22	24	28	21	29			31	21	0
	(Kazakhstan) Iván Lookin	Ariane	DNQ									0
	(Kazakhstan) Iván Lookin	Speed Up		28	Ret	22	28	DNQ	DNQ			0
	(Italy) Marco De Luca	Yamaha									23	0
	(Spain) Guillermo LLano	Yamaha		25	27	23						0
	(Spain) José David Guzmán	Kawasaki									24	0
	(Italy) Andrea Zappa	Honda								25		0
	(Spain) Joaquin Castañeda	Yamaha					26					0
	(Spain) Raúl Navarro	Yamaha		27	30							0
	(France) Pierre Texier	Yamaha								29		0
	(Russia) Alexey Ivanov	Kawasaki								Ret	Ret	0
	(Germany) Jan Bühn	IAMT									Ret	0
	(Germany) Julian Puffe	Yamaha									Ret	0
	(Portugal) Romeu Leite	Yamaha				DSQ						0
	(France) Pierre Ginieys	Yamaha								Ret		0
	(Spain) Bernat Crespi	Yamaha				Ret						0
	(Spain) Pau Tortosa	Yamaha	DNS									
	(Spain) Xeray Vargas	GPE					DNQ					
	(Spain) Javier Sánchez	Yamaha		DNQ	DNQ							
	(Spain) Didac López	Yamaha	DNQ									
Pos.	Rider	Bike	CAT (Spain)	ARA (Spain)		ALB1 (Spain)	ALB2 (Spain)	NAV (Spain)		VAL (Spain)	JER (Spain)	Pts

Colour	Result
Gold	Winner
Silver	Second place
Bronze	Third place
Green	Points classification
Blue	Non-points classification
Blue	Non-classified finish (NC)
Purple	Retired, not classified (Ret)
Red	Did not qualify (DNQ)
Red	Did not pre-qualify (DNPQ)
Black	Disqualified (DSQ)
White	Did not start (DNS)
White	Withdrew (WD)
White	Race cancelled (C)
Blank	Did not practice (DNP)
Blank	Did not arrive (DNA)
Blank	Excluded (EX)

P – Pole position
F – Fastest lap
