= 2010 German motorcycle Grand Prix =

8th round of the 2010 FIM Road Racing World Championship season

(Germany) 2010 German Grand Prix
Race details
- Race 8 of 18 races in the 2010 Grand Prix motorcycle racing season
- Date: 18 July 2010
- Official name: eni Motorrad Grand Prix Deutschland
- Location: Sachsenring
- Course: Permanent racing facility; 3.671 km (2.281 mi)

MotoGP
Pole position
- Rider: (Spain) Jorge Lorenzo
- Time: 1:21.817
Fastest lap
- Rider: (Spain) Dani Pedrosa
- Time: 1:21.882
Podium
- First: (Spain) Dani Pedrosa
- Second: (Spain) Jorge Lorenzo
- Third: (Australia) Casey Stoner

Moto2
Pole position
- Rider: (Italy) Andrea Iannone
- Time: 1:24.982
Fastest lap
- Rider: (Italy) Andrea Iannone
- Time: 1:25.629
Podium
- First: (Spain) Toni Elías
- Second: (Italy) Andrea Iannone
- Third: (Italy) Roberto Rolfo

125cc
Pole position
- Rider: (Spain) Marc Márquez
- Time: 1:26.053
Fastest lap
- Rider: (Spain) Marc Márquez
- Time: 1:28.702
Podium
- First: (Spain) Marc Márquez
- Second: (Japan) Tomoyoshi Koyama
- Third: (Germany) Sandro Cortese

The 2010 German motorcycle Grand Prix was the eighth round of the 2010 Grand Prix motorcycle racing season. It took place on the weekend of 16–18 July 2010 at the Sachsenring, located in Hohenstein-Ernstthal, Germany.

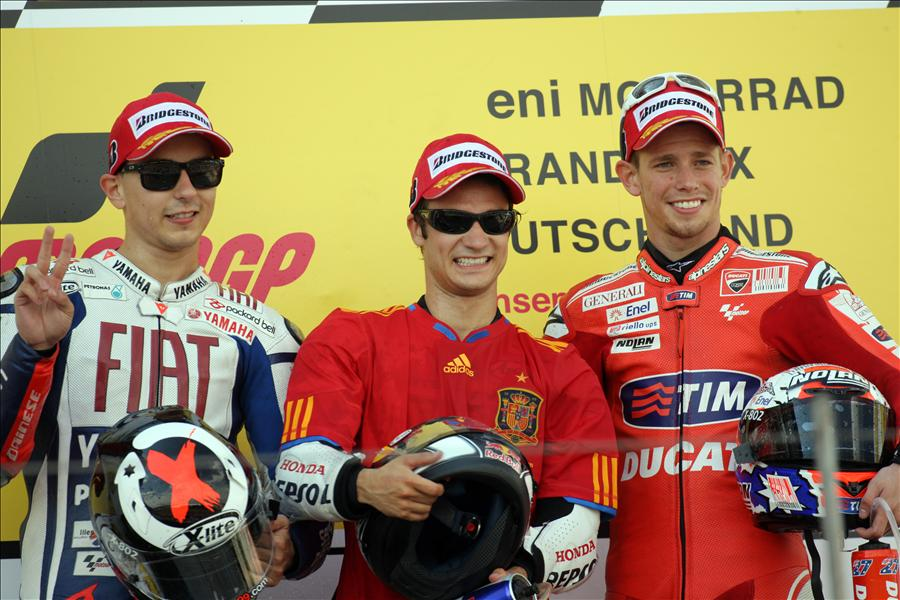
Jorge Lorenzo, Dani Pedrosa and Casey Stoner, celebrating on the podium after finishing second, first and third at the MotoGP race.

== MotoGP classification ==
After a four-round absence due to a broken leg sustained at the Mugello Circuit, Valentino Rossi made his return to the MotoGP grid. A crash between Randy de Puniet, Álvaro Bautista and Aleix Espargaró caused the race to be red-flagged on the 10th lap. All three riders were eligible to make the restart as the results of the first race go back to the last lap therefore showing the riders being classified. However they failed to return to the pits with their bike within five minutes of the race being stopped and therefore were not allowed to make the restart. Colin Edwards retired from the first race before the race was stopped and was ineligible to restart the race. The restarted race was shortened to 21 laps, and grid positions for the second race was based on the classification of the first race.

Pos.	No.	Rider	Team	Manufacturer	Laps	Time/Retired	Grid	Points
1	26	(Spain) Dani Pedrosa	Repsol Honda Team	Honda	21	28:50.476	3	25
2	99	(Spain) Jorge Lorenzo	Fiat Yamaha Team	Yamaha	21	+3.355	1	20
3	27	(Australia) Casey Stoner	Ducati Team	Ducati	21	+5.257	2	16
4	46	(Italy) Valentino Rossi	Fiat Yamaha Team	Yamaha	21	+5.623	5	13
5	4	(Italy) Andrea Dovizioso	Repsol Honda Team	Honda	21	+17.158	4	11
6	58	(Italy) Marco Simoncelli	San Carlo Honda Gresini	Honda	21	+17.757	8	10
7	69	(United States) Nicky Hayden	Ducati Team	Ducati	21	+17.935	15	9
8	11	(United States) Ben Spies	Monster Yamaha Tech 3	Yamaha	21	+20.957	13	8
9	40	(Spain) Héctor Barberá	Páginas Amarillas Aspar	Ducati	21	+22.000	6	7
10	33	(Italy) Marco Melandri	San Carlo Honda Gresini	Honda	21	+35.217	10	6
11	65	(Italy) Loris Capirossi	Rizla Suzuki MotoGP	Suzuki	21	+45.042	14	5
12	15	(San Marino) Alex de Angelis	Interwetten Honda MotoGP	Honda	21	+45.204	17	4
Ret	36	(Finland) Mika Kallio	Pramac Racing Team	Ducati	0	Accident	11	
Ret	14	(France) Randy de Puniet	LCR Honda MotoGP	Honda	0	Accident (Race 1)	7	
Ret	41	(Spain) Aleix Espargaró	Pramac Racing Team	Ducati	0	Collision (Race 1)	9	
Ret	19	(Spain) Álvaro Bautista	Rizla Suzuki MotoGP	Suzuki	0	Collision (Race 1)	16	
Ret	5	(United States) Colin Edwards	Monster Yamaha Tech 3	Yamaha	0	Accident (Race 1)	12	

== Moto2 classification ==
Pos.	No.	Rider	Manufacturer	Laps	Time/Retired	Grid	Points
1	24	(Spain) Toni Elías	Moriwaki	29	41:57.745	3	25
2	29	(Italy) Andrea Iannone	Speed Up	29	+3.297	1	20
3	44	(Italy) Roberto Rolfo	Suter	29	+6.574	12	16
4	10	(Spain) Fonsi Nieto	Moriwaki	29	+6.781	17	13
5	17	(Czech Republic) Karel Abraham	FTR	29	+7.396	11	11
6	2	(Hungary) Gábor Talmácsi	Speed Up	29	+9.555	5	10
7	50	(Australia) Damian Cudlin	Pons Kalex	29	+9.697	22	9
8	77	(Switzerland) Dominique Aegerter	Suter	29	+11.373	9	8
9	65	(Germany) Stefan Bradl	Suter	29	+13.152	7	7
10	68	(Colombia) Yonny Hernández	BQR-Moto2	29	+13.726	14	6
11	25	(Italy) Alex Baldolini	I.C.P.	29	+15.802	16	5
12	16	(France) Jules Cluzel	Suter	29	+17.666	31	4
13	8	(Australia) Anthony West	MZ-RE Honda	29	+25.927	19	3
14	61	(Ukraine) Vladimir Ivanov	Moriwaki	29	+26.476	28	2
15	19	(Belgium) Xavier Siméon	Moriwaki	29	+26.626	25	1
16	53	(France) Valentin Debise	ADV	29	+27.465	36	
17	14	(Thailand) Ratthapark Wilairot	Bimota	29	+29.007	18	
18	48	(Japan) Shoya Tomizawa	Suter	29	+42.961	8	
19	11	(Japan) Yusuke Teshima	Motobi	29	+43.141	30	
20	59	(Italy) Niccolò Canepa	Force GP210	29	+43.277	39	
21	9	(United States) Kenny Noyes	Promoharris	29	+43.580	35	
22	71	(Italy) Claudio Corti	Suter	29	+44.171	23	
23	32	(Germany) Sascha Hommel	Kalex	29	+52.382	29	
24	21	(Russia) Vladimir Leonov	Suter	29	+1:04.234	37	
25	55	(Spain) Héctor Faubel	Suter	29	+1:19.211	27	
26	88	(Spain) Yannick Guerra	Moriwaki	29	+1'23.078	41	
27	41	(Germany) Arne Tode	Suter	29	+1:28.151	2	
Ret	63	(France) Mike Di Meglio	Suter	28	Accident	20	
Ret	35	(Italy) Raffaele De Rosa	Tech 3	25	Retirement	24	
Ret	39	(Venezuela) Robertino Pietri	Suter	24	Accident	38	
Ret	3	(Italy) Simone Corsi	Motobi	19	Accident	6	
Ret	95	(Qatar) Mashel Al Naimi	BQR-Moto2	17	Retirement	40	
Ret	45	(United Kingdom) Scott Redding	Suter	10	Retirement	15	
Ret	6	(Spain) Alex Debón	FTR	10	Accident	10	
Ret	12	(Switzerland) Thomas Lüthi	Moriwaki	9	Collision	21	
Ret	40	(Spain) Sergio Gadea	Pons Kalex	7	Accident	32	
Ret	60	(Spain) Julián Simón	Suter	3	Accident	4	
Ret	72	(Japan) Yuki Takahashi	Tech 3	1	Accident	13	
Ret	4	(Spain) Ricard Cardús	Bimota	0	Collision	26	
Ret	5	(Spain) Joan Olivé	Promoharris	0	Collision	34	
Ret	52	(Czech Republic) Lukáš Pešek	Moriwaki	0	Collision	33	
OFFICIAL MOTO2 REPORT

== 125 cc classification ==
Pos.	No.	Rider	Manufacturer	Laps	Time/Retired	Grid	Points
1	93	(Spain) Marc Márquez	Derbi	27	41:28.274	1	25
2	71	(Japan) Tomoyoshi Koyama	Aprilia	27	+17.578	7	20
3	11	(Germany) Sandro Cortese	Derbi	27	+18.263	4	16
4	12	(Spain) Esteve Rabat	Aprilia	27	+19.098	9	13
5	38	(United Kingdom) Bradley Smith	Aprilia	27	+19.713	3	11
6	14	(France) Johann Zarco	Aprilia	27	+44.976	8	10
7	99	(United Kingdom) Danny Webb	Aprilia	27	+53.243	10	9
8	7	(Spain) Efrén Vázquez	Derbi	27	+53.302	6	8
9	50	(Norway) Sturla Fagerhaug	Aprilia	27	+53.589	22	7
10	61	(Germany) Daniel Kartheininger	KTM	27	+1:05.078	26	6
11	35	(Switzerland) Randy Krummenacher	Aprilia	27	+1:13.484	5	5
12	32	(Italy) Lorenzo Savadori	Aprilia	27	+1:13.719	25	4
13	5	(France) Alexis Masbou	Aprilia	27	+1:21.679	14	3
14	78	(Germany) Marcel Schrötter	Honda	26	+1 lap	15	2
15	63	(Malaysia) Zulfahmi Khairuddin	Aprilia	26	+1 lap	20	1
16	94	(Germany) Jonas Folger	Aprilia	26	+1 lap	11	
17	84	(Czech Republic) Jakub Kornfeil	Aprilia	26	+1 lap	16	
18	86	(Germany) Kevin Hanus	Honda	23	+4 laps	30	
Ret	44	(Spain) Pol Espargaró	Derbi	24	Accident	2	
Ret	60	(Netherlands) Michael van der Mark	Lambretta	23	Retirement	23	
Ret	53	(Netherlands) Jasper Iwema	Aprilia	16	Retirement	12	
Ret	15	(Italy) Simone Grotzkyj	Aprilia	15	Collision	17	
Ret	68	(Germany) Toni Finsterbusch	KTM	15	Collision	18	
Ret	26	(Spain) Adrián Martín	Aprilia	14	Accident	19	
Ret	87	(Italy) Luca Marconi	Aprilia	10	Retirement	27	
Ret	69	(France) Louis Rossi	Aprilia	8	Retirement	24	
Ret	62	(Germany) Marvin Fritz	Honda	7	Retirement	29	
Ret	85	(Germany) Eric Hübsch	Aprilia	6	Retirement	28	
Ret	72	(Italy) Marco Ravaioli	Lambretta	4	Accident	31	
Ret	23	(Spain) Alberto Moncayo	Aprilia	2	Accident	13	
Ret	39	(Spain) Luis Salom	Aprilia	0	Retirement	21	
OFFICIAL 125CC REPORT

== Championship standings after the race (MotoGP) ==
Below are the standings for the top five riders and constructors after round eight has concluded.

Riders' Championship standings

Pos.	Rider	Points
1	(Spain) Jorge Lorenzo	185
2	(Spain) Dani Pedrosa	138
3	(Italy) Andrea Dovizioso	102
4	(Australia) Casey Stoner	83
5	(United States) Nicky Hayden	78

Constructors' Championship standings

Pos.	Constructor	Points
1	(Japan) Yamaha	190
2	(Japan) Honda	162
3	(Italy) Ducati	113
4	(Japan) Suzuki	42

- Note: Only the top five positions are included for both sets of standings.

Previous race: 2010 Catalan Grand Prix	FIM Grand Prix World Championship; 2010 season	Next race: 2010 United States Grand Prix
Previous race: 2009 German Grand Prix	German motorcycle Grand Prix	Next race: 2011 German Grand Prix
