= Román Ramos =

Spanish motorcycle racer

- Nationality: Spanish
- Born: 6 January 1991 (age 35); Santa María de Cayón, Spain
- Bike number: 40
Motorcycle racing career statistics
Moto2 World Championship
Active years	2010, 2012–2014
Manufacturers	MIR Racing, FTR, Speed Up, Motobi
Championships	0
2014 championship position	NC (0 pts)
Starts / Wins / Podiums / Poles / F. laps / Points; 23 / 0 / 0 / 0 / 0 / 0
Superbike World Championship
Active years	2015–2018, 2020
Manufacturers	Kawasaki
Championships	0
2020 championship position	25th (4 pts)
Starts / Wins / Podiums / Poles / F. laps / Points; 105 / 0 / 0 / 0 / 0 / 347

Román Ramos Álvaro (born 6 January 1991) is a Spanish motorcycle racer. During 2018, he rode for Team Go Eleven on a Kawasaki, until losing the ride to Eugene Laverty. He has also competed in the Moto2 World Championship, the CEV Supersport Championship, the Spanish Kawasaki Ninja Cup (which he won in 2007) and the CEV Moto2 Championship, which he won in 2013; that same year, he also won the European Supersport title.

== Career statistics ==
2008 - NC, European Superstock 600 Championship, Kawasaki ZX-6R

=== European Superstock 600 ===
==== Races by year ====
(key) (Races in bold indicate pole position, races in italics indicate fastest lap)

Year	Bike	1	2	3	4	5	6	7	8	9	10	Pos	Pts
2008	Kawasaki	VAL	ASS	MNZ	NÜR	MIS	BRN; 23	BRA; 30	DON	MAG	POR	NC	0

=== Grand Prix motorcycle racing ===
==== By season ====
Season	Class	Motorcycle	Team	Race	Win	Podium	Pole	FLap	Pts	Plcd
2010	Moto2	MIR Racing	MIR Racing	2	0	0	0	0	0	NC
2012	Moto2	FTR	SAG Team	1	0	0	0	0	0	NC
2013	Moto2	Speed Up	Argiñano & Ginés Racing	2	0	0	0	0	0	NC
2013	Moto2	Motobi	JiR Moto2	2	0	0	0	0	0	NC
2014	Moto2	Speed Up	QMMF Racing Team	18	0	0	0	0	0	NC
Total				**23**	**0**	**0**	**0**	**0**	**0**	

==== Races by year ====
(key) (Races in bold indicate pole position, races in italics indicate fastest lap)

Year	Class	Bike	1	2	3	4	5	6	7	8	9	10	11	12	13	14	15	16	17	18	Pos	Pts
2010	Moto2	MIR Racing	QAT	SPA	FRA	ITA	GBR	NED	CAT	GER	CZE	INP	RSM	ARA; 16	JPN	MAL	AUS	POR	VAL; 23		NC	0
2012	Moto2	FTR	QAT	SPA	POR	FRA	CAT	GBR	NED	GER	ITA	INP	CZE	RSM	ARA	JPN	MAL	AUS	VAL; 26		NC	0
2013	Moto2	Speed Up	QAT	AME	SPA	FRA	ITA	CAT	NED	GER; Ret	INP	CZE	GBR	RSM							NC	0
2013	Moto2	Motobi													ARA; 20	MAL	AUS	JPN	VAL		NC	0
2014	Moto2	Speed Up	QAT; 19	AME; 21	ARG; 22	SPA; 23	FRA; 23	ITA; 29	CAT; 17	NED; 19	GER; 23	INP; 19	CZE; 27	GBR; 26	RSM; 27	ARA; 18	JPN; 27	AUS; 23	MAL; 22	VAL; 25	NC	0

=== Superbike World Championship ===
==== Races by year ====
(key) (Races in bold indicate pole position, races in italics indicate fastest lap)

Year	Bike	1		2		3		4		5		6		7		8		9		10		11		12		13		Pos	Pts
Year	Bike	R1	R2	R1	R2	R1	R2	R1	R2	R1	R2	R1	R2	R1	R2	R1	R2	R1	R2	R1	R2	R1	R2	R1	R2	R1	R2	Pos	Pts
2015	Kawasaki	AUS; 16	AUS; 10	THA; 15	THA; 14	SPA; 13	SPA; 12	NED; 13	NED; 15	ITA; 11	ITA; 7	GBR; 13	GBR; 11	POR; 16	POR; 11	ITA; 14	ITA; 14	USA; 12	USA; 12	MAL; 14	MAL; 10	SPA; 13	SPA; Ret	FRA; 15	FRA; 16	QAT; Ret	QAT; Ret	15th	71
2016	Kawasaki	AUS; 11	AUS; 12	THA; 12	THA; 12	SPA; 12	SPA; 12	NED; 9	NED; 12	ITA; WD	ITA; WD	MAL	MAL	GBR; 13	GBR; 13	ITA; 9	ITA; 12	USA; 15	USA; 10	GER; 13	GER; 9	FRA; 13	FRA; 13	SPA; 12	SPA; 11	QAT; 14	QAT; 14	15th	89
2017	Kawasaki	AUS; 13	AUS; 14	THA; 15	THA; 9	SPA; Ret	SPA; 11	NED; 7	NED; 11	ITA; 9	ITA; 11	GBR; 11	GBR; 8	ITA; 8	ITA; Ret	USA; 12	USA; 12	GER; 14	GER; 14	POR; 10	POR; 15	FRA; 12	FRA; 9	SPA; 10	SPA; 11	QAT; 10	QAT; 10	12th	118
2018	Kawasaki	AUS; 14	AUS; 11	THA; 14	THA; 13	SPA; 10	SPA; 11	NED; 11	NED; Ret	ITA; Ret	ITA; 12	GBR; 19	GBR; Ret	CZE; 13	CZE; 10	USA; 12	USA; 12	ITA; 13	ITA; 15	POR; 14	POR; Ret	FRA; 15	FRA; 18	ARG; 12	ARG; 13	QAT; 14	QAT; C	16th	65

Year	Bike	1			2			3			4			5			6			7			8			Pos	Pts
Year	Bike	R1	SR	R2	R1	SR	R2	R1	SR	R2	R1	SR	R2	R1	SR	R2	R1	SR	R2	R1	SR	R2	R1	SR	R2	Pos	Pts
2020	Kawasaki	AUS	AUS	AUS	SPA	SPA	SPA	POR	POR	POR	SPA; 13	SPA; 19	SPA; Ret	SPA; Ret	SPA; 20	SPA; 15	SPA	SPA	SPA	FRA	FRA	FRA	POR	POR	POR	25th	4

=== FIM Moto2 European Championship ===
==== Races by year ====
(key) (Races in bold indicate pole position; races in italics indicate fastest lap)

Year	Bike	1	2	3	4	5	6	7	8	9	10	11	Pos	Pts
2025	Kalex	EST	EST	JER	MAG	MAG	ARA	ARA	MIS	CAT	CAT	VAL	NC*	0*

* Season still in progress.

=== FIM Endurance World Championship ===
Year	Team	Bike	Tyre	Rider	Pts	TC
2025	(France) Kawasaki WeBike Trickstar	Kawasaki ZX-10R	**B**	(Spain) Román Ramos (France) Mike Di Meglio (France) Grégory Leblanc	70*	3rd*

=== Suzuka 8 Hours results ===
Year	Class	Team	Co-riders	Bike	Pos
2025	**EWC**	(France) Kawasaki Webike Tristar	(France) Mike Di Meglio (France) Grégory Leblanc	Kawasaki ZX-10R	8th
2026	**EWC**	(France) Kawasaki Webike Tristar	(Italy) Christian Gamarino (France) Grégory Leblanc	Kawasaki ZX-10RR	TBD

Sporting positions
Preceded by Jordi Torres	CEV Moto2 Champion; 2013	Succeeded by Jesko Raffin
Preceded by Jordi Torres	European Supersport Champion; 2013	Succeeded by Axel Bassani
