= Johann Zarco =

French motorcycle racer (born 1990)

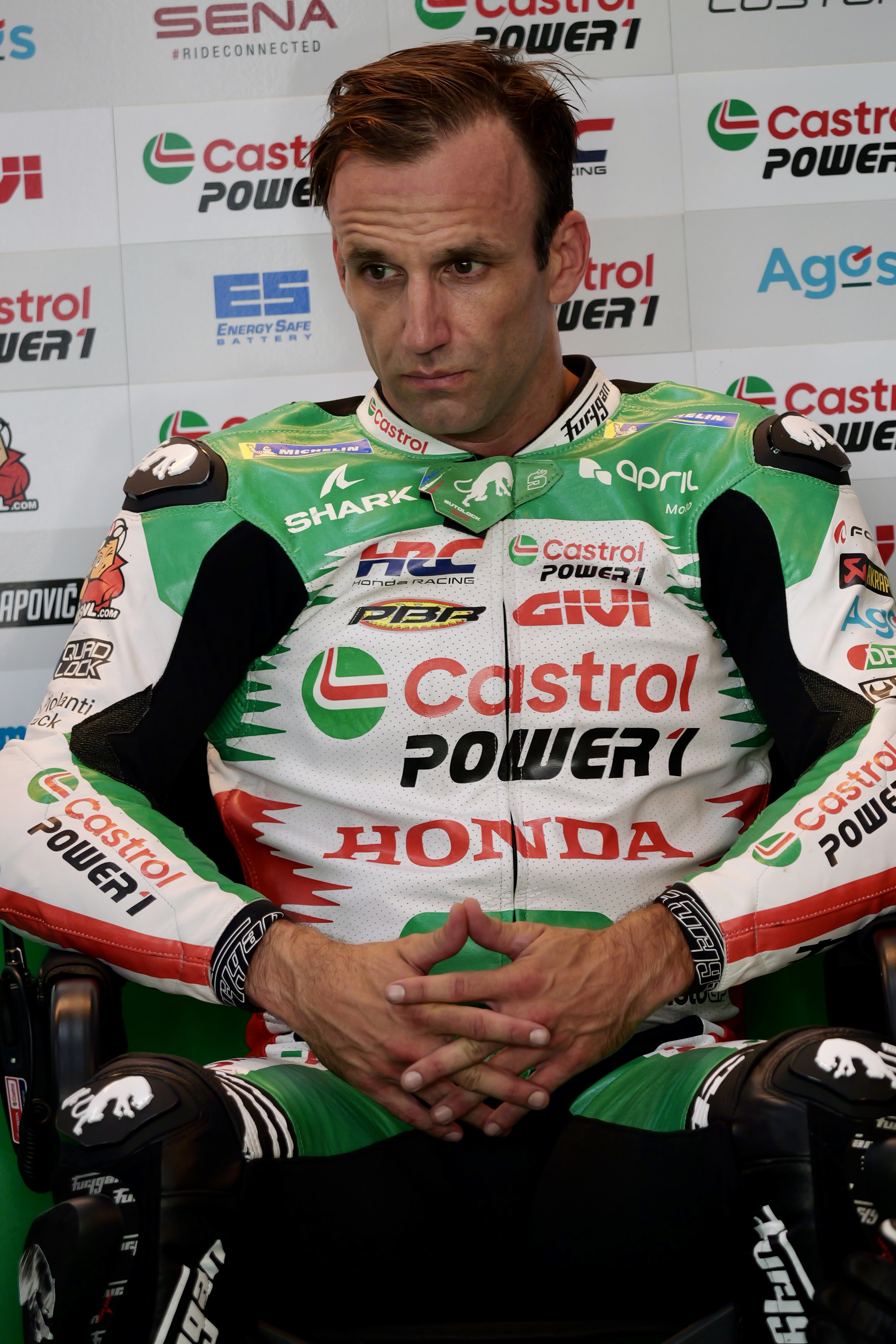
- Zarco at the 2025 Malaysian Grand Prix
- Nationality: French
- Born: 16 July 1990 (age 36); Cannes, France
- Current team: Castrol Honda LCR
- Bike number: 5
Motorcycle racing career statistics
MotoGP World Championship
Active years	2017–
Manufacturers	Yamaha (2017–2018); KTM (2019); Honda (2019, 2024–); Ducati (2020–2023)
Championships	0
2025 championship position	12th (148 pts)
Starts / Wins / Podiums / Poles / F. laps / Points; 166 / 2 / 23 / 8 / 11 / 1206
Moto2 World Championship
Active years	2012–2016
Manufacturers	Motobi (2012); Suter (2013); Caterham Suter (2014); Kalex (2015–2016)
Championships	2 (2015, 2016)
2016 championship position	1st (276 pts)
Starts / Wins / Podiums / Poles / F. laps / Points; 88 / 15 / 30 / 15 / 7 / 1010
125cc World Championship
Active years	2009–2011
Manufacturers	Aprilia (2009–2010); Derbi (2011)
Championships	0
2011 championship position	2nd (262 pts)
Starts / Wins / Podiums / Poles / F. laps / Points; 50 / 1 / 11 / 4 / 5 / 371.5

Johann Sylvain Pierre Zarco (born 16 July 1990) is a French Grand Prix motorcycle racer, best known for winning the 2015 and 2016 Moto2 World Championships with his 2015 triumph being a record points total for the intermediate class. He is a MotoGP race winner, and currently rides for Castrol Honda LCR in MotoGP.

Zarco is also a former runner-up and race winner in 125 cc class (now converted to Moto3) in 2011, and won the rookie and top independent rider of the year in MotoGP in 2017 with Monster Yamaha Tech3 finishing 6th with 3 podiums and 2 Pole Positions. With 18 Grand Prix victories across all classes and two Moto2 championships, Zarco is one of the most successful French riders in Grand Prix racing history.

== Career ==
=== Early career ===
Born in Cannes, Zarco progressed up the motorcycling ladder and moved into minimoto championships in 2004, mainly based in Italy. In 2005, Zarco finished as runner-up in the Senior Mini European Championship and in 2006, he was runner-up in the European Open Championship. He also competed in the Italian 125cc championship, where he finished in twelfth place. Zarco took part in the Red Bull Rookies Cup in 2007, and won the championship at Estoril, after winning three races. He added a fourth win at the final race in Valencia. These performances enabled Zarco to become part of the Red Bull MotoGP Academy scheme along with Cameron Beaubier, Jonas Folger and Danny Kent. This reduced his racing in 2008, making a sporadic appearance in the Italian championship with Team Gabrielli.

=== 125cc World Championship ===
==== WTR San Marino (2009–2010) ====
Zarco made his Grand Prix début with the WTR San Marino Team, in the season-opening Qatar Grand Prix. He finished the race in the points in 15th, although the rain-shortened race meant that Zarco gained just half a point. He took seven further points-scoring finishes, as he finished 20th in the championship. Zarco's best result of the season was a sixth-place finish at Mugello.

Zarco remained with WTR for the 2010 season. Zarco started the season with a consistent run of points-scoring finishes, finishing each of the first eight races in the points. At the Czech Grand Prix, Zarco recorded the first fastest lap of his career, having pitted for slick tyres as the track's conditions became better for them to be run. He ultimately finished eleventh in the championship, despite retiring from the final three races.

==== Ajo Motorsport (2011) ====
For 2011, Zarco signed with Ajo Motorsport. At the second race, the Spanish Grand Prix, he gained his first podium finish by finishing third.

=== Moto2 World Championship ===
==== JiR Team (2012) ====
Zarco moved up to the Moto2 class with the JiR team, aboard Motobi bikes in 2012. He finished the season tenth in the standings with 95 points and was easily the highest placed rookie that year.

==== Ioda Project Racing Team (2013) ====
In 2013, Zarco moved to the Ioda Project Racing Team aboard a Suter, he improved on his rookie season by finishing on the podium twice and ended ninth on the standings with 141 points.

==== Caterham Moto Racing Team (2014) ====
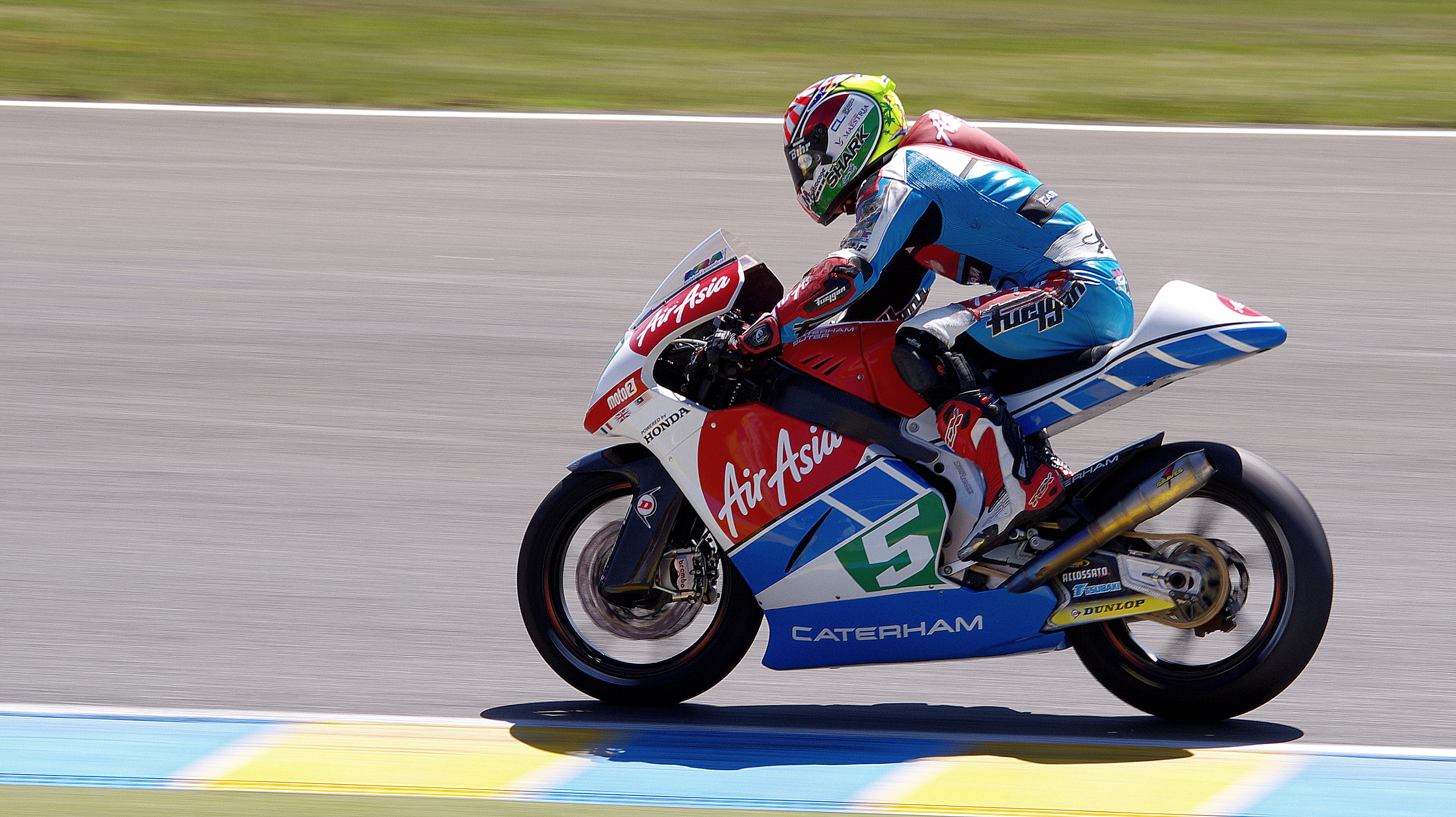
Johann Zarco at the 2014 French Grand Prix

For 2014, Zarco joined the new Caterham Moto Racing team. He impressed on what many considered to be an inferior bike compared to the mainly dominant Kalex bikes. He managed to earn four podium finishes, as well as one pole position, earning him sixth in the standings with 146 points.

==== Ajo Motorsport (2015–2016) ====
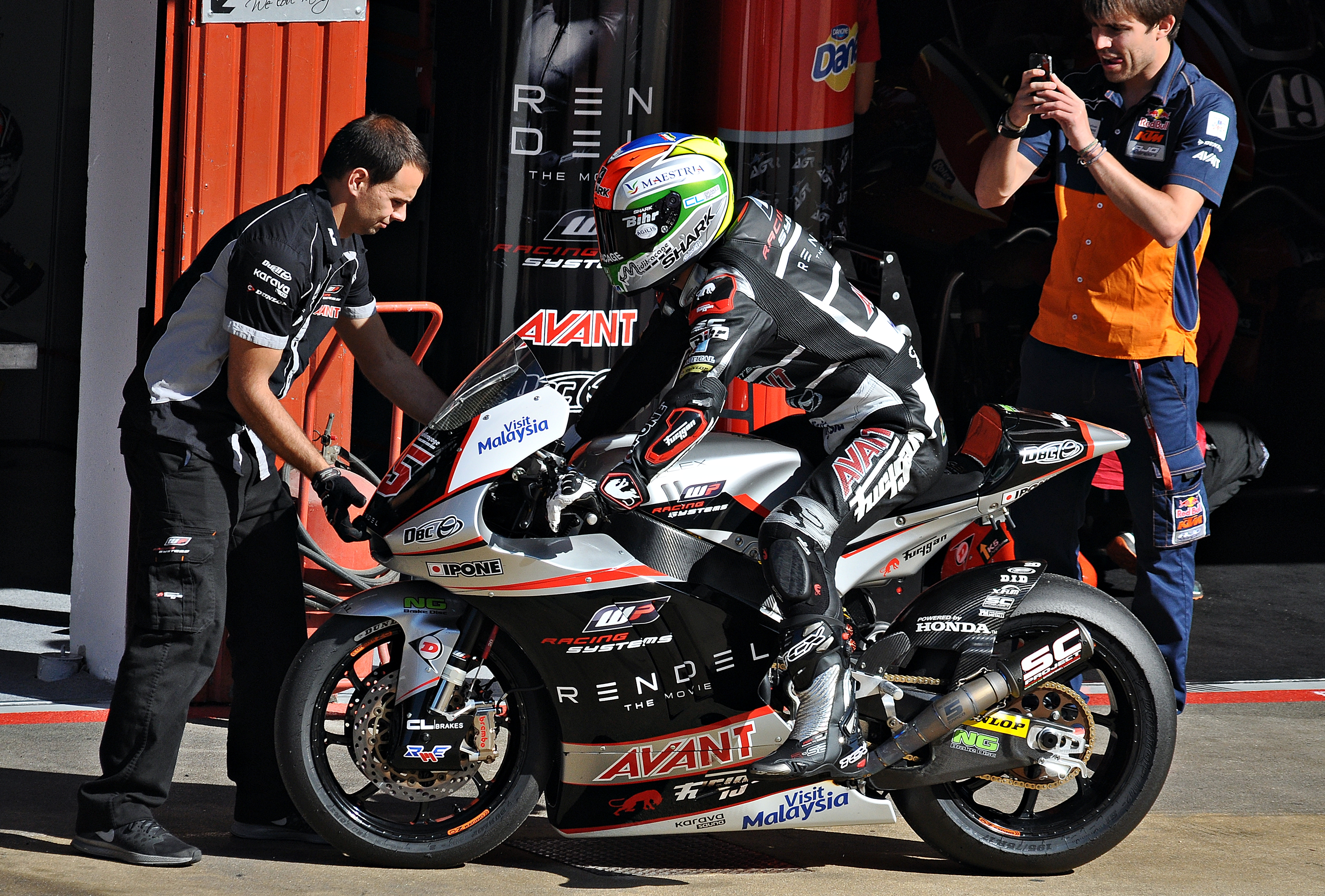
Zarco at the 2015 Catalan Grand Prix

In 2015, Zarco moved to the debuting Ajo Motorsport team, who he raced with in the 125cc class. Zarco dominated the field and won his first Moto2 title, with eight wins, 14 podiums, seven poles and a record points haul of 352.

Zarco remained with the team for 2016 and successfully defended his Moto2 title, becoming the first rider in the Moto2 era to win two intermediate titles, with seven wins, ten podiums, seven poles and 276 points. Zarco became a popular figure with the fans with his spectacular backflip celebrations when he won a race. During the 2016 season, Zarco got his first taste of MotoGP machinery, testing the Suzuki GSX-RR with Suzuki Ecstar in a private test at track in Ruyo, Japan.

=== MotoGP World Championship ===
==== Team Suzuki Ecstar (testing 2016) ====
Zarco signed a pre-contract with Team Suzuki Ecstar in 2016 before the recruitment for 2017 was carried out. Zarco tested with Suzuki in a private test at the Suzuka Circuit, Japan. Ultimately, Alex Rins was chosen to replace the departing Aleix Espargaro, while Andrea Iannone was chosen to replace the Movistar Yamaha MotoGP-bound Maverick Vinales.

==== Monster Yamaha Tech3 (2017–2018) ====
===== 2017 =====
For 2017, Zarco moved up to the premier class with the Tech3 Yamaha team. On his MotoGP debut at Qatar, Zarco shocked the grid by taking the lead on the first lap and building a two-second lead, until he crashed out at turn 2 on lap 6. He scored his first MotoGP podium, a second place, at Le Mans. He got his first pole position at Assen. In the race, he touched with Rossi and dropped to fourth, and eventually finished in 14th place. Zarco again started from pole at the Japanese Grand Prix, but ultimately finished the race in eighth place. He achieved podium finishes in Sepang (Malaysia) and Valencia (Spain) where he finished in third and second respectively. He received the Rookie of the Year Award for 2017 and finished the season in sixth, the highest placed independent rider.

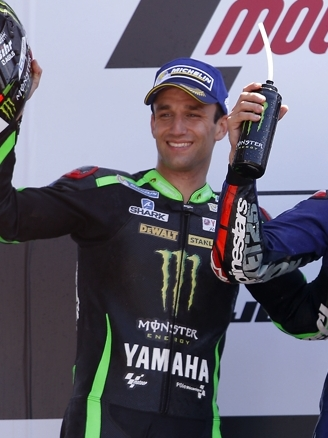
Zarco at the 2017 French Grand Prix

===== 2018 =====
In 2018, Zarco started the season with a pole position in Qatar, before dropping to finish eighth. He finished second in the Argentinian and Spanish Grands Prix, and achieved another pole position at his home French Grand Prix before crashing out of the race. In Malaysia, he repeated his third place podium finish from the previous year, and again finished sixth in the rider's championship standings.

==== Red Bull KTM Factory Racing (early 2019) ====
In early 2018, it was announced that Zarco would ride for the factory KTM team on a two-year contract from 2019. Following a difficult start to 2019 season where he struggled, managing barely to finish within the points-scoring positions, Zarco and KTM made the shock announcement at their home Austrian Grand Prix that they had reached a mutual agreement to end Zarco's contract prematurely at the end of the season. Despite initial intentions to complete the season with Zarco, KTM elected to release him unconditionally two races later after the Misano Grand Prix and replace him with test rider Mika Kallio for the remainder of the season, citing "lost hope" in the situation with Zarco's "negative attitude" before his impending departure.

==== LCR Honda (late 2019) ====
Zarco was offered a Honda for the last three races of the 2019 season due to regular rider Takaaki Nakagami electing to have surgery with an expected long recuperation period. He finished the first event in 13th place, and was knocked off by Joan Mir nearing the end of the second event when in eighth place. Zarco fell during his third race on the Honda when in tenth position at Valencia, Spain, being hit when walking away by a following machine, without serious injury.

==== Avintia Esponsorama Racing (2020) ====
For the 2020 season, Zarco signed a one-year deal through Ducati to ride for Esponsorama Racing. During the Czech Grand Prix in Brno, Zarco took Esponsorama's first ever pole position, followed up with a podium finish in third a day later. Consistently finishing within the points, Zarco ended the season in 13th position of the riders' standings.

==== Pramac Racing (2021–2023) ====
===== 2021 =====
Zarco signed a deal with Pramac Racing in September 2020 for the 2021 season. Zarco had a strong season in 2021 including career highs in podiums and the highest points total of any of his seasons in MotoGP. He ultimately finished fifth in the championship.

===== 2022 =====
Zarco remained with Pramac Racing for 2022. Zarco claimed four podiums, and ended eighth in the standings.

===== 2023 =====
Pramac Racing retained Zarco for a third successive year in 2023. In Australia, after 120 races, Zarco won his first race in MotoGP, overtaking teammate Jorge Martin on the final lap

==== Return to LCR Honda (2024–) ====
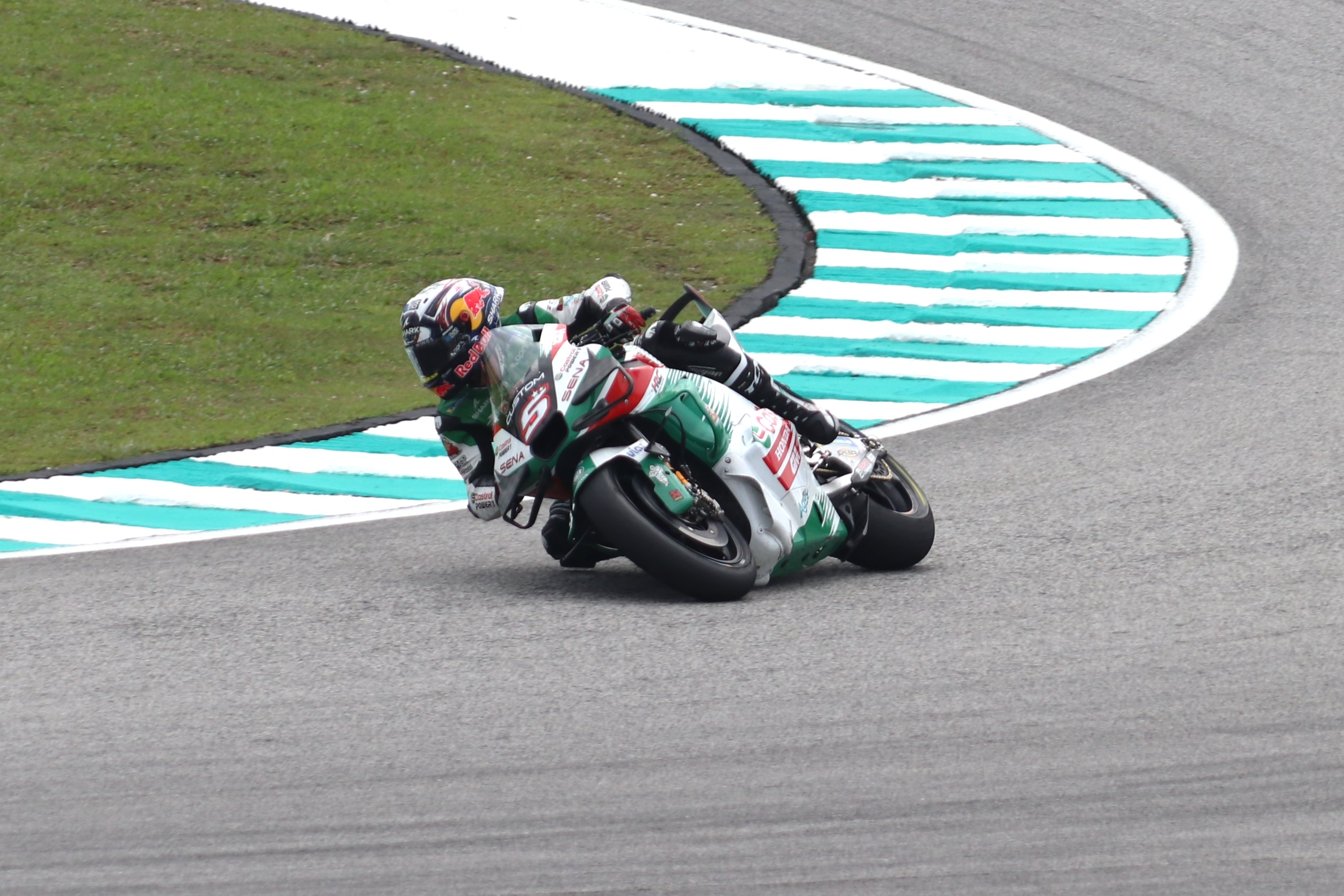
Zarco at the 2024 Malaysian Grand Prix

On 21 August 2023, Zarco announced that he would leave Pramac Racing after spending three seasons with the team. He moved to LCR Honda for the 2024 season, replacing Yamaha-bound Álex Rins. The likely reason for the move was Ducati only intending to give Zarco a one-year contract before moving him to the Superbike World Championship in 2025, whereas LCR Honda were offering a two-year deal. LCR Honda officially confirmed the next day that Zarco would be joining the team in 2024. On the opening round of the season in the 2024 Qatar motorcycle Grand Prix, he finished 12th in the main race. He did the same result at his home race on the 2024 French motorcycle Grand Prix on the layer of the Bugatti Circuit. With regular points finishes throughout the season, he finished the season in 17th position, ahead of teammate Takaaki Nakagami and both factory riders, as the top Honda rider of the season.

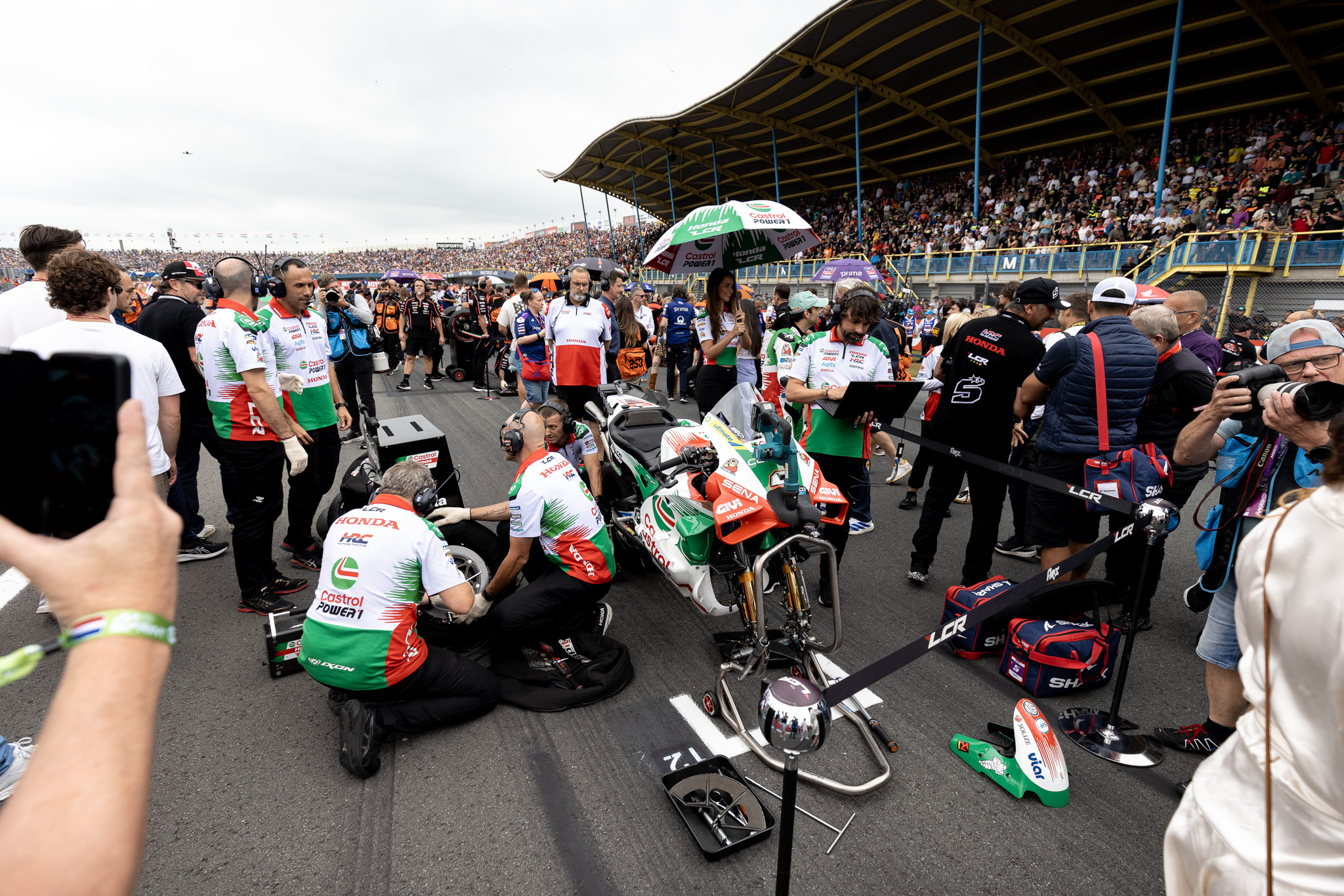
Zarco bike at the 2025 Dutch TT

As Nakagami took on a test role at Honda, Zarco's teammate for 2025 was confirmed to be Somkiat Chantra. At the 2025 French GP, Zarco became the first French rider in 71 years to win on home soil, and the first non-Ducati rider to win a feature race for 22 races, since Maverick Viñales at the 2024 Americas Grand Prix and the first Honda rider to win since Álex Rins at the 2023 Americas Grand Prix. In the following race at Silverstone, Zarco finished second, marking the first back-to-back podium for any Honda rider since Marc Márquez in 2021. He would finish the season 12th in the standings as the highest placed Honda rider.

In September 2025, Zarco extended his contract with LCR Honda for the 2026 and 2027 seasons.

=== Suzuka 8 Hours ===
In 2025, Honda's factory team line-up for the prestigious Suzuka 8 Hours endurance race in August will consist of only two riders, local rider Takumi Takahashi and French LCR-Honda MotoGP rider Johann Zarco, the team announced on social media, citing "procedural reasons." This is because Xavi Vierge, who was planned to replace the injured Iker Lecuona, was denied a visa.

== Career statistics ==
=== Red Bull MotoGP Rookies Cup ===
==== Races by year ====
(key) (Races in bold indicate pole position, races in italics indicate fastest lap)

Year	1	2	3	4	5	6	7	8	Pos	Pts
2007	SPA; 3	**ITA**; 1	GBR; 2	**NED**; 13	**GER**; 2	CZE; 1	**POR**; 1	VAL; 1	1st	159

=== Grand Prix motorcycle racing ===
==== By season ====
Season	Class	Motorcycle	Team	Race	Win	Podium	Pole	FLap	Pts	Plcd	WCh
2009	125cc	Aprilia	WTR San Marino Team	16	0	0	0	0	32.5	20th	–
2010	125cc	Aprilia	WTR San Marino Team	17	0	0	0	1	77	11th	–
2011	125cc	Derbi	Avant-AirAsia-Ajo	17	1	11	4	4	262	**2nd**	–
2012	Moto2	Motobi	JiR Moto2	17	0	0	0	0	95	10th	–
2013	Moto2	Suter	Came IodaRacing Project	17	0	2	0	2	141	9th	–
2014	Moto2	Caterham Suter	AirAsia Caterham	18	0	4	1	0	146	6th	–
2015	Moto2	Kalex	Ajo Motorsport	18	8	14	7	1	352	**1st**	1
2016	Moto2	Kalex	Ajo Motorsport	18	7	10	7	4	276	**1st**	1
2017	MotoGP	Yamaha	Monster Yamaha Tech3	18	0	3	2	4	174	6th	–
2018	MotoGP	Yamaha	Monster Yamaha Tech3	18	0	3	2	0	158	6th	–
2019	MotoGP	KTM	Red Bull KTM Factory Racing	13	0	0	0	0	27	18th	–
2019	MotoGP	Honda	LCR Honda Idemitsu	3	0	0	0	0	3	18th	–
2020	MotoGP	Ducati	Avintia Esponsorama Racing	14	0	1	1	1	77	13th	–
2021	MotoGP	Ducati	Pramac Racing	18	0	4	1	2	173	5th	–
2022	MotoGP	Ducati	Pramac Racing	20	0	4	2	2	166	8th	–
2023	MotoGP	Ducati	Prima Pramac Racing	20	1	6	0	2	225	5th	–
2024	MotoGP	Honda	Castrol Honda LCR	20	0	0	0	0	55	17th	–
2025	MotoGP	Honda	Castrol Honda LCR	22	1	2	0	0	148	12th	–
Total				**304**	**18**	**64**	**27**	**23**	**2587.5**		**2**

==== By class ====
Class	Seasons	1st GP	1st pod	1st win	Race	Win	Podiums	Pole	FLap	Pts	WChmp
125cc	2009–2011	2009 Qatar	2011 Spain	2011 Japan	50	1	11	4	5	371.5	0
Moto2	2012–2016	2012 Qatar	2013 Italy	2015 Argentina	88	15	30	15	7	1010	2
MotoGP	2017–present	2017 Qatar	2017 France	2023 Australia	166	2	23	8	11	1206	0
Total	2009–present				**304**	**18**	**64**	**27**	**23**	**2587.5**	**2**

==== Races by year ====
(key) (Races in bold indicate pole position, races in italics indicate fastest lap)

Year	Class	Bike	1	2	3	4	5	6	7	8	9	10	11	12	13	14	15	16	17	18	19	20	21	22	Pos	Pts
2009	125cc	Aprilia	QAT; 15	JPN; Ret	SPA; 13	FRA; Ret	ITA; 6	CAT; 13	NED; 21	GER; 23	GBR; 13	CZE; 11	INP; 23	RSM; 16	POR; 9	AUS; 16	MAL; Ret	VAL; 15							20th	32.5
2010	125cc	Aprilia	QAT; 12	SPA; 7	FRA; 11	ITA; 9	GBR; 8	NED; 12	CAT; 8	GER; 6	CZE; 19	INP; 13	RSM; 12	ARA; 12	JPN; 10	MAL; 11	AUS; Ret	POR; Ret	VAL; Ret						11th	77
2011	125cc	Derbi	QAT; 6	SPA; 3	POR; 3	FRA; 5	CAT; 6	GBR; 2	NED; 5	**ITA**; 2	GER; 2	CZE; 2	INP; 5	**RSM**; 2	ARA; 2	**JPN**; 1	**AUS**; 3	MAL; 3	VAL; Ret						2nd	262
2012	Moto2	Motobi	QAT; 12	SPA; 10	POR; 4	FRA; Ret	CAT; 11	GBR; Ret	NED; 8	GER; 11	ITA; 10	INP; 12	CZE; 7	RSM; 10	ARA; 6	JPN; 8	MAL; Ret	AUS; 5	VAL; Ret						10th	95
2013	Moto2	Suter	QAT; 12	AME; 6	SPA; 12	FRA; 5	ITA; 3	CAT; 7	NED; 6	GER; 11	INP; 8	CZE; 5	GBR; 7	RSM; 7	ARA; 7	MAL; 6	AUS; Ret	JPN; Ret	VAL; 3						9th	141
2014	Moto2	Caterham Suter	QAT; 23	AME; Ret	ARG; 18	SPA; 8	FRA; Ret	ITA; 7	CAT; 3	NED; 4	GER; Ret	INP; 10	CZE; 9	**GBR**; 4	RSM; 3	ARA; 3	JPN; 4	AUS; Ret	MAL; 4	VAL; 3					6th	146
2015	Moto2	Kalex	QAT; 8	AME; 2	**ARG**; 1	SPA; 2	FRA; 3	ITA; 2	**CAT**; 1	**NED**; 1	**GER**; 2	INP; 2	**CZE**; 1	GBR; 1	**RSM**; 1	ARA; 6	**JPN**; 1	AUS; 7	MAL; 1	VAL; 7					1st	352
2016	Moto2	Kalex	QAT; 12	ARG; 1	AME; 3	SPA; 5	FRA; 24	ITA; 1	**CAT**; 1	NED; 2	GER; 1	**AUT**; 1	**CZE**; 11	GBR; 22	**RSM**; 4	ARA; 8	**JPN**; 2	AUS; 12	**MAL**; 1	**VAL**; 1					1st	276
2017	MotoGP	Yamaha	QAT; Ret	ARG; 5	AME; 5	SPA; 4	FRA; 2	ITA; 7	CAT; 5	**NED**; 14	GER; 9	CZE; 12	AUT; 5	GBR; 6	RSM; 15	ARA; 9	**JPN**; 8	AUS; 4	MAL; 3	VAL; 2					6th	174
2018	MotoGP	Yamaha	**QAT**; 8	ARG; 2	AME; 6	SPA; 2	**FRA**; Ret	ITA; 10	CAT; 7	NED; 8	GER; 9	CZE; 7	AUT; 9	GBR; C	RSM; 10	ARA; 14	THA; 5	JPN; 6	AUS; Ret	MAL; 3	VAL; 7				6th	158
2019	MotoGP	KTM	QAT; 15	ARG; 15	AME; 13	SPA; 14	FRA; 13	ITA; 17	CAT; 10	NED; Ret	GER; Ret	CZE; 14	AUT; 12	GBR; Ret	RSM; 11	ARA	THA	JPN							18th	30
2019	MotoGP	Honda																	AUS; 13	MAL; Ret	VAL; Ret				18th	30
2020	MotoGP	Ducati	SPA; 11	ANC; 9	**CZE**; 3	AUT; Ret	STY; 14	RSM; 15	EMI; 11	CAT; Ret	FRA; 5	ARA; 10	TER; 5	EUR; 9	VAL; Ret	POR; 10									13th	77
2021	MotoGP	Ducati	QAT; 2	DOH; 2	POR; Ret	SPA; 8	FRA; 2	ITA; 4	CAT; 2	**GER**; 8	NED; 4	STY; 6	AUT; Ret	GBR; 11	ARA; 17	RSM; 12	AME; Ret	EMI; 5	ALR; 5	VAL; 6					5th	173
2022	MotoGP	Ducati	QAT; 8	INA; 3	ARG; Ret	AME; 9	**POR**; 2	SPA; Ret	FRA; 5	ITA; 4	CAT; 3	GER; 2	NED; 13	**GBR**; Ret	AUT; 5	RSM; Ret	ARA; 8	JPN; 11	THA; 4	AUS; 8	MAL; 9	VAL; Ret			8th	166
2023	MotoGP	Ducati	POR; 4^{8}	ARG; 2	AME; 7	SPA; Ret^{8}	FRA; 3^{6}	ITA; 3^{4}	GER; 3^{5}	NED; Ret	GBR; 9^{4}	AUT; 13	CAT; 4^{7}	RSM; 10	IND; 6	JPN; NC^{5}	INA; Ret	AUS; 1	THA; 10^{9}	MAL; 12^{8}	QAT; 12	VAL; 2^{9}			5th	225
2024	MotoGP	Honda	QAT; 12	POR; 15	AME; Ret	SPA; Ret	FRA; 12	CAT; 16	ITA; 19	NED; 13	GER; 17	GBR; 14	AUT; 21	ARA; 13	RSM; 12	EMI; 15	INA; 9^{8}	JPN; 11	AUS; 12	THA; 8	MAL; 11	SLD; 14			17th	55
2025	MotoGP	Honda	THA; 7	ARG; 6^{4}	AME; 17	QAT; 4	SPA; 11	FRA; 1^{6}	GBR; 2^{5}	ARA; Ret	ITA; Ret	NED; 12	GER; Ret^{7}	CZE; 13^{8}	AUT; 12^{8}	HUN; Ret	CAT; Ret^{7}	RSM; 16	JPN; 9	INA; 12	AUS; Ret	MAL; 12^{8}	POR; 9^{7}	VAL; 12	12th	148
2026	MotoGP	Honda	THA; 11	BRA; 9	USA; Ret^{9}	SPA; 7^{8}	FRA; 11	CAT; Ret^{5}	ITA	HUN	CZE	NED	GER	GBR	ARA; 15^{9}	RSM; Ret	AUT; 10^{7}	JPN; 20^{7}	INA; 13	AUS; C	MAL	QAT	POR	VAL	17th*	51*

=== Suzuka 8 Hours ===
Year	Team	Riders	Bike	Pos
2024	(Japan) Team HRC	(Japan) Takumi Takahashi (Japan) Teppei Nagoe	Honda CBR1000RR-R SP	1st
2025	(Japan) Team HRC	(Japan) Takumi Takahashi	Honda CBR1000RR-R SP	1st

== Records ==
As of 9 April 2025, Johann Zarco holds the following records:

Moto2

- Most Moto2 riders' championships: 2 (2015, 2016)
- Most podiums in a season: 14 (2015, shared with Marc Márquez, Esteve Rabat and Pedro Acosta)
- Most consecutive podiums: 12
- Most points scored in a single season: 352 (2015)
- Biggest title-winning margin by points: 118 (2015)

Sporting positions
Preceded by Inaugural champion	Red Bull MotoGP Rookies Cup champion 2007	Succeeded by J. D. Beach
