= Hafizh Syahrin =

Malaysian motorcycle racer

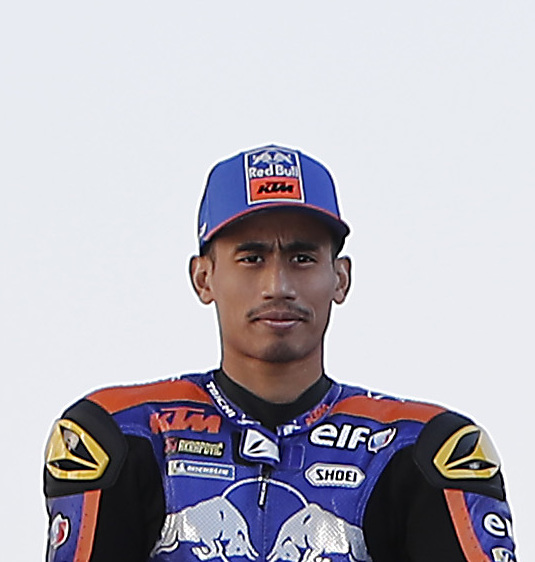
- Hafizh in 2019
- Nationality: Malaysian
- Born: 5 May 1994 (age 32); Ampang, Selangor, Malaysia
- Current team: JDT Racing Team
- Bike number: 55
Motorcycle racing career statistics
MotoGP World Championship
| Active years | 2018–2019 |
| Manufacturers | Yamaha (2018); KTM (2019) |
| Championships | 0 |
| 2019 championship position | 23rd (9 pts) |
Starts / Wins / Podiums / Poles / F. laps / Points; 37 / 0 / 0 / 0 / 0 / 55
Moto2 World Championship
| Active years | 2011–2017, 2020–2021 |
| Manufacturers | Moriwaki, FTR, Kalex, Speed Up, NTS |
| Championships | 0 |
| 2021 championship position | 28th (9 pts) |
Starts / Wins / Podiums / Poles / F. laps / Points; 109 / 0 / 3 / 0 / 1 / 377
Superbike World Championship
| Active years | 2022–2024 |
| Manufacturers | Honda, Ducati |
| Championships | 0 |
| 2024 championship position | 36th (0 pts) |
Starts / Wins / Podiums / Poles / F. laps / Points; 63 / 0 / 0 / 0 / 0 / 21

Hafizh Syahrin bin Abdullah (born 5 May 1994) is a Malaysian motorcycle racer, who most recently competed in WorldSBK in 2024 on a Ducati in JDT Racing Team colors. He raced full time in the series in 2022 and 2023 with MIE Honda. In 2018, he most notably became the first ever Southeast Asian to race in the MotoGP category.

== Career ==
=== Early career ===
Hafizh was born on 5 May 1994 in Selangor, Malaysia, and grew up in Selangor. He began his career at the age of nine, in pocket bikes, where he eventually acquired the nickname "King of Pocket Bikes". It was not long before his talent began to show, after his racing debut on pocket bikes the following year. Dominating the pocket bike category soon after, he was discovered by Leong at one of the pocket bike tracks, purely by chance.

In 2007, at the age of 13, Hafizh made his debut in the Cub Prix championship in dominating style, finishing his first year on the Yamaha LC135 Cup class second overall.

Hafizh's form continued the following year, as Petronas Sprinta Raceline team's youngest rider, taking third overall in the Yamaha Givi Cup in 2008, and in the process also making waves through his entries in the Novice category, with similarly impressive results.

Hafizh started the 2009 season on a high, winning the opening race of the season at Alor Setar with a win in the Novice category. With seven wins out of eight rounds, and the other also being a podium finish, his dominance in the category was so unrivalled that he opted to forego the final two rounds. The youngster switched to race against his more illustrious and seasoned seniors in the Expert category, finishing with podium results. He also finished third in the Asia Road Racing Underbone 115cc Championship.

Graduating to take on the expert category in 2010, the switch was seamless as Hafizh literally broke down all the barriers, and tore the competition apart. Despite a massive revamp in the technical regulations that led to the renaming of the expert category to become the CP130 category, these changes did little to rattle Hafizh's cage.

By the time the season drew to a close in Penang's Padang Kota Lama, Hafizh had finished off the competition, to emerge as the championship's youngest ever CP130 champion, erasing the record set by Norizman Ismail who was the Expert champion in 2005 at the age of 20.

2010 was also significant as Hafizh made the step up to the bigger league, the Petronas Asia Road Racing Championship aboard a 600cc SuperSport bike. Against a much older and experienced field, the youngster held his own to finish his debut season in a respectable 12th from 39 riders. He finished fourth in the same series in 2011. He moved into the Spanish Moto2 series in 2012, finishing sixth there.

=== Moto2 World Championship ===
In 2012, wild-card Hafizh led during the middle stages of his home Malaysian Grand Prix, on his way to a fourth place. The result was later promoted to a third-place finish, after Anthony West's results were annulled in November 2013, due to doping.

In the 2013 Moto2 World Championship, Hafizh made four more wildcard appearances, scoring a point at his home race in Malaysia.

==== Petronas Raceline Malaysia (2014–2017) ====
Hafizh moved into Moto2 full-time in 2014, riding the lone Kalex for the Petronas Raceline Malaysia team. He finished the season in 19th position, with 42 points, and a season's best seventh place finish in the United States Grand Prix.

For the 2015 Moto2 World Championship, Hafizh made further improvements by collecting 64 points, with a season best finish of fifth at the Japanese Grand Prix, and ending the year 16th in the championship standings.

In 2016, Hafizh surprised many people by finishing fourth at three Grands Prixs (Qatar, Catalunya and Britain) and finishing ten Grands Prixs in the top-ten. He collected 118 points total, and finished the championship in ninth position.

In 2017, Hafizh made a slow start to the year, but started making an impact in the second half of the season, when he scored his second podium in the category, with another third place in the San Marino Grand Prix, which was later turned into a second place after Dominique Aegerter was disqualified. Later, he had another strong result by taking the third podium of his Moto2 career, when he get third position in a wet race at the Japanese Grand Prix, making it two podiums within three races. He ended that season tenth overall, with 106 points.

=== MotoGP World Championship ===
==== Monster Yamaha Tech 3 (2018) ====
Just a week before the 2018 MotoGP Sepang pre-season test, Jonas Folger made a surprise announcement that he would not compete in the 2018 season, in order to recover from his Gilbert's syndrome health problems. The head of the Monster Yamaha Tech3 team, Hervé Poncharal, had a discussion with SIC Petronas CEO Razlan Razali, and their main sponsor Yamaha Asia, about the possibility of replacing Folger with Hafizh. He was given the opportunity to take part in the early pre-season test at the Circuit of Buriram, a track Hafizh knew well. Hafizh, nicknamed "El Pescao", made an impressive performance on his 1st ever run on a MotoGP bike, by clocking a lap time as good as the other rookies, though this may have been boosted by the unavailability of other riders on the grid who had contracts with other teams, leading to test riders like Yonny Hernandez getting an opportunity. Nevertheless, Monster Yamaha Tech3 was delighted with his potential, and signed Hafizh to fill Jonas Folger's seat for the 2018 season.

Hafizh did well in his first MotoGP season, when he fought for Rookie of the Year before losing out to Franco Morbidelli by only four points. His best result of the season came in the second round at Argentina, when he finished ninth after starting from 23rd. Hafizh ended the year 16th in the standings, with 46 points. On 6 June 2018, Tech3 announced that they would retain Hafizh for 2019, in a new era for Hervé Poncharal's team, that would see him make the switch to a factory spec KTM machine.

==== Red Bull KTM Tech 3 (2019) ====
Hafizh would again ride for Tech3, this time riding a KTM alongside new rookie teammate Miguel Oliveira. He only finished six races in the points, scoring nine points total. The team announced they would not renew his contract, and would replace him with Brad Binder for the 2020 season, but Binder later moved up to the Factory KTM Team for 2020, following Johann Zarco taking the decision to leave the team after only one year of his two year deal. This led to Hafizh being instead replaced by Iker Lecuona.

=== Return to Moto2 ===
==== Aspar Team (2020) ====
After losing his spot in MotoGP, Hafizh returned to Moto2 with the Aspar Team for the 2020 Moto2 World Championship. He started the season well, scoring a sixth place in the second round at Jerez, but only finished in the point scoring places three times after that race, scoring a total of 21 points.

==== NTS RW Racing GP (2021) ====
Hafizh switched teams for the 2021 season, but struggled again, scoring points in only three races, nine total points in the season. He switched to WorldSBK in 2022.

=== Superbike World Championship ===
==== MIE Racing Honda Team (2022) ====
Hafizh struggled with the Honda machinery, but made a decent start ahead of his Superbike World Championship debut.

== Career statistics ==
=== FIM CEV Moto2 European Championship ===
==== Races by year ====
(key) (Races in bold indicate pole position, races in italics indicate fastest lap)

| Year | Bike | 1 | 2 | 3 | 4 | 5 | 6 | 7 | 8 | 9 | 10 | 11 | Pos | Pts |
|---|---|---|---|---|---|---|---|---|---|---|---|---|---|---|
| 2017 | Kalex | **ALB**; 1 | CAT1 | CAT2 | VAL1 | VAL2 | EST1 | EST2 | JER | ARA1 | ARA2 | VAL | 15th | 25 |

=== Grand Prix motorcycle racing ===
==== By season ====
| Season | Class | Motorcycle | Team | Number | Race | Win | Podium | Pole | FLap | Pts | Plcd |
|---|---|---|---|---|---|---|---|---|---|---|---|
| 2011 | Moto2 | Moriwaki | Petronas Malaysia | 86 | 1 | 0 | 0 | 0 | 0 | 0 | NC |
| 2012 | Moto2 | FTR | Petronas Raceline Malaysia | 86 | 1 | 0 | 1 | 0 | 1 | 16 | 23rd |
| 2013 | Moto2 | Kalex | Petronas Raceline Malaysia | 55 | 4 | 0 | 0 | 0 | 0 | 1 | 29th |
| 2014 | Moto2 | Kalex | Petronas Raceline Malaysia | 55 | 18 | 0 | 0 | 0 | 0 | 42 | 19th |
| 2015 | Moto2 | Kalex | Petronas Raceline Malaysia | 55 | 18 | 0 | 0 | 0 | 0 | 64 | 16th |
| 2016 | Moto2 | Kalex | Petronas Raceline Malaysia | 55 | 18 | 0 | 0 | 0 | 0 | 118 | 9th |
| 2017 | Moto2 | Kalex | Petronas Raceline Malaysia | 55 | 18 | 0 | 2 | 0 | 0 | 106 | 10th |
| 2018 | MotoGP | Yamaha | Monster Yamaha Tech 3 | 55 | 18 | 0 | 0 | 0 | 0 | 46 | 16th |
| 2019 | MotoGP | KTM | Red Bull KTM Tech 3 | 55 | 19 | 0 | 0 | 0 | 0 | 9 | 23rd |
| 2020 | Moto2 | Speed Up | Aspar Team | 55 | 14 | 0 | 0 | 0 | 0 | 21 | 21st |
| 2021 | Moto2 | NTS | NTS RW Racing GP | 55 | 17 | 0 | 0 | 0 | 0 | 9 | 28th |
| Total | | | | | **146** | **0** | **3** | **0** | **1** | **432** | |

==== By class ====
| Class | Seasons | 1st GP | 1st Pod | 1st Win | Race | Win | Podiums | Pole | FLap | Pts |
|---|---|---|---|---|---|---|---|---|---|---|
| Moto2 | 2011–2017, 2020–2021 | 2011 Malaysia | 2012 Malaysia | | 109 | 0 | 3 | 0 | 1 | 377 |
| MotoGP | 2018–2019 | 2018 Qatar | | | 37 | 0 | 0 | 0 | 0 | 55 |
| Total | 2011–2021 | | | | **146** | **0** | **3** | **0** | **1** | **432** |

==== Races by year ====
(key) (Races in bold indicate pole position, races in italics indicate fastest lap)

| Year | Class | Bike | 1 | 2 | 3 | 4 | 5 | 6 | 7 | 8 | 9 | 10 | 11 | 12 | 13 | 14 | 15 | 16 | 17 | 18 | 19 | Pos | Pts |
|---|---|---|---|---|---|---|---|---|---|---|---|---|---|---|---|---|---|---|---|---|---|---|---|
| 2011 | Moto2 | Moriwaki | QAT | SPA | POR | FRA | CAT | GBR | NED | ITA | GER | CZE | INP | RSM | ARA | JPN | AUS | MAL; 20 | VAL | | | NC | 0 |
| 2012 | Moto2 | FTR | QAT | SPA | POR | FRA | CAT | GBR | NED | GER | ITA | INP | CZE | RSM | ARA | JPN | MAL; 3 | AUS | VAL | | | 23rd | 16 |
| 2013 | Moto2 | Kalex | QAT | AME | SPA | FRA; 21 | ITA | CAT; 18 | NED | GER | INP | CZE | GBR | RSM | ARA | MAL; 15 | AUS | JPN | VAL; Ret | | | 29th | 1 |
| 2014 | Moto2 | Kalex | QAT; 15 | AME; 15 | ARG; 20 | SPA; 21 | FRA; 15 | ITA; 25 | CAT; Ret | NED; 10 | GER; 18 | INP; 7 | CZE; 13 | GBR; 8 | RSM; 20 | ARA; 11 | JPN; 8 | AUS; Ret | MAL; Ret | VAL; 16 | | 19th | 42 |
| 2015 | Moto2 | Kalex | QAT; 12 | AME; 6 | ARG; 10 | SPA; 12 | FRA; 9 | ITA; Ret | CAT; 14 | NED; 15 | GER; 16 | INP; Ret | CZE; 14 | GBR; 16 | RSM; 18 | ARA; 7 | JPN; 5 | AUS; 16 | MAL; 8 | VAL; Ret | | 16th | 64 |
| 2016 | Moto2 | Kalex | QAT; 4 | ARG; 6 | AME; 16 | SPA; 11 | FRA; 8 | ITA; 5 | CAT; 4 | NED; Ret | GER; 7 | AUT; 21 | CZE; 6 | GBR; 4 | RSM; 7 | ARA; 14 | JPN; 13 | AUS; Ret | MAL; 5 | VAL; 15 | | 9th | 118 |
| 2017 | Moto2 | Kalex | QAT; Ret | ARG; 10 | AME; 11 | SPA; 13 | FRA; 11 | ITA; 12 | CAT; 9 | NED; 8 | GER; 11 | CZE; 15 | AUT; 10 | GBR; 17 | RSM; 2 | ARA; 16 | JPN; 3 | AUS; 16 | MAL; 6 | VAL; 6 | | 10th | 106 |
| 2018 | MotoGP | Yamaha | QAT; 14 | ARG; 9 | AME; Ret | SPA; 16 | FRA; 12 | ITA; 12 | CAT; Ret | NED; 18 | GER; 11 | CZE; 14 | AUT; 16 | GBR; C | RSM; 19 | ARA; 18 | THA; 12 | JPN; 10 | AUS; Ret | MAL; 10 | VAL; 10 | 16th | 46 |
| 2019 | MotoGP | KTM | QAT; 20 | ARG; 16 | AME; 18 | SPA; 19 | FRA; 14 | ITA; Ret | CAT; Ret | NED; 15 | GER; 16 | CZE; Ret | AUT; Ret | GBR; 13 | RSM; 15 | ARA; 21 | THA; 20 | JPN; 19 | AUS; 15 | MAL; 16 | VAL; 15 | 23rd | 9 |
| 2020 | Moto2 | Speed Up | QAT; 19 | SPA; 6 | ANC; Ret | CZE; 9 | AUT; Ret | STY | RSM; Ret | EMI; 19 | CAT; 18 | FRA; 15 | ARA; 19 | TER; 13 | EUR; Ret | VAL; 19 | POR; 21 | | | | | 21st | 21 |
| 2021 | Moto2 | NTS | QAT; Ret | DOH; 21 | POR; 18 | SPA; 17 | FRA; 15 | ITA; 9 | CAT; 20 | GER; 17 | NED; 23 | STY; Ret | AUT; 18 | GBR; 21 | ARA; 19 | RSM; 18 | AME; 20 | EMI | ALR; 18 | VAL; 15 | | 28th | 9 |

=== Superbike World Championship ===
==== By season ====
| Season | Class | Motorcycle | Team | Number | Race | Win | Podium | Pole | FLap | Pts | Plcd |
|---|---|---|---|---|---|---|---|---|---|---|---|
| 2022 | SBK | Honda | MIE Racing Honda Team | 35 | 30 | 0 | 0 | 0 | 0 | 10 | 23rd |
| 2023 | SBK | Honda | Petronas MIE Racing Honda Team | 35 | 30 | 0 | 0 | 0 | 0 | 11 | 21st |
| 2024 | SBK | Ducati | JDT Racing Team | 10 | 3 | 0 | 0 | 0 | 0 | 0 | 36th |
| Total | | | | | **63** | **0** | **0** | **0** | **0** | **21** | |

==== Races by year ====
(key) (Races in bold indicate pole position) (Races in italics indicate fastest lap)

| Year | Bike | 1 | | | 2 | | | 3 | | | 4 | | | 5 | | | 6 | | | 7 | | | 8 | | | 9 | | | 10 | | | 11 | | | 12 | | | Pos | Pts |
| Year | Bike | R1 | SR | R2 | R1 | SR | R2 | R1 | SR | R2 | R1 | SR | R2 | R1 | SR | R2 | R1 | SR | R2 | R1 | SR | R2 | R1 | SR | R2 | R1 | SR | R2 | R1 | SR | R2 | R1 | SR | R2 | R1 | SR | R2 | Pos | Pts |
|---|---|---|---|---|---|---|---|---|---|---|---|---|---|---|---|---|---|---|---|---|---|---|---|---|---|---|---|---|---|---|---|---|---|---|---|---|---|---|---|
| 2022 | Honda | SPA; 21 | SPA; 22 | SPA; 20 | NED; 20 | NED; 22 | NED; 17 | POR; 19 | POR; 16 | POR; 19 | ITA; 17 | ITA; 13 | ITA; Ret | GBR; 17 | GBR; 19 | GBR; 20 | CZE; Ret | CZE; 15 | CZE; 12 | FRA; 20 | FRA; 17 | FRA; 19 | SPA; WD | SPA; WD | SPA; WD | POR; Ret | POR; 23 | POR; 19 | ARG | ARG | ARG | INA; 13 | INA; 15 | INA; 14 | AUS; 15 | AUS; 12 | AUS; 17 | 23rd | 10 |
| 2023 | Honda | AUS; 15 | AUS; 19 | AUS; 17 | INA; 16 | INA; 17 | INA; 15 | NED; 19 | NED; 18 | NED; 14 | SPA; 14 | SPA; 16 | SPA; Ret | EMI; Ret | EMI; 15 | EMI; 15 | GBR; 17 | GBR; 19 | GBR; 15 | ITA | ITA | ITA | CZE | CZE | CZE | FRA; 18 | FRA; 18 | FRA; 14 | SPA; 19 | SPA; 19 | SPA; Ret | POR; 20 | POR; 19 | POR; Ret | SPA; 15 | SPA; 16 | SPA; 19 | 21st | 11 |
| 2024 | Ducati | AUS | AUS | AUS | SPA | SPA | SPA | NED | NED | NED | ITA | ITA | ITA | GBR | GBR | GBR | CZE | CZE | CZE | POR; 18 | POR; 20 | POR; 22 | FRA | FRA | FRA | ITA | ITA | ITA | SPA | SPA | SPA | POR | POR | POR | SPA | SPA | SPA | 36th | 0 |

=== Asia Road Racing Championship ===
==== Races by year ====
(key) (Races in bold indicate pole position, races in italics indicate fastest lap)

| Year | Bike | 1 | | 2 | | 3 | | 4 | | 5 | | 6 | | Pos | Pts |
| Year | Bike | R1 | R2 | R1 | R2 | R1 | R2 | R1 | R2 | R1 | R2 | R1 | R2 | Pos | Pts |
|---|---|---|---|---|---|---|---|---|---|---|---|---|---|---|---|
| 2024 | Ducati | CHA; Ret | CHA; 2 | **ZHU**; 1 | **ZHU**; C | MOT; 3 | MOT; 2 | MAN; 7 | MAN; 2 | **SEP**; 5 | **SEP**; 3 | CHA; 5 | CHA; 10 | 3rd | 154 |
| 2025 | Ducati | CHA; 3 | CHA; 5 | SEP; 2 | SEP; 2 | **MOT**; Ret | **MOT**; 1 | **MAN**; 1 | **MAN**; Ret | **SEP**; 1 | **SEP**; 10 | CHA; 1 | CHA; 2 | 1st | 193 |
| 2026 | Ducati | **SEP**; 1 | **SEP**; 1 | **CHA**; 1 | **CHA**; 1 | **MOT**; 1 | **MOT**; 1 | **MAN**; 1 | **MAN**; 1 | SEP; 1 | SEP; 2 | CHA | CHA | 1st* | 245* |

==== Suzuka 8 Hours results ====
| Year | Team | Riders | Bike | Pos |
|---|---|---|---|---|
| 2024 | (Italy) Ducati Team KAGAYAMA | (Japan) Ryo Mizuno (Australia) Josh Waters | Ducati Panigale V4R | **4th** |
