= Tommy Aquino =

American motorcycle racer

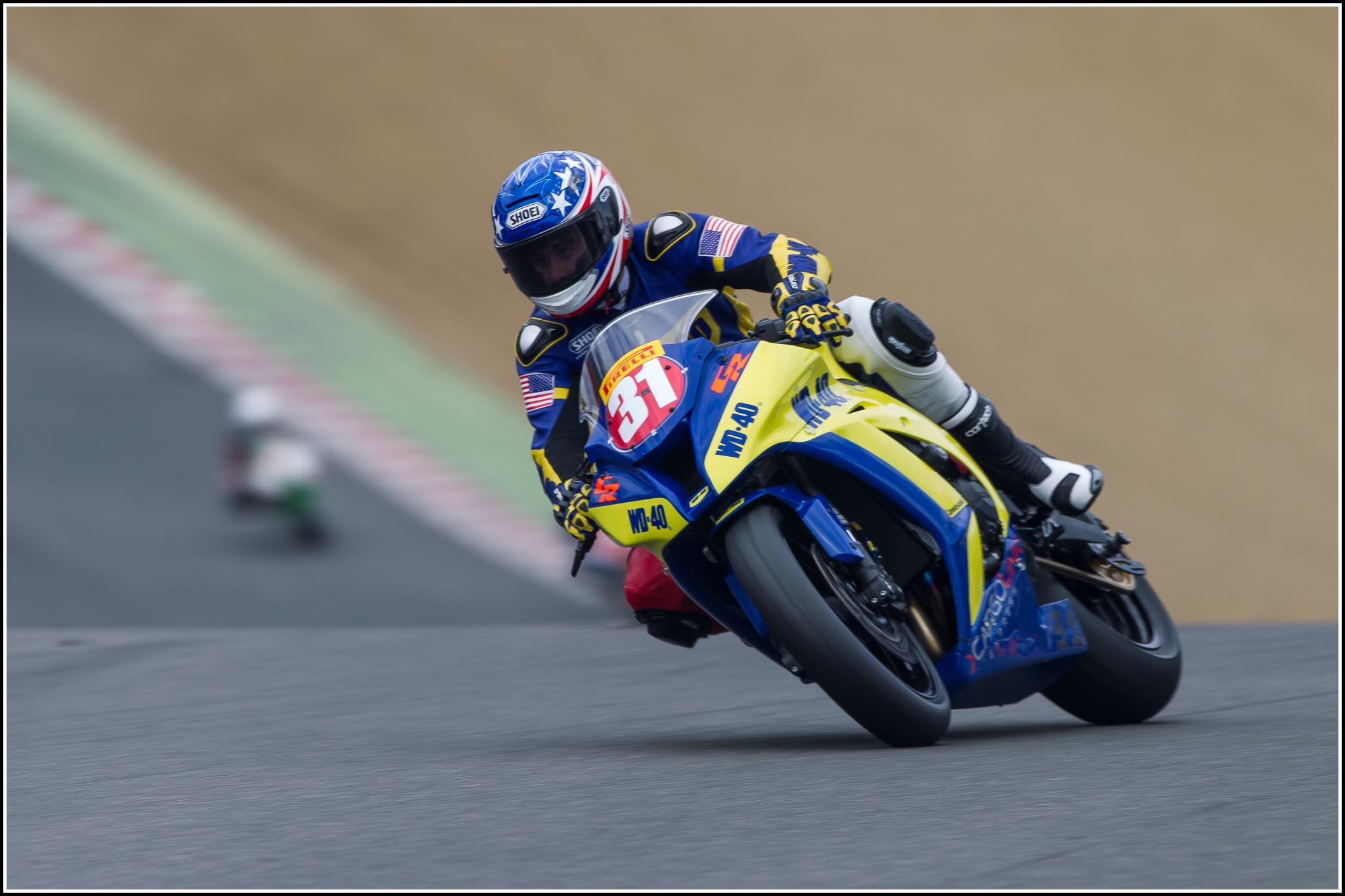
- Brands Hatch British Superbikes meeting 2013
- Nationality: American
- Born: May 24, 1992; Woodland Hills, Los Angeles
- Died: February 2, 2014 (aged 21); Piru, California
- Bike number: 24, 6, 31
- Website: tommyaquino.com

Tommy Aquino (May 24, 1992 – February 2, 2014) was an American motorcycle racer who competed in the AMA Pro Daytona Sportbike Championship. His best result in the class was in 2011 when he finished third in the championship, with one win.

Aquino later rode in the British Superstock Championship becoming known as Hollywood Aquino with a contract to ride for Brent Gladwin's GR Motorsport team in British Superbikes for 2014.

Aquino died following a training accident while riding motocross in what was described as a head-on accident with another rider who was out of control.
