= Moriwaki Engineering =

Japanese manufacturer

Moriwaki Engineering Co., Ltd.
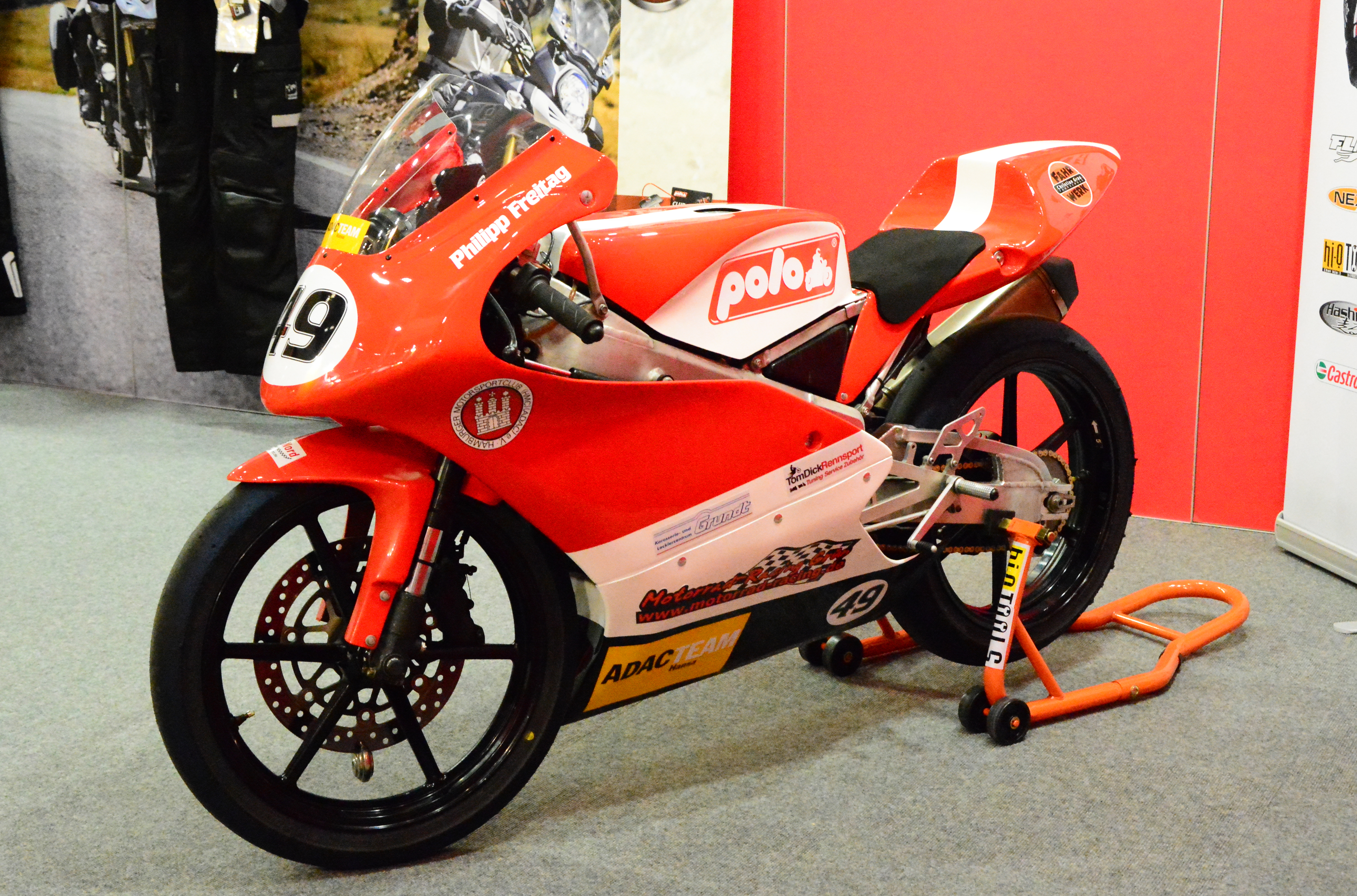
- Moriwaki MD250H
- Type: Private
- Industry: Transportation
- Founded: September 30, 1973
- Headquarters: Suzuka, Mie Prefecture, Japan
- Area served: 10+ countries and regions including North America, Europe and Australia
- Key people: Mamoru Moriwaki, Founder and Representative Director; Namiko Moriwaki, Senior Managing Director; Midori Moriwaki, Managing Director
- Products: Motorbikes
- Revenue: 10,000,000 JPY
- Website: Moriwaki Engineering

Moriwaki Engineering is a Japanese manufacturer of speciality high performance products and motorcycle accessories.

== Company founder ==
Mamoru Moriwaki is a Japanese motorcycle tuner, race team owner and founder of Moriwaki Engineering, a Japanese specialty engineering company that designs, manufactures and sells high performance parts for motorcycles and cars.

His motorcycle industry career is closely intertwined with that of Pops Yoshimura, another respected motorcycle tuner.

Moriwaki began his career as a motorcycle racer for Hideo "Pops" Yoshimura, a respected motorcycle mechanic and tuner involved in Japanese motorcycle racing. Moriwaki received no formal training in engineering while working for Yoshimura. Instead, he became self-taught, learning about mechanical engineering from books borrowed from his local high school. Moriwaki married Namiko Yoshimura, Pops’ eldest daughter, while he was working for the company. While working for the Yoshimura racing team, Moriwaki also successfully competed in auto racing, driving a Yoshimura-prepared Honda S800 sports car to a class victory at the 6 Hours of Fuji endurance race on July 26, 1970, and the GTS1 Class at the 1971 Japan Grand Prix.

In 1971, Yoshimura made the decision to move his company to the United States to take advantage of the burgeoning American motorcycle market. Moriwaki did not agree with Yoshimura and refused to leave his home in Japan. This created a rift between the two men; however, within a year Yoshimura had returned to Japan and sought Moriwaki for help after he had been cheated out of all his money in a business transaction in America. Moriwaki loaned Yoshimura money to re-establish himself. Yoshimura would go on to establish one of the premier manufacturers of motorcycle high performance parts in the United States and became closely associated with the Suzuki racing program.

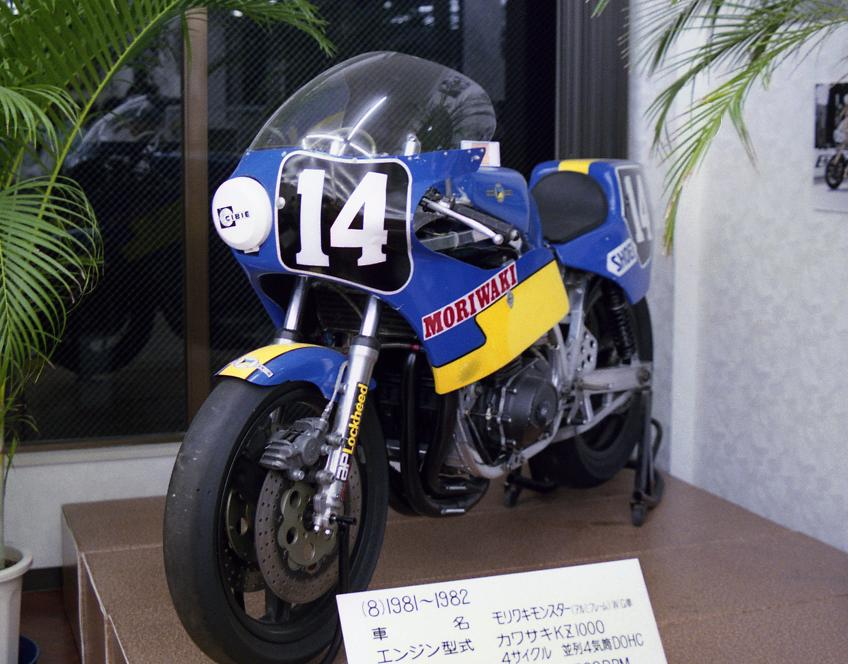
Moriwaki Kawasaki ridden by Wayne Gardner in the 1981 Suzuka 8 Hours endurance race

Moriwaki remained in Japan and in 1973 he founded Moriwaki Engineering in Suzuka City, Japan. He became known for modifying engines and constructing frames for the Kawasaki Z1. His bikes were successfully raced in the Australian Superbike Championship in the late 1970s by New Zealander Graeme Crosby. Crosby and co-rider Tony Hatton finished in third place at the prestigious Suzuka 8 Hours endurance race in 1978. Moriwaki's reputation continued to be enhanced when Crosby and Akitaka Tomie qualified a Moriwaki Kawasaki on pole position at the 1979 Suzuka 8 Hours, ahead of all the major factory racing teams. At the 1980 Suzuka 8 Hours race, the Moriwaki team of Dave Aldana and David Emde qualified in a respectable second place ahead of the official Kawasaki factory-backed team of Eddie Lawson and Gregg Hansford.

After Crosby went on to race in the world championships, Moriwaki hired Australian rider Wayne Gardner in 1981. Also in 1981, Moriwaki developed the world's first aluminum frame for large capacity motorcycles and entered them in competitions. Gardner and John Pace qualified their Moriwaki Kawasaki on pole position at the 1981 Suzuka 8 Hours, once again beating all the major factory racing teams. Gardner then rode the Moriwaki Kawasaki to an impressive fourth-place finish at the 1981 Daytona Superbike race behind Yoshimura Suzuki riders Crosby, Wes Cooley and Honda's Freddie Spencer. Moriwaki and Gardner proceeded to compete in the British Championship, winning their first race in England. Gardner entered the final race of the season with a chance to win the title but, an engine misfire relegated him to third place overall in the championship. Gardner's impressive results on the Moriwaki Kawasaki eventually earned him a contract with the Honda factory racing team and an eventual world championship in 1987.

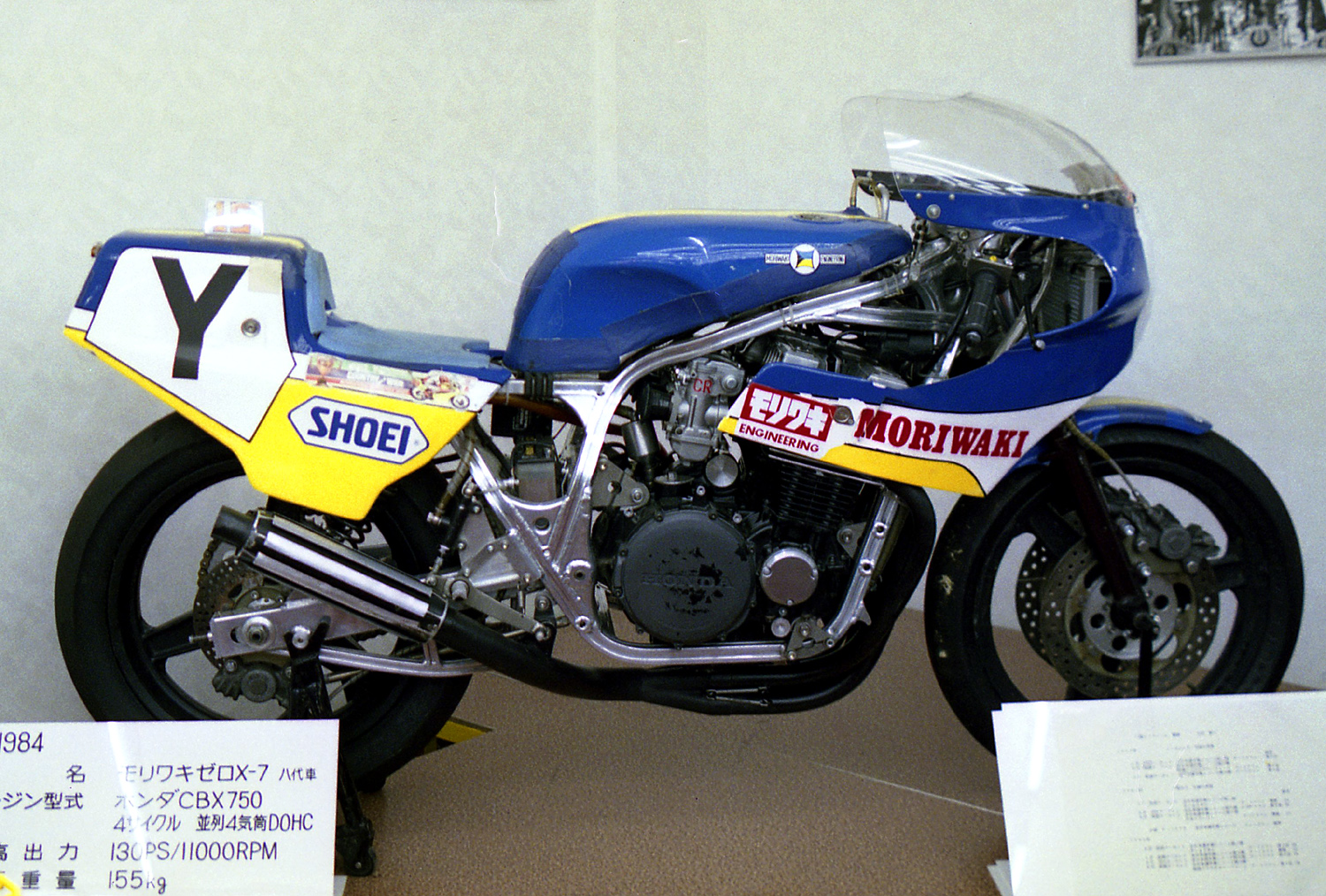
1984 Moriwaki Honda Zero X-7

In the 1980s, Moriwaki became closely associated with Honda Racing Corporation, the racing division for the Honda parent company. Moriwaki was the first outside firm allowed to use one of Honda's racing engines. From 2003 to 2005, Moriwaki competed in the premier MotoGP class with a Honda RC211V engine in a Moriwaki designed frame. The firm gained valuable knowledge from this experience and in 2010, a Moriwaki-framed machine run by Gresini Racing took the inaugural Moto2 title with rider Toni Elias. On the MD600, Elias won 7 races with the bike and secured the championship with a fourth place at the Malaysian Grand Prix, held at Sepang.

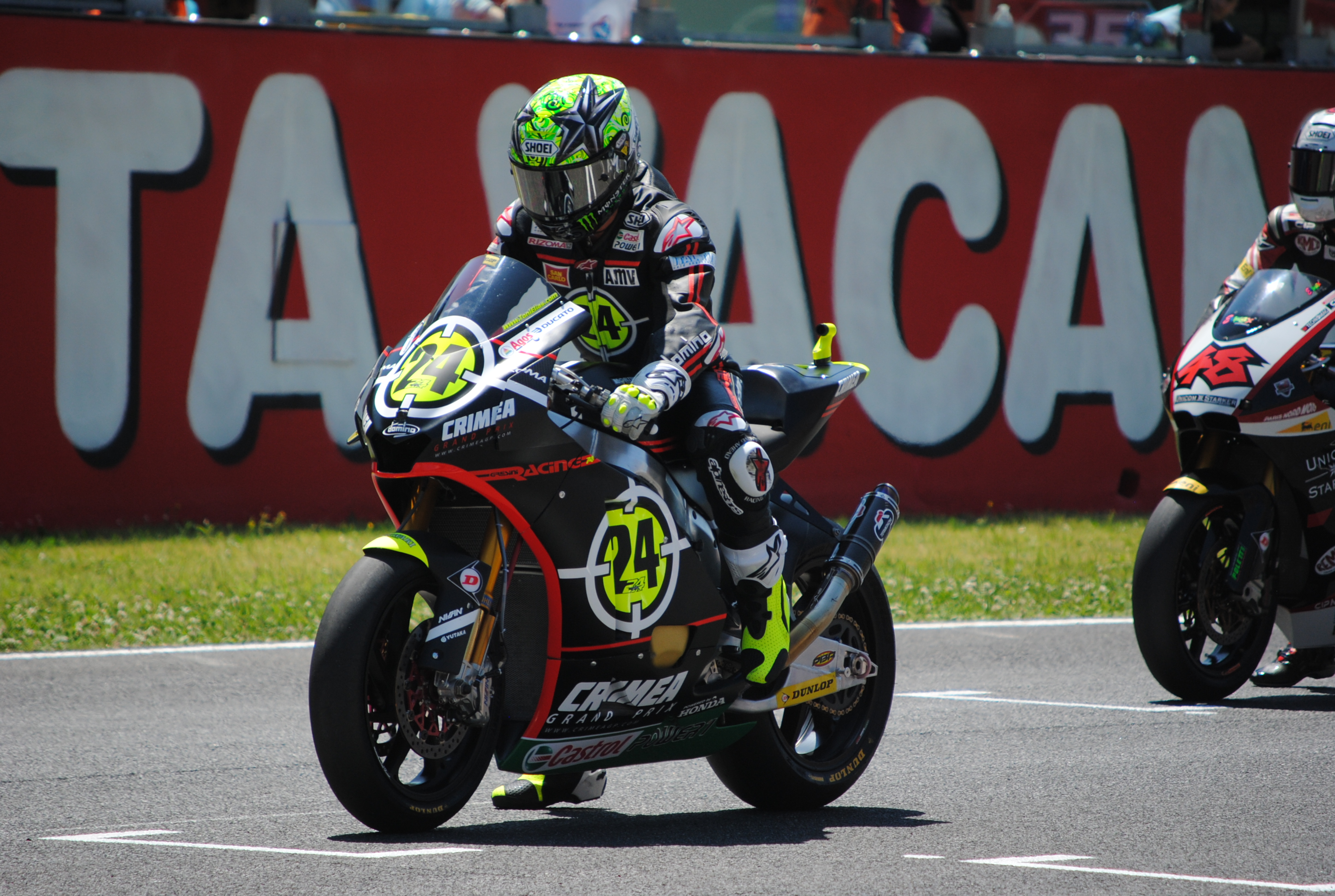
Toni Elías on the Moriwaki MD600

The Moto2 formula is based on a universal engine and engine-ancillary equipment specification, with identical controlled engines supplied to teams via the organisers, previously based on the Honda CBR600RR superseded by the Triumph Street Triple RS 765 from the 2019 season. Fuel, oil brakes and tyres are also controlled. Teams are able to use any supplier of chassis, suspension and bodywork under strict regulations to enable no one team to dominate by technology or expenditure.

== Midori Moriwaki and World Superbikes ==
In late 2018 at EICMA, it was announced that Moriwaki would join with Honda Racing Corporation to run the Honda Fireblade in World Superbikes during 2019 with riders Leon Camier and Ryuichi Kiyonari. Initially using Japanese Superbike race series specification as a base-setting, the team collaborated with Europe-based Althea Racing. Previously Honda's alliance was with Ten Kate Racing, but due to poor results Honda decided on full-factory backing with long-term partner in Japan motorsport Moriwaki Racing. Previously Midori Moriwaki was Team Manager for KYB Moriwaki Motul Racing in Endurance events.

=== WSBK Results ===
(key) (Races in bold indicate pole position; races in italics indicate fastest lap)

Year	Team	Bike	Tyres	No.	Riders	1			2			3			4			5			6			7			8			9			10			11			12			13			RC	Points	TC	Points	MC	Points
Year	Team	Bike	Tyres	No.	Riders	R1	SR	R2	R1	SR	R2	R1	SR	R2	R1	SR	R2	R1	SR	R2	R1	SR	R2	R1	SR	R2	R1	SR	R2	R1	SR	R2	R1	SR	R2	R1	SR	R2	R1	SR	R2	R1	SR	R2	RC	Points	TC	Points	MC	Points
2021	MIE Racing Honda Team	Honda CBR1000RR-R	P			SPA	SPA	SPA	POR	POR	POR	ITA	ITA	ITA	GBR	GBR	GBR	NED	NED	NED	CZE	CZE	CZE	SPA	SPA	SPA	FRA	FRA	FRA	SPA	SPA	SPA	SPA	SPA	SPA	POR	POR	POR	ARG	ARG	ARG	INA	INA	INA						
2021	MIE Racing Honda Team	Honda CBR1000RR-R	P	36	(Argentina) Leandro Mercado	Ret	18	18										12	14	13				Ret	18	15	Ret	19	17	15	10	14	Ret	C	15	8	11	11	16	16	15	9	C	Ret	21st	33	13th	33	5th	250
2021	MIE Racing Honda Team	Honda CBR1000RR-R	P	52	(Italy) Alessandro Delbianco																Ret	Ret	Ret																						NC	0	13th	33	5th	250
2022	MIE Racing Honda Team	Honda CBR1000RR-R	P			SPA	SPA	SPA	NED	NED	NED	POR	POR	POR	ITA	ITA	ITA	GBR	GBR	GBR	CZE	CZE	CZE	FRA	FRA	FRA	SPA	SPA	SPA	POR	POR	POR	ARG	ARG	ARG	INA	INA	INA	AUS	AUS	AUS									
2022	MIE Racing Honda Team	Honda CBR1000RR-R	P	27	(Chile) Maximilian Scheib																												20	21	21										NC	0	13th	13	5th	258
2022	MIE Racing Honda Team	Honda CBR1000RR-R	P	35	(Malaysia) Hafizh Syahrin	21	22	20	20	22	17	19	16	19	17	13	Ret	17	19	20	Ret	15	12	20	17	19	WD	WD	WD	Ret	23	19				13	15	14	15	12	17				23rd	10	13th	13	5th	258
2022	MIE Racing Honda Team	Honda CBR1000RR-R	P	36	(Argentina) Leandro Mercado	20	20	21	19	18	15	Ret	14	18	19	19	18	Ret	20	17	17	17	15	21	20	Ret	18	19	27	23	21	20	Ret	17	19	Ret	16	17	17	14	15				29th	3	13th	13	5th	258
2023	Petronas MIE Racing Honda Team	Honda CBR1000RR-R	P			AUS	AUS	AUS	INA	INA	INA	NED	NED	NED	SPA	SPA	SPA	EMI	EMI	EMI	GBR	GBR	GBR	ITA	ITA	ITA	CZE	CZE	CZE	FRA	FRA	FRA	SPA	SPA	SPA	POR	POR	POR	SPA	SPA	SPA									
2023	Petronas MIE Racing Honda Team	Honda CBR1000RR-R	P	35	(Malaysia) Hafizh Syahrin	15	19	17	16	17	15	19	18	14	14	16	Ret	Ret	15	15	17	19	15							18	18	14	19	19	Ret	20	19	Ret	15	16	19				21st	11	13th	12	5th	205
2023	Petronas MIE Racing Honda Team	Honda CBR1000RR-R	P	20	(Italy) Roberto Tamburini																			18	21	18																			NC	0	13th	12	5th	205
2023	Petronas MIE Racing Honda Team	Honda CBR1000RR-R	P	36	(Argentina) Leandro Mercado																																		17	20	21				NC	0	13th	12	5th	205
2023	Petronas MIE Racing Honda Team	Honda CBR1000RR-R	P	38	(Estonia) Hannes Soomer																						Ret	19	19	21	17	15													25th	1	13th	12	5th	205
2023	Petronas MIE Racing Honda Team	Honda CBR1000RR-R	P	51	(Brazil) Eric Granado	16	18	19	DNS	19	DNS	21	21	17	Ret	DNS	DNS				19	24	18	Ret	24	19	Ret	17	Ret				Ret	Ret	19	21	DNS	DNS							NC	0	13th	12	5th	205
2023	Petronas MIE Racing Honda Team	Honda CBR1000RR-R	P	88	(Japan) Ryo Mizuno													21	19	Ret																									NC	0	13th	12	5th	205
2024	Petronas MIE Racing Honda Team	Honda CBR1000RR-R	P			AUS	AUS	AUS	SPA	SPA	SPA	NED	NED	NED	ITA	ITA	ITA	GBR	GBR	GBR	CZE	CZE	CZE	POR	POR	POR	FRA	FRA	FRA	ITA	ITA	ITA	SPA	SPA	SPA	POR	POR	POR	SPA	SPA	SPA									
2024	Petronas MIE Racing Honda Team	Honda CBR1000RR-R	P	27	(Malaysia) Adam Norrodin	20	20	19	20	Ret	18	17	Ret	20	20	21	Ret	20	21	Ret				WD	WD	WD							WD	WD	WD										29th	0	14th	9	5th	185
2024	Petronas MIE Racing Honda Team	Honda CBR1000RR-R	P	36	(Argentina) Leandro Mercado																20	19	17																						31st	0	14th	9	5th	185
2024	Petronas MIE Racing Honda Team	Honda CBR1000RR-R	P	75	(Portugal) Ivo Lopes																			19	22	20	Ret	19	19	19	22	20				15	20	15	20	23	18				27th	2	14th	9	5th	185
2024	Petronas MIE Racing Honda Team	Honda CBR1000RR-R	P	79	(United States) Hayden Gillim																21	20	18																						34th	0	14th	9	5th	185
2024	Petronas MIE Racing Honda Team	Honda CBR1000RR-R	P	95	(United Kingdom) Tarran Mackenzie	19	Ret	18	16	20	17	14	17	11	Ret	18	19	Ret	DNS	DNS							Ret	18	18	Ret	23	Ret	18	19	18	18	19	Ret	24	21	Ret				23rd	7	14th	9	5th	185
2025	Petronas MIE Racing Honda Team	Honda CBR1000RR-R	P			AUS	AUS	AUS	POR	POR	POR	NED	NED	NED	ITA	ITA	ITA	CZE	CZE	CZE	EMI	EMI	EMI	GBR	GBR	GBR	HUN	HUN	HUN	FRA	FRA	FRA	ARA	ARA	ARA	POR	POR	POR	SPA	SPA	SPA									
2025	Petronas MIE Racing Honda Team	Honda CBR1000RR-R	P	95	(United Kingdom) Tarran Mackenzie	16	18	Ret	14	Ret	17	12	9	14	Ret	Ret	Ret	DNS	21	Ret	16	Ret	DNS																						19th	9 (45)	14th	16	5th	229
2025	Petronas MIE Racing Honda Team	Honda CBR1000RR-R	P	53	(Spain) Tito Rabat																			Ret	19	19	17	Ret	15	14	18	Ret	17	Ret	17	13	20	16	18	18	16				23rd	6 (9)	14th	16	5th	229
2025	Petronas MIE Racing Honda Team	Honda CBR1000RR-R	P	21	(Malaysia) Zaqhwan Zaidi	DNQ	DNQ	DNQ	Ret	21	16	17	19	22	20	22	20	Ret	22	Ret	17	18	17				18	17	17	15	19	18	20	19	Ret				22	21	21				26th	1	14th	16	5th	229
2025	Petronas MIE Racing Honda Team	Honda CBR1000RR-R	P	75	(Portugal) Ivo Lopes																			Ret	20	20										18	17	Ret							32nd	0	14th	16	5th	229

=== World Supersport Results ===
(key) (Races in bold indicate pole position; races in italics indicate fastest lap)

Year	Team	Bike	Tyres	No.	Riders	1		2		3		4		5		6		7		8		9		10		11		12		RC	Points	TC	Points	MC	Points
Year	Team	Bike	Tyres	No.	Riders	R1	R2	R1	R2	R1	R2	R1	R2	R1	R2	R1	R2	R1	R2	R1	R2	R1	R2	R1	R2	R1	R2	R1	R2	RC	Points	TC	Points	MC	Points
2025	Petronas MIE Honda Racing Team	Honda CBR600RR	P																																
2025	Petronas MIE Honda Racing Team	Honda CBR600RR	P			AUS	AUS	POR	POR	NED	NED	ITA	ITA	CZE	CZE	EMI	EMI	GBR	GBR	HUN	HUN	FRA	FRA	ARA	ARA	EST	EST	SPA	SPA						
2025	Petronas MIE Honda Racing Team	Honda CBR600RR	P	12	(Italy) Luca Ottaviani													21	22							Ret	23			51st	0	16th	15	6th	100
2025	Petronas MIE Honda Racing Team	Honda CBR600RR	P	27	(Japan) Kaito Toba	14	9	27	Ret	Ret	Ret	Ret	15	19	24	30	NC	16	20	Ret	14	Ret	22	22	Ret	19	21	15	14	25th	15	16th	15	6th	100
2025	Petronas MIE Honda Racing Team	Honda CBR600RR	P	63	(Malaysia) Syarifuddin Azman	17	19	Ret	25	DNS	DNS	26	Ret	24	27	29	23			21	21	21	25	26	22			27	23	36th	0	16th	15	6th	100
2025	Petronas MIE Honda Racing Team	Honda CBR600RR	P	67	(Malaysia) Ibrahim Norrodin																	24	Ret	30	28					57th	0	16th	15	6th	100
