= Motobi =

Italian motorcycle manufacturer

MotoBi
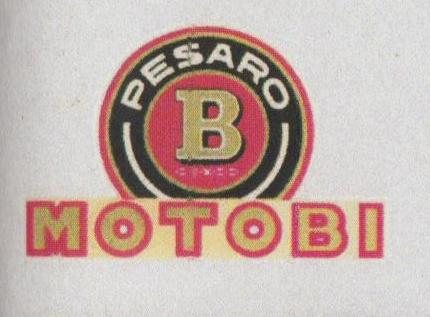
- Industry: Motorcycle
- Founded: 1949
- Headquarters: Pesaro, Italy

Motobi was an Italian motorcycle manufacturer in production between 1950 and 1977. The brand was revived by Austrian company Michael Leeb Trading GmbH in partnership with Demharter GmbH in 2010.

In 2010, as well as selling a range of 50 cc (3.1 cu in) scooters, the brand provides sponsorship for the JiR motorcycle racing team in the Moto2 class.

== Early history ==
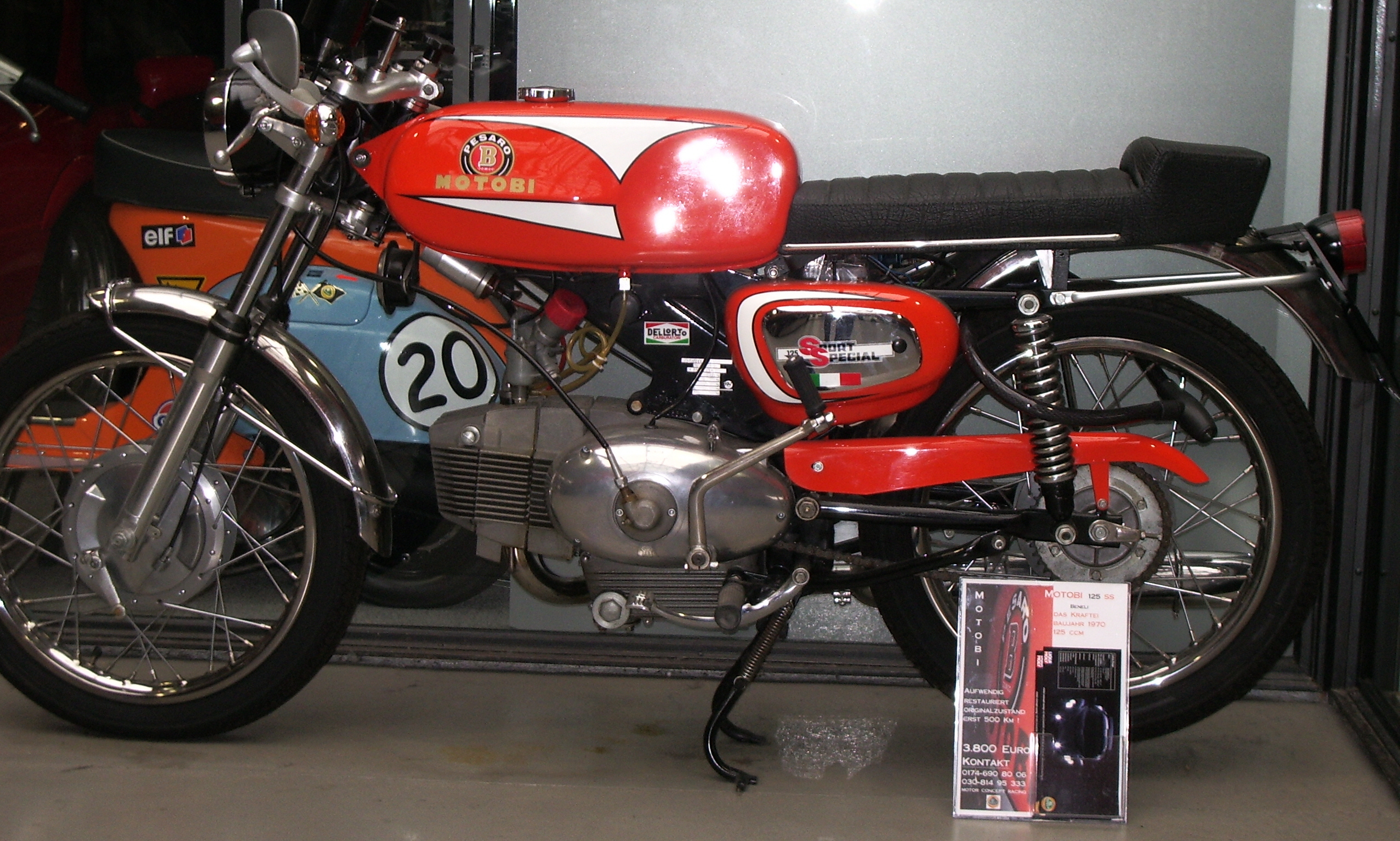
1970 Motobi 125cc Sport Special

Motobi was established in Pesaro, Italy in 1949, by Giuseppe Benelli, initially trading under the name Moto 'B' Pesaro. This was shortened to Motobi in the 1950s. After a family disagreement in 1948, Giuseppe Benelli, one of the six brothers and an engineer of some talent, decided to go his own way. He stayed in Pesaro, but moved to separate premises. Giuseppe launched the Moto 'B' marque selling small two-stroke motorcycles and scooters. In 1953, Motobi introduced a 200cc horizontal two-stroke twin called the B200 Spring Lasting. Its innovative pressed steel frame and horizontal cylinder layout were to become the trademark for many future Motobi bikes. The B200 motor was a clean, streamlined, very modern appearing unit, which was soon nicknamed the "egg" for its distinctive shape.

Giuseppe and his sons Luigi and Marco continued to work on improving Motobi products, and envisioned a four-stroke, single-cylinder variant of the B200. In late 1955, the two-stroke twin cylinder B200 was abandoned entirely, and two different new models, both called "Catria" were introduced, one at 125cc and the other at 175cc. Both were four-stroke four speed singles, designed by freelance engineer Piero Prampolini. These improved singles became the focus of Motobi production, beating Moto Aermacchi's 175cc Chimera (which had a similar horizontal single-cylinder engine configuration) to market by a year.

Not long afterward, Giuseppe Benelli died, leaving the company in the hands of his two heirs. Once in charge of the company, they hired a young former racer and tuner named Primo Zanzani to develop the new Catria machine into a factory racing machine. Italian semi-professional road racing (called MSDS for Moto Sportive Derivate dalla Serie) and road hill climbing races were popular, and the tough little motorbike was soon earning a reputation among the Italian riders, who called it the "power egg". Bright decals lauding Motobi's racing championships started appearing on the bikes' gas tanks, each version more colorful than the last.

In America, where the Eisenhower-era economy was good, sales of motorcycles and other leisure products were booming. The Benelli company saw opportunity in the New World, and also right next door, under the roof of their little cousin, Motobi. Motobi was acquired by the larger Benelli company in 1962, a move that would not only bring the family back together under the Gruppo Benelli-Motobi name, but also swell the workforce to around 550 employees, and increase production to a notable 300 machines per day. Many of these machines were exported to the United States badged as Benelli models.

== See also ==
- List of Italian companies
- List of motorcycle manufacturers
