= Alessandro Giorgi =

Italian motorcycle racer (born 1993)

- Nationality: Italian
- Born: 28 October 1993 (age 33); Cattolica, Italy

Alessandro Giorgi (born 28 October 1993) is a Grand Prix motorcycle racer from Italy.

== Career statistics ==
=== By season ===
Season	Class	Motorcycle	Team	Number	Race	Win	Podium	Pole	FLap	Pts	Plcd
2011	125cc	Aprilia	VFT Racing	27	1	0	0	0	0	0	NC
Total					1	0	0	0	0	0	

=== Races by year ===
(key)

Yr	Class	Bike	1	2	3	4	5	6	7	8	9	10	11	12	13	14	15	16	17	Pos	Pts
2011	125cc	Aprilia	QAT	SPA	POR	FRA	CAT	GBR	NED	ITA	GER	CZE	INP	RSM; 19	ARA	JPN	AUS	MAL	VAL	NC	0
