= Luca Fabrizio =

Italian motorcycle racer

- Nationality: Italian
- Born: 24 November 1992 (age 33); Rome, Italy
- Current team: Five Racing Ciatti Team
- Bike number: 92

Luca Fabrizio is a Grand Prix motorcycle racer from Italy. He races in the Italian CIV Moto3 Championship aboard a Honda NSF250R. He is the younger brother of Michel Fabrizio.

== Career statistics ==
=== By season ===
Season	Class	Motorcycle	Team	Number	Race	Win	Podium	Pole	FLap	Pts	Plcd
2011	125cc	Aprilia	WTR-Ten10 Racing	89	1	0	0	0	0	0	NC
Total					1	0	0	0	0	0	

=== Races by year ===
(key)

Yr	Class	Bike	1	2	3	4	5	6	7	8	9	10	11	12	13	14	15	16	17	Pos	Pts
2011	125cc	Aprilia	QAT	SPA	POR	FRA	CAT	GBR	NED	ITA	GER	CZE	INP	RSM	ARA	JPN; 25	AUS	MAL	VAL	NC	0
