= Takehiro Yamamoto =

Japanese motorcycle racer

- Nationality: Japanese
- Born: 26 February 1993 (age 33); Shizuoka, Japan
- Current team: YAMAHA Ikazuchi Racing
- Bike number: 11
Motorcycle racing career statistics
125cc World Championship
Active years	2010–2011
Manufacturers	Honda
Starts / Wins / Podiums / Poles / F. laps / Points; 2 / 0 / 0 / 0 / 0 / 0

Takehiro Yamamoto (山本 剛大, Yamamoto Takehiro; born 26 February 1993) is a Japanese motorcycle racer. He currently competes in the Asia Road Race AP250 Championship aboard a Honda CBR250RR. He has raced in the GP125 and J-GP3 classes of the All Japan Road Race Championship and in 2015 he was the Asia Road Racing Production 250 champion. He has also appeared in the 125cc World Championship as a wild card entry.

== Career statistics ==
=== Grand Prix motorcycle racing ===
==== By season ====
Season	Class	Motorcycle	Team	Race	Win	Podium	Pole	FLap	Pts	Plcd
2010	125cc	Honda	Team Nobby	1	0	0	0	0	0	NC
2011	125cc	Honda	Team Nobby	1	0	0	0	0	0	NC
Total				2	0	0	0	0	0	

==== Races by year ====
Year	Class	Bike	1	2	3	4	5	6	7	8	9	10	11	12	13	14	15	16	17	Pos.	Points
2010	125cc	Honda	QAT	SPA	FRA	ITA	GBR	NED	CAT	GER	CZE	INP	RSM	ARA	JPN; 17	MAL	AUS	POR	VAL	NC	0
2011	125cc	Honda	QAT	SPA	POR	FRA	CAT	GBR	NED	ITA	GER	CZE	INP	RSM	ARA	JPN; 24	AUS	MAL	VAL	NC	0
