= 2011 Grand Prix motorcycle racing season =

Sports season

2011 F.I.M. Grand Prix motorcycle racing season

Seasons
- ← 2010 2012 (MotoGP); 2012 (Moto2); 2012 (Moto3) →

2011 World Champions

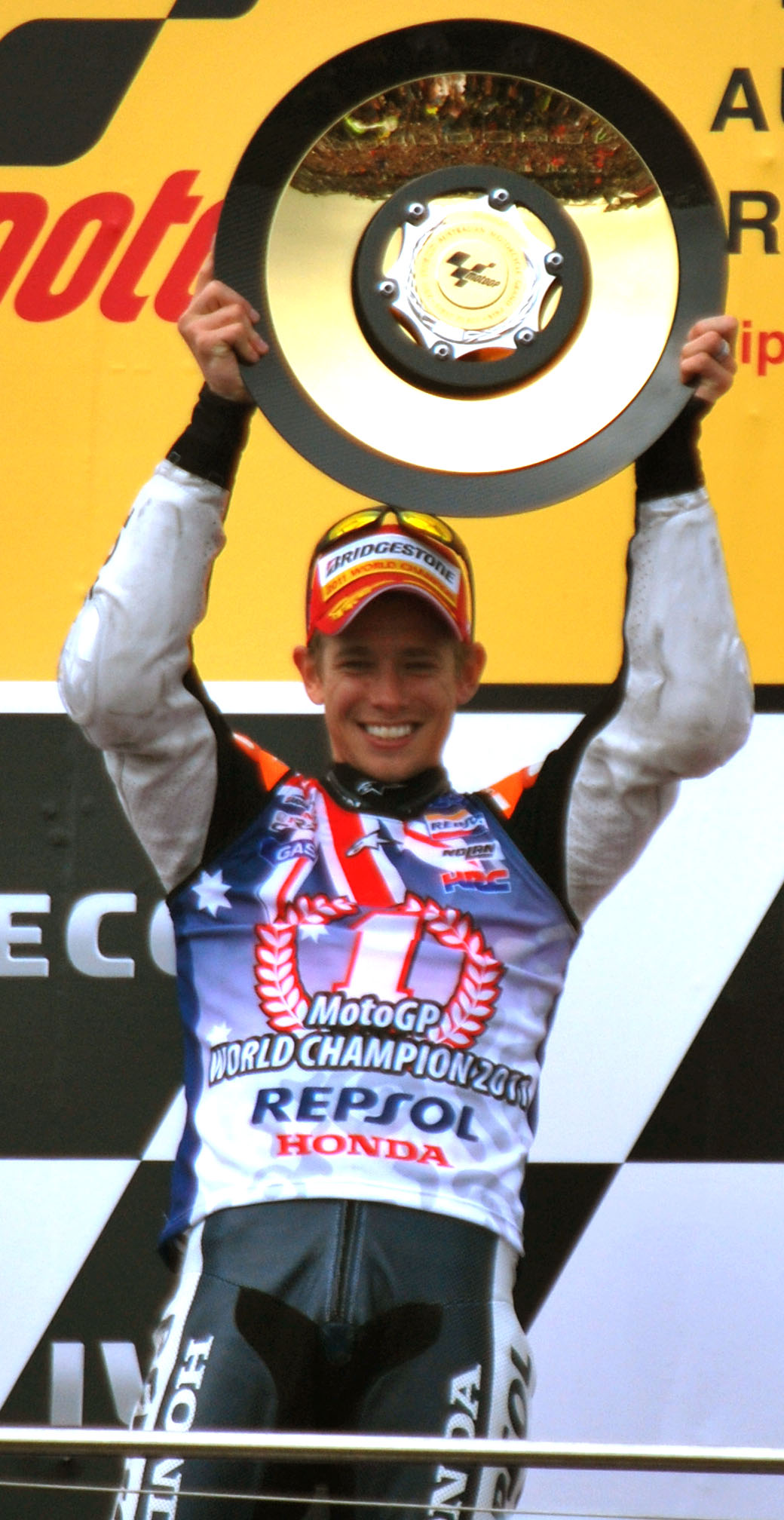
Casey Stoner was the 2011 MotoGP World Riders' Champion.

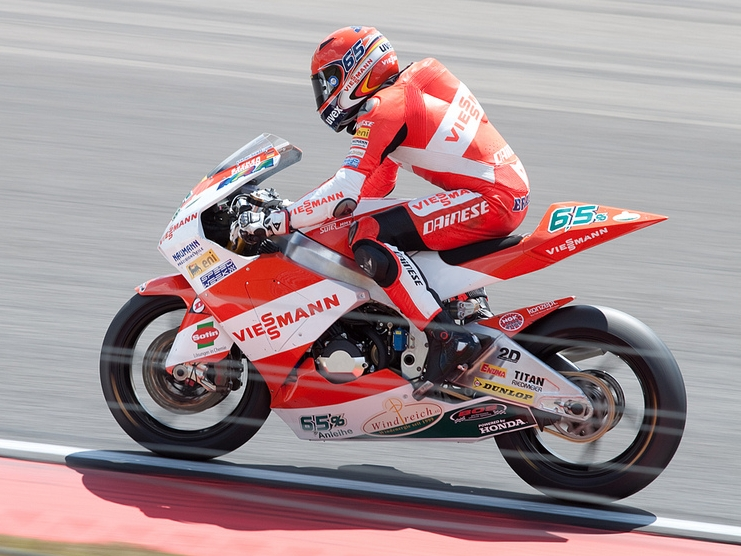
Stefan Bradl (pictured in 2010) was the 2011 Moto2 World Riders' Champion.

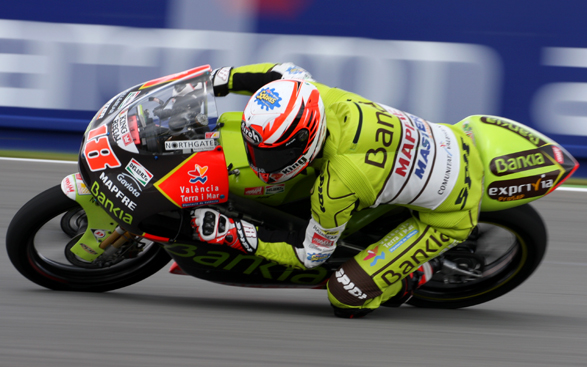
Nicolás Terol was the 2011 125cc World Riders' Champion.

The 2011 Grand Prix motorcycle racing season was the 63rd F.I.M. Road Racing World Championship season. The 2011 season was also the final season for 800cc engines in MotoGP, and also for 125cc machinery, as both MotoGP switched back to 1000cc engines and a new four-stroke Moto3 class was also introduced in 2012.

Casey Stoner was crowned as MotoGP World Champion for the second time, following his ninth victory of the season at the Australian Grand Prix. Stoner, who was champion previously in 2007, finished 16 of the 17 races to be held in the top three placings – equalling a premier class record held by both Valentino Rossi and Jorge Lorenzo – including ten wins to become the final 800cc champion before the premier class reverted to 1000cc engines in 2012. As of 2024, this was the last time the premier class was won by a non-European rider, and also the only season in the 2010s decade that the premier class was won by a rider other than Marc Márquez or Jorge Lorenzo.

The Moto2 title was decided before the final race of the season at the Valencian Grand Prix. Stefan Bradl became Germany's first motorcycle World Champion since Dirk Raudies won the 1993 125cc World Championship title after Marc Márquez, the only rider that could deny Bradl of the championship, was ruled out of the race due to injuries suffered during free practice at the Malaysian Grand Prix.

The final 125cc world championship title went to Spain's Nicolás Terol, after he finished second in the final race of the season in Valencia, and his only title rival Johann Zarco crashed out during the early stages of the race. Terol, who finished third in the class in 2009 and second to Márquez in 2010, ended the season 40 points clear of Zarco, with Maverick Viñales 14 points further behind, after winning the final two races of the season.

The season was marred by the death of Marco Simoncelli at the Malaysian Grand Prix.

== 2011 Grand Prix season calendar ==
The following Grands Prix were scheduled to take place in 2011: An 18-race provisional calendar was announced on 30 September 2010. The Japanese Grand Prix, originally scheduled for 24 April, was moved to 2 October due to the effects of the Tōhoku earthquake and the Fukushima I nuclear accidents.

Round	Date	Grand Prix	Circuit
1	20 March ‡	Commercialbank Grand Prix of Qatar	Losail International Circuit
2	3 April	Gran Premio bwin de España	Circuito de Jerez
3	1 May	bwin Portuguese Grand Prix	Autódromo do Estoril
4	15 May	Monster Energy Grand Prix de France	Bugatti Circuit
5	5 June	Gran Premi Aperol de Catalunya	Circuit de Catalunya
6	12 June	AirAsia British Grand Prix	Silverstone Circuit
7	25 June ††	Iveco TT Assen	TT Circuit Assen
8	3 July	Gran Premio d'Italia TIM	Mugello Circuit
9	17 July	eni Motorrad Grand Prix Deutschland	Sachsenring
10	24 July †	Red Bull U.S. Grand Prix	Mazda Raceway Laguna Seca
11	14 August	Cardion AB Grand Prix České republiky	Brno Circuit
12	28 August	Red Bull Indianapolis Grand Prix	Indianapolis Motor Speedway
13	4 September	Gran Premio Aperol di San Marino e Della Riviera di Rimini	Misano World Circuit
14	18 September	Gran Premio de Aragón	MotorLand Aragón
15	2 October	Grand Prix of Japan	Twin Ring Motegi
16	16 October	Iveco Australian Motorcycle Grand Prix	Phillip Island Grand Prix Circuit
17	23 October	Shell Advance Malaysian Motorcycle Grand Prix	Sepang International Circuit
18	6 November	Gran Premio Generali de la Comunitat Valenciana	Circuit Ricardo Tormo

‡ = Night race
† = MotoGP class only
†† = Saturday Race

=== Calendar changes ===
- The Portuguese Grand Prix was moved forward, from 31 October to 1 May.
- The Italian Grand Prix was moved back, from 6 June to 3 July.
- The Catalan Grand Prix was moved forward, from 4 July to 5 June.
- Only the MotoGP class raced during the United States Grand Prix because of California state and Monterey County (owner of the circuit) laws regarding emissions standards and paddock space at the circuit, preventing the 125cc and Moto2 classes from racing.

== 2011 Grand Prix season results ==
Round	Date	Grand Prix	Circuit	125cc winner	Moto2 winner	MotoGP winner	Report
1	20 March ‡	Qatar motorcycle Grand Prix	Losail	Nicolás Terol	Stefan Bradl	Casey Stoner	Report
2	3 April	Spanish motorcycle Grand Prix	Jerez	Nicolás Terol	Andrea Iannone	Jorge Lorenzo	Report
3	1 May	Portuguese motorcycle Grand Prix	Estoril	Nicolás Terol	Stefan Bradl	Dani Pedrosa	Report
4	15 May	French motorcycle Grand Prix	Le Mans	Maverick Viñales	Marc Márquez	Casey Stoner	Report
5	5 June	Catalan motorcycle Grand Prix	Catalunya	Nicolás Terol	Stefan Bradl	Casey Stoner	Report
6	12 June	British motorcycle Grand Prix	Silverstone	Jonas Folger	Stefan Bradl	Casey Stoner	Report
7	25 June ††	Dutch TT	Assen	Maverick Viñales	Marc Márquez	Ben Spies	Report
8	3 July	Italian motorcycle Grand Prix	Mugello	Nicolás Terol	Marc Márquez	Jorge Lorenzo	Report
9	17 July	German motorcycle Grand Prix	Sachsenring	Héctor Faubel	Marc Márquez	Dani Pedrosa	Report
10	24 July †	United States motorcycle Grand Prix	Laguna Seca	No 125cc and Moto2 race		Casey Stoner	Report
11	14 August	Czech Republic motorcycle Grand Prix	Brno	Sandro Cortese	Andrea Iannone	Casey Stoner	Report
12	28 August	Indianapolis motorcycle Grand Prix	Indianapolis	Nicolás Terol	Marc Márquez	Casey Stoner	Report
13	4 September	San Marino and Rimini Riviera motorcycle Grand Prix	Misano	Nicolás Terol	Marc Márquez	Jorge Lorenzo	Report
14	18 September	Aragon motorcycle Grand Prix	MotorLand Aragón	Nicolás Terol	Marc Márquez	Casey Stoner	Report
15	2 October	Japanese motorcycle Grand Prix	Motegi	Johann Zarco	Andrea Iannone	Dani Pedrosa	Report
16	16 October	Australian motorcycle Grand Prix	Phillip Island	Sandro Cortese	Alex de Angelis	Casey Stoner	Report
17	23 October	Malaysian motorcycle Grand Prix	Sepang	Maverick Viñales	Thomas Lüthi	Race cancelled (Note: The original attempt to run the race was interrupted on lap two, after an accident that killed Marco Simoncelli. It was found impossible to restart the race and was thus cancelled per the championship's sporting regulations.)	Report
18	6 November	Valencian Community motorcycle Grand Prix	Valencia	Maverick Viñales	Michele Pirro	Casey Stoner	Report

‡ = Night race
† = MotoGP class only
†† = Saturday Race

Footnotes

== Participants ==
=== MotoGP participants ===
- A 17-rider provisional entry list was released on 24 January 2011. Seven-time MotoGP champion Valentino Rossi rode for the factory Ducati team, whilst Casey Stoner, winner of the MotoGP championship in 2007, moved to the factory Honda team. Jorge Lorenzo, Dani Pedrosa, and Andrea Dovizioso retained their seats at the factory Yamaha and Honda teams respectively. Former World Superbike champion Ben Spies moved from the Tech 3 Yamaha team to the factory Yamaha team. Moto2 champion in 2010, Toni Elías returned to the MotoGP class with LCR Team, while Karel Abraham also moved up from Moto2, as he signed a contract to ride a privateer Ducati in 2011.

Team	Constructor	Motorcycle	No.	Rider	Rounds
Ducati Team	Ducati	Desmosedici GP11	46	Valentino Rossi	All
Ducati Team	Ducati	Desmosedici GP11	69	Nicky Hayden	All
Pramac Racing Team	Ducati	Desmosedici GP11	14	Randy de Puniet	All
Pramac Racing Team	Ducati	Desmosedici GP11	65	Loris Capirossi	1–7, 10–14, 16–18
Pramac Racing Team	Ducati	Desmosedici GP11	50	Sylvain Guintoli	9
Pramac Racing Team	Ducati	Desmosedici GP11	6	Damian Cudlin	15
Mapfre Aspar Team MotoGP	Ducati	Desmosedici GP11	8	Héctor Barberá	1–15, 17–18
Mapfre Aspar Team MotoGP	Ducati	Desmosedici GP11	6	Damian Cudlin	16
Cardion AB Motoracing	Ducati	Desmosedici GP11	17	Karel Abraham	All
Repsol Honda Team	Honda	RC212V	4	Andrea Dovizioso	All
Repsol Honda Team	Honda	RC212V	26	Dani Pedrosa	1–4, 8–18
Repsol Honda Team	Honda	RC212V	7	Hiroshi Aoyama	7
Repsol Honda Team	Honda	RC212V	27	Casey Stoner	All
Honda Racing Team	Honda	RC212V	72	Shinichi Ito	15
San Carlo Honda Gresini	Honda	RC212V	7	Hiroshi Aoyama	1–6, 8–18
San Carlo Honda Gresini	Honda	RC212V	64	Kousuke Akiyoshi	7
San Carlo Honda Gresini	Honda	RC212V	58	Marco Simoncelli	1–17
LCR Honda MotoGP	Honda	RC212V	24	Toni Elías	All
LCR Honda MotoGP	Honda	RC212V	23	Ben Bostrom	10
LCR Honda MotoGP	Honda	RC212V	64	Kousuke Akiyoshi	15
Rizla Suzuki MotoGP	Suzuki	GSV-R	19	Álvaro Bautista	1, 3–18
Rizla Suzuki MotoGP	Suzuki	GSV-R	21	John Hopkins	2
Rizla Suzuki MotoGP	Suzuki	GSV-R	21	John Hopkins	11, 17
Yamaha Factory Racing	Yamaha	YZR-M1	1	Jorge Lorenzo	1–16
Yamaha Factory Racing	Yamaha	YZR-M1	89	Katsuyuki Nakasuga	17–18
Yamaha Factory Racing	Yamaha	YZR-M1	11	Ben Spies	All
Monster Yamaha Tech 3	Yamaha	YZR-M1	5	Colin Edwards	1–17
Monster Yamaha Tech 3	Yamaha	YZR-M1	41	Josh Hayes	18
Monster Yamaha Tech 3	Yamaha	YZR-M1	35	Cal Crutchlow	All

Key
Regular rider
Wildcard rider
Replacement rider

All entries used Bridgestone tyres.

^{1} Being his final MotoGP race, Capirossi switched numbers for Valencia as a memorial to his fallen countryman Simoncelli, killed at Sepang, by racing with the #58 that Simoncelli used, instead of his normal #65. He was still shown as #65 in official timing documentation.

==== Rider changes ====
- Hiroshi Aoyama moved from Interwetten Honda MotoGP Team to San Carlo Honda Gresini, still riding a Honda.
- Ben Spies was promoted by Yamaha from Monster Yamaha Tech 3 to the factory team.
- Randy de Puniet joined Pramac Racing Team, coming from LCR Honda MotoGP.
- Karel Abraham moved up from Moto2 with his father's team, riding a Ducati.
- Moto2 reigning champion Toni Elías returned to the MotoGP category, joining team LCR Honda MotoGP.
- Casey Stoner left Ducati factory team to join Repsol Honda Team.
- Cal Crutchlow debuted in MotoGP with Monster Yamaha Tech 3, moving across from the Superbike World Championship.
- After seven seasons, Valentino Rossi left Yamaha Factory Racing to join Ducati Team.
- Loris Capirossi returned to Ducati, riding for Pramac Racing Team moving across from Rizla Suzuki.

=== Moto2 participants ===
On 31 October 2010, a list of 22 teams was accepted by the Fédération Internationale de Motocyclisme, Dorna Sports, and IRTA to compete in the 2011 championship. A 38-rider provisional entry list was released on 24 January 2011. All Moto2 competitors raced with an identical CBR600RR inline-four engine developed by Honda. Teams competed with tyres supplied by Dunlop.

Team	Constructor	Motorcycle	No.	Rider	Rounds
IodaRacing Project	FTR	FTR Moto M211	3	Simone Corsi	1–9, 11–18
IodaRacing Project	FTR	FTR Moto M211	75	Mattia Pasini	1–9, 11–18
GP Team Switzerland Kiefer Racing; Viessmann Kiefer Racing	Kalex	Kalex Moto2	4	Randy Krummenacher	1–9, 11–18
GP Team Switzerland Kiefer Racing; Viessmann Kiefer Racing	Kalex	Kalex Moto2	65	Stefan Bradl	1–9, 11–18
Avintia-STX; Blusens-STX	FTR	FTR Moto M211	6	Joan Olivé	13
Avintia-STX; Blusens-STX	FTR	FTR Moto M211	9	Kenny Noyes	1–9, 11–18
Avintia-STX; Blusens-STX	FTR	FTR Moto M211	10	Martín Cárdenas	12
Avintia-STX; Blusens-STX	FTR	FTR Moto M211	34	Esteve Rabat	1–9, 11–18
Avintia-STX; Blusens-STX	FTR	FTR Moto M211	68	Yonny Hernández	1–9, 11, 14–18
Aeroport de Castelló	FTR	FTR Moto M211	6	Joan Olivé	14–18
Aeroport de Castelló	FTR	FTR Moto M211	24	Tommaso Lorenzetti	8–9, 11
Aeroport de Castelló	FTR	FTR Moto M211	32	Jacob Gagne	13
Aeroport de Castelló	FTR	FTR Moto M211	49	Kev Coghlan	1–7
Aeroport de Castelló	FTR	FTR Moto M211	73	J. D. Beach	12
CIP with TSR	TSR	TSR TSR6	7	Tomoyoshi Koyama	15
Technomag-CIP	Suter	Suter MMXI	7	Tomoyoshi Koyama	13–14
Technomag-CIP	Suter	Suter MMXI	54	Kenan Sofuoğlu	1–9, 11–12, 15–18
Technomag-CIP	Suter	Suter MMXI	77	Dominique Aegerter	1–9, 11–18
QMMF Racing Team	Moriwaki	Moriwaki MD600	8	Alex Cudlin	4
QMMF Racing Team	Moriwaki	Moriwaki MD600	88	Ricard Cardús	1–5, 7–9, 11–17
QMMF Racing Team	Moriwaki	Moriwaki MD600	95	Mashel Al Naimi	1–9, 11–18
QMMF Racing Team	Moriwaki	Moriwaki MD600	96	Nasser Al Malki	1
QMMF Racing Team	Moriwaki	Moriwaki MD600	96	Nasser Al Malki	6, 18
Interwetten Paddock Moto2	Suter	Suter MMXI	12	Thomas Lüthi	1–9, 11–18
MZ Racing Team	MZ-RE Honda	MZ Moto2	13	Anthony West	1–3
MZ Racing Team	MZ-RE Honda	FTR Moto M210	13	Anthony West	4–9, 11–18
MZ Racing Team	MZ-RE Honda	FTR Moto M210	76	Max Neukirchner	1–9, 11–18
Thai Honda Singha SAG; SAG Team	FTR	FTR Moto M211	14	Ratthapark Wilairot	1–9, 11–16, 18
Thai Honda Singha SAG; SAG Team	FTR	FTR Moto M211	23	Apiwat Wongthananon	17
Thai Honda Singha SAG; SAG Team	FTR	FTR Moto M211	35	Raffaele de Rosa	6
Thai Honda Singha SAG; SAG Team	FTR	FTR Moto M211	64	Santiago Hernández	1–5, 7–9, 11–18
JiR Moto2	Motobi	TSR TSR6	15	Alex de Angelis	1–9, 11–18
NGM Forward Racing	Suter	Suter MMXI	16	Jules Cluzel	1–9, 11–18
NGM Forward Racing	Suter	Suter MMXI	25	Alex Baldolini	1–9, 11
NGM Forward Racing	Suter	Suter MMXI	35	Raffaele de Rosa	12–18
Mapfre Aspar Team Moto2	Suter	Suter MMXI	18	Jordi Torres	6, 8–9, 11–18
Mapfre Aspar Team Moto2	Suter	Suter MMXI	20	Iván Moreno	16–17
Mapfre Aspar Team Moto2	Suter	Suter MMXI	21	Javier Forés	1–7
Mapfre Aspar Team Moto2	Suter	Suter MMXI	35	Raffaele de Rosa	8
Mapfre Aspar Team Moto2	Suter	Suter MMXI	60	Julián Simón	1–5, 9, 11–14, 18
Mapfre Aspar Team Moto2	Suter	Suter MMXI	82	Elena Rosell	7
Mapfre Aspar Team Moto2	Suter	Suter MMXI	82	Elena Rosell	14, 18
Tech 3 B Tech 3 Racing	Tech 3	Tech 3 Mistral 610	19	Xavier Siméon	1–9, 11–18
Tech 3 B Tech 3 Racing	Tech 3	Tech 3 Mistral 610	38	Bradley Smith	1–9, 11–18
Tech 3 B Tech 3 Racing	Tech 3	Tech 3 Mistral 610	63	Mike Di Meglio	1–9, 11–18
Andreozzi Reparto Corse	FTR	FTR Moto M211	22	Alessandro Andreozzi	13
G22 Racing Team; Desguaces La Torre G22	Moriwaki	Moriwaki MD600	25	Alex Baldolini	18
G22 Racing Team; Desguaces La Torre G22	Moriwaki	Moriwaki MD600	31	Carmelo Morales	5–8, 12–13
G22 Racing Team; Desguaces La Torre G22	Suter	Suter MMXI	31	Carmelo Morales	9, 11
G22 Racing Team; Desguaces La Torre G22	Moriwaki	Moriwaki MD600	33	Sergio Gadea	14–15
G22 Racing Team; Desguaces La Torre G22	Moriwaki	Moriwaki MD600	35	Raffaele de Rosa	1–4
G22 Racing Team; Desguaces La Torre G22	Moriwaki	Moriwaki MD600	99	Łukasz Wargala	2–3
Pons HP 40	Pons Kalex	Kalex Moto2	25	Alex Baldolini	12–14
Pons HP 40	Pons Kalex	Kalex Moto2	40	Aleix Espargaró	1–9, 11–18
Pons HP 40	Pons Kalex	Kalex Moto2	80	Axel Pons	1–9, 11, 15–18
Speed Master	Suter	Suter MMXI	29	Andrea Iannone	1–9, 11–18
Italtrans Racing Team	Suter	Suter MMXI	30	Takaaki Nakagami	15
Italtrans Racing Team	Suter	Suter MMXI	39	Robertino Pietri	1–9, 11–18
Italtrans Racing Team	Suter	Suter MMXI	71	Claudio Corti	1–9, 11–14, 16–18
GPTech	FTR	FTR Moto M211	32	Jacob Gagne	12
Marc VDS Racing Team	Suter	Suter MMXI	36	Mika Kallio	1–9, 11–18
Marc VDS Racing Team	Suter	Suter MMXI	45	Scott Redding	1–9, 11–18
BRP Racing	Suter	Suter MMXI	43	Kris McLaren	16
BRP Racing	FTR	FTR Moto M210	56	Blake Leigh-Smith	16
HP Tuenti Speed Up; Speed Up	FTR	FTR Moto M211	44	Pol Espargaró	1–9, 11–18
HP Tuenti Speed Up; Speed Up	FTR	FTR Moto M211	53	Valentin Debise	1–9, 11–18
Gresini Racing Moto2	Moriwaki	Moriwaki MD600	51	Michele Pirro	1–9, 11–18
Gresini Racing Moto2	Moriwaki	Moriwaki MD600	72	Yuki Takahashi	1–9, 11–18
Team Climent	MIR Racing	MIR Moto2	61	Óscar Climent	18
EAB Racing	Ten Kate	Ten Kate Moto2	66	Michael van der Mark	7
Faenza Racing	Suter	Suter MMXI	70	Mattia Tarozzi	8
Petronas Malaysia	Moriwaki	Moriwaki MD600	86	Hafizh Syahrin	17
Petronas Malaysia	Moriwaki	Moriwaki MD600	87	Mohamad Zamri Baba	17
Team CatalunyaCaixa Repsol	Suter	Suter MMXI	93	Marc Márquez	1–9, 11–18
MS Racing	Suter	Suter MMXI	97	Steven Odendaal	2–4, 7, 9, 11

Key
Regular rider
Wildcard rider
Replacement rider

=== 125cc participants ===
- A 32-rider provisional entry list was released on 24 January 2011.

Team	Constructor	Motorcycle	No.	Rider	Rounds
Team Italia FMI	Aprilia	Aprilia RSW 125	3	Luigi Morciano	1–9, 11–18
Team Italia FMI	Aprilia	Aprilia RSW 125	19	Alessandro Tonucci	1–9, 11–18
Avant-AirAsia-Ajo; AirAsia-SIC-Ajo; Red Bull Ajo Motorsport	Derbi	Derbi RSA 125	5	Johann Zarco	1–9, 11–18
Avant-AirAsia-Ajo; AirAsia-SIC-Ajo; Red Bull Ajo Motorsport	Derbi	Derbi RSA 125	7	Efrén Vázquez	1–9, 11–18
Avant-AirAsia-Ajo; AirAsia-SIC-Ajo; Red Bull Ajo Motorsport	Aprilia	Aprilia RSW 125	52	Danny Kent	1–9, 15–18
Avant-AirAsia-Ajo; AirAsia-SIC-Ajo; Red Bull Ajo Motorsport	Aprilia	Aprilia RSA 125	52	Danny Kent	11–14
Avant-AirAsia-Ajo; AirAsia-SIC-Ajo; Red Bull Ajo Motorsport	Derbi	Derbi RSW 125	63	Zulfahmi Khairuddin	1–9, 11–18
Avant-AirAsia-Ajo; AirAsia-SIC-Ajo; Red Bull Ajo Motorsport	Aprilia	Aprilia RSA 125	94	Jonas Folger	1–9, 11–18
Caretta Technology Forward Team; Caretta Technology; Caretta Technology Race Dept.	KTM	KTM 125 FRR	8	Jack Miller	13, 15–18
Caretta Technology Forward Team; Caretta Technology; Caretta Technology Race Dept.	KTM	KTM 125 FRR	10	Alexis Masbou	5–9, 11–18
Caretta Technology Forward Team; Caretta Technology; Caretta Technology Race Dept.	KTM	KTM 125 FRR	12	Daniel Kartheininger	1–2
Caretta Technology Forward Team; Caretta Technology; Caretta Technology Race Dept.	KTM	KTM 125 FRR	56	Péter Sebestyén	3–9, 11–12
Caretta Technology Forward Team; Caretta Technology; Caretta Technology Race Dept.	KTM	KTM 125 FRR	76	Hiroki Ono	1–4
Caretta Technology Forward Team; Caretta Technology; Caretta Technology Race Dept.	KTM	KTM 125 FRR	90	Damien Raemy	14
WTR-Ten10 Racing	Aprilia	Aprilia RSW 125	10	Alexis Masbou	4
WTR-Ten10 Racing	Aprilia	Aprilia RSW 125	40	Marco Colandrea	16–18
WTR-Ten10 Racing	Aprilia	Aprilia RSW 125	43	Francesco Mauriello	1–9, 11–14
WTR-Ten10 Racing	Aprilia	Aprilia RSW 125	50	Sturla Fagerhaug	5–9, 11–18
WTR-Ten10 Racing	Aprilia	Aprilia RSW 125	69	Sarath Kumar	1–3
WTR-Ten10 Racing	Aprilia	Aprilia RSW 125	89	Luca Fabrizio	15
Intact-Racing Team Germany	Aprilia	Aprilia RSA 125	11	Sandro Cortese	1–9, 11–18
Team Murcia Pramac	Aprilia	Aprilia RSW 125	13	Juan Francisco Guevara	18
Andalucia Banca Civica	Aprilia	Aprilia RSA 125	14	Brad Binder	15–18
Andalucia Banca Civica	Aprilia	Aprilia RSA 125	23	Alberto Moncayo	1–9, 11–18
Andalucia Banca Civica	Aprilia	Aprilia RSA 125	28	Josep Rodríguez	7
Andalucia Banca Civica	Aprilia	Aprilia RSA 125	44	Miguel Oliveira	1–5, 8–9, 11–14
RW Racing GP	Aprilia	Aprilia RSA 125	14	Brad Binder	12
RW Racing GP	Aprilia	Aprilia RSA 125	39	Luis Salom	1–9, 11, 13–18
Phonica Racing	Aprilia	Aprilia RSA 125	15	Simone Grotzkyj	1–9, 11–13
Phonica Racing	Aprilia	Aprilia RSW 125	17	Taylor Mackenzie	1–9, 11–18
Phonica Racing	Aprilia	Aprilia RSW 125	30	Giulian Pedone	1–9, 11–18
Phonica Racing	Aprilia	Aprilia RSW 125	60	Manuel Tatasciore	11, 13
Phonica Racing	Aprilia	Aprilia RSW 125	60	Manuel Tatasciore	14, 16–18
Phonica Racing	Aprilia	Aprilia RSW 125	65	Syunya Mori	15
Bankia Aspar Team	Aprilia	Aprilia RSA 125	18	Nicolás Terol	1–9, 11–18
Bankia Aspar Team	Aprilia	Aprilia RSA 125	26	Adrián Martín	1–9, 11–18
Bankia Aspar Team	Aprilia	Aprilia RSA 125	55	Héctor Faubel	1–9, 11–18
Ongetta-Centro Seta	Aprilia	Aprilia RSW 125	21	Harry Stafford	1–9, 11–18
Ongetta-Centro Seta	Aprilia	Aprilia RSW 125	84	Jakub Kornfeil	1–9, 11–18
Nordgren Racing	Honda	Honda RS125R	22	Emil Petersen	18
RJR Racing	Aprilia	Aprilia RSW 125	24	Ladislav Chmelík	11
Pev-Blusens-SMX-Paris Hilton; Blusens by Paris Hilton Racing	Aprilia	Aprilia RSA 125	25	Maverick Viñales	1–9, 11–18
Pev-Blusens-SMX-Paris Hilton; Blusens by Paris Hilton Racing	Aprilia	Aprilia RSA 125	28	Josep Rodríguez	14–18
Pev-Blusens-SMX-Paris Hilton; Blusens by Paris Hilton Racing	Aprilia	Aprilia RSA 125	33	Sergio Gadea	1–9, 11–13
VFT Racing	Aprilia	Aprilia RSW 125	27	Alessandro Giorgi	13
Wild Wolf-RACC-MS	Aprilia	Aprilia RSW 125	28	Josep Rodríguez	2, 5
TT Motion Events Racing	Aprilia	Aprilia RSW 125	31	Niklas Ajo	1–9, 11–16, 18
TT Motion Events Racing	Aprilia	Aprilia RSW 125	32	Arthur Sissis	17
Larresport	Honda	Honda RS125R	34	Daniel Ruiz	2, 18
Matteoni Racing	Aprilia	Aprilia RSW 125	36	Joan Perelló	1–9, 11–17
Matteoni Racing	Aprilia	Aprilia RSW 125	56	Peter Sebestyén	18
Matteoni Racing	Aprilia	Aprilia RSW 125	96	Louis Rossi	1–9, 11–18
Turismo de Aragon – DVJ	Aprilia	Aprilia RSW 125	37	Pedro Rodríguez	14
Freudenberg Racing Team	KTM	KTM 125 FRR	41	Luca Gruenwald	7, 9, 11
Freudenberg Racing Team	KTM	KTM 125 FRR	42	Toni Finsterbusch	9
Fastline GP Racing	Honda	Honda RS125R	45	Tom Hatton	16
HookRacing.com	Aprilia	Aprilia RSW 125	46	Josh Hook	16
Aprilia RSW Racing	Aprilia	Aprilia RSW 125	47	Nicky Diles	16
Phillis QBE Racing	Aprilia	Aprilia RSW 125	48	Alex Phillis	16
Avalon Biddle Racing	Honda	Honda RS125R	49	Avalon Biddle	16
Dutch Racing Team	Honda	Honda RS125R	51	Bryan Schouten	7
Ongetta-Abbink Metaal	Aprilia	Aprilia RSA 125	53	Jasper Iwema	1–9, 11–18
RV Racing Team	Honda	Honda RS125R	61	Ernst Dubbink	7
AirAsia SLC EVO	Derbi	Derbi RSW 125	64	Farid Badrul	17
JerrysRacingTeam	Honda	Honda RS125R	67	Jerry van de Bunt	7
LHF Project Racing	Honda	Honda RS125R	70	Marvin Fritz	9
Racing Steps Foundation KRP	Aprilia	Aprilia RSW 125	71	John McPhee	5–6, 18
RZT Racing	Aprilia	Aprilia RSW 125	73	Jack Miller	9
MGP Racing	Aprilia	Aprilia RSW 125	74	Kevin Calia	8, 13
RacingTeam Van Leeuwen	Honda	Honda RS125R	75	Thomas van Leeuwen	7
Mahindra Racing	Mahindra	Mahindra GP125	77	Marcel Schrötter	1–9, 11–18
Mahindra Racing	Mahindra	Mahindra GP125	99	Danny Webb	1–9, 11–18
Schwaben Racing Team	Honda	Honda RS125R	78	Felix Forstenhäusler	9
Team Nobby	Honda	Honda RS125R	79	Takehiro Yamamoto	15
Project u 7C HARC	Honda	Honda RS125R	80	Jun Ohnishi	15
Project u 7C HARC	Honda	Honda RS125R	81	Hyuga Watanabe	15
18 Garage Racing Team	Honda	Honda RS125R	82	Hikari Okubo	15
AMK Brno Junior Team	Honda	Honda RS125R	83	Jakub Jantulík	11
Team Hanusch	Honda	Honda RS125R	86	Kevin Hanus	2–3, 5, 14, 18
Faenza Racing	Aprilia	Aprilia RSW 125	88	Massimo Parziani	8, 13
Maxiscoot MVT Racing	Aprilia	Aprilia RSW 125	91	Kévin Szalaï	4
Team RMS	Honda	Honda RS125R	92	Kevin Thobois	4
Ellegi Racing	Aprilia	Aprilia RSW 125	95	Miroslav Popov	8, 11, 13

Key
Regular rider
Wildcard rider
Replacement rider

All entries used Dunlop tyres.

== Standings ==
=== MotoGP standings ===
Scoring system

Points were awarded to the top fifteen finishers. Rider had to finish the race to earn points.

Position	**1st**	**2nd**	**3rd**	**4th**	**5th**	**6th**	**7th**	**8th**	**9th**	**10th**	**11th**	**12th**	**13th**	**14th**	**15th**
Points	25	20	16	13	11	10	9	8	7	6	5	4	3	2	1

==== Riders' standings ====
- Rounds marked with a light blue background were under wet race conditions or stopped by rain.
- Riders marked with light blue background were eligible for Rookie of the Year awards.

Pos	Rider	Bike	Team	QAT	SPA	POR	FRA	CAT	GBR	NED	ITA	GER	USA	CZE	INP	RSM	ARA	JPN	AUS	MAL	VAL	Pts
1	Casey Stoner	Honda	Repsol Honda Team	**1**	**Ret**	3	**1**	1	**1**	2	**3**	**3**	1	1	**1**	**3**	**1**	**3**	**1**	C	**1**	350
2	Jorge Lorenzo	Yamaha	Yamaha Factory Racing	2	1	**2**	4	2	Ret	6	1	2	**2**	4	4	1	3	2	DNS			260
3	Andrea Dovizioso	Honda	Repsol Honda Team	4	12	4	2	4	2	3	2	4	5	2	5	5	Ret	5	3	C	3	228
4	Dani Pedrosa	Honda	Repsol Honda Team	3	2	1	Ret				8	1	3	**Ret**	2	2	2	1	4	**C**	5	219
5	Ben Spies	Yamaha	Yamaha Factory Racing	6	Ret	Ret	6	3	Ret	1	4	5	4	5	3	6	5	6	DNS	C	2	176
6	Marco Simoncelli^{†}	Honda	San Carlo Honda Gresini	5	Ret	Ret	5	**6**	Ret	**9**	5	6	Ret	3	12	4	4	4	2	C^{†}		139
7	Valentino Rossi	Ducati	Ducati Team	7	5	5	3	5	6	4	6	9	6	6	10	7	10	Ret	Ret	C	Ret	139
8	Nicky Hayden	Ducati	Ducati Team	9	3	9	7	8	4	5	10	8	7	7	14	Ret	7	7	7	C	Ret	132
9	Colin Edwards	Yamaha	Monster Yamaha Tech 3	8	Ret	6	13	DNS	3	7	9	10	8	8	7	13	13	8	5	C		109
10	Hiroshi Aoyama	Honda	San Carlo Honda Gresini	10	4	7	8	Ret	9		11	15	10	9	9	11	11	9	Ret	C	12	98
10	Hiroshi Aoyama	Honda	Repsol Honda Team							8												98
11	Héctor Barberá	Ducati	Mapfre Aspar Team MotoGP	12	6	Ret	9	11	11	12	7	11	9	10	Ret	9	8	Ret		C	11	82
12	Cal Crutchlow	Yamaha	Monster Yamaha Tech 3	11	8	8	Ret	7	DNS	14	Ret	14	Ret	Ret	11	10	9	11	Ret	C	4	70
13	Álvaro Bautista	Suzuki	Rizla Suzuki MotoGP	DNS		13	12	12	5	11	13	7	Ret	Ret	6	8	6	Ret	Ret	C	Ret	67
14	Karel Abraham	Ducati	Cardion AB Motoracing	13	7	Ret	10	10	7	Ret	12	12	11	Ret	Ret	12	Ret	DNS	10	C	8	64
15	Toni Elías	Honda	LCR Honda MotoGP	Ret	9	11	11	13	8	10	15	16	13	11	13	15	Ret	Ret	8	C	10	61
16	Randy de Puniet	Ducati	Pramac Racing Team	Ret	Ret	10	Ret	Ret	12	Ret	14	13	DNS	12	8	14	12	10	6	C	Ret	49
17	Loris Capirossi	Ducati	Pramac Racing Team	Ret	11	12	Ret	9	10	DNS			12	13	Ret	Ret	Ret		9	C	9	43
18	Katsuyuki Nakasuga	Yamaha	Yamaha Factory Racing																	C	6	10
19	Josh Hayes	Yamaha	Monster Yamaha Tech 3																		7	9
20	Kousuke Akiyoshi	Honda	San Carlo Honda Gresini							13												7
20	Kousuke Akiyoshi	Honda	LCR Honda MotoGP															12				7
21	John Hopkins	Suzuki	Rizla Suzuki MotoGP		10									DNS						C		6
22	Shinichi Ito	Honda	Honda Racing Team															13				3
	Sylvain Guintoli	Ducati	Pramac Racing Team									17										0
	Damian Cudlin	Ducati	Pramac Racing Team															Ret				0
	Damian Cudlin	Ducati	Mapfre Aspar Team MotoGP																DNS			0
	Ben Bostrom	Honda	LCR Honda MotoGP										Ret									0
Pos	Rider	Bike	Team	QAT	SPA	POR	FRA	CAT	GBR	NED	ITA	GER	USA	CZE	INP	RSM	ARA	JPN	AUS	MAL	VAL	Pts

Colour	Result
Gold	Winner
Silver	2nd place
Bronze	3rd place
Green	Points finish
Blue	Non-points finish
Blue	Non-classified finish (NC)
Purple	Retired (Ret)
Red	Did not qualify (DNQ)
Red	Did not pre-qualify (DNPQ)
Black	Disqualified (DSQ)
White	Did not start (DNS)
White	Withdrew (WD)
White	Race cancelled (C)
Blank	Did not participate (DNP)
Blank	Excluded (EX)

**Bold** – Pole position
Italics – Fastest lap

- † – Marco Simoncelli was fatally injured during the Malaysian Grand Prix and the race was abandoned as a result.

==== Constructors' standings ====
- Each constructor got the same number of points as their best placed rider in each race.
- Rounds marked with a light blue background were under wet race conditions or stopped by rain.

Pos	Constructor	QAT	SPA	POR	FRA	CAT	GBR	NED	ITA	GER	USA	CZE	INP	RSM	ARA	JPN	AUS	MAL	VAL	Pts
1	Honda	1	2	1	1	1	1	2	2	1	1	1	1	2	1	1	1	C	1	405
2	Yamaha	2	1	2	4	2	3	1	1	2	2	4	3	1	3	2	5	C	2	325
3	Ducati	7	3	5	3	5	4	4	6	8	6	6	8	7	7	7	6	C	8	180
4	Suzuki	DNS	10	13	12	12	5	11	13	7	Ret	Ret	6	8	6	Ret	Ret	C	Ret	73
Pos	Constructor	QAT	SPA	POR	FRA	CAT	GBR	NED	ITA	GER	USA	CZE	INP	RSM	ARA	JPN	AUS	MAL	VAL	Pts

==== Teams' standings ====
- Each team got the total points scored by their two riders, including replacement riders. In one rider team, only the points scored by that rider was counted. Wildcard riders did not score points.
- Rounds marked with a light blue background were under wet race conditions or stopped by rain.

Pos	Team	Bike No.	QAT	SPA	POR	FRA	CAT	GBR	NED	ITA	GER	USA	CZE	INP	RSM	ARA	JPN	AUS	MAL	VAL	Pts
1	Repsol Honda Team	4	4	12	4	2	4	2	3	2	4	5	2	5	5	Ret	5	3	C	3	528 (Note: Repsol Honda Team raced with three bikes throughout the season, therefore their second best result of the races did not count towards the Teams' standings.)
1	Repsol Honda Team	7							8												528
1	Repsol Honda Team	26	3	2	1	Ret				8	1	3	**Ret**	2	2	2	1	4	**C**	5	528
1	Repsol Honda Team	27	**1**	**Ret**	3	**1**	1	**1**	2	**3**	**3**	1	1	**1**	**3**	**1**	**3**	**1**	C	**1**	528
2	Yamaha Factory Racing	1	2	1	**2**	4	2	Ret	6	1	2	**2**	4	4	1	3	2	DNS			446
2	Yamaha Factory Racing	11	6	Ret	Ret	6	3	Ret	1	4	5	4	5	3	6	5	6	DNS	C	2	446
2	Yamaha Factory Racing	89																	C	6	446
3	Ducati Team	46	7	5	5	3	5	6	4	6	9	6	6	10	7	10	Ret	Ret	C	Ret	271
3	Ducati Team	69	9	3	9	7	8	4	5	10	8	7	7	14	Ret	7	7	7	C	Ret	271
4	San Carlo Honda Gresini	7	10	4	7	8	Ret	9		11	15	10	9	9	11	11	9	Ret	C	12	232
4	San Carlo Honda Gresini	58	5	Ret	Ret	5	**6**	Ret	**9**	5	6	Ret	3	12	4	4	4	2	C^{†}		232
4	San Carlo Honda Gresini	64							13												232
5	Monster Yamaha Tech 3	5	8	Ret	6	13	DNS	3	7	9	10	8	8	7	13	13	8	5	C		188
5	Monster Yamaha Tech 3	35	11	8	8	Ret	7	DNS	14	Ret	14	Ret	Ret	11	10	9	11	Ret	C	4	188
5	Monster Yamaha Tech 3	41																		7	188
6	Pramac Racing Team	6															Ret				92
6	Pramac Racing Team	14	Ret	Ret	10	Ret	Ret	12	Ret	14	13	DNS	12	8	14	12	10	6	C	Ret	92
6	Pramac Racing Team	50									17										92
6	Pramac Racing Team	65	Ret	11	12	Ret	9	10	DNS			12	13	Ret	Ret	Ret		9	C	9	92
7	Maphre Aspar Team MotoGP	6																DNS			82
7	Maphre Aspar Team MotoGP	8	12	6	Ret	9	11	11	12	7	11	9	10	Ret	9	8	Ret		C	11	82
8	Rizla Suzuki MotoGP	19	DNS		13	12	12	5	11	13	7	Ret	Ret	6	8	6	Ret	Ret	C	Ret	73
8	Rizla Suzuki MotoGP	21		10																	73
9	Cardion AB Motoracing	17	13	7	Ret	10	10	7	Ret	12	12	11	Ret	Ret	12	Ret	DNS	10	C	8	64
10	LCR Honda MotoGP	24	Ret	9	11	11	13	8	10	15	16	13	11	13	15	Ret	Ret	8	C	10	61
Pos	Team	Bike No.	QAT	SPA	POR	FRA	CAT	GBR	NED	ITA	GER	USA	CZE	INP	RSM	ARA	JPN	AUS	MAL	VAL	Pts

- † – #58 Marco Simoncelli was fatally injured during the Malaysian Grand Prix and the race was abandoned as a result.

Footnotes

=== Moto2 standings ===
Scoring system

Points were awarded to the top fifteen finishers. Rider had to finish the race to earn points.

Position	**1st**	**2nd**	**3rd**	**4th**	**5th**	**6th**	**7th**	**8th**	**9th**	**10th**	**11th**	**12th**	**13th**	**14th**	**15th**
Points	25	20	16	13	11	10	9	8	7	6	5	4	3	2	1

==== Riders' standings ====
- Rounds marked with a light blue background were under wet race conditions or stopped by rain.
- Riders marked with light blue background were eligible for Rookie of the Year awards.

Pos	Rider	Bike	QAT	SPA	POR	FRA	CAT	GBR	NED	ITA	GER	CZE	INP	RSM	ARA	JPN	AUS	MAL	VAL	Pts
1	Stefan Bradl	Kalex	**1**	**5**	**1**	**3**	**1**	1	**Ret**	2	2	3	6	**2**	8	4	2	2	Ret	274
2	Marc Márquez	Suter	Ret	Ret	21	1	2	**Ret**	1	**1**	**1**	**2**	**1**	1	**1**	**2**	3	WD	WD	251
3	Andrea Iannone	Suter	2	1	13	Ret	15	16	12	5	14	1	11	3	2	1	8	9	11	177
4	Alex de Angelis	Motobi	4	7	12	10	6	Ret	5	4	3	4	15	4	4	6	**1**	4	12	174
5	Thomas Lüthi	Suter	3	2	Ret	5	Ret	15	8	6	5	5	17	8	7	3	11	**1**	17	151
6	Simone Corsi	FTR	6	3	5	7	4	10	14	7	8	9	14	10	3	5	15	Ret	Ret	127
7	Bradley Smith	Tech 3	9	4	29	9	19	2	3	3	Ret	Ret	4	6	6	7	18	WD	23	121
8	Dominique Aegerter	Suter	13	28	4	8	Ret	20	18	11	12	8	12	13	9	8	12	5	3	94
9	Michele Pirro	Moriwaki	8	9	22	14	12	3	17	Ret	10	18	20	14	Ret	13	14	7	**1**	84
10	Esteve Rabat	FTR	14	15	10	21	7	6	7	16	Ret	7	3	11	16	9	Ret	11	Ret	79
11	Yuki Takahashi	Moriwaki	5	Ret	3	2	Ret	7	Ret	14	Ret	12	25	7	31	30	10	Ret	Ret	77
12	Aleix Espargaró	Pons Kalex	11	24	Ret	6	3	18	16	9	Ret	6	10	Ret	5	31	13	8	21	76
13	Pol Espargaró	FTR	22	20	6	13	16	Ret	Ret	28	13	16	2	9	14	15	5	3	14	75
14	Julián Simón	Suter	10	6	2	4	Ret				Ret	DNS	7	12	17				10	68
15	Scott Redding	Suter	31	23	25	16	11	5	24	27	7	26	5	5	15	20	7	10	30	63
16	Mika Kallio	Suter	20	17	Ret	Ret	8	Ret	Ret	17	Ret	13	9	15	10	10	16	6	2	61
17	Kenan Sofuoğlu	Suter	18	16	Ret	26	Ret	8	2	10	11	10	DNS			19	6	12	20	59
18	Randy Krummenacher	Kalex	27	27	7	12	5	11	9	13	4	Ret	21	19	21	24	21	21	16	52
19	Yonny Hernández	FTR	12	14	18	20	9	9	13	Ret	6	Ret			DNS	23	24	DSQ	6	43
20	Max Neukirchner	MZ-RE Honda	15	10	DNS	15	10	12	10	8	Ret	Ret	24	Ret	13	18	Ret	Ret	9	42
21	Jules Cluzel	Suter	7	Ret	Ret	11	23	4	Ret	15	9	Ret	16	Ret	Ret	16	Ret	13	13	41
22	Anthony West	MZ-RE Honda	Ret	11	27	25	22	Ret	4	21	23	29	26	27	11	12	Ret	Ret	4	40
23	Mike Di Meglio	Tech 3	19	26	9	Ret	Ret	17	Ret	24	16	15	27	16	12	27	9	14	7	30
24	Mattia Pasini	FTR	Ret	13	20	23	Ret	Ret	6	20	19	11	8	17	Ret	14	Ret	Ret	Ret	28
25	Claudio Corti	Suter	21	21	11	22	17	Ret	15	23	15	14	22	18	19		4	Ret	15	23
26	Xavier Siméon	Tech 3	25	19	26	18	14	Ret	Ret	12	18	23	13	Ret	18	11	Ret	15	8	23
27	Alex Baldolini	Suter	28	Ret	8	Ret	13	14	11	Ret	17	Ret								18
27	Alex Baldolini	Pons Kalex											34	Ret	22					18
27	Alex Baldolini	Moriwaki																	19	18
28	Kenny Noyes	FTR	24	29	17	17	Ret	Ret	Ret	29	20	20	Ret	23	23	17	22	NC	5	11
29	Kev Coghlan	FTR	Ret	8	DNS	27	24	13	21											11
30	Ratthapark Wilairot	FTR	Ret	12	Ret	24	DNS	Ret	Ret	Ret	25	17	Ret	Ret	Ret	22	DNS		Ret	4
31	Ricard Cardús	Moriwaki	17	22	14	Ret	DNS		19	22	28	22	19	21	25	Ret	17	DNS		2
32	Axel Pons	Pons Kalex	16	Ret	15	Ret	Ret	Ret	Ret	DNS	22	24				Ret	19	NC	DNS	1
	Raffaele de Rosa	Moriwaki	30	25	16	19														0
	Raffaele de Rosa	FTR						21												0
	Raffaele de Rosa	Suter								Ret			23	22	Ret	Ret	20	Ret	Ret	0
	Joan Olivé	FTR												26	28	26	23	16	26	0
	Jordi Torres	Suter						Ret		19	21	19	18	DNS	20	Ret	Ret	17	18	0
	Javier Forés	Suter	26	18	19	29	Ret	19	23											0
	Valentin Debise	FTR	23	30	Ret	28	20	22	Ret	18	Ret	21	30	25	29	21	Ret	Ret	Ret	0
	Carmelo Morales	Moriwaki					18	Ret	20	25			Ret	Ret						0
	Carmelo Morales	Suter									DNS	Ret								0
	Mohamad Zamri Baba	Moriwaki																18		0
	Iván Moreno	Suter															25	19		0
	Tomoyoshi Koyama	Suter												20	24					0
	Tomoyoshi Koyama	TSR														28				0
	Hafizh Syahrin	Moriwaki																20		0
	Santiago Hernández	FTR	Ret	31	24	Ret	21		Ret	30	24	27	33	24	26	Ret	26	Ret	22	0
	Robertino Pietri	Suter	29	Ret	23	30	Ret	23	26	26	26	25	32	Ret	30	25	Ret	22	24	0
	Michael van der Mark	Ten Kate							22											0
	Mashel Al Naimi	Moriwaki	Ret	33	28	31	Ret	24	25	31	30	30	35	30	32	29	28	23	27	0
	Nasser Al Malki	Moriwaki	32					25											29	0
	Elena Rosell	Suter							DNQ						33				25	0
	Steven Odendaal	Suter		32	Ret	Ret			Ret		27	28								0
	Sergio Gadea	Moriwaki													27	DNS				0
	Blake Leigh-Smith	FTR															27			0
	Jacob Gagne	FTR											31	28						0
	Martín Cárdenas	FTR											28							0
	Óscar Climent	MIR Racing																	28	0
	Tommaso Lorenzetti	FTR								Ret	29	Ret								0
	J. D. Beach	FTR											29							0
	Alessandro Andreozzi	FTR												29						0
	Alex Cudlin	Moriwaki				32														0
	Łukasz Wargala	Moriwaki		Ret	DNQ															0
	Mattia Tarozzi	Suter								Ret										0
	Kris McLaren	Suter															Ret			0
	Apiwat Wongthananon	FTR																Ret		0
	Takaaki Nakagami	Suter														DNS				0
Pos	Rider	Bike	QAT	SPA	POR	FRA	CAT	GBR	NED	ITA	GER	CZE	INP	RSM	ARA	JPN	AUS	MAL	VAL	Pts

Colour	Result
Gold	Winner
Silver	2nd place
Bronze	3rd place
Green	Points finish
Blue	Non-points finish
Blue	Non-classified finish (NC)
Purple	Retired (Ret)
Red	Did not qualify (DNQ)
Red	Did not pre-qualify (DNPQ)
Black	Disqualified (DSQ)
White	Did not start (DNS)
White	Withdrew (WD)
White	Race cancelled (C)
Blank	Did not participate (DNP)
Blank	Excluded (EX)

**Bold** – Pole position
Italics – Fastest lap

==== Constructors' standings ====
- Each constructor got the same number of points as their best placed rider in each race.
- Rounds marked with a light blue background were under wet race conditions or stopped by rain.

Pos	Constructor	QAT	SPA	POR	FRA	CAT	GBR	NED	ITA	GER	CZE	INP	RSM	ARA	JPN	AUS	MAL	VAL	Pts
1	Suter	2	1	2	1	2	4	1	1	1	1	1	1	1	1	3	1	2	384
2	Kalex	1	5	1	3	1	1	9	2	2	3	6	2	8	4	2	2	16	281
3	FTR	6	3	5	7	4	6	6	7	6	7	2	9	3	5	5	3	5	199
4	Motobi	4	7	12	10	6	Ret	5	4	3	4	15	4	4	6	1	4	12	174
5	Tech 3	9	4	9	9	14	2	3	3	16	15	4	6	6	7	9	14	7	149
6	Moriwaki	5	9	3	2	12	3	17	14	10	12	19	7	25	13	10	7	1	138
7	Pons Kalex	11	24	15	6	3	18	16	9	22	6	10	Ret	5	31	13	8	21	77
8	MZ-RE Honda	15	10	27	15	10	12	4	8	23	29	24	27	11	12	Ret	Ret	4	61
	Ten Kate							22											0
	TSR														28				0
	MIR Racing																	28	0
Pos	Constructor	QAT	SPA	POR	FRA	CAT	GBR	NED	ITA	GER	CZE	INP	RSM	ARA	JPN	AUS	MAL	VAL	Pts

=== 125cc standings ===
Scoring system

Points were awarded to the top fifteen finishers. Rider had to finish the race to earn points.

Position	**1st**	**2nd**	**3rd**	**4th**	**5th**	**6th**	**7th**	**8th**	**9th**	**10th**	**11th**	**12th**	**13th**	**14th**	**15th**
Points	25	20	16	13	11	10	9	8	7	6	5	4	3	2	1

==== Riders' standings ====
- Rounds marked with a light blue background were under wet race conditions or stopped by rain.
- Riders marked with light blue background were eligible for Rookie of the Year awards.

Pos	Rider	Bike	QAT	SPA	POR	FRA	CAT	GBR	NED	ITA	GER	CZE	INP	RSM	ARA	JPN	AUS	MAL	VAL	Pts
1	Nicolás Terol	Aprilia	**1**	1	**1**	**2**	**1**	8	DNS	1	4	**Ret**	**1**	1	1	2	6	**5**	2	302
2	Johann Zarco	Derbi	6	3	3	5	6	2	5	**2**	2	2	5	**2**	2	**1**	**3**	3	Ret	262
3	Maverick Viñales	Aprilia	9	Ret	4	1	2	**Ret**	**1**	3	**3**	6	2	7	3	4	8	1	1	248
4	Sandro Cortese	Aprilia	2	**6**	2	7	4	7	4	12	8	1	3	4	7	5	1	2	Ret	225
5	Héctor Faubel	Aprilia	11	11	Ret	4	7	3	10	5	1	4	7	5	**Ret**	3	7	4	3	177
6	Jonas Folger	Aprilia	5	2	5	6	3	1	8	Ret	7		9	9	10	6	Ret	6	5	161
7	Efrén Vázquez	Derbi	4	9	6	3	5	5	7	4	Ret	Ret	6	3	4	Ret	4	11	4	160
8	Luis Salom	Aprilia	8	Ret	8	10	Ret	4	2	6	5	DNS		Ret	5	23	2	Ret	7	116
9	Sergio Gadea	Aprilia	3	Ret	12	8	8	Ret	3	7	6	5	4	8						103
10	Alberto Moncayo	Aprilia	7	16	Ret	11	15	17	15	9	11	3	DNS	11	8	7	5	9	6	94
11	Danny Kent	Aprilia	13	4	15	17	11	10	6	15	9	Ret	13	6	6	9	22	10	17	82
12	Jakub Kornfeil	Aprilia	23	7	13	21	10	9	16	10	13	7	10	12	13	11	13	8	24	72
13	Adrián Martín	Aprilia	28	12	9	14	9	6	33	Ret	Ret	Ret	Ret	26	9	8	27	Ret	NC	45
14	Miguel Oliveira	Aprilia	10	Ret	7	9	Ret			8	Ret	23	8	10	Ret					44
15	Marcel Schrötter	Mahindra	21	13	18	Ret	16	Ret	9	11	16	14	Ret	15	11	12	11	Ret	12	36
16	Simone Grotzkyj	Aprilia	14	17	10	12	25	Ret	12	13	17	8	11	DNS						32
17	Louis Rossi	Aprilia	15	14	Ret	13	12	13	30	Ret	18	15	12	Ret	Ret	DNS	9	18	10	31
18	Zulfahmi Khairuddin	Derbi	19	10	11	19	Ret	18	14	18	24	9	19	27	Ret	15	20	7	25	30
19	Danny Webb	Mahindra	16	Ret	16	Ret	Ret	11	13	Ret	14	12	DNS	21	15	Ret	10	13	**Ret**	24
20	Luigi Morciano	Aprilia	20	20	21	20	18	DNS	17	Ret	19	11	15	14	12	Ret	12	Ret	9	23
21	Niklas Ajo	Aprilia	17	Ret	14	Ret	13	16	Ret	22	10	Ret	Ret	DNS	Ret	Ret	Ret		8	19
22	Alexis Masbou	Aprilia				15														18
22	Alexis Masbou	KTM					14	14	11	16	26	Ret	14	20	Ret	Ret	14	12	22	18
23	Jasper Iwema	Aprilia	12	Ret	Ret	18	17	Ret	Ret	14	15	10	16	Ret	Ret	13	Ret	Ret	20	16
24	Taylor Mackenzie	Aprilia	18	5	DNS	22	28	12	26	17	Ret	21	21	22	Ret	Ret	18	21	Ret	15
25	Alessandro Tonucci	Aprilia	22	19	DNS	26	29	20	23	20	25	19	23	17	14	10	16	15	13	12
26	Hiroki Ono	KTM	Ret	8	17	16														8
27	Manuel Tatasciore	Aprilia										Ret		18	17		19	22	11	5
28	Harry Stafford	Aprilia	25	18	Ret	Ret	Ret	DNS	25	Ret	Ret	13	Ret	Ret	Ret	14	DNS	Ret	Ret	5
29	Toni Finsterbusch	KTM									12									4
30	Miroslav Popov	Aprilia								19		17		13						3
31	John McPhee	Aprilia					26	15											14	3
32	Josep Rodríguez	Aprilia		15			23		21						Ret	Ret	17	14	Ret	3
33	Giulian Pedone	Aprilia	26	Ret	19	23	21	Ret	19	23	20	24	24	23	18	19	25	17	15	1
34	Sturla Fagerhaug	Aprilia					19	Ret	31	Ret	21	16	Ret	Ret	16	18	15	19	16	1
	Jack Miller	Aprilia									Ret									0
	Jack Miller	KTM												24		16	23	16	Ret	0
	Kevin Calia	Aprilia								Ret				16						0
	Brad Binder	Aprilia											17			20	21	Ret	Ret	0
	Hikari Ookubo	Honda														17				0
	Luca Gruenwald	KTM							18		Ret	18								0
	Francesco Mauriello	Aprilia	27	Ret	Ret	24	20	Ret	24	21	22	20	18	Ret	Ret					0
	Peter Sebestyén	KTM			23	25	22	Ret	20	Ret	Ret	26	22							0
	Peter Sebestyén	Aprilia																	18	0
	Joan Perelló	Aprilia	Ret	23	20	Ret	27	19	27	Ret	23	22	20	25	Ret	22	Ret	Ret		0
	Daniel Ruiz	Honda		21															19	0
	Alessandro Giorgi	Aprilia												19						0
	Damien Raemy	KTM													19					0
	Pedro Rodríguez	Aprilia													20					0
	Arthur Sissis	Aprilia																20		0
	Marco Colandrea	Aprilia															24	23	21	0
	Syunya Mori	Aprilia														21				0
	Kevin Hanus	Honda		24	22		24								Ret				23	0
	Daniel Kartheininger	KTM	24	22																0
	Bryan Schouten	Honda							22											0
	Sarath Kumar	Aprilia	DNQ	DNQ	24															0
	Takehiro Yamamoto	Honda														24				0
	Farid Badrul	Derbi																24		0
	Ladislav Chmelik	Aprilia										25								0
	Luca Fabrizio	Aprilia														25				0
	Josh Hook	Aprilia															26			0
	Kevin Szalai	Aprilia				27														0
	Felix Forstenhäusler	Honda									27									0
	Kevin Thobois	Honda				28														0
	Thomas van Leeuwen	Honda							28											0
	Jerry van de Bunt	Honda							29											0
	Ernst Dubbink	Honda							32											0
	Massimo Parziani	Aprilia								Ret				Ret						0
	Marvin Fritz	Honda									Ret									0
	Hyuga Watanabe	Honda														Ret				0
	Nicky Diles	Aprilia															Ret			0
	Jun Ohnishi	Honda														DNS				0
	Juan Francisco Guevara	Aprilia																	DNS	0
	Jakub Jantulík	Honda										DNQ								0
	Avalon Biddle	Honda															DNQ			0
	Tom Hatton	Honda															DNQ			0
	Alex Phillis	Aprilia															DNQ			0
	Emil Petersen	Honda																	DNQ	0
Pos	Rider	Bike	QAT	SPA	POR	FRA	CAT	GBR	NED	ITA	GER	CZE	INP	RSM	ARA	JPN	AUS	MAL	VAL	Pts

Colour	Result
Gold	Winner
Silver	2nd place
Bronze	3rd place
Green	Points finish
Blue	Non-points finish
Blue	Non-classified finish (NC)
Purple	Retired (Ret)
Red	Did not qualify (DNQ)
Red	Did not pre-qualify (DNPQ)
Black	Disqualified (DSQ)
White	Did not start (DNS)
White	Withdrew (WD)
White	Race cancelled (C)
Blank	Did not participate (DNP)
Blank	Excluded (EX)

**Bold** – Pole position
Italics – Fastest lap

==== Constructors' standings ====
- Each constructor got the same number of points as their best placed rider in each race.
- Rounds marked with a light blue background were under wet race conditions or stopped by rain.

Pos	Constructor	QAT	SPA	POR	FRA	CAT	GBR	NED	ITA	GER	CZE	INP	RSM	ARA	JPN	AUS	MAL	VAL	Pts
1	Aprilia	1	1	1	1	1	1	1	1	1	1	1	1	1	2	1	1	1	420
2	Derbi	4	3	3	3	5	2	5	2	2	2	5	2	2	1	3	3	4	284
3	Mahindra	16	13	16	Ret	16	11	9	11	14	12	Ret	15	11	12	10	13	12	49
4	KTM	24	8	17	16	14	14	11	16	12	18	14	20	19	16	14	12	22	29
	Honda		21	22	28	24		22		27	DNQ			Ret	17	DNQ		19	0
Pos	Constructor	QAT	SPA	POR	FRA	CAT	GBR	NED	ITA	GER	CZE	INP	RSM	ARA	JPN	AUS	MAL	VAL	Pts
