= Jun Ohnishi =

Japanese motorcycle racer

- Nationality: Japanese
- Born: (Japan)

Jun Ohnishi is a Grand Prix motorcycle racer from Japan.

== Career statistics ==
=== By season ===
Season	Class	Motorcycle	Team	Number	Race	Win	Podium	Pole	FLap	Pts	Plcd
2011	125cc	Honda	Project u 7C Harc	80	0	0	0	0	0	0	NC
Total					0	0	0	0	0	0	

=== Races by year ===
(key)

Yr	Class	Bike	1	2	3	4	5	6	7	8	9	10	11	12	13	14	15	16	17	Pos	Pts
2011	125cc	Aprilia	QAT	SPA	POR	FRA	CAT	GBR	NED	ITA	GER	CZE	INP	RSM	ARA	JPN; DNS	AUS	MAL	VAL	NC	0
