= Kévin Thobois =

French motorcycle racer

- Nationality: French
- Born: 20 February 1992 (age 34); Izier, France
- Bike number: -

Kévin Thobois (born 20 February 1992 in Izier) is a French Grand Prix motorcycle racer.

== Career statistics ==
=== By season ===
Season	Class	Motorcycle	Team	Number	Race	Win	Podium	Pole	FLap	Pts	Plcd
2011	125cc	Honda	Team RMS	92	1	0	0	0	0	0	NC
Total					1	0	0	0	0	0	

=== Races by year ===
(key)

Yr	Class	Bike	1	2	3	4	5	6	7	8	9	10	11	12	13	14	15	16	17	Pos	Pts
2011	125cc	Honda	QAT	SPA	POR	FRA; 28	CAT	GBR	NED	ITA	GER	CZE	INP	RSM	ARA	JPN	AUS	MAL	VAL	NC	0
