= Emil Petersen =

Danish motorcycle racer

- Nationality: Danish
- Born: Denmark
Motorcycle racing career statistics
125cc World Championship
Active years	2011
Manufacturers	Honda
Championships	0
2011 championship position	NC (0 pts)
Starts / Wins / Podiums / Poles / F. laps / Points; 0 / 0 / 0 / 0 / 0 / 0

Emil Petersen is a Danish motorcycle racer.

== Career ==
Petersen competed in the 2010 Open Swedish Road Racing Championship and the Open Scandinavian Championship that same year. In 2011, he participated for the first time in a 125cc World Championship event as a wild-card rider in the season finale at Valencia, but failed to qualify for the race.

== Career statistics ==
=== Grand Prix motorcycle racing ===
==== By season ====
Season	Class	Motorcycle	Team	Number	Race	Win	Podium	Pole	FLap	Pts	Plcd
2011	125cc	Honda	Nordgren Racing	22	0	0	0	0	0	0	NC
Total					0	0	0	0	0	0	

=== Races by year ===
(key)

Yr	Class	Bike	1	2	3	4	5	6	7	8	9	10	11	12	13	14	15	16	17	Pos	Pts
2011	125cc	Honda	QAT	SPA	POR	FRA	CAT	GBR	NED	ITA	GER	CZE	INP	RSM	ARA	JPN	AUS	MAL	VAL; DNQ	NC	0
