= 2012 Moto2 World Championship =

3rd running of the Moto2 World Championship

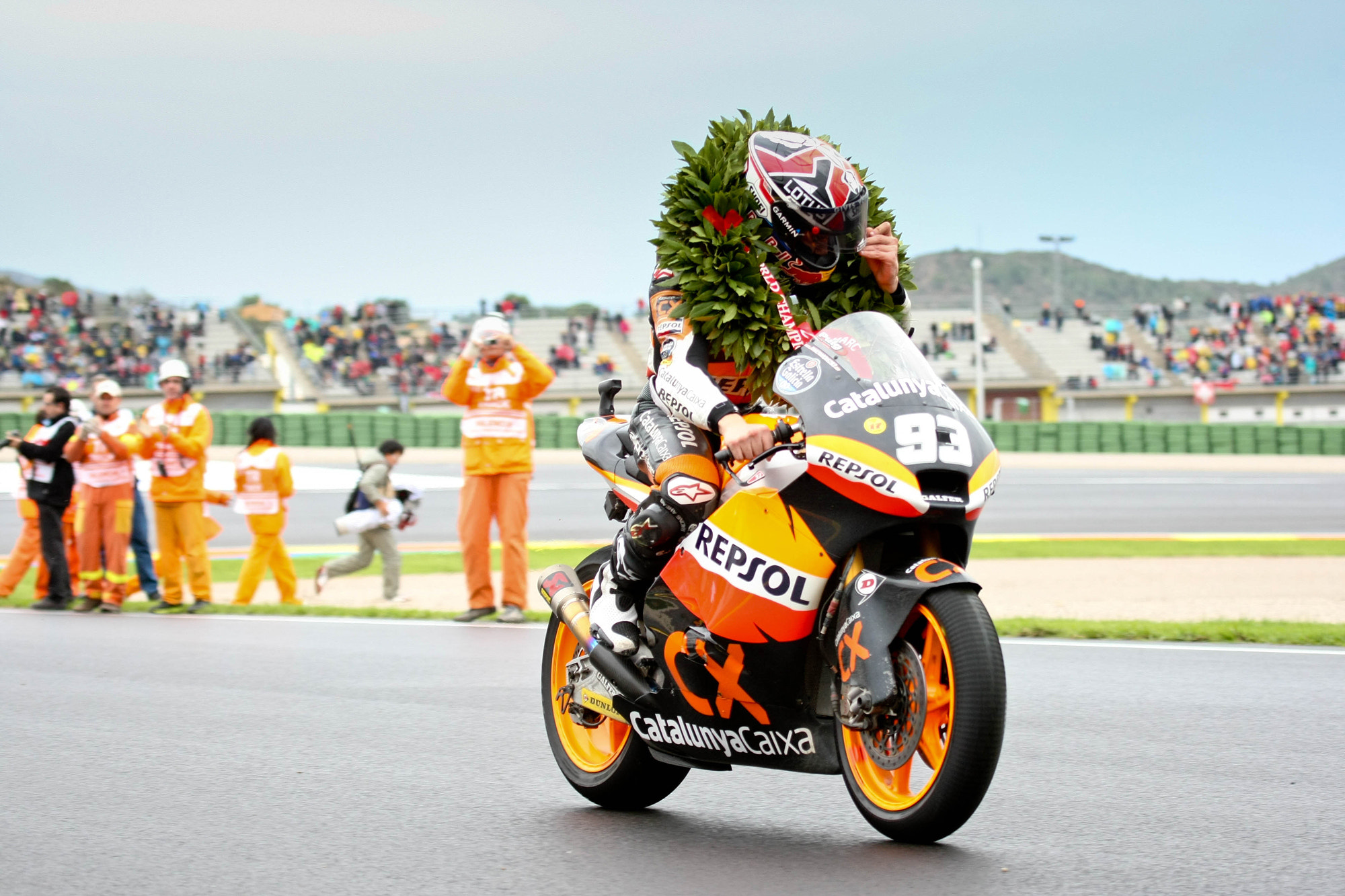
Marc Márquez was the 2012 Moto2 World Riders' Champion.

The 2012 FIM Moto2 World Championship was the intermediate class of the 64th Fédération Internationale de Motocyclisme (FIM) Road Racing World Championship season.

Stefan Bradl was the reigning champion, but did not contest in season as he joined MotoGP with LCR Honda.

== Season summary ==
Marc Márquez won the Moto2 championship title after a season-long battle with fellow Spanish rider Pol Espargaró; a second-place finish for Márquez at the Australian Grand Prix – despite a win for Espargaró – was enough to give him his second world title before moving into the premier class for the 2013 season. He took his last victory in the class at the Valencian Grand Prix, the last event of the season, despite starting from 33rd on the grid. This performance, which included overtaking 20 bikes on the first lap alone, meant the biggest comeback in the sport's history. Márquez's result was enough to give Suter the constructors' title for the class.

== Calendar ==
The following Grands Prix were scheduled to take place in 2012:

The Fédération Internationale de Motocyclisme released an 17-race provisional calendar on 14 September 2011. Another provisional calendar was released three months later, with the Qatar Grand Prix moved forward by a week.

Round	Date	Grand Prix	Circuit
1	8 April ‡	Commercialbank Grand Prix of Qatar	Lusail International Circuit, Lusail
2	29 April	(Spain) Gran Premio bwin de España	Circuito de Jerez, Jerez de la Frontera
3	6 May	Grande Prémio de Portugal Circuito Estoril	Circuito do Estoril, Estoril
4	20 May	Monster Energy Grand Prix de France	Bugatti Circuit, Le Mans
5	3 June	(Catalonia) Gran Premi Aperol de Catalunya	Circuit de Barcelona-Catalunya, Montmeló
6	17 June	(United Kingdom) Hertz British Grand Prix	Silverstone Circuit, Silverstone
7	30 June ††	(Netherlands) Iveco TT Assen	TT Circuit Assen, Assen
8	8 July	(Germany) eni Motorrad Grand Prix Deutschland	Sachsenring, Hohenstein-Ernstthal
9	15 July	(Italy) Gran Premio d'Italia TIM	Mugello Circuit, Scarperia e San Piero
10	19 August	Red Bull Indianapolis Grand Prix	Indianapolis Motor Speedway, Speedway
11	26 August	(Czech Republic) bwin Grand Prix České republiky	Brno Circuit, Brno
12	16 September	Gran Premio Aperol di San Marino e Della Riviera di Rimini	Misano World Circuit, Misano Adriatico
13	30 September	(Aragon) Gran Premio Iveco de Aragón	MotorLand Aragón, Alcañiz
14	14 October	AirAsia Grand Prix of Japan	Motegi Circuit, Motegi
15	21 October	(Malaysia) Malaysian Motorcycle Grand Prix	Sepang International Circuit, Sepang
16	28 October	(Australia) AirAsia Australian Grand Prix	Phillip Island Grand Prix Circuit, Phillip Island
17	11 November	(Valencian Community) Gran Premio Generali de la Comunitat Valenciana	Circuit Ricardo Tormo, Valencia

‡ = Night race
†† = Saturday race

=== Calendar changes ===
- The Czech Republic and Indianapolis Grand Prix swapped places.

== Teams and riders ==
- A provisional entry list was released by the Fédération Internationale de Motocyclisme on 13 January 2012. All Moto2 competitors raced with an identical CBR600RR inline-four engine developed by Honda. Teams competed with tyres supplied by Dunlop.

Team	Constructor	Motorcycle	No.	Rider	Rounds
(Italy) Came IodaRacing Project	FTR	FTR Moto M212	3	(Italy) Simone Corsi	All
GP Team Switzerland	Kalex	Kalex Moto2	4	(Switzerland) Randy Krummenacher	1–12, 16–17
GP Team Switzerland	Kalex	Kalex Moto2	20	(Switzerland) Jesko Raffin	13–15
(Monaco) JiR Moto2	Motobi	TSR TSR6	5	(France) Johann Zarco	All
(Monaco) JiR Moto2	Motobi	TSR TSR6	57	(Brazil) Eric Granado ^{1}	6–11, 13–17
(Germany) Cresto Guide MZ Racing (Germany) MZ Racing	MZ FTR	FTR Moto M212	7	(Sweden) Alexander Lundh	1
(Germany) Cresto Guide MZ Racing (Germany) MZ Racing	MZ-RE Honda	MZ Moto2	7	(Sweden) Alexander Lundh	2–7
(Germany) Cresto Guide MZ Racing (Germany) MZ Racing	MZ-RE Honda	MZ Moto2	21	(Germany) Markus Reiterberger	8
(Germany) Cresto Guide MZ Racing (Germany) MZ Racing	MZ-RE Honda	MZ Moto2	63	(France) Mike Di Meglio	9–11
(Italy) Federal Oil Gresini Moto2 (Italy) Thai Honda Gresini Moto2	Moriwaki	Moriwaki MD600	8	(United Kingdom) Gino Rea	1–3
(Italy) Federal Oil Gresini Moto2 (Italy) Thai Honda Gresini Moto2	Moriwaki	Moriwaki MD600	14	(Thailand) Ratthapark Wilairot	1–3
(Italy) Federal Oil Gresini Moto2 (Italy) Thai Honda Gresini Moto2	Suter	Suter MMX2	8	(United Kingdom) Gino Rea	4–17
(Italy) Federal Oil Gresini Moto2 (Italy) Thai Honda Gresini Moto2	Suter	Suter MMX2	14	(Thailand) Ratthapark Wilairot	4–17
(Spain) SAG Team (Spain) Desguaces La Torre SAG	FTR	FTR Moto M212	10	(Switzerland) Marco Colandrea	1–13, 15–16
(Spain) SAG Team (Spain) Desguaces La Torre SAG	FTR	FTR Moto M212	28	(Spain) Román Ramos	17
(Spain) SAG Team (Spain) Desguaces La Torre SAG	FTR	FTR Moto M212	31	(Japan) Kohta Nozane	14
(Spain) SAG Team (Spain) Desguaces La Torre SAG	FTR	FTR Moto M212	47	(Spain) Ángel Rodríguez	1–3
(Spain) SAG Team (Spain) Desguaces La Torre SAG	Bimota	Bimota HB4	47	(Spain) Ángel Rodríguez	4–6
(Spain) SAG Team (Spain) Desguaces La Torre SAG	Bimota	Bimota HB4	23	(Germany) Marcel Schrötter	10–17
(Spain) SAG Team (Spain) Desguaces La Torre SAG	Bimota	Bimota HB4	50	(Australia) Damian Cudlin	7–8
(Spain) SAG Team (Spain) Desguaces La Torre SAG	Bimota	Bimota HB4	55	(Italy) Massimo Roccoli	9
(Germany) Kiefer Racing	IAMT	IAMT Moto2	11	(Germany) Kevin Wahr	8
(Germany) Kiefer Racing	Kalex	Kalex Moto2	63	(France) Mike Di Meglio	12–17
(Germany) Kiefer Racing	Kalex	Kalex Moto2	76	(Germany) Max Neukirchner	1–11
(Switzerland) Interwetten-Paddock	Suter	Suter MMX2	12	(Switzerland) Thomas Lüthi	All
(Switzerland) NGM Mobile Forward Racing	Suter	Suter MMX2	15	(San Marino) Alex de Angelis	1–6
(Switzerland) NGM Mobile Forward Racing	Suter	Suter MMX2	72	(Japan) Yuki Takahashi	1–6
(Switzerland) NGM Mobile Forward Racing	FTR	FTR Moto M212	15	(San Marino) Alex de Angelis	7–16
(Switzerland) NGM Mobile Forward Racing	FTR	FTR Moto M212	54	(Italy) Mattia Pasini	17
(Switzerland) NGM Mobile Forward Racing	FTR	FTR Moto M212	72	(Japan) Yuki Takahashi	7–17
(Spain) TSR Galicia School	Kalex	Kalex Moto2	17	(Spain) Dani Rivas	17
(Spain) Mapfre Aspar Team Moto2	Suter	Suter MMX2	18	(Spain) Nicolás Terol	All
(Spain) Mapfre Aspar Team Moto2	Suter	Suter MMX2	24	(Spain) Toni Elías	1–9
(Spain) Mapfre Aspar Team Moto2	Suter	Suter MMX2	81	(Spain) Jordi Torres	10–17
(France) Tech 3 Racing	Tech 3	Tech 3 Mistral 610	19	(Belgium) Xavier Siméon	1–4, 6–17
(France) Tech 3 Racing	Tech 3	Tech 3 Mistral 610	38	(United Kingdom) Bradley Smith	All
(France) Tech 3 Racing	Tech 3	Tech 3 Mistral 610	81	(Spain) Jordi Torres	5
(Italy) Andreozzi Reparto Corse	FTR	FTR Moto M210	22	(Italy) Alessandro Andreozzi	6
(Italy) Speed Master (Italy) S/Master Speed Up	Speed Up	Speed Up S12	22	(Italy) Alessandro Andreozzi	8–17
(Italy) Speed Master (Italy) S/Master Speed Up	Speed Up	Speed Up S12	29	(Italy) Andrea Iannone	All
(Italy) Speed Master (Italy) S/Master Speed Up	Speed Up	Speed Up S12	63	(France) Mike Di Meglio	1–7
(Italy) Italtrans Racing Team	Kalex	Kalex Moto2	24	(Spain) Toni Elías	14–17
(Italy) Italtrans Racing Team	Kalex	Kalex Moto2	30	(Japan) Takaaki Nakagami	All
(Italy) Italtrans Racing Team	Kalex	Kalex Moto2	71	(Italy) Claudio Corti	1–13
(Belgium) Marc VDS Racing Team	Kalex	Kalex Moto2	36	(Finland) Mika Kallio	All
(Belgium) Marc VDS Racing Team	Kalex	Kalex Moto2	45	(United Kingdom) Scott Redding	All
(Spain) Pons 40 HP Tuenti (Spain) Tuenti Móvil HP 40	Kalex	Kalex Moto2	40	(Spain) Pol Espargaró	All
(Spain) Pons 40 HP Tuenti (Spain) Tuenti Móvil HP 40	Kalex	Kalex Moto2	49	(Spain) Axel Pons	All
(Spain) Pons 40 HP Tuenti (Spain) Tuenti Móvil HP 40	Kalex	Kalex Moto2	80	(Spain) Esteve Rabat	All
(France) Technomag-CIP	Suter	Suter MMX2	44	(Italy) Roberto Rolfo	1–11
(France) Technomag-CIP	Suter	Suter MMX2	75	(Japan) Tomoyoshi Koyama	12–17
(France) Technomag-CIP	Suter	Suter MMX2	77	(Switzerland) Dominique Aegerter	All
(Spain) Blusens Avintia	FTR	FTR Moto M212	60	(Spain) Julián Simón	1
(Spain) Blusens Avintia	Suter	Suter MMX2	60	(Spain) Julián Simón	2–17
(Qatar) QMMF Racing Team (Qatar) Evalube QMMF Racing	Moriwaki	Moriwaki MD600	82	(Spain) Elena Rosell	1–10
(Qatar) QMMF Racing Team (Qatar) Evalube QMMF Racing	Moriwaki	Moriwaki MD600	95	(Australia) Anthony West	1–8
(Qatar) QMMF Racing Team (Qatar) Evalube QMMF Racing	Moriwaki	Moriwaki MD600	96	(Qatar) Nasser Al Malki	1
(Qatar) QMMF Racing Team (Qatar) Evalube QMMF Racing	Speed Up	Speed Up S12	82	(Spain) Elena Rosell	11–17
(Qatar) QMMF Racing Team (Qatar) Evalube QMMF Racing	Speed Up	Speed Up S12	95	(Australia) Anthony West	9–16
(Qatar) QMMF Racing Team (Qatar) Evalube QMMF Racing	Speed Up	Speed Up S12	97	(Indonesia) Rafid Topan Sucipto	17
(Spain) Arguiñano Racing Team	AJR	AJR EVO 2012	84	(South Africa) Steven Odendaal	12–13
(Spain) Arguiñano Racing Team	AJR	AJR EVO 2012	88	(Spain) Ricard Cardús	1–11, 14–17
Petronas Raceline Malaysia	FTR	FTR Moto M212	86	(Malaysia) Hafizh Syahrin	15
(Spain) Targo Bank CNS Motorsport	Suter	Suter MMX2	92	(Spain) Álex Mariñelarena	13
(Spain) Team CatalunyaCaixa Repsol	Suter	Suter MMX2	93	(Spain) Marc Márquez	All

Key
Regular Rider
Wildcard Rider
Replacement Rider

Notes:

- ^1 — Eric Granado only completed from the British Grand Prix onwards, after he reached the age of 16 which is the minimum age to compete in the championship.

== Results and standings ==
=== Grands Prix ===
Round	Grand Prix	Pole position	Fastest lap	Winning rider	Winning team	Winning constructor	Report
1	Qatar motorcycle Grand Prix	(Switzerland) Thomas Lüthi	(Spain) Marc Márquez	(Spain) Marc Márquez	(Spain) Team CatalunyaCaixa Repsol	(Switzerland) Suter	Report
2	(Spain) Spanish motorcycle Grand Prix	(Spain) Marc Márquez	(Switzerland) Randy Krummenacher	(Spain) Pol Espargaró	(Spain) Pons 40 HP Tuenti	(Germany) Kalex	Report
3	(Portugal) Portuguese motorcycle Grand Prix	(Spain) Marc Márquez	(Spain) Pol Espargaró	(Spain) Marc Márquez	(Spain) Team CatalunyaCaixa Repsol	(Switzerland) Suter	Report
4	(France) French motorcycle Grand Prix	(Spain) Marc Márquez	(Italy) Claudio Corti	(Switzerland) Thomas Lüthi	(Switzerland) Interwetten-Paddock	(Switzerland) Suter	Report
5	(Catalonia) Catalan motorcycle Grand Prix	(Spain) Marc Márquez	(Switzerland) Thomas Lüthi	(Italy) Andrea Iannone	(Italy) Speed Master	(Italy) Speed Up	Report
6	(United Kingdom) British motorcycle Grand Prix	(Spain) Pol Espargaró	(Switzerland) Thomas Lüthi	(Spain) Pol Espargaró	(Spain) Pons 40 HP Tuenti	(Germany) Kalex	Report
7	(Netherlands) Dutch TT	(Spain) Marc Márquez	(Spain) Marc Márquez	(Spain) Marc Márquez	(Spain) Team CatalunyaCaixa Repsol	(Switzerland) Suter	Report
8	(Germany) German motorcycle Grand Prix	(Spain) Marc Márquez	(San Marino) Alex de Angelis	(Spain) Marc Márquez	(Spain) Team CatalunyaCaixa Repsol	(Switzerland) Suter	Report
9	(Italy) Italian motorcycle Grand Prix	(Spain) Pol Espargaró	(Switzerland) Thomas Lüthi	(Italy) Andrea Iannone	(Italy) Speed Master	(Italy) Speed Up	Report
10	Indianapolis motorcycle Grand Prix	(Spain) Marc Márquez	(Spain) Pol Espargaró	(Spain) Marc Márquez	(Spain) Team CatalunyaCaixa Repsol	(Switzerland) Suter	Report
11	Czech Republic motorcycle Grand Prix	(Spain) Pol Espargaró	(Spain) Pol Espargaró	(Spain) Marc Márquez	(Spain) Team CatalunyaCaixa Repsol	(Switzerland) Suter	Report
12	San Marino and Rimini Riviera motorcycle Grand Prix	(Spain) Marc Márquez	(Spain) Marc Márquez	(Spain) Marc Márquez	(Spain) Team CatalunyaCaixa Repsol	(Switzerland) Suter	Report
13	Aragon motorcycle Grand Prix	(Italy) Simone Corsi	(Spain) Pol Espargaró	(Spain) Pol Espargaró	(Spain) Pons 40 HP Tuenti	(Germany) Kalex	Report
14	(Japan) Japanese motorcycle Grand Prix	(Spain) Pol Espargaró	(Spain) Pol Espargaró	(Spain) Marc Márquez	(Spain) Team CatalunyaCaixa Repsol	(Switzerland) Suter	Report
15	(Malaysia) Malaysian motorcycle Grand Prix	(Spain) Pol Espargaró	(Malaysia) Hafizh Syahrin	(San Marino) Alex de Angelis	(Switzerland) NGM Mobile Forward Racing	(United Kingdom) FTR	Report
16	(Australia) Australian motorcycle Grand Prix	(Spain) Pol Espargaró	(Spain) Pol Espargaró	(Spain) Pol Espargaró	(Spain) Pons 40 HP Tuenti	(Germany) Kalex	Report
17	Valencian Community motorcycle Grand Prix	(Spain) Pol Espargaró	(Spain) Marc Márquez	(Spain) Marc Márquez	(Spain) Team CatalunyaCaixa Repsol	(Switzerland) Suter	Report

=== Riders' standings ===
Scoring system

Points were awarded to the top fifteen finishers. A rider had to finish the race to earn points.

Position	**1st**	**2nd**	**3rd**	**4th**	**5th**	**6th**	**7th**	**8th**	**9th**	**10th**	**11th**	**12th**	**13th**	**14th**	**15th**
Points	25	20	16	13	11	10	9	8	7	6	5	4	3	2	1

Pos	Rider	Bike	QAT (Qatar)	SPA (Spain)	POR (Portugal)	FRA (France)	CAT (Catalonia)	GBR (United Kingdom)	NED (Netherlands)	GER (Germany)	ITA (Italy)	INP (Indianapolis)	CZE (Czech Republic)	RSM (San Marino)	ARA (Aragon)	JPN (Japan)	MAL (Malaysia)	AUS (Australia)	VAL (Valencian Community)	Pts
1	(Spain) Marc Márquez	Suter	1	**2**	**1**	**Ret**	**3**	3	**1**	**1**	5	1	1	**1**	2	1	Ret	2	1	328
2	(Spain) Pol Espargaró	Kalex	3	1	2	6	Ret	**1**	Ret	4	**2**	**2**	**3**	2	1	**2**	**10**	**1**	**8**	269
3	(Italy) Andrea Iannone	Speed Up	2	14	5	4	1	4	2	16	1	9	4	3	4	17	5	Ret	11	194
4	(Switzerland) Thomas Lüthi	Suter	**5**	3	3	1	2	8	Ret	5	3	5	2	9	10	5	Ret	Ret	4	191
5	(United Kingdom) Scott Redding	Kalex	6	4	11	3	10	2	3	Ret	6	6	Ret	7	3	4	11	3	22	165
6	(Finland) Mika Kallio	Kalex	10	7	9	5	9	10	10	2	11	4	9	4	15	16	6	Ret	7	130
7	(Spain) Esteve Rabat	Kalex	4	28	24	10	4	13	4	12	Ret	11	10	5	11	3	9	7	10	117
8	(Switzerland) Dominique Aegerter	Suter	18	8	12	14	7	9	7	10	8	7	14	6	14	10	8	4	5	114
9	(United Kingdom) Bradley Smith	Tech 3	9	11	10	9	12	7	6	7	4	15	8	8	5	Ret	7	11	16	112
10	(France) Johann Zarco	Motobi	12	10	4	Ret	11	Ret	8	11	10	12	7	10	6	8	Ret	5	Ret	95
11	(Italy) Simone Corsi	FTR	8	17	Ret	Ret	5	5	Ret	6	18	8	5	Ret	**7**	6	22	6	17	88
12	(San Marino) Alex de Angelis	Suter	Ret	12	6	Ret	14	11												86
12	(San Marino) Alex de Angelis	FTR							5	3	Ret	Ret	6	13	Ret	19	1	DNS		86
13	(Spain) Julián Simón	FTR	15																	81
13	(Spain) Julián Simón	Suter		23	8	12	Ret	22	14	15	14	3	11	12	17	11	4	Ret	2	81
14	(Italy) Claudio Corti	Kalex	16	6	14	2	13	6	16	9	9	10	Ret	14	9					74
15	(Japan) Takaaki Nakagami	Kalex	14	5	18	Ret	6	19	12	19	7	16	17	11	29	7	Ret	9	Ret	57
16	(Spain) Toni Elías	Suter	13	9	7	11	Ret	12	9	Ret	Ret									50
16	(Spain) Toni Elías	Kalex														Ret	12	12	9	50
17	(Spain) Nicolás Terol	Suter	23	27	16	13	15	20	17	14	13	13	12	15	12	18	Ret	17	3	37
18	(Switzerland) Randy Krummenacher	Kalex	11	22	19	Ret	8	14	11	24	12	17	21	DNS				8	19	32
19	(Spain) Jordi Torres	Tech 3					16													31
19	(Spain) Jordi Torres	Suter										18	13	16	8	12	Ret	10	6	31
20	(United Kingdom) Gino Rea	Moriwaki	26	15	28															25
20	(United Kingdom) Gino Rea	Suter				Ret	Ret	24	21	17	19	19	23	Ret	21	24	2	20	12	25
21	(Belgium) Xavier Siméon	Tech 3	17	13	13	DNS		21	13	8	Ret	Ret	Ret	Ret	Ret	13	Ret	13	27	23
22	(France) Mike Di Meglio	Speed Up	7	Ret	Ret	Ret	Ret	18	15											17
22	(France) Mike Di Meglio	MZ-RE Honda									22	24	16							17
22	(France) Mike Di Meglio	Kalex												18	13	14	Ret	14	28	17
23	(Malaysia) Hafizh Syahrin	FTR															3			16
24	(Spain) Axel Pons	Kalex	22	18	Ret	16	22	Ret	Ret	Ret	Ret	21	15	17	16	9	13	Ret	20	11
25	(Spain) Ricard Cardús	AJR	24	19	15	Ret	19	23	18	13	15	14	DNS			21	14	16	15	10
26	(Germany) Max Neukirchner	Kalex	30	Ret	20	7	17	17	Ret	18	Ret	21	DNS							9
27	(Thailand) Ratthapark Wilairot	Moriwaki	21	26	23															9
27	(Thailand) Ratthapark Wilairot	Suter				8	18	15	Ret	Ret	16	23	20	19	24	20	21	18	24	9
28	(Japan) Yuki Takahashi	Suter	19	21	Ret	17	21	25												5
28	(Japan) Yuki Takahashi	FTR							20	Ret	17	27	18	Ret	22	15	15	15	14	5
29	(Spain) Dani Rivas	Kalex																	13	3
30	(Italy) Roberto Rolfo	Suter	Ret	25	21	15	Ret	16	19	20	Ret	Ret	19							1
	(Japan) Tomoyoshi Koyama	Suter												20	23	22	16	21	18	0
	(Australia) Anthony West	Moriwaki	25	16	17	DSQ	DSQ	DSQ	DSQ	DSQ										0
	(Australia) Anthony West	Speed Up									DSQ	DSQ	DSQ	DSQ	DSQ	DSQ	DSQ	DSQ		0
	(Germany) Marcel Schrötter	Bimota										22	22	21	19	23	17	19	21	0
	(Spain) Álex Mariñelarena	Suter													18					0
	(Switzerland) Marco Colandrea	FTR	27	Ret	27	18	24	28	22	22	20	26	Ret	23	28		20	24		0
	(Switzerland) Jesko Raffin	Kalex													27	28	18			0
	(Spain) Elena Rosell	Moriwaki	29	Ret	26	Ret	25	30	24	Ret	Ret	Ret								0
	(Spain) Elena Rosell	Speed Up											26	Ret	26	26	19	23	Ret	0
	(Spain) Ángel Rodríguez	FTR	20	20	22															0
	(Spain) Ángel Rodríguez	Bimota				Ret	20	26												0
	(South Africa) Steven Odendaal	AJR												Ret	20					0
	(Brazil) Eric Granado	Motobi						31	23	26	21	25	25		25	27	Ret	Ret	29	0
	(Australia) Damian Cudlin	Bimota							Ret	21										0
	(Italy) Alessandro Andreozzi	FTR						29												0
	(Italy) Alessandro Andreozzi	Speed Up								Ret	Ret	Ret	24	22	30	25	DSQ	22	23	0
	(Sweden) Alexander Lundh	MZ FTR	28																	0
	(Sweden) Alexander Lundh	MZ-RE Honda		24	25	Ret	23	27	Ret											0
	(Germany) Kevin Wahr	IAMT								23										0
	(Italy) Mattia Pasini	FTR																	25	0
	(Germany) Markus Reiterberger	MZ-RE Honda								25										0
	(Spain) Román Ramos	FTR																	26	0
	(Indonesia) Rafid Topan Sucipto	Speed Up																	30	0
	(Italy) Massimo Roccoli	Bimota									Ret									0
	(Qatar) Nasser Al Malki	Moriwaki	Ret																	0
	(Japan) Kohta Nozane	FTR														DSQ				0
Pos	Rider	Bike	QAT (Qatar)	SPA (Spain)	POR (Portugal)	FRA (France)	CAT (Catalonia)	GBR (United Kingdom)	NED (Netherlands)	GER (Germany)	ITA (Italy)	INP (Indianapolis)	CZE (Czech Republic)	RSM (San Marino)	ARA (Aragon)	JPN (Japan)	MAL (Malaysia)	AUS (Australia)	VAL (Valencian Community)	Pts

Colour	Result
Gold	Winner
Silver	Second place
Bronze	Third place
Green	Points classification
Blue	Non-points classification
Blue	Non-classified finish (NC)
Purple	Retired, not classified (Ret)
Red	Did not qualify (DNQ)
Red	Did not pre-qualify (DNPQ)
Black	Disqualified (DSQ)
White	Did not start (DNS)
White	Withdrew (WD)
White	Race cancelled (C)
Blank	Did not practice (DNP)
Blank	Did not arrive (DNA)
Blank	Excluded (EX)

**Bold** – Pole
Italics – Fastest Lap
Light blue – Rookie

=== Constructors' standings ===
Each constructor received the same number of points as their best placed rider in each race.

Pos	Constructor	QAT (Qatar)	SPA (Spain)	POR (Portugal)	FRA (France)	CAT (Catalonia)	GBR (United Kingdom)	NED (Netherlands)	GER (Germany)	ITA (Italy)	INP (Indianapolis)	CZE (Czech Republic)	RSM (San Marino)	ARA (Aragon)	JPN (Japan)	MAL (Malaysia)	AUS (Australia)	VAL (Valencian Community)	Pts
1	(Switzerland) Suter	1	2	1	1	2	3	1	1	3	1	1	1	2	1	2	2	1	382
2	(Germany) Kalex	3	1	2	2	4	1	3	2	2	2	3	2	1	2	6	1	7	320
3	(Italy) Speed Up	2	14	5	4	1	4	2	16	1	9	4	3	4	17	5	22	11	194
4	(United Kingdom) FTR	8	17	22	18	5	5	5	3	17	8	5	13	7	6	1	6	14	135
5	(France) Tech 3	9	11	10	9	12	7	6	7	4	15	8	8	5	13	7	11	16	115
6	(Italy) Motobi	12	10	4	Ret	11	31	8	11	10	12	7	10	6	8	Ret	5	29	95
7	(Spain) AJR	24	19	15	Ret	19	23	18	13	15	14	DNS	Ret	20	21	14	16	15	10
8	(Japan) Moriwaki	21	15	17	Ret	26	30	24	Ret	Ret	Ret								1
	(Germany) MZ-RE Honda		24	25	Ret	23	27	Ret	25	22	24	16							0
	(Italy) Bimota				Ret	20	26	Ret	21	Ret	22	22	21	19	23	17	19	21	0
	(Germany) IAMT								23										0
	(Germany) MZ FTR	28																	0
Pos	Constructor	QAT (Qatar)	SPA (Spain)	POR (Portugal)	FRA (France)	CAT (Catalonia)	GBR (United Kingdom)	NED (Netherlands)	GER (Germany)	ITA (Italy)	INP (Indianapolis)	CZE (Czech Republic)	RSM (San Marino)	ARA (Aragon)	JPN (Japan)	MAL (Malaysia)	AUS (Australia)	VAL (Valencian Community)	Pts
