= Nasser Al Malki =

Qatari motorcycle racer (born 1983)

Nasser Hassan Al Malki
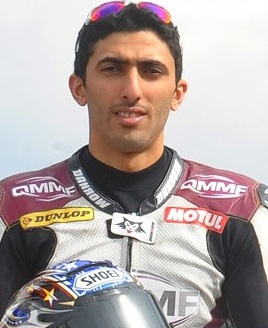
- Nationality: Qatari
- Born: 30 November 1983 (age 42); Doha, Qatar
Motorcycle racing career statistics
Moto2 World Championship
Active years	2011–2012, 2017
Manufacturers	Moriwaki, Speed Up
2017 championship position	NC (0 pts)
Starts / Wins / Podiums / Poles / F. laps / Points; 4 / 0 / 0 / 0 / 0 / 0
Supersport World Championship
Active years	2014, 2017
Manufacturers	Honda, Kawasaki
2017 championship position	NC (0 pts)
Starts / Wins / Podiums / Poles / F. laps / Points; 2 / 0 / 0 / 0 / 0 / 0

Nasser Hassan Al Malki (Arabic: ناصر حسن المالكي; born 30 November 1983 in Doha) is a Qatari motorcycle racer.

== Career statistics ==
=== FIM CEV Stock 600 Championship ===
==== Races by year ====
(key) (Races in bold indicate pole position) (Races in italics indicate fastest lap)

Year	Bike	1	2	3	4	5	6	7	8	9	10	11	Pos	Pts
2018	Kawasaki	EST1	EST2	VAL	CAT1	CAT2	ARA1	ARA2	JER; DNS	ALB1	ALB2	VAL	NC	0

==== By season ====
Season	Class	Motorcycle	Team	Race	Win	Podium	Pole	FLap	Pts	Plcd
2011	Moto2	Moriwaki	QMMF Racing Team	3	0	0	0	0	0	NC
2012	Moto2	Moriwaki	QMMF Racing Team	1	0	0	0	0	0	NC
2017	Moto2	Speed Up	QMMF Racing	0	0	0	0	0	0	NC
Total				**4**	**0**	**0**	**0**	**0**	**0**	

==== Races by year ====
(key)

Year	Class	Bike	1	2	3	4	5	6	7	8	9	10	11	12	13	14	15	16	17	18	Pos.	Pts
2011	Moto2	Moriwaki	QAT; 32	SPA	POR	FRA	CAT	GBR; 25	NED	ITA	GER	CZE	INP	RSM	ARA	JPN	AUS	MAL	VAL; 29		NC	0
2012	Moto2	Moriwaki	QAT; Ret	SPA	POR	FRA	CAT	GBR	NED	GER	ITA	INP	CZE	RSM	ARA	JPN	MAL	AUS	VAL		NC	0
2017	Moto2	Speed Up	QAT; DNS	ARG	AME	SPA	FRA	ITA	CAT	NED	GER	CZE	AUT	GBR	RSM	ARA	JPN	AUS	MAL	VAL	NC	0

=== Supersport World Championship ===
==== Races by year ====
(key) (Races in bold indicate pole position) (Races in italics indicate fastest lap)

Year	Bike	1	2	3	4	5	6	7	8	9	10	11	12	Pos.	Pts
2014	Honda	AUS	SPA	NED	ITA	GBR	MAL	ITA	POR	SPA	FRA	QAT; 16		NC	0
2017	Kawasaki	AUS	THA	SPA; 25	NED	ITA	GBR	ITA	GER	POR	FRA	SPA	QAT	NC	0
