= Felix Forstenhäusler =

German motorcycle racer

- Nationality: German
- Born: 10 June 1992 (age 34); Weingarten, Germany
- Website: felix-forstenhaeusler.de

Felix Forstenhäusler (*10 June 1992) is a Grand Prix motorcycle racer from Germany.

== Career statistics ==
=== By season ===
Season	Class	Motorcycle	Team	Number	Race	Win	Podium	Pole	FLap	Pts	Plcd
2011	125cc	Honda	Schwaben Racing Team	78	1	0	0	0	0	0	NC
Total					1	0	0	0	0	0	

=== Races by year ===
(key)

Yr	Class	Bike	1	2	3	4	5	6	7	8	9	10	11	12	13	14	15	16	17	Pos	Pts
2011	125cc	Honda	QAT	SPA	POR	FRA	CAT	GBR	NED	ITA	GER; 27	CZE	INP	RSM	ARA	JPN	AUS	MAL	VAL	NC	0
