= 2011 United States motorcycle Grand Prix =

2011 United States Grand Prix
Race details
- Race 10 of 18 races in the 2011 Grand Prix motorcycle racing season
- Date: July 24, 2011
- Official name: Red Bull U.S. Grand Prix
- Location: Mazda Raceway Laguna Seca
- Course: Permanent racing facility; 3.610 km (2.243 mi)

MotoGP
Pole position
- Rider: (Spain) Jorge Lorenzo
- Time: 1:21.202
Fastest lap
- Rider: (Australia) Casey Stoner
- Time: 1:21.673
Podium
- First: (Australia) Casey Stoner
- Second: (Spain) Jorge Lorenzo
- Third: (Spain) Dani Pedrosa

The 2011 United States motorcycle Grand Prix was the tenth round of the 2011 Grand Prix motorcycle racing season. It took place on the weekend of July 22–24, 2011 at Mazda Raceway Laguna Seca. As in previous years, only the MotoGP class raced at Laguna Seca, with the domestic Superbike, Sportbike, and Supersport championships joining the MotoGP class instead of the Moto2 and 125cc classes.

== MotoGP classification ==
Pos.	No.	Team	Rider	Manufacturer	Laps	Time/Retired	Grid	Points
1	27	(Australia) Casey Stoner	Repsol Honda Team	Honda	32	43:52.145	2	25
2	1	(Spain) Jorge Lorenzo	Yamaha Factory Racing	Yamaha	32	+5.634	1	20
3	26	(Spain) Dani Pedrosa	Repsol Honda Team	Honda	32	+9.467	3	16
4	11	(United States) Ben Spies	Yamaha Factory Racing	Yamaha	32	+20.562	4	13
5	4	(Italy) Andrea Dovizioso	Repsol Honda Team	Honda	32	+20.885	6	11
6	46	(Italy) Valentino Rossi	Ducati Team	Ducati	32	+30.351	7	10
7	69	(United States) Nicky Hayden	Ducati Team	Ducati	32	+31.031	9	9
8	5	(United States) Colin Edwards	Monster Yamaha Tech 3	Yamaha	32	+45.502	11	8
9	8	(Spain) Héctor Barberá	Mapfre Aspar Team MotoGP	Ducati	32	+51.549	8	7
10	7	(Japan) Hiroshi Aoyama	San Carlo Honda Gresini	Honda	32	+1:08.850	14	6
11	17	(Czech Republic) Karel Abraham	Cardion AB Motoracing	Ducati	32	+1:09.132	13	5
12	65	(Italy) Loris Capirossi	Pramac Racing Team	Ducati	31	+1 lap	15	4
13	24	(Spain) Toni Elías	LCR Honda MotoGP	Honda	31	+1 lap	16	3
Ret	19	(Spain) Álvaro Bautista	Rizla Suzuki MotoGP	Suzuki	13	Accident	12	
Ret	23	(United States) Ben Bostrom	LCR Honda MotoGP	Honda	8	Accident	17	
Ret	58	(Italy) Marco Simoncelli	San Carlo Honda Gresini	Honda	6	Accident	5	
Ret	35	(United Kingdom) Cal Crutchlow	Monster Yamaha Tech 3	Yamaha	3	Accident	10	
DNS	14	(France) Randy de Puniet	Pramac Racing Team	Ducati		Injury		

== Championship standings after the race (MotoGP) ==
Below are the standings for the top five riders and constructors after round ten has concluded.

Riders' Championship standings

Pos.	Rider	Points
1	(Australia) Casey Stoner	193
2	(Spain) Jorge Lorenzo	173
3	(Italy) Andrea Dovizioso	143
4	(Spain) Dani Pedrosa	110
5	(Italy) Valentino Rossi	108

Constructors' Championship standings

Pos.	Constructor	Points
1	(Japan) Honda	235
2	(Japan) Yamaha	204
3	(Italy) Ducati	117
4	(Japan) Suzuki	45

- Note: Only the top five positions are included for both sets of standings.

Previous race: 2011 German Grand Prix	FIM Grand Prix World Championship; 2011 season	Next race: 2011 Czech Republic Grand Prix
Previous race: 2010 United States Grand Prix	United States motorcycle Grand Prix	Next race: 2012 United States Grand Prix
