= Suter MMX2 =

Racing motorcycle

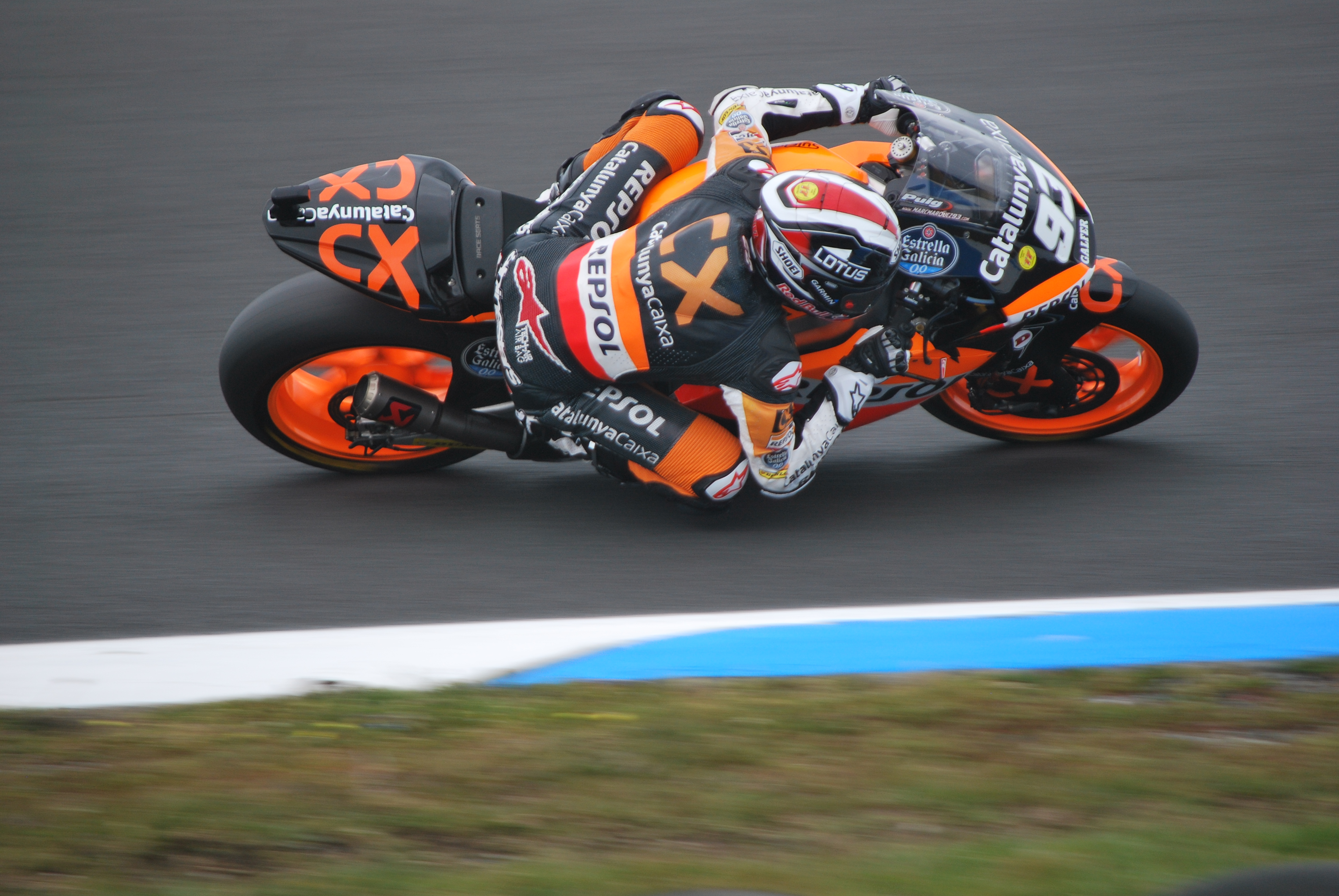
- Suter MMX2 used by Marc Márquez during the 2012 Moto2 season
- Category: Moto2
- Constructor: Suter Racing Technology

Technical specifications
- Chassis: Suter fully adjustable frame, Suter Moto2 swingarm
- Suspension (front): Öhlins FGR300 front forks
- Suspension (rear): TTX rear shock absorber
- Engine: Honda Racing Corporation 599 cc (0.6 L; 36.6 cu in) I4, DOHC, four valves per cylinder, naturally aspirated
- Transmission: 6-speed sequential manual, cassette-type
- Weight: 308 lb (140 kg) dry
- Fuel: 100 octane
- Tyres: Dunlop

Competition history
- Debut: 2010
- Constructors' Championships: 3
- Drivers' Championships: 1

The Suter MMX2 is a prototype racing motorcycle specifically developed by Suter Industries AG to race in the Moto2 series from 2010 to 2018. It had won three constructor's titles in that period of time. The MMX2 is manufactured by Suter Racing Technology, which was founded by Eskil Suter and had considerable racing experience prior to their entry as manufacturers for Moto2.

== Technical information ==
The Suter MMX2 has a 600cc four-stroke inline-four engine, built and serviced by ExternPro and equipped with a Honda Racing Corporation wiring loom and ECU. Its engine produces 129 hp (96 kW) with a 5-gallon fuel capacity, fuel mapping, and ignition adjustments. Additional gearing options were also available from the manufacturer.

The complete motorcycle weighs 308 lb (140 kg) dry.

== Racing history ==
During their short Moto2 history, Suter supplied the MMX2 to many teams, such as Forward Racing, Vector Kiefer Racing, Racing Team Germany, Marc VDS Racing Team and TechnoMag-CIP. With these teams, Suter won 3 consecutive manufacturer's titles and claimed their first rider's title with future MotoGP champion Marc Marquez.

During the Suter MMX2's debut season, it was one of the most popular bikes on the grid, with almost one third of the entries being MMX2s.

Belgian rider Xavier Simeon finished 2nd in 2014 Argentinian GP with Sutter MMx2 (Federal oil Gresini Team).

Swiss Dominique Aegerter won in 2017 Misano race.

=== Notable riders ===
Among those that rode the MMX2 in Moto2, there were a few notable riders, including Xavier Simeon (Gresini Racing), Marc Márquez (Repsol Honda), Johann Zarco (Red Bull KTM), Andrea Iannone (Aprilia Racing Team Gresini), Stefan Bradl (Red Bull KTM), Kenan Sofuoğlu, and Scott Redding.

==== Marc Márquez ====
Márquez won the rider's title in the 2012 season, having won 9 races (one of which was started from the back of the grid). During that season, Márquez won a total of 13 podiums and also his maiden Moto2 title before moving up to the Repsol Honda Team in the MotoGP premier class the following season. He also earned Suter their third and final manufacturer's title.

During the 2011 season, however, Márquez finished second behind Stefan Bradl and lost the title by 23 points. He had also crashed multiple times including a serious crash at Sepang, where he sustained an injury to his optic nerve during the start of free practice and subsequently did not participate in the race. The Spaniard had previously dominated on his MMX2, winning seven races and topping the riders' leaderboard after the race at Motegi. His season then went further downhill when he was penalized for crashing into fellow rider Ratthapark Wilairot during qualifying in Phillip Island, where he subsequently finished 3rd. This allowed Bradl to reclaim the championship lead.

Márquez had suggested that Honda would fast-track him to MotoGP; however, he would remain in Moto2 for the 2012 season.

==== Johann Zarco ====
Another notable rider is Johann Zarco, who rode the MMX2 in 2014 where he joined the then-new Caterham team and used a revised Suter frame. In the same season, he had a mixed season with four podiums and several crashes, with most of the crashes occurring at the beginning of the year.

Zarco subsequently joined the Kalex team in 2015 and won a Moto2 title that season.

==== Andrea Iannone ====
The Italian Andrea Iannone began his Moto2 career in 2010 riding for the Speed Up Moto2 team before riding an MMX2 for the 2011 season and switching bikes again in 2012. During his short stint in the Moto2 class, he garnered a total of eight wins and nineteen podiums. He then moved on to MotoGP in the 2013 season racing for the Pramac satellite team before moving to Ducati in 2015.

During his most successful season in 2011, he had scored multiple victories, which saw him finish 4th overall during that season where fellow riders Marc Márquez and Stefan Bradl, both on MMX2s, were battling for the 2011 Moto2 riders championship title. Iannone beat Márquez on several occasions, such as a well-known win in Motegi where Márquez finished second.

==== Stefan Bradl ====
Bradl debuted in the first Moto2 season in 2010, where he rode for Viessmann Kiefer Racing on an MMX2 and attained his maiden victory. For the 2011 Moto2 season, however, his team would switch to Kalex as a manufacturer, where he won rider's championship victory with a 23-point advantage over Marc Márquez, who was suffering from injuries during that season.

He would move on to MotoGP in the following season.

==== Kenan Sofuoğlu ====
Sofuoğlu had previously raced and dominated the Supersport World Championship and won 2 titles in the championship before joining the Technomag-CIP Suter team. He raced for the team in the last two rounds of the 2010 Moto2 season where he replaced the late rider Shoya Tomizawa, who was killed in a racing incident in Misano. Sofuoğlu had made his debut riding the MMX2 at Estoril in the 2010 season, where he impressed many by leading the race and eventually finished 5th. He looked set to take a maiden Moto2 win, but lost a seven-second lead to winner Stefan Bradl, who was also riding an MMX2.

Although it was his preference to ride a Moriwaki bike for the following season, and Gresini Racing was in talks to sign him for the 2011 season, he eventually signed on for another Moto2 season with the Technomag team. This was due to Eskil Suter helping to change his mind, where Sofuoğlu also stated that "I believe this team has the potential to win the title. I have seen it because I’ve ridden the bike at Estoril and here [Valencia], and I took this decision because I see a team that is very hungry to win the championship."

During the 2011 Moto2 season, however, he failed to impress, where he stated that "A full year in Moto2 in 2011 did not work out well partly because of a lack of feel with his machine". More importantly, though, he also stated that he had lost motivation to race due to the loss of his father. During that season, he was also involved in an incident during the Catalan Grand Prix, where he collided with fellow Moto2 rider Julian Simon (who was left with a broken tibia and fibula). Sofuoğlu was not penalized for his mistake.

Following a disappointing season where he finished 17th overall with 59 points, he returned to World SuperSport championship racing in 2012 with Kawasaki and eventually won the title.

==== Scott Redding ====
Redding started his Moto2 career riding the MMX2 in the maiden Moto2 season during 2010. He was a strong challenger in the Moto2 competition and had multiple podium finishes. He then moved to MotoGP for the 2014 season.

== Departure from Moto2 ==
=== Planned 2015 departure ===
Although Suter had achieved great success with their chassis leading up to 2015, it did not achieve much, since after their consecutive successes from the 2010 to 2012 season, Moto2 saw teams switching en masse to their rival Kalex. Despite subsequent success in 2014 with solid performances by Johann Zarco, Xavier Simeon and Dominique Aegerter, only two MMX2s appeared on the grid in the starting race of the 2015 season in Qatar.

After difficulties during the 2015 season, Suter reversed its decision to leave Moto2 and returned in 2016 with an updated MMX2. Suter stated that they had spent much time analyzing and working with their partners JPMoto Racing Malaysia and IodaRacing to refine and improve the MMX2, supposedly enabling them to compete for the manufacturer's and rider's titles in seasons to come. Prior to the 2016 season, Suter had updated the MMX2 with a new frame and swingarm. The rear suspension linkage had also been upgraded, and Suter also changed the range of adjustments that altered the bike's geometry and road stance. Changes to the rider's position, ergonomics and aerodynamics had also been revised and upgraded.

With a total of only 3 bikes used in 2016, Suter did not see how it was feasible for them to achieve commercial success. The two teams still using MMX2s, Ioda Racing and AGP, also had only rookie riders for that season, further diminishing any chances of Suter's renewed involvement in subsequent Moto2 seasons; without experienced riders to guide and continue developing the MMX2, it would not be able to compete for race podiums and wins.

=== 2018 departure ===
Suter returned to Moto2 for the 2016 season with an improved model, but they still had not achieved the success they once had and subsequently withdrew again in 2018.

Suter stating that producing motorcycles and parts for both Moto3 and Moto2 had put significant strain on their manufacturing and were not able to maintain both operations. They also stated that they did not see a good reason to continue supplying parts for Moto2, as they did not have enough customers or upcoming riders to help develop the bike. Suter then stated that there were no teams to show the huge potential of their fully-developed machine; with their last victory coming in 2014 with Thomas Lüthi, it is evident why they had decided to move away from Moto2. However, they stated that their racing division was still fully committed to engineering mandates for bigger motorcycle manufacturers in the Moto3 and MotoGP class.

Another reason for Suter finally exiting Moto2 was that the competition showed extreme conservatism, leading to the Moto2 class becoming a spec class (where the majority of the bikes were manufactured by Kalex). In 2016, only 3 manufacturers, Kalex, Speed Up and Tech 3, remained as manufacturers, and 26 of the entries were Kalex bikes.

2018 was Suter's final season in Moto2, with Forward Racing being the only team to use the MMX2 that year.
