= 2011 German motorcycle Grand Prix =

(Germany) 2011 German Grand Prix
Race details
- Race 9 of 18 races in the 2011 Grand Prix motorcycle racing season
- Date: 17 July 2011
- Official name: eni Motorrad Grand Prix Deutschland
- Location: Sachsenring
- Course: Permanent racing facility; 3.671 km (2.281 mi)

MotoGP
Pole position
- Rider: (Australia) Casey Stoner
- Time: 1:21.681
Fastest lap
- Rider: (Spain) Daniel Pedrosa
- Time: 1:21.846
Podium
- First: (Spain) Daniel Pedrosa
- Second: (Spain) Jorge Lorenzo
- Third: (Australia) Casey Stoner

Moto2
Pole position
- Rider: (Spain) Marc Márquez
- Time: 1:24.733
Fastest lap
- Rider: (Colombia) Yonny Hernández
- Time: 1:25.255
Podium
- First: (Spain) Marc Márquez
- Second: (Germany) Stefan Bradl
- Third: (San Marino) Alex de Angelis

125cc
Pole position
- Rider: (Spain) Maverick Viñales
- Time: 1:27.477
Fastest lap
- Rider: (Spain) Héctor Faubel
- Time: 1:27.867
Podium
- First: (Spain) Héctor Faubel
- Second: (France) Johann Zarco
- Third: (Spain) Maverick Viñales

The 2011 German motorcycle Grand Prix was the ninth round of the 2011 Grand Prix motorcycle racing season. It took place on the weekend of 15–17 July 2011 at the Sachsenring, located in Hohenstein-Ernstthal, Germany. The 125cc race was notable for producing a dead heat for first place between Héctor Faubel and Johann Zarco. After a photo finish could not separate the riders, Faubel was awarded first place on the basis that he set a faster laptime during the race.

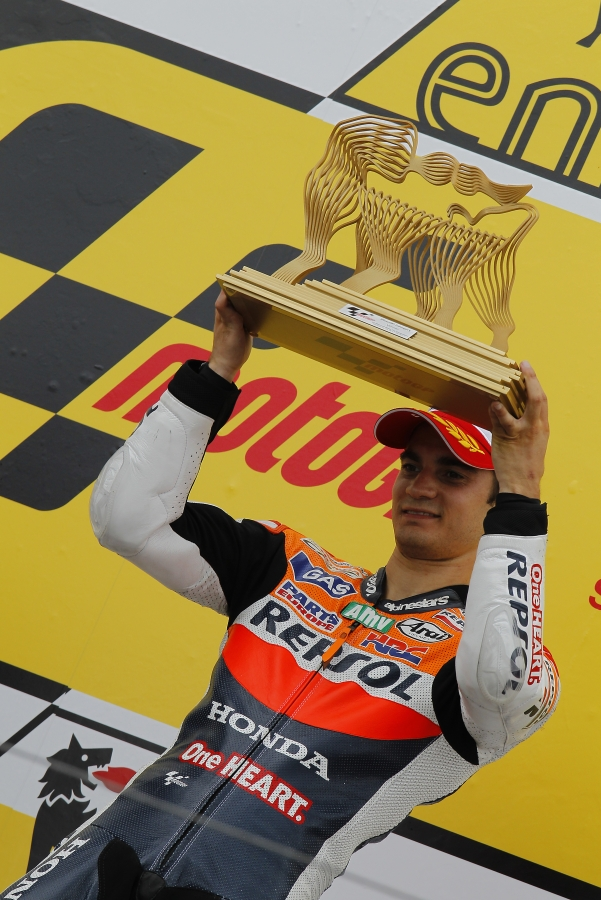
Dani Pedrosa, celebrating on the podium after winning the MotoGP race.

== MotoGP classification ==
Loris Capirossi was replaced by Sylvain Guintoli after the first practice session due to injuries sustained at the Dutch TT.

Pos.	No.	Rider	Team	Manufacturer	Laps	Time/Retired	Grid	Points
1	26	(Spain) Dani Pedrosa	Repsol Honda Team	Honda	30	41:12.482	2	25
2	1	(Spain) Jorge Lorenzo	Yamaha Factory Racing	Yamaha	30	+1.477	3	20
3	27	(Australia) Casey Stoner	Repsol Honda Team	Honda	30	+1.568	1	16
4	4	(Italy) Andrea Dovizioso	Repsol Honda Team	Honda	30	+10.513	6	13
5	11	(United States) Ben Spies	Yamaha Factory Racing	Yamaha	30	+10.719	5	11
6	58	(Italy) Marco Simoncelli	San Carlo Honda Gresini	Honda	30	+10.923	4	10
7	19	(Spain) Álvaro Bautista	Rizla Suzuki MotoGP	Suzuki	30	+27.451	10	9
8	69	(United States) Nicky Hayden	Ducati Team	Ducati	30	+27.510	8	8
9	46	(Italy) Valentino Rossi	Ducati Team	Ducati	30	+27.576	16	7
10	5	(United States) Colin Edwards	Monster Yamaha Tech 3	Yamaha	30	+33.491	7	6
11	8	(Spain) Héctor Barberá	Mapfre Aspar Team MotoGP	Ducati	30	+38.944	11	5
12	17	(Czech Republic) Karel Abraham	Cardion AB Motoracing	Ducati	30	+39.148	13	4
13	14	(France) Randy de Puniet	Pramac Racing Team	Ducati	30	+39.415	9	3
14	35	(United Kingdom) Cal Crutchlow	Monster Yamaha Tech 3	Yamaha	30	+39.477	12	2
15	7	(Japan) Hiroshi Aoyama	San Carlo Honda Gresini	Honda	30	+54.516	15	1
16	24	(Spain) Toni Elías	LCR Honda MotoGP	Honda	30	+1:12.335	14	
17	50	(France) Sylvain Guintoli	Pramac Racing Team	Ducati	29	+1 lap	17	

== Moto2 classification ==
Pos.	No.	Rider	Manufacturer	Laps	Time/Retired	Grid	Points
1	93	(Spain) Marc Márquez	Suter	29	41:37.457	1	25
2	65	(Germany) Stefan Bradl	Kalex	29	+0.896	2	20
3	15	(San Marino) Alex de Angelis	Motobi	29	+1.387	6	16
4	4	(Switzerland) Randy Krummenacher	Kalex	29	+3.413	15	13
5	12	(Switzerland) Thomas Lüthi	Suter	29	+4.185	12	11
6	68	(Colombia) Yonny Hernández	FTR	29	+7.691	10	10
7	45	(United Kingdom) Scott Redding	Suter	29	+10.606	23	9
8	3	(Italy) Simone Corsi	FTR	29	+10.667	21	8
9	16	(France) Jules Cluzel	Suter	29	+12.079	17	7
10	51	(Italy) Michele Pirro	Moriwaki	29	+12.337	4	6
11	54	(Turkey) Kenan Sofuoğlu	Suter	29	+13.197	20	5
12	77	(Switzerland) Dominique Aegerter	Suter	29	+21.516	28	4
13	44	(Spain) Pol Espargaró	FTR	29	+21.652	14	3
14	29	(Italy) Andrea Iannone	Suter	29	+21.827	25	2
15	71	(Italy) Claudio Corti	Suter	29	+22.238	27	1
16	63	(France) Mike Di Meglio	Tech 3	29	+22.359	22	
17	25	(Italy) Alex Baldolini	Suter	29	+26.498	29	
18	19	(Belgium) Xavier Siméon	Tech 3	29	+30.137	7	
19	75	(Italy) Mattia Pasini	FTR	29	+34.023	33	
20	9	(United States) Kenny Noyes	FTR	29	+34.188	26	
21	18	(Spain) Jordi Torres	Suter	29	+34.300	16	
22	80	(Spain) Axel Pons	Pons Kalex	29	+34.949	19	
23	13	(Australia) Anthony West	MZ-RE Honda	29	+49.149	31	
24	64	(Colombia) Santiago Hernández	FTR	29	+49.902	35	
25	14	(Thailand) Ratthapark Wilairot	FTR	29	+53.180	32	
26	39	(Venezuela) Robertino Pietri	Suter	29	+57.673	34	
27	97	(South Africa) Steven Odendaal	Suter	29	+1:12.318	36	
28	88	(Spain) Ricard Cardús	Moriwaki	29	+1:12.943	24	
29	24	(Italy) Tommaso Lorenzetti	FTR	28	+1 lap	37	
30	95	(Qatar) Mashel Al Naimi	Moriwaki	28	+1 lap	38	
Ret	72	(Japan) Yuki Takahashi	Moriwaki	23	Retirement	13	
Ret	34	(Spain) Esteve Rabat	FTR	19	Retirement	18	
Ret	38	(United Kingdom) Bradley Smith	Tech 3	15	Accident	9	
Ret	40	(Spain) Aleix Espargaró	Pons Kalex	5	Collision	3	
Ret	76	(Germany) Max Neukirchner	MZ-RE Honda	5	Collision	11	
Ret	53	(France) Valentin Debise	FTR	2	Accident	30	
Ret	60	(Spain) Julián Simón	Suter	0	Accident	5	
DNS	36	(Finland) Mika Kallio	Suter	0	Did not start	8	
DNS	31	(Spain) Carmelo Morales	Suter		Did not start		
OFFICIAL MOTO2 REPORT

== 125 cc classification ==
Pos.	No.	Rider	Manufacturer	Laps	Time/Retired	Grid	Points
1	55	(Spain) Héctor Faubel	Aprilia	27	39:57.979	2	25
2	5	(France) Johann Zarco	Derbi	27	+0.000	6	20
3	25	(Spain) Maverick Viñales	Aprilia	27	+0.272	1	16
4	18	(Spain) Nicolás Terol	Aprilia	27	+1.723	4	13
5	39	(Spain) Luis Salom	Aprilia	27	+2.784	3	11
6	33	(Spain) Sergio Gadea	Aprilia	27	+6.786	5	10
7	94	(Germany) Jonas Folger	Aprilia	27	+13.116	9	9
8	11	(Germany) Sandro Cortese	Aprilia	27	+13.414	15	8
9	52	(United Kingdom) Danny Kent	Aprilia	27	+13.710	10	7
10	31	(Finland) Niklas Ajo	Aprilia	27	+29.090	14	6
11	23	(Spain) Alberto Moncayo	Aprilia	27	+29.341	8	5
12	42	(Germany) Toni Finsterbusch	KTM	27	+33.483	28	4
13	84	(Czech Republic) Jakub Kornfeil	Aprilia	27	+34.357	30	3
14	99	(United Kingdom) Danny Webb	Mahindra	27	+34.405	16	2
15	53	(Netherlands) Jasper Iwema	Aprilia	27	+36.878	24	1
16	77	(Germany) Marcel Schrötter	Mahindra	27	+43.087	13	
17	15	(Italy) Simone Grotzkyj	Aprilia	27	+43.123	19	
18	96	(France) Louis Rossi	Aprilia	27	+52.487	23	
19	3	(Italy) Luigi Morciano	Aprilia	27	+1:01.936	18	
20	30	(Switzerland) Giulian Pedone	Aprilia	27	+1:04.494	29	
21	50	(Norway) Sturla Fagerhaug	Aprilia	27	+1:05.804	27	
22	43	(Italy) Francesco Mauriello	Aprilia	27	+1:05.900	31	
23	36	(Spain) Joan Perelló	Aprilia	27	+1:24.205	33	
24	63	(Malaysia) Zulfahmi Khairuddin	Derbi	27	+1:27.327	17	
25	19	(Italy) Alessandro Tonucci	Aprilia	27	+1:27.505	34	
26	10	(France) Alexis Masbou	KTM	26	+1 lap	22	
27	78	(Germany) Felix Forstenhäusler	Honda	26	+1 lap	35	
Ret	26	(Spain) Adrián Martín	Aprilia	26	Collision	12	
Ret	21	(United Kingdom) Harry Stafford	Aprilia	26	Collision	20	
Ret	41	(Germany) Luca Grünwald	KTM	23	Retirement	25	
Ret	7	(Spain) Efrén Vázquez	Derbi	20	Accident	7	
Ret	56	(Hungary) Péter Sebestyén	KTM	19	Retirement	32	
Ret	70	(Germany) Marvin Fritz	Honda	8	Retirement	36	
Ret	73	(Australia) Jack Miller	Aprilia	3	Retirement	26	
Ret	44	(Portugal) Miguel Oliveira	Aprilia	2	Accident	11	
Ret	17	(United Kingdom) Taylor Mackenzie	Aprilia	2	Accident	21	
OFFICIAL 125cc REPORT

== Championship standings after the race (MotoGP) ==
Below are the standings for the top five riders and constructors after round nine has concluded.

Riders' Championship standings

Pos.	Rider	Points
1	(Australia) Casey Stoner	168
2	(Spain) Jorge Lorenzo	153
3	(Italy) Andrea Dovizioso	132
4	(Italy) Valentino Rossi	98
5	(Spain) Dani Pedrosa	94

Constructors' Championship standings

Pos.	Constructor	Points
1	(Japan) Honda	210
2	(Japan) Yamaha	184
3	(Italy) Ducati	107
4	(Japan) Suzuki	45

- Note: Only the top five positions are included for both sets of standings.

Previous race: 2011 Italian Grand Prix	FIM Grand Prix World Championship; 2011 season	Next race: 2011 United States Grand Prix
Previous race: 2010 German Grand Prix	German motorcycle Grand Prix	Next race: 2012 German Grand Prix
