= 2011 Australian motorcycle Grand Prix =

(Australia) 2011 Australian Grand Prix
Race details
- Race 16 of 18 races in the 2011 Grand Prix motorcycle racing season
- Date: 16 October 2011
- Official name: Iveco Australian Motorcycle Grand Prix
- Location: Phillip Island Grand Prix Circuit
- Course: Permanent racing facility; 4.448 km (2.764 mi)

MotoGP
Pole position
- Rider: (Australia) Casey Stoner
- Time: 1:29.975
Fastest lap
- Rider: (Australia) Casey Stoner
- Time: 1:30.629
Podium
- First: (Australia) Casey Stoner
- Second: (Italy) Marco Simoncelli
- Third: (Italy) Andrea Dovizioso

Moto2
Pole position
- Rider: (San Marino) Alex de Angelis
- Time: 1:34.574
Fastest lap
- Rider: (San Marino) Alex de Angelis
- Time: 1:34.549
Podium
- First: (San Marino) Alex de Angelis
- Second: (Germany) Stefan Bradl
- Third: (Spain) Marc Márquez

125cc
Pole position
- Rider: (France) Johann Zarco
- Time: 1:39.207
Fastest lap
- Rider: (Germany) Sandro Cortese
- Time: 1:40.276
Podium
- First: (Germany) Sandro Cortese
- Second: (Spain) Luis Salom
- Third: (France) Johann Zarco

The 2011 Australian motorcycle Grand Prix was the sixteenth round of the 2011 Grand Prix motorcycle racing season. It took place on the weekend of 14–16 October 2011 at the Phillip Island Grand Prix Circuit.

Australian rider Casey Stoner clinched the 2011 MotoGP World Championship with his fifth consecutive victory at his home Grand Prix on his 26th birthday. Italian rider Marco Simoncelli recorded his final podium finish at this event before being fatally injured at the following race in Malaysia.

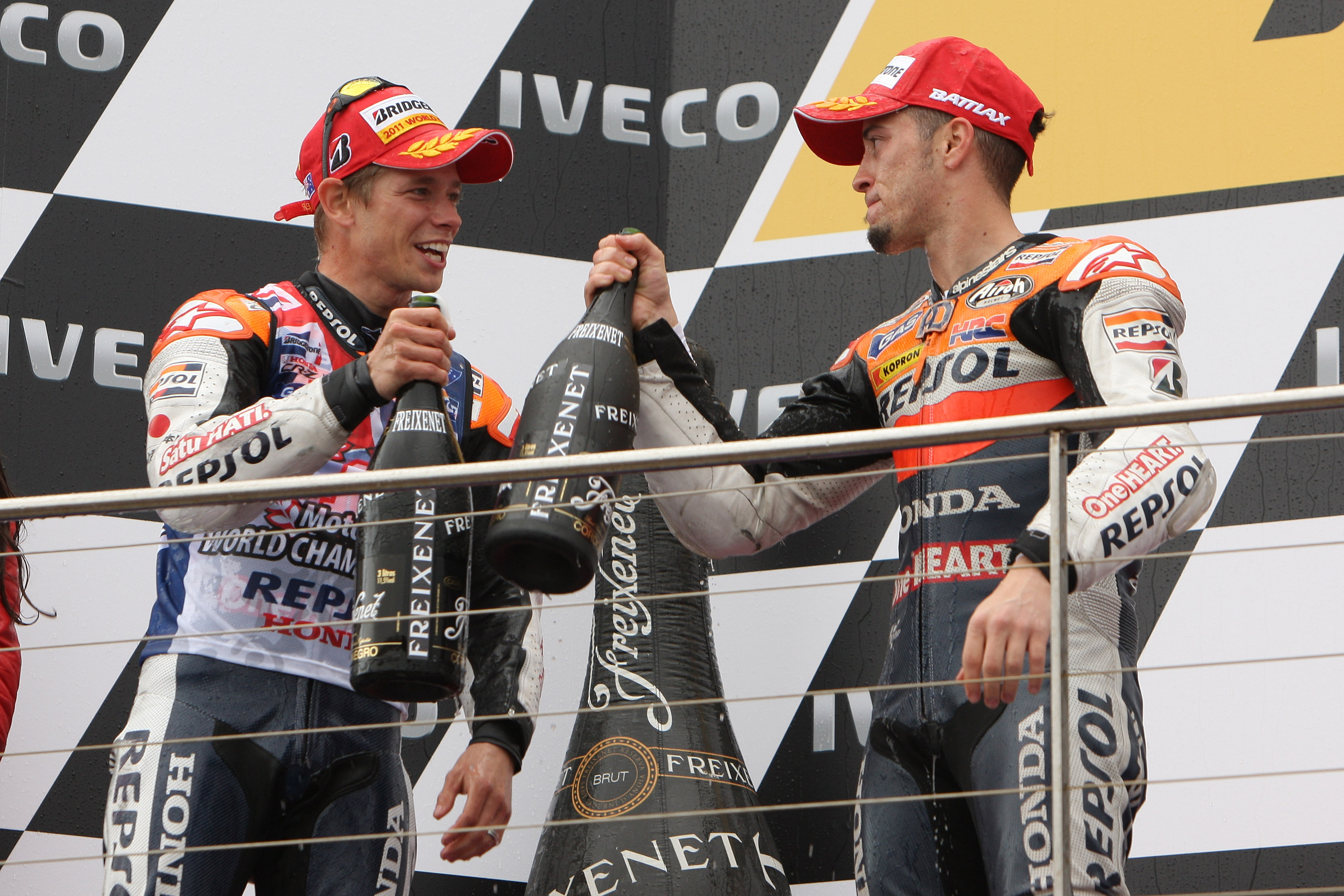
Race winner Casey Stoner, toasting the champagne with third place Andrea Dovizioso on the podium at the MotoGP race.

== MotoGP classification ==
Pos.	No.	Rider	Team	Manufacturer	Laps	Time/Retired	Grid	Points
1	27	(Australia) Casey Stoner	Repsol Honda Team	Honda	27	42:02.425	1	25
2	58	(Italy) Marco Simoncelli	San Carlo Honda Gresini	Honda	27	+2.210	2	20
3	4	(Italy) Andrea Dovizioso	Repsol Honda Team	Honda	27	+2.454	4	16
4	26	(Spain) Dani Pedrosa	Repsol Honda Team	Honda	27	+13.160	6	13
5	5	(United States) Colin Edwards	Monster Yamaha Tech 3	Yamaha	27	+30.886	7	11
6	14	(France) Randy de Puniet	Pramac Racing Team	Ducati	27	+48.800	9	10
7	69	(United States) Nicky Hayden	Ducati Team	Ducati	27	+1:16.314	5	9
8	24	(Spain) Toni Elías	LCR Honda MotoGP	Honda	26	+1 lap	14	8
9	65	(Italy) Loris Capirossi	Pramac Racing Team	Ducati	26	+1 lap	8	7
10	17	(Czech Republic) Karel Abraham	Cardion AB Motoracing	Ducati	25	+2 laps	13	6
Ret	19	(Spain) Álvaro Bautista	Rizla Suzuki MotoGP	Suzuki	23	Accident	3	
Ret	7	(Japan) Hiroshi Aoyama	San Carlo Honda Gresini	Honda	23	Accident	10	
Ret	35	(United Kingdom) Cal Crutchlow	Monster Yamaha Tech 3	Yamaha	23	Accident	12	
Ret	46	(Italy) Valentino Rossi	Ducati Team	Ducati	13	Accident	11	
DNS	1	(Spain) Jorge Lorenzo	Yamaha Factory Racing	Yamaha		Injury		
DNS	11	(United States) Ben Spies	Yamaha Factory Racing	Yamaha		Injury		
DNS	6	(Australia) Damian Cudlin	Pramac Racing Team	Ducati		Injury		

== Moto2 classification ==
Pos.	No.	Rider	Manufacturer	Laps	Time/Retired	Grid	Points
1	15	(San Marino) Alex de Angelis	Motobi	25	39:44.774	1	25
2	65	(Germany) Stefan Bradl	Kalex	25	+1.358	8	20
3	93	(Spain) Marc Márquez	Suter	25	+6.362	38 (Note: Márquez had one minute added onto his qualifying time for crashing into the back of Wilairot at the end of the Friday morning practice session.)	16
4	71	(Italy) Claudio Corti	Suter	25	+6.475	20	13
5	44	(Spain) Pol Espargaró	FTR	25	+14.815	6	11
6	54	(Turkey) Kenan Sofuoğlu	Suter	25	+15.155	5	10
7	45	(United Kingdom) Scott Redding	Suter	25	+15.261	4	9
8	29	(Italy) Andrea Iannone	Suter	25	+16.047	16	8
9	63	(France) Mike Di Meglio	Tech 3	25	+16.331	2	7
10	72	(Japan) Yuki Takahashi	Moriwaki	25	+20.337	3	6
11	12	(Switzerland) Thomas Lüthi	Suter	25	+22.081	9	5
12	77	(Switzerland) Dominique Aegerter	Suter	25	+26.248	13	4
13	40	(Spain) Aleix Espargaró	Pons Kalex	25	+29.295	24	3
14	51	(Italy) Michele Pirro	Moriwaki	25	+30.203	12	2
15	3	(Italy) Simone Corsi	FTR	25	+30.745	22	1
16	36	(Finland) Mika Kallio	Suter	25	+30.776	15	
17	88	(Spain) Ricard Cardús	Moriwaki	25	+30.784	27	
18	38	(United Kingdom) Bradley Smith	Tech 3	25	+43.520	7	
19	80	(Spain) Axel Pons	Pons Kalex	25	+47.064	25	
20	35	(Italy) Raffaele De Rosa	Suter	25	+50.357	19	
21	4	(Switzerland) Randy Krummenacher	Kalex	25	+50.364	33	
22	9	(United States) Kenny Noyes	FTR	25	+1:04.747	26	
23	6	(Spain) Joan Olivé	FTR	25	+1:04.907	30	
24	68	(Colombia) Yonny Hernández	FTR	25	+1:19.734	29	
25	20	(Spain) Iván Moreno	Suter	24	+1 lap	31	
26	64	(Colombia) Santiago Hernández	FTR	24	+1 lap	34	
27	56	(Australia) Blake Leigh-Smith	FTR	24	+1 lap	35	
28	95	(Qatar) Mashel Al Naimi	Moriwaki	24	+1 lap	37	
Ret	39	(Venezuela) Robertino Pietri	Suter	20	Retirement	36	
Ret	53	(France) Valentin Debise	FTR	19	Retirement	28	
Ret	43	(Australia) Kris McLaren	Suter	14	Accident	32	
Ret	19	(Belgium) Xavier Siméon	Tech 3	12	Accident	23	
Ret	16	(France) Jules Cluzel	Suter	12	Retirement	21	
Ret	76	(Germany) Max Neukirchner	MZ-RE Honda	1	Accident	11	
Ret	75	(Italy) Mattia Pasini	FTR	0	Accident	10	
Ret	18	(Spain) Jordi Torres	Suter	0	Accident	14	
Ret	34	(Spain) Esteve Rabat	FTR	0	Accident	17	
Ret	13	(Australia) Anthony West	MZ-RE Honda	0	Accident	18	
DNS	14	(Thailand) Ratthapark Wilairot	FTR		Injury		
OFFICIAL MOTO2 REPORT

== 125 cc classification ==
The race was stopped after 20 laps due to an accident involving Niklas Ajo.

Pos.	No.	Rider	Manufacturer	Laps	Time/Retired	Grid	Points
1	11	(Germany) Sandro Cortese	Aprilia	20	34:49.670	2	25
2	39	(Spain) Luis Salom	Aprilia	20	+13.572	10	20
3	5	(France) Johann Zarco	Derbi	20	+14.311	1	16
4	7	(Spain) Efrén Vázquez	Derbi	20	+14.926	6	13
5	23	(Spain) Alberto Moncayo	Aprilia	20	+22.328	8	11
6	18	(Spain) Nicolás Terol	Aprilia	20	+26.689	4	10
7	55	(Spain) Héctor Faubel	Aprilia	20	+28.887	5	9
8	25	(Spain) Maverick Viñales	Aprilia	20	+35.635	9	8
9	96	(France) Louis Rossi	Aprilia	20	+36.553	12	7
10	99	(United Kingdom) Danny Webb	Mahindra	20	+36.686	18	6
11	77	(Germany) Marcel Schrötter	Mahindra	20	+38.608	19	5
12	3	(Italy) Luigi Morciano	Aprilia	20	+41.697	11	4
13	84	(Czech Republic) Jakub Kornfeil	Aprilia	20	+43.349	13	3
14	10	(France) Alexis Masbou	KTM	20	+47.896	15	2
15	50	(Norway) Sturla Fagerhaug	Aprilia	20	+55.159	22	1
16	19	(Italy) Alessandro Tonucci	Aprilia	20	+56.909	16	
17	28	(Spain) Josep Rodríguez	Aprilia	20	+1:10.093	20	
18	17	(United Kingdom) Taylor Mackenzie	Aprilia	20	+1:10.237	27	
19	60	(Italy) Manuel Tatasciore	Aprilia	20	+1:10.802	21	
20	63	(Malaysia) Zulfahmi Khairuddin	Derbi	20	+1:10.844	26	
21	14	(South Africa) Brad Binder	Aprilia	20	+1:27.965	24	
22	52	(United Kingdom) Danny Kent	Aprilia	20	+1:37.676	7	
23	8	(Australia) Jack Miller	KTM	20	+1:40.315	28	
24	40	(Switzerland) Marco Colandrea	Aprilia	19	+1 lap	30	
25	30	(Switzerland) Giulian Pedone	Aprilia	19	+1 lap	23	
26	46	(Australia) Joshua Hook	Aprilia	19	+1 lap	32	
27	26	(Spain) Adrián Martín	Aprilia	19	+1 lap	14	
Ret	31	(Finland) Niklas Ajo	Aprilia	19	Accident	17	
Ret	36	(Spain) Joan Perelló	Aprilia	12	Retirement	29	
Ret	53	(Netherlands) Jasper Iwema	Aprilia	9	Retirement	25	
Ret	47	(Australia) Nicky Diles	Aprilia	6	Retirement	31	
DNS	94	(Germany) Jonas Folger	Aprilia	0	Engine	3	
DNS	21	(United Kingdom) Harry Stafford	Aprilia		Injury		
DNQ	48	(Australia) Alexander Phillis	Aprilia		Did not qualify		
DNQ	45	(Australia) Tom Hatton	Honda		Did not qualify		
DNQ	49	(New Zealand) Avalon Biddle	Honda		Did not qualify		
OFFICIAL 125cc REPORT

== Championship standings after the race (MotoGP) ==
Below are the standings for the top five riders and constructors after round sixteen has concluded.

Riders' Championship standings

Pos.	Rider	Points
1	(Australia) Casey Stoner	325
2	(Spain) Jorge Lorenzo	260
3	(Italy) Andrea Dovizioso	212
4	(Spain) Dani Pedrosa	208
5	(United States) Ben Spies	156

Constructors' Championship standings

Pos.	Constructor	Points
1	(Japan) Honda	380
2	(Japan) Yamaha	305
3	(Italy) Ducati	172
4	(Japan) Suzuki	73

- Note: Only the top five positions are included for both sets of standings.

Previous race: 2011 Japanese Grand Prix	FIM Grand Prix World Championship; 2011 season	Next race: 2011 Malaysian Grand Prix
Previous race: 2010 Australian Grand Prix	Australian motorcycle Grand Prix	Next race: 2012 Australian Grand Prix
