= 2011 CEV Moto2 Season =

Inaugural season of the CEV Moto2 season

2011 FIM CEV Moto2 European Championship
Previous:	2010	Next:	2012

The 2011 FIM CEV Moto2 European Championship was the second season of the CEV Moto2 season. The season was held over 7 races at 7 meetings, beginning on 17 April at Circuito de Jerez and finished on 20 November also at Circuito de Jerez. Jordi Torres won the title after beating his teammate and reigning champion Carmelo Morales by 10 points.

== Calendar ==
2011 Calendar
Round	Date	Circuit	Pole position	Fastest lap	Race winner	Winning team	Winning constructor
1	17 April	(Spain) Jerez 1	(Spain) Carmelo Morales	(Spain) Carmelo Morales	(Spain) Jordi Torres	(Spain) Gigaset LagLisse	Suter
2	8 May	(Spain) Aragón	(Spain) Carmelo Morales	(Spain) Carmelo Morales	(Spain) Carmelo Morales	(Spain) Gigaset LagLisse	Suter
3	19 June	(Spain) Catalunya	(Spain) Carmelo Morales	(Spain) Jordi Torres	(Spain) Jordi Torres	(Spain) Gigaset LagLisse	Suter
4	10 July	(Spain) Albacete 1	(Spain) Carmelo Morales	(Spain) Carmelo Morales	(Spain) Carmelo Morales	(Spain) Gigaset LagLisse	Suter
5	11 September	(Spain) Albacete 2	(Spain) Carmelo Morales	(Spain) Jordi Torres	(Spain) Jordi Torres	(Spain) Gigaset LagLisse	Suter
6	13 November	(Spain) Valencia	(Spain) Carmelo Morales	(Spain) Román Ramos	(Spain) Isaac Viñales	(Spain) Promoracing	Harris
7	20 November	(Spain) Jerez 2	(South Africa) Matthew Scholtz	(Spain) Isaac Viñales	(France) Lucas Mahias	(Spain) Inmotec Moto2	Inmotec

== Entry list ==
Team	Constructor	No.	Rider	Rounds
(Spain) Argiñano Racing	AJR	40	(Spain) Román Ramos	5–6
(Spain) Champi Team	AJR	51	(Spain) Álvaro Sánchez	1–4
(Spain) Champi Team	AJR	67	(Spain) Jordi Valls	2–5
(Spain) FR Motorrad	AJR	28	(Spain) Pau Tortosa	6–7
(Spain) Fullgas	AJR	36	(Spain) Juan David Lopez	1–2, 4–5
(Spain) Ilusion Team	AJR	12	(Spain) Fran Rodríguez	1–3
(Spain) LS2 Motorrad	AJR	6	(Spain) Sergio Fuertes	3
(Spain) LS2 Motorrad	AJR	23	(Spain) Adrián Bonastre	All
(Spain) LS2 Motorrad	AJR	65	(United Kingdom) Nikki Coates	All
(Spain) LS2 Motorrad	AJR	88	(Spain) Amadeo LLados	All
(Spain) MR Griful	AJR	17	(Spain) Russell Gómez	1, 3–7
(Spain) MR Griful	AJR	24	(Spain) Arturo Tizón	2–7
(Spain) MR Griful	AJR	74	(Argentina) Andrés González	All
(Spain) RCSport	AJR	55	(Spain) Ezequiel Iturrioz	7
(Spain) Red Racing	AJR	8	(Spain) Josep Pedro	6
(Spain) Red Racing	AJR	91	(Spain) Didac Fernandez	1–3
(Spain) Red Racing	AJR	91	(Spain) Julio Palau	4
(Spain) Spirit Racing Team	AJR	95	(Spain) Javier Martínez	4, 6–7
(Spain) Motorrad Ariane	Ariane	7	(Spain) Dani Rivas	5–7
(Spain) Motorrad Ariane	Ariane	10	(Spain) Xavi Forés	4
(Spain) X-Bike Ariane2	Ariane	81	(Spain) Angel Molero	1
(Spain) SAG Castrol	Bimota	68	(Spain) Juan Ramírez	All
(Spain) SAG Castrol	Bimota	77	(Spain) David Pros	1–6
(Spain) SAG Castrol	Bimota	89	(Spain) David Salom	7
(Spain) Equipo Almasora	Bottpower	33	(Spain) Antonio Gallardo	1
(Spain) Medes-Bottpower	Bottpower	15	(Spain) David Tirado	7
(Italy) Andreozzi Reparto Corse	FTR	22	(Italy) Alessandro Andreozzi	7
(United Kingdom) BRP Racing	FTR	56	(Australia) Blake Leigh-Smith	1–5
(Russia) DMC Team	FTR	61	(Russia) Alexey Ivanov	1–2
(United Kingdom) Honda Joe Darcey	FTR	54	(United Kingdom) Kev Coghlan	6–7
(Spain) H43 Hernandez	H43	34	(Spain) Guillermo Casas	1–5
(Spain) H43 Hernandez	H43	34	(Portugal) Ivo Lopes	6–7
(Spain) H43 Hernandez	H43	39	(Argentina) Juan Martin Solorza	4
(Spain) H43 Hernandez	H43	76	(Spain) Luis Miguel Mora	All
(Germany) IAMT Factory Team	IAMT	25	(Germany) Toni Wirsing	1–2
(Germany) IAMT Factory Team	IAMT	52	(Czech Republic) Lukáš Pešek	2–4
(France) Binoche Racing Team	Inmotec	13	(France) Renaud Binoche	1, 4
(Spain) Inmotec Moto2	Inmotec	99	(France) Lucas Mahias	7
(Spain) Tirado Team	Inmotec	15	(Spain) David Tirado	1–4, 6
(Spain) MIR Racing	MIR Racing	27	(Spain) Adrian Menchén	All
(Spain) MIR Racing	MIR Racing	69	(Spain) Javier Alviz	6–7
(Spain) Team Climent	MIR Racing	16	(Spain) Óscar Climent	All
(Spain) Zero Racing Team	MIR Racing	43	(Spain) Eric Molina	6–7
(Spain) Zero Racing Team	MIR Racing	57	(Spain) Javier Sanchez	5
(Spain) Zero Racing Team	MIR Racing	70	(Spain) Daniel Arcas	2–4
(Qatar) QMMF Racing Team	Moriwaki	96	(Qatar) Nasser Al Malki	3, 5
(Spain) Team Andalucía Banca Cívica	Moriwaki	21	(Spain) Iván Moreno	1–6
(Germany) MZ Racing Team	MZ-RE Honda	41	(Germany) Arne Tode	2–3
(Germany) MZ Racing Team	MZ-RE Honda	50	(Sweden) Alexander Lundh	6
(Germany) MZ Racing Team	MZ-RE Honda	83	(Germany) Bernd Hiemer	1–2, 6–7
(Germany) MZ Racing Team	MZ-RE Honda	94	(Germany) Jonas Folger	7
(Spain) Promoracing	Promoharris	20	(South Africa) Matthew Scholtz	All
(Spain) Promoracing	Promoharris	32	(United States) Jacob Gagne	1–5
(Spain) Promoracing	Promoharris	44	(Spain) Isaac Viñales	All
(Spain) Team Wilmax	Promoharris	4	(United Kingdom) Dan Linfoot	4–7
(Spain) Team Wilmax	Promoharris	6	(United States) Tommy Aquino	6–7
(Spain) Team Wilmax	Promoharris	11	(Spain) Wilmar Miranda	1–2
(Spain) Arcoinser-TMR	SR–7	30	(Spain) Pere Tutusaus	6
(Spain) Arcoinser-TMR	SR–7	69	(Spain) Javier Alviz	1–5
(Spain) Argiñano Racing	Suter	40	(Spain) Román Ramos	1–4, 7
(Spain) Argiñano Racing	Suter	48	(Spain) Gastón Garcia	All
(United Kingdom) BRP Racing	Suter	56	(Australia) Blake Leigh-Smith	6–7
(France) CIP Moto2	Suter	75	(Japan) Tomoyoshi Koyama	All
Equipe de France Vitesse Espoir	Suter	66	(France) Lucas Mahias	3
Equipe de France Vitesse Espoir	Suter	66	(France) Grégory Di Carlo	4–5
Equipe de France Vitesse Espoir	Suter	90	(France) Louis Bulle	6–7
(Italy) Faenza Racing	Suter	71	(Italy) Mattia Tarozzi	1–4, 6–7
(Spain) Gigaset LagLisse	Suter	18	(Spain) Jordi Torres	All
(Spain) Gigaset LagLisse	Suter	31	(Spain) Carmelo Morales	All
(Spain) Gigaset LagLisse	Suter	37	(Spain) Hugo Martínez	All
(Spain) Gigaset LagLisse	Suter	72	(Spain) Jaume Ferrer	All
(Spain) Mapfre Aspar Powerade LagLisse	Suter	82	(Spain) Elena Rosell	5–7

== Championship standings ==
Pos.	Rider	Bike	JER 1 (Spain)	ARA (Spain)	CAT (Spain)	ALB 1 (Spain)	ALB 2 (Spain)	VAL (Spain)	JER 2 (Spain)	Pts
1	(Spain) Jordi Torres	Suter	1	2	1^{F}	2	1^{F}	3	8	139
2	(Spain) Carmelo Morales	Suter	2^{P}^{F}	1^{P}^{F}	2^{P}	1^{P}^{F}	2^{P}	8^{P}	5	129
3	(Japan) Tomoyoshi Koyama	Suter	4	4	3	9	4	6	10	78
4	(Spain) Román Ramos	Suter	6	9	5	12			7	72
4	(Spain) Román Ramos	AJR					5	2^{F}		72
5	(Spain) Isaac Viñales	Promoharris	7	Ret	7	5	Ret	1	4^{F}	67
6	(South Africa) Matthew Scholtz	Promoharris	Ret	11	6	11	7	5	6^{P}	50
7	(Spain) Iván Moreno	Moriwaki	3	3	26	3	Ret	Ret		48
8	(Spain) Adrián Bonastre	AJR	8	8	Ret	7	3	20	19	41
9	(United Kingdom) Dan Linfoot	Promoharris				16	8	4	3	37
10	(Spain) Arturo Tizón	AJR		5	Ret	6	6	Ret	Ret	31
11	(France) Lucas Mahias	Suter			12					29
11	(France) Lucas Mahias	Inmotec							1	29
12	(United Kingdom) Kev Coghlan	FTR						7	2	29
13	(Spain) Russell Gómez	AJR	Ret		4	4	Ret	Ret	24	26
14	(Spain) Adrian Menchén	MIR Racing	Ret	6	Ret	14	10	9	15	26
15	(Spain) David Tirado	Inmotec	10	7	24	10		Ret		21
15	(Spain) David Tirado	Bottpower							20	21
16	(Spain) Óscar Climent	MIR Racing	Ret	10	9	13	12	Ret	Ret	20
17	(United States) Jake Gagne	Promoharris	5	Ret	Ret	Ret	9			18
18	(Italy) Mattia Tarozzi	Suter	9	13	17	20		11	30	15
19	(Spain) Dani Rivas	Ariane					Ret	10	11	11
20	(Germany) Bernd Hiemer	MZ-RE Honda	14	24				15	9	10
21	(Australia) Blake Leigh-Smith	FTR	Ret	12	11	15	Ret			10
21	(Australia) Blake Leigh-Smith	Suter						Ret	25	10
22	(Argentina) Andrés González	AJR	13	14	14	Ret	13	Ret	23	10
23	(Spain) Jaume Ferrer	Suter	12	25	Ret	23	11	Ret	Ret	9
24	(Spain) Daniel Arcas	MIR Racing		19	8	Ret				8
25	(Spain) Xavi Forés	Ariane				8				8
26	(Spain) Luis Miguel Mora	H43	11	20	13	25	Ret	22	31	8
27	(Czech Republic) Lukáš Pešek	IAMT		23	10	Ret				6
28	(Italy) Alessandro Andreozzi	FTR							12	4
29	(Spain) Pau Tortosa	AJR						12	21	4
30	(Spain) Gastón Garcia	Suter	WD	Ret	21	22	14	14	22	4
31	(Spain) Eric Molina	MIR Racing						17	13	3
32	(United States) Tommy Aquino	Promoharris						13	28	3
33	(Spain) David Salom	Bimota							14	2
34	(United Kingdom) Nikki Coates	AJR	Ret	16	19	17	15	Ret	26	1
35	(Germany) Arne Tode	MZ-RE Honda		17	15					1
36	(Spain) David Pros	Bimota	21	15	18	18	Ret	DNS		1
37	(Spain) Álvaro Sánchez	AJR	15	18	16	Ret				1
	(Spain) Juan Ramírez	Bimota	17	21	Ret	24	16	19	17	0
	(Spain) Amadeo Llados	AJR	16	26	Ret	Ret	17	21	WD	0
	(Spain) Elena Rosell	Suter					Ret	16	WD	0
	(France) Louis Bulle	Suter						Ret	16	0
	(Spain) Guillermo Casas	H43	Ret	22	22	19	18			0
	(Germany) Toni Wirsing	IAMT	18	28						0
	(Spain) Pere Tutusaus	SR–7						18		0
	(Germany) Jonas Folger	MZ-RE Honda							18	0
	(Spain) Hugo Martínez	Suter	20	33	20	27	19	24	33	0
	(Spain) Didac Fernandez	AJR	19	27	25					0
	(Spain) Javier Alviz	SR–7	22	29	23	21	20			0
	(Spain) Javier Alviz	MIR Racing						Ret	32	0
	(Qatar) Nasser Al Malki	Moriwaki			27		21			0
	(Spain) Juan David Lopez	AJR	23	31		29	Ret			0
	(Spain) Josep Pedro	AJR						23		0
	(France) Renaud Binoche	Inmotec	24			26				0
	(Spain) Wilmar Miranda	Promoharris	25	30						0
	(Sweden) Alexander Lundh	MZ-RE Honda						25		0
	(Spain) Javier Martínez	AJR				31		26	34	0
	(Portugal) Ivo Lopes	H43						Ret	27	0
	(Spain) Fran Rodríguez	AJR	Ret	34	28					0
	(Spain) Julio Palau	AJR				28				0
	(Argentina) Ezequiel Iturrioz	AJR							29	0
	(Argentina) Juan Martin Solorza	H43				30				0
	(Spain) Jordi Valls	AJR		32	Ret	DNS	Ret			0
	(Russia) Alexey Ivanov	FTR	DNS	Ret						0
	(France) Grégory Di Carlo	Suter				DNS	Ret			0
	(Spain) Angel Molero	Ariane	Ret							0
	(Spain) Antonio Gallardo	Bottpower	Ret							0
	(Spain) Javier Sanchez	MIR Racing					Ret			0
	(Spain) Sergio Fuertes	AJR			DNS					
Pos.	Rider	Bike	JER 1 (Spain)	ARA (Spain)	CAT (Spain)	ALB 1 (Spain)	ALB 2 (Spain)	VAL (Spain)	JER 2 (Spain)	Pts

Colour	Result
Gold	Winner
Silver	Second place
Bronze	Third place
Green	Points classification
Blue	Non-points classification
Blue	Non-classified finish (NC)
Purple	Retired, not classified (Ret)
Red	Did not qualify (DNQ)
Red	Did not pre-qualify (DNPQ)
Black	Disqualified (DSQ)
White	Did not start (DNS)
White	Withdrew (WD)
White	Race cancelled (C)
Blank	Did not practice (DNP)
Blank	Did not arrive (DNA)
Blank	Excluded (EX)

P – Pole position
F – Fastest lap
