= 2010 CEV Moto2 season =

Inaugural season of the CEV Moto2 season

2010 FIM CEV Moto2 European Championship
Previous:	none	Next:	2011

The 2010 FIM CEV Moto2 European Championship was the inaugural season of the CEV Moto2 season. The season was held over 7 races at 7 meetings, beginning on 18 April at Circuit de Barcelona-Catalunya and finished on 21 November at Circuito de Jerez. Carmelo Morales won the title after beating closest rival Jordi Torres by 10 points.

== Calendar ==
2010 Calendar
Round	Date	Circuit	Pole position	Fastest lap	Race winner	Winning constructor
1	18 April	(Spain) Catalunya	(Spain) Jordi Torres	(Spain) Carmelo Morales	(Spain) Jordi Torres	Harris
2	9 May	(Spain) Albacete 1	(Spain) Carmelo Morales	(Spain) Carmelo Morales	(United Kingdom) Kev Coghlan	FTR
3	13 June	(Spain) Jerez 1	(Spain) Carmelo Morales	(United Kingdom) Kev Coghlan	(Spain) Carmelo Morales	LRT Suter
4	11 July	(Spain) Aragón	(Spain) Jordi Torres	(Spain) Iván Moreno	(United Kingdom) Kev Coghlan	FTR
5	12 September	(Spain) Albacete 2	(Spain) Carmelo Morales	(Spain) Carmelo Morales	(Spain) Carmelo Morales	LRT Suter
6	14 November	(Spain) Valencia	(Spain) Carmelo Morales	(Spain) Axel Pons	(Spain) Carmelo Morales	LRT Suter
7	21 November	(Spain) Jerez 2	(Spain) Carmelo Morales	(Spain) Iván Silva	(Spain) Axel Pons	Kalex

== Entry list ==
Team	Constructor	No.	Rider	Rounds
(Spain) E De Competición Pablete M2	AJR	19	(Spain) Pablo Barrio	1–4
(Spain) Illusion Team	AJR	88	(Spain) Amadeo LLados	1
(Spain) ITJ	AJR	12	(Spain) Fran Rodríguez	6–7
(Spain) Llados Racing Team	AJR	88	(Spain) Amadeo Llados	2–7
(Spain) Motorrad Competición	AJR	8	(Spain) Sergio Fuertes	5
(Spain) Motorrad Competición	AJR	8	(Spain) Daniel Arcas	6–7
(Spain) Motorrad Competición	AJR	17	(Spain) Antonio Gallardo	1–4
(Spain) Motorrad Competición	AJR	27	(Spain) Russell Gómez	1–5
(Spain) Motorrad Competición	AJR	34	(Brazil) Nicolás Felipe	7
(Spain) Motorrad Competición	AJR	46	(Spain) Javier Forés	6
(Spain) Red-Racing	AJR	6	(Spain) Carla Calderer	4–5
(Spain) TT World Team	AJR	26	(Spain) Juan David López	2, 6–7
(Spain) Holiday Gym Racing	Arbizu GP	13	(Belgium) Xavier Simeon	1
(Spain) Arbizu GP	Arbizu GP	75	(Spain) David Vázquez	2–3
(Spain) Bottpower Medes	Bottpower	32	(Spain) Alejandro Martínez	6–7
(Spain) Hune Racing Tea	BQR	52	(Spain) José David de Gea	1–4
(France) JEG	Caretta TEC	65	(Argentina) Martin Solorza	1–2
(France) Team Duterne Racing	Duterne Racing	93	(France) Stéphane Duterne	2
(Spain) Olive Racing	Else	29	(Spain) Julia Olivé	1–2, 4
(United Kingdom) JMW FOGI Racing	FTR	5	(United Kingdom) Ian Lowry	1–2
(United Kingdom) SMP	FTR	61	(Russia) Alexey Ivanov	1–4, 6–7
(Italy) Team Amalgama	FTR	73	(Italy) Federico D'Annunzio	6–7
(Spain) Team Monlau Competición	FTR	54	(United Kingdom) Kev Coghlan	All
(Italy) Grillini PBR Team	GAPAM 201	69	(Italy) Gianluca Nannelli	All
(Spain) GPE La Selva Circuit	GPE	6	(Spain) Carla Calderer	2
(Spain) GPE La Selva Circuit	GPE	8	(Spain) Daniel Arcas	1–2
(Spain) H 43 Team Hernandez	H 43	43	(Spain) Manuel Hernández	5, 7
(Spain) H 43 Team Hernandez	H 43	76	(Spain) Luis Miguel Mora	1–4, 6–7
(Spain) MR Griful	Harris	7	(Spain) Dani Rivas	All
(Spain) MR Griful	Harris	9	(Spain) Jordi Torres	All
(Spain) Inerzia Inmotec	Inmotec	22	(Spain) Iván Silva	All
(Spain) Inerzia Inmotec	Inmotec	37	(Spain) Hugo Martínez	1–6
(Spain) Inerzia Inmotec	Inmotec	99	(France) Lucas Mahias	7
Grand Prix Team Switzerland	Kalex	35	(Switzerland) Randy Krummenacher	7
(Spain) Tenerife 40 Pons	Kalex	80	(Spain) Axel Pons	6–7
(Spain) Gigaset Laglisse	LRT Suter	4	(Spain) Ricard Cardús	1–5
(Spain) Gigaset Laglisse	LRT Suter	4	(Malaysia) Hafizh Syahrin	6
(Spain) Gigaset Laglisse	LRT Suter	31	(Spain) Carmelo Morales	All
(Spain) Gigaset Laglisse	LRT Suter	37	(Spain) Hugo Martínez	7
(Spain) Gigaset Laglisse	LRT Suter	38	(Spain) Jorge Castellanos	All
(Spain) Gigaset Laglisse	LRT Suter	92	(Colombia) Santiago Hernández	All
(Spain) MIR Racing	MIR Racing	16	(Spain) Óscar Climent	All
(Spain) MIR Racing	MIR Racing	40	(Spain) Román Ramos	All
(Spain) MIR Racing	MIR Racing	84	(Spain) Julián Miralles	1–2
(Spain) Team Bernat	MIR Racing	78	(Spain) Bernat Martínez	5–7
(Spain) Andalucia Canjasol	Moriwaki	21	(Spain) Iván Moreno	All
(Spain) Holiday Gym Racing	Moriwaki	13	(Belgium) Xavier Simeon	2, 7
(Spain) Holiday Gym Racing	Moriwaki	89	(Spain) Yannick Guerra	7
(Germany) MZ Racing Team	MZ–RE Honda	23	(Germany) Toni Wirsing	7
(Germany) IAMT Factory Team	RP2	14	(United Kingdom) Marc Moser	6–7
(Germany) IAMT Factory Team	RP2	20	(South Africa) Matthew Scholtz	6–7
(Spain) A&R Racing Team	RSV	18	(Australia) Mark Aitchison	1
(Spain) A&R Racing Team	RSV	43	(Spain) Manuel Hernández	2–4
(Spain) Argoinser Competición	SR–7	44	(Spain) Javier Alviz	7
(France) Binoche Racing Team	SR–7	51	(France) Renaud Binoche	1, 3–6
(Spain) TMR–La Bruixa D'Or	SR–7	15	(Spain) Jonathan Alabarce	4–5
(Spain) TMR–La Bruixa D'Or	SR–7	72	(Spain) Jaume Ferrer	1–4
(Spain) TMR–La Bruixa D'Or	SR–7	81	(Italy) Christopher Moretti	1–3
(France) EQ.FRA.Vit.Espoir FF	Suter	60	(France) Stéphane Egea	6
(Italy) Matteoni Racing Team	Suter	81	(Italy) Christopher Moretti	4–5
(Qatar) QMMF	Suter	95	(Qatar) Sultan Al Naimi	3–4
(Qatar) QMMF	Suter	96	(Qatar) Nasser Al Malki	4

== Championship standings ==
Pos.	Rider	Bike	CAT (Spain)	ALB 1 (Spain)	JER 1 (Spain)	ARA (Spain)	ALB 2 (Spain)	VAL (Spain)	JER 2 (Spain)	Pts
1	(Spain) Carmelo Morales	LRT Suter	19^{F}	2^{P} ^{F}	1^{P}	6	1^{P} ^{F}	1^{P}	7^{P}	114
2	(Spain) Jordi Torres	Harris	1^{P}	6	Ret	3^{P}	2	4	2	104
3	(United Kingdom) Kev Coghlan	FTR	6	1	DSQ^{F}	1	4	5	8	92
4	(Spain) Dani Rivas	Harris	2	3	2	7	8	8	6	91
5	(Spain) Román Ramos	MIR Racing	8	11	5	4	3	3	3	85
6	(Spain) Iván Moreno	Moriwaki	3	8	3	2^{F}	Ret	15	9	68
7	(Spain) Iván Silva	Inmotec	Ret	4	Ret	5	7	7	4^{F}	55
8	(Spain) Ricard Cardús	LRT Suter	4	5	4	Ret	5			48
9	(Spain) Axel Pons	Kalex						2^{F}	1	45
10	(Italy) Gianluca Nannelli	GAPAM 201	11	12	6	9	11	Ret	12	35
11	(Spain) Russell Gómez	AJR	10	9	Ret	8	6			31
12	(Spain) José David de Gea	BQR	5	7	7	Ret				29
13	(Spain) Manuel Hernández	RSV		Ret	9	11				24
13	(Spain) Manuel Hernández	H 43					10		10	24
14	(Spain) Jorge Castellanos	LRT Suter	12	17	8	10	12	16	24	22
15	(Colombia) Santiago Hernández	LRT Suter	17	10	13	Ret	Ret	9	11	21
16	(Spain) Amadeo Llados	AJR	15	Ret	10	13	14	14	13	17
17	(Spain) Óscar Climent	MIR Racing	Ret	Ret	11	12	13	12	17	16
18	(Spain) Daniel Arcas	GPE	9	Ret						13
18	(Spain) Daniel Arcas	AJR						10	Ret	13
19	(Switzerland) Randy Krummenacher	Kalex							5	11
20	(Spain) Javier Forés	AJR						6		10
21	(Australia) Mark Aitchison	RSV	7							9
22	(Spain) Bernat Martínez	MIR Racing					9	Ret	Ret	7
23	(Italy) Federico D'Annunzio	FTR						11	19	5
24	(Spain) Hugo Martínez	Inmotec	Ret	15	12	Ret	Ret	Ret		5
24	(Spain) Hugo Martínez	LRT Suter							21	5
25	(South Africa) Matthew Scholtz	RP2						13	14	5
26	(Spain) Antonio Gallardo	AJR	Ret	13	Ret	14				5
27	(Italy) Christopher Moretti	SR–7	13	Ret	Ret					3
27	(Italy) Christopher Moretti	Suter				Ret	16			3
28	(Qatar) Sultan Al Naimi	Suter			14	Ret				2
29	(Spain) Julián Miralles	MIR Racing	Ret	14						2
30	(Belgium) Xavier Simeon	Arbizu GP	14							2
30	(Belgium) Xavier Simeon	Moriwaki		Ret					Ret	2
31	(Brazil) Nicolás Felipe	AJR							15	1
32	(Qatar) Nasser Al Malki	Suter				15				1
33	(Spain) Luis Miguel Mora	H 43	21	18	15	Ret		Ret	Ret	1
34	(Spain) Jonathan Alabarce	SR–7				Ret	15			1
	(Argentina) Martin Solorza	Caretta TEC	16	16						0
	(Spain) Yannick Guerra	Moriwaki							16	0
	(Spain) Carla Calderer	GPE		24						0
	(Spain) Carla Calderer	AJR				16	18			0
	(Russia) Alexey Ivanov	FTR	DNQ	22	16	Ret		Ret	25	0
	(France) Renaud Binoche	SR–7	DNQ		18	Ret	17	DNS		0
	(United Kingdom) Marc Moser	RP2						17	23	0
	(Spain) David Vázquez	Arbizu GP		Ret	17					0
	(France) Lucas Mahias	Inmotec							18	0
	(Malaysia) Hafizh Syahrin	LRT Suter						18		0
	(Spain) Jaume Ferrer	SR–7	18	19	Ret	Ret				0
	(Spain) Pablo Barrio	AJR	20	25	19	DNQ				0
	(Spain) Juan David López	AJR		23				19	DNS	0
	(France) Stéphane Duterne	Duterne Racing		20						0
	(Spain) Alejandro Martínez	Bottpower						Ret	20	0
	(Spain) Julia Olivé	Else	22	21		DNS				0
	(Germany) Toni Wirsing	MZ–RE Honda							22	0
	(Spain) Fran Rodríguez	AJR						Ret	26	0
	(Spain) Javier Alviz	SR–7							27	0
	(France) Stéphane Egea	Suter						Ret		0
	(Spain) Sergio Fuertes	AJR					Ret			0
	(United Kingdom) Ian Lowry	FTR	Ret	Ret						0
Pos.	Rider	Bike	CAT (Spain)	ALB 1 (Spain)	JER 1 (Spain)	ARA (Spain)	ALB 2 (Spain)	VAL (Spain)	JER 2 (Spain)	Pts

Colour	Result
Gold	Winner
Silver	Second place
Bronze	Third place
Green	Points classification
Blue	Non-points classification
Blue	Non-classified finish (NC)
Purple	Retired, not classified (Ret)
Red	Did not qualify (DNQ)
Red	Did not pre-qualify (DNPQ)
Black	Disqualified (DSQ)
White	Did not start (DNS)
White	Withdrew (WD)
White	Race cancelled (C)
Blank	Did not practice (DNP)
Blank	Did not arrive (DNA)
Blank	Excluded (EX)

P – Pole position
F – Fastest lap
