= 2015 FIM CEV Superbike European Championship =

2015 FIM CEV Superbike European Championship
Previous:	2014	Next:	2016
Support series: FIM CEV Moto3 Junior World Championship; FIM CEV Moto2 European Championship

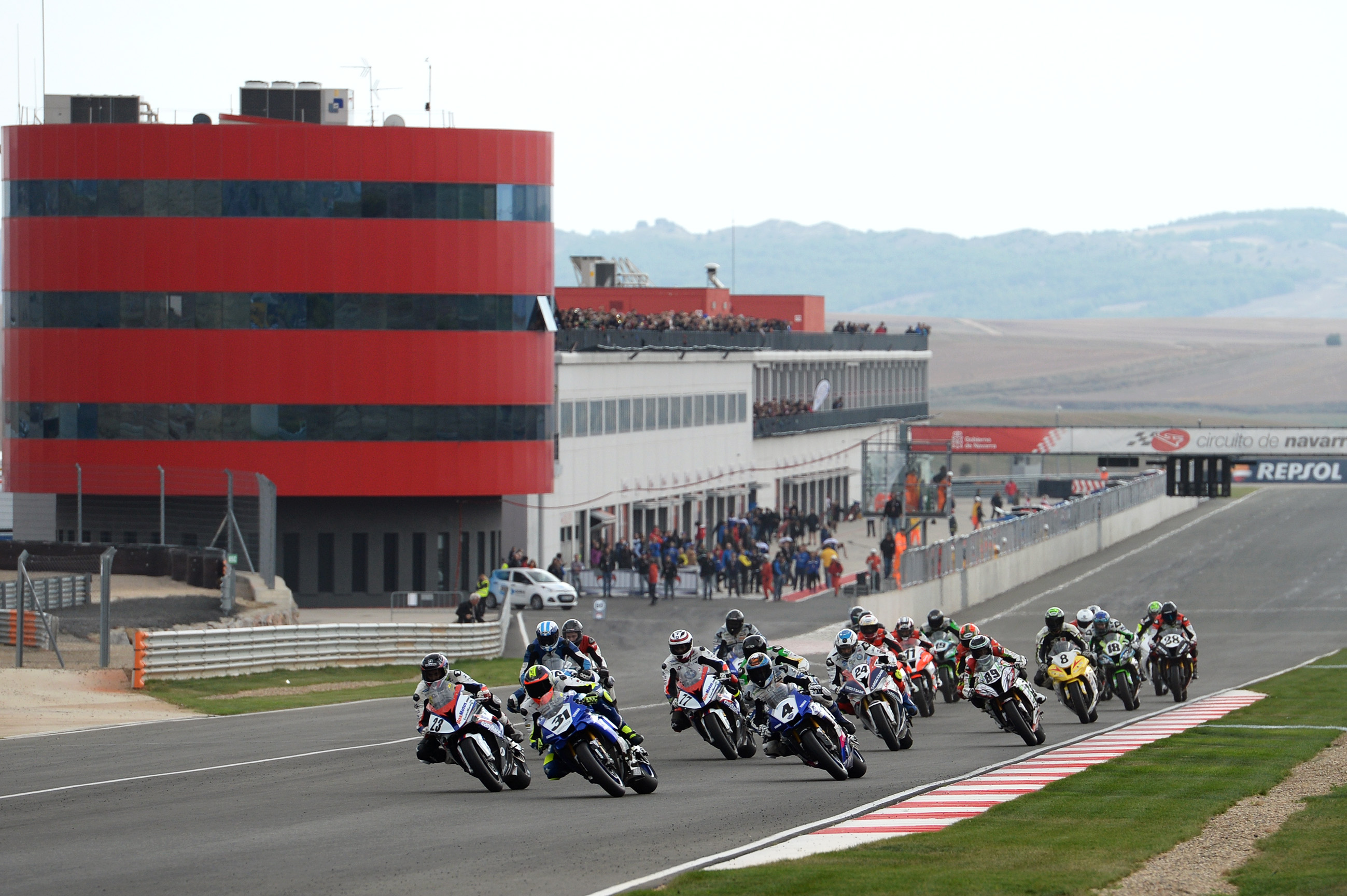
The start of the race at Circuito de Navarra

The 2015 FIM CEV Superbike European Championship was the second season of the Superbike European Championship series. The season was held over 11 races at 7 meetings, beginning on 26 April at Algarve and finished on 15 November at Valencia.

Spaniard Carmelo Morales won the title after beating closest rival Adrián Bonastre.

== Race calendar and results ==
Round	Date	Circuit	Pole position	Fastest lap	Winning rider	Winning team	Winning constructor
1	26 April	(Portugal) Algarve International Circuit	(Spain) Carmelo Morales	(Spain) Carmelo Morales	(United States) Kenny Noyes	Kawasaki Palmeto PL Racing	Kawasaki
1	26 April	(Portugal) Algarve International Circuit	(Spain) Carmelo Morales	(United States) Kenny Noyes	(Spain) Carmelo Morales	Yamaha Laglisse	Yamaha
2	21 June	(Spain) Circuit de Barcelona-Catalunya	(Spain) Carmelo Morales	(Spain) Carmelo Morales	(Spain) Carmelo Morales	Yamaha Laglisse	Yamaha
3	5 July	(Spain) MotorLand Aragón	(Spain) Dani Rivas	(Spain) Carmelo Morales	(Spain) Carmelo Morales	Yamaha Laglisse	Yamaha
4	6 September	(Spain) Circuito de Albacete	(Spain) Carmelo Morales	(Spain) Carmelo Morales	(Spain) Iván Silva	Targobank Motorsport	BMW
4	6 September	(Spain) Circuito de Albacete	(Spain) Carmelo Morales	(Spain) Iván Silva	(Spain) Carmelo Morales	Yamaha Laglisse	Yamaha
5	4 October	(Spain) Circuito de Navarra	(Spain) Carmelo Morales	(Venezuela) Robertino Pietri	(Venezuela) Robertino Pietri	Team Stratos	Yamaha
5	4 October	(Spain) Circuito de Navarra	(Spain) Carmelo Morales	(Spain) Carmelo Morales	(Spain) Carmelo Morales	Yamaha Laglisse	Yamaha
6	1 November	(Spain) Circuito de Jerez	(Spain) Carmelo Morales	(Chile) Maximilian Scheib	(Spain) Carmelo Morales	Yamaha Laglisse	Yamaha
6	1 November	(Spain) Circuito de Jerez	(Spain) Carmelo Morales	(Spain) Carmelo Morales	(Spain) Carmelo Morales	Yamaha Laglisse	Yamaha
7	15 November	(Spain) Circuit Ricardo Tormo	(Venezuela) Robertino Pietri	(Spain) Carmelo Morales	(Spain) Carmelo Morales	Yamaha Laglisse	Yamaha

== Entry list ==
Team	Constructor	No.	Rider	Rounds
(Spain) H43 Team – TMP Racing Sport	Aprilia	58	(Denmark) Michael Møller Pedersen	All
(France) Ducatimo S.A.	Ducati	17	(Luxembourg) Thierry Mulot	6–7
(France) JEG Racing	Ducati	66	(France) Philippe Le Gallo	1–5
(Norway) Plassen Roadracing Team	Ducati	65	(Norway) Ole Bjørn Plassen	1–4, 6
(Spain) Garrote Racing Team	Bimota	28	(Spain) Javier Prieto	5
(Spain) RTM	Bimota	2	(Spain) Erik Morillas	4–5
(Spain) Boxmotos.com Easyrace SBK Team	BMW	7	(Spain) Dani Rivas	1–3
(Spain) Boxmotos.com Easyrace SBK Team	BMW	23	(Spain) Adrián Bonastre	All
(Spain) Boxmotos.com Easyrace SBK Team	BMW	77	(Chile) Maximilian Scheib	5–7
Czech Republic	BMW	74	(Czech Republic) Kamil Holán	6
(Spain) Egues-Skull	BMW	35	(Spain) Mario Peru	5
(Finland) Motomarket Racing	BMW	5	(Finland) Eeki Kuparinen	All
(Finland) Motomarket Racing	BMW	75	(Finland) Mika Höglund	2–3
(Portugal) Rlperformance58	BMW	88	(Portugal) Ricardo Lopes	1–2, 4
(Spain) Stratos Racing Team	BMW	75	(Finland) Mika Höglund	5–7
(Spain) Targobank Motorsport	BMW	22	(Spain) Iván Silva	1–4
(Spain) Targobank Motorsport	BMW	24	(Spain) Miguel Poyatos	5–7
(Switzerland) Team Motos Vionnet	BMW	34	(Switzerland) Thomas Toffel	6
(Switzerland) Team Motos Vionnet	BMW	51	(Switzerland) Eric Vionnet	6
(Sweden) 32 Racing	Honda	32	(Sweden) Jari Tuovinen	7
(Spain) AE19 SBK Team	Kawasaki	3/19	(Spain) Alejandro Esteban	1–2, 4–7
(Spain) Alba Racing Motor sport	Kawasaki	64	(Spain) Raúl Martínez	1–4, 6–7
(France) Ecurie Berga	Kawasaki	8	(France) Jonathan Hardt	All
(France) Ecurie Berga	Kawasaki	77	(France) Mickael Morin	2–3
(France) JEG Racing; JEG Racing S.L.U.	Kawasaki	6	(France) Juan Eric Gomez	3
(France) JEG Racing; JEG Racing S.L.U.	Kawasaki	43	(Canada) Chris Cotton-Russell	All
(France) JEG Racing; JEG Racing S.L.U.	Kawasaki	49	(France) Fabien Parchard	1
(France) JEG Racing; JEG Racing S.L.U.	Kawasaki	66	(France) Philippe Le Gallo	6
(France) JEG Racing; JEG Racing S.L.U.	Kawasaki	90	(Spain) Javier Alviz	7
(Spain) Kawasaki Palmeto PL Racing	Kawasaki	1	(United States) Kenny Noyes	1–3
(Spain) Kawasaki Palmeto PL Racing	Kawasaki	18	(Spain) Lucas De Ulacia	All
(Spain) Kawasaki Palmeto PL Racing	Kawasaki	55	(Argentina) Marcos Solorza	4–5
(Spain) Olias Racing Team	Kawasaki	69	(Spain) Juan Mari Olias	5
Qatar Racing Team	Kawasaki	95/11	(Qatar) Saeed Al Sulaiti	All
Qatar Racing Team	Kawasaki	95	(Qatar) Mashel Al Naimi	2–7
(France) Team CMS	Kawasaki	89	(France) Axel Maurin	All
(France) TEX Racing	Kawasaki	46	(France) Pierre Texier	All
(Spain) Alonso Competicion Team Mora Eni	Suzuki	20	(Spain) Juan Antonio Alonso	1–3, 6
(Spain) Team Stratos	Yamaha	4	(Venezuela) Robertino Pietri	All
(Spain) Team Stratos	Yamaha	33	(Finland) Niko Mäkinen	All
(Spain) Yamaha Laglisse	Yamaha	31	(Spain) Carmelo Morales	All

Key
Regular rider
Wildcard rider
Replacement rider

== Championship' standings ==
Points were awarded to the top fifteen riders, provided the rider finished the race.

Position	1st	2nd	3rd	4th	5th	6th	7th	8th	9th	10th	11th	12th	13th	14th	15th
Points	25	20	16	13	11	10	9	8	7	6	5	4	3	2	1

Pos.	Rider	Constructor	POR (Portugal)		BAR (Spain)	ARA (Spain)	ALB (Spain)		NAV (Spain)		JER (Spain)		VAL (Spain)	Pts
1	(Spain) Carmelo Morales	Yamaha	2^{PF}	1^{P}	1^{PF}	1^{F}	4^{PF}	1^{P}	3^{P}	1^{PF}	1^{P}	1^{PF}	1^{F}	249
2	(Spain) Adrián Bonastre	BMW	9	11	4	5	2	3	12	2	4	3	3	141
3	(Venezuela) Robertino Pietri	Yamaha	3	3	Ret	4	5	4	1^{F}	3	9	5	Ret^{P}	128
4	(Spain) Iván Silva	BMW	4	4	2	3	1	2^{F}						107
5	(Finland) Eeki Kuparinen	BMW	8	10	6	6	6	7	8	7	7	8	9	94
6	(France) Pierre Texier	Kawasaki	7	6	7	7	7	8	21	5	11	9	8	85
7	(Chile) Maximilian Scheib	BMW							2	Ret	2^{F}	2	2	80
8	(France) Axel Maurin	Kawasaki	6	7	5	9	Ret	6	17	10	Ret	7	7	71
9	(Spain) Miguel Poyatos	BMW							7	4	3	4	4	64
10	(United States) Kenny Noyes	Kawasaki	1	2^{F}	3	DNS								61
11	(Qatar) Mashel Al Naimi	Kawasaki			8	10	3	5	19	8	12	13	11	61
12	(France) Jonathan Hardt	KAwasaki	10	9	Ret	8	11	11	14	Ret	5	10	WD	50
13	(Spain) Dani Rivas	BMW	5	5	9	2^{P}								49
14	(Qatar) Saeed Al Sulaiti	Kawasaki	16	15	13	13	12	Ret	18	9	8	6	6	46
15	(Spain) Lucas De Ulacia	Kawasaki	12	13	15	16	Ret	14	4	13	Ret	11	10	37
16	(Spain) Alejandro Esteban	Kawasaki	11	12	10		13	Ret	20	12	6	Ret	13	35
17	(Finland) Niko Mäkinen	Yamaha	17	17	12	14	10	12	13	15	10	12	Ret	34
18	(Argentina) Marcos Solorza	Kawasaki					8	9	9	6				32
19	(Canada) Chris Cotton-Russell	Kawasaki	14	14	14	15	9	Ret	6	15	13	16	12	32
20	(Spain) Raúl Martínez	Kawasaki	Ret	19	11	11	Ret	13			15	15	14	17
21	(Norway) Ole Bjørn Plassen	Ducati	Ret	8	Ret	Ret	Ret	10			DNQ	DNQ		14
22	(Spain) Javier Prieto	Bimota							5	16				11
23	(Spain) Javier Alviz	Kawasaki											5	11
24	(Spain) Juan Mari Olias	Kawasaki							10	14				8
25	(Denmark) Michael Møller Pedersen	Aprilia	13	18	17	17	14	16	15	17	14	Ret	16	8
26	(Spain) Mario Peru	BMW							11	18				5
27	(France) Juan Eric Gomez	Kawasaki				12								4
28	(Switzerland) Eric Vionnet	BMW									DNS	14		2
29	(France) Fabien Parchard	Kawasaki	15	16										1
30	(Portugal) Ricardo Lopes	BMW	18	21	20		15	17						1
31	(Spain) Erik Morillas	Bimota					Ret	15	16	Ret				1
32	(Luxembourg) Thierry Mulot	Ducati									Ret	Ret	15	1
	(France) Mickael Morin	Kawasaki			16	18								0
	(France) Philippe Le Gallo	Ducati	20	22	Ret	20	16	18	DNQ	DNQ				0
	(France) Philippe Le Gallo	Kawasaki									DNQ	DNQ		0
	(Czech Republic) Kamil Holán	BMW									16	Ret		0
	(Spain) Juan Antonio Alonso	Suzuki	19	20	18	Ret					17	Ret		0
	(Switzerland) Thomas Toffel	BMW									19	17		0
	(Finland) Mika Höglund	BMW			19	19			Ret	19	18	Ret	17	0
	(Sweden) Jari Tuovinen	Honda											Ret	0
Pos.	Rider	Constructor	POR (Portugal)		BAR (Spain)	ARA (Spain)	ALB (Spain)		NAV (Spain)		JER (Spain)		VAL (Spain)	Points

Colour	Result
Gold	Winner
Silver	Second place
Bronze	Third place
Green	Points finish
Blue	Non-points finish
Blue	Non-classified finish (NC)
Purple	Retired (Ret)
Red	Did not qualify (DNQ)
Red	Did not pre-qualify (DNPQ)
Black	Disqualified (DSQ)
White	Did not start (DNS)
White	Withdrew (WD)
White	Race cancelled (C)
Blank	Did not practice (DNP)
Blank	Did not arrive (DNA)
Blank	Excluded (EX)

P – Pole position
F – Fastest lap
