= 2014 FIM CEV Superbike European Championship =

2014 FIM CEV Superbike European Championship
Previous:	2013 (Superstock Extreme)	Next:	2015
Support series: FIM CEV Moto3 International Championship; FIM CEV Moto2 European Championship

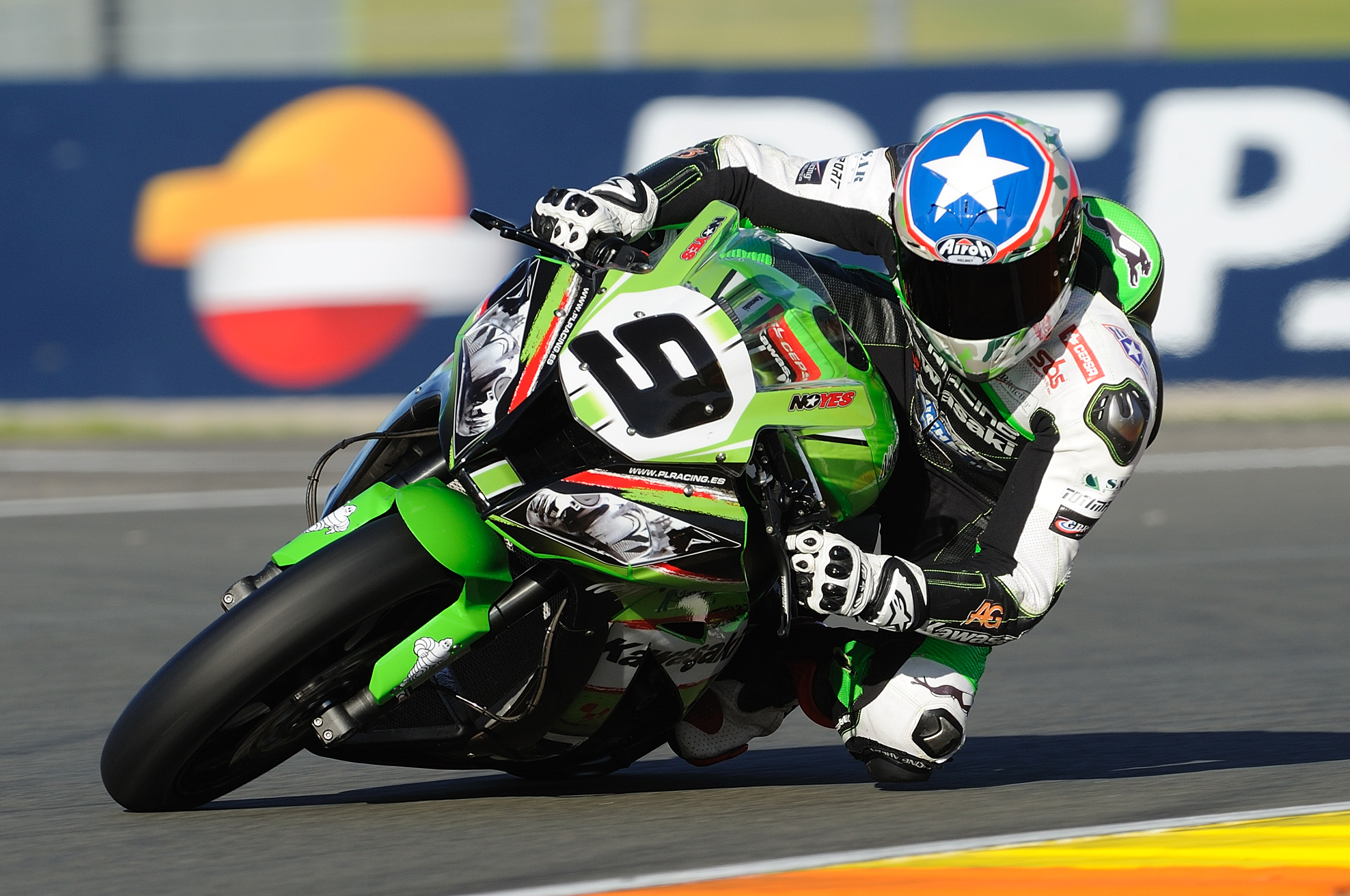
Kenny Noyes at Ricardo Tormo Circuit

The 2014 FIM CEV Superbike European Championship was the inaugural season of the Superbike European Championship series.The series replacing the old CEV Superstock Extreme class after 12 years.

American Kenny Noyes was crowned as the champion after beating closest rival Carmelo Morales.

== Race calendar and results ==
The provisional calendar was announced in November 2013.

Round	Date	Circuit	Pole position	Fastest lap	Winning rider	Winning team	Winning constructor
1	6 April	(Spain) Circuito de Jerez	(United States) Kenny Noyes	(Spain) Carmelo Morales	(Spain) Carmelo Morales	Calvo Team	Kawasaki
2	8 June	(Spain) MotorLand Aragón	(United States) Kenny Noyes	(United States) Kenny Noyes	(United States) Kenny Noyes	Kawasaki Palmeto PL Racing	Kawasaki
2	8 June	(Spain) MotorLand Aragón	(United States) Kenny Noyes	(United States) Kenny Noyes	(United States) Kenny Noyes	Kawasaki Palmeto PL Racing	Kawasaki
3	22 June	(Spain) Circuit de Barcelona-Catalunya	(United States) Kenny Noyes	(Spain) Carmelo Morales	(United States) Kenny Noyes	Kawasaki Palmeto PL Racing	Kawasaki
4	6 July	(Spain) Circuito de Albacete	(Spain) Ángel Rodríguez	(Spain) Iván Silva	(Spain) Ángel Rodríguez	Suzuki Speed Racing	Suzuki
4	6 July	(Spain) Circuito de Albacete	(Spain) Ángel Rodríguez	(Spain) Ángel Rodríguez	(Spain) Iván Silva	Targobank Motorsport	BMW
5	7 September	(Spain) Circuito de Navarra	(Spain) Carmelo Morales	(Spain) Carmelo Morales	(Spain) Carmelo Morales	Calvo Team	Kawasaki
6	2 November	(Portugal) Algarve International Circuit	(Spain) Carmelo Morales	(Spain) Carmelo Morales	(Spain) Carmelo Morales	Calvo Team	Kawasaki
6	2 November	(Portugal) Algarve International Circuit	(Spain) Carmelo Morales	(Spain) Carmelo Morales	(Spain) Carmelo Morales	Calvo Team	Kawasaki
7	16 November	(Spain) Circuit Ricardo Tormo	(Spain) Santiago Barragán	(Norway) Ole Plassen	(Spain) Carmelo Morales	Calvo Team	Kawasaki

== Entry list ==
Team	Constructor	No.	Rider	Rounds
(Spain) H43 Team – TMP Racing Sport	Aprilia	58	(Denmark) Michael Møller Pedersen	All
(Belgium) Alstare Junior Team	Bimota	25	(France) Christophe Ponsson	1–4
(Spain) Borrajo Racing Team	BMW	76	(Spain) Oscar Borrajo	5
(Spain) Easyrace Superbike Team	BMW	7	(Spain) Dani Rivas	All
(Spain) Easyrace Superbike Team	BMW	73	(Spain) Mauro Gonzalez	7
(Spain) Extremadura Competicion Vrya	BMW	91	(Spain) Raul Gomez	1
(Spain) Flat Out – Stratos	BMW	17	(Spain) Cesar Tomé Sanmartín	1, 7
(Spain) Flat Out – Stratos	BMW	24	(Spain) Javier Moreno	1, 7
(Spain) Hospitality Motobox	BMW	11	(Spain) Jorge Sastre	7
(France) L'Aspi Racing	BMW	39	(France) Nicolas Pouhair	7
(Portugal) Mario Alves 79	BMW	79	(Portugal) Mario Alves	6
(Finland) Motomarket Racing	BMW	5	(Finland) Eeki Kuparinen	All
(Finland) Motomarket Racing	BMW	75	(Finland) Mika Höglund	5–7
(Switzerland) Motos Vionnet	BMW	2	(Switzerland) Sébastien Suchet	7
(Switzerland) Motos Vionnet	BMW	53	(Switzerland) Eric Vionnet	7
(Finland) Nikoracing – Stratos	BMW	33	(Finland) Niko Mäkinen	All
(Portugal) Ricardo Lopes	BMW	48	(Portugal) Ricardo Lopes	6
(Spain) Super7moto.com-BMW Racing Team	BMW	35	(Spain) Antonio Alarcos	7
(Spain) Super7moto.com-BMW Racing Team	BMW	55	(Spain) Alberto Serrano	7
(Spain) Targobank Motorsport; BMW Motorsprort Targo Bank	BMW	22	(Spain) Iván Silva	All
(Spain) Targobank Motorsport; BMW Motorsprort Targo Bank	BMW	87	(Spain) Raúl García	1–3
(Spain) Targobank Motorsport; BMW Motorsprort Targo Bank	BMW	93	(Spain) Daniel Torreño	7
(Italy) Team GoPro	BMW	40	(Italy) Massimiliano Chetry	3
(Norway) Plassen Roadracing Team	Ducati	65	(Norway) Ole Bjørn Plassen	7
(United Kingdom) Callmac/Linbrooke; Quelch Afterdark Motorsport	Honda	8/80	(United Kingdom) Craig Neve	1–3, 5
(Spain) AE19 Basolí Competició; Basolí Competició	Kawasaki	3	(Spain) Alejandro Esteban	1–3, 5–7
(Spain) AE19 Basolí Competició; Basolí Competició	Kawasaki	49	(France) Fabien Parchard	1–5
(Spain) AE19 Basolí Competició; Basolí Competició	Kawasaki	90	(Spain) Javier Alviz	6
(Spain) Alba Racing Motor Sport	Kawasaki	64	(Spain) Raúl Martínez	1–4
(France) ASPI Racing	Kawasaki	69	(France) Bergeron Lionel	7
(Spain) Calvo Team	Kawasaki	31	(Spain) Carmelo Morales	1–3, 5–7
(France) Cheroy Motos Sport	Kawasaki	89	(France) Maurin Axel	6
(France) Dumas Racing Team	Kawasaki	99	(France) Mathieu Dumas	1–4, 6–7
(Spain) FG Gubellini	Kawasaki	88	(Spain) Juan Mari Olias	1
(Spain) FG Gubellini	Kawasaki	93	(Spain) Daniel Torreño	1
(Portugal) Guerrero Racing Team	Kawasaki	29	(Portugal) Tiago Magalhães	1, 6
(Spain) Hospitality Motobox	Kawasaki	11/23	(Spain) Guillermo Llano	All
(France) JEG Racing; JEG Racing S.L.U	Kawasaki	6	(France) Juan Eric Gomez	7
(France) JEG Racing; JEG Racing S.L.U	Kawasaki	43	(Canada) Chris Cotton-Russell	All
(France) JEG Racing; JEG Racing S.L.U	Kawasaki	66	(France) Philippe Le Gallo	1–6
(Spain) Kawasaki Palmeto PL Racing	Kawasaki	4	(Venezuela) Robertino Pietri	All
(Spain) Kawasaki Palmeto PL Racing	Kawasaki	9	(United States) Kenny Noyes	All
(Spain) Kawasaki Palmeto PL Racing	Kawasaki	18	(Spain) Lucas De Ulacia	All
(United Kingdom) MSG Racing UK	Kawasaki	19	(United Kingdom) Ryan Gibson	1, 7
(Spain) Otis Racing Team	Kawasaki	63	(Spain) Oscar Martinez	3
(Spain) Pastrana Racing Team	Kawasaki	10	(Spain) Enrique Ferrer	1–5
(Spain) Pastrana Racing Team	Kawasaki	40	(Spain) Román Ramos	7
(United Kingdom) Quelch Afterdark	Kawasaki	26	(United Kingdom) Josh Wainwright	1–6
(United Kingdom) Quelch Afterdark	Kawasaki	28	(United Kingdom) Niel Gregory	6–7
(Qatar) QMMF Racing Team	Kawasaki	95	(Qatar) Saeed Al Sulaiti	7
(Spain) Team Aparicio-Box Extremo	Kawasaki	6	(Spain) Andres Francisco Aparicio	1
(Spain) Team IGAX	Kawasaki	32	(Spain) Alejandro Martinez	3, 6–7
(Spain) Team Stratos; Stratos Competicion	Kawasaki	51	(Spain) Santiago Barragán	All
(Spain) Team Stratos; Stratos Competicion	Kawasaki	87	(Spain) Raúl García	4–5
(Spain) Team Torrento	Kawasaki	12	(Spain) Fran Rodriguez	6–7
(France) Tex Racing	Kawasaki	46	(France) Pierre Texier	1–2, 4–7
(France) Martinez Racing Team	Suzuki	21	(France) Jonathan Martinez	2, 7
(United Kingdom) MSG Racing UK	Suzuki	19	(United Kingdom) Ryan Gibson	3
(Portugal) Team SBK/Incortcar	Suzuki	14	(Portugal) André Pires	1
(Spain) Team Suzuki Speed Racing	Suzuki	37	(Spain) Alexander Mateos	All
(Spain) Team Suzuki Speed Racing	Suzuki	47	(Spain) Ángel Rodríguez	All
(Spain) Team Suzuki Speed Racing	Suzuki	94	(Spain) Fran Rodriguez	1–3, 5
(Portugal) Ace Team Anubisnetworks	Yamaha	77	(Portugal) Pedro Monteiro	6

== Championship' standings ==
Points were awarded to the top fifteen riders, provided the rider finished the race.

Position	1st	2nd	3rd	4th	5th	6th	7th	8th	9th	10th	11th	12th	13th	14th	15th
Points	25	20	16	13	11	10	9	8	7	6	5	4	3	2	1

Pos.	Rider	Constructor	JER (Spain)	ARA (Spain)		BAR (Spain)	ALB (Spain)		NAV (Spain)	POR (Portugal)		VAL (Spain)	Pts
1	(United States) Kenny Noyes	Kawasaki	Ret^{P}	1^{PF}	1^{PF}	1^{P}	Ret	4	3	2	3	2	160
2	(Spain) Carmelo Morales	Kawasaki	1^{F}	2	Ret	Ret^{F}			1^{PF}	1^{PF}	1^{PF}	1	145
3	(Spain) Iván Silva	BMW	3	4	3	3	5^{F}	1	3	3	2	Ret	144
4	(Venezuela) Robertino Pietri	Kawasaki	4	5	2	6	3	3	5	4	Ret	3	125
5	(Spain) Santiago Barragán	Kawasaki	2	3	9	5	2	5	2	5	9	Ret^{P}	123
6	(Spain) Dani Rivas	BMW	10	6	Ret	2	4	2	4	6	4	8	113
7	(Spain) Ángel Rodríguez	Suzuki	5	Ret	Ret	4	1^{P}	Ret^{PF}	Ret	Ret	5	5	71
8	(Spain) Enrique Ferrer	Kawasaki	6	10	4	7	6	5	7				58
9	(Finland) Eeki Kuparinen	BMW	7	Ret	5	Ret	14	13	9	10	10	17	44
10	(Spain) Alejandro Esteban	Kawasaki	15	9	7	8			8	11	11	16	43
11	(Spain) Raúl García	BMW	8	7	Ret	DNS							40
11	(Spain) Raúl García	Kawasaki					7	6	12				40
12	(Spain) Alexander Mateos	Suzuki	9	12	19	9	8	10	Ret	18	16	11	37
13	(France) Fabien Parchard	Kawasaki	13	8	6	Ret	12	11	13				33
14	(Spain) Alejandro Martinez	Kawasaki				10				9	6	7	32
15	(Spain) Guillermo Llano	Kawasaki	Ret	16	16	Ret	10	8	10	15	13	10	30
16	(United Kingdom) Josh Wainwright	Kawasaki	11	14	8	Ret	Ret	7	11	Ret	DNS		29
17	(Spain) Raúl Martínez	Kawasaki	12	Ret	10	12	9	14					23
18	(France) Maurin Axel	Kawasaki								7	8		17
19	(Spain) Javier Alviz	Kawasaki								8	7		17
20	(France) Pierre Texier	Kawasaki	Ret	20	14		17	9	Ret	13	15	12	17
21	(Denmark) Michael Møller Pedersen	Aprilia	18	11	11	Ret	11	Ret	14	16	18	19	17
22	(France) Christophe Ponsson	Bimota	17	13	12	11	Ret	12					16
23	(Spain) Román Ramos	Kawasaki										4	13
24	(Norway) Ole Plassen	Ducati										6^{F}	10
25	(France) Mathieu Dumas	Kawasaki	16	Ret	13	Ret	15	18		14	Ret	13	9
26	(Portugal) Tiago Magalhães	Kawasaki	25							12	12		8
27	(Spain) Lucas De Ulacia	Kawasaki	21	17	15	13	13	17	16	21	19	15	8
28	(France) Nicolas Pouhair	BMW										9	7
29	(Canada) Chris Cotton-Russell	Kawasaki	20	Ret	Ret	14	16	16	15	Ret	14	Ret	5
30	(Spain) Andres Francisco Aparicio	Kawasaki	14										2
31	(Spain) Juan Eric Gomez	Kawasaki										14	2
32	(Spain) Fran Rodriguez	Suzuki	Ret	15	Ret	Ret			DNS				1
32	(Spain) Fran Rodriguez	Kawasaki								17	17	20	1
33	(Italy) Massimiliano Chetry	BMW				15							1
	(Finland) Niko Mäkinen	BMW	24	19	18	16	Ret	19	17	22	24	23	0
	(United Kingdom) Craig Neve	Honda	22	18	17	DNS			DNS				0
	(France) Philippe Le Gallo	Kawasaki	Ret	21	20	17	18	20	19	Ret	DNS		0
	(Finland) Mika Höglund	BMW							18	24	Ret	27	0
	(Switzerland) Sébastien Suchet	BMW										18	0
	(Spain) Daniel Torreño	Kawasaki	19										0
	(Spain) Daniel Torreño	BMW										26	0
	(Portugal) Mario Alves	BMW								19	22		0
	(Portugal) Pedro Monteiro	Yamaha								20	21		0
	(Portugal) Ricardo Lopes	BMW								Ret	20		0
	(France) Bergeron Lionel	Kawasaki										21	0
	(Spain) Alberto Serrano	BMW										22	0
	(Portugal) André Pires	Suzuki	23										0
	(United Kingdom) Niel Gregory	Kawasaki								23	23	28	0
	(Spain) Mauro Gonzalez	BMW										24	0
	(Spain) Javier Moreno	BMW	28									25	0
	(Spain) Juan Mari Olias	Kawasaki	26										0
	(Spain) Raul Gomez	BMW	27										0
	(United Kingdom) Ryan Gibson	Kawasaki	29									Ret	0
	(United Kingdom) Ryan Gibson	Suzuki				DNQ							0
	(Spain) Jorge Sastre	BMW										29	0
	(Spain) Cesar Tomé Sanmartín	BMW	Ret									Ret	0
	(France) Jonathan Martinez	Suzuki		Ret	Ret							Ret	0
	(Spain) Oscar Martinez	Kawasaki				Ret							0
	(Spain) Oscar Borrajo	BMW							Ret				0
	(Spain) Antonio Alarcos	BMW										Ret	0
	(Switzerland) Eric Vionnet	BMW										Ret	0
	(Qatar) Saeed Al Sulaiti	Kawasaki										Ret	0
Pos.	Rider	Constructor	JER (Spain)	ARA (Spain)		BAR (Spain)	ALB (Spain)		NAV (Spain)	POR (Portugal)		VAL (Spain)	Points

Colour	Result
Gold	Winner
Silver	Second place
Bronze	Third place
Green	Points classification
Blue	Non-points classification
Blue	Non-classified finish (NC)
Purple	Retired, not classified (Ret)
Red	Did not qualify (DNQ)
Red	Did not pre-qualify (DNPQ)
Black	Disqualified (DSQ)
White	Did not start (DNS)
White	Withdrew (WD)
White	Race cancelled (C)
Blank	Did not practice (DNP)
Blank	Did not arrive (DNA)
Blank	Excluded (EX)

P – Pole position
F – Fastest lap
