= 2013 CEV Superstock Extreme =

2013 CEV Superstock Extreme
Previous:	2012	Next:	2014 (CEV Superbike)
Support series: FIM CEV Moto3 International Championship; FIM CEV Moto2 European Championship

The 2013 CEV Superstock Extreme was the twelfth and final season of the CEV Superstock Extreme. The season was held over 9 races at 7 meetings, beginning on 28 April at the Circuit de Barcelona-Catalunya and finished on 24 November at the Circuito de Jerez.

Xavi Forés won the title after beating closest rival Carmelo Morales.

== Calendar ==
2013 Calendar
Round	Date	Circuit	Pole position	Fastest lap	Race winner	Winning constructor
1	28 April	(Spain) Catalunya	(Spain) Xavi Forés	(Spain) Xavi Forés	(Spain) Xavi Forés	Ducati
2	26 May	(Spain) Aragón	(Spain) Iván Silva	(Spain) Iván Silva	(Spain) Carmelo Morales	Kawasaki
3	23 June	(Spain) Albacete 1	(Spain) Xavi Forés	(Spain) Xavi Forés	(Spain) Xavi Forés	Ducati
4	8 September	(Spain) Albacete 2	(Spain) Xavi Forés	(Spain) Xavi Forés	(Spain) Xavi Forés	Ducati
4	8 September	(Spain) Albacete 2	(Spain) Xavi Forés	(Spain) Xavi Forés	(Spain) Xavi Forés	Ducati
5	22 September	(Spain) Navarra	(Spain) Xavi Forés	(Spain) Carmelo Morales	(Spain) Xavi Forés	Ducati
6	17 November	(Spain) Valencia	(Spain) Carmelo Morales	(Spain) Carmelo Morales	(Spain) Iván Silva	BMW
7	24 November	(Spain) Jerez	(Spain) Carmelo Morales	(Spain) Carmelo Morales	(Spain) Carmelo Morales	Kawasaki
7	24 November	(Spain) Jerez	(Spain) Carmelo Morales	(Spain) Carmelo Morales	(Spain) Iván Silva	BMW

== Entry list ==
Team	Bike	No.	Rider	Rounds
(Spain) BMW Easyrace	BMW	24	(Spain) Javier Pascual	7
(Spain) BMW Easyrace	BMW	81	(Spain) Eduardo Salvador	1, 6–7
(Spain) Club Deportivo Dorsal 23	BMW	72	(Spain) Rafael Samper	5
(Spain) Egüés – Skull Pacheco / SLMA	BMW	35	(Spain) Mario Peru	2, 5
(Spain) Extremadura Competicion, Vrya	BMW	19	(Spain) Raúl Gómez	1, 7
(Spain) Falketa Team	BMW	14	(Spain) Sergio Mateo	6
(France) JEG Racing	BMW	56	(France) Laurent Frédéric	All
(France) JEG Racing	BMW	65	(France) Juan Gómez	1–3
(Spain) JP Racing	BMW	10	(Spain) Jon Purroy	1–2, 5
(Spain) JP Racing	BMW	46	(Spain) Andrés Cuesta	2, 5
(Finland) Motomarket Racing	BMW	91	(Finland) Eeki Kuparinen	7
(Spain) OB Racing Team	BMW	76	(Spain) Óscar Borrajo	5
(Italy) Patrick Racing	BMW	26	(Italy) Enrico Pasini	6
(Spain) R.Borrajo Racing Team	BMW	82	(Spain) Rubén Borrajo	5
(Spain) Racing Bikers Team	BMW	96	(Spain) Moisés Chamorro	6
(Spain) Team Stratos	BMW	55	(Spain) Héctor Faubel	All
(Spain) Targobank Motorsport	BMW	22	(Spain) Iván Silva	All
(Spain) Targobank Motorsport	BMW	69	(Spain) Enrique Ferrer	All
(Spain) Ducati Pompone; Ducati Twelve	Ducati	12	(Spain) Xavi Forés	All
(Spain) Ducati Pompone; Ducati Twelve	Ducati	57	(Spain) Ferran Casas	1–2
Team Honda Sweden	Honda	21	(Sweden) Andreas Mårtensson	1–3
(Spain) Albaracing Motorsport	Kawasaki	11	(Spain) Sergio Ortega	3
(Spain) Albaracing Motorsport	Kawasaki	64	(Spain) Raúl Martinez	3–4
(Spain) Andalucia Cádiz Pastrana Racing Team	Kawasaki	90	(Spain) Javier Alviz	All
(Spain) Basoli Competicio	Kawasaki	49	(France) Fabien Parchard	1, 4–7
(Spain) Basoli Competicio	Kawasaki	94	(Spain) Fran Rodríguez	1–6
BWG Racing Kawasaki Italy	Kawasaki	71	(Italy) Stefano Cruciani	7
(Spain) Club Deportivo Zona Roja	Kawasaki	44	(Spain) Carlos Lamberto	5
(France) Dumas Racing Team	Kawasaki	15	(France) Mathieu Dumas	1–4, 6–7
(Spain) Garrote Racing Team	Kawasaki	28	(Spain) Javier Prieto	5
(Spain) Hospitality Motobox	Kawasaki	11	(Spain) Guillermo Llano	4–7
(Spain) ITCA–Tecnomoto	Kawasaki	27	(Spain) Alan Vilches	1
(France) JEG Racing	Kawasaki	16	(France) Sébastien Prulhière	1
(France) JEG Racing	Kawasaki	43	(Canada) Chris Cotton–Russell	All
(France) JEG Racing	Kawasaki	65	(France) Juan Gómez	6–7
(France) JEG Racing	Kawasaki	66	(France) Philippe Le Gallo	1, 4–7
(Spain) Kawasaki Palmeto–PL Racing	Kawasaki	18	(Spain) Lucas De Ulacia	All
(Spain) Kawasaki Palmeto–PL Racing	Kawasaki	53	(Spain) Antonio Alarcos	All
(Russia) Motorrika	Kawasaki	9	(Russia) Andrei Martsevich	1–2
(United Kingdom) MSG Racing	Kawasaki	95	(United Kingdom) Ryan Gibson	6–7
(United Kingdom) Quelch BSD Motorsport	Kawasaki	34	(Australia) Bryce Van Hoof	4–7
(United Kingdom) Quelch BSD Motorsport	Kawasaki	63	(United Kingdom) James White	6–7
(United Kingdom) Quelch BSD Motorsport	Kawasaki	84	(Australia) Nathan Jones	6–7
(United Kingdom) Quelch BSD Motorsport	Kawasaki	86	(Australia) Tyson Jones	6–7
(United Kingdom) Quelch BSD Motorsport	Kawasaki	95	(United Kingdom) Ryan Gibson	1–4
(Spain) RCM Competición	Kawasaki	87	(Spain) Raúl García	3–7
(Spain) Team Aparicio/Box Extremo	Kawasaki	6	(Spain) Andrés Aparicio	7
(Spain) Team Calvo	Kawasaki	4	(Venezuela) Robertino Pietri	All
(Spain) Team Calvo	Kawasaki	31	(Spain) Carmelo Morales	All
(Spain) Team Calvo	Kawasaki	39	(Argentina) Marcos Solorza	All
(Italy) Andreozzi Reparto Corse	MV Agusta	61	(Italy) Alessandro Andreozzi	7
(Italy) Gaspar Competicio	Suzuki	25	(Italy) Massimiliano Chetry	1
(Italy) Gaspar Competicio	Suzuki	77	(Spain) Marc Creu	1
(France) Martinez Racing Team	Suzuki	7	(France) Jonathan Martinez	6
(Spain) PPRT–Speedmotos Estepona	Suzuki	93	(Spain) Daniel Torreño	7
(Portugal) SBK/Incortcar	Suzuki	14	(Portugal) André Pires	3, 5
(Spain) Team Suzuki Speed Racing	Suzuki	9	(United States) Kenny Noyes	6–7
(Spain) Team Suzuki Speed Racing	Suzuki	23	(Spain) Adrián Bonastre	All
(Spain) Team Suzuki Speed Racing	Suzuki	51	(Spain) Santiago Barragán	All
(Spain) Tecnimotor Antequera	Suzuki	32	(Spain) Daniel Lastra	7

== Championship standings ==
Pos.	Rider	Bike	CAT (Spain)	ARA (Spain)	ALB1 (Spain)	ALB2 (Spain)		NAV (Spain)	VAL (Spain)	JER (Spain)		Pts
1	(Spain) Xavi Forés	Ducati	1^{P} ^{F}	2	1^{P} ^{F}	1^{P} ^{F}	1^{P} ^{F}	1^{P}	3	2	2	201
2	(Spain) Carmelo Morales	Kawasaki	5	1	2	2	2	2^{F}	2^{P} ^{F}	1^{P} ^{F}	Ret^{P} ^{F}	161
3	(Spain) Iván Silva	BMW	2	5^{P} ^{F}	3	3	3	3	1	4	1	158
4	(Spain) Adrián Bonastre	Suzuki	4	9	4	5	4	5	11	7	8	90
5	(Spain) Enrique Ferrer	BMW	7	7	9	7	7	6	6	6	6	83
6	(Spain) Antonio Alarcos	Kawasaki	Ret	3	5	6	6	4	7	16	5	80
7	(Spain) Santiago Barragán	Suzuki	3	4	7	Ret	5	7	8	9	11	78
8	(Venezuela) Robertino Pietri	Kawasaki	10	6	6	4	Ret	11	Ret	5	4	68
9	(Spain) Héctor Faubel	BMW	6	8	Ret	10	9	10	5	8	7	65
10	(Spain) Marcos Solorza	Kawasaki	15	10	11	8	8	9	9	11	9	54
11	(United States) Kenny Noyes	Suzuki							4	3	3	45
12	(Spain) Javier Alviz	Kawasaki	8	13	Ret	11	10	14	10	25	10	36
13	(Spain) Raúl García	Kawasaki			10	9	16	DSQ	12	Ret	Ret	17
14	(France) Mathieu Dumas	Kawasaki	9	17	18	14	12		20	14	21	15
15	(Spain) Fran Rodríguez	Kawasaki	13	12	12	15	Ret	Ret	13			15
16	(Spain) Jon Purroy	BMW	Ret	11				8				13
17	(Spain) Guillermo Llano	Kawasaki				13	11	DNS	Ret	19	15	9
18	(France) Fabien Parchard	Kawasaki	16			18	17	16	14	12	13	9
19	(Sweden) Andreas Mårtensson	Honda	DNS	DSQ	8							8
20	(Italy) Alessandro Andreozzi	MV Agusta								10	Ret	6
21	(Spain) Ferran Casas	Ducati	11	15								6
22	(Spain) Raúl Martinez	Kawasaki			14	12	Ret					6
23	(France) Laurent Frédéric	BMW	14	16	17	Ret	13	15	17	23	18	6
24	(France) Juan Gómez	BMW	Ret	14	15							6
24	(France) Juan Gómez	Kawasaki							15	18	14	6
25	(Australia) Bryce Van Hoof	Kawasaki				16	14	13	16	17	17	5
26	(Spain) Carlos Lamberto	Kawasaki						12				4
27	(United Kingdom) Ryan Gibson	Kawasaki	12	18	19	DNS	DNS		24	22	Ret	4
28	(Italy) Stefano Cruciani	Kawasaki								Ret	12	4
29	(Spain) Sergio Ortega	Kawasaki			13							3
30	(Spain) Daniel Torreño	Suzuki								13	16	3
31	(Spain) Lucas De Ulacia	Kawasaki	DNQ	Ret	Ret	17	15	Ret	Ret	28	23	1
32	(United Kingdom) James White	Kawasaki							21	15	Ret	1
	(Portugal) André Pires	Suzuki			16			23				0
	(Spain) Óscar Borrajo	BMW						17				0
	(Italy) Massimiliano Chetry	Suzuki	17									0
	(France) Jonathan Martinez	Suzuki							18			0
	(Spain) Javier Prieto	Kawasaki						18				0
	(France) Sébastien Prulhière	Kawasaki	18									0
	(Canada) Chris Cotton–Russell	Kawasaki	DNQ	20	DNQ	19	18	22	23	27	24	0
	(Spain) Rubén Borrajo	BMW						19				0
	(Spain) Mario Peru	BMW		19				20				0
	(Australia) Tyson Jones	Kawasaki							19	20	27	0
	(France) Philippe Le Gallo	Kawasaki	DNQ			20	19	Ret	Ret	Ret	28	0
	(Australia) Nathan Jones	Kawasaki							Ret	21	19	0
	(Spain) Eduardo Salvador	BMW	19						Ret	Ret	26	0
	(Spain) Raúl Gómez	BMW	20							26	25	0
	(Spain) Andrés Aparicio	Kawasaki								Ret	20	0
	(Spain) Rafael Samper	BMW						21				0
	(Spain) Sergio Mateo	BMW							22			0
	(Spain) Daniel Lastra	Suzuki								24	22	0
	(Finland) Eeki Kuparinen	BMW								Ret	Ret	0
	(Spain) Javier Pascual	BMW								Ret	Ret	0
	(Spain) Andrés Cuesta	BMW		Ret				DNS				0
	(Russia) Andrei Martsevich	Kawasaki	Ret	DNS								0
	(Spain) Alan Vilches	Kawasaki	Ret									0
	(Italy) Enrico Pasini	BMW							DSQ			0
	(Spain) Moisés Chamorro	BMW							DNQ			
	(Spain) Marc Creu	Suzuki	DNQ									
Pos.	Rider	Bike	CAT (Spain)	ARA (Spain)	ALB1 (Spain)	ALB2 (Spain)		NAV (Spain)	VAL (Spain)	JER (Spain)		Pts

Colour	Result
Gold	Winner
Silver	Second place
Bronze	Third place
Green	Points classification
Blue	Non-points classification
Blue	Non-classified finish (NC)
Purple	Retired, not classified (Ret)
Red	Did not qualify (DNQ)
Red	Did not pre-qualify (DNPQ)
Black	Disqualified (DSQ)
White	Did not start (DNS)
White	Withdrew (WD)
White	Race cancelled (C)
Blank	Did not practice (DNP)
Blank	Did not arrive (DNA)
Blank	Excluded (EX)

P – Pole position
F – Fastest lap
