= 2016 FIM CEV Superbike European Championship =

2016 FIM CEV Superbike European Championship
Previous:	2015	Next:	none
Support series: FIM CEV Moto3 Junior World Championship; FIM CEV Moto2 European Championship

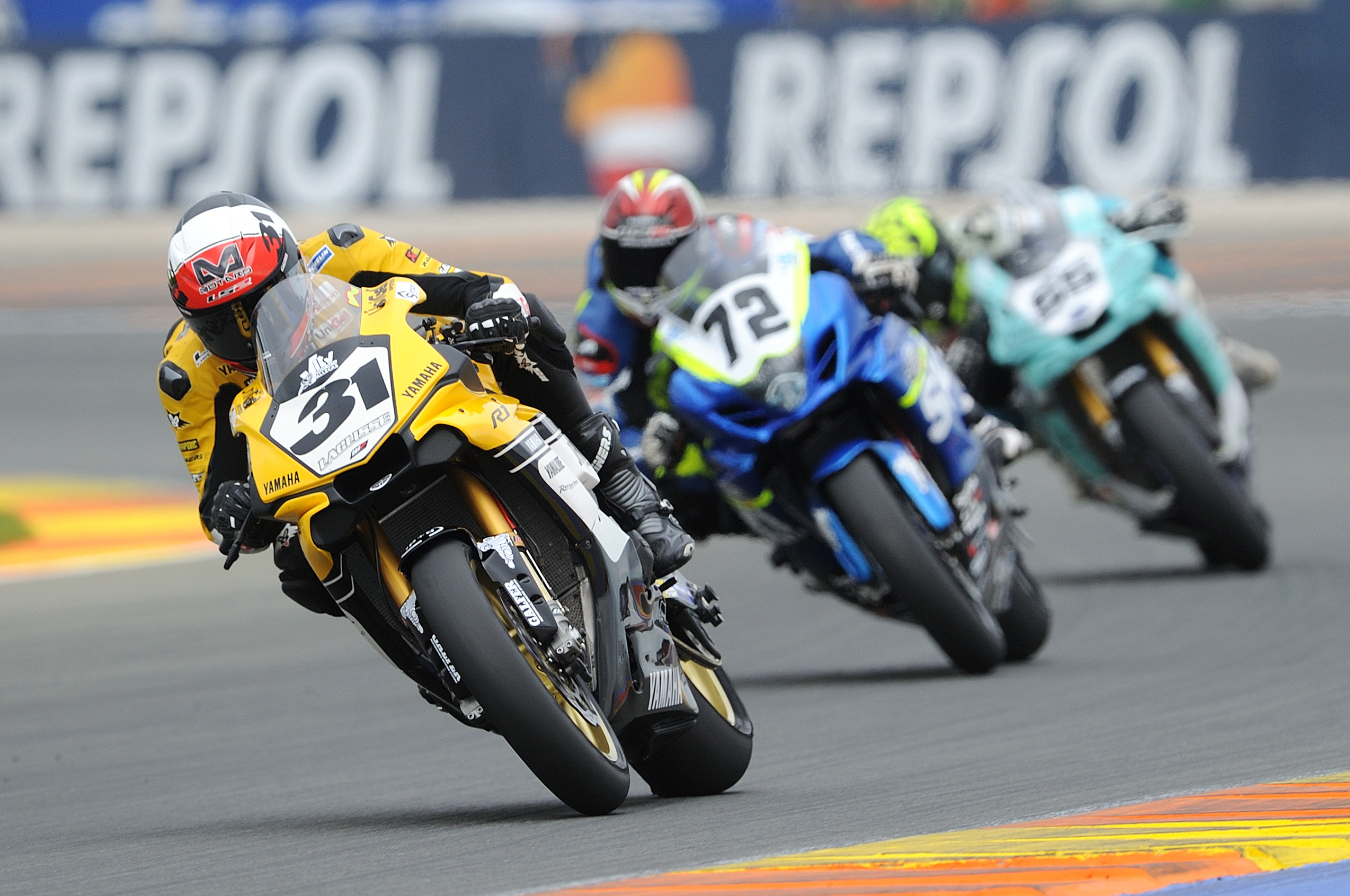
Carmelo Morales (left) battling with Anthony Delhalle (center), and Alejandro Medina (right) at Circuit Ricardo Tormo

The 2016 FIM CEV Superbike European Championship was the third and final season of the Superbike European Championship series. The series would be discontinued from next year onward and would be replaced by the new European Talent Cup series. Spaniard Carmelo Morales won the title back to back after beating closest rival Maximilian Scheib.

== Race calendar and results ==
Round	Date	Circuit	Pole position	Fastest lap	Winning rider	Winning team	Winning Constructor
1	17 April	(Spain) Circuit Ricardo Tormo	(Spain) Santiago Barragán	(Spain) Carmelo Morales	(Chile) Maximilian Scheib	Targobank Easyrace	BMW
2	29 May	(Spain) MotorLand Aragón	(Spain) Carmelo Morales	(Chile) Maximilian Scheib	(Spain) Carmelo Morales	Yamaha Laglisse	Yamaha
2	29 May	(Spain) MotorLand Aragón	(Spain) Carmelo Morales	(Spain) Carmelo Morales	(Spain) Carmelo Morales	Yamaha Laglisse	Yamaha
3	12 June	(Spain) Circuit de Barcelona-Catalunya	(Spain) Carmelo Morales	(Chile) Maximilian Scheib	(Spain) Carmelo Morales	Yamaha Laglisse	Yamaha
4	3 July	(Spain) Circuito de Albacete	(Spain) Carmelo Morales	(Chile) Maximilian Scheib	(Chile) Maximilian Scheib	Targobank Easyrace	BMW
4	3 July	(Spain) Circuito de Albacete	(Spain) Carmelo Morales	(Spain) Carmelo Morales	(Spain) Carmelo Morales	Yamaha Laglisse	Yamaha
5	28 August	(Portugal) Algarve International Circuit	(Spain) Carmelo Morales	(Spain) Carmelo Morales	(Spain) Carmelo Morales	Yamaha Laglisse	Yamaha
5	28 August	(Portugal) Algarve International Circuit	(Spain) Carmelo Morales	(Spain) Carmelo Morales	(Spain) Carmelo Morales	Yamaha Laglisse	Yamaha
6	2 October	(Spain) Circuito de Jerez	(Chile) Maximilian Scheib	(Spain) Carmelo Morales	(Spain) Carmelo Morales	Yamaha Laglisse	Yamaha
6	2 October	(Spain) Circuito de Jerez	(Chile) Maximilian Scheib	(Chile) Maximilian Scheib	(Spain) Carmelo Morales	Yamaha Laglisse	Yamaha
7	20 November	(Spain) Circuit Ricardo Tormo	(Chile) Maximilian Scheib	(Chile) Maximilian Scheib	(Chile) Maximilian Scheib	Targobank Easyrace	BMW

== Entry list ==
Team	Constructor	No.	Rider	Rounds
(Denmark) Chronos Corse – TMP Racing Sport	Aprilia	58	(Denmark) Michael Møller Pedersen	All
(Spain) Arc Competicion	BMW	25	(Spain) Roberto Blazquez	All
(United Kingdom) Danny Tomlinson Racing	BMW	8	(United Kingdom) Mike Booth	7
(Spain) DR7 Proelit Racing Team	BMW	23	(Spain) Adrián Bonastre	1
(Spain) DR7 Proelit Racing Team	BMW	99	(Spain) Pedro Rodríguez	1
(United Kingdom) HM Racing Diablo 666	BMW	96	(United Kingdom) Piers Hutchins	7
(United Kingdom) Jones Dorling Racing	BMW	48	(United Kingdom) Ash Beech	7
(United Kingdom) Mcnealy Brown	BMW	30	(United Kingdom) Rob Mcnealy	7
(Finland) Motomarket Racing	BMW	76	(Finland) Valter Patronen	1–2
(Spain) Targobank Easyrace SBK Team	BMW	7	(Chile) Maximilian Scheib	All
(Spain) Targobank Easyrace SBK Team	BMW	39	(Argentina) Marcos Solorza Parada	5–6
(Spain) Targobank Easyrace SBK Team	BMW	51	(Spain) Santiago Barragán	1–4
(Spain) Targobank Easyrace SBK Team	BMW	99	(Spain) Pedro Rodríguez	7
(Netherlands) EAB Racing Team by Schacht Racing	Ducati	57	(Denmark) Alex Schacht	6
(France) JEG Ducatimo	Ducati	17	(France) Thierry Mulot	2–3, 6
(Norway) Plassen Roadracing Team	Ducati	65	(Norway) Ole Bjørn Plassen	All
(Finland) Motomarket Racing	Kawasaki	5	(Finland) Eeki Kuparinen	All
(Spain) Kawasaki Palmeto PL Racing	Kawasaki	18	(Spain) Lucas De Ulacia	3
(Spain) Kawasaki Palmeto PL Racing	Kawasaki	47	(Spain) Ángel Rodríguez	3
(Portugal) Oneundret Racing Team	Kawasaki	35	(Indonesia) Rafid Topan Sucipto	7
(Portugal) Oneundret Racing Team	Kawasaki	91	(Portugal) Tiago Magalhães	1–6
(Portugal) RLPerformance 58	Kawasaki	50	(Portugal) Ricardo Lopes	5
(Spain) Speed Racing – Andalucia CRT	Kawasaki	90	(Spain) Javier Alviz	7
(Spain) SRTeam	Kawasaki	88	(Spain) Juan Luis Ortiz	4–7
(Spain) Team Speed Racing	Kawasaki	3	(Italy) Fabrizio Perotti	7
(Spain) Team Tack	Kawasaki	69	(South Africa) David McFadden	5
(France) TEX Racing	Kawasaki	46	(France) Pierre Texier	All
(France) JEG Racing	Suzuki	43	(Canada) Chris Cotton-Russell	All
(France) JEG Racing	Suzuki	72	(France) Anthony Delhalle	1–2, 4, 6–7
(France) JEG Racing	Suzuki	94	(Japan) Naomichi Uramoto	7
(Spain) CRT Motorsport	Yamaha	16	(Spain) Oscar Climent	1–4, 6–7
(United Kingdom) G.A. Racing	Yamaha	19	(United Kingdom) Ryan Gibson	7
(France) Gil Motor Sport	Yamaha	95	(France) Christophe Ponsson	7
(Luxembourg) Leopard Yamaha Stratos	Yamaha	12	(Spain) Guillermo Llano	All
(Luxembourg) Leopard Yamaha Stratos	Yamaha	33	(Finland) Niko Mäkinen	All
(Luxembourg) Leopard Yamaha Stratos	Yamaha	55	(Spain) Alejandro Medina	1, 3–7
(Luxembourg) Leopard Yamaha Stratos	Yamaha	75	(Finland) Mika Höglund	All
(Spain) Quixote Yamalube /KM Xtra	Yamaha	84	(Argentina) Diego Pierluigi	1–4
(Spain) RTM / Jacomoto Azmer	Yamaha	80	(Spain) Erik Morillas	7
(France) Team CMS	Yamaha	10	(France) Benjamim Colliaux	7
(France) Team CMS	Yamaha	15	(France) Mathieu Dumas	7
(France) Team CMS	Yamaha	89	(France) Axel Maurin	7
(Spain) Yamaha Laglisse	Yamaha	31	(Spain) Carmelo Morales	All
(Spain) Yamaha Laglisse	Yamaha	66	(France) Philippe Le Gallo	All

Key
Regular rider
Wildcard rider
Replacement rider

== Championship' standings ==
Points were awarded to the top fifteen riders, provided the rider finished the race.

Position	1st	2nd	3rd	4th	5th	6th	7th	8th	9th	10th	11th	12th	13th	14th	15th
Points	25	20	16	13	11	10	9	8	7	6	5	4	3	2	1

Pos.	Rider	Bike	VAL (Spain)	ARA (Spain)		BAR (Spain)	ALB (Spain)		POR (Portugal)		JER (Spain)		VAL (Spain)	Pts
1	(Spain) Carmelo Morales	Yamaha	Ret^{F}	1^{P}	1^{PF}	1^{P}	2^{P}	1^{PF}	1^{PF}	1^{PF}	1^{F}	1	2	240
2	(Chile) Maximilian Scheib	BMW	1	3^{F}	2	2^{F}	1^{F}	9	2	2	2^{P}	2^{PF}	1^{PF}	218
3	(Spain) Alejandro Medina	Yamaha	2			3	4	3	3	3	4	4	9	130
4	(France) Anthony Delhalle	Suzuki	4	4	4		3	2			3	3	7	116
5	(France) Pierre Texier	Kawasaki	8	8	6	Ret	5	4	5	4	6	Ret	10	90
6	(Finland) Niko Mäkinen	Yamaha	5	5	Ret	DNS	6	7	8	7	7	6	DNS	77
7	(Finland) Eeki Kuparinen	Kawasaki	13	Ret	8	5	7	6	4	6	11	11	DNS	74
8	(Spain) Oscar Climent	Yamaha	7	6	5	4	Ret	DNS			10	7	13	61
9	(Portugal) Tiago Magalhães	Kawasaki	14	9	11	9	10	8	7	9	15	13		55
10	(Spain) Santiago Barragán	BMW	3^{P}	2	3	DNS	DNS	DNS						52
11	(Spain) Guillermo Llano	Yamaha	9	11	9	12	Ret	10	10	8	13	10	Ret	52
12	(Canada) Chris Cotton-Russell	Suzuki	11	10	12	Ret	8	11	9	Ret	12	9	Ret	46
13	(Norway) Ole Bjørn Plassen	Ducati	DNS	Ret	7	7	Ret	DNS	WD	WD	8	8	6	44
14	(Argentina) Marcos Solorza Parada	BMW							6	5	5	5		43
15	(Spain) Roberto Blazquez	BMW	15	Ret	14	10	9	12	11	10	14	12	15	38
16	(Argentina) Diego Pierluigi	Yamaha	12	7	Ret	6	Ret	5						34
17	(Denmark) Michael Møller Pedersen	Aprilia	Ret	13	13	11	Ret	13	13	12	16	14	19	23
18	(France) Christophe Ponsson	Yamaha											3	16
19	(Japan) Naomichi Uramoto	Suzuki											4	13
20	(Finland) Mika Höglund	Yamaha	16	15	16	13	13	15	15	13	DNS	DNS	18	12
21	(France) Axel Maurin	Yamaha											5	11
22	(France) Philippe Le Gallo	Yamaha	17	16	17	14	11	NC	14	14	18	16	21	11
23	(Spain) Adrián Bonastre	BMW	6											10
24	(France) Thierry Mulot	Ducati		12	10	DNS					Ret	DNS		10
25	(Portugal) Ricardo Lopes	Kawasaki							12	11				9
26	(Spain) Lucas De Ulacia	Kawasaki				8								8
27	(Italy) Fabrizio Perotti	Kawasaki											8	8
28	(Denmark) Alex Schacht	Ducati									9	Ret		7
29	(Spain) Juan Luis Ortiz	Kawasaki					12	14	16	Ret	17	15	20	7
30	(Spain) Pedro Rodríguez	BMW	10										DNS	6
31	(United Kingdom) Ash Beech	BMW											11	5
32	(Indonesia) Rafid Topan Sucipto	Kawasaki											12	4
33	(Finland) Valter Patronen	BMW	DNS	14	15									3
34	(Spain) Javier Alviz	Kawasaki											14	2
	(France) Mathieu Dumas	Yamaha											16	0
	(United Kingdom) Piers Hutchins	BMW											17	0
	(Spain) Ángel Rodríguez	Kawasaki				Ret								0
	(South Africa) David McFadden	Kawasaki							Ret	Ret				0
	(France) Benjamin Colliaux	Yamaha											Ret	0
	(Spain) Erik Morillas	Yamaha											Ret	0
	(United Kingdom) Mike Booth	BMW											Ret	0
	(United Kingdom) Rob McNealy	BMW											Ret	0
	(United Kingdom) Ryan Gibson	Yamaha											Ret	0
Pos.	Rider	Bike	VAL (Spain)	ARA (Spain)		BAR (Spain)	ALB (Spain)		POR (Portugal)		JER (Spain)		VAL (Spain)	Points

Colour	Result
Gold	Winner
Silver	Second place
Bronze	Third place
Green	Points classification
Blue	Non-points classification
Blue	Non-classified finish (NC)
Purple	Retired, not classified (Ret)
Red	Did not qualify (DNQ)
Red	Did not pre-qualify (DNPQ)
Black	Disqualified (DSQ)
White	Did not start (DNS)
White	Withdrew (WD)
White	Race cancelled (C)
Blank	Did not practice (DNP)
Blank	Did not arrive (DNA)
Blank	Excluded (EX)

P – Pole position
F – Fastest lap
