= Julián Miralles Rodríguez =

Spanish motorcycle racer

Julián Miralles
- Nationality: Spanish
- Born: 16 November 1988 (age 38); Alberic, Spain
- Current team: GRAPHENANO EASYRACE TEAM
- Bike number: 84
Motorcycle racing career statistics
Moto3 World Championship
Active years	2012
Manufacturers	Honda
Championships	0
2012 championship position	NC (0 pts)
Starts / Wins / Podiums / Poles / F. laps / Points; 1 / 0 / 0 / 0 / 0 / 0
125cc World Championship
Active years	2004–2005, 2008
Manufacturers	Aprilia
Championships	0
2008 championship position	NC (0 pts)
Starts / Wins / Podiums / Poles / F. laps / Points; 11 / 0 / 0 / 0 / 0 / 0

Julián Miralles Rodríguez (born 16 November 1988 in Alberic, Spain) is a Spanish motorcycle racer. He is son of a former motorcycle racer, also named Julián Miralles. He currently competes in the RFME Open 1000 Championship, aboard a BMW S1000RR.

== Career statistics ==
=== CEV Moto3 Championship ===
==== Races by year ====
(key) (Races in bold indicate pole position, races in italics indicate fastest lap)

Year	Bike	1	2	3	4	5	6	7	Pos	Pts
2012	Honda	JER; 13	NAV; 14	ARA; 5	CAT; 18	ALB1; 7	ALB2	VAL; 6	11th	37

=== FIM Moto2 European Championship ===
==== Races by year ====
(key) (Races in bold indicate pole position) (Races in italics indicate fastest lap)

Year	Bike	1	2	3	4	5	6	7	8	9	10	11	Pos	Pts
2015	MIR Racing	ALG1; 27	ALG2; 21	CAT; 17	ARA1; 19	ARA2; 19	ALB; 19	NAV1; 11	NAV2; 14	JER; 19	VAL1; 16	VAL2; 17	26th	7

=== Grand Prix motorcycle racing ===
==== By season ====
Season	Class	Motorcycle	Team	Number	Races	Win	Podium	Pole	FLap	Pts	Position
2004	125cc	Aprilia	MIR Racing	70	4	0	0	0	0	0	NC
2005	125cc	Aprilia	MVA Aspar	84	6	0	0	0	0	0	NC
2008	125cc	Aprilia	Bancaja Mir CEV	23	1	0	0	0	0	0	NC
2012	Moto3	Honda	MIR Racing	40	1	0	0	0	0	0	NC
Total					**12**	**0**	**0**	**0**	**0**	**0**	

==== Races by year ====
(key)

Year	Class	Team	1	2	3	4	5	6	7	8	9	10	11	12	13	14	15	16	17	Pos.	Pts
2004	125cc	Aprilia	RSA	SPA; 16	FRA; 25	ITA	CAT	NED	BRA	GER; Ret	GBR	CZE	POR	JPN	QAT	MAL	AUS	VAL; 19		NC	0
2005	125cc	Aprilia	SPA; 19	POR; 28	CHN; 23	FRA; 16	ITA; DNS	CAT	NED	GBR	GER	CZE; 25	JPN	MAL	QAT	AUS	TUR	VAL; 25		NC	0
2008	125cc	Aprilia	QAT	SPA	POR	CHN	FRA	ITA	CAT	GBR	NED	GER	CZE	RSM	INP	JPN	AUS	MAL	VAL; DSQ	NC	0
2012	Moto3	Honda	QAT	SPA	POR	FRA	CAT	GBR	NED; 26	GER	ITA	INP	CZE	RSM	ARA	JPN	MAL	AUS	VAL	NC	0

=== FIM eRoad Racing World Cup ===
Year	Team	1	2	3	4	Pos	Pts
2013	Renegade Z	ESP1; 5	ESP2; 4	GER	FRA	7th	24
