= Iván Moreno (motorcyclist) =

Spanish motorcycle racer

- Nationality: Spanish
- Born: 26 February 1989 (age 37); Cádiz, Spain
Motorcycle racing career statistics
Moto2 World Championship
Active years	2010–2011
Manufacturers	Moriwaki, Suter
2011 championship position	NC (0 pts)
Starts / Wins / Podiums / Poles / F. laps / Points; 3 / 0 / 0 / 0 / 0 / 0
Moto3 World Championship
Active years	2012
Manufacturers	FTR Honda
2012 championship position	25th (10 pts)
Starts / Wins / Podiums / Poles / F. laps / Points; 9 / 0 / 0 / 0 / 0 / 10

Iván Moreno (born 26 February 1989) is a Spanish former Grand Prix motorcycle racer.

Moreno announced his retirement in 2013 in order to pursue a career as a physical trainer.

== Career statistics ==
=== By season ===
Season	Class	Motorcycle	Team	Number	Race	Win	Podium	Pole	FLap	Pts	Plcd
2010	Moto2	Moriwaki	Andalucia Cajasol	91	1	0	0	0	0	0	NC
2011	Moto2	Suter	Mapfre Aspar Team Moto2	20	2	0	0	0	0	0	NC
2012	Moto3	FTR Honda	Andalucia JHK Laglisse	21	9	0	0	0	0	10	25th
Total					12	0	0	0	0	10	

==== Races by year ====
(key)

Yr	Class	Bike	1	2	3	4	5	6	7	8	9	10	11	12	13	14	15	16	17	Pos	Pts
2010	Moto2	Moriwaki	QAT	SPA; Ret	FRA	ITA	GBR	NED	CAT	GER	CZE	IND	RSM	ARA	JPN	MAL	AUS	POR	VAL	NC	0
2011	Moto2	Suter	QAT	SPA	POR	FRA	CAT	GBR	NED	ITA	GER	CZE	IND	RSM	ARA	JPN	AUS; 25	MAL; 19	VAL	NC	0
2012	Moto3	FTR Honda	QAT; 19	SPA; 13	POR; 20	FRA; 9	CAT; 18	GBR; 22	NED; 29	GER; 25	ITA; 26	IND	CZE	RSM	ARA	JPN	MAL	AUS	VAL	25th	10
