= Kenny Noyes =

American motorcycle racer

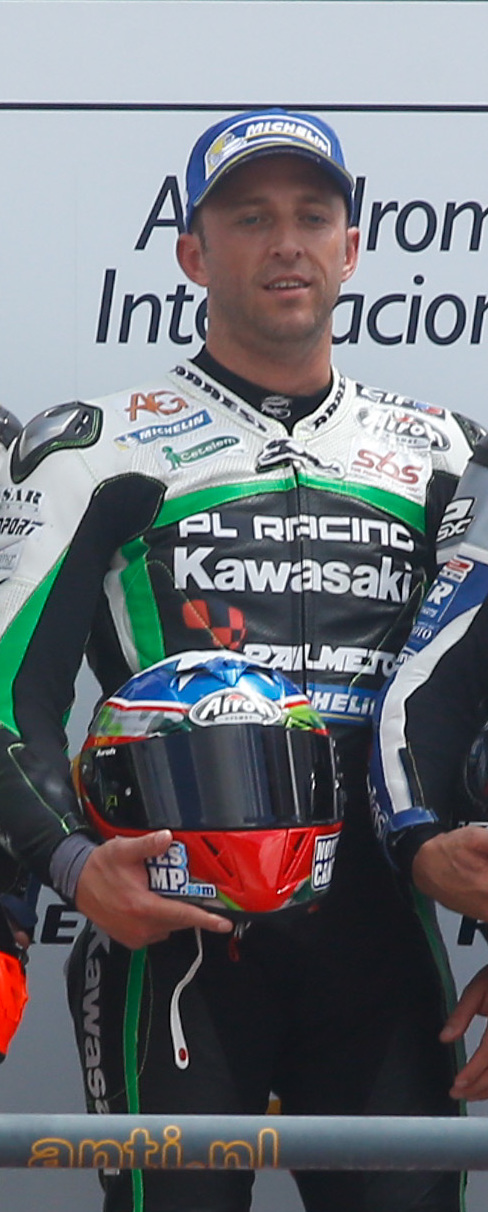
- Noyes in 2015
- Nationality: American
- Born: June 18, 1979 (age 47); Barcelona, Spain
- Website: kennynoyes.com
Motorcycle racing career statistics
Moto2 World Championship
Active years	2010–2011, 2014
Manufacturers	Promoharris, FTR, TSR
Starts / Wins / Podiums / Poles / F. laps / Points; 35 / 0 / 0 / 1 / 0 / 33

Kenny Noyes (born 18 June 1979) is an American motorcycle road racer. His parents Dennis and Heidi Noyes are both American, but lived in Spain for over 20 years where Dennis raced winning the Spanish Endurance Championship, the Motociclismo Series twice, and the Spanish Superbike Championship in 2014.

== Career ==
Born in Barcelona, Spain, Noyes began dirt-track racing in the US, winning the national championship before returning to Spain to begin road racing. In 2003, he became Spanish Superstock Champion, and won the Endurance title two years later. His first CEV 1000cc Extreme National podium came in 2008, and he challenged for the title in 2009.

Noyes made his international racing debut in the new Moto2 series in 2010. He was competitive immediately, briefly leading at Jerez. and starting from pole at Le Mans, however he was less competitive in the next three races. He finished 24th in the championship (of 30).

Noyes raced for 2012 in the Spanish CEV Moto2 championship for PL Racing Moto2 aboard a Suter finishing third overall with four podiums. Noyes signed for the LaGlisse team (renamed Team Calvo) for the 2013 season, staying in CEV Moto2 once again aboard a Suter.

== Career statistics ==
=== By Seasons ===
Season	Class	Motorcycle	Team	Number	Race	Win	Podium	Pole	Pts	Pos
2010	Moto2	Harris Moto2	Jack & Jones by A.Bandereas	9	17	0	0	1	22	24th
2011	Moto2	FTR Moto M211	Avintia-STX	9	17	0	0	0	11	28th
2014	Moto2	TSR TSR6	Teluru Team JiR Webike	9	1	0	0	0	0	NC
Total					**35**	**0**	**0**	**1**	**33**	

=== By class ===
Class	Seasons	1st GP	1st Pod	1st Win	Races	Wins	Podiums	Poles	FLaps	Pts	WChmp
Moto2	2010–2011, 2014	2010 Qatar			35	0	0	1	0	33	0
Total	2010–2011, 2014				**35**	**0**	**0**	**1**	**0**	**33**	**0**

=== Races by year ===
(key) (Races in bold indicate pole position)

Year	Class	Bike	1	2	3	4	5	6	7	8	9	10	11	12	13	14	15	16	17	18	Pos	Pts
2010	Moto2	Promoharris	QAT; 18	SPA; 7	**FRA**; Ret	ITA; 26	GBR; 21	NED; 22	CAT; 7	GER; 21	CZE; Ret	INP; 19	RSM; 24	ARA; Ret	JPN; 22	MAL; 18	AUS; 31	POR; Ret	VAL; 12		24th	22
2011	Moto2	FTR	QAT; 24	SPA; 29	POR; 17	FRA; 17	CAT; Ret	GBR; Ret	NED; Ret	ITA; 29	GER; 20	CZE; 20	INP; Ret	RSM; 23	ARA; 23	JPN; 17	AUS; 22	MAL; NC	VAL; 5		28th	11
2014	Moto2	TSR	QAT	AME	ARG	SPA	FRA	ITA	CAT	NED	GER	INP	CZE	GBR	RSM	ARA; Ret	JPN	AUS	MAL	VAL	NC	0
