= Eskil Suter =

Swiss motorcycle racer

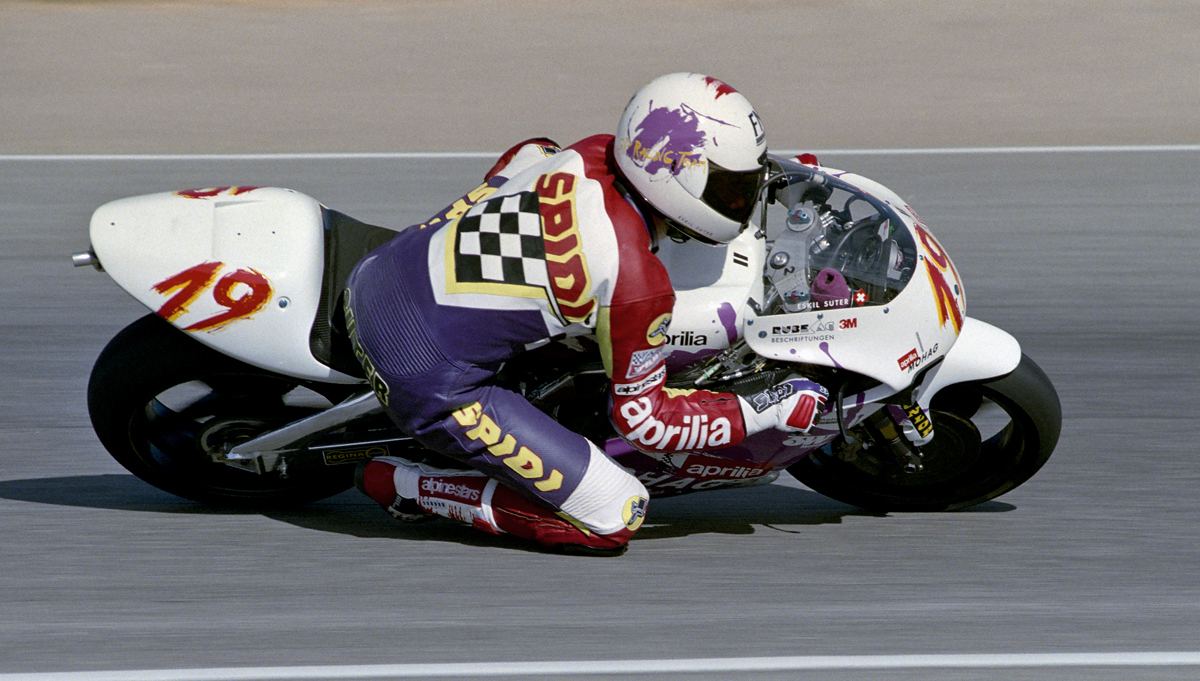
- Eskil Suter at the 1994 U.S Grand Prix
- Nationality: (Switzerland) Swiss
- Born: 29 June 1967 (age 59); Turbenthal, Switzerland
Motorcycle racing career statistics
Grand Prix motorcycle racing
| Active years | 1991 – 1996, 1998 |
| First race | 1991 250cc Austrian Grand Prix |
| Last race | 1998 500cc Catalan Grand Prix |
| Team | MuZ |
| Championships | 0 |
Starts / Wins / Podiums / Poles / F. laps / Points; 82 / 0 / 0 / 0 / 0 / 171

Eskil Suter (born 29 June 1967 in Turbenthal, Zürich, Switzerland) is a former Grand Prix motorcycle road racer and current motorcycle chassis constructor from Switzerland.

== Motorcycle racing career ==
In 1991, Suter finished in second place in the European 250cc Championship and in the 250cc International Lightweight class at the Daytona International Speedway. Suter had his best seasons in 1994 and 1996 when he finished in 13th place in the 250cc world championship. He raced in one round of the 1997 Superbike World Championship but failed to score any points. In the 1998 500cc season, he was a development rider for the MuZ team that used a Swissauto engine in a French-made ROC frame. When regular rider Doriano Romboni was injured in the second race of the season, Suter took over and scored points in three races.

== Suter Racing Technology ==
Suter Racing Technology
- Base: Turbenthal, Switzerland
- Principal: Eskil Suter
- Constructors' Championships: Moto2: 2010, 2011, 2012
- Riders' Championships: Moto2: 2012: Marc Márquez; CEV Moto3: 2012: Álex Márquez; CEV Moto2: 2010: Carmelo Morales; 2011: Jordi Torres; 2012: Jordi Torres; 2018: Jesko Raffin

Suter founded a company named Suter Racing Technology (SRT) in 1996, which specialized in project engineering applied to motorcycle racing. Suter developed, in cooperation with Swissauto, the MuZ 500 bike, in particular the chassis design and concept for the 1999 season, after the MuZ team decided to cease using the ROC frame.

SRT was responsible for the design and development of the Petronas FP1 900cc three-cylinder engine; the bike competed in the Superbike World Championship from 2002 to 2005. The company also helped with the development of Kawasaki ZX-RR MotoGP between 2004 and 2006. In 2006 and 2007, SRT was involved with Ilmor Engineering in the chassis design of the 800cc Ilmor X3 motorcycle.

In 2010, with the introduction of the new 600cc Moto2 class, Suter Racing Technology started providing its chassis to the category. Suter won the Manufacturers' Championship in 2010 and 2011, but none of its riders claimed the title. In 2012, Suter claimed its third consecutive Manufacturers' Championship and claimed its first rider's championship when Marc Márquez became the Moto2 World Champion.

SRT also built a MotoGP prototype machine for the 2012 season; the bike, powered by 1000cc BMW S1000RR engines, was tested from late 2010 and during 2011 by Marc VDS Racing Team. The bike competed in the top class with a Claiming Rule Team, Forward Racing.

=== SUTER MMX500 ===
SUTER MMX500 Specifications
| ENGINE TYPE | 4 Cylinder V4 90° two stroke with double counter rotating crankshaft |
| DISPLACEMENT | 576 cc (35.1 cu in) |
| BORE/STROKE | 56 mm × 58.5 mm (2.20 in × 2.30 in) |
| MAX POWER | 195hp at 13,000 rpm |
| WEIGHT | 127 kg (without tank) |
| ASPIRATION | Electronic fuel injection four port throttle body four carbon reed valves |
| EXHAUST VALVE | Double flap electronic controlled |
| EXHAUST | Akrapovic four single resonance Titanium chambers |
| GEARBOX | SRT six speed cassette gearbox |
| CLUTCH TYPE | SuterClutch multi disc dry |
| IGNITION | Mectronic ECU |
| FRAME | CNC machined Aluminium twin spar with multi adjustable steering/wheelbase/riding position/height |
| SWINGARM | Aluminium swingarm, CNC machined, adjustable |
| SUSPENSION | Öhlins upside down front fork & rear shock; all adjustable for pre-load, compression & rebound damping. Different rear links available |
| TYRES | 125/75 R 17 Front 205/75 R 17 Rear |
| WHEELS | OZ (Magnesium or Aluminium) 17x 3.75 Front; 17x 6.0 Rear |
| BRAKES | Brembo Two 320mm steel front disc with 4 piston calipers One 218 mm steel rear disc with 2 piston caliper |
| FUEL TANK | Carbon Fibre / Inbuilt fuel pump |
| BODYWORK | Carbon Fibre |
| MANUFACTURER | Suter Racing Technology (STR) |
| PRODUCTION | since 2015 99 units |

== Motorcycle Grand Prix results ==
Points system from 1988 to 1991:

| **Position** | 1 | 2 | 3 | 4 | 5 | 6 | 7 | 8 | 9 | 10 | 11 | 12 | 13 | 14 | 15 |
| **Points** | 20 | 17 | 15 | 13 | 11 | 10 | 9 | 8 | 7 | 6 | 5 | 4 | 3 | 2 | 1 |

Points system in 1992:

| **Position** | 1 | 2 | 3 | 4 | 5 | 6 | 7 | 8 | 9 | 10 |
| **Points** | 20 | 15 | 12 | 10 | 8 | 6 | 4 | 3 | 2 | 1 |

Points system from 1993:

| **Position** | 1 | 2 | 3 | 4 | 5 | 6 | 7 | 8 | 9 | 10 | 11 | 12 | 13 | 14 | 15 |
| **Points** | 25 | 20 | 16 | 13 | 11 | 10 | 9 | 8 | 7 | 6 | 5 | 4 | 3 | 2 | 1 |

(key) (Races in bold indicate pole position; races in italics indicate fastest lap)

| Year | Class | Team | Machine | 1 | 2 | 3 | 4 | 5 | 6 | 7 | 8 | 9 | 10 | 11 | 12 | 13 | 14 | 15 | Points | Rank | Wins |
|---|---|---|---|---|---|---|---|---|---|---|---|---|---|---|---|---|---|---|---|---|---|
| 1991 | 250cc | Marlboro Aprilia Mohag | RS250 | JPN | AUS | USA | ESP | ITA | GER | AUT; 17 | EUR; 23 | NED | FRA; 21 | GBR; 19 | RSM; 16 | CZE; NC | VDM | MAL | 0 | – | 0 |
| 1992 | 250cc | Marlboro Aprilia Mohag | RS250 | JPN; 14 | AUS; 23 | MAL; 19 | ESP; NC | ITA; 15 | EUR; 13 | GER; NC | NED; 20 | HUN; 23 | FRA; 11 | GBR; NC | BRA; 11 | RSA; 22 | | | 0 | – | 0 |
| 1993 | 250cc | Mohag Aprilia | RS250 | AUS; NC | MAL; 15 | JPN; 17 | ESP; 18 | AUT; 11 | GER; NC | NED; 14 | EUR; NC | RSM; 12 | GBR; 10 | CZE; NC | ITA; NC | USA; NC | FIM; 10 | | 24 | 19th | 0 |
| 1994 | 250cc | Mohag Aprilia | RS250 | AUS; 15 | MAL; NC | JPN; 15 | ESP; 10 | AUT; 10 | GER; NC | NED; 8 | ITA; NC | FRA; 14 | GBR; 10 | CZE; 8 | USA; 12 | ARG; 19 | EUR; NC | | 42 | 13th | 0 |
| 1995 | 250cc | Mohag Aprilia | RS250 | AUS; 13 | MAL; 12 | JPN; 8 | ESP; NC | GER; NC | ITA; 10 | NED; NC | FRA; 10 | GBR; 9 | CZE; NC | BRA; 12 | ARG | EUR; 11 | | | 43 | 14th | 0 |
| 1996 | 250cc | Mohag Aprilia | RS250 | MAL; NC | INA; 11 | JPN; 19 | ESP; NC | ITA; 12 | FRA; 7 | NED; 5 | GER; 13 | GBR; 10 | AUT; NC | CZE; 7 | IMO; NC | CAT; 9 | BRA; 15 | AUS; NC | 55 | 13th | 0 |
| 1998 | 500cc | MuZ-Weber | MuZ 500 | JPN | MAL | ESP | ITA; 18 | FRA; NC | MAD; 14 | NED | GBR; NC | GER; 13 | CZE; 14 | IMO; NC | CAT; NC | AUS | ARG | | 7 | 26th | 0 |
