= Toni Wirsing =

German motorcycle racer

- Nationality: German
- Born: 10 July 1990 (age 36); Chemnitz, Germany

Toni Wirsing (10 July 1990) is a former Grand Prix motorcycle racer from Chemnitz, Germany. In 2008, he competed in the European 250cc Championship. That year, he trained for the 2009 Motorcycle World Championship with Dirk Heidolf's Racing Team Germany, but left the team prior to the World Cup. In 2009, he rode a superbike for the first time. For 2010, he joined the Sport-Evolution BMW Motorcycle Junior Team to compete at IDM Superbike.

== Career statistics ==
=== By season ===
Season	Class	Motorcycle	Team	Number	Race	Win	Podium	Pole	FLap	Pts	Plcd
2006	125cc	Honda	Honda Schumann Reisen	98	1	0	0	0	0	0	NC
2007	125cc	Honda	Honda Schumann Reisen	94	1	0	0	0	0	0	NC
2008	250cc	Honda	Racing Team Germany	94	4	0	0	0	0	2	27th
Total					6	0	0	0	0	2	

=== Races by year ===
Year	Class	Bike	1	2	3	4	5	6	7	8	9	10	11	12	13	14	15	16	17	Pos	Points
2006	125cc	Honda	SPA	QAT	TUR	CHN	FRA	ITA	CAT	NED	GBR	GER; 32	CZE	MAL	AUS	JPN	POR	VAL		NC	0
2007	125cc	Honda	QAT	SPA	TUR	CHN	FRA	ITA	CAT	GBR	NED	GER	CZE; 25	RSM	POR	JPN	AUS	MAL	VAL	NC	0
2008	250cc	Honda	QAT	SPA	POR	CHN	FRA	ITA	CAT	GBR	NED	GER; 20	CZE; 20	RSM; 14	INP	JPN	AUS	MAL	VAL; Ret	27th	2
