= Russell Gómez =

Spanish motorcycle racer

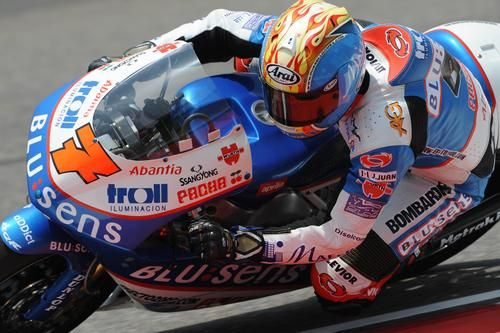
- Gómez on an Aprilia
- Nationality: Spanish
- Born: Russell Gómez Martín; 17 November 1987 (age 38); Barcelona, Spain

Russell Gómez Martín (born 17 November 1987) is a former Grand Prix motorcycle racer from Spain. He was the winner of the 2007 and 2010 24 Hours of Catalunya.

== Career statistics ==
=== Grand Prix motorcycle racing ===
==== By season ====
Season	Class	Motorcycle	Team	Race	Win	Podium	Pole	FLap	Pts	Plcd
2008	250cc	Aprilia	Blusens Aprilia	9	0	0	0	0	0	NC
Total				**9**	**0**	**0**	**0**	**0**	**0**	

==== Races by year ====
(key) (Races in bold indicate pole position, races in italics indicate fastest lap)

Year	Class	Bike	1	2	3	4	5	6	7	8	9	10	11	12	13	14	15	16	17	Pos	Pts
2008	250cc	Aprilia	QAT	SPA	POR; Ret	CHN; 17	FRA; 19	ITA; 16	CAT; 17	GBR; 18	NED; Ret	GER; Ret	CZE; 21	RSM	INP	JPN	AUS	MAL	VAL	NC	0
