= Julián Miralles =

Spanish motorcycle racer

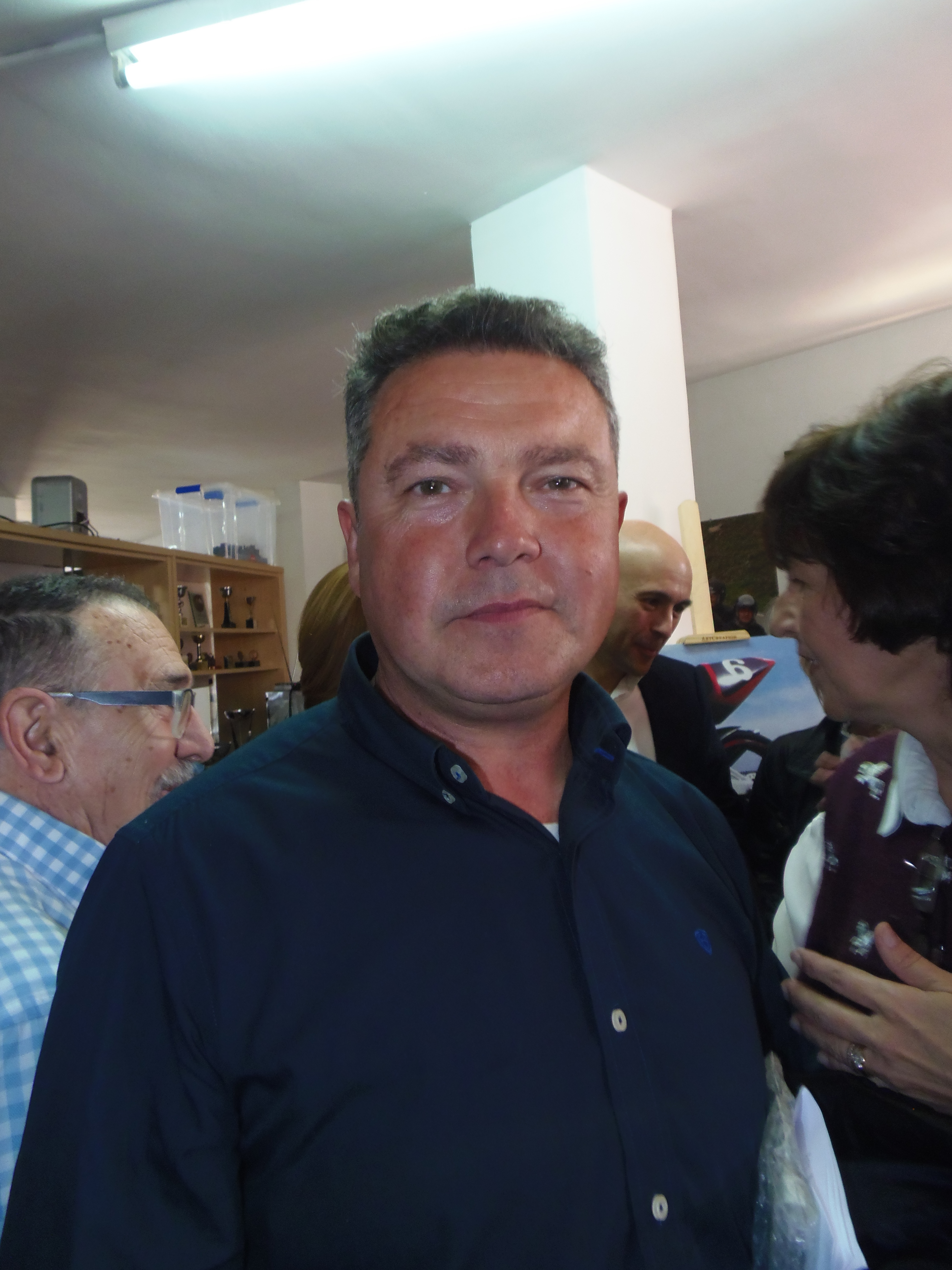
- Former motorcycle racer
- Nationality: Spanish
- Born: 18 September 1965 (age 61); Alberic, Spain

Julián Miralles (born 16 September 1965) is a Spanish former Grand Prix motorcycle racer and director of the Cuna de Campeones motorcycling academy. His son, Julián Miralles Rodríguez, is also a motorcycle racer. He was the 1987 European 80cc Champion.

== Career statistics ==
=== By season ===
| Season | Class | Motorcycle | Race | Win | Podium | Pole | FLap | Pts | Plcd |
|---|---|---|---|---|---|---|---|---|---|
| 1987 | 80cc | Derbi | 3 | 0 | 1 | 0 | 0 | 18 | 10th |
| 1988 | 125cc | Honda | 11 | 0 | 5 | 0 | 0 | 104 | 4th |
| 1989 | 80cc | Derbi | 2 | 0 | 0 | 0 | 0 | 26 | 12th |
| 1989 | 125cc | Derbi | 11 | 0 | 3 | 0 | 0 | 90 | 8th |
| 1990 | 125cc | JJ Cobas | 14 | 0 | 0 | 0 | 0 | 46 | 13th |
| 1991 | 125cc | Honda | 12 | 0 | 0 | 0 | 0 | 10 | 27th |
| 1992 | 125cc | Honda | 12 | 0 | 0 | 0 | 0 | 0 | NC |
| 1993 | 125cc | Honda | 14 | 0 | 0 | 0 | 0 | 4 | 32nd |
| 1994 | 500cc | ROC-Yamaha | 8 | 0 | 0 | 0 | 0 | 7 | 26th |
| Total | | | 87 | 0 | 9 | 0 | 0 | 305 | |
