= Saeed Al Sulaiti =

Qatari motorcycle racer (born 1985)

- Nationality: (Qatar) Qatari
- Born: 21 March 1985 (age 41); Doha, Qatar
Motorcycle racing career statistics
Moto2 World Championship
Active years	2017
Manufacturers	Speed Up
2017 championship position	NC (0 pts)
Starts / Wins / Podiums / Poles / F. laps / Points; 1 / 0 / 0 / 0 / 0 / 0
Superbike World Championship
Active years	2016
Manufacturers	Kawasaki
2016 championship position	34th (1 pt)
Starts / Wins / Podiums / Poles / F. laps / Points; 24 / 0 / 0 / 0 / 0 / 1
Supersport World Championship
Active years	2017, 2019
Manufacturers	Kawasaki, Yamaha
2019 championship position	NC (0 pts)
Starts / Wins / Podiums / Poles / F. laps / Points; 2 / 0 / 0 / 0 / 0 / 0

Saeed Al Sulaiti (born 21 March 1985) is a Qatari motorcycle racer. He made his Grand Prix debut in the Moto2 class as a wild-card rider in the 2017 Qatar Grand Prix.

== Career statistics ==
=== Superbike World Championship ===
==== Races by year ====
(key)

Year	Bike	1		2		3		4		5		6		7		8		9		10		11		12		13		Pos.	Pts
Year	Bike	R1	R2	R1	R2	R1	R2	R1	R2	R1	R2	R1	R2	R1	R2	R1	R2	R1	R2	R1	R2	R1	R2	R1	R2	R1	R2	Pos.	Pts
2016	Kawasaki	AUS; 17	AUS; 17	THA; 17	THA; Ret	SPA; Ret	SPA; 21	NED; DNQ	NED; DNQ	ITA; Ret	ITA; 16	MAL; 17	MAL; 20	GBR; 17	GBR; Ret	ITA; 19	ITA; 19	USA; Ret	USA; 15	GER; Ret	GER; Ret	FRA; 18	FRA; Ret	SPA; Ret	SPA; Ret	QAT; 17	QAT; Ret	34th	1

=== Grand Prix motorcycle racing ===
==== By season ====
Season	Class	Motorcycle	Team	Race	Win	Podium	Pole	FLap	Pts	Plcd
2017	Moto2	Speed Up	QMMF Racing	1	0	0	0	0	0	NC
Total				1	0	0	0	0	0	

==== Races by year ====
(key)

Year	Class	Bike	1	2	3	4	5	6	7	8	9	10	11	12	13	14	15	16	17	18	Pos.	Pts
2017	Moto2	Speed Up	QAT; Ret	ARG	AME	SPA	FRA	ITA	CAT	NED	GER	CZE	AUT	GBR	RSM	ARA	JPN	AUS	MAL	VAL	NC	0

=== Supersport World Championship ===
==== Races by year ====
(key)

Year	Bike	1	2	3	4	5	6	7	8	9	10	11	12	Pos.	Pts
2017	Kawasaki	AUS	THA	SPA	NED	ITA	GBR	ITA	GER	POR	FRA	SPA	QAT; Ret	NC	0
2019	Yamaha	AUS	THA	SPA	NED	ITA	SPA	ITA	GBR	POR	FRA	ARG	QAT; 17	NC	0
