= Carmelo Morales =

Spanish motorcycle racer

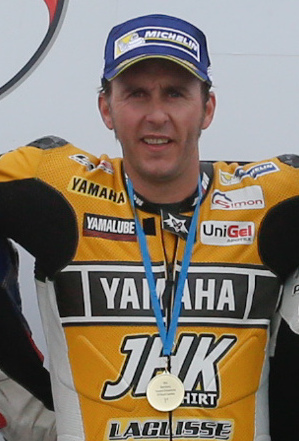
- Morales in 2016
- Nationality: Spanish
- Born: 7 July 1978 (age 48); Castellar del Vallès, Spain
Motorcycle racing career statistics
Moto2 World Championship
| Active years | 2010–2011 |
| Manufacturers | Pons Kalex, Suter, Moriwaki |
| Championships | 0 |
| 2011 championship position | NC (0 pts) |
Starts / Wins / Podiums / Poles / F. laps / Points; 10 / 0 / 0 / 0 / 0 / 0
Superbike World Championship
| Active years | 2007–2008 |
| Manufacturers | Yamaha |
| Championships | 0 |
| 2008 championship position | NC (0 pts) |
Starts / Wins / Podiums / Poles / F. laps / Points; 4 / 0 / 0 / 0 / 0 / 2

Carmelo Morales Gómez (born 7 July 1978) is a Spanish former motorcycle racer.

During his racing career, Morales won the 24 Hours of Catalunya in 2003, the Spanish Extreme/Stock Extreme Championship three times (in 2008, 2009 and 2012), won the Spanish Moto2 Championship once (in 2010), the European Superstock title three times (in 2008, 2009 and 2012), the European Supersport title once (in 2010), the FIM CEV Superbike European Championship twice (in 2015 and 2016) and the Spanish Superstock 1000 Championship twice (in 2017 and 2018).

Morales announced his retirement in 2022 after a successful career in Spain.

== Career statistics ==
=== Grand Prix World Championship ===
==== By season ====
| Season | Class | Motorcycle | Team | Race | Win | Podium | Pole | FLap | Pts | Plcd |
|---|---|---|---|---|---|---|---|---|---|---|
| 2010 | Moto2 | Pons Kalex | Tenerife 40 Pons | 1 | 0 | 0 | 0 | 0 | 0 | NC |
| 2010 | Moto2 | Suter | Racing Team Germany | 2 | 0 | 0 | 0 | 0 | 0 | NC |
| 2011 | Moto2 | Moriwaki | Desguaces La Torre SAG | 6 | 0 | 0 | 0 | 0 | 0 | NC |
| 2011 | Moto2 | Suter | Desguaces La Torre SAG | 1 | 0 | 0 | 0 | 0 | 0 | NC |
| Total | | | | **10** | **0** | **0** | **0** | **0** | **0** | |

==== Races by year ====
(key) (Races in bold indicate pole position, races in italics indicate fastest lap)

| Year | Class | Bike | 1 | 2 | 3 | 4 | 5 | 6 | 7 | 8 | 9 | 10 | 11 | 12 | 13 | 14 | 15 | 16 | 17 | Pos | Pts |
|---|---|---|---|---|---|---|---|---|---|---|---|---|---|---|---|---|---|---|---|---|---|
| 2010 | Moto2 | Pons Kalex | QAT | SPA | FRA | ITA | GBR | NED | CAT; Ret | GER | CZE | INP | RSM | ARA | JPN | MAL | AUS | | | NC | 0 |
| 2010 | Moto2 | Suter | | | | | | | | | | | | | | | | POR; 20 | VAL; Ret | NC | 0 |
| 2011 | Moto2 | Moriwaki | QAT | SPA | POR | FRA | CAT; 18 | GBR; Ret | NED; 20 | ITA; 25 | | | INP; Ret | RSM; Ret | ARA | JPN | AUS | MAL | VAL | NC | 0 |
| 2011 | Moto2 | Suter | | | | | | | | | GER; DNS | CZE; Ret | | | | | | | | NC | 0 |

=== Superbike World Championship ===
==== Races by year ====
(key) (Races in bold indicate pole position, races in italics indicate fastest lap)

| Year | Bike | 1 | | 2 | | 3 | | 4 | | 5 | | 6 | | 7 | | 8 | | 9 | | 10 | | 11 | | 12 | | 13 | | 14 | | Pos | Pts |
| Year | Bike | R1 | R2 | R1 | R2 | R1 | R2 | R1 | R2 | R1 | R2 | R1 | R2 | R1 | R2 | R1 | R2 | R1 | R2 | R1 | R2 | R1 | R2 | R1 | R2 | R1 | R2 | R1 | R2 | Pos | Pts |
|---|---|---|---|---|---|---|---|---|---|---|---|---|---|---|---|---|---|---|---|---|---|---|---|---|---|---|---|---|---|---|---|
| 2007 | Yamaha | QAT | QAT | AUS | AUS | EUR | EUR | SPA; Ret | SPA; 14 | NED | NED | ITA | ITA | GBR | GBR | SMR | SMR | CZE | CZE | GBR | GBR | GER | GER | ITA | ITA | FRA | FRA | | | 30th | 2 |
| 2008 | Yamaha | QAT | QAT | AUS | AUS | SPA; Ret | SPA; 25 | NED | NED | ITA | ITA | USA | USA | GER | GER | SMR | SMR | CZE | CZE | GBR | GBR | EUR | EUR | ITA | ITA | FRA | FRA | POR | POR | NC | 0 |
