= Dani Rivas =

Spanish motorcycle racer

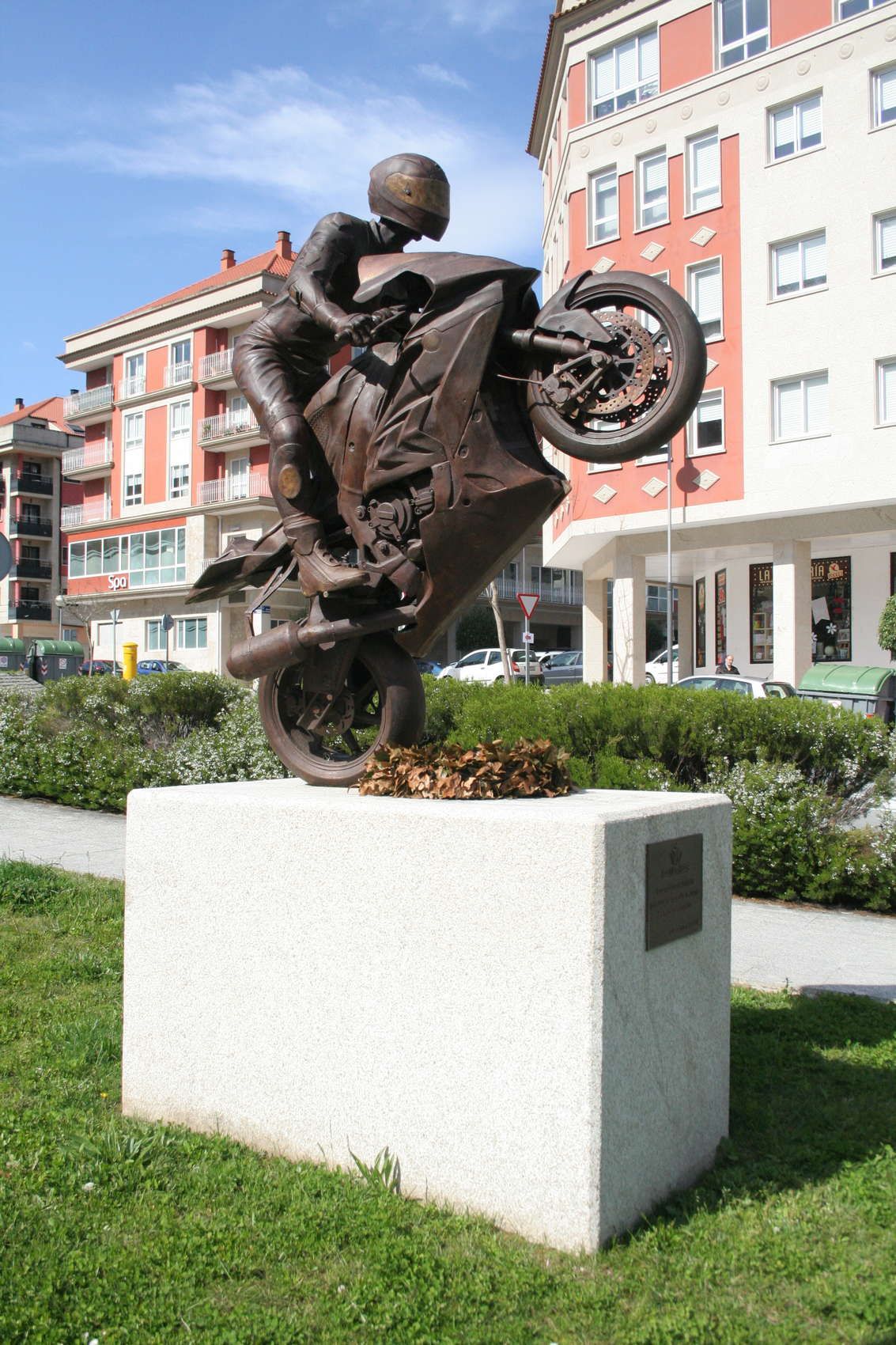
- Monument to Dani Rivas in Moaña, Spain
- Nationality: Spanish
- Born: 13 March 1988; Moaña, Spain
- Died: 19 July 2015 (aged 27); Salinas, California, United States
Motorcycle racing career statistics
Moto2 World Championship
Active years	2010, 2012–2013
Manufacturers	Promoharris, BQR-Moto2, Kalex
Championships	0
2013 championship position	NC (0 pts)
Starts / Wins / Podiums / Poles / F. laps / Points; 6 / 0 / 0 / 0 / 0 / 3

Daniel Rivas Fernández (13 March 1988 – 19 July 2015) was a Spanish motorcycle racer. At an international level, he competed in the European Superstock 600 Championship, the Superstock 1000 FIM Cup and the Moto2 World Championship. He died on July 19, 2015, along with Bernat Martínez due to injuries sustained in an accident in Laguna Seca.

== Career statistics ==
- 2011 - 31st, FIM Superstock 1000 Cup, Kawasaki ZX-10R

=== European Superstock 600 ===
==== Races by year ====
(key) (Races in bold indicate pole position, races in italics indicate fastest lap)

Year	Bike	1	2	3	4	5	6	7	8	9	10	Pos	Pts
2005	Honda	VAL; 17	MNZ; 10	SIL; 20	MIS; 8	BRN; 6	BRA; 9	ASS; 6	LAU; 11	IMO; 10	MAG; 10	7th	58

=== Superstock 1000 Cup ===
==== Races by year ====
(key) (Races in bold indicate pole position) (Races in italics indicate fastest lap)

Year	Bike	1	2	3	4	5	6	7	8	9	10	Pos	Pts
2011	Kawasaki	NED	MNZ	SMR	ARA	BRN	SIL	NŰR	IMO; 17	MAG; 28	ALG; 15	31st	1

=== Grand Prix motorcycle racing ===
==== By season ====
Season	Class	Motorcycle	Team	Number	Race	Win	Podium	Pole	FLap	Pts	Plcd
2010	Moto2	Promoharris	MR Griful	7	1	0	0	0	0	0	NC
2010	Moto2	BQR-Moto2	Blusens-STX	7	1	0	0	0	0	0	NC
2012	Moto2	Kalex	TSR Galicia School	17	1	0	0	0	0	3	29th
2013	Moto2	Kalex	TSR Motorsports	27	3	0	0	0	0	0	NC
2013	Moto2	Kalex	Blusens Avintia	27	3	0	0	0	0	0	NC
Total					**6**	**0**	**0**	**0**	**0**	**3**	

=== Races by year ===
(key)

Year	Class	Team	1	2	3	4	5	6	7	8	9	10	11	12	13	14	15	16	17	Pos	Pts
2010	Moto2	Promoharris	QAT	SPA	FRA	ITA	GBR	NED	CAT; Ret	GER	CZE	INP	RSM	ARA	JPN	MAL	AUS			NC	0
2010	Moto2	BQR-Moto2																POR; Ret	VAL	NC	0
2012	Moto2	Kalex	QAT	SPA	POR	FRA	CAT	GBR	NED	GER	ITA	INP	CZE	RSM	ARA	JPN	MAL	AUS	VAL; 13	29th	3
2013	Moto2	Kalex	QAT	AME	SPA; Ret	FRA	ITA	CAT; 19	NED	GER	INP	CZE; 21	GBR; DNS	RSM	ARA	MAL	AUS	JPN	VAL	NC	0
