= Harris Performance Products =

English motorcycle racing manufacturer

Harris Performance Products Limited
- Type: Limited Company
- Industry: Motorcycle
- Founded: 1972
- Founder: Lester Harris; Steve Harris
- Headquarters: Hertford, Hertfordshire, England
- Key people: Lester Harris, Steve Harris, Steve Bayford, Cary Ford.
- Products: Motorcycles and racing parts
- Services: Consultancy
- Parent: Eicher Motors via subsidiary Royal Enfield

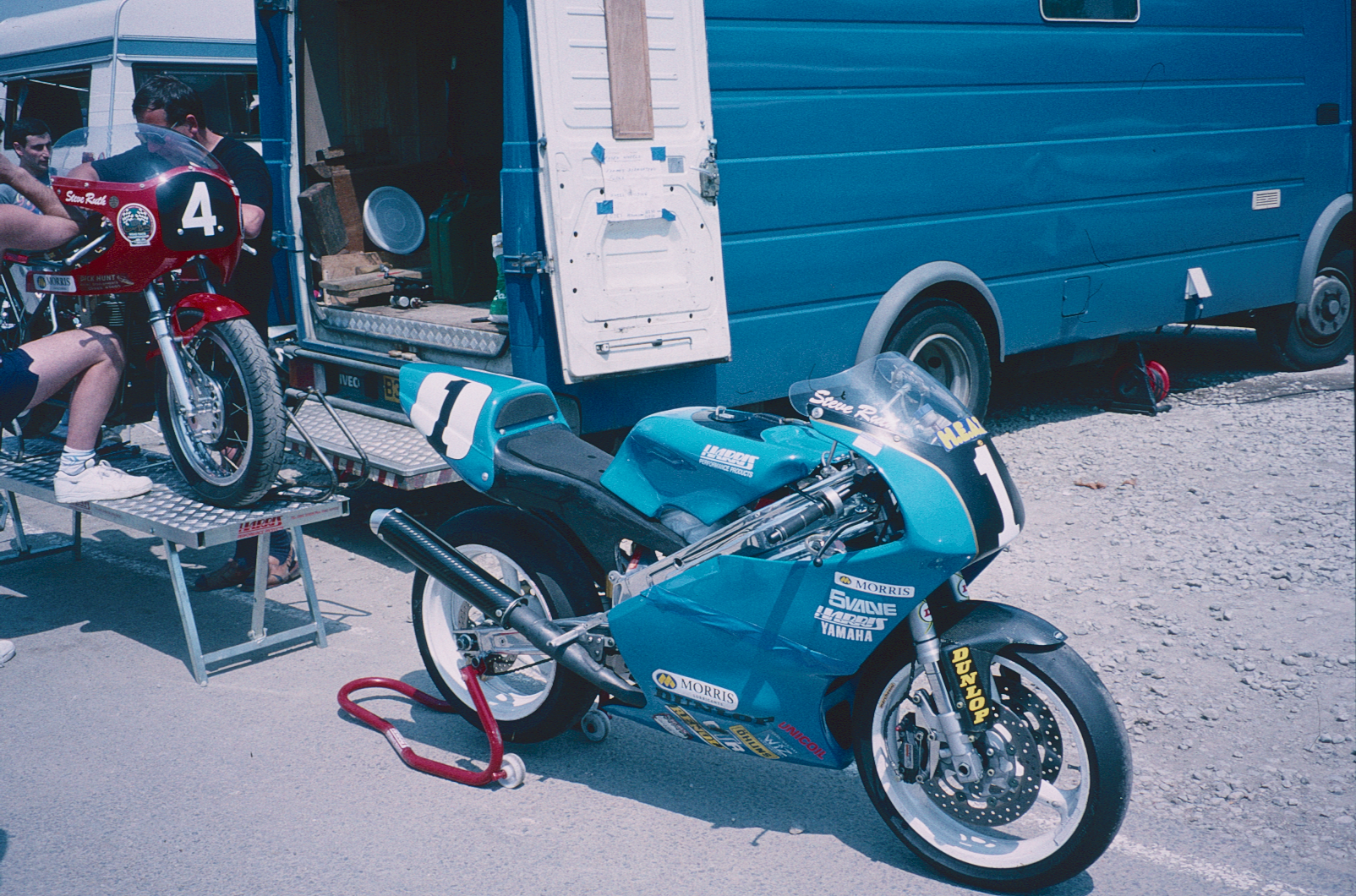
Harris-Yamaha at Brands Hatch in 1995

Harris Performance Products are a British-based motorcycle racing and parts manufacturer. The business started in Roydon, Essex, England making replacement chassis for road racing, housing Yamaha TZ350 and TZ250 engines using a monoshock rear suspension layout. It was absorbed in 2015 by Eicher Motors, a conglomerate specialising in vehicle production, based in India.

== Background ==
The family-run company Harris Performance Products is based in Hertford and designs, develops, manufactures and markets road and racing motorcycle chassis and components. The company was established in 1972 by Lester and Steve Harris, with a third director Stephen Bayford.

Over 2,200 road bikes have been produced and sold from one-off specials to the Harris Magnum range. This included approximately 20 Laverda-based Magnums, amongst others. Harris motorcycles have been successful in all classes of road racing including Grand Prix, Superbike World Championship, World Championship Endurance, Isle of Man TT and top Irish road races. In 1991, the company became one of only two companies worldwide to be licensed by Yamaha to buy factory race engines for installation in Harris designed and built chassis for the blue ribbon 500 cc Grand Prix World Championship class. Harris is a technical partner to the official Yamaha UK Supermoto team.

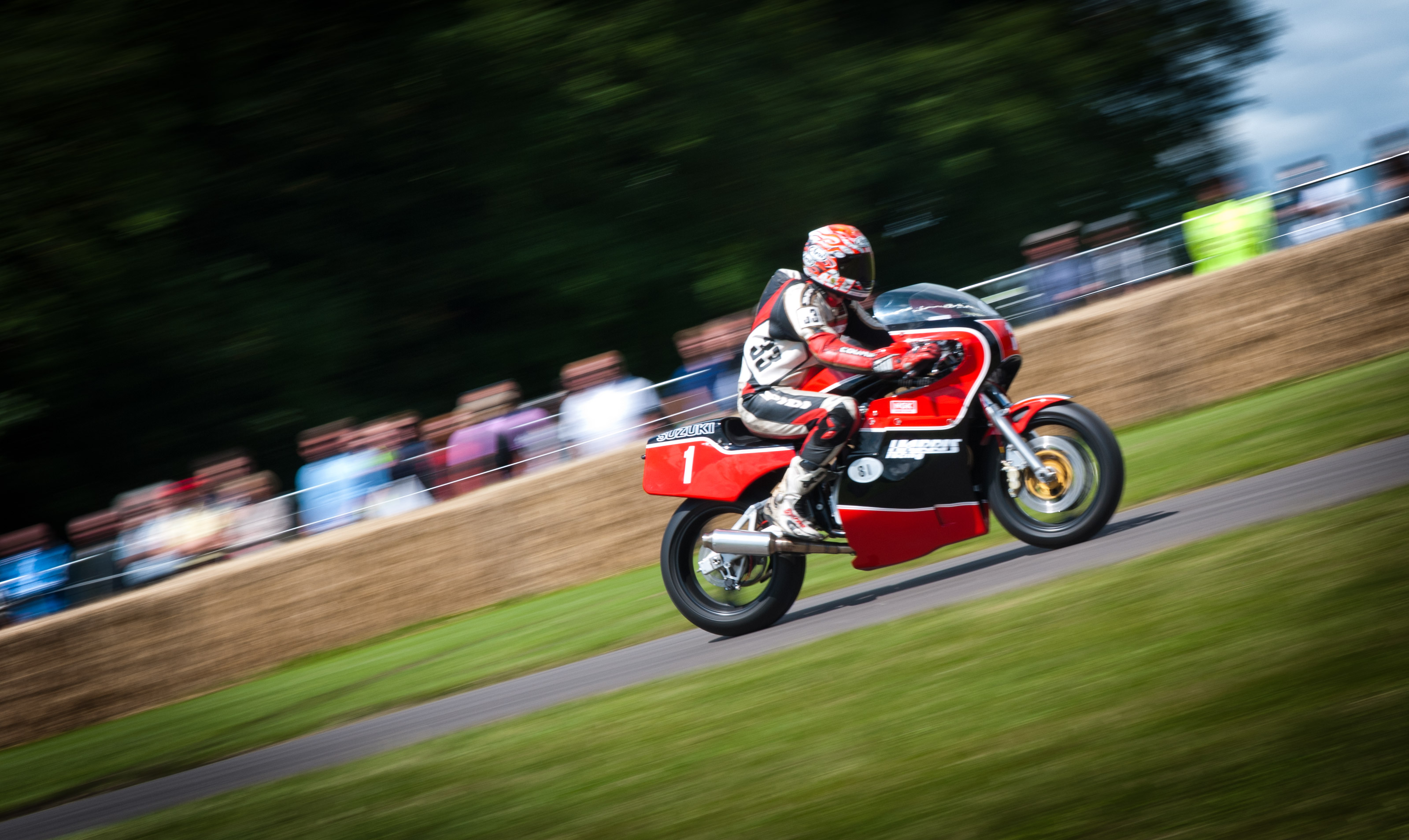
Harris-Suzuki F1 at Goodwood FOS in 2012

Their Harris Yamaha 500 GP machines which were produced from 1992 onwards. They ran the official Suzuki Factory World Superbike Team in 1996‚ 1997 and 1998.

In 2003 Harris Performance teamed up with World Championship Motorsports (WCM) to build new racing bikes under the name "Harris WCM". The FIM initially banned their motorcycle from competing after their engines did not conform FIM rules and the team was forced to run modified two-stroke, ten-year old Yamaha motorcycles until a compliant engine was ready at the 2003 Portuguese motorcycle Grand Prix, but the partnership lasted until 2005, when a technical partnership with Blata fell through.

In 2015, Royal Enfield, a subsidiary of Eicher Motors, India-based motor vehicle manufacturers, acquired Harris Performance for an undisclosed sum. The company had a long relationship with Royal Enfield and was responsible for the chassis development of the brand's models Continental GT cafe racer and the Himalayan ADV bike.
