= List of career achievements by Marc Márquez =

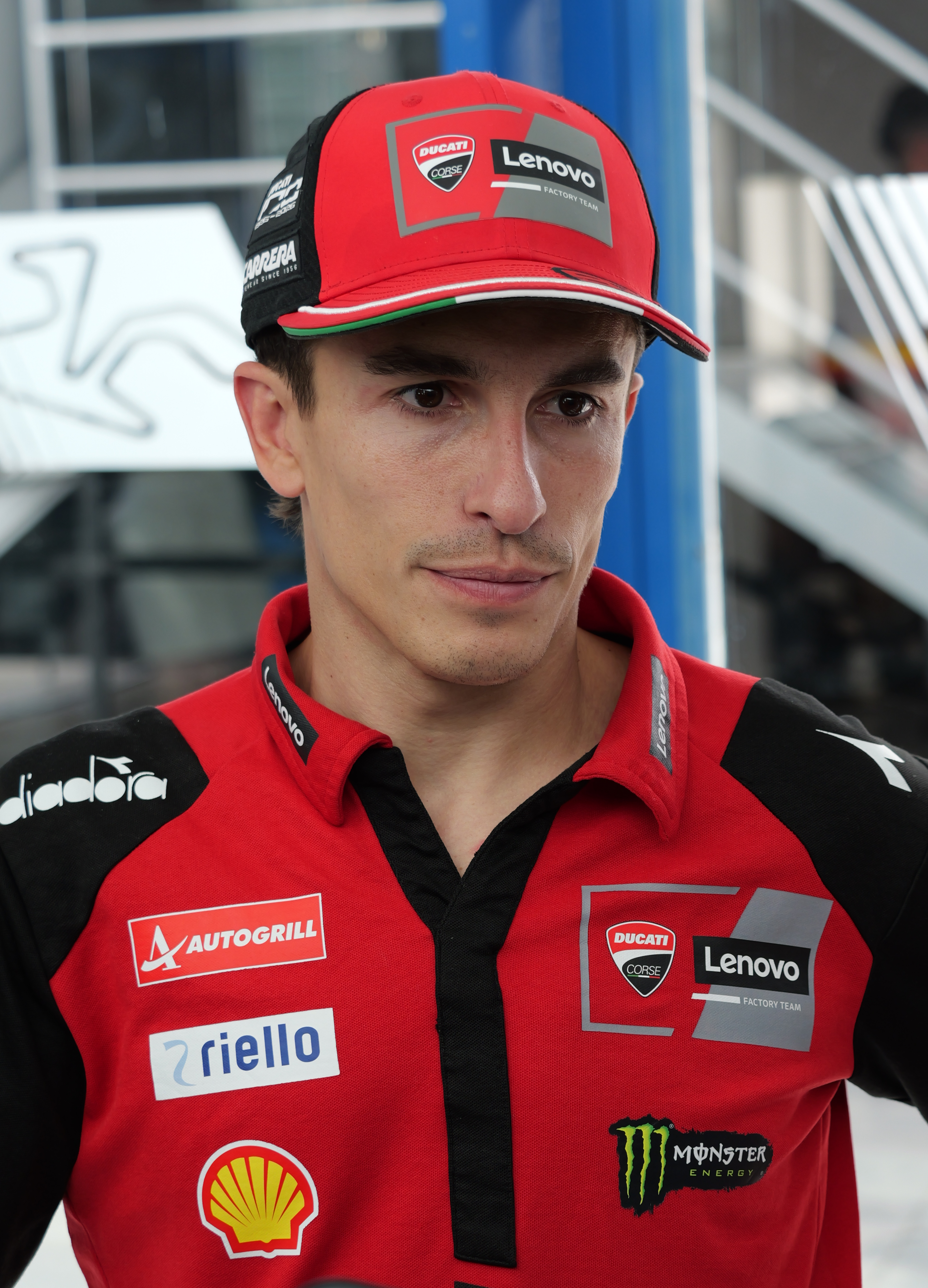
Márquez at the 2026 Spanish Grand Prix

This is a list of career achievements of Marc Márquez.

== Wins ==
Key:

- No. – Victory number.
- Race – Motorcycle Grand Prix career race start number.
- Grid – Starting position on grid.
- Margin – Margin of victory (min:sec.ms).
- † – Rider's Championship winning season.

Grand Prix victories
No.	Race	Date	Class	Season	Grand Prix	Circuit	Grid	Margin	Team	Manufacturer	Motorcycle	Ref
1	33	6 June 2010	125 cc	2010^{†}	Italian	Mugello Circuit	6	0:00.039	Red Bull Ajo Motorsport	Derbi	Derbi RSA 125	
2	34	20 June 2010	125 cc	2010^{†}	British	Silverstone Circuit	1	0:02.576	Red Bull Ajo Motorsport	Derbi	Derbi RSA 125	
3	35	26 June 2010	125 cc	2010^{†}	Dutch	TT Circuit Assen	1	0:02.332	Red Bull Ajo Motorsport	Derbi	Derbi RSA 125	
4	36	4 July 2010	125 cc	2010^{†}	Catalan	Circuit de Barcelona-Catalunya	1	0:04.638	Red Bull Ajo Motorsport	Derbi	Derbi RSA 125	
5	37	18 July 2010	125 cc	2010^{†}	German	Sachsenring	1	0:17.578	Red Bull Ajo Motorsport	Derbi	Derbi RSA 125	
6	40	5 September 2010	125 cc	2010^{†}	San Marino and Rimini Riviera	Misano World Circuit Marco Simoncelli	2	0:02.185	Red Bull Ajo Motorsport	Derbi	Derbi RSA 125	
7	42	3 October 2010	125 cc	2010^{†}	Japanese	Mobility Resort Motegi	1	0:02.612	Red Bull Ajo Motorsport	Derbi	Derbi RSA 125	
8	43	10 October 2010	125 cc	2010^{†}	Malaysian	Sepang International Circuit	1	0:02.341	Red Bull Ajo Motorsport	Derbi	Derbi RSA 125	
9	44	17 October 2010	125 cc	2010^{†}	Australian	Phillip Island Grand Prix Circuit	1	0:06.062	Red Bull Ajo Motorsport	Derbi	Derbi RSA 125	
10	45	31 October 2010	125 cc	2010^{†}	Portuguese	Circuito do Estoril	11	0:00.150	Red Bull Ajo Motorsport	Derbi	Derbi RSA 125	
11	50	15 May 2011	Moto2	2011	French	Bugatti Circuit	6	0:01.982	Team CatalunyaCaixa Repsol	Suter	Suter MMXI	
12	53	25 June 2011	Moto2	2011	Dutch	TT Circuit Assen	2	0:02.397	Team CatalunyaCaixa Repsol	Suter	Suter MMXI	
13	54	3 July 2011	Moto2	2011	Italian	Mugello Circuit	1	0:00.071	Team CatalunyaCaixa Repsol	Suter	Suter MMXI	
14	55	17 July 2011	Moto2	2011	German	Sachsenring	1	0:00.896	Team CatalunyaCaixa Repsol	Suter	Suter MMXI	
15	57	28 August 2011	Moto2	2011	Indianapolis	Indianapolis Motor Speedway	1	0:01.889	Team CatalunyaCaixa Repsol	Suter	Suter MMXI	
16	58	4 September 2011	Moto2	2011	San Marino and Rimini Riviera	Misano World Circuit Marco Simoncelli	2	0:00.619	Team CatalunyaCaixa Repsol	Suter	Suter MMXI	
17	59	18 September 2011	Moto2	2011	Aragon	MotorLand Aragón	1	0:02.466	Team CatalunyaCaixa Repsol	Suter	Suter MMXI	
18	62	8 April 2012	Moto2	2012^{†}	Qatar	Lusail International Circuit	2	0:00.061	Team CatalunyaCaixa Repsol	Suter	Suter MMXII	
19	64	6 May 2012	Moto2	2012^{†}	Portuguese	Circuito do Estoril	1	0:01.987	Team CatalunyaCaixa Repsol	Suter	Suter MMXII	
20	68	30 June 2012	Moto2	2012^{†}	Dutch	TT Circuit Assen	1	0:00.405	Team CatalunyaCaixa Repsol	Suter	Suter MMXII	
21	69	8 July 2012	Moto2	2012^{†}	German	Sachsenring	1	0:02.093	Team CatalunyaCaixa Repsol	Suter	Suter MMXII	
22	71	19 August 2012	Moto2	2012^{†}	Indianapolis	Indianapolis Motor Speedway	2	0:05.855	Team CatalunyaCaixa Repsol	Suter	Suter MMXII	
23	72	26 August 2012	Moto2	2012^{†}	Czech Republic	Brno Circuit	4	0:00.061	Team CatalunyaCaixa Repsol	Suter	Suter MMXII	
24	73	16 September 2012	Moto2	2012^{†}	San Marino and Rimini Riviera	Misano World Circuit Marco Simoncelli	1	0:00.359	Team CatalunyaCaixa Repsol	Suter	Suter MMXII	
25	75	14 October 2012	Moto2	2012^{†}	Japanese	Mobility Resort Motegi	2	0:00.415	Team CatalunyaCaixa Repsol	Suter	Suter MMXII	
26	78	11 November 2012	Moto2	2012^{†}	Valencian Community	Circuit Ricardo Tormo	33 (Note: Back of the grid start penalty. Qualifying position: 2nd.)	0:01.256	Team CatalunyaCaixa Repsol	Suter	Suter MMXII	
27	80	21 April 2013	MotoGP	2013^{†}	Americas	Circuit of the Americas	1	0:01.534	Repsol Honda Team	Honda	Honda RC213V	
28	86	14 July 2013	MotoGP	2013^{†}	German	Sachsenring	1	0:01.559	Repsol Honda Team	Honda	Honda RC213V	
29	87	21 July 2013	MotoGP	2013^{†}	United States	WeatherTech Raceway Laguna Seca	2	0:02.298	Repsol Honda Team	Honda	Honda RC213V	
30	88	18 August 2013	MotoGP	2013^{†}	Indianapolis	Indianapolis Motor Speedway	1	0:03.495	Repsol Honda Team	Honda	Honda RC213V	
31	89	25 August 2013	MotoGP	2013^{†}	Czech Republic	Brno Circuit	3	0:00.313	Repsol Honda Team	Honda	Honda RC213V	
32	92	29 September 2013	MotoGP	2013^{†}	Aragon	MotorLand Aragón	1	0:01.356	Repsol Honda Team	Honda	Honda RC213V	
33	97	23 March 2014	MotoGP	2014^{†}	Qatar	Lusail International Circuit	1	0:00.259	Repsol Honda Team	Honda	Honda RC213V	
34	98	13 April 2014	MotoGP	2014^{†}	Americas	Circuit of the Americas	1	0:04.124	Repsol Honda Team	Honda	Honda RC213V	
35	99	27 April 2014	MotoGP	2014^{†}	Argentine Republic	Autódromo Termas de Río Hondo	1	0:01.827	Repsol Honda Team	Honda	Honda RC213V	
36	100	4 May 2014	MotoGP	2014^{†}	Spanish	Circuito de Jerez – Ángel Nieto	1	0:01.431	Repsol Honda Team	Honda	Honda RC213V	
37	101	18 May 2014	MotoGP	2014^{†}	French	Bugatti Circuit	1	0:01.486	Repsol Honda Team	Honda	Honda RC213V	
38	102	1 June 2014	MotoGP	2014^{†}	Italian	Mugello Circuit	1	0:00.121	Repsol Honda Team	Honda	Honda RC213V	
39	103	15 June 2014	MotoGP	2014^{†}	Catalan	Circuit de Barcelona-Catalunya	3	0:00.512	Repsol Honda Team	Honda	Honda RC213V	
40	104	28 June 2014	MotoGP	2014^{†}	Dutch	TT Circuit Assen	2	0:06.714	Repsol Honda Team	Honda	Honda RC213V	
41	105	13 July 2014	MotoGP	2014^{†}	German	Sachsenring	1	0:01.466	Repsol Honda Team	Honda	Honda RC213V	
42	106	10 August 2014	MotoGP	2014^{†}	Indianapolis	Indianapolis Motor Speedway	1	0:01.803	Repsol Honda Team	Honda	Honda RC213V	
43	108	31 August 2014	MotoGP	2014^{†}	British	Silverstone Circuit	1	0:00.732	Repsol Honda Team	Honda	Honda RC213V	
44	113	26 October 2014	MotoGP	2014^{†}	Malaysian	Sepang International Circuit	1	0:02.445	Repsol Honda Team	Honda	Honda RC213V	
45	114	9 November 2014	MotoGP	2014^{†}	Valencian Community	Circuit Ricardo Tormo	5	0:03.516	Repsol Honda Team	Honda	Honda RC213V	
46	116	12 April 2015	MotoGP	2015	Americas	Circuit of the Americas	1	0:02.354	Repsol Honda Team	Honda	Honda RC213V	
47	123	12 July 2015	MotoGP	2015	German	Sachsenring	1	0:02.226	Repsol Honda Team	Honda	Honda RC213V	
48	124	9 August 2015	MotoGP	2015	Indianapolis	Indianapolis Motor Speedway	1	0:00.688	Repsol Honda Team	Honda	Honda RC213V	
49	127	13 September 2015	MotoGP	2015	San Marino and Rimini Riviera	Misano World Circuit Marco Simoncelli	2	0:07.288	Repsol Honda Team	Honda	Honda RC213V	
50	130	18 October 2015	MotoGP	2015	Australian	Phillip Island Grand Prix Circuit	1	0:00.249	Repsol Honda Team	Honda	Honda RC213V	
51	134	3 April 2016	MotoGP	2016^{†}	Argentine Republic	Autódromo Termas de Río Hondo	1	0:07.679	Repsol Honda Team	Honda	Honda RC213V	
52	135	10 April 2016	MotoGP	2016^{†}	Americas	Circuit of the Americas	1	0:06.107	Repsol Honda Team	Honda	Honda RC213V	
53	141	17 July 2016	MotoGP	2016^{†}	German	Sachsenring	1	0:09.857	Repsol Honda Team	Honda	Honda RC213V	
54	146	25 September 2016	MotoGP	2016^{†}	Aragon	MotorLand Aragón	1	0:02.740	Repsol Honda Team	Honda	Honda RC213V	
55	147	16 October 2016	MotoGP	2016^{†}	Japanese	Mobility Resort Motegi	2	0:02.992	Repsol Honda Team	Honda	Honda RC213V	
56	153	23 April 2017	MotoGP	2017^{†}	Americas	Circuit of the Americas	1	0:03.069	Repsol Honda Team	Honda	Honda RC213V	
57	159	2 July 2017	MotoGP	2017^{†}	German	Sachsenring	1	0:03.310	Repsol Honda Team	Honda	Honda RC213V	
58	160	6 August 2017	MotoGP	2017^{†}	Czech Republic	Brno Circuit	1	0:12.438	Repsol Honda Team	Honda	Honda RC213V	
59	163	10 September 2017	MotoGP	2017^{†}	San Marino and Rimini Riviera	Misano World Circuit Marco Simoncelli	3	0:01.192	Repsol Honda Team	Honda	Honda RC213V	
60	164	24 September 2017	MotoGP	2017^{†}	Aragon	MotorLand Aragón	5	0:00.879	Repsol Honda Team	Honda	Honda RC213V	
61	166	22 October 2017	MotoGP	2017^{†}	Australian	Phillip Island Grand Prix Circuit	1	0:01.799	Repsol Honda Team	Honda	Honda RC213V	
62	171	22 April 2018	MotoGP	2018^{†}	Americas	Circuit of the Americas	4 (Note: 3-place grid penalty. Qualifying position: 1st.)	0:03.560	Repsol Honda Team	Honda	Honda RC213V	
63	172	6 May 2018	MotoGP	2018^{†}	Spanish	Circuito de Jerez – Ángel Nieto	5	0:05.241	Repsol Honda Team	Honda	Honda RC213V	
64	173	20 May 2018	MotoGP	2018^{†}	French	Bugatti Circuit	2	0:02.310	Repsol Honda Team	Honda	Honda RC213V	
65	176	1 July 2018	MotoGP	2018^{†}	Dutch	TT Circuit Assen	1	0:02.269	Repsol Honda Team	Honda	Honda RC213V	
66	177	15 July 2018	MotoGP	2018^{†}	German	Sachsenring	1	0:02.196	Repsol Honda Team	Honda	Honda RC213V	
67	181	23 September 2018	MotoGP	2018^{†}	Aragon	MotorLand Aragón	3	0:00.648	Repsol Honda Team	Honda	Honda RC213V	
68	182	7 October 2018	MotoGP	2018^{†}	Thailand	Chang International Circuit	1	0:00.115	Repsol Honda Team	Honda	Honda RC213V	
69	183	21 October 2018	MotoGP	2018^{†}	Japanese	Mobility Resort Motegi	6	0:01.573	Repsol Honda Team	Honda	Honda RC213V	
70	185	4 November 2018	MotoGP	2018^{†}	Malaysian	Sepang International Circuit	7 (Note: 6-place grid penalty. Qualifying position: 1st.)	0:01.898	Repsol Honda Team	Honda	Honda RC213V	
71	188	31 March 2019	MotoGP	2019^{†}	Argentine Republic	Autódromo Termas de Río Hondo	1	0:09.816	Repsol Honda Team	Honda	Honda RC213V	
72	190	5 May 2019	MotoGP	2019^{†}	Spanish	Circuito de Jerez – Ángel Nieto	3	0:01.654	Repsol Honda Team	Honda	Honda RC213V	
73	191	19 May 2019	MotoGP	2019^{†}	French	Bugatti Circuit	1	0:01.984	Repsol Honda Team	Honda	Honda RC213V	
74	193	16 June 2019	MotoGP	2019^{†}	Catalan	Circuit de Barcelona-Catalunya	2	0:02.660	Repsol Honda Team	Honda	Honda RC213V	
75	195	7 July 2019	MotoGP	2019^{†}	German	Sachsenring	1	0:04.587	Repsol Honda Team	Honda	Honda RC213V	
76	196	4 August 2019	MotoGP	2019^{†}	Czech Republic	Brno Circuit	1	0:02.452	Repsol Honda Team	Honda	Honda RC213V	
77	199	15 September 2019	MotoGP	2019^{†}	San Marino and Rimini Riviera	Misano World Circuit Marco Simoncelli	5	0:00.903	Repsol Honda Team	Honda	Honda RC213V	
78	200	22 September 2019	MotoGP	2019^{†}	Aragon	MotorLand Aragón	1	0:04.836	Repsol Honda Team	Honda	Honda RC213V	
79	201	6 October 2019	MotoGP	2019^{†}	Thailand	Chang International Circuit	3	0:00.171	Repsol Honda Team	Honda	Honda RC213V	
80	202	20 October 2019	MotoGP	2019^{†}	Japanese	Mobility Resort Motegi	1	0:00.870	Repsol Honda Team	Honda	Honda RC213V	
81	203	27 October 2019	MotoGP	2019^{†}	Australian	Phillip Island Grand Prix Circuit	3	0:11.413	Repsol Honda Team	Honda	Honda RC213V	
82	205	17 November 2019	MotoGP	2019^{†}	Valencian Community	Circuit Ricardo Tormo	2	0:01.026	Repsol Honda Team	Honda	Honda RC213V	
83	212	20 June 2021	MotoGP	2021	German	Sachsenring	5	0:01.610	Repsol Honda Team	Honda	Honda RC213V	
84	219	3 October 2021	MotoGP	2021	Americas	Circuit of the Americas	3	0:04.679	Repsol Honda Team	Honda	Honda RC213V	
85	220	24 October 2021	MotoGP	2021	Emilia Romagna	Misano World Circuit Marco Simoncelli	7	0:04.859	Repsol Honda Team	Honda	Honda RC213V	
86	259	1 September 2024	MotoGP	2024	Aragon	MotorLand Aragón	1	0:04.789	Gresini Racing MotoGP	Ducati	Ducati Desmosedici GP23	
87	260	8 September 2024	MotoGP	2024	San Marino and Rimini Riviera	Misano World Circuit Marco Simoncelli	9	0:03.102	Gresini Racing MotoGP	Ducati	Ducati Desmosedici GP23	
88	264	20 October 2024	MotoGP	2024	Australian	Phillip Island Grand Prix Circuit	2	0:00.997	Gresini Racing MotoGP	Ducati	Ducati Desmosedici GP23	
89	268	2 March 2025	MotoGP	2025^{†}	Thailand	Chang International Circuit	1	0:01.732	Ducati Lenovo Team	Ducati	Ducati Desmosedici GP25	
90	269	16 March 2025	MotoGP	2025^{†}	Argentine	Autódromo Termas de Río Hondo	1	0:01.362	Ducati Lenovo Team	Ducati	Ducati Desmosedici GP25	
91	271	13 April 2025	MotoGP	2025^{†}	Qatar	Lusail International Circuit	1	0:04.535	Ducati Lenovo Team	Ducati	Ducati Desmosedici GP25	
92	275	8 June 2025	MotoGP	2025^{†}	Aragon	MotorLand Aragón	1	0:01.107	Ducati Lenovo Team	Ducati	Ducati Desmosedici GP25	
93	276	22 June 2025	MotoGP	2025^{†}	Italian	Mugello Circuit	1	0:01.942	Ducati Lenovo Team	Ducati	Ducati Desmosedici GP25	
94	277	29 June 2025	MotoGP	2025^{†}	Dutch	TT Circuit Assen	4	0:00.635	Ducati Lenovo Team	Ducati	Ducati Desmosedici GP25	
95	278	13 July 2025	MotoGP	2025^{†}	German	Sachsenring	1	0:06.380	Ducati Lenovo Team	Ducati	Ducati Desmosedici GP25	
96	279	20 July 2025	MotoGP	2025^{†}	Czech Republic	Brno Circuit	2	0:01.753	Ducati Lenovo Team	Ducati	Ducati Desmosedici GP25	
97	280	17 August 2025	MotoGP	2025^{†}	Austrian	Red Bull Ring	4	0:01.118	Ducati Lenovo Team	Ducati	Ducati Desmosedici GP25	
98	281	24 August 2025	MotoGP	2025^{†}	Hungarian	Balaton Park Circuit	1	0:04.314	Ducati Lenovo Team	Ducati	Ducati Desmosedici GP25	
99	283	14 September 2025	MotoGP	2025^{†}	San Marino and Rimini Riviera	Misano World Circuit Marco Simoncelli	4	0:00.568	Ducati Lenovo Team	Ducati	Ducati Desmosedici GP25	
100	291	7 June 2026	MotoGP	2026^{†}	Hungarian	Balaton Park Circuit	1	0:01.343	Ducati Lenovo Team	Ducati	Ducati Desmosedici GP26	
101	292	21 June 2026	MotoGP	2026^{†}	Czech Republic	Brno Circuit	4 (Note: Marco Bezzecchi qualified in 4th place but was excluded from the race. Qualifying position: 5th.)	0:00.421	Ducati Lenovo Team	Ducati	Ducati Desmosedici GP26	
102	294	12 July 2026	MotoGP	2026^{†}	German	Sachsenring	1	0:01.996	Ducati Lenovo Team	Ducati	Ducati Desmosedici GP26	
103	296	30 August 2026	MotoGP	2026^{†}	Aragon	MotorLand Aragón	2	0:01.754	Ducati Lenovo Team	Ducati	Ducati Desmosedici GP26	
104	297	13 September 2026	MotoGP	2026^{†}	San Marino and Rimini Riviera	Misano World Circuit Marco Simoncelli	2	0:00.657	Ducati Lenovo Team	Ducati	Ducati Desmosedici GP26	
105	299	4 October 2026	MotoGP	2026^{†}	Japanese	Mobility Resort Motegi	2	0:01.363	Ducati Lenovo Team	Ducati	Ducati Desmosedici GP26	
106	301	1 November 2026	MotoGP	2026^{†}	Malaysian	Sepang International Circuit	2	0:04.172	Ducati Lenovo Team	Ducati	Ducati Desmosedici GP26	

=== Number of wins at different Grands Prix ===
No.	Grand Prix	Years won	Wins
1	German Grand Prix	2010, 2011, 2012, 2013, 2014, 2015, 2016, 2017, 2018, 2019, 2021, 2025, 2026	13
2	Aragon Grand Prix	2011, 2013, 2016, 2017, 2018, 2019, 2024, 2025, 2026	9
3	San Marino and Rimini Riviera Grand Prix	2010, 2011, 2012, 2015, 2017, 2019, 2024, 2025, 2026	9
4	Grand Prix of the Americas	2013, 2014, 2015, 2016, 2017, 2018, 2021	7
5	Dutch TT	2010, 2011, 2012, 2014, 2018, 2025	6
6	Czech Republic Grand Prix	2012, 2013, 2017, 2019, 2025, 2026	6
7	Japanese Grand Prix	2010, 2012, 2016, 2018, 2019, 2026	6
8	Indianapolis Grand Prix	2011, 2012, 2013, 2014, 2015	5
9	Australian Grand Prix	2010, 2015, 2017, 2019, 2024	5
10	French Grand Prix	2011, 2014, 2018, 2019	4
11	Argentine Grand Prix	2014, 2016, 2019, 2025	4
12	Italian Grand Prix	2010, 2011, 2014, 2025	4
13	Malaysian Grand Prix	2010, 2014, 2018, 2026	4
14	Spanish Grand Prix	2014, 2018, 2019	3
15	Catalan Grand Prix	2010, 2014, 2019	3
16	Valencian Community Grand Prix	2012, 2014, 2019	3
17	Thailand Grand Prix	2018, 2019, 2025	3
18	Qatar Grand Prix	2012, 2014, 2025	3
19	Portuguese Grand Prix	2010, 2012	2
20	British Grand Prix	2010, 2014	2
21	Hungarian Grand Prix	2025, 2026	2
22	United States Grand Prix	2013	1
23	Emilia Romagna Grand Prix	2021	1
24	Austrian Grand Prix	2025	1
Total number of Grand Prix wins:			106

=== Number of wins at different circuits ===
No.	Circuit	Years won	Wins
1	Sachsenring	2010, 2011, 2012, 2013, 2014, 2015, 2016, 2017, 2018, 2019, 2021, 2025, 2026	13
2	Misano World Circuit Marco Simoncelli	2010, 2011, 2012, 2015, 2017, 2019, 2021, 2024, 2025, 2026	10
3	MotorLand Aragón	2011, 2013, 2016, 2017, 2018, 2019, 2024, 2025, 2026	9
4	Circuit of the Americas	2013, 2014, 2015, 2016, 2017, 2018, 2021	7
5	TT Circuit Assen	2010, 2011, 2012, 2014, 2018, 2025	6
6	Brno Circuit	2012, 2013, 2017, 2019, 2025, 2026	6
7	Mobility Resort Motegi	2010, 2012, 2016, 2018, 2019, 2026	6
8	Indianapolis Motor Speedway	2011, 2012, 2013, 2014, 2015	5
9	Phillip Island Grand Prix Circuit	2010, 2015, 2017, 2019, 2024	5
10	Bugatti Circuit	2011, 2014, 2018, 2019	4
11	Autódromo Termas de Río Hondo	2014, 2016, 2019, 2025	4
12	Mugello Circuit	2010, 2011, 2014, 2025	4
13	Sepang International Circuit	2010, 2014, 2018, 2026	4
14	Circuito de Jerez – Ángel Nieto	2014, 2018, 2019	3
15	Circuit de Barcelona-Catalunya	2010, 2014, 2019	3
16	Circuit Ricardo Tormo	2012, 2014, 2019	3
17	Chang International Circuit	2018, 2019, 2025	3
18	Lusail International Circuit	2012, 2014, 2025	3
19	Circuito do Estoril	2010, 2012	2
20	Silverstone Circuit	2010, 2014	2
21	Balaton Park Circuit	2025, 2026	2
22	WeatherTech Raceway Laguna Seca	2013	1
23	Red Bull Ring	2025	1
Total number of Grand Prix wins:			106

== Poles ==
Key:

- No. – Pole number.
- Margin – Margin of pole (min:sec.ms).
- Final – Final position on the race.
- † – Rider's Championship winning season.

Grand Prix poles
No.	Date	Class	Season	Grand Prix	Circuit	Time	Margin	Final	Team	Manufacturer	Motorcycle	Ref
1	16 May 2009	125 cc	2009	French	Bugatti Circuit	1:47.080	0:00.093	Ret	Red Bull KTM Motorsport	KTM	KTM 125 FRR	
2	24 October 2009	125 cc	2009	Malaysian	Sepang International Circuit	2:13.756	0:00.055	Ret	Red Bull KTM Motorsport	KTM	KTM 125 FRR	
3	10 April 2010	125 cc	2010^{†}	Qatar	Lusail International Circuit	2:06.651	0:00.459	3	Red Bull Ajo Motorsport	Derbi	Derbi RSA 125	
4	1 May 2010	125 cc	2010^{†}	Spanish	Circuito de Jerez – Ángel Nieto	1:46.829	0:00.104	Ret	Red Bull Ajo Motorsport	Derbi	Derbi RSA 125	
5	19 June 2010	125 cc	2010^{†}	British	Silverstone Circuit	2:14.667	0:00.299	1	Red Bull Ajo Motorsport	Derbi	Derbi RSA 125	
6	25 June 2010	125 cc	2010^{†}	Dutch	TT Circuit Assen	1:42.191	0:00.584	1	Red Bull Ajo Motorsport	Derbi	Derbi RSA 125	
7	3 July 2010	125 cc	2010^{†}	Catalan	Circuit de Barcelona-Catalunya	1:50.543	0:00.266	1	Red Bull Ajo Motorsport	Derbi	Derbi RSA 125	
8	17 July 2010	125 cc	2010^{†}	German	Sachsenring	1:26.053	0:00.543	1	Red Bull Ajo Motorsport	Derbi	Derbi RSA 125	
9	28 August 2010	125 cc	2010^{†}	Indianapolis	Indianapolis Motor Speedway	1:48.124	0:00.479	10	Red Bull Ajo Motorsport	Derbi	Derbi RSA 125	
10	18 September 2010	125 cc	2010^{†}	Aragon	MotorLand Aragón	1:59.335	0:00.563	Ret	Red Bull Ajo Motorsport	Derbi	Derbi RSA 125	
11	2 October 2010	125 cc	2010^{†}	Japanese	Mobility Resort Motegi	1:58.030	0:00.417	1	Red Bull Ajo Motorsport	Derbi	Derbi RSA 125	
12	9 October 2010	125 cc	2010^{†}	Malaysian	Sepang International Circuit	2:13.398	0:00.293	1	Red Bull Ajo Motorsport	Derbi	Derbi RSA 125	
13	16 October 2010	125 cc	2010^{†}	Australian	Phillip Island Grand Prix Circuit	1:38.236	0:00.616	1	Red Bull Ajo Motorsport	Derbi	Derbi RSA 125	
14	6 November 2010	125 cc	2010^{†}	Valencian Community	Circuit Ricardo Tormo	1:39.564	0:00.108	4	Red Bull Ajo Motorsport	Derbi	Derbi RSA 125	
15	11 June 2011	Moto2	2011	British	Silverstone Circuit	2:08.101	0:00.497	Ret	Team CatalunyaCaixa Repsol	Suter	Suter MMXI	
16	2 July 2011	Moto2	2011	Italian	Mugello Circuit	2:05.312	0:00.585	1	Team CatalunyaCaixa Repsol	Suter	Suter MMXI	
17	16 July 2011	Moto2	2011	German	Sachsenring	1:24.733	0:00.129	1	Team CatalunyaCaixa Repsol	Suter	Suter MMXI	
18	13 August 2011	Moto2	2011	Czech Republic	Brno Circuit	2:02.493	0:00.211	2	Team CatalunyaCaixa Repsol	Suter	Suter MMXI	
19	27 August 2011	Moto2	2011	Indianapolis	Indianapolis Motor Speedway	1:44.038	0:00.001	1	Team CatalunyaCaixa Repsol	Suter	Suter MMXI	
20	17 September 2011	Moto2	2011	Aragon	MotorLand Aragón	1:53.296	0:00.684	1	Team CatalunyaCaixa Repsol	Suter	Suter MMXI	
21	1 October 2011	Moto2	2011	Japanese	Mobility Resort Motegi	1:52.067	0:00.193	2	Team CatalunyaCaixa Repsol	Suter	Suter MMXI	
22	28 April 2012	Moto2	2012^{†}	Spanish	Circuito de Jerez – Ángel Nieto	1:43.005	0:00.080	2	Team CatalunyaCaixa Repsol	Suter	Suter MMXII	
23	5 May 2012	Moto2	2012^{†}	Portuguese	Circuito do Estoril	1:40.934	0:00.120	1	Team CatalunyaCaixa Repsol	Suter	Suter MMXII	
24	19 May 2012	Moto2	2012^{†}	French	Bugatti Circuit	1:37.710	0:00.029	Ret	Team CatalunyaCaixa Repsol	Suter	Suter MMXII	
25	2 June 2012	Moto2	2012^{†}	Catalan	Circuit de Barcelona-Catalunya	1:46.187	0:00.195	3	Team CatalunyaCaixa Repsol	Suter	Suter MMXII	
26	29 June 2012	Moto2	2012^{†}	Dutch	TT Circuit Assen	1:37.133	0:00.455	1	Team CatalunyaCaixa Repsol	Suter	Suter MMXII	
27	7 July 2012	Moto2	2012^{†}	German	Sachsenring	1:34.503	0:00.045	1	Team CatalunyaCaixa Repsol	Suter	Suter MMXII	
28	15 September 2012	Moto2	2012^{†}	San Marino and Rimini Riviera	Misano World Circuit Marco Simoncelli	1:38.242	0:00.044	1	Team CatalunyaCaixa Repsol	Suter	Suter MMXII	
29	20 April 2013	MotoGP	2013^{†}	Americas	Circuit of the Americas	2:03.021	0:00.254	1	Repsol Honda Team	Honda	Honda RC213V	
30	18 May 2013	MotoGP	2013^{†}	French	Bugatti Circuit	1:33.187	0:00.030	3	Repsol Honda Team	Honda	Honda RC213V	
31	13 July 2013	MotoGP	2013^{†}	German	Sachsenring	1:21.311	0:00.123	1	Repsol Honda Team	Honda	Honda RC213V	
32	17 August 2013	MotoGP	2013^{†}	Indianapolis	Indianapolis Motor Speedway	1:37.958	0:00.513	1	Repsol Honda Team	Honda	Honda RC213V	
33	31 August 2013	MotoGP	2013^{†}	British	Silverstone Circuit	2:00.691	0:00.128	2	Repsol Honda Team	Honda	Honda RC213V	
34	14 September 2013	MotoGP	2013^{†}	San Marino and Rimini Riviera	Misano World Circuit Marco Simoncelli	1:32.915	0:00.513	2	Repsol Honda Team	Honda	Honda RC213V	
35	28 September 2013	MotoGP	2013^{†}	Aragon	MotorLand Aragón	1:47.804	0:00.010	1	Repsol Honda Team	Honda	Honda RC213V	
36	12 October 2013	MotoGP	2013^{†}	Malaysian	Sepang International Circuit	2:00.011	0:00.325	2	Repsol Honda Team	Honda	Honda RC213V	
37	9 November 2013	MotoGP	2013^{†}	Valencian Community	Circuit Ricardo Tormo	1:30.237	0:00.340	3	Repsol Honda Team	Honda	Honda RC213V	
38	22 March 2014	MotoGP	2014^{†}	Qatar	Lusail International Circuit	1:54.507	0:00.057	1	Repsol Honda Team	Honda	Honda RC213V	
39	12 April 2014	MotoGP	2014^{†}	Americas	Circuit of the Americas	2:02.773	0:00.289	1	Repsol Honda Team	Honda	Honda RC213V	
40	26 April 2014	MotoGP	2014^{†}	Argentine Republic	Autódromo Termas de Río Hondo	1:37.683	0:00.742	1	Repsol Honda Team	Honda	Honda RC213V	
41	3 May 2014	MotoGP	2014^{†}	Spanish	Circuito de Jerez – Ángel Nieto	1:38.120	0:00.421	1	Repsol Honda Team	Honda	Honda RC213V	
42	17 May 2014	MotoGP	2014^{†}	French	Bugatti Circuit	1:32.042	0:00.692	1	Repsol Honda Team	Honda	Honda RC213V	
43	31 May 2014	MotoGP	2014^{†}	Italian	Mugello Circuit	1:47.270	0:00.180	1	Repsol Honda Team	Honda	Honda RC213V	
44	12 July 2014	MotoGP	2014^{†}	German	Sachsenring	1:20.937	0:00.296	1	Repsol Honda Team	Honda	Honda RC213V	
45	9 August 2014	MotoGP	2014^{†}	Indianapolis	Indianapolis Motor Speedway	1:31.619	0:00.225	1	Repsol Honda Team	Honda	Honda RC213V	
46	16 August 2014	MotoGP	2014^{†}	Czech Republic	Brno Circuit	1:55.585	0:00.129	4	Repsol Honda Team	Honda	Honda RC213V	
47	30 August 2014	MotoGP	2014^{†}	British	Silverstone Circuit	2:00.829	0:00.311	1	Repsol Honda Team	Honda	Honda RC213V	
48	27 September 2014	MotoGP	2014^{†}	Aragon	MotorLand Aragón	1:47.187	0:00.362	13	Repsol Honda Team	Honda	Honda RC213V	
49	18 October 2014	MotoGP	2014^{†}	Australian	Phillip Island Grand Prix Circuit	1:28.408	0:00.234	Ret	Repsol Honda Team	Honda	Honda RC213V	
50	25 October 2014	MotoGP	2014^{†}	Malaysian	Sepang International Circuit	1:59.791	0:00.182	1	Repsol Honda Team	Honda	Honda RC213V	
51	11 April 2015	MotoGP	2015	Americas	Circuit of the Americas	2:02.135	0:00.339	1	Repsol Honda Team	Honda	Honda RC213V	
52	18 April 2015	MotoGP	2015	Argentine Republic	Autódromo Termas de Río Hondo	1:37.802	0:00.514	Ret	Repsol Honda Team	Honda	Honda RC213V	
53	16 May 2015	MotoGP	2015	French	Bugatti Circuit	1:32.246	0:00.503	4	Repsol Honda Team	Honda	Honda RC213V	
54	11 July 2015	MotoGP	2015	German	Sachsenring	1:20.336	0:00.292	1	Repsol Honda Team	Honda	Honda RC213V	
55	8 August 2015	MotoGP	2015	Indianapolis	Indianapolis Motor Speedway	1:31.884	0:00.171	1	Repsol Honda Team	Honda	Honda RC213V	
56	29 August 2015	MotoGP	2015	British	Silverstone Circuit	2:00.234	0:00.288	Ret	Repsol Honda Team	Honda	Honda RC213V	
57	26 September 2015	MotoGP	2015	Aragon	MotorLand Aragón	1:46.635	0:00.108	Ret	Repsol Honda Team	Honda	Honda RC213V	
58	17 October 2015	MotoGP	2015	Australian	Phillip Island Grand Prix Circuit	1:28.364	0:00.316	1	Repsol Honda Team	Honda	Honda RC213V	
59	2 April 2016	MotoGP	2016^{†}	Argentine Republic	Autódromo Termas de Río Hondo	1:39.411	0:00.375	1	Repsol Honda Team	Honda	Honda RC213V	
60	9 April 2016	MotoGP	2016^{†}	Americas	Circuit of the Americas	2:03.188	0:00.069	1	Repsol Honda Team	Honda	Honda RC213V	
61	4 June 2016	MotoGP	2016^{†}	Catalan	Circuit de Barcelona-Catalunya	1:43.589	0:00.467	2	Repsol Honda Team	Honda	Honda RC213V	
62	16 July 2016	MotoGP	2016^{†}	German	Sachsenring	1:21.160	0:00.412	1	Repsol Honda Team	Honda	Honda RC213V	
63	20 August 2016	MotoGP	2016^{†}	Czech Republic	Brno Circuit	1:54.596	0:00.253	3	Repsol Honda Team	Honda	Honda RC213V	
64	24 September 2016	MotoGP	2016^{†}	Aragon	MotorLand Aragón	1:47.117	0:00.631	1	Repsol Honda Team	Honda	Honda RC213V	
65	22 October 2016	MotoGP	2016^{†}	Australian	Phillip Island Grand Prix Circuit	1:30.189	0:00.792	Ret	Repsol Honda Team	Honda	Honda RC213V	
66	8 April 2017	MotoGP	2017^{†}	Argentine Republic	Autódromo Termas de Río Hondo	1:47.512	0:00.763	Ret	Repsol Honda Team	Honda	Honda RC213V	
67	22 April 2017	MotoGP	2017^{†}	Americas	Circuit of the Americas	2:02.741	0:00.130	1	Repsol Honda Team	Honda	Honda RC213V	
68	1 July 2017	MotoGP	2017^{†}	German	Sachsenring	1:27.302	0:00.160	1	Repsol Honda Team	Honda	Honda RC213V	
69	5 August 2017	MotoGP	2017^{†}	Czech Republic	Brno Circuit	1:54.981	0:00.092	1	Repsol Honda Team	Honda	Honda RC213V	
70	12 August 2017	MotoGP	2017^{†}	Austrian	Red Bull Ring	1:23.235	0:00.144	2	Repsol Honda Team	Honda	Honda RC213V	
71	26 August 2017	MotoGP	2017^{†}	British	Silverstone Circuit	1:59.941	0:00.084	Ret	Repsol Honda Team	Honda	Honda RC213V	
72	21 October 2017	MotoGP	2017^{†}	Australian	Phillip Island Grand Prix Circuit	1:28.386	0:00.333	1	Repsol Honda Team	Honda	Honda RC213V	
73	11 November 2017	MotoGP	2017^{†}	Valencian Community	Circuit Ricardo Tormo	1:29.897	0:00.349	3	Repsol Honda Team	Honda	Honda RC213V	
74	21 April 2018	MotoGP	2018^{†}	Americas	Circuit of the Americas	2:03.658	0:00.406	1	Repsol Honda Team	Honda	Honda RC213V	
75	30 June 2018	MotoGP	2018^{†}	Dutch	TT Circuit Assen	1:32.791	0:00.041	1	Repsol Honda Team	Honda	Honda RC213V	
76	14 July 2018	MotoGP	2018^{†}	German	Sachsenring	1:20.270	0:00.025	1	Repsol Honda Team	Honda	Honda RC213V	
77	11 August 2018	MotoGP	2018^{†}	Austrian	Red Bull Ring	1:23.241	0:00.002	2	Repsol Honda Team	Honda	Honda RC213V	
78	6 October 2018	MotoGP	2018^{†}	Thailand	Chang International Circuit	1:30.088	0:00.011	1	Repsol Honda Team	Honda	Honda RC213V	
79	27 October 2018	MotoGP	2018^{†}	Australian	Phillip Island Grand Prix Circuit	1:29.199	0:00.310	Ret	Repsol Honda Team	Honda	Honda RC213V	
80	3 November 2018	MotoGP	2018^{†}	Malaysian	Sepang International Circuit	2:12.161	0:00.548	1	Repsol Honda Team	Honda	Honda RC213V	
81	30 March 2019	MotoGP	2019^{†}	Argentine Republic	Autódromo Termas de Río Hondo	1:38.304	0:00.154	1	Repsol Honda Team	Honda	Honda RC213V	
82	13 April 2019	MotoGP	2019^{†}	Americas	Circuit of the Americas	2:03.787	0:00.273	Ret	Repsol Honda Team	Honda	Honda RC213V	
83	18 May 2019	MotoGP	2019^{†}	French	Bugatti Circuit	1:40.952	0:00.360	1	Repsol Honda Team	Honda	Honda RC213V	
84	1 June 2019	MotoGP	2019^{†}	Italian	Mugello Circuit	1:45.519	0:00.214	2	Repsol Honda Team	Honda	Honda RC213V	
85	6 July 2019	MotoGP	2019^{†}	German	Sachsenring	1:20.195	0:00.205	1	Repsol Honda Team	Honda	Honda RC213V	
86	3 August 2019	MotoGP	2019^{†}	Czech Republic	Brno Circuit	2:02.753	0:02.524	1	Repsol Honda Team	Honda	Honda RC213V	
87	10 August 2019	MotoGP	2019^{†}	Austrian	Red Bull Ring	1:23.027	0:00.434	2	Repsol Honda Team	Honda	Honda RC213V	
88	24 August 2019	MotoGP	2019^{†}	British	Silverstone Circuit	1:58.168	0:00.428	2	Repsol Honda Team	Honda	Honda RC213V	
89	21 September 2019	MotoGP	2019^{†}	Aragon	MotorLand Aragón	1:47.009	0:00.327	1	Repsol Honda Team	Honda	Honda RC213V	
90	19 October 2019	MotoGP	2019^{†}	Japanese	Mobility Resort Motegi	1:45.763	0:00.132	1	Repsol Honda Team	Honda	Honda RC213V	
91	24 September 2022	MotoGP	2022	Japanese	Mobility Resort Motegi	1:55.214	0:00.208	4	Repsol Honda Team	Honda	Honda RC213V	
92	25 March 2023	MotoGP	2023	Portuguese	Algarve International Circuit	1:37.226	0:00.064	Ret^{3}	Repsol Honda Team	Honda	Honda RC213V	
93	27 April 2024	MotoGP	2024	Spanish	Circuito de Jerez – Ángel Nieto	1:46.773	0:00.271	2^{6}	Gresini Racing MotoGP	Ducati	Ducati Desmosedici GP23	
94	31 August 2024	MotoGP	2024	Aragon	MotorLand Aragón	1:46.766	0:00.840	1^{1}	Gresini Racing MotoGP	Ducati	Ducati Desmosedici GP23	
95	1 March 2025	MotoGP	2025^{†}	Thailand	Chang International Circuit	1:28.782	0:00.146	1^{1}	Ducati Lenovo Team	Ducati	Ducati Desmosedici GP25	
96	15 March 2025	MotoGP	2025^{†}	Argentine	Autódromo Termas de Río Hondo	1:36.917	0:00.246	1^{1}	Ducati Lenovo Team	Ducati	Ducati Desmosedici GP25	
97	29 March 2025	MotoGP	2025^{†}	Americas	Circuit of the Americas	2:01.088	0:00.101	Ret^{1}	Ducati Lenovo Team	Ducati	Ducati Desmosedici GP25	
98	12 April 2025	MotoGP	2025^{†}	Qatar	Lusail International Circuit	1:50.499	0:00.101	1^{1}	Ducati Lenovo Team	Ducati	Ducati Desmosedici GP25	
99	7 June 2025	MotoGP	2025^{†}	Aragon	MotorLand Aragón	1:45.704	0:00.260	1^{1}	Ducati Lenovo Team	Ducati	Ducati Desmosedici GP25	
100	21 June 2025	MotoGP	2025^{†}	Italian	Mugello Circuit	1:44.169	0:00.059	1^{1}	Ducati Lenovo Team	Ducati	Ducati Desmosedici GP25	
101	12 July 2025	MotoGP	2025^{†}	German	Sachsenring	1:27.811	0:00.151	1^{1}	Ducati Lenovo Team	Ducati	Ducati Desmosedici GP25	
102	23 August 2025	MotoGP	2025^{†}	Hungarian	Balaton Park Circuit	1:36.518	0:00.290	1^{1}	Ducati Lenovo Team	Ducati	Ducati Desmosedici GP25	
103	25 April 2026	MotoGP	2026^{†}	Spanish	Circuito de Jerez – Ángel Nieto	1:48.087	0:00.140	Ret^{1}	Ducati Lenovo Team	Ducati	Ducati Desmosedici GP26	
104	6 June 2026	MotoGP	2026^{†}	Hungarian	Balaton Park Circuit	1:36.785	0:00.053	1^{1}	Ducati Lenovo Team	Ducati	Ducati Desmosedici GP26	
105	11 July 2026	MotoGP	2026^{†}	German	Sachsenring	1:19.041	0:00.061	1^{1}	Ducati Lenovo Team	Ducati	Ducati Desmosedici GP26	
106	24 October 2026	MotoGP	2026^{†}	Australian	Phillip Island Grand Prix Circuit	1:34.203	0:01.494	C^{1}	Ducati Lenovo Team	Ducati	Ducati Desmosedici GP26	

=== Number of poles at different Grands Prix ===
No.	Grand Prix	Years won pole	Poles
1	German Grand Prix	2010, 2011, 2012, 2013, 2014, 2015, 2016, 2017, 2018, 2019, 2025, 2026	12
2	Aragon Grand Prix	2010, 2011, 2013, 2014, 2015, 2016, 2019, 2024, 2025	9
3	Grand Prix of the Americas	2013, 2014, 2015, 2016, 2017, 2018, 2019, 2025	8
4	British Grand Prix	2010, 2011, 2013, 2014, 2015, 2017, 2019	7
5	Australian Grand Prix	2010, 2014, 2015, 2016, 2017, 2018, 2026	7
6	French Grand Prix	2009, 2012, 2013, 2014, 2015, 2019	6
7	Argentine Grand Prix	2014, 2015, 2016, 2017, 2019, 2025	6
8	Indianapolis Grand Prix	2010, 2011, 2013, 2014, 2015	5
9	Malaysian Grand Prix	2009, 2010, 2013, 2014, 2018	5
10	Czech Republic Grand Prix	2011, 2014, 2016, 2017, 2019	5
11	Spanish Grand Prix	2010, 2012, 2014, 2024, 2026	5
12	Japanese Grand Prix	2010, 2011, 2019, 2022	4
13	Italian Grand Prix	2011, 2014, 2019, 2025	4
14	Catalan Grand Prix	2010, 2012, 2016	3
15	Valencian Community Grand Prix	2010, 2013, 2017	3
16	Dutch TT	2010, 2012, 2018	3
17	Austrian Grand Prix	2017, 2018, 2019	3
18	Qatar Grand Prix	2010, 2014, 2025	3
19	San Marino and Rimini Riviera Grand Prix	2012, 2013	2
20	Portuguese Grand Prix	2012, 2023	2
21	Thailand Grand Prix	2018, 2025	2
22	Hungarian Grand Prix	2025, 2026	2
Total number of Grand Prix poles:			106

=== Number of poles at different circuits ===
No.	Circuit	Years won pole	Poles
1	Sachsenring	2010, 2011, 2012, 2013, 2014, 2015, 2016, 2017, 2018, 2019, 2025, 2026	12
2	MotorLand Aragón	2010, 2011, 2013, 2014, 2015, 2016, 2019, 2024, 2025	9
3	Circuit of the Americas	2013, 2014, 2015, 2016, 2017, 2018, 2019, 2025	8
4	Silverstone Circuit	2010, 2011, 2013, 2014, 2015, 2017, 2019	7
5	Phillip Island Grand Prix Circuit	2010, 2014, 2015, 2016, 2017, 2018, 2026	7
6	Bugatti Circuit	2009, 2012, 2013, 2014, 2015, 2019	6
7	Autódromo Termas de Río Hondo	2014, 2015, 2016, 2017, 2019, 2025	6
8	Indianapolis Motor Speedway	2010, 2011, 2013, 2014, 2015	5
9	Sepang International Circuit	2009, 2010, 2013, 2014, 2018	5
10	Brno Circuit	2011, 2014, 2016, 2017, 2019	5
11	Circuito de Jerez – Ángel Nieto	2010, 2012, 2014, 2024, 2026	5
12	Mobility Resort Motegi	2010, 2011, 2019, 2022	4
13	Mugello Circuit	2011, 2014, 2019, 2025	4
14	Circuit de Barcelona-Catalunya	2010, 2012, 2016	3
15	Circuit Ricardo Tormo	2010, 2013, 2017	3
16	TT Circuit Assen	2010, 2012, 2018	3
17	Red Bull Ring	2017, 2018, 2019	3
18	Lusail International Circuit	2010, 2014, 2025	3
19	Misano World Circuit Marco Simoncelli	2012, 2013	2
20	Chang International Circuit	2018, 2025	2
21	Balaton Park Circuit	2025, 2026	2
22	Circuito do Estoril	2012	1
23	Algarve International Circuit	2023	1
Total number of Grand Prix poles:			106

== See also ==
- List of Grand Prix motorcycle racing rider records
- List of 500cc/MotoGP rider records
- List of Grand Prix motorcycle racing winners
- List of 500cc/MotoGP race winners
- List of 500cc/MotoGP polesitters
- List of 500cc/MotoGP riders who set a fastest lap
