= Marco Ravaioli =

Italian motorcycle racer (born 1989)

- Nationality: Italian
- Born: 29 July 1989 (age 37); Cesena, Italy
Motorcycle racing career statistics
125cc World Championship
Active years	2008, 2010
Manufacturers	Aprilia, Lambretta
Starts / Wins / Podiums / Poles / F. laps / Points; 22 / 0 / 0 / 0 / 0 / 0

Marco Ravaioli (born 29 July 1989) is an Italian motorcycle racer. He has competed in the 125cc World Championship, the Italian CIV 125GP Championship and the Italian CIV Superstock 600 Championship.

== Career statistics ==
2011 - NC, European Superstock 600 Championship, Yamaha YZF-R6

=== Grand Prix motorcycle racing ===
==== By season ====
Season	Class	Motorcycle	Team	Race	Win	Podium	Pole	FLap	Pts	Plcd
2008	125cc	Aprilia	Matteoni Racing	8	0	0	0	0	0	NC
2010	125cc	Lambretta	Lambretta Reparto Corse	14	0	0	0	0	0	NC
Total				**22**	**0**	**0**	**0**	**0**	**0**	

==== Races by year ====
Year	Class	Bike	1	2	3	4	5	6	7	8	9	10	11	12	13	14	15	16	17	Pos.	Pts
2008	125cc	Aprilia	QAT	SPA	POR	CHN	FRA	ITA	CAT	GBR	NED	GER; 23	CZE; 22	RSM; 17	INP; Ret	JPN; 21	AUS; 16	MAL; 18	VAL; 20	NC	0
2010	125cc	Lambretta	QAT; Ret	SPA; 22	FRA; Ret	ITA; Ret	GBR; Ret	NED; Ret	CAT; 22	GER; Ret	CZE; 21	INP; 16	RSM; 23	ARA; 18	JPN; DNS	MAL; 18	AUS; DNQ	POR; DNQ	VAL; Ret	NC	0

=== European Superstock 600 ===
==== Races by year ====
(key) (Races in bold indicate pole position, races in italics indicate fastest lap)

Year	Bike	1	2	3	4	5	6	7	8	9	10	Pos	Pts
2011	Yamaha	ASS	MNZ	MIS; DNS	ARA	BRN	SIL	NÜR	IMO	MAG	POR	NC	0
