= Tommaso Gabrielli =

Italian motorcycle racer

- Nationality: Italian
- Born: 13 October 1992 (age 34); Bassano del Grappa, Italy
Motorcycle racing career statistics
125cc World Championship
Active years	2010
Manufacturers	Aprilia
Starts / Wins / Podiums / Poles / F. laps / Points; 5 / 0 / 0 / 0 / 0 / 0

Tommaso Gabrielli (born 13 October 1992) is an Italian motorcycle racer who has competed in the 125cc World Championship and the FIM Superstock 1000 Cup. His brother, Matteo Gabrielli, is also a motorcycle racer.

== Career statistics ==
- 2012 - 35th, FIM Superstock 1000 Cup, Aprilia RSV4

=== Grand Prix motorcycle racing ===
==== By season ====
Season	Class	Motorcycle	Team	Race	Win	Podium	Pole	FLap	Pts	Plcd
2010	125cc	Aprilia	Racing Team Gabrielli	5	0	0	0	0	0	NC
2010	125cc	Aprilia	Ongetta Team	5	0	0	0	0	0	NC
Total				**5**	**0**	**0**	**0**	**0**	**0**	

==== Races by year ====
(key)

Year	Class	Bike	1	2	3	4	5	6	7	8	9	10	11	12	13	14	15	16	17	Pos.	Pts
2010	125cc	Aprilia	QAT	SPA	FRA	ITA; Ret	GBR	NED	CAT	GER	CZE	INP	RSM; 22	ARA	JPN; Ret	MAL; 19	AUS; DNQ	POR; DNQ	VAL; Ret	NC	0

=== Superstock 1000 Cup ===
==== Races by year ====
(key) (Races in bold indicate pole position) (Races in italics indicate fastest lap)

Year	Bike	1	2	3	4	5	6	7	8	9	10	Pos	Pts
2012	Aprilia	IMO	NED	MNZ; Ret	SMR; 15	ARA	BRN	SIL	NŰR	ALG	MAG	35th	1
