= Hiromichi Kunikawa =

Japanese motorcycle racer

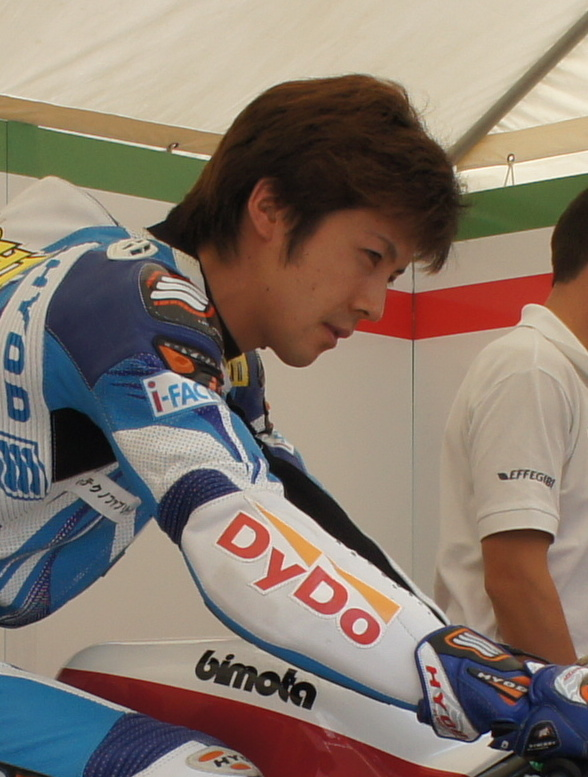
- Kunikawa at the 2010 Japanese Grand Prix
- Nationality: Japanese
- Born: 5 November 1981 (age 45); Chiba, Japan
Motorcycle racing career statistics
Moto2 World Championship
Active years	2010
Manufacturers	Bimota
Starts / Wins / Podiums / Poles / F. laps / Points; 4 / 0 / 0 / 0 / 0 / 0
Supersport World Championship
Active years	2016–2017
Manufacturers	Kawasaki, Honda
Starts / Wins / Podiums / Poles / F. laps / Points; 6 / 0 / 0 / 0 / 0 / 0

Hiromichi Kunikawa (國川 浩道, Kunikawa Hiromichi; born 5 November 1981) is a Japanese motorcycle racer. At national level, he has competed in the GP250 and ST600 classes of the MFJ All Japan Road Race Championship. In 2010, he was signed by Bimota M Racing to replace Niccolò Canepa for the last races of the Moto2 World Championship season. In 2016, he made a wild card appearance in the Supersport World Championship; in 2017, he competed in the first five European rounds of the same series aboard a Honda CBR600RR.

== Career statistics ==
=== Grand Prix motorcycle racing ===
==== By season ====
Season	Class	Motorcycle	Team	Race	Win	Podium	Pole	FLap	Pts	Plcd
2010	Moto2	Bimota	Bimota – M Racing	4	0	0	0	0	0	NC
Total				**4**	**0**	**0**	**0**	**0**	**0**	

==== Races by year ====
Year	Class	Bike	1	2	3	4	5	6	7	8	9	10	11	12	13	14	15	16	17	Pos.	Pts
2010	Moto2	Bimota	QAT	SPA	FRA	ITA	GBR	NED	CAT	GER	CZE	INP	RSM	ARA	JPN; Ret	MAL; 28	AUS; Ret	POR; DNQ	VAL; 33	NC	0

=== Supersport World Championship ===
==== Races by year ====
(key) (Races in bold indicate pole position; races in italics indicate fastest lap)

Year	Bike	1	2	3	4	5	6	7	8	9	10	11	12	Pos.	Pts
2016	Kawasaki	AUS	THA	SPA; Ret	NED	ITA	MAL	GBR	ITA	GER	FRA	SPA	QAT	NC	0
2017	Honda	AUS	THA	SPA; 23	NED; Ret	ITA; 20	GBR; 26	ITA; 21	GER	POR	FRA	SPA	QAT	NC	0
