= Joan Olivé =

Spanish motorcycle racer

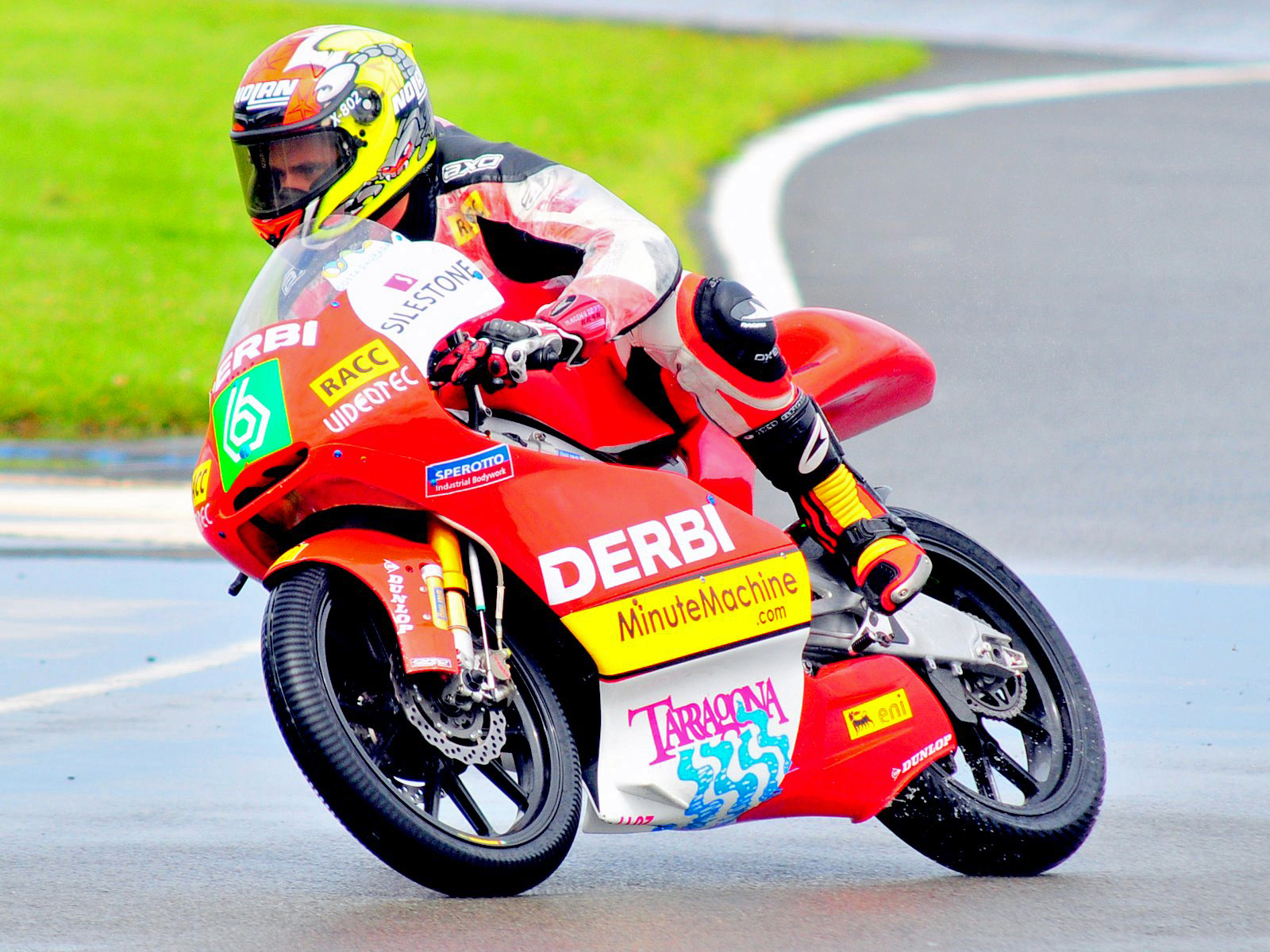
- Olivé at the 2009 British Grand Prix.
- Nationality: Spanish
- Born: 22 November 1984 (age 41); Tarragona, Spain
Motorcycle racing career statistics
Moto2 World Championship
Active years	2010–2011
Manufacturers	Promoharris-Honda, FTR-Honda
Championships	0
2011 championship position	NC (0 pts)
Starts / Wins / Podiums / Poles / F. laps / Points; 21 / 0 / 0 / 0 / 0 / 0
Moto3 World Championship
Active years	2012–
Manufacturers	KTM
Championships	0
2012 championship position	NC (0 pts)
Starts / Wins / Podiums / Poles / F. laps / Points; 2 / 0 / 0 / 0 / 0 / 0
250cc World Championship
Active years	2003–2004
Manufacturers	Aprilia
Championships	0
2004 championship position	19th (27 pts)
Starts / Wins / Podiums / Poles / F. laps / Points; 32 / 0 / 0 / 0 / 0 / 65
125cc World Championship
Active years	2001–2002, 2005–2009
Manufacturers	Honda, Aprilia, Derbi
Championships	0
2009 championship position	9th (91 pts)
Starts / Wins / Podiums / Poles / F. laps / Points; 114 / 0 / 9 / 0 / 3 / 619

Joan Olivé Márquez (born 22 November 1984 in Tarragona, Catalonia, Spain) is a former professional Grand Prix motorcycle road racer. He has competed in the 125cc, 250cc, Moto2 and Moto3 World championships since he started to race professionally in the 2001 Grand Prix motorcycle racing season. After retiring from racing, he became the test/replacement rider for KTM's Moto3 project. In early 2019, Olivé was appointed team manager of the Marc VDS Racing team.

== Grand Prix motorcycle racing career ==
Season	Class	Motorcycle	Team	Number	Races	Win	Podiums	Pole	Pts	Position
2001	125cc	Honda	Telefonica Movistar Jnr Team	25	16	0	0	0	34	19th
2002	125cc	Honda	Telefonica Movistar Jnr Team	25	16	0	1	0	76	12th
2003	250cc	Aprilia	Aspar Junior Team	11	16	0	0	0	38	12th
2004	250cc	Aprilia	Campetella Racing	11	16	0	0	0	27	19th
2005	125cc	Aprilia	Nocable.it Racing	6	16	0	1	0	60	14th
2006	125cc	Aprilia	SSM Racing	6	16	0	0	0	85	10th
2007	125cc	Aprilia	Polaris World	6	17	0	2	0	131	8th
2008	125cc	Derbi	Belson Derbi	6	17	0	4	0	142	7th
2009	125cc	Derbi	Derbi Racing Team	6	16	0	1	0	91	9th
2010	Moto2	Promoharris	Jack & Jones by A.Banderas	5	15	0	0	0	0	NC
2010	Moto2	FTR	Jack & Jones by A.Banderas	5	15	0	0	0	0	NC
2011	Moto2	FTR	Aeroport de Castello	6	6	0	0	0	0	NC
2012	Moto3	KTM	TT Motion Events Racing	6	2	0	0	0	0	NC
Total					**169**	**0**	**9**	**0**	**684**	

=== Races by year ===
(key) (Races in bold indicate pole position, races in italics indicate fastest lap)

Year	Class	Bike	1	2	3	4	5	6	7	8	9	10	11	12	13	14	15	16	17	Pos	Pts
2001	125cc	Honda	JPN; 19	RSA; 16	SPA; 14	FRA; Ret	ITA; 10	CAT; 8	NED; Ret	GBR; 14	GER; 15	CZE; 14	POR; Ret	VAL; 10	PAC; 12	AUS; 27	MAL; 12	BRA; 11		19th	34
2002	125cc	Honda	JPN; 13	RSA; Ret	SPA; 9	FRA; Ret	ITA; Ret	CAT; 6	NED; 3	GBR; 6	GER; 11	CZE; Ret	POR; Ret	BRA; 22	PAC; 8	MAL; 13	AUS; 9	VAL; 9		12th	76
2003	250cc	Aprilia	JPN; 13	RSA; Ret	SPA; 10	FRA; 10	ITA; 10	CAT; 10	NED; 23	GBR; Ret	GER; 17	CZE; 16	POR; Ret	BRA; 7	PAC; 19	MAL; 14	AUS; 18	VAL; Ret		12th	38
2004	250cc	Aprilia	RSA; 17	SPA; 20	FRA; 10	ITA; 11	CAT; Ret	NED; Ret	BRA; Ret	GER; 13	GBR; 11	CZE; 15	POR; 18	JPN; Ret	QAT; 10	MAL; 18	AUS; Ret	VAL; 15		19th	27
2005	125cc	Aprilia	SPA; 8	POR; 18	CHN; 14	FRA; Ret	ITA; 3	CAT; Ret	NED; 13	GBR; 8	GER; 8	CZE; 22	JPN; 18	MAL; 17	QAT; 11	AUS; 15	TUR; 9	VAL; 14		14th	60
2006	125cc	Aprilia	SPA; 9	QAT; Ret	TUR; 5	CHN; 14	FRA; 7	ITA; 13	CAT; 9	NED; 12	GBR; 6	GER; 9	CZE; 8	MAL; 5	AUS; 10	JPN; Ret	POR; Ret	VAL; 20		10th	85
2007	125cc	Aprilia	QAT; 11	SPA; 8	TUR; 2	CHN; 19	FRA; 5	ITA; Ret	CAT; 8	GBR; 5	NED; 10	GER; 11	CZE; 12	SMR; 12	POR; 5	JPN; 5	AUS; 2	MAL; 4	VAL; 30	8th	131
2008	125cc	Derbi	QAT; 2	SPA; Ret	POR; 2	CHN; 6	FRA; 8	ITA; 9	CAT; Ret	GBR; 7	NED; 2	GER; Ret	CZE; 3	RSM; 12	INP; 12	JPN; 4	AUS; 14	MAL; 7	VAL; Ret	7th	142
2009	125cc	Derbi	QAT; 18	JPN; 7	SPA; 11	FRA; Ret	ITA; Ret	CAT; 14	NED; 11	GER; 3	GBR; 12	CZE; 10	INP; 8	RSM; 8	POR; 5	AUS; Ret	MAL; 9	VAL; 6		9th	91
2010	Moto2	Promoharris	QAT; 32	SPA; Ret	FRA; 24	ITA; DNS	GBR; Ret	NED; 32	CAT; 21	GER; Ret	CZE; 31	INP; 22		ARA; 28	JPN; Ret	MAL; 23	AUS; 34	POR; DNQ	VAL; 28	NC	0
2010	Moto2	FTR											RSM; 21							NC	0
2011	Moto2	FTR	QAT	SPA	POR	FRA	CAT	GBR	NED	ITA	GER	CZE	INP	RSM; 26	ARA; 28	JPN; 26	AUS; 23	MAL; 16	VAL; 26	NC	0
2012	Moto3	KTM	QAT	SPA	POR; 16	FRA	CAT	GBR	NED	GER	ITA	INP	CZE; 18	RSM	ARA	JPN	MAL	AUS	VAL	NC	0

Sporting positions
Preceded by Jerónimo Vidal	Spanish 125cc Champion; 2000	Succeeded by Ángel Rodríguez
