= Tomoyoshi Koyama =

Japanese motorcycle racer

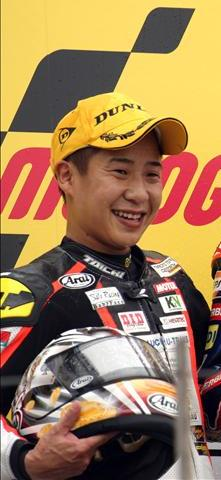
- Koyama at the 2010 German Grand Prix
- Nationality: Japanese
- Born: March 19, 1983 (age 43); Kanagawa, Japan
- Current team: Japan Post NTT docomo Business
- Bike number: 71
Motorcycle racing career statistics
Moto2 World Championship
| Active years | 2011–2012, 2014–2015 |
| Manufacturers | Suter, TSR, NTS |
| Championships | 0 |
| 2015 championship position | 26th (3 pts) |
Starts / Wins / Podiums / Poles / F. laps / Points; 13 / 0 / 0 / 0 / 0 / 3
250cc World Championship
| Active years | 2003 |
| Manufacturers | Yamaha |
| Championships | 0 |
| 2003 championship position | NC (0 pts) |
Starts / Wins / Podiums / Poles / F. laps / Points; 2 / 0 / 0 / 0 / 0 / 0
125cc World Championship
| Active years | 2000, 2004–2010 |
| Manufacturers | Yamaha, Honda, Malaguti, KTM, Loncin, Aprilia |
| Championships | 0 |
| 2010 championship position | 8th (127 pts) |
Starts / Wins / Podiums / Poles / F. laps / Points; 98 / 1 / 9 / 0 / 0 / 553

Tomoyoshi 'Tommy' Koyama (Japanese: 小山 知良, Hepburn: Koyama Tomoyoshi; born March 19, 1983) is a Japanese Grand Prix motorcycle racer who competes in the ST600 class of the All Japan Road Race Championship for Japan Post NTT docomo Business, aboard a Honda CBR600RR.

== Career ==
Koyama was born in Sagamihara, Kanagawa, Japan. After competing in Grand Prix races as a wild card since 2000 – having been the champion of the MFJ All Japan Road Race GP125 Championship in 2000, and finished in the top five for three successive seasons in the MFJ All Japan Road Race GP250 Championship – Koyama joined the series full-time in 2005, with Ajo Motorsport. His best result of the season was second at Phillip Island, and he also was best rookie of the season. 2006 wasn't as good for him, but after he moved to KTM in 2007, he scored his first victory at the 2007 Catalan motorcycle Grand Prix. 2008 was much less successful for both Koyama and KTM with a best place of sixth his only top-ten finish in the first ten races. He ended the 2008 season with seventh at Valencia and 17th in the final standings, four places behind the most successful KTM rider (Marc Márquez) in an unsuccessful year for the Austrian concern. For 2009, Koyama joined the smaller Loncin team, alongside Alexis Masbou, and struggled to score points. In 2010, Koyama rode an RS Aprilia for Racing Team Germany. Koyama finished eighth in the championship, taking a best placing of second at the German Grand Prix at the Sachsenring.

After failing to find a full-time Grand Prix ride for the 2011 season, Koyama competed in both the Spanish Moto2 championship (where he finished third), and in the MFJ All Japan Road Race J-GP2 Championship, finishing eighth. Koyama also competed in three Grand Prix Moto2 races towards the end of the season; he replaced the injured Kenan Sofuoğlu at Misano and Aragón, as well as a wild-card appearance at Motegi, but failed to score points in any of the appearances. Koyama remained in the Spanish Moto2 championship in 2012, where he finished ninth overall. After Roberto Rolfo parted company with Technomag-CIP at Grand Prix level, Koyama completed the season with the team; in six races, he finished outside the points in them all.

== Career statistics ==
=== Grand Prix motorcycle racing ===
==== By season ====
| Season | Class | Motorcycle | Team | Number | Race | Win | Podium | Pole | Pts | Plcd |
|---|---|---|---|---|---|---|---|---|---|---|
| 2000 | 125cc | Yamaha | SP Tadao Racing Team | 98 | 1 | 0 | 0 | 0 | 0 | NC |
| 2003 | 250cc | Yamaha | SP Tadao Racing Team | 67 | 2 | 0 | 0 | 0 | 0 | NC |
| 2004 | 125cc | Yamaha | SP Tadao Racing Team | 89 | 2 | 0 | 0 | 0 | 7 | 27th |
| 2005 | 125cc | Honda | Ajo Motorsport | 71 | 16 | 0 | 2 | 0 | 119 | 8th |
| 2006 | 125cc | Malaguti | Malaguti Ajo Corse | 71 | 13 | 0 | 0 | 0 | 49 | 15th |
| 2007 | 125cc | KTM | Red Bull KTM 125 | 71 | 17 | 1 | 6 | 0 | 193 | **3rd** |
| 2008 | 125cc | KTM | ISPA KTM Aran | 71 | 16 | 0 | 0 | 0 | 41 | 17th |
| 2009 | 125cc | Loncin | Loncin Racing | 71 | 16 | 0 | 0 | 0 | 17 | 24th |
| 2010 | 125cc | Aprilia | Racing Team Germany | 71 | 17 | 0 | 1 | 0 | 127 | 8th |
| 2011 | Moto2 | Suter | Technomag-CIP | 7 | 3 | 0 | 0 | 0 | 0 | NC |
| 2011 | Moto2 | TSR | CIP with TSR | 7 | 3 | 0 | 0 | 0 | 0 | NC |
| 2012 | Moto2 | Suter | Technomag-CIP | 75 | 6 | 0 | 0 | 0 | 0 | NC |
| 2014 | Moto2 | NTS | Teluru Team JiR Webike | 71 | 3 | 0 | 0 | 0 | 0 | NC |
| 2015 | Moto2 | NTS | NTS T.Pro Project | 71 | 1 | 0 | 0 | 0 | 3 | 26th |
| Total | | | | | **113** | **1** | **9** | **0** | **556** | |

==== Races by year ====
(key) (Races in bold indicate pole position; races in italics indicate fastest lap)

| Year | Class | Bike | 1 | 2 | 3 | 4 | 5 | 6 | 7 | 8 | 9 | 10 | 11 | 12 | 13 | 14 | 15 | 16 | 17 | 18 | Pos | Pts |
|---|---|---|---|---|---|---|---|---|---|---|---|---|---|---|---|---|---|---|---|---|---|---|
| 2000 | 125cc | Yamaha | RSA | MAL | JPN | SPA | FRA | ITA | CAT | NED | GBR | GER | CZE | POR | VAL | BRA | PAC; 16 | AUS | | | NC | 0 |
| 2003 | 250cc | Yamaha | JPN; Ret | RSA | SPA | FRA | ITA | CAT | NED | GBR | GER | CZE | POR | BRA | PAC; Ret | MAL | AUS | VAL | | | NC | 0 |
| 2004 | 125cc | Yamaha | RSA | SPA | FRA | ITA | CAT | NED | BRA | GER | GBR | CZE; 22 | POR | JPN; 9 | QAT | MAL | AUS | VAL | | | 27th | 7 |
| 2005 | 125cc | Honda | SPA; Ret | POR; 6 | CHN; 5 | FRA; Ret | ITA; 5 | CAT; 5 | NED; 7 | GBR; Ret | GER; Ret | CZE; Ret | JPN; 4 | MAL; 10 | QAT; 14 | AUS; 2 | TUR; 3 | VAL; 6 | | | 8th | 119 |
| 2006 | 125cc | Malaguti | SPA; 12 | QAT; 15 | TUR; 9 | CHN; 9 | FRA; 13 | ITA; 15 | CAT; DNS | NED | GBR | GER; 15 | CZE; 16 | MAL; Ret | AUS; 12 | JPN; 7 | POR; 6 | VAL; 14 | | | 15th | 49 |
| 2007 | 125cc | KTM | QAT; 6 | SPA; Ret | TUR; 3 | CHN; Ret | FRA; 10 | ITA; 5 | CAT; 1 | GBR; 2 | NED; 6 | GER; 2 | CZE; 5 | RSM; 3 | POR; 7 | JPN; 14 | AUS; 6 | MAL; 2 | VAL; 9 | | 3rd | 193 |
| 2008 | 125cc | KTM | QAT; Ret | SPA; 13 | POR; 16 | CHN; 13 | FRA; Ret | ITA; Ret | CAT; 13 | GBR; 6 | NED; 13 | GER; Ret | CZE; Ret | RSM; 18 | INP; 19 | JPN; 11 | AUS | MAL; 11 | VAL; 7 | | 17th | 41 |
| 2009 | 125cc | Loncin | QAT; 27 | JPN; 12 | SPA; Ret | FRA; Ret | ITA; Ret | CAT; 17 | NED; Ret | GER; 10 | GBR; 11 | CZE; 21 | INP; 14 | RSM; Ret | POR; Ret | AUS; 21 | MAL; Ret | VAL; 20 | | | 24th | 17 |
| 2010 | 125cc | Aprilia | QAT; 9 | SPA; 5 | FRA; 8 | ITA; 8 | GBR; 5 | NED; 14 | CAT; 6 | GER; 2 | CZE; 9 | INP; Ret | RSM; 8 | ARA; 6 | JPN; 6 | MAL; 22 | AUS; 9 | POR; Ret | VAL; 7 | | 8th | 127 |
| 2011 | Moto2 | Suter | QAT | SPA | POR | FRA | CAT | GBR | NED | ITA | GER | CZE | INP | RSM; 20 | ARA; 24 | | | | | | NC | 0 |
| 2011 | Moto2 | TSR | | | | | | | | | | | | | | JPN; 28 | AUS | MAL | VAL | | NC | 0 |
| 2012 | Moto2 | Suter | QAT | SPA | POR | FRA | CAT | GBR | NED | GER | ITA | INP | CZE | RSM; 20 | ARA; 23 | JPN; 22 | MAL; 16 | AUS; 21 | VAL; 18 | | NC | 0 |
| 2014 | Moto2 | NTS | QAT | AME | ARG | SPA | FRA | ITA | CAT | NED | GER | INP | CZE | GBR | RSM | ARA | JPN; 23 | AUS; 24 | MAL; 23 | VAL | NC | 0 |
| 2015 | Moto2 | NTS | QAT | AME | ARG | SPA | FRA | ITA | CAT | NED | GER | INP | CZE | GBR | RSM | ARA | JPN; 13 | AUS | MAL | VAL | 26th | 3 |

=== All Japan Road Race Championship ===
==== Races by year ====
(key) (Races in bold indicate pole position; races in italics indicate fastest lap)

| Year | Class | Bike | 1 | 2 | 3 | 4 | 5 | 6 | Pos | Pts |
|---|---|---|---|---|---|---|---|---|---|---|
| 2024 | ST600 | Honda | MOT; 5 | SUG1; Ret | SUG2; DNS | AUT; 7 | OKA; 5 | SUZ; DNS | 11th | 26.5 |
| 2025 | ST600 | Honda | SUG1; 11 | SUG2; 8 | MOT; 4 | AUT; 2 | **OKA**; 2 | SUZ; 2 | 4th | 76.3 |
| 2026 | ST600 | Honda | SUG1; 4 | SUG2; 3 | AUT; 1 | **MOT**; 2 | OKA; 13 | SUZ; 3 | 2nd | 96 |
