= 2010 Japanese motorcycle Grand Prix =

14th round of the 2010 FIM Road Racing World Championship season

(Japan) 2010 Japanese Grand Prix
Race details
- Race 14 of 18 races in the 2010 Grand Prix motorcycle racing season
- Date: 3 October 2010
- Official name: Grand Prix of Japan
- Location: Twin Ring Motegi
- Course: Permanent racing facility; 4.801 km (2.983 mi)

MotoGP
Pole position
- Rider: (Italy) Andrea Dovizioso
- Time: 1:47.001
Fastest lap
- Rider: (Italy) Valentino Rossi
- Time: 1:47.395
Podium
- First: (Australia) Casey Stoner
- Second: (Italy) Andrea Dovizioso
- Third: (Italy) Valentino Rossi

Moto2
Pole position
- Rider: (Spain) Julián Simón
- Time: 1:53.008
Fastest lap
- Rider: (Spain) Julián Simón
- Time: 1:53.653
Podium
- First: (Spain) Toni Elías
- Second: (Spain) Julián Simón
- Third: (Czech Republic) Karel Abraham

125cc
Pole position
- Rider: (Spain) Marc Márquez
- Time: 1:58.030
Fastest lap
- Rider: (Germany) Sandro Cortese
- Time: 1:58.666
Podium
- First: (Spain) Marc Márquez
- Second: (Spain) Nicolás Terol
- Third: (United Kingdom) Bradley Smith

The 2010 Japanese motorcycle Grand Prix was the fourteenth round of the 2010 Grand Prix motorcycle racing season. It took place on the weekend of 1–3 October 2010 at the Twin Ring Motegi, located in Motegi, Japan. It was originally planned to take place on the weekend of April 23–25, but due to disrupted air travel caused by the 2010 eruption of Eyjafjallajökull it was postponed as it was difficult for team personnel and equipment to get there.

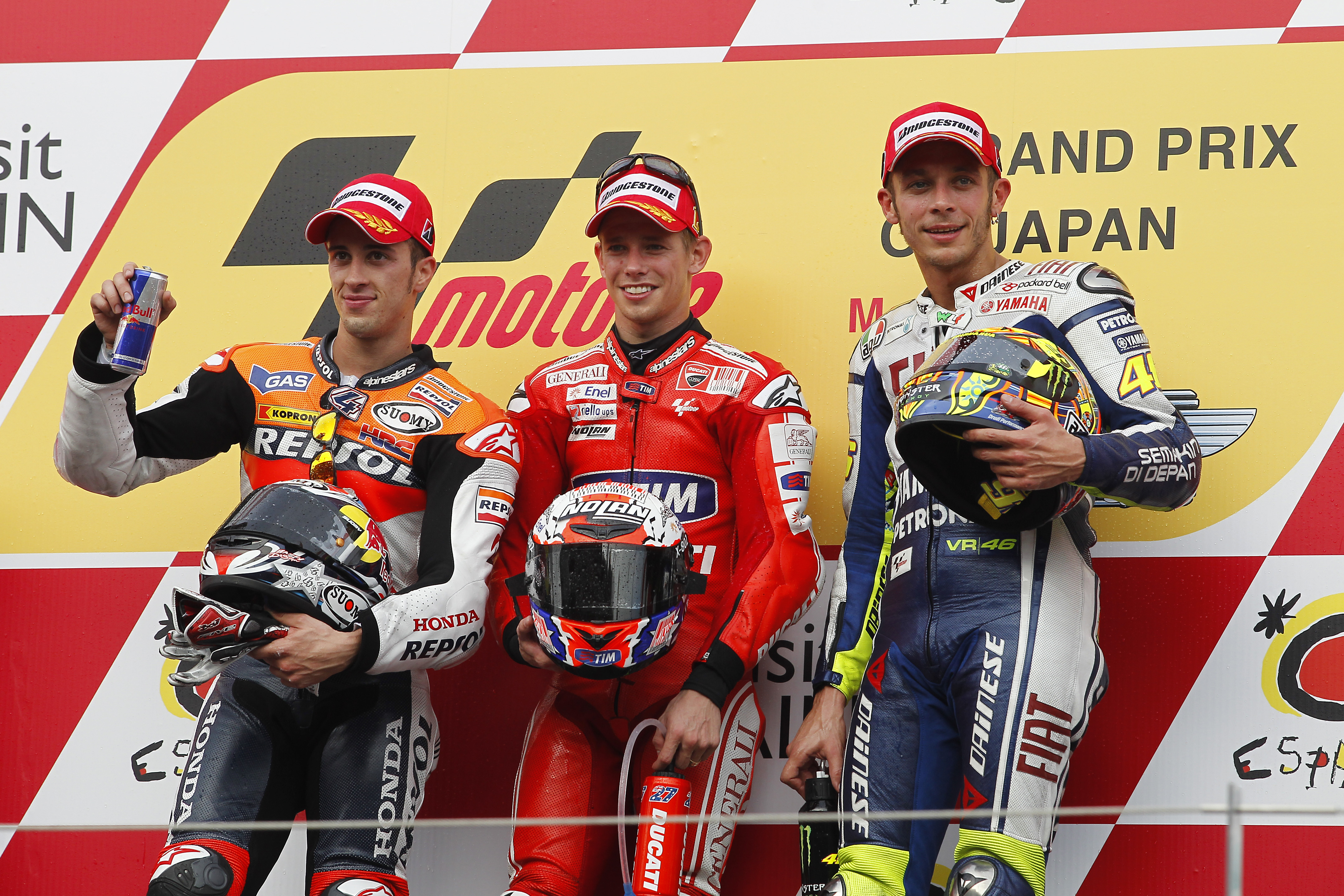
Andrea Dovizioso, Casey Stoner and Valentino Rossi, celebrating on the podium after finishing second, first and third at the MotoGP race.

== MotoGP classification ==
Pos.	No.	Rider	Team	Manufacturer	Laps	Time/Retired	Grid	Points
1	27	(Australia) Casey Stoner	Ducati Team	Ducati	24	43:12.266	3	25
2	4	(Italy) Andrea Dovizioso	Repsol Honda Team	Honda	24	+3.868	1	20
3	46	(Italy) Valentino Rossi	Fiat Yamaha Team	Yamaha	24	+5.707	2	16
4	99	(Spain) Jorge Lorenzo	Fiat Yamaha Team	Yamaha	24	+6.221	4	13
5	5	(United States) Colin Edwards	Monster Yamaha Tech 3	Yamaha	24	+27.092	5	11
6	58	(Italy) Marco Simoncelli	San Carlo Honda Gresini	Honda	24	+30.021	8	10
7	19	(Spain) Álvaro Bautista	Rizla Suzuki MotoGP	Suzuki	24	+31.826	9	9
8	11	(United States) Ben Spies	Monster Yamaha Tech 3	Yamaha	24	+35.572	6	8
9	14	(France) Randy de Puniet	LCR Honda MotoGP	Honda	24	+47.564	7	7
10	7	(Japan) Hiroshi Aoyama	Interwetten Honda MotoGP	Honda	24	+49.598	14	6
11	33	(Italy) Marco Melandri	San Carlo Honda Gresini	Honda	24	+49.999	12	5
12	69	(United States) Nicky Hayden	Ducati Team	Ducati	24	+50.703	11	4
13	40	(Spain) Héctor Barberá	Páginas Amarillas Aspar	Ducati	24	+51.422	15	3
14	41	(Spain) Aleix Espargaró	Pramac Racing Team	Ducati	24	+52.843	13	2
15	36	(Finland) Mika Kallio	Pramac Racing Team	Ducati	24	+1:14.668	16	1
Ret	65	(Italy) Loris Capirossi	Rizla Suzuki MotoGP	Suzuki	21	Retirement	10	
WD	26	(Spain) Dani Pedrosa	Repsol Honda Team	Honda		Injured		

== Moto2 classification ==
Pos.	No.	Rider	Manufacturer	Laps	Time/Retired	Grid	Points
1	24	(Spain) Toni Elías	Moriwaki	23	43:50.930	4	25
2	60	(Spain) Julián Simón	Suter	23	+0.315	1	20
3	17	(Czech Republic) Karel Abraham	FTR	23	+9.839	7	16
4	15	(San Marino) Alex de Angelis	Motobi	23	+10.178	6	13
5	45	(United Kingdom) Scott Redding	Suter	23	+11.237	2	11
6	72	(Japan) Yuki Takahashi	Tech 3	23	+12.778	3	10
7	65	(Germany) Stefan Bradl	Suter	23	+17.284	8	9
8	12	(Switzerland) Thomas Lüthi	Moriwaki	23	+17.892	16	8
9	44	(Italy) Roberto Rolfo	Suter	23	+19.235	11	7
10	6	(Spain) Alex Debón	FTR	23	+19.568	26	6
11	3	(Italy) Simone Corsi	Motobi	23	+22.713	18	5
12	77	(Switzerland) Dominique Aegerter	Suter	23	+23.417	12	4
13	29	(Italy) Andrea Iannone	Speed Up	23	+25.847	10	3
14	71	(Italy) Claudio Corti	Suter	23	+27.528	5	2
15	35	(Italy) Raffaele De Rosa	Tech 3	23	+28.696	17	1
16	16	(France) Jules Cluzel	Suter	23	+29.629	13	
17	40	(Spain) Sergio Gadea	Pons Kalex	23	+34.072	20	
18	63	(France) Mike Di Meglio	Suter	23	+37.087	19	
19	80	(Spain) Axel Pons	Pons Kalex	23	+40.460	28	
20	56	(Austria) Michael Ranseder	Suter	23	+40.653	23	
21	2	(Hungary) Gábor Talmácsi	Speed Up	23	+40.855	27	
22	9	(United States) Kenny Noyes	Promoharris	23	+42.287	21	
23	8	(Australia) Anthony West	MZ-RE Honda	23	+44.814	30	
24	14	(Thailand) Ratthapark Wilairot	Bimota	23	+46.745	22	
25	28	(Japan) Kazuki Watanabe	Suter	23	+49.749	29	
26	53	(France) Valentin Debise	ADV	23	+49.964	31	
27	4	(Spain) Ricky Cardús	Bimota	23	+1:14.349	33	
28	95	(Qatar) Mashel Al Naimi	BQR-Moto2	23	+1:15.823	35	
29	88	(Spain) Yannick Guerra	Moriwaki	23	+1:16.189	37	
30	55	(Spain) Héctor Faubel	Suter	23	+1:21.900	24	
31	39	(Venezuela) Robertino Pietri	Suter	23	+1:26.024	34	
32	61	(Ukraine) Vladimir Ivanov	Moriwaki	23	+1:27.673	38	
33	70	(Italy) Ferruccio Lamborghini	Moriwaki	23	+1:41.644	32	
34	93	(Japan) Kouki Takahashi	RBB	23	+1:45.570	40	
Ret	5	(Spain) Joan Olivé	Promoharris	21	Accident	36	
Ret	25	(Italy) Alex Baldolini	I.C.P.	21	Accident	15	
Ret	68	(Colombia) Yonny Hernández	BQR-Moto2	20	Accident	9	
Ret	66	(Japan) Hiromichi Kunikawa	Bimota	11	Accident	39	
Ret	10	(Spain) Fonsi Nieto	Moriwaki	3	Accident	14	
Ret	11	(Japan) Yusuke Teshima	TSR	0	Accident	25	
DNS	83	(Japan) Shogo Moriwaki	Moriwaki		Did not start		
OFFICIAL MOTO2 REPORT

== 125 cc classification ==
Pos.	No.	Rider	Manufacturer	Laps	Time/Retired	Grid	Points
1	93	(Spain) Marc Márquez	Derbi	20	39:46.937	1	25
2	40	(Spain) Nicolás Terol	Aprilia	20	+2.612	2	20
3	38	(United Kingdom) Bradley Smith	Aprilia	20	+8.396	3	16
4	44	(Spain) Pol Espargaró	Derbi	20	+18.873	7	13
5	23	(Spain) Alberto Moncayo	Aprilia	20	+31.973	9	11
6	12	(Spain) Esteve Rabat	Aprilia	20	+32.139	6	10
7	99	(United Kingdom) Danny Webb	Aprilia	20	+46.716	13	9
8	39	(Spain) Luis Salom	Aprilia	20	+49.444	14	8
9	26	(Spain) Adrián Martín	Aprilia	20	+49.867	15	7
10	14	(France) Johann Zarco	Aprilia	20	+55.912	18	6
11	35	(Switzerland) Randy Krummenacher	Aprilia	20	+56.684	12	5
12	11	(Germany) Sandro Cortese	Derbi	20	+56.738	4	4
13	15	(Italy) Simone Grotzkyj	Aprilia	20	+1:05.988	8	3
14	78	(Germany) Marcel Schrötter	Honda	20	+1:10.339	20	2
15	53	(Netherlands) Jasper Iwema	Aprilia	20	+1:10.518	21	1
16	88	(Japan) Hikari Okubo	Honda	20	+1:21.138	25	
17	43	(Japan) Takehiro Yamamoto	Honda	20	+1:21.153	17	
18	69	(France) Louis Rossi	Aprilia	20	+1:21.403	22	
19	63	(Malaysia) Zulfahmi Khairuddin	Aprilia	20	+1:25.015	26	
20	42	(Japan) Syunya Mori	Honda	20	+1:25.186	27	
21	91	(Japan) Sasuke Shinozaki	Yamaha	20	+1:26.406	24	
22	71	(Japan) Tomoyoshi Koyama	Aprilia	20	+1:40.734	5	
23	87	(Italy) Luca Marconi	Aprilia	19	+1 lap	30	
24	89	(Japan) Yuma Yahagi	Honda	19	+1 lap	29	
Ret	52	(United Kingdom) Danny Kent	Lambretta	11	Accident	16	
Ret	32	(Italy) Lorenzo Savadori	Aprilia	8	Retirement	28	
Ret	84	(Czech Republic) Jakub Kornfeil	Aprilia	3	Retirement	19	
Ret	96	(Italy) Tommaso Gabrielli	Aprilia	1	Retirement	31	
Ret	50	(Norway) Sturla Fagerhaug	Aprilia	0	Accident	23	
Ret	7	(Spain) Efrén Vázquez	Derbi	0	Collision	10	
Ret	94	(Germany) Jonas Folger	Aprilia	0	Collision	11	
DNS	72	(Italy) Marco Ravaioli	Lambretta		Did not start		
OFFICIAL 125CC REPORT

== Championship standings after the race (MotoGP) ==
Below are the standings for the top five riders and constructors after round fourteen has concluded.

Riders' Championship standings

Pos.	Rider	Points
1	(Spain) Jorge Lorenzo	297
2	(Spain) Dani Pedrosa	228
3	(Australia) Casey Stoner	180
4	(Italy) Andrea Dovizioso	159
5	(Italy) Valentino Rossi	156

Constructors' Championship standings

Pos.	Constructor	Points
1	(Japan) Yamaha	309
2	(Japan) Honda	285
3	(Italy) Ducati	220
4	(Japan) Suzuki	81

- Note: Only the top five positions are included for both sets of standings.

Previous race: 2010 Aragon Grand Prix	FIM Grand Prix World Championship; 2010 season	Next race: 2010 Malaysian Grand Prix
Previous race: 2009 Japanese Grand Prix	Japanese motorcycle Grand Prix	Next race: 2011 Japanese Grand Prix
