= 2010 Australian motorcycle Grand Prix =

16th round of the 2010 FIM Road Racing World Championship season

(Australia) 2010 Australian Grand Prix
Race details
- Race 16 of 18 races in the 2010 Grand Prix motorcycle racing season
- Date: 17 October 2010
- Official name: Iveco Australian Motorcycle Grand Prix
- Location: Phillip Island Grand Prix Circuit
- Course: Permanent racing facility; 4.448 km (2.764 mi)

MotoGP
Pole position
- Rider: (Australia) Casey Stoner
- Time: 1:30.107
Fastest lap
- Rider: (Australia) Casey Stoner
- Time: 1:30.458
Podium
- First: (Australia) Casey Stoner
- Second: (Spain) Jorge Lorenzo
- Third: (Italy) Valentino Rossi

Moto2
Pole position
- Rider: (San Marino) Alex de Angelis
- Time: 1:35.148
Fastest lap
- Rider: (Italy) Andrea Iannone
- Time: 1:34.771
Podium
- First: (San Marino) Alex de Angelis
- Second: (United Kingdom) Scott Redding
- Third: (Italy) Andrea Iannone

125cc
Pole position
- Rider: (Spain) Marc Márquez
- Time: 1:38.236
Fastest lap
- Rider: (Spain) Marc Márquez
- Time: 1:38.305
Podium
- First: (Spain) Marc Márquez
- Second: (Spain) Pol Espargaró
- Third: (Spain) Nicolás Terol

The 2010 Australian motorcycle Grand Prix was the sixteenth round of the 2010 Grand Prix motorcycle racing season. It took place on the weekend of 15–17 October 2010 at the Phillip Island Grand Prix Circuit. Australian Casey Stoner won his fourth consecutive home race, which was also his last win for Ducati and Ducati's last win until the 2016 Austrian motorcycle Grand Prix.

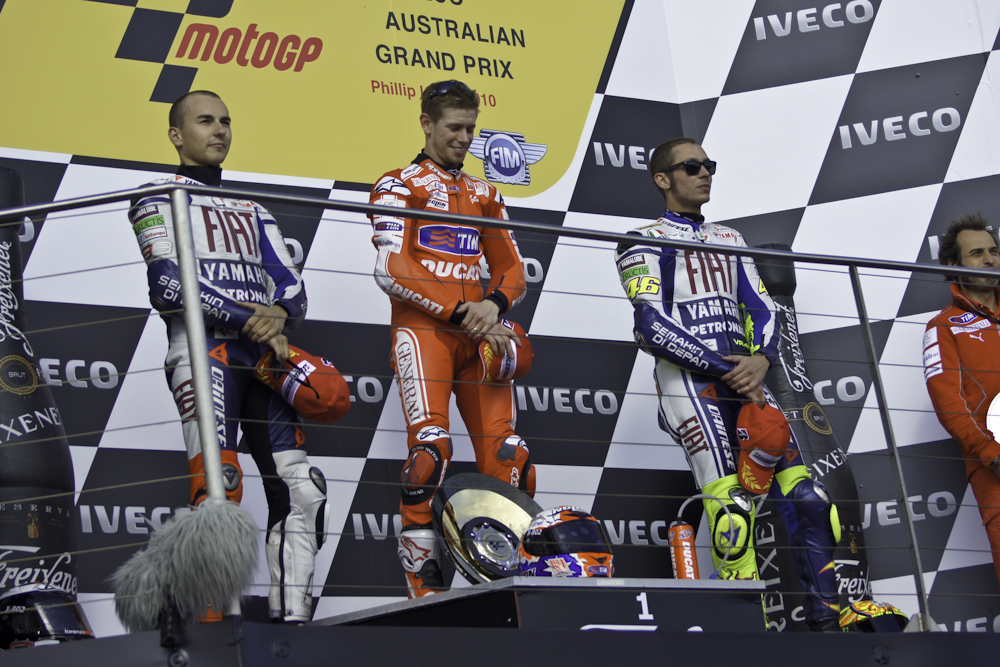
Jorge Lorenzo, Casey Stoner and Valentino Rossi on the podium after finishing second, first and third in the MotoGP race

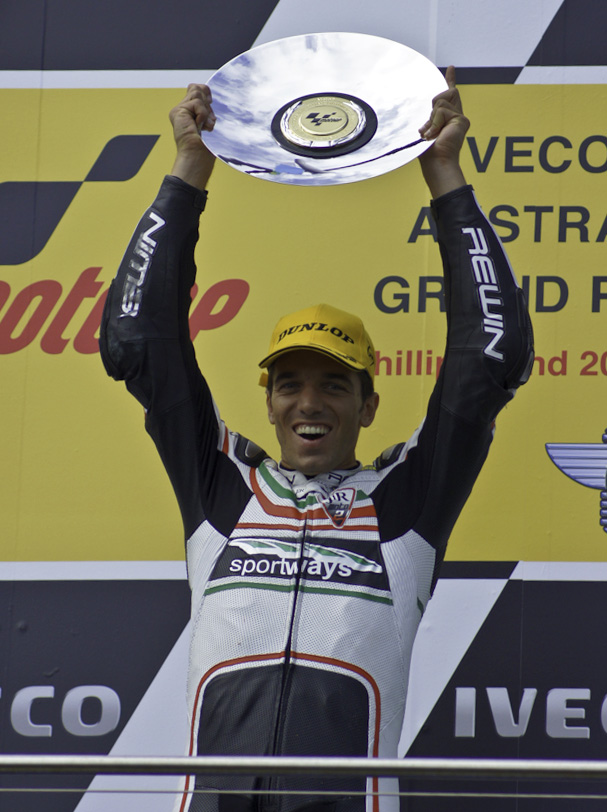
Alex de Angelis, celebrating on the podium after winning the Moto2 race

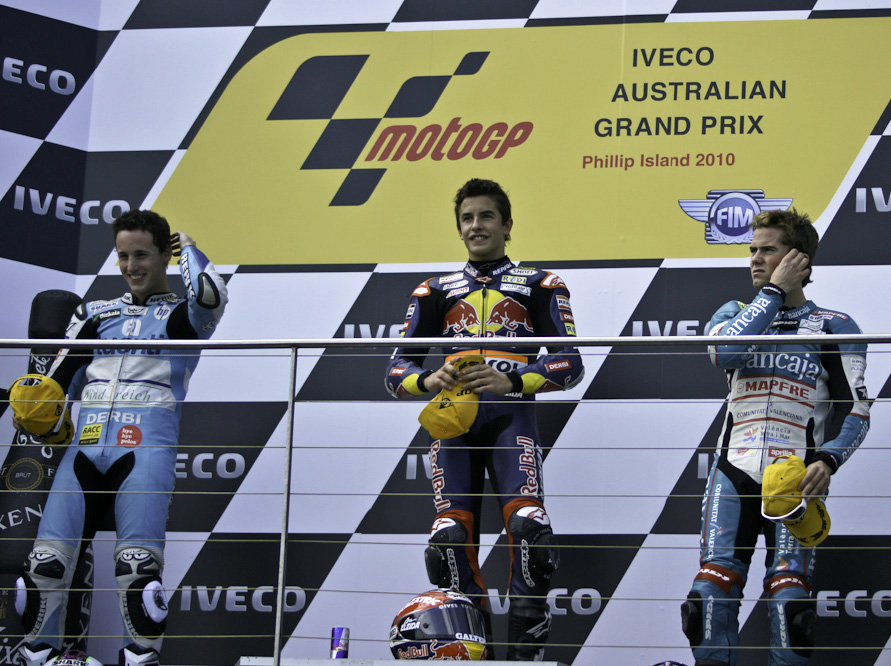
Pol Espargaró, Marc Márquez and Nicolás Terol, celebrating on the podium after finishing second, first and third at the 125cc race

== MotoGP classification ==
Pos.	No.	Rider	Team	Manufacturer	Laps	Time/Retired	Grid	Points
1	27	(Australia) Casey Stoner	Ducati Team	Ducati	27	41:09.128	1	25
2	99	(Spain) Jorge Lorenzo	Fiat Yamaha Team	Yamaha	27	+8.598	2	20
3	46	(Italy) Valentino Rossi	Fiat Yamaha Team	Yamaha	27	+17.997	8	16
4	69	(United States) Nicky Hayden	Ducati Team	Ducati	27	+18.035	6	13
5	11	(United States) Ben Spies	Monster Yamaha Tech 3	Yamaha	27	+22.211	3	11
6	58	(Italy) Marco Simoncelli	San Carlo Honda Gresini	Honda	27	+25.017	4	10
7	5	(United States) Colin Edwards	Monster Yamaha Tech 3	Yamaha	27	+35.168	5	9
8	41	(Spain) Aleix Espargaró	Pramac Racing Team	Ducati	27	+46.194	11	8
9	33	(Italy) Marco Melandri	San Carlo Honda Gresini	Honda	27	+46.294	10	7
10	14	(France) Randy de Puniet	LCR Honda MotoGP	Honda	27	+59.635	7	6
11	36	(Finland) Mika Kallio	Pramac Racing Team	Ducati	27	+59.664	12	5
12	19	(Spain) Álvaro Bautista	Rizla Suzuki MotoGP	Suzuki	27	+59.732	14	4
13	7	(Japan) Hiroshi Aoyama	Interwetten Honda MotoGP	Honda	27	+1:05.029	13	3
14	40	(Spain) Héctor Barberá	Páginas Amarillas Aspar	Ducati	27	+1:05.053	15	2
Ret	4	(Italy) Andrea Dovizioso	Repsol Honda Team	Honda	3	Accident	9	
DNS	26	(Spain) Dani Pedrosa	Repsol Honda Team	Honda		Did not start		
DNS	65	(Italy) Loris Capirossi	Rizla Suzuki MotoGP	Suzuki		Did not start		

== Moto2 classification ==
Wayne Maxwell was black flagged for dangerous riding, crashing into Héctor Faubel during the first lap with a physical altercation following.

Pos.	No.	Rider	Manufacturer	Laps	Time/Retired	Grid	Points
1	15	(San Marino) Alex de Angelis	Motobi	25	39:51.102	1	25
2	45	(United Kingdom) Scott Redding	Suter	25	+2.172	2	20
3	29	(Italy) Andrea Iannone	Speed Up	25	+2.974	5	16
4	60	(Spain) Julián Simón	Suter	25	+10.344	6	13
5	65	(Germany) Stefan Bradl	Suter	25	+10.617	3	11
6	63	(France) Mike Di Meglio	Suter	25	+17.847	4	10
7	24	(Spain) Toni Elías	Moriwaki	25	+27.145	9	9
8	3	(Italy) Simone Corsi	Motobi	25	+27.249	14	8
9	6	(Spain) Alex Debón	FTR	25	+27.398	21	7
10	17	(Czech Republic) Karel Abraham	FTR	25	+27.666	10	6
11	12	(Switzerland) Thomas Lüthi	Moriwaki	25	+27.677	12	5
12	10	(Spain) Fonsi Nieto	Moriwaki	25	+27.851	15	4
13	77	(Switzerland) Dominique Aegerter	Suter	25	+28.333	26	3
14	80	(Spain) Axel Pons	Pons Kalex	25	+28.438	18	2
15	71	(Italy) Claudio Corti	Suter	25	+28.497	16	1
16	35	(Italy) Raffaele De Rosa	Tech 3	25	+32.644	8	
17	72	(Japan) Yuki Takahashi	Tech 3	25	+37.671	19	
18	2	(Hungary) Gábor Talmácsi	Speed Up	25	+42.933	22	
19	68	(Colombia) Yonny Hernández	BQR-Moto2	25	+46.144	24	
20	25	(Italy) Alex Baldolini	I.C.P.	25	+46.164	20	
21	8	(Australia) Anthony West	MZ-RE Honda	25	+46.370	23	
22	14	(Thailand) Ratthapark Wilairot	Bimota	25	+51.841	27	
23	16	(France) Jules Cluzel	Suter	25	+54.114	17	
24	40	(Spain) Sergio Gadea	Pons Kalex	25	+1:00.729	28	
25	46	(Spain) Javier Forés	Bimota	25	+1:04.140	29	
26	44	(Italy) Roberto Rolfo	Suter	25	+1:04.185	25	
27	39	(Venezuela) Robertino Pietri	Suter	25	+1:09.299	32	
28	53	(France) Valentin Debise	ADV	25	+1:09.794	30	
29	61	(Ukraine) Vladimir Ivanov	Moriwaki	25	+1:16.060	31	
30	49	(Australia) Alex Cudlin	BQR-Moto2	25	+1:16.195	33	
31	9	(United States) Kenny Noyes	Promoharris	25	+1:34.156	35	
32	28	(Japan) Kazuki Watanabe	Suter	24	+1 lap	34	
33	88	(Spain) Yannick Guerra	Moriwaki	24	+1 lap	37	
34	5	(Spain) Joan Olivé	Promoharris	24	+1 lap	36	
Ret	95	(Qatar) Mashel Al Naimi	BQR-Moto2	20	Retirement	38	
Ret	56	(Austria) Michael Ranseder	Suter	18	Retirement	7	
Ret	66	(Japan) Hiromichi Kunikawa	Bimota	10	Retirement	39	
Ret	55	(Spain) Héctor Faubel	Suter	0	Collision	13	
DSQ	47	(Australia) Wayne Maxwell	Moriwaki	3	Disqualified	11	
OFFICIAL MOTO2 REPORT

== 125 cc classification ==
Pos.	No.	Rider	Manufacturer	Laps	Time/Retired	Grid	Points
1	93	(Spain) Marc Márquez	Derbi	23	38:13.008	1	25
2	44	(Spain) Pol Espargaró	Derbi	23	+6.062	3	20
3	40	(Spain) Nicolás Terol	Aprilia	23	+11.576	4	16
4	7	(Spain) Efrén Vázquez	Derbi	23	+19.032	7	13
5	38	(United Kingdom) Bradley Smith	Aprilia	23	+19.033	5	11
6	12	(Spain) Esteve Rabat	Aprilia	23	+20.593	6	10
7	71	(Japan) Tomoyoshi Koyama	Aprilia	23	+31.519	8	9
8	39	(Spain) Luis Salom	Aprilia	23	+46.598	9	8
9	35	(Switzerland) Randy Krummenacher	Aprilia	23	+48.730	12	7
10	99	(United Kingdom) Danny Webb	Aprilia	23	+58.456	11	6
11	26	(Spain) Adrián Martín	Aprilia	23	+1:15.857	17	5
12	50	(Norway) Sturla Fagerhaug	Aprilia	23	+1:19.506	19	4
13	78	(Germany) Marcel Schrötter	Honda	23	+1:19.540	15	3
14	84	(Czech Republic) Jakub Kornfeil	Aprilia	23	+1:19.543	18	2
15	15	(Italy) Simone Grotzkyj	Aprilia	23	+1:32.122	13	1
16	53	(Netherlands) Jasper Iwema	Aprilia	23	+1:42.366	21	
17	69	(France) Louis Rossi	Aprilia	22	+1 lap	24	
18	46	(Australia) Joshua Hook	Aprilia	22	+1 lap	22	
19	87	(Italy) Luca Marconi	Aprilia	22	+1 lap	20	
20	57	(Australia) Joel Taylor	Aprilia	22	+1 lap	25	
21	52	(United Kingdom) Danny Kent	Lambretta	22	+1 lap	23	
Ret	32	(Italy) Lorenzo Savadori	Aprilia	3	Retirement	16	
Ret	11	(Germany) Sandro Cortese	Derbi	2	Accident	2	
Ret	14	(France) Johann Zarco	Aprilia	0	Retirement	14	
Ret	23	(Spain) Alberto Moncayo	Aprilia	0	Accident	10	
DNQ	63	(Malaysia) Zulfahmi Khairuddin	Aprilia		Did not qualify		
DNQ	47	(Australia) Levi Day	Honda		Did not qualify		
DNQ	72	(Italy) Marco Ravaioli	Lambretta		Did not qualify		
DNQ	45	(Australia) Jordan Zamora	Honda		Did not qualify		
DNQ	54	(Australia) Nicky Diles	Aprilia		Did not qualify		
DNQ	96	(Italy) Tommaso Gabrielli	Aprilia		Did not qualify		
OFFICIAL 125CC REPORT

== Championship standings after the race (MotoGP) ==
Below are the standings for the top five riders and constructors after round sixteen has concluded.

Riders' Championship standings

Pos.	Rider	Points
1	(Spain) Jorge Lorenzo	333
2	(Spain) Dani Pedrosa	228
3	(Australia) Casey Stoner	205
4	(Italy) Valentino Rossi	197
5	(Italy) Andrea Dovizioso	179

Constructors' Championship standings

Pos.	Constructor	Points
1	(Japan) Yamaha	354
2	(Japan) Honda	315
3	(Italy) Ducati	255
4	(Japan) Suzuki	96

- Note: Only the top five positions are included for both sets of standings.

Previous race: 2010 Malaysian Grand Prix	FIM Grand Prix World Championship; 2010 season	Next race: 2010 Portuguese Grand Prix
Previous race: 2009 Australian Grand Prix	Australian motorcycle Grand Prix	Next race: 2011 Australian Grand Prix
