= 2010 Portuguese motorcycle Grand Prix =

17th round of the 2010 FIM Road Racing World Championship season

(Portugal) 2010 Portuguese Grand Prix
Race details
- Race 17 of 18 races in the 2010 Grand Prix motorcycle racing season
- Date: 31 October 2010
- Official name: bwin Grande Prémio de Portugal
- Location: Autódromo do Estoril
- Course: Permanent racing facility; 4.182 km (2.599 mi)

MotoGP
Pole position
- Rider: (Spain) Jorge Lorenzo
- Time: 1:48.522
Fastest lap
- Rider: (Spain) Jorge Lorenzo
- Time: 1:37.928
Podium
- First: (Spain) Jorge Lorenzo
- Second: (Italy) Valentino Rossi
- Third: (Italy) Andrea Dovizioso

Moto2
Pole position
- Rider: (Hungary) Gábor Talmácsi
- Time: 1:50.916
Fastest lap
- Rider: (United Kingdom) Scott Redding
- Time: 1:45.456
Podium
- First: (Germany) Stefan Bradl
- Second: (Italy) Alex Baldolini
- Third: (San Marino) Alex de Angelis

125cc
Pole position
- Rider: (United Kingdom) Bradley Smith
- Time: 2:00.148
Fastest lap
- Rider: (Spain) Marc Márquez
- Time: 1:48.088
Podium
- First: (Spain) Marc Márquez
- Second: (Spain) Nicolás Terol
- Third: (United Kingdom) Bradley Smith

The 2010 Portuguese motorcycle Grand Prix was the penultimate round of the 2010 Grand Prix motorcycle racing season. It took place in the weekend of 29–31 October 2010 at the Autódromo do Estoril located in Estoril, Portugal.

== MotoGP classification ==
Pos.	No.	Rider	Team	Manufacturer	Laps	Time/Retired	Grid	Points
1	99	(Spain) Jorge Lorenzo	Fiat Yamaha Team	Yamaha	28	46:17.962	1	25
2	46	(Italy) Valentino Rossi	Fiat Yamaha Team	Yamaha	28	+8.629	3	20
3	4	(Italy) Andrea Dovizioso	Repsol Honda Team	Honda	28	+26.475	7	16
4	58	(Italy) Marco Simoncelli	San Carlo Honda Gresini	Honda	28	+26.534	10	13
5	69	(United States) Nicky Hayden	Ducati Team	Ducati	28	+27.154	2	11
6	14	(France) Randy de Puniet	LCR Honda MotoGP	Honda	28	+28.297	8	10
7	5	(United States) Colin Edwards	Monster Yamaha Tech 3	Yamaha	28	+30.109	9	9
8	26	(Spain) Dani Pedrosa	Repsol Honda Team	Honda	28	+44.947	12	8
9	33	(Italy) Marco Melandri	San Carlo Honda Gresini	Honda	28	+1:13.649	6	7
10	40	(Spain) Héctor Barberá	Páginas Amarillas Aspar	Ducati	28	+1:17.721	15	6
11	19	(Spain) Álvaro Bautista	Rizla Suzuki MotoGP	Suzuki	28	+1:17.908	14	5
12	7	(Japan) Hiroshi Aoyama	Interwetten Honda MotoGP	Honda	28	+1:33.025	16	4
13	65	(Italy) Loris Capirossi	Rizla Suzuki MotoGP	Suzuki	28	+1:39.752	13	3
Ret	71	(Spain) Carlos Checa	Pramac Racing Team	Ducati	13	Retirement	17	
Ret	27	(Australia) Casey Stoner	Ducati Team	Ducati	4	Accident	4	
Ret	41	(Spain) Aleix Espargaró	Pramac Racing Team	Ducati	0	Accident	11	
DNS	11	(United States) Ben Spies	Monster Yamaha Tech 3	Yamaha	0	Injury	5	

== Moto2 classification ==
Pos.	No.	Rider	Manufacturer	Laps	Time/Retired	Grid	Points
1	65	(Germany) Stefan Bradl	Suter	26	46:59.723	10	25
2	25	(Italy) Alex Baldolini	I.C.P.	26	+0.068	11	20
3	15	(San Marino) Alex de Angelis	Motobi	26	+2.830	6	16
4	45	(United Kingdom) Scott Redding	Suter	26	+2.842	24	13
5	54	(Turkey) Kenan Sofuoğlu	Suter	26	+2.947	4	11
6	35	(Italy) Raffaele De Rosa	Tech 3	26	+3.311	5	10
7	8	(Australia) Anthony West	MZ-RE Honda	26	+3.385	20	9
8	2	(Hungary) Gábor Talmácsi	Speed Up	26	+3.952	1	8
9	77	(Switzerland) Dominique Aegerter	Suter	26	+4.284	8	7
10	17	(Czech Republic) Karel Abraham	FTR	26	+4.311	22	6
11	55	(Spain) Héctor Faubel	Suter	26	+4.492	23	5
12	60	(Spain) Julián Simón	Suter	26	+13.006	2	4
13	80	(Spain) Axel Pons	Pons Kalex	26	+26.529	19	3
14	3	(Italy) Simone Corsi	Motobi	26	+27.760	18	2
15	39	(Venezuela) Robertino Pietri	Suter	26	+28.259	13	1
16	12	(Switzerland) Thomas Lüthi	Moriwaki	26	+28.311	12	
17	16	(France) Jules Cluzel	Suter	26	+28.333	26	
18	68	(Colombia) Yonny Hernández	BQR-Moto2	26	+37.873	7	
19	71	(Italy) Claudio Corti	Suter	26	+38.092	17	
20	31	(Spain) Carmelo Morales	Suter	26	+38.227	16	
21	29	(Italy) Andrea Iannone	Speed Up	26	+46.976	33	
22	40	(Spain) Sergio Gadea	Pons Kalex	26	+1:01.779	32	
23	19	(Belgium) Xavier Siméon	Moriwaki	26	+1:25.872	34	
24	10	(Spain) Fonsi Nieto	Moriwaki	26	+1:26.029	28	
25	61	(Ukraine) Vladimir Ivanov	Moriwaki	26	+1:51.690	35	
26	72	(Japan) Yuki Takahashi	Tech 3	25	+1 lap	9	
27	70	(Italy) Ferruccio Lamborghini	Moriwaki	25	+1 lap	30	
28	88	(Spain) Yannick Guerra	Moriwaki	25	+1 lap	36	
29	95	(Qatar) Mashel Al Naimi	BQR-Moto2	25	+1 lap	37	
Ret	4	(Spain) Ricard Cardús	Bimota	23	Accident	14	
Ret	44	(Italy) Roberto Rolfo	Suter	22	Retirement	29	
Ret	7	(Spain) Dani Rivas	BQR-Moto2	19	Accident	27	
Ret	24	(Spain) Toni Elías	Moriwaki	17	Retirement	3	
Ret	14	(Thailand) Ratthapark Wilairot	Bimota	14	Retirement	31	
Ret	53	(France) Valentin Debise	ADV	13	Retirement	15	
Ret	9	(United States) Kenny Noyes	Promoharris	13	Retirement	21	
Ret	56	(Austria) Michael Ranseder	Suter	5	Retirement	25	
DNS	6	(Spain) Alex Debón	FTR		Did not start		
DNQ	63	(France) Mike Di Meglio	Suter		Did not qualify		
DNQ	5	(Spain) Joan Olivé	Promoharris		Did not qualify		
DNQ	66	(Japan) Hiromichi Kunikawa	Bimota		Did not qualify		
OFFICIAL MOTO2 REPORT

== 125 cc classification ==
The 125cc race was red-flagged after 7 laps due to rain. It was later restarted for 9 laps, with the grid determined by the running order before the suspension. The second part of the race determined the final result.

Pos.	No.	Rider	Manufacturer	Laps	Time/Retired	Grid	Points
1	93	(Spain) Marc Márquez	Derbi	9	16:27.878	11	25
2	40	(Spain) Nicolás Terol	Aprilia	9	+0.150	4	20
3	38	(United Kingdom) Bradley Smith	Aprilia	9	+0.212	1	16
4	94	(Germany) Jonas Folger	Aprilia	9	+18.378	17	13
5	39	(Spain) Luis Salom	Aprilia	9	+19.387	8	11
6	23	(Spain) Alberto Moncayo	Aprilia	9	+22.505	3	10
7	35	(Switzerland) Randy Krummenacher	Aprilia	9	+26.699	13	9
8	7	(Spain) Efrén Vázquez	Derbi	9	+26.703	14	8
9	99	(United Kingdom) Danny Webb	Aprilia	9	+31.503	2	7
10	44	(Spain) Pol Espargaró	Derbi	9	+40.823	12	6
11	84	(Czech Republic) Jakub Kornfeil	Aprilia	9	+47.006	15	5
12	15	(Italy) Simone Grotzkyj	Aprilia	9	+48.773	28	4
13	95	(Italy) Alessandro Tonucci	Aprilia	9	+54.418	24	3
14	92	(Italy) Luigi Morciano	Aprilia	9	+1:02.234	23	2
15	63	(Malaysia) Zulfahmi Khairuddin	Aprilia	9	+1:15.433	25	1
Ret	37	(France) Robin Barbosa	Aprilia	1	Accident	26	
Ret	11	(Germany) Sandro Cortese	Derbi	0	Retired in race 1	5	
Ret	12	(Spain) Esteve Rabat	Aprilia	0	Retired in race 1	16	
Ret	14	(France) Johann Zarco	Aprilia	0	Retired in race 1	18	
Ret	26	(Spain) Adrián Martín	Aprilia	0	Retired in race 1	19	
Ret	50	(Norway) Sturla Fagerhaug	Aprilia	0	Retired in race 1	20	
Ret	52	(United Kingdom) Danny Kent	Lambretta	0	Retired in race 1	10	
Ret	69	(France) Louis Rossi	Aprilia	0	Retired in race 1	21	
Ret	71	(Japan) Tomoyoshi Koyama	Aprilia	0	Not classified in race 1	7	
Ret	78	(Germany) Marcel Schrötter	Honda	0	Retired in race 1	6	
Ret	53	(Netherlands) Jasper Iwema	Aprilia	0	Retired in race 1	27	
Ret	87	(Italy) Luca Marconi	Aprilia	0	Retired in race 1	22	
DNS	32	(Italy) Lorenzo Savadori	Aprilia	0	Did not start	9	
DNQ	72	(Italy) Marco Ravaioli	Lambretta		Did not qualify		
DNQ	96	(Italy) Tommaso Gabrielli	Aprilia		Did not qualify		
OFFICIAL 125CC REPORT

== Championship standings after the race (MotoGP) ==
Below are the standings for the top five riders and constructors after round seventeen has concluded.

Riders' Championship standings

Pos.	Rider	Points
1	(Spain) Jorge Lorenzo	358
2	(Spain) Dani Pedrosa	236
3	(Italy) Valentino Rossi	217
4	(Australia) Casey Stoner	205
5	(Italy) Andrea Dovizioso	195

Constructors' Championship standings

Pos.	Constructor	Points
1	(Japan) Yamaha	379
2	(Japan) Honda	331
3	(Italy) Ducati	266
4	(Japan) Suzuki	101

- Note: Only the top five positions are included for both sets of standings.

Previous race: 2010 Australian Grand Prix	FIM Grand Prix World Championship; 2010 season	Next race: 2010 Valencian Grand Prix
Previous race: 2009 Portuguese Grand Prix	Portuguese motorcycle Grand Prix	Next race: 2011 Portuguese Grand Prix
