= 2010 Valencian Community motorcycle Grand Prix =

Final round of the 2010 FIM Road Racing World Championship season

2010 Valencian Community Grand Prix
Race details
- Race 18 of 18 races in the 2010 Grand Prix motorcycle racing season
- Date: 7 November 2010
- Official name: Gran Premio Generali de la Comunitat Valenciana
- Location: Circuit Ricardo Tormo
- Course: Permanent racing facility; 4.005 km (2.489 mi)

MotoGP
Pole position
- Rider: (Australia) Casey Stoner
- Time: 1:31.799
Fastest lap
- Rider: (Spain) Dani Pedrosa
- Time: 1:32.914
Podium
- First: (Spain) Jorge Lorenzo
- Second: (Australia) Casey Stoner
- Third: (Italy) Valentino Rossi

Moto2
Pole position
- Rider: (Spain) Toni Elías
- Time: 1:36.141
Fastest lap
- Rider: (Czech Republic) Karel Abraham
- Time: 1:36.611
Podium
- First: (Czech Republic) Karel Abraham
- Second: (Italy) Andrea Iannone
- Third: (Spain) Julián Simón

125cc
Pole position
- Rider: (Spain) Marc Márquez
- Time: 1:39.564
Fastest lap
- Rider: (Spain) Marc Márquez
- Time: 1:40.216
Podium
- First: (United Kingdom) Bradley Smith
- Second: (Spain) Pol Espargaró
- Third: (Spain) Nicolás Terol

The 2010 Valencian Community motorcycle Grand Prix was the final round of the 2010 Grand Prix motorcycle racing season. It took place on the weekend of 5–7 November 2010 at the Circuit Ricardo Tormo in Cheste, Valencian Community. It was Valentino Rossi's last race during his first stint at Yamaha before moving to Ducati Corse in 2011 and the last race at Ducati Corse for the rider he replaced, Casey Stoner who moved to Repsol Honda for 2011.

== MotoGP classification ==
Pos.	No.	Rider	Team	Manufacturer	Laps	Time/Retired	Grid	Points
1	99	(Spain) Jorge Lorenzo	Fiat Yamaha Team	Yamaha	30	46:44.622	2	25
2	27	(Australia) Casey Stoner	Ducati Team	Ducati	30	+4.576	1	20
3	46	(Italy) Valentino Rossi	Fiat Yamaha Team	Yamaha	30	+8.998	4	16
4	11	(United States) Ben Spies	Monster Yamaha Tech 3	Yamaha	30	+17.643	6	13
5	4	(Italy) Andrea Dovizioso	Repsol Honda Team	Honda	30	+19.160	9	11
6	58	(Italy) Marco Simoncelli	San Carlo Honda Gresini	Honda	30	+20.674	3	10
7	26	(Spain) Dani Pedrosa	Repsol Honda Team	Honda	30	+26.797	8	9
8	40	(Spain) Héctor Barberá	Páginas Amarillas Aspar	Ducati	30	+29.288	13	8
9	19	(Spain) Álvaro Bautista	Rizla Suzuki MotoGP	Suzuki	30	+29.451	17	7
10	14	(France) Randy de Puniet	LCR Honda MotoGP	Honda	30	+29.860	11	6
11	41	(Spain) Aleix Espargaró	Pramac Racing Team	Ducati	30	+31.761	12	5
12	5	(United States) Colin Edwards	Monster Yamaha Tech 3	Yamaha	30	+33.604	7	4
13	33	(Italy) Marco Melandri	San Carlo Honda Gresini	Honda	30	+36.622	10	3
14	7	(Japan) Hiroshi Aoyama	Interwetten Honda MotoGP	Honda	30	+38.968	15	2
15	71	(Spain) Carlos Checa	Pramac Racing Team	Ducati	30	+56.169	16	1
Ret	65	(Italy) Loris Capirossi	Rizla Suzuki MotoGP	Suzuki	13	Retirement	14	
Ret	69	(United States) Nicky Hayden	Ducati Team	Ducati	2	Accident	5	

== Moto2 classification ==
Pos.	No.	Rider	Manufacturer	Laps	Time/Retired	Grid	Points
1	17	(Czech Republic) Karel Abraham	FTR	27	43:49.499	9	25
2	29	(Italy) Andrea Iannone	Speed Up	27	+0.522	3	20
3	60	(Spain) Julián Simón	Suter	27	+0.583	7	16
4	12	(Switzerland) Thomas Lüthi	Moriwaki	27	+0.760	10	13
5	45	(United Kingdom) Scott Redding	Suter	27	+4.205	4	11
6	15	(San Marino) Alex de Angelis	Motobi	27	+5.385	5	10
7	3	(Italy) Simone Corsi	Motobi	27	+11.399	20	9
8	40	(Spain) Sergio Gadea	Pons Kalex	27	+21.420	21	8
9	77	(Switzerland) Dominique Aegerter	Suter	27	+22.439	17	7
10	2	(Hungary) Gábor Talmácsi	Speed Up	27	+22.912	12	6
11	16	(France) Jules Cluzel	Suter	27	+23.511	11	5
12	9	(United States) Kenny Noyes	Promoharris	27	+25.169	13	4
13	6	(Spain) Alex Debón	FTR	27	+30.571	25	3
14	68	(Colombia) Yonny Hernández	BQR-Moto2	27	+31.077	24	2
15	19	(Belgium) Xavier Siméon	Moriwaki	27	+31.276	19	1
16	46	(Spain) Javier Forés	AJR	27	+33.381	15	
17	25	(Italy) Alex Baldolini	I.C.P.	27	+33.548	28	
18	72	(Japan) Yuki Takahashi	Tech 3	27	+37.556	22	
19	71	(Italy) Claudio Corti	Suter	27	+38.602	26	
20	56	(Austria) Michael Ranseder	Suter	27	+38.763	23	
21	55	(Spain) Héctor Faubel	Suter	27	+39.540	16	
22	14	(Thailand) Ratthapark Wilairot	Bimota	27	+39.835	33	
23	43	(Spain) Román Ramos	MIR Racing	27	+39.849	14	
24	35	(Italy) Raffaele De Rosa	Tech 3	27	+40.519	27	
25	44	(Italy) Roberto Rolfo	Suter	27	+42.803	18	
26	63	(France) Mike Di Meglio	Suter	27	+44.234	30	
27	8	(Australia) Anthony West	MZ-RE Honda	27	+1:01.722	36	
28	5	(Spain) Joan Olivé	Promoharris	27	+1:02.031	37	
29	61	(Ukraine) Vladimir Ivanov	Moriwaki	27	+1:09.526	32	
30	24	(Spain) Toni Elías	Moriwaki	27	+1:25.529	1	
31	88	(Spain) Yannick Guerra	Moriwaki	26	+1 lap	41	
32	95	(Qatar) Mashel Al Naimi	BQR-Moto2	26	+1 lap	40	
33	66	(Japan) Hiromichi Kunikawa	Bimota	26	+1 lap	42	
Ret	80	(Spain) Axel Pons	Pons Kalex	26	Accident	29	
Ret	39	(Venezuela) Robertino Pietri	Suter	22	Retirement	38	
Ret	10	(Spain) Fonsi Nieto	Moriwaki	18	Retirement	31	
Ret	70	(Italy) Ferruccio Lamborghini	Moriwaki	17	Retirement	35	
Ret	65	(Germany) Stefan Bradl	Suter	11	Accident	2	
Ret	54	(Turkey) Kenan Sofuoğlu	Suter	9	Retirement	6	
Ret	31	(Spain) Carmelo Morales	Suter	7	Retirement	8	
Ret	53	(France) Valentin Debise	ADV	4	Accident	39	
DNS	4	(Spain) Ricard Cardús	Bimota	0	Did not start	34	
OFFICIAL MOTO2 REPORT

== 125 cc classification ==
Pos.	No.	Rider	Manufacturer	Laps	Time/Retired	Grid	Points
1	38	(United Kingdom) Bradley Smith	Aprilia	24	40:25.648	3	25
2	44	(Spain) Pol Espargaró	Derbi	24	+2.786	5	20
3	40	(Spain) Nicolás Terol	Aprilia	24	+3.149	2	16
4	93	(Spain) Marc Márquez	Derbi	24	+8.326	1	13
5	11	(Germany) Sandro Cortese	Derbi	24	+24.375	4	11
6	12	(Spain) Esteve Rabat	Aprilia	24	+26.743	6	10
7	71	(Japan) Tomoyoshi Koyama	Aprilia	24	+26.823	11	9
8	7	(Spain) Efrén Vázquez	Derbi	24	+27.634	7	8
9	35	(Switzerland) Randy Krummenacher	Aprilia	24	+41.211	10	7
10	39	(Spain) Luis Salom	Aprilia	24	+41.279	8	6
11	23	(Spain) Alberto Moncayo	Aprilia	24	+1:02.540	15	5
12	78	(Germany) Marcel Schrötter	Honda	24	+1:02.999	17	4
13	55	(Spain) Isaac Viñales	Aprilia	24	+1:08.522	16	3
14	15	(Italy) Simone Grotzkyj	Aprilia	24	+1:08.798	18	2
15	84	(Czech Republic) Jakub Kornfeil	Aprilia	24	+1:24.798	20	1
16	99	(United Kingdom) Danny Webb	Aprilia	24	+1:27.614	14	
17	56	(Hungary) Péter Sebestyén	Aprilia	24	+1:38.939	19	
18	58	(Spain) Joan Perelló	Honda	24	+1:39.356	25	
19	32	(Italy) Lorenzo Savadori	Aprilia	24	+1:40.387	21	
20	63	(Malaysia) Zulfahmi Khairuddin	Aprilia	23	+1 lap	24	
21	73	(United Kingdom) Taylor Mackenzie	Honda	23	+1 lap	29	
22	70	(United Kingdom) John McPhee	Honda	23	+1 lap	31	
Ret	50	(Norway) Sturla Fagerhaug	Aprilia	23	Accident	27	
Ret	31	(Finland) Niklas Ajo	Derbi	21	Retirement	23	
Ret	72	(Italy) Marco Ravaioli	Lambretta	20	Retirement	30	
Ret	14	(France) Johann Zarco	Aprilia	19	Accident	13	
Ret	59	(Spain) Johnny Rosell	Honda	19	Retirement	26	
Ret	52	(United Kingdom) Danny Kent	Lambretta	15	Retirement	22	
Ret	69	(France) Louis Rossi	Aprilia	12	Retirement	28	
Ret	94	(Germany) Jonas Folger	Aprilia	10	Retirement	12	
Ret	96	(Italy) Tommaso Gabrielli	Aprilia	10	Accident	32	
Ret	26	(Spain) Adrián Martín	Aprilia	5	Retirement	9	
OFFICIAL 125CC REPORT

== Championship standings after the race (MotoGP) ==
Below are the standings for the top five riders and constructors after round eighteen has concluded.

Riders' Championship standings

Pos.	Rider	Points
1	(Spain) Jorge Lorenzo	383
2	(Spain) Dani Pedrosa	245
3	(Italy) Valentino Rossi	233
4	(Australia) Casey Stoner	225
5	(Italy) Andrea Dovizioso	206

Constructors' Championship standings

Pos.	Constructor	Points
1	(Japan) Yamaha	404
2	(Japan) Honda	342
3	(Italy) Ducati	286
4	(Japan) Suzuki	108

- Note: Only the top five positions are included for both sets of standings.

Previous race: 2010 Portuguese Grand Prix	FIM Grand Prix World Championship; 2010 season	Next race: 2011 Qatar Grand Prix
Previous race: 2009 Valencian Grand Prix	Valencian Community motorcycle Grand Prix	Next race: 2011 Valencian Grand Prix
