= 2010 Malaysian motorcycle Grand Prix =

15th round of the 2010 FIM Road Racing World Championship season

(Malaysia) 2010 Malaysian Grand Prix
Race details
- Race 15 of 18 races in the 2010 Grand Prix motorcycle racing season
- Date: 10 October 2010
- Official name: Shell Advance Malaysian Motorcycle Grand Prix
- Location: Sepang International Circuit
- Course: Permanent racing facility; 5.543 km (3.444 mi)

MotoGP
Pole position
- Rider: (Spain) Jorge Lorenzo
- Time: 2:01.537
Fastest lap
- Rider: (Italy) Valentino Rossi
- Time: 2:02.117
Podium
- First: (Italy) Valentino Rossi
- Second: (Italy) Andrea Dovizioso
- Third: (Spain) Jorge Lorenzo

Moto2
Pole position
- Rider: (Spain) Julián Simón
- Time: 2:08.562
Fastest lap
- Rider: (Spain) Julián Simón
- Time: 2:08.691
Podium
- First: (Italy) Roberto Rolfo
- Second: (San Marino) Alex de Angelis
- Third: (Italy) Andrea Iannone

125cc
Pole position
- Rider: (Spain) Marc Márquez
- Time: 2:13.398
Fastest lap
- Rider: (Spain) Marc Márquez
- Time: 2:13.773
Podium
- First: (Spain) Marc Márquez
- Second: (Spain) Pol Espargaró
- Third: (Spain) Nicolás Terol

The 2010 Malaysian motorcycle Grand Prix was the fifteenth round of the 2010 Grand Prix motorcycle racing season. It took place on the weekend of 8–10 October 2010 at the Sepang International Circuit.

== MotoGP classification ==
Pos.	No.	Rider	Team	Manufacturer	Laps	Time/Retired	Grid	Points
1	46	(Italy) Valentino Rossi	Fiat Yamaha Team	Yamaha	20	41:03.448	6	25
2	4	(Italy) Andrea Dovizioso	Repsol Honda Team	Honda	20	+0.224	3	20
3	99	(Spain) Jorge Lorenzo	Fiat Yamaha Team	Yamaha	20	+6.035	1	16
4	11	(United States) Ben Spies	Monster Yamaha Tech 3	Yamaha	20	+13.676	4	13
5	19	(Spain) Álvaro Bautista	Rizla Suzuki MotoGP	Suzuki	20	+15.402	8	11
6	69	(United States) Nicky Hayden	Ducati Team	Ducati	20	+18.826	2	10
7	7	(Japan) Hiroshi Aoyama	Interwetten Honda MotoGP	Honda	20	+20.218	14	9
8	58	(Italy) Marco Simoncelli	San Carlo Honda Gresini	Honda	20	+23.574	11	8
9	33	(Italy) Marco Melandri	San Carlo Honda Gresini	Honda	20	+23.964	10	7
10	14	(France) Randy de Puniet	LCR Honda MotoGP	Honda	20	+31.850	13	6
11	40	(Spain) Héctor Barberá	Páginas Amarillas Aspar	Ducati	20	+38.579	15	5
12	36	(Finland) Mika Kallio	Pramac Racing Team	Ducati	20	+38.849	16	4
NC	5	(United States) Colin Edwards	Monster Yamaha Tech 3	Yamaha	14	+6 laps	7	
Ret	41	(Spain) Aleix Espargaró	Pramac Racing Team	Ducati	6	Accident	12	
Ret	65	(Italy) Loris Capirossi	Rizla Suzuki MotoGP	Suzuki	4	Retirement	9	
Ret	27	(Australia) Casey Stoner	Ducati Team	Ducati	0	Accident	5	

== Moto2 classification ==
Pos.	No.	Rider	Manufacturer	Laps	Time/Retired	Grid	Points
1	44	(Italy) Roberto Rolfo	Suter	19	41:09.412	5	25
2	15	(San Marino) Alex de Angelis	Motobi	19	+0.040	2	20
3	29	(Italy) Andrea Iannone	Speed Up	19	+5.915	6	16
4	24	(Spain) Toni Elías	Moriwaki	19	+6.322	4	13
5	6	(Spain) Alex Debón	FTR	19	+11.912	10	11
6	17	(Czech Republic) Karel Abraham	FTR	19	+12.458	7	10
7	65	(Germany) Stefan Bradl	Suter	19	+12.519	22	9
8	77	(Switzerland) Dominique Aegerter	Suter	19	+12.589	11	8
9	16	(France) Jules Cluzel	Suter	19	+15.010	13	7
10	3	(Italy) Simone Corsi	Motobi	19	+16.707	39	6
11	55	(Spain) Héctor Faubel	Suter	19	+20.179	17	5
12	25	(Italy) Alex Baldolini	I.C.P.	19	+20.462	14	4
13	68	(Colombia) Yonny Hernández	BQR-Moto2	19	+21.638	27	3
14	56	(Austria) Michael Ranseder	Suter	19	+22.388	9	2
15	71	(Italy) Claudio Corti	Suter	19	+24.512	12	1
16	14	(Thailand) Ratthapark Wilairot	Bimota	19	+26.366	23	
17	80	(Spain) Axel Pons	Pons Kalex	19	+30.730	24	
18	9	(United States) Kenny Noyes	Promoharris	19	+31.080	25	
19	10	(Spain) Fonsi Nieto	Moriwaki	19	+32.239	16	
20	53	(France) Valentin Debise	ADV	19	+33.804	29	
21	60	(Spain) Julián Simón	Suter	19	+39.448	1	
22	87	(Malaysia) Mohamad Zamri Baba	Moriwaki	19	+46.031	31	
23	5	(Spain) Joan Olivé	Promoharris	19	+47.257	28	
24	8	(Australia) Anthony West	MZ-RE Honda	19	+50.058	26	
25	28	(Japan) Kazuki Watanabe	Suter	19	+50.830	32	
26	63	(France) Mike Di Meglio	Suter	19	+51.971	19	
27	39	(Venezuela) Robertino Pietri	Suter	19	+59.155	34	
28	66	(Japan) Hiromichi Kunikawa	Bimota	19	+1:16.759	38	
29	95	(Qatar) Mashel Al Naimi	BQR-Moto2	19	+1:43.949	37	
Ret	2	(Hungary) Gábor Talmácsi	Speed Up	13	Accident	15	
Ret	45	(United Kingdom) Scott Redding	Suter	13	Retirement	8	
Ret	40	(Spain) Sergio Gadea	Pons Kalex	13	Retirement	21	
Ret	35	(Italy) Raffaele De Rosa	Tech 3	10	Retirement	20	
Ret	72	(Japan) Yuki Takahashi	Tech 3	8	Accident	18	
Ret	12	(Switzerland) Thomas Lüthi	Moriwaki	7	Accident	3	
Ret	61	(Ukraine) Vladimir Ivanov	Moriwaki	6	Accident	33	
Ret	46	(Spain) Javier Forés	Bimota	6	Retirement	30	
Ret	70	(Italy) Ferruccio Lamborghini	Moriwaki	6	Retirement	36	
Ret	88	(Spain) Yannick Guerra	Moriwaki	1	Accident	35	
OFFICIAL MOTO2 REPORT

== 125 cc classification ==
Pos.	No.	Rider	Manufacturer	Laps	Time/Retired	Grid	Points
1	93	(Spain) Marc Márquez	Derbi	18	40:29.035	1	25
2	44	(Spain) Pol Espargaró	Derbi	18	+2.341	4	20
3	40	(Spain) Nicolás Terol	Aprilia	18	+3.656	3	16
4	7	(Spain) Efrén Vázquez	Derbi	18	+6.780	5	13
5	38	(United Kingdom) Bradley Smith	Aprilia	18	+7.133	2	11
6	11	(Germany) Sandro Cortese	Derbi	18	+7.297	6	10
7	12	(Spain) Esteve Rabat	Aprilia	18	+26.648	7	9
8	39	(Spain) Luis Salom	Aprilia	18	+29.339	8	8
9	71	(Japan) Tomoyoshi Koyama	Aprilia	18	+29.339	9	7
10	35	(Switzerland) Randy Krummenacher	Aprilia	18	+29.365	10	6
11	14	(France) Johann Zarco	Aprilia	18	+36.329	11	5
12	23	(Spain) Alberto Moncayo	Aprilia	18	+37.545	14	4
13	26	(Spain) Adrián Martín	Aprilia	18	+51.262	15	3
14	84	(Czech Republic) Jakub Kornfeil	Aprilia	18	+54.634	19	2
15	78	(Germany) Marcel Schrötter	Honda	18	+54.635	18	1
16	63	(Malaysia) Zulfahmi Khairuddin	Aprilia	18	+58.581	22	
17	69	(France) Louis Rossi	Aprilia	18	+1:15.218	17	
18	72	(Italy) Marco Ravaioli	Lambretta	18	+1:15.595	23	
19	96	(Italy) Tommaso Gabrielli	Aprilia	18	+2:00.178	26	
Ret	99	(United Kingdom) Danny Webb	Aprilia	11	Accident	12	
Ret	52	(United Kingdom) Danny Kent	Lambretta	11	Retirement	13	
Ret	53	(Netherlands) Jasper Iwema	Aprilia	7	Retirement	24	
Ret	50	(Norway) Sturla Fagerhaug	Aprilia	6	Retirement	21	
Ret	15	(Italy) Simone Grotzkyj	Aprilia	5	Accident	16	
Ret	87	(Italy) Luca Marconi	Aprilia	5	Retirement	25	
Ret	32	(Italy) Lorenzo Savadori	Aprilia	3	Retirement	20	
DNS	94	(Germany) Jonas Folger	Aprilia		Did not start		
OFFICIAL 125CC REPORT

== Championship standings after the race (MotoGP) ==
Below are the standings for the top five riders and constructors after round fifteen has concluded.

Riders' Championship standings

Pos.	Rider	Points
1	(Spain) Jorge Lorenzo	313
2	(Spain) Dani Pedrosa	228
3	(Italy) Valentino Rossi	181
4	(Australia) Casey Stoner	180
5	(Italy) Andrea Dovizioso	179

Constructors' Championship standings

Pos.	Constructor	Points
1	(Japan) Yamaha	334
2	(Japan) Honda	305
3	(Italy) Ducati	230
4	(Japan) Suzuki	92

- Note: Only the top five positions are included for both sets of standings.

Previous race: 2010 Japanese Grand Prix	FIM Grand Prix World Championship; 2010 season	Next race: 2010 Australian Grand Prix
Previous race: 2009 Malaysian Grand Prix	Malaysian motorcycle Grand Prix	Next race: 2011 Malaysian Grand Prix
