= Alexander Lundh =

Swedish motorcycle racer (born 1986)

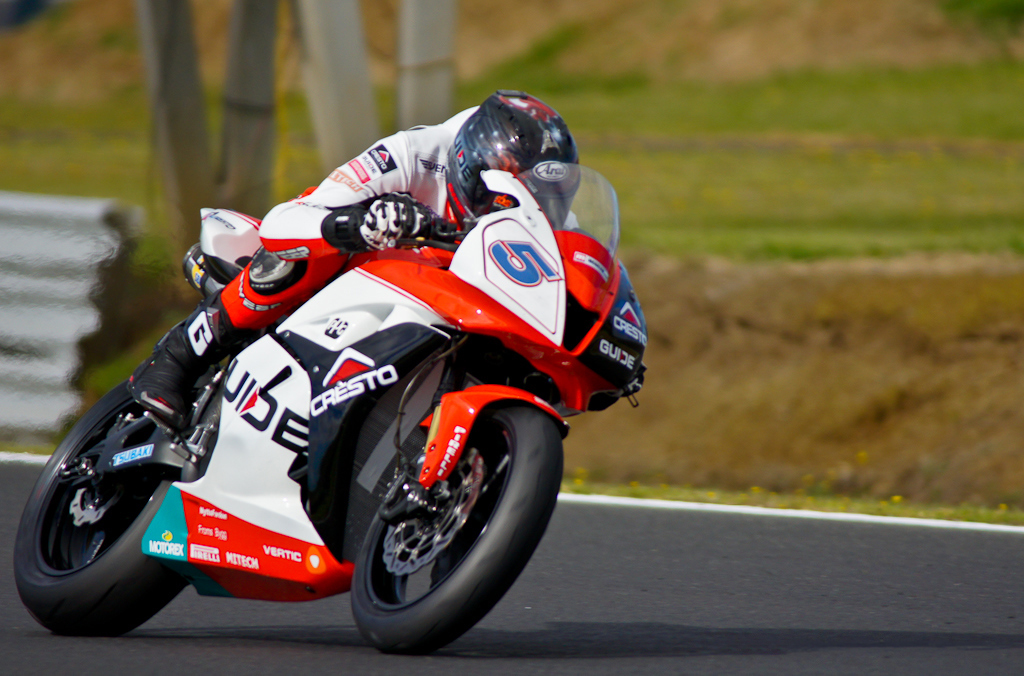
- Lundh in 2011
- Nationality: Swedish
- Born: 30 October 1986 (age 40); Värnamo, Sweden
Motorcycle racing career statistics
Moto2 World Championship
Active years	2012
Manufacturers	MZ FTR, MZ-RE Honda
2012 championship position	NC (0 pts)
Starts / Wins / Podiums / Poles / F. laps / Points; 7 / 0 / 0 / 0 / 0 / 0
Superbike World Championship
Active years	2012–2013
Manufacturers	Kawasaki
2013 championship position	27th (10 pts)
Starts / Wins / Podiums / Poles / F. laps / Points; 14 / 0 / 0 / 0 / 0 / 18
Supersport World Championship
Active years	2010–2012
Manufacturers	Honda
2012 championship position	NC (0 pts)
Starts / Wins / Podiums / Poles / F. laps / Points; 24 / 0 / 0 / 0 / 0 / 53

Alexander Lundh (born 30 October 1986) is a Swedish motorcycle racer.

== Career statistics ==
2005 - 33rd, European Superstock 600 Championship, Honda CBR600RR
2006 - 25th, European Superstock 600 Championship, Honda CBR600RR
2009 - 23rd, FIM Superstock 1000 Cup, Honda

=== European Superstock 600 ===
==== Races by year ====
(key) (Races in bold indicate pole position, races in italics indicate fastest lap)

Year	Bike	1	2	3	4	5	6	7	8	9	10	Pos	Pts
2005	Honda	VAL	MNZ	SIL	MIS	BRN; 19	BRA	ASS; 20	LAU; 12	IMO	MAG; DNS	33rd	4
2006	Honda	VAL; 25	MNZ; Ret	SIL; 22	MIS; 20	BRN; DNS	BRA; 19	ASS; Ret	LAU; 5	IMO; 19	MAG; 21	25th	11

=== FIM Superstock 1000 Cup ===
==== Races by year ====
(key) (Races in bold indicate pole position) (Races in italics indicate fastest lap)

Year	Bike	1	2	3	4	5	6	7	8	9	10	Pos	Pts
2009	Honda	VAL	NED	MNZ	SMR	DON	BRN; 7	NŰR; 18	IMO	MAG	ALG	23rd	9

=== Supersport World Championship ===
==== Races by year ====
Year	Bike	1	2	3	4	5	6	7	8	9	10	11	12	13	Pos.	Pts
2010	Honda	AUS; Ret	POR; 13	SPA; 8	NED; 11	ITA; 13	RSA; 13	USA; 15	SMR; Ret	CZE; Ret	GBR; DNS	GER	ITA; 15	FRA; Ret	16th	24
2011	Honda	AUS; 9	EUR; 10	NED; DNS	ITA; 19	SMR; 15	SPA; 16	CZE; 12	GBR; 13	GER; 13	ITA; Ret	FRA; 14	POR; 13		16th	29
2012	Honda	AUS	ITA	NED	ITA	EUR	SMR	SPA	CZE	GBR; 16	RUS	GER	POR	FRA	NC	0

=== Grand Prix motorcycle racing ===
==== By season ====
Season	Class	Motorcycle	Team	Race	Win	Podium	Pole	FLap	Pts	Plcd
2012	Moto2	MZ FTR	Cresto Guide MZ Racing	7	0	0	0	0	0	NC
2012	Moto2	MZ-RE Honda	Cresto Guide MZ Racing	7	0	0	0	0	0	NC
Total				**7**	**0**	**0**	**0**	**0**	**0**	

==== Races by year ====
(key)

Year	Class	Bike	1	2	3	4	5	6	7	8	9	10	11	12	13	14	15	16	17	Pos.	Pts
2012	Moto2	MZ FTR	QAT; 28																	NC	0
2012	Moto2	MZ-RE Honda		SPA; 24	POR; 25	FRA; Ret	CAT; 23	GBR; 27	NED; Ret	GER	ITA	INP	CZE	RSM	ARA	JPN	MAL	AUS	VAL	NC	0

=== Superbike World Championship ===
==== Races by year ====
Year	Make	1		2		3		4		5		6		7		8		9		10		11		12		13		14		Pos.	Pts
Year	Make	R1	R2	R1	R2	R1	R2	R1	R2	R1	R2	R1	R2	R1	R2	R1	R2	R1	R2	R1	R2	R1	R2	R1	R2	R1	R2	R1	R2	Pos.	Pts
2012	Kawasaki	AUS	AUS	ITA	ITA	NED	NED	ITA	ITA	EUR	EUR	USA	USA	SMR	SMR	SPA	SPA	CZE	CZE	GBR	GBR	RUS; 14	RUS; 14	GER; 16	GER; Ret	POR; 14	POR; 14	FRA; DNS	FRA; DNS	29th	8
2013	Kawasaki	AUS; 13	AUS; 15	SPA; Ret	SPA; 13	NED; DNS	NED; DNS	ITA	ITA	GBR; Ret	GBR; 15	POR; Ret	POR; 14	ITA; DNS	ITA; DNS	RUS	RUS	GBR	GBR	GER	GER	TUR	TUR	USA	USA	FRA	FRA	SPA	SPA	27th	10
