= 2012 Moscow Superbike World Championship round =

(Russia) 2012 Moscow Superbike World Championship round
Round details
- Round 11 of 14 rounds in the 2012 Superbike World Championship. and Round 10 of 13 rounds in the 2012 Supersport World Championship.
- Date: 26 August, 2012
- Location: Moscow
- Course: Permanent racing facility 3.955 km (2.458 mi)

Superbike World Championship
Pole position
(Spain) Carlos Checa
1:34.193
Fastest lap race 1	Fastest lap race 2
(United Kingdom) Leon Haslam	(Italy) Marco Melandri
1:36.729	1:35.794

Supersport World Championship
Pole position
(France) Jules Cluzel
1:37.347
Fastest lap
(France) Jules Cluzel
1:38.167

The 2012 Moscow Superbike World Championship round was the eleventh round of the 2012 Superbike World Championship. It took place over the weekend of 24–26 August 2012 at the Moscow Raceway located in Volokolamsk, Russia. This was the first time the Superbike World Championship series raced in Russia.

== Superbike ==
=== Race 1 classification ===
Pos	No.	Rider	Bike	Laps	Time	Grid	Points
1	66	(United Kingdom) Tom Sykes	Kawasaki ZX-10R	25	41:07.852	2	25
2	33	(Italy) Marco Melandri	BMW S1000RR	25	+8.878	5	20
3	3	(Italy) Max Biaggi	Aprilia RSV4 Factory	25	+12.603	7	16
4	58	(Republic of Ireland) Eugene Laverty	Aprilia RSV4 Factory	25	+13.027	3	13
5	84	(Italy) Michel Fabrizio	BMW S1000RR	25	+29.582	17	11
6	91	(United Kingdom) Leon Haslam	BMW S1000RR	25	+30.587	4	10
7	59	(Italy) Niccolò Canepa	Ducati 1098R	25	+32.170	10	9
8	87	(Italy) Lorenzo Zanetti	Ducati 1098R	25	+34.704	14	8
9	21	(United States) John Hopkins	Suzuki GSX-R1000	25	+40.366	11	7
10	44	(Spain) David Salom	Kawasaki ZX-10R	25	+41.143	16	6
11	76	(France) Loris Baz	Kawasaki ZX-10R	25	+44.363	9	5
12	86	(Italy) Ayrton Badovini	BMW S1000RR	25	+47.813	19	4
13	4	(Japan) Hiroshi Aoyama	Honda CBR1000RR	25	+52.650	12	3
14	5	(Sweden) Alexander Lundh	Kawasaki ZX-10R	25	+1:20.273	20	2
15	2	(United Kingdom) Leon Camier	Suzuki GSX-R1000	23	+2 lap	18	1
16	69	(South Africa) David McFadden	Kawasaki ZX-10R	22	+3 lap	21	
Ret	19	(United Kingdom) Chaz Davies	Aprilia RSV4 Factory	23	Accident	13	
Ret	34	(Italy) Davide Giugliano	Ducati 1098R	13	Accident	8	
Ret	65	(United Kingdom) Jonathan Rea	Honda CBR1000RR	10	Accident	6	
Ret	7	(Spain) Carlos Checa	Ducati 1098R	2	Accident	1	
Ret	50	(France) Sylvain Guintoli	Ducati 1098R	2	Accident	15	
Report:

=== Race 2 classification ===
Pos	No.	Rider	Bike	Laps	Time	Grid	Points
1	33	(Italy) Marco Melandri	BMW S1000RR	25	40:14.677	5	25
2	66	(United Kingdom) Tom Sykes	Kawasaki ZX-10R	25	+0.976	2	20
3	19	(United Kingdom) Chaz Davies	Aprilia RSV4 Factory	25	+4.213	13	3
4	7	(Spain) Carlos Checa	Ducati 1098R	25	+5.954	1	13
5	2	(United Kingdom) Leon Camier	Suzuki GSX-R1000	25	+13.568	18	11
6	34	(Italy) Davide Giugliano	Ducati 1098R	25	+15.173	8	10
7	65	(United Kingdom) Jonathan Rea	Honda CBR1000RR	25	+23.125	6	9
8	86	(Italy) Ayrton Badovini	BMW S1000RR	25	+23.696	19	8
9	76	(France) Loris Baz	Kawasaki ZX-10R	25	+23.884	9	7
10	87	(Italy) Lorenzo Zanetti	Ducati 1098R	25	+24.096	14	6
11	50	(France) Sylvain Guintoli	Ducati 1098R	25	+24.881	15	5
12	21	(United States) John Hopkins	Suzuki GSX-R1000	25	+39.643	11	4
13	44	(Spain) David Salom	Kawasaki ZX-10R	25	+1:01.449	16	3
14	5	(Sweden) Alexander Lundh	Kawasaki ZX-10R	25	+1:36.596	20	2
Ret	58	(Republic of Ireland) Eugene Laverty	Aprilia RSV4 Factory	24	Accident	3	
Ret	91	(United Kingdom) Leon Haslam	BMW S1000RR	9	Accident	4	
Ret	3	(Italy) Max Biaggi	Aprilia RSV4 Factory	9	Accident	7	
Ret	59	(Italy) Niccolò Canepa	Ducati 1098R	1	Retirement	10	
Ret	84	(Italy) Michel Fabrizio	BMW S1000RR	0	Accident	17	
Ret	69	(South Africa) David McFadden	Kawasaki ZX-10R	0	Accident	21	
Ret	4	(Japan) Hiroshi Aoyama	Honda CBR1000RR	0	Accident	12	
Report:

== Supersport ==
=== Race classification ===
Pos	No.	Rider	Bike	Laps	Time	Grid	Points
1	54	(Turkey) Kenan Sofuoğlu	Kawasaki ZX-6R	22	36:13.935	2	25
2	16	(France) Jules Cluzel	Honda CBR600RR	22	+5.022	1	20
3	65	(Russia) Vladimir Leonov	Yamaha YZF-R6	22	+13.018	7	16
4	32	(South Africa) Sheridan Morais	Kawasaki ZX-6R	22	+16.504	5	13
5	23	(Australia) Broc Parkes	Honda CBR600RR	22	+32.568	4	11
6	99	(France) Fabien Foret	Kawasaki ZX-6R	22	+33.854	6	10
7	8	(Italy) Andrea Antonelli	Yamaha YZF-R6	22	+34.377	8	9
8	14	(Hungary) Gábor Talmácsi	Honda CBR600RR	22	+34.471	10	8
9	22	(Italy) Roberto Tamburini	Honda CBR600RR	22	+37.727	11	7
10	20	(South Africa) Matthew Scholtz	Honda CBR600RR	22	+37.802	12	6
11	25	(Italy) Alex Baldolini	Triumph Daytona 675	22	+38.103	9	5
12	11	(United Kingdom) Sam Lowes	Honda CBR600RR	22	+42.645	3	4
13	34	(South Africa) Ronan Quarmby	Honda CBR600RR	22	+42.784	16	3
14	93	(France) Florian Marino	Kawasaki ZX-6R	22	+54.753	26	2
15	87	(Italy) Luca Marconi	Yamaha YZF-R6	22	+1:00.150	21	1
16	4	(United Kingdom) Dan Linfoot	Kawasaki ZX-6R	22	+1:00.261	23	
17	61	(Italy) Fabio Menghi	Yamaha YZF-R6	22	+1:00.545	19	
18	53	(France) Valentin Debise	Honda CBR600RR	22	+1:05.189	14	
19	40	(United Kingdom) Martin Jessopp	Honda CBR600RR	22	+1:06.004	24	
20	38	(Hungary) Balázs Németh	Honda CBR600RR	22	+1:13.510	27	
21	79	(Russia) Maxime Averkin	Kawasaki ZX-6R	22	+1:14.726	28	
22	41	(Italy) Federico D'Annunzio	Honda CBR600RR	22	+1:15.508	25	
23	13	(Italy) Dino Lombardi	Yamaha YZF-R6	22	+1:17.155	20	
24	10	(Hungary) Imre Tóth	Honda CBR600RR	22	+1:17.981	22	
25	125	(Italy) Danilo Marrancone	Honda CBR600RR	22	+1:18.651	30	
26	70	(Switzerland) Robin Mulhauser	Yamaha YZF-R6	22	+1:19.209	29	
27	50	(Russia) Sergei Krapukhin	Yamaha YZF-R6	21	+1 lap	32	
28	33	(Austria) Yves Polzer	Yamaha YZF-R6	21	+1 lap	33	
Ret	24	(Russia) Eduard Blokhin	Yamaha YZF-R6	20	Accident	34	
Ret	137	(Poland) Andrzej Chmielewski	Honda CBR600RR	16	Retirement	31	
Ret	31	(Italy) Vittorio Iannuzzo	Triumph Daytona 675	9	Retirement	13	
Ret	98	(France) Romain Lanusse	Kawasaki ZX-6R	8	Accident	15	
Ret	64	(United States) Josh Day	Kawasaki ZX-6R	8	Retirement	17	
Ret	3	(Australia) Jed Metcher	Yamaha YZF-R6	2	Accident	18	
DNS	60	(Netherlands) Michael Van Der Mark	Honda CBR600RR		Did not start		
Report:
