= Vladimir Leonov (motorcyclist) =

Russian professional motorcycle racer (born 1987)

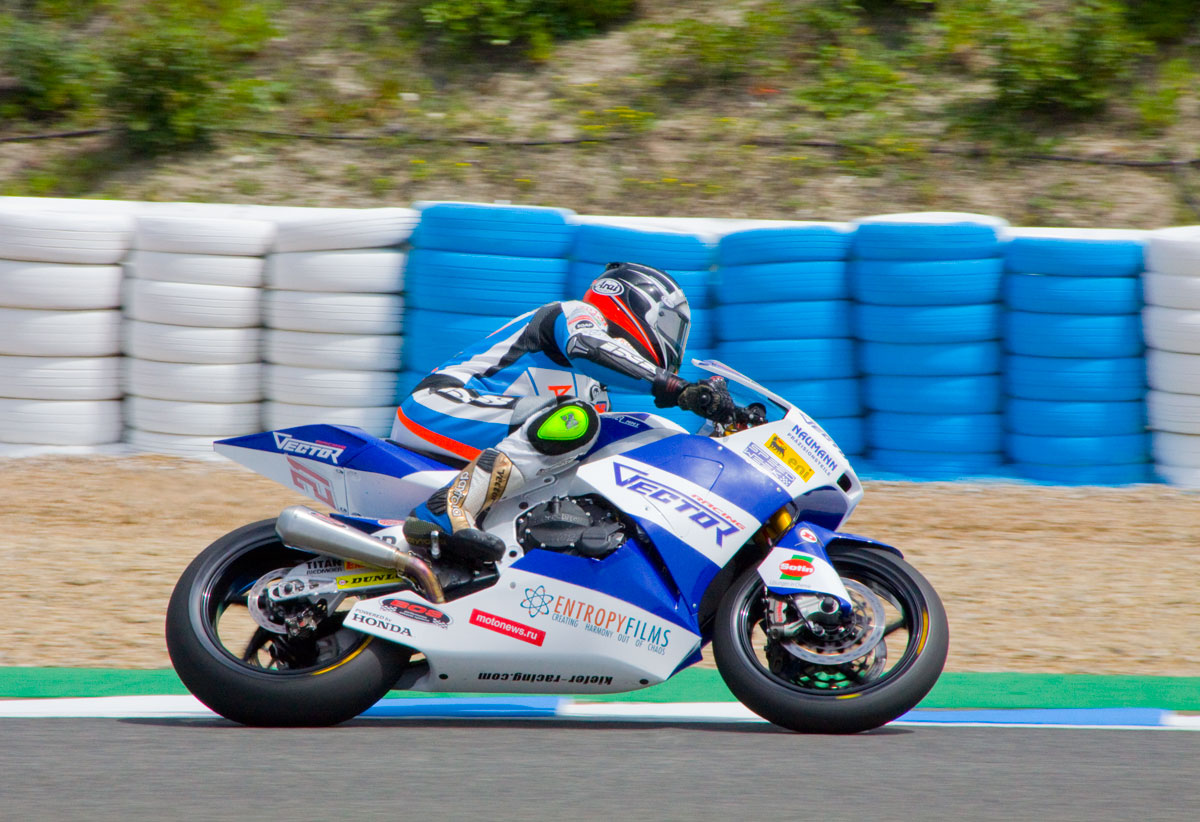
- Nationality: (Russia) Russian
- Born: 26 April 1987 (age 39); Donetsk, RSFSR, Soviet Union
Motorcycle racing career statistics
Moto2 World Championship
Active years	2010
Manufacturers	Suter
Starts / Wins / Podiums / Poles / F. laps / Points; 7 / 0 / 0 / 0 / 0 / 0
250cc World Championship
Active years	2009
Manufacturers	Aprilia
Starts / Wins / Podiums / Poles / F. laps / Points; 15 / 0 / 0 / 0 / 0 / 9
Superbike World Championship
Active years	2018
Manufacturers	Kawasaki
Starts / Wins / Podiums / Poles / F. laps / Points; 3 / 0 / 0 / 0 / 0 / 0
Supersport World Championship
Active years	2011–2015
Manufacturers	Yamaha, MV Agusta, Honda
Starts / Wins / Podiums / Poles / F. laps / Points; 33 / 0 / 3 / 0 / 0 / 141

Vladimir Vladimirovich Leonov (Russian: Владимир Владимирович Леонов; born 26 April 1987) is a Russian professional motorcycle racer. He has competed in the 250cc World Championship, the Moto2 World Championship and the Supersport World Championship. Leonov was the first Russian to achieve a podium finish in the latter category, a third place in rainy conditions in the 2012 Assen round.

== Career statistics ==
2007 - 37th, European Superstock 600 Championship, Yamaha YZF-R6

=== European Superstock 600 ===
==== Races by year ====
(key) (Races in bold indicate pole position, races in italics indicate fastest lap)

Year	Bike	1	2	3	4	5	6	7	8	9	10	11	12	Pos	Pts
2007	Yamaha	DON; 27	SPA; 17	ASS; 28	MNZ; 22	SIL; C	MIS; 21	BRN; 24	BRA; Ret	BRA; 15	LAU; Ret	VAL; 23	MAG	37th	1

=== Grand Prix motorcycle racing ===
==== By season ====
Season	Class	Motorcycle	Team	Race	Win	Podium	Pole	FLap	Pts	Plcd
2009	250cc	Aprilia	Viessmann Kiefer Racing	15	0	0	0	0	9	24th
2010	Moto2	Suter	Vector Kiefer Racing	7	0	0	0	0	0	NC
Total				**22**	**0**	**0**	**0**	**0**	**9**	

==== Races by year ====
(key)

Year	Class	Bike	1	2	3	4	5	6	7	8	9	10	11	12	13	14	15	16	17	Pos	Pts
2009	250cc	Aprilia	QAT; 18	JPN; 15	SPA; 19	FRA; 10	ITA; Ret	CAT; 20	NED; 16	GER; Ret	GBR	CZE; 19	INP; 15	RSM; 17	POR; Ret	AUS; Ret	MAL; 15	VAL; 17		24th	9
2010	Moto2	Suter	QAT; Ret	SPA; DNS	FRA; 27	ITA; 25	GBR; 29	NED; 29	CAT; Ret	GER; 24	CZE	INP	RSM	ARA	JPN	MAL	AUS	POR	VAL	NC	0

=== Supersport World Championship ===
==== Races by year ====
Year	Bike	1	2	3	4	5	6	7	8	9	10	11	12	13	Pos.	Pts
2011	Yamaha	AUS	EUR	NED	ITA	SMR; 17	SPA	CZE	GBR	GER	ITA	FRA	POR; 9		24th	7
2012	Yamaha	AUS; Ret	ITA; 6	NED; 3	ITA; Ret	EUR; DNS	SMR	SPA; Ret	CZE; 10	GBR; 18	RUS; 3	GER; DSQ	POR; 12	FRA; 17	11th	52
2013	Yamaha	AUS; Ret	SPA; 8	NED; 12	ITA; 7	GBR; 16	POR; 11	ITA; 3	RUS; C	GBR; 10	GER; Ret	TUR; 15	FRA; 9	SPA; 9	10th	63
2014	MV Agusta	AUS; Ret	SPA; 8	NED; 12	ITA; Ret	GBR; 15	MAL; 14	SMR	POR						19th	19
2014	Honda									SPA; 12	FRA; Ret	QAT			19th	19
2015	Yamaha	AUS	THA	SPA	NED	ITA	GBR	POR	ITA	MAL	SPA; Ret	FRA	QAT		NC	0

=== Superbike World Championship ===
==== Races by year ====
Year	Bike	1		2		3		4		5		6		7		8		9		10		11		12		13		Pos.	Pts
Year	Bike	R1	R2	R1	R2	R1	R2	R1	R2	R1	R2	R1	R2	R1	R2	R1	R2	R1	R2	R1	R2	R1	R2	R1	R2	R1	R2	Pos.	Pts
2018	Kawasaki	AUS	AUS	THA	THA	SPA; DNS	SPA; 17	NED	NED	ITA; Ret	ITA; Ret	GBR	GBR	CZE	CZE	USA	USA	ITA	ITA	POR	POR	FRA	FRA	ARG	ARG	QAT	QAT	NC	0
