= 2012 Supersport World Championship =

2012 Supersport World Championship
Previous:	2011	Next:	2013
Support series: Superbike World Championship; FIM Superstock 1000 Cup; European Superstock 600 Championship; European Junior Cup

The 2012 Supersport World Championship was the fourteenth season of the Supersport World Championship—the sixteenth taking into account the two held under the name of Supersport World Series. It began on 26 February at Phillip Island and ended on 7 October in Magny-Cours after 13 rounds.

Kenan Sofuoğlu won his third championship after having returned from Moto2.

== Race calendar and results ==
The provisional race schedule was publicly announced by the FIM on 24 September 2011 with thirteen confirmed rounds and two other rounds pending confirmation. Russia appeared for the first time in the calendar with a round at the brand-new Moscow Raceway. The calendar was updated in October 2011 with the confirmation of the Imola round, for a total of thirteen rounds, supporting the Superbike World Championship at every meeting except Miller Motorsports Park.

Round	Country	Circuit	Date	Pole position	Fastest lap	Winning rider	Winning team	Report
1	Australia	Phillip Island Grand Prix Circuit	26 February	(Australia) Broc Parkes	(France) Fabien Foret	(Turkey) Kenan Sofuoğlu	Kawasaki DeltaFin Lorenzini	Report
2	Italy	Autodromo Enzo e Dino Ferrari	1 April	(United Kingdom) Sam Lowes	(Australia) Broc Parkes	(France) Fabien Foret	Kawasaki Intermoto Step	Report
3	Netherlands	TT Circuit Assen	22 April	(United Kingdom) Sam Lowes	(Italy) Lorenzo Lanzi	(Italy) Lorenzo Lanzi	PRORACE	Report
4	Italy	Autodromo Nazionale Monza	6 May	(United Kingdom) Sam Lowes	(United Kingdom) Sam Lowes	(France) Jules Cluzel	PTR Honda	Report
5	United Kingdom	Donington Park	13 May	(France) Jules Cluzel	(United Kingdom) Sam Lowes	(United Kingdom) Sam Lowes	Bogdanka PTR Honda	Report
6	San Marino	Misano World Circuit	10 June	(United Kingdom) Sam Lowes	(France) Fabien Foret	(Turkey) Kenan Sofuoğlu	Kawasaki DeltaFin Lorenzini	Report
7	Spain	Motorland Aragón	1 July	(France) Jules Cluzel	(South Africa) Sheridan Morais	(United Kingdom) Sam Lowes	Bogdanka PTR Honda	Report
8	Czech Republic	Masaryk Circuit	22 July	(Turkey) Kenan Sofuoğlu	(Australia) Broc Parkes	(France) Fabien Foret	Kawasaki Intermoto Step	Report
9	United Kingdom	Silverstone Circuit	5 August	(France) Jules Cluzel	(France) Jules Cluzel	(France) Jules Cluzel	PTR Honda	Report
10	Russia	Moscow Raceway	26 August	(France) Jules Cluzel	(France) Jules Cluzel	(Turkey) Kenan Sofuoğlu	Kawasaki Lorenzini	Report
11	Germany	Nürburgring	9 September	(France) Jules Cluzel	(United Kingdom) Sam Lowes	(Turkey) Kenan Sofuoğlu	Kawasaki Lorenzini	Report
12	Portugal	Autódromo Internacional do Algarve	23 September	(Australia) Broc Parkes	(France) Jules Cluzel	(France) Jules Cluzel	PTR Honda	Report
13	France	Circuit de Nevers Magny-Cours	7 October	(Australia) Broc Parkes	(Turkey) Kenan Sofuoğlu	(France) Jules Cluzel	PTR Honda	Report

== Championship standings ==
=== Riders' standings ===
Pos.	Rider	Bike	AUS (Australia)	ITA (Italy)	NED (Netherlands)	ITA (Italy)	EUR (United Kingdom)	SMR (San Marino)	SPA (Spain)	CZE (Czech Republic)	GBR (United Kingdom)	RUS (Russia)	GER (Germany)	POR (Portugal)	FRA (France)	Pts
1	(Turkey) Kenan Sofuoğlu	Kawasaki	1	DSQ	2	3	2	1	5	**2**	5	1	1	2	4	231
2	(France) Jules Cluzel	Honda	4	Ret	6	1	**3**	2	**Ret**	5	**1**	**2**	**2**	1	1	210
3	(United Kingdom) Sam Lowes	Honda	5	**2**	**Ret**	**2**	1	**18**	1	4	2	12	13	5	2	172
4	(France) Fabien Foret	Kawasaki	2	1	Ret	12	10	8	2	1	6	6	3	3	5	171
5	(Australia) Broc Parkes	Honda	**3**	20	4	Ret	4	5	4	3	3	5	4	**4**	**27**	135
6	(South Africa) Sheridan Morais	Kawasaki	6	10	15	Ret	6	6	3	7	7	4	Ret	6	14	96
7	(Italy) Alex Baldolini	Triumph	8	11	5	6	12	3	Ret	Ret	8	11	5	8	6	96
8	(South Africa) Ronan Quarmby	Honda	7	3	Ret	Ret	7	Ret	6	6	4	13	9	9	26	84
9	(Italy) Vittorio Iannuzzo	Triumph	9	5	Ret	9	Ret	9	7	9	13	Ret	7	Ret	19	60
10	(Italy) Andrea Antonelli	Honda	16	8	7	8	22									60
10	(Italy) Andrea Antonelli	Yamaha						10	Ret	Ret	9	7	14	13	8	60
11	(Russia) Vladimir Leonov	Yamaha	Ret	6	3	Ret	DNS		Ret	10	18	3	DSQ	12	17	52
12	(Italy) Roberto Tamburini	Honda	Ret	4	9	16	11	4	15	Ret	12	9	Ret	Ret	25	50
13	(Hungary) Gábor Talmácsi	Honda						15	9	12	10	8	6	15	9	44
14	(Australia) Jed Metcher	Yamaha	11	15	Ret	11	13	7	8	Ret	Ret	Ret	15	14	10	40
15	(Italy) Massimo Roccoli	Yamaha	Ret	9	Ret	7	14	Ret					10	11	15	30
15	(Italy) Massimo Roccoli	Honda								Ret						30
16	(South Africa) Mathew Scholtz	Honda	14	DSQ	Ret	Ret	Ret	Ret	Ret	Ret	11	10	Ret	10	7	28
17	(Italy) Lorenzo Lanzi	Honda			1											25
18	(United Kingdom) Dan Linfoot	Kawasaki									Ret	16	Ret	7	3	25
19	(France) Romain Lanusse	Kawasaki	19	13	11	Ret	19	Ret	11	11	14	Ret	11	19	28	25
20	(Hungary) Imre Tóth	Honda	18	Ret	16	4	Ret	13	Ret	19	17	24	20	20	13	19
21	(Italy) Stefano Cruciani	Kawasaki				5		Ret		8						19
22	(Hungary) Balázs Németh	Honda	21	7	Ret	Ret	Ret	12	Ret	17	Ret	20	17	21	12	17
23	(Italy) Luca Marconi	Yamaha	13	14	14	13	20	16	12	15	Ret	15	Ret	Ret		16
24	(Italy) Raffaele De Rosa	Honda				10	Ret	11	13	16	15					15
25	(United States) Josh Day	Kawasaki	12	12	Ret	18	Ret	17	10	Ret	Ret	Ret	DNS			14
26	(France) Florian Marino	Kawasaki								13	19	14	12	16	11	14
27	(Australia) Glen Richards	Triumph					5									11
28	(France) Valentin Debise	Honda			Ret	23	8	Ret	Ret	14	Ret	18		18	Ret	10
29	(Austria) David Linortner	Yamaha					21						8			8
30	(Netherlands) Twan van Poppel	Yamaha			8											8
31	(Australia) Billy McConnell	Triumph					9									7
32	(Netherlands) Stuart Voskamp	Suzuki			10											6
33	(Czech Republic) Lukáš Pešek	Honda	10	18												6
34	(Switzerland) Thomas Caiani	Honda	23	DNQ	12	24	25									4
35	(United States) P. J. Jacobsen	Honda			13											3
36	(Italy) Fabio Menghi	Yamaha	15	Ret	Ret	21	24	Ret	14	21	22	17	Ret	Ret	21	3
37	(Italy) Dino Lombardi	Yamaha	20	Ret	Ret	22	23	14	17	18	20	23				2
37	(Italy) Dino Lombardi	Honda											18	Ret	DNS	2
38	(United Kingdom) Kieran Clarke	Honda				14	17									2
39	(United Kingdom) Luke Mossey	Triumph					15									1
40	(United Kingdom) Martin Jessopp	Honda	17	17	Ret	15	16	19	DNS	23	21	19	19	22	18	1
	(Italy) Cristiano Erbacci	Yamaha		16		Ret									16	0
	(Portugal) Miguel Praia	Honda											16	17	22	0
	(Sweden) Alexander Lundh	Honda									16					0
	(Italy) Roberto Anastasia	Honda				20	Ret	Ret	16							0
	(Italy) Mirko Giansanti	Kawasaki				17										0
	(Russia) Oleg Pozdneev	Yamaha		DNQ	DNQ	DNQ	DNQ	22	18	25	DNQ					0
	(Italy) Ilario Dionisi	Honda				Ret	18									0
	(Russia) Eduard Blokhin	Yamaha		21	DNQ	26	26	Ret	19	24	23	Ret	Ret	Ret	Ret	0
	(Italy) Giovanni Altomonte	Honda				19										0
	(Austria) Yves Polzer	Yamaha	22	19	Ret	25	Ret	21	Ret	Ret		28	24	Ret	29	0
	(Switzerland) Roman Stamm	Suzuki													20	0
	(Austria) Stefan Kerschbaumer	Yamaha								20						0
	(Italy) Alessandro Andreozzi	Honda						20								0
	(Netherlands) Leon Bovee	Yamaha											21			0
	(Russia) Maxime Averkin	Kawasaki										21				0
	(Italy) Danilo Marrancone	Honda									Ret	25	22	24	Ret	0
	(Italy) Federico D'Annunzio	Honda										22				0
	(Italy) Andrea Agnelli	Kawasaki								22						0
	(France) Axel Maurin	Kawasaki												25	23	0
	(Russia) Sergey Vlasov	Yamaha												23		0
	(Germany) Luca Hansen	Honda											23			0
	(Australia) Mitchell Carr	Honda													24	0
	(Switzerland) Robin Mulhauser	Yamaha										26				0
	(Russia) Sergei Krapukhin	Yamaha										27				0
	(Poland) Paweł Szkopek	Honda	Ret	DNS					Ret	Ret						0
	(Poland) Adrian Pasek	Honda												Ret		0
	(Poland) Andrzej Chmielewski	Honda										Ret				0
	(United States) Kenny Noyes	Suzuki									Ret					0
	(Poland) Marek Szkopek	Honda						Ret								0
	(Italy) Alessandro Torcolacci	Honda						Ret								0
	(Czech Republic) David Látr	Honda		Ret												0
	(Czech Republic) Ondřej Ježek	Honda	Ret													0
	(Netherlands) Michael van der Mark	Honda										DNS				0
Pos.	Rider	Bike	AUS (Australia)	ITA (Italy)	NED (Netherlands)	ITA (Italy)	EUR (United Kingdom)	SMR (San Marino)	SPA (Spain)	CZE (Czech Republic)	GBR (United Kingdom)	RUS (Russia)	GER (Germany)	POR (Portugal)	FRA (France)	Pts

Colour	Result
Gold	Winner
Silver	Second place
Bronze	Third place
Green	Points classification
Blue	Non-points classification
Blue	Non-classified finish (NC)
Purple	Retired, not classified (Ret)
Red	Did not qualify (DNQ)
Red	Did not pre-qualify (DNPQ)
Black	Disqualified (DSQ)
White	Did not start (DNS)
White	Withdrew (WD)
White	Race cancelled (C)
Blank	Did not practice (DNP)
Blank	Did not arrive (DNA)
Blank	Excluded (EX)

Bold – Pole position
Italics – Fastest lap

=== Teams' standings ===
Pos.	Teams	Bike No.	AUS (Australia)	ITA (Italy)	NED (Netherlands)	ITA (Italy)	EUR (United Kingdom)	SMR (San Marino)	SPA (Spain)	CZE (Czech Republic)	GBR (United Kingdom)	RUS (Russia)	GER (Germany)	POR (Portugal)	FRA (France)	Pts.
1	(Italy) Kawasaki DeltaFin Lorenzini (Italy) Kawasaki Lorenzini	54	1	DSQ	2	3	2	1	5	**2**	5	1	1	2	4	327
1	(Italy) Kawasaki DeltaFin Lorenzini (Italy) Kawasaki Lorenzini	32	6	10	15	Ret	6	6	3	7	7	4	Ret	6	14	327
2	(United Kingdom) PTR Honda	16	4	Ret	6	1	**3**	2	**Ret**	5	**1**	**2**	**2**	1	1	294
2	(United Kingdom) PTR Honda	34	7	3	Ret	Ret	7	Ret	6	6	4	13	9	9	26	294
3	(United Kingdom) Bodnaka PTR Honda	11	5	**2**	**Ret**	**2**	1	**18**	1	4	2	12	13	5	2	205
3	(United Kingdom) Bodnaka PTR Honda	20	14	DSQ	Ret	Ret	Ret	Ret	Ret	Ret	11	10	Ret	10	7	205
3	(United Kingdom) Bodnaka PTR Honda	9			13											205
3	(United Kingdom) Bodnaka PTR Honda	74				14	17									205
3	(United Kingdom) Bodnaka PTR Honda	5									16					205
3	(United Kingdom) Bodnaka PTR Honda	117											16		22	205
3	(United Kingdom) Bodnaka PTR Honda	19	Ret	DNS					Ret	Ret						205
3	(United Kingdom) Bodnaka PTR Honda	91						Ret								205
3	(United Kingdom) Bodnaka PTR Honda	137										Ret				205
3	(United Kingdom) Bodnaka PTR Honda	7												Ret		205
4	(Italy) Kawasaki Intermoto Step	99	2	1	Ret	12	10	8	2	1	6	6	3	3	5	196
4	(Italy) Kawasaki Intermoto Step	98	19	13	11	Ret	19	Ret	11	11	14	Ret	11	19	28	196
5	(Italy) Power Team by Suriano	25	8	11	5	6	12	3	Ret	Ret	8	11	5	8	6	156
5	(Italy) Power Team by Suriano	31	9	5	Ret	9	Ret	9	7	9	13	Ret	7	Ret	19	156
6	(Netherlands) Ten Kate Racing Products	23	**3**	20	4	Ret	4	5	4	3	3	5	4	**4**	**27**	135
7	(Italy) Team Lorini	22	Ret	4	9	16	11	4	15	Ret	12	9	Ret	Ret	25	84
7	(Italy) Team Lorini	8	16	8	7	8	22									84
7	(Italy) Team Lorini	35						11	13	16	15					84
7	(Italy) Team Lorini	13											18	Ret	DNS	84
7	(Italy) Team Lorini	41										22				84
8	(Czech Republic) PRORACE	14						15	9	12	10	8	6	15	9	75
8	(Czech Republic) PRORACE	57			1											75
8	(Czech Republic) PRORACE	52	10	18												75
8	(Czech Republic) PRORACE	157				Ret	18									75
9	(San Marino) Bike Service – WTR Ten 10 (San Marino) Bike Service R.T	8						10	Ret	Ret	9	7	14	13	8	53
9	(San Marino) Bike Service – WTR Ten 10 (San Marino) Bike Service R.T	55	Ret	9	Ret	7	14									53
10	(Russia) Yakhnich Motorsport	65	Ret	6	3	Ret	DNS		Ret	10	18	3	DSQ	12	17	52
10	(Russia) Yakhnich Motorsport	55						Ret								52
11	(Russia) RivaMoto Junior Team (Russia) RivaMoto	3	11	15	Ret	11	13	7	8	Ret	Ret	Ret	15	14	10	40
11	(Russia) RivaMoto Junior Team (Russia) RivaMoto	73		DNQ	DNQ	DNQ	DNQ	22	18	25	DNQ					40
11	(Russia) RivaMoto Junior Team (Russia) RivaMoto	24		21	DNQ	26	26	Ret	19	24	23	Ret	Ret	Ret	Ret	40
11	(Russia) RivaMoto Junior Team (Russia) RivaMoto	70										26				40
12	(Hungary) Racing Team Tóth	10	18	Ret	16	4	Ret	13	Ret	19	17	24	20	20	13	36
12	(Hungary) Racing Team Tóth	38	21	7	Ret	Ret	Ret	12	Ret	17	Ret	20	17	21	12	36
13	(Italy) VFT Racing	87	13	14	14	13	20	16	12	15	Ret	15	Ret	Ret		19
13	(Italy) VFT Racing	61	15	Ret	Ret	21	24	Ret	14	21	22	17	Ret	Ret	21	19
13	(Italy) VFT Racing	81													16	19
14	(Italy) Team Go Eleven Kawasaki	64	12	12	Ret	18	Ret	17	10	Ret	Ret	Ret	DNS			14
14	(Italy) Team Go Eleven Kawasaki	94												25	23	14
15	(Italy) Team Pata by Martini	55											10	11	15	14
15	(Italy) Team Pata by Martini	13	20	Ret	Ret	22	23	14	17	18	20	23				14
16	(Czech Republic) SMS Racing	53			Ret	23	8	Ret	Ret	14	Ret	18		18	Ret	10
16	(Czech Republic) SMS Racing	15											23			10
16	(Czech Republic) SMS Racing	69	Ret													10
16	(Czech Republic) SMS Racing	18		Ret												10
17	(Italy) Kuja Racing	27	23	DNQ	12	24	25									4
17	(Italy) Kuja Racing	17						Ret	16							4
17	(Italy) Kuja Racing	125									Ret	25	22	24	Ret	4
17	(Italy) Kuja Racing	55								Ret						4
18	(United Kingdom) Riders PTR Honda	40	17	17	Ret	15	16	19	DNS	23	21	19	19	22	18	1
	Team MRC Austria	33	22	19	Ret	25	Ret	21	Ret	Ret		28	24	Ret	29	0
Pos.	Teams	Bike No.	AUS (Australia)	ITA (Italy)	NED (Netherlands)	ITA (Italy)	EUR (United Kingdom)	SMR (San Marino)	SPA (Spain)	CZE (Czech Republic)	GBR (United Kingdom)	RUS (Russia)	GER (Germany)	POR (Portugal)	FRA (France)	Pts.

=== Manufacturers' standings ===
Pos.	Manufacturer	AUS (Australia)	ITA (Italy)	NED (Netherlands)	ITA (Italy)	EUR (United Kingdom)	SMR (San Marino)	SPA (Spain)	CZE (Czech Republic)	GBR (United Kingdom)	RUS (Russia)	GER (Germany)	POR (Portugal)	FRA (France)	Pts
1	(Japan) Honda	3	2	1	1	1	2	1	3	1	2	2	1	1	287
2	(Japan) Kawasaki	1	1	2	3	2	1	2	1	5	1	1	2	3	273
3	(United Kingdom) Triumph	8	5	5	6	5	3	7	9	8	11	5	8	6	125
4	(Japan) Yamaha	11	6	3	7	13	7	8	10	9	3	8	11	8	110
5	(Japan) Suzuki			10						Ret				20	6
Pos.	Manufacturer	AUS (Australia)	ITA (Italy)	NED (Netherlands)	ITA (Italy)	EUR (United Kingdom)	SMR (San Marino)	SPA (Spain)	CZE (Czech Republic)	GBR (United Kingdom)	RUS (Russia)	GER (Germany)	POR (Portugal)	FRA (France)	Pts

== Entry list ==
- A provisional entry list was released by the Fédération Internationale de Motocyclisme on 18 January 2012.

2012 entry list
Team	Constructor	Motorcycle	No.	Rider	Rounds
Benjan Racing	Honda	Honda CBR600RR	36	(Australia) Mitchell Carr	13
Bogdanka Honda PTR	Honda	Honda CBR600RR	5	(Sweden) Alexander Lundh	9
Bogdanka Honda PTR	Honda	Honda CBR600RR	7	(Poland) Adrian Pasek	12
Bogdanka Honda PTR	Honda	Honda CBR600RR	9	(United States) P. J. Jacobsen	3
Bogdanka Honda PTR	Honda	Honda CBR600RR	19	(Poland) Paweł Szkopek	1–2, 7–8
Bogdanka Honda PTR	Honda	Honda CBR600RR	74	(United Kingdom) Kieran Clarke	4–5
Bogdanka Honda PTR	Honda	Honda CBR600RR	91	(Poland) Marek Szkopek	6
Bogdanka Honda PTR	Honda	Honda CBR600RR	117	(Portugal) Miguel Praia	11, 13
Bogdanka Honda PTR	Honda	Honda CBR600RR	137	(Poland) Andrzej Chmielewski	10
Bogdanka PTR Honda	Honda	Honda CBR600RR	11	(United Kingdom) Sam Lowes	All
Bogdanka PTR Honda	Honda	Honda CBR600RR	20	(South Africa) Mathew Scholtz	All
Kuja Racing	Honda	Honda CBR600RR	17	(Italy) Roberto Anastasia	4–5
Kuja Racing	Honda	Honda CBR600RR	17	(Italy) Roberto Anastasia	6–7
Kuja Racing	Honda	Honda CBR600RR	27	(Switzerland) Thomas Caiani	1–5
Kuja Racing	Honda	Honda CBR600RR	44	(Italy) Alessandro Torcolacci	6
Kuja Racing	Honda	Honda CBR600RR	55	(Italy) Massimo Roccoli	8
Kuja Racing	Honda	Honda CBR600RR	88	(Italy) Giovanni Altomonte	4
Kuja Racing	Honda	Honda CBR600RR	125	(Italy) Danilo Marrancone	9–13
PRORACE	Honda	Honda CBR600RR	14	(Hungary) Gábor Talmácsi	6–13
PRORACE	Honda	Honda CBR600RR	52	(Czech Republic) Lukáš Pešek	1–2
PRORACE	Honda	Honda CBR600RR	57	(Italy) Lorenzo Lanzi	3
PRORACE	Honda	Honda CBR600RR	157	(Italy) Ilario Dionisi	4–5
PTR Honda	Honda	Honda CBR600RR	16	(France) Jules Cluzel	All
PTR Honda	Honda	Honda CBR600RR	34	(South Africa) Ronan Quarmby	All
Racing Team Tóth	Honda	Honda CBR600RR	10	(Hungary) Imre Tóth	All
Racing Team Tóth	Honda	Honda CBR600RR	38	(Hungary) Balázs Németh	All
Riders PTR Honda	Honda	Honda CBR600RR	40	(United Kingdom) Martin Jessopp	All
SMS Racing	Honda	Honda CBR600RR	15	(Germany) Luca Hansen	11
SMS Racing	Honda	Honda CBR600RR	18	(Czech Republic) David Látr	2
SMS Racing	Honda	Honda CBR600RR	53	(France) Valentin Debise	3–10, 12–13
SMS Racing	Honda	Honda CBR600RR	69	(Czech Republic) Ondřej Ježek	1
Team Lorini	Honda	Honda CBR600RR	8	(Italy) Andrea Antonelli	1–5
Team Lorini	Honda	Honda CBR600RR	13	(Italy) Dino Lombardi	11–13
Team Lorini	Honda	Honda CBR600RR	22	(Italy) Roberto Tamburini	All
Team Lorini	Honda	Honda CBR600RR	35	(Italy) Raffaele De Rosa	4–5
Team Lorini	Honda	Honda CBR600RR	35	(Italy) Raffaele De Rosa	6–9
Team Lorini	Honda	Honda CBR600RR	41	(Italy) Federico D'Annunzio	10
Ten Kate Racing Products	Honda	Honda CBR600RR	23	(Australia) Broc Parkes	All
Ten Kate Racing Products	Honda	Honda CBR600RR	60	(Netherlands) Michael van der Mark	10
Ten Kate Racing Products	Honda	Honda CBR600RR	117	(Portugal) Miguel Praia	12
HELL Racing Team	Kawasaki	Kawasaki Ninja ZX-6R	79	(Russia) Maxim Averkin	10
Kawasaki DeltaFin Lorenzini; Kawasaki Lorenzini	Kawasaki	Kawasaki Ninja ZX-6R	32	(South Africa) Sheridan Morais	All
Kawasaki DeltaFin Lorenzini; Kawasaki Lorenzini	Kawasaki	Kawasaki Ninja ZX-6R	54	(Turkey) Kenan Sofuoğlu	All
Kawasaki Intermoto Step	Kawasaki	Kawasaki Ninja ZX-6R	98	(France) Romain Lanusse	All
Kawasaki Intermoto Step	Kawasaki	Kawasaki Ninja ZX-6R	99	(France) Fabien Foret	All
MSD R-N Racing Team India	Kawasaki	Kawasaki Ninja ZX-6R	4	(United Kingdom) Dan Linfoot	9–13
MSD R-N Racing Team India	Kawasaki	Kawasaki Ninja ZX-6R	93	(France) Florian Marino	8–13
Puccetti Racing Kawasaki Italia	Kawasaki	Kawasaki Ninja ZX-6R	6	(Italy) Mirko Giansanti	4
Puccetti Racing Kawasaki Italia	Kawasaki	Kawasaki Ninja ZX-6R	12	(Italy) Stefano Cruciani	4, 6, 8
Puccetti Racing Kawasaki Italia	Kawasaki	Kawasaki Ninja ZX-6R	66	(Italy) Andrea Agnelli	8
Team Go Eleven Kawasaki	Kawasaki	Kawasaki Ninja ZX-6R	64	(United States) Josh Day	1–11
Team Go Eleven Kawasaki	Kawasaki	Kawasaki Ninja ZX-6R	94	(France) Axel Maurin	12–13
Konvi Racing Team	Suzuki	Suzuki GSX-R600	77	(Netherlands) Stuart Voskamp	3
Team Suzuki Mayer	Suzuki	Suzuki GSX-R600	76	(Switzerland) Roman Stamm	13
WKbikes Hampshire Motorcycles	Suzuki	Suzuki GSX-R600	49	(United States) Kenny Noyes	9
Power Team by Suriano	Triumph	Triumph Daytona 675	25	(Italy) Alex Baldolini	All
Power Team by Suriano	Triumph	Triumph Daytona 675	31	(Italy) Vittorio Iannuzzo	All
Smiths Gloucester	Triumph	Triumph Daytona 675	30	(Australia) Billy McConnell	5
Smiths Gloucester	Triumph	Triumph Daytona 675	45	(Australia) Glen Richards	5
Smiths Gloucester	Triumph	Triumph Daytona 675	112	(United Kingdom) Luke Mossey	5
Bike Service – WTR TEN 10; Bike Service R.T.	Yamaha	Yamaha YZF-R6	8	(Italy) Andrea Antonelli	6–13
Bike Service – WTR TEN 10; Bike Service R.T.	Yamaha	Yamaha YZF-R6	21	(Italy) Alessandro Andreozzi	6
Bike Service – WTR TEN 10; Bike Service R.T.	Yamaha	Yamaha YZF-R6	55	(Italy) Massimo Roccoli	1–5
Bike Service – WTR TEN 10; Bike Service R.T.	Yamaha	Yamaha YZF-R6	81	(Italy) Cristiano Erbacci	2, 4
DMC Racing	Yamaha	Yamaha YZF-R6	50	(Russia) Sergei Krapukhin	10
DTC Racing Team	Yamaha	Yamaha YZF-R6	2	(Netherlands) Leon Bovee	11
Gerin-Skm Racing Team	Yamaha	Yamaha YZF-R6	37	(Austria) David Linortner	5, 11
Kerschbaumer Team	Yamaha	Yamaha YZF-R6	89	(Austria) Stefan Kerschbaumer	8
RivaMoto Junior Team; RivaMoto	Yamaha	Yamaha YZF-R6	3	(Australia) Jed Metcher	All
RivaMoto Junior Team; RivaMoto	Yamaha	Yamaha YZF-R6	24	(Russia) Eduard Blokhin	2–13
RivaMoto Junior Team; RivaMoto	Yamaha	Yamaha YZF-R6	70	(Switzerland) Robin Mulhauser	10
RivaMoto Junior Team; RivaMoto	Yamaha	Yamaha YZF-R6	73	(Russia) Oleg Pozdneev	2–9
Team MRC Austria	Yamaha	Yamaha YZF-R6	33	(Austria) Yves Polzer	1–8, 10–13
Team PATA by Martini	Yamaha	Yamaha YZF-R6	13	(Italy) Dino Lombardi	1–10
Team PATA by Martini	Yamaha	Yamaha YZF-R6	55	(Italy) Massimo Roccoli	11–13
TRG Motorsport	Yamaha	Yamaha YZF-R6	26	(Netherlands) Twan van Poppel	3
VFT Racing	Yamaha	Yamaha YZF-R6	61	(Italy) Fabio Menghi	All
VFT Racing	Yamaha	Yamaha YZF-R6	81	(Italy) Cristiano Erbacci	13
VFT Racing	Yamaha	Yamaha YZF-R6	87	(Italy) Luca Marconi	1–12
Yakhnich Motorsport	Yamaha	Yamaha YZF-R6	55	(Italy) Massimo Roccoli	6
Yakhnich Motorsport	Yamaha	Yamaha YZF-R6	65	(Russia) Vladimir Leonov	1–5, 7–13
Yakhnich Motorsport	Yamaha	Yamaha YZF-R6	78	(Russia) Sergey Vlasov	12

Key
Regular rider
Wildcard rider
Replacement rider

- All entries used Pirelli tyres.
