= Luca Marconi =

Italian motorcycle racer

- Nationality: Italian
- Born: 13 July 1989 (age 37); Rimini, Italy
Motorcycle racing career statistics
125cc World Championship
Active years	2009–2010
Manufacturers	Aprilia
Starts / Wins / Podiums / Poles / F. laps / Points; 30 / 0 / 0 / 0 / 0 / 0
Supersport World Championship
Active years	2011–2014
Manufacturers	Yamaha, Honda
Starts / Wins / Podiums / Poles / F. laps / Points; 36 / 0 / 0 / 0 / 0 / 41

Luca Marconi (born 13 July 1989) is an Italian former motorcycle racer who last rode a Yamaha YZF-R1 in the European Superstock 1000 Championship and the Endurance FIM World Cup. He has competed in the 125cc World Championship and the Supersport World Championship. Marconi is also the 2006 and 2007 European Minibike Championship.

== Career statistics ==
=== Career highlights ===
- 2015 - 17th, FIM Superstock 1000 Cup, Yamaha YZF-R1
- 2016 - 23rd, FIM Superstock 1000 Cup, Yamaha YZF-R1
- 2017 - 22nd, European Superstock 1000 Championship, Yamaha YZF-R1

=== Grand Prix motorcycle racing ===
==== By season ====
Season	Class	Motorcycle	Team	Race	Win	Podium	Pole	FLap	Pts	Plcd
2009	125cc	Aprilia	CBC Corse	16	0	0	0	0	0	NC
2010	125cc	Aprilia	Ongetta Team	14	0	0	0	0	0	NC
Total				**30**	**0**	**0**	**0**	**0**	**0**	

==== Races by year ====
(key) (Races in bold indicate pole position)

Year	Class	Bike	1	2	3	4	5	6	7	8	9	10	11	12	13	14	15	16	17	Pos.	Pts
2009	125cc	Aprilia	QAT; 24	JPN; 25	SPA; 25	FRA; Ret	ITA; Ret	CAT; 24	NED; 23	GER; 24	GBR; 19	CZE; 26	INP; 24	RSM; 24	POR; 26	AUS; Ret	MAL; 21	VAL; Ret		NC	0
2010	125cc	Aprilia	QAT; 22	SPA; 17	FRA	ITA; Ret	GBR; 23	NED; Ret	CAT; 18	GER; Ret	CZE; 23	INP; 18	RSM; Ret	ARA	JPN; 23	MAL; Ret	AUS; 19	POR; Ret	VAL	NC	0

=== Supersport World Championship ===
==== By season ====
Season	Motorcycle	Race	Win	Podium	Pole	FLap	Pts	Plcd
2011	Yamaha	9	0	0	0	0	3	31st
2012	Yamaha	12	0	0	0	0	16	23rd
2013	Honda	10	0	0	0	0	17	22nd
2014	Honda	5	0	0	0	0	5	26th
Total		**36**	**0**	**0**	**0**	**0**	**41**	

==== Races by year ====
Year	Bike	1	2	3	4	5	6	7	8	9	10	11	12	13	Pos.	Pts
2011	Yamaha	AUS; 19	EUR; Ret	NED; Ret	ITA; 15	SMR; Ret	SPA; Ret	CZE; 14	GBR; Ret	GER; DNS	ITA	FRA	POR; 17		31st	3
2012	Yamaha	AUS; 13	ITA; 14	NED; 14	ITA; 13	EUR; 20	SMR; 16	SPA; 12	CZE; 15	GBR; Ret	RUS; 15	GER; Ret	POR; Ret	FRA	23rd	16
2013	Honda	AUS; 12	SPA; 10	NED; DNS	ITA; 10	GBR; 18	POR; 15	ITA; DNS	RUS	GBR; 20	GER; 22	TUR; 20	FRA; 18	SPA; 19	22nd	17
2014	Honda	AUS	SPA	NED	ITA	GBR	MAL	SMR; 21	POR; 16	SPA; Ret	FRA; 11	QAT; Ret			26th	5

=== Superstock 1000 Cup ===
==== Races by year ====
(key) (Races in bold indicate pole position) (Races in italics indicate fastest lap)

Year	Bike	1	2	3	4	5	6	7	8	Pos	Pts
2015	Yamaha	ARA	NED	IMO; 16	DON; 14	ALG; 9	MIS; 11	JER; 14	MAG	17th	16
2016	Yamaha	ARA; 8	NED; Ret	IMO; Ret	DON; Ret	MIS; 14	LAU	MAG	JER	23rd	10

=== European Superstock 1000 Championship ===
==== Races by year ====
(key) (Races in bold indicate pole position) (Races in italics indicate fastest lap)

Year	Bike	1	2	3	4	5	6	7	8	9	Pos	Pts
2017	Yamaha	ARA; 12	NED; 12	IMO; Ret	DON	MIS	LAU	ALG	MAG	JER	22nd	8
