= Balázs Németh =

Hungarian motorcycle racer

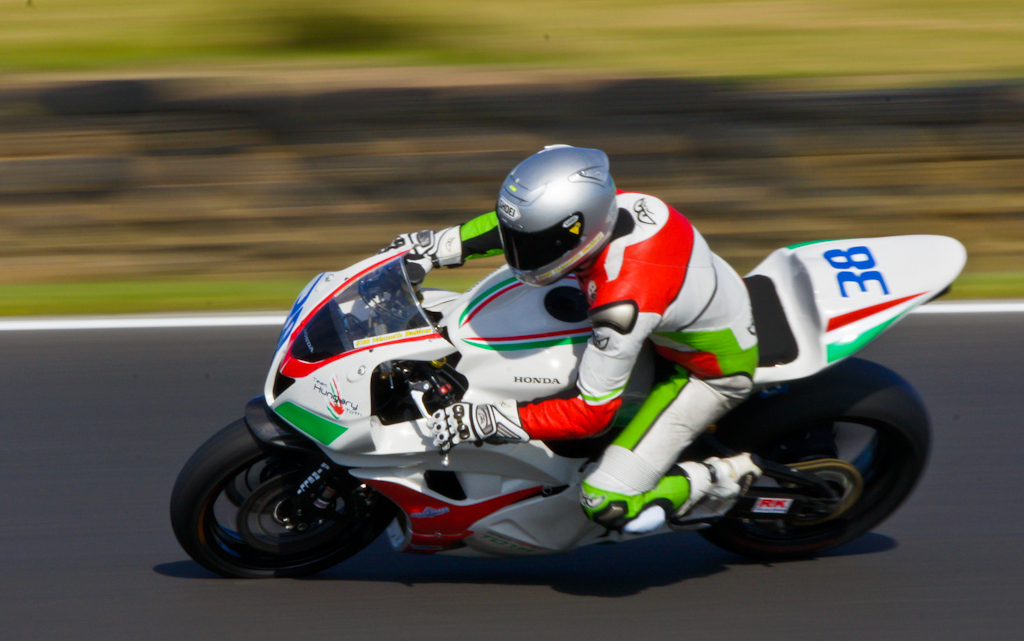
- Németh in 2011
- Nationality: Hungarian
- Born: 12 June 1988 (age 38); Budapest, Hungary
- Current team: Czech Road Racing Team
- Bike number: 134

Balázs Németh (born 12 June 1988, in Budapest) is a Hungarian motorcycle racer. He currently races in the Alpe Adria Road Racing Supersport Championship aboard a Triumph Daytona 675.

== Career ==
=== Early career ===
Németh began his career at the age of six, with minimotos. He raced until 2005 in various categories, and he was multiple Hungarian champion.

=== Superstock and Supersport ===
Németh's debut in the Superstock 600 championship was in 2005. In his second race, in the Hungarian championship, he was in the podium, and in a race in the Hungaroring, he was in the podium, but now in the international championship.

From 2006, Németh competed in the Superstock 1000 category. He spent there three years, and in this time, he achieved two victories and another two podium finishes. His best overall position was fourth. In this year, he was the best young Hungarian motorcycle racer.

In 2008, Németh competed in eight races in the Supersport championship, but he failed to score points despite finishing in all races. His best position was 16th.

=== 250cc ===
After Gábor Talmácsi left Balatonring Team because of financial reasons and the scarcity of his second bike, Jorge Martínez wanted another Hungarian motorcycle racer, and signed Németh just before the Italian race. He scored his first point in the Czech Grand Prix, he finished in the 14th position. He was 23rd overall with 11 points.

== Career statistics ==
=== Career highlights ===
- 2007 - 30th, FIM Superstock 1000 Cup, Suzuki GSX-R1000
- 2009 - NC, FIM Superstock 1000 Cup, Honda
- 2014 - 12th, FIM Superstock 1000 Cup, Kawasaki ZX-10R
- 2015 - NC, FIM Superstock 1000 Cup, Kawasaki ZX-10R

=== FIM Superstock 1000 Cup ===
==== Races by year ====
(key) (Races in bold indicate pole position) (Races in italics indicate fastest lap)

Year	Bike	1	2	3	4	5	6	7	8	9	10	11	Pos	Pts
2007	Suzuki	DON; Ret	VAL; 17	NED; 18	MNZ; 25	SIL; 22	SMR; 29	BRN; 13	BRA; 18	LAU; 18	ITA; 15	MAG; 17	30th	4
2009	Honda	VAL; Ret	NED; 25	MNZ	SMR	DON	BRN	NŰR	IMO	MAG	ALG		NC	0
2014	Kawasaki	ARA; Ret	NED; 9	IMO; 6	MIS; 11	ALG; 10	JER; Ret	MAG					12th	21
2015	Kawasaki	ARA; DNS	NED	IMO	DON	ALG	MIS	JER	MAG				NC	0

=== Grand Prix motorcycle racing ===
==== By season ====
Season	Class	Motorcycle	Team	Number	Race	Win	Podium	Pole	FLap	Pts	Plcd
2009	250cc	Aprilia	Balatonring Team	11	10	0	0	0	0	11	23rd
Total					**10**	**0**	**0**	**0**	**0**	**11**	

==== Races by year ====
Year	Class	Bike	1	2	3	4	5	6	7	8	9	10	11	12	13	14	15	16	Pos.	Pts
2009	250cc	Aprilia	QAT	JPN	SPA	FRA	ITA; 16	CAT; 18	NED	GER	GBR; Ret	CZE; 14	INP; 16	SMR; 15	POR; 16	AUS; 16	MAL; 11	VAL; 13	23rd	11

=== Supersport World Championship ===
==== Races by year ====
Year	Bike	1	2	3	4	5	6	7	8	9	10	11	12	13	Pos.	Pts
2008	Honda	QAT	AUS	SPA	NED	ITA	GER; 16	SMR; 26	CZE; 19	GBR; 23	EUR; 21	ITA; 25	FRA; 19	POR; 19	NC	0
2011	Honda	AUS; 14	EUR; 14	NED; 10	ITA; 14	SMR; 18	SPA; 12	CZE	GBR; 7	GER; 10	ITA; Ret	FRA; 11	POR; 10		15th	42
2012	Honda	AUS; 21	ITA; 7	NED; Ret	ITA; Ret	EUR; Ret	SMR; 12	SPA; Ret	CZE; 17	GBR; Ret	RUS; 20	GER; 17	POR; 21	FRA; 12	22nd	17
2013	Honda	AUS; DNS	SPA; 16	NED; Ret	ITA; 22	GBR; 22	POR; Ret	ITA; 16	RUS; C	GBR; Ret	GER; Ret	TUR; Ret	FRA; 20	SPA	NC	0
