= 2012 Phillip Island Superbike World Championship round =

(Australia) 2012 Phillip Island Superbike World Championship round
Round details
- Round 1 of 14 rounds in the 2012 Superbike World Championship. and Round 1 of 13 rounds in the 2012 Supersport World Championship.
- Date: 26 February, 2012
- Location: Phillip Island
- Course: Permanent racing facility 4.445 km (2.762 mi)

Superbike World Championship
Pole position
(United Kingdom) Tom Sykes
1:31.323 (Combined sessions); Superpole cancelled when circuit closed following investigation into fatal crash during support race.
Fastest lap race 1	Fastest lap race 2
(Italy) Max Biaggi	(Spain) Carlos Checa
1:31.785	1:32.846

Supersport World Championship
Pole position
(Australia) Broc Parkes
1:34.445
Fastest lap
(France) Fabien Foret
1:35.274

The 2012 Phillip Island Superbike World Championship round was the first round of the 2012 Superbike World Championship season and of the 2012 Supersport World Championship season. It took place over the weekend of 24–26 February 2012 at the Phillip Island Grand Prix Circuit near Cowes, Victoria, Australia.

== Superbike ==
Crescent Suzuki's John Hopkins and Team Pedercini's Leandro Mercado, both injured, were replaced by Josh Brookes and Bryan Staring.

During Saturday sessions, a crash in the domestic Supersport race killed Oscar McIntyre, 17, and the circuit was closed for investigation following the fatal crash. The incident forced officials to call off Superpole qualifying, as the investigation curtailed all events at the circuit for the day. The starting grid for both races was then established from the two qualifying sessions.

Max Biaggi won the first race with 7.104 secs advantage over Marco Melandri while Carlos Checa lost the rear tire when he was accelerating into the main straight of the circuit. In terms of top speed, both Biaggi and Melandri recorded the highest top speeds of 324.6 and 322.7 km/h respectively. Melandri's result represented the first ever second position for BMW at a superbike race. Phillip Island second race was full of drama when Biaggi went off the track and re-joined in the last position. He remounted all the way to finish second at just +5.707 secs from race winner Checa.

=== Race 1 classification ===
Pos	No.	Rider	Bike	Laps	Time	Grid	Points
1	3	(Italy) Max Biaggi	Aprilia RSV4 Factory	22	34:13.963	2	25
2	33	(Italy) Marco Melandri	BMW S1000RR	22	+7.104	13	20
3	50	(France) Sylvain Guintoli	Ducati 1098R	22	+7.378	5	16
4	66	(United Kingdom) Tom Sykes	Kawasaki ZX-10R	22	+12.189	1	13
5	96	(Czech Republic) Jakub Smrž	Ducati 1098R	22	+16.424	4	11
6	84	(Italy) Michel Fabrizio	BMW S1000RR	22	+20.200	10	10
7	65	(United Kingdom) Jonathan Rea	Honda CBR1000RR	22	+20.223	8	9
8	4	(Japan) Hiroshi Aoyama	Honda CBR1000RR	22	+24.108	16	8
9	34	(Italy) Davide Giugliano	Ducati 1098R	22	+28.072	14	7
10	67	(Australia) Bryan Staring	Kawasaki ZX-10R	22	+34.232	17	6
11	87	(Italy) Lorenzo Zanetti	Ducati 1098R	22	+34.450	20	5
12	91	(United Kingdom) Leon Haslam	BMW S1000RR	22	+35.648	12	4
13	121	(France) Maxime Berger	Ducati 1098R	22	+36.392	9	3
14	44	(Spain) David Salom	Kawasaki ZX-10R	22	+41.500	18	2
15	17	(Spain) Joan Lascorz	Kawasaki ZX-10R	22	+42.086	15	1
16	25	(Australia) Josh Brookes	Suzuki GSX-R1000	22	+42.605	21	
17	2	(United Kingdom) Leon Camier	Suzuki GSX-R1000	22	+43.366	6	
18	18	(Australia) Mark Aitchison	BMW S1000RR	22	+45.225	22	
19	20	(Australia) David Johnson	BMW S1000RR	22	+1:08.782	24	
20	59	(Italy) Niccolò Canepa	Ducati 1098R	22	+1:10.440	7	
Ret	58	(Republic of Ireland) Eugene Laverty	Aprilia RSV4 Factory	19	Retirement	11	
Ret	86	(Italy) Ayrton Badovini	BMW S1000RR	14	Retirement	19	
Ret	7	(Spain) Carlos Checa	Ducati 1098R	5	Accident	3	
Ret	35	(Italy) Raffaele De Rosa	Honda CBR1000RR	0	Retirement	23	
DNS	19	(United Kingdom) Chaz Davies	Aprilia RSV4 Factory		Injured		
OFFICIAL SUPERBIKE RACE 1 REPORT

=== Race 2 classification ===
Pos	No.	Rider	Bike	Laps	Time	Grid	Points
1	7	(Spain) Carlos Checa	Ducati 1098R	22	34:26.728	3	25
2	3	(Italy) Max Biaggi	Aprilia RSV4 Factory	22	+5.707	2	20
3	66	(United Kingdom) Tom Sykes	Kawasaki ZX-10R	22	+12.521	1	16
4	65	(United Kingdom) Jonathan Rea	Honda CBR1000RR	22	+12.655	8	13
5	91	(United Kingdom) Leon Haslam	BMW S1000RR	22	+18.179	12	11
6	33	(Italy) Marco Melandri	BMW S1000RR	22	+18.831	13	10
7	121	(France) Maxime Berger	Ducati 1098R	22	+18.939	9	9
8	58	(Republic of Ireland) Eugene Laverty	Aprilia RSV4 Factory	22	+19.478	11	8
9	4	(Japan) Hiroshi Aoyama	Honda CBR1000RR	22	+19.554	16	7
10	59	(Italy) Niccolò Canepa	Ducati 1098R	22	+26.289	7	6
11	96	(Czech Republic) Jakub Smrž	Ducati 1098R	22	+26.479	4	5
12	2	(United Kingdom) Leon Camier	Suzuki GSX-R1000	22	+29.145	6	4
13	34	(Italy) Davide Giugliano	Ducati 1098R	22	+36.482	14	3
14	87	(Italy) Lorenzo Zanetti	Ducati 1098R	22	+38.113	20	2
15	25	(Australia) Josh Brookes	Suzuki GSX-R1000	22	+43.234	21	1
16	67	(Australia) Bryan Staring	Kawasaki ZX-10R	22	+43.526	17	
17	35	(Italy) Raffaele De Rosa	Honda CBR1000RR	22	+53.929	23	
Ret	86	(Italy) Ayrton Badovini	BMW S1000RR	11	Retirement	19	
Ret	17	(Spain) Joan Lascorz	Kawasaki ZX-10R	10	Accident	15	
Ret	50	(France) Sylvain Guintoli	Ducati 1098R	9	Retirement	5	
Ret	44	(Spain) David Salom	Kawasaki ZX-10R	8	Retirement	18	
Ret	84	(Italy) Michel Fabrizio	BMW S1000RR	4	Retirement	10	
Ret	20	(Australia) David Johnson	BMW S1000RR	4	Retirement	24	
Ret	18	(Australia) Mark Aitchison	BMW S1000RR	1	Accident	22	
DNS	19	(United Kingdom) Chaz Davies	Aprilia RSV4 Factory		Injured		
OFFICIAL SUPERBIKE RACE 2 REPORT

== Supersport ==
=== Race classification ===
Pos	No.	Rider	Bike	Laps	Time	Grid	Points
1	54	(Turkey) Kenan Sofuoğlu	Kawasaki ZX-6R	15	24:08.130	4	25
2	99	(France) Fabien Foret	Kawasaki ZX-6R	15	+0.078	5	20
3	23	(Australia) Broc Parkes	Honda CBR600RR	15	+2.038	1	16
4	16	(France) Jules Cluzel	Honda CBR600RR	15	+2.113	3	13
5	11	(United Kingdom) Sam Lowes	Honda CBR600RR	15	+4.955	2	11
6	32	(South Africa) Sheridan Morais	Kawasaki ZX-6R	15	+6.812	6	10
7	34	(South Africa) Ronan Quarmby	Honda CBR600RR	15	+11.592	13	9
8	25	(Italy) Alex Baldolini	Triumph Daytona 675	15	+16.761	7	8
9	31	(Italy) Vittorio Iannuzzo	Triumph Daytona 675	15	+18.098	14	7
10	52	(Czech Republic) Lukáš Pešek	Honda CBR600RR	15	+18.425	12	6
11	3	(Australia) Jed Metcher	Yamaha YZF-R6	15	+19.227	17	5
12	64	(United States) Joshua Day	Kawasaki ZX-6R	15	+24.412	19	4
13	87	(Italy) Luca Marconi	Yamaha YZF-R6	15	+28.808	23	3
14	20	(South Africa) Mathew Scholtz	Honda CBR600RR	15	+28.915	15	2
15	61	(Italy) Fabio Menghi	Yamaha YZF-R6	15	+29.128	18	1
16	8	(Italy) Andrea Antonelli	Honda CBR600RR	15	+31.719	24	
17	40	(United Kingdom) Martin Jessopp	Honda CBR600RR	15	+36.812	22	
18	10	(Hungary) Imre Tóth	Honda CBR600RR	15	+40.102	20	
19	98	(France) Romain Lanusse	Kawasaki ZX-6R	15	+40.788	26	
20	13	(Italy) Dino Lombardi	Yamaha YZF-R6	15	+44.040	25	
21	38	(Hungary) Balázs Németh	Honda CBR600RR	15	+48.573	8	
22	33	(Austria) Yves Polzer	Yamaha YZF-R6	15	+1:05.387	27	
23	27	(Switzerland) Thomas Caiani	Honda CBR600RR	15	+1:20.489	28	
Ret	69	(Czech Republic) Ondřej Ježek	Honda CBR600RR	12	Retirement	16	
Ret	22	(Italy) Roberto Tamburini	Honda CBR600RR	7	Retirement	9	
Ret	55	(Italy) Massimo Roccoli	Yamaha YZF-R6	3	Retirement	11	
Ret	19	(Poland) Paweł Szkopek	Honda CBR600RR	0	Retirement	10	
Ret	65	(Russia) Vladimir Leonov	Yamaha YZF-R6	0	Retirement	21	
OFFICIAL SUPERSPORT RACE REPORT
