= 2012 Donington Superbike World Championship round =

(United Kingdom) Donington Superbike World Championship round
Round details
- Round 5 of 14 rounds in the Superbike World Championship. and Round 5 of 13 rounds in the Supersport World Championship.
- Date: 11-13 May 2012
- Location: Donington Park
- Course: Permanent racing facility 4.023 km (2.500 mi)

Superbike World Championship
Pole position
(United Kingdom) Tom Sykes
1:27.716
Fastest lap race 1	Fastest lap race 2
(Italy) Max Biaggi	(Italy) Max Biaggi
1:48.867	1:28.995

Supersport World Championship
Pole position
(France) Jules Cluzel
1:30.931
Fastest lap
(United Kingdom) Sam Lowes
1:31.097

The 2012 Donington Superbike World Championship round was the fifth round of both the 2012 Superbike World Championship season and the 2012 Supersport World Championship season. It took place on the weekend of 11–13 May 2012 at Donington Park in North West Leicestershire, England.

== Superbike ==
=== Race 1 classification ===
Pos	No.	Rider	Bike	Laps	Time	Grid	Points
1	33	(Italy) Marco Melandri	BMW S1000RR	23	34:26.736	3	25
2	91	(United Kingdom) Leon Haslam	BMW S1000RR	23	+0.728	2	20
3	66	(United Kingdom) Tom Sykes	Kawasaki ZX-10R	23	+1.609	1	16
4	65	(United Kingdom) Jonathan Rea	Honda CBR1000RR	23	+1.819	6	13
5	3	(Italy) Max Biaggi	Aprilia RSV4 Factory	23	+2.102	4	11
6	7	(Spain) Carlos Checa	Ducati 1098R	23	+4.820	9	10
7	34	(Italy) Davide Giugliano	Ducati 1098R	23	+7.520	13	9
8	50	(France) Sylvain Guintoli	Ducati 1098R	23	+7.927	5	8
9	2	(United Kingdom) Leon Camier	Suzuki GSX-R1000	23	+15.144	7	7
10	84	(Italy) Michel Fabrizio	BMW S1000RR	23	+16.065	11	6
11	86	(Italy) Ayrton Badovini	BMW S1000RR	23	+19.805	10	5
12	19	(United Kingdom) Chaz Davies	Aprilia RSV4 Factory	23	+20.170	16	4
13	121	(France) Maxime Berger	Ducati 1098R	23	+21.274	15	3
14	96	(Czech Republic) Jakub Smrž	Ducati 1098R	23	+21.517	8	2
15	58	(Republic of Ireland) Eugene Laverty	Aprilia RSV4 Factory	23	+26.920	12	1
16	76	(France) Loris Baz	Kawasaki ZX-10R	23	+35.025	18	
17	4	(Japan) Hiroshi Aoyama	Honda CBR1000RR	23	+39.193	17	
18	87	(Italy) Lorenzo Zanetti	Ducati 1098R	23	+42.334	20	
19	59	(Italy) Niccolò Canepa	Ducati 1098R	23	+43.554	14	
NC	18	(Australia) Mark Aitchison	BMW S1000RR	21	+2 laps	21	
NC	60	(United Kingdom) Peter Hickman	Suzuki GSX-R1000	15	+8 laps	19	
Ret	101	(United Kingdom) Gary Mason	Kawasaki ZX-10R	14	Retirement	23	
Ret	36	(Argentina) Leandro Mercado	Kawasaki ZX-10R	0	Accident	22	
OFFICIAL SUPERBIKE RACE 1 REPORT

=== Race 2 classification ===
Pos	No.	Rider	Bike	Laps	Time	Grid	Points
1	65	(United Kingdom) Jonathan Rea	Honda CBR1000RR	23	34:31.847	6	25
2	3	(Italy) Max Biaggi	Aprilia RSV4 Factory	23	+0.508	4	20
3	66	(United Kingdom) Tom Sykes	Kawasaki ZX-10R	23	+2.029	1	16
4	2	(United Kingdom) Leon Camier	Suzuki GSX-R1000	23	+4.245	7	13
5	50	(France) Sylvain Guintoli	Ducati 1098R	23	+6.595	5	11
6	86	(Italy) Ayrton Badovini	BMW S1000RR	23	+17.469	10	10
7	19	(United Kingdom) Chaz Davies	Aprilia RSV4 Factory	23	+17.788	16	9
8	76	(France) Loris Baz	Kawasaki ZX-10R	23	+21.093	18	8
9	60	(United Kingdom) Peter Hickman	Suzuki GSX-R1000	23	+21.866	19	7
10	4	(Japan) Hiroshi Aoyama	Honda CBR1000RR	23	+22.620	17	6
11	59	(Italy) Niccolò Canepa	Ducati 1098R	23	+26.764	14	5
12	87	(Italy) Lorenzo Zanetti	Ducati 1098R	23	+27.043	20	4
13	84	(Italy) Michel Fabrizio	BMW S1000RR	23	+28.390	11	3
14	18	(Australia) Mark Aitchison	BMW S1000RR	23	+56.618	21	2
15	91	(United Kingdom) Leon Haslam	BMW S1000RR	23	+1:20.196	2	1
Ret	33	(Italy) Marco Melandri	BMW S1000RR	22	Accident	3	
Ret	36	(Argentina) Leandro Mercado	Kawasaki ZX-10R	19	Retirement	22	
Ret	101	(United Kingdom) Gary Mason	Kawasaki ZX-10R	14	Retirement	23	
Ret	121	(France) Maxime Berger	Ducati 1098R	12	Retirement	15	
Ret	34	(Italy) Davide Giugliano	Ducati 1098R	11	Retirement	13	
Ret	58	(Republic of Ireland) Eugene Laverty	Aprilia RSV4 Factory	10	Accident	12	
Ret	7	(Spain) Carlos Checa	Ducati 1098R	0	Accident	9	
Ret	96	(Czech Republic) Jakub Smrž	Ducati 1098R	0	Accident	8	
OFFICIAL SUPERBIKE RACE 2 REPORT

== Supersport ==
=== Race classification ===
Pos	No.	Rider	Bike	Laps	Time	Grid	Points
1	11	(United Kingdom) Sam Lowes	Honda CBR600RR	22	33:43.603	2	25
2	54	(Turkey) Kenan Sofuoğlu	Kawasaki ZX-6R	22	+0.678	4	20
3	16	(France) Jules Cluzel	Honda CBR600RR	22	+3.987	1	16
4	23	(Australia) Broc Parkes	Honda CBR600RR	22	+8.088	3	13
5	45	(Australia) Glen Richards	Triumph Daytona 675	22	+11.786	5	11
6	32	(South Africa) Sheridan Morais	Kawasaki ZX-6R	22	+20.849	6	10
7	34	(South Africa) Ronan Quarmby	Honda CBR600RR	22	+23.795	11	9
8	53	(France) Valentin Debise	Honda CBR600RR	22	+24.094	9	8
9	30	(Australia) Billy McConnell	Triumph Daytona 675	22	+26.663	7	7
10	99	(France) Fabien Foret	Kawasaki ZX-6R	22	+26.806	10	6
11	22	(Italy) Roberto Tamburini	Honda CBR600RR	22	+29.832	14	5
12	25	(Italy) Alex Baldolini	Triumph Daytona 675	22	+33.755	16	4
13	3	(Australia) Jed Metcher	Yamaha YZF-R6	22	+34.035	13	3
14	55	(Italy) Massimo Roccoli	Yamaha YZF-R6	22	+34.311	8	2
15	112	(United Kingdom) Luke Mossey	Triumph Daytona 675	22	+34.601	12	1
16	40	(United Kingdom) Martin Jessopp	Honda CBR600RR	22	+46.853	19	
17	74	(United Kingdom) Kieran Clarke	Honda CBR600RR	22	+47.133	21	
18	157	(Italy) Ilario Dionisi	Honda CBR600RR	22	+48.506	18	
19	98	(France) Romain Lanusse	Kawasaki ZX-6R	22	+50.129	23	
20	87	(Italy) Luca Marconi	Yamaha YZF-R6	22	+53.157	20	
21	37	(Austria) David Linortner	Yamaha YZF-R6	22	+53.232	24	
22	8	(Italy) Andrea Antonelli	Honda CBR600RR	22	+1:00.246	29	
23	13	(Italy) Dino Lombardi	Yamaha YZF-R6	22	+1:03.852	28	
24	61	(Italy) Fabio Menghi	Yamaha YZF-R6	22	+1:09.505	25	
25	27	(Switzerland) Thomas Caiani	Honda CBR600RR	21	+1 lap	35	
26	24	(Russia) Eduard Blokhin	Yamaha YZF-R6	21	+1 lap	34	
Ret	17	(Italy) Roberto Anastasia	Honda CBR600RR	14	Retirement	32	
Ret	35	(Italy) Raffaele De Rosa	Honda CBR600RR	12	Accident	17	
Ret	31	(Italy) Vittorio Iannuzzo	Triumph Daytona 675	11	Retirement	27	
Ret	20	(South Africa) Mathew Scholtz	Honda CBR600RR	10	Retirement	15	
Ret	33	(Austria) Yves Polzer	Yamaha YZF-R6	10	Retirement	33	
Ret	10	(Hungary) Imre Tóth	Honda CBR600RR	8	Retirement	22	
Ret	64	(United States) Joshua Day	Kawasaki ZX-6R	4	Retirement	30	
Ret	38	(Hungary) Balázs Németh	Honda CBR600RR	0	Retirement	31	
DNS	65	(Russia) Vladimir Leonov	Yamaha YZF-R6			26	
DNQ	73	(Russia) Oleg Pozdneev	Yamaha YZF-R6				
OFFICIAL SUPERSPORT RACE REPORT
