= 2012 Imola Superbike World Championship round =

(Italy) 2012 Imola Superbike World Championship round
Round details
- Round 2 of 14 rounds in the 2012 Superbike World Championship. and Round 2 of 13 rounds in the 2012 Supersport World Championship.
- Date: 1 April, 2012
- Location: Imola
- Course: Permanent racing facility 4.936 km (3.067 mi)

Superbike World Championship
Pole position
(United Kingdom) Tom Sykes
1:46.748
Fastest lap race 1	Fastest lap race 2
(Spain) Carlos Checa	(United Kingdom) Tom Sykes
1:47.877	1:47.552

Supersport World Championship
Pole position
(United Kingdom) Sam Lowes
1:51.436
Fastest lap
(Australia) Broc Parkes
1:51.952

The 2012 Imola Superbike World Championship round was the second round of the 2012 Superbike World Championship season and of the 2012 Supersport World Championship season. It took place over the weekend of 30 March–1 April 2012 at the Autodromo Enzo e Dino Ferrari near Imola, Italy.

== Superbike ==
=== Race 1 classification ===
Pos	No.	Rider	Bike	Laps	Time	Grid	Points
1	7	(Spain) Carlos Checa	Ducati 1098R	21	38:06.264	3	25
2	66	(United Kingdom) Tom Sykes	Kawasaki ZX-10R	21	+3.206	1	20
3	91	(United Kingdom) Leon Haslam	BMW S1000RR	21	+5.593	4	16
4	3	(Italy) Max Biaggi	Aprilia RSV4 Factory	21	+6.519	5	13
5	58	(Republic of Ireland) Eugene Laverty	Aprilia RSV4 Factory	21	+24.662	11	11
6	33	(Italy) Marco Melandri	BMW S1000RR	21	+27.261	6	10
7	17	(Spain) Joan Lascorz	Kawasaki ZX-10R	21	+27.384	8	9
8	87	(Italy) Lorenzo Zanetti	Ducati 1098R	21	+28.299	9	8
9	65	(United Kingdom) Jonathan Rea	Honda CBR1000RR	21	+34.067	7	7
10	59	(Italy) Niccolò Canepa	Ducati 1098R	21	+35.724	14	6
11	96	(Czech Republic) Jakub Smrž	Ducati 1098R	21	+36.738	10	5
12	121	(France) Maxime Berger	Ducati 1098R	21	+37.257	13	4
13	21	(United States) John Hopkins	Suzuki GSX-R1000	21	+50.418	19	3
14	36	(Argentina) Leandro Mercado	Kawasaki ZX-10R	21	+53.623	24	2
15	86	(Italy) Ayrton Badovini	BMW S1000RR	21	+53.942	16	1
16	68	(Canada) Brett McCormick	Ducati 1098R	21	+54.139	22	
17	18	(Australia) Mark Aitchison	BMW S1000RR	21	+57.944	21	
18	4	(Japan) Hiroshi Aoyama	Honda CBR1000RR	21	+1:06.233	23	
19	44	(Spain) David Salom	Kawasaki ZX-10R	16	+5 laps	20	
Ret	84	(Italy) Michel Fabrizio	BMW S1000RR	8	Retirement	18	
Ret	34	(Italy) Davide Giugliano	Ducati 1098R	8	Retirement	12	
Ret	50	(France) Sylvain Guintoli	Ducati 1098R	1	Retirement	2	
Ret	19	(United Kingdom) Chaz Davies	Aprilia RSV4 Factory	1	Retirement	17	
Ret	2	(United Kingdom) Leon Camier	Suzuki GSX-R1000	0	Retirement	15	
Ret	15	(Italy) Lorenzo Alfonsi	Honda CBR1000RR	0	Retirement	25	
OFFICIAL SUPERBIKE RACE 1 REPORT

=== Race 2 classification ===
Pos	No.	Rider	Bike	Laps	Time	Grid	Points
1	7	(Spain) Carlos Checa	Ducati 1098R	21	37:57.571	3	25
2	66	(United Kingdom) Tom Sykes	Kawasaki ZX-10R	21	+1.935	1	20
3	91	(United Kingdom) Leon Haslam	BMW S1000RR	21	+2.969	4	16
4	3	(Italy) Max Biaggi	Aprilia RSV4 Factory	21	+3.346	5	13
5	65	(United Kingdom) Jonathan Rea	Honda CBR1000RR	21	+18.925	7	11
6	58	(Republic of Ireland) Eugene Laverty	Aprilia RSV4 Factory	21	+21.180	11	10
7	96	(Czech Republic) Jakub Smrž	Ducati 1098R	21	+21.392	10	9
8	2	(United Kingdom) Leon Camier	Suzuki GSX-R1000	21	+23.797	15	8
9	17	(Spain) Joan Lascorz	Kawasaki ZX-10R	21	+24.219	8	7
10	33	(Italy) Marco Melandri	BMW S1000RR	21	+25.599	6	6
11	50	(France) Sylvain Guintoli	Ducati 1098R	21	+25.776	2	5
12	121	(France) Maxime Berger	Ducati 1098R	21	+26.004	13	4
13	87	(Italy) Lorenzo Zanetti	Ducati 1098R	21	+31.172	9	3
14	19	(United Kingdom) Chaz Davies	Aprilia RSV4 Factory	21	+33.837	17	2
15	86	(Italy) Ayrton Badovini	BMW S1000RR	21	+45.541	16	1
16	68	(Canada) Brett McCormick	Ducati 1098R	21	+50.807	22	
17	44	(Spain) David Salom	Kawasaki ZX-10R	21	+51.083	20	
18	18	(Australia) Mark Aitchison	BMW S1000RR	21	+57.833	21	
Ret	34	(Italy) Davide Giugliano	Ducati 1098R	20	Retirement	12	
Ret	59	(Italy) Niccolò Canepa	Ducati 1098R	17	Retirement	14	
Ret	36	(Argentina) Leandro Mercado	Kawasaki ZX-10R	14	Retirement	24	
Ret	4	(Japan) Hiroshi Aoyama	Honda CBR1000RR	12	Retirement	23	
Ret	15	(Italy) Lorenzo Alfonsi	Honda CBR1000RR	8	Retirement	25	
Ret	21	(United States) John Hopkins	Suzuki GSX-R1000	4	Retirement	19	
Ret	84	(Italy) Michel Fabrizio	BMW S1000RR	0	Retirement	18	
OFFICIAL SUPERBIKE RACE 2 REPORT

== Supersport ==
=== Race classification ===
Pos	No.	Rider	Bike	Laps	Time	Grid	Points
1	99	(France) Fabien Foret	Kawasaki ZX-6R	19	35:44.653	6	25
2	11	(United Kingdom) Sam Lowes	Honda CBR600RR	19	+0.574	1	20
3	34	(South Africa) Ronan Quarmby	Honda CBR600RR	19	+17.266	11	16
4	22	(Italy) Roberto Tamburini	Honda CBR600RR	19	+17.270	7	13
5	31	(Italy) Vittorio Iannuzzo	Triumph Daytona 675	19	+22.953	14	11
6	65	(Russia) Vladimir Leonov	Yamaha YZF-R6	19	+25.509	13	10
7	38	(Hungary) Balázs Németh	Honda CBR600RR	19	+30.042	9	9
8	8	(Italy) Andrea Antonelli	Honda CBR600RR	19	+32.429	16	8
9	55	(Italy) Massimo Roccoli	Yamaha YZF-R6	19	+37.894	8	7
10	32	(South Africa) Sheridan Morais	Kawasaki ZX-6R	19	+39.265	2	6
11	25	(Italy) Alex Baldolini	Triumph Daytona 675	19	+46.848	15	5
12	64	(United States) Joshua Day	Kawasaki ZX-6R	19	+56.679	17	4
13	98	(France) Romain Lanusse	Kawasaki ZX-6R	19	+57.925	20	3
14	87	(Italy) Luca Marconi	Yamaha YZF-R6	19	+1:04.381	24	2
15	3	(Australia) Jed Metcher	Yamaha YZF-R6	19	+1:11.922	19	1
16	81	(Italy) Cristiano Erbacci	Yamaha YZF-R6	19	+1:12.356	21	
17	40	(United Kingdom) Martin Jessopp	Honda CBR600RR	19	+1:14.321	18	
18	52	(Czech Republic) Lukáš Pešek	Honda CBR600RR	19	+1:20.799	23	
19	33	(Austria) Yves Polzer	Yamaha YZF-R6	18	+1 lap	27	
20	23	(Australia) Broc Parkes	Honda CBR600RR	18	+1 lap	5	
21	24	(Russia) Eduard Blokhin	Yamaha YZF-R6	17	+2 laps	29	
Ret	13	(Italy) Dino Lombardi	Yamaha YZF-R6	18	Retirement	22	
Ret	61	(Italy) Fabio Menghi	Yamaha YZF-R6	17	Retirement	25	
Ret	10	(Hungary) Imre Tóth	Honda CBR600RR	9	Retirement	12	
Ret	16	(France) Jules Cluzel	Honda CBR600RR	5	Retirement	4	
Ret	18	(Czech Republic) David Látr	Honda CBR600RR	1	Retirement	28	
DSQ	20	(South Africa) Mathew Scholtz	Honda CBR600RR	12	Disqualified	10	
DSQ	54	(Turkey) Kenan Sofuoğlu	Kawasaki ZX-6R	7	Disqualified	3	
DNS	19	(Poland) Paweł Szkopek	Honda CBR600RR			26	
DNQ	27	(Switzerland) Thomas Caiani	Honda CBR600RR				
DNQ	73	(Russia) Oleg Pozdneev	Yamaha YZF-R6				
OFFICIAL SUPERSPORT RACE REPORT

== Superstock ==
=== Superstock 1000 Race classification ===
The race was stopped after 7 laps after Heber Pedrosa crashed at Variante Bassa, the race was later restarted and shortened into 5 lap.

Pos	No.	Rider	Bike	Laps	Time	Grid	Points
1	20	(France) Sylvain Barrier	BMW S1000RR	5	9:25.462	4	25
2	65	(France) Loris Baz	KAwasaki ZX-10R	5	+0.700	5	20
3	47	(Italy) Eddi La Marra	Ducati 1199 Panigale	5	+1.098	1	16
4	21	(Germany) Markus Reiterberger	BMW S1000RR	5	+1.240	2	13
5	67	(Australia) Bryan Staring	Kawasaki ZX-10R	5	+5.638	9	11
6	15	(Italy) Fabio Massei	Honda CBR1000RR	5	+11.703	8	10
7	24	(United Kingdom) Kev Coghlan	Ducati 1199 Panigale	5	+13.079	12	9
8	32	(Italy) Lorenzo Savadori	Ducati 1199 Panigale	5	+13.210	6	8
9	55	(Slovakia) Tomáš Svitok	Ducati 1098R	5	+15.069	16	7
10	37	(Poland) Andrzej Chmielewski	Ducati 1098R	5	+18.545	17	6
11	44	(Italy) Federico Dittadi	Aprilia RSV4 APRC	5	+22.074	14	5
12	40	(Hungary) Alen Győrfi	Honda CBR1000RR	5	+22.840	15	4
13	155	(Portugal) Tiago Dias	Kawasaki ZX-10R	5	+24.262	23	3
14	36	(Brazil) Philippe Thiriet	Kawasaki ZX-10R	5	+28.065	21	2
15	14	(Italy) Lorenzo Baroni	BMW S1000RR	5	+28.286	3	1
Ret	5	(Italy) Marco Bussolotti	Ducati 1098R	2	Accident	7	
Ret	88	(Italy) Massimo Parziani	Aprilia RSV4 APRC	0	Retirement	18	
DNS	42	(Brazil) Heber Pedrosa	Kawasaki ZX-10R	0	Accident (original attempt)	20	
DNS	93	(France) Mathieu Lussiana	Kawasaki ZX-10R	0	Retirement (original attempt)	13	
DNS	71	(Sweden) Christoffer Bergman	Kawasaki ZX-10R	0	Retirement (original attempt)	22	
DNS	39	(France) Randy Pagaud	Kawasaki ZX-10R	0	Retirement (original attempt)	19	
DNS	23	(Italy) Federico Sandi	Ducati 1199 Panigale	0	Accident (original attempt)	11	
DNS	11	(France) Jérémy Guarnoni	Kawasaki ZX-10R	0	Accident (original attempt)	10	
DNQ	61	(Russia) Alexey Ivanov	Ducati 1199 Panigale		Did not qualify		
DNQ	30	(Romania) Bogdan Vrăjitoru	Kawasaki ZX-10R		Did not qualify		
OFFICIAL SUPERSTOCK 1000 RACE REPORT
