= 2012 Assen Superbike World Championship round =

(Netherlands) 2012 Assen Superbike World Championship round
Round details
- Round 3 of 14 rounds in the 2012 Superbike World Championship. and Round 3 of 13 rounds in the 2012 Supersport World Championship.
- Date: 22 April, 2012
- Location: Assen
- Course: Permanent racing facility 4.542 km (2.822 mi)

Superbike World Championship
Pole position
(United Kingdom) Tom Sykes
1:35.399
Fastest lap race 1	Fastest lap race 2
(France) Sylvain Guintoli	(Spain) Carlos Checa
1:57.793	1:38.092

Supersport World Championship
Pole position
(United Kingdom) Sam Lowes
1:38.900
Fastest lap
(Italy) Lorenzo Lanzi
1:59.828

The 2012 Assen Superbike World Championship round was the third round of the 2012 Superbike World Championship season and of the 2012 Supersport World Championship season. It took place over the weekend of 20–22 April 2012 at TT Circuit Assen, Netherlands.

== Superbike ==
=== Race 1 classification ===
The race was red-flagged after 13 laps because of rain and later restarted over 9 laps.

Pos	No.	Rider	Bike	Laps	Time	Grid	Points
1	50	(France) Sylvain Guintoli	Ducati 1098R	9	18:38.395	4	25
2	34	(Italy) Davide Giugliano	Ducati 1098R	9	+2.633	19	20
3	7	(Spain) Carlos Checa	Ducati 1098R	9	+3.031	5	16
4	3	(Italy) Max Biaggi	Aprilia RSV4 Factory	9	+3.927	17	13
5	58	(Republic of Ireland) Eugene Laverty	Aprilia RSV4 Factory	9	+4.374	14	11
6	84	(Italy) Michel Fabrizio	BMW S1000RR	9	+11.359	6	10
7	96	(Czech Republic) Jakub Smrž	Ducati 1098R	9	+26.412	3	9
8	59	(Italy) Niccolò Canepa	Ducati 1098R	9	+37.562	18	8
9	33	(Italy) Marco Melandri	BMW S1000RR	9	+49.896	9	7
10	36	(Argentina) Leandro Mercado	Kawasaki ZX-10R	9	+1:08.847	20	6
11	121	(France) Maxime Berger	Ducati 1098R	9	+1:11.760	15	5
12	4	(Japan) Hiroshi Aoyama	Honda CBR1000RR	9	+1:13.988	21	4
13	44	(Spain) David Salom	Kawasaki ZX-10R	9	+1:27.019	10	3
14	87	(Italy) Lorenzo Zanetti	Ducati 1098R	8	+1 lap	23	2
15	18	(Australia) Mark Aitchison	BMW S1000RR	6	+3 laps	22	1
Ret	86	(Italy) Ayrton Badovini	BMW S1000RR	6	Accident	16	
Ret	19	(United Kingdom) Chaz Davies	Aprilia RSV4 Factory	3	Accident	11	
Ret	91	(United Kingdom) Leon Haslam	BMW S1000RR	2	Accident	7	
Ret	21	(United States) John Hopkins	Suzuki GSX-R1000	1	Accident	8	
Ret	2	(United Kingdom) Leon Camier	Suzuki GSX-R1000	0	Accident	12	
Ret	65	(United Kingdom) Jonathan Rea	Honda CBR1000RR	0	Accident	2	
Ret	66	(United Kingdom) Tom Sykes	Kawasaki ZX-10R		Retired in 1st part	1	
Ret	68	(Canada) Brett McCormick	Ducati 1098R		Accident in 1st part	13	
OFFICIAL SUPERBIKE RACE 1 REPORT

=== Race 2 classification ===
Pos	No.	Rider	Bike	Laps	Time	Grid	Points
1	65	(United Kingdom) Jonathan Rea	Honda CBR1000RR	22	36:45.936	2	25
2	50	(France) Sylvain Guintoli	Ducati 1098R	22	+2.819	4	20
3	58	(Republic of Ireland) Eugene Laverty	Aprilia RSV4 Factory	22	+12.638	14	16
4	33	(Italy) Marco Melandri	BMW S1000RR	22	+12.762	9	13
5	91	(United Kingdom) Leon Haslam	BMW S1000RR	22	+12.764	7	11
6	66	(United Kingdom) Tom Sykes	Kawasaki ZX-10R	22	+20.393	1	10
7	86	(Italy) Ayrton Badovini	BMW S1000RR	22	+36.317	16	9
8	3	(Italy) Max Biaggi	Aprilia RSV4 Factory	22	+37.747	17	8
9	34	(Italy) Davide Giugliano	Ducati 1098R	22	+41.350	19	7
10	84	(Italy) Michel Fabrizio	BMW S1000RR	22	+43.930	6	6
11	21	(United States) John Hopkins	Suzuki GSX-R1000	22	+57.515	8	5
12	44	(Spain) David Salom	Kawasaki ZX-10R	22	+1:32.593	10	4
13	4	(Japan) Hiroshi Aoyama	Honda CBR1000RR	22	+1:33.576	21	3
14	2	(United Kingdom) Leon Camier	Suzuki GSX-R1000	21	+1 lap	12	2
15	36	(Argentina) Leandro Mercado	Kawasaki ZX-10R	21	+1 lap	20	1
16	18	(Australia) Mark Aitchison	BMW S1000RR	21	+1 lap	22	
17	7	(Spain) Carlos Checa	Ducati 1098R	21	+1 lap	5	
Ret	87	(Italy) Lorenzo Zanetti	Ducati 1098R	20	Accident	23	
Ret	96	(Czech Republic) Jakub Smrž	Ducati 1098R	18	Accident	3	
Ret	19	(United Kingdom) Chaz Davies	Aprilia RSV4 Factory	11	Accident	11	
Ret	121	(France) Maxime Berger	Ducati 1098R	11	Accident	15	
Ret	68	(Canada) Brett McCormick	Ducati 1098R	9	Accident	13	
Ret	59	(Italy) Niccolò Canepa	Ducati 1098R	7	Accident	18	
OFFICIAL SUPERBIKE RACE 2 REPORT

== Supersport ==
=== Race classification ===
Pos	No.	Rider	Bike	Laps	Time	Grid	Points
1	57	(Italy) Lorenzo Lanzi	Honda CBR600RR	21	42:56.376	21	25
2	54	(Turkey) Kenan Sofuoğlu	Kawasaki ZX-6R	21	+12.054	4	20
3	65	(Russia) Vladimir Leonov	Yamaha YZF-R6	21	+14.460	8	16
4	23	(Australia) Broc Parkes	Honda CBR600RR	21	+23.884	2	13
5	25	(Italy) Alex Baldolini	Triumph Daytona 675	21	+47.063	20	11
6	16	(France) Jules Cluzel	Honda CBR600RR	21	+49.755	3	10
7	8	(Italy) Andrea Antonelli	Honda CBR600RR	21	+53.850	13	9
8	26	(Netherlands) Twan van Poppel	Yamaha YZF-R6	21	+1:42.505	29	8
9	22	(Italy) Roberto Tamburini	Honda CBR600RR	21	+1:53.053	16	7
10	77	(Netherlands) Stuart Voskamp	Suzuki GSX-R600	21	+1:57.442	17	6
11	98	(France) Romain Lanusse	Kawasaki ZX-6R	21	+1:57.690	18	5
12	27	(Switzerland) Thomas Caiani	Honda CBR600RR	21	+2:03.555	30	4
13	9	(United States) P. J. Jacobsen	Honda CBR600RR	20	+1 lap	24	3
14	87	(Italy) Luca Marconi	Yamaha YZF-R6	20	+1 lap	27	2
15	32	(South Africa) Sheridan Morais	Kawasaki ZX-6R	20	+1 lap	7	1
16	10	(Hungary) Imre Tóth	Honda CBR600RR	20	+1 lap	6	
Ret	31	(Italy) Vittorio Iannuzzo	Triumph Daytona 675	19	Accident	14	
Ret	13	(Italy) Dino Lombardi	Yamaha YZF-R6	19	Accident	22	
Ret	53	(France) Valentin Debise	Honda CBR600RR	13	Retirement	11	
Ret	61	(Italy) Fabio Menghi	Yamaha YZF-R6	12	Retirement	26	
Ret	40	(United Kingdom) Martin Jessopp	Honda CBR600RR	9	Retirement	23	
Ret	55	(Italy) Massimo Roccoli	Yamaha YZF-R6	9	Retirement	9	
Ret	11	(United Kingdom) Sam Lowes	Honda CBR600RR	8	Accident	1	
Ret	34	(South Africa) Ronan Quarmby	Honda CBR600RR	8	Retirement	15	
Ret	38	(Hungary) Balázs Németh	Honda CBR600RR	7	Accident	19	
Ret	20	(South Africa) Mathew Scholtz	Honda CBR600RR	6	Accident	10	
Ret	99	(France) Fabien Foret	Kawasaki ZX-6R	5	Retirement	5	
Ret	33	(Austria) Yves Polzer	Yamaha YZF-R6	5	Retirement	28	
Ret	64	(United States) Joshua Day	Kawasaki ZX-6R	1	Accident	25	
Ret	3	(Australia) Jed Metcher	Yamaha YZF-R6	0	Accident	12	
DNQ	24	(Russia) Eduard Blokhin	Yamaha YZF-R6				
DNQ	73	(Russia) Oleg Pozdneev	Yamaha YZF-R6				
OFFICIAL SUPERSPORT RACE REPORT

== Superstock ==
=== STK1000 Race classification ===
The race was stopped after 8 laps due to track condition caused by a mechanical failure on Federico Sandi's Ducati 1199 Panigale. The race wasn't restarted as the 2/3 distance have been completed.

Pos	No.	Rider	Bike	Laps	Time	Grid	Points
1	20	(France) Sylvain Barrier	BMW S1000RR	8	13:34.645	1	25
2	32	(Italy) Lorenzo Savadori	Ducati 1199 Panigale R	8	+0.732	7	20
3	47	(Italy) Eddi La Marra	Ducati 1199 Panigale	8	+0.823	5	16
4	21	(Germany) Markus Reiterberger	BMW S1000RR	8	+3.962	10	13
5	14	(Italy) Lorenzo Baroni	BMW S1000RR	8	+4.264	3	11
6	65	(France) Loris Baz	Kawasaki ZX-10R	8	+8.525 (Note: 5-second penalty.)	4	10
7	11	(France) Jérémy Guarnoni	Kawasaki ZX-10R	8	+10.834	9	9
8	71	(Sweden) Christoffer Bergman	Kawasaki ZX-10R	8	+11.402	12	8
9	5	(Italy) Marco Bussolotti	Ducati 1098R	8	+11.620	8	7
10	93	(France) Mathieu Lussiana	Kawasaki ZX-10R	8	+20.351	11	6
11	24	(United Kingdom) Kev Coghlan	Ducati 1199 Panigale R	8	+20.480	14	5
12	39	(France) Randy Pagaud	Kawasaki ZX-10R	8	+52.720	18	4
13	37	(Poland) Andrzej Chmielewski	Ducati 1098R	8	+1:01.572 (Note: 30-second penalty.)	16	3
14	36	(Brazil) Philippe Thiriet	Kawasaki ZX-10R	8	+1:29.775 (Note: 30-second penalty.)	22	2
15	17	(Brazil) Danilo Lewis da Silva	Kawasaki ZX-10R	8	+1:29.983 (Note: 30-second penalty.)	19	1
NC	30	(Romania) Bogdan Vrăjitoru	Kawasaki ZX-10R	5	+3 lap	23	
Ret	23	(Italy) Federico Sandi	Ducati 1199 Panigale	7	Retirement	13	
Ret	40	(Hungary) Alen Győrfi	Honda CBR1000RR	4	Accident	17	
Ret	88	(Italy) Massimo Parziani	Aprilia RSV4 APRC	2	Accident	20	
Ret	67	(Australia) Bryan Staring	Kawasaki ZX-10R	1	Accident	2	
Ret	155	(Portugal) Tiago Dias	Kawasaki ZX-10R	1	Accident	21	
Ret	15	(Italy) Fabio Massei	Honda CBR1000RR	0	Accident	6	
DNS	55	(Slovakia) Tomáš Svitok	Ducati 1098R	0	Did not start	15	
DNQ	61	(Russia) Alexey Ivanov	Ducati 1199 Panigale		Did not qualify		
OFFICIAL SUPERSTOCK 1000 RACE REPORT
