= 2012 Monza Superbike World Championship round =

(Italy) 2012 Monza Superbike World Championship round
Round details
- Round 4 of 14 rounds in the 2012 Superbike World Championship. and Round 4 of 13 rounds in the 2012 Supersport World Championship.
- Date: May 6, 2012
- Location: Monza
- Course: Permanent racing facility 5.777 km (3.590 mi)

Superbike World Championship
Pole position
(France) Sylvain Guintoli
1:54.276
Fastest lap race 1	Fastest lap race 2
n/a	(United Kingdom) Tom Sykes
	1:44.707

Supersport World Championship
Pole position
(United Kingdom) Sam Lowes
1:47.601
Fastest lap
(United Kingdom) Sam Lowes
2:00.653

The 2012 Monza Superbike World Championship round was the fourth round of the 2012 Superbike World Championship season and of the 2012 Supersport World Championship season. It took place on the weekend of May 4–6, 2012 at the Autodromo Nazionale Monza located in Monza, Italy.

== Superbike ==
=== Report ===
At this round the championship held an awards ceremony marking their 25th anniversary, this however would be a round full of incident, the conditions were changeable throughout the weekend, and during a wet superpole riders were unable to make their wet tyres last more than 2 laps due to the tyres falling apart down the center due to the high speed nature of the Monza circuit. The race started dry but Mark Aitchison fell at the final turn on the warm up lap then John Hopkins and Marco Melandri, would also go down at the final turn. The race was stopped as the rain persisted and race 1 was canceled on safety grounds. Race 2 was run in similar conditions with the rain falling just after half distance meaning that half points were awarded. After the debacle Team Effenbert Liberty Racing hit out at WSBK organizers for favoring a few riders in the cancellation of race 1, putting doubt into their further participation in the championship. Pirelli the lone tyre provider hit back at complaints from the riders who Pirelli say ignored the advice to use the intermediate tyres during the wet/dry racing. Liberty racing later released a statement backtracking on was said in the wake of Monza and confirming that the team would be competing at the next round but hinted that the title sponsor Effenbert may scale back their branding in way of protest.

=== Race 2 classification ===
Pos	No.	Rider	Bike	Laps	Time	Grid	Points
1	66	(United Kingdom) Tom Sykes	Kawasaki ZX-10R	8	14:08.800	2	12.5
2	91	(United Kingdom) Leon Haslam	BMW S1000RR	8	+9.709	13	10
3	58	(Republic of Ireland) Eugene Laverty	Aprilia RSV4 Factory	8	+10.119	9	8
4	33	(Italy) Marco Melandri	BMW S1000RR	8	+10.294	3	6.5
5	3	(Italy) Max Biaggi	Aprilia RSV4 Factory	8	+10.527	6	5.5
6	65	(United Kingdom) Jonathan Rea	Honda CBR1000RR	8	+10.638	5	5
7	7	(Spain) Carlos Checa	Ducati 1098R	8	+10.899	4	4.5
8	34	(Italy) Davide Giugliano	Ducati 1098R	8	+12.195	8	4
9	96	(Czech Republic) Jakub Smrž	Ducati 1098R	8	+13.199	7	3.5
10	86	(Italy) Ayrton Badovini	BMW S1000RR	8	+19.372	12	3
11	4	(Japan) Hiroshi Aoyama	Honda CBR1000RR	8	+24.551	18	2.5
12	19	(United Kingdom) Chaz Davies	Aprilia RSV4 Factory	8	+24.655	14	2
13	121	(France) Maxime Berger	Ducati 1098R	8	+24.662	17	1.5
14	87	(Italy) Lorenzo Zanetti	Ducati 1098R	8	+24.668	15	1
15	2	(United Kingdom) Leon Camier	Suzuki GSX-R1000	8	+24.810	11	0.5
16	36	(Argentina) Leandro Mercado	Kawasaki ZX-10R	8	+24.935	19	
17	59	(Italy) Niccolò Canepa	Ducati 1098R	8	+25.278	16	
DNS	84	(Italy) Michel Fabrizio	BMW S1000RR			10	
DNS	50	(France) Sylvain Guintoli	Ducati 1098R			1	
DNS	199	(Spain) Sergio Gadea	Kawasaki ZX-10R			21	
DNS	18	(Australia) Mark Aitchison	BMW S1000RR			20	
DNS	21	(United States) John Hopkins	Suzuki GSX-R1000				
DNS	44	(Spain) David Salom	Kawasaki ZX-10R				
OFFICIAL SUPERBIKE RACE 2 REPORT

== Supersport ==
=== Race classification ===
Pos	No.	Rider	Bike	Laps	Time	Grid	Points
1	16	(France) Jules Cluzel	Honda CBR600RR	16	33:08.897	10	25
2	11	(United Kingdom) Sam Lowes	Honda CBR600RR	16	+0.312	1	20
3	54	(Turkey) Kenan Sofuoğlu	Kawasaki ZX-6R	16	+17.369	2	16
4	10	(Hungary) Imre Tóth	Honda CBR600RR	16	+21.528	11	13
5	12	(Italy) Stefano Cruciani	Kawasaki ZX-6R	16	+29.469	5	11
6	25	(Italy) Alex Baldolini	Triumph Daytona 675	16	+32.214	19	10
7	55	(Italy) Massimo Roccoli	Yamaha YZF-R6	16	+43.577	9	9
8	8	(Italy) Andrea Antonelli	Honda CBR600RR	16	+43.949	16	8
9	31	(Italy) Vittorio Iannuzzo	Triumph Daytona 675	16	+47.455	21	7
10	35	(Italy) Raffaele De Rosa	Honda CBR600RR	16	+47.826	22	6
11	3	(Australia) Jed Metcher	Yamaha YZF-R6	16	+50.880	27	5
12	99	(France) Fabien Foret	Kawasaki ZX-6R	16	+1:00.681	4	4
13	87	(Italy) Luca Marconi	Yamaha YZF-R6	16	+1:01.139	13	3
14	74	(United Kingdom) Kieran Clarke	Honda CBR600RR	16	+1:05.160	32	2
15	40	(United Kingdom) Martin Jessopp	Honda CBR600RR	16	+1:05.208	25	1
16	22	(Italy) Roberto Tamburini	Honda CBR600RR	16	+1:10.453	6	
17	6	(Italy) Mirko Giansanti	Kawasaki ZX-6R	16	+1:16.756	18	
18	64	(United States) Joshua Day	Kawasaki ZX-6R	16	+1:21.270	26	
19	88	(Italy) Giovanni Altomonte	Honda CBR600RR	16	+1:28.024	33	
20	17	(Italy) Roberto Anastasia	Honda CBR600RR	16	+1:28.403	30	
21	61	(Italy) Fabio Menghi	Yamaha YZF-R6	16	+1:48.237	14	
22	13	(Italy) Dino Lombardi	Yamaha YZF-R6	16	+1:59.036	24	
23	53	(France) Valentin Debise	Honda CBR600RR	16	+2:00.983	29	
24	27	(Switzerland) Thomas Caiani	Honda CBR600RR	15	+1 lap	35	
25	33	(Austria) Yves Polzer	Yamaha YZF-R6	15	+1 lap	31	
26	24	(Russia) Eduard Blokhin	Yamaha YZF-R6	15	+1 lap	34	
Ret	98	(France) Romain Lanusse	Kawasaki ZX-6R	15	Retirement	17	
Ret	23	(Australia) Broc Parkes	Honda CBR600RR	13	Retirement	7	
Ret	81	(Italy) Cristiano Erbacci	Yamaha YZF-R6	8	Accident	23	
Ret	157	(Italy) Ilario Dionisi	Honda CBR600RR	6	Retirement	20	
Ret	65	(Russia) Vladimir Leonov	Yamaha YZF-R6	5	Accident	15	
Ret	20	(South Africa) Mathew Scholtz	Honda CBR600RR	5	Accident	8	
Ret	38	(Hungary) Balázs Németh	Honda CBR600RR	5	Accident	28	
Ret	32	(South Africa) Sheridan Morais	Kawasaki ZX-6R	3	Accident	3	
Ret	34	(South Africa) Ronan Quarmby	Honda CBR600RR	1	Accident	12	
DNQ	73	(Russia) Oleg Pozdneev	Yamaha YZF-R6				
OFFICIAL SUPERSPORT RACE REPORT

== Superstock ==
=== STK1000 race classification ===
Pos	No.	Rider	Bike	Laps	Time	Grid	Points
1	32	(Italy) Lorenzo Savadori	Ducati 1199 Panigale	11	21:21.255	2	25
2	71	(Sweden) Christoffer Bergman	Kawasaki ZX-10R	11	+1.651	5	20
3	47	(Italy) Eddi La Marra	Ducati 1199 Panigale	11	+1.884	4	16
4	15	(Italy) Fabio Massei	Honda CBR1000RR	11	+3.071	10	13
5	5	(Italy) Marco Bussolotti	Ducati 1098R	11	+11.194	8	11
6	40	(Hungary) Alen Győrfi	Honda CBR1000RR	11	+21.378	14	10
7	21	(Germany) Markus Reiterberger	BMW S1000RR	11	+26.047	6	9
8	14	(Italy) Lorenzo Baroni	BMW S1000RR	11	+30.259	3	8
9	11	(France) Jérémy Guarnoni	Kawasaki ZX-10R	11	+31.224	9	7
10	44	(Italy) Federico Dittadi	Aprilia RSV4 APRC	11	+51.230	12	6
11	22	(Italy) Matteo Gabrielli	Aprilia RSV4 APRC	11	+57.305	13	5
12	55	(Slovakia) Tomáš Svitok	Ducati 1098R	11	+1:01.806	16	4
13	93	(France) Mathieu Lussiana	Kawasaki ZX-10R	11	+1:01.972	7	3
14	39	(France) Randy Pagaud	Kawasaki ZX-10R	11	+1:14.045	19	2
15	30	(Romania) Bogdan Vrăjitoru	Kawasaki ZX-10R	11	+1:22.095	25	1
16	36	(Brazil) Philippe Thiriet	Kawasaki ZX-10R	11	+2.01.823	20	
17	88	(Italy) Massimo Parziani	Aprilia RSV4 APRC	10	+1 lap	18	
18	61	(Russia) Alexey Ivanov	Ducati 1199 Panigale	10	+1 lap	24	
19	155	(Portugal) Tiago Dias	Kawasaki ZX-10R	10	+1 lap	22	
20	17	(Brazil) Danilo Lewis da Silva	Kawasaki ZX-10R	10	+1 lap	23	
Ret	41	(Italy) Tommaso Gabrielli	Aprilia RSV4 APRC	10	Accident	21	
Ret	20	(France) Sylvain Barrier	BMW S1000RR	8	Accident	1	
Ret	37	(Poland) Andrzej Chmielewski	Ducati 1098R	7	Accident	17	
Ret	65	(France) Loris Baz	Kawasaki ZX-10R	4	Accident	11	
Ret	69	(Czech Republic) Ondřej Ježek	Ducati 1098R	1	Retirement	15	
DNS	67	(Australia) Bryan Staring	Kawasaki ZX-10R		Did not start		
WD	24	(United Kingdom) Kev Coghlan	Ducati 1199 Panigale		Withdrew		
OFFICIAL SUPERSTOCK 1000 RACE REPORT
