= 2012 Misano Superbike World Championship round =

(Italy) 2012 Misano Superbike World Championship round
Round details
- Round 7 of 14 rounds in the 2012 Superbike World Championship. and Round 6 of 13 rounds in the 2012 Supersport World Championship.
- Date: June 10, 2012
- Location: Misano World Circuit Marco Simoncelli
- Course: Permanent racing facility 4.226 km (2.626 mi)

Superbike World Championship
Pole position
(United Kingdom) Tom Sykes
1:35.375
Fastest lap race 1	Fastest lap race 2
(Spain) Carlos Checa	(Italy) Max Biaggi
1:36.080	1:36.557

Supersport World Championship
Pole position
(United Kingdom) Sam Lowes
1:38.987
Fastest lap
(France) Fabien Foret
1:39.513

The 2012 Misano Superbike World Championship round was the seventh round of the 2012 Superbike World Championship season and the sixth round of the 2012 Supersport World Championship season. It took place on the weekend of June 8–10, 2012 at Misano World Circuit Marco Simoncelli, in Misano Adriatico, Italy.

== Superbike ==
=== Race 1 classification ===
Pos	No.	Rider	Bike	Laps	Time	Grid	Points
1	3	(Italy) Max Biaggi	Aprilia RSV4 Factory	24	38:58.471	10	25
2	7	(Spain) Carlos Checa	Ducati 1098R	24	+0.305	16	20
3	34	(Italy) Davide Giugliano	Ducati 1098R	24	+4.503	4	16
4	66	(United Kingdom) Tom Sykes	Kawasaki ZX-10R	24	+8.858	1	13
5	65	(United Kingdom) Jonathan Rea	Honda CBR1000RR	24	+11.627	2	11
6	19	(United Kingdom) Chaz Davies	Aprilia RSV4 Factory	24	+12.258	21	10
7	58	(Republic of Ireland) Eugene Laverty	Aprilia RSV4 Factory	24	+12.551	7	9
8	50	(France) Sylvain Guintoli	Ducati 1098R	24	+13.561	8	8
9	96	(Czech Republic) Jakub Smrž	Ducati 1098R	24	+17.014	5	7
10	2	(United Kingdom) Leon Camier	Suzuki GSX-R1000	24	+18.361	14	6
11	86	(Italy) Ayrton Badovini	BMW S1000RR	24	+20.029	3	5
12	91	(United Kingdom) Leon Haslam	BMW S1000RR	24	+22.082	6	4
13	121	(France) Maxime Berger	Ducati 1098R	24	+22.966	17	3
14	84	(Italy) Michel Fabrizio	BMW S1000RR	24	+27.014	12	2
15	151	(Italy) Matteo Baiocco	Ducati 1098R	24	+31.133	9	1
16	4	(Japan) Hiroshi Aoyama	Honda CBR1000RR	24	+31.719	20	
17	21	(United States) John Hopkins	Suzuki GSX-R1000	24	+31.902	18	
18	59	(Italy) Niccolò Canepa	Ducati 1098R	24	+43.770	19	
19	36	(Argentina) Leandro Mercado	Kawasaki ZX-10R	24	+55.071	23	
20	23	(Italy) Federico Sandi	BMW S1000RR	18	+6 laps	24	
Ret	33	(Italy) Marco Melandri	BMW S1000RR	21	Retirement	13	
Ret	76	(France) Loris Baz	Kawasaki ZX-10R	13	Retirement	11	
Ret	44	(Spain) David Salom	Kawasaki ZX-10R	12	Retirement	22	
Ret	87	(Italy) Lorenzo Zanetti	Ducati 1098R	6	Retirement	15	
OFFICIAL SUPERBIKE RACE 1 REPORT

=== Race 2 classification ===
Pos	No.	Rider	Bike	Laps	Time	Grid	Points
1	3	(Italy) Max Biaggi	Aprilia RSV4 Factory	24	39:01.869	10	25
2	65	(United Kingdom) Jonathan Rea	Honda CBR1000RR	24	+5.355	2	20
3	91	(United Kingdom) Leon Haslam	BMW S1000RR	24	+5.731	6	16
4	33	(Italy) Marco Melandri	BMW S1000RR	24	+7.004	13	13
5	86	(Italy) Ayrton Badovini	BMW S1000RR	24	+7.921	3	11
6	84	(Italy) Michel Fabrizio	BMW S1000RR	24	+17.291	12	10
7	66	(United Kingdom) Tom Sykes	Kawasaki ZX-10R	24	+17.351	1	9
8	76	(France) Loris Baz	Kawasaki ZX-10R	24	+17.630	11	8
9	96	(Czech Republic) Jakub Smrž	Ducati 1098R	24	+18.211	5	7
10	151	(Italy) Matteo Baiocco	Ducati 1098R	24	+28.131	9	6
11	121	(France) Maxime Berger	Ducati 1098R	24	+28.407	17	5
12	4	(Japan) Hiroshi Aoyama	Honda CBR1000RR	24	+38.060	20	4
13	59	(Italy) Niccolò Canepa	Ducati 1098R	24	+49.003	19	3
14	21	(United States) John Hopkins	Suzuki GSX-R1000	24	+51.881	18	2
15	2	(United Kingdom) Leon Camier	Suzuki GSX-R1000	24	+55.502	14	1
16	36	(Argentina) Leandro Mercado	Kawasaki ZX-10R	24	+1:06.361	23	
17	23	(Italy) Federico Sandi	BMW S1000RR	24	+1:29.918	24	
Ret	58	(Republic of Ireland) Eugene Laverty	Aprilia RSV4 Factory	19	Retirement	7	
Ret	19	(United Kingdom) Chaz Davies	Aprilia RSV4 Factory	15	Accident	21	
Ret	44	(Spain) David Salom	Kawasaki ZX-10R	7	Accident	22	
Ret	34	(Italy) Davide Giugliano	Ducati 1098R	5	Accident	4	
Ret	7	(Spain) Carlos Checa	Ducati 1098R	3	Retirement	16	
Ret	87	(Italy) Lorenzo Zanetti	Ducati 1098R	2	Retirement	15	
Ret	50	(France) Sylvain Guintoli	Ducati 1098R	1	Accident	8	
OFFICIAL SUPERBIKE RACE 2 REPORT

== Supersport ==
=== Race classification ===
Pos	No.	Rider	Bike	Laps	Time	Grid	Points
1	54	(Turkey) Kenan Sofuoğlu	Kawasaki ZX-6R	22	36:44.023	3	25
2	16	(France) Jules Cluzel	Honda CBR600RR	22	+1.228	2	20
3	25	(Italy) Alex Baldolini	Triumph Daytona 675	22	+20.597	12	16
4	22	(Italy) Roberto Tamburini	Honda CBR600RR	22	+21.800	10	13
5	23	(Australia) Broc Parkes	Honda CBR600RR	22	+26.357	4	11
6	32	(South Africa) Sheridan Morais	Kawasaki ZX-6R	22	+26.935	8	10
7	3	(Australia) Jed Metcher	Yamaha YZF-R6	22	+33.183	13	9
8	99	(France) Fabien Foret	Kawasaki ZX-6R	22	+34.587	6	8
9	31	(Italy) Vittorio Iannuzzo	Triumph Daytona 675	22	+36.853	11	7
10	8	(Italy) Andrea Antonelli	Yamaha YZF-R6	22	+38.213	19	6
11	35	(Italy) Raffaele De Rosa	Honda CBR600RR	22	+42.428	14	5
12	38	(Hungary) Balázs Németh	Honda CBR600RR	22	+42.446	24	4
13	10	(Hungary) Imre Tóth	Honda CBR600RR	22	+48.802	18	3
14	13	(Italy) Dino Lombardi	Yamaha YZF-R6	22	+49.992	22	2
15	14	(Hungary) Gábor Talmácsi	Honda CBR600RR	22	+53.515	21	1
16	87	(Italy) Luca Marconi	Yamaha YZF-R6	22	+57.766	15	
17	64	(United States) Joshua Day	Kawasaki ZX-6R	22	+58.760	25	
18	11	(United Kingdom) Sam Lowes	Honda CBR600RR	22	+1:05.650	1	
19	40	(United Kingdom) Martin Jessopp	Honda CBR600RR	22	+1:10.291	27	
20	21	(Italy) Alessandro Andreozzi	Yamaha YZF-R6	22	+1:15.799	29	
21	33	(Austria) Yves Polzer	Yamaha YZF-R6	21	+1 lap	32	
22	73	(Russia) Oleg Pozdneev	Yamaha YZF-R6	21	+1 lap	33	
Ret	61	(Italy) Fabio Menghi	Yamaha YZF-R6	18	Retirement	20	
Ret	53	(France) Valentin Debise	Honda CBR600RR	11	Retirement	17	
Ret	91	(Poland) Marek Szkopek	Honda CBR600RR	11	Accident	28	
Ret	17	(Italy) Roberto Anastasia	Honda CBR600RR	9	Retirement	30	
Ret	12	(Italy) Stefano Cruciani	Kawasaki ZX-6R	6	Retirement	9	
Ret	34	(South Africa) Ronan Quarmby	Honda CBR600RR	6	Retirement	7	
Ret	24	(Russia) Eduard Blokhin	Yamaha YZF-R6	5	Retirement	31	
Ret	20	(South Africa) Mathew Scholtz	Honda CBR600RR	4	Accident	16	
Ret	98	(France) Romain Lanusse	Kawasaki ZX-6R	4	Retirement	23	
Ret	55	(Italy) Massimo Roccoli	Yamaha YZF-R6	2	Retirement	5	
Ret	44	(Italy) Alessandro Torcolacci	Honda CBR600RR	2	Accident	26	
OFFICIAL SUPERSPORT RACE REPORT

== Superstock ==
=== STK1000 Race classification ===
The race was stopped after 3 laps due to track condition, it was later restarted and was shortened into 6 lap

Pos	No.	Rider	Bike	Laps	Time	Grid	Points
1	20	(France) Sylvain Barrier	BMW S1000RR	6	10:06.206	7	25
2	14	(Italy) Lorenzo Baroni	BMW S1000RR	6	+0.137	4	20
3	119	(Italy) Michele Magnoni	BMW S1000RR	6	+0.528	3	16
4	47	(Italy) Eddi La Marra	Ducati 1199 Panigale	6	+0.571	1	13
5	32	(Italy) Lorenzo Savadori	Ducati 1199 Panigale	6	+2.269	6	11
6	11	(France) Jérémy Guarnoni	Kawasaki ZX-10R	6	+2.572	2	10
7	67	(Australia) Bryan Staring	Kawasaki ZX-10R	6	+2.655	13	9
8	24	(United Kingdom) Kev Coghlan	Ducati 1199 Panigale	6	+5.718	14	8
9	15	(Italy) Fabio Massei	Honda CBR1000RR	6	+7.513	9	7
10	21	(Germany) Markus Reiterberger	BMW S1000RR	6	+7.657	5	6
11	71	(Sweden) Christoffer Bergman	Kawasaki ZX-10R	6	+8.108	15	5
12	44	(Italy) Federico Dittadi	Aprilia RSV4 APRC	6	+9.528	11	4
13	69	(Czech Republic) Ondřej Ježek	Ducati 1098R	6	+13.646	12	3
14	36	(Brazil) Philippe Thiriet	Kawasaki ZX-10R	6	+16.602	26	2
15	41	(Italy) Tommaso Gabrielli	Aprilia RSV4 APRC	6	+17.261	25	1
16	37	(Poland) Andrzej Chmielewski	Ducati 1098R	6	+18.436	22	
17	89	(Italy) Domenico Colucci	BMW S1000RR	6	+18.590	16	
18	22	(Italy) Matteo Gabrielli	Aprilia RSV4 APRC	6	+19.137	19	
19	26	(Czech Republic) Jan Halbich	Kawasaki ZX-10R	6	+19.961	18	
20	88	(Italy) Massimo Parziani	Aprilia RSV4 APRC	6	+22.085	27	
21	155	(Portugal) Tiago Dias	Kawasaki ZX-10R	6	+23.856	28	
22	40	(Hungary) Alen Győrfi	Honda CBR1000RR	6	+24.252	20	
23	8	(Italy) Federico Mandatori	Suzuki GSX-R1000	6	+24.624	29	
24	91	(Italy) Riccardo Fusco	BMW S1000RR	6	+25.866	24	
25	39	(France) Randy Pagaud	Kawasaki ZX-10R	6	+26.283	23	
26	30	(Romania) Bogdan Vrăjitoru	Kawasaki ZX-10R	6	+26.472	30	
27	93	(France) Mathieu Lussiana	Kawasaki ZX-10R	6	+41.027	17	
Ret	5	(Italy) Marco Bussolotti	Ducati 1098R	2	Accident	8	
Ret	169	(South Africa) David McFadden	Kawasaki ZX-10R	2	Accident	10	
Ret	55	(Slovakia) Tomáš Svitok	Ducati 1098R	0	Retirement	21	
DNS	61	(Russia) Alexey Ivanov	Ducati 1199 Panigale		Did not start		
OFFICIAL SUPERSTOCK 1000 RACE REPORT
