= Moscow Raceway =

Auto racing track in Moscow, Russia

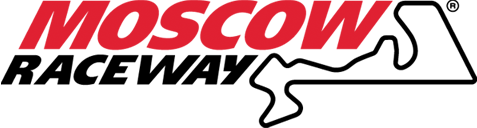

- "Grand Prix #9" layout (2012–present)
- Location: Volokolamsk, Moscow Oblast, Russia
- Coordinates: 55°59′45.8″N 36°16′6.1″E
- Capacity: 30,000
- FIA Grade: 1 (Grand Prix #1) (Note: Moscow Raceway's Grade 1 license expired 3 July 2024. Only the Grand Prix #1 layout officially possessed this designation.)
- Broke ground: 1 October 2008; 17 years ago
- Opened: 13 July 2012; 14 years ago
- Construction cost: 4.5 billion rub. ~$150 million
- Architect: Hermann Tilke
- Major events: Current: Russian Circuit Racing Series (2012–present); SMP F4 Championship (2015–2019, 2025–present); Former: WTCC Race of Russia (2013–2015); World SBK (2012–2013); DTM (2013–2017); Blancpain GT Series (2015); FIA GT1 (2012); World Series by Renault (2012–2014)
- Website: https://moscowraceway.ru/

Grand Prix #9 (2012–present)
- Surface: Asphalt
- Length: 3.931 km (2.443 mi)
- Turns: 13
- Race lap record: 1:21.686 ( (Belgium) Stoffel Vandoorne, Dallara T12, 2013, FR 3.5)

Grand Prix #1 (2012–present)
- Surface: Asphalt
- Length: 3.955 km (2.458 mi)
- Turns: 15
- Race lap record: 1:24.831 ( (France) Arthur Pic, Dallara T12, 2012, FR 3.5)

Sprint #4 (2012–present)
- Surface: Asphalt
- Length: 2.545 km (1.581 mi)
- Turns: 10
- Race lap record: 0:58.999 ( (France) Adrien Tambay, Audi RS5 DTM, 2013, DTM)

Moscow Raceway is an FIA-approved motor racing venue in the Volokolamsky District, Moscow Oblast, Russia. It is located near the villages of Sheludkovo and Fedyukovo, about 97-kilometre (60 mi) west from Moscow.

It opened on 13 July 2012 for its first event as the fifth round of the World Series by Renault becoming the first major international motor-sport race track event in Russia. It is an FIA Grade 1 circuit, which means that it has all the requirements necessary to host a Formula One race, though the Sochi Autodrom previously hosted Russian Formula One races during the existence of the Russian Grand Prix as a World Championship event.

== History ==
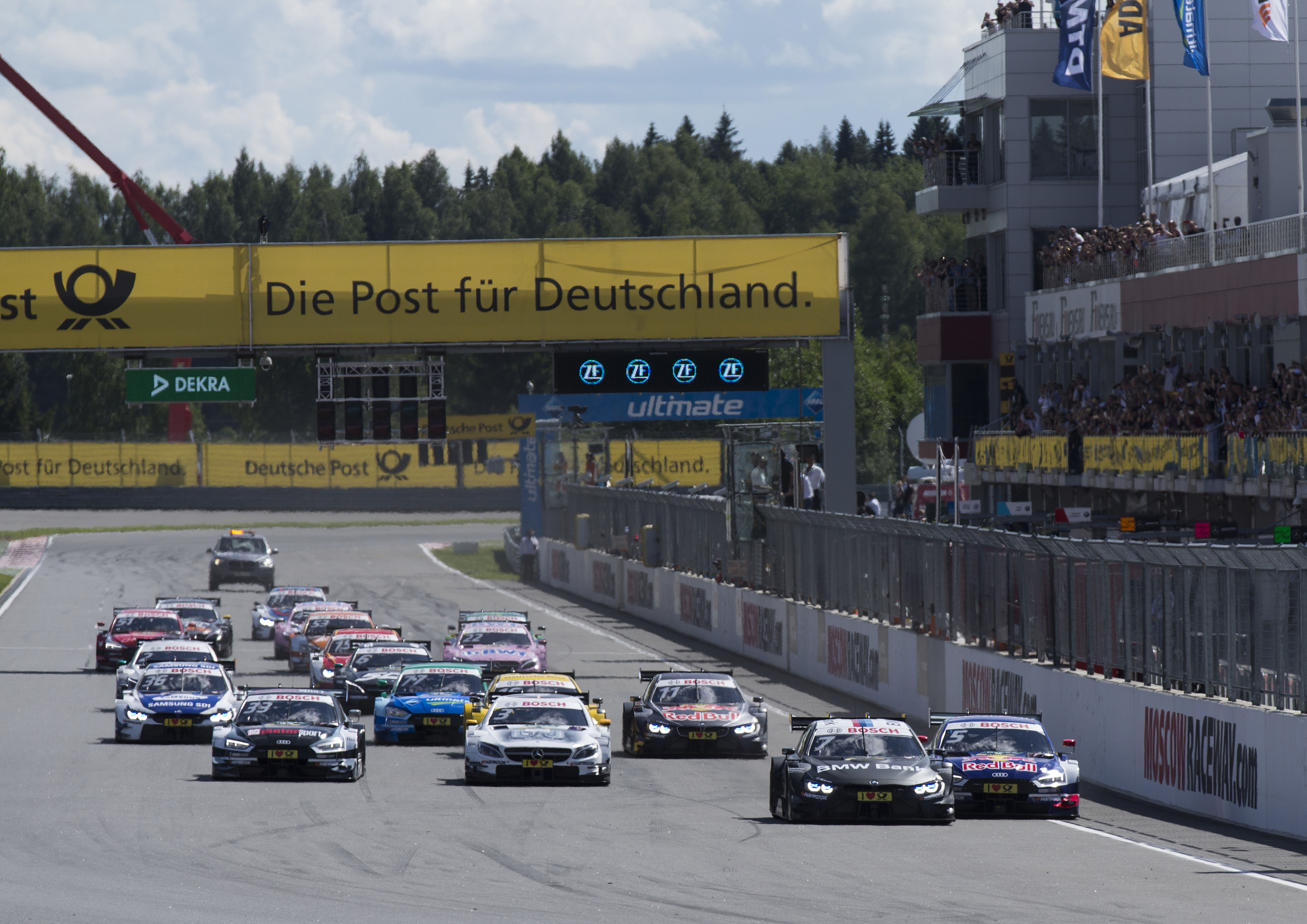
DTM race at Moscow Raceway in 2017.

In September 2008, it was revealed that work was to begin on a Formula One circuit to be located at the village of Fedyukovo, Volokolamsky District. Hans Geist, who at that time was the managing director of the project, stated that the track could pass an FIA inspection by June 2010, and that even without Formula 1 the project would be profitable staging either DTM or MotoGP. The cost of the project overall was 4.5 billion rub when it opened on 13 July 2012.

=== Design ===
Moscow Raceway was designed to be categorized FIA 1T and FIM A, which would allow motorsport competition at any level, from national championships in auto and motorcycle racing, to Formula 1 and MotoGP. The total designed track length is 4.070 km (2.529 mi), with widths of between 12 and 21 m (39 and 69 ft). The start/finish line has a width of 15 m (49 ft) at an elevation of 22 m (72 ft). The longest straight of 0.873 km (0.542 mi) is designed to allow Formula 1 cars to reach a speed of 311 km/h (193 mph). The circuit was finally classified as a FIM B grade course following inspections on 18 July 2012, one grade down from what was expected.

=== Construction ===
Built under a Russian–German joint venture named "Autobahn", the general contractor for construction of buildings and race track to international level was Stroytech-5, a member of a group of companies Stroytech. Sub-contract partners included Siemens, while Sergei Krylov was working as an adviser.

After initially signing a deal with Bernie Ecclestone in 2008, the project was dropped from the 2010 Formula 1 calendar in early 2009, and construction stopped. Construction resumed in June 2010, with the new contractor agreeing to complete the road section of the track by the end of 2011.

=== Race history ===
The first events held at the circuit were part of the World Series by Renault on 13–15 July 2012, where it also became the second international motor-sport event in Russian history after the FIA European Truck Racing Championship event took place in the Smolenskring in July 2010. The first race itself was the 5th round of the Formula Renault 3.5 series, which was won by Dutchman Robin Frijns. The first Russian to win a race there soon followed with Daniil Kvyat winning both races of the Eurocup Formula Renault 2.0 series round in a row. A total of 10 Russian drivers were at the event including former 3.5 series Champion Mikhail Aleshin; many taking over other drivers for just this event.

On 21 July 2013, during the World Superbike weekend, Italian rider Andrea Antonelli was killed in the World Supersport race after being hit on the back straight by fellow rider Lorenzo Zanetti. Antonelli was airlifted to hospital where he died of massive head trauma, and the rest of the weekend's action was cancelled due to the torrential downpour.

== Configurations ==
=== Layouts ===
"Grand Prix #1"

"Grand Prix #9"

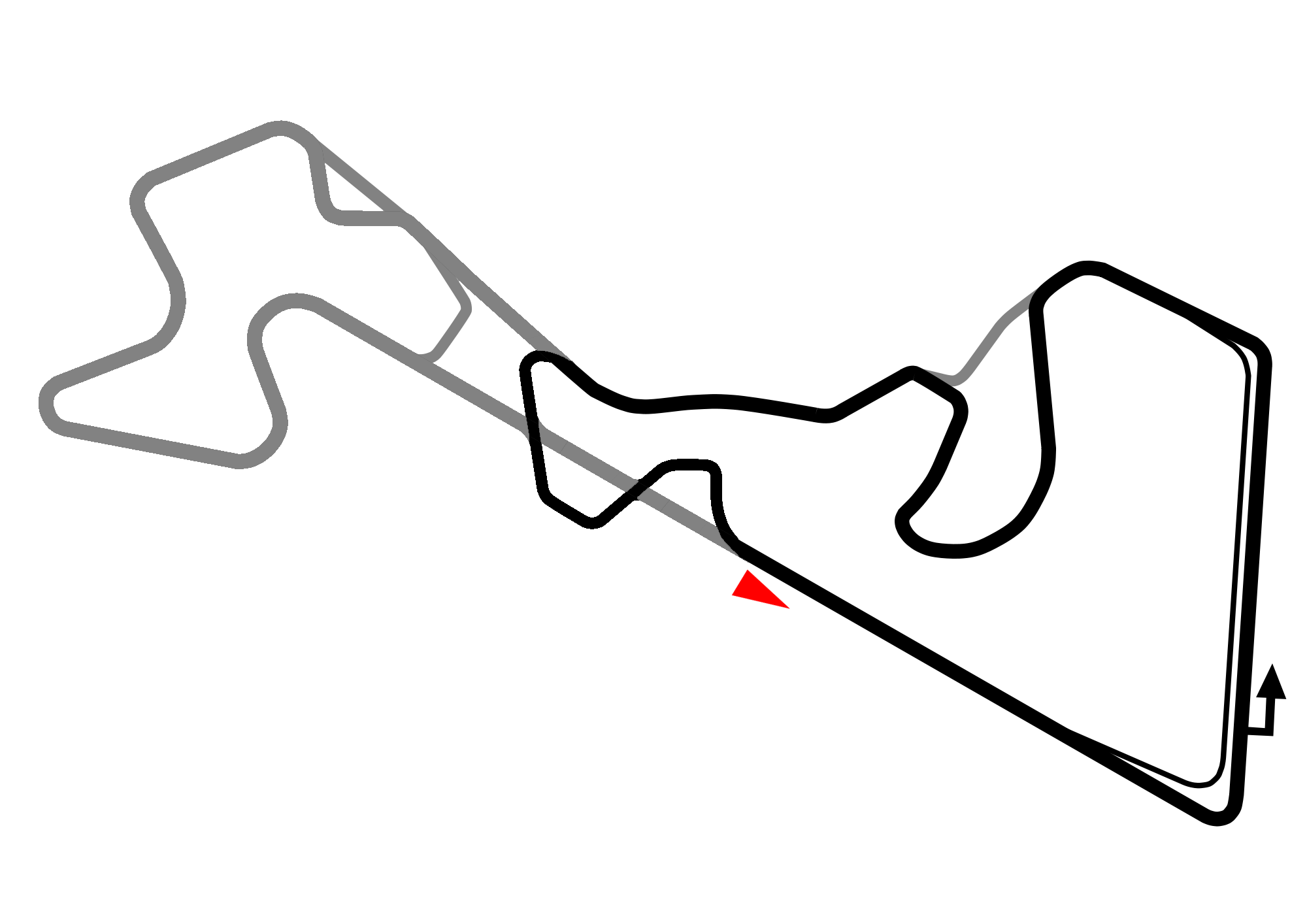
"Sprint #1"

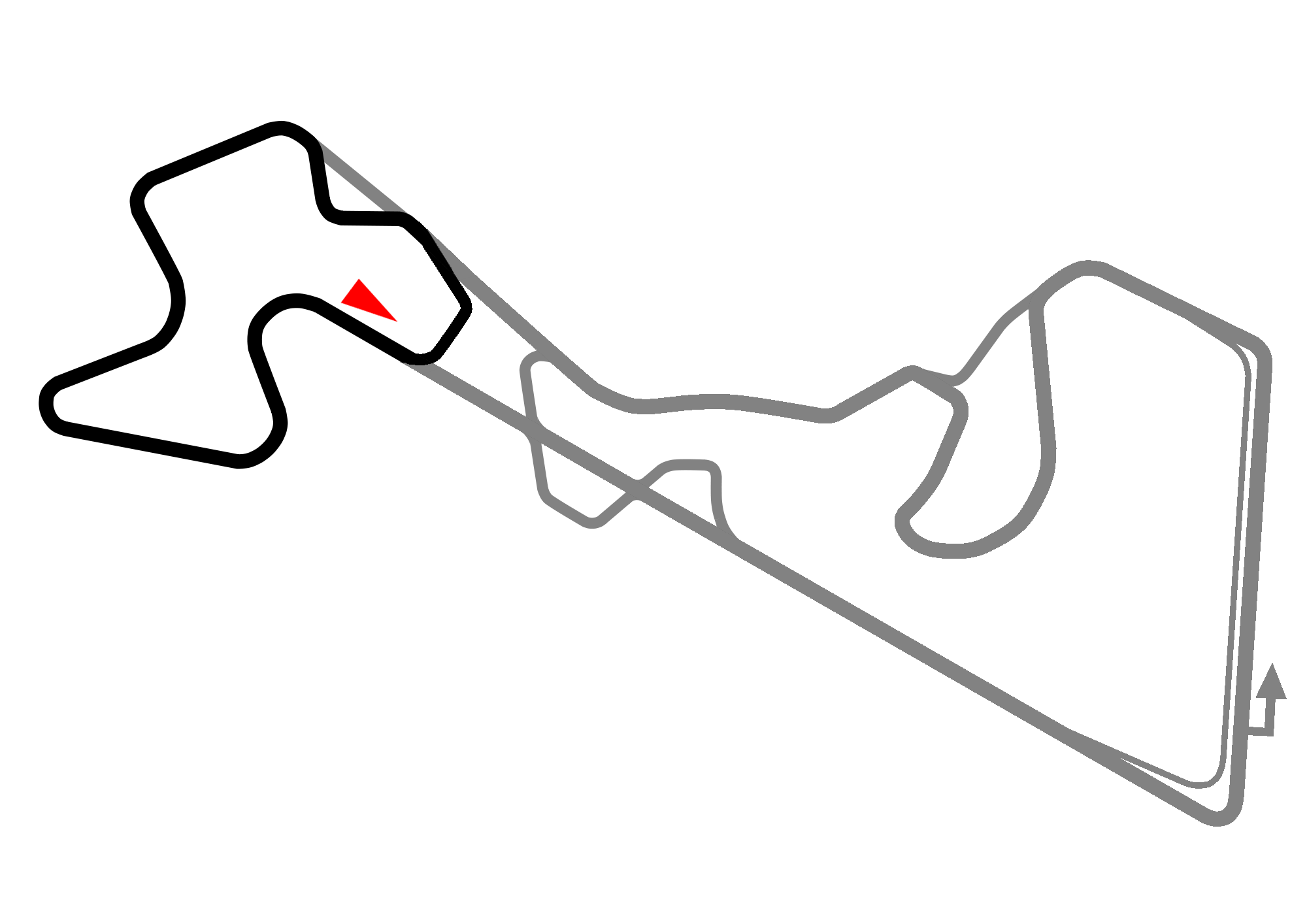
"SuperSprint #1"

Track	Distance	Corners	Grade
Grand Prix #1	3.955 km (2.458 mi)	15	1
Grand Prix #9	3.931 km (2.443 mi)	13	1
Sprint #4	2.661 km (1.653 mi)	12	2
SuperSprint #1	1.357 km (0.843 mi)	10	3
Full Circuit	4.070 km (2.529 mi)	21	N/A

== Events ==
Current

- May: Russian Circuit Racing Series, SMP F4 Championship, SMP RSKG Endurance, Russian Endurance Challenge
- June: Russian Endurance Challenge
- August: Russian Endurance Challenge
- October: Russian Circuit Racing Series, SMP F4 Championship, SMP RSKG Endurance, Russian Endurance Challenge

Former

- Blancpain GT Series (2015)
- Deutsche Tourenwagen Masters (2013–2017)
- Eurocup Formula Renault 2.0 (2012–2014)
- Eurocup Mégane Trophy (2012–2013)
- FIA Formula 3 European Championship (2014)
- FIA GT1 World Championship (2012)
- FIA GT3 European Championship (2012)
- Formula Masters Russia (2012–2015)
- Formula Renault 3.5 Series (2012–2014)
- Superbike World Championship (2012–2013)
- Supersport World Championship (2012–2013)
- World Touring Car Championship
  - FIA WTCC Race of Russia (2013–2016)

== Lap records ==
As of August 2025, the fastest official race lap records at the Moscow Raceway are listed as:

Category	Time	Driver	Vehicle	Event
Grand Prix #9 Circuit (2012–present): 3.931 km (2.443 mi)
Formula Renault 3.5	1:21.686	Stoffel Vandoorne	Dallara T12	2013 Moscow Formula Renault 3.5 Series round
DTM	1:28.305	Miguel Molina	Audi RS5 DTM	2014 Moscow DTM round
Formula Three	1:28.623	Esteban Ocon	Dallara F312	2014 Moscow F3 European Championship round
Group CN	1:31.099	Vitaly Petrov	BR Engineering BR03	2025 2nd Moscow RSKG Endurance round
Formula Renault 2.0	1:32.535	Egor Orudzhev	Tatuus FR2.0/13	2014 Moscow Eurocup Formula Renault 2.0 round
Formula Abarth	1:35.001	Denis Korneev	Tatuus FA010	2014 1st Moscow Formula Russia round
World SBK	1:35.299	Chaz Davies	BMW S1000RR	2013 Moscow World SBK round
Formula 4	1:35.928	Richard Verschoor	Tatuus F4-T014	2016 Moscow SMP F4 round
GT4	1:37.345	Nikita Silaev	Mercedes-AMG GT4	2025 2nd Moscow RCRS round
World SSP	1:38.167	Jules Cluzel	Honda CBR600RR	2012 Moscow World SSP round
Eurocup Mégane Trophy	1:38.733	Mirko Bortolotti	Renault Mégane Renault Sport II	2013 Moscow Eurocup Mégane Trophy round
TC1	1:40.148	José María López	Citroën C-Elysée WTCC	2014 FIA WTCC Race of Russia
TCR Touring Car	1:41.331	Alexander Smolyar	Cupra León VZ TCR	2025 2nd Moscow RCRS round
Super 2000	1:44.100	Franz Engstler	BMW 320 TC	2014 FIA WTCC Race of Russia
Grand Prix #1 Circuit (2012–present): 3.955 km (2.458 mi)
Formula Renault 3.5	1:24.831	Arthur Pic	Dallara T12	2012 Moscow Formula Renault 3.5 Series round
Formula Renault 2.0	1:35.738	Daniil Kvyat	Barazi-Epsilon FR2.0-10	2012 Moscow Eurocup Formula Renault 2.0 round
GT3	1:37.936	Nicky Catsburg	Lamborghini Gallardo LP 560-4 R-EX	2015 Moscow GT Sprint round
Eurocup Mégane Trophy	1:41.637	Albert Costa	Renault Mégane Renault Sport II	2012 Moscow Eurocup Mégane Trophy round
Sprint #4 Circuit (2012–present): 2.545 km (1.581 mi)
DTM	0:58.999	Adrien Tambay	Audi RS5 DTM	2013 Moscow DTM round

== Fatalities ==
- Andrea Antonelli - 2013 Supersport World Championship

== See also ==
- Autodrom Moscow
