= 2012 FIM Superstock 1000 Cup =

2012 FIM Superstock 1000 Cup
Previous:	2011	Next:	2013
Support series: Superbike World Championship; Supersport World Championship; European Superstock 600 Championship; European Junior Cup

The 2012 FIM Superstock 1000 Cup was the fourteenth season of the FIM Superstock 1000 Cup, the eighth held under this name. The FIM Superstock 1000 championship followed the same calendar as the Superbike World Championship, with the exception that it did not venture outside of Europe, leaving the schedule at ten rounds.

== Race calendar and results ==
Round	Country	Circuit	Date	Pole position	Fastest lap	Winning rider	Winning team	Report
1	Italy	Autodromo Enzo e Dino Ferrari	1 April	(Italy) Eddi La Marra	(France) Sylvain Barrier	(France) Sylvain Barrier	BMW Motorrad Italia GoldBet	Report
2	Netherlands	TT Circuit Assen	22 April	(France) Sylvain Barrier	(France) Sylvain Barrier	(France) Sylvain Barrier	BMW Motorrad Italia GoldBet	Report
3	Italy	Autodromo Nazionale Monza	6 May	(France) Sylvain Barrier	(Italy) Fabio Massei	(Italy) Lorenzo Savadori	Barni Racing Team Italia	Report
4	San Marino	Misano World Circuit	10 June	(Italy) Eddi La Marra	(Italy) Lorenzo Baroni	(France) Sylvain Barrier	BMW Motorrad Italia GoldBet	Report
5	Spain	Motorland Aragón	1 July	(France) Sylvain Barrier	(Australia) Bryan Staring	(Australia) Bryan Staring	Team Pedercini	Report
6	Czech Republic	Masaryk Circuit	22 July	(France) Sylvain Barrier	(United Kingdom) Robbie Brown	(Australia) Bryan Staring	Team Pedercini	Report
7	United Kingdom	Silverstone Circuit	5 August	(France) Sylvain Barrier	(Italy) Eddi La Marra	(Italy) Eddi La Marra	Barni Racing Team Italia	Report
8	Germany	Nürburgring	9 September	(Australia) Bryan Staring	(France) Sylvain Barrier	(France) Sylvain Barrier	BMW Motorrad Italia GoldBet	Report
9	Portugal	Autódromo Internacional do Algarve	23 September	(France) Sylvain Barrier	(France) Jérémy Guarnoni	(Australia) Bryan Staring	Team Pedercini	Report
10	France	Circuit de Nevers Magny-Cours	7 October	(France) Sylvain Barrier	(France) Sylvain Barrier	(France) Jérémy Guarnoni	MRS	Report

== Entry list ==
- A provisional entry list was released by the Fédération Internationale de Motocyclisme on 13 February 2012.

2012 entry list
Team	Constructor	Motorcycle	No.	Rider	Rounds
M.V. Racing Team	Aprilia	Aprilia RSV4 APRC	88	(Italy) Massimo Parziani	1–8, 10
Racing Team Gabrielli	Aprilia	Aprilia RSV4 APRC	22	(Italy) Matteo Gabrielli	3–4
Racing Team Gabrielli	Aprilia	Aprilia RSV4 APRC	41	(Italy) Tommaso Gabrielli	3–4
Team Riviera	Aprilia	Aprilia RSV4 APRC	44	(Italy) Federico Dittadi	1, 3–4
Red Devils Roma	Ducati	Ducati 1098R	37	(Poland) Andrzej Chmielewski	All
SK Energy – Bogdanka Racing	Ducati	Ducati 1098R	16	(Poland) Artur Wielebski	9
SK Energy Racing Team	Ducati	Ducati 1098R	5	(Italy) Marco Bussolotti	1–8
SK Energy Racing Team	Ducati	Ducati 1098R	55	(Slovakia) Tomáš Svitok	All
SK Energy Racing Team	Ducati	Ducati 1098R	69	(Czech Republic) Ondřej Ježek	3–8
SK Energy Racing Team	Ducati	Ducati 1098R	69	(Czech Republic) Ondřej Ježek	9–10
Althea Racing	Ducati	Ducati 1199 Panigale	23	(Italy) Federico Sandi	1–2
Barni Racing Team Italia	Ducati	Ducati 1199 Panigale	32	(Italy) Lorenzo Savadori	All
Barni Racing Team Italia	Ducati	Ducati 1199 Panigale	47	(Italy) Eddi La Marra	All
CNS Motorsport	Ducati	Ducati 1199 Panigale	96	(Spain) Enrique Ferrer	5
DMC Racing	Ducati	Ducati 1199 Panigale	24	(United Kingdom) Kev Coghlan	1–2, 4–9
DMC Racing	Ducati	Ducati 1199 Panigale	34	(United Kingdom) Robbie Brown	6–7
DMC Racing	Ducati	Ducati 1199 Panigale	61	(Russia) Alexey Ivanov	1–4, 9
Triple M Racing	Ducati	Ducati 1199 Panigale	12	(Germany) Marc Moser	10
BMW Motorrad Italia GoldBet	BMW	BMW S1000RR	14	(Italy) Lorenzo Baroni	1–7
BMW Motorrad Italia GoldBet	BMW	BMW S1000RR	20	(France) Sylvain Barrier	All
BMW Motorrad Italia GoldBet	BMW	BMW S1000RR	43	(South Africa) Greg Gildenhuys	10
Dream Team Company	BMW	BMW S1000RR	74	(Luxembourg) Chris von Roesgen	8
G.M Racing	BMW	BMW S1000RR	119	(Italy) Michele Magnoni	4
Motomarket Racing	BMW	BMW S1000RR	19	(Finland) Eeki Kuparinen	6, 8
Play Racing Team	BMW	BMW S1000RR	89	(Italy) Domenico Colucci	4
Team Alpha Racing	BMW	BMW S1000RR	21	(Germany) Markus Reiterberger	All
Techno Team	BMW	BMW S1000RR	91	(Italy) Riccardo Fusco	4
Wilbers-BMW-Racing	BMW	BMW S1000RR	3	(Germany) Lucy Glöckner	8
EAB Ten Kate Junior Team	Honda	Honda CBR1000RR	15	(Italy) Fabio Massei	All
MetalCom-Adrenalin H-Moto	Honda	Honda CBR1000RR	40	(Hungary) Alen Győrfi	1–8, 10
Berclaz Racing Team	Kawasaki	Kawasaki Ninja ZX-10R	99	(Switzerland) Gabriel Berclaz	10
BWG Racing Kawasaki	Kawasaki	Kawasaki Ninja ZX-10R	71	(Sweden) Christoffer Bergman	All
CSM Bucharest	Kawasaki	Kawasaki Ninja ZX-10R	30	(Romania) Bogdan Vrăjitoru	1–9
FP Racing	Kawasaki	Kawasaki Ninja ZX-10R	27	(France) Adrien Protat	5–6, 10
Jan Halbich	Kawasaki	Kawasaki Ninja ZX-10R	26	(Czech Republic) Jan Halbich	4, 6
Kawasaki PL Racing	Kawasaki	Kawasaki Ninja ZX-10R	50	(Argentina) Marco Solorza	9
Kawasaki PL Racing	Kawasaki	Kawasaki Ninja ZX-10R	51	(Spain) Santiago Barragán	9
MRS	Kawasaki	Kawasaki Ninja ZX-10R	11	(France) Jérémy Guarnoni	4–10
MRS	Kawasaki	Kawasaki Ninja ZX-10R	65	(France) Loris Baz	1–3
MRS	Kawasaki	Kawasaki Ninja ZX-10R	169	(South Africa) David McFadden	9–10
Team ASPI	Kawasaki	Kawasaki Ninja ZX-10R	93	(France) Matthieu Lussiana	All
Team Brazil by ASPI	Kawasaki	Kawasaki Ninja ZX-10R	17	(Brazil) Danilo Lewis da Silva	2–3
Team Brazil by ASPI	Kawasaki	Kawasaki Ninja ZX-10R	36	(Brazil) Philippe Thiriet	All
Team Brazil by ASPI	Kawasaki	Kawasaki Ninja ZX-10R	42	(Brazil) Heber Pedrosa	1, 5–10
Team Dias	Kawasaki	Kawasaki Ninja ZX-10R	155	(Portugal) Tiago Dias	1–6, 9–10
Team OGP	Kawasaki	Kawasaki Ninja ZX-10R	39	(France) Randy Pagaud	1–8, 10
Team Pedercini	Kawasaki	Kawasaki Ninja ZX-10R	11	(France) Jérémy Guarnoni	1–3
Team Pedercini	Kawasaki	Kawasaki Ninja ZX-10R	67	(Australia) Bryan Staring	All
Team Pedercini	Kawasaki	Kawasaki Ninja ZX-10R	92	(Argentina) Leandro Mercado	7–10
Team Pedercini	Kawasaki	Kawasaki Ninja ZX-10R	169	(South Africa) David McFadden	4–6
Team Pedercini	Kawasaki	Kawasaki Ninja ZX-10R	222	(South Africa) Nicolaas Grobler	10
UP Racing	Kawasaki	Kawasaki Ninja ZX-10R	25	(France) Julien Millet	10
EdgeZone Racing	Suzuki	Suzuki GSX-R1000	98	(Sweden) Lukas Ockelfelt	9
Team 3	Suzuki	Suzuki GSX-R1000	8	(Italy) Federico Mandatori	4

Key
Regular rider
Wildcard rider
Replacement rider

- All entries used Pirelli tyres.

== Championship standings ==
=== Riders' standings ===
Pos.	Rider	Bike	ITA (Italy)	NED (Netherlands)	ITA (Italy)	RSM (San Marino)	SPA (Spain)	CZE (Czech Republic)	GBR (United Kingdom)	GER (Germany)	POR (Portugal)	FRA (France)	Pts
1	(France) Sylvain Barrier	BMW	1	**1**	**Ret**	1	**Ret**	**Ret**	**4**	1	**2**	**2**	153
2	(Italy) Eddi La Marra	Ducati	**3**	3	3	**4**	4	2	1	Ret	5	Ret	130
3	(France) Jérémy Guarnoni	Kawasaki	DNS	7	9	6	2	3	2	Ret	3	1	123
4	(Australia) Bryan Staring	Kawasaki	5	Ret	DNS	7	1	1	3	**Ret**	1	5	122
5	(Italy) Lorenzo Savadori	Ducati	8	2	1	5	13	17	Ret	5	4	3	107
6	(Germany) Markus Reiterberger	BMW	4	4	7	10	5	13	9	3	9	10	91
7	(Sweden) Christoffer Bergman	Kawasaki	Ret	8	2	11	9	7	6	7	6	6	88
8	(Italy) Fabio Massei	Honda	6	Ret	4	9	10	6	10	6	7	Ret	71
9	(United Kingdom) Kev Coghlan	Ducati	7	11	WD	8	6	11	5	2	Ret		68
10	(Italy) Lorenzo Baroni	BMW	15	5	8	2	3	Ret	DNS				56
11	(Czech Republic) Ondřej Ježek	Ducati			Ret	13	11	8	7	8	10	7	48
12	(France) Matthieu Lussiana	Kawasaki	DNS	10	13	27	Ret	9	Ret	10	Ret	4	35
13	(Italy) Marco Bussolotti	Ducati	Ret	9	5	Ret	7	16	Ret	9			34
14	(France) Loris Baz	Kawasaki	2	6	Ret								30
15	(Argentina) Leandro Mercado	Kawasaki							8	4	8	Ret	29
16	(Hungary) Alen Győrfi	Honda	12	Ret	6	22	14	14	12	11		Ret	27
17	(South Africa) David McFadden	Kawasaki				Ret	8	5			12	Ret	23
18	(France) Randy Pagaud	Kawasaki	DNS	12	14	25	16	18	13	13		9	19
19	(Poland) Andrzej Chmielewski	Ducati	10	13	Ret	16	Ret	10	14	14	Ret	Ret	19
20	(United Kingdom) Robbie Brown	Ducati						4	11				18
21	(Italy) Michele Magnoni	BMW				3							16
22	(Slovakia) Tomáš Svitok	Ducati	9	DNS	12	Ret	Ret	21	Ret	12	Ret	Ret	15
23	(Italy) Federico Dittadi	Aprilia	11		10	12							15
24	(Brazil) Philippe Thiriet	Kawasaki	14	14	16	14	18	22	16	15	13	16	10
25	(France) Julien Millet	Kawasaki										8	8
26	(Italy) Massimo Parziani	Aprilia	Ret	Ret	17	20	17	15	15	17		11	7
27	(Portugal) Tiago Dias	Kawasaki	13	Ret	19	21	15	19			14	15	7
28	(Spain) Santiago Barragán	Kawasaki									11		5
29	(Italy) Matteo Gabrielli	Aprilia			11	18							5
30	(France) Adrien Protat	Kawasaki					20	20				12	4
31	(Czech Republic) Jan Halbich	Kawasaki				19		12					4
32	(Spain) Enrique Ferrer	Ducati					12						4
33	(Brazil) Heber Pedrosa	Kawasaki	Ret				21	24	17	16	15	13	4
34	(Switzerland) Gabriel Berclaz	Kawasaki										14	2
35	(Italy) Tommaso Gabrielli	Aprilia			Ret	15							1
36	(Romania) Bogdan Vrăjitoru	Kawasaki	DNQ	NC	15	26	19	23	DNQ	18	19		1
37	(Brazil) Danilo Lewis da Silva	Kawasaki		15	20								1
	(Argentina) Marco Solorza	Kawasaki									16		0
	(Italy) Domenico Colucci	BMW				17							0
	(Poland) Artur Wielebski	Honda									17		0
	(Russia) Alexey Ivanov	Ducati	DNQ	DNQ	18	DNS					18		0
	(Luxembourg) Chris von Roesgen	BMW								19			0
	(Italy) Federico Mandatori	Suzuki				23							0
	(Italy) Riccardo Fusco	BMW				24							0
	(Italy) Federico Sandi	Ducati	DNS	Ret									0
	(Finland) Eeki Kuparinen	BMW						DNS		Ret			0
	(Germany) Lucy Glöckner	BMW								Ret			0
	(Sweden) Lukas Ockelfelt	Suzuki									Ret		0
	(South Africa) Greg Gildenhuys	BMW										Ret	0
	(South Africa) Nicolaas Grobler	Kawasaki										Ret	0
	(Germany) Marc Moser	Ducati										DNS	0
Pos.	Rider	Bike	ITA (Italy)	NED (Netherlands)	ITA (Italy)	RSM (San Marino)	SPA (Spain)	CZE (Czech Republic)	GBR (United Kingdom)	GER (Germany)	POR (Portugal)	FRA (France)	Pts

Colour	Result
Gold	Winner
Silver	Second place
Bronze	Third place
Green	Points classification
Blue	Non-points classification
Blue	Non-classified finish (NC)
Purple	Retired, not classified (Ret)
Red	Did not qualify (DNQ)
Red	Did not pre-qualify (DNPQ)
Black	Disqualified (DSQ)
White	Did not start (DNS)
White	Withdrew (WD)
White	Race cancelled (C)
Blank	Did not practice (DNP)
Blank	Did not arrive (DNA)
Blank	Excluded (EX)

**Bold** – Pole position
Italics – Fastest lap

=== Manufacturers' standings ===
Pos.	Manufacturer	ITA (Italy)	NED (Netherlands)	ITA (Italy)	SMR (San Marino)	SPA (Spain)	CZE (Czech Republic)	GBR (United Kingdom)	GER (Germany)	POR (Portugal)	FRA (France)	Pts
1	(Japan) Kawasaki	2	6	2	6	1	1	2	4	1	1	193
2	(Germany) BMW	1	1	7	1	3	13	4	1	2	2	181
3	(Italy) Ducati	3	2	1	4	4	2	1	2	4	3	181
4	(Japan) Honda	6	Ret	4	9	10	6	10	6	7	Ret	71
5	(Italy) Aprilia	11	Ret	10	12	17	15	15	17		11	22
	(Japan) Suzuki				23					Ret		0
Pos.	Manufacturer	ITA (Italy)	NED (Netherlands)	ITA (Italy)	SMR (San Marino)	SPA (Spain)	CZE (Czech Republic)	GBR (United Kingdom)	GER (Germany)	POR (Portugal)	FRA (France)	Pts
