= 2012 Nürburgring Superbike World Championship round =

(Germany) 2012 Nürburgring Superbike World Championship round
Round details
- Round 12 of 14 rounds in the 2012 Superbike World Championship. and Round 11 of 13 rounds in the 2012 Supersport World Championship.
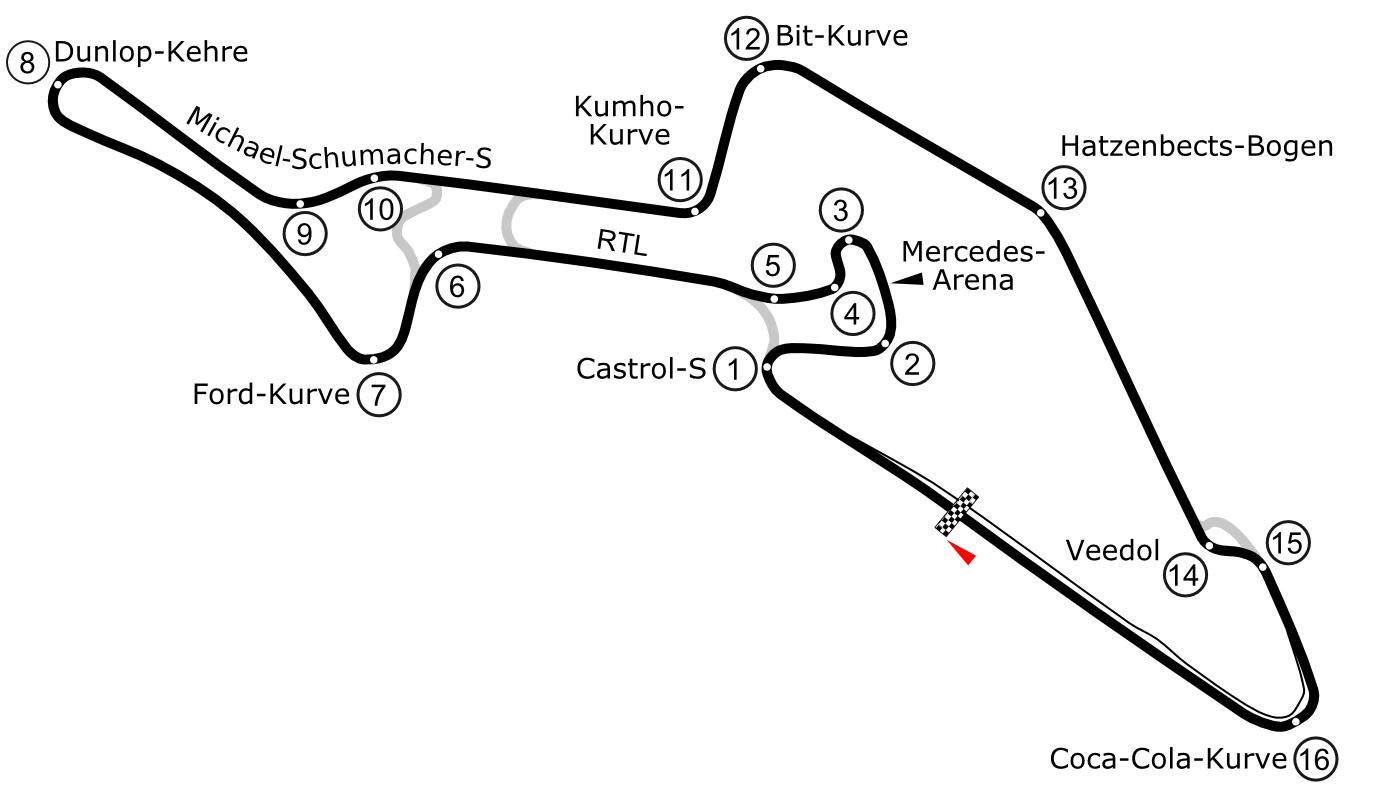
- Date: 9 September, 2012
- Location: Nürburgring
- Course: Permanent racing facility 5.137 km (3.192 mi)

Superbike World Championship
Pole position
(Italy) Max Biaggi
1:53.855
Fastest lap race 1	Fastest lap race 2
(Italy) Max Biaggi	(Spain) Carlos Checa
1:55.267	1:56.148

Supersport World Championship
Pole position
(France) Jules Cluzel
1:59.201
Fastest lap
(United Kingdom) Sam Lowes
2:00.222

The 2012 Nürburgring Superbike World Championship round was the twelfth round of the 2012 Superbike World Championship. It took place over the weekend of 7–9 September 2012 at the Nürburgring located in Nürburg, Germany.

== Superbike ==
=== Race 1 classification ===
Pos	No.	Rider	Bike	Laps	Time	Grid	Points
1	3	(Italy) Max Biaggi	Aprilia RSV4 Factory	20	38:52.751	1	25
2	58	(Republic of Ireland) Eugene Laverty	Aprilia RSV4 Factory	20	+3.027	4	20
3	19	(United Kingdom) Chaz Davies	Aprilia RSV4 Factory	20	+3.127	10	16
4	66	(United Kingdom) Tom Sykes	Kawasaki ZX-10R	20	+12.306	2	13
5	2	(United Kingdom) Leon Camier	Suzuki GSX-R1000	20	+14.131	7	11
6	50	(France) Sylvain Guintoli	Ducati 1098R	20	+19.523	16	10
7	91	(United Kingdom) Leon Haslam	BMW S1000RR	20	+27.017	12	9
8	87	(Italy) Lorenzo Zanetti	Ducati 1098R	20	+33.116	11	8
9	86	(Italy) Ayrton Badovini	BMW S1000RR	20	+34.937	15	7
10	4	(Japan) Hiroshi Aoyama	Honda CBR1000RR	20	+39.132	17	6
11	121	(France) Maxime Berger	Ducati 1098R	20	+41.000	19	5
12	7	(Spain) Carlos Checa	Ducati 1098R	20	+41.125	6	4
13	21	(United States) John Hopkins	Suzuki GSX-R1000	20	+46.925	14	3
14	57	(Italy) Lorenzo Lanzi	Ducati 1098R	20	+54.659	18	2
15	68	(Canada) Brett McCormick	Ducati 1098R	20	+56.342	20	1
16	5	(Sweden) Alexander Lundh	Kawasaki ZX-10R	20	+1:09.730	21	
17	64	(Italy) Norino Brignola	BMW S1000RR	20	+1:43.679	22	
Ret	76	(France) Loris Baz	Kawasaki ZX-10R	17	Accident	8	
Ret	33	(Italy) Marco Melandri	BMW S1000RR	5	Accident	3	
Ret	34	(Italy) Davide Giugliano	Ducati 1098R	3	Accident	9	
Ret	65	(United Kingdom) Jonathan Rea	Honda CBR1000RR	2	Accident	5	
Ret	84	(Italy) Michel Fabrizio	BMW S1000RR	0	Accident	13	
DNS	59	(Italy) Niccolò Canepa	Ducati 1098R		Did not start		
DNS	44	(Spain) David Salom	Kawasaki ZX-10R		Did not start		
Report:

=== Race 2 classification ===
Pos	No.	Rider	Bike	Laps	Time	Grid	Points
1	19	(United Kingdom) Chaz Davies	Aprilia RSV4 Factory	20	39:00.327	10	25
2	58	(Republic of Ireland) Eugene Laverty	Aprilia RSV4 Factory	20	+3.022	4	20
3	2	(United Kingdom) Leon Camier	Suzuki GSX-R1000	20	+3.222	7	16
4	65	(United Kingdom) Jonathan Rea	Honda CBR1000RR	20	+5.705	5	13
5	66	(United Kingdom) Tom Sykes	Kawasaki ZX-10R	20	+7.304	2	11
6	7	(Spain) Carlos Checa	Ducati 1098R	20	+7.541	6	10
7	34	(Italy) Davide Giugliano	Ducati 1098R	20	+14.709	9	9
8	76	(France) Loris Baz	Kawasaki ZX-10R	20	+19.782	8	8
9	86	(Italy) Ayrton Badovini	BMW S1000RR	20	+19.925	15	7
10	50	(France) Sylvain Guintoli	Ducati 1098R	20	+20.028	16	6
11	87	(Italy) Lorenzo Zanetti	Ducati 1098R	20	+25.653	11	5
12	21	(United States) John Hopkins	Suzuki GSX-R1000	20	+29.142	14	4
13	3	(Italy) Max Biaggi	Aprilia RSV4 Factory	20	+29.579	1	3
14	121	(France) Maxime Berger	Ducati 1098R	20	+36.090	19	2
15	4	(Japan) Hiroshi Aoyama	Honda CBR1000RR	20	+40.912	17	1
16	57	(Italy) Lorenzo Lanzi	Ducati 1098R	20	+50.401	18	
17	64	(Italy) Norino Brignola	BMW S1000RR	17	+3 lap	22	
Ret	68	(Canada) Brett McCormick	Ducati 1098R	15	Retirement	20	
Ret	91	(United Kingdom) Leon Haslam	BMW S1000RR	9	Accident	12	
Ret	33	(Italy) Marco Melandri	BMW S1000RR	8	Accident	3	
Ret	84	(Italy) Michel Fabrizio	BMW S1000RR	8	Retirement	13	
Ret	5	(Sweden) Alexander Lundh	Kawasaki ZX-10R	6	Retirement	21	
DNS	59	(Italy) Niccolò Canepa	Ducati 1098R		Did not start		
DNS	44	(Spain) David Salom	Kawasaki ZX-10R		Did not start		
Report:

== Supersport ==
=== Race classification ===
Pos	No.	Rider	Bike	Laps	Time	Grid	Points
1	54	(Turkey) Kenan Sofuoğlu	Kawasaki ZX-6R	19	38:13.709	4	25
2	16	(France) Jules Cluzel	Honda CBR600RR	19	+0.541	1	20
3	99	(France) Fabien Foret	Kawasaki ZX-6R	19	+6.258	5	16
4	23	(Australia) Broc Parkes	Honda CBR600RR	19	+10.345	3	13
5	25	(Italy) Alex Baldolini	Triumph Daytona 675	19	+18.303	10	11
6	14	(Hungary) Gábor Talmácsi	Honda CBR600RR	19	+22.366	7	10
7	31	(Italy) Vittorio Iannuzzo	Triumph Daytona 675	19	+27.230	20	9
8	37	(Austria) David Linortner	Yamaha YZF-R6	19	+33.213	16	8
9	34	(South Africa) Ronan Quarmby	Honda CBR600RR	19	+33.526	12	7
10	55	(Italy) Massimo Roccoli	Yamaha YZF-R6	19	+35.932	14	6
11	98	(France) Romain Lanusse	Kawasaki ZX-6R	19	+36.146	22	5
12	93	(France) Florian Marino	Kawasaki ZX-6R	19	+39.446	18	4
13	11	(United Kingdom) Sam Lowes	Honda CBR600RR	19	+41.099	2	3
14	8	(Italy) Andrea Antonelli	Yamaha YZF-R6	19	+47.345	26	2
15	3	(Australia) Jed Metcher	Yamaha YZF-R6	19	+47.477	21	1
16	117	(Portugal) Miguel Praia	Honda CBR600RR	19	+47.865	25	
17	38	(Hungary) Balázs Németh	Honda CBR600RR	19	+48.190	27	
18	13	(Italy) Dino Lombardi	Honda CBR600RR	19	+55.295	24	
19	40	(United Kingdom) Martin Jessopp	Honda CBR600RR	19	+1:10.222	29	
20	10	(Hungary) Imre Tóth	Honda CBR600RR	19	+1:10.796	11	
21	2	(Netherlands) Leon Bovee	Yamaha YZF-R6	19	+1:22.093	15	
22	125	(Italy) Danilo Marrancone	Honda CBR600RR	19	+1:22.437	28	
23	15	(Germany) Luca Hansen	Honda CBR600RR	19	+1:25.483	30	
24	33	(Austria) Yves Polzer	Yamaha YZF-R6	19	+1:46.818	31	
DSQ	65	(Russia) Vladimir Leonov	Yamaha YZF-R6	19	(+17.851)	6	
Ret	87	(Italy) Luca Marconi	Yamaha YZF-R6	17	Retirement	23	
Ret	22	(Italy) Roberto Tamburini	Honda CBR600RR	9	Accident	9	
Ret	32	(South Africa) Sheridan Morais	Kawasaki ZX-6R	5	Retirement	8	
Ret	4	(United Kingdom) Dan Linfoot	Kawasaki ZX-6R	4	Accident	13	
Ret	24	(Russia) Eduard Blokhin	Yamaha YZF-R6	4	Retirement	32	
Ret	20	(South Africa) Matthew Scholtz	Honda CBR600RR	0	Accident	17	
Ret	61	(Italy) Fabio Menghi	Yamaha YZF-R6	0	Accident	19	
DNS	64	(United States) Josh Day	Kawasaki ZX-6R		Did not start		
Report:

== Superstock ==
=== STK1000 race classification ===
Pos	No.	Rider	Bike	Laps	Time	Grid	Points
1	20	(France) Sylvain Barrier	BMW S1000RR	11	21:56.069	3	25
2	24	(United Kingdom) Kev Coghlan	Ducati 1199 Panigale	11	+11.212	5	20
3	21	(Germany) Markus Reiterberger	BMW S1000RR	11	+13.096	6	16
4	92	(Argentina) Leandro Mercado	Kawasaki ZX-10R	11	+14.954	7	13
5	32	(Italy) Lorenzo Savadori	Ducati 1199 Panigale	11	+15.775	12	11
6	15	(Italy) Fabio Massei	Honda CBR1000RR	11	+16.757	8	10
7	71	(Sweden) Christoffer Bergman	Kawasaki ZX-10R	11	+20.619	9	9
8	69	(Czech Republic) Ondřej Ježek	Ducati 1098R	11	+21.972	10	8
9	5	(Italy) Marco Bussolotti	Ducati 1098R	11	+22.043	11	7
10	93	(France) Mathieu Lussiana	Kawasaki ZX-10R	11	+22.358	13	6
11	40	(Hungary) Alen Győrfi	Honda CBR1000RR	11	+39.922	14	5
12	55	(Slovakia) Tomáš Svitok	Ducati 1098R	11	+40.100	15	4
13	39	(France) Randy Pagaud	Kawasaki ZX-10R	11	+41.199	18	3
14	37	(Poland) Andrzej Chmielewski	Ducati 1098R	11	+44.939	16	2
15	36	(Brazil) Philippe Thiriet	Kawasaki ZX-10R	11	+45.582	22	1
16	42	(Brazil) Heber Pedrosa	Kawasaki ZX-10R	11	+46.355	20	
17	88	(Italy) Massimo Parziani	Aprilia RSV4 APRC	11	+1:01.441	21	
18	30	(Romania) Bogdan Vrăjitoru	Kawasaki ZX-10R	11	+1:26.089	23	
19	74	(Luxembourg) Chris Von Roesgen	BMW S1000RR	11	+1:56.967	24	
Ret	67	(Australia) Bryan Staring	Kawasaki ZX-10R	9	Retirement	1	
Ret	19	(Finland) Eeki Kuparinen	BMW S1000RR	8	Accident	19	
Ret	11	(France) Jérémy Guarnoni	Kawasaki ZX-10R	7	Accident	4	
Ret	47	(Italy) Eddi La Marra	Ducati 1199 Panigale	5	Retirement	2	
Ret	3	(Germany) Lucy Glöckner	BMW S1000RR	1	Accident	17	
Report:
