= 2012 Brno Superbike World Championship round =

(Czech Republic) 2012 Brno Superbike World Championship round
Round details
- Round 9 of 14 rounds in the 2012 Superbike World Championship. and Round 8 of 13 rounds in the 2012 Supersport World Championship.
- Date: 22 July, 2012
- Location: Brno
- Course: Permanent racing facility 5.403 km (3.357 mi)

Superbike World Championship
Pole position
(United Kingdom) Tom Sykes
1:58.010
Fastest lap race 1	Fastest lap race 2
(Spain) Carlos Checa	(United Kingdom) Tom Sykes
2:00.741	1:59.728

Supersport World Championship
Pole position
(Turkey) Kenan Sofuoğlu
2:03.217
Fastest lap
(Australia) Broc Parkes
2:04.011

The 2012 Brno Superbike World Championship round was the ninth round of the 2012 Superbike World Championship. It took place over the weekend of 20–22 July 2012 at the Brno Circuit located in Brno, Czech Republic.

== Superbike ==
=== Race 1 classification ===
Pos	No.	Rider	Bike	Laps	Time	Grid	Points
1	33	(Italy) Marco Melandri	BMW S1000RR	20	41:59.808	5	25
2	66	(United Kingdom) Tom Sykes	Kawasaki ZX-10R	20	+1.360	1	20
3	76	(France) Loris Baz	Kawasaki ZX-10R	20	+1.948	15	16
4	7	(Spain) Carlos Checa	Ducati 1098R	20	+2.494	2	13
5	58	(Republic of Ireland) Eugene Laverty	Aprilia RSV4 Factory	20	+3.832	3	11
6	3	(Italy) Max Biaggi	Aprilia RSV4 Factory	20	+7.139	14	10
7	91	(United Kingdom) Leon Haslam	BMW S1000RR	20	+11.293	7	9
8	84	(Italy) Michel Fabrizio	BMW S1000RR	20	+11.945	8	8
9	121	(France) Maxime Berger	Ducati 1098R	20	+18.988	19	7
10	96	(Czech Republic) Jakub Smrž	Ducati 1098R	20	+19.117	10	6
11	19	(United Kingdom) Chaz Davies	Aprilia RSV4 Factory	20	+22.938	9	5
12	53	(Italy) Alessandro Polita	Ducati 1098R	20	+1:05.646	20	4
13	64	(Italy) Norino Brignola	BMW S1000RR	20	+1:05.733	22	3
14	2	(United Kingdom) Leon Camier	Suzuki GSX-R1000	20	+1:08.248	13	2
15	21	(United States) John Hopkins	Suzuki GSX-R1000	20	+1:12.120	16	1
16	87	(Italy) Lorenzo Zanetti	Ducati 1098R	20	+1:13.057	17	
17	13	(Hungary) Viktor Kispataki	Honda CBR1000RR	17	+3 lap	23	
18	44	(Spain) David Salom	Kawasaki ZX-10R	17	+3 lap	11	
Ret	65	(United Kingdom) Jonathan Rea	Honda CBR1000RR	18	Accident	6	
Ret	36	(Argentina) Leandro Mercado	Kawasaki ZX-10R	10	Accident	21	
Ret	4	(Japan) Hiroshi Aoyama	Honda CBR1000RR	10	Accident	18	
Ret	34	(Italy) Davide Giugliano	Ducati 1098R	4	Retirement	4	
Ret	86	(Italy) Ayrton Badovini	BMW S1000RR	0	Accident	12	
Report:

=== Race 2 classification ===
Pos	No.	Rider	Bike	Laps	Time	Grid	Points
1	33	(Italy) Marco Melandri	BMW S1000RR	20	40:12.837	5	25
2	66	(United Kingdom) Tom Sykes	Kawasaki ZX-10R	20	+0.140	1	20
3	7	(Spain) Carlos Checa	Ducati 1098R	20	+6.801	2	16
4	3	(Italy) Max Biaggi	Aprilia RSV4 Factory	20	+9.840	14	13
5	58	(Republic of Ireland) Eugene Laverty	Aprilia RSV4 Factory	20	+11.775	3	11
6	19	(United Kingdom) Chaz Davies	Aprilia RSV4 Factory	20	+11.950	9	10
7	91	(United Kingdom) Leon Haslam	BMW S1000RR	20	+12.547	7	9
8	76	(France) Loris Baz	Kawasaki ZX-10R	20	+13.088	15	8
9	2	(United Kingdom) Leon Camier	Suzuki GSX-R1000	20	+18.141	13	7
10	84	(Italy) Michel Fabrizio	BMW S1000RR	20	+25.332	8	6
11	34	(Italy) Davide Giugliano	Ducati 1098R	20	+28.458	4	5
12	65	(United Kingdom) Jonathan Rea	Honda CBR1000RR	20	+29.254	6	4
13	96	(Czech Republic) Jakub Smrž	Ducati 1098R	20	+29.513	10	3
14	21	(United States) John Hopkins	Suzuki GSX-R1000	20	+34.875	16	2
15	121	(France) Maxime Berger	Ducati 1098R	20	+41.861	19	1
16	87	(Italy) Lorenzo Zanetti	Ducati 1098R	20	+42.139	17	
18	64	(Italy) Norino Brignola	BMW S1000RR	20	+1:15.743	21	
19	13	(Hungary) Viktor Kispataki	Honda CBR1000RR	20	+1:41.325	22	
20	53	(Italy) Alessandro Polita	Ducati 1098R	10	Retirement	20	
Ret	86	(Italy) Ayrton Badovini	BMW S1000RR	9	Retirement	12	
Ret	44	(Spain) David Salom	Kawasaki ZX-10R	7	Retirement	11	
Ret	4	(Japan) Hiroshi Aoyama	Honda CBR1000RR	4	Retirement	18	
DNS	36	(Argentina) Leandro Mercado	Kawasaki ZX-10R		Did not start		

== Supersport ==
=== Race classification ===
Pos	No.	Rider	Bike	Laps	Time	Grid	Points
1	99	(France) Fabien Foret	Kawasaki ZX-6R	13	27:02.236	3	25
2	54	(Turkey) Kenan Sofuoğlu	Kawasaki ZX-6R	13	+0.128	1	20
3	23	(Australia) Broc Parkes	Honda CBR600RR	13	+0.434	4	16
4	11	(United Kingdom) Sam Lowes	Honda CBR600RR	13	+4.650	5	13
5	16	(France) Jules Cluzel	Honda CBR600RR	13	+7.725	2	11
6	34	(South Africa) Ronan Quarmby	Honda CBR600RR	13	+11.384	7	10
7	32	(South Africa) Sheridan Morais	Kawasaki ZX-6R	13	+11.934	9	9
8	12	(Italy) Stefano Cruciani	Kawasaki ZX-6R	13	+12.253	10	8
9	31	(Italy) Vittorio Iannuzzo	triumph Daytona 675	13	+15.111	6	7
10	65	(Russia) Vladimir Leonov	Yamaha YZF-R6	13	+18.549	14	6
11	98	(France) Romain Lanusse	Kawasaki ZX-6R	13	+18.840	13	5
12	14	(Hungary) Gábor Talmácsi	Honda CBR600RR	13	+19.037	11	4
13	93	(France) Florian Marino	Kawasaki ZX-6R	13	+24.880	23	3
14	53	(France) Valentin Debise	Honda CBR600RR	13	+24.905	12	2
15	87	(Italy) Luca Marconi	Yamaha YZF-R6	13	+32.134	25	1
16	35	(Italy) Raffaele De Rosa	Honda CBR600RR	13	+32.401	21	
17	38	(Hungary) Balázs Németh	Honda CBR600RR	13	+32.696	27	
18	13	(Italy) Dino Lombardi	Yamaha YZF-R6	13	+33.236	28	
19	10	(Hungary) Imre Tóth	Honda CBR600RR	13	+36.772	24	
20	89	(Austria) Stefan Kerschbaumer	Yamaha YZF-R6	13	+41.597	22	
21	61	(Italy) Fabio Menghi	Yamaha YZF-R6	13	+41.886	29	
22	66	(Italy) Andrea Agnelli	Kawasaki ZX-6R	13	+50.403	26	
23	40	(United Kingdom) Martin Jessopp	Honda CBR600RR	13	+1:13.516	31	
24	24	(Russia) Eduard Blokhin	Yamaha YZF-R6	13	+1:28.048	32	
25	73	(Russia) Oleg Pozdneev	Yamaha YZF-R6	13	+2:06.493	34	
Ret	20	(South Africa) Matthew Scholtz	Honda CBR600RR	12	Retirement	19	
Ret	64	(United States) Josh Day	Kawasaki ZX-6R	11	Retirement	15	
Ret	3	(Australia) Jed Metcher	Yamaha YZF-R6	10	Retirement	17	
Ret	22	(Italy) Roberto Tamburini	Honda CBR600RR	9	Accident	16	
Ret	33	(Austria) Yves Polzer	Yamaha YZF-R6	8	Retirement	33	
Ret	55	(Italy) Massimo Roccoli	Honda CBR600RR	4	Retirement	30	
Ret	19	(Poland) Paweł Szkopek	Honda CBR600RR	2	Accident	20	
Ret	25	(Italy) Alex Baldolini	Triumph Daytona 675	1	Retirement	8	
DNS	8	(Italy) Andrea Antonelli	Yamaha YZF-R6	0	Did not start	18	
Report:

== Superstock ==
=== STK1000 race classification ===
Pos	No.	Rider	Bike	Laps	Time	Grid	Points
1	67	(Australia) Bryan Staring	Kawasaki ZX-10R	12	27:22.582	4	25
2	47	(Italy) Eddi La Marra	Ducati 1199 Panigale	12	+6.577	7	20
3	11	(France) Jérémy Guarnoni	Kawasaki ZX-10R	12	+32.390	2	16
4	34	(United Kingdom) Robbie Brown	Ducati 1199 Panigale	12	+34.106	23	13
5	169	(South Africa) David McFadden	Kawasaki ZX-10R	12	+38.007	14	11
6	15	(Italy) Fabio Massei	Honda CBR1000RR	12	+38.412	12	10
7	71	(Sweden) Christoffer Bergman	Kawasaki ZX-10R	12	+39.584	3	9
8	69	(Czech Republic) Ondřej Ježek	Ducati 1098R	12	+39.940	6	8
9	93	(France) Mathieu Lussiana	Kawasaki ZX-10R	12	+40.108	11	7
10	37	(Poland) Andrzej Chmielewski	Ducati 1098R	12	+43.054	17	6
11	24	(United Kingdom) Kev Coghlan	Ducati 1199 Panigale	12	+43.559	9	5
12	26	(Czech Republic) Jan Halbich	Kawasaki ZX-10R	12	+45.207	19	4
13	21	(Germany) Markus Reiterberger	BMW S1000RR	12	+59.482	10	3
14	40	(Hungary) Alen Győrfi	Honda CBR1000RR	12	+1:02.645	15	2
15	88	(Italy) Massimo Parziani	Aprilia RSV4 APRC	12	+1:26.548	22	1
16	5	(Italy) Marco Bussolotti	Ducati 1098R	12	+1:27.037	16	
17	32	(Italy) Lorenzo Savadori	Ducati 1199 Panigale	12	+1:45.415	8	
18	39	(France) Randy Pagaud	Kawasaki ZX-10R	12	+2:02.254	20	
19	155	(Portugal) Tiago Dias	Kawasaki ZX-10R	12	+2:03.161	18	
20	27	(France) Adrien Protat	Kawasaki ZX-10R	12	+2:04.727	26	
21	55	(Slovakia) Tomáš Svitok	Ducati 1098R	12	+2:06.708	13	
22	36	(Brazil) Philippe Thiriet	Kawasaki ZX-10R	12	+2:15.136	21	
23	30	(Romania) Bogdan Vrăjitoru	Kawasaki ZX-10R	11	+1 lap	25	
24	42	(Brazil) Heber Pedrosa	Kawasaki ZX-10R	11	+1 lap	24	
Ret	14	(Italy) Lorenzo Baroni	BMW S1000RR	7	Retirement	5	
Ret	20	(France) Sylvain Barrier	BMW S1000RR	3	Accident	1	
DNS	19	(Finland) Eeki Kuparinen	BMW S1000RR		Did not start		
Report:
