= 2012 Aragon Superbike World Championship round =

(Spain) 2012 Aragón Superbike World Championship round
Round details
- Round 8 of 14 rounds in the 2012 Superbike World Championship. and Round 7 of 13 rounds in the 2012 Supersport World Championship.
- Date: 1 July, 2012
- Location: Aragón
- Course: Permanent racing facility 5.345 km (3.321 mi)

Superbike World Championship
Pole position
(United Kingdom) Tom Sykes
1:56.552
Fastest lap race 1	Fastest lap race 2
(Italy) Marco Melandri	(Italy) Marco Melandri
1:58.251	1:58.950

Supersport World Championship
Pole position
(France) Jules Cluzel
2:02.624
Fastest lap
(South Africa) Sheridan Morais
2:03.300

The 2012 Aragon Superbike World Championship round was the eighth round of the 2012 Superbike World Championship. it took place over the weekend of 29 June–1 July 2012 at the Motorland Aragón located in Alcañiz, Spain.

== Superbike ==
=== Race 1 classification ===
Pos	No.	Rider	Bike	Laps	Time	Grid	Points
1	3	(Italy) Max Biaggi	Aprilia RSV4 Factory	20	39:51.188	2	25
2	33	(Italy) Marco Melandri	BMW S1000RR	20	+0.278	5	20
3	7	(Spain) Carlos Checa	Ducati 1098R	20	+9.462	7	16
4	19	(United Kingdom) Chaz Davies	Aprilia RSV4 Factory	20	+10.827	8	13
5	58	(Republic of Ireland) Eugene Laverty	Aprilia RSV4 Factory	20	+15.708	3	11
6	84	(Italy) Michel Fabrizio	BMW S1000RR	20	+27.597	13	10
7	91	(United Kingdom) Leon Haslam	BMW S1000RR	20	+29.032	4	9
8	34	(Italy) Davide Giugliano	Ducati 1098R	20	+39.374	11	8
9	2	(United Kingdom) Leon Camier	Suzuki GSX-R1000	20	+40.887	14	7
10	121	(France) Maxime Berger	Ducati 1098R	20	+41.440	20	6
11	59	(Italy) Niccolò Canepa	Ducati 1098R	20	+42.056	19	5
12	50	(France) Sylvain Guintoli	Ducati 1098R	20	+42.369	9	4
13	87	(Italy) Lorenzo Zanetti	Ducati 1098R	20	+42.669	16	3
14	4	(Japan) Hiroshi Aoyama	Honda CBR1000RR	20	+48.010	18	2
15	21	(United States) John Hopkins	Suzuki GSX-R1000	20	+49.752	21	1
16	65	(United Kingdom) Jonathan Rea	Honda CBR1000RR	20	+54.590	6	
17	64	(Italy) Norino Brignola	BMW S1000RR	20	+1:59.653	23	
Ret	66	(United Kingdom) Tom Sykes	Kawasaki ZX-10R	19	Accident	1	
Ret	86	(Italy) Ayrton Badovini	BMW S1000RR	19	Accident	10	
Ret	44	(Spain) David Salom	Kawasaki ZX-10R	12	Retirement	17	
Ret	36	(Argentina) Leandro Mercado	Kawasaki ZX-10R	10	Accident	22	
Ret	76	(France) Loris Baz	Kawasaki ZX-10R	8	Retirement	15	
Ret	96	(Czech Republic) Jakub Smrž	Ducati 1098R	0	Accident	12	
Report:

=== Race 2 classification ===
Pos	No.	Rider	Bike	Laps	Time	Grid	Points
1	33	(Italy) Marco Melandri	BMW S1000RR	20	39:59.200	5	25
2	58	(Republic of Ireland) Eugene Laverty	Aprilia RSV4 Factory	20	+0.042	3	20
3	19	(United Kingdom) Chaz Davies	Aprilia RSV4 Factory	20	+0.446	8	16
4	3	(Italy) Max Biaggi	Aprilia RSV4 Factory	20	+0.484	2	13
5	65	(United Kingdom) Jonathan Rea	Honda CBR1000RR	20	+6.611	6	11
6	91	(United Kingdom) Leon Haslam	BMW S1000RR	20	+7.491	4	10
7	7	(Spain) 'Carlos Checa	Ducati 1098R	20	+9.325	7	9
8	66	(United Kingdom) Tom Sykes	Kawasaki ZX-10R	20	+10.444	1	8
9	86	(Italy) Ayrton Badovini	BMW S1000RR	20	+10.828	10	7
10	34	(Italy) Davide Giugliano	Ducati 1098R	20	+10.925	11	6
11	84	(Italy) Michel Fabrizio	BMW S1000RR	20	+21.955	12	5
12	121	(France) Maxime Berger	Ducati 1098R	20	+22.046	19	4
13	50	(France) Sylvain Guintoli	Ducati 1098R	20	+22.486	9	3
14	87	(Italy) Lorenzo Zanetti	Ducati 1098R	20	+42.801	15	2
15	4	(Japan) Hiroshi Aoyama	Honda CBR1000RR	20	+49.144	17	1
16	44	(Spain) David Salom	Kawasaki ZX-10R	20	+50.961	16	
17	59	(Italy) Niccolò Canepa	Ducati 1098R	20	+1:00.863	18	
18	36	(Argentina) Leandro Mercado	Kawasaki ZX-10R	20	+1:14.149	21	
19	64	(Italy) Norino Brignola	BMW S1000RR	20	+1:53.388	22	
20	76	(France) Loris Baz	Kawasaki ZX-10R	19	+1 lap	14	
Ret	2	(United Kingdom) Leon Camier	Suzuki GSX-R1000	17	Retirement	13	
Ret	21	(United States) John Hopkins	Suzuki GSX-R1000	3	Retirement	20	
DNS	96	(Czech Republic) Jakub Smrž	Ducati 1098R		Did not start		
Report:

== Supersport ==
=== Race classification ===
Pos	No.	Rider	Bike	Laps	Time	Grid	Points
1	11	(United Kingdom) Sam Lowes	Honda CBR600RR	18	37:14.284	5	25
2	99	(France) Fabien Foret	Kawasaki ZX-6R	18	+1.446	4	20
3	32	(South Africa) Sheridan Morais	Kawasaki ZX-6R	18	+4.322	2	16
4	23	(Australia) Broc Parkes	Honda CBR600RR	18	+5.924	6	13
5	54	(Turkey) Kenan Sofuoğlu	Kawasaki ZX-6R	18	+6.377	3	11
6	34	(South Africa) Ronan Quarmby	Honda CBR600RR	18	+16.333	11	10
7	31	(Italy) Vittorio Iannuzzo	Triumph Daytona 675	18	+19.948	7	9
8	3	(Australia) Jed Metcher	Yamaha YZF-R6	18	+22.663	8	8
9	14	(Hungary) Gábor Talmácsi	Honda CBR600RR	18	+22.889	16	7
10	64	(United States) Josh Day	Kawasaki ZX-6R	18	+26.923	14	6
11	98	(France) Romain Lanusse	Kawasaki ZX-6R	18	+35.991	9	5
12	87	(Italy) Luca Marconi	Yamaha YZF-R6	18	+42.337	21	4
13	35	(Italy) Raffaele De Rosa	Honda CBR600RR	18	+42.597	19	3
14	61	(Italy) Fabio Menghi	Yamaha YZF-R6	18	+1:10.910	25	2
15	22	(Italy) Roberto Tamburini	Honda CBR600RR	18	+1:16.813	15	1
16	17	(Italy) Roberto Anastasia	Honda CBR600RR	18	+1:53.578	27	
17	13	(Italy) Dino Lombardi	Yamaha YZF-R6	18	+2:27.755	22	
18	73	(Russia) Oleg Pozdneev	Yamaha YZF-R6	17	+1 lap	29	
19	24	(Russia) Eduard Blokhin	Yamaha YZF-R6	17	+1 lap	28	
Ret	25	(Italy) Alex Baldolini	Triumph Daytona 675	10	Retirement	12	
Ret	10	(Hungary) Imre Tóth	Honda CBR600RR	9	Retirement	18	
Ret	8	(Italy) Andrea Antonelli	Yamaha YZF-R6	7	Accident	17	
Ret	65	(Russia) Vladimir Leonov	Yamaha YZF-R6	7	Retirement	20	
Ret	38	(Hungary) Balázs Németh	Honda CBR600RR	6	Accident	23	
Ret	19	(Poland) Paweł Szkopek	Honda CBR600RR	3	Retirement	24	
Ret	16	(France) Jules Cluzel	Honda CBR600RR	2	Accident	1	
Ret	33	(Austria) Yves Polzer	Yamaha YZF-R6	0	Accident	26	
Ret	53	(France) Valentin Debise	Honda CBR600RR	0	Accident	13	
Ret	20	(South Africa) Matthew Scholtz	Honda CBR600RR	0	Accident	10	
DNS	40	(United Kingdom) Martin Jessopp	Honda CBR600RR		Did not start		
Report:

== Superstock ==
=== STK1000 Race classification ===
Pos	No.	Rider	Bike	Laps	Time	Grid	Points
1	67	(Australia) Bryan Staring	Kawasaki ZX-10R	12	24:28.928	5	25
2	11	(France) Jérémy Guarnoni	Kawasaki ZX-10R	12	+8.073	2	20
3	14	(Italy) Lorenzo Baroni	BMW S1000RR	12	+11.320	3	16
4	47	(Italy) Eddi La Marra	Ducati 1199 Panigale	12	+14.630	4	16
5	21	(Germany) Markus Reiterberger	BMW S1000RR	12	+15.911	6	11
6	24	(United Kingdom) Kev Coghlan	Ducati 1199 Panigale	12	+24.471	7	10
7	5	(Italy) Marco Bussolotti	Ducati 1098R	12	+28.367	9	9
8	169	(South Africa) David McFadden	Kawasaki ZX-10R	12	+28.914	11	8
9	71	(Sweden) Christoffer Bergman	Kawasaki ZX-10R	12	+30.095	12	7
10	15	(Italy) Fabio Massei	Honda CBR1000RR	12	+31.619	10	6
11	69	(Czech Republic) Ondřej Ježek	Ducati 1098R	12	+32.444	14	5
12	96	(Spain) Enrique Ferrer	Ducati 1199 Panigale	12	+32.702	13	4
13	32	(Italy) Lorenzo Savadori	Ducati 1199 Panigale	12	+45.294	8	3
14	40	(Hungary) Alen Győrfi	Honda CBR1000RR	12	+50.277	17	2
15	155	(Portugal) Tiago Dias	Kawasaki ZX-10R	12	+50.907	19	1
16	39	(France) Randy Pagaud	Kawasaki ZX-10R	12	+51.007	18	
17	88	(Italy) Massimo Parziani	Aprilia RSV4 APRC	12	+57.789	22	
18	36	(Brazil) Philippe Thiriet	Kawasaki ZX-10R	12	+1:17.018	21	
19	30	(Romania) Bogdan Vrăjitoru	Kawasaki ZX-10R	12	+1:17.982	24	
20	27	(France) Adrien Protat	Kawasaki ZX-10R	12	+1:25.672	23	
21	42	(Brazil) Heber Pedrosa	Kawasaki ZX-10R	12	+1:53.135	25	
Ret	55	(Slovakia) Tomáš Svitok	Ducati 1098R	8	Retirement	15	
Ret	20	(France) Sylvain Barrier	BMW S1000RR	5	Retirement	1	
Ret	37	(Poland) Andrzej Chmielewski	Ducati 1098R	0	Accident	20	
Ret	93	(France) Mathieu Lussiana	Kawasaki ZX-10R	0	Accident	16	
Report:
