= 2012 Silverstone Superbike World Championship round =

(United Kingdom) 2012 Silverstone Superbike World Championship round
Round details
- Round 10 of 14 rounds in the 2012 Superbike World Championship. and Round 9 of 13 rounds in the 2012 Supersport World Championship.
- Date: 5 August, 2012
- Location: Silverstone
- Course: Permanent racing facility 5.900 km (3.666 mi)

Superbike World Championship
Pole position
(Czech Republic) Jakub Smrž
2:20.810
Fastest lap race 1	Fastest lap race 2
(Italy) Ayrton Badovini	(France) Loris Baz
2:06.764	2:24.324

Supersport World Championship
Pole position
(France) Jules Cluzel
2:22.258
Fastest lap
(France) Jules Cluzel
2:09.313

The 2012 Silverstone Superbike World Championship round was the tenth round of the 2012 Superbike World Championship. it took place over the weekend of 3–5 August 2012 at the Silverstone Circuit located in Northamptonshire, England.

== Superbike ==
=== Race 1 classification ===
The race was stopped after an incident involved David Johnson and Norino Brignola. The race was later fully restarted to its original distance.

Pos	No.	Rider	Bike	Laps	Time	Grid	Points
1	76	(France) Loris Baz	Kawasaki ZX-10R	18	40:46.128	9	25
2	84	(Italy) Michel Fabrizio	BMW S1000RR	18	+0.383	15	20
3	86	(Italy) Ayrton Badovini	BMW S1000RR	18	+0.459	18	16
4	65	(United Kingdom) Jonathan Rea	Honda CBR1000RR	18	+0.539	10	13
5	7	(Spain) Carlos Checa	Ducati 1098R	18	+1.012	7	11
6	91	(United Kingdom) Leon Haslam	BMW S1000RR	18	+2.619	4	10
7	33	(Italy) Marco Melandri	BMW S1000RR	18	+6.123	6	9
8	66	(United Kingdom) Tom Sykes	Kawasaki ZX-10R	18	+9.170	8	8
9	34	(Italy) Davide Giugliano	Ducati 1098R	18	+19.022	5	7
10	58	(Republic of Ireland) Eugene Laverty	Aprilia RSV4 Factory	18	+19.087	14	6
11	121	(France) Maxime Berger	Ducati 1098R	18	+29.840	13	5
12	87	(Italy) Lorenzo Zanetti	Ducati 1098R	18	+30.158	19	4
13	4	(Japan) Hiroshi Aoyama	Honda CBR1000RR	18	+44.222	20	3
14	19	(United Kingdom) Chaz Davies	Aprilia RSV4 Factory	18	+1:20.387	16	2
15	44	(Spain) David Salom	Kawasaki ZX-10R	18	+1:42.698	21	1
16	50	(France) Sylvain Guintoli	Ducati 1098R	17	+1 lap	3	
17	96	(Czech Republic) Jakub Smrž	Ducati 1098R	17	+1 lap	1	
Ret	3	(Italy) Max Biaggi	Aprilia RSV4 Factory	17	Accident	11	
Ret	2	(United Kingdom) Leon Camier	Suzuki GSX-R1000	14	Accident	2	
Ret	59	(Italy) Niccolò Canepa	Ducati 1098R	14	Retirement	17	
Ret	21	(United States) John Hopkins	Suzuki GSX-R1000	10	Retirement	12	
DNS	64	(Italy) Norino Brignola	BMW S1000RR	0	Did not start	23	
DNS	20	(Australia) David Johnson	Kawasaki ZX-10R	0	Did not start	22	
DNS	68	(Canada) Brett McCormick	Ducati 1098R		Did not start		
Report:

=== Race 2 classification ===
The race was stopped after 9 laps completed due to weather conditions and riders crashed variously at that laps, as the 2/3 distance wasn't completed, half points were given to the riders and the result were taken from lap 8.

Pos	No.	Rider	Bike	Laps	Time	Grid	Points
1	50	(France) Sylvain Guintoli	Ducati 1098R	8	19:42.051	3	12.5
2	76	(France) Loris Baz	Kawasaki ZX-10R	8	+0.881	9	10
3	96	(Czech Republic) Jakub Smrž	Ducati 1098R	8	+1.671	1	8
4	58	(Republic of Ireland) Eugene Laverty	Aprilia RSV4 Factory	8	+19.045	14	6.5
5	121	(France) Maxime Berger	Ducati 1098R	8	+22.116	13	5.5
6	7	(Spain) Carlos Checa	Ducati 1098R	8	+23.736	7	5
7	19	(United Kingdom) Chaz Davies	Aprilia RSV4 Factory	8	+24.690	16	4.5
8	33	(Italy) Marco Melandri	BMW S1000RR	8	+26.197	6	4
9	65	(United Kingdom) Jonathan Rea	Honda CBR1000RR	8	+26.861	10	3.5
10	21	(United States) John Hopkins	Suzuki GSX-R1000	8	+27.194	12	3
11	3	(Italy) Max Biaggi	Aprilia RSV4 Factory	8	+29.243	11	2.5
12	66	(United Kingdom) Tom Sykes	Kawasaki ZX-10R	8	+30.328	8	2
13	84	(Italy) Michel Fabrizio	BMW S1000RR	8	+32.746	15	1.1
14	4	(Japan) Hiroshi Aoyama	Honda CBR1000RR	8	+34.905	20	1
15	59	(Italy) Niccolò Canepa	Ducati 1098R	8	+35.849	17	0.5
16	57	(Italy) Lorenzo Zanetii	Ducati 1098R	8	+40.091	19	
17	91	(United Kingdom) Leon Haslam	BMW S1000RR	8	+58.530	4	
Ret	86	(Italy) Ayrton Badovini	BMW S1000RR	7	Accident	18	
Ret	34	(Italy) Davide Giugliano	Ducati 1098R	6	Accident	5	
Ret	2	(United Kingdom) Leon Camier	Suzuki GSX-R1000	4	Retirement	2	
Ret	44	(Spain) David Salom	Kawasaki ZX-10R	1	Retirement	21	
DNS	20	(Australia) David Johnson	Kawasaki ZX-10R		Did not start		
DNS	64	(Italy) Norino Brignola	BMW S1000RR		Did not start		
DNS	68	(Canada) Brett McCormick	Ducati 1098R		Did not start		
Report:

== Supersport ==
=== Race classification ===
Pos	No.	Rider	Bike	Laps	Time	Grid	Points
1	16	(France) Jules Cluzel	Honda CBR600RR	16	34:48.860	1	25
2	11	(United Kingdom) Sam Lowes	Honda CBR600RR	16	+0.157	2	20
3	23	(Australia) Broc Parkes	Honda CBR600RR	16	+0.591	18	16
4	34	(South Africa) Ronan Quarmby	Honda CBR600RR	16	+2.068	7	13
5	54	(Turkey) Kenan Sofuoğlu	Kawasaki ZX-6R	16	+5.067	10	11
6	99	(France) Fabien Foret	Kawasaki ZX-6R	16	+19.484	17	10
7	32	(South Africa) Sheridan Morais	Kawasaki ZX-6R	16	+20.038	15	9
8	25	(Italy) Alex Baldolini	Triumph Daytona 675	16	+23.169	9	8
9	8	(Italy) Andrea Antonelli	Yamaha YZF-R6	16	+23.964	8	7
10	14	(Hungary) Gábor Talmácsi	Honda CBR600RR	16	+27.061	14	6
11	20	(South Africa) Matthew Scholtz	Honda CBR600RR	16	+28.992	4	5
12	22	(Italy) Roberto Tamburini	Honda CBR600RR	16	+29.652	26	4
13	31	(Italy) Vittorio Iannuzzo	Triumph Daytona 675	16	+30.077	24	3
14	98	(France) Romain Lanusse	Kawasaki ZX-6R	16	+30.311	13	2
15	35	(Italy) Raffaele De Rosa	Honda CBR600RR	16	+31.328	11	1
16	5	(Sweden) Alexander Lundh	Honda CBR600RR	16	+31.442	3	
17	10	(Hungary) Imre Tóth	Honda CBR600RR	16	+37.636	5	
18	65	(Russia) Vladimir Leonov	Yamaha YZF-R6	16	+38.733	6	
19	93	(France) Florian Marino	Kawasaki ZX-6R	16	+41.414	25	
20	13	(Italy) Dino Lombardi	Yamaha YZF-R6	16	+46.105	30	
21	40	(United Kingdom) Martin Jessopp	Honda CBR600RR	16	+48.442	16	
22	61	(Italy) Fabio Menghi	Yamaha YZF-R6	16	+1:03.403	28	
23	24	(Russia) Eduard Blokhin	Yamaha YZF-R6	16	+2:04.976	31	
Ret	64	(United States) Josh Day	Kawasaki ZX-6R	14	Retirement	20	
Ret	87	(Italy) Luca Marconi	Yamaha YZF-R6	13	Retirement	22	
Ret	3	(Australia) Jed Metcher	Yamaha YZF-R6	6	Retirement	23	
Ret	4	(United Kingdom) Dan Linfoot	Kawasaki ZX-6R	4	Retirement	19	
Ret	125	(Italy) Danilo Marrancone	Honda CBR600RR	4	Retirement	29	
Ret	49	(United States) Kenny Noyes	Suzuki GSX-R600	0	Accident	21	
Ret	38	(Hungary) Balázs Németh	Honda CBR600RR	0	Retirement	12	
DNS	53	(France) Valentin Debise	Honda CBR600RR	0	Did not start	27	
DNQ	73	(Russia) Oleg Pozdneev	Yamaha YZF-R6		Did not qualify		
Report:

== Superstock ==
=== STK1000 race classification ===
Pos	No.	Rider	Bike	Laps	Time	Grid	Points
1	47	(Italy) Eddi La Marra	Ducati 1199 Panigale	10	21:42.623	3	25
2	11	(France) Jérémy Guarnoni	Kawasaki ZX-10R	10	+0.241	2	20
3	67	(Australia) Bryan Staring	Kawasaki ZX-10R	10	+3.054	14	16
4	20	(France) Sylvain Barrier	BMW S1000RR	10	+3.198	1	13
5	24	(United Kingdom) Kev Coghlan	Ducati 1199 Panigale	10	+7.920	5	11
6	71	(Sweden) Christoffer Bergman	Kawasaki ZX-10R	10	+12.551	10	10
7	69	(Czech Republic) Ondřej Ježek	Ducati 1098R	10	+15.888	6	9
8	92	(Argentina) Leandro Mercado	Kawasaki ZX-10R	10	+19.155	11	8
9	21	(Germany) Markus Reiterberger	BMW S1000RR	10	+27.657	12	7
10	15	(Italy) Fabio Massei	Honda CBR1000RR	10	+28.067	15	6
11	34	(United Kingdom) Robbie Brown	Ducati 1199 Panigale	10	+32.641	7	5
12	40	(Hungary) Alen Győrfi	Honda CBR1000RR	10	+32.674	9	4
13	39	(France) Randy Pagaud	Kawasaki ZX-10R	10	+54.660	18	3
14	37	(Poland) Andrzej Chmielewski	Ducati 1098R	10	+58.245	19	2
15	88	(Italy) Massimo Parziani	Aprilia RSV4 APRC	10	+58.720	17	1
16	36	(Brazil) Philippe Thiriet	Kawasaki ZX-10R	10	+1:00.305	20	
17	42	(Brazil) Heber Pedrosa	Kawasaki ZX-10R	10	+1:00.498	21	
Ret	55	(Slovakia) Tomáš Svitok	Ducati 1098R	7	Accident	16	
Ret	93	(France) Mathieu Lussiana	Kawasaki ZX-10R	6	Accident	4	
Ret	5	(Italy) Marco Bussolotti	Ducati 1098R	2	Retirement	13	
Ret	32	(Italy) Lorenzo Savadori	Ducati 1199 Panigale	0	Retirement	8	
DNS	14	(Italy) Lorenzo Baroni	BMW S1000RR		Did not start		
DNQ	30	(Romania) Bogdan Vrăjitoru	Kawasaki ZX-10R		Did not qualify		
Report:
