= 2012 Superbike World Championship =

2012 Superbike World Championship
Previous:	2011	Next:	2013
Support series: Supersport World Championship; FIM Superstock 1000 Cup; European Superstock 600 Championship; European Junior Cup

The 2012 Superbike World Championship was the twenty-fifth season of the Superbike World Championship. It began on 26 February at Phillip Island and ended on 7 October in Magny-Cours after 14 rounds.

The season saw the number of complete motorcycles in use limited to one per rider; this meant that the rules allowing bike changes during a race (flag-to-flag) were cancelled.

Aprilia rider Max Biaggi clinched his second SBK championship, pipping Kawasaki rider Tom Sykes by just half a point. Marco Melandri won more races than both Biaggi and Sykes this season but failing to score points in 5 of the last 6 races cost him the title.

== Race calendar and results ==
The provisional race schedule was publicly announced by the FIM on 24 September 2011 with thirteen confirmed rounds and two other rounds pending confirmation. Russia appeared for the first time in the calendar with a round at the brand-new Moscow Raceway. The calendar was updated in October 2011 with the confirmation of the Imola round, for a total fourteen rounds. All races with the exception of Miller Motorsports Park – races held on Memorial Day Monday – were held on Sundays.

2012 Superbike World Championship Calendar
Round		Country	Circuit	Date	Superpole	Fastest lap	Winning rider	Winning team	Report
1	R1	Australia	Phillip Island Grand Prix Circuit	26 February	(United Kingdom) Tom Sykes (Note: Superpole cancelled; grid for both races established from the two qualifying sessions.)	(Italy) Max Biaggi	(Italy) Max Biaggi	Aprilia Racing Team	Report
1	R2	Australia	Phillip Island Grand Prix Circuit	26 February	(United Kingdom) Tom Sykes	(Spain) Carlos Checa	(Spain) Carlos Checa	Althea Racing	Report
2	R1	Italy	Autodromo Enzo e Dino Ferrari	1 April	(United Kingdom) Tom Sykes	(Spain) Carlos Checa	(Spain) Carlos Checa	Althea Racing	Report
2	R2	Italy	Autodromo Enzo e Dino Ferrari	1 April	(United Kingdom) Tom Sykes	(United Kingdom) Tom Sykes	(Spain) Carlos Checa	Althea Racing	Report
3	R1	Netherlands	TT Circuit Assen	22 April	(United Kingdom) Tom Sykes	(France) Sylvain Guintoli	(France) Sylvain Guintoli	Team Effenbert Liberty Racing	Report
3	R2	Netherlands	TT Circuit Assen	22 April	(United Kingdom) Tom Sykes	(Spain) Carlos Checa	(United Kingdom) Jonathan Rea	Honda World Superbike Team	Report
4	R1	Italy	Autodromo Nazionale di Monza	6 May	(France) Sylvain Guintoli	Race cancelled (Note: After the first attempt to run the race was stopped as riders were completing the third lap, the race was abandoned after it was deemed unsafe for a restart.)			Report
4	R2	Italy	Autodromo Nazionale di Monza	6 May	(France) Sylvain Guintoli	(United Kingdom) Tom Sykes	(United Kingdom) Tom Sykes	Kawasaki Racing Team	Report
5	R1	United Kingdom	Donington Park	13 May	(United Kingdom) Tom Sykes	(Italy) Max Biaggi	(Italy) Marco Melandri	BMW Motorrad Motorsport	Report
5	R2	United Kingdom	Donington Park	13 May	(United Kingdom) Tom Sykes	(Italy) Max Biaggi	(United Kingdom) Jonathan Rea	Honda World Superbike Team	Report
6	R1	United States	Miller Motorsports Park	28 May	(Czech Republic) Jakub Smrž	(Italy) Marco Melandri	(Spain) Carlos Checa	Althea Racing	Report
6	R2	United States	Miller Motorsports Park	28 May	(Czech Republic) Jakub Smrž	(Spain) Carlos Checa	(Italy) Marco Melandri	BMW Motorrad Motorsport	Report
7	R1	San Marino	Misano World Circuit Marco Simoncelli	10 June	(United Kingdom) Tom Sykes	(Spain) Carlos Checa	(Italy) Max Biaggi	Aprilia Racing Team	Report
7	R2	San Marino	Misano World Circuit Marco Simoncelli	10 June	(United Kingdom) Tom Sykes	(Italy) Max Biaggi	(Italy) Max Biaggi	Aprilia Racing Team	Report
8	R1	Spain	Motorland Aragón	1 July	(United Kingdom) Tom Sykes	(Italy) Marco Melandri	(Italy) Max Biaggi	Aprilia Racing Team	Report
8	R2	Spain	Motorland Aragón	1 July	(United Kingdom) Tom Sykes	(Italy) Marco Melandri	(Italy) Marco Melandri	BMW Motorrad Motorsport	Report
9	R1	Czech Republic	Masaryk Circuit	22 July	(United Kingdom) Tom Sykes	(Spain) Carlos Checa	(Italy) Marco Melandri	BMW Motorrad Motorsport	Report
9	R2	Czech Republic	Masaryk Circuit	22 July	(United Kingdom) Tom Sykes	(United Kingdom) Tom Sykes	(Italy) Marco Melandri	BMW Motorrad Motorsport	Report
10	R1	United Kingdom	Silverstone Circuit	5 August	(Czech Republic) Jakub Smrž	(Italy) Ayrton Badovini	(France) Loris Baz	Kawasaki Racing Team	Report
10	R2	United Kingdom	Silverstone Circuit	5 August	(Czech Republic) Jakub Smrž	(France) Loris Baz	(France) Sylvain Guintoli	PATA Racing Team	Report
11	R1	Russia	Moscow Raceway	26 August	(Spain) Carlos Checa	(United Kingdom) Leon Haslam	(United Kingdom) Tom Sykes	Kawasaki Racing Team	Report
11	R2	Russia	Moscow Raceway	26 August	(Spain) Carlos Checa	(Italy) Marco Melandri	(Italy) Marco Melandri	BMW Motorrad Motorsport	Report
12	R1	Germany	Nürburgring	9 September	(Italy) Max Biaggi	(Italy) Max Biaggi	(Italy) Max Biaggi	Aprilia Racing Team	Report
12	R2	Germany	Nürburgring	9 September	(Italy) Max Biaggi	(Spain) Carlos Checa	(United Kingdom) Chaz Davies	ParkinGO MTC Racing	Report
13	R1	Portugal	Autódromo Internacional do Algarve	23 September	(United Kingdom) Tom Sykes	(Spain) Carlos Checa	(United Kingdom) Tom Sykes	Kawasaki Racing Team	Report
13	R2	Portugal	Autódromo Internacional do Algarve	23 September	(United Kingdom) Tom Sykes	(Republic of Ireland) Eugene Laverty	(Republic of Ireland) Eugene Laverty	Aprilia Racing Team	Report
14	R1	France	Circuit de Nevers Magny-Cours	7 October	(United Kingdom) Tom Sykes	(France) Sylvain Guintoli	(France) Sylvain Guintoli	PATA Racing Team	Report
14	R2	France	Circuit de Nevers Magny-Cours	7 October	(United Kingdom) Tom Sykes	(Italy) Davide Giugliano	(United Kingdom) Tom Sykes	Kawasaki Racing Team	Report

Footnotes

== Entry list ==
- A provisional entry list was released by the Fédération Internationale de Motocyclisme on 18 January 2012.

2012 entry list
Team	Constructor	Motorcycle	No.	Rider	Rounds
(Italy) Aprilia Racing Team	Aprilia	Aprilia RSV4 Factory	3	(Italy) Max Biaggi	All
(Italy) Aprilia Racing Team	Aprilia	Aprilia RSV4 Factory	58	(Republic of Ireland) Eugene Laverty	All
(Netherlands) ParkinGO MTC Racing	Aprilia	Aprilia RSV4 Factory	19	(United Kingdom) Chaz Davies	All
(Italy) BMW Motorrad Italia GoldBet	BMW	BMW S1000RR	84	(Italy) Michel Fabrizio	All
(Italy) BMW Motorrad Italia GoldBet	BMW	BMW S1000RR	86	(Italy) Ayrton Badovini	All
(Germany) BMW Motorrad Motorsport	BMW	BMW S1000RR	33	(Italy) Marco Melandri	All
(Germany) BMW Motorrad Motorsport	BMW	BMW S1000RR	91	(United Kingdom) Leon Haslam	All
(Italy) Grillini Progea Superbike Team	BMW	BMW S1000RR	16	(United States) Jake Holden	6
(Italy) Grillini Progea Superbike Team	BMW	BMW S1000RR	18	(Australia) Mark Aitchison	1–5
(Italy) Grillini Progea Superbike Team	BMW	BMW S1000RR	23	(Italy) Federico Sandi	7
(Italy) Grillini Progea Superbike Team	BMW	BMW S1000RR	64	(Italy) Norino Brignola	8–10, 12–14
(Australia) Rossair AEP Racing	BMW	BMW S1000RR	20	(Australia) David Johnson	1
(Italy) Althea Racing	Ducati	Ducati 1098R	7	(Spain) Carlos Checa	All
(Italy) Althea Racing	Ducati	Ducati 1098R	34	(Italy) Davide Giugliano	All
(Italy) Barni Racing Team Italia	Ducati	Ducati 1098R	151	(Italy) Matteo Baiocco	7
(United States) Boulder Motor Sports	Ducati	Ducati 1098R	14	(United States) Shane Turpin	6
(Italy) PATA Racing Team	Ducati	Ducati 1098R	50	(France) Sylvain Guintoli	10–14
(Italy) PATA Racing Team	Ducati	Ducati 1098R	87	(Italy) Lorenzo Zanetti	All
(Italy) Red Devils Roma	Ducati	Ducati 1098R	53	(Italy) Alex Polita	9
(Italy) Red Devils Roma	Ducati	Ducati 1098R	59	(Italy) Niccolò Canepa	1–8, 10–12
(Italy) Red Devils Roma	Ducati	Ducati 1098R	121	(France) Maxime Berger	14
(Italy) Red Devils Roma	Ducati	Ducati 1098R	151	(Italy) Matteo Baiocco	13
(Czech Republic) Team Effenbert Liberty Racing	Ducati	Ducati 1098R	50	(France) Sylvain Guintoli	1–8
(Czech Republic) Team Effenbert Liberty Racing	Ducati	Ducati 1098R	57	(Italy) Lorenzo Lanzi	12–13
(Czech Republic) Team Effenbert Liberty Racing	Ducati	Ducati 1098R	68	(Canada) Brett McCormick	2–3, 10, 12–13
(Czech Republic) Team Effenbert Liberty Racing	Ducati	Ducati 1098R	96	(Czech Republic) Jakub Smrž	1–10
(Czech Republic) Team Effenbert Liberty Racing	Ducati	Ducati 1098R	121	(France) Maxime Berger	1–10, 12
(Netherlands) Honda World Superbike Team	Honda	Honda CBR1000RR	4	(Japan) Hiroshi Aoyama	All
(Netherlands) Honda World Superbike Team	Honda	Honda CBR1000RR	65	(United Kingdom) Jonathan Rea	All
(Hungary) Prop-tech ltd	Honda	Honda CBR1000RR	13	(Hungary) Viktor Kispataki	9
(Italy) Team Pro Ride Real Game Honda	Honda	Honda CBR1000RR	15	(Italy) Lorenzo Alfonsi	2
(Italy) Team Pro Ride Real Game Honda	Honda	Honda CBR1000RR	35	(Italy) Raffaele De Rosa	1
(Japan) Kawasaki Racing Team	Kawasaki	Kawasaki ZX-10R	17	(Spain) Joan Lascorz	1–2
(Japan) Kawasaki Racing Team	Kawasaki	Kawasaki ZX-10R	66	(United Kingdom) Tom Sykes	All
(Japan) Kawasaki Racing Team	Kawasaki	Kawasaki ZX-10R	76	(France) Loris Baz	5–14
(Japan) Kawasaki Racing Team	Kawasaki	Kawasaki ZX-10R	199	(Spain) Sergio Gadea	4
(Italy) Team Pedercini	Kawasaki	Kawasaki ZX-10R	5	(Sweden) Alexander Lundh	11–14
(Italy) Team Pedercini	Kawasaki	Kawasaki ZX-10R	20	(Australia) David Johnson	10
(Italy) Team Pedercini	Kawasaki	Kawasaki ZX-10R	36	(Argentina) Leandro Mercado	2–9
(Italy) Team Pedercini	Kawasaki	Kawasaki ZX-10R	44	(Spain) David Salom	1–4, 6–13
(Italy) Team Pedercini	Kawasaki	Kawasaki ZX-10R	67	(Australia) Bryan Staring	1
(Italy) Team Pedercini	Kawasaki	Kawasaki ZX-10R	69	(South Africa) David McFadden	11
(Italy) Team Pedercini	Kawasaki	Kawasaki ZX-10R	71	(Italy) Claudio Corti	14
(Italy) Team Pedercini	Kawasaki	Kawasaki ZX-10R	101	(United Kingdom) Gary Mason	5
(United Kingdom) Crescent Fixi Suzuki	Suzuki	Suzuki GSX-R1000	2	(United Kingdom) Leon Camier	All
(United Kingdom) Crescent Fixi Suzuki	Suzuki	Suzuki GSX-R1000	21	(United States) John Hopkins	2–4, 6–14
(United Kingdom) Crescent Fixi Suzuki	Suzuki	Suzuki GSX-R1000	25	(Australia) Josh Brookes	1
(United Kingdom) Crescent Fixi Suzuki	Suzuki	Suzuki GSX-R1000	60	(United Kingdom) Peter Hickman	5

Key
Regular rider
Wildcard rider
Replacement rider

- All entries used Pirelli tyres.

== Championship standings ==
=== Riders' standings ===
Pos.	Rider	Bike	AUS (Australia)		ITA (Italy)		NED (Netherlands)		ITA (Italy)		EUR (United Kingdom)		USA (United States)		SMR (San Marino)		SPA (Spain)		CZE (Czech Republic)		GBR (United Kingdom)		RUS (Russia)		GER (Germany)		POR (Portugal)		FRA (France)		Pts
Pos.	Rider	Bike	R1	R2	R1	R2	R1	R2	R1	R2	R1	R2	R1	R2	R1	R2	R1	R2	R1	R2	R1	R2	R1	R2	R1	R2	R1	R2	R1	R2	Pts
1	(Italy) Max Biaggi	Aprilia	1	2	4	4	4	8	C	5	5	2	3	3	1	1	1	4	6	4	Ret	11	3	Ret	**1**	**13**	4	3	Ret	5	358
2	(United Kingdom) Tom Sykes	Kawasaki	**4**	**3**	**2**	**2**	**Ret**	**6**	C	1	**3**	**3**	8	5	**4**	**7**	**Ret**	**8**	**2**	**2**	8	12	1	2	4	5	**1**	**Ret**	**3**	**1**	357.5
3	(Italy) Marco Melandri	BMW	2	6	6	10	9	4	C	4	1	Ret	2	1	Ret	4	2	1	1	1	7	8	2	1	Ret	Ret	Ret	DNS	2	Ret	328.5
4	(Spain) Carlos Checa	Ducati	Ret	1	1	1	3	17	C	7	6	Ret	1	Ret	2	Ret	3	7	4	3	5	6	**Ret**	**4**	12	6	2	5	Ret	7	287.5
5	(United Kingdom) Jonathan Rea	Honda	7	4	9	5	Ret	1	C	6	4	1	4	2	5	2	16	5	Ret	12	4	9	Ret	7	Ret	4	6	2	13	2	278.5
6	(Republic of Ireland) Eugene Laverty	Aprilia	Ret	8	5	6	5	3	C	3	15	Ret	5	6	7	Ret	5	2	5	5	10	4	4	Ret	2	2	13	1	7	4	263.5
7	(France) Sylvain Guintoli	Ducati	3	Ret	Ret	11	1	2	**C**	**DNS**	8	5	12	10	8	Ret	12	13			16	1	Ret	11	6	10	3	4	1	3	213.5
8	(United Kingdom) Leon Haslam	BMW	12	5	3	3	Ret	5	C	2	2	15	10	8	12	3	7	6	7	7	6	17	6	Ret	7	Ret	19	Ret	5	Ret	200
9	(United Kingdom) Chaz Davies	Aprilia	DNS	DNS	Ret	14	Ret	Ret	C	12	12	7	7	4	6	Ret	4	3	11	6	14	7	Ret	3	3	1	Ret	Ret	Ret	8	164.5
10	(Italy) Davide Giugliano	Ducati	9	13	Ret	Ret	2	9	C	8	7	Ret	11	7	3	Ret	8	10	Ret	11	9	Ret	Ret	6	Ret	7	Ret	NC	8	6	143
11	(Italy) Michel Fabrizio	BMW	6	Ret	Ret	Ret	6	10	C	DNS	10	13	9	12	14	6	6	11	8	10	2	13	5	Ret	Ret	Ret	10	8	12	Ret	137.5
12	(Italy) Ayrton Badovini	BMW	Ret	Ret	15	15	Ret	7	C	10	11	6	14	13	11	5	Ret	9	Ret	Ret	3	Ret	12	8	9	9	9	6	6	9	133
13	(France) Loris Baz	Kawasaki									16	8	15	14	Ret	8	Ret	20	3	8	1	2	11	9	Ret	8	7	7	10	Ret	122
14	(United Kingdom) Leon Camier	Suzuki	17	12	Ret	8	Ret	14	C	15	9	4	13	11	10	15	9	Ret	14	9	Ret	Ret	15	5	5	3	11	Ret	Ret	10	115.5
15	(Czech Republic) Jakub Smrž	Ducati	5	11	11	7	7	Ret	C	9	14	Ret	**6**	**9**	9	9	Ret	DNS	10	13	**17**	**3**									92.5
16	(France) Maxime Berger	Ducati	13	7	12	12	11	Ret	C	13	13	Ret	16	15	13	11	10	12	9	15	11	5			11	14			4	11	92
17	(Italy) Lorenzo Zanetti	Ducati	11	14	8	13	14	Ret	C	14	18	12	Ret	Ret	Ret	Ret	13	14	16	16	12	16	8	10	8	11	16	12	Ret	13	68
18	(Japan) Hiroshi Aoyama	Honda	8	9	18	Ret	12	13	C	11	17	10	17	DNS	16	12	14	15	Ret	Ret	13	14	13	Ret	10	15	8	Ret	Ret	14	61.5
19	(United States) John Hopkins	Suzuki			13	Ret	Ret	11	C	DNS			Ret	16	17	14	15	Ret	15	14	Ret	10	9	12	13	12	12	11	DNS	DNS	44
20	(Italy) Niccolò Canepa	Ducati	20	10	10	Ret	8	Ret	C	17	19	11	Ret	Ret	18	13	11	17			Ret	15	7	Ret	DNS	DNS					42.5
21	(Spain) David Salom	Kawasaki	14	Ret	19	17	13	12	C	DNS			Ret	Ret	Ret	Ret	Ret	16	18	Ret	15	Ret	10	13	DNS	DNS	Ret	13			22
22	(Canada) Brett McCormick	Ducati			16	16	Ret	Ret													DNS	DNS			15	Ret	5	9			19
23	(Spain) Joan Lascorz	Kawasaki	15	Ret	7	9																									17
24	(Italy) Claudio Corti	Kawasaki																											9	12	11
25	(Italy) Norino Brignola	BMW															17	19	13	17	DNS	DNS			17	17	17	15	11	15	10
26	(Argentina) Leandro Mercado	Kawasaki			14	Ret	10	15	C	16	Ret	Ret	Ret	17	19	16	Ret	18	Ret	DNS											9
27	(Italy) Lorenzo Lanzi	Ducati																							14	16	18	10			8
28	(Italy) Matteo Baiocco	Ducati													15	10											15	Ret			8
29	(Sweden) Alexander Lundh	Kawasaki																					14	14	16	Ret	14	14	DNS	DNS	8
30	(United Kingdom) Peter Hickman	Suzuki									NC	9																			7
31	(Australia) Bryan Staring	Kawasaki	10	16																											6
32	(Italy) Alessandro Polita	Ducati																	12	Ret											4
33	(Australia) Mark Aitchison	BMW	18	Ret	17	18	15	16	C	DNS	NC	14																			3
34	(Australia) Josh Brookes	Suzuki	16	15																											1
	(South Africa) David McFadden	Kawasaki																					16	Ret							0
	(Hungary) Viktor Kispataki	Honda																	17	18											0
	(Italy) Federico Sandi	BMW													20	17															0
	(Italy) Raffaele De Rosa	Honda	Ret	17																											0
	(United States) Shane Turpin	Ducati											18	19																	0
	(United States) Jake Holden	BMW											19	18																	0
	(Australia) David Johnson	BMW	19	Ret																											0
	(Australia) David Johnson	Kawasaki																			DNS	DNS									0
	(Italy) Lorenzo Alfonsi	Honda			Ret	Ret																									0
	(United Kingdom) Gary Mason	Kawasaki									Ret	Ret																			0
	(Spain) Sergio Gadea	Kawasaki							C	DNS																					0
Pos.	Rider	Bike	AUS (Australia)		ITA (Italy)		NED (Netherlands)		ITA (Italy)		EUR (United Kingdom)		USA (United States)		SMR (San Marino)		SPA (Spain)		CZE (Czech Republic)		GBR (United Kingdom)		RUS (Russia)		GER (Germany)		POR (Portugal)		FRA (France)		Pts

Colour	Result
Gold	Winner
Silver	Second place
Bronze	Third place
Green	Points classification
Blue	Non-points classification
Blue	Non-classified finish (NC)
Purple	Retired, not classified (Ret)
Red	Did not qualify (DNQ)
Red	Did not pre-qualify (DNPQ)
Black	Disqualified (DSQ)
White	Did not start (DNS)
White	Withdrew (WD)
White	Race cancelled (C)
Blank	Did not practice (DNP)
Blank	Did not arrive (DNA)
Blank	Excluded (EX)

**Bold** – Pole position
Italics – Fastest lap

=== Teams' championship ===
Pos.	Team	Bike No.	AUS (Australia)		ITA (Italy)		NED (Netherlands)		ITA (Italy)		EUR (United Kingdom)		USA (United States)		SMR (San Marino)		SPA (Spain)		CZE (Czech Republic)		GBR (United Kingdom)		RUS (Russia)		GER (Germany)		POR (Portugal)		FRA (France)		Pts.
Pos.	Team	Bike No.	R1	R2	R1	R2	R1	R2	R1	R2	R1	R2	R1	R2	R1	R2	R1	R2	R1	R2	R1	R2	R1	R2	R1	R2	R1	R2	R1	R2	Pts.
1	(Italy) Aprilia Racing Team	3	1	2	4	4	4	8	C	5	5	2	3	3	1	1	1	4	6	4	Ret	11	3	Ret	**1**	**13**	4	3	Ret	5	621.5
1	(Italy) Aprilia Racing Team	58	Ret	8	5	6	5	3	C	3	15	Ret	5	6	7	Ret	5	2	5	5	10	4	4	Ret	2	2	13	1	7	4	621.5
2	(Germany) BMW Motorrad Motorsport	33	2	6	6	10	9	4	C	4	1	Ret	2	1	Ret	4	2	1	1	1	7	8	2	1	Ret	Ret	Ret	DNS	2	Ret	528.5
2	(Germany) BMW Motorrad Motorsport	91	12	5	3	3	Ret	5	C	2	2	15	10	8	12	3	7	6	7	7	6	17	6	Ret	7	Ret	19	Ret	5	Ret	528.5
3	(Japan) Kawasaki Racing Team	66	**4**	**3**	**2**	**2**	**Ret**	**6**	C	1	**3**	**3**	8	5	**4**	**7**	**Ret**	**8**	**2**	**2**	8	12	1	2	4	5	**1**	**Ret**	**3**	**1**	496.5
3	(Japan) Kawasaki Racing Team	76									16	8	15	14	Ret	8	Ret	20	3	8	1	2	11	9	Ret	8	7	7	10	Ret	496.5
3	(Japan) Kawasaki Racing Team	17	15	Ret	7	9																									496.5
3	(Japan) Kawasaki Racing Team	199							C	DNS																					496.5
4	(Italy) Althea Racing	7	Ret	1	1	1	3	17	C	7	6	Ret	1	Ret	2	Ret	3	7	4	3	5	6	**Ret**	**4**	12	6	2	5	Ret	7	430.5
4	(Italy) Althea Racing	34	9	13	Ret	Ret	2	9	C	8	7	Ret	11	7	3	Ret	8	10	Ret	11	9	Ret	Ret	6	Ret	7	Ret	NC	8	6	430.5
5	(Netherlands) Honda World Superbike Team	65	7	4	9	5	Ret	1	C	6	4	1	4	2	5	2	16	5	Ret	12	4	9	Ret	7	Ret	4	6	2	13	2	340
5	(Netherlands) Honda World Superbike Team	4	8	9	18	Ret	12	13	C	11	17	10	17	DNS	16	12	14	15	Ret	Ret	13	14	13	Ret	10	15	8	Ret	Ret	14	340
6	(Czech Republic) Team Effenbert Liberty Racing	50	3	Ret	Ret	11	1	2	**C**	**DNS**	8	5	12	10	8	Ret	12	13													284.5
6	(Czech Republic) Team Effenbert Liberty Racing	96	5	11	11	7	7	Ret	C	9	14	Ret	**6**	**9**	9	9	Ret	DNS	10	13	**17**	**3**									284.5
6	(Czech Republic) Team Effenbert Liberty Racing	121	13	7	12	12	11	Ret	C	13	13	Ret	16	15	13	11	10	12	9	15	11	5			11	14					284.5
6	(Czech Republic) Team Effenbert Liberty Racing	68			16	16	Ret	Ret													DNS	DNS			15	Ret	5	9			284.5
6	(Czech Republic) Team Effenbert Liberty Racing	57																							14	16	18	10			284.5
7	(Italy) BMW Motorrad Italia GoldBet	84	6	Ret	Ret	Ret	6	10	C	DNS	10	13	9	12	14	6	6	11	8	10	2	13	5	Ret	Ret	Ret	10	8	12	Ret	270.5
7	(Italy) BMW Motorrad Italia GoldBet	86	Ret	Ret	15	15	Ret	7	C	10	11	6	14	13	11	5	Ret	9	Ret	Ret	3	Ret	12	8	9	9	9	6	6	9	270.5
8	(Italy) PATA Racing Team	50																			16	1	Ret	11	6	10	3	4	1	3	171.5
8	(Italy) PATA Racing Team	87	11	14	8	13	14	Ret	C	14	18	12	Ret	Ret	Ret	Ret	13	14	16	16	12	16	8	10	8	11	16	12	Ret	13	171.5
9	(United Kingdom) Crescent Fixi Suzuki	2	17	12	Ret	8	Ret	14	C	15	9	4	13	11	10	15	9	Ret	14	9	Ret	Ret	15	5	5	3	11	Ret	Ret	10	167.5
9	(United Kingdom) Crescent Fixi Suzuki	21			13	Ret	Ret	11	C	DNS			Ret	16	17	14	15	Ret	15	14	Ret	10	9	12	13	12	12	11	DNS	DNS	167.5
9	(United Kingdom) Crescent Fixi Suzuki	60									NC	9																			167.5
9	(United Kingdom) Crescent Fixi Suzuki	25	16	15																											167.5
10	(United Kingdom) ParkinGO MTC Racing	19	DNS	DNS	Ret	14	Ret	Ret	C	12	12	7	7	4	6	Ret	4	3	11	6	14	7	Ret	3	3	1	Ret	Ret	Ret	8	164.5
11	(Italy) Red Devils Roma	59	20	10	10	Ret	8	Ret	C	17	19	11	Ret	Ret	18	13	11	17			Ret	15	7	Ret	DNS	DNS					65.5
11	(Italy) Red Devils Roma	121																											4	11	65.5
11	(Italy) Red Devils Roma	53																	12	Ret											65.5
11	(Italy) Red Devils Roma	151																									15	Ret			65.5
12	(Italy) Team Pedercini	44	14	Ret	19	17	13	12	C	DNS			Ret	Ret	Ret	Ret	Ret	16	18	Ret	15	Ret	10	13	DNS	DNS	Ret	13			56
12	(Italy) Team Pedercini	71																											9	12	56
12	(Italy) Team Pedercini	36			14	Ret	10	15	C	16	Ret	Ret	Ret	17	19	16	Ret	18	Ret	DNS											56
12	(Italy) Team Pedercini	5																					14	14	16	Ret	14	14	DNS	DNS	56
12	(Italy) Team Pedercini	67	10	16																											56
12	(Italy) Team Pedercini	101									Ret	Ret																			56
12	(Italy) Team Pedercini	20																			DNS	DNS									56
13	(Italy) Grillini Progea Superbike Team	64															17	19	13	17	DNS	DNS			17	17	17	15	11	15	13
13	(Italy) Grillini Progea Superbike Team	18	18	Ret	17	18	15	16	C	DNS	NC	14																			13
13	(Italy) Grillini Progea Superbike Team	23													20	17															13
13	(Italy) Grillini Progea Superbike Team	16											19	18																	13
	(Italy) Team Pro Ride Real Game Honda	35	Ret	17																											0
	(Italy) Team Pro Ride Real Game Honda	15			Ret	Ret																									0
Pos.	Team	Bike No.	AUS (Australia)		ITA (Italy)		NED (Netherlands)		ITA (Italy)		EUR (United Kingdom)		USA (United States)		SMR (San Marino)		SPA (Spain)		CZE (Czech Republic)		GBR (United Kingdom)		RUS (Russia)		GER (Germany)		POR (Portugal)		FRA (France)		Pts.

=== Manufacturers' standings ===
Pos.	Manufacturer	AUS (Australia)		ITA (Italy)		NED (Netherlands)		ITA (Italy)		EUR (United Kingdom)		USA (United States)		SMR (San Marino)		SPA (Spain)		CZE (Czech Republic)		GBR (United Kingdom)		RUS (Russia)		GER (Germany)		POR (Portugal)		FRA (France)		Pts
Pos.	Manufacturer	R1	R2	R1	R2	R1	R2	R1	R2	R1	R2	R1	R2	R1	R2	R1	R2	R1	R2	R1	R2	R1	R2	R1	R2	R1	R2	R1	R2	Pts
1	(Italy) Aprilia	1	2	4	4	4	3	C	3	5	2	3	3	1	1	1	2	5	4	10	4	3	3	1	1	4	1	7	4	444.5
2	(Germany) BMW	2	5	3	3	6	4	C	2	1	6	2	1	11	3	2	1	1	1	2	8	2	1	7	9	9	6	2	9	421
3	(Italy) Ducati	3	1	1	1	1	2	C	7	6	5	1	7	2	9	3	7	4	3	5	1	7	4	6	6	2	4	1	3	416
4	(Japan) Kawasaki	4	3	2	2	10	6	C	1	3	3	8	5	4	7	Ret	8	2	2	1	2	1	2	4	5	1	7	3	1	397.5
5	(Japan) Honda	7	4	9	5	12	1	C	6	4	1	4	2	5	2	14	5	17	12	4	9	13	7	10	4	6	2	13	2	293.5
6	(Japan) Suzuki	16	12	13	8	Ret	11	C	15	9	4	13	11	10	14	9	Ret	14	9	Ret	10	9	5	5	3	11	11	Ret	10	136.5
Pos.	Manufacturer	AUS (Australia)		ITA (Italy)		NED (Netherlands)		ITA (Italy)		EUR (United Kingdom)		USA (United States)		SMR (San Marino)		SPA (Spain)		CZE (Czech Republic)		GBR (United Kingdom)		RUS (Russia)		GER (Germany)		POR (Portugal)		FRA (France)		Pts

- The second races at Monza and Silverstone were stopped early and half points were awarded.
