= Ferruccio Lamborghini (motorcyclist) =

Italian motorcycle racer (born 1991)

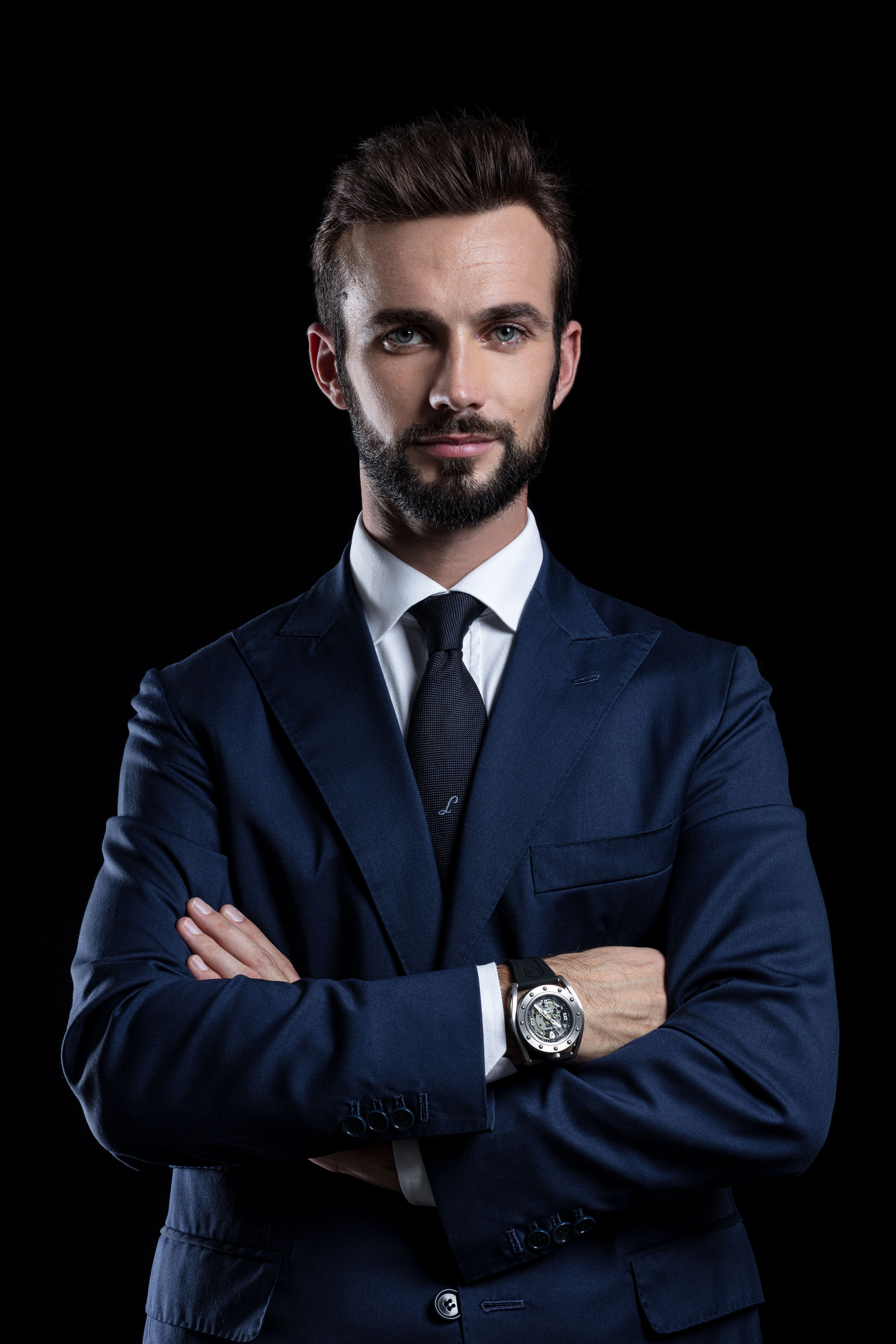
- Ferruccio Lamborghini II
- Nationality: Italian
- Born: 9 January 1991 (age 35); Bologna, Italy
Motorcycle racing career statistics
Moto2 World Championship
Active years	2010
Manufacturers	Suter, Moriwaki
Starts / Wins / Podiums / Poles / F. laps / Points; 5 / 0 / 0 / 0 / 0 / 0
125cc World Championship
Active years	2007–2008
Manufacturers	Aprilia
Starts / Wins / Podiums / Poles / F. laps / Points; 5 / 0 / 0 / 0 / 0 / 0
Supersport World Championship
Active years	2014
Manufacturers	Honda
Starts / Wins / Podiums / Poles / F. laps / Points; 1 / 0 / 0 / 0 / 0 / 0

Ferruccio Lamborghini II (born 9 January 1991) is an Italian motorcycle racer who has competed in the 125cc World Championship, the Moto2 World Championship, the Supersport World Championship, the FIM Superstock 1000 Cup and the European Superstock 600 Championship. He won the CIV Moto2 Championship in 2012.

Lamborghini is the grandson and namesake of the founder of Automobili Lamborghini, Ferruccio Lamborghini; and is the brother of singer Elettra Lamborghini.

== Career statistics ==
2009 - 23rd, European Superstock 600 Championship, Yamaha YZF-R6
2011 - 24th, FIM Superstock 1000 Cup, Honda CBR1000RR
2012 - 31st, European Superstock 600 Championship, Honda CBR600RR
2013 - NC, FIM Superstock 1000 Cup, Honda CBR1000RR

=== Grand Prix motorcycle racing ===
==== By season ====
Season	Class	Motorcycle	Team	Race	Win	Podium	Pole	FLap	Pts	Plcd
2007	125cc	Aprilia	Junior GP Racing Dream	4	0	0	0	0	0	NC
2007	125cc	Aprilia	Skilled Racing Team	4	0	0	0	0	0	NC
2008	125cc	Aprilia	Junior GP Racing Dream	1	0	0	0	0	0	NC
2010	Moto2	Suter	Forward Racing	5	0	0	0	0	0	NC
2010	Moto2	Moriwaki	Matteoni Racing	5	0	0	0	0	0	NC
Total				**10**	**0**	**0**	**0**	**0**	**0**	

==== Races by year ====
(key) (Races in bold indicate pole position) (Races in italics indicate fastest lap)

Year	Class	Bike	1	2	3	4	5	6	7	8	9	10	11	12	13	14	15	16	17	Pos.	Pts
2007	125cc	Aprilia	QAT	SPA	TUR	CHN	FRA	ITA	CAT	GBR	NED	GER	CZE	RSM; 24	POR	JPN	AUS; 25	MAL; 27	VAL; 28	NC	0
2008	125cc	Aprilia	QAT	SPA	POR	CHN	FRA	ITA; 33	CAT	GBR	NED	GER	CZE	RSM	INP	JPN	AUS	MAL	VAL	NC	0
2010	Moto2	Suter	QAT	SPA	FRA	ITA	GBR	NED	CAT	GER	CZE	INP	RSM; 23	ARA						NC	0
2010	Moto2	Moriwaki													JPN; 33	MAL; Ret	AUS	POR; 27	VAL; Ret	NC	0

=== European Superstock 600 ===
==== Races by year ====
(key) (Races in bold indicate pole position, races in italics indicate fastest lap)

Year	Bike	1	2	3	4	5	6	7	8	9	10	Pos	Pts
2009	Yamaha	VAL	ASS	MON; **DSQ**	MIS; **Ret**	SIL	BRN	NÜR	IMO; 9	MAG	POR	23rd	7
2012	Honda	IMO	ASS	MNZ	MIS	ARA	BRN; 9	SIL	NÜR	POR	MAG	31st	7

=== Superstock 1000 Cup ===
==== Races by year ====
(key) (Races in bold indicate pole position) (Races in italics indicate fastest lap)

Year	Bike	1	2	3	4	5	6	7	8	9	10	Pos	Pts
2011	Honda	NED	MNZ	SMR	ARA	BRN; 12	SIL; 17	NŰR; 14	IMO; 15	MAG	ALG	24th	7
2013	Honda	ARA	NED	MNZ; Ret	ALG	IMO	SIL	SIL	NŰR	MAG	JER	NC	0

=== Supersport World Championship ===
==== Races by year ====
(key) (Races in bold indicate pole position) (Races in italics indicate fastest lap)

Year	Bike	1	2	3	4	5	6	7	8	9	10	11	Pos.	Pts
2014	Honda	AUS	SPA	NED	ITA	GBR	MAL	SMR; 22	POR	SPA	FRA	QAT	NC	0
