= 2011 FIM Superstock 1000 Cup =

2011 FIM Superstock 1000 Cup
Previous:	2010	Next:	2012
Support series: Superbike World Championship; Supersport World Championship; European Superstock 600 Championship; European Junior Cup

The 2011 FIM Superstock 1000 Cup was the thirteenth season of the FIM Superstock 1000 Cup, the seventh held under this name. The championship, a support class to the Superbike World Championship at its European rounds, used 1000 cc motorcycles and was reserved for riders between 16 and 26 years of age. The season was contested over ten races, beginning at TT Circuit Assen on 17 April and ending at Algarve International Circuit on 16 October.

== Race calendar and results ==
2011 calendar
Round	Country	Circuit	Date	Pole position	Fastest lap	Winning rider	Winning team	Report
1	Netherlands	TT Circuit Assen	17 April	(France) Sylvain Barrier	(France) Sylvain Barrier	(Italy) Davide Giugliano	Althea Racing	Report
2	Italy	Autodromo Nazionale Monza	8 May	(Italy) Davide Giugliano	(Italy) Davide Giugliano	(Italy) Lorenzo Zanetti	BMW Motorrad Italia Superstock	Report
3	San Marino	Misano World Circuit Marco Simoncelli	12 June	(Italy) Danilo Petrucci	(Italy) Davide Giugliano	(Italy) Davide Giugliano	Althea Racing	Report
4	Spain	MotorLand Aragón	19 June	(Italy) Danilo Petrucci	(Italy) Niccolò Canepa	(Italy) Davide Giugliano	Althea Racing	Report
5	Czech Republic	Masaryk Circuit	10 July	(Italy) Danilo Petrucci	(Italy) Danilo Petrucci	(France) Sylvain Barrier	BMW Motorrad Italia Superstock	Report
6	United Kingdom	Silverstone Circuit	31 July	(Italy) Danilo Petrucci	(Italy) Danilo Petrucci	(Italy) Danilo Petrucci	Barni Racing Team	Report
7	Germany	Nürburgring	4 September	(Italy) Davide Giugliano	(Italy) Davide Giugliano	(Italy) Davide Giugliano	Althea Racing	Report
8	Italy	Autodromo Enzo e Dino Ferrari	25 September	(Italy) Davide Giugliano	(Italy) Davide Giugliano	(Italy) Danilo Petrucci	Barni Racing Team	Report
9	France	Circuit de Nevers Magny-Cours	2 October	(Italy) Danilo Petrucci	(Italy) Lorenzo Zanetti	(Italy) Danilo Petrucci	Barni Racing Team	Report
10	Portugal	Algarve International Circuit	16 October	(Italy) Danilo Petrucci	(Italy) Danilo Petrucci	(Italy) Danilo Petrucci	Barni Racing Team	Report

== Entry list ==
2011 entry list
Team	Constructor	Motorcycle	No.	Rider	Rounds
Baru Racing Team	BMW	BMW S1000RR	119	(Italy) Michele Magnoni	2–3, 8
BMW Motorrad Italia Superstock	BMW	BMW S1000RR	20	(France) Sylvain Barrier	All
BMW Motorrad Italia Superstock	BMW	BMW S1000RR	87	(Italy) Lorenzo Zanetti	All
EFFE Racing	BMW	BMW S1000RR	91	(Italy) Riccardo Fusco	2
Galvin Racing Team96	BMW	BMW S1000RR	96	(Italy) Jonathan Gallina	5
Garnier Alpha Racing Team	BMW	BMW S1000RR	17	(Canada) Brett McCormick	9–10
Garnier Alpha Racing Team	BMW	BMW S1000RR	21	(Germany) Markus Reiterberger	All
Garnier Racing Team	BMW	BMW S1000RR	39	(France) Randy Pagaud	All
Garnier Racing Team	BMW	BMW S1000RR	86	(Australia) Beau Beaton	All
Limited Motorsport	BMW	BMW S1000RR	64	(Brazil) Danilo Andric Silva	8, 10
Salač Racing	BMW	BMW S1000RR	16	(Czech Republic) Michal Šembera	5
Salač Racing	BMW	BMW S1000RR	22	(Switzerland) Jonathan Crea	8
Salač Racing	BMW	BMW S1000RR	33	(Switzerland) Michaël Savary	7, 9
Salač Racing	BMW	BMW S1000RR	89	(Czech Republic) Michal Salač	2–3, 6
Team ASPI	BMW	BMW S1000RR	93	(France) Matthieu Lussiana	1–7, 9–10
Team Piellemoto	BMW	BMW S1000RR	15	(Italy) Fabio Massei	All
Althea Racing	Ducati	Ducati 1098R	14	(Italy) Lorenzo Baroni	All
Althea Racing	Ducati	Ducati 1098R	34	(Italy) Davide Giugliano	1–9
Barni Racing Team	Ducati	Ducati 1098R	9	(Italy) Danilo Petrucci	All
Lazio MotorSport	Ducati	Ducati 1098R	37	(Italy) Andrea Boscoscuro	1–3
Lazio MotorSport	Ducati	Ducati 1098R	59	(Italy) Niccolò Canepa	4–10
SK Energy Team	Ducati	Ducati 1098R	55	(Slovakia) Tomáš Svitok	All
Adrenalin H-Moto Team	Honda	Honda CBR1000RR	40	(Hungary) Alen Győrfi	All
Berclaz Racing Team	Honda	Honda CBR1000RR	58	(Switzerland) Gabriel Berclaz	2–3, 8
Bogdanka PTR Honda	Honda	Honda CBR1000RR	74	(United Kingdom) Kieran Clarke	7, 9
Bogdanka PTR Honda	Honda	Honda CBR1000RR	120	(Poland) Marcin Walkowiak	1–6
Bogdanka PTR Honda	Honda	Honda CBR1000RR	133	(Poland) Marek Szkopek	10
Domburg Racing	Honda	Honda CBR1000RR	71	(Netherlands) Roy ten Napel	All
HALSALL Racing Team	Honda	Honda CBR1000RR	10	(United Kingdom) Lee Costello	6
Orange Rules	Honda	Honda CBR1000RR	24	(Italy) Roberto Anastasia	3
Team Lorini; Lorini Team	Honda	Honda CBR1000RR	8	(Italy) Andrea Antonelli	All
Team Lorini; Lorini Team	Honda	Honda CBR1000RR	19	(Italy) Davide Fanelli	5
Team Lorini; Lorini Team	Honda	Honda CBR1000RR	29	(Italy) Daniele Beretta	1–4
Team Lorini; Lorini Team	Honda	Honda CBR1000RR	47	(Italy) Eddi La Marra	1–8
Ten Kate Junior Team	Honda	Honda CBR1000RR	23	(Italy) Luca Verdini	1–3
Ten Kate Junior Team	Honda	Honda CBR1000RR	28	(Italy) Ferruccio Lamborghini	5–8
Ten Kate Junior Team	Honda	Honda CBR1000RR	65	(France) Loris Baz	9–10
BWG Racing Kawasaki	Kawasaki	Kawasaki ZX-10R	27	(Switzerland) Thomas Caiani	1–6, 8
BWG Racing Kawasaki	Kawasaki	Kawasaki ZX-10R	31	(Sweden) Christoffer Bergman	7, 9–10
BWG Racing Kawasaki	Kawasaki	Kawasaki ZX-10R	107	(Italy) Niccolò Rosso	10
CN Racing	Kawasaki	Kawasaki ZX-10R	4	(United States) Taylor Knapp	6, 10
Goeleven	Kawasaki	Kawasaki ZX-10R	7	(Spain) Dani Rivas	8–10
Goeleven	Kawasaki	Kawasaki ZX-10R	12	(Italy) Nico Vivarelli	1–4
Goeleven	Kawasaki	Kawasaki ZX-10R	23	(Italy) Luca Verdini	5–6
Goeleven	Kawasaki	Kawasaki ZX-10R	59	(Italy) Niccolò Canepa	1–3
Goeleven	Kawasaki	Kawasaki ZX-10R	83	(United Kingdom) Danny Buchan	5–6
Goeleven	Kawasaki	Kawasaki ZX-10R	107	(Italy) Niccolò Rosso	7–9
Goeleven	Kawasaki	Kawasaki ZX-10R	111	(Spain) Pere Tutusaus	4
Jar Racing Team	Kawasaki	Kawasaki ZX-10R	141	(Portugal) Sérgio Batista	2–4, 10
Kawasaki Racing Team	Kawasaki	Kawasaki ZX-10R	303	(United Kingdom) Keith Farmer	6–7
Lorenzini by Leoni	Kawasaki	Kawasaki ZX-10R	6	(Italy) Lorenzo Savadori	All
Lorenzini by Leoni	Kawasaki	Kawasaki ZX-10R	32	(South Africa) Sheridan Morais	All
Moto 39 Competition	Kawasaki	Kawasaki ZX-10R	70	(France) Romain Maitre	9
Pedercini Team; Team Pedercini	Kawasaki	Kawasaki ZX-10R	5	(Italy) Marco Bussolotti	All
Pedercini Team; Team Pedercini	Kawasaki	Kawasaki ZX-10R	36	(Argentina) Leandro Mercado	All
Pedercini Team; Team Pedercini	Kawasaki	Kawasaki ZX-10R	67	(Australia) Bryan Staring	All
C.S.M. Bucharest	Yamaha	Yamaha YZF-R1	30	(Romania) Bogdan Vrăjitoru	1–5, 7–9
MRS Yamaha Racing France	Yamaha	Yamaha YZF-R1	11	(France) Jérémy Guarnoni	All

Key
Regular rider
Wildcard rider
Replacement rider

- All entries used Pirelli tyres.

== Championship standings ==
=== Riders' standings ===
Pos.	Rider	Bike	ASS (Netherlands)	MON (Italy)	MIS (San Marino)	ARA (Spain)	BRN (Czech Republic)	SIL (United Kingdom)	NÜR (Germany)	IMO (Italy)	MAG (France)	POR (Portugal)	Pts
1	(Italy) Davide Giugliano	Ducati	1	**2**	1	1	2	Ret	**1**	**2**	5		171
2	(Italy) Danilo Petrucci	Ducati	2	4	**2**	**3**	**Ret**	**1**	Ret	1	**1**	**1**	169
3	(Italy) Lorenzo Zanetti	BMW	9	1	3	2	3	2	4	Ret	2	5	148
4	(France) Sylvain Barrier	BMW	**3**	DNS	4	5	1	Ret	2	5	3	2	132
5	(Italy) Niccolò Canepa	Kawasaki	10	9	5								109
5	(Italy) Niccolò Canepa	Ducati				4	5	3	3	3	4	Ret	109
6	(Italy) Andrea Antonelli	Honda	6	8	Ret	6	9	7	7	11	7	6	77
7	(Italy) Lorenzo Baroni	Ducati	4	Ret	12	9	7	4	5	4	Ret	12	74
8	(Germany) Markus Reiterberger	BMW	17	6	19	7	4	6	6	6	14	11	69
9	(Italy) Fabio Massei	BMW	16	5	7	10	6	13	11	9	6	8	69
10	(South Africa) Sheridan Morais	Kawasaki	11	DNS	13	Ret	8	8	8	7	8	3	65
11	(Australia) Bryan Staring	Kawasaki	5	DNS	11	8	Ret	12	10	12	11	4	56
12	(Italy) Marco Bussolotti	Kawasaki	14	7	9	16	13	11	9	13	9	9	50
13	(Italy) Michele Magnoni	BMW		3	6					8			34
14	(Italy) Eddi La Marra	Honda	7	DNS	8	12	Ret	9	12	Ret			32
15	(Italy) Lorenzo Savadori	Kawasaki	15	13	10	Ret	10	26	13	10	10	Ret	31
16	(Argentina) Leandro Mercado	Kawasaki	Ret	DNS	15	14	17	5	17	14	15	13	20
17	(France) Jérémy Guarnoni	Yamaha	12	Ret	16	11	16	10	15	16	17	Ret	16
18	(Italy) Luca Verdini	Honda	13	11	14								11
18	(Italy) Luca Verdini	Kawasaki					15	18					11
19	(France) Loris Baz	Honda									Ret	7	9
20	(Canada) Brett McCormick	BMW									13	10	9
21	(Netherlands) Roy ten Napel	Honda	8	21	20	22	19	Ret	Ret	22	24	21	8
22	(Slovakia) Tomáš Svitok	Ducati	23	17	17	13	11	20	20	19	16	20	8
23	(France) Matthieu Lussiana	BMW	19	10	Ret	17	Ret	15	Ret		Ret	Ret	7
24	(Italy) Ferruccio Lamborghini	Honda					12	17	14	15			7
25	(Switzerland) Michaël Savary	BMW							16		12		4
26	(Italy) Riccardo Fusco	BMW		12									4
27	(Australia) Beau Beaton	BMW	20	15	21	Ret	14	22	19	18	25	17	3
28	(Sweden) Christoffer Bergman	Kawasaki							Ret		20	14	2
29	(United Kingdom) Danny Buchan	Kawasaki					DNS	14					2
30	(Italy) Daniele Beretta	Honda	21	14	Ret	18							2
31	(Spain) Dani Rivas	Kawasaki								17	18	15	1
32	(France) Randy Pagaud	BMW	25	DNS	23	15	18	Ret	18	23	21	23	1
	(United States) Taylor Knapp	Kawasaki						Ret				16	0
	(United Kingdom) Keith Farmer	Kawasaki						16	Ret				0
	(Hungary) Alen Győrfi	Honda	22	16	Ret	20	Ret	19	22	26	23	19	0
	(Italy) Nico Vivarelli	Kawasaki	18	19	18	DNS							0
	(Brazil) Danilo Andric Silva	BMW								21		18	0
	(Switzerland) Gabriel Berclaz	BMW		18	25					24			0
	(United Kingdom) Kieran Clarke	Honda							21		19		0
	(Poland) Marcin Walkowiak	Honda	24	DNS	22	19	22	21					0
	(Italy) Niccolò Rosso	Kawasaki							23	20	DNS	Ret	0
	(Italy) Davide Fanelli	Honda					20						0
	(Switzerland) Thomas Caiani	Kawasaki	26	20	24	21	21	24		25			0
	(Poland) Marek Szkopek	Honda										22	0
	(France) Romain Maitre	Kawasaki									22		0
	(Czech Republic) Michal Salač	BMW		22	Ret			25					0
	(Romania) Bogdan Vrăjitoru	Yamaha	DNQ	23	26	25	23		24	DNQ	Ret		0
	(United Kingdom) Lee Costello	Honda						23					0
	(Spain) Pere Tutusaus	Kawasaki				23							0
	(Portugal) Sérgio Batista	Kawasaki		DNS	27	24						24	0
	(Italy) Andrea Boscoscuro	Ducati	Ret	DNS	Ret								0
	(Czech Republic) Michal Šembera	BMW					Ret						0
	(Italy) Roberto Anastasia	Honda			Ret								0
	(Italy) Jonathan Gallina	BMW					DNS						0
	(Switzerland) Jonathan Crea	BMW								DNQ			0
Pos.	Rider	Bike	ASS (Netherlands)	MON (Italy)	MIS (San Marino)	ARA (Spain)	BRN (Czech Republic)	SIL (United Kingdom)	NÜR (Germany)	IMO (Italy)	MAG (France)	POR (Portugal)	Pts

Colour	Result
Gold	Winner
Silver	Second place
Bronze	Third place
Green	Points classification
Blue	Non-points classification
Blue	Non-classified finish (NC)
Purple	Retired, not classified (Ret)
Red	Did not qualify (DNQ)
Red	Did not pre-qualify (DNPQ)
Black	Disqualified (DSQ)
White	Did not start (DNS)
White	Withdrew (WD)
White	Race cancelled (C)
Blank	Did not practice (DNP)
Blank	Did not arrive (DNA)
Blank	Excluded (EX)

**Bold** – Pole position
Italics – Fastest lap

=== Manufacturers' championship ===
Pos.	Manufacturer	ASS (Netherlands)	MON (Italy)	MIS (San Marino)	ARA (Spain)	BRN (Czech Republic)	SIL (United Kingdom)	NÜR (Germany)	IMO (Italy)	MAG (France)	POR (Portugal)	Pts
1	(Italy) Ducati	1	2	1	1	2	1	1	1	1	1	240
2	(Germany) BMW	3	1	3	2	1	2	2	5	2	2	193
3	(Japan) Kawasaki	5	7	5	8	8	5	8	7	8	3	99
4	(Japan) Honda	6	8	8	6	9	7	7	11	7	6	85
5	(Japan) Yamaha	12	23	16	11	16	10	15	16	17	Ret	16
Pos.	Manufacturer	ASS (Netherlands)	MON (Italy)	MIS (San Marino)	ARA (Spain)	BRN (Czech Republic)	SIL (United Kingdom)	NÜR (Germany)	IMO (Italy)	MAG (France)	POR (Portugal)	Pts
