= 2013 FIM Superstock 1000 Cup =

2013 FIM Superstock 1000 Cup
Previous:	2012	Next:	2014
Support series: Superbike World Championship; Supersport World Championship; European Superstock 600 Championship; European Junior Cup

The 2013 FIM Superstock 1000 Cup was the fifteenth season of the FIM Superstock 1000 Cup, the ninth held under this name. It began on 7 April at Aragón and finished on 20 October in Jerez after 9 rounds. Sylvain Barrier returned on the BMW he won the title with in 2012. The first few rounds were hotly contested between Barrier, Eddi La Marra and his teammate and former Superstock 1000 champion Niccolò Canepa. Unfortunately for La Marra, he would have a massive accident during testing which left him with in a coma and unable to complete the final three rounds of the championship on his Ducati Panigale. Barrier won 5 of the 9 races to retain his championship title, doing so at his home event at Magny-Cours. Despite skipping the final round at Jerez – to compete in the Superbike World Championship event – Barrier beat Canepa to the title by 24 points, with Jérémy Guarnoni a further point behind in third place.

== Race calendar ==
The provisional race schedule was publicly announced by the FIM on 6 October 2012 with nine confirmed rounds and one other round pending confirmation. On 8 March 2013, the FIM issued a definitive calendar, confirming rounds at Portimão and Imola that were previously subject to contract, as well as reducing the number of venues from ten to nine, but a second race was later added to the schedule of the Silverstone round. The series supported the Superbike World Championship at every meeting except Phillip Island, Donington Park, Moscow Raceway, Istanbul Park and Laguna Seca.

Round		Country	Circuit	Date	Pole position	Fastest lap	Winning rider	Winning team
1		Spain	Motorland Aragón	14 April	(France) Sylvain Barrier	(Italy) Lorenzo Savadori	(France) Sylvain Barrier	BMW Motorrad GoldBet STK
2		Netherlands	TT Circuit Assen	28 April	(Italy) Eddi La Marra	(Italy) Niccolò Canepa	(Italy) Eddi La Marra	Barni Racing Team
3		Italy	Autodromo Nazionale Monza	12 May	(France) Sylvain Barrier	(Italy) Lorenzo Savadori	(Italy) Lorenzo Savadori	Team Pedercini
4		Portugal	Algarve International Circuit	9 June	(France) Sylvain Barrier	(France) Sylvain Barrier	(France) Sylvain Barrier	BMW Motorrad GoldBet STK
5		Italy	Autodromo Enzo e Dino Ferrari	30 June	(France) Sylvain Barrier	(Italy) Eddi La Marra	(France) Sylvain Barrier	BMW Motorrad GoldBet STK
6	R1	United Kingdom	Silverstone Circuit	4 August	(France) Sylvain Barrier	(Italy) Alessandro Andreozzi	(France) Sylvain Barrier	BMW Motorrad GoldBet STK
6	R2	United Kingdom	Silverstone Circuit	4 August	(France) Sylvain Barrier	(France) Sylvain Barrier	(France) Sylvain Barrier	BMW Motorrad GoldBet STK
7		Germany	Nürburgring	1 September	(France) Sylvain Barrier	(France) Sylvain Barrier	(Argentina) Leandro Mercado	Team Pedercini
8		France	Circuit de Nevers Magny-Cours	6 October	(France) Jérémy Guarnoni	(Italy) Niccolò Canepa	(France) Jérémy Guarnoni	MRS Kawasaki
9		Spain	Circuito de Jerez	20 October	(France) Jérémy Guarnoni	(France) Jérémy Guarnoni	(France) Jérémy Guarnoni	MRS Kawasaki

== Championship standings ==
=== Riders' championship ===
Pos.	Rider	Bike	ARA (Spain)	ASS (Netherlands)	MNZ (Italy)	POR (Portugal)	IMO (Italy)	SIL (United Kingdom)		NÜR (Germany)	MAG (France)	JER (Spain)	Pts
1	(France) Sylvain Barrier	BMW	**1**	2	**DNS**	**1**	**1**	**1**	**1**	**2**	4		178
2	(Italy) Niccolò Canepa	Ducati	2	3	3	5	2	4	4	3	2	7	154
3	(France) Jérémy Guarnoni	Kawasaki	4	5	2	3	6	2	Ret	4	**1**	**1**	153
4	(Argentina) Leandro Mercado	Kawasaki	3	4	9	4	5	6	2	1	5	2	146
5	(Italy) Lorenzo Savadori	Kawasaki	Ret	8	1	Ret	4	5	3	7	3	24	98
6	(Czech Republic) Ondřej Ježek	Ducati	7	7	10	11	3	9	7	6	6	9	88
7	(Italy) Eddi La Marra	Ducati	5	**1**	4	2	Ret	3	Ret				85
8	(France) Romain Lanusse	Kawasaki	6	6	7	Ret	13	Ret	8	5	7	3	76
9	(Italy) Alessandro Andreozzi	Kawasaki	12	14	NC	7	8	7	5	12	12	4	64
10	(Italy) Marco Bussolotti	BMW	8	10	11	9	9	11	11	9	11	10	61
11	(France) Matthieu Lussiana	Kawasaki		11	6	6	DSQ	8	6	Ret	8	8	59
12	(Italy) Fabio Massei	Kawasaki				10							41
12	(Italy) Fabio Massei	Honda					7	12	14	8	9	11	41
13	(Sweden) Christoffer Bergman	Kawasaki	Ret	9	8	Ret	Ret	13	9	10	DNS		31
14	(South Africa) Greg Gildenhuys	BMW	10	Ret	DNS	12	10	14	12	11	Ret	12	31
15	(Luxembourg) Christophe Ponsson	Kawasaki		16	15	13	11	15	10	Ret	15	13	22
16	(South Africa) David McFadden	Honda	11	18									13
16	(South Africa) David McFadden	Kawasaki			Ret							23	13
16	(South Africa) David McFadden	BMW				8	Ret						13
17	(Germany) Markus Reiterberger	BMW										5	11
18	(Italy) Michele Magnoni	BMW			5								11
19	(Italy) Kevin Calia	Ducati									16	6	10
20	(Italy) Simone Grotzkyj	Kawasaki	18	20	16	17	12	17	16	13	23	14	9
21	(France) Randy Pagaud	Kawasaki	22	17	13	21	14	19	15	15	14	16	9
22	(Spain) Enrique Ferrer	BMW	9										7
23	(France) Stéphane Egea	Kawasaki									10		6
24	(Sweden) Filip Backlund	Kawasaki						10	Ret				6
25	(Germany) Marc Moser	Ducati	Ret	13	23	18	17	20	17	14	20	19	5
26	(Italy) Federico Dittadi	Kawasaki	13	21	14	20	DNS	23	DNS			DNS	5
27	(Hungary) Alen Győrfi	BMW	16	19	12	Ret	DNS				21		4
28	(Netherlands) Nigel Walraven	Suzuki		12									4
29	(Finland) Eeki Kuparinen	BMW		22	20			16	13	18	18	15	4
30	(France) Axel Maurin	Kawasaki									13		3
31	(Netherlands) Danny de Boer	Honda				14							2
32	(Switzerland) Sêbastien Suchet	Honda	20	15	Ret	15	16	18	18	16	DNS	18	2
33	(Italy) Massimo Parziani	Aprilia	Ret	Ret	22								1
33	(Italy) Massimo Parziani	BMW					15						1
34	(Sweden) Lukas Ockelfelt	Suzuki	15	Ret	19	Ret	DNS			Ret	17	20	1
	(Italy) Alberto Butti	Kawasaki	17	Ret	17	16	20	Ret	Ret	20	24	DNS	0
	(Romania) Robert Mureșan	BMW								17		17	0
	(Slovakia) Jaroslav Černý	Kawasaki					18	22	DNS	19			0
	(Italy) Remo Castellarin	BMW			18		Ret						0
	(Slovakia) Tomáš Svitok	Kawasaki	19	23	21	19							0
	(Slovakia) Tomáš Svitok	Ducati									19		0
	(Switzerland) Jonathan Crea	Kawasaki	23	25	24	Ret	19	21	19	21	22	21	0
	(Australia) Mitchell Pirotta	Kawasaki	21	24	25								0
	(Czech Republic) Karel Pešek	BMW								24			0
	(Czech Republic) Karel Pešek	Ducati										22	0
	(Portugal) Ivo Lopes	Suzuki				22							0
	(Germany) Marc Neumann	BMW								22			0
	(Germany) Marc Buchner	Suzuki								23			0
	(Spain) Pere Tutusaus	Kawasaki										25	0
	(Italy) Andrea Boscoscuro	Kawasaki			NC								0
	(Spain) Santiago Barragán	Kawasaki					Ret				Ret		0
	(Italy) Ferruccio Lamborghini	Honda			Ret								0
Pos.	Rider	Bike	ARA (Spain)	ASS (Netherlands)	MNZ (Italy)	POR (Portugal)	IMO (Italy)	SIL (United Kingdom)		NÜR (Germany)	MAG (France)	JER (Spain)	Pts

Colour	Result
Gold	Winner
Silver	Second place
Bronze	Third place
Green	Points classification
Blue	Non-points classification
Blue	Non-classified finish (NC)
Purple	Retired, not classified (Ret)
Red	Did not qualify (DNQ)
Red	Did not pre-qualify (DNPQ)
Black	Disqualified (DSQ)
White	Did not start (DNS)
White	Withdrew (WD)
White	Race cancelled (C)
Blank	Did not practice (DNP)
Blank	Did not arrive (DNA)
Blank	Excluded (EX)

**Bold** – Pole position
Italics – Fastest lap

=== Manufacturers' championship ===
Pos.	Manufacturer	ARA (Spain)	ASS (Netherlands)	MNZ (Italy)	POR (Portugal)	IMO (Italy)	SIL (United Kingdom)		NÜR (Germany)	MAG (France)	JER (Spain)	Pts
1	(Germany) BMW	1	2	5	1	1	1	1	2	4	5	200
2	(Japan) Kawasaki	3	4	1	3	4	2	2	1	1	1	198
3	(Italy) Ducati	2	1	3	2	2	3	4	3	2	6	176
4	(Japan) Honda	11	15	Ret	14	7	12	14	8	9	11	43
5	(Japan) Suzuki	15	12	19	22	DNS			23	17	20	5
	(Italy) Aprilia	Ret	Ret	22								0
Pos.	Manufacturer	ARA (Spain)	ASS (Netherlands)	MNZ (Italy)	POR (Portugal)	IMO (Italy)	SIL (United Kingdom)		NÜR (Germany)	MAG (France)	JER (Spain)	Pts

== Entry list ==
2013 entry list
Team	Constructor	Motorcycle	No.	Rider	Rounds
BMW Motorrad GoldBet STK	BMW	BMW S1000RR HP4	1	(France) Sylvain Barrier	1–8
BMW Motorrad GoldBet STK	BMW	BMW S1000RR HP4	34	(South Africa) Greg Gildenhuys	All
BMW Motorrad GoldBet STK	BMW	BMW S1000RR HP4	121	(Germany) Markus Reiterberger	9
Team BSR	Honda	Honda CBR1000RR	3	(Switzerland) Sébastien Suchet	All
Team Goeleven	Kawasaki	Kawasaki ZX-10R	4	(Sweden) Filip Backlund	6
Team Goeleven	Kawasaki	Kawasaki ZX-10R	19	(Australia) Mitchell Pirotta	1–3
Team Goeleven	Kawasaki	Kawasaki ZX-10R	43	(Italy) Fabio Massei	4
Team Goeleven	Kawasaki	Kawasaki ZX-10R	51	(Spain) Santiago Barragán	5, 8
Team Goeleven	Kawasaki	Kawasaki ZX-10R	93	(Italy) Alberto Butti	All
Team Goeleven	Kawasaki	Kawasaki ZX-10R	111	(Spain) Pere Tutusaus	9
Rider Promotion by T.Trasimeno	BMW	BMW S1000RR	5	(Italy) Marco Bussolotti	All
Barni Racing Team	Ducati	Ducati 1199 Panigale R	7	(Italy) Kevin Calia	8–9
Barni Racing Team	Ducati	Ducati 1199 Panigale R	47	(Italy) Eddi La Marra	1–6
Barni Racing Team	Ducati	Ducati 1199 Panigale R	59	(Italy) Niccolò Canepa	All
SK Energy – Fany Gastro	Kawasaki	Kawasaki ZX-10R	8	(Slovakia) Jaroslav Černý	5–7
SK Energy – Fany Gastro	Kawasaki	Kawasaki ZX-10R	55	(Slovakia) Tomáš Svitok	1–4
SK Energy – Fany Gastro	Ducati	Ducati 1199 Panigale R	9	(Czech Republic) Ondřej Ježek	All
SK Energy – Fany Gastro	Ducati	Ducati 1098R	10	(Czech Republic) Karel Pešek	9
SK Energy – Fany Gastro	Ducati	Ducati 1098R	55	(Slovakia) Tomáš Svitok	8
BMW Motorrad Czech Republic	BMW	BMW S1000RR	10	(Czech Republic) Karel Pešek	7
MRS Kawasaki	Kawasaki	Kawasaki ZX-10R	11	(France) Jérémy Guarnoni	All
MRS Kawasaki	Kawasaki	Kawasaki ZX-10R	23	(Luxembourg) Christophe Ponsson	All
Team OGP	Kawasaki	Kawasaki ZX-10R	12	(Switzerland) Jonathan Crea	All
Team OGP	Kawasaki	Kawasaki ZX-10R	39	(France) Randy Pagaud	All
T.R. Corse	Kawasaki	Kawasaki ZX-10R	14	(Italy) Andrea Boscoscuro	3
Pedercini Racing Team	Kawasaki	Kawasaki ZX-10R	15	(Italy) Simone Grotzkyj	All
AS Cast.16 Corse T.Velocisti	BMW	BMW S1000RR	16	(Italy) Remo Castellarin	3, 5
Pedercini Team	Kawasaki	Kawasaki ZX-10R	21	(Italy) Alessandro Andreozzi	All
Pedercini Team	Kawasaki	Kawasaki ZX-10R	45	(Italy) Federico Dittadi	1–6, 9
Delcamp Energie	Kawasaki	Kawasaki ZX-10R	24	(France) Stéphane Egea	8
Triple M by Ducati Frankfurt	Ducati	Ducati 1199 Panigale R	28	(Germany) Marc Moser	All
Team Pedercini	Kawasaki	Kawasaki ZX-10R	32	(Italy) Lorenzo Savadori	All
Team Pedercini	Kawasaki	Kawasaki ZX-10R	36	(Argentina) Leandro Mercado	All
H-Moto Team	BMW	BMW S1000RR	40	(Hungary) Alen Győrfi	1–5, 8
H-Moto Team	BMW	BMW S1000RR	95	(Romania) Robert Mureșan	7, 9
EAB Ten Kate Junior Team	Honda	Honda CBR1000RR	41	(Italy) Ferruccio Lamborghini	3
EAB Ten Kate Junior Team	Honda	Honda CBR1000RR	43	(Italy) Fabio Massei	5–9
EAB Ten Kate Junior Team	Honda	Honda CBR1000RR	44	(Netherlands) Danny de Boer	4
EAB Ten Kate Junior Team	Honda	Honda CBR1000RR	69	(South Africa) David McFadden	1–2
BWG Racing Kawasaki	Kawasaki	Kawasaki ZX-10R	69	(South Africa) David McFadden	3
BWG Racing Kawasaki	Kawasaki	Kawasaki ZX-10R	69	(South Africa) David McFadden	9
BWG Racing Kawasaki	Kawasaki	Kawasaki ZX-10R	71	(Sweden) Christoffer Bergman	1–8
Garnier Racing Team	BMW	BMW S1000RR	69	(South Africa) David McFadden	4–5
HPC Power Suzuki Racing	Suzuki	Suzuki GSX-R1000 K9	74	(Germany) Marc Buchner	7
HM Racing Team	Suzuki	Suzuki GSX-R1000 K9	75	(Portugal) Ivo Lopes	4
Amici Hoegee Suzuki	Suzuki	Suzuki GSX-R1000 K9	77	(Netherlands) Nigel Walraven	2
P.M.L. Racing Team	Aprilia	Aprilia RSV4 Factory	88	(Italy) Massimo Parziani	1–3
P.M.L. Racing Team	BMW	BMW S1000RR HP4	88	(Italy) Massimo Parziani	5
Team MRS Kawasaki	Kawasaki	Kawasaki ZX-10R	89	(France) Axel Maurin	8
Team MRS Kawasaki	Kawasaki	Kawasaki ZX-10R	98	(France) Romain Lanusse	All
EdgeZone Racing	Suzuki	Suzuki GSX-R1000 K9	90	(Sweden) Lukas Ockelfelt	1–5, 7–9
Motomarket Racing	BMW	BMW S1000RR	91	(Finland) Eeki Kuparinen	2–3, 6–9
Team Aspi	Kawasaki	Kawasaki ZX-10R	94	(France) Matthieu Lussiana	2–9
Targobank CNS Motorsport	BMW	BMW S1000RR	96	(Spain) Enrique Ferrer	1
G.M. Racing	BMW	BMW S1000RR	119	(Italy) Michele Magnoni	3
Neumann Racing Team	BMW	BMW S1000RR	777	(Germany) Marc Neumann	7

Key
Regular rider
Wildcard rider
Replacement rider

- All entries used Pirelli tyres.
