= Eeki Kuparinen =

Finnish motorcycle racer

- Nationality: Finnish
- Born: 19 March 1991 (age 35); Turku, Finland
- Current team: TACK KAWASAKI
- Bike number: 6

Eeki Kuparinen is a Grand Prix motorcycle racer from Finland. He races in the RFME Superstock 1000 Championship aboard a Kawasaki ZX-10R. In 2012 Kuparinen competed in the FIM Superstock 1000 Championship aboard a BMW, in two wildcard rides failed to finish in both, Kuparinen continued to make sporadic appearances in the 2013 FIM Superstock 1000 Championship with one point scoring finish of 13th in the second race at Silverstone.

== Career statistics ==
=== Career highlights ===
- 2012 - NC, FIM Superstock 1000 Cup, BMW S1000RR
- 2013 - 29th, FIM Superstock 1000 Cup, BMW S1000RR
- 2017 - NC, European Superstock 1000 Championship, Kawasaki ZX-10R

=== Grand Prix motorcycle racing ===
==== By season ====
Season	Class	Motorcycle	Team	Number	Race	Win	Podium	Pole	FLap	Pts	Plcd
2009	125cc	Honda	Ajo Motorsport Jr.	81	1	0	0	0	0	0	NC
Total					**1**	**0**	**0**	**0**	**0**	**0**	

==== Races by year ====
Year	Class	Bike	1	2	3	4	5	6	7	8	9	10	11	12	13	14	15	16	Pos	Points
2009	125cc	Honda	QAT	JPN	SPA	FRA	ITA	CAT	NED	GER; Ret	GBR	CZE	INP	RSM	POR	AUS	MAL	VAL	NC	0

=== Superstock 1000 Cup ===
==== Races by year ====
(key) (Races in bold indicate pole position) (Races in italics indicate fastest lap)

Year	Bike	1	2	3	4	5	6	7	8	9	10	Pos	Pts
2012	BMW	IMO	NED	MNZ	SMR	ARA	BRN; DNS	SIL	NŰR; Ret	ALG	MAG	NC	0
2013	BMW	ARA	NED; 22	MNZ; 20	ALG	IMO	SIL; 16	SIL; 13	NŰR; 18	MAG; 18	JER; 15	29th	4

=== European Superstock 1000 Championship ===
==== Races by year ====
(key) (Races in bold indicate pole position) (Races in italics indicate fastest lap)

Year	Bike	1	2	3	4	5	6	7	8	9	Pos	Pts
2017	Kawasaki	ARA	NED	IMO	DON	MIS	LAU	ALG	MAG	JER; 22	NC	0
