= Christoffer Bergman =

Swedish motorcycle racer

- Nationality: Swedish
- Born: 6 October 1989 (age 37); Karlstad, Sweden
- Current team: Wójcik Racing Team
- Bike number: 71
Motorcycle racing career statistics
Supersport World Championship
Active years	2016–2017, 2020–
Manufacturers	Honda, Yamaha
Championships	0
2021 championship position	14th (47 pts)
Starts / Wins / Podiums / Poles / F. laps / Points; 29 / 0 / 0 / 0 / 0 / 93

Christoffer Bergman (born 6 October 1989 in Karlstad) is a Swedish motorcycle racer.

== Career ==
As a four-year-old toddler, Bergman got his first motorcycle, a small motocross bike.

In 2009, Bergman made his debut as a roadracer and clinched the Swedish Championship in Super Stock 600 the following year. Since then, he has won races in Italian and French Super Stock 1000 on four occasions and has been tested driver for Swedish shock absorber manufacturer Öhlins since 2013.

In 2016, Bergman was the replacement for Luke Stapleford after Stapleford and the CIA Landlord Insurance Honda team parted ways. Bergman has previously participated in the FIM Superstock 1000 Cup.

== Career statistics ==
- 2011 - 28th, FIM Superstock 1000 Cup, Kawasaki ZX-10R
- 2012 - 7th, FIM Superstock 1000 Cup, Kawasaki ZX-10R
- 2013 - 13th, FIM Superstock 1000 Cup, Kawasaki ZX-10R
- 2014 - 17th, FIM Superstock 1000 Cup, Kawasaki ZX-10R
- 2015 - 10th, FIM Superstock 1000 Cup, Yamaha YZF-R1

=== Superstock 1000 Cup ===
==== Races by year ====
(key) (Races in bold indicate pole position) (Races in italics indicate fastest lap)

Year	Bike	1	2	3	4	5	6	7	8	9	10	Pos	Pts
2011	Kawasaki	NED	MNZ	SMR	ARA	BRN	SIL	NŰR; Ret	IMO	MAG; 20	ALG; 14	28th	2
2012	Kawasaki	IMO; Ret	NED; 8	MNZ; 2	SMR; 11	ARA; 9	BRN; 7	SIL; 6	NŰR; 7	ALG; 6	MAG; 6	7th	88
2013	Kawasaki	ARA; Ret	NED; 9	MNZ; 8	ALG; Ret	IMO; Ret	SIL; 13	SIL; 9	NŰR; 10	MAG; DNS	JER	13th	31
2014	Kawasaki	ARA; 4	NED	IMO	MIS	ALG	JER	MAG				17th	13
2015	Yamaha	ARA; 10	NED; 12	IMO; 12	DON; 11	ALG; 12	MIS; 7	JER; 17	MAG; 13			10th	35

=== Supersport World Championship ===
==== Races by year ====
(key) (Races in bold indicate pole position; races in italics indicate fastest lap)

Year	Bike	1	2	3	4	5	6	7	8	9	10	11	12	13	14	15	16	17	18	19	20	21	22	23	24	Pos	Pts
2016	Honda	AUS	THA	SPA	NED; 25	ITA; 24	MAL; 18	GBR; 16	ITA; 9	GER; 8	FRA; Ret	SPA; 9	QAT; 8													20th	30
2017	Honda	AUS	THA	SPA	NED	ITA	GBR	ITA	GER; 11	POR; 9	FRA; 12	SPA; 16	QAT; 16													24th	16
2020	Yamaha	AUS; Ret	SPA; DNS	SPA; DNS	POR	POR	SPA	SPA	SPA	SPA	SPA	SPA	FRA	FRA	POR	POR										NC	0
2021	Yamaha	SPA; 8	SPA; 6	POR; 10	POR; 11	ITA; Ret	ITA; 11	NED	NED	CZE	CZE	SPA; 15	SPA; 12	FRA; 22	FRA; 13	SPA; 12	SPA; Ret	SPA; C	SPA; 15	POR; DNS	POR; DNS	ARG	ARG	INA; Ret	INA; DNS	14th	47
