= Massimo Parziani =

Italian motorcycle racer

- Nationality: Italian
- Born: 10 July 1992 (age 34); Rovereto, Italy
Motorcycle racing career statistics
125cc World Championship
Active years	2011
Manufacturers	Aprilia
Championships	0
2011 championship position	NC (0 pts)
Starts / Wins / Podiums / Poles / F. laps / Points; 2 / 0 / 0 / 0 / 0 / 0

Massimo Parziani (born 10 July 1992 in Rovereto) is an Italian Grand Prix motorcycle racer.

== Career statistics ==
- 2012 - 26th, FIM Superstock 1000 Cup, Aprilia
- 2013 - 33rd, FIM Superstock 1000 Cup, Aprilia RSV4, BMW S1000RR

=== Grand Prix motorcycle racing ===
==== By season ====
Season	Class	Motorcycle	Team	Number	Race	Win	Podium	Pole	FLap	Pts	Plcd
2011	125cc	Aprilia	Faenza Racing	88	2	0	0	0	0	0	NC
Total					**2**	**0**	**0**	**0**	**0**	**0**	

==== Races by year ====
(key)

Yr	Class	Bike	1	2	3	4	5	6	7	8	9	10	11	12	13	14	15	16	17	Pos	Pts
2011	125cc	Aprilia	QAT	SPA	POR	FRA	CAT	GBR	NED	ITA; Ret	GER	CZE	INP	RSM; Ret	ARA	JPN	AUS	MAL	VAL	NC	0

=== Superstock 1000 Cup ===
==== Races by year ====
(key) (Races in bold indicate pole position) (Races in italics indicate fastest lap)

Year	Bike	1	2	3	4	5	6	7	8	9	10	Pos	Pts
2012	Aprilia	IMO; Ret	NED; Ret	MNZ; 17	SMR; 20	ARA; 17	BRN; 15	SIL; 15	NŰR; 17	ALG	MAG; 11	26th	7
2013	Aprilia/BMW	ARA; Ret	NED; Ret	MNZ; 22	ALG	IMO; 15	SIL	SIL	NŰR	MAG	JER	33rd	1
