= Alen Győrfi =

Hungarian motorcycle racer (born 1989)

- Nationality: Hungarian
- Born: 6 November 1989 (age 37); Subotica, Yugoslavia
- Current team: Forty Racing Team
- Bike number: 40
- Website: www.alen40.hu

Alen Győrfi (born 6 November 1989) is a Grand Prix motorcycle racer from Hungary. He was the European 125cc champion in 2007. In 2018, he was set to race in the Alpe-Adria Superstock 600 Championship aboard a Yamaha YZF-R6. In 2019, he competed in the long-distance Daytona 200, finishing 13th.

== Career statistics ==
- 2011 - NC, FIM Superstock 1000 Cup, Honda CBR1000RR
- 2012 - 16th, FIM Superstock 1000 Cup, Honda CBR1000RR
- 2013 - 27th, FIM Superstock 1000 Cup, BMW S1000RR

=== Grand Prix motorcycle racing ===
==== By season ====
Season	Class	Motorcycle	Team	Number	Race	Win	Podium	Pole	FLap	Pts	Plcd
2007	125cc	Aprilia	SuperBike Gyorsasagi M.S.E.	40	2	0	0	0	0	0	NC
2008	250cc	Honda	Motorcycle Competition Service	93	2	0	0	0	0	0	NC
2008	250cc	Aprilia	Team Toth Aprilia	93	2	0	0	0	0	0	NC
Total					**4**	**0**	**0**	**0**	**0**	**0**	

==== Races by year ====
(key) (Races in bold indicate pole position, races in italics indicate fastest lap)

Year	Class	Bike	1	2	3	4	5	6	7	8	9	10	11	12	13	14	15	16	17	Pos	Pts
2007	125cc	Aprilia	QAT	SPA	TUR; Ret	CHN	FRA	ITA	CAT	GBR	NED	GER	CZE	RSM	POR	JPN	AUS	MAL	VAL; 29	NC	0
2008	250cc	Honda	QAT	SPA	POR	CHN	FRA	ITA	CAT	GBR	NED	GER; 18	CZE	RSM; DNQ	INP	JPN	AUS	MAL	VAL	NC	0
2008	250cc	Aprilia	QAT	SPA	POR	CHN	FRA	ITA	CAT	GBR	NED	GER	CZE	RSM	INP	JPN	AUS	MAL	VAL; Ret	NC	0

=== Superstock 1000 Cup ===
==== Races by year ====
(key) (Races in bold indicate pole position) (Races in italics indicate fastest lap)

Year	Bike	1	2	3	4	5	6	7	8	9	10	Pos	Pts
2011	Honda	NED; 22	MNZ; 16	SMR; Ret	ARA; 20	BRN; Ret	SIL; 19	NŰR; 22	IMO; 26	MAG; 23	ALG; 19	NC	0
2012	Honda	IMO; 12	NED; Ret	MNZ; 6	SMR; 22	ARA; 14	BRN; 14	SIL; 12	NŰR; 11	ALG	MAG; Ret	16th	7
2013	BMW	ARA; 16	NED; 19	MNZ; 12	ALG; Ret	IMO; DNS	SIL	SIL	NŰR	MAG; 21	JER	27th	4
