= 2014 Assen Superbike World Championship round =

(Netherlands) 2014 Assen Superbike World Championship round
Round details
- Round 3 of 12 rounds in the 2014 Superbike World Championship. and Round 3 of 12 rounds in the 2014 Supersport World Championship.
- Date: 27 April, 2014
- Location: Assen
- Course: Permanent racing facility 4.542 km (2.822 mi)

Superbike World Championship
Pole position
(France) Loris Baz
1:34.357
Fastest lap race 1	Fastest lap race 2
(France) Sylvain Guintoli	(United Kingdom) Alex Lowes
1:36.440	1:52.975

Supersport World Championship
Pole position
(France) Florian Marino
1:38.106
Fastest lap
(Netherlands) Michael van der Mark
1:38.587

The 2014 Assen Superbike World Championship round was the third round of the 2014 Superbike World Championship. It took place over the weekend of 25–27 April 2014 at the TT Circuit Assen located in Assen, Netherlands.

== Superbike ==
=== Race 1 classification ===
Pos	No.	Rider	Bike	Laps	Time	Grid	Points
1	50	(France) Sylvain Guintoli	Aprilia RSV4 Factory	16	25:56.636	2	25
2	1	(United Kingdom) Tom Sykes	Kawasaki ZX-10R	16	+1.259	3	20
3	65	(United Kingdom) Jonathan Rea	Honda CBR1000RR	16	+4.116	5	16
4	76	(France) Loris Baz	Kawasaki ZX-10R	16	+4.459	1	13
5	24	(Spain) Toni Elías	Aprilia RSV4 Factory	16	+23.728	10	11
6	33	(Italy) Marco Melandri	Aprilia RSV4 Factory	16	+25.478	4	10
7	7	(United Kingdom) Chaz Davies	Ducati 1199 Panigale R	16	+26.533	12	9
8	91	(United Kingdom) Leon Haslam	Honda CBR1000RR	16	+26.696	11	8
9	22	(United Kingdom) Alex Lowes	Suzuki GSX-R1000	16	+27.971	9	7
10	59	(Italy) Niccolò Canepa	Ducati 1199 Panigale R EVO	16	+33.479	7	6
N/A^{1}	86	(Italy) Ayrton Badovini	Bimota BB3 EVO	16	+35.101	14	
11	23	(Italy) Luca Scassa	Kawasaki ZX-10R EVO	16	+40.689	20	5
12	44	(Spain) David Salom	Kawasaki ZX-10R EVO	16	+40.803	15	4
13	19	(United Kingdom) Leon Camier	BMW S1000RR EVO	16	+41.086	13	3
14	71	(Italy) Claudio Corti	MV Agusta F4 RR	16	+41.410	17	2
15	11	(France) Jérémy Guarnoni	Kawasaki ZX-10R EVO	16	+41.977	18	1
16	32	(South Africa) Sheridan Morais	Kawasaki ZX-10R EVO	16	+1:08.454	19	
17	21	(Italy) Alessandro Andreozzi	Kawasaki ZX-10R EVO	16	+1:19.067	23	
18	77	(Netherlands) Kervin Bos	Honda CBR1000RR EVO	16	+1:19.076	24	
19	99	(United States) Geoff May	EBR 1190 RX	16	+1:29.475	27	
20	10	(Hungary) Imre Tóth	BMW S1000RR	15	+1 lap	25	
Ret	84	(Italy) Michel Fabrizio	Kawasaki ZX-10R EVO	9	Retirement	21	
N/A^{1}	2	(United Kingdom) Christian Iddon	Bimota BB3 EVO	8	Accident	16	
Ret	58	(Republic of Ireland) Eugene Laverty	Suzuki GSX-R1000	6	Accident	8	
Ret	20	(United States) Aaron Yates	EBR 1190 RX	6	Retirement	26	
Ret	56	(Hungary) Péter Sebestyén	BMW S1000RR EVO	2	Retirement	28	
Ret	34	(Italy) Davide Giugliano	Ducati 1199 Panigale R	0	Accident	6	
DNS	9	(France) Fabien Foret	Kawasaki ZX-10R EVO	0	Did not start	22	
OFFICIAL SUPERBIKE RACE 1 REPORT

Notes:

- ^1 — Bimota entries were not eligible to score points and were removed from the race results.

=== Race 2 classification ===
Pos	No.	Rider	Bike	Laps	Time	Grid	Points
1	65	(United Kingdom) Jonathan Rea	Honda CBR1000RR	10	19:09.464	5	25
2	22	(United Kingdom) Alex Lowes	Suzuki GSX-R1000	10	+2.222	9	20
3	34	(Italy) Davide Giugliano	Ducati 1199 Panigale R	10	+4.955	6	16
4	1	(United Kingdom) Tom Sykes	Kawasaki ZX-10R	10	+13.089	3	13
5	91	(United Kingdom) Leon Haslam	Honda CBR1000RR	10	+13.639	11	11
6	33	(Italy) Marco Melandri	Aprilia RSV4 Factory	10	+18.041	4	10
7	76	(France) Loris Baz	Kawasaki ZX-10R	10	+21.837	1	9
8	7	(United Kingdom) Chaz Davies	Ducati 1199 Panigale R	10	+26.919	12	8
9	50	(France) Sylvain Guintoli	Aprilia RSV4 Factory	10	+32.766	2	7
10	59	(Italy) Niccolò Canepa	Ducati 1199 Panigale R EVO	10	+37.965	7	6
11	77	(Netherlands) Kervin Bos	Honda CBR1000RR EVO	10	+44.141	24	5
N/A^{1}	2	(United Kingdom) Christian Iddon	Bimota BB3 EVO	10	+1:12.574	16	
12	23	(Italy) Luca Scassa	Kawasaki ZX-10R EVO	10	+1:23.769	20	4
13	32	(South Africa) Sheridan Morais	Kawasaki ZX-10R EVO	10	+1:45.062	19	3
14	84	(Italy) Michel Fabrizio	Kawasaki ZX-10R EVO	9	+1 lap	21	2
15	44	(Spain) David Salom	Kawasaki ZX-10R EVO	9	+1 lap	15	1
16	10	(Hungary) Imre Tóth	BMW S1000RR	9	+1 lap	25	
Ret	58	(Republic of Ireland) Eugene Laverty	Suzuki GSX-R1000	7	Accident	8	
Ret	71	(Italy) Claudio Corti	MV Agusta F4 RR	6	Accident	17	
Ret	19	(United Kingdom) Leon Camier	BMW S1000RR EVO	6	Accident	13	
Ret	21	(Italy) Alessandro Andreozzi	Kawasaki ZX-10R EVO	4	Accident	23	
Ret	24	(Spain) Toni Elías	Aprilia RSV4 Factory	2	Accident	10	
Ret	9	(France) Fabien Foret	Kawasaki ZX-10R EVO	2	Retirement	22	
N/A^{1}	86	(Italy) Ayrton Badovini	Bimota BB3 EVO	0	Accident	14	
Ret	11	(France) Jérémy Guarnoni	Kawasaki ZX-10R EVO	0	Accident	18	
DNS	20	(United States) Aaron Yates	EBR 1190 RX		Did not start		
DNS	99	(United States) Geoff May	EBR 1190 RX		Did not start		
DNS	56	(Hungary) Péter Sebestyén	BMW S1000RR EVO		Did not start		
OFFICIAL SUPERBIKE RACE 2 REPORT

Notes:

- ^1 — Bimota entries were not eligible to score points and were removed from the race results.

== Supersport ==
=== Race classification ===
Pos	No.	Rider	Bike	Laps	Time	Grid	Points
1	60	(Netherlands) Michael van der Mark	Honda CBR600RR	18	29:47.030	3	25
2	21	(France) Florian Marino	Kawasaki ZX-6R	18	+9.494	1	20
3	16	(France) Jules Cluzel	MV Agusta F3 675	18	+14.988	4	16
4	88	(United Kingdom) Kev Coghlan	Yamaha YZF-R6	18	+17.131	6	13
5	26	(Italy) Lorenzo Zanetti	Honda CBR600RR	18	+17.430	7	11
6	44	(Italy) Roberto Rolfo	Kawasaki ZX-6R	18	+20.266	14	10
7	5	(Italy) Roberto Tamburini	Kawasaki ZX-6R	18	+20.662	12	9
8	35	(Italy) Raffaele De Rosa	Honda CBR600RR	18	+21.370	10	8
9	99	(United States) P. J. Jacobsen	Kawasaki ZX-6R	18	+23.557	9	7
10	19	(Germany) Kevin Wahr	Yamaha YZF-R6	18	+25.908	13	6
11	24	(Italy) Marco Bussolotti	Honda CBR600RR	18	+26.051	8	5
12	65	(Russia) Vladimir Leonov	MV Agusta F3 675	18	+27.815	15	4
13	14	(Thailand) Ratthapark Wilairot	Honda CBR600RR	18	+30.450	17	3
14	84	(Italy) Riccardo Russo	Honda CBR600RR	18	+39.705	11	2
15	61	(Italy) Fabio Menghi	Yamaha YZF-R6	18	+50.214	20	1
16	55	(Netherlands) Pepijn Bijsterbosch	Yamaha YZF-R6	18	+1:01.685	22	
17	7	(Spain) Nacho Calero	Honda CBR600RR	18	+1:02.043	21	
18	10	(Italy) Alessandro Nocco	Honda CBR600RR	18	+1:02.534	19	
19	89	(United Kingdom) Fraser Rogers	Honda CBR600RR	18	+1:21.586	23	
20	161	(Russia) Alexey Ivanov	Yamaha YZF-R6	17	+1 lap	24	
21	9	(Netherlands) Tony Coveña	Kawasaki ZX-6R	17	+1 lap	18	
Ret	54	(Turkey) Kenan Sofuoğlu	Kawasaki ZX-6R	12	Retirement	2	
Ret	4	(Republic of Ireland) Jack Kennedy	Honda CBR600RR	8	Retirement	5	
Ret	11	(Italy) Christian Gamarino	Kawasaki ZX-6R	5	Accident	16	
OFFICIAL SUPERSPORT REPORT

== Superstock ==
=== STK1000 race classification ===
Pos	No.	Rider	Bike	Laps	Time	Grid	Points
1	18	(Netherlands) Kevin Valk	Kawasaki ZX-10R	10	20:06.810	5	25
2	69	(Czech Republic) Ondřej Ježek	Ducati 1199 Panigale R	10	+6.219	3	20
3	94	(France) Mathieu Lussiana	Kawasaki ZX-10R	10	+7.074	8	16
4	32	(Italy) Lorenzo Savadori	Kawasaki ZX-10R	10	+7.782	1	13
5	36	(Argentina) Leandro Mercado	Ducati 1199 Panigale R	10	+10.894	2	11
6	169	(South Africa) David McFadden	Kawasaki ZX-10R	10	+10.967	17	10
7	98	(France) Romain Lanusse	Kawasaki ZX-10R	10	+11.248	6	9
8	43	(Italy) Fabio Massei	Ducati 1199 Panigale R	10	+39.049	4	8
9	34	(Hungary) Balázs Németh	Kawasaki ZX-10R	10	+39.445	15	7
10	77	(Netherlands) Nigel Walraven	Suzuki GSX-R1000	10	+45.521	7	6
11	4	(United States) Joshua Day	Honda CBR1000RR	10	+53.303	13	5
12	59	(Denmark) Alex Schacht	Ducati 1199 Panigale R	10	+1:00.509	18	4
13	39	(France) Randy Pagaud	Kawasaki ZX-10R	10	+1:08.401	20	3
14	41	(Italy) Federico D'Annunzio	BMW S1000RR	10	+1:12.689	14	2
15	7	(Switzerland) Jérémy Ayer	Kawasaki ZX-10R	10	+1:13.076	25	1
16	12	(Switzerland) Jonathan Crea	Kawasaki ZX-10R	10	+1:31.623	22	
17	27	(Italy) Riccardo Cecchini	BMW S1000RR	10	+1:46.808	11	
18	15	(Italy) Simone Grotzkyj	Kawasaki ZX-10R	10	+1:47.130	12	
19	90	(Spain) Javier Alviz	Kawasaki ZX-10R	10	+1:49.918	23	
Ret	95	(Austria) Julian Mayer	Kawasaki ZX-10R	7	Retirement	24	
Ret	11	(United Kingdom) Kyle Smith	Honda CBR1000RR	5	Accident	9	
Ret	16	(Italy) Remo Castellarin	BMW S1000RR HP4	2	Accident	16	
Ret	5	(Romania) Robert Mureșan	BMW S1000RR	2	Accident	10	
Ret	93	(Italy) Alberto Butti	Kawasaki ZX-10R	1	Accident	26	
Ret	3	(Switzerland) Sébastien Suchet	Kawasaki ZX-10R	0	Accident	19	
DNS	82	(Czech Republic) Karel Pešek	Ducati 1199 Panigale R	0	Did not start	21	
WD	28	(Germany) Marc Moser	Ducati 1199 Panigale R		Withdrew		
OFFICIAL SUPERSTOCK 1000 RACE REPORT
