= Çağrı =

- Gender: Unisex

Origin
- Language: Turkish
- Meaning: The Call, Appellation, Falcon

Çağrı is a unisex Turkish given name. In Turkish, "Çağrı" means "The Call", "Appellation", and/or "Distinction". It also means "Falcon". Notable people with the name include:

== Given name ==
- Çağrı Bey (989–1060), Seljuq ruler
- Çağrı Coşkun (born 1984), Turkish motorcycle racer
- Çağrı Şensoy (born 1986), Turkish actor

== Surname ==
- Mahir Çağrı (born 1962), Turkish internet celebrity
