= Massimo Roccoli =

Italian motorcycle racer

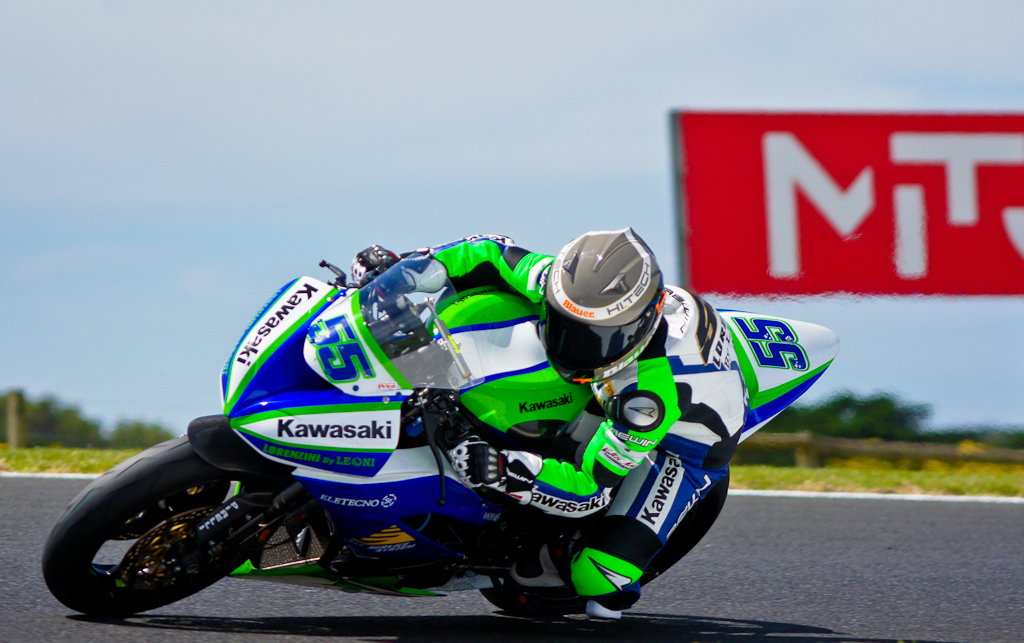
- Roccoli in 2011
- Nationality: Italian
- Born: 27 November 1984 (age 41); Rimini, Italy
- Current team: Pons Racing 40
- Bike number: 55
Motorcycle racing career statistics
Moto2 World Championship
Active years	2012
Manufacturers	Bimota
Starts / Wins / Podiums / Poles / F. laps / Points; 1 / 0 / 0 / 0 / 0 / 0
Superbike World Championship
Active years	2005, 2017
Manufacturers	Yamaha
Starts / Wins / Podiums / Poles / F. laps / Points; 4 / 0 / 0 / 0 / 0 / 1
Supersport World Championship
Active years	2004, 2006–2014, 2016, 2018–2019, 2021
Manufacturers	Yamaha, Honda, Kawasaki, MV Agusta
Starts / Wins / Podiums / Poles / F. laps / Points; 112 / 1 / 3 / 0 / 1 / 569

Massimo Roccoli (born 27 November 1984) is an Italian motorbike rider. He competes in the CIV Supersport 600 Championship aboard a Yamaha YZF-R6. He has competed in the Supersport World Championship in 2004, from 2006 to 2014, in 2016, 2018, 2019 and 2021, winning at a race during the 2006 season. He was the CIV Supersport champion in 2006, 2007, 2008, 2015, 2016 and 2018.

== Career statistics ==
=== CIV Championship (Campionato Italiano Velocita) ===
==== Races by year ====
(key) (Races in bold indicate pole position; races in italics indicate fastest lap)

Year	Class	Bike	1	2	3	4	5	6	Pos	Pts
2004	Stock 1000	Yamaha	MUG; 16	IMO; 10	**VAL1**; 3	**MIS**; 1	**VAL2**; 1		3rd	72
2005	Stock 1000	Yamaha	VAL; Ret	MON; 3	**IMO'**; 1	**MIS1**; 1	MUG; 1	MIS2; 5	2nd	102

=== Superstock European Championship ===
==== Races by year ====
(key) (Races in bold indicate pole position) (Races in italics indicate fastest lap)

Year	Bike	1	2	3	4	5	6	7	8	9	Pos	Pts
2004	Yamaha	VAL	SMR	MNZ	OSC	SIL	BRA	NED	IMO; 5	MAG	22nd	11

=== FIM Superstock 1000 Cup ===
==== Races by year ====
(key) (Races in bold indicate pole position) (Races in italics indicate fastest lap)

Year	Bike	1	2	3	4	5	6	7	8	9	10	Pos	Pts
2005	Suzuki	VAL; 3	MNZ; 2	SIL; 1	SMR; 4	BRN; 3	BRA; Ret	NED; 4	LAU; Ret	IMO; 9	MAG; 7	5th	119

=== Supersport World Championship ===
==== Races by year ====
(key) (Races in bold indicate pole position; races in italics indicate fastest lap)

Year	Bike	1	2	3	4	5	6	7	8	9	10	11	12	13	14	15	16	17	18	19	20	21	22	23	24	Pos	Pts
2004	Yamaha	SPA	AUS	SMR; 11	ITA; 11	GER	GBR	GBR	NED	ITA	FRA; 11															21st	15
2006	Yamaha	QAT; 7	AUS; 10	SPA; 8	ITA; 4	EUR; 6	SMR; 1	CZE; Ret	GBR; 9	NED; 8	GER; 12	ITA; 10	FRA; Ret													6th	96
2007	Yamaha	QAT; 7	AUS; 26	EUR; 8	SPA; 7	NED; 14	ITA; 11	GBR; Ret	SMR; 4	CZE; 4	GBR; 3	GER; 7	ITA; Ret	FRA; 10												6th	90
2008	Yamaha	QAT; Ret	AUS; 9	SPA; 7	NED; Ret	ITA; 7	GER; Ret	SMR; 7	CZE; 10	GBR; 8	EUR; 17	ITA; 17	FRA; 6	POR; Ret												12th	58
2009	Honda	AUS; 9	QAT; 8	SPA; 14	NED; 13	ITA; Ret	RSA; 12	USA; 23	SMR; 3	GBR; Ret	CZE; 7	GER; 4	ITA; Ret	FRA; 8	POR; Ret											11th	70
2010	Honda	AUS; 6	POR; 9	SPA; Ret	NED; 9	ITA; 11	RSA; Ret	USA; 13	SMR; 7	CZE; 12	GBR; 9	GER; 7	ITA; 6	FRA; 4												8th	84
2011	Kawasaki	AUS; Ret	EUR; 7	NED; 6	ITA; 9	SMR; Ret	SPA; 4	CZE; 15	GBR; 5	GER; 5	ITA; Ret	FRA; Ret	POR; 7													10th	71
2012	Yamaha	AUS; Ret	ITA; 9	NED; Ret	ITA; 7	EUR; 14	SMR; Ret	SPA				GER; 10	POR; 11	FRA; 15												15th	30
2012	Honda								CZE; Ret	GBR	RUS															15th	30
2013	Yamaha	AUS; 9	SPA; 12	NED; 13	ITA; DNS	GBR; Ret	POR; 12	ITA; 18	RUS; C	GBR; Ret	GER; 16	TUR; 14	FRA; 13	SPA; 17												20th	23
2014	MV Agusta	AUS	SPA	NED	ITA	GBR	MAL	ITA; 14	POR; 10	SPA; Ret	FRA; 15	QAT; 10														20th	15
2016	MV Agusta	AUS	THA	SPA	NED	ITA	MAL	GBR	ITA	GER	FRA	SPA	QAT; 9													27th	7
2018	Yamaha	AUS	THA	SPA	NED	ITA; Ret	GBR	CZE	ITA	POR	FRA	ARG	QAT													NC	0
2019	Yamaha	AUS	THA	SPA	NED	ITA; NC	SPA	ITA; 10	GBR	POR	FRA	ARG	QAT													26th	6
2021	Yamaha	SPA	SPA	POR	POR	ITA; Ret	ITA; 12	NED	NED	CZE	CZE	SPA	SPA	FRA	FRA	SPA	SPA	SPA	SPA	POR	POR	ARG	ARG	INA	INA	41st	4

=== Superbike World Championship ===
==== Races by year ====
(key) (Races in bold indicate pole position; races in italics indicate fastest lap)

Year	Bike	1		2		3		4		5		6		7		8		9		10		11		12		13		Pos	Pts
Year	Bike	R1	R2	R1	R2	R1	R2	R1	R2	R1	R2	R1	R2	R1	R2	R1	R2	R1	R2	R1	R2	R1	R2	R1	R2	R1	R2	Pos	Pts
2005	Yamaha	QAT	QAT	AUS	AUS	SPA	SPA	ITA	ITA	EUR; Ret	EUR; 15	SMR	SMR	CZE	CZE	GBR	GBR	NED	NED	GER	GER	ITA	ITA	FRA	FRA			40th	1
2017	Yamaha	AUS	AUS	THA	THA	SPA	SPA	NED	NED	ITA	ITA	GBR	GBR	ITA	ITA	USA	USA	GER; Ret	GER; 19	POR	POR	FRA	FRA	SPA	SPA	QAT	QAT	NC	0

=== Grand Prix motorcycle racing ===
==== Races by year ====
(key) (Races in bold indicate pole position; races in italics indicate fastest lap)

Year	Class	Bike	1	2	3	4	5	6	7	8	9	10	11	12	13	14	15	16	17	Pos	Pts
2012	Moto2	Bimota	QAT	SPA	POR	FRA	CAT	GBR	NED	GER	ITA; Ret	INP	CZE	RSM	ARA	JPN	MAL	AUS	VAL	NC	0
2022	MotoE	Energica	SPA1	SPA2	FRA1	FRA2	ITA1; 15	ITA2; 11	NED1	NED2	AUT1	AUT2	RSM1	RSM2						21st	6
2024	MotoE	Ducati	POR1; 6	POR2; 10	FRA1; Ret	FRA2; 13	CAT1; 10	CAT2; 11	ITA1; 7	ITA2; 4	NED1; 6	NED2; 10	GER1; 13	GER2; 11	AUT1; 9	AUT2; 11	RSM1; Ret	RSM2; DNS		13th	88

=== CIV National 600 ===
==== Races by year ====
(key) (Races in bold indicate pole position; races in italics indicate fastest lap)

Year	Bike	1		2		3		4		5		6		Pos	Pts
Year	Bike	R1	R2	R1	R2	R1	R2	R1	R2	R1	R2	R1	R2	Pos	Pts
2022	Yamaha	MIS; 3	MIS; 4	**VAL**; 1	**VAL**; 1	MUG; 6	MUG; 6	MIS2; 3	MIS2; 4	MUG2; 4	MUG2; C	IMO; 3	IMO; 4	2nd	172
