= Mahi Racing Team India =

Supersport World Championship team

- 2014 name: Mahi Racing Team India
- Base: (India) Vasant Kunj (United Kingdom) London and Yeovil
- Team principal/s: Mahendra Singh Dhoni; Nagarjuna
- Race riders: 54 Kenan Sofuoğlu; 99 Fabien Foret
- Motorcycle: Kawasaki Ninja ZX-6R
- Tyres: Pirelli

Mahi Racing Team India is a FIM Supersport World Championship team founded by the former captain of the Indian cricket team, Mahendra Singh Dhoni. The team entered the last rounds of the 2012 season under the name MSD R-N Racing Team India with two Kawasaki Ninja ZX-6R for wildcard riders Florian Marino and Dan Linfoot. Linfoot took the first podium finish for the team in the last round of the season in Magny-Cours. Telugu Film Star Actor Nagarjuna is also a key member of Mahi Racing Team India. For the 2013 season the team name changed to Mahi Racing Team India and two new riders were signed, the 2012 World Supersport champion Kenan Sofuoğlu and Fabien Foret.

In 2014, the team faced budget difficulties which led to teams withdrawal from the season.
