= 2014 Supersport World Championship =

2014 Supersport World Championship
| Previous: | 2013 | Next: | 2015 |
Support series: Superbike World Championship; FIM Superstock 1000 Cup; European Superstock 600 Championship; European Junior Cup

The 2014 Supersport World Championship was the sixteenth season of the Supersport World Championship—the eighteenth taking into account the two held under the name of Supersport World Series. It was run over 11 rounds, commencing on 23 February at Phillip Island in Australia and ending on 2 November at Losail in Qatar.

The riders' championship title was won for the first time by a Dutch rider, as Michael van der Mark of the Pata Honda World Supersport team won six races, and achieved ten top-two placings en route to the championship. Van der Mark finished 82 points clear of his nearest rival in the championship, MV Agusta Reparto Corse rider Jules Cluzel, who won a trio of races during the season. Third place in the championship went to Florian Marino of the Kawasaki Intermoto Ponyexpres team, who achieved four podiums in 2014. The season's other winners were van der Mark's team-mate Lorenzo Zanetti at Imola and Kenan Sofuoğlu, who won at Motorland Aragón for Mahi Racing Team India, before parting with the team before the end of the season. In the manufacturers' championship, Honda finished 70 points clear of the next best manufacturer, Kawasaki. The Pata Honda World Supersport team won the teams' championship by over 100 points ahead of the Kawasaki Intermoto Ponyexpres team.

== Race calendar and results ==
The Fédération Internationale de Motocyclisme released a 13-round provisional calendar on 29 November 2013. The 12-round updated version of the calendar, issued by the FIM on 12 April 2014, saw the cancellation of the Russian round and the inclusion of Qatar as the venue of the last event of the season.

On 31 July 2014, the Qatar round was confirmed by the Fédération Internationale de Motocyclisme, and was to be held under floodlights for its return to the calendar. On the same date, it was announced that the South African round – due to be held on 19 October at Phakisa Freeway in Welkom – was cancelled due to delays in achieving the FIM homologation requirements. It was later announced that the round would not be replaced on the calendar, reducing the season to 11 rounds.

| Round | Country | Circuit | Date | Pole position | Fastest lap | Winning rider | Winning team |
|---|---|---|---|---|---|---|---|
| 1 | Australia | Phillip Island Grand Prix Circuit | 23 February | (Turkey) Kenan Sofuoğlu | (Italy) Roberto Tamburini | (France) Jules Cluzel | MV Agusta RC–Yakhnich M. |
| 2 | Spain | Motorland Aragón | 13 April | (United Kingdom) Kev Coghlan | (France) Jules Cluzel | (Turkey) Kenan Sofuoğlu | Mahi Racing Team India |
| 3 | Netherlands | TT Circuit Assen | 27 April | (France) Florian Marino | (Netherlands) Michael van der Mark | (Netherlands) Michael van der Mark | Pata Honda World Supersport |
| 4 | Italy | Autodromo Enzo e Dino Ferrari | 11 May | (France) Jules Cluzel | (Turkey) Kenan Sofuoğlu | (Italy) Lorenzo Zanetti | Pata Honda World Supersport |
| 5 | United Kingdom | Donington Park | 25 May | (Netherlands) Michael van der Mark | (Netherlands) Michael van der Mark | (Netherlands) Michael van der Mark | Pata Honda World Supersport |
| 6 | Malaysia | Sepang International Circuit | 8 June | (France) Jules Cluzel | (United Kingdom) Kev Coghlan | (Netherlands) Michael van der Mark | Pata Honda World Supersport |
| 7 | Italy | Misano World Circuit Marco Simoncelli | 22 June | (France) Jules Cluzel | (United States) P. J. Jacobsen | (France) Jules Cluzel | MV Agusta Reparto Corse |
| 8 | Portugal | Autódromo Internacional do Algarve | 6 July | (Turkey) Kenan Sofuoğlu | (Netherlands) Michael van der Mark | (Netherlands) Michael van der Mark | Pata Honda World Supersport |
| 9 | Spain | Circuito de Jerez | 7 September | (Netherlands) Michael van der Mark | (Turkey) Kenan Sofuoğlu | (Netherlands) Michael van der Mark | Pata Honda World Supersport |
| 10 | France | Circuit de Nevers Magny-Cours | 5 October | (France) Jules Cluzel | (Turkey) Kenan Sofuoğlu | (France) Jules Cluzel | MV Agusta Reparto Corse |
| 11 | Qatar | Losail International Circuit | 2 November | (France) Jules Cluzel | (France) Jules Cluzel | (Netherlands) Michael van der Mark | Pata Honda World Supersport |

== Entry list ==
2014 entry list
| Team | Constructor | Motorcycle | No. | Rider | Rounds |
|---|---|---|---|---|---|
| Smiths Triumph | Triumph | Triumph 675 R | 3 | (Australia) Billy McConnell | 1 |
| Smiths Triumph | Triumph | Triumph 675 R | 81 | (United Kingdom) Graeme Gowland | 1 |
| CIA Insurance Honda | Honda | Honda CBR600RR | 4 | (Republic of Ireland) Jack Kennedy | All |
| CIA Insurance Honda | Honda | Honda CBR600RR | 7 | (Spain) Nacho Calero | All |
| CIA Insurance Honda | Honda | Honda CBR600RR | 35 | (Italy) Raffaele De Rosa | 2–9 |
| CIA Insurance Honda | Honda | Honda CBR600RR | 36 | (Colombia) Martín Cárdenas | 10 |
| CIA Insurance Honda | Honda | Honda CBR600RR | 77 | (Qatar) Nasser Al Malki | 11 |
| San Carlo Puccetti Racing | Kawasaki | Kawasaki ZX-6R | 5 | (Italy) Roberto Tamburini | All |
| San Carlo Puccetti Racing | Kawasaki | Kawasaki ZX-6R | 10 | (Italy) Alessandro Nocco | 2–10 |
| San Carlo Puccetti Racing | Kawasaki | Kawasaki ZX-6R | 15 | (Italy) Marco Faccani | 11 |
| San Carlo Puccetti Racing | Kawasaki | Kawasaki ZX-6R | 54 | (Turkey) Kenan Sofuoğlu | 9–11 |
| HAGN–SKM Racing Team | Yamaha | Yamaha YZF-R6 | 6 | (Switzerland) Dominic Schmitter | 2, 9–10 |
| Kawasaki Ponyexpres Intermoto | Kawasaki | Kawasaki ZX-6R | 9 | (Netherlands) Tony Coveña | 1–3 |
| Kawasaki Intermoto Ponyexpres | Kawasaki | Kawasaki ZX-6R | 9 | (Netherlands) Tony Coveña | 4–9 |
| Kawasaki Intermoto Ponyexpres | Kawasaki | Kawasaki ZX-6R | 21 | (France) Florian Marino | All |
| Kawasaki Intermoto Ponyexpres | Kawasaki | Kawasaki ZX-6R | 22 | (United Kingdom) Mason Law | 10–11 |
| Kawasaki Intermoto Ponyexpres | Kawasaki | Kawasaki ZX-6R | 99 | (United States) P. J. Jacobsen | All |
| Team Go Eleven | Kawasaki | Kawasaki ZX-6R | 11 | (Italy) Christian Gamarino | All |
| Team Go Eleven | Kawasaki | Kawasaki ZX-6R | 44 | (Italy) Roberto Rolfo | All |
| Core PTR Honda | Honda | Honda CBR600RR | 14 | (Thailand) Ratthapark Wilairot | All |
| Core PTR Honda | Honda | Honda CBR600RR | 35 | (Italy) Raffaele De Rosa | 1 |
| MV Agusta RC–Yakhnich M. MV Agusta Reparto Corse | MV Agusta | MV Agusta F3 675 | 16 | (France) Jules Cluzel | All |
| MV Agusta RC–Yakhnich M. MV Agusta Reparto Corse | MV Agusta | MV Agusta F3 675 | 65 | (Russia) Vladimir Leonov | 1–6 |
| MV Agusta RC–Yakhnich M. MV Agusta Reparto Corse | MV Agusta | MV Agusta F3 675 | 155 | (Italy) Massimo Roccoli | 7–11 |
| MG Competition | Yamaha | Yamaha YZF-R6 | 17 | (France) Lucas Mahias | 10 |
| DMC Panavto–Yamaha | Yamaha | Yamaha YZF-R6 | 17 | (France) Lucas Mahias | 11 |
| DMC Panavto–Yamaha | Yamaha | Yamaha YZF-R6 | 88 | (United Kingdom) Kev Coghlan | All |
| DMC Panavto–Yamaha | Yamaha | Yamaha YZF-R6 | 161 | (Russia) Alexey Ivanov | All |
| RS Wahr by Kraus Racing | Yamaha | Yamaha YZF-R6 | 19 | (Germany) Kevin Wahr | 1–5, 7, 10 |
| SIC Racing Team | Honda | Honda CBR600RR | 20 | (Malaysia) Zaqhwan Zaidi | 6 |
| Yohann Moto Sport | Suzuki | Suzuki GSX-R600 | 23 | (France) Cédric Tangre | 10 |
| Team Lorini | Honda | Honda CBR600RR | 24 | (Italy) Marco Bussolotti | 1–9 |
| Team Lorini | Honda | Honda CBR600RR | 25 | (Italy) Alex Baldolini | 10 |
| Team Lorini | Honda | Honda CBR600RR | 28 | (Italy) Ferruccio Lamborghini | 7 |
| Team Lorini | Honda | Honda CBR600RR | 35 | (Italy) Raffaele De Rosa | 11 |
| Team Lorini | Honda | Honda CBR600RR | 84 | (Italy) Riccardo Russo | 1–6 |
| Team Lorini | Honda | Honda CBR600RR | 87 | (Italy) Luca Marconi | 7 |
| Team Lorini | Honda | Honda CBR600RR | 87 | (Italy) Luca Marconi | 8–11 |
| ATK Racing | MV Agusta | MV Agusta F3 675 | 25 | (Italy) Alex Baldolini | 4, 7–8 |
| Pata Honda World Supersport | Honda | Honda CBR600RR | 26 | (Italy) Lorenzo Zanetti | All |
| Pata Honda World Supersport | Honda | Honda CBR600RR | 60 | (Netherlands) Michael van der Mark | All |
| Oz Wildcard Racing | Yamaha | Yamaha YZF-R6 | 52 | (Australia) Ryan Taylor | 1 |
| Com Plus SMS Racing | Honda | Honda CBR600RR | 53 | (France) Valentin Debise | 7–11 |
| Com Plus SMS Racing | Honda | Honda CBR600RR | 89 | (United Kingdom) Fraser Rogers | 1–6 |
| Mahi Racing Team India | Kawasaki | Kawasaki ZX-6R | 54 | (Turkey) Kenan Sofuoğlu | 1–8 |
| Langenscheid R. by Fast Bike | Yamaha | Yamaha YZF-R6 | 55 | (Netherlands) Pepijn Bijsterbosch | 3 |
| Team Torrentó | Yamaha | Yamaha YZF-R6 | 57 | (Spain) Ferran Casas | 9 |
| VFT Racing | Yamaha | Yamaha YZF-R6 | 61 | (Italy) Fabio Menghi | All |
| AARK Racing | Honda | Honda CBR600RR | 64 | (Australia) Matt Davies | 9–10 |
| Rivamoto | Honda | Honda CBR600RR | 65 | (Russia) Vladimir Leonov | 9–10 |
| Rivamoto | Honda | Honda CBR600RR | 67 | (Australia) Bryan Staring | 1 |
| Anvil Hire TAG Racing | Triumph | Triumph Daytona 675 | 94 | (United Kingdom) Sam Hornsey | 5 |

Key
Regular rider
Wildcard rider
Replacement rider

- All entries used Pirelli tyres.

== Championship standings ==
=== Riders' championship ===
| Pos | Rider | Bike | PHI (Australia) | ARA (Spain) | ASS (Netherlands) | IMO (Italy) | DON (United Kingdom) | SEP (Malaysia) | MIS (Italy) | POR (Portugal) | JER (Spain) | MAG (France) | LOS (Qatar) | Pts |
|---|---|---|---|---|---|---|---|---|---|---|---|---|---|---|
| 1 | (Netherlands) Michael van der Mark | Honda | Ret | 2 | 1 | 2 | **1** | 1 | 2 | 1 | **1** | 2 | 1 | 230 |
| 2 | (France) Jules Cluzel | MV Agusta | 1 | Ret | 3 | **15** | 2 | **2** | **1** | Ret | Ret | **1** | **3** | 148 |
| 3 | (France) Florian Marino | Kawasaki | 4 | 3 | **2** | 3 | 5 | Ret | 7 | 8 | 3 | 5 | 11 | 125 |
| 4 | (Italy) Lorenzo Zanetti | Honda | DNS | 4 | 5 | 1 | Ret | 5 | 6 | 6 | 6 | 4 | 7 | 112 |
| 5 | (United Kingdom) Kev Coghlan | Yamaha | 2 | **5** | 4 | Ret | 3 | Ret | 8 | 7 | 5 | 6 | 5 | 109 |
| 6 | (United States) P. J. Jacobsen | Kawasaki | Ret | 14 | 9 | 4 | 6 | 8 | 3 | 5 | 2 | 8 | 12 | 99 |
| 7 | (Italy) Roberto Rolfo | Kawasaki | 11 | 12 | 6 | 5 | 10 | 4 | 10 | 9 | 7 | 3 | 6 | 97 |
| 8 | (Turkey) Kenan Sofuoğlu | Kawasaki | **Ret** | 1 | Ret | Ret | 4 | 3 | 4 | **3** | 13 | Ret | 8 | 94 |
| 9 | (Thailand) Ratthapark Wilairot | Honda | Ret | 10 | 13 | Ret | 12 | 6 | 9 | 11 | 8 | 9 | 2 | 70 |
| 10 | (Italy) Raffaele De Rosa | Honda | 3 | 6 | 8 | 12 | 9 | 7 | 20 | 4 | Ret | | 13 | 70 |
| 11 | (Italy) Roberto Tamburini | Kawasaki | 5 | 7 | 7 | Ret | 8 | Ret | 5 | Ret | 10 | 7 | 9 | 70 |
| 12 | (Republic of Ireland) Jack Kennedy | Honda | Ret | 11 | Ret | 11 | 7 | Ret | 12 | 2 | 4 | Ret | Ret | 56 |
| 13 | (Italy) Marco Bussolotti | Honda | 14 | 16 | 11 | 7 | 11 | 10 | Ret | 13 | 19 | | | 30 |
| 14 | (Italy) Alessandro Nocco | Kawasaki | | Ret | 18 | 10 | 14 | 13 | 11 | 12 | 9 | Ret | | 27 |
| 15 | (Italy) Christian Gamarino | Kawasaki | 10 | 9 | Ret | 13 | 19 | 11 | 15 | 17 | 15 | 14 | 14 | 27 |
| 16 | (Germany) Kevin Wahr | Yamaha | 6 | Ret | 10 | 9 | Ret | | 13 | | | Ret | | 26 |
| 17 | (Italy) Riccardo Russo | Honda | 8 | Ret | 14 | 8 | 13 | 12 | | | | | | 25 |
| 18 | (Italy) Fabio Menghi | Yamaha | 9 | 15 | 15 | 6 | Ret | Ret | 17 | 15 | 17 | Ret | 18 | 20 |
| 19 | (Russia) Vladimir Leonov | MV Agusta | Ret | 8 | 12 | Ret | 15 | 14 | | | | | | 19 |
| 19 | (Russia) Vladimir Leonov | Honda | | | | | | | | | 12 | Ret | | 19 |
| 20 | (Italy) Massimo Roccoli | MV Agusta | | | | | | | 14 | 10 | Ret | 15 | 10 | 15 |
| 21 | (Switzerland) Dominic Schmitter | Yamaha | | 13 | | | | | | | 11 | 10 | | 14 |
| 22 | (France) Lucas Mahias | Yamaha | | | | | | | | | | Ret | 4 | 13 |
| 23 | (United Kingdom) Graeme Gowland | Triumph | 7 | | | | | | | | | | | 9 |
| 24 | (Malaysia) Zaqhwan Zaidi | Honda | | | | | | 9 | | | | | | 7 |
| 25 | (Netherlands) Tony Coveña | Kawasaki | 12 | 17 | 21 | 14 | 17 | 15 | 18 | 18 | 18 | | | 7 |
| 26 | (Italy) Luca Marconi | Honda | | | | | | | 21 | 16 | Ret | 11 | Ret | 5 |
| 27 | (United Kingdom) Mason Law | Kawasaki | | | | | | | | | | 12 | 15 | 5 |
| 28 | (France) Valentin Debise | Honda | | | | | | | 16 | 14 | 14 | 17 | Ret | 4 |
| 29 | (Australia) Matt Davies | Honda | | | | | | | | | 20 | 13 | | 3 |
| 30 | (Spain) Nacho Calero | Honda | 13 | 20 | 17 | 17 | DNS | Ret | 23 | 20 | 22 | 18 | 19 | 3 |
| 31 | (United Kingdom) Fraser Rogers | Honda | 15 | 18 | 19 | 16 | 18 | 16 | | | | | | 1 |
| | (Qatar) Nasser Al Malki | Honda | | | | | | | | | | | 16 | 0 |
| | (Colombia) Martín Cárdenas | Honda | | | | | | | | | | 16 | | 0 |
| | (Spain) Ferran Casas | Yamaha | | | | | | | | | 16 | | | 0 |
| | (United Kingdom) Sam Hornsey | Triumph | | | | | 16 | | | | | | | 0 |
| | (Netherlands) Pepijn Bijsterbosch | Yamaha | | | 16 | | | | | | | | | 0 |
| | (Australia) Ryan Taylor | Yamaha | 16 | | | | | | | | | | | 0 |
| | (Russia) Alexey Ivanov | Yamaha | 17 | 19 | 20 | Ret | 20 | Ret | Ret | 19 | 21 | Ret | 17 | 0 |
| | (Italy) Alex Baldolini | MV Agusta | | | | Ret | | | 19 | Ret | | | | 0 |
| | (Italy) Alex Baldolini | Honda | | | | | | | | | | Ret | | 0 |
| | (Italy) Ferruccio Lamborghini | Honda | | | | | | | 22 | | | | | 0 |
| | (Italy) Marco Faccani | Kawasaki | | | | | | | | | | | Ret | 0 |
| | (France) Cédric Tangre | Suzuki | | | | | | | | | | Ret | | 0 |
| | (Australia) Bryan Staring | Honda | Ret | | | | | | | | | | | 0 |
| | (Australia) Billy McConnell | Triumph | Ret | | | | | | | | | | | 0 |
| Pos | Rider | Bike | PHI (Australia) | ARA (Spain) | ASS (Netherlands) | IMO (Italy) | DON (United Kingdom) | SEP (Malaysia) | MIS (Italy) | POR (Portugal) | JER (Spain) | MAG (France) | LOS (Qatar) | Pts |

| Colour | Result |
|---|---|
| Gold | Winner |
| Silver | Second place |
| Bronze | Third place |
| Green | Points classification |
| Blue | Non-points classification |
| Blue | Non-classified finish (NC) |
| Purple | Retired, not classified (Ret) |
| Red | Did not qualify (DNQ) |
| Red | Did not pre-qualify (DNPQ) |
| Black | Disqualified (DSQ) |
| White | Did not start (DNS) |
| White | Withdrew (WD) |
| White | Race cancelled (C) |
| Blank | Did not practice (DNP) |
| Blank | Did not arrive (DNA) |
| Blank | Excluded (EX) |

**Bold** – Pole
Italics – Fastest Lap

=== Teams' championship ===
| Pos. | Teams | Bike No. | PHI (Australia) | ARA (Spain) | ASS (Netherlands) | IMO (Italy) | DON (United Kingdom) | SEP (Malaysia) | MIS (Italy) | POR (Portugal) | JER (Spain) | MAG (France) | LOS (Qatar) | Pts. |
|---|---|---|---|---|---|---|---|---|---|---|---|---|---|---|
| 1 | (Netherlands) Pata Honda World Supersport | 60 | Ret | 2 | 1 | 2 | **1** | 1 | 2 | 1 | **1** | 2 | 1 | 342 |
| 1 | (Netherlands) Pata Honda World Supersport | 26 | DNS | 4 | 5 | 1 | Ret | 5 | 6 | 6 | 6 | 4 | 7 | 342 |
| 2 | (Italy) Kawasaki Intermoto Ponyexpres | 21 | 4 | 3 | **2** | 3 | 5 | Ret | 7 | 8 | 3 | 5 | 11 | 229 |
| 2 | (Italy) Kawasaki Intermoto Ponyexpres | 99 | Ret | 14 | 9 | 4 | 6 | 8 | 3 | 5 | 2 | 8 | 12 | 229 |
| 2 | (Italy) Kawasaki Intermoto Ponyexpres | 9 | 12 | 17 | 21 | 14 | 17 | 15 | 18 | 18 | 18 | | | 229 |
| 2 | (Italy) Kawasaki Intermoto Ponyexpres | 22 | | | | | | | | | | 12 | 15 | 229 |
| 3 | (Italy) MV Agusta Reparto Corse | 16 | 1 | Ret | 3 | **15** | 2 | **2** | **1** | Ret | Ret | **1** | **3** | 178 |
| 3 | (Italy) MV Agusta Reparto Corse | 155 | | | | | | | 14 | 10 | Ret | 15 | 10 | 178 |
| 3 | (Italy) MV Agusta Reparto Corse | 65 | Ret | 8 | 12 | Ret | 15 | 14 | | | | | | 178 |
| 4 | (Italy) Team Go Eleven | 44 | 11 | 12 | 6 | 5 | 10 | 4 | 10 | 9 | 7 | 3 | 6 | 124 |
| 4 | (Italy) Team Go Eleven | 11 | 10 | 9 | Ret | 13 | 19 | 11 | 15 | 17 | 15 | 14 | 14 | 124 |
| 5 | (Russia) DMC Panavto–Yamaha | 88 | 2 | **5** | 4 | Ret | 3 | Ret | 8 | 7 | 5 | 6 | 5 | 122 |
| 5 | (Russia) DMC Panavto–Yamaha | 17 | | | | | | | | | | | 4 | 122 |
| 5 | (Russia) DMC Panavto–Yamaha | 161 | 17 | 19 | 20 | Ret | 20 | Ret | Ret | 19 | 21 | Ret | 17 | 122 |
| 6 | (United Kingdom) CIA Landlord Insurance Honda | 4 | Ret | 11 | Ret | 11 | 7 | Ret | 12 | 2 | 4 | Ret | Ret | 110 |
| 6 | (United Kingdom) CIA Landlord Insurance Honda | 35 | | 6 | 8 | 12 | 9 | 7 | 20 | 4 | Ret | | | 110 |
| 6 | (United Kingdom) CIA Landlord Insurance Honda | 7 | 13 | 20 | 17 | 17 | DNS | Ret | 23 | 20 | 22 | 18 | 19 | 110 |
| 6 | (United Kingdom) CIA Landlord Insurance Honda | 36 | | | | | | | | | | 16 | | 110 |
| 6 | (United Kingdom) CIA Landlord Insurance Honda | 77 | | | | | | | | | | | 16 | 110 |
| 7 | (Italy) San Carlo Puccetti Racing | 5 | 5 | 7 | 7 | Ret | 8 | Ret | 5 | Ret | 10 | 7 | 9 | 105 |
| 7 | (Italy) San Carlo Puccetti Racing | 10 | | Ret | 18 | 10 | 14 | 13 | 11 | 12 | 9 | Ret | | 105 |
| 7 | (Italy) San Carlo Puccetti Racing | 54 | | | | | | | | | 13 | Ret | 8 | 105 |
| 7 | (Italy) San Carlo Puccetti Racing | 15 | | | | | | | | | | | Ret | 105 |
| 8 | (United Kingdom) Core PTR Honda | 14 | Ret | 10 | 13 | Ret | 12 | 6 | 9 | 11 | 8 | 9 | 2 | 86 |
| 8 | (United Kingdom) Core PTR Honda | 35 | 3 | | | | | | | | | | | 86 |
| 9 | Mahi Racing Team India | 54 | **Ret** | 1 | Ret | Ret | 4 | 3 | 4 | **3** | | | | 83 |
| 10 | (Italy) Team Lorini | 24 | 14 | 16 | 11 | 7 | 11 | 10 | Ret | 13 | 19 | | | 63 |
| 10 | (Italy) Team Lorini | 84 | 8 | Ret | 14 | 8 | 13 | 12 | | | | | | 63 |
| 10 | (Italy) Team Lorini | 87 | | | | | | | 21 | 16 | Ret | 11 | Ret | 63 |
| 10 | (Italy) Team Lorini | 35 | | | | | | | | | | | 13 | 63 |
| 10 | (Italy) Team Lorini | 28 | | | | | | | 22 | | | | | 63 |
| 10 | (Italy) Team Lorini | 25 | | | | | | | | | | Ret | | 63 |
| 11 | (Germany) RS Wahr by Kraus Racing | 19 | 6 | Ret | 10 | 9 | Ret | | 13 | | | Ret | | 26 |
| 12 | (Italy) VFT Racing | 61 | 9 | 15 | 15 | 6 | Ret | Ret | 17 | 15 | 17 | Ret | 18 | 20 |
| 13 | (Germany) HAGN–SKM Racing Team | 6 | | 13 | | | | | | | 11 | 10 | | 14 |
| 14 | (Australia) Smiths Triumph | 81 | 7 | | | | | | | | | | | 9 |
| 14 | (Australia) Smiths Triumph | 3 | Ret | | | | | | | | | | | 9 |
| 14 | (Malaysia) SIC Racing Team | 20 | | | | | | 9 | | | | | | 7 |
| 16 | (Czech Republic) Com Plus SMS Racing | 53 | | | | | | | 16 | 14 | 14 | 17 | Ret | 5 |
| 16 | (Czech Republic) Com Plus SMS Racing | 89 | 15 | 18 | 19 | 16 | 18 | 16 | | | | | | 5 |
| 17 | (Russia) Rivamoto | 65 | | | | | | | | | 12 | Ret | | 4 |
| 17 | (Russia) Rivamoto | 67 | Ret | | | | | | | | | | | 4 |
| 18 | (Australia) AARK Racing | 64 | | | | | | | | | 20 | 13 | | 3 |
| | (Australia) Oz Wildcard Racing | 52 | 16 | | | | | | | | | | | 0 |
| | (Netherlands) Langenscheid R. by Fast Bike | 55 | | | 16 | | | | | | | | | 0 |
| | (United Kingdom) Anvil Hire TAG Racing | 94 | | | | | 16 | | | | | | | 0 |
| | (Spain) Team Torrentó | 57 | | | | | | | | | 16 | | | 0 |
| | (Spain) ATK Racing | 25 | | | | Ret | | | 19 | Ret | | | | 0 |
| | (France) Yohann Moto Sport | 23 | | | | | | | | | | Ret | | 0 |
| Pos. | Teams | Bike No. | PHI (Australia) | ARA (Spain) | ASS (Netherlands) | IMO (Italy) | DON (United Kingdom) | SEP (Malaysia) | MIS (Italy) | POR (Portugal) | JER (Spain) | MAG (France) | LOS (Qatar) | Pts. |

=== Manufacturers' championship ===
| Pos | Manufacturer | PHI (Australia) | ARA (Spain) | ASS (Netherlands) | IMO (Italy) | DON (United Kingdom) | SEP (Malaysia) | MIS (Italy) | POR (Portugal) | JER (Spain) | MAG (France) | LOS (Qatar) | Pts |
|---|---|---|---|---|---|---|---|---|---|---|---|---|---|
| 1 | (Japan) Honda | 3 | 2 | 1 | 1 | 1 | 1 | 2 | 1 | 1 | 2 | 1 | 251 |
| 2 | (Japan) Kawasaki | 4 | 1 | 2 | 3 | 4 | 3 | 3 | 3 | 2 | 3 | 6 | 181 |
| 3 | (Italy) MV Agusta | 1 | 8 | 3 | 15 | 2 | 2 | 1 | 10 | Ret | 1 | 3 | 162 |
| 4 | (Japan) Yamaha | 2 | 5 | 4 | 6 | 3 | Ret | 8 | 7 | 5 | 6 | 4 | 121 |
| 5 | (United Kingdom) Triumph | 7 | | | | 16 | | | | | | | 9 |
| | (Japan) Suzuki | | | | | | | | | | Ret | | 0 |
| Pos | Manufacturer | PHI (Australia) | ARA (Spain) | ASS (Netherlands) | IMO (Italy) | DON (United Kingdom) | SEP (Malaysia) | MIS (Italy) | POR (Portugal) | JER (Spain) | MAG (France) | LOS (Qatar) | Pts |
