= Mahir Çağrı =

Turkish internet celebrity (born 1962)

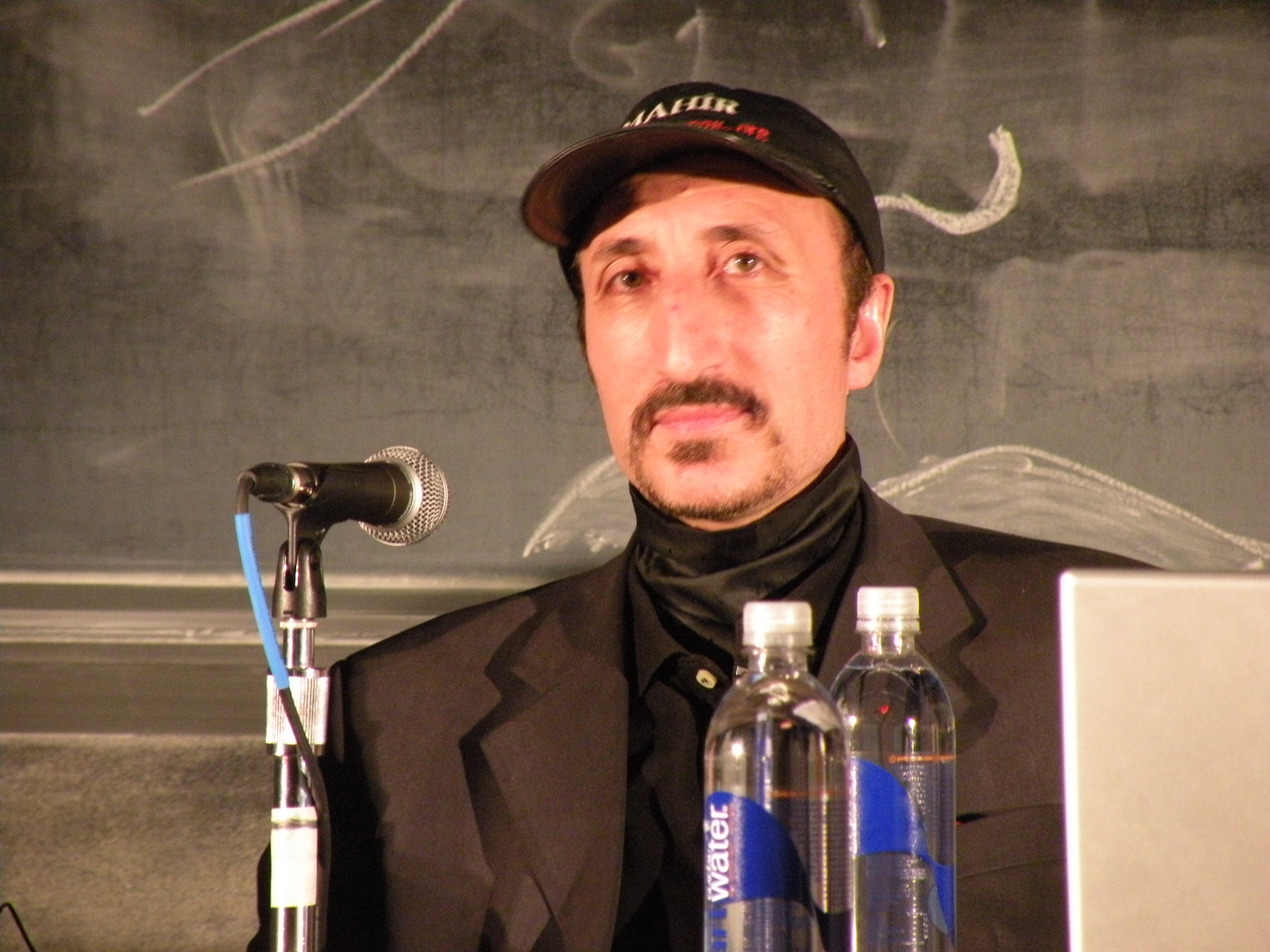
- Born: 1962 (age 63–64); Kars, Turkey
- Other names: Internet Mahir (Turkish: İnternet Mahir); I kiss you Mahir
- Years active: 1999—present
- Known for: Blogging (romance and personal life)
- Website: www.ikissyou.co, archive of his famous website

Mahir Çağrı (Turkish pronunciation: [maːhiɾ tʃaːɾɯ], born 1962) is a Turkish Internet celebrity. His picture-laden personal homepage from 1999, which exclaimed, in broken English, his love of the accordion, travel, and women, was visited by millions and spawned numerous fansites and parodies, one of which was featured on Fox's MadTV (season 5, episode 20). He was also repeatedly parodied in 1999 on episodes of the Late Show with David Letterman, wearing red Speedos and playing ping-pong. Çağrı was ranked #2 in CNET's Top 10 Web fads. The site was also included in PC World's "The 25 Worst Web Sites" list.

Çağrı claimed in various interviews that his personal webpage was hacked, with additions such as "I like sex" embedded into his webpage. The site was originally hosted on the now defunct XOOM web hosting service which advertised Çağrı on its front page during the mania.

Çağrı was used in British TV advertising for smartgroups.com by St. Luke's advertising agency.

== Similarities to Borat ==
Çağrı has stated that Sacha Baron Cohen's character Borat was based on him, and is therefore owed some sort of royalties for use of his likeness.

== See also ==
- Internet celebrity
- Internet meme
- List of Internet phenomena
