= Barış Tok =

Turkish professional motorcycle racer (born 1978)

- Nationality: (Turkey) Turkish
- Born: January 13, 1978 (age 48); Turkey
- Current team: GoPro BT Racing Team
- Bike number: 113

Barış Tok (born January 13, 1978) is a Turkish professional motorcycle racer. He competes in the 600 A category of Turkish Superstock Championship.

At the age of fifteen, Tok started to work for an advertising agency. His interest in BMX began during this time. His father sold his car and bought him an enduro motorcycle. He began then racing motocross in 1995 for Castrol Racing Team, and became Turkish champion in 1998 in the 250cc category. The same year, he placed third at the Balkan Motocross Championship held in Skopje, Macedonia.

Tok took part also in drag, and Superbike racings.

Gaining a wildcard, Tok raced at the 2013 Supersport World Championship's İstanbul Park round for GoPro BT Racing Team on Yamaha YZF-R6, and finished 2:07.077 behind the winner with a time 34:06.824 placing last of the 27 finishers.

== Racing record ==
=== Supersport World Championship ===
(key)

| Year | Bike | 1 | 2 | 3 | 4 | 5 | 6 | 7 | 8 | 9 | 10 | 11 | 12 | 13 | Pos | Pts |
|---|---|---|---|---|---|---|---|---|---|---|---|---|---|---|---|---|
| 2013 | Yamaha | AUS | SPA | NED | ITA | GBR | POR | ITA | RUS | GBR | GER | TUR; 27 | FRA | SPA | NC* | 0* |
