= 2013 Supersport World Championship =

2013 Supersport World Championship
Previous:	2012	Next:	2014
Support series: Superbike World Championship; FIM Superstock 1000 Cup; European Superstock 600 Championship; European Junior Cup

The 2013 Supersport World Championship was the fifteenth season of the Supersport World Championship—the seventeenth taking into account the two held under the name of Supersport World Series. It began on 24 February at Phillip Island and finished on 20 October at the Circuito de Jerez after 13 rounds.

The season was marred by the death of Italian rider Andrea Antonelli at the Moscow Raceway round.

== Race calendar and results ==
The provisional race schedule was publicly announced by the FIM on 6 October 2012 with thirteen confirmed rounds and one other round pending confirmation. The series will support the Superbike World Championship at every meeting except Mazda Raceway Laguna Seca. On 15 January 2013 the Indian round was moved from 10 March to 17 November. On 8 March 2013, the FIM issued a definitive calendar, confirming rounds at Portimão and Imola that were previously subject to contract, as well as introducing a round at Istanbul Park in September to complete a 14-round calendar. On 14 August 2013, the Indian round was cancelled due to "operational challenges" at the Buddh International Circuit.

Round	Country	Circuit	Date	Pole position	Fastest lap	Winning rider	Winning team
1	Australia	Phillip Island Grand Prix Circuit	24 February	(United Kingdom) Sam Lowes	(Turkey) Kenan Sofuoğlu	(Turkey) Kenan Sofuoğlu	Mahi Racing Team India
2	Spain	Motorland Aragón	14 April	(Turkey) Kenan Sofuoğlu	(United Kingdom) Sam Lowes	(France) Fabien Foret	Mahi Racing Team India
3	Netherlands	TT Circuit Assen	28 April	(United Kingdom) Sam Lowes	(France) Fabien Foret	(United Kingdom) Sam Lowes	Yakhnich Motorsport
4	Italy	Autodromo Nazionale Monza	12 May	(United Kingdom) Sam Lowes	(Italy) Lorenzo Zanetti	(United Kingdom) Sam Lowes	Yakhnich Motorsport
5	United Kingdom	Donington Park	26 May	(United Kingdom) Sam Lowes	(United Kingdom) Sam Lowes	(United Kingdom) Sam Lowes	Yakhnich Motorsport
6	Portugal	Autódromo Internacional do Algarve	9 June	(United Kingdom) Sam Lowes	(Turkey) Kenan Sofuoğlu	(United Kingdom) Sam Lowes	Yakhnich Motorsport
7	Italy	Autodromo Enzo e Dino Ferrari	30 June	(United Kingdom) Sam Lowes	(United Kingdom) Sam Lowes	(Turkey) Kenan Sofuoğlu	Mahi Racing Team India
8	Russia	Moscow Raceway	21 July	(Turkey) Kenan Sofuoğlu	Race cancelled (Note: The original attempt to run the race was interrupted on lap two, following an incident involving Lorenzo Zanetti and Andrea Antonelli. Antonelli suffered fatal injuries, and consequently, all further racing was abandoned.)		
9	United Kingdom	Silverstone Circuit	4 August	(United Kingdom) Sam Lowes	(United Kingdom) Sam Lowes	(Turkey) Kenan Sofuoğlu	Mahi Racing Team India
10	Germany	Nürburgring	1 September	(United Kingdom) Sam Lowes	(Turkey) Kenan Sofuoğlu	(United Kingdom) Sam Lowes	Yakhnich Motorsport
11	Turkey	Istanbul Park	15 September	(Turkey) Kenan Sofuoğlu	(United Kingdom) Sam Lowes	(Turkey) Kenan Sofuoğlu	Mahi Racing Team India
12	France	Circuit de Nevers Magny-Cours	6 October	(Turkey) Kenan Sofuoğlu	(United Kingdom) Sam Lowes	(Turkey) Kenan Sofuoğlu	Mahi Racing Team India
13	Spain	Circuito de Jerez	20 October	(United Kingdom) Sam Lowes	(United Kingdom) Sam Lowes	(United Kingdom) Sam Lowes	Yakhnich Motorsport

Footnotes

== Championship standings ==
=== Riders' championship ===
Pos.	Rider	Bike	PHI (Australia)	ARA (Spain)	ASS (Netherlands)	MNZ (Italy)	DON (United Kingdom)	POR (Portugal)	IMO (Italy)	MOS (Russia)	SIL (United Kingdom)	NÜR (Germany)	IST (Turkey)	MAG (France)	JER (Spain)	Pts
1	(United Kingdom) Sam Lowes	Yamaha	**2**	Ret	**1**	**1**	**1**	**1**	**2**	C	**2**	**1**	2	2	**1**	250
2	(Turkey) Kenan Sofuoğlu	Kawasaki	1	**Ret**	2	Ret	2	3	1	**C**	1	Ret	**1**	**1**	2	201
3	(France) Fabien Foret	Kawasaki	4	1	3	DNS	9	2	12	C	3	2	Ret	4	10	140
4	(Netherlands) Michael van der Mark	Honda	3	2	4	DNS	20	4	5	C	9	5	3	6	4	130
5	(Italy) Lorenzo Zanetti	Honda	8	6	10	3	4	14	4	C	11	4	4	7	5	119
6	(Italy) Roberto Rolfo	MV Agusta	Ret	9	6	11	3	Ret	14	C	6	15	5	Ret	3	78
7	(Republic of Ireland) Jack Kennedy	Honda	10	7	7	Ret	6	6	13	C	7	8	9	11	16	76
8	(Italy) Luca Scassa	Kawasaki	6	3	Ret	8	5	8	6	C	13	13	11	15		75
9	(United Kingdom) Kev Coghlan	Kawasaki	18	13	8	5	Ret	Ret	Ret	C	4	3	7	14	7	71
10	(Russia) Vladimir Leonov	Yamaha	Ret	8	12	7	16	11	3	C	10	Ret	15	9	9	63
11	(Italy) Andrea Antonelli	Kawasaki	7	4	9	Ret	8	7	7	C						55
12	(South Africa) Sheridan Morais	Honda	24	Ret	DNS	6	7	5	10		19					55
12	(South Africa) Sheridan Morais	Kawasaki										18	Ret	5	8	55
13	(France) Florian Marino	Kawasaki		Ret	5	2	21		8	C	8	10	19	WD		53
14	(Italy) Riccardo Russo	Kawasaki		5	14	4	14	Ret	Ret		Ret	6		Ret	6	48
15	(United Kingdom) Christian Iddon	MV Agusta	21	Ret	11	13	Ret	10	DNS	C	5	12	Ret	3	Ret	45
16	(Italy) Roberto Tamburini	Suzuki	13	15	26	18										39
16	(Italy) Roberto Tamburini	Honda								C	12	7	6	8	12	39
17	(Italy) Alex Baldolini	Honda	15	11	Ret	17										34
17	(Italy) Alex Baldolini	Suzuki					15	13	9	C	14	11	12	10	Ret	34
18	(Spain) David Salom	Kawasaki	5					NC			15	9	8		13	30
19	(Italy) Raffaele De Rosa	Honda	Ret	Ret	17	15	13	9	11	C	Ret	14	13	12	21	25
20	(Italy) Massimo Roccoli	Yamaha	9	12	13	DNS	Ret	12	18	C	Ret	16	14	13	17	23
21	(Russia) Vladimir Ivanov	Kawasaki	11	Ret	15	9	11	18	DNS							18
22	(Italy) Luca Marconi	Honda	12	10	DNS	10	18	15	DNS		20	22	20	18	19	17
23	(South Africa) Mathew Scholtz	Suzuki	14	21	18	12	17	Ret	Ret	C	16	20	17	Ret	14	8
24	(South Africa) Ronan Quarmby	Honda									18	Ret	10	16	Ret	6
25	(Australia) Glen Richards	Triumph					10				17					6
26	(United Kingdom) Danny Webb	Honda										23	18	17	11	5
27	(Hungary) Gábor Talmácsi	Honda	DNS	Ret	16	19	12	Ret								4
28	(Italy) Fabio Menghi	Yamaha	Ret	14	DNS			24	15	C	24	24	16	DNS	WD	3
29	(Austria) David Linortner	Honda	Ret	Ret	22	14	Ret	16	Ret	C	23					2
30	(Italy) Marco Faccani	Honda							DNS						15	1
	(Hungary) Balázs Németh	Honda	DNS	16	Ret	22	22	Ret	16	C	Ret	Ret	Ret	20		0
	(Australia) Matt Davies	Honda	20	18	Ret	16	Ret	17	DNS	C	25	26				0
	(Australia) Mitchell Carr	Triumph	16	Ret	23	25	24	22	19							0
	(Australia) Mitchell Carr	Honda									30	29				0
	(Denmark) Alex Schacht	Honda	Ret	17	19	Ret	23	21	20		Ret	Ret	22	19	23	0
	(Hungary) Imre Tóth	Honda	22	Ret		23	26	23	17	C	21	25	23	21	24	0
	(Australia) Joshua Hook	Honda	17													0
	(Australia) Jed Metcher	Suzuki										17				0
	(France) Matthieu Lagrive	Kawasaki												Ret	18	0
	(Spain) Nacho Calero	Honda	19	Ret	21	20	NC	19	21	C	27	28	21	Ret	22	0
	(Austria) Yves Polzer	Honda		19	25	24	Ret	25	22		28	DNS				0
	(Australia) Billy McConnell	Triumph					19				22					0
	(Austria) Stefan Kerschbaumer	Yamaha										19				0
	(Russia) Eduard Blokhin	Honda	23	20	DNQ	26	Ret	26	23	C	31	31	Ret	24	Ret	0
	(United Kingdom) Lee Johnston	Honda												Ret	20	0
	(Netherlands) Kevin van Leuven	Yamaha			20											0
	(Portugal) Miguel Praia	Honda						20								0
	(Italy) Dino Lombardi	Yamaha	Ret		24	21										0
	(Switzerland) Roman Stamm	Kawasaki										21				0
	(United States) Corey Alexander	Honda												22	25	0
	(Russia) Alexey Ivanov	Kawasaki								C	29	30	25	23	Ret	0
	(South Africa) David McFadden	Honda											24			0
	(Italy) Riccardo Cecchini	Honda					25									0
	(Australia) Brodie Waters	Honda												Ret	26	0
	(Italy) Ivan Clementi	Kawasaki									26					0
	(Greece) Theodosios Sinioris	Honda											26			0
	(Netherlands) Tony Coveña	Kawasaki					27									0
	(Netherlands) Pepijn Bijsterbosch	Yamaha										27				0
	(Turkey) Barış Tok	Yamaha											27			0
	(Italy) Luca Salvadori	Yamaha	Ret	Ret												0
	(Italy) Stefano Cruciani	Kawasaki		DNS		Ret										0
	(Australia) Kevin Curtain	Yamaha	Ret													0
	(United Kingdom) Sam Hornsey	Suzuki					Ret									0
	(Italy) Fabrizio Lai	Honda							Ret							0
	(Italy) Christopher Moretti	Yamaha							Ret							0
	(Germany) Kevin Wahr	Honda										Ret				0
	(Netherlands) Leon Bovee	Yamaha										Ret				0
	(Australia) Damian Cudlin	Honda											Ret			0
	(Turkey) Çağrı Coşkun	Honda											Ret			0
	(United Kingdom) Fraser Rogers	Honda													Ret	0
	(France) Valentin Debise	Honda							DNS	C						0
	(Russia) Sergei Krapukhin	Yamaha								C						0
	(United Kingdom) Luke Mossey	Honda								C						0
	(United States) Kenny Noyes	Honda								C						0
	(Italy) Alessia Polita	Yamaha				DNS										0
	(United Kingdom) Tommy Bridewell	Honda							DNS							0
	(Turkey) Mert Aytuğ	Yamaha											DNQ			0
Pos.	Rider	Bike	PHI (Australia)	ARA (Spain)	ASS (Netherlands)	MNZ (Italy)	DON (United Kingdom)	POR (Portugal)	IMO (Italy)	MOS (Russia)	SIL (United Kingdom)	NÜR (Germany)	IST (Turkey)	MAG (France)	JER (Spain)	Pts

Colour	Result
Gold	Winner
Silver	Second place
Bronze	Third place
Green	Points classification
Blue	Non-points classification
Blue	Non-classified finish (NC)
Purple	Retired, not classified (Ret)
Red	Did not qualify (DNQ)
Red	Did not pre-qualify (DNPQ)
Black	Disqualified (DSQ)
White	Did not start (DNS)
White	Withdrew (WD)
White	Race cancelled (C)
Blank	Did not practice (DNP)
Blank	Did not arrive (DNA)
Blank	Excluded (EX)

**Bold** – Pole position
Italics – Fastest lap

=== Teams' championship ===
Pos.	Teams	Bike No.	PHI (Australia)	ARA (Spain)	ASS (Netherlands)	MNZ (Italy)	DON (United Kingdom)	POR (Portugal)	IMO (Italy)	MOS (Russia)	SIL (United Kingdom)	NÜR (Germany)	IST (Turkey)	MAG (France)	JER (Spain)	Pts.
1	Mahi Racing Team India	54	1	**Ret**	2	Ret	2	3	1	**C**	1	Ret	**1**	**1**	2	341
1	Mahi Racing Team India	99	4	1	3	DNS	9	2	12	C	3	2	Ret	4	10	341
2	(Russia) Yakhnich Motorsport	11	**2**	Ret	**1**	**1**	**1**	**1**	**2**	C	**2**	**1**	2	2	**1**	313
2	(Russia) Yakhnich Motorsport	65	Ret	8	12	7	16	11	3	C	10	Ret	15	9	9	313
3	(Netherlands) Pata Honda World Supersport	60	3	2	4	DNS	20	4	5	C	9	5	3	6	4	249
3	(Netherlands) Pata Honda World Supersport	26	8	6	10	3	4	14	4	C	11	4	4	7	5	249
4	(Italy) Kawasaki Intermoto Ponyexpres	9	6	3	Ret	8	5	8	6	C	13	13	11	15		144
4	(Italy) Kawasaki Intermoto Ponyexpres	19		Ret	5	2	21		8	C						144
4	(Italy) Kawasaki Intermoto Ponyexpres	44	5					NC			15	9	8		13	144
4	(Italy) Kawasaki Intermoto Ponyexpres	49												Ret	18	144
5	(Italy) ParkinGO MV Agusta Corse	47	Ret	9	6	11	3	Ret	14	C	6	15	5	Ret	3	123
5	(Italy) ParkinGO MV Agusta Corse	21	21	Ret	11	13	Ret	10	DNS	C	5	12	Ret	3	Ret	123
6	(Russia) Kawasaki DMC–Lorenzini Team	88	18	13	8	5	Ret	Ret	Ret	C	4	3	7	14	7	89
6	(Russia) Kawasaki DMC–Lorenzini Team	6	11	Ret	15	9	11	18	DNS							89
6	(Russia) Kawasaki DMC–Lorenzini Team	161								C	29	30	25	23	Ret	89
7	(Russia) Rivamoto	4	10	7	7	Ret	6	6	13	C	7	8	9	11	16	76
7	(Russia) Rivamoto	24	23	20	DNQ	26	Ret	26	23	C	31	31	Ret	24	Ret	76
8	(Italy) Team Go Eleven	8	7	4	9	Ret	8	7	7	C						74
8	(Italy) Team Go Eleven	32										18	Ret	5	8	74
8	(Italy) Team Go Eleven	181									26					74
9	(Italy) Team Lorini	91								C	12	7	6	8	12	66
9	(Italy) Team Lorini	5	Ret	Ret	17	15	13	9	11	C	Ret	14	13	12	21	66
9	(Italy) Team Lorini	25	15	11	Ret	17										66
9	(Italy) Team Lorini	27					25									66
9	(Italy) Team Lorini	117						20								66
9	(Italy) Team Lorini	46							DNS							66
10	(United Kingdom) PTR Honda	32	24	Ret	DNS	6	7	5	10		19					58
10	(United Kingdom) PTR Honda	87	12	10	DNS	10	18	15	DNS		20	22	20	18	19	58
10	(United Kingdom) PTR Honda	66										23	18	17	11	58
10	(United Kingdom) PTR Honda	36								C						58
10	(United Kingdom) PTR Honda	41								C						58
11	(Italy) Puccetti Racing Kawasaki	84		5	14	4	14	Ret	Ret		Ret	6		Ret	6	48
12	(Italy) Suriano Racing Team	25					15	13	9	C	14	11	12	10	Ret	40
12	(Italy) Suriano Racing Team	20	14	21	18	12	17	Ret	Ret	C	16	20	17	Ret	14	40
12	(Italy) Suriano Racing Team	91	13	15	26	18										40
13	(Italy) Team Pata by Martini	55	9	12	13	DNS	Ret	12	18	C	Ret	16	14	13	17	23
13	(Italy) Team Pata by Martini	17	Ret	Ret												23
14	(Czech Republic) Prorace	17									18	Ret	10	16	Ret	10
14	(Czech Republic) Prorace	14	DNS	Ret	16	19	12	Ret								10
14	(Czech Republic) Prorace	53							DNS	C						10
15	(Italy) VFT Racing	61	Ret	14	DNS			24	15	C	24	24	16	DNS	WD	3
15	(Italy) VFT Racing	51				DNS										3
16	(United Kingdom) Team Honda PTR	37	Ret	Ret	22	14	Ret	16	Ret	C	23					2
16	(United Kingdom) Team Honda PTR	52											Ret			2
16	(United Kingdom) Team Honda PTR	79										Ret				2
16	(United Kingdom) Team Honda PTR	38												Ret	20	2
16	(United Kingdom) Team Honda PTR	64	20	18	Ret	16	Ret	17	DNS	C	25	26				2
16	(United Kingdom) Team Honda PTR	69											24			2
16	(United Kingdom) Team Honda PTR	15												22	25	2
	(Czech Republic) Complus SMS Racing	34	DNS	16	Ret	22	22	Ret	16	C	Ret	Ret	Ret	20		0
	(Czech Republic) Complus SMS Racing	98													Ret	0
	(Australia) AARK Racing	35	16	Ret	23	25	24	22	19		30	29				0
	(Australia) AARK Racing	40												Ret	26	0
	(Hungary) Racing Team Tóth	59	Ret	17	19	Ret	23	21	20		Ret	Ret	22	19	23	0
	(Hungary) Racing Team Tóth	10	22	Ret		23	26	23	17	C	21	25	23	21	24	0
	(United Kingdom) Honda PTR	7	19	Ret	21	20	NC	19	21	C	27	28	21	Ret	22	0
	(Italy) Pata by Martini Team	73	Ret		24	21										0
Pos.	Teams	Bike No.	PHI (Australia)	ARA (Spain)	ASS (Netherlands)	MNZ (Italy)	DON (United Kingdom)	POR (Portugal)	IMO (Italy)	MOS (Russia)	SIL (United Kingdom)	NÜR (Germany)	IST (Turkey)	MAG (France)	JER (Spain)	Pts.

=== Manufacturers' championship ===
Pos.	Manufacturer	PHI (Australia)	ARA (Spain)	ASS (Netherlands)	MNZ (Italy)	DON (United Kingdom)	POR (Portugal)	IMO (Italy)	MOS (Russia)	SIL (United Kingdom)	NÜR (Germany)	IST (Turkey)	MAG (France)	JER (Spain)	Pts
1	(Japan) Kawasaki	1	1	2	2	2	2	1	C	1	2	1	1	2	270
2	(Japan) Yamaha	2	8	1	1	1	1	2	C	2	1	2	2	1	258
3	(Japan) Honda	3	2	4	3	4	4	4	C	7	4	3	6	4	165
4	(Italy) MV Agusta	21	9	6	11	3	10	14	C	5	12	5	3	3	104
5	(Japan) Suzuki	13	15	18	12	15	13	9	C	14	11	12	10	14	38
6	(United Kingdom) Triumph	16	Ret	23	25	10	22	19		17					6
Pos.	Manufacturer	PHI (Australia)	ARA (Spain)	ASS (Netherlands)	MNZ (Italy)	DON (United Kingdom)	POR (Portugal)	IMO (Italy)	MOS (Russia)	SIL (United Kingdom)	NÜR (Germany)	IST (Turkey)	MAG (France)	JER (Spain)	Pts

== Entry list ==
2013 entry list
Team	Constructor	Motorcycle	No.	Rider	Rounds
Smiths Triumph	Triumph	Triumph Daytona 675	2	(Australia) Billy McConnell	5, 9
Smiths Triumph	Triumph	Triumph Daytona 675	75	(Australia) Glen Richards	5, 9
Puccetti Racing Kawasaki	Kawasaki	Kawasaki ZX-6R	3	(Italy) Stefano Cruciani	2, 4
Puccetti Racing Kawasaki	Kawasaki	Kawasaki ZX-6R	84	(Italy) Riccardo Russo	2–7, 9–10, 12–13
Rivamoto	Honda	Honda CBR600RR	4	(Republic of Ireland) Jack Kennedy	All
Rivamoto	Honda	Honda CBR600RR	24	(Russia) Eduard Blokhin	All
Team Lorini	Honda	Honda CBR600RR	5	(Italy) Raffaele De Rosa	All
Team Lorini	Honda	Honda CBR600RR	25	(Italy) Alex Baldolini	1–4
Team Lorini	Honda	Honda CBR600RR	27	(Italy) Riccardo Cecchini	5
Team Lorini	Honda	Honda CBR600RR	46	(United Kingdom) Tommy Bridewell	7
Team Lorini	Honda	Honda CBR600RR	91	(Italy) Roberto Tamburini	8–13
Team Lorini	Honda	Honda CBR600RR	117	(Portugal) Miguel Praia	6
Kawasaki DMC–Lorenzini Team	Kawasaki	Kawasaki ZX-6R	6	(Russia) Vladimir Ivanov	1–7
Kawasaki DMC–Lorenzini Team	Kawasaki	Kawasaki ZX-6R	88	(United Kingdom) Kev Coghlan	All
Kawasaki DMC–Lorenzini Team	Kawasaki	Kawasaki ZX-6R	161	(Russia) Alexey Ivanov	8–13
Honda PTR	Honda	Honda CBR600RR	7	(Spain) Nacho Calero	All
Team Goeleven	Kawasaki	Kawasaki ZX-6R	8	(Italy) Andrea Antonelli	1–8
Team Goeleven	Kawasaki	Kawasaki ZX-6R	32	(South Africa) Sheridan Morais	10–13
Team Goeleven	Kawasaki	Kawasaki ZX-6R	181	(Italy) Ivan Clementi	9
Kawasaki Intermoto Ponyexpres	Kawasaki	Kawasaki ZX-6R	9	(Italy) Luca Scassa	1–12
Kawasaki Intermoto Ponyexpres	Kawasaki	Kawasaki ZX-6R	19	(France) Florian Marino	2–5, 7–8
Kawasaki Intermoto Ponyexpres	Kawasaki	Kawasaki ZX-6R	19	(France) Florian Marino	9–11
Kawasaki Intermoto Ponyexpres	Kawasaki	Kawasaki ZX-6R	44	(Spain) David Salom	1, 6, 9–11, 13
Kawasaki Intermoto Ponyexpres	Kawasaki	Kawasaki ZX-6R	49	(France) Matthieu Lagrive	12–13
Racing Team Tóth	Honda	Honda CBR600RR	10	(Hungary) Imre Tóth	1–2, 4–13
Racing Team Tóth	Honda	Honda CBR600RR	59	(Denmark) Alex Schacht	1–7, 9–13
Yakhnich Motorsport	Yamaha	Yamaha YZF-R6	11	(United Kingdom) Sam Lowes	All
Yakhnich Motorsport	Yamaha	Yamaha YZF-R6	65	(Russia) Vladimir Leonov	All
Yamaha Racing Team	Yamaha	Yamaha YZF-R6	12	(Australia) Kevin Curtain	1
Team Suzuki Mayer	Suzuki	Suzuki GSX-R600	13	(Australia) Jed Metcher	10
Prorace	Honda	Honda CBR600RR	14	(Hungary) Gábor Talmácsi	1–6
Prorace	Honda	Honda CBR600RR	17	(South Africa) Ronan Quarmby	9–13
Prorace	Honda	Honda CBR600RR	53	(France) Valentin Debise	7–8
Team Honda PTR	Honda	Honda CBR600RR	15	(United States) Corey Alexander	12–13
Team Honda PTR	Honda	Honda CBR600RR	37	(Austria) David Linortner	1–9
Team Honda PTR	Honda	Honda CBR600RR	38	(United Kingdom) Lee Johnston	12–13
Team Honda PTR	Honda	Honda CBR600RR	52	(Australia) Damian Cudlin	11
Team Honda PTR	Honda	Honda CBR600RR	64	(Australia) Matt Davies	1–10
Team Honda PTR	Honda	Honda CBR600RR	69	(South Africa) David McFadden	11
Team Honda PTR	Honda	Honda CBR600RR	79	(Germany) Kevin Wahr	10
Team Honda Racing	Honda	Honda CBR600RR	16	(Australia) Joshua Hook	1
Team Pata by Martini	Yamaha	Yamaha YZF-R6	17	(Italy) Luca Salvadori	1–2
Team Pata by Martini	Yamaha	Yamaha YZF-R6	55	(Italy) Massimo Roccoli	All
Suriano Racing Team	Suzuki	Suzuki GSX-R600	20	(South Africa) Mathew Scholtz	All
Suriano Racing Team	Suzuki	Suzuki GSX-R600	25	(Italy) Alex Baldolini	5–13
Suriano Racing Team	Suzuki	Suzuki GSX-R600	91	(Italy) Roberto Tamburini	1–4
ParkinGO MV Agusta Corse	MV Agusta	MV Agusta F3 675	21	(United Kingdom) Christian Iddon	All
ParkinGO MV Agusta Corse	MV Agusta	MV Agusta F3 675	47	(Italy) Roberto Rolfo	All
Speedy Bike	Honda	Honda CBR600RR	22	(Italy) Fabrizio Lai	7
Pata Honda World Supersport	Honda	Honda CBR600RR	26	(Italy) Lorenzo Zanetti	All
Pata Honda World Supersport	Honda	Honda CBR600RR	60	(Netherlands) Michael van der Mark	All
DTC KME Racing	Yamaha	Yamaha YZF-R6	31	(Netherlands) Leon Bovee	10
PTR Honda	Honda	Honda CBR600RR	32	(South Africa) Sheridan Morais	1–7, 9
PTR Honda	Honda	Honda CBR600RR	36	(United States) Kenny Noyes	8
PTR Honda	Honda	Honda CBR600RR	41	(United Kingdom) Luke Mossey	8
PTR Honda	Honda	Honda CBR600RR	66	(United Kingdom) Danny Webb	10–13
PTR Honda	Honda	Honda CBR600RR	87	(Italy) Luca Marconi	1–7, 9–13
Team MRC Austria	Honda	Honda CBR600RR	33	(Austria) Yves Polzer	2–7, 9–10
Complus SMS Racing	Honda	Honda CBR600RR	34	(Hungary) Balázs Németh	1–12
Complus SMS Racing	Honda	Honda CBR600RR	98	(United Kingdom) Fraser Rogers	13
AARK Racing	Triumph	Triumph 675 R	35	(Australia) Mitchell Carr	1–7
AARK Racing	Honda	Honda CBR600RR	35	(Australia) Mitchell Carr	9–10
AARK Racing	Honda	Honda CBR600RR	40	(Australia) Brodie Waters	12–13
United Gebben Racing	Yamaha	Yamaha YZF-R6	43	(Netherlands) Kevin van Leuven	3
Evan Bros Racing by S.M.A. Honda Italia Jr	Honda	Honda CBR600RR	45	(Italy) Marco Faccani	7, 13
RWT–ALPHA Sport	Yamaha	Yamaha YZF-R6	50	(Russia) Sergei Krapukhin	8
VFT Racing	Yamaha	Yamaha YZF-R6	51	(Italy) Alessia Polita	4
VFT Racing	Yamaha	Yamaha YZF-R6	61	(Italy) Fabio Menghi	1–3, 6–12
Mahi Racing Team India	Kawasaki	Kawasaki ZX-6R	54	(Turkey) Kenan Sofuoğlu	All
Mahi Racing Team India	Kawasaki	Kawasaki ZX-6R	99	(France) Fabien Foret	All
Racing Team Bijsterbosch	Yamaha	Yamaha YZF-R6	56	(Netherlands) Pepijn Bijsterbosch	10
GoPro BT Racing Team	Yamaha	Yamaha YZF-R6	62	(Turkey) Mert Aytuğ	11
GoPro BT Racing Team	Yamaha	Yamaha YZF-R6	113	(Turkey) Barış Tok	11
Pata by Martini Team	Yamaha	Yamaha YZF-R6	73	(Italy) Dino Lombardi	1, 3–4
Kawasaki Schnock–Shell Advance	Kawasaki	Kawasaki ZX-6R	76	(Switzerland) Roman Stamm	10
Bike Service	Yamaha	Yamaha YZF-R6	81	(Italy) Christopher Moretti	7
Langenscheidt by Fast Bike Service	Yamaha	Yamaha YZF-R6	89	(Austria) Stefan Kerschbaumer	10
Pacific Racing Team	Honda	Honda CBR600RR	90	(Turkey) Çağrı Coşkun	11
RLR Motorsports	Suzuki	Suzuki GSX-R600	94	(United Kingdom) Sam Hornsey	5
Sinioris Racing Team	Honda	Honda CBR600RR	95	(Greece) Theodosios Sinioris	11
Nito Racing	Kawasaki	Kawasaki ZX-6R	96	(Netherlands) Tony Coveña	5

Key
Regular rider
Wildcard rider
Replacement rider

- All entries used Pirelli tyres.
