= Mert Aytuğ =

Turkish auto racing driver and motorcycle racer (born 1984)

- Nationality: (Turkey) Turkish
- Born: December 19, 1984 (age 41); Turkey
- Current team: GoPro BT Racing Team
- Bike number: 62

Mert Aytuğ (born December 19, 1984) is a Turkish professional auto racing driver and motorcycle racer. He competed in one-make series, Formula Three class and motorcycle races in the 600cc C category.

== Career ==
Karting

In 1998, Aytuğ's father bought him a four-year-old second-hand go-kart. The next year, he began kart racing, however with no success in the beginning. Soon, he received a new one, with which he completed his first season in the championship at fourth rank. In the 2001 and 2002 season, he became champion.

Car racing

Aytuğ was admitted in 2002 to Tofaş Racing Team to race at the Fiat Palio Cup. Two years later in 2004, he transferred to Seat Team, and competed in the same time also in the Turkish Formula Three Championship. That year, Aytuğ won the first edition of SEAT León Turkey Cup. In the 2004 Formula Three Championship, he became the runner-up. In 2007, he competed also in two rounds of the SEAT León Supercopa Spain without points.

Motorcycle racing

Aytuğ entered motorcycle racing taking part in the Turkish championship's 600cc C category.

Aytuğ gained a wildcard to race at the 2013 Supersport World Championship's İstanbul Park round for Pacific Racing Team on Honda CBR600RR. However, due to his qualifying time, he could not start at the race.

== Racing record ==
=== Supersport World Championship ===
(key)

Year	Bike	1	2	3	4	5	6	7	8	9	10	11	12	13	Pos	Pts
2013	Yamaha	AUS	SPA	NED	ITA	GBR	POR	ITA	RUS	GBR	GER	TUR; DNQ	FRA	SPA	NC*	0*

- * Season still in progress.
