= 2015 FIM Superstock 1000 Cup =

2015 FIM Superstock 1000 Cup
Previous:	2014	Next:	2016
Support series: Superbike World Championship; Supersport World Championship; European Superstock 600 Championship; European Junior Cup

The 2015 FIM Superstock 1000 Cup was the seventeenth season of the FIM Superstock 1000 Cup, the eleventh held under this name. The championship, a support class to the Superbike World Championship at its European rounds, used 1000 cc motorcycles and was reserved for riders between 16 and 28 years of age. The 2015 season was contested over eight races at eight meetings, beginning at Motorland Aragón on 12 April and ending at Circuit de Nevers Magny-Cours on 4 October.

With an eighth-place finish in the final race of the year at Magny-Cours, Italy's Lorenzo Savadori – riding for the Nuova M2 Racing team – became the series champion, winning the first title in the class for Aprilia. Savadori won four of the eight races to be held in 2015, including three successive wins at Assen, Imola and Donington Park, and ultimately won the championship by twenty-two points ahead of BMW rider Roberto Tamburini, riding for Team MotoxRacing. Tamburini was a three-time race winner, winning at Motorland Aragón, Portimão and Jerez. Raffaele De Rosa completed the championship top-three, who took six podium finishes for Althea Racing. Fourth place in the championship went to the only other race-winner during the 2015 season, Frenchman Jérémy Guarnoni, who achieved a victory on home soil – at Magny-Cours – for Team Trasimeno.

In the manufacturers' championship, Savadori's four wins for Aprilia also aided the marque to the title, winning it at the final round as well. Aprilia finished 34 points clear of BMW, with Ducati a further 5 points behind.

== Race calendar and results ==
Round	Country	Circuit	Date	Pole position	Fastest lap	Winning rider	Winning team
1	Spain	Motorland Aragón	12 April	(Italy) Lorenzo Savadori	(Italy) Roberto Tamburini	(Italy) Roberto Tamburini	Team MotoxRacing
2	Netherlands	TT Circuit Assen	19 April	(Italy) Lorenzo Savadori	(Italy) Lorenzo Savadori	(Italy) Lorenzo Savadori	Nuova M2 Racing
3	Italy	Autodromo Enzo e Dino Ferrari	10 May	(Czech Republic) Ondřej Ježek	(Italy) Roberto Tamburini	(Italy) Lorenzo Savadori	Nuova M2 Racing
4	United Kingdom	Donington Park	24 May	(Italy) Roberto Tamburini	(Italy) Lorenzo Savadori	(Italy) Lorenzo Savadori	Nuova M2 Racing
5	Portugal	Autódromo Internacional do Algarve	7 June	(Italy) Roberto Tamburini	(United Kingdom) Kev Coghlan	(Italy) Roberto Tamburini	Team MotoxRacing
6	Italy	Misano World Circuit Marco Simoncelli	21 June	(Italy) Lorenzo Savadori	(Italy) Raffaele De Rosa	(Italy) Lorenzo Savadori	Nuova M2 Racing
7	Spain	Circuito de Jerez	20 September	(Italy) Roberto Tamburini	(Italy) Kevin Calia	(Italy) Roberto Tamburini	Team MotoxRacing
8	France	Circuit de Nevers Magny-Cours	4 October	(France) Jérémy Guarnoni	(Italy) Riccardo Russo	(France) Jérémy Guarnoni	Team Trasimeno

== Championship standings ==
=== Riders' championship ===
Pos.	Rider	Bike	ARA (Spain)	ASS (Netherlands)	IMO (Italy)	DON (United Kingdom)	POR (Portugal)	MIS (Italy)	JER (Spain)	MAG (France)	Pts
1	(Italy) Lorenzo Savadori	Aprilia	**2**	**1**	1	1	2	**1**	3	8	164
2	(Italy) Roberto Tamburini	BMW	1	Ret	2	**2**	**1**	3	**1**	5	142
3	(Italy) Raffaele De Rosa	Ducati	4	2	Ret	3	3	2	2	3	121
4	(France) Jérémy Guarnoni	Yamaha	9	9	6	4	8	6	5	**1**	91
5	(Czech Republic) Ondřej Ježek	Ducati	5	3	**3**	6	4	8	8	Ret	82
6	(United Kingdom) Kev Coghlan	Yamaha	3	6	4	5	5	5			72
7	(Italy) Kevin Calia	Aprilia	Ret	5	15	7	7	4	Ret	2	63
8	(Italy) Fabio Massei	Ducati	Ret	4	5	8	13	10	7	6	60
9	(Australia) Bryan Staring	Kawasaki	6	8	Ret	12	6	9	9	9	53
10	(Sweden) Christoffer Bergman	Yamaha	10	12	12	11	12	7	17	13	35
11	(France) Florian Marino	Yamaha	7	7	Ret		11	DNS			23
12	(Netherlands) Tony Coveña	Ducati	13	13	7	10	30	19	21	25	21
13	(Germany) Marc Moser	Ducati	16	10	14	13	17	12	15	14	18
14	(Switzerland) Sébastien Suchet	Kawasaki	12	14	11	15	15	16	Ret	11	18
15	(France) Sylvain Barrier	Yamaha	11	Ret	10	19	10	Ret			17
16	(Italy) Luca Salvadori	Ducati	15	Ret	8	9	18	DNS			16
17	(Italy) Luca Marconi	Yamaha			16	14	9	11	14		16
18	(Austria) Lukas Trautmann	Yamaha							6	12	14
19	(France) Mathieu Gines	Yamaha				28				4	13
20	(Italy) Riccardo Russo	Yamaha							4	Ret	13
21	(Italy) Alessandro Andreozzi	Aprilia							13	7	12
22	(Italy) Federico D'Annunzio	BMW	Ret	Ret			20	17	10	10	12
23	(France) Romain Lanusse	Kawasaki	8	Ret	Ret	DNS					8
24	(Italy) Denni Schiavoni	BMW			9						7
25	(Spain) Antonio Alarcos	Kawasaki							11		5
26	(Netherlands) Wayne Tessels	Suzuki	18	11	22	17	21	Ret	18	18	5
27	(South Africa) Mathew Scholtz	Yamaha							12		4
28	(France) Matthieu Lussiana	Kawasaki	Ret	DNS	Ret	Ret	19	13	16	Ret	3
29	(Hungary) Péter Sebestyén	Kawasaki	Ret	20	13	Ret	23	18	25	20	3
30	(South Africa) David McFadden	Kawasaki					16				2
30	(South Africa) David McFadden	Suzuki						14	19	16	2
31	(Australia) Aiden Wagner	Suzuki					14				2
31	(Australia) Aiden Wagner	Kawasaki						Ret			2
32	(Italy) Michele Magnoni	Yamaha	14	DNS		Ret					2
33	(Switzerland) Eric Vionnet	BMW	Ret	DNS	DNS	26	28	Ret	20	15	1
34	(Romania) Robert Mureșan	BMW						15			1
35	(France) Randy Pagaud	Kawasaki	21	15	19	25	26	22	28	Ret	1
	(United Kingdom) Victor Cox	Suzuki				16					0
	(Netherlands) Danny de Boer	Yamaha		16							0
	(France) Stéphane Egea	Kawasaki	DNS					23		17	0
	(Italy) Fabio Marchionni	BMW	19	18	17						0
	(Italy) Riccardo Cecchini	Kawasaki	Ret	17	Ret	23	22	Ret	22	19	0
	(Italy) Federico Sanchioni	Kawasaki	17	Ret	23	24	Ret	21	24	22	0
	(Switzerland) Michaël Savary	Kawasaki				18	27				0
	(Netherlands) Kevin Valk	Kawasaki	Ret	Ret	18	21	25	Ret			0
	(Italy) Alberto Butti	Kawasaki	DNS	19	DNS		29	27	27	21	0
	(Italy) Francesco Cavalli	Kawasaki	22	21	Ret	20	24	20	26	23	0
	(Italy) Luca Oppedisano	BMW			20						0
	(South Africa) Ronald Slamet	Kawasaki	20					24			0
	(Italy) Remo Castellarin	Yamaha	Ret	Ret							0
	(Italy) Remo Castellarin	Suzuki			21						0
	(South Africa) Greg Gildenhuys	BMW				22					0
	(France) Mathieu Dumas	Kawasaki	Ret	22	24	27	Ret	25	Ret	24	0
	(Germany) Max Fritzsch	Kawasaki							23		0
	(Belgium) Marty Debruyne	Kawasaki								26	0
	(Italy) Marco Sbaiz	BMW						26			0
	(South Africa) Andre Calvet	Kawasaki							29		0
	(Switzerland) Bryan Leu	Yamaha								Ret	0
	(Switzerland) Thomas Toffel	BMW								Ret	0
	(Belgium) Gauthier Duwelz	BMW						DNS	Ret		0
	(United Kingdom) Gregg Black	Kawasaki			Ret						0
	(Netherlands) Nigel Walraven	Suzuki	Ret								0
	(Italy) Marco Marcheluzzo	BMW						DNS			0
	(Hungary) Balázs Németh	Kawasaki	DNS								0
Pos.	Rider	Bike	ARA (Spain)	ASS (Netherlands)	IMO (Italy)	DON (United Kingdom)	POR (Portugal)	MIS (Italy)	JER (Spain)	MAG (France)	Pts

Colour	Result
Gold	Winner
Silver	Second place
Bronze	Third place
Green	Points classification
Blue	Non-points classification
Blue	Non-classified finish (NC)
Purple	Retired, not classified (Ret)
Red	Did not qualify (DNQ)
Red	Did not pre-qualify (DNPQ)
Black	Disqualified (DSQ)
White	Did not start (DNS)
White	Withdrew (WD)
White	Race cancelled (C)
Blank	Did not practice (DNP)
Blank	Did not arrive (DNA)
Blank	Excluded (EX)

**Bold** – Pole position
Italics – Fastest lap

=== Manufacturers' championship ===
Pos.	Manufacturer	ARA (Spain)	ASS (Netherlands)	IMO (Italy)	DON (United Kingdom)	POR (Portugal)	MIS (Italy)	JER (Spain)	MAG (France)	Pts
1	(Italy) Aprilia	2	1	1	1	2	1	3	2	176
2	(Germany) BMW	1	18	2	2	1	3	1	5	142
3	(Italy) Ducati	4	2	3	3	3	2	2	3	137
4	(Japan) Yamaha	3	6	4	4	5	5	4	1	112
5	(Japan) Kawasaki	6	8	11	12	6	9	9	9	58
6	(Japan) Suzuki	18	11	21	16	14	14	18	16	9
Pos.	Manufacturer	ARA (Spain)	ASS (Netherlands)	IMO (Italy)	DON (United Kingdom)	POR (Portugal)	MIS (Italy)	JER (Spain)	MAG (France)	Pts

== Entry list ==
2015 entry list
Team	Constructor	Motorcycle	No.	Rider	Rounds
Team MotoxRacing	BMW	BMW S1000RR	2	(Italy) Roberto Tamburini	All
Team BSR	Kawasaki	Kawasaki ZX-10R	3	(Switzerland) Sébastien Suchet	All
MRS Yamaha	Yamaha	Yamaha YZF-R1	4	(France) Mathieu Gines	4, 8
MRS Yamaha	Yamaha	Yamaha YZF-R1	21	(France) Florian Marino	1–3, 5–6
MRS Yamaha	Yamaha	Yamaha YZF-R1	50	(Austria) Lukas Trautmann	7–8
MRS Yamaha	Yamaha	Yamaha YZF-R1	88	(United Kingdom) Kev Coghlan	1–6
MRS Yamaha	Yamaha	Yamaha YZF-R1	120	(South Africa) Mathew Scholtz	7
TR.Corse	BMW	BMW S1000RR	5	(Belgium) Gauthier Duwelz	6–8
TR.Corse	BMW	BMW S1000RR	55	(Italy) Fabio Marchionni	1–3
TR.Corse	BMW	BMW S1000RR	134	(South Africa) Greg Gildenhuys	4
2R Racing	BMW	BMW S1000RR	6	(Italy) Denni Schiavoni	3
MTM–HS Kawasaki	Kawasaki	Kawasaki ZX-10R	7	(Germany) Max Fritzsch	7
MTM–HS Kawasaki	Kawasaki	Kawasaki ZX-10R	8	(Netherlands) Kevin Valk	1–6
MTM–HS Kawasaki	Kawasaki	Kawasaki ZX-10R	54	(Belgium) Marty Debruyne	8
Clasitaly	Kawasaki	Kawasaki ZX-10R	9	(Italy) Francesco Cavalli	All
Clasitaly	Kawasaki	Kawasaki ZX-10R	13	(Italy) Federico Sanchioni	All
Team Suzuki Europe	Suzuki	Suzuki GSX-R1000	10	(Australia) Aiden Wagner	5
Team Suzuki Europe	Suzuki	Suzuki GSX-R1000	14	(United Kingdom) Victor Cox	4
Team Suzuki Europe	Suzuki	Suzuki GSX-R1000	16	(Italy) Remo Castellarin	3
Team Suzuki Europe	Suzuki	Suzuki GSX-R1000	19	(Netherlands) Nigel Walraven	1–2
Team Suzuki Europe	Suzuki	Suzuki GSX-R1000	77	(Netherlands) Wayne Tessels	All
Team Suzuki Europe	Suzuki	Suzuki GSX-R1000	169	(South Africa) David McFadden	6–8
Team Pedercini	Kawasaki	Kawasaki ZX-10R	10	(Australia) Aiden Wagner	6
Team Pedercini	Kawasaki	Kawasaki ZX-10R	27	(Italy) Riccardo Cecchini	All
Team Pedercini	Kawasaki	Kawasaki ZX-10R	56	(Hungary) Péter Sebestyén	All
Team Pedercini	Kawasaki	Kawasaki ZX-10R	67	(Australia) Bryan Staring	All
Team Pedercini	Kawasaki	Kawasaki ZX-10R	98	(France) Romain Lanusse	1–4
Team Pedercini	Kawasaki	Kawasaki ZX-10R	169	(South Africa) David McFadden	5
Team Trasimeno	Yamaha	Yamaha YZF-R1	11	(France) Jérémy Guarnoni	All
Team Trasimeno	Yamaha	Yamaha YZF-R1	16	(Italy) Remo Castellarin	1–2
Team Trasimeno	Yamaha	Yamaha YZF-R1	87	(Italy) Luca Marconi	3–7
BWG Racing Kawasaki	Kawasaki	Kawasaki ZX-10R	12	(South Africa) Andre Calvet	7
BWG Racing Kawasaki	Kawasaki	Kawasaki ZX-10R	68	(South Africa) Ronald Slamet	1, 6
Team OGP	Kawasaki	Kawasaki ZX-10R	15	(France) Mathieu Dumas	All
Team OGP	Kawasaki	Kawasaki ZX-10R	39	(France) Randy Pagaud	All
Team18 Delcamp Energie; Team18 Sapeurs Pompiers	Kawasaki	Kawasaki ZX-10R	18	(France) Stéphane Egea	1, 6, 8
Team18 Delcamp Energie; Team18 Sapeurs Pompiers	Kawasaki	Kawasaki ZX-10R	81	(Switzerland) Michaël Savary	4–5
Team18 Delcamp Energie; Team18 Sapeurs Pompiers	Kawasaki	Kawasaki ZX-10R	112	(Spain) Antonio Alarcos	7
Team18 Delcamp Energie; Team18 Sapeurs Pompiers	Kawasaki	Kawasaki ZX-10R	118	(United Kingdom) Gregg Black	3
G.M. Racing	Yamaha	Yamaha YZF-R1	20	(France) Sylvain Barrier	1–6
G.M. Racing	Yamaha	Yamaha YZF-R1	84	(Italy) Riccardo Russo	7–8
G.M. Racing	Yamaha	Yamaha YZF-R1	119	(Italy) Michele Magnoni	1–2, 4
Althea Racing	Ducati	Ducati 1199 Panigale R	23	(Italy) Luca Salvadori	1–6
Althea Racing	Ducati	Ducati 1199 Panigale R	35	(Italy) Raffaele De Rosa	All
Motos Vionnet	BMW	BMW S1000RR	24	(Switzerland) Thomas Toffel	8
Motos Vionnet	BMW	BMW S1000RR	51	(Switzerland) Éric Vionnet	All
Vueffe Corse	BMW	BMW S1000RR	26	(Italy) Marco Sbaiz	6
Triple-M by Barni	Ducati	Ducati 1199 Panigale R	28	(Germany) Marc Moser	All
Triple-M by Barni	Ducati	Ducati 1199 Panigale R	69	(Czech Republic) Ondřej Ježek	All
Nuova M2 Racing	Aprilia	Aprilia RSV4	32	(Italy) Lorenzo Savadori	All
Nuova M2 Racing	Aprilia	Aprilia RSV4	74	(Italy) Kevin Calia	All
Nuova M2 Racing	Aprilia	Aprilia RSV4	121	(Italy) Alessandro Andreozzi	7–8
R2 MotorSport Team	Kawasaki	Kawasaki ZX-10R	34	(Hungary) Balázs Németh	1
FDA Racing Team	BMW	BMW S1000RR	41	(Italy) Federico D'Annunzio	1–2, 5–8
EAB Racing Team	Ducati	Ducati 1199 Panigale R	43	(Italy) Fabio Massei	All
EAB Racing Team	Ducati	Ducati 1199 Panigale R	99	(Netherlands) Tony Coveña	All
SWPN	Yamaha	Yamaha YZF-R1	44	(Netherlands) Danny de Boer	2
MG Competition	Yamaha	Yamaha YZF-R1	71	(Sweden) Christoffer Bergman	All
DMR Racing Team	BMW	BMW S1000RR	91	(Italy) Luca Oppedisano	3
DMR Racing Team	BMW	BMW S1000RR	111	(Italy) Marco Marcheluzzo	6
Badan Yamaha IXS Racing Team	Yamaha	Yamaha YZF-R1	92	(Switzerland) Bryan Leu	8
Team Go Eleven; BV Racing by Go Eleven	Kawasaki	Kawasaki ZX-10R	93	(Italy) Alberto Butti	1–3, 5–8
Team ASPI	Kawasaki	Kawasaki ZX-10R	94	(France) Matthieu Lussiana	All
H-Moto Team	BMW	BMW S1000RR	95	(Romania) Robert Mureșan	6

Key
Regular rider
Wildcard rider
Replacement rider

- All entries used Pirelli tyres.
