= Pepijn Bijsterbosch =

Dutch motorcycle racer (born 1989)

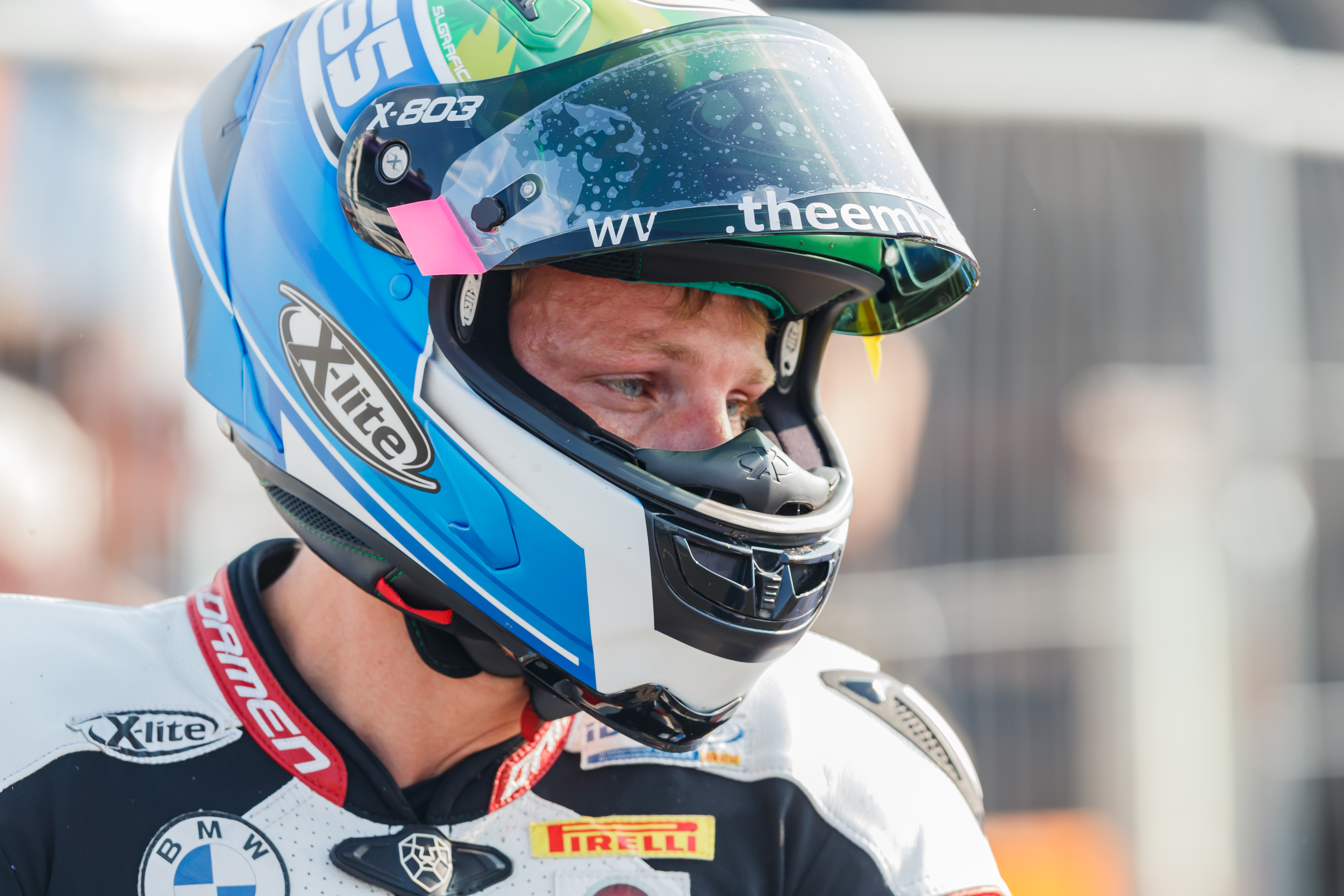
- Nationality: Dutch
- Born: 3 November 1989 (age 37); Wapenveld, Netherlands
- Current team: Team Dutch Comfort Houses
- Bike number: 55
- Website: pepijnbijsterbosch.nl
Motorcycle racing career statistics
125cc World Championship
Active years	2009–2010
Manufacturers	Honda
Starts / Wins / Podiums / Poles / F. laps / Points; 2 / 0 / 0 / 0 / 0 / 0
Supersport World Championship
Active years	2013–2014
Manufacturers	Honda
Starts / Wins / Podiums / Poles / F. laps / Points; 2 / 0 / 0 / 0 / 0 / 0

Pepijn Bijsterbosch (born 3 November 1989) is a Dutch motorcycle racer. He currently competes in the IDM Superbike Championship aboard a BMW S1000R.

== Career statistics ==
=== Career highlights ===
- 2017 - NC, European Superstock 1000 Championship, Yamaha YZF-R1

=== Grand Prix motorcycle racing ===
==== By season ====
Season	Class	Motorcycle	Team	Number	Race	Win	Podium	Pole	FLap	Pts	Plcd
2009	125cc	Honda	Racing Team Bijsterbosch	83	1	0	0	0	0	0	NC
2010	125cc	Honda	Racing Team Bijsterbosch	66	1	0	0	0	0	0	NC
Total					**2**	**0**	**0**	**0**	**0**	**0**	

==== Races by year ====
(key)

Year	Class	Bike	1	2	3	4	5	6	7	8	9	10	11	12	13	14	15	16	17	Pos.	Pts
2009	125cc	Honda	QAT	JPN	SPA	FRA	ITA	CAT	NED; 24	GER	GBR	CZE	INP	RSM	POR	AUS	MAL	VAL		NC	0
2010	125cc	Honda	QAT	SPA	FRA	ITA	GBR	NED; 23	CAT	GER	CZE	INP	RSM	ARA	JPN	MAL	AUS	POR	VAL	NC	0

=== Supersport World Championship ===
==== Races by year ====
(key)

Year	Bike	1	2	3	4	5	6	7	8	9	10	11	12	13	Pos.	Pts
2013	Yamaha	AUS	SPA	NED	ITA	GBR	POR	ITA	RUS	GBR	GER; 27	TUR	FRA	SPA	NC	0
2014	Yamaha	AUS	SPA	NED; 16	ITA	GBR	MAL	SMR	POR	SPA	FRA	QAT			NC	0

=== European Superstock 1000 Championship ===
==== Races by year ====
(key) (Races in bold indicate pole position) (Races in italics indicate fastest lap)

Year	Bike	1	2	3	4	5	6	7	8	9	Pos	Pts
2017	Yamaha	ARA	NED; 19	IMO	DON	MIS	LAU	ALG	MAG	JER	NC	0
