= Riccardo Russo =

Italian motorcycle racer (born 1992)

- Nationality: Italian
- Born: 10 October 1992 (age 34); Maddaloni, Italy
- Current team: C.M. Racing
- Bike number: 84
Motorcycle racing career statistics
Moto2 World Championship
Active years	2014
Manufacturers	Suter
Championships	0
2014 championship position	NC (0 pts)
Starts / Wins / Podiums / Poles / F. laps / Points; 5 / 0 / 0 / 0 / 0 / 0
Superbike World Championship
Active years	2014, 2017
Manufacturers	Kawasaki, Yamaha
Championships	0
2017 championship position	28th (13 pts)
Starts / Wins / Podiums / Poles / F. laps / Points; 25 / 0 / 0 / 0 / 0 / 18
Supersport World Championship
Active years	2013–2015
Manufacturers	Kawasaki, Honda
Championships	0
2015 championship position	16th (31 pts)
Starts / Wins / Podiums / Poles / F. laps / Points; 24 / 0 / 0 / 0 / 0 / 104

Riccardo Russo (born 10 October 1992, in Maddaloni) is an Italian motorcycle racer. In 2012, he was the CIV Superstock 600 champion and the European Superstock 600 Championship runner-up. He has also competed in the Superbike World Championship, the Supersport World Championship and the CIV Superbike Championship. He currently competes in the European Superstock 1000 Championship aboard a Kawasaki ZX-10R.

== Career statistics ==
=== Career highlights ===
2010 - 17th, European Superstock 600 Championship, Yamaha YZF-R6
2011 - 6th, European Superstock 600 Championship, Yamaha YZF-R6
2012 - 2nd, European Superstock 600 Championship, Yamaha YZF-R6
2014 - NC, FIM Superstock 1000 Cup, Kawasaki ZX-10R
2015 - 20th, FIM Superstock 1000 Cup, Yamaha YZF-R1
2016 - 9th, FIM Superstock 1000 Cup, Yamaha YZF-R1
2018 - 9th, European Superstock 1000 Championship, Kawasaki ZX-10R, Ducati 1199 Panigale

=== European Superstock 600 ===
==== Races by year ====
(key) (Races in bold indicate pole position, races in italics indicate fastest lap)

Year	Bike	1	2	3	4	5	6	7	8	9	10	Pos	Pts
2010	Yamaha	POR	VAL	ASS	MNZ; 4	MIS; Ret	BRN	SIL	NÜR	IMO; 5	MAG	18th	24
2011	Yamaha	ASS; 7	MNZ; 5	MIS; Ret	ARA; 7	BRN; 7	SIL; 3	NÜR; 7	IMO; 2	MAG; Ret	POR; 5	6th	94
2012	Yamaha	IMO; 1	ASS; 5	MNZ; 1	MIS; 2	ARA; 1	BRN; 3	SIL; 1	NÜR; 2	POR; 2	MAG; 2	2nd	207

=== Supersport World Championship ===
==== Races by year ====
(key) (Races in bold indicate pole position; races in italics indicate fastest lap)

Year	Bike	1	2	3	4	5	6	7	8	9	10	11	12	13	Pos	Pts
2013	Kawasaki	AUS	SPA; 5	NED; 14	ITA; 4	GBR; 14	POR; Ret	ITA; Ret	RUS	GBR; Ret	GER; 6	TUR	FRA; Ret	SPA; 6	14th	48
2014	Honda	AUS; 8	SPA; Ret	NED; 14	ITA; 8	GBR; 13	MAL; 12	ITA	POR	SPA	FRA	QAT			17th	25
2015	Honda	AUS; Ret	THA; Ret	SPA; 11	NED; 10	ITA; 8	GBR; 12	POR; Ret	ITA; 8	MAL	SPA	FRA	QAT		16th	31

=== Superstock 1000 Cup ===
==== Races by year ====
(key) (Races in bold indicate pole position) (Races in italics indicate fastest lap)

Year	Bike	1	2	3	4	5	6	7	8	Pos	Pts
2014	Kawasaki	ARA	NED	IMO	MIS	ALG; WD	JER	MAG		NC	0
2015	Yamaha	ARA	NED	IMO	DON	ALG	MIS	JER; 4	MAG; Ret	20th	13
2016	Yamaha	ARA; 4	NED; Ret	IMO	DON	MIS	LAU; 3	MAG; 6	JER; 6	9th	49

=== European Superstock 1000 Championship ===
==== Races by year ====
(key) (Races in bold indicate pole position) (Races in italics indicate fastest lap)

Year	Bike	1	2	3	4	5	6	7	8	Pos	Pts
2018	Kawasaki/Ducati	ARA; 9	NED; 9	IMO; Ret	DON; 7	BRN; 9	MIS; 3	ALG	MAG	9th	46

=== Superbike World Championship ===
==== Races by year ====
(key) (Races in bold indicate pole position; races in italics indicate fastest lap)

Year	Bike	1		2		3		4		5		6		7		8		9		10		11		12		13		Pos	Pts
Year	Bike	R1	R2	R1	R2	R1	R2	R1	R2	R1	R2	R1	R2	R1	R2	R1	R2	R1	R2	R1	R2	R1	R2	R1	R2	R1	R2	Pos	Pts
2014	Kawasaki	AUS	AUS	SPA	SPA	NED	NED	ITA	ITA	GBR	GBR	MAL	MAL	ITA; 17	ITA; 14	POR; 14	POR; 15	USA	USA	SPA	SPA	FRA	FRA	QAT	QAT			30th	5
2017	Yamaha	AUS; 16	AUS; Ret	THA; 17	THA; 12	SPA; 16	SPA; Ret	NED; Ret	NED; Ret	ITA; Ret	ITA; Ret	GBR; Ret	GBR; 12	ITA; Ret	ITA; DNS	USA	USA											28th	13
2017	Kawasaki																	GER; Ret	GER; Ret	POR; 14	POR; 14	FRA; 15	FRA; 16	SPA; 17	SPA; 16	QAT	QAT	28th	13

=== Grand Prix motorcycle racing ===
==== By season ====
Season	Class	Motorcycle	Team	Race	Win	Podium	Pole	FLap	Pts	Plcd
2014	Moto2	Suter	Tasca Racing Moto2	5	0	0	0	0	0	NC
Total				**5**	**0**	**0**	**0**	**0**	**0**	

==== Races by year ====
(key) (Races in bold indicate pole position; races in italics indicate fastest lap)

Year	Class	Bike	1	2	3	4	5	6	7	8	9	10	11	12	13	14	15	16	17	18	Pos	Pts
2014	Moto2	Suter	QAT	AME	ARG	SPA	FRA	ITA	CAT	NED	GER	INP	CZE; 23	GBR; 23	RSM; Ret	ARA; 24	JPN; Ret	AUS	MAL	VAL	NC	0
