= Kev Coghlan =

British motorcycle racer

- Nationality: British
- Born: 23 June 1988 (age 38); Perth, Scotland
Motorcycle racing career statistics
Moto2 World Championship
Active years	2010–2011
Manufacturers	FTR
Championships	0
2011 championship position	29th (11 pts)
Starts / Wins / Podiums / Poles / F. laps / Points; 8 / 0 / 0 / 0 / 0 / 11
125cc World Championship
Active years	2005, 2007
Manufacturers	Honda
Championships	0
2007 championship position	NC (0 pts)
Starts / Wins / Podiums / Poles / F. laps / Points; 3 / 0 / 0 / 0 / 0 / 0
Supersport World Championship
Active years	2008–2009, 2013–2014, 2017
Manufacturers	Honda, Yamaha, Kawasaki
Championships	0
2017 championship position	NC (0 pts)
Starts / Wins / Podiums / Poles / F. laps / Points; 30 / 0 / 3 / 1 / 1 / 186

Kev Alexander Coghlan (born 23 June 1988) is a British motorcycle racer. He has won the European Junior Supersport title in 2008 and the Spanish CEV Supersport Championship and the European Supersport title in 2009; he has also ridden in the 125cc and Moto2 World Championships, the Supersport World Championship and the FIM Superstock 1000 Cup.

== Career ==
In 2012, Coghlan split his program into British Supersport Championship aboard a Yamaha and the FIM Superstock 1000 Cup aboard a Ducati, due to the struggles of travelling too and from Britain and Europe Coghlan quit the British Supersport Championship to concentrate on the Superstock 1000 championship, this led to a vast improvement in his results scoring his first podium (2nd place) at Nürburgring and going on to finish ninth in the championship as well as ending up 17th in the British Supersport Championship.

== Career statistics ==
- 2012 - 9th, FIM Superstock 1000 Cup, Ducati 1098R
- 2015 - 6th, FIM Superstock 1000 Cup, Yamaha YZF-R1

=== Grand Prix motorcycle racing ===
==== By season ====
Season	Class	Motorcycle	Team	Race	Win	Podium	Pole	FLap	Pts	Plcd
2005	125cc	Honda	UK1 Racing	1	0	0	0	0	0	NC
2007	125cc	Honda	Humangest Racing Team 125cc	2	0	0	0	0	0	NC
2007	125cc	Honda	UK1 Racing	2	0	0	0	0	0	NC
2010	Moto2	FTR	Monlau Joey Darcey	2	0	0	0	0	0	NC
2011	Moto2	FTR	Aeroport de Castelló	6	0	0	0	0	11	29th
Total				**11**	**0**	**0**	**0**	**0**	**11**	

==== Races by year ====
(key)

Year	Class	Bike	1	2	3	4	5	6	7	8	9	10	11	12	13	14	15	16	17	Pos.	Pts
2005	125cc	Honda	SPA	POR	CHN	FRA	ITA	CAT	NED	GBR; Ret	GER	CZE	JPN	MAL	QAT	AUS	TUR	VAL		NC	0
2007	125cc	Honda	QAT	SPA	TUR; 21	CHN	FRA	ITA	CAT	GBR; Ret	NED	GER	CZE	RSM	POR	JPN	AUS	MAL	VAL	NC	0
2010	Moto2	FTR	QAT	SPA	FRA	ITA	GBR; 22	NED	CAT	GER	CZE	INP	RSM	ARA; Ret	JPN	MAL	AUS	POR	VAL	NC	0
2011	Moto2	FTR	QAT; Ret	SPA; 8	POR; DNS	FRA; 27	CAT; 24	GBR; 13	NED; 21	ITA	GER	CZE	INP	RSM	ARA	JPN	AUS	MAL	VAL	29th	11

=== Supersport World Championship ===
(key) (Races in bold indicate pole position) (Races in italics indicate fastest lap)

Year	Bike	1	2	3	4	5	6	7	8	9	10	11	12	13	14	Pos.	Pts
2008	Honda	QAT	AUS	SPA	NED; 21	ITA; 20	GER	SMR	CZE	GBR	EUR	ITA	FRA	POR		NC	0
2009	Yamaha	AUS	QAT	SPA	NED	ITA	RSA	USA	SMR; Ret	GBR; 13	CZE	GER; 20	ITA	FRA; 14	POR; 15	26th	6
2013	Kawasaki	AUS; 18	SPA; 13	NED; 8	ITA; 5	GBR; Ret	POR; Ret	ITA; Ret	RUS; C	GBR; 4	GER; 3	TUR; 7	FRA; 14	SPA; 7		9th	71
2014	Yamaha	AUS; 2	**SPA**; 5	NED; 4	ITA; Ret	GBR; 3	MAL; Ret	ITA; 8	POR; 7	SPA; 5	FRA; 6	QAT; 5				5th	109
2017	Yamaha	AUS	THA	SPA	NED	ITA	GBR	ITA	GER	POR	FRA	SPA; DNS	QAT			NC	0

=== British Supersport Championship ===
Year	Bike	1	2	3	4	5	6	7	8	9	10	11	12	Pos.	Pts	Ref
2009	Honda	BHI	OUL; 8	DON; 7	THR	SNE	KNO	MAL	BHGP	CAD	CRO	SIL	OUL	25th	17	

Year	Bike	1		2		3		4		5		6		7		8		9		10		11		12			Pos.	Pts	Ref
Year	Bike	R1	R2	R1	R2	R1	R2	R1	R2	R1	R2	R1	R2	R1	R2	R1	R2	R1	R2	R1	R2	R1	R2	R1	R2	R3	Pos.	Pts	Ref
2011	Yamaha	BRH	BRH	OUL	OUL	CRO	CRO	THR	THR	KNO	KNO	SNE	SNE	OUL; Ret	OUL; C	BRH	BRH	CAD	CAD	DON	DON	SIL	SIL	BRH	BRH	BRH	NC	0	
2012	Yamaha	BHI; 13	BHI; 9^{1}	THR; 9	THR; 11	OUL; 14	OUL; 11	SNE; 10	SNE; Ret	KNO; 12	KNO; Ret	OUL; 5	OUL; 8	BHGP	BHGP	CAD	CAD	DON	DON	ASS	ASS	SIL	SIL	BHGP	BHGP		17th	54.5	

=== Superstock 1000 Cup ===
==== Races by year ====
(key) (Races in bold indicate pole position) (Races in italics indicate fastest lap)

Year	Bike	1	2	3	4	5	6	7	8	9	10	Pos	Pts
2012	Ducati	IMO; 7	NED; 11	MNZ; WD	SMR; 8	ARA; 6	BRN; 11	SIL; 5	NŰR; 2	ALG; Ret	MAG	9th	68
2015	Yamaha	ARA; 3	NED; 6	IMO; 4	DON; 5	ALG; 5	MIS; 5	JER	MAG			6th	72

==== Notes ====
1. – Race was abandoned after second restart, half points awarded.
