= Çağrı Coşkun =

Turkish motorcycle racer (born 1984)

- Nationality: (Turkey) Turkish
- Born: April 23, 1984 (age 42); İzmir, Turkey
- Current team: Pacific Racing Team
- Bike number: 90

Çağrı Coşkun (born April 23, 1984, in İzmir, Turkey) is a Turkish professional motorcycle racer. He competes in the 600cc A category of the Turkish Championship.

Gaining a wildcard, Coşkun started in grid 34 at the 2013 Supersport World Championship's İstanbul Park round for Pacific Racing Team on Honda CBR600RR and raced without reaching the finish line.

== Racing record ==
=== Supersport World Championship ===
(key)

Year	Bike	1	2	3	4	5	6	7	8	9	10	11	12	13	Pos	Pts
2013	Honda	AUS	SPA	NED	ITA	GBR	POR	ITA	RUS	GBR	GER	TUR; Ret	FRA	SPA	NC*	0*

- * Season still in progress.
