= Roberto Tamburini =

Italian motorcycle racer (born 1991)

- Nationality: Italian
- Born: 15 January 1991 (age 35); Rimini, Italy
- Current team: Berclaz Racing Team
- Bike number: 2
Motorcycle racing career statistics
125cc World Championship
Active years	2006–2007
Manufacturers	Aprilia
Championships	0
2007 championship position	NC (0 pts)
Starts / Wins / Podiums / Poles / F. laps / Points; 33 / 0 / 0 / 0 / 0 / 0
Superbike World Championship
Active years	2022–
Manufacturers	Yamaha, Honda
Championships	0
2023 championship position	NC (0 pts)
Starts / Wins / Podiums / Poles / F. laps / Points; 30 / 0 / 0 / 0 / 0 / 36
Supersport World Championship
Active years	2010–2014
Manufacturers	Yamaha, Honda, Suzuki, Kawasaki
Championships	0
2014 championship position	11th (70 pts)
Starts / Wins / Podiums / Poles / F. laps / Points; 49 / 0 / 0 / 0 / 1 / 271

Roberto Tamburini (born 15 January 1991) is an Italian motorcycle racer. For 2022, he was a late addition to the 2022 Superbike World Championship, entered as riding for a one-bike Motoxracing Yamaha team.

Tamburini has competed in the European Superstock 1000 Championship and the CIV Superbike Championship aboard a BMW S1000RR. He has previously competed in the 125cc class of the Grand Prix Motorcycle World Championship. In 2010, he raced full-time in the Supersport class of the Italian national championship (CIV), winning the title by four points. He also took part in some World Supersport races, the Coppa Italia Yamaha R6 Cup, the Italian Superstock 600 Championship and the Supersport World Championship.

== Career ==
Tamburini made his Supersport World Championship debut in the 2010 Misano round, taking third on the grid and fifth place in his first race in the championship, missed the next round but returned in the Silverstone round. He qualified fourth on the grid, after a good start at the first corner he was clipped by championship challenger Joan Lascorz, causing Tamburini to be catapulted off his bike and into the fence between Copse and Maggotts corners.

Tamburini was lucky to have only broken a collar bone, Lascorz also suffered a concussion in the accident. He returned for the last three races, scoring three ninth places. With five races in total, he finished the championship in 14th position with 32 points. He decided to join the Supersport World Championship full-time in 2011, he remained with his team that he won the Italian CIV Supersport with; Bike Service R.T aboard a Yamaha YZF-R6. He finished the season in ninth overall with a best result of fourth at Silverstone. He joined Team Lorini for the 2012 Supersport World Championship season and rode a Honda CBR600R, he finished 12th in the standings with two fourth places at Imola and Misano. He left Team Lorini and signed to race for Suriano Racing Team to ride a Suzuki GSX-R600 for the 2013 season. He left the team after the Monza round and later rejoined Team Lorini to ride a Honda again from the Moscow round onwards.

== Career statistics ==
=== Career highlights ===
- 2009 - 17th, European Superstock 600 Championship, Yamaha YZF-R6
- 2015 - 2nd, FIM Superstock 1000 Cup, BMW S1000RR
- 2016 - 7th, FIM Superstock 1000 Cup, Aprilia RSV4
- 2017 - 4th, European Superstock 1000 Championship, Yamaha YZF-R1
- 2018 - 2nd, European Superstock 1000 Championship, BMW S1000RR

=== Grand Prix motorcycle racing ===
==== By season ====
Seas	Class	Moto	Team	Race	Win	Pod	Pole	FLap	Pts	Plcd	WCh
2006	125cc	Aprilia	Matteoni Racing	16	0	0	0	0	0	NC	–
2007	125cc	Aprilia	Team Sicilia	17	0	0	0	0	0	NC	–
Total				**33**	**0**	**0**	**0**	**0**	**0**		**0**

==== Races by year ====
Year	Class	Bike	1	2	3	4	5	6	7	8	9	10	11	12	13	14	15	16	17	Pos.	Pts
2006	125cc	Aprilia	SPA; 34	QAT; 29	TUR; 31	CHN; 29	FRA; Ret	ITA; 28	CAT; 30	NED; 27	GBR; 29	GER; Ret	CZE; 22	MAL; 19	AUS; 22	JPN; 18	POR; Ret	VAL; 17		NC	0
2007	125cc	Aprilia	QAT; 23	SPA; 25	TUR; 18	CHN; 20	FRA; 22	ITA; 24	CAT; 22	GBR; 29	NED; 22	GER; 20	CZE; 21	RSM; 19	POR; 22	JPN; 16	AUS; 23	MAL; 21	VAL; 19	NC	0

=== European Superstock 600 ===
==== Races by year ====
(key) (Races in bold indicate pole position, races in italics indicate fastest lap)

Year	Bike	1	2	3	4	5	6	7	8	9	10	Pos	Pts
2009	Yamaha	VAL	ASS	MNZ	MIS; 7	SIL	BRN	NÜR	IMO; 8	MAG	POR	17th	17

=== Supersport World Championship ===
==== By season ====
Season	Moto	Team	Race	Win	Pod	Pole	FLap	Pts	Plcd	WCh
2010	Yamaha YZF-R6	Bike Service Racing Team	4	0	0	0	0	32	14th	–
2011	Yamaha YZF-R6	Bike Service Racing Team	12	0	0	0	0	80	9th	–
2012	Honda CBR600RR	Team Lorini	13	0	0	0	0	50	12th	–
2013	Suzuki GSX-R600	Suriano Racing Team	9	0	0	0	0	39	16th	–
2013	Honda CBR600RR	Team Lorini	9	0	0	0	0	39	16th	–
2014	Kawasaki ZX-6R	San Carlo Puccetti Racing	11	0	0	0	1	70	11th	–
Total			**49**	**0**	**0**	**0**	**1**	**271**		**0**

==== Races by year ====
(key) (Races in bold indicate pole position; races in italics indicate fastest lap)

Year	Bike	1	2	3	4	5	6	7	8	9	10	11	12	13	Pos.	Pts
2010	Yamaha	AUS	POR	SPA	NED	ITA	RSA	USA	SMR; 5	CZE	GBR; DNS	GER; 9	ITA; 9	FRA; 9	14th	32
2011	Yamaha	AUS; 20	EUR; 12	NED; DSQ	ITA; 6	SMR; 9	SPA; 5	CZE; 5	GBR; 4	GER; 11	ITA; Ret	FRA; 7	POR; 6		9th	80
2012	Honda	AUS; Ret	ITA; 4	NED; 9	ITA; 16	EUR; 11	SMR; 4	SPA; 15	CZE; Ret	GBR; 12	RUS; 9	GER; Ret	POR; Ret	FRA; 25	12th	50
2013	Suzuki	AUS; 13	SPA; 15	NED; 26	ITA; 18	GBR	POR	ITA							16th	39
2013	Honda								RUS; C	GBR; 12	GER; 7	TUR; 6	FRA; 8	SPA; 12	16th	39
2014	Kawasaki	AUS; 5	SPA; 7	NED; 7	ITA; Ret	GBR; 8	MAL; Ret	ITA; 5	POR; Ret	SPA; 10	FRA; 7	QAT; 9			11th	70

=== Superstock 1000 Cup ===
==== Races by year ====
(key) (Races in bold indicate pole position) (Races in italics indicate fastest lap)

Year	Bike	1	2	3	4	5	6	7	8	Pos	Pts
2015	BMW	ARA; 1	NED; Ret	IMO; 2	DON; 2	ALG; 1	MIS; 3	JER; 1	MAG; 5	2nd	142
2016	Aprilia	ARA; Ret	NED; 20	IMO; 4	DON; 7	MIS; 5	LAU; 9	MAG; 4	JER; 4	7th	66

=== European Superstock 1000 Championship ===
==== Races by year ====
(key) (Races in bold indicate pole position) (Races in italics indicate fastest lap)

Year	Bike	1	2	3	4	5	6	7	8	9	Pos	Pts
2017	Yamaha	ARA; 3	NED; 9	IMO; 2	DON; 4	MIS; DNS	LAU; 3	ALG; 6	MAG; 4	JER; 5	4th	106
2018	BMW	ARA; 2	NED; 2	IMO; 2	DON; 3	BRN; 8	MIS; 4	ALG; 1	MAG; 2		2nd	142

=== Superbike World Championship ===
==== By season ====
Season	Class	Motorcycle	Team	Number	Race	Win	Podium	Pole	FLap	Pts	Plcd
2022	SBK	Yamaha	Yamaha Motoxracing WorldSBK Team	2	24	0	0	0	0	36	17th
2023	SBK	Yamaha	Yamaha Motoxracing WorldSBK Team	20	3	0	0	0	0	0	NC
2023	SBK	Honda	Petronas MIE Racing Honda Team	20	3	0	0	0	0	0	NC
Total					**30**	**0**	**0**	**0**	**0**	**36**	

==== Races by year ====
(key) (Races in bold indicate pole position) (Races in italics indicate fastest lap)

Year	Bike	1			2			3			4			5			6			7			8			9			10			11			12			13			Pos	Pts
Year	Bike	R1	SR	R2	R1	SR	R2	R1	SR	R2	R1	SR	R2	R1	SR	R2	R1	SR	R2	R1	SR	R2	R1	SR	R2	R1	SR	R2	R1	SR	R2	R1	SR	R2	R1	SR	R2	R1	SR	R2	Pos	Pts
2022	Yamaha	SPA; 17	SPA; 15	SPA; 14	NED; 14	NED; 16	NED; 11	POR	POR	POR	ITA; 11	ITA; 17	ITA; 12	GBR; 21	GBR; 21	GBR; 21	CZE; 21	CZE; 20	CZE; 11	FRA; 19	FRA; 19	FRA; 14	SPA; 13	SPA; 15	SPA; 10	POR; 16	POR; Ret	POR; 14	ARG	ARG	ARG	INA	INA	INA	AUS	AUS	AUS				17th	36
2023	Honda	AUS	AUS	AUS	INA	INA	INA	NED	NED	NED	SPA	SPA	SPA	EMI	EMI	EMI	GBR	GBR	GBR	ITA; 18	ITA; 21	ITA; 18	CZE	CZE	CZE	FRA	FRA	FRA	SPA	SPA	SPA	POR	POR	POR	JER	JER	JER				NC	0
2023	Yamaha	AUS	AUS	AUS	INA	INA	INA	NED	NED	NED	SPA	SPA	SPA	EMI	EMI	EMI	GBR	GBR	GBR	ITA	ITA	ITA	CZE; 19	CZE; 18	CZE; 16	FRA	FRA	FRA	SPA	SPA	SPA	POR	POR	POR	JER	JER	JER				NC	0

^{*} Season still in progress.

=== FIM Endurance World Cup ===
Year	Team	Bike	Tyre	Rider	Pts	TC
2025	(Italy) Honda No Limits	Honda CBR1000RR	**D**	(Japan) Kaito Toba (Italy) Gabriele Giannini (Italy) Roberto Tamburini (Italy) Edoardo Sintoni	49*	6th*
