= Florian Marino =

French motorcycle racer (born 1993)

- Nationality: French
- Born: 3 June 1993 (age 33); Cannes, France
- Current team: Elf Marc VDS Racing Team/KM99
- Bike number: 99
Motorcycle racing career statistics
Moto2 World Championship
Active years	2014
Manufacturers	Kalex
Championships	0
2014 championship position	NC (0 pts)
Starts / Wins / Podiums / Poles / F. laps / Points; 6 / 0 / 0 / 0 / 0 / 0
Superbike World Championship
Active years	2018, 2023
Manufacturers	Honda
Championships	0
2023 championship position	24th (1 pts)
Starts / Wins / Podiums / Poles / F. laps / Points; 5 / 0 / 0 / 0 / 0 / 6
Supersport World Championship
Active years	2010–2014
Manufacturers	Honda, Kawasaki
Championships	0
2014 championship position	3rd (125 pts)
Starts / Wins / Podiums / Poles / F. laps / Points; 36 / 0 / 5 / 1 / 0 / 269

Florian Christophe Marino (born 3 June 1993 in Cannes, France) is a French motorcycle racer, currently competing in the FIM Endurance World Championship for Elf Marc VDS Racing Team/KM99. He previously competed in the Spanish Superbike Championship, aboard a BMW S1000RR. As a test rider for Kawasaki, Marino raced in the 2023 Superbike World Championship in Aragon for one round, and in 2018, he replaced PJ Jacobsen on the Triple M Honda Fireblade for two races of the Superbike World Championship in Argentina. He has also raced in Moto2 for six races in 2014.

== Career ==
Marino began racing Motocross in 2004 before switching to Road racing in 2005. In 2005, he won the Conti Cup 50, and in 2007, he won the French Junior Cup on a Honda CBR 125.

=== World Superbike ===
==== Bimota by Kawasaki Racing Team (2025-) ====
Marino was appointed as Bimota test riders for the 2025 WorldSBK season, as the Italian factory looked to develop its new KB998 bike with Xavi Forés and Xavier Artigas.

== Career statistics ==
=== Career highlights ===
2009 - 12th, European Superstock 600 Championship, Honda CBR600RR
2010 - 2nd, European Superstock 600 Championship, Honda CBR600RR
2015 - 11th, FIM Superstock 1000 Cup, Yamaha YZF-R1
2016 - 22nd, FIM Superstock 1000 Cup, Yamaha YZF-R1
2017 - 3rd, European Superstock 1000 Championship, Yamaha YZF-R1
2018 - 5th, European Superstock 1000 Championship, Yamaha YZF-R1

=== Red Bull MotoGP Rookies Cup ===
==== Races by year ====
(key) (Races in bold indicate pole position, races in italics indicate fastest lap)

Year	1	2	3	4	5	6	7	8	9	10	Pos	Pts
2008	SPA1; 11	SPA2; 11	POR; 13	FRA; 5	ITA; 19	GBR; Ret	NED; 5	GER; 7	CZE1; 7	CZE2; 5	10th	62
2009	SPA1; Ret	SPA2; 4	ITA; 4	NED; 4	GER; 5	GBR; 6	CZE1; 1	CZE2; 7			5th	94

=== European Superstock 600 ===
==== Races by year ====
(key) (Races in bold indicate pole position, races in italics indicate fastest lap)

Year	Bike	1	2	3	4	5	6	7	8	9	10	Pos	Pts
2009	Honda	VAL	ASS	MNZ	MIS	SIL	BRN	NÜR	IMO; 10	MAG; 1	POR; 7	12th	40
2010	Honda	POR; NC	VAL; 1	ASS; 1	MNZ; 3	MIS; 2	BRN; 2	SIL; 2	NÜR; 8	IMO; 1	MAG	2nd	159

=== Supersport World Championship ===
==== Races by year ====
(key) (Races in bold indicate pole position; races in italics indicate fastest lap)

Year	Bike	1	2	3	4	5	6	7	8	9	10	11	12	13	Pos	Pts
2010	Honda	AUS	POR	SPA	NED	ITA	RSA	USA	SMR	CZE	GBR	GER	ITA	FRA; 12	29th	4
2011	Honda	AUS; 7	EUR; 8	NED; Ret	ITA; 7	SMR; 11	SPA; 10	CZE; 9	GBR; 9	GER; 9	ITA; 4	FRA; 9	POR; 5		8th	89
2012	Kawasaki	AUS	ITA	NED	ITA	EUR	SMR	SPA	CZE; 13	GBR; 19	RUS; 14	GER; 12	POR; 16	FRA; 11	26th	14
2013	Kawasaki	AUS	SPA; Ret	NED; 5	ITA; 2	GBR; 21	POR	ITA; 8	RUS; C	GBR; 8	GER; 10	TUR; 19	FRA; WD	SPA	13th	53
2014	Kawasaki	AUS; 4	SPA; 3	**NED**; 2	ITA; 3	GBR; 5	MAL; Ret	SMR; 7	POR; 8	SPA; 3	FRA; 5	QAT; 11			**3rd**	**125**

=== Grand Prix motorcycle racing ===
==== By season ====
Season	Class	Motorcycle	Race	Win	Podium	Pole	FLap	Pts	Plcd
2014	Moto2	Kalex	6	0	0	0	0	0	NC
Total			**6**	**0**	**0**	**0**	**0**	**0**	

==== Races by year ====
(key) (Races in bold indicate pole position; races in italics indicate fastest lap)

Year	Class	Bike	1	2	3	4	5	6	7	8	9	10	11	12	13	14	15	16	17	18	Pos	Pts
2014	Moto2	Kalex	QAT	AME	ARG	SPA	FRA	ITA	CAT	NED	GER	IND	CZE	GBR	RSM; 24	ARA; 28	JPN; 20	AUS; 25	MAL; 16	VAL; 23	NC	0

=== British Superbike Championship ===
Year	Make	1		2		3			4		5		6			7			8			9			10		11		12			Pos	Pts
Year	Make	R1	R2	R1	R2	R1	R2	R3	R1	R2	R1	R2	R1	R2	R3	R1	R2	R3	R1	R2	R3	R1	R2	R3	R1	R2	R1	R2	R1	R2	R3	Pos	Pts
2012	Aprilia	BHI; Ret	BHI; C	THR; Ret	THR; 24	OUL; 22	OUL; Ret	OUL; Ret	SNE; Ret	SNE; Ret	KNO; 19	KNO; 19	OUL; 17	OUL; 19	OUL; 21	BHGP	BHGP		CAD	CAD		DON	DON		ASS	ASS	SIL	SIL	BHGP	BHGP	BHGP	NC	0

=== Superstock 1000 Cup ===
==== Races by year ====
(key) (Races in bold indicate pole position) (Races in italics indicate fastest lap)

Year	Bike	1	2	3	4	5	6	7	8	Pos	Pts
2015	Yamaha	ARA; 7	NED; 7	IMO; Ret	DON	ALG; 11	MIS; DNS	JER	MAG	11th	23
2016	Kawasaki	ARA; 5	NED; DNS	IMO	DON	MIS	LAU	MAG	JER	22nd	11

=== European Superstock 1000 Championship ===
==== Races by year ====
(key) (Races in bold indicate pole position) (Races in italics indicate fastest lap)

Year	Bike	1	2	3	4	5	6	7	8	9	Pos	Pts
2017	Yamaha	ARA; 2	NED; 3	IMO; Ret	DON; 2	MIS; 5	LAU; 4	ALG; 2	MAG; 2	JER; 20	3rd	120
2018	Yamaha	ARA; 5	NED; 5	IMO; 7	DON; 5	BRN; 3	MIS; 7	ALG; 4	MAG; 4		5th	93

=== Superbike World Championship ===
==== Races by year ====
(key) (Races in bold indicate pole position; races in italics indicate fastest lap)

Year	Bike	1		2		3		4		5		6		7		8		9		10		11		12		13		Pos	Pts
Year	Bike	R1	R2	R1	R2	R1	R2	R1	R2	R1	R2	R1	R2	R1	R2	R1	R2	R1	R2	R1	R2	R1	R2	R1	R2	R1	R2	Pos	Pts
2018	Honda	AUS	AUS	THA	THA	SPA	SPA	NED	NED	ITA	ITA	GBR	GBR	CZE	CZE	USA	USA	ITA	ITA	POR	POR	FRA	FRA	ARG; 11	ARG; Ret	QAT	QAT	23rd	5

(key) (Races in bold indicate pole position) (Races in italics indicate fastest lap)

Year	Bike	1			2			3			4			5			6			7			8			9			10			11			12			Pos	Pts
Year	Bike	R1	SR	R2	R1	SR	R2	R1	SR	R2	R1	SR	R2	R1	SR	R2	R1	SR	R2	R1	SR	R2	R1	SR	R2	R1	SR	R2	R1	SR	R2	R1	SR	R2	R1	SR	R2	Pos	Pts
2023	Kawasaki	AUS	AUS	AUS	INA	INA	INA	NED	NED	NED	SPA	SPA	SPA	ITA	ITA	ITA	GBR	GBR	GBR	IMO	IMO	IMO	CZE	CZE	CZE	FRA	FRA	FRA	SPA; 16	SPA; 16	SPA; 15	POR	POR	POR	JER	JER	JER	24th	1

^{*} Season still in progress.

=== FIM World Endurance Championship ===
==== By team ====
Year	Team	Bike	Rider	TC
2025	(Belgium) Elf Marc VDS KM99	Yamaha YZF-R1	(France) Jérémy Guarnoni (Italy) Alessandro del Bianco (France) Florian Marino (France) Randy de Puniet	9th

=== Suzuka 8 Hours results ===
Year	Class	Team	Co-riders	Bike	Pos
2025	**EWC**	(Belgium) Elf Marc VDS KM99	(France) Jérémy Guarnoni (France) Randy de Puniet	Yamaha YZF-R1	9th
2026	**EWC**	(Belgium) Elf Marc VDS KM99	(France) Randy de Puniet (Italy) Alessandro Delbianco	Yamaha YZF-R1	30th
