= 2027 FIM Motocross World Championship =

World championship of motocross in 2027

The 2027 FIM Motocross World Championship will be the 71st FIM Motocross World Championship season. The championship will be contested over twenty rounds in Europe, Asia, South America and Australia, starting in Almonte on 28 February and ending in Switzerland on 3 October.

In the MXGP class, Jeffrey Herlings will be the defending champion, after winning his sixth world title in the 2026 season. Guillem Farrés won the MX2 title in 2026 and will move up to MXGP with Triumph, so the MX2 class will have a new champion. The season brings a new Chinese manufacturer, ZXMOTO, into the premier class, along with notable rider and team changes: Romain Febvre leaves Kawasaki for Ducati, Lucas Coenen and Sacha Coenen move to the United States, and Yamaha restructures its MXGP programme and ends its factory involvement in MX2.

== Teams and riders ==
=== Team changes ===
==== New manufacturers ====
ZXMOTO will make its MXGP debut in 2027, with Jacky Martens' JM Racing running the factory programme. The bikes were shown at the EICMA show in Milan in early November 2026. The line-up is Spaniard Oriol Oliver and Norwegian Kevin Horgmo. The company had said in September that it planned to contest the full series with a 450 cc machine developed between China and Europe.

Kove announced on 31 August 2026 that it would enter MXGP in 2027 with two machines and Tom Steensels as team manager. On 29 October 2026, Steensels announced that he had ended his involvement, saying Kove had been unable to provide the budget needed to compete in a full MXGP season at a professional and competitive level. No team structure or riders had been announced by early November 2026, and Kove's plans for 2027 remained unclear.

==== Triumph ====
Triumph will enter the MXGP class for the first time with Triumph Factory Racing, which the manufacturer describes as its first official factory entry in MXGP. Farrés signed a three-year contract to ride the Triumph TF 450-X from 2027, and Mikkel Haarup will join him in a two-rider MXGP line-up. Camden McLellan stays with the team in MX2.

==== Ducati ====
Febvre will ride for the Red Bull Ducati Factory MXGP Team, managed by Louis Vosters, on a two-year contract covering 2027 and 2028. He will ride the Ducati Desmo450 MX. The Kawasaki Racing Team announced that it would part ways with Febvre at the end of 2026.

==== KTM ====
Red Bull KTM Factory Racing announced its 2027 line-up on 4 November 2026. Maxime Renaux joins Andrea Adamo in the MXGP class on the KTM 450 SX-F. In MX2, Valerio Lata rides for the De Carli team, and Simon Längenfelder is joined by Jānis Reišulis, who finished sixth in the 2026 MX2 standings. The Van Venrooy KTM Racing team fields Kārlis Reišulis and Australian Byron Dennis with factory support.

==== Honda ====
Honda HRC Petronas will field a new MX2 line-up of Maxime Grau and Julius Mikula, both aged 20, announced on 2 November 2026. Taiga Yanase, the 2026 All-Japan Motocross IA2 champion, will also compete in the MX2 World Championship in 2027. HRC signed the 21-year-old for the 2026 season as part of its "From Asia to the World" programme.

==== Yamaha ====
On 14 October 2026, Yamaha Motor Europe confirmed a restructuring of its MXGP programme. The Yamaha Factory Racing MXGP team will move to an in-house operating model run by Yamaha Motor Europe, with development centralised at a new Motorsport Research and Development facility at the Yamaha Campus in Gerno di Lesmo, Italy. Yamaha ended its factory involvement in MX2 with immediate effect, which concludes its work with the Kemea Team in that class, and restructured its EMX250 and EMX125 programmes. The manufacturer said full details of the management and rider line-up would follow.

Rubén Fernández will ride a factory YZ450FM alongside Tim Gajser, who remains under contract for 2027.

=== Rider changes ===
Rider	2026 class	2026 team or series	2027 class	2027 team or series	Ref.
(France) Romain Febvre	MXGP	Kawasaki Racing Team	MXGP	Red Bull Ducati Factory MXGP Team	
(Spain) Guillem Farrés	MX2	Triumph	MXGP	Triumph Factory Racing	
(Belgium) Lucas Coenen	MXGP	Red Bull KTM	AMA 450SX/MX	Red Bull KTM	
(Spain) Oriol Oliver	MXGP	SS24 Gabriel KTM	MXGP	ZXMOTO (JM Racing)	
(Norway) Kevin Horgmo	MXGP	SR Motoblouz Honda	MXGP	ZXMOTO (JM Racing)	
(Belgium) Sacha Coenen	MX2	Red Bull KTM	AMA 250SX/MX	Red Bull KTM	
(Latvia) Jānis Reišulis	MX2	Yamaha	MX2	Red Bull KTM	
(Italy) Valerio Lata	MX2	Honda HRC	MX2	Red Bull KTM (De Carli)	
(France) Maxime Grau	MX2	Maddii Racing	MX2	Honda HRC Petronas	

Lucas and Sacha Coenen signed a multi-year contract extension with Red Bull KTM and will leave the world championship for the SuperMotocross series in the United States. Lucas will race in the 450 class and Sacha in the 250 class.

== Race calendar and results ==
The provisional calendar was published by the promoter, Infront Moto Racing, and the FIM. The Motocross of Nations will take place at the TT Circuit Assen in the Netherlands, and the FIM Junior Motocross World Championship on 18 July in Pärnu, Estonia.

=== Calendar changes ===
- Mérida joins the calendar. On 2 October 2026, Infront Moto Racing announced that Mérida, the capital of Extremadura, would host the MXGP of Spain on 17 and 18 April 2027. The weekend will also include rounds of the EMX250 and EMX125 European Championships. Seventy 6 Motion will organise both Spanish rounds, in Mérida and Andalucia, under three-year agreements running from 2027 to the end of the 2029 season.
- Spain becomes the MXGP of Extremadura. On 15 October 2026, the promoter confirmed that the Mérida round on 18 April would be named the MXGP of Extremadura.
- Águeda confirmed. The same announcement confirmed that the MXGP of Portugal will be held at Águeda on 22 and 23 May 2027, the venue's 28th World Championship event.
- Ziyang joins the calendar. The updated calendar lists round 18 on 12 September 2027 as the MXGP of Ziyang, at Ziyang in China. The round had previously been listed as to be announced. China will host two rounds in 2027, the other being the MXGP of China in Shanghai on 2 May.
- Other changes from 2026. The calendar has twenty rounds, one more than in 2026. South Africa and Lacapelle-Marival are not included, and Mérida, Ziyang and Saint-Jean-d'Angély are new venues. The venue for the Swiss round on 3 October has not been announced.

=== Circuits and contracts ===
- Lommel: On 4 October 2026, at the Motocross of Nations in Ernée, Infront announced a five-year renewal for the MXGP of Flanders at Lommel, running through the end of the 2031 season. Lommel has hosted the world championship since 1990.
- Uddevalla: The MXGP of Sweden at Uddevalla was renewed for a further three years, announced on 4 October 2026.
- Motocross of Nations: The 2027 Monster Energy FIM Motocross of Nations will take place from 8 to 10 October 2027 at the TT Circuit Assen, which last hosted the event in 2019. Organisers and Infront are working on a new track layout. Tickets went on sale on 4 October 2026.

=== MXGP ===
Round	Date	Grand Prix	Location	Pole position	Race 1 Winner	Race 2 Winner	Round Winner	Report
1	28 February	(Andalusia) MXGP of Andalucia	Almonte					
2	14 March	MXGP of Argentina	Bariloche					
3	28 March	MXGP of Italy	Montevarchi					
4	4 April	(Sardinia) MXGP of Sardegna	Riola Sardo					
5	18 April	MXGP of Extremadura	Mérida					
6	25 April	MXGP of Trentino	Pietramurata					
7	2 May	MXGP of China	Shanghai					
8	23 May	MXGP of Portugal	Águeda					
9	30 May	MXGP of France	Saint-Jean-d'Angély					
10	13 June	MXGP of Latvia	Ķegums					
11	20 June	MXGP of Germany	Teutschenthal					
12	27 June	(United Kingdom) MXGP of Great Britain	Foxhill					
13	25 July	MXGP of Czech Republic	Loket					
14	1 August	MXGP of Flanders	Lommel					
15	15 August	MXGP of Sweden	Uddevalla					
16	22 August	MXGP of The Netherlands	Arnhem					
17	5 September	(Turkey) MXGP of Türkiye	Afyonkarahisar					
18	12 September	(China) MXGP of Ziyang	Ziyang					
19	19 September	MXGP of Australia	Darwin					
20	3 October	MXGP of Switzerland	TBA					

=== MX2 ===
Round	Date	Grand Prix	Location	Pole position	Race 1 Winner	Race 2 Winner	Round Winner	Report
1	28 February	(Andalusia) MXGP of Andalucia	Almonte					
2	14 March	MXGP of Argentina	Bariloche					
3	28 March	MXGP of Italy	Montevarchi					
4	4 April	(Sardinia) MXGP of Sardegna	Riola Sardo					
5	18 April	MXGP of Extremadura	Mérida					
6	25 April	MXGP of Trentino	Pietramurata					
7	2 May	MXGP of China	Shanghai					
8	23 May	MXGP of Portugal	Águeda					
9	30 May	MXGP of France	Saint-Jean-d'Angély					
10	13 June	MXGP of Latvia	Ķegums					
11	20 June	MXGP of Germany	Teutschenthal					
12	27 June	(United Kingdom) MXGP of Great Britain	Foxhill					
13	25 July	MXGP of Czech Republic	Loket					
14	1 August	MXGP of Flanders	Lommel					
15	15 August	MXGP of Sweden	Uddevalla					
16	22 August	MXGP of The Netherlands	Arnhem					
17	5 September	(Turkey) MXGP of Türkiye	Afyonkarahisar					
18	12 September	(China) MXGP of Ziyang	Ziyang					
19	19 September	MXGP of Australia	Darwin					
20	3 October	MXGP of Switzerland	TBA					

=== Grand Prix locations ===
Location of non-European Grands Prix in 2027.
Location of European Grands Prix in 2027.

== See also ==
- 2027 FIM Women's Motocross World Championship
- 2027 European Motocross Championship
- 2027 Motocross des Nations
- 2027 FIM Supercross World Championship
- 2027 AMA Supercross Championship
- 2027 AMA National Motocross Championship
- 2027 SuperMotocross World Championship
- 2027 ADAC MX Masters
- 2027 British Motocross Championship
- 2027 Dutch Masters of Motocross
- 2027 French Elite Motocross Championship
- 2027 Italian Prestige Motocross Championship
- 2027 Spanish Motocross Championship
- 2027 ProMX Championship
- 2027 New Zealand Motocross Championship
- 2027 Swedish Motocross Championship
