= Zhang Xue =

Zhang Xue may refer to:

- Zhang Xue (geneticist) (born 1964), Chinese geneticist
- Zhang Xue (entrepreneur) (born 1987), Chinese entrepreneur and founder of ZXMOTO
  - ZXMOTO, known in Chinese as Zhang Xue Moto
