= 2027 New Zealand Motocross Championship =

New Zealand Motocross Competition in 2027

The 2027 New Zealand Motocross Championship season, known for sponsorship reasons as the Yamaha New Zealand Motocross Championship, is the 53rd New Zealand Motocross Championship season.

The series consists of four rounds across North Island, running from November 2026 to late February 2027. Similar to the previous season, the championship began prior to the new year.

Maximus Purvis is the reigning champion in the MX1 class, after picking up his fifth national title in the 2026 season.

In the MX2 class, Hayden Draper is the reigning champion, after picking up his first senior national title in the previous season.

== Race calendar and results ==
=== MX1 ===
Round	Date	Location	Race 1 Winner	Race 2 Winner	Race 3 Winner	Round Winner
1	14 November 2026	Tokoroa	(New Zealand) Josiah Natzke	(New Zealand) Maximus Purvis	(New Zealand) Maximus Purvis	(New Zealand) Maximus Purvis
2	28 November 2026	Patetonga				
3	20 February	Taranaki				
4	27 February	Rotorua				

=== MX2 ===
Round	Date	Location	Race 1 Winner	Race 2 Winner	Race 3 Winner	Round Winner
1	14 November 2026	Tokoroa	(New Zealand) James Scott	(New Zealand) Phoenix van Dusschoten	(New Zealand) Phoenix van Dusschoten	(New Zealand) Phoenix van Dusschoten
2	28 November 2026	Patetonga				
3	20 February	Taranaki				
4	27 February	Rotorua				

=== Circuit locations ===
2027 New Zealand Motocross Championship locations

== MX1 ==
=== Participants ===
Team	Constructor	No	Rider	Rounds
Brent Scammell Honda Race Team	Honda	3	(New Zealand) Jack Symon	1
CML KTM Racing	KTM	4	(Australia) Ryley Fitzpatrick	1
Kove New Zealand	Kove	20	(New Zealand) Max Winders	1
Kove New Zealand	Kove	972	(New Zealand) Carlin Hedley	1
Honda Motul Racing New Zealand	Honda	30	(New Zealand) Josiah Natzke	1
Monster Energy JCR Yamaha	Yamaha	44	(New Zealand) Maximus Purvis	1
Alpinestars Best Build Racing	Honda	45	(Australia) Jet Alsop	1
Huka Honda	Honda	60	(New Zealand) Jacob Steel	1
Bike Torque Taumaranui	Gas Gas	90	(New Zealand) Blake Maitland	1
Bike Torque Taumaranui	Gas Gas	921	(New Zealand) Luke Maitland	1
Bike Torque Taumaranui	Gas Gas	931	(New Zealand) Alex Maitland	1
	Yamaha	255	(New Zealand) Luke van der Lee	1
Stihl Shop Hamilton East	Husqvarna	336	(New Zealand) Joel Hansen	1
Whites Powersports NZ/Kawasaki NZ	Kawasaki	394	(New Zealand) Richard Horne	1
	Honda	720	(New Zealand) Allen Nickalls	1
	KTM	746	(New Zealand) Rhys Johnstone	1
Pro Moto/FXR NZ/Guts Seats	Yamaha	929	(New Zealand) Tyler Steiner	1

=== Riders Championship ===
Points are awarded to finishers of the main races, in the following format:

Position	1st	2nd	3rd	4th	5th	6th	7th	8th	9th	10th	11th	12th	13th	14th	15th	16th	17th	18th	19th	20th
Points	25	22	20	18	16	15	14	13	12	11	10	9	8	7	6	5	4	3	2	1

Pos	Rider	Bike	TOK			PAT	TAR	ROT	Points
1	(New Zealand) Maximus Purvis	Yamaha	3	1	1				70
2	(New Zealand) Josiah Natzke	Honda	1	2	2				69
3	(Australia) Jet Alsop	Honda	2	4	4				58
4	(New Zealand) Tyler Steiner	Yamaha	4	8	3				51
5	(Australia) Ryley Fitzpatrick	KTM	5	3	6				51
6	(New Zealand) Jack Symon	Honda	6	5	7				45
7	(New Zealand) Alex Maitland	Gas Gas	7	7	8				41
8	(New Zealand) Luke van der Lee	Yamaha	8	9	9				37
9	(New Zealand) Luke Maitland	Gas Gas	Ret	6	5				31
10	(New Zealand) Richard Horne	Kawasaki	10	11	11				31
11	(New Zealand) Carlin Hedley	Kove	9	10	16				28
12	(New Zealand) Rhys Johnstone	KTM	11	14	12				26
13	(New Zealand) Joel Hansen	Husqvarna	13	13	13				24
14	(New Zealand) Max Winders	Kove	12	15	14				22
15	(New Zealand) Jacob Steel	Honda	Ret	12	10				20
16	(New Zealand) Allen Nickalls	Honda	14	16	15				18
	(New Zealand) Blake Maitland	Gas Gas	Ret	DNS	DNS				0
Pos	Rider	Bike	TOK			PAT	TAR	ROT	Points

== MX2 ==
=== Participants ===
Team	Constructor	No	Rider	Rounds
CML KTM Racing	KTM	10	(United Kingdom) Alexander Brown	1
CML KTM Racing	KTM	28	(New Zealand) Ryan Hayward	1
Valley D'vine Eskdale	Yamaha	33	(New Zealand) Jayden Bryant	1
Alpinestars Best Build Racing	Honda	34	(New Zealand) Curtis King	1
Alpinestars Best Build Racing	Honda	110	(New Zealand) Rian King	1
Honda Motul Racing New Zealand	Honda	66	(New Zealand) Jack Ellingham	1
Southland Honda	Honda	93	(New Zealand) Jack Treloar	1
KTM NZ/Multiline	KTM	99	(New Zealand) Alex Garland	1
Team Rees Motorcycles	Honda	100	(New Zealand) Aydan Hall	1
Whites Powersports NZ/Kawasaki NZ	Kawasaki	105	(New Zealand) Arama Te Whetu	1
Monster Energy JCR Yamaha	Yamaha	108	(New Zealand) James Scott	1
Pumpn/Boyds Motorcycles	KTM	112	(New Zealand) Cooper Phillips	1
Josh Coppins Motorcycles	Yamaha	122	(New Zealand) Wills Harvey	1
	Gas Gas	137	(New Zealand) Leo Copping	1
Timaru Honda	Honda	152	(New Zealand) Riley Caird	1
Team MR Motorcycles	Yamaha	192	(New Zealand) Reuben Smith	1
Team MR Motorcycles	KTM	999	(New Zealand) Jared Hannon	1
Fasthouse NZ/Taylor Family Farm	Honda	199	(New Zealand) Travis Taylor	1
Leamington Meat Packers	KTM	207	(New Zealand) Jack Hazelden	1
Watson Motorcycles	Husqvarna	272	(New Zealand) Bo Phillips	1
Rae Emerson Motorsport	KTM	278	(New Zealand) Yanni Emerson-Rae	1
Yamaha NZ/Bradleys	Yamaha	309	(New Zealand) Nixon Parkes	1
Nelson Motorcycles	KTM	433	(New Zealand) Luke Heaphy	1
Deez-Al Limited/Cream Mile	Yamaha	464	(New Zealand) Kaleb Ford	1
Kawasaki NZ/Team Green	Kawasaki	488	(New Zealand) Riley Soutar	1
Paragon Motorcycles	Yamaha	691	(New Zealand) Ben Valois	1
LMC Husqvarna Racing	Husqvarna	722	(New Zealand) Phoenix van Dusschoten	1
MAKZ Gear/CML KTM	KTM	758	(New Zealand) Ethan Raynel	1

=== Riders Championship ===
Points are awarded to finishers of the main races, in the following format:

Position	1st	2nd	3rd	4th	5th	6th	7th	8th	9th	10th	11th	12th	13th	14th	15th	16th	17th	18th	19th	20th
Points	25	22	20	18	16	15	14	13	12	11	10	9	8	7	6	5	4	3	2	1

Pos	Rider	Bike	TOK			PAT	TAR	ROT	Points
1	(New Zealand) Phoenix van Dusschoten	Husqvarna	2	1	1				72
2	(New Zealand) James Scott	Yamaha	1	3	2				67
3	(United Kingdom) Alexander Brown	KTM	3	7	3				54
4	(New Zealand) Jack Ellingham	Honda	10	2	4				51
5	(New Zealand) Jared Hannon	KTM	4	4	6				51
6	(New Zealand) Rian King	Honda	5	5	5				48
7	(New Zealand) Curtis King	Honda	6	8	7				42
8	(New Zealand) Jack Treloar	Honda	7	6	8				42
9	(New Zealand) Wills Harvey	Yamaha	8	11	15				29
10	(New Zealand) Nixon Parkes	Yamaha	14	12	9				28
11	(New Zealand) Reuben Smith	Yamaha	12	13	11				27
12	(New Zealand) Cooper Phillips	KTM	Ret	9	10				23
13	(New Zealand) Luke Heaphy	KTM	13	14	14				22
14	(New Zealand) Ryan Hayward	KTM	Ret	10	12				20
15	(New Zealand) Aydan Hall	Honda	11	Ret	13				18
16	(New Zealand) Alex Garland	KTM	16	15	16				16
17	(New Zealand) Jack Hazelden	KTM	17	16	17				13
18	(New Zealand) Arama Te Whetu	Kawasaki	9	Ret	23				12
19	(New Zealand) Bo Phillips	Husqvarna	15	Ret	18				9
20	(New Zealand) Yanni Emerson-Rae	KTM	20	17	19				7
21	(New Zealand) Riley Soutar	Kawasaki	19	18	20				6
22	(New Zealand) Ethan Raynel	KTM	18	Ret	22				3
23	(New Zealand) Riley Caird	Honda	21	19	21				2
24	(New Zealand) Kaleb Ford	Yamaha	22	20	24				1
	(New Zealand) Jayden Bryant	Yamaha	23	21	25				0
	(New Zealand) Travis Taylor	Honda	Ret	DNS	DNS				0
	(New Zealand) Ben Valois	Yamaha	Ret	DNS	DNS				0
	(New Zealand) Leo Copping	Gas Gas	DNS	DNS	DNS				0
Pos	Rider	Bike	TOK			PAT	TAR	ROT	Points
