= Albert Arenas =

Spanish motorcycle racer (born 1996)

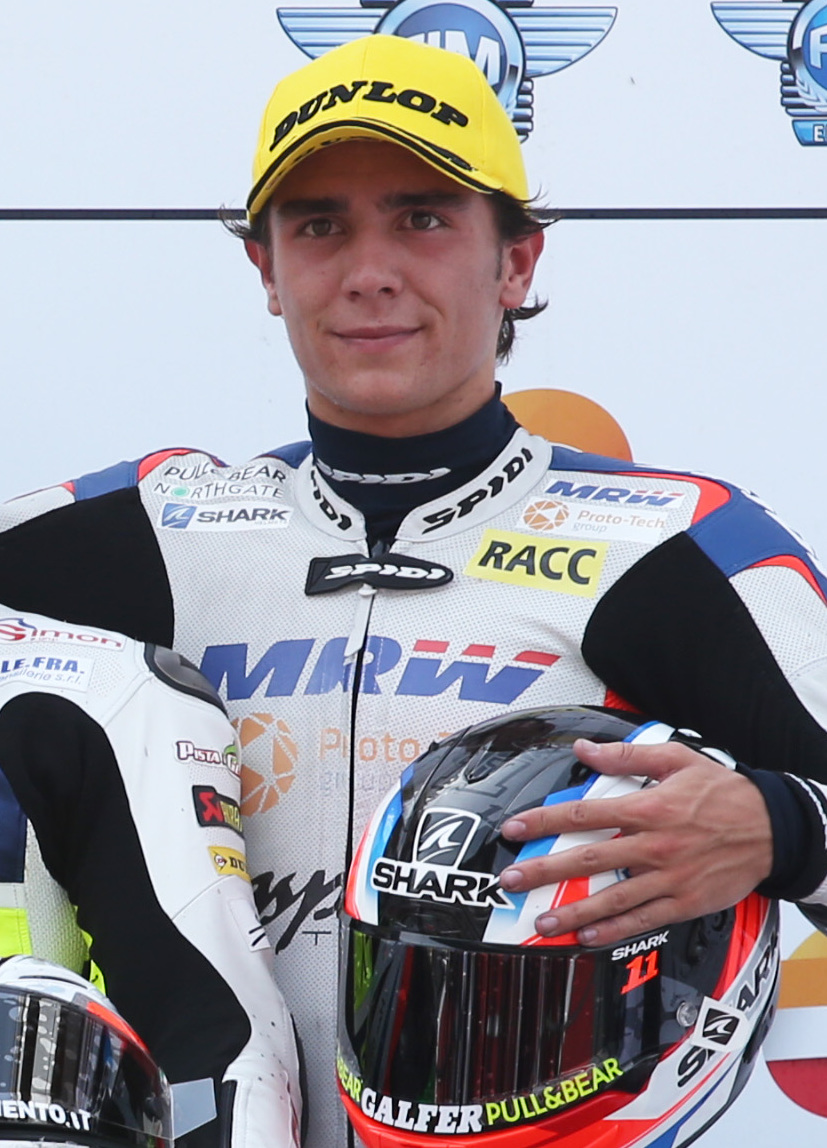
- Arenas in 2016
- Nationality: Spanish
- Born: 11 December 1996 (age 29); Girona, Spain
- Current team: AS Racing Team
- Bike number: 75
Motorcycle racing career statistics
Moto2 World Championship
Active years	2021–2025
Manufacturers	Boscoscuro (2021); Kalex (2022–2025)
2025 championship position	8th (156 pts)
Starts / Wins / Podiums / Poles / F. laps / Points; 97 / 0 / 2 / 0 / 1 / 439
Moto3 World Championship
Active years	2014, 2016–2020
Manufacturers	KTM (2014, 2018–2020); Mahindra (2016–2017); Peugeot (2016)
Championships	1 (2020)
2020 championship position	1st (174 pts)
Starts / Wins / Podiums / Poles / F. laps / Points; 73 / 6 / 10 / 0 / 1 / 405
Supersport World Championship
Active years	2026–
Manufacturers	Yamaha
Championships	1 (2026)
Starts / Wins / Podiums / Poles / F. laps / Points; 24 / 4 / 17 / 3 / 3 / 389

Albert Arenas Ovejero (born 11 December 1996) is a Spanish motorcycle racer who last competed in the 2026 Supersport World Championship with AS Racing Team aboard a Yamaha. Arenas is well known for winning the 2020 Moto3 World Championship and the 2026 Supersport World Championship, becoming the oldest Moto3 World Champion aged 23 years and 347 days.

== Career ==
=== Moto3 World Championship ===
Arenas debuted in the Moto3 World Championship in the last race of the 2014 season in Valencia, as he was signed by Calvo Team to replace the injured Eric Granado. In 2015, he was the FIM CEV Moto3 Junior World Championship runner-up.

==== Aspar Team (2016) ====
In the 2016 Moto3 season, Arenas first made three appearances with the Aspar Team, two as a wild card entry and one as the substitute for the injured Jorge Martín,

==== Peugeot MC Saxoprint (2016) ====
In 2016, Arenas later joined the Peugeot MC Saxoprint team as the permanent replacement for Alexis Masbou.

==== Aspar Team (2017–2020) ====
In 2020, Arenas finished the 2020 Moto3 World Championship season as the world champion, taking 174 points with three wins and five podiums, edging out both Tony Arbolino and Ai Ogura by four points.

=== Moto2 World Championship ===
==== Aspar Team (2021–2022) ====
Arenas joined the Aspar Moto2 team in the 2021 season. It was a relatively weak season for Arenas, spending most of it getting up to grips with the bike, scoring only 28 points in 18 races, and finishing 21st in the standings. The 2022 season was better, as Arenas collected 90 points, finishing 12th in the standings, with his season best result a fourth place from Rimini.

==== Red Bull KTM Ajo (2023) ====
Earning a ride at a top team, Arenas competed for the Red Bull KTM Ajo Moto2 team in the 2023 season. Arenas went on to finish the season 14th in the standings, collecting 85 points, and a season's best third place in Catalonia, his first podium in the intermediate class. His teammate Pedro Acosta won the title by a comfortable margin, 83 points.

==== Gresini Racing Moto2 (2024-2025) ====
Arenas officially joined Gresini Racing Moto2 for the 2024 Moto2 season, where he was paired with teammate Manuel González.

==== AS BLU CRU Racing Team (2026) ====
On November 10, 2025, it was announced that Arenas would leave the Moto2 World Championship paddock and join AS BLU CRU Yamaha for the 2026 Supersport World Championship alongside teammate Aldi Satya Mahendra. Arenas would win the championship in his first season by 81 points over Frenchman Valentin Debise, scoring 389 points over the 24 race season. He also won four races and scored 17 podiums as well as three pole positions and three fastest laps.

== Personal life ==
Between 2022 and 2023, Arenas was in a relationship with Victoria de Marichalar y Borbón, granddaughter of King Juan Carlos I and Queen Sofía of Spain.

== Career statistics ==
=== CEV Buckler Moto3 Championship ===
==== Races by year ====
(key) (Races in bold indicate pole position, races in italics indicate fastest lap)

Year	Bike	1	2	3	4	5	6	7	8	9	Pos	Pts
2012	Honda	JER; Ret	NAV; Ret	ARA; 12	CAT; 9	ALB1; Ret	**ALB2**; 3	VAL; Ret			16th	27
2013	FTR Honda	CAT1; Ret	CAT2; Ret	ARA; 8	ALB1; 1	ALB2; Ret	NAV; Ret	VAL1; 23	VAL1; 14	JER; 9	10th	42

=== FIM CEV Moto3 Junior World Championship ===
==== Races by year ====
(key) (Races in bold indicate pole position, races in italics indicate fastest lap)

Year	Bike	1	2	3	4	5	6	7	8	9	10	11	12	Pos	Pts
2014	Mahindra	JER1; 7	JER2; 8	LMS; 8	ARA	CAT1	CAT2	ALB	NAV; DNS					10th	54
2014	Ioda									ALG	VAL1; 3	VAL1; 4		10th	54
2015	Husqvarna	ALG; 5	LMS; Ret	CAT1; 4	CAT2; 5	ARA1; 6	ARA2; 3	ALB; 3	NAV; 4	JER1; 1	JER2; 2	VAL1; 1	VAL2; 1	2nd	185
2016	Mahindra	VAL1; 8	VAL2; 8	LMS; 11	ARA; 15	CAT1; 5	CAT2; 3	ALB; 7	ALG	JER1; 8	JER2; DNS	VAL1; 4	VAL2; Ret	8th	79

=== Grand Prix motorcycle racing ===
==== By season ====
Season	Class	Motorcycle	Team	Race	Win	Podium	Pole	FLap	Pts	Plcd
2014	Moto3	KTM	Calvo Team	1	0	0	0	0	0	NC
2016	Moto3	Mahindra	Aspar Team	3	0	0	0	0	2	35th
2016	Moto3	Peugeot	Peugeot MC Saxoprint	9	0	0	0	0	2	35th
2017	Moto3	Mahindra	Aspar Team	12	0	0	0	0	14	26th
2018	Moto3	KTM	Aspar Team	17	2	2	0	0	107	9th
2019	Moto3	KTM	Aspar Team	17	1	3	0	0	108	11th
2020	Moto3	KTM	Aspar Team	14	3	5	0	1	174	**1st**
2021	Moto2	Boscoscuro	Aspar Team	18	0	0	0	0	28	21st
2022	Moto2	Kalex	GasGas Aspar Team	20	0	0	0	0	90	12th
2023	Moto2	Kalex	Red Bull KTM Ajo	18	0	1	0	0	85	14th
2024	Moto2	Kalex	QJmotor Gresini Moto2	19	0	0	0	0	80	14th
2025	Moto2	Kalex	Italjet Gresini Moto2	22	0	1	0	1	156	8th
Total				**170**	**6**	**12**	**0**	**2**	**844**	

==== By class ====
Class	Seasons	1st GP	1st pod	1st win	Race	Win	Podiums	Pole	FLap	Pts	WChmp
Moto3	2014, 2016–2020	2014 Valencia	2018 France	2018 France	73	6	10	0	1	405	1
Moto2	2021–2025	2021 Qatar	2023 Catalonia		97	0	2	0	1	439	0
Total	2014, 2016–2025				**170**	**6**	**12**	**0**	**2**	**844**	**1**

==== Races by year ====
(key) (Races in bold indicate pole position, races in italics indicate fastest lap)

Year	Class	Bike	1	2	3	4	5	6	7	8	9	10	11	12	13	14	15	16	17	18	19	20	21	22	Pos	Pts
2014	Moto3	KTM	QAT	AME	ARG	SPA	FRA	ITA	CAT	NED	GER	IND	CZE	GBR	RSM	ARA	JPN	AUS	MAL	VAL; 28					NC	0
2016	Moto3	Mahindra	QAT	ARG	AME	SPA; 18	FRA	ITA	CAT; Ret	NED; Ret	GER														35th	2
2016	Moto3	Peugeot										AUT; 22	CZE; Ret	GBR; Ret	RSM; 19	ARA; 24	JPN; 14	AUS; 16	MAL; Ret	VAL; 24					35th	2
2017	Moto3	Mahindra	QAT; Ret	ARG; 25	AME; 21	SPA; 14	FRA; Ret	ITA; Ret	CAT	NED	GER	CZE; 12	AUT; Ret	GBR; 27	RSM; 8	ARA; 27	JPN; DNS	AUS	MAL	VAL; 23					26th	14
2018	Moto3	KTM	QAT; DNS	ARG; Ret	AME; 15	SPA; Ret	FRA; 1	ITA; 14	CAT; Ret	NED; 14	GER; Ret	CZE; 9	AUT; 4	GBR; C	RSM; 6	ARA; 7	THA; Ret	JPN; Ret	AUS; 1	MAL; 4	VAL; Ret				9th	107
2019	Moto3	KTM	QAT; 6	ARG	AME	SPA; 5	FRA; 11	ITA; 12	CAT; Ret	NED; Ret	GER; 21	CZE; Ret	AUT; 11	GBR; Ret	RSM; Ret	ARA; 8	THA; 1	JPN; 2	AUS; 3	MAL; 12	VAL; 20				11th	108
2020	Moto3	KTM	QAT; 1	SPA; 1	ANC; Ret	CZE; 2	AUT; 1	STY; 5	RSM; Ret	EMI; 4	CAT; Ret	FRA; 3	ARA; 7	TER; 4	EUR; DSQ	VAL; 4	POR; 12								1st	174
2021	Moto2	Boscoscuro	QAT; 21	DOH; 15	POR; 13	SPA; Ret	FRA; 14	ITA; Ret	CAT; 12	GER; 8	NED; 12	STY; 15	AUT; Ret	GBR; 19	ARA; Ret	RSM; 22	AME; Ret	EMI; 11	ALR; Ret	VAL; 22					21st	28
2022	Moto2	Kalex	QAT; 13	INA; 10	ARG; 8	AME; 11	POR; Ret	SPA; 9	FRA; 19	ITA; 10	CAT; Ret	GER; 6	NED; Ret	GBR; Ret	AUT; 9	RSM; 4	ARA; Ret	JPN; 8	THA; 14^{‡}	AUS; 14	MAL; 13	VAL; 5			12th	90
2023	Moto2	Kalex	POR; 8	ARG; 9	AME; 12	SPA; 8	FRA; DNS	ITA; 23	GER; 9	NED; 9	GBR; 14	AUT; Ret	CAT; 3	RSM; DNS	IND; 14	JPN; 18	INA; 15	AUS; 14^{‡}	THA; 7	MAL; 9	QAT; 21	VAL; 10			14th	85
2024	Moto2	Kalex	QAT; 8	POR; 8	AME; 12	SPA; 5	FRA; 9	CAT; 6	ITA; 19	NED; Ret	GER; 21	GBR; 8	AUT; 17	CAT; 18	RSM; 9	EMI; 17	INA; 14	JPN; 22	AUS; 13	THA; 8	MAL; 12	SLD; DSQ			14th	80
2025	Moto2	Kalex	THA; 11	ARG; 10	AME; 24	QAT; 9	SPA; 6	FRA; 6	GBR; 12	ARA; 12	ITA; 2	NED; 7	GER; Ret	CZE; 10	AUT; 4	HUN; 14	CAT; 16	RSM; 11	JPN; 9	INA; 5	AUS; 8	MAL; 6	POR; 8	VAL; 5	8th	156

^{‡} Half points awarded as less than two thirds (2022 Thailand GP)/less than half (2023 Australian GP) of the race distance (but at least three full laps) was completed.

=== Supersport World Championship ===
==== By year ====
(key) (Races in bold indicate pole position; races in italics indicate fastest lap)

Year	Bike	1		2		3		4		5		6		7		8		9		10		11		12		Pos	Pts
Year	Bike	R1	R2	R1	R2	R1	R2	R1	R2	R1	R2	R1	R2	R1	R2	R1	R2	R1	R2	R1	R2	R1	R2	R1	R2	Pos	Pts
2026	Yamaha	AUS; 4	AUS; 1	POR; 5	POR; 3	NED; 2	NED; 2	**HUN**; 2	**HUN**; 1	CZE; 3	CZE; Ret	ARA; 2	ARA; 2	EMI; 2	EMI; 1	GBR; 2	GBR; 2	**FRA**; Ret	**FRA**; 2	ITA; 2	ITA; 2	EST; 4	EST; Ret	**SPA**; 1	**SPA**; Ret	1st	389

=== Suzuka 8 Hours results ===
Year	Team	Riders	Bike	Pos	Ref
2024	(Japan) Yoshimura SERT Motul	(Japan) Cocoro Atsumi (United Kingdom) Dan Linfoot	Suzuki GSX-R 1000	3rd	
2025	(Japan) Team Suzuki CN Challenge	(Spain) Albert Arenas (Japan) Takuya Tsuda (France) Etienne Masson	Suzuki GSX-R 1000	33rd	
