= Zhang Xue (entrepreneur) =

Chinese entrepreneur

- 张雪
- Zhang in 2026
- Born: 1987 (age 38–39); Mayang Miao Autonomous County, Huaihua, Hunan, China
- Known for: Founder of ZXMOTO

Chinese name
- Simplified Chinese: 张雪
- Traditional Chinese: 張雪
Transcriptions
Standard Mandarin
- Hanyu Pinyin: Zhāng Xuě

Zhang Xue (Chinese: 张雪; born 1987) is a Chinese entrepreneur and founder of ZXMOTO (Chongqing Zhangxue Motorcycle Industry Co., Ltd.).

== Early life ==
Zhang Xue was born in 1987 in Mayang Miao Autonomous County, Huaihua, Hunan, China. He developed an interest in motorcycles at an early age.

After graduating from junior high school, Zhang worked as an apprentice mechanic at a motorcycle repair shop, where he learned maintenance and technical skills.

In October 2026, Zhang Xue publicly stated that he had blocked his mother's phone number, cutting off contact with her after she gave multiple media interviews following his championship win.

== Early career ==
In the mid-2000s, Zhang operated a small motorcycle workshop in his hometown.

In 2006, Zhang contacted Hunan Television in an attempt to appear on a program showcasing motorcycle skills. According to reports, he later followed a television production crew on a motorcycle for three hours to request a second filming opportunity.

In 2007, his story was broadcast on a program on Hunan Television, which brought him initial public attention and helped him secure a position with a motorcycle team.

In April 2007, Zhang joined a motorcycle team based in Siyang County, Jiangsu, where he worked as a stunt rider and mechanic, and received informal training from professional rider Zhang Jixing.

== Industry career ==
In 2009, Zhang joined Zhejiang Apollo Motorcycle Co., Ltd., where he was involved in product development and also participated in off-road racing activities.

In 2013, Zhang moved to Chongqing, a major hub of China's motorcycle industry, where he began assembling motorcycles and later joined a local manufacturer. He participated in the development of models including the Huanghe Free 250X and 300X.

In 2016, he founded Chongqing Ziyou Motorcycle Sales Co., Ltd., which was later dissolved.

In 2017, Zhang co-founded Kove Moto (Tibet Kove Industry Co., Ltd.) with Liao Tao and Wen Famo, serving as general manager and a major individual shareholder.

In March 2024, Zhang left Kove Moto. In April 2024, he founded ZXMOTO (Chongqing Zhangxue Motorcycle Industry Co., Ltd.).

== Motorsport involvement ==
ZXMOTO entered the Supersport World Championship in 2026. At the Portuguese round of the season, rider Valentin Debise secured two race victories for the ZXMOTO Factory Evan Bros Racing team.

On April 10, 2026, a replica of a championship-winning racing car and a championship trophy were sold at a public auction via live stream, fetching 5 million RMB in just 45 seconds. The entirety of the proceeds was donated to the Smile Angel Foundation to support the Beijing Smile Angel Children's Hospital. This charitable event has garnered widespread public attention due to the involvement of entrepreneur Chen Guangbiao's 'car donation' and the unprecedented speed of the transaction."
