= 2026 New Zealand Motocross Championship =

New Zealand Motocross Competition in 2026

The 2026 New Zealand Motocross Championship season, known for sponsorship reasons as the Yamaha New Zealand Motocross Championship, was the 52nd New Zealand Motocross Championship season.

The series consisted of four rounds across the country, running from November 2025 to late February 2026. Unlike in the previous season, the championship began prior to the new year and had an equal share of rounds between North Island and South Island.

Maximus Purvis was the reigning champion in the MX1 class, after picking up his fourth national title in the 2025 season. Purvis successfully defended his title, taking a clean sweep of overall victories and winning all but one race throughout the season.

In the MX2 class, Madoc Dixon was the reigning champion, after picking up his first senior national title in the previous season. Hayden Draper won two of the four rounds held and picked up his first senior national title in the MX2 class.

== Race calendar and results ==
=== MX1 ===
Round	Date	Location	Race 1 Winner	Race 2 Winner	Race 3 Winner	Round Winner
1	16 November 2025	Invercargill	(New Zealand) Maximus Purvis	(New Zealand) Maximus Purvis	(New Zealand) Maximus Purvis	(New Zealand) Maximus Purvis
2	22 November 2025	Balclutha	(New Zealand) Maximus Purvis	(New Zealand) Maximus Purvis	(New Zealand) Maximus Purvis	(New Zealand) Maximus Purvis
3	21 February	Tauranga	(New Zealand) Maximus Purvis	(New Zealand) Maximus Purvis	(New Zealand) Maximus Purvis	(New Zealand) Maximus Purvis
4	28 February	Rotorua	(Australia) Kyle Webster	(New Zealand) Maximus Purvis	(New Zealand) Maximus Purvis	(New Zealand) Maximus Purvis

=== MX2 ===
Round	Date	Location	Race 1 Winner	Race 2 Winner	Race 3 Winner	Round Winner
1	16 November 2025	Invercargill	(New Zealand) Hayden Draper	(Australia) Caleb Ward	(New Zealand) Hayden Draper	(New Zealand) Hayden Draper
2	22 November 2025	Balclutha	(New Zealand) Hayden Draper	(Australia) Caleb Ward	(Australia) Caleb Ward	(Australia) Caleb Ward
3	21 February	Tauranga	(Australia) Caleb Ward	(New Zealand) Flynn Watts	(New Zealand) Hayden Draper	(New Zealand) Hayden Draper
4	28 February	Rotorua	(New Zealand) Hayden Draper	(New Zealand) James Scott	(New Zealand) James Scott	(New Zealand) James Scott

=== Circuit locations ===
2026 New Zealand Motocross Championship locations

== MX1 ==
=== Participants ===
Team	Constructor	No	Rider	Rounds
Motorcycles 'R Us/Kustom MX	KTM	F	(Australia) Ryley Fitzpatrick	1–2
LMC Husqvarna	Husqvarna	F	(Australia) Ryley Fitzpatrick	3–4
LMC Husqvarna	Husqvarna	11	(New Zealand) Seth Thompson	1–2
Yamaha Moto Company/Yamaha NZ	Yamaha	K	(Japan) Kainosuke Oshiro	3–4
Quadlock Honda Racing	Honda	W	(Australia) Kyle Webster	3–4
Brent Scammell Honda Race Team	Honda	5	(New Zealand) Jack Symon	All
Brent Scammell Honda Race Team	Honda	58	(New Zealand) Ryan Harris	1–2
Pumps & Filters	Yamaha	24	(New Zealand) Liam Hutton	All
Degree Building/CML Racing	Gas Gas	24	(New Zealand) Cooper Smith	All
Honda Motul Racing New Zealand	Honda	30	(New Zealand) Josiah Natzke	All
Altherm JCR Yamaha	Yamaha	44	(New Zealand) Maximus Purvis	All
Kawasaki New Zealand/Marlborough Motorcycles	Kawasaki	48	(New Zealand) Nick D'Arcy	All
Yamaha NZ/bLU cRU/Yamalube	Yamaha	57	(New Zealand) Josh Jack	3–4
Mahana Earthworks	Yamaha	81	(New Zealand) Hayden Wilkinson	1
CML KTM Racing	KTM	93	(New Zealand) Jack Treloar	All
MTF Finance Richmond/Impact Physio	Yamaha	115	(New Zealand) Liam Kerr	1–2
Oamaru Honda	Honda	139	(New Zealand) Campbell King	1–2
Team MR Moto	KTM	144	(New Zealand) Tyler Brown	1–2
Team MR Moto	Yamaha	809	(New Zealand) Tyler Cooksley	All
Chris Parnwell Motorcycles	Yamaha	267	(New Zealand) Mitch Parnwell	1–2
Sabel Cafe/Stihl Shop Hamilton East	Husqvarna	336	(New Zealand) Joel Hansen	4
AFC/Winiata Contracting/Heights Experience	KTM	393	(New Zealand) Toby Winiata	3–4
Whites Powersports NZ/Kawasaki NZ	Kawasaki	394	(New Zealand) Richard Horne	3–4
Max Winders Shearing	Honda	650	(New Zealand) Max Winders	All
MR Motorcycles/Alpinestars/Yamaha NZ	Yamaha	717	(New Zealand) Jayden McKenzie	All
	KTM	746	(New Zealand) Rhys Johnstone	3–4
Moto1/NMC/Harris Farms	KTM	888	(New Zealand) Dylan Huddleston	2
Promoto	Yamaha	929	(New Zealand) Tyler Steiner	3–4
Bike Torque Taumaranui	Gas Gas	931	(New Zealand) Alex Maitland	3–4
Blackwood Yamaha	Yamaha	972	(New Zealand) Carlin Hedley	3–4

=== Riders Championship ===
Points are awarded to finishers of the main races, in the following format:

Position	1st	2nd	3rd	4th	5th	6th	7th	8th	9th	10th	11th	12th	13th	14th	15th	16th	17th	18th	19th	20th
Points	25	22	20	18	16	15	14	13	12	11	10	9	8	7	6	5	4	3	2	1

Pos	Rider	Bike	INV			BAL			TAU			ROT			Points
1	(New Zealand) Maximus Purvis	Yamaha	1	1	1	1	1	1	1	1	1	2	1	1	297
2	(New Zealand) Josiah Natzke	Honda	2	2	2	2	3	2	3	3	3	4	3	3	248
3	(New Zealand) Jack Symon	Honda	3	3	5	4	5	4	4	4	4	3	4	5	216
4	(Australia) Ryley Fitzpatrick	KTM	4	5	4	5	4	3							195
4	(Australia) Ryley Fitzpatrick	Husqvarna							6	8	6	6	5	6	195
5	(New Zealand) Jack Treloar	KTM	Ret	4	3	3	2	5	5	7	5	5	Ret	4	176
6	(New Zealand) Nic D'Arcy	Kawasaki	6	8	8	7	10	9	10	13	9	11	11	12	138
7	(New Zealand) Tyler Cooksley	Yamaha	10	7	7	12	7	7	16	11	10	10	9	10	136
8	(Australia) Kyle Webster	Honda							2	2	2	1	2	2	135
9	(New Zealand) Jayden McKenzie	Yamaha	7	12	9	9	6	6	13	12	13	14	10	13	128
10	(Japan) Kainosuke Oshiro	Yamaha							7	5	7	8	6	7	86
11	(New Zealand) Seth Thompson	Husqvarna	5	6	6	10	9	10							80
12	(New Zealand) Tyler Steiner	Yamaha							8	6	8	7	Ret	8	68
13	(New Zealand) Campbell King	Honda	8	Ret	11	6	8	8							64
14	(New Zealand) Ryan Harris	Honda	9	10	12	11	11	11							62
15	(New Zealand) Carlin Hedley	Yamaha							14	14	11	9	8	9	61
16	(New Zealand) Alex Maitland	Gas Gas							9	10	12	15	12	11	57
17	(New Zealand) Liam Hutton	Yamaha	15	15	16	16	15	16	20	19	18	18	14	15	55
18	(New Zealand) Cooper Smith	Gas Gas	16	11	13	Ret	12	12	17	18	16	Ret	DNS	DNS	53
19	(New Zealand) Toby Winiata	KTM							11	15	14	12	7	14	53
20	(New Zealand) Max Winders	Honda	17	DNS	14	14	17	17	18	17	17	17	17	16	50
21	(New Zealand) Tyler Brown	KTM	12	9	10	8	Ret	DNS							45
22	(New Zealand) Liam Kerr	Yamaha	13	13	17	13	14	15							41
23	(New Zealand) Mitch Parnwell	Yamaha	14	14	15	17	16	14							36
24	(New Zealand) Josh Jack	Yamaha							12	9	15	DNS	DNS	DNS	27
25	(New Zealand) Richard Horne	Kawasaki							15	16	Ret	13	13	Ret	27
26	(New Zealand) Dylan Huddleston	KTM				15	13	13							22
27	(New Zealand) Joel Hansen	Husqvarna										16	15	17	15
28	(New Zealand) Rhys Johnstone	KTM							19	Ret	DNS	19	16	18	12
29	(New Zealand) Hayden Wilkinson	Yamaha	11	Ret	DNS										10
Pos	Rider	Bike	INV			BAL			TAU			ROT			Points

== MX2 ==
=== Participants ===
Team	Constructor	No	Rider	Rounds
Yamaha Motor Company/Yamaha NZ	Yamaha	A	(Japan) Aoi Takagi	3–4
Yamaha Motor Company/Yamaha NZ	Yamaha	J	(Japan) Junya Tanaka	3–4
KTM Australia	KTM	T	(Australia) Taylor Thompson	1–2
Kawasaki New Zealand	Kawasaki	1	(New Zealand) Madoc Dixon	All
Kawasaki New Zealand	Kawasaki	29	(New Zealand) Maz Parkes	All
Norjo Motorcycles/East Coast Powersports	Kawasaki	17	(New Zealand) Bradley Hamburger	1–2
Team MR Moto	Yamaha	22	(New Zealand) Flynn Watts	3–4
Team MR Moto	KTM	999	(New Zealand) Jared Hannon	All
Moto 1 Motorcycles	Honda	23	(Australia) Corey Eisel	3–4
Kawasaki New Zealand/Powerzone Motorcycles	Kawasaki	25	(New Zealand) Connor Bond	1, 4
LMC Husqvarna	Husqvarna	26	(New Zealand) Mitch Weir	All
LMC Husqvarna	Husqvarna	192	(New Zealand) Reuben Smith	3–4
LMC Husqvarna	Husqvarna	517	(United Kingdom) Alexander Brown	1–3
Alpinestars Best Build Racing	Honda	41	(New Zealand) Curtis King	All
Alpinestars Best Build Racing	Honda	110	(New Zealand) Rian King	All
Honda Racing Motul New Zealand	Honda	66	(New Zealand) Jack Ellingham	All
Action Moto	Kawasaki	88	(New Zealand) Finn Lennox	3
Altherm JCR Yamaha	Yamaha	96	(New Zealand) Hayden Draper	All
Altherm JCR Yamaha	Yamaha	108	(New Zealand) James Scott	All
Mr Motorcycles/SDM Mechanical	KTM	103	(New Zealand) Delton Manson	3
Pumpn/Boyds Motorcycles	KTM	112	(New Zealand) Cooper Phillips	All
CML Gas Gas	Gas Gas	121	(New Zealand) Cody Cooper	All
CML Gas Gas	Gas Gas	486	(New Zealand) Ryan Hayward	All
Josh Coppins Motorcycles	Yamaha	122	(New Zealand) Wills Harvey	1–3
Timaru Honda/Central Feeds	Honda	152	(New Zealand) Riley Caird	1–2
Nelson Motorcycles/KTM NZ	KTM	199	(New Zealand) Alex Garland	All
Brent Scammell Honda Race Team	Honda	222	(New Zealand) Michael Buchanan	1–2
Rae Emerson Motorsport	KTM	278	(New Zealand) Yanni Emerson-Rae	All
Yamaha Motor NZ	Yamaha	309	(New Zealand) Nixon Parkes	3–4
Craig Stevens Motorcycles	Yamaha	321	(New Zealand) Cody Griffiths	All
Nelson Motorcycles/Nelson Brake Services	KTM	433	(New Zealand) Luke Heaphy	All
CML KTM Racing	KTM	485	(Australia) Caleb Ward	All
Kawasaki NZ/Team Green	Kawasaki	488	(New Zealand) Riley Soutar	1–2
	Kawasaki	733	(New Zealand) Ashton Whyte	1–2
MAKZ Gear/FXR/LM Surfacing	KTM	758	(New Zealand) Ethan Raynel	All
Flying W Suspension	Yamaha	929	(New Zealand) Tyler Steiner	1–2
Fabtech Engineering Solutions	Yamaha	947	(New Zealand) Kolby Brooklan	1–2

=== Riders Championship ===
Points are awarded to finishers of the main races, in the following format:

Position	1st	2nd	3rd	4th	5th	6th	7th	8th	9th	10th	11th	12th	13th	14th	15th	16th	17th	18th	19th	20th
Points	25	22	20	18	16	15	14	13	12	11	10	9	8	7	6	5	4	3	2	1

Pos	Rider	Bike	INV			BAL			TAU			ROT			Points
1	(New Zealand) Hayden Draper	Yamaha	1	5	1	1	4	9	5	2	1	1	2	2	253
2	(New Zealand) James Scott	Yamaha	2	2	3	8	3	3	2	7	3	2	1	1	245
3	(Australia) Caleb Ward	KTM	13	1	4	3	1	1	1	4	4	3	10	5	229
4	(New Zealand) Madoc Dixon	Kawasaki	28	8	9	2	7	Ret	6	3	2	6	5	4	167
5	(New Zealand) Rian King	Honda	7	10	8	6	9	7	7	6	5	15	6	3	165
6	(New Zealand) Jack Ellingham	Honda	6	4	12	10	2	6	10	5	14	7	22	13	146
7	(New Zealand) Cody Griffiths	Yamaha	5	9	13	9	13	5	20	10	10	5	4	9	141
8	(New Zealand) Jared Hannon	KTM	8	7	5	14	14	10	12	11	13	11	9	6	132
9	(New Zealand) Cody Cooper	Gas Gas	15	6	7	5	8	4	18	8	19	4	Ret	DNS	118
10	(New Zealand) Cooper Phillips	KTM	10	14	15	11	17	11	9	9	11	9	8	11	117
11	(United Kingdom) Alexander Brown	Husqvarna	3	3	2	7	5	2	DNS	DNS	DNS				114
12	(New Zealand) Maz Parkes	Kawasaki	14	17	14	4	10	13	4	12	12	12	7	Ret	114
13	(New Zealand) Mitch Weir	Husqvarna	4	12	10	15	12	12	15	15	16	14	12	10	106
14	(New Zealand) Luke Heaphy	KTM	12	11	11	12	11	8	19	17	15	18	11	14	93
15	(New Zealand) Flynn Watts	Yamaha							3	1	8	10	3	Ret	89
16	(New Zealand) Ryan Hayward	Gas Gas	16	15	19	18	18	15	14	14	9	16	15	12	71
17	(New Zealand) Reuben Smith	Husqvarna							13	13	6	8	14	7	65
18	(New Zealand) Curtis King	Honda	11	19	17	13	15	14	16	16	17	22	16	15	62
19	(New Zealand) Wills Harvey	Yamaha	9	13	6	16	6	25	DNS	DNS	DNS				55
20	(Japan) Junya Tanaka	Yamaha							11	Ret	7	13	13	8	53
21	(New Zealand) Alex Garland	KTM	17	18	16	17	19	16	23	22	20	19	20	17	31
22	(New Zealand) Tyler Steiner	Yamaha	18	16	18	Ret	16	Ret							16
23	(Australia) Corey Eisel	Honda							17	18	Ret	20	18	18	14
24	(New Zealand) Ethan Raynel	KTM	25	25	20	21	21	17	22	19	18	Ret	19	19	14
25	(New Zealand) Delton Manson	KTM							8	Ret	DNS				13
26	(New Zealand) Nixon Parkes	Yamaha							21	DNS	DNS	17	17	16	13
27	(Australia) Taylor Thompson	KTM	20	21	25	19	20	19							6
28	(New Zealand) Yanni Emerson-Rae	KTM	22	22	23	24	23	18	26	21	21	21	21	20	4
29	(New Zealand) Kolby Brookland	Yamaha	Ret	20	21	20	22	20							3
30	(New Zealand) Connor Bond	Kawasaki	19	Ret	DNS							Ret	DNS	DNS	2
31	(Japan) Aoi Takagi	Yamaha							24	20	22	23	23	21	1
	(New Zealand) Michael Buchanan	Honda	23	23	22	22	25	21							0
	(New Zealand) Ashton Whyte	Kawasaki	21	24	24	23	DNS	DNS							0
	(New Zealand) Riley Caird	Honda	24	26	26	25	24	22							0
	(New Zealand) Riley Soutar	Kawasaki	27	28	28	26	27	23							0
	(New Zealand) Bradley Hamburger	Kawasaki	26	27	27	27	26	24							0
	(New Zealand) Finn Lennox	Kawasaki							25	Ret	DNS				0
Pos	Rider	Bike	INV			BAL			TAU			ROT			Points
