= 2026 Supersport World Championship =

Motorsport championship

2026 Supersport World Championship
Previous:	2025	Next:	2027
Support series: Superbike World Championship; Sportbike World Championship; Women’s Circuit Racing World Championship; Yamaha R3 bLU cRU FIM World Cup

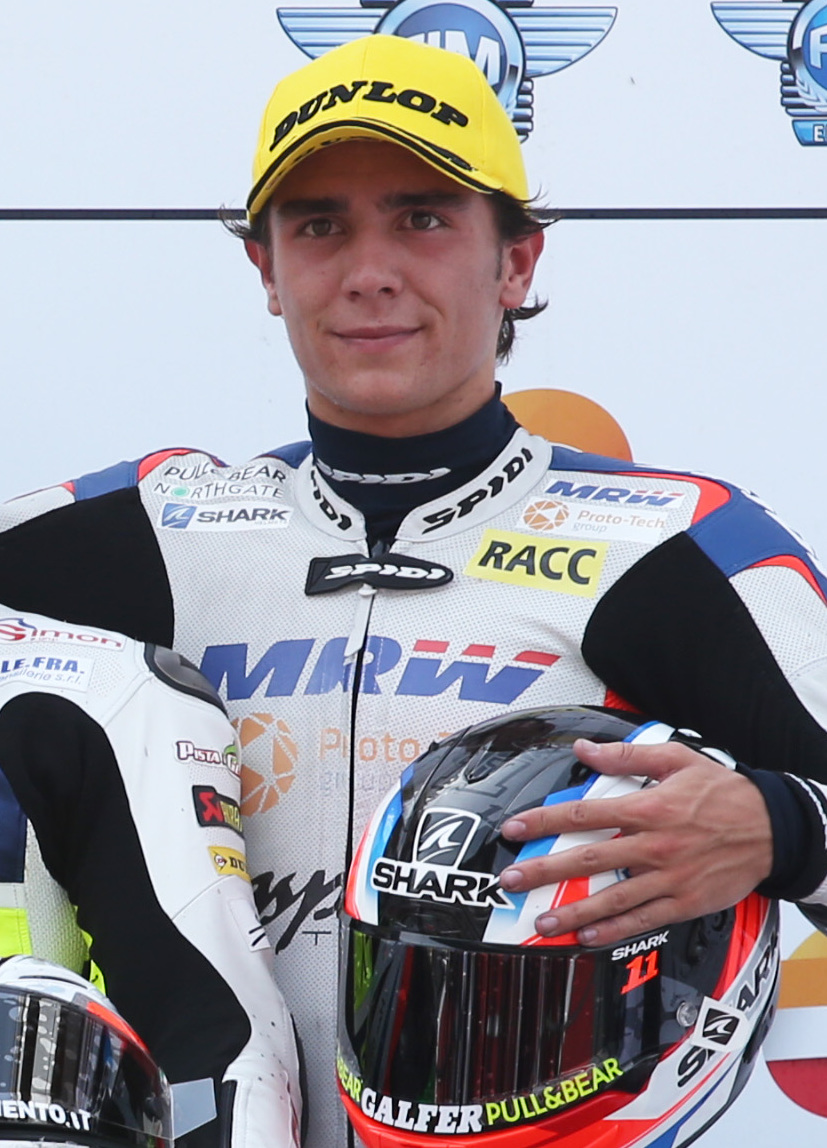
Albert Arenas (pictured in 2016) was the 2026 Supersport World Champion

The 2026 Supersport World Championship was part of the 39th season of the Superbike World Championship, and the 30th season of the Supersport World Championship class.

Spanish rider Albert Arenas won the Riders' championship in race 1 of the penultimate round at Estoril. AS bLU cRU Racing Team, the team which fielded Arenas won the Teams' championship, with Yamaha winning the Manufacturers' championship.

== Entry list ==
2026 entry list
Team	Constructor	Motorcycle	No.	Rider	Class	Rounds
(Italy) Broncos Racing Team	Ducati	Panigale V2	21	(Italy) Kevin Zannoni		7
(Italy) D34G WorldSSP Racing Team	Ducati	Panigale V2	40	(Italy) Mattia Casadei		All
(Netherlands) EAB Racing Team	Ducati	Panigale V2	43	(Denmark) Simon Jespersen		All
(Italy) Ecosantagata Althea Racing Team	Ducati	Panigale V2	10	(Italy) Leonardo Taccini		All
(Italy) Ecosantagata Althea Racing Team	Ducati	Panigale V2	16	(Italy) Alessandro Zaccone		All
(Italy) Feel Racing WorldSSP Team	Ducati	Panigale V2	65	(Germany) Philipp Öttl		All
(Spain) I+Dent Racing Team	Ducati	Panigale V2	41	(Turkey) Kadir Erbay		6
(Spain) Orelac Racing Verdnatura	Ducati	Panigale V2	5	(Spain) Jaume Masià		All
(Spain) Orelac Racing Verdnatura	Ducati	Panigale V2	70	(United Kingdom) Joshua Whatley		All
(Italy) Renzi Corse	Ducati	Panigale V2	28	(Spain) Marco Tapia		12
(Italy) Renzi Corse	Ducati	Panigale V2	44	(Spain) Héctor Garzó		7–11
(Italy) Renzi Corse	Ducati	Panigale V2	54	(Italy) Riccardo Rossi		1–6
(United Kingdom) Scars–Racing	Ducati	Panigale V2	81	(United Kingdom) Luke Stapleford		8
(Czech Republic) WRP Racing	Ducati	Panigale V2	11	(Italy) Matteo Ferrari		All
(Czech Republic) WRP Racing	Ducati	Panigale V2	91	(Spain) Borja Jiménez		All
(France) Honda Racing WorldSSP Team	Honda	CBR600RR	4	(Republic of Ireland) Jack Kennedy	C	3
(France) Honda Racing WorldSSP Team	Honda	CBR600RR	6	(France) Corentin Perolari	C	2, 4–12
(France) Honda Racing WorldSSP Team	Honda	CBR600RR	22	(Spain) Ana Carrasco	C	2–12
(Portugal) Rosa Competicion/MCL	Honda	CBR600RR	58	(Portugal) Martim Jesus		2
(Italy) Kawasaki WorldSSP Team	Kawasaki	ZX-6R	52	(Spain) Jeremy Alcoba		All
(Italy) Kawasaki WorldSSP Team	Kawasaki	ZX-6R	77	(Switzerland) Dominique Aegerter		All
(Italy) MRT Corse	Kawasaki	ZX-6R	48	(Spain) Julio García		10
(France) Flembbo by Racing Development	MV Agusta	F3 800 RR	23	(France) Samuel Di Sora		9–12
(France) Flembbo by Racing Development	MV Agusta	F3 800 RR	73	(Italy) Jacopo Cretaro		1–8
(Italy) Motozoo by Madforce Dubai	MV Agusta	F3 800 RR	88	(Italy) Andrea Giombini		All
(China) QJMotor Factory Racing	QJ Motor	SRK 800 RS	3	(Italy) Raffaele De Rosa	C	3–12
(China) QJMotor Factory Racing	QJ Motor	SRK 800 RS	24	(Spain) Marcos Ramírez	C	3–9
(China) QJMotor Factory Racing	QJ Motor	SRK 800 RS	99	(Turkey) Bahattin Sofuoğlu	C	10–12
(Czech Republic) Compos Racing Team	Triumph	Street Triple RS 765	25	(Czech Republic) Oliver König		All
(Czech Republic) Compos Racing Team	Triumph	Street Triple RS 765	50	(Czech Republic) Ondřej Vostatek		All
(United Kingdom) PTR Triumph Factory Racing	Triumph	Street Triple RS 765	9	(Spain) Jorge Navarro		9, 12
(United Kingdom) PTR Triumph Factory Racing	Triumph	Street Triple RS 765	32	(Australia) Oli Bayliss		1–8, 10–11
(United Kingdom) PTR Triumph Factory Racing	Triumph	Street Triple RS 765	69	(United Kingdom) Tom Booth-Amos		All
(Italy) AS bLU cRU Racing Team	Yamaha	YZF-R9	57	(Indonesia) Aldi Mahendra		All
(Italy) AS bLU cRU Racing Team	Yamaha	YZF-R9	75	(Spain) Albert Arenas		All
(Spain) Cerba Yamaha Racing Team	Yamaha	YZF-R9	20	(Andorra) Xavier Cardelús		1–7
(Spain) Cerba Yamaha Racing Team	Yamaha	YZF-R9	47	(Spain) Eric Fernández		11–12
(Spain) Cerba Yamaha Racing Team	Yamaha	YZF-R9	54	(Italy) Riccardo Rossi		8, 10
(France) GMT94 Yamaha	Yamaha	YZF-R9	37	(Spain) Roberto García		All
(France) GMT94 Yamaha	Yamaha	YZF-R9	56	(France) Mathieu Gines		9
(France) GMT94 Yamaha	Yamaha	YZF-R9	94	(France) Lucas Mahias		All
(Austria) Motorsport Kofler	Yamaha	YZF-R9	19	(Austria) Andreas Kofler	C	2–12
(Portugal) Motos VR Yamaha Racing Team	Yamaha	YZF-R9	76	(Portugal) Gonçalo Capote		11
(Netherlands) Pata Yamaha Ten Kate Racing	Yamaha	YZF-R9	31	(Japan) Yuki Okamoto		All
(Netherlands) Pata Yamaha Ten Kate Racing	Yamaha	YZF-R9	61	(Turkey) Can Öncü		All
(Netherlands) Team Apreco	Yamaha	YZF-R9	60	(Germany) Dirk Geiger		3
(Italy) VFT Racing Yamaha	Yamaha	YZF-R9	7	(Italy) Filippo Farioli		All
(Italy) Zxmoto Factory Evan Bros Racing	Zxmoto	820RR-RS	53	(France) Valentin Debise		All
(Italy) Zxmoto Factory Evan Bros Racing	Zxmoto	820RR-RS	64	(Italy) Federico Caricasulo		All

Key
Regular rider
Wildcard rider
Replacement rider
C WorldSSP Challenge

== Race calendar and results ==
The provisional 2026 season calendar was announced on 31 July 2025.

2026 calendar
Round			Circuit	Date	Pole position	Fastest lap	Winning rider	Winning team	Winning constructor	Ref
1	R1	(Australia) Australian Round	Phillip Island Grand Prix Circuit	21 February	(Spain) Jaume Masià	(Spain) Jaume Masià	(Spain) Jaume Masià	(Spain) Orelac Racing Verdnatura	(Italy) Ducati	
1	R2	(Australia) Australian Round	Phillip Island Grand Prix Circuit	22 February		(Australia) Oli Bayliss	(Spain) Albert Arenas	(Italy) AS bLU cRU Racing Team	(Japan) Yamaha	
2	R1	(Portugal) Portuguese Round	Algarve International Circuit	28 March	(Turkey) Can Öncü	(France) Valentin Debise	(France) Valentin Debise	(Italy) Zxmoto Factory Evan Bros Racing	(China) Zxmoto	
2	R2	(Portugal) Portuguese Round	Algarve International Circuit	29 March		(France) Lucas Mahias	(France) Valentin Debise	(Italy) Zxmoto Factory Evan Bros Racing	(China) Zxmoto	
3	R1	(Netherlands) Dutch Round	TT Circuit Assen	18 April	(France) Lucas Mahias	(Spain) Albert Arenas	(Spain) Jaume Masià	(Spain) Orelac Racing Verdnatura	(Italy) Ducati	
3	R2	(Netherlands) Dutch Round	TT Circuit Assen	19 April		(United Kingdom) Tom Booth-Amos	(Germany) Philipp Öttl	(Italy) Feel Racing WorldSSP Team	(Italy) Ducati	
4	R1	(Hungary) Hungarian Round	Balaton Park Circuit	2 May	(Spain) Albert Arenas	(Spain) Albert Arenas	(France) Valentin Debise	(Italy) Zxmoto Factory Evan Bros Racing	(China) Zxmoto	
4	R2	(Hungary) Hungarian Round	Balaton Park Circuit	3 May		(Spain) Jaume Masià	(Spain) Albert Arenas	(Italy) AS bLU cRU Racing Team	(Japan) Yamaha	
5	R1	(Czech Republic) Czech Round	Autodrom Most	16 May	(Turkey) Can Öncü	(France) Valentin Debise	(France) Valentin Debise	(Italy) Zxmoto Factory Evan Bros Racing	(China) Zxmoto	
5	R2	(Czech Republic) Czech Round	Autodrom Most	17 May		(Spain) Jaume Masià	(France) Valentin Debise	(Italy) Zxmoto Factory Evan Bros Racing	(China) Zxmoto	
6	R1	(Aragon) Aragón Round	MotorLand Aragón	30 May	(Spain) Albert Arenas	(United Kingdom) Tom Booth-Amos	(Italy) Alessandro Zaccone	(Italy) Ecosantagata Althea Racing Team	(Italy) Ducati	
6	R2	(Aragon) Aragón Round	MotorLand Aragón	31 May		(France) Valentin Debise	(Spain) Jaume Masià	(Spain) Orelac Racing Verdnatura	(Italy) Ducati	
7	R1	Emilia-Romagna Round	Misano World Circuit	13 June	(Turkey) Can Öncü	(France) Valentin Debise	(France) Valentin Debise	(Italy) Zxmoto Factory Evan Bros Racing	(China) Zxmoto	
7	R2	Emilia-Romagna Round	Misano World Circuit	14 June		(Indonesia) Aldi Mahendra	(Spain) Albert Arenas	(Italy) AS bLU cRU Racing Team	(Japan) Yamaha	
8	R1	(United Kingdom) UK Round	Donington Park	11 July	(Turkey) Can Öncü	(United Kingdom) Tom Booth-Amos	(United Kingdom) Tom Booth-Amos	(United Kingdom) PTR Triumph Factory Racing	(United Kingdom) Triumph	
8	R2	(United Kingdom) UK Round	Donington Park	12 July		(France) Valentin Debise	(United Kingdom) Tom Booth-Amos	(United Kingdom) PTR Triumph Factory Racing	(United Kingdom) Triumph	
9	R1	(France) French Round	Circuit de Nevers Magny-Cours	5 September	(France) Valentin Debise	(United Kingdom) Tom Booth-Amos	(Turkey) Can Öncü	(Netherlands) Pata Yamaha Ten Kate Racing	(Japan) Yamaha	
9	R2	(France) French Round	Circuit de Nevers Magny-Cours	6 September		(Spain) Albert Arenas	(Spain) Roberto García	(France) GMT94 Yamaha	(Japan) Yamaha	
10	R1	(Italy) Italian Round	Cremona Circuit	26 September	(Spain) Jeremy Alcoba	(United Kingdom) Tom Booth-Amos	(Spain) Jeremy Alcoba	(Italy) Kawasaki WorldSSP Team	(Japan) Kawasaki	
10	R2	(Italy) Italian Round	Cremona Circuit	27 September		(United Kingdom) Tom Booth-Amos	(Spain) Jeremy Alcoba	(Italy) Kawasaki WorldSSP Team	(Japan) Kawasaki	
11	R1	(Portugal) Estoril Round	Circuito do Estoril	10 October	(Turkey) Can Öncü	(Spain) Roberto García	(United Kingdom) Tom Booth-Amos	(United Kingdom) PTR Triumph Factory Racing	(United Kingdom) Triumph	
11	R2	(Portugal) Estoril Round	Circuito do Estoril	11 October		(France) Valentin Debise	(Spain) Jeremy Alcoba	(Italy) Kawasaki WorldSSP Team	(Japan) Kawasaki	
12	R1	(Spain) Spanish Round	Circuito de Jerez	17 October	(Spain) Albert Arenas	(Spain) Jorge Navarro	(Spain) Albert Arenas	(Italy) AS bLU cRU Racing Team	(Japan) Yamaha	
12	R2	(Spain) Spanish Round	Circuito de Jerez	18 October		(Turkey) Can Öncü	(Spain) Jeremy Alcoba	(Italy) Kawasaki WorldSSP Team	(Japan) Kawasaki	

== Championship standings ==
=== Scoring system ===
Position	**1st**	**2nd**	**3rd**	**4th**	**5th**	**6th**	**7th**	**8th**	**9th**	**10th**	**11th**	**12th**	**13th**	**14th**	**15th**
Points	25	20	16	13	11	10	9	8	7	6	5	4	3	2	1

=== Riders' championship ===
Pos	Rider	Bike	PHI (Australia)		POR (Portugal)		ASS (Netherlands)		BAL (Hungary)		MOS (Czech Republic)		ARA (Spain)		MIS (Emilia-Romagna)		DON (United Kingdom)		MAG (France)		CRE (Italy)		EST (Portugal)		JER (Spain)		Pts
Pos	Rider	Bike	R1	R2	R1	R2	R1	R2	R1	R2	R1	R2	R1	R2	R1	R2	R1	R2	R1	R2	R1	R2	R1	R2	R1	R2	Pts
1	(Spain) Albert Arenas	Yamaha	4	1	5	3	2	**2**	**2**	**1**	3	Ret	**2**	2	2	1	2	2	Ret	2	2	2	4	Ret	**1**	Ret	389
2	(France) Valentin Debise	Zxmoto	25	24	1	**1**	4	7	1	Ret	1	**1**	8	8	1	**9**	8	10	**3**	3	4	5	6	3	10	5	308
3	(Spain) Jeremy Alcoba	Kawasaki	10	9	10	7	9	8	4	7	13	8	11	10	14	5	3	6	15	5	**1**	1	3	1	2	1	274
4	(Turkey) Can Öncü	Yamaha	5	5	**25**	8	10	3	3	2	**2**	2	12	11	**3**	10	**5**	8	1	4	27	11	**21**	4	3	4	263
5	(United Kingdom) Tom Booth-Amos	Triumph	Ret	15	12	12	3	4	7	6	26	16	3	**7**	4	2	1	**1**	25	**Ret**	5	**3**	1	Ret	4	Ret	230
6	(Spain) Jaume Masià	Ducati	**1**	**10**	2	2	1	6	Ret	5	4	Ret	5	1	Ret	4	Ret	3	10	7	7	6	17	Ret	WD	WD	229
7	(Spain) Roberto García	Yamaha	9	6	4	5	Ret	Ret	Ret	3	Ret	Ret	4	4	10	12	4	4	2	1	15	Ret	7	**Ret**	20	8	182
8	(Germany) Philipp Öttl	Ducati	2	11	6	6	7	1	6	NC	9	7	10	6	NC	15	6	9	28	19	11	7	10	6	16	12	173
9	(Italy) Matteo Ferrari	Ducati	6	3	17	15	14	13	5	4	7	5	7	3	Ret	7	15	13	11	14	6	9	Ret	7	6	3	173
10	(Italy) Alessandro Zaccone	Ducati	8	7	8	10	8	5	Ret	13	10	6	1	13	5	14	11	12	19	12	Ret	16	8	11	9	6	152
11	(France) Lucas Mahias	Yamaha	24	8	3	4	**5**	10	11	10	5	NC	14	Ret	27	17	29	5	4	10	Ret	10	5	5	12	7	149
12	(Italy) Filippo Farioli	Yamaha	15	13	14	16	12	12	Ret	Ret	8	9	13	15	Ret	8	10	15	9	6	3	4	11	2	8	10	133
13	(Indonesia) Aldi Mahendra	Yamaha	13	2	23	Ret	15	14	9	8	31	4	6	5	12	3	9	7	8	9	10	Ret	16	Ret	19	17	132
14	(Australia) Oli Bayliss	Triumph	3	12	Ret	Ret	18	Ret	26	DNS	6	3	Ret	9	7	16	7	16			Ret	13	2	19			94
15	(Switzerland) Dominique Aegerter	Kawasaki	23	Ret	11	18	6	15	12	15	18	12	17	18	13	13	12	14	17	15	9	12	24	8	5	2	88
16	(Italy) Mattia Casadei	Ducati	Ret	27	16	11	13	9	10	11	22	14	15	16	6	6	16	Ret	30	18	8	NC	12	9	11	9	80
17	(Denmark) Simon Jespersen	Ducati	12	16	13	14	11	11	8	9	10	Ret	9	12	8	11	14	17	14	Ret	Ret	20	14	14	Ret	DNS	72
18	(Italy) Federico Caricasulo	Zxmoto	14	19	9	17	Ret	16	15	16	12	10	29	19	9	21	Ret	18	5	8	26	8	Ret	12	14	14	62
19	(United Kingdom) Joshua Whatley (Note: Suspended from Cremona race 1 after an altercation with Simon Jespersen at Magny-Cours race 2.)	Ducati	11	17	15	13	Ret	23	14	14	15	11	16	14	11	19	18	Ret	6	Ret	EX	15	Ret	15	15	15	40
20	(France) Corentin Perolari	Honda			7	9			19	17	16	15	18	23	17	24	13	11	29	11	Ret	18	18	18	17	11	35
21	(Czech Republic) Ondřej Vostatek	Triumph	7	25	18	19	16	18	13	12	14	28	19	20	18	25	19	19	16	22	13	17	9	17	18	13	31
22	(Spain) Jorge Navarro	Triumph																	7	Ret					7	**Ret**	18
23	(Spain) Borja Jiménez	Ducati	Ret	26	28	23	26	29	18	20	24	21	22	24	Ret	27	23	25	12	20	16	19	15	10	13	18	14
24	(Italy) Andrea Giombini	MV Agusta	21	4	29	26	28	30	22	24	28	26	26	Ret	21	26	27	23	23	28	21	Ret	22	21	25	25	13
25	(Italy) Leonardo Taccini	Ducati	18	18	20	Ret	24	24	17	18	25	20	20	17	19	23	22	Ret	20	17	12	14	13	13	22	21	12
26	(Japan) Yuki Okamoto	Yamaha	17	22	22	21	19	27	24	26	19	13	24	26	20	28	21	20	13	16	20	23	20	16	Ret	DNS	6
27	(Italy) Raffaele De Rosa	QJ Motor					21	17	16	Ret	17	19	Ret	21	16	20	17	Ret	Ret	13	14	Ret	Ret	24	24	19	5
28	(Andorra) Xavier Cardelús	Yamaha	16	14	19	20	Ret	26	Ret	23	23	23	25	28	26	29											2
29	(Italy) Kevin Zannoni	Ducati													15	Ret											1
30	(Spain) Marcos Ramírez	QJ Motor					17	20	Ret	19	21	17	Ret	Ret	Ret	18	Ret	22	21	21							0
31	(Spain) Héctor Garzó	Ducati													23	Ret	24	Ret	Ret	Ret	17	26	Ret	DNS			0
32	(Czech Republic) Oliver König	Triumph	20	21	24	22	23	25	20	22	20	18	23	25	24	Ret	20	21	18	23	18	22	19	Ret	21	20	0
33	(Italy) Jacopo Cretaro	MV Agusta	19	20	30	Ret	Ret	32	21	21	27	22	21	22	22	22	Ret	Ret									0
34	(Germany) Dirk Geiger	Yamaha					20	19																			0
35	(Turkey) Bahattin Sofuoğlu	QJ Motor																			19	21	Ret	Ret	23	16	0
36	(Austria) Andreas Kofler	Yamaha			21	24	29	22	Ret	27	Ret	24	28	27	28	30	26	24	24	24	24	27	23	20	Ret	22	0
37	(Republic of Ireland) Jack Kennedy	Honda					22	21																			0
38	(Italy) Riccardo Rossi	Ducati	22	23	26	25	25	28	23	25	29	25	30	29													0
38	(Italy) Riccardo Rossi	Yamaha															NC	NC			23	Ret					0
39	(France) Samuel Di Sora	MV Agusta																	27	27	22	25	26	22	26	23	0
40	(France) Mathieu Gines	Yamaha																	22	25							0
41	(Portugal) Gonçalo Capote	Yamaha																					Ret	23			0
42	(Spain) Marco Tapia	Ducati																							Ret	24	0
43	(Spain) Julio García	Kawasaki																			Ret	24					0
44	(Spain) Ana Carrasco	Honda			27	27	27	31	25	Ret	30	27	27	30	25	31	28	27	26	26	25	Ret	25	25	27	26	0
45	(United Kingdom) Luke Stapleford	Ducati															25	26									0
46	(Portugal) Martim Jesus	Honda			Ret	28																					0
47	(Spain) Eric Fernández	Yamaha																					Ret	Ret	28	Ret	0
	(Turkey) Kadir Erbay	Ducati											Ret	Ret													0
Pos	Rider	Bike	PHI (Australia)		POR (Portugal)		ASS (Netherlands)		BAL (Hungary)		MOS (Czech Republic)		ARA (Spain)		MIS (Emilia-Romagna)		DON (United Kingdom)		MAG (France)		CRE (Italy)		EST (Portugal)		JER (Spain)		Pts

Colour	Result
Gold	Winner
Silver	Second place
Bronze	Third place
Green	Points classification
Blue	Non-points classification
Blue	Non-classified finish (NC)
Purple	Retired, not classified (Ret)
Red	Did not qualify (DNQ)
Red	Did not pre-qualify (DNPQ)
Black	Disqualified (DSQ)
White	Did not start (DNS)
White	Withdrew (WD)
White	Race cancelled (C)
Blank	Did not practice (DNP)
Blank	Did not arrive (DNA)
Blank	Excluded (EX)

**Bold** – Pole position
Italics – Fastest lap

=== Teams' championship ===
Pos	Teams	Bike No.	PHI (Australia)		POR (Portugal)		ASS (Netherlands)		BAL (Hungary)		MOS (Czech Republic)		ARA (Spain)		MIS (Emilia-Romagna)		DON (United Kingdom)		MAG (France)		CRE (Italy)		EST (Portugal)		JER (Spain)		Pts
Pos	Teams	Bike No.	R1	R2	R1	R2	R1	R2	R1	R2	R1	R2	R1	R2	R1	R2	R1	R2	R1	R2	R1	R2	R1	R2	R1	R2	Pts
1	(Italy) AS bLU cRU Racing Team	57	13	2	23	Ret	15	14	9	8	31	4	6	5	12	3	9	7	8	9	6	Ret	16	Ret	19	17	521
1	(Italy) AS bLU cRU Racing Team	75	4	1	5	3	2	**2**	**2**	**1**	3	Ret	**2**	2	2	1	2	2	Ret	2	2	2	4	Ret	**1**	Ret	521
2	(Italy) Zxmoto Factory Evan Bros Racing	53	25	24	1	**1**	4	7	1	Ret	1	**1**	8	8	1	**9**	8	10	**3**	3	4	5	6	3	10	5	370
2	(Italy) Zxmoto Factory Evan Bros Racing	64	14	19	9	17	Ret	16	15	16	12	10	29	19	9	21	Ret	18	5	8	26	8	Ret	12	14	14	370
3	(Italy) Kawasaki WorldSSP Team	52	10	9	10	7	9	8	4	7	13	8	11	10	14	5	3	6	15	5	**1**	1	3	1	2	1	362
3	(Italy) Kawasaki WorldSSP Team	77	23	Ret	11	18	6	15	12	15	18	12	17	18	13	13	12	14	17	15	9	12	24	8	5	2	362
4	(United Kingdom) PTR Triumph Factory Racing	9																	7	Ret					7	**Ret**	342
4	(United Kingdom) PTR Triumph Factory Racing	32	3	12	Ret	Ret	18	Ret	26	DNS	6	3	Ret	9	7	16	7	16			Ret	13	2	19			342
4	(United Kingdom) PTR Triumph Factory Racing	69	Ret	15	12	12	3	4	7	6	26	16	3	**7**	4	2	1	**1**	25	**Ret**	5	**3**	1	Ret	4	Ret	342
5	(France) GMT94 Yamaha	37	9	6	4	5	Ret	Ret	Ret	3	Ret	Ret	4	4	10	12	4	4	2	1	15	Ret	7	**Ret**	20	8	331
5	(France) GMT94 Yamaha	56																	22	25							331
5	(France) GMT94 Yamaha	94	24	8	3	4	**5**	10	11	10	5	NC	14	Ret	27	17	29	5	4	10	Ret	10	5	5	12	7	331
6	(Spain) Orelac Racing Verdnatura	5	**1**	**10**	2	2	1	6	Ret	5	4	Ret	5	1	Ret	4	Ret	3	10	7	7	6	17	Ret	WD	WD	269
6	(Spain) Orelac Racing Verdnatura	70	11	17	15	13	Ret	23	14	14	15	11	16	14	11	19	18	Ret	6	Ret	EX	15	Ret	15	15	15	269
7	(Netherlands) Pata Yamaha Ten Kate Racing	31	17	22	22	21	19	27	24	26	19	13	24	26	20	28	21	20	13	16	20	23	20	16	Ret	DNS	269
7	(Netherlands) Pata Yamaha Ten Kate Racing	61	5	5	**25**	8	10	3	3	2	**2**	2	12	11	**3**	10	**5**	8	1	4	27	11	**21**	4	3	4	269
8	(Czech Republic) WRP Racing	11	6	3	17	15	14	13	5	4	7	5	7	3	Ret	7	15	13	11	14	6	9	Ret	7	6	3	187
8	(Czech Republic) WRP Racing	91	Ret	26	28	23	26	29	18	20	24	21	22	24	Ret	27	23	25	12	20	16	19	15	10	13	18	187
9	(Italy) Feel Racing WorldSSP Team	65	2	11	6	6	7	1	6	NC	9	7	10	6	NC	15	6	9	28	19	11	7	10	6	16	12	173
10	(Italy) Ecosantagata Althea Racing Team	10	18	18	20	Ret	24	24	17	18	25	20	20	17	19	23	22	Ret	20	17	12	14	13	13	22	21	164
10	(Italy) Ecosantagata Althea Racing Team	16	8	7	8	10	8	5	Ret	13	11	6	1	13	5	14	11	12	19	12	Ret	16	8	11	9	6	164
11	(Italy) VFT Racing Yamaha	7	15	13	14	16	12	12	Ret	Ret	8	9	13	15	Ret	8	10	15	9	6	3	4	11	2	8	10	133
12	(Italy) D34G WorldSSP Racing Team	40	Ret	27	16	11	13	9	10	11	22	14	15	16	6	6	16	Ret	30	18	8	NC	12	9	11	9	80
13	(Netherlands) EAB Racing Team	43	12	16	13	14	11	11	8	9	10	Ret	9	12	8	11	14	17	14	Ret	Ret	20	14	14	Ret	DNS	72
14	(France) Honda Racing WorldSSP Team	4					22	21																			35
14	(France) Honda Racing WorldSSP Team	6			7	9			19	17	16	15	18	23	17	24	13	11	29	11	Ret	18	18	18	17	11	35
14	(France) Honda Racing WorldSSP Team	22			27	27	27	31	25	Ret	30	27	27	30	25	31	28	27	26	26	25	Ret	25	25	27	26	35
15	(Czech Republic) Compos Racing Team	25	20	21	24	22	23	25	20	22	20	18	23	25	24	Ret	20	21	18	23	18	22	19	Ret	21	20	31
15	(Czech Republic) Compos Racing Team	50	7	25	18	19	16	18	13	12	14	28	19	20	18	25	19	19	16	22	13	17	9	17	18	13	31
16	(Italy) Motozoo by Madforce Dubai	88	21	4	29	26	28	30	22	24	28	26	26	Ret	21	26	27	23	23	28	21	Ret	22	21	25	25	13
17	(China) QJMotor Factory Racing	3					21	17	16	Ret	17	19	Ret	21	16	20	17	Ret	Ret	13	14	Ret	Ret	24	24	19	5
17	(China) QJMotor Factory Racing	24					17	20	Ret	19	21	17	Ret	Ret	Ret	18	Ret	22	21	21							5
17	(China) QJMotor Factory Racing	99																			19	21	Ret	Ret	23	16	5
18	(Spain) Cerba Yamaha Racing Team	20	16	14	19	20	Ret	26	Ret	23	23	23	25	28	26	29											2
18	(Spain) Cerba Yamaha Racing Team	47																					Ret	Ret	28	Ret	2
18	(Spain) Cerba Yamaha Racing Team	54															NC	NC			23	Ret					2
19	(Italy) Broncos Racing Team	21													15	Ret											1
20	(Italy) Renzi Corse	28																							Ret	24	0
20	(Italy) Renzi Corse	44													23	Ret	24	Ret	Ret	Ret	17	26	Ret	DNS			0
20	(Italy) Renzi Corse	54	22	23	26	25	25	28	23	25	29	25	30	29													0
21	(France) Flembbo by Racing Development	23																	27	27	22	25	26	22	26	23	0
21	(France) Flembbo by Racing Development	73	19	20	30	Ret	Ret	32	21	21	27	22	21	22	22	22	Ret	Ret									0
22	(Netherlands) Team Apreco	60					20	19																			0
23	(Austria) Motorsport Kofler	19			21	24	29	22	Ret	27	Ret	24	28	27	28	30	26	24	24	24	24	27	23	20	Ret	22	0
24	(Portugal) Motos VR Yamaha Racing Team	76																					Ret	23			0
25	(Italy) MRT Corse	48																			Ret	24					0
26	(United Kingdom) Scars–Racing	81															25	26									0
27	(Portugal) Rosa Competicion/MCL	58			Ret	28																					0
	(Spain) I+Dent Racing Team	41											Ret	Ret													0
Pos	Team	Bike No.	PHI (Australia)		POR (Portugal)		ASS (Netherlands)		BAL (Hungary)		MOS (Czech Republic)		ARA (Spain)		MIS (Emilia-Romagna)		DON (United Kingdom)		MAG (France)		CRE (Italy)		EST (Portugal)		JER (Spain)		Pts

=== Manufacturers' championship ===
Pos	Manufacturer	PHI (Australia)		POR (Portugal)		ASS (Netherlands)		BAL (Hungary)		MOS (Czech Republic)		ARA (Spain)		MIS (Emilia-Romagna)		DON (United Kingdom)		MAG (France)		CRE (Italy)		EST (Portugal)		JER (Spain)		Pts
Pos	Manufacturer	R1	R2	R1	R2	R1	R2	R1	R2	R1	R2	R1	R2	R1	R2	R1	R2	R1	R2	R1	R2	R1	R2	R1	R2	Pts
1	(Japan) Yamaha	4	1	3	3	2	2	2	1	2	2	2	2	2	1	2	2	1	1	2	2	4	2	1	4	481
2	(Italy) Ducati	1	3	2	2	1	1	5	4	4	5	1	1	5	4	6	3	6	7	6	6	8	6	6	3	362
3	(China) Zxmoto	14	19	1	1	4	7	1	16	1	1	8	8	1	9	8	10	3	3	4	5	6	3	10	5	310
4	(United Kingdom) Triumph	3	12	12	12	3	4	7	6	6	3	3	7	4	2	1	1	7	22	5	3	1	17	4	13	287
5	(Japan) Kawasaki	10	9	10	7	6	8	4	7	13	8	11	10	13	5	3	6	15	5	1	1	3	1	2	1	278
6	(Japan) Honda			7	9	22	21	19	17	16	15	18	23	17	24	13	11	26	11	25	18	18	18	17	11	35
7	(Italy) MV Agusta	19	4	29	26	28	30	21	21	27	22	20	22	21	22	27	23	23	27	21	25	22	21	25	23	13
8	(China) QJ Motor					17	17	17	19	17	17	Ret	21	16	18	17	22	21	13	14	21	Ret	24	23	16	5
Pos	Manufacturer	PHI (Australia)		POR (Portugal)		ASS (Netherlands)		BAL (Hungary)		MOS (Czech Republic)		ARA (Spain)		MIS (Emilia-Romagna)		DON (United Kingdom)		MAG (France)		CRE (Italy)		EST (Portugal)		JER (Spain)		Pts
