= 2025 New Zealand Motocross Championship =

New Zealand Motocross Competition in 2025

The 2025 New Zealand Motocross Championship season, known for sponsorship reasons as the Yamaha New Zealand Motocross Championship, was the 51st New Zealand Motocross Championship season.

The series consisted of four rounds across the country, running from mid February to mid March.

Hamish Harwood was the reigning champion in the MX1 class, after picking up his sixth national title in the 2024 season. Ultimately, it was Maximus Purvis who took the title in the MX1 class, his fourth national title overall.

In the MX2 class, James Scott was the reigning champion, after picking up his first senior national title in the previous season. Madoc Dixon won two of the four rounds in the MX2 class to take his first senior national title.

The second and final rounds of the series were held at the Rotorua track, after the original venue for the final round pulled out of running it prior to the start of the season.

== Race calendar and results ==
=== MX1 ===
Round	Date	Location	Race 1 Winner	Race 2 Winner	Race 3 Winner	Round Winner
1	15 February	Tauranga	(New Zealand) Maximus Purvis	(New Zealand) Maximus Purvis	(New Zealand) Maximus Purvis	(New Zealand) Maximus Purvis
2	22 February	Rotorua	(New Zealand) Maximus Purvis	(New Zealand) Maximus Purvis	(New Zealand) Hamish Harwood	(New Zealand) Maximus Purvis
3	8 March	Pukekohe	(New Zealand) Josiah Natzke	(New Zealand) Maximus Purvis	(New Zealand) Hamish Harwood	(New Zealand) Josiah Natzke
4	15 March	Rotorua	(New Zealand) Hamish Harwood	(New Zealand) Hamish Harwood	(New Zealand) Maximus Purvis	(New Zealand) Hamish Harwood

=== MX2 ===
Round	Date	Location	Race 1 Winner	Race 2 Winner	Race 3 Winner	Round Winner
1	15 February	Tauranga	(New Zealand) Madoc Dixon	(New Zealand) James Scott	(New Zealand) Madoc Dixon	(New Zealand) Madoc Dixon
2	22 February	Rotorua	(New Zealand) Madoc Dixon	(New Zealand) James Scott	(New Zealand) Cobie Bourke	(New Zealand) Madoc Dixon
3	8 March	Pukekohe	(New Zealand) Cobie Bourke	(New Zealand) Madoc Dixon	(New Zealand) Flynn Watts	(New Zealand) Cody Cooper
4	15 March	Rotorua	(New Zealand) Cody Cooper	(New Zealand) Flynn Watts	(New Zealand) Cody Cooper	(New Zealand) Cody Cooper

=== Circuit locations ===
2024 New Zealand Motocross Championship locations

== MX1 ==
=== Participants ===
Team	Constructor	No	Rider	Rounds
Honda Racing Motul New Zealand	Honda	H	(Japan) Haruki Yokoyama	All
Honda Racing Motul New Zealand	Honda	30	(New Zealand) Josiah Natzke	All
Honda Racing Motul New Zealand	Honda	41	(New Zealand) Curtis King	1–2
Tasman Honda/Alpinestars/Motul	Honda	J	(Australia) Jesse Bishop	1–2
Tasman Honda/Alpinestars/Motul	Honda	M	(Australia) Mitch Norris	1–2
CML KTM Racing	KTM	1	(New Zealand) Hamish Harwood	All
CML KTM Racing	KTM	192	(New Zealand) Reuben Smith	All
Bike Torque Taumaranui	Gas Gas	5	(New Zealand) Luke Maitland	All
Makz Gear Tauranga/Vertex Oil	KTM	7	(New Zealand) Seth Thompson	1–3
Phoenix Civil/Un4seen Decals	Gas Gas	18	(New Zealand) Josh de Reus	All
Pumps & Filters	Yamaha	24	(New Zealand) Liam Hutton	All
Altherm JCR Yamaha	Yamaha	44	(New Zealand) Maximus Purvis	All
Underclass/AG Flow Solutions	Yamaha	49	(Australia) Cody O'Loan	3
	Yamaha	52	(New Zealand) Sam Bowers	All
BSH Race Team	Honda	55	(New Zealand) Jack Symon	All
	Honda	60	(New Zealand) Jacob Steel	All
Tasman Honda/Mahana Earthworks	Honda	81	(New Zealand) Hayden Wilkinson	All
Central House Movers/Sixteen Graphic Co	Yamaha	91	(New Zealand) James Kilpatrick	All
TSS Motocycles	KTM	124	(New Zealand) Zak Nolan	1, 3–4
Degree Building Ltd	KTM	141	(New Zealand) Cooper Smith	All
SMG All Build/Redline Earthworks	Yamaha	143	(New Zealand) Josh Bartosh	1
Team MR Moto	KTM	144	(New Zealand) Tyler Brown	All
MecaMoto.co/P1 Moto	Yamaha	157	(New Zealand) Logan Maddren	3–4
	KTM	188	(New Zealand) Lochie Birrell	All
	Yamaha	255	(New Zealand) Luke van der Lee	All
P1moto/Mecamoto.co/Guts Racing NZ	Yamaha	299	(New Zealand) Ben Lawson	All
Stihl Shop Hamilton East	Honda	336	(New Zealand) Joel Hansen	3
AFC Motorcycles	KTM	393	(New Zealand) Toby Winiata	All
LMC Husqvarna Racing	Husqvarna	485	(Australia) Caleb Ward	All
LMC Husqvarna Racing	Husqvarna	918	(New Zealand) Callan May	All
Blue Wing Honda	Honda	614	(New Zealand) Peter Broxholme	1
AFC Motorcycles/MotoSR	KTM	705	(New Zealand) Charlie Richardson	1–3
MR Motorcycles/bLU cRU/M.A.S.S. Seaforth Farms	Yamaha	717	(New Zealand) Jayden McKenzie	1, 3–4
	Honda	731	(New Zealand) Callum Dudson	1
Keen Solutions/TSS Motorcycles	KTM	872	(New Zealand) Adam Moss	All
Bay Motorcycles/Shark Engineering HB	Kawasaki	917	(New Zealand) Kieran Scheele	All
Honda Hub - Crown Kiwi Enterprises	Honda	950	(New Zealand) Preeda Boon	All

=== Riders Championship ===
Points are awarded to finishers of the main races, in the following format:

Position	1st	2nd	3rd	4th	5th	6th	7th	8th	9th	10th	11th	12th	13th	14th	15th	16th	17th	18th	19th	20th
Points	25	22	20	18	16	15	14	13	12	11	10	9	8	7	6	5	4	3	2	1

Pos	Rider	Bike	TAU			ROT			PUK			ROT			Points
1	(New Zealand) Maximus Purvis	Yamaha	1	1	1	1	1	2	3	1	4	3	3	1	275
2	(New Zealand) Hamish Harwood	KTM	3	3	4	3	3	1	2	3	1	1	1	3	260
3	(New Zealand) Josiah Natzke	Honda	2	2	2	2	2	4	1	2	2	2	2	5	257
4	(Australia) Caleb Ward	Husqvarna	4	4	3	4	4	3	4	4	3	4	4	2	226
5	(New Zealand) Jack Symon	Honda	6	7	7	9	7	9	7	8	5	7	7	7	166
6	(New Zealand) Luke Maitland	Gas Gas	9	5	13	5	5	Ret	8	5	8	6	8	4	156
7	(New Zealand) Tyler Brown	KTM	12	8	11	10	9	10	10	6	6	8	6	8	148
8	(New Zealand) Reuben Smith	KTM	8	6	8	7	8	6	9	9	10	12	Ret	9	139
9	(Japan) Haruki Yokoyama	Honda	7	9	5	DNS	DNS	DNS	6	7	7	5	5	6	132
10	(New Zealand) Luke van der Lee	Yamaha	10	10	12	8	10	11	11	11	11	13	10	15	120
11	(New Zealand) Seth Thompson	KTM	5	28	6	6	6	5	5	10	Ret				104
12	(New Zealand) Preeda Boon	Honda	15	29	9	14	14	8	14	12	Ret	9	9	10	96
13	(New Zealand) Adam Moss	KTM	16	17	16	11	12	15	17	16	15	10	12	13	82
14	(New Zealand) Toby Winiata	KTM	11	12	15	15	16	13	18	14	20	16	13	14	75
15	(New Zealand) Kieran Scheele	Kawasaki	17	DNS	21	20	11	7	25	15	13	11	14	11	70
16	(New Zealand) Callan May	Husqvarna	13	13	17	22	18	21	19	18	12	15	11	12	62
17	(New Zealand) Hayden Wilkinson	Honda	23	18	20	13	15	16	21	19	Ret	17	15	17	39
18	(New Zealand) Jacob Steel	Honda	18	15	18	16	Ret	DNS	20	17	16	14	Ret	19	36
19	(New Zealand) Jayden McKenzie	Yamaha	19	Ret	DNS				12	13	14	Ret	16	16	36
20	(Australia) Jesse Bishop	Honda	14	14	19	17	13	14							35
21	(Australia) Mitch Norris	Honda	Ret	19	14	12	17	12							31
22	(New Zealand) Curtis King	Honda	21	11	10	18	22	20							25
23	(New Zealand) Cooper Smith	KTM	20	16	26	24	20	24	15	24	18	21	17	18	23
24	(Australia) Cody O'Loan	Yamaha							13	30	9				20
25	(New Zealand) Josh de Reus	Gas Gas	25	20	22	19	21	18	22	23	19	19	18	20	14
26	(New Zealand) Lochie Birrell	KTM	24	22	Ret	23	19	17	16	21	23	20	23	DNS	12
27	(New Zealand) Sam Bowers	Yamaha	26	24	23	21	23	23	24	20	17	18	19	21	10
28	(New Zealand) James Kilpatrick	Yamaha	22	21	24	25	24	19	27	27	25	DNS	DNS	DNS	2
29	(New Zealand) Logan Maddren	Yamaha							23	Ret	21	23	20	22	1
	(New Zealand) Ben Lawson	Yamaha	29	25	27	27	26	25	26	26	26	22	21	DNS	0
	(New Zealand) Joel Hansen	Honda							28	22	22				0
	(New Zealand) Charlie Richardson	KTM	28	23	25	26	25	22	Ret	25	24				0
	(New Zealand) Liam Hutton	Yamaha	31	26	28	28	27	26	30	29	28	24	22	23	0
	(New Zealand) Zak Nolan	KTM	30	27	Ret				29	28	27	Ret	DNS	DNS	0
	(New Zealand) Callum Dudson	Honda	27	Ret	DNS										0
	(New Zealand) Josh Bartosh	Yamaha	Ret	Ret	Ret										0
	(New Zealand) Peter Broxholme	Honda	DNS	DNS	DNS										0
Pos	Rider	Bike	TAU			ROT			PUK			ROT			Points

== MX2 ==
=== Participants ===
Team	Constructor	No	Rider	Rounds
Altherm JCR Yamaha	Yamaha	1	(New Zealand) James Scott	1–2
Honda Motul Racing New Zealand	Honda	14	(New Zealand) Cobie Bourke	All
Honda Motul Racing New Zealand	Honda	41	(New Zealand) Curtis King	3–4
Honda Motul Racing New Zealand	Honda	110	(New Zealand) Rian King	1–3
LMC Husqvarna Racing	Husqvarna	15	(New Zealand) Hayden Smith	All
LMC Husqvarna Racing	Husqvarna	96	(New Zealand) Hayden Draper	All
Yamaha Whangarei/FXR Racing New Zealand	Yamaha	20	(New Zealand) Logan Denize	All
Team MR Moto	Yamaha	22	(New Zealand) Flynn Watts	All
Team MR Moto	Yamaha	809	(New Zealand) Tyler Cooksley	All
Team MR Moto	KTM	999	(New Zealand) Jared Hannon	All
Promoto/Un4Seen	Yamaha	28	(New Zealand) Tyler Steiner	All
Watson Motorcycles/Crown Kiwi	Kawasaki	29	(New Zealand) Maz Parkes	All
Yamaha NZ/Yamalube/The Riders Circle	Yamaha	32	(New Zealand) James Rountree	All
Nelson Motorcycles/Nelson Brake Services	KTM	43	(New Zealand) Luke Heaphy	All
Kawasaki New Zealand	Kawasaki	47	(New Zealand) Jack Coleman	1–2
Kawasaki New Zealand	Kawasaki	338	(New Zealand) Brad Groombridge	All
Extreme Motorsports/Workshop Graphics	Yamaha	80	(New Zealand) Jono Hill	All
Bike Torque Taumaranui	Gas Gas	93	(New Zealand) Alex Maitland	1–3
Yamaha Motor Company/Yamaha New Zealand/JCR	Yamaha	100	(Japan) Junya Tanaka	All
Yamaha Motor Company/Yamaha New Zealand/JCR	Yamaha	215	(Japan) Souya Nakajima	All
Team Rees Motorcycles	Honda	100	(New Zealand) Aydan Hall	All
Pumpn/Boyds Motorcycles/Troy Lee Designs NZ	KTM	112	(New Zealand) Cooper Phillips	All
CML Gas Gas	Gas Gas	121	(New Zealand) Cody Cooper	All
CML Gas Gas	Gas Gas	722	(New Zealand) Phoenix van Dusschoten	1
Motorcycle Performance/Murray Thorn Motorcycles	Yamaha	122	(New Zealand) Wills Harvey	All
P1 Moto/Meca	Husqvarna	137	(New Zealand) Leo Copping	1–3
Powerzone/Jack Refrigeration Ltd	Husqvarna	226	(New Zealand) Max Pagan	3
Rae Emerson Motorsport Developments	KTM	278	(New Zealand) Yanni Emerson-Rae	All
JMR/Yamaha NZ	Yamaha	309	(New Zealand) Nixon Parkes	All
CML KTM Racing	KTM	318	(New Zealand) Madoc Dixon	All
Craig Stevens Motorcycles	Yamaha	321	(New Zealand) Cody Griffiths	All
KTM Offroad Racing Team	KTM	486	(New Zealand) Ryan Hayward	1, 3–4
Kawasaki NZ Team Green	Kawasaki	488	(New Zealand) Riley Soutar	1
CNC Profile Cutting Services	Yamaha	554	(New Zealand) Oliver Ayre	1–2
Blackwood Yamaha/Crown Kiwi Enterprise	Yamaha	972	(New Zealand) Carlin Hedley	All

=== Riders Championship ===
Points are awarded to finishers of the main races, in the following format:

Position	1st	2nd	3rd	4th	5th	6th	7th	8th	9th	10th	11th	12th	13th	14th	15th	16th	17th	18th	19th	20th
Points	25	22	20	18	16	15	14	13	12	11	10	9	8	7	6	5	4	3	2	1

Pos	Rider	Bike	TAU			ROT			PUK			ROT			Points
1	(New Zealand) Madoc Dixon	KTM	1	6	1	1	2	3	26	1	2	4	2	5	235
2	(New Zealand) Cobie Bourke	Honda	2	4	4	3	4	1	1	4	10	10	3	3	226
3	(New Zealand) Hayden Smith	Husqvarna	7	7	7	4	5	5	3	3	6	3	4	2	207
4	(New Zealand) Flynn Watts	Yamaha	4	3	6	5	8	Ret	7	5	1	2	1	6	199
5	(New Zealand) Cody Cooper	Gas Gas	19	2	2	7	Ret	DNS	2	2	5	1	6	1	185
6	(New Zealand) Brad Groombridge	Kawasaki	6	5	5	14	10	6	6	7	4	6	5	4	176
7	(New Zealand) Jared Hannon	KTM	10	15	10	12	14	11	9	6	3	11	9	8	136
8	(Japan) Junya Tanaka	Yamaha	11	12	12	6	7	Ret	12	9	7	7	7	12	129
9	(New Zealand) James Scott	Yamaha	3	1	3	2	1	Ret							112
10	(New Zealand) Rian King	Honda	9	8	8	8	6	4	4	15	DNS				108
11	(New Zealand) Hayden Draper	Husqvarna	8	9	16	17	17	18	5	8	9	12	12	16	105
12	(New Zealand) Logan Denize	Yamaha	5	11	11	11	11	7	14	18	19	13	18	14	100
13	(New Zealand) Wills Harvey	Yamaha	18	22	17	15	15	10	11	10	8	14	8	7	98
14	(Japan) Souya Nakajima	Yamaha	25	10	9	9	3	2	10	13	Ret	Ret	DNS	DNS	96
15	(New Zealand) Cody Griffiths	Yamaha	14	20	19	13	12	9	21	22	12	8	11	9	83
16	(New Zealand) Nixon Parkes	Yamaha	21	18	23	21	21	12	15	11	15	5	13	10	69
17	(New Zealand) Cooper Phillips	KTM	12	21	14	Ret	16	Ret	8	12	13	15	16	15	68
18	(New Zealand) Luke Heaphy	KTM	22	17	28	19	18	16	13	14	16	9	10	11	67
19	(New Zealand) Tyler Steiner	Yamaha	20	Ret	Ret	10	9	8	25	19	14	16	Ret	DNS	51
20	(New Zealand) Carlin Hedley	Yamaha	27	19	32	24	13	13	19	20	18	17	15	13	42
21	(New Zealand) Ryan Hayward	KTM	15	16	18				16	17	17	18	14	18	40
22	(New Zealand) Jack Coleman	Kawasaki	17	14	13	16	Ret	DNS							24
23	(New Zealand) Phoenix van Dusschoten	Gas Gas	13	13	15										22
24	(New Zealand) Maz Parkes	Kawasaki	16	27	29	20	22	17	17	Ret	23	19	19	22	18
25	(New Zealand) Aydan Hall	Honda	28	25	22	18	20	14	22	16	22	22	20	21	17
26	(New Zealand) Tyler Cooksley	Yamaha	23	23	21	22	19	15	20	Ret	21	23	17	17	17
27	(New Zealand) Curtis King	Honda							18	23	11	20	22	23	14
28	(New Zealand) James Rountree	Yamaha	Ret	24	27	25	23	Ret	23	21	20	21	21	19	3
29	(New Zealand) Yanni Emerson-Rae	KTM	30	29	26	27	25	19	24	24	24	24	23	20	3
30	(New Zealand) Leo Copping	Husqvarna	26	28	25	26	26	20	Ret	25	25				1
31	(New Zealand) Oliver Ayre	Yamaha	29	Ret	20	Ret	DNS	DNS							1
	(New Zealand) Alex Maitland	Gas Gas	24	26	24	23	24	21	Ret	DNS	DNS				0
	(New Zealand) Jono Hill	Yamaha	32	31	30	28	27	22	28	27	27	25	24	24	0
	(New Zealand) Max Pagan	Husqvarna							27	26	26				0
	(New Zealand) Riley Soutar	Kawasaki	31	30	31										0
Pos	Rider	Bike	TAU			ROT			PUK			ROT			Points
