= Tokorua =

Island in French Polynesia

Coordinates: 23.17°S 135.1°W

Tokorua is an island of the Gambier Islands of French Polynesia. The name means "companion, mate" (or two – as it does in Māori) in the local Mangareva language.

== See also ==
- Desert island
- List of islands
