= ZXMOTO =

Chinese vehicle manufacturer

- Native name: 重庆张雪机车工业有限公司
- Industry: Automotive
- Founded: 2024; 2 years ago
- Founder: Zhang Xue (President)
- Headquarters: Chongqing, China
- Key people: Zhang Xue (CEO)
- Revenue: CN¥ 750 million (2025)
- Net income: CN¥ 22.78 million (2025)
- Website: global.zxmoto.com

ZXMOTO (Chinese: 张雪机车; officially Chongqing Zhang Xue Motorcycle Industry Co., Ltd. (重庆张雪机车工业有限公司)) is a Chinese motorcycle manufacturer founded in 2024 by Zhang Xue.

== History ==
ZXMOTO was established in 2024 by Zhang Xue following his departure from Kove Moto in 2024. The company made its international debut at the EICMA motorcycle show in Milan in 2025, where it presented a multi-segment product lineup.

ZXMOTO has pursued international expansion, including entry into the European market through distribution partnerships reported in 2026.

== Products ==
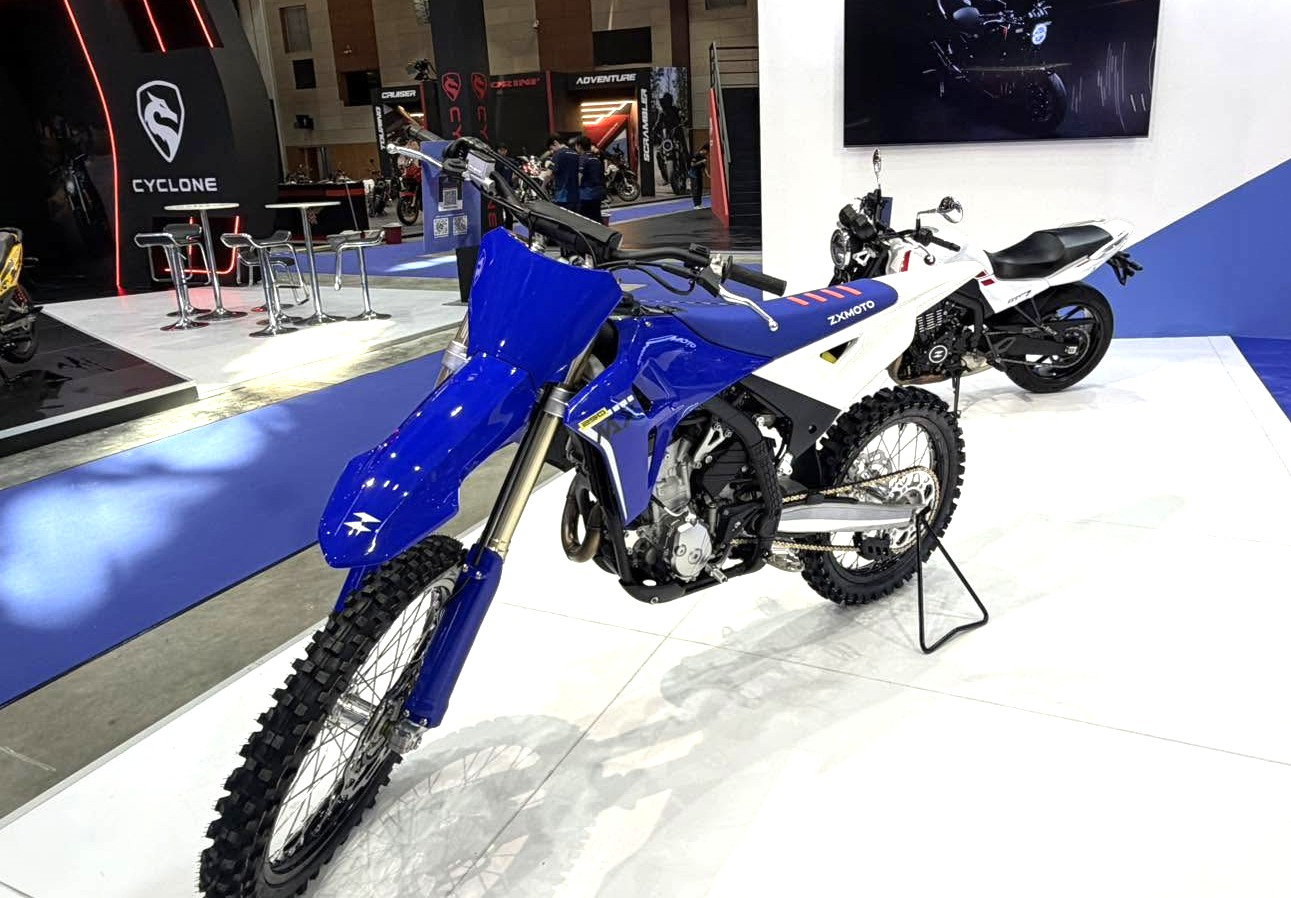
ZXMOTO MX250

ZXMOTO 600V

ZXMOTO produces motorcycles across multiple segments.

Sport

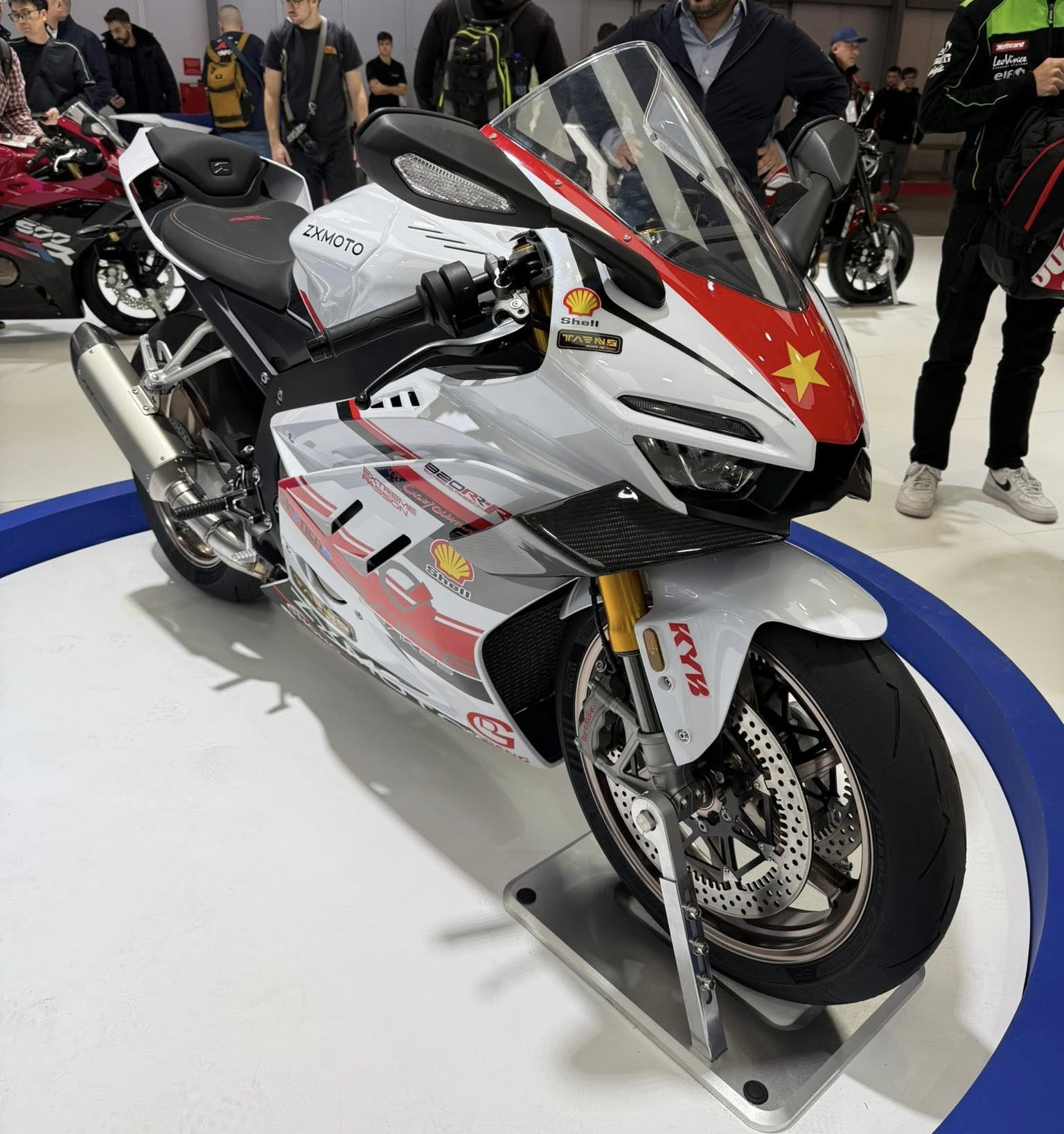
ZXMOTO 820RR-RS

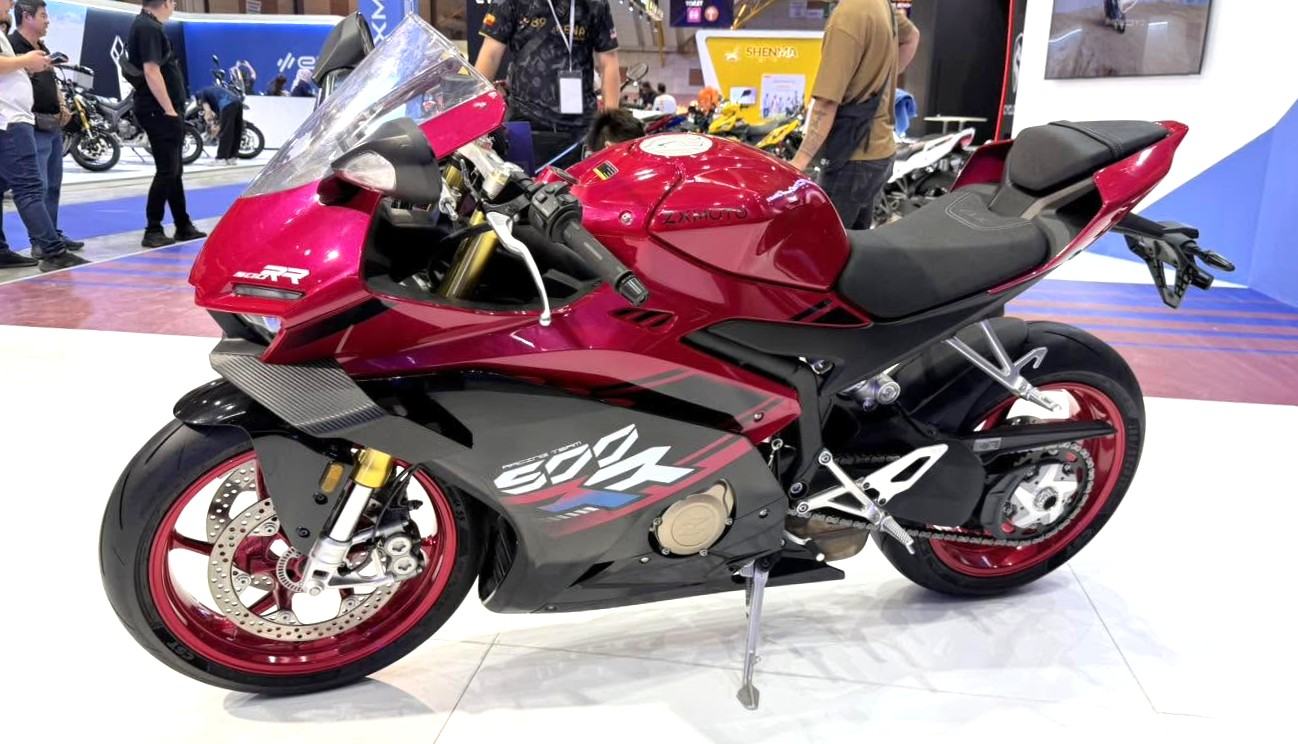
ZXMOTO 500RR

- ZXMOTO 500RR
- ZXMOTO 820RR
- ZXMOTO 820RR-R
- ZXMOTO 820RR-RS

Naked

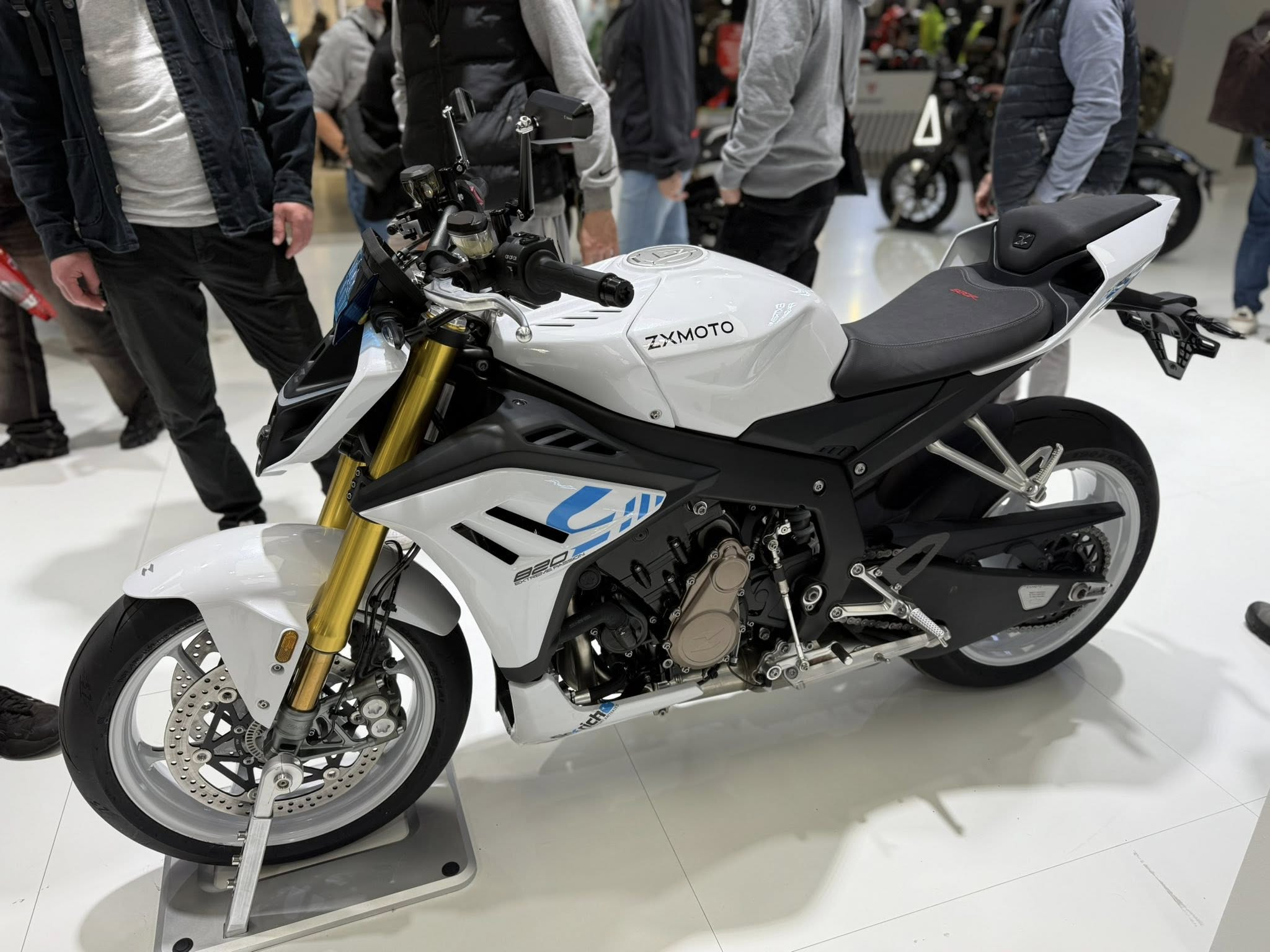
ZXMOTO 820R

ZXMOTO 500F

- ZXMOTO 500F
- ZXMOTO 820R

Off-road

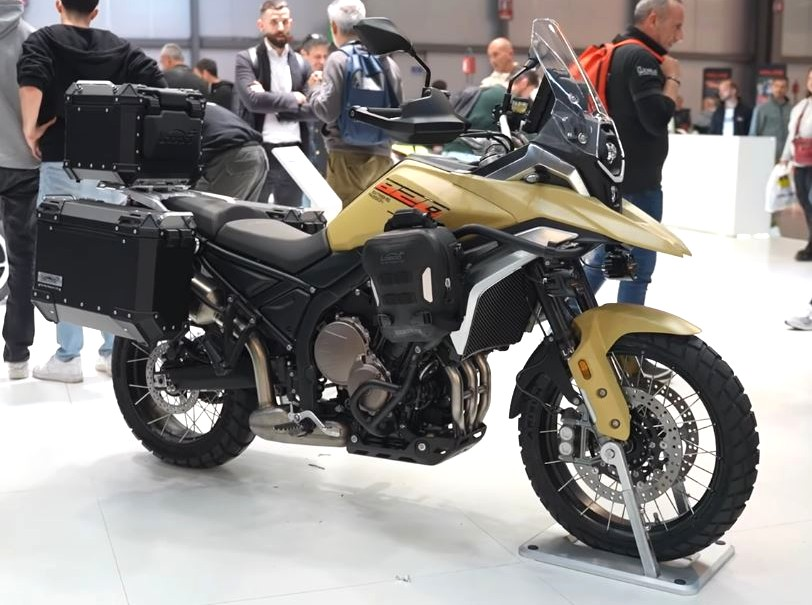
ZXMOTO 820 ADV

ZXMOTO 820X

- ZXMOTO 820 ADV
- ZXMOTO 820X
- ZXMOTO 450 Rally
- ZXMOTO MX250

== Motorsport ==
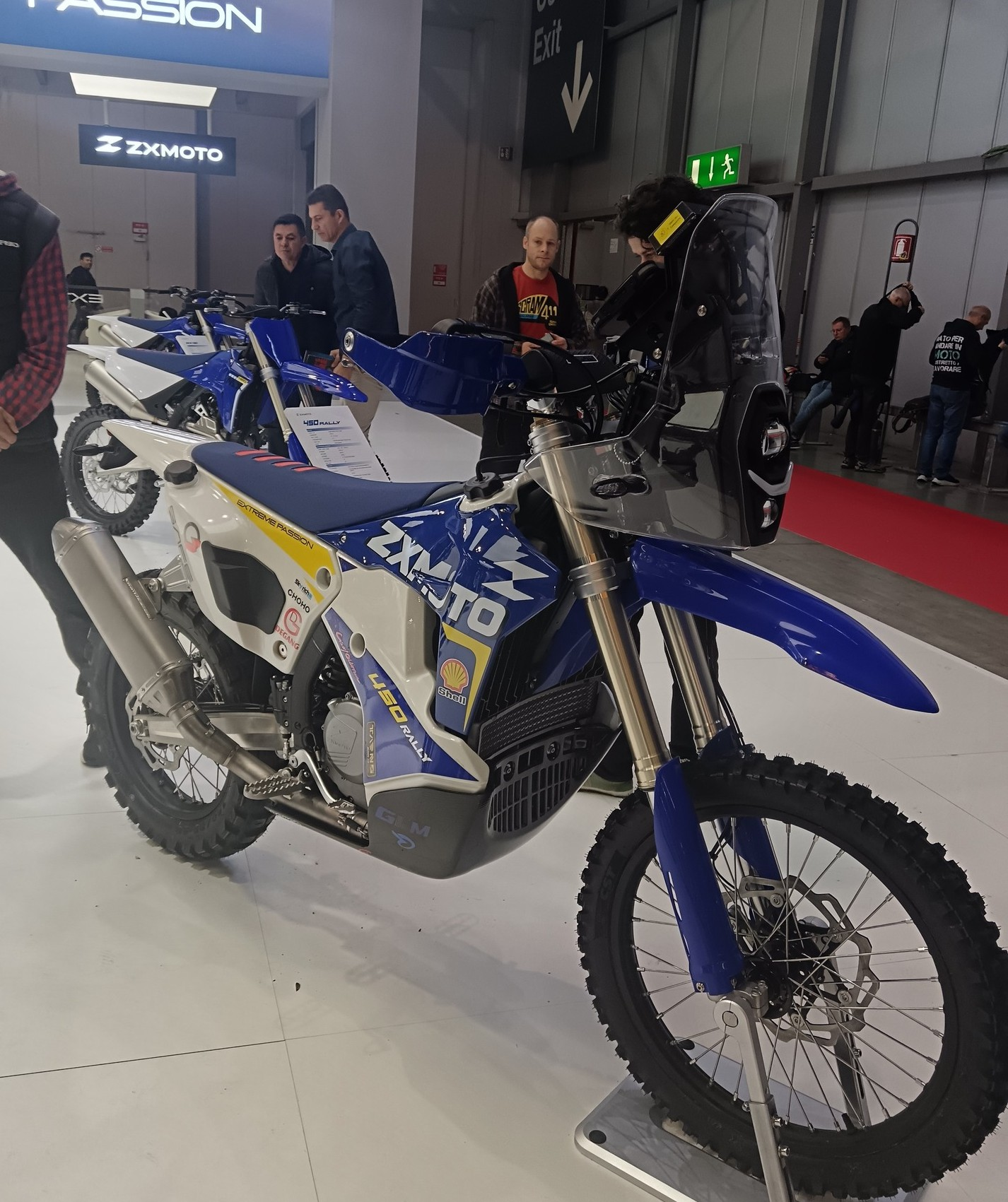
ZXMoto 450 Rally

ZXMOTO entered international competition in the Supersport World Championship in 2026 in partnership with Evan Bros Racing.

During the 2026 season, rider Valentin Debise achieved two race wins for the ZXMOTO Factory Evan Bros Racing team, with the victories coming in only the manufacturer's second round of participation in the championship.

On May 2, 2026, Zhang Xue Racing secured the victory in Race 1 of the WorldSSP category at the Hungarian Round.

On 16 and 17 May 2026, ZXMoto secured both race wins over the Czechia Round of the WorldSSP Championship, marking its fifth WorldSSP win since joining in the 2026 season. With this double victory, Zhang Xue Motorcycles became one of the teams with the most wins so far in the 2026 season.
