= Valentin Debise =

French motorcycle racer

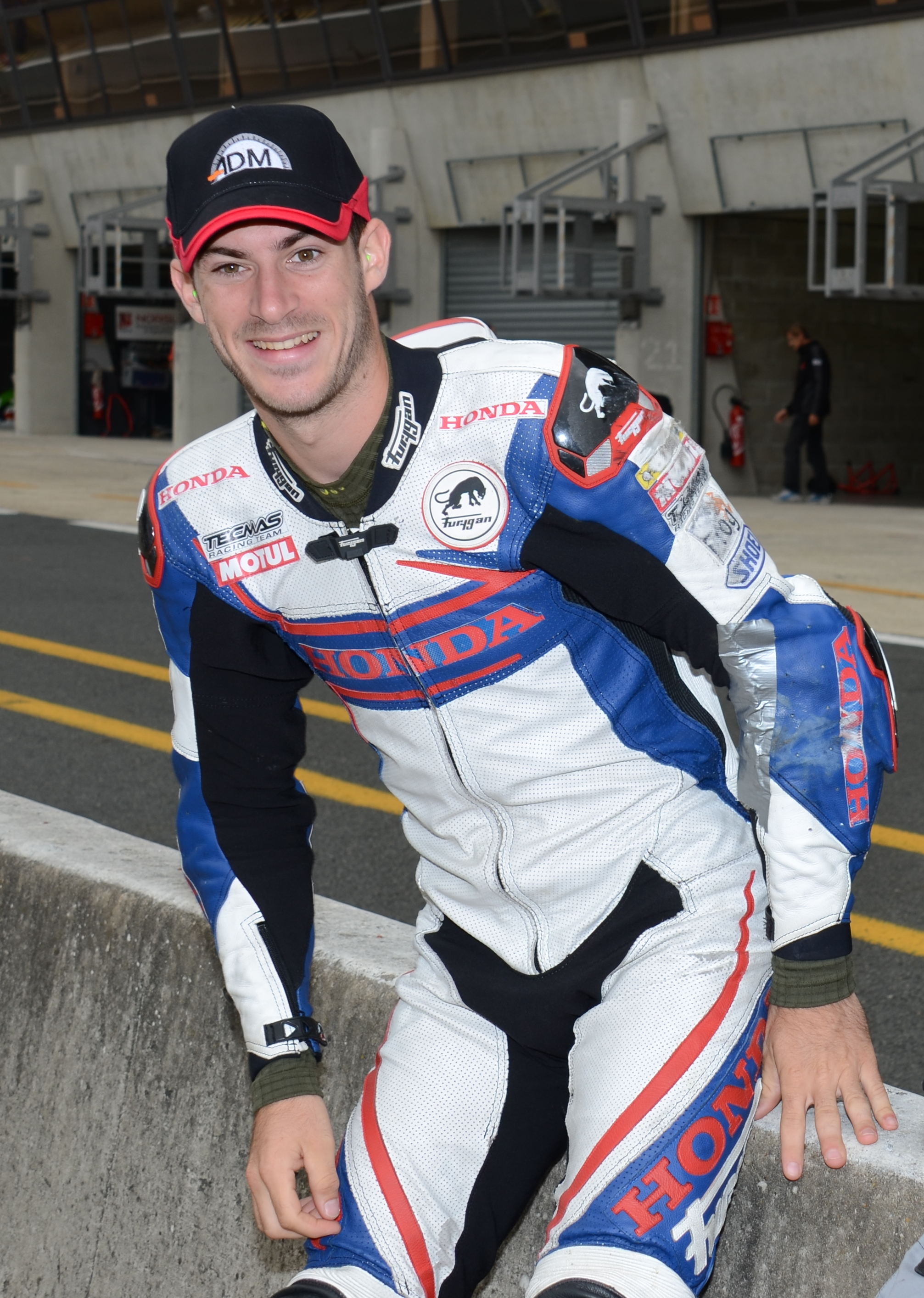
- Debise in 2013
- Nationality: French
- Born: 12 February 1992 (age 34); Albi, France
- Current team: ZXMOTO Factory Evan Bros Racing
- Bike number: 53
Motorcycle racing career statistics
Moto2 World Championship
Active years	2010–2011
Manufacturers	ADV, FTR
Championships	0
2011 championship position	NC (0 pts)
Starts / Wins / Podiums / Poles / F. laps / Points; 34 / 0 / 0 / 0 / 0 / 0
250cc World Championship
Active years	2009
Manufacturers	Aprilia
Championships	0
2009 championship position	21st (18 pts)
Starts / Wins / Podiums / Poles / F. laps / Points; 14 / 0 / 0 / 0 / 0 / 18
125cc World Championship
Active years	2007–2008
Manufacturers	Honda, KTM
Championships	0
2008 championship position	NC (0 pts)
Starts / Wins / Podiums / Poles / F. laps / Points; 0 / 0 / 0 / 0 / 0 / 0
Superbike World Championship
Active years	2020
Manufacturers	Kawasaki
Championships	0
2020 championship position	27th (2 pts)
Starts / Wins / Podiums / Poles / F. laps / Points; 6 / 0 / 0 / 0 / 0 / 2
Supersport World Championship
Active years	2012–2014, 2021–
Manufacturers	Honda, Yamaha, Ducati, ZXMOTO
Championships	0
2025 championship position	5th (200 pts)
Starts / Wins / Podiums / Poles / F. laps / Points; 107 / 8 / 23 / 2 / 10 / 868

Valentin Debise (Born on February 12, 1992, in Albi, France) is a French motorcycle racer, currently competing in the Supersport World Championship for the ZXMOTO Factory Evan Bros Racing racing team with a ZXMOTO 820RR. To date, they have won five regional championships.

Debise has also competed in the MotoAmerica Supersport Championship riding a Suzuki GSX-R600, and the French Supersport Championship, which he won in 2021 and 2022. He finished second in the French Supersport Championship in 2013, and is a former winner of the French 125GP Championship, in 2008. Throughout the 2016 MotoAmerica Series, Debise and his teammates were coached by former AMA racer Ken Hill.

== Career statistics ==
=== FIM Moto2 European Championship ===
==== Races by year ====
(key) (Races in bold indicate pole position) (Races in italics indicate fastest lap)

Year	Bike	1	2	3	4	5	6	7	8	9	10	Pos	Pts
2014	TransFIORmers	JER	ARA1	ARA2	CAT	ALB	NAV1	NAV2	ALG1	ALG2	VAL; 6	24th	10

=== Grand Prix motorcycle racing ===
==== By season ====
Season	Class	Motorcycle	Team	Number	Race	Win	Podium	Pole	FLap	Pts	Plcd
2009	250cc	Honda	CIP Moto – GP250	53	14	0	0	0	0	18	21st
2010	Moto2	ADV	WTR San Marino Team	53	17	0	0	0	0	0	NC
2011	Moto2	FTR	Speed Up	53	17	0	0	0	0	0	NC
Total					**48**	**0**	**0**	**0**	**0**	**18**	

==== Races by year ====
(key) (Races in bold indicate pole position, races in italics indicate fastest lap)

Year	Class	Bike	1	2	3	4	5	6	7	8	9	10	11	12	13	14	15	16	17	Pos	Pts
2007	125cc	Honda	QAT	SPA	TUR	CHN	FRA; DNS	ITA	CAT	GBR	NED	GER	CZE	RSM	POR	JPN	AUS	MAL	VAL	NC	0
2008	125cc	KTM	QAT	SPA	POR	CHN	FRA; DNS	ITA	CAT	GBR	NED	GER	CZE	RSM	IND	JPN	AUS	MAL	VAL	NC	0
2009	250cc	Honda	QAT	JPN	SPA; 20	FRA; 13	ITA; 19	CAT; 17	NED; 14	GER; 20	GBR; 19	CZE; 15	IND; 13	RSM; 14	POR; 13	AUS; 19	MAL; 13	VAL; 15		21st	18
2010	Moto2	ADV	QAT; 24	SPA; 31	FRA; 22	ITA; 23	GBR; 26	NED; 30	CAT; 20	GER; 16	CZE; 32	IND; 18	RSM; 22	ARA; 27	JPN; 26	MAL; 20	AUS; 28	POR; Ret	VAL; Ret	NC	0
2011	Moto2	FTR	QAT; 23	SPA; 30	POR; Ret	FRA; 28	CAT; 20	GBR; 22	NED; Ret	ITA; 18	GER; Ret	CZE; 21	IND; 30	RSM; 25	ARA; 29	JPN; 21	AUS; Ret	MAL; Ret	VAL; Ret	NC	0

=== Supersport World Championship ===
==== Races by year ====
(key) (Races in bold indicate pole position; races in italics indicate fastest lap)

Year	Bike	1	2	3	4	5	6	7	8	9	10	11	12	13	Pos	Pts
2012	Honda	AUS	ITA	NED; Ret	ITA; 23	EUR; 8	SMR; Ret	SPA; Ret	CZE; 14	GBR; DNS	RUS; 18	GER	POR; 18	FRA; Ret	28th	10
2013	Honda	AUS	SPA	NED	ITA	GBR	POR	ITA; DNS	RUS; C	GBR	GER	TUR	FRA	SPA	NC	0
2014	Honda	AUS	SPA	NED	ITA	GBR	MAL	SMR; 16	POR; 14	SPA; 14	FRA; 17	QAT; Ret			28th	4

Year	Bike	1		2		3		4		5		6		7		8		9		10		11		12		Pos	Pts
Year	Bike	R1	R2	R1	R2	R1	R2	R1	R2	R1	R2	R1	R2	R1	R2	R1	R2	R1	R2	R1	R2	R1	R2	R1	R2	Pos	Pts
2021	Yamaha	SPA	SPA	POR	POR	ITA	ITA	NED	NED	CZE; Ret	CZE; 7	SPA	SPA	FRA; Ret	FRA; DNS	SPA	SPA	SPA	SPA	POR	POR	ARG; 6	ARG; 6	INA; DNS	INA; DNS	20th	29
2022	Yamaha	SPA	SPA	NED	NED	POR	POR	ITA	ITA	GBR	GBR	CZE; 4	CZE; 8	FRA; 7	FRA; 4	SPA	SPA	POR	POR	ARG	ARG	INA	INA	AUS	AUS	17th	43
2023	Yamaha	AUS; 13	AUS; 8	INA; 6	INA; Ret	NED; 4	NED; 6	SPA; 8	SPA; 4	EMI	EMI	GBR; 10	GBR; 7	ITA; Ret	ITA; 7	CZE; 11	CZE; 12	FRA; 3	FRA; 2	SPA; 10	SPA; 7	POR; 5	POR; Ret	ARG; 5	ARG; 6	5th	181
2024	Yamaha	AUS; Ret	AUS; 5	SPA; 5	SPA; 5	NED; 3	NED; 18	ITA; 4	ITA; 3	GBR; 5	GBR; 8	CZE; 2	CZE; 4	POR; 6	POR; 3	FRA; 10	FRA; Ret	ITA; 21	ITA; 5	SPA; 3	SPA; 4	POR; Ret	POR; 3	SPA; Ret	SPA; 2	4th	238
2025	Ducati	AUS; 8	AUS; Ret	POR; 8	POR; 5	NED; Ret	NED; 4	ITA; 3	ITA; Ret	CZE; NC	CZE; 5	EMI; 4	EMI; 3	GBR; 9	GBR; 11	HUN; Ret	HUN; 5	FRA; NC	FRA; Ret	ARA; 1	ARA; 3	EST; 1	EST; Ret	SPA; 9	SPA; 8	5th	200
2026	ZXMOTO	AUS; 25	AUS; 24	POR; 1	POR; **1**	NED; 4	NED; 7	HUN; 1	HUN; Ret	CZE; 1	CZE; **1**	ARA; 8	ARA; 8	EMI; 1	EMI; **9**	GBR; 8	GBR; 10	FRA; **3**	FRA; 3	ITA; 4	ITA; 5	EST; 6	EST; 3	SPA; 10	SPA; 5	2nd	308

=== Superbike World Championship ===
==== Races by year ====
Year	Bike	1			2			3			4			5			6			7			8			Pos	Pts
Year	Bike	R1	SR	R2	R1	SR	R2	R1	SR	R2	R1	SR	R2	R1	SR	R2	R1	SR	R2	R1	SR	R2	R1	SR	R2	Pos	Pts
2020	Kawasaki	AUS	AUS	AUS	SPA	SPA	SPA	POR	POR	POR	SPA	SPA	SPA	SPA	SPA	SPA	SPA; 20	SPA; 14	SPA; Ret	FRA; 14	FRA; 16	FRA; 17	POR	POR	POR	27th	2
