= Simone Grotzkyj =

Italian motorcycle racer (born 1988)

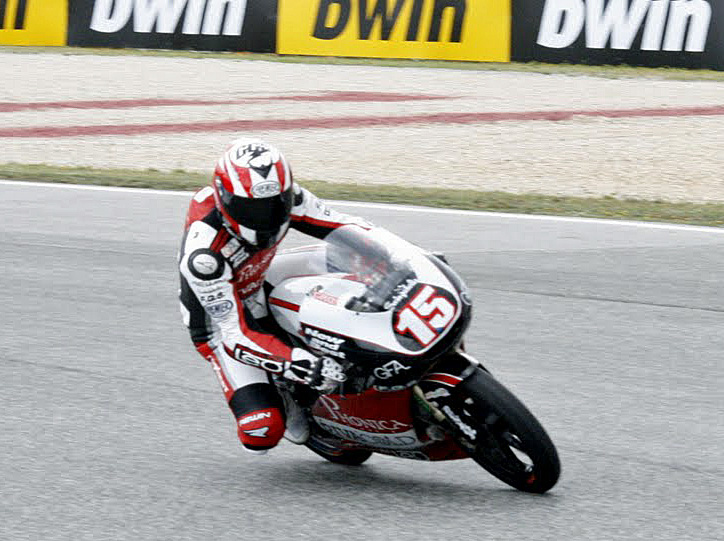
- Grotzkyj at the 2011 Portuguese Grand Prix
- Nationality: Italian
- Born: 28 September 1988 (age 38); Pesaro, Italy
Motorcycle racing career statistics
Moto3 World Championship
| Active years | 2012 |
| Manufacturers | Oral, Suter Honda |
| 2012 championship position | 39th (1 pt) |
Starts / Wins / Podiums / Poles / F. laps / Points; 8 / 0 / 0 / 0 / 0 / 1
250cc World Championship
| Active years | 2008 |
| Manufacturers | Gilera |
| 2008 championship position | 24th (5 pts) |
Starts / Wins / Podiums / Poles / F. laps / Points; 5 / 0 / 0 / 0 / 0 / 5
125cc World Championship
| Active years | 2006-2007, 2010–2011 |
| Manufacturers | Aprilia |
| 2011 championship position | 16th (32 pts) |
Starts / Wins / Podiums / Poles / F. laps / Points; 57 / 0 / 0 / 0 / 0 / 59

Simone Grotzkyj Giorgi (born 28 September 1988 in Pesaro) is an Italian motorcycle racer. He was the CIV 125 GP champion in 2005.

== Career statistics ==
2008 - 36th, European Superstock 600 Championship, Honda CBR600RR
2013 - 20th, FIM Superstock 1000 Cup, Kawasaki ZX-10R
2014 - 19th, FIM Superstock 1000 Cup, Kawasaki ZX-10R

=== CIV Championship (Campionato Italiano Velocita) ===
==== Races by year ====
(key) (Races in bold indicate pole position; races in italics indicate fastest lap)

| Year | Class | Bike | 1 | 2 | 3 | 4 | 5 | 6 | Pos | Pts |
|---|---|---|---|---|---|---|---|---|---|---|
| 2003 | 125cc | Honda | MIS1; 17 | MUG1; 19 | MIS1; 10 | MUG2; 13 | VAL; 13 | | 17th | 12 |
| 2004 | 125cc | Honda | MUG; 21 | IMO; 10 | VAL1; 14 | MIS; 9 | VAL2 | | 16th | 15 |
| 2005 | 125cc | Aprilia | VAL; 3 | MON; 3 | IMO; 3 | MIS1; 2 | MUG; 2 | MIS2; 2 | 1st | 108 |

=== Grand Prix motorcycle racing ===
==== By season ====
| Season | Class | Motorcycle | Team | Number | Race | Win | Podium | Pole | FLap | Pts | Plcd |
|---|---|---|---|---|---|---|---|---|---|---|---|
| 2006 | 125cc | Aprilia | Campetella Racing Junior | 53 | 15 | 0 | 0 | 0 | 0 | 0 | NC |
| 2007 | 125cc | Aprilia | Multimedia Racing | 53 | 17 | 0 | 0 | 0 | 0 | 1 | 29th |
| 2008 | 250cc | Gilera | Campetella Racing | 35 | 5 | 0 | 0 | 0 | 0 | 5 | 29th |
| 2010 | 125cc | Aprilia | Fontana Racing | 15 | 14 | 0 | 0 | 0 | 0 | 26 | 19th |
| 2011 | 125cc | Aprilia | Phonica Racing | 15 | 11 | 0 | 0 | 0 | 0 | 32 | 16th |
| 2012 | Moto3 | Oral | Ambrogio Next Racing | 15 | 8 | 0 | 0 | 0 | 0 | 1 | 39th |
| 2012 | Moto3 | Suter Honda | Ambrogio Next Racing | 15 | 8 | 0 | 0 | 0 | 0 | 1 | 39th |
| Total | | | | | **70** | **0** | **0** | **0** | **0** | **65** | |

==== Races by year ====
(key)

| Year | Class | Bike | 1 | 2 | 3 | 4 | 5 | 6 | 7 | 8 | 9 | 10 | 11 | 12 | 13 | 14 | 15 | 16 | 17 | Pos. | Pts |
|---|---|---|---|---|---|---|---|---|---|---|---|---|---|---|---|---|---|---|---|---|---|
| 2005 | 125cc | Aprilia | SPA | POR | CHN | FRA | ITA; DNS | CAT | NED | GBR | GER | CZE | JPN | MAL | QAT | AUS | TUR | VAL | | NC | 0 |
| 2006 | 125cc | Aprilia | SPA; 31 | QAT; 23 | TUR; 30 | CHN; 24 | FRA; Ret | ITA; 24 | CAT; Ret | NED; 26 | GBR; 24 | GER; Ret | CZE; 29 | MAL; DNS | AUS; 21 | JPN; 16 | POR; Ret | VAL; 28 | | NC | 0 |
| 2007 | 125cc | Aprilia | QAT; Ret | SPA; 15 | TUR; Ret | CHN; 17 | FRA; 18 | ITA; 22 | CAT; Ret | GBR; 17 | NED; 25 | GER; Ret | CZE; 30 | RSM; 28 | POR; 21 | JPN; Ret | AUS; 21 | MAL; 20 | VAL; Ret | 29th | 1 |
| 2008 | 250cc | Gilera | QAT | SPA | POR | CHN | FRA | ITA | CAT | GBR | NED | GER | CZE | RSM; 15 | INP; C | JPN; Ret | AUS; 15 | MAL; 14 | VAL; 15 | 24th | 5 |
| 2010 | 125cc | Aprilia | QAT | SPA | FRA | ITA; 15 | GBR; 14 | NED; 9 | CAT; 12 | GER; Ret | CZE; Ret | INP; 17 | RSM; 14 | ARA; Ret | JPN; 13 | MAL; Ret | AUS; 15 | POR; 12 | VAL; 14 | 19th | 26 |
| 2011 | 125cc | Aprilia | QAT; 14 | SPA; 17 | POR; 10 | FRA; 12 | CAT; 25 | GBR; Ret | NED; 12 | ITA; 13 | GER; 17 | CZE; 8 | INP; 11 | RSM; DNS | ARA | JPN | AUS | MAL | VAL | 16th | 32 |
| 2012 | Moto3 | Oral | QAT; 22 | SPA; Ret | POR; WD | | | | | | | | | | | | | | | 39th | 1 |
| 2012 | Moto3 | Suter Honda | | | | FRA; Ret | CAT; 23 | GBR; 20 | NED; 23 | GER; 15 | ITA; 22 | INP | CZE | RSM | ARA | JPN | MAL | AUS | VAL | 39th | 1 |

=== European Superstock 600 ===
==== Races by year ====
(key) (Races in bold indicate pole position, races in italics indicate fastest lap)

| Year | Bike | 1 | 2 | 3 | 4 | 5 | 6 | 7 | 8 | 9 | 10 | Pos | Pts |
|---|---|---|---|---|---|---|---|---|---|---|---|---|---|
| 2008 | Honda | VAL; Ret | ASS; WD | MNZ; 15 | NÜR; Ret | MIS; 13 | BRN; Ret | BRA; DNS | DON; WD | MAG | POR | 36th | 4 |

=== Superstock 1000 Cup ===
==== Races by year ====
(key) (Races in bold indicate pole position) (Races in italics indicate fastest lap)

| Year | Bike | 1 | 2 | 3 | 4 | 5 | 6 | 7 | 8 | 9 | 10 | Pos | Pts |
|---|---|---|---|---|---|---|---|---|---|---|---|---|---|
| 2013 | Kawasaki | ARA; 18 | NED; 20 | MNZ; 16 | ALG; 17 | IMO; 12 | SIL; 17 | SIL; 16 | NŰR; 13 | MAG; 23 | JER; 14 | 20th | 9 |
| 2014 | Kawasaki | ARA; 7 | NED; 18 | IMO; 15 | MIS; Ret | ALG | JER | MAG | | | | 19th | 10 |
