= Matthieu Lussiana =

French motorcycle racer (born 1988)

- Nationality: French
- Born: 8 September 1988 (age 38); Champigny-sur-Marne, France
- Current team: TEAM ASPI
- Bike number: 94
Motorcycle racing career statistics
125cc World Championship
| Active years | 2005–2006 |
| Manufacturers | Honda |
| 2006 championship position | NC (0 pts) |
Starts / Wins / Podiums / Poles / F. laps / Points; 2 / 0 / 0 / 0 / 0 / 0
Superbike World Championship
| Active years | 2016–2017 |
| Manufacturers | BMW |
| 2017 championship position | NC (0 pts) |
Starts / Wins / Podiums / Poles / F. laps / Points; 10 / 0 / 0 / 0 / 0 / 1

Matthieu Lussiana (born 8 September 1988) is a French motorcycle racer. He currently competes in wildcards in the Superbike World Championship aboard a BMW S1000RR.

== Career statistics ==
=== Career highlights ===
2006 - NC, European Superstock 600 Championship, Yamaha YZF-R6
2008 - 18th, European Superstock 600 Championship, Yamaha YZF-R6
2009 - 31st, FIM Superstock 1000 Cup, Yamaha YZF-R1
2010 - 17th, FIM Superstock 1000 Cup, BMW
2011 - 23rd, FIM Superstock 1000 Cup, BMW S1000RR
2012 - 12th, FIM Superstock 1000 Cup, Kawasaki ZX-10R
2013 - 11th, FIM Superstock 1000 Cup, Kawasaki ZX-10R
2014 - 3rd, FIM Superstock 1000 Cup, Kawasaki ZX-10R
2015 - 28th, FIM Superstock 1000 Cup, Kawasaki ZX-10R

=== Grand Prix motorcycle racing ===
==== By season ====
| Season | Class | Motorcycle | Team | Race | Win | Podium | Pole | FLap | Pts | Plcd |
|---|---|---|---|---|---|---|---|---|---|---|
| 2005 | 125cc | Honda | Equipe de France Espoir | 1 | 0 | 0 | 0 | 0 | 0 | NC |
| 2006 | 125cc | Honda | Villiers Team Competition | 1 | 0 | 0 | 0 | 0 | 0 | NC |
| Total | | | | **2** | **0** | **0** | **0** | **0** | **0** | |

==== Races by year ====
(key)

| Year | Class | Bike | 1 | 2 | 3 | 4 | 5 | 6 | 7 | 8 | 9 | 10 | 11 | 12 | 13 | 14 | 15 | 16 | Pos. | Pts |
|---|---|---|---|---|---|---|---|---|---|---|---|---|---|---|---|---|---|---|---|---|
| 2005 | 125cc | Honda | SPA | POR | CHN | FRA; 18 | ITA | CAT | NED | GBR | GER | CZE | JPN | MAL | QAT | AUS | TUR | VAL | NC | 0 |
| 2006 | 125cc | Honda | SPA | QAT | TUR | CHN | FRA; Ret | ITA | CAT | NED | GBR | GER | CZE | MAL | AUS | JPN | POR | VAL | NC | 0 |

=== European Superstock 600 ===
==== Races by year ====
(key) (Races in bold indicate pole position, races in italics indicate fastest lap)

| Year | Bike | 1 | 2 | 3 | 4 | 5 | 6 | 7 | 8 | 9 | 10 | Pos | Pts |
|---|---|---|---|---|---|---|---|---|---|---|---|---|---|
| 2006 | Yamaha | VAL | MNZ | SIL | MIS | BRN | BRA | ASS | LAU | IMO | MAG; Ret | NC | 0 |
| 2008 | Yamaha | VAL; 18 | ASS; 15 | MNZ; Ret | NÜR; 9 | MIS; Ret | BRN; 11 | BRA; 26 | DON; Ret | MAG; Ret | POR; 9 | 18th | 20 |

=== FIM Superstock 1000 Cup ===
==== Races by year ====
(key) (Races in bold indicate pole position) (Races in italics indicate fastest lap)

| Year | Bike | 1 | 2 | 3 | 4 | 5 | 6 | 7 | 8 | 9 | 10 | Pos | Pts |
|---|---|---|---|---|---|---|---|---|---|---|---|---|---|
| 2009 | Yamaha | VAL; 16 | NED; Ret | MNZ; 16 | SMR; Ret | DON; Ret | BRN; 16 | NŰR; 12 | IMO; Ret | MAG; 18 | ALG; Ret | 31st | 4 |
| 2010 | BMW | ALG; Ret | VAL; Ret | NED; 12 | MNZ; 4 | SMR; Ret | BRN; Ret | SIL; DNS | NŰR; 15 | IMO; Ret | MAG; 14 | 17th | 20 |
| 2011 | BMW | NED; 19 | MNZ; 10 | SMR; Ret | ARA; 17 | BRN; Ret | SIL; 15 | NŰR; Ret | IMO | MAG; Ret | ALG; Ret | 23rd | 7 |
| 2012 | Kawasaki | IMO; DNS | NED; 10 | MNZ; 13 | SMR; 27 | ARA; Ret | BRN; 9 | SIL; Ret | NŰR; 10 | ALG; Ret | MAG; 4 | 12th | 35 |
| 2013 | Kawasaki | ARA | NED; 11 | MNZ; 6 | ALG; 6 | IMO; DSQ | SIL; 8 | SIL; 6 | NŰR; Ret | MAG; 8 | JER; 8 | 11th | 59 |
| 2014 | Kawasaki | ARA; 6 | NED; 3 | IMO; 11 | MIS; 8 | ALG; 2 | JER; Ret | MAG; 1 | | | | 3rd | 84 |
| 2015 | Kawasaki | ARA; Ret | NED; DNS | IMO; Ret | DON; Ret | ALG; 19 | MIS; 13 | JER; 16 | MAG; Ret | | | 28th | 3 |

=== Superbike World Championship ===
==== Races by year ====
| Year | Bike | 1 | | 2 | | 3 | | 4 | | 5 | | 6 | | 7 | | 8 | | 9 | | 10 | | 11 | | 12 | | 13 | | Pos. | Pts |
| Year | Bike | R1 | R2 | R1 | R2 | R1 | R2 | R1 | R2 | R1 | R2 | R1 | R2 | R1 | R2 | R1 | R2 | R1 | R2 | R1 | R2 | R1 | R2 | R1 | R2 | R1 | R2 | Pos. | Pts |
|---|---|---|---|---|---|---|---|---|---|---|---|---|---|---|---|---|---|---|---|---|---|---|---|---|---|---|---|---|---|
| 2016 | BMW | AUS | AUS | THA | THA | SPA; 17 | SPA; 18 | NED; 15 | NED; 17 | ITA | ITA | MAL | MAL | GBR; Ret | GBR; Ret | ITA | ITA | USA | USA | GER | GER | FRA; 20 | FRA; Ret | SPA; Ret | SPA; 17 | QAT | QAT | 35th | 1 |
| 2017 | BMW | AUS | AUS | THA | THA | SPA | SPA | NED | NED | ITA | ITA | GBR | GBR | ITA | ITA | USA | USA | GER | GER | POR | POR | FRA; DNS | FRA; DNS | SPA | SPA | QAT | QAT | NC | 0 |
