= Toshihisa Kuzuhara =

Japanese motorcycle racer

- Nationality: Japanese
- Born: May 23, 1980 (age 46); Tokushima, Japan
Motorcycle racing career statistics
125cc World Championship
Active years	2001–2006
Manufacturers	Honda
Championships	0
2006 championship position	NC (0 pts)
Starts / Wins / Podiums / Poles / F. laps / Points; 20 / 0 / 0 / 0 / 0 / 24

Toshihisa Kuzuhara (葛原 稔永, Kuzuhara Toshihisa; born May 23, 1980) is a Japanese motorcycle racer.

== Career statistics ==
=== Grand Prix motorcycle racing career ===
==== By season ====
Season	Class	Moto	Team	Races	Win	Podiums	Pole	FLap	Pts	Position
2001	125cc	Honda	Kumamoto Racing	1	0	0	0	0	0	NC
2002	125cc	Honda	Honda Kumamoto Racing	2	0	0	0	0	0	NC
2003	125cc	Honda	Honda Kumamoto Racing	2	0	0	0	0	0	NC
2004	125cc	Honda	Angaia Racing	2	0	0	0	0	7	28th
2005	125cc	Honda	Angaia Racing	12	0	0	0	0	17	21st
2006	125cc	Honda	S-way	1	0	0	0	0	0	NC
Total				**20**	**0**	**0**	**0**	**0**	**24**	

==== Races by year ====
(key) (Races in bold indicate pole position, races in italics indicate fastest lap)

Year	Class	Bike	1	2	3	4	5	6	7	8	9	10	11	12	13	14	15	16	Pos.	Pts
2001	125cc	Honda	JPN	RSA	SPA	FRA	ITA	CAT	NED	GBR	GER	CZE	POR	VAL	PAC; 18	AUS	MAL	BRA	NC	0
2002	125cc	Honda	JPN; Ret	RSA	SPA	FRA	ITA	CAT	NED	GBR	GER	CZE	POR	BRA	PAC; Ret	MAL	AUS	VAL	NC	0
2003	125cc	Honda	JPN; 20	RSA	SPA	FRA	ITA	CAT	NED	GBR	GER	CZE	POR	BRA	PAC; Ret	MAL	AUS	VAL	NC	0
2004	125cc	Honda	RSA	SPA	FRA	ITA	CAT	NED	BRA	GER	GBR	CZE	POR	JPN; 10	QAT	MAL; 15	AUS	VAL	28th	7
2005	125cc	Honda	SPA; Ret	POR; 14	CHN; 16	FRA; DNS	ITA; 9	CAT; 21	NED; Ret	GBR; 10	GER; Ret	CZE; DNS	JPN; 14	MAL; Ret	QAT; 27	AUS; 21	TUR	VAL	21st	17
2006	125cc	Honda	SPA	QAT	TUR	CHN	FRA	ITA	CAT	NED	GBR	GER	CZE	MAL	AUS	JPN; 30	POR	VAL	NC	0
