= Federico Sandi =

Italian motorcycle racer

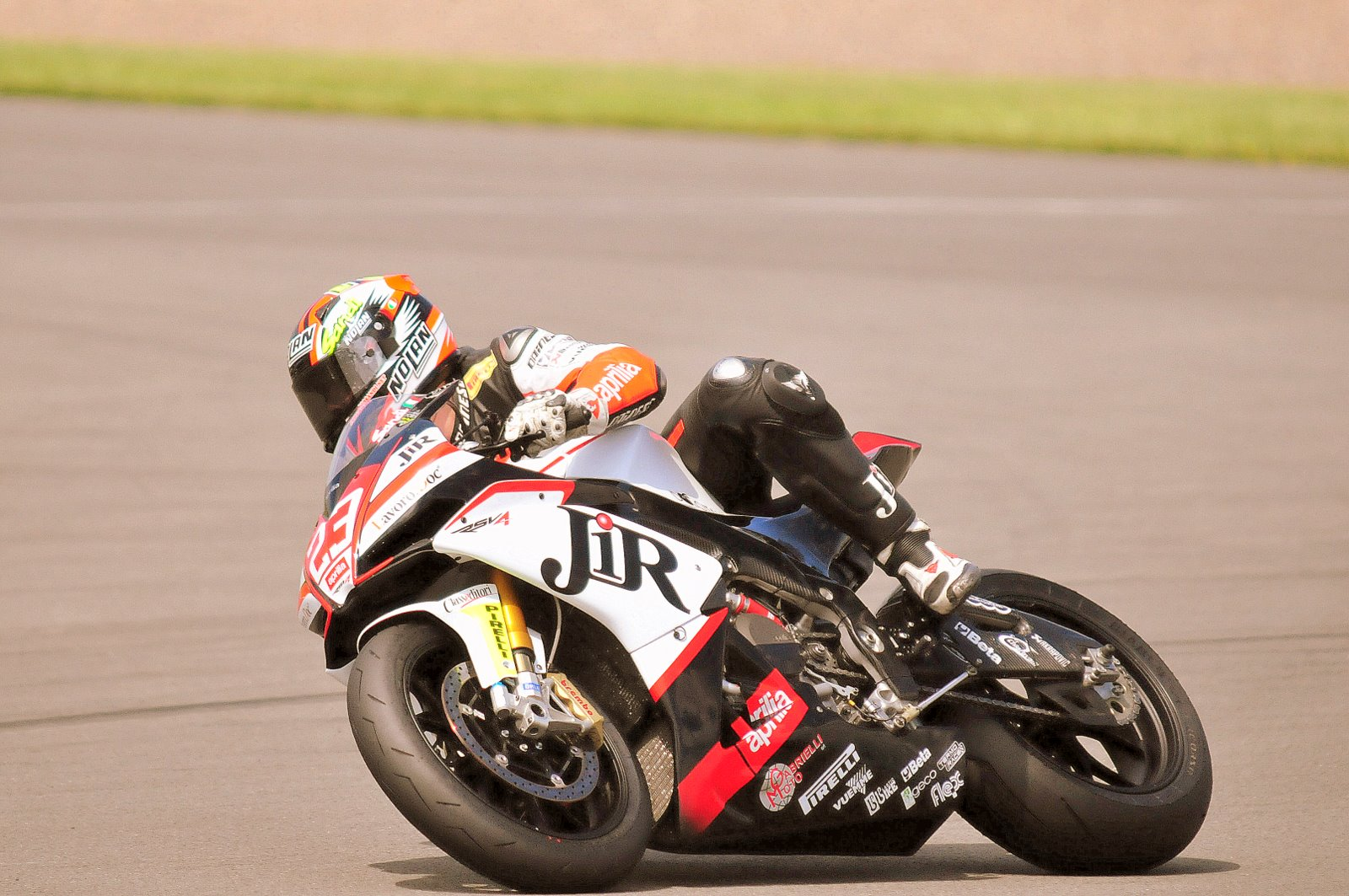
- Sandi on an Aprilia RSV4.
- Nationality: Italian
- Born: 12 August 1989 (age 37); Voghera, Italy
- Current team: MOTOCORSA Racing
- Bike number: 23
Motorcycle racing career statistics
250cc World Championship
| Active years | 2007–2008 |
| Manufacturers | Aprilia |
Starts / Wins / Podiums / Poles / F. laps / Points; 10 / 0 / 0 / 0 / 0 / 6
125cc World Championship
| Active years | 2005–2007 |
| Manufacturers | Honda, Aprilia |
Starts / Wins / Podiums / Poles / F. laps / Points; 45 / 0 / 0 / 0 / 0 / 4
Superbike World Championship
| Active years | 2010–2013 |
| Manufacturers | Aprilia, Ducati, BMW, Kawasaki |
Starts / Wins / Podiums / Poles / F. laps / Points; 35 / 0 / 0 / 0 / 0 / 65

Federico Sandi (born 12 August 1989 in Voghera) is an Italian motorcycle racer. He competes in the European Superstock 1000 Championship aboard a Ducati 1199 Panigale. He has competed at international level in the 125cc World Championship, the 250cc World Championship and the Superbike World Championship.

== Career statistics ==
- 2009 - 19th, FIM Superstock 1000 Cup, Aprilia RSV4
- 2012 - NC, FIM Superstock 1000 Cup, Ducati 1098R
- 2014 - 16th, FIM Superstock 1000 Cup, BMW S1000RR
- 2016 - 38th, FIM Superstock 1000 Cup, Yamaha YZF-R1
- 2017 - 12th, European Superstock 1000 Championship, BMW S1000RR
- 2018 - 4th, European Superstock 1000 Championship, Ducati 1199 Panigale

=== Grand Prix motorcycle racing ===
==== By season ====
| Season | Class | Motorcycle | Team | Number | Race | Win | Podium | Pole | FLap | Pts | Plcd |
|---|---|---|---|---|---|---|---|---|---|---|---|
| 2005 | 125cc | Honda | Angaia Racing | 10 | 16 | 0 | 0 | 0 | 0 | 0 | NC |
| 2006 | 125cc | Aprilia | SSM Racing | 12 | 15 | 0 | 0 | 0 | 0 | 4 | 27th |
| 2007 | 125cc | Aprilia | Skilled Racing Team | 15 | 14 | 0 | 0 | 0 | 0 | 0 | NC |
| 2007 | 250cc | Aprilia | Team Sicilia | 21 | 3 | 0 | 0 | 0 | 0 | 0 | NC |
| 2008 | 250cc | Aprilia | Zongshen Team of China | 90 | 7 | 0 | 0 | 0 | 0 | 6 | 22nd |
| 2008 | 250cc | Aprilia | Matteoni Racing | 90 | 7 | 0 | 0 | 0 | 0 | 6 | 22nd |
| Total | | | | | **55** | **0** | **0** | **0** | **0** | **10** | |

==== Races by year ====
(key)

| Year | Class | Bike | 1 | 2 | 3 | 4 | 5 | 6 | 7 | 8 | 9 | 10 | 11 | 12 | 13 | 14 | 15 | 16 | 17 | Pos. | Pts |
|---|---|---|---|---|---|---|---|---|---|---|---|---|---|---|---|---|---|---|---|---|---|
| 2005 | 125cc | Honda | SPA; 18 | POR; 27 | CHN; 25 | FRA; 19 | ITA; Ret | CAT; 18 | NED; Ret | GBR; 19 | GER; Ret | CZE; Ret | JPN; 23 | MAL; Ret | QAT; 26 | AUS; Ret | TUR; Ret | VAL; Ret | | NC | 0 |
| 2006 | 125cc | Aprilia | SPA; 14 | QAT; Ret | TUR; 35 | CHN; 23 | FRA; DNQ | ITA; Ret | CAT; 22 | NED; Ret | GBR; 23 | GER; 22 | CZE; Ret | MAL; 16 | AUS; Ret | JPN; Ret | POR; 14 | VAL; 22 | | 27th | 4 |
| 2007 | 125cc | Aprilia | QAT; Ret | SPA; Ret | TUR; 19 | CHN; Ret | FRA; 26 | ITA; 18 | CAT; 21 | GBR; Ret | NED; 24 | GER; 23 | CZE; 19 | RSM; Ret | POR; 19 | JPN; Ret | | | | NC | 0 |
| 2007 | 250cc | Aprilia | | | | | | | | | | | | | | | AUS; 20 | MAL; Ret | VAL; 20 | NC | 0 |
| 2008 | 250cc | Aprilia | QAT | SPA | POR; 14 | CHN | FRA; 17 | ITA | CAT | GBR | NED | GER; Ret | CZE; 18 | RSM; 12 | INP | JPN | AUS; Ret | MAL | VAL; 18 | 22nd | 6 |

=== FIM Superstock 1000 Cup ===
==== Races by year ====
(key) (Races in bold indicate pole position) (Races in italics indicate fastest lap)

| Year | Bike | 1 | 2 | 3 | 4 | 5 | 6 | 7 | 8 | 9 | 10 | Pos | Pts |
|---|---|---|---|---|---|---|---|---|---|---|---|---|---|
| 2009 | Aprilia | VAL; DNS | NED; 29 | MNZ; 8 | SMR; 26 | DON; Ret | BRN; 12 | NŰR; Ret | IMO; DSQ | MAG; 21 | ALG; 13 | 19th | 15 |
| 2012 | Kawasaki | IMO; DNS | NED; Ret | MNZ | SMR | ARA | BRN | SIL | NŰR | ALG | MAG; 22 | NC | 0 |
| 2014 | BMW | ARA | NED | IMO | MIS; Ret | ALG; 13 | JER; 14 | MAG; 5 | | | | 16th | 16 |
| 2016 | Yamaha | ARA | NED | IMO | DON | MIS; 11 | LAU; Ret | MAG; Ret | JER; Ret | | | 38th | 1 |

=== European Superstock 1000 Championship ===
==== Races by year ====
(key) (Races in bold indicate pole position) (Races in italics indicate fastest lap)

| Year | Bike | 1 | 2 | 3 | 4 | 5 | 6 | 7 | 8 | 9 | Pos | Pts |
|---|---|---|---|---|---|---|---|---|---|---|---|---|
| 2017 | BMW | ARA; Ret | NED; 11 | IMO; DSQ | DON; 5 | MIS; Ret | LAU; 5 | ALG; Ret | MAG; 3 | JER; 7 | 12th | 52 |
| 2018 | Ducati | ARA; 3 | NED; 4 | IMO; 4 | DON; 6 | BRN; 5 | ALG; 2 | MAG; 1 | | | 4th | 117 |

=== Superbike World Championship ===
==== Races by year ====
| Year | Make | 1 | | 2 | | 3 | | 4 | | 5 | | 6 | | 7 | | 8 | | 9 | | 10 | | 11 | | 12 | | 13 | | 14 | | Pos. | Pts |
| Year | Make | R1 | R2 | R1 | R2 | R1 | R2 | R1 | R2 | R1 | R2 | R1 | R2 | R1 | R2 | R1 | R2 | R1 | R2 | R1 | R2 | R1 | R2 | R1 | R2 | R1 | R2 | R1 | R2 | Pos. | Pts |
|---|---|---|---|---|---|---|---|---|---|---|---|---|---|---|---|---|---|---|---|---|---|---|---|---|---|---|---|---|---|---|---|
| 2010 | Aprilia | AUS | AUS | POR | POR | SPA | SPA | NED | NED | ITA | ITA | RSA | RSA | USA | USA | SMR; 18 | SMR; 20 | CZE | CZE | GBR | GBR | GER | GER | ITA; 16 | ITA; 13 | FRA | FRA | | | 25th | 3 |
| 2011 | Ducati | AUS | AUS | EUR | EUR | NED | NED | ITA | ITA | USA | USA | SMR | SMR | SPA | SPA | CZE | CZE | GBR | GBR | GER | GER | ITA; 13 | ITA; 12 | FRA | FRA | POR | POR | | | 26th | 7 |
| 2012 | BMW | AUS | AUS | ITA | ITA | NED | NED | ITA | ITA | EUR | EUR | USA | USA | SMR; 20 | SMR; 17 | SPA | SPA | CZE | CZE | GBR | GBR | RUS | RUS | GER | GER | POR | POR | FRA | FRA | NC | 0 |
| 2013 | Kawasaki | AUS; 16 | AUS; 14 | SPA; 12 | SPA; Ret | NED; 16 | NED; 14 | ITA; 15 | ITA; 13 | GBR; Ret | GBR; 14 | POR; 10 | POR; 13 | ITA; 13 | ITA; 14 | RUS; 11 | RUS; C | GBR; 16 | GBR; 13 | GER; Ret | GER; Ret | TUR; 11 | TUR; 12 | USA; 14 | USA; Ret | FRA; 12 | FRA; 13 | SPA; 16 | SPA; 15 | 17th | 55 |
