= 2011 Magny-Cours Superbike World Championship round =

2011 motorcycle race

(France) 2011 Magny-Cours Superbike World Championship round
Round details
- Round 12 of 13 rounds in the 2011 Superbike World Championship. and Round 11 of 12 rounds in the 2011 Supersport World Championship.
- Date: October 2, 2011
- Location: Circuit de Nevers Magny-Cours
- Course: Permanent racing facility 4.411 km (2.741 mi)

Superbike World Championship
Pole position
(United Kingdom) Jonathan Rea
1:37.490
Fastest lap race 1	Fastest lap race 2
(Spain) Carlos Checa	(Spain) Carlos Checa
1:38.643	1:39.136

Supersport World Championship
Pole position
(Australia) Broc Parkes
1:41.395
Fastest lap
(Italy) Massimo Roccoli
1:42.507

The 2011 Magny-Cours Superbike World Championship round was the twelfth round of the 2011 Superbike World Championship. It took place on the weekend of September 30 and October 1–2, 2011 at Circuit de Nevers Magny-Cours, France.

Carlos Checa became 2011 Superbike World Champion after winning Race 1, while Ducati claimed the Manufacturers' Championship after Race 2. In Supersport, Chaz Davies, who finishing sixth in the race, secured his title with one round remaining.

== Results ==
=== Superbike race 1 classification ===
Pos.	No.	Rider	Bike	Laps	Time/Retired	Grid	Points
1	7	(Spain) Carlos Checa	Ducati 1098R	23	38:16.465	3	25
2	33	(Italy) Marco Melandri	Yamaha YZF-R1	23	+2.201	8	20
3	91	(United Kingdom) Leon Haslam	BMW S1000RR	23	+3.218	7	16
4	2	(United Kingdom) Leon Camier	Aprilia RSV4 Factory	23	+3.796	4	13
5	58	(Republic of Ireland) Eugene Laverty	Yamaha YZF-R1	23	+5.602	2	11
6	50	(France) Sylvain Guintoli	Ducati 1098R	23	+9.634	5	10
7	41	(Japan) Noriyuki Haga	Aprilia RSV4 Factory	23	+9.814	9	9
8	17	(Spain) Joan Lascorz	Kawasaki ZX-10R	23	+11.387	10	8
9	11	(Australia) Troy Corser	BMW S1000RR	23	+17.143	12	7
10	66	(United Kingdom) Tom Sykes	Kawasaki ZX-10R	23	+24.523	6	6
11	112	(Spain) Javier Forés	BMW S1000RR	23	+34.532	17	5
12	84	(Italy) Michel Fabrizio	Suzuki GSX-R1000	23	+1:19.742	14	4
13	44	(Italy) Roberto Rolfo	Kawasaki ZX-10R	22	+1 lap	18	3
Ret	121	(France) Maxime Berger	Ducati 1098R	10	Retirement	11	
Ret	4	(United Kingdom) Jonathan Rea	Honda CBR1000RR	4	Accident	1	
Ret	86	(Italy) Ayrton Badovini	BMW S1000RR	4	Technical problem	16	
Ret	96	(Czech Republic) Jakub Smrž	Ducati 1098R	2	Accident	13	
Ret	8	(Australia) Mark Aitchison	Kawasaki ZX-10R	0	Accident	15	
WD	111	(Spain) Rubén Xaus	Honda CBR1000RR		Injury in practice		
OFFICIAL SUPERBIKE RACE 1 REPORT

=== Superbike race 2 classification ===
Pos.	No.	Rider	Bike	Laps	Time/Retired	Grid	Points
1	7	(Spain) Carlos Checa	Ducati 1098R	23	38:17.851	3	25
2	33	(Italy) Marco Melandri	Yamaha YZF-R1	23	+1.267	8	20
3	58	(Republic of Ireland) Eugene Laverty	Yamaha YZF-R1	23	+2.043	2	16
4	91	(United Kingdom) Leon Haslam	BMW S1000RR	23	+6.506	7	13
5	50	(France) Sylvain Guintoli	Ducati 1098R	23	+7.843	5	11
6	2	(United Kingdom) Leon Camier	Aprilia RSV4 Factory	23	+8.360	4	10
7	17	(Spain) Joan Lascorz	Kawasaki ZX-10R	23	+15.285	10	9
8	86	(Italy) Ayrton Badovini	BMW S1000RR	23	+15.549	15	8
9	11	(Australia) Troy Corser	BMW S1000RR	23	+16.278	12	7
10	41	(Japan) Noriyuki Haga	Aprilia RSV4 Factory	23	+22.996	9	6
11	112	(Spain) Javier Forés	BMW S1000RR	23	+43.132	16	5
12	121	(France) Maxime Berger	Ducati 1098R	23	+47.846	11	4
Ret	44	(Italy) Roberto Rolfo	Kawasaki ZX-10R	19	Accident	17	
Ret	4	(United Kingdom) Jonathan Rea	Honda CBR1000RR	13	Technical problem	1	
Ret	8	(Australia) Mark Aitchison	Kawasaki ZX-10R	4	Retirement	14	
Ret	84	(Italy) Michel Fabrizio	Suzuki GSX-R1000	2	Accident	13	
Ret	66	(United Kingdom) Tom Sykes	Kawasaki ZX-10R	0	Accident	6	
DNS	96	(Czech Republic) Jakub Smrž	Ducati 1098R		Did not start		
WD	111	(Spain) Rubén Xaus	Honda CBR1000RR		Injury in practice		
OFFICIAL SUPERBIKE RACE 2 REPORT

=== Supersport race classification ===
Pos.	No.	Rider	Bike	Laps	Time/Retired	Grid	Points
1	9	(Italy) Luca Scassa	Yamaha YZF-R6	22	37:48.052	2	25
2	11	(United Kingdom) Sam Lowes	Honda CBR600RR	22	+1.582	4	20
3	23	(Australia) Broc Parkes	Kawasaki ZX-6R	22	+1.749	1	16
4	44	(Spain) David Salom	Kawasaki ZX-6R	22	+1.826	6	13
5	77	(United Kingdom) James Ellison	Honda CBR600RR	22	+2.384	5	11
6	7	(United Kingdom) Chaz Davies	Yamaha YZF-R6	22	+5.212	8	10
7	22	(Italy) Roberto Tamburini	Yamaha YZF-R6	22	+9.755	9	9
8	99	(France) Fabien Foret	Honda CBR600RR	22	+11.268	7	8
9	21	(France) Florian Marino	Honda CBR600RR	22	+18.290	11	7
10	34	(South Africa) Ronan Quarmby	Triumph Daytona 675	22	+26.735	10	6
11	38	(Hungary) Balázs Németh	Honda CBR600RR	22	+38.714	16	5
12	31	(Italy) Vittorio Iannuzzo	Kawasaki ZX-6R	22	+39.412	14	4
13	117	(Portugal) Miguel Praia	Honda CBR600RR	22	+39.711	15	3
14	5	(Sweden) Alexander Lundh	Honda CBR600RR	22	+39.927	12	2
15	15	(France) Louis Bulle	Yamaha YZF-R6	22	+42.537	18	1
16	69	(Czech Republic) Ondřej Ježek	Honda CBR600RR	22	+46.457	21	
17	28	(Poland) Paweł Szkopek	Honda CBR600RR	22	+47.029	19	
18	17	(Czech Republic) Patrik Vostárek	Honda CBR600RR	22	+48.143	25	
19	125	(Italy) Danilo Marrancone	Yamaha YZF-R6	22	+51.348	22	
20	10	(Hungary) Imre Tóth	Honda CBR600RR	22	+1:06.402	20	
21	25	(Slovenia) Marko Jerman	Triumph Daytona 675	22	+1:11.567	26	
22	4	(United Kingdom) Gino Rea	Honda CBR600RR	22	+1:36.545	13	
23	45	(Romania) Cătălin Cazacu	Honda CBR600RR	21	+1 lap	27	
24	30	(Switzerland) Thomas Caiani	Honda CBR600RR	21	+1 lap	28	
25	24	(Russia) Eduard Blokhin	Yamaha YZF-R6	21	+1 lap	29	
26	73	(Russia) Oleg Pozdneev	Yamaha YZF-R6	21	+1 lap	30	
Ret	70	(Finland) Pauli Pekkanen	Triumph Daytona 675	20	Retirement	24	
Ret	91	(Italy) Danilo Dell'Omo	Triumph Daytona 675	17	Technical problem	17	
Ret	8	(Switzerland) Bastien Chesaux	Honda CBR600RR	13	Accident	23	
Ret	55	(Italy) Massimo Roccoli	Kawasaki ZX-6R	3	Technical problem	3	
DNS	127	(Denmark) Robbin Harms	Honda CBR600RR		Did not start		
DNS	40	(United Kingdom) Martin Jessopp	Honda CBR600RR		Did not start		
DNQ	19	(Australia) Mitchell Pirotta	Honda CBR600RR		Did not qualify		
OFFICIAL SUPERSPORT RACE REPORT

=== Superstock 1000 classification ===
Pos.	No.	Rider	Bike	Laps	Time/Retired	Grid	Points
1	9	(Italy) Danilo Petrucci	Ducati 1098R	14	23:48.111	1	25
2	87	(Italy) Lorenzo Zanetti	BMW S1000RR	14	+2.734	4	20
3	20	(France) Sylvain Barrier	BMW S1000RR	14	+2.801	5	16
4	59	(Italy) Niccolò Canepa	Ducati 1098R	14	+2.997	3	13
5	34	(Italy) Davide Giugliano	Ducati 1098R	14	+11.455	2	11
6	15	(Italy) Fabio Massei	BMW S1000RR	14	+11.817	11	10
7	8	(Italy) Andrea Antonelli	Honda CBR1000RR	14	+11.956	9	9
8	32	(South Africa) Sheridan Morais	Kawasaki ZX-10R	14	+14.026	10	8
9	5	(Italy) Marco Bussolotti	Kawasaki ZX-10R	14	+17.193	12	7
10	6	(Italy) Lorenzo Zanetti	Kawasaki ZX-10R	14	+17.351	7	6
11	67	(Australia) Bryan Staring	Kawasaki ZX-10R	14	+17.388	13	5
12	33	(Switzerland) Michaël Savary	BMW S1000RR	14	+21.854	22	4
13	17	(Canada) Brett McCormick	BMW S1000RR	14	+22.252	19	3
14	21	(Germany) Markus Reiterberger	BMW S1000RR	14	+22.666	16	2
15	36	(Argentina) Leandro Mercado	Kawasaki ZX-10R	14	+22.893	14	1
16	55	(Slovakia) Tomáš Svitok	Ducati 1098R	14	+24.417	20	
17	11	(France) Jérémy Guarnoni	Yamaha YZF-R1	14	+28.034	17	
18	7	(Spain) Dani Rivas	Kawasaki ZX-10R	14	+32.015	18	
19	74	(United Kingdom) Kieran Clarke	Honda CBR1000RR	14	+33.711	25	
20	31	(Sweden) Christoffer Bergman	Kawasaki ZX-10R	14	+35.498	21	
21	39	(France) Randy Pagaud	BMW S1000RR	14	+42.516	24	
22	70	(France) Romain Maitre	Kawasaki ZX-10R	14	+45.044	26	
23	40	(Hungary) Alen Győrfi	Honda CBR1000RR	14	+45.180	28	
24	71	(Netherlands) Roy Ten Napel	Honda CBR1000RR	14	+1:19.378	27	
25	86	(Australia) Beau Beaton	BMW S1000RR	12	+2 lap	23	
Ret	65	(France) Loris Baz	Honda CBR1000RR	7	Technical Problem	8	
Ret	93	(France) Mathieu Lussiana	BMW S1000RR	4	Retirement	15	
Ret	30	(Romania) Bogdan Vrăjitoru	Yamaha YZF-R1	3	Accident	29	
Ret	14	(Italy) Lorenzo Baroni	Ducati 1098R	1	Retirement	6	
DNS	107	(Italy) Niccolò Rosso	Kawasaki ZX-10R		Did not start		
WD	47	(Italy) Eddi La Marra	Honda CBR1000RR		Withdrew		
OFFICIAL SUPERSTOCK 1000 RACE REPORT

=== Superstock 600 classification ===
Pos.	No.	Rider	Bike	Laps	Time/Retired	Grid	Points
1	60	(Netherlands) Michael Van Der Mark	Honda CBR600RR	12	21:05.878	4	25
2	3	(Australia) Jed Metcher	Yamaha YZF-R6	12	+1.699	5	20
3	4	(United States) Joshua Day	Kawasaki ZX-6R	12	+1.743	1	16
4	99	(Netherlands) Tony Coveña	Yamaha YZF-R6	12	+8.642	16	13
5	74	(Switzerland) Robin Mulhauser	Yamaha YZF-R6	12	+8.997	9	11
6	29	(Italy) Daniele Beretta	Yamaha YZF-R6	12	+11.345	13	10
7	88	(France) Mathieu Marchal	Yamaha YZF-R6	12	+17.331	15	9
8	75	(Italy) Francesco Cocco	Yamaha YZF-R6	12	+19.447	14	8
9	97	(France) Gregory Di Carlo	Yamaha YZF-R6	12	+19.925	18	7
10	26	(Romania) Mircea Vrajitoru	Yamaha YZF-R6	12	+25.727	19	6
11	92	(Australia) Adrian Nestorovic	Yamaha YZF-R6	12	+25.919	24	5
12	39	(Switzerland) Sébastien Suchet	Honda CBR600RR	12	+29.341	28	4
13	25	(Italy) Federico Monti	Yamaha YZF-R6	12	+30.073	31	3
14	10	(Spain) Nacho Calero	Yamaha YZF-R6	12	+30.395	22	2
15	15	(France) Kevin Szalai	Yamaha YZF-R6	12	+30.740	26	1
16	8	(United Kingdom) Joshua Elliott	Yamaha YZF-R6	12	+31.593	25	
17	49	(France) Maxime Cudeville	Yamaha YZF-R6	12	+33.485	23	
18	52	(Belgium) Gauthier Duwelz	Yamaha YZF-R6	12	+42.718	11	
19	14	(France) Jonathan Martinez	Triumph Daytona 675	12	+45.250	27	
20	98	(France) Romain Lanusse	Yamaha YZF-R6	12	+46.850	3	
21	78	(Netherlands) Tristan Lentink	Honda CBR600RR	12	+51.304	32	
22	23	(Luxembourg) Christophe Ponsson	Yamaha YZF-R6	12	+51.956	21	
23	59	(Denmark) Alex Schacht	Honda CBR600RR	12	+56.391	17	
24	76	(France) Clive Rambure	Yamaha YZF-R6	12	+1:01.474	29	
25	18	(Italy) Christian Gamarino	Kawasaki ZX-6R	11	+1 lap	12	
26	27	(Germany) Marvin Fritz	Kawasaki ZX-6R	11	+1 lap	30	
Ret	84	(Italy) Riccardo Russo	Yamaha YZF-R6	9	Accident	6	
Ret	64	(Italy) Riccardo Cecchini	Triumph Daytona 675	6	Accident	20	
Ret	28	(Switzerland) Bryan Leu	Honda CBR600RR	4	Accident	33	
Ret	43	(France) Stéphane Egea	Yamaha YZF-R6	3	Technical	7	
Ret	13	(Italy) Dino Lombardi	Yamaha YZF-R6	2	Accident	2	
Ret	6	(France) Richard De Tournay	Yamaha YZF-R6	2	Accident	8	
Ret	19	(Slovakia) Tomáš Krajči	Yamaha YZF-R6	0	Accident	10	
OFFICIAL SUPERSTOCK 600 RACE REPORT
