= Martín Cárdenas (motorcyclist) =

Colombian motorcycle racer

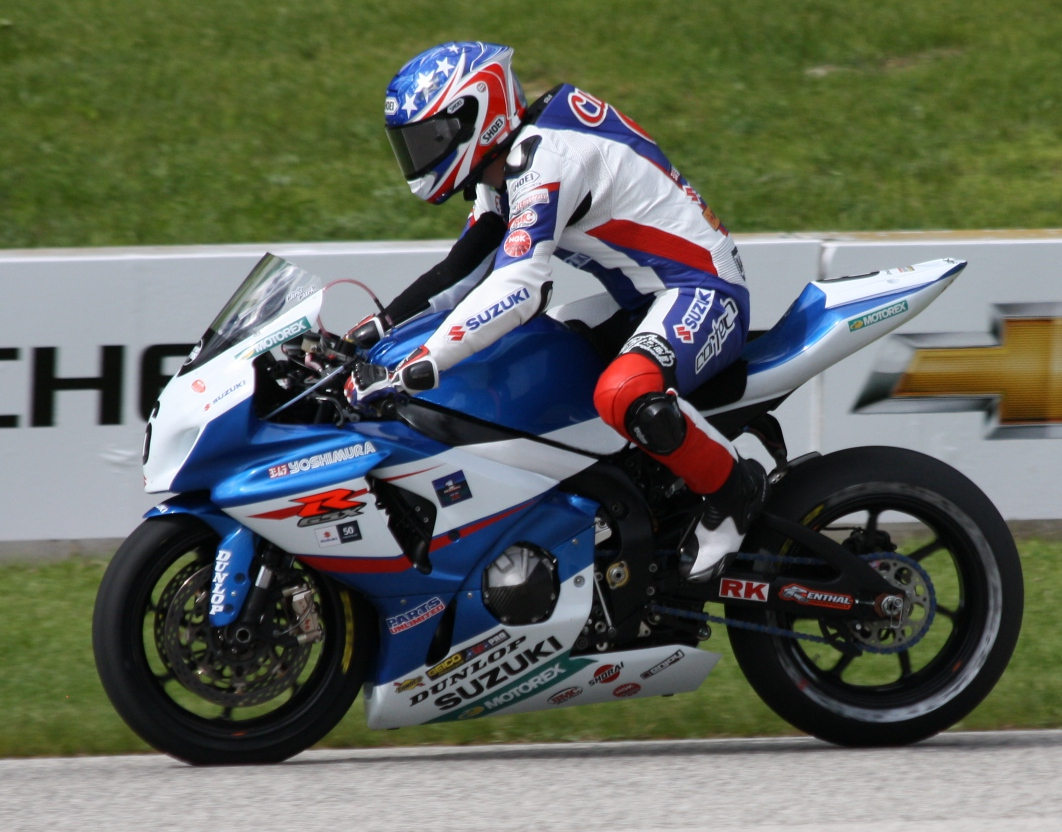
- Cárdenas riding in 2013
- Nationality: Colombian
- Born: 28 January 1982 (age 44); Medellín, Colombia
Motorcycle racing career statistics
Moto2 World Championship
Active years	2011
Manufacturers	FTR
Championships	0
2011 championship position	NC (0 pts)
Starts / Wins / Podiums / Poles / F. laps / Points; 1 / 0 / 0 / 0 / 0 / 0
250cc World Championship
Active years	2005–2006
Manufacturers	Honda, Aprilia
Championships	0
2006 championship position	15th (37 pts)
Starts / Wins / Podiums / Poles / F. laps / Points; 25 / 0 / 0 / 0 / 0 / 46

Martín Cárdenas Ochoa (born 28 January 1982) is a Colombian professional motorcycle road racer.

== Career statistics ==
=== All-time statistics ===
Year	Series		Poles	Races	Podiums	Wins	2nd place	3rd place	Titles
All-time	AMA Daytona Sportbike		1	38	23	16	1	6	1
All-time	AMA Formula Xtreme		0	0	0	0	0	0	0
All-time	AMA Supersport		0	0	0	0	0	0	0
All-time	AMA Superstock		0	0	0	0	0	0	0
All-time	AMA Superbike		0	0	0	0	0	0	0
All-time	250cc		0	0	0	0	0	0	0
CEV Supersport 2003	Series CEV Supersport ROZAS RACING	Bike yamaha	Poles	Races	Podiums 1	Wins 1	2nd place 1	3rd place 1	Position Overall 7
CEV Supersport 2004	Series CEV Supersport ROZAS RACING	Bike yamaha	Poles	Races	Podiums 5	Wins 3	2nd place 1	3rd place 1	Position Overall 1 championship winner
2010	AMA Daytona Sportbike	Suzuki GSX-R600	0	18	13	9	1	3	1st
2009	AMA Daytona Sportbike	Suzuki GSX-R600	1	20	10	7	0	3	3rd

=== AMA Formula Xtreme Championship ===
==== By year ====
Year	Class	Bike	1	2	3	4	5	6	7	8	9	10	11	Pos	Pts
2007	Formula Xtreme	Suzuki	DAY	BAR	FON	INF	RAM; 3	MIL; 5	LAG	OHI; Ret	VIR; 5	RAT; 5	LAG; 4	13th	134

=== AMA Supersport Championship ===
Year	Class	Bike	1	2	3	4	5	6	7	8	9	10	11	Pos	Pts
2007	Supersport	Suzuki	DAY	BAR	FON	INF; 12	RAM; Ret	MIL; 3	LAG; 7	OHI	VIR; 2	RAT; 4	LAG; 3	11th	160

=== AMA SuperBike Championship ===
Year	Class	Team	1		2		3	4		5		6		7	8		Pos	Pts
Year	Class	Team	R1	R2	R1	R2	R1	R1	R2	R1	R2	R1	R2	R1	R1	R2	Pos	Pts
2011	SuperBike	Suzuki	DAY; 6	DAY; 4	INF; 3	INF; 8	UTA; Ret	RAM; 4	RAM; 4	BAR; 1	BAR; 3	MOH; 5	MOH; 5	LAG; 8	NJE; 8	NJE; 4	4th	231

=== Grand Prix motorcycle racing ===
==== By season ====
Year	Class	Motorcycle	Team	Number	Race	Win	Pod	Pole	FLap	Pts	Plcd	WCh
2005	250cc	Aprilia RS250	Aprilia Germany	36	14	0	0	0	0	9	25th	–
2006	250cc	Honda RS250RW	Wurth Honda BQR	36	7	0	0	0	0	37	15th	-
2006	250cc	Honda RS250RW	Repsol Honda	36	4	0	0	0	0	37	15th	-
2011	Moto2	FTR Moto M211	Blusens-STX	10	1	0	0	0	0	0	NC	–
Total					**26**	**0**	**0**	**0**	**0**	**46**		**0**

==== By class ====
Class	Seasons	1st GP	1st Pod	1st Win	Race	Win	Podiums	Pole	FLap	Pts	WChmp
250cc	2005–2006	2005 Spain			25	0	0	0	0	46	0
Moto2	2011	2011 Indianapolis			1	0	0	0	0	0	0
Total	2005–2006, 2011				**26**	**0**	**0**	**0**	**0**	**46**	**0**

==== Races by year ====
(key) (Races in bold indicate pole position) (Races in italics indicate fastest lap)

Year	Class	Bike	1	2	3	4	5	6	7	8	9	10	11	12	13	14	15	16	17	Pos	Pts
2005	250cc	Aprilia	SPA; Ret	POR; 15	CHN; DNS	FRA	ITA; 17	CAT; 17	NED; 21	GBR; Ret	GER; 15	CZE; 19	JPN; 17	MAL; 15	QAT; 13	AUS; 17	TUR; Ret	VAL; 13		25th	9
2006	250cc	Honda	SPA; 8	QAT; 11	TUR; 13	CHN; 13	FRA; 13	ITA; Ret	CAT; 10	NED; Ret	GBR	GER; Ret	CZE; 7	MAL; Ret	AUS; WD	JPN	POR	VAL		15th	37
2011	Moto2	FTR	QAT	SPA	POR	FRA	CAT	GBR	NED	ITA	GER	CZE	INP; 28	RSM	ARA	JPN	AUS	MAL	VAL	NC	0

=== Supersport World Championship ===
==== Races by year ====
(key) (Races in bold indicate pole position) (Races in italics indicate fastest lap)

Year	Bike	1	2	3	4	5	6	7	8	9	10	11	12	13	14	Pos	Pts
2009	Honda	AUS	QAT	SPA	NED	ITA	RSA	USA	SMR	GBR	CZE	GER	ITA	FRA	POR; 12	30th	4
2014	Honda	AUS	SPA	NED	ITA	GBR	MAL	SMR	POR	SPA	FRA; 16	QAT				NC	0
2015	Honda	AUS; Ret	THA; 8	SPA; Ret	NED; 11	ITA; 9	GBR; 13	POR; 9	ITA; 10	MAL; 7	SPA; 14	FRA; 8	QAT			11th	55

Sporting positions
Preceded by Iván Silva	Spanish Supersport Champion; 2004	Succeeded by Arturo Tizón
