= 2014 FIM Superstock 1000 Cup =

2014 FIM Superstock 1000 Cup
Previous:	2013	Next:	2015
Support series: Superbike World Championship; Supersport World Championship; European Superstock 600 Championship; European Junior Cup

The 2014 FIM Superstock 1000 Cup was the sixteenth season of the FIM Superstock 1000 Cup, the tenth held under this name. The season was contested over seven rounds, beginning on 13 April at MotorLand Aragón in Spain, and concluding on 5 October at Circuit de Nevers Magny-Cours in France.

Barni Racing Team rider Leandro Mercado prevailed in a final round battle with Team Pedercini rider Lorenzo Savadori at Magny-Cours. Mercado, who won in Aragón and at Jerez, held a five-point lead over Savadori – who won back-to-back races at Misano and Portimão – prior to the race weekend. In the race, held in wet conditions, Savadori was leading until the penultimate lap when Matthieu Lussiana passed him. Thereafter, Savadori crashed while running in second position; he later remounted to finish in sixth position, but Mercado sealed the title by eight points, as he finished in fourth position. Lussiana's victory allowed him to finish in third place in the championship, while a second-place finish for Romain Lanusse also allowed him to overhaul David McFadden for fourth place in the final standings. Two other riders achieved race victories as Ondřej Ježek won at Imola, while Kevin Valk was able to take a home victory at Assen.

The manufacturers' championship was also decided in the final round. Ducati entered the event with a single-point lead over Kawasaki, but Lussiana's victory allowed Kawasaki to take the championship by eight points ahead of Ducati, with Jed Metcher recording the best finish at Magny-Cours of third place.

== Race calendar and results ==
The Fédération Internationale de Motocyclisme released a 7-round provisional calendar on 29 November 2013; the schedule remained unchanged after the calendar update of 12 April 2014.

Round	Country	Circuit	Date	Pole position	Fastest lap	Winning rider	Winning team	Report
1	Spain	MotorLand Aragón	13 April	(Argentina) Leandro Mercado	(Argentina) Leandro Mercado	(Argentina) Leandro Mercado	Barni Racing Team	Report
2	Netherlands	TT Circuit Assen	27 April	(Italy) Lorenzo Savadori	(Czech Republic) Ondřej Ježek	(Netherlands) Kevin Valk	MTM Racing Team	Report
3	Italy	Autodromo Enzo e Dino Ferrari	11 May	(Italy) Fabio Massei	(Italy) Lorenzo Savadori	(Czech Republic) Ondřej Ježek	Barni Racing Team	Report
4	Italy	Misano World Circuit Marco Simoncelli	22 June	(Italy) Lorenzo Savadori	(Italy) Federico Sandi	(Italy) Lorenzo Savadori	Team Pedercini	Report
5	Portugal	Autódromo Internacional do Algarve	6 July	(Italy) Lorenzo Savadori	(South Africa) David McFadden	(Italy) Lorenzo Savadori	Team Pedercini	Report
6	Spain	Circuito de Jerez	7 September	(Argentina) Leandro Mercado	(Argentina) Leandro Mercado	(Argentina) Leandro Mercado	Barni Racing Team	Report
7	France	Circuit de Nevers Magny-Cours	5 October	(Italy) Lorenzo Savadori	(Italy) Lorenzo Savadori	(France) Matthieu Lussiana	Team Garnier by ASPI	Report

== Entry list ==
2014 entry list
Team	Constructor	Motorcycle	No.	Rider	Rounds
Nuova M2 Racing	Aprilia	Aprilia RSV4 APRC	74	(Italy) Kevin Calia	3–4
FDA Racing Team	BMW	BMW S1000RR	41	(Italy) Federico D'Annunzio	1–3
H-Moto Team	BMW	BMW S1000RR	5	(Romania) Robert Mureșan	All
H-Moto Team	BMW	BMW S1000RR	27	(Italy) Riccardo Cecchini	1–3
Motos Vionnet	BMW	BMW S1000RR	51	(Switzerland) Eric Vionnet	7
2R Racing	BMW	BMW S1000RR HP4	6	(Italy) Denni Schiavoni	3
Cast16 by Sebmandi e Galvin; Cast16 Corse by Galvin; Cast16 Corse	BMW	BMW S1000RR HP4	16	(Italy) Remo Castellarin	4–7
FDA Racing Team	BMW	BMW S1000RR HP4	41	(Italy) Federico D'Annunzio	4–7
Team Motoxracing	BMW	BMW S1000RR HP4	16	(Italy) Remo Castellarin	1–3
Team Motoxracing	BMW	BMW S1000RR HP4	23	(Italy) Federico Sandi	4–7
Barni Racing Team	Ducati	Ducati 1199 Panigale R	36	(Argentina) Leandro Mercado	All
Barni Racing Team	Ducati	Ducati 1199 Panigale R	69	(Czech Republic) Ondřej Ježek	All
EAB Racing Team	Ducati	Ducati 1199 Panigale R	9	(Australia) Jed Metcher	6–7
EAB Racing Team	Ducati	Ducati 1199 Panigale R	43	(Italy) Fabio Massei	All
EAB Racing Team	Ducati	Ducati 1199 Panigale R	59	(Denmark) Alex Schacht	1–5
Moto LG Racing Team	Ducati	Ducati 1199 Panigale R	55	(Slovakia) Tomáš Svitok	3–6
Moto LG Racing Team	Ducati	Ducati 1199 Panigale R	82	(Czech Republic) Karel Pešek	1–2
Triple M Racing powered by Ducati Frankfurt	Ducati	Ducati 1199 Panigale R	28	(Germany) Marc Moser	All
Agro-On & WIL Racedays	Honda	Honda CBR1000RR	4	(United States) Joshua Day	All
Agro-On & WIL Racedays	Honda	Honda CBR1000RR	11	(United Kingdom) Kyle Smith	All
BWG Racing Kawasaki	Kawasaki	Kawasaki ZX-10R	53	(Spain) Antonio Alarcos	3–4, 6–7
BWG Racing Kawasaki	Kawasaki	Kawasaki ZX-10R	71	(Sweden) Christoffer Bergman	1
Delcamp Energie – 3D End. Team 18 – Delcamp Energie	Kawasaki	Kawasaki ZX-10R	24	(France) Stéphane Egea	1, 4, 7
Ecurie Berga	Kawasaki	Kawasaki ZX-10R	8	(France) Jonathan Hardt	3
Motorrad Mayer	Kawasaki	Kawasaki ZX-10R	95	(Austria) Julian Mayer	2–4
MRS Kawasaki	Kawasaki	Kawasaki ZX-10R	169	(South Africa) David McFadden	All
MTM Racing Team	Kawasaki	Kawasaki ZX-10R	18	(Netherlands) Kevin Valk	1–5, 7
T.R. Corse	Kawasaki	Kawasaki ZX-10R	22	(Italy) Raffaele Vargas	4
Team BSR	Kawasaki	Kawasaki ZX-10R	3	(Switzerland) Sébastien Suchet	All
Team BSR	Kawasaki	Kawasaki ZX-10R	7	(Switzerland) Jérémy Ayer	All
Team CMS	Kawasaki	Kawasaki ZX-10R	89	(France) Axel Maurin	7
Team Garnier by ASPI	Kawasaki	Kawasaki ZX-10R	94	(France) Matthieu Lussiana	All
Team Go Eleven	Kawasaki	Kawasaki ZX-10R	93	(Italy) Alberto Butti	All
Team OGP	Kawasaki	Kawasaki ZX-10R	12	(Switzerland) Jonathan Crea	All
Team OGP	Kawasaki	Kawasaki ZX-10R	39	(France) Randy Pagaud	All
Team Pedercini	Kawasaki	Kawasaki ZX-10R	15	(Italy) Simone Grotzkyj	1–4
Team Pedercini	Kawasaki	Kawasaki ZX-10R	32	(Italy) Lorenzo Savadori	All
Team Pedercini	Kawasaki	Kawasaki ZX-10R	34	(Hungary) Balázs Németh	1–6
Team Pedercini	Kawasaki	Kawasaki ZX-10R	84	(Italy) Riccardo Russo	5
Team Pedercini	Kawasaki	Kawasaki ZX-10R	90	(Spain) Javier Alviz	1–3, 5–7
Team Pedercini	Kawasaki	Kawasaki ZX-10R	98	(France) Romain Lanusse	All
AM Moto Racing Competition	Suzuki	Suzuki GSX-R1000	70	(France) Romain Maitre	7
Amici Pirelli Hoegee Suzuki	Suzuki	Suzuki GSX-R1000	77	(Netherlands) Nigel Walraven	2

Key
Regular rider
Wildcard rider
Replacement rider

- All entries used Pirelli tyres.

== Championship standings ==
=== Riders' championship ===
Pos.	Rider	Bike	ARA (Spain)	ASS (Netherlands)	IMO (Italy)	MIS (Italy)	POR (Portugal)	JER (Spain)	MAG (France)	Pts
1	(Argentina) Leandro Mercado	Ducati	**1**	5	3	2	9	**1**	4	117
2	(Italy) Lorenzo Savadori	Kawasaki	2	**4**	Ret	**1**	**1**	3	**6**	109
3	(France) Matthieu Lussiana	Kawasaki	6	3	11	8	2	Ret	1	84
4	(France) Romain Lanusse	Kawasaki	10	7	4	7	8	8	2	73
5	(South Africa) David McFadden	Kawasaki	8	6	7	5	3	7	9	70
6	(Czech Republic) Ondřej Ježek	Ducati	DSQ	2	1	4	Ret	5	Ret	69
7	(Italy) Fabio Massei	Ducati	Ret	8	**2**	3	6	4	Ret	67
8	(United Kingdom) Kyle Smith	Honda	3	Ret	16	10	4	2	Ret	55
9	(Netherlands) Kevin Valk	Kawasaki	9	1	Ret	9	11		8	52
10	(Italy) Federico D'Annunzio	BMW	5	14	9	6	7	21	10	45
11	(United States) Joshua Day	Honda	11	11	5	Ret	5	6	Ret	42
12	(Hungary) Balázs Németh	Kawasaki	Ret	9	6	11	10	Ret		28
13	(Romania) Robert Mureșan	BMW	Ret	Ret	8	13	12	10	Ret	21
14	(Switzerland) Sébastien Suchet	Kawasaki	14	Ret	10	16	16	11	11	18
15	(Australia) Jed Metcher	Ducati						Ret	3	16
16	(Italy) Federico Sandi	BMW				Ret	13	14	5	16
17	(Sweden) Christoffer Bergman	Kawasaki	4							13
18	(France) Stéphane Egea	Kawasaki	Ret			14			7	11
19	(Italy) Simone Grotzkyj	Kawasaki	7	18	15	Ret				10
20	(France) Randy Pagaud	Kawasaki	13	13	12	19	Ret	16	Ret	10
21	(Spain) Javier Alviz	Kawasaki	16	19	Ret		14	12	13	9
22	(Spain) Antonio Alarcos	Kawasaki			18	15		9	Ret	8
23	(Denmark) Alex Schacht	Ducati	15	12	13	18	18			8
24	(Italy) Remo Castellarin	BMW	12	Ret	Ret	21	17	13	Ret	7
25	(Netherlands) Nigel Walraven	Suzuki		10						6
26	(Switzerland) Jérémy Ayer	Kawasaki	Ret	15	Ret	Ret	19	20	12	5
27	(Italy) Kevin Calia	Aprilia			Ret	12				4
28	(Germany) Marc Moser	Ducati	DNS	WD	14	Ret	DNS	15	15	4
29	(France) Axel Maurin	Kawasaki							14	2
30	(Italy) Alberto Butti	Kawasaki	Ret	Ret	19	Ret	15	18	Ret	1
	(Switzerland) Jonathan Crea	Kawasaki	18	16	Ret	DNS	Ret	17	Ret	0
	(Italy) Raffaele Vargas	Kawasaki				17				0
	(Austria) Julian Mayer	Kawasaki		Ret	17	20				0
	(Italy) Riccardo Cecchini	BMW	19	17	22					0
	(Czech Republic) Karel Pešek	Ducati	17	DNS						0
	(Slovakia) Tomáš Svitok	Ducati			21	22	20	19		0
	(France) Jonathan Hardt	Kawasaki			20					0
	(Switzerland) Eric Vionnet	BMW							Ret	0
	(Italy) Denni Schiavoni	BMW			Ret					0
	(France) Romain Maitre	Suzuki							DSQ	0
	(Italy) Riccardo Russo	Kawasaki					WD			0
Pos.	Rider	Bike	ARA (Spain)	ASS (Netherlands)	IMO (Italy)	MIS (Italy)	POR (Portugal)	JER (Spain)	MAG (France)	Pts

Colour	Result
Gold	Winner
Silver	Second place
Bronze	Third place
Green	Points classification
Blue	Non-points classification
Blue	Non-classified finish (NC)
Purple	Retired, not classified (Ret)
Red	Did not qualify (DNQ)
Red	Did not pre-qualify (DNPQ)
Black	Disqualified (DSQ)
White	Did not start (DNS)
White	Withdrew (WD)
White	Race cancelled (C)
Blank	Did not practice (DNP)
Blank	Did not arrive (DNA)
Blank	Excluded (EX)

**Bold** – Pole position
Italics – Fastest lap

=== Manufacturers' championship ===
Pos.	Manufacturer	ARA (Spain)	ASS (Netherlands)	IMO (Italy)	MIS (Italy)	POR (Portugal)	JER (Spain)	MAG (France)	Pts
1	(Japan) Kawasaki	2	1	4	1	1	3	1	149
2	(Italy) Ducati	1	2	1	2	6	1	3	141
3	(Japan) Honda	3	11	5	10	4	2	Ret	71
4	(Germany) BMW	5	14	8	6	7	10	5	57
5	(Japan) Suzuki		10					DSQ	6
6	(Italy) Aprilia			Ret	12				4
Pos.	Manufacturer	ARA (Spain)	ASS (Netherlands)	IMO (Italy)	MIS (Italy)	POR (Portugal)	JER (Spain)	MAG (France)	Pts
