= Vincent Braillard =

Swiss motorcycle racer (born 1985)

- Nationality: Swiss
- Born: 29 April 1985 (age 41); Montet, Switzerland
Motorcycle racing career statistics
125cc World Championship
Active years	2002, 2004–2006
Manufacturers	Honda, Aprilia
Starts / Wins / Podiums / Poles / F. laps / Points; 28 / 0 / 0 / 0 / 0 / 0

Vincent Braillard (born 29 April 1985) is a Swiss motorcycle racer.

After his racing career, Braillard started a new career as a floorball player. He currently plays for Unihockey Team Semsales.

== Career statistics ==
=== Grand Prix motorcycle racing ===
==== By season ====
Season	Class	Motorcycle	Team	Race	Win	Podium	Pole	FLap	Pts	Plcd
2002	125cc	Honda	Team Philippe Coulon	1	0	0	0	0	0	NC
2002	125cc	Honda	Team-TMR-Competición	1	0	0	0	0	0	NC
2004	125cc	Honda	TMR Competición	0	0	0	0	0	0	NC
2005	125cc	Aprilia	Road Racing Team Hungary; Team Tóth	12	0	0	0	0	0	NC
2006	125cc	Aprilia	Multimedia Racing	14	0	0	0	0	0	NC
Total				28	0	0	0	0	0	

==== Races by year ====
(key)

Year	Class	Bike	1	2	3	4	5	6	7	8	9	10	11	12	13	14	15	16	Pos.	Pts
2002	125cc	Honda	JPN	RSA	SPA	FRA; Ret	ITA	CAT	NED	GBR	GER	CZE	POR	BRA	PAC	MAL	AUS	VAL; 29	NC	0
2004	125cc	Honda	RSA	SPA	FRA	ITA	CAT	NED	BRA	GER	GBR	CZE	POR; DNQ	JPN	QAT	MAL	AUS	VAL	NC	0
2005	125cc	Aprilia	SPA; 25	POR; 31	CHN; DNS	FRA; Ret	ITA; 28	CAT; Ret	NED; 27	GBR; 23	GER; 22	CZE; 21	JPN; 27	MAL; Ret	QAT	AUS	TUR	VAL; 23	NC	0
2006	125cc	Aprilia	SPA; 25	QAT; 20	TUR; 32	CHN; 30	FRA; 28	ITA; 26	CAT; 23	NED; 21	GBR; 22	GER; 21	CZE; Ret	MAL; Ret	AUS; 23	JPN; 17	POR	VAL	NC	0
