= Jordi Carchano =

Spanish motorcycle racer

- Nationality: Spanish
- Born: 2 July 1984 (age 42); Sant Quirze del Vallès, Catalonia Spain
Motorcycle racing career statistics
250cc World Championship
| Active years | 2006 |
| Manufacturers | Aprilia |
| Championships | 0 |
Starts / Wins / Podiums / Poles / F. laps / Points; 15 / 0 / 0 / 0 / 0 / 0
125cc World Championship
| Active years | 2003-2005 |
| Manufacturers | Aprilia |
| Championships | 0 |
Starts / Wins / Podiums / Poles / F. laps / Points; 31 / 0 / 0 / 0 / 0 / 0

Jordi Carchano (born 2 July 1984 in Sant Quirze del Vallès, Catalonia Spain) is a motorcycle road racer. He raced in the 125cc and 250cc World Championships from 2003 to 2006.

== Career statistics ==
=== By season ===
| Season | Class | Moto | Team | Races | Win | Podiums | Pole | Pts | Position |
|---|---|---|---|---|---|---|---|---|---|
| 2003 | 125cc | Honda | TMR Competicion | 1 | 0 | 0 | 0 | 0 | NC |
| 2004 | 125cc | Aprilia | Matteoni Racing | 14 | 0 | 0 | 0 | 2 | 31st |
| 2005 | 125cc | Aprilia | MVA Aspar | 16 | 0 | 0 | 0 | 6 | 29th |
| 2006 | 250cc | Honda | Stop And Go Racing Team | 3 | 0 | 0 | 0 | 4 | 29th |
| 2006 | 250cc | Aprilia | WTR Blauer USA | 12 | 0 | 0 | 0 | 4 | 29th |
| Total | | | | **46** | **0** | **0** | **0** | **12** | |

=== Races by year ===
(key) (Races in bold indicate pole position)

| Year | Class | Bike | 1 | 2 | 3 | 4 | 5 | 6 | 7 | 8 | 9 | 10 | 11 | 12 | 13 | 14 | 15 | 16 | Pos. | Pts |
|---|---|---|---|---|---|---|---|---|---|---|---|---|---|---|---|---|---|---|---|---|
| 2003 | 125cc | Honda | JPN | RSA | SPA | FRA | ITA | CAT; 25 | NED | GBR | GER | CZE | POR | BRA | PAC | MAL | AUS | VAL | NC | 0 |
| 2004 | 125cc | Aprilia | RSA; 27 | SPA; 14 | FRA; 24 | ITA; 21 | CAT; 23 | NED | BRA; Ret | GER; 24 | GBR | CZE; Ret | POR; 20 | JPN; 19 | QAT; 22 | MAL; 16 | AUS; 28 | VAL; 27 | 31st | 2 |
| 2005 | 125cc | Aprilia | SPA; 13 | POR; 17 | CHN; 22 | FRA; Ret | ITA; 23 | CAT; 27 | NED; 28 | GBR; 13 | GER; 26 | CZE; Ret | JPN; 30 | MAL; 28 | QAT; 25 | AUS; 25 | TUR; 19 | VAL; 17 | 29th | 6 |
| 2006 | 250cc | Honda | SPA; 18 | QAT; Ret | TUR; 17 | CHN | | | | | | | | | | | | | 29th | 4 |
| 2006 | 250cc | Aprilia | | | | | FRA; 22 | ITA; Ret | CAT; 17 | NED; 17 | GBR; Ret | GER; 20 | CZE; 18 | MAL; 12 | AUS; 17 | JPN; 22 | POR; 19 | VAL; 22 | 29th | 4 |
