= 2007 French motorcycle Grand Prix =

(France) 2007 French Grand Prix
Race details
- Race 5 of 18 races in the 2007 Grand Prix motorcycle racing season
- Date: 20 May 2007
- Official name: Alice Grand Prix de France
- Location: Bugatti Circuit
- Course: Permanent racing facility; 4.180 km (2.597 mi)

MotoGP
Pole position
- Rider: (United States) Colin Edwards
- Time: 1:33.616
Fastest lap
- Rider: (United States) John Hopkins
- Time: 1:38.678
Podium
- First: (Australia) Chris Vermeulen
- Second: (Italy) Marco Melandri
- Third: (Australia) Casey Stoner

250cc
Pole position
- Rider: (Spain) Jorge Lorenzo
- Time: 1:37.934
Fastest lap
- Rider: (Italy) Andrea Dovizioso
- Time: 1:38.566
Podium
- First: (Spain) Jorge Lorenzo
- Second: (Italy) Andrea Dovizioso
- Third: (San Marino) Alex de Angelis

125cc
Pole position
- Rider: (Italy) Mattia Pasini
- Time: 1:43.111
Fastest lap
- Rider: (Czech Republic) Lukáš Pešek
- Time: 1:43.859
Podium
- First: (Spain) Sergio Gadea
- Second: (Czech Republic) Lukáš Pešek
- Third: (United Kingdom) Bradley Smith

The 2007 French motorcycle Grand Prix was the fifth round of the 2007 MotoGP championship. It took place on the weekend of 18–20 May 2007 at the Le Mans Bugatti Circuit.

The MotoGP race was subject to wet weather and the race saw the first time in the 800cc MotoGP formula era where riders changed bikes mid-race as a result of the conditions.

== MotoGP classification ==
Pos.	No.	Rider	Team	Manufacturer	Laps	Time/Retired	Grid	Points
1	71	(Australia) Chris Vermeulen	Rizla Suzuki MotoGP	Suzuki	28	50:58.713	12	25
2	33	(Italy) Marco Melandri	Honda Gresini	Honda	28	+12.599	9	20
3	27	(Australia) Casey Stoner	Ducati Marlboro Team	Ducati	28	+27.347	2	16
4	26	(Spain) Dani Pedrosa	Repsol Honda Team	Honda	28	+37.328	10	13
5	66	(Germany) Alex Hofmann	Pramac d'Antin	Ducati	28	+49.166	17	11
6	46	(Italy) Valentino Rossi	Fiat Yamaha Team	Yamaha	28	+53.563	4	10
7	21	(United States) John Hopkins	Rizla Suzuki MotoGP	Suzuki	28	+1:01.073	5	9
8	65	(Italy) Loris Capirossi	Ducati Marlboro Team	Ducati	28	+1:21.241	15	8
9	6	(Japan) Makoto Tamada	Dunlop Yamaha Tech 3	Yamaha	27	+1 lap	16	7
10	50	(France) Sylvain Guintoli	Dunlop Yamaha Tech 3	Yamaha	27	+1 lap	11	6
11	11	(Spain) Fonsi Nieto	Kawasaki Racing Team	Kawasaki	27	+1 lap	19	5
12	5	(United States) Colin Edwards	Fiat Yamaha Team	Yamaha	25	+3 laps	1	4
Ret	4	(Brazil) Alex Barros	Pramac d'Antin	Ducati	27	Accident	13	
Ret	10	(United States) Kenny Roberts Jr.	Team Roberts	KR212V	26	Retirement	18	
Ret	1	(United States) Nicky Hayden	Repsol Honda Team	Honda	25	Accident	7	
Ret	56	(Japan) Shinya Nakano	Konica Minolta Honda	Honda	20	Accident	14	
Ret	14	(France) Randy de Puniet	Kawasaki Racing Team	Kawasaki	8	Accident	8	
Ret	24	(Spain) Toni Elías	Honda Gresini	Honda	7	Accident	6	
Ret	7	(Spain) Carlos Checa	Honda LCR	Honda	6	Accident	3	

== 250 cc classification ==
Pos.	No.	Rider	Manufacturer	Laps	Time/Retired	Grid	Points
1	1	(Spain) Jorge Lorenzo	Aprilia	26	43:12.237	1	25
2	34	(Italy) Andrea Dovizioso	Honda	26	+0.156	8	20
3	3	(San Marino) Alex de Angelis	Aprilia	26	+2.733	6	16
4	80	(Spain) Héctor Barberá	Aprilia	26	+5.971	3	13
5	60	(Spain) Julián Simón	Honda	26	+6.111	2	11
6	58	(Italy) Marco Simoncelli	Gilera	26	+22.753	7	10
7	36	(Finland) Mika Kallio	KTM	26	+23.139	9	9
8	19	(Spain) Álvaro Bautista	Aprilia	26	+27.416	5	8
9	73	(Japan) Shuhei Aoyama	Honda	26	+28.915	12	7
10	14	(Australia) Anthony West	Aprilia	26	+33.950	11	6
11	8	(Thailand) Ratthapark Wilairot	Honda	26	+57.900	20	5
12	32	(Italy) Fabrizio Lai	Aprilia	26	+58.011	13	4
13	25	(Italy) Alex Baldolini	Aprilia	26	+1:06.251	22	3
14	44	(Japan) Taro Sekiguchi	Aprilia	26	+1:06.720	18	2
15	50	(Republic of Ireland) Eugene Laverty	Honda	26	+1:07.649	19	1
16	28	(Germany) Dirk Heidolf	Aprilia	26	+1:14.837	16	
17	9	(Spain) Arturo Tizón	Aprilia	26	+1:31.455	23	
18	41	(Spain) Aleix Espargaró	Aprilia	26	+1:39.701	14	
Ret	10	(Hungary) Imre Tóth	Aprilia	15	Retirement	21	
Ret	4	(Japan) Hiroshi Aoyama	KTM	12	Retirement	10	
Ret	16	(France) Jules Cluzel	Aprilia	5	Accident	15	
Ret	17	(Czech Republic) Karel Abraham	Aprilia	5	Accident	17	
Ret	12	(Switzerland) Thomas Lüthi	Aprilia	2	Retirement	4	
DNS	15	(Italy) Roberto Locatelli	Gilera	0	Did not start	24	
OFFICIAL 250cc REPORT

== 125 cc classification ==
Pos.	No.	Rider	Manufacturer	Laps	Time/Retired	Grid	Points
1	33	(Spain) Sergio Gadea	Aprilia	24	41:50.112	6	25
2	52	(Czech Republic) Lukáš Pešek	Derbi	24	+0.478	5	20
3	38	(United Kingdom) Bradley Smith	Honda	24	+2.963	2	16
4	14	(Hungary) Gábor Talmácsi	Aprilia	24	+13.516	8	13
5	6	(Spain) Joan Olivé	Aprilia	24	+13.845	18	11
6	55	(Spain) Héctor Faubel	Aprilia	24	+15.098	4	10
7	11	(Germany) Sandro Cortese	Aprilia	24	+15.603	14	9
8	24	(Italy) Simone Corsi	Aprilia	24	+15.664	13	8
9	63	(France) Mike Di Meglio	Honda	24	+15.777	10	7
10	71	(Japan) Tomoyoshi Koyama	KTM	24	+19.108	3	6
11	44	(Spain) Pol Espargaró	Aprilia	24	+23.920	19	5
12	7	(France) Alexis Masbou	Honda	24	+24.210	11	4
13	34	(Switzerland) Randy Krummenacher	KTM	24	+29.517	15	3
14	60	(Austria) Michael Ranseder	Derbi	24	+29.701	9	2
15	22	(Spain) Pablo Nieto	Aprilia	24	+34.936 (Note: Pablo Nieto received a 20-second penalty.)	17	1
16	8	(Italy) Lorenzo Zanetti	Aprilia	24	+45.124	16	
17	27	(Italy) Stefano Bianco	Aprilia	24	+45.308	20	
18	53	(Italy) Simone Grotzkyj	Aprilia	24	+46.142	21	
19	18	(Spain) Nicolás Terol	Derbi	24	+46.350	22	
20	77	(Switzerland) Dominique Aegerter	Aprilia	24	+1:00.825	25	
21	13	(Italy) Dino Lombardi	Honda	24	+1:00.948	23	
22	20	(Italy) Roberto Tamburini	Aprilia	24	+1:09.701	26	
23	95	(Romania) Robert Mureșan	Derbi	24	+1:10.101	24	
24	56	(Netherlands) Hugo van den Berg	Aprilia	24	+1:10.295	28	
25	37	(Netherlands) Joey Litjens	Honda	24	+1:10.471	29	
26	15	(Italy) Federico Sandi	Aprilia	24	+1:16.496	30	
27	99	(United Kingdom) Danny Webb	Honda	24	+1:21.822	31	
28	46	(France) Romain Maitre	Honda	23	+1 lap	32	
29	47	(France) Steven Le Coquen	Honda	23	+1 lap	34	
Ret	75	(Italy) Mattia Pasini	Aprilia	19	Retirement	1	
Ret	35	(Italy) Raffaele De Rosa	Aprilia	15	Retirement	12	
Ret	29	(Italy) Andrea Iannone	Aprilia	14	Accident	7	
Ret	48	(France) Julien Cartron	Honda	11	Retirement	33	
Ret	51	(United States) Stevie Bonsey	KTM	3	Accident	27	
DNS	12	(Spain) Esteve Rabat	Honda		Did not start		
DNS	45	(France) Valentin Debise	Honda		Did not start		
DNQ	49	(France) Gwen Le Badezet	Honda		Did not qualify		
OFFICIAL 125cc REPORT

== Championship standings after the race (MotoGP) ==
Below are the standings for the top five riders and constructors after round five has concluded.

Riders' Championship standings

Pos.	Rider	Points
1	(Australia) Casey Stoner	102
2	(Italy) Valentino Rossi	81
3	(Spain) Dani Pedrosa	62
4	(Italy) Marco Melandri	61
5	(Australia) Chris Vermeulen	55

Constructors' Championship standings

Pos.	Constructor	Points
1	(Italy) Ducati	102
2	(Japan) Honda	89
3	(Japan) Yamaha	81
4	(Japan) Suzuki	71
5	(Japan) Kawasaki	28

- Note: Only the top five positions are included for both sets of standings.

== Notes ==
Previous race: 2007 Chinese Grand Prix	FIM Grand Prix World Championship; 2007 season	Next race: 2007 Italian Grand Prix
Previous race: 2006 French Grand Prix	French motorcycle Grand Prix	Next race: 2008 French Grand Prix
