= 2006 French motorcycle Grand Prix =

(France) 2006 French Grand Prix
Race details
- Race 5 of 17 races in the 2006 Grand Prix motorcycle racing season
- Date: 21 May 2006
- Official name: Alice Grand Prix de France
- Location: Bugatti Circuit
- Course: Permanent racing facility; 4.180 km (2.597 mi)

MotoGP
Pole position
- Rider: (Spain) Dani Pedrosa
- Time: 1:33.990
Fastest lap
- Rider: (Italy) Valentino Rossi
- Time: 1:35.087
Podium
- First: (Italy) Marco Melandri
- Second: (Italy) Loris Capirossi
- Third: (Spain) Dani Pedrosa

250cc
Pole position
- Rider: (Italy) Andrea Dovizioso
- Time: 1:39.733
Fastest lap
- Rider: (Japan) Hiroshi Aoyama
- Time: 1:39.964
Podium
- First: (Japan) Yuki Takahashi
- Second: (Italy) Andrea Dovizioso
- Third: (Japan) Shuhei Aoyama

125cc
Pole position
- Rider: (Italy) Mattia Pasini
- Time: 1:44.515
Fastest lap
- Rider: (Spain) Sergio Gadea
- Time: 1:44.637
Podium
- First: (Switzerland) Thomas Lüthi
- Second: (Finland) Mika Kallio
- Third: (Italy) Fabrizio Lai

The 2006 French motorcycle Grand Prix was the fifth race of the 2006 Motorcycle Grand Prix season. It took place on the weekend of 19–21 May 2006 at the Le Mans Bugatti circuit.

== MotoGP classification ==
Pos.	No.	Rider	Team	Manufacturer	Laps	Time/Retired	Grid	Points
1	33	(Italy) Marco Melandri	Fortuna Honda	Honda	28	44:57.369	5	25
2	65	(Italy) Loris Capirossi	Ducati Marlboro Team	Ducati	28	+1.929	6	20
3	26	(Spain) Dani Pedrosa	Repsol Honda Team	Honda	28	+2.269	1	16
4	27	(Australia) Casey Stoner	Honda LCR	Honda	28	+5.494	11	13
5	69	(United States) Nicky Hayden	Repsol Honda Team	Honda	28	+5.709	10	11
6	5	(United States) Colin Edwards	Camel Yamaha Team	Yamaha	28	+11.519	9	10
7	6	(Japan) Makoto Tamada	Konica Minolta Honda	Honda	28	+16.692	13	9
8	15	(Spain) Sete Gibernau	Ducati Marlboro Team	Ducati	28	+18.142	8	8
9	24	(Spain) Toni Elías	Fortuna Honda	Honda	28	+23.645	16	7
10	71	(Australia) Chris Vermeulen	Rizla Suzuki MotoGP	Suzuki	28	+39.362	12	6
11	7	(Spain) Carlos Checa	Tech 3 Yamaha	Yamaha	28	+47.730	14	5
12	56	(Japan) Shinya Nakano	Kawasaki Racing Team	Kawasaki	28	+47.782	2	4
13	66	(Germany) Alex Hofmann	Pramac d'Antin MotoGP	Ducati	28	+1:09.092	18	3
14	77	(United Kingdom) James Ellison	Tech 3 Yamaha	Yamaha	28	+1:16.172	17	2
15	21	(United States) John Hopkins	Rizla Suzuki MotoGP	Suzuki	26	+2 laps	3	1
Ret	30	(Spain) José Luis Cardoso	Pramac d'Antin MotoGP	Ducati	21	Retirement	19	
Ret	46	(Italy) Valentino Rossi	Camel Yamaha Team	Yamaha	20	Mechanical	7	
Ret	10	(United States) Kenny Roberts Jr.	Team Roberts	KR211V	1	Retirement	15	
Ret	17	(France) Randy de Puniet	Kawasaki Racing Team	Kawasaki	0	Accident	4	

== 250 cc classification ==
Pos.	No.	Rider	Manufacturer	Laps	Time/Retired	Grid	Points
1	55	(Japan) Yuki Takahashi	Honda	26	43:42.773	4	25
2	34	(Italy) Andrea Dovizioso	Honda	26	+0.098	1	20
3	73	(Japan) Shuhei Aoyama	Honda	26	+2.215	5	16
4	4	(Japan) Hiroshi Aoyama	KTM	26	+2.484	7	13
5	7	(San Marino) Alex de Angelis	Aprilia	26	+11.270	2	11
6	15	(Italy) Roberto Locatelli	Aprilia	26	+14.597	9	10
7	80	(Spain) Héctor Barberá	Aprilia	26	+16.829	3	9
8	58	(Italy) Marco Simoncelli	Gilera	26	+17.041	11	8
9	50	(France) Sylvain Guintoli	Aprilia	26	+17.589	12	7
10	96	(Czech Republic) Jakub Smrž	Aprilia	26	+17.805	6	6
11	14	(Australia) Anthony West	Aprilia	26	+39.032	13	5
12	8	(Italy) Andrea Ballerini	Aprilia	26	+41.728	14	4
13	36	(Colombia) Martín Cárdenas	Honda	26	+45.150	18	3
14	19	(Argentina) Sebastián Porto	Honda	26	+46.545	10	2
15	21	(France) Arnaud Vincent	Honda	26	+55.747	22	1
16	23	(Spain) Arturo Tizón	Honda	26	+55.846	17	
17	54	(San Marino) Manuel Poggiali	KTM	26	+57.241	15	
18	28	(Germany) Dirk Heidolf	Aprilia	26	+1:16.941	20	
19	25	(Italy) Alex Baldolini	Aprilia	26	+1:25.856	16	
20	31	(Italy) Álvaro Molina	Aprilia	26	+1:28.715	23	
21	22	(Italy) Luca Morelli	Aprilia	26	+1:31.926	26	
22	24	(Spain) Jordi Carchano	Aprilia	26	+1:39.853	25	
23	85	(Italy) Alessio Palumbo	Aprilia	25	+1 lap	27	
Ret	48	(Spain) Jorge Lorenzo	Aprilia	6	Accident	8	
Ret	16	(France) Jules Cluzel	Aprilia	0	Accident	21	
Ret	45	(United Kingdom) Dan Linfoot	Honda	0	Accident	24	
Ret	57	(United Kingdom) Chaz Davies	Aprilia	0	Accident	19	
DNQ	47	(France) Marc-Antoine Scaccia	Aprilia		Did not qualify		

== 125 cc classification ==
Pos.	No.	Rider	Manufacturer	Laps	Time/Retired	Grid	Points
1	1	(Switzerland) Thomas Lüthi	Honda	24	42:54.555	9	25
2	36	(Finland) Mika Kallio	KTM	24	+3.380	6	20
3	32	(Italy) Fabrizio Lai	Honda	24	+9.807	8	16
4	19	(Spain) Álvaro Bautista	Aprilia	24	+10.789	2	13
5	22	(Spain) Pablo Nieto	Aprilia	24	+14.850	7	11
6	35	(Italy) Raffaele De Rosa	Aprilia	24	+17.226	22	10
7	6	(Spain) Joan Olivé	Aprilia	24	+20.577	10	9
8	33	(Spain) Sergio Gadea	Aprilia	24	+21.818	12	8
9	29	(Italy) Andrea Iannone	Aprilia	24	+27.038	11	7
10	24	(Italy) Simone Corsi	Gilera	24	+30.171	13	6
11	10	(Spain) Ángel Rodríguez	Aprilia	24	+30.555	20	5
12	60	(Spain) Julián Simón	KTM	24	+30.815	14	4
13	71	(Japan) Tomoyoshi Koyama	Malaguti	24	+30.890	19	3
14	55	(Spain) Héctor Faubel	Aprilia	24	+31.450	15	2
15	11	(Germany) Sandro Cortese	Honda	24	+31.872	17	1
16	9	(Austria) Michael Ranseder	KTM	24	+39.061	27	
17	14	(Hungary) Gábor Talmácsi	Honda	24	+45.468	4	
18	17	(Germany) Stefan Bradl	KTM	24	+45.717	23	
19	23	(Italy) Lorenzo Baroni	Honda	24	+46.078	29	
20	45	(Hungary) Imre Tóth	Aprilia	24	+46.299	21	
21	38	(United Kingdom) Bradley Smith	Honda	24	+46.581	25	
22	43	(Spain) Manuel Hernández	Aprilia	24	+49.294	30	
23	15	(Italy) Michele Pirro	Aprilia	24	+1:00.773	24	
24	37	(Netherlands) Joey Litjens	Honda	24	+1:01.128	28	
25	44	(Czech Republic) Karel Abraham	Aprilia	24	+1:05.340	31	
26	78	(Netherlands) Hugo van den Berg	Aprilia	24	+1:05.989	26	
27	63	(France) Mike Di Meglio	Honda	24	+1:15.109	16	
28	26	(Switzerland) Vincent Braillard	Aprilia	24	+1:36.501	39	
29	7	(France) Alexis Masbou	Malaguti	23	+1 lap	33	
30	13	(Italy) Dino Lombardi	Aprilia	23	+1 lap	40	
31	85	(France) Yannick Deschamps	Honda	23	+1 lap	37	
Ret	53	(Italy) Simone Grotzkyj	Aprilia	13	Retirement	35	
Ret	18	(Spain) Nicolás Terol	Derbi	7	Retirement	18	
Ret	20	(Italy) Roberto Tamburini	Aprilia	4	Accident	32	
Ret	52	(Czech Republic) Lukáš Pešek	Derbi	1	Accident	3	
Ret	16	(Italy) Michele Conti	Honda	0	Accident	36	
Ret	21	(Spain) Mateo Túnez	Aprilia	0	Accident	34	
Ret	75	(Italy) Mattia Pasini	Aprilia	0	Accident	1	
Ret	8	(Italy) Lorenzo Zanetti	Aprilia	0	Accident	5	
Ret	82	(France) Matthieu Lussiana	Honda	0	Accident	38	
DNS	83	(France) Clément Dunikowski	Honda		Did not start		
DNS	84	(France) Mathieu Olagnon	Honda		Did not start		
DNQ	41	(Spain) Aleix Espargaró	Honda		Did not qualify		
DNQ	12	(Italy) Federico Sandi	Aprilia		Did not qualify		

== Championship standings after the race (MotoGP) ==
Below are the standings for the top five riders and constructors after round five has concluded.

Riders' Championship standings

Pos.	Rider	Points
1	(United States) Nicky Hayden	83
2	(Italy) Marco Melandri	79
3	(Italy) Loris Capirossi	79
4	(Spain) Dani Pedrosa	73
5	(Australia) Casey Stoner	65

Constructors' Championship standings

Pos.	Constructor	Points
1	(Japan) Honda	115
2	(Italy) Ducati	79
3	(Japan) Yamaha	69
4	(Japan) Suzuki	35
5	(Japan) Kawasaki	32

- Note: Only the top five positions are included for both sets of standings.

Previous race: 2006 Chinese Grand Prix	FIM Grand Prix World Championship; 2006 season	Next race: 2006 Italian Grand Prix
Previous race: 2005 French Grand Prix	French motorcycle Grand Prix	Next race: 2007 French Grand Prix
