= Romain Maitre =

French motorcycle racer

Romain Maitre bg du 70
- Nationality: French
- Born: 1 June 1988 (age 38); Vesoul (France)
- Current team: AM Moto Racing Competition
- Bike number: 3

Romain Maitre is a Grand Prix motorcycle racer from France. He competes in the Endurance FIM World Cup aboard a Kawasaki ZX-10R.

== Career statistics ==
=== Career highlights ===
- 2011 - NC, FIM Superstock 1000 Cup, Kawasaki ZX-10R
- 2014 - NC, FIM Superstock 1000 Cup, Suzuki GSX-R1000
- 2016 - NC, FIM Superstock 1000 Cup, Kawasaki ZX-10R

=== Grand Prix motorcycle racing ===
==== By season ====
Season	Class	Motorcycle	Team	Number	Race	Win	Podium	Pole	FLap	Pts	Plcd
2007	125cc	Honda	TXR Racing - TJP	46	1	0	0	0	0	0	NC
Total					**1**	**0**	**0**	**0**	**0**	**0**	

==== Races by year ====
Year	Class	Bike	1	2	3	4	5	6	7	8	9	10	11	12	13	14	15	16	17	Pos	Points
2007	125cc	Honda	QAT	SPA	TUR	CHN	FRA; 28	ITA	CAT	GBR	NED	GER	CZE	RSM	POR	JPN	AUS	MAL	VAL	NC	0

=== Superstock 1000 Cup ===
==== Races by year ====
(key) (Races in bold indicate pole position) (Races in italics indicate fastest lap)

Year	Bike	1	2	3	4	5	6	7	8	9	10	Pos	Pts
2011	Kawasaki	NED	MNZ	SMR	ARA	BRN	SIL	NŰR	IMO	MAG; 22	ALG	NC	0
2014	Suzuki	ARA	NED	IMO	MIS	ALG	JER	MAG; DSQ				NC	0
2016	Kawasaki	ARA	NED	IMO	DON	MIS	LAU	MAG; 20	JER			NC	0
