= 2005 French motorcycle Grand Prix =

(France) 2005 French Grand Prix
Race details
- Race 4 of 17 races in the 2005 Grand Prix motorcycle racing season
- Date: 15 May 2005
- Official name: Grand Prix Alice de France
- Location: Bugatti Circuit
- Course: Permanent racing facility; 4.180 km (2.597 mi)

MotoGP
Pole position
- Rider: (Italy) Valentino Rossi
- Time: 1:33.226
Fastest lap
- Rider: (Italy) Valentino Rossi
- Time: 1:33.678 on lap 28
Podium
- First: (Italy) Valentino Rossi
- Second: (Spain) Sete Gibernau
- Third: (United States) Colin Edwards

250cc
Pole position
- Rider: (Spain) Daniel Pedrosa
- Time: 1:37.391
Fastest lap
- Rider: (France) Randy de Puniet
- Time: 1:37.594 on lap 24
Podium
- First: (Spain) Daniel Pedrosa
- Second: (France) Randy de Puniet
- Third: (Italy) Andrea Dovizioso

125cc
Pole position
- Rider: (Switzerland) Thomas Lüthi
- Time: 1:43.405
Fastest lap
- Rider: (Finland) Mika Kallio
- Time: 1:43.373 on lap 24
Podium
- First: (Switzerland) Thomas Lüthi
- Second: (Spain) Sergio Gadea
- Third: (Finland) Mika Kallio

The 2005 French motorcycle Grand Prix was the fourth round of the 2005 MotoGP Championship. It took place on the weekend of 13–15 May 2005 at the Bugatti Circuit located in Le Mans, France.

== MotoGP classification ==
Makoto Tamada was replaced by Jurgen van den Goorbergh after the first practice session due to a wrist injury he had sustained at the Portuguese Grand Prix.

| Pos. | No. | Rider | Team | Manufacturer | Laps | Time/Retired | Grid | Points |
|---|---|---|---|---|---|---|---|---|
| 1 | 46 | (Italy) Valentino Rossi | Gauloises Yamaha Team | Yamaha | 28 | 44:12.223 | 1 | 25 |
| 2 | 15 | (Spain) Sete Gibernau | Movistar Honda MotoGP | Honda | 28 | +0.382 | 4 | 20 |
| 3 | 5 | (United States) Colin Edwards | Gauloises Yamaha Team | Yamaha | 28 | +5.711 | 2 | 16 |
| 4 | 33 | (Italy) Marco Melandri | Movistar Honda MotoGP | Honda | 28 | +7.276 | 3 | 13 |
| 5 | 3 | (Italy) Max Biaggi | Repsol Honda Team | Honda | 28 | +7.703 | 8 | 11 |
| 6 | 69 | (United States) Nicky Hayden | Repsol Honda Team | Honda | 28 | +21.770 | 5 | 10 |
| 7 | 65 | (Italy) Loris Capirossi | Ducati Marlboro Team | Ducati | 28 | +24.664 | 10 | 9 |
| 8 | 56 | (Japan) Shinya Nakano | Kawasaki Racing Team | Kawasaki | 28 | +35.940 | 6 | 8 |
| 9 | 24 | (Spain) Toni Elías | Fortuna Yamaha Team | Yamaha | 28 | +38.062 | 12 | 7 |
| 10 | 12 | (Australia) Troy Bayliss | Camel Honda | Honda | 28 | +52.607 | 15 | 6 |
| 11 | 19 | (France) Olivier Jacque | Kawasaki Racing Team | Kawasaki | 28 | +53.302 | 13 | 5 |
| 12 | 11 | (Spain) Rubén Xaus | Fortuna Yamaha Team | Yamaha | 28 | +1:00.342 | 16 | 4 |
| 13 | 10 | (United States) Kenny Roberts Jr. | Team Suzuki MotoGP | Suzuki | 28 | +1:00.514 | 14 | 3 |
| 14 | 16 | (Netherlands) Jurgen vd Goorbergh | Konica Minolta Honda | Honda | 28 | +1:17.993 | 19 | 2 |
| 15 | 44 | (Italy) Roberto Rolfo | Team d'Antin Pramac | Ducati | 28 | +1:32.233 | 18 | 1 |
| 16 | 21 | (United States) John Hopkins | Team Suzuki MotoGP | Suzuki | 27 | +1 lap | 7 | |
| 17 | 27 | (Italy) Franco Battaini | Blata WCM | Blata | 27 | +1 lap | 21 | |
| Ret | 4 | (Brazil) Alex Barros | Camel Honda | Honda | 12 | Accident | 11 | |
| Ret | 77 | (United Kingdom) James Ellison | Blata WCM | Blata | 2 | Accident | 20 | |
| Ret | 67 | (United Kingdom) Shane Byrne | Team Roberts | Proton KR | 0 | Accident | 17 | |
| Ret | 7 | (Spain) Carlos Checa | Ducati Marlboro Team | Ducati | 0 | Accident | 9 | |

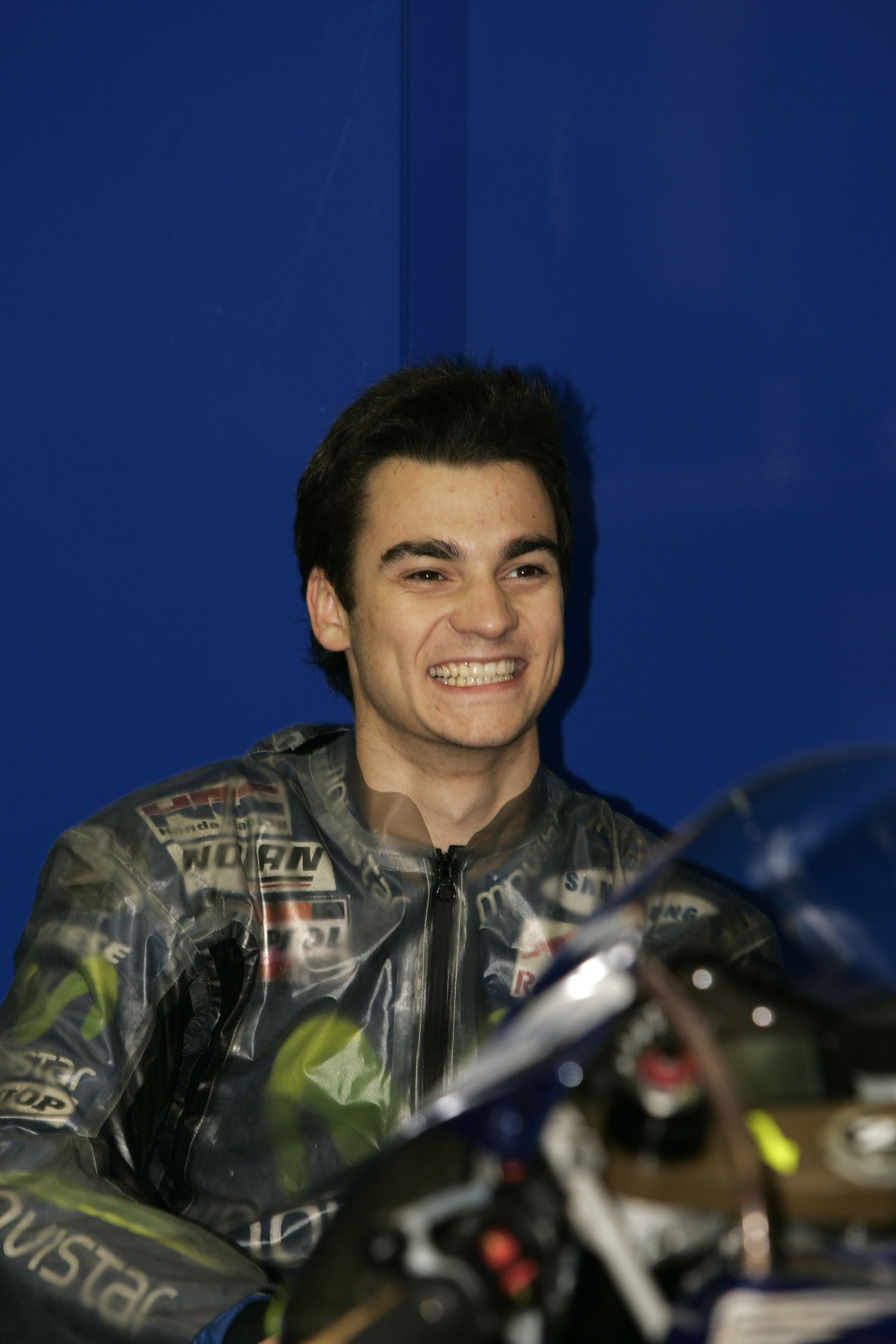
Dani Pedrosa in his pit box. He went on to win the 250cc race.

== 250 cc classification ==
| Pos. | No. | Rider | Manufacturer | Laps | Time/Retired | Grid | Points |
|---|---|---|---|---|---|---|---|
| 1 | 1 | (Spain) Daniel Pedrosa | Honda | 26 | 42:55.152 | 1 | 25 |
| 2 | 7 | (France) Randy de Puniet | Aprilia | 26 | +0.251 | 6 | 20 |
| 3 | 34 | (Italy) Andrea Dovizioso | Honda | 26 | +1.554 | 5 | 16 |
| 4 | 27 | (Australia) Casey Stoner | Aprilia | 26 | +4.230 | 2 | 13 |
| 5 | 48 | (Spain) Jorge Lorenzo | Honda | 26 | +6.027 | 3 | 11 |
| 6 | 73 | (Japan) Hiroshi Aoyama | Honda | 26 | +23.969 | 10 | 10 |
| 7 | 80 | (Spain) Héctor Barberá | Honda | 26 | +30.667 | 9 | 9 |
| 8 | 6 | (Spain) Alex Debón | Honda | 26 | +32.039 | 15 | 8 |
| 9 | 50 | (France) Sylvain Guintoli | Aprilia | 26 | +32.452 | 8 | 7 |
| 10 | 55 | (Japan) Yuki Takahashi | Honda | 26 | +37.772 | 13 | 6 |
| 11 | 24 | (Italy) Simone Corsi | Aprilia | 26 | +49.285 | 17 | 5 |
| 12 | 57 | (United Kingdom) Chaz Davies | Aprilia | 26 | +49.509 | 11 | 4 |
| 13 | 25 | (Italy) Alex Baldolini | Aprilia | 26 | +49.530 | 19 | 3 |
| 14 | 15 | (Italy) Roberto Locatelli | Aprilia | 26 | +49.771 | 16 | 2 |
| 15 | 8 | (Italy) Andrea Ballerini | Aprilia | 26 | +49.895 | 14 | 1 |
| 16 | 96 | (Czech Republic) Jakub Smrž | Honda | 26 | +1:02.122 | 12 | |
| 17 | 32 | (Italy) Mirko Giansanti | Aprilia | 26 | +1:02.612 | 18 | |
| 18 | 14 | (Australia) Anthony West | Aprilia | 26 | +1:17.358 | 25 | |
| 19 | 38 | (France) Grégory Leblanc | Aprilia | 26 | +1:17.502 | 22 | |
| 20 | 63 | (France) Erwan Nigon | Aprilia | 26 | +1:18.382 | 21 | |
| 21 | 64 | (Czech Republic) Radomil Rous | Honda | 26 | +1:22.698 | 24 | |
| 22 | 12 | (Hungary) Gábor Rizmayer | Yamaha | 25 | +1 lap | 26 | |
| Ret | 19 | (Argentina) Sebastián Porto | Aprilia | 13 | Retirement | 4 | |
| Ret | 5 | (San Marino) Alex de Angelis | Aprilia | 7 | Accident | 7 | |
| Ret | 18 | (Sweden) Fredrik Watz | Yamaha | 6 | Retirement | 27 | |
| Ret | 17 | (Germany) Steve Jenkner | Aprilia | 0 | Accident | 20 | |
| Ret | 28 | (Germany) Dirk Heidolf | Honda | 0 | Accident | 23 | |
| DNS | 9 | (France) Hugo Marchand | Aprilia | | Did not start | | |
| DNQ | 21 | (France) Arnaud Vincent | Fantic | | Did not qualify | | |
| DNQ | 65 | (France) Samuel Aubry | Honda | | Did not qualify | | |
| DNQ | 20 | (Italy) Gabriele Ferro | Fantic | | Did not qualify | | |
| DNQ | 47 | (France) Marc-Antoine Scaccia | Yamaha | | Did not qualify | | |
| DNQ | 61 | (China) Li Zheng Peng | Aprilia | | Did not qualify | | |

== 125 cc classification ==
| Pos. | No. | Rider | Manufacturer | Laps | Time/Retired | Grid | Points |
|---|---|---|---|---|---|---|---|
| 1 | 12 | (Switzerland) Thomas Lüthi | Honda | 24 | 41:52.772 | 1 | 25 |
| 2 | 33 | (Spain) Sergio Gadea | Aprilia | 24 | +3.080 | 10 | 20 |
| 3 | 36 | (Finland) Mika Kallio | KTM | 24 | +3.263 | 2 | 16 |
| 4 | 63 | (France) Mike Di Meglio | Honda | 24 | +4.237 | 9 | 13 |
| 5 | 58 | (Italy) Marco Simoncelli | Aprilia | 24 | +4.311 | 5 | 11 |
| 6 | 14 | (Hungary) Gábor Talmácsi | KTM | 24 | +4.882 | 4 | 10 |
| 7 | 22 | (Spain) Pablo Nieto | Derbi | 24 | +25.823 | 12 | 9 |
| 8 | 60 | (Spain) Julián Simón | KTM | 24 | +26.349 | 8 | 8 |
| 9 | 45 | (Hungary) Imre Tóth | Aprilia | 24 | +31.611 | 18 | 7 |
| 10 | 54 | (San Marino) Manuel Poggiali | Gilera | 24 | +32.853 | 15 | 6 |
| 11 | 8 | (Italy) Lorenzo Zanetti | Aprilia | 24 | +33.270 | 21 | 5 |
| 12 | 41 | (Spain) Aleix Espargaró | Honda | 24 | +40.620 | 23 | 4 |
| 13 | 25 | (Germany) Dario Giuseppetti | Aprilia | 24 | +43.477 | 25 | 3 |
| 14 | 43 | (Spain) Manuel Hernández | Aprilia | 24 | +45.390 | 16 | 2 |
| 15 | 11 | (Germany) Sandro Cortese | Honda | 24 | +53.924 | 19 | 1 |
| 16 | 84 | (Spain) Julián Miralles | Aprilia | 24 | +56.940 | 22 | |
| 17 | 42 | (Italy) Gioele Pellino | Malaguti | 24 | +1:01.388 | 38 | |
| 18 | 88 | (France) Matthieu Lussiana | Honda | 24 | +1:07.555 | 31 | |
| 19 | 10 | (Italy) Federico Sandi | Honda | 24 | +1:07.750 | 28 | |
| 20 | 35 | (Italy) Raffaele De Rosa | Aprilia | 24 | +1:08.159 | 29 | |
| 21 | 44 | (Czech Republic) Karel Abraham | Aprilia | 24 | +1:09.907 | 36 | |
| 22 | 18 | (Spain) Nicolás Terol | Derbi | 24 | +1:11.161 | 32 | |
| 23 | 29 | (Italy) Andrea Iannone | Aprilia | 24 | +1:16.897 | 33 | |
| 24 | 16 | (Netherlands) Raymond Schouten | Honda | 24 | +1:17.642 | 35 | |
| Ret | 32 | (Italy) Fabrizio Lai | Honda | 18 | Retirement | 7 | |
| Ret | 7 | (France) Alexis Masbou | Honda | 16 | Accident | 11 | |
| Ret | 74 | (France) Mathieu Gines | Honda | 16 | Retirement | 30 | |
| Ret | 71 | (Japan) Tomoyoshi Koyama | Honda | 15 | Retirement | 14 | |
| Ret | 89 | (France) Jules Cluzel | Honda | 15 | Accident | 24 | |
| Ret | 28 | (Spain) Jordi Carchano | Aprilia | 11 | Accident | 27 | |
| Ret | 15 | (Italy) Michele Pirro | Malaguti | 11 | Accident | 34 | |
| Ret | 26 | (Switzerland) Vincent Braillard | Aprilia | 11 | Accident | 26 | |
| Ret | 90 | (France) Alexis Michel | Honda | 10 | Accident | 39 | |
| Ret | 19 | (Spain) Álvaro Bautista | Honda | 9 | Accident | 17 | |
| Ret | 55 | (Spain) Héctor Faubel | Aprilia | 7 | Retirement | 3 | |
| Ret | 52 | (Czech Republic) Lukáš Pešek | Derbi | 6 | Accident | 6 | |
| Ret | 6 | (Spain) Joan Olivé | Aprilia | 6 | Retirement | 13 | |
| Ret | 47 | (Spain) Ángel Rodríguez | Honda | 4 | Retirement | 20 | |
| DNS | 73 | (France) Yannick Deschamps | Honda | 0 | Did not start | 37 | |
| DNS | 75 | (Italy) Mattia Pasini | Aprilia | | Did not start | | |
| DNS | 9 | (Japan) Toshihisa Kuzuhara | Honda | | Did not start | | |

== Championship standings after the race (MotoGP) ==
Below are the standings for the top five riders and constructors after round four has concluded.

Riders' Championship standings

| Pos. | Rider | Points |
|---|---|---|
| 1 | (Italy) Valentino Rossi | 95 |
| 2 | (Italy) Marco Melandri | 58 |
| 3 | (Spain) Sete Gibernau | 53 |
| 4 | (Italy) Max Biaggi | 47 |
| 5 | (Brazil) Alex Barros | 43 |

Constructors' Championship standings

| Pos. | Constructor | Points |
|---|---|---|
| 1 | (Japan) Yamaha | 95 |
| 2 | (Japan) Honda | 81 |
| 3 | (Japan) Kawasaki | 47 |
| 4 | (Italy) Ducati | 30 |
| 5 | (Japan) Suzuki | 18 |

- Note: Only the top five positions are included for both sets of standings.

| Previous race: 2005 Chinese Grand Prix | FIM Grand Prix World Championship; 2005 season | Next race: 2005 Italian Grand Prix |
| Previous race: 2004 French Grand Prix | French motorcycle Grand Prix | Next race: 2006 French Grand Prix |
