= 2005 Dutch TT =

(Netherlands) 2005 Dutch Grand Prix
Race details
- Race 7 of 17 races in the 2005 Grand Prix motorcycle racing season
- Date: 25 June 2005
- Official name: Gauloises TT Assen
- Location: TT Circuit Assen
- Course: Permanent racing facility; 5.997 km (3.726 mi)

MotoGP
Pole position
- Rider: (Italy) Valentino Rossi
- Time: 1:58.936
Fastest lap
- Rider: (Italy) Valentino Rossi
- Time: 2:00.991 on lap 19
Podium
- First: (Italy) Valentino Rossi
- Second: (Italy) Marco Melandri
- Third: (United States) Colin Edwards

250cc
Pole position
- Rider: (Spain) Jorge Lorenzo
- Time: 2:04.562
Fastest lap
- Rider: (Argentina) Sebastián Porto
- Time: 2:05.191 on lap 18
Podium
- First: (Argentina) Sebastián Porto
- Second: (Spain) Daniel Pedrosa
- Third: (Spain) Jorge Lorenzo

125cc
Pole position
- Rider: (Finland) Mika Kallio
- Time: 2:11.855
Fastest lap
- Rider: (Spain) Héctor Faubel
- Time: 2:13.536 on lap 5
Podium
- First: (Hungary) Gábor Talmácsi
- Second: (Spain) Héctor Faubel
- Third: (Italy) Mattia Pasini

The 2005 Dutch TT was the seventh round of the 2005 MotoGP Championship. It took place on the weekend of 23–25 June 2005 at the TT Circuit Assen located in Assen, Netherlands.

This was the last Dutch TT to be held in the 6-km Assen before the reconfiguration were being made.

== MotoGP classification ==
Pos.	No.	Rider	Team	Manufacturer	Laps	Time/Retired	Grid	Points
1	46	(Italy) Valentino Rossi	Gauloises Yamaha Team	Yamaha	19	38:41.808	1	25
2	33	(Italy) Marco Melandri	Movistar Honda MotoGP	Honda	19	+1.583	3	20
3	5	(United States) Colin Edwards	Gauloises Yamaha Team	Yamaha	19	+7.643	6	16
4	69	(United States) Nicky Hayden	Repsol Honda Team	Honda	19	+10.128	5	13
5	15	(Spain) Sete Gibernau	Movistar Honda MotoGP	Honda	19	+14.795	2	11
6	3	(Italy) Max Biaggi	Repsol Honda Team	Honda	19	+21.575	9	10
7	4	(Brazil) Alex Barros	Camel Honda	Honda	19	+22.725	8	9
8	56	(Japan) Shinya Nakano	Kawasaki Racing Team	Kawasaki	19	+26.477	4	8
9	7	(Spain) Carlos Checa	Ducati Marlboro Team	Ducati	19	+30.221	13	7
10	65	(Italy) Loris Capirossi	Ducati Marlboro Team	Ducati	19	+30.465	7	6
11	12	(Australia) Troy Bayliss	Camel Honda	Honda	19	+43.802	14	5
12	11	(Spain) Rubén Xaus	Fortuna Yamaha Team	Yamaha	19	+49.864	16	4
13	21	(United States) John Hopkins	Team Suzuki MotoGP	Suzuki	19	+50.830	12	3
14	6	(Japan) Makoto Tamada	Konica Minolta Honda	Honda	19	+53.370	11	2
15	94	(Spain) David Checa	Fortuna Yamaha Team	Yamaha	19	+54.965	17	1
16	10	(United States) Kenny Roberts Jr.	Team Suzuki MotoGP	Suzuki	19	+1:06.939	15	
17	67	(United Kingdom) Shane Byrne	Team Roberts	Proton KR	19	+1:06.999	19	
18	44	(Italy) Roberto Rolfo	Team d'Antin Pramac	Ducati	19	+1:29.048	18	
19	77	(United Kingdom) James Ellison	Blata WCM	Blata	19	+1:43.768	20	
20	27	(Italy) Franco Battaini	Blata WCM	Blata	18	+1 lap	21	
Ret	66	(Germany) Alex Hofmann	Kawasaki Racing Team	Kawasaki	13	Retirement	10	

== 250 cc classification ==
Pos.	No.	Rider	Manufacturer	Laps	Time/Retired	Grid	Points
1	19	(Argentina) Sebastián Porto	Aprilia	18	38:02.148	2	25
2	1	(Spain) Daniel Pedrosa	Honda	18	+0.381	3	20
3	48	(Spain) Jorge Lorenzo	Honda	18	+1.232	1	16
4	73	(Japan) Hiroshi Aoyama	Honda	18	+11.757	6	13
5	5	(San Marino) Alex de Angelis	Aprilia	18	+12.017	5	11
6	27	(Australia) Casey Stoner	Aprilia	18	+12.026	4	10
7	34	(Italy) Andrea Dovizioso	Honda	18	+12.354	7	9
8	7	(France) Randy de Puniet	Aprilia	18	+13.935	9	8
9	80	(Spain) Héctor Barberá	Honda	18	+14.406	8	7
10	24	(Italy) Simone Corsi	Aprilia	18	+29.294	10	6
11	15	(Italy) Roberto Locatelli	Aprilia	18	+53.684	20	5
12	50	(France) Sylvain Guintoli	Aprilia	18	+55.365	17	4
13	6	(Spain) Alex Debón	Honda	18	+55.366	21	3
14	57	(United Kingdom) Chaz Davies	Aprilia	18	+55.627	12	2
15	55	(Japan) Yuki Takahashi	Honda	18	+55.913	13	1
16	96	(Czech Republic) Jakub Smrž	Honda	18	+55.974	11	
17	8	(Italy) Andrea Ballerini	Aprilia	18	+58.837	19	
18	32	(Italy) Mirko Giansanti	Aprilia	18	+1:12.101	15	
19	28	(Germany) Dirk Heidolf	Honda	18	+1:12.202	18	
20	38	(France) Grégory Leblanc	Aprilia	18	+1:25.107	22	
21	36	(Colombia) Martín Cárdenas	Aprilia	18	+1:25.193	25	
22	45	(Italy) Michele Danese	Aprilia	18	+1:32.360	26	
23	66	(Netherlands) Hans Smees	Aprilia	18	+1:41.190	28	
24	21	(France) Arnaud Vincent	Fantic	18	+1:54.581	24	
25	12	(Hungary) Gábor Rizmayer	Yamaha	18	+1:55.648	29	
Ret	25	(Italy) Alex Baldolini	Aprilia	12	Retirement	16	
Ret	14	(Australia) Anthony West	Honda	12	Retirement	23	
Ret	17	(Germany) Steve Jenkner	Aprilia	3	Accident	14	
DNS	67	(Netherlands) Randy Gevers	Aprilia	0	Did not start	27	
DNQ	68	(Netherlands) Jan Roelofs	Yamaha		Did not qualify		
DNQ	22	(Bulgaria) Alexander Todorov	Yamaha		Did not qualify		
DNQ	20	(Italy) Gabriele Ferro	Fantic		Did not qualify		
DNQ	69	(Netherlands) Mike Velthuijzen	Honda		Did not qualify		

== 125 cc classification ==
Pos.	No.	Rider	Manufacturer	Laps	Time/Retired	Grid	Points
1	14	(Hungary) Gábor Talmácsi	KTM	17	38:09.487	2	25
2	55	(Spain) Héctor Faubel	Aprilia	17	+0.657	9	20
3	75	(Italy) Mattia Pasini	Aprilia	17	+0.801	3	16
4	19	(Spain) Álvaro Bautista	Honda	17	+0.847	14	13
5	7	(France) Alexis Masbou	Honda	17	+1.403	8	11
6	60	(Spain) Julián Simón	KTM	17	+3.972	10	10
7	71	(Japan) Tomoyoshi Koyama	Honda	17	+4.259	11	9
8	54	(San Marino) Manuel Poggiali	Gilera	17	+4.323	7	8
9	33	(Spain) Sergio Gadea	Aprilia	17	+4.492	6	7
10	12	(Switzerland) Thomas Lüthi	Honda	17	+13.934	5	6
11	22	(Spain) Pablo Nieto	Derbi	17	+18.262	23	5
12	76	(Austria) Michael Ranseder	KTM	17	+20.693	17	4
13	6	(Spain) Joan Olivé	Aprilia	17	+21.091	16	3
14	63	(France) Mike Di Meglio	Honda	17	+21.196	13	2
15	52	(Czech Republic) Lukáš Pešek	Derbi	17	+21.304	12	1
16	18	(Spain) Nicolás Terol	Derbi	17	+21.439	22	
17	43	(Spain) Manuel Hernández	Aprilia	17	+21.574	15	
18	32	(Italy) Fabrizio Lai	Honda	17	+21.575	18	
19	8	(Italy) Lorenzo Zanetti	Aprilia	17	+30.737	26	
20	58	(Italy) Marco Simoncelli	Aprilia	17	+37.546	4	
21	42	(Italy) Gioele Pellino	Malaguti	17	+37.777	36	
22	47	(Spain) Ángel Rodríguez	Honda	17	+37.843	28	
23	25	(Germany) Dario Giuseppetti	Aprilia	17	+40.976	33	
24	11	(Germany) Sandro Cortese	Honda	17	+41.021	24	
25	45	(Hungary) Imre Tóth	Aprilia	17	+50.079	30	
26	29	(Italy) Andrea Iannone	Aprilia	17	+51.815	21	
27	26	(Switzerland) Vincent Braillard	Aprilia	17	+51.862	35	
28	28	(Spain) Jordi Carchano	Aprilia	17	+55.996	34	
29	79	(Netherlands) Gert-Jan Kok	Honda	17	+1:15.161	40	
30	37	(Netherlands) Joey Litjens	Honda	17	+1:43.235	38	
31	78	(Netherlands) Hugo van den Berg	Aprilia	17	+1:50.080	39	
Ret	16	(Netherlands) Raymond Schouten	Honda	14	Retirement	25	
Ret	36	(Finland) Mika Kallio	KTM	13	Accident	1	
Ret	46	(Spain) Mateo Túnez	Aprilia	9	Retirement	37	
Ret	35	(Italy) Raffaele De Rosa	Aprilia	6	Retirement	19	
Ret	15	(Italy) Michele Pirro	Malaguti	3	Retirement	32	
Ret	41	(Spain) Aleix Espargaró	Honda	1	Accident	20	
Ret	10	(Italy) Federico Sandi	Honda	1	Accident	31	
Ret	9	(Japan) Toshihisa Kuzuhara	Honda	1	Retirement	27	
Ret	44	(Czech Republic) Karel Abraham	Aprilia	0	Accident	29	
DNQ	80	(Netherlands) Mark van Kreij	Honda		Did not qualify		

== Championship standings after the race (MotoGP) ==
Below are the standings for the top five riders and constructors after round seven has concluded.

Riders' Championship standings

Pos.	Rider	Points
1	(Italy) Valentino Rossi	170
2	(Italy) Marco Melandri	107
3	(Italy) Max Biaggi	87
4	(Spain) Sete Gibernau	84
5	(Brazil) Alex Barros	74

Constructors' Championship standings

Pos.	Constructor	Points
1	(Japan) Yamaha	170
2	(Japan) Honda	141
3	(Japan) Kawasaki	68
4	(Italy) Ducati	58
5	(Japan) Suzuki	27

- Note: Only the top five positions are included for both sets of standings.

Previous race: 2005 Catalan Grand Prix	FIM Grand Prix World Championship; 2005 season	Next race: 2005 United States Grand Prix
Previous race: 2004 Dutch TT	Dutch TT	Next race: 2006 Dutch TT
