= 2005 British motorcycle Grand Prix =

(United Kingdom) 2005 British Grand Prix
Race details
- Race 9 of 17 races in the 2005 Grand Prix motorcycle racing season
- Date: 24 July 2005
- Official name: betandwin.com British Grand Prix
- Location: Donington Park
- Course: Permanent racing facility; 4.023 km (2.500 mi)

MotoGP
Pole position
- Rider: (Italy) Valentino Rossi
- Time: 1:27.897
Fastest lap
- Rider: (Italy) Valentino Rossi
- Time: 1:45.377 on lap 24
Podium
- First: (Italy) Valentino Rossi
- Second: (United States) Kenny Roberts Jr.
- Third: (Brazil) Alex Barros

250cc
Pole position
- Rider: (Spain) Daniel Pedrosa
- Time: 1:31.834
Fastest lap
- Rider: (Australia) Anthony West
- Time: 1:47.025 on lap 17
Podium
- First: (France) Randy de Puniet
- Second: (Australia) Anthony West
- Third: (Australia) Casey Stoner

125cc
Pole position
- Rider: (Finland) Mika Kallio
- Time: 1:37.295
Fastest lap
- Rider: (Spain) Álvaro Bautista
- Time: 1:38.408 on lap 6 (first part)
Podium
- First: (Spain) Julián Simón
- Second: (France) Mike Di Meglio
- Third: (Italy) Fabrizio Lai

The 2005 British motorcycle Grand Prix was the ninth round of the 2005 MotoGP Championship. It took place on the weekend of 22–24 July 2005 at the Donington Park circuit. It was also marked the final victory of Valentino Rossi in the wet race at the British circuit until the 2015 event was held at the Silverstone Circuit.

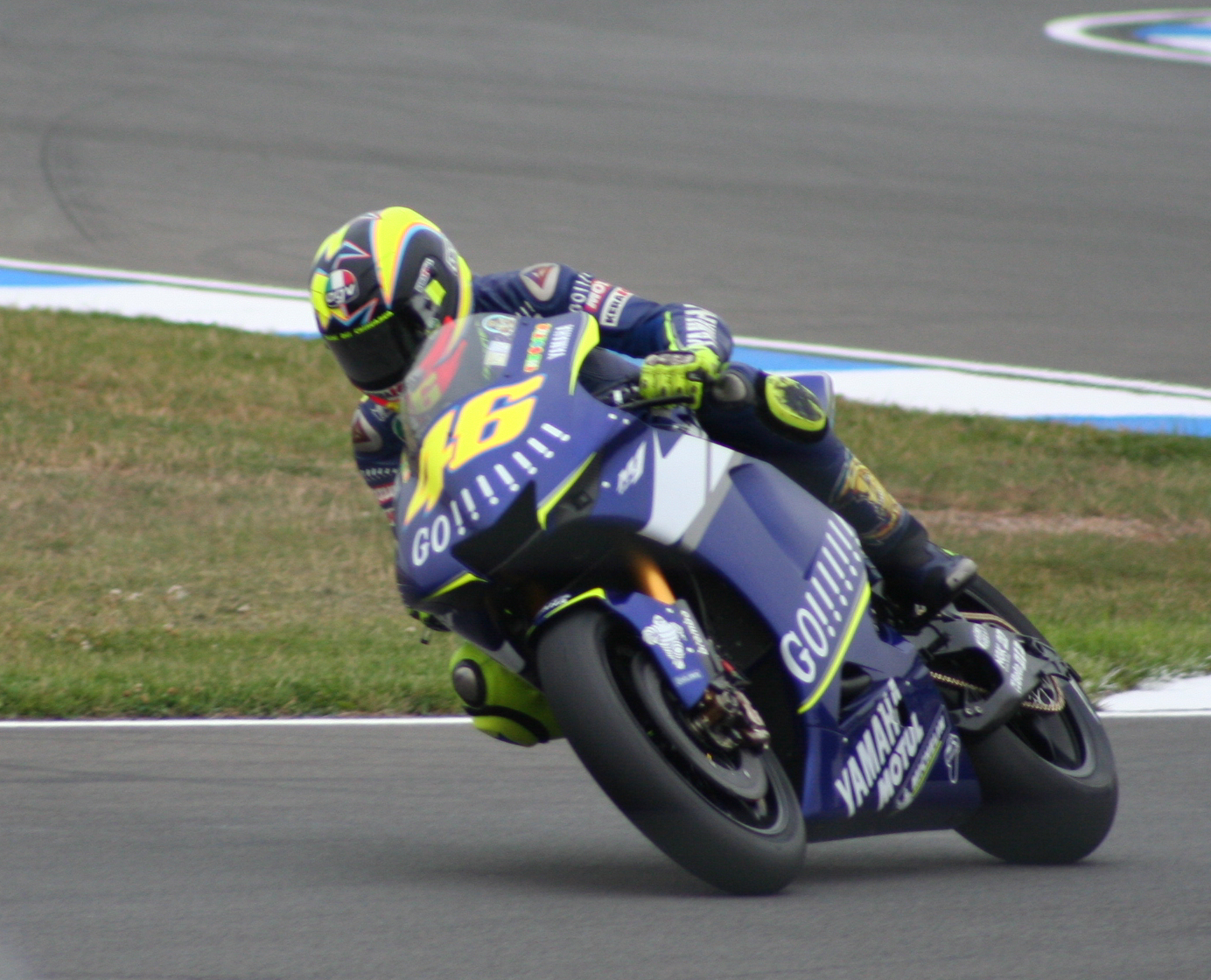
Valentino Rossi, riding his Yamaha in the MotoGP race. Rossi went on to win the race.

== MotoGP classification ==
Pos.	No.	Rider	Team	Manufacturer	Laps	Time/Retired	Grid	Points
1	46	(Italy) Valentino Rossi	Gauloises Yamaha Team	Yamaha	29	52:58.675	1	25
2	10	(United States) Kenny Roberts Jr.	Team Suzuki MotoGP	Suzuki	29	+3.169	16	20
3	4	(Brazil) Alex Barros	Camel Honda	Honda	29	+4.006	4	16
4	5	(United States) Colin Edwards	Gauloises Yamaha Team	Yamaha	29	+10.292	6	13
5	7	(Spain) Carlos Checa	Ducati Marlboro Team	Ducati	29	+13.020	13	11
6	65	(Italy) Loris Capirossi	Ducati Marlboro Team	Ducati	29	+23.321	11	10
7	6	(Japan) Makoto Tamada	Konica Minolta Honda	Honda	29	+37.833	9	9
8	66	(Germany) Alex Hofmann	Kawasaki Racing Team	Kawasaki	29	+44.617	15	8
9	24	(Spain) Toni Elías	Fortuna Yamaha Team	Yamaha	28	+1 lap	17	7
10	44	(Italy) Roberto Rolfo	Team d'Antin Pramac	Ducati	28	+1 lap	19	6
11	21	(United States) John Hopkins	Team Suzuki MotoGP	Suzuki	27	+2 laps	10	5
Ret	27	(Italy) Franco Battaini	Blata WCM	Blata	25	Accident	21	
Ret	77	(United Kingdom) James Ellison	Blata WCM	Blata	7	Accident	20	
Ret	67	(United Kingdom) Shane Byrne	Team Roberts	Proton KR	4	Accident	18	
Ret	15	(Spain) Sete Gibernau	Movistar Honda MotoGP	Honda	3	Accident	2	
Ret	56	(Japan) Shinya Nakano	Kawasaki Racing Team	Kawasaki	3	Accident	12	
Ret	3	(Italy) Max Biaggi	Repsol Honda Team	Honda	3	Accident	8	
Ret	33	(Italy) Marco Melandri	Movistar Honda MotoGP	Honda	2	Accident	3	
Ret	12	(Australia) Troy Bayliss	Camel Honda	Honda	2	Accident	7	
Ret	69	(United States) Nicky Hayden	Repsol Honda Team	Honda	2	Retirement	5	
Ret	11	(Spain) Rubén Xaus	Fortuna Yamaha Team	Yamaha	1	Accident	14	

== 250 cc classification ==
Pos.	No.	Rider	Manufacturer	Laps	Time/Retired	Grid	Points
1	7	(France) Randy de Puniet	Aprilia	27	49:11.337	6	25
2	14	(Australia) Anthony West	KTM	27	+1.236	15	20
3	27	(Australia) Casey Stoner	Aprilia	27	+16.740	10	16
4	1	(Spain) Daniel Pedrosa	Honda	27	+47.825	1	13
5	19	(Argentina) Sebastián Porto	Aprilia	27	+1:03.449	5	11
6	24	(Italy) Simone Corsi	Aprilia	27	+1:32.437	14	10
7	34	(Italy) Andrea Dovizioso	Honda	27	+1:34.560	4	9
8	48	(Spain) Jorge Lorenzo	Honda	27	+1:45.964	2	8
9	50	(France) Sylvain Guintoli	Aprilia	26	+1 lap	12	7
10	8	(Italy) Andrea Ballerini	Aprilia	26	+1 lap	20	6
11	32	(Italy) Mirko Giansanti	Aprilia	26	+1 lap	22	5
12	15	(Italy) Roberto Locatelli	Aprilia	26	+1 lap	11	4
13	25	(Italy) Alex Baldolini	Aprilia	26	+1 lap	19	3
14	38	(France) Grégory Leblanc	Aprilia	25	+2 laps	24	2
15	64	(Czech Republic) Radomil Rous	Honda	25	+2 laps	25	1
16	96	(Czech Republic) Jakub Smrž	Honda	25	+2 laps	17	
17	17	(Germany) Steve Jenkner	Aprilia	25	+2 laps	18	
18	41	(Spain) Álvaro Molina	Aprilia	25	+2 laps	29	
19	20	(Italy) Gabriele Ferro	Fantic	23	+4 laps	31	
Ret	57	(United Kingdom) Chaz Davies	Aprilia	22	Accident	16	
Ret	44	(Japan) Taro Sekiguchi	Aprilia	21	Accident	26	
Ret	80	(Spain) Héctor Barberá	Honda	16	Accident	7	
Ret	73	(Japan) Hiroshi Aoyama	Honda	12	Accident	8	
Ret	42	(Austria) Yves Polzer	Aprilia	12	Accident	28	
Ret	5	(San Marino) Alex de Angelis	Aprilia	8	Accident	3	
Ret	36	(Colombia) Martín Cárdenas	Aprilia	4	Retirement	23	
Ret	28	(Germany) Dirk Heidolf	Honda	2	Retirement	21	
Ret	21	(France) Arnaud Vincent	Fantic	0	Retirement	27	
Ret	55	(Japan) Yuki Takahashi	Honda	0	Retirement	9	
Ret	6	(Spain) Alex Debón	Honda	0	Retirement	13	
DSQ	26	(Sweden) Andreas Mårtensson	Yamaha	10	Black flag	30	
DNQ	23	(Sweden) Nicklas Cajback	Yamaha		Did not qualify		

== 125 cc classification ==
The race, scheduled to be run for 25 laps, was stopped after 7 full laps due to heavy rain. It was later restarted for 9 laps, with the grid determined by the running order before the suspension. The second part of the race determined the final result.

Pos.	No.	Rider	Manufacturer	Laps	Time/Retired	Grid	Points
1	60	(Spain) Julián Simón	KTM	9	17:35.523	6	25
2	63	(France) Mike Di Meglio	Honda	9	+2.406	9	20
3	32	(Italy) Fabrizio Lai	Honda	9	+8.896	5	16
4	58	(Italy) Marco Simoncelli	Aprilia	9	+9.169	3	13
5	22	(Spain) Pablo Nieto	Derbi	9	+13.837	17	11
6	12	(Switzerland) Thomas Lüthi	Honda	9	+18.323	4	10
7	36	(Finland) Mika Kallio	KTM	9	+23.453	1	9
8	6	(Spain) Joan Olivé	Aprilia	9	+31.424	15	8
9	94	(United Kingdom) Dan Linfoot	Honda	9	+33.865	39	7
10	9	(Japan) Toshihisa Kuzuhara	Honda	9	+40.094	30	6
11	33	(Spain) Sergio Gadea	Aprilia	9	+40.345	14	5
12	56	(United Kingdom) Christian Elkin	Honda	9	+40.761	41	4
13	28	(Spain) Jordi Carchano	Aprilia	9	+42.789	26	3
14	8	(Italy) Lorenzo Zanetti	Aprilia	9	+42.833	27	2
15	11	(Germany) Sandro Cortese	Honda	9	+43.420	28	1
16	16	(Netherlands) Raymond Schouten	Honda	9	+43.587	25	
17	44	(Czech Republic) Karel Abraham	Aprilia	9	+45.101	36	
18	42	(Italy) Gioele Pellino	Malaguti	9	+47.077	38	
19	10	(Italy) Federico Sandi	Honda	9	+48.901	31	
20	35	(Italy) Raffaele De Rosa	Aprilia	9	+49.088	21	
21	18	(Spain) Nicolás Terol	Derbi	9	+54.566	18	
22	95	(United Kingdom) James Westmoreland	Honda	9	+59.769	37	
23	26	(Switzerland) Vincent Braillard	Aprilia	9	+1:00.672	33	
24	46	(Spain) Mateo Túnez	Aprilia	9	+1:02.134	24	
25	54	(San Marino) Manuel Poggiali	Gilera	9	+1:26.419	11	
26	45	(Hungary) Imre Tóth	Aprilia	9	+1:28.411	34	
Ret	7	(France) Alexis Masbou	Honda	8	Accident	10	
Ret	19	(Spain) Álvaro Bautista	Honda	5	Accident	12	
Ret	41	(Spain) Aleix Espargaró	Honda	5	Retirement	19	
Ret	14	(Hungary) Gábor Talmácsi	KTM	4	Accident	7	
Ret	57	(United Kingdom) Rob Guiver	Honda	3	Accident	40	
Ret	52	(Czech Republic) Lukáš Pešek	Derbi	1	Retirement	20	
Ret	15	(Italy) Michele Pirro	Malaguti	0	Accident	32	
Ret	29	(Italy) Andrea Iannone	Aprilia	0	Accident	22	
Ret	43	(Spain) Manuel Hernández	Aprilia	0	Retirement	16	
Ret	75	(Italy) Mattia Pasini	Aprilia	0	Did not restart	2	
Ret	71	(Japan) Tomoyoshi Koyama	Honda	0	Accident in 1st part	8	
Ret	55	(Spain) Héctor Faubel	Aprilia	0	Accident in 1st part	13	
Ret	47	(Spain) Ángel Rodríguez	Honda	0	Retirement in 1st part	23	
Ret	96	(United Kingdom) Kev Coghlan	Honda	0	Retirement in 1st part	35	
DNS	25	(Germany) Dario Giuseppetti	Aprilia	0	Did not start 1st part	29	

== Championship standings after the race (MotoGP) ==
Below are the standings for the top five riders and constructors after round nine has concluded.

Riders' Championship standings

Pos.	Rider	Points
1	(Italy) Valentino Rossi	211
2	(Italy) Marco Melandri	107
3	(United States) Colin Edwards	106
4	(Italy) Max Biaggi	100
5	(Spain) Sete Gibernau	95

Constructors' Championship standings

Pos.	Constructor	Points
1	(Japan) Yamaha	215
2	(Japan) Honda	182
3	(Japan) Kawasaki	83
4	(Italy) Ducati	75
5	(Japan) Suzuki	55

- Note: Only the top five positions are included for both sets of standings.

Previous race: 2005 United States Grand Prix	FIM Grand Prix World Championship; 2005 season	Next race: 2005 German Grand Prix
Previous race: 2004 British Grand Prix	British motorcycle Grand Prix	Next race: 2006 British Grand Prix
