= 2005 Portuguese motorcycle Grand Prix =

(Portugal) 2005 Portuguese Grand Prix
Race details
- Race 2 of 17 races in the 2005 Grand Prix motorcycle racing season
- Date: 17 April 2005
- Official name: betandwin.com Grande Prémio Portugal
- Location: Autódromo do Estoril
- Course: Permanent racing facility; 4.182 km (2.599 mi)

MotoGP
Pole position
- Rider: (Brazil) Alex Barros
- Time: 1:37.202
Fastest lap
- Rider: (Brazil) Alex Barros
- Time: 1:38.480 on lap 7
Podium
- First: (Brazil) Alex Barros
- Second: (Italy) Valentino Rossi
- Third: (Italy) Max Biaggi

250cc
Pole position
- Rider: (France) Randy de Puniet
- Time: 1:41.104
Fastest lap
- Rider: (San Marino) Alex de Angelis
- Time: 1:43.484 on lap 16
Podium
- First: (Australia) Casey Stoner
- Second: (Italy) Andrea Dovizioso
- Third: (France) Randy de Puniet

125cc
Pole position
- Rider: (Finland) Mika Kallio
- Time: 1:45.279
Fastest lap
- Rider: (Spain) Héctor Faubel
- Time: 1:46.654 on lap 12
Podium
- First: (Finland) Mika Kallio
- Second: (Spain) Héctor Faubel
- Third: (Switzerland) Thomas Lüthi

The 2005 Portuguese motorcycle Grand Prix was the second round of the 2005 MotoGP Championship. It took place on the weekend of 15–17 April 2005 at the Autódromo do Estoril. Alex Barros won the MotoGP race, his last career victory, as well the last victory for a Brazilian rider until then.

== MotoGP classification ==
Pos.	No.	Rider	Team	Manufacturer	Laps	Time/Retired	Grid	Points
1	4	(Brazil) Alex Barros	Camel Honda	Honda	28	47:14.053	1	25
2	46	(Italy) Valentino Rossi	Gauloises Yamaha Team	Yamaha	28	+2.771	4	20
3	3	(Italy) Max Biaggi	Repsol Honda Team	Honda	28	+6.071	8	16
4	33	(Italy) Marco Melandri	Movistar Honda MotoGP	Honda	28	+29.546	5	13
5	7	(Spain) Carlos Checa	Ducati Marlboro Team	Ducati	28	+29.774	3	11
6	5	(United States) Colin Edwards	Gauloises Yamaha Team	Yamaha	28	+44.216	7	10
7	69	(United States) Nicky Hayden	Repsol Honda Team	Honda	28	+57.121	9	9
8	56	(Japan) Shinya Nakano	Kawasaki Racing Team	Kawasaki	28	+59.847	10	8
9	65	(Italy) Loris Capirossi	Ducati Marlboro Team	Ducati	28	+1:07.718	6	7
10	11	(Spain) Rubén Xaus	Fortuna Yamaha Team	Yamaha	28	+1:22.431	12	6
11	12	(Australia) Troy Bayliss	Camel Honda	Honda	28	+1:33.529	13	5
12	10	(United States) Kenny Roberts Jr.	Team Suzuki MotoGP	Suzuki	28	+1:34.051	14	4
13	44	(Italy) Roberto Rolfo	D'Antin MotoGP – Pramac	Ducati	28	+1:35.956	16	3
14	24	(Spain) Toni Elías	Fortuna Yamaha Team	Yamaha	28	+1:36.492	15	2
15	77	(United Kingdom) James Ellison	Blata WCM	Blata	26	+2 laps	17	1
16	67	(United Kingdom) Shane Byrne	Team Roberts	Proton KR	24	+4 laps	18	
Ret	15	(Spain) Sete Gibernau	Movistar Honda MotoGP	Honda	16	Accident	2	
Ret	21	(United States) John Hopkins	Team Suzuki MotoGP	Suzuki	16	Accident	11	
Ret	27	(Italy) Franco Battaini	Blata WCM	Blata	8	Retirement	19	
DNS	6	(Japan) Makoto Tamada	Konica Minolta Honda	Honda		Did not start		

== 250 cc classification ==
Pos.	No.	Rider	Manufacturer	Laps	Time/Retired	Grid	Points
1	27	(Australia) Casey Stoner	Aprilia	26	45:36.009	12	25
2	34	(Italy) Andrea Dovizioso	Honda	26	+0.404	4	20
3	7	(France) Randy de Puniet	Aprilia	26	+0.431	1	16
4	1	(Spain) Daniel Pedrosa	Honda	26	+2.009	3	13
5	5	(San Marino) Alex de Angelis	Aprilia	26	+2.204	6	11
6	73	(Japan) Hiroshi Aoyama	Honda	26	+17.855	7	10
7	55	(Japan) Yuki Takahashi	Honda	26	+17.914	11	9
8	50	(France) Sylvain Guintoli	Aprilia	26	+23.810	13	8
9	19	(Argentina) Sebastián Porto	Aprilia	26	+26.407	2	7
10	48	(Spain) Jorge Lorenzo	Honda	26	+45.921	8	6
11	80	(Spain) Héctor Barberá	Honda	26	+51.533	5	5
12	96	(Czech Republic) Jakub Smrž	Honda	26	+56.920	14	4
13	6	(Spain) Alex Debón	Honda	26	+1:04.103	16	3
14	32	(Italy) Mirko Giansanti	Aprilia	26	+1:09.512	17	2
15	36	(Colombia) Martín Cárdenas	Aprilia	26	+1:18.508	26	1
16	28	(Germany) Dirk Heidolf	Honda	26	+1:23.940	21	
17	24	(Italy) Simone Corsi	Aprilia	26	+1:26.950	10	
18	8	(Italy) Andrea Ballerini	Aprilia	26	+1:27.179	24	
19	64	(Czech Republic) Radomil Rous	Honda	26	+1:27.332	19	
20	12	(Hungary) Gábor Rizmayer	Yamaha	25	+1 lap	25	
21	42	(Austria) Yves Polzer	Aprilia	24	+2 laps	27	
Ret	57	(United Kingdom) Chaz Davies	Aprilia	19	Accident	15	
Ret	38	(France) Grégory Leblanc	Aprilia	10	Accident	23	
Ret	25	(Italy) Alex Baldolini	Aprilia	9	Retirement	18	
Ret	15	(Italy) Roberto Locatelli	Aprilia	8	Accident	9	
Ret	41	(Spain) Álvaro Molina	Aprilia	7	Retirement	20	
Ret	21	(France) Arnaud Vincent	Fantic	4	Retirement	28	
Ret	9	(France) Hugo Marchand	Aprilia	0	Retirement	22	
DNQ	16	(Germany) Franz Aschenbrenner	Yamaha		Did not qualify		
DNQ	20	(Italy) Gabriele Ferro	Fantic		Did not qualify		
WD	17	(Germany) Steve Jenkner	Aprilia		Withdrew		

== 125 cc classification ==
Pos.	No.	Rider	Manufacturer	Laps	Time/Retired	Grid	Points
1	36	(Finland) Mika Kallio	KTM	23	41:19.431	1	25
2	55	(Spain) Héctor Faubel	Aprilia	23	+0.008	4	20
3	12	(Switzerland) Thomas Lüthi	Honda	23	+2.898	2	16
4	32	(Italy) Fabrizio Lai	Honda	23	+2.940	8	13
5	54	(San Marino) Manuel Poggiali	Gilera	23	+11.276	10	11
6	71	(Japan) Tomoyoshi Koyama	Honda	23	+13.543	16	10
7	19	(Spain) Álvaro Bautista	Honda	23	+13.547	11	9
8	75	(Italy) Mattia Pasini	Aprilia	23	+14.493	7	8
9	60	(Spain) Julián Simón	KTM	23	+14.710	9	7
10	58	(Italy) Marco Simoncelli	Aprilia	23	+15.194	3	6
11	63	(France) Mike Di Meglio	Honda	23	+15.208	12	5
12	22	(Spain) Pablo Nieto	Derbi	23	+36.518	14	4
13	7	(France) Alexis Masbou	Honda	23	+36.858	20	3
14	9	(Japan) Toshihisa Kuzuhara	Honda	23	+36.917	15	2
15	43	(Spain) Manuel Hernández	Aprilia	23	+37.025	13	1
16	41	(Spain) Aleix Espargaró	Honda	23	+37.073	17	
17	28	(Spain) Jordi Carchano	Aprilia	23	+54.909	24	
18	6	(Spain) Joan Olivé	Aprilia	23	+56.816	18	
19	15	(Italy) Michele Pirro	Malaguti	23	+59.761	22	
20	33	(Spain) Sergio Gadea	Aprilia	23	+1:01.246	23	
21	47	(Spain) Ángel Rodríguez	Honda	23	+1:01.344	33	
22	45	(Hungary) Imre Tóth	Aprilia	23	+1:04.776	21	
23	18	(Spain) Nicolás Terol	Derbi	23	+1:10.415	25	
24	35	(Italy) Raffaele De Rosa	Aprilia	23	+1:10.515	29	
25	11	(Germany) Sandro Cortese	Honda	23	+1:10.677	19	
26	29	(Italy) Andrea Iannone	Aprilia	23	+1:11.309	28	
27	10	(Italy) Federico Sandi	Honda	23	+1:11.362	26	
28	84	(Spain) Julián Miralles	Aprilia	23	+1:13.203	27	
29	25	(Germany) Dario Giuseppetti	Aprilia	23	+1:14.968	31	
30	16	(Netherlands) Raymond Schouten	Honda	23	+1:18.257	32	
31	26	(Switzerland) Vincent Braillard	Aprilia	23	+1:18.879	30	
32	87	(Czech Republic) Patrik Vostárek	Honda	22	+1 lap	35	
Ret	44	(Czech Republic) Karel Abraham	Aprilia	12	Retirement	34	
Ret	14	(Hungary) Gábor Talmácsi	KTM	2	Accident	6	
Ret	52	(Czech Republic) Lukáš Pešek	Derbi	2	Retirement	5	
DNS	8	(Italy) Lorenzo Zanetti	Aprilia		Did not start		
DNQ	31	(Germany) Sascha Hommel	Malaguti		Did not qualify		
DNQ	50	(Portugal) Carlos Ferreira	Honda		Did not qualify		

== Championship standings after the race (MotoGP) ==
Below are the standings for the top five riders and constructors after round two has concluded.

Riders' Championship standings

Pos.	Rider	Points
1	(Italy) Valentino Rossi	45
2	(Brazil) Alex Barros	38
3	(Italy) Marco Melandri	29
4	(Italy) Max Biaggi	25
5	(Spain) Sete Gibernau	20

Constructors' Championship standings

Pos.	Constructor	Points
1	(Japan) Honda	45
2	(Japan) Yamaha	45
3	(Japan) Kawasaki	19
4	(Italy) Ducati	17
5	(Japan) Suzuki	6

- Note: Only the top five positions are included for both sets of standings.

Previous race: 2005 Spanish Grand Prix	FIM Grand Prix World Championship; 2005 season	Next race: 2005 Chinese Grand Prix
Previous race: 2004 Portuguese Grand Prix	Portuguese motorcycle Grand Prix	Next race: 2006 Portuguese Grand Prix
