= Doni Tata Pradita =

Indonesian motorcycle racer

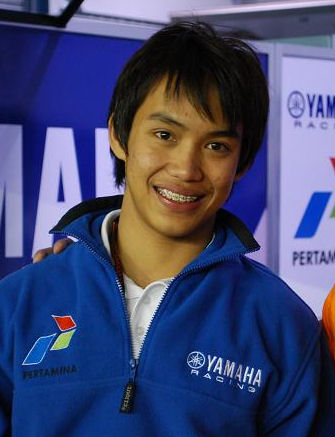
- Doni Tata Pradita in 250cc 2008
- Nationality: Indonesian
- Born: 21 January 1990 (age 36); Sleman, Special Region of Yogyakarta, Indonesia
Motorcycle racing career statistics
Moto2 World Championship
Active years	2013
Manufacturers	Suter
Championships	0
2013 championship position	28th (1 pt)
Starts / Wins / Podiums / Poles / F. laps / Points; 16 / 0 / 0 / 0 / 0 / 1
250cc World Championship
Active years	2007–2008
Manufacturers	Yamaha
Championships	0
2008 championship position	28th (1 pt)
Starts / Wins / Podiums / Poles / F. laps / Points; 17 / 0 / 0 / 0 / 0 / 1
125cc World Championship
Active years	2005–2006
Manufacturers	Yamaha
Championships	0
2006 championship position	NC (0 pts)
Starts / Wins / Podiums / Poles / F. laps / Points; 2 / 0 / 0 / 0 / 0 / 0
Supersport World Championship
Active years	2009
Manufacturers	Yamaha
Championships	0
2009 championship position	25th (8 pts)
Starts / Wins / Podiums / Poles / F. laps / Points; 12 / 0 / 0 / 0 / 0 / 8

Doni Tata Pradita (born 21 January 1990) is an Indonesian motorcycle racer who raced in the 2013 Moto2 World Championship. In 2008, he raced for Yamaha Pertamina Indonesia Team in the 250cc Grand Prix World Championship. Doni is the first Indonesian rider ever to participate in a 250cc Grand Prix World Championship race.

== Career ==
=== Early years ===
Pradita was born in Sleman, Special Region of Yogyakarta, and appeared in underbone motorcycle racing in Indonesia from an early age. He won two consecutive championships (2003, 2004) in the Novice Class of the Yamaha Regional Under 110cc 4T race series, the Yamaha Asian Cup.

=== 125cc, 250cc World Championships ===
Pradita got wildcard appearances from 2005 to 2007 in the 125 and 250cc class, with his first coming at the 2005 Malaysian Grand Prix. In 2007, he took part in the GP250 class of the All Japan Road Race Championship. In 2008, Pradita raced in the 250cc Grand Prix World Championship and managed to score one point from 16 races.

=== Supersport World Championship ===
In 2009, Pradita took part in the Supersport World Championship with YZF Yamaha Team and scored 8 points from 12 races.

=== Moto2 World Championship ===
After three years in the Asia Road Racing Championship, where he won the 2012 Asian Supersport Championship, Pradita signed a contract with Federal Oil Gresini Moto2 for 2013. He was ranked 28th in the final standings.

=== Comeback to Racing ===
Pradita made a return to motor racing on international level after four years of absence by competing in 2017 Suzuka 4 Hours. He rode for Akeno Speed Yamaha Team, aboard a Yamaha YZF-R6 with local Japanese rider Soichiro Minamimoto. The pair finished second in the race.

== Career statistics ==
=== Grand Prix motorcycle racing ===
==== By season ====
Season	Class	Motorcycle	Team	Number	Race	Win	Pod	Pole	FLap	Pts	Plcd	WCh
2005	125cc	Yamaha	Yamaha Indonesia	72	1	0	0	0	0	0	NC	0
2006	125cc	Yamaha	Yamaha Indonesia	80	1	0	0	0	0	0	NC	0
2007	250cc	Yamaha	Yamaha Indonesia Pertamina RT	35	1	0	0	0	0	0	NC	0
2008	250cc	Yamaha	Yamaha Indonesia Pertamina	45	16	0	0	0	0	1	28th	0
2013	Moto2	Suter	Federal Oil Gresini Moto2	7	16	0	0	0	0	1	28th	0
Total					35	0	0	0	0	2		0

==== By class ====
Class	Seasons	1st GP	1st Pod	1st Win	Race	Win	Podiums	Pole	FLap	Pts	WChmp
125cc	2005–2006	2005 Malaysia			2	0	0	0	0	0	0
250cc	2007–2008	2007 Malaysia			17	0	0	0	0	1	0
Moto2	2013	2013 Qatar			16	0	0	0	0	1	0
Total	2005–2008, 2013				35	0	0	0	0	1	0

==== By year ====
(key)

Year	Class	Bike	1	2	3	4	5	6	7	8	9	10	11	12	13	14	15	16	17	Pos	Pts
2005	125cc	Yamaha	SPA	POR	CHN	FRA	ITA	CAT	NED	GBR	GER	CZE	JPN	MAL; 31	QAT	AUS	TUR	VAL		NC	0
2006	125cc	Yamaha	SPA	QAT	TUR	CHN	FRA	ITA	CAT	NED	GBR	GER	CZE	MAL; 26	AUS	JPN	POR	VAL		NC	0
2007	250cc	Yamaha	QAT	SPA	TUR	CHN	FRA	ITA	CAT	GBR	NED	GER	CZE	RSM	POR	JPN	AUS	MAL; Ret	VAL	NC	0
2008	250cc	Yamaha	QAT; 17	SPA; 16	POR; 19	CHN; 15	FRA; Ret	ITA; 17	CAT; 18	GBR; 19	NED; 19	GER; 19	CZE; 19	RSM; 16	INP; C	JPN; 18	AUS; 17	MAL; 18	VAL; 19	28th	1
2013	Moto2	Suter	QAT; 24	AME; 24	SPA; 25	FRA; 18	ITA; Ret	CAT; 22	NED; 26	GER; 26	INP; 28	CZE; 23	GBR; 25	RSM	ARA; 22	MAL; 22	AUS; 15	JPN; Ret	VAL; 27	28th	1

=== Supersport World Championship ===
==== By season ====
Season	Motorcycle	Team	Race	Win	Pod	Pole	FLap	Pts	Plcd	WCh
2009	Yamaha YZF-R6	YZF Yamaha	12	0	0	0	0	8	25th	0
Total			12	0	0	0	0	8		0

==== By year ====
Year	Make	1	2	3	4	5	6	7	8	9	10	11	12	13	14	Pos	Pts
2009	Yamaha	AUS; Ret	QAT; 20	SPA; 15	NED; Ret	ITA; 17	RSA; 14	USA; 11	SMR; Ret	GBR	CZE	GER; Ret	ITA; Ret	FRA; Ret	POR; 16	25th	8
