= Stevie Bonsey =

American motorcycle racer

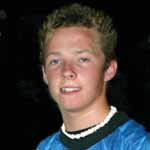
- Nationality: American
- Born: January 18, 1990 (age 36); Salinas, California, U.S.
Motorcycle racing career statistics
250cc World Championship
| Active years | 2009 |
| Manufacturers | Aprilia |
Starts / Wins / Podiums / Poles / F. laps / Points; 2 / 0 / 0 / 0 / 0 / 1
125cc World Championship
| Active years | 2007–2008 |
| Manufacturers | KTM, Aprilia |
Starts / Wins / Podiums / Poles / F. laps / Points; 34 / 0 / 0 / 0 / 0 / 50

Stevie Bonsey (born January 18, 1990) is an American motorcycle racer.

== Career statistics ==
=== Grand Prix motorcycle racing ===
==== By season ====
| Season | Class | Motorcycle | Team | Race | Win | Podium | Pole | FLap | Pts | Plcd |
|---|---|---|---|---|---|---|---|---|---|---|
| 2007 | 125cc | KTM | Red Bull KTM 125 | 17 | 0 | 0 | 0 | 0 | 4 | 25th |
| 2008 | 125cc | Aprilia | Degraaf Grand Prix | 17 | 0 | 0 | 0 | 0 | 46 | 15th |
| 2009 | 250cc | Aprilia | Milar – Juegos Lucky | 2 | 0 | 0 | 0 | 0 | 1 | 29th |
| Total | | | | **36** | **0** | **0** | **0** | **0** | **51** | |

=== Races by year ===
(key) (Races in bold indicate pole position, races in italics indicate fastest lap)

| Year | Class | Bike | 1 | 2 | 3 | 4 | 5 | 6 | 7 | 8 | 9 | 10 | 11 | 12 | 13 | 14 | 15 | 16 | 17 | Pos. | Pts |
|---|---|---|---|---|---|---|---|---|---|---|---|---|---|---|---|---|---|---|---|---|---|
| 2007 | 125cc | KTM | QAT; 22 | SPA; 13 | TUR; 25 | CHN; Ret | FRA; Ret | ITA; 20 | CAT; Ret | GBR; 23 | NED; 27 | GER; 18 | CZE; 16 | RSM; 26 | POR; Ret | JPN; Ret | AUS; 15 | MAL; 26 | VAL; 16 | 25th | 4 |
| 2008 | 125cc | Aprilia | QAT; Ret | SPA; 6 | POR; 4 | CHN; 14 | FRA; Ret | ITA; 11 | CAT; 7 | GBR; 17 | NED; 17 | GER; 17 | CZE; Ret | RSM; Ret | INP; 9 | JPN; 20 | AUS; Ret | MAL; Ret | VAL; Ret | 15th | 46 |
| 2009 | 250cc | Aprilia | QAT | JPN | SPA | FRA | ITA | CAT; 15 | NED; Ret | GER | GBR | CZE | INP | RSM | POR | AUS | MAL | VAL | | 29th | 1 |
