= 2007 Malaysian motorcycle Grand Prix =

17th try of the Worldwide of MotoGp in 2007

(Malaysia) 2007 Malaysian Grand Prix
Race details
- Race 17 of 18 races in the 2007 Grand Prix motorcycle racing season
- Date: 21 October 2007
- Official name: Polini Malaysian Motorcycle Grand Prix
- Location: Sepang International Circuit
- Course: Permanent racing facility; 5.543 km (3.444 mi)

MotoGP
Pole position
- Rider: (Spain) Dani Pedrosa
- Time: 2:01.877
Fastest lap
- Rider: (Australia) Casey Stoner
- Time: 2:02.108
Podium
- First: (Australia) Casey Stoner
- Second: (Italy) Marco Melandri
- Third: (Spain) Dani Pedrosa

250cc
Pole position
- Rider: (Japan) Hiroshi Aoyama
- Time: 2:07.429
Fastest lap
- Rider: (Japan) Hiroshi Aoyama
- Time: 2:08.266
Podium
- First: (Japan) Hiroshi Aoyama
- Second: (Spain) Héctor Barberá
- Third: (Spain) Jorge Lorenzo

125cc
Pole position
- Rider: (Spain) Héctor Faubel
- Time: 2:13.327
Fastest lap
- Rider: (Hungary) Gábor Talmácsi
- Time: 2:13.987
Podium
- First: (Hungary) Gábor Talmácsi
- Second: (Japan) Tomoyoshi Koyama
- Third: (Spain) Héctor Faubel

The 2007 Malaysian motorcycle Grand Prix was the seventeenth round of the 2007 MotoGP championship. It was held on 19–21 October at the Sepang International Circuit, Sepang, Selangor.

== MotoGP classification ==
Pos.	No.	Rider	Team	Manufacturer	Laps	Time/Retired	Grid	Points
1	27	(Australia) Casey Stoner	Ducati Marlboro Team	Ducati	21	43:04.405	2	25
2	33	(Italy) Marco Melandri	Honda Gresini	Honda	21	+1.701	3	20
3	26	(Spain) Dani Pedrosa	Repsol Honda Team	Honda	21	+2.326	1	16
4	14	(France) Randy de Puniet	Kawasaki Racing Team	Kawasaki	21	+3.765	4	13
5	46	(Italy) Valentino Rossi	Fiat Yamaha Team	Yamaha	21	+4.773	9	11
6	24	(Spain) Toni Elías	Honda Gresini	Honda	21	+17.667	8	10
7	71	(Australia) Chris Vermeulen	Rizla Suzuki MotoGP	Suzuki	21	+20.950	7	9
8	21	(United States) John Hopkins	Rizla Suzuki MotoGP	Suzuki	21	+22.198	10	8
9	1	(United States) Nicky Hayden	Repsol Honda Team	Honda	21	+22.450	6	7
10	5	(United States) Colin Edwards	Fiat Yamaha Team	Yamaha	21	+29.746	13	6
11	65	(Italy) Loris Capirossi	Ducati Marlboro Team	Ducati	21	+34.923	11	5
12	4	(Brazil) Alex Barros	Pramac d'Antin	Ducati	21	+35.667	12	4
13	9	(Japan) Nobuatsu Aoki	Rizla Suzuki MotoGP	Suzuki	21	+44.113	19	3
14	7	(Spain) Carlos Checa	Honda LCR	Honda	21	+44.486	16	2
15	13	(Australia) Anthony West	Kawasaki Racing Team	Kawasaki	21	+49.658	5	1
16	56	(Japan) Shinya Nakano	Konica Minolta Honda	Honda	21	+51.726	14	
17	57	(United Kingdom) Chaz Davies	Pramac d'Antin	Ducati	21	+58.905	17	
18	6	(Japan) Makoto Tamada	Dunlop Yamaha Tech 3	Yamaha	21	+59.596	18	
19	50	(France) Sylvain Guintoli	Dunlop Yamaha Tech 3	Yamaha	21	+1:23.119	15	
20	80	(United States) Kurtis Roberts	Team Roberts	KR212V	21	+1:50.960	20	

== 250 cc classification ==
Pos.	No.	Rider	Manufacturer	Laps	Time/Retired	Grid	Points
1	4	(Japan) Hiroshi Aoyama	KTM	20	43:09.316	1	25
2	80	(Spain) Héctor Barberá	Aprilia	20	+2.251	7	20
3	1	(Spain) Jorge Lorenzo	Aprilia	20	+2.957	3	16
4	36	(Finland) Mika Kallio	KTM	20	+2.965	2	13
5	12	(Switzerland) Thomas Lüthi	Aprilia	20	+7.305	6	11
6	60	(Spain) Julián Simón	Honda	20	+8.747	8	10
7	15	(Italy) Roberto Locatelli	Gilera	20	+16.105	10	9
8	58	(Italy) Marco Simoncelli	Gilera	20	+26.101	11	8
9	55	(Japan) Yuki Takahashi	Honda	20	+28.032	12	7
10	41	(Spain) Aleix Espargaró	Aprilia	20	+34.754	14	6
11	34	(Italy) Andrea Dovizioso	Honda	20	+35.888	4	5
12	17	(Czech Republic) Karel Abraham	Aprilia	20	+42.514	13	4
13	73	(Japan) Shuhei Aoyama	Honda	20	+48.020	16	3
14	25	(Italy) Alex Baldolini	Aprilia	20	+48.058	17	2
15	28	(Germany) Dirk Heidolf	Aprilia	20	+49.190	19	1
16	8	(Thailand) Ratthapark Wilairot	Honda	20	+49.273	15	
17	50	(Republic of Ireland) Eugene Laverty	Honda	20	+53.468	20	
18	11	(Japan) Taro Sekiguchi	Aprilia	20	+1:02.665	25	
19	16	(France) Jules Cluzel	Aprilia	20	+1:15.625	18	
20	32	(Italy) Fabrizio Lai	Aprilia	20	+1:17.024	21	
21	10	(Hungary) Imre Tóth	Aprilia	20	+1:32.646	24	
Ret	21	(Italy) Federico Sandi	Aprilia	17	Retirement	23	
Ret	35	(Indonesia) Doni Tata Pradita	Yamaha	16	Retirement	26	
Ret	3	(San Marino) Alex de Angelis	Aprilia	10	Accident	9	
Ret	7	(Spain) Efrén Vázquez	Aprilia	9	Retirement	22	
Ret	19	(Spain) Álvaro Bautista	Aprilia	6	Retirement	5	
OFFICIAL 250cc REPORT

== 125 cc classification ==
Pos.	No.	Rider	Manufacturer	Laps	Time/Retired	Grid	Points
1	14	(Hungary) Gábor Talmácsi	Aprilia	19	42:50.831	2	25
2	71	(Japan) Tomoyoshi Koyama	KTM	19	+6.753	6	20
3	55	(Spain) Héctor Faubel	Aprilia	19	+7.793	1	16
4	6	(Spain) Joan Olivé	Aprilia	19	+8.180	8	13
5	33	(Spain) Sergio Gadea	Aprilia	19	+8.947	11	11
6	52	(Czech Republic) Lukáš Pešek	Derbi	19	+9.935	7	10
7	24	(Italy) Simone Corsi	Aprilia	19	+10.132	5	9
8	75	(Italy) Mattia Pasini	Aprilia	19	+10.335	10	8
9	38	(United Kingdom) Bradley Smith	Honda	19	+23.426	15	7
10	7	(France) Alexis Masbou	Honda	19	+24.808	12	6
11	18	(Spain) Nicolás Terol	Derbi	19	+24.909	13	5
12	22	(Spain) Pablo Nieto	Aprilia	19	+26.194	9	4
13	17	(Germany) Stefan Bradl	Aprilia	19	+29.490	19	3
14	63	(France) Mike Di Meglio	Honda	19	+29.775	18	2
15	12	(Spain) Esteve Rabat	Honda	19	+31.011	17	1
16	27	(Italy) Stefano Bianco	Aprilia	19	+35.455	24	
17	34	(Switzerland) Randy Krummenacher	KTM	19	+35.829	23	
18	29	(Italy) Andrea Iannone	Aprilia	19	+54.666	21	
19	8	(Italy) Lorenzo Zanetti	Aprilia	19	+56.956	26	
20	53	(Italy) Simone Grotzkyj	Aprilia	19	+57.356	30	
21	20	(Italy) Roberto Tamburini	Aprilia	19	+1:05.426	20	
22	99	(United Kingdom) Danny Webb	Honda	19	+1:08.541	25	
23	95	(Romania) Robert Mureșan	Derbi	19	+1:08.549	31	
24	37	(Netherlands) Joey Litjens	Honda	19	+1:19.477	27	
25	36	(France) Cyril Carrillo	Honda	19	+1:22.382	29	
26	51	(United States) Stevie Bonsey	KTM	19	+1:30.374	28	
27	79	(Italy) Ferruccio Lamborghini	Aprilia	19	+1:33.736	33	
28	35	(Italy) Raffaele De Rosa	Aprilia	19	+1:41.013	14	
NC	13	(Italy) Dino Lombardi	Honda	19	+2:16.481	32	
Ret	11	(Germany) Sandro Cortese	Aprilia	18	Retirement	3	
Ret	44	(Spain) Pol Espargaró	Aprilia	15	Accident	4	
Ret	77	(Switzerland) Dominique Aegerter	Aprilia	5	Retirement	22	
Ret	60	(Austria) Michael Ranseder	Derbi	0	Accident	16	
OFFICIAL 125cc REPORT

== Championship standings after the race (MotoGP) ==
Below are the standings for the top five riders and constructors after round seventeen has concluded.

Riders' Championship standings

Pos.	Rider	Points
1	(Australia) Casey Stoner	347
2	(Italy) Valentino Rossi	241
3	(Spain) Dani Pedrosa	217
4	(Italy) Marco Melandri	174
5	(United States) John Hopkins	173

Constructors' Championship standings

Pos.	Constructor	Points
1	(Italy) Ducati	374
2	(Japan) Honda	288
3	(Japan) Yamaha	278
4	(Japan) Suzuki	225
5	(Japan) Kawasaki	137

- Note: Only the top five positions are included for both sets of standings.

Previous race: 2007 Australian Grand Prix	FIM Grand Prix World Championship; 2007 season	Next race: 2007 Valencian Grand Prix
Previous race: 2006 Malaysian Grand Prix	Malaysian motorcycle Grand Prix	Next race: 2008 Malaysian Grand Prix
