= Kévin Szalaï =

French motorcycle racer

Kevin Szalai
- Nationality: French
- Born: July 20, 1992 (age 34); Forbach, France
- Current team: Adequation Bike Yamaha
- Bike number: 90
- Website: kevinszalai.com

Kevin Szalai is a Grand Prix motorcycle racer from France.

== Career statistics ==
2011 - 39th, European Superstock 600 Championship, Yamaha YZF-R6
2012 - NC, European Superstock 600 Championship, Yamaha YZF-R6

=== By season ===
Season	Class	Motorcycle	Team	Number	Race	Win	Podium	Pole	FLap	Pts	Plcd
2010	125cc	Honda	Equipe de France Vitesse Espoir	82	1	0	0	0	0	0	NC
2011	125cc	Aprilia	Maxiscoot MVT Racing	91	1	0	0	0	0	0	NC
Total					**2**	**0**	**0**	**0**	**0**	**0**	

=== Races by year ===
(key)

Yr	Class	Bike	1	2	3	4	5	6	7	8	9	10	11	12	13	14	15	16	17	Pos	Pts
2010	125cc	Honda	QAT	SPA	FRA; 23	ITA	GBR	NED	CAT	GER	CZE	INP	RSM	ARA	JPN	MAL	AUS	POR	VAL	NC	0
2011	125cc	Aprilia	QAT	SPA	POR	FRA; 27	CAT	GBR	NED	ITA	GER	CZE	INP	RSM	ARA	JPN	AUS	MAL	VAL	NC	0

=== European Superstock 600 ===
==== Races by year ====
(key) (Races in bold indicate pole position, races in italics indicate fastest lap)

Year	Bike	1	2	3	4	5	6	7	8	9	10	Pos	Pts
2011	Yamaha	ASS	MNZ	MIS	ARA	BRN	SIL	NÜR	IMO	MAG; 15	POR	39th	1
2012	Yamaha	IMO	ASS	MNZ	MIS	ARA	BRN	SIL	NÜR	POR	MAG; 25	NC	0
