= Dino Lombardi =

Italian motorcycle racer

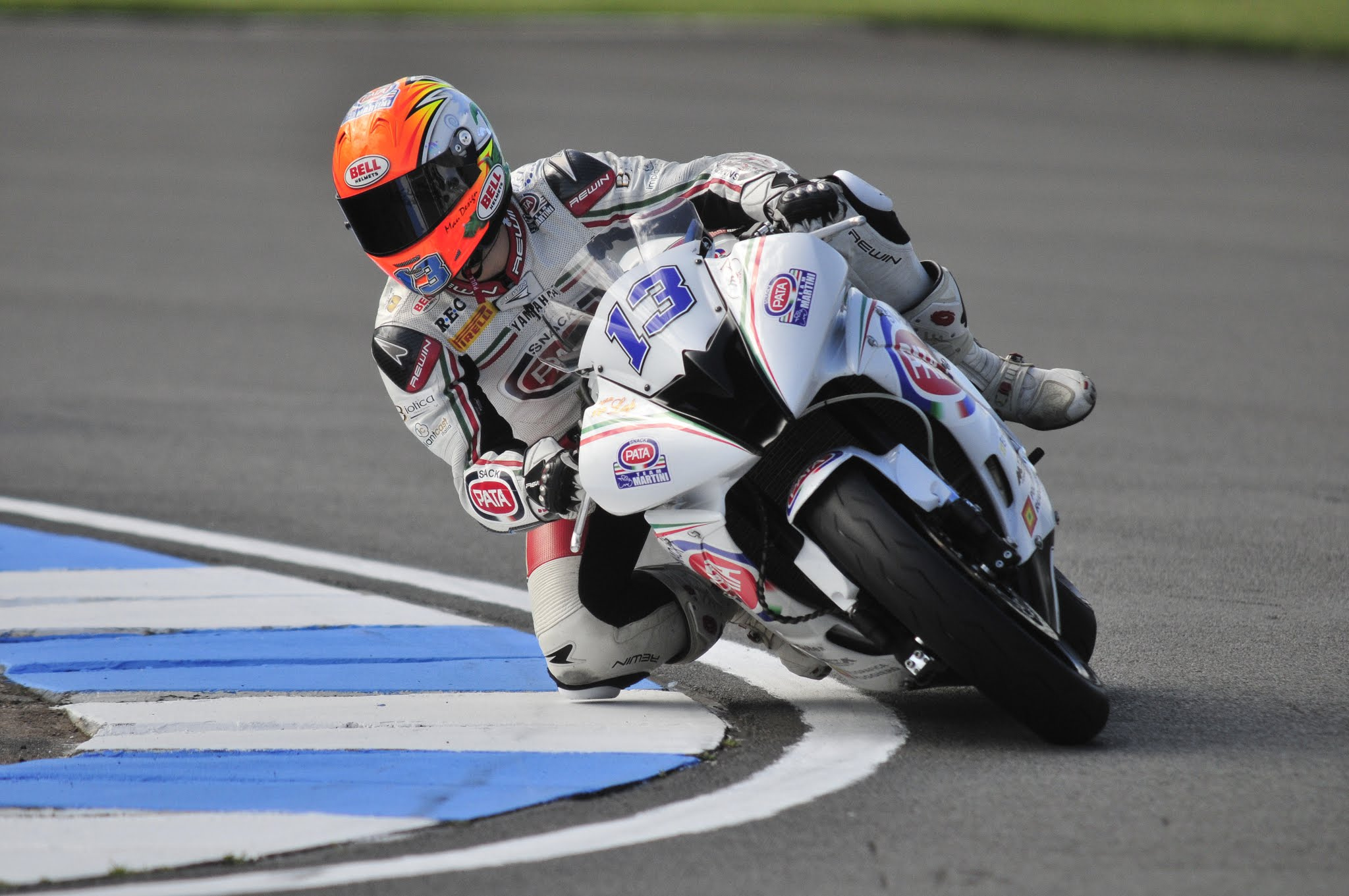
- Lombardi in 2012
- Nationality: Italian
- Born: 10 May 1990 (age 36); Benevento, Italy
Motorcycle racing career statistics
125cc World Championship
Active years	2006–2008
Manufacturers	Aprilia, Honda
Starts / Wins / Podiums / Poles / F. laps / Points; 28 / 0 / 0 / 0 / 0 / 0
Supersport World Championship
Active years	2012–2013
Manufacturers	Yamaha, Honda
Starts / Wins / Podiums / Poles / F. laps / Points; 15 / 0 / 0 / 0 / 0 / 2

Berardino Lombardi (born 10 May 1990) is an Italian motorcycle racer who has competed in the 125cc World Championship, the Supersport World Championship and the European Superstock 600 Championship. He won the CIV Stock 600 Championship in 2011.

== Career statistics ==
2009 - 15th, European Superstock 600 Championship, Yamaha YZF-R6 Kawasaki ZX-6R
2010 - 3rd, European Superstock 600 Championship, Yamaha YZF-R6
2011 - 5th, European Superstock 600 Championship, Yamaha YZF-R6

=== Grand Prix motorcycle racing ===
==== By season ====
Season	Class	Motorcycle	Team	Race	Win	Podium	Pole	FLap	Pts	Plcd
2006	125cc	Aprilia	3C Racing	14	0	0	0	0	0	NC
2007	125cc	Honda	Kopron Team Scot	12	0	0	0	0	0	NC
2008	125cc	Aprilia	BQR Blusens	2	0	0	0	0	0	NC
Total				**28**	**0**	**0**	**0**	**0**	**0**	

==== Races by year ====
(key)

Year	Class	Bike	1	2	3	4	5	6	7	8	9	10	11	12	13	14	15	16	17	Pos.	Pts
2006	125cc	Aprilia	SPA	QAT	TUR; 33	CHN; 31	FRA; 30	ITA; 27	CAT; 26	NED; 30	GBR; NC	GER; Ret	CZE; 28	MAL; Ret	AUS; 24	JPN; 26	POR; 22	VAL; 31		NC	0
2007	125cc	Honda	QAT	SPA; 23	TUR; Ret	CHN; 24	FRA; 21	ITA; Ret	CAT; DNS	GBR	NED	GER; DNS	CZE; 26	RSM; Ret	POR; Ret	JPN; Ret	AUS; 24	MAL; NC	VAL; 25	NC	0
2008	125cc	Aprilia	QAT; Ret	SPA	POR; 23	CHN	FRA	ITA	CAT	GBR	NED	GER	CZE	RSM	INP	JPN	AUS	MAL	VAL	NC	0

=== European Superstock 600 ===
==== Races by year ====
(key) (Races in bold indicate pole position, races in italics indicate fastest lap)

Year	Bike	1	2	3	4	5	6	7	8	9	10	Pos	Pts
2009	Kawasaki/Yamaha	VAL; 10	ASS; 6	MNZ; 11	MIS; 14	SIL	BRN; DNS	NÜR	IMO	MAG	POR	15th	23
2010	Yamaha	POR; 7	VAL; 4	ASS; 3	MNZ; Ret	MIS; 11	BRN; 3	SIL; 5	NÜR; 4	IMO; 10	MAG; 2	3rd	109
2011	Yamaha	ASS; 4	MNZ; 2	MIS; Ret	ARA; 4	BRN; 1	SIL; 13	NÜR; 13	IMO; 7	MAG; Ret	POR; 6	5th	94

=== Supersport World Championship ===
==== Races by year ====
(key)

Year	Bike	1	2	3	4	5	6	7	8	9	10	11	12	13	Pos.	Pts
2012	Yamaha	AUS; 20	ITA; Ret	NED; Ret	ITA; 22	EUR; 23	SMR; 14	SPA; 17	CZE; 18	GBR; 20	RUS; 23				37th	2
2012	Honda											GER; 18	POR; Ret	FRA; DNS	37th	2
2013	Yamaha	AUS; Ret	SPA	NED; 24	ITA; 21	GBR	POR	ITA	RUS	GBR	GER	TUR	FRA	SPA	NC	0
