= 2011 European Superstock 600 Championship =

Motorcycle racing series

2011 European Superstock 600 Championship
| Previous: | 2010 | Next: | 2012 |
Support series: Superbike World Championship; Supersport World Championship; FIM Superstock 1000 Cup; European Junior Cup

The 2011 European Superstock 600 Championship was the seventh season of the European Superstock 600 Championship. The season was contested over tenth races, beginning at TT Circuit Assen on 17 April and ending at Algarve International Circuit on 16 October. Jed Metcher won the title after beating Joshua Day.

== Race calendar and results ==
2011 Calendar
| Round | Country | Circuit | Date | Pole position | Fastest lap | Winning rider | Winning team |
|---|---|---|---|---|---|---|---|
| 1 | Netherlands | TT Circuit Assen | 17 April | (Australia) Jed Metcher | (Australia) Jed Metcher | (Netherlands) Michael Van Der Mark | Ten Kate Junior Team |
| 2 | Italy | Autodromo Nazionale Monza | 8 May | (France) Romain Lanusse | (Spain) Nacho Calero | (France) Romain Lanusse | MRS Yamaha Racing France |
| 3 | San Marino | Misano World Circuit Marco Simoncelli | 12 June | (Italy) Giuliano Gregorini | (Italy) Nicola Jr. Morrentino | (Italy) Giuliano Gregorini | RCGM Team |
| 4 | Spain | Motorland Aragón | 19 June | (Australia) Jed Metcher | (Australia) Jed Metcher | (Australia) Jed Metcher | MTM.RT Motorsports Team |
| 5 | Czech Republic | Brno Circuit | 10 July | (Italy) Dino Lombardi | (United States) Joshua Day | (Italy) Dino Lombardi | Martini Corse |
| 6 | United Kingdom | Silverstone Circuit | 31 July | (Netherlands) Michael Van Der Mark | (France) Romain Lanusse | (United States) Joshua Day | Revolution Racedays Kawasaki |
| 7 | Germany | Nürburgring | 4 September | (United States) Joshua Day | (Netherlands) Michael Van Der Mark | (Netherlands) Michael Van Der Mark | Ten Kate Junior Team |
| 8 | Italy | Autodromo Enzo e Dino Ferrari | 25 September | (Australia) Jed Metcher | (Netherlands) Michael Van Der Mark | (United States) Joshua Day | Revolution Racedays Kawasaki |
| 9 | France | Circuit de Nevers Magny-Cours | 2 October | (United States) Joshua Day | (United States) Joshua Day | (Netherlands) Michael Van Der Mark | Ten Kate Junior Team |
| 10 | Portugal | Algarve International Circuit | 16 October | (France) Romain Lanusse | (France) Romain Lanusse | (Netherlands) Michael Van Der Mark | Ten Kate Junior Team |

== Entry list ==
| Team | Constructor | Motorcycle | No. | Rider | Rounds |
|---|---|---|---|---|---|
| Bogdanka PTR Honda | Honda | Honda CBR600RR | 16 | (Poland) Artur Wielebski | 8 |
| Davies Auto Racedays | Honda | Honda CBR600RR | 44 | (Australia) Matt Davies | 10 |
| Domburg Racing | Honda | Honda CBR600RR | 78 | (Netherlands) Tristan Lentink | All |
| Elle2Ciatti | Honda | Honda CBR600RR | 825 | (United States) Joey Pascarella | 8 |
| G.A.S. Racing Team | Honda | Honda CBR600RR | 151 | (Italy) Filippo Benini | 8 |
| Schacht Racing SBK One | Honda | Honda CBR600RR | 59 | (Denmark) Alex Schacht | All |
| Team B.S.R. | Honda | Honda CBR600RR | 28 | (Switzerland) Bryan Leu | 9 |
| Team B.S.R. | Honda | Honda CBR600RR | 39 | (Switzerland) Sébastien Suchet | 9 |
| Ten Kate Junior Team | Honda | Honda CBR600RR | 60 | (Netherlands) Michael Van Der Mark | All |
| CN Racing | Kawasaki | Kawasaki ZX-6R | 2 | (United Kingdom) Glenn Irwin | 10 |
| Davies Auto Racedays | Kawasaki | Kawasaki ZX-6R | 44 | (Australia) Matt Davies | 5 |
| GoEleven | Kawasaki | Kawasaki ZX-6R | 18 | (Italy) Christian Gamarino | All |
| Kawasaki Motocard.com | Kawasaki | Kawasaki ZX-6R | 20 | (Australia) Matthew Walters | 10 |
| Revolution Racedays Kawasaki | Kawasaki | Kawasaki ZX-6R | 4 | (United States) Joshua Day | All |
| Revolution Racedays Kawasaki | Kawasaki | Kawasaki ZX-6R | 27 | (Germany) Marvin Fritz | 9 |
| Coutelle Junior Team | Triumph | Triumph Daytona 675 | 7 | (France) Clément Chevrier | 4 |
| FRT | Triumph | Triumph Daytona 675 | 64 | (Italy) Riccardo Cecchini | 1–5, 7–10 |
| Martinez Racing Team | Triumph | Triumph Daytona 675 | 14 | (France) Jonathan Martinez | 9 |
| Aye Gee Suzuki | Suzuki | Suzuki GSX-R600 | 5 | (United Kingdom) Josh Wainwright | 6 |
| Pio Motorsport | Suzuki | Suzuki GSX-R600 | 21 | (Spain) Esteve Bague | 10 |
| Active'Bike Tournay District R.T. | Yamaha | Yamaha YZF-R6 | 6 | (France) Richard De Tournay | 9–10 |
| A.S. Team Riviera | Yamaha | Yamaha YZF-R6 | 415 | (Italy) Federico Dittadi | 2–3, 8 |
| Bike Center | Yamaha | Yamaha YZF-R6 | 25 | (Italy) Federico Monti | 8–9 |
| Bike Service R.T. | Yamaha | Yamaha YZF-R6 | 17 | (Italy) Luca Salvadori | 1–4 |
| Bike Service R.T. | Yamaha | Yamaha YZF-R6 | 25 | (Italy) Federico Monti | 10 |
| Bike Service R.T. | Yamaha | Yamaha YZF-R6 | 94 | (Italy) Manuel D'Andrea | 8 |
| Bogdanka Junior | Yamaha | Yamaha YZF-R6 | 16 | (Poland) Artur Wielebski | 5 |
| Colin Appleyard/Macadam R. | Yamaha | Yamaha YZF-R6 | 54 | (United Kingdom) Deane Brown | 10 |
| C.S.M. Bucharest | Yamaha | Yamaha YZF-R6 | 26 | (Romania) Mircea Vrajitoru | 1–5, 7–9 |
| E.G.T. - Team | Yamaha | Yamaha YZF-R6 | 22 | (Spain) Aleix Aulestia | 10 |
| Elle2Ciatti | Yamaha | Yamaha YZF-R6 | 37 | (Italy) Stefano Mesa | 8 |
| Elle2Ciatti | Yamaha | Yamaha YZF-R6 | 53 | (Italy) Nicola Jr. Morrentino | 3, 8 |
| Elle2Ciatti | Yamaha | Yamaha YZF-R6 | 90 | (Italy) Rosario Paratore | 8 |
| Elle2Ciatti | Yamaha | Yamaha YZF-R6 | 825 | (United States) Joey Pascarella | 3 |
| Gentlemen Riders | Yamaha | Yamaha YZF-R6 | 76 | (France) Clive Rambure | 9 |
| Forwards S.A. Forwards Racing Jr. Team | Yamaha | Yamaha YZF-R6 | 12 | (Italy) Franco Morbidelli | 2–3, 8, 10 |
| Forwards S.A. Forwards Racing Jr. Team | Yamaha | Yamaha YZF-R6 | 70 | (Italy) Luca Vitali | 2–3, 8, 10 |
| FP Evolution | Yamaha | Yamaha YZF-R6 | 96 | (Italy) Gennaro Romano | 3 |
| M2R Racing | Yamaha | Yamaha YZF-R6 | 72 | (Italy) Marco Ravaioli | 3 |
| Martini Corse | Yamaha | Yamaha YZF-R6 | 13 | (Italy) Dino Lombardi | All |
| Martini Corse | Yamaha | Yamaha YZF-R6 | 75 | (Italy) Francesco Cocco | All |
| MOUSS Racing Team | Yamaha | Yamaha YZF-R6 | 88 | (France) Mathieu Marchal | 10 |
| MRS Yamaha Racing France | Yamaha | Yamaha YZF-R6 | 23 | (Luxembourg) Christophe Ponsson | All |
| MRS Yamaha Racing France | Yamaha | Yamaha YZF-R6 | 97 | (France) Gregory Di Carlo | 9–10 |
| MRS Yamaha Racing France | Yamaha | Yamaha YZF-R6 | 98 | (France) Romain Lanusse | All |
| MTM-RT Motorsports Team | Yamaha | Yamaha YZF-R6 | 3 | (Australia) Jed Metcher | All |
| MTM-RT Motorsports Team | Yamaha | Yamaha YZF-R6 | 52 | (Belgium) Gauthier Duwelz | All |
| MTM-RT Motorsports Team | Yamaha | Yamaha YZF-R6 | 92 | (Australia) Adrian Nestorovic | All |
| MZB Motorrad Bonn | Yamaha | Yamaha YZF-R6 | 47 | (Germany) Marc Buchner | 7 |
| Nito Racing | Yamaha | Yamaha YZF-R6 | 99 | (Netherlands) Tony Coveña | All |
| Orelac Racing | Yamaha | Yamaha YZF-R6 | 10 | (Spain) Nacho Calero | All |
| RCGM Team | Yamaha | Yamaha YZF-R6 | 9 | (Croatia) Tedy Bašić | 7 |
| RCGM Team | Yamaha | Yamaha YZF-R6 | 33 | (Italy) Giuliano Gregorini | 2–3, 7–8 |
| Rosso e Nero | Yamaha | Yamaha YZF-R6 | 77 | (Italy) Stefano Casalotti | 2–3 |
| RRT Racing | Yamaha | Yamaha YZF-R6 | 74 | (Switzerland) Robin Mulhauser | 8–10 |
| Team ASPI | Yamaha | Yamaha YZF-R6 | 6 | (France) Richard De Tournay | 5 |
| Team ASPI | Yamaha | Yamaha YZF-R6 | 11 | (France) Anthony Dumont | 8 |
| Team ASPI | Yamaha | Yamaha YZF-R6 | 43 | (France) Stéphane Egea | All |
| Team ASPI | Yamaha | Yamaha YZF-R6 | 49 | (France) Maxime Cudeville | 9 |
| Team ASPI | Yamaha | Yamaha YZF-R6 | 71 | (United Kingdom) Max Wadsworth | 1–4, 6 |
| Team Falcone Competition | Yamaha | Yamaha YZF-R6 | 69 | (France) Nelson Major | 1–6 |
| Team Falcone Competition | Yamaha | Yamaha YZF-R6 | 88 | (France) Mathieu Marchal | 9 |
| Team POLand Position | Yamaha | Yamaha YZF-R6 | 100 | (Poland) Adrian Pasek | 10 |
| Team Pro Boost | Yamaha | Yamaha YZF-R6 | 15 | (France) Kevin Szalai | 9 |
| Team Trasimeno | Yamaha | Yamaha YZF-R6 | 29 | (Italy) Daniele Beretta | 5–6 |
| Team Trasimeno | Yamaha | Yamaha YZF-R6 | 29 | (Italy) Daniele Beretta | 7–10 |
| Team Trasimeno | Yamaha | Yamaha YZF-R6 | 31 | (South Africa) Jonathan Willcox | 10 |
| Team Trasimeno | Yamaha | Yamaha YZF-R6 | 56 | (United States) Austin Dehaven | 1–6 |
| Team Trasimeno | Yamaha | Yamaha YZF-R6 | 84 | (Italy) Riccardo Russo | All |
| Team Trasimeno | Yamaha | Yamaha YZF-R6 | 117 | (Colombia) Juan Velasco | 10 |
| TK Racing Slovakia | Yamaha | Yamaha YZF-R6 | 19 | (Slovakia) Tomáš Krajči | All |
| WMT Yamaha | Yamaha | Yamaha YZF-R6 | 8 | (United Kingdom) Joshua Elliott | 1–7, 9–10 |

Key
Regular rider
Wildcard rider
Replacement rider

- All entries used Pirelli tyres.

== Championship' standings ==
=== Riders' standings ===
| Pos | Rider | Bike | ASS (Netherlands) | MNZ (Italy) | MIS (San Marino) | ARA (Spain) | BRN (Czech Republic) | SIL (United Kingdom) | NÜR (Germany) | IMO (Italy) | MAG (France) | POR (Portugal) | Pts |
|---|---|---|---|---|---|---|---|---|---|---|---|---|---|
| 1 | (Australia) Jed Metcher | Yamaha | **3** | 21 | 2 | **1** | Ret | 2 | 2 | **3** | 2 | 4 | 150 |
| 2 | (United States) Joshua Day | Kawasaki | 9 | 3 | 20 | 8 | 2 | 1 | **15** | 1 | **3** | 2 | 138 |
| 3 | (Netherlands) Michael Van Der Mark | Honda | 1 | 10 | Ret | 6 | 6 | **Ret** | 1 | 5 | 1 | 1 | 137 |
| 4 | (France) Romain Lanusse | Yamaha | 2 | **1** | 3 | 2 | Ret | 4 | Ret | 9 | 20 | **Ret** | 101 |
| 5 | (Italy) Dino Lombardi | Yamaha | 4 | 2 | Ret | 4 | **1** | 13 | 13 | 7 | Ret | 6 | 96 |
| 6 | (Italy) Riccardo Russo | Yamaha | 7 | 5 | Ret | 7 | 7 | 3 | 7 | 2 | Ret | 5 | 94 |
| 7 | (Belgium) Gauthier Duwelz | Yamaha | 8 | 13 | 5 | 3 | 4 | Ret | 3 | Ret | 18 | Ret | 67 |
| 8 | (Netherlands) Tony Coveña | Yamaha | 18 | 12 | Ret | 10 | 10 | 8 | 6 | 13 | 4 | 25 | 50 |
| 9 | (France) Stéphane Egea | Yamaha | DNS | 15 | Ret | 5 | 5 | 6 | 10 | Ret | Ret | 11 | 44 |
| 10 | (Italy) Francesco Cocco | Yamaha | 5 | Ret | Ret | 11 | 9 | 12 | 12 | 18 | 8 | Ret | 39 |
| 11 | (Italy) Daniele Beretta | Yamaha | | | | | | 5 | 5 | 10 | 6 | Ret | 38 |
| 12 | (Slovakia) Tomáš Krajči | Yamaha | 15 | 16 | 18 | 16 | 3 | Ret | 16 | 12 | Ret | 3 | 37 |
| 13 | (Italy) Giuliano Gregorini | Yamaha | | 6 | **1** | | | | Ret | Ret | | | 35 |
| 14 | (Denmark) Alex Schacht | Honda | 10 | Ret | Ret | 15 | 12 | 7 | 4 | 16 | 23 | 14 | 35 |
| 15 | (Spain) Nacho Calero | Yamaha | 6 | 9 | 14 | Ret | 8 | 10 | Ret | 19 | 14 | Ret | 35 |
| 16 | (Australia) Adrian Nestorovic | Yamaha | 16 | 18 | 10 | 9 | 11 | 15 | 9 | 23 | 11 | 13 | 34 |
| 17 | (Italy) Franco Morbidelli | Yamaha | | 4 | Ret | | | | | 6 | | 7 | 32 |
| 18 | (United Kingdom) Joshua Elliott | Yamaha | 11 | 14 | 11 | 13 | 14 | 9 | 8 | | 16 | Ret | 32 |
| 19 | (Italy) Nicola Jr. Morrentino | Yamaha | | | 4 | | | | | 4 | | | 26 |
| 20 | (Italy) Riccardo Cecchini | Triumph | 20 | 19 | 6 | WD | 13 | | Ret | Ret | Ret | 9 | 20 |
| 21 | (Romania) Mircea Vrajitoru | Yamaha | 19 | 17 | 7 | 18 | 16 | | 11 | Ret | 10 | | 20 |
| 22 | (Italy) Luca Vitali | Yamaha | | 7 | Ret | | | | | 22 | | 8 | 17 |
| 23 | (France) Nelson Major | Yamaha | Ret | 8 | 13 | 19 | Ret | 11 | | | | | 16 |
| 24 | (Italy) Federico Dittadi | Yamaha | | 11 | Ret | | | | | 8 | | | 13 |
| 25 | (Italy) Christian Gamarino | Kawasaki | Ret | Ret | 9 | 14 | Ret | Ret | 14 | 15 | 25 | Ret | 12 |
| 26 | (Switzerland) Robin Mulhauser | Yamaha | | | | | | | | 17 | 5 | DNS | 11 |
| 27 | (France) Mathieu Marchal | Yamaha | | | | | | | | | 7 | 15 | 10 |
| 28 | (United States) Joey Pascarella | Yamaha | | | 8 | | | | | | | | 10 |
| 28 | (United States) Joey Pascarella | Honda | | | | | | | | 14 | | | 10 |
| 29 | (Luxembourg) Christophe Ponsson | Yamaha | 13 | 23 | 15 | 20 | 21 | 17 | 17 | 24 | 22 | 10 | 10 |
| 30 | (Italy) Federico Monti | Yamaha | | | | | | | | 11 | 13 | 17 | 8 |
| 31 | (France) Gregory Di Carlo | Yamaha | | | | | | | | | 9 | Ret | 7 |
| 32 | (France) Richard De Tournay | Yamaha | | | | | 15 | | | | Ret | 12 | 5 |
| 33 | (United States) Austin Dehaven | Yamaha | 12 | 22 | Ret | Ret | 18 | 16 | | | | | 4 |
| 34 | (Italy) Gennaro Romano | Yamaha | | | 12 | | | | | | | | 4 |
| 35 | (France) Clement Chevrier | Yamaha | | | | 12 | | | | | | | 4 |
| 36 | (Switzerland) Sebastien Suchet | Honda | | | | | | | | | 12 | | 4 |
| 37 | (Netherlands) Tristan Lentink | Honda | 14 | 24 | 19 | 21 | 20 | Ret | Ret | 29 | 21 | 22 | 2 |
| 38 | (United Kingdom) Josh Wainwright | Suzuki | | | | | | 14 | | | | | 2 |
| 39 | (France) Kevin Szalai | Yamaha | | | | | | | | | 15 | | 1 |
| | (Italy) Stefano Casalotti | Yamaha | | Ret | 16 | | | | | | | | 0 |
| | (United Kingdom) Deane Brown | Yamaha | | | | | | | | | | 16 | 0 |
| | (Italy) Luca Salvadori | Yamaha | 17 | Ret | Ret | 17 | | | | | | | 0 |
| | (Poland) Artur Wielebski | Yamaha | | | | | 17 | | | | | | 0 |
| | (Poland) Artur Wielebski | Honda | | | | | | | | 21 | | | 0 |
| | (France) Maxime Cudeville | Yamaha | | | | | | | | | 17 | | 0 |
| | (Italy) Marco Ravaioli | Yamaha | | | 17 | | | | | | | | |
| | (Germany) Marc Buchner | Yamaha | | | | | | | 18 | | | | 0 |
| | (Spain) Aleix Aulestia | Yamaha | | | | | | | | | | 18 | 0 |
| | (Australia) Matt Davies | Kawasaki | | | | | 19 | | | | | | 0 |
| | (Australia) Matt Davies | Honda | | | | | | | | | | Ret | 0 |
| | (France) Jonathan Martinez | Triumph | | | | | | | | | 19 | | 0 |
| | (South Africa) Jonathan Willcox | Yamaha | | | | | | | | | | 19 | 0 |
| | (United Kingdom) Max Wadsworth | Yamaha | DNS | 20 | Ret | DNS | | Ret | | | | | 0 |
| | (Italy) Stefano Mesa | Yamaha | | | | | | | | 20 | | | 0 |
| | (Colombia) Juan Velasco | Yamaha | | | | | | | | | | 20 | 0 |
| | (United Kingdom) Glenn Irwin | Kawasaki | | | | | | | | | | 21 | 0 |
| | (Australia) Matthew Walters | Kawasaki | | | | | | | | | | 23 | 0 |
| | (France) Clive Rambure | Yamaha | | | | | | | | | 24 | | 0 |
| | (Spain) Esteve Bague | Suzuki | | | | | | | | | | 24 | 0 |
| | (Italy) Manuel D'Andrea | Yamaha | | | | | | | | 25 | | | 0 |
| | (Italy) Filippo Benini | Honda | | | | | | | | 26 | | | 0 |
| | (Germany) Marvin Fritz | Kawasaki | | | | | | | | | 26 | | 0 |
| | (France) Anthony Dumont | Yamaha | | | | | | | | 27 | | | 0 |
| | (Italy) Rosario Paratore | Yamaha | | | | | | | | 28 | | | 0 |
| | (Croatia) Tedy Bašić | Yamaha | | | | | | | Ret | | | | 0 |
| | (Switzerland) Bryan Leu | Honda | | | | | | | | | Ret | | 0 |
| | (Poland) Adrian Pasek | Yamaha | | | | | | | | | | Ret | 0 |
| Pos | Rider | Bike | ASS (Netherlands) | MNZ (Italy) | MIS (San Marino) | ARA (Spain) | BRN (Czech Republic) | SIL (United Kingdom) | NÜR (Germany) | IMO (Italy) | MAG (France) | POR (Portugal) | Pts |

| Colour | Result |
|---|---|
| Gold | Winner |
| Silver | Second place |
| Bronze | Third place |
| Green | Points classification |
| Blue | Non-points classification |
| Blue | Non-classified finish (NC) |
| Purple | Retired, not classified (Ret) |
| Red | Did not qualify (DNQ) |
| Red | Did not pre-qualify (DNPQ) |
| Black | Disqualified (DSQ) |
| White | Did not start (DNS) |
| White | Withdrew (WD) |
| White | Race cancelled (C) |
| Blank | Did not practice (DNP) |
| Blank | Did not arrive (DNA) |
| Blank | Excluded (EX) |

**Bold** – Pole position
Italics – Fastest lap
Source :

=== Constructors' standings ===
| Pos | Constructor | ASS (Netherlands) | MNZ (Italy) | MIS (San Marino) | ARA (Spain) | BRN (Czech Republic) | SIL (United Kingdom) | NÜR (Germany) | IMO (Italy) | MAG (France) | POR (Portugal) | Pts |
|---|---|---|---|---|---|---|---|---|---|---|---|---|
| 1 | (Japan) Yamaha | 2 | 1 | 1 | 1 | 1 | 2 | 2 | 2 | 2 | 3 | 216 |
| 2 | (Japan) Honda | 1 | 10 | 19 | 6 | 6 | 7 | 1 | 5 | 1 | 1 | 146 |
| 3 | (Japan) Kawasaki | 9 | 3 | 9 | 8 | 2 | 1 | 14 | 1 | 3 | 2 | 146 |
| 4 | (United Kingdom) Triumph | 20 | 19 | 6 | 12 | 13 | | Ret | Ret | 19 | 9 | 24 |
| 5 | (Japan) Suzuki | | | | | | 14 | | | | 24 | 2 |
| Pos | Constructor | ASS (Netherlands) | MNZ (Italy) | MIS (San Marino) | ARA (Spain) | BRN (Czech Republic) | SIL (United Kingdom) | NÜR (Germany) | IMO (Italy) | MAG (France) | POR (Portugal) | Pts |
