= 2006 German motorcycle Grand Prix =

Tenth round of the 2006 MotoGP Championship

(Germany) 2006 German Grand Prix
Race details
- Race 10 of 17 races in the 2006 Grand Prix motorcycle racing season
- Date: 16 July 2006
- Official name: betandwin.com Motorrad Grand Prix Deutschland
- Location: Sachsenring
- Course: Permanent racing facility; 3.671 km (2.281 mi)

MotoGP
Pole position
- Rider: (Spain) Dani Pedrosa
- Time: 1:21.815
Fastest lap
- Rider: (Spain) Dani Pedrosa
- Time: 1:23.355
Podium
- First: (Italy) Valentino Rossi
- Second: (Italy) Marco Melandri
- Third: (United States) Nicky Hayden

250cc
Pole position
- Rider: (Spain) Jorge Lorenzo
- Time: 1:25.073
Fastest lap
- Rider: (San Marino) Alex de Angelis
- Time: 1:25.284
Podium
- First: (Japan) Yuki Takahashi
- Second: (San Marino) Alex de Angelis
- Third: (Spain) Jorge Lorenzo

125cc
Pole position
- Rider: (Czech Republic) Lukáš Pešek
- Time: 1:27.064
Fastest lap
- Rider: (Spain) Álvaro Bautista
- Time: 1:27.519
Podium
- First: (Italy) Mattia Pasini
- Second: (Spain) Álvaro Bautista
- Third: (Czech Republic) Lukáš Pešek

The 2006 German motorcycle Grand Prix was the tenth round of the 2006 MotoGP Championship. It took place on the weekend of 14–16 July 2006 at the Sachsenring.

== MotoGP race report ==
This race was most notable for the four-way battle for the win that happened throughout the race, as well as Rossi's victory from tenth on the grid.

After nine rounds, Nicky Hayden still leads the championship with 153 points. A rather distant second is rookie Dani Pedrosa with 127 and in third Valentino Rossi with 118, who has climbed up the order in a rather quick pace after early season mechanical problems and rider errors cost him quite some points.

On Saturday, Dani Pedrosa took pole position - his fourth and final of the season - with a time of 1:21.815. Lining alongside him in second is Kenny Roberts Jr., who took a surprise front row place by only being +0.092 seconds off the pace of Pedrosa - and teammate Nicky Hayden in third place. The second row of the grid consists out of Shinya Nakano on the Kawasaki in fourth, Loris Capirossi in fifth and Marco Melandri in sixth position. Rossi meanwhile only managed to qualify a lowly tenth and thus was down on the fourth row of the grid. Another rookie - Casey Stoner - did not participate in the race due to a concussion he sustained after a crash earlier that day during the warm-up practice.

All riders take off and do their usual warm-up lap before lining up in their respective grid slots. As the lights go out, Pedrosa has a great start and retains his lead going into the Coca-Cola Kurve (Turn 1) on the opening lap. Roberts Jr. retains his position, as does Hayden in third. Makoto Tamada meanwhile has also had a fantastic start, passing multiple riders from ninth to move up into fourth place. Capirossi and Melandri have swapped places, Melandri now being fifth and Capirossi sixth. At Turn 3, Capirossi then loses another place to John Hopkins and another one at the Castrol Omega (Turn 4) to a fast charging Rossi, demoting him to eighth place in just four corners. He is now ahead of Nakano - who had a bad start and lost a few places as well. Halfway into the lap, the top five have started to open up a slight gap back to sixth place Hopkins. Inside that group, Hayden is also opening up a slight gap to Roberts Jr, with Pedrosa harassing him all throughout the lap. At the Sachsen Kurve (Turn 13), Rossi makes a move on Hopkins for sixth by diving down his inside. A similar move is also done by Hayden on both Roberts Jr. and Pedrosa at the same corner, making a very late lunge and taking the lead on the exit of the corner.

On lap two, both Tamada and Melandri pass Roberts Jr. at the beginning and exit of the Coca-Cola Kurve, promoting both to third and fourth place. At the Sachsen Kurve, Melandri tries to pass Tamada for third but runs wide, allowing the Japanese to retake the place upon exit. This move also allows Roberts Jr. and Rossi to close right up.

Lap three and at the end of the start/finish straight, Melandri goes for a pass on Tamada again, this time at the entrance of the Coca-Cola Kurve. He goes up his inside and this time successfully takes third from him. Sixth place Rossi is still right behind the American, trying to pass him at the Sachsen Kurve but not being able to. Home hero Alex Hofmann meanwhile has retired from the race.

On lap four, Melandri sets the fastest lap of the race. Rossi this time manages to get past Roberts Jr. at the Sachsen Kurve, moving him up into fifth place.

Lap five and Pedrosa tries a move on teammate Hayden but has a moment going into the Coca-Cola Kurve, opting to stick behind him for the time being. Rossi has quickly closed the tiny gap to Tamada and is behind him all throughout the lap.

On lap six, Capirossi - who had regained the places he had lost earlier - is now right on the back of Roberts Jr. and tries to find a way past. The top six now consists out of Hayden, Pedrosa, Melandri, Tamada, Rossi and Roberts Jr..

As Hayden crosses the lap to start lap seven, it is Tamada who passes Melandri for third position at the start/finish straight, finalising the pass at the entrance of the Coca-Cola Kurve. Entering the Sachsen Kurve, Melandri tries to line up a pass by diving down the inside of Tamada but gets blocked and has to stay behind instead.

Lap eight and Melandri manages to take third from Tamada at the same corner where he tried to pass the Japanese rider one lap earlier, the Sachsen Kurve.

On lap nine, Tamada retries to take third by using the power of his Konica Minolta Honda and blast pass, only to run slightly wide upon entrance of the Coca-Cola Kurve and having to give back the position to Melandri. At the Sachsen Kurve, Melandri goes up the inside of Pedrosa and takes second, with Rossi doing likewise to Tamada for third. The Japanese tries to fight back at the Queckenberg Kurve (Turn 14), but has to slot in behind Rossi.

Lap ten and Rossi runs a bit wide exiting the Queckenberg Kurve, allowing Tamada to blast past the Camel Yamaha rider and take back third place at the start/finish straight. At the Sachsen Kurve, Rossi makes a clean move down the inside of Tamada and retakes third.

On lap eleven, Melandri takes over the lead as he passes Hayden at the start/finish straight, entering the Coca-Cola Kurve. Tamada tries to take third place back from Rossi but this time is not able to. Pedrosa then follows suit at Castrol Omega, taking a shorter line and going side by side with Hayden, exiting the corner ahead of him. At the Sachsen Kurve, Rossi then makes his move and passes Hayden for third. Roberts Jr. then tries to pass Tamada for fourth place at the Queckenberg Kurve but takes a line that is too tight, losing the front end and striking an unfortunate Tamada along with him into the gravel. The Japanese rider then grabs his leg, visibly shown in pain.

Lap twelve and the lead group now consists out of four riders: Melandri, Pedrosa, Rossi and Hayden. Roberts Jr. is shown kneeling next to him, trying to ask him if he is okay. The retirement of the two riders now moves up Capirossi into fifth and Nakano into sixth position. At the Sachsen Kurve, Rossi passes Pedrosa for second by diving down his inside.

On lap thirteen, Capirossi has managed to close the gap and is now right behind Hayden, making it a five-way battle for victory. At the Sachsen Kurve, Rossi overtakes Melandri and takes over the lead by going up his inside. At Turn 9, Melandri makes a small mistake and allows Rossi to pull a slight gap.

Lap fifteen and Pedrosa overtakes Melandri as the Italian goes slightly wide and he takes a tighter line entering Castrol Omega, moving him up into second position.

On lap sixteen, Pedrosa and Melandri have slowly closed the gap to Rossi, opening up a small gap of their own to Hayden. No overtakes happened at the front.

Lap seventeen and the top four now consists out of Rossi, Pedrosa, Melandri and Hayden Fifth placed Capirossi is starting to lose connection to the top four by now.

On lap eighteen, the front is stable and no overtakes happened. Capirossi's gap to sixth place Nakano is +1.816 seconds.

Lap nineteen and Hayden's gap to Capirossi is now +1.248 seconds. Melandri closes up to Pedrosa and has a look up the inside of the Spaniard at the Sachsen Kurve, but stays behind for now.

On lap twenty, the front is still stable and no one has made any overtakes so far.

Lap twenty-one and Rossi's bike is now sliding a bit as the tyres start to wear for everyone. Pedrosa is still shadowing him in second. At the Sachsen Kurve, Melandri finally makes a move and passes Pedrosa on the inside for second position.

As Rossi crosses the line to start lap twenty-two, Hayden goes side by side with Pedrosa at the start/finish straight and tries to overtake him on the outside at the entrance of the Coca-Cola Kurve, failing to do so and having to settle for fourth.

On lap twenty-three, Melandri is all over the back of Rossi during the lap but is not able to make a move. No overtakes happen at the front.

Lap twenty-four and Pedrosa passes Melandri at the inside of the Coca-Coca Kurve, promoting him up into second place. At the Sachsen Kurve, Melandri takes back second position from Pedrosa. The Spaniard tries to retake it but decides to stay behind for now as they enter the Queckenberg Kurve.

On lap twenty-five, Pedrosa tries a move up the inside of Melandri by taking the shorter line at Castrol Omega, but gets blocked off by Melandri mid-corner, forcing him to back off.

Lap twenty-six and Pedrosa takes second from Melandri, this time executing to perfection the move he tried earlier on the Italian at Castrol Omega. At the Sachsen Kurve, Pedrosa runs wide and allows both Melandri and Hayden to overtake him, making him lose two positions in one corner.

On lap twenty-seven, Rossi now has pulled a small gap back to Melandri, who himself has opened up a small gap to Hayden and Pedrosa. Melandri however catches up this small gap rather quickly.

Crossing the line to start lap twenty-eight, Melandri makes a very late lunge down the inside of Rossi to take over the lead at the front. This has allowed the Repsol Honda duo of Hayden and Pedrosa to close up on the top two again. Melandri has pulled a small gap back to Rossi but closes it as soon as he enters the Sachsen Kurve - where he also thinks of a move up his inside but stays behind for now.

As Melandri crosses the line to start lap twenty-nine - the penultimate lap - Pedrosa goes side by side with his American teammate for second, Hayden then going a bit wide but somehow retaining third as he tries to overtake Rossi on the outside of the Coca-Cola Kurve but isn't able to. Melandri has again pulled a slight gap to Rossi. Pedrosa then tries to take Hayden at Castrol Omega by going in with a tighter line, the Spaniard not being able to pass when Hayden closes the door and causing the pair to almost collide in the process. This has allowed Rossi and Pedrosa to form a big enough gap to make it a two-way fight for the lead. Rossi is now all over the back of Melandri and takes back the lead at the Sachsen Kurve, going up his inside.

The final lap - lap thirty - begins and Melandri tries to retake first place at the start/finish straight, Rossi blocking him off entering the Coca-Cola Kurve. This however has caused Rossi to have a slight moment but is able to retain the lead. Hayden then tries to form a pass on the outside of Melandri after he closed the gap to him again on the previous lap, the American not being able to as he now comes under pressure from Pedrosa again. Melandri is harassing Rossi all throughout the lap, Pedrosa doing likewise to Hayden. Exiting the fast right-handed Turn 12, Melandri tries to go up the inside of Rossi but the Italian holds on going into the long straight before the Sachsen Kurve. Melandri then tries a move around the outside of this corner, with Rossi blocking the inside off and forcing him all the way onto the kerb. Behind them, Pedrosa takes a wider line entering the Sachsen Kurve to have a better drive exiting it, allowing him to go side by side as the Repsol Honda pair enter the Queckenberg Kurve for the final time. Melandri tries once more to pass Rossi on the outside of the last turn, but Rossi once again relegates him to the outside, allowing him to cross the line and win the race - his fourth win of the season - with Melandri coming home in second place. Behind them, it looks to be Pedrosa who has taken third from Hayden on the line as he exits the corner, but Hayden has held on and narrowly crosses the line ahead of the Spaniard in third, with Pedrosa finishing fourth. Further back, Capirossi, who was starting to be caught by Nakano, crosses the line fifth, Nakano in sixth.

On the parade lap, Rossi stops as the fans swarm the track to side around a happy Rossi, along with the marshalls and some of the press. One of the two cremembers put on a shirt of Marco Materazzi, the footballer who scored the crucial goal against France during the penalty shoot-out in the finals of the 2006 FIFA World Cup, which had concluded in Germany a week before the race. Hayden also waves to the crowd.

Going onto the podium, Rossi was still wearing the shirt of Materazzi but took it off before appearing on the podium. However, he took the shirt with him and as the other two riders stand on the podium already, he puts the shirt back on as the audience gives him a loud applause and cheers. He congratulates the other riders, then a crewmembers adjusts his shirt in the back. He then steps on the top step of the podium as Hermann Tomczyk hands the third-place trophy to Hayden, Jean-Pierre Mougin hands out the second-place trophy to Melandri and Georg Milbradt hands the winners trophy to Rossi. As he receives the trophy, the crowd once again jubilantly cheers as 'The Doctor' raises the trophy. Tomczyk also hands out the constructors trophy to the crew chief of the Camel Yamaha team. The Italian national anthem plays for Rossi and as it stops, the champagne gets handed out. As soon as Rossi receives it, he cheekily sprays one of the grid girls, as does Melandri.

Rossi's victory and Hayden's third place now means that Hayden extends his title hunt, with Rossi catching him ever so slowly. Hayden still sits first with 169 points, followed by Rossi who passes Pedrosa in the standings with 143 points. In third place is Pedrosa with 140 points.

== MotoGP classification ==
Pos.	No.	Rider	Team	Manufacturer	Laps	Time/Retired	Grid	Points
1	46	(Italy) Valentino Rossi	Camel Yamaha Team	Yamaha	30	41:59.248	10	25
2	33	(Italy) Marco Melandri	Fortuna Honda	Honda	30	+0.145	6	20
3	69	(United States) Nicky Hayden	Repsol Honda Team	Honda	30	+0.266	3	16
4	26	(Spain) Dani Pedrosa	Repsol Honda Team	Honda	30	+0.307	1	13
5	65	(Italy) Loris Capirossi	Ducati Marlboro Team	Ducati	30	+8.764	5	11
6	56	(Japan) Shinya Nakano	Kawasaki Racing Team	Kawasaki	30	+9.147	4	10
7	71	(Australia) Chris Vermeulen	Rizla Suzuki MotoGP	Suzuki	30	+16.608	13	9
8	15	(Spain) Sete Gibernau	Ducati Marlboro Team	Ducati	30	+16.648	7	8
9	7	(Spain) Carlos Checa	Tech 3 Yamaha	Yamaha	30	+17.097	11	7
10	21	(United States) John Hopkins	Rizla Suzuki MotoGP	Suzuki	30	+17.786	8	6
11	24	(Spain) Toni Elías	Fortuna Honda	Honda	30	+27.425	15	5
12	5	(United States) Colin Edwards	Camel Yamaha Team	Yamaha	30	+29.308	14	4
13	77	(United Kingdom) James Ellison	Tech 3 Yamaha	Yamaha	30	+1:02.029	17	3
14	30	(Spain) José Luis Cardoso	Pramac d'Antin MotoGP	Ducati	30	+1:19.997	18	2
Ret	17	(France) Randy de Puniet	Kawasaki Racing Team	Kawasaki	12	Retirement	12	
Ret	6	(Japan) Makoto Tamada	Konica Minolta Honda	Honda	10	Accident	9	
Ret	10	(United States) Kenny Roberts Jr.	Team Roberts	KR211V	10	Accident	2	
Ret	66	(Germany) Alex Hofmann	Pramac d'Antin MotoGP	Ducati	2	Retirement	16	
DNS	27	(Australia) Casey Stoner	Honda LCR	Honda		Did not start		

== 250 cc classification ==
Pos.	No.	Rider	Manufacturer	Laps	Time/Retired	Grid	Points
1	55	(Japan) Yuki Takahashi	Honda	29	41:30.350	2	25
2	7	(San Marino) Alex de Angelis	Aprilia	29	+0.058	5	20
3	48	(Spain) Jorge Lorenzo	Aprilia	29	+1.013	1	16
4	34	(Italy) Andrea Dovizioso	Honda	29	+4.021	8	13
5	80	(Spain) Héctor Barberá	Aprilia	29	+9.384	3	11
6	15	(Italy) Roberto Locatelli	Aprilia	29	+19.242	4	10
7	14	(Australia) Anthony West	Aprilia	29	+26.457	7	9
8	4	(Japan) Hiroshi Aoyama	KTM	29	+26.607	6	8
9	73	(Japan) Shuhei Aoyama	Honda	29	+26.741	10	7
10	50	(France) Sylvain Guintoli	Aprilia	29	+30.621	11	6
11	25	(Italy) Alex Baldolini	Aprilia	29	+44.754	12	5
12	9	(Italy) Franco Battaini	Aprilia	29	+45.063	18	4
13	54	(San Marino) Manuel Poggiali	KTM	29	+48.793	13	3
14	96	(Czech Republic) Jakub Smrž	Aprilia	29	+52.317	15	2
15	42	(Spain) Aleix Espargaró	Honda	29	+52.369	19	1
16	28	(Germany) Dirk Heidolf	Aprilia	29	+52.577	14	
17	37	(Argentina) Fabricio Perren	Honda	29	+1:00.025	20	
18	16	(France) Jules Cluzel	Aprilia	29	+1:12.090	25	
19	45	(United Kingdom) Dan Linfoot	Honda	28	+1 lap	23	
20	24	(Spain) Jordi Carchano	Aprilia	28	+1 lap	21	
21	22	(Italy) Luca Morelli	Aprilia	28	+1 lap	26	
22	78	(Germany) Meik Kevin Minnerop	Honda	28	+1 lap	30	
23	17	(Germany) Franz Aschenbrenner	Honda	28	+1 lap	29	
Ret	67	(Sweden) Nicklas Cajback	Aprilia	21	Retirement	27	
Ret	58	(Italy) Marco Simoncelli	Gilera	14	Accident	9	
Ret	21	(France) Arnaud Vincent	Honda	11	Retirement	24	
Ret	79	(Sweden) Andreas Mårtensson	Aprilia	7	Accident	28	
Ret	36	(Colombia) Martín Cárdenas	Honda	5	Accident	16	
Ret	23	(Spain) Arturo Tizón	Honda	4	Retirement	17	
Ret	8	(Italy) Andrea Ballerini	Aprilia	3	Accident	22	
WD	85	(Italy) Alessio Palumbo	Aprilia		Withdrew		

== 125 cc classification ==
Pos.	No.	Rider	Manufacturer	Laps	Time/Retired	Grid	Points
1	75	(Italy) Mattia Pasini	Aprilia	27	39:44.091	3	25
2	19	(Spain) Álvaro Bautista	Aprilia	27	+0.010	2	20
3	52	(Czech Republic) Lukáš Pešek	Derbi	27	+0.111	1	16
4	55	(Spain) Héctor Faubel	Aprilia	27	+9.298	10	13
5	24	(Italy) Simone Corsi	Gilera	27	+9.372	9	11
6	1	(Switzerland) Thomas Lüthi	Honda	27	+10.570	13	10
7	18	(Spain) Nicolás Terol	Derbi	27	+11.835	5	9
8	36	(Finland) Mika Kallio	KTM	27	+11.905	4	8
9	6	(Spain) Joan Olivé	Aprilia	27	+26.017	16	7
10	33	(Spain) Sergio Gadea	Aprilia	27	+26.172	12	6
11	32	(Italy) Fabrizio Lai	Honda	27	+26.361	6	5
12	38	(United Kingdom) Bradley Smith	Honda	27	+26.389	14	4
13	11	(Germany) Sandro Cortese	Honda	27	+26.480	11	3
14	14	(Hungary) Gábor Talmácsi	Honda	27	+26.606	7	2
15	71	(Japan) Tomoyoshi Koyama	Malaguti	27	+27.068	15	1
16	54	(Switzerland) Randy Krummenacher	KTM	27	+27.192	21	
17	8	(Italy) Lorenzo Zanetti	Aprilia	27	+46.145	23	
18	17	(Germany) Stefan Bradl	KTM	27	+46.201	18	
19	95	(Germany) Georg Fröhlich	Honda	27	+56.274	28	
20	35	(Italy) Raffaele De Rosa	Aprilia	27	+56.549	25	
21	26	(Switzerland) Vincent Braillard	Aprilia	27	+56.782	31	
22	12	(Italy) Federico Sandi	Aprilia	27	+57.073	27	
23	15	(Italy) Michele Pirro	Aprilia	27	+57.474	22	
24	29	(Italy) Andrea Iannone	Aprilia	27	+57.707	20	
25	7	(France) Alexis Masbou	Malaguti	27	+1:04.698	37	
26	16	(Italy) Michele Conti	Honda	27	+1:04.793	32	
27	45	(Hungary) Imre Tóth	Aprilia	27	+1:07.754	19	
28	43	(Spain) Manuel Hernández	Aprilia	27	+1:17.323	30	
29	23	(Italy) Lorenzo Baroni	Honda	27	+1:17.507	26	
30	21	(Spain) Mateo Túnez	Aprilia	27	+1:20.583	29	
31	34	(Spain) Esteve Rabat	Honda	27	+1:24.772	39	
32	98	(Germany) Toni Wirsing	Honda	26	+1 lap	42	
Ret	61	(Germany) Robin Lässer	KTM	17	Retirement	36	
Ret	44	(Czech Republic) Karel Abraham	Aprilia	16	Retirement	33	
Ret	13	(Italy) Dino Lombardi	Aprilia	13	Retirement	41	
Ret	37	(Netherlands) Joey Litjens	Honda	11	Retirement	38	
Ret	22	(Spain) Pablo Nieto	Aprilia	9	Retirement	8	
Ret	83	(France) Clément Dunikowski	Honda	7	Retirement	40	
Ret	53	(Italy) Simone Grotzkyj	Aprilia	6	Accident	35	
Ret	72	(Germany) Eric Hübsch	Aprilia	5	Retirement	34	
Ret	20	(Italy) Roberto Tamburini	Aprilia	4	Accident	24	
Ret	10	(Spain) Ángel Rodríguez	Aprilia	1	Retirement	17	
DNS	97	(Germany) Joshua Sommer	Aprilia		Did not start		

== Championship standings after the race (MotoGP) ==
Below are the standings for the top five riders and constructors after round ten has concluded.

Riders' Championship standings

Pos.	Rider	Points
1	(United States) Nicky Hayden	169
2	(Italy) Valentino Rossi	143
3	(Spain) Dani Pedrosa	140
4	(Italy) Marco Melandri	134
5	(Italy) Loris Capirossi	118

Constructors' Championship standings

Pos.	Constructor	Points
1	(Japan) Honda	221
2	(Japan) Yamaha	172
3	(Italy) Ducati	127
4	(Japan) Suzuki	81
5	(Japan) Kawasaki	71

- Note: Only the top five positions are included for both sets of standings.

Previous race: 2006 British Grand Prix	FIM Grand Prix World Championship; 2006 season	Next race: 2006 United States Grand Prix
Previous race: 2005 German Grand Prix	German motorcycle Grand Prix	Next race: 2007 German Grand Prix
