= 2007 Japanese motorcycle Grand Prix =

(Japan) 2007 Japanese Grand Prix
Race details
- Race 15 of 18 races in the 2007 Grand Prix motorcycle racing season
- Date: 23 September 2007
- Official name: A-Style Grand Prix of Japan
- Location: Twin Ring Motegi
- Course: Permanent racing facility; 4.801 km (2.983 mi)

MotoGP
Pole position
- Rider: (Spain) Dani Pedrosa
- Time: 1:45.864
Fastest lap
- Rider: (Spain) Toni Elías
- Time: 1:50.718
Podium
- First: (Italy) Loris Capirossi
- Second: (France) Randy de Puniet
- Third: (Spain) Toni Elías

250cc
Pole position
- Rider: (Japan) Shuhei Aoyama
- Time: 1:51.327
Fastest lap
- Rider: (Italy) Andrea Dovizioso
- Time: 2:04.160
Podium
- First: (Finland) Mika Kallio
- Second: (Italy) Andrea Dovizioso
- Third: (Spain) Hector Barbera

125cc
Pole position
- Rider: (Italy) Mattia Pasini
- Time: 1:57.301
Fastest lap
- Rider: (Italy) Raffaele De Rosa
- Time: 2:10.998
Podium
- First: (Italy) Mattia Pasini
- Second: (Hungary) Gábor Talmácsi
- Third: (Spain) Héctor Faubel

The 2007 Japanese motorcycle Grand Prix was the fifteenth round of the 2007 MotoGP championship. It was held on 21–23 September at Twin Ring Motegi, Motegi, Tochigi. Loris Capirossi won the MotoGP race, his last career victory, as well the last victory for a Ducati rider other than Casey Stoner until the 2016 Austrian motorcycle Grand Prix. Even more significant for the Ducati team was that teammate Stoner secured his and Ducati's first MotoGP title with a sixth place, the only title for a Ducati rider until 2022.

== MotoGP classification ==
Pos.	No.	Rider	Team	Manufacturer	Laps	Time/Retired	Grid	Points
1	65	(Italy) Loris Capirossi	Ducati Marlboro Team	Ducati	24	47:05.484	8	25
2	14	(France) Randy de Puniet	Kawasaki Racing Team	Kawasaki	24	+10.853	4	20
3	24	(Spain) Toni Elías	Honda Gresini	Honda	24	+11.526	5	16
4	50	(France) Sylvain Guintoli	Dunlop Yamaha Tech 3	Yamaha	24	+12.192	18	13
5	33	(Italy) Marco Melandri	Honda Gresini	Honda	24	+28.569	10	11
6	27	(Australia) Casey Stoner	Ducati Marlboro Team	Ducati	24	+31.179	9	10
7	13	(Australia) Anthony West	Kawasaki Racing Team	Kawasaki	24	+50.001	6	9
8	4	(Brazil) Alex Barros	Pramac d'Antin	Ducati	24	+52.343	15	8
9	1	(United States) Nicky Hayden	Repsol Honda Team	Honda	24	+53.629	3	7
10	21	(United States) John Hopkins	Rizla Suzuki MotoGP	Suzuki	24	+59.715	11	6
11	71	(Australia) Chris Vermeulen	Rizla Suzuki MotoGP	Suzuki	24	+1:02.804	17	5
12	6	(Japan) Makoto Tamada	Dunlop Yamaha Tech 3	Yamaha	24	+1:09.313	16	4
13	46	(Italy) Valentino Rossi	Fiat Yamaha Team	Yamaha	24	+1:09.699	2	3
14	5	(United States) Colin Edwards	Fiat Yamaha Team	Yamaha	24	+1:11.735	7	2
15	72	(Japan) Shinichi Ito	Pramac d'Antin	Ducati	24	+1:12.290	20	1
16	56	(Japan) Shinya Nakano	Konica Minolta Honda	Honda	24	+1:32.979	12	
17	87	(Japan) Akira Yanagawa	Kawasaki Racing Team	Kawasaki	23	+1 lap	19	
18	7	(Spain) Carlos Checa	Honda LCR	Honda	23	+1 lap	14	
Ret	64	(Japan) Kousuke Akiyoshi	Rizla Suzuki MotoGP	Suzuki	20	Retirement	13	
Ret	26	(Spain) Dani Pedrosa	Repsol Honda Team	Honda	14	Accident	1	
Ret	80	(United States) Kurtis Roberts	Team Roberts	KR212V	1	Retirement	21	

== 250 cc classification ==
Pos.	No.	Rider	Manufacturer	Laps	Time/Retired	Grid	Points
1	36	(Finland) Mika Kallio	KTM	23	48:28.585	5	25
2	34	(Italy) Andrea Dovizioso	Honda	23	+4.893	2	20
3	80	(Spain) Héctor Barberá	Aprilia	23	+21.527	4	16
4	55	(Japan) Yuki Takahashi	Honda	23	+23.488	8	13
5	3	(San Marino) Alex de Angelis	Aprilia	23	+25.378	9	11
6	60	(Spain) Julián Simón	Honda	23	+42.264	7	10
7	58	(Italy) Marco Simoncelli	Gilera	23	+48.782	12	9
8	4	(Japan) Hiroshi Aoyama	KTM	23	+57.782	6	8
9	73	(Japan) Shuhei Aoyama	Honda	23	+1:09.049	1	7
10	12	(Switzerland) Thomas Lüthi	Aprilia	23	+1:10.837	10	6
11	1	(Spain) Jorge Lorenzo	Aprilia	23	+1:13.035	3	5
12	76	(Japan) Seijin Oikawa	Yamaha	23	+1:26.371	28	4
13	16	(France) Jules Cluzel	Aprilia	23	+1:36.236	25	3
14	75	(Japan) Youichi Ui	Yamaha	23	+1:47.098	17	2
15	19	(Spain) Álvaro Bautista	Aprilia	23	+1:50.081	11	1
16	15	(Italy) Roberto Locatelli	Gilera	23	+1:58.741	13	
17	41	(Spain) Aleix Espargaró	Aprilia	23	+2:06.782	22	
18	10	(Hungary) Imre Tóth	Aprilia	23	+2:10.415	23	
19	50	(Republic of Ireland) Eugene Laverty	Honda	22	+1 lap	21	
20	77	(Japan) Yuki Hamamoto	Yamaha	22	+1 lap	26	
Ret	45	(United Kingdom) Dan Linfoot	Aprilia	19	Accident	27	
Ret	32	(Italy) Fabrizio Lai	Aprilia	17	Retirement	15	
Ret	20	(Japan) Takumi Takahashi	Honda	3	Retirement	16	
Ret	8	(Thailand) Ratthapark Wilairot	Honda	2	Accident	14	
Ret	28	(Germany) Dirk Heidolf	Aprilia	1	Accident	20	
Ret	17	(Czech Republic) Karel Abraham	Aprilia	0	Accident	19	
Ret	25	(Italy) Alex Baldolini	Aprilia	0	Accident	18	
Ret	7	(Spain) Efrén Vázquez	Aprilia	0	Accident	24	
OFFICIAL 250cc REPORT

== 125 cc classification ==
Pos.	No.	Rider	Manufacturer	Laps	Time/Retired	Grid	Points
1	75	(Italy) Mattia Pasini	Aprilia	21	46:29.900	1	25
2	14	(Hungary) Gábor Talmácsi	Aprilia	21	+2.985	3	20
3	55	(Spain) Héctor Faubel	Aprilia	21	+22.405	4	16
4	63	(France) Mike Di Meglio	Honda	21	+33.751	12	13
5	6	(Spain) Joan Olivé	Aprilia	21	+37.351	7	11
6	24	(Italy) Simone Corsi	Aprilia	21	+39.062	6	10
7	22	(Spain) Pablo Nieto	Aprilia	21	+44.488	20	9
8	33	(Spain) Sergio Gadea	Aprilia	21	+48.901	11	8
9	60	(Austria) Michael Ranseder	Derbi	21	+50.672	21	7
10	29	(Italy) Andrea Iannone	Aprilia	21	+56.674	19	6
11	77	(Switzerland) Dominique Aegerter	Aprilia	21	+1:03.588	26	5
12	52	(Czech Republic) Lukáš Pešek	Derbi	21	+1:10.334	8	4
13	99	(United Kingdom) Danny Webb	Honda	21	+1:14.579	29	3
14	71	(Japan) Tomoyoshi Koyama	KTM	21	+1:19.549	2	2
15	17	(Germany) Stefan Bradl	Aprilia	21	+1:23.255	13	1
16	20	(Italy) Roberto Tamburini	Aprilia	21	+1:28.289	24	
17	18	(Spain) Nicolás Terol	Derbi	21	+1:30.061	14	
18	74	(Japan) Kazuma Watanabe	Honda	21	+1:30.554	32	
19	34	(Switzerland) Randy Krummenacher	KTM	21	+1:35.406	17	
20	69	(Japan) Nayuta Mizuno	Yamaha	21	+1:42.793	36	
21	7	(France) Alexis Masbou	Honda	21	+2:05.969	22	
22	58	(Japan) Shoya Tomizawa	Honda	17	+4 laps	30	
Ret	53	(Italy) Simone Grotzkyj	Aprilia	20	Accident	27	
Ret	44	(Spain) Pol Espargaró	Aprilia	17	Retirement	16	
Ret	59	(Japan) Iori Namihira	Honda	14	Accident	31	
Ret	8	(Italy) Lorenzo Zanetti	Aprilia	12	Retirement	18	
Ret	38	(United Kingdom) Bradley Smith	Honda	9	Retirement	5	
Ret	12	(Spain) Esteve Rabat	Honda	9	Accident	15	
Ret	27	(Italy) Stefano Bianco	Aprilia	8	Accident	23	
Ret	95	(Romania) Robert Mureșan	Derbi	8	Accident	28	
Ret	51	(United States) Stevie Bonsey	KTM	7	Accident	25	
Ret	11	(Germany) Sandro Cortese	Aprilia	7	Retirement	10	
Ret	15	(Italy) Federico Sandi	Aprilia	6	Retirement	34	
Ret	35	(Italy) Raffaele De Rosa	Aprilia	5	Accident	9	
Ret	57	(Japan) Yuuichi Yanagisawa	Honda	5	Accident	35	
Ret	13	(Italy) Dino Lombardi	Honda	3	Accident	33	
OFFICIAL 125cc REPORT

== Championship standings after the race (MotoGP) ==
Below are the standings for the top five riders and constructors after round fifteen has concluded.

Riders' Championship standings

Pos.	Rider	Points
1	(Australia) Casey Stoner	297
2	(Italy) Valentino Rossi	214
3	(Spain) Dani Pedrosa	188
4	(United States) John Hopkins	156
5	(Australia) Chris Vermeulen	152

Constructors' Championship standings

Pos.	Constructor	Points
1	(Italy) Ducati	324
2	(Japan) Honda	255
3	(Japan) Yamaha	251
4	(Japan) Suzuki	207
5	(Japan) Kawasaki	114

- Note: Only the top five positions are included for both sets of standings.

Previous race: 2007 Portuguese Grand Prix	FIM Grand Prix World Championship; 2007 season	Next race: 2007 Australian Grand Prix
Previous race: 2006 Japanese Grand Prix	Japanese motorcycle Grand Prix	Next race: 2008 Japanese Grand Prix
