= 2007 Catalan motorcycle Grand Prix =

(Catalonia) 2007 Catalan Grand Prix
Race details
- Race 7 of 18 races in the 2007 Grand Prix motorcycle racing season
- Date: 10 June 2007
- Official name: Gran Premi Cinzano de Catalunya
- Location: Circuit de Catalunya
- Course: Permanent racing facility; 4.727 km (2.937 mi)

MotoGP
Pole position
- Rider: (Italy) Valentino Rossi
- Time: 1:41.840
Fastest lap
- Rider: (United States) John Hopkins
- Time: 1:43.242
Podium
- First: (Australia) Casey Stoner
- Second: (Italy) Valentino Rossi
- Third: (Spain) Dani Pedrosa

250cc
Pole position
- Rider: (Spain) Jorge Lorenzo
- Time: 1:45.098
Fastest lap
- Rider: (San Marino) Alex de Angelis
- Time: 1:45.925
Podium
- First: (Spain) Jorge Lorenzo
- Second: (San Marino) Alex de Angelis
- Third: (Italy) Andrea Dovizioso

125cc
Pole position
- Rider: (Hungary) Gábor Talmácsi
- Time: 1:50.012
Fastest lap
- Rider: (Switzerland) Randy Krummenacher
- Time: 1:50.732
Podium
- First: (Japan) Tomoyoshi Koyama
- Second: (Hungary) Gábor Talmácsi
- Third: (Switzerland) Randy Krummenacher

The 2007 Grand Prix of Catalunya was the seventh round of the 2007 MotoGP championship. It took place on the weekend of 8–10 June 2007 at the Circuit de Catalunya in Barcelona, Catalonia.

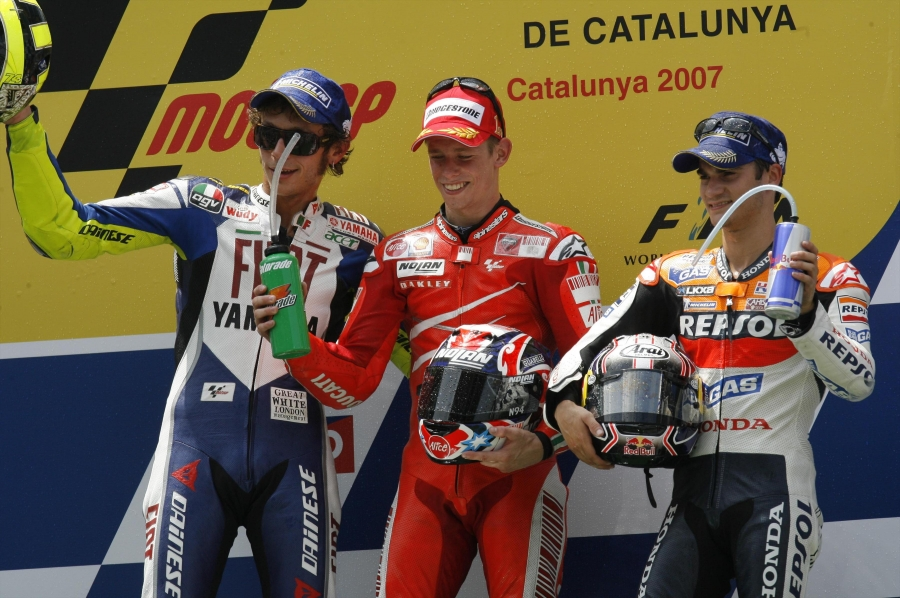
Valentino Rossi, Casey Stoner and Dani Pedrosa, celebrating on the podium after finishing second, first and third in the MotoGP race.

== MotoGP classification ==
Pos.	No.	Rider	Team	Manufacturer	Laps	Time/Retired	Grid	Points
1	27	(Australia) Casey Stoner	Ducati Marlboro Team	Ducati	25	43:16.907	4	25
2	46	(Italy) Valentino Rossi	Fiat Yamaha Team	Yamaha	25	+0.069	1	20
3	26	(Spain) Dani Pedrosa	Repsol Honda Team	Honda	25	+0.390	3	16
4	21	(United States) John Hopkins	Rizla Suzuki MotoGP	Suzuki	25	+7.814	5	13
5	14	(France) Randy de Puniet	Kawasaki Racing Team	Kawasaki	25	+17.853	2	11
6	65	(Italy) Loris Capirossi	Ducati Marlboro Team	Ducati	25	+19.409	17	10
7	71	(Australia) Chris Vermeulen	Rizla Suzuki MotoGP	Suzuki	25	+19.495	11	9
8	4	(Brazil) Alex Barros	Pramac d'Antin	Ducati	25	+24.862	14	8
9	33	(Italy) Marco Melandri	Honda Gresini	Honda	25	+24.963	9	7
10	5	(United States) Colin Edwards	Fiat Yamaha Team	Yamaha	25	+35.348	6	6
11	1	(United States) Nicky Hayden	Repsol Honda Team	Honda	25	+36.301	7	5
12	6	(Japan) Makoto Tamada	Dunlop Yamaha Tech 3	Yamaha	25	+38.720	16	4
13	66	(Germany) Alex Hofmann	Pramac d'Antin	Ducati	25	+40.934	10	3
14	50	(France) Sylvain Guintoli	Dunlop Yamaha Tech 3	Yamaha	25	+44.399	13	2
15	56	(Japan) Shinya Nakano	Konica Minolta Honda	Honda	25	+54.103	12	1
16	10	(United States) Kenny Roberts Jr.	Team Roberts	KR212V	25	+59.655	18	
17	7	(Spain) Carlos Checa	Honda LCR	Honda	25	+1:02.315	15	
18	80	(United States) Kurtis Roberts	Team Roberts	KR212V	25	+1:03.322	19	
Ret	24	(Spain) Toni Elías	Honda Gresini	Honda	14	Retirement	8	
WD	19	(France) Olivier Jacque	Kawasaki Racing Team	Kawasaki		Withdrew		

== 250 cc classification ==
Pos.	No.	Rider	Manufacturer	Laps	Time/Retired	Grid	Points
1	1	(Spain) Jorge Lorenzo	Aprilia	23	+40:51.620	1	25
2	3	(San Marino) Alex de Angelis	Aprilia	23	+3.194	5	20
3	34	(Italy) Andrea Dovizioso	Honda	23	+10.596	7	16
4	12	(Switzerland) Thomas Lüthi	Aprilia	23	+17.100	4	13
5	19	(Spain) Álvaro Bautista	Aprilia	23	+20.298	6	11
6	36	(Finland) Mika Kallio	KTM	23	+20.566	12	10
7	4	(Japan) Hiroshi Aoyama	KTM	23	+20.615	8	9
8	80	(Spain) Héctor Barberá	Aprilia	23	+23.584	2	8
9	58	(Italy) Marco Simoncelli	Gilera	23	+36.703	9	7
10	60	(Spain) Julián Simón	Honda	23	+36.767	11	6
11	73	(Japan) Shuhei Aoyama	Honda	23	+39.592	13	5
12	15	(Italy) Roberto Locatelli	Gilera	23	+48.028	15	4
13	16	(France) Jules Cluzel	Aprilia	23	+1:07.085	25	3
14	17	(Czech Republic) Karel Abraham	Aprilia	23	+1:11.868	20	2
15	44	(Japan) Taro Sekiguchi	Aprilia	23	+1:17.387	18	1
16	6	(Spain) Alex Debón	Aprilia	23	+1:19.654	3	
17	8	(Thailand) Ratthapark Wilairot	Honda	23	+1:19.822	22	
18	25	(Italy) Alex Baldolini	Aprilia	23	+1:23.243	19	
19	50	(Republic of Ireland) Eugene Laverty	Honda	23	+1:35.553	23	
20	41	(Spain) Aleix Espargaró	Aprilia	23	+1:42.529	14	
21	14	(Australia) Anthony West	Aprilia	23	+1:55.832	16	
22	10	(Hungary) Imre Tóth	Aprilia	22	+1 lap	26	
23	31	(Spain) Álvaro Molina	Aprilia	22	+1 lap	24	
Ret	55	(Japan) Yuki Takahashi	Honda	22	Accident	10	
Ret	28	(Germany) Dirk Heidolf	Aprilia	15	Retirement	17	
Ret	32	(Italy) Fabrizio Lai	Aprilia	11	Retirement	21	
DNS	9	(Spain) Arturo Tizón	Aprilia		Did not start		
DNQ	53	(Spain) Santiago Barragán	Honda		Did not qualify		
OFFICIAL 250cc REPORT

== 125 cc classification ==
Pos.	No.	Rider	Manufacturer	Laps	Time/Retired	Grid	Points
1	71	(Japan) Tomoyoshi Koyama	KTM	22	41:06.339	7	25
2	14	(Hungary) Gábor Talmácsi	Aprilia	22	+0.049	1	20
3	34	(Switzerland) Randy Krummenacher	KTM	22	+0.131	15	16
4	33	(Spain) Sergio Gadea	Aprilia	22	+0.500	3	13
5	44	(Spain) Pol Espargaró	Aprilia	22	+2.081	18	11
6	38	(United Kingdom) Bradley Smith	Honda	22	+4.792	4	10
7	24	(Italy) Simone Corsi	Aprilia	22	+16.840	9	9
8	6	(Italy) Joan Olivé	Aprilia	22	+16.910	14	8
9	17	(Germany) Stefan Bradl	Aprilia	22	+16.919	13	7
10	60	(Austria) Michael Ranseder	Derbi	22	+16.922	17	6
11	11	(Germany) Sandro Cortese	Aprilia	22	+17.112	11	5
12	12	(Spain) Esteve Rabat	Honda	22	+17.255	12	4
13	52	(Czech Republic) Lukáš Pešek	Derbi	22	+17.263	5	3
14	8	(Italy) Lorenzo Zanetti	Aprilia	22	+23.707	21	2
15	77	(Switzerland) Dominique Aegerter	Aprilia	22	+28.366	27	1
16	7	(France) Alexis Masbou	Honda	22	+28.637	22	
17	29	(Italy) Andrea Iannone	Aprilia	22	+28.658	10	
18	30	(Spain) Pere Tutusaus	Aprilia	22	+29.026	25	
19	63	(France) Mike Di Meglio	Honda	22	+29.619	16	
20	22	(Spain) Pablo Nieto	Aprilia	22	+31.800	20	
21	15	(Italy) Federico Sandi	Aprilia	22	+46.773	26	
22	20	(Italy) Roberto Tamburini	Aprilia	22	+47.361	29	
23	18	(Spain) Nicolás Terol	Derbi	22	+53.881	19	
24	95	(Romania) Robert Mureșan	Derbi	22	+54.045	23	
25	56	(Netherlands) Hugo van den Berg	Aprilia	22	+54.103	24	
26	99	(United Kingdom) Danny Webb	Honda	22	+1:20.170	34	
27	76	(Spain) Iván Maestro	Aprilia	22	+1:36.934	33	
Ret	55	(Spain) Héctor Faubel	Aprilia	18	Retirement	2	
Ret	85	(Austria) Philipp Eitzinger	Honda	12	Retirement	30	
Ret	53	(Italy) Simone Grotzkyj	Aprilia	11	Retirement	28	
Ret	75	(Italy) Mattia Pasini	Aprilia	2	Retirement	8	
Ret	35	(Italy) Raffaele De Rosa	Aprilia	2	Retirement	6	
Ret	51	(United States) Stevie Bonsey	KTM	1	Retirement	32	
Ret	37	(Netherlands) Joey Litjens	Honda	0	Retirement	31	
DNS	13	(Italy) Dino Lombardi	Honda		Did not start		
OFFICIAL 125cc REPORT

== Championship standings after the race (MotoGP) ==
Below are the standings for the top five riders and constructors after round seven has concluded.

Riders' Championship standings

Pos.	Rider	Points
1	(Australia) Casey Stoner	140
2	(Italy) Valentino Rossi	126
3	(Spain) Dani Pedrosa	98
4	(Italy) Marco Melandri	75
5	(Australia) Chris Vermeulen	72

Constructors' Championship standings

Pos.	Constructor	Points
1	(Italy) Ducati	143
2	(Japan) Yamaha	126
3	(Japan) Honda	125
4	(Japan) Suzuki	95
5	(Japan) Kawasaki	39

- Note: Only the top five positions are included for both sets of standings.

Previous race: 2007 Italian Grand Prix	FIM Grand Prix World Championship; 2007 season	Next race: 2007 British Grand Prix
Previous race: 2006 Catalan Grand Prix	Catalan motorcycle Grand Prix	Next race: 2008 Catalan Grand Prix
