= 2007 Australian motorcycle Grand Prix =

(Australia) 2007 Australian Grand Prix
Race details
- Race 16 of 18 races in the 2007 Grand Prix motorcycle racing season
- Date: 14 October 2007
- Official name: GMC Australian Grand Prix
- Location: Phillip Island Grand Prix Circuit
- Course: Permanent racing facility; 4.448 km (2.764 mi)

MotoGP
Pole position
- Rider: (Spain) Dani Pedrosa
- Time: 1:29.201
Fastest lap
- Rider: (Italy) Valentino Rossi
- Time: 1:30.801
Podium
- First: (Australia) Casey Stoner
- Second: (Italy) Loris Capirossi
- Third: (Italy) Valentino Rossi

250cc
Pole position
- Rider: (Spain) Jorge Lorenzo
- Time: 1:32.884
Fastest lap
- Rider: (Spain) Jorge Lorenzo
- Time: 1:33.761
Podium
- First: (Spain) Jorge Lorenzo
- Second: (Spain) Álvaro Bautista
- Third: (Italy) Andrea Dovizioso

125cc
Pole position
- Rider: (Italy) Mattia Pasini
- Time: 1:38.078
Fastest lap
- Rider: (Hungary) Gábor Talmácsi
- Time: 1:38.061
Podium
- First: (Czech Republic) Lukáš Pešek
- Second: (Spain) Joan Olivé
- Third: (Spain) Héctor Faubel

The 2007 Australian motorcycle Grand Prix was the sixteenth round of the 2007 MotoGP championship. It was held over the weekend of 12–14 October 2007 at the Phillip Island Grand Prix Circuit, Philip Island, Victoria.

== MotoGP race report ==
This race was most notable for Casey Stoner's first victory in front of his home crowd, two weeks after the Australian became Ducati's first ever world champion at the previous round in Japan. The team also won the constructors championship, the first time a European manufacturer has done this since 1973.

Dani Pedrosa took pole position on Saturday, followed by Valentino Rossi and Casey Stoner. Nicky Hayden took the first spot on the second row in fourth, Loris Capirossi was fifth and Randy de Puniet in sixth.

All riders take off and do their usual warm-up lap before lining up in their respective grid slots. As the lights went out, Stoner immediately went into the lead on the opening lap going into the Doohan corner. Hayden also managed to pass both Rossi and Pedrosa for second, with Pedrosa and Rossi losing two places (first to third, second to fourth). Capirossi did not make up any positions and was still in fifth place. Stoner and Hayden open up a small gap to Pedrosa and Rossi during the lap.

As lap two begins, Marco Melandri makes a move on the Pramac Ducati of Alex Barros for sixth, overtaking him on the start/finish straight. Rossi then makes a move on Pedrosa for third spot, overtaking him at the Honda Corner as he does not want the two at the front to ride away. However, coming out of the fast, unnamed Turn 12 corner, Rossi went slightly wide and onto the grass, undoing all his hard work and dropping him back to fourth behind Pedrosa.

Lap three and Rossi now needs to make up the lost ground to Pedrosa again. Stoner and Hayden are opening up a gap at the front, with Pedrosa still in third. Capirossi meanwhile is slowly closing in on the two, with Hayden shadowing Stoner all throughout the lap, as does Rossi. Melandri overtakes Capirossi for fifth place at the fast, unnamed Turn 8 right hander. Rossi's rear tyre smokes as he tries to get a better exit out of Turn 12, with Stoner almost going onto the grass as he uses the full kerb for maximum acceleration coming out of Turn 12.

On lap four, Hayden is still trying to get past Stoner but he refuses him the opportunity in the first two corners. Rossi meanwhile finally manages to overtake Pedrosa at the Southern Loop by going through on the inside with a tighter line. Pedrosa tries to get back at him by lining up a pass at the Honda Corner, but fails to brake in time, runs in too deep and loses fourth to Melandri instead. Rossi then tries to close in on the top two.

Lap five and Pedrosa retakes fourth by overtaking Melandri on the start/finish straight, going into Doohan Corner. Melandri takes the position back by outbraking Pedrosa at the Honda corner and at the front, Stoner is slowly opening up a gap to Hayden.

On lap six, Pedrosa overtakes Melandri once more for fourth down at the start/finish straight, with Melandri trying replicate his overtaking manoeuver at the Honda Corner. This time however, he fails as he goes too wide, allowing Pedrosa to keep the place. Rossi also set a fastest lap so far.

As lap seven gets underway, Hayden's gap to Stoner is increasing, with Rossi slowly reeling in Hayden in return. No overtakes happen at the front.

Lap eight and Stoner has a moment exiting the Southern Loop, but he does not lose any time because of it. Still no overtakes at the front.

On lap nine, Nicky Hayden suddenly started to lose ground to Stoner halfway around the lap. Exiting Turn 12, Rossi had almost wholly caught him entering the start/finish straight.

Lap ten and Rossi overtakes an ever fading Hayden into the Doohan Corner, moving him up to second.

On lap eleven, Rossi starts to pull away from Hayden. Pedrosa meanwhile was closing in on Hayden, cutting −0.813 seconds off of the gap.

Lap twelve and Pedrosa has now caught Hayden. Just before Lukey Heights, his bike suddenly slows – a result of motor problems. He sticks out his leg to warn others but almost hits Pedrosa in the process. Furiously, he hits the front of his bike, then rides off into te gravel to retire.

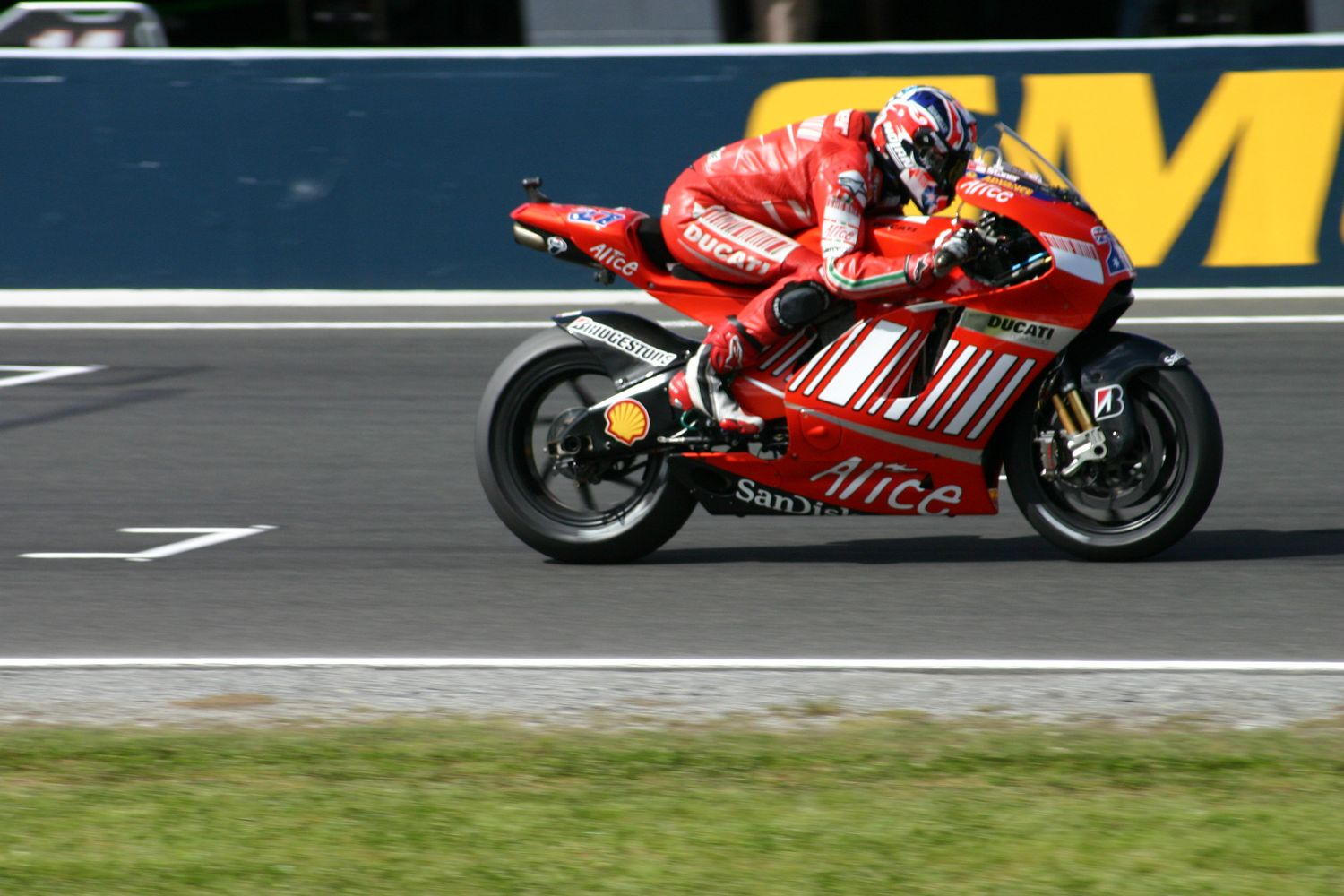
Casey Stoner, riding his Ducati at the MotoGP race. He won the race, the first time an Australian had won his home race since Mick Doohan's victory in 1998.

As lap thirteen begins, Hayden is still angry as he walks off of the gravel trap. Hayden's retirement moves Pedrosa up to third, Melandri to fourth, Capirossi to fifth and Barros to sixth place. Stoner has created a gap that's over 4 seconds to Rossi as well. Further back, Capirossi's Bridgestone-shod Ducati had caught Melandri at a rapid pace.

On lap fourteen, Melandri's Bridgestone-shod Gresini Honda of started to close the gap slightly to Pedrosa's Michelin-shod Repsol Honda, with Capirossi doing likewise to Melandri. Stoner extended his lead to around +4.7 seconds over Rossi at the front.

Lap fifteen and Melandri is now all over the back of Pedrosa. Melandri wanted to overtake him going up the hill at Lukey Heights, but made a mistake and ran wide, almost gifting Capirossi fourth position.

On lap sixteen, Capirossi was harassing Melandri for the fourth spot. Chaz Davies meanwhile had reached the pits after retiring a few laps earlier. Rossi now started to lose ground to Pedrosa as well, the Spaniard catching up to the Italian's rear wheel.

Going into lap seventeen, Capirossi made his move at the start/finish straight. Using the superior top speed of his Ducati, he goes side by side and outbreaks Melandri going into Doohan Corner for third place. Pedrosa meanwhile went side by side on the outside with Rossi into said corner and overtook him at the next one – the Southern Loop – to take second from him. He then had a major wobble with his front wheel before going into the Stoner Corner, but lost no ground to anyone.

Lap eighteen and Stoner's lead over Pedrosa is +6.716 seconds. Rossi refuses to let him run away with second and hangs on and Capirossi is slowly catching up with the two. Pedrosa then went wide at the Honda Corner, almost allowing Rossi to pass him. Rossi then harasses Pedrosa for the remainder of the lap.

As lap nineteen begins, Capirossi once again uses his Ducati's superior top speed to blast past the Yamaha of Rossi and moves up into third position before the Doohan Corner. He then surprises Pedrosa by moving up his inside at the Southern Loop to take two positions in two corners – making full use of his superior Bridgestone tyres – and make it a Ducati 1–2, much to the delight of the Ducati pit box. Pedrosa – now suffering badly with the tyres – is also overtaken by Rossi at the Honda Corner to take the bottom step of the podium.

Lap twenty and there's only seven laps to go. Stoner is still comfortably ahead with a +7.420 lead over Capirossi. Rossi meanwhile almost gets overtaken by Pedrosa at the start/finish straight, but he denies Pedrosa going into the Doohan Corner. Further back, Melandri – who has been suffering with his tyres since his mistake – has been caught by the Pramac Ducati of Barros, and gets passed by him at Turn 11.

On lap twenty-one, no overtakes happened at the front, though Rossi was still trying to find a way past Capirossi.

Lap twenty-two and the midfield runners Chris Vermeulen and Anthony West battle for ninth position. West passes Vermeulen going into the Doohan Corner. Behind them are also Colin Edwards and Carlos Checa, fighting for tenth place.

Lap twenty-three and Capirossi now starts to open up a gap to Rossi. No overtakes happened at the front.

On lap twenty-four, no overtakes happened.

Lap twentyfive – the penultimate lap – and Stoner has lost some margin, shrinking his gap to +6.869 seconds to Capirossi, who himself has now pulled a +1.783 second gap back to Rossi down in third position. Rossi himself has also pulled a significant gap of +1.679 seconds back to Pedrosa.

The final lap – lap twentysix – has begun and the top four is as follows: Stoner, Capirossi, Rossi and Pedrosa. Further back, Kawasaki rider Randy de Puniet and Suzuki rider John Hopkins had passed Melandri for sixth and seventh place. Vermeulen also passed Melandri for eighth not much later. Stoner had no problems on this lap and crossed it to win his ninth race of the season. Capirossi and Rossi crossed the line in second and third, Pedrosa in fourth and Barros fifth – his third highest position of the season. De Puniet and Hopkins finished sixth and seventh and Vermeulen and Edwards eighth and ninth.

On the parade lap back to parc fermé, Stoner waved the Australian flag, while Capirossi waved a small Italian flag. Supporters in the grandstands applauded and waved Australian and number 27 flags. Hopkins and Vermeulen congratulated Stoner after the race.

Rossi arrives to parc fermé and hugs one of his crewmembers. Stoner also arrives and talks to his delighted crewmembers, as does a visibly tired Capirossi. The Ducati teammates hug each other as well. The three then talk to the press before the podium ceremony.

The riders walk up to the podium, with Rossi the first to emerge, followed by Capirossi and Stoner. They take their places on their respective podium slots and the important figures hand out the trophies to the third, second and first place riders. The Australian national anthem plays for Stoner and the trio sprays the champagne.

== MotoGP classification ==
Pos.	No.	Rider	Team	Manufacturer	Laps	Time/Retired	Grid	Points
1	27	(Australia) Casey Stoner	Ducati Marlboro Team	Ducati	27	41:12.244	3	25
2	65	(Italy) Loris Capirossi	Ducati Marlboro Team	Ducati	27	+6.763	5	20
3	46	(Italy) Valentino Rossi	Fiat Yamaha Team	Yamaha	27	+10.038	2	16
4	26	(Spain) Dani Pedrosa	Repsol Honda Team	Honda	27	+11.663	1	13
5	4	(Brazil) Alex Barros	Pramac d'Antin	Ducati	27	+19.475	7	11
6	14	(France) Randy de Puniet	Kawasaki Racing Team	Kawasaki	27	+27.313	6	10
7	21	(United States) John Hopkins	Rizla Suzuki MotoGP	Suzuki	27	+29.243	14	9
8	71	(Australia) Chris Vermeulen	Rizla Suzuki MotoGP	Suzuki	27	+34.833	16	8
9	5	(United States) Colin Edwards	Fiat Yamaha Team	Yamaha	27	+35.073	11	7
10	33	(Italy) Marco Melandri	Honda Gresini	Honda	27	+36.971	12	6
11	7	(Spain) Carlos Checa	Honda LCR	Honda	27	+37.721	13	5
12	13	(Australia) Anthony West	Kawasaki Racing Team	Kawasaki	27	+38.426	10	4
13	56	(Japan) Shinya Nakano	Konica Minolta Honda	Honda	27	+47.430	8	3
14	50	(France) Sylvain Guintoli	Dunlop Yamaha Tech 3	Yamaha	27	+54.324	9	2
15	24	(Spain) Toni Elías	Honda Gresini	Honda	27	+1:10.471	18	1
16	6	(Japan) Makoto Tamada	Dunlop Yamaha Tech 3	Yamaha	27	+1:12.904	15	
17	80	(United States) Kurtis Roberts	Team Roberts	KR212V	27	+1:13.020	19	
Ret	1	(United States) Nicky Hayden	Repsol Honda Team	Honda	12	Retirement	4	
Ret	57	(United Kingdom) Chaz Davies	Pramac d'Antin	Ducati	12	Retirement	17	

== 250 cc classification ==
Pos.	No.	Rider	Manufacturer	Laps	Time/Retired	Grid	Points
1	1	(Spain) Jorge Lorenzo	Aprilia	25	39:25.727	1	25
2	19	(Spain) Álvaro Bautista	Aprilia	25	+19.634	3	20
3	34	(Italy) Andrea Dovizioso	Honda	25	+19.724	7	16
4	4	(Japan) Hiroshi Aoyama	KTM	25	+19.797	6	13
5	12	(Switzerland) Thomas Lüthi	Aprilia	25	+20.066	8	11
6	60	(Spain) Julián Simón	Honda	25	+21.045	9	10
7	58	(Italy) Marco Simoncelli	Gilera	25	+32.960	5	9
8	73	(Japan) Shuhei Aoyama	Honda	25	+33.043	10	8
9	3	(San Marino) Alex de Angelis	Aprilia	25	+33.051	4	7
10	55	(Japan) Yuki Takahashi	Honda	25	+44.814	12	6
11	15	(Italy) Roberto Locatelli	Gilera	25	+48.733	13	5
12	16	(France) Jules Cluzel	Aprilia	25	+54.010	15	4
13	17	(Czech Republic) Karel Abraham	Aprilia	25	+1:03.218	21	3
14	41	(Spain) Aleix Espargaró	Aprilia	25	+1:09.368	14	2
15	28	(Germany) Dirk Heidolf	Aprilia	25	+1:17.807	17	1
16	50	(Republic of Ireland) Eugene Laverty	Honda	25	+1:21.239	24	
17	32	(Italy) Fabrizio Lai	Aprilia	25	+1:31.245	16	
18	11	(Japan) Taro Sekiguchi	Aprilia	25	+1:33.575	22	
19	8	(Thailand) Ratthapark Wilairot	Honda	25	+1:33.916	23	
20	21	(Italy) Federico Sandi	Aprilia	24	+1 lap	25	
Ret	25	(Italy) Alex Baldolini	Aprilia	18	Retirement	19	
Ret	10	(Hungary) Imre Tóth	Aprilia	5	Retirement	18	
Ret	7	(Spain) Efrén Vázquez	Aprilia	3	Accident	20	
Ret	36	(Finland) Mika Kallio	KTM	1	Accident	11	
Ret	89	(China) Ho Wan Chow	Aprilia	1	Retirement	26	
Ret	80	(Spain) Héctor Barberá	Aprilia	0	Retirement	2	
OFFICIAL 250cc REPORT

== 125 cc classification ==
Pos.	No.	Rider	Manufacturer	Laps	Time/Retired	Grid	Points
1	52	(Czech Republic) Lukáš Pešek	Derbi	23	38:03.020	3	25
2	6	(Spain) Joan Olivé	Aprilia	23	+0.090	8	20
3	55	(Spain) Héctor Faubel	Aprilia	23	+0.190	6	16
4	24	(Italy) Simone Corsi	Aprilia	23	+0.405	5	13
5	12	(Spain) Esteve Rabat	Honda	23	+0.915	11	11
6	71	(Japan) Tomoyoshi Koyama	KTM	23	+1.315	4	10
7	75	(Italy) Mattia Pasini	Aprilia	23	+1.316	1	9
8	14	(Hungary) Gábor Talmácsi	Aprilia	23	+1.371	9	8
9	33	(Spain) Sergio Gadea	Aprilia	23	+1.457	7	7
10	11	(Germany) Sandro Cortese	Aprilia	23	+14.652	10	6
11	44	(Spain) Pol Espargaró	Aprilia	23	+21.745	17	5
12	34	(Switzerland) Randy Krummenacher	KTM	23	+22.687	20	4
13	18	(Spain) Nicolás Terol	Derbi	23	+26.491	19	3
14	63	(France) Mike Di Meglio	Honda	23	+26.563	12	2
15	51	(United States) Stevie Bonsey	KTM	23	+37.823	18	1
16	38	(United Kingdom) Bradley Smith	Honda	23	+37.981	13	
17	37	(Netherlands) Joey Litjens	Honda	23	+40.406	23	
18	8	(Italy) Lorenzo Zanetti	Aprilia	23	+40.453	14	
19	77	(Switzerland) Dominique Aegerter	Aprilia	23	+44.271	28	
20	29	(Italy) Andrea Iannone	Aprilia	23	+44.831	22	
21	53	(Italy) Simone Grotzkyj	Aprilia	23	+51.482	24	
22	60	(Austria) Michael Ranseder	Derbi	23	+1:01.153	15	
23	20	(Italy) Roberto Tamburini	Aprilia	23	+1:03.614	29	
24	13	(Italy) Dino Lombardi	Honda	23	+1:18.524	27	
25	79	(Italy) Ferruccio Lamborghini	Aprilia	23	+1:37.558	30	
26	68	(Australia) Glenn Scott	Aprilia	22	+1 lap	31	
Ret	17	(Germany) Stefan Bradl	Aprilia	19	Retirement	26	
Ret	22	(Spain) Pablo Nieto	Aprilia	17	Retirement	16	
Ret	7	(France) Alexis Masbou	Honda	15	Accident	21	
Ret	99	(United Kingdom) Danny Webb	Honda	13	Accident	25	
Ret	35	(Italy) Raffaele De Rosa	Aprilia	5	Retirement	2	
DNQ	70	(Australia) Blake Leigh-Smith	Honda		Did not qualify		
DNQ	96	(Australia) Rhys Moller	Honda		Did not qualify		
DNQ	73	(Australia) Jackson Leigh-Smith	Honda		Did not qualify		
DNQ	95	(Romania) Robert Mureșan	Derbi		Did not qualify		
OFFICIAL 125cc REPORT

== Championship standings after the race (MotoGP) ==
Below are the standings for the top five riders and constructors after round sixteen has concluded.

Riders' Championship standings

Pos.	Rider	Points
1	(Australia) Casey Stoner	322
2	(Italy) Valentino Rossi	230
3	(Spain) Dani Pedrosa	201
4	(United States) John Hopkins	165
5	(Australia) Chris Vermeulen	160

Constructors' Championship standings

Pos.	Constructor	Points
1	(Italy) Ducati	349
2	(Japan) Honda	268
3	(Japan) Yamaha	267
4	(Japan) Suzuki	216
5	(Japan) Kawasaki	124

- Note: Only the top five positions are included for both sets of standings.

Previous race: 2007 Japanese Grand Prix	FIM Grand Prix World Championship; 2007 season	Next race: 2007 Malaysian Grand Prix
Previous race: 2006 Australian Grand Prix	Australian motorcycle Grand Prix	Next race: 2008 Australian Grand Prix
