= 2007 San Marino and Rimini Riviera motorcycle Grand Prix =

2007 Motorcycle race

2007 San Marino and Rimini Riviera Grand Prix
Race details
- Race 13 of 18 races in the 2007 Grand Prix motorcycle racing season
- Date: 2 September 2007
- Official name: Gran Premio Cinzano di San Marino e Della Riviera di Rimini
- Location: Misano World Circuit
- Course: Permanent racing facility; 4.180 km (2.597 mi)

MotoGP
Pole position
- Rider: (Australia) Casey Stoner
- Time: 1:33.918
Fastest lap
- Rider: (Australia) Casey Stoner
- Time: 1:34.649
Podium
- First: (Australia) Casey Stoner
- Second: (Australia) Chris Vermeulen
- Third: (United States) John Hopkins

250cc
Pole position
- Rider: (Spain) Jorge Lorenzo
- Time: 1:38.395
Fastest lap
- Rider: (Japan) Hiroshi Aoyama
- Time: 1:38.074
Podium
- First: (Spain) Jorge Lorenzo
- Second: (Japan) Hiroshi Aoyama
- Third: (Spain) Héctor Barberá

125cc
Pole position
- Rider: (Czech Republic) Lukáš Pešek
- Time: 1:43.370
Fastest lap
- Rider: (Italy) Mattia Pasini
- Time: 1:42.811
Podium
- First: (Italy) Mattia Pasini
- Second: (Hungary) Gábor Talmácsi
- Third: (Japan) Tomoyoshi Koyama

The 2007 San Marino and Rimini Riviera motorcycle Grand Prix was the thirteenth round of the 2007 MotoGP Championship. It took place on the weekend of 31 August – 2 September 2007 at the Misano World Circuit in Misano Adriatico.

As of 2025, this was the last race where no European rider finished the race on the podium; two Oceanian riders and an American rider filled the three podium places for this race.

== MotoGP classification ==
Pos.	No.	Rider	Team	Manufacturer	Laps	Time/Retired	Grid	Points
1	27	(Australia) Casey Stoner	Ducati Marlboro Team	Ducati	28	44:34.720	1	25
2	71	(Australia) Chris Vermeulen	Rizla Suzuki MotoGP	Suzuki	28	+4.851	8	20
3	21	(United States) John Hopkins	Rizla Suzuki MotoGP	Suzuki	28	+16.002	5	16
4	33	(Italy) Marco Melandri	Honda Gresini	Honda	28	+22.737	12	13
5	65	(Italy) Loris Capirossi	Ducati Marlboro Team	Ducati	28	+24.787	13	11
6	7	(Spain) Carlos Checa	Honda LCR	Honda	28	+34.986	7	10
7	24	(Spain) Toni Elías	Honda Gresini	Honda	28	+40.896	15	9
8	13	(Australia) Anthony West	Kawasaki Racing Team	Kawasaki	28	+41.774	10	8
9	5	(United States) Colin Edwards	Fiat Yamaha Team	Yamaha	28	+47.146	9	7
10	56	(Japan) Shinya Nakano	Konica Minolta Honda	Honda	28	+48.808	14	6
11	66	(Germany) Alex Hofmann	Pramac d'Antin	Ducati	28	+49.299	19	5
12	50	(France) Sylvain Guintoli	Dunlop Yamaha Tech 3	Yamaha	28	+1:09.176	11	4
13	1	(United States) Nicky Hayden	Repsol Honda Team	Honda	28	+1:20.424	3	3
14	6	(Japan) Makoto Tamada	Dunlop Yamaha Tech 3	Yamaha	28	+1:34.223	16	2
15	80	(United States) Kurtis Roberts	Team Roberts	KR212V	27	+1 lap	18	1
Ret	4	(Brazil) Alex Barros	Pramac d'Antin	Ducati	15	Retirement	17	
Ret	46	(Italy) Valentino Rossi	Fiat Yamaha Team	Yamaha	5	Retirement	2	
Ret	14	(France) Randy de Puniet	Kawasaki Racing Team	Kawasaki	0	Accident	4	
Ret	26	(Spain) Dani Pedrosa	Repsol Honda Team	Honda	0	Accident	6	

== 250 cc classification ==
Pos.	No.	Rider	Manufacturer	Laps	Time/Retired	Grid	Points
1	1	(Spain) Jorge Lorenzo	Aprilia	26	42:54.427	1	25
2	4	(Japan) Hiroshi Aoyama	KTM	26	+3.578	4	20
3	80	(Spain) Héctor Barberá	Aprilia	26	+7.041	3	16
4	12	(Switzerland) Thomas Lüthi	Aprilia	26	+7.213	7	13
5	3	(San Marino) Alex de Angelis	Aprilia	26	+7.664	10	11
6	73	(Japan) Shuhei Aoyama	Honda	26	+36.234	11	10
7	15	(Italy) Roberto Locatelli	Gilera	26	+36.918	14	9
8	19	(Spain) Álvaro Bautista	Aprilia	26	+36.936	6	8
9	55	(Japan) Yuki Takahashi	Honda	26	+37.142	12	7
10	60	(Spain) Julián Simón	Honda	26	+40.293	8	6
11	16	(France) Jules Cluzel	Aprilia	26	+51.720	17	5
12	41	(Spain) Aleix Espargaró	Aprilia	26	+56.620	13	4
13	8	(Thailand) Ratthapark Wilairot	Honda	26	+1:00.060	16	3
14	17	(Czech Republic) Karel Abraham	Aprilia	26	+1:01.500	20	2
15	50	(Republic of Ireland) Eugene Laverty	Honda	26	+1:09.950	18	1
16	7	(Spain) Efrén Vázquez	Aprilia	26	+1:10.059	21	
17	10	(Hungary) Imre Tóth	Aprilia	25	+1 lap	24	
18	64	(Italy) Omar Menghi	Aprilia	25	+1 lap	25	
Ret	36	(Finland) Mika Kallio	KTM	23	Retirement	5	
Ret	25	(Italy) Alex Baldolini	Aprilia	19	Retirement	22	
Ret	34	(Italy) Andrea Dovizioso	Honda	19	Retirement	2	
Ret	45	(United Kingdom) Dan Linfoot	Aprilia	17	Retirement	23	
Ret	28	(Germany) Dirk Heidolf	Aprilia	13	Retirement	19	
Ret	32	(Italy) Fabrizio Lai	Aprilia	4	Retirement	15	
Ret	58	(Italy) Marco Simoncelli	Gilera	3	Retirement	9	
OFFICIAL 250cc REPORT

== 125 cc classification ==
Pos.	No.	Rider	Manufacturer	Laps	Time/Retired	Grid	Points
1	75	(Italy) Mattia Pasini	Aprilia	23	39:47.944	3	25
2	14	(Hungary) Gábor Talmácsi	Aprilia	23	+4.774	4	20
3	71	(Japan) Tomoyoshi Koyama	KTM	23	+8.576	6	16
4	33	(Spain) Sergio Gadea	Aprilia	23	+15.819	10	13
5	44	(Spain) Pol Espargaró	Aprilia	23	+23.972	14	11
6	34	(Switzerland) Randy Krummenacher	KTM	23	+25.159	16	10
7	17	(Germany) Stefan Bradl	Aprilia	23	+25.391	17	9
8	38	(United Kingdom) Bradley Smith	Honda	23	+25.513	9	8
9	35	(Italy) Raffaele De Rosa	Aprilia	23	+25.994	13	7
10	60	(Austria) Michael Ranseder	Derbi	23	+26.239	12	6
11	12	(Spain) Esteve Rabat	Honda	23	+26.693	7	5
12	6	(Spain) Joan Olivé	Aprilia	23	+26.972	15	4
13	63	(France) Mike Di Meglio	Honda	23	+27.493	11	3
14	29	(Italy) Andrea Iannone	Aprilia	23	+32.894	22	2
15	11	(Germany) Sandro Cortese	Aprilia	23	+39.305	8	1
16	8	(Italy) Lorenzo Zanetti	Aprilia	23	+40.035	20	
17	55	(Spain) Héctor Faubel	Aprilia	23	+40.125	2	
18	18	(Spain) Nicolás Terol	Derbi	23	+40.157	18	
19	20	(Italy) Roberto Tamburini	Aprilia	23	+48.291	21	
20	52	(Czech Republic) Lukáš Pešek	Derbi	23	+49.621	1	
21	7	(France) Alexis Masbou	Honda	23	+50.496	27	
22	42	(Italy) Simone Sancioni	Aprilia	23	+57.519	23	
23	77	(Switzerland) Dominique Aegerter	Aprilia	23	+57.666	25	
24	79	(Italy) Ferruccio Lamborghini	Aprilia	23	+59.680	37	
25	87	(Italy) Roberto Lacalendola	Aprilia	23	+1:05.109	30	
26	51	(United States) Stevie Bonsey	KTM	23	+1:05.276	29	
27	37	(Netherlands) Joey Litjens	Honda	23	+1:08.757	31	
28	53	(Italy) Simone Grotzkyj	Aprilia	23	+1:10.395	24	
29	95	(Romania) Robert Mureșan	Derbi	23	+1:18.572	36	
30	99	(United Kingdom) Danny Webb	Honda	23	+1:20.963	33	
31	56	(Netherlands) Hugo van den Berg	Aprilia	23	+1:21.676	35	
32	80	(Italy) Federico Biaggi	Friba	23	+1:54.228	32	
Ret	24	(Italy) Simone Corsi	Aprilia	21	Accident	5	
Ret	27	(Italy) Stefano Bianco	Aprilia	16	Retirement	19	
Ret	13	(Italy) Dino Lombardi	Honda	11	Retirement	34	
Ret	22	(Spain) Pablo Nieto	Aprilia	9	Retirement	28	
Ret	15	(Italy) Federico Sandi	Aprilia	0	Accident	26	
OFFICIAL 125cc REPORT

== Championship standings after the race (MotoGP) ==
Below are the standings for the top five riders and constructors after round thirteen has concluded.

Riders' Championship standings

Pos.	Rider	Points
1	(Australia) Casey Stoner	271
2	(Italy) Valentino Rossi	186
3	(Spain) Dani Pedrosa	168
4	(Australia) Chris Vermeulen	144
5	(United States) John Hopkins	140

Constructors' Championship standings

Pos.	Constructor	Points
1	(Italy) Ducati	283
2	(Japan) Honda	219
3	(Japan) Yamaha	213
4	(Japan) Suzuki	191
5	(Japan) Kawasaki	90

- Note: Only the top five positions are included for both sets of standings.

Previous race: 2007 Czech Republic Grand Prix	FIM Grand Prix World Championship; 2007 season	Next race: 2007 Portuguese Grand Prix
Previous race: 1993 San Marino Grand Prix	San Marino and Rimini Riviera motorcycle Grand Prix	Next race: 2008 San Marino Grand Prix
