= 2007 Spanish motorcycle Grand Prix =

(Spain) 2007 Spanish Grand Prix
Race details
- Race 2 of 18 races in the 2007 Grand Prix motorcycle racing season
- Date: 25 March 2007
- Official name: Gran Premio bwin.com de España
- Location: Circuito de Jerez
- Course: Permanent racing facility; 4.423 km (2.748 mi)

MotoGP
Pole position
- Rider: (Spain) Dani Pedrosa
- Time: 1:39.402
Fastest lap
- Rider: (Italy) Valentino Rossi
- Time: 1:40.905
Podium
- First: (Italy) Valentino Rossi
- Second: (Spain) Dani Pedrosa
- Third: (United States) Colin Edwards

250cc
Pole position
- Rider: (Spain) Jorge Lorenzo
- Time: 1:43.099
Fastest lap
- Rider: (San Marino) Alex de Angelis
- Time: 1:44.295
Podium
- First: (Spain) Jorge Lorenzo
- Second: (Spain) Álvaro Bautista
- Third: (Italy) Andrea Dovizioso

125cc
Pole position
- Rider: (Italy) Mattia Pasini
- Time: 1:47.245
Fastest lap
- Rider: (Hungary) Gábor Talmácsi
- Time: 1:47.976
Podium
- First: (Hungary) Gábor Talmácsi
- Second: (Czech Republic) Lukáš Pešek
- Third: (Spain) Héctor Faubel

The 2007 Spanish motorcycle Grand Prix was the second round of the 2007 MotoGP championship. It took place on the weekend of 23–25 March 2007 at the Circuito de Jerez.

== MotoGP classification ==
Pos.	No.	Rider	Team	Manufacturer	Laps	Time/Retired	Grid	Points
1	46	(Italy) Valentino Rossi	Fiat Yamaha Team	Yamaha	27	45:53.340	2	25
2	26	(Spain) Dani Pedrosa	Repsol Honda Team	Honda	27	+1.246	1	20
3	5	(United States) Colin Edwards	Fiat Yamaha Team	Yamaha	27	+2.701	4	16
4	24	(Spain) Toni Elías	Honda Gresini	Honda	27	+4.351	8	13
5	27	(Australia) Casey Stoner	Ducati Marlboro Team	Ducati	27	+4.993	5	11
6	7	(Spain) Carlos Checa	Honda LCR	Honda	27	+10.000	3	10
7	1	(United States) Nicky Hayden	Repsol Honda Team	Honda	27	+14.146	11	9
8	33	(Italy) Marco Melandri	Honda Gresini	Honda	27	+19.969	9	8
9	71	(Australia) Chris Vermeulen	Rizla Suzuki MotoGP	Suzuki	27	+24.786	14	7
10	56	(Japan) Shinya Nakano	Konica Minolta Honda	Honda	27	+24.955	7	6
11	4	(Brazil) Alex Barros	Pramac d'Antin	Ducati	27	+25.008	13	5
12	65	(Italy) Loris Capirossi	Ducati Marlboro Team	Ducati	27	+25.852	15	4
13	14	(France) Randy de Puniet	Kawasaki Racing Team	Kawasaki	27	+26.445	12	3
14	6	(Japan) Makoto Tamada	Dunlop Yamaha Tech 3	Yamaha	27	+36.653	17	2
15	50	(France) Sylvain Guintoli	Dunlop Yamaha Tech 3	Yamaha	27	+36.744	20	1
16	10	(United States) Kenny Roberts Jr.	Team Roberts	KR212V	27	+48.911	10	
17	64	(Japan) Kousuke Akiyoshi	Rizla Suzuki MotoGP	Suzuki	27	+50.784	19	
18	19	(France) Olivier Jacque	Kawasaki Racing Team	Kawasaki	27	+1:00.901	16	
19	21	(United States) John Hopkins	Rizla Suzuki MotoGP	Suzuki	27	+1:03.371	6	
DSQ	66	(Germany) Alex Hofmann	Pramac d'Antin	Ducati	4	Black flag	18	

== 250 cc classification ==
Pos.	No.	Rider	Manufacturer	Laps	Time/Retired	Grid	Points
1	1	(Spain) Jorge Lorenzo	Aprilia	26	45:35.846	1	25
2	19	(Spain) Álvaro Bautista	Aprilia	26	+0.218	5	20
3	34	(Italy) Andrea Dovizioso	Honda	26	+0.478	4	16
4	3	(San Marino) Alex de Angelis	Aprilia	26	+8.156	12	13
5	6	(Spain) Alex Debón	Aprilia	26	+14.747	8	11
6	4	(Japan) Hiroshi Aoyama	KTM	26	+15.045	13	10
7	73	(Japan) Shuhei Aoyama	Honda	26	+17.918	7	9
8	55	(Japan) Yuki Takahashi	Honda	26	+28.438	14	8
9	14	(Australia) Anthony West	Aprilia	26	+39.435	15	7
10	28	(Germany) Dirk Heidolf	Aprilia	26	+1:02.689	17	6
11	32	(Italy) Fabrizio Lai	Aprilia	26	+1:06.813	11	5
12	8	(Thailand) Ratthapark Wilairot	Honda	26	+1:07.166	18	4
13	25	(Italy) Alex Baldolini	Aprilia	26	+1:07.371	22	3
14	50	(Republic of Ireland) Eugene Laverty	Honda	26	+1:11.793	24	2
15	17	(Czech Republic) Karel Abraham	Aprilia	26	+1:13.898	21	1
16	16	(France) Jules Cluzel	Aprilia	26	+1:32.684	25	
17	44	(Japan) Taro Sekiguchi	Aprilia	26	+1:33.041	23	
18	10	(Hungary) Imre Tóth	Aprilia	25	+1 lap	20	
Ret	36	(Finland) Mika Kallio	KTM	18	Retirement	10	
Ret	80	(Spain) Héctor Barberá	Aprilia	15	Accident	2	
Ret	60	(Spain) Julián Simón	Honda	12	Accident	3	
Ret	41	(Spain) Aleix Espargaró	Aprilia	10	Retirement	16	
Ret	9	(Spain) Arturo Tizón	Aprilia	9	Retirement	26	
Ret	12	(Switzerland) Thomas Lüthi	Aprilia	6	Retirement	9	
Ret	31	(Spain) Álvaro Molina	Aprilia	2	Accident	19	
Ret	53	(Spain) Santiago Barragán	Honda	0	Accident	27	
Ret	58	(Italy) Marco Simoncelli	Gilera	0	Accident	6	
DNS	15	(Italy) Roberto Locatelli	Gilera		Did not start		
OFFICIAL 250cc REPORT

== 125 cc classification ==
Pos.	No.	Rider	Manufacturer	Laps	Time/Retired	Grid	Points
1	14	(Hungary) Gábor Talmácsi	Aprilia	23	41:52.149	2	25
2	52	(Czech Republic) Lukáš Pešek	Derbi	23	+0.014	3	20
3	55	(Spain) Héctor Faubel	Aprilia	23	+5.720	5	16
4	44	(Spain) Pol Espargaró	Aprilia	23	+6.489	7	13
5	33	(Spain) Sergio Gadea	Aprilia	23	+6.867	4	11
6	22	(Spain) Pablo Nieto	Aprilia	23	+9.219	9	10
7	11	(Germany) Sandro Cortese	Aprilia	23	+19.078	10	9
8	6	(Spain) Joan Olivé	Aprilia	23	+19.133	14	8
9	60	(Austria) Michael Ranseder	Derbi	23	+19.664	13	7
10	8	(Italy) Lorenzo Zanetti	Aprilia	23	+28.434	17	6
11	27	(Italy) Stefano Bianco	Aprilia	23	+28.815	21	5
12	29	(Italy) Andrea Iannone	Aprilia	23	+28.816	15	4
13	51	(United States) Stevie Bonsey	KTM	23	+43.699	25	3
14	18	(Spain) Nicolás Terol	Derbi	23	+46.436	22	2
15	53	(Italy) Simone Grotzkyj	Aprilia	23	+48.081	24	1
16	30	(Spain) Pere Tutusaus	Aprilia	23	+48.579	18	
17	34	(Switzerland) Randy Krummenacher	KTM	23	+51.253	23	
18	95	(Romania) Robert Mureșan	Derbi	23	+52.160	28	
19	77	(Switzerland) Dominique Aegerter	Aprilia	23	+1:11.825	32	
20	56	(Netherlands) Hugo van den Berg	Aprilia	23	+1:13.134	26	
21	37	(Netherlands) Joey Litjens	Honda	23	+1:20.289	30	
22	76	(Spain) Iván Maestro	Aprilia	23	+1:23.752	27	
23	13	(Italy) Dino Lombardi	Honda	23	+1:28.888	31	
24	78	(Spain) Daniel Sáez	Aprilia	23	+1:31.676	33	
25	20	(Italy) Roberto Tamburini	Aprilia	23	+1:45.176	34	
26	38	(United Kingdom) Bradley Smith	Honda	23	+1:45.208	11	
Ret	71	(Japan) Tomoyoshi Koyama	KTM	19	Retirement	6	
Ret	15	(Italy) Federico Sandi	Aprilia	19	Accident	20	
Ret	99	(United Kingdom) Danny Webb	Honda	16	Retirement	29	
Ret	7	(France) Alexis Masbou	Honda	11	Accident	16	
Ret	35	(Italy) Raffaele De Rosa	Aprilia	3	Retirement	12	
Ret	24	(Italy) Simone Corsi	Aprilia	2	Accident	8	
Ret	75	(Italy) Mattia Pasini	Aprilia	1	Retirement	1	
Ret	12	(Spain) Esteve Rabat	Honda	0	Accident	19	
DNS	63	(France) Mike Di Meglio	Honda		Did not start		
OFFICIAL 125cc REPORT

== Championship standings after the race (MotoGP) ==
Below are the standings for the top five riders and constructors after round two has concluded.

Riders' Championship standings

Pos.	Rider	Points
1	(Italy) Valentino Rossi	45
2	(Australia) Casey Stoner	36
3	(Spain) Dani Pedrosa	36
4	(United States) Colin Edwards	26
5	(Italy) Marco Melandri	19

Constructors' Championship standings

Pos.	Constructor	Points
1	(Japan) Yamaha	45
2	(Italy) Ducati	36
3	(Japan) Honda	36
4	(Japan) Suzuki	20
5	(Japan) Kawasaki	7

- Note: Only the top five positions are included for both sets of standings.

Previous race: 2007 Qatar Grand Prix	FIM Grand Prix World Championship; 2007 season	Next race: 2007 Turkish Grand Prix
Previous race: 2006 Spanish Grand Prix	Spanish motorcycle Grand Prix	Next race: 2008 Spanish Grand Prix
