= 2007 Portuguese motorcycle Grand Prix =

(Portugal) 2007 Portuguese Grand Prix
Race details
- Race 14 of 18 races in the 2007 Grand Prix motorcycle racing season
- Date: 16 September 2007
- Official name: bwin.com Grande Prémio de Portugal
- Location: Autódromo do Estoril
- Course: Permanent racing facility; 4.182 km (2.599 mi)

MotoGP
Pole position
- Rider: (United States) Nicky Hayden
- Time: 1:36.301
Fastest lap
- Rider: (United States) Nicky Hayden
- Time: 1:37.493
Podium
- First: (Italy) Valentino Rossi
- Second: (Spain) Dani Pedrosa
- Third: (Australia) Casey Stoner

250cc
Pole position
- Rider: (Italy) Andrea Dovizioso
- Time: 1:40.355
Fastest lap
- Rider: (Spain) Álvaro Bautista
- Time: 1:40.521
Podium
- First: (Spain) Álvaro Bautista
- Second: (Italy) Andrea Dovizioso
- Third: (Spain) Jorge Lorenzo

125cc
Pole position
- Rider: (Italy) Mattia Pasini
- Time: 1:44.675
Fastest lap
- Rider: (Hungary) Gábor Talmácsi
- Time: 1:45.027
Podium
- First: (Spain) Héctor Faubel
- Second: (Hungary) Gábor Talmácsi
- Third: (Spain) Pol Espargaró

The 2007 Portuguese motorcycle Grand Prix was the fourteenth round of the 2007 MotoGP Championship. It took place on the weekend of 14–16 September 2007 at the Autódromo do Estoril located in Estoril, Portugal.

== MotoGP classification ==
Pos.	No.	Rider	Team	Manufacturer	Laps	Time/Retired	Grid	Points
1	46	(Italy) Valentino Rossi	Fiat Yamaha Team	Yamaha	28	45:49.911	3	25
2	26	(Spain) Dani Pedrosa	Repsol Honda Team	Honda	28	+0.175	5	20
3	27	(Australia) Casey Stoner	Ducati Marlboro Team	Ducati	28	+1.477	2	16
4	1	(United States) Nicky Hayden	Repsol Honda Team	Honda	28	+12.951	1	13
5	33	(Italy) Marco Melandri	Honda Gresini	Honda	28	+17.343	7	11
6	21	(United States) John Hopkins	Rizla Suzuki MotoGP	Suzuki	28	+18.857	10	10
7	7	(Spain) Carlos Checa	Honda LCR	Honda	28	+31.524	11	9
8	24	(Spain) Toni Elías	Honda Gresini	Honda	28	+40.535	9	8
9	65	(Italy) Loris Capirossi	Ducati Marlboro Team	Ducati	28	+43.107	15	7
10	5	(United States) Colin Edwards	Fiat Yamaha Team	Yamaha	28	+44.674	6	6
11	56	(Japan) Shinya Nakano	Konica Minolta Honda	Honda	28	+45.403	13	5
12	13	(Australia) Anthony West	Kawasaki Racing Team	Kawasaki	28	+54.562	16	4
13	71	(Australia) Chris Vermeulen	Rizla Suzuki MotoGP	Suzuki	28	+1:00.002	12	3
14	50	(France) Sylvain Guintoli	Dunlop Yamaha Tech 3	Yamaha	27	+1 lap	8	2
Ret	6	(Japan) Makoto Tamada	Dunlop Yamaha Tech 3	Yamaha	23	Accident	4	
Ret	4	(Brazil) Alex Barros	Pramac d'Antin	Ducati	22	Retirement	14	
Ret	14	(France) Randy de Puniet	Kawasaki Racing Team	Kawasaki	19	Retirement	18	
Ret	66	(Germany) Alex Hofmann	Pramac d'Antin	Ducati	11	Retirement	17	
Ret	80	(United States) Kurtis Roberts	Team Roberts	KR122V	2	Retirement	19	

== 250 cc classification ==
Pos.	No.	Rider	Manufacturer	Laps	Time/Retired	Grid	Points
1	19	(Spain) Álvaro Bautista	Aprilia	26	43:56.458	6	25
2	34	(Italy) Andrea Dovizioso	Honda	26	+4.367	1	20
3	1	(Spain) Jorge Lorenzo	Aprilia	26	+6.148	2	16
4	12	(Switzerland) Thomas Lüthi	Aprilia	26	+12.685	10	13
5	80	(Spain) Héctor Barberá	Aprilia	26	+13.411	3	11
6	3	(San Marino) Alex de Angelis	Aprilia	26	+13.440	8	10
7	58	(Italy) Marco Simoncelli	Gilera	26	+30.322	11	9
8	60	(Spain) Julián Simón	Honda	26	+30.634	7	8
9	32	(Italy) Fabrizio Lai	Aprilia	26	+1:12.253	15	7
10	17	(Czech Republic) Karel Abraham	Aprilia	26	+1:12.319	19	6
11	28	(Germany) Dirk Heidolf	Aprilia	26	+1:14.060	16	5
12	41	(Spain) Aleix Espargaró	Aprilia	26	+1:14.159	14	4
13	16	(France) Jules Cluzel	Aprilia	26	+1:14.575	22	3
14	50	(Republic of Ireland) Eugene Laverty	Honda	26	+1:30.978	17	2
15	10	(Hungary) Imre Tóth	Aprilia	25	+1 lap	20	1
16	31	(Spain) Álvaro Molina	Aprilia	25	+1 lap	24	
17	89	(China) Ho Wan Chow	Aprilia	24	+2 laps	25	
Ret	7	(Spain) Efrén Vázquez	Aprilia	23	Accident	21	
Ret	8	(Thailand) Ratthapark Wilairot	Honda	23	Accident	18	
Ret	4	(Japan) Hiroshi Aoyama	KTM	22	Retirement	5	
Ret	73	(Japan) Shuhei Aoyama	Honda	18	Retirement	12	
Ret	45	(United Kingdom) Dan Linfoot	Aprilia	18	Retirement	23	
Ret	25	(Italy) Alex Baldolini	Aprilia	7	Retirement	26	
Ret	36	(Finland) Mika Kallio	KTM	4	Retirement	4	
Ret	55	(Japan) Yuki Takahashi	Honda	2	Accident	9	
Ret	15	(Italy) Roberto Locatelli	Gilera	1	Accident	13	
DNQ	84	(United Kingdom) Luke Lawrence	Aprilia		Did not qualify		
DNQ	53	(Spain) Santiago Barragán	Honda		Did not qualify		
DNQ	88	(China) Zhu Wang	Aprilia		Did not qualify		
OFFICIAL 250cc REPORT

== 125 cc classification ==
Pos.	No.	Rider	Manufacturer	Laps	Time/Retired	Grid	Points
1	55	(Spain) Héctor Faubel	Aprilia	23	40:46.337	8	25
2	14	(Hungary) Gábor Talmácsi	Aprilia	23	+0.132	4	20
3	44	(Spain) Pol Espargaró	Aprilia	23	+0.235	7	16
4	24	(Italy) Simone Corsi	Aprilia	23	+1.001	3	13
5	6	(Spain) Joan Olivé	Aprilia	23	+1.188	10	11
6	17	(Germany) Stefan Bradl	Aprilia	23	+7.579	9	10
7	71	(Japan) Tomoyoshi Koyama	KTM	23	+8.297	11	9
8	75	(Italy) Mattia Pasini	Aprilia	23	+8.957	1	8
9	35	(Italy) Raffaele De Rosa	Aprilia	23	+8.984	18	7
10	34	(Switzerland) Randy Krummenacher	KTM	23	+14.052	12	6
11	12	(Spain) Esteve Rabat	Honda	23	+14.123	17	5
12	38	(United Kingdom) Bradley Smith	Honda	23	+18.145	15	4
13	52	(Czech Republic) Lukáš Pešek	Derbi	23	+21.118	2	3
14	7	(France) Alexis Masbou	Honda	23	+31.521	20	2
15	27	(Italy) Stefano Bianco	Aprilia	23	+31.612	23	1
16	63	(France) Mike Di Meglio	Honda	23	+31.648	14	
17	8	(Italy) Lorenzo Zanetti	Aprilia	23	+31.945	22	
18	29	(Italy) Andrea Iannone	Aprilia	23	+31.986	16	
19	15	(Italy) Federico Sandi	Aprilia	23	+44.317	27	
20	99	(United Kingdom) Danny Webb	Honda	23	+1:01.566	28	
21	53	(Italy) Simone Grotzkyj	Aprilia	23	+1:03.909	32	
22	20	(Italy) Roberto Tamburini	Aprilia	23	+1:04.002	25	
23	95	(Romania) Robert Mureșan	Derbi	23	+1:06.216	26	
24	62	(France) Louis Rossi	Honda	23	+1:09.350	33	
Ret	13	(Italy) Dino Lombardi	Honda	18	Retirement	29	
Ret	30	(Spain) Pere Tutusaus	Aprilia	15	Accident	30	
Ret	33	(Spain) Sergio Gadea	Aprilia	12	Retirement	6	
Ret	11	(Germany) Sandro Cortese	Aprilia	9	Accident	5	
Ret	60	(Austria) Michael Ranseder	Derbi	9	Accident	19	
Ret	51	(United States) Stevie Bonsey	KTM	8	Retirement	31	
Ret	18	(Spain) Nicolás Terol	Derbi	7	Retirement	13	
Ret	22	(Spain) Pablo Nieto	Aprilia	5	Retirement	21	
Ret	77	(Switzerland) Dominique Aegerter	Aprilia	4	Retirement	24	
DNS	37	(Netherlands) Joey Litjens	Honda		Did not start		
DNS	86	(Spain) Ricard Cardús	Aprilia		Did not start		
DNQ	61	(Portugal) Ivo Relvas	Aprilia		Did not qualify		
OFFICIAL 125cc REPORT

== Championship standings after the race (MotoGP) ==
Below are the standings for the top five riders and constructors after round fourteen has concluded.

Riders' Championship standings

Pos.	Rider	Points
1	(Australia) Casey Stoner	287
2	(Italy) Valentino Rossi	211
3	(Spain) Dani Pedrosa	188
4	(United States) John Hopkins	150
5	(Australia) Chris Vermeulen	147

Constructors' Championship standings

Pos.	Constructor	Points
1	(Italy) Ducati	299
2	(Japan) Honda	239
3	(Japan) Yamaha	238
4	(Japan) Suzuki	201
5	(Japan) Kawasaki	94

- Note: Only the top five positions are included for both sets of standings.

Previous race: 2007 San Marino Grand Prix	FIM Grand Prix World Championship; 2007 season	Next race: 2007 Japanese Grand Prix
Previous race: 2006 Portuguese Grand Prix	Portuguese motorcycle Grand Prix	Next race: 2008 Portuguese Grand Prix
