= Enrique Jerez =

Spanish motorcycle racer

- Nationality: Spanish
- Born: Enrique Jerez Rodríguez; 27 September 1986 (age 40); Cartagena, Spain

Enrique Jerez Rodríguez (Note: In this Spanish name, the first or paternal surname is Jerez and the second or maternal family name is Rodríguez.) (born 27 September 1986) is a Grand Prix motorcycle racer from Spain.

== Career statistics ==
=== By season ===
Season	Class	Motorcycle	Team	Number	Race	Win	Podium	Pole	FLap	Pts	Plcd
2004	125cc	Honda	TMR Competicion	71	3	0	0	0	0	0	NC
2005	125cc	Derbi	Team Stop & Go	51	2	0	0	0	0	2	34th
2005	125cc	Derbi	Caja Madrid - Derbi Racing	51	3	0	0	0	0	2	34th
2006	125cc	Aprilia	WTR Blauser USA	79	1	0	0	0	0	0	NC
2007	125cc	Honda	Kopron Team Scot	31	2	0	0	0	0	2	28th
2008	125cc	KTM	ISPA KTM Aran	28	3	0	0	0	0	1	32nd
Total					14	0	0	0	0	5	

=== Races by year ===
(key)

Year	Class	Bike	1	2	3	4	5	6	7	8	9	10	11	12	13	14	15	16	17	Pos	Pts
2004	125cc	Honda	RSA	SPA; 25	FRA	ITA	CAT; 26	NED	BRA	GER	GBR	CZE	POR	JPN	QAT	MAL	AUS	VAL; 26		NC	0
2005	125cc	Derbi	SPA	POR	CHN	FRA	ITA	CAT; Ret	NED	GBR	GER	CZE	JPN; 15	MAL; 19	QAT; 15	AUS	TUR	VAL; 18		34th	2
2006	125cc	Aprilia	SPA; 24	QAT	TUR	CHN	FRA	ITA	CAT	NED	GBR	GER	CZE	MAL	AUS	JPN	POR	VAL		NC	0
2007	125cc	Honda	QAT	SPA	TUR	CHN	FRA	ITA	CAT	GBR; 14	NED; 23	GER	CZE	RSM	POR	JPN	AUS	MAL	VAL	28th	2
2008	125cc	KTM	QAT	SPA	POR	CHN	FRA	ITA	CAT	GBR	NED	GER	RSM	INP	JPN	AUS; 19	MAL; Ret	VAL; 15		32nd	1
