= Patrick Unger =

German motorcycle racer

- Nationality: German
- Born: 30 July 1982 (age 44); Oberlungwitz, Germany
Motorcycle racing career statistics
125cc World Championship
Active years	2002-2005, 2007
Manufacturers	Honda, Aprilia
Championships	0
2007 championship position	NC (0 pts)
Starts / Wins / Podiums / Poles / F. laps / Points; 5 / 0 / 0 / 0 / 0 / 0

Patrick Unger (born 30 July 1982) is a German Grand Prix motorcycle racer.

== Grand Prix motorcycle racing career ==
Season	Class	Moto	Team	Number	Races	Win	Podiums	Pole	Pts	Position
2002	125cc	Honda	ADAC Sachsen Motorrad Unger	92	1	0	0	0	0	NC
2003	125cc	Honda	Adac Sachsenring jnr Racing	54	1	0	0	0	0	NC
2004	125cc	Aprilia	Motorrad Unger Racing	39	1	0	0	0	0	NC
2005	125cc	Aprilia	Motorrad Unger Racing	13	1	0	0	0	0	NC
2007	125cc	Aprilia	Sachsenring Motorrad Unger	66	1	0	0	0	0	NC
Total					**5**	**0**	**0**	**0**	**0**	

=== Races by year ===
(key) (Races in bold indicate pole position, races in italics indicate fastest lap)

Year	Class	Bike	1	2	3	4	5	6	7	8	9	10	11	12	13	14	15	16	17	Pos	Pts
2002	125cc	Honda	JPN	RSA	SPA	FRA	ITA	CAT	NED	GBR	GER; 30	CZE	POR	BRA	PAC	MAL	AUS	VAL		NC	0
2003	125cc	Honda	JPN	RSA	SPA	FRA	ITA	CAT	NED	GBR	GER; Ret	CZE	POR	BRA	PAC	MAL	AUS	VAL		NC	0
2004	125cc	Aprilia	RSA	SPA	FRA	ITA	CAT	NED	BRA	GER; 21	GBR	CZE	POR	JPN	QAT	MAL	AUS	VAL		NC	0
2005	125cc	Aprilia	SPA	POR	CHN	FRA	ITA	CAT	NED	GBR	GER; 21	CZE	JPN	MAL	QAT	AUS	TUR	VAL		NC	0
2007	125cc	Aprilia	QAT	SPA	TUR	CHN	FRA	ITA	CAT	GBR	NED	GER; Ret	CZE	SMR	POR	JPN	AUS	MAL	VAL	NC	0
