= Ferry Stoffer =

Dutch motorcycle racer

- Nationality: Dutch
- Born: 11 December 1985 (age 40); Hardewÿk, Netherlands
Motorcycle racing career statistics
125cc World Championship
Active years	2007
Manufacturers	Honda
Championships	0
2007 championship position	NC (0 pts)
Starts / Wins / Podiums / Poles / F. laps / Points; 1 / 0 / 0 / 0 / 0 / 0

Ferry Stoffer (born 11 December 1985) is a Dutch Grand Prix motorcycle racer.

== Career statistics ==
=== Grand Prix motorcycle racing ===
==== By season ====
Season	Class	Motorcycle	Team	Number	Race	Win	Podium	Pole	FLap	Pts	Plcd
2007	125cc	Honda	Motorsportklazienaveen	88	1	0	0	0	0	0	NC
Total					1	0	0	0	0	0	

=== Races by year ===
Year	Class	Bike	1	2	3	4	5	6	7	8	9	10	11	12	13	14	15	16	17	Pos	Points
2007	125cc	Honda	QAT	SPA	TUR	CHN	FRA	ITA	CAT	GBR	NED; 33	GER	CZE	RSM	POR	JPN	AUS	MAL	VAL	NC	0
