= Nayuta =

Nayuta is a large number in Japanese numerals denoting 10^{60} or 10^{72}.

== People with the given name ==
- Nayuta Mizuno (水野 那由太; born 1983), Japanese Grand Prix motorcycle racer

== Fictional characters ==
- Nayuta, a fictional character in the manga series Abara
- Nayuta (Chainsaw Man), a fictional character in the manga and anime series Chainsaw Man
- Nayuta, a fictional character in a PlayStation 2 game Monster Rancher EVO
- Nayuta, a fictional character in the Japanese television series I Will Be Your Bloom
- Nayuta, a fictional character in the action RPG game Goddess of Victory: Nikke
- I-LeS Nayuta, a fictional character in the manga and anime series Amaim Warrior at the Borderline
- Nayuta Amakasu, a fictional character in the manga and anime series Chihayafuru
- Nayuta Asahi, a fictional character in the Japanese multimedia project From Argonavis
- Nayuta Asōgi, a fictional character in the manga and anime series Maesetsu!
- Nayuta Azumi, a fictional character in the Japanese television series Atom's Last Shot
- Nayuta Hida, a fictional character in the manga series Hybrid × Heart Magias Academy Ataraxia
- Nayuta Kihara, a fictional character in the anime and manga series A Certain Magical Index
- Nayuta Kita, a fictional character in the anime and manga series Fresh Pretty Cure!
- Nayuta Kitahara, a fictional character in the Japanese romance visual novel Omoide ni Kawaru Kimi: Memories Off
- Nayuta Kuon, a fictional character in the Japanese erotic visual novel and adventure game Maple Colors
- Nayuta Kuon, a fictional character in the manga and anime series Ultimate Otaku Teacher
- Nayuta Moriyama, a fictional character in the anime series Shingu: Secret of the Stellar Wars
- Nahyuta Sahdmadhi, a fictional character in the adventure/visual novel games series Ace Attorney
- Nayuta Sakuragi, a fictional character in the manga series Honey × Honey Drops
- Nayuta Tenkawa, a fictional character in the manga and anime series Onimai: I'm Now Your Sister!
- Nayuta Yatanokami, a fictional character in the media mix project Paradox Live

== Other uses ==
- The Legend of Nayuta: Boundless Trails or Nayuta no Kiseki, a Japanese role-playing game
