= Eitzinger =

Eitzinger is a German surname, popular in Austria. Notable people with the surname include:

- Philipp Eitzinger (born 1990), Austrian motorcycle racer
- Rainer Eitzinger (born 1983), Austrian tennis player
