= Omar Menghi =

Italian motorcycle racer

- Nationality: Italian
- Born: 18 October 1975 (age 51); Rimini, Italy
Motorcycle racing career statistics
250cc World Championship
Active years	2006–2007
Manufacturers	Aprilia
Starts / Wins / Podiums / Poles / F. laps / Points; 3 / 0 / 0 / 0 / 0 / 0

Omar Menghi (born 18 October 1975) is an Italian motorcycle racer. His brother, Fabio Menghi, is also a motorcycle racer.

== Career statistics ==
=== Grand Prix motorcycle racing ===
==== By season ====
Season	Class	Motorcycle	Team	Race	Win	Podium	Pole	FLap	Pts	Plcd
2006	250cc	Aprilia	VFT Racing	1	0	0	0	0	0	NC
2007	250cc	Aprilia	VFT Racing	2	0	0	0	0	0	NC
Total				3	0	0	0	0	0	

==== Races by year ====
(key)

Year	Class	Bike	1	2	3	4	5	6	7	8	9	10	11	12	13	14	15	16	17	Pos.	Pts
2006	250cc	Aprilia	SPA	QAT	TUR	CHN	FRA	ITA; 16	CAT	NED	GBR	GER	CZE	MAL	AUS	JPN	POR	VAL		NC	0
2007	250cc	Aprilia	QAT	SPA	TUR	CHN	FRA	ITA; Ret	CAT	GBR	NED	GER	CZE	RSM; 18	POR	JPN	AUS	MAL	VAL	NC	0
