= Thomas Walther =

German motorcycle racer

- Nationality: German
- Born: 10 June 1977 (age 49); Schleiz, Germany
- Died: 30.09.2022; Schleiz

Thomas Walther (10 June 1977 – 30 September 2022) was a Grand Prix motorcycle racer from Germany. He entered the sport through the ADAC Junior Cup. In 2016, he won the FSP World of Motorcycles. Just three weeks before his death in 2022, he finished in third place in the overall rankings at the Frohburger Dreieck.

== Career statistics ==
=== By season ===
Season	Class	Motorcycle	Team	Number	Race	Win	Podium	Pole	FLap	Pts	Plcd
2005	250cc	Honda	NGR Racing	52	1	0	0	0	0	0	NC
2007	250cc	Honda	AMC Schleizer Dreieck ADAC	38	1	0	0	0	0	0	NC
Total					2	0	0	0	0	0	

==== Races by year ====
(key)

Year	Class	Bike	1	2	3	4	5	6	7	8	9	10	11	12	13	14	15	16	17	Pos.	Pts
2005	250cc	Honda	SPA	POR	CHN	FRA	ITA	CAT	NED	GBR	GER; 23	CZE	JPN	MAL	QAT	AUS	TUR	VAL		NC	0
2007	250cc	Honda	QAT	SPA	TUR	CHN	FRA	ITA	CAT	GBR	NED	GER; Ret	CZE	RSM	POR	JPN	AUS	MAL	VAL	NC	0
