= Sebastian Eckner =

German motorcycle racer

- Nationality: German
- Born: 3 June 1991 (age 35); Pennrich, Dresden, Germany
Motorcycle racing career statistics
125cc World Championship
Active years	2007
Manufacturers	Honda
Championships	0
2007 championship position	NC (0 pts)
Starts / Wins / Podiums / Poles / F. laps / Points; 1 / 0 / 0 / 0 / 0 / 0

Sebastian Eckner (born 3 June 1991) is a German motorcycle racer.

== Career statistics ==
=== Grand Prix motorcycle racing ===
==== By season ====
Season	Class	Motorcycle	Team	Number	Race	Win	Podium	Pole	FLap	Pts	Plcd
2007	125cc	Honda	Adac Sachsen Junior Team	67	1	0	0	0	0	0	NC
Total					1	0	0	0	0	0	

=== Races by year ===
Year	Class	Bike	1	2	3	4	5	6	7	8	9	10	11	12	13	14	15	16	17	Pos.	Points
2007	125cc	Honda	QAT	SPA	TUR	CHN	FRA	ITA	CAT	GBR	NED	GER; 29	CZE	RSM	POR	JPN	AUS	MAL	VAL	NC	0
