= Thomas Tallevi =

Italian motorcycle racer

- Nationality: Italian
- Born: 20 December 1982 (age 43); Pesaro, Italy
Motorcycle racing career statistics
250cc World Championship
Active years	2007
Manufacturers	Yamaha
Championships	0
2007 championship position	NC (0 pts)
Starts / Wins / Podiums / Poles / F. laps / Points; 1 / 0 / 0 / 0 / 0 / 0

Thomas Tallevi (born 20 December 1982) is an Italian Grand Prix motorcycle racer.

== Career statistics ==
=== CIV 125cc Championship ===
==== Races by year ====
(key) (Races in bold indicate pole position; races in italics indicate fastest lap)

Year	Bike	1	2	3	4	5	Pos	Pts
2001	Aprilia	MIS1; 16	MON; 3	**VAL**; 2	MIS2; 5	MIS3; Ret	6th	47

=== CIV Championship (Campionato Italiano Velocita) ===
==== Races by year ====
(key) (Races in bold indicate pole position; races in italics indicate fastest lap)

Year	Class	Bike	1	2	3	4	5	Pos	Pts
2002	125cc	Aprilia	IMO; Ret	VAL	MUG; 8	MIS1; 7	MIS2; Ret	14th	17

=== Grand Prix motorcycle racing ===
==== By season ====
Season	Class	Motorcycle	Team	Number	Race	Win	Podium	Pole	FLap	Pts	Plcd
2007	250cc	Yamaha	History Racing - TZ Club Italia	65	1	0	0	0	0	0	NC
Total					**1**	**0**	**0**	**0**	**0**	**0**	

=== Races by year ===
Year	Class	Bike	1	2	3	4	5	6	7	8	9	10	11	12	13	14	15	16	17	Pos	Points
2007	250cc	Yamaha	QAT	SPA	TUR	CHN	FRA	ITA; 24	CAT	GBR	NED	GER	CZE	RSM	POR	JPN	AUS	MAL	VAL	NC	0
