= Simone Sancioni =

Italian motorcycle racer

- Nationality: Italian
- Born: 8 November 1988 (age 38); Cesena, Italy
Motorcycle racing career statistics
125cc World Championship
Active years	2007
Manufacturers	Aprilia
Championships	0
2007 championship position	NC (0 pts)
Starts / Wins / Podiums / Poles / F. laps / Points; 2 / 0 / 0 / 0 / 0 / 0

Simone Sancioni (born 8 November 1988) is an Italian motorcycle racer.

== Career statistics ==
=== CIV Championship (Campionato Italiano Velocita) ===
==== Races by year ====
(key) (Races in bold indicate pole position; races in italics indicate fastest lap)

Year	Class	Bike	1	2	3	4	5	6	Pos	Pts
2004	125cc	Honda	MUG; 13	IMO; Ret	VAL1; 13	MIS; 22	VAL2; 18		24th	6
2005	125cc	Honda	VAL; Ret	MON; 20	IMO; 11	MIS1; Ret	MUG; Ret	MIS2; Ret	26th	5

=== Grand Prix motorcycle racing ===
==== By season ====
Season	Class	Motorcycle	Team	Race	Win	Podium	Pole	FLap	Pts	Plcd
2007	125cc	Aprilia	RCGM Team	2	0	0	0	0	0	NC
Total				**2**	**0**	**0**	**0**	**0**	**0**	

==== Races by year ====
Year	Class	Bike	1	2	3	4	5	6	7	8	9	10	11	12	13	14	15	16	17	Pos	Points
2007	125cc	Aprilia	QAT	SPA	TUR	CHN	FRA	ITA; 17	CAT	GBR	NED	GER	CZE	RSM; 22	POR	JPN	AUS	MAL	VAL	NC	0
