= Xiao Jin =

Chinese motorcycle racer

- Nationality: Chinese
- Born: 2 March 1985 (age 41); Hubei, China
Motorcycle racing career statistics
250cc World Championship
Active years	2006-2007
Manufacturers	Yamaha
2007 championship position	NC (0 pts)
Starts / Wins / Podiums / Poles / F. laps / Points; 2 / 0 / 0 / 0 / 0 / 0

Xiao Jin (born March 2, 1985) is a Chinese Grand Prix motorcycle racer.

== Career statistics ==
=== By season ===
Season	Class	Motorcycle	Team	Number	Race	Win	Podium	Pole	FLap	Pts	Plcd
2006	250cc	Yamaha	Yamaha Tianjian Racing Team	63	1	0	0	0	0	0	NC
2007	250cc	Yamaha	Yes! Yamaha Tianjian	63	1	0	0	0	0	0	NC
Total					2	0	0	0	0	0	

==== Races by year ====
(key)

Year	Class	Bike	1	2	3	4	5	6	7	8	9	10	11	12	13	14	15	16	17	Pos.	Pts
2006	250cc	Yamaha	SPA	QAT	TUR	CHN; 21	FRA	ITA	CAT	NED	GBR	GER	CZE	MAL	AUS	JPN	POR	VAL		NC	0
2007	250cc	Yamaha	QAT	SPA	TUR	CHN; 19	FRA	ITA	CAT	GBR	NED	GER	CZE	RSM	POR	JPN	AUS	MAL	VAL	NC	0
