= Tom Hayward (motorcyclist) =

British motorcycle racer

- Nationality: (United Kingdom) British
- Born: 30 September 1982 (age 44); Lincoln, England
Motorcycle racing career statistics
125cc World Championship
Active years	2007
Manufacturers	Honda
Championships	0
2007 championship position	NC (0 pts)
Starts / Wins / Podiums / Poles / F. laps / Points; 1 / 0 / 0 / 0 / 0 / 0

Tom Hayward (born 30 September 1982) is a British Grand Prix motorcycle racer.

== Career statistics ==
=== Grand Prix motorcycle racing ===
==== By season ====
Season	Class	Motorcycle	Team	Number	Race	Win	Podium	Pole	FLap	Pts	Plcd
2007	125cc	Honda	KRP	81	1	0	0	0	0	0	NC
Total					**1**	**0**	**0**	**0**	**0**	**0**	

=== Races by year ===
Year	Class	Bike	1	2	3	4	5	6	7	8	9	10	11	12	13	14	15	16	17	Pos	Points
2007	125cc	Honda	QAT	SPA	TUR	CHN	FRA	ITA	CAT	GBR; 30	NED	GER	CZE	RSM	POR	JPN	AUS	MAL	VAL	NC	0

=== British 125cc Championship ===
(key) (Races in bold indicate pole position, races in italics indicate fastest lap)

Year	Bike	1	2	3	4	5	6	7	8	9	10	11	12	Pos	Pts
2009	Honda	BHI; 2	OUL; 4	DON; Ret	THR; 9	SNE; 4	KNO; 10	MAL; Ret	BHGP; 10	CAD; 4	CRO; Ret	SIL; 11	OUL; 9	**8th**	**90**
