= Ronald Beitler =

Dutch motorcycle racer

- Nationality: Dutch
- Born: 25 July 1977 (age 49); Ermelo, Netherlands
Motorcycle racing career statistics
250cc World Championship
Active years	2007
Manufacturers	Honda
Championships	0
2007 championship position	NC (0 pts)
Starts / Wins / Podiums / Poles / F. laps / Points; 1 / 0 / 0 / 0 / 0 / 0

Ronald Beitler (born 25 July 1977) is a Dutch Grand Prix motorcycle racer.

== Career statistics ==
=== Grand Prix motorcycle racing ===
==== By season ====
Season	Class	Motorcycle	Team	Number	Race	Win	Podium	Pole	FLap	Pts	Plcd
2007	250cc	Honda	Maro Racing	69	1	0	0	0	0	0	NC
Total					1	0	0	0	0	0	

=== Races by year ===
Year	Class	Bike	1	2	3	4	5	6	7	8	9	10	11	12	13	14	15	16	17	Pos	Points
2007	250cc	Honda	QAT	SPA	TUR	CHN	FRA	ITA	CAT	GBR	NED; 23	GER	CZE	RSM	POR	JPN	AUS	MAL	VAL	NC	0
