= Nikolett Kovács =

Hungarian motorcycle racer

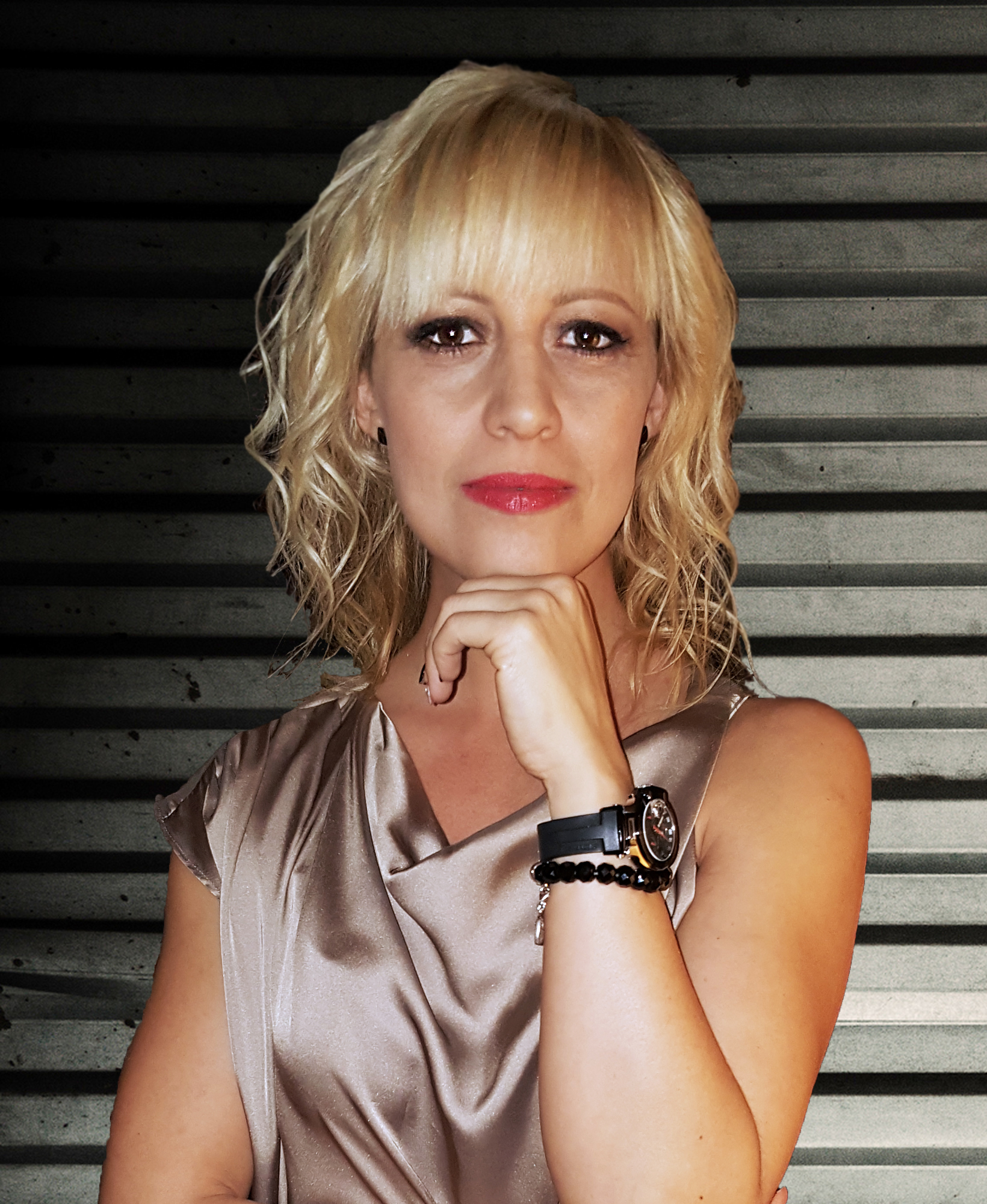
- Nationality: Hungarian
- Born: 30 August 1982 (age 44); Budapest, Hungary

Nikolett Kovács is a Hungarian Grand Prix motorcycle racer.

== Career statistics ==
=== By season ===
Season	Class	Motorcycle	Team	Number	Race	Win	Podium	Pole	FLap	Pts	Plcd
2007	125cc	Honda	Cemelog-Hanusch	39	0	0	0	0	0	0	NC
Total					0	0	0	0	0	0	

=== Races by year ===
Year	Class	Bike	1	2	3	4	5	6	7	8	9	10	11	12	13	14	15	16	17	Pos	Points
2007	125cc	Honda	QAT	SPA	TUR; DNQ	CHN	FRA	ITA	CAT	GBR	NED	GER	CZE	RSM	POR	JPN	AUS	MAL	VAL	NC	0
