= Philipp Eitzinger =

Austrian motorcycle racer

- Nationality: Austrian
- Born: 12 July 1990 (age 36); Neunkirchen, Austria

Philipp Eitzinger is a former Grand Prix motorcycle racer from Austria. He made his motorcycle racing debut at 11 years old in the Austrian Minibike Championship and promptly gained the title in his maiden season. In 2003, he moved up into the 125cc Class of the Austrian Motorcycle Racing Championship and also repeated as champion in his first season. In 2004, Eitzinger made his debut in the 125cc Class of the IDM-Championship aboard a Honda and finished in 14th position in the final standings. For 2005, he managed to improve to eighth place, and in 2006, he improved into sixth position in the final standings.

Eitzinger became the 125cc European Champion on a Honda in 2006.

In the November of 2007, Eitzinger announced his retirement from motorcycle racing at the age of 17.

== Career statistics ==
=== By season ===
Season	Class	Motorcycle	Team	Number	Race	Win	Podium	Pole	FLap	Pts	Plcd
2007	125cc	Honda	Wintex Racing Austria	85	2	0	0	0	0	0	NC
Total					2	0	0	0	0	0	

=== Races by year ===
Year	Class	Bike	1	2	3	4	5	6	7	8	9	10	11	12	13	14	15	16	17	Pos	Points
2007	125cc	Honda	QAT	SPA	TUR	CHN	FRA	ITA	CAT; Ret	GBR	NED; 29	GER	CZE	RSM	POR	JPN	AUS	MAL	VAL	NC	0
