= 2007 Grand Prix motorcycle racing season =

Sports season

2007 F.I.M. Grand Prix motorcycle racing season

Seasons
- ← 2006 2008 →

2007 World Champions

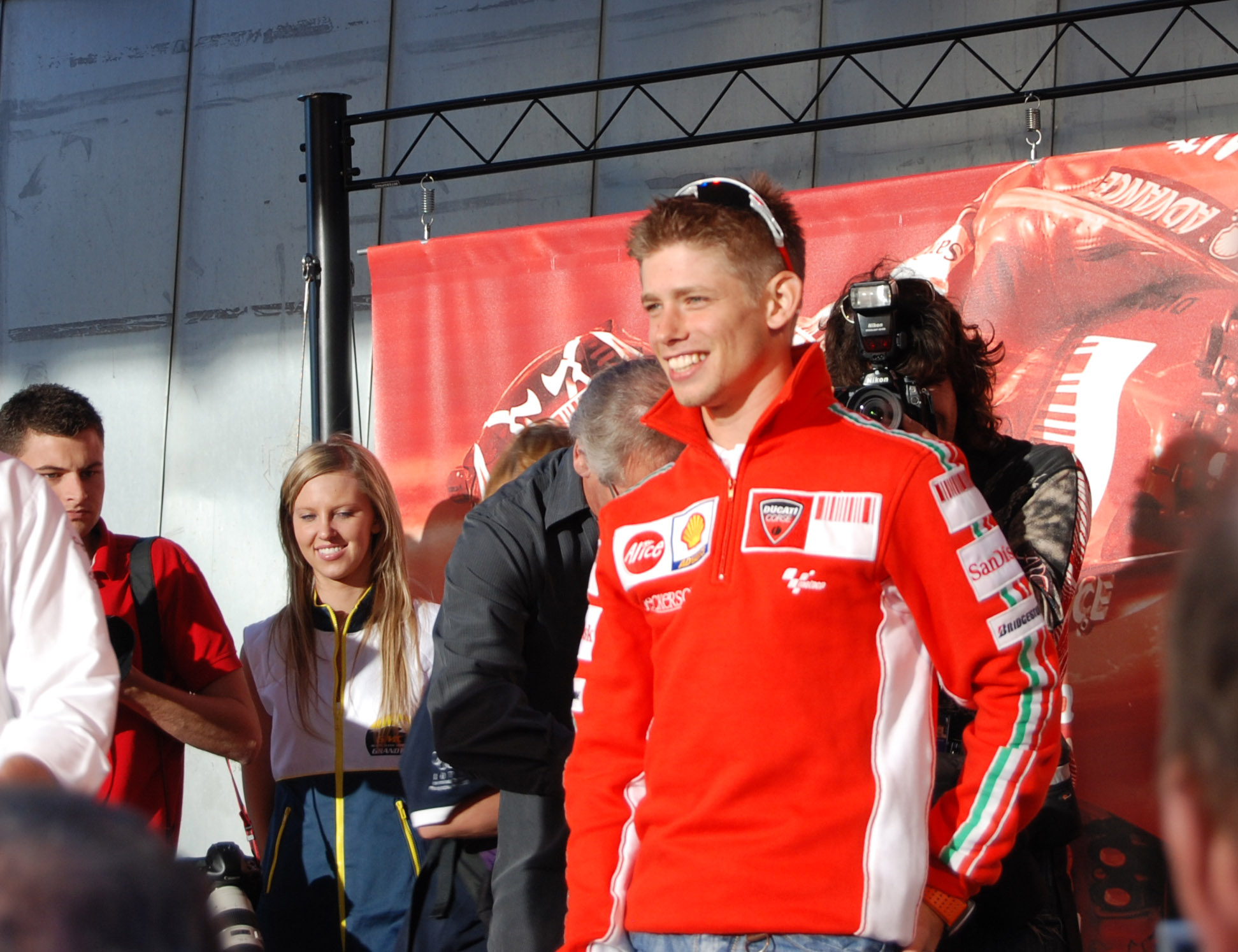
Casey Stoner became the MotoGP World Champion

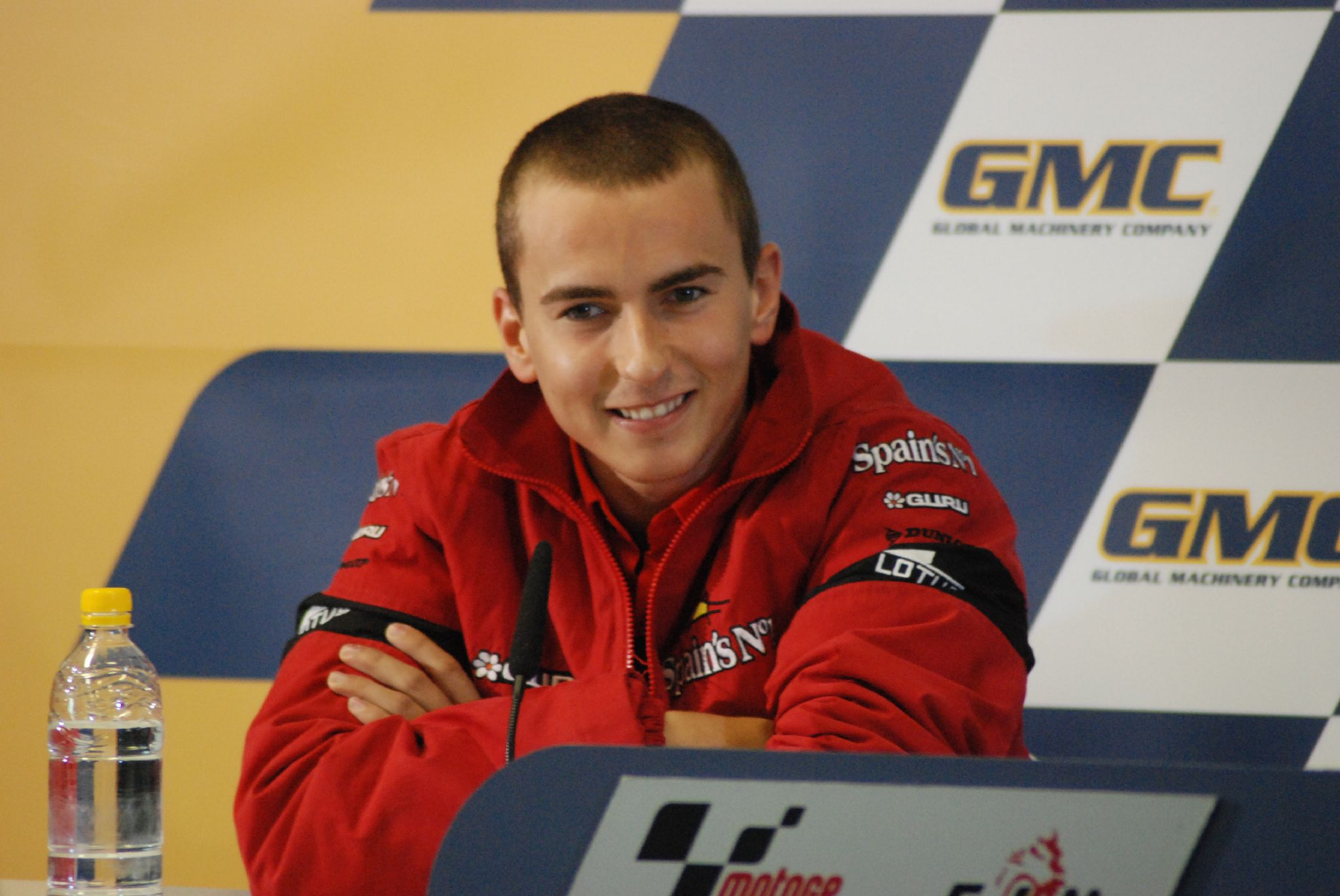
Jorge Lorenzo became the 250cc World Champion

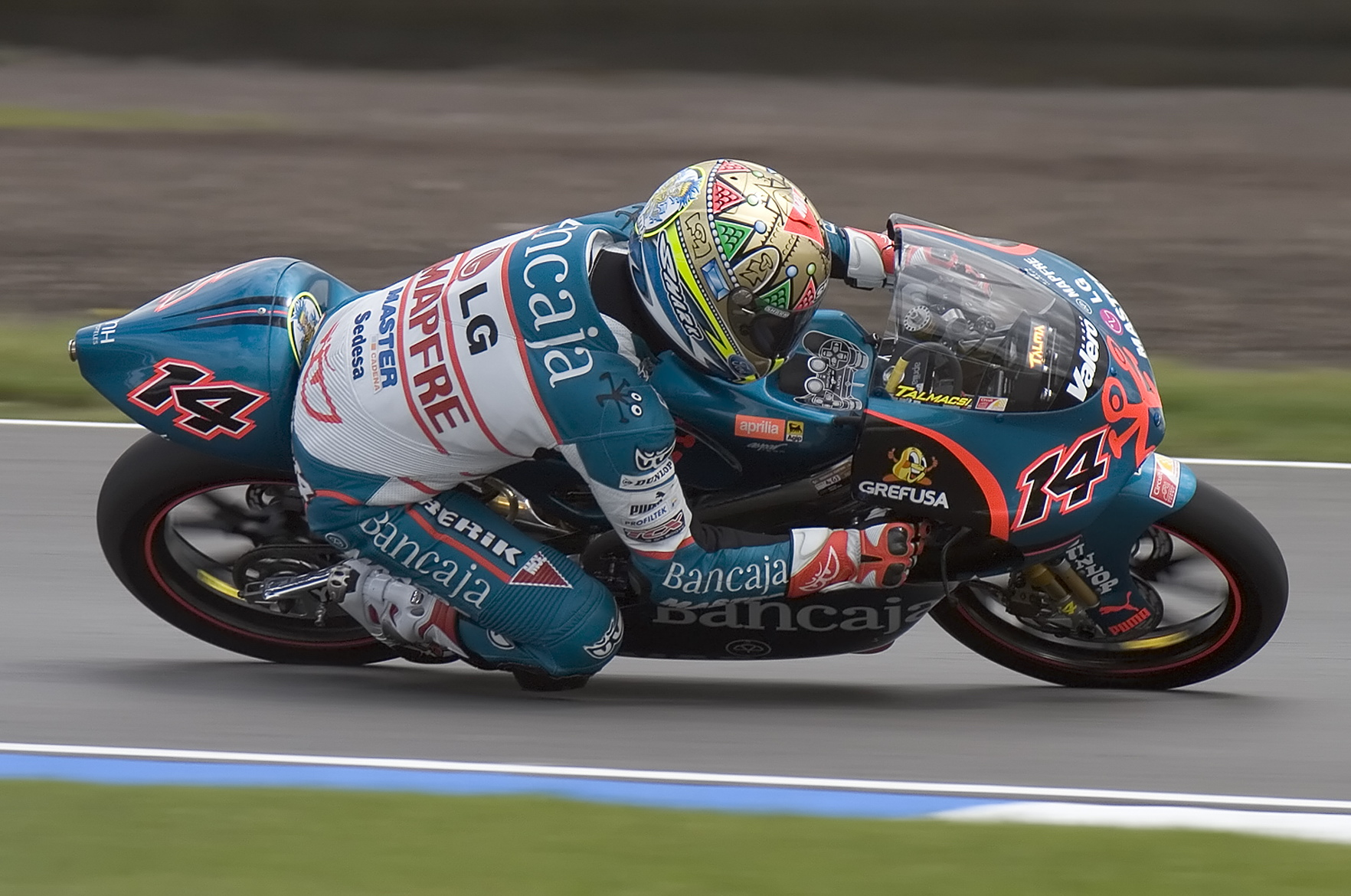
Gábor Talmácsi became the 125cc World Champion

The 2007 Grand Prix motorcycle racing season was the 59th F.I.M. Road Racing World Championship season. The season consisted of 18 races for the MotoGP class and 17 for the 125cc and 250cc classes, beginning with the Qatar motorcycle Grand Prix on 10 March 2007 and ending with the Valencian Community motorcycle Grand Prix on 4 November.

== Season summary ==
The 2007 season was significant as it introduced a new regulation which specifies that competitors in the MotoGP class were allowed use up to 800cc motorcycles; between 2002 and 2006, competitors had been allowed to use 990 cc motorcycles. While the 800cc motorcycles had less power than their 990cc counterparts, their ability to brake later and carry more speed through turns due to their lighter weight (which actually increased their power to weight ratio) allowed them to break lap records in pre-season testing.

Casey Stoner won the MotoGP title, winning 10 of the 18 races to finish with a lead of 125 points over second placed Dani Pedrosa. Jorge Lorenzo won his second 250cc title, and Gábor Talmácsi won the 125cc title.

Stoner had a breakthrough season on the Ducati, the team winning its first world title on the Grand Prix scene. It was also the first time since 1974 that the premiere category had not been won by a Japanese constructor. The new 800cc Ducati engine had a significant advantage over the other manufacturers in straight line speed but was tricky to ride through corners for Stoner's experienced teammate Loris Capirossi. Stoner was in strong contention early on but Valentino Rossi was very close for a long period of the season, before Stoner started to pull away at mid-season and sealed his title with several races to go, with Rossi's title challenge fading.

Up to the end of 2006, speculation suggested that Honda would have the advantage of the new 800cc engines, as they could modify their existing engines easier than other manufacturers. In practice, Honda suffered the most from the regulation change, with only Dani Pedrosa and Marco Melandri making any impression on the leaders. Stoner scored a string of wins for Ducati, Suzuki saw Chris Vermeulen take their first win since the advent of four-stroke regulations and John Hopkins posted his first podium finish. The Kawasaki team also made progress with improved results.

In addition to the capacity reduction, MotoGP teams were also restricted to 31 tires per race weekend per rider. This change seemed to have favored the Bridgestone's wider performance range over the more temperature- and track-specific Michelins. Pressure from top riders and declining viewership led Dorna CEO Carmelo Ezpeleta to propose a single-tire manufacturer for MotoGP. In the end, rules were amended to allow 9 more tires per weekend per rider, and Valentino Rossi switched to Bridgestone for the 2008 season while his factory Yamaha teammate Jorge Lorenzo used Michelins.

2007 was also final season of Dunlop competed in MotoGP class to date.

== 2007 Grand Prix season calendar ==
The following Grands Prix were scheduled to take place in 2007:

Round	Date	Grand Prix	Circuit
1	10 March ††	Commercialbank Grand Prix of Qatar	Losail International Circuit
2	25 March	(Spain) Gran Premio bwin.com de España	Circuito de Jerez
3	22 April	Grand Prix of Turkey	Istanbul Park
4	6 May	Sinopec Great Wall Lubricants Grand Prix of China	Shanghai International Circuit
5	20 May	Alice Grand Prix de France	Bugatti Circuit
6	27 May	(Italy) Gran Premio d'Italia Alice	Mugello Circuit
7	10 June	(Catalonia) Gran Premi Cinzano de Catalunya	Circuit de Catalunya
8	24 June	(United Kingdom) Nickel & Dime British Grand Prix	Donington Park
9	30 June ††	(Netherlands) A-Style TT Assen	TT Circuit Assen
10	15 July	(Germany) Alice Motorrad Grand Prix Deutschland	Sachsenring
11	22 July †	(United States) Red Bull U.S. Grand Prix	Mazda Raceway Laguna Seca
12	19 August	(Czech Republic) Cardion AB Grand Prix České republiky	Brno Circuit
13	2 September	Gran Premio Cinzano di San Marino e Della Riviera di Rimini	Misano World Circuit
14	16 September	bwin.com Grande Prémio de Portugal	Autódromo do Estoril
15	23 September	A-Style Grand Prix of Japan	Twin Ring Motegi
16	14 October	(Australia) GMC Australian Grand Prix	Phillip Island Grand Prix Circuit
17	21 October	(Malaysia) Polini Malaysian Motorcycle Grand Prix	Sepang International Circuit
18	4 November	(Valencian Community) Gran Premio bwin.com de la Comunitat Valenciana	Circuit Ricardo Tormo

† = MotoGP class only
†† = Saturday race

=== Calendar changes ===
- The Spanish and Qatar Grand Prix swapped places, with Qatar hosting the opening round instead of Spain.
- The Dutch TT and British Grand Prix swapped places, with Britain hosting the eighth round while the Netherlands hosted the ninth round.
- Only the MotoGP class raced during the United States Grand Prix because of a Californian law on air pollution, preventing the 125 and 250cc classes from racing.
- The San Marino Grand Prix was added on the calendar after an 18-year absence. The venue hosting the round was the Misano World Circuit instead of the previously used Mugello Circuit.
- The Malaysian and Australian Grand Prix were moved back, from 10 and 17 September to 21 and 14 October respectively.
- The Malaysian and Australian Grand Prix swapped places, with Australia hosting the sixteenth round while Malaysia hosting the seventeenth round.
- The Japanese and Portuguese Grand Prix were moved forward, from 24 September and 15 October to 23 and 16 September respectively.
- The Japanese and Portuguese Grand Prix swapped places, with Portugal hosting the fourteenth round while Japan hosted the fifteenth round.

== Regulation changes ==
The following changes are made to the regulation for the 2007 season:

=== Sporting regulations ===
- A rider cannot stop in the pits when observing a ride-through penalty.
- Any use of two-way radio voice communication is now prohibited.

=== Technical regulations ===
- Originally in 2004, it was decided to reduce the engine capacity of all bikes from 990cc to 900cc from the 2007 season onwards in the MotoGP class. However, it was decided to instead limit it to 800cc instead in 2005.
- The minimum weights for the bikes has been changed for the MotoGP class. The weights are now as follows:
  - For bikes with two cylinders or less, the minimum weight will be 133 kg.
  - For bikes with three cylinders, the minimum weight will be 140,5 kg.
  - For bikes with four cylinders, the minimum weight will be 148 kg.
  - For bikes with five cylinders, the minimum weight will be 155, 5 kg.
  - For bikes with six cylinders or more, the minimum weight will be 163 kg.
- The use of oval pistons will now be banned in the MotoGP class.
- From this year onwards, the use of two-stroke engines will now be banned in the MotoGP class.
- The fuel tank capacity for all bikes will be lowered from 22 to 21 litres in the MotoGP class.
- Changes have been made for the use of fuel, oil and other coolants. Unleaded petrol will comply with the FIM specifications if they have the following features:

- Property Units Min. Max. Test Method RON 95.0 102.0 ISO 5164
- MON 85.0 90.0 ISO 5163
- Oxygen % m/m 2.7 ASTM D 4815
- Nitrogen % m/m 0.2 ASTM D 4629
- Benzene % v/v 1.0 EN 238
- RVP kPa 90 EN 13016-1
- Lead g/L 0.005 EN 237
- Density at 15 °C kg/m3 720.0 775,0 780.0 ASTM D 4052
- Oxidation Stability minutes 360 ASTM D 525
- Existent gum mg/100 mL 5.0 EN ISO 6246
- Sulphur mg/kg 50,0 ASTM D 5453
- Copper Corrosion rating C1 ISO 2160
- Distillation:
- E at 70 °C % v/v 22,0 15.0 50.0 ISO 3405
- E at 100 °C % v/v 46.0 71.0 ISO 3405
- E at 150 °C % v/v 75.0 ISO 3405
- Final Boiling Point °C 210,0 215.0ISO 3405
- Residue % v/v 2.0 ISO 3405
- Olefins(*) % v/v 18.0 ASTM D 1319:1998
- Gas Chromatography
- Aromatics(*) % v/v 35,0 42.0 ASTM D 1319:1998
- Gas Chromatography
- Total di-olefins % m/m 1.0 GCMS / HPLC

- New tyre restrictions will be introduced for the MotoGP class. A wet tyre is specified as 'a tyre which has a land to sea ratio of at least 20% overall, and a minimum ratio of 7% in each third of the section profile'. The tyre can be shaped or hand cut, but each groove must have a minimum depth of at least three millimeters over 90% of its total length. Any tyre with a land to sea ratio which is lower than 20% will be marked as a slick tyre. If there is a dispute, the decision of the Technical Director will be considered final.
- Before the start of the season (defined as 'the day before the start of the first IRTA MotoGP test of the current year'), all teams must register the tyre brand they will be using with the Grand Prix Technical Director. If a team opts to change its designated tyre brand during the season, said team must inform the Technical Director via writing prior to the start before the start of examining at the event where the change will happen.
- Teams that are supplied by a tyre manufacturer that has accomplished at least two MotoGP race wins in dry conditions since the first race of the 2005 season will be restricted in the number of slick tyres that each of the teams' riders can use at a single event. The amount will be as follows: During all practice sessions, the warm-up and the race, a maximum of 31 slick tyres will be permitted. Of this, the amount of allowed front tyres are fourteen and the amount of allowed rear tyres are seventeen.
- When a tyre manufacturer who is not subject to the limitations at the beginning of the season manages to score two MotoGP wins in dry conditions during the current season, it will become subject to the restrictions at the third event after the one where the second win was accomplished.
- Between 12:00 and 17:00 on the day before the start of the first official practice session, the Technical Director will mark the available tyres for each entered rider.
- Every motorcycle entering the track fitted with either slick or hand cut tyres must have its tyres checked for compliance.
- In the event of an interrupted race, a rider must use tyres from his designation of marked tyres for the restarted race.
- In the unlikely event of a tyre being damaged accidentally during the process of fitting it on, it may be replaced with a new tyre of the same specification with the consent of the Technical Director. These replacement tyres will be marked and included in the assignment of the specific rider.
- If an uncommon or unpredictable safety concern emerges for a manufacturer during an even, causing a team supplied with its tyres to not safely compete in the race, then that manufacturer must inform and prove the seriousness of the problem to the Technical Director. The Technical Director may then ask the Race Direction to permit an exception. A request must be made before 17:00 on the day of qualifying practice. If an exception is allowed, each rider using tyres supplied by the manufacturer which is permitted the exception will be supplied with three tyres of a new specification (front and/or rear depending on the discovery of the problem). Such replacement tyres will be marked by the Technical Director and only these tyres can be used in the race. A new provisional starting grid will be published with all of the riders supplied with the tyres of the manufacturers granted the exception starting at the bottom of the grid in the order of their qualifying positions.

== 2007 Grand Prix season results ==
Round	Date	Grand Prix	Circuit	125cc winner	250cc winner	MotoGP winner	Report
1	10 March ††	Qatar motorcycle Grand Prix	Losail	(Spain) Héctor Faubel	(Spain) Jorge Lorenzo	(Australia) Casey Stoner	Report
2	25 March	(Spain) Spanish motorcycle Grand Prix	Jerez	(Hungary) Gábor Talmácsi	(Spain) Jorge Lorenzo	(Italy) Valentino Rossi	Report
3	22 April	(Turkey) Turkish motorcycle Grand Prix	Istanbul	(Italy) Simone Corsi	(Italy) Andrea Dovizioso	(Australia) Casey Stoner	Report
4	6 May	(China) Chinese motorcycle Grand Prix	Shanghai	(Czech Republic) Lukáš Pešek	(Spain) Jorge Lorenzo	(Australia) Casey Stoner	Report
5	20 May	(France) French motorcycle Grand Prix	Le Mans	(Spain) Sergio Gadea	(Spain) Jorge Lorenzo	(Australia) Chris Vermeulen	Report
6	27 May	(Italy) Italian motorcycle Grand Prix	Mugello	(Spain) Héctor Faubel	(Spain) Álvaro Bautista	(Italy) Valentino Rossi	Report
7	10 June	(Catalonia) Catalan motorcycle Grand Prix	Catalunya	(Japan) Tomoyoshi Koyama	(Spain) Jorge Lorenzo	(Australia) Casey Stoner	Report
8	24 June	(United Kingdom) British motorcycle Grand Prix	Donington	(Italy) Mattia Pasini	(Italy) Andrea Dovizioso	(Australia) Casey Stoner	Report
9	30 June ††	(Netherlands) Dutch TT	Assen	(Italy) Mattia Pasini	(Spain) Jorge Lorenzo	(Italy) Valentino Rossi	Report
10	15 July	(Germany) German motorcycle Grand Prix	Sachsenring	(Hungary) Gábor Talmácsi	(Japan) Hiroshi Aoyama	(Spain) Dani Pedrosa	Report
11	22 July †	United States motorcycle Grand Prix	Laguna Seca	No 125cc and 250cc race		(Australia) Casey Stoner	Report
12	19 August	Czech Republic motorcycle Grand Prix	Brno	(Spain) Héctor Faubel	(Spain) Jorge Lorenzo	(Australia) Casey Stoner	Report
13	2 September	San Marino and Rimini Riviera motorcycle Grand Prix	Misano	(Italy) Mattia Pasini	(Spain) Jorge Lorenzo	(Australia) Casey Stoner	Report
14	16 September	(Portugal) Portuguese motorcycle Grand Prix	Estoril	(Spain) Héctor Faubel	(Spain) Álvaro Bautista	(Italy) Valentino Rossi	Report
15	23 September	(Japan) Japanese motorcycle Grand Prix	Motegi	(Italy) Mattia Pasini	(Finland) Mika Kallio	(Italy) Loris Capirossi	Report
16	14 October	(Australia) Australian motorcycle Grand Prix	Phillip Island	(Czech Republic) Lukáš Pešek	(Spain) Jorge Lorenzo	(Australia) Casey Stoner	Report
17	21 October	(Malaysia) Malaysian motorcycle Grand Prix	Sepang	(Hungary) Gábor Talmácsi	(Japan) Hiroshi Aoyama	(Australia) Casey Stoner	Report
18	4 November	Valencian Community motorcycle Grand Prix	Valencia	(Spain) Héctor Faubel	(Finland) Mika Kallio	(Spain) Dani Pedrosa	Report

† = MotoGP class only
†† = Saturday Race

== Participants ==
=== MotoGP participants ===
Team	Constructor	Motorcycle	Tyre	No.	Rider	Rounds
(Italy) Ducati Marlboro Team; Ducati Team (rd 11)	Ducati	Desmosedici GP7	B	27	(Australia) Casey Stoner	All
(Italy) Ducati Marlboro Team; Ducati Team (rd 11)	Ducati	Desmosedici GP7	B	65	(Italy) Loris Capirossi	All
(Italy) Pramac d'Antin	Ducati	Desmosedici GP7	B	4	(Brazil) Alex Barros	All
(Italy) Pramac d'Antin	Ducati	Desmosedici GP7	B	66	(Germany) Alex Hofmann	1–10, 13–14
(Italy) Pramac d'Antin	Ducati	Desmosedici GP7	B	57	(United Kingdom) Chaz Davies	11, 16–18
(Italy) Pramac d'Antin	Ducati	Desmosedici GP7	B	22	(Spain) Iván Silva	12
(Italy) Pramac d'Antin	Ducati	Desmosedici GP7	B	72	(Japan) Shinichi Ito	15
(Japan) Repsol Honda Team	Honda	RC212V	M	1	(United States) Nicky Hayden	All
(Japan) Repsol Honda Team	Honda	RC212V	M	26	(Spain) Dani Pedrosa	All
(Italy) Honda Gresini	Honda	RC212V	B	24	(Spain) Toni Elías	1–9, 12–18
(Italy) Honda Gresini	Honda	RC212V	B	84	(Italy) Michel Fabrizio	10
(Italy) Honda Gresini	Honda	RC212V	B	17	(Canada) Miguel Duhamel	11
(Italy) Honda Gresini	Honda	RC212V	B	33	(Italy) Marco Melandri	All
(Monaco) Konica Minolta Honda	Honda	RC212V	M	56	(Japan) Shinya Nakano	All
(Monaco) Honda LCR	Honda	RC212V	M	7	(Spain) Carlos Checa	All
(United Kingdom) Ilmor GP†	Ilmor GP	X3	M	88	(Australia) Andrew Pitt	1
(United Kingdom) Ilmor GP†	Ilmor GP	X3	M	99	(United Kingdom) Jeremy McWilliams	1
(Japan) Kawasaki Racing Team	Kawasaki	Ninja ZX-RR	B	14	(France) Randy de Puniet	All
(Japan) Kawasaki Racing Team	Kawasaki	Ninja ZX-RR	B	19	(France) Olivier Jacque	1–4, 6–7
(Japan) Kawasaki Racing Team	Kawasaki	Ninja ZX-RR	B	11	(Spain) Fonsi Nieto	5
(Japan) Kawasaki Racing Team	Kawasaki	Ninja ZX-RR	B	13	(Australia) Anthony West	8–18
(Japan) Kawasaki Racing Team	Kawasaki	Ninja ZX-RR	B	95	(United States) Roger Lee Hayden	11
(Japan) Kawasaki Racing Team	Kawasaki	Ninja ZX-RR	B	87	(Japan) Akira Yanagawa	15
(United States) Team Roberts	Team Roberts	KR212V	M	10	(United States) Kenny Roberts Jr.	1–7
(United States) Team Roberts	Team Roberts	KR212V	M	80	(United States) Kurtis Roberts	8–18
(United States) Team Roberts	Team Roberts	KR212V	M	80	(United States) Kurtis Roberts	6–7
(Japan) Rizla Suzuki MotoGP	Suzuki	GSV-R	B	21	(United States) John Hopkins	All
(Japan) Rizla Suzuki MotoGP	Suzuki	GSV-R	B	71	(Australia) Chris Vermeulen	All
(Japan) Rizla Suzuki MotoGP	Suzuki	GSV-R	B	64	(Japan) Kousuke Akiyoshi	2, 15
(Japan) Rizla Suzuki MotoGP	Suzuki	GSV-R	B	9	(Japan) Nobuatsu Aoki	17
(Japan) Fiat Yamaha Team	Yamaha	YZR-M1	M	5	(United States) Colin Edwards	All
(Japan) Fiat Yamaha Team	Yamaha	YZR-M1	M	46	(Italy) Valentino Rossi	All
(France) Dunlop Yamaha Tech 3	Yamaha	YZR-M1	D	6	(Japan) Makoto Tamada	All
(France) Dunlop Yamaha Tech 3	Yamaha	YZR-M1	D	50	(France) Sylvain Guintoli	All

Key
Regular rider
Wildcard rider
Replacement rider

† Ilmor GP withdrew before Spanish race.

==== Mid-season changes ====
- On 15 March 2007, Mario Illien of Ilmor announced that the team would be taking a break from the MotoGP series as a result of funding issues.
- During practice for the Chinese GP, Olivier Jacque injured his arm in a crash and withdrew from the event. He missed his home race, at Le Mans, and was replaced by Fonsi Nieto.
- Team Roberts announced they expanded to a second bike from the Mugello race onwards, which was ridden by Kurtis Roberts.
- Kenny Roberts Jr. withdrew from the series in June. In those rounds the sole KR212V was ridden by his brother Kurtis.
- On 21 June, it was announced that Anthony West would be replacing Olivier Jacque at Kawasaki for the remainder of the season.
- During practice for the Dutch TT, Toni Elías broke his left femur. He was replaced by Michel Fabrizio at the German Grand Prix and Miguel Duhamel at the United States Grand Prix.
- During the first practice session at the US GP, Alex Hofmann broke a bone and sustained a soft tissue injury in his left hand in a collision with Sylvain Guintoli and he was unable to compete during the remainder of the weekend. Chaz Davies was invited to take his ride for the remainder of the weekend despite having no experience on any MotoGP bike or Bridgestone tyres. Hofmann was also sidelined from Czech GP, where Iván Silva replaced him.
- Shinichi Itoh rode as a replacement rider on a Pramac d'Antin Ducati after Alex Hofmann was released from the team following the Portuguese Grand Prix.

=== 250cc participants ===
Team	Constructor	Motorcycle	Tyre	No.	Rider	Rounds
Fortuna Aprilia	Aprilia	Aprilia RSA 250	D	1	(Spain) Jorge Lorenzo	1–10, 12–18
Aprilia Racing	Aprilia	Aprilia RSA 250	D	6	(Spain) Alex Debón	2, 7, 12, 18
Master MVA Aspar Team	Aprilia	Aprilia RSA 250	D	3	(San Marino) Alex de Angelis	1–10, 12–18
Master MVA Aspar Team	Aprilia	Aprilia RSA 250	D	19	(Spain) Álvaro Bautista	1–10, 12–18
Red Bull KTM 250	KTM	KTM 250 FRR	D	4	(Japan) Hiroshi Aoyama	1–10, 12–18
Red Bull KTM 250	KTM	KTM 250 FRR	D	36	(Finland) Mika Kallio	1–10, 12–18
Thai Honda PTT-SAG	Honda	Honda RS250R	D	8	(Thailand) Ratthapark Wilairot	1–10, 12–18
Blusens Aprilia Germany	Aprilia	Aprilia RSW 250	D	9	(Spain) Arturo Tizón	1–7
Blusens Aprilia Germany	Aprilia	Aprilia RSW 250	D	7	(Spain) Efrén Vázquez	8–10, 12–18
Blusens Aprilia Germany	Aprilia	Aprilia RSW 250	D	41	(Spain) Aleix Espargaró	1–10, 12–18
Team Toth Aprilia	Aprilia	Aprilia RSW 250	D	10	(Hungary) Imre Tóth	1–10, 12–18
Team Toth Aprilia	Aprilia	Aprilia RSA 250	D	80	(Spain) Héctor Barberá	1–10, 12–18
Emmi Caffe Latte	Aprilia	Aprilia RSA 250	D	12	(Switzerland) Thomas Lüthi	1–10, 12–18
Team Sicilia	Aprilia	Aprilia RSW 250	D	14	(Australia) Anthony West	1–7
Team Sicilia	Aprilia	Aprilia RSW 250	D	45	(United Kingdom) Dan Linfoot	8–10, 12–15
Team Sicilia	Aprilia	Aprilia RSW 250	D	21	(Italy) Federico Sandi	16–18
Squadra Corse Metis Gilera	Gilera	Gilera RSW 250 LE	D	15	(Italy) Roberto Locatelli	1–2, 5–10, 12–18
Squadra Corse Metis Gilera	Gilera	Gilera RSW 250 LE	D	58	(Italy) Marco Simoncelli	1–10, 12–18
Angaia Racing	Aprilia	Aprilia RSW 250	D	16	(France) Jules Cluzel	1–10, 12–18
Cardion AB Motoracing	Aprilia	Aprilia RSW 250	D	17	(Czech Republic) Karel Abraham	1–10, 12–18
Kiefer-Bos-Sotin Racing	Aprilia	Aprilia RSW 250	D	25	(Italy) Alex Baldolini	1–10, 12–18
Kiefer-Bos-Sotin Racing	Aprilia	Aprilia RSW 250	D	28	(Germany) Dirk Heidolf	1–10, 12–18
Campetella Racing	Aprilia	Aprilia RSW 250	D	32	(Italy) Fabrizio Lai	1–10, 12–18
Campetella Racing	Aprilia	Aprilia RSW 250	D	44	(Japan) Taro Sekiguchi	1–10, 12, 16–18
Humangest Racing Team 250cc Kopron Team Scot	Honda	Honda RS250RW	D	34	(Italy) Andrea Dovizioso	1–10, 12–18
Humangest Racing Team 250cc Kopron Team Scot	Honda	Honda RS250RW	D	55	(Japan) Yuki Takahashi	1–4, 6–10, 12–18
Honda LCR	Honda	Honda RS250R	D	50	(Republic of Ireland) Eugene Laverty	1–10, 12–18
Repsol Honda 250cc	Honda	Honda RS250RW	D	60	(Spain) Julián Simón	1–10, 12–18
Repsol Honda 250cc	Honda	Honda RS250RW	D	73	(Japan) Shuhei Aoyama	1–10, 12–18
Motorcycle Comp Service	Honda	Honda RS250R	D	18	(Germany) Joshua Sommer	10, 18
Burning Blood Racing	Honda	Honda RS250R	D	20	(Japan) Takumi Takahashi	15
Andalucia GFC MAS	Aprilia	Aprilia RSW 250	D	31	(Spain) Álvaro Molina	2, 7, 10, 14, 18
Yamaha Indonesia Pertamina RT	Yamaha	Yamaha TZ 250	D	35	(Indonesia) Doni Tata Pradita	17
AMC Schleizer Dreieck ADAC	Honda	Honda RS250R	D	38	(Germany) Thomas Walther	10
Postmus Racing	Yamaha	Yamaha TZ 250	D	49	(Netherlands) Erwin Postmus	9
Team Extremadura	Honda	Honda RS250R	D	53	(Spain) Santiago Barragán	2, 7, 14, 18
Yes! Yamaha Tianjian	Yamaha	Yamaha TZ 250	D	62	(China) Shi Zhao Huang	4
Yes! Yamaha Tianjian	Yamaha	Yamaha TZ 250	D	63	(China) Xiao Jin	4
VET Racing	Aprilia	Aprilia RSW 250	D	64	(Italy) Omar Menghi	6, 13
History Racing TZ Club Italia	Yamaha	Yamaha TZ 250	D	65	(Italy) Thomas Tallevi	6
De Arend Racing	Aprilia	Aprilia RSW 250	D	68	(Netherlands) Randy Gevers	9
Maro Racing	Honda	Honda RS250R	D	69	(Netherlands) Ronald Beitler	9
MRTT Hagen Racing	Honda	Honda RS250R	D	70	(Netherlands) Mike Velthuijzen	9
Jaap Kingma	Aprilia	Aprilia RSW 250	D	72	(Netherlands) Hans Smees	9
Malossi & Spruce & Pro-Tec	Yamaha	Yamaha TZ 250	D	75	(Japan) Youichi Ui	15
Will Access With Plus Myu	Yamaha	Yamaha TZ 250	D	76	(Japan) Seijin Oikawa	15
TEC-2 & Kyushukyoritsu Univ.	Yamaha	Yamaha TZ 250	D	77	(Japan) Yuki Hamamoto	15
BM Groundworks	Yamaha	Yamaha TZ 250	D	81	(United Kingdom) Toby Markham	8
St Neot's Motorcycle Co	Yamaha	Yamaha TZ 250	D	82	(United Kingdom) Andrew Sawford	8
Dennis Trollope Racing	Yamaha	Yamaha TZ 250	D	83	(United Kingdom) Alex Kenchington	8
TNT Express Team Fila	Honda	Honda RS250R	D	84	(United Kingdom) Luke Lawrence	8
Team McDonald's	Aprilia	Aprilia RSW 250	D	84	(United Kingdom) Luke Lawrence	14
Klub Racing Team Mayer	Honda	Honda RS250R	D	87	(Czech Republic) Jiri Mayer	12
Zongshen Team Of China	Aprilia	Aprilia RSW 250	D	88	(China) Zhu Wang	12, 14
Zongshen Team Of China	Aprilia	Aprilia RSW 250	D	89	(China) Chow Ho-Wan	12, 14, 16

Key
Regular rider
Wildcard rider
Replacement rider

==== Mid-season changes ====
- Roberto Locatelli was seriously injured in a practise session crash at the Spanish GP weekend. Gilera didn't replace him and Locatelli returned to the series in the French GP.
- As a result of a crash in qualifying in China, Yuki Takahashi broke his left arm and missed the French GP, which he won in 2006. He was not replaced for the event.
- Starting from the French GP, Humangest Racing was officially called Kopron Team Scot.
- Following Anthony West's step up to the Moto GP class with Kawasaki, Dan Linfoot was signed to replace him from the Donington Park round. Also, Arturo Tizón was sacked by his team and replaced by Efrén Vázquez.
- Federico Sandi replaced Dan Linfoot from Australian GP onwards.
- Taro Sekiguchi missed couple of rounds after being injured in Czech Republic Grand Prix. Having had many injuries during the last couple of seasons, he decided to change his race number in his return, in the Australian Grand Prix.

=== 125cc participants ===
Team	Constructor	Motorcycle	Tyre	No.	Rider	Rounds
Polaris World	Aprilia	Aprilia RS 125 R	D	6	(Spain) Joan Olivé	1–10, 12–18
Polaris World	Aprilia	Aprilia RSA 125	D	75	(Italy) Mattia Pasini	1–10, 12–18
FFM Honda GP 125	Honda	Honda RS125R	D	7	(France) Alexis Masbou	1–10, 12–18
FFM Honda GP 125	Honda	Honda RS125R	D	36	(France) Cyril Carrillo	17
FFM Honda GP 125	Honda	Honda RS125R	D	62	(France) Louis Rossi	14
Team Sicilia	Aprilia	Aprilia RS 125 R	D	8	(Italy) Lorenzo Zanetti	1–10, 12–18
Team Sicilia	Aprilia	Aprilia RS 125 R	D	20	(Italy) Roberto Tamburini	1–10, 12–18
Emmi Caffe Latte	Aprilia	Aprilia RS 125 R	D	11	(Germany) Sandro Cortese	1–10, 12–18
Repsol Honda 125cc	Honda	Honda RS125R	D	12	(Spain) Esteve Rabat	1–5, 7–10, 12–18
Repsol Honda 125cc	Honda	Honda RS125R	D	38	(United Kingdom) Bradley Smith	1–10, 12–18
Bancaja Aspar	Aprilia	Aprilia RS 125 R	D	14	(Hungary) Gábor Talmácsi	1–10, 12–18
Bancaja Aspar	Aprilia	Aprilia RSA 125	D	33	(Spain) Sergio Gadea	1–10, 12–18
Bancaja Aspar	Aprilia	Aprilia RSA 125	D	55	(Spain) Héctor Faubel	1–10, 12–18
Skilled ISPA Racing Team	Aprilia	Aprilia RS 125 R	D	15	(Italy) Federico Sandi	1–10, 12–15
Skilled ISPA Racing Team	Aprilia	Aprilia RS 125 R	D	24	(Italy) Simone Corsi	1–10, 12–18
Skilled ISPA Racing Team	Aprilia	Aprilia RS 125 R	D	79	(Italy) Ferruccio Lamborghini	16–18
Valsir Seedorf Derbi	Derbi	Derbi RS 125 R	D	18	(Spain) Nicolás Terol	1–10, 12–18
Valsir Seedorf Derbi	Derbi	Derbi RS 125 R	D	52	(Czech Republic) Lukáš Pešek	1–10, 12–18
Blusens Aprilia	Aprilia	Aprilia RS 125 R	D	22	(Spain) Pablo Nieto	1–10, 12–18
Blusens Aprilia	Aprilia	Aprilia RS 125 R	D	56	(Netherlands) Hugo van den Berg	1–10, 12–13
Blusens Aprilia Germany	Aprilia	Aprilia RS 125 R	D	17	(Germany) Stefan Bradl	7, 9–10, 13–18
WTR Blauer USA	Aprilia	Aprilia RS 125 R	D	27	(Italy) Stefano Bianco	1–6, 8–10, 12–15, 17–18
WTR Blauer USA	Aprilia	Aprilia RS 125 R	D	29	(Italy) Andrea Iannone	1–10, 12–18
WTR Blauer USA	Aprilia	Aprilia RS 125 R	D	68	(Australia) Glenn Scott	16
Red Bull KTM 125	KTM	KTM 125 FRR	D	34	(Switzerland) Randy Krummenacher	1–10, 12–18
Red Bull KTM 125	KTM	KTM 125 FRR	D	51	(United States) Stevie Bonsey	1–10, 12–18
Red Bull KTM 125	KTM	KTM 125 FRR	D	71	(Japan) Tomoyoshi Koyama	1–10, 12–18
Multimedia Racing	Aprilia	Aprilia RS 125 R	D	35	(Italy) Raffaele De Rosa	1–10, 12–18
Multimedia Racing	Aprilia	Aprilia RS 125 R	D	53	(Italy) Simone Grotzkyj	1–8, 10, 12–18
Multimedia Racing	Aprilia	Aprilia RS 125 R	D	77	(Switzerland) Dominique Aegerter	1–10, 12–18
Arie Molenaar Racing	Honda	Honda RS125R	D	37	(Netherlands) Joey Litjens	1–10, 12–14, 16–18
Arie Molenaar Racing	Honda	Honda RS125R	D	99	(United Kingdom) Danny Webb	1–10, 12–18
Belson Campetella Racing	Aprilia	Aprilia RS 125 R	D	44	(Spain) Pol Espargaró	1–10, 12–18
Ajo Motorsport	Derbi	Derbi RS 125 R	D	60	(Austria) Michael Ranseder	1–10, 12–18
Ajo Motorsport	Derbi	Derbi RS 125 R	D	95	(Romania) Robert Mureșan	1–10, 12–18
Humangest Racing Team 125cc Kopron Team Scot	Honda	Honda RS125R	D	63	(France) Mike Di Meglio	1–2, 4–10, 12–18
Humangest Racing Team 125cc Kopron Team Scot	Honda	Honda RS125R	D	76	(Italy) Stefano Musco	1
Humangest Racing Team 125cc Kopron Team Scot	Honda	Honda RS125R	D	13	(Italy) Dino Lombardi	2–6, 10, 12–18
Humangest Racing Team 125cc Kopron Team Scot	Honda	Honda RS125R	D	31	(Spain) Enrique Jerez	8–9
Humangest Racing Team 125cc Kopron Team Scot	Honda	Honda RS125R	D	54	(United Kingdom) Kev Coghlan	3
FMCV Team Machado	Aprilia	Aprilia RS 125 R	D	30	(Spain) Pere Tutusaus	2, 7, 14, 18
Cemelog-Hanusch	Honda	Honda RS125R	D	39	(Hungary) Nikolett Kovács	3
Superbike Gyorsasagi MSE	Aprilia	Aprilia RS 125 R	D	40	(Hungary) Alen Győrfi	3, 18
ADAC Nordbayern EV	Aprilia	Aprilia RS 125 R	D	41	(Germany) Tobias Siegert	3, 6
RCGM Team	Aprilia	Aprilia RS 125 R	D	42	(Italy) Simone Sancioni	6, 13
Équipe de France Espoir	Honda	Honda RS125R	D	45	(France) Valentin Debise	5
TVX Racing - TJP	Honda	Honda RS125R	D	46	(France) Romain Maitre	5
Villiers Team Competition	Honda	Honda RS125R	D	47	(France) Steven Le Coquen	5
Villiers Team Competition	Honda	Honda RS125R	D	48	(France) Julien Cartron	5
Bretagne Organisation Sport	Honda	Honda RS125R	D	49	(France) Gwen Le Badezet	5
IKI Racing	Honda	Honda RS125R	D	54	(United Kingdom) Kev Coghlan	8
Metallico 18 Garage	Honda	Honda RS125R	D	57	(Japan) Yuuichi Yanagisawa	15
Project Muy FRS	Honda	Honda RS125R	D	58	(Japan) Shoya Tomizawa	15
Honda Suzuka Racing	Honda	Honda RS125R	D	59	(Japan) Iori Namihira	15
SGM Racing	Aprilia	Aprilia RS 125 R	D	61	(Portugal) Ivo Relvas	14
Abbink Bos Racing	Honda	Honda RS125R	B	64	(Germany) Georg Fröhlich	10
Abbink Bos Racing	Honda	Honda RS125R	D	89	(Netherlands) Jasper Iwema	9
Sachsenring Motorrad Unger	Aprilia	Aprilia RS 125 R	D	65	(Germany) Eric Hübsch	10
Sachsenring Motorrad Unger	Aprilia	Aprilia RS 125 R	D	66	(Germany) Patrick Unger	10
Adac Sachsen Junior Team	Honda	Honda RS125R	D	67	(Germany) Sebastian Eckner	10
TEC-2 & Ogiya	Yamaha	Yamaha TZ125	D	69	(Japan) Nayuta Mizuno	15
Leigh-Smith Racing	Honda	Honda RS125R	D	70	(Australia) Blake Leigh-Smith	16
Lemstra Racing	Honda	Honda RS125R	D	72	(Netherlands) Patrick van de Waarsenburg	9
Leigh-Smith Racing	Honda	Honda RS125R	D	73	(Australia) Jackson Leigh-Smith	16
Dydo Miu Racing	Honda	Honda RS125R	D	74	(Japan) Kazuma Watanabe	15
Matteoni Racing	Honda	Honda RS125R	D	76	(Spain) Iván Maestro	2, 7
Ascat. Madrid Team	Honda	Honda RS125R	D	76	(Spain) Iván Maestro	18
Quinto Almoradi	Aprilia	Aprilia RS 125 R	D	78	(Spain) Daniel Sáez	2, 18
Junior GP Racing Team	Aprilia	Aprilia RS 125 R	D	79	(Italy) Ferruccio Lamborghini	13
Friba	Friba	Friba	D	80	(Italy) Federico Biaggi	13
KRP	Honda	Honda RS125R	D	81	(United Kingdom) Tom Hayward	8
KRP	Honda	Honda RS125R	D	83	(United Kingdom) Nikki Coates	8
KRP	Honda	Honda RS125R	D	84	(United Kingdom) Robbie Stewart	8
SP12/KGD Racing	Honda	Honda RS125R	D	82	(United Kingdom) Luke Jones	8
Wintex Racing Austria	Honda	Honda RS125R	D	85	(Austria) Philipp Eitzinger	7, 9
Racc Aprilia	Aprilia	Aprilia RS 125 R	D	86	(Spain) Ricard Cardús	12, 14
MC Terzo Bandini	Aprilia	Aprilia RS 125 R	D	87	(Italy) Roberto Lacalendola	6
Ellegi Racing	Aprilia	Aprilia RS 125 R	D	87	(Italy) Roberto Lacalendola	13
Motorsportklazienaveen	Honda	Honda RS125R	D	88	(Netherlands) Ferry Stoffer	9
Cool Rental Racing TH	Aprilia	Aprilia RS 125 R	D	90	(Netherlands) Roy Pouw	9
FGR 07 Team	FGR	FGR	D	91	(Czech Republic) Karel Májek	12
Intermoto Czech	Aprilia	Aprilia RS 125 R	D	92	(Czech Republic) Karel Pešek	12
Rohac & Fetja	Honda	Honda RS125R	D	93	(Czech Republic) Michal Prášek	12
Honda Schumann Reisen	Honda	Honda RS125R	D	94	(Germany) Toni Wirsing	12
Rhys Moller Racing	Honda	Honda RS125R	D	96	(Australia) Rhys Moller	16
Red Bull MotoGP Academy	Honda	Honda RS125R	D	98	(Japan) Takaaki Nakagami	18

Key
Regular rider
Wildcard rider
Replacement rider

==== Mid-season changes ====
- Fontana Racing was called Skilled Racing Team before the season started following the withdrawal of their sponsor ISPA for Team Sicilia.
- Stefano Musco missed the Qatar and Spanish GPs through injury and was replaced by Dino Lombardi. Later Lombardi replaced Musco on a regular basis.
- Mike Di Meglio sustained a broken collarbone in a crash in qualifying for the Spanish GP and was told by doctors to allow more time to recover. He was replaced at the Turkish GP by Kev Coghlan, who had been originally on the 250cc entry list prior to the withdrawal of his team, Winona Racing.
- Starting from the French GP, Scot Racing Team was officially called Kopron Team Scot.
- At the British GP, Enrique Jerez replaced Dino Lombardi.
- From Portuguese GP onwards, Stefan Bradl replaced Hugo van den Berg on regular basis.
- Following Federico Sandi's move to 250cc class, Ferruccio Lamborghini replaced him in Skilled Racing Team, starting from Australian Grand Prix.
- Glenn Scott replaced Stefano Bianco in Australian Grand Prix.

== Standings ==
=== MotoGP standings ===
Scoring system

Points were awarded to the top fifteen finishers. Rider had to finish the race to earn points.

Position	**1st**	**2nd**	**3rd**	**4th**	**5th**	**6th**	**7th**	**8th**	**9th**	**10th**	**11th**	**12th**	**13th**	**14th**	**15th**
Points	25	20	16	13	11	10	9	8	7	6	5	4	3	2	1

==== Riders' standings ====
- Rounds marked with a light blue background were under wet race conditions or stopped by rain.
- Riders marked with light blue background were eligible for Rookie of the Year awards.

Pos	Rider	Bike	Team	QAT (Qatar)	SPA (Spain)	TUR (Turkey)	CHN (China)	FRA (France)	ITA (Italy)	CAT (Catalonia)	GBR (United Kingdom)	NED (Netherlands)	GER (Germany)	USA (United States)	CZE (Czech Republic)	SMR (San Marino)	POR (Portugal)	JPN (Japan)	AUS (Australia)	MAL (Malaysia)	VAL (Valencian Community)	Pts
1	(Australia) Casey Stoner	Ducati	Ducati Marlboro Team	1	5	1	1	3	**4**	1	1	2	**5**	**1**	**1**	**1**	3	6	1	1	2	367
2	(Spain) Dani Pedrosa	Honda	Repsol Honda Team	3	**2**	Ret	4	4	2	3	8	4	1	5	4	Ret	2	**Ret**	**4**	**3**	**1**	242
3	(Italy) Valentino Rossi	Yamaha	Fiat Yamaha Team	**2**	1	**10**	**2**	6	1	**2**	4	1	Ret	4	7	Ret	1	13	3	5	Ret	241
4	(United States) John Hopkins	Suzuki	Rizla Suzuki MotoGP	4	19	6	3	7	5	4	5	5	7	15	2	3	6	10	7	8	3	189
5	(Italy) Marco Melandri	Honda	Honda Gresini	5	8	5	5	2	9	9	10	10	6	3	WD	4	5	5	10	2	4	187
6	(Australia) Chris Vermeulen	Suzuki	Rizla Suzuki MotoGP	7	9	11	7	1	8	7	3	**16**	11	2	5	2	13	11	8	7	6	179
7	(Italy) Loris Capirossi	Ducati	Ducati Marlboro Team	Ret	12	3	6	8	7	6	Ret	Ret	2	Ret	6	5	9	1	2	11	5	166
8	(United States) Nicky Hayden	Honda	Repsol Honda Team	8	7	7	12	Ret	10	11	17	3	3	Ret	3	13	**4**	9	Ret	9	8	127
9	(United States) Colin Edwards	Yamaha	Fiat Yamaha Team	6	3	Ret	11	**12**	12	10	**2**	6	4	11	Ret	9	10	14	9	10	13	124
10	(Brazil) Alex Barros	Ducati	Pramac d'Antin	9	11	4	14	Ret	3	8	7	7	Ret	9	9	Ret	Ret	8	5	12	7	115
11	(France) Randy de Puniet	Kawasaki	Kawasaki Racing Team	Ret	13	8	8	Ret	Ret	5	6	Ret	Ret	6	8	Ret	Ret	2	6	4	9	108
12	(Spain) Toni Elías	Honda	Honda Gresini	14	4	2	Ret	Ret	6	Ret	12	WD			11	7	8	3	15	6	10	104
13	(Germany) Alex Hofmann	Ducati	Pramac d'Antin	11	DSQ	9	9	5	11	13	9	8	9	WD		11	Ret					65
14	(Spain) Carlos Checa	Honda	Honda LCR	Ret	6	12	10	Ret	Ret	17	Ret	11	14	14	10	6	7	18	11	14	12	65
15	(Australia) Anthony West	Kawasaki	Kawasaki Racing Team								11	9	8	7	12	8	12	7	12	15	16	59
16	(France) Sylvain Guintoli	Yamaha	Dunlop Yamaha Tech 3	15	15	15	13	10	14	14	16	14	Ret	13	13	12	14	4	14	19	11	50
17	(Japan) Shinya Nakano	Honda	Konica Minolta Honda	10	10	13	Ret	Ret	13	15	14	12	Ret	12	14	10	11	16	13	16	14	47
18	(Japan) Makoto Tamada	Yamaha	Dunlop Yamaha Tech 3	16	14	14	Ret	9	15	12	15	13	13	8	17	14	Ret	12	16	18	15	38
19	(United States) Kurtis Roberts	KR212V	Team Roberts						Ret	18	13	15	12	Ret	15	15	Ret	Ret	17	20	Ret	10
20	(United States) Roger Lee Hayden	Kawasaki	Kawasaki Racing Team											10								6
21	(Italy) Michel Fabrizio	Honda	Honda Gresini										10									6
22	(Spain) Fonsi Nieto	Kawasaki	Kawasaki Racing Team					11														5
23	(France) Olivier Jacque	Kawasaki	Kawasaki Racing Team	12	18	Ret	WD		16	WD												4
24	(United States) Kenny Roberts Jr.	KR212V	Team Roberts	13	16	16	15	Ret	17	16												4
25	(Japan) Nobuatsu Aoki	Suzuki	Rizla Suzuki MotoGP																	13		3
26	(Japan) Shinichi Ito	Ducati	Pramac d'Antin															15				1
	(United Kingdom) Chaz Davies	Ducati	Pramac d'Antin											16					Ret	17	DNS	0
	(Spain) Iván Silva	Ducati	Pramac d'Antin												16							0
	(Japan) Kousuke Akiyoshi	Suzuki	Rizla Suzuki MotoGP		17													Ret				0
	(Japan) Akira Yanagawa	Kawasaki	Kawasaki Racing Team															17				0
	(Canada) Miguel Duhamel	Honda	Honda Gresini											Ret								0
	(Australia) Andrew Pitt	Ilmor GP	Ilmor GP	Ret																		0
	(United Kingdom) Jeremy McWilliams	Ilmor GP	Ilmor GP	DNS																		0
Pos	Rider	Bike	Team	QAT (Qatar)	SPA (Spain)	TUR (Turkey)	CHN (China)	FRA (France)	ITA (Italy)	CAT (Catalonia)	GBR (United Kingdom)	NED (Netherlands)	GER (Germany)	USA (United States)	CZE (Czech Republic)	SMR (San Marino)	POR (Portugal)	JPN (Japan)	AUS (Australia)	MAL (Malaysia)	VAL (Valencian Community)	Pts

Colour	Result
Gold	Winner
Silver	Second place
Bronze	Third place
Green	Points classification
Blue	Non-points classification
Blue	Non-classified finish (NC)
Purple	Retired, not classified (Ret)
Red	Did not qualify (DNQ)
Red	Did not pre-qualify (DNPQ)
Black	Disqualified (DSQ)
White	Did not start (DNS)
White	Withdrew (WD)
White	Race cancelled (C)
Blank	Did not practice (DNP)
Blank	Did not arrive (DNA)
Blank	Excluded (EX)

**Bold** – Pole position
Italics – Fastest lap

==== Constructors' standings ====
- Each constructor got the same number of points as their best placed rider in each race.
- Rounds marked with a light blue background were under wet race conditions or stopped by rain.

Pos	Constructor	QAT (Qatar)	SPA (Spain)	TUR (Turkey)	CHN (China)	FRA (France)	ITA (Italy)	CAT (Catalonia)	GBR (United Kingdom)	NED (Netherlands)	GER (Germany)	USA (United States)	CZE (Czech Republic)	SMR (San Marino)	POR (Portugal)	JPN (Japan)	AUS (Australia)	MAL (Malaysia)	VAL (Valencian Community)	Pts
1	(Italy) Ducati	1	5	1	1	3	3	1	1	2	2	1	1	1	3	1	1	1	2	394
2	(Japan) Honda	3	2	2	4	2	2	3	8	3	1	3	3	4	2	3	4	2	1	313
3	(Japan) Yamaha	2	1	10	2	6	1	2	2	1	4	4	7	9	1	4	3	5	11	283
4	(Japan) Suzuki	4	9	6	3	1	5	4	3	5	7	2	2	2	6	10	7	7	3	241
5	(Japan) Kawasaki	12	13	8	8	11	16	5	6	9	8	6	8	8	12	2	6	4	9	144
6	(United States) KR212V	13	16	16	15	Ret	17	16	13	15	12	Ret	15	15	Ret	Ret	17	20	Ret	14
	(United Kingdom) Ilmor GP	Ret																		0
Pos	Constructor	QAT (Qatar)	SPA (Spain)	TUR (Turkey)	CHN (China)	FRA (France)	ITA (Italy)	CAT (Catalonia)	GBR (United Kingdom)	NED (Netherlands)	GER (Germany)	USA (United States)	CZE (Czech Republic)	SMR (San Marino)	POR (Portugal)	JPN (Japan)	AUS (Australia)	MAL (Malaysia)	VAL (Valencian Community)	Pts

==== Teams' standings ====
- Each team got the total points scored by their two riders, including replacement riders. In one rider team, only the points scored by that rider was counted. Wildcard riders did not score points.
- Rounds marked with a light blue background were under wet race conditions or stopped by rain.

Pos	Team	Bike No.	QAT (Qatar)	SPA (Spain)	TUR (Turkey)	CHN (China)	FRA (France)	ITA (Italy)	CAT (Catalonia)	GBR (United Kingdom)	NED (Netherlands)	GER (Germany)	USA (United States)	CZE (Czech Republic)	SMR (San Marino)	POR (Portugal)	JPN (Japan)	AUS (Australia)	MAL (Malaysia)	VAL (Valencian Community)	Pts
1	(Italy) Ducati Marlboro Team	27	1	5	1	1	3	**4**	1	1	2	**5**	**1**	**1**	**1**	3	6	1	1	2	533
1	(Italy) Ducati Marlboro Team	65	Ret	12	3	6	8	7	6	Ret	Ret	2	Ret	6	5	9	1	2	11	5	533
2	(Japan) Repsol Honda Team	1	8	7	7	12	Ret	10	11	17	3	3	Ret	3	13	**4**	9	Ret	9	8	369
2	(Japan) Repsol Honda Team	26	3	**2**	Ret	4	4	2	3	8	4	1	5	4	Ret	2	**Ret**	**4**	**3**	**1**	369
3	(Japan) Rizla Suzuki MotoGP	21	4	19	6	3	7	5	4	5	5	7	15	2	3	6	10	7	8	3	368
3	(Japan) Rizla Suzuki MotoGP	71	7	9	11	7	1	8	7	3	**16**	11	2	5	2	13	11	8	7	6	368
4	(Japan) Fiat Yamaha Team	5	6	3	Ret	11	**12**	12	10	**2**	6	4	11	Ret	9	10	14	9	10	13	365
4	(Japan) Fiat Yamaha Team	46	**2**	1	**10**	**2**	6	1	**2**	4	1	Ret	4	7	Ret	1	13	3	5	Ret	365
5	(Italy) Honda Gresini	17											Ret								297
5	(Italy) Honda Gresini	24	14	4	2	Ret	Ret	6	Ret	12	WD			11	7	8	3	15	6	10	297
5	(Italy) Honda Gresini	33	5	8	5	5	2	9	9	10	10	6	3	WD	4	5	5	10	2	4	297
5	(Italy) Honda Gresini	84										10									297
6	(Italy) Pramac d'Antin	4	9	11	4	14	Ret	3	8	7	7	Ret	9	9	Ret	Ret	8	5	12	7	181
6	(Italy) Pramac d'Antin	22												16							181
6	(Italy) Pramac d'Antin	57											16					Ret	17	DNS	181
6	(Italy) Pramac d'Antin	66	11	DSQ	9	9	5	11	13	9	8	9	WD		11	Ret					181
6	(Italy) Pramac d'Antin	72															15				181
7	(Japan) Kawasaki Racing Team	11					11														176
7	(Japan) Kawasaki Racing Team	13								11	9	8	7	12	8	12	7	12	15	16	176
7	(Japan) Kawasaki Racing Team	14	Ret	13	8	8	Ret	Ret	5	6	Ret	Ret	6	8	Ret	Ret	2	6	4	9	176
7	(Japan) Kawasaki Racing Team	19	12	18	Ret	WD		16	WD												176
8	(France) Dunlop Yamaha Tech 3	6	16	14	14	Ret	9	15	12	15	13	13	8	17	14	Ret	12	16	18	15	88
8	(France) Dunlop Yamaha Tech 3	50	15	15	15	13	10	14	14	16	14	Ret	13	13	12	14	4	14	19	11	88
9	(Monaco) Honda LCR	7	Ret	6	12	10	Ret	Ret	17	Ret	11	14	14	10	6	7	18	11	14	12	65
10	(Monaco) Konica Minolta Honda	56	10	10	13	Ret	Ret	13	15	14	12	Ret	12	14	10	11	16	13	16	14	47
11	(United States) Team Roberts	10	13	16	16	15	Ret	17	16												14
11	(United States) Team Roberts	80								13	15	12	Ret	15	15	Ret	Ret	17	20	Ret	14
	(United Kingdom) Ilmor GP	88	Ret																		0
	(United Kingdom) Ilmor GP	99	DNS																		0
Pos	Team	Bike No.	QAT (Qatar)	SPA (Spain)	TUR (Turkey)	CHN (China)	FRA (France)	ITA (Italy)	CAT (Catalonia)	GBR (United Kingdom)	NED (Netherlands)	GER (Germany)	USA (United States)	CZE (Czech Republic)	SMR (San Marino)	POR (Portugal)	JPN (Japan)	AUS (Australia)	MAL (Malaysia)	VAL (Valencian Community)	Pts

=== 250cc standings ===
Scoring system

Points were awarded to the top fifteen finishers. Rider had to finish the race to earn points.

Position	**1st**	**2nd**	**3rd**	**4th**	**5th**	**6th**	**7th**	**8th**	**9th**	**10th**	**11th**	**12th**	**13th**	**14th**	**15th**
Points	25	20	16	13	11	10	9	8	7	6	5	4	3	2	1

==== Riders' standings ====
- Rounds marked with a light blue background were under wet race conditions or stopped by rain.
- Riders marked with light blue background were eligible for Rookie of the Year awards.

Pos	Rider	Bike	QAT (Qatar)	SPA (Spain)	TUR (Turkey)	CHN (China)	FRA (France)	ITA (Italy)	CAT (Catalonia)	GBR (United Kingdom)	NED (Netherlands)	GER (Germany)	CZE (Czech Republic)	SMR (San Marino)	POR (Portugal)	JPN (Japan)	AUS (Australia)	MAL (Malaysia)	VAL (Valencian Community)	Pts
1	(Spain) Jorge Lorenzo	Aprilia	**1**	**1**	2	**1**	**1**	8	**1**	Ret	**1**	4	**1**	**1**	3	11	**1**	3	7	312
2	(Italy) Andrea Dovizioso	Honda	5	3	**1**	3	2	4	3	1	4	5	2	Ret	**2**	2	3	11	4	260
3	(San Marino) Alex de Angelis	Aprilia	2	4	4	4	3	2	2	**2**	2	3	11	5	6	5	9	Ret	2	235
4	(Spain) Álvaro Bautista	Aprilia	Ret	2	3	2	8	**1**	5	Ret	3	17	5	8	1	15	2	Ret	Ret	181
5	(Spain) Héctor Barberá	Aprilia	3	Ret	8	6	4	3	8	Ret	7	6	4	3	5	3	Ret	2	5	177
6	(Japan) Hiroshi Aoyama	KTM	Ret	6	Ret	9	Ret	21	7	3	5	1	6	2	Ret	8	4	**1**	10	160
7	(Finland) Mika Kallio	KTM	Ret	Ret	6	5	7	Ret	6	6	8	**2**	3	Ret	Ret	1	Ret	4	**1**	157
8	(Switzerland) Thomas Lüthi	Aprilia	4	Ret	5	8	Ret	5	4	Ret	Ret	9	7	4	4	10	5	5	9	133
9	(Spain) Julián Simón	Honda	8	Ret	7	7	5	7	10	7	Ret	Ret	8	10	8	6	6	6	6	123
10	(Italy) Marco Simoncelli	Gilera	9	Ret	9	Ret	6	9	9	Ret	6	7	Ret	Ret	7	7	7	8	11	97
11	(Japan) Yuki Takahashi	Honda	7	8	Ret	DNS		11	Ret	4	10	8	Ret	9	Ret	4	10	9	9	90
12	(Japan) Shuhei Aoyama	Honda	10	7	16	Ret	9	6	11	5	13	12	9	6	Ret	**9**	8	13	17	90
13	(Italy) Roberto Locatelli	Gilera	6	DNS			DNS	18	12	Ret	9	10	10	7	Ret	16	11	7	13	59
14	(Italy) Fabrizio Lai	Aprilia	12	11	10	10	12	13	Ret	11	11	18	12	Ret	9	Ret	17	20	Ret	49
15	(Spain) Aleix Espargaró	Aprilia	11	Ret	11	11	18	12	20	Ret	17	11	13	12	12	17	14	10	12	47
16	(Czech Republic) Karel Abraham	Aprilia	Ret	15	12	Ret	Ret	16	14	10	15	Ret	14	14	10	Ret	13	12	Ret	31
17	(Thailand) Ratthapark Wilairot	Honda	14	12	15	12	11	Ret	17	8	14	19	16	13	Ret	Ret	19	16	15	30
18	(Spain) Alex Debón	Aprilia		5					16				Ret						3	27
19	(Australia) Anthony West	Aprilia	13	9	Ret	13	10	10	21											25
20	(Germany) Dirk Heidolf	Aprilia	15	10	13	Ret	16	17	Ret	12	16	13	17	Ret	11	Ret	15	15	16	24
21	(France) Jules Cluzel	Aprilia	16	16	Ret	16	Ret	19	13	Ret	20	15	18	11	13	13	12	19	Ret	19
22	(Italy) Alex Baldolini	Aprilia	17	13	14	Ret	13	14	18	14	19	14	Ret	Ret	Ret	Ret	Ret	14	14	18
23	(Japan) Taro Sekiguchi	Aprilia	Ret	17	Ret	14	14	15	15	13	12	16	DNS				18	18	19	13
24	(United Kingdom) Dan Linfoot	Aprilia								9	Ret	Ret	20	Ret	Ret	Ret				7
25	(Republic of Ireland) Eugene Laverty	Honda	18	14	17	17	15	20	19	Ret	21	Ret	Ret	15	14	19	16	17	21	6
26	(Japan) Seijin Oikawa	Yamaha														12				4
27	(Japan) Youichi Ui	Yamaha														14				2
28	(Hungary) Imre Tóth	Aprilia	19	18	Ret	18	Ret	22	22	15	22	Ret	19	17	15	18	Ret	21	23	2
29	(Spain) Efrén Vázquez	Aprilia								16	18	Ret	15	16	Ret	Ret	Ret	Ret	18	1
30	(Spain) Arturo Tizón	Aprilia	Ret	Ret	Ret	15	17	23	DNS											1
	(Spain) Álvaro Molina	Aprilia		Ret					23			Ret			16				22	0
	(China) Ho Wan Chow	Aprilia											DNQ		17		Ret			0
	(United Kingdom) Toby Markham	Yamaha								17										0
	(Italy) Omar Menghi	Aprilia						Ret						18						0
	(China) Jin Xiao	Yamaha				19														0
	(Italy) Federico Sandi	Aprilia															20	Ret	20	0
	(Japan) Yuki Hamamoto	Yamaha														20				0
	(Netherlands) Ronald Beitler	Honda									23									0
	(Spain) Santiago Barragán	Honda		Ret					DNQ						DNQ				24	0
	(Netherlands) Randy Gevers	Aprilia									24									0
	(Italy) Thomas Tallevi	Yamaha						24												0
	(Germany) Joshua Sommer	Honda										Ret							Ret	0
	(Indonesia) Doni Tata Pradita	Yamaha																Ret		0
	(Japan) Takumi Takahashi	Honda														Ret				0
	(Germany) Thomas Walther	Honda										Ret								0
	(Netherlands) Hans Smees	Aprilia									Ret									0
	(China) Shi Zhao Huang	Yamaha				DNS														0
	(China) Zhu Wang	Aprilia											DNQ		DNQ					0
	(United Kingdom) Luke Lawrence	Honda								DNQ										0
	(United Kingdom) Luke Lawrence	Aprilia													DNQ					0
	(Czech Republic) Jiří Mayer	Honda											DNQ							0
	(Netherlands) Mike Velthuijzen	Honda									DNQ									0
	(United Kingdom) Andrew Sawford	Yamaha								DNQ										0
	(United Kingdom) Alex Kenchington	Yamaha								DNQ										0
Pos	Rider	Bike	QAT (Qatar)	SPA (Spain)	TUR (Turkey)	CHN (China)	FRA (France)	ITA (Italy)	CAT (Catalonia)	GBR (United Kingdom)	NED (Netherlands)	GER (Germany)	CZE (Czech Republic)	SMR (San Marino)	POR (Portugal)	JPN (Japan)	AUS (Australia)	MAL (Malaysia)	VAL (Valencian Community)	Pts

Colour	Result
Gold	Winner
Silver	Second place
Bronze	Third place
Green	Points classification
Blue	Non-points classification
Blue	Non-classified finish (NC)
Purple	Retired, not classified (Ret)
Red	Did not qualify (DNQ)
Red	Did not pre-qualify (DNPQ)
Black	Disqualified (DSQ)
White	Did not start (DNS)
White	Withdrew (WD)
White	Race cancelled (C)
Blank	Did not practice (DNP)
Blank	Did not arrive (DNA)
Blank	Excluded (EX)

**Bold** – Pole position
Italics – Fastest lap

==== Constructors' standings ====
- Each constructor got the same number of points as their best placed rider in each race.
- Rounds marked with a light blue background were under wet race conditions or stopped by rain.

Pos	Constructor	QAT (Qatar)	SPA (Spain)	TUR (Turkey)	CHN (China)	FRA (France)	ITA (Italy)	CAT (Catalonia)	GBR (United Kingdom)	NED (Netherlands)	GER (Germany)	CZE (Czech Republic)	SMR (San Marino)	POR (Portugal)	JPN (Japan)	AUS (Australia)	MAL (Malaysia)	VAL (Valencian Community)	Pts
1	(Italy) Aprilia	1	1	2	1	1	1	1	2	1	3	1	1	1	3	1	2	2	387
2	(Japan) Honda	5	3	1	3	2	4	3	1	4	5	2	6	2	2	3	6	4	275
3	(Austria) KTM	Ret	6	6	5	7	21	6	3	5	1	3	2	Ret	1	4	1	1	226
4	(Italy) Gilera	6	Ret	9	Ret	6	9	9	Ret	6	7	10	7	7	7	7	7	11	116
5	(Japan) Yamaha				19		24		17						12		Ret		4
Pos	Constructor	QAT (Qatar)	SPA (Spain)	TUR (Turkey)	CHN (China)	FRA (France)	ITA (Italy)	CAT (Catalonia)	GBR (United Kingdom)	NED (Netherlands)	GER (Germany)	CZE (Czech Republic)	SMR (San Marino)	POR (Portugal)	JPN (Japan)	AUS (Australia)	MAL (Malaysia)	VAL (Valencian Community)	Pts

=== 125cc standings ===
Scoring system

Points were awarded to the top fifteen finishers. Rider had to finish the race to earn points.

Position	**1st**	**2nd**	**3rd**	**4th**	**5th**	**6th**	**7th**	**8th**	**9th**	**10th**	**11th**	**12th**	**13th**	**14th**	**15th**
Points	25	20	16	13	11	10	9	8	7	6	5	4	3	2	1

==== Riders' standings ====
- Rounds marked with a light blue background were under wet race conditions or stopped by rain.
- Riders marked with light blue background were eligible for Rookie of the Year awards.

Pos	Rider	Bike	QAT (Qatar)	SPA (Spain)	TUR (Turkey)	CHN (China)	FRA (France)	ITA (Italy)	CAT (Catalonia)	GBR (United Kingdom)	NED (Netherlands)	GER (Germany)	CZE (Czech Republic)	SMR (San Marino)	POR (Portugal)	JPN (Japan)	AUS (Australia)	MAL (Malaysia)	VAL (Valencian Community)	Pts
1	(Hungary) Gábor Talmácsi	Aprilia	**2**	1	5	4	4	4	**2**	Ret	3	**1**	**4**	2	2	2	8	1	**2**	282
2	(Spain) Héctor Faubel	Aprilia	1	3	10	2	6	**1**	Ret	3	2	3	1	17	1	3	3	**3**	1	277
3	(Japan) Tomoyoshi Koyama	KTM	6	Ret	3	Ret	10	5	1	2	6	2	5	3	7	14	6	2	9	193
4	(Czech Republic) Lukáš Pešek	Derbi	3	2	6	1	2	Ret	13	18	7	6	3	**20**	13	12	1	6	5	182
5	(Italy) Mattia Pasini	Aprilia	Ret	**Ret**	**Ret**	**10**	**Ret**	6	Ret	**1**	**1**	Ret	2	1	**8**	**1**	**7**	8	4	174
6	(Italy) Simone Corsi	Aprilia	5	Ret	1	5	8	3	7	10	5	4	7	Ret	4	6	4	7	12	168
7	(Spain) Sergio Gadea	Aprilia	Ret	5	Ret	6	1	2	4	4	4	Ret	Ret	4	Ret	8	9	5	3	160
8	(Spain) Joan Olivé	Aprilia	11	8	2	19	5	Ret	8	5	18	11	12	12	5	5	2	4	30	131
9	(Spain) Pol Espargaró	Aprilia	7	4	11	9	11	9	5	Ret	11	Ret	6	5	3	Ret	11	Ret	10	110
10	(United Kingdom) Bradley Smith	Honda	12	26	8	8	3	8	6	7	WD	8	13	8	12	Ret	16	9	8	101
11	(Spain) Esteve Rabat	Honda	8	Ret	14	3	DNS		12	Ret	13	12	11	11	11	Ret	5	15	6	74
12	(Austria) Michael Ranseder	Derbi	13	9	12	7	14	11	10	20	9	10	8	10	Ret	9	22	Ret	13	73
13	(Switzerland) Randy Krummenacher	KTM	19	17	15	27	13	13	3	13	12	5	9	6	10	19	12	17	15	69
14	(Germany) Sandro Cortese	Aprilia	17	7	Ret	18	7	7	11	12	8	7	10	15	Ret	Ret	10	Ret	Ret	66
15	(Spain) Pablo Nieto	Aprilia	9	6	13	16	15	Ret	20	9	Ret	9	Ret	Ret	Ret	7	Ret	12	7	57
16	(Italy) Raffaele De Rosa	Aprilia	4	Ret	4	12	Ret	14	Ret	8	14	Ret	18	9	9	Ret	Ret	28	Ret	56
17	(France) Mike Di Meglio	Honda	14	DNS		14	9	Ret	19	6	Ret	15	20	13	16	4	14	14	23	42
18	(Germany) Stefan Bradl	Aprilia							9		10	13		7	6	15	Ret	13	Ret	39
19	(Italy) Lorenzo Zanetti	Aprilia	18	10	7	15	16	10	14	11	15	28	17	16	17	Ret	18	19	Ret	30
20	(Italy) Andrea Iannone	Aprilia	15	12	9	11	Ret	Ret	17	15	20	24	Ret	14	18	10	20	18	20	26
21	(France) Alexis Masbou	Honda	10	Ret	Ret	13	12	Ret	16	19	16	19	14	21	14	21	Ret	10	14	25
22	(Spain) Nicolás Terol	Derbi	16	14	16	Ret	19	12	23	24	17	22	22	18	Ret	17	13	11	11	19
23	(Switzerland) Dominique Aegerter	Aprilia	20	19	24	21	20	15	15	Ret	28	21	29	23	Ret	11	19	Ret	18	7
24	(Italy) Stefano Bianco	Aprilia	Ret	11	17	Ret	17	Ret		Ret	19	16	15	Ret	15	Ret		16	17	7
25	(United States) Stevie Bonsey	KTM	22	13	25	Ret	Ret	20	Ret	23	27	18	16	26	Ret	Ret	15	26	16	4
26	(United Kingdom) Danny Webb	Honda	Ret	Ret	23	23	27	21	26	25	Ret	27	28	30	20	13	Ret	22	21	3
27	(Germany) Georg Fröhlich	Honda										14								2
28	(Spain) Enrique Jerez	Honda								14	23									2
29	(Italy) Simone Grotzkyj	Aprilia	Ret	15	Ret	17	18	22	Ret	17	25	Ret	30	28	21	Ret	21	20	Ret	1
	(Romania) Robert Mureșan	Derbi	Ret	18	22	26	23	19	24	16	Ret	17	Ret	29	23	Ret	DNQ	23	22	0
	(Netherlands) Joey Litjens	Honda	21	21	20	22	25	16	Ret	21	26	Ret	24	27	DNS		17	24	24	0
	(Italy) Roberto Tamburini	Aprilia	23	25	18	20	22	24	22	29	22	20	21	19	22	16	23	21	19	0
	(Spain) Pere Tutusaus	Aprilia		16					18						Ret				27	0
	(Italy) Simone Sancioni	Aprilia						17						22						0
	(Italy) Federico Sandi	Aprilia	Ret	Ret	19	Ret	26	18	21	Ret	24	23	19	Ret	19	Ret				0
	(Japan) Kazuma Watanabe	Honda														18				0
	(Netherlands) Hugo van den Berg	Aprilia	24	20	26	25	24	23	25	26	21	25	27	31						0
	(Japan) Nayuta Mizuno	Yamaha														20				0
	(Italy) Dino Lombardi	Honda		23	Ret	24	21	Ret	DNS			DNS	26	Ret	Ret	Ret	24	NC	25	0
	(United Kingdom) Kev Coghlan	Honda			21					Ret										0
	(Spain) Iván Maestro	Aprilia		22					27										Ret	0
	(Japan) Shoya Tomizawa	Honda														22				0
	(United Kingdom) Luke Jones	Honda								22										0
	(Italy) Ferruccio Lamborghini	Aprilia												24			23	27	28	0
	(Spain) Ricard Cardús	Aprilia											23		DNS					0
	(Spain) Daniel Sáez	Aprilia		24															26	0
	(France) Louis Rossi	Honda													24					0
	(Italy) Roberto Lacalendola	Aprilia						Ret						25						0
	(France) Cyril Carrillo	Honda																25		0
	(Germany) Toni Wirsing	Honda											25							0
	(Australia) Glenn Scott	Aprilia															26			0
	(Germany) Eric Hübsch	Aprilia										26								0
	(Germany) Tobias Siegert	Aprilia			27			DNS												0
	(United Kingdom) Nikki Coates	Honda								27										0
	(United Kingdom) Robbie Stewart	Honda								28										0
	(France) Romain Maitre	Honda					28													0
	(Hungary) Alen Győrfi	Aprilia			Ret														29	0
	(Austria) Philipp Eitzinger	Honda							Ret		29									0
	(Germany) Sebastian Eckner	Honda										29								0
	(France) Steven Le Coquen	Honda					29													0
	(Netherlands) Roy Pouw	Aprilia									30									0
	(United Kingdom) Tom Hayward	Honda								30										0
	(Czech Republic) Karel Pešek	Aprilia											31							0
	(Netherlands) Patrick van de Waarsenburg	Honda									31									0
	(Italy) Federico Biaggi	Friba												32						0
	(Netherlands) Jasper Iwema	Honda									32									0
	(Netherlands) Ferry Stoffer	Honda									33									0
	(Japan) Takaaki Nakagami	Honda																	Ret	0
	(Japan) Iori Namihira	Honda														Ret				0
	(Japan) Yuuichi Yanagisawa	Honda														Ret				0
	(Czech Republic) Michal Prášek	Honda											Ret							0
	(Czech Republic) Karel Májek	FGR											Ret							0
	(Germany) Patrick Unger	Aprilia										Ret								0
	(France) Julien Cartron	Honda					Ret													0
	(France) Valentin Debise	Honda					DNS													0
	(Australia) Blake Leigh-Smith	Honda															DNQ			0
	(Australia) Rhys Moller	Honda															DNQ			0
	(Australia) Jackson Leigh-Smith	Honda															DNQ			0
	(Portugal) Ivo Relvas	Aprilia													DNQ					0
	(France) Gwen Le Badezet	Honda					DNQ													0
	(Hungary) Nikolett Kovács	Honda			DNQ															0
Pos	Rider	Bike	QAT (Qatar)	SPA (Spain)	TUR (Turkey)	CHN (China)	FRA (France)	ITA (Italy)	CAT (Catalonia)	GBR (United Kingdom)	NED (Netherlands)	GER (Germany)	CZE (Czech Republic)	SMR (San Marino)	POR (Portugal)	JPN (Japan)	AUS (Australia)	MAL (Malaysia)	VAL (Valencian Community)	Pts

Colour	Result
Gold	Winner
Silver	Second place
Bronze	Third place
Green	Points classification
Blue	Non-points classification
Blue	Non-classified finish (NC)
Purple	Retired, not classified (Ret)
Red	Did not qualify (DNQ)
Red	Did not pre-qualify (DNPQ)
Black	Disqualified (DSQ)
White	Did not start (DNS)
White	Withdrew (WD)
White	Race cancelled (C)
Blank	Did not practice (DNP)
Blank	Did not arrive (DNA)
Blank	Excluded (EX)

**Bold** – Pole position
Italics – Fastest lap

==== Constructors' standings ====
- Each constructor got the same number of points as their best placed rider in each race.
- Rounds marked with a light blue background were under wet race conditions or stopped by rain.

Pos	Constructor	QAT (Qatar)	SPA (Spain)	TUR (Turkey)	CHN (China)	FRA (France)	ITA (Italy)	CAT (Catalonia)	GBR (United Kingdom)	NED (Netherlands)	GER (Germany)	CZE (Czech Republic)	SMR (San Marino)	POR (Portugal)	JPN (Japan)	AUS (Australia)	MAL (Malaysia)	VAL (Valencian Community)	Pts
1	(Italy) Aprilia	1	1	1	2	1	1	2	1	1	1	1	1	1	1	2	1	1	410
2	(Spain) Derbi	3	2	6	1	2	11	10	16	7	6	3	10	13	9	1	6	5	199
3	(Austria) KTM	6	13	3	27	10	5	1	2	6	2	5	3	7	14	6	2	9	196
4	(Japan) Honda	8	21	8	3	3	8	6	6	13	8	11	8	11	4	5	9	6	146
	(Japan) Yamaha														20				0
	(Italy) Friba												32						0
	(Czech Republic) FGR											Ret							0
Pos	Constructor	QAT (Qatar)	SPA (Spain)	TUR (Turkey)	CHN (China)	FRA (France)	ITA (Italy)	CAT (Catalonia)	GBR (United Kingdom)	NED (Netherlands)	GER (Germany)	CZE (Czech Republic)	SMR (San Marino)	POR (Portugal)	JPN (Japan)	AUS (Australia)	MAL (Malaysia)	VAL (Valencian Community)	Pts
