= 2004 Valencian Community motorcycle Grand Prix =

2004 Valencian Community Grand Prix
Race details
- Race 16 of 16 races in the 2004 Grand Prix motorcycle racing season
- Date: 31 October 2004
- Official name: Gran Premio Marlboro de la Comunitat Valenciana
- Location: Circuit Ricardo Tormo
- Course: Permanent racing facility; 4.005 km (2.489 mi)

MotoGP
Pole position
- Rider: (Japan) Makoto Tamada
- Time: 1:32.815
Fastest lap
- Rider: (Italy) Max Biaggi
- Time: 1:33.582 on lap 6
Podium
- First: (Italy) Valentino Rossi
- Second: (Italy) Max Biaggi
- Third: (Australia) Troy Bayliss

250cc
Pole position
- Rider: (Spain) Daniel Pedrosa
- Time: 1:36.367
Fastest lap
- Rider: (Spain) Daniel Pedrosa
- Time: 1:36.957 on lap 3
Podium
- First: (Spain) Daniel Pedrosa
- Second: (Spain) Toni Elías
- Third: (France) Randy de Puniet

125cc
Pole position
- Rider: (Italy) Andrea Dovizioso
- Time: 1:39.927
Fastest lap
- Rider: (Spain) Pablo Nieto
- Time: 1:40.581 on lap 5
Podium
- First: (Spain) Héctor Barberá
- Second: (Italy) Andrea Dovizioso
- Third: (Spain) Álvaro Bautista

The 2004 Valencian Community motorcycle Grand Prix was the last round of the 2004 MotoGP Championship. It took place on the weekend of 29–31 October 2004 at the Circuit Ricardo Tormo.

== MotoGP classification ==
Kenny Roberts Jr. was replaced by Gregorio Lavilla after the first practice session due to injury.

Pos.	No.	Rider	Team	Manufacturer	Laps	Time/Retired	Grid	Points
1	46	(Italy) Valentino Rossi	Gauloises Fortuna Yamaha	Yamaha	30	47:16.145	3	25
2	3	(Italy) Max Biaggi	Camel Honda	Honda	30	+0.425	2	20
3	12	(Australia) Troy Bayliss	Ducati Marlboro Team	Ducati	30	+3.133	6	16
4	15	(Spain) Sete Gibernau	Telefónica Movistar Honda MotoGP	Honda	30	+6.128	4	13
5	6	(Japan) Makoto Tamada	Camel Honda	Honda	30	+7.768	1	11
6	4	(Brazil) Alex Barros	Repsol Honda Team	Honda	30	+14.675	12	10
7	56	(Japan) Shinya Nakano	Kawasaki Racing Team	Kawasaki	30	+23.315	10	9
8	45	(United States) Colin Edwards	Telefónica Movistar Honda MotoGP	Honda	30	+27.441	8	8
9	65	(Italy) Loris Capirossi	Ducati Marlboro Team	Ducati	30	+29.403	13	7
10	17	(Japan) Norifumi Abe	Fortuna Gauloises Tech 3	Yamaha	30	+31.537	15	6
11	66	(Germany) Alex Hofmann	Kawasaki Racing Team	Kawasaki	30	+40.951	11	5
12	21	(United States) John Hopkins	Team Suzuki MotoGP	Suzuki	30	+1:02.014	7	4
13	99	(United Kingdom) Jeremy McWilliams	MS Aprilia Racing	Aprilia	30	+1:04.637	14	3
14	7	(Spain) Carlos Checa	Gauloises Fortuna Yamaha	Yamaha	30	+1:08.042	9	2
15	50	(United Kingdom) Neil Hodgson	D'Antin MotoGP	Ducati	30	+1:09.364	18	1
16	24	(Australia) Garry McCoy	MS Aprilia Racing	Aprilia	30	+1:15.022	20	
17	32	(Spain) Gregorio Lavilla	Team Suzuki MotoGP	Suzuki	30	+1:15.274	19	
18	9	(Japan) Nobuatsu Aoki	Proton Team KR	Proton KR	29	+1 lap	21	
19	77	(United Kingdom) James Ellison	WCM	Harris WCM	29	+1 lap	23	
Ret	19	(France) Olivier Jacque	Moriwaki Racing	Moriwaki	24	Retirement	22	
Ret	69	(United States) Nicky Hayden	Repsol Honda Team	Honda	22	Accident	5	
Ret	35	(United Kingdom) Chris Burns	WCM	Harris WCM	11	Accident	25	
Ret	33	(Italy) Marco Melandri	Fortuna Gauloises Tech 3	Yamaha	10	Accident	16	
Ret	11	(Spain) Rubén Xaus	D'Antin MotoGP	Ducati	10	Accident	17	
DNS	80	(United States) Kurtis Roberts	Proton Team KR	Proton KR	0	Did not start	24	

== 250 cc classification ==
Pos.	No.	Rider	Manufacturer	Laps	Time/Retired	Grid	Points
1	26	(Spain) Daniel Pedrosa	Honda	27	44:10.176	1	25
2	24	(Spain) Toni Elías	Honda	27	+8.086	5	20
3	7	(France) Randy de Puniet	Aprilia	27	+27.412	4	16
4	21	(Italy) Franco Battaini	Aprilia	27	+31.620	6	13
5	57	(United Kingdom) Chaz Davies	Aprilia	27	+34.059	10	11
6	10	(Spain) Fonsi Nieto	Aprilia	27	+34.784	16	10
7	2	(Italy) Roberto Rolfo	Honda	27	+40.352	18	9
8	8	(Japan) Naoki Matsudo	Yamaha	27	+46.761	9	8
9	33	(Spain) Héctor Faubel	Aprilia	27	+46.770	13	7
10	25	(Italy) Alex Baldolini	Aprilia	27	+58.235	21	6
11	52	(Spain) José David de Gea	Honda	27	+1:03.287	12	5
12	12	(France) Arnaud Vincent	Aprilia	27	+1:05.615	20	4
13	96	(Czech Republic) Jakub Smrž	Honda	27	+1:06.024	14	3
14	6	(Spain) Alex Debón	Honda	27	+1:06.858	11	2
15	11	(Spain) Joan Olivé	Aprilia	27	+1:10.842	15	1
16	41	(Spain) Álvaro Molina	Aprilia	27	+1:13.946	25	
17	16	(Sweden) Johan Stigefelt	Aprilia	27	+1:14.621	22	
18	28	(Germany) Dirk Heidolf	Aprilia	27	+1:15.103	19	
19	43	(Czech Republic) Radomil Rous	Yamaha	27	+1:40.045	27	
20	42	(France) Grégory Leblanc	Aprilia	26	+1 lap	24	
21	75	(Netherlands) Hans Smees	Aprilia	26	+1 lap	28	
22	63	(Italy) Jarno Ronzoni	Aprilia	26	+1 lap	29	
Ret	19	(Argentina) Sebastián Porto	Aprilia	18	Accident	2	
Ret	50	(France) Sylvain Guintoli	Aprilia	18	Accident	17	
Ret	64	(Sweden) Frederik Watz	Honda	17	Retirement	26	
Ret	44	(Japan) Taro Sekiguchi	Yamaha	14	Retirement	23	
Ret	51	(San Marino) Alex de Angelis	Aprilia	3	Accident	3	
Ret	54	(San Marino) Manuel Poggiali	Aprilia	1	Accident	8	
DSQ	73	(Japan) Hiroshi Aoyama	Honda	27	(+10.343)	7	
DNS	9	(France) Hugo Marchand	Aprilia		Did not start		
DNS	36	(France) Erwan Nigon	Aprilia		Did not start		
DNQ	88	(Hungary) Gergő Talmácsi	Yamaha		Did not qualify		

== 125 cc classification ==
Pos.	No.	Rider	Manufacturer	Laps	Time/Retired	Grid	Points
1	3	(Spain) Héctor Barberá	Aprilia	24	40:45.283	2	25
2	34	(Italy) Andrea Dovizioso	Honda	24	+0.761	1	20
3	19	(Spain) Álvaro Bautista	Aprilia	24	+0.979	11	16
4	22	(Spain) Pablo Nieto	Aprilia	24	+1.285	14	13
5	33	(Spain) Sergio Gadea	Aprilia	24	+1.338	5	11
6	15	(Italy) Roberto Locatelli	Aprilia	24	+3.708	7	10
7	23	(Italy) Gino Borsoi	Aprilia	24	+8.782	4	9
8	24	(Italy) Simone Corsi	Honda	24	+12.425	13	8
9	14	(Hungary) Gábor Talmácsi	Malaguti	24	+12.515	10	7
10	21	(Germany) Steve Jenkner	Aprilia	24	+16.655	9	6
11	54	(Italy) Mattia Pasini	Aprilia	24	+19.936	15	5
12	6	(Italy) Mirko Giansanti	Aprilia	24	+20.076	25	4
13	10	(Spain) Julián Simón	Honda	24	+20.127	8	3
14	12	(Switzerland) Thomas Lüthi	Honda	24	+31.001	17	2
15	32	(Italy) Fabrizio Lai	Gilera	24	+38.040	12	1
16	37	(Italy) Michele Pirro	Aprilia	24	+39.610	28	
17	45	(Italy) Lorenzo Zanetti	Aprilia	24	+39.951	21	
18	88	(Austria) Michael Ranseder	KTM	24	+45.884	36	
19	70	(Spain) Julián Miralles	Aprilia	24	+46.171	33	
20	42	(Italy) Gioele Pellino	Aprilia	24	+46.357	32	
21	25	(Hungary) Imre Tóth	Aprilia	24	+46.403	26	
22	59	(Spain) Nicolás Terol	Aprilia	24	+46.803	24	
23	66	(Finland) Vesa Kallio	Aprilia	24	+56.536	31	
24	57	(Spain) Aleix Espargaró	Honda	24	+56.557	29	
25	43	(Spain) Manuel Hernández	Aprilia	24	+59.931	22	
26	71	(Spain) Enrique Jerez	Honda	24	+1:02.191	34	
27	28	(Spain) Jordi Carchano	Aprilia	24	+1:02.284	35	
Ret	48	(Spain) Jorge Lorenzo	Derbi	14	Accident	3	
Ret	27	(Australia) Casey Stoner	KTM	14	Accident	6	
Ret	26	(Germany) Dario Giuseppetti	Honda	9	Accident	19	
Ret	16	(Netherlands) Raymond Schouten	Honda	6	Retirement	37	
Ret	36	(Finland) Mika Kallio	KTM	5	Accident	20	
Ret	8	(Italy) Manuel Manna	Malaguti	5	Retirement	30	
Ret	31	(Italy) Max Sabbatani	Honda	2	Retirement	38	
Ret	52	(Czech Republic) Lukáš Pešek	Honda	1	Retirement	16	
Ret	7	(Italy) Stefano Perugini	Gilera	1	Retirement	27	
Ret	47	(Spain) Ángel Rodríguez	Derbi	0	Accident	23	
Ret	50	(Italy) Andrea Ballerini	Aprilia	0	Accident	18	
DNQ	9	(Czech Republic) Markéta Janáková	Honda		Did not qualify		

== Championship standings after the race (MotoGP) ==
Below are the standings for the top five riders and constructors after round sixteen has concluded.

Riders' Championship standings

Pos.	Rider	Points
1	(Italy) Valentino Rossi	304
2	(Spain) Sete Gibernau	257
3	(Italy) Max Biaggi	217
4	(Brazil) Alex Barros	165
5	(United States) Colin Edwards	157

Constructors' Championship standings

Pos.	Constructor	Points
1	(Japan) Honda	355
2	(Japan) Yamaha	328
3	(Italy) Ducati	169
4	(Japan) Kawasaki	95
5	(Japan) Suzuki	73

- Note: Only the top five positions are included for both sets of standings.

Previous race: 2004 Australian Grand Prix	FIM Grand Prix World Championship; 2004 season	Next race: 2005 Spanish Grand Prix
Previous race: 2003 Valencian Grand Prix	Valencian Community motorcycle Grand Prix	Next race: 2005 Valencian Grand Prix
