= 2005 German motorcycle Grand Prix =

(Germany) 2005 German Grand Prix
Race details
- Race 10 of 17 races in the 2005 Grand Prix motorcycle racing season
- Date: 31 July 2005
- Official name: Alice Motorrad Grand Prix Deutschland
- Location: Sachsenring
- Course: Permanent racing facility; 3.671 km (2.281 mi)

MotoGP
Pole position
- Rider: (United States) Nicky Hayden
- Time: 1:22.785
Fastest lap
- Rider: (Spain) Sete Gibernau
- Time: 1:23.705 on lap 3 (first part)
Podium
- First: (Italy) Valentino Rossi
- Second: (Spain) Sete Gibernau
- Third: (United States) Nicky Hayden

250cc
Pole position
- Rider: (San Marino) Alex de Angelis
- Time: 1:24.618
Fastest lap
- Rider: (Spain) Daniel Pedrosa
- Time: 1:25.327 on lap 16
Podium
- First: (Spain) Daniel Pedrosa
- Second: (San Marino) Alex de Angelis
- Third: (Japan) Hiroshi Aoyama

125cc
Pole position
- Rider: (Finland) Mika Kallio
- Time: 1:27.965
Fastest lap
- Rider: (Finland) Mika Kallio
- Time: 1:28.522 on lap 6
Podium
- First: (Finland) Mika Kallio
- Second: (Switzerland) Thomas Lüthi
- Third: (Italy) Marco Simoncelli

The 2005 German motorcycle Grand Prix was the tenth round of the 2005 MotoGP Championship. It took place on the weekend of 29–31 July 2005 at the Sachsenring.

== MotoGP classification ==
The race, scheduled to be run for 30 laps, was stopped after 5 full laps due to an accident. It was later restarted for 25 laps, with the grid determined by the running order before the suspension. The second part of the race determined the final result.

Pos.	No.	Rider	Team	Manufacturer	Laps	Time/Retired	Grid	Points
1	46	(Italy) Valentino Rossi	Gauloises Yamaha Team	Yamaha	25	35:04.434	4	25
2	15	(Spain) Sete Gibernau	Movistar Honda MotoGP	Honda	25	+0.685	2	20
3	69	(United States) Nicky Hayden	Repsol Honda Team	Honda	25	+0.885	1	16
4	3	(Italy) Max Biaggi	Repsol Honda Team	Honda	25	+2.365	6	13
5	4	(Brazil) Alex Barros	Camel Honda	Honda	25	+2.855	3	11
6	56	(Japan) Shinya Nakano	Kawasaki Racing Team	Kawasaki	25	+4.557	12	10
7	33	(Italy) Marco Melandri	Movistar Honda MotoGP	Honda	25	+12.269	5	9
8	5	(United States) Colin Edwards	Gauloises Yamaha Team	Yamaha	25	+14.849	7	8
9	65	(Italy) Loris Capirossi	Ducati Marlboro Team	Ducati	25	+23.489	8	7
10	6	(Japan) Makoto Tamada	Konica Minolta Honda	Honda	25	+27.829	15	6
11	10	(United States) Kenny Roberts Jr.	Team Suzuki MotoGP	Suzuki	25	+42.099	9	5
12	24	(Spain) Toni Elías	Fortuna Yamaha Team	Yamaha	25	+47.304	17	4
13	11	(Spain) Rubén Xaus	Fortuna Yamaha Team	Yamaha	25	+1:00.175	18	3
14	44	(Italy) Roberto Rolfo	Team d'Antin Pramac	Ducati	25	+1:07.714	20	2
15	27	(Italy) Franco Battaini	Blata WCM	Blata	24	+1 lap	22	1
Ret	7	(Spain) Carlos Checa	Ducati Marlboro Team	Ducati	4	Accident	11	
Ret	21	(United States) John Hopkins	Team Suzuki MotoGP	Suzuki	0	Did not restart	10	
Ret	12	(Australia) Troy Bayliss	Camel Honda	Honda	0	Accident in 1st part	16	
Ret	77	(United Kingdom) James Ellison	Blata WCM	Blata	0	Retirement in 1st part	19	
Ret	19	(France) Olivier Jacque	Kawasaki Racing Team	Kawasaki	0	Accident in 1st part	14	
Ret	66	(Germany) Alex Hofmann	Kawasaki Racing Team	Kawasaki	0	Accident in 1st part	13	
Ret	67	(United Kingdom) Shane Byrne	Team Roberts	Proton KR	0	Accident in 1st part	21	

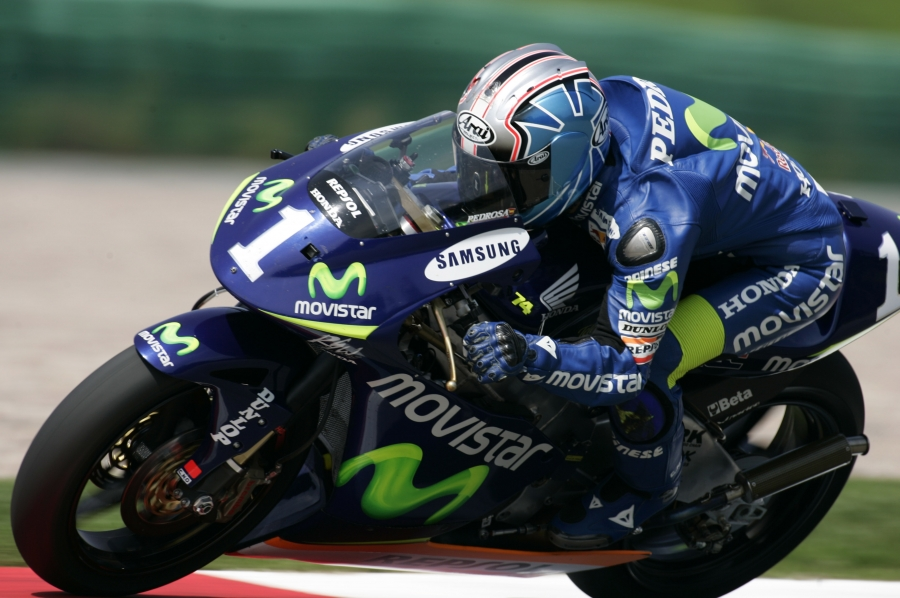
Dani Pedrosa, riding his bike during the 250cc race, which he went on to win.

== 250 cc classification ==
Pos.	No.	Rider	Manufacturer	Laps	Time/Retired	Grid	Points
1	1	(Spain) Daniel Pedrosa	Honda	29	41:35.089	2	25
2	5	(San Marino) Alex de Angelis	Aprilia	29	+7.940	1	20
3	73	(Japan) Hiroshi Aoyama	Honda	29	+11.171	5	16
4	34	(Italy) Andrea Dovizioso	Honda	29	+11.346	10	13
5	19	(Argentina) Sebastián Porto	Aprilia	29	+11.444	4	11
6	7	(France) Randy de Puniet	Aprilia	29	+17.536	8	10
7	27	(Australia) Casey Stoner	Aprilia	29	+17.949	7	9
8	80	(Spain) Héctor Barberá	Honda	29	+22.193	9	8
9	55	(Japan) Yuki Takahashi	Honda	29	+42.288	6	7
10	14	(Australia) Anthony West	KTM	29	+42.696	12	6
11	50	(France) Sylvain Guintoli	Aprilia	29	+51.283	13	5
12	6	(Spain) Alex Debón	Honda	29	+1:01.959	21	4
13	28	(Germany) Dirk Heidolf	Honda	29	+1:03.260	18	3
14	17	(Germany) Steve Jenkner	Aprilia	29	+1:13.348	16	2
15	36	(Colombia) Martín Cárdenas	Aprilia	29	+1:13.813	26	1
16	96	(Czech Republic) Jakub Smrž	Honda	29	+1:13.876	19	
17	32	(Italy) Mirko Giansanti	Aprilia	29	+1:14.151	20	
18	44	(Japan) Taro Sekiguchi	Aprilia	29	+1:18.289	23	
19	41	(Spain) Álvaro Molina	Aprilia	28	+1 lap	28	
20	64	(Czech Republic) Radomil Rous	Honda	28	+1 lap	25	
21	26	(Sweden) Andreas Mårtensson	Yamaha	28	+1 lap	29	
22	23	(Sweden) Nicklas Cajback	Yamaha	28	+1 lap	31	
23	52	(Germany) Thomas Walther	Honda	27	+2 laps	32	
Ret	38	(France) Grégory Leblanc	Aprilia	20	Retirement	22	
Ret	24	(Italy) Simone Corsi	Aprilia	20	Retirement	14	
Ret	16	(Germany) Franz Aschenbrenner	Honda	19	Accident	30	
Ret	57	(United Kingdom) Chaz Davies	Aprilia	8	Retirement	15	
Ret	8	(Italy) Andrea Ballerini	Aprilia	8	Retirement	24	
Ret	25	(Italy) Alex Baldolini	Aprilia	5	Accident	17	
Ret	48	(Spain) Jorge Lorenzo	Honda	4	Accident	3	
Ret	15	(Italy) Roberto Locatelli	Aprilia	2	Accident	11	
Ret	21	(France) Arnaud Vincent	Fantic	2	Retirement	27	
DNQ	53	(Netherlands) Patrick Lakerveld	Honda		Did not qualify		
DNQ	42	(Austria) Yves Polzer	Aprilia		Did not qualify		
DNQ	20	(Italy) Gabriele Ferro	Fantic		Did not qualify		

== 125 cc classification ==
The race, scheduled to be run for 27 laps, was stopped after 20 full laps due to an accident and did not restart as two thirds of the race distance had been completed.

Pos.	No.	Rider	Manufacturer	Laps	Time/Retired	Grid	Points
1	36	(Finland) Mika Kallio	KTM	20	29:46.795	1	25
2	12	(Switzerland) Thomas Lüthi	Honda	20	+0.134	3	20
3	58	(Italy) Marco Simoncelli	Aprilia	20	+0.288	2	16
4	14	(Hungary) Gábor Talmácsi	KTM	20	+0.481	8	13
5	60	(Spain) Julián Simón	KTM	20	+1.435	5	11
6	52	(Czech Republic) Lukáš Pešek	Derbi	20	+1.628	7	10
7	32	(Italy) Fabrizio Lai	Honda	20	+15.039	13	9
8	6	(Spain) Joan Olivé	Aprilia	20	+15.256	17	8
9	41	(Spain) Aleix Espargaró	Honda	20	+15.305	11	7
10	22	(Spain) Pablo Nieto	Derbi	20	+15.524	18	6
11	54	(San Marino) Manuel Poggiali	Gilera	20	+15.577	21	5
12	76	(Austria) Michael Ranseder	KTM	20	+20.873	27	4
13	8	(Italy) Lorenzo Zanetti	Aprilia	20	+21.045	12	3
14	11	(Germany) Sandro Cortese	Honda	20	+21.186	15	2
15	35	(Italy) Raffaele De Rosa	Aprilia	20	+25.343	25	1
16	77	(Germany) Stefan Bradl	KTM	20	+26.261	26	
17	44	(Czech Republic) Karel Abraham	Aprilia	20	+27.185	30	
18	25	(Germany) Dario Giuseppetti	Aprilia	20	+31.138	29	
19	46	(Spain) Mateo Túnez	Aprilia	20	+32.802	36	
20	45	(Hungary) Imre Tóth	Aprilia	20	+33.273	23	
21	13	(Germany) Patrick Unger	Aprilia	20	+34.418	37	
22	26	(Switzerland) Vincent Braillard	Aprilia	20	+44.072	39	
23	43	(Spain) Manuel Hernández	Aprilia	20	+48.367	22	
24	98	(Germany) Manuel Mickan	Honda	20	+1:06.745	41	
25	78	(Netherlands) Hugo van den Berg	Aprilia	20	+1:06.857	40	
26	28	(Spain) Jordi Carchano	Aprilia	18	+2 laps	28	
Ret	71	(Japan) Tomoyoshi Koyama	Honda	16	Accident	6	
Ret	63	(France) Mike Di Meglio	Honda	16	Accident	20	
Ret	47	(Spain) Ángel Rodríguez	Honda	16	Retirement	33	
Ret	16	(Netherlands) Raymond Schouten	Honda	9	Accident	31	
Ret	75	(Italy) Mattia Pasini	Aprilia	9	Retirement	4	
Ret	31	(Germany) Sascha Hommel	Malaguti	8	Retirement	38	
Ret	10	(Italy) Federico Sandi	Honda	7	Accident	35	
Ret	33	(Spain) Sergio Gadea	Aprilia	4	Accident	10	
Ret	29	(Italy) Andrea Iannone	Aprilia	1	Accident	14	
Ret	55	(Spain) Héctor Faubel	Aprilia	1	Accident	9	
Ret	18	(Spain) Nicolás Terol	Derbi	1	Retirement	34	
Ret	15	(Italy) Michele Pirro	Malaguti	0	Accident	32	
Ret	19	(Spain) Álvaro Bautista	Honda	0	Accident	19	
Ret	9	(Japan) Toshihisa Kuzuhara	Honda	0	Accident	16	
DSQ	7	(France) Alexis Masbou	Honda	9	Black flag	24	

== Championship standings after the race (MotoGP) ==
Below are the standings for the top five riders and constructors after round ten was concluded.

Riders' Championship standings

Pos.	Rider	Points
1	(Italy) Valentino Rossi	236
2	(Italy) Marco Melandri	116
3	(Spain) Sete Gibernau	115
4	(United States) Colin Edwards	114
5	(Italy) Max Biaggi	113

Constructors' Championship standings

Pos.	Constructor	Points
1	(Japan) Yamaha	240
2	(Japan) Honda	202
3	(Japan) Kawasaki	93
4	(Italy) Ducati	82
5	(Japan) Suzuki	60

- Note: Only the top five positions are included for both sets of standings.

Previous race: 2005 British Grand Prix	FIM Grand Prix World Championship; 2005 season	Next race: 2005 Czech Republic Grand Prix
Previous race: 2004 German Grand Prix	German motorcycle Grand Prix	Next race: 2006 German Grand Prix
