= 2007 Turkish motorcycle Grand Prix =

(Turkey) 2007 Turkish Grand Prix
Race details
- Race 3 of 18 races in the 2007 Grand Prix motorcycle racing season
- Date: 22 April 2007
- Official name: Grand Prix of Turkey
- Location: Istanbul Park
- Course: Permanent racing facility; 5.338 km (3.317 mi)

MotoGP
Pole position
- Rider: (Italy) Valentino Rossi
- Time: 1:52.795
Fastest lap
- Rider: (Australia) Chris Vermeulen
- Time: 1:54.026
Podium
- First: (Australia) Casey Stoner
- Second: (Spain) Toni Elías
- Third: (Italy) Loris Capirossi

250cc
Pole position
- Rider: (Italy) Andrea Dovizioso
- Time: 1:57.473
Fastest lap
- Rider: (Italy) Andrea Dovizioso
- Time: 1:57.815
Podium
- First: (Italy) Andrea Dovizioso
- Second: (Spain) Jorge Lorenzo
- Third: (Spain) Álvaro Bautista

125cc
Pole position
- Rider: (Italy) Mattia Pasini
- Time: 2:04.722
Fastest lap
- Rider: (Italy) Raffaele De Rosa
- Time: 2:05.217
Podium
- First: (Italy) Simone Corsi
- Second: (Spain) Joan Olivé
- Third: (Japan) Tomoyoshi Koyama

The 2007 Turkish motorcycle Grand Prix was the third round of the 2007 MotoGP championship. It took place on the weekend of 20–22 April 2007 at the Istanbul Park circuit.

== MotoGP classification ==
Pos.	No.	Rider	Team	Manufacturer	Laps	Time/Retired	Grid	Points
1	27	(Australia) Casey Stoner	Ducati Marlboro Team	Ducati	22	42:02.850	4	25
2	24	(Spain) Toni Elías	Honda Gresini	Honda	22	+6.207	10	20
3	65	(Italy) Loris Capirossi	Ducati Marlboro Team	Ducati	22	+8.102	5	16
4	4	(Brazil) Alex Barros	Pramac d'Antin	Ducati	22	+8.135	13	13
5	33	(Italy) Marco Melandri	Honda Gresini	Honda	22	+8.289	14	11
6	21	(United States) John Hopkins	Rizla Suzuki MotoGP	Suzuki	22	+10.186	7	10
7	1	(United States) Nicky Hayden	Repsol Honda Team	Honda	22	+10.239	6	9
8	14	(France) Randy de Puniet	Kawasaki Racing Team	Kawasaki	22	+14.734	9	8
9	66	(Germany) Alex Hofmann	Pramac d'Antin	Ducati	22	+16.042	17	7
10	46	(Italy) Valentino Rossi	Fiat Yamaha Team	Yamaha	22	+18.999	1	6
11	71	(Australia) Chris Vermeulen	Rizla Suzuki MotoGP	Suzuki	22	+26.249	9	5
12	7	(Spain) Carlos Checa	Honda LCR	Honda	22	+29.546	16	4
13	56	(Japan) Shinya Nakano	Konica Minolta Honda	Honda	22	+36.922	12	3
14	6	(Japan) Makoto Tamada	Dunlop Yamaha Tech 3	Yamaha	22	+38.540	15	2
15	50	(France) Sylvain Guintoli	Dunlop Yamaha Tech 3	Yamaha	22	+39.337	19	1
16	10	(United States) Kenny Roberts Jr.	Team Roberts	KR212V	22	+1:09.336	18	
Ret	19	(France) Olivier Jacque	Kawasaki Racing Team	Kawasaki	0	Accident	11	
Ret	5	(United States) Colin Edwards	Fiat Yamaha Team	Yamaha	0	Accident	2	
Ret	26	(Spain) Dani Pedrosa	Repsol Honda Team	Honda	0	Accident	3	

== 250cc classification ==
Pos.	No.	Rider	Manufacturer	Laps	Time/Retired	Grid	Points
1	34	(Italy) Andrea Dovizioso	Honda	20	39:31.153	1	25
2	1	(Spain) Jorge Lorenzo	Aprilia	20	+0.103	2	20
3	19	(Spain) Álvaro Bautista	Aprilia	20	+0.318	3	16
4	3	(San Marino) Alex de Angelis	Aprilia	20	+4.894	4	13
5	12	(Switzerland) Thomas Lüthi	Aprilia	20	+19.755	6	11
6	36	(Finland) Mika Kallio	KTM	20	+22.946	7	10
7	60	(Spain) Julián Simón	Honda	20	+23.283	8	9
8	80	(Spain) Héctor Barberá	Aprilia	20	+47.678	10	8
9	58	(Italy) Marco Simoncelli	Gilera	20	+58.482	5	7
10	32	(Italy) Fabrizio Lai	Aprilia	20	+58.734	14	6
11	41	(Spain) Aleix Espargaró	Aprilia	20	+1:08.588	15	5
12	17	(Czech Republic) Karel Abraham	Aprilia	20	+1:09.032	24	4
13	28	(Germany) Dirk Heidolf	Aprilia	20	+1:10.005	19	3
14	25	(Italy) Alex Baldolini	Aprilia	20	+1:14.509	18	2
15	8	(Thailand) Ratthapark Wilairot	Honda	20	+1:17.732	17	1
16	73	(Japan) Shuhei Aoyama	Honda	20	+1:28.469	12	
17	50	(Republic of Ireland) Eugene Laverty	Honda	20	+1:49.828	21	
Ret	10	(Hungary) Imre Tóth	Aprilia	8	Accident	22	
Ret	9	(Spain) Arturo Tizón	Aprilia	8	Retirement	20	
Ret	16	(France) Jules Cluzel	Aprilia	6	Retirement	16	
Ret	4	(Japan) Hiroshi Aoyama	KTM	4	Retirement	9	
Ret	44	(Japan) Taro Sekiguchi	Aprilia	2	Accident	23	
Ret	14	(Australia) Anthony West	Aprilia	1	Accident	13	
Ret	55	(Japan) Yuki Takahashi	Honda	1	Retirement	11	
OFFICIAL 250cc REPORT

== 125cc classification ==
Pos.	No.	Rider	Manufacturer	Laps	Time/Retired	Grid	Points
1	24	(Italy) Simone Corsi	Aprilia	19	40:03.557	3	25
2	6	(Spain) Joan Olivé	Aprilia	19	+0.098	7	20
3	71	(Japan) Tomoyoshi Koyama	KTM	19	+1.943	6	16
4	35	(Italy) Raffaele De Rosa	Aprilia	19	+2.191	11	13
5	14	(Hungary) Gábor Talmácsi	Aprilia	19	+2.646	4	11
6	52	(Czech Republic) Lukáš Pešek	Derbi	19	+2.939	5	10
7	8	(Italy) Lorenzo Zanetti	Aprilia	19	+3.119	14	9
8	38	(United Kingdom) Bradley Smith	Honda	19	+3.120	13	8
9	29	(Italy) Andrea Iannone	Aprilia	19	+10.353	17	7
10	55	(Spain) Héctor Faubel	Aprilia	19	+10.842	2	6
11	44	(Spain) Pol Espargaró	Aprilia	19	+14.446	18	5
12	60	(Austria) Michael Ranseder	Derbi	19	+15.421	8	4
13	22	(Spain) Pablo Nieto	Aprilia	19	+15.665	12	3
14	12	(Spain) Esteve Rabat	Honda	19	+15.870	21	2
15	34	(Switzerland) Randy Krummenacher	KTM	19	+15.974	16	1
16	18	(Spain) Nicolás Terol	Derbi	19	+16.136	9	
17	27	(Italy) Stefano Bianco	Aprilia	19	+24.203	22	
18	20	(Italy) Roberto Tamburini	Aprilia	19	+33.668	20	
19	15	(Italy) Federico Sandi	Aprilia	19	+34.531	23	
20	37	(Netherlands) Joey Litjens	Honda	19	+45.615	24	
21	54	(United Kingdom) Kev Coghlan	Honda	19	+45.630	27	
22	95	(Romania) Robert Mureșan	Derbi	19	+46.162	28	
23	99	(United Kingdom) Danny Webb	Honda	19	+49.852	30	
24	77	(Switzerland) Dominique Aegerter	Aprilia	19	+51.982	29	
25	51	(United States) Stevie Bonsey	KTM	19	+1:11.252	25	
26	56	(Netherlands) Hugo van den Berg	Aprilia	19	+1:55.696	31	
27	41	(Germany) Tobias Siegert	Aprilia	18	+1 lap	34	
Ret	75	(Italy) Mattia Pasini	Aprilia	18	Retirement	1	
Ret	40	(Hungary) Alen Győrfi	Aprilia	17	Retirement	33	
Ret	33	(Spain) Sergio Gadea	Aprilia	17	Retirement	15	
Ret	53	(Italy) Simone Grotzkyj	Aprilia	13	Retirement	26	
Ret	7	(France) Alexis Masbou	Honda	11	Accident	19	
Ret	13	(Italy) Dino Lombardi	Honda	9	Retirement	32	
Ret	11	(Germany) Sandro Cortese	Aprilia	6	Accident	10	
DNQ	39	(Hungary) Nikolett Kovács	Honda		Did not qualify		
OFFICIAL 125cc REPORT

== Championship standings after the race (MotoGP) ==
Below are the standings for the top five riders and constructors after round three has concluded.

Riders' Championship standings

Pos.	Rider	Points
1	(Australia) Casey Stoner	61
2	(Italy) Valentino Rossi	51
3	(Spain) Dani Pedrosa	36
4	(Spain) Toni Elías	35
5	(Italy) Marco Melandri	30

Constructors' Championship standings

Pos.	Constructor	Points
1	(Italy) Ducati	61
2	(Japan) Honda	56
3	(Japan) Yamaha	51
4	(Japan) Suzuki	30
5	(Japan) Kawasaki	15

- Note: Only the top five positions are included for both sets of standings.

Previous race: 2007 Spanish Grand Prix	FIM Grand Prix World Championship; 2007 season	Next race: 2007 Chinese Grand Prix
Previous race: 2006 Turkish Grand Prix	Turkish motorcycle Grand Prix	Next race: None
