= Thomas Mayer (motorcyclist) =

German motorcycle racer

- Nationality: German
- Born: 29 October 1982 (age 44); Passau, Germany

Thomas Mayer is a Grand Prix motorcycle racer from Germany.

== Career statistics ==
=== By season ===
| Season | Class | Motorcycle | Team | Race | Win | Podium | Pole | FLap | Pts | Plcd |
|---|---|---|---|---|---|---|---|---|---|---|
| 2005 | 125cc | Aprilia | Mayer Racing Passau | 1 | 0 | 0 | 0 | 0 | 0 | NC |
| 2006 | 125cc | Aprilia | Mayer-Racing Passau | 1 | 0 | 0 | 0 | 0 | 0 | NC |
| Total | | | | 2 | 0 | 0 | 0 | 0 | 0 | |

=== Races by year ===
(key)

| Year | Class | Bike | 1 | 2 | 3 | 4 | 5 | 6 | 7 | 8 | 9 | 10 | 11 | 12 | 13 | 14 | 15 | 16 | Pos. | Pts |
|---|---|---|---|---|---|---|---|---|---|---|---|---|---|---|---|---|---|---|---|---|
| 2005 | 125cc | Aprilia | SPA | POR | CHN | FRA | ITA | CAT | NED | GBR | GER | CZE; 24 | JPN | MAL | QAT | AUS | TUR | VAL | NC | 0 |
| 2006 | 125cc | Aprilia | SPA | QAT | TUR | CHN | FRA | ITA | CAT | NED | GBR | GER | CZE; 30 | MAL | AUS | JPN | POR | VAL | NC | 0 |
