= Álvaro Molina (motorcyclist) =

Spanish motorcycle racer

- Nationality: Spanish
- Born: 20 July 1976 (age 50); Huétor Vega, Spain

Álvaro Molina is a Grand Prix motorcycle racer from Spain. He won the European 250cc Championship in 2002 and from 2004 to 2007.

== Personal life ==
Molina was born in Huétor Vega, Granada, Spain.

== Career statistics ==
=== By season ===
Season	Class	Motorcycle	Team	Number	Race	Win	Podium	Pole	FLap	Pts	Plcd
1996	125cc	Honda			1	0	0	0	0	0	NC
1997	125cc	Honda			2	0	0	0	0	1	31st
1998	125cc	Honda	Echo Team Berner	58	3	0	0	0	0	3	27th
1999	250cc	Honda	Echo Team C.C. Neptuno	62	3	0	0	0	0	0	NC
2000	250cc	TSR	Echo Racing Team	38	3	0	0	0	0	0	NC
2001	250cc	Yamaha	Kolmer Racing Team	38	3	0	0	0	0	0	NC
2003	250cc	Aprilia	Mas Racing Team	40	3	0	0	0	0	0	NC
2004	250cc	Aprilia	Mas Racing Team	41	2	0	0	0	0	0	NC
2005	250cc	Aprilia	Andalucia Mas Racing	41	7	0	0	0	0	0	NC
2006	250cc	Aprilia	Andalucia Team Mas / Andalucia-GFC-Mas	31	3	0	0	0	0	2	34th
2007	250cc	Aprilia	Andalucia - GFC - MAS	31	5	0	0	0	0	0	NC
Total					**35**	**0**	**0**	**0**	**0**	**6**	

=== Races by year ===
(key) (Races in bold indicate pole position, races in italics indicate fastest lap)

Year	Class	Bike	1	2	3	4	5	6	7	8	9	10	11	12	13	14	15	16	17	Pos.	Pts
1996	125cc	Honda	MAL	INA	JPN	SPA; Ret	ITA	FRA	NED	GER	GBR	AUT	CZE	IMO	CAT	BRA	AUS			NC	0
1997	125cc	Honda	MAL	JPN	SPA; Ret	ITA	AUT	FRA	NED	IMO	GER	BRA	GBR	CZE	CAT; 15	INA	AUS			31st	1
1998	125cc	Honda	JPN	MAL	SPA; Ret	ITA	FRA	MAD; 13	NED	GBR	GER	CZE	IMO	CAT; 25	AUS	ARG				27th	3
1999	250cc	Honda	MAL	JPN	SPA; 21	FRA	ITA	CAT; Ret	NED	GBR	GER	CZE	IMO	VAL; Ret	AUS	RSA	BRA	ARG		NC	0
2000	250cc	TSR	RSA	MAL	JPN	SPA	FRA	ITA	CAT; Ret	NED	GBR	GER	CZE	POR; 19	VAL; Ret	BRA	PAC	AUS		NC	0
2001	250cc	Yamaha	JPN	RSA	SPA; 22	FRA	ITA	CAT; 24	NED	GBR	GER	CZE	POR	VAL; 20	PAC	AUS	MAL	BRA		NC	0
2003	250cc	Aprilia	JPN	RSA	SPA; 19	FRA	ITA	CAT	NED	GBR	GER	CZE	POR; 19	BRA	PAC	MAL	AUS	VAL; 16		NC	0
2004	250cc	Aprilia	RSA	SPA; Ret	FRA	ITA	CAT	NED	BRA	GER	GBR	CZE	POR	JPN	QAT	MAL	AUS	VAL; 16		NC	0
2005	250cc	Aprilia	SPA; Ret	POR; Ret	CHN	FRA	ITA; 16	CAT	NED	GBR; 18	GER; 19	CZE; 20	JPN	MAL	QAT	AUS	TUR	VAL; Ret		NC	0
2006	250cc	Aprilia	SPA; 14	QAT	TUR	CHN	FRA; 20	ITA	CAT	NED	GBR	GER	CZE	MAL	AUS	JPN	POR	VAL; 17		34th	2
2007	250cc	Aprilia	QAT	SPA; Ret	TUR	CHN	FRA	ITA	CAT; 23	GBR	NED	GER; Ret	CZE	RSM	POR; 16	JPN	AUS	MAL	VAL; 22	NC	0
