= Mateo Túnez =

Spanish motorcycle racer

- Nationality: Spanish
- Born: 21 November 1989 (age 36); Navarrés, Spain
Motorcycle racing career statistics
125cc World Championship
Active years	2005–2006
Manufacturers	Aprilia
Championships	0
2006 championship position	NC (0 pts)
Starts / Wins / Podiums / Poles / F. laps / Points; 23 / 0 / 0 / 0 / 1 / 0

Mateo Túnez Grau (born 21 November 1989 in Navarrés, Valencia, Spain) is a motorcycle road racer. He competed in the 125cc World Championship in 2005 and 2006. He won the Spanish 125cc Championship in 2005.

== Career statistics ==
=== Grand Prix motorcycle racing ===
==== By season ====
Season	Class	Motorcycle	Team	Race	Win	Podium	Pole	FLap	Pts	Plcd
2005	125cc	Aprilia	MVA Aspar	11	0	0	0	1	0	NC
2006	125cc	Aprilia	Master – MVA Aspar Team	12	0	0	0	0	0	NC
Total				**23**	**0**	**0**	**0**	**1**	**0**	

==== Races by year ====
(key) (Races in bold indicate pole position, races in italics indicate fastest lap)

Year	Class	Bike	1	2	3	4	5	6	7	8	9	10	11	12	13	14	15	16	Pos	Pts
2005	125cc	Aprilia	SPA; 17	POR	CHN	FRA	ITA	CAT; 19	NED; Ret	GBR; 24	GER; 19	CZE	JPN; Ret	MAL; 25	QAT; 24	AUS; 23	TUR; 21	VAL; 20	NC	0
2006	125cc	Aprilia	SPA; 28	QAT; 25	TUR; 25	CHN; 28	FRA; Ret	ITA	CAT; 24	NED; 34	GBR; 21	GER; 30	CZE; 21	MAL	AUS	JPN	POR; 23	VAL; 16	NC	0

Sporting positions
Preceded by Aleix Espargaró	Spanish 125cc Champion; 2005	Succeeded by Pol Espargaró
