= List of Grand Prix motorcycle racers: X =

Name	Seasons	World Championships	MotoGP Wins	500cc Wins	350cc Wins	250cc Wins	125cc Wins	80cc Wins	50cc Wins
(Spain) Rubén Xaus	2004-2005	0	0	0	0	0	0	0	0
