= Taro Sekiguchi =

Japanese motorcycle racer

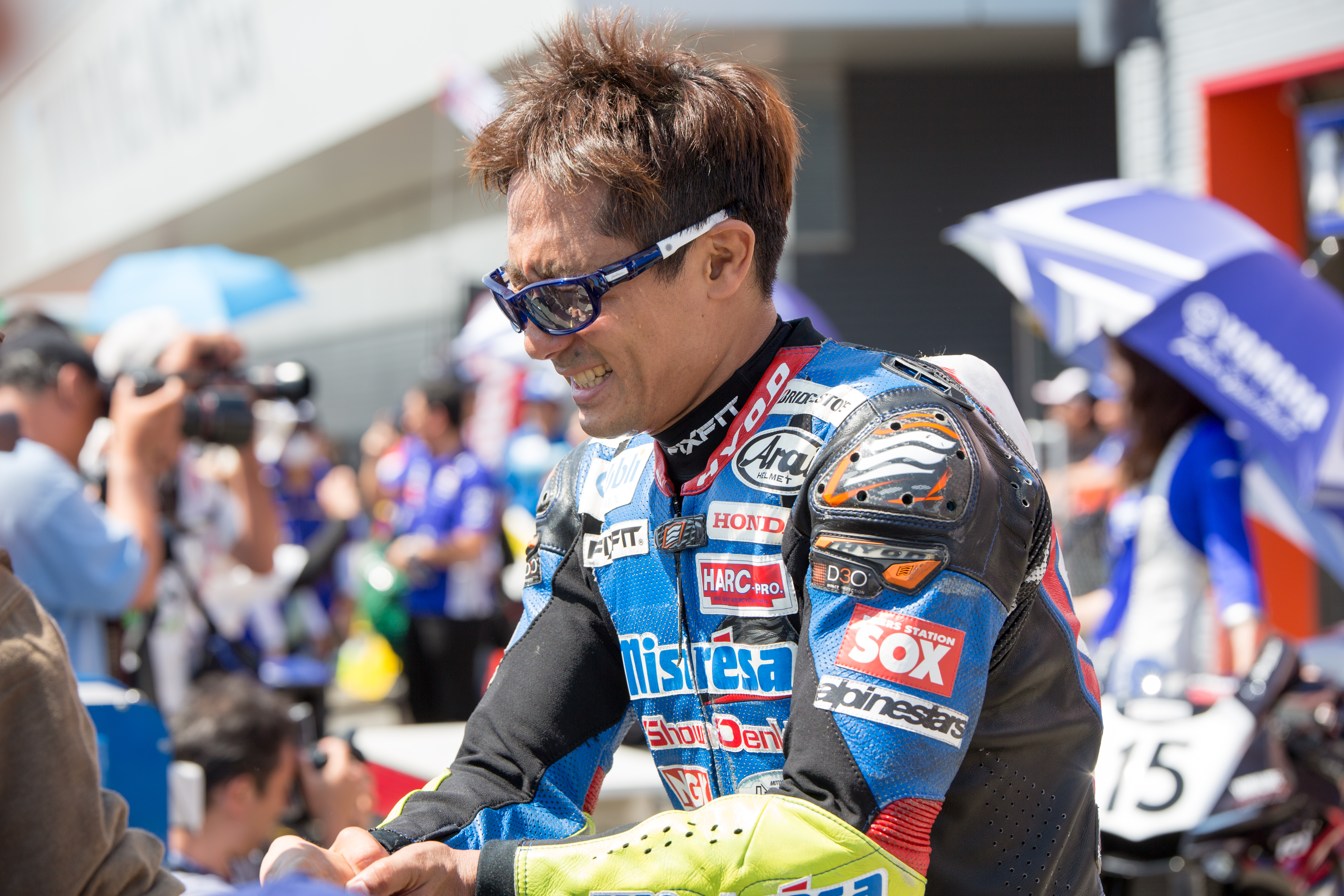
- Sekiguchi in 2016
- Nationality: Japanese
- Born: December 5, 1975 (age 50); Fuchu, Tokyo, Japan
- Current team: Sanmei Team Taro with SDG
- Bike number: 44
Motorcycle racing career statistics
Moto2 World Championship
Active years	2016
Manufacturers	TSR
2016 championship position	NC (0 pts)
Starts / Wins / Podiums / Poles / F. laps / Points; 1 / 0 / 0 / 0 / 0 / 0
250cc World Championship
Active years	1999–2002, 2004–2007
Manufacturers	Yamaha, Aprilia
2007 championship position	23rd (13 pts)
Starts / Wins / Podiums / Poles / F. laps / Points; 62 / 0 / 0 / 0 / 0 / 62

Taro Sekiguchi (Japanese: 関口 太郎, Hepburn: Sekiguchi Tarō; born December 5, 1975 in Fuchu, Tokyo, Japan) is a Japanese motorcycle road racer who competes in the JSB1000 class of the All Japan Road Race Championship for Sanmei Team Taro with SDG, aboard a BMW M1000RR. He was the MFJ All Japan Road Race GP250 champion in 2001 and the European 250cc champion in 2003.

== Career ==
Sekiguchi began his Grand Prix career competing in the 1999 250cc Japanese Grand Prix. He suffered a serious accident during the 2007 Czech Republic Grand Prix warm-up at Brno, where he struck Marco Simoncelli's crashed Gilera bike at full speed; he was airlifted to a hospital in Brno, where doctors confirmed he had a broken pelvis and two fractured ribs. After losing his Grand Prix ride, Sekiguchi returned to Japan, to the MFJ All Japan Road Race GP250 Championship. He moved into the MFJ All Japan Road Race ST600 Championship in 2009, before switching to the MFJ All Japan Road Race J-GP2 Championship, where he finished as runner-up in 2011, eighth in 2012, 12th in 2013, sixth in 2014 and third in 2015. In 2016, Sekiguchi appeared again in a Grand Prix as a wild card in the Moto2 class in his home race. In 2016, 2017 and 2018, he was again the J-GP2 runner-up and in 2019 he moved to the JSB1000 class, finishing 14th.

== Career statistic ==
=== Grand Prix motorcycle racing ===
==== Races by year ====
(key) (Races in bold indicate pole position; races in italics indicate fastest lap)

Year	Class	Bike	1	2	3	4	5	6	7	8	9	10	11	12	13	14	15	16	17	18	Pos	Pts
1999	250cc	Yamaha	MAL	JPN; Ret	ESP	FRA	ITA	CAT	NED	GBR	GER	CZE	IMO	VAL	AUS	RSA	BRA	ARG			NC	0
2000	250cc	Yamaha	RSA	MAL	JPN; 14	ESP	FRA	ITA	CAT	NED	GBR	GER	CZE	POR	VAL	BRA	PAC	AUS			35th	2
2001	250cc	Yamaha	JPN; 10	RSA	ESP	FRA	ITA	CAT; 13	NED	GBR	GER	CZE; 16	POR; Ret	VAL; 17	PAC; 9	AUS; 12	MAL	BRA			22nd	20
2002	250cc	Yamaha	JPN; Ret	RSA; Ret	ESP; 15	FRA; 12	ITA; Ret	CAT; 16	NED; 17	GBR; 14	GER; 16	CZE	POR	BRA	PAC	MAL	AUS	VAL			29th	7
2004	250cc	Yamaha	RSA; 22	ESP; 15	FRA; 21	ITA; 21	CAT; 18	NED; 19	BRA; 20	GER; 17	GBR; 19	CZE; Ret	POR; 17	JPN; 18	QAT; 13	MAL; Ret	AUS; Ret	VAL; Ret			31st	4
2005	250cc	Aprilia	ESP	POR	CHN	FRA	ITA	CAT	NED	GBR; Ret	GER; 18	CZE; Ret	JPN; 22	MAL; 10	QAT; 10	AUS; Ret	TUR; Ret	VAL; 15			21st	13
2006	250cc	Aprilia	ESP; DNS	QAT	TUR	CHN	FRA	ITA	CAT	NED	GBR	GER	CZE; 17	MAL; 13	AUS; 19	JPN; 18	POR; 18	VAL; 16			31st	3
2007	250cc	Aprilia	QAT; Ret	ESP; 17	TUR; Ret	CHN; 14	FRA; 14	ITA; 15	CAT; 15	GBR; 13	NED; 12	GER; 16	CZE; DNS	RSM	POR	JPN	AUS; 18	MAL; 18	VAL; 19		23rd	13
2016	Moto2	TSR	QAT	ARG	AME	SPA	FRA	ITA	CAT	NED	GER	AUT	CZE	GBR	RSM	ARA	JPN; 22	AUS	MAL	VAL	NC	0

=== Suzuka 8 Hours ===
Year	Class	Team	Co-riders	Bike	Pos
2025	**EWC**	(Japan) Sanmei Team Taro Plusone with SDG	(Japan) Yudai Kamei (Japan) Tatsuya Nakamura	BMW S1000RR	12th
2026	**EWC**	(Japan) Sanmei Team Taro Plusone with SDG	(Japan) Tatsuya Nakamura (Japan) Keisuke Tanaka	BMW M1000RR	43rd

=== All Japan Road Race Championship ===
==== Races by year ====
(key) (Races in bold indicate pole position; races in italics indicate fastest lap)

Year	Class	Bike	1	2	3	4	5	6	7	8	9	10	11	Pos	Pts
2024	JSB1000	BMW	SUZ; Ret	MOT1; 15	MOT2; 12	SUG1; 12	SUG2; 12	MOT; 8	AUT1; 10	AUT2; 11	OKA; 11	SUZ1; 12	SUZ2; 8	11th	55
2025	JSB1000	BMW	MOT; 9	SUG1; 10	SUG2; 8	MOT1; 8	MOT2; 9	AUT1; 10	AUT2; Ret	OKA; 11	SUZ1; 8	SUZ2; 10		9th	67
2026	JSB1000	BMW	MOT; 14	SUG1; 11	SUG2; 11	AUT1; 11	AUT2; 11	MOT1; 10	MOT2; 10	OKA; 12	SUZ1; 16	SUZ2; 16		12th	38

Sporting positions
Preceded by (Spain) Álvaro Molina	250 cc motorcycle European Champion; 2003	Succeeded by (Spain) Álvaro Molina
