= 2005 Valencian Community motorcycle Grand Prix =

2005 Valencian Community Grand Prix
Race details
- Race 17 of 17 races in the 2005 Grand Prix motorcycle racing season
- Date: 6 November 2005
- Official name: Gran Premio betandwin.com de la Comunitat Valenciana
- Location: Circuit Ricardo Tormo
- Course: Permanent racing facility; 4.005 km (2.489 mi)

MotoGP
Pole position
- Rider: (Spain) Sete Gibernau
- Time: 1:31.874
Fastest lap
- Rider: (Italy) Marco Melandri
- Time: 1:33.043 on lap 4
Podium
- First: (Italy) Marco Melandri
- Second: (United States) Nicky Hayden
- Third: (Italy) Valentino Rossi

250cc
Pole position
- Rider: (Spain) Daniel Pedrosa
- Time: 1:35.298
Fastest lap
- Rider: (Spain) Daniel Pedrosa
- Time: 1:35.792 on lap 17
Podium
- First: (Spain) Daniel Pedrosa
- Second: (Spain) Jorge Lorenzo
- Third: (Australia) Casey Stoner

125cc
Pole position
- Rider: (Spain) Sergio Gadea
- Time: 1:39.830
Fastest lap
- Rider: (Spain) Sergio Gadea
- Time: 1:40.286 on lap 14
Podium
- First: (Finland) Mika Kallio
- Second: (Hungary) Gábor Talmácsi
- Third: (Italy) Mattia Pasini

The 2005 Valencian Community motorcycle Grand Prix was the last round of the 2005 MotoGP Championship. It took place on the weekend of 4–6 November 2005 at the Circuit Ricardo Tormo.

== Race ==
This race featured a battle between Marco Melandri and Nicky Hayden, and a fightback to third place from a bad qualifying from Valentino Rossi, who by then was already crowned world champion.

Before the start of the weekend, the Factory Yamaha Team had unveiled a special, one-off 'retro' livery to commemorate Yamaha's fiftieth anniversary and their very successful year in racing, replacing their main sponsor and its colours (Gauloises and dark blue) with the traditional white with red and black blocks/stripes. They ran a similar livery before at the United States round but that livery consisted of yellow instead of white.

After sixteen rounds, Valentino Rossi has already won the title at the Malaysian round. Rossi has since then increased his title lead to 351 points. Second is Marco Melandri with 195 points and a close third is Nicky Hayden with 186 points.

On Saturday, Sete Gibernau clinched his the final pole position of the season - his fifth - with a time of 1:31.874. Second is Marco Melandri who is +0.237 seconds behind and third is Nicky Hayden who is +0.343 seconds behind. The second row of the grid consists out of Carlos Checa in fourth place, Max Biaggi in fifth place and Colin Edwards in sixth place. World champion Valentino Rossi had a poor qualifying result after a crash and starts a lowly fifteenth. Suzuki test rider Nobuatsu Aoki replaces Kenny Roberts Jr. who is still recovering from a broken left wrist he sustained after a big highside during Friday practice at the Australian round, having then also confirmed his split with the team shortly after.

== MotoGP classification ==
Pos.	No.	Rider	Team	Manufacturer	Laps	Time/Retired	Grid	Points
1	33	(Italy) Marco Melandri	Movistar Honda MotoGP	Honda	30	46:58.152	2	25
2	69	(United States) Nicky Hayden	Repsol Honda Team	Honda	30	+0.097	3	20
3	46	(Italy) Valentino Rossi	Yamaha Factory Racing	Yamaha	30	+2.959	15	16
4	7	(Spain) Carlos Checa	Ducati Marlboro Team	Ducati	30	+18.718	4	13
5	4	(Brazil) Alex Barros	Camel Honda	Honda	30	+20.706	8	11
6	3	(Italy) Max Biaggi	Repsol Honda Team	Honda	30	+21.254	5	10
7	65	(Italy) Loris Capirossi	Ducati Marlboro Team	Ducati	30	+23.142	7	9
8	5	(United States) Colin Edwards	Yamaha Factory Racing	Yamaha	30	+25.678	6	8
9	6	(Japan) Makoto Tamada	Konica Minolta Honda	Honda	30	+36.710	10	7
10	24	(Spain) Toni Elías	Fortuna Yamaha Team	Yamaha	30	+39.116	13	6
11	56	(Japan) Shinya Nakano	Kawasaki Racing Team	Kawasaki	30	+41.136	9	5
12	54	(Japan) Ryuichi Kiyonari	Camel Honda	Honda	30	+45.691	16	4
13	21	(United States) John Hopkins	Team Suzuki MotoGP	Suzuki	30	+46.507	11	3
14	66	(Germany) Alex Hofmann	Kawasaki Racing Team	Kawasaki	30	+49.856	12	2
15	11	(Spain) Rubén Xaus	Fortuna Yamaha Team	Yamaha	30	+1:19.443	17	1
16	27	(Italy) Franco Battaini	Blata WCM	Blata	29	+1 lap	21	
Ret	80	(United States) Kurtis Roberts	Team Roberts	Proton KR	16	Retirement	20	
Ret	77	(United Kingdom) James Ellison	Blata WCM	Blata	15	Retirement	19	
Ret	9	(Japan) Nobuatsu Aoki	Team Suzuki MotoGP	Suzuki	8	Retirement	14	
Ret	15	(Spain) Sete Gibernau	Movistar Honda MotoGP	Honda	3	Retirement	1	
Ret	44	(Italy) Roberto Rolfo	Team d'Antin Pramac	Ducati	0	Accident	18	

== 250 cc classification ==
Pos.	No.	Rider	Manufacturer	Laps	Time/Retired	Grid	Points
1	1	(Spain) Daniel Pedrosa	Honda	27	43:33.395	1	25
2	48	(Spain) Jorge Lorenzo	Honda	27	+3.448	4	20
3	27	(Australia) Casey Stoner	Aprilia	27	+14.372	7	16
4	5	(San Marino) Alex de Angelis	Aprilia	27	+17.771	3	13
5	80	(Spain) Héctor Barberá	Honda	27	+26.233	2	11
6	73	(Japan) Hiroshi Aoyama	Honda	27	+31.244	6	10
7	55	(Japan) Yuki Takahashi	Honda	27	+35.518	8	9
8	7	(France) Randy de Puniet	Aprilia	27	+36.488	9	8
9	34	(Italy) Andrea Dovizioso	Honda	27	+43.129	5	7
10	15	(Italy) Roberto Locatelli	Aprilia	27	+43.960	15	6
11	6	(Spain) Alex Debón	Honda	27	+55.494	12	5
12	96	(Czech Republic) Jakub Smrž	Honda	27	+57.265	10	4
13	36	(Colombia) Martín Cárdenas	Aprilia	27	+58.185	18	3
14	50	(France) Sylvain Guintoli	Aprilia	27	+58.545	16	2
15	44	(Japan) Taro Sekiguchi	Aprilia	27	+1:01.485	13	1
16	57	(United Kingdom) Chaz Davies	Aprilia	27	+1:12.112	19	
17	17	(Germany) Steve Jenkner	Aprilia	27	+1:23.475	17	
18	25	(Italy) Alex Baldolini	Aprilia	27	+1:30.535	14	
19	32	(Italy) Mirko Giansanti	Aprilia	27	+1:31.957	26	
20	56	(France) Mathieu Gines	Aprilia	26	+1 lap	22	
21	61	(China) Li Zheng Peng	Aprilia	26	+1 lap	29	
Ret	8	(Italy) Andrea Ballerini	Aprilia	26	Retirement	20	
Ret	24	(Italy) Simone Corsi	Aprilia	26	Accident	24	
Ret	28	(Germany) Dirk Heidolf	Honda	18	Accident	11	
Ret	63	(France) Erwan Nigon	Yamaha	18	Retirement	27	
Ret	60	(China) Wang Zhu	Aprilia	15	Retirement	28	
Ret	33	(Spain) Arturo Tizón	Honda	9	Retirement	21	
Ret	41	(Spain) Álvaro Molina	Aprilia	6	Accident	23	
Ret	21	(France) Arnaud Vincent	Fantic	6	Accident	25	
DNS	19	(Argentina) Sebastián Porto	Aprilia		Did not start		
DNQ	23	(Sweden) Nicklas Cajback	Yamaha		Did not qualify		
DNQ	20	(Italy) Gabriele Ferro	Fantic		Did not qualify		

== 125 cc classification ==
Pos.	No.	Rider	Manufacturer	Laps	Time/Retired	Grid	Points
1	36	(Finland) Mika Kallio	KTM	24	40:26.640	3	25
2	14	(Hungary) Gábor Talmácsi	KTM	24	+0.237	8	20
3	75	(Italy) Mattia Pasini	Aprilia	24	+0.367	2	16
4	55	(Spain) Héctor Faubel	Aprilia	24	+12.401	6	13
5	58	(Italy) Marco Simoncelli	Aprilia	24	+17.009	11	11
6	71	(Japan) Tomoyoshi Koyama	Honda	24	+20.635	9	10
7	32	(Italy) Fabrizio Lai	Honda	24	+20.670	5	9
8	60	(Spain) Julián Simón	KTM	24	+20.809	12	8
9	12	(Switzerland) Thomas Lüthi	Honda	24	+23.517	4	7
10	22	(Spain) Pablo Nieto	Derbi	24	+32.805	24	6
11	41	(Spain) Aleix Espargaró	Honda	24	+35.930	14	5
12	19	(Spain) Álvaro Bautista	Honda	24	+36.015	22	4
13	35	(Italy) Raffaele De Rosa	Aprilia	24	+43.436	21	3
14	6	(Spain) Joan Olivé	Aprilia	24	+47.651	27	2
15	29	(Italy) Andrea Iannone	Aprilia	24	+49.387	16	1
16	18	(Spain) Nicolás Terol	Derbi	24	+53.187	26	
17	28	(Spain) Jordi Carchano	Aprilia	24	+57.976	23	
18	51	(Spain) Enrique Jerez	Derbi	24	+1:00.860	36	
19	43	(Spain) Manuel Hernández	Honda	24	+1:01.055	19	
20	27	(Spain) Mateo Túnez	Aprilia	24	+1:06.276	28	
21	45	(Hungary) Imre Tóth	Aprilia	24	+1:06.915	31	
22	42	(Italy) Gioele Pellino	Malaguti	24	+1:08.479	34	
23	26	(Switzerland) Vincent Braillard	Aprilia	24	+1:13.289	38	
24	59	(Spain) Esteve Rabat	Honda	24	+1:22.682	35	
25	84	(Spain) Julián Miralles	Aprilia	24	+1:23.174	37	
26	31	(Germany) Sascha Hommel	Honda	24	+1:39.732	39	
Ret	7	(France) Alexis Masbou	Honda	22	Accident	18	
Ret	33	(Spain) Sergio Gadea	Aprilia	18	Accident	1	
Ret	11	(Germany) Sandro Cortese	Honda	17	Accident	7	
Ret	89	(France) Jules Cluzel	Malaguti	17	Accident	17	
Ret	54	(San Marino) Manuel Poggiali	Gilera	16	Accident	15	
Ret	8	(Italy) Lorenzo Zanetti	Aprilia	14	Accident	20	
Ret	52	(Czech Republic) Lukáš Pešek	Derbi	14	Accident	13	
Ret	49	(Spain) Daniel Sáez	Aprilia	14	Retirement	32	
Ret	44	(Czech Republic) Karel Abraham	Aprilia	10	Accident	33	
Ret	10	(Italy) Federico Sandi	Honda	6	Accident	25	
Ret	63	(France) Mike Di Meglio	Honda	5	Accident	10	
Ret	25	(Germany) Dario Giuseppetti	Aprilia	0	Accident	30	
Ret	48	(Spain) David Bonache	Honda	0	Accident	29	

== Championship standings after the race (MotoGP) ==
Below are the standings for the top five riders and constructors after round seventeen has concluded.

Riders' Championship standings

Pos.	Rider	Points
1	(Italy) Valentino Rossi	367
2	(Italy) Marco Melandri	220
3	(United States) Nicky Hayden	206
4	(United States) Colin Edwards	179
5	(Italy) Max Biaggi	173

Constructors' Championship standings

Pos.	Constructor	Points
1	(Japan) Yamaha	381
2	(Japan) Honda	341
3	(Italy) Ducati	202
4	(Japan) Kawasaki	126
5	(Japan) Suzuki	100

- Note: Only the top five positions are included for both sets of standings.

Previous race: 2005 Turkish Grand Prix	FIM Grand Prix World Championship; 2005 season	Next race: 2006 Spanish Grand Prix
Previous race: 2004 Valencian Grand Prix	Valencian Community motorcycle Grand Prix	Next race: 2006 Valencian Grand Prix
