= Fabrizio Lai =

Italian motorcycle racer

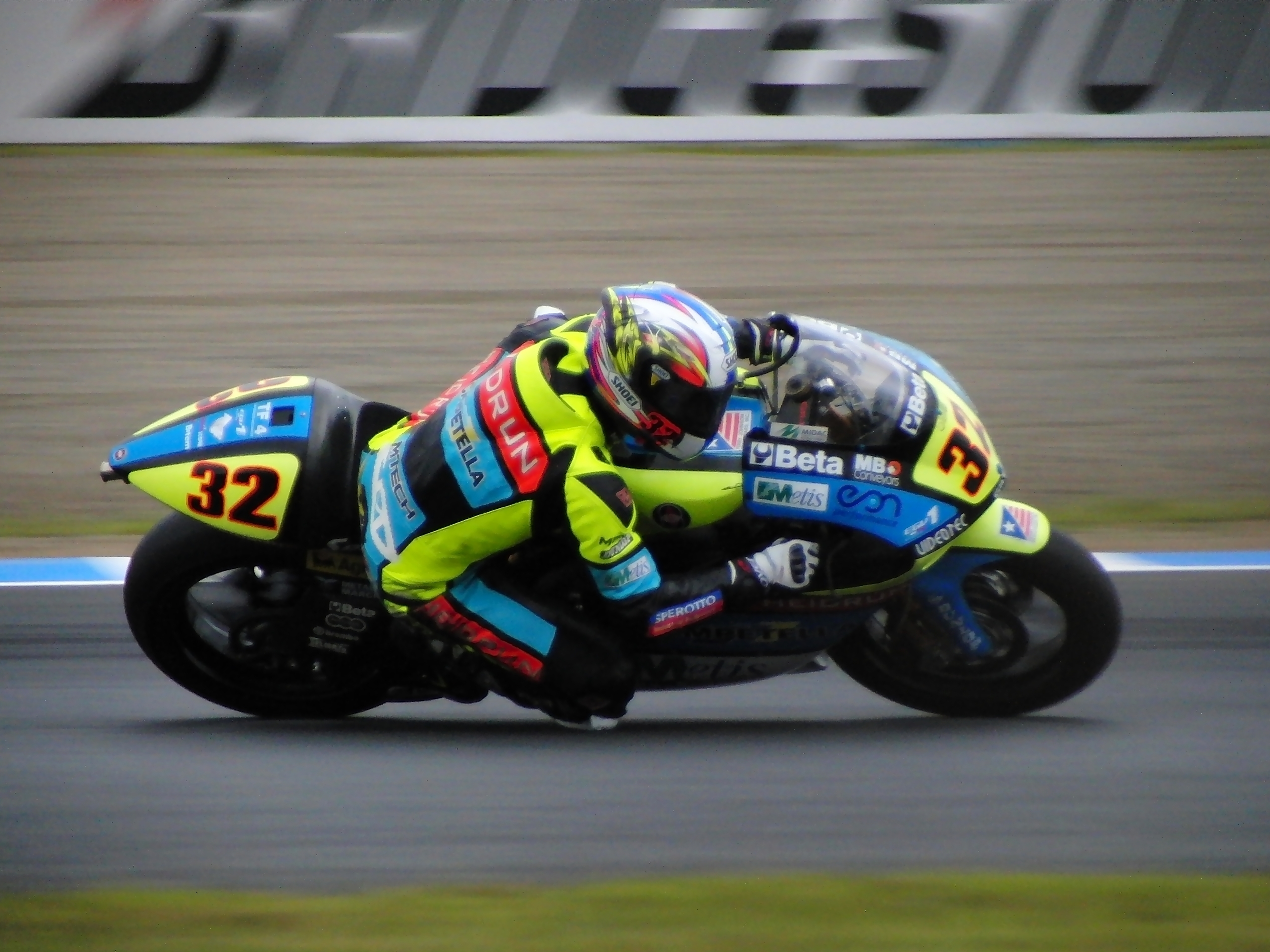
- Lai at the 2008 Japanese Grand Prix
- Nationality: Italian
- Current team: Italian Pilots School
- Bike number: 32
Motorcycle racing career statistics
Grand Prix motorcycle racing
Active years	2001 - 2008
First race	2001 125cc Valencia Grand Prix
Last race	2008 250cc Valencia Grand Prix
Team(s)	Malaguti, Gilera, Honda, Aprilia, Rieju
Championships	0
Starts / Wins / Podiums / Poles / F. laps / Points; 98 / 0 / 5 / 0 / 1 / 371

Fabrizio Lai (born 14 December 1978 in Rho) is a former Grand Prix motorcycle road racer from Italy. He competed in the CIV Superbike Championship, aboard a MV Agusta F4.

== Career ==
Lai won the European Championship twice in succession in 1996 and 1997 while still a teenager, before winning the Italian championship in 2002. He has competed in the 125 cc World Championship since 2001, first as a wild card rider, and full-time since the 2003 season on a Malaguti. Lai achieved his first podium finish during the 2004 season as runner-up at Motegi on a Gilera, He finished sixth overall in 2005 and 11th in 2006 as a Honda rider. For 2007, he switched to the Campetella Racing Aprilia team.

== Career statistics ==
=== Career highlights ===
- 1999: 14th, European 125cc Championship (Honda RS125R
- 2000: 4th, European 125cc Championship (Honda RS125R)
- 2002: 16th, European 125cc Championship (Engineseng)
- 2010: 15th, Italian CIV Supersport 600 Championship (Honda CBR600RR)
- 2011: 7th, Italian CIV Superbike Championship (Honda CBR1000RR)
- 2012: 4th, Italian CIV Superbike Championship (Ducati 1098)
- 2013: 13th, Italian CIV Superbike Championship (Kawasaki ZX-10R)

=== Grand Prix motorcycle racing ===
==== Races by year ====
(key) (Races in bold indicate pole position, races in italics indicate fastest lap)

Year	Class	Bike	1	2	3	4	5	6	7	8	9	10	11	12	13	14	15	16	17	Pos	Pts
2001	125cc	Rieju	JPN	RSA	SPA	FRA	ITA	CAT	NED	GBR	GER	CZE	POR	VAL; Ret	PAC	AUS	MAL	BRA		NC	0
2002	125cc	Honda	JPN	RSA	SPA	FRA	ITA	CAT	NED; 23	GBR; 14	GER	CZE	POR	BRA	PAC	MAL	AUS	VAL		34th	2
2003	125cc	Malaguti	JPN; 16	RSA; 18	SPA; 23	FRA; Ret	ITA; Ret	CAT; 19	NED; 14	GBR; Ret	GER; 15	CZE; 18	POR; 12	BRA; 24	PAC; 18	MAL; 17	AUS; 13	VAL; 18		25th	10
2004	125cc	Gilera	RSA; 21	SPA; 13	FRA; 20	ITA; Ret	CAT; DNS	NED; DNS	BRA; Ret	GER; Ret	GBR; 14	CZE; 15	POR; 12	JPN; 2	QAT; 5	MAL; 5	AUS; Ret	VAL; 15		16th	53
2005	125cc	Honda	SPA; 3	POR; 4	CHN; 2	FRA; Ret	ITA; 8	CAT; 10	NED; 18	GBR; 3	GER; 7	CZE; 6	JPN; 10	MAL; 7	QAT; 10	AUS; 12	TUR; 7	VAL; 7		6th	141
2006	125cc	Honda	SPA; Ret	QAT; 14	TUR; 13	CHN; 8	FRA; 3	ITA; 11	CAT; 10	NED; Ret	GBR; 11	GER; 11	CZE; 10	MAL; 11	AUS; 8	JPN; 11	POR; 7	VAL; Ret		11th	83
2007	250cc	Aprilia	QAT; 12	SPA; 11	TUR; 10	CHN; 10	FRA; 12	ITA; 13	CAT; Ret	GBR; 11	NED; 11	GER; 18	CZE; 12	RSM; Ret	POR; 9	JPN; Ret	AUS; 17	MAL; 20	VAL; Ret	14th	49
2008	250cc	Gilera	QAT; 12	SPA; Ret	POR; Ret	CHN; 14	FRA; Ret	ITA; 14	CAT; 15	GBR; 17	NED; 13	GER; 12	CZE; 17	SMR; 11	INP; C	JPN; 15	AUS; 10	MAL; 11	VAL; Ret	18th	33

=== Supersport World Championship ===
==== Races by year ====
(key) (Races in bold indicate pole position; races in italics indicate fastest lap)

Year	Bike	1	2	3	4	5	6	7	8	9	10	11	12	13	14	Pos	Pts
2009	Honda	AUS; 24	QAT; 22	SPA; 21	NED; 21	ITA; 21	RSA; 20	USA	SMR	GBR	CZE	GER	ITA	FRA	POR	NC	0
2013	Honda	AUS	SPA	NED	ITA	GBR	POR	ITA; Ret	RUS	GBR	GER	TUR	FRA	SPA		NC	0

=== Superbike World Championship ===
==== Races by year ====
(key) (Races in bold indicate pole position) (Races in italics indicate fastest lap)

Year	Bike	1		2		3		4		5		6		7		8		9		10		11		12		13		14		Pos	Pts
Year	Bike	R1	R2	R1	R2	R1	R2	R1	R2	R1	R2	R1	R2	R1	R2	R1	R2	R1	R2	R1	R2	R1	R2	R1	R2	R1	R2	R1	R2	Pos	Pts
2010	Honda	AUS	AUS	POR	POR	SPA	SPA	NED	NED	ITA	ITA	RSA	RSA	USA	USA	SMR	SMR	CZE	CZE	GBR	GBR	GER; Ret	GER; 18	ITA; 19	ITA; 14	FRA; 16	FRA; Ret			28th	2
2011	Honda	AUS	AUS	EUR	EUR	NED	NED	ITA; 18	ITA; 15	USA	USA	SMR	SMR	SPA	SPA	CZE	CZE	GBR; Ret	GBR; 16	GER	GER	ITA	ITA	FRA	FRA	POR	POR			34th	1
2013	Kawasaki	AUS	AUS	SPA	SPA	NED	NED	ITA; 13	ITA; 11	GBR	GBR	POR	POR	ITA	ITA	RUS	RUS	GBR	GBR	GER	GER	TUR	TUR	USA	USA					25th	11
2013	Ducati																									FRA; 14	FRA; 15	SPA	SPA	25th	11

=== CIV Championship (Campionato Italiano Velocita) ===
==== Races by year ====
(key) (Races in bold indicate pole position; races in italics indicate fastest lap)

Year	Class	Bike	1	2	3	4	5	Pos	Pts
2001	125cc	Honda	MIS1; 15	MON; 6	VAL; 6	MIS2; 9	MIS3; 2	5th	47
2002	125cc	Engineseng	**IMO**; 1	**VAL**; 1	**MUG**; 1	MIS1; 2	MIS2; 1	1st	100 (120)
2003	125cc	Malaguti	MIS1; 2	**MUG1**; 3	**MIS1**; 1	**MUG2**; 1	**VAL**; 1	1st	111
