= Sascha Hommel =

German motorcycle racer

- Nationality: German
- Born: 25 February 1990 (age 36); Reichenbach, Germany
- Website: saschahommel.de
Motorcycle racing career statistics
Moto2 World Championship
Active years	2010
Manufacturers	Kalex
Starts / Wins / Podiums / Poles / F. laps / Points; 1 / 0 / 0 / 0 / 0 / 0
125cc World Championship
Active years	2005
Manufacturers	Malaguti, Honda
Starts / Wins / Podiums / Poles / F. laps / Points; 9 / 0 / 0 / 0 / 0 / 0
Supersport World Championship
Active years	2007
Manufacturers	Honda
Starts / Wins / Podiums / Poles / F. laps / Points; 1 / 0 / 0 / 0 / 0 / 0

Sascha Hommel (born 25 February 1990) is a German motorcycle racer. He won the IDM Supersport Championship in 2009 and he has also competed in the 125cc World Championship, the Moto2 World Championship and the Supersport World Championship.

== Career statistics ==
=== Grand Prix motorcycle racing ===
==== By season ====
Season	Class	Motorcycle	Team	Race	Win	Podium	Pole	FLap	Pts	Plcd
2005	125cc	Malaguti	Malaguti Reparto Corse	9	0	0	0	0	0	NC
2005	125cc	Honda	Arie Molenaar Racing	9	0	0	0	0	0	NC
2010	Moto2	Kalex	MGM Racing Performance MC	1	0	0	0	0	0	NC
Total				10	0	0	0	0	0	

==== Races by year ====
(key)

Year	Class	Bike	1	2	3	4	5	6	7	8	9	10	11	12	13	14	15	16	17	Pos.	Pts
2005	125cc	Malaguti	SPA; 24	POR; DNQ	CHN; DNS	FRA	ITA	CAT	NED	GBR	GER; Ret	CZE; 23	JPN; Ret	MAL; 30						NC	0
2005	125cc	Honda													QAT; Ret	AUS; Ret	TUR; 26	VAL; 26		NC	0
2010	Moto2	Kalex	QAT	SPA	FRA	ITA	GBR	NED	CAT	GER; 23	CZE	INP	RSM	ARA	JPN	MAL	AUS	POR	VAL	NC	0

=== Supersport World Championship ===
==== Races by year ====
(key)

Year	Bike	1	2	3	4	5	6	7	8	9	10	11	12	13	Pos.	Pts
2007	Honda	QAT	AUS	EUR	SPA	NED	ITA	GBR	SMR; 23	CZE	GBR	GER	ITA	FRA	NC	0
