= Rubén Xaus =

Spanish motorcycle road racer (born 1979)

- Xaus in 2006
- Nationality: Spanish
- Born: 18 February 1978 (age 48); Sant Cugat del Vallès, Catalunya, Spain
- Website: rubenxaus.net

Rubén Xaus Moreno (born 18 February 1978 in Barcelona, Catalonia, Spain) is a Spanish retired motorcycle road racer. During his career, he competed in both the Superbike World Championship and the MotoGP. He is nicknamed 'Spider-Man', as his lanky frame leads him to hang over the bike in an unusual way.

== Early years ==
Xaus' father, who competed in amateur mountain bicycle races, gave him his first motorcycle at the age of five, a Montesa 25cc. At the age of 14, he was racing dirt-bikes, but his father convinced him to turn his attentions towards road racing. Xaus took part in the 125cc Catalan Championship, the 125cc Solo Moto Criterium, and that same year he took victory in the 80cc Catalonia Supermoto Championship.

In 1994, Xaus competed in the Open Ducados Supersport series in Spain – finishing 17th place, improving to third the following year. In 1995, he entered the FIM Thunderbike trophy and contested four 250cc Grand Prix. Xaus finished sixth in Thunderbike in 1996, moving to World Supersport in 1997 taking 17th overall. In 1997, he also won the 24 Hours of Catalunya.

In 1998, Xaus rode in the German Pro-Superbike series, taking sixth place overall. In 1999, he finished fifth in the Supersport World Championship, taking his first ever victory at Misano. In 2000, he rode one of the official Ducati factory team Supersport bikes, finishing seventh and taking one victory.

== Superbikes ==
For 2001, Xaus moved to the factory Ducati Superbike team in partnership with then-champion Troy Bayliss. He struggled early in the season, with a best result of fifth from the first eight meetings. However, in race 2 at Oschersleben, he became the first Spaniard ever to take victory in the Superbike World Championship. A pair of seconds at Assen (helping Bayliss to clinch the title) and a second win at Imola gave him sixth in the championship. Sixth place in 2002 was followed by 15 podiums and seven victories in 2003, finishing runner up to teammate Neil Hodgson.

== MotoGP ==
Xaus made his move into the MotoGP World Championship in 2004 as part of the satellite D'Antin Ducati team. The team was grossly under funded and could not afford testing time, but Xaus adapted better to the situation than teammate Hodgson. Consistent points-scoring performances and a first podium at Qatar saw him snap up the ‘Rookie of the Year’ title and 11th place overall in the championship standings. In 2005, he moved to the Fortuna Yamaha Team to ride alongside his friend Toni Elías. But a more pronounced power delivery and difficult chassis and Xaus's charging/forced riding style meant he looked a different rider to the one of 2004. He crashed numerous times, finishing 16th overall with a best finish of tenth .

=== By season ===
Season	Class	Moto	Race	Win	Pod	Pole	FLap	Pts	Plcd	WCh
2004	MotoGP	GP4	16	0	1	0	0	77	11th	–
2005	MotoGP	Yamaha YZR-M1	16	0	0	0	0	52	16th	–
Total			32	0	1	0	0	129		0

== Return to Superbikes ==
For 2006, Xaus returned to the Superbike World Championship, with a ride for the new Italian satellite Ducati team Sterilgarda Berik, alongside team owner Marco Borciani. He twice set the fastest lap, but his fast charges often ended in crashes, and he was only 14th overall.

Xaus ended the 2007 season sixth with a total 201 points, directly behind the former world champion Troy Corser, scoring the team's first victory in Valencia.

For 2008, Xaus was joined by Max Biaggi on a Ducati 1098R for Sterilgarda-GoEleven, under the team management of Borciani. He finished second in race 2 at the season-opening event in Qatar and took a victory at Misano in Race 2 in front of Biaggi and Bayliss, but has had no further podiums. At Donington Park, he believed he had finished third in a race stopped by heavy rain, but found out immediately before the podium celebration that he had been disqualified for not returning to the pits quickly enough after crashing immediately before the race was stopped. He then refused to leave the podium and verbally assaulted the marshals, including the rider who inherited the third spot on the podium - his team-mate Max Biaggi. He finished tenth in the standings.

On 26 June 2008, Xaus signed to ride the BMW S1000RR bike for the factory BMW Motorrad team in the 2009 WSB Championship.

== Personal data ==
On 16 March 2007, Xaus married long-term partner Mariona. The wedding was held in Andorra, where the couple live with their daughter Julia Xaus, who was born in November 2006. In January 2009, they had their second daughter Paula Xaus.

Xaus' hobbies include mountain biking, snowboarding and golf. He is 183 cm tall and weighs 74 kg.

== Currently ==
In 2024, Xaus introduced BRL Europe https://www.baggereurope.com/ where he manages the series and also competes in it using bagger motorcycles.

== Career statistics ==
=== Grand Prix motorcycle racing ===
==== Races by year ====
(key) (Races in bold indicate pole position, races in italics indicate fastest lap)

Year	Class	Bike	1	2	3	4	5	6	7	8	9	10	11	12	13	14	15	16	17	Pos	Pts
1995	250cc	Honda	AUS	MAL	JPN	SPA	GER	ITA	NED	FRA	GBR; Ret	CZE; 23	BRA; 16	ARG; Ret	EUR; Ret					NC	0
2004	MotoGP	Ducati	RSA; Ret	ESP; Ret	FRA; 14	ITA; 5	CAT; 6	NED; 7	BRA; 12	GER; 11	GBR; 11	CZE; Ret	POR; Ret	JPN; 9	QAT; 3	MAL; 13	AUS; 11	VAL; Ret		11th	77
2005	MotoGP	Yamaha	SPA; 18	POR; 10	CHN; 10	FRA; 12	ITA; 14	CAT; 10	NED; 12	USA; 11	GBR; Ret	GER; 13	CZE; 18	JPN; 10	MAL; 15	QAT; 14	AUS; 12	TUR; 14	VAL; 15	16th	52

=== Supersport World Championship ===
==== Races by year ====
Year	Team	1	2	3	4	5	6	7	8	9	10	11	Pos.	Pts
1997	Honda	SMR; Ret	GBR; Ret	GER; 19	ITA; 14	EUR; 12	AUT; 15	NED; Ret	GER; DNS	SPA; 15	JPN; 15	INA; 5	17th	20
1999	Yamaha	**RSA**; Ret	GBR; Ret	SPA; Ret	ITA; 2	GER; Ret	SMR; 1	USA; 23	EUR; 2	**AUT**; Ret	NED; 3	GER; 2	5th	101
2000	Ducati	**AUS**; 23	JPN; 18	GBR; Ret	**ITA**; 6	GER; 2	SMR; Ret	SPA; 18	EUR; 7	NED; 1	GER; 4	GBR; Ret	7th	77

=== Superbike World Championship ===
==== Races by year ====
(key) (Races in bold indicate pole position) (Races in italics indicate fastest lap)

Year	Make	1		2		3		4		5		6		7		8		9		10		11		12		13		14		Pos.	Pts
Year	Make	R1	R2	R1	R2	R1	R2	R1	R2	R1	R2	R1	R2	R1	R2	R1	R2	R1	R2	R1	R2	R1	R2	R1	R2	R1	R2	R1	R2	Pos.	Pts
1998	Suzuki	AUS	AUS	GBR	GBR	ITA	ITA	SPA	SPA	GER; 15	GER; 16	SMR	SMR	RSA	RSA	USA	USA	EUR	EUR	AUT	AUT	NED	NED	JPN	JPN					51st	1
2001	Ducati	SPA; Ret	SPA; 8	RSA; 9	RSA; 5	AUS; Ret	AUS; C	JPN; 18	JPN; 22	ITA; Ret	ITA; 6	GBR; 7	GBR; 10	GER; 19	GER; 6	SMR; 10	SMR; 6	USA; 7	USA; 10	EUR; 6	EUR; 12	GER; 2	GER; 1	NED; 2	NED; 2	ITA; 1	ITA; 2			6th	236
2002	Ducati	SPA; 5	SPA; Ret	AUS; 3	AUS; 3	RSA; 3	RSA; 2	JPN; Ret	JPN; 9	ITA; 6	ITA; Ret	GBR; 8	GBR; 3	GER; 3	GER; 3	SMR; Ret	SMR; Ret	USA; 2	USA; 19	GBR; 5	GBR; 6	GER; Ret	GER; 5	NED; 4	NED; Ret	ITA; 3	ITA; 3			6th	249
2003	Ducati	SPA; 2	SPA; 2	AUS; 2	AUS; 2	JPN; 4	JPN; 4	ITA; 7	ITA; Ret	GER; Ret	GER; 5	GBR; 3	GBR; 3	SMR; 1	SMR; 1	USA; Ret	USA; 1	GBR; Ret	GBR; 4	NED; 1	NED; 2	**ITA**; 1	**ITA**; 1	FRA; 2	FRA; 1					**2nd**	**386**
2006	Ducati	QAT; 15	QAT; 10	AUS; 7	AUS; 8	SPA; 7	SPA; Ret	ITA; Ret	ITA; 15	EUR; 4	EUR; 7	SMR; 9	SMR; 9	CZE; Ret	CZE; 14	GBR; 10	GBR; 10	NED; Ret	NED; 5	GER; 15	GER; 9	ITA; Ret	ITA; Ret	FRA; DNS	FRA					14th	103
2007	Ducati	QAT; 10	QAT; 9	AUS; 7	AUS; 6	EUR; Ret	EUR; 4	SPA; 1	SPA; 4	NED; 3	NED; Ret	ITA; 12	ITA; 13	GBR; 9	GBR; C	SMR; 8	SMR; 7	CZE; 12	CZE; 10	GBR; 4	GBR; 6	GER; 12	GER; 6	ITA; Ret	ITA; 6	FRA; 8	FRA; 10			6th	201
2008	Ducati	QAT; 4	QAT; 2	AUS; 4	AUS; 4	SPA; Ret	SPA; 7	NED; 16	NED; 4	ITA; Ret	ITA; 7	USA; 14	USA; Ret	GER; 6	GER; 8	SMR; 4	SMR; 1	CZE; Ret	CZE; Ret	GBR; DNS	GBR; DNS	EUR; Ret	EUR; 8	ITA; Ret	ITA; 12	FRA; Ret	FRA; 5	POR; 9	POR; Ret	10th	178
2009	BMW	AUS; 19	AUS; 11	QAT; 13	QAT; 10	SPA; 13	SPA; 16	NED; 14	NED; 11	ITA; 7	ITA; 9	RSA; Ret	RSA; Ret	USA; 21	USA; 16	SMR; 14	SMR; 16	GBR; 15	GBR; 9	CZE; Ret	CZE; DNS	GER	GER	ITA; 12	ITA; 13	FRA; 11	FRA; 12	POR; 8	POR; Ret	17th	74
2010	BMW	AUS; DNS	AUS; DNS	POR; 10	POR; 12	SPA; 12	SPA; 11	NED; Ret	NED; 10	ITA; 6	ITA; Ret	RSA; 14	RSA; 11	USA; 10	USA; 11	SMR; Ret	SMR; Ret	CZE; 5	CZE; Ret	GBR; 17	GBR; 11	GER; 7	GER; 9	ITA; 12	ITA; 9	FRA; Ret	FRA; DNS			15th	96
2011	Honda	AUS; 16	AUS; 10	EUR; 12	EUR; 10	NED; 8	NED; 14	ITA; 15	ITA; 12	USA; Ret	USA; 18	SMR; 11	SMR; 8	SPA; 16	SPA; Ret	CZE; Ret	CZE; DNS	GBR	GBR	GER	GER	ITA; 17	ITA; 11	FRA; DNS	FRA; DNS	POR	POR			17th	49

Sporting positions
Preceded by Régis Laconi; Yvan Muller; Gilles Panizzi	Race of Champions; Nations' Cup; 2001 with: Fernando Alonso; Jesús Puras	Succeeded by Colin Edwards; Jeff Gordon; Jimmie Johnson
