= 2005 Czech Republic motorcycle Grand Prix =

2005 Czech Republic Grand Prix
Race details
- Race 11 of 17 races in the 2005 Grand Prix motorcycle racing season
- Date: 28 August 2005
- Official name: Gauloises Grand Prix České republiky
- Location: Brno Circuit
- Course: Permanent racing facility; 5.403 km (3.357 mi)

MotoGP
Pole position
- Rider: (Spain) Sete Gibernau
- Time: 1:57.504
Fastest lap
- Rider: (Italy) Valentino Rossi
- Time: 1:58.787 on lap 6
Podium
- First: (Italy) Valentino Rossi
- Second: (Italy) Loris Capirossi
- Third: (Italy) Max Biaggi

250cc
Pole position
- Rider: (Spain) Jorge Lorenzo
- Time: 2:02.261
Fastest lap
- Rider: (Spain) Daniel Pedrosa
- Time: 2:02.554 on lap 16
Podium
- First: (Spain) Daniel Pedrosa
- Second: (Spain) Jorge Lorenzo
- Third: (Australia) Casey Stoner

125cc
Pole position
- Rider: (Switzerland) Thomas Lüthi
- Time: 2:08.638
Fastest lap
- Rider: (Spain) Sergio Gadea
- Time: 2:08.931 on lap 5
Podium
- First: (Switzerland) Thomas Lüthi
- Second: (Finland) Mika Kallio
- Third: (Italy) Marco Simoncelli

The 2005 Czech Republic motorcycle Grand Prix was the eleventh round of the 2005 MotoGP Championship. It took place on the weekend of 26–28 August 2005 at the Brno Circuit located in Brno, Czech Republic.

== MotoGP classification ==
| Pos. | No. | Rider | Team | Manufacturer | Laps | Time/Retired | Grid | Points |
|---|---|---|---|---|---|---|---|---|
| 1 | 46 | (Italy) Valentino Rossi | Gauloises Yamaha Team | Yamaha | 22 | 43:56.539 | 4 | 25 |
| 2 | 65 | (Italy) Loris Capirossi | Ducati Marlboro Team | Ducati | 22 | +1.837 | 3 | 20 |
| 3 | 3 | (Italy) Max Biaggi | Repsol Honda Team | Honda | 22 | +3.444 | 10 | 16 |
| 4 | 4 | (Brazil) Alex Barros | Camel Honda | Honda | 22 | +4.148 | 7 | 13 |
| 5 | 69 | (United States) Nicky Hayden | Repsol Honda Team | Honda | 22 | +4.363 | 2 | 11 |
| 6 | 33 | (Italy) Marco Melandri | Movistar Honda MotoGP | Honda | 22 | +11.150 | 5 | 10 |
| 7 | 5 | (United States) Colin Edwards | Gauloises Yamaha Team | Yamaha | 22 | +13.532 | 9 | 9 |
| 8 | 7 | (Spain) Carlos Checa | Ducati Marlboro Team | Ducati | 22 | +19.331 | 6 | 8 |
| 9 | 12 | (Australia) Troy Bayliss | Camel Honda | Honda | 22 | +27.125 | 13 | 7 |
| 10 | 6 | (Japan) Makoto Tamada | Konica Minolta Honda | Honda | 22 | +27.248 | 12 | 6 |
| 11 | 10 | (United States) Kenny Roberts Jr. | Team Suzuki MotoGP | Suzuki | 22 | +27.684 | 17 | 5 |
| 12 | 56 | (Japan) Shinya Nakano | Kawasaki Racing Team | Kawasaki | 22 | +27.803 | 11 | 4 |
| 13 | 21 | (United States) John Hopkins | Team Suzuki MotoGP | Suzuki | 22 | +28.278 | 8 | 3 |
| 14 | 24 | (Spain) Toni Elías | Fortuna Yamaha Team | Yamaha | 22 | +28.571 | 15 | 2 |
| 15 | 66 | (Germany) Alex Hofmann | Kawasaki Racing Team | Kawasaki | 22 | +29.768 | 14 | 1 |
| 16 | 9 | (Japan) Nobuatsu Aoki | Team Suzuki MotoGP | Suzuki | 22 | +41.778 | 16 | |
| 17 | 44 | (Italy) Roberto Rolfo | Team d'Antin Pramac | Ducati | 22 | +57.800 | 19 | |
| 18 | 11 | (Spain) Rubén Xaus | Fortuna Yamaha Team | Yamaha | 22 | +1:08.082 | 20 | |
| 19 | 77 | (United Kingdom) James Ellison | Blata WCM | Blata | 22 | +1:42.169 | 18 | |
| 20 | 27 | (Italy) Franco Battaini | Blata WCM | Blata | 22 | +1:54.784 | 21 | |
| Ret | 15 | (Spain) Sete Gibernau | Movistar Honda MotoGP | Honda | 21 | Retirement | 1 | |
| Ret | 99 | (United Kingdom) Jeremy McWilliams | Team Roberts | Proton KR | 7 | Retirement | 22 | |

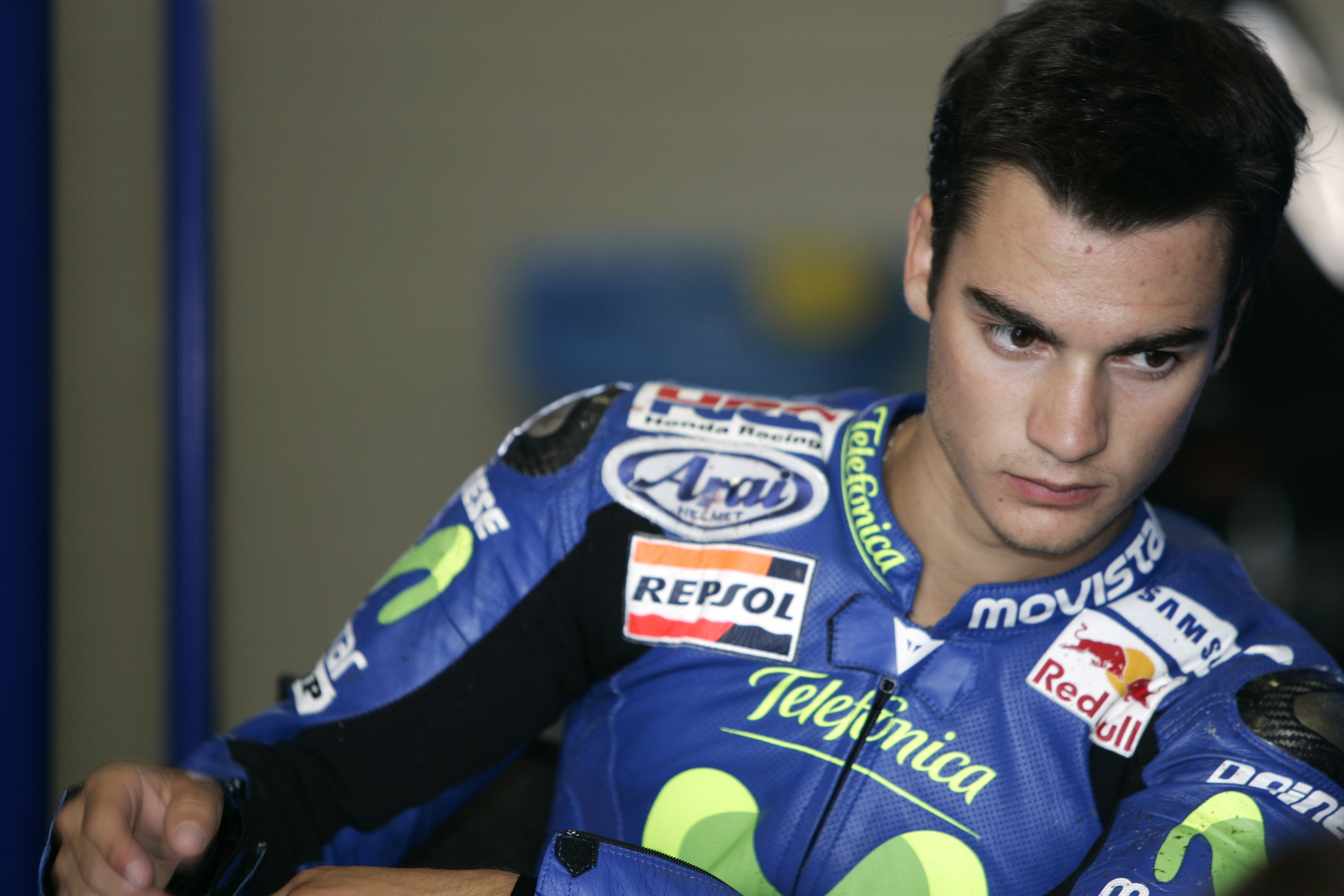
Dani Pedrosa in his pit box before the 250cc race, which he went on to win.

== 250 cc classification ==
| Pos. | No. | Rider | Manufacturer | Laps | Time/Retired | Grid | Points |
|---|---|---|---|---|---|---|---|
| 1 | 1 | (Spain) Daniel Pedrosa | Honda | 20 | 41:24.944 | 2 | 25 |
| 2 | 48 | (Spain) Jorge Lorenzo | Honda | 20 | +1.303 | 1 | 20 |
| 3 | 27 | (Australia) Casey Stoner | Aprilia | 20 | +4.253 | 3 | 16 |
| 4 | 5 | (San Marino) Alex de Angelis | Aprilia | 20 | +5.326 | 7 | 13 |
| 5 | 73 | (Japan) Hiroshi Aoyama | Honda | 20 | +8.392 | 8 | 11 |
| 6 | 34 | (Italy) Andrea Dovizioso | Honda | 20 | +8.471 | 4 | 10 |
| 7 | 19 | (Argentina) Sebastián Porto | Aprilia | 20 | +25.545 | 6 | 9 |
| 8 | 7 | (France) Randy de Puniet | Aprilia | 20 | +32.159 | 5 | 8 |
| 9 | 15 | (Italy) Roberto Locatelli | Aprilia | 20 | +33.969 | 11 | 7 |
| 10 | 50 | (France) Sylvain Guintoli | Aprilia | 20 | +35.544 | 10 | 6 |
| 11 | 96 | (Czech Republic) Jakub Smrž | Honda | 20 | +51.827 | 14 | 5 |
| 12 | 14 | (Australia) Anthony West | KTM | 20 | +52.049 | 23 | 4 |
| 13 | 6 | (Spain) Alex Debón | Honda | 20 | +58.214 | 19 | 3 |
| 14 | 64 | (Czech Republic) Radomil Rous | Honda | 20 | +58.604 | 18 | 2 |
| 15 | 17 | (Germany) Steve Jenkner | Aprilia | 20 | +58.911 | 22 | 1 |
| 16 | 8 | (Italy) Andrea Ballerini | Aprilia | 20 | +1:06.203 | 16 | |
| 17 | 32 | (Italy) Mirko Giansanti | Aprilia | 20 | +1:14.453 | 21 | |
| 18 | 21 | (France) Arnaud Vincent | Fantic | 20 | +1:27.753 | 25 | |
| 19 | 36 | (Colombia) Martín Cárdenas | Aprilia | 20 | +1:28.522 | 27 | |
| 20 | 41 | (Spain) Álvaro Molina | Aprilia | 20 | +1:48.266 | 29 | |
| 21 | 38 | (France) Grégory Leblanc | Aprilia | 20 | +1:49.455 | 26 | |
| 22 | 70 | (Czech Republic) Michal Filla | Aprilia | 19 | +1 lap | 28 | |
| 23 | 25 | (Italy) Alex Baldolini | Aprilia | 19 | +1 lap | 17 | |
| 24 | 23 | (Sweden) Nicklas Cajback | Yamaha | 19 | +1 lap | 30 | |
| Ret | 28 | (Germany) Dirk Heidolf | Honda | 19 | Accident | 20 | |
| Ret | 44 | (Japan) Taro Sekiguchi | Aprilia | 19 | Accident | 24 | |
| Ret | 57 | (United Kingdom) Chaz Davies | Aprilia | 4 | Accident | 15 | |
| Ret | 24 | (Italy) Simone Corsi | Aprilia | 0 | Accident | 13 | |
| Ret | 55 | (Japan) Yuki Takahashi | Honda | 0 | Accident | 9 | |
| Ret | 80 | (Spain) Héctor Barberá | Honda | 0 | Accident | 12 | |
| DNQ | 20 | (Italy) Gabriele Ferro | Fantic | | Did not qualify | | |
| DNQ | 22 | (Bulgaria) Alexander Todorov | Yamaha | | Did not qualify | | |

== 125 cc classification ==
| Pos. | No. | Rider | Manufacturer | Laps | Time/Retired | Grid | Points |
|---|---|---|---|---|---|---|---|
| 1 | 12 | (Switzerland) Thomas Lüthi | Honda | 19 | 41:32.409 | 1 | 25 |
| 2 | 36 | (Finland) Mika Kallio | KTM | 19 | +3.212 | 3 | 20 |
| 3 | 58 | (Italy) Marco Simoncelli | Aprilia | 19 | +3.326 | 4 | 16 |
| 4 | 33 | (Spain) Sergio Gadea | Aprilia | 19 | +7.754 | 20 | 13 |
| 5 | 8 | (Italy) Lorenzo Zanetti | Aprilia | 19 | +14.453 | 15 | 11 |
| 6 | 32 | (Italy) Fabrizio Lai | Honda | 19 | +25.156 | 7 | 10 |
| 7 | 63 | (France) Mike Di Meglio | Honda | 19 | +25.247 | 17 | 9 |
| 8 | 54 | (San Marino) Manuel Poggiali | Gilera | 19 | +25.509 | 14 | 8 |
| 9 | 14 | (Hungary) Gábor Talmácsi | KTM | 19 | +25.773 | 5 | 7 |
| 10 | 60 | (Spain) Julián Simón | KTM | 19 | +26.066 | 13 | 6 |
| 11 | 29 | (Italy) Andrea Iannone | Aprilia | 19 | +28.977 | 18 | 5 |
| 12 | 19 | (Spain) Álvaro Bautista | Honda | 19 | +30.360 | 21 | 4 |
| 13 | 41 | (Spain) Aleix Espargaró | Honda | 19 | +30.375 | 23 | 3 |
| 14 | 11 | (Germany) Sandro Cortese | Honda | 19 | +30.759 | 6 | 2 |
| 15 | 77 | (Germany) Stefan Bradl | KTM | 19 | +33.726 | 26 | 1 |
| 16 | 22 | (Spain) Pablo Nieto | Derbi | 19 | +36.880 | 19 | |
| 17 | 35 | (Italy) Raffaele De Rosa | Aprilia | 19 | +38.339 | 10 | |
| 18 | 45 | (Hungary) Imre Tóth | Aprilia | 19 | +38.415 | 25 | |
| 19 | 18 | (Spain) Nicolás Terol | Derbi | 19 | +41.510 | 30 | |
| 20 | 43 | (Spain) Manuel Hernández | Aprilia | 19 | +44.672 | 22 | |
| 21 | 26 | (Switzerland) Vincent Braillard | Aprilia | 19 | +47.255 | 32 | |
| 22 | 6 | (Spain) Joan Olivé | Aprilia | 19 | +1:02.693 | 31 | |
| 23 | 31 | (Germany) Sascha Hommel | Malaguti | 19 | +1:32.186 | 36 | |
| 24 | 99 | (Germany) Thomas Mayer | Aprilia | 19 | +1:32.368 | 37 | |
| 25 | 84 | (Spain) Julián Miralles | Aprilia | 19 | +2:09.147 | 39 | |
| 26 | 48 | (Spain) David Bonache | Honda | 19 | +2:17.127 | 38 | |
| Ret | 75 | (Italy) Mattia Pasini | Aprilia | 17 | Accident | 2 | |
| Ret | 55 | (Spain) Héctor Faubel | Aprilia | 17 | Accident | 16 | |
| Ret | 87 | (Czech Republic) Patrik Vostárek | Honda | 17 | Accident | 33 | |
| Ret | 28 | (Spain) Jordi Carchano | Aprilia | 17 | Retirement | 35 | |
| Ret | 97 | (Czech Republic) Lukáš Rážek | Honda | 17 | Accident | 40 | |
| Ret | 10 | (Italy) Federico Sandi | Honda | 13 | Retirement | 34 | |
| Ret | 25 | (Germany) Dario Giuseppetti | Aprilia | 11 | Retirement | 28 | |
| Ret | 44 | (Czech Republic) Karel Abraham | Aprilia | 10 | Accident | 24 | |
| Ret | 52 | (Czech Republic) Lukáš Pešek | Derbi | 9 | Accident | 8 | |
| Ret | 71 | (Japan) Tomoyoshi Koyama | Honda | 5 | Accident | 9 | |
| Ret | 7 | (France) Alexis Masbou | Honda | 5 | Accident | 11 | |
| Ret | 76 | (Austria) Michael Ranseder | KTM | 5 | Accident | 12 | |
| Ret | 16 | (Netherlands) Raymond Schouten | Honda | 5 | Retirement | 27 | |
| Ret | 15 | (Italy) Michele Pirro | Malaguti | 5 | Retirement | 29 | |
| DNS | 9 | (Japan) Toshihisa Kuzuhara | Honda | | Did not start | | |

== Championship standings after the race (MotoGP) ==
Below are the standings for the top five riders and constructors after round eleven has concluded.

Riders' Championship standings

| Pos. | Rider | Points |
|---|---|---|
| 1 | (Italy) Valentino Rossi | 261 |
| 2 | (Italy) Max Biaggi | 129 |
| 3 | (Italy) Marco Melandri | 126 |
| 4 | (United States) Colin Edwards | 123 |
| 5 | (Spain) Sete Gibernau | 115 |

Constructors' Championship standings

| Pos. | Constructor | Points |
|---|---|---|
| 1 | (Japan) Yamaha | 265 |
| 2 | (Japan) Honda | 218 |
| 3 | (Italy) Ducati | 102 |
| 4 | (Japan) Kawasaki | 97 |
| 5 | (Japan) Suzuki | 65 |

- Note: Only the top five positions are included for both sets of standings.

| Previous race: 2005 German Grand Prix | FIM Grand Prix World Championship; 2005 season | Next race: 2005 Japanese Grand Prix |
| Previous race: 2004 Czech Republic Grand Prix | Czech Republic motorcycle Grand Prix | Next race: 2006 Czech Republic Grand Prix |
