= 2005 Qatar motorcycle Grand Prix =

2005 Qatar Grand Prix
Race details
- Race 14 of 17 races in the 2005 Grand Prix motorcycle racing season
- Date: 1 October 2005
- Official name: Marlboro Grand Prix of Qatar
- Location: Losail International Circuit
- Course: Permanent racing facility; 5.380 km (3.343 mi)

MotoGP
Pole position
- Rider: (Italy) Loris Capirossi
- Time: 1:56.917
Fastest lap
- Rider: (United States) Nicky Hayden
- Time: 1:57.903 on lap 9
Podium
- First: (Italy) Valentino Rossi
- Second: (Italy) Marco Melandri
- Third: (United States) Nicky Hayden

250cc
Pole position
- Rider: (Spain) Jorge Lorenzo
- Time: 2:02.154
Fastest lap
- Rider: (Spain) Daniel Pedrosa
- Time: 2:03.301 on lap 9
Podium
- First: (Australia) Casey Stoner
- Second: (Spain) Jorge Lorenzo
- Third: (Italy) Andrea Dovizioso

125cc
Pole position
- Rider: (Finland) Mika Kallio
- Time: 2:09.455
Fastest lap
- Rider: (Italy) Marco Simoncelli
- Time: 2:10.515 on lap 11
Podium
- First: (Hungary) Gábor Talmácsi
- Second: (Finland) Mika Kallio
- Third: (Italy) Marco Simoncelli

The 2005 Qatar motorcycle Grand Prix was the fourteenth round of the 2005 MotoGP Championship. It took place on the weekend of 29 September-1 October 2005 at the Losail International Circuit.

== MotoGP classification ==
Pos.	No.	Rider	Team	Manufacturer	Laps	Time/Retired	Grid	Points
1	46	(Italy) Valentino Rossi	Gauloises Yamaha Team	Yamaha	22	43:33.759	3	25
2	33	(Italy) Marco Melandri	Movistar Honda MotoGP	Honda	22	+1.670	5	20
3	69	(United States) Nicky Hayden	Repsol Honda Team	Honda	22	+5.536	8	16
4	5	(United States) Colin Edwards	Gauloises Yamaha Team	Yamaha	22	+14.737	4	13
5	15	(Spain) Sete Gibernau	Movistar Honda MotoGP	Honda	22	+20.431	2	11
6	7	(Spain) Carlos Checa	Ducati Marlboro Team	Ducati	22	+31.432	6	10
7	56	(Japan) Shinya Nakano	Kawasaki Racing Team	Kawasaki	22	+32.983	7	9
8	24	(Spain) Toni Elías	Fortuna Yamaha Team	Yamaha	22	+39.888	9	8
9	4	(Brazil) Alex Barros	Camel Honda	Honda	22	+41.792	14	7
10	65	(Italy) Loris Capirossi	Ducati Marlboro Team	Ducati	22	+44.252	1	6
11	10	(United States) Kenny Roberts Jr.	Team Suzuki MotoGP	Suzuki	22	+48.745	11	5
12	44	(Italy) Roberto Rolfo	Team d'Antin Pramac	Ducati	22	+1:01.991	15	4
13	67	(United Kingdom) Shane Byrne	Camel Honda	Honda	22	+1:04.805	17	3
14	11	(Spain) Rubén Xaus	Fortuna Yamaha Team	Yamaha	22	+1:13.824	16	2
15	77	(United Kingdom) James Ellison	Blata WCM	Blata	22	+2:08.642	18	1
16	27	(Italy) Franco Battaini	Blata WCM	Blata	21	+1 lap	19	
17	21	(United States) John Hopkins	Team Suzuki MotoGP	Suzuki	21	+1 lap	12	
Ret	6	(Japan) Makoto Tamada	Konica Minolta Honda	Honda	17	Accident	10	
Ret	3	(Italy) Max Biaggi	Repsol Honda Team	Honda	6	Retirement	13	
WD	19	(France) Olivier Jacque	Kawasaki Racing Team	Kawasaki		Withdrew		

== 250 cc classification ==
Pos.	No.	Rider	Manufacturer	Laps	Time/Retired	Grid	Points
1	27	(Australia) Casey Stoner	Aprilia	20	41:22.628	3	25
2	48	(Spain) Jorge Lorenzo	Honda	20	+1.566	1	20
3	34	(Italy) Andrea Dovizioso	Honda	20	+2.603	6	16
4	1	(Spain) Daniel Pedrosa	Honda	20	+2.659	4	13
5	19	(Argentina) Sebastián Porto	Aprilia	20	+4.867	5	11
6	73	(Japan) Hiroshi Aoyama	Honda	20	+29.971	7	10
7	80	(Spain) Héctor Barberá	Honda	20	+32.708	9	9
8	55	(Japan) Yuki Takahashi	Honda	20	+46.470	10	8
9	50	(France) Sylvain Guintoli	Aprilia	20	+46.849	11	7
10	44	(Japan) Taro Sekiguchi	Aprilia	20	+1:01.682	18	6
11	6	(Spain) Alex Debón	Honda	20	+1:01.696	17	5
12	32	(Italy) Mirko Giansanti	Aprilia	20	+1:01.780	15	4
13	36	(Colombia) Martín Cárdenas	Aprilia	20	+1:02.795	21	3
14	17	(Germany) Steve Jenkner	Aprilia	20	+1:03.952	16	2
15	8	(Italy) Andrea Ballerini	Aprilia	20	+1:04.917	14	1
16	57	(United Kingdom) Chaz Davies	Aprilia	20	+1:06.194	20	
17	24	(Italy) Simone Corsi	Aprilia	20	+1:21.004	19	
18	28	(Germany) Dirk Heidolf	Honda	20	+1:36.546	22	
19	56	(France) Mathieu Gines	Aprilia	20	+1:51.045	27	
20	25	(Italy) Alex Baldolini	Aprilia	20	+2:02.105	24	
Ret	63	(France) Erwan Nigon	Yamaha	17	Retirement	23	
Ret	96	(Czech Republic) Jakub Smrž	Honda	16	Retirement	13	
Ret	7	(France) Randy de Puniet	Aprilia	12	Retirement	8	
Ret	15	(Italy) Roberto Locatelli	Aprilia	6	Accident	12	
Ret	5	(San Marino) Alex de Angelis	Aprilia	5	Accident	2	
Ret	64	(Czech Republic) Radomil Rous	Honda	5	Accident	26	
Ret	21	(France) Arnaud Vincent	Fantic	2	Retirement	25	
DNS	14	(Australia) Anthony West	KTM		Did not start		
DNQ	20	(Italy) Gabriele Ferro	Fantic		Did not qualify		
DNQ	23	(Sweden) Nicklas Cajback	Yamaha		Did not qualify		

== 125 cc classification ==
Pos.	No.	Rider	Manufacturer	Laps	Time/Retired	Grid	Points
1	14	(Hungary) Gábor Talmácsi	KTM	18	39:23.248	2	25
2	36	(Finland) Mika Kallio	KTM	18	+0.017	1	20
3	58	(Italy) Marco Simoncelli	Aprilia	18	+9.571	7	16
4	63	(France) Mike Di Meglio	Honda	18	+11.815	10	13
5	55	(Spain) Héctor Faubel	Aprilia	18	+12.169	11	11
6	12	(Switzerland) Thomas Lüthi	Honda	18	+12.303	9	10
7	54	(San Marino) Manuel Poggiali	Gilera	18	+12.317	6	9
8	60	(Spain) Julián Simón	KTM	18	+12.565	4	8
9	75	(Italy) Mattia Pasini	Aprilia	18	+17.571	3	7
10	32	(Italy) Fabrizio Lai	Honda	18	+19.757	5	6
11	6	(Spain) Joan Olivé	Aprilia	18	+22.037	13	5
12	33	(Spain) Sergio Gadea	Aprilia	18	+24.205	18	4
13	35	(Italy) Raffaele De Rosa	Aprilia	18	+25.342	14	3
14	71	(Japan) Tomoyoshi Koyama	Honda	18	+27.965	16	2
15	51	(Spain) Enrique Jerez	Derbi	18	+37.241	24	1
16	8	(Italy) Lorenzo Zanetti	Aprilia	18	+43.704	22	
17	11	(Germany) Sandro Cortese	Honda	18	+44.855	21	
18	41	(Spain) Aleix Espargaró	Honda	18	+44.870	17	
19	29	(Italy) Andrea Iannone	Aprilia	18	+45.521	20	
20	7	(France) Alexis Masbou	Honda	18	+49.011	15	
21	25	(Germany) Dario Giuseppetti	Aprilia	18	+50.024	27	
22	19	(Spain) Álvaro Bautista	Honda	18	+50.059	12	
23	42	(Italy) Gioele Pellino	Malaguti	18	+50.299	25	
24	46	(Spain) Mateo Túnez	Aprilia	18	+56.956	28	
25	28	(Spain) Jordi Carchano	Aprilia	18	+57.020	29	
26	10	(Italy) Federico Sandi	Honda	18	+1:14.927	31	
27	9	(Japan) Toshihisa Kuzuhara	Honda	18	+1:29.137	34	
28	44	(Czech Republic) Karel Abraham	Aprilia	18	+1:29.158	32	
29	45	(Hungary) Imre Tóth	Aprilia	18	+1:39.784	35	
Ret	15	(Italy) Michele Pirro	Malaguti	15	Retirement	30	
Ret	47	(Spain) Ángel Rodríguez	Aprilia	13	Accident	8	
Ret	22	(Spain) Pablo Nieto	Derbi	6	Retirement	19	
Ret	52	(Czech Republic) Lukáš Pešek	Derbi	3	Retirement	23	
Ret	43	(Spain) Manuel Hernández	Aprilia	3	Retirement	26	
Ret	31	(Germany) Sascha Hommel	Honda	2	Retirement	36	
Ret	48	(Spain) David Bonache	Honda	1	Accident	33	

== Championship standings after the race (MotoGP) ==
Below are the standings for the top five riders and constructors after round fourteen has concluded.

Riders' Championship standings

Pos.	Rider	Points
1	(Italy) Valentino Rossi	306
2	(Italy) Max Biaggi	159
3	(Italy) Marco Melandri	157
4	(United States) Colin Edwards	152
5	(United States) Nicky Hayden	150

Constructors' Championship standings

Pos.	Constructor	Points
1	(Japan) Yamaha	320
2	(Japan) Honda	271
3	(Italy) Ducati	162
4	(Japan) Kawasaki	106
5	(Japan) Suzuki	90

- Note: Only the top five positions are included for both sets of standings.

Previous race: 2005 Malaysian Grand Prix	FIM Grand Prix World Championship; 2005 season	Next race: 2005 Australian Grand Prix
Previous race: 2004 Qatar Grand Prix	Qatar motorcycle Grand Prix	Next race: 2006 Qatar Grand Prix
