= 2005 Japanese motorcycle Grand Prix =

(Japan) 2005 Japanese Grand Prix
Race details
- Race 12 of 17 races in the 2005 Grand Prix motorcycle racing season
- Date: 18 September 2005
- Official name: Grand Prix of Japan
- Location: Twin Ring Motegi
- Course: Permanent racing facility; 4.801 km (2.983 mi)

MotoGP
Pole position
- Rider: (Italy) Loris Capirossi
- Time: 1:46.363
Fastest lap
- Rider: (Italy) Loris Capirossi
- Time: 1:47.968 on lap 3
Podium
- First: (Italy) Loris Capirossi
- Second: (Italy) Max Biaggi
- Third: (Japan) Makoto Tamada

250cc
Pole position
- Rider: (Japan) Hiroshi Aoyama
- Time: 1:51.843
Fastest lap
- Rider: (Spain) Daniel Pedrosa
- Time: 1:53.199 on lap 14
Podium
- First: (Japan) Hiroshi Aoyama
- Second: (Spain) Daniel Pedrosa
- Third: (Australia) Casey Stoner

125cc
Pole position
- Rider: (Hungary) Gábor Talmácsi
- Time: 1:58.653
Fastest lap
- Rider: (Spain) Mateo Túnez
- Time: 1:59.018 on lap 7
Podium
- First: (Finland) Mika Kallio
- Second: (Switzerland) Thomas Lüthi
- Third: (Spain) Héctor Faubel

The 2005 Japanese motorcycle Grand Prix was the twelfth round of the 2005 MotoGP Championship. It took place on the weekend of 16–18 September 2005 at the Twin Ring Motegi circuit. In the 250cc class Jorge Lorenzo was handed a 1 race ban for riding in a irresponsible manner.

== MotoGP classification ==
Pos.	No.	Rider	Team	Manufacturer	Laps	Time/Retired	Grid	Points
1	65	(Italy) Loris Capirossi	Ducati Marlboro Team	Ducati	24	43:30.499	1	25
2	3	(Italy) Max Biaggi	Repsol Honda Team	Honda	24	+1.479	5	20
3	6	(Japan) Makoto Tamada	Konica Minolta Honda	Honda	24	+16.227	4	16
4	7	(Spain) Carlos Checa	Ducati Marlboro Team	Ducati	24	+22.148	9	13
5	21	(United States) John Hopkins	Team Suzuki MotoGP	Suzuki	24	+33.212	2	11
6	5	(United States) Colin Edwards	Gauloises Yamaha Team	Yamaha	24	+34.915	13	10
7	69	(United States) Nicky Hayden	Repsol Honda Team	Honda	24	+45.894	6	9
8	10	(United States) Kenny Roberts Jr.	Team Suzuki MotoGP	Suzuki	24	+56.498	8	8
9	24	(Spain) Toni Elías	Fortuna Yamaha Team	Yamaha	24	+1:12.037	17	7
10	11	(Spain) Rubén Xaus	Fortuna Yamaha Team	Yamaha	24	+1:34.927	19	6
11	27	(Italy) Franco Battaini	Blata WCM	Blata	23	+1 lap	20	5
Ret	33	(Italy) Marco Melandri	Movistar Honda MotoGP	Honda	12	Accident	3	
Ret	46	(Italy) Valentino Rossi	Gauloises Yamaha Team	Yamaha	12	Accident	11	
Ret	4	(Brazil) Alex Barros	Camel Honda	Honda	12	Accident	10	
Ret	15	(Spain) Sete Gibernau	Movistar Honda MotoGP	Honda	11	Accident	7	
Ret	56	(Japan) Shinya Nakano	Kawasaki Racing Team	Kawasaki	8	Retirement	14	
Ret	72	(Japan) Tohru Ukawa	Camel Honda	Honda	4	Retirement	15	
Ret	44	(Italy) Roberto Rolfo	Team d'Antin Pramac	Ducati	2	Accident	16	
Ret	66	(Germany) Alex Hofmann	Kawasaki Racing Team	Kawasaki	2	Accident	12	
Ret	45	(Japan) Naoki Matsudo	Moriwaki Racing	Moriwaki	0	Retirement	18	
DNS	77	(United Kingdom) James Ellison	Blata WCM	Blata		Did not start		

== 250 cc classification ==
Pos.	No.	Rider	Manufacturer	Laps	Time/Retired	Grid	Points
1	73	(Japan) Hiroshi Aoyama	Honda	23	43:52.454	1	25
2	1	(Spain) Daniel Pedrosa	Honda	23	+5.313	7	20
3	27	(Australia) Casey Stoner	Aprilia	23	+7.781	9	16
4	55	(Japan) Yuki Takahashi	Honda	23	+10.222	6	13
5	7	(France) Randy de Puniet	Aprilia	23	+10.763	8	11
6	34	(Italy) Andrea Dovizioso	Honda	23	+11.054	5	10
7	5	(San Marino) Alex de Angelis	Aprilia	23	+19.199	4	9
8	80	(Spain) Héctor Barberá	Honda	23	+24.665	13	8
9	6	(Spain) Alex Debón	Honda	23	+37.683	16	7
10	50	(France) Sylvain Guintoli	Aprilia	23	+38.122	11	6
11	24	(Italy) Simone Corsi	Aprilia	23	+38.194	24	5
12	17	(Germany) Steve Jenkner	Aprilia	23	+53.211	15	4
13	32	(Italy) Mirko Giansanti	Aprilia	23	+56.364	21	3
14	25	(Italy) Alex Baldolini	Aprilia	23	+1:08.640	27	2
15	64	(Czech Republic) Radomil Rous	Honda	23	+1:09.205	22	1
16	93	(Japan) Kouki Takahashi	Honda	23	+1:17.982	28	
17	36	(Colombia) Martín Cárdenas	Aprilia	23	+1:25.096	29	
18	28	(Germany) Dirk Heidolf	Honda	23	+1:26.088	20	
19	77	(Japan) Mamoru Akiya	Yamaha	23	+1:33.286	30	
20	79	(Japan) Masaki Tokudome	Yamaha	23	+1:35.598	25	
21	56	(France) Mathieu Gines	Aprilia	23	+1:37.552	32	
Ret	48	(Spain) Jorge Lorenzo	Honda	22	Accident	2	
Ret	44	(Japan) Taro Sekiguchi	Aprilia	21	Retirement	12	
Ret	19	(Argentina) Sebastián Porto	Aprilia	10	Accident	10	
Ret	8	(Italy) Andrea Ballerini	Aprilia	10	Retirement	26	
Ret	57	(United Kingdom) Chaz Davies	Aprilia	5	Accident	23	
Ret	75	(Japan) Shuhei Aoyama	Honda	2	Accident	3	
Ret	14	(Australia) Anthony West	KTM	2	Accident	14	
Ret	15	(Italy) Roberto Locatelli	Aprilia	0	Accident	17	
Ret	21	(France) Arnaud Vincent	Fantic	0	Accident	31	
Ret	78	(Japan) Ryuji Yokoe	Yamaha	0	Accident	18	
Ret	96	(Czech Republic) Jakub Smrž	Honda	0	Accident	19	
DNQ	23	(Sweden) Nicklas Cajback	Yamaha		Did not qualify		
DNQ	20	(Italy) Gabriele Ferro	Fantic		Did not qualify		
DNQ	22	(Bulgaria) Alexander Todorov	Yamaha		Did not qualify		

== 125 cc classification ==
The race, scheduled to be run for 21 laps, was stopped after 15 full laps due to an accident and did not restart as two thirds of the race distance had been completed.

Pos.	No.	Rider	Manufacturer	Laps	Time/Retired	Grid	Points
1	36	(Finland) Mika Kallio	KTM	15	30:10.854	5	25
2	12	(Switzerland) Thomas Lüthi	Honda	15	+0.111	7	20
3	55	(Spain) Héctor Faubel	Aprilia	15	+1.517	6	16
4	71	(Japan) Tomoyoshi Koyama	Honda	15	+2.349	2	13
5	75	(Italy) Mattia Pasini	Aprilia	15	+2.406	3	11
6	54	(San Marino) Manuel Poggiali	Gilera	15	+2.619	8	10
7	33	(Spain) Sergio Gadea	Aprilia	15	+2.761	10	9
8	22	(Spain) Pablo Nieto	Derbi	15	+2.961	13	8
9	19	(Spain) Álvaro Bautista	Honda	15	+3.720	9	7
10	32	(Italy) Fabrizio Lai	Honda	15	+9.936	14	6
11	63	(France) Mike Di Meglio	Honda	15	+14.546	12	5
12	41	(Spain) Aleix Espargaró	Honda	15	+14.693	24	4
13	29	(Italy) Andrea Iannone	Aprilia	15	+15.699	19	3
14	9	(Japan) Toshihisa Kuzuhara	Honda	15	+20.833	20	2
15	51	(Spain) Enrique Jerez	Derbi	15	+22.562	17	1
16	35	(Italy) Raffaele De Rosa	Aprilia	15	+24.038	22	
17	8	(Italy) Lorenzo Zanetti	Aprilia	15	+25.907	18	
18	6	(Spain) Joan Olivé	Aprilia	15	+27.014	27	
19	43	(Spain) Manuel Hernández	Aprilia	15	+27.502	26	
20	7	(France) Alexis Masbou	Honda	15	+27.548	21	
21	45	(Hungary) Imre Tóth	Aprilia	15	+47.987	25	
22	68	(Japan) Hiroaki Kuzuhara	Honda	15	+48.337	31	
23	10	(Italy) Federico Sandi	Honda	15	+48.524	34	
24	64	(Japan) Yuki Hamamoto	Honda	15	+51.086	32	
25	20	(Japan) Takumi Takahashi	Honda	15	+53.530	29	
26	66	(Japan) Arata Mori	Honda	15	+53.610	33	
27	26	(Switzerland) Vincent Braillard	Aprilia	15	+54.652	38	
28	44	(Czech Republic) Karel Abraham	Aprilia	15	+55.454	30	
29	67	(Japan) Kazuki Hanafusa	Honda	15	+1:03.564	41	
30	28	(Spain) Jordi Carchano	Aprilia	13	+2 laps	36	
Ret	14	(Hungary) Gábor Talmácsi	KTM	13	Accident	1	
Ret	52	(Czech Republic) Lukáš Pešek	Derbi	13	Retirement	23	
Ret	25	(Germany) Dario Giuseppetti	Aprilia	12	Retirement	28	
Ret	58	(Italy) Marco Simoncelli	Aprilia	9	Accident	4	
Ret	31	(Germany) Sascha Hommel	Malaguti	9	Accident	40	
Ret	46	(Spain) Mateo Túnez	Aprilia	7	Accident	15	
Ret	65	(Japan) Hiroomi Iwata	Honda	6	Retirement	35	
Ret	15	(Italy) Michele Pirro	Malaguti	5	Accident	37	
Ret	11	(Germany) Sandro Cortese	Honda	3	Accident	16	
Ret	48	(Spain) David Bonache	Honda	0	Retirement	39	
Ret	60	(Spain) Julián Simón	KTM	0	Accident	11	

== Championship standings after the race (MotoGP) ==
Below are the standings for the top five riders and constructors after round twelve has concluded.

Riders' Championship standings

Pos.	Rider	Points
1	(Italy) Valentino Rossi	261
2	(Italy) Max Biaggi	149
3	(United States) Colin Edwards	133
4	(Italy) Marco Melandri	126
5	(United States) Nicky Hayden	121

Constructors' Championship standings

Pos.	Constructor	Points
1	(Japan) Yamaha	275
2	(Japan) Honda	238
3	(Italy) Ducati	127
4	(Japan) Kawasaki	97
5	(Japan) Suzuki	76

- Note: Only the top five positions are included for both sets of standings.

Previous race: 2005 Czech Republic Grand Prix	FIM Grand Prix World Championship; 2005 season	Next race: 2005 Malaysian Grand Prix
Previous race: 2004 Japanese Grand Prix	Japanese motorcycle Grand Prix	Next race: 2006 Japanese Grand Prix
