= 2005 Australian motorcycle Grand Prix =

(Australia) 2005 Australian Grand Prix
Race details
- Race 15 of 17 races in the 2005 Grand Prix motorcycle racing season
- Date: 14–16 October 2005
- Official name: Polini Australian Grand Prix
- Location: Phillip Island Grand Prix Circuit
- Course: Permanent racing facility; 4.448 km (2.764 mi)

MotoGP
Pole position
- Rider: (United States) Nicky Hayden
- Time: 1:29.337
Fastest lap
- Rider: (Italy) Marco Melandri
- Time: 1:30.332 on lap 4
Podium
- First: (Italy) Valentino Rossi
- Second: (United States) Nicky Hayden
- Third: (Spain) Carlos Checa

250cc
Pole position
- Rider: (Australia) Casey Stoner
- Time: 1:32.756
Fastest lap
- Rider: (Argentina) Sebastián Porto
- Time: 1:33.503 on lap 3
Podium
- First: (Spain) Daniel Pedrosa
- Second: (Argentina) Sebastián Porto
- Third: (Spain) Jorge Lorenzo

125cc
Pole position
- Rider: (Switzerland) Thomas Lüthi
- Time: 1:37.543
Fastest lap
- Rider: (Spain) Ángel Rodríguez
- Time: 1:38.054 on lap 3
Podium
- First: (Switzerland) Thomas Lüthi
- Second: (Japan) Tomoyoshi Koyama
- Third: (Italy) Marco Simoncelli

The 2005 Australian motorcycle Grand Prix was the fifteenth round of the 2005 MotoGP Championship. It took place on the weekend of 13–15 October 2005 at the Phillip Island Grand Prix Circuit. It was also the final victory for Valentino Rossi at Phillip Island until the 2014 event.

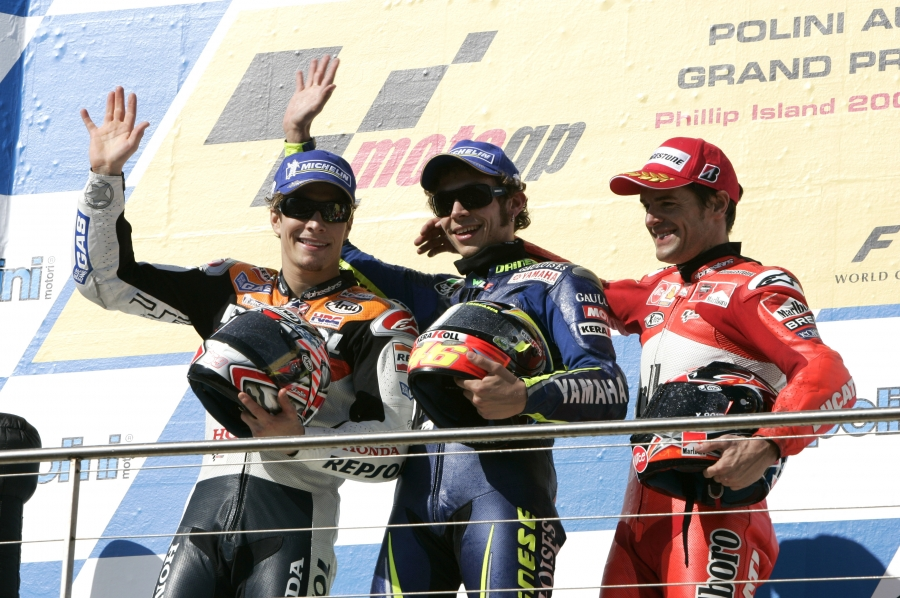
Nicky Hayden, Valentino Rossi and Carlos Checa on the podium after finishing second, first and third in the MotoGP race.

== MotoGP classification ==
Pos.	No.	Rider	Team	Manufacturer	Laps	Time/Retired	Grid	Points
1	46	(Italy) Valentino Rossi	Gauloises Yamaha Team	Yamaha	27	41:08.542	2	25
2	69	(United States) Nicky Hayden	Repsol Honda Team	Honda	27	+1.007	1	20
3	7	(Spain) Carlos Checa	Ducati Marlboro Team	Ducati	27	+4.215	4	16
4	33	(Italy) Marco Melandri	Movistar Honda MotoGP	Honda	27	+4.232	8	13
5	15	(Spain) Sete Gibernau	Movistar Honda MotoGP	Honda	27	+14.088	3	11
6	5	(United States) Colin Edwards	Gauloises Yamaha Team	Yamaha	27	+33.200	5	10
7	56	(Japan) Shinya Nakano	Kawasaki Racing Team	Kawasaki	27	+45.055	10	9
8	6	(Japan) Makoto Tamada	Konica Minolta Honda	Honda	27	+45.103	9	8
9	24	(Spain) Toni Elías	Fortuna Yamaha Team	Yamaha	27	+45.104	7	7
10	21	(United States) John Hopkins	Team Suzuki MotoGP	Suzuki	27	+50.260	11	6
11	17	(Australia) Chris Vermeulen	Camel Honda	Honda	27	+50.697	14	5
12	11	(Spain) Rubén Xaus	Fortuna Yamaha Team	Yamaha	27	+1:08.324	15	4
13	44	(Italy) Roberto Rolfo	Team d'Antin Pramac	Ducati	27	+1:31.737	16	3
14	77	(United Kingdom) James Ellison	Blata WCM	Blata	26	+1 lap	17	2
15	27	(Italy) Franco Battaini	Blata WCM	Blata	26	+1 lap	18	1
16	19	(France) Olivier Jacque	Kawasaki Racing Team	Kawasaki	25	+2 laps	13	
Ret	4	(Brazil) Alex Barros	Camel Honda	Honda	22	Accident	12	
Ret	3	(Italy) Max Biaggi	Repsol Honda Team	Honda	0	Accident	6	
WD	10	(United States) Kenny Roberts Jr.	Team Suzuki MotoGP	Suzuki		Withdrew		
WD	65	(Italy) Loris Capirossi	Ducati Marlboro Team	Ducati		Withdrew		

== 250 cc classification ==
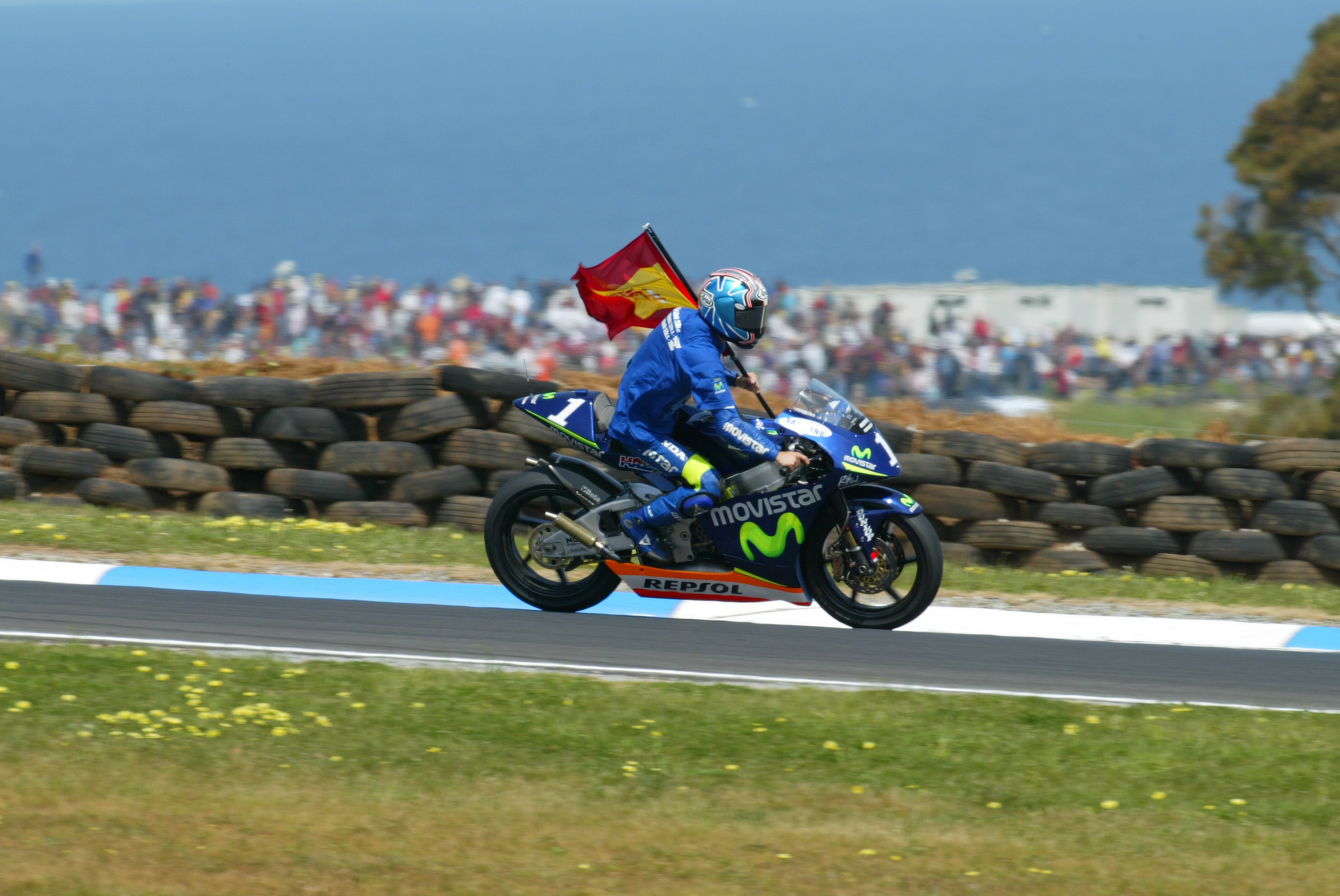
Daniel Pedrosa, celebrating after winning the 250cc race.

Pos.	No.	Rider	Manufacturer	Laps	Time/Retired	Grid	Points
1	1	(Spain) Daniel Pedrosa	Honda	25	39:18.195	6	25
2	19	(Argentina) Sebastián Porto	Aprilia	25	+0.027	4	20
3	48	(Spain) Jorge Lorenzo	Honda	25	+8.674	2	16
4	80	(Spain) Héctor Barberá	Honda	25	+24.838	5	13
5	34	(Italy) Andrea Dovizioso	Honda	25	+24.868	7	11
6	73	(Japan) Hiroshi Aoyama	Honda	25	+24.872	8	10
7	7	(France) Randy de Puniet	Aprilia	25	+37.274	9	9
8	15	(Italy) Roberto Locatelli	Aprilia	25	+47.013	10	8
9	6	(Spain) Alex Debón	Honda	25	+56.602	13	7
10	50	(France) Sylvain Guintoli	Aprilia	25	+56.747	14	6
11	57	(United Kingdom) Chaz Davies	Aprilia	25	+1:09.126	17	5
12	28	(Germany) Dirk Heidolf	Honda	25	+1:09.796	21	4
13	96	(Czech Republic) Jakub Smrž	Honda	25	+1:09.830	19	3
14	17	(Germany) Steve Jenkner	Aprilia	25	+1:14.472	12	2
15	8	(Italy) Andrea Ballerini	Aprilia	25	+1:14.497	20	1
16	24	(Italy) Simone Corsi	Aprilia	25	+1:14.771	16	
17	36	(Colombia) Martín Cárdenas	Aprilia	25	+1:22.080	23	
18	32	(Italy) Mirko Giansanti	Aprilia	24	+1 lap	22	
19	33	(Spain) Arturo Tizón	Honda	24	+1 lap	24	
20	56	(France) Mathieu Gines	Aprilia	24	+1 lap	27	
Ret	44	(Japan) Taro Sekiguchi	Aprilia	24	Retirement	15	
Ret	25	(Italy) Alex Baldolini	Aprilia	17	Accident	18	
Ret	21	(France) Arnaud Vincent	Fantic	12	Retirement	25	
Ret	55	(Japan) Yuki Takahashi	Honda	10	Retirement	11	
Ret	63	(France) Erwan Nigon	Yamaha	6	Retirement	26	
Ret	27	(Australia) Casey Stoner	Aprilia	4	Retirement	1	
Ret	5	(San Marino) Alex de Angelis	Aprilia	3	Accident	3	
DNQ	82	(Australia) Mick Kelly	Honda		Did not qualify		
DNQ	23	(Sweden) Nicklas Cajback	Yamaha		Did not qualify		
DNQ	81	(Australia) Mark Rowling	Yamaha		Did not qualify		
DNQ	20	(Italy) Gabriele Ferro	Fantic		Did not qualify		

== 125 cc classification ==
Pos.	No.	Rider	Manufacturer	Laps	Time/Retired	Grid	Points
1	12	(Switzerland) Thomas Lüthi	Honda	23	38:00.352	1	25
2	71	(Japan) Tomoyoshi Koyama	Honda	23	+2.663	6	20
3	58	(Italy) Marco Simoncelli	Aprilia	23	+2.665	4	16
4	75	(Italy) Mattia Pasini	Aprilia	23	+2.673	2	13
5	36	(Finland) Mika Kallio	KTM	23	+2.860	5	11
6	55	(Spain) Héctor Faubel	Aprilia	23	+2.945	13	10
7	14	(Hungary) Gábor Talmácsi	KTM	23	+2.950	3	9
8	47	(Spain) Ángel Rodríguez	Aprilia	23	+3.386	12	8
9	33	(Spain) Sergio Gadea	Aprilia	23	+10.546	22	7
10	7	(France) Alexis Masbou	Honda	23	+10.551	17	6
11	35	(Italy) Raffaele De Rosa	Aprilia	23	+10.851	14	5
12	32	(Italy) Fabrizio Lai	Honda	23	+11.071	9	4
13	54	(San Marino) Manuel Poggiali	Gilera	23	+11.133	15	3
14	63	(France) Mike Di Meglio	Honda	23	+11.629	7	2
15	6	(Spain) Joan Olivé	Aprilia	23	+15.048	10	1
16	19	(Spain) Álvaro Bautista	Honda	23	+30.883	18	
17	41	(Spain) Aleix Espargaró	Honda	23	+30.884	19	
18	22	(Spain) Pablo Nieto	Derbi	23	+49.058	25	
19	11	(Germany) Sandro Cortese	Honda	23	+49.131	16	
20	8	(Italy) Lorenzo Zanetti	Aprilia	23	+49.170	23	
21	9	(Japan) Toshihisa Kuzuhara	Honda	23	+50.660	26	
22	43	(Spain) Manuel Hernández	Aprilia	23	+51.027	27	
23	46	(Spain) Mateo Túnez	Aprilia	23	+1:07.317	30	
24	42	(Italy) Gioele Pellino	Malaguti	23	+1:09.832	28	
25	28	(Spain) Jordi Carchano	Aprilia	23	+1:21.312	24	
26	25	(Germany) Dario Giuseppetti	Aprilia	23	+1:28.227	34	
27	48	(Spain) David Bonache	Honda	22	+1 lap	32	
28	69	(Australia) Blake Leigh-Smith	Honda	21	+2 laps	35	
Ret	10	(Italy) Federico Sandi	Honda	18	Retirement	29	
Ret	81	(Australia) Tom Hatton	Honda	16	Accident	37	
Ret	18	(Spain) Nicolás Terol	Derbi	13	Retirement	20	
Ret	52	(Czech Republic) Lukáš Pešek	Derbi	8	Accident	8	
Ret	60	(Spain) Julián Simón	KTM	7	Accident	11	
Ret	45	(Hungary) Imre Tóth	Aprilia	6	Retirement	21	
Ret	29	(Italy) Andrea Iannone	Aprilia	3	Retirement	33	
Ret	15	(Italy) Michele Pirro	Malaguti	2	Retirement	31	
Ret	31	(Germany) Sascha Hommel	Honda	0	Retirement	36	
DNS	44	(Czech Republic) Karel Abraham	Aprilia		Did not start		
DNQ	70	(Australia) Brent Rigoli	Honda		Did not qualify		
DNQ	83	(Australia) Rhys Moller	Honda		Did not qualify		
DNQ	82	(Australia) Candice Scott	Honda		Did not qualify		

== Championship standings after the race (MotoGP) ==
Below are the standings for the top five riders and constructors after round fifteen has concluded.

Riders' Championship standings

Pos.	Rider	Points
1	(Italy) Valentino Rossi	331
2	(United States) Nicky Hayden	170
3	(Italy) Marco Melandri	170
4	(United States) Colin Edwards	162
5	(Italy) Max Biaggi	159

Constructors' Championship standings

Pos.	Constructor	Points
1	(Japan) Yamaha	345
2	(Japan) Honda	291
3	(Italy) Ducati	178
4	(Japan) Kawasaki	115
5	(Japan) Suzuki	96

- Note: Only the top five positions are included for both sets of standings.

Previous race: 2005 Qatar Grand Prix	FIM Grand Prix World Championship; 2005 season	Next race: 2005 Turkish Grand Prix
Previous race: 2004 Australian Grand Prix	Australian motorcycle Grand Prix	Next race: 2006 Australian Grand Prix
