= 2005 Malaysian motorcycle Grand Prix =

(Malaysia) 2005 Malaysian Grand Prix
Race details
- Race 13 of 17 races in the 2005 Grand Prix motorcycle racing season
- Date: 25 September 2005
- Official name: Marlboro Malaysian Motorcycle Grand Prix
- Location: Sepang International Circuit
- Course: Permanent racing facility; 5.543 km (3.444 mi)

MotoGP
Pole position
- Rider: (Italy) Loris Capirossi
- Time: 2:01.731
Fastest lap
- Rider: (United States) Nicky Hayden
- Time: 2:02.993 on lap 3
Podium
- First: (Italy) Loris Capirossi
- Second: (Italy) Valentino Rossi
- Third: (Spain) Carlos Checa

250cc
Pole position
- Rider: (Japan) Hiroshi Aoyama
- Time: 2:07.860
Fastest lap
- Rider: (Australia) Casey Stoner
- Time: 2:08.853 on lap 2
Podium
- First: (Australia) Casey Stoner
- Second: (San Marino) Alex de Angelis
- Third: (Argentina) Sebastián Porto

125cc
Pole position
- Rider: (Switzerland) Thomas Lüthi
- Time: 2:14.546
Fastest lap
- Rider: (Hungary) Gábor Talmácsi
- Time: 2:14.839 on lap 3
Podium
- First: (Switzerland) Thomas Lüthi
- Second: (Finland) Mika Kallio
- Third: (Italy) Mattia Pasini

The 2005 Malaysian motorcycle Grand Prix was the thirteenth round of the 2005 Grand Prix motorcycle racing season. It took place on the weekend of 23–25 September 2005 at the Sepang International Circuit.

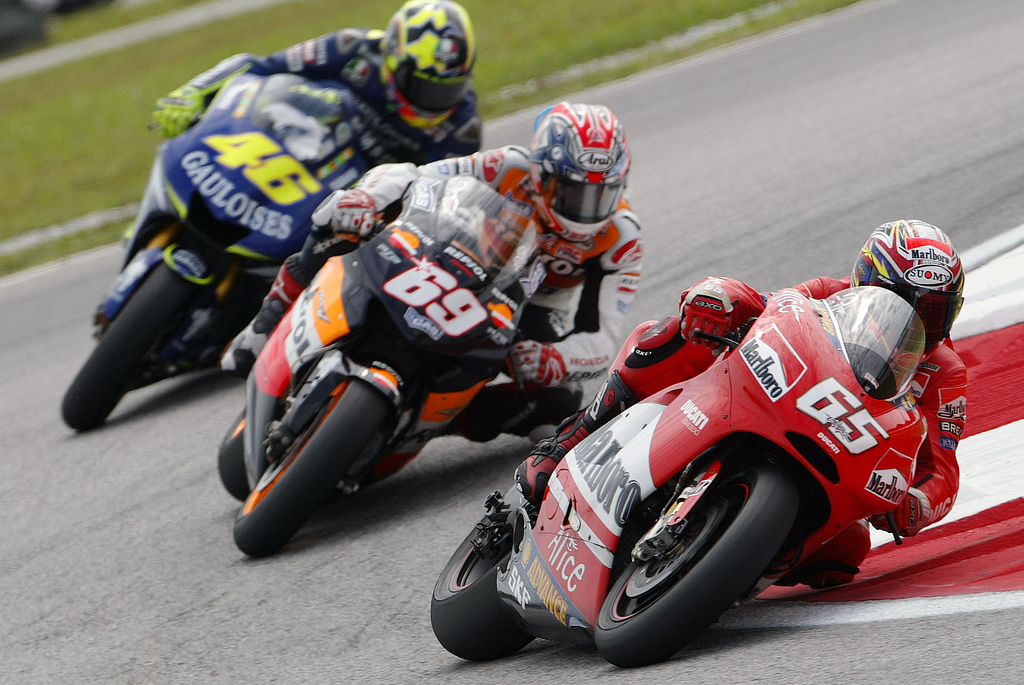
Loris Capirossi, Nicky Hayden and Valentino Rossi, battling for the lead at the MotoGP race. Capirossi went on to win, with Hayden and Rossi finishing fourth and second.

== MotoGP classification ==
Pos.	No.	Rider	Team	Manufacturer	Laps	Time/Retired	Grid	Points
1	65	(Italy) Loris Capirossi	Ducati Marlboro Team	Ducati	21	43:27.523	1	25
2	46	(Italy) Valentino Rossi	Gauloises Yamaha Team	Yamaha	21	+1.999	7	20
3	7	(Spain) Carlos Checa	Ducati Marlboro Team	Ducati	21	+2.069	8	16
4	69	(United States) Nicky Hayden	Repsol Honda Team	Honda	21	+9.227	6	13
5	33	(Italy) Marco Melandri	Movistar Honda MotoGP	Honda	21	+15.886	9	11
6	3	(Italy) Max Biaggi	Repsol Honda Team	Honda	21	+16.826	12	10
7	10	(United States) Kenny Roberts Jr.	Team Suzuki MotoGP	Suzuki	21	+17.249	5	9
8	4	(Brazil) Alex Barros	Camel Honda	Honda	21	+18.221	11	8
9	21	(United States) John Hopkins	Team Suzuki MotoGP	Suzuki	21	+20.125	3	7
10	5	(United States) Colin Edwards	Gauloises Yamaha Team	Yamaha	21	+22.275	10	6
11	24	(Spain) Toni Elías	Fortuna Yamaha Team	Yamaha	21	+29.856	14	5
12	6	(Japan) Makoto Tamada	Konica Minolta Honda	Honda	21	+51.672	15	4
13	44	(Italy) Roberto Rolfo	Team d'Antin Pramac	Ducati	21	+1:05.365	17	3
14	67	(United Kingdom) Shane Byrne	Camel Honda	Honda	21	+1:19.106	18	2
15	11	(Spain) Rubén Xaus	Fortuna Yamaha Team	Yamaha	21	+1:19.356	16	1
16	27	(Italy) Franco Battaini	Blata WCM	Blata	21	+1:55.882	19	
Ret	77	(United Kingdom) James Ellison	Blata WCM	Blata	17	Retirement	20	
Ret	19	(France) Olivier Jacque	Kawasaki Racing Team	Kawasaki	4	Retirement	13	
Ret	56	(Japan) Shinya Nakano	Kawasaki Racing Team	Kawasaki	1	Accident	4	
Ret	15	(Spain) Sete Gibernau	Movistar Honda MotoGP	Honda	1	Accident	2	

== 250 cc classification ==
Pos.	No.	Rider	Manufacturer	Laps	Time/Retired	Grid	Points
1	27	(Australia) Casey Stoner	Aprilia	20	43:23.138	4	25
2	5	(San Marino) Alex de Angelis	Aprilia	20	+3.133	3	20
3	19	(Argentina) Sebastián Porto	Aprilia	20	+4.111	5	16
4	7	(France) Randy de Puniet	Aprilia	20	+7.569	7	13
5	73	(Japan) Hiroshi Aoyama	Honda	20	+10.109	1	11
6	80	(Spain) Héctor Barberá	Honda	20	+26.123	8	10
7	55	(Japan) Yuki Takahashi	Honda	20	+27.301	18	9
8	15	(Italy) Roberto Locatelli	Aprilia	20	+28.006	14	8
9	50	(France) Sylvain Guintoli	Aprilia	20	+59.478	9	7
10	44	(Japan) Taro Sekiguchi	Aprilia	20	+59.579	23	6
11	28	(Germany) Dirk Heidolf	Honda	20	+1:01.437	15	5
12	57	(United Kingdom) Chaz Davies	Aprilia	20	+1:04.004	20	4
13	32	(Italy) Mirko Giansanti	Aprilia	20	+1:04.803	21	3
14	17	(Germany) Steve Jenkner	Aprilia	20	+1:12.500	22	2
15	36	(Colombia) Martín Cárdenas	Aprilia	20	+1:21.073	24	1
16	63	(France) Erwan Nigon	Yamaha	20	+1:31.925	25	
17	56	(France) Mathieu Gines	Aprilia	20	+1:51.975	26	
18	23	(Sweden) Nicklas Cajback	Yamaha	19	+1 lap	28	
19	96	(Czech Republic) Jakub Smrž	Honda	19	+1 lap	13	
Ret	24	(Italy) Simone Corsi	Aprilia	7	Accident	10	
Ret	25	(Italy) Alex Baldolini	Aprilia	7	Retirement	19	
Ret	14	(Australia) Anthony West	KTM	5	Retirement	17	
Ret	1	(Spain) Daniel Pedrosa	Honda	1	Accident	2	
Ret	8	(Italy) Andrea Ballerini	Aprilia	1	Accident	11	
Ret	21	(France) Arnaud Vincent	Fantic	1	Retirement	27	
Ret	34	(Italy) Andrea Dovizioso	Honda	0	Accident	6	
Ret	6	(Spain) Alex Debón	Honda	0	Accident	12	
Ret	64	(Czech Republic) Radomil Rous	Honda	0	Accident	16	
DNQ	20	(Italy) Gabriele Ferro	Fantic		Did not qualify		
DNQ	60	(China) Wang Zhu	Aprilia		Did not qualify		
DNQ	61	(China) Li Zheng Peng	Aprilia		Did not qualify		

== 125 cc classification ==
Pos.	No.	Rider	Manufacturer	Laps	Time/Retired	Grid	Points
1	12	(Switzerland) Thomas Lüthi	Honda	19	43:02.214	1	25
2	36	(Finland) Mika Kallio	KTM	19	+0.002	4	20
3	75	(Italy) Mattia Pasini	Aprilia	19	+9.684	2	16
4	55	(Spain) Héctor Faubel	Aprilia	19	+9.709	9	13
5	14	(Hungary) Gábor Talmácsi	KTM	19	+9.892	3	11
6	60	(Spain) Julián Simón	KTM	19	+11.936	8	10
7	32	(Italy) Fabrizio Lai	Honda	19	+19.632	13	9
8	54	(San Marino) Manuel Poggiali	Gilera	19	+19.755	7	8
9	58	(Italy) Marco Simoncelli	Aprilia	19	+19.967	5	7
10	71	(Japan) Tomoyoshi Koyama	Honda	19	+20.071	11	6
11	63	(France) Mike Di Meglio	Honda	19	+20.158	10	5
12	52	(Czech Republic) Lukáš Pešek	Derbi	19	+20.427	6	4
13	22	(Spain) Pablo Nieto	Derbi	19	+21.178	23	3
14	7	(France) Alexis Masbou	Honda	19	+24.199	15	2
15	41	(Spain) Aleix Espargaró	Honda	19	+24.266	14	1
16	33	(Spain) Sergio Gadea	Aprilia	19	+24.481	18	
17	6	(Spain) Joan Olivé	Aprilia	19	+24.615	12	
18	29	(Italy) Andrea Iannone	Aprilia	19	+48.038	24	
19	51	(Spain) Enrique Jerez	Derbi	19	+48.157	17	
20	8	(Italy) Lorenzo Zanetti	Aprilia	19	+49.093	19	
21	11	(Germany) Sandro Cortese	Honda	19	+49.207	22	
22	45	(Hungary) Imre Tóth	Aprilia	19	+1:02.994	26	
23	25	(Germany) Dario Giuseppetti	Aprilia	19	+1:03.000	25	
24	43	(Spain) Manuel Hernández	Aprilia	19	+1:03.756	21	
25	46	(Spain) Mateo Túnez	Aprilia	19	+1:11.588	31	
26	19	(Spain) Álvaro Bautista	Honda	19	+1:20.152	20	
27	48	(Spain) David Bonache	Honda	19	+1:23.094	29	
28	28	(Spain) Jordi Carchano	Aprilia	19	+1:32.733	28	
29	38	(China) Cheung Wai On	Honda	19	+1:47.362	37	
30	31	(Germany) Sascha Hommel	Malaguti	19	+1:47.672	35	
31	72	(Indonesia) Doni Tata Pradita	Yamaha	19	+2:20.854	36	
Ret	9	(Japan) Toshihisa Kuzuhara	Honda	17	Accident	27	
Ret	15	(Italy) Michele Pirro	Malaguti	4	Accident	30	
Ret	10	(Italy) Federico Sandi	Honda	0	Accident	34	
Ret	26	(Switzerland) Vincent Braillard	Aprilia	0	Accident	32	
Ret	35	(Italy) Raffaele De Rosa	Aprilia	0	Accident	16	
Ret	44	(Czech Republic) Karel Abraham	Aprilia	0	Accident	33	

== Championship standings after the race (MotoGP) ==
Below are the standings for the top five riders and constructors after round thirteen has concluded.

Riders' Championship standings

Pos.	Rider	Points
1	(Italy) Valentino Rossi	281
2	(Italy) Max Biaggi	159
3	(Italy) Loris Capirossi	142
4	(United States) Colin Edwards	139
5	(Italy) Marco Melandri	137

Constructors' Championship standings

Pos.	Constructor	Points
1	(Japan) Yamaha	295
2	(Japan) Honda	251
3	(Italy) Ducati	152
4	(Japan) Kawasaki	97
5	(Japan) Suzuki	85

- Note: Only the top five positions are included for both sets of standings.

Previous race: 2005 Japanese Grand Prix	FIM Grand Prix World Championship; 2005 season	Next race: 2005 Qatar Grand Prix
Previous race: 2004 Malaysian Grand Prix	Malaysian motorcycle Grand Prix	Next race: 2006 Malaysian Grand Prix
