= 2006 Japanese motorcycle Grand Prix =

(Japan) 2006 Japanese Grand Prix
Race details
- Race 15 of 17 races in the 2006 Grand Prix motorcycle racing season
- Date: 24 September 2006
- Official name: A-Style Grand Prix of Japan
- Location: Twin Ring Motegi
- Course: Permanent racing facility; 4.801 km (2.983 mi)

MotoGP
Pole position
- Rider: (Italy) Loris Capirossi
- Time: 1:45.724
Fastest lap
- Rider: (Italy) Valentino Rossi
- Time: 1:47.288
Podium
- First: (Italy) Loris Capirossi
- Second: (Italy) Valentino Rossi
- Third: (Italy) Marco Melandri

250cc
Pole position
- Rider: (Spain) Jorge Lorenzo
- Time: 1:51.374
Fastest lap
- Rider: (Japan) Hiroshi Aoyama
- Time: 1:52.800
Podium
- First: (Japan) Hiroshi Aoyama
- Second: (San Marino) Alex de Angelis
- Third: (Spain) Jorge Lorenzo

125cc
Pole position
- Rider: (Spain) Álvaro Bautista
- Time: 1:57.231
Fastest lap
- Rider: (Finland) Mika Kallio
- Time: 1:57.666
Podium
- First: (Finland) Mika Kallio
- Second: (Spain) Álvaro Bautista
- Third: (Spain) Julián Simón

The 2006 Japanese motorcycle Grand Prix was the fifteenth race of the 2006 Motorcycle Grand Prix season. It took place on the weekend of 22 –24 September 2006 at the Twin Ring Motegi circuit.

== MotoGP classification ==
Pos.	No.	Rider	Team	Manufacturer	Laps	Time/Retired	Grid	Points
1	65	(Italy) Loris Capirossi	Ducati Marlboro Team	Ducati	24	43:13.585	1	25
2	46	(Italy) Valentino Rossi	Camel Yamaha Team	Yamaha	24	+5.088	2	20
3	33	(Italy) Marco Melandri	Fortuna Honda	Honda	24	+8.378	3	16
4	15	(Spain) Sete Gibernau	Ducati Marlboro Team	Ducati	24	+9.712	5	13
5	69	(United States) Nicky Hayden	Repsol Honda Team	Honda	24	+11.944	7	11
6	24	(Spain) Toni Elías	Fortuna Honda	Honda	24	+18.108	6	10
7	26	(Spain) Dani Pedrosa	Repsol Honda Team	Honda	24	+19.937	9	9
8	5	(United States) Colin Edwards	Camel Yamaha Team	Yamaha	24	+22.492	10	8
9	10	(United States) Kenny Roberts Jr.	Team Roberts	KR211V	24	+26.824	14	7
10	6	(Japan) Makoto Tamada	Konica Minolta Honda	Honda	24	+30.970	18	6
11	71	(Australia) Chris Vermeulen	Rizla Suzuki MotoGP	Suzuki	24	+39.263	15	5
12	21	(United States) John Hopkins	Rizla Suzuki MotoGP	Suzuki	24	+39.440	13	4
13	64	(Japan) Kousuke Akiyoshi	Team Suzuki MotoGP	Suzuki	24	+45.595	12	3
14	7	(Spain) Carlos Checa	Tech 3 Yamaha	Yamaha	24	+49.571	17	2
15	77	(United Kingdom) James Ellison	Tech 3 Yamaha	Yamaha	24	+1:09.085	19	1
16	66	(Germany) Alex Hofmann	Pramac d'Antin MotoGP	Ducati	24	+1:11.747	20	
Ret	56	(Japan) Shinya Nakano	Kawasaki Racing Team	Kawasaki	23	Accident	4	
Ret	27	(Australia) Casey Stoner	Honda LCR	Honda	12	Accident	11	
Ret	17	(France) Randy de Puniet	Kawasaki Racing Team	Kawasaki	8	Accident	8	
Ret	8	(Japan) Naoki Matsudo	Kawasaki	Kawasaki	8	Retirement	16	
Ret	30	(Spain) José Luis Cardoso	Pramac d'Antin MotoGP	Ducati	1	Accident	21	

== 250 cc classification ==
Pos.	No.	Rider	Manufacturer	Laps	Time/Retired	Grid	Points
1	4	(Japan) Hiroshi Aoyama	KTM	23	43:36.310	4	25
2	7	(San Marino) Alex de Angelis	Aprilia	23	+1.341	3	20
3	48	(Spain) Jorge Lorenzo	Aprilia	23	+4.349	1	16
4	34	(Italy) Andrea Dovizioso	Honda	23	+4.530	2	13
5	15	(Italy) Roberto Locatelli	Aprilia	23	+14.864	7	11
6	73	(Japan) Shuhei Aoyama	Honda	23	+24.111	5	10
7	80	(Spain) Héctor Barberá	Aprilia	23	+41.433	8	9
8	86	(Japan) Ryuji Yokoe	Yamaha	23	+41.749	11	8
9	58	(Italy) Marco Simoncelli	Gilera	23	+41.881	15	7
10	87	(Thailand) Ratthapark Wilairot	Honda	23	+42.054	14	6
11	14	(Australia) Anthony West	Aprilia	23	+43.329	18	5
12	54	(San Marino) Manuel Poggiali	KTM	23	+48.247	16	4
13	89	(Japan) Seijin Oikawa	Yamaha	23	+49.242	17	3
14	25	(Italy) Alex Baldolini	Aprilia	23	+59.804	22	2
15	37	(Argentina) Fabricio Perren	Honda	23	+1:00.019	20	1
16	28	(Germany) Dirk Heidolf	Aprilia	23	+1:04.360	21	
17	16	(France) Jules Cluzel	Aprilia	23	+1:06.599	29	
18	44	(Japan) Taro Sekiguchi	Aprilia	23	+1:22.509	28	
19	88	(Japan) Youichi Ui	Yamaha	23	+1:23.416	27	
20	93	(Japan) Kouki Takahashi	Honda	23	+1:23.474	26	
21	23	(Spain) Arturo Tizón	Honda	23	+1:32.896	23	
22	24	(Spain) Jordi Carchano	Aprilia	23	+1:33.263	24	
23	20	(Japan) Takumi Takahashi	Honda	23	+2:03.029	25	
24	85	(Italy) Alessio Palumbo	Aprilia	22	+1 lap	32	
Ret	96	(Czech Republic) Jakub Smrž	Aprilia	17	Retirement	10	
Ret	55	(Japan) Yuki Takahashi	Honda	14	Accident	6	
Ret	50	(France) Sylvain Guintoli	Aprilia	6	Accident	9	
Ret	22	(Italy) Luca Morelli	Aprilia	5	Retirement	31	
Ret	42	(Spain) Aleix Espargaró	Honda	3	Retirement	19	
Ret	8	(Italy) Andrea Ballerini	Aprilia	1	Accident	12	
Ret	52	(Spain) José David de Gea	Honda	1	Accident	13	
DNS	21	(France) Arnaud Vincent	Honda	0	Did not start	30	

== 125 cc classification ==
Pos.	No.	Rider	Manufacturer	Laps	Time/Retired	Grid	Points
1	36	(Finland) Mika Kallio	KTM	21	41:40.970	2	25
2	19	(Spain) Álvaro Bautista	Aprilia	21	+0.185	1	20
3	60	(Spain) Julián Simón	KTM	21	+7.769	4	16
4	75	(Italy) Mattia Pasini	Aprilia	21	+7.907	7	13
5	52	(Czech Republic) Lukáš Pešek	Derbi	21	+7.924	6	11
6	55	(Spain) Héctor Faubel	Aprilia	21	+8.078	3	10
7	71	(Japan) Tomoyoshi Koyama	Malaguti	21	+22.782	10	9
8	38	(United Kingdom) Bradley Smith	Honda	21	+22.911	9	8
9	14	(Hungary) Gábor Talmácsi	Honda	21	+23.192	12	7
10	18	(Spain) Nicolás Terol	Derbi	21	+32.403	18	6
11	32	(Italy) Fabrizio Lai	Honda	21	+39.590	11	5
12	34	(Spain) Esteve Rabat	Honda	21	+39.735	21	4
13	44	(Czech Republic) Karel Abraham	Aprilia	21	+39.817	23	3
14	11	(Germany) Sandro Cortese	Honda	21	+40.011	14	2
15	90	(Japan) Hiroaki Kuzuhara	Aprilia	21	+40.135	17	1
16	53	(Italy) Simone Grotzkyj	Aprilia	21	+43.213	27	
17	26	(Switzerland) Vincent Braillard	Aprilia	21	+49.105	29	
18	20	(Italy) Roberto Tamburini	Aprilia	21	+54.960	26	
19	42	(Spain) Pol Espargaró	Derbi	21	+55.641	20	
20	33	(Spain) Sergio Gadea	Aprilia	21	+55.673	5	
21	87	(Italy) Roberto Lacalendola	Aprilia	21	+1:06.921	34	
22	67	(Australia) Blake Leigh-Smith	KTM	21	+1:07.536	33	
23	9	(Austria) Michael Ranseder	KTM	21	+1:07.695	28	
24	43	(Spain) Manuel Hernández	Aprilia	21	+1:08.696	30	
25	45	(Hungary) Imre Tóth	Aprilia	21	+1:14.767	25	
26	13	(Italy) Dino Lombardi	Aprilia	21	+1:17.503	40	
27	50	(Japan) Hiroomi Iwata	Honda	21	+1:18.114	32	
28	16	(Italy) Michele Conti	Honda	21	+1:20.465	36	
29	37	(Netherlands) Joey Litjens	Honda	21	+1:23.274	39	
30	48	(Japan) Toshihisa Kuzuhara	Honda	21	+1:23.653	37	
31	51	(Japan) Iori Namihira	Honda	21	+1:24.235	38	
Ret	49	(Japan) Kazuma Watanabe	Honda	20	Accident	31	
Ret	12	(Italy) Federico Sandi	Aprilia	17	Retirement	22	
Ret	6	(Spain) Joan Olivé	Aprilia	12	Retirement	19	
Ret	8	(Italy) Lorenzo Zanetti	Aprilia	9	Retirement	15	
Ret	47	(Japan) Shoya Tomizawa	Honda	8	Retirement	35	
Ret	35	(Italy) Raffaele De Rosa	Aprilia	5	Accident	16	
Ret	1	(Switzerland) Thomas Lüthi	Honda	3	Retirement	8	
Ret	63	(France) Mike Di Meglio	Honda	3	Retirement	13	
Ret	73	(Japan) Kazuya Otani	Malaguti	2	Retirement	24	
WD	24	(Italy) Simone Corsi	Gilera		Withdrew		

== Championship standings after the race (MotoGP) ==
Below are the standings for the top five riders and constructors after round fifteen has concluded.

Riders' Championship standings

Pos.	Rider	Points
1	(United States) Nicky Hayden	236
2	(Italy) Valentino Rossi	224
3	(Italy) Marco Melandri	209
4	(Italy) Loris Capirossi	205
5	(Spain) Dani Pedrosa	202

Constructors' Championship standings

Pos.	Constructor	Points
1	(Japan) Honda	319
2	(Japan) Yamaha	262
3	(Italy) Ducati	218
4	(Japan) Suzuki	136
5	(United States) KR211V	110

- Note: Only the top five positions are included for both sets of standings.

Previous race: 2006 Australian Grand Prix	FIM Grand Prix World Championship; 2006 season	Next race: 2006 Portuguese Grand Prix
Previous race: 2005 Japanese Grand Prix	Japanese motorcycle Grand Prix	Next race: 2007 Japanese Grand Prix
