= 2006 Australian motorcycle Grand Prix =

(Australia) 2006 Australian Grand Prix
Race details
- Race 14 of 17 races in the 2006 Grand Prix motorcycle racing season
- Date: 17 September 2006
- Official name: GMC Australian Grand Prix
- Location: Phillip Island Grand Prix Circuit
- Course: Permanent racing facility; 4.448 km (2.764 mi)

MotoGP
Pole position
- Rider: (United States) Nicky Hayden
- Time: 1:29.020
Fastest lap
- Rider: (Italy) Valentino Rossi
- Time: 1:30.917
Podium
- First: (Italy) Marco Melandri
- Second: (Australia) Chris Vermeulen
- Third: (Italy) Valentino Rossi

250cc
Pole position
- Rider: (Spain) Jorge Lorenzo
- Time: 1:32.717
Fastest lap
- Rider: (San Marino) Alex de Angelis
- Time: 1:33.471
Podium
- First: (Spain) Jorge Lorenzo
- Second: (San Marino) Alex de Angelis
- Third: (Japan) Hiroshi Aoyama

125cc
Pole position
- Rider: (Finland) Mika Kallio
- Time: 1:36.625
Fastest lap
- Rider: (Spain) Álvaro Bautista
- Time: 1:36.927
Podium
- First: (Spain) Álvaro Bautista
- Second: (Finland) Mika Kallio
- Third: (Italy) Mattia Pasini

The 2006 Australian motorcycle Grand Prix was the fourteenth race of the 2006 Grand Prix motorcycle racing season. It took place on the weekend of 15–17 September 2006 at the Phillip Island Grand Prix Circuit.

This running of the Australian motorcycle Grand Prix was the only time in Casey Stoner's career where he was entered in the premier class and didn't win the race.

== MotoGP classification ==
Pos.	No.	Rider	Team	Manufacturer	Laps	Time/Retired	Grid	Points
1	33	(Italy) Marco Melandri	Fortuna Honda	Honda	26	44:15.621	7	25
2	71	(Australia) Chris Vermeulen	Rizla Suzuki MotoGP	Suzuki	26	+9.699	16	20
3	46	(Italy) Valentino Rossi	Camel Yamaha Team	Yamaha	26	+10.526	3	16
4	15	(Spain) Sete Gibernau	Ducati Marlboro Team	Ducati	26	+10.615	12	13
5	69	(United States) Nicky Hayden	Repsol Honda Team	Honda	26	+10.694	1	11
6	27	(Australia) Casey Stoner	Honda LCR	Honda	26	+11.323	8	10
7	65	(Italy) Loris Capirossi	Ducati Marlboro Team	Ducati	26	+26.555	13	9
8	56	(Japan) Shinya Nakano	Kawasaki Racing Team	Kawasaki	26	+26.666	2	8
9	24	(Spain) Toni Elías	Fortuna Honda	Honda	26	+57.234	14	7
10	6	(Japan) Makoto Tamada	Konica Minolta Honda	Honda	26	+1:02.231	11	6
11	17	(France) Randy de Puniet	Kawasaki Racing Team	Kawasaki	26	+1:02.432	9	5
12	21	(United States) John Hopkins	Rizla Suzuki MotoGP	Suzuki	26	+1:18.809	15	4
13	66	(Germany) Alex Hofmann	Pramac d'Antin MotoGP	Ducati	26	+1:48.233	17	3
14	10	(United States) Kenny Roberts Jr.	Team Roberts	KR211V	25	+1 lap	4	2
15	26	(Spain) Dani Pedrosa	Repsol Honda Team	Honda	25	+1 lap	10	1
16	77	(United Kingdom) James Ellison	Tech 3 Yamaha	Yamaha	24	+2 laps	18	
17	30	(Spain) José Luis Cardoso	Pramac d'Antin MotoGP	Ducati	23	+3 laps	19	
Ret	7	(Spain) Carlos Checa	Tech 3 Yamaha	Yamaha	16	Accident	6	
Ret	5	(United States) Colin Edwards	Camel Yamaha Team	Yamaha	7	Accident	5	

== 250 cc classification ==
Pos.	No.	Rider	Manufacturer	Laps	Time/Retired	Grid	Points
1	48	(Spain) Jorge Lorenzo	Aprilia	25	39:17.327	1	25
2	7	(San Marino) Alex de Angelis	Aprilia	25	+0.009	2	20
3	4	(Japan) Hiroshi Aoyama	KTM	25	+6.560	6	16
4	34	(Italy) Andrea Dovizioso	Honda	25	+18.196	4	13
5	73	(Japan) Shuhei Aoyama	Honda	25	+36.000	11	11
6	80	(Spain) Héctor Barberá	Aprilia	25	+36.484	7	10
7	15	(Italy) Roberto Locatelli	Aprilia	25	+37.050	10	9
8	96	(Czech Republic) Jakub Smrž	Aprilia	25	+37.134	8	8
9	14	(Australia) Anthony West	Aprilia	25	+59.653	12	7
10	58	(Italy) Marco Simoncelli	Gilera	25	+1:03.829	5	6
11	28	(Germany) Dirk Heidolf	Aprilia	25	+1:03.834	15	5
12	16	(France) Jules Cluzel	Aprilia	25	+1:07.586	19	4
13	54	(San Marino) Manuel Poggiali	KTM	25	+1:07.775	14	3
14	37	(Argentina) Fabricio Perren	Honda	25	+1:07.849	17	2
15	42	(Spain) Aleix Espargaró	Honda	25	+1:08.065	18	1
16	8	(Italy) Andrea Ballerini	Aprilia	25	+1:21.544	13	
17	24	(Spain) Jordi Carchano	Aprilia	25	+1:33.035	21	
18	25	(Italy) Alex Baldolini	Aprilia	24	+1 lap	22	
19	44	(Japan) Taro Sekiguchi	Aprilia	24	+1 lap	24	
20	22	(Italy) Luca Morelli	Aprilia	24	+1 lap	23	
Ret	23	(Spain) Arturo Tizón	Honda	9	Retirement	16	
Ret	55	(Japan) Yuki Takahashi	Honda	8	Retirement	9	
Ret	50	(France) Sylvain Guintoli	Aprilia	2	Accident	3	
Ret	21	(France) Arnaud Vincent	Honda	2	Retirement	20	
DNQ	85	(Italy) Alessio Palumbo	Aprilia		Did not qualify		
WD	36	(Colombia) Martín Cárdenas	Honda		Withdrew		

== 125 cc classification ==
Pos.	No.	Rider	Manufacturer	Laps	Time/Retired	Grid	Points
1	19	(Spain) Álvaro Bautista	Aprilia	15	24:30.115	2	25
2	36	(Finland) Mika Kallio	KTM	15	+3.242	1	20
3	75	(Italy) Mattia Pasini	Aprilia	15	+3.381	6	16
4	1	(Switzerland) Thomas Lüthi	Honda	15	+3.639	4	13
5	60	(Spain) Julián Simón	KTM	15	+3.838	10	11
6	52	(Czech Republic) Lukáš Pešek	Derbi	15	+6.069	3	10
7	35	(Italy) Raffaele De Rosa	Aprilia	15	+6.085	7	9
8	32	(Italy) Fabrizio Lai	Honda	15	+6.572	9	8
9	14	(Hungary) Gábor Talmácsi	Honda	15	+6.704	11	7
10	6	(Spain) Joan Olivé	Aprilia	15	+8.310	5	6
11	18	(Spain) Nicolás Terol	Derbi	15	+13.250	16	5
12	71	(Japan) Tomoyoshi Koyama	Malaguti	15	+13.285	13	4
13	55	(Spain) Héctor Faubel	Aprilia	15	+13.347	8	3
14	11	(Germany) Sandro Cortese	Honda	15	+13.402	18	2
15	63	(France) Mike Di Meglio	Honda	15	+27.746	15	1
16	42	(Spain) Pol Espargaró	Derbi	15	+31.087	29	
17	44	(Czech Republic) Karel Abraham	Aprilia	15	+31.890	22	
18	16	(Italy) Michele Conti	Honda	15	+36.666	24	
19	8	(Italy) Lorenzo Zanetti	Aprilia	15	+41.491	14	
20	9	(Austria) Michael Ranseder	KTM	15	+41.517	28	
21	53	(Italy) Simone Grotzkyj	Aprilia	15	+41.687	35	
22	20	(Italy) Roberto Tamburini	Aprilia	15	+41.882	26	
23	26	(Switzerland) Vincent Braillard	Aprilia	15	+41.910	33	
24	13	(Italy) Dino Lombardi	Aprilia	15	+46.393	30	
25	90	(Japan) Hiroaki Kuzuhara	Aprilia	15	+46.411	27	
26	87	(Italy) Roberto Lacalendola	Aprilia	15	+47.620	32	
27	67	(Australia) Blake Leigh-Smith	KTM	15	+1:03.538	31	
28	38	(United Kingdom) Bradley Smith	Honda	15	+1:34.602	17	
Ret	34	(Spain) Esteve Rabat	Honda	13	Accident	19	
Ret	12	(Italy) Federico Sandi	Aprilia	13	Accident	21	
Ret	45	(Hungary) Imre Tóth	Aprilia	13	Retirement	20	
Ret	59	(Australia) Rhys Moller	Honda	8	Accident	36	
Ret	15	(Italy) Michele Pirro	Honda	4	Retirement	34	
Ret	43	(Spain) Manuel Hernández	Aprilia	2	Retirement	23	
DNS	33	(Spain) Sergio Gadea	Aprilia	0	Did not restart	12	
DNS	37	(Netherlands) Joey Litjens	Honda	0	Did not restart	25	
DNS	22	(Spain) Pablo Nieto	Aprilia		Did not start		
DNS	24	(Italy) Simone Corsi	Gilera		Did not start		
DNQ	58	(Australia) Brett Symonds	Honda		Did not qualify		
DNQ	57	(Australia) Tom Hatton	Honda		Did not qualify		
DNQ	62	(Australia) Brent Rigoli	Honda		Did not qualify		

== Championship standings after the race (MotoGP) ==
Below are the standings for the top five riders and constructors after round fourteen has concluded.

Riders' Championship standings

Pos.	Rider	Points
1	(United States) Nicky Hayden	225
2	(Italy) Valentino Rossi	204
3	(Italy) Marco Melandri	193
4	(Spain) Dani Pedrosa	193
5	(Italy) Loris Capirossi	180

Constructors' Championship standings

Pos.	Constructor	Points
1	(Japan) Honda	303
2	(Japan) Yamaha	242
3	(Italy) Ducati	193
4	(Japan) Suzuki	131
5	(United States) KR211V	103

- Note: Only the top five positions are included for both sets of standings.

Previous race: 2006 Malaysian Grand Prix	FIM Grand Prix World Championship; 2006 season	Next race: 2006 Japanese Grand Prix
Previous race: 2005 Australian Grand Prix	Australian motorcycle Grand Prix	Next race: 2007 Australian Grand Prix
