= Marcel Schrötter =

German motorcycle racer (born 1993)

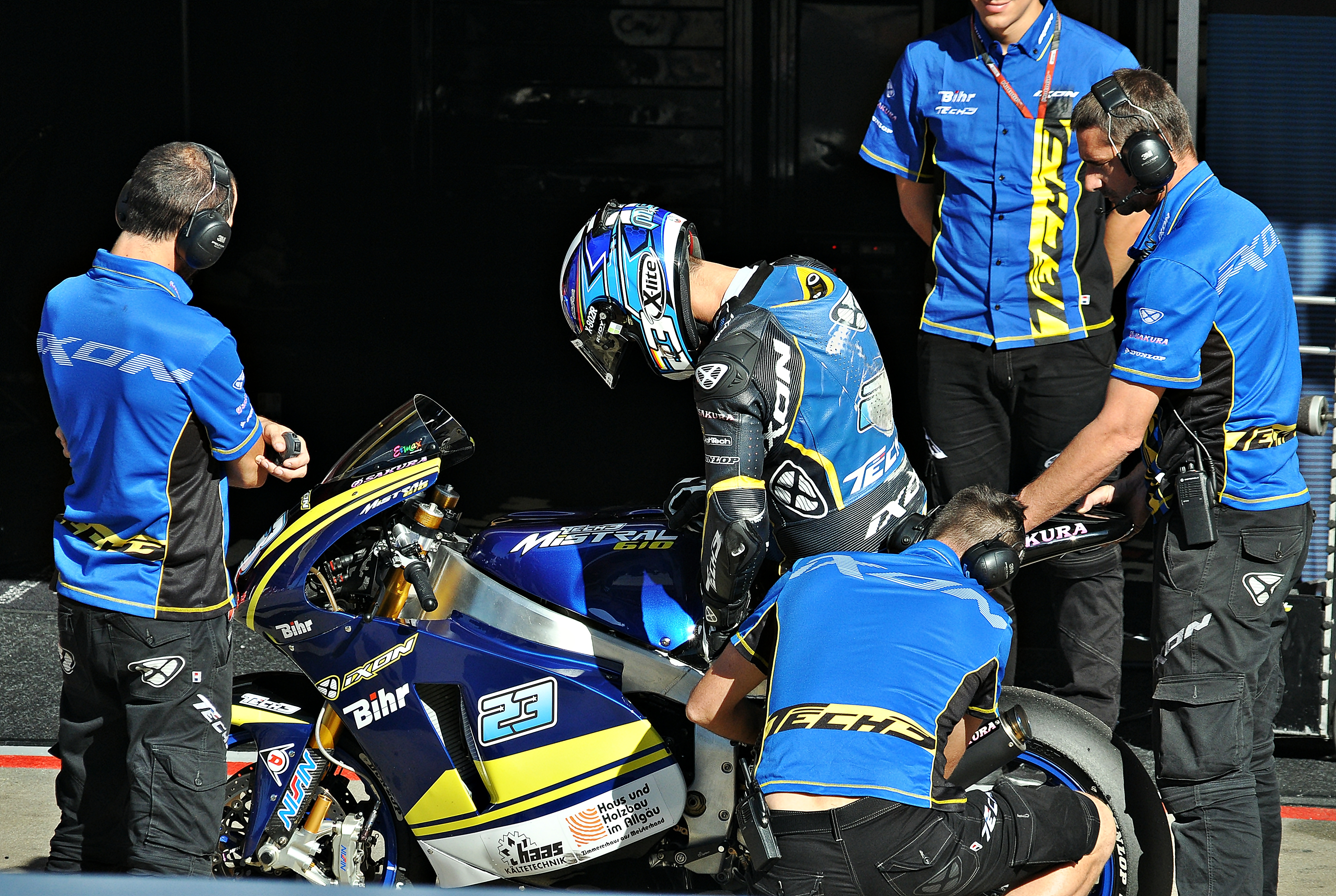
- Schrötter at the 2015 Catalan Grand Prix
- Nationality: German
- Born: 2 January 1993 (age 33); Vilgertshofen, Germany
- Current team: GERT56 by RS Speedbikes
- Bike number: 23
Motorcycle racing career statistics
Moto2 World Championship
Active years	2012–2022, 2024
Manufacturers	Bimota, Kalex, Tech3, Suter
2024 championship position	32nd (0 pts)
Starts / Wins / Podiums / Poles / F. laps / Points; 184 / 0 / 5 / 3 / 0 / 850.5
Moto3 World Championship
Active years	2012
Manufacturers	Mahindra
2012 championship position	33rd (4 pts)
Starts / Wins / Podiums / Poles / F. laps / Points; 8 / 0 / 0 / 0 / 0 / 4
125cc World Championship
Active years	2008–2011
Manufacturers	Honda, Mahindra
Championships	0
2011 championship position	15th (36 pts)
Starts / Wins / Podiums / Poles / F. laps / Points; 38 / 0 / 0 / 0 / 0 / 84
Supersport World Championship
Active years	2022–
Manufacturers	MV Agusta, Ducati
Championships	0
2025 championship position	10th (112 pts)
Starts / Wins / Podiums / Poles / F. laps / Points; 72 / 0 / 12 / 0 / 2 / 643

Marcel Schrötter (born 2 January 1993) is a German motorcycle racer, currently competing in the European Euro Moto 2026 championship.

Born in Vilgertshofen, Schrötter started out in the German 125cc National Championship in 2007 and finished fifth in his debut campaign, before he took back-to-back titles in 2008 and 2009. In the 2008 season, he made his World Championship debut as a wildcard rider at the Sachsenring, before three further races in 2009, with a highly impressive fifth place in the final round of the season at Valencia. In 2009, he also won the European 125cc Championship. He has been racing in the Moto2 class for ten years, scoring five podiums.

== Career ==
=== Early career ===
Schrötter contested his first race in 2002, at the age of nine, when he won the DMSB/dmsj pocket bike junior cup. In 2003, Schrötter switched to the ADAC Mini Bike Cup, where he competed for two years. In 2005, the Bavarian was invited by five-time world champion Toni Mang to his motorcycle training sessions at the Hockenheim and Salzburgring circuits, where he impressed. In the same year, he finished third in the ADAC Junior Cup with one race win, and in 2006 Schrötter achieved four race wins, improving to second place in the overall standings.

=== National championship ===
Since 2007, Schrötter has been coached and supported by Toni Mang, who takes care of sporting and technical matters, as well as finding sponsors. Sepp Schlögl and Adi Stadler are in charge of the motorbike and business decisions. Schrötter competed for the Toni Mang team on Honda RS125 in the 125cc class of the International German Motorcycle Championship (IDM). In his very first race in this class at the Lausitzring, at the age of 14, he took second place behind the eventual German champion Georg Fröhlich. Schrötter finished the 2007 season in fifth place overall.

In the 2008 season, Schrötter celebrated his first IDM victory at the first round of the season at the Lausitzring. As the season progressed, Schrötter achieved a further four victories, narrowly beating Dutchman Joey Litjens in the overall standings to win the eight-liter title. He also competed sporadically in the Spanish championship, where he won the first round of the season in Valencia.

In 2009, Schrötter dominated the IDM 125, winning the first three races at the Lausitzring, Oschersleben and Nürburgring. At the Sachsenring, the Bavarian had to admit defeat to Jonas Folger and Jakub Kornfeil, but since they were not eligible for points in the 125cc IDM, he also received the maximum 25 points here. After finishing second at the Salzburgring, Schrötter secured his second German championship title at the age of 16, with victory at the Schleizer Dreieck on August 2, 2009, two rounds before the end of the season. He is the first rider since Alfred Waibel in 1988 to succeed in defending his 125cc title.

=== 125cc World Championship ===
Schrötter made his Grand Prix motorcycle racing debut in the 2008 season, in the 125cc class at the German Grand Prix at the Sachsenring, one of his favorite circuits. He started as a wildcard rider and scored three world championship points straight away, finishing 13th.

In 2009, again riding as a wildcard at Sachsenring, Schrötter qualified fourth on the grid in wet conditions. He finished the race in twelfth place, scoring four points. He would also enter the Czech Grand Prix and the Valencia Grand Prix this year, finishing in 13th and fifth respectively. These good results earned him a full-time ride for next season.

Schrötter competed in the 2010 season for Team Interwetten Honda 125 on a Honda 125cc. He scored points in ten races that season, but ended no higher than 12th in any races. He finished with 27 total points and 18th in the championship.

==== Mahindra Racing (2011–2012) ====
In 2011, Schrötter competed in the same 125cc class for the Indian Mahindra Racing factory team. He had a virtually identical season, finishing in the points nine times, with a season's best of ninth in Assen. He ended the championship in 15th place, with 36 total points.

Schrötter stayed for one last year in the smallest class, which has been re-branded from 125cc class, to Moto3. He was partnered at Mahindra by Danny Webb. He had an awful start to the year, finishing in the points only once in eight races, a 12th place in Le Mans, and so he was dropped by Mahindra, being replaced by Riccardo Moretti.

=== Moto2 World Championship ===
==== SAG Team (2012–2013) ====
Luckily for Schrötter, in the 2012 Moto2 World Championship, Ángel Rodríguez also had a weak start to the season, and was dropped by SAG Team after eight non-point scoring races. Schrötter replaced Rodríguez, but failed to score points in the last eight remaining races.

Schrötter was partnered at SAG Team by Xavier Siméon for the 2013 Moto2 World Championship, and the pair scored solid points throughout the season. Schrötter scored points in twelve races, and finished 16th place in the championship with 38 points.

==== Tech 3 (2014–2015) ====
Schrötter joined Tech 3 Racing on KTM bikes for the 2014 Moto2 World Championship, and improved on new machinery. He was a steady points finisher throughout the year, scoring points in 15 races. He finished the season tenth in the standings, with 80 points in total.

Staying with Tech3 for the 2015 season as well, Schrötter's performance declined. He scored points in only nine races, and ended the year with 32 total points, only good enough for 20th in the rider's championship.

==== AGR Team (2016) ====
Needing a change of scenery, Schrötter was signed by AGR Team, to partner Axel Pons in the 2016 Moto2 World Championship. He had a better year than prior, with the highlight of the season being a fifth place finish in Spielberg, Austria. He scored points in 12 races, finishing 14th in the standings with 64 total points.

==== Intact GP (2017–2022) ====
With Jonas Folger moving up to the MotoGP class, a spot opened up next to Sandro Cortese on the other Dynavolt Intact GP bike. The German team wanted two German riders, and so Schrötter was signed for the 2017 Moto2 World Championship. Folger had a win, two second places, and two third places in 2016, something which Schrötter could not replicate in 2017. He ended the year 17th in the championship, with 50 points, seven more than teammate Cortese.

The 2018 season was Schrötter's breakthrough year in the intermediate class, regular top-tens at the beginning of the season, and three fourth places in France, Catalonia, and the Netherlands meant that he was closer to that first podium than ever before. Following a sixth place in Germany, a seventh place in Czechia, and a seventh place in Austria, Schrötter scored his maiden Moto2 podium in Rimini, a third place behind Francesco Bagnaia and Miguel Oliveira, the top-two in the championship. Schrötter finished the year eighth in the standings, with 147 points.

Staying with Intact GP for 2019, Schrötter would have the best start to the season in his career. Starting from pole position for the first time in his career, he finished third in the opening GP in Qatar, and then fifth in Argentina. He also scored another pole-position in the United States, and finished the race in second, which meant that he scored more podiums in three races, then he did in the prior seven seasons combined. He would add one more podium during the year, at his home German Grand Prix at the Sachsenring, finishing behind Álex Márquez and Brad Binder, the first two riders in the standings, fighting for the title. Schrötter finished the season eighth in the championship, with 137 points.

Schrötter would score his final podium up-to-date in the 2020 season of the Moto2 class Austrian GP, finishing behind Jorge Martín and Luca Marini. He was a regular point scorer throughout the COVID-19 shortened season, finishing ninth in the standings, with 81 total points.

Schrötter had an average 2021 season, a season's best result of fifth coming in Mugello. He finished the year tenth in the championship, with 98 points.

The 2022 season would not start the best for Schrötter, with a tenth, a 16th and a 12th place in Qatar, Indonesia and Argentina respectively, but the following seven races were superb from the Bavarian. fourth in Austin, fourth in Portimao, fifth in Jerez, sixth in Le Mans, ninth in Mugello, fifth in Barcelona, and a fourth place at his home German GP meant that he was steadily in the top-ten of the championship. On September 3 however, shortly after the end of the summer break, Schrötter announced that this was his last season with the Intact GP Team, and he will be looking for a new challenge in 2023.

=== Supersport World Championship ===
==== MV Agusta Reparto Corse (2022) ====
In 2022, Schrötter made his World Superbike debut in Australia round with the MV Agusta Reparto Corse.

=== EuroMoto ===
In 2026, Schrötter will race alongside Toni Finsterbusch and Jan-Ole Jähnig in the GERT56 Team in the EuroMoto Superbike Championship.

== Career statistics ==
=== Grand Prix motorcycle racing ===
==== By season ====
Season	Class	Motorcycle	Team	Race	Win	Podium	Pole	FLap	Pts	Plcd
2008	125cc	Honda	Toni Mang Team	1	0	0	0	0	3	30th
2009	125cc	Honda	Toni Mang Team	3	0	0	0	0	18	23rd
2010	125cc	Honda	Interwetten Honda 125	17	0	0	0	0	27	18th
2011	125cc	Mahindra	Mahindra Racing	17	0	0	0	0	36	15th
2012	Moto3	Mahindra	Mahindra Racing	8	0	0	0	0	4	33rd
2012	Moto2	Bimota	Desguaces La Torre SAG	8	0	0	0	0	0	NC
2013	Moto2	Kalex	Maptaq SAG Team Zelos	17	0	0	0	0	38	16th
2014	Moto2	Tech 3	Tech 3	18	0	0	0	0	80	10th
2015	Moto2	Tech 3	Tech 3	18	0	0	0	0	32	20th
2016	Moto2	Kalex	AGR Team	18	0	0	0	0	64	14th
2017	Moto2	Suter	Dynavolt Intact GP	14	0	0	0	0	50	17th
2018	Moto2	Kalex	Dynavolt Intact GP	18	0	1	0	0	147	8th
2019	Moto2	Kalex	Dynavolt Intact GP	17	0	3	3	0	137	8th
2020	Moto2	Kalex	Liqui Moly Intact GP	15	0	1	0	0	81	9th
2021	Moto2	Kalex	Liqui Moly Intact GP	18	0	0	0	0	98	10th
2022	Moto2	Kalex	Liqui Moly Intact GP	20	0	0	0	0	123.5	11th
2024	Moto2	Kalex	Red Bull KTM Ajo	3	0	0	0	0	0	32nd
Total				**230**	**0**	**5**	**3**	**0**	**938.5**	

==== By class ====
Class	Seasons	1st GP	1st pod	1st win	Race	Win	Podiums	Pole	FLap	Pts	WChmp
125cc	2008–2011	2008 Germany			38	0	0	0	0	84	0
Moto3	2012	2012 Qatar			8	0	0	0	0	4	0
Moto2	2012–2022, 2024	2012 Indianapolis	2018 San Marino		184	0	5	3	0	850.5	0
Total	2008–2022, 2024				**230**	**0**	**5**	**3**	**0**	**938.5**	**0**

==== Races by year ====
(key) (Races in bold indicate pole position, races in italics indicate fastest lap)

Year	Class	Bike	1	2	3	4	5	6	7	8	9	10	11	12	13	14	15	16	17	18	19	20	Pos	Pts
2008	125cc	Honda	QAT	SPA	POR	CHN	FRA	ITA	CAT	GBR	NED	GER; 13	CZE	RSM	INP	JPN	AUS	MAL	VAL				30th	3
2009	125cc	Honda	QAT	JPN	SPA	FRA	ITA	CAT	NED	GER; 12	GBR	CZE; 13	INP	RSM	POR	AUS	MAL	VAL; 5					23rd	18
2010	125cc	Honda	QAT; 16	SPA; 12	FRA; 18	ITA; 13	GBR; 17	NED; 18	CAT; 14	GER; 14	CZE; 13	INP; Ret	RSM; 17	ARA; 13	JPN; 14	MAL; 15	AUS; 13	POR; Ret	VAL; 12				18th	27
2011	125cc	Mahindra	QAT; 21	SPA; 13	POR; 18	FRA; Ret	CAT; 16	GBR; Ret	NED; 9	ITA; 11	GER; 16	CZE; 14	INP; Ret	RSM; 15	ARA; 11	JPN; 12	AUS; 11	MAL; Ret	VAL; 12				15th	36
2012	Moto3	Mahindra	QAT; Ret	SPA; 16	POR; 19	FRA; 12	CAT; Ret	GBR; 26	NED; Ret	GER; Ret	ITA												33rd	4
2012	Moto2	Bimota										INP; 22	CZE; 22	RSM; 21	ARA; 19	JPN; 23	MAL; 17	AUS; 19	VAL; 21				NC	0
2013	Moto2	Kalex	QAT; 13	AME; 11	SPA; 10	FRA; 13	ITA; 12	CAT; Ret	NED; 13	GER; Ret	INP; 15	CZE; Ret	GBR; 16	RSM; 13	ARA; 12	MAL; 14	AUS; 21	JPN; 12	VAL; 18				16th	38
2014	Moto2	Tech 3	QAT; Ret	AME; 9	ARG; 11	SPA; Ret	FRA; 11	ITA; 12	CAT; 9	NED; 12	GER; 12	INP; 14	CZE; 10	GBR; 14	RSM; 11	ARA; 10	JPN; 29	AUS; 7	MAL; 10	VAL; 8			10th	80
2015	Moto2	Tech 3	QAT; 16	AME; 13	ARG; 16	SPA; 10	FRA; 13	ITA; 16	CAT; 16	NED; 18	GER; Ret	INP; 14	CZE; 19	GBR; 11	RSM; 17	ARA; 15	JPN; 9	AUS; 12	MAL; Ret	VAL; 15			20th	32
2016	Moto2	Kalex	QAT; 17	ARG; 11	AME; 10	ESP; Ret	FRA; 14	ITA; 18	CAT; 10	NED; 13	GER; Ret	AUT; 5	CZE; 18	GBR; 11	RSM; 11	ARA; 15	JPN; 9	AUS; 9	MAL; 20	VAL; 10			14th	64
2017	Moto2	Suter	QAT; 16	ARG; 11	AME; 8	SPA; 6	FRA; 12	ITA; 11	CAT; Ret	NED; 11	GER; 9	CZE; DNS	AUT	GBR	RSM	ARA; Ret	JPN; 13	AUS; Ret	MAL; 17	VAL; 13			17th	50
2018	Moto2	Kalex	QAT; 7	ARG; 10	AME; Ret	SPA; 7	FRA; 4	ITA; Ret	CAT; 4	NED; 4	GER; 6	CZE; 7	AUT; 7	GBR; C	RSM; 3	ARA; 5	THA; Ret	JPN; 10	AUS; 9	MAL; 9	VAL; 7		8th	147
2019	Moto2	Kalex	**QAT**; 3	ARG; 5	**AME**; 2	SPA; 15	FRA; 8	**ITA**; 8	CAT; 7	NED; 8	GER; 3	CZE; 6	AUT; 9	GBR; 14	RSM; DNS	ARA	THA; 14	JPN; 9	AUS; 11	MAL; 9	VAL; 16		8th	137
2020	Moto2	Kalex	QAT; 7	SPA; Ret	ANC; 10	CZE; 15	AUT; 3	STY; 11	RSM; Ret	EMI; 5	CAT; 10	FRA; 10	ARA; 15	TER; 20	EUR; 13	VAL; 4	POR; 12						9th	81
2021	Moto2	Kalex	QAT; 8	DOH; Ret	POR; 10	SPA; 10	FRA; 6	ITA; 5	CAT; 8	GER; 6	NED; 9	STY; 10	AUT; 23	GBR; 13	ARA; 11	RSM; 12	AME; Ret	EMI; 15	ALR; 10	VAL; 9			10th	98
2022	Moto2	Kalex	QAT; 10	INA; 16	ARG; 12	AME; 4	POR; 4	SPA; 5	FRA; 6	ITA; 9	CAT; 5	GER; 4	NED; Ret	GBR; Ret	AUT; 8	RSM; 11	ARA; Ret	JPN; 13	THA; 15^{‡}	AUS; 13	MAL; 6	VAL; 10	11th	123.5
2024	Moto2	Kalex	QAT	POR	AME	SPA	FRA	CAT	ITA	NED; 18	GER; 17	GBR; 17	AUT	ARA	RSM	EMI	INA	JPN	AUS	THA	MAL	SLD	32nd	0

^{‡} Half points awarded as less than two thirds of the race distance (but at least three full laps) was completed.
* Season still in progress.

=== Supersport World Championship ===
==== Races by year ====
(key) (Races in bold indicate pole position; races in italics indicate fastest lap)

Year	Bike	1		2		3		4		5		6		7		8		9		10		11		12		Pos	Pts
Year	Bike	R1	R2	R1	R2	R1	R2	R1	R2	R1	R2	R1	R2	R1	R2	R1	R2	R1	R2	R1	R2	R1	R2	R1	R2	Pos	Pts
2022	MV Agusta	SPA	SPA	NED	NED	POR	POR	ITA	ITA	GBR	GBR	CZE	CZE	FRA	FRA	SPA	SPA	POR	POR	ARG	ARG	INA	INA	AUS; Ret	AUS; 7	29th	9
2023	MV Agusta	AUS; 7	AUS; 4	INA; 4	INA; 5	NED; 2	NED; 4	SPA; 2	SPA; 2	EMI; 4	EMI; 3	GBR; 8	GBR; Ret	ITA; 2	ITA; 8	CZE; 6	CZE; 2	FRA; 7	FRA; 4	SPA; 2	SPA; 5	POR; 4	POR; 4	ARG; 15	ARG; Ret	3rd	294
2024	MV Agusta	AUS; 3	AUS; 2	SPA; 3	SPA; 2	NED; 12	NED; 8	EMI; 6	EMI; 6	GBR; Ret	GBR; 11	CZE; 7	CZE; 9	POR; 7	POR; 8	FRA; 17	FRA; 10	ITA; 4	ITA; 4	SPA; 11	SPA; 7	POR; 6	POR; 10	SPA; 4	SPA; 5	5th	228
2025	Ducati	AUS; 3	AUS; Ret	POR; 6	POR; 8	NED; 25	NED; 6	ITA; 10	ITA; 11	CZE; 4	CZE; 4	EMI; 6	EMI; Ret	GBR; 12	GBR; Ret	HUN; 13	HUN; 11	FRA; NC	FRA; 11	ARA; 14	ARA; 14	EST; Ret	EST; 16	SPA	SPA	10th	112

=== Australian Superbike Championship ===
==== Races by year ====
(key) (Races in bold indicate pole position; races in italics indicate fastest lap)

Year	Bike	1		2		3		4			5		6			7		Pos	Pts
Year	Bike	R1	R2	R1	R2	R1	R2	R1	R2	R3	R1	R2	R1	R2	R3	R1	R2	Pos	Pts
2022	Yamaha	PHI	PHI	QUE	QUE	WAK	WAK	HID	HID	HID	MOR	MOR	PHI	PHI	PHI	BEN; 10	BEN; DSQ	33rd	11

=== Suzuka 8 Hours results ===
Year	Class	Team	Co-riders	Bike	Pos
2025	**EWC**	(Japan) SDG-Ducati Team Kagayama	(United Kingdom) Leon Haslam (Japan) Ryo Mizuno	Ducati Panigale V4	29th
2026	**EWC**	(Germany) ERC Endurance #6	(France) Kenny Foray (Germany) Jan-Ole Jähnig	BMW M1000RR	TBD

=== EuroMoto Championship ===
==== By season ====
Season	Class	Motorcycle	Team	Race	Win	Podium	Pole	FLap	Pts	Plcd
2026	Superbike	BMW	GERT56 by RS Speedbikes	2*	0*	1*	0*	0*	33*	2nd*
