= 2017 German motorcycle Grand Prix =

Motorcycle race

(Germany) 2017 German Grand Prix
Race details
- Race 9 of 18 races in the 2017 Grand Prix motorcycle racing season
- Date: 2 July 2017
- Official name: GoPro Motorrad Grand Prix Deutschland
- Location: Sachsenring
- Course: Permanent racing facility; 3.671 km (2.281 mi)

MotoGP
Pole position
Rider	(Spain) Marc Márquez	Honda
Time	1:27.302	
Fastest lap
Rider	(Germany) Jonas Folger	Yamaha
Time	1:21.442 on lap 4	
Podium
First	(Spain) Marc Márquez	Honda
Second	(Germany) Jonas Folger	Yamaha
Third	(Spain) Dani Pedrosa	Honda

Moto2
Pole position
Rider	(Italy) Franco Morbidelli	Kalex
Time	1:32.159	
Fastest lap
Rider	(Portugal) Miguel Oliveira	KTM
Time	1:24.483 on lap 10	
Podium
First	(Italy) Franco Morbidelli	Kalex
Second	(Portugal) Miguel Oliveira	KTM
Third	(Italy) Francesco Bagnaia	Kalex

Moto3
Pole position
Rider	(Spain) Arón Canet	Honda
Time	1:26.688	
Fastest lap
Rider	(Spain) Joan Mir	Honda
Time	1:27.340 on lap 4	
Podium
First	(Spain) Joan Mir	Honda
Second	(Italy) Romano Fenati	Honda
Third	(Spain) Marcos Ramírez	KTM

The 2017 German motorcycle Grand Prix was the ninth round of the 2017 MotoGP season. It was held at the Sachsenring in Hohenstein-Ernstthal on 2 July 2017.

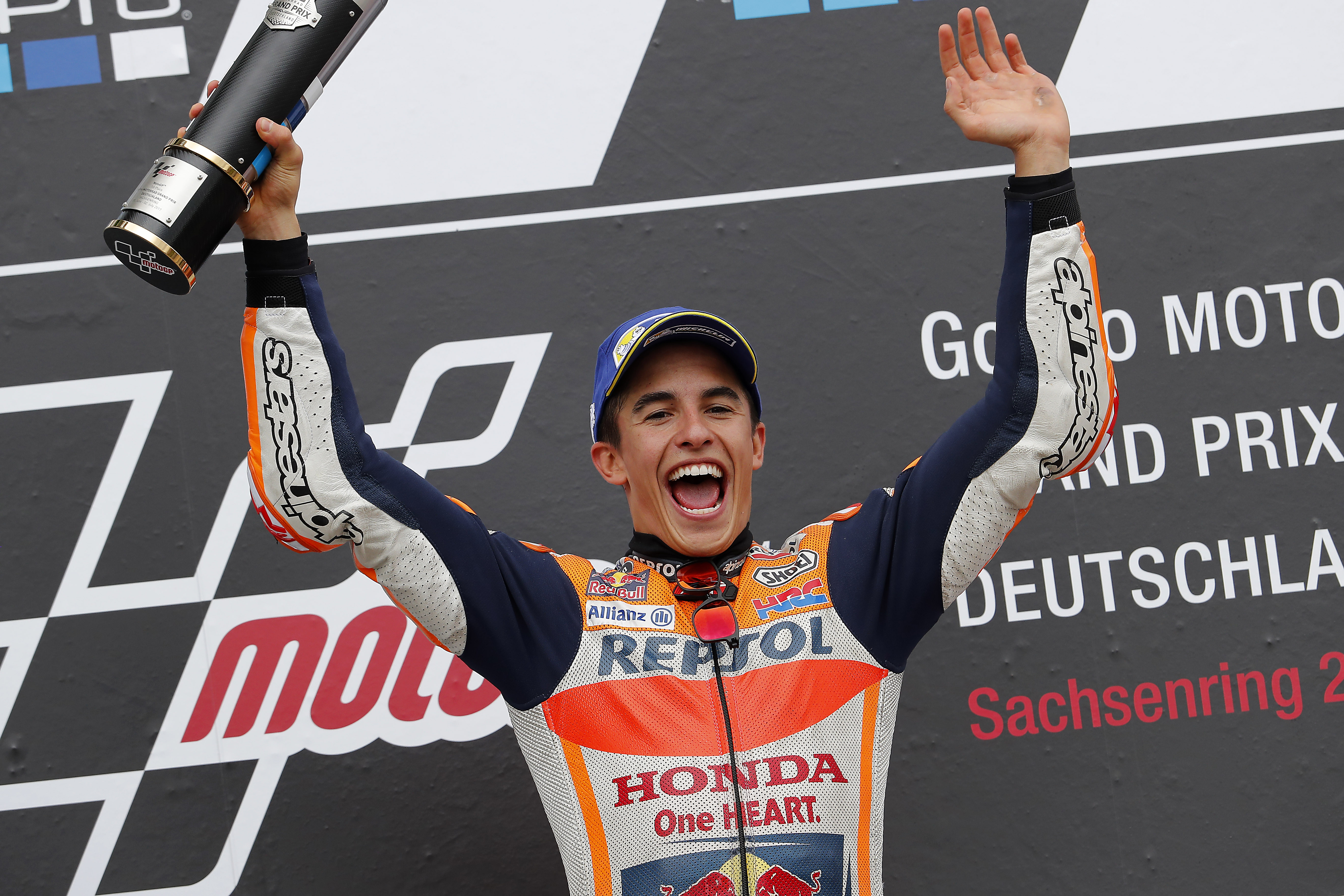
Marc Márquez, celebrating on the podium after winning the MotoGP race.

== Classification ==
=== MotoGP ===
Pos.	No.	Rider	Team	Manufacturer	Laps	Time/Retired	Grid	Points
1	93	(Spain) Marc Márquez	Repsol Honda Team	Honda	30	40:59.525	1	25
2	94	(Germany) Jonas Folger	Monster Yamaha Tech 3	Yamaha	30	+3.310	5	20
3	26	(Spain) Dani Pedrosa	Repsol Honda Team	Honda	30	+11.546	3	16
4	25	(Spain) Maverick Viñales	Movistar Yamaha MotoGP	Yamaha	30	+14.253	11	13
5	46	(Italy) Valentino Rossi	Movistar Yamaha MotoGP	Yamaha	30	+14.980	9	11
6	19	(Spain) Álvaro Bautista	Pull&Bear Aspar Team	Ducati	30	+16.534	12	10
7	41	(Spain) Aleix Espargaró	Aprilia Racing Team Gresini	Aprilia	30	+19.736	8	9
8	4	(Italy) Andrea Dovizioso	Ducati Team	Ducati	30	+20.188	10	8
9	5	(France) Johann Zarco	Monster Yamaha Tech 3	Yamaha	30	+21.138	19	7
10	35	(United Kingdom) Cal Crutchlow	LCR Honda	Honda	30	+24.210	4	6
11	99	(Spain) Jorge Lorenzo	Ducati Team	Ducati	30	+25.659	6	5
12	9	(Italy) Danilo Petrucci	Octo Pramac Racing	Ducati	30	+31.540	2	4
13	44	(Spain) Pol Espargaró	Red Bull KTM Factory Racing	KTM	30	+32.179	7	3
14	38	(United Kingdom) Bradley Smith	Red Bull KTM Factory Racing	KTM	30	+36.453	15	2
15	43	(Australia) Jack Miller	EG 0,0 Marc VDS	Honda	30	+37.771	13	1
16	36	(Finland) Mika Kallio	Red Bull KTM Factory Racing	KTM	30	+37.852	17	
17	17	(Czech Republic) Karel Abraham	Pull&Bear Aspar Team	Ducati	30	+39.323	20	
18	53	(Spain) Tito Rabat	EG 0,0 Marc VDS	Honda	30	+41.190	24	
19	76	(France) Loris Baz	Reale Avintia Racing	Ducati	30	+59.850	14	
20	45	(United Kingdom) Scott Redding	Octo Pramac Racing	Ducati	30	+1:01.664	23	
21	42	(Spain) Álex Rins	Team Suzuki Ecstar	Suzuki	30	+1:01.695	22	
Ret	29	(Italy) Andrea Iannone	Team Suzuki Ecstar	Suzuki	24	Accident	16	
Ret	22	(United Kingdom) Sam Lowes	Aprilia Racing Team Gresini	Aprilia	12	Accident	21	
DSQ	8	(Spain) Héctor Barberá	Reale Avintia Racing	Ducati	9	Disqualified	18	
Sources:

- Héctor Barberá was disqualified for ignoring a jump start ride-through penalty.

=== Moto2 ===
Pos.	No.	Rider	Manufacturer	Laps	Time/Retired	Grid	Points
1	21	(Italy) Franco Morbidelli	Kalex	29	41:05.137	1	25
2	44	(Portugal) Miguel Oliveira	KTM	29	+0.066	6	20
3	42	(Italy) Francesco Bagnaia	Kalex	29	+0.574	10	16
4	24	(Italy) Simone Corsi	Speed Up	29	+0.749	8	13
5	54	(Italy) Mattia Pasini	Kalex	29	+1.300	4	11
6	9	(Spain) Jorge Navarro	Kalex	29	+8.958	16	10
7	41	(South Africa) Brad Binder	KTM	29	+9.204	19	9
8	11	(Germany) Sandro Cortese	Suter	29	+15.099	3	8
9	23	(Germany) Marcel Schrötter	Suter	29	+17.875	12	7
10	30	(Japan) Takaaki Nakagami	Kalex	29	+19.291	23	6
11	55	(Malaysia) Hafizh Syahrin	Kalex	29	+20.767	11	5
12	87	(Australia) Remy Gardner	Tech 3	29	+21.533	13	4
13	40	(France) Fabio Quartararo	Kalex	29	+24.635	9	3
14	19	(Belgium) Xavier Siméon	Kalex	29	+27.357	18	2
15	62	(Italy) Stefano Manzi	Kalex	29	+27.411	25	1
16	2	(Switzerland) Jesko Raffin	Kalex	29	+37.620	24	
17	68	(Colombia) Yonny Hernández	Kalex	29	+44.500	21	
18	45	(Japan) Tetsuta Nagashima	Kalex	29	+44.556	14	
19	57	(Spain) Edgar Pons	Kalex	29	+48.711	20	
20	89	(Malaysia) Khairul Idham Pawi	Kalex	29	+49.534	30	
21	27	(Spain) Iker Lecuona	Kalex	29	+52.511	28	
22	32	(Spain) Isaac Viñales	Kalex	29	+1:04.259	27	
23	6	(United Kingdom) Tarran Mackenzie	Suter	29	+1:12.905	26	
24	22	(Italy) Federico Fuligni	Kalex	29	+1:18.109	29	
Ret	12	(Switzerland) Thomas Lüthi	Kalex	11	Accident	7	
Ret	77	(Switzerland) Dominique Aegerter	Suter	7	Electronics	15	
Ret	73	(Spain) Álex Márquez	Kalex	4	Accident	2	
Ret	14	(Spain) Héctor Garzó	Tech 3	2	Accident	5	
Ret	5	(Italy) Andrea Locatelli	Kalex	2	Accident	22	
DSQ	37	(Spain) Augusto Fernández	Speed Up	18	Disqualified	17	
DNS	49	(Spain) Axel Pons	Kalex		Did not start		
DNS	10	(Italy) Luca Marini	Kalex		Did not start		
OFFICIAL MOTO2 REPORT

- Axel Pons crashed during Sunday morning warm-up session and was ruled out of the race.
- Luca Marini withdrew from the event citing left shoulder pain which he originally sustained in a crash during French GP.

=== Moto3 ===
Pos.	No.	Rider	Manufacturer	Laps	Time/Retired	Grid	Points
1	36	(Spain) Joan Mir	Honda	27	39:34.775	2	25
2	5	(Italy) Romano Fenati	Honda	27	+0.121	6	20
3	42	(Spain) Marcos Ramírez	KTM	27	+0.218	4	16
4	8	(Italy) Nicolò Bulega	KTM	27	+5.074	3	13
5	65	(Germany) Philipp Öttl	KTM	27	+13.073	7	11
6	33	(Italy) Enea Bastianini	Honda	27	+13.650	9	10
7	11	(Belgium) Livio Loi	Honda	27	+14.318	13	9
8	64	(Netherlands) Bo Bendsneyder	KTM	27	+14.466	8	8
9	24	(Japan) Tatsuki Suzuki	Honda	27	+14.583	12	7
10	40	(South Africa) Darryn Binder	KTM	27	+14.666	16	6
11	21	(Italy) Fabio Di Giannantonio	Honda	27	+15.438	24	5
12	58	(Spain) Juan Francisco Guevara	KTM	27	+16.146	11	4
13	7	(Malaysia) Adam Norrodin	Honda	27	+16.234	14	3
14	95	(France) Jules Danilo	Honda	27	+16.324	25	2
15	12	(Italy) Marco Bezzecchi	Mahindra	27	+17.603	17	1
16	16	(Italy) Andrea Migno	KTM	27	+17.752	22	
17	71	(Japan) Ayumu Sasaki	Honda	27	+17.845	20	
18	84	(Czech Republic) Jakub Kornfeil	Peugeot	27	+17.863	18	
19	48	(Italy) Lorenzo Dalla Porta	Mahindra	27	+40.054	23	
20	96	(Italy) Manuel Pagliani	Mahindra	27	+40.254	21	
21	27	(Japan) Kaito Toba	Honda	27	+40.521	19	
22	31	(Spain) Raúl Fernández	Mahindra	27	+1:09.377	27	
23	41	(Thailand) Nakarin Atiratphuvapat	Honda	27	+1:09.466	26	
24	77	(Germany) Tim Georgi	KTM	27	+1:09.590	30	
25	4	(Finland) Patrik Pulkkinen	Peugeot	27	+1:13.004	29	
26	6	(Spain) María Herrera	KTM	25	+2 laps	31 (Note: 12-place grid penalty.)	
Ret	19	(Argentina) Gabriel Rodrigo	KTM	26	Accident	15	
Ret	14	(Italy) Tony Arbolino	Honda	19	Accident	5	
Ret	44	(Spain) Arón Canet	Honda	15	Accident	1	
Ret	52	(United Kingdom) Danny Kent	KTM	15	Accident	28	
Ret	17	(United Kingdom) John McPhee	Honda	6	Accident	10	
DNS	88	(Spain) Jorge Martín	Honda		Did not start		
OFFICIAL MOTO3 REPORT

- Jorge Martín suffered a broken ankle in a crash during free practice and withdrew from the event.

== Championship standings after the race ==
=== MotoGP ===
Below are the standings for the top five riders and constructors after round nine has concluded.

Riders' Championship standings

Pos.	Rider	Points
1	(Spain) Marc Márquez	129
2	(Spain) Maverick Viñales	124
3	(Italy) Andrea Dovizioso	123
4	(Italy) Valentino Rossi	119
5	(Spain) Dani Pedrosa	103

Constructors' Championship standings

Pos.	Constructor	Points
1	(Japan) Yamaha	184
2	(Japan) Honda	166
3	(Italy) Ducati	152
4	(Japan) Suzuki	35
5	(Italy) Aprilia	34

- Note: Only the top five positions are included for both sets of standings.

=== Moto2 ===
Pos.	Rider	Points
1	(Italy) Franco Morbidelli	174
2	(Switzerland) Thomas Lüthi	140
3	(Portugal) Miguel Oliveira	117
4	(Spain) Álex Márquez	113
5	(Italy) Francesco Bagnaia	78
6	(Italy) Mattia Pasini	73
7	(Japan) Takaaki Nakagami	69
8	(Italy) Simone Corsi	53
9	(Switzerland) Dominique Aegerter	50
10	(Germany) Marcel Schrötter	44

=== Moto3 ===
Pos.	Rider	Points
1	(Spain) Joan Mir	165
2	(Italy) Romano Fenati	128
3	(Spain) Arón Canet	110
4	(Spain) Jorge Martín	89
5	(Italy) Fabio Di Giannantonio	85
6	(United Kingdom) John McPhee	83
7	(Spain) Marcos Ramírez	79
8	(Italy) Andrea Migno	78
9	(Italy) Enea Bastianini	59
10	(Spain) Juan Francisco Guevara	58

== Notes ==
Previous race: 2017 Dutch TT	FIM Grand Prix World Championship; 2017 season	Next race: 2017 Czech Republic Grand Prix
Previous race: 2016 German Grand Prix	German motorcycle Grand Prix	Next race: 2018 German Grand Prix
