= 2015 Dutch TT =

(Netherlands) 2015 Dutch Grand Prix
Race details
- Race 8 of 18 races in the 2015 Grand Prix motorcycle racing season
- Date: 27 June 2015
- Official name: Motul TT Assen
- Location: TT Circuit Assen
- Course: Permanent racing facility; 4.542 km (2.822 mi)

MotoGP
Pole position
| Rider | (Italy) Valentino Rossi | Yamaha |
| Time | 1:32.627 | |
Fastest lap
| Rider | (Spain) Marc Márquez | Honda |
| Time | 1:33.617 on lap 4 | |
Podium
| First | (Italy) Valentino Rossi | Yamaha |
| Second | (Spain) Marc Márquez | Honda |
| Third | (Spain) Jorge Lorenzo | Yamaha |

Moto2
Pole position
| Rider | (France) Johann Zarco | Kalex |
| Time | 1:36.346 | |
Fastest lap
| Rider | (Spain) Tito Rabat | Kalex |
| Time | 1:37.449 on lap 6 | |
Podium
| First | (France) Johann Zarco | Kalex |
| Second | (Spain) Tito Rabat | Kalex |
| Third | (United Kingdom) Sam Lowes | Speed Up |

Moto3
Pole position
| Rider | (Italy) Enea Bastianini | Honda |
| Time | 1:41.283 | |
Fastest lap
| Rider | (Spain) Jorge Navarro | Honda |
| Time | 1:42.135 on lap 16 | |
Podium
| First | (Portugal) Miguel Oliveira | KTM |
| Second | (France) Fabio Quartararo | Honda |
| Third | (United Kingdom) Danny Kent | Honda |

The 2015 Dutch TT was the eighth round of the 2015 Grand Prix motorcycle racing season. It was held at the TT Circuit Assen in Assen on 27 June 2015.

In the premier class, Valentino Rossi took his first pole position since the 2014 Valencian Grand Prix. In the race, Rossi fought hard with Marc Márquez; on the final lap, the two riders made contact at the final chicane, causing Rossi to go across the gravel trap. He was able to rejoin the track and claimed his third victory of the season, and a record seventh premier class victory at Assen. Rossi finished ahead of Márquez, while teammate Jorge Lorenzo completed the podium; Rossi extended his championship lead to 10 points as a result. Suzuki's Aleix Espargaró qualified second on the grid, but he dropped to ninth place in the race. Five riders retired from the race – Jack Miller collided with Héctor Barberá, while Stefan Bradl, Eugene Laverty and Alex de Angelis all crashed out.

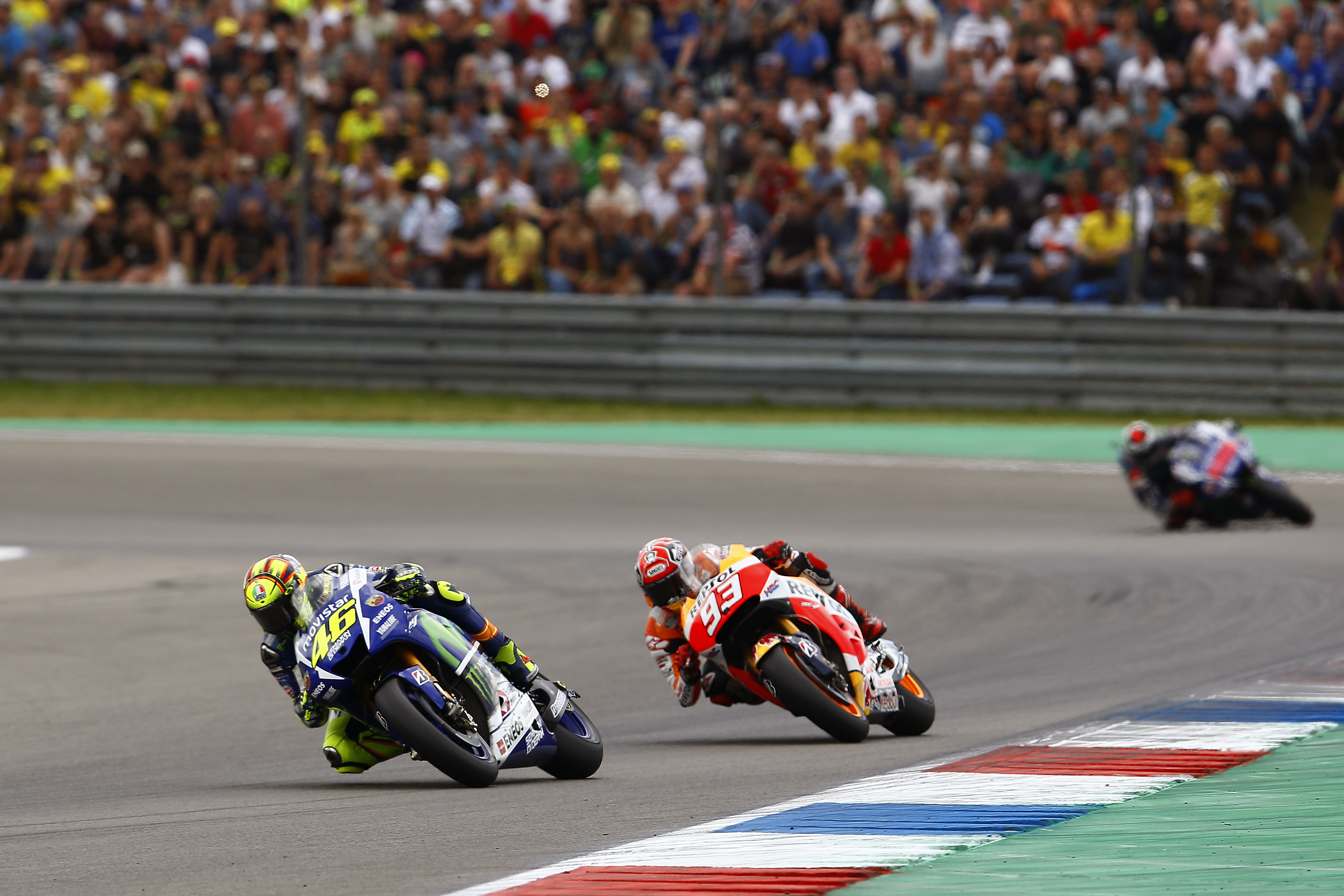
Valentino Rossi, overtaking Marc Márquez during the race, with Jorge Lorenzo in the back. Rossi went on to win the race, Márquez and Lorenzo finishing second and third at the MotoGP race.

== Classification ==
=== MotoGP ===
| Pos. | No. | Rider | Team | Manufacturer | Laps | Time/Retired | Grid | Points |
|---|---|---|---|---|---|---|---|---|
| 1 | 46 | (Italy) Valentino Rossi | Movistar Yamaha MotoGP | Yamaha | 26 | 40:54.037 | 1 | 25 |
| 2 | 93 | (Spain) Marc Márquez | Repsol Honda Team | Honda | 26 | +1.242 | 3 | 20 |
| 3 | 99 | (Spain) Jorge Lorenzo | Movistar Yamaha MotoGP | Yamaha | 26 | +14.576 | 8 | 16 |
| 4 | 29 | (Italy) Andrea Iannone | Ducati Team | Ducati | 26 | +19.109 | 6 | 13 |
| 5 | 44 | (Spain) Pol Espargaró | Monster Yamaha Tech 3 | Yamaha | 26 | +24.268 | 5 | 11 |
| 6 | 35 | (United Kingdom) Cal Crutchlow | CWM LCR Honda | Honda | 26 | +24.373 | 7 | 10 |
| 7 | 38 | (United Kingdom) Bradley Smith | Monster Yamaha Tech 3 | Yamaha | 26 | +24.442 | 12 | 9 |
| 8 | 26 | (Spain) Dani Pedrosa | Repsol Honda Team | Honda | 26 | +24.656 | 4 | 8 |
| 9 | 41 | (Spain) Aleix Espargaró | Team Suzuki Ecstar | Suzuki | 26 | +26.725 | 2 | 7 |
| 10 | 25 | (Spain) Maverick Viñales | Team Suzuki Ecstar | Suzuki | 26 | +27.238 | 9 | 6 |
| 11 | 9 | (Italy) Danilo Petrucci | Octo Pramac Racing | Ducati | 26 | +29.038 | 11 | 5 |
| 12 | 4 | (Italy) Andrea Dovizioso | Ducati Team | Ducati | 26 | +29.418 | 10 | 4 |
| 13 | 45 | (United Kingdom) Scott Redding | EG 0,0 Marc VDS | Honda | 26 | +46.663 | 16 | 3 |
| 14 | 68 | (Colombia) Yonny Hernández | Octo Pramac Racing | Ducati | 26 | +49.305 | 14 | 2 |
| 15 | 76 | (France) Loris Baz | Athinà Forward Racing | Yamaha Forward | 26 | +52.396 | 15 | 1 |
| 16 | 69 | (United States) Nicky Hayden | Aspar MotoGP Team | Honda | 26 | +56.005 | 22 | |
| 17 | 19 | (Spain) Álvaro Bautista | Aprilia Racing Team Gresini | Aprilia | 26 | +59.857 | 21 | |
| 18 | 63 | (France) Mike Di Meglio | Avintia Racing | Ducati | 26 | +1:14.513 | 18 | |
| 19 | 33 | (Italy) Marco Melandri | Aprilia Racing Team Gresini | Aprilia | 25 | +1 lap | 24 | |
| Ret | 15 | (San Marino) Alex de Angelis | E-Motion IodaRacing Team | ART | 23 | Accident | 23 | |
| Ret | 50 | (Republic of Ireland) Eugene Laverty | Aspar MotoGP Team | Honda | 15 | Accident | 19 | |
| Ret | 6 | (Germany) Stefan Bradl | Athinà Forward Racing | Yamaha Forward | 5 | Accident | 13 | |
| Ret | 8 | (Spain) Héctor Barberá | Avintia Racing | Ducati | 0 | Accident | 17 | |
| Ret | 43 | (Australia) Jack Miller | CWM LCR Honda | Honda | 0 | Accident | 20 | |

=== Moto2 ===
The first attempt to run the race was interrupted following an oil spill at the first turn caused by Luis Salom's crashed bike. For the restart, the race distance was reduced from 24 to 16 laps.

| Pos. | No. | Rider | Manufacturer | Laps | Time/Retired | Grid | Points |
|---|---|---|---|---|---|---|---|
| 1 | 5 | (France) Johann Zarco | Kalex | 16 | 26:13.410 | 1 | 25 |
| 2 | 1 | (Spain) Tito Rabat | Kalex | 16 | +0.757 | 2 | 20 |
| 3 | 22 | (United Kingdom) Sam Lowes | Speed Up | 16 | +2.080 | 3 | 16 |
| 4 | 40 | (Spain) Álex Rins | Kalex | 16 | +3.738 | 7 | 13 |
| 5 | 12 | (Switzerland) Thomas Lüthi | Kalex | 16 | +4.530 | 8 | 11 |
| 6 | 19 | (Belgium) Xavier Siméon | Kalex | 16 | +5.045 | 6 | 10 |
| 7 | 94 | (Germany) Jonas Folger | Kalex | 16 | +6.140 | 5 | 9 |
| 8 | 36 | (Finland) Mika Kallio | Kalex | 16 | +8.105 | 15 | 8 |
| 9 | 73 | (Spain) Álex Márquez | Kalex | 16 | +8.376 | 13 | 7 |
| 10 | 3 | (Italy) Simone Corsi | Kalex | 16 | +9.670 | 4 | 6 |
| 11 | 60 | (Spain) Julián Simón | Speed Up | 16 | +11.749 | 12 | 5 |
| 12 | 77 | (Switzerland) Dominique Aegerter | Kalex | 16 | +17.537 | 16 | 4 |
| 13 | 30 | (Japan) Takaaki Nakagami | Kalex | 16 | +18.104 | 10 | 3 |
| 14 | 4 | (Switzerland) Randy Krummenacher | Kalex | 16 | +20.468 | 18 | 2 |
| 15 | 55 | (Malaysia) Hafizh Syahrin | Kalex | 16 | +20.894 | 19 | 1 |
| 16 | 25 | (Malaysia) Azlan Shah | Kalex | 16 | +22.405 | 24 | |
| 17 | 11 | (Germany) Sandro Cortese | Kalex | 16 | +22.930 | 14 | |
| 18 | 23 | (Germany) Marcel Schrötter | Tech 3 | 16 | +25.663 | 17 | |
| 19 | 21 | (Italy) Franco Morbidelli | Kalex | 16 | +30.931 | 32 | |
| 20 | 70 | (Switzerland) Robin Mulhauser | Kalex | 16 | +35.014 | 26 | |
| 21 | 2 | (Switzerland) Jesko Raffin | Kalex | 16 | +35.289 | 29 | |
| 22 | 49 | (Spain) Axel Pons | Kalex | 16 | +44.794 | 11 | |
| 23 | 10 | (Thailand) Thitipong Warokorn | Kalex | 16 | +47.633 | 30 | |
| 24 | 15 | (Thailand) Ratthapark Wilairot | Suter | 16 | +54.049 | 27 | |
| 25 | 13 | (Netherlands) Jasper Iwema | Speed Up | 16 | +1:10.079 | 31 | |
| Ret | 7 | (Italy) Lorenzo Baldassarri | Kalex | 11 | Accident | 9 | |
| Ret | 95 | (Australia) Anthony West | Speed Up | 11 | Accident | 23 | |
| Ret | 96 | (France) Louis Rossi | Tech 3 | 9 | Accident | 25 | |
| Ret | 88 | (Spain) Ricard Cardús | Tech 3 | 5 | Accident | 22 | |
| Ret | 66 | (Germany) Florian Alt | Suter | 0 | Accident | 28 | |
| DNS | 39 | (Spain) Luis Salom | Kalex | 0 | Did not restart | 21 | |
OFFICIAL MOTO2 REPORT

=== Moto3 ===
| Pos. | No. | Rider | Manufacturer | Laps | Time/Retired | Grid | Points |
|---|---|---|---|---|---|---|---|
| 1 | 44 | (Portugal) Miguel Oliveira | KTM | 22 | 37:54.427 | 6 | 25 |
| 2 | 20 | (France) Fabio Quartararo | Honda | 22 | +0.066 | 7 | 20 |
| 3 | 52 | (United Kingdom) Danny Kent | Honda | 22 | +0.117 | 4 | 16 |
| 4 | 9 | (Spain) Jorge Navarro | Honda | 22 | +0.179 | 2 | 13 |
| 5 | 5 | (Italy) Romano Fenati | KTM | 22 | +0.252 | 8 | 11 |
| 6 | 33 | (Italy) Enea Bastianini | Honda | 22 | +0.526 | 1 | 10 |
| 7 | 41 | (South Africa) Brad Binder | KTM | 22 | +0.540 | 11 | 9 |
| 8 | 98 | (Czech Republic) Karel Hanika | KTM | 22 | +21.406 | 3 | 8 |
| 9 | 23 | (Italy) Niccolò Antonelli | Honda | 22 | +21.472 | 19 | 7 |
| 10 | 17 | (United Kingdom) John McPhee | Honda | 22 | +21.663 | 23 | 6 |
| 11 | 21 | (Italy) Francesco Bagnaia | Mahindra | 22 | +21.693 | 10 | 5 |
| 12 | 16 | (Italy) Andrea Migno | KTM | 22 | +21.723 | 17 | 4 |
| 13 | 11 | (Belgium) Livio Loi | Honda | 22 | +22.024 | 20 | 3 |
| 14 | 76 | (Japan) Hiroki Ono | Honda | 22 | +22.204 | 22 | 2 |
| 15 | 65 | (Germany) Philipp Öttl | KTM | 22 | +22.596 | 12 | 1 |
| 16 | 95 | (France) Jules Danilo | Honda | 22 | +22.666 | 28 | |
| 17 | 31 | (Finland) Niklas Ajo | KTM | 22 | +25.494 | 16 | |
| 18 | 88 | (Spain) Jorge Martín | Mahindra | 22 | +27.271 | 15 | |
| 19 | 40 | (South Africa) Darryn Binder | Mahindra | 22 | +27.386 | 24 | |
| 20 | 84 | (Czech Republic) Jakub Kornfeil | KTM | 22 | +33.963 | 25 | |
| 21 | 19 | (Italy) Alessandro Tonucci | Mahindra | 22 | +34.768 | 26 | |
| 22 | 29 | (Italy) Stefano Manzi | Mahindra | 22 | +38.741 | 32 | |
| 23 | 22 | (Spain) Ana Carrasco | KTM | 22 | +51.803 | 33 | |
| 24 | 12 | (Italy) Matteo Ferrari | Mahindra | 22 | +52.214 | 34 | |
| 25 | 91 | (Argentina) Gabriel Rodrigo | KTM | 22 | +53.616 | 27 | |
| 26 | 2 | (Australia) Remy Gardner | Mahindra | 22 | +1:38.917 | 31 | |
| 27 | 25 | (Netherlands) Jorel Boerboom | Kalex KTM | 21 | +1 lap | 35 | |
| 28 | 86 | (Germany) Kevin Hanus | Honda | 21 | +1 lap | 36 | |
| Ret | 55 | (Italy) Andrea Locatelli | Honda | 21 | Accident | 14 | |
| Ret | 6 | (Spain) María Herrera | Husqvarna | 12 | Accident | 13 | |
| Ret | 58 | (Spain) Juan Francisco Guevara | Mahindra | 12 | Retirement | 18 | |
| Ret | 32 | (Spain) Isaac Viñales | Husqvarna | 11 | Accident | 5 | |
| Ret | 63 | (Malaysia) Zulfahmi Khairuddin | KTM | 5 | Accident | 30 | |
| Ret | 10 | (France) Alexis Masbou | Honda | 5 | Retirement | 21 | |
| Ret | 7 | (Spain) Efrén Vázquez | Honda | 2 | Accident | 9 | |
| Ret | 24 | (Japan) Tatsuki Suzuki | Mahindra | 0 | Retirement | 29 | |
OFFICIAL MOTO3 REPORT

== Championship standings after the race (MotoGP) ==
Below are the standings for the top five riders and constructors after round eight has concluded.

Riders' Championship standings

| Pos. | Rider | Points |
|---|---|---|
| 1 | (Italy) Valentino Rossi | 163 |
| 2 | (Spain) Jorge Lorenzo | 153 |
| 3 | (Italy) Andrea Iannone | 107 |
| 4 | (Spain) Marc Márquez | 89 |
| 5 | (Italy) Andrea Dovizioso | 87 |

Constructors' Championship standings

| Pos. | Constructor | Points |
|---|---|---|
| 1 | (Japan) Yamaha | 191 |
| 2 | (Japan) Honda | 134 |
| 3 | (Italy) Ducati | 132 |
| 4 | (Japan) Suzuki | 64 |
| 5 | (Switzerland) Yamaha Forward | 19 |

Teams' Championship standings

| Pos. | Team | Points |
|---|---|---|
| 1 | (Japan) Movistar Yamaha MotoGP | 316 |
| 2 | (Italy) Ducati Team | 194 |
| 3 | (Japan) Repsol Honda Team | 141 |
| 4 | (France) Monster Yamaha Tech 3 | 133 |
| 5 | (Japan) Team Suzuki Ecstar | 90 |

- Note: Only the top five positions are included for all standings.

| Previous race: 2015 Catalan Grand Prix | FIM Grand Prix World Championship; 2015 season | Next race: 2015 German Grand Prix |
| Previous race: 2014 Dutch TT | Dutch TT | Next race: 2016 Dutch TT |
