= Scott Redding =

British motorcycle racer (born 1993)

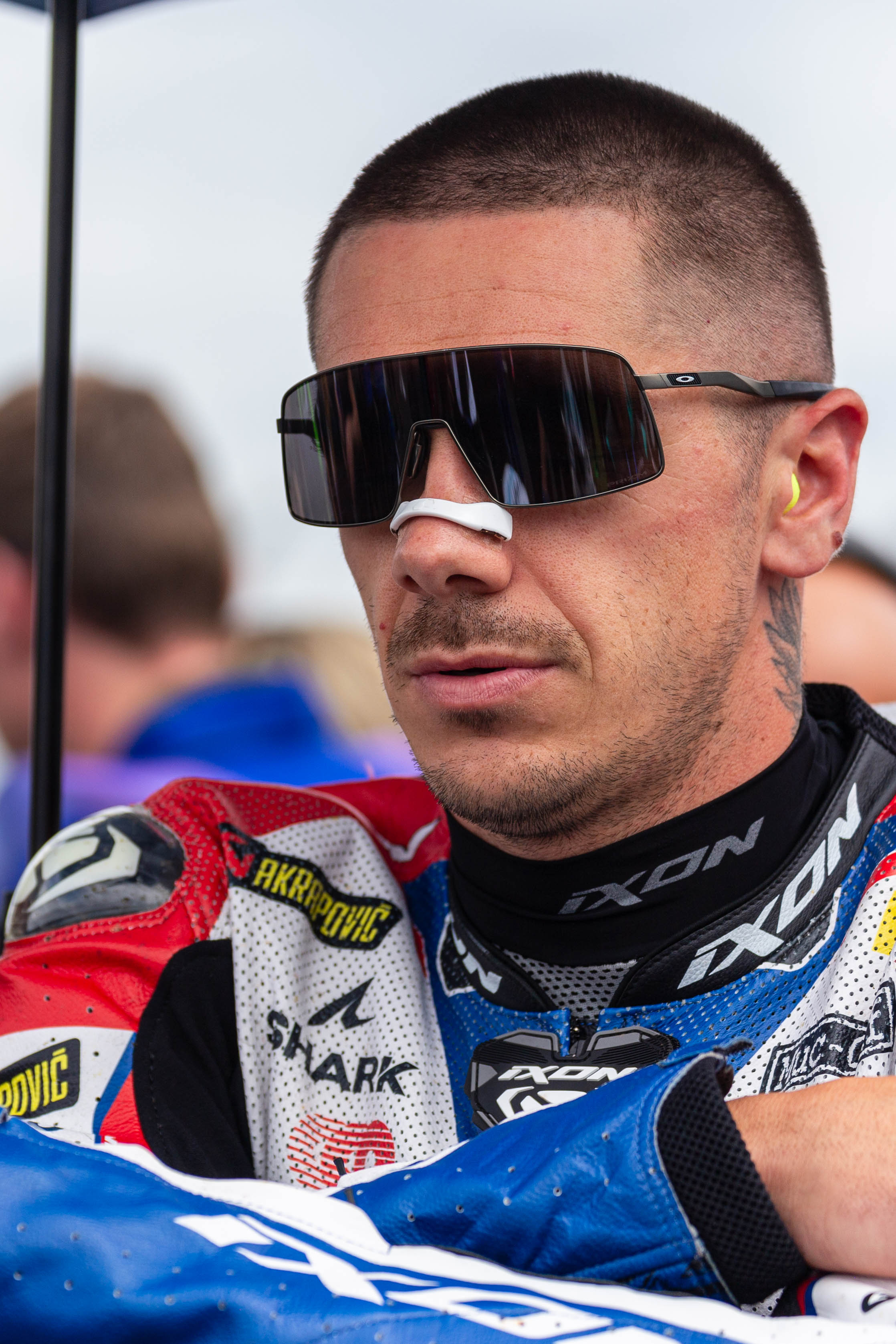
- Scott Redding, Donington World Superbike 2024
- Nationality: British
- Born: 4 January 1993 (age 33); Quedgeley, Gloucestershire, England
- Current team: Hager PBM Ducati
- Bike number: 45
- Website: scottredding45.com/
Motorcycle racing career statistics
MotoGP World Championship
Active years	2014–2018
Manufacturers	Honda (2014–2015); Ducati (2016–2017); Aprilia (2018)
Championships	0
2018 championship position	21st (20 pts)
Starts / Wins / Podiums / Poles / F. laps / Points; 90 / 0 / 2 / 0 / 1 / 323
Moto2 World Championship
Active years	2010–2013
Manufacturers	Suter (2010–2011); Kalex (2012–2013)
Championships	0
2013 championship position	2nd (225 pts)
Starts / Wins / Podiums / Poles / F. laps / Points; 66 / 3 / 14 / 3 / 2 / 555
125cc World Championship
Active years	2008–2009
Manufacturers	Aprilia
Championships	0
2009 championship position	15th (50.5 pts)
Starts / Wins / Podiums / Poles / F. laps / Points; 33 / 1 / 2 / 0 / 2 / 155.5
Superbike World Championship
Active years	2020–2025
Manufacturers	Ducati (2020–2021, 2025); BMW (2022–2024)
Championships	0
2025 championship position	17th (76 pts)
Starts / Wins / Podiums / Poles / F. laps / Points; 190 / 12 / 40 / 2 / 12 / 1319
British Superbike Championship
Active years	2019, 2025–
Manufacturers	Ducati
Championships	1 (2019)
2025 championship position	4th (329.5 pts)
Starts / Wins / Podiums / Poles / F. laps / Points; 85 / 22 / 44 / 15 / 17 / 1576.5

Scott Christopher Redding (born 4 January 1993) is a British motorcycle racer who rides for Hager PBM Ducati in the British Superbike Championship. He is also known from Grand Prix motorcycle racing, having been part of the MotoGP premier class from 2014 to 2018. Redding formerly held the record of youngest rider in Grand Prix motorcycle racing to win a race, when he claimed victory in 125cc at the 2008 British motorcycle Grand Prix, aged just 15 years, and 170 days. He broke Marco Melandri's ten-year record, and Can Öncü broke Redding's record also exactly ten years later, in 2018.

In 2019, Redding competed in the British Superbike Championship riding a Ducati Panigale V4 for Paul Bird's PBM team, winning the championship on his first attempt. He then spent the 2020 and 2021 seasons in the Superbike World Championship with the Ducati Corse team, riding a Panigale V4.

== Career ==
=== Early career ===
Born in Quedgeley, Gloucester, Redding started racing Mini Motos in 2001, winning the 2004 FAB-Racing Metrakit 50cc British MiniGP championship and then switching to the 80cc Metrakit "Calypso Cup" in 2005 in Spain, where he won all six rounds of the series.

In 2006, Redding tested for the Red Bull sponsored MotoGP academy cup and was immediately offered a ride. However, he had a mixed season with only one podium finish at the last round in Jerez.

For 2007, Redding signed for team BLU:sens Aprilia riding in the Spanish CEV 125cc championship finishing second overall to Stefan Bradl with a difference of eight points, taking a second place at round four and winning at the final rounds of five, six and seven.

=== 125cc World Championship (2008–2009) ===
Redding left the CEV championship in 2008, being entered by team BLU:sens Aprilia in the 125cc Grand Prix World championship. Redding made a sensational start at the opening round of Qatar, by being the youngest ever rider in the 125cc class to qualify on the front row of the grid, in fourth place. He went on to take fifth place in the race setting the lap record for the 125cc class of 2'05.635 in the process. He was also on the front row in Spain.

On 22 June 2008, Redding became the back then youngest ever Grand Prix winner, aged 15 years and 170 days, when he won the 2008 British 125cc Grand Prix at Donington Park. Redding took the lead with six laps remaining after pressuring Andrea Iannone into pushing too hard and going off at Craner Curves. Redding held off Frenchman Mike Di Meglio and Spaniard Marc Márquez to win in only his eighth 125cc outing. He became the first British winner of a 125cc race since Chas Mortimer won the 1975 Spanish Grand Prix and the first British winner of a British motorcycle Grand Prix in the 125cc class since 1973, when Tommy Robb won at the 1973 Isle of Man TT, which was then the British round of the world championship. He is also the first British rider ever to win a British round of any Grand Prix class since the British motorcycle Grand Prix moved to Donington Park in 1987. In the first ever two-wheeled race at the famous Indianapolis Motor Speedway in America, Redding secured fourth place, having been in that position when it started to rain due to Hurricane Ike and Red Flag brought the race to a premature end.

Redding also won Rookie of the Year for being the highest placed new rider, finishing the season in eleventh overall.

For the 2009 125cc Motorcycle Grand Prix season, Redding rode a factory Aprilia machinery and remained with team BLU:sens Aprilia.

Redding had a difficult season, suffering from mechanical issues and handling difficulties. He got on the podium at the 2009 British Grand Prix, his second career podium.

=== Moto2 World Championship (2010–2013) ===
==== Marc VDS Racing Team (2010–2013) ====
===== 2010 =====
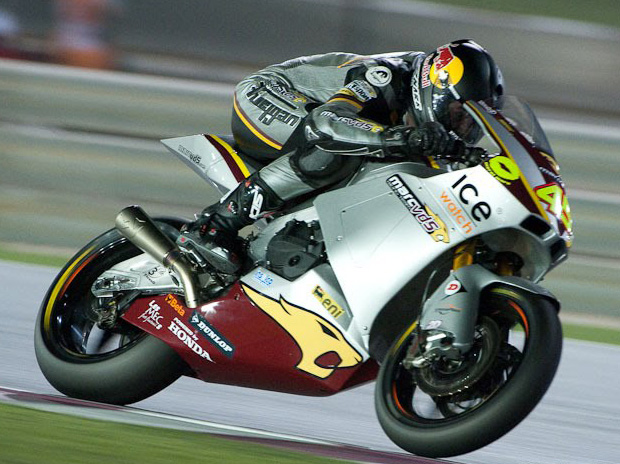
Redding at the 2010 Qatar Grand Prix

Redding signed with new team Marc VDS Racing Team in the Moto2 600cc class for 2010, having grown too big to continue competing in the 125cc class. He struggled in the initial pre-season tests, but was more competitive in later ones. Redding struggled at the beginning of the season, but improved to finish fourth in the British Grand Prix at Silverstone and became the youngest rider ever to score a podium finish in the 250cc/Moto2 class by finishing third in Indianapolis.

At the San Marino Grand Prix in Misano, Redding was involved in an accident which resulted in the death of Japanese rider Shoya Tomizawa. After Tomizawa fell from his bike on the twelfth lap of the race, he was immediately hit by Redding and Alex de Angelis, who were unable to avoid him. Redding received ten stitches for a back laceration but escaped major injury.

On 29 September 2010, Redding signed a two-year contract with Marc VDS, keeping him in Moto2 until 2012.

===== 2011 =====
Redding finished the season in 15th place with 63 points, with a best result of fifth place, obtained on three occasions: at Silverstone, Indianapolis and Misano.

===== 2012 =====
Redding finished the season in fifth position, having collected 165 points, a second place in the 2012 British motorcycle Grand Prix, his home race, along with four other podiums, all third places finishes.

===== 2013 =====
Riding again for Marc VDS, Redding finished a close second in the championship after a season-long battle against Pol Espargaró. During the season, Redding obtained three victories, three second places, a third place, and three pole-positions. With three races left in the season he held a lead of ten points over Espargaró; however, Redding crashed during qualifying in Australia, fracturing his wrist and could not participate in the race. Pol Espargaró won the race. In the following Japanese Grand Prix, Redding collided with the motorcycle of Esteve Rabat who had crashed in front of him in the second turn of the race. The race was red-flagged and restarted without an injured Redding; this second incident took him out of contention for the title, which Espargaró won by winning the Japanese race too.

=== MotoGP World Championship (2014–2018) ===
==== GO&FUN Gresini Honda (2014) ====
===== 2014 =====
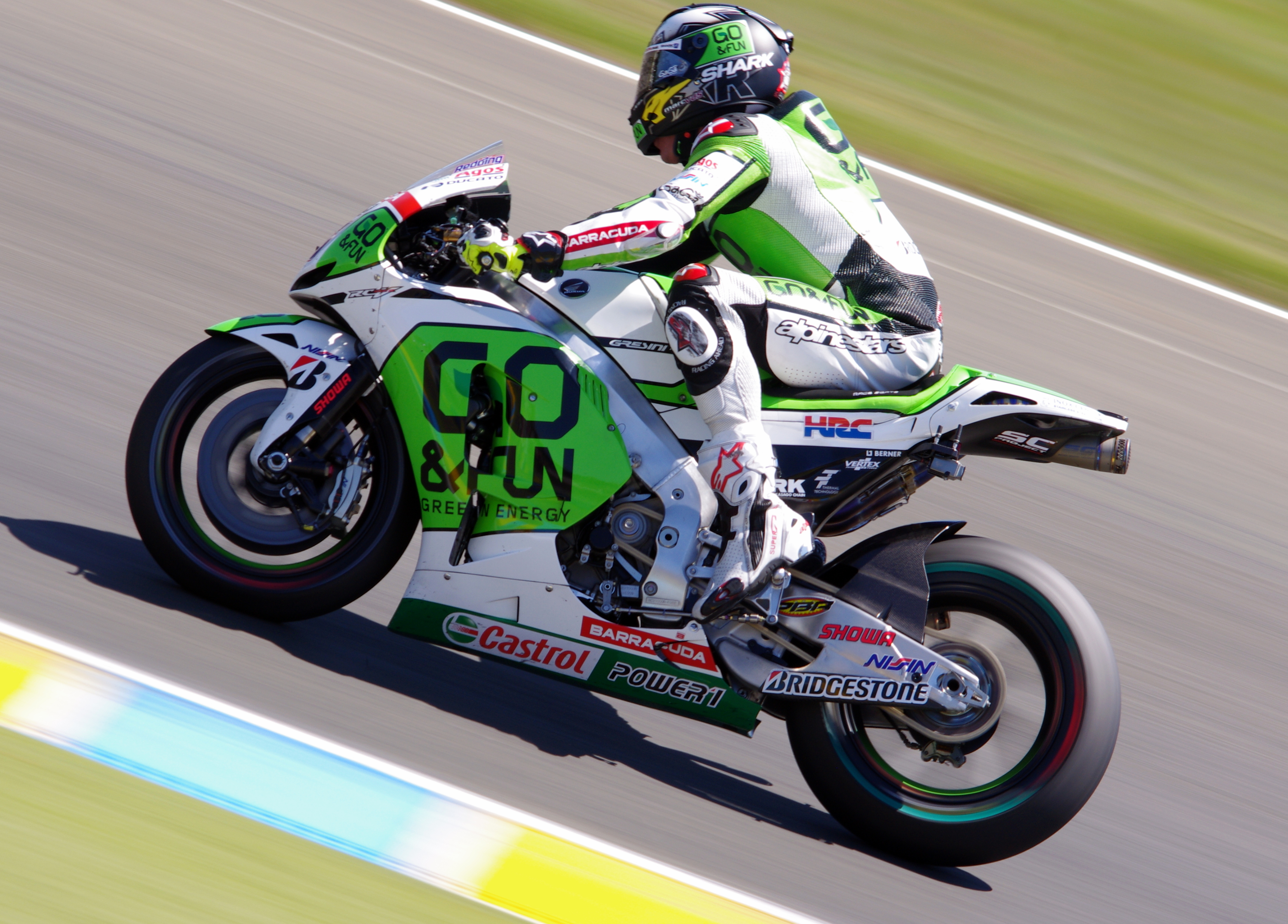
Redding at the 2014 French Grand Prix

Redding switched to MotoGP with the GO & FUN Gresini team on a Honda RCV1000R production racer, his teammate was Álvaro Bautista. He was consistent over the year, finishing every race except Austin. His best results of the season were two seventh-place finishes, at the season-opening round in Qatar and at Phillip Island. He finished 12th in the championship, scoring 81 points. He was also runner-up in the "open class" category, albeit 45 points behind Aleix Espargaró.

==== EG 0,0 Marc VDS (2015) ====
===== 2015 =====
In 2015, Redding remained in MotoGP, re-joining his former team Marc VDS. He was riding a factory-specification Honda RC213V. At the San Marino Grand Prix, Redding achieved his maiden MotoGP podium with a third-place finish despite crashing early in the race. With Bradley Smith finishing second, the duo became the first pair of British riders to finish on a premier class podium since Barry Sheene and Tom Herron did so at the Venezuelan Grand Prix in 1979. On 30 August 2015, the morning of his home race at Silverstone, it was announced that Redding would join Pramac Racing for the 2016 season, replacing Yonny Hernández alongside Danilo Petrucci.

==== Pramac Racing (2016–2017) ====
===== 2016 =====
Redding remained in MotoGP for his third season, this time racing for Pramac Racing, his third team in three seasons. Riding on a Ducati Desmosedici GP15, with teammate Danilo Petrucci, Scott Redding had a mixed season. He only finished 15th in the standings, one point behind Petrucci, but he managed to get his second, and to date his last, MotoGP podium at the 2016 Dutch TT.

===== 2017 =====
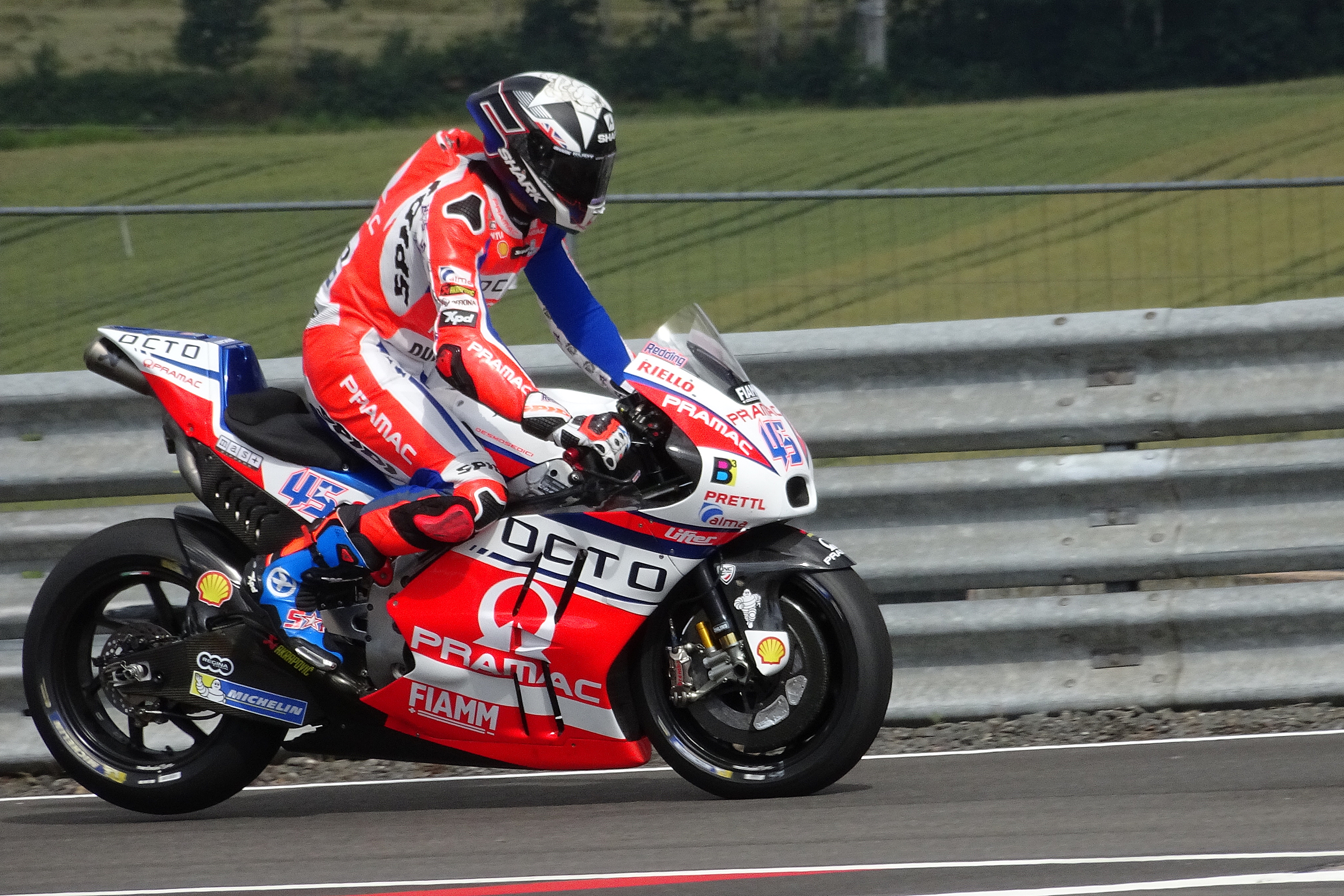
Redding at the 2017 German Grand Prix

In 2017, Redding stayed with Pramac Racing Ducati, together with Danilo Petrucci. However, due to last years performances, Danilo Petrucci received a GP17 Ducati Desmosedici with factory support while Redding had to do with the GP16. During this year, Petrucci emerged as the far stronger rider with Redding never finishing higher than seventh in both Qatar and San Marino. In turn, this would be his last year with Pramac Racing.

==== Aprilia Racing Team Gresini (2018) ====
===== 2018 =====
After his contract at Ducati was not extended, Redding signed with Aprilia for the 2018 season. He replaced fellow British rider Sam Lowes, who had a catastrophic 2017 season, finishing with just five points, compared to teammate Aleix Espargaró's 62. The 2018 season did not go as planned for Aprilia however, Espargaró finished with 44 points, and a best result of sixth in Aragon, while Redding finished with 20 points, and not having a top-ten finish all year. Following the season, Redding was not re-signed by the team.

=== After MotoGP ===
==== British Superbike Championship (2019) ====
===== 2019 =====
In 2019, Redding competed in the British Superbike Championship riding a Ducati Panigale V4 for Paul Bird's PBM team. He won the championship on his first attempt, after an epic showdown with his teammate Josh Brookes, Redding edging him out by a mere five points, over a 27 race season.

==== Superbike World Championship (2020–2025) ====
===== 2020 =====
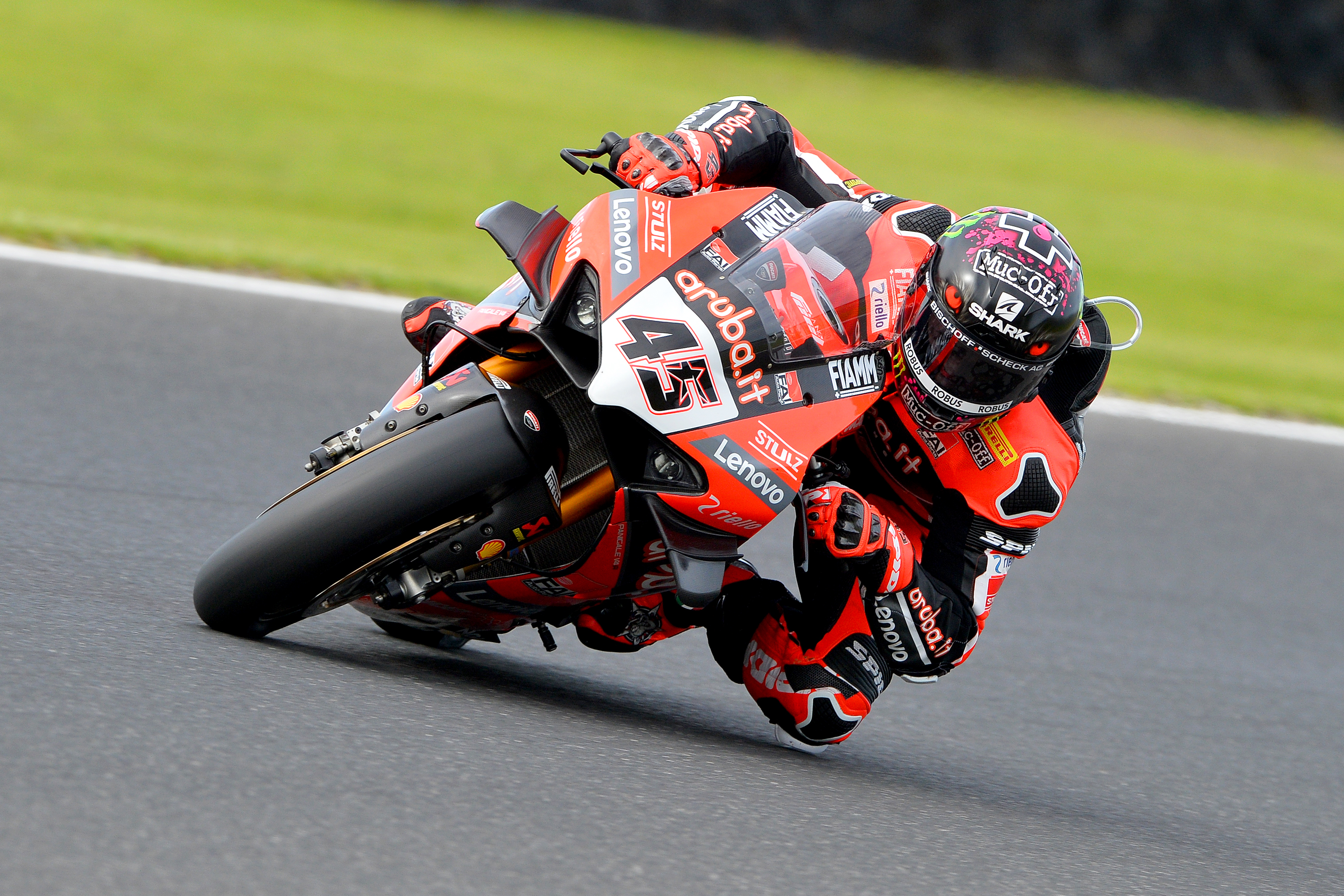
Redding at Phillip Island in 2020

For 2020, Redding competed in the Superbike World Championship, signing a two-year deal to ride a factory Ducati Panigale V4 for the Aruba.it Racing team. He had a successful first season, finishing on the podium 13 times in 24 races (five times first, five times second, three times in third place), and finished second overall in the standings.

===== 2021 =====
As of late season 2021, Redding already has six victories, nine second-place finishes, four third-place finishes, and is third in the standings currently. In August, he and BMW announced that Redding would switch from Ducati to BMW for 2022, a move that surprised many people.

==== BMW Motorrad Team (2022–2023) ====
===== 2022 =====
In the 2022 season, Redding struggled to fit with the BMW S1000RR bike and scored only three podiums and finished eighth in the Championship.

===== 2023 =====
In the 2023 season, Redding didn't earn any podiums and finished 14th in the championship.

After 2023 season, Redding still rode the BMW S1000RR bike but did not renew his contract with BMW and moved to satellite team MGM Bonovo Team.

==== MGM Bonovo (2024–2025) ====
===== 2024 =====
The 2024 season was considered a worse season for Redding as he still struggled with BMW bike and finished 18th in the Championship.

===== 2025 =====
Coming 2025 season, MGM Bonovo and Redding used a Ducati bike with hope to regain form. However, after Donington Park round, Redding made the decision to leave the team and return to British Superbike Championship, to the surprise of the MGM Bonovo boss and staff. He was replaced by Tarran Mackenzie.

The reason for Redding's departure from the team is reported to be financial problems within the team and Redding having to self-fund his place in WorldSBK.

==== Return to British Superbike Championship (2025–present) ====
===== 2025 =====
Redding signed a contract with Hager PBM Ducati to replace Glenn Irwin, who parted ways with team by mutual consent following a disagreement over his return to racing after an injury sustained at Snetterton in June. After a mixed debut at Knockhill, Redding secured a win at Brands Hatch during Round 5 and has since won six more times.

===== 2026 =====
Redding is set to remain with Hager PBM Ducati for the 2026 British Superbike Championship.

== Career statistics ==
=== Grand Prix motorcycle racing ===
==== By season ====
Season	Class	Motorcycle	Team	Number	Race	Win	Podium	Pole	FLap	Pts	Plcd
2008	125cc	Aprilia	Blusens Aprilia Junior	45	17	1	1	0	2	105	11th
2009	125cc	Aprilia	Blusens Aprilia	45	16	0	1	0	0	50.5	15th
2010	Moto2	Suter	Marc VDS Racing Team	45	17	0	2	0	1	102	8th
2011	Moto2	Suter	Marc VDS Racing Team	45	17	0	0	0	0	63	15th
2012	Moto2	Kalex	Marc VDS Racing Team	45	17	0	5	0	0	165	5th
2013	Moto2	Kalex	Marc VDS Racing Team	45	15	3	7	3	1	225	**2nd**
2014	MotoGP	Honda	GO&FUN Gresini Honda	45	18	0	0	0	0	81	12th
2015	MotoGP	Honda	EG 0,0 Marc VDS	45	18	0	1	0	0	84	13th
2016	MotoGP	Ducati	Octo Pramac Yakhnich	45	18	0	1	0	0	74	15th
2017	MotoGP	Ducati	Octo Pramac Racing	45	18	0	0	0	1	64	14th
2018	MotoGP	Aprilia	Aprilia Racing Team Gresini	45	18	0	0	0	0	20	21st
Total					**189**	**4**	**18**	**3**	**5**	**1033.5**	

==== By class ====
Class	Seasons	1st GP	1st pod	1st win	Race	Win	Podiums	Pole	FLap	Pts	WChmp
125cc	2008–2009	2008 Qatar	2008 Great Britain	2008 Great Britain	33	1	2	0	2	155.5	0
Moto2	2010–2013	2010 Qatar	2010 Indianapolis	2013 France	66	3	14	3	2	555	0
MotoGP	2014–2018	2014 Qatar	2015 San Marino		90	0	2	0	1	323	0
Total	2008–2018				**189**	**4**	**18**	**3**	**5**	**1033.5**	

==== Races by year ====
(key) (Races in bold indicate pole position; races in italics indicate fastest lap)

Year	Class	Bike	1	2	3	4	5	6	7	8	9	10	11	12	13	14	15	16	17	18	19	Pos	Pts
2008	125cc	Aprilia	QAT; 5	SPA; 7	POR; 21	CHN; Ret	FRA; Ret	ITA; 14	CAT; 6	GBR; 1	NED; Ret	GER; 8	CZE; 11	RSM; Ret	INP; 4	JPN; 8	AUS; 10	MAL; Ret	VAL; 8			11th	105
2009	125cc	Aprilia	QAT; 13	JPN; Ret	SPA; 4	FRA; Ret	ITA; 7	CAT; 11	NED; Ret	GER; Ret	GBR; 3	CZE; 15	INP; Ret	RSM; Ret	POR; 16	AUS; 11	MAL; Ret	VAL; Ret				15th	50.5
2010	Moto2	Suter	QAT; 23	SPA; 16	FRA; 11	ITA; 21	GBR; 4	NED; 11	CAT; Ret	GER; Ret	CZE; 22	INP; 3	RSM; Ret	ARA; 8	JPN; 5	MAL; Ret	AUS; 2	POR; 4	VAL; 5			8th	102
2011	Moto2	Suter	QAT; 31	SPA; 23	POR; 25	FRA; 16	CAT; 11	GBR; 5	NED; 24	ITA; 27	GER; 7	CZE; 26	INP; 5	RSM; 5	ARA; 15	JPN; 20	AUS; 7	MAL; 10	VAL; 30			15th	63
2012	Moto2	Kalex	QAT; 6	SPA; 4	POR; 11	FRA; 3	CAT; 10	GBR; 2	NED; 3	GER; Ret	ITA; 6	INP; 6	CZE; Ret	RSM; 7	ARA; 3	JPN; 4	MAL; 11	AUS; 3	VAL; 22			5th	165
2013	Moto2	Kalex	QAT; 2	**AME**; 5	SPA; 2	FRA; 1	**ITA**; 1	CAT; 4	NED; 2	GER; 7	**INP**; 3	CZE; 8	GBR; 1	RSM; 6	ARA; 4	MAL; 7	AUS; DNS	JPN; DNS	VAL; 15			2nd	225
2014	MotoGP	Honda	QAT; 7	AME; Ret	ARG; 14	SPA; 13	FRA; 12	ITA; 13	CAT; 13	NED; 12	GER; 11	INP; 9	CZE; 11	GBR; 10	RSM; 13	ARA; 10	JPN; 16	AUS; 7	MAL; 10	VAL; 10		12th	81
2015	MotoGP	Honda	QAT; 13	AME; Ret	ARG; 9	SPA; 13	FRA; Ret	ITA; 11	CAT; 7	NED; 13	GER; Ret	INP; 13	CZE; 12	GBR; 6	RSM; 3	ARA; 12	JPN; 10	AUS; 11	MAL; 11	VAL; 15		13th	84
2016	MotoGP	Ducati	QAT; 10	ARG; Ret	AME; 6	SPA; 19	FRA; Ret	ITA; Ret	CAT; 16	NED; 3	GER; 4	AUT; 8	CZE; 15	GBR; 17	RSM; 15	ARA; 19	JPN; 9	AUS; 7	MAL; 15	VAL; 14		15th	74
2017	MotoGP	Ducati	QAT; 7	ARG; 8	AME; 12	SPA; 11	FRA; Ret	ITA; 12	CAT; 13	NED; Ret	GER; 20	CZE; 16	AUT; 12	GBR; 8	RSM; 7	ARA; 14	JPN; 16	AUS; 11	MAL; 13	VAL; Ret		14th	64
2018	MotoGP	Aprilia	QAT; 20	ARG; 12	AME; 17	SPA; 15	FRA; Ret	ITA; Ret	CAT; 12	NED; 14	GER; 15	CZE; Ret	AUT; 20	GBR; C	RSM; 21	ARA; 16	THA; 16	JPN; 19	AUS; 13	MAL; 19	VAL; 11	21st	20

=== British Superbike Championship ===
==== Races by year ====
(key) (Races in bold indicate pole position; races in italics indicate fastest lap)

Year	Bike	1		2		3			4		5		6		7		8		9			10		11		12			Pos	Pts
Year	Bike	R1	R2	R1	R2	R1	R2	R3	R1	R2	R1	R2	R1	R2	R1	R2	R1	R2	R1	R2	R3	R1	R2	R1	R2	R1	R2	R3	Pos	Pts
2019	Ducati	SIL; 3	SIL; Ret	OUL; 5	OUL; 4	DON; 1	DON; 1	DON; 1	**BRH**; 22	**BRH**; 3	KNO; 2	**KNO**; 1	**SNE**; 1	SNE; 1	**THR**; 2	THR; 22	CAD; 4	CAD; Ret	OUL; 3	OUL; 1	OUL; 3	**ASS**; 1	ASS; 1	**DON**; 1	**DON**; 1	BHGP; 3	BHGP; 2	BHGP; 3	1st	697

Year	Bike	1			2			3			4			5			6			7			8				9			10			11			Pos	Pts
Year	Bike	R1	R2	R3	R1	R2	R3	R1	R2	R3	R1	R2	R3	R1	R2	R3	R1	R2	R3	R1	R2	R3	R1	R2	R3	R4	R1	R2	R3	R1	R2	R3	R1	R2	R3	Pos	Pts
2025	Ducati	OUL	OUL	OUL	DON	DON	DON	SNE	SNE	SNE	KNO; 4	KNO; 19	KNO; 9	BRH; 2	**BRH**; 1	BRH; 3	THR; 11	THR; 7	THR; 8	CAD; 7	CAD; 15	CAD; 8	**DON**; 1	DON; 2	DON; 3	DON; 3	ASS; 1	ASS; 15	ASS; 1	OUL; 21	OUL; 11	OUL; 1	BRH; 1	BRH; 1	BRH; 5	4th	329.5
2026	Ducati	OUL; 5	OUL; 4	OUL; 4	DON; 1	**DON**; 2	DON; 2	KNO; 2	KNO; 3	KNO; 1	SNE; 2	**SNE**; 1	**SNE**; 2	BRH; 2	**BRH**; 2	BRH; 1	OUL; 5	OUL; 3	OUL; 2	THR; 5	THR; 2	THR; Ret	CAD; 4	CAD; 9	CAD; 15		ASS; 1	**ASS**; 1	ASS; 3	DON; 4	DON; 2	DON; 1	BRH; 1	**BRH**; 1	**BRH**; 4	2nd	550

=== Superbike World Championship ===
==== By season ====
Season	Motorcycle	Team	Race	Win	Podium	Pole	FLap	Pts	Plcd
2020	Ducati Panigale V4 R	Aruba.it Racing – Ducati	24	5	14	1	3	305	**2nd**
2021	Ducati Panigale V4 R	Aruba.it Racing – Ducati	37	7	23	1	9	501	**3rd**
2022	BMW M1000RR	BMW Motorrad WorldSBK Team	36	0	3	0	0	204	8th
2023	BMW M1000RR	ROKiT BMW Motorrad WorldSBK Team	36	0	0	0	0	126	14th
2024	BMW M1000RR	Bonovo Action BMW	36	0	0	0	0	107	18th
2025	Ducati Panigale V4 R	MGM Bonovo Racing	21	0	0	0	0	76	17th
Total			**190**	**12**	**40**	**2**	**12**	**1319**	

==== Races by year ====
(key) (Races in bold indicate pole position; races in italics indicate fastest lap)

Year	Bike	1			2			3			4			5			6			7			8			9			10			11			12			13			Pos	Pts
Year	Bike	R1	SR	R2	R1	SR	R2	R1	SR	R2	R1	SR	R2	R1	SR	R2	R1	SR	R2	R1	SR	R2	R1	SR	R2	R1	SR	R2	R1	SR	R2	R1	SR	R2	R1	SR	R2	R1	SR	R2	Pos	Pts
2020	Ducati	AUS; 3	AUS; 3	AUS; 3	**SPA**; 1	**SPA**; 2	SPA; 1	POR; 7	POR; 5	POR; 2	SPA; 1	SPA; 2	SPA; 4	SPA; Ret	SPA; 1	SPA; 3	SPA; 2	SPA; 8	SPA; 6	FRA; 5	FRA; 4	FRA; 1	POR; Ret	POR; 6	POR; 2																2nd	305
2021	Ducati	SPA; 4	SPA; 8	SPA; 1	POR; 1	POR; 3	POR; 16	ITA; 4	ITA; 4	ITA; 4	GBR; Ret	GBR; 18	GBR; 4	NED; 2	NED; 5	NED; 2	CZE; 2	CZE; 2	CZE; 1	SPA; 1	SPA; 1	SPA; 2	FRA; 12	FRA; 5	FRA; 3	SPA; 1	SPA; 15	SPA; 3	SPA; 3	SPA; C	SPA; 2	POR; 2	POR; 2	POR; 2	**ARG**; 9	**ARG**; 2	ARG; 1	INA; 3	INA; C	INA; 2	3rd	501
2022	BMW	SPA; 15	SPA; 12	SPA; Ret	NED; 9	NED; 11	NED; 5	POR; 8	POR; 7	POR; 11	ITA; 10	ITA; 11	ITA; 9	GBR; 4	GBR; 3	GBR; 5	CZE; 3	CZE; 8	CZE; 4	FRA; 2	FRA; 5	FRA; 6	SPA; Ret	SPA; 8	SPA; Ret	POR; 18	POR; 13	POR; 7	ARG; 7	ARG; 14	ARG; 9	INA; 12	INA; 6	INA; 6	AUS; 16	AUS; 6	AUS; 6				8th	204
2023	BMW	AUS; 9	AUS; 14	AUS; 13	INA; Ret	INA; 9	INA; 10	NED; 10	NED; 8	NED; 7	SPA; Ret	SPA; 12	SPA; Ret	EMI; 11	EMI; 11	EMI; 14	GBR; 8	GBR; 9	GBR; 4	ITA; 10	ITA; 9	ITA; 8	CZE; 4	CZE; 11	CZE; 8	FRA; 7	FRA; 20	FRA; Ret	SPA; 11	SPA; 11	SPA; 14	POR; 15	POR; 13	POR; 14	SPA; Ret	SPA; Ret	SPA; 8				14th	126
2024	BMW	AUS; 11	AUS; 17	AUS; 17	SPA; 17	SPA; 12	SPA; 11	NED; 8	NED; 10	NED; Ret	ITA; 15	ITA; 14	ITA; 12	GBR; Ret	GBR; 4	GBR; 4	CZE; 15	CZE; Ret	CZE; 13	POR; Ret	POR; 17	POR; 14	FRA; 4	FRA; 4	FRA; 8	ITA; 13	ITA; 13	ITA; 12	SPA; 11	SPA; 10	SPA; 11	POR; 12	POR; 10	POR; 11	SPA; 14	SPA; 12	SPA; 12				15th	107
2025	Ducati	AUS; 5	AUS; 4	AUS; 4	POR; Ret	POR; 15	POR; 15	NED; 10	NED; 6	NED; 19	ITA; 10	ITA; 11	ITA; 13	CZE; 14	CZE; 14	CZE; 12	EMI; 10	EMI; 13	EMI; 16	GBR; 6	GBR; Ret	GBR; 12	HUN	HUN	HUN	FRA	FRA	FRA	ARA	ARA	ARA	POR	POR	POR	SPA	SPA	SPA				17th	76

Records
Preceded by Marco Melandri; 15 years, 324 days (1998 Dutch TT)	Youngest rider to win a motorcycle Grand Prix; 15 years, 170 days (2008 British motorcycle Grand Prix)	Succeeded by Can Öncü; 15 years, 115 days (2018 Valencian Community motorcycle Grand Prix)
