= 2016 Dutch TT =

(Netherlands) 2016 Dutch TT
Race details
- Race 8 of 18 races in the 2016 Grand Prix motorcycle racing season
- Date: 26 June 2016
- Official name: Motul TT Assen
- Location: TT Circuit Assen
- Course: Permanent racing facility; 4.542 km (2.822 mi)

MotoGP
Pole position
Rider	(Italy) Andrea Dovizioso	Ducati
Time	1:45.246	
Fastest lap
Rider	(Italy) Danilo Petrucci	Ducati
Time	1:48.339 on lap 8 (first part)	
Podium
First	(Australia) Jack Miller	Honda
Second	(Spain) Marc Márquez	Honda
Third	(United Kingdom) Scott Redding	Ducati

Moto2
Pole position
Rider	(Switzerland) Thomas Lüthi	Kalex
Time	1:37.954	
Fastest lap
Rider	(Japan) Takaaki Nakagami	Kalex
Time	1:38.055 on lap 13	
Podium
First	(Japan) Takaaki Nakagami	Kalex
Second	(France) Johann Zarco	Kalex
Third	(Italy) Franco Morbidelli	Kalex

Moto3
Pole position
Rider	(Italy) Enea Bastianini	Honda
Time	1:42.463	
Fastest lap
Rider	(Spain) Arón Canet	Honda
Time	1:42.778 on lap 3	
Podium
First	(Italy) Francesco Bagnaia	Mahindra
Second	(Italy) Fabio Di Giannantonio	Honda
Third	(Italy) Andrea Migno	KTM

The 2016 Dutch TT was the eighth round of the 2016 MotoGP season. It was held at the TT Circuit Assen in Assen on 26 June 2016.

== Race report ==
=== MotoGP ===
It was the first Dutch TT held on Sunday, instead of the traditional Saturday date for the race. Geert Timmer chicane was altered removing the artificial turf and replacing it with higher kerbing. This race marked the first MotoGP class race since the 2006 Portuguese Grand Prix won by a non-factory team and the first race since the 2013 Americas Grand Prix in which all classes won by a new winner. Yamaha's podium streak record was ended for the first time since 2014 Dutch TT. It was also the 250th MotoGP race.

=== Moto2 ===
Nakagami's win in Moto2 was the first for a Japanese rider in any GP class since Yuki Takahashi in the 2010 Catalan Grand Prix.

== Classification ==
=== MotoGP ===
The race, scheduled to be run for 26 laps, was red-flagged after 14 full laps due to heavy rain and was later restarted over 12 laps. The race resulted in Jack Miller winning his maiden premier class victory. In the second part of the race, Valentino Rossi led and was pulling away before crashing out on the back end of the circuit. This in turn allowed Marc Márquez to make major championship gains by acquiring 20 points for finishing second behind Miller. This was a major turning point in the championship as Márquez would go on to claim his third title. Reigning champion Jorge Lorenzo's title defense derailed further following his Barcelona crash, as he struggled in the harsh conditions and ended up in 10th. Lorenzo remained ahead of Rossi in the standings, but slipped further behind Márquez. Scott Redding completed the podium in a rare double-rostrum for privateer teams.

Pos.	No.	Rider	Team	Manufacturer	Laps	Time/Retired	Grid	Points
1	43	(Australia) Jack Miller	Estrella Galicia 0,0 Marc VDS	Honda	12	22:17.447	18	25
2	93	(Spain) Marc Márquez	Repsol Honda Team	Honda	12	+1.991	4	20
3	45	(United Kingdom) Scott Redding	Octo Pramac Yakhnich	Ducati	12	+5.906	3	16
4	44	(Spain) Pol Espargaró	Monster Yamaha Tech 3	Yamaha	12	+9.812	7	13
5	29	(Italy) Andrea Iannone	Ducati Team	Ducati	12	+17.835	21	11
6	8	(Spain) Héctor Barberá	Avintia Racing	Ducati	12	+18.692	12	10
7	50	(Republic of Ireland) Eugene Laverty	Aspar Team MotoGP	Ducati	12	+22.605	16	9
8	6	(Germany) Stefan Bradl	Aprilia Racing Team Gresini	Aprilia	12	+23.603	17	8
9	25	(Spain) Maverick Viñales	Team Suzuki Ecstar	Suzuki	12	+26.148	11	7
10	99	(Spain) Jorge Lorenzo	Movistar Yamaha MotoGP	Yamaha	12	+27.604	10	6
11	53	(Spain) Tito Rabat	Estrella Galicia 0,0 Marc VDS	Honda	12	+1:21.830	19	5
12	26	(Spain) Dani Pedrosa	Repsol Honda Team	Honda	12	+1:54.369	15	4
13	38	(United Kingdom) Bradley Smith	Monster Yamaha Tech 3	Yamaha	9	+3 laps	13	3
Ret	19	(Spain) Álvaro Bautista	Aprilia Racing Team Gresini	Aprilia	11	Accident	14	
Ret	51	(Italy) Michele Pirro	Ducati Team	Ducati	5	Accident	20	
Ret	46	(Italy) Valentino Rossi	Movistar Yamaha MotoGP	Yamaha	2	Accident	2	
Ret	41	(Spain) Aleix Espargaró	Team Suzuki Ecstar	Suzuki	2	Accident	8	
Ret	4	(Italy) Andrea Dovizioso	Ducati Team	Ducati	1	Accident	1	
Ret	9	(Italy) Danilo Petrucci	Octo Pramac Yakhnich	Ducati	1	Electronics	9	
Ret	35	(United Kingdom) Cal Crutchlow	LCR Honda	Honda	0	Accident	5	
Ret	68	(Colombia) Yonny Hernández	Aspar Team MotoGP	Ducati	0	Did not restart	6	

=== Moto2 ===
The race, scheduled to be run for 24 laps, was stopped early due to rain.

Pos.	No.	Rider	Manufacturer	Laps	Time/Retired	Grid	Points
1	30	(Japan) Takaaki Nakagami	Kalex	21	34:33.948	6	25
2	5	(France) Johann Zarco	Kalex	21	+2.435	2	20
3	21	(Italy) Franco Morbidelli	Kalex	21	+5.670	5	16
4	22	(United Kingdom) Sam Lowes	Kalex	21	+7.069	4	13
5	7	(Italy) Lorenzo Baldassarri	Kalex	21	+7.883	10	11
6	40	(Spain) Álex Rins	Kalex	21	+9.215	8	10
7	24	(Italy) Simone Corsi	Speed Up	21	+9.482	16	9
8	73	(Spain) Álex Márquez	Kalex	21	+15.004	13	8
9	77	(Switzerland) Dominique Aegerter	Kalex	21	+15.227	3	7
10	94	(Germany) Jonas Folger	Kalex	21	+15.404	9	6
11	19	(Belgium) Xavier Siméon	Speed Up	21	+16.374	14	5
12	11	(Germany) Sandro Cortese	Kalex	21	+16.567	7	4
13	23	(Germany) Marcel Schrötter	Kalex	21	+24.770	17	3
14	52	(United Kingdom) Danny Kent	Kalex	21	+25.017	18	2
15	44	(Portugal) Miguel Oliveira	Kalex	21	+25.542	11	1
16	60	(Spain) Julián Simón	Speed Up	21	+25.729	15	
17	97	(Spain) Xavi Vierge	Tech 3	21	+34.115	25	
18	2	(Switzerland) Jesko Raffin	Kalex	21	+34.180	23	
19	54	(Italy) Mattia Pasini	Kalex	21	+34.764	12	
20	87	(Australia) Remy Gardner	Kalex	21	+41.438	26	
21	32	(Spain) Isaac Viñales	Tech 3	21	+42.058	24	
22	70	(Switzerland) Robin Mulhauser	Kalex	21	+48.683	22	
23	57	(Spain) Edgar Pons	Kalex	21	+56.096	27	
Ret	12	(Switzerland) Thomas Lüthi	Kalex	18	Accident	1	
Ret	10	(Italy) Luca Marini	Kalex	17	Accident Damage	21	
Ret	55	(Malaysia) Hafizh Syahrin	Kalex	14	Handling	20	
Ret	49	(Spain) Axel Pons	Kalex	4	Accident Damage	19	
OFFICIAL MOTO2 REPORT

=== Moto3 ===
Jorge Martín was replaced by Albert Arenas after the two Friday practice sessions.

Pos.	No.	Rider	Manufacturer	Laps	Time/Retired	Grid	Points
1	21	(Italy) Francesco Bagnaia	Mahindra	22	38:11.535	10	25
2	4	(Italy) Fabio Di Giannantonio	Honda	22	+0.039	9	20
3	16	(Italy) Andrea Migno	KTM	22	+0.018 (Note: 1-position penalty.)	2	16
4	5	(Italy) Romano Fenati	KTM	22	+0.084	4	13
5	23	(Italy) Niccolò Antonelli	Honda	22	+0.136	13	11
6	95	(France) Jules Danilo	Honda	22	+0.161	14	10
7	8	(Italy) Nicolò Bulega	KTM	22	+0.826	3	9
8	36	(Spain) Joan Mir	KTM	22	+0.839	21	8
9	64	(Netherlands) Bo Bendsneyder	KTM	22	+1.023	7	7
10	48	(Italy) Lorenzo Dalla Porta	Honda	22	+1.038	12	6
11	65	(Germany) Philipp Öttl	KTM	22	+1.153	15	5
12	41	(South Africa) Brad Binder	KTM	22	+12.169	5	4
13	84	(Czech Republic) Jakub Kornfeil	Honda	22	+15.641	23	3
14	6	(Spain) María Herrera	KTM	22	+18.518	22	2
15	11	(Belgium) Livio Loi	Honda	22	+18.549	18	1
16	17	(United Kingdom) John McPhee	Peugeot	22	+18.602	20	
17	40	(South Africa) Darryn Binder	Mahindra	22	+36.919	19	
18	43	(Italy) Stefano Valtulini	Mahindra	22	+41.562	27	
19	7	(Malaysia) Adam Norrodin	Honda	22	+41.647	29	
20	77	(Italy) Lorenzo Petrarca	Mahindra	22	+54.639	31	
21	3	(Italy) Fabio Spiranelli	Mahindra	22	+55.295	30	
22	22	(United Kingdom) Danny Webb	Mahindra	22	+1:04.271	32	
Ret	33	(Italy) Enea Bastianini	Honda	18	Accident	1	
Ret	55	(Italy) Andrea Locatelli	KTM	18	Accident	17	
Ret	10	(France) Alexis Masbou	Peugeot	12	Accident	26	
Ret	24	(Japan) Tatsuki Suzuki	Mahindra	12	Accident	24	
Ret	58	(Spain) Juan Francisco Guevara	KTM	7	Accident Damage	6	
Ret	44	(Spain) Arón Canet	Honda	6	Accident	16	
Ret	19	(Argentina) Gabriel Rodrigo	KTM	1	Accident	11	
Ret	20	(France) Fabio Quartararo	KTM	1	Accident	8	
Ret	89	(Malaysia) Khairul Idham Pawi	Honda	1	Accident	28	
Ret	12	(Spain) Albert Arenas	Mahindra	0	Accident	25	
OFFICIAL MOTO3 REPORT

== Championship standings after the race (MotoGP) ==
Below are the standings for the top five riders and constructors after round eight has concluded.

Riders' Championship standings

Pos.	Rider	Points
1	(Spain) Marc Márquez	145
2	(Spain) Jorge Lorenzo	121
3	(Italy) Valentino Rossi	103
4	(Spain) Dani Pedrosa	86
5	(Spain) Maverick Viñales	79

Constructors' Championship standings

Pos.	Constructor	Points
1	(Japan) Yamaha	178
2	(Japan) Honda	160
3	(Italy) Ducati	108
4	(Japan) Suzuki	85
5	(Italy) Aprilia	45

- Note: Only the top five positions are included for both sets of standings.

== Notes ==
Previous race: 2016 Catalan Grand Prix	FIM Grand Prix World Championship; 2016 season	Next race: 2016 German Grand Prix
Previous race: 2015 Dutch TT	Dutch TT	Next race: 2017 Dutch TT
