= 2016 Austrian motorcycle Grand Prix =

(Austria) 2016 Austrian Grand Prix
Race details
- Race 10 of 18 races in the 2016 Grand Prix motorcycle racing season
- Date: 14 August 2016
- Official name: NeroGiardini Motorrad Grand Prix von Österreich
- Location: Red Bull Ring
- Course: Permanent racing facility; 4.318 km (2.683 mi)

MotoGP
Pole position
Rider	(Italy) Andrea Iannone	Ducati
Time	1:23.142	
Fastest lap
Rider	(Italy) Andrea Iannone	Ducati
Time	1:24.561 on lap 24	
Podium
First	(Italy) Andrea Iannone	Ducati
Second	(Italy) Andrea Dovizioso	Ducati
Third	(Spain) Jorge Lorenzo	Yamaha

Moto2
Pole position
Rider	(France) Johann Zarco	Kalex
Time	1:29.255	
Fastest lap
Rider	(France) Johann Zarco	Kalex
Time	1:29.497 on lap 8	
Podium
First	(France) Johann Zarco	Kalex
Second	(Italy) Franco Morbidelli	Kalex
Third	(Spain) Álex Rins	Kalex

Moto3
Pole position
Rider	(Spain) Joan Mir	KTM
Time	1:36.228	
Fastest lap
Rider	(Germany) Philipp Öttl	KTM
Time	1:36.557 on lap 15	
Podium
First	(Spain) Joan Mir	KTM
Second	(South Africa) Brad Binder	KTM
Third	(Italy) Enea Bastianini	Honda

The 2016 Austrian motorcycle Grand Prix was the tenth round of the 2016 MotoGP season. It was held at the Red Bull Ring in Spielberg on 14 August 2016.

== MotoGP race report ==
Andrea Iannone took his first and only victory in MotoGP and the first since Moto2 Italy 2012 and also was the first Ducati rider other than Casey Stoner to win a race since Loris Capirossi's win at the 2007 Japanese Grand Prix. This race marked Ducati's first 1-2 finish since the 2007 Australian Grand Prix and also the first win for a manufacturer other than Honda or Yamaha since the 2010 Australian Grand Prix.

== Classification ==
=== MotoGP ===
Pos.	No.	Rider	Team	Manufacturer	Laps	Time/Retired	Grid	Points
1	29	(Italy) Andrea Iannone	Ducati Team	Ducati	28	39:46.255	1	25
2	4	(Italy) Andrea Dovizioso	Ducati Team	Ducati	28	+0.938	3	20
3	99	(Spain) Jorge Lorenzo	Movistar Yamaha MotoGP	Yamaha	28	+3.389	4	16
4	46	(Italy) Valentino Rossi	Movistar Yamaha MotoGP	Yamaha	28	+3.815	2	13
5	93	(Spain) Marc Márquez	Repsol Honda Team	Honda	28	+11.813	5	11
6	25	(Spain) Maverick Viñales	Team Suzuki Ecstar	Suzuki	28	+14.341	6	10
7	26	(Spain) Dani Pedrosa	Repsol Honda Team	Honda	28	+17.063	12	9
8	45	(United Kingdom) Scott Redding	Octo Pramac Yakhnich	Ducati	28	+29.437	8	8
9	38	(United Kingdom) Bradley Smith	Monster Yamaha Tech 3	Yamaha	28	+29.785	14	7
10	44	(Spain) Pol Espargaró	Monster Yamaha Tech 3	Yamaha	28	+37.094	15	6
11	9	(Italy) Danilo Petrucci	Octo Pramac Yakhnich	Ducati	28	+39.765	13	5
12	51	(Italy) Michele Pirro	Ducati Team	Ducati	28	+39.766	17	4
13	76	(France) Loris Baz	Avintia Racing	Ducati	28	+44.284	21	3
14	53	(Spain) Tito Rabat	Estrella Galicia 0,0 Marc VDS	Honda	28	+45.004	18	2
15	35	(United Kingdom) Cal Crutchlow	LCR Honda	Honda	28	+1:03.246	7	1
16	19	(Spain) Álvaro Bautista	Aprilia Racing Team Gresini	Aprilia	28	+1:12.448	19	
17	68	(Colombia) Yonny Hernández	Pull & Bear Aspar Team	Ducati	28	+1:14.517	16	
18	50	(Republic of Ireland) Eugene Laverty	Pull & Bear Aspar Team	Ducati	28	+1:36.510	11	
19	6	(Germany) Stefan Bradl	Aprilia Racing Team Gresini	Aprilia	27	+1 lap	20	
Ret	41	(Spain) Aleix Espargaró	Team Suzuki Ecstar	Suzuki	24	Hand Discomfort	9	
DSQ	8	(Spain) Héctor Barberá	Avintia Racing	Ducati	12	Black flag	10	
DNS	43	(Australia) Jack Miller	Estrella Galicia 0,0 Marc VDS	Honda		Did not start		
Sources:

- Hector Barbera was black flagged for ignoring the jump start ride-through penalty.
- Jack Miller crashed during Sunday morning warm-up and suffered a broken right wrist & fractured vertebra.

=== Moto2 ===
Pos.	No.	Rider	Manufacturer	Laps	Time/Retired	Grid	Points
1	5	(France) Johann Zarco	Kalex	25	37:34.180	1	25
2	21	(Italy) Franco Morbidelli	Kalex	25	+3.058	2	20
3	40	(Spain) Álex Rins	Kalex	25	+3.376	9	16
4	12	(Switzerland) Thomas Lüthi	Kalex	25	+3.467	3	13
5	23	(Germany) Marcel Schrötter	Kalex	25	+4.740	4	11
6	73	(Spain) Álex Márquez	Kalex	25	+9.416	5	10
7	30	(Japan) Takaaki Nakagami	Kalex	25	+10.178	8	9
8	7	(Italy) Lorenzo Baldassarri	Kalex	25	+11.951	12	8
9	49	(Spain) Axel Pons	Kalex	25	+12.801	6	7
10	77	(Switzerland) Dominique Aegerter	Kalex	25	+13.977	11	6
11	11	(Germany) Sandro Cortese	Kalex	25	+18.046	13	5
12	52	(United Kingdom) Danny Kent	Kalex	25	+18.284	15	4
13	54	(Italy) Mattia Pasini	Kalex	25	+18.424	17	3
14	44	(Portugal) Miguel Oliveira	Kalex	25	+18.830	18	2
15	60	(Spain) Julián Simón	Speed Up	25	+20.022	20	1
16	97	(Spain) Xavi Vierge	Tech 3	25	+28.885	27	
17	10	(Italy) Luca Marini	Kalex	25	+28.970	19	
18	32	(Spain) Isaac Viñales	Tech 3	25	+29.032	25	
19	87	(Australia) Remy Gardner	Kalex	25	+29.115	23	
20	57	(Spain) Edgar Pons	Kalex	25	+29.424	14	
21	55	(Malaysia) Hafizh Syahrin	Kalex	25	+29.977	16	
22	14	(Thailand) Ratthapark Wilairot	Kalex	25	+37.935	21	
23	19	(Belgium) Xavier Siméon	Speed Up	25	+43.276	24	
24	2	(Switzerland) Jesko Raffin	Kalex	25	+44.206	26	
25	70	(Switzerland) Robin Mulhauser	Kalex	25	+48.835	28	
26	94	(Germany) Jonas Folger	Kalex	25	+1:12.148	10	
Ret	24	(Italy) Simone Corsi	Speed Up	12	Accident Damage	22	
Ret	22	(United Kingdom) Sam Lowes	Kalex	9	Accident	7	
OFFICIAL MOTO2 REPORT

=== Moto3 ===
Pos.	No.	Rider	Manufacturer	Laps	Time/Retired	Grid	Points
1	36	(Spain) Joan Mir	KTM	23	37:23.325	1	25
2	41	(South Africa) Brad Binder	KTM	23	+0.279	2	20
3	33	(Italy) Enea Bastianini	Honda	23	+0.431	3	16
4	20	(France) Fabio Quartararo	KTM	23	+0.439	5	13
5	65	(Germany) Philipp Öttl	KTM	23	+0.600	8	11
6	88	(Spain) Jorge Martín	Mahindra	23	+4.134	13	10
7	64	(Netherlands) Bo Bendsneyder	KTM	23	+4.161	10	9
8	4	(Italy) Fabio Di Giannantonio	Honda	23	+4.970	9	8
9	8	(Italy) Nicolò Bulega	KTM	23	+4.972	7	7
10	11	(Belgium) Livio Loi	Honda	23	+5.262	21	6
11	21	(Italy) Francesco Bagnaia	Mahindra	23	+5.415	6	5
12	58	(Spain) Juan Francisco Guevara	KTM	23	+5.871	14	4
13	55	(Italy) Andrea Locatelli	KTM	23	+5.905	15	3
14	6	(Spain) María Herrera	KTM	23	+12.775	30	2
15	76	(Japan) Hiroki Ono	Honda	23	+12.839	24	1
16	95	(France) Jules Danilo	Honda	23	+12.942	11	
17	40	(South Africa) Darryn Binder	Mahindra	23	+14.090	16	
18	23	(Italy) Niccolò Antonelli	Honda	23	+14.406	12	
19	84	(Czech Republic) Jakub Kornfeil	Honda	23	+14.517	23	
20	62	(Italy) Stefano Manzi	Mahindra	23	+14.545	22	
21	44	(Spain) Arón Canet	Honda	23	+14.663	4	
22	12	(Spain) Albert Arenas	Peugeot	23	+17.132	26	
23	7	(Malaysia) Adam Norrodin	Honda	23	+17.443	25	
24	17	(United Kingdom) John McPhee	Peugeot	23	+28.306	28	
25	16	(Italy) Andrea Migno	KTM	23	+28.405	20	
26	42	(Spain) Marcos Ramírez	Mahindra	23	+40.213	31	
27	89	(Malaysia) Khairul Idham Pawi	Honda	23	+40.361	27	
28	43	(Italy) Stefano Valtulini	Mahindra	23	+1:04.040	29	
29	3	(Italy) Fabio Spiranelli	Mahindra	23	+1:04.058	33	
30	77	(Italy) Lorenzo Petrarca	Mahindra	23	+1:04.513	34	
Ret	9	(Spain) Jorge Navarro	Honda	18	Accident	17	
Ret	19	(Argentina) Gabriel Rodrigo	KTM	14	Accident	18	
Ret	53	(Italy) Marco Bezzecchi	Mahindra	5	Accident	19	
Ret	24	(Japan) Tatsuki Suzuki	Mahindra	5	Accident	32	
DNS	5	(Italy) Romano Fenati	KTM		Did not start		
OFFICIAL MOTO3 REPORT

- Romano Fenati was suspended by his VR46 team following disciplinary issues.

== Championship standings after the race (MotoGP) ==
Below are the standings for the top five riders and constructors after round ten has concluded.

Riders' Championship standings

Pos.	Rider	Points
1	(Spain) Marc Marquez	181
2	(Spain) Jorge Lorenzo	138
3	(Italy) Valentino Rossi	124
4	(Spain) Dani Pedrosa	105
5	(Spain) Maverick Vinales	93

Constructors' Championship standings

Pos.	Constructor	Points
1	(Japan) Yamaha	202
2	(Japan) Honda	196
3	(Italy) Ducati	149
4	(Japan) Suzuki	99
5	(Italy) Aprilia	51

- Note: Only the top five positions are included for both sets of standings.

Previous race: 2016 German Grand Prix	FIM Grand Prix World Championship; 2016 season	Next race: 2016 Czech Republic Grand Prix
Previous race: 1997 Austrian Grand Prix	Austrian motorcycle Grand Prix	Next race: 2017 Austrian Grand Prix
