= 2017 Dutch TT =

2017 motorcycle racing season

(Netherlands) 2017 Dutch TT
Race details
- Race 8 of 18 races in the 2017 Grand Prix motorcycle racing season
- Date: 25 June 2017
- Official name: Motul TT Assen
- Location: TT Circuit Assen
- Course: Permanent racing facility; 4.542 km (2.822 mi)

MotoGP
Pole position
Rider	(France) Johann Zarco	Yamaha
Time	1:46.141	
Fastest lap
Rider	(United Kingdom) Scott Redding	Ducati
Time	1:34.617 on lap 6	
Podium
First	(Italy) Valentino Rossi	Yamaha
Second	(Italy) Danilo Petrucci	Ducati
Third	(Spain) Marc Márquez	Honda

Moto2
Pole position
Rider	(Italy) Franco Morbidelli	Kalex
Time	1:38.468	
Fastest lap
Rider	(Italy) Franco Morbidelli	Kalex
Time	1:38.223 on lap 17	
Podium
First	(Italy) Franco Morbidelli	Kalex
Second	(Switzerland) Thomas Lüthi	Kalex
Third	(Japan) Takaaki Nakagami	Kalex

Moto3
Pole position
Rider	(Spain) Jorge Martín	Honda
Time	1:57.595	
Fastest lap
Rider	(Spain) Arón Canet	Honda
Time	1:42.902 on lap 11	
Podium
First	(Spain) Arón Canet	Honda
Second	(Italy) Romano Fenati	Honda
Third	(United Kingdom) John McPhee	Honda

The 2017 Dutch TT was the eighth round of the 2017 MotoGP season. It was held at the TT Circuit Assen in Assen on 25 June 2017. The MotoGP race was won by Valentino Rossi, the final victory of his career.

== Classification ==
=== MotoGP ===
Pos.	No.	Rider	Team	Manufacturer	Laps	Time/Retired	Grid	Points
1	46	(Italy) Valentino Rossi	Movistar Yamaha MotoGP	Yamaha	26	41:41.149	4	25
2	9	(Italy) Danilo Petrucci	Octo Pramac Racing	Ducati	26	+0.063	3	20
3	93	(Spain) Marc Márquez	Repsol Honda Team	Honda	26	+5.201	2	16
4	35	(United Kingdom) Cal Crutchlow	LCR Honda	Honda	26	+5.243	8	13
5	4	(Italy) Andrea Dovizioso	Ducati Team	Ducati	26	+5.327	9	11
6	43	(Australia) Jack Miller	EG 0,0 Marc VDS	Honda	26	+23.390	13	10
7	17	(Czech Republic) Karel Abraham	Pull&Bear Aspar Team	Ducati	26	+36.982	18	9
8	76	(France) Loris Baz	Reale Avintia Racing	Ducati	26	+37.058	14	8
9	29	(Italy) Andrea Iannone	Team Suzuki Ecstar	Suzuki	26	+37.166	16	7
10	41	(Spain) Aleix Espargaró	Aprilia Racing Team Gresini	Aprilia	26	+1:01.929	15	6
11	44	(Spain) Pol Espargaró	Red Bull KTM Factory Racing	KTM	26	+1:09.384	19	5
12	53	(Spain) Tito Rabat	EG 0,0 Marc VDS	Honda	26	+1:10.121	23	4
13	26	(Spain) Dani Pedrosa	Repsol Honda Team	Honda	26	+1:10.344	12	3
14	5	(France) Johann Zarco	Monster Yamaha Tech 3	Yamaha	26	+1:35.655	1	2
15	99	(Spain) Jorge Lorenzo	Ducati Team	Ducati	25	+1 lap	21	1
16	8	(Spain) Héctor Barberá	Reale Avintia Racing	Ducati	25	+1 lap	20	
17	42	(Spain) Álex Rins	Team Suzuki Ecstar	Suzuki	25	+1 lap	17	
Ret	45	(United Kingdom) Scott Redding	Octo Pramac Racing	Ducati	24	Accident	5	
Ret	19	(Spain) Álvaro Bautista	Pull&Bear Aspar Team	Ducati	17	Accident	7	
Ret	38	(United Kingdom) Bradley Smith	Red Bull KTM Factory Racing	KTM	13	Accident	22	
Ret	25	(Spain) Maverick Viñales	Movistar Yamaha MotoGP	Yamaha	11	Accident	11	
Ret	94	(Germany) Jonas Folger	Monster Yamaha Tech 3	Yamaha	9	Accident	6	
Ret	22	(United Kingdom) Sam Lowes	Aprilia Racing Team Gresini	Aprilia	8	Accident	10	

=== Moto2 ===
Pos.	No.	Rider	Manufacturer	Laps	Time/Retired	Grid	Points
1	21	(Italy) Franco Morbidelli	Kalex	24	39:39.120	1	25
2	12	(Switzerland) Thomas Lüthi	Kalex	24	+0.158	3	20
3	30	(Japan) Takaaki Nakagami	Kalex	24	+0.630	2	16
4 (Note: 1 place penalty for exceeding track limits.)	54	(Italy) Mattia Pasini	Kalex	24	+0.394	7	13
5	44	(Portugal) Miguel Oliveira	KTM	24	+0.657	4	11
6	73	(Spain) Álex Márquez	Kalex	24	+2.774	8	10
7	19	(Belgium) Xavier Siméon	Kalex	24	+6.967	6	9
8	55	(Malaysia) Hafizh Syahrin	Kalex	24	+7.027	12	8
9	40	(France) Fabio Quartararo	Kalex	24	+11.089	5	7
10	42	(Italy) Francesco Bagnaia	Kalex	24	+11.623	13	6
11	23	(Germany) Marcel Schrötter	Suter	24	+14.196	9	5
12	77	(Switzerland) Dominique Aegerter	Suter	24	+14.521	11	4
13	41	(South Africa) Brad Binder	KTM	24	+18.210	17	3
14	68	(Colombia) Yonny Hernández	Kalex	24	+18.926	18	2
15	9	(Spain) Jorge Navarro	Kalex	24	+21.767	19	1
16	87	(Australia) Remy Gardner	Tech 3	24	+22.008	21	
17	2	(Switzerland) Jesko Raffin	Kalex	24	+22.179	20	
18	5	(Italy) Andrea Locatelli	Kalex	24	+32.097	23	
19	37	(Spain) Augusto Fernández	Speed Up	24	+32.231	22	
20	62	(Italy) Stefano Manzi	Kalex	24	+40.349	25	
21	45	(Japan) Tetsuta Nagashima	Kalex	24	+44.830	24	
22	49	(Spain) Axel Pons	Kalex	24	+48.509	10	
23	27	(Spain) Iker Lecuona	Kalex	24	+57.518	27	
24	57	(Spain) Edgar Pons	Kalex	24	+1:06.824	28	
25	6	(United Kingdom) Tarran Mackenzie	Suter	24	+1:24.146	29	
26	89	(Malaysia) Khairul Idham Pawi	Kalex	21	+3 laps	26	
Ret	32	(Spain) Isaac Viñales	Kalex	11	Retired	16	
Ret	11	(Germany) Sandro Cortese	Suter	5	Accident	30	
Ret	10	(Italy) Luca Marini	Kalex	1	Collision	14	
Ret	24	(Italy) Simone Corsi	Speed Up	1	Collision	15	
DNS	7	(Italy) Lorenzo Baldassarri	Kalex		Did not start		
DNS	97	(Spain) Xavi Vierge	Tech 3		Did not start		
OFFICIAL MOTO2 REPORT

- Lorenzo Baldassari suffered a concussion in a crash during qualifying and withdrew from the event.
- Xavi Vierge suffered a broken arm in a crash during free practice and withdrew from the event.

=== Moto3 ===
Pos.	No.	Rider	Manufacturer	Laps	Time/Retired	Grid	Points
1	44	(Spain) Arón Canet	Honda	22	38:20.364	6	25
2	5	(Italy) Romano Fenati	Honda	22	+0.035	15	20
3	17	(United Kingdom) John McPhee	Honda	22	+0.117	19	16
4	88	(Spain) Jorge Martín	Honda	22	+0.310	1	13
5	95	(France) Jules Danilo	Honda	22	+0.532	14	11
6	42	(Spain) Marcos Ramírez	KTM	22	+0.594	23	10
7	19	(Argentina) Gabriel Rodrigo	KTM	22	+0.651	12	9
8	24	(Japan) Tatsuki Suzuki	Honda	22	+0.679	10	8
9	36	(Spain) Joan Mir	Honda	22	+0.980	7	7
10	8	(Italy) Nicolò Bulega	KTM	22	+6.972	3	6
11	65	(Germany) Philipp Öttl	KTM	22	+8.196	25	5
12	58	(Spain) Juan Francisco Guevara	KTM	22	+9.200	29	4
13	40	(South Africa) Darryn Binder	KTM	22	+10.746	27	3
14	16	(Italy) Andrea Migno	KTM	22	+10.890	26	2
15	71	(Japan) Ayumu Sasaki	Honda	22	+10.920	22	1
16	12	(Italy) Marco Bezzecchi	Mahindra	22	+16.249	5	
17	84	(Czech Republic) Jakub Kornfeil	Peugeot	22	+16.344	13	
18	41	(Thailand) Nakarin Atiratphuvapat	Honda	22	+16.479	4	
19	27	(Japan) Kaito Toba	Honda	22	+33.845	31	
20	6	(Spain) María Herrera	KTM	22	+34.172	16	
21	11	(Belgium) Livio Loi	Honda	22	+34.338	18	
22	4	(Finland) Patrik Pulkkinen	Peugeot	22	+48.171	20	
Ret	7	(Malaysia) Adam Norrodin	Honda	21	Accident	11	
Ret	64	(Netherlands) Bo Bendsneyder	KTM	21	Accident	2	
Ret	31	(Spain) Raúl Fernández	Mahindra	20	Accident	30	
Ret	33	(Italy) Enea Bastianini	Honda	14	Accident Damage	17	
Ret	48	(Italy) Lorenzo Dalla Porta	Mahindra	14	Handling	24	
Ret	14	(Italy) Tony Arbolino	Honda	7	Handling	8	
Ret	96	(Italy) Manuel Pagliani	Mahindra	6	Accident	9	
Ret	21	(Italy) Fabio Di Giannantonio	Honda	3	Accident Damage	21	
Ret	28	(Netherlands) Ryan van de Lagemaat	KTM	2	Accident	28	
DNS	23	(Italy) Niccolò Antonelli	KTM		Back Pain		
OFFICIAL MOTO3 REPORT

== Championship standings after the race ==
=== MotoGP ===
Below are the standings for the top five riders and constructors after round eight has concluded.

Riders' Championship standings

Pos.	Rider	Points
1	(Italy) Andrea Dovizioso	115
2	(Spain) Maverick Viñales	111
3	(Italy) Valentino Rossi	108
4	(Spain) Marc Márquez	104
5	(Spain) Dani Pedrosa	87

Constructors' Championship standings

Pos.	Constructor	Points
1	(Japan) Yamaha	164
2	(Italy) Ducati	142
3	(Japan) Honda	141
4	(Japan) Suzuki	35
5	(Italy) Aprilia	25

- Note: Only the top five positions are included for both sets of standings.

=== Moto2 ===
Pos.	Rider	Points
1	(Italy) Franco Morbidelli	149
2	(Switzerland) Thomas Lüthi	140
3	(Spain) Álex Márquez	113
4	(Portugal) Miguel Oliveira	97
5	(Japan) Takaaki Nakagami	63
6	(Italy) Mattia Pasini	62
7	(Italy) Francesco Bagnaia	62
8	(Switzerland) Dominique Aegerter	50
9	(Italy) Luca Marini	41
10	(Spain) Xavi Vierge	40

=== Moto3 ===
Pos.	Rider	Points
1	(Spain) Joan Mir	140
2	(Spain) Arón Canet	110
3	(Italy) Romano Fenati	108
4	(Spain) Jorge Martín	89
5	(United Kingdom) John McPhee	83
6	(Italy) Fabio Di Giannantonio	80
7	(Italy) Andrea Migno	78
8	(Spain) Marcos Ramírez	63
9	(Spain) Juan Francisco Guevara	54
10	(Italy) Enea Bastianini	49

== Notes ==
Previous race: 2017 Catalan Grand Prix	FIM Grand Prix World Championship; 2017 season	Next race: 2017 German Grand Prix
Previous race: 2016 Dutch TT	Dutch TT	Next race: 2018 Dutch TT
