= Jonas Folger =

German motorcycle racer

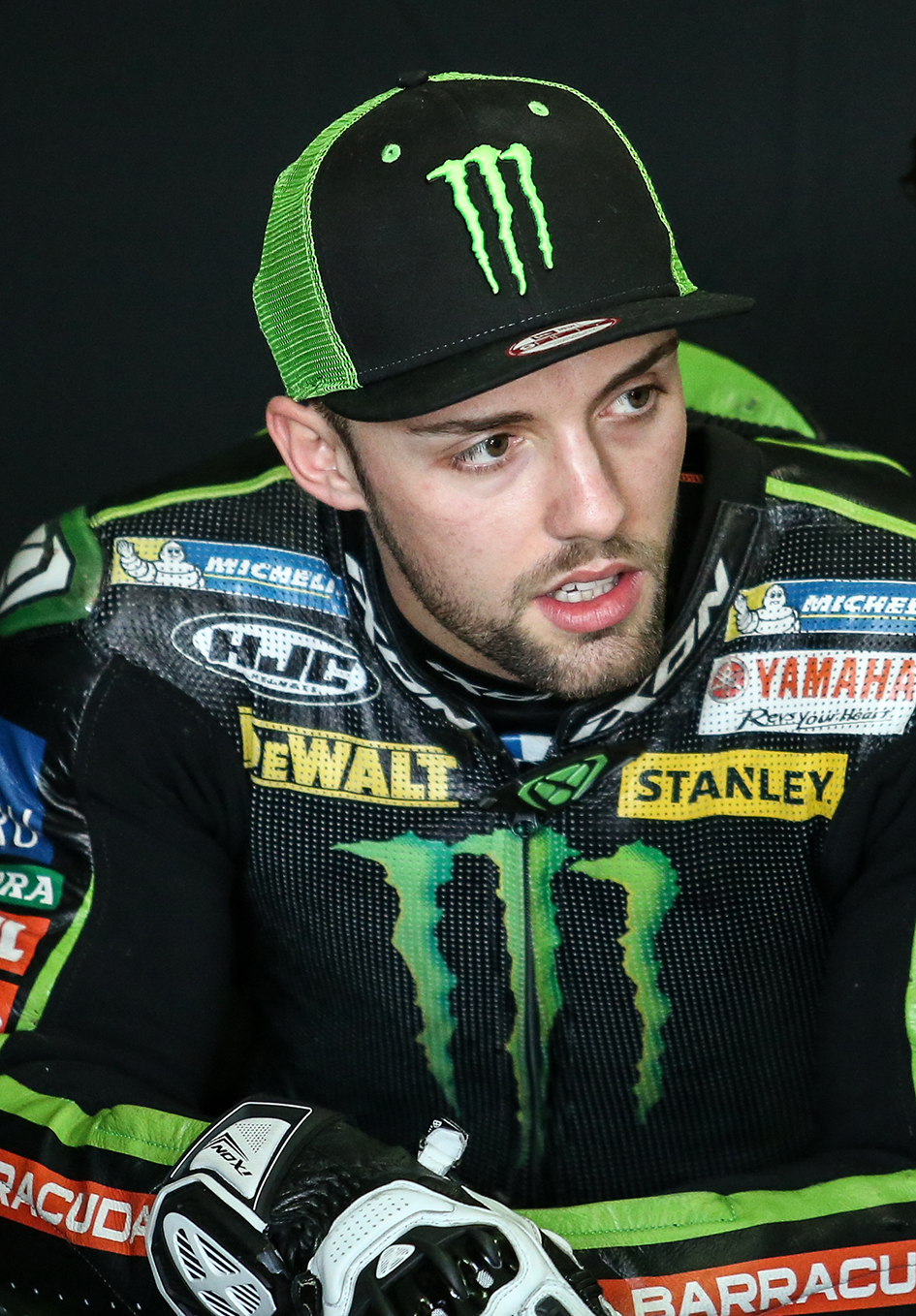
- Folger in 2017
- Nationality: German
- Born: 13 August 1993 (age 33); Mühldorf, Germany
- Current team: Red Bull KTM Tech3 (temporary rider); Red Bull KTM Factory Racing (test rider)
- Bike number: 94
- Website: Jonas Folger
Motorcycle racing career statistics
MotoGP World Championship
| Active years | 2017, 2023, 2026 |
| Manufacturers | Yamaha (2017); KTM (2023, 2026) |
| Championships | 0 |
| 2023 championship position | 25th (9 pts) |
Starts / Wins / Podiums / Poles / F. laps / Points; 20 / 0 / 1 / 0 / 2 / 93
Moto2 World Championship
| Active years | 2014–2016, 2019 |
| Manufacturers | Kalex |
| Championships | 0 |
| 2019 championship position | NC (0 pts) |
Starts / Wins / Podiums / Poles / F. laps / Points; 59 / 3 / 11 / 2 / 5 / 393
Moto3 World Championship
| Active years | 2012–2013 |
| Manufacturers | Ioda, Kalex KTM |
| Championships | 0 |
| 2013 championship position | 5th (183 pts) |
Starts / Wins / Podiums / Poles / F. laps / Points; 31 / 1 / 8 / 4 / 1 / 276
125cc World Championship
| Active years | 2008–2011 |
| Manufacturers | KTM, Aprilia |
| Championships | 0 |
| 2011 championship position | 6th (161 pts) |
Starts / Wins / Podiums / Poles / F. laps / Points; 53 / 1 / 4 / 0 / 0 / 304
Superbike World Championship
| Active years | 2021 |
| Manufacturers | BMW |
| Championships | 0 |
| 2021 championship position | 22nd (21 pts) |
Starts / Wins / Podiums / Poles / F. laps / Points; 27 / 0 / 0 / 0 / 0 / 21

Jonas Folger (born 13 August 1993) is a German professional motorcycle racer who most recently regularly competed in the 2021 Superbike World Championship.

Folger is best known for his stint in MotoGP with Monster Yamaha Tech 3, getting a 2017 podium in Germany. His subsequent career has been affected by illness, having been diagnosed with Gilbert's syndrome. Folger is also a race winner in both Moto3 and Moto2, and in 2020, he won the IDM Superbike Championship with MGM Racing.

== Career ==
=== 125cc World Championship ===
In the 2009 125 World Championship, Folger took his first podium and was Rookie of the Year.

==== Red Bull Ajo Motorsport ====
In 2011, Folger moved to Aki Ajo's team taking his first win and two more.

=== Return to MotoGP ===
==== GasGas Tech3 Factory Racing (2023) ====
Folger was chosen to replace the injured Pol Espargaro starting from the American Grand Prix at COTA in mid-April, and was expected to make his first MotoGP appearance since 2017, soon after becoming one of three official test riders for the KTM manufacturer. Folger previously represented the Tech3 team - scoring a runner-up result at his home Grand Prix.

== Career statistics ==
=== Grand Prix motorcycle racing ===
==== By season ====
| Season | Class | Motorcycle | Team | Race | Win | Podium | Pole | FLap | Pts | Plcd |
|---|---|---|---|---|---|---|---|---|---|---|
| 2008 | 125cc | KTM | Red Bull MotoGP Academy | 3 | 0 | 0 | 0 | 0 | 1 | 34th |
| 2008 | 125cc | KTM | Red Bull KTM 125 | 3 | 0 | 0 | 0 | 0 | 1 | 34th |
| 2009 | 125cc | Aprilia | Ongetta Team I.S.P.A. | 16 | 0 | 1 | 0 | 0 | 73 | 12th |
| 2010 | 125cc | Aprilia | Ongetta Team I.S.P.A. | 15 | 0 | 0 | 0 | 0 | 69 | 14th |
| 2011 | 125cc | Aprilia | Red Bull Ajo Motorsport | 16 | 1 | 3 | 0 | 0 | 161 | 6th |
| 2012 | Moto3 | Ioda | IodaRacing Project | 15 | 1 | 4 | 2 | 0 | 93 | 9th |
| 2012 | Moto3 | Kalex KTM | Mapfre Aspar Team Moto3 | 15 | 1 | 4 | 2 | 0 | 93 | 9th |
| 2013 | Moto3 | Kalex KTM | Mapfre Aspar Team Moto3 | 16 | 0 | 4 | 2 | 1 | 183 | 5th |
| 2014 | Moto2 | Kalex | AGR Team | 18 | 0 | 2 | 1 | 1 | 63 | 15th |
| 2015 | Moto2 | Kalex | AGR Team | 18 | 2 | 4 | 0 | 3 | 163 | 6th |
| 2016 | Moto2 | Kalex | Dynavolt Intact GP | 18 | 1 | 5 | 1 | 1 | 167 | 7th |
| 2017 | MotoGP | Yamaha | Monster Yamaha Tech 3 | 13 | 0 | 1 | 0 | 2 | 84 | 10th |
| 2019 | Moto2 | Kalex | Petronas Sprinta Racing | 5 | 0 | 0 | 0 | 0 | 0 | 32nd |
| 2023 | MotoGP | KTM | GasGas Tech3 Factory Racing | 6 | 0 | 0 | 0 | 0 | 9 | 25th |
| 2026 | MotoGP | KTM | Red Bull KTM Tech3 | 1 | 0 | 0 | 0 | 0 | 0* | 28th* |
| Total | | | | **163** | **5** | **24** | **6** | **8** | **1066** | |

==== By class ====
| Class | Seasons | 1st GP | 1st Pod | 1st Win | Race | Win | Podiums | Pole | FLap | Pts | WChmp |
|---|---|---|---|---|---|---|---|---|---|---|---|
| 125cc | 2008–2011 | 2008 Czech Republic | 2009 France | 2011 Great Britain | 53 | 1 | 4 | 0 | 0 | 304 | 0 |
| Moto3 | 2012–2013 | 2012 Qatar | 2012 Indianapolis | 2012 Czech Republic | 31 | 1 | 8 | 4 | 1 | 276 | 0 |
| Moto2 | 2014–2016, 2019 | 2014 Qatar | 2014 Spain | 2015 Qatar | 59 | 3 | 11 | 2 | 5 | 393 | 0 |
| MotoGP | 2017, 2023, 2026 | 2017 Qatar | 2017 Germany | | 20 | 0 | 1 | 0 | 2 | 93 | 0 |
| Total | 2008–2019, 2023, 2026 | | | | **163** | **5** | **24** | **6** | **8** | **1066** | **0** |

==== Races by year ====
(key) (Races in bold indicate pole position, races in italics indicate fastest lap)

| Year | Class | Bike | 1 | 2 | 3 | 4 | 5 | 6 | 7 | 8 | 9 | 10 | 11 | 12 | 13 | 14 | 15 | 16 | 17 | 18 | 19 | 20 | 21 | 22 | Pos | Pts |
|---|---|---|---|---|---|---|---|---|---|---|---|---|---|---|---|---|---|---|---|---|---|---|---|---|---|---|
| 2008 | 125cc | KTM | QAT | SPA | POR | CHN | FRA | ITA | CAT | GBR | NED | GER | CZE; Ret | RSM; 15 | INP; 24 | JPN; 16 | AUS | MAL; 17 | VAL; 18 | | | | | | 34th | 1 |
| 2009 | 125cc | Aprilia | QAT; 6 | JPN; 8 | SPA; Ret | FRA; 2 | ITA; 14 | CAT; 6 | NED; 7 | GER; Ret | GBR; Ret | CZE; 12 | INP; 12 | RSM; 9 | POR; 14 | AUS; 14 | MAL; Ret | VAL; Ret | | | | | | | 12th | 73 |
| 2010 | 125cc | Aprilia | QAT; 15 | SPA; Ret | FRA; 13 | ITA; 11 | GBR; 15 | NED; 10 | CAT; 9 | GER; 16 | CZE; 4 | INP; 9 | RSM; 11 | ARA; 8 | JPN; Ret | MAL; DNS | AUS | POR; 4 | VAL; Ret | | | | | | 14th | 69 |
| 2011 | 125cc | Aprilia | QAT; 5 | SPA; 2 | POR; 5 | FRA; 6 | CAT; 3 | GBR; 1 | NED; 8 | ITA; Ret | GER; 7 | CZE; DNS | INP; 9 | RSM; 9 | ARA; 10 | JPN; 6 | AUS; Ret | MAL; 6 | VAL; 5 | | | | | | 6th | 161 |
| 2012 | Moto3 | Ioda | QAT; Ret | SPA; WD | POR | FRA; 11 | CAT; Ret | GBR; Ret | NED; Ret | GER; Ret | ITA; Ret | | | | | | | | | | | | | | 9th | 93 |
| 2012 | Moto3 | Kalex KTM | | | | | | | | | | INP; 3 | CZE; 1 | RSM; 6 | **ARA**; 3 | JPN; Ret | MAL; 3 | AUS; 11 | **VAL**; Ret | | | | | | 9th | 93 |
| 2013 | Moto3 | Kalex KTM | QAT; 5 | AME; 4 | SPA; 3 | FRA; 4 | **ITA**; 6 | CAT; DNS | NED; 6 | GER; 8 | INP; 4 | CZE; 3 | GBR; 6 | **RSM**; Ret | ARA; 7 | MAL; 8 | AUS; 6 | JPN; 3 | VAL; 2 | | | | | | 5th | 183 |
| 2014 | Moto2 | Kalex | QAT; 11 | AME; Ret | ARG; 16 | SPA; 3 | **FRA**; 6 | ITA; 3 | CAT; Ret | NED; 23 | GER; Ret | INP; 18 | CZE; 15 | GBR; Ret | RSM; 19 | ARA; 23 | JPN; 12 | AUS; 15 | MAL; 9 | VAL; 13 | | | | | 15th | 63 |
| 2015 | Moto2 | Kalex | QAT; 1 | AME; 16 | ARG; 9 | SPA; 1 | FRA; Ret | ITA; Ret | CAT; 7 | NED; 7 | GER; 14 | INP; 12 | CZE; 6 | GBR; 5 | RSM; 6 | ARA; 4 | JPN; 2 | AUS; Ret | MAL; 3 | VAL; 14 | | | | | 6th | 163 |
| 2016 | Moto2 | Kalex | **QAT**; Ret | ARG; 3 | AME; 5 | SPA; 2 | FRA; Ret | ITA; 15 | CAT; 7 | NED; 10 | GER; 2 | AUT; 26 | CZE; 1 | GBR; 5 | RSM; 8 | ARA; 10 | JPN; Ret | AUS; 6 | MAL; 3 | VAL; 8 | | | | | 7th | 167 |
| 2017 | MotoGP | Yamaha | QAT; 10 | ARG; 6 | AME; 11 | SPA; 8 | FRA; 7 | ITA; 13 | CAT; 6 | NED; Ret | GER; 2 | CZE; 10 | AUT; Ret | GBR; DNS | RSM; 9 | ARA; 16 | JPN | AUS | MAL | VAL | | | | | 10th | 84 |
| 2019 | Moto2 | Kalex | QAT | ARG | AME | SPA | FRA | ITA | CAT; 19 | NED; 17 | GER; 17 | CZE; 19 | AUT; 18 | GBR | RSM | ARA | THA | JPN | AUS | MAL | VAL | | | | 32nd | 0 |
| 2023 | MotoGP | KTM | POR | ARG | AME; 12 | SPA; 17 | FRA; 13 | ITA; 19 | GER; 17 | NED; 14 | GBR | AUT | CAT | RSM | IND | JPN | INA | AUS | THA | MAL | QAT | VAL | | | 25th | 9 |
| 2026 | MotoGP | KTM | THA | BRA | USA | SPA | FRA; 16 | CAT | ITA | HUN | CZE | NED | GER | GBR | ARA | RSM | AUT | JPN | INA | AUS | MAL | QAT | POR | VAL | 28th* | 0* |

=== Superbike World Championship ===
==== Races by year ====
(key) (Races in bold indicate pole position, races in italics indicate fastest lap)

| Year | Bike | 1 | | | 2 | | | 3 | | | 4 | | | 5 | | | 6 | | | 7 | | | 8 | | | 9 | | | 10 | | | 11 | | | 12 | | | 13 | | | Pos | Pts |
| Year | Bike | R1 | SR | R2 | R1 | SR | R2 | R1 | SR | R2 | R1 | SR | R2 | R1 | SR | R2 | R1 | SR | R2 | R1 | SR | R2 | R1 | SR | R2 | R1 | SR | R2 | R1 | SR | R2 | R1 | SR | R2 | R1 | SR | R2 | R1 | SR | R2 | Pos | Pts |
|---|---|---|---|---|---|---|---|---|---|---|---|---|---|---|---|---|---|---|---|---|---|---|---|---|---|---|---|---|---|---|---|---|---|---|---|---|---|---|---|---|---|---|
| 2021 | BMW | SPA; 16 | SPA; 13 | SPA; 8 | POR; 16 | POR; 12 | POR; Ret | ITA; 16 | ITA; 19 | ITA; 16 | GBR; Ret | GBR; 16 | GBR; Ret | NED; Ret | NED; DNS | NED; DNS | CZE; Ret | CZE; 18 | CZE; 16 | SPA; 14 | SPA; 16 | SPA; 12 | FRA; 16 | FRA; 18 | FRA; 16 | SPA; 19 | SPA; 13 | SPA; 16 | SPA; 14 | SPA; C | SPA; 13 | POR; 15 | POR; 13 | POR; 15 | ARG | ARG | ARG | INA | INA | INA | 22nd | 21 |

=== Suzuka 8 Hours results ===
| Year | Class | Team | Co-riders | Bike | Pos |
|---|---|---|---|---|---|
| 2025 | **EWC** | (Japan) S-Pulse Dream Racing | (Japan) Sodo Hamahara (Japan) Hideyuki Ogata | Suzuki GSX-R1000R | 42nd |
| 2026 | **EWC** | (Japan) S-Pulse Dream Racing | (Japan) Sho Nishimura (France) Jérémy Guarnoni | Suzuki GSX-R1000R | 11th |
