= Dominique Aegerter =

Swiss motorcycle racer (born 1990)

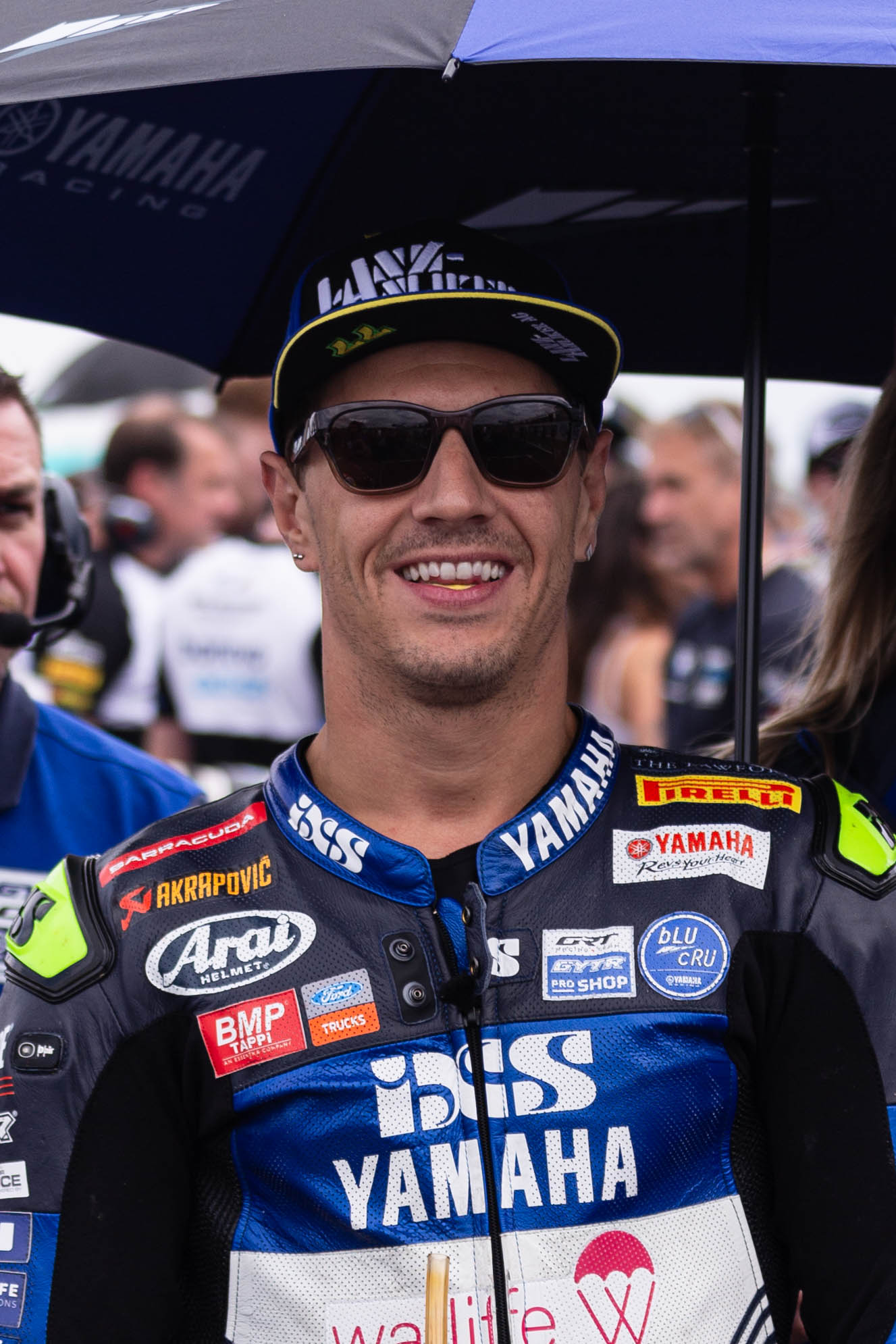
- Dominique Aegerter, Donington World Superbike 2024
- Nationality: Swiss
- Born: 30 September 1990 (age 36); Rohrbach, Switzerland
- Current team: Kawasaki WorldSSP Team
- Bike number: 77
- Website: https://www.domi77.com
Motorcycle racing career statistics
Moto2 World Championship
Active years	2010–2020
Manufacturers	Suter (2010–2014); Kalex (2015–2016); KTM (2018); MV Agusta (2019); NTS (2020)
Championships	0
2020 championship position	28th (4 pts)
Starts / Wins / Podiums / Poles / F. laps / Points; 168 / 1 / 7 / 1 / 1 / 903
125cc World Championship
Active years	2006–2009
Manufacturers	Aprilia (2006–2006); Derbi (2008–2009)
Championships	0
2009 championship position	13th (70.5 pts)
Starts / Wins / Podiums / Poles / F. laps / Points; 52 / 0 / 0 / 0 / 0 / 122.5
MotoE World Championship
Active years	2020–2022
Manufacturers	Energica
Championships	1 (2022)
2022 championship position	1st (227 pts)
Starts / Wins / Podiums / Poles / F. laps / Points; 26 / 5 / 18 / 4 / 4 / 417
Superbike World Championship
Active years	2023–2025
Manufacturers	Yamaha
Championships	0
2025 championship position	14th (100 pts)
Starts / Wins / Podiums / Poles / F. laps / Points; 91 / 0 / 2 / 0 / 2 / 354
Supersport World Championship
Active years	2021–2022, 2026–
Manufacturers	Yamaha, Kawasaki
Championships	2 (2021, 2022)
2022 championship position	1st (498 pts)
Starts / Wins / Podiums / Poles / F. laps / Points; 72 / 27 / 36 / 11 / 20 / 1003

Dominique Aegerter (born 30 September 1990) is a Swiss professional circuit racer of solo motorcycles, competing in World superbike Championship. He won the Supersport World Championship in 2021 and 2022. He also won the MotoE World Cup in 2022. He is also the first Swiss rider to set foot on a world SBK podium.

For 2023, Aegerter joined the GRT Yamaha team in World Superbikes.

== Career ==
=== Early career ===
Born in Rohrbach, Switzerland, Aegerter started his career in motocross. He then competed in the ADAC Pro Junior Cup 125cc class in 2003 and 2004. In 2005 he moved into the equivalent IDM class, where he competed until the end of 2006. Also in 2006, Aegerter was called up by Multimedia Racing to compete in the 125cc World Championship. Aegerter made his world championship debut in the Portuguese Grand Prix replacing fellow Swiss rider Vincent Braillard. He remained with the team for the rest of the season.

=== 125cc World Championship ===
Aegerter continued with Multimedia Racing for the 2007 Grand Prix motorcycle racing season and still had Italian teammates Raffaele De Rosa and Simone Grotzkyj. He had a very slow start only managing to score back to back 15th place at the 2007 Catalan motorcycle Grand Prix and at the 2007 Dutch TT, and later at the wet 2007 Japanese motorcycle Grand Prix at 11th place. This championship points scoring finishes only manage he finished at 23rd place with seven points.

For the 2008 Grand Prix motorcycle racing season, he was offered alongside Frenchman Mike Di Meglio by Ajo Motorsport to ride for them. They both accepted it, while Di Meglio has a full factory Derbi RSA 125, he used only a standard Derbi RS 125, making him the only Derbi rider to use a standard Derbi bike. Results improved however, as he finished 16th overall, peaking with three eighth places – ahead of di Meglio in Spain, and in San Marino and Malaysia.

For 2009, Aegerter stays with the team alongside Sandro Cortese. Both riders use the factory Derbi RSA 125, giving Aegerter hope for a stronger year than 2008. Sixth place in the wet at Le Mans was the highlight of the first half of the season.

=== Moto2 World Championship ===
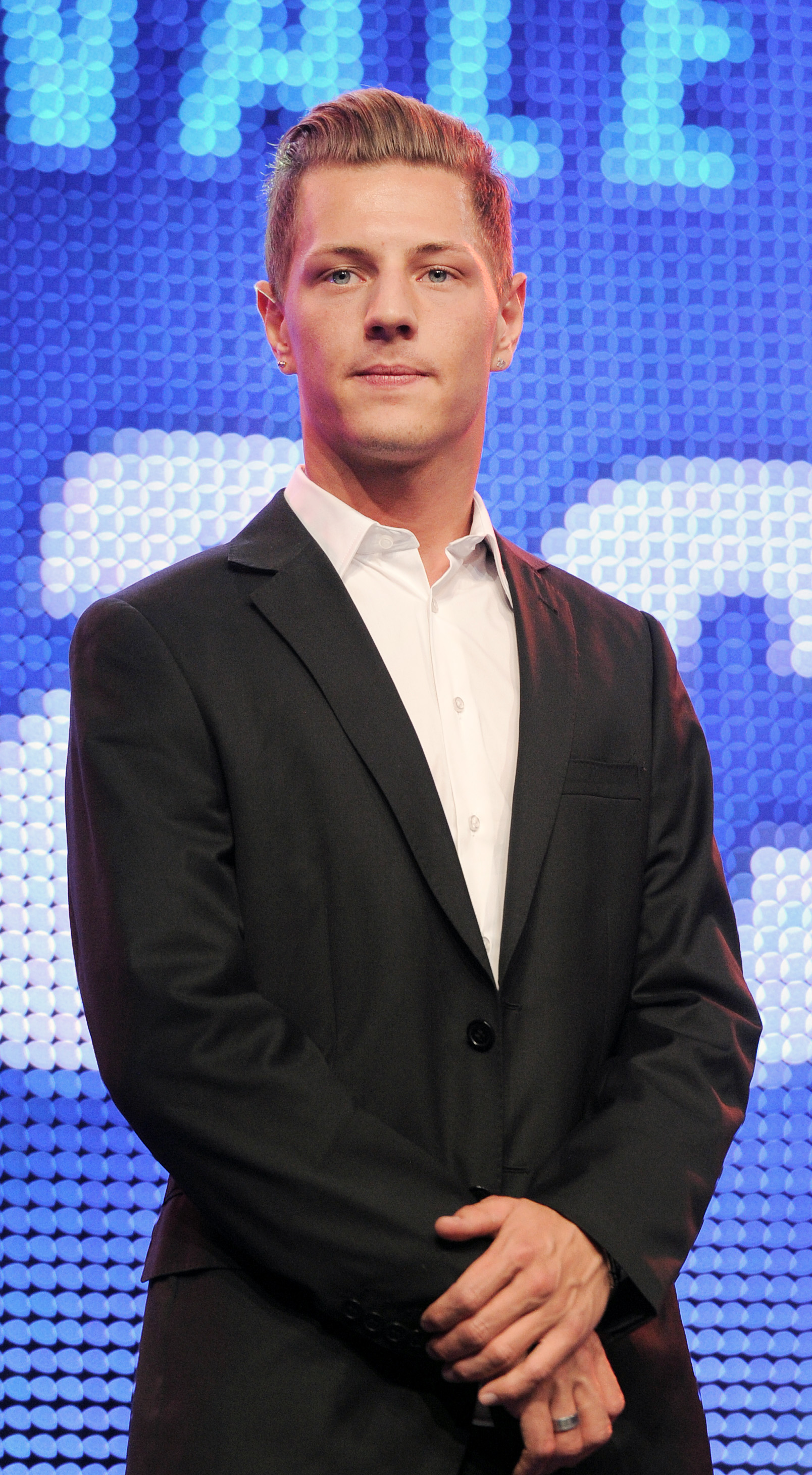
Aegerter in 2014

At the 2014 German Grand Prix, Aegerter achieved both his first Grand Prix pole position and victory in his 129th fending off Mika Kallio's advances in the closing stages.

=== MotoGP test ===
==== Kawasaki (2015) ====
In 2015, Aegerter took part in tests with Akira Kawasaki MotoGP who supplied Kawasaki engines to the Avintia Racing team in MotoGP along with the WSBK riders.

==== Suzuki (2022) ====
Aegerter made a debut-ride in September 2022 at the Misano World Circuit Marco Simoncelli, near Misano, Italy, with Team Suzuki Ecstar in a mid-season test. He rode a Suzuki GSX-RR motorcycle due to injury of the regular rider. Aegerter has previously competed for Suzuki in the Suzuka 8 Hours endurance race, when the Swiss racer was on the podium twice.

=== Supersport World Championship ===
Aegerter competed in the 2021 Supersport World Championship, winning the title with Ten Kate Racing Yamaha team.

In the 2022 Supersport World Championship, Aegerter received a one race ban for unsporting behaviour when leading the championship with nine consecutive wins. After a crash caused by another rider at the first corner of lap one at the Most round, he simulated an injury to try to force a red flag and start the race again.

=== Superbike World Championship ===
==== GRT Yamaha WorldSBK Team (from 2023) ====
After he clinched the World Supersport world championship in 2022, Aegerter joined GRT Yamaha WorldSBK Team for the 2023 Superbike World Championship.

=== CIV Superbike Championship ===
In 2024, Aegerter competed in the CIV Superbike championship in Italy as a wildcard entry at the Misano World Circuit Marco Simoncelli. Aegerter used the event as training and preparation for the upcoming Superbike World Championship round in Portimao.

== Career statistics ==
=== Grand Prix motorcycle racing ===
==== By season ====
Season	Class	Motorcycle	Type	Team	Race	Win	Podium	Pole	FLap	Pts	Plcd
2006	125cc	Aprilia	Aprilia RS 125	Multimedia Racing	2	0	0	0	0	0	NC
2007	125cc	Aprilia	Aprilia RS 125	Multimedia Racing	17	0	0	0	0	7	23rd
2008	125cc	Derbi	Derbi RS 125	Ajo Motorsport	17	0	0	0	0	45	16th
2009	125cc	Derbi	Derbi RSA 125	Ajo Interwetten	16	0	0	0	0	70.5	13th
2010	Moto2	Suter	Suter MMX	Technomag-CIP	17	0	0	0	0	74	15th
2011	Moto2	Suter	Suter MMXI	Technomag-CIP	17	0	1	0	0	94	8th
2012	Moto2	Suter	Suter MMX2	Technomag-CIP	17	0	0	0	0	114	8th
2013	Moto2	Suter	Suter MMX2	Technomag carXpert	17	0	1	0	0	158	5th
2014	Moto2	Suter	Suter MMX2	Technomag carXpert	18	1	4	1	1	172	5th
2015	Moto2	Kalex	Kalex Moto2	Technomag Racing Interwetten	14	0	1	0	0	62	17th
2016	Moto2	Kalex	Kalex Moto2	CarXpert Interwetten	12	0	0	0	0	71	12th
2017	Moto2	Suter	Suter MMX2	Kiefer Racing	17	0	0	0	0	88	12th
2018	Moto2	KTM	KTM Moto2	Kiefer Racing	16	0	0	0	0	47	17th
2019	Moto2	MV Agusta	MV Agusta F2	MV Agusta Idealavoro Forward	19	0	0	0	0	19	22nd
2020	MotoE	Energica	Energica Ego Corsa	Dynavolt Intact GP	7	2	4	1	1	97	**3rd**
2020	Moto2	NTS	NTS NH7	NTS RW Racing GP	4	0	0	0	0	4	28th
2021	MotoE	Energica	Energica Ego Corsa	Dynavolt Intact GP	7	0	4	0	1	93	**2nd**
2022	MotoE	Energica	Energica Ego Corsa	Dynavolt Intact GP	12	3	10	3	2	227	**1st**
Total					**246**	**6**	**25**	**5**	**5**	**1442.5**	

==== By class ====
Class	Seasons	1st GP	1st pod	1st win	Race	Win	Podiums	Pole	FLap	Pts	WChmp
125cc	2006–2009	2006 Portugal			52	0	0	0	0	122.5	0
Moto2	2010–2020	2010 Qatar	2011 Valencia	2014 Germany	168	1	7	1	1	903	0
MotoE	2020–2022	2020 Spain	2020 Spain	2020 Andalusia	26	5	18	4	4	417	1
Total	2006–2022				**246**	**6**	**25**	**5**	**5**	**1442.5**	**1**

==== Races by year ====
(key) (Races in bold indicate pole position, races in italics indicate fastest lap)

Year	Class	Bike	1	2	3	4	5	6	7	8	9	10	11	12	13	14	15	16	17	18	19	Pos	Pts
2006	125cc	Aprilia	SPA	QAT	TUR	CHN	FRA	ITA	CAT	NED	GBR	GER	CZE	MAL	AUS	JPN	POR; 26	VAL; 29				NC	0
2007	125cc	Aprilia	QAT; 20	SPA; 19	TUR; 24	CHN; 21	FRA; 20	ITA; 15	CAT; 15	GBR; Ret	NED; 28	GER; 21	CZE; 29	RSM; 23	POR; Ret	JPN; 11	AUS; 19	MAL; Ret	VAL; 18			23rd	7
2008	125cc	Derbi	QAT; 17	SPA; 8	POR; 12	CHN; 17	FRA; 23	ITA; 24	CAT; 12	GBR; 19	NED; 16	GER; 10	CZE; 14	RSM; 8	INP; 11	JPN; 19	AUS; Ret	MAL; 8	VAL; Ret			16th	45
2009	125cc	Derbi	QAT; 11	JPN; 9	SPA; 9	FRA; 6	ITA; 19	CAT; 20	NED; 13	GER; 9	GBR; 8	CZE; 18	INP; 10	RSM; 15	POR; 8	AUS; 12	MAL; 14	VAL; 11				13th	70.5
2010	Moto2	Suter	QAT; 11	SPA; 13	FRA; 30	ITA; 16	GBR; 9	NED; 18	CAT; Ret	GER; 8	CZE; 16	INP; 11	RSM; 8	ARA; 7	JPN; 12	MAL; 8	AUS; 13	POR; 9	VAL; 9			15th	74
2011	Moto2	Suter	QAT; 13	SPA; 28	POR; 4	FRA; 8	CAT; Ret	GBR; 20	NED; 18	ITA; 11	GER; 12	CZE; 8	INP; 12	RSM; 13	ARA; 9	JPN; 8	AUS; 12	MAL; 5	VAL; 3			8th	94
2012	Moto2	Suter	QAT; 18	SPA; 8	POR; 12	FRA; 14	CAT; 7	GBR; 9	NED; 7	GER; 10	ITA; 8	INP; 7	CZE; 14	RSM; 6	ARA; 14	JPN; 10	MAL; 8	AUS; 4	VAL; 5			8th	114
2013	Moto2	Suter	QAT; 4	AME; 4	SPA; 8	FRA; 4	ITA; 10	CAT; 8	NED; 3	GER; 9	INP; 5	CZE; 13	GBR; 5	RSM; 5	ARA; 13	MAL; 5	AUS; 6	JPN; 8	VAL; 10			5th	158
2014	Moto2	Suter	QAT; Ret	AME; 3	ARG; 4	SPA; 2	FRA; 7	ITA; 5	CAT; 14	NED; 21	**GER**; 1	INP; 3	CZE; 5	GBR; 21	RSM; 6	ARA; 6	JPN; 18	AUS; 8	MAL; 5	VAL; 6		5th	172
2015	Moto2	Kalex	QAT; 15	AME; 18	ARG; 13	SPA; 16	FRA; 10	ITA; 3	CAT; 9	NED; 12	GER; 10	INP; 4	CZE; 13	GBR; 13	RSM; 24	ARA; Ret	JPN	AUS	MAL	VAL; WD		17th	62
2016	Moto2	Kalex	QAT; 5	ARG; 5	AME; 4	SPA; 8	FRA; 13	ITA; 10	CAT; Ret	NED; 9	GER; 10	AUT; 10	CZE; 17	GBR	RSM	ARA; 22	JPN	AUS	MAL	VAL		12th	71
2017	Moto2	Suter	QAT; 11	ARG; 14	AME; 5	SPA; 7	FRA; 6	ITA; 7	CAT; 16	NED; 12	GER; Ret	CZE; Ret	AUT; 9	GBR; 10	RSM; DSQ	ARA; 12	JPN; 9	AUS; 8	MAL; WD	VAL; 10		12th	88
2018	Moto2	KTM	QAT; 15	ARG; 8	AME; 9	SPA	FRA	ITA; 12	CAT; 20	NED; 14	GER; 14	CZE; 17	AUT; 17	GBR; C	RSM; 13	ARA; 21	THA; 16	JPN; 13	AUS; 6	MAL; 14	VAL; 11	17th	47
2019	Moto2	MV Agusta	QAT; 18	ARG; 20	AME; 14	SPA; 13	FRA; Ret	ITA; 17	CAT; 16	NED; 9	GER; 20	CZE; 21	AUT; 17	GBR; 18	RSM; 18	ARA; 19	THA; 16	JPN; 14	AUS; 27	MAL; 15	VAL; 12	22nd	19
2020	MotoE	Energica	SPA; 3	**ANC**; 1	RSM; 3	EMI1; 1	EMI2; 16	FRA1; 14	FRA2; 4													3rd	97
2020	Moto2	NTS	QAT	SPA	ANC	CZE; 21	AUT; 12	STY; Ret	RSM	EMI	CAT	FRA	ARA	TER	EUR	VAL; 20						28th	4
2021	MotoE	Energica	SPA; 2	FRA; 4	CAT; 2	NED; 18	AUT; 3	RSM1; 2	RSM2; 12													2nd	93
2022	MotoE	Energica	SPA1; 2	SPA2; 4	FRA1; 2	FRA2; 1	**ITA1**; 1	**ITA2**; 2	**NED1**; 1	**NED2**; 2^{‡}	AUT1; 2	AUT2; 3	**RSM1**; 2	**RSM2**; 4								1st	227

^{‡} Half points awarded as less than two thirds of the race distance (but at least three full laps) was completed.

=== Suzuka 8 Hours results ===
Year	Team	Co-riders	Bike	Pos
2014	(Japan) Team KAGAYAMA & Verity	(Japan) Yukio Kagayama (Japan) Noriyuki Haga	Suzuki GSX-R1000	3rd
2015	(Japan) F.C.C. TSR	(Australia) Joshua Hook (United Kingdom) Kyle Smith	Honda CBR1000RR	2nd
2016	(Japan) F.C.C. TSR	(United States) P. J. Jacobsen (Japan) Kazuma Watanabe	Honda CBR1000RR	18th
2017	(Japan) F.C.C. TSR	(France) Randy de Puniet (Australia) Joshua Hook	Honda CBR1000RR	3rd

=== FIM CEV Moto2 European Championship ===
==== Races by year ====
(key) (Races in bold indicate pole position, races in italics indicate fastest lap)

Year	Bike	1	2	3	4	5	6	7	8	9	10	11	Pos	Pts
2020	Kalex	EST1	EST2	POR1	POR2	JER1	JER2	ARA1	ARA2	ARA3	VAL1; 3	VAL2; 2	16th	36

=== Supersport World Championship ===
==== Races by year ====
(key) (Races in bold indicate pole position; races in italics indicate fastest lap)

Year	Bike	1	2	3	4	5	6	7	8	9	10	11	12	13	14	15	16	17	18	19	20	21	22	23	24	Pos	Pts
2021	Yamaha	SPA; 2	SPA; 5	POR; 4	POR; 1	**ITA**; 1	**ITA**; 1	**NED**; 1	**NED**; 1	CZE; 4	CZE; 1	**SPA**; 1	**SPA**; 1	FRA; 1	FRA; 2	SPA	SPA	SPA; C	SPA; 1	POR; 3	POR; 5	ARG; 5	ARG; 3	**INA**; 2	**INA**; 3	1st	417
2022	Yamaha	SPA; 2	SPA; 1	**NED**; 1	**NED**; 1	**POR**; 1	**POR**; 1	**ITA**; 1	**ITA**; 1	**GBR**; 1	**GBR**; 1	CZE; Ret	CZE; EX	FRA; 3	FRA; 1	**SPA**; 1	**SPA**; 1	**POR**; 4	**POR**; 1	**ARG**; 1	**ARG**; 1	INA; 4	INA; 1	AUS; 5	AUS; 1	1st	498
2026	Kawasaki	AUS; 23	AUS; Ret	POR; 11	POR; 18	NED; 6	NED; 15	HUN; 12	HUN; 15	CZE; 18	CZE; 12	ARA; 17	ARA; 18	EMI; 13	EMI; 13	GBR; 12	GBR; 14	FRA; 17	FRA; 15	ITA; 9	ITA; 12	EST; 24	EST; 8	SPA; 5	SPA; 2	15th	88

=== Superbike World Championship ===
==== By season ====
Season	Class	Team	Race	Win	Podium	Pole	FLap	Pts	Plcd
2023	Yamaha YZF-R1	GYTR GRT Yamaha WorldSBK Team	36	0	2	0	1	163	8th
2024	Yamaha YZF-R1	GYTR GRT Yamaha WorldSBK Team	27	0	0	0	0	91	16th
2025	Yamaha YZF-R1	GYTR GRT Yamaha WorldSBK Team	28	0	0	0	1	100	14th
Total			**91**	**0**	**2**	**0**	**2**	**354**	

==== Races by year ====
(key) (Races in bold indicate pole position) (Races in italics indicate fastest lap)

Year	Bike	1			2			3			4			5			6			7			8			9			10			11			12			Pos	Pts
Year	Bike	R1	SR	R2	R1	SR	R2	R1	SR	R2	R1	SR	R2	R1	SR	R2	R1	SR	R2	R1	SR	R2	R1	SR	R2	R1	SR	R2	R1	SR	R2	R1	SR	R2	R1	SR	R2	Pos	Pts
2023	Yamaha	AUS; 13	AUS; Ret	AUS; 7	INA; 8	INA; 10	INA; 12	NED; 6	NED; 7	NED; 4	SPA; 5	SPA; 6	SPA; 8	ITA; 6	ITA; 21	ITA; 11	GBR; 12	GBR; 11	GBR; 11	ITA; Ret	ITA; 14	ITA; 12	CZE; 8	CZE; 11	CZE; 11	FRA; 11	FRA; 6	FRA; Ret	SPA; 16	SPA; 14	SPA; 12	POR; 14	POR; 14	POR; 8	SPA; 18	SPA; 2	SPA; 3	8th	163
2024	Yamaha	AUS; 6	AUS; 7	AUS; 12	SPA; 8	SPA; 10	SPA; 9	NED; 13	NED; 14	NED; 7	ITA; Ret	ITA; 10	ITA; Ret	GBR; 8	GBR; 11	GBR; 9	CZE; 13	CZE; 18	CZE; 16	POR; 9	POR; 8	POR; 10	FRA	FRA	FRA	ITA	ITA	ITA	SPA	SPA	SPA	POR; 14	POR; 16	POR; 13	SPA; 9	SPA; 10	SPA; Ret	16th	91
2025	Yamaha	AUS; 12	AUS; 11	AUS; 12	POR; 8	POR; 14	POR; 9	NED; 7	NED; 17	NED; 10	ITA; 13	ITA; 13	ITA; 19	CZE; 13	CZE; 19	CZE; 11	ITA; Ret	ITA; DNS	ITA; DNS	GBR; 7	GBR; 10	GBR; 8	HUN; 12	HUN; 11	HUN; 8	FRA; 8	FRA; 10	FRA; 10	SPA; 11	SPA; 20	SPA; 13	POR	POR	POR	SPA	SPA	SPA	14th	100

=== IDM Championship ===
==== By year ====
(key) (Races in bold indicate pole position; races in italics indicate fastest lap)

Year	Class	Bike	1		2		3		4		5		6		7		Pos	Pts
Year	Class	Bike	R1	R2	R1	R2	R1	R2	R1	R2	R1	R2	R1	R2	R1	R2	Pos	Pts
2025	Superbike	Yamaha	OSC	OSC	SCH	SCH	CZE	CZE	OSC	OSC	NED; 1	NED; 2	NÜR	NÜR	HOC	HOC	NC	NA
