= 2010 French motorcycle Grand Prix =

3rd round of the 2010 FIM Road Racing World Championship season

(France) 2010 French Grand Prix
Race details
- Race 3 of 18 races in the 2010 Grand Prix motorcycle racing season
- Date: 23 May 2010
- Official name: Monster Energy Grand Prix de France
- Location: Bugatti Circuit
- Course: Permanent racing facility; 4.185 km (2.600 mi)

MotoGP
Pole position
- Rider: (Italy) Valentino Rossi
- Time: 1:33.408
Fastest lap
- Rider: (Spain) Jorge Lorenzo
- Time: 1:34.545
Podium
- First: (Spain) Jorge Lorenzo
- Second: (Italy) Valentino Rossi
- Third: (Italy) Andrea Dovizioso

Moto2
Pole position
- Rider: (United States) Kenny Noyes
- Time: 1:39.234
Fastest lap
- Rider: (France) Jules Cluzel
- Time: 1:39.169
Podium
- First: (Spain) Toni Elías
- Second: (Spain) Julián Simón
- Third: (Italy) Simone Corsi

125cc
Pole position
- Rider: (Spain) Nicolás Terol
- Time: 1:43.719
Fastest lap
- Rider: (Spain) Marc Márquez
- Time: 1:43.787
Podium
- First: (Spain) Pol Espargaró
- Second: (Spain) Nicolás Terol
- Third: (Spain) Marc Márquez

The 2010 French motorcycle Grand Prix, officially the Monster Energy Grand Prix de France, was the third round of the 2010 Grand Prix motorcycle racing season. It took place on the weekend of 21–23 May 2010 at the Bugatti Circuit in Le Mans, France. From second on the grid, Jorge Lorenzo overhauled Valentino Rossi who was runner-up, to take the first back-to-back wins of his career.

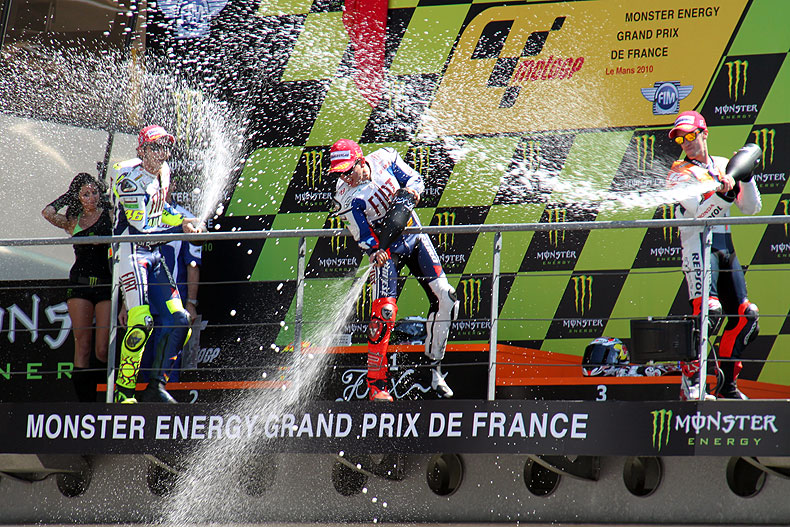
Valentino Rossi, Jorge Lorenzo and Andrea Dovizioso, spraying the champagne on the podium after finishing second, first and third in the MotoGP race.

== MotoGP classification ==
Pos.	No.	Rider	Team	Manufacturer	Laps	Time/Retired	Grid	Points
1	99	(Spain) Jorge Lorenzo	Fiat Yamaha Team	Yamaha	28	44:29.114	2	25
2	46	(Italy) Valentino Rossi	Fiat Yamaha Team	Yamaha	28	+5.672	1	20
3	4	(Italy) Andrea Dovizioso	Repsol Honda Team	Honda	28	+7.872	7	16
4	69	(United States) Nicky Hayden	Ducati Marlboro Team	Ducati	28	+9.346	5	13
5	26	(Spain) Dani Pedrosa	Repsol Honda Team	Honda	28	+12.613	3	11
6	33	(Italy) Marco Melandri	San Carlo Honda Gresini	Honda	28	+21.918	11	10
7	14	(France) Randy de Puniet	LCR Honda MotoGP	Honda	28	+29.288	6	9
8	40	(Spain) Héctor Barberá	Páginas Amarillas Aspar	Ducati	28	+33.128	15	8
9	41	(Spain) Aleix Espargaró	Pramac Racing Team	Ducati	28	+33.493	10	7
10	58	(Italy) Marco Simoncelli	San Carlo Honda Gresini	Honda	28	+33.805	13	6
11	7	(Japan) Hiroshi Aoyama	Interwetten Honda MotoGP	Honda	28	+34.346	14	5
12	5	(United States) Colin Edwards	Monster Yamaha Tech 3	Yamaha	28	+37.123	8	4
13	36	(Finland) Mika Kallio	Pramac Racing Team	Ducati	28	+55.061	16	3
Ret	65	(Italy) Loris Capirossi	Rizla Suzuki MotoGP	Suzuki	6	Retirement	9	
Ret	11	(United States) Ben Spies	Monster Yamaha Tech 3	Yamaha	6	Accident	12	
Ret	27	(Australia) Casey Stoner	Ducati Marlboro Team	Ducati	2	Accident	4	
DNS	19	(Spain) Álvaro Bautista	Rizla Suzuki MotoGP	Suzuki		Did not start		

== Moto2 classification ==
Pos.	No.	Rider	Manufacturer	Laps	Time/Retired	Grid	Points
1	24	(Spain) Toni Elías	Moriwaki	26	43:29.277	7	25
2	60	(Spain) Julián Simón	Suter	26	+1.336	9	20
3	3	(Italy) Simone Corsi	Motobi	26	+2.831	8	16
4	29	(Italy) Andrea Iannone	Speed Up	26	+4.880	14	13
5	2	(Hungary) Gábor Talmácsi	Speed Up	26	+13.293	19	11
6	40	(Spain) Sergio Gadea	Pons Kalex	26	+13.415	6	10
7	14	(Thailand) Ratthapark Wilairot	Bimota	26	+14.294	12	9
8	10	(Spain) Fonsi Nieto	Moriwaki	26	+14.554	5	8
9	65	(Germany) Stefan Bradl	Suter	26	+23.503	35	7
10	44	(Italy) Roberto Rolfo	Suter	26	+23.687	10	6
11	45	(United Kingdom) Scott Redding	Suter	26	+23.959	21	5
12	68	(Colombia) Yonny Hernández	BQR-Moto2	26	+24.955	24	4
13	52	(Czech Republic) Lukáš Pešek	Moriwaki	26	+25.068	22	3
14	25	(Italy) Alex Baldolini	I.C.P.	26	+26.023	28	2
15	71	(Italy) Claudio Corti	Suter	26	+28.765	13	1
16	6	(Spain) Alex Debón	FTR	26	+32.240	3	
17	59	(Italy) Niccolò Canepa	Force GP210	26	+33.607	18	
18	41	(Germany) Arne Tode	Suter	26	+34.789	26	
19	12	(Switzerland) Thomas Lüthi	Moriwaki	26	+43.180	17	
20	63	(France) Mike Di Meglio	Suter	26	+43.522	29	
21	61	(Ukraine) Vladimir Ivanov	Moriwaki	26	+47.761	34	
22	53	(France) Valentin Debise	ADV	26	+51.571	38	
23	39	(Venezuela) Robertino Pietri	Suter	26	+59.692	33	
24	5	(Spain) Joan Olivé	Promoharris	26	+59.939	37	
25	88	(Spain) Yannick Guerra	Moriwaki	26	+1:07.377	40	
26	8	(Australia) Anthony West	MZ-RE Honda	26	+1:16.171	32	
27	21	(Russia) Vladimir Leonov	Suter	26	+1:16.528	41	
28	95	(Qatar) Mashel Al Naimi	BQR-Moto2	26	+1:20.977	39	
29	76	(Spain) Bernat Martínez	Bimota	26	+1:22.982	36	
30	77	(Switzerland) Dominique Aegerter	Suter	24	+2 laps	30	
Ret	55	(Spain) Héctor Faubel	Suter	16	Retirement	27	
Ret	75	(Italy) Mattia Pasini	Motobi	7	Collision	31	
Ret	48	(Japan) Shoya Tomizawa	Suter	7	Collision	15	
Ret	16	(France) Jules Cluzel	Suter	6	Accident	4	
Ret	19	(Belgium) Xavier Siméon	Moriwaki	6	Accident	11	
Ret	15	(San Marino) Alex de Angelis	Force GP210	6	Collision	16	
Ret	35	(Italy) Raffaele De Rosa	Tech 3	5	Accident	20	
Ret	80	(Spain) Axel Pons	Pons Kalex	5	Mechanical	23	
Ret	9	(United States) Kenny Noyes	Promoharris	4	Accident	1	
Ret	72	(Japan) Yuki Takahashi	Tech 3	4	Accident	2	
Ret	17	(Czech Republic) Karel Abraham	FTR	1	Collision	25	
OFFICIAL MOTO2 REPORT

== 125 cc classification ==
Pos.	No.	Rider	Manufacturer	Laps	Time/Retired	Grid	Points
1	44	(Spain) Pol Espargaró	Derbi	24	41:52.280	2	25
2	40	(Spain) Nicolás Terol	Aprilia	24	+0.957	1	20
3	93	(Spain) Marc Márquez	Derbi	24	+4.428	4	16
4	7	(Spain) Efrén Vázquez	Derbi	24	+4.736	12	13
5	38	(United Kingdom) Bradley Smith	Aprilia	24	+5.143	5	11
6	11	(Germany) Sandro Cortese	Derbi	24	+5.847	3	10
7	12	(Spain) Esteve Rabat	Aprilia	24	+11.047	10	9
8	71	(Japan) Tomoyoshi Koyama	Aprilia	24	+11.165	6	8
9	99	(United Kingdom) Danny Webb	Aprilia	24	+37.808	8	7
10	39	(Spain) Luis Salom	Aprilia	24	+39.585	11	6
11	14	(France) Johann Zarco	Aprilia	24	+40.519	9	5
12	53	(Netherlands) Jasper Iwema	Aprilia	24	+40.817	15	4
13	94	(Germany) Jonas Folger	Aprilia	24	+42.149	13	3
14	35	(Switzerland) Randy Krummenacher	Aprilia	24	+44.741	7	2
15	26	(Spain) Adrián Martín	Aprilia	24	+46.320	16	1
16	5	(France) Alexis Masbou	Aprilia	24	+46.503	18	
17	23	(Spain) Alberto Moncayo	Aprilia	24	+46.979	17	
18	78	(Germany) Marcel Schrötter	Honda	24	+59.626	20	
19	84	(Czech Republic) Jakub Kornfeil	Aprilia	24	+59.770	23	
20	50	(Norway) Sturla Fagerhaug	Aprilia	24	+1:04.405	21	
21	69	(France) Louis Rossi	Aprilia	24	+1:05.731	22	
22	60	(Netherlands) Michael van der Mark	Lambretta	24	+1:28.928	25	
23	82	(France) Kévin Szalaï	Honda	24	+1:47.143	28	
24	81	(France) Grégory Di Carlo	Honda	23	+1 lap	27	
25	63	(Malaysia) Zulfahmi Khairuddin	Aprilia	23	+1 lap	24	
26	83	(France) Morgan Berchet	Honda	23	+1 lap	26	
Ret	72	(Italy) Marco Ravaioli	Lambretta	18	Retirement	29	
Ret	51	(Italy) Riccardo Moretti	Aprilia	16	Retirement	14	
Ret	32	(Italy) Lorenzo Savadori	Aprilia	6	Accident	19	
OFFICIAL 125CC REPORT

== Championship standings after the race (MotoGP) ==
Below are the standings for the top five riders and constructors after round three has concluded.

Riders' Championship standings

Pos.	Rider	Points
1	(Spain) Jorge Lorenzo	70
2	(Italy) Valentino Rossi	61
3	(Italy) Andrea Dovizioso	42
4	(Spain) Dani Pedrosa	40
5	(United States) Nicky Hayden	39

Constructors' Championship standings

Pos.	Constructor	Points
1	(Japan) Yamaha	75
2	(Japan) Honda	52
3	(Italy) Ducati	39
4	(Japan) Suzuki	13

- Note: Only the top five positions are included for both sets of standings.

Previous race: 2010 Spanish Grand Prix	FIM Grand Prix World Championship; 2010 season	Next race: 2010 Italian Grand Prix
Previous race: 2009 French Grand Prix	French motorcycle Grand Prix	Next race: 2011 French Grand Prix
