= Alessio Perilli =

Italian motorcycle racer (1983–2004)

- Nationality: Italian
- Born: December 30, 1983; Rome, Italy
- Died: September 5, 2004 (aged 20); Assen, Netherlands

Alessio Perilli (December 30, 1983 – September 5, 2004) was an Italian motorcycle road racer. He was killed in a crash during a European Superstock Championship race at TT Circuit Assen on 5 September 2004. He was 20 years old. He scored four points in the season, reaching the 30th final position.

== Career statistics ==
2004 - 30th, Superstock European Championship, Honda CBR1000RR Yamaha YZF-R1

=== Superstock European Championship ===
==== Races by year ====
(key) (Races in bold indicate pole position) (Races in italics indicate fastest lap)

Year	Bike	1	2	3	4	5	6	7	8	9	Pos	Pts
2004	Honda/Yamaha	VAL; 19	SMR; 26	MNZ; Ret	OSC; 22	SIL; 14	BRA; 17	NED; 14	IMO	MAG	30th	4
