= 2010 Dutch TT =

6th round of the 2010 FIM Road Racing World Championship season

(Netherlands) 2010 Dutch Grand Prix
Race details
- Race 6 of 17 races in the 2010 Grand Prix motorcycle racing season
- Date: 26 June 2010
- Official name: TIM TT Assen
- Location: TT Circuit Assen
- Course: Permanent racing facility; 4.542 km (2.822 mi)

MotoGP
Pole position
- Rider: (Spain) Jorge Lorenzo
- Time: 1:34.515
Fastest lap
- Rider: (Spain) Dani Pedrosa
- Time: 1:34.525
Podium
- First: (Spain) Jorge Lorenzo
- Second: (Spain) Dani Pedrosa
- Third: (Australia) Casey Stoner

Moto2
Pole position
- Rider: (Italy) Andrea Iannone
- Time: 1:39.092
Fastest lap
- Rider: (Italy) Andrea Iannone
- Time: 1:38.917
Podium
- First: (Italy) Andrea Iannone
- Second: (Spain) Toni Elías
- Third: (Switzerland) Thomas Lüthi

125cc
Pole position
- Rider: (Spain) Marc Márquez
- Time: 1:42.191
Fastest lap
- Rider: (Spain) Nicolás Terol
- Time: 1:42.428
Podium
- First: (Spain) Marc Márquez
- Second: (Spain) Nicolás Terol
- Third: (Spain) Pol Espargaró

The 2010 Dutch TT was the sixth round of the 2010 Grand Prix motorcycle racing season. It took place on the weekend of 24–26 June 2010 at the TT Circuit Assen.

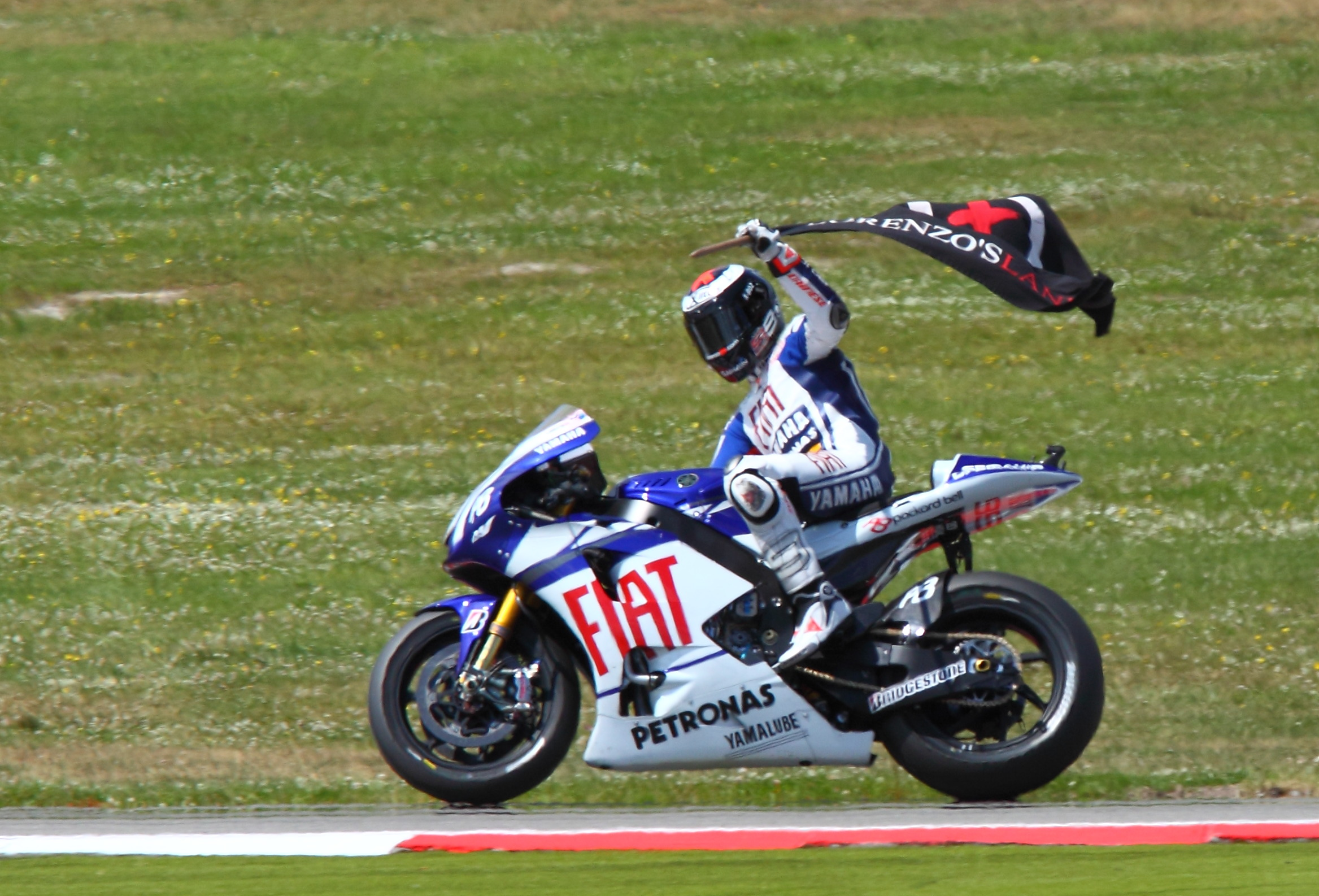
Jorge Lorenzo, celebrating with his flag after winning the MotoGP race.

== MotoGP classification ==
Pos.	No.	Rider	Team	Manufacturer	Laps	Time/Retired	Grid	Points
1	99	(Spain) Jorge Lorenzo	Fiat Yamaha Team	Yamaha	26	41:18.629	1	25
2	26	(Spain) Dani Pedrosa	Repsol Honda Team	Honda	26	+2.935	7	20
3	27	(Australia) Casey Stoner	Ducati Team	Ducati	26	+7.022	3	16
4	11	(United States) Ben Spies	Monster Yamaha Tech 3	Yamaha	26	+13.265	4	13
5	4	(Italy) Andrea Dovizioso	Repsol Honda Team	Honda	26	+15.323	6	11
6	14	(France) Randy de Puniet	LCR Honda MotoGP	Honda	26	+15.772	2	10
7	69	(United States) Nicky Hayden	Ducati Team	Ducati	26	+25.867	5	9
8	5	(United States) Colin Edwards	Monster Yamaha Tech 3	Yamaha	26	+28.991	9	8
9	58	(Italy) Marco Simoncelli	San Carlo Honda Gresini	Honda	26	+35.658	8	7
10	41	(Spain) Aleix Espargaró	Pramac Racing Team	Ducati	26	+35.837	10	6
11	36	(Finland) Mika Kallio	Pramac Racing Team	Ducati	26	+56.769	13	5
12	40	(Spain) Héctor Barberá	Páginas Amarillas Aspar	Ducati	26	+56.890	14	4
13	65	(Italy) Loris Capirossi	Rizla Suzuki MotoGP	Suzuki	26	+1:00.615	11	3
14	19	(Spain) Álvaro Bautista	Rizla Suzuki MotoGP	Suzuki	26	+1:08.074	12	2
15	64	(Japan) Kousuke Akiyoshi	Interwetten Honda MotoGP	Honda	25	+1 lap	15	1
DNS	33	(Italy) Marco Melandri	San Carlo Honda Gresini	Honda		Did not start		

== Moto2 classification ==
Pos.	No.	Rider	Manufacturer	Laps	Time/Retired	Grid	Points
1	29	(Italy) Andrea Iannone	Speed Up	24	40:00.383	1	25
2	24	(Spain) Toni Elías	Moriwaki	24	+4.492	5	20
3	12	(Switzerland) Thomas Lüthi	Moriwaki	24	+5.390	4	16
4	14	(Thailand) Ratthapark Wilairot	Bimota	24	+5.473	2	13
5	48	(Japan) Shoya Tomizawa	Suter	24	+7.405	3	11
6	60	(Spain) Julián Simón	Suter	24	+7.666	6	10
7	16	(France) Jules Cluzel	Suter	24	+16.023	9	9
8	63	(France) Mike Di Meglio	Suter	24	+16.122	16	8
9	17	(Czech Republic) Karel Abraham	FTR	24	+16.959	11	7
10	72	(Japan) Yuki Takahashi	Tech 3	24	+19.601	12	6
11	45	(United Kingdom) Scott Redding	Suter	24	+20.187	19	5
12	3	(Italy) Simone Corsi	Motobi	24	+20.423	18	4
13	2	(Hungary) Gábor Talmácsi	Speed Up	24	+21.358	22	3
14	75	(Italy) Mattia Pasini	Motobi	24	+26.654	14	2
15	68	(Colombia) Yonny Hernández	BQR-Moto2	24	+34.024	21	1
16	25	(Italy) Alex Baldolini	I.C.P.	24	+34.045	27	
17	71	(Italy) Claudio Corti	Suter	24	+34.377	8	
18	77	(Switzerland) Dominique Aegerter	Suter	24	+34.481	31	
19	65	(Germany) Stefan Bradl	Suter	24	+37.283	15	
20	15	(San Marino) Alex de Angelis	Force GP210	24	+42.525	25	
21	61	(Ukraine) Vladimir Ivanov	Moriwaki	24	+43.395	28	
22	9	(United States) Kenny Noyes	Promoharris	24	+46.784	32	
23	40	(Spain) Sergio Gadea	Pons Kalex	24	+46.796	24	
24	59	(Italy) Niccolò Canepa	Force GP210	24	+59.324	30	
25	55	(Spain) Héctor Faubel	Suter	24	+1:00.168	33	
26	39	(Venezuela) Robertino Pietri	Suter	24	+1:01.868	34	
27	35	(Italy) Raffaele De Rosa	Tech 3	24	+1:02.451	26	
28	76	(Spain) Bernat Martínez	Bimota	24	+1:07.317	37	
29	21	(Russia) Vladimir Leonov	Suter	24	+1:10.107	36	
30	53	(France) Valentin Debise	ADV	24	+1:37.619	23	
31	95	(Qatar) Mashel Al Naimi	BQR-Moto2	24	+1:41.035	38	
32	5	(Spain) Joan Olivé	Promoharris	24	+1:41.545	35	
Ret	19	(Belgium) Xavier Siméon	Moriwaki	23	Accident	29	
Ret	52	(Czech Republic) Lukáš Pešek	Moriwaki	16	Retirement	10	
Ret	41	(Germany) Arne Tode	Suter	15	Retirement	20	
Ret	44	(Italy) Roberto Rolfo	Suter	14	Retirement	13	
Ret	8	(Australia) Anthony West	MZ-RE Honda	10	Retirement	17	
Ret	10	(Spain) Fonsi Nieto	Moriwaki	7	Retirement	7	
DNS	6	(Spain) Alex Debón	FTR		Did not start		
DNS	80	(Spain) Axel Pons	Pons Kalex		Did not start		
OFFICIAL MOTO2 REPORT

== 125 cc classification ==
Pos.	No.	Rider	Manufacturer	Laps	Time/Retired	Grid	Points
1	93	(Spain) Marc Márquez	Derbi	22	37:48.923	1	25
2	40	(Spain) Nicolás Terol	Aprilia	22	+2.332	3	20
3	44	(Spain) Pol Espargaró	Derbi	22	+8.134	4	16
4	38	(United Kingdom) Bradley Smith	Aprilia	22	+9.636	2	13
5	11	(Germany) Sandro Cortese	Derbi	22	+36.961	5	11
6	35	(Switzerland) Randy Krummenacher	Aprilia	22	+39.091	12	10
7	99	(United Kingdom) Danny Webb	Aprilia	22	+39.397	11	9
8	39	(Spain) Luis Salom	Aprilia	22	+45.010	15	8
9	15	(Italy) Simone Grotzkyj	Aprilia	22	+45.672	10	7
10	94	(Germany) Jonas Folger	Aprilia	22	+48.031	32	6
11	23	(Spain) Alberto Moncayo	Aprilia	22	+48.457	9	5
12	14	(France) Johann Zarco	Aprilia	22	+48.833	17	4
13	53	(Netherlands) Jasper Iwema	Aprilia	22	+54.208	6	3
14	71	(Japan) Tomoyoshi Koyama	Aprilia	22	+59.055	14	2
15	84	(Czech Republic) Jakub Kornfeil	Aprilia	22	+1:01.504	16	1
16	26	(Spain) Adrián Martín	Aprilia	22	+1:16.069	20	
17	50	(Norway) Sturla Fagerhaug	Aprilia	22	+1:16.175	19	
18	78	(Germany) Marcel Schrötter	Honda	22	+1:18.029	18	
19	69	(France) Louis Rossi	Aprilia	22	+1:21.738	21	
20	68	(Germany) Toni Finsterbusch	KTM	22	+1:36.263	22	
21	60	(Netherlands) Michael van der Mark	Lambretta	22	+1:36.445	24	
22	63	(Malaysia) Zulfahmi Khairuddin	Aprilia	22	+1:40.681	25	
23	66	(Netherlands) Pepijn Bijsterbosch	Honda	21	+1 lap	30	
24	64	(Netherlands) Ernst Dubbink	Honda	21	+1 lap	28	
Ret	5	(France) Alexis Masbou	Aprilia	20	Accident	13	
Ret	67	(Netherlands) Jerry van de Bunt	Honda	16	Retirement	29	
Ret	65	(Netherlands) Roy Pouw	Aprilia	14	Retirement	31	
Ret	72	(Italy) Marco Ravaioli	Lambretta	11	Accident	27	
Ret	87	(Italy) Luca Marconi	Aprilia	8	Accident	23	
Ret	12	(Spain) Esteve Rabat	Aprilia	4	Accident	8	
Ret	7	(Spain) Efrén Vázquez	Derbi	3	Accident	7	
Ret	32	(Italy) Lorenzo Savadori	Aprilia	0	Accident	26	
OFFICIAL 125CC REPORT

== Championship standings after the race (MotoGP) ==
Below are the standings for the top five riders and constructors after round six has concluded.

Riders' Championship standings

Pos.	Rider	Points
1	(Spain) Jorge Lorenzo	140
2	(Spain) Dani Pedrosa	93
3	(Italy) Andrea Dovizioso	89
4	(Italy) Valentino Rossi	61
5	(United States) Nicky Hayden	61

Constructors' Championship standings

Pos.	Constructor	Points
1	(Japan) Yamaha	145
2	(Japan) Honda	117
3	(Italy) Ducati	81
4	(Japan) Suzuki	26

- Note: Only the top five positions are included for both sets of standings.

Previous race: 2010 British Grand Prix	FIM Grand Prix World Championship; 2010 season	Next race: 2010 Catalan Grand Prix
Previous race: 2009 Dutch TT	Dutch TT	Next race: 2011 Dutch TT
