= 2004 Superstock European Championship =

2004 FIM Superstock 1000 Cup
Previous:	2003	Next:	2005
Support series: Superbike World Championship; Supersport World Championship

The 2004 Superstock European Championship was the sixth season of the FIM Superstock championship, the last time held under this name. The FIM Superstock European Championship followed the same calendar as the Superbike World Championship, missing out the none European rounds of the championship. Starting on 29 February in Circuit Ricardo Tormo and ending on 3 October in Circuit de Nevers Magny-Cours.

Lorenzo Alfonsi won the title after beating closest rival Gianluca Vizziello.

== Race calendar and results ==
2004 Calendar
Round	Date	Round	Circuit	Pole position	Fastest lap	Race winner	Winning team
1	29 February	Spain	Valencia	(Italy) Gianluca Vizziello	(Italy) Lorenzo Alfonsi	(Italy) Gianluca Vizziello	Italia Lorenzini by Leoni
2	18 April	San Marino	Misano Adriatico	(Italy) Alessandro Polita	(Italy) Alessandro Polita	(Italy) Lorenzo Alfonsi	Italia Lorenzini by Leoni
3	16 May	Italy	Monza	(Italy) Gianluca Vizziello	(Italy) Gianluca Vizziello	(Italy) Gianluca Vizziello	Italia Lorenzini by Leoni
4	30 May	Germany	Oschersleben	(Italy) Gianluca Vizziello	(Belgium) Didier Van Keymeulen	(Italy) Gianluca Vizziello	Italia Lorenzini by Leoni
5	13 June	(United Kingdom) Great Britain	Silverstone	(Belgium) Didier Van Keymeulen	(Italy) Gianluca Vizziello	(Italy) Lorenzo Alfonsi	Italia Lorenzini by Leoni
6	1 August	Europe	Brands Hatch	(Italy) Gianluca Vizziello	(Italy) Gianluca Vizziello	(Italy) Gianluca Vizziello	Italia Lorenzini by Leoni
7	5 September	Netherlands	Assen	(Italy) Gianluca Vizziello	(Belgium) Didier Van Keymeulen	(Italy) Lorenzo Alfonsi	Italia Lorenzini by Leoni
8	26 September	Italy	Imola	(Italy) Riccardo Chiarello	(Italy) Riccardo Chiarello	(Italy) Riccardo Chiarello	Suzuki Alstare Corona Extra
9	3 October	France	Magny-Cours	(Italy) Lorenzo Alfonsi	(Belgium) Didier Van Keymeulen	(Italy) Lorenzo Alfonsi	Italia Lorenzini by Leoni

== Entry list ==
Team	Constructor	Motorcycle	No.	Rider	Rounds
FbC Racing - Spamoto	Aprilia	Aprilia RSV 1000	44	(Italy) Alessandro Brannetti	1–5, 7–9
DFXtreme Strilgarda	Ducati	Ducati 999S	6	(China) Chow Ho-Wan	1
EVR Corse Biassono R.T.	Ducati	Ducati 999S	86	(Italy) Ayrton Badovini	All
EVR Corse Biassono R.T.	Ducati	Ducati 999S	93	(Australia) David Butler	1–6, 8–9
MCT–Sitra	Ducati	Ducati 999S	75	(Netherlands) Ghisbert Van Ginhoven	3–7, 9
MCT–Sitra	Ducati	Ducati 999S	77	(Belgium) Nicolas Saelens	1–7, 9
PSG–1 Corse	Ducati	Ducati 999S	35	(Italy) Christian Dal Corso	All
Rox Racing	Ducati	Ducati 999S	37	(San Marino) William De Angelis	All
Rox Racing	Ducati	Ducati 999S	53	(Italy) Alessandro Polita	All
AKUNA Racing Team	Honda	Honda CBR1000RR	60	(United Kingdom) Barry Burrell	7–9
AKUNA Racing Team	Honda	Honda CBR1000RR	61	(United Kingdom) Richard Cooper	7–9
AKUNA Racing Team	Honda	Honda CBR1000RR	88	(Czech Republic) Černý Jaroslav	1–2
AKUNA Racing Team	Honda	Honda CBR1000RR	89	(Czech Republic) Jiří Kadeřábek	3–5
AKUNA Racing Team	Honda	Honda CBR1000RR	96	(Czech Republic) Matěj Smrž	1–2
AKUNA Racing Team	Honda	Honda CBR1000RR	97	(Czech Republic) Tomas Holubec	4–5
Bike World Racing	Honda	Honda CBR1000RR	41	(Estonia) Risto Klausen	1, 3–7
Bucek Racing	Honda	Honda CBR1000RR	85	(Slovakia) Libor Buček	1–4
DUCCI - I.T. Networks F.R.	Honda	Honda CBR1000RR	52	(Italy) Alessio Perilli	1–4
Intermoto Czech Republic	Honda	Honda CBR1000RR	21	(Spain) Alex Martinez	1–5
Intermoto Czech Republic	Honda	Honda CBR1000RR	58	(Czech Republic) Tomáš Mikšovský	All
IRT Honda Israel	Honda	Honda CBR1000RR	94	(Israel) Yaron Salinger	3–9
Kawasaki Bertocchi	Kawasaki	Kawasaki ZX-10R	16	(Spain) Enrique Rocamora	1–6
Kawasaki Bertocchi	Kawasaki	Kawasaki ZX-10R	59	(Italy) Niccolò Canepa	7–9
Intermoto Czech Republic	Kawasaki	Kawasaki ZX-10R	21	(Spain) Alex Martinez	6–9
Ormeni Racing	Kawasaki	Kawasaki ZX-10R	9	(Italy) Luca Scassa	All
Association Plein Gaz	Suzuki	Suzuki GSX 1000R	15	(France) Pierrot Vanstaen	1–7
Association Plein Gaz	Suzuki	Suzuki GSX 1000R	83	(France) David Fouloi	8–9
Beowulf World	Suzuki	Suzuki GSX 1000R	27	(United Kingdom) David Gatenby	1–2
Beowulf World	Suzuki	Suzuki GSX 1000R	29	(United Kingdom) Benjie Cockerill	6–9
Beowulf World	Suzuki	Suzuki GSX 1000R	72	(United Kingdom) Dennis Hobbs	3–4
Bernat Marvimoto	Suzuki	Suzuki GSX 1000R	76	(Spain) Bernat Martinez	1, 5–6, 9
Celani - Suzuki Italia	Suzuki	Suzuki GSX 1000R	57	(Italy) Ilario Dionisi	All
EMS Racing	Suzuki	Suzuki GSX 1000R	14	(Republic of Ireland) John Laverty	1–4
Herman Verboven Racing	Suzuki	Suzuki GSX 1000R	22	(Belgium) Leroy Verboven	All
Herman Verboven Racing	Suzuki	Suzuki GSX 1000R	26	(Belgium) Tom Van Looy	All
MIR Racing	Suzuki	Suzuki GSX 1000R	34	(Spain) Jose Manuel Hurtado	All
MIR Racing	Suzuki	Suzuki GSX 1000R	99	(Spain) Jose Lombardo	All
MNR Racing	Suzuki	Suzuki GSX 1000R	7	(Italy) Fabrizio De Noni	All
MNR Racing	Suzuki	Suzuki GSX 1000R	16	(Spain) Enrique Rocamora	7–9
MNR Racing	Suzuki	Suzuki GSX 1000R	79	(Italy) Stefano Bianco	1–4, 6
Sepp Racing - Dirk Van Mol	Suzuki	Suzuki GSX 1000R	28	(Belgium) Sepp Vermonden	All
Suzuki Alstare Corona Extra	Suzuki	Suzuki GSX 1000R	5	(Italy) Riccardo Chiarello	All
Suzuki Alstare Corona Extra	Suzuki	Suzuki GSX 1000R	31	(Italy) Vittorio Iannuzzo	8–9
Titano Corse	Suzuki	Suzuki GSX 1000R	80	(Italy) Roberto Lunadei	2–3
TKR Racing Team	Suzuki	Suzuki GSX 1000R	81	(Switzerland) Marc Wildisen	4
Vivaldi Racing	Suzuki	Suzuki GSX 1000R	82	(United Kingdom) Ben Wilson	5
Yohann Moto Sport	Suzuki	Suzuki GSX 1000R	95	(France) Cédric Tangre	9
CRT Yamaha	Yamaha	Yamaha YZF-R1	78	(Netherlands) Robert De Vries	All
Bernat Marvimoto	Yamaha	Yamaha YZF-R1	76	(Spain) Bernat Martinez	2–4, 7
Bill Smith Motors	Yamaha	Yamaha YZF-R1	13	(United Kingdom) Howie Mainwaring	6
DUCCI - I.T. Networks F.R.	Yamaha	Yamaha YZF-R1	52	(Italy) Alessio Perilli	5–7
EMS Racing	Yamaha	Yamaha YZF-R1	14	(Republic of Ireland) John Laverty	5–9
Hartelman Racing	Yamaha	Yamaha YZF-R1	63	(Netherlands) Bob Withag	7
Italia Lorenzini by Leoni	Yamaha	Yamaha YZF-R1	4	(Italy) Lorenzo Alfonsi	All
Italia Lorenzini by Leoni	Yamaha	Yamaha YZF-R1	45	(Italy) Gianluca Vizziello	All
Italia Lorenzini by Leoni	Yamaha	Yamaha YZF-R1	55	(Italy) Massimo Roccoli	8
LaGlisse	Yamaha	Yamaha YZF-R1	74	(Spain) Iván Silva	1
Yamaha Motor Germany	Yamaha	Yamaha YZF-R1	54	(Turkey) Kenan Sofuoğlu	All
Yamaha Motor Germany	Yamaha	Yamaha YZF-R1	69	(Belgium) Didier Van Keymeulen	All
Zone Rouge	Yamaha	Yamaha YZF-R1	48	(Belgium) Gregory Fastre	All

Key
Regular rider
Wildcard rider
Replacement rider

- All entries used Pirelli tyres.

== Championship' standings ==
=== Riders' standings ===
Pos	Rider	Bike	VAL (Spain)	MIS (San Marino)	MNZ (Italy)	OSC (Germany)	SIL (United Kingdom)	BRA (Europe)	ASS (Netherlands)	IMO (Italy)	MAG (France)	Pts
1	(Italy) Lorenzo Alfonsi	Yamaha	2	1	2	7	1	2	1	21	**1**	169
2	(Italy) Gianluca Vizziello	Yamaha	**1**	2	**1**	**1**	2	**1**	**2**	WD	WD	160
3	(Turkey) Kenan Sofuoğlu	Yamaha	6	15	7	3	16	3	3	2	3	104
4	(Belgium) Didier Van Keymeulen	Yamaha	Ret	4	3	2	**Ret**	DNS	5	6	2	90
5	(Italy) Riccardo Chiarello	Suzuki	3	23	Ret	5	4	5	4	**1**	Ret	89
6	(Italy) Ilario Dionisi	Suzuki	18	Ret	4	8	3	4	Ret	7	6	69
7	(Italy) Luca Scassa	Kawasaki	7	6	Ret	16	6	7	10	3	7	69
8	(Republic of Ireland) John Laverty	Suzuki	13	21	6	10						60
8	(Republic of Ireland) John Laverty	Yamaha					Ret	8	9	4	4	60
9	(Italy) Alessandro Polita	Ducati	DNS	**3**	Ret	9	Ret	10	7	8	12	50
10	(Spain) Enrique Rocamora	Kawasaki	5	10	8	6	Ret	11				50
10	(Spain) Enrique Rocamora	Suzuki							6	DSQ	17	50
11	(Spain) Bernat Martinez	Suzuki	Ret				5	9			WD	47
11	(Spain) Bernat Martinez	Yamaha		11	5	4			Ret			47
12	(Spain) Alex Martinez	Honda	14	8	DNQ	Ret	9					42
12	(Spain) Alex Martinez	Kawasaki						6	8	9	Ret	42
13	(San Marino) William De Angelis	Ducati	12	14	9	11	10	14	21	14	15	29
14	(Spain) Jose Manuel Hurtado	Suzuki	9	20	13	Ret	7	Ret	15	15	9	28
15	(Italy) Alessandro Brannetti	Aprilia	Ret	7	DSQ	Ret	Ret		19	10	10	21
16	(Czech Republic) Tomáš Mikšovský	Honda	15	18	EX	13	11	Ret	16	12	8	21
17	(France) Pierrot Vanstaen	Suzuki	17	9	10	Ret	25	13	11			21
18	(Italy) Ayrton Badovini	Ducati	Ret	Ret	14	12	12	12	12	13	Ret	21
19	(Italy) Fabrizio De Noni	Suzuki	11	Ret	11	14	15	19	18	Ret	11	18
20	(Spain) Iván Silva	Yamaha	4									13
21	(Italy) Roberto Lunadei	Suzuki		5	Ret							11
22	(Italy) Massimo Roccoli	Yamaha								5		11
23	(Italy) Vittorio Iannuzzo	Suzuki								Ret	5	11
24	(Italy) Stefano Bianco	Suzuki	8	WD	17	Ret		WD				8
25	(United Kingdom) Ben Wilson	Suzuki					8					8
26	(Belgium) Nicolas Saelens	Ducati	23	12	Ret	15	13	16	Ret		22	8
27	(Spain) Jose Lombardo	Suzuki	10	19	18	20	22	15	26	19	Ret	7
28	(United Kingdom) Richard Cooper	Honda							20	11	14	7
29	(Belgium) Sepp Vermonden	Suzuki	21	13	12	24	18	Ret	25	18	18	7
30	(Italy) Alessio Perilli	Honda	19	26	Ret	22						4
30	(Italy) Alessio Perilli	Yamaha					14	17	14			4
31	(Netherlands) Bob Withag	Yamaha							13			3
32	(France) David Fouloi	Suzuki								DNS	13	3
33	(Netherlands) Robert De Vries	Yamaha	DNS	DNQ	15	23	23	22	23	DSQ	21	1
	(Italy) Christian Dal Corso	Ducati	16	17	16	Ret	20	Ret	Ret	DSQ	WD	0
	(Belgium) Gregory Fastre	Yamaha	20	16	Ret	17	17	Ret	DNS	16	Ret	0
	(France) Cédric Tangre	Suzuki									16	0
	(Slovakia) Libor Buček	Honda	Ret	Ret	19	27						0
	(Netherlands) Ghisbert Van Ginhoven	Ducati			Ret	19	19	18	17		23	0
	(Italy) Niccolò Canepa	Kawasaki							22	17	19	0
	(Switzerland) Marc Wildisen	Suzuki				18						0
	(Estonia) Risto Klausen	Honda	DNQ		20	25	24	WD	WD			0
	(Belgium) Leroy Verboven	Suzuki	25	24	21	26	26	20	27	DSQ	24	0
	(United Kingdom) Barry Burrell	Honda							24	20	Ret	0
	(United Kingdom) Benjie Cockerill	Suzuki						21	Ret	DNS	20	0
	(Australia) David Butler	Ducati	Ret	22	Ret	21	21	Ret		WD	WD	0
	(Czech Republic) Matěj Smrž	Honda	22	Ret								0
	(Belgium) Tom Van Looy	Suzuki	DNQ	DNQ	22	28	28	Ret	28	DNQ	25	0
	(United Kingdom) David Gatenby	Suzuki	24	25								0
	(Czech Republic) Černý Jaroslav	Honda	26	DNQ								0
	(Israel) Yaron Salinger	Honda			DNQ	Ret	DNQ	DNQ	DNQ	DNQ	26	0
	(Czech Republic) Jiří Kadeřábek	Honda			Ret	Ret	27					0
	(Czech Republic) Tomas Holubec	Honda				29	Ret					0
	(United Kingdom) Dennis Hobbs	Suzuki			Ret	Ret						0
	(United Kingdom) Howie Mainwaring	Yamaha						Ret				0
	(China) Chow Ho-Wan	Ducati	DNQ									
Pos	Rider	Bike	VAL (Spain)	MIS (San Marino)	MNZ (Italy)	OSC (Germany)	SIL (United Kingdom)	BRA (Europe)	ASS (Netherlands)	IMO (Italy)	MAG (France)	Pts

Colour	Result
Gold	Winner
Silver	Second place
Bronze	Third place
Green	Points classification
Blue	Non-points classification
Blue	Non-classified finish (NC)
Purple	Retired, not classified (Ret)
Red	Did not qualify (DNQ)
Red	Did not pre-qualify (DNPQ)
Black	Disqualified (DSQ)
White	Did not start (DNS)
White	Withdrew (WD)
White	Race cancelled (C)
Blank	Did not practice (DNP)
Blank	Did not arrive (DNA)
Blank	Excluded (EX)

**Bold** – Pole position
Italics – Fastest lap
Source :
