= Sandro Cortese =

German motorcycle racer (born 1990)

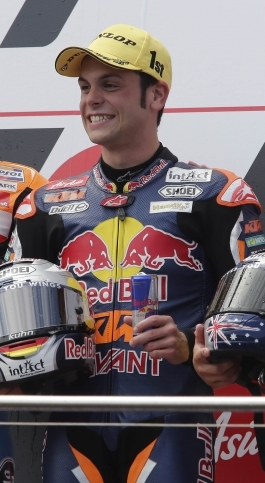
- Cortese at the 2012 Australian Grand Prix
- Nationality: German
- Born: 6 January 1990 (age 36); Ochsenhausen, West Germany
- Current team: Outdo Kawasaki TPR
- Bike number: 11
Motorcycle racing career statistics
Moto2 World Championship
Active years	2013–2017
Manufacturers	Kalex
Championships	0
2017 championship position	18th (43 pts)
Starts / Wins / Podiums / Poles / F. laps / Points; 88 / 0 / 3 / 0 / 0 / 301
Moto3 World Championship
Active years	2012
Manufacturers	KTM
Championships	1 (2012)
2012 championship position	1st (325 pts)
Starts / Wins / Podiums / Poles / F. laps / Points; 17 / 5 / 15 / 7 / 4 / 325
125cc World Championship
Active years	2005–2011
Manufacturers	Honda, Derbi, Aprilia
Championships	0
2011 championship position	4th (225 pts)
Starts / Wins / Podiums / Poles / F. laps / Points; 116 / 2 / 11 / 3 / 7 / 736
Superbike World Championship
Active years	2019–2020
Manufacturers	Yamaha, Kawasaki
Championships	0
2020 championship position	19th (14 pts)
Starts / Wins / Podiums / Poles / F. laps / Points; 43 / 0 / 0 / 0 / 0 / 148
Supersport World Championship
Active years	2018
Manufacturers	Yamaha
Championships	1 (2018)
2018 championship position	1st (208 pts)
Starts / Wins / Podiums / Poles / F. laps / Points; 12 / 2 / 8 / 3 / 7 / 208

Alessandro "Sandro" Cortese (born 6 January 1990) is a German former motorcycle racer, who last competed in the 2020 World Superbike Championship for Team Pedercini. Cortese won his first world title in the Moto3 class, in 2012, and his second in the Supersport World Championship, in 2018.

Cortese contested every race from his Grand Prix début in 2005 until the 2016 French Grand Prix, where he missed the race due to a knee injury.

== Career ==
=== Early career ===
Cortese was born in Ochsenhausen, West Germany, as the son of an Italian father and a German mother. He started his career at the age of nine on pocket bikes and was European Pocket Bike champion as well as German Mini Bike champion. He competed in the German IDM Championship in the 125cc class, finishing 10th.

=== 125cc World Championship ===
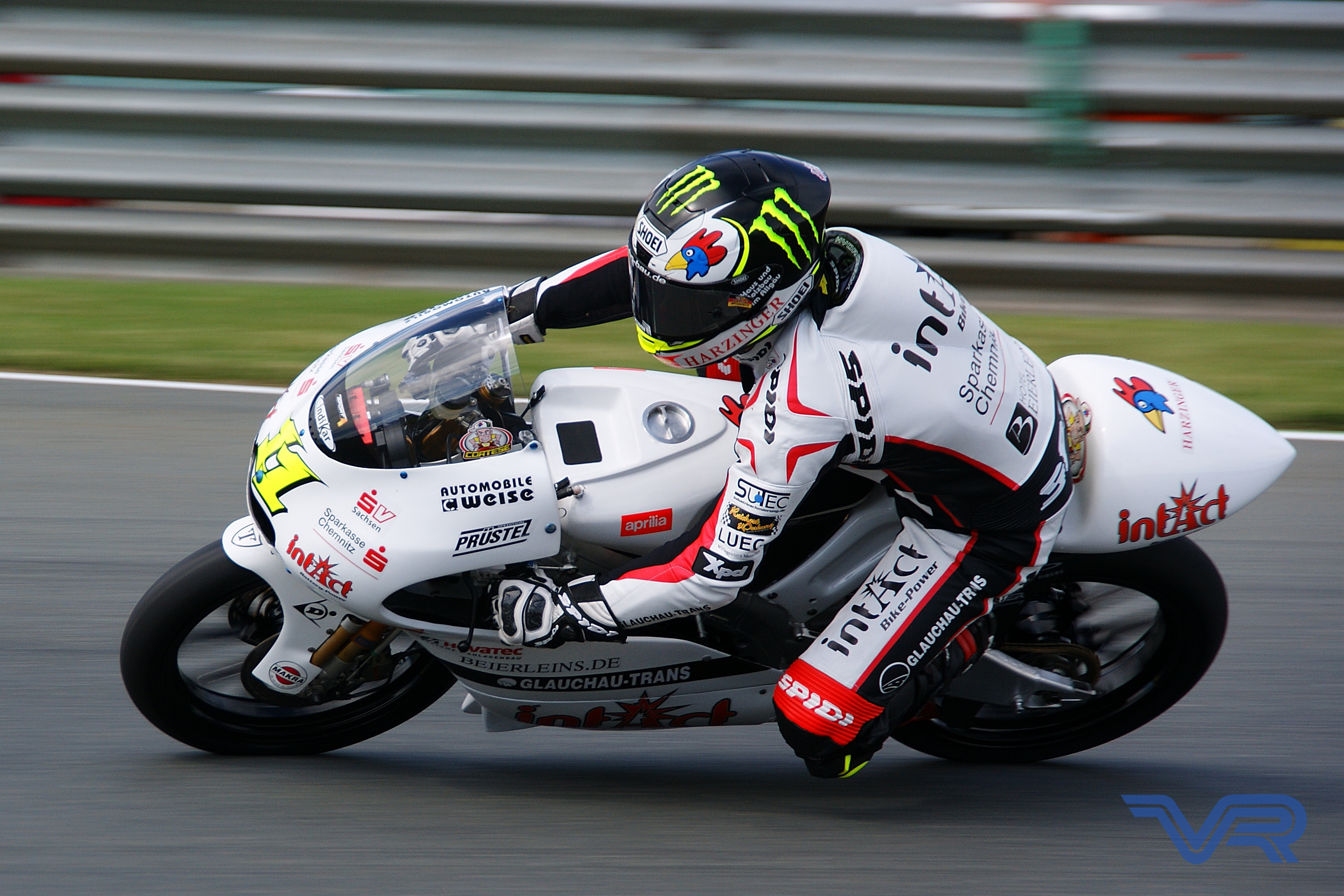
Sandro Cortese races MotoGP at Sachsenring, 2011

Cortese made his 125cc World Championship debut with Kiefer-Bos-Castrol Honda in 2005, finishing the season in 26th place with eight points. His best finish was 14th place in Germany, the Czech Republic, and Turkey. In 2006, he switched to the 2005 125cc Championship-winning team, Elit – Caffè Latte Honda as team mate to 125cc World Champion Thomas Lüthi. He made steady progress, scoring some championship points, His best result was in the Portuguese Grand Prix in tenth place, improving his championship standing to 17th place with 23 points.

In 2007, Cortese's team was renamed Emmi – Caffè Latte, and it switched to Aprilia motorbikes. Lüthi moved up to 250cc, also with Aprilia. Cortese improved in 2007, finishing most of the season's races in the top-ten, including seventh places in the French, the Italian and German Grands Prix. He finished the championship in 14th place with 66 points. For 2008, he rode a works Aprilia RSA 125. The 2008 season started poorly for him, finishing outside the top-eight at the first five races. His fortunes changed for the better after Mugello, and he finished consistently in the top eight. In the Australian Grand Prix he crashed while leading but managed to recover to sixth and helped Mike Di Meglio to win the championship by finishing ahead of Simone Corsi, Di Meglio's championship rival. In the Malaysian Grand Prix, he rode the fastest lap of the race despite starting 18th on the grid to finish fourth. He was the only 125cc rider to finish all races that year, gaining points in every race except in China.

In 2009, Cortese rode for the Finnish Ajo Motorsport team that took Di Meglio to his 125cc World Championship. He replaced Di Meglio and teamed up with Dominique Aegerter, running factory Derbi RSA 125 bikes. Cortese finished on the podium three times and ended up sixth in the championship.

For 2010, Cortese rode a Derbi again, for Ajo Motorsport. He was teamed up with Marc Márquez and Adrián Martín, with each rider running different sponsorship. Cortese took two podiums during the season, at the Sachsenring and Indianapolis. He also achieved pole position in Italy, and finished seventh in the championship.

For the 2011 season, Cortese moved to Dirk Heidolf's Racing Team Germany outfit, as a single-bike entry. He took second-place finishes in Qatar and Portugal, before taking his first Grand Prix victory – in his 109th start – in the Czech Republic, having battled with Johann Zarco in the closing stages of the race. Cortese eventually ended the season fourth in the championship.

=== Moto2 World Championship ===
Cortese moved up to the Moto2 class as a Moto3 champion in 2013. He joined Dynavolt Intact GP as the sole rider of the team. In 2014, Cortese recorded his first podium finish in Moto2 at Brno. He remained at the team until the end of 2017 season.

=== Supersport World Championship ===
After failing to secure a ride for the 2018 Moto2 season, Cortese signed a deal with Kallio Racing to race in the Supersport World Championship, aboard Yamaha YZF-R6. He won two races at Aragon and Donington Park, securing eight podium finishes and becoming the champion of 2018 Supersport World Championship in his maiden season.

=== Superbike World Championship ===
Cortese promoted to Superbike class for 2019 season, signing for GRT Yamaha World SBK team, where he finished 12th in the standings. The following year, he moved to Team Pedercini, where he switched bikes from Yamaha to Kawasaki. He crashed in the first race of Portimao round, suffering multiple injuries which he would recover from after eight months. He did not participate for the rest of the season, and his place was taken over by Roman Ramos, Valentin Debise, and Loris Cresson respectively.

=== Retirement ===
Nearly three years after his crash at Portimão, Cortese announced his retirement from motorcycle racing on his own Instagram account. He credited local emergency medical efforts for saving him from paraplegia but noted that his body has never fully recovered from the accident. Cortese is due to start a job at one of his former sponsors, Gutmann Gruppe. He currently lives in Berkheim and continues to work for Gutmann Gruppe.

== Career statistics ==
=== Grand Prix motorcycle racing ===
==== By season ====
Season	Class	Motorcycle	Type	Team	Race	Win	Podium	Pole	FLap	Pts	Plcd
2005	125cc	Honda	Honda RS125R	Kiefer-Bos-Castrol Honda	16	0	0	0	0	8	26th
2006	125cc	Honda	Honda RS125R	Elit – Caffè Latte	16	0	0	0	0	23	17th
2007	125cc	Aprilia	Aprilia RS125	Elit – Caffè Latte	17	0	0	0	0	66	14th
2008	125cc	Aprilia	Aprilia RSA 125	Elit – Caffè Latte	17	0	0	0	1	141	8th
2009	125cc	Derbi	Derbi RSA 125	Ajo Interwetten	16	0	3	1	2	130	6th
2010	125cc	Derbi	Derbi RS 125 R	Avant Mitsubishi Ajo	17	0	2	1	2	143	7th
2011	125cc	Aprilia	Aprilia RSA 125	Intact-Racing Team Germany	17	2	6	1	2	225	4th
2012	Moto3	KTM	KTM RC250GP	Red Bull KTM Ajo	17	5	15	7	4	325	**1st**
2013	Moto2	Kalex	Kalex Moto2	Dynavolt Intact GP	17	0	0	0	0	22	19th
2014	Moto2	Kalex	Kalex Moto2	Dynavolt Intact GP	18	0	1	0	0	85	9th
2015	Moto2	Kalex	Kalex Moto2	Dynavolt Intact GP	18	0	1	0	0	90	11th
2016	Moto2	Kalex	Kalex Moto2	Dynavolt Intact GP	17	0	1	0	0	61	15th
2017	Moto2	Suter	Suter MMX2	Dynavolt Intact GP	18	0	0	0	0	43	18th
Total					**221**	**7**	**29**	**10**	**11**	**1362**	

==== By class ====
Class	Seasons	1st GP	1st Pod	1st Win	Race	Win	Podiums	Pole	FLap	Pts	WChmp
125cc	2005–2011	2005 Spain	2009 Qatar	2011 Czech Republic	116	2	11	3	7	736	0
Moto3	2012	2012 Qatar	2012 Qatar	2012 Portugal	17	5	15	7	4	325	1
Moto2	2013–2017	2013 Qatar	2014 Czech Republic		88	0	3	0	0	301	0
Total	2005–2017				**221**	**7**	**29**	**10**	**11**	**1362**	**1**

==== Races by year ====
(key) (Races in bold indicate pole position, races in italics indicate fastest lap)

Year	Class	Bike	1	2	3	4	5	6	7	8	9	10	11	12	13	14	15	16	17	18	Pos	Pts
2005	125cc	Honda	SPA; 20	POR; 25	CHN; Ret	FRA; 15	ITA; Ret	CAT; 23	NED; 24	GBR; 15	GER; 14	CZE; 14	JPN; Ret	MAL; 21	QAT; 17	AUS; 19	TUR; 14	VAL; Ret			26th	8
2006	125cc	Honda	SPA; 16	QAT; Ret	TUR; 16	CHN; 17	FRA; 15	ITA; Ret	CAT; 19	NED; 14	GBR; 14	GER; 13	CZE; 11	MAL; 17	AUS; 14	JPN; 14	POR; 10	VAL; 18			17th	23
2007	125cc	Aprilia	QAT; 17	SPA; 7	TUR; Ret	CHN; 18	FRA; 7	ITA; 7	CAT; 11	GBR; 12	NED; 8	GER; 7	CZE; 10	RSM; 15	POR; Ret	JPN; Ret	AUS; 10	MAL; Ret	VAL; Ret		14th	66
2008	125cc	Aprilia	QAT; 11	SPA; 10	POR; 10	CHN; 16	FRA; 11	ITA; 8	CAT; 8	GBR; 9	NED; 4	GER; 6	CZE; 7	RSM; 7	INP; 5	JPN; 6	AUS; 6	MAL; 4	VAL; 5		8th	141
2009	125cc	Derbi	QAT; 3	JPN; 6	SPA; 6	FRA; 12	ITA; 10	CAT; 9	**NED**; Ret	GER; 6	GBR; Ret	CZE; 6	INP; 18	RSM; 5	POR; 2	AUS; 3	MAL; 6	VAL; 8			6th	130
2010	125cc	Derbi	QAT; 5	SPA; 11	FRA; 6	**ITA**; Ret	GBR; 6	NED; 5	CAT; 4	GER; 3	CZE; 16	INP; 2	RSM; 5	ARA; 5	JPN; 12	MAL; 6	AUS; Ret	POR; Ret	VAL; 5		7th	143
2011	125cc	Aprilia	QAT; 2	**SPA**; 6	POR; 2	FRA; 7	CAT; 4	GBR; 7	NED; 4	ITA; 12	GER; 8	CZE; 1	INP; 3	RSM; 4	ARA; 7	JPN; 5	AUS; 1	MAL; 2	VAL; Ret		4th	225
2012	Moto3	KTM	**QAT**; 3	SPA; 3	**POR**; 1	FRA; 6	CAT; 2	GBR; 3	**NED**; 2	**GER**; 1	ITA; 3	**INP**; 2	CZE; 3	**RSM**; 1	ARA; 2	JPN; 6	MAL; 1	**AUS**; 1	VAL; 2		**1st**	**325**
2013	Moto2	Kalex	QAT; 17	AME; 25	SPA; 18	FRA; 12	ITA; 14	CAT; Ret	NED; 14	GER; 14	INP; 16	CZE; Ret	GBR; 20	RSM; Ret	ARA; 10	MAL; Ret	AUS; 11	JPN; 15	VAL; 16		19th	22
2014	Moto2	Kalex	QAT; 7	AME; 14	ARG; 9	SPA; 9	FRA; 12	ITA; 13	CAT; Ret	NED; Ret	GER; Ret	INP; 6	CZE; 3	GBR; 18	RSM; 12	ARA; 12	JPN; Ret	AUS; 6	MAL; 7	VAL; Ret	9th	85
2015	Moto2	Kalex	QAT; 7	AME; 14	ARG; 7	SPA; Ret	FRA; 14	ITA; 8	CAT; Ret	NED; 17	GER; 11	INP; Ret	CZE; 8	GBR; 8	RSM; 8	ARA; 13	JPN; 3	AUS; Ret	MAL; 7	VAL; 13	11th	90
2016	Moto2	Kalex	QAT; 15	ARG; Ret	AME; 12	SPA; Ret	FRA; DNS	ITA; 11	CAT; Ret	NED; 12	GER; 15	AUT; 11	CZE; 23	GBR; 12	RSM; 9	ARA; 13	JPN; 5	AUS; 3	MAL; 17	VAL; Ret	15th	61
2017	Moto2	Suter	QAT; 22	ARG; 8	AME; 23	SPA; Ret	FRA; 14	ITA; 19	CAT; Ret	NED; Ret	GER; 8	CZE; Ret	AUT; Ret	GBR; Ret	RSM; 5	ARA; 9	JPN; Ret	AUS; 9	MAL; Ret	VAL; Ret	18th	43

=== Supersport World Championship ===
==== Races by year ====
(key) (Races in bold indicate pole position; races in italics indicate fastest lap)

Year	Bike	1	2	3	4	5	6	7	8	9	10	11	12	Pos	Pts
2018	Yamaha	AUS; 3	THA; 4	**SPA**; 1	**NED**; 6	ITA; 4	GBR; 1	**CZE**; 2	ITA; 3	POR; 6	FRA; 2	ARG; 2	QAT; 2	1st	208

=== Superbike World Championship ===
==== Races by year ====
(key) (Races in bold indicate pole position) (Races in italics indicate fastest lap)

Year	Bike	1			2			3			4			5			6			7			8			9			10			11			12			13			Pos	Pts
Year	Bike	R1	SR	R2	R1	SR	R2	R1	SR	R2	R1	SR	R2	R1	SR	R2	R1	SR	R2	R1	SR	R2	R1	SR	R2	R1	SR	R2	R1	SR	R2	R1	SR	R2	R1	SR	R2	R1	SR	R2	Pos	Pts
2019	Yamaha	AUS; 8	AUS; 7	AUS; 8	THA; 7	THA; 7	THA; 7	SPA; 7	SPA; 9	SPA; 10	NED; 13	NED; C	NED; 11	ITA; Ret	ITA; 13	ITA; C	SPA; 8	SPA; 9	SPA; 6	ITA; 7	ITA; Ret	ITA; 15	GBR; Ret	GBR; Ret	GBR; 13	USA; 14	USA; 11	USA; 14	POR; 8	POR; 8	POR; 10	FRA; 10	FRA; 11	FRA; Ret	ARG; DNS	ARG; 7	ARG; 15	QAT; Ret	QAT; 8	QAT; 10	12th	134
2020	Kawasaki	AUS; 13	AUS; 11	AUS; 9	SPA; 14	SPA; 14	SPA; 14	POR; Ret	POR; DNS	POR; DNS	SPA	SPA	SPA	SPA	SPA	SPA	SPA	SPA	SPA	FRA	FRA	FRA	POR	POR	POR																19th	14
