= Stefan Bradl =

German motorcycle racer

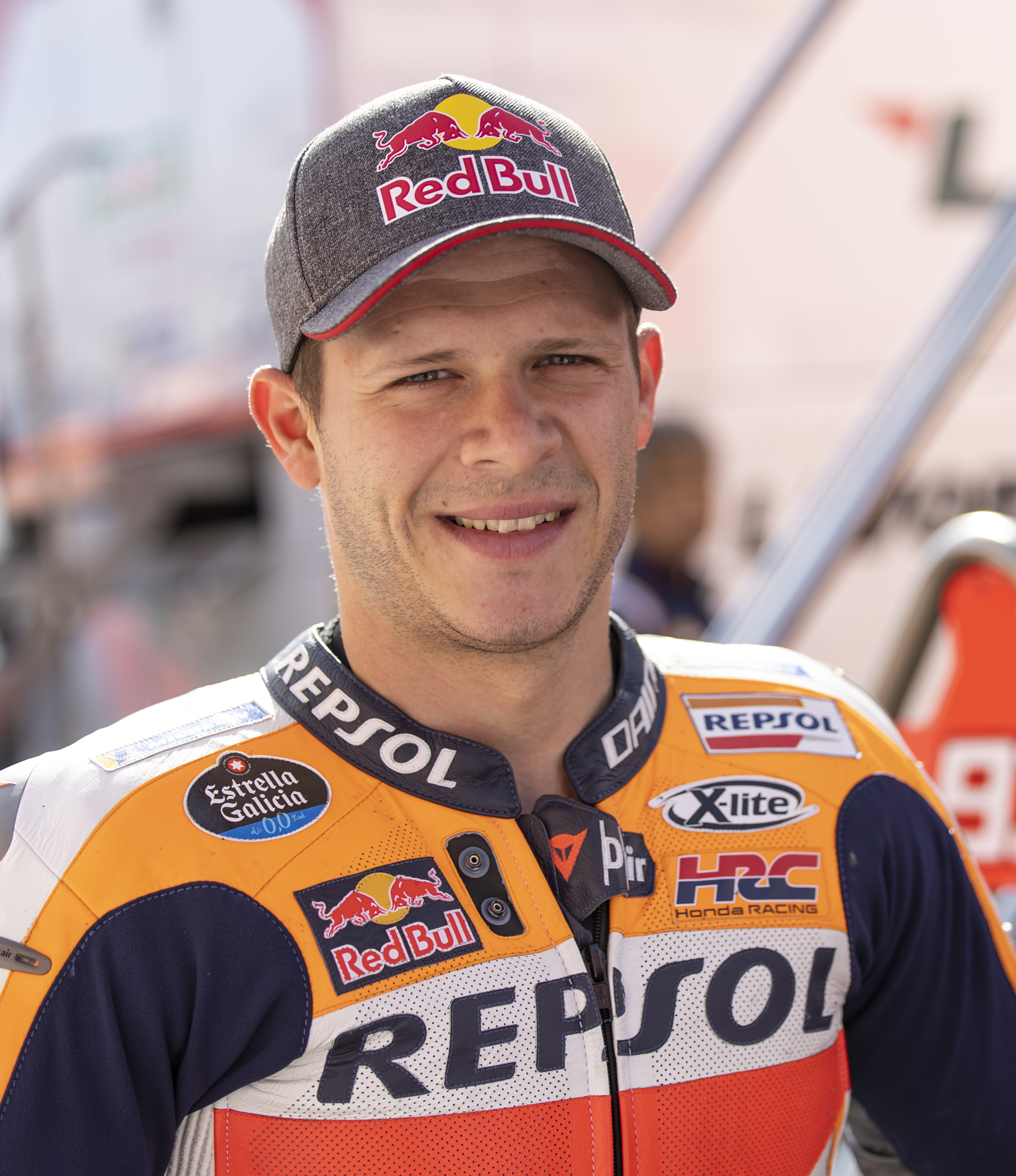
- Bradl at the 2022 British Grand Prix
- Nationality: German
- Born: 29 November 1989 (age 36); Augsburg, West Germany
- Current team: Repsol Honda Team (Test/Replacement rider)
- Bike number: 6
Motorcycle racing career statistics
MotoGP World Championship
Active years	2012–2016, 2018–2024
Manufacturers	Honda (2012-2014, 2018–2024); Yamaha Forward (2015); Aprilia (2015–2016)
Championships	0
2024 championship position	25th (2 pts)
Starts / Wins / Podiums / Poles / F. laps / Points; 131 / 0 / 1 / 1 / 0 / 567
Moto2 World Championship
Active years	2010–2011
Manufacturers	Suter, Kalex
Championships	1 (2011)
2011 championship position	1st (274 pts)
Starts / Wins / Podiums / Poles / F. laps / Points; 33 / 5 / 12 / 7 / 3 / 371
125cc World Championship
Active years	2005–2009
Manufacturers	KTM, Aprilia
Championships	0
2009 championship position	10th (85 pts)
Starts / Wins / Podiums / Poles / F. laps / Points; 54 / 2 / 6 / 0 / 2 / 316
Superbike World Championship
Active years	2017
Manufacturers	Honda
Championships	0
2017 championship position	14th (67 pts)
Starts / Wins / Podiums / Poles / F. laps / Points; 14 / 0 / 0 / 0 / 0 / 67

Stefan Bradl (born 29 November 1989) is a German professional motorcycle racer, best known for winning the Moto2 World Championship in 2011. He then moved to MotoGP in 2012 with LCR Honda. While in MotoGP, Bradl is best known for his performance at Laguna Seca getting the pole position and finishing second in the race behind Marc Marquez, ahead of Valentino Rossi. Bradl finished the 2013 season 7th, despite missing two races due to injury. This proved to be his highest ever MotoGP finish.

Bradl is the son of former racer Helmut Bradl. He is contracted as a test rider for Honda Racing Corporation in MotoGP and made occasional race starts from 2018 to 2024 as a wild card or an injury replacement.

== Career ==
=== 125cc World Championship (2005–2009) ===
Born in Augsburg, West Germany, Bradl started his 125cc World Championship career in 2005 as a wild card for three races, competing in the 125cc German Championship with KTM. He took more wild card races in 2006, still with KTM. He had a terrible fracture when he was hit by another rider during practice for the 2006 Malaysian GP. Later that year, he was competing again at the Red Bull KTM Junior.

Bradl was offered by Alberto Puig to ride his Repsol Honda factory 250cc team for 2007; he withdrew after a couple of tests, but did not stop racing. Later, he joined the 125cc Spanish Championship with Blusens Aprilia, winning the title just five points ahead of his teammate Scott Redding. He later took a couple of wild card World Championship races, with the same team. Additionally, from the 2007 Portuguese GP onwards, Blusens Aprilia Team principal Raúl Romero placed him on a second bike with veteran Pablo Nieto, replacing Dutchman Hugo van den Berg.

For 2008, rather than stay with Blusens Aprilia, Bradl decided to ride for the German Grizzly Gas Kiefer Racing, on an official factory Aprilia RSA 125. He took his first win at Brno, fittingly a track his father won at in 1991.

=== Moto2 World Championship (2010–2011) ===
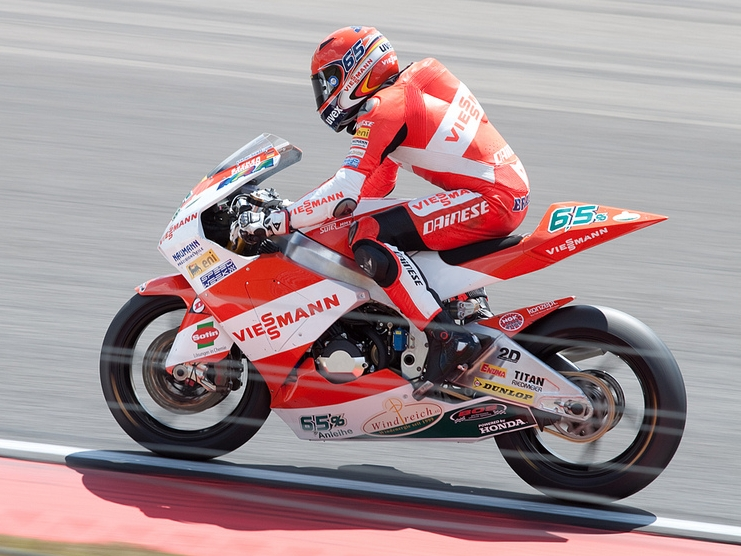
Bradl at the 2010 Dutch TT

After moving up to the Moto2 class of Grand Prix racing in 2010, Bradl went on to claim ninth in the championship, with one victory at Estoril.

2011 saw Bradl win four of the first six races, and maintained a healthy lead in the championship until Marc Márquez found significant speed halfway through the season. The championship seemed to be going down to the wire, with both Bradl and Márquez having a fair shot at the title with two rounds remaining. Márquez, however, suffered a heavy fall during free practice for the Malaysian Grand Prix, and was unable to race for the remainder of the season, due to eyesight problems. Bradl was therefore crowned the World Champion at the final race of the season in Valencia, Spain.

=== MotoGP World Championship (2012–2016) ===
==== LCR Honda (2012–2014) ====
Bradl was signed by the LCR Honda team for 2012. He had a good season, running consistently in the top-ten, with a best result of fourth place obtained at the Italian Grand Prix. He completed the season in eighth place, winning the Rookie of the Year award.

Bradl battled consistently among the second group of riders in 2013, along with Valentino Rossi, Cal Crutchlow and Álvaro Bautista. The highlight of his season was a pole-position at the United States Grand Prix, at Laguna Seca, where he also finished second, achieving his first MotoGP podium. A crash towards the end of the season at the Malaysian Grand Prix – in which he broke an ankle – took him out of contention in the battle for fifth place with Bautista and Crutchlow. He closed the season in seventh place with 156 points.

In 2014, Bradl continued to ride for LCR Honda. However, on 2 August 2014, it was announced that Cal Crutchlow would join LCR Honda for the 2015 season and ride the factory-specification Honda RC213V. Bradl subsequently announced a move to the Forward Racing team for 2015, riding an open-specification bike.

==== Athinà Forward Racing (2015) ====
For the 2015 season, Bradl moved to Forward Racing, riding a Yamaha Forward – where he was joined by Loris Baz, moving into the series from the Superbike World Championship. At the midway point of the season, Bradl had collected nine points, despite missing his home race at the Sanchsenring due to injury. After the summer break, Bradl parted company with the team, following the arrest of team boss Giovanni Cuzari.

==== Aprilia Racing Team Gresini (2015–2016) ====
In August, Bradl joined Aprilia Gresini Racing for the remainder of the 2015 season. His partnership with Gresini started with a 20th at Indianapolis, and scored his first points for the team, with 14th at Brno.

For the 2016 season, Bradl was partnered by Spanish rider Álvaro Bautista. He collected 63 points, with no poles, fastest laps and podiums. He finished the season ranked 16th overall.

=== Superbike World Championship (2017) ===
For the 2017 season, Bradl moved from MotoGP to the Superbike World Championship, riding a Honda of the RedBull Honda Team. He only raced six full rounds and four half-rounds; taking up 67 points and ranked 14th in the list.

=== Return to MotoGP (2018–present) ===
==== EG 0,0 Marc VDS, HRC Honda Team & LCR Honda (2018) ====
In 2018, Bradl returned to MotoGP as a replacement rider for an injured Franco Morbidelli at EG 0,0 Marc VDS Racing in his home race at the Sachsenring. He made two wildcard entries for HRC Honda Team at the Czech Republic and San Marino rounds. Bradl replaced the injured Cal Crutchlow at LCR Honda for the final two rounds, finishing 13th in Malaysia and ninth in Valencia. He collected ten points total on the season, and was ranked 24th overall.

==== Repsol Honda Team (2019–present) ====
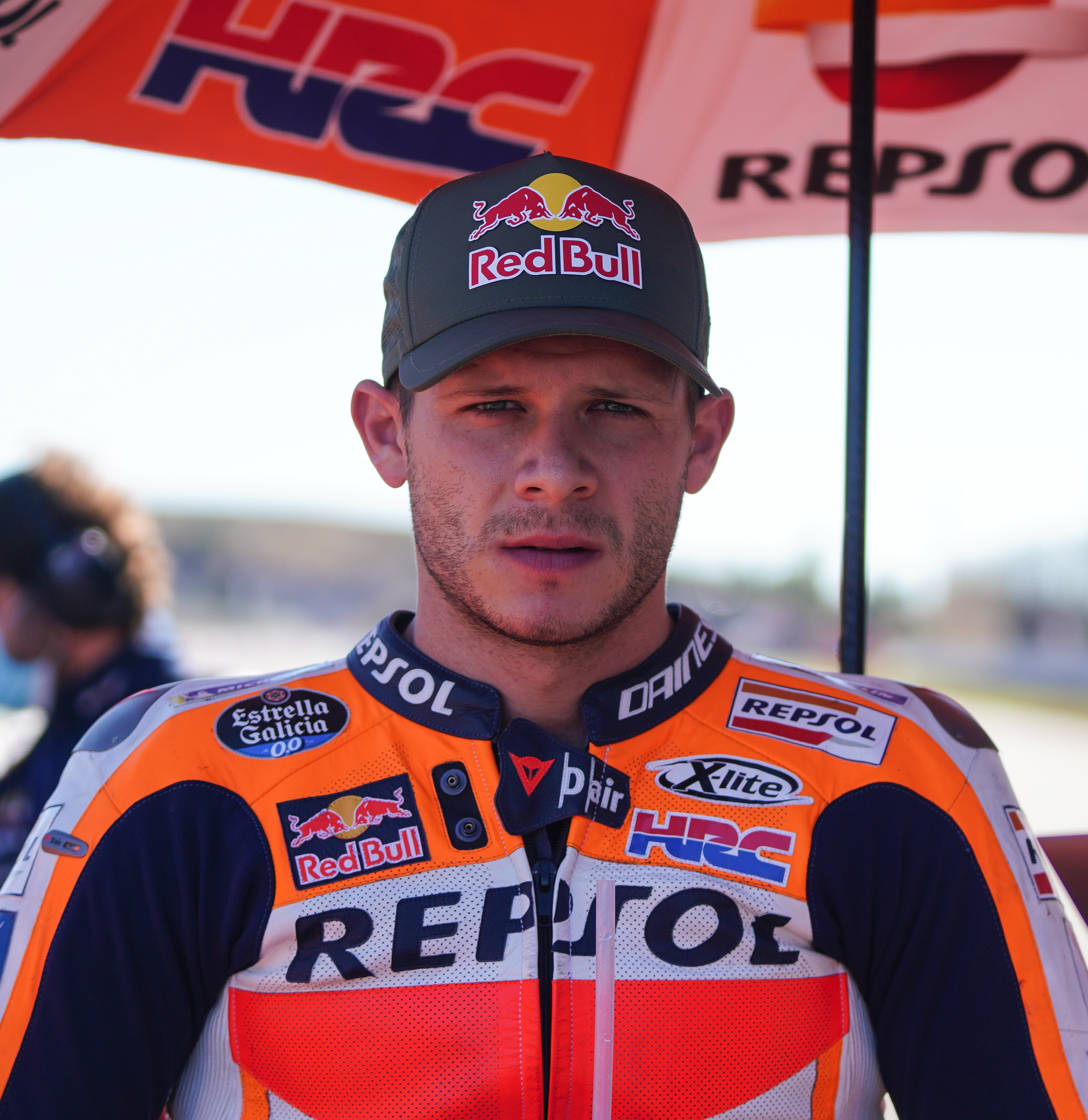
Bradl at the 2021 Algarve Grand Prix

In 2019, Bradl was contracted as a test rider for the Honda works MotoGP team. He raced in the Spanish Grand Prix in Jerez as a wildcard entry and in the German, Czech Republic and Austrian Grand Prix as a replacement for the injured Jorge Lorenzo. Bradl finished tenth at Jerez as a wildcard rider. In his second outing as replacement for Lorenzo, he finished tenth in Germany, 15th at Brno and 13th in Austria.

In 2020, Bradl was called up as a replacement rider for Marc Márquez from the Czech Republic round onwards, while Márquez was recovering from injuries sustained in an August crash at the Spanish Grand Prix.

In 2021, Bradl was a replacement rider for injured Marquez in the early season. He finished in 11th and 14th with two consecutive weekend races at Losail, Doha. Bradl also had a wild card ride in 2021 at Jerez, finishing in 12th.

For 2022, in the third race of the season at Argentina on 3 April, Bradl finished in 19th when deputising for Marc Márquez, who was injured in March a few hours before the Indonesian Grand Prix at Mandalika.

== Career statistics ==
=== Grand Prix motorcycle racing ===
==== By season ====
Season	Class	Motorcycle	Team	Race	Win	Podium	Pole	FLap	Pts	Plcd	WCh
2005	125cc	KTM	Red Bull ADAC KTM Juniors	3	0	0	0	0	1	35th	–
2006	125cc	KTM	Red Bull KTM Junior Team	9	0	0	0	0	4	26th	–
2007	125cc	Aprilia	Blusens Aprilia	9	0	0	0	0	39	18th	–
2008	125cc	Aprilia	Grizzly Gas Kiefer Racing	17	2	6	0	2	187	4th	–
2009	125cc	Aprilia	Viessmann Kiefer Racing	16	0	0	0	0	85	10th	–
2010	Moto2	Suter	Viessmann Kiefer Racing	16	1	1	0	0	97	9th	–
2011	Moto2	Kalex	Viessmann Kiefer Racing	17	4	11	7	3	274	**1st**	1
2012	MotoGP	Honda	LCR Honda MotoGP	18	0	0	0	0	135	8th	–
2013	MotoGP	Honda	LCR Honda MotoGP	16	0	1	1	0	156	7th	–
2014	MotoGP	Honda	LCR Honda MotoGP	18	0	0	0	0	117	9th	–
2015	MotoGP	Yamaha Forward	Athinà Forward Racing	8	0	0	0	0	9	18th	–
2015	MotoGP	Aprilia	Aprilia Racing Team Gresini	9	0	0	0	0	8	18th	–
2016	MotoGP	Aprilia	Aprilia Racing Team Gresini	17	0	0	0	0	63	16th	–
2018	MotoGP	Honda	EG 0,0 Marc VDS	1	0	0	0	0	0	24th	–
2018	MotoGP	Honda	HRC Honda Team	2	0	0	0	0	0	24th	–
2018	MotoGP	Honda	LCR Honda	2	0	0	0	0	10	24th	–
2019	MotoGP	Honda	Team HRC	1	0	0	0	0	6	21st	–
2019	MotoGP	Honda	Repsol Honda Team	3	0	0	0	0	10	21st	–
2020	MotoGP	Honda	Repsol Honda Team	11	0	0	0	0	27	19th	–
2021	MotoGP	Honda	Repsol Honda Team	3	0	0	0	0	8	22nd	–
2021	MotoGP	Honda	Honda HRC	2	0	0	0	0	6	22nd	–
2022	MotoGP	Honda	Repsol Honda Team	7	0	0	0	0	2	26th	–
2022	MotoGP	Honda	Team HRC	1	0	0	0	0	0	26th	–
2023	MotoGP	Honda	Repsol Honda Team	1	0	0	0	0	0	26th	-
2023	MotoGP	Honda	Team HRC	2	0	0	0	0	2	26th	-
2023	MotoGP	Honda	LCR Honda	3	0	0	0	0	6	26th	-
2024	MotoGP	Honda	HRC Test Team	6	0	0	0	0	2	25th	–
Total				**218**	**7**	**19**	**8**	**5**	**1254**		**1**

==== By class ====
Class	Seasons	1st GP	1st Pod	1st Win	Race	Win	Podiums	Pole	FLap	Pts	WChmp
125cc	2005–2009	2005 Catalunya	2008 Qatar	2008 Czech Republic	54	2	6	0	2	316	0
Moto2	2010–2011	2010 Qatar	2010 Portugal	2010 Portugal	33	5	12	7	3	371	1
MotoGP	2012–2016, 2018–2024	2012 Qatar	2013 United States		131	0	1	1	0	567	0
Total	2005–2016, 2018–2024				**218**	**7**	**19**	**8**	**5**	**1254**	**1**

==== Races by year ====
(key) (Races in bold indicate pole position, races in italics indicate fastest lap)

Year	Class	Bike	1	2	3	4	5	6	7	8	9	10	11	12	13	14	15	16	17	18	19	20	Pos	Pts
2005	125cc	KTM	SPA	POR	CHN	FRA	ITA	CAT; Ret	NED	GBR	GER; 16	CZE; 15	JPN	MAL	QAT	AUS	TUR	VAL					35th	1
2006	125cc	KTM	SPA; DNQ	QAT; 26	TUR; 19	CHN; 20	FRA; 18	ITA; 16	CAT; WD	NED; 31	GBR; Ret	GER; 18	CZE; 12	MAL; DNS	AUS	JPN	POR	VAL					26th	4
2007	125cc	Aprilia	QAT	SPA	TUR	CHN	FRA	ITA	CAT; 9	GBR	NED; 10	GER; 13	CZE	RSM; 7	POR; 6	JPN; 15	AUS; Ret	MAL; 13	VAL; Ret				18th	39
2008	125cc	Aprilia	QAT; 3	SPA; 4	POR; 8	CHN; 5	FRA; 6	ITA; 10	CAT; 4	GBR; Ret	NED; 12	GER; 2	CZE; 1	RSM; Ret	INP; 3	JPN; 1	AUS; 2	MAL; Ret	VAL; Ret				4th	187
2009	125cc	Aprilia	QAT; 8	JPN; 4	SPA; Ret	FRA; Ret	ITA; 8	CAT; 7	NED; 6	GER; Ret	GBR; Ret	CZE; 7	INP; 7	RSM; 6	POR; 4	AUS; Ret	MAL; Ret	VAL; Ret					10th	85
2010	Moto2	Suter	QAT; Ret	SPA; 14	FRA; 9	ITA; 14	GBR; Ret	NED; 19	CAT	GER; 9	CZE; 9	INP; Ret	RSM; 5	ARA; 9	JPN; 7	MAL; 7	AUS; 5	POR; 1	VAL; Ret				9th	97
2011	Moto2	Kalex	**QAT**; 1	**SPA**; 5	**POR**; 1	**FRA**; 3	**CAT**; 1	GBR; 1	**NED**; Ret	ITA; 2	GER; 2	CZE; 3	INP; 6	**RSM**; 2	ARA; 8	JPN; 4	AUS; 2	MAL; 2	VAL; Ret				1st	274
2012	MotoGP	Honda	QAT; 8	SPA; 7	POR; 9	FRA; 5	CAT; 8	GBR; 8	NED; Ret	GER; 5	ITA; 4	USA; 7	INP; 6	CZE; 5	RSM; 6	ARA; Ret	JPN; 6	MAL; Ret	AUS; 6	VAL; Ret			8th	135
2013	MotoGP	Honda	QAT; Ret	AME; 5	SPA; Ret	FRA; 10	ITA; 4	CAT; 5	NED; 6	GER; 4	**USA**; 2	INP; 7	CZE; 6	GBR; 6	RSM; 5	ARA; 5	MAL; DNS	AUS; DNS	JPN; 5	VAL; 6			7th	156
2014	MotoGP	Honda	QAT; Ret	AME; 4	ARG; 5	SPA; 10	FRA; 7	ITA; Ret	CAT; 5	NED; 10	GER; 16	INP; Ret	CZE; 7	GBR; 7	RSM; Ret	ARA; 4	JPN; 7	AUS; Ret	MAL; 4	VAL; 8			9th	117
2015	MotoGP	Yamaha Forward	QAT; 16	AME; Ret	ARG; 15	SPA; 16	FRA; Ret	ITA; Ret	CAT; 8	NED; Ret	GER												18th	17
2015	MotoGP	Aprilia											INP; 20	CZE; 14	GBR; Ret	RSM; 16	ARA; 18	JPN; 18	AUS; 21	MAL; 10	VAL; 18		18th	17
2016	MotoGP	Aprilia	QAT; Ret	ARG; 7	AME; 10	SPA; 14	FRA; 10	ITA; 14	CAT; 12	NED; 8	GER; DNS	AUT; 19	CZE; 14	GBR; Ret	RSM; 12	ARA; 10	JPN; 10	AUS; 11	MAL; 17	VAL; 13			16th	63
2018	MotoGP	Honda	QAT	ARG	AME	SPA	FRA	ITA	CAT	NED	GER; 16	CZE; Ret	AUT	GBR	RSM; Ret	ARA	THA	JPN	AUS	MAL; 13	VAL; 9		24th	10
2019	MotoGP	Honda	QAT	ARG	AME	SPA; 10	FRA	ITA	CAT	NED	GER; 10	CZE; 15	AUT; 13	GBR	RSM	ARA	THA	JPN	AUS	MAL	VAL		21st	16
2020	MotoGP	Honda	SPA	ANC	CZE; 18	AUT; 17	STY; 18	RSM; 18	EMI; DNS	CAT; 17	FRA; 8	ARA; 17	TER; 12	EUR; 12	VAL; 14	POR; 7							19th	27
2021	MotoGP	Honda	QAT; 11	DOH; 14	POR	SPA; 12	FRA	ITA	CAT	GER	NED	STY	AUT	GBR	ARA	RSM; 14	AME	EMI	ALR; 15	VAL			22nd	14
2022	MotoGP	Honda	QAT	INA	ARG; 19	AME	POR	SPA; Ret	FRA	ITA	CAT; Ret	GER; 16	NED; 18	GBR; 19	AUT; 17	RSM; 14	ARA	JPN	THA	AUS	MAL	VAL	26th	2
2023	MotoGP	Honda	POR	ARG	AME; Ret	SPA; 14	FRA	ITA	GER	NED; 13	GBR	AUT	CAT	RSM; 18	IND; 15	JPN; 14	INA	AUS	THA	MAL	QAT	VAL	26th	8
2024	MotoGP	Honda	QAT	POR	AME	SPA; 16	FRA	CAT; 19	ITA	NED	GER; 20	GBR	AUT; 22	ARA	RSM; 14	EMI	INA	JPN	AUS	THA	MAL	SLD; 22	25th	2

=== Superbike World Championship ===
==== Races by year ====
(key) (Races in bold indicate pole position; races in italics indicate fastest lap)

Year	Bike	1		2		3		4		5		6		7		8		9		10		11		12		13		Pos	Pts
Year	Bike	R1	R2	R1	R2	R1	R2	R1	R2	R1	R2	R1	R2	R1	R2	R1	R2	R1	R2	R1	R2	R1	R2	R1	R2	R1	R2	Pos	Pts
2017	Honda	AUS; 15	AUS; 15	THA; 10	THA; Ret	SPA; 9	SPA; 12	NED; 6	NED; 10	ITA; 10	ITA; 14	GBR; Ret	GBR; 11	ITA; NC	ITA; 10	USA; 11	USA; 11	GER; DNS	GER; 13	POR; Ret	POR; DNS	FRA	FRA	SPA	SPA	QAT	QAT	14th	67

Sporting positions
Preceded by Pol Espargaró	Spanish 125cc Champion; 2007	Succeeded by Efrén Vázquez
