= Bernat Martínez =

Spanish motorcycle racer

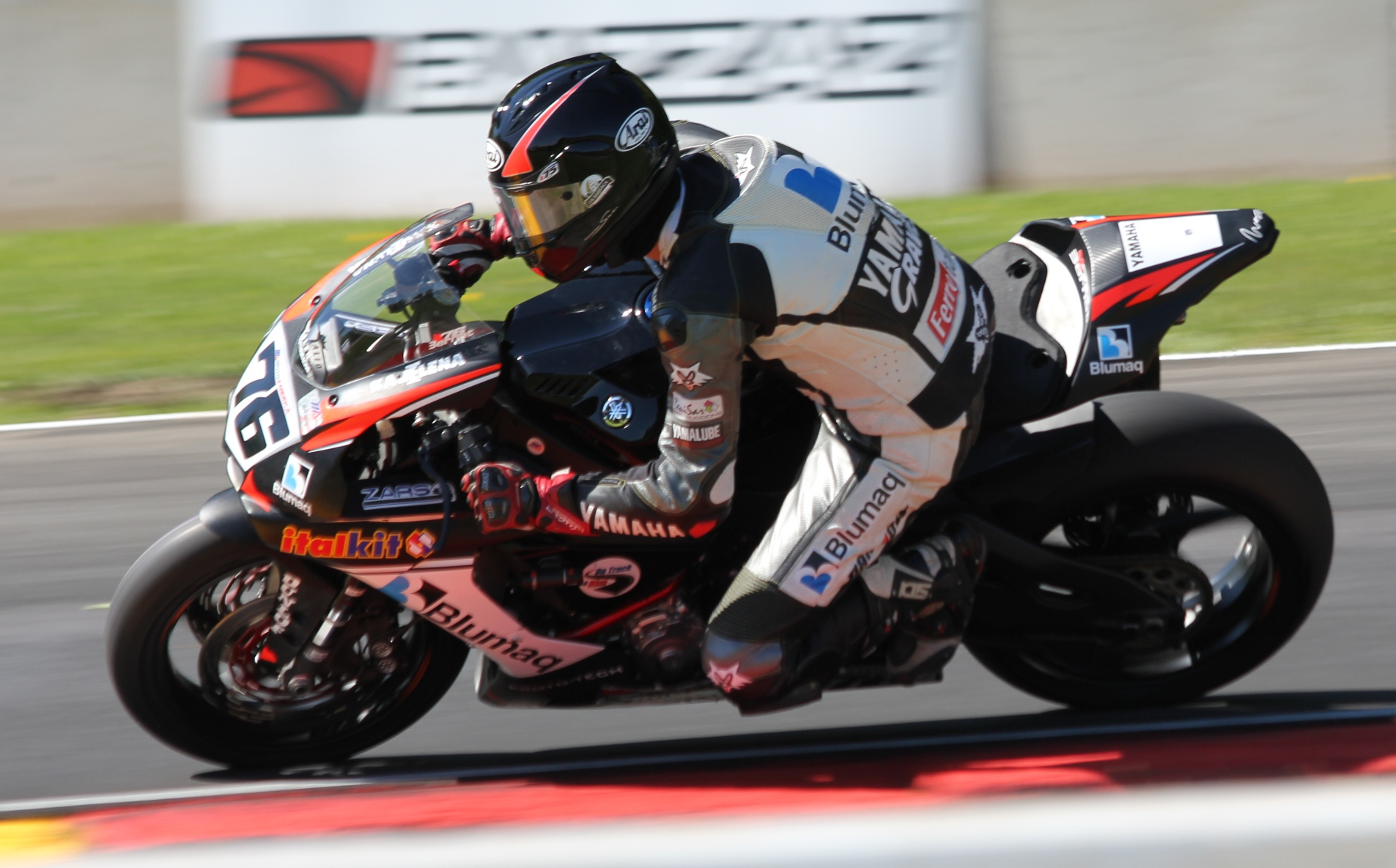
- Martínez leaning left at turn 6 at Road America, 2015
- Nationality: Spanish
- Born: 10 January 1980; Alberic, Spain
- Died: 19 July 2015 (aged 35); Monterey, California, United States
Motorcycle racing career statistics
Moto2 World Championship
Active years	2010
Manufacturers	Bimota
Starts / Wins / Podiums / Poles / F. laps / Points; 7 / 0 / 0 / 0 / 0 / 0
Superbike World Championship
Active years	2005
Manufacturers	Yamaha
Starts / Wins / Podiums / Poles / F. laps / Points; 0 / 0 / 0 / 0 / 0 / 0
Supersport World Championship
Active years	2006
Manufacturers	Yamaha
Starts / Wins / Podiums / Poles / F. laps / Points; 3 / 0 / 0 / 0 / 0 / 0

Bernat Martínez Mas (10 January 1980 – 19 July 2015) was a Spanish motorcycle racer. At international level, he competed in the European Superstock 1000 Championship, the Superbike World Championship, the Supersport World Championship and the Moto2 World Championship. He died on 19 July 2015 along with Dani Rivas due to injuries sustained in an accident in Laguna Seca.

== Career statistics ==
2007: 1st, Catalan Road Racing Championship

=== Superstock European Championship ===
==== Races by year ====
(key) (Races in bold indicate pole position) (Races in italics indicate fastest lap)

Year	Bike	1	2	3	4	5	6	7	8	9	Pos	Pts
2001	Aprilia	VAL	MNZ	DON	LAU	SMR	BRA	OSC	NED	IMO; 17	NC	0
2003	Suzuki	VAL; 8	MNZ; Ret	OSC; 7	SIL; 4	SMR; 6	BRA; 15	NED; 8	IMO; 4	MAG; 6	9th	72
2004	Suzuki/Yamaha	VAL; Ret	SMR; 11	MNZ; 5	OSC; 4	SIL; 5	BRA; 9	NED; Ret	IMO	MAG; WD	11th	47

=== Superbike World Championship ===
==== Races by year ====
Year	Make	1		2		3		4		5		6		7		8		9		10		11		12		Pos.	Pts
Year	Make	R1	R2	R1	R2	R1	R2	R1	R2	R1	R2	R1	R2	R1	R2	R1	R2	R1	R2	R1	R2	R1	R2	R1	R2	Pos.	Pts
2005	Yamaha	QAT	QAT	AUS	AUS	SPA; DNS	SPA; DNS	ITA	ITA	EUR	EUR	SMR	SMR	CZE	CZE	GBR	GBR	NED	NED	GER	GER	ITA	ITA	FRA	FRA	NC	0

=== Supersport World Championship ===
==== Races by year ====
(key)

Year	Bike	1	2	3	4	5	6	7	8	9	10	11	12	Pos.	Pts
2006	Yamaha	QAT	AUS	SPA; DNS	ITA	EUR; 21	SMR; 17	CZE; Ret	GBR	NED	GER	ITA	FRA	NC	0

=== Grand Prix motorcycle racing ===
==== By season ====
Season	Class	Motorcycle	Team	Race	Win	Podium	Pole	FLap	Pts	Plcd
2010	Moto2	Bimota	Maquinza-SAG Team	7	0	0	0	0	0	NC
Total				**7**	**0**	**0**	**0**	**0**	**0**	

==== Races by year ====
(key)

Year	Class	Bike	1	2	3	4	5	6	7	8	9	10	11	12	13	14	15	16	17	Pos.	Pts
2010	Moto2	Bimota	QAT; 29	SPA; 27	FRA; 29	ITA; 29	GBR; 25	NED; 28	CAT; Ret	GER	CZE	INP	RSM	ARA	JPN	MAL	AUS	POR	VAL	NC	0
