= 2010 Italian motorcycle Grand Prix =

4th round of the 2010 FIM Road Racing World Championship season

(Italy) 2010 Italian Grand Prix
Race details
- Race 4 of 18 races in the 2010 Grand Prix motorcycle racing season
- Date: 6 June 2010
- Official name: Gran Premio d'Italia TIM
- Location: Mugello Circuit
- Course: Permanent racing facility; 5.245 km (3.259 mi)

MotoGP
Pole position
- Rider: (Spain) Dani Pedrosa
- Time: 1:48.819
Fastest lap
- Rider: (Spain) Dani Pedrosa
- Time: 1:49.531
Podium
- First: (Spain) Dani Pedrosa
- Second: (Spain) Jorge Lorenzo
- Third: (Italy) Andrea Dovizioso

Moto2
Pole position
- Rider: (Italy) Andrea Iannone
- Time: 1:55.598
Fastest lap
- Rider: (Italy) Andrea Iannone
- Time: 1:55.647
Podium
- First: (Italy) Andrea Iannone
- Second: (Spain) Sergio Gadea
- Third: (Italy) Simone Corsi

125cc
Pole position
- Rider: (Germany) Sandro Cortese
- Time: 1:58.315
Fastest lap
- Rider: (United Kingdom) Bradley Smith
- Time: 1:58.009
Podium
- First: (Spain) Marc Márquez
- Second: (Spain) Nicolás Terol
- Third: (Spain) Pol Espargaró

The 2010 Italian motorcycle Grand Prix was the fourth round of the 2010 Grand Prix motorcycle racing season. It took place on the weekend of 4–6 June 2010 at the Mugello Circuit. Seven-time MotoGP world champion Valentino Rossi suffered a displaced compound fracture of his right tibia in free practice, after losing control of his Yamaha in one of the circuit's fast corners. The injury saw him lose any hope of retaining his 2008 and 2009 crowns.

Dani Pedrosa dominated the MotoGP event aboard his Honda, reaching the finish line well clear of chasing championship leader Jorge Lorenzo in second. Andrea Dovizioso took third, while ex-champion Casey Stoner took his Ducati to fourth on the final lap. The 125cc race saw the first victory of future multiple MotoGP world champion Marc Márquez.

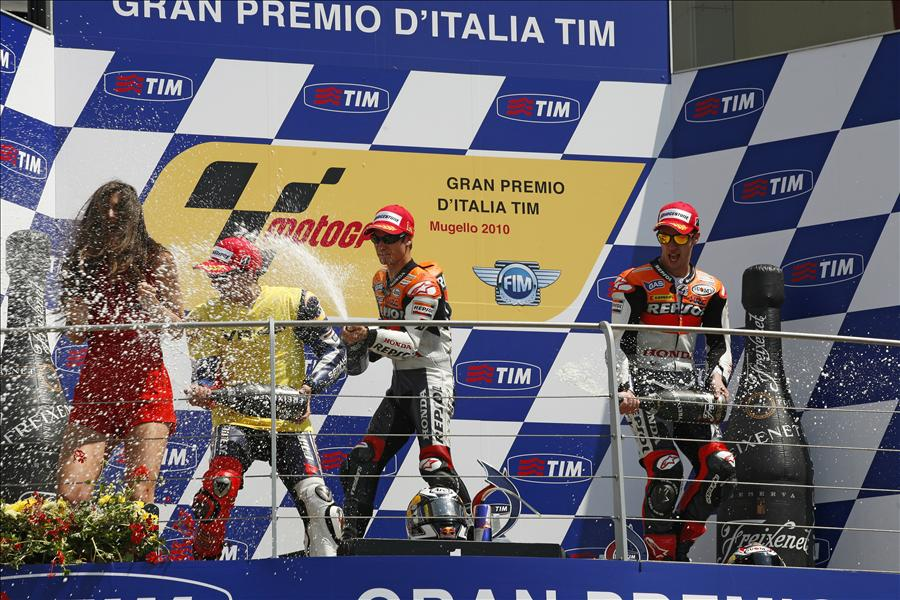
Jorge Lorenzo, Dani Pedrosa and Andrea Dovizioso, celebrating on the podium after finishing second, first and third at the MotoGP race. Lorenzo wears a shirt in honour of Valentino Rossi, who crashed and broke his leg in Free Practice 2, preventing him from starting the race.

== MotoGP classification ==
Pos.	No.	Rider	Team	Manufacturer	Laps	Time/Retired	Grid	Points
1	26	(Spain) Dani Pedrosa	Repsol Honda Team	Honda	23	42:28.066	1	25
2	99	(Spain) Jorge Lorenzo	Fiat Yamaha Team	Yamaha	23	+4.014	2	20
3	4	(Italy) Andrea Dovizioso	Repsol Honda Team	Honda	23	+6.196	8	16
4	27	(Australia) Casey Stoner	Ducati Marlboro Team	Ducati	23	+25.703	3	13
5	33	(Italy) Marco Melandri	San Carlo Honda Gresini	Honda	23	+25.735	14	11
6	14	(France) Randy de Puniet	LCR Honda MotoGP	Honda	23	+25.965	6	10
7	11	(United States) Ben Spies	Monster Yamaha Tech 3	Yamaha	23	+28.806	7	9
8	41	(Spain) Aleix Espargaró	Pramac Racing Team	Ducati	23	+40.172	9	8
9	58	(Italy) Marco Simoncelli	San Carlo Honda Gresini	Honda	23	+41.394	11	7
10	65	(Italy) Loris Capirossi	Rizla Suzuki MotoGP	Suzuki	23	+42.107	12	6
11	7	(Japan) Hiroshi Aoyama	Interwetten Honda MotoGP	Honda	23	+43.095	10	5
12	40	(Spain) Héctor Barberá	Páginas Amarillas Aspar	Ducati	23	+43.363	13	4
13	5	(United States) Colin Edwards	Monster Yamaha Tech 3	Yamaha	23	+1:14.393	5	3
14	19	(Spain) Álvaro Bautista	Rizla Suzuki MotoGP	Suzuki	23	+1:24.389	16	2
Ret	36	(Finland) Mika Kallio	Pramac Racing Team	Ducati	8	Accident	15	
Ret	69	(United States) Nicky Hayden	Ducati Marlboro Team	Ducati	5	Accident	4	
DNS	46	(Italy) Valentino Rossi	Fiat Yamaha Team	Yamaha		Did not start		

== Moto2 classification ==
Pos.	No.	Rider	Manufacturer	Laps	Time/Retired	Grid	Points
1	29	(Italy) Andrea Iannone	Speed Up	21	41:05.374	1	25
2	40	(Spain) Sergio Gadea	Pons Kalex	21	+2.764	6	20
3	3	(Italy) Simone Corsi	Motobi	21	+2.799	26	16
4	12	(Switzerland) Thomas Lüthi	Moriwaki	21	+2.814	9	13
5	24	(Spain) Toni Elías	Moriwaki	21	+3.404	2	11
6	48	(Japan) Shoya Tomizawa	Suter	21	+3.826	5	10
7	2	(Hungary) Gábor Talmácsi	Speed Up	21	+7.209	7	9
8	72	(Japan) Yuki Takahashi	Tech 3	21	+8.377	19	8
9	60	(Spain) Julián Simón	Suter	21	+8.584	10	7
10	6	(Spain) Alex Debón	FTR	21	+8.931	15	6
11	15	(San Marino) Alex de Angelis	Force GP210	21	+9.149	3	5
12	55	(Spain) Héctor Faubel	Suter	21	+9.991	12	4
13	25	(Italy) Alex Baldolini	I.C.P.	21	+12.219	11	3
14	65	(Germany) Stefan Bradl	Suter	21	+19.110	23	2
15	10	(Spain) Fonsi Nieto	Moriwaki	21	+19.680	35	1
16	77	(Switzerland) Dominique Aegerter	Suter	21	+19.994	29	
17	17	(Czech Republic) Karel Abraham	FTR	21	+24.969	20	
18	44	(Italy) Roberto Rolfo	Suter	21	+25.769	16	
19	19	(Belgium) Xavier Siméon	Moriwaki	21	+31.094	13	
20	68	(Colombia) Yonny Hernández	BQR-Moto2	21	+31.171	27	
21	45	(United Kingdom) Scott Redding	Suter	21	+37.770	28	
22	71	(Italy) Claudio Corti	Suter	21	+39.183	22	
23	53	(France) Valentin Debise	ADV	21	+39.405	37	
24	41	(Germany) Arne Tode	Suter	21	+40.613	18	
25	21	(Russia) Vladimir Leonov	Suter	21	+43.358	38	
26	9	(United States) Kenny Noyes	Promoharris	21	+43.997	33	
27	8	(Australia) Anthony West	MZ-RE Honda	21	+53.748	39	
28	59	(Italy) Niccolò Canepa	Force GP210	21	+54.387	31	
29	76	(Spain) Bernat Martínez	Bimota	21	+57.035	36	
30	88	(Spain) Yannick Guerra	Moriwaki	21	+58.612	40	
Ret	39	(Venezuela) Robertino Pietri	Suter	18	Accident	32	
Ret	14	(Thailand) Ratthapark Wilairot	Bimota	16	Accident	24	
Ret	63	(France) Mike Di Meglio	Suter	15	Accident	21	
Ret	61	(Ukraine) Vladimir Ivanov	Moriwaki	15	Retirement	30	
Ret	35	(Italy) Raffaele De Rosa	Tech 3	11	Accident	14	
Ret	75	(Italy) Mattia Pasini	Motobi	7	Accident	25	
Ret	16	(France) Jules Cluzel	Suter	4	Accident	4	
Ret	80	(Spain) Axel Pons	Pons Kalex	4	Retirement	8	
Ret	96	(France) Anthony Delhalle	BQR-Moto2	3	Accident	41	
Ret	52	(Czech Republic) Lukáš Pešek	Moriwaki	2	Accident	17	
DNS	5	(Spain) Joan Olivé	Promoharris	0	Did not start	34	
OFFICIAL MOTO2 REPORT

== 125 cc classification ==
Pos.	No.	Rider	Manufacturer	Laps	Time/Retired	Grid	Points
1	93	(Spain) Marc Márquez	Derbi	20	39:53.153	6	25
2	40	(Spain) Nicolás Terol	Aprilia	20	+0.039	4	20
3	44	(Spain) Pol Espargaró	Derbi	20	+0.116	2	16
4	38	(United Kingdom) Bradley Smith	Aprilia	20	+0.161	3	13
5	7	(Spain) Efrén Vázquez	Derbi	20	+10.281	8	11
6	35	(Switzerland) Randy Krummenacher	Aprilia	20	+10.364	5	10
7	12	(Spain) Esteve Rabat	Aprilia	20	+10.562	7	9
8	71	(Japan) Tomoyoshi Koyama	Aprilia	20	+36.341	10	8
9	14	(France) Johann Zarco	Aprilia	20	+36.411	9	7
10	99	(United Kingdom) Danny Webb	Aprilia	20	+36.730	13	6
11	94	(Germany) Jonas Folger	Aprilia	20	+36.775	23	5
12	5	(France) Alexis Masbou	Aprilia	20	+45.871	17	4
13	78	(Germany) Marcel Schrötter	Honda	20	+45.879	18	3
14	53	(Netherlands) Jasper Iwema	Aprilia	20	+45.895	11	2
15	15	(Italy) Simone Grotzkyj	Aprilia	20	+46.060	20	1
16	51	(Italy) Riccardo Moretti	Aprilia	20	+50.305	22	
17	84	(Czech Republic) Jakub Kornfeil	Aprilia	20	+50.789	21	
18	95	(Italy) Alessandro Tonucci	Aprilia	20	+53.145	15	
19	98	(Italy) Mattia Tarozzi	Aprilia	20	+1:19.447	26	
20	97	(Italy) Armando Pontone	Aprilia	20	+1:19.541	28	
21	63	(Malaysia) Zulfahmi Khairuddin	Aprilia	20	+1:19.545	27	
22	60	(Netherlands) Michael van der Mark	Lambretta	20	+1:21.764	29	
Ret	23	(Spain) Alberto Moncayo	Aprilia	16	Accident	14	
Ret	92	(Italy) Luigi Morciano	Aprilia	16	Accident	16	
Ret	69	(France) Louis Rossi	Aprilia	14	Accident	31	
Ret	50	(Norway) Sturla Fagerhaug	Aprilia	12	Retirement	19	
Ret	11	(Germany) Sandro Cortese	Derbi	7	Accident	1	
Ret	32	(Italy) Lorenzo Savadori	Aprilia	4	Retirement	25	
Ret	96	(Italy) Tommaso Gabrielli	Aprilia	3	Accident	24	
Ret	72	(Italy) Marco Ravaioli	Lambretta	3	Retirement	32	
Ret	87	(Italy) Luca Marconi	Aprilia	1	Retirement	30	
DNS	39	(Spain) Luis Salom	Aprilia	0	Did not start	12	
DNS	26	(Spain) Adrián Martín	Aprilia		Did not start		
OFFICIAL 125CC REPORT

== Championship standings after the race (MotoGP) ==
Below are the standings for the top five riders and constructors after round four has concluded.

Riders' Championship standings

Pos.	Rider	Points
1	(Spain) Jorge Lorenzo	90
2	(Spain) Dani Pedrosa	65
3	(Italy) Valentino Rossi	61
4	(Italy) Andrea Dovizioso	58
5	(United States) Nicky Hayden	39

Constructors' Championship standings

Pos.	Constructor	Points
1	(Japan) Yamaha	95
2	(Japan) Honda	77
3	(Italy) Ducati	52
4	(Japan) Suzuki	19

- Only the top five positions are included for both sets of standings.

Previous race: 2010 French Grand Prix	FIM Grand Prix World Championship; 2010 season	Next race: 2010 British Grand Prix
Previous race: 2009 Italian Grand Prix	Italian motorcycle Grand Prix	Next race: 2011 Italian Grand Prix
