= 2016 Argentine Republic motorcycle Grand Prix =

(Argentina) 2016 Argentine Republic Grand Prix
Race details
- Race 2 of 18 races in the 2016 Grand Prix motorcycle racing season
- Date: 3 April 2016
- Official name: Gran Premio Motul de la República Argentina
- Location: Autódromo Termas de Río Hondo
- Course: Permanent racing facility; 4.806 km (2.986 mi)

MotoGP
Pole position
Rider	(Spain) Marc Márquez	Honda
Time	1:39.411	
Fastest lap
Rider	(Spain) Marc Márquez	Honda
Time	1:40.243 on lap 12	
Podium
First	(Spain) Marc Márquez	Honda
Second	(Italy) Valentino Rossi	Yamaha
Third	(Spain) Dani Pedrosa	Honda

Moto2
Pole position
Rider	(United Kingdom) Sam Lowes	Kalex
Time	1:43.347	
Fastest lap
Rider	(France) Johann Zarco	Kalex
Time	1:44.345 on lap 23	
Podium
First	(France) Johann Zarco	Kalex
Second	(United Kingdom) Sam Lowes	Kalex
Third	(Germany) Jonas Folger	Kalex

Moto3
Pole position
Rider	(South Africa) Brad Binder	KTM
Time	1:49.767	
Fastest lap
Rider	(Spain) Joan Mir	KTM
Time	1:56.365 on lap 21	
Podium
First	(Malaysia) Khairul Idham Pawi	Honda
Second	(Spain) Jorge Navarro	Honda
Third	(South Africa) Brad Binder	KTM

The 2016 Argentine Republic motorcycle Grand Prix was the second round of the 2016 MotoGP season. It was held at the Autódromo Termas de Río Hondo in Santiago del Estero on 3 April 2016.

== Classification ==
=== MotoGP ===
Due to tyre safety concerns, the race distance was shortened from 25 to 20 laps with a compulsory mid-race bike change.

Pos.	No.	Rider	Team	Manufacturer	Laps	Time/Retired	Grid	Points
1	93	(Spain) Marc Márquez	Repsol Honda Team	Honda	20	34:13.628	1	25
2	46	(Italy) Valentino Rossi	Movistar Yamaha MotoGP	Yamaha	20	+7.679	2	20
3	26	(Spain) Dani Pedrosa	Repsol Honda Team	Honda	20	+28.100	4	16
4	50	(Republic of Ireland) Eugene Laverty	Aspar Team MotoGP	Ducati	20	+36.542	17	13
5	8	(Spain) Héctor Barberá	Avintia Racing	Ducati	20	+36.711	8	11
6	44	(Spain) Pol Espargaró	Monster Yamaha Tech 3	Yamaha	20	+37.245	10	10
7	6	(Germany) Stefan Bradl	Aprilia Racing Team Gresini	Aprilia	20	+41.353	16	9
8	38	(United Kingdom) Bradley Smith	Monster Yamaha Tech 3	Yamaha	20	+50.709	12	8
9	53	(Spain) Tito Rabat	Estrella Galicia 0,0 Marc VDS	Honda	20	+50.983	19	7
10	19	(Spain) Álvaro Bautista	Aprilia Racing Team Gresini	Aprilia	20	+1:01.388	20	6
11	41	(Spain) Aleix Espargaró	Team Suzuki Ecstar	Suzuki	20	+1:08.868	11	5
12	51	(Italy) Michele Pirro	Octo Pramac Yakhnich	Ducati	20	+1:18.987	18	4
13	4	(Italy) Andrea Dovizioso	Ducati Team	Ducati	20	+1:33.419	5	3
Ret	29	(Italy) Andrea Iannone	Ducati Team	Ducati	19	Accident	6	
Ret	35	(United Kingdom) Cal Crutchlow	LCR Honda	Honda	19	Accident	9	
Ret	25	(Spain) Maverick Viñales	Team Suzuki Ecstar	Suzuki	17	Accident	7	
Ret	45	(United Kingdom) Scott Redding	Octo Pramac Yakhnich	Ducati	15	Power Loss	14	
Ret	76	(France) Loris Baz	Avintia Racing	Ducati	12	Rear Tyre Vibration	13	
Ret	99	(Spain) Jorge Lorenzo	Movistar Yamaha MotoGP	Yamaha	5	Accident	3	
Ret	43	(Australia) Jack Miller	Estrella Galicia 0,0 Marc VDS	Honda	3	Accident	15	
Ret	68	(Colombia) Yonny Hernández	Aspar Team MotoGP	Ducati	2	Accident	21	

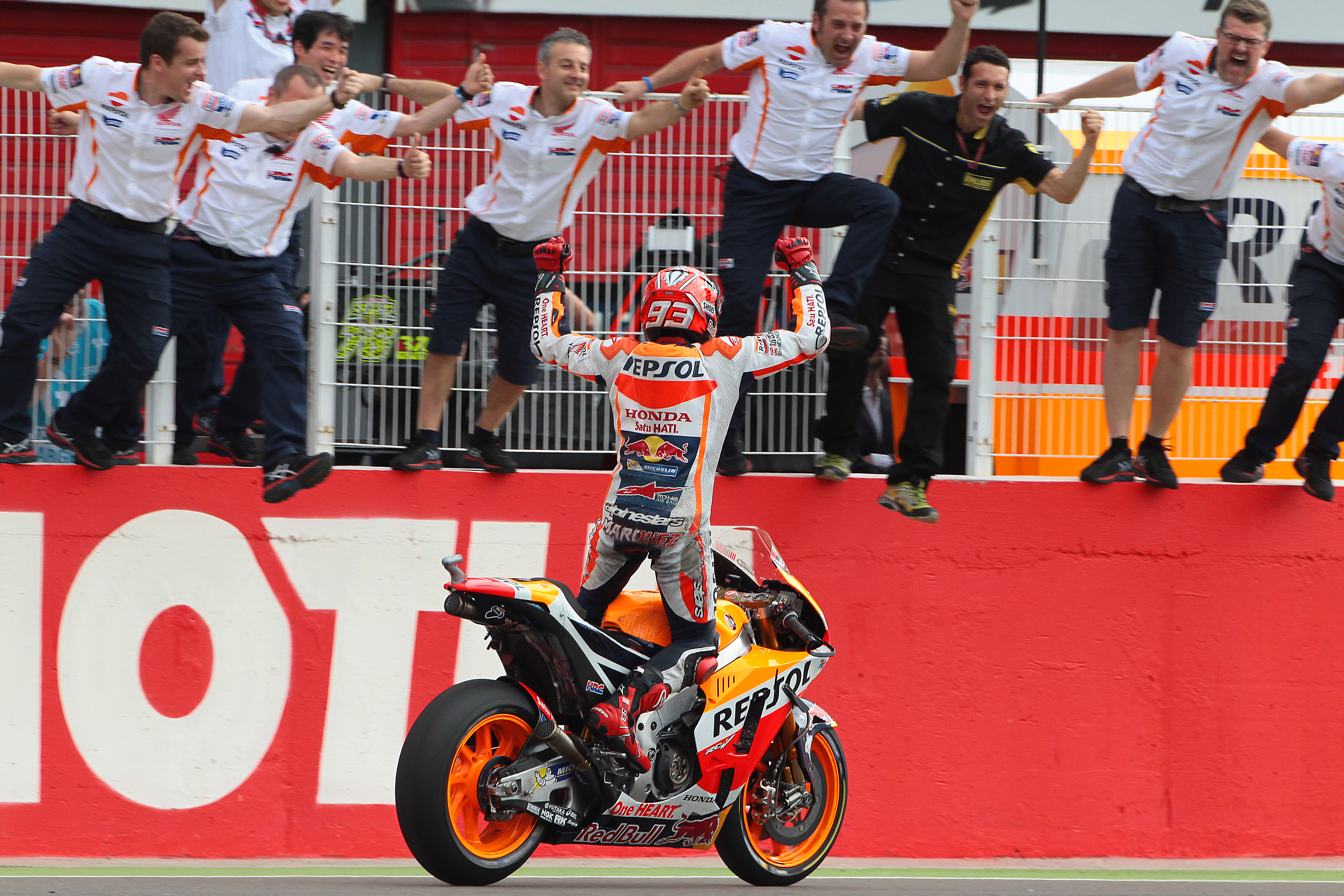
Marc Márquez, crossing the line to win the MotoGP race.

=== Moto2 ===
Pos.	No.	Rider	Manufacturer	Laps	Time/Retired	Grid	Points
1	5	(France) Johann Zarco	Kalex	23	40:57.806	2	25
2	22	(United Kingdom) Sam Lowes	Kalex	23	+1.347	1	20
3	94	(Germany) Jonas Folger	Kalex	23	+2.754	3	16
4	40	(Spain) Álex Rins	Kalex	23	+6.101	11	13
5	77	(Switzerland) Dominique Aegerter	Kalex	23	+17.384	19	11
6	55	(Malaysia) Hafizh Syahrin	Kalex	23	+17.484	12	10
7	12	(Switzerland) Thomas Lüthi	Kalex	23	+26.411	6	9
8	49	(Spain) Axel Pons	Kalex	23	+31.016	10	8
9	30	(Japan) Takaaki Nakagami	Kalex	23	+31.403	4	7
10	54	(Italy) Mattia Pasini	Kalex	23	+31.816	20	6
11	23	(Germany) Marcel Schrötter	Kalex	23	+32.329	16	5
12	19	(Belgium) Xavier Siméon	Speed Up	23	+40.968	17	4
13	7	(Italy) Lorenzo Baldassarri	Kalex	23	+47.883	9	3
14	97	(Spain) Xavi Vierge	Tech 3	23	+56.027	23	2
15	39	(Spain) Luis Salom	Kalex	23	+58.278	14	1
16	52	(United Kingdom) Danny Kent	Kalex	23	+58.437	8	
17	14	(Thailand) Ratthapark Wilairot	Kalex	23	+58.615	21	
18	10	(Italy) Luca Marini	Kalex	23	+59.245	22	
19	60	(Spain) Julián Simón	Speed Up	23	+59.535	24	
20	24	(Italy) Simone Corsi	Speed Up	23	+59.878	13	
21	44	(Portugal) Miguel Oliveira	Kalex	23	+1:00.406	18	
22	70	(Switzerland) Robin Mulhauser	Kalex	23	+1:09.254	26	
23	2	(Switzerland) Jesko Raffin	Kalex	23	+1:14.825	25	
24	32	(Spain) Isaac Viñales	Tech 3	23	+1:16.792	27	
25	21	(Italy) Franco Morbidelli	Kalex	23	+1:41.530	5	
26	8	(Spain) Efrén Vázquez	Suter	22	+1 lap	28	
27	33	(Italy) Alessandro Tonucci	Kalex	22	+1 lap	29	
Ret	11	(Germany) Sandro Cortese	Kalex	12	Accident	7	
Ret	73	(Spain) Álex Márquez	Kalex	1	Accident Damage	15	
DNS	57	(Spain) Edgar Pons	Kalex		Illness (Hepatitis A)		
OFFICIAL MOTO2 REPORT

=== Moto3 ===
Pos.	No.	Rider	Manufacturer	Laps	Time/Retired	Grid	Points
1	89	(Malaysia) Khairul Idham Pawi	Honda	21	41:35.452	7	25
2	9	(Spain) Jorge Navarro	Honda	21	+26.170	3	20
3	41	(South Africa) Brad Binder	KTM	21	+30.060	1	16
4	55	(Italy) Andrea Locatelli	KTM	21	+30.339	20	13
5	36	(Spain) Joan Mir	KTM	21	+30.506	5	11
6	76	(Japan) Hiroki Ono	Honda	21	+30.736	11	10
7	17	(United Kingdom) John McPhee	Peugeot	21	+32.493	28	9
8	88	(Spain) Jorge Martín	Mahindra	21	+40.596	19	8
9	84	(Czech Republic) Jakub Kornfeil	Honda	21	+45.667	14	7
10	23	(Italy) Niccolò Antonelli	Honda	21	+45.893	8	6
11	7	(Malaysia) Adam Norrodin	Honda	21	+46.173	17	5
12	58	(Spain) Juan Francisco Guevara	KTM	21	+51.434	12	4
13	20	(France) Fabio Quartararo	KTM	21	+57.893	9	3
14	6	(Spain) María Herrera	KTM	21	+1:05.983	25	2
15	65	(Germany) Philipp Öttl	KTM	21	+1:08.426	16	1
16	11	(Belgium) Livio Loi	Honda	21	+1:10.165	10	
17	33	(Italy) Enea Bastianini	Honda	21	+1:11.664	6	
18	8	(Italy) Nicolò Bulega	KTM	21	+1:11.791	4	
19	19	(Argentina) Gabriel Rodrigo	KTM	21	+1:12.151	18	
20	5	(Italy) Romano Fenati	KTM	21	+1:12.270	2	
21	10	(France) Alexis Masbou	Peugeot	21	+1:12.382	22	
22	64	(Netherlands) Bo Bendsneyder	KTM	21	+1:12.522	26	
23	21	(Italy) Francesco Bagnaia	Mahindra	21	+1:18.884	24	
24	98	(Czech Republic) Karel Hanika	Mahindra	21	+1:25.115	32	
25	4	(Italy) Fabio Di Giannantonio	Honda	21	+1:31.975	23	
26	95	(France) Jules Danilo	Honda	21	+1:38.400	21	
27	24	(Japan) Tatsuki Suzuki	Mahindra	21	+1:38.784	27	
28	43	(Italy) Stefano Valtulini	Mahindra	21	+1:39.051	33	
29	16	(Italy) Andrea Migno	KTM	21	+1:44.035	15	
30	40	(South Africa) Darryn Binder	Mahindra	20	+1 lap	29	
31	77	(Italy) Lorenzo Petrarca	Mahindra	20	+1 lap	30	
32	3	(Italy) Fabio Spiranelli	Mahindra	20	+1 lap	31	
Ret	44	(Spain) Arón Canet	Honda	18	Accident	13	
OFFICIAL MOTO3 REPORT

== Championship standings after the race (MotoGP) ==
Below are the standings for the top five riders and constructors after round two has concluded.

Riders' Championship standings

Pos.	Rider	Points
1	(Spain) Marc Marquez	41
2	(Italy) Valentino Rossi	33
3	(Spain) Dani Pedrosa	27
4	(Spain) Jorge Lorenzo	25
5	(Italy) Andrea Dovizioso	23

Constructors' Championship standings

Pos.	Constructor	Points
1	(Japan) Yamaha	45
2	(Japan) Honda	41
3	(Italy) Ducati	33
4	(Japan) Suzuki	15
5	(Italy) Aprilia	12

- Note: Only the top five positions are included for both sets of standings.

Previous race: 2016 Qatar Grand Prix	FIM Grand Prix World Championship; 2016 season	Next race: 2016 Grand Prix of the Americas
Previous race: 2015 Argentine Grand Prix	Argentine Republic motorcycle Grand Prix	Next race: 2017 Argentine Grand Prix
