= Luis Salom =

Spanish motorcycle racer (1991–2016)

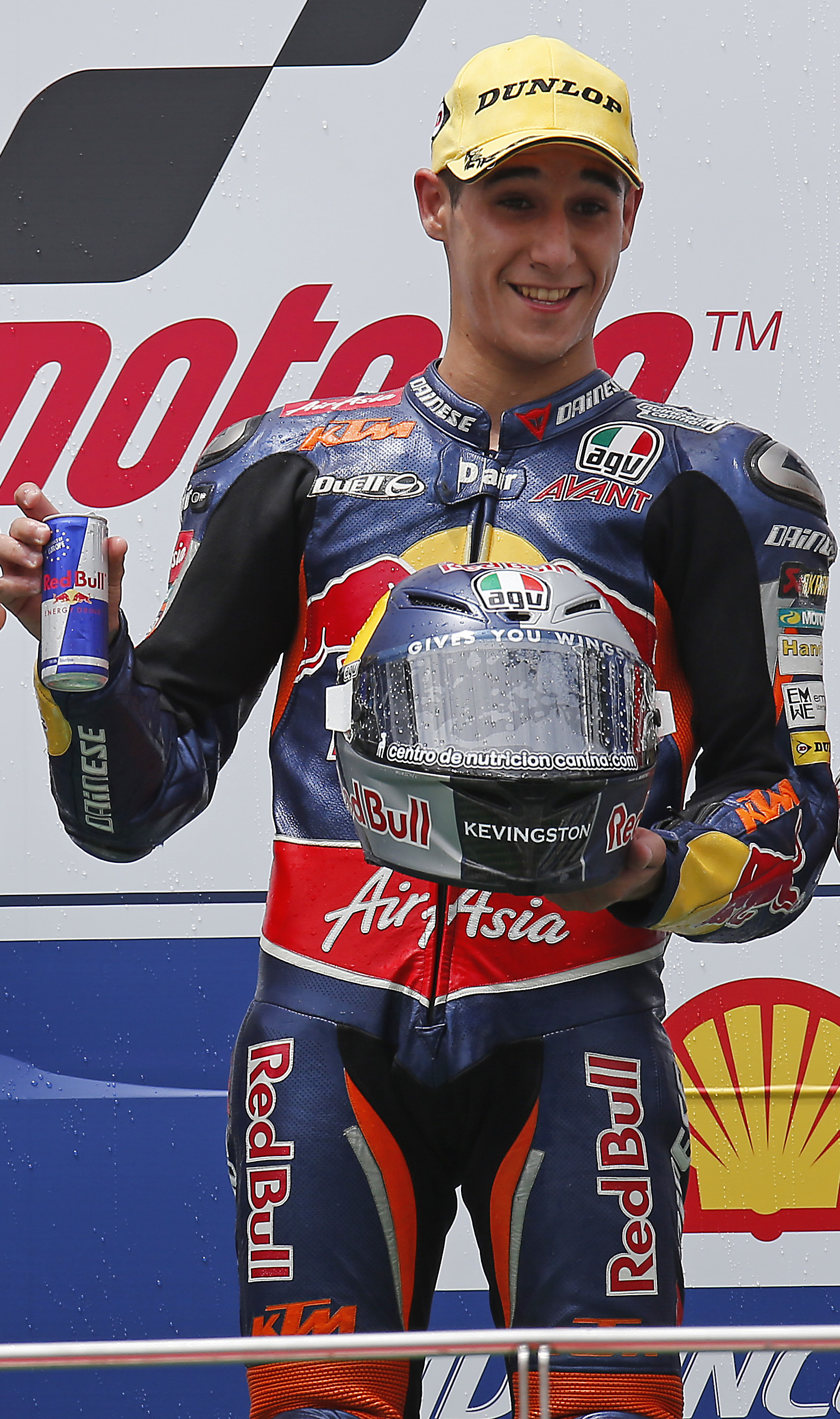
- Salom at the 2013 Malaysian Grand Prix
- Nationality: Spanish
- Born: 7 August 1991; Palma, Spain
- Died: 3 June 2016 (aged 24); Sant Cugat del Vallès, Spain
- Bike number: 39 (retired in honour in Moto2)
Motorcycle racing career statistics
Moto2 World Championship
Active years	2014–2016
Manufacturers	Kalex
Championships	0
2016 championship position	19th (37 pts)
Starts / Wins / Podiums / Poles / F. laps / Points; 41 / 0 / 3 / 0 / 1 / 202
Moto3 World Championship
Active years	2012–2013
Manufacturers	Kalex KTM, KTM
Championships	0
2013 championship position	3rd (302 pts)
Starts / Wins / Podiums / Poles / F. laps / Points; 34 / 9 / 20 / 4 / 6 / 516
125cc World Championship
Active years	2009–2011
Manufacturers	Honda, Lambretta, Aprilia
Championships	0
2011 championship position	8th (116 pts)
Starts / Wins / Podiums / Poles / F. laps / Points; 43 / 0 / 2 / 0 / 0 / 209

Luis Jaime Salom Horrach (7 August 1991 – 3 June 2016) was a Spanish Grand Prix motorcycle racer. Salom died after a practice accident in the home event, at Circuit de Catalunya, when making contact with his bike and the wall after a high-speed accident. Racing in the Moto2 class since 2014, he finished 41 races, with three podium appearances, including a second-place finish at the 2016 Qatar season opener. At the time of his death, Salom ranked tenth in the 2016 Moto2 Championship point standings. Previously, he had competed in Moto3, accumulating nine race victories, finishing second and third in the 2012 and 2013 championships, respectively.

== Career ==
=== Early career ===
Born in Palma de Mallorca, Salom started racing competitively from the age of eight, winning the 50 cc Balearic Supermotard championship. He progressed up into 125cc championships from 2005 onwards, again becoming Balearic champion for two years in succession, before moving into the CEV Buckler championship in 2007.

In his first full season in the national championship, Salom finished seventh in the series, with a single podium coming in Catalunya. He also took part in the Red Bull Rookies Cup in 2007, taking fourth place in the championship thanks to a win at Assen and second at Jerez. He continued in the series in 2008, where he would win four of the first five races of the season, to hold a 13-point lead over J. D. Beach. Beach would overhaul Salom by four points by season's end, after Salom retired from races at the Sachsenring and Brno. He also finished second to Efrén Vázquez in the CEV Buckler championship.

=== 125cc World Championship ===
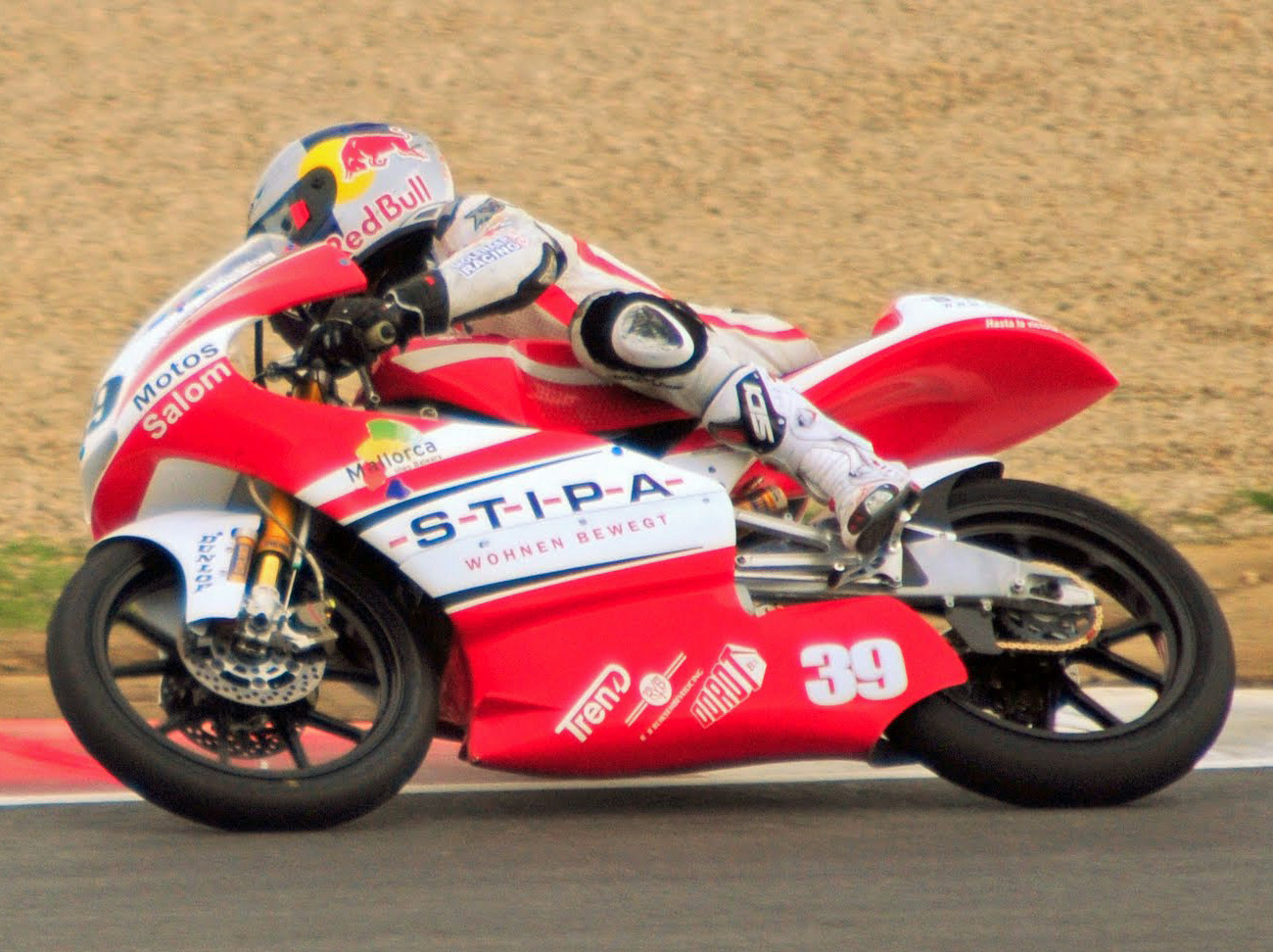
Luis Salom 2010 Silverstone

Salom made his Grand Prix début in a wildcard appearance at the Spanish Grand Prix, finishing 23rd. After another wildcard appearance in Catalunya, Salom moved into the championship full-time, replacing Simone Corsi at the WRB team. In 12 races, Salom amassed 21 points on the Aprilia with sixth at Donington being his best result.

Salom moved to the Lambretta team for the 2010 season. After amassing Lambretta's only point of the season at Jerez, Salom moved to Stipa-Molenaar Racing for the rest of the season, where he would add a further 71 points to his tally, including nine top-ten finishes to enable him to finish 12th in the championship.

=== Moto3 World Championship ===
Salom won his first Grand Prix in Indianapolis in 2012, beating Sandro Cortese and Maverick Viñales in a last-lap fight. He also won at Aragon. He finished the championship in second behind Cortese.

Salom went to Red Bull KTM Ajo for the 2013 season. He dominated most of the season, finishing the first eight races on the podium, including four wins, and led the points standings from Catalunya onwards. In a heavy crash during qualifying for the Indianapolis Grand Prix he broke his heel, but continued to race injured to keep the championship battle in his favour. He finished the race in fifth place, his worst result of the season up to that point and the first time he was off the podium all year. Despite the injury he won the next two races at Brno and Silverstone to extend his points lead before being able to rest his foot and recover. However, his championship hopes were put in serious jeopardy at Motegi where he was the innocent victim of a crash by Isaac Viñales, cousin of title rival Maverick Viñales, when he ran in third place. After remounting he eventually had to retire from the race after a second fall, giving Maverick Viñales and Álex Rins the chance to catch up. Rins later also crashed out, but Viñales finished second, making up decisive 20 points after being on the brink of being out of the championship battle altogether before the last race of the season. At the final round in Valencia, only five points covered the top three riders with Salom leading, but he eventually crashed out and rejoined the race far behind, leaving Rins and Viñales to fight for the title until the last corner. Salom crossed the line in 14th and recorded the fastest lap of the race, but only finished third in the final standings despite scoring the most wins of the season.

=== Moto2 World Championship ===
Salom signed a contract with Pons Racing that lasted until the end of 2015 to race with former title rival Maverick Viñales. Then during the events in Qatar and Austin, he only scored two points. During the Catalan Grand Prix, he suffered a crash with Jonas Folger, putting both of them out of the race. Salom was taken to hospital after the race, and underwent surgery on a broken right arm.

In 2016, Salom moved to SAG Racing Team partnering with Jesko Raffin. At Qatar, Salom finished the race in second place.

== Death ==
The course as configured after the crash until 2017 to reduce turn 13 speeds.

On 3 June 2016, with 25 minutes to go during Free Practice 2 for the 2016 Catalan Moto2 Grand Prix, Salom crashed at Europcar (turn 13), resulting in the session being red-flagged. The accident was not recorded by MotoGP cameras, but a security camera near turn 13 managed to capture video of the accident. His bike hit the air fence and bounced upwards, while Salom (who had let go of his bike) slid underneath resulting in him being directly in the crashing bike's path. Salom was rushed to Hospital General de Catalunya, where he died during surgery from injuries sustained in the crash.

As a result of his death, the race used the layout normally used by Formula One, to reduce speeds in the part of the track where Salom had crashed. Salom's death was the first during a world championship since Italian premier class rider Marco Simoncelli's fatal crash at Sepang during the 2011 Shell Advance Malaysian Grand Prix (which was abandoned and declared a non-event by the FIM). Further modifications with the chicane location were announced at the end of the 2016 season, with a new motorcycle-only chicane installed before the car chicane. However, safety issues proved to be an issue and that chicane was not used by MotoGP, with the car chicane used.

The SAG Team that Salom had ridden believed the front of the bike lost control whilst braking over a bump at turn 12. However, telemetry that was provided to MotoGP in an investigation showed that due to a low acceleration at the exit out of turn 11, he had applied the brakes nine metres later than usual, in order to maintain a proper corner speed at turn 12. As a result, he was still on the brakes when he hit an irregularity on the asphalt, as opposed to previous laps where he already had released the brakes on that spot. The stress this produced on the front tyre, caused a loss of grip over the irregularity, resulting in the crash.

During the 2016 FIM MotoGP Awards, it was announced that Salom's number, #39, will be retired in the Moto2 class as a tribute.

== Career statistics ==
=== Red Bull MotoGP Rookies Cup ===
==== Races by year ====
(key) (Races in bold indicate pole position, races in italics indicate fastest lap)

Year	1	2	3	4	5	6	7	8	9	10	Pos	Pts
2007	**SPA**; 2	ITA; Ret	GBR; Ret	NED; 1	GER; Ret	CZE; 4	POR; 7	VAL; 4			4th	80
2008	**SPA1**; 1	**SPA2**; 1	POR; 4	**FRA**; 1	ITA; 1	GBR; 9	NED; 7	**GER**; Ret	CZE1; Ret	CZE2; 3	2nd	145

=== Grand Prix motorcycle racing ===
==== By season ====
Season	Class	Motorcycle	Team	Number	Race	Win	Podium	Pole	FLap	Pts	Plcd
2009	125cc	Honda	SAG - Castrol	39	12	0	0	0	0	21	22nd
2009	125cc	Aprilia	Jack & Jones Team	39	12	0	0	0	0	21	22nd
2010	125cc	Lambretta	Lambretta Reparto Corse	39	16	0	0	0	0	72	12th
2010	125cc	Aprilia	Stipa - Molenaar Racing GP	39	16	0	0	0	0	72	12th
2011	125cc	Aprilia	RW Racing GP	39	15	0	2	0	0	116	8th
2012	Moto3	Kalex KTM	RW Racing GP	39	17	2	8	0	1	214	**2nd**
2013	Moto3	KTM	Red Bull KTM Ajo	39	17	7	12	4	5	302	**3rd**
2014	Moto2	Kalex	Paginas Amarillas HP 40	39	18	0	2	0	1	85	8th
2015	Moto2	Kalex	Paginas Amarillas HP 40	39	17	0	0	0	0	80	13th
2016	Moto2	Kalex	SAG Team	39	6	0	1	0	0	37	19th
Total					**118**	**9**	**25**	**4**	**7**	**927**	

==== By class ====
Class	Seasons	1st GP	1st Pod	1st Win	Race	Win	Podiums	Pole	FLap	Pts	WChmp
125cc	2009–2011	2009 Spain	2011 Netherlands		43	0	2	0	0	209	0
Moto3	2012–2013	2012 Qatar	2012 Spain	2012 Indianapolis	34	9	20	4	6	516	0
Moto2	2014–2016	2014 Qatar	2014 Argentina		41	0	3	0	1	202	0
Total	2009–2016					**9**	**25**	**4**	**7**	**927**	**0**

==== Races by year ====
(key) (Races in bold indicate pole position, races in italics indicate fastest lap)

Year	Class	Bike	1	2	3	4	5	6	7	8	9	10	11	12	13	14	15	16	17	18	Pos	Pts
2009	125cc	Honda	QAT	JPN	SPA; 23	FRA	ITA	CAT; Ret													22nd	21
2009	125cc	Aprilia							NED; 16	GER; 13	GBR; 6	CZE; Ret	INP; 13	RSM; 21	POR; 15	AUS; 19	MAL; 15	VAL; 13			22nd	21
2010	125cc	Lambretta	QAT; Ret	SPA; 15																	12th	72
2010	125cc	Aprilia			FRA; 10	ITA; DNS	GBR; Ret	NED; 8	CAT; Ret	GER; Ret	CZE; 10	INP; 12	RSM; Ret	ARA; 10	JPN; 8	MAL; 8	AUS; 8	POR; 5	VAL; 10		12th	72
2011	125cc	Aprilia	QAT; 8	SPA; Ret	POR; 8	FRA; 10	CAT; Ret	GBR; 4	NED; 2	ITA; 6	GER; 5	CZE; DNS	INP	RSM; Ret	ARA; 5	JPN; 23	AUS; 2	MAL; Ret	VAL; 7		8th	116
2012	Moto3	Kalex KTM	QAT; 4	SPA; 2	POR; 3	FRA; Ret	CAT; 10	GBR; 2	NED; 4	GER; 3	ITA; Ret	INP; 1	CZE; 2	RSM; 2	ARA; 1	JPN; Ret	MAL; 4	AUS; 15	VAL; 10		**2nd**	**214**
2013	Moto3	KTM	**QAT**; 1	AME; 3	SPA; 2	FRA; 3	ITA; 1	**CAT**; 1	NED; 1	GER; 2	INP; 5	CZE; 1	GBR; 1	RSM; 4	ARA; 4	**MAL**; 1	**AUS**; 3	JPN; Ret	VAL; 14		**3rd**	**302**
2014	Moto2	Kalex	QAT; 14	AME; Ret	ARG; 3	SPA; 6	FRA; 5	ITA; 2	CAT; Ret	NED; 15	GER; 14	INP; 26	CZE; Ret	GBR; 19	RSM; 15	ARA; 13	JPN; 15	AUS; 17	MAL; 11	VAL; 4	8th	85
2015	Moto2	Kalex	QAT; Ret	AME; 27	ARG; 11	SPA; 7	FRA; Ret	ITA; 5	CAT; 5	NED; DNS	GER; 17	INP; 16	CZE; 9	GBR; 17	RSM; 9	ARA; Ret	JPN; Ret	AUS; 6	MAL; 6	VAL; 6	13th	80
2016	Moto2	Kalex	QAT; 2	ARG; 15	AME; 13	SPA; 9	FRA; 10	ITA; Ret	CAT; DNS	NED	GER	AUT	CZE	GBR	RSM	ARA	JPN	AUS	MAL	VAL	19th	37
