= 2010 Qatar motorcycle Grand Prix =

First round of the 2010 FIM Road Racing World Championship season

2010 Qatar Grand Prix
Race details
- Race 1 of 18 races in the 2010 Grand Prix motorcycle racing season
- Date: 11 April 2010
- Official name: Commercialbank Grand Prix of Qatar
- Location: Losail International Circuit
- Course: Permanent racing facility; 5.380 km (3.343 mi)

MotoGP
Pole position
- Rider: (Australia) Casey Stoner
- Time: 1:55.007
Fastest lap
- Rider: (Australia) Casey Stoner
- Time: 1:55.537
Podium
- First: (Italy) Valentino Rossi
- Second: (Spain) Jorge Lorenzo
- Third: (Italy) Andrea Dovizioso

Moto2
Pole position
- Rider: (Spain) Toni Elías
- Time: 2:01.904
Fastest lap
- Rider: (Switzerland) Thomas Lüthi
- Time: 2:02.537
Podium
- First: (Japan) Shoya Tomizawa
- Second: (Spain) Alex Debón
- Third: (France) Jules Cluzel

125cc
Pole position
- Rider: (Spain) Marc Márquez
- Time: 2:06.651
Fastest lap
- Rider: (Spain) Nicolás Terol
- Time: 2:06.674
Podium
- First: (Spain) Nicolás Terol
- Second: (Spain) Efrén Vázquez
- Third: (Spain) Marc Márquez

The 2010 Qatar motorcycle Grand Prix, officially the Commercialbank Grand Prix of Qatar, was the opening round of the 2010 MotoGP championship. It took place on the weekend of 9–11 April 2010 at the Losail International Circuit located in Doha, Qatar. Spectator attendance was 7302. Defending world champion Valentino Rossi won the opening MotoGP race after Casey Stoner crashed while in the lead, ending his undefeated streak from 2007. This was also the first race for the newly formed Moto2 class, which was introduced as a replacement for the 250cc two-stroke class. All bikes in this class were powered with 600cc four-stroke engines based on the Honda CBR600RR. This event was also known for Shoya Tomizawa's first and only Grand Prix win before he was killed in an accident at the 2010 San Marino motorcycle Grand Prix.

== MotoGP classification ==
Pos.	No.	Rider	Team	Manufacturer	Laps	Time/Retired	Grid	Points
1	46	(Italy) Valentino Rossi	Fiat Yamaha Team	Yamaha	22	42:50.099	2	25
2	99	(Spain) Jorge Lorenzo	Fiat Yamaha Team	Yamaha	22	+1.022	3	20
3	4	(Italy) Andrea Dovizioso	Repsol Honda Team	Honda	22	+1.865	6	16
4	69	(United States) Nicky Hayden	Ducati Marlboro Team	Ducati	22	+1.876	9	13
5	11	(United States) Ben Spies	Monster Yamaha Tech 3	Yamaha	22	+3.903	11	11
6	14	(France) Randy de Puniet	LCR Honda MotoGP	Honda	22	+9.322	4	10
7	26	(Spain) Dani Pedrosa	Repsol Honda Team	Honda	22	+16.508	7	9
8	5	(United States) Colin Edwards	Monster Yamaha Tech 3	Yamaha	22	+19.867	8	8
9	65	(Italy) Loris Capirossi	Rizla Suzuki MotoGP	Suzuki	22	+20.893	5	7
10	7	(Japan) Hiroshi Aoyama	Interwetten Honda MotoGP	Honda	22	+21.100	10	6
11	58	(Italy) Marco Simoncelli	San Carlo Honda Gresini	Honda	22	+31.638	15	5
12	40	(Spain) Héctor Barberá	Páginas Amarillas Aspar	Ducati	22	+32.573	16	4
13	33	(Italy) Marco Melandri	San Carlo Honda Gresini	Honda	22	+40.780	17	3
Ret	19	(Spain) Álvaro Bautista	Rizla Suzuki MotoGP	Suzuki	21	Accident	13	
Ret	41	(Spain) Aleix Espargaró	Pramac Racing Team	Ducati	7	Retirement	14	
Ret	27	(Australia) Casey Stoner	Ducati Marlboro Team	Ducati	5	Accident	1	
Ret	36	(Finland) Mika Kallio	Pramac Racing Team	Ducati	2	Accident	12	

== Moto2 classification ==
Pos.	No.	Rider	Manufacturer	Laps	Time/Retired	Grid	Points
1	48	(Japan) Shoya Tomizawa	Suter	20	41:11.768	9	25
2	6	(Spain) Alex Debón	FTR	20	+4.656	8	20
3	16	(France) Jules Cluzel	Suter	20	+4.789	6	16
4	24	(Spain) Toni Elías	Moriwaki	20	+6.978	1	13
5	44	(Italy) Roberto Rolfo	Suter	20	+7.178	12	11
6	75	(Italy) Mattia Pasini	Motobi	20	+11.804	18	10
7	12	(Switzerland) Thomas Lüthi	Moriwaki	20	+11.861	16	9
8	3	(Italy) Simone Corsi	Motobi	20	+12.346	26	8
9	2	(Hungary) Gábor Talmácsi	Speed Up	20	+13.821	14	7
10	40	(Spain) Sergio Gadea	Pons Kalex	20	+20.189	11	6
11	77	(Switzerland) Dominique Aegerter	Suter	20	+21.289	20	5
12	25	(Italy) Alex Baldolini	I.C.P.	20	+21.360	10	4
13	10	(Spain) Fonsi Nieto	Moriwaki	20	+21.835	24	3
14	17	(Czech Republic) Karel Abraham	RSV	20	+21.973	23	2
15	52	(Czech Republic) Lukáš Pešek	Moriwaki	20	+26.265	25	1
16	63	(France) Mike Di Meglio	RSV	20	+26.265	13	
17	14	(Thailand) Ratthapark Wilairot	Bimota	20	+26.599	19	
18	9	(United States) Kenny Noyes	Promoharris	20	+33.833	30	
19	29	(Italy) Andrea Iannone	Speed Up	20	+33.895	21	
20	71	(Italy) Claudio Corti	Suter	20	+40.992	28	
21	41	(Germany) Arne Tode	Suter	20	+43.119	22	
22	55	(Spain) Héctor Faubel	Suter	20	+43.249	32	
23	45	(United Kingdom) Scott Redding	Suter	20	+45.397	17	
24	53	(France) Valentin Debise	ADV	20	+46.472	29	
25	96	(France) Anthony Delhalle	BQR-Moto2	20	+51.157	38	
26	61	(Ukraine) Vladimir Ivanov	Moriwaki	20	+54.252	33	
27	59	(Italy) Niccolò Canepa	Force GP210	20	+54.631	15	
28	39	(Venezuela) Robertino Pietri	Suter	20	+1:15.976	36	
29	76	(Spain) Bernat Martínez	Bimota	20	+1:16.222	41	
30	88	(Spain) Yannick Guerra	Moriwaki	20	+1:20.651	40	
31	95	(Qatar) Mashel Al Naimi	BQR-Moto2	20	+1:20.719	37	
32	5	(Spain) Joan Olivé	Promoharris	20	+1:41.990	34	
Ret	8	(Australia) Anthony West	MZ-RE Honda	8	Accident	39	
Ret	72	(Japan) Yuki Takahashi	Tech 3	7	Accident	5	
Ret	21	(Russia) Vladimir Leonov	Suter	7	Accident	35	
Ret	68	(Colombia) Yonny Hernández	BQR-Moto2	3	Retirement	27	
Ret	80	(Spain) Axel Pons	Pons Kalex	3	Accident	31	
Ret	35	(Italy) Raffaele De Rosa	Tech 3	2	Accident	7	
Ret	15	(San Marino) Alex de Angelis	Force GP210	0	Accident	4	
Ret	60	(Spain) Julián Simón	RSV	0	Retirement	2	
Ret	65	(Germany) Stefan Bradl	Suter	0	Accident	3	
OFFICIAL MOTO2 REPORT

== 125 cc classification ==
Pos.	No.	Rider	Manufacturer	Laps	Time/Retired	Grid	Points
1	40	(Spain) Nicolás Terol	Aprilia	18	38:25.644	3	25
2	7	(Spain) Efrén Vázquez	Derbi	18	+2.395	4	20
3	93	(Spain) Marc Márquez	Derbi	18	+2.420	1	16
4	44	(Spain) Pol Espargaró	Derbi	18	+2.840	2	13
5	11	(Germany) Sandro Cortese	Derbi	18	+3.526	7	11
6	35	(Switzerland) Randy Krummenacher	Aprilia	18	+3.569	5	10
7	12	(Spain) Esteve Rabat	Aprilia	18	+3.692	10	9
8	38	(United Kingdom) Bradley Smith	Aprilia	18	+13.719	9	8
9	71	(Japan) Tomoyoshi Koyama	Aprilia	18	+14.337	6	7
10	5	(France) Alexis Masbou	Aprilia	18	+15.917	8	6
11	99	(United Kingdom) Danny Webb	Aprilia	18	+28.744	13	5
12	14	(France) Johann Zarco	Aprilia	18	+35.667	11	4
13	23	(Spain) Alberto Moncayo	Aprilia	18	+36.831	14	3
14	53	(Netherlands) Jasper Iwema	Aprilia	18	+36.854	12	2
15	94	(Germany) Jonas Folger	Aprilia	18	+38.899	18	1
16	78	(Germany) Marcel Schrötter	Honda	18	+38.991	15	
17	69	(France) Louis Rossi	Aprilia	18	+42.056	19	
18	50	(Norway) Sturla Fagerhaug	Aprilia	18	+51.351	16	
19	84	(Czech Republic) Jakub Kornfeil	Aprilia	18	+56.496	21	
20	26	(Spain) Adrián Martín	Aprilia	18	+56.750	20	
21	63	(Malaysia) Zulfahmi Khairuddin	Aprilia	18	+1:21.998	17	
22	87	(Italy) Luca Marconi	Aprilia	18	+1:32.074	24	
23	80	(France) Quentin Jacquet	Aprilia	18	+1:52.842	25	
Ret	72	(Italy) Marco Ravaioli	Lambretta	4	Retirement	26	
Ret	39	(Spain) Luis Salom	Lambretta	2	Retirement	23	
Ret	32	(Italy) Lorenzo Savadori	Aprilia	0	Retirement	22	
OFFICIAL 125CC REPORT

== Championship standings after the race (MotoGP) ==
Below are the standings for the top five riders and constructors after round one has concluded.

Riders' Championship standings

Pos.	Rider	Points
1	(Italy) Valentino Rossi	25
2	(Spain) Jorge Lorenzo	20
3	(Italy) Andrea Dovizioso	16
4	(United States) Nicky Hayden	13
5	(United States) Ben Spies	11

Constructors' Championship standings

Pos.	Constructor	Points
1	(Japan) Yamaha	25
2	(Japan) Honda	16
3	(Italy) Ducati	13
4	(Japan) Suzuki	7

- Note: Only the top five positions are included for both sets of standings.

Previous race: 2009 Valencian Grand Prix	FIM Grand Prix World Championship; 2010 season	Next race: 2010 Spanish Grand Prix
Previous race: 2009 Qatar Grand Prix	Qatar motorcycle Grand Prix	Next race: 2011 Qatar Grand Prix
