= 2010 Spanish motorcycle Grand Prix =

2nd round of the 2010 FIM Road Racing World Championship season

(Spain) 2010 Spanish Grand Prix
Race details
- Race 2 of 18 races in the 2010 Grand Prix motorcycle racing season
- Date: 2 May 2010
- Official name: Gran Premio bwin de España
- Location: Circuito de Jerez
- Course: Permanent racing facility; 4.423 km (2.748 mi)

MotoGP
Pole position
- Rider: (Spain) Dani Pedrosa
- Time: 1:39.202
Fastest lap
- Rider: (Spain) Dani Pedrosa
- Time: 1:39.731
Podium
- First: (Spain) Jorge Lorenzo
- Second: (Spain) Dani Pedrosa
- Third: (Italy) Valentino Rossi

Moto2
Pole position
- Rider: (Japan) Shoya Tomizawa
- Time: 1:44.372
Fastest lap
- Rider: (Spain) Toni Elías
- Time: 1:44.710
Podium
- First: (Spain) Toni Elías
- Second: (Japan) Shoya Tomizawa
- Third: (Switzerland) Thomas Lüthi

125cc
Pole position
- Rider: (Spain) Marc Márquez
- Time: 1:46.829
Fastest lap
- Rider: (Germany) Sandro Cortese
- Time: 1:47.493
Podium
- First: (Spain) Pol Espargaró
- Second: (Spain) Nicolás Terol
- Third: (Spain) Esteve Rabat

The 2010 Spanish motorcycle Grand Prix, officially the Gran Premio bwin de España, was the second round of the 2010 Grand Prix motorcycle racing season. It took place on the weekend of 30 April–2 May 2010 at the Circuito de Jerez located in Jerez de la Frontera, Spain. Jorge Lorenzo snatched a last-lap win in the MotoGP race to move top of the world championship standings.

This event would be the last podium for Japanese Moto2 rider, Shoya Tomizawa; who finished in second place, before his death on 5 September 2010 at the San Marino Grand Prix.

== MotoGP classification ==
Pos.	No.	Rider	Team	Manufacturer	Laps	Time/Retired	Grid	Points
1	99	(Spain) Jorge Lorenzo	Fiat Yamaha Team	Yamaha	27	45:17.538	2	25
2	26	(Spain) Dani Pedrosa	Repsol Honda Team	Honda	27	+0.543	1	20
3	46	(Italy) Valentino Rossi	Fiat Yamaha Team	Yamaha	27	+0.890	4	16
4	69	(United States) Nicky Hayden	Ducati Marlboro Team	Ducati	27	+9.015	5	13
5	27	(Australia) Casey Stoner	Ducati Marlboro Team	Ducati	27	+10.034	3	11
6	4	(Italy) Andrea Dovizioso	Repsol Honda Team	Honda	27	+23.144	9	10
7	36	(Finland) Mika Kallio	Pramac Racing Team	Ducati	27	+34.489	17	9
8	33	(Italy) Marco Melandri	San Carlo Honda Gresini	Honda	27	+34.687	10	8
9	14	(France) Randy de Puniet	LCR Honda MotoGP	Honda	27	+36.160	6	7
10	19	(Spain) Álvaro Bautista	Rizla Suzuki MotoGP	Suzuki	27	+36.791	13	6
11	58	(Italy) Marco Simoncelli	San Carlo Honda Gresini	Honda	27	+37.155	16	5
12	5	(United States) Colin Edwards	Monster Yamaha Tech 3	Yamaha	27	+38.260	7	4
13	40	(Spain) Héctor Barberá	Páginas Amarillas Aspar	Ducati	27	+38.371	14	3
14	7	(Japan) Hiroshi Aoyama	Interwetten Honda MotoGP	Honda	27	+1:02.052	12	2
15	41	(Spain) Aleix Espargaró	Pramac Racing Team	Ducati	24	+3 laps	15	1
Ret	11	(United States) Ben Spies	Monster Yamaha Tech 3	Yamaha	7	Retirement	8	
Ret	65	(Italy) Loris Capirossi	Rizla Suzuki MotoGP	Suzuki	2	Accident	11	

== Moto2 classification ==
The Moto2 race was red-flagged on the second lap after a fluid spill caused many riders to fall in the same turn. The race was later restarted, with the distance shortened to 17 laps from the original 26.

Pos.	No.	Rider	Manufacturer	Laps	Time/Retired	Grid	Points
1	24	(Spain) Toni Elías	Moriwaki	17	29:58.726	3	25
2	48	(Japan) Shoya Tomizawa	Suter	17	+0.190	1	20
3	12	(Switzerland) Thomas Lüthi	Moriwaki	17	+0.261	5	16
4	72	(Japan) Yuki Takahashi	Tech 3	17	+0.558	4	13
5	3	(Italy) Simone Corsi	Motobi	17	+1.449	10	11
6	40	(Spain) Sergio Gadea	Pons Kalex	17	+1.496	8	10
7	9	(United States) Kenny Noyes	Promoharris	17	+2.215	9	9
8	60	(Spain) Julián Simón	RSV	17	+2.576	2	8
9	2	(Hungary) Gábor Talmácsi	Speed Up	17	+3.825	7	7
10	68	(Colombia) Yonny Hernández	BQR-Moto2	17	+6.691	12	6
11	16	(France) Jules Cluzel	Suter	17	+8.123	14	5
12	44	(Italy) Roberto Rolfo	Suter	17	+11.965	17	4
13	77	(Switzerland) Dominique Aegerter	Suter	17	+12.190	21	3
14	65	(Germany) Stefan Bradl	Suter	17	+12.295	6	2
15	8	(Australia) Anthony West	MZ-RE Honda	17	+12.545	11	1
16	45	(United Kingdom) Scott Redding	Suter	17	+12.678	26	
17	14	(Thailand) Ratthapark Wilairot	Bimota	17	+13.548	29	
18	71	(Italy) Claudio Corti	Suter	17	+15.642	16	
19	80	(Spain) Axel Pons	Pons Kalex	17	+16.740	22	
20	35	(Italy) Raffaele De Rosa	Tech 3	17	+19.368	15	
21	10	(Spain) Fonsi Nieto	Moriwaki	17	+20.956	18	
22	63	(France) Mike Di Meglio	RSV	17	+21.129	27	
23	61	(Ukraine) Vladimir Ivanov	Moriwaki	17	+31.224	34	
24	39	(Venezuela) Robertino Pietri	Suter	17	+31.275	30	
25	6	(Spain) Alex Debón	FTR	17	+33.283	13	
26	52	(Czech Republic) Lukáš Pešek	Moriwaki	17	+34.090	32	
27	76	(Spain) Bernat Martínez	Bimota	17	+38.705	31	
28	17	(Czech Republic) Karel Abraham	RSV	17	+39.384	25	
29	41	(Germany) Arne Tode	Suter	17	+43.839	23	
30	92	(Spain) Amadeo Lladós	AJR	17	+46.896	36	
31	53	(France) Valentin Debise	ADV	17	+47.080	37	
32	25	(Italy) Alex Baldolini	I.C.P.	17	+47.216	19	
33	88	(Spain) Yannick Guerra	Moriwaki	17	+47.777	39	
34	95	(Qatar) Mashel Al Naimi	BQR-Moto2	17	+56.595	40	
Ret	91	(Spain) Iván Moreno	Moriwaki	8	Accident	38	
Ret	59	(Italy) Niccolò Canepa	Force GP210	8	Retirement	33	
Ret	75	(Italy) Mattia Pasini	Motobi	6	Retirement	35	
Ret	55	(Spain) Héctor Faubel	Suter	2	Accident	24	
Ret	29	(Italy) Andrea Iannone	Speed Up	0	Accident	28	
Ret	5	(Spain) Joan Olivé	Promoharris	0	Accident	20	
DNS	15	(San Marino) Alex De Angelis	Force GP210		Did not start		
DNS	21	(Russia) Vladimir Leonov	Suter		Did not start		
OFFICIAL MOTO2 REPORT

== 125 cc classification ==
Pos.	No.	Rider	Manufacturer	Laps	Time/Retired	Grid	Points
1	44	(Spain) Pol Espargaró	Derbi	23	41:36.146	2	25
2	40	(Spain) Nicolás Terol	Aprilia	23	+1.886	5	20
3	12	(Spain) Esteve Rabat	Aprilia	23	+15.180	4	16
4	38	(United Kingdom) Bradley Smith	Aprilia	23	+17.110	7	13
5	71	(Japan) Tomoyoshi Koyama	Aprilia	23	+25.069	11	11
6	23	(Spain) Alberto Moncayo	Aprilia	23	+26.860	9	10
7	14	(France) Johann Zarco	Aprilia	23	+27.102	12	9
8	35	(Switzerland) Randy Krummenacher	Aprilia	23	+28.465	10	8
9	5	(France) Alexis Masbou	Aprilia	23	+28.963	17	7
10	53	(Netherlands) Jasper Iwema	Aprilia	23	+58.830	13	6
11	11	(Germany) Sandro Cortese	Derbi	23	+1:03.035	6	5
12	78	(Germany) Marcel Schrötter	Honda	23	+1:04.722	18	4
13	26	(Spain) Adrián Martín	Aprilia	23	+1:04.841	15	3
14	84	(Czech Republic) Jakub Kornfeil	Aprilia	23	+1:05.248	20	2
15	39	(Spain) Luis Salom	Lambretta	23	+1:09.300	25	1
16	57	(Spain) Isaac Viñales	Aprilia	23	+1:09.540	14	
17	87	(Italy) Luca Marconi	Aprilia	23	+1:34.926	21	
18	58	(Spain) Joan Perelló	Honda	23	+1:42.695	24	
19	59	(Spain) Johnny Rosell	Honda	23	+1:51.484	26	
20	63	(Malaysia) Zulfahmi Khairuddin	Aprilia	23	+1:51.525	31	
21	80	(France) Quentin Jacquet	Aprilia	22	+1 Lap	28	
22	72	(Italy) Marco Ravaioli	Lambretta	22	+1 Lap	30	
Ret	94	(Germany) Jonas Folger	Aprilia	22	Accident	19	
Ret	99	(United Kingdom) Danny Webb	Aprilia	21	Accident	8	
Ret	7	(Spain) Efrén Vázquez	Derbi	18	Retirement	3	
Ret	60	(Netherlands) Michael van der Mark	Aprilia	15	Retirement	29	
Ret	69	(France) Louis Rossi	Aprilia	14	Retirement	16	
Ret	51	(Italy) Riccardo Moretti	Aprilia	5	Accident	27	
Ret	50	(Norway) Sturla Fagerhaug	Aprilia	1	Accident	23	
Ret	32	(Italy) Lorenzo Savadori	Aprilia	0	Accident	22	
Ret	93	(Spain) Marc Márquez	Derbi	0	Accident	1	
OFFICIAL 125CC REPORT

== Championship standings after the race (MotoGP) ==
Below are the standings for the top five riders and constructors after round two has concluded.

Riders' Championship standings

Pos.	Rider	Points
1	(Spain) Jorge Lorenzo	45
2	(Italy) Valentino Rossi	41
3	(Spain) Dani Pedrosa	29
4	(Italy) Andrea Dovizioso	26
5	(United States) Nicky Hayden	26

Constructors' Championship standings

Pos.	Constructor	Points
1	(Japan) Yamaha	50
2	(Japan) Honda	36
3	(Italy) Ducati	26
4	(Japan) Suzuki	13

- Note: Only the top five positions are included for both sets of standings.

Previous race: 2010 Qatar Grand Prix	FIM Grand Prix World Championship; 2010 season	Next race: 2010 French Grand Prix
Previous race: 2009 Spanish Grand Prix	Spanish motorcycle Grand Prix	Next race: 2011 Spanish Grand Prix
