= Shoya Tomizawa =

Japanese motorcycle racer

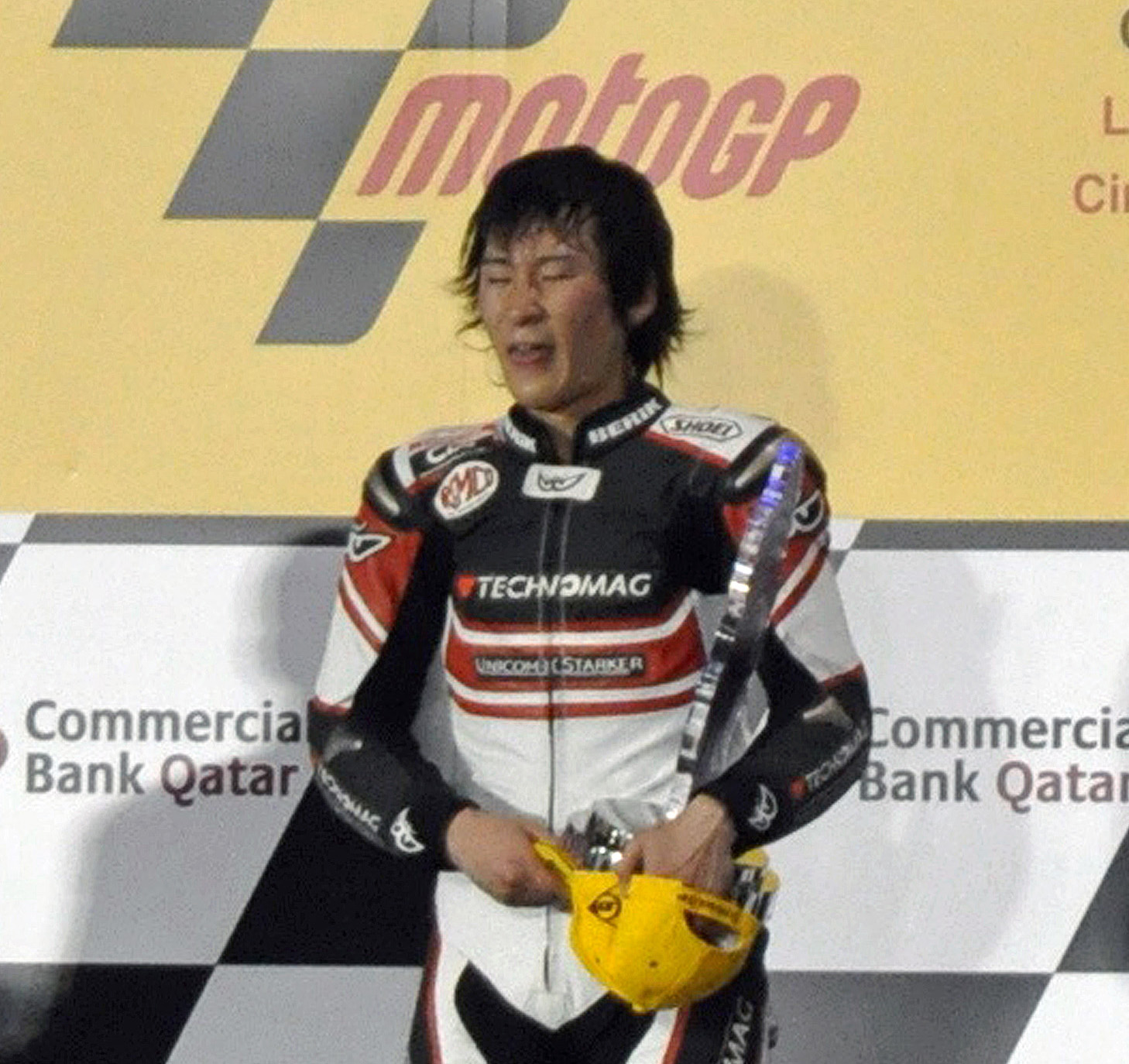
- Tomizawa on the podium at the 2010 Qatar Grand Prix.
- Nationality: Japanese
- Born: 10 December 1990; Asahi, Chiba, Japan
- Died: 5 September 2010 (aged 19); Riccione, Emilia-Romagna, Italy
- Bike number: 48 (retired in honour)
Motorcycle racing career statistics
Moto2 World Championship
Active years	2010
Manufacturers	Suter
Championships	0
2010 championship position	13th (82 pts)
Starts / Wins / Podiums / Poles / F. laps / Points; 10 / 1 / 2 / 2 / 0 / 82
250cc World Championship
Active years	2008–2009
Manufacturers	Honda
Championships	0
2009 championship position	17th (32 pts)
Starts / Wins / Podiums / Poles / F. laps / Points; 16 / 0 / 0 / 0 / 0 / 34
125cc World Championship
Active years	2006–2007
Manufacturers	Honda
Championships	0
2007 championship position	NC (0 pts)
Starts / Wins / Podiums / Poles / F. laps / Points; 2 / 0 / 0 / 0 / 0 / 0

Shoya Tomizawa (富沢 祥也, Tomizawa Shōya) (10 December 1990 – 5 September 2010) was a Japanese motorcycle racer. After a successful career in the All Japan Road Race Championship, he switched to MotoGP and competed in the 250cc class during 2009. In the 2010 season, he rode in the newly created Moto2 class. Tomizawa won the first race of the new class, at Losail in Qatar, winning by nearly five seconds from Alex Debón and Jules Cluzel. Tomizawa died after sustaining cranial, thoracic and abdominal trauma at the San Marino Grand Prix.

== Career ==
Tomizawa was born in Asahi City, Chiba. He started pocket bike racing at the age of three in 1994, winning four national championships, and moving to minibikes around 2001. While attending Sousa High School in Chiba, majoring in English, he started to fully participate in the 125cc class of All Japan Road Race Championship and gained 2nd place for 2006 season. Rookie of the Year was an added bonus to start the fast-paced career.

Tomizawa appeared on both 125cc and 250cc class in the following year, finishing third in the 125, and eighth in the 250 for 2007 season. In 2008, he focused on the 250cc class and finished second with his eyes set for global challenge. Upon his high school graduation in March 2009, Tomizawa was recruited by new CIPMOTO-GP250 Team, ended his full-time, first international racing year in 17th place with best results at tenth twice at Motegi and Valencia respectively riding a Honda RS250R.

Tomizawa moved to the new Moto2 class, which replaced 250cc, for 2010. Riding a Suter motorbike, he won the inaugural Moto2 race at Losail, and followed this up with his first Grand Prix pole position and second place at the following round in Spain. He took a further pole position at Brno later in the season. Showing markedly improved form in comparison with his previous years in MotoGP, he was seventh in the championship after ten races. Commentator Toby Moody described him as a "future star".

== Death ==
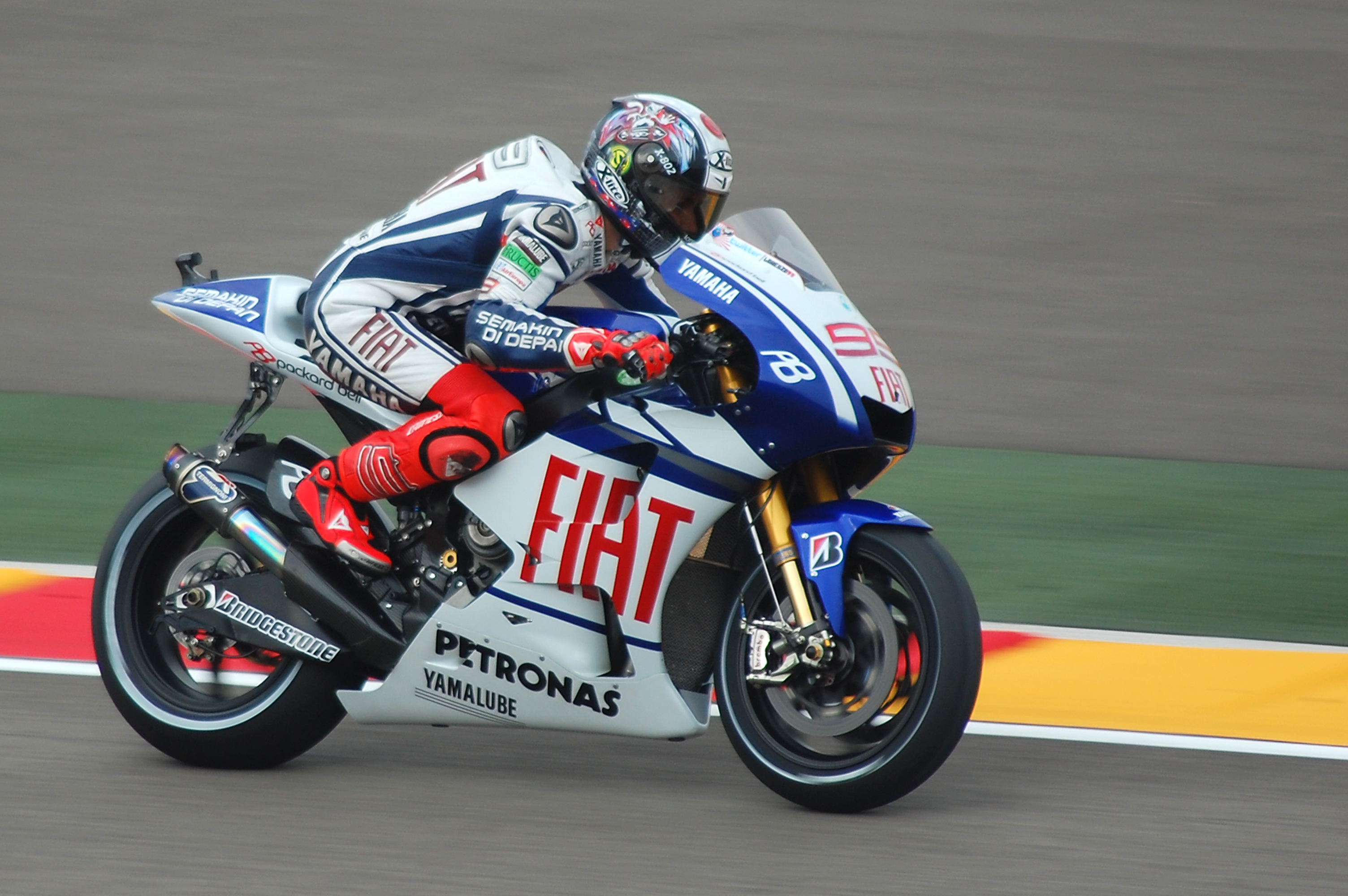
Jorge Lorenzo wore a replica of Tomizawa's helmet at the 2010 Aragon Grand Prix as a mark of respect.

Tomizawa was competing in the eleventh round of the inaugural Moto2 World Championship, the San Marino Grand Prix at the Misano World Circuit on 5 September 2010. On lap 12, holding 4th place, Tomizawa fell at the Curvone, a fast right-hand corner, when he was forced wide and lost grip in his rear tire. He was then struck by the motorbikes of Scott Redding and Alex de Angelis, and suffered cranial, thoracic and abdominal trauma. He was initially taken to the circuit's medical centre, before being transferred to hospital in Riccione. He died from his injuries at 14:20 local time in hospital, aged 19. His death was announced at the end of the MotoGP race. The podium flags were lowered to half-mast, and the podium was celebrated without champagne.

Tomizawa was the first on-track fatality at Grand Prix level since his countryman Daijiro Kato was killed in the senior class at Suzuka in 2003. Tomizawa had placed Kato's racing number 74 on his left shoulder as a tribute to him.

Questions have been raised about the treatment of Tomizawa in the aftermath of the crash. Both he and Redding were hurriedly removed from the scene and bundled onto stretchers; the stretcher carrying Tomizawa appeared to be dropped in the gravel trap before he was removed. MotoGP Doctor Claudio Macchiagodena explained that "Many times it is very important to quickly have support. In this situation if you remove quickly, in my opinion, you have more possibility [to help the patient]". Alex Hofmann originally reported on German TV that neither Tomizawa nor Redding had suffered life-threatening injuries; he had apparently received this information from Dorna themselves.

It was reported that Rimini's state prosecutor, Paolo Giovagnoli, would begin an inquest that might involve criminal proceedings against as yet unnamed individuals.

== Career statistics ==
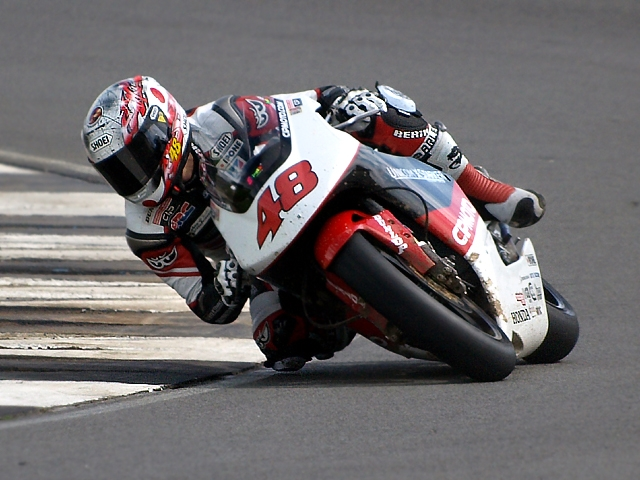
Tomizawa at the 2009 British Grand Prix, held at Donington Park.

=== Grand Prix motorcycle racing ===
==== By season ====
Season	Class	Motorcycle	Team	Number	Race	Win	Podium	Pole	FLap	Pts	Plcd
2006	125cc	Honda	FRS	47	1	0	0	0	0	0	NC
2007	125cc	Honda	Project Muy FRS	58	1	0	0	0	0	0	NC
2008	250cc	Honda	Project U FRS	66	1	0	0	0	0	2	26th
2009	250cc	Honda	CIP Moto - GP250	48	15	0	0	0	0	32	17th
2010	Moto2	Suter	TechnoMag-CIP	48	10	1	2	2	0	82	13th
Total					**28**	**1**	**2**	**2**	**0**	**116**	

==== By class ====
Class	Seasons	1st GP	1st Pod	1st Win	Race	Win	Podiums	Pole	FLap	Pts	WChmp
125cc	2006–2007	2006 Japan			2	0	0	0	0	0	0
250cc	2008–2009	2008 Japan			16	0	0	0	0	34	0
Moto2	2010	2010 Qatar	2010 Qatar	2010 Qatar	10	1	2	2	0	82	0
Total	2006–2010				**28**	**1**	**2**	**2**	**0**	**116**	**0**

==== Races by year ====
(key) (Races in bold indicate pole position, races in italics indicate fastest lap)

Year	Class	Bike	1	2	3	4	5	6	7	8	9	10	11	12	13	14	15	16	17	Pos	Pts
2006	125cc	Honda	SPA	QAT	TUR	CHN	FRA	ITA	CAT	NED	GBR	GER	CZE	MAL	AUS	JPN; Ret	POR	VAL		NC	0
2007	125cc	Honda	QAT	SPA	TUR	CHN	FRA	ITA	CAT	GBR	NED	GER	CZE	RSM	POR	JPN; 22	AUS	MAL	VAL	NC	0
2008	250cc	Honda	QAT	SPA	POR	CHN	FRA	ITA	CAT	GBR	NED	GER	CZE	RSM	INP	JPN; 14	AUS	MAL	VAL	26th	2
2009	250cc	Honda	QAT; 12	JPN; 10	SPA; 12	FRA; Ret	ITA; Ret	CAT; Ret	NED; Ret	GER; 13	GBR; 15	CZE; 13	INP; DNS	RSM; 12	POR; Ret	AUS; 15	MAL; 16	VAL; 10		17th	32
2010	Moto2	Suter	QAT; 1	**SPA**; 2	FRA; Ret	ITA; 6	GBR; 6	NED; 5	CAT; Ret	GER; 18	**CZE**; 10	INP; DNS	RSM; Ret	ARA	JPN	MAL	AUS	POR	VAL	13th	82
