= Yuki Oogane =

Japanese motorcycle racer

- Nationality: Japanese
- Born: 29 September 1992 (age 34); Ibaraki, Japan
Motorcycle racing career statistics
125cc World Championship
Active years	2009
Manufacturers	Honda
Starts / Wins / Podiums / Poles / F. laps / Points; 1 / 0 / 0 / 0 / 0 / 0

Yuki Oogane (大金 佑輝, Ōgane Yūki; born 29 September 1992) is a Japanese motorcycle racer. He has competed in the GP125 and J-GP3 classes of the All Japan Road Race Championship.

== Career statistics ==
=== Grand Prix motorcycle racing ===
==== By season ====
Season	Class	Motorcycle	Team	Number	Race	Win	Podium	Pole	FLap	Pts	Plcd
2009	125cc	Honda	Endurance & Okegawajuku	57	1	0	0	0	0	0	NC
Total					1	0	0	0	0	0	

==== Races by year ====
(key)

Year	Class	Bike	1	2	3	4	5	6	7	8	9	10	11	12	13	14	15	16	Pos.	Pts
2009	125cc	Honda	QAT	JPN; 29	SPA	FRA	ITA	CAT	NED	GER	GBR	CZE	IND	RSM	POR	AUS	MAL	VAL	NC	0
