= 2010 Czech Republic motorcycle Grand Prix =

10th round of the 2010 FIM Road Racing World Championship season

2010 Czech Republic Grand Prix
Race details
- Race 10 of 18 races in the 2010 Grand Prix motorcycle racing season
- Date: 15 August 2010
- Official name: Cardion AB Grand Prix České republiky
- Location: Brno Circuit
- Course: Permanent racing facility; 5.403 km (3.357 mi)

MotoGP
Pole position
- Rider: (Spain) Dani Pedrosa
- Time: 1:56.508
Fastest lap
- Rider: (Spain) Jorge Lorenzo
- Time: 1:57.524
Podium
- First: (Spain) Jorge Lorenzo
- Second: (Spain) Dani Pedrosa
- Third: (Australia) Casey Stoner

Moto2
Pole position
- Rider: (Japan) Shoya Tomizawa
- Time: 2:03.452
Fastest lap
- Rider: (Spain) Toni Elías
- Time: 2:04.315
Podium
- First: (Spain) Toni Elías
- Second: (Japan) Yuki Takahashi
- Third: (Italy) Andrea Iannone

125cc
Pole position
- Rider: (United Kingdom) Bradley Smith
- Time: 2:07.146
Fastest lap
- Rider: (France) Johann Zarco
- Time: 2:12.642
Podium
- First: (Spain) Nicolás Terol
- Second: (Spain) Pol Espargaró
- Third: (Spain) Esteve Rabat

The 2010 Czech Republic motorcycle Grand Prix was the tenth round of the 2010 Grand Prix motorcycle racing season. It took place on the weekend of 13–15 August 2010 at the Brno Circuit located in Brno.

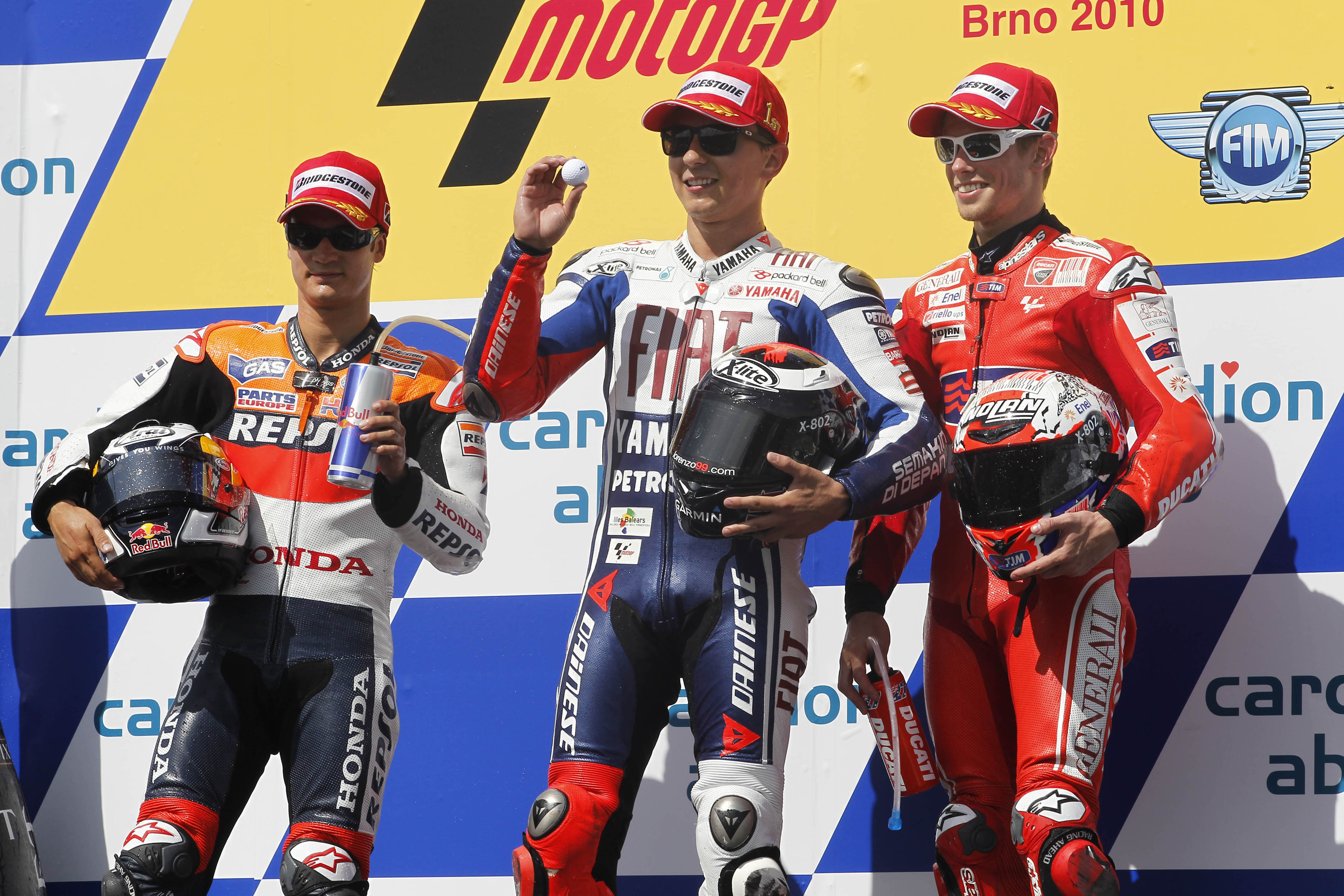
Dani Pedrosa, Jorge Lorenzo and Casey Stoner, celebrating on the podium after finishing second, first and third at the MotoGP race.

== MotoGP classification ==
| Pos. | No. | Rider | Team | Manufacturer | Laps | Time/Retired | Grid | Points |
|---|---|---|---|---|---|---|---|---|
| 1 | 99 | (Spain) Jorge Lorenzo | Fiat Yamaha Team | Yamaha | 22 | 43:22.638 | 3 | 25 |
| 2 | 26 | (Spain) Dani Pedrosa | Repsol Honda Team | Honda | 22 | +5.494 | 1 | 20 |
| 3 | 27 | (Australia) Casey Stoner | Ducati Team | Ducati | 22 | +11.426 | 4 | 16 |
| 4 | 11 | (United States) Ben Spies | Monster Yamaha Tech 3 | Yamaha | 22 | +13.723 | 2 | 13 |
| 5 | 46 | (Italy) Valentino Rossi | Fiat Yamaha Team | Yamaha | 22 | +17.930 | 5 | 11 |
| 6 | 69 | (United States) Nicky Hayden | Ducati Team | Ducati | 22 | +26.815 | 8 | 10 |
| 7 | 5 | (United States) Colin Edwards | Monster Yamaha Tech 3 | Yamaha | 22 | +33.396 | 7 | 9 |
| 8 | 33 | (Italy) Marco Melandri | San Carlo Honda Gresini | Honda | 22 | +39.406 | 14 | 8 |
| 9 | 40 | (Spain) Héctor Barberá | Páginas Amarillas Aspar | Ducati | 22 | +39.639 | 9 | 7 |
| 10 | 14 | (France) Randy de Puniet | LCR Honda MotoGP | Honda | 22 | +40.893 | 11 | 6 |
| 11 | 58 | (Italy) Marco Simoncelli | San Carlo Honda Gresini | Honda | 22 | +42.032 | 12 | 5 |
| 12 | 41 | (Spain) Aleix Espargaró | Pramac Racing Team | Ducati | 22 | +47.091 | 16 | 4 |
| 13 | 15 | (San Marino) Alex de Angelis | Interwetten Honda MotoGP | Honda | 22 | +51.368 | 15 | 3 |
| Ret | 19 | (Spain) Álvaro Bautista | Rizla Suzuki MotoGP | Suzuki | 21 | Accident | 17 | |
| Ret | 36 | (Finland) Mika Kallio | Pramac Racing Team | Ducati | 7 | Accident | 13 | |
| Ret | 4 | (Italy) Andrea Dovizioso | Repsol Honda Team | Honda | 6 | Retirement | 6 | |
| Ret | 65 | (Italy) Loris Capirossi | Rizla Suzuki MotoGP | Suzuki | 1 | Accident | 10 | |

== Moto2 classification ==
| Pos. | No. | Rider | Manufacturer | Laps | Time/Retired | Grid | Points |
|---|---|---|---|---|---|---|---|
| 1 | 24 | (Spain) Toni Elías | Moriwaki | 20 | 41:51.715 | 3 | 25 |
| 2 | 72 | (Japan) Yuki Takahashi | Tech 3 | 20 | +2.312 | 5 | 20 |
| 3 | 29 | (Italy) Andrea Iannone | Speed Up | 20 | +2.959 | 2 | 16 |
| 4 | 16 | (France) Jules Cluzel | Suter | 20 | +6.905 | 11 | 13 |
| 5 | 60 | (Spain) Julián Simón | Suter | 20 | +6.974 | 9 | 11 |
| 6 | 2 | (Hungary) Gábor Talmácsi | Speed Up | 20 | +7.024 | 16 | 10 |
| 7 | 6 | (Spain) Alex Debón | FTR | 20 | +7.808 | 15 | 9 |
| 8 | 3 | (Italy) Simone Corsi | Motobi | 20 | +11.691 | 7 | 8 |
| 9 | 65 | (Germany) Stefan Bradl | Suter | 20 | +15.958 | 20 | 7 |
| 10 | 48 | (Japan) Shoya Tomizawa | Suter | 20 | +15.974 | 1 | 6 |
| 11 | 12 | (Switzerland) Thomas Lüthi | Moriwaki | 20 | +16.486 | 13 | 5 |
| 12 | 55 | (Spain) Héctor Faubel | Suter | 20 | +16.490 | 19 | 4 |
| 13 | 10 | (Spain) Fonsi Nieto | Moriwaki | 20 | +19.426 | 12 | 3 |
| 14 | 40 | (Spain) Sergio Gadea | Pons Kalex | 20 | +20.130 | 22 | 2 |
| 15 | 35 | (Italy) Raffaele De Rosa | Tech 3 | 20 | +20.227 | 17 | 1 |
| 16 | 77 | (Switzerland) Dominique Aegerter | Suter | 20 | +20.233 | 6 | |
| 17 | 25 | (Italy) Alex Baldolini | I.C.P. | 20 | +25.738 | 14 | |
| 18 | 8 | (Australia) Anthony West | MZ-RE Honda | 20 | +27.526 | 32 | |
| 19 | 19 | (Belgium) Xavier Siméon | Moriwaki | 20 | +27.711 | 34 | |
| 20 | 63 | (France) Mike Di Meglio | Suter | 20 | +28.895 | 18 | |
| 21 | 14 | (Thailand) Ratthapark Wilairot | Bimota | 20 | +36.263 | 24 | |
| 22 | 45 | (United Kingdom) Scott Redding | Suter | 20 | +44.281 | 10 | |
| 23 | 68 | (Colombia) Yonny Hernández | BQR-Moto2 | 20 | +46.446 | 33 | |
| 24 | 4 | (Spain) Ricky Cardús | Bimota | 20 | +47.620 | 35 | |
| 25 | 80 | (Spain) Axel Pons | Pons Kalex | 20 | +47.798 | 21 | |
| 26 | 71 | (Italy) Claudio Corti | Suter | 20 | +47.966 | 23 | |
| 27 | 61 | (Ukraine) Vladimir Ivanov | Moriwaki | 20 | +48.499 | 26 | |
| 28 | 59 | (Italy) Niccolò Canepa | Suter | 20 | +51.993 | 30 | |
| 29 | 39 | (Venezuela) Robertino Pietri | Suter | 20 | +52.243 | 37 | |
| 30 | 95 | (Qatar) Mashel Al Naimi | BQR-Moto2 | 20 | +53.151 | 36 | |
| 31 | 5 | (Spain) Joan Olivé | Promoharris | 20 | +53.478 | 38 | |
| 32 | 53 | (France) Valentin Debise | ADV | 20 | +1:00.080 | 28 | |
| 33 | 88 | (Spain) Yannick Guerra | Moriwaki | 20 | +1:08.242 | 39 | |
| Ret | 44 | (Italy) Roberto Rolfo | Suter | 14 | Retirement | 4 | |
| Ret | 11 | (Japan) Yusuke Teshima | Motobi | 12 | Accident | 29 | |
| Ret | 52 | (Czech Republic) Lukáš Pešek | Moriwaki | 9 | Retirement | 25 | |
| Ret | 81 | (Czech Republic) Patrik Vostárek | Suter | 2 | Accident | 27 | |
| Ret | 9 | (United States) Kenny Noyes | Promoharris | 1 | Accident | 31 | |
| Ret | 41 | (Germany) Arne Tode | Suter | 0 | Accident | 8 | |
| DNS | 17 | (Czech Republic) Karel Abraham | FTR | | Did not start | | |
OFFICIAL MOTO2 REPORT

== 125 cc classification ==
| Pos. | No. | Rider | Manufacturer | Laps | Time/Retired | Grid | Points |
|---|---|---|---|---|---|---|---|
| 1 | 40 | (Spain) Nicolás Terol | Aprilia | 19 | 43:49.303 | 2 | 25 |
| 2 | 44 | (Spain) Pol Espargaró | Derbi | 19 | +20.351 | 3 | 20 |
| 3 | 12 | (Spain) Esteve Rabat | Aprilia | 19 | +20.555 | 12 | 16 |
| 4 | 94 | (Germany) Jonas Folger | Aprilia | 19 | +29.529 | 13 | 13 |
| 5 | 84 | (Czech Republic) Jakub Kornfeil | Aprilia | 19 | +29.914 | 14 | 11 |
| 6 | 38 | (United Kingdom) Bradley Smith | Aprilia | 19 | +29.986 | 1 | 10 |
| 7 | 93 | (Spain) Marc Márquez | Derbi | 19 | +31.405 | 4 | 9 |
| 8 | 53 | (Netherlands) Jasper Iwema | Aprilia | 19 | +32.973 | 17 | 8 |
| 9 | 71 | (Japan) Tomoyoshi Koyama | Aprilia | 19 | +41.842 | 8 | 7 |
| 10 | 39 | (Spain) Luis Salom | Aprilia | 19 | +46.128 | 10 | 6 |
| 11 | 26 | (Spain) Adrián Martín | Aprilia | 19 | +46.759 | 22 | 5 |
| 12 | 23 | (Spain) Alberto Moncayo | Aprilia | 19 | +47.630 | 15 | 4 |
| 13 | 78 | (Germany) Marcel Schrötter | Honda | 19 | +50.657 | 18 | 3 |
| 14 | 69 | (France) Louis Rossi | Aprilia | 19 | +50.728 | 21 | 2 |
| 15 | 63 | (Malaysia) Zulfahmi Khairuddin | Aprilia | 19 | +55.490 | 23 | 1 |
| 16 | 11 | (Germany) Sandro Cortese | Derbi | 19 | +1:00.902 | 5 | |
| 17 | 35 | (Switzerland) Randy Krummenacher | Aprilia | 19 | +1:02.374 | 7 | |
| 18 | 95 | (Italy) Alessandro Tonucci | Aprilia | 19 | +1:30.736 | 27 | |
| 19 | 14 | (France) Johann Zarco | Aprilia | 19 | +1:50.616 | 9 | |
| 20 | 50 | (Norway) Sturla Fagerhaug | Aprilia | 19 | +1:53.811 | 20 | |
| 21 | 72 | (Italy) Marco Ravaioli | Lambretta | 19 | +1:54.419 | 28 | |
| 22 | 55 | (Spain) Isaac Viñales | Lambretta | 19 | +1:54.710 | 25 | |
| 23 | 87 | (Italy) Luca Marconi | Aprilia | 19 | +2:03.252 | 29 | |
| Ret | 7 | (Spain) Efrén Vázquez | Derbi | 17 | Accident | 6 | |
| Ret | 15 | (Italy) Simone Grotzkyj | Aprilia | 13 | Retirement | 19 | |
| Ret | 48 | (Czech Republic) Ladislav Chmelík | Honda | 11 | Retirement | 30 | |
| Ret | 32 | (Italy) Lorenzo Savadori | Aprilia | 10 | Retirement | 24 | |
| Ret | 92 | (Italy) Luigi Morciano | Aprilia | 8 | Retirement | 26 | |
| Ret | 5 | (France) Alexis Masbou | Aprilia | 1 | Accident | 16 | |
| Ret | 99 | (United Kingdom) Danny Webb | Aprilia | 0 | Accident | 11 | |
| DNQ | 49 | (Czech Republic) Andrea Toušková | Honda | | Did not qualify | | |
OFFICIAL 125CC REPORT

== Championship standings after the race (MotoGP) ==
Below are the standings for the top five riders and constructors after round ten has concluded.

Riders' Championship standings

| Pos. | Rider | Points |
|---|---|---|
| 1 | (Spain) Jorge Lorenzo | 235 |
| 2 | (Spain) Dani Pedrosa | 158 |
| 3 | (Australia) Casey Stoner | 119 |
| 4 | (Italy) Andrea Dovizioso | 115 |
| 5 | (Italy) Valentino Rossi | 101 |

Constructors' Championship standings

| Pos. | Constructor | Points |
|---|---|---|
| 1 | (Japan) Yamaha | 240 |
| 2 | (Japan) Honda | 195 |
| 3 | (Italy) Ducati | 149 |
| 4 | (Japan) Suzuki | 48 |

- Note: Only the top five positions are included for both sets of standings.

| Previous race: 2010 United States Grand Prix | FIM Grand Prix World Championship; 2010 season | Next race: 2010 Indianapolis Grand Prix |
| Previous race: 2009 Czech Republic Grand Prix | Czech Republic motorcycle Grand Prix | Next race: 2011 Czech Republic Grand Prix |
