= 2010 Indianapolis motorcycle Grand Prix =

11th round of the 2010 FIM Road Racing World Championship season

2010 Indianapolis Grand Prix
Race details
- Race 11 of 18 races in the 2010 Grand Prix motorcycle racing season
- Date: August 29, 2010
- Official name: Red Bull Indianapolis Grand Prix
- Location: Indianapolis Motor Speedway
- Course: Permanent racing facility; 4.216 km (2.620 mi)

MotoGP
Pole position
- Rider: (United States) Ben Spies
- Time: 1:40.105
Fastest lap
- Rider: (Spain) Dani Pedrosa
- Time: 1:40.896
Podium
- First: (Spain) Dani Pedrosa
- Second: (United States) Ben Spies
- Third: (Spain) Jorge Lorenzo

Moto2
Pole position
- Rider: (Spain) Julián Simón
- Time: 1:46.139
Fastest lap
- Rider: (Spain) Julián Simón
- Time: 1:46.580
Podium
- First: (Spain) Toni Elías
- Second: (Spain) Julián Simón
- Third: (United Kingdom) Scott Redding

125cc
Pole position
- Rider: (Spain) Marc Márquez
- Time: 1:48.124
Fastest lap
- Rider: (Spain) Marc Márquez
- Time: 1:48.672
Podium
- First: (Spain) Nicolás Terol
- Second: (Germany) Sandro Cortese
- Third: (Spain) Pol Espargaró

The 2010 Indianapolis Grand Prix was the eleventh round of the 2010 Grand Prix motorcycle racing season. It took place on the weekend of August 27–29, 2010 at the Indianapolis Motor Speedway.

During a support event for MotoGP, the second of two United States Grand Prix Racer Union 250cc (age 12–18) races during the race meet on August 29, 13-year-old Peter Lenz was killed during the warmup lap before the start. It was the first competitor fatality at the Speedway during a race since 1973.

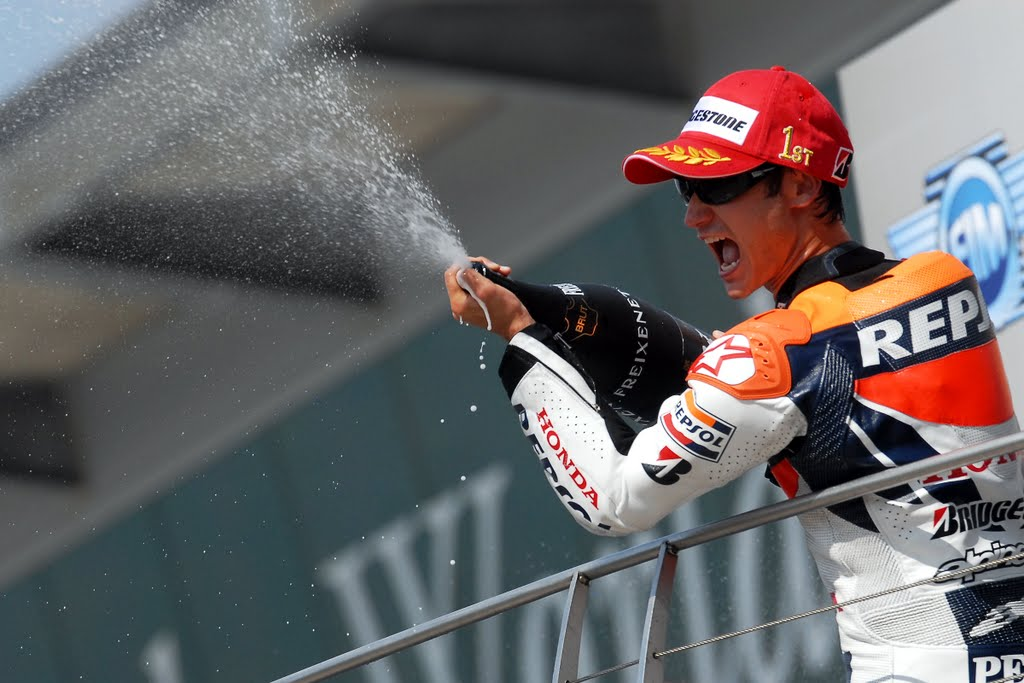
Dani Pedrosa, spraying the champagne on the podium after winning the MotoGP race.

== MotoGP classification ==
Pos.	No.	Rider	Team	Manufacturer	Laps	Time/Retired	Grid	Points
1	26	(Spain) Dani Pedrosa	Repsol Honda Team	Honda	28	47:31.615	5	25
2	11	(United States) Ben Spies	Monster Yamaha Tech 3	Yamaha	28	+3.575	1	20
3	99	(Spain) Jorge Lorenzo	Fiat Yamaha Team	Yamaha	28	+6.812	2	16
4	46	(Italy) Valentino Rossi	Fiat Yamaha Team	Yamaha	28	+12.633	7	13
5	4	(Italy) Andrea Dovizioso	Repsol Honda Team	Honda	28	+21.885	4	11
6	69	(United States) Nicky Hayden	Ducati Team	Ducati	28	+35.138	3	10
7	58	(Italy) Marco Simoncelli	San Carlo Honda Gresini	Honda	28	+36.740	8	9
8	19	(Spain) Álvaro Bautista	Rizla Suzuki MotoGP	Suzuki	28	+36.825	11	8
9	41	(Spain) Aleix Espargaró	Pramac Racing Team	Ducati	28	+44.905	14	7
10	40	(Spain) Héctor Barberá	Páginas Amarillas Aspar	Ducati	28	+51.368	16	6
11	65	(Italy) Loris Capirossi	Rizla Suzuki MotoGP	Suzuki	28	+55.386	10	5
12	7	(Japan) Hiroshi Aoyama	Interwetten Honda MotoGP	Honda	28	+57.903	13	4
13	14	(France) Randy de Puniet	LCR Honda MotoGP	Honda	28	+1:04.139	17	3
Ret	36	(Finland) Mika Kallio	Pramac Racing Team	Ducati	18	Accident	15	
Ret	5	(United States) Colin Edwards	Monster Yamaha Tech 3	Yamaha	16	Retirement	9	
Ret	27	(Australia) Casey Stoner	Ducati Team	Ducati	7	Accident	6	
Ret	33	(Italy) Marco Melandri	San Carlo Honda Gresini	Honda	2	Accident	12	

== Moto2 classification ==
An eight-motorcycle crash in the Snake Pit at the start (#34 R. Hayden, #29 Iannone, #2 Talmácsi, #52 Pešek, #61 Ivanov, #3 Corsi, #48 Tomizawa, #56 Ranseder) led to a red flag and two retirements (Tomizawa and Ranseder) immediately. It was later restarted, with the distance shortened to 17 laps.

Pos.	No.	Rider	Manufacturer	Laps	Time/Retired	Grid	Points
1	24	(Spain) Toni Elías	Moriwaki	17	30:27.480	6	25
2	60	(Spain) Julián Simón	Suter	17	+0.405	1	20
3	45	(United Kingdom) Scott Redding	Suter	17	+4.227	3	16
4	29	(Italy) Andrea Iannone	Speed Up	17	+5.978	25	13
5	3	(Italy) Simone Corsi	Motobi	17	+7.058	4	11
6	40	(Spain) Sergio Gadea	Pons Kalex	17	+9.432	8	10
7	12	(Switzerland) Thomas Lüthi	Moriwaki	17	+9.815	16	9
8	2	(Hungary) Gábor Talmácsi	Speed Up	17	+10.141	15	8
9	42	(United States) Jason DiSalvo	FTR	17	+17.564	26	7
10	8	(Australia) Anthony West	MZ-RE Honda	17	+17.592	5	6
11	77	(Switzerland) Dominique Aegerter	Suter	17	+17.618	20	5
12	63	(France) Mike Di Meglio	Suter	17	+20.527	21	4
13	71	(Italy) Claudio Corti	Suter	17	+26.008	13	3
14	80	(Spain) Axel Pons	Pons Kalex	17	+28.353	27	2
15	68	(Colombia) Yonny Hernández	BQR-Moto2	17	+30.480	22	1
16	25	(Italy) Alex Baldolini	I.C.P.	17	+30.538	19	
17	34	(United States) Roger Lee Hayden	Moriwaki	17	+31.860	28	
18	53	(France) Valentin Debise	ADV	17	+32.255	30	
19	9	(United States) Kenny Noyes	Promoharris	17	+32.500	29	
20	52	(Czech Republic) Lukáš Pešek	Moriwaki	17	+32.529	14	
21	39	(Venezuela) Robertino Pietri	Suter	17	+44.569	32	
22	5	(Spain) Joan Olivé	Promoharris	17	+44.956	35	
23	41	(Germany) Arne Tode	Suter	17	+52.993	31	
24	88	(Spain) Yannick Guerra	Moriwaki	17	+57.481	38	
25	44	(Italy) Roberto Rolfo	Suter	17	+1:16.404	18	
26	72	(Japan) Yuki Takahashi	Tech 3	14	+3 laps	12	
Ret	95	(Qatar) Mashel Al Naimi	BQR-Moto2	12	Retirement	37	
Ret	16	(France) Jules Cluzel	Suter	11	Accident	17	
Ret	14	(Thailand) Ratthapark Wilairot	Bimota	8	Retirement	7	
Ret	35	(Italy) Raffaele De Rosa	Tech 3	6	Retirement	10	
Ret	65	(Germany) Stefan Bradl	Suter	5	Retirement	9	
Ret	4	(Spain) Ricard Cardús	Bimota	2	Accident	34	
Ret	11	(Japan) Yusuke Teshima	Motobi	2	Accident	36	
Ret	55	(Spain) Héctor Faubel	Suter	1	Accident	2	
Ret	6	(Spain) Alex Debón	FTR	1	Accident	33	
Ret	61	(Ukraine) Vladimir Ivanov	Moriwaki	1	Accident	24	
DNS	48	(Japan) Shoya Tomizawa	Suter	0	Accident in first start	23	
DNS	56	(Austria) Michael Ranseder	Suter	0	Accident in first start	11	
DNS	10	(Spain) Fonsi Nieto	Moriwaki		Injured		
DNS	17	(Czech Republic) Karel Abraham	FTR		Did not start		
OFFICIAL MOTO2 REPORT

== 125 cc classification ==
Marc Márquez was given a 20-second penalty after the race for cutting the track.

Pos.	No.	Rider	Manufacturer	Laps	Time/Retired	Grid	Points
1	40	(Spain) Nicolás Terol	Aprilia	23	42:19.223	2	25
2	11	(Germany) Sandro Cortese	Derbi	23	+4.995	4	20
3	44	(Spain) Pol Espargaró	Derbi	23	+10.856	5	16
4	7	(Spain) Efrén Vázquez	Derbi	23	+15.402	6	13
5	12	(Spain) Esteve Rabat	Aprilia	23	+19.912	10	11
6	99	(United Kingdom) Danny Webb	Aprilia	23	+20.093	11	10
7	35	(Switzerland) Randy Krummenacher	Aprilia	23	+20.702	13	9
8	23	(Spain) Alberto Moncayo	Aprilia	23	+26.797	15	8
9	94	(Germany) Jonas Folger	Aprilia	23	+27.666	12	7
10	93	(Spain) Marc Márquez	Derbi	23	+39.840	1	6
11	53	(Netherlands) Jasper Iwema	Aprilia	23	+46.153	18	5
12	39	(Spain) Luis Salom	Aprilia	23	+52.556	7	4
13	14	(France) Johann Zarco	Aprilia	23	+54.354	8	3
14	84	(Czech Republic) Jakub Kornfeil	Aprilia	23	+54.402	17	2
15	32	(Italy) Lorenzo Savadori	Aprilia	23	+1:07.208	20	1
16	72	(Italy) Marco Ravaioli	Lambretta	23	+1:24.117	24	
17	15	(Italy) Simone Grotzkyj	Aprilia	23	+1:25.890	14	
18	87	(Italy) Luca Marconi	Aprilia	23	+1:53.618	25	
Ret	71	(Japan) Tomoyoshi Koyama	Aprilia	14	Retirement	9	
Ret	38	(United Kingdom) Bradley Smith	Aprilia	12	Accident	3	
Ret	26	(Spain) Adrián Martín	Aprilia	12	Retirement	19	
Ret	63	(Malaysia) Zulfahmi Khairuddin	Aprilia	11	Retirement	22	
Ret	78	(Germany) Marcel Schrötter	Honda	8	Accident	16	
Ret	55	(Spain) Isaac Viñales	Lambretta	3	Accident	21	
Ret	69	(France) Louis Rossi	Aprilia	1	Retirement	23	
DNS	5	(France) Alexis Masbou	Aprilia		Did not start		
DNS	90	(United States) Kristian Lee Turner	Aprilia		Did not start		
OFFICIAL 125CC REPORT

== Championship standings after the race (MotoGP) ==
Below are the standings for the top five riders and constructors after round eleven has concluded.

Riders' Championship standings

Pos.	Rider	Points
1	(Spain) Jorge Lorenzo	251
2	(Spain) Dani Pedrosa	183
3	(Italy) Andrea Dovizioso	126
4	(Australia) Casey Stoner	119
5	(Italy) Valentino Rossi	114

Constructors' Championship standings

Pos.	Constructor	Points
1	(Japan) Yamaha	260
2	(Japan) Honda	220
3	(Italy) Ducati	159
4	(Japan) Suzuki	56

- Note: Only the top five positions are included for both sets of standings.

Previous race: 2010 Czech Republic Grand Prix	FIM Grand Prix World Championship; 2010 season	Next race: 2010 San Marino Grand Prix
Previous race: 2009 Indianapolis Grand Prix	Indianapolis motorcycle Grand Prix	Next race: 2011 Indianapolis Grand Prix
