= Axel Pons =

Spanish motorcycle racer

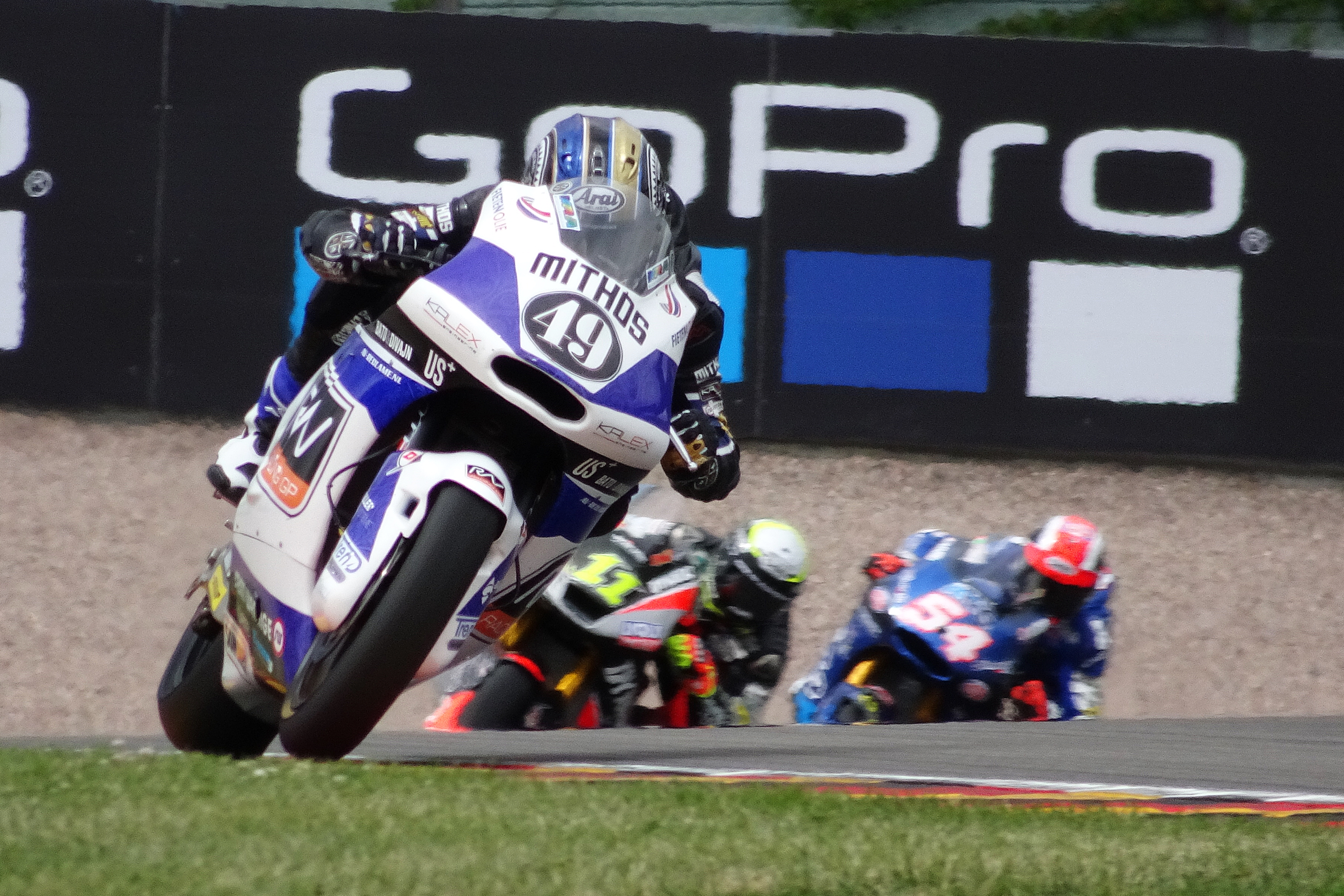
- Pons in 2017
- Nationality: Spanish
- Born: 9 April 1991 (age 35); Barcelona, Spain
- Bike number: 49
Motorcycle racing career statistics
Moto2 World Championship
| Active years | 2010–2017 |
| Manufacturers | Pons Kalex, Kalex |
| Championships | 0 |
| 2017 championship position | 19th (27 pts) |
Starts / Wins / Podiums / Poles / F. laps / Points; 126 / 0 / 0 / 0 / 0 / 176
250cc World Championship
| Active years | 2009 |
| Manufacturers | Aprilia |
| Championships | 0 |
| 2009 championship position | 26th (3 pts) |
Starts / Wins / Podiums / Poles / F. laps / Points; 16 / 0 / 0 / 0 / 0 / 3
125cc World Championship
| Active years | 2008 |
| Manufacturers | Honda |
| Championships | 0 |
| 2008 championship position | NC (0 pt) |
Starts / Wins / Podiums / Poles / F. laps / Points; 3 / 0 / 0 / 0 / 0 / 0

Axel Pons Ramón (born 9 April 1991) is a former Grand Prix motorcycle racer and model from Spain. He graduated from La Salle University in Barcelona with a degree in Business Engineering. His father Sito Pons is a former double World Champion in the 250cc class. He is a former competitor of the Spanish 125GP Championship, prior to competing at Grand Prix level. Aside from racing, he was working as a model and managed by the Spanish agency Sight in 2017.

== Barefoot walk ==
In 2023, Pons started walking barefoot from Spain to Pakistan. As of December 2024, he has reached Pakistan.

== Career statistics ==
=== Grand Prix motorcycle racing ===
==== By season ====
| Season | Class | Motorcycle | Team | Number | Race | Win | Podium | Pole | FLap | Pts | Plcd |
|---|---|---|---|---|---|---|---|---|---|---|---|
| 2008 | 125cc | Aprilia | Jack & Jones WRB | 14 | 3 | 0 | 0 | 0 | 0 | 0 | NC |
| 2009 | 250cc | Aprilia | Pepe World Team | 7 | 16 | 0 | 0 | 0 | 0 | 3 | 26th |
| 2010 | Moto2 | Pons Kalex | Tenerife 40 Pons | 80 | 14 | 0 | 0 | 0 | 0 | 7 | 33rd |
| 2011 | Moto2 | Pons Kalex | Pons HP 40 | 80 | 12 | 0 | 0 | 0 | 0 | 1 | 32nd |
| 2012 | Moto2 | Kalex | Pons 40 HP Tuenti | 49 | 17 | 0 | 0 | 0 | 0 | 11 | 24th |
| 2013 | Moto2 | Kalex | Tuenti HP 40 | 49 | 15 | 0 | 0 | 0 | 0 | 6 | 25th |
| 2014 | Moto2 | Kalex | AGR Team | 49 | 17 | 0 | 0 | 0 | 0 | 28 | 23rd |
| 2015 | Moto2 | Kalex | AGR Team | 49 | 16 | 0 | 0 | 0 | 0 | 41 | 19th |
| 2016 | Moto2 | Kalex | AGR Team | 49 | 18 | 0 | 0 | 0 | 0 | 55 | 16th |
| 2017 | Moto2 | Kalex | RW Racing GP | 49 | 16 | 0 | 0 | 0 | 0 | 27 | 19th |
| Total | | | | | **144** | **0** | **0** | **0** | **0** | **179** | |

==== By class ====
| Class | Seasons | 1st GP | 1st Pod | 1st Win | Race | Win | Podiums | Pole | FLap | Pts | WChmp |
|---|---|---|---|---|---|---|---|---|---|---|---|
| 125cc | 2008 | 2008 Spain | | | 3 | 0 | 0 | 0 | 0 | 0 | 0 |
| 250cc | 2009 | 2009 Qatar | | | 16 | 0 | 0 | 0 | 0 | 3 | 0 |
| Moto2 | 2010–2017 | 2010 Qatar | | | 126 | 0 | 0 | 0 | 0 | 176 | 0 |
| Total | 2008–2017 | | | | **144** | **0** | **0** | **0** | **0** | **179** | **0** |

==== Races by year ====
(key) (Races in bold indicate pole position, races in italics indicate fastest lap of the race)

| Year | Class | Bike | 1 | 2 | 3 | 4 | 5 | 6 | 7 | 8 | 9 | 10 | 11 | 12 | 13 | 14 | 15 | 16 | 17 | 18 | Pos | Pts |
|---|---|---|---|---|---|---|---|---|---|---|---|---|---|---|---|---|---|---|---|---|---|---|
| 2008 | 125cc | Aprilia | QAT | SPA; Ret | POR; 26 | CHN | FRA | ITA | CAT; Ret | GBR | NED | GER | CZE | RSM | INP | JPN | AUS | MAL | VAL | | NC | 0 |
| 2009 | 250cc | Aprilia | QAT; Ret | JPN; Ret | SPA; Ret | FRA; Ret | ITA; 17 | CAT; 16 | NED; Ret | GER; 16 | GBR; 20 | CZE; 16 | INP; 14 | RSM; 16 | POR; 15 | AUS; Ret | MAL; Ret | VAL; Ret | | | 26th | 3 |
| 2010 | Moto2 | Pons Kalex | QAT; Ret | SPA; 19 | FRA; Ret | ITA; Ret | GBR; 23 | NED; DNS | CAT | GER | CZE; 25 | INP; 14 | RSM; 18 | ARA; Ret | JPN; 19 | MAL; 17 | AUS; 14 | POR; 13 | VAL; Ret | | 33rd | 7 |
| 2011 | Moto2 | Pons Kalex | QAT; 16 | SPA; Ret | POR; 15 | FRA; Ret | CAT; Ret | GBR; Ret | NED; Ret | ITA; DNS | GER; 22 | CZE; 24 | INP | RSM | ARA | JPN; Ret | AUS; 19 | MAL; NC | VAL; DNS | | 32nd | 1 |
| 2012 | Moto2 | Kalex | QAT; 22 | SPA; 18 | POR; Ret | FRA; 16 | CAT; 22 | GBR; Ret | NED; Ret | GER; Ret | ITA; Ret | INP; 21 | CZE; 15 | RSM; 17 | ARA; 16 | JPN; 9 | MAL; 13 | AUS; Ret | VAL; 20 | | 24th | 11 |
| 2013 | Moto2 | Kalex | QAT; Ret | AME; 16 | SPA; Ret | FRA; Ret | ITA; Ret | CAT; 14 | NED; 21 | GER; 15 | INP; DNS | CZE; 20 | GBR; 21 | RSM; 17 | ARA; 16 | MAL; DNS | AUS; 24 | JPN; 13 | VAL; 20 | | 25th | 6 |
| 2014 | Moto2 | Kalex | QAT; Ret | AME; 19 | ARG; 26 | SPA; 16 | FRA; Ret | ITA; 15 | CAT; 8 | NED; Ret | GER; 15 | INP; 16 | CZE; 11 | GBR; 10 | RSM; 9 | ARA; Ret | JPN; Ret | AUS; DNS | MAL; Ret | VAL; Ret | 23rd | 28 |
| 2015 | Moto2 | Kalex | QAT; Ret | AME; DNS | ARG | SPA; Ret | FRA; 15 | ITA; 9 | CAT; Ret | NED; 22 | GER; 15 | INP; 7 | CZE; 17 | GBR; 15 | RSM; 11 | ARA; 12 | JPN; Ret | AUS; 24 | MAL; 11 | VAL; 8 | 19th | 41 |
| 2016 | Moto2 | Kalex | QAT; Ret | ARG; 8 | AME; 22 | SPA; Ret | FRA; 7 | ITA; 6 | CAT; 9 | NED; Ret | GER; Ret | AUT; 9 | CZE; Ret | GBR; 10 | RSM; Ret | ARA; 16 | JPN; Ret | AUS; 8 | MAL; Ret | VAL; Ret | 16th | 55 |
| 2017 | Moto2 | Kalex | QAT; 10 | ARG; Ret | AME; 18 | SPA; 10 | FRA; 15 | ITA; 21 | CAT; 18 | NED; 22 | GER; DNS | CZE; 16 | AUT; 13 | GBR; 15 | RSM; DNS | ARA; Ret | JPN; 18 | AUS; 11 | MAL; Ret | VAL; 11 | 19th | 27 |
