= 2009 Japanese motorcycle Grand Prix =

(Japan) 2009 Japanese Grand Prix
Race details
- Race 2 of 17 races in the 2009 Grand Prix motorcycle racing season
- Date: 26 April 2009
- Official name: Polini Grand Prix of Japan
- Location: Twin Ring Motegi
- Course: Permanent racing facility; 4.801 km (2.983 mi)

MotoGP
Pole position
- Rider: (Italy) Valentino Rossi
- Time: 1:48.545
Fastest lap
- Rider: (Spain) Jorge Lorenzo
- Time: 1:48.477
Podium
- First: (Spain) Jorge Lorenzo
- Second: (Italy) Valentino Rossi
- Third: (Spain) Dani Pedrosa

250cc
Pole position
- Rider: (Italy) Marco Simoncelli
- Time: 1:53.093
Fastest lap
- Rider: (Spain) Álvaro Bautista
- Time: 1:54.047
Podium
- First: (Spain) Álvaro Bautista
- Second: (Japan) Hiroshi Aoyama
- Third: (Italy) Mattia Pasini

125cc
Pole position
- Rider: (Italy) Andrea Iannone
- Time: 2:00.685
Fastest lap
- Rider: (Italy) Andrea Iannone
- Time: 2:01.551
Podium
- First: (Italy) Andrea Iannone
- Second: (Spain) Julián Simón
- Third: (Spain) Pol Espargaró

The 2009 Japanese motorcycle Grand Prix was the second round of the 2009 Grand Prix motorcycle racing season. It took place on the weekend of 24–26 April 2009 at the Twin Ring Motegi, located in Motegi, Japan. The MotoGP race was the 700th premier class race in the history of Grand Prix motorcycle racing. Jorge Lorenzo won the MotoGP race ahead of teammate Valentino Rossi to take the overall lead in the world championship.

== Qualifying ==
All qualifying sessions for MotoGP, 250cc and 125cc were cancelled due to adverse weather conditions and grid positions for Sunday's races were defined according to combined free practice times.

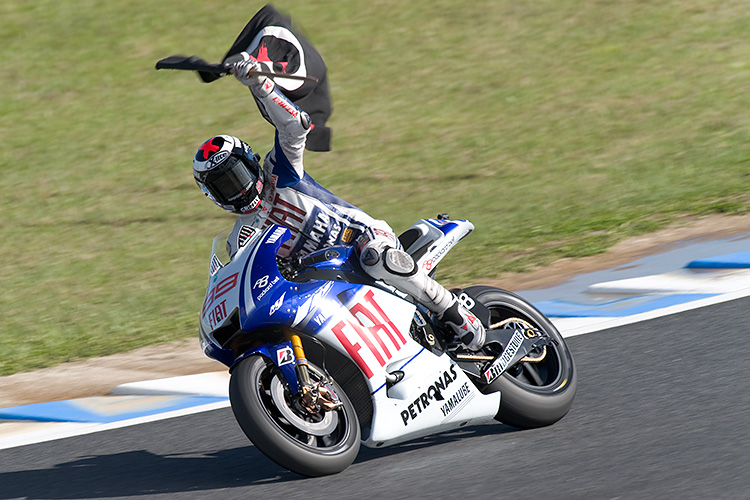
Jorge Lorenzo, celebrating with his flag after winning the MotoGP race.

== MotoGP classification ==
Pos.	No.	Rider	Team	Manufacturer	Laps	Time/Retired	Grid	Points
1	99	(Spain) Jorge Lorenzo	Fiat Yamaha Team	Yamaha	24	43:47.238	3	25
2	46	(Italy) Valentino Rossi	Fiat Yamaha Team	Yamaha	24	+1.304	1	20
3	3	(Spain) Dani Pedrosa	Repsol Honda Team	Honda	24	+3.763	11	16
4	27	(Australia) Casey Stoner	Ducati Marlboro Team	Ducati	24	+5.691	2	13
5	4	(Italy) Andrea Dovizioso	Repsol Honda Team	Honda	24	+9.207	7	11
6	33	(Italy) Marco Melandri	Hayate Racing Team	Kawasaki	24	+30.555	8	10
7	65	(Italy) Loris Capirossi	Rizla Suzuki MotoGP	Suzuki	24	+32.756	6	9
8	36	(Finland) Mika Kallio	Pramac Racing	Ducati	24	+39.416	17	8
9	52	(United Kingdom) James Toseland	Monster Yamaha Tech 3	Yamaha	24	+43.106	10	7
10	7	(Australia) Chris Vermeulen	Rizla Suzuki MotoGP	Suzuki	24	+43.245	4	6
11	14	(France) Randy de Puniet	LCR Honda MotoGP	Honda	24	+44.834	16	5
12	5	(United States) Colin Edwards	Monster Yamaha Tech 3	Yamaha	24	+46.540	5	4
13	15	(San Marino) Alex de Angelis	San Carlo Honda Gresini	Honda	24	+53.525	15	3
14	88	(Italy) Niccolò Canepa	Pramac Racing	Ducati	24	+1:21.804	18	2
15	24	(Spain) Toni Elías	San Carlo Honda Gresini	Honda	23	+1 lap	9	1
Ret	59	(Spain) Sete Gibernau	Grupo Francisco Hernando	Ducati	17	Retirement	14	
Ret	69	(United States) Nicky Hayden	Ducati Marlboro Team	Ducati	0	Accident	12	
Ret	72	(Japan) Yuki Takahashi	Scot Racing Team MotoGP	Honda	0	Accident	13	

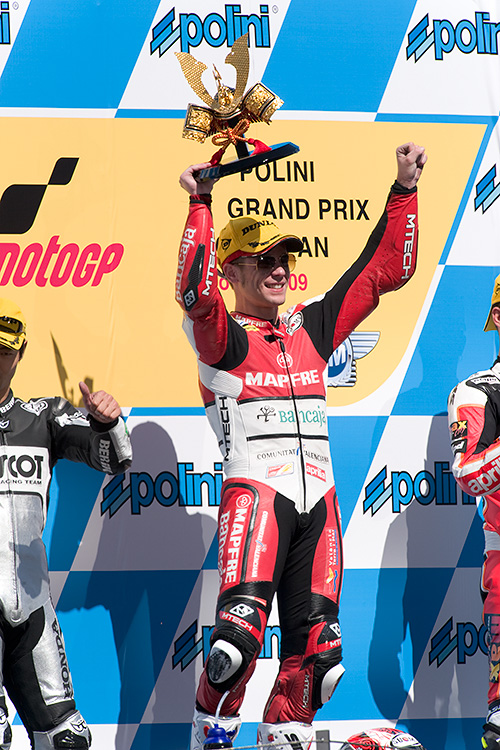
Álvaro Bautista, celebrating on the podium after winning the 250cc race.

== 250 cc classification ==
Pos.	No.	Rider	Manufacturer	Laps	Time/Retired	Grid	Points
1	19	(Spain) Álvaro Bautista	Aprilia	23	44:06.488	3	25
2	4	(Japan) Hiroshi Aoyama	Honda	23	+5.889	2	20
3	75	(Italy) Mattia Pasini	Aprilia	23	+21.832	4	16
4	28	(Hungary) Gábor Talmácsi	Aprilia	23	+25.906	7	13
5	6	(Spain) Alex Debón	Aprilia	23	+30.785	10	11
6	73	(Japan) Shuhei Aoyama	Honda	23	+33.788	17	10
7	52	(Czech Republic) Lukáš Pešek	Aprilia	23	+36.972	11	9
8	12	(Switzerland) Thomas Lüthi	Aprilia	23	+41.018	13	8
9	17	(Czech Republic) Karel Abraham	Aprilia	23	+41.649	16	7
10	48	(Japan) Shoya Tomizawa	Honda	23	+52.863	25	6
11	40	(Spain) Héctor Barberá	Aprilia	23	+1:00.888	5	5
12	35	(Italy) Raffaele De Rosa	Honda	23	+1:06.347	6	4
13	10	(Hungary) Imre Tóth	Aprilia	23	+1:53.149	20	3
14	59	(Japan) Kazuki Watanabe	Yamaha	22	+1 lap	19	2
15	56	(Russia) Vladimir Leonov	Aprilia	22	+1 lap	22	1
16	8	(Switzerland) Bastien Chesaux	Honda	22	+1 lap	23	
17	58	(Italy) Marco Simoncelli	Gilera	22	+1 lap	1	
18	77	(Spain) Aitor Rodríguez	Aprilia	22	+1 lap	24	
Ret	14	(Thailand) Ratthapark Wilairot	Honda	18	Accident	12	
Ret	25	(Italy) Alex Baldolini	Aprilia	17	Accident	18	
Ret	55	(Spain) Héctor Faubel	Honda	6	Accident	15	
Ret	63	(France) Mike Di Meglio	Aprilia	5	Accident	8	
Ret	7	(Spain) Axel Pons	Aprilia	3	Accident	21	
Ret	16	(France) Jules Cluzel	Aprilia	2	Accident	14	
Ret	15	(Italy) Roberto Locatelli	Gilera	2	Accident	9	
OFFICIAL 250cc REPORT

== 125 cc classification ==
Pos.	No.	Rider	Manufacturer	Laps	Time/Retired	Grid	Points
1	29	(Italy) Andrea Iannone	Aprilia	20	42:23.716	1	25
2	60	(Spain) Julián Simón	Aprilia	20	+1.346	2	20
3	44	(Spain) Pol Espargaró	Derbi	20	+5.039	8	16
4	17	(Germany) Stefan Bradl	Aprilia	20	+6.904	3	13
5	93	(Spain) Marc Márquez	KTM	20	+13.061	10	11
6	11	(Germany) Sandro Cortese	Derbi	20	+14.841	9	10
7	6	(Spain) Joan Olivé	Derbi	20	+16.420	11	9
8	94	(Germany) Jonas Folger	Aprilia	20	+16.483	14	8
9	77	(Switzerland) Dominique Aegerter	Derbi	20	+27.500	6	7
10	38	(United Kingdom) Bradley Smith	Aprilia	20	+30.359	7	6
11	99	(United Kingdom) Danny Webb	Aprilia	20	+37.547	13	5
12	71	(Japan) Tomoyoshi Koyama	Loncin	20	+43.856	19	4
13	12	(Spain) Esteve Rabat	Aprilia	20	+59.889	4	3
14	8	(Italy) Lorenzo Zanetti	Aprilia	20	+1:00.141	15	2
15	24	(Italy) Simone Corsi	Aprilia	20	+1:02.601	17	1
16	16	(United States) Cameron Beaubier	KTM	20	+1:02.609	23	
17	18	(Spain) Nicolás Terol	Aprilia	20	+1:09.867	5	
18	35	(Switzerland) Randy Krummenacher	Aprilia	20	+1:09.883	22	
19	33	(Spain) Sergio Gadea	Aprilia	20	+1:15.049	12	
20	73	(Japan) Takaaki Nakagami	Aprilia	20	+1:19.858	21	
21	5	(France) Alexis Masbou	Loncin	20	+1:43.413	25	
22	7	(Spain) Efrén Vázquez	Derbi	20	+1:52.910	20	
23	69	(Czech Republic) Lukáš Šembera	Aprilia	20	+2:07.124	32	
24	58	(Japan) Yuuichi Yanagisawa	Honda	20	+2:07.402	26	
25	87	(Italy) Luca Marconi	Aprilia	19	+1 lap	30	
26	10	(Italy) Luca Vitali	Aprilia	19	+1 lap	34	
27	55	(Japan) Hiroomi Iwata	Honda	19	+1 lap	29	
28	59	(Japan) Satoru Kamada	Honda	19	+1 lap	28	
29	57	(Japan) Yuki Oogane	Honda	18	+2 laps	33	
Ret	56	(Japan) Yuma Yahagi	Honda	11	Retirement	27	
Ret	14	(France) Johann Zarco	Aprilia	10	Retirement	18	
Ret	45	(United Kingdom) Scott Redding	Aprilia	6	Retirement	16	
Ret	32	(Italy) Lorenzo Savadori	Aprilia	2	Accident	24	
Ret	53	(Netherlands) Jasper Iwema	Honda	0	Accident	31	
DNS	88	(Austria) Michael Ranseder	Haojue		Did not start		
DNQ	66	(United Kingdom) Matthew Hoyle	Haojue		Did not qualify		
OFFICIAL 125cc REPORT

== Championship standings after the race (MotoGP) ==
Below are the standings for the top five riders and constructors after round two has concluded.

Riders' Championship standings

Pos.	Rider	Points
1	(Spain) Jorge Lorenzo	41
2	(Italy) Valentino Rossi	40
3	(Australia) Casey Stoner	38
4	(Italy) Andrea Dovizioso	22
5	(Spain) Dani Pedrosa	21

Constructors' Championship standings

Pos.	Constructor	Points
1	(Japan) Yamaha	45
2	(Italy) Ducati	38
3	(Japan) Honda	27
4	(Japan) Suzuki	18
5	(Japan) Kawasaki	12

- Note: Only the top five positions are included for both sets of standings.

Previous race: 2009 Qatar Grand Prix	FIM Grand Prix World Championship; 2009 season	Next race: 2009 Spanish Grand Prix
Previous race: 2008 Japanese Grand Prix	Japanese motorcycle Grand Prix	Next race: 2010 Japanese Grand Prix
