= 2009 Qatar motorcycle Grand Prix =

2009 Qatar Grand Prix
Race details
- Race 1 of 17 races in the 2009 Grand Prix motorcycle racing season
- Date: 12–13 April 2009
- Official name: Commercialbank Grand Prix of Qatar
- Location: Losail International Circuit
- Course: Permanent racing facility; 5.380 km (3.343 mi)

MotoGP
Pole position
- Rider: (Australia) Casey Stoner
- Time: 1:55.286
Fastest lap
- Rider: (Australia) Casey Stoner
- Time: 1:55.844
Podium
- First: (Australia) Casey Stoner
- Second: (Italy) Valentino Rossi
- Third: (Spain) Jorge Lorenzo

250cc
Pole position
- Rider: (Spain) Álvaro Bautista
- Time: 2:00.677
Fastest lap
- Rider: (Japan) Hiroshi Aoyama
- Time: 2:01.752
Podium
- First: (Spain) Héctor Barberá
- Second: (France) Jules Cluzel
- Third: (France) Mike Di Meglio

125cc
Pole position
- Rider: (Spain) Julián Simón
- Time: 2:06.974
Fastest lap
- Rider: (Spain) Julián Simón
- Time: 2:06.969
Podium
- First: (Italy) Andrea Iannone
- Second: (Spain) Julián Simón
- Third: (Germany) Sandro Cortese

The 2009 Qatar motorcycle Grand Prix was the opening round of the 2009 MotoGP championship. It had originally been due to place on the weekend of 10–12 April 2009 at the Losail International Circuit located in Doha, Qatar. However, the meeting was extended to 13 April, as the MotoGP race was postponed to this date, due to adverse weather conditions on 12 April. The problems were compounded by the event being held at night under floodlights for the benefit of European TV viewers.

This was the last MotoGP round in which a tobacco brand name (Marlboro) was visible on a bike.

== Report ==
The whole Grand Prix was disrupted by a rare event of rain in Doha, coupled with the impossibility of racing in the wet under floodlights. The 125cc race started at the scheduled time, despite rain being forecast sometime during the race. During the third lap rain began to fall, and the race was finally called after the fourth lap. Shortly after, it was decided to consider the race finished, so Andrea Iannone, who was leading at the time the red flag was exposed, was declared the winner and half points were given, since they failed to complete two thirds of the full race distance (18 laps). This was lucky for Julián Simón as he had crashed after the red flag was shown, and manage to recover back to the track, and was thus classified in second.

After this, talk began to decide whether to race the other two classes or not, since racing with rain in the night could pose a serious threat to riders' safety due to the glare off the track. The organizers, together with safety representative Franco Uncini and riders including Valentino Rossi and Loris Capirossi, made several reconnaissance journeys around the track, which was drying after rain stopped to fall. It was ultimately decided to start the 250cc race, 40 minutes after it was originally scheduled to run. The original race distance of 20 laps was reduced to 13 laps, allowing full points to be awarded while not causing a delay to the MotoGP race. The race went on without problems, and Héctor Barberá won the race ahead of a surprising Jules Cluzel. A frantic multi-bike battle for third place ultimately saw Mike Di Meglio finish third after overtaking teammate Álvaro Bautista and Raffaele De Rosa on the final lap; Hiroshi Aoyama also passed those riders to take 4th place.

MotoGP was kept in its original timeslot. However, shortly before the formation lap, rain began to fall again, and the intensity this time was much higher than the previous. The organisers decided to cancel the event, since the track was too damp to race. After negotiations, it was decided to move the race to the following day, in hope of better weather conditions. The start time was also moved to 21:00 local time, having originally been 23:00.

The Monday race started without problems. The victory went to Casey Stoner, who made a good start from pole and then led the entire race, pulling a comfortable gap over his opponents. Valentino Rossi finished second; he tried to catch the Australian, coming as near as two seconds from him, but ultimately he had to settle for second, his Yamaha suffering with tyre problems. Third was Jorge Lorenzo, coming a distant 16 seconds from Stoner.

== MotoGP classification ==
Pos.	No.	Rider	Team	Manufacturer	Laps	Time	Grid	Points
1	27	(Australia) Casey Stoner	Ducati Marlboro Team	Ducati	22	42:53.984	1	25
2	46	(Italy) Valentino Rossi	Fiat Yamaha Team	Yamaha	22	+7.771	2	20
3	99	(Spain) Jorge Lorenzo	Fiat Yamaha Team	Yamaha	22	+16.244	3	16
4	5	(United States) Colin Edwards	Monster Yamaha Tech 3	Yamaha	22	+24.410	6	13
5	4	(Italy) Andrea Dovizioso	Repsol Honda Team	Honda	22	+27.263	4	11
6	15	(San Marino) Alex de Angelis	San Carlo Honda Gresini	Honda	22	+29.883	9	10
7	7	(Australia) Chris Vermeulen	Rizla Suzuki MotoGP	Suzuki	22	+33.627	8	9
8	36	(Finland) Mika Kallio	Pramac Racing	Ducati	22	+34.755	10	8
9	24	(Spain) Toni Elías	San Carlo Honda Gresini	Honda	22	+39.481	12	7
10	14	(France) Randy de Puniet	LCR Honda MotoGP	Honda	22	+42.284	7	6
11	3	(Spain) Dani Pedrosa	Repsol Honda Team	Honda	22	+48.526	14	5
12	69	(United States) Nicky Hayden	Ducati Marlboro Team	Ducati	22	+48.883	16	4
13	59	(Spain) Sete Gibernau	Grupo Francisco Hernando	Ducati	22	+52.215	15	3
14	33	(Italy) Marco Melandri	Hayate Racing Team	Kawasaki	22	+56.379	11	2
15	72	(Japan) Yuki Takahashi	Scot Racing Team MotoGP	Honda	22	+1:00.286	17	1
16	52	(United Kingdom) James Toseland	Monster Yamaha Tech 3	Yamaha	22	+1:14.978	13	
17	88	(Italy) Niccolò Canepa	Pramac Racing	Ducati	22	+1:15.028	18	
Ret	65	(Italy) Loris Capirossi	Rizla Suzuki MotoGP	Suzuki	7	Accident	5	

== 250 cc classification ==
Pos.	No.	Rider	Manufacturer	Laps	Time/Retired	Grid	Points
1	40	(Spain) Héctor Barberá	Aprilia	13	26:50.940	4	25
2	16	(France) Jules Cluzel	Aprilia	13	+0.826	13	20
3	63	(France) Mike Di Meglio	Aprilia	13	+6.181	3	16
4	4	(Japan) Hiroshi Aoyama	Honda	13	+6.609	2	13
5	35	(Italy) Raffaele De Rosa	Honda	13	+6.656	14	11
6	12	(Switzerland) Thomas Lüthi	Aprilia	13	+6.672	9	10
7	19	(Spain) Álvaro Bautista	Aprilia	13	+7.608	1	9
8	14	(Thailand) Ratthapark Wilairot	Honda	13	+8.349	12	8
9	15	(Italy) Roberto Locatelli	Gilera	13	+15.032	10	7
10	28	(Hungary) Gábor Talmácsi	Aprilia	13	+20.348	6	6
11	55	(Spain) Héctor Faubel	Honda	13	+20.465	5	5
12	48	(Japan) Shoya Tomizawa	Honda	13	+28.402	16	4
13	52	(Czech Republic) Lukáš Pešek	Aprilia	13	+28.906	15	3
14	6	(Spain) Alex Debón	Aprilia	13	+33.779	8	2
15	25	(Italy) Alex Baldolini	Aprilia	13	+36.988	17	1
16	8	(Switzerland) Bastien Chesaux	Honda	13	+1:01.730	21	
17	10	(Hungary) Imre Tóth	Aprilia	13	+1:03.512	18	
18	56	(Russia) Vladimir Leonov	Aprilia	13	+1:32.385	20	
19	77	(Spain) Aitor Rodríguez	Aprilia	13	+1:38.752	22	
Ret	17	(Czech Republic) Karel Abraham	Aprilia	8	Retirement	11	
Ret	7	(Spain) Axel Pons	Aprilia	0	Accident	19	
Ret	75	(Italy) Mattia Pasini	Aprilia	0	Retirement	7	
DNS	58	(Italy) Marco Simoncelli	Gilera		Did not start		
OFFICIAL 250cc REPORT

== 125 cc classification ==
Pos.	No.	Rider	Manufacturer	Laps	Time/Retired	Grid	Points
1	29	(Italy) Andrea Iannone	Aprilia	4	8:37.245	3	12.5
2	60	(Spain) Julián Simón	Aprilia	4	+0.180	1	10
3	11	(Germany) Sandro Cortese	Derbi	4	+5.211	5	8
4	44	(Spain) Pol Espargaró	Derbi	4	+5.769	8	6.5
5	38	(United Kingdom) Bradley Smith	Aprilia	4	+6.650	2	5.5
6	94	(Germany) Jonas Folger	Aprilia	4	+6.701	10	5
7	18	(Spain) Nicolás Terol	Aprilia	4	+6.771	4	4.5
8	17	(Germany) Stefan Bradl	Aprilia	4	+7.592	7	4
9	99	(United Kingdom) Danny Webb	Aprilia	4	+8.169	13	3.5
10	12	(Spain) Esteve Rabat	Aprilia	4	+8.678	15	3
11	77	(Switzerland) Dominique Aegerter	Derbi	4	+12.232	18	2.5
12	33	(Spain) Sergio Gadea	Aprilia	4	+12.237	6	2
13	45	(United Kingdom) Scott Redding	Aprilia	4	+12.360	11	1.5
14	24	(Italy) Simone Corsi	Aprilia	4	+13.754	19	1
15	14	(France) Johann Zarco	Aprilia	4	+13.783	14	0.5
16	16	(United States) Cameron Beaubier	KTM	4	+13.893	22	
17	7	(Spain) Efrén Vázquez	Derbi	4	+14.170	21	
18	6	(Spain) Joan Olivé	Derbi	4	+14.452	12	
19	8	(Italy) Lorenzo Zanetti	Aprilia	4	+15.310	20	
20	73	(Japan) Takaaki Nakagami	Aprilia	4	+16.415	16	
21	32	(Italy) Lorenzo Savadori	Aprilia	4	+18.602	23	
22	35	(Switzerland) Randy Krummenacher	Aprilia	4	+19.355	17	
23	53	(Netherlands) Jasper Iwema	Honda	4	+28.034	25	
24	87	(Italy) Luca Marconi	Aprilia	4	+28.114	24	
25	69	(Czech Republic) Lukáš Šembera	Aprilia	4	+28.199	25	
26	5	(France) Alexis Masbou	Loncin	4	+28.272	28	
27	71	(Japan) Tomoyoshi Koyama	Loncin	4	+28.544	27	
28	10	(Italy) Luca Vitali	Aprilia	4	+53.927	30	
Ret	93	(Spain) Marc Márquez	KTM	3	Accident	9	
Ret	88	(Austria) Michael Ranseder	Haojue	3	Mechanical	29	
DNS	66	(United Kingdom) Matthew Hoyle	Haojue	0	Did not start	31	
OFFICIAL 125cc REPORT

== Championship standings after the race (MotoGP) ==
Below are the standings for the top five riders and constructors after round one has concluded.

Riders' Championship standings

Pos.	Rider	Points
1	(Australia) Casey Stoner	25
2	(Italy) Valentino Rossi	20
3	(Spain) Jorge Lorenzo	16
4	(United States) Colin Edwards	13
5	(Italy) Andrea Dovizioso	11

Constructors' Championship standings

Pos.	Constructor	Points
1	(Italy) Ducati	25
2	(Japan) Yamaha	20
3	(Japan) Honda	11
4	(Japan) Suzuki	9
5	(Japan) Kawasaki	2

- Note: Only the top five positions are included for both sets of standings.

Previous race: 2008 Valencian Grand Prix	FIM Grand Prix World Championship; 2009 season	Next race: 2009 Japanese Grand Prix
Previous race: 2008 Qatar Grand Prix	Qatar motorcycle Grand Prix	Next race: 2010 Qatar Grand Prix
