= Jules Cluzel =

French former motorcycle racer

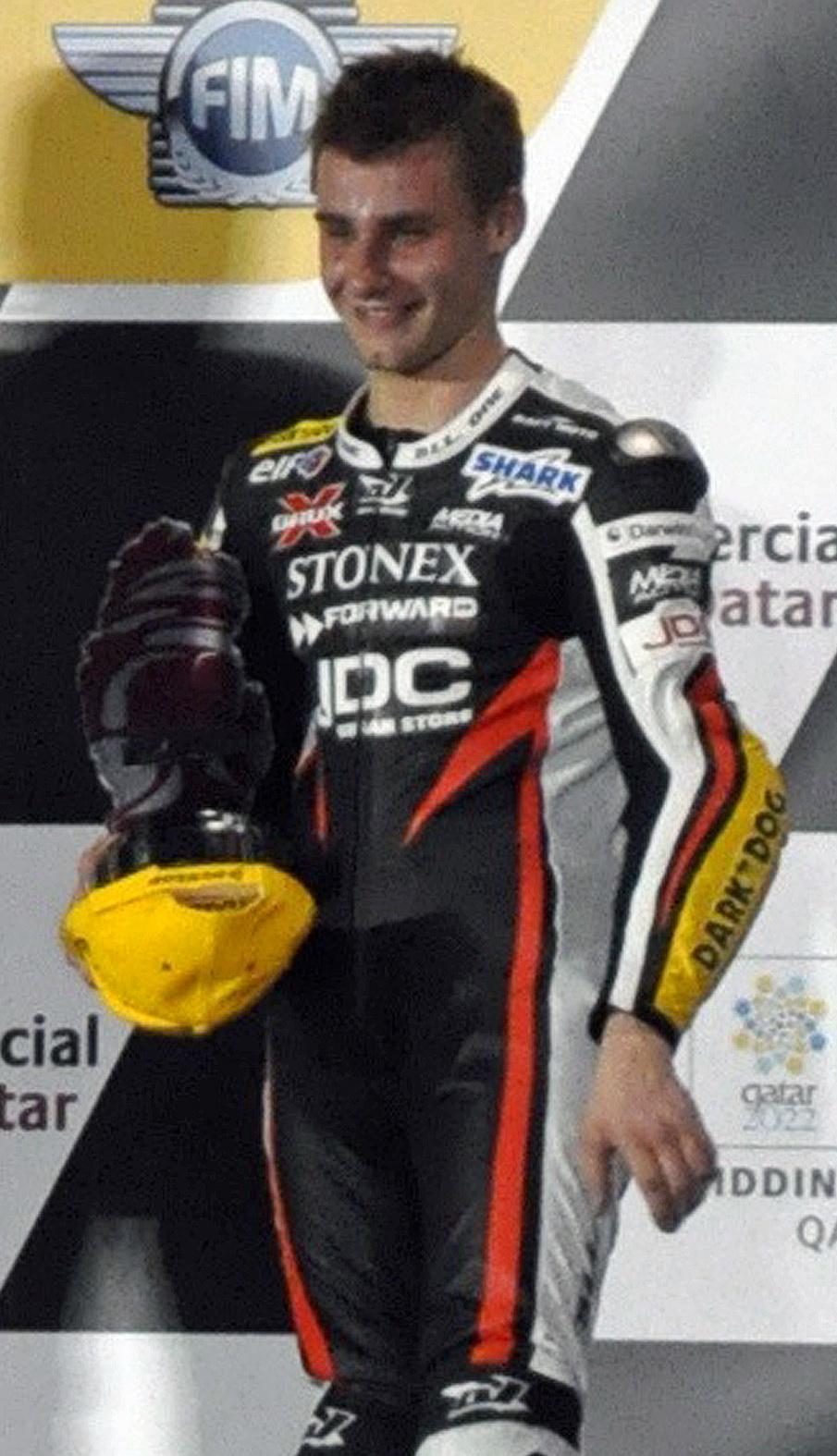
- Cluzel at the 2010 Qatar Grand Prix
- Nationality: French
- Born: 12 October 1988 (age 38); Montluçon, Allier, France
- Current team: GMT94 Yamaha
- Bike number: 16
Motorcycle racing career statistics
Moto2 World Championship
Active years	2010–2011
Manufacturers	Suter
Championships	0
2011 championship position	21st (41 pts)
Starts / Wins / Podiums / Poles / F. laps / Points; 34 / 1 / 2 / 0 / 1 / 147
250cc World Championship
Active years	2006–2007, 2009
Manufacturers	Aprilia
Championships	0
2009 championship position	12th (82 pts)
Starts / Wins / Podiums / Poles / F. laps / Points; 48 / 0 / 1 / 0 / 0 / 116
125cc World Championship
Active years	2005, 2008
Manufacturers	Honda, Malaguti, Loncin
Championships	0
2008 championship position	NC (0 pts)
Starts / Wins / Podiums / Poles / F. laps / Points; 18 / 0 / 0 / 0 / 0 / 0
Superbike World Championship
Active years	2013
Manufacturers	Suzuki
Championships	0
2013 championship position	10th (175 pts)
Starts / Wins / Podiums / Poles / F. laps / Points; 27 / 0 / 1 / 0 / 0 / 175
Supersport World Championship
Active years	2012, 2014–2022
Manufacturers	Honda, MV Agusta, Yamaha
Championships	0
2022 championship position	10th (132 pts)
Starts / Wins / Podiums / Poles / F. laps / Points; 134 / 24 / 63 / 24 / 17 / 1764

Jules Cluzel (born 12 October 1988 in Montluçon, Allier) is a French former motorcycle racer.

At the end of 2015, Cluzel was awarded the Pirelli Best Lap Award for setting the most fastest laps in the 2015 Supersport World Championship.

In 2019, Cluzel competed in the Supersport World Championship riding a Yamaha YZF-R6. He scored his first ever Grand Prix victory at Silverstone in Moto2 in 2010.

After retiring from competition in 2022, from 2023, Cluzel is a rider-coach for Yamaha Thailand, a Supersport World Championship team.

== Career statistics ==
=== Grand Prix motorcycle racing ===
==== Races by year ====
(key) (Races in bold indicate pole position; races in italics indicate fastest lap)

Year	Class	Bike	1	2	3	4	5	6	7	8	9	10	11	12	13	14	15	16	17	Pos	Pts
2005	125cc	Honda	SPA	POR	CHN	FRA; Ret	ITA	CAT	NED	GBR	GER	CZE	JPN	MAL	QAT	AUS				NC	0
2005	125cc	Malaguti															TUR; 22	VAL; Ret		NC	0
2006	250cc	Aprilia	SPA; Ret	QAT; Ret	TUR; 16	CHN; 18	FRA; Ret	ITA; Ret	CAT; 13	NED; Ret	GBR; 14	GER; 18	CZE; Ret	MAL; 10	AUS; 12	JPN; 17	POR; Ret	VAL; Ret		20th	15
2007	250cc	Aprilia	QAT; 16	SPA; 16	TUR; Ret	CHN; 16	FRA; Ret	ITA; 19	CAT; 13	GBR; Ret	NED; 20	GER; 15	CZE; 18	RSM; 11	POR; 13	JPN; 13	AUS; 12	MAL; 19	VAL; Ret	21st	19
2008	125cc	Loncin	QAT; Ret	SPA; 17	POR; Ret	CHN; DNS	FRA	ITA; 23	CAT; 20	GBR; 16	NED; 18	GER; Ret	CZE; 24	RSM; 16	INP; 16	JPN; Ret	AUS; Ret	MAL; 16	VAL; 19	NC	0
2009	250cc	Aprilia	QAT; 2	JPN; Ret	SPA; 8	FRA; DNS	ITA; Ret	CAT; 11	NED; Ret	GER; 14	GBR; 11	CZE; 8	INP; Ret	RSM; 6	POR; 5	AUS; 4	MAL; Ret	VAL; Ret		12th	82
2010	Moto2	Suter	QAT; 3	SPA; 11	FRA; Ret	ITA; Ret	GBR; 1	NED; 7	CAT; 14	GER; 12	CZE; 4	INP; Ret	RSM; 6	ARA; 6	JPN; 16	MAL; 9	AUS; 23	POR; 17	VAL; 11	7th	106
2011	Moto2	Suter	QAT; 7	SPA; Ret	POR; Ret	FRA; 11	CAT; 23	GBR; 4	NED; Ret	ITA; 15	GER; 9	CZE; Ret	INP; 16	RSM; Ret	ARA; Ret	JPN; 16	AUS; Ret	MAL; 13	VAL; 13	21st	41

=== Supersport World Championship ===
==== Races by year ====
(key) (Races in bold indicate pole position; races in italics indicate fastest lap)

Year	Bike	1	2	3	4	5	6	7	8	9	10	11	12	13	14	15	16	17	18	19	20	21	22	23	24	Pos	Pts
2012	Honda	AUS; 4	ITA; Ret	NED; 6	ITA; 1	**EUR**; 3	SMR; 2	**SPA**; Ret	CZE; 5	**GBR**; 1	**RUS**; 2	**GER**; 2	POR; 1	FRA; 1												2nd	210
2014	MV Agusta	AUS; 1	SPA; Ret	NED; 3	**ITA**; 15	GBR; 2	**MAL**; 2	**ITA**; 1	POR; Ret	SPA; Ret	**FRA**; 1	**QAT**; 3														2nd	148
2015	MV Agusta	**AUS**; 1	THA; Ret	**SPA**; Ret	**NED**; 2	**ITA**; 2	GBR; 2	**POR**; 1	**ITA**; 1	MAL; 2	SPA; WD	FRA	QAT													4th	155
2016	MV Agusta	AUS; 17	**THA**; 1	SPA; 4	NED; 18	**ITA**; 2	MAL; 7	GBR; 8	ITA; Ret	GER; 3	FRA; 1	SPA; 6	QAT; 3													2nd	142
2017	Honda	AUS; Ret	**THA**; Ret	SPA; 4	NED; 3	ITA; 6	GBR; 3	ITA; 2	GER; 4	POR; 3	FRA; 5	SPA; 2	QAT; 2													3rd	155
2018	Yamaha	AUS; 7	THA; Ret	SPA; 3	NED; 1	ITA; 1	**GBR**; 2	CZE; 1	ITA; 4	POR; Ret	FRA; 1	ARG; 1	QAT; Ret													3rd	183
2019	Yamaha	AUS; 2	**THA**; 1	SPA; 5	NED; 4	ITA; 7	SPA; 3	ITA; 4	GBR; 1	POR; 4	FRA; 6	ARG; 1	QAT; 2													3rd	200
2020	Yamaha	AUS; 2	SPA; 2	SPA; 2	POR; 6	POR; 2	SPA; 2	SPA; 2	SPA; 3	SPA; Ret	SPA	SPA	FRA	FRA	POR; 9	POR; 9										4th	160
2021	Yamaha	**SPA**; Ret	**SPA**; 3	POR; 3	POR; 12	ITA; 4	ITA; 3	NED; 4	NED; 4	CZE; 7	CZE; Ret	SPA; 4	SPA; 5	FRA; 3	FRA; Ret	SPA	SPA	SPA; C	SPA; 10	**POR**; 1	**POR**; 2	**ARG**; 1	**ARG**; 1	INA; 4	INA; 1	4th	279
2022	Yamaha	SPA; 19	SPA; 6	NED; 4	NED; Ret	POR; Ret	POR; Ret	ITA; 7	ITA; 9	GBR; Ret	GBR; DNS	CZE	CZE	FRA; 10	FRA; 2	SPA; 8	SPA; 15	POR; 7	POR; 6	ARG; 6	ARG; 6	INA; 8	INA; 10	AUS; Ret	AUS; 11	10th	132

=== Superbike World Championship ===
==== Races by year ====
(key) (Races in bold indicate pole position; races in italics indicate fastest lap)

Year	Bike	1		2		3		4		5		6		7		8		9		10		11		12		13		14		Pos	Pts
Year	Bike	R1	R2	R1	R2	R1	R2	R1	R2	R1	R2	R1	R2	R1	R2	R1	R2	R1	R2	R1	R2	R1	R2	R1	R2	R1	R2	R1	R2	Pos	Pts
2013	Suzuki	AUS; 11	AUS; 7	SPA; 6	SPA; 7	NED; 8	NED; Ret	ITA; 17	ITA; Ret	GBR; 9	GBR; 9	POR; 8	POR; 7	ITA; Ret	ITA; 11	RUS; 10	RUS; C	GBR; 6	GBR; 2	GER; 8	GER; 14	TUR; 7	TUR; 7	USA; 7	USA; 6	FRA; Ret	FRA; 14	SPA; 11	SPA; 8	10th	175
