= Commercial Bank of Qatar =

Bank of Qatar

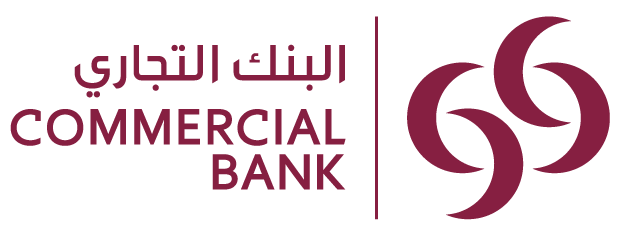
- Type: Public
- Traded as: QSE: PSQC
- Industry: Banking, Financial Services
- Founded: 1975
- Founders: Hussain Alfardan
- Headquarters: Doha, Qatar
- Key people: Sheikh Abdullah bin Ali Al-Thani (Chairman); Stephen Moss (CEO); Fahad Badar (Head of Wholesale Banking); Shahnawaz Rashid (Head of Retail Banking); Marlena Brzosko (Head of Wealth Management)
- Products: Retail Banking; Premium Banking; Corporate Banking; Wealth Management; Investment Banking
- Services: Loans, Accounts, Cards, Investments, Treasury Services, Digital Banking
- Revenue: QAR 4.3 billion (2023)
- Net income: QAR 1.1 billion (2023)
- Total assets: QAR 68.5 billion (2023)
- Total equity: QAR 7.8 billion (2023)
- Website: www.cbq.qa

The Commercial Bank of Qatar (P.S.Q.C.) (CBQ) commonly known as Commercial Bank, is a private sector bank operating in Qatar since 1975. The bank offers a range of products and services across retail, corporate banking, and wealth management divisions.

== History ==
Commercial Bank of Qatar was established in 1975 by Hussain Alfardan as the first private bank in Qatar. S
