= 2010 San Marino and Rimini Riviera motorcycle Grand Prix =

12th round of the 2010 FIM Road Racing World Championship season

2010 San Marino and Rimini Riviera Grand Prix
Race details
- Race 12 of 18 races in the 2010 Grand Prix motorcycle racing season
- Date: 5 September 2010
- Official name: Gran Premio Aperol di San Marino e Riviera di Rimini
- Location: Misano World Circuit
- Course: Permanent racing facility; 4.226 km (2.626 mi)

MotoGP
Pole position
- Rider: (Spain) Dani Pedrosa
- Time: 1:33.948
Fastest lap
- Rider: (Spain) Dani Pedrosa
- Time: 1:34.340
Podium
- First: (Spain) Dani Pedrosa
- Second: (Spain) Jorge Lorenzo
- Third: (Italy) Valentino Rossi

Moto2
Pole position
- Rider: (Spain) Toni Elías
- Time: 1:38.991
Fastest lap
- Rider: (San Marino) Alex de Angelis
- Time: 1:39.430
Podium
- First: (Spain) Toni Elías
- Second: (Spain) Julián Simón
- Third: (Switzerland) Thomas Lüthi

125cc
Pole position
- Rider: (United Kingdom) Bradley Smith
- Time: 1:43.329
Fastest lap
- Rider: (Spain) Marc Márquez
- Time: 1:43.195
Podium
- First: (Spain) Marc Márquez
- Second: (Spain) Nicolás Terol
- Third: (Spain) Efrén Vázquez

The 2010 San Marino and Rimini Riviera motorcycle Grand Prix was the twelfth round of the 2010 Grand Prix motorcycle racing season. It took place on the weekend of 3–5 September 2010 at the Misano World Circuit. The event was marred by the death of Shoya Tomizawa from injuries sustained in a crash during the Moto2 race.

== Death of Shoya Tomizawa ==
During the 12th lap of the Moto2 race, Shoya Tomizawa was riding in fourth position in a seven-bike pack. The pack consisted of Toni Elías who was leading the race, followed by Simone Corsi, Julián Simón, Tomizawa, Alex de Angelis, Scott Redding and Jules Cluzel. As the pack approached Turn 11, the very fast right-hander that is taken nearly flat out, Tomizawa lost control and crashed. He was thrown off his bike and onto the track, and de Angelis and Redding who were right behind both hit the Japanese rider at full speed. de Angelis walked away from the crash uninjured, but Redding and Tomizawa were taken to the medical center, the Japanese's conditions appearing critical; despite this, the race was not stopped.

Tomizawa was then rushed from the medical center to the hospital in Riccione, where he was pronounced dead at 14.20 local time, due to the injuries sustained in the crash.

== MotoGP classification ==
Pos.	No.	Rider	Team	Manufacturer	Laps	Time/Retired	Grid	Points
1	26	(Spain) Dani Pedrosa	Repsol Honda Team	Honda	28	44:22.059	1	25
2	99	(Spain) Jorge Lorenzo	Fiat Yamaha Team	Yamaha	28	+1.900	2	20
3	46	(Italy) Valentino Rossi	Fiat Yamaha Team	Yamaha	28	+3.183	4	16
4	4	(Italy) Andrea Dovizioso	Repsol Honda Team	Honda	28	+6.454	8	13
5	27	(Australia) Casey Stoner	Ducati Team	Ducati	28	+18.479	3	11
6	11	(United States) Ben Spies	Monster Yamaha Tech 3	Yamaha	28	+28.385	5	10
7	5	(United States) Colin Edwards	Monster Yamaha Tech 3	Yamaha	28	+34.934	7	9
8	19	(Spain) Álvaro Bautista	Rizla Suzuki MotoGP	Suzuki	28	+38.157	16	8
9	40	(Spain) Héctor Barberá	Páginas Amarillas Aspar	Ducati	28	+40.943	12	7
10	33	(Italy) Marco Melandri	San Carlo Honda Gresini	Honda	28	+42.377	10	6
11	41	(Spain) Aleix Espargaró	Pramac Racing Team	Ducati	28	+45.906	15	5
12	7	(Japan) Hiroshi Aoyama	Interwetten Honda MotoGP	Honda	28	+46.394	13	4
13	14	(France) Randy de Puniet	LCR Honda MotoGP	Honda	28	+50.481	6	3
14	58	(Italy) Marco Simoncelli	San Carlo Honda Gresini	Honda	28	+1:23.143	9	2
Ret	36	(Finland) Mika Kallio	Pramac Racing Team	Ducati	17	Retirement	17	
Ret	69	(United States) Nicky Hayden	Ducati Team	Ducati	3	Retirement	14	
Ret	65	(Italy) Loris Capirossi	Rizla Suzuki MotoGP	Suzuki	0	Accident	11	

== Moto2 classification ==
Pos.	No.	Rider	Manufacturer	Laps	Time/Retired	Grid	Points
1	24	(Spain) Toni Elías	Moriwaki	26	43:33.996	1	25
2	60	(Spain) Julián Simón	Suter	26	+1.969	3	20
3	12	(Switzerland) Thomas Lüthi	Moriwaki	26	+11.917	15	16
4	3	(Italy) Simone Corsi	Motobi	26	+15.409	6	13
5	65	(Germany) Stefan Bradl	Suter	26	+16.219	17	11
6	16	(France) Jules Cluzel	Suter	26	+16.676	4	10
7	2	(Hungary) Gábor Talmácsi	Speed Up	26	+16.852	10	9
8	77	(Switzerland) Dominique Aegerter	Suter	26	+18.330	12	8
9	71	(Italy) Claudio Corti	Suter	26	+20.650	14	7
10	44	(Italy) Roberto Rolfo	Suter	26	+29.678	24	6
11	68	(Colombia) Yonny Hernández	BQR-Moto2	26	+32.720	23	5
12	14	(Thailand) Ratthapark Wilairot	Bimota	26	+35.098	31	4
13	35	(Italy) Raffaele De Rosa	Tech 3	26	+35.428	27	3
14	56	(Austria) Michael Ranseder	Suter	26	+35.933	22	2
15	52	(Czech Republic) Lukáš Pešek	Moriwaki	26	+37.012	29	1
16	55	(Spain) Héctor Faubel	Suter	26	+40.950	11	
17	8	(Australia) Anthony West	MZ-RE Honda	26	+41.752	33	
18	80	(Spain) Axel Pons	Pons Kalex	26	+41.878	25	
19	19	(Belgium) Xavier Siméon	Moriwaki	26	+47.566	16	
20	4	(Spain) Ricky Cardús	Bimota	26	+57.026	36	
21	5	(Spain) Joan Olivé	FTR	26	+57.119	35	
22	53	(France) Valentin Debise	ADV	26	+1:00.833	30	
23	70	(Italy) Ferruccio Lamborghini	Suter	26	+1:02.316	20	
24	9	(United States) Kenny Noyes	Promoharris	26	+1:05.795	34	
25	99	(Japan) Tatsuya Yamaguchi	Moriwaki	26	+1:09.977	28	
26	88	(Spain) Yannick Guerra	Moriwaki	26	+1:16.520	38	
27	95	(Qatar) Mashel Al Naimi	BQR-Moto2	26	+1:16.563	37	
28	59	(Italy) Niccolò Canepa	Bimota	26	+1:17.479	32	
29	39	(Venezuela) Robertino Pietri	Suter	26	+1:41.039	26	
Ret	29	(Italy) Andrea Iannone	Speed Up	23	Retirement	5	
Ret	25	(Italy) Alex Baldolini	I.C.P.	23	Retirement	21	
Ret	72	(Japan) Yuki Takahashi	Tech 3	21	Accident	13	
Ret	40	(Spain) Sergio Gadea	Pons Kalex	14	Accident	18	
Ret	48	(Japan) Shoya Tomizawa	Suter	11	Collision/Fatal accident	8	
Ret	15	(San Marino) Alex de Angelis	Motobi	11	Collision	7	
Ret	45	(United Kingdom) Scott Redding	Suter	11	Collision	2	
Ret	75	(Italy) Mattia Pasini	Suter	10	Retirement	9	
Ret	63	(France) Mike Di Meglio	Suter	7	Accident	19	
DNS	17	(Czech Republic) Karel Abraham	FTR		Did not start		
OFFICIAL MOTO2 REPORT

== 125 cc classification ==
Pos.	No.	Rider	Manufacturer	Laps	Time/Retired	Grid	Points
1	93	(Spain) Marc Márquez	Derbi	23	39:56.117	2	25
2	40	(Spain) Nicolás Terol	Aprilia	23	+2.185	3	20
3	7	(Spain) Efrén Vázquez	Derbi	23	+5.628	7	16
4	38	(United Kingdom) Bradley Smith	Aprilia	23	+5.912	1	13
5	11	(Germany) Sandro Cortese	Derbi	23	+6.378	6	11
6	44	(Spain) Pol Espargaró	Derbi	23	+7.091	4	10
7	12	(Spain) Esteve Rabat	Aprilia	23	+23.835	8	9
8	71	(Japan) Tomoyoshi Koyama	Aprilia	23	+23.891	5	8
9	35	(Switzerland) Randy Krummenacher	Aprilia	23	+29.914	13	7
10	99	(United Kingdom) Danny Webb	Aprilia	23	+29.969	9	6
11	94	(Germany) Jonas Folger	Aprilia	23	+30.173	11	5
12	14	(France) Johann Zarco	Aprilia	23	+38.411	10	4
13	23	(Spain) Alberto Moncayo	Aprilia	23	+38.689	14	3
14	15	(Italy) Simone Grotzkyj	Aprilia	23	+46.494	15	2
15	26	(Spain) Adrián Martín	Aprilia	23	+46.569	16	1
16	84	(Czech Republic) Jakub Kornfeil	Aprilia	23	+1:00.269	19	
17	78	(Germany) Marcel Schrötter	Honda	23	+1:01.708	18	
18	97	(Italy) Armando Pontone	Aprilia	23	+1:07.377	22	
19	69	(France) Louis Rossi	Aprilia	23	+1:07.414	21	
20	95	(Italy) Alessandro Tonucci	Aprilia	23	+1:07.487	25	
21	53	(Netherlands) Jasper Iwema	Aprilia	23	+1:07.905	17	
22	96	(Italy) Tommaso Gabrielli	Aprilia	23	+1:29.668	27	
23	72	(Italy) Marco Ravaioli	Lambretta	23	+1:30.618	29	
24	76	(Italy) Francesco Mauriello	Aprilia	23	+1:30.641	26	
25	36	(Spain) Joan Perelló	Lambretta	22	+1 lap	28	
Ret	87	(Italy) Luca Marconi	Aprilia	16	Retirement	24	
Ret	50	(Norway) Sturla Fagerhaug	Aprilia	14	Retirement	31	
Ret	32	(Italy) Lorenzo Savadori	Aprilia	12	Accident	23	
Ret	79	(Italy) Giovanni Bonati	Aprilia	12	Accident	32	
Ret	5	(France) Alexis Masbou	Aprilia	8	Retirement	30	
Ret	39	(Spain) Luis Salom	Aprilia	7	Retirement	12	
Ret	63	(Malaysia) Zulfahmi Khairuddin	Aprilia	1	Retirement	20	
OFFICIAL 125CC REPORT

== Championship standings after the race (MotoGP) ==
Below are the standings for the top five riders and constructors after round twelve has concluded.

Riders' Championship standings

Pos.	Rider	Points
1	(Spain) Jorge Lorenzo	271
2	(Spain) Dani Pedrosa	208
3	(Italy) Andrea Dovizioso	139
4	(Italy) Valentino Rossi	130
5	(Australia) Casey Stoner	130

Constructors' Championship standings

Pos.	Constructor	Points
1	(Japan) Yamaha	280
2	(Japan) Honda	245
3	(Italy) Ducati	170
4	(Japan) Suzuki	64

- Note: Only the top five positions are included for both sets of standings.

Previous race: 2010 Indianapolis Grand Prix	FIM Grand Prix World Championship; 2010 season	Next race: 2010 Aragon Grand Prix
Previous race: 2009 San Marino Grand Prix	San Marino and Rimini Riviera motorcycle Grand Prix	Next race: 2011 San Marino Grand Prix
