= 2006 Czech Republic motorcycle Grand Prix =

2006 Czech Republic Grand Prix
Race details
- Race 12 of 17 races in the 2006 Grand Prix motorcycle racing season
- Date: 20 August 2006
- Official name: Gauloises Grand Prix České republiky
- Location: Brno Circuit
- Course: Permanent racing facility; 5.403 km (3.357 mi)

MotoGP
Pole position
- Rider: (Italy) Valentino Rossi
- Time: 1:56.191
Fastest lap
- Rider: (Italy) Loris Capirossi
- Time: 1:58.157
Podium
- First: (Italy) Loris Capirossi
- Second: (Italy) Valentino Rossi
- Third: (Spain) Dani Pedrosa

250cc
Pole position
- Rider: (Spain) Jorge Lorenzo
- Time: 2:02.292
Fastest lap
- Rider: (Italy) Andrea Dovizioso
- Time: 2:03.402
Podium
- First: (Spain) Jorge Lorenzo
- Second: (Italy) Andrea Dovizioso
- Third: (Japan) Hiroshi Aoyama

125cc
Pole position
- Rider: (Finland) Mika Kallio
- Time: 2:07.874
Fastest lap
- Rider: (Italy) Mattia Pasini
- Time: 2:08.114
Podium
- First: (Spain) Álvaro Bautista
- Second: (Finland) Mika Kallio
- Third: (Hungary) Gábor Talmácsi

The 2006 Czech Republic motorcycle Grand Prix was the twelfth round of the 2006 MotoGP Championship. It took place on the weekend of 18–20 August 2006 at the Brno Circuit located in Brno, Czech Republic.

This was the last European round to feature tobacco sponsorship, because tobacco companies sponsoring MotoGP rounds would be banned from the 2007 season onwards.

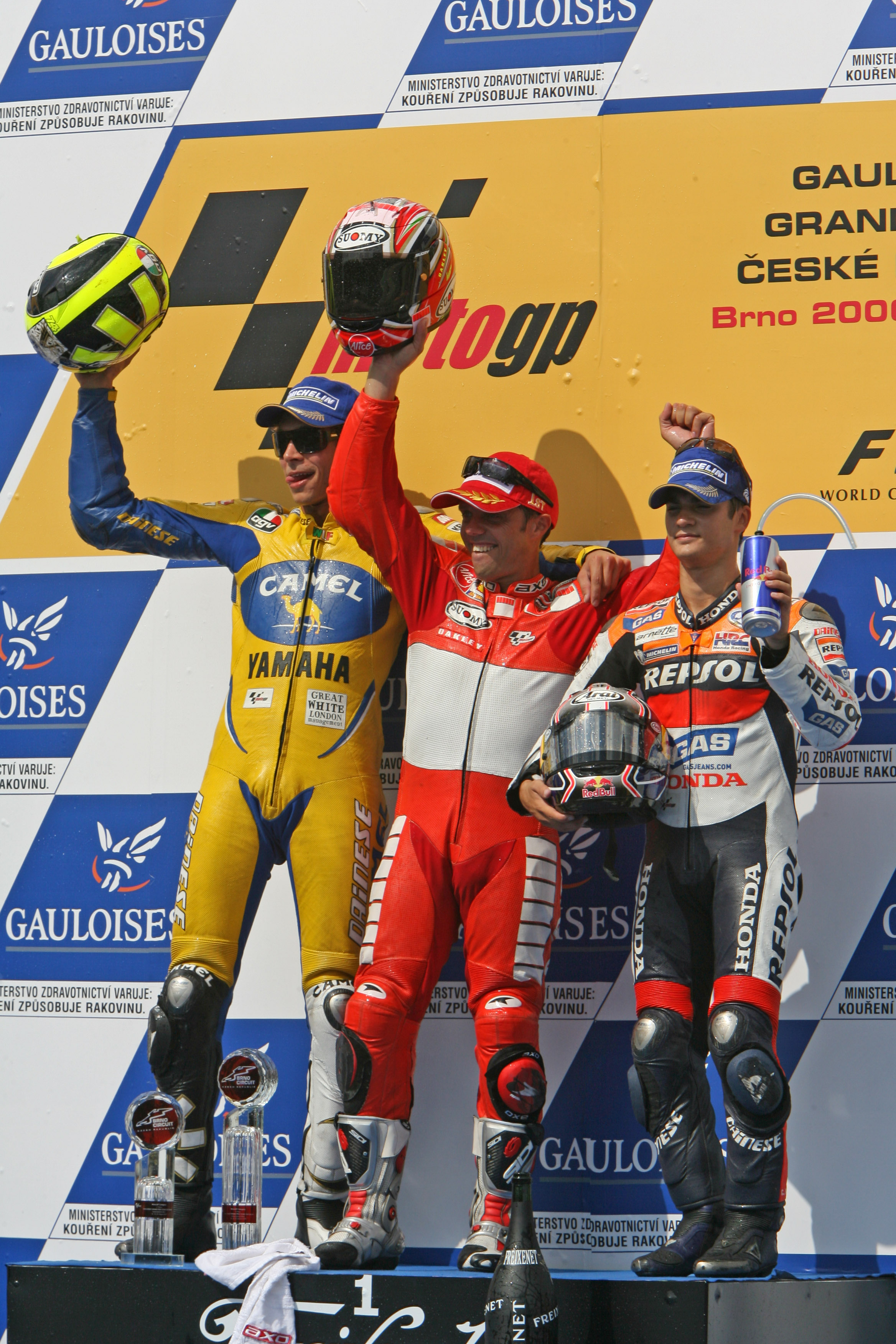
Valentino Rossi, Loris Capirossi and Dani Pedrosa, celebrating on the podium after finishing second, first and third at the MotoGP race.

== MotoGP classification ==
Pos.	No.	Rider	Team	Manufacturer	Laps	Time/Retired	Grid	Points
1	65	(Italy) Loris Capirossi	Ducati Marlboro Team	Ducati	22	43:40.145	2	25
2	46	(Italy) Valentino Rossi	Camel Yamaha Team	Yamaha	22	+4.902	1	20
3	26	(Spain) Dani Pedrosa	Repsol Honda Team	Honda	22	+8.012	9	16
4	10	(United States) Kenny Roberts Jr.	Team Roberts	KR211V	22	+14.800	3	13
5	33	(Italy) Marco Melandri	Fortuna Honda	Honda	22	+15.025	11	11
6	27	(Australia) Casey Stoner	Honda LCR	Honda	22	+15.699	12	10
7	21	(United States) John Hopkins	Rizla Suzuki MotoGP	Suzuki	22	+16.775	7	9
8	56	(Japan) Shinya Nakano	Kawasaki Racing Team	Kawasaki	22	+16.942	5	8
9	69	(United States) Nicky Hayden	Repsol Honda Team	Honda	22	+17.061	4	7
10	5	(United States) Colin Edwards	Camel Yamaha Team	Yamaha	22	+19.435	8	6
11	24	(Spain) Toni Elías	Fortuna Honda	Honda	22	+22.215	6	5
12	71	(Australia) Chris Vermeulen	Rizla Suzuki MotoGP	Suzuki	22	+23.978	13	4
13	6	(Japan) Makoto Tamada	Konica Minolta Honda	Honda	22	+24.967	15	3
14	17	(France) Randy de Puniet	Kawasaki Racing Team	Kawasaki	22	+28.961	10	2
15	7	(Spain) Carlos Checa	Tech 3 Yamaha	Yamaha	22	+29.296	17	1
16	66	(Germany) Alex Hofmann	Ducati Marlboro Team	Ducati	22	+29.801	14	
17	77	(United Kingdom) James Ellison	Tech 3 Yamaha	Yamaha	22	+1:02.982	16	
18	22	(Spain) Iván Silva	Pramac d'Antin MotoGP	Ducati	22	+1:44.775	19	
Ret	30	(Spain) José Luis Cardoso	Pramac d'Antin MotoGP	Ducati	6	Retirement	18	

== 250cc classification ==
Pos.	No.	Rider	Manufacturer	Laps	Time/Retired	Grid	Points
1	48	(Spain) Jorge Lorenzo	Aprilia	20	41:29.204	1	25
2	34	(Italy) Andrea Dovizioso	Honda	20	+2.507	2	20
3	4	(Japan) Hiroshi Aoyama	KTM	20	+2.524	3	16
4	15	(Italy) Roberto Locatelli	Aprilia	20	+15.294	7	13
5	80	(Spain) Héctor Barberá	Aprilia	20	+30.098	4	11
6	73	(Japan) Shuhei Aoyama	Honda	20	+30.223	6	10
7	36	(Colombia) Martín Cárdenas	Honda	20	+39.405	11	9
8	50	(France) Sylvain Guintoli	Aprilia	20	+43.800	14	8
9	58	(Italy) Marco Simoncelli	Gilera	20	+51.756	13	7
10	96	(Czech Republic) Jakub Smrž	Aprilia	20	+51.815	8	6
11	28	(Germany) Dirk Heidolf	Aprilia	20	+53.972	15	5
12	6	(Spain) Alex Debón	Aprilia	20	+1:01.584	10	4
13	8	(Italy) Andrea Ballerini	Aprilia	20	+1:03.693	16	3
14	21	(France) Arnaud Vincent	Honda	20	+1:16.241	20	2
15	23	(Spain) Arturo Tizón	Honda	20	+1:16.372	21	1
16	37	(Argentina) Fabricio Perren	Honda	20	+1:19.692	19	
17	44	(Japan) Taro Sekiguchi	Aprilia	20	+1:52.145	23	
18	24	(Spain) Jordi Carchano	Aprilia	20	+1:52.385	22	
19	84	(Denmark) Kenni Aggerholm	Yamaha	19	+1 lap	25	
Ret	14	(Australia) Anthony West	Aprilia	13	Retirement	18	
Ret	45	(United Kingdom) Dan Linfoot	Honda	8	Accident	26	
Ret	82	(Czech Republic) Michal Filla	Yamaha	8	Accident	24	
Ret	42	(Spain) Aleix Espargaró	Honda	7	Accident	9	
Ret	7	(San Marino) Alex de Angelis	Aprilia	4	Accident	5	
Ret	54	(San Marino) Manuel Poggiali	KTM	1	Retirement	12	
Ret	16	(France) Jules Cluzel	Aprilia	0	Accident	17	
DNS	22	(Italy) Luca Morelli	Aprilia		Did not start		
DNQ	85	(Italy) Alessio Palumbo	Aprilia		Did not qualify		
DNQ	75	(United Kingdom) Luke Lawrence	Yamaha		Did not qualify		
DNQ	83	(Czech Republic) Jiří Mayer	Honda		Did not qualify		
WD	25	(Italy) Alex Baldolini	Aprilia		Withdrew		

== 125cc classification ==
Pos.	No.	Rider	Manufacturer	Laps	Time/Retired	Grid	Points
1	19	(Spain) Álvaro Bautista	Aprilia	19	41:00.673	2	25
2	36	(Finland) Mika Kallio	KTM	19	+0.028	1	20
3	14	(Hungary) Gábor Talmácsi	Honda	19	+11.409	9	16
4	33	(Spain) Sergio Gadea	Aprilia	19	+11.843	7	13
5	1	(Switzerland) Thomas Lüthi	Honda	19	+12.155	15	11
6	75	(Italy) Mattia Pasini	Aprilia	19	+12.263	5	10
7	18	(Spain) Nicolás Terol	Derbi	19	+14.750	6	9
8	6	(Spain) Joan Olivé	Aprilia	19	+14.792	11	8
9	22	(Spain) Pablo Nieto	Aprilia	19	+15.722	12	7
10	32	(Italy) Fabrizio Lai	Honda	19	+35.170	10	6
11	11	(Germany) Sandro Cortese	Honda	19	+40.494	16	5
12	17	(Germany) Stefan Bradl	KTM	19	+40.544	14	4
13	63	(France) Mike Di Meglio	Honda	19	+41.465	25	3
14	43	(Spain) Manuel Hernández	Aprilia	19	+49.529	23	2
15	24	(Italy) Simone Corsi	Gilera	19	+51.402	26	1
16	71	(Japan) Tomoyoshi Koyama	Malaguti	19	+51.703	20	
17	10	(Spain) Ángel Rodríguez	Aprilia	19	+52.595	28	
18	9	(Austria) Michael Ranseder	KTM	19	+58.075	24	
19	15	(Italy) Michele Pirro	Aprilia	19	+58.109	17	
20	45	(Hungary) Imre Tóth	Aprilia	19	+1:08.139	21	
21	21	(Spain) Mateo Túnez	Aprilia	19	+1:11.341	31	
22	20	(Italy) Roberto Tamburini	Aprilia	19	+1:11.409	30	
23	7	(France) Alexis Masbou	Malaguti	19	+1:11.432	27	
24	78	(Netherlands) Hugo van den Berg	Aprilia	19	+1:16.663	38	
25	37	(Netherlands) Joey Litjens	Honda	19	+1:17.052	36	
26	16	(Italy) Michele Conti	Honda	19	+1:18.796	35	
27	81	(Romania) Robert Mureșan	Aprilia	19	+1:33.558	32	
28	13	(Italy) Dino Lombardi	Aprilia	19	+1:34.101	39	
29	53	(Italy) Simone Grotzkyj	Aprilia	19	+1:37.125	40	
30	68	(Germany) Thomas Mayer	Aprilia	19	+1:42.725	41	
31	69	(Czech Republic) Michal Šembera	Honda	19	+1:44.337	34	
32	70	(Czech Republic) Michal Prášek	Honda	19	+2:10.491	42	
33	56	(Italy) Stefano Musco	Honda	18	+1 lap	43	
Ret	52	(Czech Republic) Lukáš Pešek	Derbi	18	Accident	3	
Ret	55	(Spain) Héctor Faubel	Aprilia	18	Accident	4	
Ret	12	(Italy) Federico Sandi	Aprilia	18	Retirement	33	
Ret	35	(Italy) Raffaele De Rosa	Aprilia	13	Retirement	13	
Ret	34	(Spain) Esteve Rabat	Honda	10	Retirement	22	
Ret	8	(Italy) Lorenzo Zanetti	Aprilia	7	Retirement	19	
Ret	42	(Spain) Pol Espargaró	Derbi	6	Accident	29	
Ret	44	(Czech Republic) Karel Abraham	Aprilia	4	Retirement	18	
Ret	60	(Spain) Julián Simón	KTM	3	Accident	8	
Ret	26	(Switzerland) Vincent Braillard	Aprilia	0	Accident	37	
DNS	38	(United Kingdom) Bradley Smith	Honda		Did not start		

== Championship standings after the race (MotoGP) ==
Below are the standings for the top five riders and constructors after round twelve has concluded.

Riders' Championship standings

Pos.	Rider	Points
1	(United States) Nicky Hayden	201
2	(Spain) Dani Pedrosa	176
3	(Italy) Valentino Rossi	163
4	(Italy) Marco Melandri	161
5	(Italy) Loris Capirossi	151

Constructors' Championship standings

Pos.	Constructor	Points
1	(Japan) Honda	262
2	(Japan) Yamaha	201
3	(Italy) Ducati	160
4	(Japan) Suzuki	101
5	(United States) KR211V	92

- Note: Only the top five positions are included for both sets of standings.

Previous race: 2006 United States Grand Prix	FIM Grand Prix World Championship; 2006 season	Next race: 2006 Malaysian Grand Prix
Previous race: 2005 Czech Republic Grand Prix	Czech Republic motorcycle Grand Prix	Next race: 2007 Czech Republic Grand Prix
