= Michal Prášek =

Czech motorcycle racer

- Nationality: Czech
- Born: 6 December 1988 (age 37); Havlíčkův Brod, Czechoslovakia
- Current team: Roháč & Fejta Motoracing Team
- Bike number: 6
- Website: prasekmichal.com
Motorcycle racing career statistics
Superbike World Championship
Active years	2022
Manufacturers	BMW
Championships	0
2022 championship position	NC (0 pts)
Starts / Wins / Podiums / Poles / F. laps / Points; 2 / 0 / 0 / 0 / 0 / 0

Michal Prášek (born 6 December 1988) is a Grand Prix motorcycle racer from Czech Republic. He has competed compete aboard a BMW S1000RR in the Alpe Adria Road Race Superstock 1000 Championship. He is a three-time Alpe Adria Road Race Superstock 1000 Champion, winning it in 2015, 2016, and 2017.

== Career statistics ==
=== By season ===
Season	Class	Motorcycle	Team	Number	Race	Win	Podium	Pole	FLap	Pts	Plcd
2006	125cc	Honda	Roha'c & Fetja	97	1	0	0	0	0	0	NC
2007	125cc	Honda	Rohac&Fetja	93	1	0	0	0	0	0	NC
2008	125cc	Aprilia	Roha'c & Fetja Motoracing	97	1	0	0	0	0	0	NC
Total					**3**	**0**	**0**	**0**	**0**	**0**	

=== Races by year ===
Year	Class	Bike	1	2	3	4	5	6	7	8	9	10	11	12	13	14	15	16	17	Pos	Points
2006	125cc	Honda	SPA	QAT	TUR	CHN	FRA	ITA	CAT	NED	GBR	GER	CZE; 32	MAL	AUS	JPN	POR	VAL		NC	0
2007	125cc	Honda	QAT	SPA	TUR	CHN	FRA	ITA	CAT	GBR	NED	GER	CZE; Ret	RSM	POR	JPN	AUS	MAL	VAL	NC	0
2008	125cc	Aprilia	QAT	SPA	POR	CHN	FRA	ITA	CAT	GBR	NED	GER	CZE; 30	RSM	INP	JPN	AUS	MAL	VAL	NC	0

=== Superbike World Championship ===
==== Races by year ====
(key) (Races in bold indicate pole position) (Races in italics indicate fastest lap)

Year	Bike	1			2			3			4			5			6			7			8			9			10			11			12			Pos	Pts
Year	Bike	R1	SR	R2	R1	SR	R2	R1	SR	R2	R1	SR	R2	R1	SR	R2	R1	SR	R2	R1	SR	R2	R1	SR	R2	R1	SR	R2	R1	SR	R2	R1	SR	R2	R1	SR	R2	Pos	Pts
2022	Yamaha	SPA	SPA	SPA	NED	NED	NED	POR	POR	POR	ITA	ITA	ITA	GBR	GBR	GBR	CZE; Ret	CZE; 21	CZE; DNS	FRA	FRA	FRA	SPA	SPA	SPA	POR	POR	POR	ARG	ARG	ARG	INA	INA	INA	AUS	AUS	AUS	NC	0

^{*} Season still in progress.
