= 2022 Superbike World Championship =

Modified motorcycle racing championship

2022 Superbike World Championship
Previous:	2021	Next:	2023
Support series: Supersport World Championship; Supersport 300 World Championship; Yamaha R3 bLU cRU World Cup

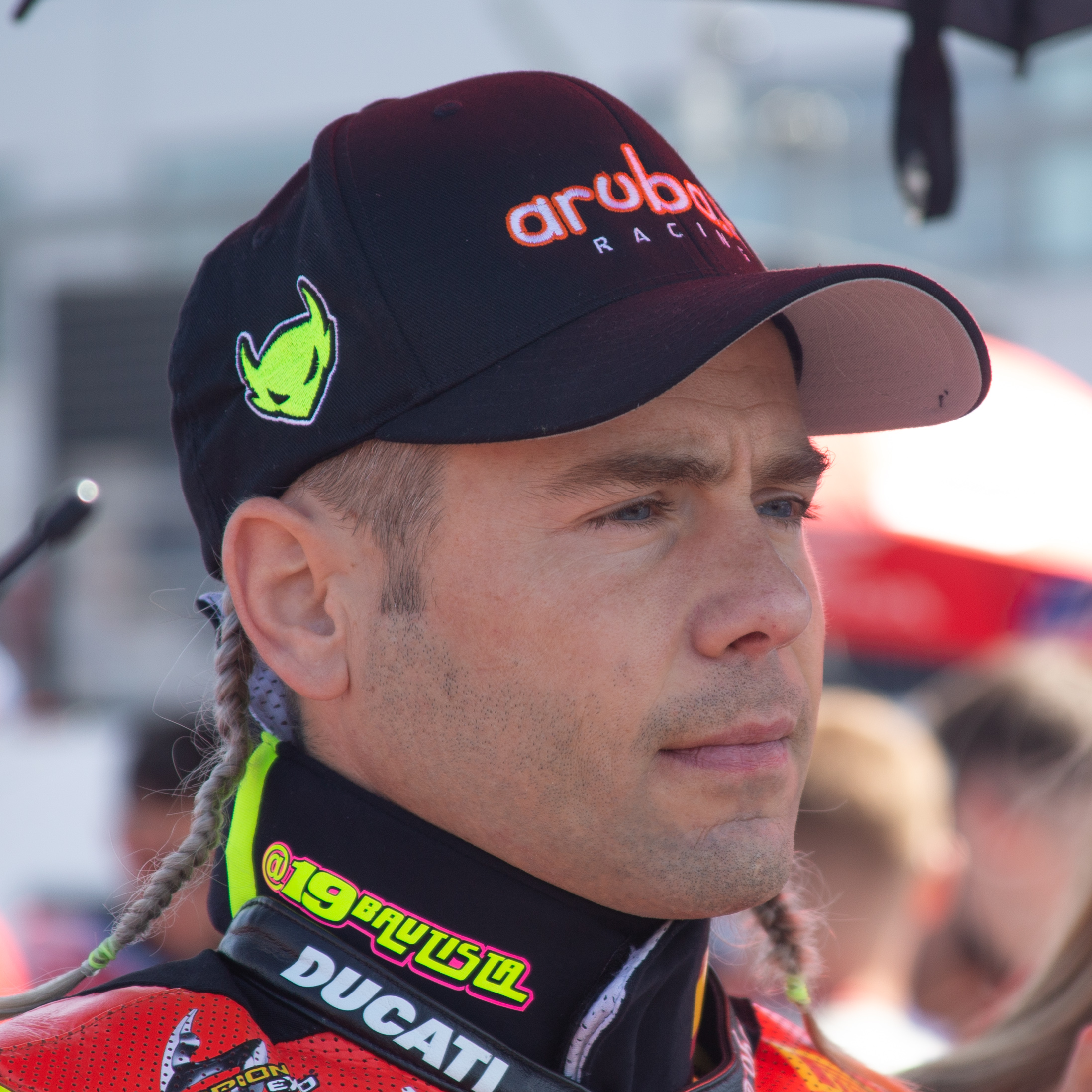
Álvaro Bautista was the 2022 Superbike Champion.

The 2022 Superbike World Championship was the 35th season of the Superbike World Championship. The championship was won by Álvaro Bautista, who became World Champion in 2022 after finishing 2nd in Race 2 at the Mandalika round. There are 24 riders who compete in this event for the Mandalika race. Ducati won its 18th manufacturer title.

== Race calendar and results ==
The provisional 2022 season calendar was announced on 25 November 2021. On 30 July 2022, Ducati achieved the 1000th podium in Superbike World Championship.

2022 Superbike World Championship Calendar
Round			Circuit	Date	Superpole	Fastest lap	Winning rider	Winning team	Winning constructor	Ref
1	R1	(Spain) Aragón	MotorLand Aragón	9 April	(Turkey) Toprak Razgatlıoğlu	(Turkey) Toprak Razgatlıoğlu	(United Kingdom) Jonathan Rea	Kawasaki Racing Team WorldSBK	(Japan) Kawasaki	
1	SR	(Spain) Aragón	MotorLand Aragón	10 April	(Turkey) Toprak Razgatlıoğlu	(Turkey) Toprak Razgatlıoğlu	(Spain) Álvaro Bautista	Aruba.it Racing – Ducati	(Italy) Ducati	
1	R2	(Spain) Aragón	MotorLand Aragón	10 April		(United Kingdom) Alex Lowes	(Spain) Álvaro Bautista	Aruba.it Racing – Ducati	(Italy) Ducati	
2	R1	(Netherlands) Dutch	TT Circuit Assen	23 April	(Turkey) Toprak Razgatlıoğlu	(United Kingdom) Jonathan Rea	(United Kingdom) Jonathan Rea	Kawasaki Racing Team WorldSBK	(Japan) Kawasaki	
2	SR	(Netherlands) Dutch	TT Circuit Assen	24 April	(Turkey) Toprak Razgatlıoğlu	(Spain) Álvaro Bautista	(United Kingdom) Jonathan Rea	Kawasaki Racing Team WorldSBK	(Japan) Kawasaki	
2	R2	(Netherlands) Dutch	TT Circuit Assen	24 April		(United Kingdom) Jonathan Rea	(Spain) Álvaro Bautista	Aruba.it Racing – Ducati	(Italy) Ducati	
3	R1	(Portugal) Estoril	Circuito do Estoril	21 May	(United Kingdom) Jonathan Rea	(United Kingdom) Jonathan Rea	(Spain) Álvaro Bautista	Aruba.it Racing – Ducati	(Italy) Ducati	
3	SR	(Portugal) Estoril	Circuito do Estoril	22 May	(United Kingdom) Jonathan Rea	(United Kingdom) Jonathan Rea	(United Kingdom) Jonathan Rea	Kawasaki Racing Team WorldSBK	(Japan) Kawasaki	
3	R2	(Portugal) Estoril	Circuito do Estoril	22 May		(United Kingdom) Jonathan Rea	(United Kingdom) Jonathan Rea	Kawasaki Racing Team WorldSBK	(Japan) Kawasaki	
4	R1	(Italy) Emilia-Romagna	Misano World Circuit Marco Simoncelli	11 June	(Spain) Álvaro Bautista	(Spain) Álvaro Bautista	(Spain) Álvaro Bautista	Aruba.it Racing – Ducati	(Italy) Ducati	
4	SR	(Italy) Emilia-Romagna	Misano World Circuit Marco Simoncelli	12 June	(Spain) Álvaro Bautista	(Turkey) Toprak Razgatlıoğlu	(Turkey) Toprak Razgatlıoğlu	Pata Yamaha with Brixx WorldSBK	(Japan) Yamaha	
4	R2	(Italy) Emilia-Romagna	Misano World Circuit Marco Simoncelli	12 June		(Spain) Álvaro Bautista	(Spain) Álvaro Bautista	Aruba.it Racing – Ducati	(Italy) Ducati	
5	R1	(United Kingdom) UK	Donington Park	16 July	(United Kingdom) Jonathan Rea	(United Kingdom) Jonathan Rea	(Turkey) Toprak Razgatlıoğlu	Pata Yamaha with Brixx WorldSBK	(Japan) Yamaha	
5	SR	(United Kingdom) UK	Donington Park	17 July	(United Kingdom) Jonathan Rea	(Turkey) Toprak Razgatlıoğlu	(Turkey) Toprak Razgatlıoğlu	Pata Yamaha with Brixx WorldSBK	(Japan) Yamaha	
5	R2	(United Kingdom) UK	Donington Park	17 July		(Spain) Álvaro Bautista	(Turkey) Toprak Razgatlıoğlu	Pata Yamaha with Brixx WorldSBK	(Japan) Yamaha	
6	R1	(Czech Republic) Czech	Autodrom Most	30 July	(United Kingdom) Jonathan Rea	(Turkey) Toprak Razgatlıoğlu	(Spain) Álvaro Bautista	Aruba.it Racing – Ducati	(Italy) Ducati	
6	SR	(Czech Republic) Czech	Autodrom Most	31 July	(United Kingdom) Jonathan Rea	(Turkey) Toprak Razgatlıoğlu	(Turkey) Toprak Razgatlıoğlu	Pata Yamaha with Brixx WorldSBK	(Japan) Yamaha	
6	R2	(Czech Republic) Czech	Autodrom Most	31 July		(Turkey) Toprak Razgatlıoğlu	(Turkey) Toprak Razgatlıoğlu	Pata Yamaha with Brixx WorldSBK	(Japan) Yamaha	
7	R1	(France) French	Circuit de Nevers Magny-Cours	10 September	(United Kingdom) Jonathan Rea	(Spain) Álvaro Bautista	(Spain) Álvaro Bautista	Aruba.it Racing – Ducati	(Italy) Ducati	
7	SR	(France) French	Circuit de Nevers Magny-Cours	11 September	(United Kingdom) Jonathan Rea	(Spain) Álvaro Bautista	(Turkey) Toprak Razgatlıoğlu	Pata Yamaha with Brixx WorldSBK	(Japan) Yamaha	
7	R2	(France) French	Circuit de Nevers Magny-Cours	11 September		(Turkey) Toprak Razgatlıoğlu	(Turkey) Toprak Razgatlıoğlu	Pata Yamaha with Brixx WorldSBK	(Japan) Yamaha	
8	R1	(Spain) Catalunya	Circuit de Barcelona-Catalunya	24 September	(Spain) Iker Lecuona	(Spain) Álvaro Bautista	(Spain) Álvaro Bautista	Aruba.it Racing – Ducati	(Italy) Ducati	
8	SR	(Spain) Catalunya	Circuit de Barcelona-Catalunya	25 September	(Spain) Iker Lecuona	(Spain) Álvaro Bautista	(Spain) Álvaro Bautista	Aruba.it Racing – Ducati	(Italy) Ducati	
8	R2	(Spain) Catalunya	Circuit de Barcelona-Catalunya	25 September		(Spain) Álvaro Bautista	(Spain) Álvaro Bautista	Aruba.it Racing – Ducati	(Italy) Ducati	
9	R1	(Portugal) Portuguese	Algarve International Circuit	8 October	(United Kingdom) Jonathan Rea	(Turkey) Toprak Razgatlıoğlu	(Turkey) Toprak Razgatlıoğlu	Pata Yamaha with Brixx WorldSBK	(Japan) Yamaha	
9	SR	(Portugal) Portuguese	Algarve International Circuit	9 October	(United Kingdom) Jonathan Rea	(United Kingdom) Jonathan Rea	(Turkey) Toprak Razgatlıoğlu	Pata Yamaha with Brixx WorldSBK	(Japan) Yamaha	
9	R2	(Portugal) Portuguese	Algarve International Circuit	9 October		(Turkey) Toprak Razgatlıoğlu	(Spain) Álvaro Bautista	Aruba.it Racing – Ducati	(Italy) Ducati	
10	R1	(Argentina) Argentinean	Circuito San Juan Villicum	22 October	(Turkey) Toprak Razgatlıoğlu	(Spain) Álvaro Bautista	(Spain) Álvaro Bautista	Aruba.it Racing – Ducati	(Italy) Ducati	
10	SR	(Argentina) Argentinean	Circuito San Juan Villicum	23 October	(Turkey) Toprak Razgatlıoğlu	(United Kingdom) Jonathan Rea	(Turkey) Toprak Razgatlıoğlu	Pata Yamaha with Brixx WorldSBK	(Japan) Yamaha	
10	R2	(Argentina) Argentinean	Circuito San Juan Villicum	23 October		(Spain) Álvaro Bautista	(Spain) Álvaro Bautista	Aruba.it Racing – Ducati	(Italy) Ducati	
11	R1	(Indonesia) Indonesian	Pertamina Mandalika International Street Circuit	12 November	(Turkey) Toprak Razgatlıoğlu	(Turkey) Toprak Razgatlıoğlu	(Turkey) Toprak Razgatlıoğlu	Pata Yamaha with Brixx WorldSBK	(Japan) Yamaha	
11	SR	(Indonesia) Indonesian	Pertamina Mandalika International Street Circuit	13 November	(Turkey) Toprak Razgatlıoğlu	(Turkey) Toprak Razgatlıoğlu	(Turkey) Toprak Razgatlıoğlu	Pata Yamaha with Brixx WorldSBK	(Japan) Yamaha	
11	R2	(Indonesia) Indonesian	Pertamina Mandalika International Street Circuit	13 November		(Turkey) Toprak Razgatlıoğlu	(Turkey) Toprak Razgatlıoğlu	Pata Yamaha with Brixx WorldSBK	(Japan) Yamaha	
12	R1	(Australia) Australian	Phillip Island Grand Prix Circuit	19 November	(Spain) Álvaro Bautista	(United Kingdom) Alex Lowes	(United Kingdom) Jonathan Rea	Kawasaki Racing Team WorldSBK	(Japan) Kawasaki	
12	SR	(Australia) Australian	Phillip Island Grand Prix Circuit	20 November	(Spain) Álvaro Bautista	(Spain) Álvaro Bautista	(Spain) Álvaro Bautista	Aruba.it Racing – Ducati	(Italy) Ducati	
12	R2	(Australia) Australian	Phillip Island Grand Prix Circuit	20 November		(Spain) Álvaro Bautista	(Spain) Álvaro Bautista	Aruba.it Racing – Ducati	(Italy) Ducati	

== Entry list ==
2022 entry list
Team	Constructor	Motorcycle	No.	Rider	Rounds
(Japan) Pata Yamaha with Brixx WorldSBK	Yamaha	YZF-R1	1	(Turkey) Toprak Razgatlıoğlu	All
(Japan) Pata Yamaha with Brixx WorldSBK	Yamaha	YZF-R1	55	(Italy) Andrea Locatelli	All
(Italy) Yamaha Motoxracing WorldSBK Team	Yamaha	YZF-R1	2	(Italy) Roberto Tamburini	1–2, 4–9
(Italy) Yamaha Motoxracing WorldSBK Team	Yamaha	YZF-R1	17	(Germany) Marvin Fritz	3
(Italy) GYTR GRT Yamaha WorldSBK Team	Yamaha	YZF-R1	3	(Japan) Kohta Nozane	All
(Italy) GYTR GRT Yamaha WorldSBK Team	Yamaha	YZF-R1	31	(United States) Garrett Gerloff	All
(Italy) Team GoEleven	Ducati	Panigale V4 R	5	(Germany) Philipp Öttl	All (Note: Philipp Öttl competed in the Friday practice sessions during round 3, before being replaced on Saturday by Xavi Forés.)
(Italy) Team GoEleven	Ducati	Panigale V4 R	12	(Spain) Xavi Forés	3
(Czech Republic) Roháč & Fejta Motoracing	BMW	M1000RR	6	(Czech Republic) Michal Prášek	6
(Japan) Team HRC	Honda	CBR1000RR-R	7	(Spain) Iker Lecuona	1–11
(Japan) Team HRC	Honda	CBR1000RR-R	49	(Japan) Tetsuta Nagashima	12
(Japan) Team HRC	Honda	CBR1000RR-R	97	(Spain) Xavi Vierge	All
(United Kingdom) FHO Racing	BMW	M1000RR	10	(United Kingdom) Peter Hickman	5
(Germany) BMW Motorrad WorldSBK Team	BMW	M1000RR	10	(United Kingdom) Peter Hickman	6
(Germany) BMW Motorrad WorldSBK Team	BMW	M1000RR	37	(Ukraine) Ilya Mykhalchyk	1, 4–5
(Germany) BMW Motorrad WorldSBK Team	BMW	M1000RR	45	(United Kingdom) Scott Redding	All
(Germany) BMW Motorrad WorldSBK Team	BMW	M1000RR	60	(Netherlands) Michael van der Mark	2–3, 7–12
(Italy) TPR Team Pedercini Racing	Kawasaki	Ninja ZX-10RR	11	(United Kingdom) Kyle Smith	11–12
(Italy) TPR Team Pedercini Racing	Kawasaki	Ninja ZX-10RR	25	(Italy) Alessandro Delbianco	4
(Italy) TPR Team Pedercini Racing	Kawasaki	Ninja ZX-10RR	32	(Spain) Isaac Viñales	3
(Italy) TPR Team Pedercini Racing	Kawasaki	Ninja ZX-10RR	39	(Argentina) Marco Solorza	10
(Italy) TPR Team Pedercini Racing	Kawasaki	Ninja ZX-10RR	77	(United Kingdom) Ryan Vickers	6
(Italy) TPR Team Pedercini Racing	Kawasaki	Ninja ZX-10RR	84	(Belgium) Loris Cresson	1
(Italy) TPR Team Pedercini Racing	Kawasaki	Ninja ZX-10RR	91	(United Kingdom) Leon Haslam	2, 5, 9
(Italy) TPR Team Pedercini Racing	Kawasaki	Ninja ZX-10RR	99	(Spain) Óscar Gutiérrez	7–8
(Italy) Barni Spark Racing Team	Ducati	Panigale V4 R	12	(Spain) Xavi Forés	10–12
(Italy) Barni Spark Racing Team	Ducati	Panigale V4 R	29	(San Marino) Luca Bernardi	1–9
(Italy) Bmax Racing	BMW	M1000RR	16	(Italy) Gabriele Ruiu	1–2, 4
(Austria) IXS – Yart – Yamaha	Yamaha	YZF-R1	17	(Germany) Marvin Fritz	9
(Italy) Aruba.it Racing – Ducati	Ducati	Panigale V4 R	19	(Spain) Álvaro Bautista	All
(Italy) Aruba.it Racing – Ducati	Ducati	Panigale V4 R	21	(Italy) Michael Ruben Rinaldi	All
(Japan) Kawasaki Racing Team WorldSBK	Kawasaki	Ninja ZX-10RR	22	(United Kingdom) Alex Lowes	All
(Japan) Kawasaki Racing Team WorldSBK	Kawasaki	Ninja ZX-10RR	65	(United Kingdom) Jonathan Rea	All
(France) Gil Motor Sport–Yamaha	Yamaha	YZF-R1	23	(France) Christophe Ponsson	1–9
(Japan) MIE Racing Honda Team	Honda	CBR1000RR-R	27	(Chile) Maximilian Scheib	10
(Japan) MIE Racing Honda Team	Honda	CBR1000RR-R	35	(Malaysia) Hafizh Syahrin	1–9, 11–12
(Japan) MIE Racing Honda Team	Honda	CBR1000RR-R	36	(Argentina) Leandro Mercado	All
(United States) Attack Performance Yamaha Racing	Yamaha	YZF-R1	33	(United States) Jake Gagne	9
(Italy) Kawasaki Puccetti Racing	Kawasaki	Ninja ZX-10RR	44	(France) Lucas Mahias	1–3, 5–12
(Italy) Kawasaki Puccetti Racing	Kawasaki	Ninja ZX-10RR	53	(Spain) Tito Rabat	4
(Italy) Motocorsa Racing	Ducati	Panigale V4 R	47	(Italy) Axel Bassani	All
(Germany) Bonovo Action BMW	BMW	M1000RR	50	(Republic of Ireland) Eugene Laverty	All
(Germany) Bonovo Action BMW	BMW	M1000RR	76	(France) Loris Baz	All
(Spain) Orelac Racing VerdNatura	Kawasaki	Ninja ZX-10RR	52	(Czech Republic) Oliver König	All
(United Kingdom) McAMS Yamaha	Yamaha	YZF-R1	95	(United Kingdom) Tarran Mackenzie	5

Key
Regular rider
Wildcard rider
Replacement rider

=== Rider changes ===
- Team HRC signed rookies Iker Lecuona and Xavi Vierge, replacing veteran riders Álvaro Bautista and Leon Haslam.
- Supersport rider Luca Bernardi was signed by Barni Racing.
- Scott Redding switched from Ducati to BMW, replaced by Álvaro Bautista.
- Bonovo Racing signed Eugene Laverty and Loris Baz, replacing Jonas Folger.
- Team GoEleven announced the signing of Philipp Öttl, who moved from the Supersport World Championship.
- Hafizh Syahrin switched from Moto2 to WorldSBK with MIE Honda Racing.
- Tarran Mackenzie (2021 British Superbike champion) was expecting to participate in three wildcard events at Assen, Donington Park, and a third circuit to be confirmed, riding a factory Yamaha instead of his usual McAMS British-specification superbike. Mackenzie was injured in BSB pre-season testing and did not participate in the first wildcard entry at Assen.
- Peter Hickman was announced as a wild card for the Donington Park event, riding his usual British Superbike BMW M1000RR, with suitable alterations including a World Superbike specification CPU.

== Championship standings ==
Points were awarded as follows:

Race 1 and Race 2

Position	**1st**	**2nd**	**3rd**	**4th**	**5th**	**6th**	**7th**	**8th**	**9th**	**10th**	**11th**	**12th**	**13th**	**14th**	**15th**
Points	25	20	16	13	11	10	9	8	7	6	5	4	3	2	1

Superpole Race

Position	**1st**	**2nd**	**3rd**	**4th**	**5th**	**6th**	**7th**	**8th**	**9th**
Points	12	9	7	6	5	4	3	2	1

=== Riders' championship ===
Pos.	Rider	Bike	ARA (Spain)			ASS (Netherlands)			EST (Portugal)			MIS (Italy)			DON (United Kingdom)			MOS (Czech Republic)			MAG (France)			BAR (Spain)			POR (Portugal)			VIL (Argentina)			MAN (Indonesia)			PHI (Australia)			Pts.
Pos.	Rider	Bike	R1	SR	R2	R1	SR	R2	R1	SR	R2	R1	SR	R2	R1	SR	R2	R1	SR	R2	R1	SR	R2	R1	SR	R2	R1	SR	R2	R1	SR	R2	R1	SR	R2	R1	SR	R2	Pts.
1	(Spain) Álvaro Bautista	Ducati	2	1	1	2	3	1	1	3	2	**1**	**2**	1	Ret	4	2	1	3	2	1	2	Ret	1	1	1	2	2	1	1	2	1	2	4	2	**5**	**1**	1	601
2	(Turkey) Toprak Razgatlıoğlu	Yamaha	**3**	**3**	3	**3**	**2**	Ret	2	2	3	Ret	1	2	1	1	1	2	1	1	11	1	1	5	4	3	1	1	2	**15**	**1**	2	**1**	**1**	1	2	2	4	529
3	(United Kingdom) Jonathan Rea	Kawasaki	1	2	2	1	1	Ret	**3**	**1**	1	2	3	4	**2**	**2**	3	**4**	**2**	3	**24**	**3**	5	2	2	4	**3**	**3**	3	2	3	3	3	2	3	1	3	2	502
4	(Italy) Michael Ruben Rinaldi	Ducati	4	4	4	Ret	8	7	9	8	8	3	10	3	6	6	4	7	4	Ret	6	7	2	4	5	2	7	5	4	5	4	5	5	8	10	11	22	7	293
5	(Italy) Andrea Locatelli	Yamaha	5	5	19	4	4	2	4	5	5	6	6	6	10	8	8	6	6	6	7	10	7	9	21	16	6	7	6	8	10	8	4	3	4	4	5	5	274
6	(United Kingdom) Alex Lowes	Kawasaki	Ret	6	5	Ret	Ret	4	7	6	4	5	8	8	3	5	6	9	Ret	DNS	4	4	4	7	3	Ret	5	4	5	6	5	4	9	7	9	3	4	3	272
7	(Italy) Axel Bassani	Ducati	16	7	6	10	9	6	12	10	7	4	7	7	5	12	7	5	5	5	3	6	3	8	16	5	4	6	Ret	3	7	20	8	5	5	7	13	11	244
8	(United Kingdom) Scott Redding	BMW	15	12	Ret	9	11	5	8	7	11	10	11	9	4	3	5	3	8	4	2	5	6	Ret	8	Ret	18	13	7	7	14	9	12	6	6	16	6	6	204
9	(Spain) Iker Lecuona	Honda	6	8	10	5	5	3	6	4	6	9	5	5	8	7	10	8	7	Ret	9	11	10	**6**	**Ret**	8	11	12	22	4	6	7	DNS	DNS	DNS				189
10	(Spain) Xavi Vierge	Honda	7	9	8	11	12	9	5	Ret	9	7	4	Ret	13	15	13	15	10	7	13	Ret	Ret	12	7	6	8	10	8	9	8	6	6	9	7	8	8	Ret	164
11	(United States) Garrett Gerloff	Yamaha	9	10	9	8	7	Ret	DNS	DNS	DNS	8	9	Ret	7	10	11	10	9	18	5	8	8	3	10	Ret	10	Ret	9	13	13	12	7	13	8	6	7	Ret	142
12	(France) Loris Baz	BMW	11	13	7	6	6	Ret	10	Ret	12	15	Ret	10	9	9	9	11	11	Ret	14	9	9	11	9	9	9	9	10	16	9	17	10	12	13	9	10	10	125
13	(Germany) Philipp Öttl	Ducati	13	16	13	7	10	Ret	WD	WD	WD	Ret	Ret	11	11	11	12	13	13	8	8	12	11	Ret	6	7	12	11	11	17	15	14	Ret	14	DNS	20	16	8	85
14	(France) Lucas Mahias	Kawasaki	14	14	11	15	13	10	17	Ret	DNS				12	14	14	12	12	9	10	14	12	14	11	12	13	14	Ret	11	18	15	DNS	DNS	DNS	14	11	13	61
15	(Netherlands) Michael van der Mark	BMW				13	15	8	WD	WD	WD										12	13	Ret	Ret	Ret	13	14	8	12	10	11	10	Ret	10	12	Ret	21	12	46
16	(Republic of Ireland) Eugene Laverty	BMW	10	11	12	DNS	DNS	DNS	15	Ret	14	13	12	14	20	23	Ret	19	18	DNS	18	18	Ret	10	14	14	15	15	16	14	19	11	14	17	16	18	15	Ret	36
17	(Italy) Roberto Tamburini	Yamaha	17	15	14	14	16	11				11	17	12	21	21	21	21	20	11	19	19	14	13	15	10	16	Ret	14										36
18	(San Marino) Luca Bernardi	Ducati	12	17	16	18	20	14	13	15	15	14	14	13	18	22	16	14	14	10	15	15	13	Ret	12	11	17	18	13										35
19	(Spain) Xavi Forés	Ducati							11	9	10																			12	12	13	11	11	11	13	9	Ret	33
20	(Japan) Kohta Nozane	Yamaha	18	18	Ret	17	14	Ret	14	11	13	12	Ret	16	19	17	18	18	16	13	17	16	15	16	13	15	20	20	21	18	16	16	15	20	Ret	Ret	17	16	15
21	(Japan) Tetsuta Nagashima	Honda																																		10	19	9	13
22	(Ukraine) Ilya Mykhalchyk	BMW	8	Ret	15							18	15	15	16	18	Ret																						10
23	(Malaysia) Hafizh Syahrin	Honda	21	22	20	20	22	17	19	16	19	17	13	Ret	17	19	20	Ret	15	12	20	17	19	WD	WD	WD	Ret	23	19				13	15	14	15	12	17	10
24	(France) Christophe Ponsson	Yamaha	19	21	18	12	19	12	18	12	16	Ret	DNS	DNS	Ret	DNS	DNS	20	Ret	Ret	16	21	16	15	17	Ret	22	22	18										9
25	(United Kingdom) Kyle Smith	Kawasaki																															Ret	19	Ret	12	18	18	4
26	(United Kingdom) Leon Haslam	Kawasaki				16	17	13							15	13	Ret										Ret	19	Ret										4
27	(Czech Republic) Oliver König	Kawasaki	22	23	22	21	23	18	20	17	20	20	20	19	23	24	22	16	Ret	16	22	23	18	19	20	18	24	24	23	19	20	18	16	18	15	19	20	14	3
28	(United Kingdom) Tarran Mackenzie	Yamaha													14	Ret	15																						3
29	(Argentina) Leandro Mercado	Honda	20	20	21	19	18	15	Ret	14	18	19	19	18	Ret	20	17	17	17	15	21	20	Ret	18	19	17	23	21	20	Ret	17	19	Ret	16	17	17	14	15	3
30	(United Kingdom) Peter Hickman	BMW													22	16	19	22	19	14																			2
31	(United States) Jake Gagne	Yamaha																									19	16	15										1
	(Spain) Isaac Viñales	Kawasaki							21	13	Ret																												0
	(Spain) Tito Rabat	Kawasaki										16	16	17																									0
	(Germany) Marvin Fritz	Yamaha							16	Ret	17																21	17	17										0
	(Italy) Gabriele Ruiu	BMW	Ret	19	17	Ret	21	16				Ret	18	Ret																									0
	(Spain) Óscar Gutiérrez	Kawasaki																			23	22	17	17	18	Ret													0
	(United Kingdom) Ryan Vickers	Kawasaki																23	Ret	17																			0
	(Chile) Maximilian Scheib	Honda																												20	21	21							0
	(Argentina) Marco Solorza	Kawasaki																												21	22	22							0
	(Czech Republic) Michal Prášek	BMW																Ret	21	DNS																			0
	(Belgium) Loris Cresson	Kawasaki	23	24	23																																		0
	(Italy) Alessandro Delbianco	Kawasaki										Ret	Ret	Ret																									0
Pos.	Rider	Bike	ARA (Spain)			ASS (Netherlands)			EST (Portugal)			MIS (Italy)			DON (United Kingdom)			MOS (Czech Republic)			MAG (France)			BAR (Spain)			POR (Portugal)			VIL (Argentina)			MAN (Indonesia)			PHI (Australia)			Pts.

Colour	Result
Gold	Winner
Silver	Second place
Bronze	Third place
Green	Points classification
Blue	Non-points classification
Blue	Non-classified finish (NC)
Purple	Retired, not classified (Ret)
Red	Did not qualify (DNQ)
Red	Did not pre-qualify (DNPQ)
Black	Disqualified (DSQ)
White	Did not start (DNS)
White	Withdrew (WD)
White	Race cancelled (C)
Blank	Did not practice (DNP)
Blank	Did not arrive (DNA)
Blank	Excluded (EX)

**Bold** – Pole position
Italics – Fastest lap

=== Teams' championship ===
Pos.	Team	Bike No.	ARA (Spain)			ASS (Netherlands)			EST (Portugal)			MIS (Italy)			DON (United Kingdom)			MOS (Czech Republic)			MAG (France)			BAR (Spain)			POR (Portugal)			VIL (Argentina)			MAN (Indonesia)			PHI (Australia)			Pts.
Pos.	Team	Bike No.	R1	SR	R2	R1	SR	R2	R1	SR	R2	R1	SR	R2	R1	SR	R2	R1	SR	R2	R1	SR	R2	R1	SR	R2	R1	SR	R2	R1	SR	R2	R1	SR	R2	R1	SR	R2	Pts.
1	Aruba.it Racing – Ducati	19	2	1	1	2	3	1	1	3	2	**1**	**2**	1	Ret	4	2	1	3	2	1	2	Ret	1	1	1	2	2	1	1	2	1	2	4	2	**5**	**1**	1	894
1	Aruba.it Racing – Ducati	21	4	4	4	Ret	8	7	9	8	8	3	10	3	6	6	4	7	4	Ret	6	7	2	4	5	2	7	5	4	5	4	5	5	8	10	11	22	7	894
2	Pata Yamaha with Brixx WorldSBK	1	**3**	**3**	3	**3**	**2**	Ret	2	2	3	Ret	1	2	1	1	1	2	1	1	11	1	1	5	4	3	1	1	2	**15**	**1**	2	**1**	**1**	1	2	2	4	803
2	Pata Yamaha with Brixx WorldSBK	55	5	5	19	4	4	2	4	5	5	6	6	6	10	8	8	6	6	6	7	10	7	9	21	16	6	7	6	8	10	8	4	3	4	4	5	5	803
3	Kawasaki Racing Team WorldSBK	22	Ret	6	5	Ret	Ret	4	7	6	4	5	8	8	3	5	6	9	Ret	DNS	4	4	4	7	3	Ret	5	4	5	6	5	4	9	7	9	3	4	3	774
3	Kawasaki Racing Team WorldSBK	65	1	2	2	1	1	Ret	**3**	**1**	1	2	3	4	**2**	**2**	3	**4**	**2**	3	**24**	**3**	5	2	2	4	**3**	**3**	3	2	3	3	3	2	3	1	3	2	774
4	Team HRC	7	6	8	10	5	5	3	6	4	6	9	5	5	8	7	10	8	7	Ret	9	11	10	**6**	**Ret**	8	11	12	22	4	6	7	DNS	DNS	DNS				366
4	Team HRC	49																																		10	19	9	366
4	Team HRC	97	7	9	8	11	12	9	5	Ret	9	7	4	Ret	13	15	13	15	10	7	13	Ret	Ret	12	7	6	8	10	8	9	8	6	6	9	7	8	8	Ret	366
5	BMW Motorrad WorldSBK Team	10																22	19	14																			262
5	BMW Motorrad WorldSBK Team	37	8	Ret	15							18	15	15	16	18	Ret																						262
5	BMW Motorrad WorldSBK Team	45	15	12	Ret	9	11	5	8	7	11	10	11	9	4	3	5	3	8	4	2	5	6	Ret	8	Ret	18	13	7	7	14	9	12	6	6	16	6	6	262
5	BMW Motorrad WorldSBK Team	60				13	15	8	WD	WD	WD										12	13	Ret	Ret	Ret	13	14	8	12	10	11	10	Ret	10	12	Ret	21	12	262
6	Motocorsa Racing	47	16	7	6	10	9	6	12	10	7	4	7	7	5	12	7	5	5	5	3	6	3	8	16	5	4	6	Ret	3	7	20	8	5	5	7	13	11	244
7	Bonovo Action BMW	50	10	11	12	DNS	DNS	DNS	15	Ret	14	13	12	14	20	23	Ret	19	18	DNS	18	18	Ret	10	14	14	15	15	16	14	19	11	14	17	16	18	15	Ret	161
7	Bonovo Action BMW	76	11	13	7	6	6	Ret	10	Ret	12	15	Ret	10	9	9	9	11	11	Ret	14	9	9	11	9	9	9	9	10	16	9	17	10	12	13	9	10	10	161
8	GYTR GRT Yamaha WorldSBK Team	3	18	18	Ret	17	14	Ret	14	11	13	12	Ret	16	19	17	18	18	16	13	17	16	15	16	13	15	20	20	21	18	16	16	15	20	Ret	Ret	17	16	157
8	GYTR GRT Yamaha WorldSBK Team	31	9	10	9	8	7	Ret	DNS	DNS	DNS	8	9	Ret	7	10	11	10	9	18	5	8	8	3	10	Ret	10	Ret	9	13	13	12	7	13	8	6	7	Ret	157
9	Team Goeleven	5	13	16	13	7	10	Ret	WD	WD	WD	Ret	Ret	11	11	11	12	13	13	8	8	12	11	Ret	6	7	12	11	11	17	15	14	Ret	14	DNS	20	16	8	97
9	Team Goeleven	12							11	9	10																												97
10	Kawasaki Puccetti Racing	44	14	14	11	15	13	10	17	Ret	DNS				12	14	14	12	12	9	10	14	12	14	11	12	13	14	Ret	11	18	15	DNS	DNS	DNS	14	11	13	61
10	Kawasaki Puccetti Racing	53										16	16	17																									61
11	Barni Spark Racing Team	12																												12	12	13	11	11	11	13	9	Ret	56
11	Barni Spark Racing Team	29	12	17	16	18	20	14	13	15	15	14	14	13	18	22	16	14	14	10	15	15	13	Ret	12	11	17	18	13										56
12	Yamaha Motoxracing WorldSBK Team	2	17	15	14	14	16	11				11	17	12	21	21	21	21	20	11	19	19	14	13	15	10	16	Ret	14										36
12	Yamaha Motoxracing WorldSBK Team	17							16	Ret	17																												36
13	MIE Racing Honda Team	27																												20	21	21							13
13	MIE Racing Honda Team	35	21	22	20	20	22	17	19	16	19	17	13	Ret	17	19	20	Ret	15	12	20	17	19	WD	WD	WD	Ret	23	19				13	15	14	15	12	17	13
13	MIE Racing Honda Team	36	20	20	21	19	18	15	Ret	14	18	19	19	18	Ret	20	17	17	17	15	21	20	Ret	18	19	17	23	21	20	Ret	17	19	Ret	16	17	17	14	15	13
14	Gil Motor Sport–Yamaha	23	19	21	18	12	19	12	18	12	16	Ret	DNS	DNS	Ret	DNS	DNS	20	Ret	Ret	16	21	16	15	17	Ret	22	22	18										9
15	TPR Team Pedercini Racing	11																															Ret	19	Ret	12	18	18	8
15	TPR Team Pedercini Racing	25										Ret	Ret	Ret																									8
15	TPR Team Pedercini Racing	32							21	13	Ret																												8
15	TPR Team Pedercini Racing	39																												21	22	22							8
15	TPR Team Pedercini Racing	77																23	Ret	17																			8
15	TPR Team Pedercini Racing	84	23	24	23																																		8
15	TPR Team Pedercini Racing	91				16	17	13							15	13	Ret										Ret	19	Ret										8
15	TPR Team Pedercini Racing	99																			23	22	17	17	18	Ret													8
16	McAMS Yamaha	95													14	Ret	15																						3
17	Orelac Racing VerdNatura	52	22	23	22	21	23	18	20	17	20	20	20	19	23	24	22	16	Ret	16	22	23	18	19	20	18	24	24	23	19	20	18	16	18	15	19	20	14	3
18	Attack Performance Yamaha Racing	33																									19	16	15										1
Pos.	Team	Bike No.	ARA (Spain)			ASS (Netherlands)			EST (Portugal)			MIS (Italy)			DON (United Kingdom)			MOS (Czech Republic)			MAG (France)			BAR (Spain)			POR (Portugal)			VIL (Argentina)			MAN (Indonesia)			PHI (Australia)			Pts.

=== Manufacturers' championship ===
Pos.	Manufacturer	ARA (Spain)			ASS (Netherlands)			EST (Portugal)			MIS (Italy)			DON (United Kingdom)			MOS (Czech Republic)			MAG (France)			BAR (Spain)			POR (Portugal)			VIL (Argentina)			MAN (Indonesia)			PHI (Australia)			Pts.
Pos.	Manufacturer	R1	SR	R2	R1	SR	R2	R1	SR	R2	R1	SR	R2	R1	SR	R2	R1	SR	R2	R1	SR	R2	R1	SR	R2	R1	SR	R2	R1	SR	R2	R1	SR	R2	R1	SR	R2	Pts.
1	(Italy) Ducati	2	1	1	2	3	1	1	3	2	1	2	1	5	4	2	1	3	2	1	2	2	1	1	1	2	2	1	1	2	1	2	4	2	5	1	1	632
2	(Japan) Yamaha	3	3	3	3	2	2	2	2	3	6	1	2	1	1	1	2	1	1	5	1	1	3	4	3	1	1	2	8	1	2	1	1	1	2	2	4	577
3	(Japan) Kawasaki	1	2	2	1	1	4	3	1	1	2	3	4	2	2	3	4	2	3	4	3	4	2	2	4	3	3	3	2	3	3	3	2	3	1	3	2	530
4	(Germany) BMW	8	11	7	6	6	5	8	7	11	10	11	9	4	3	5	3	8	4	2	5	6	10	8	9	9	8	7	7	9	9	10	6	6	9	6	6	259
5	(Japan) Honda	6	8	8	5	5	3	5	4	6	7	4	5	8	7	10	8	7	7	9	11	10	6	7	6	8	10	8	4	6	6	6	9	7	8	8	9	258
Pos.	Manufacturer	ARA (Spain)			ASS (Netherlands)			EST (Portugal)			MIS (Italy)			DON (United Kingdom)			MOS (Czech Republic)			MAG (France)			BAR (Spain)			POR (Portugal)			VIL (Argentina)			MAN (Indonesia)			PHI (Australia)			Pts.
