= 2007 Czech Republic motorcycle Grand Prix =

2007 Czech Republic Grand Prix
Race details
- Race 12 of 18 races in the 2007 Grand Prix motorcycle racing season
- Date: 19 August 2007
- Official name: Cardion AB Grand Prix České republiky
- Location: Brno Circuit
- Course: Permanent racing facility; 5.403 km (3.357 mi)

MotoGP
Pole position
- Rider: (Australia) Casey Stoner
- Time: 1:56.884
Fastest lap
- Rider: (Australia) Casey Stoner
- Time: 1:58.301
Podium
- First: (Australia) Casey Stoner
- Second: (United States) John Hopkins
- Third: (United States) Nicky Hayden

250cc
Pole position
- Rider: (Spain) Jorge Lorenzo
- Time: 2:01.368
Fastest lap
- Rider: (Spain) Jorge Lorenzo
- Time: 2:02.299
Podium
- First: (Spain) Jorge Lorenzo
- Second: (Italy) Andrea Dovizioso
- Third: (Finland) Mika Kallio

125cc
Pole position
- Rider: (Hungary) Gábor Talmácsi
- Time: 2:06.861
Fastest lap
- Rider: (Czech Republic) Lukáš Pešek
- Time: 2:08.645
Podium
- First: (Spain) Héctor Faubel
- Second: (Italy) Mattia Pasini
- Third: (Czech Republic) Lukáš Pešek

The 2007 Czech Republic motorcycle Grand Prix was the twelfth round of the 2007 MotoGP championship. It took place on the weekend of 17–19 August 2007 at the Brno Circuit in Brno, Czech Republic.

== MotoGP classification ==
Pos.	No.	Rider	Team	Manufacturer	Laps	Time/Retired	Grid	Points
1	27	(Australia) Casey Stoner	Ducati Marlboro Team	Ducati	22	43:45.810	1	25
2	21	(United States) John Hopkins	Rizla Suzuki MotoGP	Suzuki	22	+7.903	4	20
3	1	(United States) Nicky Hayden	Repsol Honda Team	Honda	22	+13.100	2	16
4	26	(Spain) Dani Pedrosa	Repsol Honda Team	Honda	22	+15.800	3	13
5	71	(Australia) Chris Vermeulen	Rizla Suzuki MotoGP	Suzuki	22	+17.303	8	11
6	65	(Italy) Loris Capirossi	Ducati Marlboro Team	Ducati	22	+19.363	7	10
7	46	(Italy) Valentino Rossi	Fiat Yamaha Team	Yamaha	22	+22.485	6	9
8	14	(France) Randy de Puniet	Kawasaki Racing Team	Kawasaki	22	+23.073	5	8
9	4	(Brazil) Alex Barros	Pramac d'Antin	Ducati	22	+32.292	13	7
10	7	(Spain) Carlos Checa	Honda LCR	Honda	22	+35.153	12	6
11	24	(Spain) Toni Elías	Honda Gresini	Honda	22	+37.748	14	5
12	13	(Australia) Anthony West	Kawasaki Racing Team	Kawasaki	22	+38.250	16	4
13	50	(France) Sylvain Guintoli	Dunlop Yamaha Tech 3	Yamaha	22	+43.694	10	3
14	56	(Japan) Shinya Nakano	Konica Minolta Honda	Honda	22	+57.069	11	2
15	80	(United States) Kurtis Roberts	Team Roberts	KR212V	22	+1:09.603	17	1
16	22	(Spain) Iván Silva	Pramac d'Antin	Ducati	22	+1:21.410	20	
17	6	(Japan) Makoto Tamada	Dunlop Yamaha Tech 3	Yamaha	22	+1:25.804	15	
Ret	5	(United States) Colin Edwards	Fiat Yamaha Team	Yamaha	2	Retirement	9	
WD	33	(Italy) Marco Melandri	Honda Gresini	Honda		Withdrew		

== 250 cc classification ==
Pos.	No.	Rider	Manufacturer	Laps	Time/Retired	Grid	Points
1	1	(Spain) Jorge Lorenzo	Aprilia	20	41:04.954	1	25
2	34	(Italy) Andrea Dovizioso	Honda	20	+7.708	3	20
3	36	(Finland) Mika Kallio	KTM	20	+11.107	9	16
4	80	(Spain) Héctor Barberá	Aprilia	20	+13.422	5	13
5	19	(Spain) Álvaro Bautista	Aprilia	20	+13.944	2	11
6	4	(Japan) Hiroshi Aoyama	KTM	20	+13.989	10	10
7	12	(Switzerland) Thomas Lüthi	Aprilia	20	+22.817	12	9
8	60	(Spain) Julián Simón	Honda	20	+36.339	7	8
9	73	(Japan) Shuhei Aoyama	Honda	20	+36.367	8	7
10	15	(Italy) Roberto Locatelli	Gilera	20	+37.552	15	6
11	3	(San Marino) Alex de Angelis	Aprilia	20	+1:02.616	4	5
12	32	(Italy) Fabrizio Lai	Aprilia	20	+1:13.529	17	4
13	41	(Spain) Aleix Espargaró	Aprilia	20	+1:14.063	22	3
14	17	(Czech Republic) Karel Abraham	Aprilia	20	+1:14.575	20	2
15	7	(Spain) Efrén Vázquez	Aprilia	20	+1:14.643	19	1
16	8	(Thailand) Ratthapark Wilairot	Honda	20	+1:15.165	18	
17	28	(Germany) Dirk Heidolf	Aprilia	20	+1:15.474	16	
18	16	(France) Jules Cluzel	Aprilia	20	+1:40.064	21	
19	10	(Hungary) Imre Tóth	Aprilia	20	+1:53.798	23	
20	45	(United Kingdom) Dan Linfoot	Aprilia	20	+1:57.103	25	
Ret	25	(Italy) Alex Baldolini	Aprilia	18	Retirement	22	
Ret	50	(Republic of Ireland) Eugene Laverty	Honda	11	Retirement	24	
Ret	6	(Spain) Alex Debón	Aprilia	10	Accident	2	
Ret	55	(Japan) Yuki Takahashi	Honda	3	Accident	6	
Ret	58	(Italy) Marco Simoncelli	Gilera	2	Accident	14	
DNS	44	(Japan) Taro Sekiguchi	Aprilia		Did not start		
DNQ	89	(China) Ho Wan Chow	Aprilia		Did not qualify		
DNQ	87	(Czech Republic) Jiří Mayer	Honda		Did not qualify		
DNQ	88	(China) Zhu Wang	Aprilia		Did not qualify		
OFFICIAL 250cc REPORT

== 125 cc classification ==
Pos.	No.	Rider	Manufacturer	Laps	Time/Retired	Grid	Points
1	55	(Spain) Héctor Faubel	Aprilia	19	40:57.408	2	25
2	75	(Italy) Mattia Pasini	Aprilia	19	+0.070	3	20
3	52	(Czech Republic) Lukáš Pešek	Derbi	19	+0.222	5	16
4	14	(Hungary) Gábor Talmácsi	Aprilia	19	+0.272	1	13
5	71	(Japan) Tomoyoshi Koyama	KTM	19	+7.607	4	11
6	44	(Spain) Pol Espargaró	Aprilia	19	+12.066	10	10
7	24	(Italy) Simone Corsi	Aprilia	19	+12.394	14	9
8	60	(Austria) Michael Ranseder	Derbi	19	+13.003	11	8
9	34	(Switzerland) Randy Krummenacher	KTM	19	+19.764	6	7
10	11	(Germany) Sandro Cortese	Aprilia	19	+24.043	8	6
11	12	(Spain) Esteve Rabat	Honda	19	+33.634	18	5
12	6	(Spain) Joan Olivé	Aprilia	19	+33.725	16	4
13	38	(United Kingdom) Bradley Smith	Honda	19	+33.863	13	3
14	7	(France) Alexis Masbou	Honda	19	+34.263	15	2
15	27	(Italy) Stefano Bianco	Aprilia	19	+39.034	24	1
16	51	(United States) Steve Bonsey	KTM	19	+43.841	27	
17	8	(Italy) Lorenzo Zanetti	Aprilia	19	+44.121	20	
18	35	(Italy) Raffaele De Rosa	Aprilia	19	+44.413	22	
19	15	(Italy) Federico Sandi	Aprilia	19	+44.468	21	
20	63	(France) Mike Di Meglio	Honda	19	+44.666	19	
21	20	(Italy) Roberto Tamburini	Aprilia	19	+52.028	14	
22	18	(Spain) Nicolás Terol	Derbi	19	+57.920	25	
23	86	(Spain) Ricard Cardús	Aprilia	19	+58.099	30	
24	37	(Netherlands) Joey Litjens	Honda	19	+58.538	28	
25	94	(Germany) Toni Wirsing	Honda	19	+1:10.607	31	
26	13	(Italy) Dino Lombardi	Honda	19	+1:12.782	34	
27	56	(Netherlands) Hugo van den Berg	Aprilia	19	+1:16.595	26	
28	99	(United Kingdom) Danny Webb	Honda	19	+1:23.792	32	
29	77	(Switzerland) Dominique Aegerter	Aprilia	19	+1:23.879	29	
30	53	(Italy) Simone Grotzkyj	Aprilia	19	+1:29.979	33	
31	92	(Czech Republic) Karel Pešek	Aprilia	18	+1 lap	37	
Ret	33	(Spain) Sergio Gadea	Aprilia	16	Accident	7	
Ret	29	(Italy) Andrea Iannone	Aprilia	15	Retirement	17	
Ret	22	(Spain) Pablo Nieto	Aprilia	11	Accident	9	
Ret	95	(Romania) Robert Mureșan	Derbi	8	Accident	23	
Ret	93	(Czech Republic) Michal Prášek	Honda	7	Retirement	35	
Ret	91	(Czech Republic) Karel Májek	FGR	6	Retirement	36	
OFFICIAL 125cc REPORT

== Championship standings after the race (MotoGP) ==
Below are the standings for the top five riders and constructors after round twelve has concluded.

Riders' Championship standings

Pos.	Rider	Points
1	(Australia) Casey Stoner	246
2	(Italy) Valentino Rossi	186
3	(Spain) Dani Pedrosa	168
4	(Australia) Chris Vermeulen	124
5	(United States) John Hopkins	124

Constructors' Championship standings

Pos.	Constructor	Points
1	(Italy) Ducati	258
2	(Japan) Yamaha	206
3	(Japan) Honda	206
4	(Japan) Suzuki	171
5	(Japan) Kawasaki	82

- Note: Only the top five positions are included for both sets of standings.

Previous race: 2007 United States Grand Prix	FIM Grand Prix World Championship; 2007 season	Next race: 2007 San Marino Grand Prix
Previous race: 2006 Czech Republic Grand Prix	Czech Republic motorcycle Grand Prix	Next race: 2008 Czech Republic Grand Prix
