= Mika Kallio =

Finnish motorcycle racer

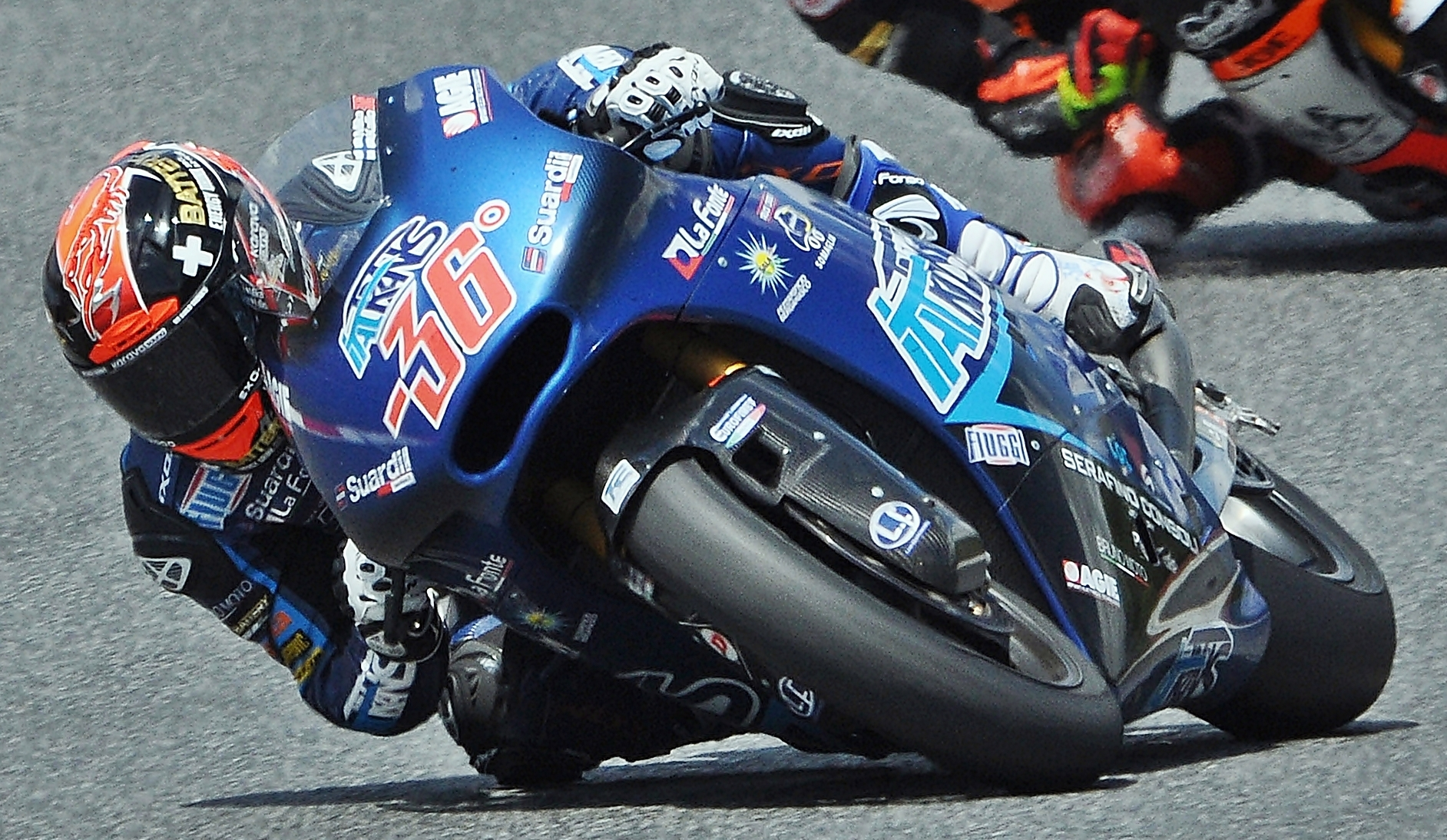
- Kallio at the 2015 Catalan Grand Prix.
- Nationality: Finnish
- Born: 8 November 1982 (age 44); Valkeakoski, Finland
- Current team: Red Bull KTM Factory Racing (Test rider)
- Bike number: 82
- Website: mikakallio.com
Motorcycle racing career statistics
MotoGP World Championship
Active years	2009–2010, 2016–2020
Manufacturers	Ducati, KTM
Championships	0
2020 championship position	NC (0 pts)
Starts / Wins / Podiums / Poles / F. laps / Points; 46 / 0 / 0 / 0 / 0 / 138
Moto2 World Championship
Active years	2011–2015
Manufacturers	Suter, Kalex, Speed Up
Championships	0
2015 championship position	15th (72 pts)
Starts / Wins / Podiums / Poles / F. laps / Points; 86 / 4 / 16 / 4 / 4 / 740
250cc World Championship
Active years	2007–2008
Manufacturers	KTM
Championships	0
2008 championship position	3rd (196 pts)
Starts / Wins / Podiums / Poles / F. laps / Points; 33 / 5 / 10 / 2 / 4 / 353
125cc World Championship
Active years	2001–2006
Manufacturers	Honda, KTM
Championships	0
2006 championship position	2nd (262 pts)
Starts / Wins / Podiums / Poles / F. laps / Points; 82 / 7 / 23 / 12 / 4 / 751

Mika Kallio (born 8 November 1982) is a Finnish Grand Prix motorcycle racer, currently serving as the lead test and development rider for the Red Bull KTM team in MotoGP. He debuted in the 125cc World Championship with the Finnish rookie team Ajo Motorsport in the 2001 German Grand Prix and was awarded the "Rookie of the Year" with the team in 2002. After moving to the Red Bull KTM Factory Racing team during the 2003 season, he finished runner-up in the 125cc class in both 2005 and 2006, and also finished runner-up in the 2014 Moto2 World Championship. Moving up to MotoGP full-time for 2009 and 2010, he obtained the "Rookie of the Year" award in his first season in the premier class.

== Career ==
=== Early career ===
Born in Valkeakoski, Kallio started racing in 1997 and won the 1998 Finnish championship in road racing, with further success in the competition in 1999 and 2000. During 2000, he also became the Nordic champion, after finishing second in the prior year.

While Kallio pursued his road racing goals, the Finn has also scored plenty of success in ice racing back home in Finland, having achieved the Finnish motorcycle ice racing championship in 2000, 2004 and 2005 in the 125cc class. At 500cc level, Kallio also won the title in 2004 and 2006.

=== 125cc World Championship (2001–2006) ===
Kallio made his debut in the 125cc World Championship as a wildcard rider at the 2001 German Grand Prix, but did not finish the race.

Continuing with Ajo Motorsport and the Honda RS125R for a full season in 2002, he finished in the points ten times, nine times in the top-ten, with a fifth place in Jerez being the highest of the year. Kallio ended the season with 78 points, 11th in the rider's championship, and won Rookie of the Year, in front of fellow rookies Héctor Barberá, Andrea Dovizioso and Jorge Lorenzo.

Kallio started the 2003 season with Ajo Motorsport, partnering Masao Azuma, but halfway through the season, following him outperforming factory KTM rider Arnaud Vincent, the riders were switched, Kallio being promoted to Red Bull KTM, KTM's factory team. He immediately took his career's best fourth place in Czech Republic, and scored his first ever podium in the 125cc class, a second place at Sepang behind Dani Pedrosa. Kallio finished the year 11th in the standings, with 88 points.

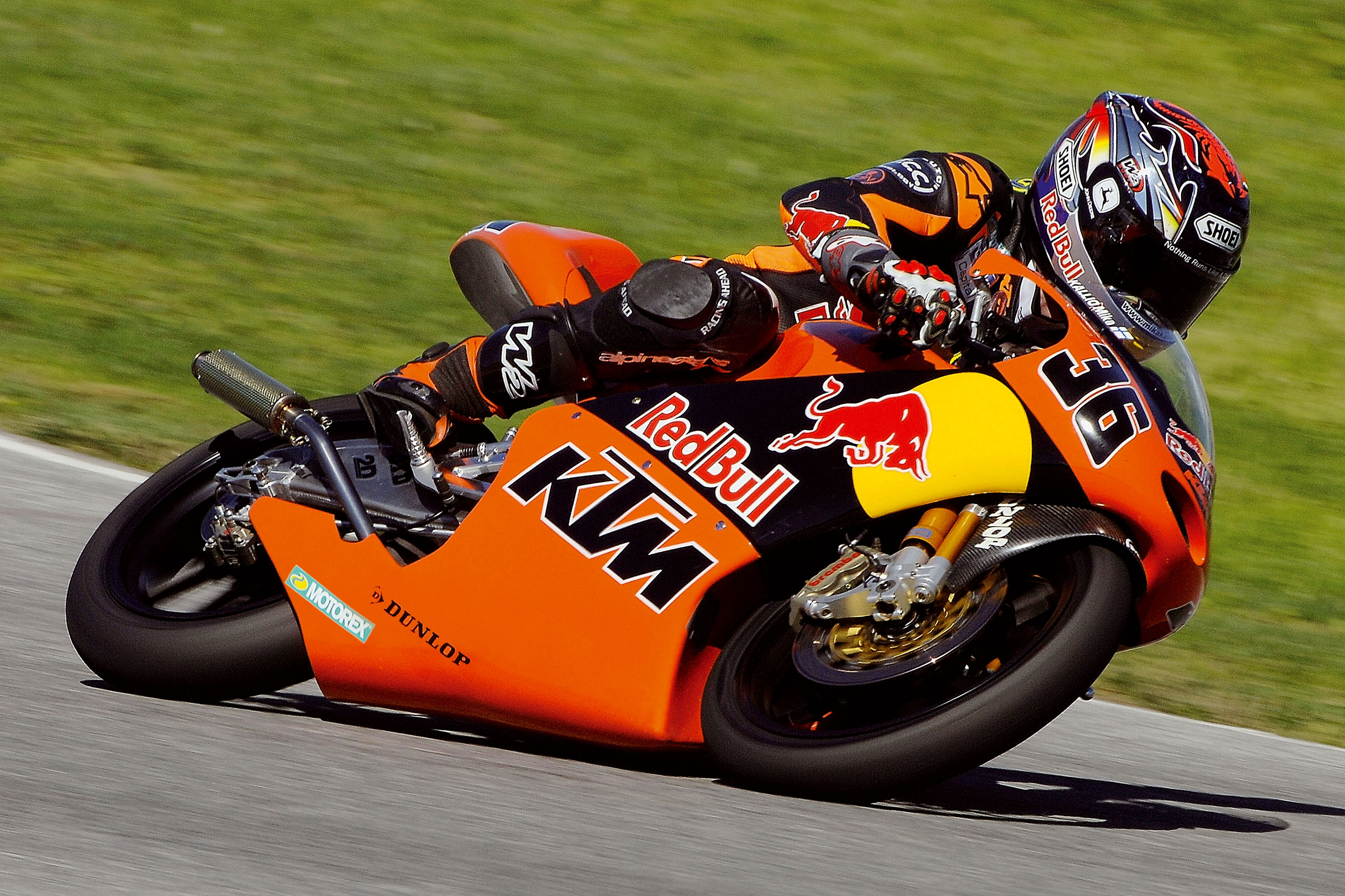
Kallio racing with his KTM bike.

Signing 2003 Rookie of the Year Casey Stoner to partner 2002 Rookie of the Year Kallio, Red Bull KTM went all in for the 2004 season, but their bikes were full of reliability issues, Stoner being forced to retire five times, and Kallio eight times (including three times from the first six races, and five times from the last seven races of the year). He ended the season tenth in the championship, with 86 points.

The 2005 season would be his breakout year. Stoner moved up to the 250cc category, with Gábor Talmácsi being brought in to be Kallio's new teammate. Kallio started the year well, with a second place in Jerez, before taking his first championship pole position and victory, at the second round of the 2005 season in Estoril. He went on to take another pole in Shanghai but ended the race only in 11th, followed by a third place in Le Mans, another pole with a retirement in Mugello, a pole position and a third place in Barcelona, a fifth consecutive pole position in Assen, followed by a retirement in the race, and a sixth pole in Donnington, where he ended the race in seventh. Following the summer break, he scored his seventh pole position of the year in Germany, his fifth consecutive pole position, both records in the category, and followed it up with a dominant win, setting fastest lap as well. His pole position streak was halted by main championship rival Thomas Lüthi in Brno, with Lüthi dominating the weekend and winning the race, Kallio coming in second. The two would keep exchanging blows, Kallio winning in Japan and Lüthi in second, Lüthi winning in Malaysia, Kallio finishing in second.

An infamous incident happened in the race in Qatar, with only four races remaining. Kallio started from pole, and led the entire race, closely followed by teammate Gábor Talmácsi. Before the race, Talmácsi had been ordered by the KTM team to stay back and not to fight with Kallio, seeing how he was not a title contender, and would only take away points. The Hungarian rider stayed behind Kallio the whole race, but in the final lap's finish straight, pulled out from behind Kallio's slipstream and passed the Finn on the last few meters of the race, to take the win by 0.017 seconds. Talmácsi said that he thought there was one more lap to go, despite the team showing them the board before the final lap, from pitwall. The lost five points turned out to be incredibly valuable to Kallio, as he only finished fifth in Australia, had to retire in Turkey, and went into the final round in Valencia, with a 23-point deficit compared to Lüthi, meaning he needed a win, with the Swiss rider scoring no more than two points. Kallio won the final race in Valencia, Lüthi coming home in ninth, meaning Kallio lost the world title by just five points, the exact difference between first place and second place championship points. Both riders had four wins during the season, but Kallio would have had five if not for Qatar, thus winning the title with equal points, but more race wins. Talmácsi was fired after the season finale at Valencia.

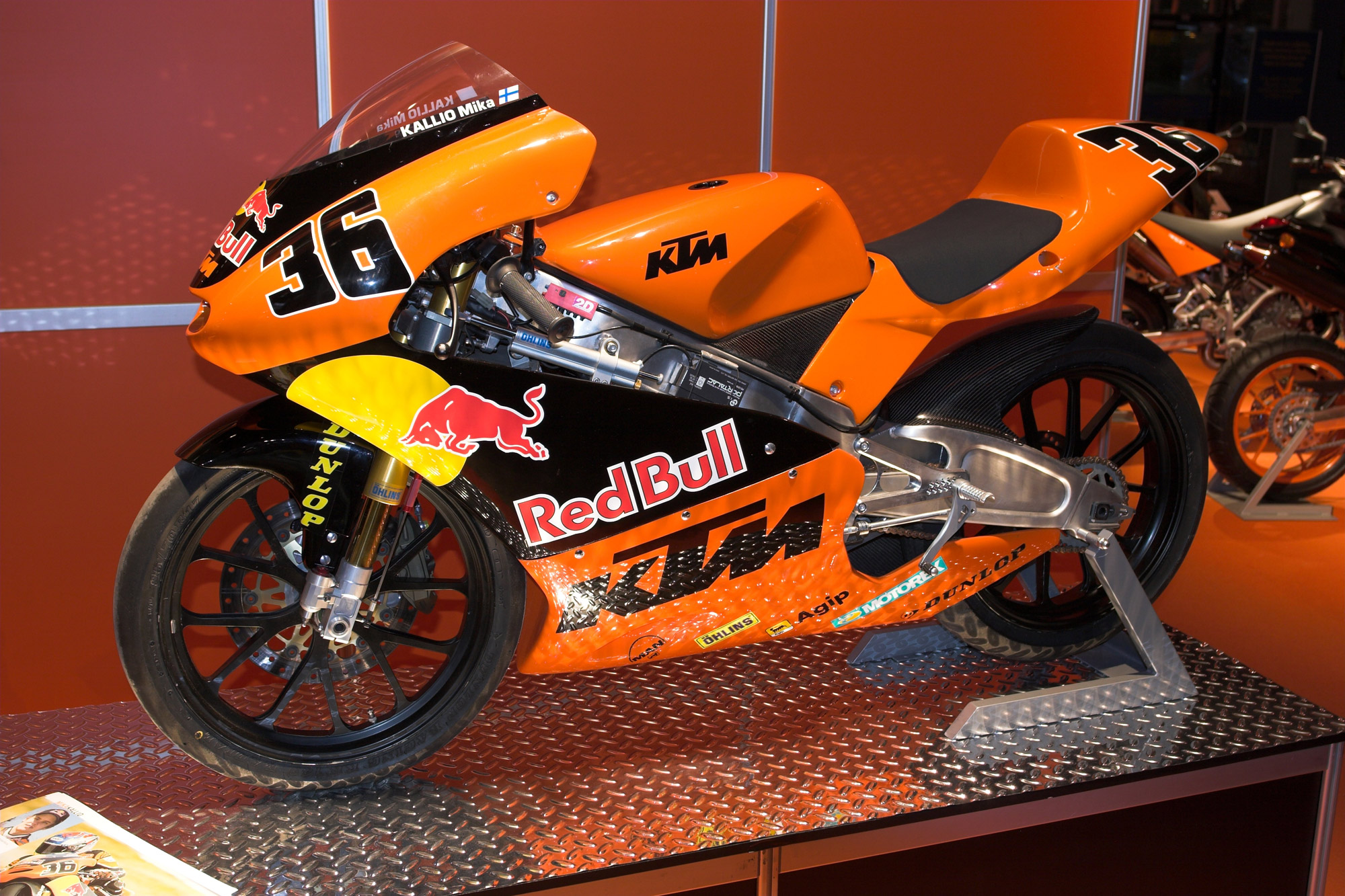
Kallio's 125cc KTM bike.

In 2006, Kallio was again a challenger for the 125cc title, and although he produced his career's best season, the young Finn was outshone by Álvaro Bautista, who won the title by 76 points. Kallio was forced to settle for the runner-up spot in the championship again, although he did finish a full 65 points ahead of Héctor Faubel in third position. Kallio scored three victories, in Shanghai, Assen and Motegi, had four pole positions, and finished on the podium 11 times (three victories, seven second places, and a third place) during the 2006 campaign. At the end of the year, viewers of the Finnish motorsport television series Ruutulippu voted Kallio the Finnish Motorsportsman of the Year for the second year running. He collected 33.1% of all votes and finished in front of enduro world champion Samuli Aro, WRC runner-up Marcus Grönholm and F1 star Kimi Räikkönen.

=== 250cc World Championship (2007–2008) ===
For the 2007 season, Kallio moved up to KTM's squad in the 250cc category, riding alongside Hiroshi Aoyama. After a difficult start to the season with mechanical woes at Qatar and Spain, Kallio would consistently be fighting around the top-six positions, finishing sixth in Turkey, fifth in China, seventh in France, sixth in Catalonia, sixth in Great Britain, and eighth in the Netherlands. The turning point of the season would be at Germany, where Kallio took his debut pole position and podium finish in the class, coming home in second, behind teammate Aoyama, to cap a fine 1–2 for KTM. A third place followed at the Czech Republic, but a nasty highside at San Marino, and more mechanical problems at Portugal cooled off his chances to become Rookie of the Year, and perhaps finish in the top 5. Kallio would capture his first 250cc class victory at the rain-soaked Japanese race, before crashing out in Australia, a fourth place in Malaysia, and a brilliant win in Valencia, fending off Alex de Angelis on the final lap. He ended his rookie season with two wins, two pole positions, four podiums and two fastest laps, placing him seventh in the rider standings with 157 points, second among rookies.

Kallio remained at KTM for 2008. A very strong start to the season saw him finish on the podium during the first four races, a third place at the season opener under the floodlights of Qatar, a fortunate win at Jerez after title rivals Álvaro Bautista and Marco Simoncelli crashed out together on the final lap, another solid third place at Portugal, before continuing his strong run with a masterful victory in China under tricky conditions. Kallio had built up a strong lead in the championship, but his luck would begin to change for the worse with a fifth place in Le Mans, a fourth place in Mugello, and the race in Barcelona, where his bike broke down, causing Kallio to nearly crash on his way back to the pits, resulting in his lead in the championship disappearing. His woes seemed to continue at Donington Park after qualifying only 14th, but he cut through the field fairly quickly, often overtaking multiple riders in a lap, and took a surprise victory. As it later turned out, this was to be his final win in the season, and in the 250cc category, the intermediate class switching to 600cc bikes, and rebranding as Moto2 in the following seasons. The KTM riders struggled to keep up with the pace of Piaggio riders, Kallio finishing seventh in Assen, fourth at the Sachsenring, fifth in Brno, and retiring in Misano. His title challenge was mathematically over in Australia, having been passed by eventual champion Simoncelli and Bautista a few laps before the end of the race, finishing in third place. A technical issue in Malaysia saw him retire on lap 5, and the final round at Valencia ended with Kallio limping home in 11th, having been the only rider to keep pace with the new world champion, Simoncelli, and pushing to the limit to keep up and launch an attack on the final lap, crashing in the overly eager pace. He wrapped up the year to finish third in the overall standings with 196 points, three victories, three third places, and two fastest laps, not scoring a single pole position.

=== MotoGP World Championship (2009–2010) ===
On 19 October 2008, Kallio was announced as part of the new Pramac Racing lineup for the 2009 MotoGP season, riding alongside Italian Niccolò Canepa. Kallio was provided with the latest spec Ducati Desmosedici GP9 ensuring equality for the satellite teams and the factory squad. His MotoGP career started brightly with two eighth places from the opening two rounds at Qatar and Motegi. He then retired from the races in Jerez and Le Mans, before a 13th place in Mugello, and a ninth place in Barcelona. During much of the season however would be blighted with several accidents, most notably at the race in Assen, where Kallio crashed out of sixth place and burnt his finger down to the bone, losing the top section. He missed the race at Laguna Seca Raceway, being replaced by Aleix Espargaró, but was back in action at the Sachsenring in Germany, racing with a special custom-made glove to accommodate the bandage.

Kallio finished 14th in Germany, and tenth in England, when prior to the Czech race, Casey Stoner announced that he would miss the next three races due to health problems. Kallio was called in to replace Stoner at the Ducati factory team, retiring in Brno, finishing eighth in Indianapolis, and seventh in Rimini. Once his stint in place of Stoner was over, Kallio returned to Pramac for the final four races of the season, retiring in Portugal, finishing ninth in Australia, tenth in Malaysia, and ninth in Valencia. Overall it had been a positive debut season in the top class, and his 71 points amassed saw him rewarded with the "Rookie of the Year" award.

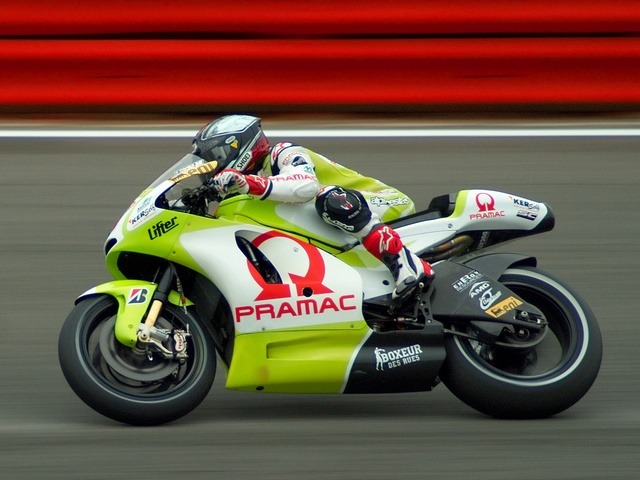
Kallio at the 2010 British Grand Prix.

On 30 September 2009, Kallio announced that he had signed a new one-year contract with Pramac Ducati that would see him ride for the team in the 2010 season. The 2010 season would prove to be an extremely difficult season for Kallio however. His new teammate Aleix Espargaró replaced Canepa, and gave Kallio a harder time than the Italian, often matching or outpacing him. Kallio would only pick up two top-ten finishes throughout the whole season, an impressive seventh at Jerez from the back of the grid, and ninth place at Laguna Seca. On 17 October 2010, Kallio announced that he would not be competing in the final two rounds of the 2010 season, due to a shoulder injury that he had been riding with, since Le Mans in May. Kallio and Pramac parted ways, as he had not been offered a contract for 2011 by the team, finishing the season with 43 points, 17th in the rider's championship.

=== Moto2 World Championship (2011–2015) ===
==== 2011 ====
On 7 November 2010, it had been announced that Kallio would move down a category to Moto2, teaming up with the Suter-run Marc VDS Racing Team alongside British rider Scott Redding for 2011. The season proved to be a difficult one for himself and the team as both Kallio and Redding struggled for results on board the Suter. Mika's opening half of 2011 saw just a single points scoring finish in the first nine races. However, the second half of the season saw results steadily improve, as the Finn racked up points in eight of the final nine races. The main highlight was securing second place at the final round of the season at Valencia, after a close battle with Swiss rider Dominique Aegerter in damp conditions. It was Kallio's first podium for three years. The result was enough to earn the Finn a second season with Marc VDS, as he rounded up the year in 16th position, with 61 points.

==== 2012 ====
During the off season, Marc VDS ditched the Suter frames, in favour of Kalex for the upcoming 2012 season. The change resulted in a much more competitive season for the team and Kallio. After scoring seven top 10 finishes from the opening seven rounds, the Finn then achieved a strong second place at the Sachsenring, after a race long battle with eventual Moto2 champion Marc Marquez and Alex de Angelis. Marquez edged away in the final laps towards victory, leaving Kallio and de Angelis to fight for second. De Angelis attempted a pass at the final corner, but the Finn calmly retook the position, cutting back underneath the San Marino rider. It was to be his only podium of the season, although Kallio would continue to produce strong results throughout the remainder of the season.

Two fourth places at Indianapolis Motor Speedway and Misano World Circuit would be his highest finishes in the second half of the season. One other notable highlight was at the Malaysian round. In typically tropical wet conditions, Kallio had to take avoiding action from a separate crash on the opening lap, skating across the gravel and dropping all the way down the order to 29th place. The Finn put in a determined display and produced a superb comeback in the mixed conditions, to finish the race in seventh place, which later became 6th, after Anthony West's disqualification.

Such was the level of his consistency throughout 2012, Kallio only failed to score points at just two events. In Japan, he had been running comfortably inside the top 10 until he had an off track moment into the gravel, dropping down to 20th, before recovering to just finish out of the points in 16th. The other was an unfortunate incident, being taken out by Simone Corsi at Phillip Island Grand Prix Circuit with just two laps remaining, while fighting for sixth place. It was to be his only retirement in 2012, ending a run of 23 consecutive race finishes. Overall it was a positive season for the Finn, as he ended the year in sixth position with 130 points, more than double the amount of the previous season.

==== 2013 ====
Kallio remained at Marc VDS for a third season in 2013. Carrying on the progression made from the previous two seasons, Kallio started the season well, with a fifth place at the season opener in Qatar. The early rounds saw two podium finishes, a third place at the brand new Circuit of the Americas and second place in France, behind teammate Scott Redding, earning Marc VDS their first one-two finish in Moto2. With the exception of crashing out at third round in Jerez, the Finnish rider would finish every race that season, all inside the points.

His strong form led to a major break through, as he would go onto secure his first victory in Moto2, at the Czech Republic, starting from fourth on the grid. Kallio came out on top of in a race which saw a race-long battle involving Japanese rider Takaaki Nakagami, and former 125cc title rival Thomas Lüthi: it was Kallio's first victory in five years. His good form remained intact during the remaining races, as he continued to rack up healthy points finishes. Several more first-time Moto2 achievements were soon to follow, including his first fastest lap in the class in Malaysia on his way to finishing fourth, and he ended his long wait for a pole position, mastering the changeable conditions at the penultimate round in Motegi: his first pole position since Valencia 2007. On Sunday, he would go onto take his fourth podium in 2013, finishing the race in second place, behind newly crowned champion Pol Espargaró. At the 2013 season's end, Kallio was fourth in the rider's championship, with 188 points, one victory, four podiums, one pole position, and a fastest lap.

==== 2014 ====
With Espargaró and Redding moving up to MotoGP, Kallio went into the 2014 Moto2 season as one of the pre-season favourites for the title. He was joined by Spanish rider Esteve Rabat for a fourth season at Marc VDS. His quest for the title began well, as he recovered from a nasty crash in qualifying, to finish in third place at Qatar, but was later promoted to second, after Nakagami's bike was disqualified on technical grounds. Two solid points scoring races followed, before scoring his first pole position and race win of the season, at Circuito de Jerez, leading from start to finish. The Finn backed up his Spanish success by immediately winning the next race at Le Mans, his first ever back to back victories in his career.

The next two races yielded further points, before Kallio embarking on a six race podium streak, starting at Assen where he recovered to finish in third despite an early off track moment in the wet conditions. In Germany, Kallio was narrowly pipped to victory by Dominique Aegerter on the final lap, after a race long battle with the Swiss. However, Kallio would finally get his reward, with a flawless performance at Indianapolis, taking the full house of pole position, race victory, fastest lap and leading every lap of the race. His victory was his 16th of his career, surpassing the late Jarno Saarinen's win tally of 15, to become Finland's most successful race winner in MotoGP history. The points gap between himself and championship leader Rabat had now narrowed to just seven points.

A string of three consecutive second places followed at Brno, Silverstone, and Misano. Silverstone in particular produced a hard-fought final lap showdown between himself and Rabat for victory, but ultimately Rabat won the battle of the teammates. It would prove to be the decisive moment in the championship, as the momentum swung towards Rabat in the final third of the season. On 1 September 2014, Marc VDS announced Álex Márquez would join the team in 2015 alongside Rabat, leaving Kallio to seek employment elsewhere for next season.

Despite the news, Kallio pressed on and secured his third pole position at Misano, but once again on race day, he had to settle for second behind Rabat. In the final five races, Kallio would only secure one more podium, a second place in Malaysia, as Rabat scored enough points to seal the title. The final race at Valencia saw his only retirement of the season, as the Finn was slammed from behind by Maverick Vinales on the opening lap. The incident eliminated both riders, ending Mika's run of 31 consecutive points finishes, a career best. Nonetheless, Kallio clinched second place overall in the rider's standings, concluding the year with three wins, and a personal best of 288 points scored.

==== 2015 ====
On 26 September 2014, a contract was confirmed between Kallio and the Italtrans team for 2015 Moto2 season. The Finn veteran would be partnered with Italian Franco Morbidelli. After a highly successful 2014, 2015 would mark a total polar opposite in performance and results. Initially the season started solidly, with three top eight results from the opening three rounds. But a fourth place at Argentina would be the high point of what would develop into a very difficult season for Kallio. Four of the next seven races resulted in retirements. Indianapolis briefly offered a glimmer of hope after qualifying on the front row, until a crash with Sam Lowes ended his race. Despite the best efforts from both Kallio and Italtrans to find a solution to difficulties Kallio faced with the 2015 Kalex, there was seemingly little hope of improvement. After the Misano race, on 14 September 2015, it was decided upon that both parties would mutually agree to cancel the remainder of the contract, and part ways immediately.

Days later, the QMMF Racing Team announced that Kallio would be joining the team for the rest of the season, on board a Speed Up, replacing Anthony West. Kallio finished inside the points for all five races with the team, to wrap-up 2015 on a slightly better note, to an otherwise very unsatisfactory season, down in 15th position in the rider's championship, with just 72 points.

=== Return to MotoGP, as test rider (2016–present) ===
KTM confirmed Kallio as their lead test rider on 27 October 2015, for the upcoming MotoGP project, in preparation for the 2017 season.

Despite missing out on a full-time race return for the 2017 season, Kallio would at least be rewarded for his testing efforts: a wildcard race entry was granted at the 2016 finale in Valencia, marking his first race back in the premier class since 2010.

For the 2017 season, Kallio continued testing duties with KTM. The team initially handed the Finn two wildcard entries, at the German and Austrian rounds. Having narrowly missed out on a points finish at the Sachsenring, Mika produced an impressive display at KTM's home race in Austria, coming through the field to finish as the team's leading rider in 10th place, well ahead of teammate Bradley Smith. Not only was it the team's second top 10 finish of the season, but the result was also the first time a KTM bike had managed to finish a premier class race less than 20 seconds from the race winner.

After his superb ride in Austria, KTM announced Kallio would be handed his third wildcard of the season at Aragon. Once more, the Finn produced a strong showing throughout the event. Having automatically qualified through into Q2 in 12th position as the fastest KTM, he would back up his qualifying efforts by coming home in 11th, just behind teammate Espargaro, but some 19 seconds ahead of Smith. After Aragon, the Finn was initially unsure whether he would receive any more race opportunities in 2017, but on 28 September, he was granted a fourth and final wildcard ride at the season finale in Valencia. Kallio's performances from his wildcard outings put him in contention for a possible full-time ride in place of Smith for 2018. However, on October 11, KTM ended speculation surrounding their rider lineup, electing to keep Smith as the team's race rider for next season, with Kallio continuing his role as KTM's test rider, with plans for more wildcards.

Kallio suffered a serious knee injury when racing as a scheduled wildcard entry at the Sachsenring, German round in July 2018, disrupting the KTM test programme. KTM was forced to contract Randy De Puniet as a replacement test rider for the remainder of 2018, and to end any further test-rider entries at races, being too risky for their future plans. KTM MotoGP rider Pol Espargaró was also injured soon after.

In 2019, Kallio replaced Johann Zarco mid-season, after Zarco and KTM broke contract. Kallio finished the year with seven points in six races.

In November 2020, Kallio was announced to replace Iker Lecuona at the two rounds in Valencia, and the Portuguese GP, after Lecuona tested positive for COVID-19.

== Personal life ==
Kallio has an older brother named Vesa, who is also a motorcycle racer. Finnish software house Tracebit also produced a mobile phone game based around Kallio, called 'Mika Kallio GP'.

== Career statistics ==
=== Grand Prix motorcycle racing ===
==== By season ====
Season	Class	Motorcycle	Team	Race	Win	Podium	Pole	FLap	Pts	Plcd
2001	125cc	Honda	Team Red Devil Honda	2	0	0	0	0	0	NC
2002	125cc	Honda	Red Devil Honda	16	0	0	0	0	78	11th
2003	125cc	Honda	Ajo Motorsport	16	0	1	0	0	88	11th
2003	125cc	KTM	Red Bull KTM	16	0	1	0	0	88	11th
2004	125cc	KTM	Red Bull KTM	16	0	1	0	0	86	10th
2005	125cc	KTM	Red Bull KTM GP125	16	4	10	8	3	237	**2nd**
2006	125cc	KTM	Red Bull KTM GP125	16	3	11	4	1	262	**2nd**
2007	250cc	KTM	Red Bull KTM 250	17	2	4	2	2	157	7th
2008	250cc	KTM	Red Bull KTM 250	16	3	6	0	2	196	**3rd**
2009	MotoGP	Ducati	Pramac Racing	16	0	0	0	0	71	15th
2009	MotoGP	Ducati	Ducati Marlboro Team	16	0	0	0	0	71	15th
2010	MotoGP	Ducati	Pramac Racing	16	0	0	0	0	43	17th
2011	Moto2	Suter	Marc VDS Racing Team	17	0	1	0	0	61	16th
2012	Moto2	Kalex	Marc VDS Racing Team	17	0	1	0	0	130	6th
2013	Moto2	Kalex	Marc VDS Racing Team	17	1	4	1	1	188	4th
2014	Moto2	Kalex	Marc VDS Racing Team	18	3	10	3	3	289	**2nd**
2015	Moto2	Kalex	Italtrans Racing Team	18	0	0	0	0	72	15th
2015	Moto2	Speed Up	QMMF Racing Team	18	0	0	0	0	72	15th
2016	MotoGP	KTM	Red Bull KTM Factory Racing	1	0	0	0	0	0	NC
2017	MotoGP	KTM	Red Bull KTM Factory Racing	4	0	0	0	0	11	24th
2018	MotoGP	KTM	Red Bull KTM Factory Racing	2	0	0	0	0	6	25th
2019	MotoGP	KTM	Red Bull KTM Factory Racing	6	0	0	0	0	7	26th
2020	MotoGP	KTM	Red Bull KTM Tech3	1	0	0	0	0	0	24th
Total				**247**	**16**	**49**	**18**	**12**	**1982**	

==== By class ====
Class	Seasons	1st GP	1st Pod	1st Win	Race	Win	Podiums	Pole	FLap	Pts	WChmp
125cc	2001–2006	2001 Germany	2003 Malaysia	2005 Portugal	82	7	23	12	4	751	0
250cc	2007–2008	2007 Qatar	2007 Germany	2007 Japan	33	5	10	2	4	353	0
MotoGP	2009–2010, 2016–2020	2009 Qatar			46	0	0	0	0	138	0
Moto2	2011–2015	2011 Qatar	2011 Valencia	2013 Czech Republic	86	4	16	4	4	740	0
Total	2001–2020				**247**	**16**	**49**	**18**	**12**	**1982**	**0**

==== Races by year ====
(key) (Races in bold indicate pole position, races in italics indicate fastest lap)

Year	Class	Bike	1	2	3	4	5	6	7	8	9	10	11	12	13	14	15	16	17	18	19	Pos	Pts
2001	125cc	Honda	JPN	RSA	SPA	FRA	ITA	CAT	NED	GBR	GER; Ret	CZE	POR	VAL; Ret	PAC	AUS	MAL	BRA				NC	0
2002	125cc	Honda	JPN; Ret	RSA; 12	SPA; 5	FRA; 8	ITA; Ret	CAT; 9	NED; Ret	GBR; Ret	GER; 9	CZE; 10	POR; 8	BRA; 8	PAC; 6	MAL; 7	AUS; Ret	VAL; 16				11th	78
2003	125cc	Honda	JPN; 11	RSA; 7	SPA; 16	FRA; Ret	ITA; 13	CAT; 7	NED; 11	GBR; 7	GER; 10											11th	88
2003	125cc	KTM										CZE; 4	POR; DSQ	BRA; 19	PAC; 7	MAL; 2	AUS; Ret	VAL; Ret				11th	88
2004	125cc	KTM	RSA; 12	SPA; Ret	FRA; 6	ITA; Ret	CAT; 9	NED; Ret	BRA; 8	GER; 5	GBR; 4	CZE; Ret	POR; 2	JPN; Ret	QAT; 4	MAL; Ret	AUS; Ret	VAL; Ret				10th	86
2005	125cc	KTM	SPA; 2	**POR**; 1	**CHN**; 11	FRA; 3	**ITA**; Ret	**CAT**; 3	**NED**; Ret	**GBR**; 7	**GER**; 1	CZE; 2	JPN; 1	MAL; 2	**QAT**; 2	AUS; 5	TUR; Ret	VAL; 1				**2nd**	**237**
2006	125cc	KTM	SPA; 4	QAT; 2	TUR; Ret	**CHN**; 1	FRA; 2	ITA; 6	CAT; Ret	**NED**; 1	GBR; 2	GER; 8	**CZE**; 2	MAL; 2	**AUS**; 2	JPN; 1	POR; 3	VAL; 2				**2nd**	**262**
2007	250cc	KTM	QAT; Ret	SPA; Ret	TUR; 6	CHN; 5	FRA; 7	ITA; Ret	CAT; 6	GBR; 6	NED; 8	**GER**; 2	CZE; 3	RSM; Ret	POR; Ret	JPN; 1	AUS; Ret	MAL; 4	**VAL**; 1			7th	157
2008	250cc	KTM	QAT; 3	SPA; 1	POR; 3	CHN; 1	FRA; 5	ITA; 4	CAT; Ret	GBR; 1	NED; 7	GER; 4	CZE; 5	RSM; Ret	INP; C	JPN; 4	AUS; 3	MAL; Ret	VAL; 11			**3rd**	**196**
2009	MotoGP	Ducati	QAT; 8	JPN; 8	SPA; Ret	FRA; Ret	ITA; 13	CAT; 9	NED; Ret	USA	GER; 14	GBR; 10	CZE; Ret	INP; 8	RSM; 7	POR; Ret	AUS; 9	MAL; 10	VAL; 9			15th	71
2010	MotoGP	Ducati	QAT; Ret	SPA; 7	FRA; 13	ITA; Ret	GBR; 13	NED; 11	CAT; 12	GER; Ret	USA; 9	CZE; Ret	INP; Ret	RSM; Ret	ARA; 14	JPN; 15	MAL; 12	AUS; 11	POR	VAL		17th	43
2011	Moto2	Suter	QAT; 20	SPA; 17	POR; Ret	FRA; Ret	CAT; 8	GBR; Ret	NED; Ret	ITA; 17	GER; DNS	CZE; 13	INP; 9	RSM; 15	ARA; 10	JPN; 10	AUS; 16	MAL; 6	VAL; 2			16th	61
2012	Moto2	Kalex	QAT; 10	SPA; 7	POR; 9	FRA; 5	CAT; 9	GBR; 10	NED; 10	GER; 2	ITA; 11	INP; 4	CZE; 9	RSM; 4	ARA; 15	JPN; 16	MAL; 6	AUS; Ret	VAL; 7			6th	130
2013	Moto2	Kalex	QAT; 5	AME; 3	SPA; Ret	FRA; 2	ITA; 5	CAT; 9	NED; 4	GER; 12	INP; 7	CZE; 1	GBR; 6	RSM; 9	ARA; 5	MAL; 4	AUS; 7	**JPN**; 2	VAL; 14			4th	188
2014	Moto2	Kalex	QAT; 2	AME; 4	ARG; 7	**SPA**; 1	FRA; 1	ITA; 6	CAT; 4	NED; 3	GER; 2	**INP**; 1	CZE; 2	GBR; 2	**RSM**; 2	ARA; 7	JPN; 5	AUS; 4	MAL; 2	VAL; Ret		**2nd**	**289**
2015	Moto2	Kalex	QAT; 6	AME; 8	ARG; 4	SPA; Ret	FRA; Ret	ITA; Ret	CAT; 12	NED; 8	GER; 12	INP; Ret	CZE; 15	GBR; 20	RSM; Ret							15th	72
2015	Moto2	Speed Up														ARA; 11	JPN; 15	AUS; 8	MAL; 12	VAL; 10		15th	72
2016	MotoGP	KTM	QAT	ARG	AME	SPA	FRA	ITA	CAT	NED	GER	AUT	CZE	GBR	RSM	ARA	JPN	AUS	MAL	VAL; Ret		NC	0
2017	MotoGP	KTM	QAT	ARG	AME	SPA	FRA	ITA	CAT	NED	GER; 16	CZE	AUT; 10	GBR	RSM	ARA; 11	JPN	AUS	MAL	VAL; Ret		24th	11
2018	MotoGP	KTM	QAT	ARG	AME	SPA; 10	FRA	ITA	CAT; Ret	NED	GER; DNS	CZE	AUT	GBR	RSM	ARA	THA	JPN	AUS	MAL	VAL	25th	6
2019	MotoGP	KTM	QAT	ARG	AME	SPA	FRA	ITA	CAT	NED	GER	CZE	AUT	GBR	RSM	ARA; 17	THA; Ret	JPN; 14	AUS; Ret	MAL; 15	VAL; 12	26th	7
2020	MotoGP	KTM	SPA	ANC	CZE	AUT	STY	RSM	EMI	CAT	FRA	ARA	TER	EUR	VAL	POR; 17						24th	0
