= Tito Rabat =

Spanish motorcycle racer (born 1989)

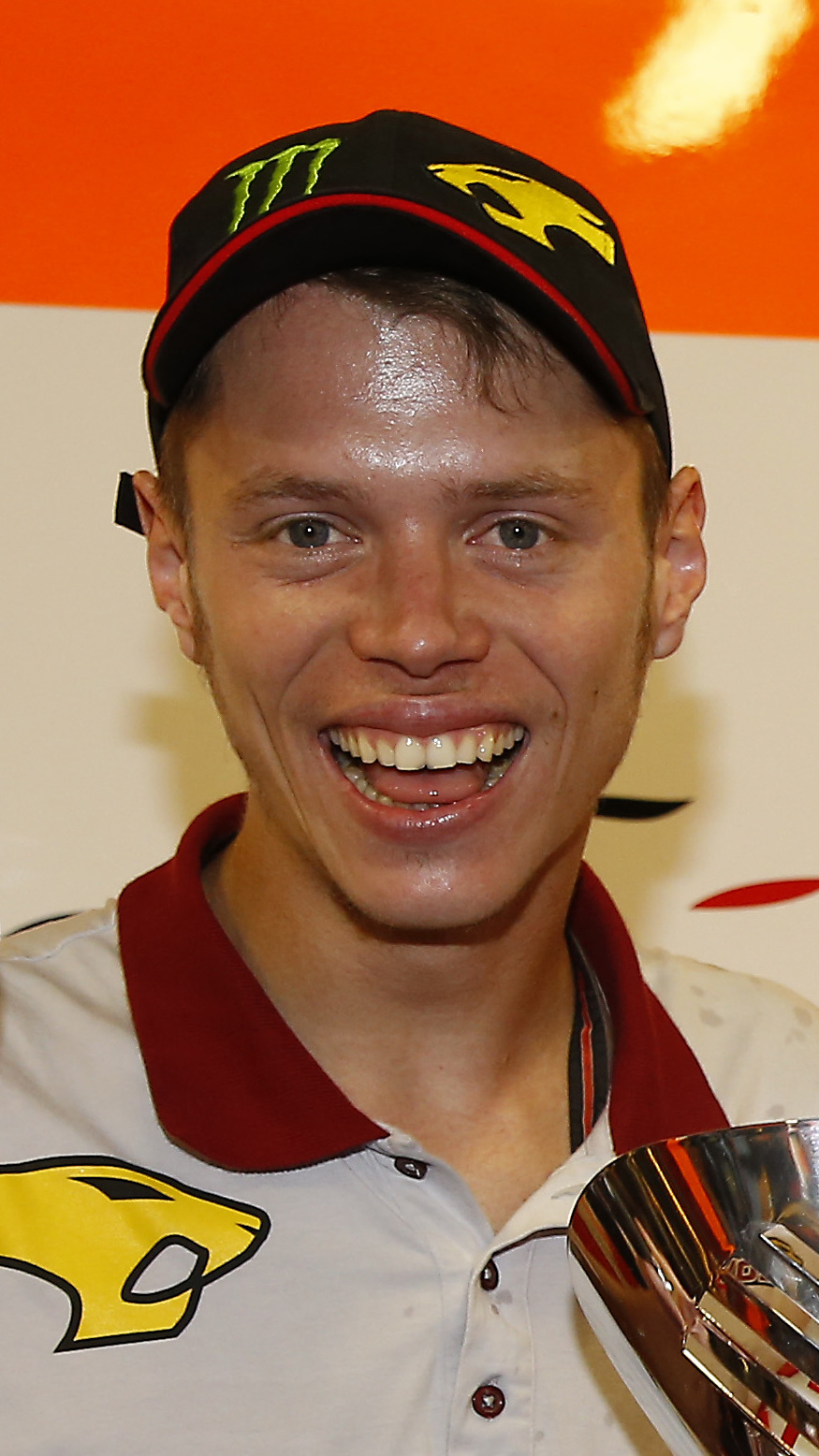
- Rabat at the 2014 Catalan Grand Prix
- Nationality: Spanish
- Born: 25 May 1989 (age 37); Barcelona, Spain
- Current team: Petronas MIE Racing Honda Team
- Bike number: 53
Motorcycle racing career statistics
MotoGP World Championship
Active years	2016–2021
Manufacturers	Honda (2016–2017); Ducati (2018–2021)
Championships	0
2021 championship position	27th (1 pt)
Starts / Wins / Podiums / Poles / F. laps / Points; 79 / 0 / 0 / 0 / 0 / 133
Moto2 World Championship
Active years	2011–2015
Manufacturers	FTR (2011); Kalex (2012–2015)
Championships	1 (2014)
2015 championship position	3rd (231 pts)
Starts / Wins / Podiums / Poles / F. laps / Points; 83 / 13 / 33 / 16 / 11 / 989
125cc World Championship
Active years	2005–2010
Manufacturers	Honda (2005–2007); KTM (2008); Aprilia (2009–2010)
Championships	0
2010 championship position	6th (147 pts)
Starts / Wins / Podiums / Poles / F. laps / Points; 76 / 0 / 3 / 0 / 0 / 318
MotoE World Championship
Active years	2023
Manufacturers	Ducati
Championships	0
2023 championship position	14th (57 pts)
Starts / Wins / Podiums / Poles / F. laps / Points; 15 / 0 / 0 / 0 / 0 / 57
Superbike World Championship
Active years	2021–
Manufacturers	Ducati (2021); Kawasaki (2021–2024); Yamaha (2025); Honda (2025– )
Championships	0
2025 championship position	23rd (9 pts)
Starts / Wins / Podiums / Poles / F. laps / Points; 125 / 0 / 0 / 0 / 0 / 92
British Superbike Championship
Active years	2022–2023
Manufacturers	Honda (2022); Yamaha (2023)
Championships	0
2023 championship position	23rd (16 pts)
Starts / Wins / Podiums / Poles / F. laps / Points; 12 / 0 / 0 / 0 / 0 / 16

Esteve "Tito" Rabat Bergada (born 25 May 1989) is a Spanish motorcycle racer. He is best known for winning the 2014 Moto2 World Championship. Rabat then made the move to MotoGP in 2016 and spent five full-time seasons there, before moving to the Superbike World Championship in 2021. Rabat suffered serious leg injuries in August 2018 after falling in heavy rain during practice for the British round at Silverstone. He was hit by a closely following out-of-control machine. He started racing professionally in 2005, and made his Grand Prix début at that season's 125cc Valencian Grand Prix.

== Career ==
=== 125cc World Championship ===
==== Team BQR (2005–2006) ====
Rabat made his debut on the world championship stage as a wildcard rider in the final race of the 2005 season in Valencia with BQR. For 2006, Rabat entered as a wildcard as a home rider in the Spanish rounds 1 and 7 in Jerez and Barcelona respectively. Following Aleix Espargaró's mid-season move up to the 250cc class, Rabat replaced him from round 8 for the remainder of the season.

==== Repsol Honda (2007) ====
For 2007, Rabat was given a seat in the Repsol Honda 125cc works team, partnering Bradley Smith. He finished the season in 11th place, behind his teammate.

==== Repsol KTM (2008) ====
Following Honda's departure from the 125cc class in a works capacity, the Repsol team switched to KTM bikes. Rabat was retained as rider and partnered young rookie and future World Champion Marc Márquez. Despite starting three more races than his teammate, Rabat finished behind Márquez in the standings by 14 points.

==== Team BQR (2009–2010) ====
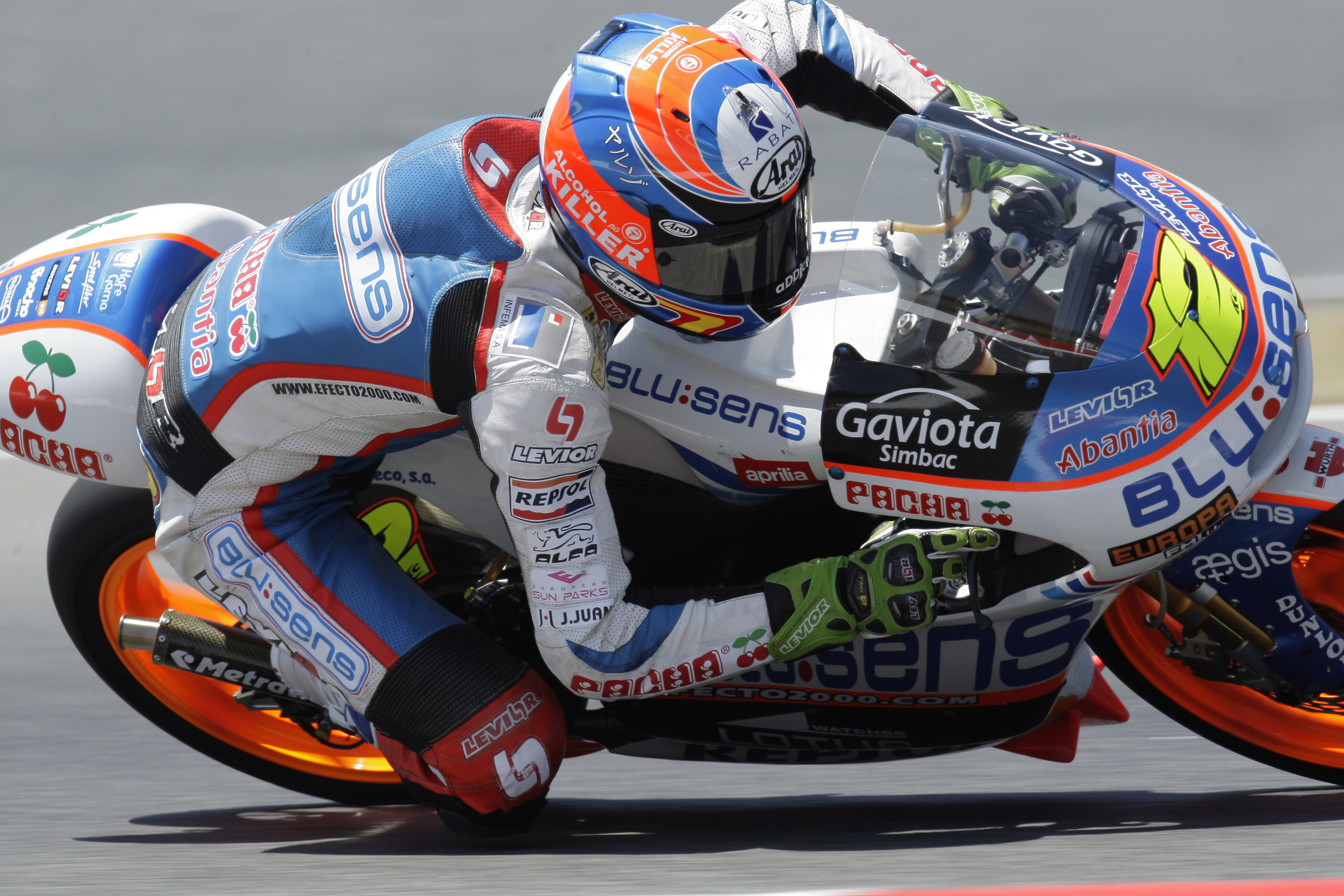
Tito_Rabat_2009_Catalunya

In 2009 and 2010, Rabat returned to BQR, now racing under the Blusens name and using Aprilia motorcycles.

=== Moto2 World Championship ===
==== Team BQR (2011) ====
Rabat moved up to the Moto2 class in 2011 with BQR, riding FTR machinery, finishing a respectable tenth place on the season as a rookie.

==== Pons Racing (2012–2013) ====
===== 2012 =====
For 2012, Rabat switched to Pons Racing and achieved seventh place in the championship.

===== 2013 =====
Rabat's breakthrough year came during the 2013 season. After finishing ninth in the season-opening Qatar Grand Prix, Rabat recorded a second-place finish at the Grand Prix of the Americas; after five previous third places, it was Rabat's best result in Grand Prix racing at the time. The following race, Rabat achieved his first pole position in the Spanish Grand Prix, outpacing all of his rivals by over four tenths of a second. In the race, Rabat led from start to finish, winning by over four seconds from Scott Redding. He added victories later in the season, at the Indianapolis and Malaysian Grands Prix.

==== Marc VDS Racing Team (2014–2015) ====
===== 2014 =====
For the 2014 Moto2 season, Rabat moved to the Marc VDS team and won the season opening race at Qatar ahead of his new teammate Mika Kallio. Over the course of the season, he would take a further six wins and seven podiums, only missing the podium in four races, for a total of 346 points. After finishing third at the Malaysian Grand Prix, he was crowned World Champion, the first for the Marc VDS team, ahead of Kallio.

===== 2015 =====
Remaining in Moto2 for 2015, Rabat attempted to become the first rider since Jorge Lorenzo to retain the intermediate class championship. Rabat did not win a race until Mugello at the end of May. Wins in Aragon and Valencia were not enough for Rabat to retain his title, as he ultimately finished third behind Johann Zarco and Álex Rins.

=== MotoGP World Championship ===
==== EG 0,0 Marc VDS (2016–2017) ====
===== 2016 =====
Rabat moved up to the MotoGP class on a satellite Honda bike for Marc VDS. He recorded his first top-ten finish in Argentina with ninth place, but could not match teammate Jack Miller's performance.

===== 2017 =====
Rabat remained with Marc VDS for 2017, managing only one top-ten finish in the final race of the season. He finished the season with 35 points in 19th position of the rider's championship.

==== Esponsorama Racing (2018–2020) ====
===== 2018 =====
For 2018, Rabat returned again to his previous 125cc and Moto2 team Reale Avintia Racing, partnering Xavier Siméon. At the British Grand Prix Rabat's major crash, being hit by the crashed bike of the closely-following Franco Morbidelli at Stowe corner, was a contributing factor in the decision to cancel the race due to unsafe conditions. As a result of the triple fracture he sustained to his right leg, Rabat missed the remaining seven races of the 2018 season. He finished the season with an identical result to the previous season – 35 points and 19th place in the riders' championship.

===== 2019 =====
Rabat returned in 2019 with Avintia, ultimately outscoring new teammate Karel Abraham and finishing 20th in the riders' championship. During the season, it was announced Rabat had signed with the team for a further two seasons, through the end of 2021.

===== 2020 =====
With the rebranded Esponsorama Racing for 2020, Rabat time partnered Johann Zarco. He had a difficult year, only managing four points finishes and suffering four retirements in the COVID-19 shortened season. He finished the season with ten points in 22nd place of the rider's championship. At the end of the season, it was announced that Esponsorama had elected to buy out Rabat's contract early.

==== Pramac Racing (2021) ====
In 2021, Rabat returned to the MotoGP grid as a replacement rider for the injured Jorge Martín.

=== MotoE World Cup ===
==== Prettl Pramac MotoE (2023) ====
In 2023, Rabat joined Pramac Racing in MotoE.

=== Superbike World Championship ===
==== Barni Racing Team (2021) ====
In March 2021, it was announced that Rabat would ride a Ducati Panigale V4 R with the Barni Racing Team in World Superbike. He parted from Barni before the season end, with the team "citing results".

==== Kawasaki Puccetti Racing (2021-2024) ====
In 2021 before the season end, Tito Rabat joined Kawasaki Puccetti Racing.

==== Yamaha Motoxracing WorldSBK Team (2025) ====
From 2025, Rabat joined the Yamaha Motoxracing WorldSBK Team.

==== Petronas MIE Racing Honda Team (2025) ====
After parting ways with Yamaha Motoxracing WorldSBK Team in mid-season, Rabat was confirmed to join Petronas MIE Racing Honda Team to replace the injured Tarran Mackenzie.

=== ESBK Spanish Superbike Speed Championship ===
==== Honda Laglisse (2022) ====
In March 2022, it was announced that Rabat would take part in the ESBK Spanish Superbike Speed Championship riding for Honda Laglisse. In August 2022, Rabat competed at the Thruxton Circuit race weekend in the British Superbike Championship, filling in for a rider vacancy.

=== British Superbike Championship ===
==== TAG Racing Honda (2022) ====
In August 2022, Rabat competed with TAG Racing, a satellite Honda team, in the British Superbike Championship, replacing Luke Mossey at Thruxton on 13/14 August. Rabat finished his three races in 26th place (last), 28th (last), and finally a DNF. In late August 2022, Rabat attended Cadwell Park for the BSB round, but only rode in the free practice sessions, again in last position, before arrangements with the TAG squad were severed.

In 2023, Rabat was announced as a temporary rider for McAms, a factory Yamaha team, replacing Tim Neave. He attended his first BSB race weekend for McAms Yamaha at Snetterton, finishing in tenth place in Race 3.

== Career statistics ==
=== Grand Prix motorcycle racing ===
==== By season ====
Season	Class	Motorcycle	Team	Race	Win	Podium	Pole	FLap	Pts	Plcd	WCh
2005	125cc	Honda	Wurth Honda BQR	1	0	0	0	0	0	NC	–
2006	125cc	Honda	Honda BQR	11	0	0	0	0	11	23rd	–
2007	125cc	Honda	Repsol Honda 125cc	15	0	1	0	0	74	11th	–
2008	125cc	KTM	Repsol KTM 125cc	16	0	0	0	0	49	14th	–
2009	125cc	Aprilia	Blusens Aprilia	16	0	0	0	0	37	18th	–
2010	125cc	Aprilia	Blusens-STX	17	0	2	0	0	147	6th	–
2011	Moto2	FTR	Blusens-STX	17	0	1	0	0	79	10th	–
2012	Moto2	Kalex	Pons 40 HP Tuenti	17	0	1	0	0	117	7th	–
2013	Moto2	Kalex	Tuenti HP 40	16	3	7	2	3	216	**3rd**	–
2014	Moto2	Kalex	Marc VDS Racing Team	18	7	14	11	5	346	**1st**	1
2015	Moto2	Kalex	EG 0,0 Marc VDS	15	3	10	3	3	231	**3rd**	–
2016	MotoGP	Honda	EG 0,0 Marc VDS	17	0	0	0	0	29	21st	–
2017	MotoGP	Honda	EG 0,0 Marc VDS	18	0	0	0	0	35	19th	–
2018	MotoGP	Ducati	Reale Avintia Racing	11	0	0	0	0	35	19th	–
2019	MotoGP	Ducati	Reale Avintia Racing	17	0	0	0	0	23	20th	–
2020	MotoGP	Ducati	Avintia Esponsorama Racing	14	0	0	0	0	10	22nd	–
2021	MotoGP	Ducati	Pramac Racing	2	0	0	0	0	1	27th	–
2023	MotoE	Ducati	Prettl Pramac MotoE	15	0	0	0	0	57	14th	–
Total				**253**	**13**	**36**	**16**	**11**	**1497**		**1**

==== By class ====
Class	Seasons	1st GP	1st pod	1st win	Race	Win	Podiums	Pole	FLap	Pts	WChmp
125cc	2005–2010	2005 Valencia	2007 China		76	0	3	0	0	318	0
Moto2	2011–2015	2011 Qatar	2011 Indianapolis	2013 Spain	83	13	33	16	11	989	1
MotoGP	2016–2021	2016 Qatar			79	0	0	0	0	133	0
MotoE	2023	2023 France Race 1			15	0	0	0	0	57	0
Total	2005–2021, 2023				**253**	**13**	**36**	**16**	**11**	**1497**	**1**

==== Races by year ====
(key) (Races in bold indicate pole position; races in italics indicate fastest lap)

Year	Class	Bike	1	2	3	4	5	6	7	8	9	10	11	12	13	14	15	16	17	18	19	Pos	Pts
2005	125cc	Honda	SPA	POR	CHN	FRA	ITA	CAT	NED	GBR	GER	CZE	JPN	MAL	QAT	AUS	TUR	VAL; 24				NC	0
2006	125cc	Honda	SPA; 30	QAT	TUR	CHN	FRA	ITA	CAT; Ret	NED; 25	GBR; Ret	GER; 31	CZE; Ret	MAL; 12	AUS; Ret	JPN; 12	POR; 17	VAL; 13				23rd	11
2007	125cc	Honda	QAT; 8	SPA; Ret	TUR; 14	CHN; 3	FRA	ITA	CAT; 12	GBR; Ret	NED; 13	GER; 12	CZE; 11	RSM; 11	POR; 11	JPN; Ret	AUS; 5	MAL; 15	VAL; 6			11th	74
2008	125cc	KTM	QAT; 24	SPA; 12	POR; Ret	CHN; 11	FRA; 17	ITA; 25	CAT; DNS	GBR; 11	NED; 6	GER; DSQ	CZE; 13	RSM; 9	INP; Ret	JPN; Ret	AUS; 7	MAL; Ret	VAL; 10			14th	49
2009	125cc	Aprilia	QAT; 10	JPN; 13	SPA; 12	FRA; 11	ITA; 16	CAT; 12	NED; Ret	GER; Ret	GBR; Ret	CZE; Ret	INP; 20	RSM; Ret	POR; 7	AUS; Ret	MAL; 7	VAL; Ret				18th	37
2010	125cc	Aprilia	QAT; 7	SPA; 3	FRA; 7	ITA; 7	GBR; 9	NED; Ret	CAT; Ret	GER; 4	CZE; 3	INP; 5	RSM; 7	ARA; 7	JPN; 6	MAL; 7	AUS; 6	POR; Ret	VAL; 6			6th	147
2011	Moto2	FTR	QAT; 14	SPA; 15	POR; 10	FRA; 21	CAT; 7	GBR; 6	NED; 7	ITA; 16	GER; Ret	CZE; 7	INP; 3	RSM; 11	ARA; 16	JPN; 9	AUS; Ret	MAL; 11	VAL; Ret			10th	79
2012	Moto2	Kalex	QAT; 4	SPA; 28	POR; 24	FRA; 10	CAT; 4	GBR; 13	NED; 4	GER; 12	ITA; Ret	INP; 11	CZE; 10	RSM; 5	ARA; 11	JPN; 3	MAL; 9	AUS; 7	VAL; 10			7th	117
2013	Moto2	Kalex	QAT; 9	AME; 2	**SPA**; 1	FRA; 22	ITA; 13	CAT; 2	NED; 5	GER; 13	INP; 1	CZE; 7	GBR; 4	RSM; 3	ARA; 2	**MAL**; 1	AUS; 8	JPN; DNS	VAL; 5			3rd	216
2014	Moto2	Kalex	**QAT**; 1	**AME**; 2	**ARG**; 1	SPA; 4	FRA; 3	**ITA**; 1	**CAT**; 1	**NED**; 8	GER; 4	INP; 4	**CZE**; 1	GBR; 1	RSM; 1	ARA; 2	**JPN**; 3	**AUS**; 3	**MAL**; 3	**VAL**; 2		1st	346
2015	Moto2	Kalex	QAT; Ret	AME; 4	ARG; 12	**SPA**; 3	FRA; 2	ITA; 1	CAT; 3	NED; 2	GER; Ret	INP; 5	CZE; 2	GBR; 3	RSM; 2	**ARA**; 1	JPN; DNS	AUS; DNS	MAL	**VAL**; 1		3rd	231
2016	MotoGP	Honda	QAT; 15	ARG; 9	AME; 13	SPA; 18	FRA; Ret	ITA; DNS	CAT; 14	NED; 11	GER; 16	AUT; 14	CZE; 10	GBR; 15	RSM; 17	ARA; Ret	JPN; 14	AUS; 16	MAL; 18	VAL; 17		21st	29
2017	MotoGP	Honda	QAT; 15	ARG; 12	AME; 13	SPA; Ret	FRA; 11	ITA; 11	CAT; 15	NED; 12	GER; 18	CZE; 17	AUT; 19	GBR; 12	RSM; Ret	ARA; 15	JPN; 15	AUS; 16	MAL; 18	VAL; 10		19th	35
2018	MotoGP	Ducati	QAT; 11	ARG; 7	AME; 8	SPA; 14	FRA; Ret	ITA; 13	CAT; Ret	NED; 16	GER; 13	CZE; Ret	AUT; 11	GBR; C	RSM	ARA	THA	JPN	AUS	MAL	VAL	19th	35
2019	MotoGP	Ducati	QAT; 19	ARG; Ret	AME; 15	SPA; 15	FRA; Ret	ITA; Ret	CAT; 9	NED; 16	GER; 11	CZE; 16	AUT; Ret	GBR; 16	RSM; 13	ARA; 15	THA; 17	JPN; DNS	AUS; Ret	MAL	VAL; 11	20th	23
2020	MotoGP	Ducati	SPA; 14	ANC; 11	CZE; 16	AUT; 16	STY; 21	RSM; Ret	EMI; Ret	CAT; 15	FRA; Ret	ARA; 20	TER; 14	EUR; Ret	VAL; 17	POR; 18						22nd	10
2021	MotoGP	Ducati	QAT	DOH	POR	SPA; 18	FRA; 15	ITA	CAT	GER	NED	STY	AUT	GBR	ARA	RSM	AME	EMI	ALR	VAL		27th	1
2023	MotoE	Ducati	FRA1; 6	FRA2; 16	ITA1; 12	ITA2; 13	GER1; 7	GER2; 14	NED1; 8	NED2; Ret	GBR1; 11	GBR2; Ret	AUT1; 10	AUT2; 14	CAT1; EX	CAT2; Ret	RSM1; Ret	RSM2; 8				14th	57

=== Superbike World Championship ===
==== By season ====
Season	Motorcycle	Team	Race	Win	Podium	Pole	FLap	Pts	Plcd
2021	Ducati Panigale V4 R	Barni Racing Team	24	0	0	0	0	53	16th
2021	Kawasaki Ninja ZX-10RR	Kawasaki Puccetti Racing	8	0	0	0	0	53	16th
2022	Kawasaki Ninja ZX-10RR	Kawasaki Puccetti Racing	3	0	0	0	0	0	NC
2023	Kawasaki Ninja ZX-10RR	Kawasaki Puccetti Racing	21	0	0	0	0	8	22nd
2024	Kawasaki Ninja ZX-10RR	Kawasaki Puccetti Racing	36	0	0	0	0	22	20th
2025	Yamaha YZF-R1	Yamaha Motoxracing WorldSBK Team	15	0	0	0	0	9	23rd
2025	Honda CBR1000RR	Petronas MIE Racing Honda Team	18	0	0	0	0	9	23rd
Total			**125**	**0**	**0**	**0**	**0**	**92**	

==== Races by year ====
(key) (Races in bold indicate pole position, races in italics indicate fastest lap)

Year	Bike	1			2			3			4			5			6			7			8			9			10			11			12			13			Pos	Pts
Year	Bike	R1	SR	R2	R1	SR	R2	R1	SR	R2	R1	SR	R2	R1	SR	R2	R1	SR	R2	R1	SR	R2	R1	SR	R2	R1	SR	R2	R1	SR	R2	R1	SR	R2	R1	SR	R2	R1	SR	R2	Pos	Pts
2021	Ducati	SPA; Ret	SPA; 14	SPA; Ret	POR; 9	POR; 12	POR; 10	ITA; 15	ITA; 14	ITA; 14	GBR; Ret	GBR; Ret	GBR; 14	NED; Ret	NED; 11	NED; 11	CZE; Ret	CZE; Ret	CZE; 13	SPA; 12	SPA; Ret	SPA; 11	FRA; 14	FRA; 15	FRA; 15	SPA	SPA	SPA	SPA	SPA	SPA										16th	53
2021	Kawasaki																															POR; 13	POR; 14	POR; Ret	ARG; 11	ARG; 12	ARG; 12	INA; Ret	INA; C	INA; 13	16th	53
2022	Kawasaki	SPA	SPA	SPA	NED	NED	NED	POR	POR	POR	ITA; 16	ITA; 16	ITA; 17	GBR	GBR	GBR	CZE	CZE	CZE	FRA	FRA	FRA	SPA	SPA	SPA	POR	POR	POR	ARG	ARG	ARG	INA	INA	INA	AUS	AUS	AUS				NC	0
2023	Kawasaki	AUS	AUS	AUS	INA	INA	INA	NED	NED	NED	SPA	SPA	SPA	EMI; 19	EMI; 16	EMI; Ret	GBR; 16	GBR; 20	GBR; Ret	ITA; 16	ITA; 20	ITA; Ret	CZE; 15	CZE; 15	CZE; 18	FRA	FRA	FRA	SPA; Ret	SPA; 17	SPA; 18	POR; 19	POR; 18	POR; 16	JER; 11	JER; 15	JER; 14				22nd	8
2024	Kawasaki	AUS; 18	AUS; 19	AUS; 16	SPA; 21	SPA; 16	SPA; 15	NED; Ret	NED; Ret	NED; 15	ITA; 19	ITA; 15	ITA; 14	GBR; 17	GBR; 18	GBR; 19	CZE; 17	CZE; 15	CZE; 14	POR; 14	POR; 16	POR; 17	FRA; Ret	FRA; 17	FRA; 14	ITA; Ret	ITA; 10	ITA; 10	SPA; Ret	SPA; 17	SPA; 17	POR; 10	POR; 17	POR; Ret	SPA; 16	SPA; 15	SPA; NC				20th	22
2025	Yamaha	AUS; Ret	AUS; 16	AUS; 17	POR; 15	POR; 18	POR; Ret	NED; 14	NED; Ret	NED; 20	ITA; Ret	ITA; 20	ITA; Ret	CZE; 17	CZE; 20	CZE; Ret	EMI	EMI	EMI																						23rd	9
2025	Honda																			GBR; Ret	GBR; 19	GBR; 19	HUN; 17	HUN; Ret	HUN; 15	FRA; 14	FRA; 18	FRA; Ret	ARA; 17	ARA; Ret	ARA; 17	POR; 13	POR; 20	POR; 16	SPA; 18	SPA; 18	SPA; 16				23rd	9

=== British Superbike Championship ===
==== By season ====
Season	Class	Motorcycle	Team	No.	Race	Win	Podium	Pole	FLap	Pts	Plcd
2022	SBK	Honda	TAG Racing	53	3	0	0	0	0	0	NC
2023	SBK	Yamaha	McAMS Yamaha	53	9	0	0	0	0	16	23rd
Total					**12**	**0**	**0**	**0**	**0**	**16**	

==== By year ====
Year	Bike	1			2			3			4			5			6			7			8			9			10			11			Pos	Pts
Year	Bike	R1	R2	R3	R1	R2	R3	R1	R2	R3	R1	R2	R3	R1	R2	R3	R1	R2	R3	R1	R2	R3	R1	R2	R3	R1	R2	R3	R1	R2	R3	R1	R2	R3	Pos	Pts
2022	Honda	SIL	SIL	SIL	OUL	OUL	OUL	DON	DON	DON	KNO	KNO	KNO	BRH	BRH	BRH	THR; 26	THR; 28	THR; Ret	CAD; WD	CAD; WD	CAD; WD	SNE	SNE	SNE	OUL	OUL	OUL	DON	DON	DON	BRH	BRH	BRH	NC	0
2023	Yamaha	SIL	SIL	SIL	OUL	OUL	OUL	DON	DON	DON	KNO	KNO	KNO	SNE; 10	SNE; 13	SNE; 10	BRH; 21	BRH; Ret	BRH; 15	THR; Ret	THR; 19	THR; Ret	CAD	CAD	CAD	OUL	OUL	OUL	DON	DON	DON	BRH	BRH	BRH	23rd	16

=== ESBK results (Campeonato de España de Superbikes) ===
==== By year ====
Year	Bike	1		2		3		4		5		6		7		Pos	Pts
Year	Bike	R1	R2	R1	R2	R1	R2	R1	R2	R1	R2	R1	R2	R1	R2	Pos	Pts
2022	Honda	JER1; 2	JER1; 3	VAL; 1	VAL; 1	EST; 4	EST; 2	BAR; 3	BAR; 5	ARA; 2	ARA; 2	NAV; 2	NAV; 2	JER2; 3	JER2; 2	1st	262
