= List of Superbike World Championship racers =

This is a list of racers that took part in one or more Superbike World Championship races, since the championship was established in 1988. Wildcard riders are included in the list.

The list is accurate up to November 1, 2019. All stats from

_{Key
Present = racing in the 2025 SBK season}

== A ==
Rider	Years active	Races	Wins	2nd pl.	3rd pl.	Titles.	Ref
(Japan) Norick Abe	2005–2006	47	0	0	0	0	
(Czech Republic) Karel Abraham	2016	24	0	0	0	0	
(United States) James Adamo	1989–1991	6	0	0	0	0	
(Switzerland) Dominique Aegerter	2023-2025	91	0	1	1	0	
(Australia) Mark Aitchison	2011–2013	53	0	0	0	0	
(Japan) Kosuke Akiyoshi	2013	2	0	0	0	0	
(Qatar) Mashel Al Naimi	2007	2	0	0	0	0	
(Qatar) Talal Al Naimi	2005–2006	4	0	0	0	0	
(Qatar) Saeed Al Sulaiti	2016	24	0	0	0	0	
(Italy) Lorenzo Alfonsi	2005–2006, 2012	23	0	0	0	0	
(Australia) Glenn Allerton	2013–2014	6	0	0	0	0	
(Spain) Javier Alviz	2015	4	0	0	0	0	
(Spain) Daniel Amatriain	1990–1993	80	0	0	1	0	
(Sweden) Anders Andersson	1988–1990	61	0	0	0	0	
(Italy) Alessandro Andreozzi	2014, 2017–2018	33	0	0	0	0	
(United Kingdom) Simon Andrews	2009–2010	4	0	0	0	0	
(San Marino) Alex de Angelis	2016–2017	41	0	1	0	0	
(Italy) Igor Antonelli	2000	16	0	0	0	0	
(Italy) Alessandro Antonello	1999–2002	54	0	0	0	0	
(Japan) Haruchika Aoki	2000	16	0	0	0	0	
(Japan) Takuma Aoki	1994–1996	6	1	0	0	0	
(Japan) Hiroshi Aoyama	2012	27	0	0	0	0	
(Japan) Shuhei Aoyama	2008	28	0	0	0	0	
(Japan) Shuja Arai	2001	2	0	0	0	0	
(Japan) Toshiyuki Arakaki	1993	6	0	0	0	0	
(Japan) Tetsuro Arata	1989	4	0	0	0	0	
(Australia) Benn Archibald	1992–93, 1995–97	9	0	0	0	0	
(United States) Richard Arnaiz	1989, 1992	12	0	0	0	0	
(Australia) Nigel Arnold	2001	2	0	0	0	0	
(Australia) Kim Ashkenazi	2001	2	0	0	0	0	
(United States) John Ashmead	1990	1	0	0	0	0	
(Italy) Redamo Assirelli	1997–2000, 2002	10	0	0	0	0	

== B ==
Rider	Years active	Races	Wins	2nd pl.	3rd pl.	Titles	Ref
(Poland) Adam Badziak	2005	4	0	0	0	0	
(Italy) Ayrton Badovini	2008–2009, 2011–2015, 2017	167	0	0	2	0	
(Italy) Matteo Baiocco	2009–2012, 2014–2016	89	0	0	0	0	
(Italy) Lorenzo Baldassarri	2023, 2026	69	0	0	2	0	
(United States) Mike Baldwin	1989	12	0	1	0	0	
(Spain) Hector Barbera	2019	4	0	0	0	0	
(Spain) Santiago Barragan	2011, 2015	20	0	0	0	0	
(France) Sylvain Barrier	2013–2016, 2019–2020	47	0	0	0	0	
(Brazil) Alex Barros	2006	24	1	4	1	0	
(Germany) Markus Barth	2000	17	0	0	0	0	
(Italy) Walter Bartolini	2006	2	0	0	0	0	
(Italy) Franco Battaini	2006	9	0	0	0	0	
(Austria) Martin Bauer	2007–08	4	0	0	0	0	
(Spain) Alvaro Bautista	2019–Present	219	63	26	27	2	
(Australia) Troy Bayliss	1997–1998, 2000–2002, 2006–2008, 2015	156	52	29	13	3	
(France) Loris Baz	2012–2014, 2018–2023	209	2	11	7	0	
(United States) J.D. Beach	2019	2	0	0	0	0	
(Australia) Daryl Beattie	1989, 1990	6	0	0	0	0	
(United States) Cameron Beaubier	2016	2	0	0	0	0	
(United States) Michael Beck	2008	2	0	0	0	0	
(Netherlands) Harry van Beek	2006	2	0	0	0	0	
(France) Maxime Berger	2011–2012	49	0	0	0	0	
(Norway) Carl Berthelsen	2004	4	0	0	0	0	
(Italy) Max Biaggi	2007–2012, 2015	159	21	27	23	2	
(Italy) Fabio Biliotti	1989, 1990	10	0	0	0	0	
(Italy) Paolo Blora	1998, 2000–2005	39	0	0	0	0	
(France) Pierre Bolle	1989	6	0	0	0	0	
(Australia) Renè Bongers	1989–1990	6	0	0	0	0	
(France) Bruno Bonhuil	1990-1992	30	0	0	0	0	
(France) Denis Bonoris	1993	12	0	0	0	0	
(Italy) Piergiorgio Bontempi	1991–1998, 2004	195	0	1	2	0	
(Italy) Marco Borciani	2000–2007	163	0	0	0	0	
(Spain) Juan Borja	2000–2003	91	0	1	1	0	
(Netherlands) Kervin Bos	2014	2	0	0	0	0	
(United States) Ben Bostrom	1998–2002, 2005	104	7	4	6	0	
(United States) Eric Bostrom	1999, 2001–2003	14	0	0	0	0	
(France) Christophe Bouheben	1988	14	0	2	0	0	
(Greece) Ioannis Boustas	1996	20	0	0	0	0	
(Germany) Stefan Bradl	2017	18	0	0	0	0	
(France) Laurent Brian	2005	2	0	0	0	0	
(United Kingdom) Thomas ''Tommy'' Bridewell	2008, 2010, 2019, 2024	14	0	0	0	0	
(Italy) Norino Brignola	2005–2007, 2012	25	0	0	0	0	
(Canada) Yves Brisson	1989, 1991	4	0	1	0	0	
(Italy) Massimo Broccoli	1989, 1991–93	20	0	0	0	0	
(Australia) Josh Brookes	2006–07, 2010, 2012, 2016–2017	63	0	0	0	0	
(Australia) Damon Buckmaster	1996–97	4	0	0	0	0	
(Italy) Nicolò Bulega	2024–Present	51	14	20	3	0	
(United Kingdom) Roger Burnett	1988–89	27	0	1	2	0	
(Italy) Giovanni Bussei	1999–2001, 2003–2007	110	0	0	0	0	
(United Kingdom) Shane Byrne	2002–2003, 2009–2010	60	2	1	0	0	

== C ==
Rider	Years active	Races	Wins	2nd pl.	3rd pl.	Titles	Ref
(Italy) Luca Cadalora	2000	2	0	0	0	0	
(Italy) Cristian Caliumi	2002	2	0	0	0	0	
(United Kingdom) Leon Camier	2009–2019	223	0	2	7	0	
(Slovenia) Berto Camlek	2001, 2004, 2006	8	0	0	0	0	
(Italy) Matteo Campana	2001	4	0	0	0	0	
(Australia) Malcolm Campbell	1988–92,1998	37	0	3	2	0	
(Italy) Niccolo Canepa	2008, 2012–2016, 2018	79	0	0	0	0	
(Italy) Stefano Caracchi	1990	24	0	0	0	0	
(Spain) José Luis Cardoso	2005	20	0	0	0	0	
(Spain) Carlos Cardús	1994	2	0	0	0	0	
(Portugal) Luis Carreira	2008	2	0	0	0	0	
(United Kingdom) Alan Carter	1994	2	0	0	0	0	
(Italy) Paolo Casoli	1994–1996	48	0	1	1	0	
(Italy) Samuele Cavalieri	2019–2021	31	0	0	0	0	
(France) Stéphane Chambon	1996, 2001	33	0	0	0	0	
(United States) Doug Chandler	1989–90, 1996–98, 2001–02	14	0	2	3	0	
(Spain) Carlos Checa	2008–2013	150	24	11	14	1	
(Spain) David Checa	2005, 2008–2009	50	0	0	0	0	
(Italy) Pierfrancesco Chili	1995–2006	276	17	18	26	0	
(Thailand) Chanon Chumjai	2015	2	0	0	0	0	
(Czech Republic) Miloš Čihák	2005–09	10	0	0	0	0	
(Canada) Linnley Clarke	1991	5	0	1	0	0	
(Italy) Ivan Clementi	2002–2006, 2013	124	0	0	0	0	
(France) Jules Cluzel	2013	27	0	1	0	0	
(Netherlands) Andre Coers	2000	2	0	0	0	0	
(Italy) Luca Conforti	2005, 2007, 2009	7	0	0	0	0	
(Australia) Craig Connell	1996–99	8	0	0	0	0	
(Italy) Simone Conti	2003	2	0	0	0	0	
(United Kingdom) Richard Cooper	2009	2	0	0	0	0	
(Italy) Alessio Corradi	2005	2	0	0	0	0	
(Australia) Troy Corser	1992,1994–96, 1998–01, 2003–11	377	33	47	50	2	
(Germany) Sandro Cortese	2019–2020	43	0	0	0	0	
(Italy) Claudio Corti	2012, 2014	21	0	0	0	0	
(Australia) Craig Coxhell	2004	2	0	0	0	0	
(New Zealand) Simon Crafar	1990,1992–1997, 2000	123	0	4	6	0	
(Australia) Martin Craggill	1995–1997, 1999, 2001	44	0	0	0	0	
(United Kingdom) John Crawford	2000	2	0	0	0	0	
(Canada) Steve Crevier	1989,1991,1997	11	0	0	1	0	
(Italy) Stefano Cruciani	2004–05, 2007	8	0	0	0	0	
(United Kingdom) Cal Crutchlow	2008, 2010	30	3	2	6	0	
(Australia) Alex Cudlin	2014	2	0	0	0	0	
(Australia) Steven Cutting	2003	2	0	0	0	0	

== D ==
Rider	Years active	Races	Wins	2nd pl.	3rd pl.	Titles	Ref
(France) Jehan d'Orgeix	1992	8	0	0	0	0	
(France) Julien Da Costa	2005	2	0	0	0	0	
(Norway) Sundby Dag Steinar	2003	2	0	0	0	0	
(Spain) José David De Gea	2006	2	0	0	0	0	
(United Kingdom) Chaz Davies	2012–2021	268	32	38	29	0	
(Italy) Giancarlo De Matteis	2003–2004	10	0	0	0	0	
(Italy) Raffaele De Rosa	2012, 2016–2017	26	0	0	0	0	
(Italy) Massimo De Silvestro	2000	14	0	0	0	0	
(France) Valentin Debise	2020	6	0	0	0	0	
(Italy) Alessandro Delbianco	2019, 2021–2022, 2024	51	0	0	0	0	
(France) Eric Delcamp	1988	11	0	1	0	0	
(France) Jean-Marc Delétang	1990, 1992–93, 1996–98	40	0	0	0	0	
(Italy) Valerio Destefanis	1992–95	32	0	0	0	0	
(Italy) Ferdinando Di Maso	2001	23	0	0	0	0	
(France) Guillaume Dietrich	2007	2	0	0	0	0	
(United Kingdom) Jake Dixon	2017, 2026	13	0	0	0	0	
(Australia) Michael Doohan	1988	7	3	0	0	0	
(Australia) Scott Doohan	1991–92	12	0	0	0	0	
(Canada) Tommy Douglas	1988–90	13	0	0	0	0	
(Australia) Michael Dowson	1988–90	13	2	3	1	0	
(Czech Republic) Jiri Drazdak	2005–2008	18	0	0	0	0	
(Canada) Miguel Duhamel	1995,1997	10	0	0	3	0	
(Republic of Ireland) Joey Dunlop	1988	6	0	0	1	0	
(United Kingdom) Robert Dunlop	1988	24	0	0	1	0	
(France) Stephane Duterne	2004	4	0	0	0	0	
(Netherlands) Maarten Duyzers	2000	2	0	0	0	0	

== E ==
Rider	Years active	Races	Wins	2nd pl.	3rd pl.	Titles	Ref
(United Kingdom) Stuart Easton	2009	2	0	0	0	0	
(United States) Colin Edwards	1995–02	175	31	24	20	2	
(South Africa) Jonnie Ekerold	1999–00	19	0	0	0	0	
(Spain) Toni Elias	2013–2014	32	0	0	0	0	
(United Kingdom) Dean Ellison	2001–03, 2007	33	0	0	0	0	
(United Kingdom) James Ellison	2004, 2008, 2009	8	0	0	0	0	
(Australia) David Emmerson	1997	8	0	0	0	0	
(United Kingdom) Sean Emmett	1996–99, 2001, 2003	28	0	0	0	0	
(Turkey) Yunus Ercelik	2013	2	0	0	0	0	
(Switzerland) Michel Ernst	1993	18	0	0	0	0	
(United States) Danny Eslick	2013	1	0	0	0	0	

== F ==
Rider	Years active	Races	Wins	2nd pl.	3rd pl.	Titles	Ref
(Italy) Marino Fabbri	1988–1990	21	0	0	0	0	
(Italy) Michel Fabrizio	2006–2015	219	4	12	19	0	
(Italy) Giancarlo Falappa	1989–1994	107	16	6	8	0	
(Australia) Daniel Falzon	2018	2	0	0	0	0	
(Republic of Ireland) Mark Farmer	1988,1993–1994	7	0	0	0	0	
(Spain) Oriol Fernandez	2000	2	0	0	0	0	
(Italy) Virginio Ferrari	1988,1991–1995	37	0	0	0	0	
(United Kingdom) Carl Fogarty	1990–2000	220	59	33	17	4	
(Spain) Javier ''Xavi" Fores	2011, 2013–2018	91	0	2	4	0	
(France) Fabien Foret	2006, 2014	29	0	0	0	0	
(Italy) Serafino Foti	1994, 2001–2003	53	0	0	0	0	
(Spain) Sergio Fuertes	2003–2006, 2008	41	0	0	0	0	
(Japan) Katsuaki Fujiwara	1995,1997, 1999–2000	59	0	0	2	0	
(Japan) Norihiko Fujiwara	1994–1997	8	0	0	0	0	
(Italy) Fabrizio Furlan	1991–1994	49	0	0	0	0	

== G ==
Rider	Years active	Races	Wins	2nd pl.	3rd pl.	Titles	Ref
(Spain) Sergio Gadea	2012	1	0	0	0	0	
(United States) Jake Gagne	2017–2018	29	0	0	0	0	
(Italy) Michele Gallina	1995, 2005	8	0	0	0	0	
(Spain) David García	2003–2004	17	0	0	0	0	
(Australia) Remy Gardner	2023-Present	131	0	0	2	0	
(Spain) Juan Garriga	1993	8	0	1	0	0	
(Italy) Flavio Gentile	2009	1	0	0	0	0	
(South Africa) Greg Gildenhuys	2015	2	0	0	0	0	
(Australia) Shawn Giles	1991–1992,1994–1999	24	0	0	0	0	
(France) Sébastien Gimbert	2003–2006, 2008	72	0	0	0	0	
(Italy) Davide Giugliano	2011–2018	124	0	9	5	0	
(Australia) Anthony Gobert	1994–1996, 1999–2000, 2006	57	8	3	5	0	
(Australia) Peter Goddard	1989–1991,1994–2002	106	2	2	0	0	
(Italy) Ivan Goi	2006, 2014	8	0	0	0	0	
(Canada) Gary Goodfellow	1988–89	14	1	0	2	0	
(Netherlands) Jurgen van den Goorbergh	2005	2	0	0	0	0	
(Italy) Alessandro Gramigni	1998–2001, 2003, 2005	87	0	0	0	0	
(Germany) Ernst Gschwender	1988–1993	54	0	0	0	0	
(Italy) Vittoriano Guareschi	1999–00	49	0	0	2	0	
(France) Jeremy Guarnoni	2014, 2017–2018	28	0	0	0	0	
(Canada) Jacques Guenette Jr.	1991	2	0	0	0	0	
(France) Sylvain Guintoli	2009–2017	174	9	18	15	1	
(Switzerland) Yann Gyger	2002	4	0	0	0	0	

== H ==
Rider	Years active	Races	Wins	2nd pl.	3rd pl.	Titles	Ref
(United States) Jamie Hacking	1998–99, 2009	10	0	0	0	0	
(Japan) Kensuke Haga	1998	2	0	0	0	0	
(Japan) Noriyuki Haga	1994–2000, 2002, 2004–2011, 2013	314	43	41	32	0	
(New Zealand) Christopher Haldane	1992–1993	4	0	0	0	0	
(United States) Mike Hale	1995–1997	52	0	0	1	0	
(Japan) Tadaaki Hanamura	1988,1990–1991	6	0	0	0	0	
(Czech Republic) Karel Hanika	2018	2	0	0	0	0	
(United Kingdom) Leon Haslam	2003–04, 2008–2023	325	5	16	24	0	
(Austria) Christian Hausle	1997	2	0	0	0	0	
(Norway) Oddgeir Havnen	2000	2	0	0	0	0	
(United States) Nicky Hayden	2002, 2016–2017	38	1	0	3	0	
(United States) Roger Lee Hayden	2010, 2013	27	0	0	0	0	
(United Kingdom) James Haydon	1997–2001, 2003	52	0	0	0	0	
(United Kingdom) Mark Heckles	2002–2003	24	0	0	0	0	
(Australia) Troy Herfoss	2018–2019	4	0	0	0	0	
(Colombia) Yonny Hernandez	2018	17	0	0	0	0	
(United States) Josh Herrin	2018	2	0	0	0	0	
(United Kingdom) Peter Hickman	2012, 2019, 2022	11	0	0	0	0	
(United Kingdom) Tommy Hill	2006, 2009	16	0	0	0	0	
(United Kingdom) Steve Hislop	1995, 1998–02	35	0	0	1	0	
(United Kingdom) Dennis Hobbs	2005	2	0	0	0	0	
(United Kingdom) Neil Hodgson	1996–1998, 2000–2003	147	16	15	10	1	
(Germany) Alexander Hofmann	2002	2	0	0	0	0	
(Switzerland) Andreas Hofmann	1988–93,1995–1996	45	0	0	0	0	
(United States) Jake Holden	2012	2	0	0	0	0	
(Australia) Russell Holland	2008	14	0	0	0	0	
(France) Ludovic Holon	2000–01	17	0	0	0	0	
(Australia) Josh Hook	2016	7	0	0	0	0	
(Canada) John K. Hopperstad	1991						
(United States) John Hopkins	2009, 2011–2012	29	0	0	0	0	

== I ==
Rider	Years active	Races	Wins	2nd pl.	3rd pl.	Titles	Ref
(Italy) Vittorio Iannuzzo	2003, 2006–2010, 2013	120	0	0	0	0	
(United Kingdom) Christian Iddon	2014	16	0	0	0	0	
(United Kingdom) Paul Iddon	1988–1989	21	0	0	0	0	
(France) Patrick Igoa	1989,1992	14	0	0	0	0	
(Italy) Mario Innamorati	1996,1998	8	0	0	0	0	
(United Kingdom) Kenny Irons	1988	4	0	0	0	0	
(Spain) Martin Benito Isaac	2003	2	0	0	0	0	
(South Africa) Lance Isaacs	1999–2000	51	0	0	0	0	
(Japan) Shinichi Ito	1998–1999, 2001	6	0	0	0	0	
(Japan) Kenihiro Iwahashi	1988–1989,1994	6	0	2	0	0	
(Japan) Hitoyasu Izutsu	1999–2003	30	2	1	1	0	

== J ==
Rider	Years active	Races	Wins	2nd pl.	3rd pl.	Titles	Ref
(United States) PJ Jacobsen	2018	22	0	0	0	0	
(Switzerland) Claude Alain Jaggi	2000	12	0	0	0	0	
(United States) Jamie James	1990–1991	11	0	3	0	0	
(United Kingdom) David Jefferies	1993–1996	26	0	0	0	0	
(United States) Scott Jensen	2008	2	0	0	0	0	
(Slovenia) Igor Jerman	1997–2000	103	0	0	0	0	
(Czech Republic) Ondrej Jezek	2017–2018	38	0	0	0	0	
(Australia) David Johnson	2012	3	0	0	0	0	
(United Kingdom) Craig Jones	2006	24	0	0	0	0	
(Australia) Mike Jones	2016	2	0	0	0	0	
(Australia) Trevor Jordan	1990–1994	10	0	0	0	0	
(New Zealand) Russel Josiah	1989–1992	8	0	0	0	0	

== K ==
Rider	Years active	Races	Wins	2nd pl.	3rd pl.	Titles	Ref
(Thailand) Sahustchai Kaewjaturaporn	2016	2	0	0	0	0	
(Japan) Yukio Kagayama	2001, 2003, 2005–2009	120	4	6	6	0	
(Japan) Manabu Kamada	2000	2	0	0	0	0	
(Slovakia) Vladimir Karban	1999–2000	40	0	0	0	0	
(Switzerland) Roger Kellenberger	1991–1996, 1999	34	0	0	0	0	
(Belgium) Didier van Keymeulen	2006	2	0	0	0	0	
(United States) Tom Kipp	1989–1991,1995,1997	20	1	0	0	0	
(United Kingdom) Jon Kirkham	2011	2	0	0	0	0	
(Hungary) Viktor Kispataki	2011–2012	4	0	0	0	0	
(Japan) Keiichi Kitagawa	1992–2000	24	1	2	2	0	
(Japan) Ryuichi Kiyonari	2008–2010, 2019	89	3	0	3	0	
(Australia) James Knight	1990–1992	8	0	0	0	0	
(United States) John Kocinski	1996–1997	48	14	7	8	1	
(Finland) Erkka Korpiaho	1997–1998	12	0	0	0	0	
(Switzerland) Randy Krummenacher	2017	18	0	0	0	0	

== L ==
Rider	Years active	Races	Wins	2nd pl.	3rd pl.	Titles	Ref
(France) Régis Laconi	2001, 2003–2009	173	11	7	10	0	
(France) Matthieu Lagrive	2009, 2016	14	0	0	0	0	
(Italy) Fabrizio Lai	2010–2011, 2013	14	0	0	0	0	
(France) Romain Lanusse	2014	4	0	0	0	0	
(Italy) Lorenzo Lanzi	2005–2014	140	3	1	3	0	
(Spain) Joan Lascorz	2011–2012	30	0	0	0	0	
(Republic of Ireland) Eugene Laverty	2011–2014, 2017–2022	248	13	10	12	0	
(France) Christian Lavieille	1990–1993,1997	28	0	0	0	0	
(Spain) Gregorio Lavilla	1994,1996–2003, 2008–2009	188	0	4	8	0	
(United Kingdom) Mason Law	2018	2	0	0	0	0	
(Russia) Vladimir Leonov	2018	3	0	0	0	0	
(Sweden) Christer Lindholm	1989,1991–1997, 1999	87	0	0	0	0	
(Italy) Gianmaria Liverani	1994–1995, 2003–2004	38	0	0	0	0	
(United Kingdom) Matt Llewellyn	1992–1995,1998	21	0	0	0	0	
(United Kingdom) Alex Lowes	2011–Present	335	4	11	31	0	
(United Kingdom) Sam Lowes	2024–Present	45	0	1	0	0	
(United Kingdom) Ian Lowry	2010	6	0	0	0	0	
(Spain) Diego Lozano Ortiz	2008	2	0	0	0	0	
(Italy) Mauro Lucchiari	1992–1995, 1999, 2005	109	2	1	4	0	
(Italy) Marco Lucchinelli	1988–1989	19	2	1	1	0	
(Sweden) Alexander Lundh	2012–2013	14	0	0	0	0	
(France) Matthieu Lussiana	2016, 2018	12	0	0	0	0	
(United States) Matt Lynn	2008	4	0	0	0	0	

== M ==
Rider	Years active	Races	Wins	2nd pl.	3rd pl.	Titles	Ref
(Colombia) Carlos Macias Perdomo	1999	18	0	0	0	0	
(United Kingdom) Niall Mackenzie	1990–1991,1993–1999	29	0	0	0	0	
(Australia) Kevin Magee	1991–1992	8	2	4	1	0	
(France) Lucas Mahias	2016	2	0	0	0	0	
(Italy) Michele Malatesta	1999, 2001–2002	24	0	0	0	0	
(Slovenia) Marjan Malec	2002	2	0	0	0	0	
(France) Florian Marino	2018	2	0	0	0	0	
(Germany) Udo Mark	1988–1994,1996–1998	77	0	0	0	0	
(Netherlands) Michael van der Mark	2015–Present	294	6	13	23	0	
(United Kingdom) Roger Marshall	1988	4	0	0	0	0	
(Australia) Steve Martin	1989–1992,1994–1999, 2001–2007, 2009	182	0	0	5	0	
(Italy) Marco Masetti	2003	2	0	0	0	0	
(United Kingdom) Gary Mason	2012	2	0	0	0	0	
(France) Jean Michel Mattioli	1989–1991	18	0	0	0	0	
(Italy) Lorenzo Mauri	2003, 2006, 2008	7	0	0	0	0	
(Australia) Alistair Maxwell	2000–2003	15	0	0	0	0	
(Australia) Wayne Maxwell	2018	1	0	0	0	0	
(United States) Geoff May	2014	17	0	0	0	0	
(Italy) Andrea Mazzali	2004–2005	7	0	0	0	0	
(Australia) Kirk McCarthy	1992,1994–1996, 1999	35	0	0	0	0	
(Canada) Brett McCormick	2012	7	0	0	0	0	
(Australia) Garry McCoy	2004–2005	41	1	0	2	0	
(United Kingdom) Rob McElnea	1989–1993	42	0	1	3	0	
(South Africa) David McFadden	2012	2	0	0	0	0	
(United Kingdom) Andy McGladdery	1988–1989	21	0	0	0	0	
(Australia) Sean McKay	2000	2	0	0	0	0	
(Canada) Reuben McMurter	1988–1991	14	0	1	2	0	
(United Kingdom) Nick Medd	2003	2	0	0	0	0	
(Austria) Andy Meklau	1992–2000, 2004	143	1	2	1	0	
(Italy) Marco Melandri	2011–2014, 2017–2020	201	22	25	28	0	
(Spain) Juan López Mella	1990–1992	33	0	0	1	0	
(Italy) Fabio Menghi	2016–2017	4	0	0	0	0	
(Netherlands) Robert Menzen	2003–2005	6	0	0	0	0	
(Argentina) Leandro Mercado	2012, 2015, 2017–2024	197	0	0	0	0	
(Canada) Michel Mercier	1988–1990	6	0	0	0	0	
(Italy) Massimo Meregalli	1991–1992,1994–1995	39	0	0	0	0	
(United States) Fred Merkel	1988–1993	117	8	6	10	2	
(Belgium) Stéphane Mertens	1988–1995	155	11	15	19	0	
(Italy) Davide Messori	2003	1	0	0	0	0	
(Australia) Jed Metcher	2015	2	0	0	0	0	
(United States) Mark Miller	2002	4	0	0	0	0	
(Australia) Mat Mladin	1992,1994–1995, 2002–2003	18	0	0	0	0	
(France) Hervè Moineau	1989,1992–1993	27	0	0	0	0	
(Netherlands) Robert van de Molen	2000	1	0	0	0	0	
(Spain) Josep Monge	2006	2	0	0	0	0	
(Italy) Baldassarre Monti	1989–1993	68	0	2	2	0	
(Netherlands) Paul Mooijman	2003, 2005	4	0	0	0	0	
(South Africa) Sheridan Morais	2009–2010, 2014	30	0	0	0	0	
(Spain) Carmelo Morales	2007–2008	4	0	0	0	0	
(Italy) Luca Morelli	2007–2008	33	0	0	0	0	
(Italy) Daniele Morigi	2000	5	0	0	0	0	
(France) Adrien Morillas	1988,1992–1995	63	1	0	0	0	
(Italy) Mauro Moroni	1994	17	0	0	0	0	
(United Kingdom) Brian Morrison	1988–1996, 1999	85	0	0	1	0	
(United Kingdom) Luke Mossey	2018	2	0	0	0	0	
(France) Jean Yves Mounier	1988–1995	64	0	0	0	0	
(Czech Republic) Jiri Mrkyvka	1998–2006	135	0	0	0	0	
(Australia) Karl Muggeridge	2005–2009, 2011	114	0	0	0	0	
(France) Thierry Mulot	1999–2002	22	0	0	0	0	
(France) Gerald Muteau	2000	16	0	0	0	0	
(Poland) Teodor Myszkowski	2004	2	0	0	0	0	

== N ==
Rider	Years active	Races	Wins	2nd pl.	3rd pl.	Titles	Ref
(Japan) Yasutomo Nagai	1994–1995	22	0	1	2	0	
(Japan) Shinya Nakano	2009	19	0	0	0	0	
(Japan) Kenichiro Nakamura	2002–2003	4	0	0	0	0	
(Japan) Shinichi Nakatomi	2006–2008	71	0	0	0	0	
(Thailand) Anucha Nakcharoensri	2015–2016	4	0	0	0	0	
(Italy) Gianluca Nannelli	2004–2006	32	0	0	0	0	
(France) Loic Napoleone	2008	14	0	0	0	0	
(Germany) Stefan Nebel	2003, 2006	4	0	0	0	0	
(Germany) Max Neukirchner	2005–2010, 2013–2014	148	2	3	5	0	
(Belgium) Michel Nickmans	2005	19	0	0	0	0	
(Austria) Ossi Niederkircher	1997–1998	4	0	0	0	0	
(Spain) Fonsi Nieto	2005–2009	112	1	1	3	0	
(France) Erwan Nigon	2009	2	0	0	0	0	
(United States) Tripp Nobles	1993	20	0	0	0	0	
(Australia) Jay Normoyle	2001, 2003	3	0	0	0	0	
(United Kingdom) Andy Notman	2005	2	0	0	0	0	
(Australia) Warwick Nowland	2001, 2004	19	0	0	0	0	
(Japan) Noriyasu Numata	2003	2	0	0	0	0	
(United Kingdom) Marty Nutt	2007	1	0	0	0	0	

== O ==
Rider	Years active	Races	Wins	2nd pl.	3rd pl.	Titles	Ref
(Australia) Michael O'Connor	1990–1992	6	0	0	0	0	
(Australia) Jason O'Halloran	2018	1	0	0	0	0	
(Germany) Jürgen Oelschläger	2000, 2004	21	0	0	0	0	
(Japan) Tadayuki Okada	2001	25	0	1	1	0	
(United States) Ricky Orlando	1989,1998	4	0	0	0	0	
(Japan) Yukia Oshima	1988	1	0	0	1	0	

== P ==
Rider	Years active	Races	Wins	2nd pl.	3rd pl.	Titles	Ref
(United Kingdom) Tristan Palmer	2008	2	0	0	0	0	
(Belgium) Michael Paquay	1994, 1996	33	0	0	0	0	
(Australia) Broc Parkes	2001–2002, 2009–2010, 2013	89	0	0	0	0	
(Italy) Luca Pasini	2001	9	0	0	0	0	
(Italy) Lucio Pedercini	1998–2006	177	0	0	0	0	
(Italy) Luca Pedersoli	2003, 2005	10	0	0	0	0	
(United States) Larry Pegram	1996, 2000, 2014–2015	13	0	0	0	0	
(Czech Republic) Karel Pesek	2016	2	0	0	0	0	
(France) Vincent Philippe	2005, 2013	4	0	0	0	0	
(Australia) Alex Phillis	2015	8	0	0	0	0	
(Australia) Rob Phillis	1988–1994,1996	108	4	13	10	0	
(Canada) Pascal Picotte	1990–1991,1995,1997	8	1	0	0	0	
(Italy) Robertino Pietri	2007	2	0	0	0	0	
(Canada) Benoit Pilon	1991	2	0	0	0	0	
(Italy) Luca Pini	2002–2005	11	0	0	0	0	
(Italy) Fabrizio Pirovano	1988–1995	181	10	14	23	0	
(Italy) Michele Pirro	2013, 2015, 2019, 2024	12	0	0	0	0	
(Australia) Andrew Pitt	2005–2006, 2010	53	1	2	3	0	
(France) Alex Plancassagne	2016	2	0	0	0	0	
(Germany) Heinz Platacis	1996–1999	8	0	0	0	0	
(United Kingdom) Steve Plater	2000	4	0	0	0	0	
(United States) Doug Polen	1988–1992,1994–1995	80	27	8	5	2	
(Italy) Alessandro Polita	2007, 2009, 2011–2012	22	0	0	0	0	
(France) Christophe Ponsson	2015	26	0	0	0	0	
(Portugal) Miguel Praia	2004–2005	40	0	0	0	0	
(Denmark) Renè Prang	2000	2	0	0	0	0	
(Italy) Maurizio Prattichizzo	2005	1	0	0	0	0	
(Italy) Aldeo Presciutti	1989–1995	80	0	0	0	0	
(United States) Jason Pridmore	2008	10	0	0	0	0	
(France) Frédéric Protat	1998–2001, 2003	48	0	0	0	0	
(France) Randy de Puniet	2015	26	0	0	0	0	

== R ==
Rider	Years active	Races	Wins	2nd pl.	3rd pl.	Titles	Ref
(Spain) Roman Ramos	2015–2018	99	0	0	0	0	
(Denmark) Renè Rasmussen	1988–1993	28	0	0	0	0	
(United Kingdom) Bradley Ray	2018, 2023–2024	62	0	0	0	0	
(Turkey) Toprak Razgatlioglu	2018– Present	237	63	57	33	2	
(United Kingdom) Gino Rea	2018	2	0	0	0	0	
(United Kingdom) Jonathan Rea	2008–Present	450	119	86	59	6	
(Austria) Anton Rechberger	1988,1990, 1999	8	0	0	0	0	
(United Kingdom) Scott Redding	2020–Present	184	12	17	11	0	
(New Zealand) Tony Rees	1990–1992,1998	8	0	0	0	0	
(Germany) Markus Reiterberger	2013, 2015–2017, 2019, 2024	75	0	0	0	0	
(Austria) Roland Resch	2009–2010	19	0	0	0	0	
(United Kingdom) John Reynolds	1992,1995–2001, 2003	81	1	1	2	0	
(Spain) Pere Riba	1996–1997, 2005	26	0	0	0	0	
(Italy) Mauro Ricci	1988–1990	19	0	0	0	0	
(United Kingdom) Glen Richards	2002	4	0	0	0	0	
(Italy) Michael Ruben Rinaldi	2018–2024	222	5	9	9	0	
(Hungary) Gabor Rizmayer	2014–2015	30	0	0	0	0	
(Australia) Brendan Roberts	2009	8	0	0	0	0	
(United States) Kurtis Roberts	2006	10	0	0	0	0	
(Italy) Massimo Roccoli	2005, 2017	4	0	0	0	0	
(France) Raymond Roche	1988–1992	97	23	23	11	1	
(Spain) Guin Roda	2000	2	0	0	0	0	
(Spain) Javier Rodriguez	2000–2001	18	0	0	0	0	
(Italy) Roberto Rolfo	2006–2009, 2011, 2017	105	0	0	0	0	
(Italy) Doriano Romboni	1999–2000, 2004	13	0	0	0	0	
(Germany) Peter Rubatto	1988–1993	55	0	0	0	0	
(France) Jean-Philippe Ruggia	1997	2	0	0	0	0	
(Italy) Gabriele Ruiu	2018	3	0	0	0	0	
(United States) Scott Russell	1989–1995,1997–1998	118	14	17	8	1	
(Italy) Nello Russo	2003	10	0	0	0	0	
(Italy) Riccardo Russo	2014, 2017	25	0	0	0	0	
(United Kingdom) Michael Rutter	1994,1997, 2002–2003	26	0	0	1	0	
(United Kingdom) Kyle Ryde	2024	1	0	0	0	0	
(United Kingdom) Terry Rymer	1988–1995,1998	124	2	3	6	0	
(Japan) Akira Ryō	1996–2001	14	1	2	1	0	

== S ==
Rider	Years active	Races	Wins	2nd pl.	3rd pl.	Titles	Ref
(Austria) Horst Saiger	2003–2004	12	0	0	0	0	
(Japan) Daisaku Sakai	2010	1	0	0	0	0	
(Italy) Ivan Sala	2004	4	0	0	0	0	
(France) Nicolas Salchaud	2014	2	0	0	0	0	
(Spain) David Salom	2009, 2012–2015	97	0	0	0	0	
(Italy) Mauro Sanchini	2000–2007	140	0	0	0	0	
(Italy) Federico Sandi	2010–2013	35	0	0	0	0	
(France) Dominique Sarron	1991,1993	13	0	0	0	0	
(Italy) Giuliano Sartoni	2000–2002	28	0	0	0	0	
(Italy) Lorenzo Savadori	2013, 2016–2018	74	0	0	0	0	
(Italy) Luca Scassa	2008–2010, 2014–2016	71	0	0	0	0	
(Chile) Maximilian Scheib	2018	3	0	0	0	0	
(Germany) Jochen Schmid	1994–1997, 1999	56	0	1	1	0	
(Switzerland) Dominic Schmitter	2016–2017, 2019	31	0	0	0	0	
(Germany) Michael Schulten	2004–2005	4	0	0	0	0	
(Australia) Robert Scolyer	1988–1990	8	0	0	0	0	
(Hungary) Peter Sebestyen	2014, 2016	31	0	0	0	0	
(Japan) Tamaki Serizawa	1997, 1999–2001	12	0	0	1	0	
(United States) Bubba Shobert	1988	2	0	0	0	0	
(Poland) Ireneusz Sikora	2015	2	0	0	0	0	
(Spain) Iván Silva	2005, 2008	7	0	0	0	0	
(Spain) Julian Simon	2017	2	0	0	0	0	
(Italy) Marco Simoncelli	2009	2	0	0	1	0	
(Australia) David Simpson	2000	2	0	0	0	0	
(New Zealand) Aaron Slight	1989–2000	229	13	42	32	0	
(Australia) Greg Smith	2000	2	0	0	0	0	
(Czech Republic) Jakub Smrz	2007–2012, 2017–2018	158	0	2	3	0	
(Czech Republic) Matej Smrz	2008, 2013	4	0	0	0	0	
(Turkey) Kenan Sofuoglu	2008	23	0	0	0	0	
(Japan) Tadahiko Sohwa	1989–1990,1992,1995-1996	19	0	0	0	0	
(United States) Freddie Spencer	1995	5	0	0	0	0	
(United States) Ben Spies	2009	28	14	2	1	1	
(Australia) Bryan Staring	2011–2012, 2014	17	0	0	0	0	
(Australia) Jamie Stauffer	2013	2	0	0	0	0	
(France) Bertrand Stey	2000–2003	49	0	0	0	0	
(New Zealand) Andrew Stroud	1990,1998, 2005	39	0	0	0	0	
(Finland) Jari Suhonen	1988–1992	77	0	0	0	0	
(Japan) Makoto Suzuki	1993–1994,1996-1997	10	0	0	0	0	
(Slovakia) Marek Svoboda	2005, 2007	6	0	0	0	0	
(United Kingdom) Tom Sykes	2008–2021, 2023	367	34	38	42	1	
(Poland) Pawel Szkopek	2004, 2006, 2015–2017	25	0	0	0	0	

== T ==
Rider	Years active	Races	Wins	2nd pl.	3rd pl.	Titles	Ref
(Japan) Takumi Takahashi	2017, 2019–2020	31	0	0	0	0	
(Japan) Yuki Takahashi	2019	6	0	0	0	0	
(Japan) Yuichi Takeda	1996–2000, 2002	12	1	0	0	0	
(Japan) Shinya Takeishi	1994–1999	12	0	0	0	0	
(Japan) Makoto Tamada	2000–2002, 2008–2011	51	3	1	0	0	
(Japan) Manabu Tamada	1999	2	0	0	0	0	
(Italy) Davide Tardozzi	1988–1992	75	5	2	4	0	
(Spain) Nicolas Terol	2015	12	0	0	0	0	
(France) Yoann Tiberio	2007	6	0	0	0	0	
(Spain) Jordi Torres	2015–2019	136	1	1	2	0	
(Italy) Walter Tortoroglio	2003	21	0	0	0	0	
(United Kingdom) James Toseland	2001–2007, 2010–2011	201	16	26	19	2	
(Hungary) Imre Toth	2014–2016	56	0	0	0	0	
(Czech Republic) Jiri Trcka	2005	2	0	0	0	0	
(Austria) Karl Truchsess	2003	20	0	0	0	0	
(Japan) Sutoshi Tsujimoto	1995	4	0	0	0	0	
(Japan) Takeshi Tsujimura	1999, 2002	4	0	0	0	0	
(Japan) Shoichi Tsukamoto	1989,1992–1994,1996	10	0	0	2	0	
(United States) Shane Turpin	2012	2	0	0	0	0	

== U ==
Rider	Years active	Races	Wins	2nd pl.	3rd pl.	Titles	Ref
(Austria) Robert Ulm	1994, 1999–2001	77	0	0	0	0	
(United States) Chris Ulrich	2014	2	0	0	0	0	
(Turkey) Tolga Uprak	2013	2	0	0	0	0	

== V ==
Rider	Years active	Races	Wins	2nd pl.	3rd pl.	Titles	Ref
(Italy) Alessandro Valia	2002	6	0	0	0	0	
(Italy) Alessio Velini	2004–2005	43	0	0	0	0	
(Netherlands) Barry Veneman	2011	2	0	0	0	0	
(Australia) Chris Vermeulen	2004–2005, 2010–2011	66	10	9	4	0	
(United Kingdom) Ryan Vickers	2022, 2025–Present	18	0	0	0	0	
(Spain) Jeronimo Vidal	2002	4	0	0	0	0	
(Portugal) Alex Vieira	1988–1990,1993–1994	31	1	0	4	0	
(Netherlands) Arno Visscher	2004	2	0	0	0	0	
(Italy) Gianluca Vizziello	2005, 2015–2016	48	0	0	0	0	
(Netherlands) Arie Vos	2008	2	0	0	0	0	
(Netherlands) Jeffry de Vries	1989–1996	104	0	0	0	0	

== W ==
Rider	Years active	Races	Wins	2nd pl.	3rd pl.	Titles	Ref
(Germany) Ralf Waldmann	2005	1	0	0	0	0	
(United Kingdom) Chris Walker	1997–2000, 2002–2006, 2008	148	1	1	10	0	
(Thailand) Thitipong Warokorn	2019	2	0	0	0	0	
(Japan) Atsushi Watanabe	2003	2	0	0	0	0	
(Australia) Joshua Waters	2011	6	0	0	0	0	
(Australia) Scott Webster	2000	2	0	0	0	0	
(Switzerland) Edwin Weibel	1988–1995	53	0	0	0	0	
(Australia) Anthony West	2016–2017	16	0	0	0	0	
(United Kingdom) James Whitham	1990,1992–1998	92	1	0	7	0	
(South Africa) Shaun Whyte	2009	2	0	0	0	0	
(New Zealand) Glenn Williams	1988–1989,1991	6	0	0	0	0	
(United Kingdom) Steve Williams	1988,1990-1991	10	0	0	0	0	
(Australia) Mark Willis	1998	2	0	0	0	0	
(Netherlands) Bob Withag	2005	1	0	0	0	0	
(Austria) Johann Wolfsteiner	1997, 2001	7	0	0	0	0	

== X ==
Rider	Years active	Races	Wins	2nd pl.	3rd pl.	Titles	Ref
(Spain) Rubén Xaus	1998, 2001–2003, 2006–2011	215	11	13	11	0	

== Y ==
Rider	Years active	Races	Wins	2nd pl.	3rd pl.	Titles	Ref
(Japan) Akira Yanagawa	1994,1996–2002, 2010	121	3	9	11	0	
(United States) Aaron Yates	1997–1998, 2002–2003, 2014	29	0	0	0	0	
(Japan) Wataru Yoshikawa	1994–1996,1998–2002	39	0	1	1	0	
(United States) Blake Young	2009, 2013	4	0	0	0	0	

== Z ==
Rider	Years active	Races	Wins	2nd pl.	3rd pl.	Titles	Ref
(Austria) Christian Zaiser	1998, 2003, 2007–2008	31	0	0	0	0	
(Italy) Lorenzo Zanetti	2012, 2019–2020	35	0	0	0	0	
(Italy) Giuseppe Zannini	2003–2005	13	0	0	0	0	
(United Kingdom) Aaron Zanotti	2007	2	0	0	0	0	
(United States) Jake Zemke	2009	4	0	0	0	0	
