= Tolga (given name) =

Tolga is a Turkish given name. It means "war helmet" or “the rising”. It is also an Australian Aboriginal term for “red volcanic soil”. Also in the Hazara language (a Turkic people native to central Afghanistan), it means "crown" (the crown of your head) The name is used mostly for males. It may refer to:

== People ==
- Tolga Ciğerci, Turkish-German footballer
- Tolga Çevik, Turkish actor
- Tolga Doğantez, Turkish footballer
- Tolga Geçim (born 1996), Turkish basketball player
- Tolga Güleç, Turkish actor
- Tolga Örnek, Turkish film director
- Tolga Özbahar (born 1984), Turkish handballer
- Tolga Sarıtaş, Turkish actor
- Tolga Seyhan, Turkish footballer
- Tolga Uprak, Turkish motorcycle racer
- Tolga Zengin, Turkish footballer

== Middle name ==
- Orçun Tolga Karaoğlanoğlu (born 1987), Turkish kayaker

== Surname ==
- Nazlı Tolga, Turkish-Dutch journalist

== Military ==
- Turban helmet
- Zischagge

== Variants ==
- Tulga
- F. Tulga Ocak, Turkish academic

== See also ==
- Tola (name)
- Tolga (disambiguation)
