= Kawasaki Motors Racing =

Motorcycle racing team

- 2008 name: Kawasaki Racing Team
- Base: Amsterdam, Netherlands
- Principal: Managing Director: Yoshio Kawamura; Racing Director: Ichiro Yoda; Competition Manager: Michael Bartholemy
- Rider(s): 13 Anthony West; 21 John Hopkins
- Motorcycle: Kawasaki Ninja ZX-RR
- Tyres: Bridgestone
- Riders' Championships: -

Kawasaki Racing Team (World Superbike)
- Founded: 2012
- Headquarters: Granollers, Spain
- Key people: General Manager: Guim Roda; Crew Chiefs: Pere Riba, Marcel Duinker; Riders for 2023: Jonathan Rea, Alex Lowes (World Superbikes)
- Parent: Kawasaki Heavy Industries Motorcycle & Engine
- Website: Kawasaki Racing Team by Provec Racing

Bimota by Kawasaki (World Superbike)
- Founded: 2025
- Headquarters: Granollers, Spain
- Key people: General Manager: Guim Roda; Riders for 2025: Alex Lowes, Axel Bassani; Florian Marino (test rider)
- Parent: Kawasaki Heavy Industries Motorcycle & Engine
- Website: Provec Racing

Kawasaki Motors Racing was the European subsidiary of Kawasaki Heavy Industries Motorcycle & Engine, located in the Netherlands. It was responsible for managing the racing activities of the MotoGP team.

== History ==
The subsidiary was established in 2007 as a result of the Japanese manufacturer's necessary split from Harald Eckl's organisation, who managed the Kawasaki MotoGP team since 2002. The reason for the split was Eckl's involvement with a competitor's MotoGP activities, which forced Kawasaki to terminate the relationship immediately. For the first time since Kawasaki returned to the premier class of motorcycle racing, the team became a complete ‘in house’ factory team.

On January 9, 2009, Kawasaki announced it had decided to "suspend its MotoGP racing activities from 2009 season onward and reallocate management resources more efficiently". The company stated that it will continue racing activities using mass-produced motorcycles as well as supporting general race oriented consumers. The emphasis was subsequently placed on World Superbike Championship racing using the Kawasaki ZX-10R road bike as a basis, with Paul Bird Motorsport (2009–2011) and Provec Racing, based in Granollers, Barcelona Province, Spain from 2012, together with World Supersport 300 from 2019 to 2021.

After exclusively running their own teams known as Kawasaki Racing Team (KRT), from 2025 Kawasaki entered into a partnership with Bimota – as a producer of motorcycle chassis – to be known as Bimota by Kawasaki Racing (BbKRT). Their 2025 World Superbike entry, designated Bimota KB998 Rimini and finished in red, white and black instead of Kawasaki green, uses ZX-10 Ninja powertrain, as in earlier seasons. From 2019, Kawasaki has been a major shareholder of Bimota.

For 2025, Kawasaki has transferred their direct factory KRT Superbike support, including the Ninja green colour branding, to Puccetti Racing, previously a satellite team, and rider Garrett Gerloff.

== Racing background ==
Kawasaki's first title was with Dave Simmonds in 1969 when they won the 125 cc World Championship. Kawasaki dominated the 250 cc and 350 cc grand prix classes from 1978 to 1982 winning four titles in each category.

With the introduction of the four-stroke engines into MotoGP in 2002, Kawasaki decided to take part in the new MotoGP World Championship. Kawasaki entered the championship in 2003 with 250 cc Grand Prix racer Harald Eckl's Team Eckl.

In 2003, the Kawasaki Racing Team was formed after Kawasaki had developed their new 990cc ZX-RR bike throughout 2002 and raced it in the last three races of the 2002 MotoGP season. The racing activities were managed by Harald Eckl's team based in Germany. It was not until 2004 that Kawasaki had two riders - Alex Hofmann and Shinya Nakano, who raced for the entire season. Nakano placed 3rd in Japan that year achieving Kawasaki's first podium finish in MotoGP.

In 2007, Kawasaki split from Harald Eckl because of Eckl's involvement with a competitor's MotoGP activities, which forced Kawasaki to terminate the relationship immediately. Kawasaki formed Kawasaki Motors Racing, a European subsidiary of Kawasaki Heavy Industries responsible for managing the racing activities of the MotoGP team and any other motorcycle racing activities Kawasaki may enter in the future. For the first time since Kawasaki returned to the premier class of motorcycle racing, the team became a complete 'in house' factory team.

On January 9, 2009, Kawasaki announced it had decided to "... suspend its MotoGP racing activities from 2009 season onward and reallocate management resources more efficiently". The company stated that it will continue racing activities using mass-produced motorcycles as well as supporting general race oriented consumers.

- Grand Prix motorcycle racing

Year	Champion		
Year	350 cc	250 cc	125 cc
1982	(West Germany) Anton Mang		
1981	(West Germany) Anton Mang	(West Germany) Anton Mang	
1980		(West Germany) Anton Mang	
1979	(South Africa) Kork Ballington	(South Africa) Kork Ballington	
1978	(South Africa) Kork Ballington	(South Africa) Kork Ballington	
1969			(United Kingdom) Dave Simmonds

=== 2007 MotoGP season ===
The team used the new 800cc Ninja ZX-RR and Bridgestone tyres in 2007. Randy de Puniet and Olivier Jacque were chosen as team riders.

Olivier Jacque crashed in practice during the Chinese Grand Prix, gashing his arm severely enough to be unable to race for 2 Grands Prix. He returned to racing only to crash again during practice at the Catalan Grand Prix, missing this race too. Following the series of injuries, Jacque announced his retirement from competition, but planned to continue as a team test rider. He was replaced by Australian rider Anthony West.

The team's best result for the season was a 2nd-place finish by Randy de Puniet at a wet Japanese Grand Prix.

=== 2008 MotoGP season ===
For 2008 John Hopkins joined the team alongside Anthony West. Results were poor though, being regular midfield runners throughout the season.

In August 2008, Kawasaki signed Marco Melandri to join John Hopkins for the 2009 season. However, the Great Recession led Kawasaki to reconsider its MotoGP program, and Kawasaki pulled out of MotoGP for 2009.

=== 2009 MotoGP season ===
After negotiations with DORNA, Kawasaki provided a scaled down team named Hayate Racing Team for the 2009 season. The team was renamed due to limited factory involvement, with Kawasaki providing only one bike with Marco Melandri as the sole rider.

The team achieved better than expected results with 6th and 5th placings early in the season. Melandri finished in 2nd place at the French Grand Prix. This result is equal to Kawasaki's best ever result in MotoGP and is their first podium finish since 2007.

== MotoGP results ==
(key) (Races in bold indicate pole position; races in italics indicate fastest lap)

Year	Bike	Tyres	Riders	1	2	3	4	5	6	7	8	9	10	11	12	13	14	15	16	17	18	Points	Pos.
2002	Kawasaki Ninja ZX-RR	D		JPN	SAF	ESP	FRA	ITA	CAT	NED	GBR	GER	CZE	POR	RIO	PAC	MAL	AUS	VAL			4	13th
2002	Kawasaki Ninja ZX-RR	D	(Japan) Akira Yanagawa													Ret						4	13th
2002	Kawasaki Ninja ZX-RR	D	(Australia) Andrew Pitt														19	17	12			4	13th
2003	Kawasaki Ninja ZX-RR	D		JPN	SAF	ESP	FRA	ITA	CAT	NED	GBR	GER	CZE	POR	RIO	PAC	MAL	AUS	VAL			15	12th
2003	Kawasaki Ninja ZX-RR	D	(Australia) Garry McCoy	16	17	18	9	15	17	18	16	16	18	Ret	Ret	Ret	19	13	19			15	12th
2003	Kawasaki Ninja ZX-RR	D	(Australia) Andrew Pitt	17	16	15	Ret	16	Ret	14	17	19	16	21	18	16	16	15	18			15	12th
2003	Kawasaki Ninja ZX-RR	D	(Japan) Akira Yanagawa	18					Ret													15	12th
2003	Kawasaki Ninja ZX-RR	D	(Germany) Alex Hofmann			16		14		10		17	19									15	12th
2004	Kawasaki Ninja ZX-RR	B		SAF	ESP	FRA	ITA	CAT	NED	RIO	GER	GBR	CZE	POR	JPN	QAT	MAL	AUS	VAL			134	7th
2004	Kawasaki Ninja ZX-RR	B	(Japan) Shinya Nakano	12	9	Ret	Ret	7	Ret	9	7	15	12	11	3	Ret	8	12	7			134	7th
2004	Kawasaki Ninja ZX-RR	B	(Germany) Alex Hofmann	Ret	13	Ret	14	11	13	11	10	19	13	13	10	9	Ret	13	11			134	7th
2005	Kawasaki Ninja ZX-RR	B		ESP	POR	CHN	FRA	ITA	CAT	NED	USA	GBR	GER	CZE	JPN	MAL	QAT	AUS	TUR	VAL		150	6th
2005	Kawasaki Ninja ZX-RR	B	(Japan) Shinya Nakano	5	8	Ret	8	10	9	8	9	Ret	6	12	Ret	Ret	7	7	10	11		150	6th
2005	Kawasaki Ninja ZX-RR	B	(Germany) Alex Hofmann	11				12	17	Ret	12	8	Ret	15	Ret					14		150	6th
2005	Kawasaki Ninja ZX-RR	B	(France) Olivier Jacque			2	11						Ret			Ret	DNS	16	13			150	6th
2006	Kawasaki Ninja ZX-RR	B		ESP	QAT	TUR	CHN	FRA	ITA	CAT	NED	GBR	GER	USA	CZE	MAL	AUS	JPN	POR	VAL		129	7th
2006	Kawasaki Ninja ZX-RR	B	(Japan) Shinya Nakano	7	11	8	8	12	11	DSQ	2	Ret	6	Ret	6	Ret	8	Ret	Ret	7		129	7th
2006	Kawasaki Ninja ZX-RR	B	(France) Randy de Puniet	Ret	Ret	12	12	Ret	13	Ret	14	12	Ret	12	14	13	11	Ret	10	Ret		129	7th
2006	Kawasaki Ninja ZX-RR	B	(Japan) Naoki Matsudo															Ret				129	7th
2007	Kawasaki Ninja ZX-RR	B		QAT	ESP	TUR	CHN	FRA	ITA	CAT	GBR	NED	GER	USA	CZE	SMR	POR	JPN	AUS	MAL	VAL	176	7th
2007	Kawasaki Ninja ZX-RR	B	(France) Randy de Puniet	Ret	13	8	8	Ret	Ret	5	6	Ret	Ret	6	8	Ret	Ret	2	6	4	9	176	7th
2007	Kawasaki Ninja ZX-RR	B	(France) Olivier Jacque	12	18	Ret	DNS		16	DNS												176	7th
2007	Kawasaki Ninja ZX-RR	B	(Spain) Fonsi Nieto					11														176	7th
2007	Kawasaki Ninja ZX-RR	B	(Australia) Anthony West								11	9	8	7	12	8	12	7	12	15	16	176	7th
2007	Kawasaki Ninja ZX-RR	B	(United States) Roger Lee Hayden											10								176	7th
2007	Kawasaki Ninja ZX-RR	B	(Japan) Akira Yanagawa															17				176	7th
2008	Kawasaki Ninja ZX-RR	B		QAT	ESP	POR	CHN	FRA	ITA	CAT	GBR	NED	GER	USA	CZE	SMR	IND	JPN	AUS	MAL	VAL	112	9th
2008	Kawasaki Ninja ZX-RR	B	(Australia) Anthony West	16	13	16	17	14	15	12	10	Ret	10	17	5	13	11	15	12	12	17	112	9th
2008	Kawasaki Ninja ZX-RR	B	(United States) John Hopkins	12	7	5	14	Ret	Ret	10	Ret	DNS			11	14	14	10	13	11	14	112	9th
2008	Kawasaki Ninja ZX-RR	B	(United States) Jamie Hacking											11								112	9th

== World Superbike Championship results ==
Year	Team	Bike	Tyres	No.	Riders	1		2		3		4		5		6		7		8		9		10		11		12		13		14		RC	Points	TC	Points	MC	Points
Year	Team	Bike	Tyres	No.	Riders	R1	R2	R1	R2	R1	R2	R1	R2	R1	R2	R1	R2	R1	R2	R1	R2	R1	R2	R1	R2	R1	R2	R1	R2	R1	R2	R1	R2	RC	Points	TC	Points	MC	Points
2013	Kawasaki Racing Team	ZX-10R	P			AUS	AUS	SPA	SPA	NED	NED	ITA	ITA	GBR	GBR	POR	POR	ITA	ITA	RUS	RUS	GBR	GBR	GER	GER	TUR	TUR	USA	USA	FRA	FRA	SPA	SPA						
2013	Kawasaki Racing Team	ZX-10R	P	66	(United Kingdom) Tom Sykes	5	5	**Ret**	**3**	**1**	**2**	**2**	**3**	**1**	**1**	**3**	**NC**	**1**	**1**	Ret	C	11	7	1	4	**3**	**2**	1	4	**1**	**1**	3	2	1st	447	3rd	649	2nd	501
2013	Kawasaki Racing Team	ZX-10R	P	76	(France) Loris Baz	6	Ret	5	6	5	3	7	8	5	7	5	4	9	6	8	C	5	1	DNS	DNS									8th	180	3rd	649	2nd	501
2013	Kawasaki Racing Team	ZX-10R	P	44	(Spain) David Salom																							11	9	11	11			21st	22	3rd	649	2nd	501
2014	Kawasaki Racing Team	ZX-10R	P			AUS	AUS	SPA	SPA	NED	NED	ITA	ITA	GBR	GBR	MAL	MAL	ITA	ITA	POR	POR	USA	USA	SPA	SPA	FRA	FRA	QAT	QAT										
2014	Kawasaki Racing Team	ZX-10R	P	1	(United Kingdom) Tom Sykes	7	3	**1**	**1**	2	4	3	5	1	1	Ret	3	**1**	**1**	**1**	**8**	**3**	**1**	5	3	**4**	**4**	3	3					2nd	410	2nd	735	2nd	431
2014	Kawasaki Racing Team	ZX-10R	P	76	(France) Loris Baz	5	2	2	2	**4**	**7**	4	4	2	2	Ret	5	2	2	3	6	9	6	**Ret**	**7**	5	7	2	7					5th	311	2nd	735	2nd	431
2014	Kawasaki Racing Team	ZX-10R	P	44	(Spain) David Salom	9	10	13	10	12	15	12	13	10	10	9	13	11	10	9	17	10	8	9	Ret	DNS	DNS	13	11					12th	103	—N/a	—N/a	2nd	431
2015	Kawasaki Racing Team	ZX-10R	P			AUS	AUS	THA	THA	SPA	SPA	NED	NED	ITA	ITA	GBR	GBR	POR	POR	ITA	ITA	USA	USA	MAL	MAL	SPA	SPA	FRA	FRA	QAT	QAT								
2015	Kawasaki Racing Team	ZX-10R	P	65	(United Kingdom) Jonathan Rea	**1**	**2**	**1**	**1**	1	2	1	1	1	1	2	2	1	1	2	1	3	3	1	2	4	4	1	1	2	Ret			1st	548	1st	947	1st	471
2015	Kawasaki Racing Team	ZX-10R	P	66	(United Kingdom) Tom Sykes	6	4	3	5	3	Ret	**5**	**5**	2	2	**1**	**1**	2	8	**1**	**5**	2	2	**5**	**14**	**1**	**5**	2	3	**3**	**3**			3rd	399	1st	947	1st	471
2016	Kawasaki Racing Team	ZX-10R	P			AUS	AUS	THA	THA	SPA	SPA	NED	NED	ITA	ITA	MAL	MAL	GBR	GBR	ITA	ITA	USA	USA	GER	GER	FRA	FRA	SPA	SPA	QAT	QAT								
2016	Kawasaki Racing Team	ZX-10R	P	1	(United Kingdom) Jonathan Rea	1	1	1	2	2	3	1	1	2	2	2	3	3	2	1	1	1	Ret	Ret	1	**4**	**2**	3	2	**2**	**3**			1st	498	1st	945	1st	582
2016	Kawasaki Racing Team	ZX-10R	P	66	(United Kingdom) Tom Sykes	**5**	**6**	2	1	**3**	**2**	**Ret**	**2**	3	3	**1**	**8**	**1**	**1**	**2**	**2**	**2**	**1**	2	12	3	3	**2**	**3**	4	2			2nd	447	1st	945	1st	582
2017	Kawasaki Racing Team	ZX-10RR	P			AUS	AUS	THA	THA	SPA	SPA	NED	NED	ITA	ITA	GBR	GBR	ITA	ITA	USA	USA	GER	GER	POR	POR	FRA	FRA	SPA	SPA	QAT	QAT								
2017	Kawasaki Racing Team	ZX-10RR	P	1	(United Kingdom) Jonathan Rea	**1**	1	**1**	1	1	2	**1**	1	2	2	Ret	1	3	2	2	1	2	2	**1**	1	**1**	Ret	1	1	**1**	1			1st	556	1st	929	1st	599
2017	Kawasaki Racing Team	ZX-10RR	P	66	(United Kingdom) Tom Sykes	3	6	3	2	3	4	2	2	4	3	**1**	2	**1**	3	**3**	2	**3**	4	DNS	DNS	3	7	3	5	6	Ret			3rd	373	1st	929	1st	599
2017	Kawasaki Puccetti Racing	ZX-10RR	P	88	(Switzerland) Randy Krummenacher	10	16	12	Ret	14	14	11	14	13	15	14	Ret	7	8	17	14	12	Ret											16th	50	10th	117	1st	599
2017	Kawasaki Puccetti Racing	ZX-10RR	P	13	(Australia) Anthony West																			13	8	18	14							27th	13	10th	117	1st	599
2017	Kawasaki Puccetti Racing	ZX-10RR	P	05	(France) Sylvain Guintoli																							6	8	8	8			18th	34	10th	117	1st	599
2017	Kawasaki Puccetti Racing	ZX-10RR	P	91	(United Kingdom) Leon Haslam											2	Ret																	23rd	20	10th	117	1st	599
2017	Pedercini Racing SC-Project	ZX-10RR	P	15	(San Marino) Alex de Angelis	14	11	16	11	15	Ret	12	15	11	Ret	17	Ret	12	Ret	14	13													19th	32	13th	42	1st	599
2017	Pedercini Racing SC-Project	ZX-10RR	P	84	(Italy) Riccardo Russo																	Ret	Ret	14	14	15	16	17	16					28th	5 (13)	13th	42	1st	599
2017	Pedercini Racing SC-Project	ZX-10RR	P	11	(France) Jérémy Guarnoni																									11	16			31st	5	13th	42	1st	599
2017	Grillini Racing Team	ZX-10RR	P	37	(Czech Republic) Ondřej Ježek	18	17	18	13	DNS	DNS	16	18	16	17	18	13	14	12	19	17	Ret	16	16	11	16	18	15	Ret	14	14			22nd	22	12th	52	1st	599
2017	Grillini Racing Team	ZX-10RR	P	86	(Italy) Ayrton Badovini	17	Ret	Ret	14	Ret	17	15	16	15	Ret	16	14	13	11	16	Ret	16	18	12	9	DNS	15	Ret	DNS					21st	26	12th	52	1st	599
2017	Grillini Racing Team	ZX-10RR	P	44	(Italy) Roberto Rolfo																									13	15			33rd	4	12th	52	1st	599
2017	Team Kawasaki Go Eleven	ZX-10RR	P	40	(Spain) Román Ramos	13	14	15	9	Ret	11	7	11	9	11	11	8	8	Ret	12	12	14	14	10	15	12	9	10	11	10	10			12th	118	9th	118	1st	599
2017	Royal Air Force Reg. & Res. Kawasaki	ZX-10RR	P	27	(United Kingdom) Jake Dixon											Ret	9																	30th	7	15th	7	1st	599
2018	Kawasaki Racing Team WorldSBK	ZX-10RR	P			AUS	AUS	THA	THA	SPA	SPA	NED	NED	ITA	ITA	GBR	GBR	CZE	CZE	USA	USA	ITA	ITA	POR	POR	FRA	FRA	ARG	ARG	QAT	QAT								
2018	Kawasaki Racing Team WorldSBK	ZX-10RR	P	1	(United Kingdom) Jonathan Rea	5	2	**1**	4	1	2	1	2	**1**	1	2	3	1	Ret	1	1	1	1	1	1	1	1	1	1	1	C			1st	545	1st	859	570	1st
2018	Kawasaki Racing Team WorldSBK	ZX-10RR	P	66	(United Kingdom) Tom Sykes	**2**	4	6	Ret	6	6	4	1	2	3	**3**	6	**3**	16	7	8	**5**	5	5	5	**2**	4	6	5	**2**	C			4th	314	1st	859	570	1st
2018	Team Go Eleven Kawasaki	ZX-10RR	P	40	(Spain) Román Ramos	14	11	14	13	10	11	11	Ret	Ret	12	19	Ret	13	10	12	12	13	15	14	Ret	15	18	12	13	14	C			16th	65	12th	65	570	1st
2018	Kawasaki Puccetti Racing	ZX-10RR	P	54	(Turkey) Toprak Razgatlıoğlu	13	10	15	8	9	9	10	9	11	8	21	2	10	9	Ret	DNS	11	12	8	Ret	8	12	3	7	10	C			9th	151	7th	165	570	1st
2018	Kawasaki Puccetti Racing	ZX-10RR	P	91	(United Kingdom) Leon Haslam									9	16	9	Ret																	20th	14	7th	165	570	1st
2018	Team Pedercini Racing	ZX-10RR	P	68	(Colombia) Yonny Hernández	Ret	DNS	16	11	14	16	16	15	17	13			11	14	11	15	Ret	16	12	16									18th	28	13th	35	570	1st
2018	Team Pedercini Racing	ZX-10RR	P	41	(United Kingdom) Luke Mossey											17	14																	28th	2	13th	35	570	1st
2018	Team Pedercini Racing	ZX-10RR	P	11	(France) Jérémy Guarnoni																					17	19							NC	0	13th	35	570	1st
2018	Team Pedercini Racing	ZX-10RR	P	16	(Italy) Gabriele Ruiu																							14	14	15	C			25th	5	13th	35	570	1st
2018	Orelac Racing VerdNatura	ZX-10RR	P	36	(Argentina) Leandro Mercado	10	12	13	Ret	Ret	13	8	Ret	15	10	13	12	12	17	Ret	11	10	17	11	15	14	15	Ret	12	12	C			15th	70	11th	70	570	1st
2018	SPB racing	ZX-10RR	P	5	(Russia) Vladimir Leonov					DNS	17			Ret	Ret																			NC	0	NC	0	570	1st
2018	Team WD40	ZX-10RR	P	55	(United Kingdom) Mason Law											Ret	Ret																	NC	0	NC	0	570	1st

(key) (Races in bold indicate pole position; races in italics indicate fastest lap)

Year	Team	Bike	Tyres	No.	Riders	1			2			3			4			5			6			7			8			9			10			11			12			13			RC	Points	TC	Points	MC	Points
Year	Team	Bike	Tyres	No.	Riders	R1	SR	R2	R1	SR	R2	R1	SR	R2	R1	SR	R2	R1	SR	R2	R1	SR	R2	R1	SR	R2	R1	SR	R2	R1	SR	R2	R1	SR	R2	R1	SR	R2	R1	SR	R2	R1	SR	R2	RC	Points	TC	Points	MC	Points
2019	Kawasaki Racing Team WorldSBK	ZX-10RR	P			AUS	AUS	AUS	THA	THA	THA	SPA	SPA	SPA	NED	NED	NED	ITA	ITA	ITA	SPA	SPA	SPA	ITA	ITA	ITA	GBR	GBR	GBR	USA	USA	USA	POR	POR	POR	FRA	FRA	FRA	ARG	ARG	ARG	QAT	QAT	QAT						
2019	Kawasaki Racing Team WorldSBK	ZX-10RR	P	91	(United Kingdom) Leon Haslam	15	3	3	5	5	5	9	7	4	5	C	8	5	6	C	9	6	5	Ret	3	3	3	3	5	Ret	5	6	5	5	5	Ret	9	7	6	8	10	5	4	9	7th	281	1st	944	1st	673
2019	Kawasaki Racing Team WorldSBK	ZX-10RR	P	1	(United Kingdom) Jonathan Rea	**2**	**2**	2	2	2	2	2	2	2	2	C	3	1	1	C	**4**	**4**	2	**1**	**5**	1	1	1	1	**1**	**1**	2	**1**	**1**	2	**2**	**2**	1	2	1	1	**1**	**1**	1	1st	663	1st	944	1st	673
2020	Kawasaki Racing Team WorldSBK	ZX-10RR	P			AUS	AUS	AUS	SPA	SPA	SPA	POR	POR	POR	SPA	SPA	SPA	SPA	SPA	SPA	SPA	SPA	SPA	FRA	FRA	FRA	POR	POR	POR																					
2020	Kawasaki Racing Team WorldSBK	ZX-10RR	P	22	(United Kingdom) Alex Lowes	2	4	1	9	7	5	4	4	Ret	Ret	6	9	6	6	5	9	7	8	3	2	9	6	Ret	Ret																6th	189	2nd	549	1st	392
2020	Kawasaki Racing Team WorldSBK	ZX-10RR	P	1	(United Kingdom) Jonathan Rea	Ret	1	2	2	1	6	**1**	**1**	1	**3**	**1**	1	**2**	**2**	1	**1**	**2**	4	1	1	4	4	5	14																1st	360	2nd	549	1st	392
2021	Kawasaki Racing Team WorldSBK	ZX-10RR	P			SPA	SPA	SPA	POR	POR	POR	ITA	ITA	ITA	GBR	GBR	GBR	NED	NED	NED	CZE	CZE	CZE	SPA	SPA	SPA	FRA	FRA	FRA	SPA	SPA	SPA	SPA	SPA	SPA	POR	POR	POR	ARG	ARG	ARG	INA	INA	INA						
2021	Kawasaki Racing Team WorldSBK	ZX-10RR	P	22	(United Kingdom) Alex Lowes	2	2	3	19	6	4	5	5	6	3	14	6	Ret	6	7	13	7	6	5	5	6	Ret	3	Ret	6	4	Ret	9	C	DNS	DNS	DNS	DNS	4	9	DNS	DNS	C	DNS	8th	213	3rd	764	3rd	570
2021	Kawasaki Racing Team WorldSBK	ZX-10RR	P	1	(United Kingdom) Jonathan Rea	**1**	**1**	2	**[3**	**1**	1	**3**	**3**	3	**2**	**1**	20	**1**	**1**	1	**Ret**	**3**	3	**2**	**2**	3	**2**	**1**	2	4	1	6	2	C	5	Ret	Ret	1	2	3	2	1	C	1	2nd	551	3rd	764	3rd	570
2022	Kawasaki Racing Team WorldSBK	ZX-10RR	P			SPA	SPA	SPA	NED	NED	NED	POR	POR	POR	ITA	ITA	ITA	GBR	GBR	GBR	CZE	CZE	CZE	FRA	FRA	FRA	SPA	SPA	SPA	POR	POR	POR	ARG	ARG	ARG	INA	INA	INA	AUS	AUS	AUS									
2022	Kawasaki Racing Team WorldSBK	ZX-10RR	P	22	(United Kingdom) Alex Lowes	Ret	6	5	Ret	Ret	4	7	6	4	5	8	8	3	5	6	9	Ret	DNS	4	4	4	7	3	Ret	5	4	5	6	5	4	9	7	9	3	4	3				6th	272	3rd	774	3rd	530
2022	Kawasaki Racing Team WorldSBK	ZX-10RR	P	65	(United Kingdom) Jonathan Rea	1	2	2	1	1	Ret	**3**	**1**	1	2	3	4	**2**	**2**	3	**4**	**2**	3	**24**	**3**	5	2	2	4	**3**	**3**	3	2	3	3	3	2	3	1	3	2				3rd	502	3rd	774	3rd	530
2023	Kawasaki Racing Team WorldSBK	ZX-10RR	P			AUS	AUS	AUS	INA	INA	INA	NED	NED	NED	SPA	SPA	SPA	EMI	EMI	EMI	GBR	GBR	GBR	ITA	ITA	ITA	CZE	CZE	CZE	FRA	FRA	FRA	SPA	SPA	SPA	POR	POR	POR	SPA	SPA	SPA									
2023	Kawasaki Racing Team WorldSBK	ZX-10RR	P	22	(United Kingdom) Alex Lowes	Ret	4	Ret	10	3	13	7	4	9	Ret	5	4	7	6	Ret	6	6	6	9	7	Ret	9	7	14	8	Ret	DNS				5	Ret	DNS	7	Ret	DNS				11th	149	3rd	518	3rd	391
2023	Kawasaki Racing Team WorldSBK	ZX-10RR	P	65	(United Kingdom) Jonathan Rea	2	7	8	9	4	Ret	2	2	Ret	3	Ret	5	5	5	4	**3**	**3**	5	3	4	3	1	2	3	3	3	3	**3**	**2**	4	**3**	**Ret**	10	4	3	17				3rd	370	3rd	518	3rd	391
2023	Kawasaki Racing Team WorldSBK	ZX-10RR	P	99	(France) Florian Marino																												16	16	15										24th	1	3rd	518	3rd	391
2024	Kawasaki Racing Team WorldSBK	ZX-10RR	P			AUS	AUS	AUS	SPA	SPA	SPA	NED	NED	NED	ITA	ITA	ITA	GBR	GBR	GBR	CZE	CZE	CZE	POR	POR	POR	FRA	FRA	FRA	ITA	ITA	ITA	SPA	SPA	SPA	POR	POR	POR	SPA	SPA	SPA									
2024	Kawasaki Racing Team WorldSBK	ZX-10RR	P	22	(United Kingdom) Alex Lowes	4	1	1	6	5	6	5	3	Ret	5	3	4	2	5	3	Ret	3	9	5	3	3	**Ret**	**2**	4	20	2	5	7	Ret	DNS	4	6	12	4	3	5				4th	316	3rd	445	3rd	339
2024	Kawasaki Racing Team WorldSBK	ZX-10RR	P	47	(Italy) Axel Bassani	12	11	11	10	14	Ret	9	13	18	11	6	7	12	Ret	10	16	13	Ret	8	12	15	11	10	11	5	11	Ret	12	15	12	Ret	12	10	8	14	10				14th	108	3rd	445	3rd	339
