= Tolga =

Tolga may refer to:

== People ==
- Tolga (given name), a given name of Turkish origin
- Nazlı Tolga, a Turkish-Dutch journalist and television host

== Places ==
- Tolga, Algeria, a municipality in Biskra Province, Algeria
- Tolga District, a district of Biskra Province, Algeria
- Tolga Municipality, a municipality in Innlandet county, Norway
  - Tolga (village), a village within Tolga Municipality in Innlandet county, Norway
  - Tolga Church, a church in Tolga Municipality in Innlandet county, Norway
- Tolga, Queensland, a rural town and locality in the Tablelands Region, Queensland, Australia
- Tolga Mountains, the old Turkish name for the Altai Mountains

== Other ==
- HMAS Tolga, an auxiliary minesweeper which served in the Royal Australian Navy during World War II
- Former name of the River Tolka, Ireland
