= 2013 Superbike World Championship =

26th season of the Superbike World Championship

2013 Superbike World Championship
Previous:	2012	Next:	2014
Support series: Supersport World Championship; FIM Superstock 1000 Championship; European Superstock 600 Championship; European Junior Cup

The 2013 Superbike World Championship was the twenty-sixth season of the Superbike World Championship. It began on 24 February at Phillip Island and finished on 20 October at the Circuito de Jerez after 14 rounds.

The season saw the number of riders per row on the starting grid reduced from four to three; the knockout system in use for Superpole was revised as the number of riders admitted to the first and to the third session changed from sixteen to fifteen and from eight to nine respectively. In addition, pit stops with tyre changes were introduced in order to avoid races to be interrupted due to variable weather conditions.

Tom Sykes was crowned champion after obtaining the third-place finish he needed to secure the title victory at Jerez.

== Race calendar and results ==
The provisional race schedule was publicly announced by the FIM on 6 October 2012 with fourteen confirmed rounds and one other round pending confirmation. On 15 January 2013 the Indian round was moved from 10 March to 17 November.

On 8 March 2013, the FIM issued a definitive calendar, confirming rounds at Portimão and Imola that were previously subject to contract, as well as introducing a round at Istanbul Park in September to complete a 15-round calendar. On 14 August 2013, the Indian round was cancelled due to "operational challenges" at the Buddh International Circuit. The races at Mazda Raceway Laguna Seca were held on two days; one race on Saturday, and one race on Sunday.

2013 Superbike World Championship Calendar
Round		Country	Circuit	Date	Superpole	Fastest lap	Winning rider	Winning team	Report
1	R1	Australia	Phillip Island Grand Prix Circuit	24 February	(Spain) Carlos Checa	(Italy) Michel Fabrizio	(France) Sylvain Guintoli	Aprilia Racing Team	Report
1	R2	Australia	Phillip Island Grand Prix Circuit	24 February	(Spain) Carlos Checa	(Republic of Ireland) Eugene Laverty	(Republic of Ireland) Eugene Laverty	Aprilia Racing Team	Report
2	R1	Spain	Motorland Aragón	14 April	(United Kingdom) Tom Sykes	(United Kingdom) Tom Sykes	(United Kingdom) Chaz Davies	BMW Motorrad GoldBet SBK	Report
2	R2	Spain	Motorland Aragón	14 April	(United Kingdom) Tom Sykes	(United Kingdom) Chaz Davies	(United Kingdom) Chaz Davies	BMW Motorrad GoldBet SBK	Report
3	R1	Netherlands	TT Circuit Assen	28 April	(United Kingdom) Tom Sykes	(United Kingdom) Tom Sykes	(United Kingdom) Tom Sykes	Kawasaki Racing Team	Report
3	R2	Netherlands	TT Circuit Assen	28 April	(United Kingdom) Tom Sykes	(Republic of Ireland) Eugene Laverty	(Republic of Ireland) Eugene Laverty	Aprilia Racing Team	Report
4	R1	Italy	Autodromo Nazionale di Monza	12 May	(United Kingdom) Tom Sykes	(United Kingdom) Tom Sykes	(Italy) Marco Melandri	BMW Motorrad GoldBet SBK	Report
4	R2	Italy	Autodromo Nazionale di Monza	12 May	(United Kingdom) Tom Sykes	(Italy) Marco Melandri	(Republic of Ireland) Eugene Laverty	Aprilia Racing Team	Report
5	R1	United Kingdom	Donington Park	26 May	(United Kingdom) Tom Sykes	(United Kingdom) Jonathan Rea	(United Kingdom) Tom Sykes	Kawasaki Racing Team	Report
5	R2	United Kingdom	Donington Park	26 May	(United Kingdom) Tom Sykes	(United Kingdom) Tom Sykes	(United Kingdom) Tom Sykes	Kawasaki Racing Team	Report
6	R1	Portugal	Autódromo Internacional do Algarve	9 June	(United Kingdom) Tom Sykes	(Republic of Ireland) Eugene Laverty	(Italy) Marco Melandri	BMW Motorrad GoldBet SBK	Report
6	R2	Portugal	Autódromo Internacional do Algarve	9 June	(United Kingdom) Tom Sykes	(United Kingdom) Tom Sykes	(Republic of Ireland) Eugene Laverty	Aprilia Racing Team	Report
7	R1	Italy	Autodromo Enzo e Dino Ferrari	30 June	(United Kingdom) Tom Sykes	(United Kingdom) Tom Sykes	(United Kingdom) Tom Sykes	Kawasaki Racing Team	Report
7	R2	Italy	Autodromo Enzo e Dino Ferrari	30 June	(United Kingdom) Tom Sykes	(United Kingdom) Tom Sykes	(United Kingdom) Tom Sykes	Kawasaki Racing Team	Report
8	R1	Russia	Moscow Raceway	21 July	(Italy) Davide Giugliano	(United Kingdom) Chaz Davies	(Italy) Marco Melandri	BMW Motorrad GoldBet SBK	Report
8	R2	Russia	Moscow Raceway	21 July	(Italy) Davide Giugliano	Race cancelled (Note: The second Superbike race was not held, as a result of racing being abandoned after Andrea Antonelli suffered fatal injuries during the supporting Supersport World Championship race.)			Report
9	R1	United Kingdom	Silverstone Circuit	4 August	(Republic of Ireland) Eugene Laverty	(France) Sylvain Guintoli	(United Kingdom) Jonathan Rea	Pata Honda World Superbike	Report
9	R2	United Kingdom	Silverstone Circuit	4 August	(Republic of Ireland) Eugene Laverty	(France) Sylvain Guintoli	(France) Loris Baz	Kawasaki Racing Team	Report
10	R1	Germany	Nürburgring	1 September	(Italy) Ayrton Badovini	(United Kingdom) Tom Sykes	(United Kingdom) Tom Sykes	Kawasaki Racing Team	Report
10	R2	Germany	Nürburgring	1 September	(Italy) Ayrton Badovini	(United Kingdom) Chaz Davies	(United Kingdom) Chaz Davies	BMW Motorrad GoldBet SBK	Report
11	R1	Turkey	Istanbul Park	15 September	(United Kingdom) Tom Sykes	(United Kingdom) Tom Sykes	(Republic of Ireland) Eugene Laverty	Aprilia Racing Team	Report
11	R2	Turkey	Istanbul Park	15 September	(United Kingdom) Tom Sykes	(Republic of Ireland) Eugene Laverty	(Republic of Ireland) Eugene Laverty	Aprilia Racing Team	Report
12	R1	United States	Mazda Raceway Laguna Seca	28 September	(France) Sylvain Guintoli	(United Kingdom) Tom Sykes	(United Kingdom) Tom Sykes	Kawasaki Racing Team	Report
12	R2	United States	Mazda Raceway Laguna Seca	29 September	(France) Sylvain Guintoli	(Italy) Davide Giugliano	(Republic of Ireland) Eugene Laverty	Aprilia Racing Team	Report
13	R1	France	Circuit de Nevers Magny-Cours	6 October	(United Kingdom) Tom Sykes	(United Kingdom) Tom Sykes	(United Kingdom) Tom Sykes	Kawasaki Racing Team	Report
13	R2	France	Circuit de Nevers Magny-Cours	6 October	(United Kingdom) Tom Sykes	(United Kingdom) Tom Sykes	(United Kingdom) Tom Sykes	Kawasaki Racing Team	Report
14	R1	Spain	Circuito de Jerez	20 October	(Republic of Ireland) Eugene Laverty	(Italy) Marco Melandri	(Republic of Ireland) Eugene Laverty	Aprilia Racing Team	Report
14	R2	Spain	Circuito de Jerez	20 October	(Republic of Ireland) Eugene Laverty	(United Kingdom) Tom Sykes	(Republic of Ireland) Eugene Laverty	Aprilia Racing Team	Report

Footnotes

== Entry list ==
2013 entry list
Team	Constructor	Motorcycle	No.	Rider	Rounds
(Italy) Althea Racing	Aprilia	Aprilia RSV4 Factory	34	(Italy) Davide Giugliano	All
(Italy) Aprilia Racing Team	Aprilia	Aprilia RSV4 Factory	50	(France) Sylvain Guintoli	All
(Italy) Aprilia Racing Team	Aprilia	Aprilia RSV4 Factory	58	(Republic of Ireland) Eugene Laverty	All
(Italy) Red Devils Roma	Aprilia	Aprilia RSV4 Factory	24	(Spain) Toni Elías	11–14
(Italy) Red Devils Roma	Aprilia	Aprilia RSV4 Factory	84	(Italy) Michel Fabrizio	1–10
(Germany) BMW Motorrad GoldBet SBK	BMW	BMW S1000RR	19	(United Kingdom) Chaz Davies	All
(Germany) BMW Motorrad GoldBet SBK	BMW	BMW S1000RR	20	(France) Sylvain Barrier	14
(Germany) BMW Motorrad GoldBet SBK	BMW	BMW S1000RR	33	(Italy) Marco Melandri	All
(Italy) Grillini Dentalmatic SBK	BMW	BMW S1000RR	31	(Italy) Vittorio Iannuzzo	All
(Italy) Grillini Dentalmatic SBK	BMW	BMW S1000RR	41	(Japan) Noriyuki Haga	7
(Italy) HTM Racing	BMW	BMW S1000RR	18	(Italy) Ivan Clementi	1–3, 6
(Australia) Next Gen Motorsports	BMW	BMW S1000RR	14	(Australia) Glenn Allerton	1, 12
(Turkey) Sampiyon 169 Team	BMW	BMW S1000RR	169	(Turkey) Yunus Erçelik	11
(Germany) Vanzon–Remeha–BMW	BMW	BMW S1000RR	121	(Germany) Markus Reiterberger	10
(Italy) Mesaroli Transports A.S.	Ducati	Ducati 1098R	57	(Italy) Lorenzo Lanzi	13–14
(Czech Republic) Team Effenbert Liberty Racing	Ducati	Ducati 1098R	8	(Australia) Mark Aitchison	2–4
(Germany) MR-Racing	Ducati	Ducati 1199 Panigale R	27	(Germany) Max Neukirchner	1–11, 14
(Germany) MR-Racing	Ducati	Ducati 1199 Panigale R	32	(Italy) Fabrizio Lai	13
(Italy) Team Ducati Alstare	Ducati	Ducati 1199 Panigale R	7	(Spain) Carlos Checa	1–11
(Italy) Team Ducati Alstare	Ducati	Ducati 1199 Panigale R	12	(Spain) Javier Forés	14
(Italy) Team Ducati Alstare	Ducati	Ducati 1199 Panigale R	51	(Italy) Michele Pirro	13
(Italy) Team Ducati Alstare	Ducati	Ducati 1199 Panigale R	59	(Italy) Niccolò Canepa	5
(Italy) Team Ducati Alstare	Ducati	Ducati 1199 Panigale R	59	(Italy) Niccolò Canepa	12
(Italy) Team Ducati Alstare	Ducati	Ducati 1199 Panigale R	86	(Italy) Ayrton Badovini	All
(Netherlands) Pata Honda World Superbike	Honda	Honda CBR1000RR	65	(United Kingdom) Jonathan Rea	1–10
(Netherlands) Pata Honda World Superbike	Honda	Honda CBR1000RR	72	(Japan) Kousuke Akiyoshi	4
(Netherlands) Pata Honda World Superbike	Honda	Honda CBR1000RR	84	(Italy) Michel Fabrizio	11–14
(Netherlands) Pata Honda World Superbike	Honda	Honda CBR1000RR	91	(United Kingdom) Leon Haslam	1–3, 5–14
(Australia) Team Honda Racing	Honda	Honda CBR1000RR	21	(Australia) Jamie Stauffer	1
(Turkey) CMS-Eypbike Racing Team	Kawasaki	Kawasaki ZX-10R	35	(Turkey) Tolga Uprak	11
(Japan) Kawasaki Racing Team	Kawasaki	Kawasaki ZX-10R	44	(Spain) David Salom	12–13
(Japan) Kawasaki Racing Team	Kawasaki	Kawasaki ZX-10R	66	(United Kingdom) Tom Sykes	All
(Japan) Kawasaki Racing Team	Kawasaki	Kawasaki ZX-10R	76	(France) Loris Baz	1–10
(Italy) Team Pedercini	Kawasaki	Kawasaki ZX-10R	5	(Sweden) Alexander Lundh	1–3, 5–7
(Italy) Team Pedercini	Kawasaki	Kawasaki ZX-10R	8	(Australia) Mark Aitchison	9–14
(Italy) Team Pedercini	Kawasaki	Kawasaki ZX-10R	23	(Italy) Federico Sandi	All
(Italy) Team Pedercini	Kawasaki	Kawasaki ZX-10R	25	(Italy) Lorenzo Savadori	8
(Italy) Team Pedercini	Kawasaki	Kawasaki ZX-10R	32	(Italy) Fabrizio Lai	4
(United Kingdom) Fixi Crescent Suzuki	Suzuki	Suzuki GSX-R1000	2	(United Kingdom) Leon Camier	1–11, 14
(United Kingdom) Fixi Crescent Suzuki	Suzuki	Suzuki GSX-R1000	16	(France) Jules Cluzel	All
(United Kingdom) Fixi Crescent Suzuki	Suzuki	Suzuki GSX-R1000	52	(France) Vincent Philippe	13
(United Kingdom) Fixi Crescent Suzuki	Suzuki	Suzuki GSX-R1000	79	(United States) Blake Young	12
(United States) Michael Jordan Motorsports	Suzuki	Suzuki GSX-R1000	45	(United States) Danny Eslick	12
(United States) Michael Jordan Motorsports	Suzuki	Suzuki GSX-R1000	54	(United States) Roger Lee Hayden	12
(Austria) Monster Energy Yamaha – YART	Yamaha	Yamaha YZF-R1	70	(Australia) Broc Parkes	14
(Germany) Yamaha Motor Deutschland	Yamaha	Yamaha YZF-R1	96	(Czech Republic) Matěj Smrž	10

Key
Regular rider
Wildcard rider
Replacement rider

- All entries used Pirelli tyres.

== Championship standings ==
=== Riders' championship ===
Pos.	Rider	Bike	PHI (Australia)		ARA (Spain)		ASS (Netherlands)		MNZ (Italy)		DON (United Kingdom)		POR (Portugal)		IMO (Italy)		MSC (Russia)		SIL (United Kingdom)		NÜR (Germany)		IST (Turkey)		LAG (United States)		MAG (France)		JER (Spain)		Pts
Pos.	Rider	Bike	R1	R2	R1	R2	R1	R2	R1	R2	R1	R2	R1	R2	R1	R2	R1	R2	R1	R2	R1	R2	R1	R2	R1	R2	R1	R2	R1	R2	Pts
1	(United Kingdom) Tom Sykes	Kawasaki	5	5	**Ret**	**3**	**1**	**2**	**2**	**3**	**1**	**1**	**3**	**NC**	**1**	**1**	Ret	C	11	7	1	4	**3**	**2**	1	4	**1**	**1**	3	2	447
2	(Republic of Ireland) Eugene Laverty	Aprilia	2	1	NC	Ret	4	1	3	1	7	3	Ret	1	3	Ret	Ret	C	**2**	**3**	15	2	1	1	3	1	3	2	**1**	**1**	424
3	(France) Sylvain Guintoli	Aprilia	1	2	2	2	3	6	4	4	3	2	2	2	Ret	3	6	C	4	6	4	5	4	3	**5**	**5**	2	3	4	3	402
4	(Italy) Marco Melandri	BMW	Ret	3	3	5	Ret	8	1	2	2	5	1	12	4	4	1	C	9	9	2	3	2	4	4	3	5	7	2	DNS	359
5	(United Kingdom) Chaz Davies	BMW	4	17	1	1	7	5	5	Ret	8	6	6	5	6	5	2	C	10	Ret	3	1	8	6	2	Ret	Ret	5	7	5	290
6	(Italy) Davide Giugliano	Aprilia	Ret	6	Ret	4	6	Ret	10	6	6	4	Ret	9	2	Ret	**Ret**	**C**	Ret	15	5	6	5	9	6	2	4	4	6	10	211
7	(Italy) Michel Fabrizio	Aprilia	3	4	8	11	12	9	6	5	10	10	7	10	5	8	5	C	14	11	6	8									188
7	(Italy) Michel Fabrizio	Honda																					10	10	13	10	7	Ret	17	14	188
8	(France) Loris Baz	Kawasaki	6	Ret	5	6	5	3	7	8	5	7	5	4	9	6	8	C	5	1	DNS	DNS									180
9	(United Kingdom) Jonathan Rea	Honda	8	8	4	15	2	4	8	Ret	4	11	Ret	3	Ret	2	4	C	1	4	Ret	DNS									176
10	(France) Jules Cluzel	Suzuki	11	7	6	7	8	Ret	17	Ret	9	9	8	7	Ret	11	10	C	6	2	8	14	7	7	7	6	Ret	14	11	8	175
11	(United Kingdom) Leon Camier	Suzuki	9	9	DNS	DNS	9	7	9	7	Ret	13	4	Ret	7	7	9	C	3	5	Ret	DNS	DNS	DNS					8	6	132
12	(Italy) Ayrton Badovini	Ducati	DNS	DNS	10	10	13	11	11	9	11	Ret	Ret	8	8	10	3	C	8	8	**9**	**7**	Ret	DNS	9	Ret	9	10	13	Ret	130
13	(United Kingdom) Leon Haslam	Honda	7	10	9	9	DNS	DNS			DNS	DNS	Ret	DNS	10	9	Ret	C	7	Ret	7	13	9	8	Ret	11	8	Ret	Ret	Ret	91
14	(Germany) Max Neukirchner	Ducati	10	11	11	12	11	12	12	10	14	12	13	11	12	13	7	C	12	12	Ret	9	DNS	DNS					14	11	91
15	(Spain) Carlos Checa	Ducati	**Ret**	**DNS**	7	8	10	10	DNS	DNS	12	DNS	9	6	11	12	Ret	C	13	10	10	10	DNS	DNS							80
16	(Spain) Toni Elías	Aprilia																					6	5	8	7	Ret	8	5	4	70
17	(Italy) Federico Sandi	Kawasaki	16	14	12	Ret	16	14	15	13	Ret	14	10	13	13	14	11	C	16	13	Ret	Ret	11	12	14	Ret	12	13	16	15	55
18	(Australia) Mark Aitchison	Ducati			Ret	DNS	15	15	16	Ret																					46
18	(Australia) Mark Aitchison	Kawasaki																	15	14	11	11	Ret	11	10	13	Ret	12	10	9	46
19	(Italy) Vittorio Iannuzzo	BMW	17	16	14	Ret	17	Ret	Ret	12	15	16	11	15	14	Ret	Ret	C	17	16	14	15	12	13	15	16	15	Ret	NC	Ret	27
20	(Italy) Lorenzo Lanzi	Ducati																									10	9	15	7	23
21	(Spain) David Salom	Kawasaki																							11	9	11	11			22
22	(Italy) Ivan Clementi	BMW	12	Ret	13	14	14	13					12	16																	18
23	(France) Vincent Philippe	Suzuki																									13	6			13
24	(Italy) Niccolò Canepa	Ducati									13	8													Ret	15					12
25	(Italy) Fabrizio Lai	Kawasaki							13	11																					11
25	(Italy) Fabrizio Lai	Ducati																									14	15			11
26	(Italy) Michele Pirro	Ducati																									6	Ret			10
27	(Sweden) Alexander Lundh	Kawasaki	13	15	Ret	13	DNS	DNS			Ret	15	Ret	14	DNS	DNS															10
28	(United States) Roger Lee Hayden	Suzuki																							Ret	8					8
29	(United States) Blake Young	Suzuki																							12	12					8
30	(Spain) Javier Forés	Ducati																											9	Ret	7
31	(France) Sylvain Barrier	BMW																											12	13	7
32	(Germany) Markus Reiterberger	BMW																			13	12									7
33	(Australia) Glenn Allerton	BMW	14	12																					16	17					6
34	(Turkey) Tolga Uprak	Kawasaki																					13	14							5
35	(Australia) Broc Parkes	Yamaha																											18	12	4
36	(Czech Republic) Matěj Smrž	Yamaha																			12	Ret									4
37	(Australia) Jamie Stauffer	Honda	15	13																											4
38	(Turkey) Yunus Erçelik	BMW																					14	15							3
39	(United States) Danny Eslick	Suzuki																							Ret	14					2
40	(Japan) Kousuke Akiyoshi	Honda							14	Ret																					2
41	(Japan) Noriyuki Haga	BMW													15	15															2
	(Italy) Lorenzo Savadori	Kawasaki															Ret	C													0
Pos.	Rider	Bike	PHI (Australia)		ARA (Spain)		ASS (Netherlands)		MNZ (Italy)		DON (United Kingdom)		POR (Portugal)		IMO (Italy)		MSC (Russia)		SIL (United Kingdom)		NÜR (Germany)		IST (Turkey)		LAG (United States)		MAG (France)		JER (Spain)		Pts

Colour	Result
Gold	Winner
Silver	Second place
Bronze	Third place
Green	Points classification
Blue	Non-points classification
Blue	Non-classified finish (NC)
Purple	Retired, not classified (Ret)
Red	Did not qualify (DNQ)
Red	Did not pre-qualify (DNPQ)
Black	Disqualified (DSQ)
White	Did not start (DNS)
White	Withdrew (WD)
White	Race cancelled (C)
Blank	Did not practice (DNP)
Blank	Did not arrive (DNA)
Blank	Excluded (EX)

**Bold** – Pole position
Italics – Fastest lap

=== Teams' championship ===
Pos.	Team	Bike No.	PHI (Australia)		ARA (Spain)		ASS (Netherlands)		MNZ (Italy)		DON (United Kingdom)		POR (Portugal)		IMO (Italy)		MSC (Russia)		SIL (United Kingdom)		NÜR (Germany)		IST (Turkey)		LAG (United States)		MAG (France)		JER (Spain)		Pts.
Pos.	Team	Bike No.	R1	R2	R1	R2	R1	R2	R1	R2	R1	R2	R1	R2	R1	R2	R1	R2	R1	R2	R1	R2	R1	R2	R1	R2	R1	R2	R1	R2	Pts.
1	(Italy) Aprilia Racing Team	50	1	2	2	2	3	6	4	4	3	2	2	2	Ret	3	6	C	4	6	4	5	4	3	**5**	**5**	2	3	4	3	826
1	(Italy) Aprilia Racing Team	58	2	1	NC	Ret	4	1	3	1	7	3	Ret	1	3	Ret	Ret	C	**2**	**3**	15	2	1	1	3	1	3	2	**1**	**1**	826
2	(Germany) BMW MMotorrad GoldBet SBK	33	Ret	3	3	5	Ret	8	1	2	2	5	1	12	4	4	1	C	9	9	2	3	2	4	4	3	5	7	2	DNS	649
2	(Germany) BMW MMotorrad GoldBet SBK	19	4	17	1	1	7	5	5	Ret	8	6	6	5	6	5	2	C	10	Ret	3	1	8	6	2	Ret	Ret	5	7	5	649
3	(Japan) Kawasaki Racing Team	66	5	5	**Ret**	**3**	**1**	**2**	**2**	**3**	**1**	**1**	**3**	**NC**	**1**	**1**	Ret	C	11	7	1	4	**3**	**2**	1	4	**1**	**1**	3	2	649
3	(Japan) Kawasaki Racing Team	76	6	Ret	5	6	5	3	7	8	5	7	5	4	9	6	8	C	5	1	DNS	DNS									649
3	(Japan) Kawasaki Racing Team	44																							11	9	11	11			649
4	(United Kingdom) Fixi Crescent Suzuki	16	11	7	6	7	8	Ret	17	Ret	9	9	8	7	Ret	11	10	C	6	2	8	14	7	7	7	6	Ret	14	11	8	328
4	(United Kingdom) Fixi Crescent Suzuki	2	9	9	DNS	DNS	9	7	9	7	Ret	13	4	Ret	7	7	9	C	3	5	Ret	DNS	DNS	DNS					8	6	328
4	(United Kingdom) Fixi Crescent Suzuki	52																									13	6			328
4	(United Kingdom) Fixi Crescent Suzuki	79																							12	12					328
5	(Netherlands) Pata Honda World Superbike	65	8	8	4	15	2	4	8	Ret	4	11	Ret	3	Ret	2	4	C	1	4	Ret	DNS									301
5	(Netherlands) Pata Honda World Superbike	91	7	10	9	9	DNS	DNS			DNS	DNS	Ret	DNS	10	9	Ret	C	7	Ret	7	13	9	8	Ret	11	8	Ret	Ret	Ret	301
5	(Netherlands) Pata Honda World Superbike	84																					10	10	13	10	7	Ret	17	14	301
5	(Netherlands) Pata Honda World Superbike	72							14	Ret																					301
6	(Belgium) Team Ducati Alstare	86	DNS	DNS	10	10	13	11	11	9	11	Ret	Ret	8	8	10	3	C	8	8	**9**	**7**	Ret	DNS	9	Ret	9	10	13	Ret	228
6	(Belgium) Team Ducati Alstare	7	**Ret**	**DNS**	7	8	10	10	DNS	DNS	12	DNS	9	6	11	12	Ret	C	13	10	10	10	DNS	DNS							228
6	(Belgium) Team Ducati Alstare	51																									6	Ret			228
6	(Belgium) Team Ducati Alstare	12																											9	Ret	228
6	(Belgium) Team Ducati Alstare	59																							Ret	15					228
7	(Italy) Red Devils Roma	84	3	4	8	11	12	9	6	5	10	10	7	10	5	8	5	C	14	11	6	8									226
7	(Italy) Red Devils Roma	24																					6	5	8	7	Ret	8	5	4	226
8	(Italy) Althea Racing	34	Ret	6	Ret	4	6	Ret	10	6	6	4	Ret	9	2	Ret	**Ret**	**C**	Ret	15	5	6	5	9	6	2	4	4	6	10	211
9	(Italy) Team Pedercini	23	16	14	12	Ret	16	14	15	13	Ret	14	10	13	13	14	11	C	16	13	Ret	Ret	11	12	14	Ret	12	13	16	15	117
9	(Italy) Team Pedercini	8																	15	14	11	11	Ret	11	10	13	Ret	12	10	9	117
9	(Italy) Team Pedercini	5	13	15	Ret	13	DNS	DNS			Ret	15	Ret	14	DNS	DNS															117
9	(Italy) Team Pedercini	32							13	11																					117
9	(Italy) Team Pedercini	25															Ret	C													117
10	(Germany) MR-Racing	76	10	11	11	12	11	12	12	10	14	12	13	11	12	13	7	C	12	12	Ret	9	DNS	DNS					14	11	94
10	(Germany) MR-Racing	32																									14	15			94
11	(Italy) Grillini Dentalmatic SBK	31	17	16	14	Ret	17	Ret	Ret	12	15	16	11	15	14	Ret	Ret	C	17	16	14	15	12	13	15	16	15	Ret	NC	Ret	27
12	(Italy) HTM Racing	18	12	Ret	13	14	14	13					12	16																	18
Pos.	Team	Bike No.	PHI (Australia)		ARA (Spain)		ASS (Netherlands)		MNZ (Italy)		DON (United Kingdom)		POR (Portugal)		IMO (Italy)		MSC (Russia)		SIL (United Kingdom)		NÜR (Germany)		IST (Turkey)		LAG (United States)		MAG (France)		JER (Spain)		Pts.

=== Manufacturers' championship ===
Pos.	Manufacturer	PHI (Australia)		ARA (Spain)		ASS (Netherlands)		MNZ (Italy)		DON (United Kingdom)		POR (Portugal)		IMO (Italy)		MSC (Russia)		SIL (United Kingdom)		NÜR (Germany)		IST (Turkey)		LAG (United States)		MAG (France)		JER (Spain)		Pts
Pos.	Manufacturer	R1	R2	R1	R2	R1	R2	R1	R2	R1	R2	R1	R2	R1	R2	R1	R2	R1	R2	R1	R2	R1	R2	R1	R2	R1	R2	R1	R2	Pts
1	(Italy) Aprilia	1	1	2	2	3	1	3	1	3	2	2	1	2	3	5	C	2	3	4	2	1	1	3	1	2	2	1	1	550
2	(Japan) Kawasaki	5	5	5	3	1	2	2	3	1	1	3	4	1	1	8	C	5	1	1	4	3	2	1	4	1	1	3	2	501
3	(Germany) BMW	4	3	1	1	7	5	1	2	2	5	1	5	4	4	1	C	9	9	2	1	2	4	2	3	5	5	2	5	443
4	(Japan) Suzuki	9	7	6	7	8	7	9	7	9	9	4	7	7	7	9	C	3	2	8	14	7	7	7	6	13	6	8	6	243
5	(Japan) Honda	7	8	4	9	2	4	8	Ret	4	11	Ret	3	10	2	4	C	1	4	7	13	9	8	13	10	7	Ret	17	14	236
6	(Italy) Ducati	10	11	7	8	10	10	11	9	11	8	9	6	8	10	3	C	8	8	9	7	Ret	DNS	9	15	6	9	9	7	185
7	(Japan) Yamaha																			12	Ret							18	12	8
Pos.	Manufacturer	PHI (Australia)		ARA (Spain)		ASS (Netherlands)		MNZ (Italy)		DON (United Kingdom)		POR (Portugal)		IMO (Italy)		MSC (Russia)		SIL (United Kingdom)		NÜR (Germany)		IST (Turkey)		LAG (United States)		MAG (France)		JER (Spain)		Pts
