= Yunus Erçelik =

Turkish motorcycle racer (born 1980)

- Nationality: (Turkey) Turkish
- Born: May 19, 1980 (age 46); Beykoz, Istanbul, Turkey
- Current team: Şampiyon 169 Team
- Bike number: 169
- Website: www.yunusercelik.com

Yunus Erçelik (born May 19, 1980, in Beykoz, Istanbul, Turkey) is a Turkish professional motorcycle racer. He competes in the Turkish Superbike Championship.

Erçelik was born to parents who were motorcyclists. He is the second child of four siblings. He got interested in motorcycle riding through his father. He began racing after seeing his friends were not successful in competitions held at the İzmit Körfez Circuit. He had self-confidence he could do better. In 2007, he debuted in the Turkish Superstock 1000 B Championship and became the undefeated champion.

From 2008 to 2011, Erçelik won the championships and TMF Cup in the Superstock 1000 A category. In 2011, he raced for the team KMK on Honda CBR1000RR. Erçelik took part also at Alpe-Adria and East European Championships. In 2012, Erçelik ranked second in the Turkish championship. After five of seven rounds of the 2013 Turkish championship, he scored no points.

Gaining a wildcard, Erçelik raced at the 2013 Superbike World Championship's İstanbul Park round for his own Şampiyon 169 Team on BMW S1000RR. After starting at grid 14, Erçelik placed 14th in the Race 1 and 15th in the Race 2. He took three points in total.

== Career statistics ==
=== Highlights ===
2007

- Turkish Championship Superstock 1000 B – Undefeated champion
- Balkan Open Road Racing Championship (6th Round) – 2nd

2008

- Turkish Championship Superstock 1000 A – Undefeated champion
- TMF Grand Prix – Champion
- TMF Onur Cup – Champion

2009

- Turkish Championship Superstock 1000 A – Champion

2010

- TMF Grand Prix 1000A – Champion

2011

- Turkish Championship Superstock 1000 A – Champion
- TMF Cup 1000A – Champion

2012

- Turkish Championship Superstock 1000 A – 2nd

=== Turkish Superstock 1000 Championship ===
Year	R1	R2	R3	R4	R5	R6	R7	Pos
2007	1	1	1	1	1	1	1	1st
2008	1	1	1	1	1	1	-	1st
2009	3	1	2	2	3	2	2	1st
2010	1	-	-	-	-	1	-	1st
2011	-	-	-	-	1	-	-	1st
2012	-	-	-	-	-	-	-	2nd

=== Superbike World Championship ===
Year	Make	TUR		USA		FRA		SPA		Pos	Pts
Year	Make	R1	R2	R1	R2	R1	R2	R1	R2	Pos	Pts
2013	BMW	14	15	-	-	-	-	-	-	34th	3
