= 2013 İstanbul Park Superbike World Championship round =

(Turkey) 2013 Istanbul Superbike World Championship round
Round details
- Round 11 of 14 rounds in the 2013 Superbike World Championship. and Round 11 of 14 rounds in the 2013 Supersport World Championship.
- Date: September 15, 2013
- Location: Istanbul
- Course: Permanent racing facility 5.338 km (3.317 mi)

Superbike World Championship
Pole position
(United Kingdom) Tom Sykes
1:54.872
Fastest lap race 1	Fastest lap race 2
(United Kingdom) Tom Sykes	(Republic of Ireland) Eugene Laverty
1:55.673	1:55.76

Supersport World Championship
Pole position
(Turkey) Kenan Sofuoğlu
1:58.380
Fastest lap
(United Kingdom) Sam Lowes
1:59.157

The 2013 Istanbul Park Superbike World Championship round is the eleventh round of the 2013 Superbike World Championship season. It took place on the weekend of September 13–15, 2013 at the Istanbul Park located in Istanbul, Turkey.

== Results ==
=== Superbike race 1 classification ===
Pos	No	Rider	Manufacturer	Laps	Time	Grid	Points
1	58	(Republic of Ireland) Eugene Laverty	Aprilia RSV4 Factory	18	34:57.650	4	25
2	33	(Italy) Marco Melandri	BMW S1000RR	18	+2.009	7	20
3	66	(United Kingdom) Tom Sykes	Kawasaki ZX-10R	18	+3.432	1	16
4	50	(France) Sylvain Guintoli	Aprilia RSV4 Factory	18	+3.919	2	13
5	34	(Italy) Davide Giugliano	Aprilia RSV4 Factory	18	+15.830	3	11
6	24	(Spain) Toni Elias	Aprilia RSV4 Factory	18	+15.945	5	10
7	16	(France) Jules Cluzel	Suzuki GSX-R1000	18	+16.921	6	9
8	19	(United Kingdom) Chaz Davies	BMW S1000RR	18	+21.491	8	8
9	91	(United Kingdom) Leon Haslam	Honda CBR1000RR	18	+40.186	9	7
10	84	(Italy) Michel Fabrizio	Honda CBR1000RR	18	+40.218	12	6
11	23	(Italy) Federico Sandi	Kawasaki ZX-10R	18	+41.700	11	5
12	31	(Italy) Vittorio Iannuzzo	BMW S1000RR	18	+1:39.549	15	4
13	35	(Turkey) Tolga Uprak	Kawasaki ZX-10R	18	+1 lap	13	3
14	169	(Turkey) Yunus Erçelik	BMW S1000RR	18	+1 lap	14	2
Ret	8	(Australia) Mark Aitchison	Kawasaki ZX-10R	17	+8 laps	10	1
Ret	86	(Italy) Ayrton Badovini	Ducati 1199 Panigale R	17	+8 laps	20	
Superbike - Results Race 1

=== Race 2 classification ===
Pos	No.	Rider	Bike	Laps	Time	Grid	Points
1	58	(Republic of Ireland) Eugene Laverty	Aprilia RSV4 Factory	18	34:58.775	4	25
2	66	(United Kingdom) Tom Sykes	Kawasaki ZX-10R	18	+1.708	1	20
3	50	(France) Sylvain Guintoli	Aprilia RSV4 Factory	18	+4.052	2	16
4	33	(Italy) Marco Melandri	BMW S1000RR	18	+10.860	7	13
5	24	(Spain) Toni Elias	Aprilia RSV4 Factory	18	+12.171	5	11
6	19	(United Kingdom) Chaz Davies	BMW S1000RR	18	+12.396	8	10
7	16	(France) Jules Cluzel	Suzuki GSX-R1000	18	+17.434	6	9
8	91	(United Kingdom) Leon Haslam	Honda CBR1000RR	18	+17.683	9	8
9	34	(Italy) Davide Giugliano	Aprilia RSV4 Factory	18	+25.770	3	7
10	84	(Italy) Michel Fabrizio	Honda CBR1000RR	18	+38.735	12	6
11	8	(Australia) Mark Aitchison	Kawasaki ZX-10R	18	+48.892	10	5
12	23	(Italy) Federico Sandi	Kawasaki ZX-10R	18	+49.136	11	4
13	31	(Italy) Vittorio Iannuzzo	BMW S1000RR	18	1:36.589	15	3
14	35	(Turkey) Tolga Uprak	Kawasaki ZX-10R	17	1 lap	13	2
15	169	(Turkey) Yunus Erçelik	BMW S1000RR	17	1 lap	14	1
DNS	86	(Italy) Ayrton Badovini	Ducati 1199 Panigale R			20	
Superbike - Results Race 2

=== Supersport race classification ===
Pos	No.	Rider	Bike	Laps	Time	Grid	Points
1	54	(Turkey) Kenan Sofuoğlu	Kawasaki ZX-6R	16	31:59.707	1	25
2	11	(United Kingdom) Sam Lowes	Yamaha YZF-R6	16	+0.040	2	20
3	60	(Netherlands) Michael van der Mark	Honda CBR600RR	16	+9.074	7	16
4	26	(Italy) Lorenzo Zanetti	Honda CBR600RR	16	+11.987	8	13
5	47	(Italy) Roberto Rolfo	MV Agusta F3 675	16	+12.696	14	11
6	91	(Italy) Roberto Tamburini	Honda CBR600RR	16	+12.936	10	10
7	88	(United Kingdom) Kev Coghlan	Kawasaki ZX-6R	16	+14.002	5	9
8	44	(Spain) David Salom	Kawasaki ZX-6R	16	+14.855	6	8
9	4	(Republic of Ireland) Jack Kennedy	Honda CBR600RR	16	+19.952	13	7
10	17	(South Africa) Ronan Quarmby	Honda CBR600RR	16	+20.429	20	6
11	9	(Italy) Luca Scassa	Kawasaki ZX-6R	16	+23.542	15	5
12	25	(Italy) Alex Baldolini	Suzuki GSX-R600	16	+25.392	16	4
13	5	(Italy) Raffaele De Rosa	Honda CBR600RR	16	+28.730	9	3
14	55	(Italy) Massimo Roccoli	Yamaha YZF-R6	16	+29.051	18	2
15	65	(Russia) Vladimir Leonov	Kawasaki ZX-6R	16	+29.118	12	1
16	61	(Italy) Fabio Menghi	Yamaha YZF-R6	16	+30.081	19	
17	20	(South Africa) Mathew Scholtz	Suzuki GSX-R600	16	+33.143	21	
18	66	(United Kingdom) Danny Webb	Honda CBR600RR	16	+42.864	23	
19	19	(France) Florian Marino	Kawasaki ZX-6R	16	+42.864	4	
20	87	(Italy) Luca Marconi	Honda CBR600RR	16	+42.892	22	
21	7	(Spain) Nacho Calero Perez	Honda CBR600RR	16	+1:06.473	27	
22	59	(Denmark) Alex Schacht	Honda CBR600RR	16	+1:06.836	31	
23	10	(Hungary) Imre Tóth	Honda CBR600RR	16	+1:07.681	24	
24	69	(South Africa) David McFadden	Honda CBR600RR	16	+1:16.720	30	
25	6	(Russia) Vladimir Ivanov	Kawasaki ZX-6R	16	+1:24.554	28	
26	95	(Greece) Theodosios Sinioris	Honda CBR600RR	16	1:24.896	29	
27	113	(Turkey) Barış Tok	Yamaha YZF-R6	16	+2:07.117	33	
Ret	21	(United Kingdom) Christian Iddon	MV Agusta F3 675	14		3	
Ret	99	(France) Fabien Foret	Kawasaki ZX-6R	14		11	
Ret	32	(South Africa) Sheridan Morais	Honda CBR600RR	9		17	
Ret	24	(Russia) Eduard Blokhin	Honda CBR600RR	6		32	
Ret	34	(Hungary) Balázs Németh	Honda CBR600RR	6		26	
Ret	90	(Turkey) Çağrı Coşkun	Honda CBR600RR	3		34	
Ret	52	(Australia) Damian Cudlin	Honda CBR600RR	3		25	
Supersport - Results Race at
