= Tolga Uprak =

Turkish professional motorcycle racer (born 1980)

- Nationality: Turkish
- Born: 17 October 1980 (age 46)
- Current team: CMS –EYP Bike Racing
- Bike number: 35

Tolga Uprak (17 October 1980) is a Turkish professional motorcycle racer. He competes in the Turkish Superbike Championship.

Uprak raced in 2002 in the Turkish Championship winning the round at the İzmit Körfez Circuit. He won the race at İzmir-Pınarbaşı in 2004. He raced in 2006 in the Turkish Championship's Supersport Category A.

In 2010, Uprak was conscripted in to the army, and had so to stay away from racing.

In 2012, Uprak won the six-round Turkish championship for the 1000cc Category A and the TMF Grand Prix. Riding for CMS –EYP Bike Racing Team on Ducati 852, he leads the 2013 Turkish Championship Supersport A with 85 points after the fourth leg.

Gaining a wildcard, Uprak raced at the 2013 Superbike World Championship's İstanbul Park round for the team CMS –EYP Bike Racing on Kawasaki ZX-10R. After starting at grid 13, he placed 13th in the Race 1 and 14th in the Race 2. He took five points in total.

== Career statistics ==
Season	Event	Circuit	Moto	Team	Pos
2002	Turkish Championship	İzmit Körfez			1st
2004	Turkish Championship	İzmir Pınarbaşı			1st
2007	Turkish Championship Supersport	İzmit Körfez	Yamaha 16	Castrol Team	3rd
2008	East European Championship	Serbia		Aroma Racing Team	3rd
2011	Pleven, Bulgaria	Turkish Cup	Yamaha 20	MotorDelisi Racing	2nd
2012					1st
2013	Turkish Championship Supersport		Ducati panigale 1199r	CMS –EYP Bike Racing Team	1st*

- * Season still in progress

=== Superbike World Championship ===
Year	Make	1		2		3		4		5		6		7		8		9		10		11		12		13		14		Pos	Pts
Year	Make	R1	R2	R1	R2	R1	R2	R1	R2	R1	R2	R1	R2	R1	R2	R1	R2	R1	R2	R1	R2	R1	R2	R1	R2	R1	R2	R1	R2	Pos	Pts
2013	Kawasaki	AUS	AUS	SPA	SPA	NED	NED	ITA	ITA	GBR	GBR	POR	POR	ITA	ITA	RUS	RUS	GBR	GBR	GER	GER	TUR; 13	TUR; 14	USA	USA	FRA	FRA	SPA	SPA	32nd	5
