= Chaz Davies =

Welsh motorcycle racer (born 1987)

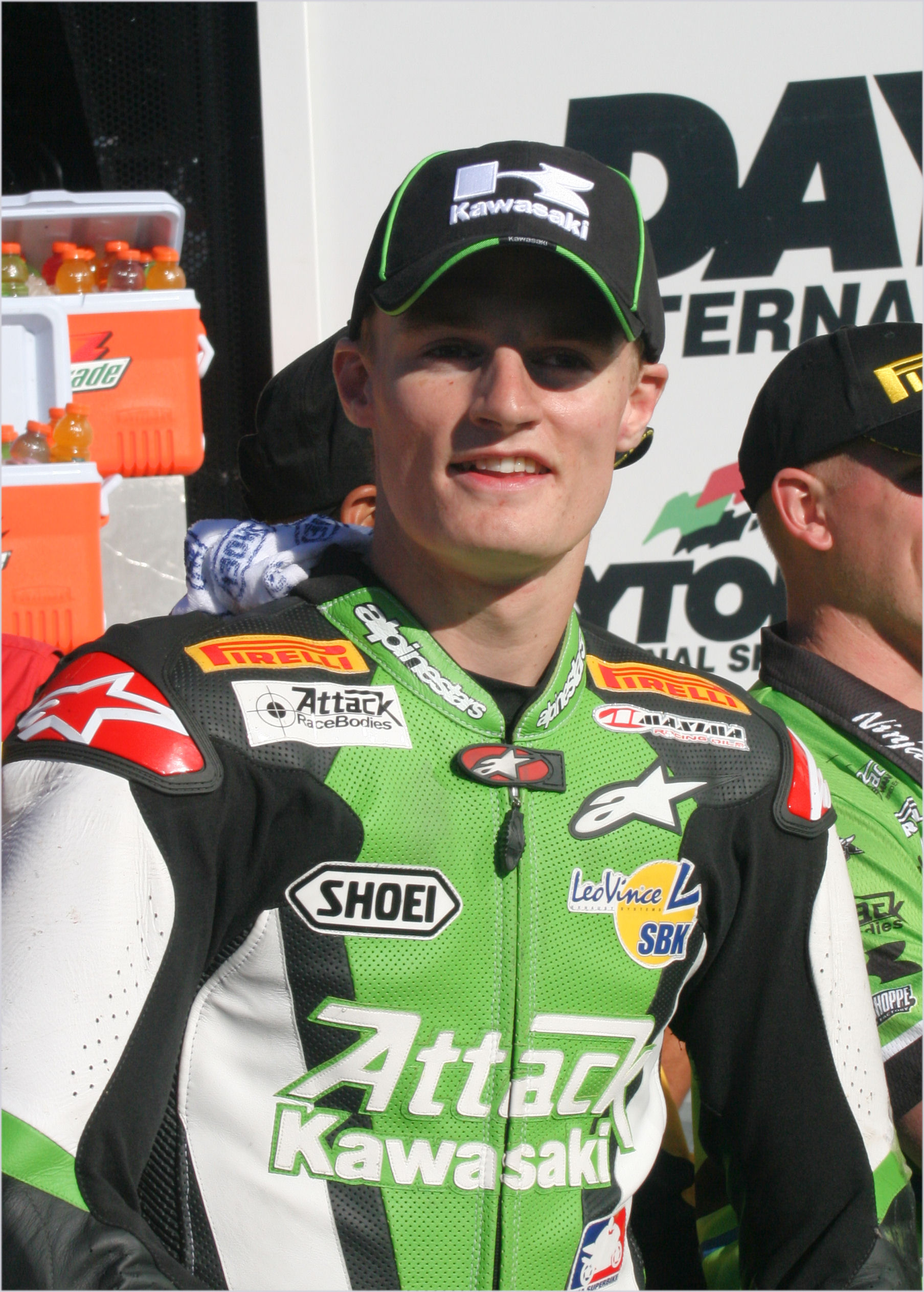
- Davies at the Daytona 200 in 2008
- Nationality: British
- Born: 10 February 1987 (age 39); Knighton, Wales
- Current team: Aruba Cloud MotoE
Motorcycle racing career statistics
MotoGP World Championship
Active years	2007
Manufacturers	Ducati
Championships	0
2007 championship position	NC (0 pts)
Starts / Wins / Podiums / Poles / F. laps / Points; 3 / 0 / 0 / 0 / 0 / 0
250cc World Championship
Active years	2003–2006
Manufacturers	Aprilia, Honda
Championships	0
2006 championship position	32nd (3 pts)
Starts / Wins / Podiums / Poles / F. laps / Points; 55 / 0 / 0 / 0 / 0 / 119
125cc World Championship
Active years	2002
Manufacturers	Aprilia
Championships	0
2002 championship position	29th (5 pts)
Starts / Wins / Podiums / Poles / F. laps / Points; 15 / 0 / 0 / 0 / 0 / 5
MotoE World Championship
Active years	2024
Manufacturers	Ducati
2024 championship position	17th (35 pts)
Starts / Wins / Podiums / Poles / F. laps / Points; 16 / 0 / 0 / 0 / 0 / 35
Superbike World Championship
Active years	2012–2021
Manufacturers	Aprilia, BMW, Ducati
Championships	0
2017 championship position	2nd (403 pts)
Starts / Wins / Podiums / Poles / F. laps / Points; 263 / 32 / 99 / 7 / 37 / 2071.5
Supersport World Championship
Active years	2009–2011
Manufacturers	Triumph, Yamaha
Championships	1 (2011)
2011 championship position	1st (206 pts)
Starts / Wins / Podiums / Poles / F. laps / Points; 28 / 6 / 12 / 1 / 1 / 381

Chaz Richard Page Davies (born 10 February 1987) is a Welsh motorcycle racer primarily known for his career in the Superbike World Championship, where he finished three times as runner-up. In 2024, Davies was confirmed as a rider in the MotoE World Championship, an electrically powered race series.

Davies was the 2011 World Supersport champion and also the 2011 BBC Wales Sports Personality of the Year.

== Career ==
=== Early career ===
Davies started racing in the British Mini Moto championship in 1995, moving up to Junior Road racing in 1999. In the same season, he was given special dispensation at the age of 12 to take part in the Aprilia Challenge 125cc Championship. Davies finished sixth overall, and was the only rider to finish every race in a points scoring position. He set a new lap record at Donington Park National circuit, and was awarded 'Superteen of the Year'. He stayed with the series for a second year, and was runner up in the championship.

In 2001, Davies moved to the British 125 Championship, placing seventh after completing 8 of 13 rounds. Davies was the youngest winner of a British Championship race in July at Thruxton at the age of 14 years 5 months. Davies also contested all rounds of the Spanish National 125 Championship with the Telefonica Movistar team under the management of Alberto Puig. He was nominated for BBC "Young Sports Personality of the Year."

In 2002, management company Dorna Sports placed Chaz with Team Matteoni Racing to compete in the 125cc Grand Prix World Championship riding a kit Aprilia. Davies became the youngest rider to compete in a full season of GP Motorcycle racing.

From 2003, Davies rode for Aprilia Germany on the back of the consistent performance in his 125cc 'Rookie' season. In 2003, he became the youngest rider to score World Championship points in the 250cc class finishing 15th place in the Gauloises Africa's Grand Prix. For the 2004 season, still the youngest rider by two years, Davies finished 13th in the 250cc World Championship Classification out of the 36 regular starters scoring three top-ten results in the final three races of the season. Davies finished 2004 with a series of outstanding results on what was a customer kit level of bike, far inferior to those of the factory teams. He finished ninth in Malaysia, sixth in Australia and then backed it up with fifth at the final race in Valencia.

Davies again signed for Aprilia Germany for 2005 in hope that Aprilia would provide him with factory material after his strong end to 2004. With two top-ten results in Italy and Turkey, Davies again proved himself a consistent front runner within the non-factory machines but again failed to secure any type of factory backing. He finished the championship in 16th.

For the 2006 season, Davies was promised a semi-works Aprilia bike by the Campetella team, but this did not materialise after the team ran into serious sponsorship difficulties and Davies was forced to ride a series of privateer options. After Campetella replaced Davies for the Mugello round with a sponsored rider Franco Battaini due to financial difficulties, Davies secured a semi-works Honda ride for another team the 2006 British GP at Donington Park. He then rode a 600 cc Yamaha in the AMA Championship at Mid-Ohio; then finished out the season with a 250 cc ride at the closing Grand Prix of the year at Cheste, near Valencia.

=== AMA ===
In 2007, Davies raced in the AMA Supersport Championship and Formula X-Treme Championship, racing a Yamaha for the Celtic Racing team. In 2008, he rode a Kawasaki for Attack Kawasaki. In early December 2007, Davies set the fastest times in two classes while testing at Daytona for the upcoming opening race of the 2008 AMA season. He was named winner of the 2008 Daytona 200 after original race winner, Josh Hayes, was disqualified for an illegal crankshaft. Davies became the first racer from the United Kingdom to win the prestigious race.

For 2009, Davies signed with KWS Aprilia to run in the all-new AMA Daytona Sportbike series, finishing the season with moderate success.

=== MotoGP World Championship ===
In 2007, Davies made his MotoGP debut, at Mazda Raceway Laguna Seca for Pramac d'Antin Ducati, riding a Desmosedici GP7 in replacement for the injured Alex Hofmann, who crashed in first practice. Already there for the supporting AMA round, Davies took over on an unfamiliar bike and track. Despite setting solid laptimes, he was overlooked for the following event at Brno, with Iván Silva replacing Hofmann.

On 28 September 2007, it was announced that Davies would replace Hofmann at the D'Antin squad for the final three rounds of the 2007 season. After failing to score in Phillip Island and Sepang, Davies was forced to pull out of the final race of the season in Valencia due to hand and wrist injuries sustained during the qualifying and practice sessions. Davies was offered a full-time testing role with Ducati for 2008, but he turned it down in favour of a return to AMA.

=== Supersport World Championship ===
Davies made a switch to World Supersport late in the 2009 season for Triumph, remaining with them for 2010. He was consistently their fastest rider, scoring podium finishes at Valencia, Kyalami and Brno. After his Brno success, team manager Guiliano Rovelli commented "He is a tough bloke who always gives 110% and is now the best rider in Supersport". He came agonisingly close to a first class win at Imola – suffering a fuel pump failure while running third, just as leaders Kenan Sofuoglu and Eugene Laverty collided.

2011 saw Davies team switch to Yamaha machinery. After a disappointing start to his championship campaign with a puncture at the first race, Davies scored eight podiums with six wins on his way to securing the 2011 World Supersport Title.

=== Superbike World Championship ===
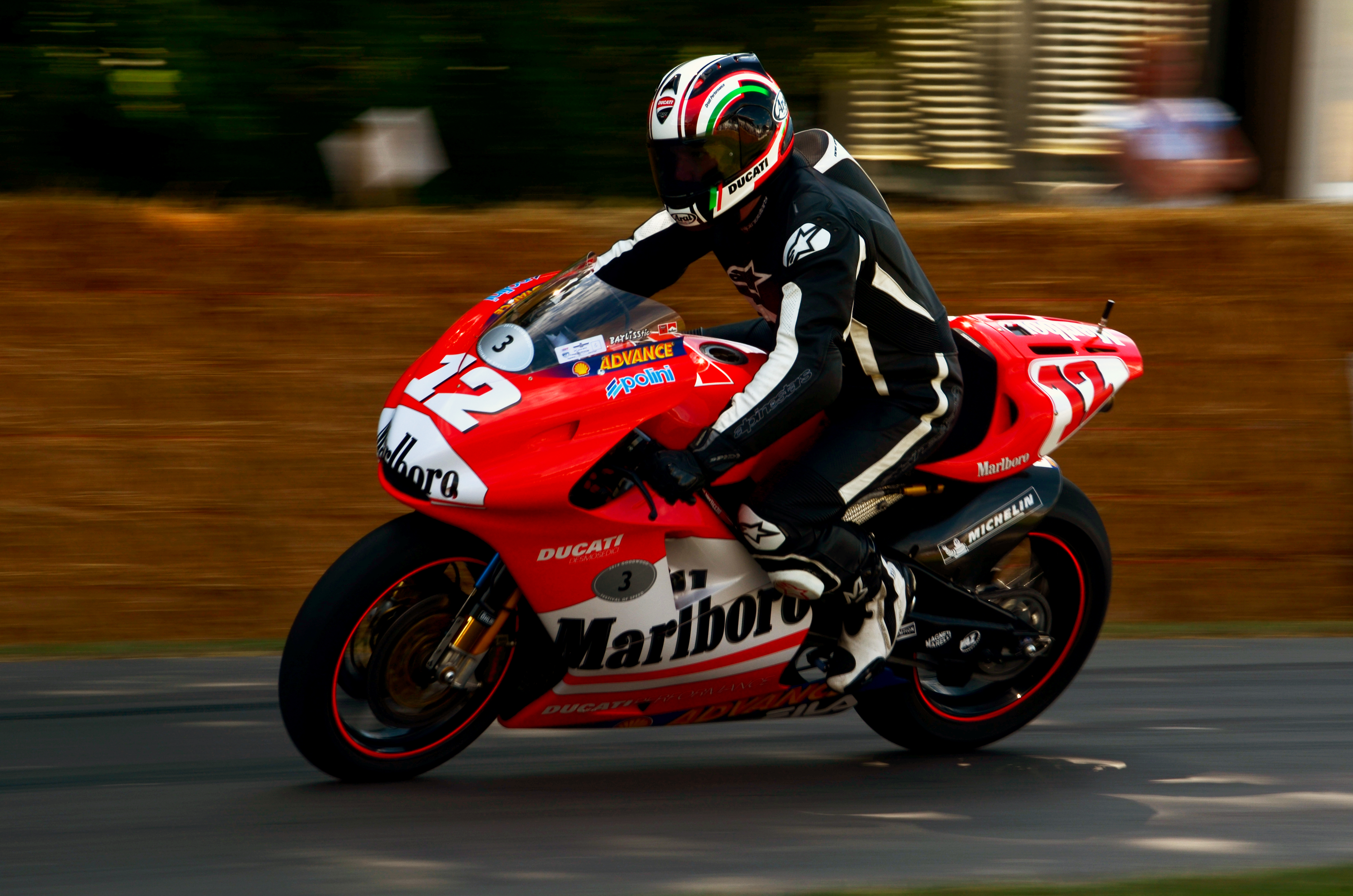
Chaz Davies at the 2014 Goodwood Festival of Speed

In 2012, Davies moved to the World Superbike championship to join ParkinGO MTC Racing Aprilia. After a highly impressive debut season, he finished ninth overall with four podium finishes, including one win.

For the 2013 season, Davies moved to the factory BMW Motorrad Goldbet team.

From 2015, Davies rode for the Aruba.it Ducati team. Davies announced his retirement from regular competition in September 2021.

=== Post Superbike Career ===
From 2022, Davies was a rider-coach working with Ducati and Feel Racing, mentoring Alvaro Bautista and Michael Ruben Rinaldi in World Superbikes and Nicolo Bulega in Ducati's inaugural World Supersport season, riding the Panigale V-twin.

Davies intended to compete in the 2022 24 Hours of Le Mans endurance race but was ill. He entered the 2023 event on an ERC Endurance Ducati with David Checa and Philipp Öttl, finishing fifth.

In 2024, Davies was confirmed as a rider in the MotoE World Championship, an electrically powered race series using Ducati series-specified machines.

== Career statistics ==
=== All-time statistics ===
Series	Years	Races	Poles	Podiums	**Wins**	**2nd place**	**3rd place**	Fastest laps	Titles
125cc	^{2002}	15	0	0	0	0	0	0	0
250cc	^{2003–2006}	55	0	0	0	0	0	0	0
AMA Formula Xtreme	^{2006–2008}	22	0	4	1	0	3	0	0
AMA Supersport Championship	^{2006–2008}	22	0	0	0	0	0	0	0
MotoGP	^{2007}	3	0	0	0	0	0	0	0
AMA Pro Daytona SportBike	^{2009}	20	0	2	0	2	0	0	0
World Supersport Championship	^{2009–2011}	28	1	12	6	1	5	1	1
World Superbike Championship	^{2012–2020}	237	7	98	32	37	29	36	0
MotoE World Championship	^{2024}	16	0	0	0	0	0	0	0
Total		418	8	116	39	40	37	37	1

=== Grand Prix motorcycle racing ===
==== Races by year ====
(key) (Races in bold indicate pole position, races in italics indicate fastest lap)

Year	Class	Bike	1	2	3	4	5	6	7	8	9	10	11	12	13	14	15	16	17	18	Pos	Pts
2002	125cc	Aprilia	JPN; Ret	RSA; 21	SPA; 24	FRA; 18	ITA; 18	CAT; Ret	NED; 24	GBR; 16	GER; 20	CZE; DNS	POR; 11	BRA; 29	PAC; 24	MAL; 25	AUS; 22	VAL; 28			29th	5
2003	250cc	Aprilia	JPN; 18	RSA; 15	SPA; 18	FRA; Ret	ITA; 13	CAT; Ret	NED; 24	GBR; 13	GER; 12	CZE; 14	POR; 20	BRA; 9	PAC; 11	MAL; 12	AUS; 15	VAL; 13			14th	33
2004	250cc	Aprilia	RSA; Ret	SPA; Ret	FRA; 12	ITA; 17	CAT; 13	NED; 15	BRA; 13	GER; 12	GBR; Ret	CZE; 8	POR; 16	JPN; Ret	QAT; 16	MAL; 9	AUS; 6	VAL; 5			13th	51
2005	250cc	Aprilia	SPA; 11	POR; Ret	CHN; Ret	FRA; 12	ITA; 10	CAT; Ret	NED; 14	GBR; Ret	GER; Ret	CZE; Ret	JPN; Ret	MAL; 12	QAT; 16	AUS; 11	TUR; 10	VAL; 16			16th	32
2006	250cc	Aprilia	SPA; 13	QAT; 17	TUR; Ret	CHN; 17	FRA; Ret	ITA	CAT	NED											32nd	3
2006	250cc	Honda									GBR; Ret	GER	CZE	MAL	AUS	JPN	POR	VAL; 21			32nd	3
2007	MotoGP	Ducati	QAT	SPA	TUR	CHN	FRA	ITA	CAT	GBR	NED	GER	USA; 16	CZE	SMR	POR	JPN	AUS; Ret	MAL; 17	VAL; DNS	NC	0
2024	MotoE	Ducati	POR1; 9	POR2; 15	FRA1; 13	FRA2; 12	CAT1; Ret	CAT2; 14	ITA1; 14	ITA2; 16	NED1; 9	NED2; Ret	GER1; 14	GER2; 16	AUT1; 13	AUT2; 14	RSM1; 15	RSM2; 15			17th	35

=== AMA Formula Xtreme ===
==== Races by year ====
(key)

Year	Bike	1	2	3	4	5	6	7	8	9	10	11	Pos	Pts
2006	Yamaha	DAY	BAR	FON	INF	RAM	MIL	LAG	M-O	VIR	RAT	M-O; 8	45th	23
2007	Yamaha	DAY; 4	BAR; Ret	FON; 4	INF; 28	RAM; 15	MIL; 3	LAG; 6	M-O; 3	VIR; 6	RAT; 6	LAG; 6	6th	206
2008	Kawasaki	DAY; 1	BAR; 3	FON; 5	INF; 27	MIL; Ret	RAM; 6	M-O; 4	VIR; 6	RAT; 5	LAG; 5		5th	224

=== AMA Supersport Championship ===
==== Races by year ====
(key)

Year	Bike	1	2	3	4	5	6	7	8	9	10	11	Pos	Pts
2006	Yamaha	DAY	BAR	FON	INF	RAM	MIL	LAG	M-O	VIR	RAT	M-O; 5	40th	26
2007	Yamaha	DAY; 8	BAR; Ret	FON; 8	INF; 4	RAM; 7	MIL; 9	LAG; Ret	M-O	VIR; 6	RAT; Ret	LAG; Ret	13th	145
2008	Kawasaki	DAY; 4	BAR; 10	FON; 8	INF; 10	MIL; 9	RAM; 6	LAG; 15	M-O; 9	VIR; 11	RAT; 16	LAG; 4	6th	239

=== AMA Pro Daytona SportBike ===
==== Races by year ====
(key)

Year	Bike	1	2		3		4		5		6		7	8		9		10		11		Pos	Pts
Year	Bike	1	R1	R2	R1	R2	R1	R2	R1	R2	R1	R2	7	R1	R2	R1	R2	R1	R2	R1	R2	Pos	Pts
2009	Aprilia	DAY; 7	FON; 8	FON; 7	RAT; 5	RAT; 6	BAR; 28	BAR; 4	INF; 4	INF; 31	RAM; 39	RAM; 8	LAG; 2	M-O; 5	M-O; 7	HRT; 4	HRT; 36	VIR; 36	VIR; 30	N-J; 2	N-J; 29	9th	219

=== Supersport World Championship ===
==== Races by year ====
(key) (Races in bold indicate pole position; races in italics indicate fastest lap)

Year	Bike	1	2	3	4	5	6	7	8	9	10	11	12	13	14	Pos	Pts
2009	Triumph	AUS	QAT	SPA	NED	ITA	RSA	USA	SMR	GBR	CZE	GER	ITA; 4	FRA; Ret	POR; 7	20th	22
2010	Triumph	AUS; 12	POR; 4	SPA; 3	NED; 4	ITA; 7	RSA; 3	USA; 4	SMR; 4	CZE; 3	GBR; 4	GER; 5	ITA; Ret	FRA; 3		4th	153
2011	Yamaha	AUS; 18	EUR; 2	NED; 1	**ITA**; 1	SMR; 6	SPA; 1	CZE; 3	GBR; 1	GER; 1	ITA; Ret	FRA; 6	POR; 1			**1st**	**206**

=== Superbike World Championship ===
==== Races by year ====
(key) (Races in bold indicate pole position) (Races in italics indicate fastest lap)

Year	Bike	1		2		3		4		5		6		7		8		9		10		11		12		13		14		Pos	Pts
Year	Bike	R1	R2	R1	R2	R1	R2	R1	R2	R1	R2	R1	R2	R1	R2	R1	R2	R1	R2	R1	R2	R1	R2	R1	R2	R1	R2	R1	R2	Pos	Pts
2012	Aprilia	AUS; DNS	AUS; DNS	ITA; Ret	ITA; 14	NED; Ret	NED; Ret	ITA; C	ITA; 12	EUR; 12	EUR; 7	USA; 7	USA; 4	SMR; 6	SMR; Ret	SPA; 4	SPA; 3	CZE; 11	CZE; 6	GBR; 14	GBR; 7	RUS; Ret	RUS; 3	GER; 3	GER; 1	POR; DNS	POR; Ret	FRA; Ret	FRA; 8	9th	164.5
2013	BMW	AUS; 4	AUS; 17	SPA; 1	SPA; 1	NED; 7	NED; 5	ITA; 5	ITA; Ret	GBR; 8	GBR; 6	POR; 6	POR; 5	ITA; 6	ITA; 5	RUS; 2	RUS; C	GBR; 10	GBR; Ret	GER; 3	GER; 1	TUR; 8	TUR; 6	USA; 2	USA; Ret	FRA; Ret	FRA; 5	SPA; 7	SPA; 5	5th	290
2014	Ducati	AUS; 8	AUS; 7	SPA; 4	SPA; Ret	NED; 7	NED; 8	ITA; 2	ITA; 2	GBR; 5	GBR; 5	MAL; 4	MAL; 8	ITA; 4	ITA; Ret	POR; 18	POR; 3	USA; Ret	USA; DNS	SPA; 3	SPA; 4	FRA; Ret	FRA; 9	QAT; 7	QAT; 5					6th	215
2015	Ducati	AUS; 3	AUS; 3	THA; 11	THA; 15	SPA; 2	SPA; 1	NED; 2	NED; 2	ITA; DNS	ITA; Ret	GBR; 3	GBR; 3	POR; 3	POR; 4	ITA; 3	ITA; 4	**USA**; 1	**USA**; 1	MAL; 2	MAL; 1	SPA; 2	SPA; 1	FRA; 6	FRA; 2	QAT; 4	QAT; 2			2nd	416
2016	Ducati	AUS; 2	AUS; 10	THA; 4	THA; 3	SPA; 1	SPA; 1	NED; 2	NED; 5	**ITA**; 1	**ITA**; 1	MAL; 3	MAL; 4	GBR; Ret	GBR; 3	ITA; 4	ITA; Ret	USA; Ret	USA; 3	**GER**; 1	**GER**; 6	FRA; 1	FRA; 1	SPA; 1	SPA; 1	QAT; 1	QAT; 1			3rd	445
2017	Ducati	AUS; 2	AUS; 2	THA; 2	THA; 6	**ARA**; Ret	ARA; 1	NED; Ret	NED; 3	**ITA**; 1	ITA; 1	GBR; 8	GBR; 3	ITA; Ret	ITA; DNS	USA; 1	USA; 3	GER; 1	GER; 1	POR; 2	POR; Ret	FRA; 10	FRA; 1	SPA; 2	SPA; 3	QAT; 2	QAT; 2			2nd	403
2018	Ducati	AUS; 3	AUS; Ret	THA; 3	THA; 1	ARA; 2	ARA; 1	NED; 3	NED; 5	ITA; 2	ITA; 2	GBR; 8	GBR; 5	CZE; 8	CZE; 3	**USA**; 2	USA; 2	ITA; 2	ITA; 4	POR; 4	POR; 4	FRA; 5	FRA; 2	ARG; Ret	ARG; 4	QAT; 7	QAT; C			2nd	356

Year	Bike	1			2			3			4			5			6			7			8			9			10			11			12			13			Pos	Pts
Year	Bike	R1	SR	R2	R1	SR	R2	R1	SR	R2	R1	SR	R2	R1	SR	R2	R1	SR	R2	R1	SR	R2	R1	SR	R2	R1	SR	R2	R1	SR	R2	R1	SR	R2	R1	SR	R2	R1	SR	R2	Pos	Pts
2019	Ducati	AUS; 10	AUS; 10	AUS; 7	THA; 15	THA; 8	THA; Ret	SPA; 3	SPA; 4	SPA; 3	NED; 7	NED; C	NED; 5	**ITA**; Ret	**ITA**; 2	ITA; C	SPA; 7	SPA; 10	SPA; Ret	ITA; 5	ITA; 17	ITA; 7	GBR; 10	GBR; 7	GBR; 9	USA; 2	USA; 2	USA; 1	POR; 2	POR; 10	POR; 16	FRA; Ret	FRA; 4	FRA; 4	ARG; DNS	ARG; 4	ARG; 2	QAT; 2	QAT; 5	QAT; 2	6th	294
2020	Ducati	AUS; 8	AUS; 13	AUS; 5	SPA; 4	SPA; 5	SPA; 2	POR; 11	POR; Ret	POR; 4	SPA; 2	SPA; 5	SPA; 2	SPA; 3	SPA; 5	SPA; Ret	SPA; 3	SPA; 4	SPA; 1	FRA; 4	FRA; 5	FRA; 3	POR; 2	POR; 4	POR; 1																3rd	273
2021	Ducati	SPA; 5	SPA; 4	SPA; 19	POR; 6	POR; 9	POR; 2	ITA; NC	ITA; Ret	ITA; Ret	GBR; 11	GBR; 8	GBR; 7	NED; 9	NED; 9	NED; 4	CZE; Ret	CZE; 14	CZE; 12	SPA; Ret	SPA; 7	SPA; Ret	FRA; 7	FRA; 8	FRA; 5	SPA; 10	SPA; Ret	SPA; DNS	SPA	SPA	SPA	POR	POR	POR	ARG; 12	ARG; 13	ARG; 9	INA; 8	INA; C	INA; 12	12th	143
