= İzmit Körfez Circuit =

Motor sports race track in İzmit, Kocaeli, Turkey

İzmit Körfez Circuit İzmit Körfez Yarış Pisti
- Location: Körfez, Kocaeli, Turkey
- Coordinates: 40°44′35″N 29°47′07″E
- Capacity: 5,000
- Opened: 1993
- Major events: Formula 3, Drag racing, Superbike, Supersport, Supermoto, Honda 125cc, 250cc, Karting
- Length: 1.950 km (1.212 miles)
- Turns: 9

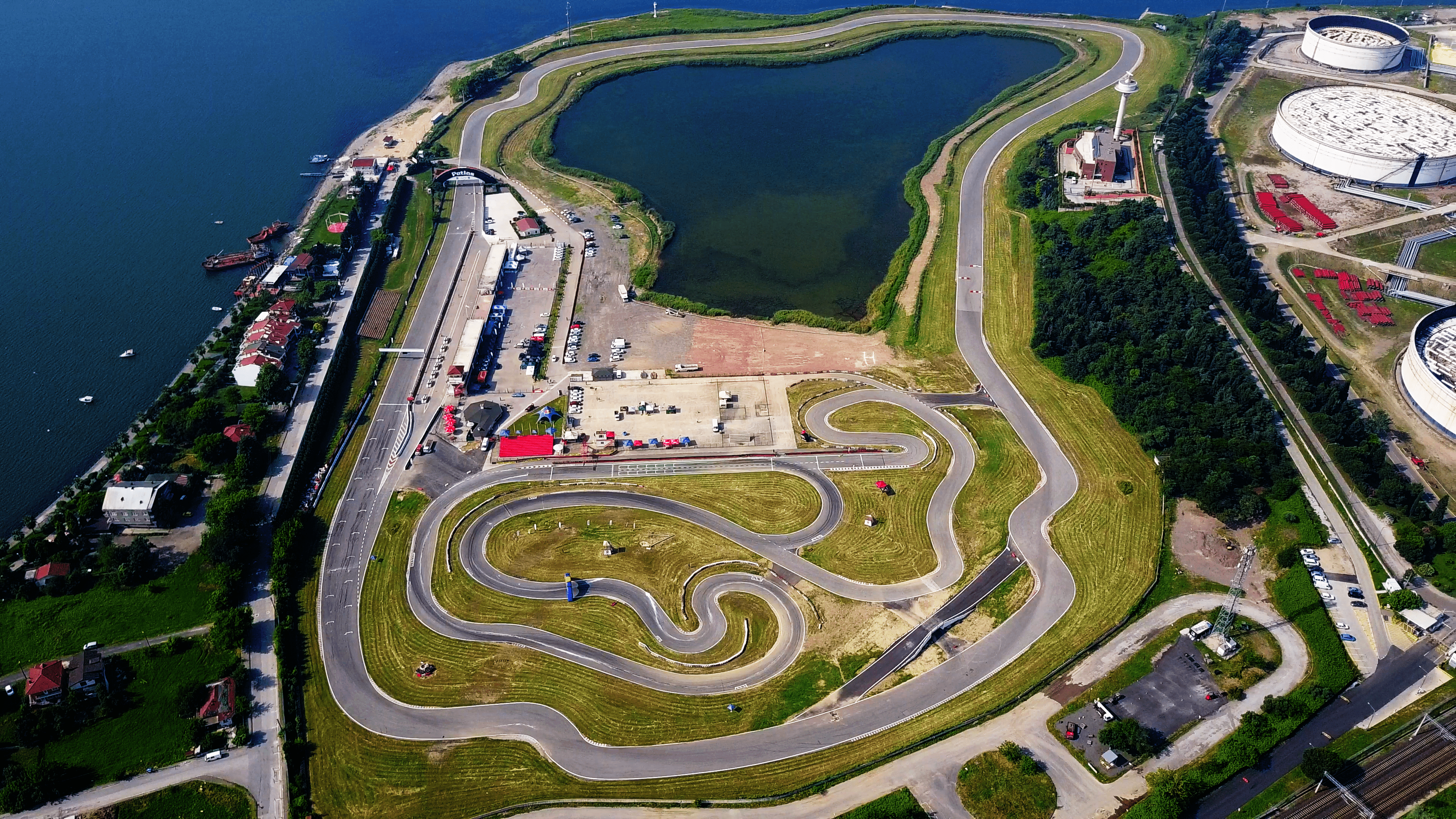
Overhead view of the circuit

İzmit Körfez Circuit (Turkish: İzmit Körfez Yarış Pisti) is a motor sports race track about 17 km (11 mi) west of İzmit, in Körfez district of Kocaeli Province, Turkey. Sponsored by the Turkish Automobile Sports Federation (TOSFED) and built by the Istanbul Motorsports Club (İMK), it was inaugurated in 1993 as the first asphalted race track in Turkey. The venue is home to motor sport races in various categories.

Located at the northeastern coast of Marmara Sea, İzmit Körfez Circuit is situated around a small Fener Lake (Fenergölü), which belongs to the Municipality of Körfez District. The venue can be easily reached from Istanbul and İzmit by the motorway O-4 or highway D-100 at the exit Körfez. The race track, 1.950 km (1.212 mi) at length, has nine turns and runs clockwise.

The circuit provides the greatest number of motor sport racing events in Turkey. In addition to Turkish championships, several racing organizations of private companies as well as various motor sport types in different categories are held here. On an average racing day, several events are carried out in five to six categories. The circuit is used also for test runs by motor magazines, tire and motor companies. Some motorcycle and auto racing schools train here also. Around 5,000 spectators in every age group come to the circuit on racing days. Events at the race track find growing interest in the TV and press.

== Events ==
Scheduled racing events throughout the year include

Karting

- Karting Mini, Junior, Super championships

Auto

- Street car drag racing
- Formula 3 championship

Motorcycle

- Superbike A, B championships
- Supersport A, B, C championships
- Supermoto A, B championships
- Honda 125cc, 250cc Cup

== Accident ==
The renowned Turkish motorcycle racer Sinan Sofuoğlu died on May 9, 2008, in a nearby hospital after a fall-off with severe injuries and traumas he suffered during a training session at the race track.

== See also ==
- İzmit Körfezi
- Istanbul Park
