= Nazlı Tolga =

Turkish-Dutch journalist and television host

- Born: 8 November 1979 (age 46); Ankara, Turkey
- Education: Marmara University, Faculty of Communication
- Occupations: Journalist, TV presenter, teacher
- Years active: 1998–2013
- Spouse: Lawrence Brenninkmeyer
- Website: http://www.nazlitolga.com

Nazlı Tolga (born 8 November 1979) is a Turkish-Dutch journalist, educator and television host. Tolga was the anchorwoman of the leading local and foreign affairs programme FOX Ana Haber and Nazlı Tolga ile Haber Masası.

Nazlı Tolga was born in Ankara, Turkey. She was born into a Muslim-Turkish family from Samsun and Malatya. She is fluent in Turkish, Dutch, Brazilian Portuguese, and English. After completing her elementary and high school education in American College of Istanbul, she attended Marmara University, Faculty of Communication–the leading institution of communication education and studies in Turkey. She studied at the Department of Journalism. Tolga started her journalism career at Kanal D Haber in 1998. She worked in Show TV, Skyturk, and Fox. She married Dutch businessman Lawrence Brenninkmeyer at the Cathedral of the Holy Spirit in Istanbul on August 31, 2013. She lives in Brazil, London, and Shanghai. She is a Roman Catholic since 2013. In the past years, Tolga became the mother of two baby girls.

== TV programmes ==
- Kanal D Gece Haberleri (Kanal D, 1998–2002)
- Nazlı Tolga ile Haber Masası (Skyturk, 2004 – September 2007)
- Show Haber (2002–2003)
- FOX ON Ana Haber (2008–2010)
- Nazlı Tolga ile Fox Ana Haber (3 September 2007 – 14 June 2013)
