= Sofuoğlu =

Sofuoğlu is a surname. Notable people with the surname include:

- Ali Sofuoğlu (born 1995), Turkish karateka
- Bahattin Sofuoğlu (1978–2002), Turkish motorcycle racer
- Bahattin Sofuoğlu (2003) (born 2003), Turkish motorcycle racer
- Kenan Sofuoğlu (born 1983), Turkish motorcycle racer
- Sinan Sofuoğlu (1982–2008), Turkish motorcycle racer
- Turan Sofuoğlu (born 1965), Turkish football player

== Other uses ==
- Sofuoğlu family, Turkish motorcycle enthusiasts and racers
- Sofuoğlu, Yapraklı
