= MV Agusta Reparto Corse =

(Italy) MV Agusta Reparto Corse
- 2025 name: MV Agusta Reparto Corse
- Rider(s): WorldSSP: 11. (Netherlands) Bo Bendsneyder; 77. (Italy) Filippo Farioli
- Motorcycle: Supersport: MV Agusta F3 800 RR
- Tyres: Pirelli

MV Agusta Reparto Corse is MV Agusta's factory motorbike racing team. MV Agusta Reparto Corse formerly competed in the Superbike World Championship. The team currently competes in the Supersport World Championship.

== History ==
Giovanni Castiglioni, chairman and President of MV Agusta, signed an agreement with Alexander Yakhnich, Chairman of Yakhnich Motorsport, to establish the new MV Agusta Reparto Corse for the 2014 season. The team was operated by Yakhnich Motorsport and competed in the World Supersport and World Superbike Championships.

In June 2014 Castiglioni and Yakhnich signed an agreement which stipulates that MV Agusta will take over all operations concerning the racing team.

MV Agusta Reparto Corse partnered with Team Vamag in late 2017 in preparation for the 2018 Supersport World Championship. The team was known as MV Agusta Reparto Corse by Vamag that season.

== Superbike World Championship ==
For the 2014 WSBK Season, Claudio Corti rode a race-prepared MV Agusta F4 for the team and finished 17th in the championship. Leon Camier substituted for Corti at Laguna Seca.

In 2015, 2016 and 2017, Leon Camier was the rider for the team, finishing 13th, 8th and 8th in the Championship in these years.

Jordi Torres was the team's rider except for the last two races, where Maximilian Scheib rode. Torres finished 13th in the championship and Scheib 26th.

=== WSBK Results ===
Year	Rider	1		2		3		4		5		6		7		8		9		10		11		12		13		Pos.	Pts
Year	Rider	R1	R2	R1	R2	R1	R2	R1	R2	R1	R2	R1	R2	R1	R2	R1	R2	R1	R2	R1	R2	R1	R2	R1	R2	R1	R2	Pos.	Pts
2014	Claudio Corti	AUS; 13	AUS; 18	SPA; Ret	SPA; Ret	NED; 14	NED; Ret	ITA; 18	ITA; Ret	GBR; 15	GBR; 12	MAL; Ret	MAL; DNS	SMR; 13	SMR; 17	POR; DNS	POR; DNS	USA	USA	SPA; 15	SPA; Ret	FRA; 13	FRA; 8	QAT; Ret	QAT; 14			17th	27
2014	Leon Camier	AUS	AUS	SPA	SPA	NED	NED	ITA	ITA	GBR	GBR	MAL	MAL	SMR	SMR	POR	POR	USA; 15	USA; 10	SPA	SPA	FRA	FRA	QAT	QAT			(16th)	7 (37)
2015	Leon Camier	AUS; 10	AUS; 8	THA; Ret	THA; Ret	SPA; 10	SPA; 15	NED; 10	NED; 10	ITA; Ret	ITA; Ret	GBR; 9	GBR; Ret	POR; Ret	POR; Ret	ITA; 13	ITA; 16	USA; 10	USA; 10	MAL; 13	MAL; 12	SPA; 9	SPA; 8	FRA; 5	FRA; 15	QAT; Ret	QAT; Ret	13th	89
2016	Leon Camier	AUS; 7	AUS; Ret	THA; 11	THA; 11	SPA; Ret	SPA; 16	NED; 4	NED; 9	ITA; 6	ITA; 5	MAL; 10	MAL; 9	GBR; 4	GBR; 5	ITA; 8	ITA; Ret	USA; 11	USA; DNS	GER; 5	GER; 4	FRA; 7	FRA; 4	SPA; 7	SPA; Ret	QAT; 18	QAT; 13	8th	168
2017	Leon Camier	AUS; 5	AUS; 8	THA; 8	THA; Ret	SPA; 11	SPA; 10	NED; 10	NED; 6	ITA; 6	ITA; Ret	GBR; 6	GBR; 6	ITA; 11	ITA; Ret	USA; 6	USA; Ret	GER; 5	GER; 6	POR; 4	POR; Ret	FRA; 4	FRA; Ret	SPA; 12	SPA; 12	QAT; 9	QAT; 9	8th	168
2018	Jordi Torres	AUS; Ret	AUS; 8	THA; 10	THA; Ret	SPA; Ret	SPA; 8	NED; 9	NED; 6	ITA; 14	ITA; 5	GBR; 11	GBR; 9	CZE; Ret	CZE; Ret	USA; 9	USA; 7	ITA; 18	ITA; Ret	POR; 7	POR; 13	FRA; 12	FRA; 14	ARG	ARG	QAT	QAT	13th	98
2018	Maximilian Scheib	AUS	AUS	THA	THA	SPA	SPA	NED	NED	ITA	ITA	GBR	GBR	CZE	CZE	USA	USA	ITA	ITA	POR	POR	FRA	FRA	ARG; 13	ARG; Ret	QAT; Ret	QAT; C	26th	3

== Supersport World Championship ==
MV Agusta Corse Clienti
- 2021 name: MV Agusta Corse Clienti
- Race riders: Supersport World Championship: 66 (Finland) Niki Tuuli
- Motorcycle: MV Agusta F4 RR / RC; MV Agusta F3 800 RC; MV Agusta F3 675 RC
- Tyres: Pirelli
- Riders' Championships: WorldSSP Challenge: 2022: Bahattin Sofuoğlu

For the 2014 Supersport World Championship Reparto Corse fielded riders Jules Cluzel and Vladimir Leonov on race-prepared F3 675s. Leonov was replaced by Massimo Roccoli from the Misano round onwards. Cluzel scored 3 wins for the team and finished 2nd in the championship this season.

Jules Cluzel and Lorenzo Zanetti rode for Reparto Corse in 2015, Cluzel winning 3 races. Due to injury, Cluzel was replaced by Nicolás Terol for the last three rounds.

In 2016, Cluzel and Zanetti were retained by Reparto Corse, Cluzel winning 2 races. Massimo Roccoli rode instead of Cluzel in the last race in Qatar.

P. J. Jacobsen and Alessandro Zaccone rode for Reparto Corse in 2017.

MV Agusta Reparto Corse partnered with Team Vamag in late 2017 in preparation for the 2018 Supersport World Championship. The team was known as MV Agusta Reparto Corse by Vamag that season. Raffaele De Rosa and Ayrton Badovini were the two riders for the team.

In 2019 Raffaele De Rosa was retained by Reparto Corse and joined by Federico Fuligni.

=== WorldSSP Results ===
(key) (Races in bold indicate pole position; races in italics indicate fastest lap)

Year	Team	No	Rider	1	2	3	4	5	6	7	8	9	10	11	12	Pos	Pts	Constructors	
Year	Team	No	Rider	1	2	3	4	5	6	7	8	9	10	11	12	Pos	Pts	Pos	Pts
2013	ParkinGO MV Agusta Corse	21	(United Kingdom) Christian Iddon	AUS; 21	ESP; Ret	NED; 11	ITA; 13	GBR; Ret	POR; 10	ITA; DNS	GBR; 5	GER; 12	TUR; Ret	FRA; 3	ESP; Ret	15th	45	4th	104
2013	ParkinGO MV Agusta Corse	47	(Italy) Roberto Rolfo	AUS; Ret	ESP; 9	NED; 6	ITA; 11	GBR; 3	POR; Ret	ITA; 14	GBR; 6	GER; 15	TUR; 5	FRA; Ret	ESP; 3	6th	7	4th	104
2014	MV Agusta RC–Yakhnich M. MV Agusta Reparto Corse	16	(France) Jules Cluzel	AUS; 1	ESP; Ret	NED; 3	**ITA**; 15	GBR; 2	**MAL**; 2	**ITA**; 1	POR; Ret	ESP; Ret	**FRA**; 1	**QAT**; 3		2nd	148	3rd	162
2014	MV Agusta RC–Yakhnich M. MV Agusta Reparto Corse	65	(Russia) Vladimir Leonov	AUS; Ret	ESP; 8	NED; 12	ITA; Ret	GBR; 15	MAL; 14	ITA	POR	ESP	FRA	QAT		19th	15 (19)	3rd	162
2014	MV Agusta RC–Yakhnich M. MV Agusta Reparto Corse	155	(Italy) Massimo Roccoli	AUS	ESP	NED	ITA	GBR	MAL	ITA; 14	POR; 10	ESP; Ret	FRA; 15	QAT; 10		20th	15	3rd	162
2014	ATK Racing	25	(Italy) Alex Baldolini	AUS	ESP	NED	ITA; Ret	GBR	MAL	ITA; 19	POR; Ret	ESP	FRA	QAT		NC	0	3rd	162
2015	MV Agusta Reparto Corse	16	(France) Jules Cluzel	**AUS**; 1	THA; Ret	**ESP**; Ret	**NED**; 2	**ITA**; 2	GBR; 2	**POR**; 1	**ITA**; 1	MAL; 2	ESP; WD	FRA	QAT	4th	155	3rd	218
2015	MV Agusta Reparto Corse	87	(Italy) Lorenzo Zanetti	AUS; 2	THA; Ret	ESP; 5	NED; 6	ITA; 3	GBR; 4	POR; 5	ITA; 3	MAL; 3	ESP; 3	FRA; 4	QAT; 3	3rd	158	3rd	218
2015	MV Agusta Reparto Corse	88	(Spain) Nicolás Terol	AUS	THA	ESP	NED	ITA	GBR	POR	ITA	MAL	ESP; 5	FRA; 14	QAT; 6	18th	23	3rd	218
2015	Race Department ATK#25	25	(Italy) Alex Baldolini	AUS; 7	THA; 9	ESP; 6	NED; 9	ITA; Ret	GBR; Ret	POR; Ret	ITA; 5	MAL; 10	ESP; 7	FRA; Ret	QAT; 8	8th	67	3rd	218
2015	Team Factory Vamag	53	(Italy) Nicola Jr. Morrentino	AUS	THA	ESP	NED	ITA	GBR	POR	ITA	MAL	ESP; Ret	FRA	QAT	NC	0	3rd	218
2015	GRT Racing Team	95	(Czech Republic) Miroslav Popov	AUS	THA	ESP	NED	ITA	GBR	POR	ITA	MAL	ESP; 18	FRA	QAT	NC	0	3rd	218
2015	MV Agusta Reparto Corse	16	(France) Jules Cluzel	AUS; 17	**THA**; 1	ESP; 4	NED; 18	**ITA**; 2	MAL; 7	GBR; 8	ITA; Ret	GER; 3	FRA; 1	ESP; 6	QAT; 3	2nd	142	3rd	203
2015	MV Agusta Reparto Corse	52	(Italy) Massimo Roccoli	AUS	THA	ESP	NED	ITA	MAL	GBR	ITA	GER	FRA	ESP	QAT; 9	27th	7	3rd	203
2015	MV Agusta Reparto Corse	87	(Italy) Lorenzo Zanetti	AUS; Ret	THA; 8	ESP; Ret	NED; 29	ITA; DSQ	MAL; 13	GBR; 10	ITA; 5	GER; 7	FRA; 9	ESP	QAT	13th	44 (50)	3rd	203
2015	GRT Racing Team	4	(United Kingdom) Gino Rea	AUS; 7	THA; 9	ESP; Ret	NED; 2	ITA; Ret	MAL; 3	GBR; 4	ITA; 3	GER; Ret	FRA; Ret	ESP; WD	QAT	7th	81	3rd	203
2015	GRT Racing Team	41	(Australia) Aiden Wagner	AUS; 10	THA; 15	ESP; Ret	NED; DNQ	ITA; 17	MAL; 16	GBR; 19	ITA; 14	GER	FRA	ESP	QAT	26th	9	3rd	203
2015	GRT Racing Team	65	(Italy) Michael Canducci	AUS	THA	ESP	NED	ITA	MAL	GBR	ITA	GER; 23	FRA; Ret	ESP; 17	QAT; Ret	NC	0	3rd	203
2015	GRT Racing Team	87	(Italy) Lorenzo Zanetti	AUS	THA	ESP	NED	ITA	MAL	GBR	ITA	GER	FRA	ESP; 10	QAT; Ret	13th	6 (50)	3rd	203
2015	Race Department ATK#25	25	(Italy) Alex Baldolini	AUS; 6	THA; 6	ESP; Ret	NED; 5	ITA; 4	MAL; 9	GBR; 7	ITA; 6	GER; 12	FRA; DNS	ESP	QAT; 10	8th	80	3rd	203
2015	Team Factory Vamag	44	(Italy) Roberto Rolfo	AUS; 9	THA; 18	ESP; Ret	NED; 22	ITA; 14	MAL; 12	GBR; 14	ITA; Ret	GER; 18	FRA; 16	ESP; Ret	QAT; Ret	24th	15	3rd	203
2015	Ellan Vannin Motorsport	57	(Italy) Ilario Dionisi	AUS	THA	ESP	NED	ITA	MAL	GBR	ITA; 17	GER	FRA	ESP	QAT	NC	0	3rd	203
2015	Schmidt Racing	77	(United Kingdom) Kyle Ryde	AUS	THA	ESP	NED	ITA	MAL	GBR; 21	ITA; 22	GER	FRA	ESP	QAT	25th	0 (15)	3rd	203
2015	Schmidt Racing	88	(Spain) Nicolás Terol	AUS; 11	THA; Ret	ESP; 3	NED; 13	ITA; 9	MAL; Ret	GBR; Ret	ITA; 18	GER	FRA	ESP	QAT	17th	31	3rd	203
2017	MV Agusta Reparto Corse	61	(Italy) Alessandro Zaccone	AUS	THA	ESP; Ret	NED; 18	ITA; 10	GBR; Ret	ITA; 11	GER; 14	POR; Ret	FRA; Ret	ESP; 12	QAT	23rd	17	4th	145
2017	MV Agusta Reparto Corse	99	(United States) P. J. Jacobsen	**AUS**; 6	THA; Ret	**ESP**; 3	NED; 4	**ITA**; 3	GBR; Ret	ITA; 4	GER; Ret	POR; 5	FRA; 3	ESP; 4	QAT; Ret	6th	108	4th	145
2017	Race Department ATK#25	7	(Italy) Davide Pizzoli	AUS; Ret	THA; 14	ESP; DNS	NED; Ret	ITA; Ret	GBR	ITA	GER	POR	FRA	ESP	QAT	37th	2	4th	145
2017	Race Department ATK#25	25	(Italy) Alex Baldolini	AUS; 13	THA; DNS	ESP	NED	ITA; Ret	GBR; 16	ITA; DNS	GER; Ret	POR; DNS	FRA	ESP	QAT	31st	3 (8)	4th	145
2017	Race Department ATK#25	69	(Andorra) Xavier Cardelús	AUS	THA	ESP; 13	NED	ITA	GBR; Ret	ITA	GER; DNS	POR	FRA	ESP	QAT	36th	3 (5)	4th	145
2017	Team Factory Vamag	44	(Italy) Roberto Rolfo	AUS; 1	THA; 11	ESP; 6	NED; 15	ITA; Ret	GBR; 14	ITA; 18	GER	POR	FRA	ESP	QAT	12th	43	4th	145
2017	Team Factory Vamag	87	(Italy) Lorenzo Zanetti	AUS	THA	ESP	NED	ITA	GBR	ITA	GER; 6	POR; 8	FRA; 6	ESP; 17	QAT; 11	16th	33	4th	145
2017	Team Factory Vamag	163	(Italy) Davide Stirpe	AUS	THA	ESP	NED	ITA	GBR	ITA; Ret	GER	POR	FRA	ESP	QAT	NC	0	4th	145
2018	MV Agusta Reparto Corse by Vamag	3	(Italy) Raffaele De Rosa	AUS; 6	THA; 7	SPA; Ret	NED; 3	ITA; 3	GBR; 3	CZE; 3	MIS; 2	POR; 4	FRA; 7	ARG; Ret	QAT; 8	6th	133	2nd	138
2018	MV Agusta Reparto Corse by Vamag	86	(Italy) Ayrton Badovini	AUS; 9	THA; 15	SPA; Ret	NED; 12	ITA; Ret	GBR; 7	CZE; Ret	MIS; 10	POR; 8	FRA; 12	ARG; 11	QAT; 11	11th	49	2nd	138
2018	Extreme Racing Bardahl	63	(Italy) Davide Stirpe	AUS	THA	SPA	NED	ITA; DNS	GBR	CZE	MIS; 16	POR	FRA	ARG	QAT	NC	0	2nd	138
2019	MV Agusta Reparto Corse	3	(Italy) Raffaele De Rosa	AUS; 18	THA; 5	SPA; 2	NED; Ret	ITA; 3	SPA; 5	MIS; Ret	GBR; 5	POR; Ret	FRA; 4	ARG; 6	QAT; 7	6th	101	3rd	109
2019	MV Agusta Reparto Corse	22	(Italy) Federico Fuligni	AUS; Ret	THA; Ret	SPA; 13	NED; 15	ITA; 14	SPA; Ret	MIS; 11	GBR; 18	POR; 14	FRA; Ret	ARG	QAT	17th	13	3rd	109
2019	MV Agusta Reparto Corse	22	(Italy) Filippo Fuligni	AUS	THA	SPA	NED	ITA	SPA	MIS	GBR	POR	FRA	ARG; 22	QAT; DNS	NC	0	3rd	109

Year	Team	Bike	No.	Riders	1		2		3		4		5		6		7		8		9		10		11		12		RC	Points	TC	Points	MC	Points
Year	Team	Bike	No.	Riders	R1	R2	R1	R2	R1	R2	R1	R2	R1	R2	R1	R2	R1	R2	R1	R2	R1	R2	R1	R2	R1	R2	R1	R2	RC	Points	TC	Points	MC	Points
2020	MV Agusta Reparto Corse	MV Agusta F3 675	1	(Switzerland) Randy Krummenacher	PHI; DSQ		JER	JER	POR	POR	ARA	ARA	ARA	ARA	CAT	CAT	MAG	MAG	EST	EST									NC	0	5th	167	3rd	140
2020	MV Agusta Reparto Corse	MV Agusta F3 675	3	(Italy) Raffaele De Rosa	PHI; DSQ		JER; 5	JER; 5	POR; 3	POR; 12	ARA; 4	ARA; 3	ARA; 2	ARA; Ret	CAT; 14	CAT; 4	MAG; 4	MAG; Ret	EST; Ret	EST; 3									6th	135	5th	167	3rd	140
2020	MV Agusta Reparto Corse	MV Agusta F3 675	22	(Italy) Federico Fuligni	PHI; DSQ		JER; 13	JER; 14	POR; Ret	POR; 16	ARA; 12	ARA; 12	ARA; 10	ARA; 14	CAT; 17	CAT; Ret	MAG; 8	MAG; Ret	EST; 13	EST; 17									18th	32	5th	167	3rd	140
2021	MV Agusta Corse Clienti	MV Agusta F3 675	66	(Finland) Niki Tuuli	SPA; Ret	SPA; DNS	POR; 11	POR; 8	ITA; 9	ITA; Ret	NED; Ret	NED; 8	CZE; 9	CZE; 8	SPA; 10	SPA; 7	FRA; Ret	FRA; 5	SPA; 19	SPA; 3	SPA; C	SPA; 3	POR; 5	POR; Ret	ARG; 8	ARG; Ret	INA; Ret	INA; 2	11th	140	9th	140	3rd	140
2021	Extreme Racing Service	MV Agusta F3 675	63	(Italy) Davide Stirpe	SPA	SPA	POR	POR	ITA; 20	ITA; 16	NED	NED	CZE	CZE	SPA	SPA	FRA	FRA	SPA	SPA	SPA	SPA	POR	POR	ARG	ARG	INA	INA	NC	0	28th	0	3rd	140
2022	MV Agusta Reparto Corse	MV Agusta F3 800 RR	27	(Italy) Mattia Casadei	SPA	SPA	NED	NED	POR	POR	ITA; 8	ITA; 8	GBR; 12	GBR; 11	CZE	CZE	FRA	FRA	SPA	SPA	POR	POR	ARG	ARG	INA	INA	AUS	AUS	23rd	25	5th	258	5th	205
2022	MV Agusta Reparto Corse	MV Agusta F3 800 RR	54	(Turkey) Bahattin Sofuoğlu	SPA; 12	SPA; 14	NED; 15	NED; 10	POR; 23	POR; 14	ITA; 21	ITA; 18	GBR; 15	GBR; Ret	CZE; 7	CZE; 5	FRA; Ret	FRA; DNS	SPA; 5	SPA; 7	POR; 11	POR; 5	ARG	ARG	INA	INA	AUS	AUS	14th	72	5th	258	5th	205
2022	MV Agusta Reparto Corse	MV Agusta F3 800 RR	66	(Finland) Niki Tuuli	SPA; 6	SPA; 5	NED; 6	NED; 7	POR; Ret	POR; DNS	ITA	ITA	GBR	GBR	CZE; 6	CZE; 10	FRA; 6	FRA; 11	SPA; 6	SPA; 5	POR; 5	POR; Ret	ARG; 5	ARG; 4	**INA**; 1	**INA**; Ret	AUS; Ret	AUS; Ret	8th	152	5th	258	5th	205
2022	MV Agusta Reparto Corse	MV Agusta F3 800 RR	92	(Germany) Marcel Schrötter	SPA	SPA	NED	NED	POR	POR	ITA	ITA	GBR	GBR	CZE	CZE	FRA	FRA	SPA	SPA	POR	POR	ARG	ARG	INA	INA	AUS; Ret	AUS; 7	29th	9	5th	258	5th	205
2023	MV Agusta Reparto Corse	MV Agusta F3 800 RR	23	(Germany) Marcel Schrötter	AUS; 7	AUS; 4	INA; 4	INA; 5	NED; 2	NED; 4	SPA; 2	SPA; 2	EMI; 4	EMI; 3	GBR; 8	GBR; Ret	ITA; 2	ITA; 8	CZE; 6	CZE; 2	FRA; 7	FRA; 4	SPA; 2	SPA; 5	POR; 4	POR; 4	ARG; 15	ARG; Ret	3rd	294	3rd	462	3rd	315
2023	MV Agusta Reparto Corse	MV Agusta F3 800 RR	54	(Turkey) Bahattin Sofuoğlu	AUS; Ret	AUS; 11	INA; 9	INA; 10	NED; 11	NED; Ret	SPA; 3	SPA; 1	EMI; Ret	EMI; 7	GBR; 13	GBR; 8	ITA; 4	ITA; Ret	CZE; 3	CZE; 3	FRA; 9	FRA; Ret	SPA; 6	SPA; 4	POR; 7	POR; 17	ARG; 16	ARG; Ret	6th	168	3rd	462	3rd	315
2023	Extreme Racing Service	MV Agusta F3 800 RR	13	(Italy) Luca Ottaviani	AUS	AUS	INA	INA	NED	NED	SPA	SPA	EMI	EMI	GBR	GBR	ITA; 12	ITA; Ret	CZE	CZE	FRA	FRA	SPA	SPA	POR	POR	ARG	ARG	37th	4	24th	4	3rd	315
2024	MV Agusta Corse Clienti	MV Agusta F3 800 RR	11	(Netherlands) Bo Bendsneyder	AUS	AUS	SPA	SPA	NED	NED	EMI	EMI	GBR	GBR	CZE	CZE	POR	POR	FRA	FRA	ITA	ITA	SPA	SPA	POR; 8	POR; 5	SPA; 7	SPA; 3	18th	44	4th	354	3rd	293
2024	MV Agusta Corse Clienti	MV Agusta F3 800 RR	23	(Germany) Marcel Schrötter	AUS; 3	AUS; 2	SPA; 3	SPA; 2	NED; 12	NED; 8	EMI; 6	EMI; 6	GBR; Ret	GBR; 11	CZE; 7	CZE; 9	POR; 7	POR; 8	FRA; 17	FRA; 10	ITA; 4	ITA; 4	SPA; 11	SPA; 7	POR; 6	POR; 10	SPA; 4	SPA; 5	5th	228	4th	354	3rd	293
2024	MV Agusta Corse Clienti	MV Agusta F3 800 RR	54	(Turkey) Bahattin Sofuoğlu	AUS; 6	AUS; 6	SPA; 10	SPA; 6	NED; 8	NED; 5	ITA; Ret	ITA; Ret	GBR; 6	GBR; Ret	CZE; Ret	CZE; Ret	POR; DNS	POR; DNS	FRA; 16	FRA; Ret	ITA; 10	ITA; 11	SPA; 10	SPA; Ret	POR	POR	SPA	SPA	12th	82 (103)	4th	354	3rd	293
2024	Extreme Racing Service	MV Agusta F3 800 RR	13	(Italy) Luca Ottaviani	AUS	AUS	SPA	SPA	NED	NED	EMI; 11	EMI; 12	GBR	GBR	CZE	CZE	POR	POR	FRA	FRA	ITA; Ret	ITA; 13	SPA	SPA	POR	POR	SPA	SPA	25th	12	19th	12	3rd	293
2024	Motozoo ME AIR Racing	MV Agusta F3 800 RR	64	(Italy) Federico Caricasulo	AUS; 4	AUS; 4	SPA; 6	SPA; 8	NED; 6	NED; 22	ITA; 7	ITA; 7	GBR; 16	GBR; 15	CZE; 5	CZE; 6	POR; 5	POR; 4	FRA; 2	FRA; Ret	ITA; Ret	ITA; 6	SPA; 8	SPA; 9	POR; 5	POR; 6	SPA; 24	SPA; Ret	7th	184	6th	190	3rd	293
2024	Motozoo ME AIR Racing	MV Agusta F3 800 RR	68	(Australia) Luke Power	AUS	AUS	SPA; 18	SPA; 20	NED; 10	NED; Ret	EMI; Ret	EMI; 20	GBR; Ret	GBR; 18	CZE; 16	CZE; 16	POR; 18	POR; 22	FRA; Ret	FRA; 17	ITA; 20	ITA; 23	SPA; 22	SPA; 22	POR; Ret	POR; Ret	SPA; 20	SPA; Ret	31st	6	6th	190	3rd	293
2025	MV Agusta Reparto Corse	MV Agusta F3 800 RR	11	(Netherlands) Bo Bendsneyder	**AUS**; 4	AUS; 3	POR; 3	POR; 1	NED; 1	NED; 3	ITA; 7	ITA; 5	CZE; 8	CZE; 10	EMI; 13	EMI; 8	GBR; 28	GBR; 17	**HUN**; 3	HUN; 16	FRA; 10	FRA; 17	ARA; 31	ARA; 19	POR	POR	SPA	SPA	9th	178	6th	276	4th	259
2025	MV Agusta Reparto Corse	MV Agusta F3 800 RR	70	(United Kingdom) Joshua Whatley	AUS	AUS	POR	POR	NED	NED	ITA	ITA	CZE	CZE	EMI	EMI	GBR	GBR	HUN	HUN	FRA	FRA	ARA	ARA	POR; 21	POR; 22	SPA; 19	SPA; Ret	45th	0	6th	276	4th	259
2025	MV Agusta Reparto Corse	MV Agusta F3 800 RR	77	(Italy) Filippo Farioli	AUS; WD	AUS; WD	POR; 15	POR; 12	NED; 11	NED; 21	ITA; 8	ITA; 6	CZE; NC	CZE; 13	EMI; NC	EMI; Ret	GBR; NC	GBR; 13	HUN; 4	HUN; Ret	FRA; 7	FRA; 7	ARA; 5	ARA; 8	POR; 11	POR; Ret	SPA; 14	SPA; 9	11th	98	6th	276	4th	259
2025	Motozoo ME air Racing	MV Agusta F3 800 RR	40	(Italy) Mattia Casadei	AUS	AUS	POR	POR	NED	NED	ITA	ITA	CZE	CZE	EMI; 11	EMI; 7	GBR; 8	GBR; 10	HUN; Ret	HUN; 9	FRA	FRA	**ARA**; 11	ARA; Ret	POR; 27	POR; 17	**SPA**; 6	SPA; 5	20th	61	12th	100	4th	259
2025	Motozoo ME air Racing	MV Agusta F3 800 RR	55	(Italy) Mattia Volpi	AUS	AUS	POR	POR	NED	NED	ITA	ITA	CZE	CZE	EMI	EMI	GBR	GBR	HUN	HUN	FRA; 18	FRA; 19	ARA	ARA	EST	EST	SPA	SPA	39th	0	12th	100	4th	259
2025	Motozoo ME air Racing	MV Agusta F3 800 RR	64	(Italy) Federico Caricasulo	AUS	AUS	POR; 10	POR; 28	NED; 13	NED; 9	**ITA**; 14	ITA; 9	CZE; 25	CZE; 11	EMI	EMI	GBR	GBR	HUN	HUN	FRA	FRA	ARA	ARA	POR	POR	SPA	SPA	18th	30 (64)	12th	100	4th	259
2025	Motozoo ME air Racing	MV Agusta F3 800 RR	68	(Australia) Luke Power	AUS; 12	AUS; 11	POR; DNS	POR; DNS	NED; 21	NED; 17	ITA; 20	ITA; Ret	CZE; 22	CZE; 18	EMI; Ret	EMI; Ret	GBR; 19	GBR; Ret	HUN; 19	HUN; 24	FRA; 16	FRA; 21	ARA; DNS	ARA; DNS	POR	POR	SPA	SPA	28th	9	12th	100	4th	259
2025	Team Flembbo – Pilote Moto Production	MV Agusta F3 800 RR	4	(France) Loic Arbel	AUS; 16	AUS; 17	POR; Ret	POR; 24	NED; Ret	NED; DNS	ITA	ITA	CZE	CZE	EMI	EMI	GBR	GBR	HUN	HUN	FRA; 19	FRA; NC	ARA; Ret	ARA; 25	POR; 26	POR; 27	SPA; 24	SPA; 20	34th	0	NC	0	4th	259
2025	Team Flembbo – Pilote Moto Production	MV Agusta F3 800 RR	9	(France) Andy Verdoïa	AUS	AUS	POR	POR	NED	NED	ITA; Ret	ITA; 24	CZE; Ret	CZE; 19	EMI	EMI	GBR	GBR	HUN	HUN	FRA	FRA	ARA	ARA	EST	EST	SPA	SPA	46th	0	NC	0	4th	259
2025	Team Flembbo – Pilote Moto Production	MV Agusta F3 800 RR	74	(Poland) Piotr Biesiekirski	AUS	AUS	POR	POR	NED	NED	ITA	ITA	CZE	CZE	EMI; 26	EMI; 21	GBR; 23	GBR; 24	HUN; 17	HUN; Ret	FRA	FRA	ARA	ARA	POR	POR	SPA	SPA	37th	0	NC	0	4th	259
