= 2005 Italian motorcycle Grand Prix =

Motorcycle race

(Italy) 2005 Italian Grand Prix
Race details
- Race 5 of 17 races in the 2005 Grand Prix motorcycle racing season
- Date: 5 June 2005
- Official name: Gran Premio Alice d'Italia
- Location: Mugello Circuit
- Course: Permanent racing facility; 5.245 km (3.259 mi)

MotoGP
Pole position
- Rider: (Italy) Valentino Rossi
- Time: 1:49.223
Fastest lap
- Rider: (Italy) Max Biaggi
- Time: 1:50.117 on lap 5
Podium
- First: (Italy) Valentino Rossi
- Second: (Italy) Max Biaggi
- Third: (Italy) Loris Capirossi

250cc
Pole position
- Rider: (Spain) Jorge Lorenzo
- Time: 1:53.494
Fastest lap
- Rider: (San Marino) Alex de Angelis
- Time: 1:54.332 on lap 4
Podium
- First: (Spain) Daniel Pedrosa
- Second: (Spain) Jorge Lorenzo
- Third: (San Marino) Alex de Angelis

125cc
Pole position
- Rider: (Finland) Mika Kallio
- Time: 1:58.662
Fastest lap
- Rider: (Spain) Héctor Faubel
- Time: 1:59.464 on lap 4
Podium
- First: (Hungary) Gábor Talmácsi
- Second: (Switzerland) Thomas Lüthi
- Third: (Spain) Joan Olivé

The 2005 Italian motorcycle Grand Prix was the fifth round of the 2005 MotoGP Championship. It took place on the weekend of 3–5 June 2005 at the Mugello Circuit.

== MotoGP classification ==
Pos.	No.	Rider	Team	Manufacturer	Laps	Time/Retired	Grid	Points
1	46	(Italy) Valentino Rossi	Gauloises Yamaha Team	Yamaha	23	42:42.994	1	25
2	3	(Italy) Max Biaggi	Repsol Honda Team	Honda	23	+0.359	3	20
3	65	(Italy) Loris Capirossi	Ducati Marlboro Team	Ducati	23	+3.874	6	16
4	33	(Italy) Marco Melandri	Movistar Honda MotoGP	Honda	23	+3.979	7	13
5	7	(Spain) Carlos Checa	Ducati Marlboro Team	Ducati	23	+7.898	8	11
6	69	(United States) Nicky Hayden	Repsol Honda Team	Honda	23	+8.204	4	10
7	4	(Brazil) Alex Barros	Camel Honda	Honda	23	+11.572	13	9
8	6	(Japan) Makoto Tamada	Konica Minolta Honda	Honda	23	+25.394	10	8
9	5	(United States) Colin Edwards	Gauloises Yamaha Team	Yamaha	23	+25.485	12	7
10	56	(Japan) Shinya Nakano	Kawasaki Racing Team	Kawasaki	23	+36.549	9	6
11	21	(United States) John Hopkins	Team Suzuki MotoGP	Suzuki	23	+41.637	5	5
12	66	(Germany) Alex Hofmann	Kawasaki Racing Team	Kawasaki	23	+43.659	14	4
13	12	(Australia) Troy Bayliss	Camel Honda	Honda	23	+43.916	17	3
14	11	(Spain) Rubén Xaus	Fortuna Yamaha Team	Yamaha	23	+51.575	15	2
15	10	(United States) Kenny Roberts Jr.	Team Suzuki MotoGP	Suzuki	23	+1:10.275	11	1
16	67	(United Kingdom) Shane Byrne	Team Roberts	Proton KR	23	+1:12.582	18	
17	44	(Italy) Roberto Rolfo	Team d'Antin Pramac	Ducati	23	+1:13.047	19	
18	27	(Italy) Franco Battaini	Blata WCM	Blata	22	+1 lap	21	
19	94	(Spain) David Checa	Fortuna Yamaha Team	Yamaha	22	+1 lap	16	
Ret	15	(Spain) Sete Gibernau	Movistar Honda MotoGP	Honda	5	Accident	2	
Ret	77	(United Kingdom) James Ellison	Blata WCM	Blata	0	Retirement	20	

== 250 cc classification ==
Pos.	No.	Rider	Manufacturer	Laps	Time/Retired	Grid	Points
1	1	(Spain) Daniel Pedrosa	Honda	21	40:31.909	7	25
2	48	(Spain) Jorge Lorenzo	Honda	21	+1.186	1	20
3	5	(San Marino) Alex de Angelis	Aprilia	21	+1.557	5	16
4	27	(Australia) Casey Stoner	Aprilia	21	+1.590	2	13
5	19	(Argentina) Sebastián Porto	Aprilia	21	+6.106	6	11
6	80	(Spain) Héctor Barberá	Honda	21	+8.291	8	10
7	73	(Japan) Hiroshi Aoyama	Honda	21	+11.801	9	9
8	34	(Italy) Andrea Dovizioso	Honda	21	+11.869	3	8
9	24	(Italy) Simone Corsi	Aprilia	21	+21.975	12	7
10	57	(United Kingdom) Chaz Davies	Aprilia	21	+42.381	17	6
11	8	(Italy) Andrea Ballerini	Aprilia	21	+42.499	10	5
12	32	(Italy) Mirko Giansanti	Aprilia	21	+43.082	18	4
13	64	(Czech Republic) Radomil Rous	Honda	21	+1:06.264	23	3
14	38	(France) Grégory Leblanc	Aprilia	21	+1:16.905	20	2
15	9	(France) Hugo Marchand	Aprilia	21	+1:28.269	19	1
16	41	(Spain) Álvaro Molina	Aprilia	21	+1:31.411	28	
17	36	(Colombia) Martín Cárdenas	Aprilia	21	+1:35.652	30	
18	71	(Italy) Jarno Ronzoni	Aprilia	21	+1:39.461	22	
Ret	55	(Japan) Yuki Takahashi	Honda	16	Accident	13	
Ret	12	(Hungary) Gábor Rizmayer	Yamaha	16	Accident	27	
Ret	42	(Austria) Yves Polzer	Aprilia	13	Retirement	24	
Ret	50	(France) Sylvain Guintoli	Aprilia	11	Accident	14	
Ret	96	(Czech Republic) Jakub Smrž	Honda	11	Accident	11	
Ret	18	(Sweden) Fredrik Watz	Yamaha	9	Retirement	29	
Ret	25	(Italy) Alex Baldolini	Aprilia	6	Retirement	15	
Ret	7	(France) Randy de Puniet	Aprilia	5	Accident	4	
Ret	6	(Spain) Alex Debón	Honda	3	Retirement	26	
Ret	15	(Italy) Roberto Locatelli	Aprilia	1	Accident	16	
Ret	21	(France) Arnaud Vincent	Fantic	0	Accident	25	
Ret	28	(Germany) Dirk Heidolf	Honda	0	Retirement	21	
DNQ	20	(Italy) Gabriele Ferro	Fantic		Did not qualify		

== 125 cc classification ==
Pos.	No.	Rider	Manufacturer	Laps	Time/Retired	Grid	Points
1	14	(Hungary) Gábor Talmácsi	KTM	20	40:12.658	2	25
2	12	(Switzerland) Thomas Lüthi	Honda	20	+0.060	6	20
3	6	(Spain) Joan Olivé	Aprilia	20	+14.713	13	16
4	75	(Italy) Mattia Pasini	Aprilia	20	+14.725	4	13
5	71	(Japan) Tomoyoshi Koyama	Honda	20	+15.079	20	11
6	54	(San Marino) Manuel Poggiali	Gilera	20	+18.040	17	10
7	60	(Spain) Julián Simón	KTM	20	+18.200	8	9
8	32	(Italy) Fabrizio Lai	Honda	20	+18.683	9	8
9	9	(Japan) Toshihisa Kuzuhara	Honda	20	+20.133	14	7
10	7	(France) Alexis Masbou	Honda	20	+20.311	22	6
11	61	(Italy) Michele Conti	Honda	20	+28.626	7	5
12	19	(Spain) Álvaro Bautista	Honda	20	+31.791	29	4
13	43	(Spain) Manuel Hernández	Aprilia	20	+31.817	28	3
14	8	(Italy) Lorenzo Zanetti	Aprilia	20	+34.742	16	2
15	35	(Italy) Raffaele De Rosa	Aprilia	20	+34.762	21	1
16	29	(Italy) Andrea Iannone	Aprilia	20	+45.303	30	
17	41	(Spain) Aleix Espargaró	Honda	20	+45.410	23	
18	25	(Germany) Dario Giuseppetti	Aprilia	20	+48.459	35	
19	15	(Italy) Michele Pirro	Malaguti	20	+48.610	18	
20	42	(Italy) Gioele Pellino	Malaguti	20	+48.615	25	
21	18	(Spain) Nicolás Terol	Derbi	20	+49.412	34	
22	22	(Spain) Pablo Nieto	Derbi	20	+49.460	27	
23	28	(Spain) Jordi Carchano	Aprilia	20	+53.125	33	
24	91	(Italy) Lorenzo Baroni	Aprilia	20	+1:02.887	19	
25	45	(Hungary) Imre Tóth	Aprilia	20	+1:05.235	32	
26	16	(Netherlands) Raymond Schouten	Honda	20	+1:05.289	31	
27	44	(Czech Republic) Karel Abraham	Aprilia	20	+1:05.307	36	
28	26	(Switzerland) Vincent Braillard	Aprilia	20	+1:07.881	39	
29	92	(Italy) Luca Verdini	Aprilia	20	+1:38.237	37	
Ret	36	(Finland) Mika Kallio	KTM	19	Accident	1	
Ret	55	(Spain) Héctor Faubel	Aprilia	19	Accident	3	
Ret	33	(Spain) Sergio Gadea	Aprilia	19	Retirement	15	
Ret	63	(France) Mike Di Meglio	Honda	17	Accident	11	
Ret	10	(Italy) Federico Sandi	Honda	14	Accident	38	
Ret	58	(Italy) Marco Simoncelli	Aprilia	11	Accident	5	
Ret	11	(Germany) Sandro Cortese	Honda	10	Accident	26	
Ret	47	(Spain) Ángel Rodríguez	Honda	9	Retirement	12	
Ret	93	(Italy) Nico Vivarelli	Honda	8	Accident	24	
Ret	52	(Czech Republic) Lukáš Pešek	Derbi	7	Accident	10	
DNS	84	(Spain) Julián Miralles	Aprilia		Did not start		
DNS	62	(Italy) Simone Grotzkyj	Aprilia		Did not start		

== Championship standings after the race (MotoGP) ==
Below are the standings for the top five riders and constructors after round five concluded.

Riders' Championship standings

Pos.	Rider	Points
1	(Italy) Valentino Rossi	120
2	(Italy) Marco Melandri	71
3	(Italy) Max Biaggi	67
4	(Spain) Sete Gibernau	53
5	(Brazil) Alex Barros	52

Constructors' Championship standings

Pos.	Constructor	Points
1	(Japan) Yamaha	120
2	(Japan) Honda	101
3	(Japan) Kawasaki	53
4	(Italy) Ducati	46
5	(Japan) Suzuki	23

- Note: Only the top five positions are included for both sets of standings.

Previous race: 2005 French Grand Prix	FIM Grand Prix World Championship; 2005 season	Next race: 2005 Catalan Grand Prix
Previous race: 2004 Italian Grand Prix	Italian motorcycle Grand Prix	Next race: 2006 Italian Grand Prix
