= Sinan Sofuoğlu =

Turkish motorcycle racer (1982-2008)

Sinan Sofuoğlu (1982 – 9 May 2008) was a Turkish motorcycle racer.

== Biography ==
Part of the motorcycle racing Sofuoğlu family, he started racing at 15, and became drag champion in 1998. He continued his victories with championships won in Group B in 1999, and in Group A in the years 2001, 2002 and 2004. He finished the 2003 season in second. Sinan Sofuoğlu also won the Turkish championship in 2005.

Sofuoğlu had a single wild-card ride in the Turkish 250cc round of Moto GP at Istanbul Park in April 2006, where he qualified 26th with a time of 2:05.532 and finished 19th (and last finisher) with an overall time of 40:44.241

Sofuoğlu died on May 9, 2008, at the age of 25-26 in the intensive care unit of Kocaeli University Hospital following a motorcycle accident. He was training for the Turkey Motorcycle Championship at İzmit Körfez Circuit in Körfez, Kocaeli, where he fell-off his motorcycle and suffered a broken neck, trauma at the base of his skull, and bleeding of the lungs.

The son of a motorcycle dealer in Adapazarı, Turkey, Sofuoğlu and his two other brothers Bahattin and Kenan were all motorcycle racers. His elder brother Bahattin, died in 2002 at the age of 24 following a road traffic accident where he was hit by a car whilst crossing the street.

== Career statistics ==
=== By season ===
Season	Class	Motorcycle	Team	Race	Win	Podium	Pole	FLap	Pts	Plcd
2006	250cc	Honda	Wurth Honda BQR	1	0	0	0	0	0	NC
Total				1	0	0	0	0	0	

=== Races by year ===
(key)

Year	Class	Bike	1	2	3	4	5	6	7	8	9	10	11	12	13	14	15	16	Pos.	Pts
2006	250cc	Honda	SPA; DNQ	QAT	TUR; 19	CHN	FRA	ITA	CAT	NED	GBR	GER	CZE	MAL	AUS	JPN	POR	VAL	NC	0

== See also ==
- Sofuoğlu family
