= 2006 Spanish motorcycle Grand Prix =

(Spain) 2006 Spanish Grand Prix
Race details
- Race 1 of 17 races in the 2006 Grand Prix motorcycle racing season
- Date: 26 March 2006
- Official name: Gran Premio betandwin.com de España
- Location: Circuito de Jerez
- Course: Permanent racing facility; 4.423 km (2.748 mi)

MotoGP
Pole position
- Rider: (Italy) Loris Capirossi
- Time: 1:39.064
Fastest lap
- Rider: (Italy) Loris Capirossi
- Time: 1:41.248
Podium
- First: (Italy) Loris Capirossi
- Second: (Spain) Dani Pedrosa
- Third: (United States) Nicky Hayden

250cc
Pole position
- Rider: (Spain) Jorge Lorenzo
- Time: 1:43.270
Fastest lap
- Rider: (Spain) Héctor Barberá
- Time: 1:45.037
Podium
- First: (Spain) Jorge Lorenzo
- Second: (San Marino) Alex de Angelis
- Third: (Italy) Andrea Dovizioso

125cc
Pole position
- Rider: (Italy) Mattia Pasini
- Time: 1:46.937
Fastest lap
- Rider: (Czech Republic) Lukáš Pešek
- Time: 1:47.404
Podium
- First: (Spain) Álvaro Bautista
- Second: (Czech Republic) Lukáš Pešek
- Third: (Italy) Mattia Pasini

The 2006 Spanish motorcycle Grand Prix was the first race of the 2006 Motorcycle Grand Prix season. It took place on the weekend of 24–26 March 2006 at the Jerez circuit.

== MotoGP classification ==
Pos.	No.	Rider	Team	Manufacturer	Laps	Time/Retired	Grid	Points
1	65	(Italy) Loris Capirossi	Ducati Marlboro Team	Ducati	27	45:57.733	1	25
2	26	(Spain) Dani Pedrosa	Repsol Honda Team	Honda	27	+4.375	5	20
3	69	(United States) Nicky Hayden	Repsol Honda Team	Honda	27	+9.996	4	16
4	24	(Spain) Toni Elías	Fortuna Honda	Honda	27	+10.135	6	13
5	33	(Italy) Marco Melandri	Fortuna Honda	Honda	27	+19.547	7	11
6	27	(Australia) Casey Stoner	Honda LCR	Honda	27	+21.237	15	10
7	56	(Japan) Shinya Nakano	Kawasaki Racing Team	Kawasaki	27	+21.372	3	9
8	10	(United States) Kenny Roberts Jr.	Team Roberts	KR211V	27	+32.414	13	8
9	21	(United States) John Hopkins	Rizla Suzuki MotoGP	Suzuki	27	+32.659	12	7
10	6	(Japan) Makoto Tamada	Konica Minolta Honda	Honda	27	+35.983	16	6
11	5	(United States) Colin Edwards	Camel Yamaha Team	Yamaha	27	+37.930	10	5
12	71	(Australia) Chris Vermeulen	Rizla Suzuki MotoGP	Suzuki	27	+39.514	11	4
13	7	(Spain) Carlos Checa	Tech 3 Yamaha	Yamaha	27	+42.829	14	3
14	46	(Italy) Valentino Rossi	Camel Yamaha Team	Yamaha	27	+1:05.766	9	2
15	66	(Germany) Alex Hofmann	Pramac d'Antin MotoGP	Ducati	27	+1:23.300	19	1
16	77	(United Kingdom) James Ellison	Tech 3 Yamaha	Yamaha	26	+1 lap	18	
Ret	30	(Spain) José Luis Cardoso	Pramac d'Antin MotoGP	Ducati	13	Retirement	17	
Ret	17	(France) Randy de Puniet	Kawasaki Racing Team	Kawasaki	6	Retirement	8	
Ret	15	(Spain) Sete Gibernau	Ducati Marlboro Team	Ducati	2	Retirement	2	

== 250 cc classification ==
Pos.	No.	Rider	Manufacturer	Laps	Time/Retired	Grid	Points
1	48	(Spain) Jorge Lorenzo	Aprilia	26	45:57.390	1	25
2	7	(San Marino) Alex de Angelis	Aprilia	26	+4.919	5	20
3	34	(Italy) Andrea Dovizioso	Honda	26	+8.865	11	16
4	55	(Japan) Yuki Takahashi	Honda	26	+8.922	2	13
5	80	(Spain) Héctor Barberá	Aprilia	26	+9.515	3	11
6	4	(Japan) Hiroshi Aoyama	KTM	26	+23.622	7	10
7	15	(Italy) Roberto Locatelli	Aprilia	26	+34.520	10	9
8	36	(Colombia) Martín Cárdenas	Honda	26	+50.898	17	8
9	50	(France) Sylvain Guintoli	Aprilia	26	+56.314	19	7
10	21	(France) Arnaud Vincent	Honda	26	+1:04.082	20	6
11	54	(San Marino) Manuel Poggiali	KTM	26	+1:09.312	18	5
12	23	(Spain) Arturo Tizón	Honda	26	+1:27.801	14	4
13	57	(United Kingdom) Chaz Davies	Aprilia	26	+1:30.466	16	3
14	31	(Spain) Álvaro Molina	Aprilia	26	+1:34.877	24	2
15	28	(Germany) Dirk Heidolf	Aprilia	26	+1:39.114	12	1
16	41	(Italy) Michele Danese	Aprilia	25	+1 lap	25	
17	66	(Netherlands) Hans Smees	Aprilia	25	+1 lap	28	
18	24	(Spain) Jordi Carchano	Honda	20	+6 laps	23	
Ret	14	(Australia) Anthony West	Aprilia	22	Retirement	6	
Ret	96	(Czech Republic) Jakub Smrž	Aprilia	20	Accident	13	
Ret	58	(Italy) Marco Simoncelli	Gilera	18	Accident	8	
Ret	85	(Italy) Alessio Palumbo	Aprilia	17	Accident	27	
Ret	19	(Argentina) Sebastián Porto	Honda	7	Retirement	22	
Ret	25	(Italy) Alex Baldolini	Aprilia	4	Accident	9	
Ret	16	(France) Jules Cluzel	Aprilia	2	Accident	21	
Ret	73	(Japan) Shuhei Aoyama	Honda	1	Accident	4	
Ret	22	(Italy) Luca Morelli	Aprilia	1	Retirement	26	
DNS	6	(Spain) Alex Debón	Aprilia	0	Did not start	15	
DNS	44	(Japan) Taro Sekiguchi	Aprilia		Did not start		
DNQ	40	(Turkey) Sinan Sofuoğlu	Honda		Did not qualify		

== 125 cc classification ==
Pos.	No.	Rider	Manufacturer	Laps	Time/Retired	Grid	Points
1	19	(Spain) Álvaro Bautista	Aprilia	23	41:42.761	2	25
2	52	(Czech Republic) Lukáš Pešek	Derbi	23	+3.072	3	20
3	75	(Italy) Mattia Pasini	Aprilia	23	+6.491	1	16
4	36	(Finland) Mika Kallio	KTM	23	+6.693	6	13
5	60	(Spain) Julián Simón	KTM	23	+6.877	4	11
6	55	(Spain) Héctor Faubel	Aprilia	23	+7.137	5	10
7	33	(Spain) Sergio Gadea	Aprilia	23	+7.291	8	9
8	14	(Hungary) Gábor Talmácsi	Honda	23	+19.931	7	8
9	6	(Spain) Joan Olivé	Aprilia	23	+22.886	10	7
10	22	(Spain) Pablo Nieto	Aprilia	23	+27.176	9	6
11	24	(Italy) Simone Corsi	Gilera	23	+28.951	13	5
12	71	(Japan) Tomoyoshi Koyama	Malaguti	23	+37.653	15	4
13	8	(Italy) Lorenzo Zanetti	Aprilia	23	+42.814	19	3
14	12	(Italy) Federico Sandi	Aprilia	23	+42.909	24	2
15	29	(Italy) Andrea Iannone	Aprilia	23	+42.998	16	1
16	11	(Germany) Sandro Cortese	Honda	23	+46.381	21	
17	38	(United Kingdom) Bradley Smith	Honda	23	+50.685	25	
18	43	(Spain) Manuel Hernández	Honda	23	+51.169	31	
19	18	(Spain) Nicolás Terol	Derbi	23	+51.260	23	
20	9	(Austria) Michael Ranseder	KTM	23	+51.803	18	
21	63	(France) Mike Di Meglio	Honda	23	+52.726	11	
22	23	(Italy) Lorenzo Baroni	Honda	23	+55.698	22	
23	44	(Czech Republic) Karel Abraham	Aprilia	23	+1:01.202	32	
24	79	(Spain) Enrique Jerez	Aprilia	23	+1:03.282	36	
25	26	(Switzerland) Vincent Braillard	Aprilia	23	+1:12.858	29	
26	45	(Hungary) Imre Tóth	Aprilia	23	+1:17.040	28	
27	78	(Netherlands) Hugo van den Berg	Aprilia	23	+1:24.686	30	
28	21	(Spain) Mateo Túnez	Aprilia	23	+1:28.944	27	
29	16	(Italy) Michele Conti	Honda	23	+1:31.226	33	
30	80	(Spain) Esteve Rabat	Honda	23	+1:35.989	34	
31	53	(Italy) Simone Grotzkyj	Aprilia	23	+1:44.938	37	
32	77	(Spain) Daniel Sáez	Aprilia	23	+1:49.656	35	
33	37	(Netherlands) Joey Litjens	Honda	22	+1 lap	38	
34	20	(Italy) Roberto Tamburini	Aprilia	22	+1 lap	40	
Ret	35	(Italy) Raffaele De Rosa	Aprilia	20	Retirement	12	
Ret	10	(Spain) Ángel Rodríguez	Aprilia	19	Accident	14	
Ret	1	(Switzerland) Thomas Lüthi	Honda	12	Accident	17	
Ret	41	(Spain) Aleix Espargaró	Honda	10	Retirement	20	
Ret	32	(Italy) Fabrizio Lai	Honda	8	Retirement	26	
Ret	76	(Spain) Iván Maestro	Honda	6	Retirement	39	
DNS	7	(France) Alexis Masbou	Malaguti		Did not start		
DNQ	17	(Germany) Stefan Bradl	KTM		Did not qualify		

== Championship standings after the race (MotoGP) ==
Below are the standings for the top five riders and constructors after round one has concluded.

Riders' Championship standings

Pos.	Rider	Points
1	(Italy) Loris Capirossi	25
2	(Spain) Dani Pedrosa	20
3	(United States) Nicky Hayden	16
4	(Spain) Toni Elías	13
5	(Italy) Marco Melandri	11

Constructors' Championship standings

Pos.	Constructor	Points
1	(Italy) Ducati	25
2	(Japan) Honda	20
3	(Japan) Kawasaki	9
4	(United States) KR211V	8
5	(Japan) Suzuki	7

- Note: Only the top five positions are included for both sets of standings.

Previous race: 2005 Valencian Grand Prix	FIM Grand Prix World Championship; 2006 season	Next race: 2006 Qatar Grand Prix
Previous race: 2005 Spanish Grand Prix	Spanish motorcycle Grand Prix	Next race: 2007 Spanish Grand Prix
