= 2006 Turkish motorcycle Grand Prix =

(Turkey) 2006 Turkish Grand Prix
Race details
- Race 3 of 17 races in the 2006 Grand Prix motorcycle racing season
- Date: 30 April 2006
- Official name: Grand Prix of Turkey
- Location: Istanbul Park
- Course: Permanent racing facility; 5.338 km (3.317 mi)

MotoGP
Pole position
- Rider: (Australia) Chris Vermeulen
- Time: 2:04.617
Fastest lap
- Rider: (Spain) Toni Elías
- Time: 1:52.877
Podium
- First: (Italy) Marco Melandri
- Second: (Australia) Casey Stoner
- Third: (United States) Nicky Hayden

250cc
Pole position
- Rider: (Spain) Jorge Lorenzo
- Time: 1:57.841
Fastest lap
- Rider: (San Marino) Alex de Angelis
- Time: 1:58.469
Podium
- First: (Japan) Hiroshi Aoyama
- Second: (Spain) Héctor Barberá
- Third: (Italy) Andrea Dovizioso

125cc
Pole position
- Rider: (Spain) Álvaro Bautista
- Time: 2:04.035
Fastest lap
- Rider: (Spain) Joan Olivé
- Time: 2:03.825
Podium
- First: (Spain) Héctor Faubel
- Second: (Spain) Álvaro Bautista
- Third: (Spain) Sergio Gadea

The 2006 Turkish motorcycle Grand Prix was the third race of the 2006 Motorcycle Grand Prix season. It took place on the weekend of 28–30 April 2006, at the Istanbul Park circuit. The 250cc race saw a number of riders eliminated at the first corner.

== MotoGP race report ==
This race was most notable for its thrilling ending, where Italian satellite Gresini Honda rider Marco Melandri overtook the Australian rookie Casey Stoner at the last corner, denying him his first ever win.

After two rounds, Loris Capirossi led the championship at this point, followed by the Repsol Honda riders Nicky Hayden with 36 and rookie Dani Pedrosa with 30 points. Valentino Rossi - last year's champion - only sat in fourth with a mere 27 points.

Chris Vermeulen took the pole position on Saturday - his first ever - followed by Nicky Hayden in second place and Sete Gibernau in third. Rossi only managed to qualify in a lowly eleventh position, and needed a strong result to stay in the title fight.

As the lights went out, Vermeulen kept his lead as the pack all took off with no problems or incidents. After about half a lap, Vermeulen still led, with Hayden losing two places and dropping to fourth. Gibernau moved up one place (third to second) and John Hopkins two (fifth to third), as did Casey Stoner (seventh to fifth). Melandri meanwhile recovered a whopping eight positions, with Valentino Rossi only making up one place (eleventh to tenth). During the opening lap, Gibernau overtook Vermeulen - making good use of the speed of the Ducati - and moved past to open up a small gap. However, at Turn 12, Vermeulen retook the lead from Gibernau, using the better cornering speed of his Suzuki to his advantage, to lead the race again going into lap two. Rossi also overtook the Kawasaki of Randy de Puniet for the ninth position.

By lap two, Gibernau overtook Vermeulen on the start/finish straight, with the other Suzuki of Hopkins following suit, relegating Vermeulen to third. Behind them, Stoner made quick work of Nicky Hayden and took fourth from him. Rossi meanwhile ran wide at Turn 7, making him drop back all the way to fourteenth after he made up a few places. At Turn 12, Hayden tried to overtake Stoner but ran wide, allowing Marco Melandri to overtake him in return and Stoner to swoop past both of them to reclaim fourth.

Lap three and Gibernau started to form a small gap to Hopkins, with Vermeulen still in third. Rossi overtook Makoto Tamada for thirteenth around halfway the third lap.

On lap four, Stoner shadowed Vermeulen's moves and overtook him at Turn 7 for third place. Vemeulen tried to fight back in acceleration, but by Turn 8 he was relegated to fourth, with Melandri ramping up the pressure as well after Melandri also took fifth from Hayden. Gibernau and Hopkins meanwhile opened up a significant gap to Stoner. Rossi meanwhile overtook Shinya Nakano for twelfth on the straight before Turn 9. Before Turn 12, Melandri overtook Vermeulen - who started to have tyre problems -, with Hayden following suit at Turn 14.

By lap five, the Bridgestone shod Ducati of Gibernau and Suzuki of Hopkins had a one-second lead over Stoner, Melandri, Hayden and Vermeulen, with Stoner's Michelin shod LCR Honda slowly catching up. Rossi was still twelfth. At Turn 12, Hayden overtook Melandri for fourth. Rossi also overtook de Puniet for the eleventh spot.

On lap six, Pedrosa overtook the Yamaha of Colin Edwards for eighth on the start/finish straight. José Luis Cardoso rode into the pits to retire his bike during this lap, choosing not to finish lap five. Rossi crossed the line in tenth after he overtook Toni Elías.

Lap seven and the top runners consist out of Gibernau, Hopkins, Stoner, Hayden and Melandri, with a +1.1 second gap back to Vermeulen in sixth. Pedrosa also overtook Capirossi going into Turn 1 for seventh place. Melandri dove under Hayden at Turn 9 to snatch fourth, with Hayden taking the place back at Turn 14. Rossi is still stuck in tenth place.

Right before lap eight began, Stoner managed to get a better exit speed at Turn 14, allowing him to overtake Hopkins at the start/finish straight. Pedrosa also took sixth from Vermeulen right after them at around the same point. Hayden meanwhile tried to overtake Hopkins going into Turn 3 for third, Hopkins fighting back and forcing Hayden to go the long way around at Turn 4. Hayden held on however, using the better acceleration and traction of his Repsol Honda to eventually pull off the move going into Turn 5. Melandri used this to also force his way past at Turn 7, with Hopkins running slightly wide on exit and Pedrosa sneaking past and grabbing fifth place. Hopkins lost three positions (third to sixth) in just four corners. Both Hayden and Pedrosa use the superior top speed of their Repsol Honda's to try and overtake Stoner and Melandri for second and fourth, but run wide exiting Turn 12, allowing Stoner and Melandri to keep their positions going into Turn 13. However, Stoner himself went a bit too wide and Hayden managed to snatch second from Stoner going into Turn 14.

On lap eight, Gibernau still led, albeit with an ever slimmer margin (+0.7 seconds). Rossi meanwhile still did not manage to move up, as he has a +2,9 second gap to his teammate Edwards.

Lap nine and Stoner took second at Turn 7, with Hayden taking the place back at Turn 8. Stoner himself then got overtaken by Melandri for third place at Turn 12.

By lap ten, Stoner lost yet another position, this time to the other Repsol Honda of Dani Pedrosa, who overtook him on the start/finish straight for fourth. Melandri overtook Hayden for second at Turn 9, with Pedrosa doing likewise at the straight before the entrance to Turn 12 for the third spot.

On lap eleven, Melandri overtook the struggling Gibernau going into Turn 1. Rossi moved and moved up to ninth after Hopkins fell back to eleventh, and closed the gap to Edwards. Pedrosa also swooped past on the inside at Turn 3 to take second from him, with Hayden trying the same at Turn 4 but failing. Hayden however succeeded when he took a shorter entry going into Turn 8, overtaking Gibernau for third. Going into Turn 9, Stoner then also took Gibernau's fourth place, relegating him to fifth in just a few corners. Pedrosa tries to overtake Melandri for the lead going down into Turn 12, but overshoots and loses the place to Melandri, who retakes the lead going into Turn 13.

Lap twelve - just over the halfway point - and the top six is as follows: Melandri, Pedrosa, Hayden, Stoner, Gibernau and Vermeulen, with a +1 second gap back to Capirossi. Rossi meanwhile has managed to overtake Edwards on the start/finish straight for eighth place, with Elías doing likewise for ninth. However, he still had a +2,9 second gap to seventh place Capirossi to make up by then. Hopkins meanwhile went into the pits to change his rear tyre, dropping him back all the way down to last place. Vermeulen overtakes Gibernau going into Turn 9, relegating him to sixth. Unlike last lap, Pedrosa manages to overtake Melandri going into Turn 12.

On lap thirteen, Rossi cut the gap to Capirossi to +1.8 seconds. Hayden overtook Melandri for second going into Turn 12, but goes just a bit too wide. As Melandri tries the cutback, he bumps into Hayden, allowing him to keep the position going into Turn 13 and 14.

Lap fourteen and it is Repsol Honda 1–2, followed by Melandri and Stoner. Pedrosa starts to pull a gap to his teammate Hayden and James Ellison entered the pits to change his Dunlop tyres. Rossi caught Gibernau - who in turn already was overtaken by teammate Capirossi - and overtook him for seventh place at Turn 9, with Elías following suit before the start/finish straight. Alex Hofmann has also retired.

On lap fifteen, Rossi managed to overtake Capirossi for sixth position at Turn 3. No overtakes happened at the main four, which are Pedrosa, Hayden, Melandri and Stoner.

Going into lap sixteen and both Pedrosa and Hayden start to create small gaps to each other and Melandri. Rossi overtook Vermeulen at Turn 9 and is up until fifth place.

Lap seventeen and both Hayden and Melandri have closed the small gaps. While Rossi is up into fifth, he still has a +6,7 gap to fourth place Stoner, making a podium finish highly unlikely for him. Melandri meanwhile made a surprise move on Hayden at Turn 7, forcing him to go a bit wide and snatching second place from him. Stoner made his move in turn at Turn 9, forcing Hayden to go wide as a result. Melandri then overtakes Pedrosa with more speed at the straight before Turn 12, taking over the lead at the front.

Going into lap eighteen and Stoner makes good use of a small mistake of Pedrosa, who kept his front wheel in the air and lost some speed as a result, overtaking him for second on the start/finish straight. Stoner takes over the lead from Melandri by overtaking him at Turn 12.

On lap nineteen, no overtakes happened at the front. Hayden went wide going into Turn 12, making him lose touch with the top three (Stoner, Melandri and Pedrosa). When exiting Turn 14 however, Melandri went slower than usual - possibly because of a missed gear, allowing Pedrosa to snatch second place from him at the beginning of the start/finish straight.

Lap twenty and Hayden is dropping back significantly, possibly due to tyre problems. Melandri overtakes Pedrosa for second place before Turn 12.

The penultimate lap - lap twenty-one - has begun and Stoner is still leading, followed by Melandri and Pedrosa. Hayden is +1.4 seconds behind in fourth and Rossi +4.8 seconds back in fifth. Pedrosa tries to overtake Melandri for second again at Turn 12, but he blocks Pedrosa off and forces him to try via the outside as they go into Turn 12. He runs wide as a result when he enters Turn 13 and by Turn 14, he has lost ground to the top two.

On lap twenty-two - the final lap -, Pedrosa crashes out of third position when his front tyre let go, going into Turn 1. This gifts Hayden third, Rossi fourth and Elías fifth. Melandri was all over the back of Stoner but he did not make a mistake, making his first ever win seem ever more likely. However, as Melandri closed up on the straight before Turn 12, he made his move going into the turn. Stoner tried to hold out so he could retake the lead going into Turn 13, but Melandri outsmarted him and managed to get ahead. With Stoner not able to make a move at Turn 14, Melandri crossed the line +0.200 seconds ahead of Stoner to win the race - a back-to-back victory for him. +5.2 seconds behind them is Hayden, who crossed the line in third, Rossi - who had almost caught Hayden - in fourth and Elías in fifth. Pedrosa crossed the line in a lowly fourteenth place, being able to get back up on his bike after the fall.

During the parade lap back to the pits, Melandri and Stoner congratulated each other and Rossi and Stoner shook hands on the bike. Melandri did a wheelie whilst riding back to parc fermé.

At parc fermé, Hayden talks to his team whilst Melandri celebrates with much joy instead. Stoner is already interviewing the press by then. Stoner and Melandri also shake hands and hug each other.

Before the podium celebrations, the three rides shake each other's hands. The riders come on, the important figures shake their hands, the trophies are being handed to each driver, the Italian nation anthem starts playing and then the riders spray the champagne.

Due to this result, Nicky Hayden takes over the world championship lead from Loris Capirossi by just one point - 52 to 51 -, with Marco Melandri in third place with 45 points. Casey Stoner moves up to fourth with 41 and Valentino Rossi drops one place with 40 points.

== MotoGP classification ==
Pos.	No.	Rider	Team	Manufacturer	Laps	Time/Retired	Grid	Points
1	33	(Italy) Marco Melandri	Fortuna Honda	Honda	22	41:54.065	14	25
2	27	(Australia) Casey Stoner	Honda LCR	Honda	22	+0.200	7	20
3	69	(United States) Nicky Hayden	Repsol Honda Team	Honda	22	+5.458	2	16
4	46	(Italy) Valentino Rossi	Camel Yamaha Team	Yamaha	22	+6.209	11	13
5	24	(Spain) Toni Elías	Fortuna Honda	Honda	22	+6.587	12	11
6	65	(Italy) Loris Capirossi	Ducati Marlboro Team	Ducati	22	+16.682	4	10
7	71	(Australia) Chris Vermeulen	Rizla Suzuki MotoGP	Suzuki	22	+16.777	1	9
8	56	(Japan) Shinya Nakano	Kawasaki Racing Team	Kawasaki	22	+21.537	8	8
9	5	(United States) Colin Edwards	Camel Yamaha Team	Yamaha	22	+22.847	9	7
10	6	(Japan) Makoto Tamada	Konica Minolta Honda	Honda	22	+30.483	13	6
11	15	(Spain) Sete Gibernau	Ducati Marlboro Team	Ducati	22	+30.543	3	5
12	17	(France) Randy de Puniet	Kawasaki Racing Team	Kawasaki	22	+34.284	6	4
13	10	(United States) Kenny Roberts Jr.	Team Roberts	KR211V	22	+45.112	10	3
14	26	(Spain) Dani Pedrosa	Repsol Honda Team	Honda	22	+53.525	16	2
15	7	(Spain) Carlos Checa	Tech 3 Yamaha	Yamaha	22	+59.855	15	1
16	66	(Germany) Alex Hofmann	Pramac d'Antin MotoGP	Ducati	22	+1:01.241	17	
17	21	(United States) John Hopkins	Rizla Suzuki MotoGP	Suzuki	22	+1:38.628	5	
18	77	(United Kingdom) James Ellison	Tech 3 Yamaha	Yamaha	21	+1 lap	19	
NC	30	(Spain) José Luis Cardoso	Pramac d'Antin MotoGP	Ducati	15	+7 laps	18	

== 250 cc classification ==
Pos.	No.	Rider	Manufacturer	Laps	Time/Retired	Grid	Points
1	4	(Japan) Hiroshi Aoyama	KTM	20	40:02.376	6	25
2	80	(Spain) Héctor Barberá	Aprilia	20	+0.401	5	20
3	34	(Italy) Andrea Dovizioso	Honda	20	+0.467	3	16
4	15	(Italy) Roberto Locatelli	Aprilia	20	+0.641	13	13
5	55	(Japan) Yuki Takahashi	Honda	20	+2.555	4	11
6	50	(France) Sylvain Guintoli	Aprilia	20	+10.554	8	10
7	96	(Czech Republic) Jakub Smrž	Aprilia	20	+12.534	10	9
8	25	(Italy) Alex Baldolini	Aprilia	20	+16.887	16	8
9	14	(Australia) Anthony West	Aprilia	20	+17.348	12	7
10	19	(Argentina) Sebastián Porto	Honda	20	+20.910	9	6
11	58	(Italy) Marco Simoncelli	Gilera	20	+28.425	7	5
12	7	(San Marino) Alex de Angelis	Aprilia	20	+35.956	2	4
13	36	(Colombia) Martín Cárdenas	Honda	20	+48.291	22	3
14	28	(Germany) Dirk Heidolf	Aprilia	20	+1:00.604	15	2
15	54	(San Marino) Manuel Poggiali	KTM	20	+1:03.888	18	1
16	16	(France) Jules Cluzel	Aprilia	20	+1:09.340	19	
17	24	(Spain) Jordi Carchano	Honda	20	+1:38.360	25	
18	22	(Italy) Luca Morelli	Aprilia	20	+1:59.179	23	
19	40	(Turkey) Sinan Sofuoğlu	Honda	19	+1 lap	26	
Ret	21	(France) Arnaud Vincent	Honda	8	Accident	11	
Ret	57	(United Kingdom) Chaz Davies	Aprilia	8	Retirement	20	
Ret	23	(Spain) Arturo Tizón	Honda	7	Retirement	21	
Ret	73	(Japan) Shuhei Aoyama	Honda	1	Retirement	14	
Ret	41	(Italy) Michele Danese	Aprilia	0	Accident	24	
Ret	48	(Spain) Jorge Lorenzo	Aprilia	0	Accident	1	
Ret	8	(Italy) Andrea Ballerini	Aprilia	0	Accident	17	
Ret	85	(Italy) Alessio Palumbo	Aprilia	0	Accident	27	

== 125 cc classification ==
Pos.	No.	Rider	Manufacturer	Laps	Time/Retired	Grid	Points
1	55	(Spain) Héctor Faubel	Aprilia	19	39:30.095	4	25
2	19	(Spain) Álvaro Bautista	Aprilia	19	+0.243	1	20
3	33	(Spain) Sergio Gadea	Aprilia	19	+7.240	16	16
4	24	(Italy) Simone Corsi	Gilera	19	+8.340	3	13
5	6	(Spain) Joan Olivé	Aprilia	19	+9.127	9	11
6	14	(Hungary) Gábor Talmácsi	Honda	19	+10.749	6	10
7	52	(Czech Republic) Lukáš Pešek	Derbi	19	+18.258	10	9
8	8	(Italy) Lorenzo Zanetti	Aprilia	19	+22.800	12	8
9	71	(Japan) Tomoyoshi Koyama	Malaguti	19	+23.224	20	7
10	10	(Spain) Ángel Rodríguez	Aprilia	19	+23.240	14	6
11	60	(Spain) Julián Simón	KTM	19	+23.521	7	5
12	1	(Switzerland) Thomas Lüthi	Honda	19	+23.639	11	4
13	32	(Italy) Fabrizio Lai	Honda	19	+23.656	13	3
14	22	(Spain) Pablo Nieto	Aprilia	19	+23.716	8	2
15	29	(Italy) Andrea Iannone	Aprilia	19	+36.240	18	1
16	11	(Germany) Sandro Cortese	Honda	19	+36.311	22	
17	75	(Italy) Mattia Pasini	Aprilia	19	+42.922	2	
18	43	(Spain) Manuel Hernández	Aprilia	19	+43.248	24	
19	17	(Germany) Stefan Bradl	KTM	19	+55.975	29	
20	7	(France) Alexis Masbou	Malaguti	19	+56.027	25	
21	41	(Spain) Aleix Espargaró	Honda	19	+56.352	30	
22	44	(Czech Republic) Karel Abraham	Aprilia	19	+56.753	32	
23	16	(Italy) Michele Conti	Honda	19	+57.435	33	
24	35	(Italy) Raffaele De Rosa	Aprilia	19	+59.703	19	
25	21	(Spain) Mateo Túnez	Aprilia	19	+59.842	34	
26	9	(Austria) Michael Ranseder	KTM	19	+1:00.567	31	
27	18	(Spain) Nicolás Terol	Derbi	19	+1:00.793	21	
28	23	(Italy) Lorenzo Baroni	Honda	19	+1:09.219	27	
29	45	(Hungary) Imre Tóth	Aprilia	19	+1:20.747	23	
30	53	(Italy) Simone Grotzkyj	Aprilia	19	+1:22.635	35	
31	20	(Italy) Roberto Tamburini	Aprilia	19	+1:28.342	39	
32	26	(Switzerland) Vincent Braillard	Aprilia	19	+1:29.066	36	
33	13	(Italy) Dino Lombardi	Aprilia	19	+1:33.910	38	
34	37	(Netherlands) Joey Litjens	Honda	19	+1:34.580	37	
35	12	(Italy) Federico Sandi	Aprilia	19	+1:42.683	17	
Ret	36	(Finland) Mika Kallio	KTM	16	Retirement	5	
Ret	38	(United Kingdom) Bradley Smith	Honda	12	Accident	26	
Ret	63	(France) Mike Di Meglio	Honda	10	Accident	15	
Ret	15	(Italy) Michele Pirro	Aprilia	3	Retirement	28	
DNQ	81	(Romania) Robert Mureșan	Aprilia		Did not qualify		

== Championship standings after the race (MotoGP) ==
Below are the standings for the top five riders and constructors after round three has concluded.

Riders' Championship standings

Pos.	Rider	Points
1	(United States) Nicky Hayden	52
2	(Italy) Loris Capirossi	51
3	(Italy) Marco Melandri	45
4	(Australia) Casey Stoner	41
5	(Italy) Valentino Rossi	40

Constructors' Championship standings

Pos.	Constructor	Points
1	(Japan) Honda	65
2	(Italy) Ducati	51
3	(Japan) Yamaha	43
4	(Japan) Kawasaki	22
5	(United States) KR211V	17

- Note: Only the top five positions are included for both sets of standings.

Previous race: 2006 Qatar Grand Prix	FIM Grand Prix World Championship; 2006 season	Next race: 2006 Chinese Grand Prix
Previous race: 2005 Turkish Grand Prix	Turkish motorcycle Grand Prix	Next race: 2007 Turkish Grand Prix
