= Vakıf, Akyazı =

Neighborhood in Sakarya Province, Turkey

Vakıf
- Neighbourhood
- Location in Turkey Vakıf (Marmara)
- Coordinates: 40°43′48″N 30°36′6″E
- Country: Turkey
- Province: Sakarya
- District: Akyazı
- Population (2022): 1,058
- Time zone: UTC+3 (TRT)

Vakıf is a neighbourhood of the municipality and district of Akyazı, Sakarya Province, Turkey. Its population is 1,058 (2022). It is 20 km from Adapazarı city center.

== Population ==
Historical population
Year	Pop.	±% p.a.
1997	1,054	—
2007	1,160	+0.96%
2012	1,179	+0.33%
2017	1,145	−0.58%
2022	1,058	−1.57%
Source: 1997 census and TÜIK (2007-2022)
