= Kenan Sofuoğlu =

Turkish motorcycle racer (born 1984)

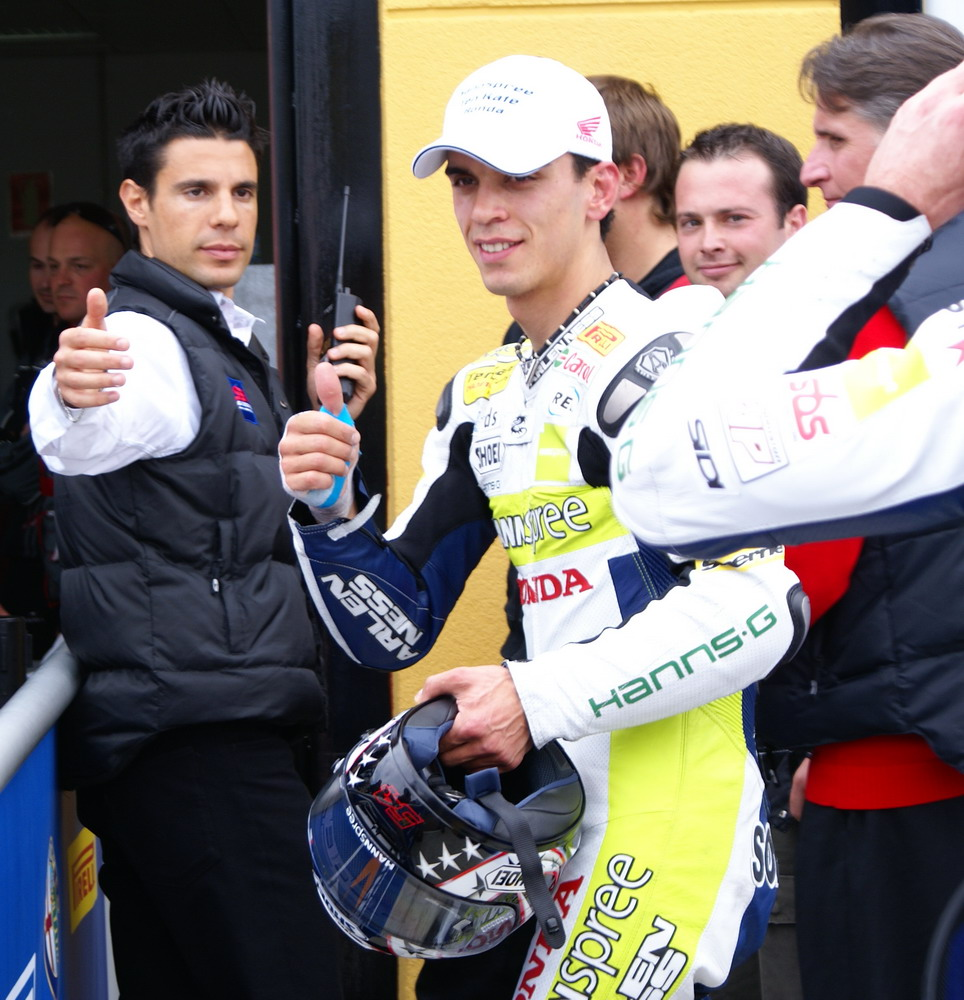
- Sofuoğlu in 2007
- Nationality: Turkish
- Born: 25 August 1984 (age 42); Kuzuluk, Akyazı, Sakarya Province, Turkey
Motorcycle racing career statistics
Moto2 World Championship
Active years	2010–2011
Manufacturers	Honda
Championships	0
2011 championship position	17th (59 pts)
Starts / Wins / Podiums / Poles / F. laps / Points; 16 / 0 / 1 / 0 / 0 / 70
Superbike World Championship
Active years	2008
Manufacturers	Honda
Championships	0
2008 championship position	18th (54 pts)
Starts / Wins / Podiums / Poles / F. laps / Points; 23 / 0 / 0 / 0 / 0 / 54
Supersport World Championship
Active years	2003, 2006–2010, 2012–2018, 2021
Manufacturers	Yamaha, Honda, Kawasaki
Championships	5 (2007, 2010, 2012, 2015, 2016)
2018 championship position	31st (3 pts)
Starts / Wins / Podiums / Poles / F. laps / Points; 126 / 43 / 85 / 34 / 30 / 2036

Kenan Sofuoğlu (born 25 August 1984 in Kuzuluk, Akyazı) is a Turkish parliamentarian and former professional motorcycle racer. He holds a record five Supersport World Championship titles (2007, 2010, 2012, 2015 and 2016). Sofuoğlu also competed at the Superbike World Championship in 2008 and at the Moto2 World Championship in 2010 and 2011.

Sofuoğlu announced his retirement from racing in May 2018, and became an elected politician in June 2018. He made a brief comeback appearance at the Imola, Italy, World Championship event on 13 May where he qualified in third place but entered the pit lane immediately after the sighting lap, choosing to withdraw from the race.

Sofuoğlu suffered injuries in a crash at Phillip Island, Australia, earlier in 2018, exacerbating his previous pelvis fracture from a crash during practice at Magny-Cours, France, on 30 September 2017, which initially appeared to have ended participation in the 2017 season. After a period of only five weeks, he returned to participate in the last meeting at Qatar, finishing the race in third place and totalling enough points to finish second in the championship.

Sofuoğlu also competed in Moto2 for the Technomag-CIP team, having made his debut at the end of 2010 and remained with the team for the 2011 season. He previously won the Supersport World Championship with Ten Kate Honda in 2007 and 2010. He raced in the World Superbike Championship for Ten Kate in 2008, but with limited success.

Racing for Kawasaki in 2012, Sofuoğlu claimed his third Supersport World Championship at the Portuguese Grand Prix, in the penultimate race.

As a five-time champion, Sofuoğlu is the most successful rider to have competed in the Supersport World Championship and holds many records in the class.

== Career ==
=== Supersport & Superbike World Championship ===
After winning Class B of the Turkish Supersport Championship in 2000 and the German Yamaha R6 Cup in 2002, Sofuoğlu moved into the European Superstock Championship, finishing second and third in two seasons. Subsequently, Sofuoğlu entered the Supersport World Championship full-time in 2006 after three races in 2003. Sofuoğlu dominated the 2007 season, winning five of the first eight races, and broke the record for the most wins in one season. These included a two-lap charge from sixth to first at Monza, and a win on his first ever visit to Donington Park, in the wet. He also won at Losail, Spain and Assen, Netherlands. He clinched the championship with three races to go, by finishing second at Brands Hatch, becoming Turkey's first major motorsport world champion.

Sofuoğlu then signed with Ten Kate Honda for three more years. For 2008, he rode a third Ten Kate Honda CBR1000RR in World Superbikes, as part of a junior team. He was not successful, and returned to Supersport with the team for 2009. This time, the team struggled to match Cal Crutchlow's Yamaha and the Parkalgar Honda of Eugene Laverty, leaving Sofuoğlu to fight for third in the standings. He opened 2010 with a succession of podium finishes, leaving him in a three-way championship battle with Laverty and Motocard Kawasaki's Joan Lascorz. He eventually claimed the title, finishing on the podium in every race.

For 2013, as the world champion, Sofuoğlu had the option of riding for the Italian Pedercini Team but he opted to join the Indian Mahi Team owned by Mahendra Singh Dhoni.

=== Moto2 World Championship ===
Towards the end of the 2010 season, Sofuoğlu appeared in Moto2 at the Portuguese Grand Prix, with the Technomag-CIP team, replacing Shoya Tomizawa, who had died in an incident at Misano. Sofuoğlu was fourth fastest in practice, which put him on the front row after qualifying was rained out. The race marked his first ever dry laps on the bike, but he led for the majority of the race before finishing the race in fifth despite having to try to adjust the handlebars of the bike while racing. Sofuoğlu remained with the team in 2011, riding one of the team's Suters. His best finish was second place at Assen.

== Injuries ==
During training for the 2017 Supersport World Championship in early February, Sofuoğlu broke a finger bone. He had to undergo two operations. Just before the first round of the championship in Australia, he performed a two-day test, but was not ready to race because of pain when braking, and decided not to start. He flew back home to undergo another operation, and stated that he would miss the opening two rounds, but would be present again in Spain, the third round of the championship.

On 30 September, Sofuoğlu broke his pelvis in three places after a crash during the Superpole session of a championship race in France. The same day, he was flown to Istanbul, Turkey for medical care by air ambulance. His doctor stated that Sofuğlu could be discharged from the hospital in 5–6 weeks if everything went right. Sofuoğlu confirmed the recovery period as 12 weeks.

After a period of only five weeks, Sofuoğlu returned to participate in the last meeting at Qatar, finishing the race in third place and totalling points for second place the championship.

Sofuoglu announced his retirement from racing on the build-up to the fifth round of the 2018 season at Imola after sustaining another injury at Phillip Island. This is in addition to a crash at Magny-Cours in the previous year, when he suffered a hip injury.

== Politics ==
Sofuoğlu was elected in June 2018 as a Justice and Development Party (AK Party) parliamentarian for the Sakarya Province.

On 4 July 2018, the Turkish parliament's opening day for the 2018–2019 session, Sofuoğlu arrived driving a Lamborghini Aventador, which he parked in a space reserved for an opposition deputy. This drew criticism about the "luxury car" but Sofuoğlu—who also owns two Mercedes SUVs, a Ferrari, and a Fiat 124—responded that the critics have taken aim at him because of his party affiliation and the car was only an excuse. Sofuoğlu has stated he gives his elected deputy's salary to charity.

== Personal life ==
Sofuoğlu is the third child of İrfan Basri Sofuoğlu and his wife Nurhayat. He has one sister and two brothers. His father is a motorcycle repairman with his own garage. Two of Sofuoğlu's brothers, who were also local motorcycle racers, have died in accidents. Sofuoğlu's eldest brother Bahattin, himself a domestic Turkish motorcycling champion, died in a traffic accident in 2002. His next eldest brother Sinan died during a race training incident at the İzmit Körfez Circuit in May 2008.

Sofuoğlu speaks German, French, English and Turkish. Sofuoğlu is a practising Muslim, and observes daytime fasting during Ramadan. His bike number 54 stems from his home town's (Sakarya Province in Turkey) license plate number. He has noted that his riding style uses too much upper-body effort, causing him to tire on the bike.

On 3 September 2014, Sofuoğlu married Julia Looman, after a two-year engagement. After the wedding ceremony in his hometown Sakarya, the couple flew to Barcelona, Spain.

On 14 March 2015, Sofuoğlu became the father of a son named Hamza, who was born in the Netherlands. On 2 May 2015, the infant suffered a cerebral hemorrhage during a family holiday in Alanya. He was transferred to Istanbul, and underwent surgery. Hamza died on 25 July 2015, aged four months, and was buried in the family grave at Akyazı, Sakarya.

Since then, the couple has welcomed four more children into the world. Mahir Sofuoğlu, born 19 April 2016, Zayn Sofuoğlu, born 11 April 2019, Lila Sofuoğlu, born 26 May 2021, and Rayen Sofuoğlu, born in 2023.

== Career statistics ==
2004 - 3rd, Superstock European Championship, Yamaha YZF-R1
2005 - 2nd, FIM Superstock 1000 Cup, Yamaha YZF-R1

=== Supersport World Championship ===
==== Races by year ====
(key) (Races in bold indicate pole position; races in italics indicate fastest lap)

Year	Bike	1	2	3	4	5	6	7	8	9	10	11	12	13	14	Pos	Pts
2003	Yamaha	SPA; 16	AUS	JPN	ITA	GER; Ret	GBR	SMR	GBR	NED	ITA	FRA; Ret				NC	0
2006	Honda	QAT; 3	AUS; Ret	SPA; Ret	ITA; 5	EUR; 20	SMR; 8	CZE; 3	GBR; 3	NED; 1	GER; 1	ITA; 2	FRA; 2			**3rd**	**157**
2007	Honda	QAT; 1	AUS; 2	EUR; 1	**SPA**; 1	**NED**; 1	**ITA**; 1	GBR; Ret	SMR; 3	**CZE**; 1	GBR; 2	GER; 2	ITA; 1	**FRA**; 1		**1st**	**276**
2008	Honda	QAT	AUS	SPA	NED	ITA	GER	SMR	CZE	GBR	EUR	ITA	FRA	**POR**; 1		19th	25
2009	Honda	**AUS**; 1	QAT; 4	SPA; 3	NED; 5	ITA; 9	RSA; 5	USA; 1	SMR; Ret	GBR; 4	CZE; 9	GER; Ret	ITA; 1	FRA; 3	POR; 2	**3rd**	**189**
2010	Honda	AUS; 3	POR; 1	SPA; 2	**NED**; 3	**ITA**; 2	RSA; 2	**USA**; 1	SMR; 3	CZE; 1	GBR; 2	GER; 2	**ITA**; 2	**FRA**; 2		**1st**	**263**
2012	Kawasaki	AUS; 1	ITA; DSQ	NED; 2	ITA; 3	EUR; 2	SMR; 1	SPA; 5	**CZE**; 2	GBR; 5	RUS; 1	GER; 1	POR; 2	FRA; 4		**1st**	**218**
2013	Kawasaki	AUS; 1	**SPA**; Ret	NED; 2	ITA; Ret	GBR; 2	POR; 3	ITA; 1	**RUS**; C	GBR; 1	GER; Ret	**TUR**; 1	**FRA**; 1	SPA; 2		**2nd**	**201**
2014	Kawasaki	**AUS**; Ret	SPA; 1	NED; Ret	ITA; Ret	GBR; 4	MAL; 3	SMR; 4	**POR**; 3	SPA; 13	FRA; Ret	QAT; 8				8th	94
2015	Kawasaki	AUS; 6	**THA**; 2	SPA; 1	NED; 1	ITA; 1	**GBR**; 1	POR; 2	SMR; 11	MAL; 4	**SPA**; 1	FRA; 2	**QAT**; 2			**1st**	**233**
2016	Kawasaki	**AUS**; Ret	THA; 2	**SPA**; 1	NED; 3	ITA; 1	**MAL**; 6	**GBR**; 1	ITA; 1	**GER**; 1	**FRA**; Ret	**SPA**; 1	QAT; 2			**1st**	**216**
2017	Kawasaki	AUS	THA	SPA; Ret	**NED**; 1	ITA; 1	**GBR**; 1	**ITA**; 1	GER; 2	**POR**; 1	FRA; DNS	SPA	QAT; 3			**2nd**	**161**
2018	Kawasaki	AUS; 13	THA	SPA	NED	ITA; Ret	GBR	CZE	ITA	POR	FRA	ARG	QAT			31st	3

Year	Bike	1	2	3	4	5	6	7	8	9	10	11	12	13	14	15	16	17	18	19	20	21	22	23	24	Pos	Pts
2021	Kawasaki	SPA	SPA	POR	POR	ITA	ITA	NED	NED	CZE	CZE	SPA	SPA	FRA	FRA	SPA	SPA	SPA; C	SPA; DNS	POR	POR	ARG	ARG	INA	INA	NC	0

=== Superstock European Championship ===
==== Races by year ====
(key) (Races in bold indicate pole position) (Races in italics indicate fastest lap)

Year	Bike	1	2	3	4	5	6	7	8	9	Pos	Pts
2004	Yamaha	VAL; 6	SMR; 15	MNZ; 7	OSC; 3	SIL; 16	BRA; 3	NED; 3	IMO; 2	MAG; 3	3rd	104

=== FIM Superstock 1000 Cup ===
==== Races by year ====
(key) (Races in bold indicate pole position) (Races in italics indicate fastest lap)

Year	Bike	1	2	3	4	5	6	7	8	9	10	Pos	Pts
2005	Yamaha	VAL; 1	MNZ; 1	SIL; 3	SMR	BRN; 2	BRA; 1	NED; 3	LAU; 6	IMO; Ret	MAG; 2	2nd	157

=== Superbike World Championship ===
==== By season ====
Season	Motorcycle	Team	Number	Race	Win	Podium	Pole	FLap	Pts	Plcd	WCh
2008	Honda CBR1000RR	Hannspree Ten Kate Honda Jr.	54	23	0	0	0	0	54	18th	0
Total				**23**	**0**	**0**	**0**	**0**	**54**		**0**

==== Races by year ====
(key) (Races in bold indicate pole position, races in italics indicate fastest lap)

Year	Bike	1		2		3		4		5		6		7		8		9		10		11		12		13		14		Pos	Pts
Year	Bike	R1	R2	R1	R2	R1	R2	R1	R2	R1	R2	R1	R2	R1	R2	R1	R2	R1	R2	R1	R2	R1	R2	R1	R2	R1	R2	R1	R2	Pos	Pts
2008	Honda	QAT; 12	QAT; 10	AUS; 14	AUS; 11	ESP; 12	ESP; 15	NED; 12	NED; 19	ITA; DNS	ITA; DNS	USA; 12	USA; 14	GER; Ret	GER; 21	SMR; 18	SMR; Ret	CZE; 10	CZE; 10	GBR; 13	GBR; 17	EUR; Ret	EUR; DNS	ITA; Ret	ITA; Ret	FRA; 9	FRA; 19	POR	POR	18th	54

=== Grand Prix motorcycle racing ===
==== By season ====
Season	Class	Motorcycle	Type	Team	Number	Races	Win	Podium	Pole	Pts	Plcd
2010	Moto2	Suter	Suter MMX	TechnoMag-CIP	54	2	0	0	0	11	29th
2011	Moto2	Suter	Suter MMXI	TechnoMag-CIP	54	14	0	1	0	59	17th
Total						**16**	**0**	**1**	**0**	**70**	

==== By class ====
Class	Seasons	1st GP	1st Pod	Race	Win	Podiums	Pole	FLap	Pts	WChmp
Moto2	2010–2011	2010 Portugal	2011 Netherlands	16	0	1	0	0	70	0
Total	2010–2011			**16**	**0**	**1**	**0**	**0**	**70**	**0**

==== Races by year ====
(key) (Races in bold indicate pole position, races in italics indicate fastest lap)

Year	Class	Bike	1	2	3	4	5	6	7	8	9	10	11	12	13	14	15	16	17	Pos	Pts
2010	Moto2	Suter	QAT	SPA	FRA	ITA	GBR	NED	CAT	GER	CZE	INP	RSM	ARA	JPN	MAL	AUS	POR; 5	VAL; Ret	29th	11
2011	Moto2	Suter	QAT; 18	SPA; 16	POR; Ret	FRA; 26	CAT; Ret	GBR; 8	NED; 2	ITA; 10	GER; 11	CZE; 10	INP; DNS	RSM	ARA	JPN; 19	AUS; 6	MAL; 12	VAL; 20	17th	59

== See also ==
- Sofuoğlu family
