= 2005 FIM Superstock 1000 Cup =

2005 FIM Superstock 1000 Cup
Previous:	2004	Next:	2006
Support series: Superbike World Championship; Supersport World Championship; European Superstock 600 Championship

The 2005 FIM Superstock 1000 Cup was the seventh season of the FIM Superstock 1000 championship, the first held under this name. The FIM Superstock 1000 championship followed the same calendar as the Superbike World Championship, missing out the none European rounds of the championship. Starting on 24 April in Circuit Ricardo Tormo and ending on 9 October in Circuit de Nevers Magny-Cours.

Didier Van Keymeulen won the title after beating closest rival Kenan Sofuoğlu.

== Race calendar and results ==
2005 Calendar
Round	Date	Round	Circuit	Pole position	Fastest lap	Race winner	Winning team
1	24 April	Spain	Circuit Ricardo Tormo	(Belgium) Didier Van Keymeulen	(Italy) Massimo Roccoli	(Turkey) Kenan Sofuoğlu	Yamaha Motor Germany
2	8 May	Italy	Autodromo Nazionale Monza	(Italy) Massimo Roccoli	(Italy) Massimo Roccoli	(Turkey) Kenan Sofuoğlu	Yamaha Motor Germany
3	29 May	Europe	Silverstone Circuit	(Italy) Massimo Roccoli	(Italy) Massimo Roccoli	(Italy) Massimo Roccoli	Italia Lorenzini by Leoni
4	26 June	San Marino	Misano Adriatico	(Belgium) Dider Van Keymeulen	(Italy) Vittorio Iannuzzo	(Italy) Riccardo Chiarello	Alstare Suzuki Corona Extra
5	17 July	Czech Republic	Brno Circuit	(Belgium) Didier Van Keymeulen	(Belgium) Didier Van Keymeulen	(Australia) Craig Coxhell	EMS Racing
6	7 August	(United Kingdom) Great Britain	Brands Hatch	(Turkey) Kenan Sofuoğlu	(Turkey) Kenan Sofuoğlu	(Turkey) Kenan Sofuoğlu	Yamaha Motor Germany
7	4 September	Netherlands	TT Circuit Assen	(Turkey) Kenan Sofuoğlu	(Italy) Alessandro Polita	(Italy) Alessandro Polita	Celani - Suzuki Italia
8	11 September	Germany	Lausitzring	(Turkey) Kenan Sofuoğlu	(Turkey) Kenan Sofuoğlu	(Belgium) Didier Van Keymeulen	Yamaha Motor Germany
9	2 October	Italy	Autodromo Enzo e Dino Ferrari	(Turkey) Kenan Sofuoğlu	(Italy) Riccardo Chiarello	(Italy) Riccardo Chiarello	Alstare Suzuki Corona Extra
10	9 October	France	Circuit de Nevers Magny-Cours	(Germany) Stefan Nebel	(Italy) Alessandro Polita	(Belgium) Didier Van Keymeulen	Yamaha Motor Germany

== Entry list ==
Team	Constructor	Motorcycle	No.	Rider	Rounds
MS Akuna Racing	Honda	Honda CBR1000RR	47	(United Kingdom) Richard Cooper	All
James Jackson Racing	Kawasaki	Kawasaki ZX 10R	64	(United Kingdom) Guy Sanders	6
PSG–1 Corse	Kawasaki	Kawasaki ZX 10R	11	(Italy) Denis Sacchetti	All
Vivaldi Racing	Kawasaki	Kawasaki ZX 10R	63	(United Kingdom) Ollie Bridewell	6
EVR Corse Biassono Racing	MV Agusta	MV Agusta F4 1000 R	68	(Italy) Daniele Vaghi	1–5
EVR Corse Biassono Racing	MV Agusta	MV Agusta F4 1000 R	86	(Italy) Ayrton Badovini	All
Gimotorsport UnionBikeDucci	MV Agusta	MV Agusta F4 1000 R	31	(Italy) Vittorio Iannuzzo	All
Gimotorsport UnionBikeDucci	MV Agusta	MV Agusta F4 1000 R	45	(Italy) Gianluca Rapicavoli	9
Gimotorsport UnionBikeDucci	MV Agusta	MV Agusta F4 1000 R	48	(Italy) Fabrizio De Marco	1–4, 6
Gimotorsport UnionBikeDucci	MV Agusta	MV Agusta F4 1000 R	84	(Italy) Mattia Angeloni	5, 7–8, 10
Alstare Suzuki Corona Extra	Suzuki	Suzuki GSX-R1000 K5	5	(Italy) Riccardo Chiarello	All
Association Plein Gaz	Suzuki	Suzuki GSX-R1000 K5	14	(France) Pierrot Vanstaen	1–2, 4–10
Beowulf Motorsport.com	Suzuki	Suzuki GSX-R1000 K5	88	(United Kingdom) Victor Cox	1–6
Beowulf Motorsport.com	Suzuki	Suzuki GSX-R1000 K5	89	(Republic of Ireland) John Laverty	6
Beowulf Motorsport.com	Suzuki	Suzuki GSX-R1000 K5	89	(Republic of Ireland) John Laverty	7–10
Biassono Racing; EVR Corse Biassono Racing	Suzuki	Suzuki GSX-R1000 K5	68	(Italy) Daniele Vaghi	7–10
Boselli Racing	Suzuki	Suzuki GSX-R1000 K5	70	(Italy) Enrico Pasini	8–9
Celani - Suzuki Italia	Suzuki	Suzuki GSX-R1000 K5	53	(Italy) Alessandro Polita	All
Celani - Suzuki Italia	Suzuki	Suzuki GSX-R1000 K5	57	(Italy) Ilario Dionisi	All
Electrolombar	Suzuki	Suzuki GSX-R1000 K5	99	(Spain) Jose Lombardo	1
EMS Racing	Suzuki	Suzuki GSX-R1000 K5	41	(Australia) Craig Coxhell	All
Fucile Racing	Suzuki	Suzuki GSX-R1000 K5	45	(Italy) Gianluca Rapicavoli	4
Herman Verboven Racing	Suzuki	Suzuki GSX-R1000 K5	22	(Belgium) Leroy Verboven	All
HP Racing	Suzuki	Suzuki GSX-R1000 K5	15	(Spain) Enrique Rocamora	All
MD Team Jerman	Suzuki	Suzuki GSX-R1000 K5	24	(Slovenia) Marko Jerman	All
Prista Oil Racing	Suzuki	Suzuki GSX-R1000 K5	73	(Bulgaria) Martin Choy	1–6, 8–10
Racing Dirk Van Mol	Suzuki	Suzuki GSX-R1000 K5	28	(Belgium) Sepp Vermonden	All
Racing Dirk Van Mol	Suzuki	Suzuki GSX-R1000 K5	67	(Netherlands) Allard Kerkhoven	8–10
Racing Dirk Van Mol	Suzuki	Suzuki GSX-R1000 K5	77	(Belgium) Nicolas Saelens	1–7
Suzuki Grands Duo Racing	Suzuki	Suzuki GSX-R1000 K5	74	(Poland) Bartlomiej Wiczynski	10
Suzuki LMS	Suzuki	Suzuki GSX-R1000 K5	46	(France) Guillaume Dietrich	5
Team Suzuki Nederland	Suzuki	Suzuki GSX-R1000 K5	65	(Netherlands) Ron Van Steenbergen	7
Team Tyger	Suzuki	Suzuki GSX-R1000 K5	82	(Switzerland) Yann Gyger	1–9
Team Yohann Motorsport	Suzuki	Suzuki GSX-R1000 K5	72	(France) Cédric Tangre	9–10
44 Racing Team	Yamaha	Yamaha YZF-R1	44	(Italy) Roberto Lunadei	4, 9
44 Racing Team	Yamaha	Yamaha YZF-R1	49	(Italy) Simone Saltarelli	9
Alapont Competition	Yamaha	Yamaha YZF-R1	34	(Spain) Jose Manuel Hurtado	1–8
Autophone Racing	Yamaha	Yamaha YZF-R1	25	(Belgium) Olivier Depoorter	All
Badan Yamaha	Yamaha	Yamaha YZF-R1	40	(Switzerland) Hervé Gantner	All
Bikers Days Acropolis	Yamaha	Yamaha YZF-R1	91	(France) Laurry Fremy	10
Foray Racing Team	Yamaha	Yamaha YZF-R1	90	(France) Freddy Foray	10
IMS Racing	Yamaha	Yamaha YZF-R1	51	(Norway) Jan Roar Ims	All
Italia Lorenzini by Leoni	Yamaha	Yamaha YZF-R1	55	(Italy) Massimo Roccoli	All
Ormeni Racing	Yamaha	Yamaha YZF-R1	9	(Italy) Luca Scassa	All
PL Motoracing	Yamaha	Yamaha YZF-R1	60	(Spain) Julian Mazuecos	1, 3–4, 6–9
PMS Corse; Team PMS Corse	Yamaha	Yamaha YZF-R1	21	(Italy) Giacomo Romanelli	2–10
PMS Corse; Team PMS Corse	Yamaha	Yamaha YZF-R1	32	(Spain) Alex Martinez	All
Rafael Racing	Yamaha	Yamaha YZF-R1	66	(Netherlands) Rafael Sinke	7
SolliRacing	Yamaha	Yamaha YZF-R1	71	(Norway) Petter Solli	All
Team Trasimeno	Yamaha	Yamaha YZF-R1	37	(San Marino) William De Angelis	All
Yamaha Motor Germany	Yamaha	Yamaha YZF-R1	50	(Germany) Stefan Nebel	4
Yamaha Motor Germany	Yamaha	Yamaha YZF-R1	50	(Germany) Stefan Nebel	10
Yamaha Motor Germany	Yamaha	Yamaha YZF-R1	54	(Turkey) Kenan Sofuoğlu	1–3, 5–10
Yamaha Motor Germany	Yamaha	Yamaha YZF-R1	69	(Belgium) Didier Van Keymeulen	All
Zone Rouge	Yamaha	Yamaha YZF-R1	12	(Belgium) Denny Lannoo	All

Key
Regular rider
Wildcard rider
Replacement rider

- All entries used Pirelli tyres.

== Championship' standings ==
=== Riders' standings ===
Pos	Rider	Bike	VAL (Spain)	MNZ (Italy)	SIL (Europe)	MIS (San Marino)	BRN (Czech Republic)	BRA (United Kingdom)	ASS (Netherlands)	LAU (Germany)	IMO (Italy)	MAG (France)	Pts
1	(Belgium) Didier Van Keymeulen	Yamaha	**2**	5	4	**2**	**4**	11	2	1	5	1	163
2	(Turkey) Kenan Sofuoğlu	Yamaha	1	1	3		2	**1**	**3**	**6**	**Ret**	2	157
3	(Australia) Craig Coxhell	Suzuki	5	3	2	6	1	5	11	5	3	Ret	125
4	(Italy) Alessandro Polita	Suzuki	Ret	7	10	5	6	3	1	4	2	5	121
5	(Italy) Massimo Roccoli	Yamaha	3	**2**	**1**	4	3	Ret	4	Ret	9	7	119
6	(Italy) Riccardo Chiarello	Suzuki	Ret	4	Ret	1	7	4	10	3	1	10	113
7	(Italy) Luca Scassa	Yamaha	21	Ret	8	7	15	2	Ret	2	6	6	78
8	(Italy) Ilario Dionisi	Suzuki	7	13	DNS	9	8	8	7	20	4	4	70
9	(San Marino) William De Angelis	Yamaha	4	Ret	5	8	11	Ret	9	10	19	9	57
10	(Spain) Alex Martinez	Yamaha	22	6	7	10	13	6	8	Ret	10	13	55
11	(Spain) Enrique Rocamora	Suzuki	Ret	24	6	Ret	9	9	6	7	Ret	8	51
12	(Italy) Ayrton Badovini	MV Agusta	9	Ret	16	12	12	7	5	8	14	Ret	45
13	(United Kingdom) Richard Cooper	Honda	10	9	Ret	14	10	13	15	9	8	14	42
14	(Italy) Vittorio Iannuzzo	MV Agusta	Ret	11	9	3	14	Ret	16	Ret	DNS	DNS	30
15	(Italy) Denis Sacchetti	Kawasaki	12	8	11	11	WD	19	Ret	17	16	15	23
16	(Spain) Julian Mazuecos	Yamaha	13		DNS	Ret		14	WD	11	7		19
17	(Norway) Petter Solli	Yamaha	15	18	DNS	Ret	5	18	Ret	14	Ret	12	18
18	(Italy) Fabrizio De Marco	MV Agusta	6	12	12	Ret		25					18
19	(Switzerland) Hervé Gantner	Yamaha	8	Ret	13	13	16	Ret	23	13	26	Ret	17
20	(Germany) Stefan Nebel	Yamaha				DNS						**3**	16
21	(Republic of Ireland) John Laverty	Suzuki						12	Ret	Ret	13	11	12
22	(Belgium) Sepp Vermonden	Suzuki	14	10	Ret	Ret	19	20	13	21	17	16	11
23	(United Kingdom) Ollie Bridewell	Kawasaki						10					6
24	(France) Pierrot Vanstaen	Suzuki	11	DNS		18	24	21	22	Ret	20	19	5
25	(Italy) Roberto Lunadei	Yamaha				Ret					11		5
26	(Italy) Giacomo Romanelli	Yamaha		15	22	DNS	22	22	18	Ret	12	WD	5
27	(Slovenia) Marko Jerman	Suzuki	18	14	15	15	17	Ret	19	15	18	18	5
28	(Netherlands) Ron Van Steenbergen	Suzuki							12				4
29	(Italy) Enrico Pasini	Suzuki								12	21		4
30	(United Kingdom) Victor Cox	Suzuki	17	17	14	17	23	16					2
31	(Belgium) Nicolas Saelens	Suzuki	19	16	18	Ret	Ret	17	14				2
32	(United Kingdom) Guy Sanders	Kawasaki						15					1
33	(Italy) Gianluca Rapicavoli	Suzuki				Ret							1
33	(Italy) Gianluca Rapicavoli	MV Agusta									15		1
	(Spain) Jose Manuel Hurtado	Yamaha	16	DNS	17	Ret	26	24	17	19			0
	(Bulgaria) Martin Choy	Suzuki	23	21	19	16	18	23		WD	23	27	0
	(Netherlands) Allard Kerkhoven	Suzuki								16	25	21	0
	(France) Freddy Foray	Yamaha										17	0
	(Norway) Jan Roar Ims	Yamaha	20	WD	WD	19	27	26	20	18	WD	24	0
	(Belgium) Denny Lannoo	Yamaha	27	19	21	Ret	28	27	24	DNS	27	25	0
	(Belgium) Olivier Depoorter	Yamaha	24	20	20	Ret	25	29	Ret	Ret	28	23	0
	(Belgium) Leroy Verboven	Suzuki	25	22	24	20	30	28	25	23	WD	DNS	0
	(Italy) Mattia Angeloni	MV Agusta					20		21	22		22	0
	(France) Cédric Tangre	Suzuki									24	20	0
	(Italy) Daniele Vaghi	MV Agusta	28	DNQ	25	21	Ret						0
	(Italy) Daniele Vaghi	Suzuki							27	DNQ	DNS	WD	0
	(France) Guillaume Dietrich	Suzuki					21						0
	(Switzerland) Yann Gyger	Suzuki	26	23	23	Ret	29	WD	26	24	WD		0
	(Poland) Bartlomiej Wiczynski	Suzuki										26	0
	(Netherlands) Rafael Sinke	Yamaha							Ret				0
	(Italy) Simone Saltarelli	Yamaha									Ret		0
	(France) Laurry Fremy	Yamaha										Ret	0
	(Spain) Jose Lombardo	Suzuki	WD										
Pos	Rider	Bike	VAL (Spain)	MNZ (Italy)	SIL (Europe)	MIS (San Marino)	BRN (Czech Republic)	BRA (United Kingdom)	ASS (Netherlands)	LAU (Germany)	IMO (Italy)	MAG (France)	Pts

Colour	Result
Gold	Winner
Silver	Second place
Bronze	Third place
Green	Points classification
Blue	Non-points classification
Blue	Non-classified finish (NC)
Purple	Retired, not classified (Ret)
Red	Did not qualify (DNQ)
Red	Did not pre-qualify (DNPQ)
Black	Disqualified (DSQ)
White	Did not start (DNS)
White	Withdrew (WD)
White	Race cancelled (C)
Blank	Did not practice (DNP)
Blank	Did not arrive (DNA)
Blank	Excluded (EX)

**Bold** – Pole position
Italics – Fastest lap
Source :
