= Ollie Bridewell =

British motorcycle road racer (1985-2007)

- Bridewell on the grid waiting for a race-start
- Nationality: British
- Born: 10 December 1985; Etchilhampton, Wiltshire
- Died: 20 July 2007 (aged 21); Mallory Park, Leicestershire, England

Oliver Frederick Bridewell, 10 December 1985 – 20 July 2007), from Etchilhampton, Wiltshire, was a British motorcycle road racer.

In 2005, Bridewell competed in the British Superstock Championship, as well as a European series one-off at Brands Hatch.

In 2006 and 2007, Bridewell raced in the British Superbike Championship for Vivaldi Suzuki, alongside his brother Tommy in 2007. His best results were two eighth places.

Bridewell died during practice at Mallory Park on 20 July 2007. Torrential rain had made the circuit slippery, and he lost control entering the John Cooper Esses and crashed, suffering head and neck injuries. As with all UK Motorsport events, an ambulance was at the scene and tended to him, but without success and he was pronounced dead at the circuit.

Air Ambulance Volunteer Doctor Dhushy Kumar reported that "Unfortunately, Mr Bridewell was in cardiac arrest when we arrived". Michael Rutter described him as a "highly talented and a very popular young lad".

Around 1300 people gathered for the funeral at St Mary's Church, Bishops Cannings on 1 August 2007, followed by a private family burial at Etchilhampton Churchyard.

== Career statistics ==
- 2005 - 23rd, FIM Superstock 1000 Cup, Kawasaki ZX-10R

=== FIM Superstock 1000 Cup ===
==== Races by year ====
(key) (Races in bold indicate pole position) (Races in italics indicate fastest lap)

Year	Bike	1	2	3	4	5	6	7	8	9	10	Pos	Pts
2005	Yamaha	VAL	MNZ	SIL	SMR	BRN	BRA; 10	NED	LAU	IMO	MAG	23rd	6

=== British Superbike Championship ===
Year	Class	Bike	1		2		3		4		5		6		7		8		9		10		11		12		13		Pos	Pts
Year	Class	Bike	R1	R2	R1	R2	R1	R2	R1	R2	R1	R2	R1	R2	R1	R2	R1	R2	R1	R2	R1	R2	R1	R2	R1	R2	R1	R2	Pos	Pts
2006	BSB	Suzuki	BHI; 15	BHI; 10	DON; 17	DON; 8	THR; Ret	THR; Ret	OUL; 24	OUL; 18	MON; C	MON; C	MAL; 20	MAL; 17	SNE; 18	SNE; Ret	KNO; 19	KNO; 14	OUL; Ret	OUL; 12	CRO; Ret	CRO; 16	CAD; Ret	CAD; 13	SIL; 11	SIL; 21	BHGP; 17	BHGP; 12	20th	33
