= Nicolás Terol =

Spanish motorcycle racer (born 1988)

- Terol in 2026
- Nationality: Spanish
- Born: 27 September 1988 (age 38); Alcoy, Province of Alicante, Valencia, Spain
- Website: nicoterol.com
Motorcycle racing career statistics
Moto2 World Championship
Active years	2012–2014
Manufacturers	Suter
Championships	0
2014 championship position	28th (2 pts)
Starts / Wins / Podiums / Poles / F. laps / Points; 50 / 3 / 5 / 1 / 1 / 189
125cc World Championship
Active years	2004–2011
Manufacturers	Aprilia, Derbi
Championships	1 (2011)
2011 championship position	1st (302 pts)
Starts / Wins / Podiums / Poles / F. laps / Points; 112 / 13 / 34 / 8 / 7 / 1026.5
MotoE World Championship
Active years	2019
Manufacturers	Energica
Championships	0
2019 championship position	12th (33 pts)
Starts / Wins / Podiums / Poles / F. laps / Points; 6 / 0 / 0 / 0 / 0 / 33
Superbike World Championship
Active years	2015
Manufacturers	Ducati
Championships	0
2015 championship position	17th (54 pts)
Starts / Wins / Podiums / Poles / F. laps / Points; 12 / 0 / 0 / 0 / 0 / 54
Supersport World Championship
Active years	2015–2016
Manufacturers	MV Agusta
Championships	0
2016 championship position	17th (31 pts)
Starts / Wins / Podiums / Poles / F. laps / Points; 11 / 0 / 1 / 0 / 0 / 54

Nicolás "Nico" Terol Peidro (born 27 September 1988) is a Spanish former motorcycle road racer, winner of the 125cc World Championship in 2011. He has previously competed in the Superbike World Championship and the Supersport World Championship.

== Career ==
=== 125cc World Championship ===
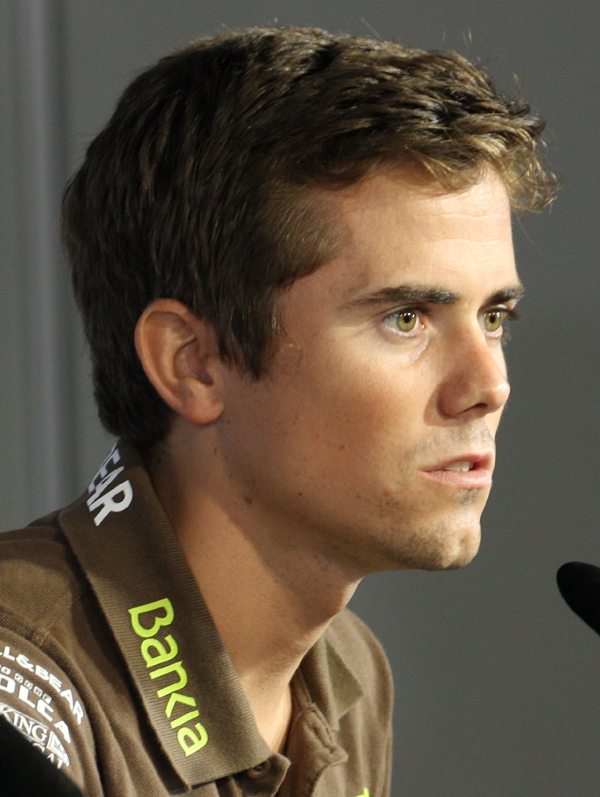
Terol at Brno in 2011.

Born in Alcoy, Province of Alicante Valencia, Spain, Terol began his professional racing career in 2005. He took his first international victory in the rain-shortened 2008 Indianapolis motorcycle Grand Prix as he was leading the race at the time of the final completed lap. He finished third in the 2009 championship, while he finished runner-up to Marc Márquez in the 2010 championship.

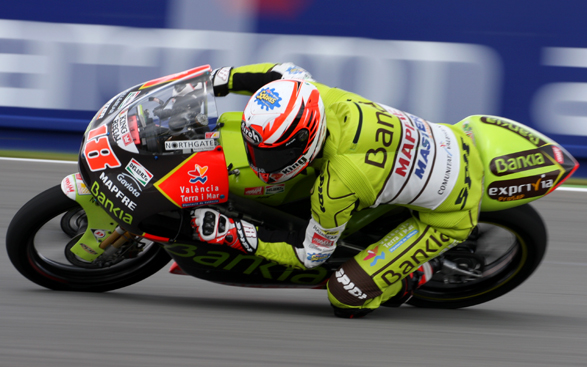
Terol at the 2011 Czech Republic Grand Prix.

In 2011, Terol won eight races during the season, and won the final world championship for the class, before it was replaced by Moto3 for 2012.

=== Moto2 World Championship ===
Terol moved up to the intermediate class, Moto2, for the 2012 season. Terol endured a testing season, which finished with a third-place finish on home soil in Valencia. In 2013, Terol won three races with the Aspar Team, en route to a seventh-place finish in the final championship standings. Terol struggled in the 2014 campaign, taking a solitary points-scoring finish – a 14th-place finish in Argentina – as he finished in 28th place in the final championship standings.

=== Superbike World Championship ===
Terol started 2015 competing in the Superbike World Championship with Althea Racing, riding a Ducati but left the team mid-season.

=== Supersport World Championship ===
Terol raced in the final three rounds of the 2015 Supersport World Championship, filling in for an injured Jules Cluzel with MV Augusta Reparto Corse. In 2016, he continued competing in the championship with Schmidt Racing, securing a podium in Aragon.

=== MotoE World Championship ===
In 2019, Terol returned to Grand Prix racing with the Ángel Nieto (formerly Aspar) Team to compete in the inaugural season of the MotoE World Championship. He finished the season in 12th before departing the championship.

=== Endurance World Championship ===
Terol joined the Endurance World Championship in 2020 as a back-up rider for VRD Igol Pierret Experiences.

=== Aspar Team Sporting Director ===
Terol returned to the Aspar Team in 2023 as sporting director, replacing the outgoing Gino Borsoi.

== Career statistics ==
=== Grand Prix motorcycle racing ===
==== By season ====
Season	Class	Motorcycle	Team	Race	Win	Podium	Pole	FLap	Pts	Plcd
2004	125cc	Aprilia	Globet.com Racing	1	0	0	0	0	0	NC
2005	125cc	Derbi	Caja Madrid - Derbi Racing	13	0	0	0	0	1	36th
2006	125cc	Derbi	Derbi Racing	16	0	0	0	0	53	14th
2007	125cc	Derbi	Valsir Seedorf Derbi	17	0	0	0	0	19	22nd
2008	125cc	Aprilia	Jack & Jones WRB	17	1	5	0	0	176	5th
2009	125cc	Aprilia	Jack & Jones Team	16	1	4	0	0	179.5	3rd
2010	125cc	Aprilia	Bancaja Aspar Team	16	3	14	1	2	296	2nd
2011	125cc	Aprilia	Bankia Aspar Team	16	8	11	7	5	302	1st
2012	Moto2	Suter	Mapfre Aspar Team Moto2	17	0	1	0	0	37	17th
2013	Moto2	Suter	Mapfre Aspar Team Moto2	17	3	4	1	1	150	7th
2014	Moto2	Suter	Mapfre Aspar Team Moto2	16	0	0	0	0	2	28th
2019	MotoE	Energica	Openbank Ángel Nieto Team	6	0	0	0	0	33	12th
Total				**168**	**16**	**39**	**9**	**8**	**1248.5**	

==== Races by year ====
(key) (Races in bold indicate pole position, races in italics indicate fastest lap)

Year	Class	Bike	1	2	3	4	5	6	7	8	9	10	11	12	13	14	15	16	17	18	Pos	Pts
2004	125cc	Aprilia	RSA	SPA	FRA	ITA	CAT	NED	BRA	GER	GBR	CZE	POR	JPN	QAT	MAL	AUS	VAL; 22			NC	0
2005	125cc	Derbi	SPA; 15	POR; 23	CHN; 26	FRA; 22	ITA; 21	CAT; Ret	NED; 16	GBR; 21	GER; Ret	CZE; 19	JPN	MAL	QAT	AUS; Ret	TUR; 16	VAL; 16			36th	1
2006	125cc	Derbi	SPA; 19	QAT; 16	TUR; 27	CHN; 19	FRA; Ret	ITA; 18	CAT; 11	NED; 15	GBR; 9	GER; 7	CZE; 7	MAL; 10	AUS; 11	JPN; 10	POR; Ret	VAL; 11			14th	53
2007	125cc	Derbi	QAT; 16	SPA; 14	TUR; 16	CHN; Ret	FRA; 19	ITA; 12	CAT; 23	GBR; 24	NED; 17	GER; 22	CZE; 22	RSM; 18	POR; Ret	JPN; 17	AUS; 13	MAL; 11	VAL; 11		22nd	19
2008	125cc	Aprilia	QAT; 10	SPA; 2	POR; 3	CHN; 8	FRA; 3	ITA; 7	CAT; Ret	GBR; 18	NED; 9	GER; 7	CZE; 5	RSM; 5	INP; 1	JPN; 5	AUS; Ret	MAL; 9	VAL; 2		5th	176
2009	125cc	Aprilia	QAT; 7	JPN; 17	SPA; 10	FRA; 9	ITA; 2	CAT; 2	NED; 5	GER; 4	GBR; 4	CZE; 1	INP; 4	RSM; 2	POR; Ret	AUS; 6	MAL; 5	VAL; 10			**3rd**	**179.5**
2010	125cc	Aprilia	QAT; 1	SPA; 2	**FRA**; 2	ITA; 2	GBR; 4	NED; 2	CAT; Ret	GER	CZE; 1	INP; 1	RSM; 2	ARA; 2	JPN; 2	MAL; 3	AUS; 3	POR; 2	VAL; 3		**2nd**	**296**
2011	125cc	Aprilia	**QAT**; 1	SPA; 1	**POR**; 1	**FRA**; 2	**CAT**; 1	GBR; 8	NED; DNS	ITA; 1	GER; 4	**CZE**; Ret	**INP**; 1	RSM; 1	ARA; 1	JPN; 2	AUS; 6	**MAL**; 5	VAL; 2		**1st**	**302**
2012	Moto2	Suter	QAT; 23	SPA; 27	POR; 16	FRA; 13	CAT; 15	GBR; 20	NED; 17	GER; 14	ITA; 13	INP; 13	CZE; 12	RSM; 15	ARA; 12	JPN; 18	MAL; Ret	AUS; 17	VAL; 3		17th	37
2013	Moto2	Suter	QAT; 14	AME; 1	SPA; 5	FRA; Ret	ITA; 2	CAT; 16	NED; 17	GER; Ret	INP; 12	CZE; 6	GBR; 11	RSM; 10	**ARA**; 1	MAL; 18	AUS; 9	JPN; 6	VAL; 1		7th	150
2014	Moto2	Suter	QAT; Ret	AME; Ret	ARG; 14	SPA; DNS	FRA; 21	ITA; 24	CAT; 20	NED; 22	GER; 19	INP; 21	CZE; 25	GBR	RSM; Ret	ARA; 29	JPN; 22	AUS; 18	MAL; 24	VAL; 18	28th	2
2019	MotoE	Energica	GER; 10	AUT; 14	RSM1; 8	RSM2; 9	VAL1; 13	VAL2; 9													12th	33

=== Superbike World Championship ===
==== Races by year ====
(key) (Races in bold indicate pole position, races in italics indicate fastest lap)

Year	Bike	1		2		3		4		5		6		7		8		9		10		11		12		13		Pos	Pts
Year	Bike	R1	R2	R1	R2	R1	R2	R1	R2	R1	R2	R1	R2	R1	R2	R1	R2	R1	R2	R1	R2	R1	R2	R1	R2	R1	R2	Pos	Pts
2015	Ducati	AUS; 8	AUS; 6	THA; 12	THA; 12	SPA; 7	SPA; 10	NED; 9	NED; Ret	ITA	ITA	GBR; 12	GBR; Ret	POR; 15	POR; 15	ITA	ITA	USA	USA	MAL	MAL	SPA	SPA	FRA	FRA	QAT	QAT	17th	54

=== Supersport World Championship ===
==== Races by year ====
(key) (Races in bold indicate pole position, races in italics indicate fastest lap)

Year	Bike	1	2	3	4	5	6	7	8	9	10	11	12	Pos	Pts
2015	MV Agusta	AUS	THA	SPA	NED	ITA	GBR	POR	ITA	MAL	SPA; 5	FRA; 14	QAT; 6	18th	23
2016	MV Agusta	AUS; 11	THA; Ret	SPA; 3	NED; 13	ITA; 9	MAL; Ret	GBR; Ret	ITA; 18	GER	FRA	SPA	QAT	17th	31
