= Sofuoğlu family =

Turkish family

The three brothers Bahattin, Sinan and Kenan Sofuoğlu have been some of the most successful Turkish motorcycle racers. Their father İrfan Basri Sofuoğlu, a motorcycle enthusiast since 1965, ran a motorcycle repair shop in the Kuzuluk town of Akyazı district in the Sakarya Province. The family moved 1992 to Adapazarı, where the father opened up a motorcycle dealer and repair shop.

- Bahattin Sofuoğlu Sr. (1 January 1978, Adapazarı, Turkey – 25 October 2002) was a successful motorcycle racer for the Turkish Honda team. As son of a motorcycle dealer, he started racing in 1997 at the age of nineteen.
- Sinan Sofuoğlu (born 1982, Adapazarı – 9 May 2008) was a successful Turkish motorcycle racer. Starting racing at 15, Sinan became drag champion in 1998. He continued his victories with championships won in Group B in 1999, and in Group A in the years 2001, 2002 and 2004. He finished the 2003 season in second. Sinan Sofuoğlu also won the Turkish championship in 2005. He had a single wild-card ride in the Turkish 250 cc round of Moto GP at Istanbul Park in April 2006.
- Kenan Sofuoğlu (born 25 August 1984, Akyazı) is a Turkish former professional motorcycle racer, who won the highest number of Supersport World Championship titles – five, in 2007, 2010, 2012, 2015 and 2016.
- Bahattin Sofuoğlu Jr. (born 19 August 2003, Adapazarı) is the third generation motorcycle racer of the Sofuoğlu Family competing in SBK.
