= Akyazı =

- District and municipality
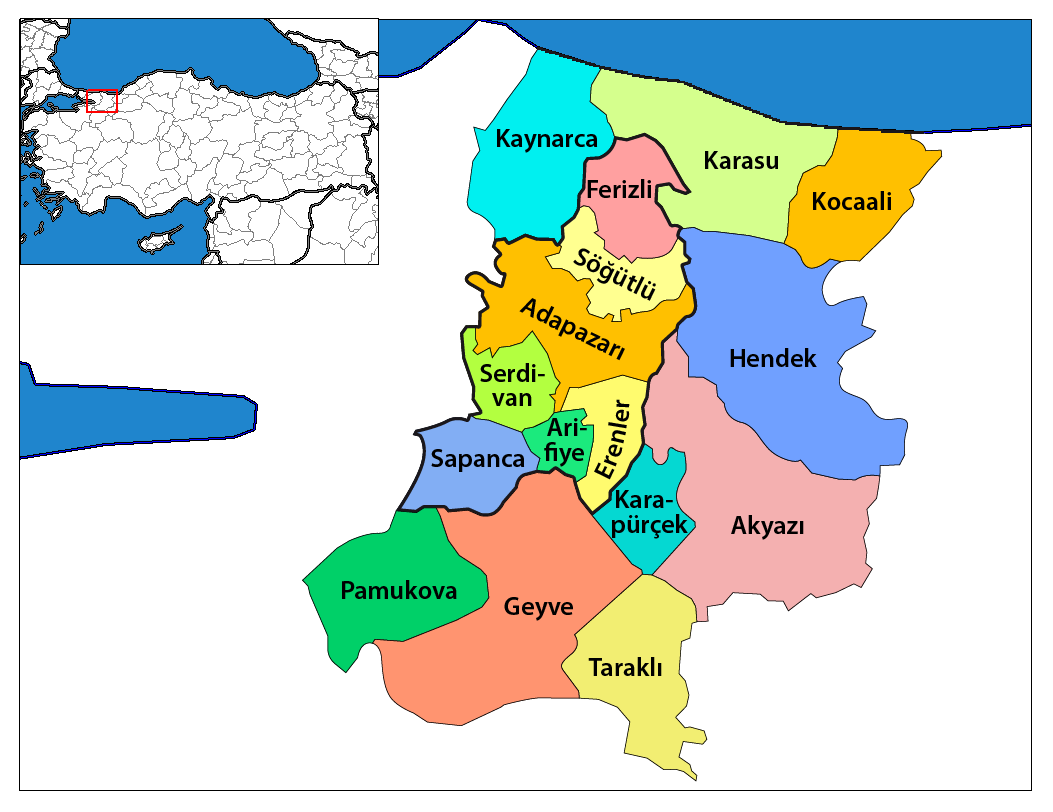
- Map showing Akyazı District in Sakarya Province

- Location within Turkey Location within Marmara
- Coordinates: 40°41′00″N 30°37′31″E
- Country: Turkey
- Province: Sakarya

Government
  - Mayor: Bilal Soykan (AKP)
- Area: 628 km^{2} (242 sq mi)
- Population (2024): 101,782
  - Density: 162/km^{2} (420/sq mi)
- Time zone: UTC+3 (TRT)
- Postal code: 54400
- Area code: 0264
- Climate: Cfa
- Website: www.akyazi.bel.tr

Akyazı is a municipality and district of Sakarya Province, Turkey. Its area is 628 km^{2}, and its population is 94,494 (2022). The mayor is Bilal Soykan (AKP).

== Composition ==
There are 76 neighbourhoods in Akyazı District:

- Akbalık
- Alaağaç
- Altındere Cumhuriyet
- Altındere Gündoğan
- Altındere Osmanağa
- Ballıkaya
- Batakköy
- Bedil Kazancı
- Bedilkadirbey
- Bediltahirbey
- Beldibi
- Bıçkıdere
- Boztepe
- Buğdaylı
- Çakıroğlu
- Çatalköprü
- Çıldırlar
- Cumhuriyet
- Cumhuriyet (Küçücek)
- Dedeler
- Dokurcun Çaylar Yeni Mahalle
- Dokurcun Çengeller
- Dokurcun Kuloğlu
- Durmuşlar
- Düzyazı
- Erdoğdu
- Eskibedil
- Fatih
- G. Süleymanpaşa
- Gebeş
- Gökçeler
- Güvençler
- Güzlek
- Hanyatak
- Harunusta
- Hasanbey
- Hastane
- Haydarlar
- İnönü
- Kabakulak
- Karaçalılık
- Kepekli
- Kızılcıkorman
- Konuralp
- Küçücek İstiklal
- Kumköprü
- Kuzuluk Ortamahalle
- Kuzuluk Şose
- Kuzuluk Topçusırtı
- Madenler
- Mansurlar
- Merkez Yeniköy
- Ömercikler
- Osmanbey
- Pazarköy
- Reşadiye
- Salihiye
- Şerefiye
- Seyfeler
- Sukenarı
- Taşağıl
- Taşburun
- Taşyatak
- Topağaç
- Türkormanköy
- Uzunçınar
- Vakıf
- Yağcılar
- Yahyalı
- Yeni
- Yenidoğan
- Yeniorman
- Yongalık
- Yörükyeri
- Yunusemre
- Yuvalık

== Electrocution incident ==
On 23 June 2017, five people died of electrocution after a swimming pool at a water park in Akyazı became electrified. Three children aged 12, 15 and 17 were the first to be electrocuted. The park's manager Mehmet Kaya, 58, and his son Kadir Kaya, 30, dived in to save them but were also seriously injured. The five victims died in hospital; another person was seriously injured during the incident and was taken to hospital.

== Notable people ==
- Sofuoğlu family, three champion motorcycle racers
