= Bahattin Sofuoğlu (motorcyclist, born 2003) =

Turkish motorcycle racer (born 2003)

- Nationality: Turkish
- Born: 19 August 2003 (age 23); Adapazarı, Turkey
- Current team: Yamaha Motoxracing WorldSBK Team
- Bike number: 99
Motorcycle racing career statistics
Superbike World Championship
Active years	2025–present
Manufacturers	Yamaha
2026 championship position	25th (4 pts)
Starts / Wins / Podiums / Poles / F. laps / Points; 60 / 0 / 0 / 0 / 0 / 30
Supersport World Championship
Active years	2022-2024
Manufacturers	MV Agusta (2022-2024); Yamaha (2024)
Championships	0
2024 championship position	12th (103 pts)
Starts / Wins / Podiums / Poles / F. laps / Points; 63 / 1 / 4 / 0 / 2 / 343
Supersport 300 World Championship
Active years	2018–2021
Manufacturers	Yamaha (2018, 2020–2021); Kawasaki (2019)
2021 championship position	6th (131 pts)
Starts / Wins / Podiums / Poles / F. laps / Points; 34 / 4 / 8 / 2 / 1 / 274

Bahattin Sofuoğlu (born 19 August 2003) is a Turkish professional motorcycle racer, being the third generation member of the Sofuoğlu family in this sport. He competes in the Superbike World Championship for Yamaha Thailand Racing Team.

== Personal life ==
Sofuoğlu was born on 19 August 2003, and was named after his paternal cousin Bahattin Sofuoğlu (1978–2002), who died following a crash during a motorcycle race training.

== Career ==
Sofuoğlu debuted internationally in the Supersport 300 World Championship racing for the Italian Team Trasimeno on a Yamaha YZF-R3 at the Algarve International Circuit in Portugal. He started from the 34th grid among 40 racers in the seventh round of the championship on 14-16 September 2018, and placed 17th.

Racing for Biblion Motoxracing on a Yamaha YZF-R3, Sofuoğlu finished the 2020 Supersport 300 World Championship on third place with 143 points after ranking fourth in the second race of the last round at the Circuito do Estoril in Portugal.

Sofuoğlu won the Super pole in the second round of 2021 Supersport 300 World Championship at Misano World Circuit Marco Simoncelli in Italy.

For the 2022 season, Sofuoğlu graduated to the World Supersport Championship to ride for the MV Agusta Reparto Corse team, also winning the WorldSSP Challenge the same year.

== Career statistics ==
=== Asia Talent Cup ===
==== Races by year ====
(key) (Races in bold indicate pole position; races in italics indicate fastest lap)

Year	Bike	1	2	3	4	5	6	7	8	9	10	11	12	Pos	Pts
2016	Honda	THA1	THA2	QAT1; 15	QAT2; Ret	MAL1; Ret	MAL2; 13	CHN1; 12	CHN2; 12	JPN1; 14	JPN2; 12	SEP1; Ret	SEP2; 6	16th	28

=== Supersport 300 World Championship ===
==== Races by year ====
(key) (Races in bold indicate pole position; races in italics indicate fastest lap)

Year	Bike	1	2	3	4	5	6	7	8	9	10	11	12	13	14	15	16	Pos	Pts
2018	Yamaha	SPA	NED	ITA	GBR	CZE	ITA	POR; 17	FRA; DNS									NC	0
2019	Kawasaki	SPA; Ret	NED; DNQ	ITA; WD	SPA; DNQ	SPA; DNQ	ITA; DNQ	GBR; WD	POR; Ret	FRA; 23	QAT							NC	0
2020	Yamaha	SPA; 5	SPA; 1	POR; 5	POR; 5	SPA; Ret	SPA; Ret	**SPA**; 1	**SPA**; 3	SPA; 9	SPA; 10	FRA; 3	FRA; Ret	POR; 14	POR; 4			3rd	143
2021	Yamaha	SPA; NC	SPA; Ret	**ITA**; Ret	**ITA**; 6	NED; 5	NED; 32	CZE; 5	CZE; Ret	FRA; Ret	FRA; Ret	SPA; 2	SPA; 1	SPA; 3	SPA; 1	POR; 4	POR; 17	6th	131

=== Supersport World Championship ===
==== Races by year ====
(key) (Races in bold indicate pole position; races in italics indicate fastest lap)

Year	Bike	1	2	3	4	5	6	7	8	9	10	11	12	13	14	15	16	17	18	19	20	21	22	23	24	Pos	Pts
2022	MV Agusta	SPA; 12	SPA; 14	NED; 15	NED; 10	POR; 23	POR; 14	ITA; 21	ITA; 18	GBR; 15	GBR; Ret	CZE; 7	CZE; 5	FRA; Ret	FRA; DNS	SPA; 5	SPA; 7	POR; 11	POR; 5	ARG	ARG	INA	INA	AUS	AUS	14th	72
2023	MV Agusta	AUS; Ret	AUS; 11	INA; 9	INA; 10	NED; 11	NED; Ret	SPA; 3	SPA; 1	ITA; Ret	ITA; 7	GBR; 13	GBR; 8	ITA; 4	ITA; Ret	CZE; 3	CZE; 3	FRA; 9	FRA; Ret	SPA; 6	SPA; 4	POR; 7	POR; 17	ARG; 16	ARG; Ret	6th	168
2024	MV Agusta	AUS; 6	AUS; 6	SPA; 10	SPA; 6	NED; 8	NED; 5	ITA; Ret	ITA; Ret	GBR; 6	GBR; Ret	CZE; Ret	CZE; Ret	POR; DNS	POR; DNS	FRA; 16	FRA; Ret	ITA; 10	ITA; 11	SPA; 10	SPA; Ret					12th	103
2024	Yamaha																					POR; 10	POR; 8	SPA; Ret	SPA; 9	12th	103

=== Superbike World Championship ===
==== By season ====
Season	Motorcycle	Team	Race	Win	Podium	Pole	FLap	Pts	Plcd
2025	Yamaha YZF-R1	Yamaha Motoxracing WorldSBK Team	36	0	0	0	0	26	21st
2026	Yamaha YZF-R1	Yamaha Motoxracing WorldSBK Team	24	0	0	0	0	4	25th
Total			**60**	**0**	**0**	**0**	**0**	**30**	

==== Races by year ====
(key) (Races in bold indicate pole position) (Races in italics indicate fastest lap)

Year	Bike	1			2			3			4			5			6			7			8			9			10			11			12			Pos	Pts
Year	Bike	R1	SR	R2	R1	SR	R2	R1	SR	R2	R1	SR	R2	R1	SR	R2	R1	SR	R2	R1	SR	R2	R1	SR	R2	R1	SR	R2	R1	SR	R2	R1	SR	R2	R1	SR	R2	Pos	Pts
2025	Yamaha	AUS; 15	AUS; 17	AUS; 16	POR; 13	POR; Ret	POR; 13	NED; Ret	NED; 18	NED; 15	ITA; 17	ITA; 19	ITA; 17	CZE; 15	CZE; 16	CZE; 17	ITA; Ret	ITA; 15	ITA; 13	GBR; 15	GBR; 16	GBR; 17	HUN; 15	HUN; 14	HUN; 13	FRA; 10	FRA; 15	FRA; 17	SPA; 16	SPA; 17	SPA; Ret	POR; Ret	POR; 14	POR; 14	SPA; 16	SPA; 13	SPA; 15	21st	26
2026	Yamaha	AUS; 16	AUS; 19	AUS; 15	POR; 20	POR; Ret	POR; Ret	NED; 20	NED; 20	NED; 20	HUN; 18	HUN; 18	HUN; 13	CZE; 16	CZE; Ret	CZE; 16	SPA; 18	SPA; 16	SPA; 16	ITA; 16	ITA; 16	ITA; Ret	GBR; 17	GBR; 14	GBR; 19	FRA; WD	FRA; WD	FRA; WD	ITA	ITA	ITA	POR	POR	POR	SPA	SPA	SPA	25th	4

* Season still in progress.
