= 2006 Qatar motorcycle Grand Prix =

2006 Qatar Grand Prix
Race details
- Race 2 of 17 races in the 2006 Grand Prix motorcycle racing season
- Date: 8 April 2006
- Official name: Commercialbank Grand Prix of Qatar
- Location: Losail International Circuit
- Course: Permanent racing facility; 5.380 km (3.343 mi)

MotoGP
Pole position
- Rider: (Australia) Casey Stoner
- Time: 1:55.683
Fastest lap
- Rider: (Italy) Valentino Rossi
- Time: 1:57.305
Podium
- First: (Italy) Valentino Rossi
- Second: (United States) Nicky Hayden
- Third: (Italy) Loris Capirossi

250cc
Pole position
- Rider: (Spain) Jorge Lorenzo
- Time: 2:01.755
Fastest lap
- Rider: (Italy) Andrea Dovizioso
- Time: 2:03.246
Podium
- First: (Spain) Jorge Lorenzo
- Second: (Italy) Andrea Dovizioso
- Third: (Italy) Roberto Locatelli

125cc
Pole position
- Rider: (Spain) Álvaro Bautista
- Time: 2:07.453
Fastest lap
- Rider: (Spain) Álvaro Bautista
- Time: 2:08.591
Podium
- First: (Spain) Álvaro Bautista
- Second: (Finland) Mika Kallio
- Third: (Spain) Sergio Gadea

The 2006 Qatar motorcycle Grand Prix was the second race of the 2006 Motorcycle Grand Prix season. It took place on the weekend of 6–8 April 2006 at the Losail Circuit.

== MotoGP classification ==
Pos.	No.	Rider	Team	Manufacturer	Laps	Time/Retired	Grid	Points
1	46	(Italy) Valentino Rossi	Camel Yamaha Team	Yamaha	22	43:22.229	6	25
2	69	(United States) Nicky Hayden	Repsol Honda Team	Honda	22	+0.900	4	20
3	65	(Italy) Loris Capirossi	Ducati Marlboro Team	Ducati	22	+1.494	2	16
4	15	(Spain) Sete Gibernau	Ducati Marlboro Team	Ducati	22	+4.638	7	13
5	27	(Australia) Casey Stoner	Honda LCR	Honda	22	+7.575	1	11
6	26	(Spain) Dani Pedrosa	Repsol Honda Team	Honda	22	+10.820	5	10
7	33	(Italy) Marco Melandri	Fortuna Honda	Honda	22	+11.784	12	9
8	24	(Spain) Toni Elías	Fortuna Honda	Honda	22	+19.481	3	8
9	5	(United States) Colin Edwards	Camel Yamaha Team	Yamaha	22	+22.920	8	7
10	10	(United States) Kenny Roberts Jr.	Team Roberts	KR211V	22	+34.286	10	6
11	56	(Japan) Shinya Nakano	Kawasaki Racing Team	Kawasaki	22	+35.316	9	5
12	7	(Spain) Carlos Checa	Tech 3 Yamaha	Yamaha	22	+49.245	14	4
13	77	(United Kingdom) James Ellison	Tech 3 Yamaha	Yamaha	22	+1:01.469	17	3
14	6	(Japan) Makoto Tamada	Konica Minolta Honda	Honda	22	+1:10.778	16	2
15	66	(Germany) Alex Hofmann	Pramac d'Antin MotoGP	Ducati	22	+1:22.051	18	1
16	30	(Spain) José Luis Cardoso	Pramac d'Antin MotoGP	Ducati	22	+1:33.818	19	
Ret	71	(Australia) Chris Vermeulen	Rizla Suzuki MotoGP	Suzuki	7	Retirement	11	
Ret	21	(United States) John Hopkins	Rizla Suzuki MotoGP	Suzuki	4	Retirement	13	
Ret	17	(France) Randy de Puniet	Kawasaki Racing Team	Kawasaki	0	Accident	15	

== 250 cc classification ==
Pos.	No.	Rider	Manufacturer	Laps	Time/Retired	Grid	Points
1	48	(Spain) Jorge Lorenzo	Aprilia	20	41:29.946	1	25
2	34	(Italy) Andrea Dovizioso	Honda	20	+0.077	6	20
3	15	(Italy) Roberto Locatelli	Aprilia	20	+19.364	3	16
4	80	(Spain) Héctor Barberá	Aprilia	20	+19.398	2	13
5	4	(Japan) Hiroshi Aoyama	KTM	20	+24.051	8	11
6	50	(France) Sylvain Guintoli	Aprilia	20	+28.695	10	10
7	19	(Argentina) Sebastián Porto	Honda	20	+33.255	5	9
8	58	(Italy) Marco Simoncelli	Gilera	20	+34.214	13	8
9	55	(Japan) Yuki Takahashi	Honda	20	+34.406	11	7
10	96	(Czech Republic) Jakub Smrž	Aprilia	20	+34.419	7	6
11	36	(Colombia) Martín Cárdenas	Honda	20	+49.121	21	5
12	8	(Italy) Andrea Ballerini	Aprilia	20	+1:00.069	14	4
13	73	(Japan) Shuhei Aoyama	Honda	20	+1:00.633	16	3
14	54	(San Marino) Manuel Poggiali	KTM	20	+1:04.619	9	2
15	28	(Germany) Dirk Heidolf	Aprilia	20	+1:12.332	15	1
16	21	(France) Arnaud Vincent	Honda	20	+1:13.128	19	
17	57	(United Kingdom) Chaz Davies	Aprilia	20	+1:44.684	23	
18	22	(Italy) Luca Morelli	Aprilia	20	+1:59.950	25	
19	41	(Italy) Michele Danese	Aprilia	19	+1 lap	26	
20	85	(Italy) Alessio Palumbo	Aprilia	19	+1 lap	24	
Ret	24	(Spain) Jordi Carchano	Honda	15	Accident	22	
Ret	16	(France) Jules Cluzel	Aprilia	6	Retirement	17	
Ret	14	(Australia) Anthony West	Aprilia	6	Retirement	12	
Ret	23	(Spain) Arturo Tizón	Honda	4	Accident	20	
Ret	25	(Italy) Alex Baldolini	Aprilia	3	Retirement	18	
Ret	7	(San Marino) Alex de Angelis	Aprilia	0	Accident	4	

== 125 cc classification ==
Pos.	No.	Rider	Manufacturer	Laps	Time/Retired	Grid	Points
1	19	(Spain) Álvaro Bautista	Aprilia	18	38:56.548	1	25
2	36	(Finland) Mika Kallio	KTM	18	+6.765	3	20
3	33	(Spain) Sergio Gadea	Aprilia	18	+6.775	4	16
4	75	(Italy) Mattia Pasini	Aprilia	18	+8.327	2	13
5	22	(Spain) Pablo Nieto	Aprilia	18	+14.551	7	11
6	55	(Spain) Héctor Faubel	Aprilia	18	+15.266	9	10
7	10	(Spain) Ángel Rodríguez	Aprilia	18	+15.356	11	9
8	1	(Switzerland) Thomas Lüthi	Honda	18	+16.236	15	8
9	24	(Italy) Simone Corsi	Gilera	18	+22.770	18	7
10	60	(Spain) Julián Simón	KTM	18	+23.137	10	6
11	14	(Hungary) Gábor Talmácsi	Honda	18	+29.516	6	5
12	35	(Italy) Raffaele De Rosa	Aprilia	18	+29.527	16	4
13	29	(Italy) Andrea Iannone	Aprilia	18	+42.997	12	3
14	32	(Italy) Fabrizio Lai	Honda	18	+45.532	20	2
15	71	(Japan) Tomoyoshi Koyama	Malaguti	18	+58.675	19	1
16	18	(Spain) Nicolás Terol	Derbi	18	+59.145	28	
17	41	(Spain) Aleix Espargaró	Honda	18	+1:00.762	23	
18	15	(Italy) Michele Pirro	Aprilia	18	+1:02.635	24	
19	43	(Spain) Manuel Hernández	Aprilia	18	+1:06.073	26	
20	26	(Switzerland) Vincent Braillard	Aprilia	18	+1:12.674	30	
21	8	(Italy) Lorenzo Zanetti	Aprilia	18	+1:14.590	13	
22	38	(United Kingdom) Bradley Smith	Honda	18	+1:14.885	22	
23	53	(Italy) Simone Grotzkyj	Aprilia	18	+1:16.297	29	
24	44	(Czech Republic) Karel Abraham	Aprilia	18	+1:17.279	34	
25	21	(Spain) Mateo Túnez	Aprilia	18	+1:17.320	25	
26	17	(Germany) Stefan Bradl	KTM	18	+1:21.292	33	
27	37	(Netherlands) Joey Litjens	Honda	18	+1:43.507	36	
28	16	(Italy) Michele Conti	Honda	18	+1:46.382	35	
29	20	(Italy) Roberto Tamburini	Aprilia	18	+1:46.627	37	
30	23	(Italy) Lorenzo Baroni	Honda	18	+1:47.243	31	
Ret	52	(Czech Republic) Lukáš Pešek	Derbi	17	Retirement	5	
Ret	12	(Italy) Federico Sandi	Aprilia	5	Accident	14	
Ret	45	(Hungary) Imre Tóth	Aprilia	5	Retirement	27	
Ret	9	(Austria) Michael Ranseder	KTM	5	Accident	32	
Ret	11	(Germany) Sandro Cortese	Honda	2	Accident	17	
Ret	6	(Spain) Joan Olivé	Aprilia	2	Accident	8	
Ret	63	(France) Mike Di Meglio	Honda	1	Retirement	21	
DNS	7	(France) Alexis Masbou	Malaguti		Did not start		

== Championship standings after the race (MotoGP) ==
Below are the standings for the top five riders and constructors after round two has concluded.

Riders' Championship standings

Pos.	Rider	Points
1	(Italy) Loris Capirossi	41
2	(United States) Nicky Hayden	36
3	(Spain) Dani Pedrosa	30
4	(Italy) Valentino Rossi	27
5	(Spain) Toni Elías	21

Constructors' Championship standings

Pos.	Constructor	Points
1	(Italy) Ducati	41
2	(Japan) Honda	40
3	(Japan) Yamaha	30
4	(Japan) Kawasaki	14
5	(United States) KR211V	14

- Note: Only the top five positions are included for both sets of standings.

Previous race: 2006 Spanish Grand Prix	FIM Grand Prix World Championship; 2006 season	Next race: 2006 Turkish Grand Prix
Previous race: 2005 Qatar Grand Prix	Qatar motorcycle Grand Prix	Next race: 2007 Qatar Grand Prix
