= Bahattin Sofuoğlu =

Turkish motorcycle racer (1978-2002)

Bahattin Sofuoğlu (1 January 1978 - 25 October 2002) born in Adapazarı, Turkey was a successful motorcycle racer for the Turkish Honda team.

As the son of a motorcycle repairman, Sofuoğlu started racing in 1997 at the age of nineteen. His two brothers Sinan and Kenan were also motorcycle racers. Sinan Sofuoğlu died on May 9, 2008, at the age of 25 in the intensive care unit of Kocaeli University Hospital following a motorcycle crash. He was training for the Turkey Motorcycle Championship at İzmit Körfez Circuit in Körfez, Kocaeli, where he fell off his motorcycle and suffered a broken neck, trauma at the base of his skull, and pulmonary hemorrhage. His first cousin once removed was named after him.

== Achievements ==
- 1999 Turkish Motorcycle Circuit Championship Supersport Class A champion
- 2000 Turkish Motorcycle Circuit Championship Supersport Class A champion
- 2001 Turkish Motorcycle Circuit Championship Supersport Class A champion

== See also ==
- Sofuoğlu family
