= 2022 FIM Endurance World Championship =

43rd season of the FIM Endurance World Championship (EWC)

The 2022 FIM Endurance World Championship (FIM EWC) marked the 43rd season of the motorcycle racing series, organised jointly by the Fédération Internationale de Motocyclisme (FIM) and Discovery Sports Events, a division of Warner Bros. Discovery.

The 2022 season featured four rounds, starting with the 45th 24 Heures Motos at Le Mans, followed by the return of Circuit de Spa-Francorchamps for the 24H SPA EWC Motos, the Suzuka 8 Hours in Japan and the 100th anniversary Bol d'Or at Circuit Paul Ricard in France.

== Calendar ==
| Rnd | Race | Circuit | Location | Date |
|---|---|---|---|---|
| 1 | 24 Heures Motos | (France) Bugatti Circuit | Le Mans, France | 16–17 April |
| 2 | 24H Spa EWC Motos | (Belgium) Circuit de Spa-Francorchamps | Stavelot, Belgium | 4–5 June |
| 3 | Suzuka 8 Hours | (Japan) Suzuka International Racing Course | Suzuka, Mie, Japan | 7 August |
| 4 | Bol d'Or | (France) Circuit Paul Ricard | Le Castellet, Var, France | 17–18 September |

== Teams and riders ==
FIM EWC teams
| No. | Team | Bike | Tyre | Riders | Rounds |
|---|---|---|---|---|---|
| 1 | (France) Yoshimura SERT Motul | Suzuki GSX-R1000 | B | (France) Gregg Black | All |
| 1 | (France) Yoshimura SERT Motul | Suzuki GSX-R1000 | B | (France) Sylvain Guintoli | 1–2 |
| 1 | (France) Yoshimura SERT Motul | Suzuki GSX-R1000 | B | (Belgium) Xavier Simeon | All |
| 1 | (France) Yoshimura SERT Motul | Suzuki GSX-R1000 | B | (Japan) Kazuki Watanabe | 3 |
| 4 | (France) Tati Team Beringer Racing | Kawasaki Ninja ZX-10RR | MI | (France) Alan Techer | All |
| 4 | (France) Tati Team Beringer Racing | Kawasaki Ninja ZX-10RR | MI | (Belgium) Bastien Mackels | 1 |
| 4 | (France) Tati Team Beringer Racing | Kawasaki Ninja ZX-10RR | MI | (France) Grégory Leblanc | All |
| 4 | (France) Tati Team Beringer Racing | Kawasaki Ninja ZX-10RR | MI | (France) Loic Arbel | 2 |
| 5 | (Japan) F.C.C. TSR Honda France | Honda CBR1000RR-R | B | (United Kingdom) Gino Rea | All |
| 5 | (Japan) F.C.C. TSR Honda France | Honda CBR1000RR-R | B | (Australia) Joshua Hook | All |
| 5 | (Japan) F.C.C. TSR Honda France | Honda CBR1000RR-R | B | (France) Mike Di Meglio | All |
| 6 | (France) Team ERC Endurance | Ducati Panigale V4 R | P | (Spain) David Checa | All |
| 6 | (France) Team ERC Endurance | Ducati Panigale V4 R | P | (Spain) Javier Fores | All |
| 6 | (France) Team ERC Endurance | Ducati Panigale V4 R | P | (Germany) Philipp Öttl | 1 |
| 6 | (France) Team ERC Endurance | Ducati Panigale V4 R | P | (United Kingdom) Chaz Davies | 2 |
| 7 | (Austria) YART–Yamaha EWC Team | Yamaha YZF-R1 | B | (Germany) Marvin Fritz | All |
| 7 | (Austria) YART–Yamaha EWC Team | Yamaha YZF-R1 | B | (Italy) Niccolo Canepa | All |
| 7 | (Austria) YART–Yamaha EWC Team | Yamaha YZF-R1 | B | (Czech Republic) Karel Hanika | All |
| 8 | Team Bolliger Switzerland #8 | Kawasaki Ninja ZX-10RR | MI | (Germany) Jan Bühn | All |
| 8 | Team Bolliger Switzerland #8 | Kawasaki Ninja ZX-10RR | MI | (Sweden) Jesper Pellijeff | All |
| 8 | Team Bolliger Switzerland #8 | Kawasaki Ninja ZX-10RR | MI | (Austria) Nico Thöni | All |
| 9 | (France) Tecmas Racing Team | BMW M1000RR | MI | (France) Camille Hedelin | 1 |
| 9 | (France) Tecmas Racing Team | BMW M1000RR | MI | (Germany) Marc Moser | 1 |
| 9 | (France) Tecmas Racing Team | BMW M1000RR | MI | (France) Maxime Bonnot | 1 |
| 10 | (Japan) Kawasaki Racing Team Suzuka 8H | Kawasaki ZX-10RR | B | (United Kingdom) Jonathan Rea | 3 |
| 10 | (Japan) Kawasaki Racing Team Suzuka 8H | Kawasaki ZX-10RR | B | (United Kingdom) Alex Lowes | 3 |
| 10 | (Japan) Kawasaki Racing Team Suzuka 8H | Kawasaki ZX-10RR | B | (United Kingdom) Leon Haslam | 3 |
| 11 | Webike SRC Kawasaki France | Kawasaki Ninja ZX-10RR | D | (France) Etienne Masson | All |
| 11 | Webike SRC Kawasaki France | Kawasaki Ninja ZX-10RR | D | (France) Florian Marino | All |
| 11 | Webike SRC Kawasaki France | Kawasaki Ninja ZX-10RR | D | (France) Randy de Puniet | All |
| 14 | (Slovakia) Maco Racing Team | Yamaha YZF-R1 | D | (Australia) Anthony West | All |
| 14 | (Slovakia) Maco Racing Team | Yamaha YZF-R1 | D | (France) Enzo Boulom | All |
| 14 | (Slovakia) Maco Racing Team | Yamaha YZF-R1 | D | (Hungary) Richard Bodis | 1 |
| 14 | (Slovakia) Maco Racing Team | Yamaha YZF-R1 | D | (Czech Republic) Ladislav Schmelik | 2 |
| 17 | (Japan) Astemo Honda Dream SI Racing | Honda CBR1000RR-R SP | B | (Japan) Kazuma Watanabe | 3 |
| 17 | (Japan) Astemo Honda Dream SI Racing | Honda CBR1000RR-R SP | B | (Japan) Kosuke Sakumoto | 3 |
| 17 | (Japan) Astemo Honda Dream SI Racing | Honda CBR1000RR-R SP | B | (Japan) Taiga Hada | 3 |
| 30 | (France) Team GT Endurance | Yamaha YZF-R1 | MI | (France) Karl Croix | All |
| 30 | (France) Team GT Endurance | Yamaha YZF-R1 | MI | (France) Paul Dufour | All |
| 30 | (France) Team GT Endurance | Yamaha YZF-R1 | MI | (France) Gillian Fondard | All |
| 33 | (Japan) Team HRC | Honda CBR1000RR-R SP | B | (Japan) Takumi Takahashi | 3 |
| 33 | (Japan) Team HRC | Honda CBR1000RR-R SP | B | (Spain) Iker Lecuona | 3 |
| 33 | (Japan) Team HRC | Honda CBR1000RR-R SP | B | (Japan) Tetsuta Nagashima | 3 |
| 37 | (Belgium) BMW Motorrad World Endurance Team | BMW M1000RR | D | (Ukraine) Illia Mykhalchyk | All |
| 37 | (Belgium) BMW Motorrad World Endurance Team | BMW M1000RR | D | (France) Jérémy Guarnoni | All |
| 37 | (Belgium) BMW Motorrad World Endurance Team | BMW M1000RR | D | (Germany) Markus Reiterberger | All |
| 65 | (Germany) Motobox Kremer Racing | Yamaha YZF-R1 | D | (France) Geoffroy Dehaye | All |
| 65 | (Germany) Motobox Kremer Racing | Yamaha YZF-R1 | D | (Austria) Lukas Walchhutter | All |
| 65 | (Germany) Motobox Kremer Racing | Yamaha YZF-R1 | D | (Germany) Stefan Strohlein | All |
| 77 | (Poland) Wójcik Racing Team | Yamaha YZF-R1 | D | (Hungary) Balint Kovacs | All |
| 77 | (Poland) Wójcik Racing Team | Yamaha YZF-R1 | D | (South Africa) Sheridan Morais | 2 |
| 77 | (Poland) Wójcik Racing Team | Yamaha YZF-R1 | D | (United Kingdom) Dan Linfoot | 2 |
| 77 | (Poland) Wójcik Racing Team | Yamaha YZF-R1 | D | (Switzerland) Robin Mulhauser | 1 |
| 77 | (Poland) Wójcik Racing Team | Yamaha YZF-R1 | D | (France) Mathieu Gines | 1 |
| 88 | (Japan) Honda Asia-Dream Racing with Showa | Honda CBR1000RR-R SP | B | (Malaysia) Zaqhwan Zaidi | 3 |
| 88 | (Japan) Honda Asia-Dream Racing with Showa | Honda CBR1000RR-R SP | B | (Indonesia) Gerry Salim | 3 |
| 88 | (Japan) Honda Asia-Dream Racing with Showa | Honda CBR1000RR-R SP | B | (Malaysia) Helmi Azman | 3 |
| 90 | Team LPR Poland | BMW S1000RR | P | (Germany) Dominik Vincon | All |
| 90 | Team LPR Poland | BMW S1000RR | P | (Poland) Bartlomiej Lewandowski | All |
| 90 | Team LPR Poland | BMW S1000RR | P | (Austria) Stefan Kerschbaumer | 1 |
| 90 | Team LPR Poland | BMW S1000RR | P | (Netherlands) Pepijn Bijsterbosch | 2 |
| 95 | (Japan) S-Pulse Dream Racing • ITEC | Suzuki GSX-R1000 | B | (Japan) Hideyuki Ogata | 3 |
| 95 | (Japan) S-Pulse Dream Racing • ITEC | Suzuki GSX-R1000 | B | (Japan) Takuya Tsuda | 3 |
| 95 | (Japan) S-Pulse Dream Racing • ITEC | Suzuki GSX-R1000 | B | (Japan) Cocoro Atsumi | 3 |
| 96 | (France) Team Moto-Ain | Yamaha YZF-R1 | D | (France) Corentin Perolari | All |
| 96 | (France) Team Moto-Ain | Yamaha YZF-R1 | D | (Italy) Claudio Corti | All |
| 96 | (France) Team Moto-Ain | Yamaha YZF-R1 | D | (United Kingdom) Bradley Smith | 1 |
| 96 | (France) Team Moto-Ain | Yamaha YZF-R1 | D | (Spain) Isaac Vinales | 2 |
| 116 | (France) Kingtyre Fullgas Racing Team | Kawasaki Ninja ZX-10RR | K | (France) Arnaud Dejean | 1 |
| 116 | (France) Kingtyre Fullgas Racing Team | Kawasaki Ninja ZX-10RR | K | (France) Christophe Brard | 1 |
| 116 | (France) Kingtyre Fullgas Racing Team | Kawasaki Ninja ZX-10RR | K | (France) Dorian Da Re | 1 |
| 333 | (France) VRD Igol Experiences | Yamaha YZF-R1 | D | (Germany) Florian Alt | All |
| 333 | (France) VRD Igol Experiences | Yamaha YZF-R1 | D | (France) Erwan Nigon | All |
| 333 | (France) VRD Igol Experiences | Yamaha YZF-R1 | D | (South Africa) Steven Odendaal | All |

FIM Experimental teams
| No. | Team | Bike | Tyre | Riders | Rounds |
|---|---|---|---|---|---|
| 17 | (France) ITeM 17 | Kawasaki ZX-10R Excentive | B | (France) Gabriel Pons | 2 |
| 17 | (France) ITeM 17 | Kawasaki ZX-10R Excentive | B | (Italy) Jacopo Cretaro | 2 |
| 17 | (France) ITeM 17 | Kawasaki ZX-10R Excentive | B | (France) Stephane Egea | 2 |
| 45 | (France) Metiss | Metiss JBB Concept | D | (France) Gabriel Pons | 1 |
| 45 | (France) Metiss | Metiss JBB Concept | D | (France) Mathieu Charpin | 1 |
| 45 | (France) Metiss | Metiss JBB Concept | D | (Austria) Lukas Trautmann | 1 |

FIM SST teams
| No. | Team | Bike | Tyre | Riders | Rounds |
|---|---|---|---|---|---|
| 15 | (France) Aprilia Le Mans 2 Roues | Aprilia RSV4 | D | (Italy) Alex Bernardi | 1 |
| 15 | (France) Aprilia Le Mans 2 Roues | Aprilia RSV4 | D | (France) Emmanuel Parisse | 1 |
| 15 | (France) Aprilia Le Mans 2 Roues | Aprilia RSV4 | D | (France) Tanguy Zaepfel | 1 |
| 18 | (France) Team 18 Sapeurs Pompiers | Yamaha YZF-R1 | D | (France) Hugo Clere | All |
| 18 | (France) Team 18 Sapeurs Pompiers | Yamaha YZF-R1 | D | (Austria) Philipp Steinmayr | All |
| 18 | (France) Team 18 Sapeurs Pompiers | Yamaha YZF-R1 | D | (France) Baptiste Guittet | All |
| 24 | (France) BMRT 3D Maxxess Nevers | Kawasaki Ninja ZX-10RR | D | (France) Anthony Loiseau | All |
| 24 | (France) BMRT 3D Maxxess Nevers | Kawasaki Ninja ZX-10RR | D | (Belgium) Loris Cresson | All |
| 24 | (France) BMRT 3D Maxxess Nevers | Kawasaki Ninja ZX-10RR | D | (France) Loic Arbel | 1 |
| 24 | (France) BMRT 3D Maxxess Nevers | Kawasaki Ninja ZX-10RR | D | (Belgium) Vincent Lonbois | 2 |
| 33 | (France) Team 33 Louit April Moto | Kawasaki Ninja ZX-10RR | D | (Italy) Christian Gamarino | All |
| 33 | (France) Team 33 Louit April Moto | Kawasaki Ninja ZX-10RR | D | (Italy) Simone Saltarelli | All |
| 33 | (France) Team 33 Louit April Moto | Kawasaki Ninja ZX-10RR | D | (France) Stephane Egea | 1 |
| 33 | (France) Team 33 Louit April Moto | Kawasaki Ninja ZX-10RR | D | (Italy) Kevin Calia | 2 |
| 36 | (France) 3Art Best Of Bike | Yamaha YZF-R1 | D | (France) Nicolas Escudier | All |
| 36 | (France) 3Art Best Of Bike | Yamaha YZF-R1 | D | (France) Martin Renaudin | All |
| 36 | (France) 3Art Best Of Bike | Yamaha YZF-R1 | D | (France) Matthieu Lagrive | All |
| 41 | (France) RAC 41 ChromeBurner | Honda CBR1000RR-R SP | D | (Luxembourg) Chris Leesch | All |
| 41 | (France) RAC 41 ChromeBurner | Honda CBR1000RR-R SP | D | (Netherlands) Wayne Tessels | All |
| 41 | (France) RAC 41 ChromeBurner | Honda CBR1000RR-R SP | D | (France) Joseph Foray | 1 |
| 41 | (France) RAC 41 ChromeBurner | Honda CBR1000RR-R SP | D | (France) Eddy Dupuy | 2 |
| 44 | (Italy) No Limits Motor Team | Suzuki GSX-R1000 | D | (Italy) Luca Scassa | All |
| 44 | (Italy) No Limits Motor Team | Suzuki GSX-R1000 | D | (France) Alexis Masbou | All |
| 44 | (Italy) No Limits Motor Team | Suzuki GSX-R1000 | D | (Italy) Kevin Calia | 1 |
| 44 | (Italy) No Limits Motor Team | Suzuki GSX-R1000 | D | (United Kingdom) Stefan Hill | 2 |
| 55 | (France) National Motos Honda | Honda CBR1000RR-R | D | (Switzerland) Sebastien Suchet | All |
| 55 | (France) National Motos Honda | Honda CBR1000RR-R | D | (Switzerland) Valentin Suchet | All |
| 55 | (France) National Motos Honda | Honda CBR1000RR-R | D | (France) Guillaume Raymond | All |
| 56 | (France) Players | Kawasaki Ninja ZX-10RR | D | (Belgium) Arnaud de Kimpe | All |
| 56 | (France) Players | Kawasaki Ninja ZX-10RR | D | (France) Leonard Vignat | 1 |
| 56 | (France) Players | Kawasaki Ninja ZX-10RR | D | (Spain) Felix Rodriguez | 1 |
| 56 | (France) Players | Kawasaki Ninja ZX-10RR | D | (Belgium) David Drieghe | 2 |
| 56 | (France) Players | Kawasaki Ninja ZX-10RR | D | (France) Vincent Rutkowski | 2 |
| 64 | (Japan) Kawasaki Plaza Racing Team | Kawasaki Ninja ZX-10RR | B | (Japan) Ryosuke Iwato | 3 |
| 64 | (Japan) Kawasaki Plaza Racing Team | Kawasaki Ninja ZX-10RR | B | (Japan) Naoki Kiyosue | 3 |
| 64 | (Japan) Kawasaki Plaza Racing Team | Kawasaki Ninja ZX-10RR | B | (Japan) Yuta Okaya | 3 |
| 66 | (France) OG Motorsport by Sarazin | Yamaha YZF-R1 | D | (Japan) Cocoro Atsumi | All |
| 66 | (France) OG Motorsport by Sarazin | Yamaha YZF-R1 | D | (Italy) Roberto Rolfo | All |
| 66 | (France) OG Motorsport by Sarazin | Yamaha YZF-R1 | D | (France) Alex Plancassagne | 1 |
| 66 | (France) OG Motorsport by Sarazin | Yamaha YZF-R1 | D | (Portugal) Alexandre Santo Domingues | 1 |
| 83 | (France) JLD Citybike | Yamaha YZF-R1 | D | (France) Jonathan Sautif | All |
| 83 | (France) JLD Citybike | Yamaha YZF-R1 | D | (France) Florian Avazeri | 1 |
| 83 | (France) JLD Citybike | Yamaha YZF-R1 | D | (United Kingdom) Paul Carew | 1 |
| 83 | (France) JLD Citybike | Yamaha YZF-R1 | D | (Netherlands) Marcel Zuurbier | 1 |
| 83 | (France) JLD Citybike | Yamaha YZF-R1 | D | (France) Lionel Bergeron | 2 |
| 86 | (France) Pitlane Endurance 86 | Yamaha YZF-R1 | D | (Turkey) Rodi Pak | All |
| 86 | (France) Pitlane Endurance 86 | Yamaha YZF-R1 | D | (France) Maxim Pellizotti | All |
| 86 | (France) Pitlane Endurance 86 | Yamaha YZF-R1 | D | (France) Adrian Parassol | 1 |
| 86 | (France) Pitlane Endurance 86 | Yamaha YZF-R1 | D | (France) Joseph Foray | 2 |
| 91 | (France) Energie Endurance 91 | Kawasaki Ninja ZX-10RR | D | (Italy) Christian Napoli | All |
| 91 | (France) Energie Endurance 91 | Kawasaki Ninja ZX-10RR | D | (Austria) Jan Mohr | All |
| 91 | (France) Energie Endurance 91 | Kawasaki Ninja ZX-10RR | D | (Poland) Pawel Szkopek | 1 |
| 91 | (France) Energie Endurance 91 | Kawasaki Ninja ZX-10RR | D | (Bulgaria) Martin Choy | 2 |
| 94 | (France) Team LH Racing | Yamaha YZF-R1 | D | (France) Johan Nigon | All |
| 94 | (France) Team LH Racing | Yamaha YZF-R1 | D | (France) Enzo de la Vega | All |
| 94 | (France) Team LH Racing | Yamaha YZF-R1 | D | (France) Hugo Robert | 1 |
| 94 | (France) Team LH Racing | Yamaha YZF-R1 | D | (Austria) Lukas Trautmann | 2 |
| 97 | (United Kingdom) ADSS 97 | Kawasaki Ninja ZX-10RR | D | (United Kingdom) Jonathan Railton | All |
| 97 | (United Kingdom) ADSS 97 | Kawasaki Ninja ZX-10RR | D | (United Kingdom) Christopher Platt | All |
| 97 | (United Kingdom) ADSS 97 | Kawasaki Ninja ZX-10RR | D | (United Kingdom) John Blackshaw | 1 |
| 97 | (United Kingdom) ADSS 97 | Kawasaki Ninja ZX-10RR | D | (United Kingdom) James Edwards | 2 |
| 101 | (Italy) Team Aviobike | Yamaha YZF-R1 | D | (Italy) Anthony Groppi | All |
| 101 | (Italy) Team Aviobike | Yamaha YZF-R1 | D | (Austria) Patrick Dangl | All |
| 101 | (Italy) Team Aviobike | Yamaha YZF-R1 | D | (Austria) Gerold Gesslbauer | 1 |
| 101 | (Italy) Team Aviobike | Yamaha YZF-R1 | D | (Switzerland) Yves Lindegger | 1 |
| 121 | (France) Falcon Racing | Yamaha YZF-R1 | D | (Switzerland) David Chevalier | All |
| 121 | (France) Falcon Racing | Yamaha YZF-R1 | D | (France) Loïc Millet | All |
| 121 | (France) Falcon Racing | Yamaha YZF-R1 | D | (France) Théo Eisen | All |
| 777 | (Poland) Wójcik Racing Team | Yamaha YZF-R1 | D | (United Kingdom) Danny Webb | All |
| 777 | (Poland) Wójcik Racing Team | Yamaha YZF-R1 | D | (Italy) Kevin Manfredi | All |
| 777 | (Poland) Wójcik Racing Team | Yamaha YZF-R1 | D | (Poland) Marek Szkopek | All |

== Results and standings ==
=== Race results ===
| Round | Circuit | Pole position | Fastest lap | Formula EWC winners | Superstock winners | Experimental winners | Report |
|---|---|---|---|---|---|---|---|
| 1 | (France) Le Mans | (Austria) YART - Yamaha Official Team EWC | (France) (Japan) Yoshimura SERT Motul | (France) (Japan) Yoshimura SERT Motul | (France) Team 18 Sapeurs Pompiers | (France) Metiss | |
| 1 | (France) Le Mans | (Czech Republic) Karel Hanika (Germany) Marvin Fritz (Italy) Niccolò Canepa | (France) Gregg Black | (France) Gregg Black (Belgium) Xavier Siméon (France) Sylvain Guintoli | (France) Hugo Clere (France) Baptiste Guittet (Austria) Philipp Steinmayr | (France) Gabriel Pons (Portugal) Alexandre Santo-Dominques (Austria) Lukas Trautmann | |
| 2 | (Belgium) Spa | (Austria) YART - Yamaha Official Team EWC | (France) (Japan) Yoshimura SERT Motul | (Belgium) BMW Motorrad World Endurance | (France) Team LH Racing | (France) Item 17 | |
| 2 | (Belgium) Spa | (Czech Republic) Karel Hanika (Germany) Marvin Fritz (Italy) Niccolò Canepa | (France) Sylvain Guintoli | (Germany) Markus Reiterberger (Ukraine) Illia Mykhalchyk (France) Jeremy Guarnoni | (France) Johan Nigon (France) Enzo de la Vega (Austria) Lukas Trautmann | (France) Gabriel Pons (Italy) Jacopo Cretaro (France) Stephane Egea | |
| 3 | (Japan) Suzuka | (Japan) Team HRC | (Japan) Team HRC | (Japan) Team HRC | (Japan) Kawasaki Plaza Racing Team | did not Participate | |
| 3 | (Japan) Suzuka | (Japan) Takumi Takahashi (Spain) Iker Lecuona (Japan) Tetsuta Nagashima | (Japan) Tetsuta Nagashima | (Japan) Takumi Takahashi (Spain) Iker Lecuona (Japan) Tetsuta Nagashima | (Japan) Ryosuke Iwato (Japan) Yuta Okaya (Japan) Naoki Kiyosue | did not Participate | |
| 4 | (France) Le Castellet | (Belgium) BMW Motorrad World Endurance | (Belgium) BMW Motorrad World Endurance | (France) VRD Igol Experiences | (France) RAC 41 ChromeBurner | (France) Metiss | |
| 4 | (France) Le Castellet | (Germany) Markus Reiterberger (Ukraine) Illia Mykhalchyk (France) Jeremy Guarnoni | (Ukraine) Illia Mykhalchyk | (Germany) Florian Alt (France) Erwan Nigon (South Africa) Steven Odendaal | (Luxembourg) Chris Leesch (France) Wayne Tessels (France) Jonathan Hardt | (France) Gabriel Pons (France) Mathieu Charpin (France) Ludovic Rizza | |

=== Championship standings ===
Points systems

| Duration | 1st | 2nd | 3rd | 4th | 5th | 6th | 7th | 8th | 9th | 10th | 11th | 12th | 13th | 14th | 15th | 16th | 17th | 18th | 19th | 20th |
|---|---|---|---|---|---|---|---|---|---|---|---|---|---|---|---|---|---|---|---|---|
| 24 Hrs | 40 | 33 | 28 | 24 | 21 | 19 | 17 | 15 | 13 | 11 | 10 | 9 | 8 | 7 | 6 | 5 | 4 | 3 | 2 | 1 |
| 12 Hrs | 35 | 29 | 25 | 21 | 18 | 16 | 14 | 13 | 12 | 11 | 10 | 9 | 8 | 7 | 6 | 5 | 4 | 3 | 2 | 1 |
| Less than 8 Hrs | 30 | 24 | 21 | 19 | 17 | 15 | 14 | 13 | 12 | 11 | 10 | 9 | 8 | 7 | 6 | 5 | 4 | 3 | 2 | 1 |
| Finale | 60 | 49.5 | 42 | 36 | 31.5 | 28.5 | 25.5 | 22.5 | 19.5 | 16.5 | 15 | 13.5 | 12 | 10.5 | 9 | 7.5 | 6 | 4.5 | 3 | 1.5 |
| Bonus | 10 | 9 | 8 | 7 | 6 | 5 | 4 | 3 | 2 | 1 | —N/a | | | | | | | | | |
| Grid | 5 | 4 | 3 | 2 | 1 | —N/a | | | | | | | | | | | | | | |

==== FIM EWC World Championship Team Rankings ====
| Pos. | No | Team | Bike | Tyre | (France) LE MANS | | | | (Belgium) SPA | | | | (Japan) SUZUKA | | (France) BOL D'OR | | | | Points |
| Pos. | No | Team | Bike | Tyre | Grid | 8 Hrs | 16 Hrs | 24 Hrs | Grid | 8 Hrs | 16 Hrs | 24 Hrs | Grid | 8 Hrs | Grid | 8 Hrs | 16 Hrs | 24 Hrs | Points |
|---|---|---|---|---|---|---|---|---|---|---|---|---|---|---|---|---|---|---|---|
| 1 | 5 | (Japan) F.C.C. TSR Honda France | Honda CBR 1000RR-R | B | 3 | 10 | 8 | 28 | 2 | 9 | 3 | 28 | 2 | 11 | 2 | 6 | 6 | 36 | 154 |
| 2 | 1 | (France) Yoshimura SERT Motul | Suzuki GSX-R 1000R | B | 4 | 9 | 10 | 40 | 3 | 10 | 6 | 24 | | 21 | 3 | Ret | - | - | 130 |
| 3 | 333 | (France) Viltais Racing Igol | Yamaha YZF-R1 | D | | 6 | 7 | Ret | | 1 | 5 | 19 | | | | 9 | 7 | 60 | 114 |
| 4 | 4 | (France) Tati Team Beringer Racing | Kawasaki ZX-10R | MI | | 4 | 3 | 21 | | 6 | 8 | 33 | | | | 8 | 9 | 15 | 107 |
| 5 | 77 | (Poland) Wójcik Racing Team | Yamaha YZF-R1 | D | | 0 | 0 | Ret | | 5 | 7 | 21 | | | | 7 | 8 | 49.5 | 97.5 |
| 6 | 7 | (Austria) YART - Yamaha Official Team EWC | Yamaha YZF-R1 | B | 5 | 8 | 9 | 33 | 5 | 7 | 9 | Ret | 3 | 14 | 4 | Ret | - | - | 97 |
| 7 | 8 | Team Bolliger Switzerland | Kawasaki ZX-10R | MI | | 5 | 6 | 24 | | 4 | 2 | 15 | | | | 3 | 4 | 25.5 | 88.5 |
| 8 | 11 | Webike SRC Kawasaki France Trickstar | Kawasaki ZX-10R | D | | 7 | 0 | 15 | 1 | Ret | - | - | | 7 | | 1 | 5 | 42 | 78 |
| 9 | 6 | (Germany) ERC Endurance Ducati | Ducati Panigale V4 R | P | 1 | 0 | 5 | 17 | | 0 | Ret | - | | | | 10 | 10 | 31.5 | 74.5 |
| 10 | 90 | Team LRP Poland | BMW S1000RR | P | | 3 | 4 | 19 | | 2 | 1 | 13 | | | | 2 | 3 | 22.5 | 69.5 |
| 11 | 37 | (Belgium) BMW Motorrad World Endurance Team | BMW M1000RR | D | 2 | Ret | - | - | 4 | 8 | 10 | 40 | | Ret | 5 | Ret | - | - | 69 |
| 12 | 14 | (Slovakia) Maco Racing Team | Yamaha YZF-R1 | D | | 0 | 1 | 11 | | 3 | 0 | 11 | | | | 4 | 2 | 28.5 | 60.5 |
| 13 | 33 | (Japan) Team HRC | Honda CBR 1000RR-RSP | B | | | | | | | | | 5 | 30 | | | | | 35 |
| 14 | 65 | (Germany) Motobox Kremer Racing | Yamaha YZF-R1 | D | | 2 | Ret | - | | 0 | 0 | 10 | | | | 0 | 1 | 19.5 | 32.5 |
| 15 | 10 | (Japan) Kawasaki Racing Team Suzuka 8H | Kawasaki ZX-10RR | B | | | | | | | | | 4 | 24 | | | | | 28 |
| 16 | 96 | (France) Moto AIN | Yamaha YZF-R1 | D | | Ret | - | - | | 0 | 4 | 17 | | | 1 | 5 | 0 | Ret | 27 |
| 17 | 95 | (Japan) S-Pulse Dream Racing • ITEC | Suzuki GSX-R1000 | B | | | | | | | | | | 19 | | | | | 19 |
| 18 | 104 | (Japan) TOHO Racing | Honda CBR 1000RR-R | B | | | | | | | | | | 17 | | | | | 17 |
| 19 | 85 | (Japan) TONE RT SYNCEDGE 4413 BMW | BMW M1000RR | P | | | | | | | | | | | | 0 | 0 | 16.5 | 16.5 |
| 20 | 72 | (Japan) Honda Dream RT SAKURAI HONDA | Honda CBR 1000RR-R | B | | | | | | | | | | 15 | | | | | 15 |
| 20 | 30 | (France) Team GT endurance | Yamaha YZF-R1 | MI | | 0 | 2 | 13 | | | | | | | | | | | 15 |
| 22 | 40 | (Japan) Team ATJ with JAPAN POST | Honda CBR 1000RR-R | B | | | | | | | | | | 13 | | | | | 13 |
| 23 | 50 | (Japan) TEAM KODAMA | Yamaha YZF-R1 | B | | | | | | | | | | 12 | | | | | 12 |
| 24 | 88 | (Japan) Honda Asia-Dream Racing with Showa | Honda CBR 1000RR-R | B | | | | | | | | | | 10 | | | | | 10 |
| 24 | 116 | (France) Kingtyre Fullgas Racing Team | Yamaha YZF-R1 | K | | 0 | 0 | 10 | | | | | | | | | | | 10 |
| 26 | 54 | (Japan) GOSHI Racing | Honda CBR 1000RR-R | B | | | | | | | | | | 9 | | | | | 9 |
| 27 | 44 | (Japan) SANMEI Team TARO PLUSONE | BMW M1000RR | B | | | | | | | | | | 8 | | | | | 8 |
| 28 | 60 | (Japan) Honda Hamamatsu ESCARGOT RT | Honda CBR 1000RR-R | D | | | | | | | | | | 6 | | | | | 6 |
| 29 | 3 | (Japan) KRP SANYOKOGYO&RS-ITOH | Kawasaki ZX-10RR | B | | | | | | | | | | 5 | | | | | 5 |
| 30 | 99 | (Japan) ADVANCE MC & FOC CLAYMORE EDGE with DOGHOUSE | Suzuki GSXR-1000R | D | | | | | | | | | | 4 | | | | | 4 |
| 31 | 27 | (Japan) TransMapRacing with ACE CAFE | Suzuki GSXR-1000 | B | | | | | | | | | | 3 | | | | | 3 |
| 32 | 78 | (Japan) Honda Blue Helmets MSC Kumamoto & Asaka | Honda CBR 1000RR-R | D | | | | | | | | | | 2 | | | | | 2 |
| 33 | 9 | (France) Tecmas Mersen GMC | BMW S1000RR | MI | | 1 | 0 | Ret | | | | | | | | | | | 1 |
| 33 | 9 | (Japan) Murayama. Honda Dream. RT | Honda CBR 1000RR-R | B | | | | | | | | | | 1 | | | | | 1 |
| 33 | 73 | (Japan) SDG Honda Racing | Honda CBR 1000RR-R | B | | | | | | | | | 1 | NC | | | | | 1 |

| Colour | Result |
|---|---|
| Gold | Winner |
| Silver | Second place |
| Bronze | Third place |
| Green | Points classification |
| Blue | Non-points classification |
| Blue | Non-classified finish (NC) |
| Purple | Retired, not classified (Ret) |
| Red | Did not qualify (DNQ) |
| Red | Did not pre-qualify (DNPQ) |
| Black | Disqualified (DSQ) |
| White | Did not start (DNS) |
| White | Withdrew (WD) |
| White | Race cancelled (C) |
| Blank | Did not practice (DNP) |
| Blank | Did not arrive (DNA) |
| Blank | Excluded (EX) |

==== FIM EWC World Championship Manufacturer's Rankings ====
| Pos | Manufacturer | LE MANS (France) | SPA (Belgium) | SUZUKA (Japan) | BOL D'OR (France) | Points |
|---|---|---|---|---|---|---|
| 1 | (Japan) Yamaha | 46 | 40 | 26 | 110 | 221.5 |
| 2 | (Japan) Kawasaki | 45 | 48 | 31 | 67.5 | 191.5 |
| 3 | (Japan) Honda | 28 | 28 | 47 | 36 | 139 |
| 4 | (Germany) BMW | 19 | 53 | 8 | 39 | 119 |
| 5 | (Japan) Suzuki | 40 | 24 | 40 | - | 104 |
| 6 | (Italy) Ducati | 17 | - | - | 31.5 | 48.5 |
