= 2016–17 FIM Endurance World Championship =

The 2016–17 FIM Endurance World Championship was the 38th season of the FIM Endurance World Championship, a motorcycle racing series co-organised by the Fédération Internationale de Motocyclisme (FIM) and Eurosport. This season marked the first move to a winter schedule for the championship, with the season starting at the Bol d'Or in September 2016 and concluding at the Suzuka 8 Hours in July 2017. The European rounds were held during the winter to avoid conflicts with the MotoGP and Superbike schedules. GMT 94 Yamaha won their 3rd title.

== Calendar and Results ==
Round	Event	Circuit	Date	Winning team	Winning riders
1	Bol d'Or	(France) Circuit Paul Ricard	17–18 September 2016	(France) Suzuki Endurance Racing Team	(France) Vincent Philippe
1	Bol d'Or	(France) Circuit Paul Ricard	17–18 September 2016	(France) Suzuki Endurance Racing Team	(France) Anthony Delhalle
1	Bol d'Or	(France) Circuit Paul Ricard	17–18 September 2016	(France) Suzuki Endurance Racing Team	(France) Etienne Masson
2	24 Heures Moto	(France) Bugatti Circuit	15–16 April 2017	(France) GMT94 Yamaha	(France) Mike Di Meglio
2	24 Heures Moto	(France) Bugatti Circuit	15–16 April 2017	(France) GMT94 Yamaha	(Spain) David Checa
2	24 Heures Moto	(France) Bugatti Circuit	15–16 April 2017	(France) GMT94 Yamaha	(Italy) Niccolo Canepa
3	Oschersleben 8 Hours	(Germany) Motorsport Arena Oschersleben	19–20 May 2017	(France) GMT94 Yamaha	(France) Mike Di Meglio
3	Oschersleben 8 Hours	(Germany) Motorsport Arena Oschersleben	19–20 May 2017	(France) GMT94 Yamaha	(Spain) David Checa
3	Oschersleben 8 Hours	(Germany) Motorsport Arena Oschersleben	19–20 May 2017	(France) GMT94 Yamaha	(Italy) Niccolo Canepa
4	8 Hours of Slovakia Ring	Automotodróm Slovakia Ring	23–24 June 2017	(France) GMT94 Yamaha	(France) Mike Di Meglio
4	8 Hours of Slovakia Ring	Automotodróm Slovakia Ring	23–24 June 2017	(France) GMT94 Yamaha	(Spain) David Checa
4	8 Hours of Slovakia Ring	Automotodróm Slovakia Ring	23–24 June 2017	(France) GMT94 Yamaha	(Italy) Niccolo Canepa
5	Suzuka 8 Hours	(Japan) Suzuka Circuit	28–30 July 2017	(Austria) YART - Yamaha	(Japan) Katsuyuki Nakasuga
5	Suzuka 8 Hours	(Japan) Suzuka Circuit	28–30 July 2017	(Austria) YART - Yamaha	(United Kingdom) Alex Lowes
5	Suzuka 8 Hours	(Japan) Suzuka Circuit	28–30 July 2017	(Austria) YART - Yamaha	(Netherlands) Michael van der Mark

== Championship Standings ==
=== Teams FIM EWC Championship ===
(top-15 teams out of 54 ranked)

Pos.	Team	BOL (France)	LMS (France)	OSC (Germany)	SVK (Slovakia)	SUZ (Japan)	Total points
1	(France) GMT94 Yamaha	13	58	30	30	15	146
2	(France) Suzuki Endurance Racing Team	60	36	12	24	6	138
3	(Austria) YART - Yamaha	9	53	24	19	25,5	130,5
4	(Japan) F.C.C. TSR Honda France	32	35	17	0	31,5	115,5
5	(France) Team SRC Kawasaki	50	42				92
6	(Slovakia) Maco Racing Team	37	17	21	12		87
7	(France) Yamaha Viltaïs Experience	13	25	13	15		66
8	(France) Moto Ain CRT	26	22	15	2		65
9	(France) Tati Team Beaujolais Racing	20	27	10	8		65
10	(Japan) EVA RT Webike Trick Star	44	9	Ret	1	10,5	64,5
11	Bolliger Team Switzerland	8	2	19	13	12	54
12	(Japan) Yamaha Factory Racing Team					45	45
13	(United Kingdom) Honda Endurance Racing	Ret	10	11	21		42
14	(Germany) Voelpker NRT48 Schubert-Motors by ERC	11	Ret	14	17		42
15	(Japan) Kawasaki Team Green					36	36

=== Riders Championship ===
(top-10 of 182 drivers)

Pos.	Rider	Team	BOL (France)	LMS (France)	OSC (Germany)	SVK (Slovakia)	SUZ (Japan)	Total points
1	(Italy) Niccolò Canepa	(France) GMT94 Yamaha	13	58	30	30	15	146
1	(Spain) David Checa	(France) GMT94 Yamaha	13	58	30	30	15	146
3	(France) Etienne Masson	(France) Suzuki Endurance Racing Team	60	36	12	24	6	138
3	(France) Vincent Philippe	(France) Suzuki Endurance Racing Team	60	36	12	24	6	138
5	(France) Mike di Meglio	(France) GMT94 Yamaha		58	30	30	15	133
6	(Australia) Broc Parkes	(Austria) YART - Yamaha	9	53	24	19	25,5	130,5
7	(France) Randy De Puniet	(France) Team SRC Kawasaki	50	42			31,5	123,5
8	(Japan) Kohta Nozane	(Austria) YART - Yamaha		53	24	19	25,5	121,5
9	(Germany) Marvin Fritz	(Austria) YART - Yamaha		53	24	19	25,5	121,5
10	(France) Fabien Foret	(France) Team SRC Kawasaki	50	42				92

=== Manufacturers FIM EWC Championship ===
Pos.	Manufacturer	BOL (France)	LMS (France)	OSC (Germany)	SVK (Slovakia)	SUZ (Japan)	Total points
1	(Japan) Yamaha	43	73	54	49	70,5	289,5
2	(Japan) Kawasaki	61	47	29	23	48	208
3	(Japan) Suzuki	48	29	18	35	39	169
4	(Japan) Honda	26	31	28	21	59	165
5	(Germany) BMW	11	0	22	31	1,5	65,5
5	(Italy) Ducati			1			1
