= 2021 FIM Endurance World Championship =

42nd season of the FIM Endurance World Championship (EWC)

The 2021 FIM Endurance World Championship (FIM EWC) was the 42nd season of the FIM Endurance World Championship, a motorcycle racing series co-organised by the Fédération Internationale de Motocyclisme (FIM) and Eurosport Events.

== Calendar ==
The 2021 championship was scheduled to consists of 5 races in Europe and Asia.
The calendar was released on 29 December 2020. On 17 March 2021; the calendar was updated and the races of 12 Hours of Estoril and Suzuka 8 Hours swapped their places in response to the COVID-19 pandemic. Therefore, the season began on the 17 April with the 24 Hours Moto in France, and was scheduled to end on the 7 November with the Suzuka 8 Hours in Japan.

Rnd	Race	Circuit	Location	Date
1	24 Heures Motos	(France) Bugatti Circuit	Le Mans, France	12–13 June
2	12 Hours of Estoril	(Portugal) Autodromo do Estoril	Cascais, Portugal	17 July (Note: The 12 Hours of Estoril was originally due to take place on 16 October 2021. It was rescheduled to 17 July by swapping the places with Suzuka 8 Hours in response to the COVID-19 pandemic.)
3	Bol d'Or	(France) Circuit Paul Ricard	Le Castellet, Var, France	18–19 September
4	6 Hours of Most	(Czech Republic) Autodrom Most	Most, Czech Rep.	9 October
Cancelled
	8 Hours of Oschersleben	(Germany) Motorsport Arena Oschersleben	Saxony-Anhalt, Germany	13 May (Note: The 8 Hours of Oschersleben was originally due to take place on 13 May 2021. It was cancelled in response to the COVID-19 pandemic.)
	Suzuka 8 Hours	(Japan) Suzuka International Racing Course	Suzuka, Mie Japan	7 November (Note: The Suzuka 8 Hours was originally due to take place on 18 July 2021. It was postponed to 7 November 2021 by in response to the COVID-19 pandemic. The race was later cancelled.)

=== Calendar Changes ===
- After being cancelled due to the COVID-19 pandemic, the 8 Hours of Oschersleben, Suzuka 8 Hours and the Bol d'Or all returned to the calendar.
- The 8 Hours of Sepang was dropped from the calendar.
- On 17 March 2021; 12 Hours of Estoril and Suzuka 8 Hours swapped their places in response to the COVID-19 pandemic. The Suzuka 8 Hours was later cancelled.
- Also due to COVID-19, 24 Hours Moto and 8 Hours of Oschersleben were first delayed.
- The race at Autodrom Most was then added following the cancellation of the Oschersleben and Suzuka eight-hour races. Originally an eight-hour race, the event, part of the FIA WTCC Race of the Czech Republic (which is also promoted by Eurosport) schedule, it was reduced to six hours because of restrictions at the event.

== Teams and riders ==
=== FIM EWC Teams ===
No.	Team	Bike	Tyre	Riders	Rounds
1	(France) Yoshimura SERT Motul	Suzuki GSX-R 1000R	B	(France) Gregg Black	All
1	(France) Yoshimura SERT Motul	Suzuki GSX-R 1000R	B	(Belgium) Xavier Siméon	All
1	(France) Yoshimura SERT Motul	Suzuki GSX-R 1000R	B	(France) Sylvain Guintoli	All
4	(France) Tati Team Beringer Racing	Kawasaki ZX-10R	M	(France) Alan Techer	1, 3
4	(France) Tati Team Beringer Racing	Kawasaki ZX-10R	M	(France) Sébastien Suchet	All
4	(France) Tati Team Beringer Racing	Kawasaki ZX-10R	M	(France) Julien Enjolras	1
4	(France) Tati Team Beringer Racing	Kawasaki ZX-10R	M	(France) Morgan Berchet	2-3
4	(France) Tati Team Beringer Racing	Kawasaki ZX-10R	M	(France) Valentin Suchet	2, 4
4	(France) Tati Team Beringer Racing	Kawasaki ZX-10R	M	(France) Enzo Boulom	4
5	(Japan) F.C.C. TSR Honda France	Honda CBR 1000 SP	B	(Australia) Joshua Hook	All
5	(Japan) F.C.C. TSR Honda France	Honda CBR 1000 SP	B	(Japan) Yuki Takahashi	All
5	(Japan) F.C.C. TSR Honda France	Honda CBR 1000 SP	B	(France) Mike Di Meglio	All
6	(Germany) Team ERC Endurance	Ducati Panigale V4 R	M	(France) Mathieu Gines	All
6	(Germany) Team ERC Endurance	Ducati Panigale V4 R	M	(France) Louis Rossi	1-2
6	(Germany) Team ERC Endurance	Ducati Panigale V4 R	M	(France) Etienne Masson	All
6	(Germany) Team ERC Endurance	Ducati Panigale V4 R	M	(Italy) Lorenzo Zanetti	3-4
7	(Austria) YART - Yamaha Official Team EWC	Yamaha YZF-R1	B	(Czech Republic) Karel Hanika	All
7	(Austria) YART - Yamaha Official Team EWC	Yamaha YZF-R1	B	(Germany) Marvin Fritz	All
7	(Austria) YART - Yamaha Official Team EWC	Yamaha YZF-R1	B	(Italy) Niccolò Canepa	All
8	Team Bolliger Switzerland #8	Kawasaki ZX-10R	M	(Germany) Jan Bühn	All
8	Team Bolliger Switzerland #8	Kawasaki ZX-10R	M	(Sweden) Jesper Pellijeff	All
8	Team Bolliger Switzerland #8	Kawasaki ZX-10R	M	(Czech Republic) Ondřej Ježek	1
8	Team Bolliger Switzerland #8	Kawasaki ZX-10R	M	(Switzerland) Marcel Brenner	2
8	Team Bolliger Switzerland #8	Kawasaki ZX-10R	M	(Switzerland) Nico Thöni	3
8	Team Bolliger Switzerland #8	Kawasaki ZX-10R	M	(Netherlands) Nigel Walraven	4
9	(France) Tecmas BMW	BMW S1000RR	M	(France) Camille Hedelin	3
9	(France) Tecmas BMW	BMW S1000RR	M	(France) Dylan Buisson	3
9	(France) Tecmas BMW	BMW S1000RR	M	(France) Maxime Bonnot	3
11	Webike SRC Kawasaki France	Kawasaki ZX-10R	D	(France) Jeremy Guarnoni	All
11	Webike SRC Kawasaki France	Kawasaki ZX-10R	D	(France) Erwan Nigon	All
11	Webike SRC Kawasaki France	Kawasaki ZX-10R	D	(Spain) David Checa	All
14	(Slovakia) MACO Racing Team	Yamaha YZF-R1	D	(France) Gregory Leblanc	1
14	(Slovakia) MACO Racing Team	Yamaha YZF-R1	D	(France) Enzo Boulom	1
14	(Slovakia) MACO Racing Team	Yamaha YZF-R1	D	(France) Charles Diller	1
14	(Slovakia) MACO Racing Team	Yamaha YZF-R1	D	(Australia) Anthony West	3-4
14	(Slovakia) MACO Racing Team	Yamaha YZF-R1	D	(Czech Republic) Ondřej Ježek	3-4
14	(Slovakia) MACO Racing Team	Yamaha YZF-R1	D	(Germany) Marc Moser	3
30	(France) GT Endurance	Yamaha YZF-R1	M	(France) Camille Lageon	1
30	(France) GT Endurance	Yamaha YZF-R1	M	(France) Karl Croix	1
30	(France) GT Endurance	Yamaha YZF-R1	M	(France) Paul Dufour	1
36	(France) 3ART Best of Bike	Yamaha YZF-R1	M	(France) Nicolas Escudier	1-2
36	(France) 3ART Best of Bike	Yamaha YZF-R1	M	(France) Matthieu Lagrive	1
36	(France) 3ART Best of Bike	Yamaha YZF-R1	M	(France) Morgan Berchet	1
36	(France) 3ART Best of Bike	Yamaha YZF-R1	M	(France) Martin Renaudin	2
36	(France) 3ART Best of Bike	Yamaha YZF-R1	M	(France) Ludovic Rizza	2
37	(Belgium) BMW Motorrad World Endurance Team	BMW S1000RR	D	(Germany) Markus Reiterberger	All
37	(Belgium) BMW Motorrad World Endurance Team	BMW S1000RR	D	(Ukraine) Illia Mykhalchyk	1,3-4
37	(Belgium) BMW Motorrad World Endurance Team	BMW S1000RR	D	(Spain) Javier Fores	1-2
37	(Belgium) BMW Motorrad World Endurance Team	BMW S1000RR	D	(France) Kenny Foray	2-4
65	(Germany) Motobox Kremer Racing #65	Yamaha YZF-R1	D	(France) Geoffroy Dehaye	All
65	(Germany) Motobox Kremer Racing #65	Yamaha YZF-R1	D	(Germany) Stefan Ströhlein	1-2, 4
65	(Germany) Motobox Kremer Racing #65	Yamaha YZF-R1	D	(France) Benjamin Colliaux	1, 3
65	(Germany) Motobox Kremer Racing #65	Yamaha YZF-R1	D	(France) Kevin Jacob	2
65	(Germany) Motobox Kremer Racing #65	Yamaha YZF-R1	D	(Austria) Lukas Walchhütter	3-4
77	(Poland) Wójcik Racing Team	Yamaha YZF-R1	D	(France) Sylvain Barrier	1
77	(Poland) Wójcik Racing Team	Yamaha YZF-R1	D	(Hungary) Balint Kovacs	1
77	(Poland) Wójcik Racing Team	Yamaha YZF-R1	D	(Poland) Artur Wielebski	1
77	(Poland) Wójcik Racing Team	Yamaha YZF-R1	D	(United Kingdom) Gino Rea	2-4
77	(Poland) Wójcik Racing Team	Yamaha YZF-R1	D	(Republic of Ireland) Michael Laverty	2
77	(Poland) Wójcik Racing Team	Yamaha YZF-R1	D	(Czech Republic) Michal Filla	2
77	(Poland) Wójcik Racing Team	Yamaha YZF-R1	D	(South Africa) Sheridan Morais	3-4
77	(Poland) Wójcik Racing Team	Yamaha YZF-R1	D	(United Kingdom) Dan Linfoot	3-4
90	Team LRP Poland	BMW S1000RR	P	(France) Dominik Vincon	1, 4
90	Team LRP Poland	BMW S1000RR	P	(Poland) Kamil Krzemien	1, 3-4
90	Team LRP Poland	BMW S1000RR	P	(Poland) Bartolomiej Lewandowski	1, 4
90	Team LRP Poland	BMW S1000RR	P	(Netherlands) Nigel Walraven	2
90	Team LRP Poland	BMW S1000RR	P	(Austria) Stefan Kerschbaumer	2-3
90	Team LRP Poland	BMW S1000RR	P	(Austria) Thomas Gradinger	2
90	Team LRP Poland	BMW S1000RR	P	(Germany) Julian Puffe	2
96	(France) Moto AIN	Yamaha YZF-R1	D	(France) Randy De Puniet	All
96	(France) Moto AIN	Yamaha YZF-R1	D	(Italy) Roberto Rolfo	1-3
96	(France) Moto AIN	Yamaha YZF-R1	D	(Switzerland) Robin Mulhauser	1-3
96	(France) Moto AIN	Yamaha YZF-R1	D	(France) Loris Baz	4
96	(France) Moto AIN	Yamaha YZF-R1	D	(France) Corentin Perolari	4
98	EMRT Endurance Monaco Racing Team	Yamaha YZF-R1	D	(France) Reynald Castillon	3
98	EMRT Endurance Monaco Racing Team	Yamaha YZF-R1	D	(France) Bruno Weber	3
98	EMRT Endurance Monaco Racing Team	Yamaha YZF-R1	D	(France) Hugo Robert	3
333	(France) VRD Igol Experiences	Yamaha YZF-R1	D	(Germany) Florian Alt	All
333	(France) VRD Igol Experiences	Yamaha YZF-R1	D	(France) Florian Marino	1-3
333	(France) VRD Igol Experiences	Yamaha YZF-R1	D	(Spain) Nicolas Terol	1-3

== Results and standings ==
=== Race results ===
Round	Circuit	Pole position	Fastest lap	Formula EWC winners	Superstock winners	Experimental winners	Report
1	(France) Le Mans	(Austria) YART - Yamaha Official Team EWC	(France) Tati Team Beringer Racing	(France) (Japan) Yoshimura SERT Motul	(France) Honda National Motos	(France) Metiss JBB	
1	(France) Le Mans	(Czech Republic) Karel Hanika (Germany) Marvin Fritz (Italy) Niccolò Canepa	(France) Alan Techer	(France) Gregg Black (Belgium) Xavier Siméon (France) Sylvain Guintoli	(France) Guillaume Antiga (France) Stéphane Egea (Switzerland) Kévin Trueb	(France) Gabriel Pons (France) Ludovic Rizza (France) Mathieu Charpin	
2	(Portugal) Estoril	(Austria) YART - Yamaha Official Team EWC	(France) (Japan) Yoshimura SERT Motul	(France) F.C.C. TSR Honda	(France) BMRT 3D Maxxess Nevers	No Entries	
2	(Portugal) Estoril	(Czech Republic) Karel Hanika (Germany) Marvin Fritz (Italy) Niccolò Canepa	(France) Sylvain Guintoli	(Australia) Joshua Hook (Japan) Yuki Takahashi (France) Mike Di Meglio	(France) Jonathan Hardt (France) Julien Pilot (Belgium) Loris Cresson	No Entries	
3	(France) Le Castellet	(France) (Japan) Yoshimura SERT Motul	(France) Tati Team Beringer Racing	(France) (Japan) Yoshimura SERT Motul	(France) BMRT 3D Maxxess Nevers	(France) Metiss JBB	
3	(France) Le Castellet	(France) Gregg Black (Belgium) Xavier Siméon (France) Sylvain Guintoli	(France) Alan Techer	(France) Gregg Black (Belgium) Xavier Siméon (France) Sylvain Guintoli	(France) Anthony Loiseau (France) Jonathan Hardt (France) Julien Pilot	(France) Mathieu Charpin (Switzerland) Kevin Trueb (Turkey) Asrin Rodi Pak	
4	(Czech Republic) Most	(Austria) YART - Yamaha Official Team EWC	(Austria) YART - Yamaha Official Team EWC	(Belgium) BMW Motorrad World Endurance Team	(Italy) No Limits Motor Team	No Entries	
4	(Czech Republic) Most	(Czech Republic) Karel Hanika (Germany) Marvin Fritz (Italy) Niccolò Canepa	(Germany) Marvin Fritz	(Ukraine) Illia Mykhalchyk (Germany) Markus Reiterberger (France) Kenny Foray	(Italy) Luca Scassa (France) Alexis Masbou (Italy) Kevin Calia	No Entries	

=== Championship standings ===
Points systems

Rounds	1st	2nd	3rd	4th	5th	6th	7th	8th	9th	10th	11th	12th	13th	14th	15th	16th	17th	18th	19th	20th
24 Hrs	40	33	28	24	21	19	17	15	13	11	10	9	8	7	6	5	4	3	2	1
12 Hrs	35	29	25	21	18	16	14	13	12	11	10	9	8	7	6	5	4	3	2	1
6 Hrs Finale	45	36	31.5	28.5	25.5	22.5	21	19.5	18	16.5	15	13.5	12	10.5	9	7.5	6	4.5	3	1.5

- According to FIM regulations, the points allocated for the final round was promoted by 150%.

Bonus Points	1st	2nd	3rd	4th	5th	6th	7th	8th	9th	10th
All Rounds	10	9	8	7	6	5	4	3	2	1

- The Top 10 teams after 8h and 16h of race received bonus points.

Starting Grid	1st	2nd	3rd	4th	5th
All Rounds	5	4	3	2	1

- In each race, the top 5 teams on starting grid received bonus points.

==== FIM EWC World Championship Team Rankings ====
Pos.	No	Team	Bike	Tyre	(France) LE MANS				(Portugal) ESTORIL			(France) BOL D'OR				(Czech Republic) MOST		Points
Pos.	No	Team	Bike	Tyre	Grid	8 Hrs	16 Hrs	24 Hrs	Grid	8 Hrs	12 Hrs	Grid	8 Hrs	16 Hrs	24 Hrs	Grid	6 Hrs	Points
1	1	(France) Yoshimura SERT Motul	Suzuki GSX-R 1000R	B	4	10	10	40	3	0	9	5	10	10	40	3	31,5	175,5
2	37	(Belgium) BMW Motorrad World Endurance Team	BMW S1000RR	D	3	6	7	28	4	7	25	3	1	Ret	-	4	45	133
3	11	Webike SRC Kawasaki France	Kawasaki ZX-10R	D		7	8	33		10	29		Ret	-	-		28,5	115,5
4	333	(France) VRD Igol Experiences	Yamaha YZF-R1	D	1	1	6	24		8	21	1	7	8	28		Ret	105
5	5	(Japan) F.C.C. TSR Honda France	Honda CBR 1000 SP	B		8	9	19	2	9	35	2	5	Ret	-	2	Ret	91
6	7	(Austria) YART - Yamaha Official Team EWC	Yamaha YZF-R1	B	5	9	Ret	-	5	0	13	4	9	2	Ret	5	36	88
7	96	(France) Moto AIN	Yamaha YZF-R1	D		Ret	-	-		6	18		6	9	33		13,5	85,5
8	65	(Germany) Motobox Kremer Racing #65	Yamaha YZF-R1	D		4	4	15		0	8		2	7	24		21	85
9	6	(Germany) Team ERC Endurance	Ducati Panigale V4 R	M		5	3	21		4	16		8	Ret	-		22,5	79,5
10	14	(Slovakia) MACO Racing Team	Yamaha YZF-R1	D		2	5	17					3	6	21		16,5	70,5
11	77	(Poland) Wójcik Racing Team	Yamaha YZF-R1	D		0	1	11		3	12		4	Ret	-	1	26,5	57,5
12	4	(France) Tati Team Beringer Racing	Kawasaki ZX-10R	M	2	0	Ret	-	1	1	Ret		0	5	17		19,5	45,5
13	90	Team LRP Poland	BMW S1000RR	P		Ret	-	-		0	10		0	4	15		15	44
14	8	Team Bolliger Switzerland#8	Kawasaki ZX-10R	M		0	0	0		5	14		Ret	-	-		18	37
15	98	EMRT Endurance Monaco Racing Team	Yamaha YZF-R1	D									0	3	19			22
16	30	(France) GT endurance	Yamaha YZF-R1	M		3	2	13										18
17	36	(France) 3ART Best of Bike	Yamaha YZF-R1	M		Ret	-	-		2	11							13
18	9	(France) Tecmas BMW	BMW S1000RR	M									Ret	-	-			0

Colour	Result
Gold	Winner
Silver	Second place
Bronze	Third place
Green	Points classification
Blue	Non-points classification
Blue	Non-classified finish (NC)
Purple	Retired, not classified (Ret)
Red	Did not qualify (DNQ)
Red	Did not pre-qualify (DNPQ)
Black	Disqualified (DSQ)
White	Did not start (DNS)
White	Withdrew (WD)
White	Race cancelled (C)
Blank	Did not practice (DNP)
Blank	Did not arrive (DNA)
Blank	Excluded (EX)

==== FIM EWC World Championship Manufacturer's Rankings ====
Pos	Manufacturer	LMS (France)	EST (Portugal)	LEC (France)	MOS (Czech Republic)	Points
1	(Japan) Yamaha	41	39	61	61.5	202.5
2	(Japan) Kawasaki	33	43	17	48	141
3	(Germany) BMW	28	35	15	60	138
4	(Japan) Suzuki	40	9	40	31.5	120.5
5	(Italy) Ducati	21	16	0	22.5	59.5
6	(Japan) Honda	19	35	0	0	54
