= 2023 Japanese motorcycle Grand Prix =

Motorcycle races in Motegi

(Japan) 2023 Japanese Grand Prix
Race details
- Race 14 of 20 races in the 2023 Grand Prix motorcycle racing season
- Date: 1 October 2023
- Official name: Motul Grand Prix of Japan
- Location: Mobility Resort Motegi; Motegi, Japan
- Course: Permanent racing facility; 4.801 km (2.983 mi)

MotoGP
Pole position
Rider	(Spain) Jorge Martín	Ducati
Time	1:43.198	
Fastest lap
Rider	(France) Johann Zarco	Ducati
Time	1:55.903 on lap 3	
Podium
First	(Spain) Jorge Martín	Ducati
Second	(Italy) Francesco Bagnaia	Ducati
Third	(Spain) Marc Márquez	Honda

Moto2
Pole position
Rider	(Thailand) Somkiat Chantra	Kalex
Time	1:49.898	
Fastest lap
Rider	(Thailand) Somkiat Chantra	Kalex
Time	1:50.679 on lap 3	
Podium
First	(Thailand) Somkiat Chantra	Kalex
Second	(Japan) Ai Ogura	Kalex
Third	(Spain) Pedro Acosta	Kalex

Moto3
Pole position
Rider	(Spain) Jaume Masià	Honda
Time	1:56.331	
Fastest lap
Rider	(Japan) Ayumu Sasaki	Husqvarna
Time	1:57.064 on lap 3	
Podium
First	(Spain) Jaume Masià	Honda
Second	(Japan) Ayumu Sasaki	Husqvarna
Third	(Spain) Daniel Holgado	KTM

The 2023 Japanese motorcycle Grand Prix (officially known as the Motul Grand Prix of Japan) was the fourteenth round of the 2023 Grand Prix motorcycle racing season. It was held at the Mobility Resort Motegi in Motegi on 1 October 2023.

After Somkiat Chantra's win in the Moto2 class, Kalex secured its eleventh straight Constructors' Championship.

== Practice ==
=== MotoGP ===
==== Combined Free Practice 1-2 ====
Free Practice sessions on Friday and Saturday do not determine riders to qualify for Q2.

Fastest session lap

Pos.	No.	Biker	Constructor	Free practice times	
Pos.	No.	Biker	Constructor	FP1	FP2
1	72	(Italy) Marco Bezzecchi	Ducati	1:45.510	**1:44.622**
2	1	(Italy) Francesco Bagnaia	Ducati	1:45.631	**1:44.989**
3	43	(Australia) Jack Miller	KTM	1:45.902	**1:45.007**
4	49	(Italy) Fabio Di Giannantonio	Ducati	1:46.160	**1:45.021**
5	33	(South Africa) Brad Binder	KTM	1:45.747	**1:45.058**
6	93	(Spain) Marc Márquez	Honda	1:46.033	**1:45.089**
7	89	(Spain) Jorge Martín	Ducati	1:45.192	**1:45.148**
8	41	(Spain) Aleix Espargaró	Aprilia	1:46.229	**1:45.160**
9	25	(Spain) Raúl Fernández	Aprilia	1:45.966	**1:45.185**
10	12	(Spain) Maverick Viñales	Aprilia	1:45.819	**1:45.186**
11	88	(Portugal) Miguel Oliveira	Aprilia	1:46.198	**1:45.202**
12	21	(Italy) Franco Morbidelli	Yamaha	1:46.027	**1:45.245**
13	37	(Spain) Augusto Fernández	KTM	1:45.330	**1:45.318**
14	20	(France) Fabio Quartararo	Yamaha	1:45.952	**1:45.335**
15	5	(France) Johann Zarco	Ducati	1:46.018	**1:45.343**
16	44	(Spain) Pol Espargaró	KTM	1:46.181	**1:45.537**
17	36	(Spain) Joan Mir	Honda	**1:45.685**	1:45.862
18	30	(Japan) Takaaki Nakagami	Honda	1:46.334	**1:46.009**
19	6	(Germany) Stefan Bradl	Honda		**1:46.287**
20	35	(United Kingdom) Cal Crutchlow	Yamaha	**1:46.302**	1:46.490
21	51	(Italy) Michele Pirro	Ducati	1:47.132	**1:46.617**
22	42	(Spain) Álex Rins	Honda	**1:47.587**	
OFFICIAL MOTOGP COMBINED FREE PRACTICE TIMES REPORT

==== Practice session ====
The top ten riders (written in bold) qualified for Q2.

Pos.	No.	Biker	Constructor	
Pos.	No.	Biker	Constructor	Time results
1	33	**(South Africa) Brad Binder**	**KTM**	**1:43.489**
2	1	**(Italy) Francesco Bagnaia**	**Ducati**	**1:43.518**
3	41	**(Spain) Aleix Espargaró**	**Aprilia**	**1:43.784**
4	89	**(Spain) Jorge Martín**	**Ducati**	**1:43.843**
5	72	**(Italy) Marco Bezzecchi**	**Ducati**	**1:43.945**
6	49	**(Italy) Fabio Di Giannantonio**	**Ducati**	**1:43.947**
7	5	**(France) Johann Zarco**	**Ducati**	**1:44.062**
8	12	**(Spain) Maverick Viñales**	**Aprilia**	**1:44.117**
9	44	**(Spain) Pol Espargaró**	**KTM**	**1:44.219**
10	43	**(Australia) Jack Miller**	**KTM**	**1:44.261**
11	88	(Portugal) Miguel Oliveira	Aprilia	1:44.317
12	36	(Spain) Joan Mir	Honda	1:44.428
13	20	(France) Fabio Quartararo	Yamaha	1:44.520
14	93	(Spain) Marc Márquez	Honda	1:44.574
15	21	(Italy) Franco Morbidelli	Yamaha	1:44.657
16	35	(United Kingdom) Cal Crutchlow	Yamaha	1:44.709
17	25	(Spain) Raúl Fernández	Aprilia	1:44.811
18	30	(Japan) Takaaki Nakagami	Honda	1:44.928
19	37	(Spain) Augusto Fernández	KTM	1:45.231
20	51	(Italy) Michele Pirro	Ducati	1:45.866
21	42	(Spain) Álex Rins	Honda	1:47.236
OFFICIAL MOTOGP PRACTICE TIMES REPORT

=== Moto2 ===
==== Combined Practice 1-2-3 ====
The top fourteen riders (written in bold) qualified for Q2.

Fastest session lap

Pos.	No.	Biker	Constructor	Free practice times		
Pos.	No.	Biker	Constructor	P1	P2	P3
1	35	**(Thailand) Somkiat Chantra**	**Kalex**	1:50.477	1:50.396	**1:49.978**
2	79	**(Japan) Ai Ogura**	**Kalex**	1:51.226	1:50.804	**1:50.255**
3	37	**(Spain) Pedro Acosta**	**Kalex**	1:50.617	1:50.646	**1:50.382**
4	40	**(Spain) Arón Canet**	**Kalex**	1:51.368	**1:50.433**	1:51.020
5	22	**(United Kingdom) Sam Lowes**	**Kalex**	1:51.682	1:50.546	**1:50.486**
6	54	**(Spain) Fermín Aldeguer**	**Boscoscuro**	1:51.295	1:51.563	**1:50.586**
7	16	**(United States) Joe Roberts**	**Kalex**	1:51.382	1:51.095	**1:50.628**
8	42	**(Spain) Marcos Ramírez**	**Kalex**	1:51.888	1:50.818	**1:50.646**
9	14	**(Italy)** **Tony Arbolino**	**Kalex**	1:51.414	1:51.678	**1:50.676**
10	18	**(Spain) Manuel González**	**Kalex**	1:51.013	1:51.044	**1:50.730**
11	11	**(Spain) Sergio García**	**Kalex**	1:51.926	1:52.227	**1:50.739**
12	71	**(Italy) Dennis Foggia**	**Kalex**	1:52.005	1:51.025	**1:50.849**
13	7	**(Belgium) Barry Baltus**	**Kalex**	1:51.671	1:51.362	**1:50.894**
14	12	**(Czech Republic) Filip Salač**	**Kalex**	**1:50.925**	1:51.712	1:50.926
15	64	(Netherlands) Bo Bendsneyder	Kalex	1:51.531	1:51.358	**1:50.943**
16	96	(United Kingdom) Jake Dixon	Kalex	1:51.221	1:51.399	**1:50.997**
17	28	(Spain) Izan Guevara	Kalex	1:51.251	**1:51.064**	1:51.650
18	75	(Spain) Albert Arenas	Kalex	1:51.567	1:51.082	**1:51.076**
19	21	(Spain) Alonso López	Boscoscuro	1:51.619	1:51.237	**1:51.183**
20	84	(Netherlands) Zonta van den Goorbergh	Kalex	1:51.926	1:51.636	**1:51.201**
21	52	(Spain) Jeremy Alcoba	Kalex	1:51.810	1:51.604	**1:51.281**
22	15	(South Africa) Darryn Binder	Kalex	**1:51.422**	1:51.632	1:51.673
23	23	(Japan) Taiga Hada	Kalex	1:51.773	1:51.769	**1:51.468**
24	5	(Japan) Kohta Nozane	Kalex	1:52.676	1:51.711	**1:51.544**
25	33	(United Kingdom) Rory Skinner	Kalex	1:53.312	1:52.434	**1:51.891**
26	4	(United States) Sean Dylan Kelly	Forward	1:52.647	1:52.411	**1:51.992**
27	67	(Italy) Alberto Surra	Forward	1:52.472	**1:52.018**	1:53.107
28	9	(Italy) Mattia Casadei	Kalex	1:54.490	1:53.029	**1:52.404**
29	72	(Spain) Borja Gómez	Kalex	1:52.825	1:52.672	**1:52.417**
30	8	(Australia) Senna Agius	Kalex	1:53.121	1:53.339	**1:52.709**
Source : OFFICIAL MOTO2 COMBINED PRACTICE TIMES REPORT

=== Moto3 ===
==== Combined Practice 1-2-3 ====
The top fourteen riders (written in bold) qualified for Q2.

Fastest session lap

Pos.	No.	Biker	Constructor	Practice times		
Pos.	No.	Biker	Constructor	P1	P2	P3
1	5	(Spain) **Jaume Masià**	**Honda**	1:57.495	1:57.068	**1:56.148**
2	96	**(Spain) Daniel Holgado**	**KTM**	1:57.756	1:57.226	**1:56.632**
3	53	**(Turkey) Deniz Öncü**	**KTM**	1:58.111	1:57.277	**1:56.660**
4	10	(Brazil) **Diogo Moreira**	**KTM**	1:57.260	1:58.722	**1:56.661**
5	6	**(Japan) Ryusei Yamanaka**	**Gas Gas**	1:57.915	1:57.524	**1:56.813**
6	71	(Japan) **Ayumu Sasaki**	**Husqvarna**	1:57.735	1:57.191	1:56.900
7	44	**(Spain)** **David Muñoz**	**KTM**	1:57.466	1:57.775	**1:56.942**
8	80	**(Colombia) David Alonso**	**Gas Gas**	1:57.773	1:57.672	**1:57.007**
9	27	**(Japan) Kaito Toba**	**Honda**	1:58.787	1:57.384	**1:57.028**
10	82	**(Italy) Stefano Nepa**	**KTM**	1:57.745	1:57.311	**1:57.131**
11	24	(Japan) **Tatsuki Suzuki**	**Honda**	1:58.323	1:57.676	**1:57.156**
12	18	**(Italy) Matteo Bertelle**	**Honda**	1:58.056	1:58.503	**1:57.171**
13	82	**(Italy) Iván Ortolá**	**KTM**	1:58.144	**1:57.176**	1:57.187
14	95	**(Netherlands)** **Collin Veijer**	**Husqvarna**	1:59.074	1:57.747	**1:57.250**
15	66	(Australia) Joel Kelso	CFMoto	1:58.612	1:58.065	**1:57.252**
16	72	(Japan) Taiyo Furusato	Honda	1:58.700	1:57.591	**1:57.315**
17	99	(Spain) José Antonio Rueda	KTM	1:58.736	1:57.473	**1:57.350**
18	54	(Italy) Riccardo Rossi	Honda	1:58.485	1:57.742	**1:57.532**
19	19	(United Kingdom) Scott Ogden	Honda	1:59.432	1:58.169	**1:57.784**
20	92	(Spain) David Almansa	Honda	1:58.681	**1:57.812**	1:58.354
21	63	(Malaysia) Syarifuddin Azman	KTM	1:58.803	1:58.094	**1:57.843**
22	7	(Italy) Filippo Farioli	KTM	1:58.548	1:58.499	**1:58.030**
23	64	(Indonesia) Mario Aji	Honda	2:00.017	1:59.131	**1:58.179**
24	43	(Spain) Xavier Artigas	CFMoto	1:58.530	1:58.470	**1:58.765**
25	20	(France) Lorenzo Fellon	KTM	1:59.481	1:59.659	**1:58.765**
26	70	(United Kingdom) Joshua Whatley	Honda	1:59.394	1:59.171	**1:58.944**
27	22	(Spain) Ana Carrasco	KTM	1:59.841	1:59.267	**1:59.016**
Source : OFFICIAL MOTO3 COMBINED PRACTICE TIMES REPORT

== Qualifying ==
=== MotoGP ===
Fastest session lap

Pos.	No.	Biker	Constructor	Qualifying times		Final grid	Row
Pos.	No.	Biker	Constructor	Q1	Q2	Final grid	Row
1	89	(Spain) Jorge Martín	Ducati	Qualified in Q2	1:43.198	1	1
2	1	(Italy) Francesco Bagnaia	Ducati	Qualified in Q2	1:43.369	2	1
3	43	(Australia) Jack Miller	KTM	Qualified in Q2	1:43.551	3	1
4	72	(Italy) Marco Bezzecchi	Ducati	Qualified in Q2	1:43.624	4	2
5	33	(South Africa) Brad Binder	KTM	Qualified in Q2	1:43.709	5	2
6	49	(Italy) Fabio Di Giannantonio	Ducati	Qualified in Q2	1:43.808	6	2
7	93	(Spain) Marc Márquez	Honda	1:43.997	1:43.812	7	3
8	12	(Spain) Maverick Viñales	Aprilia	Qualified in Q2	1:43.815	8	3
9	41	(Spain) Aleix Espargaró	Aprilia	Qualified in Q2	1:43.822	9	3
10	5	(France) Johann Zarco	Ducati	Qualified in Q2	1:43.851	10	4
11	25	(Spain) Raúl Fernández	Aprilia	1:44.049	1:44.054	11	4
12	44	(Spain) Pol Espargaró	KTM	Qualified in Q2	1:44.096	12	4
13	37	(Spain) Augusto Fernández	KTM	1:44.129	N/A	13	5
14	20	(France) Fabio Quartararo	Yamaha	1:44.138	N/A	14	5
15	36	(Spain) Joan Mir	Honda	1:44.150	N/A	15	5
16	88	(Portugal) Miguel Oliveira	Aprilia	1:44.427	N/A	16	6
17	21	(Italy) Franco Morbidelli	Yamaha	1:44.521	N/A	17	6
18	30	(Japan) Takaaki Nakagami	Honda	1:44.626	N/A	18	6
19	35	(United Kingdom) Cal Crutchlow	Yamaha	1:45.273	N/A	19	7
20	6	(Germany) Stefan Bradl	Honda	1:45.451	N/A	20	7
21	51	(Italy) Michele Pirro	Ducati	1:45.707	N/A	21	7
OFFICIAL MOTOGP QUALIFYING RESULTS

== MotoGP Sprint ==
The MotoGP Sprint was held on 30 September.

Pos.	No.	Rider	Team	Constructor	Laps	Time/Retired	Grid	Points
1	89	(Spain) Jorge Martín	Prima Pramac Racing	Ducati	12	21:00.734	1	12
2	33	(South Africa) Brad Binder	Red Bull KTM Factory Racing	KTM	12	+1.390	5	9
3	1	(Italy) Francesco Bagnaia	Ducati Lenovo Team	Ducati	12	+5.279	2	7
4	43	(Australia) Jack Miller	Red Bull KTM Factory Racing	KTM	12	+6.194	3	6
5	5	(France) Johann Zarco	Prima Pramac Racing	Ducati	12	+6.315	10	5
6	72	(Italy) Marco Bezzecchi	Mooney VR46 Racing Team	Ducati	12	+8.919	4	4
7	93	(Spain) Marc Márquez	Repsol Honda Team	Honda	12	+9.298	7	3
8	49	(Italy) Fabio Di Giannantonio	Gresini Racing MotoGP	Ducati	12	+10.189	6	2
9	12	(Spain) Maverick Viñales	Aprilia Racing	Aprilia	12	+12.404	8	1
10	25	(Spain) Raúl Fernández	CryptoData RNF MotoGP Team	Aprilia	12	+15.366	11	
11	44	(Spain) Pol Espargaró	GasGas Factory Racing Tech3	KTM	12	+15.473	12	
12	37	(Spain) Augusto Fernández	GasGas Factory Racing Tech3	KTM	12	+15.592	13	
13	36	(Spain) Joan Mir	Repsol Honda Team	Honda	12	+17.052	15	
14	88	(Portugal) Miguel Oliveira	CryptoData RNF MotoGP Team	Aprilia	12	+18.092	16	
15	20	(France) Fabio Quartararo	Monster Energy Yamaha MotoGP	Yamaha	12	+19.333	14	
16	21	(Italy) Franco Morbidelli	Monster Energy Yamaha MotoGP	Yamaha	12	+19.645	17	
17	30	(Japan) Takaaki Nakagami	LCR Honda Idemitsu	Honda	12	+21.862	18	
18	35	(United Kingdom) Cal Crutchlow	Yamalube RS4GP Racing Team	Yamaha	12	+26.026	19	
19	51	(Italy) Michele Pirro	Ducati Lenovo Team	Ducati	12	+27.911	21	
20	6	(Germany) Stefan Bradl	LCR Honda Castrol	Honda	12	+28.178	20	
Ret	41	(Spain) Aleix Espargaró	Aprilia Racing	Aprilia	8	Cylinder bank	9	
WD	42	(Spain) Álex Rins	LCR Honda Castrol	Honda		Withdrew		
Fastest sprint lap: (Spain) Jorge Martín (Ducati) – 1:44.033 (lap 2)
OFFICIAL MOTOGP SPRINT REPORT

- Álex Rins competed during the Friday practice sessions, but withdrew from the race citing right leg pain. He was replaced by Stefan Bradl for the rest of the weekend.

== Warm up practice ==
=== MotoGP ===
Jack Miller set the best time 1:46.047 and was the fastest rider at this session ahead of Marc Márquez and Fabio Quartararo.

== Race ==
=== MotoGP ===
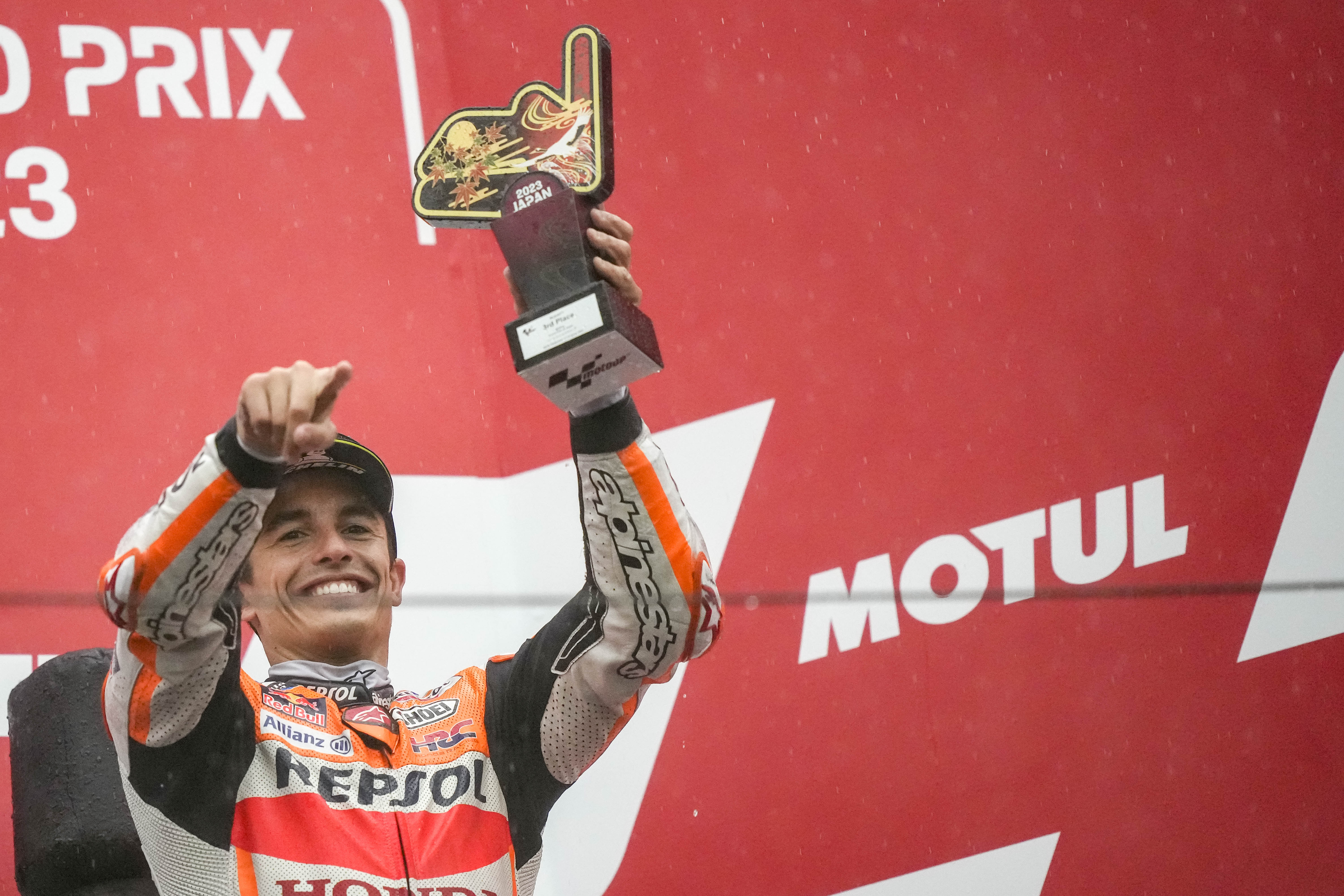
Marc Márquez with his third place trophy.

The race, scheduled to be run for 24 laps, was red-flagged during lap 13 due to adverse weather conditions on the track. The race was supposed to be restarted over the remaining 12 full laps with the grid based on the classification after lap 12. However, the race was again red-flagged during the warm-up lap of the second race, and race direction decided not to start the race again. Per regulations, full points were awarded since 50% or more of the original race distance (i.e. 12 full laps) were completed.

Pos.	No.	Rider	Team	Constructor	Laps	Time/Retired	Grid	Points
1	89	(Spain) Jorge Martín	Prima Pramac Racing	Ducati	12	24:06.314	1	25
2	1	(Italy) Francesco Bagnaia	Ducati Lenovo Team	Ducati	12	+1.413	2	20
3	93	(Spain) Marc Márquez	Repsol Honda Team	Honda	12	+2.013	7	16
4	72	(Italy) Marco Bezzecchi	Mooney VR46 Racing Team	Ducati	12	+2.943	4	13
5	41	(Spain) Aleix Espargaró	Aprilia Racing	Aprilia	12	+3.181	9	11
6	43	(Australia) Jack Miller	Red Bull KTM Factory Racing	KTM	12	+6.837	3	10
7	37	(Spain) Augusto Fernández	GasGas Factory Racing Tech3	KTM	12	+7.587	13	9
8	49	(Italy) Fabio Di Giannantonio	Gresini Racing MotoGP	Ducati	12	+8.602	6	8
9	25	(Spain) Raúl Fernández	CryptoData RNF MotoGP Team	Aprilia	12	+11.229	11	7
10	20	(France) Fabio Quartararo	Monster Energy Yamaha MotoGP	Yamaha	12	+12.244	14	6
11	30	(Japan) Takaaki Nakagami	LCR Honda Idemitsu	Honda	12	+14.714	18	5
12	36	(Spain) Joan Mir	Repsol Honda Team	Honda	12	+14.924	15	4
13	35	(United Kingdom) Cal Crutchlow	Yamalube RS4GP Racing Team	Yamaha	12	+16.057	19	3
14	6	(Germany) Stefan Bradl	LCR Honda Castrol	Honda	12	+17.253	20	2
15	44	(Spain) Pol Espargaró	GasGas Factory Racing Tech3	KTM	12	+24.921	12	1
16	51	(Italy) Michele Pirro	Ducati Lenovo Team	Ducati	12	+33.962	21	
17	21	(Italy) Franco Morbidelli	Monster Energy Yamaha MotoGP	Yamaha	12	+1:14.934	17	
18	88	(Portugal) Miguel Oliveira	CryptoData RNF MotoGP Team	Aprilia	11	+1 lap	16	
19	12	(Spain) Maverick Viñales	Aprilia Racing	Aprilia	11	+1 lap	8	
NC	5	(France) Johann Zarco	Prima Pramac Racing	Ducati	12	+6.191 / Accident	10	
Ret	33	(South Africa) Brad Binder	Red Bull KTM Factory Racing	KTM	5	Accident	5	
WD	42	(Spain) Álex Rins	LCR Honda Castrol	Honda		Withdrew		
Fastest lap: (France) Johann Zarco (Ducati) – 1:55.903 (lap 3)
OFFICIAL MOTOGP RACE REPORT

- Johann Zarco crashed out during lap 13, but was able to return to the pits when the race was red-flagged. However, he was deemed ineligible to restart the race for returning to the pits in an improper manner (i.e. using a shortcut). Thus, he was not classified for the final results despite finishing sixth in lap 12 (the lap where the final results were based).

=== Moto2 ===
Pos.	No.	Rider	Constructor	Laps	Time/Retired	Grid	Points
1	35	(Thailand) Somkiat Chantra	Kalex	19	35:19.273	1	25
2	79	(Japan) Ai Ogura	Kalex	19	+1.353	2	20
3	37	(Spain) Pedro Acosta	Kalex	19	+3.080	4	16
4	96	(United Kingdom) Jake Dixon	Kalex	19	+5.065	3	13
5	12	(Czech Republic) Filip Salač	Kalex	19	+10.492	5	11
6	18	(Spain) Manuel González	Kalex	19	+12.961	10	10
7	24	(Spain) Marcos Ramírez	Kalex	19	+14.352	12	9
8	40	(Spain) Arón Canet	Kalex	19	+16.360	7	8
9	84	(Netherlands) Zonta van den Goorbergh	Kalex	19	+17.692	15	7
10	15	(South Africa) Darryn Binder	Kalex	19	+19.405	18	6
11	14	(Italy) Tony Arbolino	Kalex	19	+20.661	13	5
12	16	(United States) Joe Roberts	Kalex	19	+20.809	11	4
13	21	(Spain) Alonso López	Boscoscuro	19	+21.303	6	3
14	28	(Spain) Izan Guevara	Kalex	19	+21.477	19	2
15	7	(Belgium) Barry Baltus	Kalex	19	+24.032	17	1
16	52	(Spain) Jeremy Alcoba	Kalex	19	+25.623	23	
17	64	(Netherlands) Bo Bendsneyder	Kalex	19	+26.803	21	
18	75	(Spain) Albert Arenas	Kalex	19	+27.371	20	
19	23	(Japan) Taiga Hada	Kalex	19	+29.412	24	
20	67	(Italy) Alberto Surra	Forward	19	+33.825	28	
21	8	(Australia) Senna Agius	Kalex	19	+34.103	29	
22	54	(Spain) Fermín Aldeguer	Boscoscuro	19	+34.291	9	
23	4	(United States) Sean Dylan Kelly	Forward	19	+36.473	25	
24	72	(Spain) Borja Gómez	Kalex	19	+39.635	26	
25	33	(United Kingdom) Rory Skinner	Kalex	19	+43.069	27	
26	9	(Italy) Mattia Casadei	Kalex	19	+45.508	30	
Ret	11	(Spain) Sergio García	Kalex	9	Accident	14	
Ret	71	(Italy) Dennis Foggia	Kalex	8	Accident	16	
Ret	5	(Japan) Kohta Nozane	Kalex	7	Accident	22	
Ret	22	(United Kingdom) Sam Lowes	Kalex	6	Accident	8	
Fastest lap: (Thailand) Somkiat Chantra (Kalex) – 1:50.679 (lap 3)
OFFICIAL MOTO2 RACE REPORT

=== Moto3 ===
Pos.	No.	Rider	Constructor	Laps	Time/Retired	Grid	Points
1	5	(Spain) Jaume Masià	Honda	17	33:30.018	1	25
2	71	(Japan) Ayumu Sasaki	Husqvarna	17	+1.546	7	20
3	96	(Spain) Daniel Holgado	KTM	17	+1.602	6	16
4	82	(Italy) Stefano Nepa	KTM	17	+5.200	4	13
5	48	(Spain) Iván Ortolá	KTM	17	+5.230	5	11
6	44	(Spain) David Muñoz	KTM	17	+8.900	8	10
7	11	(Colombia) David Alonso	Gas Gas	17	+8.959	9	9
8	27	(Japan) Kaito Toba	Honda	17	+9.253	11	8
9	6	(Japan) Ryusei Yamanaka	Gas Gas	17	+9.629	12	7
10	99	(Spain) José Antonio Rueda	KTM	17	+9.734	15	6
11	95	(Netherlands) Collin Veijer	Husqvarna	17	+9.804	10 (Note: Three-place grid penalty.)	5
12	72	(Japan) Taiyo Furusato	Honda	17	+10.195	13	4
13	54	(Italy) Riccardo Rossi	Honda	17	+10.874	17	3
14	10	(Brazil) Diogo Moreira	KTM	17	+11.577	14	2
15	66	(Australia) Joel Kelso	CFMoto	17	+13.905	18	1
16	7	(Italy) Filippo Farioli	KTM	17	+16.674	22	
17	92	(Spain) David Almansa	Honda	17	+31.109	20	
18	19	(United Kingdom) Scott Ogden	Honda	17	+31.282	21	
19	63	(Malaysia) Syarifuddin Azman	KTM	17	+31.478	23	
20	70	(United Kingdom) Joshua Whatley	Honda	17	+31.551	27	
21	20	(France) Lorenzo Fellon	KTM	17	+31.587	26	
22	22	(Spain) Ana Carrasco	KTM	17	+32.969	25	
23	64	(Indonesia) Mario Aji	Honda	17	+38.000	24	
Ret	24	(Japan) Tatsuki Suzuki	Honda	13	Accident damage	16	
Ret	53	(Turkey) Deniz Öncü	KTM	10	Accident damage	2	
Ret	18	(Italy) Matteo Bertelle	Honda	10	Accident	3	
Ret	43	(Spain) Xavier Artigas	CFMoto	9	Accident	19	
Fastest lap: (Japan) Ayumu Sasaki (Husqvarna) – 1:57.064 (lap 3)
OFFICIAL MOTO3 RACE REPORT

== Championship standings after the race ==
Below are the standings for the top five riders, constructors, and teams after the round.

=== MotoGP ===
Riders' Championship standings

Pos.	Rider	Points
1	(Italy) Francesco Bagnaia	319
2	(Spain) Jorge Martín	316
3	(Italy) Marco Bezzecchi	265
4	(South Africa) Brad Binder	201
5	(Spain) Aleix Espargaró	171

Constructors' Championship standings

	Pos.	Constructor	Points
	1	(Italy) Ducati	490
	2	(Austria) KTM	272
	3	(Italy) Aprilia	240
1	4	(Japan) Honda	142
1	5	(Japan) Yamaha	131

Teams' Championship standings

Pos.	Team	Points
1	(Italy) Prima Pramac Racing	478
2	(Italy) Mooney VR46 Racing Team	400
3	(Italy) Ducati Lenovo Team	354
4	(Austria) Red Bull KTM Factory Racing	326
5	(Italy) Aprilia Racing	310

=== Moto2 ===
Riders' Championship standings

Pos.	Rider	Points
1	(Spain) Pedro Acosta	252
2	(Italy) Tony Arbolino	202
3	(United Kingdom) Jake Dixon	159
4	(Spain) Arón Canet	124
5	(Spain) Alonso López	119

Constructors' Championship standings

Pos.	Constructor	Points
1	(Germany) Kalex	345
2	(Italy) Boscoscuro	162
3	(Switzerland) Forward	1

Teams' Championship standings

	Pos.	Team	Points
	1	(Finland) Red Bull KTM Ajo	313
	2	(Belgium) Elf Marc VDS Racing Team	276
2	3	(Japan) Idemitsu Honda Team Asia	209
1	4	(Italy) Beta Tools Speed Up	207
1	5	(Spain) Pons Wegow Los40	200

=== Moto3 ===
Riders' Championship standings

	Pos.	Rider	Points
1	1	(Spain) Jaume Masià	199
1	2	(Japan) Ayumu Sasaki	193
2	3	(Spain) Daniel Holgado	190
	4	(Colombia) David Alonso	160
	5	(Turkey) Deniz Öncü	147

Constructors' Championship standings

Pos.	Constructor	Points
1	(Austria) KTM	288
2	(Japan) Honda	240
3	(Sweden) Husqvarna	198
4	(Spain) Gas Gas	177
5	(China) CFMoto	71

Teams' Championship standings

	Pos.	Team	Points
1	1	(Germany) Liqui Moly Husqvarna Intact GP	256
1	2	(Luxembourg) Leopard Racing	249
2	3	(Finland) Red Bull KTM Ajo	247
	4	(Italy) Angeluss MTA Team	235
	5	(Spain) Gaviota GasGas Aspar Team	222

== Notes ==
Previous race: 2023 Indian Grand Prix	FIM Grand Prix World Championship; 2023 season	Next race: 2023 Indonesian Grand Prix
Previous race: 2022 Japanese Grand Prix	Japanese motorcycle Grand Prix	Next race: 2024 Japanese Grand Prix
