= Kohta Nozane =

Japanese motorcycle racer

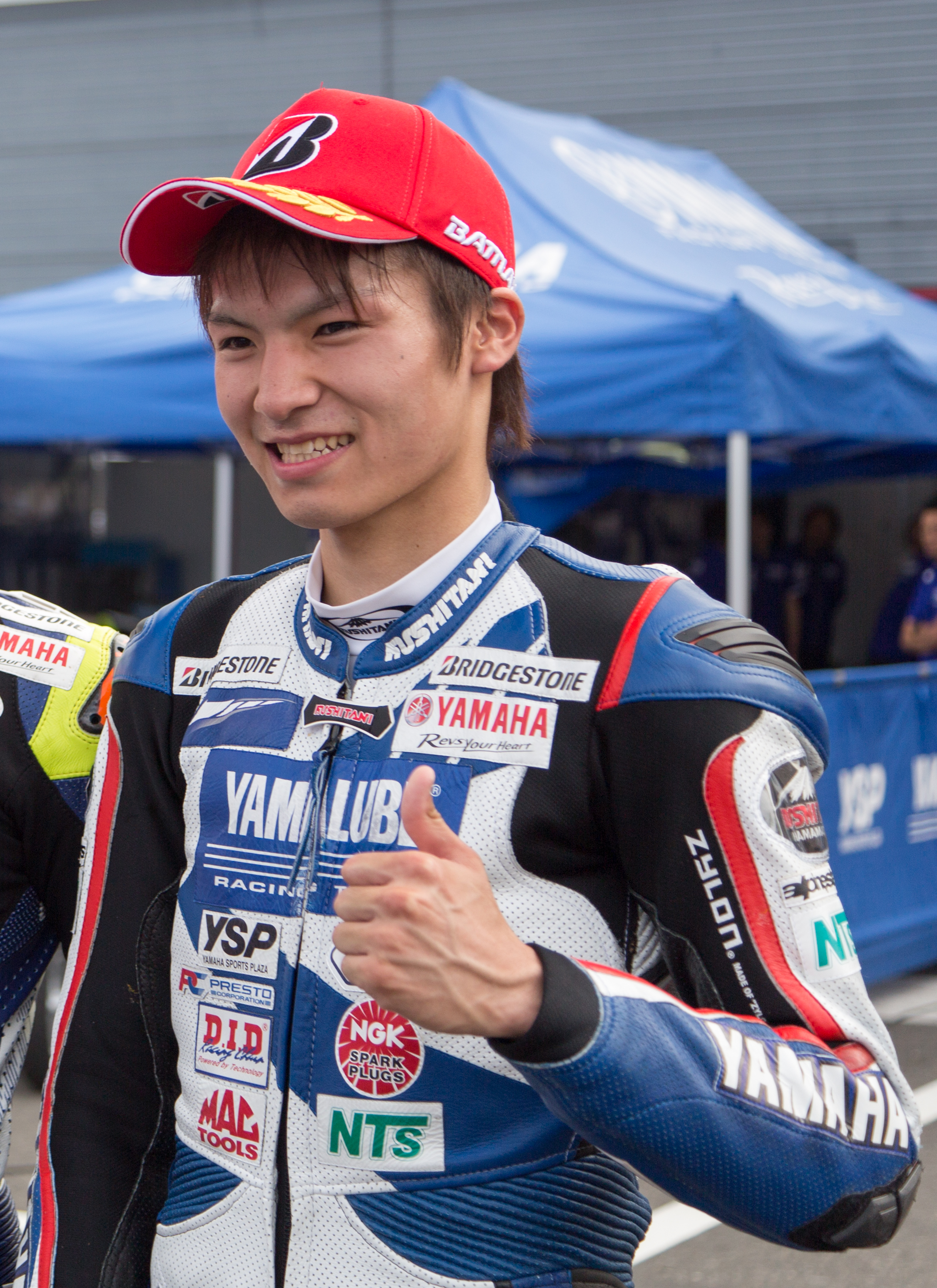
- Nozane in 2016
- Nationality: Japanese
- Born: 29 October 1995 (age 31); Chiba, Japan
- Current team: Astemo Pro Honda SI Racing
- Bike number: 4
Motorcycle racing career statistics
MotoGP World Championship
Active years	2017
Manufacturers	Yamaha
Championships	0
2017 championship position	NC (0 pts)
Starts / Wins / Podiums / Poles / F. laps / Points; 1 / 0 / 0 / 0 / 0 / 0
Moto2 World Championship
Active years	2012–2013, 2023
Manufacturers	FTR, Motobi, TSR, Kalex
Championships	0
2013 championship position	NC (0 pts)
Starts / Wins / Podiums / Poles / F. laps / Points; 15 / 0 / 0 / 0 / 0 / 0
Superbike World Championship
Active years	2021–2022
Manufacturers	Yamaha
Championships	0
2022 championship position	20th (15 pts)
Starts / Wins / Podiums / Poles / F. laps / Points; 71 / 0 / 0 / 0 / 0 / 79

Kohta Nozane (Japanese: 野左根 航汰, Hepburn: Nozane Kōta; born 29 October 1995) is a Japanese Grand Prix motorcycle racer who competes in the JSB1000 class of the All Japan Road Race Championship for Astemo Pro Honda SI Racing, aboard a Honda CBR1000RR-R.

Nozane was the All Japan J-GP2 champion in 2013 and the JSB1000 champion in 2020. He has competed full-time in the Superbike World Championship in 2021 and 2022, as well as in the Moto2 World Championship in 2023.

== Career ==
=== Moto2 World Championship ===
==== Correos Prepago Yamaha VR46 (2023) ====
Nozane competed in the Moto2 World Championship in 2023 with Correos Prepago Yamaha VR46.

== Career statistics ==
=== Grand Prix motorcycle racing ===
==== By season ====
Season	Class	Motorcycle	Team	Race	Win	Podium	Pole	FLap	Pts	Plcd
2012	Moto2	FTR	SAG Team	1	0	0	0	0	0	NC
2013	Moto2	Motobi	JiR Moto2	2	0	0	0	0	0	NC
2013	Moto2	TSR	Webike Team Norick NTS	1	0	0	0	0	0	NC
2017	MotoGP	Yamaha	Monster Yamaha Tech 3	1	0	0	0	0	0	NC
2023	Moto2	Kalex	Correos Prepago Yamaha VR46	12	0	0	0	0	0	31st
Total				**17**	**0**	**0**	**0**	**0**	**0**	

==== Races by year ====
(key) (Races in bold indicate pole position, races in italics indicate fastest lap)

Year	Class	Bike	1	2	3	4	5	6	7	8	9	10	11	12	13	14	15	16	17	18	19	20	Pos	Pts
2012	Moto2	FTR	QAT	SPA	POR	FRA	CAT	GBR	NED	GER	ITA	INP	CZE	RSM	ARA	JPN; DSQ	MAL	AUS	VAL				NC	0
2013	Moto2	Motobi	QAT	AME	SPA	FRA	ITA	CAT	NED	GER	INP	CZE	GBR	RSM	ARA	MAL	AUS; 17		VAL; Ret				NC	0
2013	Moto2	TSR																JPN; 16					NC	0
2017	MotoGP	Yamaha	QAT	ARG	AME	SPA	FRA	ITA	CAT	NED	GER	CZE	AUT	GBR	RSM	ARA	JPN; Ret	AUS	MAL	VAL			NC	0
2023	Moto2	Kalex	POR; DNS	ARG	AME	SPA	FRA	ITA	GER	NED	GBR; 22	AUT; 20	CAT; 24	RSM; 21	IND; Ret	JPN; Ret	INA; Ret	AUS; 16	THA; 22	MAL; Ret	QAT; Ret	VAL; Ret	31st	0

=== Superbike World Championship ===
==== Races by year ====
(key) (Races in bold indicate pole position, races in italics indicate fastest lap)

Year	Bike	1			2			3			4			5			6			7			8			9			10			11			12			13			Pos	Pts
Year	Bike	R1	SR	R2	R1	SR	R2	R1	SR	R2	R1	SR	R2	R1	SR	R2	R1	SR	R2	R1	SR	R2	R1	SR	R2	R1	SR	R2	R1	SR	R2	R1	SR	R2	R1	SR	R2	R1	SR	R2	Pos	Pts
2021	Yamaha	SPA; 14	SPA; 9	SPA; 12	POR; 15	POR; 15	POR; 13	ITA; 13	ITA; 12	ITA; 13	GBR; WD	GBR; WD	GBR; WD	NED; Ret	NED; 15	NED; 12	CZE; 14	CZE; 15	CZE; 14	SPA; 11	SPA; 11	SPA; Ret	FRA; 17	FRA; 16	FRA; 14	SPA; 11	SPA; Ret	SPA; 10	SPA; 13	SPA; C	SPA; Ret	POR; 14	POR; Ret	POR; 13	ARG; 15	ARG; 14	ARG; 14	INA; 15	INA; C	INA; 7	14th	64
2022	Yamaha	SPA; 18	SPA; 18	SPA; Ret	NED; 17	NED; 14	NED; Ret	POR; 14	POR; 11	POR; 13	ITA; 12	ITA; Ret	ITA; 16	GBR; 19	GBR; 17	GBR; 18	CZE; 18	CZE; 16	CZE; 13	FRA; 17	FRA; 16	FRA; 15	SPA; 16	SPA; 13	SPA; 15	POR; 15	POR; 20	POR; 20	ARG; 21	ARG; 16	ARG; 16	INA; 15	INA; 20	INA; Ret	AUS; Ret	AUS; 17	AUS; 16				20th	15

=== FIM Endurance World Championship ===
==== By team ====
Year	Team	Bike	Rider	TC
2016	Yamaha Austria Racing Team	Yamaha YZF-R1	(Australia) Broc Parkes (Germany) Max Neukirchner (Spain) Iván Silva (Germany) Marvin Fritz (Japan) Kohta Nozane (Japan) Takuya Fujita (South Africa) Sheridan Morais	6th
2016–17	Yamaha Austria Racing Team	Yamaha YZF-R1	(Australia) Broc Parkes (Spain) Iván Silva (Germany) Marvin Fritz (Japan) Kohta Nozane	3rd
2017	Yamaha Austria Racing Team	Yamaha YZF-R1	(United States) Josh Hayes (Australia) Broc Parkes (Spain) Iván Silva (Japan) Kohta Nozane (South Africa) Sheridan Morais	3rd
2017–18	Yamaha Austria Racing Team	Yamaha YZF-R1	(Germany) Marvin Fritz (Germany) Max Neukirchner (Australia) Broc Parkes (Japan) Takuya Fujita (Japan) Kohta Nozane	16th

=== Suzuka 8 Hours ===
Year	Class	Team	Co-riders	Bike	Pos
2025	**EWC**	(Japan) Astemo Pro Honda SI Racing	(Japan) Kohta Arakawa (Japan) Ryusei Yamanaka	Honda CBR1000RR-R	Ret
2026	**EWC**	(Japan) Astemo Pro Honda SI Racing	(Japan) Taiga Hada (Japan) Kohta Arakawa	Honda CBR1000RR-R	20th

=== All Japan Road Race Championship ===
==== Races by year ====
(key) (Races in bold indicate pole position; races in italics indicate fastest lap)

Year	Class	Bike	1	2	3	4	5	6	7	8	9	10	11	Pos	Pts
2024	JSB1000	Honda	SUZ; 7	MOT1; 4	MOT2; 5	SUG1; 4	SUG2; 4	MOT; 4	AUT1; 4	AUT2; 4	OKA; 4	SUZ1; 4	SUZ2; 2	4th	150
2025	JSB1000	Honda	MOT; Ret	SUG1; 2	SUG2; Ret	**MOT1**; 5	MOT2; 17	AUT1; 2	AUT2; 2	OKA; 2	SUZ1; 5	SUZ2; 3		4th	124
2026	JSB1000	Honda	MOT; 4	SUG1; 3	SUG2; 4	AUT1; 4	AUT2; 4	MOT1; 2	MOT2; 9	**OKA**; Ret	SUZ1; 12	SUZ2; 10		5th	111
