= Marvin Fritz =

German motorcycle racer (born 1993)

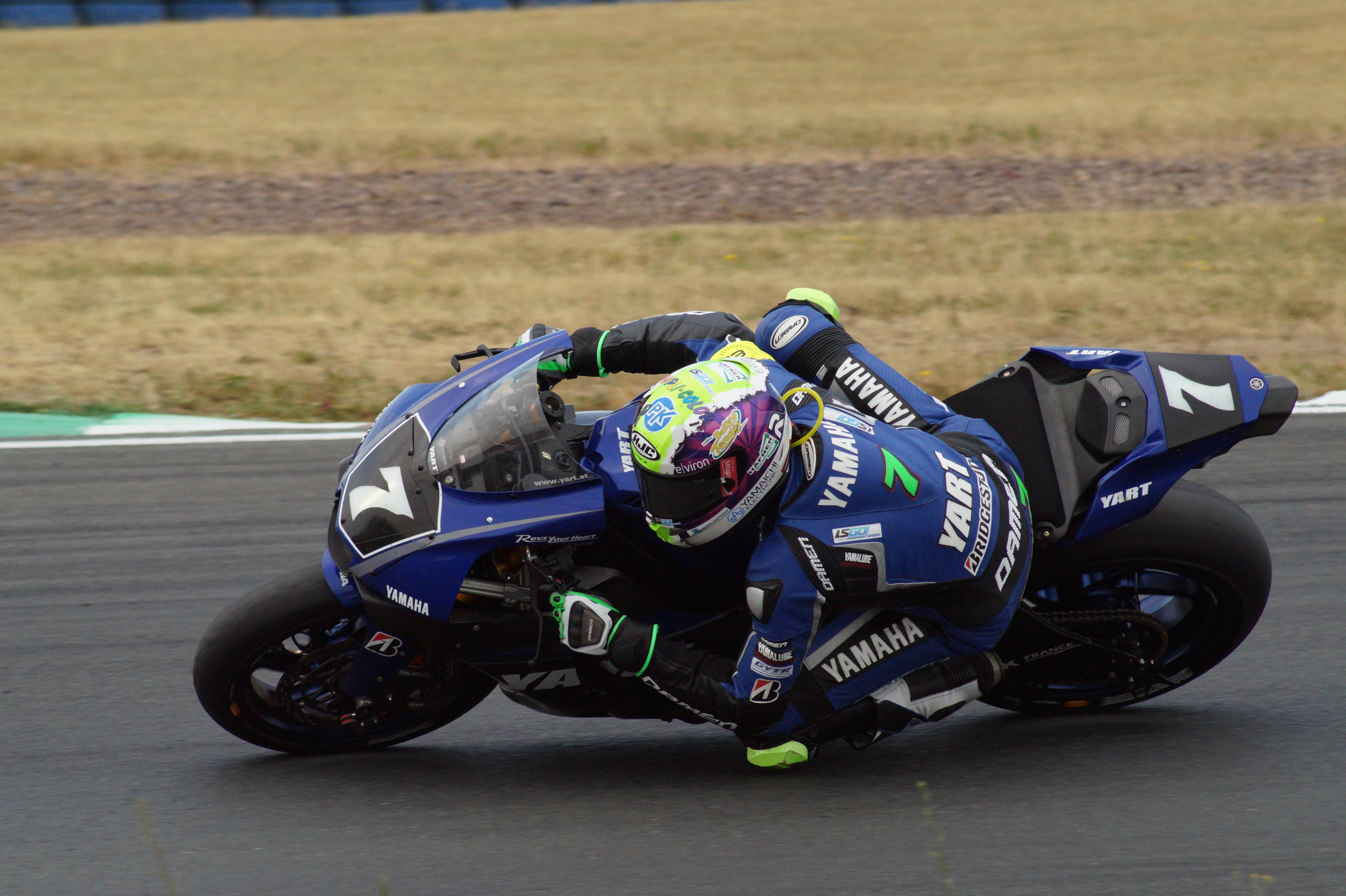
- Nationality: German
- Born: 20 April 1993 (age 33); Mosbach, Germany
- Current team: YART Yamaha
- Bike number: 7
Motorcycle racing career statistics
125cc World Championship
Active years	2008–2011
Manufacturers	Seel, Honda
Starts / Wins / Podiums / Poles / F. laps / Points; 4 / 0 / 0 / 0 / 0 / 2
Superbike World Championship
Active years	2021–2022, 2024
Manufacturers	Yamaha
Championships	0
2024 championship position	30th (0 pts)
Starts / Wins / Podiums / Poles / F. laps / Points; 17 / 0 / 0 / 0 / 0 / 0

Marvin Fritz (born 20 April 1993) is a German motorcycle racer. He competes in the Endurance FIM World Championship aboard a Yamaha YZF-R1. He won the 2005 ADAC Junior Cup, the 2014 IDM Supersport Championship aboard a Yamaha YZF-R6 and the 2016 IDM Superbike Championship aboard a Yamaha YZF-R1.

Fritz debuted in World superbikes at Most during August 2021, where the YART team had previously tested, finishing the season with six points.

== Career statistics ==
=== Career highlights ===
2011 - NC, European Superstock 600 Championship, Kawasaki ZX-6R
2017 - 15th, European Superstock 1000 Championship, Yamaha YZF-R1

=== Grand Prix motorcycle racing ===
==== By season ====
Season	Class	Motorcycle	Team	Race	Win	Podium	Pole	FLap	Pts	Plcd
2008	125cc	Seel	Kiefer Bos Sotin Jnr. Team	1	0	0	0	0	0	NC
2009	125cc	Honda	LHF-Project Racing	1	0	0	0	0	2	31st
2010	125cc	Honda	LHF Project Racing	1	0	0	0	0	0	NC
2011	125cc	Honda	LHF Project Racing	1	0	0	0	0	0	NC
Total				**4**	**0**	**0**	**0**	**0**	**2**	

==== Races by year ====
Year	Class	Bike	1	2	3	4	5	6	7	8	9	10	11	12	13	14	15	16	17	Pos.	Points
2008	125cc	Seel	QAT	SPA	POR	CHN	FRA	ITA	CAT	GBR	NED	GER; 19	CZE	RSM	INP	JPN	AUS	MAL	VAL	NC	0
2009	125cc	Honda	QAT	JPN	SPA	FRA	ITA	CAT	NED; 14	GER	GBR	CZE	INP	RSM	POR	AUS	MAL	VAL		31st	2
2010	125cc	Honda	QAT	SPA	FRA	ITA	GBR	NED	CAT	GER; Ret	CZE	INP	RSM	ARA	JPN	MAL	AUS	POR	VAL	NC	0
2011	125cc	Honda	QAT	SPA	POR	FRA	CAT	GBR	NED	ITA	GER; Ret	CZE	INP	RSM	ARA	JPN	AUS	MAL	VAL	NC	0

=== European Superstock 600 ===
==== Races by year ====
(key) (Races in bold indicate pole position, races in italics indicate fastest lap)

Year	Bike	1	2	3	4	5	6	7	8	9	10	Pos	Pts
2011	Kawasaki	ASS	MNZ	MIS	ARA	BRN	SIL	NÜR	IMO	MAG; 26	POR	NC	0
2012	Kawasaki	IMO; 12	ASS; 13	MNZ; 25	MIS; 14	ARA; 13	BRN	SIL	NÜR	POR	MAG	23rd	12

=== European Superstock 1000 Championship ===
==== Races by year ====
(key) (Races in bold indicate pole position) (Races in italics indicate fastest lap)

Year	Bike	1	2	3	4	5	6	7	8	9	Pos	Pts
2017	Yamaha	ARA; 10	NED; DNS	IMO	DON	MIS; 11	LAU; 10	ALG	MAG; 12	JER; 14	15th	23

=== Superbike World Championship ===
==== Races by year ====
(key) (Races in bold indicate pole position) (Races in italics indicate fastest lap)

Year	Bike	1			2			3			4			5			6			7			8			9			10			11			12			13			Pos	Pts
Year	Bike	R1	SR	R2	R1	SR	R2	R1	SR	R2	R1	SR	R2	R1	SR	R2	R1	SR	R2	R1	SR	R2	R1	SR	R2	R1	SR	R2	R1	SR	R2	R1	SR	R2	R1	SR	R2	R1	SR	R2	Pos	Pts
2021	Yamaha	SPA	SPA	SPA	POR	POR	POR	ITA	ITA	ITA	GBR	GBR	GBR	NED	NED	NED	CZE; 10	CZE; 12	CZE; 19	SPA	SPA	SPA	FRA	FRA	FRA	SPA	SPA	SPA	SPA; 16	SPA; C	SPA; 16	POR	POR	POR	ARG	ARG	ARG	INA	INA	INA	24th	6
2022	Yamaha	SPA	SPA	SPA	NED	NED	NED	POR; 16	POR; Ret	POR; 17	ITA	ITA	ITA	GBR	GBR	GBR	CZE	CZE	CZE	FRA	FRA	FRA	SPA	SPA	SPA	POR; 21	POR; 17	POR; 17	ARG	ARG	ARG	INA	INA	INA	AUS	AUS	AUS				NC	0
2024	Yamaha	AUS	AUS	AUS	SPA	SPA	SPA	NED	NED	NED	ITA	ITA	ITA	GBR	GBR	GBR	CZE	CZE	CZE	POR	POR	POR	FRA	FRA	FRA	ITA; 17	ITA; Ret	ITA; 18	SPA; Ret	SPA; Ret	SPA; Ret	POR	POR	POR	SPA	SPA	SPA				30th	0

^{*} Season still in progress.

=== FIM Endurance World Championship ===
==== By team ====
Year	Team	Bike	Rider	TC
2016	Yamaha Austria Racing Team	Yamaha YZF-R1	(Australia) Broc Parkes (Germany) Max Neukirchner (Spain) Iván Silva (Germany) Marvin Fritz (Japan) Kohta Nozane (Japan) Takuya Fujita (South Africa) Sheridan Morais	6th
2016–17	Yamaha Austria Racing Team	Yamaha YZF-R1	(Australia) Broc Parkes (Spain) Iván Silva (Germany) Marvin Fritz (Japan) Kohta Nozane	**3rd**
2017–18	Yamaha Austria Racing Team	Yamaha YZF-R1	(Germany) Marvin Fritz (Germany) Max Neukirchner (Australia) Broc Parkes (Japan) Takuya Fujita (Japan) Kohta Nozane	16th
2018–19	Yamaha Austria Racing Team	Yamaha YZF-R1	(Australia) Broc Parkes (Italy) Niccolò Canepa (Germany) Marvin Fritz	4th
2019–20	Yamaha Austria Racing Team	Yamaha YZF-R1	(Germany) Marvin Fritz (Italy) Niccolò Canepa (Australia) Broc Parkes (Czech Republic) Karel Hanika (France) Loris Baz	**2nd**
2021	Yamaha Austria Racing Team	Yamaha YZF-R1	(Italy) Niccolò Canepa (Germany) Marvin Fritz (Czech Republic) Karel Hanika	6th
2022	Yamaha Austria Racing Team	Yamaha YZF-R1	(Italy) Niccolò Canepa (Germany) Marvin Fritz (Czech Republic) Karel Hanika	6th
2023	Yamaha Austria Racing Team	Yamaha YZF-R1	(Italy) Niccolò Canepa (Germany) Marvin Fritz (Czech Republic) Karel Hanika	**1st**
2024	Yamaha Austria Racing Team	Yamaha YZF-R1	(Italy) Niccolò Canepa (Germany) Marvin Fritz (Czech Republic) Karel Hanika	**2nd**

Year	Team	Bike	Tyre	Rider	Pts	TC
2025	Yamaha Austria Racing Team	Yamaha YZF-R1	**B**	(United Kingdom) Josh O'Halloran (Germany) Marvin Fritz (Czech Republic) Karel Hanika	**88***	**1st***

==== 24 Hours of Le Mans results ====
Year	Team	Riders	Bike	Pos
2026	(Austria) YART Yamaha	(Czech Republic) Karel Hanika (Germany) Marvin Fritz (Argentina) Leandro Mercado	Yamaha YZF-R1	1st

==== Suzuka 8 Hours results ====
Year	Class	Team	Co-riders	Bike	Pos
2025	**EWC**	(Austria) YART Yamaha	(Czech Republic) Karel Hanika (United Kingdom) Jason O'Halloran	Yamaha YZF-R1	Ret
2026	**EWC**	(Austria) YART Yamaha	(Czech Republic) Karel Hanika (Argentina) Leandro Mercado	Yamaha YZF-R1	TBD

==== Spa 24 Hours Motos results ====
Year	Team	Riders	Bike	Pos
2023	Yamaha Austria Racing Team	(Italy) Niccolò Canepa (Czech Republic) Karel Hanika	Yamaha YZF-R1	1st
2024	Yamaha Austria Racing Team	(Italy) Niccolò Canepa (Czech Republic) Karel Hanika	Yamaha YZF-R1	1st
