= Karel Hanika =

Czech motorcycle racer

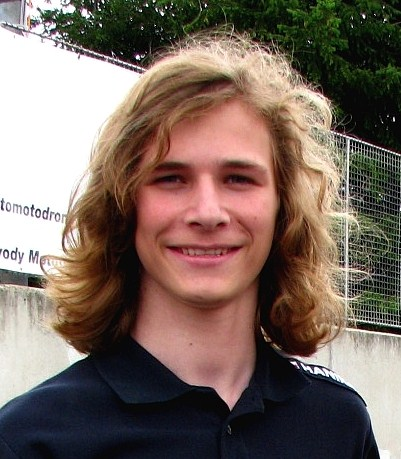
- Hanika in 2012
- Nationality: Czech
- Born: 14 April 1996 (age 30); Brno, Czech Republic
- Current team: YART Yamaha
- Bike number: 98
Motorcycle racing career statistics
Moto2 World Championship
Active years	2017
Manufacturers	Kalex
Championships	0
2017 championship position	41st (0 pts)
Starts / Wins / Podiums / Poles / F. laps / Points; 1 / 0 / 0 / 0 / 0 / 0
Moto3 World Championship
Active years	2014–2016
Manufacturers	KTM, Mahindra
Championships	0
2016 championship position	38th (0 pts)
Starts / Wins / Podiums / Poles / F. laps / Points; 45 / 0 / 0 / 0 / 0 / 87
Superbike World Championship
Active years	2018, 2021
Manufacturers	Yamaha
Championships	0
2021 championship position	NC (0 pts)
Starts / Wins / Podiums / Poles / F. laps / Points; 5 / 0 / 0 / 0 / 0 / 5
Supersport World Championship
Active years	2020
Manufacturers	Yamaha
Championships	0
2020 championship position	20th (16 pts)
Starts / Wins / Podiums / Poles / F. laps / Points; 4 / 0 / 0 / 0 / 0 / 16

Karel Hanika (born 14 April 1996) is a motorcycle racer from the Czech Republic. He is the 2013 Red Bull MotoGP Rookies Cup champion and the 2013 European Moto3 champion. He currently competes in the Alpe Adria International Road Race Superbike Championship, aboard a BMW S1000RR.

In 2014 and 2015, Hanika raced for the Ajo Motorsport team in the Moto3 world championship.

After two crash-filled seasons, Hanika was dropped by Ajo and switched to Mahindra for the 2016 campaign. However, after failing to score a single point in seven races, he was fired mid-season and replaced by Moto3 returnee Danny Webb.

== Career statistics ==
=== Red Bull MotoGP Rookies Cup ===
==== Races by year ====
(key) (Races in bold indicate pole position, races in italics indicate fastest lap)

Year	1	2	3	4	5	6	7	8	9	10	11	12	13	14	15	Pos	Pts
2012	SPA1; Ret	SPA2; 16	POR1; 3	POR2; 3	**GBR1**; 10	**GBR2**; 3	**NED1**; 6	**NED2**; Ret	GER1; 3	GER2; 9	**CZE1**; 1	**CZE2**; 16	RSM; 1	**ARA1**; 5	**ARA2**; 1	3rd	162
2013	**AME1**; 2	**AME2**; 1	**JER1**; 2	**JER2**; 2	**ASS1**; 1	**ASS2**; 1	SAC1; Ret	SAC2; 1	**BRN**; 1	**SIL1**; 1	**SIL2**; Ret	MIS; Ret	**ARA1**; 1	**ARA2**; Ret		1st	235

=== FIM CEV Moto3 Junior World Championship ===
==== Races by year ====
(key) (Races in bold indicate pole position, races in italics indicate fastest lap)

Year	Bike	1	2	3	4	5	6	7	8	9	10	11	12	Pos	Pts
2016	KTM	VAL1	VAL2	LMS	ARA	CAT1	CAT2	ALB; 5	ALG; Ret	**JER1**; 16	**JER2**; 3	VAL1; 3	VAL2; 4	13th	56

=== FIM CEV Moto2 European Championship ===
==== Races by year ====
(key) (Races in bold indicate pole position, races in italics indicate fastest lap)

Year	Bike	1	2	3	4	5	6	7	8	9	10	11	Pos	Pts
2017	Kalex	ALB	CAT1	CAT2	VAL1	VAL2	EST1	EST2	JER	ARA1; 14	ARA2; 10	VAL; 9	21st	15

=== Grand Prix motorcycle racing ===
==== By season ====
Season	Class	Motorcycle	Team	Race	Win	Podium	Pole	FLap	Pts	Plcd
2014	Moto3	KTM	Red Bull KTM Ajo	18	0	0	0	0	44	18th
2015	Moto3	KTM	Red Bull KTM Ajo	18	0	0	0	0	43	18th
2016	Moto3	Mahindra	Platinum Bay Real Estate	9	0	0	0	0	0	38th
2016	Moto3	KTM	Freudenberg Racing Team	9	0	0	0	0	0	38th
2017	Moto2	Kalex	Willirace Team	1	0	0	0	0	0	41st
Total				**46**	**0**	**0**	**0**	**0**	**87**	

==== Races by year ====
(key) (Races in bold indicate pole position; races in italics indicate fastest lap)

Year	Class	Bike	1	2	3	4	5	6	7	8	9	10	11	12	13	14	15	16	17	18	Pos	Pts
2014	Moto3	KTM	QAT; 14	AME; 10	ARG; Ret	SPA; 19	FRA; Ret	ITA; 10	CAT; 14	NED; Ret	GER; Ret	INP; 13	CZE; 15	GBR; 12	RSM; Ret	ARA; 23	JPN; 12	AUS; 13	MAL; 9	VAL; 10	18th	44
2015	Moto3	KTM	QAT; 13	AME; 10	ARG; 7	SPA; 22	FRA; 20	ITA; 28	CAT; Ret	NED; 8	GER; 13	INP; 12	CZE; 26	GBR; Ret	RSM; 21	ARA; Ret	JPN; 8	AUS; 14	MAL; Ret	VAL; Ret	18th	43
2016	Moto3	Mahindra	QAT; 30	ARG; 24	AME; Ret	SPA; Ret	FRA; Ret	ITA; 20	CAT; Ret	NED	GER	AUT									38th	0
2016	Moto3	KTM											CZE; 16	GBR	RSM	ARA	JPN	AUS	MAL	VAL; 22	38th	0
2017	Moto2	Kalex	QAT	ARG	AME	SPA	FRA	ITA	CAT	NED	GER	CZE; 22	AUT	GBR	RSM	ARA	JPN	AUS	MAL	VAL	41st	0

=== Supersport World Championship ===
==== Races by year ====
(key) (Races in bold indicate pole position, races in italics indicate fastest lap)

Year	Bike	1	2	3	4	5	6	7	8	9	10	11	12	13	14	15	16	17	18	19	20	21	22	23	24	Pos	Pts
2021	Yamaha	SPA	SPA	POR	POR	ITA	ITA	NED	NED	CZE	CZE	SPA	SPA	FRA	FRA	SPA	SPA	SPA; C	SPA	POR	POR	ARG; Ret	ARG; 5	INA; Ret	INA; 11	21st	27

=== Superbike World Championship ===
==== Races by year ====
(key) (Races in bold indicate pole position; races in italics indicate fastest lap)

Year	Bike	1		2		3		4		5		6		7		8		9		10		11		12		13		Pos	Pts
Year	Bike	R1	R2	R1	R2	R1	R2	R1	R2	R1	R2	R1	R2	R1	R2	R1	R2	R1	R2	R1	R2	R1	R2	R1	R2	R1	R2	Pos	Pts
2018	Yamaha	AUS	AUS	THA	THA	SPA	SPA	NED	NED	ITA	ITA	GBR	GBR	CZE	CZE	USA; 13	USA; 14	ITA	ITA	POR	POR	FRA	FRA	ARG	ARG	QAT	QAT	24th	5

(key) (Races in bold indicate pole position, races in italics indicate fastest lap)

Year	Bike	1			2			3			4			5			6			7			8			9			10			11			12			13			Pos	Pts
Year	Bike	R1	SR	R2	R1	SR	R2	R1	SR	R2	R1	SR	R2	R1	SR	R2	R1	SR	R2	R1	SR	R2	R1	SR	R2	R1	SR	R2	R1	SR	R2	R1	SR	R2	R1	SR	R2	R1	SR	R2	Pos	Pts
2021	Yamaha	SPA	SPA	SPA	POR	POR	POR	ITA	ITA	ITA	GBR	GBR	GBR	NED	NED	NED	CZE; Ret	CZE; Ret	CZE; 18	SPA	SPA	SPA	FRA	FRA	FRA	SPA	SPA	SPA	SPA	SPA	SPA	POR	POR	POR	ARG	ARG	ARG	INA	INA	INA	NC	0

=== FIM Endurance World Championship ===
==== By team ====
Year	Team	Bike	Rider	TC
2019–20	Yamaha Austria Racing Team	Yamaha YZF-R1	(Germany) Marvin Fritz (Italy) Niccolò Canepa (Australia) Broc Parkes (Czech Republic) Karel Hanika (France) Loris Baz	2nd
2021	Yamaha Austria Racing Team	Yamaha YZF-R1	(Italy) Niccolò Canepa (Germany) Marvin Fritz (Czech Republic) Karel Hanika	6th
2022	Yamaha Austria Racing Team	Yamaha YZF-R1	(Italy) Niccolò Canepa (Germany) Marvin Fritz (Czech Republic) Karel Hanika	6th
2023	Yamaha Austria Racing Team	Yamaha YZF-R1	(Italy) Niccolò Canepa (Germany) Marvin Fritz (Czech Republic) Karel Hanika	1st
2024	Yamaha Austria Racing Team	Yamaha YZF-R1	(Italy) Niccolò Canepa (Germany) Marvin Fritz (Czech Republic) Karel Hanika	2nd

Year	Team	Bike	Tyre	Rider	Pts	TC
2025	Yamaha Austria Racing Team	Yamaha YZF-R1	**B**	(United Kingdom) Jason O'Halloran (Germany) Marvin Fritz (Czech Republic) Karel Hanika	88*	1st*

==== 24 Hours of Le Mans results ====
Year	Team	Riders	Bike	Pos
2026	(Austria) YART Yamaha	(Czech Republic) Karel Hanika (Germany) Marvin Fritz (Argentina) Leandro Mercado	Yamaha YZF-R1	1st

==== Suzuka 8 Hours ====
Year	Class	Team	Co-riders	Bike	Pos
2025	**EWC**	(Austria) YART Yamaha	(Germany) Marvin Fritz (United Kingdom) Jason O'Halloran	Yamaha YZF-R1	Ret
2026	**EWC**	(Austria) YART Yamaha	(Germany) Marvin Fritz (Argentina) Leandro Mercado	Yamaha YZF-R1	TBD

==== Spa 24 Hours Motos results ====
Year	Team	Riders	Bike	Pos
2023	Yamaha Austria Racing Team	(Germany) Marvin Fritz (Italy) Niccolò Canepa	Yamaha YZF-R1	1st
2024	Yamaha Austria Racing Team	(Germany) Marvin Fritz (Italy) Niccolò Canepa	Yamaha YZF-R1	1st

Sporting positions
Preceded by Florian Alt	Red Bull MotoGP Rookies Cup champion 2013	Succeeded by Jorge Martín
