= Yamaha Austria Racing Team =

Austrian World Endurance Championship team

(Austria) YART
- 2025 name: Yamaha Austria Racing Team
- Base: Heimschuh, Styria, Austria
- Team principal/s: Manfred Kainz
- Race riders: FIM Endurance World Championship: 7. (Germany) Marvin Fritz, (United Kingdom) Jason O' Halloran, (Czech Republic) Karel Hanika
- Motorcycle: Yamaha YZF R1
- Tyres: Bridgestone
- Riders' Championships: 3 EWC

The Yamaha Austria Racing Team (YART) is a World Endurance Championship racing team based in Heimschuh, Styria, Austria. YART is also one of three official GYTR (Genuine Yamaha Technology Racing) Pro Shops in Europe, alongside Crescent Racing in the UK and Ten Kate Racing in the Netherlands. YART was founded in 2001 by "Mandy" Manfred Kainz; it finished runner up in 2006 and 2008 and won 2009, 2023 and 2025 the FIM Endurance World Championship.

In 2020 Yamaha Motor Europe and YART unveiled a limited edition Petronas Yamaha SRT replica YZF-R1. The 46 machines were commissioned to celebrate 46 years of Petronas oil business and cost €46,000 each. The bikes were available to European customers only.

== Achievements ==
- 2006 – Endurance Vice Worldchampions on Yamaha
- 2008 – Endurance Vice Worldchampions on Yamaha Winner 8 Hours Doha
- 2009 – Endurance Worldchampions on Yamaha Winner 24 Hours Le Mans //8 Hours Albacete //Oschersleben//Doha
- 2019/20 – Endurance Vice Worldchampions on Yamaha Winner 8 Hours Sepang // Winner 12 Hours Estoril
- 2023 – Endurance Worldchampions on Yamaha // Winner 24 Hours Spa
- 2024 – Endurance Vice Worldchampions on Yamaha // 2nd Suzuka 8 Hours //Winner 8 Hours Spa
- 2025 – Endurance Worldchampions on Yamaha //Winner 24 Hours Le Mans]] on Yamaha
- 2026 – FIM Endurance World Championship on Yamaha //Winner 24 Hours Le Mans]] on Yamaha
- 13 Victories in FIM Endurance World Championship
- 22 Pole-Positions in FIM Endurance World Championship
- 15 Fastest Racelaps in FIM Endurance World Championship
- 45 Podiumsfinishes FIM Endurance World Championship

== EWC-Season in numbers ==
| Season | Tires | Points | Wins | Poles | FL | WC Standing | Riders |
|---|---|---|---|---|---|---|---|
| 2001 | (Germany) Metzeler | 2 | – | – | – | – | (Austria) Manfred Kainz (Austria) Horst Saiger |
| 2002 | (Germany) Metzeler | 30 | – | – | – | 9. | (Austria) Horst Saiger (Austria) Erwin Wilding (Slovenia) Mirko Kalsek |
| 2003 | (Italy) Pirelli | 62 | – | – | – | 7. | (Austria) Horst Saiger (Austria) Erwin Wilding (Austria) Karl Truchsess |
| 2004 | (Italy) Pirelli | 100 | – | – | – | 4. | (Slovenia) Igor Jerman (Austria) Horst Saiger (Austria) Thomas Hinterreiter (United Kingdom) James Ellison (United Kingdom) Mike Edwards (United Kingdom) Gary Mason (Australia) Dean Thomas (France) Marc Garcia |
| 2005 | (United Kingdom) Dunlop | 62 | – | – | – | 3. | (Slovenia) Igor Jerman (France) Gwen Giabbani (Austria) Horst Saiger (Austria) Thomas Hinterreiter |
| 2006 | (Italy) Pirelli | 150 | 1 | – | 1 | 2. | (Slovenia) Igor Jerman (France) Gwen Giabbani (France) Sebastien Scarnato |
| 2007 | (Italy) Pirelli | 75 | – | – | – | 3. | (Slovenia) Igor Jerman (Australia) Steve Martin (Australia) Damian Cudlin (France) Sebastien Scarnato |
| 2008 | (United Kingdom) Dunlop | 95 | 1 | – | 1 | 2. | (Slovenia) Igor Jerman (Australia) Steve Martin (United Kingdom) Steve Plater (France) Gwen Giabbani |
| 2009 | (France) Michelin | 145 | 4 | 1 | 3 | 1. | (Slovenia) Igor Jerman (Australia) Steve Martin (France) Gwen Giabbani |
| 2010 | (France) Michelin | 60 | - | - | - | 3. | (Slovenia) Igor Jerman (Australia) Steve Martin (France) Gwen Giabbani |
| 2011 | (France) Michelin | 54 | - | - | 1 | 5. | (Slovenia) Igor Jerman (Australia) Steve Martin (France) Gwen Giabbani (Japan) Katsuyuki Nakasuga (France) Loris Baz |
| 2012 | (France) Michelin | 59 | - | 1 | 1 | 6. | (Slovenia) Igor Jerman (Australia) Steve Martin (France) Gwen Giabbani (Japan) Noriyuki Haga (Japan) Katsuyuki Nakasuga (United Kingdom) Tommy Hill |
| 2013 | (France) Michelin | 71 | - | 1 | 1 | 5. | (Slovenia) Igor Jerman (Australia) Broc Parkes (Australia) Josh Waters (South Africa) Sheridan Morais (Japan) Katsuyuki Nakasuga (United States) Josh Hayes |
| 2014 | (Italy) Pirelli | 70 | - | - | 1 | 6. | (United Kingdom) Michael Laverty (Australia) Broc Parkes (Slovenia) Igor Jerman (South Africa) Sheridan Morais (Australia) Ricky Olson (Australia) Wayne Maxwell (United Kingdom) Thomas Bridewell |
| 2015 | (Italy) Pirelli | 41 | - | 1 | 1 | 10. | (Germany) Max Neukirchner (Australia) Broc Parkes (Spain) Iván Silva (South Africa) Sheridan Morais |
| 2016 | (Italy) Pirelli | 60 | - | - | 1 | 6. | (Germany) Max Neukirchner (Australia) Broc Parkes (Germany) Marvin Fritz (Japan) Kohta Nozane (Japan) Takuya Fujita (Spain) Iván Silva (South Africa) Sheridan Morais |
| 2017 | (Japan) Bridgestone | 130,5 | - | 1 | 1 | 3. | (United States) Josh Hayes (Australia) Broc Parkes (Spain) Iván Silva (South Africa) Sheridan Morais (Japan) Kohta Nozane |
| 2017/2018 | (Japan) Bridgestone | 30 | 1 | 1 | 1 | 16. | (Germany) Max Neukirchner (Australia) Broc Parkes (Germany) Marvin Fritz (Japan) Takuya Fujita (Japan) Kohta Nozane |
| 2018/2019 | (Japan) Bridgestone | 110,5 | 1 | 1 | - | 4. | (Italy) Niccolo Canepa (Australia) Broc Parkes (Germany) Marvin Fritz |
| 2019/2020 | (Japan) Bridgestone | 149,5 | 2 | 3 | - | 2. | (Italy) Niccolo Canepa (Australia) Broc Parkes (Germany) Marvin Fritz (France) Loris Baz (Czech Republic) Karel Hanika |
| 2021 | (Japan) Bridgestone | 88 | | 3 | 1 | 6. | (Italy) Niccolo Canepa (Germany) Marvin Fritz (Czech Republic) Karel Hanika |
| 2022 | (Japan) Bridgestone | 97 | | 2 | | 6. | (Italy) Niccolo Canepa (Germany) Marvin Fritz (Czech Republic) Karel Hanika |
| 2023 | (Japan) Bridgestone | 181 | 1 | 1 | | 1. | (Italy) Niccolo Canepa (Germany) Marvin Fritz (Czech Republic) Karel Hanika |
| 2024 | (Japan) Bridgestone | 159 | 1 | 3 | 1 | 2. | (Italy) Niccolo Canepa (Germany) Marvin Fritz (Czech Republic) Karel Hanika |
| 2025 | (Japan) Bridgestone | 139 | 1 | 1 | | 1. | (Germany) Marvin Fritz (Czech Republic) Karel Hanika (United Kingdom) Jason O'Halloran |
| 2026 | (Japan) Bridgestone | 91 | 1 | 1 | | 1. | (Germany) Marvin Fritz (Czech Republic) Karel Hanika (Argentina) Leandro Mercado |

== Endurance WC results ==
| Season | | 1 | 2 | 3 | 4 | 5 | 6 | 7 | Position | Points | Victories |
|---|---|---|---|---|---|---|---|---|---|---|---|
| 2026 | Nr. | Le Mans | Spa | Suzuka | Bol d'Or | | | | 1. | 91 | |
| 2026 | 1 | 1 | 2 | | | | | | 1. | 91 | 24H Le Mans |
| 2025 | Nr. | Le Mans | Spa | Suzuka | Bol d'Or | | | | 1. | 139 | |
| 2025 | 7 | 1 | 3 | DNF | 2 | | | | 1. | 139 | 24H Le Mans |
| 2024 | Nr. | Le Mans | Spa | Suzuka | Bol d'Or | | | | 2. | 159 | |
| 2024 | 1 | 3 | 1 | 2 | 3 | | | | 2. | 159 | 8H Spa |
| 2023 | Nr. | Le Mans | Spa | Suzuka | Bol d'Or | | | | 1. | 181 | |
| 2023 | 7 | 2 | 1 | 18 | 4 | | | | 1. | 181 | 24H Spa |
| 2022 | Nr. | Le Mans | Spa | Suzuka | Bol d'Or | | | | 6. | 97 | |
| 2022 | 7 | 2 | DNF | 7 | DNF | | | | 6. | 97 | |
| 2021 | Nr. | Le Mans | Estoril | Bol d'Or | Most | | | | 6. | 88 | |
| 2021 | 7 | DNF | 8 | DNF | 2 | | | | 6. | 88 | |
| 2019-20 | Nr. | Bol d'Or | Sepang | Le Mans | Estoril | | | | 2. | 149,5 | |
| 2019-20 | 7 | DNF | 1 | 4 | 1 | | | | 2. | 149,5 | 8H Sepang; 12H Estoril |
| 2018-19 | Nr. | Bol d'Or | Le Mans | Slowakia | Oschersleben | Suzuka | | | 4. | 110,5 | |
| 2018-19 | 7 | 2 | DNF | 1 | DNF | 6 | | | 4. | 110,5 | 8H Slowakia |
| 2017-18 | Nr. | Bol d'Or | Le Mans | Slowakia | Oschersleben | Suzuka | | | 16. | 30 | |
| 2017-18 | 7 | DNF | DNF | 1 | DNF | DNF | | | 16. | 30 | 8H Slowakia |
| 2016-17 | Nr. | Bol d'Or | Le Mans | Oschersleben | Slowakia | Suzuka | | | 3. | 130,5 | |
| 2016-17 | 7 | DNF | 2 | 2 | 4 | 5 | | | 3. | 130,5 | |
| 2016 | Nr. | Le Mans | Portimao | Suzuka | Oschersleben | | | | 6. | 60 | |
| 2016 | 7 | 11 | 4 | 4 | DNF | | | | 6. | 60 | |
| 2015 | Nr. | Le Mans | Suzuka | Oschersleben | Bol d'Or | | | | 10. | 41 | |
| 2015 | 7 | DNF | DNF | 3 | DNF | | | | 10. | 41 | |
| 2014 | Nr. | Bol d'Or | Suzuka | Oschersleben | Le Mans | | | | 6. | 70 | |
| 2014 | 7 | DNF | 10 (4) | 9 | 3 | | | | 6. | 70 | |
| 2013 | Nr. | Bol d'Or | Suzuka | Oschersleben | Le Mans | | | | 5. | 71 | |
| 2013 | 7 | 2 | 8 | 3 | DNF | | | | 5. | 71 | |
| 2012 | Nr. | Bol d'Or | Doha | Suzuka | Oschersleben | Le Mans | | | 6. | 59 | |
| 2012 | 7 | 3 | DNF | DNF | 7 | 7 | | | 6. | 59 | |
| 2011 | Nr. | Bol d'Or | Albacete | Suzuka | Le Mans | Doha | | | 5. | 54 | |
| 2011 | 7 | DNF | 4 | DNF | 3 | 4 | | | 5. | 54 | |
| 2010 | Nr. | Le Mans | Albacete | Suzuka | Bol d'Or | Doha | | | 3. | 60 | |
| 2010 | 1 | 2 | 21 | 16 | DNF | 2 | | | 3. | 60 | |
| 2009 | Nr. | Le Mans | Oschersleben | Albacete | Suzuka | Bol d'Or | Doha | | 1. | 145 | |
| 2009 | 7 | 1 | 1 | 1 | 4 | 34 | 1 | | 1. | 145 | 24H Le Mans; 8H Oschersleben; 8H Albacete; 8H Doha |
| 2008 | Nr. | Le Mans | Albacete | Suzuka | Oschersleben | Bol d'Or | Doha | | 2. | 95 | |
| 2008 | 7 | DNF | 4 | 11 | 2 | 3 | 1 | | 2. | 95 | 8H Doha |
| 2007 | Nr. | Le Mans | Albacete | Suzuka | Oschersleben | Bol d'Or | Doha | | 3. | 75 | |
| 2007 | 7 | 5 | 9 | 11 | 3 | DNF | 2 | | 3. | 75 | |
| 2006 | Nr. | Assen | Le Mans | Zolder | Albacete | Suzuka | Oschersleben | Bol d'Or | 2. | 150 | |
| 2006 | 7 | 2 | DNF | 2 | 2 | 1 | 2 | 2 | 2. | 150 | 8H Suzuka SBK |
| 2005 | Nr. | Assen | Albacete | Suzuka | Oschersleben | Vallelunga | | | 3. | 62 | |
| 2005 | 7 | 5 | 3 | 9 | DNF | 3 | | | 3. | 62 | |
| 2004 | Nr. | Assen | Zhuhai | Albacete | Suzuka | Oschersleben | Vallelunga | | 4. | 100 | |
| 2004 | 7 | DNF | 5 | 4 | 13 | 2 | 7 | | 4. | 100 | |
| 2003 | Nr. | Imola | Assen | Brno | Albacete | A1-Ring | Oschersleben | Vallelunga | 7. | 62 | |
| 2003 | 9 | 3 | DNF | DNF | 7 | 7 | 7 | 6 | 7. | 62 | |
| 2002 | Nr. | Imola | Silverstone | Brno | Oschersleben | Vallelunga | | | 9. | 30 | |
| 2002 | 18 | 19 | 10 | DNF | 7 | 11 | | | 9. | 30 | |
| 2001 | Nr. | Brno | Nürburgring | | | | | | - | 2 | |
| 2001 | 19 | 14 | DNF | | | | | | - | 2 | |

== Team Crew ==
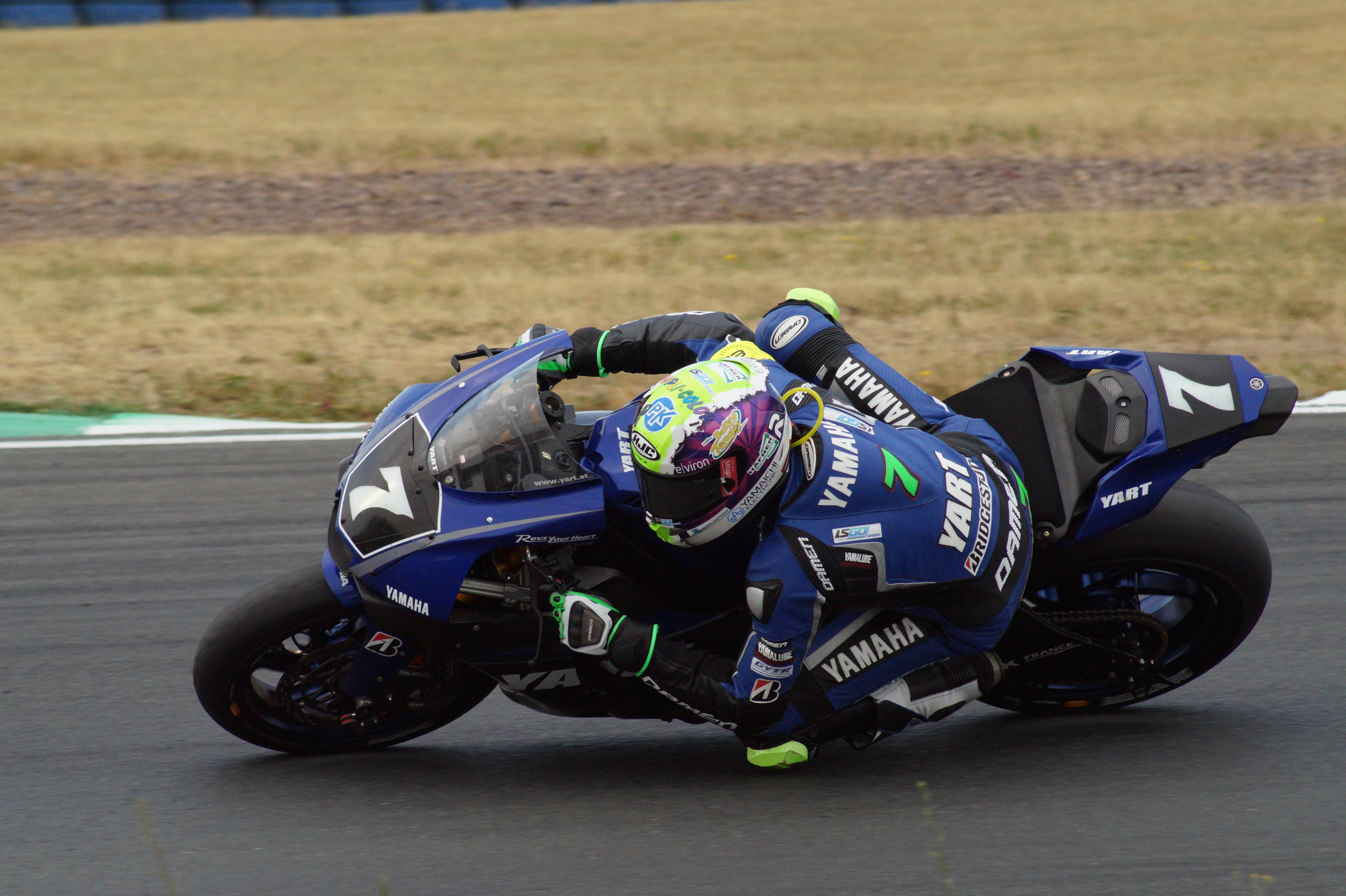
Marvin Fritz

| Work | Name |
|---|---|
| Rider 2026 | (Germany) Marvin Fritz |
| Rider 2026 | (Argentina) Leandro Mercado |
| Rider 2026 | (Czech Republic) Karel Hanika |
| Technical Director | (Austria) Josef Unger |
| Team Manager | (Austria) Manfred Kainz |
