= Paul Carew =

Australian cricketer (born 1967)

Personal information
- Born: 9 July 1967 (age 59); Brisbane, Australia
- Source: Cricinfo, 21 May 2018

Paul Carew (born 9 July 1967) is an Australian cricketer. He played six first-class matches for Queensland and South Australia between 1986 and 1990.

== See also ==
- List of Queensland first-class cricketers
- List of South Australian representative cricketers
