= Christopher Platt =

British historian and academic

Desmond Christopher Martin Platt (11 November 1934 – 15 August 1989), known as Christopher Platt or D. C. M. Platt, was a British historian and academic specialising in Latin America. Having taught at the University of Edinburgh, the University of Exeter, and Queens' College, Cambridge, he was Professor of the History of Latin America at the University of Oxford and a fellow of St Antony's College, Oxford from 1972 until his death.

== Selected works ==
- Platt, D. C. M. (1968). "Economic Factors in British Policy During the "New Imperialism"". Past & Present (1): 120–138. doi:10.1093/past/39.1.120.
