= Illia Mykhalchyk =

Ukrainian motorcycle racer (born 1996)

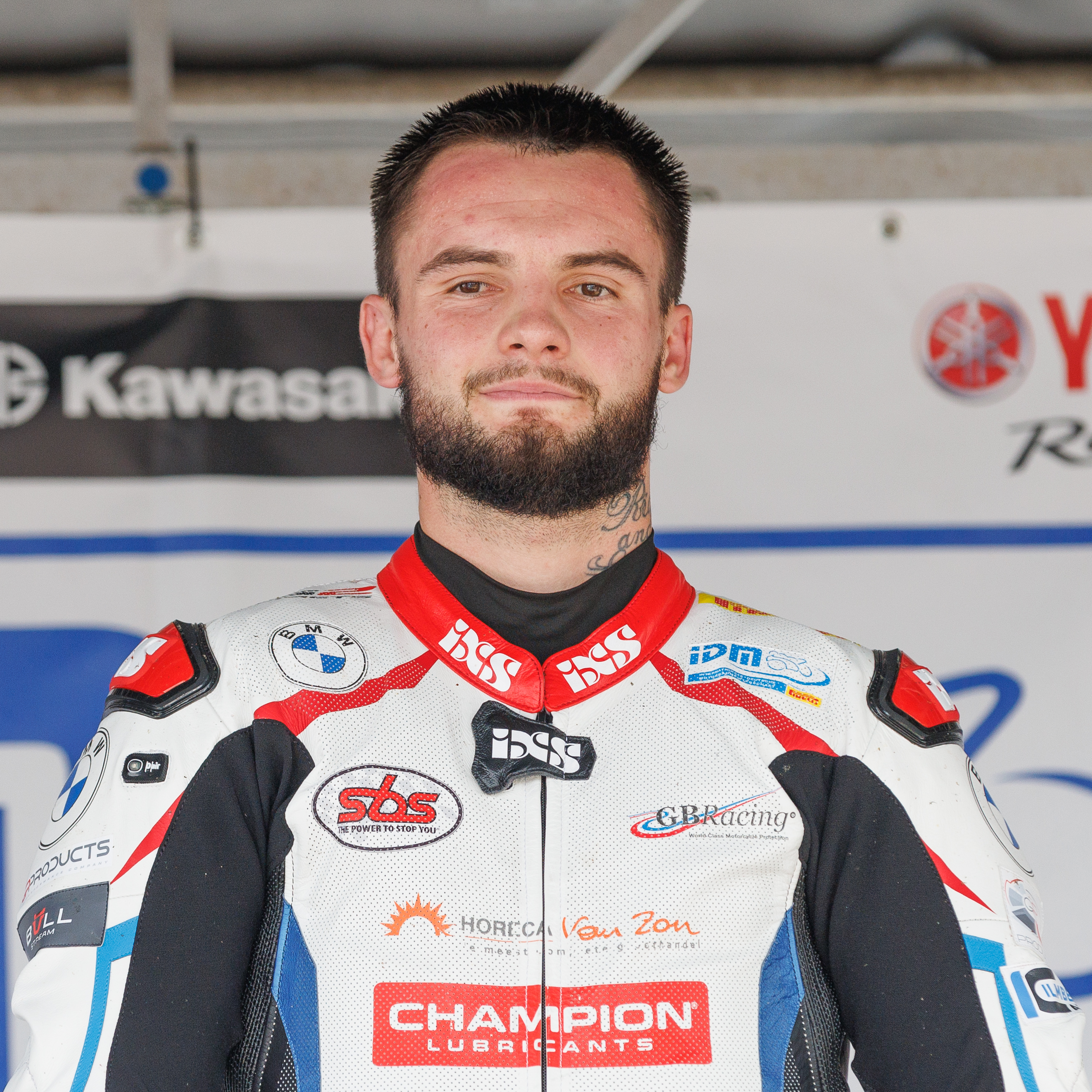
- Mykhalchyk in 2024
- Nationality: Ukrainian
- Born: 17 August 1996 (age 30); Kyiv, Ukraine
- Current team: ROKiT BMW Motorrad British Superbike Race Team
- Bike number: 17
Motorcycle racing career statistics
Superbike World Championship
Active years	2022–
Manufacturers	BMW
Championships	0
2022 championship position	22nd (10 pts)
Starts / Wins / Podiums / Poles / F. laps / Points; 9 / 0 / 0 / 0 / 0 / 10

Illia Mykhalchyk (born August 17, 1996) is a Ukrainian motorcycle racer. He competed in the 2022 FIM Endurance World Championship and Superbike World Championship with BMW Motorrad.

== Career ==
Mykhalchyk started his international racing career in 2012, racing in the European Junior Cup with Wind Racing. He finished tenth in 2012 with a podium. In 2013, he dropped ten places in the standings and finished 20th, with a best result of tenth.

In 2014 and 2015, Mykhalchyk raced in the European Superstock 600 Championship with Team GoEleven and finished sixth and 13th in the standings respectively. He made a step up into the Supersport World Championship for 2016, riding for the DS Junior Team. He took part in the European rounds on a Kawasaki Ninja ZX-6R, with his best finish being sixth in Assen.

In 2017, Mykhalchyk made a step to the European Superstock 1000 Championship, finishing ninth with a second place podium.

In 2018, Mykhalchyk joined the IDM Superbike Championship with Alpha Van-Zon BMW. He won nine races out of fourteen and won the championship by 31 points over Bastien Mackels. In 2019, he defended his championship with 11 wins in 15 races. He finished the seasion with a 115 point gap over his teammate, who was Julian Puffe.

Mykhalchyk replaced Michael van der Mark in the 2022 Superbike World Championship for Shaun Muir Racing in the rounds van der Mark was unable to participate in, due to injury.

In 2025, Mykhalchyk moved to the British Superstock Championship with the ROKiT BMW Motorrad team.

== Career statistics ==
=== Motorcycle racing ===
- 2017 - 9th, European Superstock 1000 Championship, Kawasaki ZX-10R
- 2024 - 1st, German IDM Superbike Championship, BMW S1000RR.

==== Career summary ====
Season	Series	Number	Races	Wins	Podiums	Poles	FLap	Pts	Plcd
2012	European Junior Cup	55	8	0	1	0	0	50	10th
2013	European Junior Cup	55	8	0	0	0	0	19	20th
2014	European Superstock 600 Championship	55	7	0	0	0	0	61	6th
2015	European Superstock 600 Championship	55	7	0	0	0	0	33	13th
2016	Supersport World Championship	55	8	0	0	0	0	39	15th
2017	European Superstock 1000 Championship	55	9	0	1	0	0	66	9th
2018	IDM Superbike Championship	50	14	9	13	6	-	314	1st
2019	IDM Superbike Championship	1	15	11	13	4	-	320	1st
2020	IDM Superbike Championship	1	8	0	7	0	-	143	2nd
2021	IDM Superbike Championship	17	10	4	7	1	-	176	1st
2022	Superbike World Championship	37	3	0	0	0	0	9	17th
2023	IDM Superbike Championship	17	12	6	7	4	-	196	2nd
2024	IDM Superbike Championship	17	14	9	13	2	-	299	1st

=== European Superstock 1000 Championship ===
==== Races by year ====
(key) (Races in bold indicate pole position) (Races in italics indicate fastest lap)

Year	Bike	1	2	3	4	5	6	7	8	9	Pos	Pts
2017	Kawasaki	ARA; 8	NED; 6	IMO; Ret	DON; 6	MIS; 9	LAU; Ret	ALG; Ret	MAG; 5	JER; 2	9th	66

=== Superbike World Championship ===
==== By season ====
Season	Class	Motorcycle	Team	Number	Race	Win	Podium	Pole	FLap	Pts	Plcd
2022	SBK	BMW	BMW Motorrad WorldSBK Team	37	9	0	0	0	0	10	22nd
Total					**9**	**0**	**0**	**0**	**0**	**10**	

==== Races by year ====
(key) (Races in bold indicate pole position) (Races in italics indicate fastest lap)

Year	Bike	1			2			3			4			5			6			7			8			9			10			11			12			Pos	Pts
Year	Bike	R1	SR	R2	R1	SR	R2	R1	SR	R2	R1	SR	R2	R1	SR	R2	R1	SR	R2	R1	SR	R2	R1	SR	R2	R1	SR	R2	R1	SR	R2	R1	SR	R2	R1	SR	R2	Pos	Pts
2022	BMW	SPA; 8	SPA; Ret	SPA; 15	NED	NED	NED	POR	POR	POR	ITA; 18	ITA; 15	ITA; 15	GBR; 16	GBR; 18	GBR; Ret	CZE	CZE	CZE	FRA	FRA	FRA	SPA	SPA	SPA	POR	POR	POR	ARG	ARG	ARG	INA	INA	INA	AUS	AUS	AUS	22nd	10

^{*} Season still in progress.

=== FIM Endurance World Championship ===
==== By team ====
Year	Team	Bike	Rider	TC
2021	(Belgium) BMW Motorrad World Endurance Team	BMW S1000RR	(Germany) Markus Reiterberger (Ukraine) Illia Mykhalchyk (France) Kenny Foray (Spain) Javier Forés	2nd
2023	(Belgium) BMW Motorrad World Endurance Team	BMW S1000RR	(Germany) Markus Reiterberger (Ukraine) Illia Mykhalchyk (France) Jérémy Guarnoni	3rd
2024	(Belgium) BMW Motorrad World Endurance Team	BMW S1000RR	(Germany) Markus Reiterberger (Ukraine) Illia Mykhalchyk (France) Sylvain Guintoli	3rd

Year	Team	Bike	Tyre	Rider	Pts	TC
2025	(Germany) ERC Endurance	BMW S1000RR	**D**	(Ukraine) Illia Mykhalchyk (France) Kenny Foray (Spain) David Checa	58*	5th*

==== Spa 24 Hours Motos results ====
Year	Team	Riders	Bike	Pos
2022	(Belgium) BMW Motorrad World Endurance Team	(Germany) Markus Reiterberger (France) Jeremy Guarnoni	BMW S1000RR	1st

=== Suzuka 8 Hours results ===
Year	Team	Riders	Bike	Pos
2025	(Belgium) ERC Endurance	(Ukraine) Illia Mykhalchyk (France) Kenny Foray (Spain) David Checa	BMW S1000RR	11th
