= 2019 MotoE World Cup =

1st running of the MotoE World Cup

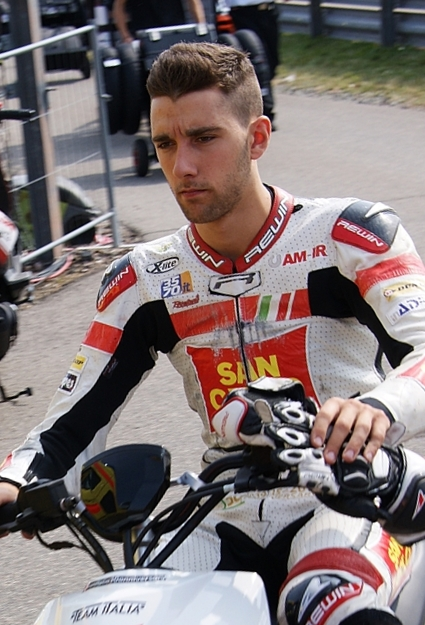
Matteo Ferrari (pictured in 2015) was the 2019 MotoE World Cup winner.

The 2019 MotoE World Cup (known officially as the 2019 FIM Enel MotoE World Cup for sponsorship reasons) was the inaugural season of the MotoE World Cup for electric motorcycle racing, and was a support series of the 71st Fédération Internationale de Motocyclisme (FIM) Road Racing World Championship season.

The season was delayed because of a fire that destroyed 18 Energica Ego Corsa motorcycles.

After six races between July and November 2019, Italian rider Matteo Ferrari from the Trentino Gresini MotoE team became the first MotoE champion.

== Teams and riders ==
All teams used the series-specified Energica Ego Corsa.

Team	No.	Rider	Rounds
(Finland) Ajo MotoE	66	(Finland) Niki Tuuli	1–3
(Finland) Ajo MotoE	44	(France) Lucas Mahias	4
(Spain) Avintia Esponsorama Racing	10	(Belgium) Xavier Siméon	All
(Spain) Avintia Esponsorama Racing	51	(Brazil) Eric Granado	All
(Germany) Dynavolt Intact GP	2	(Switzerland) Jesko Raffin	All
(Belgium) EG 0,0 Marc VDS	63	(France) Mike Di Meglio	All
(Spain) Join Contract Pons 40	15	(Spain) Sete Gibernau	All
(Monaco) LCR E-Team	7	(Italy) Niccolò Canepa	All
(Monaco) LCR E-Team	14	(France) Randy de Puniet	All
(Italy) Octo Pramac MotoE	5	(San Marino) Alex de Angelis	All
(Italy) Octo Pramac MotoE	16	(Australia) Joshua Hook	All
(Malaysia) One Energy Racing	38	(United Kingdom) Bradley Smith	All
(Italy) Ongetta SIC58 Squadra Corse	27	(Italy) Mattia Casadei	All
(Spain) Openbank Ángel Nieto Team	6	(Spain) María Herrera	All
(Spain) Openbank Ángel Nieto Team	18	(Spain) Nicolás Terol	All
(France) Tech3 E-Racing	4	(Spain) Héctor Garzó	All
(France) Tech3 E-Racing	78	(France) Kenny Foray	All
(Italy) Trentino Gresini MotoE	11	(Italy) Matteo Ferrari	All
(Italy) Trentino Gresini MotoE	32	(Italy) Lorenzo Savadori	All

Key
Regular rider
Replacement rider

== Calendar ==
The following Grands Prix took place during the season:

Round	Date	Grand Prix	Circuit
1	7 July	(Germany) HJC Helmets Motorrad Grand Prix Deutschland	Sachsenring, Hohenstein-Ernstthal
2	11 August	(Austria) myWorld Motorrad Grand Prix von Österreich	Red Bull Ring, Spielberg
3	14 September	Gran Premio Octo di San Marino e della Riviera di Rimini	Misano World Circuit, Misano Adriatico
3	15 September	Gran Premio Octo di San Marino e della Riviera di Rimini	Misano World Circuit, Misano Adriatico
4	16 November	(Valencian Community) Gran Premio Motul de la Comunitat Valenciana	Circuit Ricardo Tormo, Valencia
4	17 November	(Valencian Community) Gran Premio Motul de la Comunitat Valenciana	Circuit Ricardo Tormo, Valencia

=== Jerez paddock fire ===
In March, all MotoE teams tested the new motorcycles at the Circuito de Jerez but the newly built facility which housed the machines was destroyed by a fire which started around 12:15 a.m. of 14 March. Organizer Dorna Sports announced an investigation into the accident where no-one was injured. The remainder of the scheduled tests were cancelled. A new pre-season test session took place in June and the start of the season was pushed back to the German GP, with the missed starting rounds at Jerez and Le Mans replaced by a doubleheader at the season finale in Valencia.

== Results and standings ==
=== Grands Prix ===
Round	Grand Prix	Pole position	Fastest lap	Winning rider	Winning team	Report
1	(Germany) German motorcycle Grand Prix	(Finland) Niki Tuuli	(Finland) Niki Tuuli	(Finland) Niki Tuuli	(Finland) Ajo MotoE	Report
2	(Austria) Austrian motorcycle Grand Prix	(France) Mike Di Meglio	(France) Mike Di Meglio	(France) Mike Di Meglio	(Belgium) EG 0,0 Marc VDS	Report
3	San Marino and Rimini Riviera motorcycle Grand Prix	(San Marino) Alex de Angelis	(Italy) Matteo Ferrari	(Italy) Matteo Ferrari	(Italy) Trentino Gresini MotoE	Report
3	San Marino and Rimini Riviera motorcycle Grand Prix	(San Marino) Alex de Angelis	(Spain) Héctor Garzó	(Italy) Matteo Ferrari	(Italy) Trentino Gresini MotoE	Report
4	Valencian Community motorcycle Grand Prix	(Brazil) Eric Granado	(Brazil) Eric Granado	(Brazil) Eric Granado	(Spain) Avintia Esponsorama Racing	Report
4	Valencian Community motorcycle Grand Prix	(Brazil) Eric Granado	(Brazil) Eric Granado	(Brazil) Eric Granado	(Spain) Avintia Esponsorama Racing	Report

=== Cup standings ===
Scoring system

Points were awarded to the top fifteen finishers. A rider had to finish the race to earn points.

Position	1st	2nd	3rd	4th	5th	6th	7th	8th	9th	10th	11th	12th	13th	14th	15th
Points	25	20	16	13	11	10	9	8	7	6	5	4	3	2	1

Pos.	Rider	GER (Germany)	AUT (Austria)	RSM (San Marino)		VAL (Valencian Community)		Pts
1	(Italy) Matteo Ferrari	5	5	1^{F}	1	3	5	99
2	(United Kingdom) Bradley Smith	2	3	12	8	2	2	88
3	(Brazil) Eric Granado	8	17	13	6	1^{P F}	1^{P F}	71
4	(Spain) Héctor Garzó	4	Ret	2	2^{F}	DSQ	3	69
5	(France) Mike Di Meglio	3	1^{P F}	Ret	10	10	6	63
6	(Belgium) Xavier Siméon	7	2	3	Ret	4	Ret	58
7	(San Marino) Alex de Angelis	6	4	Ret^{P}	Ret^{P}	5	4	47
8	(Switzerland) Jesko Raffin	13	9	4	7	7	10	47
9	(Italy) Niccolò Canepa	12	8	5	4	6	Ret	46
10	(Italy) Mattia Casadei	11	13	Ret	3	9	8	39
11	(Spain) Sete Gibernau	9	6	9	Ret	11	7	38
12	(Spain) Nicolás Terol	10	14	8	9	13	9	33
13	(Australia) Joshua Hook	15	7	10	12	8	Ret	28
14	(Spain) María Herrera	16	16	6	5	14	12	27
15	(Finland) Niki Tuuli	1^{P F}	15	Ret	DNS			26
16	(Italy) Lorenzo Savadori	Ret	10	7	11	15	13	24
17	(France) Randy de Puniet	17	12	11	13	12	11	21
18	(France) Kenny Foray	14	11	Ret	14	16	14	11
	(France) Lucas Mahias					DNS	DNS	0
Pos.	Rider	GER (Germany)	AUT (Austria)	RSM (San Marino)		VAL (Valencian Community)		Pts

Race key
Colour	Result
Gold	Winner
Silver	2nd place
Bronze	3rd place
Green	Points finish
Blue	Non-points finish
Blue	Non-classified finish (NC)
Purple	Retired (Ret)
Red	Did not qualify (DNQ)
Black	Disqualified (DSQ)
White	Did not start (DNS)
White	Withdrew (WD)
White	Race cancelled (C)
Blank	Did not practice (DNP)
Blank	Excluded (EX)
Blank	Did not arrive (DNA)
Blank	Did not enter (empty cell)
Annotation	Meaning
P	Pole position
F	Fastest lap
Rider key
Colour	Meaning
Light blue	Rookie rider
