= Xavi Forés =

Spanish motorcycle racer (born 1985)

Javier Forés
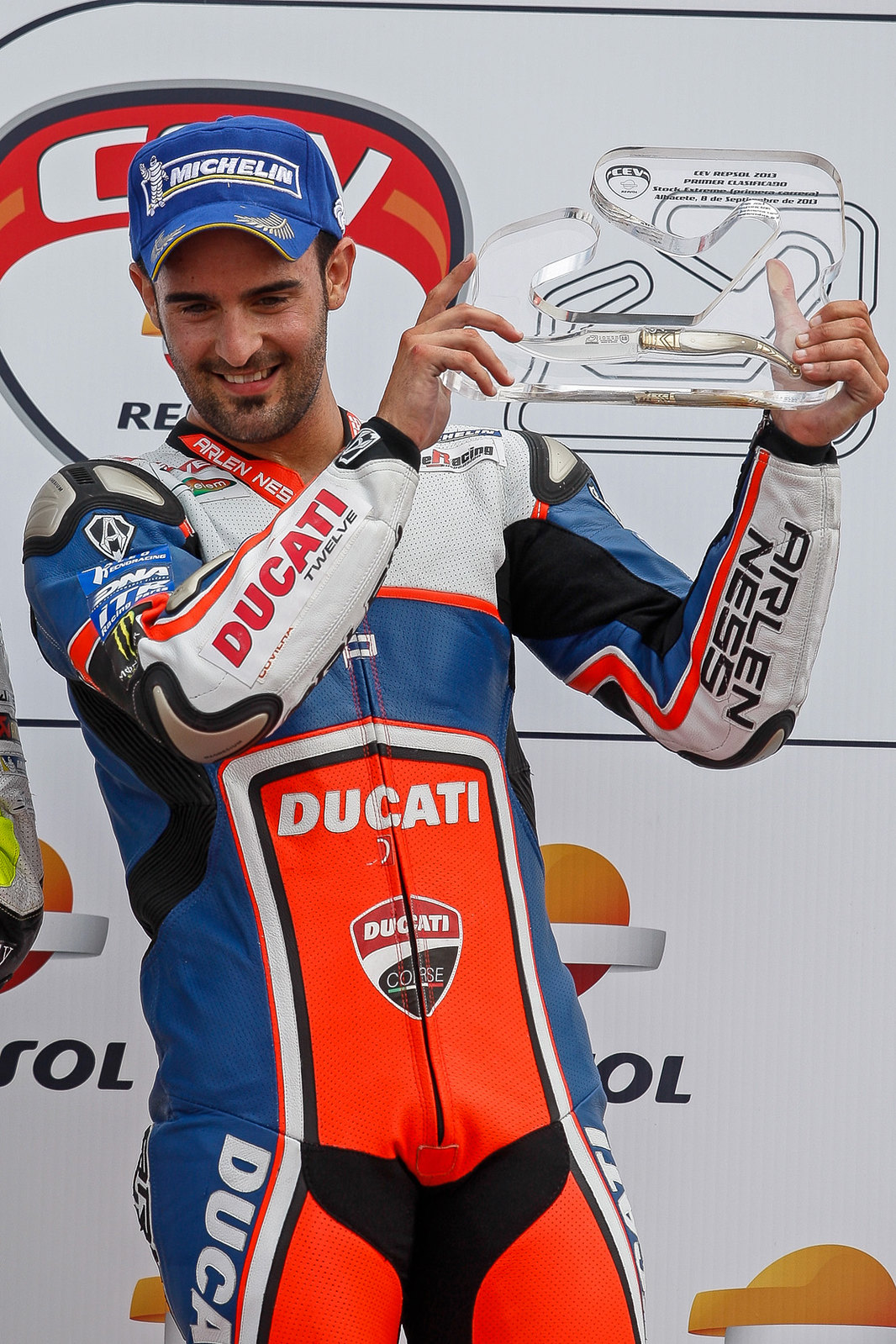
- Fores in 2013
- Nationality: Spanish
- Born: 16 September 1985 (age 41); Llombai, Spain
- Current team: Team GoEleven
- Bike number: 12
Motorcycle racing career statistics
MotoGP World Championship
| Active years | 2016 |
| Manufacturers | Ducati |
| Championships | 0 |
| 2016 championship position | NC (0 pts) |
Starts / Wins / Podiums / Poles / F. laps / Points; 1 / 0 / 0 / 0 / 0 / 0
Moto2 World Championship
| Active years | 2010–2011 |
| Manufacturers | Bimota, Suter |
| Championships | 0 |
| 2011 championship position | NC (0 pts) |
Starts / Wins / Podiums / Poles / F. laps / Points; 10 / 0 / 0 / 0 / 0 / 0
125cc World Championship
| Active years | 2001 |
| Manufacturers | Aprilia |
| Championships | 0 |
| 2001 championship position | NC (0 pts) |
Starts / Wins / Podiums / Poles / F. laps / Points; 1 / 0 / 0 / 0 / 0 / 0
MotoE World Championship
| Active years | 2022- |
| Manufacturers | Energica |
| Championships | 0 |
| 2022 championship position | 14th (35.5 pts) |
Starts / Wins / Podiums / Poles / F. laps / Points; 11 / 0 / 0 / 0 / 0 / 35.5
Superbike World Championship
| Active years | 2011, 2013–2018, 2020, 2022 |
| Manufacturers | BMW, Ducati, Kawasaki |
| Championships | 0 |
| 2022 championship position | 19th (33 pts) |
Starts / Wins / Podiums / Poles / F. laps / Points; 127 / 0 / 6 / 0 / 1 / 741
Supersport World Championship
| Active years | 2004–2007 |
| Manufacturers | Suzuki, Yamaha, Honda |
| Championships | 0 |
| 2007 championship position | 26th (23 pts) |
Starts / Wins / Podiums / Poles / F. laps / Points; 34 / 0 / 0 / 0 / 0 / 143
British Superbike Championship
| Active years | 2019, 2021 |
| Manufacturers | Honda, BMW, Ducati |
| Championships | 0 |
| 2021 championship position | 17th (52 pts) |
Starts / Wins / Podiums / Poles / F. laps / Points; 45 / 0 / 4 / 1 / 0 / 251
AMA Superbike Championship / MotoAmerica
| Active years | 2024– |
| Manufacturers | Suzuki |
| Championships | 0 |
| 2024 championship position | 12th (91 pts) |
Starts / Wins / Podiums / Poles / F. laps / Points; 16 / 0 / 1 / 0 / 0 / 91

Javier "Xavi" Forés Querol (born 16 September 1985) is a Spanish motorcycle road racer. For 2020, he competed in the Superbike World Championship aboard a Kawasaki ZX-10RR, and for 2021 in both British Superbike Championship for FHO Racing using BMWs, and FIM Endurance World Championship for BMW Motorrad World Endurance Team.

For 2022, Forés competed in World Superbikes as a replacement rider for Team Goeleven, in MotoE and Endurance racing with co-riders David Checa and Chaz Davies. At the end of the season, he was drafted into World Superbikes for the final three races after a brief spell with Eurosport as an expert pundit on World Superbike racing.

== Career ==
Forés won the 24 Hours of Catalunya in 2003 and 2005, the CEV Stock Extreme Championship in 2010 and 2013, the European Superstock 1000 Championship in 2013 and the IDM Superbike Championship in 2014.

Forés has also competed in the 125cc World Championship, the Supersport World Championship, the FIM Superstock 1000 Cup and the Moto2 World Championship. In 2019, he finished the British Superbike Championship in ninth position.

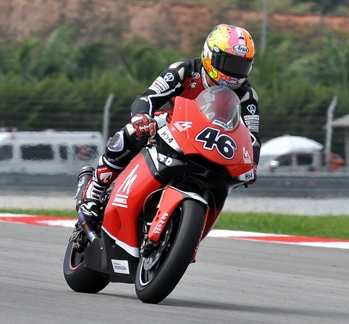
Forés at the 2010 Malaysian Grand Prix

=== World Superbike Championship ===
==== Bimota by Kawasaki Racing Team (2025-) ====
===== 2025 =====
Forés was appointed as Bimota test riders for the 2025 WorldSBK season, as the Italian factory looked to develop its new KB998 bike.

== Career statistics ==
=== FIM Superstock 1000 Cup ===
==== Races by year ====
(key) (Races in bold indicate pole position) (Races in italics indicate fastest lap)

| Year | Bike | 1 | 2 | 3 | 4 | 5 | 6 | 7 | 8 | 9 | 10 | Pos | Pts |
|---|---|---|---|---|---|---|---|---|---|---|---|---|---|
| 2009 | Kawasaki | VAL; 4 | NED; 4 | MNZ; 3 | SMR; 7 | DON; 4 | BRN; 2 | NŰR; 3 | IMO; 9 | MAG; 7 | ALG; 3 | 4th | 132 |

=== FIM CEV Stock Extreme ===
==== Races by year ====
(key) (Races in bold indicate pole position; races in italics indicate fastest lap)

| Year | Bike | 1 | 2 | 3 | 4 | 5 | 6 | 7 | 8 | 9 | Pos | Pts |
|---|---|---|---|---|---|---|---|---|---|---|---|---|
| 2013 | Ducati | CAT1; 1 | CAT2; 2 | ARA; 1 | ALB1; 1 | ALB2; 1 | **NAV**; 1 | **VAL1**; 3 | **VAL1**; 2 | **JER**; 2 | 1st | 201 |

=== IDM Superbike Championship ===
==== Races by year ====
(key) (Races in bold indicate pole position; races in italics indicate fastest lap)

| Year | Bike | 1 | 2 | 3 | 4 | 5 | 6 | 7 | 8 | 9 | 10 | 11 | 12 | 13 | 14 | 15 | 16 | Pos | Pts |
|---|---|---|---|---|---|---|---|---|---|---|---|---|---|---|---|---|---|---|---|
| 2014 | Ducati | LAU; 1 | LAU; 1 | BEL; 1 | BEL; 3 | OSC; 1 | OSC; 1 | NUR; 2 | NUR; 3 | **SCH**; 2 | **SCH**; 2 | NED; 1 | NED; C | **DTM**; 2 | **DTM**; 3 | **HOC**; 2 | **HOC**; 2 | 1st | 318 |

=== Grand Prix motorcycle racing ===
==== By season ====
| Season | Class | Motorcycle | Team | Race | Win | Podium | Pole | FLap | Pts | Plcd |
|---|---|---|---|---|---|---|---|---|---|---|
| 2001 | 125cc | Aprilia | CC Valencia Aspar | 1 | 0 | 0 | 0 | 0 | 0 | NC |
| 2010 | Moto2 | Bimota | Maquinza-SAG Team | 3 | 0 | 0 | 0 | 0 | 0 | NC |
| 2010 | Moto2 | AJR | Twelve Motorsport/Motorrad | 3 | 0 | 0 | 0 | 0 | 0 | NC |
| 2011 | Moto2 | Suter | Mapfre Aspar Team Moto2 | 7 | 0 | 0 | 0 | 0 | 0 | NC |
| 2016 | MotoGP | Ducati | Avintia Racing | 1 | 0 | 0 | 0 | 0 | 0 | NC |
| 2022 | MotoE | Energica | Octo Pramac MotoE | 11 | 0 | 0 | 0 | 0 | 35.5 | 14th |
| Total | | | | **23** | **0** | **0** | **0** | **0** | **35.5** | |

==== By class ====
| Class | Seasons | 1st GP | 1st Pod | 1st Win | Race | Win | Podiums | Pole | FLap | Pts | WChmp |
|---|---|---|---|---|---|---|---|---|---|---|---|
| 125cc | 2001 | 2001 Valencia | | | 1 | 0 | 0 | 0 | 0 | 0 | 0 |
| Moto2 | 2010–2011 | 2010 Malaysia | | | 10 | 0 | 0 | 0 | 0 | 0 | 0 |
| MotoGP | 2016 | 2016 San Marino | | | 1 | 0 | 0 | 0 | 0 | 0 | 0 |
| MotoE | 2022 | 2022 Spain | | | 11 | 0 | 0 | 0 | 0 | 35.5 | 0 |
| Total | 2001, 2010–2011, 2016, 2022 | | | | **23** | **0** | **0** | **0** | **0** | **35.5** | **0** |

==== Races by year ====
(key) (Races in bold indicate pole position; races in italics indicate fastest lap)

| Year | Class | Bike | 1 | 2 | 3 | 4 | 5 | 6 | 7 | 8 | 9 | 10 | 11 | 12 | 13 | 14 | 15 | 16 | 17 | 18 | Pos | Pts |
|---|---|---|---|---|---|---|---|---|---|---|---|---|---|---|---|---|---|---|---|---|---|---|
| 2001 | 125cc | Aprilia | JPN | RSA | SPA | FRA | ITA | CAT | NED | GBR | GER | CZE | POR | VAL; Ret | PAC | AUS | MAL | BRA | | | NC | 0 |
| 2010 | Moto2 | Bimota | QAT | SPA | FRA | ITA | GBR | NED | CAT | GER | CZE | INP | RSM | ARA | JPN | MAL; Ret | AUS; 25 | POR | | | NC | 0 |
| 2010 | Moto2 | AJR | | | | | | | | | | | | | | | | | VAL; 16 | | NC | 0 |
| 2011 | Moto2 | Suter | QAT; 26 | SPA; 18 | POR; 19 | FRA; 29 | CAT; Ret | GBR; 19 | NED; 23 | ITA | GER | CZE | INP | RSM | ARA | JPN | AUS | MAL | VAL | | NC | 0 |
| 2016 | MotoGP | Ducati | QAT | ARG | AME | SPA | FRA | ITA | CAT | NED | GER | AUT | CZE | GBR | RSM; Ret | ARA | JPN | AUS | MAL | VAL | NC | 0 |
| 2022 | MotoE | Energica | SPA1; 14 | SPA2; 11 | FRA1; 12 | FRA2; 13 | ITA1; 12 | ITA2; 12 | NED1; 12 | NED2; 15^{‡} | AUT1; 9 | AUT2; DNS | RSM1; 15 | RSM2; 15 | | | | | | | 14th | 35.5 |

^{‡} Half points awarded as less than two thirds of the race distance (but at least three full laps) was completed.

=== Supersport World Championship ===
==== Races by year ====
(key) (Races in bold indicate pole position; races in italics indicate fastest lap)

| Year | Bike | 1 | 2 | 3 | 4 | 5 | 6 | 7 | 8 | 9 | 10 | 11 | 12 | 13 | Pos | Pts |
|---|---|---|---|---|---|---|---|---|---|---|---|---|---|---|---|---|
| 2004 | Suzuki | SPA; Ret | AUS | SMR | ITA | GER | GBR | GBR | NED | ITA | FRA | | | | NC | 0 |
| 2005 | Suzuki | QAT; 8 | AUS; 11 | SPA; 11 | ITA; 11 | EUR; 12 | SMR; 7 | CZE; 5 | GBR; 11 | NED; 10 | GER; 14 | ITA; Ret | FRA; 5 | | 9th | 71 |
| 2006 | Yamaha | QAT; 4 | AUS; 15 | SPA; 7 | ITA; 9 | EUR; 7 | SMR; 10 | CZE; 12 | GBR; Ret | NED | GER | ITA | FRA | | 10th | 49 |
| 2007 | Honda | QAT; 11 | AUS; Ret | EUR; 17 | SPA; 17 | NED; 19 | ITA; Ret | GBR; 7 | SMR; 7 | CZE; 18 | GBR; 16 | GER; Ret | ITA; Ret | FRA; Ret | 26th | 23 |

=== British Superbike Championship ===
==== Races by year ====
(key) (Races in bold indicate pole position; races in italics indicate fastest lap)

| Year | Bike | 1 | | 2 | | 3 | | | 4 | | 5 | | 6 | | 7 | | 8 | | 9 | | | 10 | | 11 | | 12 | | | Pos | Pts |
| Year | Bike | R1 | R2 | R1 | R2 | R1 | R2 | R3 | R1 | R2 | R1 | R2 | R1 | R2 | R1 | R2 | R1 | R2 | R1 | R2 | R3 | R1 | R2 | R1 | R2 | R1 | R2 | R3 | Pos | Pts |
|---|---|---|---|---|---|---|---|---|---|---|---|---|---|---|---|---|---|---|---|---|---|---|---|---|---|---|---|---|---|---|
| 2019 | Honda | SIL; 10 | SIL; 7 | OUL; 16 | OUL; 17 | DON; 3 | DON; 2 | DON; 2 | BRH; 14 | BRH; 13 | **KNO**; 3 | KNO; 11 | SNE; 6 | SNE; 8 | THR; 7 | THR; 7 | CAD; 14 | CAD; 9 | OUL; 16 | OUL; 11 | OUL; 14 | ASS; 5 | ASS; 6 | DON; 7 | DON; 8 | BHGP; 8 | BHGP; 11 | BHGP; Ret | 9th | 199 |

| Year | Bike | 1 | | | 2 | | | 3 | | | 4 | | | 5 | | | 6 | | | 7 | | | 8 | | | 9 | | | 10 | | | 11 | | | Pos | Pts |
| Year | Bike | R1 | R2 | R3 | R1 | R2 | R3 | R1 | R2 | R3 | R1 | R2 | R3 | R1 | R2 | R3 | R1 | R2 | R3 | R1 | R2 | R3 | R1 | R2 | R3 | R1 | R2 | R3 | R1 | R2 | R3 | R1 | R2 | R3 | Pos | Pts |
|---|---|---|---|---|---|---|---|---|---|---|---|---|---|---|---|---|---|---|---|---|---|---|---|---|---|---|---|---|---|---|---|---|---|---|---|---|
| 2021 | BMW | OUL; DNS | OUL; DNS | OUL; DNS | KNO | KNO | KNO | BHGP; 13 | BHGP; 11 | BHGP; 11 | THR; 12 | THR; 13 | THR; Ret | DON; 14 | DON; 8 | DON; Ret | CAD; 14 | CAD; 12 | CAD; 13 | SNE; 12 | SNE; 16 | SNE; DNS | SIL; 9 | SIL; 18 | SIL; 14 | OUL | OUL | OUL | DON | DON | DON | BHGP | BHGP | BHGP | 17th | 52 |
| 2024 | Ducati | NAV | NAV | | OUL | OUL | OUL | DON | DON | DON | KNO | KNO | KNO | SNE | SNE | SNE | BRH | BRH | BRH | THR | THR | THR | CAD | CAD | CAD | OUL | OUL | OUL | DON | DON | DON | BRH; Ret | BRH; 19 | BRH; Ret | 24th | 12 |

=== Superbike World Championship ===
==== Races by year ====
(key) (Races in bold indicate pole position; races in italics indicate fastest lap)

| Year | Bike | 1 | | 2 | | 3 | | 4 | | 5 | | 6 | | 7 | | 8 | | 9 | | 10 | | 11 | | 12 | | 13 | | 14 | | Pos | Pts |
| Year | Bike | R1 | R2 | R1 | R2 | R1 | R2 | R1 | R2 | R1 | R2 | R1 | R2 | R1 | R2 | R1 | R2 | R1 | R2 | R1 | R2 | R1 | R2 | R1 | R2 | R1 | R2 | R1 | R2 | Pos | Pts |
|---|---|---|---|---|---|---|---|---|---|---|---|---|---|---|---|---|---|---|---|---|---|---|---|---|---|---|---|---|---|---|---|
| 2011 | BMW | AUS | AUS | EUR | EUR | NED | NED | ITA | ITA | USA | USA | SMR | SMR | SPA | SPA | CZE | CZE | GBR | GBR | GER | GER | ITA; Ret | ITA; 14 | FRA; 11 | FRA; 11 | POR; Ret | POR; 19 | | | 23rd | 12 |
| 2013 | Ducati | AUS | AUS | SPA | SPA | NED | NED | ITA | ITA | GBR | GBR | POR | POR | ITA | ITA | RUS | RUS | GBR | GBR | GER | GER | TUR | TUR | USA | USA | FRA | FRA | SPA; 9 | SPA; Ret | 30th | 7 |
| 2014 | Ducati | AUS | AUS | SPA | SPA | NED | NED | ITA | ITA | GBR | GBR | MAL | MAL | ITA | ITA | POR | POR | USA | USA | SPA | SPA | FRA; Ret | FRA; Ret | QAT | QAT | | | | | NC | 0 |
| 2015 | Ducati | AUS | AUS | THA | THA | SPA; 6 | SPA; 5 | NED; 7 | NED; 8 | ITA | ITA | GBR | GBR | POR | POR | ITA | ITA | USA | USA | MAL | MAL | SPA | SPA | FRA | FRA | QAT; 7 | QAT; DNS | | | 19th | 47 |
| 2016 | Ducati | AUS; Ret | AUS; DNS | THA; 14 | THA; Ret | SPA; 4 | SPA; 4 | NED; 13 | NED; 10 | ITA; 10 | ITA; 10 | MAL; 14 | MAL; 11 | GBR; 12 | GBR; 14 | ITA; Ret | ITA; 4 | USA; 7 | USA; 4 | GER; 10 | GER; 3 | FRA; 8 | FRA; 10 | SPA; Ret | SPA; Ret | QAT; 6 | QAT; 8 | | | 9th | 151 |
| 2017 | Ducati | AUS; 6 | AUS; 5 | THA; 11 | THA; 8 | SPA; Ret | SPA; 6 | NED; 4 | NED; 13 | ITA; 5 | ITA; 4 | GBR; 10 | GBR; 7 | ITA; 5 | ITA; Ret | USA; 5 | USA; 5 | GER; 8 | GER; 10 | POR; 9 | POR; 13 | FRA; Ret | FRA; 4 | SPA; 9 | SPA; 7 | QAT; Ret | QAT; 5 | | | 7th | 196 |
| 2018 | Ducati | AUS; 4 | AUS; 3 | THA; 2 | THA; 5 | SPA; 3 | SPA; Ret | NED; 5 | NED; 4 | ITA; 5 | ITA; 4 | GBR; Ret | GBR; Ret | CZE; 14 | CZE; 8 | USA; 6 | USA; 6 | ITA; 6 | ITA; Ret | POR; Ret | POR; 10 | FRA; 3 | FRA; 8 | ARG; 4 | ARG; 2 | QAT; 13 | QAT; C | | | 7th | 230 |

| Year | Bike | 1 | | | 2 | | | 3 | | | 4 | | | 5 | | | 6 | | | 7 | | | 8 | | | 9 | | | 10 | | | 11 | | | 12 | | | Pos | Pts |
| Year | Bike | R1 | SR | R2 | R1 | SR | R2 | R1 | SR | R2 | R1 | SR | R2 | R1 | SR | R2 | R1 | SR | R2 | R1 | SR | R2 | R1 | SR | R2 | R1 | SR | R2 | R1 | SR | R2 | R1 | SR | R2 | R1 | SR | R2 | Pos | Pts |
|---|---|---|---|---|---|---|---|---|---|---|---|---|---|---|---|---|---|---|---|---|---|---|---|---|---|---|---|---|---|---|---|---|---|---|---|---|---|---|---|
| 2020 | Kawasaki | AUS; Ret | AUS; 12 | AUS; 11 | SPA; 13 | SPA; 12 | SPA; 13 | POR; 13 | POR; 13 | POR; Ret | SPA; 8 | SPA; 12 | SPA; 11 | SPA; 13 | SPA; 16 | SPA; 13 | SPA; 13 | SPA; 12 | SPA; 15 | FRA; 8 | FRA; 12 | FRA; Ret | POR; 8 | POR; 10 | POR; 8 | | | | | | | | | | | | | 13th | 61 |
| 2022 | Ducati | SPA | SPA | SPA | NED | NED | NED | POR; 11 | POR; 9 | POR; 10 | ITA | ITA | ITA | GBR | GBR | GBR | CZE | CZE | CZE | FRA | FRA | FRA | SPA | SPA | SPA | POR | POR | POR | ARG; 12 | ARG; 12 | ARG; 13 | INA; 11 | INA; 11 | INA; 11 | AUS; 13 | AUS; 9 | AUS; Ret | 19th | 33 |

=== FIM Endurance World Championship ===
==== By year ====
(key) (Races in bold indicate pole position; races in italics indicate fastest lap)

| Year | Bike | (France) LE MANS | | | | (Portugal) ESTORIL | | | (France) BOL D'OR | | | | (Czech Republic) MOST | | Pos | Pts |
| Year | Bike | Grid | 8 Hrs | 16 Hrs | 24 Hrs | Grid | 8 Hrs | 12 Hrs | Grid | 8 Hrs | 16 Hrs | 24 Hrs | Grid | 6 Hrs | Pos | Pts |
|---|---|---|---|---|---|---|---|---|---|---|---|---|---|---|---|---|
| 2021 | BMW S1000RR | 3 | 6 | 7 | 28 | 4 | 7 | 25 | 3 | 1 | Ret | - | 4 | 45 | 2nd | 133 |

==== By team ====
| Year | Team | Bike | Rider | TC |
|---|---|---|---|---|
| 2021 | (Germany) BMW Motorrad World Endurance | BMW S1000RR | (Ukraine) Illia Mykhalchyk (Germany) Markus Reiterberger (France) Kenny Foray (Spain) Xavi Forés | 2nd |

=== MotoAmerica Supersport Championship ===
==== Races by year ====
| Season | Bike | Round | | | | | | | | | | | | | | | | Plcd. | Pts. |
| 2023 | Ducati | RAT (Georgia (U.S. state)) | | ALA (Alabama) | RAM (Wisconsin) | | RID (Washington (state)) | | MON (California) | BRA (Minnesota) | | PIT (Pennsylvania) | | AME (Texas) | | NJE (New Jersey) | | Plcd. | Pts. |
| 2023 | Ducati | R1 | R2 | EXT | R1 | R2 | R1 | R2 | EXT | R1 | R2 | R1 | R2 | R1 | R2 | R1 | R2 | Plcd. | Pts. |
|---|---|---|---|---|---|---|---|---|---|---|---|---|---|---|---|---|---|---|---|
| 2023 | Ducati | 1 | 1 | 1 | 1 | 1 | 1 | 1 | 1 | 7 | 4 | 2 | 2 | 1 | 2 | 9 | Ret | 1st | 364 |

=== MotoAmerica Superbike ===
==== Results ====
| Year | Class | Team | 1 | | 2 | | | 3 | | 4 | | 5 | | 6 | | 7 | | 8 | | | 9 | | Pos | Pts |
| Year | Class | Team | R1 | R2 | R1 | R2 | R3 | R1 | R2 | R1 | R2 | R1 | R2 | R1 | R2 | R1 | R2 | R1 | R2 | R3 | R1 | R2 | Pos | Pts |
|---|---|---|---|---|---|---|---|---|---|---|---|---|---|---|---|---|---|---|---|---|---|---|---|---|
| 2024 | SuperBike | Suzuki/Yamaha | ATL | ATL | ALA; 6 | ALA; Ret | ALA; 6 | RAM; Ret | RAM; 8 | BRA; Ret | BRA; Ret | RID; 3 | RID; 7 | MON; 7 | MON; 7 | OHI | OHI | TEX; Ret | TEX; 8 | TEX; Ret | NJR; 8 | NJR; 12 | 12th | 91 |
