= Péter Sebestyén =

Hungarian motorcycle racer

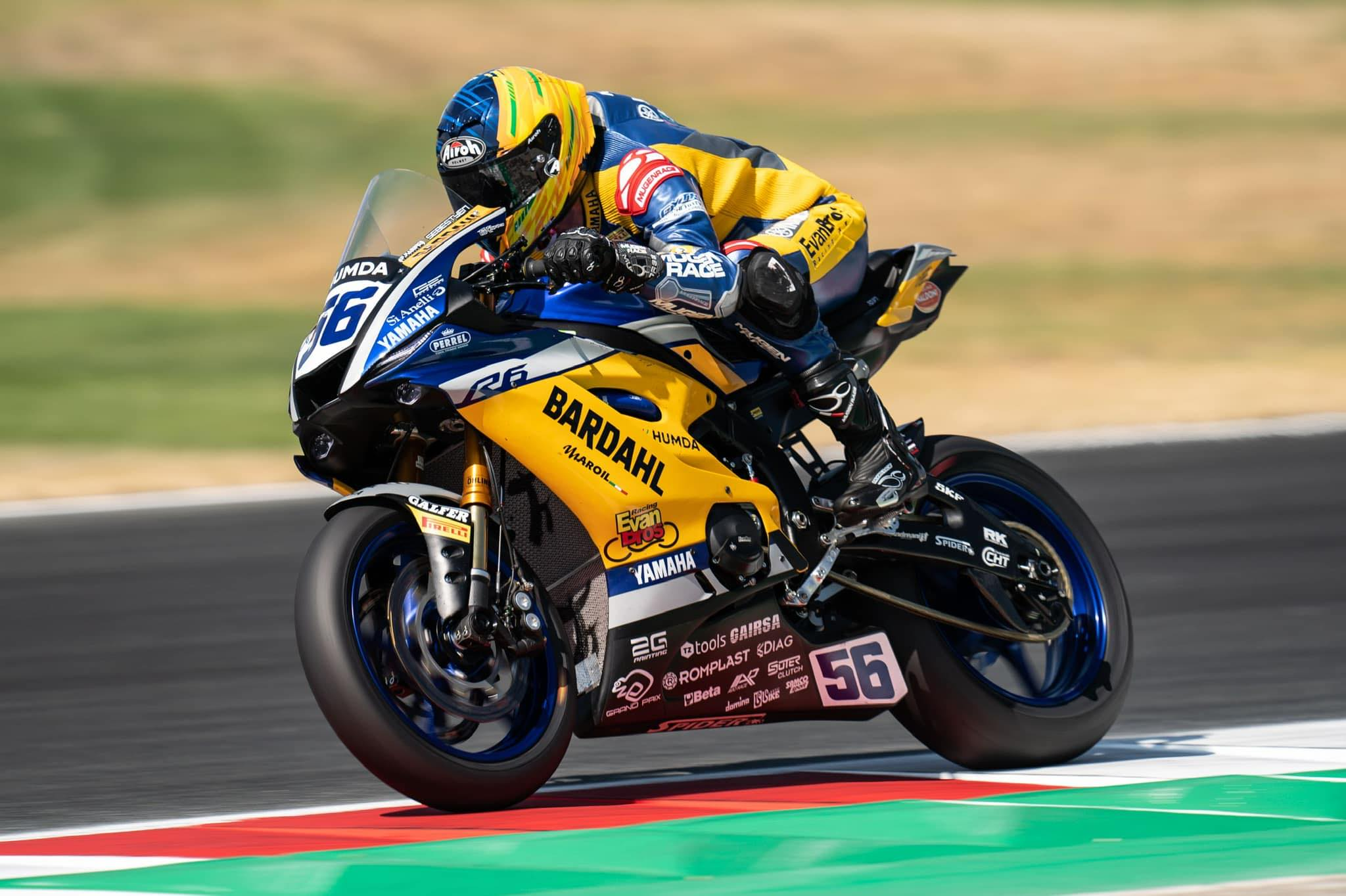
- Nationality: Hungarian
- Born: 16 May 1994 (age 32); Budapest, Hungary
- Current team: Evan Bros WorldSSP Yamaha Team
- Bike number: 56
Motorcycle racing career statistics
125cc World Championship
Active years	2010–2011
Manufacturers	Aprilia, KTM
Championships	0
2011 championship position	NC (0 pts)
Starts / Wins / Podiums / Poles / F. laps / Points; 13 / 0 / 0 / 0 / 0 / 0
Superbike World Championship
Active years	2014, 2016
Manufacturers	BMW, Yamaha
Championships	0
2016 championship position	33rd (1 pt)
Starts / Wins / Podiums / Poles / F. laps / Points; 31 / 0 / 0 / 0 / 0 / 1
Supersport World Championship
Active years	2017–present
Manufacturers	Kawasaki, Honda, Yamaha
Championships	0
2022 championship position	19th (40 pts)
Starts / Wins / Podiums / Poles / F. laps / Points; 83 / 0 / 0 / 0 / 0 / 233

Péter Sebestyén (born 16 May 1994) is a Hungarian motorcycle racer, who last competed in the 2022 Supersport World Championship for the Evan Bros Yamaha Team.

He has raced in the Superbike World Championship, the FIM Superstock 1000 Cup, the 2010 and 2011 125cc World Championships, the Spanish 125GP Championship, the German 125GP Championship, the European Junior Cup and the Red Bull MotoGP Rookies Cup.

He won the Hungarian Junior Championship in 2003 and the Republic of Hungary Scooter Championship in 2006.

== Career ==
Sebestyén entered the 2007 Red Bull MotoGP Rookies Cup aged only 13, and had to miss the first round of Spain in March, due to the minimum age requirement, as he would only turn 13 in May. He would race in rounds 2–8, scoring two point scoring finishes: a 13th place in Italy, and a 12th place in Germany. He finished the season 22nd in the standings, with seven points.

Sebestyén stayed for the 2008 Red Bull MotoGP Rookies Cup as well, this time scoring points in six races, including a sixth place in Britain, and an eighth place in Germany. He finished the season 15th in the rider's championship, with 28 points.

In 2009, after his best results included the German GP in both seasons in the Red Bull Rookies Cup, Sebestyén raced a full year in the German 125cc GP Championship, with moderate success.

In 2010, Sebestyén raced in the Spanish 125cc GP Championship, and performed well enough to earn himself three wild-card appearances in the 2010 125cc World Championship. He finished 23rd in Catalonia, retired in Aragon, and finished 17th in the season-closer at Valencia.

Sebestyén's wild-card results earned him a full ride for the 2011 125cc World Championship season, racing for Caretta Technology Forward Team. He struggled during the year, scoring no points, and a season's best finish of 18th in Valencia.

In 2012 and 2013, Sebestyén raced in the European Junior Cup by KTM. He scored no points in 2012, but finished in the points seven times out of eight races in 2013, including a second place in Magny-Cours. He ended the season sixth in the rider's championship, scoring 67 points.

== Career statistics ==
=== Career highlights ===
- 2012 - NC, European Junior Cup, KTM 690 Duke
- 2013 - 6th, European Junior Cup, Honda CBR500R
- 2015 - 29th, FIM Superstock 1000 Cup, Kawasaki ZX-10R

=== Red Bull MotoGP Rookies Cup ===
==== Races by year ====
(key) (Races in bold indicate pole position, races in italics indicate fastest lap)

Year	1	2	3	4	5	6	7	8	9	10	Pos	Pts
2007	SPA	ITA; 13	GBR; Ret	NED; 18	GER; 12	CZE; Ret	POR; 21	VAL; 21			22nd	7
2008	SPA1; 15	SPA2; 15	POR; 17	FRA; 11	**ITA**; Ret	GBR; 6	NED; 16	GER; 8	CZE1; 13	CZE2; NC	15th	28

=== Grand Prix motorcycle racing ===
==== By season ====
Season	Class	Motorcycle	Team	Race	Win	Podium	Pole	FLap	Pts	Plcd
2010	125cc	Aprilia	Right Guard Racing	3	0	0	0	0	0	NC
2010	125cc	Aprilia	Ongetta Team	3	0	0	0	0	0	NC
2011	125cc	KTM	Caretta Technology	10	0	0	0	0	0	NC
2011	125cc	Aprilia	Matteoni Racing	10	0	0	0	0	0	NC
Total				**13**	**0**	**0**	**0**	**0**	**0**	

==== Races by year ====
(key) (Races in bold indicate pole position; races in italics indicate fastest lap)

Year	Class	Bike	1	2	3	4	5	6	7	8	9	10	11	12	13	14	15	16	17	Pos	Pts
2010	125cc	Aprilia	QAT	SPA	FRA	ITA	GBR	NED	CAT; 23	GER	CZE	INP	RSM	ARA; Ret	JPN	MAL	AUS	POR	VAL; 17	NC	0
2011	125cc	KTM	QAT	SPA	POR; 23	FRA; 25	CAT; 22	GBR; Ret	NED; 20	ITA; Ret	GER; Ret	CZE; 26	INP; 22	RSM	ARA	JPN	AUS	MAL		NC	0
2011	125cc	Aprilia																	VAL; 18	NC	0

=== Superbike World Championship ===
==== Races by year ====
(key) (Races in bold indicate pole position; races in italics indicate fastest lap)

Year	Bike	1		2		3		4		5		6		7		8		9		10		11		12		13		Pos	Pts
Year	Bike	R1	R2	R1	R2	R1	R2	R1	R2	R1	R2	R1	R2	R1	R2	R1	R2	R1	R2	R1	R2	R1	R2	R1	R2	R1	R2	Pos	Pts
2014	BMW	AUS; DNQ	AUS; DNQ	SPA; 20	SPA; 18	NED; Ret	NED; DNS	ITA; 19	ITA; Ret	GBR; DNS	GBR; DNS	MAL; Ret	MAL; 19	ITA; 19	ITA; 19	POR; Ret	POR; DNS	USA; Ret	USA; DNS	SPA	SPA	FRA	FRA	QAT	QAT			NC	0
2016	Yamaha	AUS; 18	AUS; 18	THA; 20	THA; 20	SPA; 19	SPA; 20	NED; DNQ	NED; 19	ITA; Ret	ITA; DNS	MAL	MAL	GBR	GBR	ITA; 16	ITA; 18	USA; 17	USA; 16	GER; 18	GER; 16	FRA; 19	FRA; 18	SPA; 15	SPA; Ret	QAT; 20	QAT; 19	33rd	1

=== Superstock 1000 Cup ===
==== Races by year ====
(key) (Races in bold indicate pole position) (Races in italics indicate fastest lap)

Year	Bike	1	2	3	4	5	6	7	8	Pos	Pts
2015	Kawasaki	ARA; Ret	NED; 20	IMO; 13	DON; Ret	ALG; 23	MIS; 18	JER; 25	MAG; 20	29th	3

=== Supersport World Championship ===
==== Races by year ====
(key) (Races in bold indicate pole position; races in italics indicate fastest lap)

Year	Bike	1	2	3	4	5	6	7	8	9	10	11	12	13	14	15	16	17	18	19	20	21	22	23	24	Pos	Pts
2017	Kawasaki	AUS	THA	SPA; 19	NED; 24	ITA; 23	GBR; 25	ITA; 17	GER; 17	POR; 16	FRA; 21	SPA; Ret	QAT													NC	0
2018	Kawasaki	AUS	THA	SPA; 21	NED; 19	ITA; 17	GBR	CZE																		23rd	9
2018	Honda								ITA; 17	POR; Ret	FRA; 14	ARG; 15	QAT; 10													23rd	9
2019	Honda	AUS; 8	THA; 12	SPA; 11	NED; 12	ITA; 10	SPA; 10	ITA; 16	GBR; 11	POR; 11	FRA; 10	ARG; 11	QAT; 11													11th	59
2020	Yamaha	AUS; 12	SPA; Ret	SPA; DNS	POR; 12	POR; 11	SPA; Ret	SPA; 11	SPA; 7	SPA; 6	SPA; 20	SPA; 11	FRA; 9	FRA; Ret	POR; Ret	POR; Ret										13th	49
2021	Yamaha	SPA	SPA	POR	POR	ITA	ITA	NED; 11	NED; 12	CZE; 10	CZE; 18	SPA; Ret	SPA; 17	FRA; Ret	FRA; 10	SPA; 9	SPA; 15	SPA; C	SPA; 13	POR; 11	POR; 9	ARG; 7	ARG; 5	INA; 10	INA; 10	13th	76
2022	Yamaha	SPA; 14	SPA; Ret	NED; 22	NED; DNS	POR; 24	POR; 13	ITA; 12	ITA; 14	GBR; Ret	GBR; 16	CZE; 14	CZE; 11	FRA; 13	FRA; 20	SPA; Ret	SPA; 20	POR; 14	POR; Ret	ARG; 12	ARG; 12	INA; 13	INA; 22	AUS; 13	AUS; 13	19th	40
