= Kenny Foray =

French motorcycle racer (born 1984)

- Nationality: French
- Born: 2 August 1984 (age 42); Sèvres, France
- Current team: Tech3 E-Racing
- Bike number: 78
- Website: http://kennyforay.com/
Motorcycle racing career statistics
MotoE World Championship
Active years	2019
Manufacturers	Energica
Championships	0
2019 championship position	18th (11 pts)
Starts / Wins / Podiums / Poles / F. laps / Points; 6 / 0 / 0 / 0 / 0 / 11

Kenny Foray (born 2 August 1984) is a French motorcycle racer.

== Career ==
In 2007, Foray became champion of the French Supersport class with Triumph.

In 2009, Foray became champion of the Polish Supersport class.

In 2011, Foray won the 24 Hours of Catalunya.

In 2014, Foray won the World Endurance Championship with the Yamaha GMT94 team.

In 2017, Foray won both the French Superbike championship as well as repeating his feat of winning the Endurance World Championship.

In 2019, Foray entered the inaugural MotoE World Cup with Tech3. He finished in last place with 11 points.

== Personal life ==
Kenny has a twin brother Freddy Foray who is also a motorcycle racer in endurance racing.

== Career statistics ==
- 2008 - 13th, FIM Superstock 1000 Cup, Yamaha YZF-R1
- 2022 - 1st, French Superbike Championship (FSBK)
- 2023 - 1st, French Superbike Championship (FSBK)
- 2024 - 1st, French Superbike Championship (FSBK), BMW S1000RR
- 2025 - 1st, French Superbike Championship (FSBK)

=== FIM Superstock 1000 Cup ===
==== Races by year ====
(key) (Races in bold indicate pole position) (Races in italics indicate fastest lap)

Year	Bike	1	2	3	4	5	6	7	8	9	10	Pos	Pts
2008	Yamaha	VAL; 13	NED; 9	MNZ; 8	NŰR; 17	SMR; 10	BRN; 16	BRA; 23	DON; Ret	MAG; 8	ALG; 16	13th	32

=== Grand Prix motorcycle racing ===
==== By season ====
Season	Class	Motorcycle	Team	Race	Win	Podium	Pole	FLap	Pts	Plcd
2019	MotoE	Energica	Tech3 E-Racing	6	0	0	0	0	11	18th

==== Races by year ====
(key) (Races in bold indicate pole position; races in italics indicate fastest lap)

Year	Class	Bike	1	2	3	4	5	6	Pos	Pts
2019	MotoE	Energica	GER; 14	AUT; 11	RSM1; Ret	RSM2; 14	VAL1; 16	VAL2; 14	18th	11

=== FIM Endurance World Championship ===
==== By team ====
Year	Team	Bike	Rider	TC
2011	(France) GMT94	Yamaha YZF-R1	(France) Kenny Foray (France) Matthieu Lagrive (Spain) David Checa	3rd
2012	(France) GMT94	Yamaha YZF-R1	(France) Kenny Foray (France) Matthieu Lagrive (France) Gwen Giabbani (Spain) David Checa	3rd
2013	(France) GMT94	Yamaha YZF-R1	(Spain) David Checa (France) Kenny Foray (France) Matthieu Lagrive (France) Maxime Berger	2nd
2014	(France) Yamaha Racing - GMT 94 - Michelin	Yamaha YZF-R1	(Spain) David Checa (France) Mathieu Gines (France) Kenny Foray	1st
2015	(France) GMT 94	Yamaha YZF-R1	(France) Kenny Foray (Spain) David Checa (France) Mathieu Ginnes	2nd
2021	(Germany) BMW Motorrad World Endurance	BMW S1000RR	(Ukraine) Illia Mykhalchyk (Germany) Markus Reiterberger (France) Kenny Foray (Spain) Xavi Forés	2nd

Year	Team	Bike	Tyre	Rider	Pts	TC
2025	(Germany) ERC Endurance	BMW S1000RR	**D**	(Ukraine) Illia Mykhalchyk (France) Kenny Foray (Spain) David Checa	58*	5th*

=== Suzuka 8 Hours results ===
Year	Class	Team	Co-riders	Bike	Pos
2025	**EWC**	(Germany) ERC Endurance	(Ukraine) Illia Mykhalchyk (Spain) David Checa	BMW S1000RR	11th
2026	**EWC**	(Germany) ERC Endurance	(Germany) Marcel Schrötter (Germany) Jan-Ole Jähnig	BMW M1000RR	TBD
