= Niccolò Canepa =

Italian motorcycle racer (born 1988)

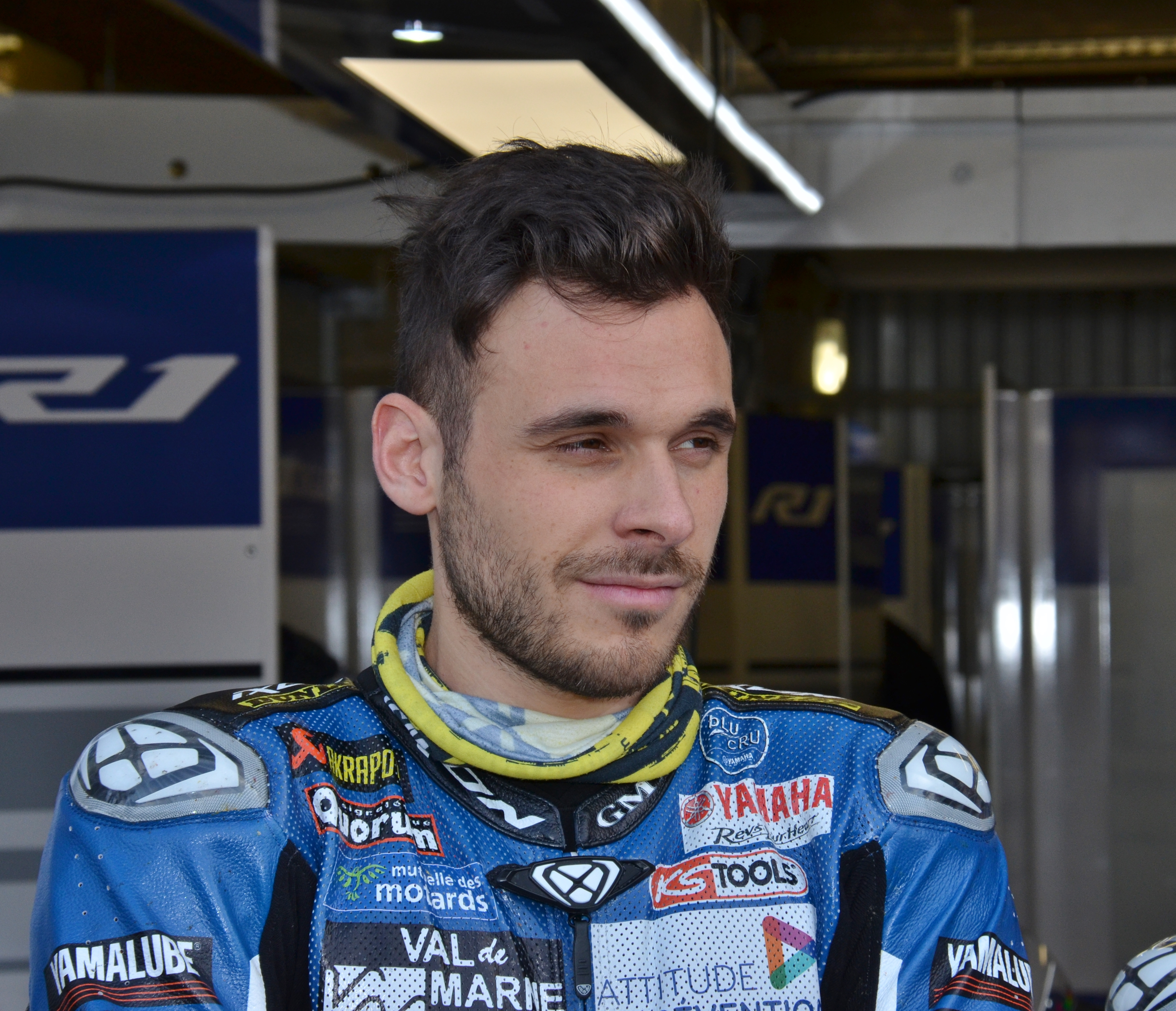
- Canepa at the Pré-Mans 2017
- Nationality: Italian
- Born: 14 May 1988 (age 38); Genoa, Italy
- Current team: WithU GRT RNF MotoE Team
- Bike number: 7
- Website: niccolocanepa59.com
Motorcycle racing career statistics
MotoGP World Championship
Active years	2009
Manufacturers	Ducati
Championships	0
2009 championship position	16th (38 pts)
Starts / Wins / Podiums / Poles / F. laps / Points; 14 / 0 / 0 / 0 / 0 / 38
Moto2 World Championship
Active years	2010
Manufacturers	Force GP, Suter, Bimota
Championships	0
2010 championship position	NC (0 pts)
Starts / Wins / Podiums / Poles / F. laps / Points; 11 / 0 / 0 / 0 / 0 / 0
MotoE World Championship
Active years	2019–
Manufacturers	Energica
Championships	0
2022 championship position	7th (94.5 pts)
Starts / Wins / Podiums / Poles / F. laps / Points; 25 / 0 / 1 / 0 / 0 / 191.5
Superbike World Championship
Active years	2008, 2012–2016, 2018
Manufacturers	Ducati, EBR, Kawasaki, Yamaha
Championships	0
2018 championship position	22nd (7 pts)
Starts / Wins / Podiums / Poles / F. laps / Points; 79 / 0 / 0 / 0 / 0 / 222.5

Niccolò Canepa (born 14 May 1988) is an Italian former professional motorcycle road racer contracted from 2022 to RNF Racing in the MotoE World Cup aboard an Energica Ego Corsa. Canepa won the 2007 European Superstock 1000 Championship on a Ducati, and spent 2008 as a tester of their MotoGP and World Superbike machines.

== Career ==
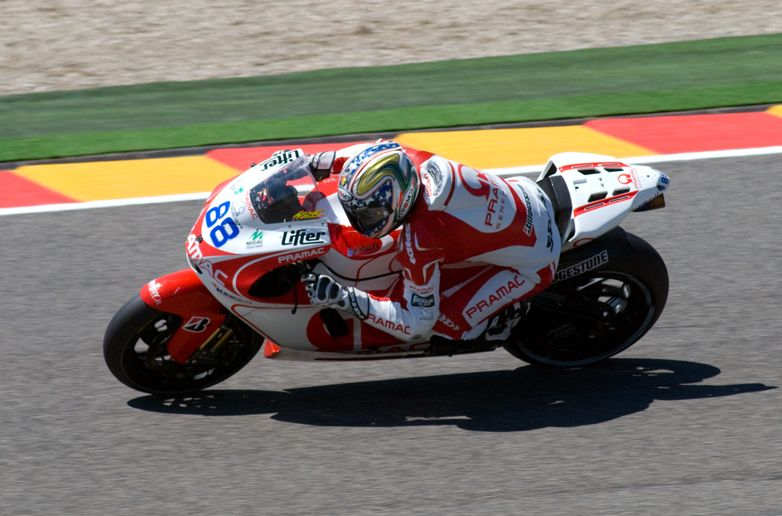
Canepa at the 2009 Italian Grand Prix

Canepa previously competed in the Italian Superstock Championship, the Italian Supersport Championship, and the Superstock 600 UEM European Championship, where he finished runner-up in 2006. He was given three World Superbike wild card rides in the second half of the 2008 season, qualifying on the second row for his debut at Brno, on his first experience of the one-shot "Superpole" system. He raced in MotoGP full-time for Pramac Ducati in 2009 with little success, and made an uncompetitive start in Moto2. He moved back to the Superstock 1000 FIM Cup in 2011, and after a season in the Superbike World Championship in 2012, returned to Superstock 1000 in 2013 and became runner up behind Sylvain Barrier.

In 2016, Canepa moved to the World Endurance Championship riding the Factory GMT94 Yamaha R1. He ended the season in second place.

In 2017, Canepa won the FIM Endurance World Championship (EWC). He is the first Italian in history to win an Endurance World Championship. He is also the Yamaha Superbike Factory Team test rider and replacement rider. He is also coaching Alex Lowes and Michael Van Der Mark during the Superbike World Championship.

Canepa retired from racing after the Italian Round of the 2024 Superbike World Championship. He initially announced his retirement before the 2024 Bol d'Or race, however he was called to race for the factory Yamaha team in Cremona, substituting for Jonathan Rea.

== Career statistics ==
=== Career highlights ===
- 2004 - NC, Superstock European Championship, Kawasaki ZX-10R
- 2005 - 4th, European Superstock 600 Championship, Kawasaki ZX-6R
- 2006 - 2nd, European Superstock 600 Championship, Ducati 749R
- 2007 - 1st, FIM Superstock 1000 Cup, Ducati 1098 S
- 2011 - 5th, FIM Superstock 1000 Cup, Kawasaki ZX-10R, Ducati 1098R
- 2013 - 2nd, FIM Superstock 1000 Cup, Ducati 1098
- 2016 - 19th, FIM Superstock 1000 Cup, Yamaha YZF-R1

=== CIV Championship (Campionato Italiano Velocita) ===
==== Races by year ====
(key) (Races in bold indicate pole position; races in italics indicate fastest lap)

Year	Class	Bike	1	2	3	4	5	6	Pos	Pts
2004	Stock 1000	Ducati	MUG	IMO	VAL1; 16	MIS; 14	VAL2; 16		26th	2
2005	Supersport	Kawasaki	VAL; 10	MON; 9	IMO; 10	MIS1; Ret	MUG; 12	MIS2; 4	9th	36

=== Superstock European Championship ===
==== Races by year ====
(key) (Races in bold indicate pole position) (Races in italics indicate fastest lap)

Year	Bike	1	2	3	4	5	6	7	8	9	Pos	Pts
2004	Kawasaki	VAL	SMR	MNZ	OSC	SIL	BRA	NED; 22	IMO; 17	MAG; 19	NC	0

=== European Superstock 600 ===
==== Races by year ====
(key) (Races in bold indicate pole position, races in italics indicate fastest lap)

Year	Bike	1	2	3	4	5	6	7	8	9	10	Pos	Pts
2005	Yamaha	VAL; 4	MNZ; 4	SIL; 4	MIS; 10	BRN; 2	BRA; 2	ASS; Ret	LAU; Ret	IMO; Ret	MAG; 2	4th	105
2006	Ducati	VAL; 2	MNZ; Ret	SIL; 1	MIS; 3	BRN; 2	BRA; 2	ASS; 1	LAU; 1	IMO	MAG	2nd	151

=== Supersport World Championship ===
==== By season ====
Season	Motorcycle	Team	Number	Race	Win	Podium	Pole	FLap	Pts	Plcd	WCh
2005	Kawasaki Ninja ZX-6R	Lightspeed Kawasaki	55	3	0	0	0	0	1	41st	–
Total				**3**	**0**	**0**	**0**	**0**	**1**		**0**

==== Races by year ====
(key) (Races in bold indicate pole position; races in italics indicate fastest lap)

Year	Bike	1	2	3	4	5	6	7	8	9	10	11	12	Pos	Pts
2005	Kawasaki	QAT	AUS	ESP	ITA	EUR	ITA	CZE	GBR	NED	GER; 16	ITA; 15	FRA; Ret	41st	1

=== FIM Superstock 1000 Cup ===
==== Races by year ====
(key) (Races in bold indicate pole position) (Races in italics indicate fastest lap)

Year	Bike	1	2	3	4	5	6	7	8	9	10	11	Pos	Pts
2007	Ducati	DON; 1	VAL; 3	NED; 6	MNZ; 10	SIL; 13	SMR; 5	BRN; 7	BRA; 1	LAU; 2	ITA; 2	MAG; 3	1st	161
2011	Kawasaki/Ducati	NED; 10	MNZ; 9	SMR; 5	ARA; 4	BRN; 5	SIL; 3	NŰR; 3	IMO; 3	MAG; 4	ALG; Ret		5th	109
2013	Ducati	ARA; 2	NED; 3	MNZ; 3	ALG; 5	IMO; 2	SIL; 4	SIL; 4	NŰR; 3	MAG; 2	JER; 7		2nd	154
2016	Yamaha	ARA	NED	IMO; 12	DON; 3	MIS	LAU	MAG	JER				19th	20

=== Superbike World Championship ===
==== By season ====
Season	Motorcycle	Team	Number	Race	Win	Podium	Pole	FLap	Pts	Plcd	WCh
2008	Ducati 1098	Ducati Xerox Team	59	2	0	0	0	0	3	32nd	–
2012	Ducati 1098	Red Devils Roma	59	19	0	0	0	0	42.5	20th	–
2013	Ducati 1199 Panigale	Team Ducati Alstare	59	4	0	0	0	0	12	24th	–
2014	Ducati 1199 Panigale	Althea Racing	59	24	0	0	0	0	73	13th	–
2015	EBR 1190RX; Kawasaki ZX-10R; Ducati 1199 Panigale	Team Hero EBR; Grillini SBK; Althea Racing	59	22	0	0	0	0	55	16th	–
2016	Yamaha YZF-R1	Pata Yamaha Official WorldSBK Team	59	4	0	0	0	0	30	19th	–
2016	Yamaha YZF-R1	Yamaha Motor Europe	94	4	0	0	0	0	7	22nd	–
Total				**79**	**0**	**0**	**0**	**0**	**222.5**		**0**

==== Races by year ====
(key) (Races in bold indicate pole position; races in italics indicate fastest lap)

Year	Bike	1		2		3		4		5		6		7		8		9		10		11		12		13		14		Pos	Pts
Year	Bike	R1	R2	R1	R2	R1	R2	R1	R2	R1	R2	R1	R2	R1	R2	R1	R2	R1	R2	R1	R2	R1	R2	R1	R2	R1	R2	R1	R2	Pos	Pts
2008	Ducati	QAT	QAT	AUS	AUS	SPA	SPA	NED	NED	ITA	ITA	USA	USA	GER	GER	SMR	SMR	CZE; 13	CZE; Ret	GBR	GBR	EUR	EUR	ITA	ITA	FRA	FRA	POR	POR	32nd	3
2012	Ducati	AUS; 20	AUS; 10	ITA; 10	ITA; Ret	NED; 8	NED; Ret	ITA; C	ITA; 17	EUR; 19	EUR; 11	USA; Ret	USA; Ret	SMR; 18	SMR; 13	SPA; 11	SPA; 17	CZE	CZE	GBR; Ret	GBR; 15	RUS; 7	RUS; Ret	GER; DNS	GER; DNS	POR	POR	FRA	FRA	20th	42.5
2013	Ducati	AUS	AUS	SPA	SPA	NED	NED	ITA	ITA	GBR; 13	GBR; 8	POR	POR	ITA	ITA	RUS	RUS	GBR	GBR	GER	GER	TUR	TUR	USA; Ret	USA; 15	FRA	FRA	SPA	SPA	24th	12
2014	Ducati	AUS; 10	AUS; 11	SPA; Ret	SPA; 11	NED; 10	NED; 10	ITA; Ret	ITA; Ret	GBR; 11	GBR; 11	MAL; Ret	MAL; 15	SMR; 12	SMR; 16	POR; 13	POR; 18	USA; 11	USA; Ret	SPA; 14	SPA; 15	FRA; 11	FRA; 10	QAT; 12	QAT; 12					13th	73
2015	EBR	AUS; Ret	AUS; DNS	THA; Ret	THA; DNS	SPA; 15	SPA; 18	NED; 15	NED; Ret																					16th	55
2015	Kawasaki									ITA; DNS	ITA; DNS	GBR; 15	GBR; Ret	POR; 17	POR; 17															16th	55
2015	Ducati															SMR; Ret	SMR; 12	USA; Ret	USA; 8	MAL; 9	MAL; 11	SPA; 17	SPA; 11	FRA; 10	FRA; 7	QAT; Ret	QAT; 8			16th	55
2016	Yamaha	AUS	AUS	THA	THA	SPA	SPA	NED	NED	ITA	ITA	MAL	MAL	GBR	GBR	ITA; 7	ITA; 9	USA; 10	USA; 8	GER	GER	FRA	FRA	SPA	SPA	QAT	QAT			19th	30
2018	Yamaha	AUS	AUS	THA	THA	SPA	SPA	NED	NED	ITA	ITA	GBR; 20	GBR; 18	CZE	CZE	USA	USA	ITA; 12	ITA; 13	POR	POR	FRA	FRA	ARG	ARG	QAT	QAT			22nd	7

=== Grand Prix motorcycle racing ===
==== By season ====
Season	Class	Motorcycle	Team	Number	Race	Win	Podium	Pole	FLap	Pts	Plcd	WCh
2009	MotoGP	Ducati Desmosedici GP9	Pramac Racing	88	14	0	0	0	0	38	16th	–
2010	Moto2	Force GP210	RSM Team Scot	59	11	0	0	0	0	0	NC	–
2010	Moto2	Suter MMX	RSM Team Scot	59	11	0	0	0	0	0	NC	–
2010	Moto2	Bimota HB4	M Racing	59	11	0	0	0	0	0	NC	–
2019	MotoE	Energica Ego Corsa	LCR E-Team	7	6	0	0	0	0	46	9th	–
2020	MotoE	Energica Ego Corsa	LCR E-Team	7	7	0	0	0	0	51	9th	–
2022	MotoE	Energica Ego Corsa	WithU GRT RNF MotoE Team	7	12	0	1	0	0	94.5	7th	–
Total					**50**	**0**	**1**	**0**	**0**	**229.5**		**0**

==== By class ====
Class	Seasons	1st GP	1st Pod	1st Win	Race	Win	Podiums	Pole	FLap	Pts	WChmp
MotoGP	2009	2009 Qatar			14	0	0	0	0	38	0
Moto2	2010	2010 Qatar			11	0	0	0	0	0	0
MotoE	2019–2020, 2022–present	2019 Germany	2022 France		25	0	1	0	0	191.5	0
Total	2009–2010, 2019–2020, 2022-present				**50**	**0**	**1**	**0**	**0**	**229.5**	**0**

==== Races by year ====
(key) (Races in bold indicate pole position; races in italics indicate fastest lap)

Year	Class	Bike	1	2	3	4	5	6	7	8	9	10	11	12	13	14	15	16	17	Pos	Pts
2009	MotoGP	Ducati	QAT; 17	JPN; 14	SPA; 16	FRA; 15	ITA; 9	CAT; 16	NED; 14	USA; 12	GER; 12	GBR; 8	CZE; 12	INP; Ret	RSM; 13	POR; 13	AUS; DNS	MAL	VAL	16th	38
2010	Moto2	Force GP	QAT; 27	SPA; Ret	FRA; 17	ITA; 28	GBR; 16	NED; 24	CAT; Ret	GER; 20										NC	0
2010	Moto2	Suter									CZE; 28	INP								NC	0
2010	Moto2	Bimota											RSM; 28	ARA; 26	JPN	MAL	AUS	POR	VAL	NC	0
2019	MotoE	Energica	GER; 12	AUT; 8	RSM1; 5	RSM2; 4	VAL1; 6	VAL2; Ret												9th	46
2020	MotoE	Energica	SPA; 13	ANC; 5	RSM; 11	EMI1; 6	EMI2; 4	FRA1; Ret	FRA2; 7											9th	51
2022	MotoE	Energica	SPA1; 11	SPA2; 9	FRA1; 8	FRA2; 3	ITA1; 6	ITA2; 6	NED1; 7	NED2; 5^{‡}	AUT1; Ret	AUT2; 12	RSM1; 6	RSM2; 6						7th	94.5

^{‡} Half points awarded as less than two thirds of the race distance (but at least three full laps) was completed.

=== FIM EWC ===
==== By year ====
(key) (Races in bold indicate pole position; races in italics indicate fastest lap)

Year	Bike	1	2	3	4	5	Pos	Total Pts
2016-17	Yamaha	BOL; 13	LMS; 58	OSC; 30	SVK; 30	SUZ; 15	1st	146

==== By team ====
Year	Team	Bike	Rider	TC
2016	(France) GMT94 Yamaha	Yamaha YZF-R1	(Italy) Niccolò Canepa (Spain) David Checa (France) Lucas Mahias	2nd
2016–17	(France) GMT94 Yamaha	Yamaha YZF-R1	(Italy) Niccolò Canepa (Spain) David Checa (France) Mike Di Meglio (France) Lucas Mahias	1st
2017–18	(France) GMT94	Yamaha YZF-R1	(Italy) Niccolò Canepa (Spain) David Checa (France) Mike Di Meglio	2nd
2018–19	Yamaha Austria Racing Team	Yamaha YZF-R1	(Germany) Marvin Fritz (Italy) Niccolò Canepa (Australia) Broc Parkes	4th
2019–20	Yamaha Austria Racing Team	Yamaha YZF-R1	(Germany) Marvin Fritz (Italy) Niccolò Canepa (Australia) Broc Parkes (Czech Republic) Karel Hanika (France) Loris Baz	2nd
2021	Yamaha Austria Racing Team	Yamaha YZF-R1	(Italy) Niccolò Canepa (Germany) Marvin Fritz (Czech Republic) Karel Hanika	6th
2022	Yamaha Austria Racing Team	Yamaha YZF-R1	(Italy) Niccolò Canepa (Germany) Marvin Fritz (Czech Republic) Karel Hanika	6th
2023	Yamaha Austria Racing Team	Yamaha YZF-R1	(Italy) Niccolò Canepa (Germany) Marvin Fritz (Czech Republic) Karel Hanika	1st
2024	Yamaha Austria Racing Team	Yamaha YZF-R1	(Italy) Niccolò Canepa (Germany) Marvin Fritz (Czech Republic) Karel Hanika	2nd

==== Spa 24 Hours Motos results ====
Year	Team	Riders	Bike	Pos
2023	Yamaha Austria Racing Team	(Germany) Marvin Fritz (Czech Republic) Karel Hanika	Yamaha YZF-R1	1st
2024	Yamaha Austria Racing Team	(Germany) Marvin Fritz (Czech Republic) Karel Hanika	Yamaha YZF-R1	1st

=== MotoAmerica SuperBike Championship ===
==== Results ====
Year	Class	Team	1		2		3		4		5		6		7		8			9			Pos	Pts
Year	Class	Team	R1	R2	R1	R2	R1	R2	R1	R2	R1	R2	R1	R2	R1	R2	R1	R2	R3	R1	R2	R3	Pos	Pts
2020	SuperBike	Yamaha	RAM	RAM	RAM	RAM	ATL	ATL	PIT	PIT	TRD	TRD	NJR	NJR	ALA	ALA	BRI	BRI	BRI	LGS; 6	LGS; 6	LGS; 6	18th	30

=== CIV National Championship ===
==== Races by year ====
(key) (Races in bold indicate pole position; races in italics indicate fastest lap)

Year	Class	Bike	1	2	3	4	5	6	7	8	9	10	11	12	Pos	Pts
2022	Superbike	Yamaha	MIS1; 3	MIS2; 2	VAL1; 2	VAL2; 3	MUG1; 3	MUG2; 3	MIS3	MIS4	MUG3	MUG4	IMO1	IMO2	6th	104

=== British Superbike Championship ===
Year	Bike	1			2			3			4			5			6			7			8			9			10			11			Pos	Pts
Year	Bike	R1	R2	R3	R1	R2	R3	R1	R2	R3	R1	R2	R3	R1	R2	R3	R1	R2	R3	R1	R2	R3	R1	R2	R3	R1	R2	R3	R1	R2	R3	R1	R2	R3	Pos	Pts
2023	Yamaha	SIL	SIL	SIL	OUL	OUL	OUL	DON	DON	DON	KNO	KNO	KNO	SNE	SNE	SNE	BRH	BRH	BRH	THR	THR	THR	CAD	CAD	CAD	OUL	OUL	OUL	DON; Ret	DON; 12	DON; 13	BRH; Ret	BRH; 16	BRH; 15	27th	9
