= Markus Reiterberger =

German motorcycle racer (born 1994)

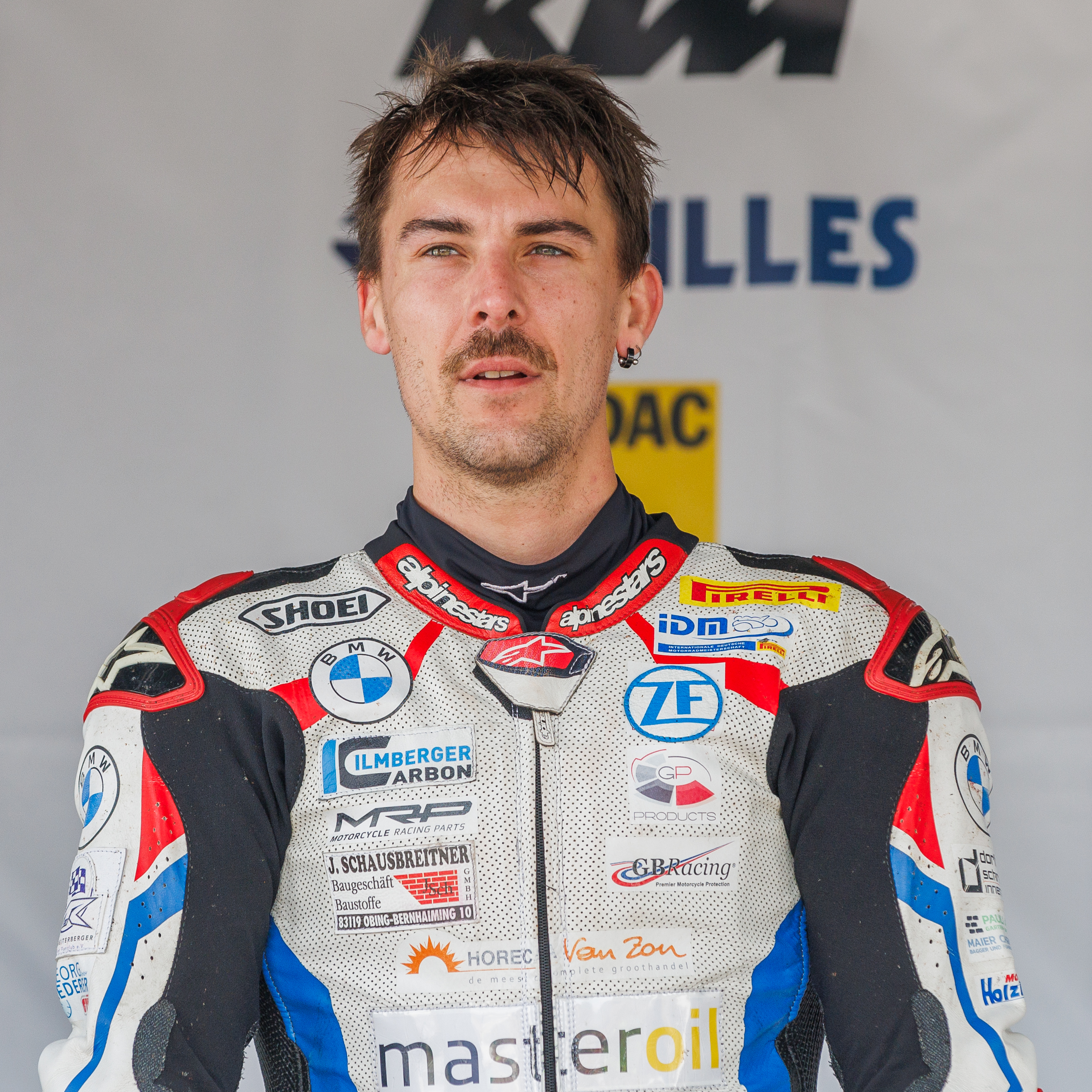
- Reiterberger in 2024
- Nationality: German
- Born: 9 March 1994 (age 32); Trostberg, Germany
- Current team: BMW Motorrad World Endurance Team
- Bike number: 28
- Website: markus-reiterberger.com
Motorcycle racing career statistics
Moto2 World Championship
Active years	2012
Manufacturers	MZ-RE Honda
Championships	0
2012 championship position	NC (0 pts)
Starts / Wins / Podiums / Poles / F. laps / Points; 1 / 0 / 0 / 0 / 0 / 0
Superbike World Championship
Active years	2013, 2015–2017, 2019, 2024
Manufacturers	BMW
Championships	0
2024 championship position	26th (3 pts)
Starts / Wins / Podiums / Poles / F. laps / Points; 75 / 0 / 0 / 0 / 0 / 210

Markus Reiterberger (born 9 March 1994) is a German motorcycle racer.

== Career ==
In 2007 and 2008, Reiterberger was a contestant of the Red Bull MotoGP Rookies Cup. In 2010, he was champion in the German Yamaha Cup and in 2013. In 2015 and 2017, he won the IDM Superbike Championship. In 2016, he was a regular rider of the Althea BMW Racing Team in the Superbike World Championship aboard a BMW S 1000 RR.

Reiterberger won the European Superstock 1000 Championship in 2018 aboard a BMW S 1000 RR. He returned to World Superbike in 2019 to again race a BMW S 1000 RR, this time for Shaun Muir Racing and with 2013 WSBK champion Tom Sykes as his teammate.

In 2020, Reiterberger competed in the Asia Road Racing Championship with Team Onexox TKKR SAG BMW.

== Career statistics ==
=== Career highlights ===
- 2011 - 8th, FIM Superstock 1000 Cup, BMW S1000RR
- 2012 - 6th, FIM Superstock 1000 Cup, BMW S1000RR
- 2013 - 17th, FIM Superstock 1000 Cup, BMW S1000RR
- 2013 - 1st, IDM Superbike, BMW S1000RR
- 2014 - 3rd, IDM Superbike, BMW S1000RR
- 2015 - 1st, IDM Superbike, BMW S1000RR
- 2017 - 1st, IDM Superbike, BMW S1000RR
- 2017 - 13th, European Superstock 1000 Championship, BMW S1000RR
- 2018 - 1st, European Superstock 1000 Championship, BMW S1000RR
- 2021 - 2nd, Endurance World Championship, BMW S1000RR
- 2022 - 1st, IDM Superbike, BMW S1000RR
- 2023 - 1st, ARRC Superbike, BMW S1000RR
- 2023 - 3rd, Endurance World Championship, BMW S1000RR
- 2024 - 3rd, Endurance World Championship, BMW S1000RR
- 2025 - 3rd, Endurance World Championship, BMW S1000RR
- 2026 - 1st, Endurance World Championship, BMW S1000RR

=== Red Bull MotoGP Rookies Cup ===
==== Races by year ====
(key) (Races in bold indicate pole position, races in italics indicate fastest lap)

Year	1	2	3	4	5	6	7	8	9	10	Pos	Pts
2007	SPA; 7	ITA; 8	GBR; 4	NED; 12	GER; 4	CZE; 14	POR; 15	VAL; 12			8th	55
2008	SPA1; 9	SPA2; 8	POR; 9	FRA; Ret	ITA; 8	GBR; 12	NED; 12	GER; 10	CZE1; 6	CZE2; 9	11th	61

=== Superstock 1000 Cup ===
==== Races by year ====
(key) (Races in bold indicate pole position) (Races in italics indicate fastest lap)

Year	Bike	1	2	3	4	5	6	7	8	9	10	Pos	Pts
2011	BMW	NED; 17	MNZ; 6	SMR; 19	ARA; 7	BRN; 4	SIL; 6	NŰR; 6	IMO; 6	MAG; 14	ALG; 11	8th	69
2012	BMW	IMO; 4	NED; 4	MNZ; 7	SMR; 10	ARA; 5	BRN; 13	SIL; 9	NŰR; 3	ALG; 9	MAG; 10	6th	91
2013	BMW	ARA	NED	MNZ	ALG	IMO	SIL	SIL	NŰR	MAG	JER; 5	17th	11

=== European Superstock 1000 Championship ===
==== Races by year ====
(key) (Races in bold indicate pole position) (Races in italics indicate fastest lap)

Year	Bike	1	2	3	4	5	6	7	8	9	Pos	Pts
2017	BMW	ARA	NED	IMO	DON	MIS	LAU	ALG	MAG	JER; 1	13th	25
2018	BMW	ARA; 1	NED; 1	IMO; 5	DON; 1	BRN; 4	MIS; 1	ALG; 3	MAG; 3		1st	156

=== Grand Prix motorcycle racing ===
==== Races by year ====
(key) (Races in bold indicate pole position, races in italics indicate fastest lap)

Year	Class	Bike	1	2	3	4	5	6	7	8	9	10	11	12	13	14	15	16	17	Pos	Pts
2012	Moto2	MZ-RE Honda	QAT	SPA	POR	FRA	CAT	GBR	NED	GER; 25	ITA	INP	CZE	RSM	ARA	JPN	MAL	AUS	VAL	NC	0

=== Superbike World Championship ===
==== Races by year ====
(key) (Races in bold indicate pole position; races in italics indicate fastest lap)

Year	Bike	1		2		3		4		5		6		7		8		9		10		11		12		13		14		Pos	Pts
Year	Bike	R1	R2	R1	R2	R1	R2	R1	R2	R1	R2	R1	R2	R1	R2	R1	R2	R1	R2	R1	R2	R1	R2	R1	R2	R1	R2	R1	R2	Pos	Pts
2013	BMW	AUS	AUS	SPA	SPA	NED	NED	ITA	ITA	GBR	GBR	POR	POR	ITA	ITA	RUS	RUS	GBR	GBR	GER; 13	GER; 12	TUR	TUR	USA	USA	FRA	FRA	SPA	SPA	32nd	7
2015	BMW	AUS	AUS	THA	THA	SPA	SPA	NED	NED	ITA	ITA	GBR	GBR	POR	POR	ITA; 16	ITA; 13	USA	USA	MAL	MAL	SPA	SPA	FRA; 21	FRA; 13	QAT	QAT			31st	6
2016	BMW	AUS; Ret	AUS; 8	THA; 5	THA; 7	SPA; 14	SPA; 15	NED; 7	NED; 16	ITA; 13	ITA; 12	MAL; Ret	MAL; 10	GBR; 11	GBR; 16	ITA; 6	ITA; Ret	USA	USA	GER; Ret	GER; Ret	FRA; 17	FRA; 12	SPA; 9	SPA; 14	QAT; Ret	QAT; 15			16th	82
2017	BMW	AUS; 12	AUS; 13	THA; 14	THA; 10	SPA; 12	SPA; 16	NED	NED	ITA	ITA	GBR	GBR	ITA	ITA	USA	USA	GER; 13	GER; 9	POR	POR	FRA	FRA	SPA	SPA	QAT	QAT			20th	29

Year	Bike	1			2			3			4			5			6			7			8			9			10			11			12			13			Pos	Pts
Year	Bike	R1	SR	R2	R1	SR	R2	R1	SR	R2	R1	SR	R2	R1	SR	R2	R1	SR	R2	R1	SR	R2	R1	SR	R2	R1	SR	R2	R1	SR	R2	R1	SR	R2	R1	SR	R2	R1	SR	R2	Pos	Pts
2019	BMW	AUS; 13	AUS; 12	AUS; 12	THA; 14	THA; 14	THA; 11	SPA; Ret	SPA; Ret	SPA; 15	NED; 6	NED; C	NED; 6	ITA; 10	ITA; 10	ITA; C	SPA; 11	SPA; 15	SPA; 12	ITA; 15	ITA; 13	ITA; 11	GBR	GBR	GBR	USA; 15	USA; 12	USA; 13	POR; 12	POR; 14	POR; 13	FRA; 16	FRA; 17	FRA; 15	ARG; 11	ARG; 17	ARG; 16	QAT; 8	QAT; 15	QAT; 14	14th	83
2024	BMW	AUS	AUS	AUS	SPA	SPA	SPA	NED	NED	NED	ITA	ITA	ITA	GBR	GBR	GBR	CZE	CZE	CZE	POR	POR	POR	FRA	FRA	FRA	ITA; 14	ITA; 16	ITA; 15	SPA	SPA	SPA	POR	POR	POR	SPA	SPA	SPA				26th	3

=== Asia Road Racing Championship ===
==== Races by year ====
(key) (Races in bold indicate pole position, races in italics indicate fastest lap)

Year	Bike	1		2		3		4		5		6		7		Pos	Pts
Year	Bike	R1	R2	R1	R2	R1	R2	R1	R2	R1	R2	R1	R2	R1	R2	Pos	Pts
2020	BMW	**MAL**; 4	MAL; 1													2nd	38
2023	BMW	CHA; 4	CHA; 6	**SEP**; 1	**SEP**; 1	SUG; 2	SUG; 1	**MAN**; 1	MAN; C	**ZHU**; 1	**ZHU**; 1	CHA; 2	CHA; 1			1st	228
2024	BMW	CHA; 6	CHA; 7													15th	19

=== British Superbike Championship ===
==== By year ====
Year	Bike	1			2			3			4			5			6			7			8			9			10			11			Pos	Pts
Year	Bike	R1	R2	R3	R1	R2	R3	R1	R2	R3	R1	R2	R3	R1	R2	R3	R1	R2	R3	R1	R2	R3	R1	R2	R3	R1	R2	R3	R1	R2	R3	R1	R2	R3	Pos	Pts
2020	BMW	DON	DON	DON	SNE	SNE	SNE	SIL	SIL	SIL	OUL	OUL	OUL	DON; 21	DON; 14	DON; 18	BHGP	BHGP	BHGP																23rd	2

=== FIM Endurance World Championship ===
==== By team ====
Year	Team	Bike	Rider	TC
2021	(Belgium) BMW Motorrad World Endurance Team	BMW S1000RR	(Germany) Markus Reiterberger (Ukraine) Illia Mykhalchyk (France) Kenny Foray (Spain) Javier Forés	2nd
2023	(Belgium) BMW Motorrad World Endurance Team	BMW S1000RR	(Germany) Markus Reiterberger (Ukraine) Illia Mykhalchyk (France) Jérémy Guarnoni	3rd
2024	(Belgium) BMW Motorrad World Endurance Team	BMW S1000RR	(Germany) Markus Reiterberger (Ukraine) Illia Mykhalchyk (France) Sylvain Guintoli	3rd

Year	Team	Bike	Tyre	Rider	Pts	TC
2025	(Belgium) BMW Motorrad World Endurance Team	BMW S1000RR	**B**	(Germany) Markus Reiterberger (South Africa) Steven Odendaal (France) Sylvain Guintoli	70*	2nd*

==== Spa 24 Hours Motos results ====
Year	Team	Riders	Bike	Pos
2022	(Belgium) BMW Motorrad World Endurance Team	(Ukraine) Illia Mykhalchyk (France) Jeremy Guarnoni	BMW S1000RR	1st

=== Suzuka 8 Hours results ===
Year	Class	Team	Co-riders	Bike	Pos
2025	**EWC**	(Germany) BMW Motorrad World Endurance Team	(Netherlands) Michael van der Mark (South Africa) Steven Odendaal	BMW M1000RR	5th
2026	**EWC**	(Germany) BMW Motorrad World Endurance Team	(Netherlands) Michael van der Mark (South Africa) Steven Odendaal	BMW M1000RR	TBD
