= David Checa =

Spanish motorcycle racer

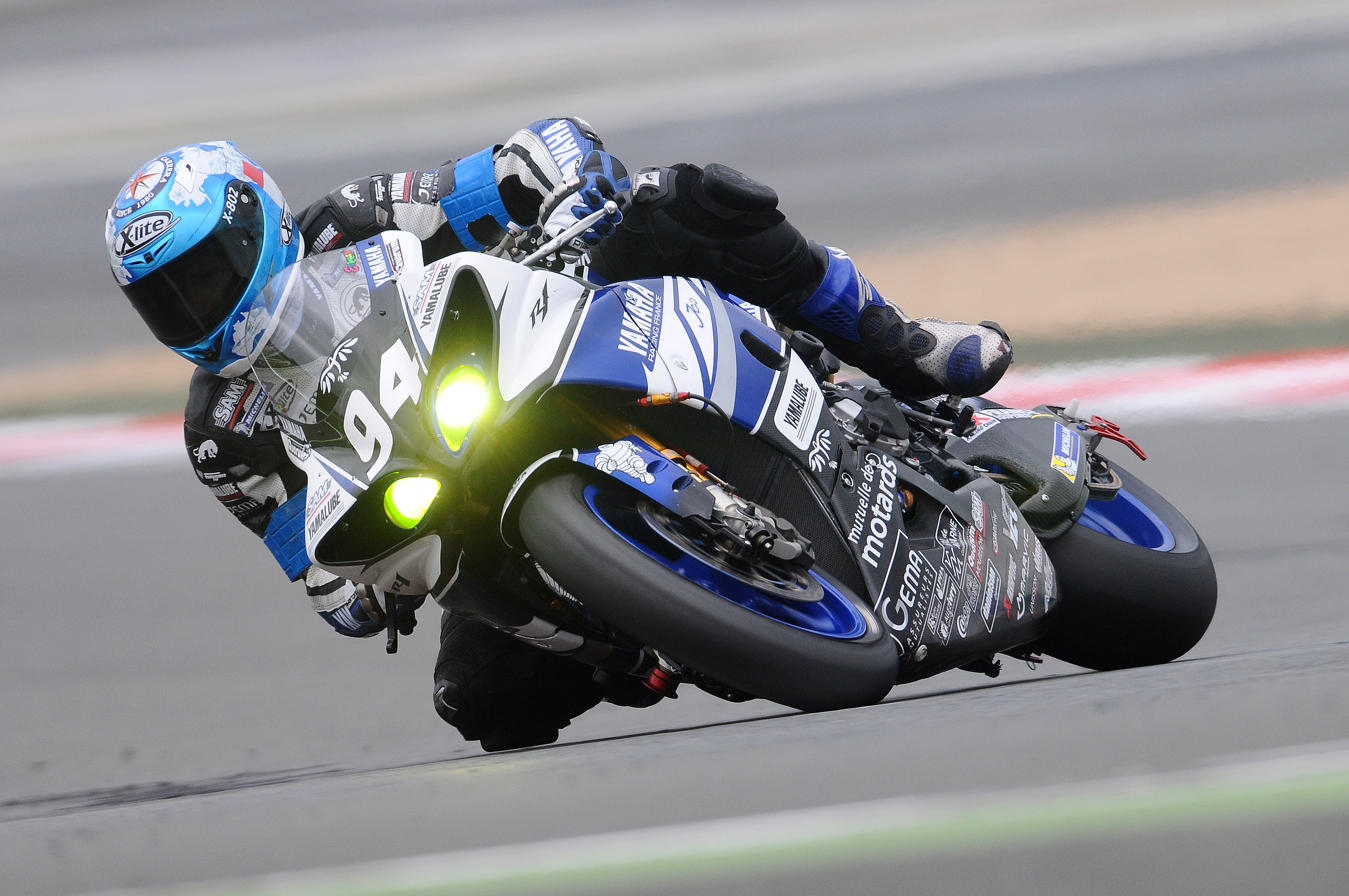
- David Checa in 2008
- Nationality: Spanish
- Born: 20 April 1980 (age 46); Sant Fruitós de Bages, Catalonia, Spain
- Current team: ERC Endurance
- Bike number: 6
Motorcycle racing career statistics
Grand Prix motorcycle racing
Active years	2000–2003, 2005
First race	2000 250cc South African Grand Prix
Last race	2005 MotoGP Dutch TT
Team(s)	TSR Honda, Honda, Yamaha, Aprilia
Championships	0
Starts / Wins / Podiums / Poles / F. laps / Points; 50 / 0 / 0 / 0 / 0 / 123
Superbike World Championship
Active years	2005, 2008 - 2009
Manufacturers	Yamaha
Championships	0
2009 championship position	37th (4 pts)
Starts / Wins / Podiums / Poles / F. laps / Points; 50 / 0 / 0 / 0 / 0 / 41
Supersport World Championship
Active years	1999, 2006 - 2007
Manufacturers	Ducati, Yamaha
Championships	0
2007 championship position	12th (50 pts)
Starts / Wins / Podiums / Poles / F. laps / Points; 32 / 0 / 0 / 0 / 6 / 95

David Checa Carrera (born 20 April 1980) is a Spanish professional motorcycle road racer. He currently competes in the FIM Endurance World Championship aboard a BMW M1000RR and the Alpe Adria Motorcycle Championship aboard a Yamaha YZF-R1. Checa is a four-time FIM Endurance World Champion, winning the title in 2004, 2014, 2016–17 and 2018–19.

Checa is a three-time winner of the 24 Hours Moto of Le Mans endurance race, in 2005 and 2017 with Yamaha, and in 2019 with Kawasaki. He also won the Bol d'Or 24-hour motorcycle endurance race twice on Circuit Paul Ricard, both in 2007 and 2017 with Yamaha. In 2016, Checa was the French Superbike Champion. He has previously competed in the Superbike World Championship for two years, in 2005, 2008, and 2009.

== Career ==
=== Early years ===
Born in Sant Fruitós de Bages, Barcelona, Spain, Checa began racing since 1996, contesting Superbike World Championship and Supersport World Championship races at home and in Europe. He spent 2000-2002 racing in the 250cc World Championship with a best overall finish of 13th before moving to Endurance World Championship. He was Pirelli's main tester for their Superbike World Championship control tyre in 2005, also doing a few races. He signed up for the Supersport World Championship Le Mans 24 winner and master endurance winner in 2005 and three races in MotoGP in place of injured Toni Elias. In 2006, despite suffering a broken wrist during pre-season testing, he finished 11th overall. He continued in the Supersport World Championship for 2007 finishing 12th overall. He also won the 2007 Bol d'Or 24-hour endurance race.

=== Superbike World Championship ===
Checa raced in the World Superbike Championship for two years, without a great deal of success collecting only a handful of points in each season.

== Personal life ==
Checa is the brother of motorcycle rider Carlos Checa.

== Career statistics ==
=== Supersport World Championship ===
==== Races by year ====
(key) (Races in bold indicate pole position, races in italics indicate fastest lap)

Year	Bike	1	2	3	4	5	6	7	8	9	10	11	12	13	Pos	Pts
1999	Ducati	RSA; 17	GBR; 20	SPA; 18	ITA; Ret	GER; 17	SMR; 25	USA; 19	EUR; Ret	AUT; DNQ	NED; 15	GER; 17			46th	1
2006	Yamaha	QAT	AUS	SPA	ITA; 13	EUR; 11	SMR; 4	CZE; 8	GBR; 21	NED; Ret	GER; Ret	ITA; 12	FRA; 5		11th	44
2007	Yamaha	QAT; 23	AUS; 18	EUR; 9	SPA; 14	NED; 7	ITA; 14	GBR; Ret	SMR; Ret	CZE; 7	GBR; 17	GER; 6	ITA; 15	FRA; 6	12th	50

=== Grand Prix motorcycle racing ===
==== Races by year ====
(key) (Races in bold indicate pole position, races in italics indicate fastest lap)

Year	Class	Bike	1	2	3	4	5	6	7	8	9	10	11	12	13	14	15	16	17	Pos	Pts
2000	250cc	TSR Honda	RSA; 16	MAL; Ret	JPN; 23	SPA; 18	FRA; Ret	ITA; 13	CAT; 13	NED; 15	GBR; 9	GER; 19	CZE; 13	POR; Ret	VAL; 10	BRA; Ret	PAC; 15	AUS; 20		19th	24
2001	250cc	Honda	JPN; 16	RSA; 13	SPA; 16	FRA; 16	ITA; 7	CAT; 16	NED; Ret	GBR; 11	GER; Ret	CZE; 18	POR; 8	VAL; 11	PAC; 12	AUS; Ret	MAL; 15	BRA; 22		17th	35
2002	250cc	Aprilia	JPN	RSA; 10	SPA; Ret	FRA; 10	ITA; 10	CAT; 12	NED; 16	GBR; 15	GER; 15	CZE; 18	POR; 8	BRA; 12	PAC; 21	MAL; 10	AUS; 8	VAL; 6		13th	60
2005	MotoGP	Yamaha	SPA	POR	CHN	FRA	ITA; 19	CAT; 13	NED; 15	USA	GBR	GER	CZE	JPN	MAL	QAT	AUS	TUR	VAL	26th	4

=== Superbike World Championship ===
==== Races by year ====
(key) (Races in bold indicate pole position) (Races in italics indicate fastest lap)

Year	Bike	1		2		3		4		5		6		7		8		9		10		11		12		13		14		Pos	Pts
Year	Bike	R1	R2	R1	R2	R1	R2	R1	R2	R1	R2	R1	R2	R1	R2	R1	R2	R1	R2	R1	R2	R1	R2	R1	R2	R1	R2	R1	R2	Pos	Pts
2005	Yamaha	QAT	QAT	AUS	AUS	SPA; 10	SPA; 9	ITA	ITA	EUR	EUR	SMR	SMR	CZE; 15	CZE; 14	GBR	GBR	NED	NED	GER	GER	ITA	ITA	FRA; 11	FRA; 12					21st	25
2008	Yamaha	QAT; 23	QAT; Ret	AUS; Ret	AUS; 12	SPA; 15	SPA; 18	NED; Ret	NED; DNS	ITA	ITA	USA; Ret	USA; DNS	GER; Ret	GER; 15	SMR; 15	SMR; 16	CZE; Ret	CZE; 16	GBR; 17	GBR; 20	EUR; 11	EUR; Ret	ITA; 17	ITA; 20	FRA; Ret	FRA; Ret	POR; 20	POR; 22	28th	12
2009	Yamaha	QAT	QAT	AUS	AUS	SPA; Ret	SPA; 20	NED; 19	NED; Ret	ITA; 22	ITA; 19	RSA	RSA	USA	USA	SMR; 21	SMR; Ret	GBR; 24	GBR; Ret	CZE; 18	CZE; 19	GER; Ret	GER; 18	ITA; 17	ITA; Ret	FRA; 15	FRA; 17	POR; 14	POR; 15	37th	4

=== FIM World Endurance Championship ===
==== By team ====
Year	Team	Bike	Rider	TC
2003	(France) Yamaha - GMT94	Yamaha YZF-R1	(France) William Costes (France) Sebastien Gimbert (France) Christophe Guyot (Spain) David Checa (France) Sebastien Scarnato	3rd
2004	(France) GMT94	Yamaha YZF-R1	(France) William Costes (France) Sebastien Gimbert (France) Christophe Guyot (Spain) David Checa	1st
2011	(France) GMT94	Yamaha YZF-R1	(France) Kenny Foray (France) Matthieu Lagrive (Spain) David Checa	3rd
2012	(France) GMT94	Yamaha YZF-R1	(France) Kenny Foray (France) Matthieu Lagrive (France) Gwen Giabbani (Spain) David Checa	3rd
2013	(France) GMT94	Yamaha YZF-R1	(Spain) David Checa (France) Kenny Foray (France) Matthieu Lagrive (France) Maxime Berger	2nd
2014	(France) Yamaha Racing - GMT 94 - Michelin	Yamaha YZF-R1	(Spain) David Checa (France) Mathieu Gines (France) Kenny Foray	1st
2015	(France) GMT 94	Yamaha YZF-R1	(France) Kenny Foray (Spain) David Checa (France) Mathieu Ginnes	2nd
2016	(France) GMT94 Yamaha	Yamaha YZF-R1	(Italy) Niccolò Canepa (Spain) David Checa (France) Lucas Mahias	2nd
2016–17	(France) GMT94 Yamaha	Yamaha YZF-R1	(Italy) Niccolò Canepa (Spain) David Checa (France) Mike Di Meglio (France) Lucas Mahias	1st
2017–18	(France) GMT94	Yamaha YZF-R1	(Italy) Niccolò Canepa (Spain) David Checa (France) Mike Di Meglio	2nd
2018–19	(Japan) Team SRC Kawasaki France	Kawasaki ZX-10R	(France) Jérémy Guarnoni (Spain) David Checa (France) Erwan Nigon (France) Randy de Puniet	1st
2021	(France) Webike SRC Kawasaki	Kawasaki ZX-10R	(Spain) David Checa (France) Jérémy Guarnoni (France) Erwan Nigon	3rd

Year	Team	Bike	Tyre	Rider	Pts	TC
2025	(Germany) ERC Endurance	BMW S1000RR	**D**	(Ukraine) Illia Mykhalchyk (France) Kevin Foray (Spain) David Checa	58*	5th*

=== Suzuka 8 Hours results ===
Year	Team	Riders	Bike	Pos
2025	(Belgium) ERC Endurance	(Ukraine) Illia Mykhalchyk (France) Kenny Foray (Spain) David Checa	BMW S1000RR	11th
