= 2013 European Junior Cup =

2013 European Junior Cup
Previous:	2012	Next:	2014
Support series: Superbike World Championship; Supersport World Championship; FIM Superstock 1000 Cup; European Superstock 600 Championship

The 2013 European Junior Cup was the third season of the European Junior Cup, and the first to use Honda CBR500R bikes after using KTM 690 Duke bikes in 2012.

The series featured two female riders this year, Amélie Démoulin of France and Sabrina Paiuta of Brazil. The title was won by Jake Lewis from New Zealand.

== Entry list ==
No.	Rider	Rounds
2	(Hungary) Richárd Bódis	All
3	(Italy) Andrea Zanella	1–7
4	(Italy) Alex Magliocchetti	1–3
5	(France) Guillaume Raymond	1–7
7	(United States) Alex Wisdom	All
8	(Spain) Mika Pérez	8
9	(France) Amélie Démoulin	All
10	(Belgium) Charly Ebehard	All
11	(Spain) Albert Arenas	1
12	(Indonesia) Ali Rusmiputro	1–4, 6–8
15	(Germany) Michael Gerstacker	6
17	(United Kingdom) James Flitcroft	All
18	(France) Rénald Castillon	7
19	(Italy) Riccardo Filippini	All
21	(Germany) Marcel Schultheiss	All
24	(New Zealand) Sam Croft	All
25	(Sweden) Jesper Hubner	All
27	(Spain) Javier Orellana	All
29	(New Zealand) Jake Lewis	All
31	(Italy) Matteo Ferrari	3
33	(France) Robin Anne	All
34	(Switzerland) Adrien Pittet	1–6
35	(United Kingdom) Stefan Hill	All
37	(Spain) Augusto Fernández	All
38	(Estonia) Hannes Soomer	1–7
41	(Norway) Stinius Viking Ødegård	All
43	(Italy) Kevin Manfredi	All
53	(Spain) Illán Fernández	All
55	(Ukraine) Ilya Mykhalchyk	All
56	(Hungary) Péter Sebestyén	All
59	(United Kingdom) Blayes Heaven	All
61	(Italy) Alessandro Zaccone	4
64	(Netherlands) Bo Bendsneyder	2, 6
65	(New Zealand) Tyler Lincoln	8
69	(United Kingdom) Joshua Harland	All
70	(Spain) Josué Moreno	8
71	(United Kingdom) Carl Stevens	5
74	(Netherlands) Jaimie van Sikkelerus	8
76	(Finland) Valter Patronen	7–8
77	(Spain) Miguel Aranda	All
78	(Italy) Lorenzo Garofoli	1–3
87	(Australia) Zac Levy	1–6
88	(Brazil) Sabrina Paiuta	1–3, 5–8
89	(United Kingdom) Fraser Rogers	5
93	(United States) Chris Kosan	All
97	(Italy) Michael Canducci	All
99	(New Zealand) Connor London	All

== Race calendar and results ==
Round	Country	Circuit	Date	Pole position	Fastest lap	Winning rider
1	Spain	MotorLand Aragón	14 April	(Spain) Albert Arenas	(Italy) Michael Canducci	(New Zealand) Jake Lewis
2	Netherlands	TT Circuit Assen	28 April	(France) Guillaume Raymond	(Spain) Illán Fernández	(Netherlands) Bo Bendsneyder
3	Italy	Autodromo Nazionale Monza	12 May	(France) Guillaume Raymond	(France) Guillaume Raymond	(France) Robin Anne
4	Italy	Autodromo Enzo e Dino Ferrari	30 June	(France) Guillaume Raymond	(Estonia) Hannes Soomer	(France) Guillaume Raymond
5	United Kingdom	Silverstone Circuit	4 August	(France) Guillaume Raymond	(Sweden) Jesper Hubner	(New Zealand) Jake Lewis
6	Germany	Nürburgring	1 September	(New Zealand) Jake Lewis	(Hungary) Richárd Bódis	(Netherlands) Bo Bendsneyder
7	France	Circuit de Nevers Magny-Cours	6 October	(United Kingdom) Joshua Harland	(Spain) Javier Orellana	(Spain) Augusto Fernández
8	Spain	Circuito de Jerez	20 October	(Spain) Augusto Fernández	(New Zealand) Jake Lewis	(New Zealand) Jake Lewis

== Championship standings ==
Pos.	Rider	ARA (Spain)	ASS (Netherlands)	MNZ (Italy)	IMO (Italy)	SIL (United Kingdom)	NÜR (Germany)	MAG (France)	JER (Spain)	Pts
1	(New Zealand) Jake Lewis	1	Ret	3	Ret	1	**6**	Ret	1	101
2	(Spain) Augusto Fernández	19	2	Ret	3	6	Ret	1	**2**	91
3	(France) Robin Anne	11	8	1	9	5	3	Ret	20	72
4	(Italy) Kevin Manfredi	9	5	Ret	11	9	2	9	5	68
5	(Italy) Michael Canducci	3	3	5	13	7	Ret	Ret	4	68
6	(Hungary) Péter Sebestyén	8	4	12	6	Ret	11	2	9	67
7	(United Kingdom) James Flitcroft	18	14	6	4	2	5	22	7	65
8	(Spain) Javier Orellana	14	9	Ret	7	4	7	3	8	64
9	(France) Guillaume Raymond	4	**6**	**26**	**1**	**8**	13	Ret		59
10	(Netherlands) Bo Bendsneyder		1				1			50
11	(United Kingdom) Joshua Harland	Ret	13	8	Ret	10	4	**17**	3	46
12	(Hungary) Richárd Bódis	17	Ret	Ret	2	3	Ret	Ret	10	42
13	(Switzerland) Adrien Pittet	Ret	7	2	Ret	Ret	8			37
14	(Spain) Illán Fernández	5	10	Ret	5	Ret	Ret	19	13	31
15	(Australia) Zac Levy	6	20	4	16	12	Ret			27
16	(Sweden) Jesper Hubner	20	Ret	24	12	11	14	5	Ret	22
17	(Indonesia) Ali Rusmiputro	7	Ret	10	10		15	20	17	22
18	(Spain) Albert Arenas	**2**								20
19	(Spain) Miguel Aranda	12	15	19	15	18	Ret	7	11	20
20	(Ukraine) Ilya Mykhalchyk	10	11	14	Ret	14	19	Ret	12	19
21	(Brazil) Sabrina Paiuta	13	Ret	13		21	16	6	14	18
22	(Estonia) Hannes Soomer	23	18	29	8	13	9	Ret		18
23	(Finland) Valter Patronen							4	Ret	13
24	(Italy) Riccardo Filippini	Ret	12	18	Ret	23	18	8	16	12
25	(Spain) Mika Pérez								6	10
26	(Italy) Lorenzo Garofoli	15	17	7						10
27	(Germany) Marcel Schultheiss	Ret	19	22	18	27	12	10	18	10
28	(Belgium) Charly Eberhard	22	16	11	Ret	22	17	11	29	10
29	(Italy) Andrea Zanella	16	Ret	9	Ret	15	Ret	Ret		8
30	(Norway) Stinius Viking Ødegård	Ret	22	28	14	17	10	Ret	21	8
31	(United Kingdom) Stefan Hill	24	28	25	17	19	24	12	15	5
32	(France) Rénald Castillon							13		3
33	(New Zealand) Connor London	27	24	21	20	25	26	14	22	2
34	(France) Amélie Démoulin	29	27	20	21	29	25	15	26	1
35	(United States) Alex Wisdom	28	26	15	22	24	20	18	25	1
	(United Kingdom) Blayes Heaven	25	23	16	Ret	26	22	16	28	0
	(New Zealand) Sam Croft	26	25	17	Ret	16	Ret	Ret	19	0
	(United States) Chris Kosan	30	29	27	19	30	23	21	23	0
	(United Kingdom) Fraser Rogers					20				0
	(Italy) Alex Magliocchetti	21	21	23						0
	(Germany) Michael Gerstacker						21			0
	(Netherlands) Jamie van Sikkelerus								24	0
	(New Zealand) Tyler Lincoln								27	0
	(United Kingdom) Carl Stevens					28				0
	(Spain) Josué Moreno								30	0
	(Italy) Alessandro Zaccone				Ret					0
	(Italy) Matteo Ferrari			DNS						0
Pos.	Rider	ARA (Spain)	ASS (Netherlands)	MNZ (Italy)	IMO (Italy)	SIL (United Kingdom)	NÜR (Germany)	MAG (France)	JER (Spain)	Pts

Colour	Result
Gold	Winner
Silver	Second place
Bronze	Third place
Green	Points classification
Blue	Non-points classification
Blue	Non-classified finish (NC)
Purple	Retired, not classified (Ret)
Red	Did not qualify (DNQ)
Red	Did not pre-qualify (DNPQ)
Black	Disqualified (DSQ)
White	Did not start (DNS)
White	Withdrew (WD)
White	Race cancelled (C)
Blank	Did not practice (DNP)
Blank	Did not arrive (DNA)
Blank	Excluded (EX)

**Bold** – Pole
Italics – Fastest lap
