= 2019 Austrian motorcycle Grand Prix =

Austrian motorcycle race

(Austria) 2019 Austrian Grand Prix
Race details
- Race 11 of 19 races in the 2019 Grand Prix motorcycle racing season
- Date: 11 August 2019
- Official name: myWorld Motorrad Grand Prix von Österreich
- Location: Red Bull Ring, Spielberg, Styria, Austria
- Course: Permanent racing facility; 4.318 km (2.683 mi)

MotoGP
Pole position
Rider	(Spain) Marc Márquez	Honda
Time	1:23.027	
Fastest lap
Rider	(Italy) Andrea Dovizioso	Ducati
Time	1:23.827 on lap 5	
Podium
First	(Italy) Andrea Dovizioso	Ducati
Second	(Spain) Marc Márquez	Honda
Third	(France) Fabio Quartararo	Yamaha

Moto2
Pole position
Rider	(Japan) Tetsuta Nagashima	Kalex
Time	1:28.718	
Fastest lap
Rider	(Italy) Luca Marini	Kalex
Time	1:29.018 on lap 20	
Podium
First	(South Africa) Brad Binder	KTM
Second	(Spain) Álex Márquez	Kalex
Third	(Spain) Jorge Navarro	Speed Up

Moto3
Pole position
Rider	(United Kingdom) John McPhee	Honda
Time	1:36.690	
Fastest lap
Rider	(Italy) Celestino Vietti	KTM
Time	1:36.587 on lap 22	
Podium
First	(Italy) Romano Fenati	Honda
Second	(Italy) Tony Arbolino	Honda
Third	(United Kingdom) John McPhee	Honda

MotoE
Pole position
Rider	(France) Mike Di Meglio	Energica
Time	1:35.182	
Fastest lap
Rider	(France) Mike Di Meglio	Energica
Time	1:43.800 on lap 3	
Podium
First	(France) Mike Di Meglio	Energica
Second	(Belgium) Xavier Siméon	Energica
Third	(United Kingdom) Bradley Smith	Energica

The 2019 Austrian motorcycle Grand Prix was the eleventh round of the 2019 MotoGP season. It was held at the Red Bull Ring in Spielberg on 11 August 2019.

== Classification ==
=== MotoGP ===
Pos.	No.	Rider	Team	Manufacturer	Laps	Time/Retired	Grid	Points
1	4	(Italy) Andrea Dovizioso	Ducati Team	Ducati	28	39:34.771	3	25
2	93	(Spain) Marc Márquez	Repsol Honda Team	Honda	28	+0.213	1	20
3	20	(France) Fabio Quartararo	Petronas Yamaha SRT	Yamaha	28	+6.117	2	16
4	46	(Italy) Valentino Rossi	Monster Energy Yamaha MotoGP	Yamaha	28	+7.719	10	13
5	12	(Spain) Maverick Viñales	Monster Energy Yamaha MotoGP	Yamaha	28	+8.674	4	11
6	42	(Spain) Álex Rins	Team Suzuki Ecstar	Suzuki	28	+8.695	7	10
7	63	(Italy) Francesco Bagnaia	Pramac Racing	Ducati	28	+16.021	5	9
8	88	(Portugal) Miguel Oliveira	Red Bull KTM Tech3	KTM	28	+16.206	13	8
9	9	(Italy) Danilo Petrucci	Ducati Team	Ducati	28	+17.350	12	7
10	21	(Italy) Franco Morbidelli	Petronas Yamaha SRT	Yamaha	28	+20.510	14	6
11	30	(Japan) Takaaki Nakagami	LCR Honda Idemitsu	Honda	28	+22.273	6	5
12	5	(France) Johann Zarco	Red Bull KTM Factory Racing	KTM	28	+25.503	16	4
13	6	(Germany) Stefan Bradl	Repsol Honda Team	Honda	28	+31.962	21	3
14	41	(Spain) Aleix Espargaró	Aprilia Racing Team Gresini	Aprilia	28	+34.741	19	2
15	17	(Czech Republic) Karel Abraham	Reale Avintia Racing	Ducati	28	+48.109	17	1
16	29	(Italy) Andrea Iannone	Aprilia Racing Team Gresini	Aprilia	27	+1 lap	18	
Ret	53	(Spain) Tito Rabat	Reale Avintia Racing	Ducati	20	Accident	15	
Ret	43	(Australia) Jack Miller	Pramac Racing	Ducati	7	Accident	8	
Ret	55	(Malaysia) Hafizh Syahrin	Red Bull KTM Tech3	KTM	2	Accident	20	
Ret	44	(Spain) Pol Espargaró	Red Bull KTM Factory Racing	KTM	1	Power Loss	11	
Ret	35	(United Kingdom) Cal Crutchlow	LCR Honda Castrol	Honda	1	Accident	9	

=== Moto2 ===
Pos.	No.	Rider	Manufacturer	Laps	Time/Retired	Grid	Points
1	41	(South Africa) Brad Binder	KTM	25	37:24.963	2	25
2	73	(Spain) Álex Márquez	Kalex	25	+0.330	11	20
3	9	(Spain) Jorge Navarro	Speed Up	25	+1.839	8	16
4	7	(Italy) Lorenzo Baldassarri	Kalex	25	+2.183	6	13
5	40	(Spain) Augusto Fernández	Kalex	25	+3.303	13	11
6	12	(Switzerland) Thomas Lüthi	Kalex	25	+4.645	5	10
7	88	(Spain) Jorge Martín	KTM	25	+5.200	12	9
8	27	(Spain) Iker Lecuona	KTM	25	+5.285	14	8
9	23	(Germany) Marcel Schrötter	Kalex	25	+6.973	16	7
10	54	(Italy) Mattia Pasini	Kalex	25	+9.428	15	6
11	5	(Italy) Andrea Locatelli	Kalex	25	+11.203	17	5
12	35	(Thailand) Somkiat Chantra	Kalex	25	+12.252	3	4
13	11	(Italy) Nicolò Bulega	Kalex	25	+13.099	19	3
14	21	(Italy) Fabio Di Giannantonio	Speed Up	25	+13.886	18	2
15	64	(Netherlands) Bo Bendsneyder	NTS	25	+18.684	23	1
16	62	(Italy) Stefano Manzi	MV Agusta	25	+20.714	21	
17	77	(Switzerland) Dominique Aegerter	MV Agusta	25	+25.000	20	
18	94	(Germany) Jonas Folger	Kalex	25	+25.226	22	
19	96	(United Kingdom) Jake Dixon	KTM	25	+28.471	27	
20	4	(South Africa) Steven Odendaal	NTS	25	+29.993	28	
21	16	(United States) Joe Roberts	KTM	25	+33.876	29	
22	65	(Germany) Philipp Öttl	KTM	25	+34.746	26	
23	72	(Italy) Marco Bezzecchi	KTM	25	+38.031	25	
24	22	(United Kingdom) Sam Lowes	Kalex	25	+44.263	24	
25	19	(Japan) Teppei Nagoe	Kalex	25	+1:00.320	31	
26	18	(Andorra) Xavi Cardelús	KTM	25	+1:00.432	32	
27	3	(Germany) Lukas Tulovic	KTM	25	+1:00.934	30	
Ret	33	(Italy) Enea Bastianini	Kalex	20	Accident	4	
Ret	10	(Italy) Luca Marini	Kalex	20	Accident	10	
Ret	87	(Australia) Remy Gardner	Kalex	19	Accident	9	
Ret	45	(Japan) Tetsuta Nagashima	Kalex	7	Accident Damage	1	
Ret	97	(Spain) Xavi Vierge	Kalex	3	Accident	7	
OFFICIAL MOTO2 REPORT

=== Moto3 ===
Pos.	No.	Rider	Manufacturer	Laps	Time/Retired	Grid	Points
1	55	(Italy) Romano Fenati	Honda	23	37:50.135	2	25
2	14	(Italy) Tony Arbolino	Honda	23	+1.097	4	20
3	17	(United Kingdom) John McPhee	Honda	23	+1.105	1	16
4	13	(Italy) Celestino Vietti	KTM	23	+1.120	5	13
5	42	(Spain) Marcos Ramírez	Honda	23	+6.789	7	11
6	48	(Italy) Lorenzo Dalla Porta	Honda	23	+7.559	8	10
7	76	(Kazakhstan) Makar Yurchenko	KTM	23	+17.880	11	9
8	84	(Czech Republic) Jakub Kornfeil	KTM	23	+17.902	10	8
9	23	(Italy) Niccolò Antonelli	Honda	23	+17.936	12	7
10	44	(Spain) Arón Canet	KTM	23	+18.030	13	6
11	75	(Spain) Albert Arenas	KTM	23	+18.730	18	5
12	79	(Japan) Ai Ogura	Honda	23	+23.800	23 (Note: 12-place grid penalty.)	4
13	71	(Japan) Ayumu Sasaki	Honda	23	+23.884	20	3
14	7	(Italy) Dennis Foggia	KTM	23	+24.240	16	2
15	40	(South Africa) Darryn Binder	KTM	23	+24.955	30 (Note: Back of the grid start penalty.)	1
16	21	(Spain) Alonso López	Honda	23	+25.595	31 (Note: Pit lane start penalty.)	
17	53	(Turkey) Deniz Öncü	KTM	23	+28.156	26	
18	27	(Japan) Kaito Toba	Honda	23	+40.414	3	
19	12	(Czech Republic) Filip Salač	KTM	23	+40.668	17	
20	73	(Austria) Maximilian Kofler	KTM	23	+41.032	24	
21	52	(Spain) Jeremy Alcoba	Honda	23	+43.327 (Note: 3-second penalty for exceeding track limits.)	21	
22	82	(Italy) Stefano Nepa	KTM	23	+48.553	15	
23	54	(Italy) Riccardo Rossi	Honda	23	+53.478	28	
24	22	(Japan) Kazuki Masaki	KTM	23	+1:16.731	19	
25	69	(United Kingdom) Tom Booth-Amos	KTM	23	+1:20.178	27	
26	16	(Italy) Andrea Migno	KTM	23	+1:24.566	29	
27	11	(Spain) Sergio García	Honda	22	+1 lap	22	
Ret	5	(Spain) Jaume Masiá	KTM	21	Accident	6	
Ret	61	(Turkey) Can Öncü	KTM	11	Accident	25	
Ret	25	(Spain) Raúl Fernández	KTM	8	Accident Damage	9	
Ret	24	(Japan) Tatsuki Suzuki	Honda	4	Accident	14	
OFFICIAL MOTO3 REPORT

=== MotoE ===
Pos.	No.	Rider	Laps	Time/Retired	Grid	Points
1	63	(France) Mike Di Meglio	5	8:41.799	1	25
2	10	(Belgium) Xavier Siméon	5	+2.238	2	20
3	38	(United Kingdom) Bradley Smith	5	+4.368	3	16
4	5	(San Marino) Alex de Angelis	5	+5.071	8	13
5	11	(Italy) Matteo Ferrari	5	+5.155	7	11
6	15	(Spain) Sete Gibernau	5	+6.845	12	10
7	16	(Australia) Joshua Hook	5	+7.961	14	9
8	7	(Italy) Niccolò Canepa	5	+10.331	11	8
9 (Note: 1-position penalty for overtaking under yellow flags.)	2	(Switzerland) Jesko Raffin	5	+8.907	4	7
10	32	(Italy) Lorenzo Savadori	5	+11.637	13	6
11	78	(France) Kenny Foray	5	+16.446	15	5
12	14	(France) Randy de Puniet	5	+18.062	18	4
13	27	(Italy) Mattia Casadei	5	+19.584	16	3
14	18	(Spain) Nicolás Terol	5	+21.244	17	2
15	66	(Finland) Niki Tuuli	5	+22.490	5	1
16	6	(Spain) María Herrera	5	+25.746	10	
17	51	(Brazil) Eric Granado	5	+1:10.619	9	
Ret	4	(Spain) Héctor Garzó	4	Accident	6	
OFFICIAL MOTOE REPORT

- All bikes manufactured by Energica.

== Championship standings after the race ==
=== MotoGP ===
Pos.	Rider	Points
1	(Spain) Marc Márquez	230
2	(Italy) Andrea Dovizioso	172
3	(Italy) Danilo Petrucci	136
4	(Spain) Álex Rins	124
5	(Italy) Valentino Rossi	103
6	(Spain) Maverick Viñales	102
7	(France) Fabio Quartararo	92
8	(Australia) Jack Miller	86
9	(United Kingdom) Cal Crutchlow	78
10	(Japan) Takaaki Nakagami	62

=== Moto2 ===
Pos.	Rider	Points
1	(Spain) Álex Márquez	181
2	(Switzerland) Thomas Lüthi	138
3	(Spain) Jorge Navarro	126
4	(Spain) Augusto Fernández	121
5	(Italy) Lorenzo Baldassarri	115
6	(Germany) Marcel Schrötter	114
7	(South Africa) Brad Binder	109
8	(Italy) Luca Marini	101
9	(Italy) Enea Bastianini	74
10	(Italy) Fabio Di Giannantonio	59

=== Moto3 ===
Pos.	Rider	Points
1	(Italy) Lorenzo Dalla Porta	155
2	(Spain) Arón Canet	154
3	(Italy) Tony Arbolino	113
4	(Italy) Niccolò Antonelli	105
5	(Spain) Marcos Ramírez	89
6	(United Kingdom) John McPhee	84
7	(Italy) Celestino Vietti	81
8	(Spain) Jaume Masiá	78
9	(Italy) Romano Fenati	67
10	(Czech Republic) Jakub Kornfeil	67

=== MotoE ===
Pos.	Rider	Points
1	(France) Mike Di Meglio	41
2	(United Kingdom) Bradley Smith	36
3	(Belgium) Xavier Siméon	29
4	(Finland) Niki Tuuli	26
5	(San Marino) Alex de Angelis	23
6	(Italy) Matteo Ferrari	22
7	(Spain) Sete Gibernau	17
8	(Spain) Héctor Garzó	13
9	(Switzerland) Jesko Raffin	11
10	(Italy) Niccolò Canepa	11

== Notes ==
Previous race: 2019 Czech Republic Grand Prix	FIM Grand Prix World Championship; 2019 season	Next race: 2019 British Grand Prix
Previous race: 2018 Austrian Grand Prix	Austrian motorcycle Grand Prix	Next race: 2020 Austrian Grand Prix
