= 2012 European Junior Cup =

European sporting event

2012 European Junior Cup
Previous:	2011	Next:	2013
Support series: Superbike World Championship; Supersport World Championship; FIM Superstock 1000 Cup; European Superstock 600 Championship

The 2012 European Junior Cup was the second season of the European Junior Cup. It was contested on equal KTM 690 Duke bikes. Lukas Wimmer won the title.

== Entry list ==
No.	Rider	Team	Rounds
2	(France) Jean-François Démoulin	JFA Performances	All
3	(Spain) Christian Vidal	Moto Club GP2012	All
5	(France) Guillaume Raymond	Vailllance Racing	8
6	(Netherlands) Rob Hartog	Moto Vudu Wildcard	1
7	(Poland) Szymon Kaczmarek	Bogdanka; Bogdanka Junior Team Poland	All
9	(Germany) Tom Busch	D. & S. Racing Team	5
10	(United Kingdom) Jamie Patterson	RPM Performance	All
11	(United Kingdom) Qays Hashmi	www.kazhashmi.com	All
12	(United Kingdom) Connor Parkhill	KTM UK	6
16	(Poland) Artur Wielebski	Bogdanka; Bogdanka Junior Team Poland	All
21	(Italy) Giovanni De Pera	Moto Vudu	2
22	(Italy) Federico Fazzina	Moto Vudu; Sicilyonbike; Futura Racing	3–8
23	(Poland) Adrian Pasek	Bogdanka; Bogdanka Junior Team Poland	All
24	(Spain) Adrián Miñana	Moto Vudu	4–5
25	(United Kingdom) Josh Daley	Moto Vudu Wildcard	6
26	(Spain) Sergio Manzaneque	S.M.G. Racing	All
27	(Spain) Javier Orellana	Europ Foods	All
29	(New Zealand) Jake Lewis	Jake Lewis Racing	1–4
30	(Latvia) Garijs Rozkalns	Bruno Racing	All
34	(New Zealand) Daniel Mettam	Preferred Mortgages	8
35	(France) Paul Haquin	Moto Vudu	8
41	(Norway) Stinius Viking Ødegård	Team Stinius Viking Odegard	All
42	(Italy) Nicola Di Girolamo	Nicola Di Girolamo Racing	3
47	(Australia) Giuseppe Scarcella	Held Australia	All
49	(South Africa) Kyran de Lange	Silverton Midas	7
55	(Ukraine) Ilya Mikhalchik	Wind Racing	All
56	(Hungary) Péter Sebestyén	Europ Foods	3-5
58	(Austria) Lukas Wimmer	MSC Schalchen	All
65	(United Kingdom) Loris Hunt	NYRRSC	All
66	(United Kingdom) Ross Patterson	RPM Performance	6
68	(United States) Brandon Kyee	Brandon Kyee Racing	All
69	(United Kingdom) Joshua Harland	Redline KTM Motorcycles	1–2, 8
71	(Italy) Kevin Chili	12 Racing	2
74	(Germany) Robin Stehr	Moto Vudu	7
75	(Spain) Gastón García	Hospitality S.L. KTM España	All
77	(Spain) Victoria Alcalá	Team Box 77	4
95	(Austria) Julian Mayer	Team Motorrad Mayer R.	4–6
777	(Spain) Miguel Aranda	Team Box 77	4

== Race calendar and results ==
Round		Country	Circuit	Date	Pole position	Fastest lap	Winning rider	Winning team
1		Netherlands	TT Circuit Assen	22 April	(Netherlands) Rob Hartog	(Poland) Adrian Pasek	(Poland) Adrian Pasek	Bogdanka
2		Italy	Autodromo Nazionale Monza	6 May	(Poland) Adrian Pasek	Race cancelled		
3		San Marino	Misano World Circuit	10 June	(Austria) Lukas Wimmer	(Austria) Lukas Wimmer	(Austria) Lukas Wimmer	MSC Schalchen
4		Spain	Motorland Aragón	1 July	(Austria) Lukas Wimmer	(Spain) Javier Orellana	(Spain) Javier Orellana	Europ Foods
5		Czech Republic	Masaryk Circuit	22 July	(Spain) Javier Orellana	(Spain) Gastón García	(Austria) Lukas Wimmer	MSC Schalchen
6		United Kingdom	Silverstone Circuit	5 August	(United Kingdom) Josh Daley	(United Kingdom) Jamie Patterson	(United Kingdom) Jamie Patterson	RPM Performance
7		Germany	Nürburgring	9 September	(Austria) Lukas Wimmer	(Austria) Lukas Wimmer	(Austria) Lukas Wimmer	MSC Schalchen
8	R1	France	Circuit de Nevers Magny-Cours	6 October	(Austria) Lukas Wimmer	(Poland) Adrian Pasek	(Austria) Lukas Wimmer	MSC Schalchen
8	R2	France	Circuit de Nevers Magny-Cours	7 October	(Austria) Lukas Wimmer	(Spain) Gastón García	(France) Guillaume Raymond	Vailllance Racing

== Championship standings ==
Pos.	Rider	ASS (Netherlands)	MNZ (Italy)	MIS (San Marino)	ARA (Spain)	BRN (Czech Republic)	SIL (United Kingdom)	NÜR (Germany)	MAG (France)		Pts
1	(Austria) Lukas Wimmer	Ret	C	**1**	**2**	1	DSQ	**1**	**1**	**3**	136
2	(Spain) Gastón García	7	C	Ret	3	2	4	2	2	4	111
3	(Spain) Javier Orellana	8	C	4	1	**3**	16	4	Ret	10	81
4	(Spain) Christian Vidal	10	C	2	4	7	10	6	7	Ret	73
5	(Poland) Artur Wielebski	3	C	12	6	10	9	3	4	Ret	72
6	(Poland) Adrian Pasek	1	**C**	DNS	DNS	6	5	8	5	Ret	65
7	(United Kingdom) Jamie Patterson	5	C	16	7	8	1	12	20	14	59
8	(France) Jean-François Démoulin	4	C	5	5	4	Ret	18	DSQ	5	59
9	(Norway) Stinius Viking Ødegård	11	C	8	11	5	12	9	8	13	51
10	(Ukraine) Ilya Mikhalchik	12	C	10	12	17	6	13	13	2	50
11	(Australia) Giuseppe Scarcella	Ret	C	3	13	9	7	Ret	11	8	48
12	(United States) Brandon Kyee	13	C	9	8	12	3	11	12	16	47
13	(Poland) Szymon Kaczmarek	9	C	14	9	11	8	10	10	11	46
14	(France) Guillaume Raymond								3	1	41
15	(Italy) Federico Fazzina			6	Ret	14	14	7	14	9	32
16	(New Zealand) Jake Lewis	6	C	7	10						25
17	(United Kingdom) Connor Parkhill						2				20
18	(Netherlands) Rob Hartog	**2**									20
19	(France) Paul Haquin								9	6	17
20	(South Africa) Kyran de Lange							5			11
21	(United Kingdom) Joshua Harland	16	C						6	Ret	10
22	(New Zealand) Daniel Mettam								15	7	10
23	(Latvia) Garijs Rozkalns	Ret	C	13	15	DNS	Ret	14	16	12	10
24	(United Kingdom) Loris Hunt	17	C	Ret	20	18	11	16	18	15	6
25	(Austria) Julian Mayer				16	13	13				6
26	(Italy) Nicola Di Girolamo			11							5
27	(United Kingdom) Qays Hashmi	14	C	17	19	15	17	Ret	19	Ret	3
28	(Spain) Sergio Manzaneque	15	C	15	18	16	18	15	17	Ret	3
29	(Spain) Miguel Aranda				14						2
30	(United Kingdom) Ross Patterson						15				1
	(Germany) Robin Stehr							17			0
	(Spain) Victoria Alcalá				17						0
	(Hungary) Péter Sebestyén			Ret	18	19					1
	(Spain) Adrián Miñana				Ret	Ret					0
	(United Kingdom) Josh Daley						**Ret**				0
	(Germany) Tom Busch					Ret					0
	(Italy) Kevin Chili		C								0
	(Italy) Giovanni De Pera		C								0
Pos.	Rider	ASS (Netherlands)	MNZ (Italy)	MIS (San Marino)	ARA (Spain)	BRN (Czech Republic)	SIL (United Kingdom)	NÜR (Germany)	MAG (France)		Pts

Colour	Result
Gold	Winner
Silver	Second place
Bronze	Third place
Green	Points finish
Blue	Non-points finish
Blue	Non-classified finish (NC)
Purple	Retired (Ret)
Red	Did not qualify (DNQ)
Red	Did not pre-qualify (DNPQ)
Black	Disqualified (DSQ)
White	Did not start (DNS)
White	Withdrew (WD)
White	Race cancelled (C)
Blank	Did not practice (DNP)
Blank	Did not arrive (DNA)
Blank	Excluded (EX)

**Bold** – Pole
Italics – Fastest Lap
