= Hiroomi Iwata =

Japanese motorcycle racer

- Nationality: Japanese
- Born: 15 August 1983 (age 43); Tokyo, Japan
Motorcycle racing career statistics
125cc World Championship
Active years	2005–2006, 2008–2009
Manufacturers	Honda
Starts / Wins / Podiums / Poles / F. laps / Points; 4 / 0 / 0 / 0 / 0 / 0

Hiroomi Iwata (岩田 裕臣, Iwata Hiroomi; born 15 August 1983) is a Japanese motorcycle racer. Within the All Japan Road Race Championship, he has competed in the GP125 class, where he was champion in 2007, and in the J-GP3 class.

== Career statistics ==
=== Grand Prix motorcycle racing ===
==== By season ====
Season	Class	Motorcycle	Team	Race	Win	Podium	Pole	FLap	Pts	Plcd
2005	125cc	Honda	Club Plus One	1	0	0	0	0	0	NC
2006	125cc	Honda	Plus One	1	0	0	0	0	0	NC
2008	125cc	Honda	DYDO Miu Racing	1	0	0	0	0	0	NC
2009	125cc	Honda	Dydo Miu Racing	1	0	0	0	0	0	NC
Total				4	0	0	0	0	0	

==== Races by year ====
(key)

Year	Class	Bike	1	2	3	4	5	6	7	8	9	10	11	12	13	14	15	16	17	Pos.	Pts
2005	125cc	Honda	SPA	POR	CHN	FRA	ITA	CAT	NED	GBR	GER	CZE	JPN; Ret	MAL	QAT	AUS	TUR	VAL		NC	0
2006	125cc	Honda	SPA	QAT	TUR	CHN	FRA	ITA	CAT	NED	GBR	GER	CZE	MAL	AUS	JPN; 27	POR	VAL		NC	0
2008	125cc	Honda	QAT	SPA	POR	CHN	FRA	ITA	CAT	GBR	NED	GER	CZE	RSM	INP	JPN; Ret	AUS	MAL	VAL	NC	0
2009	125cc	Honda	QAT	JPN; 27	SPA	FRA	ITA	CAT	NED	GER	GBR	CZE	INP	RSM	POR	AUS	MAL	VAL		NC	0
