= He Zixian =

Chinese motorcycle racer

- Nationality: (China) Chinese
- Born: 4 February 1976 (age 50); Guangzhou
Motorcycle racing career statistics
250cc World Championship
Active years	2005
Manufacturers	Yamaha
2005 championship position	NC (0 pts)
Starts / Wins / Podiums / Poles / F. laps / Points; 1 / 0 / 0 / 0 / 0 / 0

He Zixian (Chinese: 何子贤; pinyin: Hé Zǐxián, born February 4, 1976) is a Chinese Grand Prix motorcycle racer.

== Career statistics ==
=== By season ===
Season	Class	Motorcycle	Team	Race	Win	Podium	Pole	FLap	Pts	Plcd
2005	250cc	Yamaha	Team Yamaha China Tianjian	1	0	0	0	0	0	NC
Total				1	0	0	0	0	0	

=== Races by year ===
(key)

Year	Class	Bike	1	2	3	4	5	6	7	8	9	10	11	12	13	14	15	16	Pos.	Pts
2003	250cc	Yamaha	JPN	RSA	SPA	FRA	ITA	CAT	NED	GBR	GER	CZE	POR	BRA	PAC	MAL; DNQ	AUS	VAL	NC	0
2005	250cc	Yamaha	SPA	POR	CHN; 20	FRA	ITA	CAT	NED	GBR	GER	CZE	JPN	MAL	QAT	AUS	TUR	VAL	NC	0
