= Kouki Takahashi =

Japanese motorcycle racer

- Nationality: Japanese
- Born: 3 September 1987; Saitama, Japan
- Died: 24 April 2011 (aged 23); Saitama, Japan
Motorcycle racing career statistics
Moto2 World Championship
Active years	2010
Manufacturers	RBB
Starts / Wins / Podiums / Poles / F. laps / Points; 1 / 0 / 0 / 0 / 0 / 0
250cc World Championship
Active years	2005–2006
Manufacturers	Honda
Starts / Wins / Podiums / Poles / F. laps / Points; 2 / 0 / 0 / 0 / 0 / 0

Kouki Takahashi (高橋江紀, Takahashi Kōki; 3 September 1987 – 24 April 2011) was a Japanese professional motorcycle racer. He competed in Grand Prix motorcycle racing as a wildcard entrant in three Japanese Grand Prix (2005, 2006 & 2010). He died on Sunday April 24, 2011 following a road traffic accident in Saitama, Japan. He was the younger brother of former Moto2 race winner, Yuki Takahashi.

== Career statistics ==
=== Grand Prix motorcycle racing ===
==== By season ====
Season	Class	Motorcycle	Team	Number	Race	Win	Podium	Pole	FLap	Pts	Plcd
2005	250cc	Honda	Dydo Miu Racing Team	93	1	0	0	0	0	0	NC
2006	250cc	Honda	DyDo MIU Racing	93	1	0	0	0	0	0	NC
2010	Moto2	RBB	Burning Blood RT	93	1	0	0	0	0	0	NC
Total					3	0	0	0	0	0	

==== Races by year ====
(key)

Year	Class	Bike	1	2	3	4	5	6	7	8	9	10	11	12	13	14	15	16	17	Pos.	Pts
2005	250cc	Honda	SPA	POR	CHN	FRA	ITA	CAT	NED	GBR	GER	CZE	JPN; 16	MAL	QAT	AUS	TUR	VAL		NC	0
2006	250cc	Honda	SPA	QAT	TUR	CHN	FRA	ITA	CAT	NED	GBR	GER	CZE	MAL	AUS	JPN; 20	POR	VAL		NC	0
2010	Moto2	RBB	QAT	SPA	FRA	ITA	GBR	NED	CAT	GER	CZE	INP	RSM	ARA	JPN; 34	MAL	AUS	POR	VAL	NC	0
