= Cheung Wai On =

Chinese motorcycle racer (born 1981)

- Nationality: (China) Chinese
- Born: 2 May 1981 (age 45)
Motorcycle racing career statistics
125cc World Championship
Active years	2005
Manufacturers	Honda
2005 championship position	NC (0 pts)
Starts / Wins / Podiums / Poles / F. laps / Points; 2 / 0 / 0 / 0 / 0 / 0

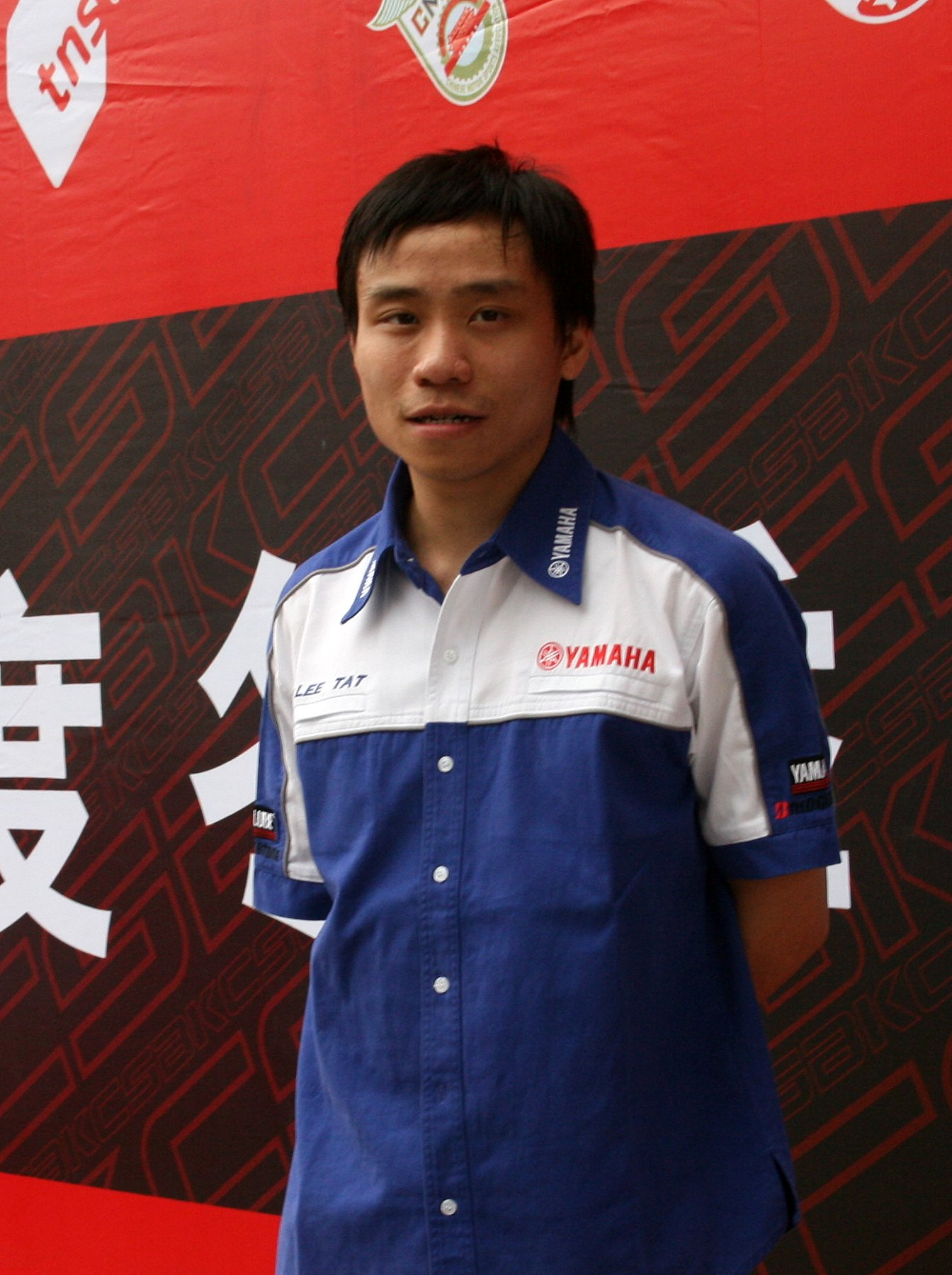
English: Hong Kong motorcycle racer Cheung Wai On in 2010.

Cheung Wai On (born May 2, 1981) is a Chinese Grand Prix motorcycle racer.

== Career statistics ==
=== By season ===
Season	Class	Motorcycle	Team	Race	Win	Podium	Pole	FLap	Pts	Plcd
2005	125cc	Honda	Ajo Motorsport	1	0	0	0	0	0	NC
2005	125cc	Honda	Arie Molenaar Racing	1	0	0	0	0	0	NC
Total				2	0	0	0	0	0	

=== Races by year ===
(key)

Year	Class	Bike	1	2	3	4	5	6	7	8	9	10	11	12	13	14	15	16	Pos.	Pts
2005	125cc	Honda	SPA	POR	CHN; 24	FRA	ITA	CAT	NED	GBR	GER	CZE	JPN	MAL; 29	QAT	AUS	TUR	VAL	NC	0
