= Andreas Mårtensson =

Swedish motorcycle racer (born 1983)

- Nationality: Swedish
- Born: 22 December 1983 (age 42); Jönköping, Sweden
- Website: andreasmartensson.se
Motorcycle racing career statistics
250cc World Championship
Active years	2005–2006
Manufacturers	Yamaha, Aprilia
Starts / Wins / Podiums / Poles / F. laps / Points; 3 / 0 / 0 / 0 / 0 / 0

Andreas Mårtensson (born 22 December 1983) is a Swedish motorcycle racer. He won the 250cc Swedish Championship in 2006 and the Superbike Swedish Championship in 2013 and he has also competed in three 250cc World Championship races.

== Career statistics ==
=== Grand Prix motorcycle racing ===
==== By season ====
Season	Class	Motorcycle	Team	Race	Win	Podium	Pole	FLap	Pts	Plcd
2005	250cc	Yamaha	Team Kurz Prista Oil	2	0	0	0	0	0	NC
2006	250cc	Aprilia	Ewes Racing Team	1	0	0	0	0	0	NC
Total				3	0	0	0	0	0	

==== Races by year ====
(key)

Year	Class	Bike	1	2	3	4	5	6	7	8	9	10	11	12	13	14	15	16	Pos.	Pts
2005	250cc	Yamaha	SPA	POR	CHN	FRA	ITA	CAT	NED	GBR; DSQ	GER; 21	CZE	JPN	MAL	QAT	AUS	TUR	VAL	NC	0
2006	250cc	Aprilia	SPA	QAT	TUR	CHN	FRA	ITA	CAT	NED	GBR	GER; Ret	CZE	MAL	AUS	JPN	POR	VAL	NC	0
