= Rhys Moller =

Australian motorcycle racer

- Nationality: Australian
- Born: 12 January 1989 (age 37); Ballarat, Australia
Motorcycle racing career statistics
125cc World Championship
Active years	2005–2008
Manufacturers	Honda
Starts / Wins / Podiums / Poles / F. laps / Points; 2 / 0 / 0 / 0 / 0 / 0

Rhys Moller (born 12 January 1989) is an Australian motorcycle racer. He has been a competitor in his home Grand Prix in the 125cc World Championship as a wild card rider.

== Career statistics ==
=== Grand Prix motorcycle racing ===
==== By season ====
Season	Class	Motorcycle	Team	Race	Win	Podium	Pole	FLap	Pts	Plcd
2005	125cc	Honda	JBD Racing	0	0	0	0	0	0	NC
2006	125cc	Honda	Rhys Moller Racing	1	0	0	0	0	0	NC
2007	125cc	Honda	Rhys Moller Racing	0	0	0	0	0	0	NC
2008	125cc	Honda	Rhys Moller Racing	1	0	0	0	0	0	NC
Total				2	0	0	0	0	0	

==== Races by year ====
Year	Class	Bike	1	2	3	4	5	6	7	8	9	10	11	12	13	14	15	16	17	Pos.	Points
2005	125cc	Honda	SPA	POR	CHN	FRA	ITA	CAT	NED	GBR	GER	CZE	JPN	MAL	QAT	AUS; DNQ	TUR	VAL		NC	0
2006	125cc	Honda	SPA	QAT	TUR	CHN	FRA	ITA	CAT	NED	GBR	GER	CZE	MAL	AUS; Ret	JPN	POR	VAL		NC	0
2007	125cc	Honda	QAT	SPA	TUR	CHN	FRA	ITA	CAT	GBR	NED	GER	CZE	RSM	POR	JPN	AUS; DNQ	MAL	VAL	NC	0
2008	125cc	Honda	QAT	SPA	POR	CHN	FRA	ITA	CAT	GBR	NED	GER	CZE	RSM	INP	JPN	AUS; Ret	MAL	VAL	NC	0
