= Tom Hatton (motorcyclist) =

Australian motorcycle racer

- Nationality: Australian
- Born: 12 November 1986 (age 40); Birmingham, England
Motorcycle racing career statistics
125cc World Championship
Active years	2005–2006, 2011
Manufacturers	Honda
Starts / Wins / Podiums / Poles / F. laps / Points; 1 / 0 / 0 / 0 / 0 / 0

Tom Hatton (born 12 November 1986 in Birmingham, England) is an Australian motorcycle racer. He has appeared in the 125cc World Championship as a wild card rider.

== Career statistics ==
=== Grand Prix motorcycle racing ===
==== By season ====
Season	Class	Motorcycle	Team	Race	Win	Podium	Pole	FLap	Pts	Plcd
2005	125cc	Honda	Allect Racing	1	0	0	0	0	0	NC
2006	125cc	Honda	Tom Hatton Racing	0	0	0	0	0	0	NC
2011	125cc	Honda	Fastline GP Racing	0	0	0	0	0	0	NC
Total				1	0	0	0	0	0	

==== Races by year ====
(key)

Year	Class	Bike	1	2	3	4	5	6	7	8	9	10	11	12	13	14	15	16	17	Pos.	Pts
2005	125cc	Honda	SPA	POR	CHN	FRA	ITA	CAT	NED	GBR	GER	CZE	JPN	MAL	QAT	AUS; Ret	TUR	VAL		NC	0
2006	125cc	Honda	SPA	QAT	TUR	CHN	FRA	ITA	CAT	NED	GBR	GER	CZE	MAL	AUS; DNQ	JPN	POR	VAL		NC	0
2011	125cc	Honda	QAT	SPA	POR	FRA	CAT	GBR	NED	ITA	GER	CZE	INP	RSM	ARA	JPN	AUS; DNQ	MAL	VAL	NC	0
