= Huang Zhi Yu =

Chinese motorcycle racer (born 1979)

- Nationality: Chinese
- Born: 24 December 1979 (age 46)

Huang Zhi Yu (Chinese: 黄至禺; pinyin: Huáng Zhìyú, born December 24, 1979) is a Chinese Grand Prix motorcycle racer.

== Career statistics ==
=== By season ===
Season	Class	Motorcycle	Team	Race	Win	Podium	Pole	FLap	Pts	Plcd
2005	250cc	Honda	Chong Quing Yuan Xgjao Racing	0	0	0	0	0	0	NC
Total				0	0	0	0	0	0	

=== Races by year ===
(key)

Year	Class	Bike	1	2	3	4	5	6	7	8	9	10	11	12	13	14	15	16	Pos.	Pts
2005	250cc	Honda	SPA	POR	CHN; DNQ	FRA	ITA	CAT	NED	GBR	GER	CZE	JPN	MAL	QAT	AUS	TUR	VAL	NC	0
