= Hamamoto =

Hamamoto (written: 濱本) is a Japanese surname. Notable people with the surname include:

- Darrell Hamamoto, American writer and academic
- Pamela Hamamoto, American diplomat
- Yuki Hamamoto (濱本 裕基, born 1985), Japanese motorcycle racer
