= Franz Aschenbrenner =

German motorcycle racer

- Nationality: German
- Born: 24 May 1986 (age 40); Erding, West Germany
- Website: franz-aschenbrenner.de
Motorcycle racing career statistics
250cc World Championship
Active years	2005–2006
Manufacturers	Yamaha, Honda, Aprilia
Starts / Wins / Podiums / Poles / F. laps / Points; 6 / 0 / 0 / 0 / 0 / 0

Franz Aschenbrenner (born 24 May 1986) is a German motorcycle racer.

== Career statistics ==
=== Grand Prix motorcycle racing ===
==== By season ====
Season	Class	Motorcycle	Team	Race	Win	Podium	Pole	FLap	Pts	Plcd
2005	250cc	Yamaha	Team UGT Kurz	0	0	0	0	0	0	NC
2005	250cc	Honda	Mototechnic Castrol Racing	1	0	0	0	0	0	NC
2006	250cc	Aprilia	Kiefer - Bos - Racing	4	0	0	0	0	0	NC
2006	250cc	Honda	Castrol GP 250 Racing	1	0	0	0	0	0	NC
Total				6	0	0	0	0	0	

==== Races by year ====
(key)

Year	Class	Bike	1	2	3	4	5	6	7	8	9	10	11	12	13	14	15	16	Pos.	Pts
2005	250cc	Yamaha	SPA; DNQ	POR; DNQ	CHN	FRA	ITA	CAT	NED	GBR									NC	0
2005	250cc	Honda									GER; Ret	CZE	JPN	MAL	QAT	AUS	TUR	VAL	NC	0
2006	250cc	Aprilia	SPA	QAT	TUR	CHN	FRA	ITA; 19	CAT; Ret	NED; 19	GBR; 20								NC	0
2006	250cc	Honda										GER; 23	CZE	MAL	AUS	JPN	POR	VAL	NC	0
