= Yuki Hamamoto =

Japanese motorcycle racer

- Nationality: Japanese
- Born: 4 September 1985 (age 41); Yamaguchi, Japan
Motorcycle racing career statistics
250cc World Championship
Active years	2007
Manufacturers	Yamaha
Starts / Wins / Podiums / Poles / F. laps / Points; 1 / 0 / 0 / 0 / 0 / 0
125cc World Championship
Active years	2005
Manufacturers	Honda
Starts / Wins / Podiums / Poles / F. laps / Points; 1 / 0 / 0 / 0 / 0 / 0

Yuki Hamamoto (濱本 裕基, Hamamoto Yūki; born 4 September 1985) is a Japanese motorcycle racer. He has competed in the GP125, GP250 and ST600 classes of the All Japan Road Race Championship.

== Career statistics ==
=== Grand Prix motorcycle racing ===
==== By season ====
Season	Class	Motorcycle	Team	Race	Win	Podium	Pole	FLap	Pts	Plcd
2005	125cc	Honda	Hamamoto Racing Team	1	0	0	0	0	0	NC
2007	250cc	Yamaha	TEC-2 & Kyushukyoritsu Univ.	1	0	0	0	0	0	NC
Total				2	0	0	0	0	0	

==== Races by year ====
(key)

Year	Class	Bike	1	2	3	4	5	6	7	8	9	10	11	12	13	14	15	16	17	Pos.	Pts
2005	125cc	Honda	SPA	POR	CHN	FRA	ITA	CAT	NED	GBR	GER	CZE	JPN; 24	MAL	QAT	AUS	TUR	VAL		NC	0
2007	250cc	Yamaha	QAT	SPA	TUR	CHN	FRA	ITA	CAT	GBR	NED	GER	CZE	RSM	POR	JPN; 20	AUS	MAL	VAL	NC	0
