= 2005 United States motorcycle Grand Prix =

2005 United States Grand Prix
Race details
- Race 8 of 17 races in the 2005 Grand Prix motorcycle racing season
- Date: July 10, 2005
- Official name: Red Bull U.S. Grand Prix
- Location: Mazda Raceway Laguna Seca
- Course: Permanent racing facility; 3.610 km (2.243 mi)

MotoGP
Pole position
- Rider: (United States) Nicky Hayden
- Time: 1:22.670
Fastest lap
- Rider: (United States) Colin Edwards
- Time: 1:23.915 on lap 5
Podium
- First: (United States) Nicky Hayden
- Second: (United States) Colin Edwards
- Third: (Italy) Valentino Rossi

The 2005 United States motorcycle Grand Prix was the eighth round of the 2005 MotoGP Championship. It took place on the weekend of July 8–10, 2005 at Mazda Raceway Laguna Seca. Only the MotoGP class raced here because of the Californian law on air pollution, which forbids 2-stroke engines in the state.

This round was the first motorcycle Grand Prix hosted by the United States since 1994.

== MotoGP race report ==
This race was most notable for the dominant win on home soil by American Nicky Hayden, as well as the second place of the other American Colin Edwards, followed by then six-time world champion Valentino Rossi in third place.

Valentino Rossi leads the standings with 170 points, followed by Marco Melandri with 107 and Max Biaggi with 87 points.

On Saturday, American Nicky Hayden scored his first ever pole position on Saturday with a time of 1:22.670. Valentino Rossi was second, +0.354 seconds behind and Brazilian veteran Alex Barros qualified third with a +0.642 deficit. The second row of the grid consisted of Troy Bayliss, and the two other Americans Colin Edwards and John Hopkins.

For this race, two teams chose special liveries for this race - Suzuki and Yamaha. The Factory Yamaha Team chose to race in its original, yellow-white combination to commemorate Yamaha's fiftieth anniversary in the sport. The Factory Suzuki Team chose to display its own one-off livery after a partnership with the Austrian energy drink company Red Bull, having unveiled it two weeks earlier at the Dutch race.

Before the start of the race, one minute of silence was held to remember the victims who had fallen in the recent 7/7 bombings in London.

All riders had their normal warm up lap before lining up in their respective grid slots. Hayden had a strong start and retains the lead on the opening lap. Behind him is the Honda Pons of Bayliss and the Yamaha of Rossi as they pass the fast Turn 1 and enter Turn 2 - the Andretti Hairpin. Half a lap passed and the top six consists of Hayden, Rossi - who had just repassed Bayliss between Turn 3 and 4 -, Bayliss, Biaggi, Hopkins and Checa. As they come up to the Corkscrew corner, Hayden already has a significant gap back to Rossi, being helped by his earlier experience on this venue from his AMA Superbike days. Behind the top six, Edwards has lost seventh to Sete Gibernau.

As lap two begins, two riders lie in the gravel trap at Turn 11. It is revealed to be Barros and Marco Melandri, who tangled with each other as Melandri tried to pass Barros but failed, touched him and caused both to retire. At Turn 5, Biaggi slides past Bayliss on his Repsol Honda and takes third place. He however runs a bit wide exiting the fast bend, allowing the Australian to get back at him and retain his spot.

Lap three and Rossi has pulled a big gap to Bayliss, who is starting to form a small train of riders behind him. Hayden still leads at the front. Edwards has managed to gain two places from the last lap shunt and also passed Gibernau to position himself behind Hopkins in sixth. He also managed to overtake Hopkins for fifth and was all over the back of Biaggi halfway into the lap.

On lap four, Hayden has pulled a gap of +1.794 seconds to second place Rossi. Behind them, Bayliss is now under pressure from Biaggi, who himself is being hounded by the more experienced Edwards. Biaggi makes his move at Turn 5, diving down the inside of Bayliss but running wide upon exit once again, allowing the Honda Pons rider to come back at him and battle him at the straight. They go side-by-side, but has to give up the position to the Italian before the start of Turn 6. However, Bayliss managed to take a tighter line and repass Biaggi at the Rahal Straight, with Edwards making a daring double-pass by going to the outer left, almost going on the gravel, managing to overtake both riders before they enter the Corkscrew sequence. Gibernau meanwhile managed to catch up due to the fighting and made a late lunge down the inside of Biaggi, shoving him out of the way and taking fifth place by force. Biaggi had lost three positions in one corner.

Lap five and Gibernau has managed to take fourth from the struggling Bayliss at Turn 1. Exiting the Andretti Hairpin, Checa tries to take seventh by overtaking the Red Bull Suzuki on the outside before Turn 3, failing and having to slot in behind. At the front, all is stable - Hayden leads Rossi by +2.1 seconds whilst Edwards has pulled a gap to Gibernau and is now slowly catching his Yamaha teammate. Between Turn 3 and 4, Biaggi took fifth from Bayliss, as did Checa from Hopkins. Meanwhile, the diminished gap Hayden has to Rossi - +1.666 seconds - has increased to +1.836 seconds.

On lap six, the gap to Rossi decreased slightly to +1.781 seconds. Third place Edwards sets the fastest lap and is still slowly hunting down Rossi. Gibernau has also managed to pass Biaggi for fourth position during this lap.

Lap seven and the duo of Gibernau and Biaggi start to create a small gap to sixth place Bayliss. Biaggi is all over the back of the Spaniard for the duration of the lap, but is not able to make a move. The gap Hayden has to Rossi has meanwhile increased again, from +1.712 to +2.003 seconds.

On lap eight, Edwards is still slowly catching Rossi. The gap he had to Edwards was +1.5 seconds last lap but that has now decreased to +1.4 seconds.

Lap nine and Biaggi is still all over the back of Gibernau, trying to take fourth place. Checa has gone down at the Andretti Hairpin, the rider desperately looking over his bike as his race is now over. He lost the front end of his bike exiting the corner, sliding out of contention as a result.

On lap ten, the gap Rossi has to Edwards has shrunk again - from +1.4 to +1.1 seconds. Biaggi, still right behind Gibernau, finally makes a move for fourth after the Spaniard runs a little wide at Turn 3, going through the corner side-by-side with the 'Roman Emperor' coming out on top.

Lap eleven and Edwards is now inching ever closer to his Italian teammate. Biaggi behind them has opened up a slight gap to Gibernau.

On lap twelve, Hayden now has a gap of +2.775 seconds to Rossi, who himself is slowly losing ground to Hayden. No overtakes happened.

Lap thirteen and Edwards is still slowly making up ground to Rossi. The gap Rossi has to Edwards has now shrunk to a mere +0.3 seconds. No overtakes happened.

On lap fourteen, Edwards is almost behind Rossi by now. Still no overtakes have happened.

Lap fifteen and the gap Hayden has to Rossi has decreased slightly to +2.5 seconds. Edwards is still trying to come closer to Rossi but has not yet been able to.

On lap sixteen - the halfway point -, Edwards has now managed to fully close the gap to Rossi. He patiently waits behind 'The Doctor', then pounces at the Corkscrew, going up his inside and manages to pass Rossi for second place under a loud cheer from the predominantly American crowd.

Lap seventeen and Rossi is not giving up, staying right behind Edwards. However, entering the Andretti Hairpin, Rossi runs wide and allows the American to easily ride away.

On lap eighteen, Hayden's gap to Edwards is +2.424 seconds. Behind them, Biaggi is still ahead of Gibernau, who is shadowing Biaggi's moves.

With a jubilant American crowd cheering on Edwards as he crosses the line on the start of lap nineteen, he now wants to give chase to leader Hayden. He took +0.2 seconds from Hayden and decreased the gap to +2.1 seconds. The gap comes down even more in sector 1 - from +2.163 to +2.045 seconds as Hayden has to overtake a backmarker in the form of James Ellison. In sector 2, the gap diminishes again, from +2.045 to +1.905 seconds.

Lap twenty and Rossi also passes backmarker Ellison before Turn 1. The gap Edwards has to Rossi is +1.8 seconds. At the short straight before Turn 4, Ellison lets Biaggi and Gibernau past as well. The gap has since increased to +2.071 seconds, then decreased again to +2.001 seconds.

On lap twenty-one, Hayden starts to increase the gap he has to Edwards again.

Lap twenty-two and the top six is as follows: Hayden, Edwards, Rossi, Biaggi, Gibernau and Bayliss. Behind them, Shinya Nakano and Makoto Tamada are fighting for eighth place. The Konica Minolta rider is right behind the Kawasaki but is unable to make a move so far.

On lap twenty-three, the front is still very much stable with Hayden in the lead. Biaggi meanwhile has pulled away from Gibernau and is now looking to close the gap to Rossi.

Lap twenty-four and Tamada has passed Nakano for eighth on the previous lap. No overtakes happened at the front.

The American crowd is cheering on Hayden as he crosses the line to start lap twenty-five. The gap to Edwards is now +2.202 seconds.

On lap twenty-six, the gap Hayden has to Edwards has dropped to +1.997, then dropped again to +1.927 seconds in sector 1. At sector 2, the gap increased slightly to +1.988 seconds.

Lap twenty-seven, Tamada overtakes Hopkins at Turn 1, the Japanese making good use of his superior Honda top-end speed to blast past on the inside.

On lap twenty-eight, the gap Hayden has to Edwards has increased from +2.182 to +2.397 seconds.

The Americans fans getjubilant as they see Hayden cross the line to start lap twenty-nine. Further behind, Loris Capirossi on the Ducati in tenth spot has caught Nakano's Kawasaki and is right behind him. Tamada is now challenging Bayliss' Honda Pons for sixth position.

Lap thirty and the positions are still stable. The gap Rossi has to Biaggi is +1.558 seconds, increasing to +1.732 seconds at sector 2.

On lap thirty-one, the penultimate lap, Rossi has started closing the gap to his teammate again. Hayden is still leading at the front and no overtakes happened.

The final lap - lap thirty-two - has begun and the American crowd goes wild as there are still two Americans in front. Hayden leads Edwards by a dominant +2.6 seconds whilst the other American now has to do everything to keep Rossi at bay as he starts closing in. Rossi tries all throughout the lap to get close enough to make a move, but Edwards bravely defends and hangs on. Gibernau meanwhile has closed up on Biaggi and tries to make a late lunge at Turn 12 but fails. Hayden crosses the line in celebratory fashion to win the race - his first win on home soil, as well as his first ever win in total - with Edwards crossing the line in second, just ahead of Rossi who completes the podium. Biaggi crosses the line in fourth, Gibernau in fifth and Bayliss just manages to hold off a charging Tamada for sixth.

At the parade lap back to parc fermé, Hayden was seen celebrating, waving at the crowd as the marshalls congratulated him by waving their flags.

As the riders walk up to the podium, Nicky Hayden gets a loud cheer of happiness from the crowd as he joyfully raises his arm to indicate his win. He does a funny dance, then steps onto the top step as Rossi and Edwards shake hands with the winner.

1993 500cc world champion Kevin Schwantz hands Rossi the third-place trophy, Edwards the second-place trophy and four-time 500cc world champion Eddie Lawson hands Hayden the winners trophy, who greatly accepts it and holds it above his head in glee. Lawson also hands Pete Benson - the chief mechanic of the Repsol Honda team - the constructors trophy.

On the podium, the U.S. national anthem plays for Hayden, causing him to cry. The fans shout Hayden's name as he wipes away his tears, and champagne is handed to the trio while they start to spray it upon each other, the fans and a grid girl who stood in close proximity.

Hayden's win does not affect Rossi's championship hunt. 'The Doctor' now has a lead of 186 points, extending his lead to 79 points to second place Marco Melandri with 107 and third place Max Biaggi with 100 points.

== MotoGP classification ==
| Pos. | No. | Rider | Team | Manufacturer | Laps | Time/Retired | Grid | Points |
|---|---|---|---|---|---|---|---|---|
| 1 | 69 | (United States) Nicky Hayden | Repsol Honda Team | Honda | 32 | 45:15.374 | 1 | 25 |
| 2 | 5 | (United States) Colin Edwards | Yamaha Factory Racing | Yamaha | 32 | +1.941 | 5 | 20 |
| 3 | 46 | (Italy) Valentino Rossi | Yamaha Factory Racing | Yamaha | 32 | +2.312 | 2 | 16 |
| 4 | 3 | (Italy) Max Biaggi | Repsol Honda Team | Honda | 32 | +4.216 | 7 | 13 |
| 5 | 15 | (Spain) Sete Gibernau | Movistar Honda MotoGP | Honda | 32 | +4.478 | 13 | 11 |
| 6 | 12 | (Australia) Troy Bayliss | Honda Pons | Honda | 32 | +22.381 | 4 | 10 |
| 7 | 6 | (Japan) Makoto Tamada | Konica Minolta Honda | Honda | 32 | +22.493 | 9 | 9 |
| 8 | 21 | (United States) John Hopkins | Red Bull Suzuki | Suzuki | 32 | +23.148 | 6 | 8 |
| 9 | 56 | (Japan) Shinya Nakano | Kawasaki Racing Team | Kawasaki | 32 | +23.625 | 10 | 7 |
| 10 | 65 | (Italy) Loris Capirossi | Ducati Team | Ducati | 32 | +26.123 | 14 | 6 |
| 11 | 11 | (Spain) Rubén Xaus | Fortuna Yamaha Team | Yamaha | 32 | +43.512 | 16 | 5 |
| 12 | 66 | (Germany) Alex Hofmann | Kawasaki Racing Team | Kawasaki | 32 | +50.957 | 15 | 4 |
| 13 | 24 | (Spain) Toni Elías | Fortuna Yamaha Team | Yamaha | 32 | +51.343 | 17 | 3 |
| 14 | 10 | (United States) Kenny Roberts Jr. | Red Bull Suzuki | Suzuki | 32 | +1:13.749 | 12 | 2 |
| 15 | 67 | (United Kingdom) Shane Byrne | Team Roberts | Proton KR | 32 | +1:24.256 | 19 | 1 |
| 16 | 77 | (United Kingdom) James Ellison | Blata WCM | Blata | 32 | +1:24.524 | 20 | |
| 17 | 27 | (Italy) Franco Battaini | Blata WCM | Blata | 31 | +1 lap | 21 | |
| Ret | 44 | (Italy) Roberto Rolfo | Team d'Antin Pramac | Ducati | 30 | Retirement | 18 | |
| Ret | 7 | (Spain) Carlos Checa | Ducati Team | Ducati | 8 | Accident | 8 | |
| Ret | 33 | (Italy) Marco Melandri | Movistar Honda MotoGP | Honda | 0 | Accident | 11 | |
| Ret | 4 | (Brazil) Alex Barros | Honda Pons | Honda | 0 | Accident | 3 | |

== Championship standings after the race (MotoGP) ==
Below are the standings for the top five riders and constructors after round eight has concluded.

Riders' Championship standings

| Pos. | Rider | Points |
|---|---|---|
| 1 | (Italy) Valentino Rossi | 186 |
| 2 | (Italy) Marco Melandri | 107 |
| 3 | (Italy) Max Biaggi | 100 |
| 4 | (Spain) Sete Gibernau | 95 |
| 5 | (United States) Colin Edwards | 93 |

Constructors' Championship standings

| Pos. | Constructor | Points |
|---|---|---|
| 1 | (Japan) Yamaha | 190 |
| 2 | (Japan) Honda | 166 |
| 3 | (Japan) Kawasaki | 75 |
| 4 | (Italy) Ducati | 64 |
| 5 | (Japan) Suzuki | 35 |

- Note: Only the top five positions are included for both sets of standings.

| Previous race: 2005 Dutch TT | FIM Grand Prix World Championship; 2005 season | Next race: 2005 British Grand Prix |
| Previous race: 1994 United States Grand Prix | United States motorcycle Grand Prix | Next race: 2006 United States Grand Prix |
