= Chinese motorcycle Grand Prix =

Coordinates: 31°20′14″N 121°13′15″E

Chinese Grand Prix

Grand Prix motorcycle racing
- Venue: Shanghai International Circuit (2005–2008)
- First race: 2005
- Last race: 2008
- Most wins (rider): Mika Kallio, Valentino Rossi, Casey Stoner (2)
- Most wins (manufacturer): Aprilia (5)

The Chinese motorcycle Grand Prix was a motorcycling event that was part of the World Motorcycle Racing season, from 2005 until 2008.

== History ==
The Chinese Grand Prix was scheduled to run until 2011, but a low amount of spectator attendance, poor promotion and a lack of commercial interest caused the race to be scrapped from the 2009 calendar onwards.

== Official names and sponsors ==
- 2005: Taobao.com Grand Prix of China
- 2006: Polini Grand Prix of China
- 2007: Sinopec Great Wall Lubricants Grand Prix of China
- 2008: Pramac Grand Prix of China

== Winners ==
=== Multiple winners (riders) ===
# Wins	Rider	Wins	
# Wins	Rider	Category	Years won
2	(Australia) Casey Stoner	MotoGP	2007
2	(Australia) Casey Stoner	250cc	2005
2	(Italy) Valentino Rossi	MotoGP	2005, 2008
2	(Finland) Mika Kallio	250cc	2008
2	(Finland) Mika Kallio	125cc	2006

=== Multiple winners (manufacturers) ===
# Wins	Manufacturer	Wins	
# Wins	Manufacturer	Category	Years won
5	(Italy) Aprilia	250cc	2005, 2006, 2007
5	(Italy) Aprilia	125cc	2005, 2008
2	(Japan) Yamaha	MotoGP	2005, 2008
2	(Austria) KTM	250cc	2008
2	(Austria) KTM	125cc	2006

=== By year ===
Year	Track	125cc		250cc		MotoGP		Report
Year	Track	Rider	Manufacturer	Rider	Manufacturer	Rider	Manufacturer	Report
2008	Shanghai	(Italy) Andrea Iannone	Aprilia	(Finland) Mika Kallio	KTM	(Italy) Valentino Rossi	Yamaha	Report
2007	Shanghai	(Czech Republic) Lukáš Pešek	Derbi	(Spain) Jorge Lorenzo	Aprilia	(Australia) Casey Stoner	Ducati	Report
2006	Shanghai	(Finland) Mika Kallio	KTM	(Spain) Héctor Barberá	Aprilia	(Spain) Dani Pedrosa	Honda	Report
2005	Shanghai	(Italy) Mattia Pasini	Aprilia	(Australia) Casey Stoner	Aprilia	(Italy) Valentino Rossi	Yamaha	Report
