= Daniel Sáez (motorcyclist, born 1985) =

Spanish motorcycle racer

- Nationality: Spanish
- Born: 10 June 1985 (age 41); Almoradí, Spain
Motorcycle racing career statistics
125cc World Championship
| Active years | 2005–2008 |
| Manufacturers | Aprilia |
Starts / Wins / Podiums / Poles / F. laps / Points; 11 / 0 / 0 / 0 / 0 / 0

Daniel Sáez Tomás (born 10 June 1985) is a Spanish motorcycle racer.

== Career statistics ==
=== Grand Prix motorcycle racing ===
==== By season ====
| Season | Class | Motorcycle | Team | Race | Win | Podium | Pole | FLap | Pts | Plcd |
|---|---|---|---|---|---|---|---|---|---|---|
| 2005 | 125cc | Aprilia | Totti Top Sport - NGS | 4 | 0 | 0 | 0 | 0 | 0 | NC |
| 2005 | 125cc | Aprilia | 3C Racing Junior | 4 | 0 | 0 | 0 | 0 | 0 | NC |
| 2006 | 125cc | Aprilia | Quinto Almoradi | 2 | 0 | 0 | 0 | 0 | 0 | NC |
| 2007 | 125cc | Aprilia | Quinto Almoradi | 2 | 0 | 0 | 0 | 0 | 0 | NC |
| 2008 | 125cc | Aprilia | Gaviota Prosolia Racing | 3 | 0 | 0 | 0 | 0 | 0 | NC |
| Total | | | | 11 | 0 | 0 | 0 | 0 | 0 | |

==== Races by year ====
| Year | Class | Bike | 1 | 2 | 3 | 4 | 5 | 6 | 7 | 8 | 9 | 10 | 11 | 12 | 13 | 14 | 15 | 16 | 17 | Pos. | Points |
|---|---|---|---|---|---|---|---|---|---|---|---|---|---|---|---|---|---|---|---|---|---|
| 2005 | 125cc | Aprilia | SPA; Ret | POR | CHN | FRA | ITA | CAT; 24 | NED | GBR | GER | CZE | JPN | MAL | QAT | AUS | TUR; Ret | VAL; Ret | | NC | 0 |
| 2006 | 125cc | Aprilia | SPA; 32 | QAT | TUR | CHN | FRA | ITA | CAT | NED | GBR | GER | CZE | MAL | AUS | JPN | POR | VAL; 36 | | NC | 0 |
| 2007 | 125cc | Aprilia | QAT | SPA; 24 | TUR | CHN | FRA | ITA | CAT | GBR | NED | GER | CZE | RSM | POR | JPN | AUS | MAL | VAL; 26 | NC | 0 |
| 2008 | 125cc | Aprilia | QAT | SPA; 23 | POR | CHN | FRA | ITA | CAT; 27 | GBR | NED | GER | CZE | RSM | INP | JPN | AUS | MAL | VAL; 24 | NC | 0 |
