= Turkish motorcycle Grand Prix =

Coordinates: 40°57′06″N 29°24′18″E

Turkish Grand Prix

Grand Prix motorcycle racing
- Venue: Istanbul Park (2005–2007)
- First race: 2005
- Last race: 2007
- Most wins (rider): Marco Melandri, Casey Stoner (2)
- Most wins (manufacturer): Honda (5)

The Turkish motorcycle Grand Prix was a motorcycling event that was part of the World Motorcycle Racing season.

The races were held in Istanbul Park in Istanbul.

== History ==
The inaugural race was held in 2005 after the Rio de Janeiro Grand Prix was scrapped from the calendar. However, after only three years, the race was taken off the calendar due to financial troubles. The Istanbul Park circuit had problems raising the money to stage a MotoGP round every year, and the local authorities refused to help with the funding of the race, despite the boost it gave to the local economy. After the venue was taken over by now ex-Formula One chief executive Bernie Ecclestone and DORNA chairman Carmelo Ezpeleta said that no decision was taken about including the Turkish GP into the 2008 calendar, the race was dropped and replaced by the Portuguese Grand Prix, who was moved to the now empty Turkey slot after the Indianapolis Grand Prix was confirmed.

== Official names and sponsors ==
- 2005–2007: Grand Prix of Turkey (no official sponsor)

== Spectator attendance ==
2006: 38.123

== Winners ==
=== Multiple winners (riders) ===
# Wins	Rider	Wins	
# Wins	Rider	Category	Years won
2	(Italy) Marco Melandri	MotoGP	2005, 2006
2	(Australia) Casey Stoner	MotoGP	2007
2	(Australia) Casey Stoner	250cc	2005

=== Multiple winners (manufacturers) ===
# Wins	Manufacturer	Wins	
# Wins	Manufacturer	Category	Years won
5	(Japan) Honda	MotoGP	2005, 2006
5	(Japan) Honda	250cc	2006, 2007
5	(Japan) Honda	125cc	2005
3	(Italy) Aprilia	250cc	2005
3	(Italy) Aprilia	125cc	2006, 2007

=== By year ===
Year	Track	125cc		250cc		MotoGP		Report
Year	Track	Rider	Manufacturer	Rider	Manufacturer	Rider	Manufacturer	Report
2007	Istanbul Park	(Italy) Simone Corsi	Aprilia	(Italy) Andrea Dovizioso	Honda	(Australia) Casey Stoner	Ducati	Report
2006	Istanbul Park	(Spain) Héctor Faubel	Aprilia	(Japan) Hiroshi Aoyama	Honda	(Italy) Marco Melandri	Honda	Report
2005	Istanbul Park	(France) Mike di Meglio	Honda	(Australia) Casey Stoner	Aprilia	(Italy) Marco Melandri	Honda	Report
