= 2005 Grand Prix motorcycle racing season =

Sports season

2005 F.I.M. Grand Prix motorcycle racing season

Seasons
- ← 2004 2006 →

2005 World Champions

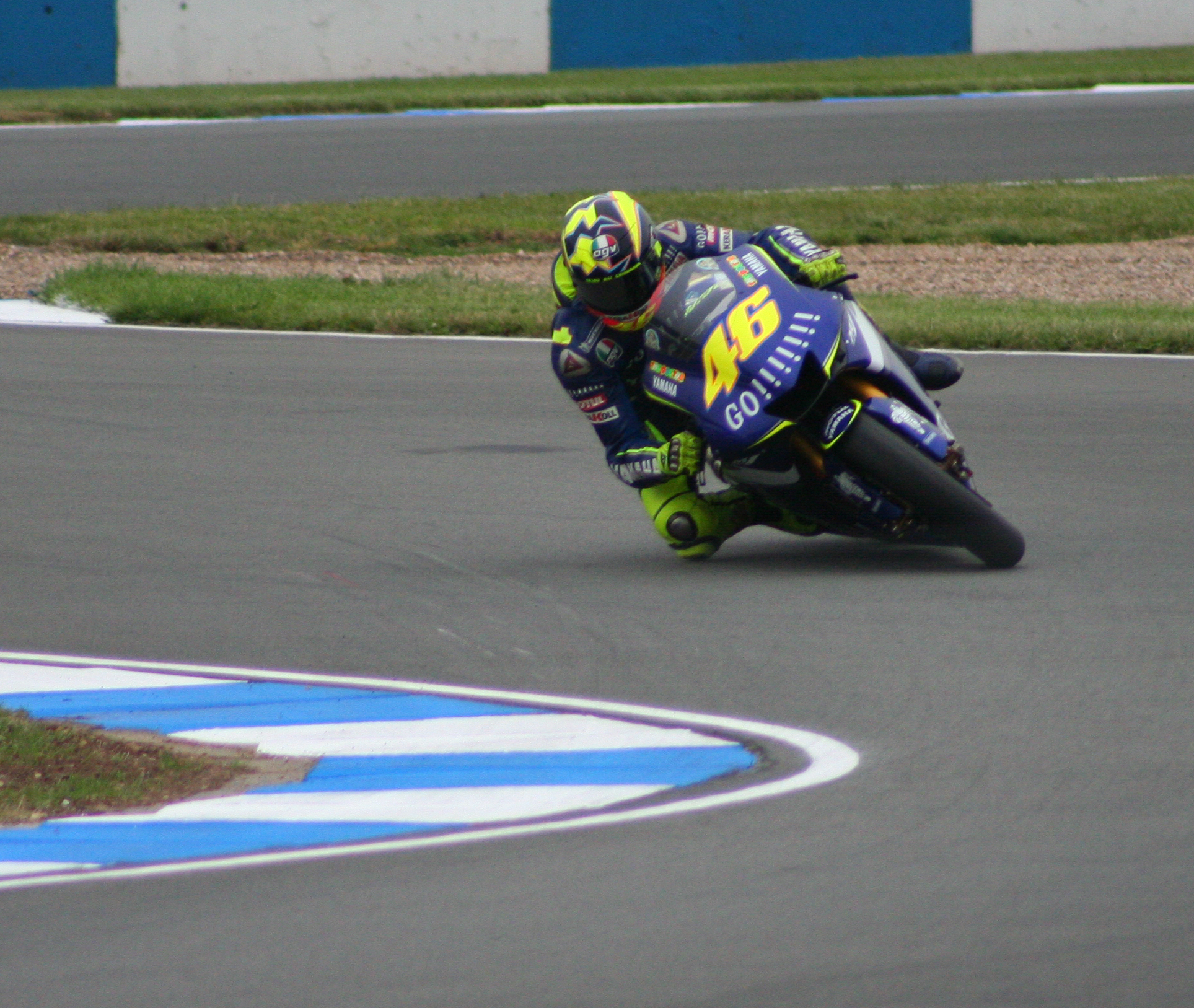
Valentino Rossi (pictured at Donington Park) became the MotoGP World Champion

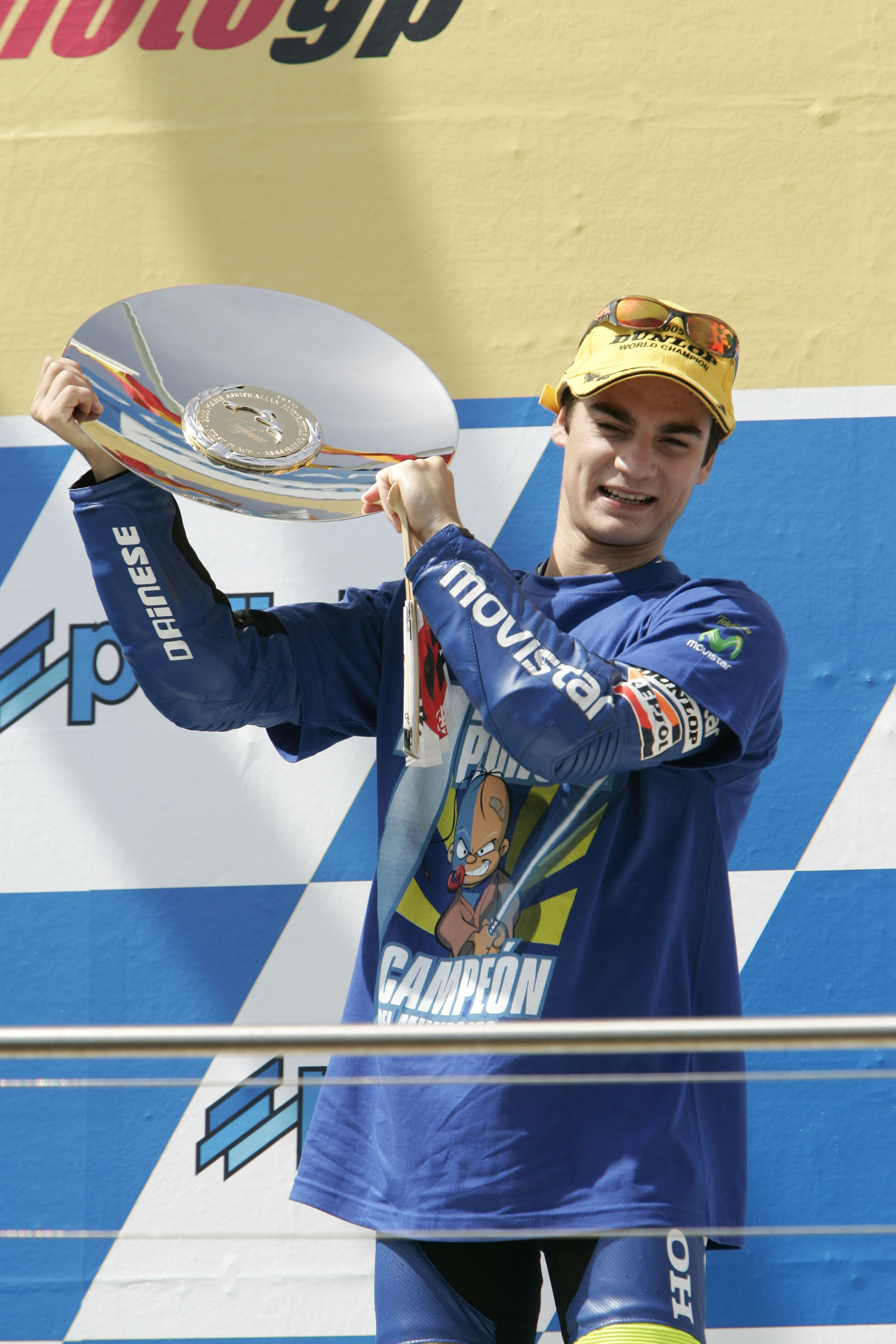
Daniel Pedrosa (pictured at Phillip Island) became the 250cc World Champion

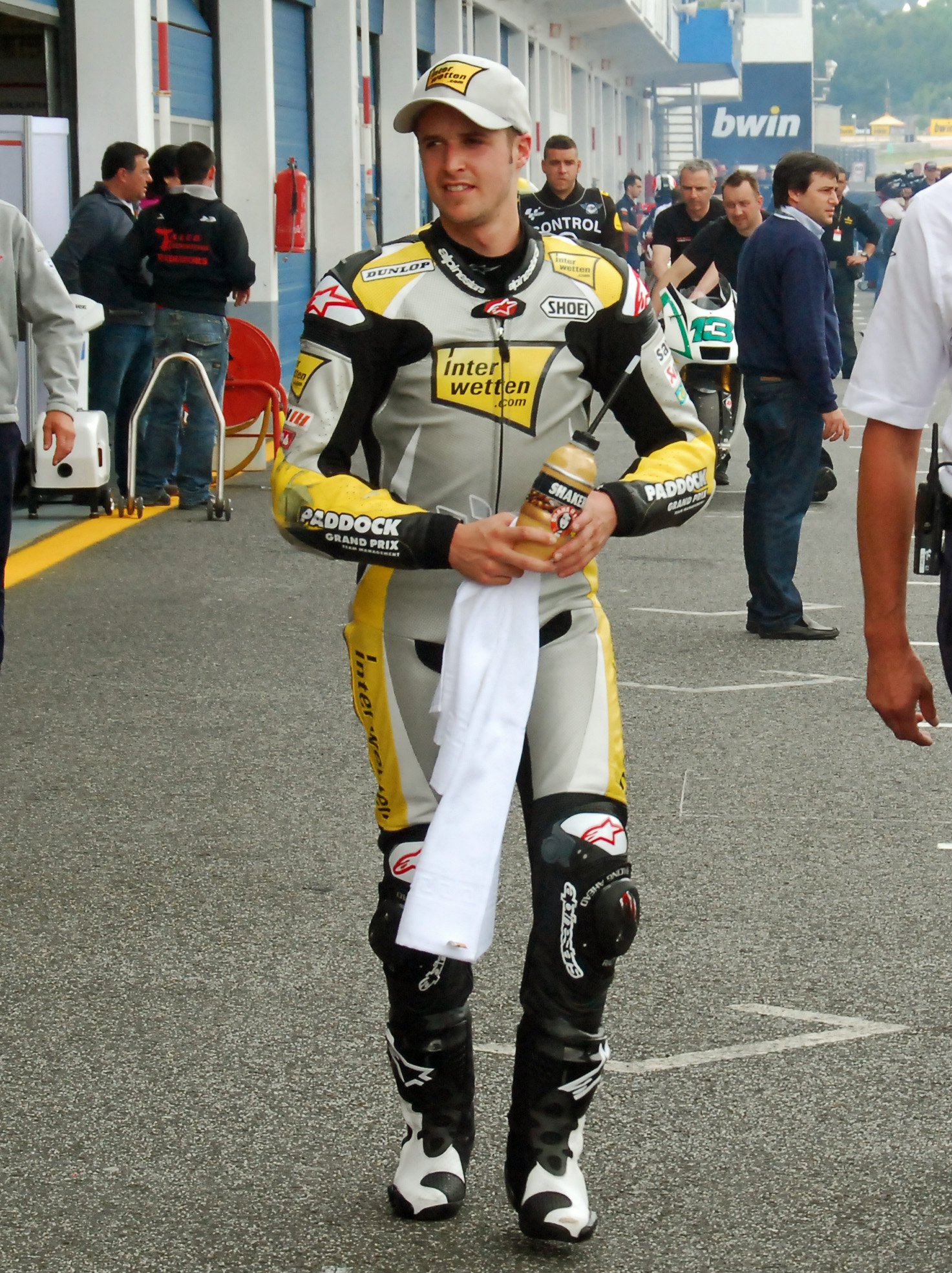
Thomas Lüthi (pictured in 2011) became the 125cc World Champion

The 2005 Grand Prix motorcycle racing season was the 57th F.I.M. Road racing World Championship season. The season consisted out of 17 races for the MotoGP class and 16 for the 125cc and 250cc classes, beginning with the Spanish motorcycle Grand Prix on 10 April and ending with the Valencian Community motorcycle Grand Prix on 6 November.

== Season summary ==
=== MotoGP class ===
The MotoGP championship was won by Valentino Rossi on a Yamaha. It was a season which featured a lot of dramatic races including four rain-affected races in Portugal, China, France and Great Britain. It also saw the domination of Rossi with a total of 16 podiums out of 17 races, out of which 11 of them were wins. He defeated Marco Melandri by a distant 147 points in the championship.

=== 250cc class ===
Daniel Pedrosa won his second consecutive 250cc title on a Honda. Reigning 125cc champion Andrea Dovizioso became the rookie of the year.

=== 125cc class ===
The 125cc title was won by Thomas Lüthi on a Honda. He won the World championship by just 5 points ahead of Mika Kallio.

== 2005 Grand Prix season calendar ==
On 20 August 2004, the FIM released the initial 2005 calendar. In it, the South African and Rio Grand Prix were still on the calendar. On 10 October 2004, the FIM confirmed the 2005 calendar. In it, the Rio Grand Prix won out over the South African round, initially being scheduled on the 17th of April. The date of the Malaysian GP was also moved from 9 October to 11 September. On 22 December 2004, changes were made to the calendar. Multiple dates were altered: the date of the Italian GP was moved from 29 May to 5 June, the Catalan GP from 5 to 12 June, the British GP from 19 June to 24 July, the German GP from 24 to 31 July and the Malaysian GP from 11 to 25 September. The Rio GP was also still subject to confirmation. On 18 February 2005, more changes were made. Because no contract was signed for the Rio GP, the round was dropped and the Turkish GP was added instead. The date of the Portuguese GP was moved from 30 October to 17 April as well. By this time, the race was also subject to confirmation.

The following Grands Prix were scheduled to take place in 2005:

Round	Date	Grand Prix	Circuit
1	10 April	(Spain) Gran Premio Marlboro de España	Circuito de Jerez
2	17 April	betandwin.com Grande Prémio de Portugal	Autódromo do Estoril
3	1 May	Taobao.com Grand Prix of China	Shanghai International Circuit
4	15 May	Grand Prix Alice de France	Bugatti Circuit
5	5 June	(Italy) Gran Premio Alice d'Italia	Mugello Circuit
6	12 June	(Catalonia) Gran Premi Gauloises de Catalunya	Circuit de Catalunya
7	25 June ††	(Netherlands) Gauloises TT Assen	TT Circuit Assen
8	10 July †	(United States) Red Bull U.S. Grand Prix	Mazda Raceway Laguna Seca
9	24 July	(United Kingdom) betandwin.com British Grand Prix	Donington Park
10	31 July	(Germany) Alice Motorrad Grand Prix Deutschland	Sachsenring
11	28 August	(Czech Republic) Gauloises Grand Prix České republiky	Brno Circuit
12	18 September	Grand Prix of Japan	Twin Ring Motegi
13	25 September	(Malaysia) Marlboro Malaysian Motorcycle Grand Prix	Sepang International Circuit
14	1 October ††	Marlboro Grand Prix of Qatar	Losail International Circuit
15	16 October	Polini Grand Prix of Australia	Phillip Island Grand Prix Circuit
16	23 October	Grand Prix of Turkey	Istanbul Park
17	6 November	(Valencian Community) Gran Premio betandwin.com de la Comunitat Valenciana	Circuit Ricardo Tormo

† = MotoGP class only
†† = Saturday race

=== Calendar changes ===
- The South African and Rio de Janeiro Grands Prix were taken off the calendar.
- The Portuguese Grand Prix was moved forward, from 5 September to 17 April.
- The Chinese Grand Prix and Turkish Grands Prix were added to the calendar.
- The United States Grand Prix was added to the calendar, but only the MotoGP class raced due to a Californian law on air pollution banning 2 stroke engines.

== Regulation changes ==
The following changes are made to the regulation for the 2005 season:

=== Sporting regulations ===
- A new 'flag-to-flag' rule has been introduced. This means that, in the event of rain, the race will not be stopped and instead will be allowed to change bikes. This rule will only count for the MotoGP class.
- A new white flag has been introduced. If this flag is waved at a marshal post during the race, all riders are allowed to change bikes.
- Changes have been made to the starting procedure. Unless the race is interrupted, after the leading rider has crossed the finish line at the end of his first lap, the riders are not allowed to change their bikes in the MotoGP class. If a race has been declared 'wet', riders are allowed to change a bike equipped with a rain tyre to a bike with an intermediate or slick tyre or vice versa, or from a bike equipped with a slick tyre to a bike equipped with an intermedia or rain tyre is allowed at any time during a race. However, if a race has not been declared 'wet', the change of bikes are only allowed after the new white flag is shown around the circuit. In both cases, aids such as tyre warmers, the replacement of tyres and general adjustments are allowed on the bike in the pits. During the ride through the pits, all riders must respect the speed limit of 60 km/h from the start to the end of the sign. In the pits, overtaking is forbidden and any rider who breaks this rule will be fined 100 U.S. Dollar for the first offence and 500 U.S. Dollar for ensuing offences at the same place. Any rider who breaks this rule during a race will be penalised with a ride through penalty. In the case of an infringement, the Race Direction must communicate the offence to the team of the rider after having received the information. The rules will not be changed for the 125cc and 250cc classes.
- All races will be categorised as either 'wet' or 'dry'. A board might be displayed on the grid to show the current status of the race. If no board is displayed, the race is automatically considered 'dry'. The purpose of this classification is to indicate to all the riders the consequence of varying conditions during the race.
- An update has been made to the yellow flag rule. In case of danger, riders must already slow down, be prepared to stop if needed and are forbidden to overtake until the green flag is shown. If this rule is infringed upon, the lap time of the rider will be cancelled. New in this case is, in case of a violation of the rule during the race, the rider must return to his position prior to his pass. The penalty will first be communicated to the team, who then displays a board for the rider on the finish line during a maximum of three laps. If the rider does not go back to his previous position after the board has been shown to him three times, he will be penalised via a ride through penalty. In both cases, further penalties such as a fine or suspension can also be implemented. If a rider realises that he did an infraction immediately after having overtaken another rider, he must raise his hand and let the rider(s) past that he had overtaken. If he does this, no penalty will be imposed. During the final lap of inspection, this flag must be waved at the exact place where the flag marshal will be placed during the practices and races.
- A new age limit will come into effect for the 125cc class. From now on, the minimal age of entry for the class will be 19 years and 21 weeks old.
- A limit will be imposed on the maximum number of team personnel on the pit lane. The maximum number of team personnel per rider in the pits has been limited to four for all classes.
- Each team which is a member of the IRTA must submit an entry for their team by the 28th of February of the year in question. An exception is made when special dispensation is granted, which is valid for all races in the FIM Road Racing World Championship Grand Prix. At the same time, the team must specify the designated riders and the class in which they will participate, as well as the circuits used for testing designated by teams in the 125cc and 250cc classes.
- Practice restrictions have been introduced. Contracted teams and their designated riders who profit from a Participation Agreement to take part in the MotoGP class are forbidden from practicing at any circuit from 1 December of one year and 20 January of the next year, both dates being inclusive. Contracted teams and their designated riders who profit from a Participation Agreement to take part in the 125cc and 250cc classes may only participate in winter testing (tests between the end of the season and the first event of the following season), at circuits in the continental zone where the team is located (Europe, Asia/Oceania, Africa and the Americas).
- Contracted teams and their designated riders who profit from a Participation Agreement in any class are forbidden from practicing:

- at any circuit included on the calendar of the current year after the date that is fourteen days prior to the start of the first race of the season.
- at any circuit included on the calendar of the current year during "breaks". A break is defined as 'two consecutive weekends where events are not scheduled'. The period of the break begins from 09:00 on the Wednesday after the last grand prix until the following grand prix.

The following exceptions will apply to the rule:

- Free practice or qualifying practice at the event.
- Practice at any circuit after the event at that circuit except during a break.
- Official practice sessions organised by the IRTA.
- Practice by contracted teams and their designated riders who profit from a Participation Agreement to participate in the 125cc and 250cc classes, at the two testing circuits appointed by each team which may take place up to fourteen days before the scheduled race for the circuit, except for when there is a break.

- Practice restrictions do not apply to wild card riders. An exception is made to a practice session or race at any circuit within fourteen days of a race.

This rule was additionally added on the 30th of August 2005:

- A change has been made to the start procedure if a race has been interrupted. In case of a normal start, the riders will now only be allowed to do a single warm-up lap ahead of the restart instead of the previous two.

=== Technical regulations ===
- All fuel tanks must be filled with material that is fire retardant or be lined with a fuel cell bladder. All fuel tanks made out of any metallic material such as steel, aluminium and so on, must be filled with material that is fire retardant or be lined with a fuel cell bladder. In the MotoGP class, all fuel tanks made out of any composite material such as carbon fibre, aramid fibre and so on, must have passed the FIM standards for fuel tanks and be lined with a fuel cell bladder. Any fuel tanks made out of composite material must have a label verifying that it conforms to the FIM Fuel Tank test standards. These labels must include the fuel tank manufacturer's name, the take of the tank manufacturer and the name of the testing laboratory. Full details of the standards are available from the FIM.
- The fuel tank capacity for all four-stroke bikes will be reduced from 24 to 22 litres.

== 2005 Grand Prix season results ==
Round	Date	Race	Location	125cc winner	250cc winner	MotoGP winner	Report
1	10 April	(Spain) Spanish motorcycle Grand Prix	Jerez	(Italy) Marco Simoncelli	(Spain) Daniel Pedrosa	(Italy) Valentino Rossi	Report
2	17 April	(Portugal) Portuguese motorcycle Grand Prix	Estoril	(Finland) Mika Kallio	(Australia) Casey Stoner	(Brazil) Alex Barros	Report
3	1 May	(China) Chinese motorcycle Grand Prix	Shanghai	(Italy) Mattia Pasini	(Australia) Casey Stoner	(Italy) Valentino Rossi	Report
4	15 May	(France) French motorcycle Grand Prix	Le Mans	(Switzerland) Thomas Lüthi	(Spain) Daniel Pedrosa	(Italy) Valentino Rossi	Report
5	5 June	(Italy) Italian motorcycle Grand Prix	Mugello	(Hungary) Gábor Talmácsi	(Spain) Daniel Pedrosa	(Italy) Valentino Rossi	Report
6	12 June	(Catalonia) Catalan motorcycle Grand Prix	Catalunya	(Italy) Mattia Pasini	(Spain) Daniel Pedrosa	(Italy) Valentino Rossi	Report
7	25 June ††	(Netherlands) Dutch TT	Assen	(Hungary) Gábor Talmácsi	(Argentina) Sebastián Porto	(Italy) Valentino Rossi	Report
8	10 July †	United States motorcycle Grand Prix	Laguna Seca	No 125cc and 250cc race		(United States) Nicky Hayden	Report
9	24 July	(United Kingdom) British motorcycle Grand Prix	Donington	(Spain) Julián Simón	(France) Randy de Puniet	(Italy) Valentino Rossi	Report
10	31 July	(Germany) German motorcycle Grand Prix	Sachsenring	(Finland) Mika Kallio	(Spain) Daniel Pedrosa	(Italy) Valentino Rossi	Report
11	28 August	Czech Republic motorcycle Grand Prix	Brno	(Switzerland) Thomas Lüthi	(Spain) Daniel Pedrosa	(Italy) Valentino Rossi	Report
12	18 September	(Japan) Japanese motorcycle Grand Prix	Motegi	(Finland) Mika Kallio	(Japan) Hiroshi Aoyama	(Italy) Loris Capirossi	Report
13	25 September	(Malaysia) Malaysian motorcycle Grand Prix	Sepang	(Switzerland) Thomas Lüthi	(Australia) Casey Stoner	(Italy) Loris Capirossi	Report
14	1 October ††	Qatar motorcycle Grand Prix	Losail	(Hungary) Gábor Talmácsi	(Australia) Casey Stoner	(Italy) Valentino Rossi	Report
15	16 October	(Australia) Australian motorcycle Grand Prix	Philip Island	(Switzerland) Thomas Lüthi	(Spain) Daniel Pedrosa	(Italy) Valentino Rossi	Report
16	23 October	(Turkey) Turkish motorcycle Grand Prix	Istanbul	(France) Mike Di Meglio	(Australia) Casey Stoner	(Italy) Marco Melandri	Report
17	6 November	Valencian Community motorcycle Grand Prix	Valencia	(Finland) Mika Kallio	(Spain) Daniel Pedrosa	(Italy) Marco Melandri	Report

† = MotoGP class only
†† = Saturday race

== Participants ==
=== MotoGP participants ===
Team	Constructor	Motorcycle	Tyres	No.	Rider	Rounds
(United Kingdom) Blata WCM	Blata	WCM	D	27	(Italy) Franco Battaini	All
(United Kingdom) Blata WCM	Blata	WCM	D	77	(United Kingdom) James Ellison	All
(Italy) Ducati Marlboro Team; Ducati Team (rd 8)	Ducati	Desmosedici GP5	B	7	(Spain) Carlos Checa	All
(Italy) Ducati Marlboro Team; Ducati Team (rd 8)	Ducati	Desmosedici GP5	B	65	(Italy) Loris Capirossi	1–15, 17
(Italy) Ducati Marlboro Team; Ducati Team (rd 8)	Ducati	Desmosedici GP5	B	23	(Japan) Shinichi Ito	16
(Italy) D'Antin MotoGP – Pramac (Italy) Team d'Antin Pramac	Ducati	Desmosedici GP4	D	44	(Italy) Roberto Rolfo	All
(Japan) Repsol Honda Team	Honda	RC211V	M	3	(Italy) Max Biaggi	All
(Japan) Repsol Honda Team	Honda	RC211V	M	69	(United States) Nicky Hayden	All
(Italy) Movistar Honda MotoGP	Honda	RC211V	M	15	(Spain) Sete Gibernau	All
(Italy) Movistar Honda MotoGP	Honda	RC211V	M	33	(Italy) Marco Melandri	All
(Spain) Camel Honda; Honda Pons (rd 8)	Honda	RC211V	M	4	(Brazil) Alex Barros	All
(Spain) Camel Honda; Honda Pons (rd 8)	Honda	RC211V	M	12	(Australia) Troy Bayliss	1–11
(Spain) Camel Honda; Honda Pons (rd 8)	Honda	RC211V	M	72	(Japan) Tohru Ukawa	12
(Spain) Camel Honda; Honda Pons (rd 8)	Honda	RC211V	M	67	(United Kingdom) Shane Byrne	13–14
(Spain) Camel Honda; Honda Pons (rd 8)	Honda	RC211V	M	17	(Australia) Chris Vermeulen	15–16
(Spain) Camel Honda; Honda Pons (rd 8)	Honda	RC211V	M	54	(Japan) Ryuichi Kiyonari	17
(Monaco) Konica Minolta Honda	Honda	RC211V	M	6	(Japan) Makoto Tamada	1–2, 5–17
(Monaco) Konica Minolta Honda	Honda	RC211V	M	16	(Netherlands) Jurgen van den Goorbergh	3–4
(Japan) Kawasaki Racing Team	Kawasaki	Ninja ZX-RR	B	56	(Japan) Shinya Nakano	All
(Japan) Kawasaki Racing Team	Kawasaki	Ninja ZX-RR	B	66	(Germany) Alex Hofmann	1, 5–12, 17
(Japan) Kawasaki Racing Team	Kawasaki	Ninja ZX-RR	B	19	(France) Olivier Jacque	3–4, 13–16
(Japan) Kawasaki Racing Team	Kawasaki	Ninja ZX-RR	B	19	(France) Olivier Jacque	10
(Japan) Moriwaki Racing	Moriwaki	MD211VF	M	72	(Japan) Tohru Ukawa	3
(Japan) Moriwaki Racing	Moriwaki	MD211VF	M	45	(Japan) Naoki Matsudo	12
(United States) Team Roberts	Proton KR	KR KTM	M	67	(United Kingdom) Shane Byrne	1–2, 4–10
(United States) Team Roberts	Proton KR	KR5	M	99	(United Kingdom) Jeremy McWilliams	11
(United States) Team Roberts	Proton KR	KR5	M	80	(United States) Kurtis Roberts	17
(Japan) Team Suzuki MotoGP; Red Bull Suzuki (rd 8)	Suzuki	GSV-R	B	10	(United States) Kenny Roberts Jr.	1–15
(Japan) Team Suzuki MotoGP; Red Bull Suzuki (rd 8)	Suzuki	GSV-R	B	9	(Japan) Nobuatsu Aoki	17
(Japan) Team Suzuki MotoGP; Red Bull Suzuki (rd 8)	Suzuki	GSV-R	B	21	(United States) John Hopkins	All
(Japan) Team Suzuki MotoGP; Red Bull Suzuki (rd 8)	Suzuki	GSV-R	B	9	(Japan) Nobuatsu Aoki	11
(Japan) Gauloises Yamaha Team; Yamaha Factory Racing (rd 8, 17)	Yamaha	YZR-M1	M	5	(United States) Colin Edwards	All
(Japan) Gauloises Yamaha Team; Yamaha Factory Racing (rd 8, 17)	Yamaha	YZR-M1	M	46	(Italy) Valentino Rossi	All
(France) Fortuna Yamaha Team	Yamaha	YZR-M1	M	11	(Spain) Rubén Xaus	All
(France) Fortuna Yamaha Team	Yamaha	YZR-M1	M	24	(Spain) Toni Elías	1–4, 8–17
(France) Fortuna Yamaha Team	Yamaha	YZR-M1	M	94	(Spain) David Checa	5–7

Key
Regular rider
Wildcard rider
Replacement rider

=== 250cc participants ===
Team	Constructor	Motorcycle	No.	Rider	Rounds
Telefónica Movistar Honda 250cc	Honda	Honda RS250RW	1	(Spain) Daniel Pedrosa	1–7, 9–17
Telefónica Movistar Honda 250cc	Honda	Honda RS250RW	73	(Japan) Hiroshi Aoyama	1–7, 9–17
Fortuna Honda	Honda	Honda RS250RW	48	(Spain) Jorge Lorenzo	1–7, 9–12, 14–17
Fortuna Honda	Honda	Honda RS250RW	80	(Spain) Héctor Barberá	1–7, 9–17
MS Aprilia Italia Corse	Aprilia	Aprilia RSV 250	5	(San Marino) Alex de Angelis	1–7, 9–17
MS Aprilia Italia Corse	Aprilia	Aprilia RSV 250	24	(Italy) Simone Corsi	1–7, 9–17
Würth Honda BQR	Honda	Honda RS250R	6	(Spain) Alex Debón	1–7, 9–17
Würth Honda BQR	Honda	Honda RS250R	14	(Australia) Anthony West	7
Würth Honda BQR	Honda	Honda RS250R	33	(Spain) Arturo Tizón	15–17
Würth Honda BQR	Honda	Honda RS250R	64	(Czech Republic) Radomil Rous	1–6, 9–14
Aprilia Aspar 250cc	Aprilia	Aprilia RSV 250	7	(France) Randy de Puniet	1–7, 9–17
Aprilia Aspar 250cc	Aprilia	Aprilia RSV 250	19	(Argentina) Sebastián Porto	1–7, 9–17
Abruzzo Racing Team	Aprilia	Aprilia RSV 250	8	(Italy) Andrea Ballerini	1–7, 9–17
Campetella Racing	Aprilia	Aprilia RSV 250	9	(France) Hugo Marchand	1–6
Campetella Racing	Aprilia	Aprilia RSV 250	25	(Italy) Alex Baldolini	1–7, 9–17
Campetella Racing	Aprilia	Aprilia RSV 250	44	(Japan) Taro Sekiguchi	9–17
Campetella Racing	Aprilia	Aprilia RSV 250	45	(Italy) Michele Danese	7
Team UGT Kurz; Team Kurz Prista Oil; Team Yamaha Kurz	Yamaha	Yamaha TZ 250	12	(Hungary) Gábor Rizmayer	1–7
Team UGT Kurz; Team Kurz Prista Oil; Team Yamaha Kurz	Yamaha	Yamaha TZ 250	16	(Germany) Franz Aschenbrenner	1–2
Team UGT Kurz; Team Kurz Prista Oil; Team Yamaha Kurz	Yamaha	Yamaha TZ 250	18	(Sweden) Frederik Watz	3–6
Team UGT Kurz; Team Kurz Prista Oil; Team Yamaha Kurz	Yamaha	Yamaha TZ 250	22	(Bulgaria) Alexander Todorov	7, 11–12
Team UGT Kurz; Team Kurz Prista Oil; Team Yamaha Kurz	Yamaha	Yamaha TZ 250	23	(Sweden) Nicklas Cajback	9–17
Team UGT Kurz; Team Kurz Prista Oil; Team Yamaha Kurz	Yamaha	Yamaha TZ 250	26	(Sweden) Andreas Mårtensson	9–10
Team UGT Kurz; Team Kurz Prista Oil; Team Yamaha Kurz	Yamaha	Yamaha TZ 250	63	(France) Erwan Nigon	13–17
Aprilia Germany	Aprilia	Aprilia RSV 250	14	(Australia) Anthony West	4
Aprilia Germany	Aprilia	Aprilia RSV 250	36	(Colombia) Martín Cárdenas	1–3, 5–7, 9–17
Aprilia Germany	Aprilia	Aprilia RSV 250	57	(United Kingdom) Chaz Davies	1–7, 9–17
Red Bull KTM GP250	KTM	KTM 250 FRR	14	(Australia) Anthony West	9–14
Carrera Sunglasses – LCR	Aprilia	Aprilia RSV 250	15	(Italy) Roberto Locatelli	1–7, 9–17
Carrera Sunglasses – LCR	Aprilia	Aprilia RSV 250	27	(Australia) Casey Stoner	1–7, 9–17
Nocable.it Race	Aprilia	Aprilia RSV 250	17	(Germany) Steve Jenkner	1–4, 6–7, 9–17
Nocable.it Race	Aprilia	Aprilia RSV 250	71	(Italy) Jarno Ronzoni	5
Scuderia Fantic Motor GP	Fantic	Yamaha-Suter 250	20	(Italy) Gabriele Ferro	1–2, 4–7, 9–17
Scuderia Fantic Motor GP	Fantic	Yamaha-Suter 250	21	(France) Arnaud Vincent	1–2, 4–7, 9–17
Kiefer-Bos-Castrol Honda	Honda	Honda RS250R	28	(Germany) Dirk Heidolf	1–5, 7, 9–17
Kiefer-Bos-Castrol Honda	Honda	Honda RS250R	63	(France) Erwan Nigon	6
Matteoni Racing	Aprilia	Aprilia RSV 250	32	(Italy) Mirko Giansanti	1–7, 9–17
Team Scot	Honda	Honda RS250RW	34	(Italy) Andrea Dovizioso	1–7, 9–17
Team Scot	Honda	Honda RS250RW	55	(Japan) Yuki Takahashi	1–7, 9–17
Equipe GP de France – Scrab	Aprilia	Aprilia RSV 250	38	(France) Grégory Leblanc	1–7, 9–11
Equipe GP de France – Scrab	Aprilia	Aprilia RSV 250	50	(France) Sylvain Guintoli	1–7, 9–17
Equipe GP de France – Scrab	Aprilia	Aprilia RSV 250	56	(France) Mathieu Gines	12–17
Arie Molenaar Racing	Honda	Honda RS250R	96	(Czech Republic) Jakub Smrž	1–7, 9–17
Mototechnic Castrol Racing	Honda	Honda RS250R	16	(Germany) Franz Aschenbrenner	10
Andalucia Mas Racing; Sebring Mas Racing; Mas Racing Team	Aprilia	Aprilia RSV 250	41	(Spain) Álvaro Molina	1–2, 5, 9–11, 17
Andalucia Mas Racing; Sebring Mas Racing; Mas Racing Team	Aprilia	Aprilia RSV 250	42	(Austria) Yves Polzer	1–2, 5, 9–10
ASMV Scaccia	Yamaha	Yamaha TZ 250	47	(France) Marc-Antoine Scaccia	4
NRG Racing	Honda	Honda RS250R	52	(Germany) Thomas Walther	10
Racing Team Benjan Motoren	Honda	Honda RS250R	53	(Germany) Patrick Lakerveld	10
Team Yamaha China Tianjian	Yamaha	Yamaha TZ 250	58	(China) Huang Shi Zhao	3
Team Yamaha China Tianjian	Yamaha	Yamaha TZ 250	62	(China) He Zi Xian	3
Chongqing Yuan XGJAO Racing	Honda	Honda RS250R	59	(China) Huang Zhi Yu	3
Zongshen Team of China	Aprilia	Aprilia RSV 250	60	(China) Wang Zhu	3, 13, 16–17
Zongshen Team of China	Aprilia	Aprilia RSV 250	61	(China) Li Zheng Peng	3–4, 13, 16–17
Zongshen Team of China	Aprilia	Aprilia RSV 250	63	(France) Erwan Nigon	4
Team Racer Bike	Honda	Honda RS250R	65	(France) Samuel Aubry	4
Jaap Kingma Racing	Aprilia	Aprilia RSV 250	66	(Netherlands) Hans Smees	7
De Arand Filart Racing	Aprilia	Aprilia RSV 250	67	(Netherlands) Randy Gevers	7
MRTT Hugen Racing	Yamaha	Yamaha TZ 250	68	(Netherlands) Jan Roelofs	7
MVS Racing Team Mikcin	Honda	Honda RS250R	69	(Netherlands) Mike Velthjzen	7
Sramek Racing Promotion	Yamaha	Yamaha TZ 250	70	(Czech Republic) Michal Filla	11
Team Harc-Pro	Honda	Honda RS250R	75	(Japan) Shuhei Aoyama	12
Team Moto Space	Yamaha	Yamaha TZ 250	77	(Japan) Mamoru Akiya	12
RT Morinokumasan Sato Jyuku	Yamaha	Yamaha TZ 250	78	(Japan) Ryuji Yokoe	12
Henkel Danke J Racing	Yamaha	Yamaha TZ 250	79	(Japan) Masaki Tokudome	12
Turramurra Cyclery Racing	Yamaha	Yamaha TZ 250	81	(Australia) Mark Rowling	15
BP Ultimate/ASF Printing	Honda	Honda RS250R	82	(Australia) Mick Kelly	15
Dydo Miu Racing Team	Honda	Honda RS250R	93	(Japan) Koki Takahashi	12

Key
Regular rider
Wildcard rider
Replacement rider

=== 125cc participants ===
Team	Constructor	Motorcycle	No.	Rider	Rounds
Nocable.it Race	Aprilia	Aprilia RS125R	6	(Spain) Joan Olivé	1–7, 9–17
Nocable.it Race	Aprilia	Aprilia RS125R	58	(Italy) Marco Simoncelli	1–7, 9–17
Ajo Motorsport	Honda	Honda RS125R	7	(France) Alexis Masbou	1–7, 9–17
Ajo Motorsport	Honda	Honda RS125R	38	(China) Cheung Wai On	3
Ajo Motorsport	Honda	Honda RS125R	71	(Japan) Tomoyoshi Koyama	1–7, 9–17
Skilled I.S.P.A. Racing Team	Aprilia	Aprilia RS125R	8	(Italy) Lorenzo Zanetti	1–2, 4–7, 9–17
Angaia Racing	Honda	Honda RS125R	9	(Japan) Toshihisa Kuzuhara	1–7, 9–15
Angaia Racing	Honda	Honda RS125R	10	(Italy) Federico Sandi	1–7, 9–17
Angaia Racing	Honda	Honda RS125R	43	(Spain) Manuel Hernández	16–17
Kiefer-Bos-Castrol Honda	Honda	Honda RS125R	11	(Germany) Sandro Cortese	1–7, 9–17
Elit Grand Prix	Honda	Honda RS125R	12	(Switzerland) Thomas Lüthi	1–7, 9–17
Red Bull KTM GP125	KTM	KTM 125 FRR	14	(Hungary) Gábor Talmácsi	1–7, 9–17
Red Bull KTM GP125	KTM	KTM 125 FRR	36	(Finland) Mika Kallio	1–7, 9–17
Red Bull KTM GP125	KTM	KTM 125 FRR	60	(Spain) Julián Simón	1–7, 9–15, 17
Malaguti Reparto Corse	Malaguti	Malaguti 125	15	(Italy) Michele Pirro	1–7, 9–15
Malaguti Reparto Corse	Malaguti	Malaguti 125	31	(Germany) Sascha Hommel	1–3, 10–13
Malaguti Reparto Corse	Malaguti	Malaguti 125	42	(Italy) Gioele Pellino	4–7, 9, 14–17
Malaguti Reparto Corse	Malaguti	Malaguti 125	89	(France) Jules Cluzel	16–17
Arie Molenaar Racing	Honda	Honda RS125R	16	(Netherlands) Raymond Schouten	1–7, 9–11
Arie Molenaar Racing	Honda	Honda RS125R	20	(Japan) Takumi Takahashi	12
Arie Molenaar Racing	Honda	Honda RS125R	31	(Germany) Sascha Hommel	14–17
Arie Molenaar Racing	Honda	Honda RS125R	38	(China) Cheung Wai On	13
Caja Madrid – Derbi Racing	Derbi	Derbi 125 GP	18	(Spain) Nicolás Terol	1–7, 9–11, 15–17
Caja Madrid – Derbi Racing	Derbi	Derbi 125 GP	22	(Spain) Pablo Nieto	1–7, 9–17
Caja Madrid – Derbi Racing	Derbi	Derbi 125 GP	51	(Spain) Enrique Jerez	12–14
Seedorf RC3 – Tiempo Holidays	Honda	Honda RS125R	19	(Spain) Álvaro Bautista	1–7, 9–17
Seedorf RC3 – Tiempo Holidays	Honda	Honda RS125R	41	(Spain) Aleix Espargaró	1–7, 9–17
Semprucci Cardion Blauer; AB Cardion Blauer USA	Aprilia	Aprilia RS125R	25	(Germany) Dario Giuseppetti	1–7, 9–17
Semprucci Cardion Blauer; AB Cardion Blauer USA	Aprilia	Aprilia RS125R	44	(Czech Republic) Karel Abraham	1–7, 9–17
Road Racing Team Hungary; Team Toth	Aprilia	Aprilia RS125R	26	(Switzerland) Vincent Braillard	1–7, 9–13, 17
Road Racing Team Hungary; Team Toth	Aprilia	Aprilia RS125R	45	(Hungary) Imre Tóth	1–7, 9–17
Road Racing Team Hungary; Team Toth	Aprilia	Aprilia RS125R	47	(Spain) Ángel Rodríguez	14–16
MVA Aspar	Aprilia	Aprilia RS125R	27	(Spain) Mateo Túnez	17
MVA Aspar	Aprilia	Aprilia RS125R	28	(Spain) Jordi Carchano	1–7, 9–17
MVA Aspar	Aprilia	Aprilia RS125R	46	(Spain) Mateo Túnez	7, 9–10, 12–16
MVA Aspar	Aprilia	Aprilia RS125R	84	(Spain) Julián Miralles	1–5, 11, 17
MVA Aspar	Aprilia	Aprilia RS125R	86	(Spain) Mateo Túnez	6
Master Aspar	Aprilia	Aprilia RS125R	33	(Spain) Sergio Gadea	1–7, 9–17
Master Aspar	Aprilia	Aprilia RS125R	55	(Spain) Héctor Faubel	1–7, 9–17
Aspar Team	Aprilia	Aprilia RS125R	86	(Spain) Mateo Túnez	1
Abruzzo Racing Team; Abruzzo Junior Team	Aprilia	Aprilia RS125R	29	(Italy) Andrea Iannone	1–7, 9–17
Abruzzo Racing Team; Abruzzo Junior Team	Aprilia	Aprilia RS125R	62	(Italy) Simone Grotzkyj	5
Kopron Racing World	Honda	Honda RS125R	32	(Italy) Fabrizio Lai	1–7, 9–17
Kopron Racing World	Honda	Honda RS125R	63	(France) Mike Di Meglio	1–7, 9–17
Matteoni Racing	Aprilia	Aprilia RS125R	35	(Italy) Raffaele De Rosa	1–7, 9–17
Totti Top Sport – NGS	Aprilia	Aprilia RS125R	43	(Spain) Manuel Hernández	1–7, 9–15
Totti Top Sport – NGS	Aprilia	Aprilia RS125R	49	(Spain) Daniel Sáez	1
Totti Top Sport – NGS	Aprilia	Aprilia RS125R	49	(Spain) Daniel Sáez	16–17
Totti Top Sport – NGS	Aprilia	Aprilia RS125R	75	(Italy) Mattia Pasini	1–7, 9–17
LG Mobile Galicia Team	Honda	Honda RS125R	47	(Spain) Ángel Rodríguez	1–7, 9–10
LG Mobile Galicia Team	Honda	Honda RS125R	48	(Spain) David Bonache	1
LG Mobile Galicia Team	Honda	Honda RS125R	48	(Spain) David Bonache	11–17
Metis Racing Team	Derbi	Derbi 125 GP	52	(Czech Republic) Lukáš Pešek	1–7, 9–17
Metis Racing Team	Gilera	Gilera 125 GP	54	(San Marino) Manuel Poggiali	1–7, 9–17
Motorrad Unger Racing	Aprilia	Aprilia RS125R	13	(Germany) Patrick Unger	10
Litjens Racing	Honda	Honda RS125R	37	(Netherlands) Joey Litjens	7
Zongshen Racing Team	Honda	Honda RS125R	39	(China) Chow Ho-Wan	3
3C Racing Junior	Aprilia	Aprilia RS125R	49	(Spain) Daniel Sáez	6
Motospeed	Honda	Honda RS125R	50	(Portugal) Carlos Ferreira	2
Team Stop & Go	Derbi	Derbi 125 GP	51	(Spain) Enrique Jerez	6, 17
E3 Motorsport	Honda	Honda RS125R	56	(United Kingdom) Christian Elkin	9
www.spi2racing.com	Honda	Honda RS125R	57	(United Kingdom) Rob Guiver	9
Würth Honda BQR	Honda	Honda RS125R	59	(Spain) Esteve Rabat	17
Kuja Racing	Honda	Honda RS125R	61	(Italy) Michele Conti	5
Hamamoto Racing Team	Honda	Honda RS125R	64	(Japan) Yuki Hamamoto	12
Club Plus One	Honda	Honda RS125R	65	(Japan) Hiroomi Iwata	12
Team Harc-Pro	Honda	Honda RS125R	66	(Japan) Arata Mori	12
Team Harc-Pro	Honda	Honda RS125R	67	(Japan) Kazuki Hanafusa	12
Jha Racing	Honda	Honda RS125R	68	(Japan) Hiroaki Kuzuhara	12
Leigh-Smith Racing	Honda	Honda RS125R	69	(Australia) Blake Leigh-Smith	15
Angelo's Aluminium Racing	Honda	Honda RS125R	70	(Australia) Brent Rigoli	15
Yamaha Indonesia	Yamaha	Yamaha TZ125	72	(Indonesia) Doni Tata Pradita	13
TVX Racing	Honda	Honda RS125R	73	(France) Yannick Deschamps	4
Tecmas Balladins Racing	Honda	Honda RS125R	74	(France) Mathieu Gines	4
Red Bull ADAC KTM Juniors	KTM	KTM 125 FRR	76	(Austria) Michael Ranseder	6–7, 10–11
Red Bull ADAC KTM Juniors	KTM	KTM 125 FRR	77	(Germany) Stefan Bradl	6, 10–11
Varenhof Racing Team	Aprilia	Aprilia RS125R	78	(Netherlands) Hugo van den Berg	6–7, 10
Jan Bakker Auto's Elburg	Honda	Honda RS125R	79	(Netherlands) Gert-Jan Kok	7
Racing Team Mark Van Kreij	Honda	Honda RS125R	80	(Netherlands) Mark van Kreij	7
Allect Racing	Honda	Honda RS125R	81	(Australia) Tom Hatton	15
Scott Racing	Honda	Honda RS125R	82	(Australia) Candice Scott	15
JBD Racing	Honda	Honda RS125R	83	(Australia) Rhys Moller	15
Chongqing Yuan XGJAO Racing	Honda	Honda RS125R	85	(China) Zhou You Rao	3
OMV Team Hanusch; Hanusch Motopromotion	Honda	Honda RS125R	87	(Czech Republic) Patrik Vostárek	1–2, 11
Equipe de France Espoire	Honda	Honda RS125R	88	(France) Matthieu Lussiana	4
Teams RMS Bigstore	Honda	Honda RS125R	89	(France) Jules Cluzel	4
Teams RMS Bigstore	Honda	Honda RS125R	90	(France) Michel Alexis	4
RCGM Team FMI	Aprilia	Aprilia RS125R	91	(Italy) Lorenzo Baroni	5
RCGM Team FMI	Aprilia	Aprilia RS125R	92	(Italy) Luca Verdini	5
Racing Service	Honda	Honda RS125R	93	(Italy) Nico Vivarelli	5
KRP/teamlinfootracing.com; KRP/sunnybeachvillas.com	Honda	Honda RS125R	94	(United Kingdom) Dan Linfoot	9
KRP/teamlinfootracing.com; KRP/sunnybeachvillas.com	Honda	Honda RS125R	95	(United Kingdom) James Westmoreland	9
UK1 Racing	Honda	Honda RS125R	96	(United Kingdom) Kev Coghlan	9
Heron Racing Team	Honda	Honda RS125R	97	(Czech Republic) Lukáš Razek	11
ADAC Sachsen Juniors	Honda	Honda RS125R	98	(Germany) Manuel Mickan	10
Mayer Racing Passau	Aprilia	Aprilia RS125R	99	(Germany) Thomas Mayer	11

Key
Regular rider
Wildcard rider
Replacement rider

== Standings ==
=== MotoGP standings ===
Scoring system

Points were awarded to the top fifteen finishers. A rider had to finish the race to earn points.

Position	**1st**	**2nd**	**3rd**	**4th**	**5th**	**6th**	**7th**	**8th**	**9th**	**10th**	**11th**	**12th**	**13th**	**14th**	**15th**
Points	25	20	16	13	11	10	9	8	7	6	5	4	3	2	1

==== Riders' standings ====
- Rounds marked with a light blue background were under wet race conditions or stopped by rain.
- Riders marked with light blue background were eligible for Rookie of the Year awards.

Pos	Rider	Bike	Team	SPA (Spain)	POR (Portugal)	CHN (China)	FRA (France)	ITA (Italy)	CAT (Catalonia)	NED (Netherlands)	USA (United States)	GBR (United Kingdom)	GER (Germany)	CZE (Czech Republic)	JPN (Japan)	MAL (Malaysia)	QAT (Qatar)	AUS (Australia)	TUR (Turkey)	VAL (Valencian Community)	Pts
1	(Italy) Valentino Rossi	Yamaha	Gauloises Yamaha Team	**1**	2	1	**1**	**1**	1	**1**	3	**1**	1	1	Ret	2	1	1	2	3	367
2	(Italy) Marco Melandri	Honda	Movistar Honda MotoGP	3	4	3	4	4	3	2	Ret	Ret	7	6	Ret	5	2	4	1	1	220
3	(United States) Nicky Hayden	Honda	Repsol Honda Team	Ret	7	9	6	6	5	4	**1**	Ret	**3**	5	7	4	3	**2**	3	2	206
4	(United States) Colin Edwards	Yamaha	Gauloises Yamaha Team	9	6	8	3	9	7	3	2	4	8	7	6	10	4	6	7	8	179
5	(Italy) Max Biaggi	Honda	Repsol Honda Team	7	3	5	5	2	6	6	4	Ret	4	3	2	6	Ret	Ret	12	6	173
6	(Italy) Loris Capirossi	Ducati	Ducati Marlboro Team	13	9	12	7	3	12	10	10	6	9	2	**1**	**1**	**10**	WD		7	157
7	(Spain) Sete Gibernau	Honda	Movistar Honda MotoGP	2	Ret	**4**	2	Ret	**2**	5	5	Ret	2	**Ret**	Ret	Ret	5	5	**4**	**Ret**	150
8	(Brazil) Alex Barros	Honda	Camel Honda	4	**1**	11	Ret	7	4	7	Ret	3	5	4	Ret	8	9	Ret	9	5	147
9	(Spain) Carlos Checa	Ducati	Ducati Marlboro Team	10	5	Ret	Ret	5	11	9	Ret	5	Ret	8	4	3	6	3	5	4	138
10	(Japan) Shinya Nakano	Kawasaki	Kawasaki Racing Team	5	8	Ret	8	10	9	8	9	Ret	6	12	Ret	Ret	7	7	10	11	98
11	(Japan) Makoto Tamada	Honda	Konica Minolta Honda	8	DNS			8	Ret	14	7	7	10	10	3	12	Ret	8	8	9	91
12	(Spain) Toni Elías	Yamaha	Fortuna Yamaha Team	12	14	14	9				13	9	12	14	9	11	8	9	6	10	74
13	(United States) Kenny Roberts Jr.	Suzuki	Team Suzuki MotoGP	Ret	12	Ret	13	15	15	16	14	2	11	11	8	7	11	WD			63
14	(United States) John Hopkins	Suzuki	Team Suzuki MotoGP	14	Ret	7	16	11	Ret	13	8	11	Ret	13	5	9	17	10	15	13	63
15	(Australia) Troy Bayliss	Honda	Camel Honda	6	11	Ret	10	13	8	11	6	Ret	Ret	9							54
16	(Spain) Rubén Xaus	Yamaha	Fortuna Yamaha Team	18	10	10	12	14	10	12	11	Ret	13	18	10	15	14	12	14	15	52
17	(France) Olivier Jacque	Kawasaki	Kawasaki Racing Team			2	11						Ret			Ret		16	13		28
18	(Italy) Roberto Rolfo	Ducati	Team d'Antin Pramac	15	13	16	15	17	14	18	Ret	10	14	17	Ret	13	12	13	16	Ret	25
19	(Germany) Alex Hofmann	Kawasaki	Kawasaki Racing Team	11				12	17	Ret	12	8	Ret	15	Ret					14	24
20	(Netherlands) Jurgen van den Goorbergh	Honda	Konica Minolta Honda			6	14														12
21	(Australia) Chris Vermeulen	Honda	Camel Honda															11	11		10
22	(Italy) Franco Battaini	Blata	Blata WCM	17	Ret	Ret	17	18	19	20	17	Ret	15	20	11	16	16	15	17	16	7
23	(United Kingdom) James Ellison	Blata	Blata WCM	16	15	13	Ret	Ret	18	19	16	Ret	Ret	19	DNS	Ret	15	14	18	Ret	7
24	(United Kingdom) Shane Byrne	Proton KR	Team Roberts	Ret	16		Ret	16	16	17	15	Ret	Ret								6
24	(United Kingdom) Shane Byrne	Honda	Camel Honda													14	13				6
25	(Japan) Ryuichi Kiyonari	Honda	Camel Honda																	12	4
26	(Spain) David Checa	Yamaha	Fortuna Yamaha Team					19	13	15											4
27	(Japan) Tohru Ukawa	Moriwaki	Moriwaki Racing			15															1
27	(Japan) Tohru Ukawa	Honda	Camel Honda												Ret						1
	(Japan) Nobuatsu Aoki	Suzuki	Team Suzuki MotoGP											16						Ret	0
	(United Kingdom) Jeremy McWilliams	Proton KR	Team Roberts											Ret							0
	(Japan) Naoki Matsudo	Moriwaki	Moriwaki Racing												Ret						0
	(United States) Kurtis Roberts	Proton KR	Team Roberts																	Ret	0
	(Japan) Shinichi Ito	Ducati	Ducati Marlboro Team																DSQ		0
Pos	Rider	Bike	Team	SPA (Spain)	POR (Portugal)	CHN (China)	FRA (France)	ITA (Italy)	CAT (Catalonia)	NED (Netherlands)	USA (United States)	GBR (United Kingdom)	GER (Germany)	CZE (Czech Republic)	JPN (Japan)	MAL (Malaysia)	QAT (Qatar)	AUS (Australia)	TUR (Turkey)	VAL (Valencian Community)	Pts

Colour	Result
Gold	Winner
Silver	Second place
Bronze	Third place
Green	Points classification
Blue	Non-points classification
Blue	Non-classified finish (NC)
Purple	Retired, not classified (Ret)
Red	Did not qualify (DNQ)
Red	Did not pre-qualify (DNPQ)
Black	Disqualified (DSQ)
White	Did not start (DNS)
White	Withdrew (WD)
White	Race cancelled (C)
Blank	Did not practice (DNP)
Blank	Did not arrive (DNA)
Blank	Excluded (EX)

**Bold** – Pole position
Italics – Fastest lap

==== Constructors' standings ====
- Each constructor got the same number of points as their best placed rider in each race.
- Rounds marked with a light blue background were under wet race conditions or stopped by rain.

Pos	Constructor	SPA (Spain)	POR (Portugal)	CHN (China)	FRA (France)	ITA (Italy)	CAT (Catalonia)	NED (Netherlands)	USA (United States)	GBR (United Kingdom)	GER (Germany)	CZE (Czech Republic)	JPN (Japan)	MAL (Malaysia)	QAT (Qatar)	AUS (Australia)	TUR (Turkey)	VAL (Valencian Community)	Pts
1	(Japan) Yamaha	1	2	1	1	1	1	1	2	1	1	1	6	2	1	1	2	3	381
2	(Japan) Honda	2	1	3	2	2	2	2	1	3	2	3	2	4	2	2	1	1	341
3	(Italy) Ducati	10	5	12	7	3	11	9	10	5	9	2	1	1	6	3	5	4	202
4	(Japan) Kawasaki	5	8	2	8	10	9	8	9	8	6	12	Ret	Ret	7	7	10	11	126
5	(Japan) Suzuki	14	12	7	13	11	15	13	8	2	11	11	5	7	11	10	15	13	100
6	(Czech Republic) Blata	16	15	13	17	18	18	19	16	Ret	15	19	11	16	15	14	17	16	13
7	(Malaysia) / (United States) Proton KR	Ret	16		Ret	16	16	17	15	Ret	Ret	Ret						Ret	1
8	(Japan) Moriwaki			15									Ret						1
Pos	Constructor	SPA (Spain)	POR (Portugal)	CHN (China)	FRA (France)	ITA (Italy)	CAT (Catalonia)	NED (Netherlands)	USA (United States)	GBR (United Kingdom)	GER (Germany)	CZE (Czech Republic)	JPN (Japan)	MAL (Malaysia)	QAT (Qatar)	AUS (Australia)	TUR (Turkey)	VAL (Valencian Community)	Pts

==== Teams' standings ====
- Each team got the total points scored by their two riders, including replacement riders. In one rider team, only the points scored by that rider was counted. Wildcard riders did not score points.
- Rounds marked with a light blue background were under wet race conditions or stopped by rain.

Pos	Team	Bike No.	SPA (Spain)	POR (Portugal)	CHN (China)	FRA (France)	ITA (Italy)	CAT (Catalonia)	NED (Netherlands)	USA (United States)	GBR (United Kingdom)	GER (Germany)	CZE (Czech Republic)	JPN (Japan)	MAL (Malaysia)	QAT (Qatar)	AUS (Australia)	TUR (Turkey)	VAL (Valencian Community)	Pts
1	(Japan) Gauloises Yamaha Team	5	9	6	8	3	9	7	3	2	4	8	7	6	10	4	6	7	8	546
1	(Japan) Gauloises Yamaha Team	46	**1**	2	1	**1**	**1**	1	**1**	3	**1**	1	1	Ret	2	1	1	2	3	546
2	(Japan) Repsol Honda Team	3	7	3	5	5	2	6	6	4	Ret	4	3	2	6	Ret	Ret	12	6	379
2	(Japan) Repsol Honda Team	69	Ret	7	9	6	6	5	4	**1**	Ret	**3**	5	7	4	3	**2**	3	2	379
3	(Italy) Movistar Honda MotoGP	15	2	Ret	**4**	2	Ret	**2**	5	5	Ret	2	**Ret**	Ret	Ret	5	5	**4**	**Ret**	370
3	(Italy) Movistar Honda MotoGP	33	3	4	3	4	4	3	2	Ret	Ret	7	6	Ret	5	2	4	1	1	370
4	(Italy) Ducati Marlboro Team	7	10	5	Ret	Ret	5	11	9	Ret	5	Ret	8	4	3	6	3	5	4	295
4	(Italy) Ducati Marlboro Team	23																DSQ		295
4	(Italy) Ducati Marlboro Team	65	13	9	12	7	3	12	10	10	6	9	2	**1**	**1**	**10**	WD		7	295
5	(Spain) Camel Honda	4	4	**1**	11	Ret	7	4	7	Ret	3	5	4	Ret	8	9	Ret	9	5	220
5	(Spain) Camel Honda	12	6	11	Ret	10	13	8	11	6	Ret	Ret	9							220
5	(Spain) Camel Honda	17															11	11		220
5	(Spain) Camel Honda	54																	12	220
5	(Spain) Camel Honda	67													14	13				220
5	(Spain) Camel Honda	72												Ret						220
6	(Japan) Kawasaki Racing Team	19			2	11									Ret		18	13		150
6	(Japan) Kawasaki Racing Team	56	5	8	Ret	8	10	9	8	9	Ret	6	12	Ret	Ret	7	7	10	11	150
6	(Japan) Kawasaki Racing Team	66	11				12	17	Ret	12	8	Ret	15	Ret					14	150
7	(France) Fortuna Yamaha Team	11	18	10	10	12	14	10	12	11	Ret	13	18	10	15	14	12	14	15	130
7	(France) Fortuna Yamaha Team	24	12	14	14	9				13	9	12	14	9	11	8	9	6	10	130
7	(France) Fortuna Yamaha Team	94					19	13	15											130
8	(Japan) Team Suzuki MotoGP	9																	Ret	126
8	(Japan) Team Suzuki MotoGP	10	Ret	12	Ret	13	15	15	16	14	2	11	11	8	7	11	WD			126
8	(Japan) Team Suzuki MotoGP	21	14	Ret	7	16	11	Ret	13	8	11	Ret	13	5	9	17	10	15	13	126
9	(Monaco) Konica Minolta Honda	6	8	DNS			8	Ret	14	7	7	10	10	3	12	Ret	8	8	9	103
9	(Monaco) Konica Minolta Honda	16			6	14														103
10	(Italy) Team d'Antin Pramac	44	15	13	16	15	17	14	18	Ret	10	14	17	Ret	13	12	13	16	Ret	25
11	(United Kingdom) Blata WCM	27	17	Ret	Ret	17	18	19	20	17	Ret	15	20	11	16	16	15	17	16	14
11	(United Kingdom) Blata WCM	77	16	15	13	Ret	Ret	18	19	16	Ret	Ret	19	DNS	Ret	15	14	18	Ret	14
12	(United States) Team Roberts	67	Ret	16		Ret	16	16	17	15	Ret	Ret								1
12	(United States) Team Roberts	80																	Ret	1
12	(United States) Team Roberts	99											Ret							1
Pos	Team	Bike No.	SPA (Spain)	POR (Portugal)	CHN (China)	FRA (France)	ITA (Italy)	CAT (Catalonia)	NED (Netherlands)	USA (United States)	GBR (United Kingdom)	GER (Germany)	CZE (Czech Republic)	JPN (Japan)	MAL (Malaysia)	QAT (Qatar)	AUS (Australia)	TUR (Turkey)	VAL (Valencian Community)	Pts

=== 250cc standings ===
Scoring system

Points were awarded to the top fifteen finishers. A rider had to finish the race to earn points.

Position	**1st**	**2nd**	**3rd**	**4th**	**5th**	**6th**	**7th**	**8th**	**9th**	**10th**	**11th**	**12th**	**13th**	**14th**	**15th**
Points	25	20	16	13	11	10	9	8	7	6	5	4	3	2	1

==== Riders' standings ====
- Rounds marked with a light blue background were under wet race conditions or stopped by rain.
- Riders marked with light blue background were eligible for Rookie of the Year awards.

Pos	Rider	Bike	SPA (Spain)	POR (Portugal)	CHN (China)	FRA (France)	ITA (Italy)	CAT (Catalonia)	NED (Netherlands)	GBR (United Kingdom)	GER (Germany)	CZE (Czech Republic)	JPN (Japan)	MAL (Malaysia)	QAT (Qatar)	AUS (Australia)	TUR (Turkey)	VAL (Valencian Community)	Pts
1	(Spain) Daniel Pedrosa	Honda	**1**	4	6	**1**	1	**1**	2	**4**	1	1	2	Ret	4	1	2	**1**	309
2	(Australia) Casey Stoner	Aprilia	Ret	1	**1**	4	4	2	6	3	7	3	3	1	1	**Ret**	1	3	254
3	(Italy) Andrea Dovizioso	Honda	4	2	2	3	8	3	7	7	4	6	6	Ret	3	5	5	9	189
4	(Japan) Hiroshi Aoyama	Honda	Ret	6	3	6	7	4	4	Ret	3	5	**1**	**5**	6	6	3	6	180
5	(Spain) Jorge Lorenzo	Honda	6	10	9	5	**2**	Ret	**3**	8	Ret	**2**	Ret		**2**	3	4	2	167
6	(Argentina) Sebastián Porto	Aprilia	2	9	5	Ret	5	Ret	1	5	5	7	Ret	3	5	2	Ret	DNS	152
7	(San Marino) Alex de Angelis	Aprilia	3	5	4	Ret	3	Ret	5	Ret	**2**	4	7	2	Ret	Ret	**7**	4	151
8	(France) Randy de Puniet	Aprilia	Ret	**3**	18	2	Ret	6	8	1	6	8	5	4	Ret	7	Ret	8	138
9	(Spain) Héctor Barberá	Honda	5	11	7	7	6	16	9	Ret	8	Ret	8	6	**7**	4	6	5	120
10	(France) Sylvain Guintoli	Aprilia	Ret	8	12	9	Ret	8	12	9	11	10	10	9	9	10	9	14	84
11	(Japan) Yuki Takahashi	Honda	Ret	7	10	10	Ret	7	15	Ret	9	Ret	4	7	8	Ret	Ret	7	77
12	(Spain) Alex Debón	Honda	8	13	11	8	Ret	11	13	Ret	12	13	9	Ret	11	9	12	11	67
13	(Italy) Roberto Locatelli	Aprilia	7	Ret	16	14	Ret	12	11	Ret	11	9	Ret	8	Ret	8	8	10	61
14	(Italy) Simone Corsi	Aprilia	9	17	8	11	9	5	10	6	Ret	Ret	11	Ret	17	16	Ret	Ret	59
15	(Italy) Mirko Giansanti	Aprilia	10	14	Ret	17	12	9	18	11	17	17	13	13	12	18	14	19	36
16	(United Kingdom) Chaz Davies	Aprilia	11	Ret	Ret	12	10	Ret	14	Ret	Ret	Ret	Ret	12	16	11	10	16	32
17	(Australia) Anthony West	Aprilia				18													30
17	(Australia) Anthony West	Honda							Ret										30
17	(Australia) Anthony West	KTM								2	10	12	Ret	Ret	DNS				30
18	(Italy) Alex Baldolini	Aprilia	13	Ret	13	13	Ret	10	Ret	13	Ret	23	14	Ret	20	Ret	11	18	25
19	(Italy) Andrea Ballerini	Aprilia	14	18	Ret	15	11	Ret	17	10	Ret	16	Ret	Ret	15	15	13	Ret	19
20	(Czech Republic) Jakub Smrž	Honda	Ret	12	14	16	Ret	Ret	16	16	16	11	Ret	19	Ret	13	15	12	19
21	(Japan) Taro Sekiguchi	Aprilia								Ret	18	Ret	Ret	10	10	Ret	Ret	15	13
22	(Germany) Dirk Heidolf	Honda	Ret	16	15	Ret	Ret		Ret	13	20	Ret	18	11	18	12	16	Ret	13
23	(Germany) Steve Jenkner	Aprilia	Ret	WD	Ret	Ret		19	Ret	17	14	15	12	14	14	14	Ret	17	13
24	(Czech Republic) Radomil Rous	Honda	12	19	Ret	21	13	DNS		15	20	14	15	Ret	Ret				11
25	(Colombia) Martín Cárdenas	Aprilia	Ret	15	DNS		17	17	21	Ret	15	19	17	15	13	17	Ret	13	9
26	(France) Grégory Leblanc	Aprilia	15	Ret	Ret	19	14	15	20	14	Ret	21							6
27	(France) Erwan Nigon	Aprilia				20													3
27	(France) Erwan Nigon	Honda						13											3
27	(France) Erwan Nigon	Yamaha												16	Ret	Ret	19	Ret	3
28	(France) Hugo Marchand	Aprilia	Ret	Ret	DNQ	DNS	15	14											3
	(Spain) Álvaro Molina	Aprilia	Ret	Ret			16			18	19	20						Ret	0
	(Hungary) Gábor Rizmayer	Yamaha	16	20	19	22	Ret	20	25										0
	(Japan) Kouki Takahashi	Yamaha											16						0
	(France) Mathieu Gines	Aprilia											21	17	19	20	17	20	0
	(Sweden) Frederik Watz	Yamaha			17	Ret	Ret	18											0
	(Spain) Arturo Tizón	Honda														19	18	Ret	0
	(Sweden) Nicklas Cajback	Yamaha								DNQ	22	24	DNQ	18	DNQ	DNQ	21	DNQ	0
	(France) Arnaud Vincent	Fantic	Ret	Ret		DNQ	Ret	Ret	24	Ret	Ret	18	Ret	Ret	Ret	Ret	Ret	Ret	0
	(Italy) Jarno Ronzoni	Aprilia					18												0
	(Italy) Gabriele Ferro	Fantic	DNQ	DNQ		DNQ	DNQ	21	DNQ	19	DNQ	DNQ	DNQ	DNQ	DNQ	DNQ	DNQ	DNQ	0
	(Japan) Mamoru Akiya	Yamaha											19						0
	(China) Li Zheng Peng	Aprilia			DNQ	DNQ								DNQ			20	21	0
	(China) He Zi Xian	Yamaha			20														0
	(Japan) Masaki Tokudome	Yamaha											20						0
	(Austria) Yves Polzer	Aprilia	DNQ	21			Ret			Ret	DNQ								0
	(China) Huang Shi Zhao	Yamaha			21														0
	(Sweden) Andreas Mårtensson	Yamaha								EX	21								0
	(Italy) Michele Danese	Aprilia							22										0
	(Czech Republic) Michal Filla	Yamaha										22							0
	(Netherlands) Hans Smees	Aprilia							23										0
	(Germany) Thomas Walther	Honda									23								0
	(China) Wang Zhu	Aprilia			DNQ									DNQ			Ret	Ret	0
	(Germany) Franz Aschenbrenner	Yamaha	DNQ	DNQ															0
	(Germany) Franz Aschenbrenner	Honda									Ret								0
	(Japan) Ryuji Yokoe	Yamaha											Ret						0
	(Japan) Shuhei Aoyama	Yamaha											Ret						0
	(Netherlands) Randy Gevers	Aprilia							DNS										0
	(Bulgaria) Alexander Todorov	Yamaha							DNQ			DNQ	DNQ						0
	(China) Huang Zhi Yu	Honda			DNQ														0
	(France) Marc-Antoine Scaccia	Yamaha				DNQ													0
	(France) Samuel Aubry	Honda				DNQ													0
	(Netherlands) Jan Roelofs	Yamaha							DNQ										0
	(Netherlands) Mike Velthjzen	Honda							DNQ										0
	(Germany) Patrick Lakerveld	Honda									DNQ								0
	(Australia) Mark Rowling	Yamaha														DNQ			0
	(Australia) Mick Kelly	Honda														DNQ			0
Pos	Rider	Bike	SPA (Spain)	POR (Portugal)	CHN (China)	FRA (France)	ITA (Italy)	CAT (Catalonia)	NED (Netherlands)	GBR (United Kingdom)	GER (Germany)	CZE (Czech Republic)	JPN (Japan)	MAL (Malaysia)	QAT (Qatar)	AUS (Australia)	TUR (Turkey)	VAL (Valencian Community)	Pts

Colour	Result
Gold	Winner
Silver	Second place
Bronze	Third place
Green	Points classification
Blue	Non-points classification
Blue	Non-classified finish (NC)
Purple	Retired, not classified (Ret)
Red	Did not qualify (DNQ)
Red	Did not pre-qualify (DNPQ)
Black	Disqualified (DSQ)
White	Did not start (DNS)
White	Withdrew (WD)
White	Race cancelled (C)
Blank	Did not practice (DNP)
Blank	Did not arrive (DNA)
Blank	Excluded (EX)

**Bold** – Pole position
Italics – Fastest lap

==== Constructors' standings ====
- Each constructor got the same number of points as their best placed rider in each race.
- Rounds marked with a light blue background were under wet race conditions or stopped by rain.

Pos	Constructor	SPA (Spain)	POR (Portugal)	CHN (China)	FRA (France)	ITA (Italy)	CAT (Catalonia)	NED (Netherlands)	GBR (United Kingdom)	GER (Germany)	CZE (Czech Republic)	JPN (Japan)	MAL (Malaysia)	QAT (Qatar)	AUS (Australia)	TUR (Turkey)	VAL (Valencian Community)	Pts
1	(Japan) Honda	1	2	2	1	1	1	2	4	1	1	1	5	2	1	2	1	349
2	(Italy) Aprilia	2	1	1	2	3	2	1	1	2	3	3	1	1	2	1	3	339
3	(Austria) KTM								2	10	12	Ret	Ret	DNS				30
	(Japan) Yamaha	16	20	17	22	Ret	18	25	DSQ	21	24	19	16	Ret	Ret	19	Ret	0
	(Italy) Fantic	Ret	Ret		DNQ	Ret	21	24	19	Ret	18	Ret	Ret	Ret	Ret	Ret	Ret	0
Pos	Constructor	SPA (Spain)	POR (Portugal)	CHN (China)	FRA (France)	ITA (Italy)	CAT (Catalonia)	NED (Netherlands)	GBR (United Kingdom)	GER (Germany)	CZE (Czech Republic)	JPN (Japan)	MAL (Malaysia)	QAT (Qatar)	AUS (Australia)	TUR (Turkey)	VAL (Valencian Community)	Pts

=== 125cc standings ===
Scoring system

Points were awarded to the top fifteen finishers. A rider had to finish the race to earn points.

Position	**1st**	**2nd**	**3rd**	**4th**	**5th**	**6th**	**7th**	**8th**	**9th**	**10th**	**11th**	**12th**	**13th**	**14th**	**15th**
Points	25	20	16	13	11	10	9	8	7	6	5	4	3	2	1

==== Riders' standings ====
- Rounds marked with a light blue background were under wet race conditions or stopped by rain.
- Riders marked with light blue background were eligible for Rookie of the Year awards.

Pos	Rider	Bike	SPA (Spain)	POR (Portugal)	CHN (China)	FRA (France)	ITA (Italy)	CAT (Catalonia)	NED (Netherlands)	GBR (United Kingdom)	GER (Germany)	CZE (Czech Republic)	JPN (Japan)	MAL (Malaysia)	QAT (Qatar)	AUS (Australia)	TUR (Turkey)	VAL (Valencian Community)	Pts
1	(Switzerland) Thomas Lüthi	Honda	Ret	3	4	**1**	2	7	10	6	2	**1**	2	**1**	6	**1**	**5**	9	242
2	(Finland) Mika Kallio	KTM	2	**1**	**11**	3	**Ret**	**3**	**Ret**	**7**	**1**	2	1	2	**2**	5	Ret	1	237
3	(Hungary) Gábor Talmácsi	KTM	5	Ret	3	6	1	4	1	Ret	4	9	**Ret**	5	1	7	4	2	198
4	(Italy) Mattia Pasini	Aprilia	4	8	1	DNS	4	1	3	Ret	Ret	Ret	5	3	9	4	2	3	183
5	(Italy) Marco Simoncelli	Aprilia	**1**	10	6	5	Ret	2	20	4	3	3	Ret	9	3	3	6	5	177
6	(Italy) Fabrizio Lai	Honda	3	4	2	Ret	8	10	18	3	7	6	10	7	10	12	7	7	141
7	(Spain) Julián Simón	KTM	9	9	10	8	7	8	6	1	5	10	Ret	6	8	Ret		8	123
8	(Japan) Tomoyoshi Koyama	Honda	Ret	6	5	Ret	5	5	7	Ret	Ret	Ret	4	10	14	2	3	6	119
9	(Spain) Héctor Faubel	Aprilia	7	2	15	Ret	Ret	Ret	2	Ret	Ret	Ret	3	4	5	6	Ret	4	113
10	(San Marino) Manuel Poggiali	Gilera	6	5	12	10	6	6	8	25	11	8	6	8	7	13	11	Ret	107
11	(France) Mike Di Meglio	Honda	11	11	20	4	Ret	16	14	2	Ret	7	11	11	4	14	1	Ret	104
12	(Spain) Sergio Gadea	Aprilia	Ret	20	29	2	Ret	13	9	11	Ret	4	7	16	12	9	Ret	**Ret**	68
13	(Spain) Pablo Nieto	Derbi	12	12	8	7	22	Ret	11	5	10	16	8	13	Ret	18	20	10	64
14	(Spain) Joan Olivé	Aprilia	8	18	14	Ret	3	Ret	13	8	8	22	18	17	11	15	9	14	60
15	(Spain) Álvaro Bautista	Honda	Ret	7	17	Ret	12	14	4	Ret	Ret	12	9	26	22	16	12	12	47
16	(Spain) Aleix Espargaró	Honda	14	16	7	12	17	15	Ret	Ret	9	13	12	15	18	17	17	11	36
17	(Italy) Lorenzo Zanetti	Aprilia	Ret	DNS		11	14	9	19	14	13	5	17	20	16	20	Ret	Ret	30
18	(France) Alexis Masbou	Honda	Ret	13	21	Ret	10	Ret	5	Ret	DSQ	Ret	20	14	20	10	Ret	Ret	28
19	(Czech Republic) Lukáš Pešek	Derbi	Ret	Ret	9	Ret	Ret	Ret	15	Ret	6	Ret	Ret	12	Ret	Ret	13	Ret	25
20	(Italy) Andrea Iannone	Aprilia	21	26	18	23	16	11	26	Ret	Ret	11	13	18	19	Ret	10	15	20
21	(Japan) Toshihisa Kuzuhara	Honda	Ret	14	16	DNS	9	21	Ret	10	Ret	DNS	14	Ret	27	21			17
22	(Spain) Ángel Rodríguez	Honda	Ret	21	Ret	Ret	Ret	20	22	Ret	Ret								16
22	(Spain) Ángel Rodríguez	Aprilia													Ret	8	8		16
23	(Italy) Raffaele De Rosa	Aprilia	Ret	24	28	20	15	22	Ret	20	15	17	16	Ret	13	11	Ret	13	13
24	(Spain) Manuel Hernández	Aprilia	10	15	Ret	14	13	26	17	Ret	23	20	19	24	Ret	22			12
24	(Spain) Manuel Hernández	Honda															25	19	12
25	(Austria) Michael Ranseder	KTM						12	12		12	Ret							12
26	(Germany) Sandro Cortese	Honda	20	25	Ret	15	Ret	23	24	15	14	14	Ret	21	17	19	14	Ret	8
27	(Hungary) Imre Tóth	Aprilia	16	22	30	9	25	Ret	25	26	20	18	21	22	29	Ret	24	21	7
28	(United Kingdom) Dan Linfoot	Honda								9									7
29	(Spain) Jordi Carchano	Aprilia	13	17	22	Ret	23	27	28	13	26	Ret	30	28	25	25	19	17	6
30	(Italy) Michele Conti	Honda					11												5
31	(United Kingdom) Christian Elkin	Honda								12									4
32	(Germany) Dario Giuseppetti	Aprilia	Ret	29	Ret	13	18	17	23	DNS	18	Ret	Ret	23	21	26	15	Ret	4
33	(Italy) Michele Pirro	Malaguti	Ret	19	13	Ret	19	Ret	Ret	Ret	Ret	Ret	Ret	Ret	Ret	Ret			3
34	(Spain) Enrique Jerez	Derbi						Ret					15	19	15			18	2
35	(Spain) Nicolás Terol	Derbi	15	23	26	22	21	Ret	16	21	Ret	19				Ret	16	16	1
36	(Germany) Stefan Bradl	KTM						Ret			16	15							1
	(Netherlands) Raymond Schouten	Honda	23	30	19	24	26	25	Ret	16	Ret	Ret							0
	(Spain) Julián Miralles	Aprilia	19	28	23	16	DNS					25						25	0
	(Czech Republic) Karel Abraham	Aprilia	22	Ret	27	21	27	Ret	Ret	17	17	Ret	28	Ret	28	DNS	18	Ret	0
	(Italy) Gioele Pellino	Malaguti				17	20	28	21	18					23	24	23	22	0
	(Spain) Mateo Túnez	Aprilia	17					19	Ret	24	19		Ret	25	24	23	21	20	0
	(Italy) Federico Sandi	Honda	18	27	25	19	Ret	18	Ret	19	Ret	Ret	23	Ret	26	Ret	Ret	Ret	0
	(France) Matthieu Lussiana	Honda				18													0
	(Switzerland) Vincent Braillard	Aprilia	25	31	DNS	Ret	28	Ret	27	23	22	21	27	Ret				23	0
	(Germany) Patrick Unger	Aprilia									21								0
	(France) Jules Cluzel	Honda				Ret													0
	(France) Jules Cluzel	Malaguti															22	Ret	0
	(United Kingdom) James Westmoreland	Honda								22									0
	(Japan) Hiroaki Kuzuhara	Honda											22						0
	(Germany) Sascha Hommel	Malaguti	24	DNQ	DNS						Ret	23	Ret	30					0
	(Germany) Sascha Hommel	Honda													Ret	Ret	26	26	0
	(China) Cheung Wai On	Honda			24									29					0
	(Spain) Daniel Sáez	Aprilia	Ret					24									Ret	Ret	0
	(Italy) Lorenzo Baroni	Aprilia					24												0
	(Germany) Manuel Mickan	Honda									24								0
	(Germany) Thomas Mayer	Aprilia										24							0
	(Japan) Yuki Hamamoto	Honda											24						0
	(Spain) Esteve Rabat	Honda																24	0
	(Netherlands) Hugo van den Berg	Aprilia						29	31		25								0
	(Japan) Takumi Takahashi	Honda											25						0
	(Spain) David Bonache	Honda										26	Ret	27	Ret	27	Ret	Ret	0
	(Japan) Arata Mori	Honda											26						0
	(Australia) Blake Leigh-Smith	Honda														28			0
	(Italy) Luca Verdini	Aprilia					29												0
	(Netherlands) Gert-Jan Kok	Honda							29										0
	(Japan) Kazuki Hanafusa	Honda											29						0
	(Netherlands) Joey Litjens	Honda							30										0
	(China) Chow Ho-Wan	Honda			31														0
	(Indonesia) Doni Tata Pradita	Yamaha												31					0
	(Czech Republic) Patrik Vostárek	Honda	DNQ	32								Ret							0
	(France) Mathieu Gines	Honda				Ret													0
	(France) Michel Alexis	Honda				Ret													0
	(Italy) Nico Vivarelli	Honda					Ret												0
	(United Kingdom) Kev Coghlan	Honda								Ret									0
	(United Kingdom) Rob Guiver	Honda								Ret									0
	(Czech Republic) Lukáš Razek	Honda										Ret							0
	(Japan) Hiroomi Iwata	Honda											Ret						0
	(Australia) Tom Hatton	Honda														Ret			0
	(France) Yannick Deschamps	Honda				DNS													0
	(Italy) Simone Grotzkyj	Aprilia					DNS												0
	(Portugal) Carlos Ferreira	Honda		DNQ															0
	(China) Zhou You Rao	Honda			DNQ														0
	(Netherlands) Mark van Kreij	Honda							DNQ										0
	(Australia) Brent Rigoli	Honda														DNQ			0
	(Australia) Candice Scott	Honda														DNQ			0
	(Australia) Rhys Moller	Honda														DNQ			0
Pos	Rider	Bike	SPA (Spain)	POR (Portugal)	CHN (China)	FRA (France)	ITA (Italy)	CAT (Catalonia)	NED (Netherlands)	GBR (United Kingdom)	GER (Germany)	CZE (Czech Republic)	JPN (Japan)	MAL (Malaysia)	QAT (Qatar)	AUS (Australia)	TUR (Turkey)	VAL (Valencian Community)	Pts

Colour	Result
Gold	Winner
Silver	Second place
Bronze	Third place
Green	Points classification
Blue	Non-points classification
Blue	Non-classified finish (NC)
Purple	Retired, not classified (Ret)
Red	Did not qualify (DNQ)
Red	Did not pre-qualify (DNPQ)
Black	Disqualified (DSQ)
White	Did not start (DNS)
White	Withdrew (WD)
White	Race cancelled (C)
Blank	Did not practice (DNP)
Blank	Did not arrive (DNA)
Blank	Excluded (EX)

**Bold** – Pole position
Italics – Fastest lap

==== Constructors' standings ====
- Each constructor got the same number of points as their best placed rider in each race.
- Rounds marked with a light blue background were under wet race conditions or stopped by rain.

Pos	Constructor	SPA (Spain)	POR (Portugal)	CHN (China)	FRA (France)	ITA (Italy)	CAT (Catalonia)	NED (Netherlands)	GBR (United Kingdom)	GER (Germany)	CZE (Czech Republic)	JPN (Japan)	MAL (Malaysia)	QAT (Qatar)	AUS (Australia)	TUR (Turkey)	VAL (Valencian Community)	Pts
1	(Austria) KTM	2	1	3	3	1	3	1	1	1	2	1	2	1	5	4	1	332
2	(Japan) Honda	3	3	2	1	2	5	4	2	2	1	2	1	4	1	1	6	304
3	(Italy) Aprilia	1	2	1	2	3	1	2	4	3	3	3	3	3	3	2	3	296
4	(Italy) Gilera	6	5	12	10	6	6	8	25	11	8	6	8	7	13	11	Ret	107
5	(Spain) Derbi	12	12	8	7	21	Ret	11	5	6	16	8	12	15	18	13	10	73
6	(Italy) Malaguti	24	19	13	17	19	28	21	18	Ret	23	Ret	30	23	24	22	22	3
	(Japan) Yamaha												31					0
Pos	Constructor	SPA (Spain)	POR (Portugal)	CHN (China)	FRA (France)	ITA (Italy)	CAT (Catalonia)	NED (Netherlands)	GBR (United Kingdom)	GER (Germany)	CZE (Czech Republic)	JPN (Japan)	MAL (Malaysia)	QAT (Qatar)	AUS (Australia)	TUR (Turkey)	VAL (Valencian Community)	Pts

== Sources ==
- "The Official MotoGP website". Archived from the original on 2013-07-28.
