= Wang Zhu (motorcyclist) =

Chinese motorcycle racer

- Nationality: Chinese
- Born: Xi'an, China

Wang Zhu (born 1987 or 1988) is a Chinese Grand Prix motorcycle racer.

== Career statistics ==
=== By season ===
| Season | Class | Motorcycle | Number | Race | Win | Podium | Pole | FLap | Pts | Plcd |
|---|---|---|---|---|---|---|---|---|---|---|
| 2005 | 250cc | Aprilia | 60 | 2 | 0 | 0 | 0 | 0 | 0 | NC |
| 2006 | 250cc | Aprilia | 60 | 1 | 0 | 0 | 0 | 0 | 0 | NC |
| Total | | | | 3 | 0 | 0 | 0 | 0 | 0 | |
