= 2005 Turkish motorcycle Grand Prix =

2005 Turkey Grand Prix
Race details
- Race 16 of 17 races in the 2005 Grand Prix motorcycle racing season
- Date: 23 October 2005
- Official name: Grand Prix of Turkey
- Location: Istanbul Park
- Course: Permanent racing facility; 5.338 km (3.317 mi)

MotoGP
Pole position
- Rider: (Spain) Sete Gibernau
- Time: 1:52.334
Fastest lap
- Rider: (Italy) Marco Melandri
- Time: 1:53.111 on lap 17
Podium
- First: (Italy) Marco Melandri
- Second: (Italy) Valentino Rossi
- Third: (United States) Nicky Hayden

250cc
Pole position
- Rider: (San Marino) Alex de Angelis
- Time: 1:56.930
Fastest lap
- Rider: (Spain) Daniel Pedrosa
- Time: 1:57.595 on lap 13
Podium
- First: (Australia) Casey Stoner
- Second: (Spain) Daniel Pedrosa
- Third: (Japan) Hiroshi Aoyama

125cc
Pole position
- Rider: (Switzerland) Thomas Lüthi
- Time: 2:03.585
Fastest lap
- Rider: (Switzerland) Thomas Lüthi
- Time: 2:04.428 on lap 5
Podium
- First: (France) Mike Di Meglio
- Second: (Italy) Mattia Pasini
- Third: (Japan) Tomoyoshi Koyama

The 2005 Turkish motorcycle Grand Prix was the penultimate round of the 2005 MotoGP Championship. It took place on the weekend of 21–23 October 2005 at the Istanbul Park circuit.

== MotoGP classification ==
Pos.	No.	Rider	Team	Manufacturer	Laps	Time/Retired	Grid	Points
1	33	(Italy) Marco Melandri	Movistar Honda MotoGP	Honda	22	41:44.139	2	25
2	46	(Italy) Valentino Rossi	Gauloises Yamaha Team	Yamaha	22	+1.513	4	20
3	69	(United States) Nicky Hayden	Repsol Honda Team	Honda	22	+6.873	3	16
4	15	(Spain) Sete Gibernau	Movistar Honda MotoGP	Honda	22	+12.420	1	13
5	7	(Spain) Carlos Checa	Ducati Marlboro Team	Ducati	22	+26.963	9	11
6	24	(Spain) Toni Elías	Fortuna Yamaha Team	Yamaha	22	+29.105	6	10
7	5	(United States) Colin Edwards	Gauloises Yamaha Team	Yamaha	22	+29.255	5	9
8	6	(Japan) Makoto Tamada	Konica Minolta Honda	Honda	22	+33.345	7	8
9	4	(Brazil) Alex Barros	Camel Honda	Honda	22	+33.790	8	7
10	56	(Japan) Shinya Nakano	Kawasaki Racing Team	Kawasaki	22	+44.225	10	6
11	17	(Australia) Chris Vermeulen	Camel Honda	Honda	22	+46.099	11	5
12	3	(Italy) Max Biaggi	Repsol Honda Team	Honda	22	+50.184	12	4
13	19	(France) Olivier Jacque	Kawasaki Racing Team	Kawasaki	22	+56.766	13	3
14	11	(Spain) Rubén Xaus	Fortuna Yamaha Team	Yamaha	22	+1:01.360	16	2
15	21	(United States) John Hopkins	Team Suzuki MotoGP	Suzuki	22	+1:03.391	14	1
16	44	(Italy) Roberto Rolfo	Team d'Antin Pramac	Ducati	22	+1:17.654	17	
17	27	(Italy) Franco Battaini	Blata WCM	Blata	21	+1 lap	19	
18	77	(United Kingdom) James Ellison	Blata WCM	Blata	21	+1 lap	18	
DSQ	23	(Japan) Shinichi Ito	Ducati Marlboro Team	Ducati	6	Black flag	15	

== 250cc classification ==
Pos.	No.	Rider	Manufacturer	Laps	Time/Retired	Grid	Points
1	27	(Australia) Casey Stoner	Aprilia	20	39:28.243	2	25
2	1	(Spain) Daniel Pedrosa	Honda	20	+0.093	4	20
3	73	(Japan) Hiroshi Aoyama	Honda	20	+11.647	3	16
4	48	(Spain) Jorge Lorenzo	Honda	20	+21.861	7	13
5	34	(Italy) Andrea Dovizioso	Honda	20	+21.940	8	11
6	80	(Spain) Héctor Barberá	Honda	20	+22.258	6	10
7	5	(San Marino) Alex de Angelis	Aprilia	20	+43.755	1	9
8	15	(Italy) Roberto Locatelli	Aprilia	20	+44.105	9	8
9	50	(France) Sylvain Guintoli	Aprilia	20	+48.918	13	7
10	57	(United Kingdom) Chaz Davies	Aprilia	20	+54.376	17	6
11	25	(Italy) Alex Baldolini	Aprilia	20	+54.651	16	5
12	6	(Spain) Alex Debón	Honda	20	+59.791	12	4
13	8	(Italy) Andrea Ballerini	Aprilia	20	+1:00.082	22	3
14	32	(Italy) Mirko Giansanti	Aprilia	20	+1:00.225	23	2
15	96	(Czech Republic) Jakub Smrž	Honda	20	+1:00.338	19	1
16	28	(Germany) Dirk Heidolf	Honda	20	+1:28.084	21	
17	56	(France) Mathieu Gines	Aprilia	20	+1:34.665	25	
18	33	(Spain) Arturo Tizón	Honda	20	+1:45.487	24	
19	63	(France) Erwan Nigon	Yamaha	19	+1 lap	26	
20	61	(China) Li Zheng Peng	Aprilia	19	+1 lap	28	
21	23	(Sweden) Nicklas Cajback	Yamaha	19	+1 lap	30	
Ret	55	(Japan) Yuki Takahashi	Honda	19	Accident	11	
Ret	21	(France) Arnaud Vincent	Fantic	11	Retirement	27	
Ret	60	(China) Wang Zhu	Aprilia	11	Accident	29	
Ret	24	(Italy) Simone Corsi	Aprilia	9	Accident	15	
Ret	36	(Colombia) Martín Cárdenas	Aprilia	4	Accident	18	
Ret	44	(Japan) Taro Sekiguchi	Aprilia	2	Accident	20	
Ret	17	(Germany) Steve Jenkner	Aprilia	2	Retirement	14	
Ret	19	(Argentina) Sebastián Porto	Aprilia	1	Accident	5	
Ret	7	(France) Randy de Puniet	Aprilia	0	Accident	10	
DNQ	20	(Italy) Gabriele Ferro	Fantic		Did not qualify		

== 125cc classification ==
Pos.	No.	Rider	Manufacturer	Laps	Time/Retired	Grid	Points
1	63	(France) Mike Di Meglio	Honda	19	39:50.377	6	25
2	75	(Italy) Mattia Pasini	Aprilia	19	+0.105	4	20
3	71	(Japan) Tomoyoshi Koyama	Honda	19	+0.156	7	16
4	14	(Hungary) Gábor Talmácsi	KTM	19	+0.271	8	13
5	12	(Switzerland) Thomas Lüthi	Honda	19	+0.417	1	11
6	58	(Italy) Marco Simoncelli	Aprilia	19	+5.752	9	10
7	32	(Italy) Fabrizio Lai	Honda	19	+6.148	11	9
8	47	(Spain) Ángel Rodríguez	Aprilia	19	+6.294	15	8
9	6	(Spain) Joan Olivé	Aprilia	19	+6.611	14	7
10	29	(Italy) Andrea Iannone	Aprilia	19	+17.119	21	6
11	54	(San Marino) Manuel Poggiali	Gilera	19	+17.554	17	5
12	19	(Spain) Álvaro Bautista	Honda	19	+21.232	16	4
13	52	(Czech Republic) Lukáš Pešek	Derbi	19	+21.466	10	3
14	11	(Germany) Sandro Cortese	Honda	19	+42.207	25	2
15	25	(Germany) Dario Giuseppetti	Aprilia	19	+42.798	26	1
16	18	(Spain) Nicolás Terol	Derbi	19	+47.875	19	
17	41	(Spain) Aleix Espargaró	Honda	19	+47.915	23	
18	44	(Czech Republic) Karel Abraham	Aprilia	19	+48.240	22	
19	28	(Spain) Jordi Carchano	Aprilia	19	+48.367	24	
20	22	(Spain) Pablo Nieto	Derbi	19	+48.693	20	
21	46	(Spain) Mateo Túnez	Aprilia	19	+48.940	32	
22	89	(France) Jules Cluzel	Malaguti	19	+1:07.174	28	
23	42	(Italy) Gioele Pellino	Malaguti	19	+1:07.453	33	
24	45	(Hungary) Imre Tóth	Aprilia	19	+1:12.930	27	
25	43	(Spain) Manuel Hernández	Honda	19	+1:13.742	30	
26	31	(Germany) Sascha Hommel	Honda	19	+1:36.276	35	
Ret	36	(Finland) Mika Kallio	KTM	18	Accident	3	
Ret	7	(France) Alexis Masbou	Honda	14	Accident	13	
Ret	10	(Italy) Federico Sandi	Honda	12	Retirement	29	
Ret	8	(Italy) Lorenzo Zanetti	Aprilia	8	Retirement	18	
Ret	48	(Spain) David Bonache	Honda	5	Accident	34	
Ret	55	(Spain) Héctor Faubel	Aprilia	3	Accident	2	
Ret	33	(Spain) Sergio Gadea	Aprilia	3	Accident	5	
Ret	49	(Spain) Daniel Sáez	Aprilia	1	Retirement	31	
Ret	35	(Italy) Raffaele De Rosa	Aprilia	0	Accident	12	

== Championship standings after the race (MotoGP) ==
Below are the standings for the top five riders and constructors after round sixteen has concluded.

Riders' Championship standings

Pos.	Rider	Points
1	(Italy) Valentino Rossi	351
2	(Italy) Marco Melandri	195
3	(United States) Nicky Hayden	186
4	(United States) Colin Edwards	171
5	(Italy) Max Biaggi	163

Constructors' Championship standings

Pos.	Constructor	Points
1	(Japan) Yamaha	365
2	(Japan) Honda	316
3	(Italy) Ducati	189
4	(Japan) Kawasaki	121
5	(Japan) Suzuki	97

- Note: Only the top five positions are included for both sets of standings.

Previous race: 2005 Australian Grand Prix	FIM Grand Prix World Championship; 2005 season	Next race: 2005 Valencian Grand Prix
Previous race: None	Turkish motorcycle Grand Prix	Next race: 2006 Turkish Grand Prix
