= 2005 Spanish motorcycle Grand Prix =

(Spain) 2005 Spanish Grand Prix
Race details
- Race 1 of 17 races in the 2005 Grand Prix motorcycle racing season
- Date: 10 April 2005
- Official name: Gran Premio Marlboro de España
- Location: Circuito de Jerez
- Course: Permanent racing facility; 4.423 km (2.748 mi)

MotoGP
Pole position
- Rider: (Italy) Valentino Rossi
- Time: 1:39.419
Fastest lap
- Rider: (Italy) Valentino Rossi
- Time: 1:40.596 on lap 5
Podium
- First: (Italy) Valentino Rossi
- Second: (Spain) Sete Gibernau
- Third: (Italy) Marco Melandri

250cc
Pole position
- Rider: (Spain) Daniel Pedrosa
- Time: 1:42.868
Fastest lap
- Rider: (France) Randy de Puniet
- Time: 1:44.459 on lap 5
Podium
- First: (Spain) Daniel Pedrosa
- Second: (Argentina) Sebastián Porto
- Third: (San Marino) Alex de Angelis

125cc
Pole position
- Rider: (Italy) Marco Simoncelli
- Time: 1:46.996
Fastest lap
- Rider: (Spain) Pablo Nieto
- Time: 1:49.176 on lap 7
Podium
- First: (Italy) Marco Simoncelli
- Second: (Finland) Mika Kallio
- Third: (Italy) Fabrizio Lai

The 2005 Spanish motorcycle Grand Prix was the first round of the 2005 MotoGP Championship. It took place on the weekend of 8–10 April 2005 at Jerez.

== MotoGP classification ==
Pos.	No.	Rider	Team	Manufacturer	Laps	Time/Retired	Grid	Points
1	46	(Italy) Valentino Rossi	Gauloises Yamaha Team	Yamaha	27	45:43.156	1	25
2	15	(Spain) Sete Gibernau	Movistar Honda MotoGP	Honda	27	+8.631	2	20
3	33	(Italy) Marco Melandri	Movistar Honda MotoGP	Honda	27	+18.460	3	16
4	4	(Brazil) Alex Barros	Camel Honda	Honda	27	+26.938	8	13
5	56	(Japan) Shinya Nakano	Kawasaki Racing Team	Kawasaki	27	+27.659	5	11
6	12	(Australia) Troy Bayliss	Camel Honda	Honda	27	+28.509	9	10
7	3	(Italy) Max Biaggi	Repsol Honda Team	Honda	27	+30.618	16	9
8	6	(Japan) Makoto Tamada	JIR Konica Minolta Honda	Honda	27	+36.887	7	8
9	5	(United States) Colin Edwards	Gauloises Yamaha Team	Yamaha	27	+37.608	15	7
10	7	(Spain) Carlos Checa	Ducati Marlboro Team	Ducati	27	+39.678	12	6
11	66	(Germany) Alex Hofmann	Kawasaki Racing Team	Kawasaki	27	+42.283	10	5
12	24	(Spain) Toni Elías	Fortuna Yamaha Team	Yamaha	27	+55.457	13	4
13	65	(Italy) Loris Capirossi	Ducati Marlboro Team	Ducati	27	+1:02.372	6	3
14	21	(United States) John Hopkins	Team Suzuki MotoGP	Suzuki	27	+1:19.346	11	2
15	44	(Italy) Roberto Rolfo	D'Antin MotoGP – Pramac	Ducati	27	+1:33.607	18	1
16	77	(United Kingdom) James Ellison	Blata WCM	Blata	26	+1 lap	21	
17	27	(Italy) Franco Battaini	Blata WCM	Blata	26	+1 lap	19	
18	11	(Spain) Rubén Xaus	Fortuna Yamaha Team	Yamaha	24	+3 laps	17	
Ret	69	(United States) Nicky Hayden	Repsol Honda Team	Honda	20	Retirement	4	
Ret	10	(United States) Kenny Roberts Jr.	Team Suzuki MotoGP	Suzuki	11	Retirement	14	
Ret	67	(United Kingdom) Shane Byrne	Team Roberts	Proton KR	2	Retirement	20	

== 250 cc classification ==
Pos.	No.	Rider	Manufacturer	Laps	Time/Retired	Grid	Points
1	1	(Spain) Daniel Pedrosa	Honda	26	45:36.679	1	25
2	19	(Argentina) Sebastián Porto	Aprilia	26	+2.136	2	20
3	5	(San Marino) Alex de Angelis	Aprilia	26	+29.682	5	16
4	34	(Italy) Andrea Dovizioso	Honda	26	+36.539	10	13
5	80	(Spain) Héctor Barberá	Honda	26	+37.499	7	11
6	48	(Spain) Jorge Lorenzo	Honda	26	+37.728	9	10
7	15	(Italy) Roberto Locatelli	Aprilia	26	+45.038	8	9
8	6	(Spain) Alex Debón	Honda	26	+56.339	14	8
9	24	(Italy) Simone Corsi	Aprilia	26	+1:02.844	12	7
10	32	(Italy) Mirko Giansanti	Aprilia	26	+1:10.708	21	6
11	57	(United Kingdom) Chaz Davies	Aprilia	26	+1:20.790	19	5
12	64	(Czech Republic) Radomil Rous	Honda	26	+1:20.950	20	4
13	25	(Italy) Alex Baldolini	Aprilia	25	+1 lap	18	3
14	8	(Italy) Andrea Ballerini	Aprilia	25	+1 lap	23	2
15	38	(France) Grégory Leblanc	Aprilia	25	+1 lap	25	1
16	12	(Hungary) Gábor Rizmayer	Yamaha	25	+1 lap	27	
Ret	96	(Czech Republic) Jakub Smrž	Honda	25	Retirement	15	
Ret	41	(Spain) Álvaro Molina	Aprilia	25	Retirement	17	
Ret	9	(France) Hugo Marchand	Aprilia	19	Retirement	26	
Ret	17	(Germany) Steve Jenkner	Aprilia	14	Accident	13	
Ret	27	(Australia) Casey Stoner	Aprilia	13	Accident	3	
Ret	7	(France) Randy de Puniet	Aprilia	11	Accident	4	
Ret	55	(Japan) Yuki Takahashi	Honda	10	Retirement	11	
Ret	73	(Japan) Hiroshi Aoyama	Honda	8	Accident	6	
Ret	21	(France) Arnaud Vincent	Fantic	8	Retirement	28	
Ret	28	(Germany) Dirk Heidolf	Honda	5	Retirement	22	
Ret	50	(France) Sylvain Guintoli	Aprilia	2	Retirement	16	
Ret	36	(Colombia) Martín Cárdenas	Aprilia	1	Accident	24	
DNQ	42	(Austria) Yves Polzer	Aprilia		Did not qualify		
DNQ	16	(Germany) Franz Aschenbrenner	Yamaha		Did not qualify		
DNQ	20	(Italy) Gabriele Ferro	Fantic		Did not qualify		

== 125 cc classification ==
Pos.	No.	Rider	Manufacturer	Laps	Time/Retired	Grid	Points
1	58	(Italy) Marco Simoncelli	Aprilia	23	42:27.960	1	25
2	36	(Finland) Mika Kallio	KTM	23	+1.418	5	20
3	32	(Italy) Fabrizio Lai	Honda	23	+1.510	4	16
4	75	(Italy) Mattia Pasini	Aprilia	23	+8.282	2	13
5	14	(Hungary) Gábor Talmácsi	KTM	23	+8.930	6	11
6	54	(San Marino) Manuel Poggiali	Gilera	23	+13.651	11	10
7	55	(Spain) Héctor Faubel	Aprilia	23	+14.590	7	9
8	6	(Spain) Joan Olivé	Aprilia	23	+17.164	24	8
9	60	(Spain) Julián Simón	KTM	23	+17.262	14	7
10	43	(Spain) Manuel Hernández	Aprilia	23	+31.147	15	6
11	63	(France) Mike Di Meglio	Honda	23	+34.737	16	5
12	22	(Spain) Pablo Nieto	Derbi	23	+34.801	13	4
13	28	(Spain) Jordi Carchano	Aprilia	23	+37.146	17	3
14	41	(Spain) Aleix Espargaró	Honda	23	+49.591	22	2
15	18	(Spain) Nicolás Terol	Derbi	23	+51.629	26	1
16	45	(Hungary) Imre Tóth	Aprilia	23	+54.608	19	
17	86	(Spain) Mateo Túnez	Aprilia	23	+54.747	32	
18	10	(Italy) Federico Sandi	Honda	23	+54.960	25	
19	84	(Spain) Julián Miralles	Aprilia	23	+55.527	30	
20	11	(Germany) Sandro Cortese	Honda	23	+1:10.864	21	
21	29	(Italy) Andrea Iannone	Aprilia	23	+1:22.697	29	
22	44	(Czech Republic) Karel Abraham	Aprilia	23	+1:26.526	36	
23	16	(Netherlands) Raymond Schouten	Honda	23	+1:38.103	35	
24	31	(Germany) Sascha Hommel	Malaguti	23	+1:47.461	37	
25	26	(Switzerland) Vincent Braillard	Aprilia	22	+1 lap	27	
Ret	71	(Japan) Tomoyoshi Koyama	Honda	21	Retirement	10	
Ret	7	(France) Alexis Masbou	Honda	20	Retirement	28	
Ret	49	(Spain) Daniel Sáez	Aprilia	19	Retirement	38	
Ret	25	(Germany) Dario Giuseppetti	Aprilia	16	Accident	31	
Ret	12	(Switzerland) Thomas Lüthi	Honda	15	Retirement	3	
Ret	9	(Japan) Toshihisa Kuzuhara	Honda	15	Retirement	23	
Ret	33	(Spain) Sergio Gadea	Aprilia	10	Accident	18	
Ret	52	(Czech Republic) Lukáš Pešek	Derbi	9	Retirement	12	
Ret	47	(Spain) Ángel Rodríguez	Honda	6	Retirement	33	
Ret	35	(Italy) Raffaele De Rosa	Aprilia	3	Accident	8	
Ret	15	(Italy) Michele Pirro	Malaguti	0	Accident	34	
Ret	19	(Spain) Álvaro Bautista	Honda	0	Retirement	20	
Ret	48	(Spain) David Bonache	Honda	0	Retirement	39	
Ret	8	(Italy) Lorenzo Zanetti	Aprilia	0	Did not start	9	
DNQ	87	(Czech Republic) Patrik Vostárek	Honda		Did not qualify		

== Championship standings after the race (MotoGP) ==
Below are the standings for the top five riders and constructors after round one has concluded.

Riders' Championship standings

Pos.	Rider	Points
1	(Italy) Valentino Rossi	25
2	(Spain) Sete Gibernau	20
3	(Italy) Marco Melandri	16
4	(Brazil) Alex Barros	13
5	(Japan) Shinya Nakano	11

Constructors' Championship standings

Pos.	Constructor	Points
1	(Japan) Yamaha	25
2	(Japan) Honda	20
3	(Japan) Kawasaki	11
4	(Italy) Ducati	6
5	(Japan) Suzuki	2

- Note: Only the top five positions are included for both sets of standings.

Previous race: 2004 Valencian Grand Prix	FIM Grand Prix World Championship; 2005 season	Next race: 2005 Portuguese Grand Prix
Previous race: 2004 Spanish Grand Prix	Spanish motorcycle Grand Prix	Next race: 2006 Spanish Grand Prix
