= List of Grand Prix motorcycle racers: O =

The following are riders who have taken part in Grand Prix motorcycle racing and whose surnames begin with "O".

Name	Seasons	World Championships	MotoGP Wins	500cc Wins	350cc Wins	Moto2 Wins	250cc Wins	Moto3 Wins	125cc Wins	80cc Wins	50cc Wins	MotoE Wins
(Republic of Ireland) Casey O'Gorman	2025-	0	0	0	0	0	0	0	0	0	0	0
(United Kingdom) Eddie O'Shea	2024-	0	0	0	0	0	0	0	0	0	0	0
(Italy) Tomasso Occhi	2025	0	0	0	0	0	0	0	0	0	0	0
(South Africa) Steven Odendaal	2011-2013, 2015-2019	0	0	0	0	0	0	0	0	0	0	0
(United Kingdom) Scott Ogden	2022-	0	0	0	0	0	0	0	0	0	0	0
(Japan) Ai Ogura	2018-	1 Moto2 - 2024	1	0	0	6	0	0	0	0	0	0
(Australia) Jason O'Halloran	2013	0	0	0	0	0	0	0	0	0	0	0
(Japan) Jun Ohnishi	2011	0	0	0	0	0	0	0	0	0	0	0
(Japan) Seijin Oikawa	2006-2007	0	0	0	0	0	0	0	0	0	0	0
(Japan) Tadayuki Okada	1989-2000, 2008	0	0	4	0	0	2	0	0	0	0	0
(Japan) Shizuka Okazaki	2016, 2018	0	0	0	0	0	0	0	0	0	0	0
(Japan) Hikari Okubo	2010-2011, 2014, 2021-2023	0	0	0	0	0	0	0	0	0	0	0
(Spain) Joan Olivé	2001-2012	0	0	0	0	0	0	0	0	0	0	0
(Portugal) Miguel Oliveira	2011-2025	0	5	0	0	6	0	6	0	0	0	0
(Turkey) Can Öncü	2018-2019	0	0	0	0	0	0	1	0	0	0	0
(Turkey) Deniz Öncü	2019-	0	0	0	0	2	0	3	0	0	0	0
(France) Ornella Ongaro	2009	0	0	0	0	0	0	0	0	0	0	0
(Japan) Hiroki Ono	2008, 2011, 2013-2016	0	0	0	0	0	0	0	0	0	0	0
(Japan) Yuki Oogane	2009	0	0	0	0	0	0	0	0	0	0	0
(Belgium) Jean-Philippe Orban	1977-1978	0	0	0	0	0	0	0	0	0	0	0
(Spain) Iván Ortolá	2022-	0	0	0	0	2	0	4	0	0	0	0
(Japan) Kazuya Otani	2006	0	0	0	0	0	0	0	0	0	0	0
(Germany) Peter Öttl	1986-1997	0	0	0	0	0	0	0	2	3	0	0
(Germany) Philipp Öttl	2012-2019	0	0	0	0	0	0	1	0	0	0	0
