= Randy Gevers =

Dutch motorcycle racer

- Nationality: Dutch
- Born: 3 January 1981 (age 45); Den Bosch, Netherlands
Motorcycle racing career statistics
250cc World Championship
Active years	2003–2007
Manufacturers	Honda, Aprilia
Starts / Wins / Podiums / Poles / F. laps / Points; 2 / 0 / 0 / 0 / 0 / 0
125cc World Championship
Active years	2002
Manufacturers	Honda
Starts / Wins / Podiums / Poles / F. laps / Points; 1 / 0 / 0 / 0 / 0 / 0

Randy Gevers (born 3 January 1981) is a Dutch motorcycle racer. He won the Dutch 250cc Championship in 2007.

== Career statistics ==
=== Grand Prix motorcycle racing ===
==== By season ====
Season	Class	Motorcycle	Team	Number	Race	Win	Podium	Pole	FLap	Pts	Plcd
2002	125cc	Honda	MG Parts - RG Racing Team	60	1	0	0	0	0	0	NC
2003	250cc	Honda	De Arend Horeca Meubilair	49	0	0	0	0	0	0	NC
2004	250cc	Aprilia	De Arend Filart Racing	61	0	0	0	0	0	0	NC
2005	250cc	Aprilia	De Arend Filart Racing	67	0	0	0	0	0	0	NC
2006	250cc	Aprilia	DE Arend - Filart Racing	68	1	0	0	0	0	0	NC
2007	250cc	Aprilia	De Arend Racing	68	1	0	0	0	0	0	NC
Total					3	0	0	0	0	0	

==== Races by year ====
(key)

Year	Class	Bike	1	2	3	4	5	6	7	8	9	10	11	12	13	14	15	16	17	Pos.	Pts
2002	125cc	Honda	JPN	RSA	SPA	FRA	ITA	CAT	NED; 31	GBR	GER	CZE	POR	BRA	PAC	MAL	AUS	VAL		NC	0
2003	250cc	Honda	JPN	RSA	SPA	FRA	ITA	CAT	NED; DNQ	GBR	GER	CZE	POR	BRA	PAC	MAL	AUS	VAL		NC	0
2004	250cc	Aprilia	RSA	SPA	FRA	ITA	CAT	NED; DNQ	BRA	GER	GBR	CZE	POR	JPN	QAT	MAL	AUS	VAL		NC	0
2005	250cc	Aprilia	SPA	POR	CHN	FRA	ITA	CAT	NED; DNS	GBR	GER	CZE	JPN	MAL	QAT	AUS	TUR	VAL		NC	0
2006	250cc	Aprilia	SPA	QAT	TUR	CHN	FRA	ITA	CAT	NED; 21	GBR	GER	CZE	MAL	AUS	JPN	POR	VAL		NC	0
2007	250cc	Aprilia	QAT	SPA	TUR	CHN	FRA	ITA	CAT	GBR	NED; 24	GER	CZE	RSM	POR	JPN	AUS	MAL	VAL	NC	0
