= Hiroaki Kuzuhara =

Japanese motorcycle racer

- Nationality: Japanese
- Born: 14 June 1983 (age 43); Tokushima, Japan
Motorcycle racing career statistics
125cc World Championship
| Active years | 2003, 2005–2006 |
| Manufacturers | Honda, Malaguti, Aprilia |
Starts / Wins / Podiums / Poles / F. laps / Points; 9 / 0 / 0 / 0 / 0 / 1

Hiroaki Kuzuhara (葛原 大陽, Kuzuhara Hiroaki; born 14 June 1983) is a Japanese motorcycle racer and boat racer.

== Career statistics ==
=== Grand Prix motorcycle racing ===
==== By season ====
| Season | Class | Motorcycle | Team | Race | Win | Podium | Pole | FLap | Pts | Plcd |
|---|---|---|---|---|---|---|---|---|---|---|
| 2003 | 125cc | Honda | Honda Hamamatsu Escargot | 1 | 0 | 0 | 0 | 0 | 0 | NC |
| 2005 | 125cc | Honda | Jha Racing | 1 | 0 | 0 | 0 | 0 | 0 | NC |
| 2006 | 125cc | Honda | Grillini Racing | 1 | 0 | 0 | 0 | 0 | 1 | 29th |
| 2006 | 125cc | Malaguti | Malaguti Ajo Corse | 2 | 0 | 0 | 0 | 0 | 1 | 29th |
| 2006 | 125cc | Aprilia | WTR Blauer USA | 4 | 0 | 0 | 0 | 0 | 1 | 29th |
| Total | | | | 9 | 0 | 0 | 0 | 0 | 1 | |

==== Races by year ====
(key)

| Year | Class | Bike | 1 | 2 | 3 | 4 | 5 | 6 | 7 | 8 | 9 | 10 | 11 | 12 | 13 | 14 | 15 | 16 | Pos. | Pts |
|---|---|---|---|---|---|---|---|---|---|---|---|---|---|---|---|---|---|---|---|---|
| 2003 | 125cc | Honda | JPN | RSA | SPA | FRA | ITA | CAT | NED | GBR | GER | CZE | POR | BRA | PAC; 23 | MAL | AUS | VAL | NC | 0 |
| 2005 | 125cc | Honda | SPA | POR | CHN | FRA | ITA | CAT | NED | GBR | GER | CZE | JPN; 22 | MAL | QAT | AUS | TUR | VAL | NC | 0 |
| 2006 | 125cc | Honda | SPA | QAT | TUR | CHN | FRA | ITA; 20 | CAT | | | | | | | | | | 29th | 1 |
| 2006 | 125cc | Malaguti | | | | | | | | NED; 28 | GBR; 26 | GER | CZE | MAL | | | | | 29th | 1 |
| 2006 | 125cc | Aprilia | | | | | | | | | | | | | AUS; 25 | JPN; 15 | POR; Ret | VAL; 27 | 29th | 1 |
