= Michele Danese =

Italian motorcycle racer (born 1982)

- Nationality: Italian
- Born: 11 September 1982 (age 44); Montecchio Maggiore, Italy
Motorcycle racing career statistics
250cc World Championship
Active years	2005–2006
Manufacturers	Aprilia
Starts / Wins / Podiums / Poles / F. laps / Points; 4 / 0 / 0 / 0 / 0 / 0
125cc World Championship
Active years	2003–2004
Manufacturers	Honda, Aprilia
Starts / Wins / Podiums / Poles / F. laps / Points; 6 / 0 / 0 / 0 / 0 / 0

Michele Danese (born 11 September 1982) is an Italian motorcycle racer.

== Career statistics ==
=== CIV 125cc Championship ===
==== Races by year ====
(key) (Races in bold indicate pole position; races in italics indicate fastest lap)

Year	Bike	1	2	3	4	5	Pos	Pts
2001	Aprilia	MIS1	MON; 13	VAL; 13	MIS2; 15	MIS3; 14	19th	9

=== CIV Championship (Campionato Italiano Velocita) ===
==== Races by year ====
(key) (Races in bold indicate pole position; races in italics indicate fastest lap)

Year	Class	Bike	1	2	3	4	5	6	Pos	Pts
2003	125cc	Aprilia	MIS1; 8	MUG1; Ret	MIS1; 5	MUG2; 6	VAL; Ret		8th	29
2004	125cc	Aprilia	MUG; 4	IMO; 3	VAL1; 8	MIS; 2	VAL2; 3		3rd	73
2005	125cc	Aprilia	VAL	MON	IMO	MIS1; Ret	MUG; 3	MIS2; Ret	19th	16

=== Grand Prix motorcycle racing ===
==== By season ====
Season	Class	Motorcycle	Team	Race	Win	Podium	Pole	FLap	Pts	Plcd
2003	125cc	Honda	Metasystem Racing Service	5	0	0	0	0	0	NC
2004	125cc	Aprilia	Abruzzo Racing Team	1	0	0	0	0	0	NC
2005	250cc	Aprilia	Campetella Racing	1	0	0	0	0	0	NC
2006	250cc	Aprilia	WTR Blauer USA	3	0	0	0	0	0	NC
Total				**10**	**0**	**0**	**0**	**0**	**0**	

==== Races by year ====
(key) (Races in bold indicate pole position)

Year	Class	Bike	1	2	3	4	5	6	7	8	9	10	11	12	13	14	15	16	Pos.	Pts
2003	125cc	Honda	JPN	RSA	SPA	FRA	ITA	CAT	NED	GBR	GER	CZE	POR	BRA; 27	PAC; Ret	MAL; 26	AUS; 17	VAL; Ret	NC	0
2004	125cc	Aprilia	RSA	SPA	FRA	ITA; Ret	CAT	NED	BRA	GER	GBR	CZE	POR	JPN	QAT	MAL	AUS	VAL	NC	0
2005	250cc	Aprilia	SPA	POR	CHN	FRA	ITA	CAT	NED; 22	GBR	GER	CZE	JPN	MAL	QAT	AUS	TUR	VAL	NC	0
2006	250cc	Aprilia	SPA; 16	QAT; 19	TUR; Ret	CHN	FRA	ITA	CAT	NED	GBR	GER	CZE	MAL	AUS	JPN	POR	VAL	NC	0
