= 2006 Grand Prix motorcycle racing season =

Sports season

2006 F.I.M. Grand Prix motorcycle racing season

Seasons
- ← 2005 2007 →

2006 World Champions

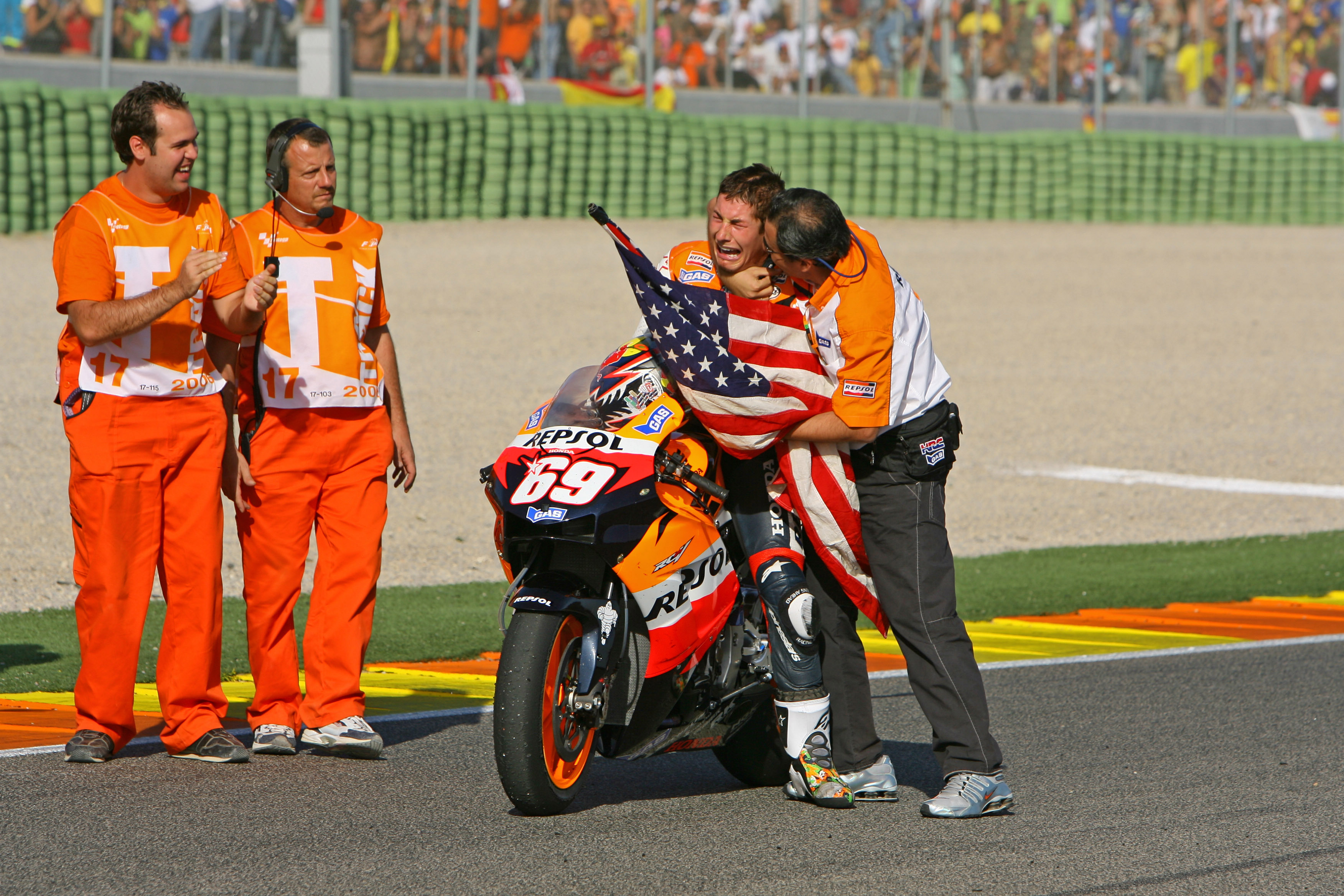
Nicky Hayden celebrating his world championship title at the 2006 Valencian Community Grand Prix

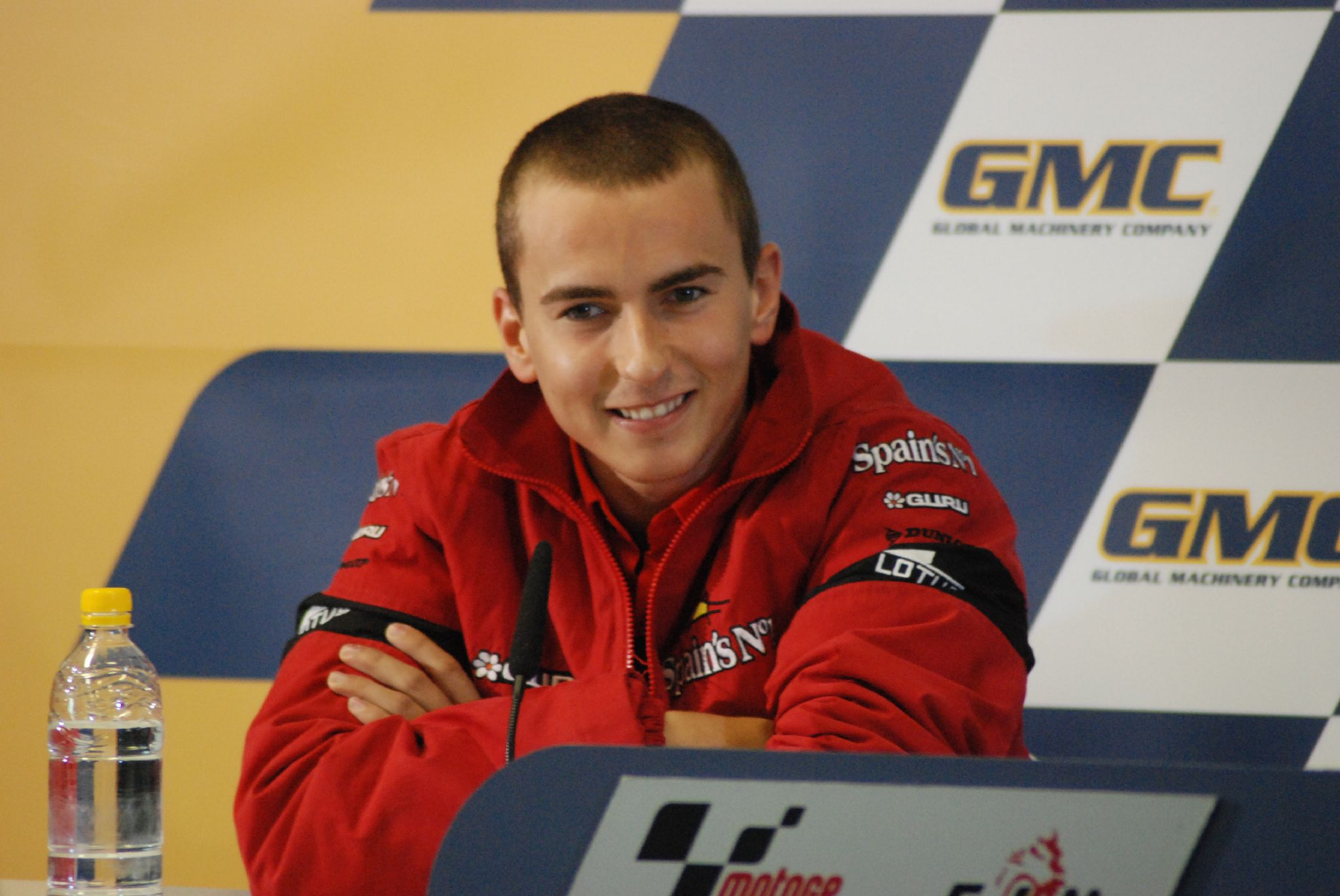
Jorge Lorenzo (pictured in 2007) became the 250cc World Champion

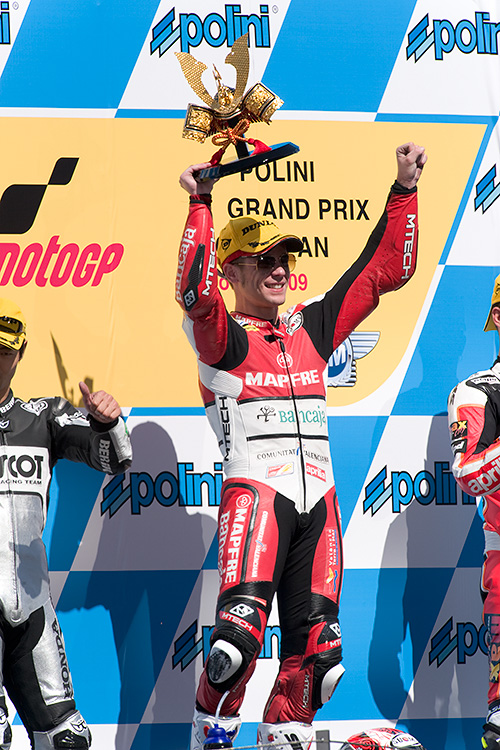
Álvaro Bautista (pictured in 2009) became the 125cc World Champion

The 2006 Grand Prix motorcycle racing season was the 58th Fédération Internationale de Motocyclisme (FIM) Road racing World Championship season. The season consisted out of 17 races for the MotoGP class and 16 for the 125cc and 250cc classes, beginning with the Spanish motorcycle Grand Prix on 26 March 2006 and ending with the Valencian Community motorcycle Grand Prix on 29 October.

== Season summary ==
The 2006 MotoGP season was one of the closest battles in recent years, in which Honda's Nicky Hayden did not claim the championship from Valentino Rossi until the final race of the year. The victory was Hayden's first and only World Championship. Seven different riders claimed Grand Prix victories including first time winners Dani Pedrosa, Toni Elías and Troy Bayliss. Yamaha's Valentino Rossi fought back from a 51-point deficit to lead the championship going into the final rounds. Hayden's fortunes took a dip when he was taken out by his teammate Pedrosa at the penultimate round in Portugal, but he bounced back to win the crown when Rossi crashed in the final race at Valencia. Hayden only won two races to Rossi's five, but the Yamaha suffered a number of mechanical issues that led to more retirements, which allowed Hayden to score more podiums. In addition, the surprise win of Elias in Portugal, with a margin of just 0.002 second over Rossi, proved to be a major decider in the championship. Rossi had given up five points in that round, the same amount by which he was behind Hayden in the final standings. Had there been a tie, Rossi would have been crowned World Champion due to more race victories than Hayden.

In the 250cc class, Aprilia's Jorge Lorenzo won his first championship taking 8 victories. Another Aprilia rider took the 125cc crown with Álvaro Bautista also taking 8 wins.

== 2006 Grand Prix season calendar ==
The following Grands Prix were scheduled to take place in 2006:

Round	Date	Grand Prix	Circuit
1	26 March	(Spain) Gran Premio betandwin.com de España	Circuito de Jerez
2	8 April ††	Commercialbank Grand Prix of Qatar	Losail International Circuit
3	30 April	Grand Prix of Turkey	Istanbul Park
4	14 May	Polini Grand Prix of China	Shanghai International Circuit
5	21 May	Alice Grand Prix de France	Bugatti Circuit
6	4 June	(Italy) Gran Premio d'Italia Alice	Mugello Circuit
7	18 June	(Catalonia) Gran Premi Cinzano de Catalunya	Circuit de Catalunya
8	24 June ††	(Netherlands) A-Style TT Assen	TT Circuit Assen
9	2 July	(United Kingdom) Gas British Grand Prix	Donington Park
10	16 July	(Germany) betandwin.com Motorrad Grand Prix Deutschland	Sachsenring
11	23 July †	(United States) Red Bull U.S. Grand Prix	Mazda Raceway Laguna Seca
12	20 August	(Czech Republic) Gauloises Grand Prix České republiky	Brno Circuit
13	10 September	(Malaysia) Marlboro Malaysian Motorcycle Grand Prix	Sepang International Circuit
14	17 September	(Australia) GMC Australian Grand Prix	Phillip Island Grand Prix Circuit
15	24 September	A-Style Grand Prix of Japan	Twin Ring Motegi
16	15 October	bwin.com Grande Prémio de Portugal	Autódromo do Estoril
17	29 October	(Valencian Community) Gran Premio bwin.com de la Comunitat Valenciana	Circuit Ricardo Tormo

† = MotoGP class only
†† = Saturday race

=== Calendar changes ===
- The Qatar Grand Prix was moved forward, from 1 October to 8 April.
- The Turkish Grand Prix was moved forward, from 23 October to 30 April.
- Only the MotoGP class raced during the United States Grand Prix because of a Californian law on air pollution, preventing the 125 and 250cc classes from racing.
- The Portuguese Grand Prix was moved back, from 17 April to 15 October.

== Regulation changes ==
The following changes are made to the regulation for the 2006 season:

=== Sporting regulations ===
- The rule regarding the interruption of a race via a red flag has been reformed. From the moment the red flag is shown, riders who are not competing actively in the race will not be classified. Once five minutes have passed since the showing of the red flag, all riders who have not reached the pits on board their motorcycles will not be classified.
- Rules for licenses have been updated. All Chief Medial Officers (CMO) and Deputy Chief Medical Officers must now be in possession of a license. The license will be valid for a span of three years and be handed out by the FIM.
- Criteria and procedure for the obtainment of a CMO license has been updates. Potential candidates should apply via a letter through their FMN to the FIM including their professional and motorsport CV, as well as evidence that the following criteria has been fulfilled:
  - Be a fully registered and qualified medical practitioner.
  - Be experienced in the supply of Emergency Medical Care.
  - Be experienced at motorcycle events and must have been to at least five national events as CMO or Deputy CMO with a confirmation by their FMN.
  - Have attended and successfully completed a FIM CMO seminar and have taken part in at least one FIM event within the previous two years.
- In the 125cc and 250cc classes, rookie riders will now be allowed to compete in other held at circuit in Europe during a season.

These rules were additionally added on 27 June 2006:

- Practice restrictions have been put in place for the 125cc and 250cc classes. Contracted teams who profit from a Participation Agreement to participate in the 125cc and 250cc class championships are forbidden to practice with their bikes at any circuit between the 1st of December of one year and the 20th of January of the next year, both dates being inclusive.

=== Technical regulations ===
- A change has been made regarding fuel tank regulations. In all classes, fuel tanks made out of non-metallic composite materials must be fitted with a fuel cell bladder or have otherwise passed the appropriate FIM test standards.

== 2006 Grand Prix season results ==
Round	Date	Grand Prix	Circuit	125cc winner	250cc winner	MotoGP winner	Report
1	26 March	(Spain) Spanish motorcycle Grand Prix	Jerez	(Spain) Álvaro Bautista	(Spain) Jorge Lorenzo	(Italy) Loris Capirossi	Report
2	8 April ††	Qatar motorcycle Grand Prix	Losail	(Spain) Álvaro Bautista	(Spain) Jorge Lorenzo	(Italy) Valentino Rossi	Report
3	30 April	(Turkey) Turkish motorcycle Grand Prix	Istanbul	(Spain) Héctor Faubel	(Japan) Hiroshi Aoyama	(Italy) Marco Melandri	Report
4	14 May	(China) Chinese motorcycle Grand Prix	Shanghai	(Finland) Mika Kallio	(Spain) Héctor Barberá	(Spain) Dani Pedrosa	Report
5	21 May	(France) French motorcycle Grand Prix	Le Mans	(Switzerland) Thomas Lüthi	(Japan) Yuki Takahashi	(Italy) Marco Melandri	Report
6	4 June	(Italy) Italian motorcycle Grand Prix	Mugello	(Italy) Mattia Pasini	(Spain) Jorge Lorenzo	(Italy) Valentino Rossi	Report
7	18 June	(Catalonia) Catalan motorcycle Grand Prix	Catalunya	(Spain) Álvaro Bautista	(Italy) Andrea Dovizioso	(Italy) Valentino Rossi	Report
8	24 June ††	(Netherlands) Dutch TT	Assen	(Finland) Mika Kallio	(Spain) Jorge Lorenzo	(United States) Nicky Hayden	Report
9	2 July	(United Kingdom) British motorcycle Grand Prix	Donington	(Spain) Álvaro Bautista	(Spain) Jorge Lorenzo	(Spain) Dani Pedrosa	Report
10	16 July	(Germany) German motorcycle Grand Prix	Sachsenring	(Italy) Mattia Pasini	(Japan) Yuki Takahashi	(Italy) Valentino Rossi	Report
11	23 July †	United States motorcycle Grand Prix	Laguna Seca	No 125cc and 250cc race		(United States) Nicky Hayden	Report
12	20 August	Czech Republic motorcycle Grand Prix	Brno	(Spain) Álvaro Bautista	(Spain) Jorge Lorenzo	(Italy) Loris Capirossi	Report
13	10 September	(Malaysia) Malaysian motorcycle Grand Prix	Sepang	(Spain) Álvaro Bautista	(Spain) Jorge Lorenzo	(Italy) Valentino Rossi	Report
14	17 September	(Australia) Australian motorcycle Grand Prix	Phillip Island	(Spain) Álvaro Bautista	(Spain) Jorge Lorenzo	(Italy) Marco Melandri	Report
15	24 September	(Japan) Japanese motorcycle Grand Prix	Motegi	(Finland) Mika Kallio	(Japan) Hiroshi Aoyama	(Italy) Loris Capirossi	Report
16	15 October	(Portugal) Portuguese motorcycle Grand Prix	Estoril	(Spain) Álvaro Bautista	(Italy) Andrea Dovizioso	(Spain) Toni Elías	Report
17	29 October	Valencian Community motorcycle Grand Prix	Valencia	(Spain) Héctor Faubel	(San Marino) Alex de Angelis	(Australia) Troy Bayliss	Report

† = MotoGP class only
†† = Saturday Race

== Participants ==
=== MotoGP participants ===
Team	Constructor	Motorcycle	Tyres	No.	Rider	Rounds
(Italy) Ducati Marlboro Team	Ducati	Desmosedici GP6	B	15	(Spain) Sete Gibernau	1–7, 10–11, 13–16
(Italy) Ducati Marlboro Team	Ducati	Desmosedici GP6	B	66	(Germany) Alex Hofmann	8–9, 12
(Italy) Ducati Marlboro Team	Ducati	Desmosedici GP6	B	12	(Australia) Troy Bayliss	17
(Italy) Ducati Marlboro Team	Ducati	Desmosedici GP6	B	65	(Italy) Loris Capirossi	All
(Italy) Pramac d'Antin MotoGP	Ducati	Desmosedici GP5	D	30	(Spain) José Luis Cardoso	All
(Italy) Pramac d'Antin MotoGP	Ducati	Desmosedici GP5	D	66	(Germany) Alex Hofmann	1–7, 10–11, 13–17
(Italy) Pramac d'Antin MotoGP	Ducati	Desmosedici GP5	D	22	(Spain) Iván Silva	8–9, 12
(Japan) Repsol Honda Team	Honda	RC211V	M	26	(Spain) Dani Pedrosa	All
(Japan) Repsol Honda Team	Honda	RC211V	M	69	(United States) Nicky Hayden	All
(Italy) Fortuna Honda	Honda	RC211V	M	24	(Spain) Toni Elías	1–8, 10–17
(Italy) Fortuna Honda	Honda	RC211V	M	84	(Italy) Michel Fabrizio	9
(Italy) Fortuna Honda	Honda	RC211V	M	33	(Italy) Marco Melandri	All
(Monaco) Konica Minolta Honda	Honda	RC211V	M	6	(Japan) Makoto Tamada	All
(Monaco) Honda LCR	Honda	RC211V	M	27	(Australia) Casey Stoner	All
(United Kingdom) Ilmor SRT	Ilmor GP	X3	M	8	(Australia) Garry McCoy	16–17
(Japan) Kawasaki Racing Team	Kawasaki	Ninja ZX-RR	B	17	(France) Randy de Puniet	All
(Japan) Kawasaki Racing Team	Kawasaki	Ninja ZX-RR	B	56	(Japan) Shinya Nakano	All
(Japan) Kawasaki	Kawasaki	Ninja ZX-RR	B	8	(Japan) Naoki Matsudo	15
(United States) Team Roberts	Team Roberts	KR211V	M	10	(United States) Kenny Roberts Jr.	All
(Japan) Rizla Suzuki MotoGP	Suzuki	GSV-R	B	21	(United States) John Hopkins	All
(Japan) Rizla Suzuki MotoGP	Suzuki	GSV-R	B	71	(Australia) Chris Vermeulen	All
(Japan) Team Suzuki MotoGP	Suzuki	GSV-R	B	64	(Japan) Kousuke Akiyoshi	15
(Japan) Camel Yamaha Team	Yamaha	YZR-M1	M	5	(United States) Colin Edwards	All
(Japan) Camel Yamaha Team	Yamaha	YZR-M1	M	46	(Italy) Valentino Rossi	All
(France) Tech 3 Yamaha	Yamaha	YZR-M1	D	7	(Spain) Carlos Checa	All
(France) Tech 3 Yamaha	Yamaha	YZR-M1	D	77	(United Kingdom) James Ellison	All

Key
Regular rider
Wildcard rider
Replacement rider

=== 250cc participants ===
According to the official website: www.motogp.com

Team	Constructor	Motorcycle	No.	Rider	Rounds
Red Bull KTM GP 250	KTM	KTM 250 FRR	4	(Japan) Hiroshi Aoyama	1–10, 12–17
Red Bull KTM GP 250	KTM	KTM 250 FRR	54	(San Marino) Manuel Poggiali	1–10, 12–17
Master - MVA Aspar Team	Aprilia	Aprilia RSW 250	7	(San Marino) Alex de Angelis	1–10, 12–17
Kiefer-Bos-Racing	Aprilia	Aprilia RSV 250	14	(Australia) Anthony West	1–10, 12–17
Kiefer-Bos-Racing	Aprilia	Aprilia RSV 250	17	(Germany) Franz Aschenbrenner	6–9
Kiefer-Bos-Racing	Aprilia	Aprilia RSV 250	28	(Germany) Dirk Heidolf	1–5, 10, 12–17
Team Toth	Aprilia	Aprilia RSW 250 LE	15	(Italy) Roberto Locatelli	1–10, 12–17
Equipe GP De France-Scrab	Aprilia	Aprilia RSW 250 LE	16	(France) Jules Cluzel	1–10, 12–17
Equipe GP De France-Scrab	Aprilia	Aprilia RSW 250 LE	50	(France) Sylvain Guintoli	1–10, 12–17
Repsol Honda	Honda	Honda RS250RW	19	(Argentina) Sebastián Porto	1–6
Repsol Honda	Honda	Honda RS250RW	36	(Colombia) Martín Cárdenas	8, 10, 12–14
Repsol Honda	Honda	Honda RS250RW	52	(Spain) José David de Gea	15–17
Repsol Honda	Honda	Honda RS250RW	73	(Japan) Shuhei Aoyama	1–10, 12–17
Arie Molenaar Racing	Honda	Honda RS250R	21	(France) Arnaud Vincent	1–8, 10, 12–15
Arie Molenaar Racing	Honda	Honda RS250R	57	(United Kingdom) Chaz Davies	9
Arie Molenaar Racing	Honda	Honda RS250R	65	(Italy) Alessandro Brannetti	16–17
Nocable Angaia Racing	Aprilia	Aprilia RSV 250	22	(Italy) Luca Morelli	1–10, 12–17
Wurth Honda BQR	Honda	Honda RS250R	23	(Spain) Arturo Tizón	1–10, 12–17
Wurth Honda BQR	Honda	Honda RS250R	36	(Colombia) Martín Cárdenas	1–7
Wurth Honda BQR	Honda	Honda RS250R	40	(Turkey) Sinan Sofuoğlu	1, 3
Wurth Honda BQR	Honda	Honda RS250R	42	(Spain) Aleix Espargaró	8–10, 12–17
Stop and Go Racing Team	Honda	Honda RS250R	24	(Spain) Jordi Carchano	1–3
Stop and Go Racing Team	Honda	Honda RS250R	37	(Argentina) Fabricio Perrén	6–10, 12–17
Matteoni Racing	Aprilia	Aprilia RSV 250	25	(Italy) Alex Baldolini	1–10, 12–17
Matteoni Racing	Aprilia	Aprilia RSV 250	85	(Italy) Alessio Palumbo	1–8, 10, 12–17
Humangest Racing Team	Honda	Honda RS250RW	34	(Italy) Andrea Dovizioso	1–10, 12–17
Humangest Racing Team	Honda	Honda RS250RW	55	(Japan) Yuki Takahashi	1–10, 13–17
WTR Blauer USA	Aprilia	Aprilia RSV 250	41	(Italy) Michele Danese	1–3
WTR Blauer USA	Aprilia	Aprilia RSV 250	24	(Spain) Jordi Carchano	5–10, 12–17
TicinoHosting Campetella Racing	Aprilia	Aprilia RSV 250	44	(Japan) Taro Sekiguchi	1, 12–17
TicinoHosting Campetella Racing	Aprilia	Aprilia RSV 250	57	(United Kingdom) Chaz Davies	1–5
TicinoHosting Campetella Racing	Aprilia	Aprilia RSV 250	8	(Italy) Andrea Ballerini	2–10, 12–17
TicinoHosting Campetella Racing	Aprilia	Aprilia RSV 250	9	(Italy) Franco Battaini	6–10
Fortuna Aprilia	Aprilia	Aprilia RSW 250	48	(Spain) Jorge Lorenzo	1–10, 12–17
Fortuna Aprilia	Aprilia	Aprilia RSW 250	80	(Spain) Héctor Barberá	1–6, 9–10, 12–17
Fortuna Aprilia	Aprilia	Aprilia RSW 250	6	(Spain) Alex Debón	7–8
Aprilia Racing	Aprilia	Aprilia RSW 250	6	(Spain) Alex Debón	1, 6, 12, 17
Squadra Corse Metis Gilera	Gilera	Gilera RSW 250 LE	58	(Italy) Marco Simoncelli	1–10, 12–17
Cardion AB Motoracing	Aprilia	Aprilia RSW 250 LE	96	(Czech Republic) Jakub Smrž	1–10, 12–17
Castrol GP 250 Racing	Honda	Honda RS250R	17	(Germany) Franz Aschenbrenner	10
Burning Blood	Honda	Honda RS250R	20	(Japan) Takumi Takahashi	15
Andalucia Team Mas; Andalucia-GFC-Mas	Aprilia	Aprilia RSV 250	31	(Spain) Álvaro Molina	1, 5, 17
China Zongshen Team	Aprilia	Aprilia RSV 250	32	(Portugal) Joao Fernandes	16
China Zongshen Team	Aprilia	Aprilia RSV 250	56	(China) Rong Zai Su	13, 16
China Zongshen Team	Aprilia	Aprilia RSV 250	59	(China) Ho Chi Fung	4, 13, 16
Teng Tools Winona Racing; Winona Racing	Honda	Honda RS250R	45	(United Kingdom) Dan Linfoot	5–7, 9–10, 12, 16–17
Asmv Scaccia	Aprilia	Aprilia RSV 250	47	(France) Marc-Antoine Scaccia	5
Extremadura Junior	Honda	Honda RS250R	53	(Spain) Santiago Barragán	17
Grillini Racing	Honda	Honda RS250R	57	(United Kingdom) Chaz Davies	17
Grillini Racing	Honda	Honda RS250R	65	(Italy) Alessandro Brannetti	6
Benelli QJ Team of China	Aprilia	Aprilia RSV 250	60	(China) Wang Zhu	4
Benelli QJ Team of China	Aprilia	Aprilia RSV 250	61	(China) Li Zheng Peng	4
Yamaha Tianjian Racing Team	Yamaha	Yamaha TZ 250	62	(China) Huang Shi Zhao	4
Yamaha Tianjian Racing Team	Yamaha	Yamaha TZ 250	63	(China) Xiao Jin	4
VFT Racing	Aprilia	Aprilia RSV 250	64	(Italy) Omar Menghi	6
Jaap Kingma Racing	Aprilia	Aprilia RSV 250	66	(Netherlands) Hans Smees	1
Agesta Racing	Aprilia	Aprilia RSV 250	67	(Sweden) Nicklas Cajback	6, 9–10
DE Arend - Filart Racing	Aprilia	Aprilia RSV 250	68	(Netherlands) Randy Gevers	8
Racing Team Twello Jaap Kingma	Honda	Honda RS250R	69	(Netherlands) Bram Appelo	8
Amici Racing	Honda	Honda RS250R	70	(Netherlands) Raymond Schouten	8
Roelofs Racing Team	Yamaha	Yamaha TZ 250	71	(Netherlands) Jan Roelofs	8
DRT Mototech Road Racing	Honda	Honda RS250R	72	(Belgium) David Drieghe	8
BM Groundworks	Yamaha	Yamaha TZ 250	75	(United Kingdom) Luke Lawrence	9, 12, 16
Dennis Trollope Racing	Yamaha	Yamaha TZ 250	76	(United Kingdom) Alex Kenchington	9
Danx MotorSport	Yamaha	Yamaha TZ 250	77	(United Kingdom) Ian Gardner	9
IMT Racing	Honda	Honda RS250R	78	(Germany) Meik Kevin Minnerop	10
Ewes Racing Team	Aprilia	Aprilia RSV 250	79	(Sweden) Andreas Mårtensson	10
Sramek Racing Promotion	Yamaha	Yamaha TZ 250	82	(Czech Republic) Michal Filla	12
Klub Racing Team Mayer	Honda	Honda RS250R	83	(Czech Republic) Jiří Mayer	12
Danish Road Racing Team	Yamaha	Yamaha TZ 250	84	(Denmark) Kenni Aggerholm	12
RT Morinokumasan Sendai	Yamaha	Yamaha TZ 250	86	(Japan) Ryuji Yokoe	15
Thai Honda Castrol Endurance	Honda	Honda RS250R	87	(Thailand) Ratthapark Wilairot	15
Pro-Tec & Weave	Yamaha	Yamaha TZ 250	88	(Japan) Youichi Ui	15
Will Access With Plus Myu	Yamaha	Yamaha TZ 250	89	(Japan) Seijin Oikawa	15
Dydo Miu Racing	Honda	Honda RS250R	93	(Japan) Kouki Takahashi	15

Key
Regular rider
Wildcard rider
Replacement rider

=== 125cc participants ===
According to the official website: www.motogp.com

Team	Constructor	Motorcycle	No.	Rider	Rounds
Elit - Caffé Latte	Honda	Honda RS125R	1	(Switzerland) Thomas Lüthi	1–10, 12–17
Elit - Caffé Latte	Honda	Honda RS125R	11	(Germany) Sandro Cortese	1–10, 12–17
SSM Racing	Aprilia	Aprilia RS 125 R	6	(Spain) Joan Olivé	1–10, 12–17
SSM Racing	Aprilia	Aprilia RS 125 R	12	(Italy) Federico Sandi	1–10, 12–17
Malaguti Ajo Corse	Malaguti	Malaguti 125	7	(France) Alexis Masbou	1–8, 10, 12–13
Malaguti Ajo Corse	Malaguti	Malaguti 125	40	(Italy) Nico Vivarelli	17
Malaguti Ajo Corse	Malaguti	Malaguti 125	71	(Japan) Tomoyoshi Koyama	1–7, 10, 12–17
Malaguti Ajo Corse	Malaguti	Malaguti 125	73	(Japan) Kazuya Otani	15–16
Malaguti Ajo Corse	Malaguti	Malaguti 125	90	(Japan) Hiroaki Kuzuhara	8–9
Malaguti Ajo Corse	Malaguti	Malaguti 125	95	(Germany) Georg Fröhlich	9
Skilled I.S.P.A. Racing Team	Aprilia	Aprilia RS 125 R	8	(Italy) Lorenzo Zanetti	1–10, 12–17
Red Bull KTM Junior Team	KTM	KTM 125 FRR	9	(Austria) Michael Ranseder	1–9, 12–17
Red Bull KTM Junior Team	KTM	KTM 125 FRR	17	(Germany) Stefan Bradl	1–10, 12–13
Red Bull KTM Junior Team	KTM	KTM 125 FRR	67	(Australia) Blake Leigh-Smith	14–17
Red Bull KTM GP 125	KTM	KTM 125 FRR	36	(Finland) Mika Kallio	1–10, 12–17
Red Bull KTM GP 125	KTM	KTM 125 FRR	54	(Switzerland) Randy Krummenacher	9–10
Red Bull KTM GP 125	KTM	KTM 125 FRR	60	(Spain) Julián Simón	1–7, 12–17
3C Racing	Aprilia	Aprilia RS 125 R	10	(Spain) Ángel Rodríguez	1–10, 12
3C Racing	Aprilia	Aprilia RS 125 R	13	(Italy) Dino Lombardi	3–10, 12–17
3C Racing	Aprilia	Aprilia RS 125 R	38	(Italy) Roberto Lacalendola	13–17
Humangest Racing Team	Honda	Honda RS125R	14	(Hungary) Gábor Talmácsi	1–10, 12–17
Humangest Racing Team	Honda	Honda RS125R	15	(Italy) Michele Pirro	13–14
Humangest Racing Team	Honda	Honda RS125R	23	(Italy) Lorenzo Baroni	1–10
Humangest Racing Team	Honda	Honda RS125R	49	(Japan) Kazuma Watanabe	15–17
Humangest Racing Team	Honda	Honda RS125R	56	(Italy) Stefano Musco	12
WTR Blauer USA	Aprilia	Aprilia RS 125 R	15	(Italy) Michele Pirro	2–10, 12
WTR Blauer USA	Aprilia	Aprilia RS 125 R	29	(Italy) Andrea Iannone	13
WTR Blauer USA	Aprilia	Aprilia RS 125 R	79	(Spain) Enrique Jerez	1
WTR Blauer USA	Aprilia	Aprilia RS 125 R	90	(Japan) Hiroaki Kuzuhara	14–17
Valsir Seedorf Racing	Honda	Honda RS125R	16	(Italy) Michele Conti	1–10, 12–17
Valsir Seedorf Racing	Honda	Honda RS125R	32	(Italy) Fabrizio Lai	1–10, 12–17
Derbi Racing	Derbi	Derbi RS 125 R	18	(Spain) Nicolás Terol	1–10, 12–17
Derbi Racing	Derbi	Derbi RS 125 R	52	(Czech Republic) Lukáš Pešek	1–10, 12–17
Master - MVA Aspar	Aprilia	Aprilia RSA 125	19	(Spain) Álvaro Bautista	16–17
Master - MVA Aspar	Aprilia	Aprilia RS 125 R	19	(Spain) Álvaro Bautista	1–10, 12–15
Master - MVA Aspar	Aprilia	Aprilia RS 125 R	21	(Spain) Mateo Túnez	1–5, 7–10, 12, 16–17
Master - MVA Aspar	Aprilia	Aprilia RS 125 R	33	(Spain) Sergio Gadea	1–10, 12–17
Master - MVA Aspar	Aprilia	Aprilia RS 125 R	55	(Spain) Héctor Faubel	1–10, 12–17
Master - MVA Aspar	Aprilia	Aprilia RS 125 R	75	(Italy) Mattia Pasini	1–10, 12–17
Matteoni Racing	Aprilia	Aprilia RS 125 R	20	(Italy) Roberto Tamburini	1–10, 12–17
Multimedia Racing	Aprilia	Aprilia RS 125 R	22	(Spain) Pablo Nieto	1–10, 12–14, 16–17
Multimedia Racing	Aprilia	Aprilia RS 125 R	25	(Switzerland) Dominique Aegerter	16–17
Multimedia Racing	Aprilia	Aprilia RS 125 R	26	(Switzerland) Vincent Braillard	1–10, 12–15
Multimedia Racing	Aprilia	Aprilia RS 125 R	35	(Italy) Raffaele De Rosa	1–10, 12–17
Squadra Corse Metis Gilera	Gilera	Gilera RS 125 R	24	(Italy) Simone Corsi	1–10, 12–17
TicinoHosting Campetella Junior Team; Campetella Racing Junior	Aprilia	Aprilia RS 125 R	29	(Italy) Andrea Iannone	1–10
TicinoHosting Campetella Junior Team; Campetella Racing Junior	Aprilia	Aprilia RS 125 R	53	(Italy) Simone Grotzkyj	1–10, 12–17
TicinoHosting Campetella Junior Team; Campetella Racing Junior	Derbi	Derbi RS 125 R	42	(Spain) Pol Espargaró	12–17
Honda BQR; Würth Honda BQR	Honda	Honda RS125R	34	(Spain) Esteve Rabat	8–10, 12–17
Honda BQR; Würth Honda BQR	Honda	Honda RS125R	41	(Spain) Aleix Espargaró	1–7
Honda BQR; Würth Honda BQR	Honda	Honda RS125R	80	(Spain) Esteve Rabat	1, 7
Arie Molenaar Racing	Honda	Honda RS125R	37	(Netherlands) Joey Litjens	1–10, 12–17
Repsol Honda	Honda	Honda RS125R	38	(United Kingdom) Bradley Smith	1–10, 12, 14–17
Repsol Honda	Honda	Honda RS125R	39	(United Kingdom) Danny Webb	7
Nocable Angaia Racing	Honda	Honda RS125R	43	(Spain) Manuel Hernández	1
Nocable Angaia Racing	Aprilia	Aprilia RS 125 R	43	(Spain) Manuel Hernández	2–10, 12–17
Cardion AB Motoracing	Aprilia	Aprilia RS 125 R	44	(Czech Republic) Karel Abraham	1–10, 12–17
Team Tóth	Aprilia	Aprilia RS 125 R	45	(Hungary) Imre Tóth	1–10, 12–17
Team Tóth	Aprilia	Aprilia RS 125 R	81	(Romania) Robert Mureșan	12
FFM Honda Grand Prix 125	Honda	Honda RS125R	63	(France) Mike Di Meglio	1–9, 12–16
FFM Honda Grand Prix 125	Honda	Honda RS125R	83	(France) Clément Dunikowski	10, 17
RACC Derbi	Derbi	Derbi RS 125 R	30	(Spain) Pere Tutusaus	17
RACC Derbi	Derbi	Derbi RS 125 R	92	(Spain) Pol Espargaró	7
FRS	Honda	Honda RS125R	47	(Japan) Shoya Tomizawa	15
S-way	Honda	Honda RS125R	48	(Japan) Toshihisa Kuzuhara	15
Plus One	Honda	Honda RS125R	50	(Japan) Hiroomi Iwata	15
Honda Suzuka Racing	Honda	Honda RS125R	51	(Japan) Iori Namihira	15
Red Bull ADAC TM Junior	KTM	KTM 125 FRR	54	(Switzerland) Randy Krummenacher	16–17
Red Bull ADAC TM Junior	KTM	KTM 125 FRR	61	(Germany) Robin Lässer	10
Tom Hatton Racing	Honda	Honda RS125R	57	(Australia) Tom Hatton	14
Tassie WindsScreens	Honda	Honda RS125R	58	(Australia) Brett Symonds	14
Rhys Moller Racing	Honda	Honda RS125R	59	(Australia) Rhys Moller	14
Angelo's Aluminium Racing	Honda	Honda RS125R	62	(Australia) Brent Rigoli	14
Double Vision Racing	Honda	Honda RS125R	64	(United Kingdom) Alex Lowes	9
www.sp125racing.com	Honda	Honda RS125R	65	(United Kingdom) Kyle Kentish	9
KRP; KRP/dancoopers96.com	Honda	Honda RS125R	66	(United Kingdom) Anthony Rogers	9
KRP; KRP/dancoopers96.com	Honda	Honda RS125R	67	(Australia) Blake Leigh-Smith	9
KRP; KRP/dancoopers96.com	Honda	Honda RS125R	96	(United Kingdom) Daniel Cooper	9
Mayer-Racing Passau	Aprilia	Aprilia RS 125 R	68	(Germany) Thomas Mayer	12
Kuja Racing	Honda	Honda RS125R	69	(Czech Republic) Michal Šembera	12, 16
Roha'c & Fejta	Honda	Honda RS125R	70	(Czech Republic) Michal Prášek	12
Sachsenring-Motorrad Unger	Aprilia	Aprilia RS 125 R	72	(Germany) Eric Hübsch	10
Lambea TMM Racing	Honda	Honda RS125R	76	(Spain) Iván Maestro	1, 7
Quinto Almoradi	Aprilia	Aprilia RS 125 R	77	(Spain) Daniel Sáez	1, 17
Varenhof Racing Team	Aprilia	Aprilia RS 125 R	78	(Netherlands) Hugo van den Berg	1, 5, 7–8, 12, 17
Yamaha Indonesia	Yamaha	Yamaha TZ125	80	(Indonesia) Doni Tata Pradita	13
Las Vegas Team Romania	Aprilia	Aprilia RS 125 R	81	(Romania) Robert Mureșan	3, 8
Villiers Team Competition	Honda	Honda RS125R	82	(France) Matthieu Lussiana	5
Équipe de France FFM	Honda	Honda RS125R	83	(France) Clément Dunikowski	5
FP Motorsport	Honda	Honda RS125R	84	(France) Mathieu Olagnon	5
TVX Racing-CTR Distribution	Honda	Honda RS125R	85	(France) Yannick Deschamps	5
China Zongshein Team	Honda	Honda RS125R	86	(China) Ho Wan Chow	4
TicinoHosting-MTR	Honda	Honda RS125R	87	(Italy) Roberto Lacalendola	6
TicinoHosting-MTR	Honda	Honda RS125R	88	(Italy) Daniele Rossi	6
Racing Service	Honda	Honda RS125R	89	(Italy) Nico Vivarelli	6
Grillini Racing	Honda	Honda RS125R	90	(Japan) Hiroaki Kuzuhara	6
RCGM Team	Aprilia	Aprilia RS 125 R	91	(Italy) Luca Verdini	6
Jan Bakker Auto's Racing	Honda	Honda RS125R	93	(Netherlands) Gert-Jan Kok	8
Lemstra Racing	Honda	Honda RS125R	94	(Netherlands) Patrick van de Waarsenburg	8
Abbink Bos Racing	Honda	Honda RS125R	95	(Germany) Georg Fröhlich	8, 10, 16
RZT Racing	Aprilia	Aprilia RS 125 R	97	(Germany) Joshua Sommer	10
Honda Schumann Reisen	Honda	Honda RS125R	98	(Germany) Toni Wirsing	10

Key
Regular rider
Wildcard rider
Replacement rider

== Standings ==
=== MotoGP standings ===
Scoring system

Points were awarded to the top fifteen finishers. A rider had to finish the race to earn points.

Position	**1st**	**2nd**	**3rd**	**4th**	**5th**	**6th**	**7th**	**8th**	**9th**	**10th**	**11th**	**12th**	**13th**	**14th**	**15th**
Points	25	20	16	13	11	10	9	8	7	6	5	4	3	2	1

==== Riders' standings ====
- Rounds marked with a light blue background were under wet race conditions or stopped by rain.
- Riders marked with light blue background were eligible for Rookie of the Year awards.

Pos	Rider	Bike	Team	SPA (Spain)	QAT (Qatar)	TUR (Turkey)	CHN (China)	FRA (France)	ITA (Italy)	CAT (Catalonia)	NED (Netherlands)	GBR (United Kingdom)	GER (Germany)	USA (United States)	CZE (Czech Republic)	MAL (Malaysia)	AUS (Australia)	JPN (Japan)	POR (Portugal)	VAL (Valencian Community)	Pts
1	(United States) Nicky Hayden	Honda	Repsol Honda Team	3	2	3	2	5	3	2	1	7	3	1	9	4	**5**	5	Ret	3	252
2	(Italy) Valentino Rossi	Yamaha	Camel Yamaha Team	14	1	4	Ret	Ret	1	**1**	8	2	1	Ret	**2**	**1**	3	2	**2**	**13**	247
3	(Italy) Loris Capirossi	Ducati	Ducati Marlboro Team	**1**	3	6	8	2	2	DNS	15	9	5	8	1	2	7	**1**	12	2	229
4	(Italy) Marco Melandri	Honda	Fortuna Honda	5	7	1	7	1	6	DNS	7	3	2	3	5	9	1	3	8	5	228
5	(Spain) Dani Pedrosa	Honda	Repsol Honda Team	2	6	14	**1**	**3**	4	Ret	3	**1**	**4**	2	3	3	15	7	Ret	4	215
6	(United States) Kenny Roberts Jr.	KR211V	Team Roberts	8	10	13	13	Ret	8	3	5	5	Ret	4	4	7	14	9	3	8	134
7	(United States) Colin Edwards	Yamaha	Camel Yamaha Team	11	9	9	3	6	12	5	13	6	12	9	10	10	Ret	8	4	9	124
8	(Australia) Casey Stoner	Honda	Honda LCR	6	**5**	2	5	4	Ret	Ret	4	4	DNS	Ret	6	8	6	Ret	Ret	Ret	119
9	(Spain) Toni Elías	Honda	Fortuna Honda	4	8	5	11	9	7	Ret	WD		11	15	11	Ret	9	6	1	6	116
10	(United States) John Hopkins	Suzuki	Rizla Suzuki MotoGP	9	Ret	17	4	15	10	4	**6**	8	10	6	7	6	12	12	6	11	116
11	(Australia) Chris Vermeulen	Suzuki	Rizla Suzuki MotoGP	12	Ret	**7**	Ret	10	14	6	10	16	7	**5**	12	11	2	11	9	Ret	98
12	(Japan) Makoto Tamada	Honda	Konica Minolta Honda	10	14	10	6	7	9	7	11	11	Ret	11	13	14	10	10	5	12	96
13	(Spain) Sete Gibernau	Ducati	Ducati Marlboro Team	Ret	4	11	9	8	**5**	DNS			8	10		5	4	4	Ret		95
14	(Japan) Shinya Nakano	Kawasaki	Kawasaki Racing Team	7	11	8	10	12	11	DSQ	2	Ret	6	Ret	8	Ret	8	Ret	Ret	7	92
15	(Spain) Carlos Checa	Yamaha	Tech 3 Yamaha	13	12	15	14	11	15	8	9	10	9	7	15	12	Ret	14	7	10	75
16	(France) Randy de Puniet	Kawasaki	Kawasaki Racing Team	Ret	Ret	12	12	Ret	13	Ret	14	12	Ret	12	14	13	11	Ret	10	Ret	37
17	(Germany) Alex Hofmann	Ducati	Pramac d'Antin MotoGP	15	15	16	15	13	Ret	10			Ret	14		15	13	16	11	Ret	30
17	(Germany) Alex Hofmann	Ducati	Ducati Marlboro Team								12	13			16						30
18	(United Kingdom) James Ellison	Yamaha	Tech 3 Yamaha	16	13	18	16	14	16	9	Ret	14	13	13	17	16	16	15	13	14	26
19	(Australia) Troy Bayliss	Ducati	Ducati Marlboro Team																	1	25
20	(Spain) José Luis Cardoso	Ducati	Pramac d'Antin MotoGP	Ret	16	Ret	17	Ret	17	11	17	15	14	16	Ret	17	17	Ret	14	Ret	10
21	(Japan) Kousuke Akiyoshi	Suzuki	Team Suzuki MotoGP															13			3
22	(Australia) Garry McCoy	Ilmor	Ilmor SRT																15	15	2
	(Spain) Iván Silva	Ducati	Pramac d'Antin MotoGP								16	Ret			18						0
	(Japan) Naoki Matsudo	Kawasaki	Kawasaki															Ret			0
	(Italy) Michel Fabrizio	Honda	Fortuna Honda									WD									0
Pos	Rider	Bike	Team	SPA (Spain)	QAT (Qatar)	TUR (Turkey)	CHN (China)	FRA (France)	ITA (Italy)	CAT (Catalonia)	NED (Netherlands)	GBR (United Kingdom)	GER (Germany)	USA (United States)	CZE (Czech Republic)	MAL (Malaysia)	AUS (Australia)	JPN (Japan)	POR (Portugal)	VAL (Valencian Community)	Pts

Colour	Result
Gold	Winner
Silver	Second place
Bronze	Third place
Green	Points classification
Blue	Non-points classification
Blue	Non-classified finish (NC)
Purple	Retired, not classified (Ret)
Red	Did not qualify (DNQ)
Red	Did not pre-qualify (DNPQ)
Black	Disqualified (DSQ)
White	Did not start (DNS)
White	Withdrew (WD)
White	Race cancelled (C)
Blank	Did not practice (DNP)
Blank	Did not arrive (DNA)
Blank	Excluded (EX)

**Bold** – Pole position
Italics – Fastest lap

==== Constructors' standings ====
- Each constructor got the same number of points as their best placed rider in each race.
- Rounds marked with a light blue background were under wet race conditions or stopped by rain.

Pos	Constructor	SPA (Spain)	QAT (Qatar)	TUR (Turkey)	CHN (China)	FRA (France)	ITA (Italy)	CAT (Catalonia)	NED (Netherlands)	GBR (United Kingdom)	GER (Germany)	USA (United States)	CZE (Czech Republic)	MAL (Malaysia)	AUS (Australia)	JPN (Japan)	POR (Portugal)	VAL (Valencian Community)	Pts
1	(Japan) Honda	2	2	1	1	1	3	2	1	1	2	1	3	3	1	3	1	3	360
2	(Japan) Yamaha	11	1	4	3	6	1	1	8	2	1	7	2	1	3	2	2	9	289
3	(Italy) Ducati	1	3	6	8	2	2	10	12	9	5	8	1	2	4	1	11	1	248
4	(Japan) Suzuki	9	Ret	7	4	10	10	4	6	8	7	5	7	6	2	11	6	11	151
5	(United States) KR211V	8	10	13	13	Ret	8	3	5	5	Ret	4	4	7	14	9	3	8	134
6	(Japan) Kawasaki	7	11	8	10	12	11	Ret	2	12	6	12	8	13	8	Ret	10	7	109
7	(United Kingdom) Ilmor X3																15	15	2
Pos	Constructor	SPA (Spain)	QAT (Qatar)	TUR (Turkey)	CHN (China)	FRA (France)	ITA (Italy)	CAT (Catalonia)	NED (Netherlands)	GBR (United Kingdom)	GER (Germany)	USA (United States)	CZE (Czech Republic)	MAL (Malaysia)	AUS (Australia)	JPN (Japan)	POR (Portugal)	VAL (Valencian Community)	Pts

==== Teams' standings ====
- Each team got the total points scored by their two riders, including replacement riders. In one rider team, only the points scored by that rider was counted. Wildcard riders did not score points.
- Rounds marked with a light blue background were under wet race conditions or stopped by rain.

Pos	Team	Bike No.	SPA (Spain)	QAT (Qatar)	TUR (Turkey)	CHN (China)	FRA (France)	ITA (Italy)	CAT (Catalonia)	NED (Netherlands)	GBR (United Kingdom)	GER (Germany)	USA (United States)	CZE (Czech Republic)	MAL (Malaysia)	AUS (Australia)	JPN (Japan)	POR (Portugal)	VAL (Valencian Community)	Pts
1	(Japan) Repsol Honda Team	26	2	6	14	**1**	**3**	4	Ret	3	**1**	**4**	2	3	3	15	7	Ret	4	467
1	(Japan) Repsol Honda Team	69	3	2	3	2	5	3	2	1	7	3	1	9	4	**5**	5	Ret	3	467
2	(Japan) Camel Yamaha Team	5	11	9	9	3	6	12	5	13	6	12	9	10	10	Ret	8	4	9	371
2	(Japan) Camel Yamaha Team	46	14	1	4	Ret	Ret	1	**1**	8	2	1	Ret	**2**	**1**	3	2	**2**	**13**	371
3	(Italy) Ducati Marlboro Team	12																	1	356
3	(Italy) Ducati Marlboro Team	15	Ret	4	11	9	8	**5**	DNS			8	10		5	4	4	Ret		356
3	(Italy) Ducati Marlboro Team	65	**1**	3	6	8	2	2	DNS	15	9	5	8	1	2	7	**1**	12	2	356
3	(Italy) Ducati Marlboro Team	66								12	13			16						356
4	(Italy) Fortuna Honda	24	4	8	5	11	9	7	Ret	WD		11	15	11	Ret	9	6	1	6	344
4	(Italy) Fortuna Honda	33	5	7	1	7	1	6	DNS	7	3	2	3	5	9	1	3	8	5	344
4	(Italy) Fortuna Honda	84									WD									344
5	(Japan) Rizla Suzuki MotoGP	21	9	Ret	17	4	15	10	4	**6**	8	10	6	7	6	12	12	6	11	214
5	(Japan) Rizla Suzuki MotoGP	71	12	Ret	**7**	Ret	10	14	6	10	16	7	**5**	12	11	2	11	9	Ret	214
6	(United States) Team Roberts	10	8	10	13	13	Ret	8	3	5	5	Ret	4	4	7	14	9	3	8	134
7	(Japan) Kawasaki Racing Team	14	Ret	Ret	12	12	Ret	13	Ret	14	12	Ret	12	14	13	11	Ret	10	Ret	129
7	(Japan) Kawasaki Racing Team	56	7	11	8	10	12	11	DSQ	2	Ret	6	Ret	8	Ret	8	Ret	Ret	7	129
8	(Monaco) Honda LCR	27	6	**5**	2	5	4	Ret	Ret	4	4	DNS	Ret	6	8	6	Ret	Ret	Ret	119
9	(France) Tech 3 Yamaha	7	13	12	15	14	11	15	8	9	10	9	7	15	12	Ret	14	7	10	101
9	(France) Tech 3 Yamaha	77	16	13	18	16	14	16	9	Ret	14	13	13	17	16	16	15	13	14	101
10	(Monaco) Konica Minolta Honda	6	10	14	10	6	7	9	7	11	11	Ret	11	13	14	10	10	5	12	96
11	(Italy) Pramac d'Antin MotoGP	22								16	Ret			18						33
11	(Italy) Pramac d'Antin MotoGP	30	Ret	16	Ret	17	Ret	17	11	17	15	14	16	Ret	17	17	Ret	14	Ret	33
11	(Italy) Pramac d'Antin MotoGP	66	15	15	16	15	13	Ret	10			Ret	14		15	13	16	11	Ret	33
Pos	Team	Bike No.	SPA (Spain)	QAT (Qatar)	TUR (Turkey)	CHN (China)	FRA (France)	ITA (Italy)	CAT (Catalonia)	NED (Netherlands)	GBR (United Kingdom)	GER (Germany)	USA (United States)	CZE (Czech Republic)	MAL (Malaysia)	AUS (Australia)	JPN (Japan)	POR (Portugal)	VAL (Valencian Community)	Pts

=== 250cc standings ===
Scoring system

Points were awarded to the top fifteen finishers. A rider had to finish the race to earn points.

Position	**1st**	**2nd**	**3rd**	**4th**	**5th**	**6th**	**7th**	**8th**	**9th**	**10th**	**11th**	**12th**	**13th**	**14th**	**15th**
Points	25	20	16	13	11	10	9	8	7	6	5	4	3	2	1

==== Riders' standings ====
- Rounds marked with a light blue background were under wet race conditions or stopped by rain.
- Riders marked with light blue background were eligible for Rookie of the Year awards.

Pos	Rider	Bike	SPA (Spain)	QAT (Qatar)	TUR (Turkey)	CHN (China)	FRA (France)	ITA (Italy)	CAT (Catalonia)	NED (Netherlands)	GBR (United Kingdom)	GER (Germany)	CZE (Czech Republic)	MAL (Malaysia)	AUS (Australia)	JPN (Japan)	POR (Portugal)	VAL (Valencian Community)	Pts
1	(Spain) Jorge Lorenzo	Aprilia	**1**	**1**	**Ret**	4	Ret	**1**	2	**1**	**1**	**3**	**1**	1	**1**	**3**	5	4	289
2	(Italy) Andrea Dovizioso	Honda	3	2	3	2	**2**	3	**1**	3	6	4	2	2	4	4	1	7	272
3	(San Marino) Alex de Angelis	Aprilia	2	Ret	12	Ret	5	2	3	2	2	2	Ret	3	2	2	3	1	228
4	(Japan) Hiroshi Aoyama	KTM	6	5	1	3	4	Ret	6	9	3	8	3	Ret	3	1	2	**Ret**	193
5	(Italy) Roberto Locatelli	Aprilia	7	3	4	7	6	6	4	5	4	6	4	5	7	5	**4**	2	191
6	(Japan) Yuki Takahashi	Honda	4	9	5	5	1	4	7	6	7	1		4	Ret	Ret	6	WD	156
7	(Spain) Héctor Barberá	Aprilia	5	4	2	**1**	7	Ret			5	5	5	**Ret**	6	7	10	3	152
8	(Japan) Shuhei Aoyama	Honda	Ret	13	Ret	8	3	9	Ret	12	13	9	6	6	5	6	Ret	6	99
9	(France) Sylvain Guintoli	Aprilia	9	6	6	12	9	11	8	Ret	8	10	8	7	Ret	Ret	8	10	96
10	(Italy) Marco Simoncelli	Gilera	Ret	8	11	6	8	7	Ret	7	10	Ret	9	8	10	9	7	Ret	92
11	(Australia) Anthony West	Aprilia	Ret	Ret	9	9	11	8	9	8	9	7	Ret	15	9	11	9	19	78
12	(Czech Republic) Jakub Smrž	Aprilia	Ret	10	7	10	10	Ret	Ret	Ret	11	14	10	Ret	8	Ret	11	11	58
13	(Spain) Alex Debón	Aprilia	DNS					5	5	4			12					5	50
14	(San Marino) Manuel Poggiali	KTM	11	14	15	11	17	12	11	10	Ret	13	Ret	Ret	13	12	12	8	50
15	(Colombia) Martín Cárdenas	Honda	8	11	13	13	13	Ret	10	Ret		Ret	7	Ret	WD				37
16	(Italy) Alex Baldolini	Aprilia	Ret	Ret	8	14	19	Ret	Ret	11	16	11	WD	WD	18	14	Ret	12	26
17	(Italy) Andrea Ballerini	Aprilia		12		16	12	10	12	Ret	15	Ret	13	Ret	16	Ret	15	15	24
18	(Argentina) Sebastián Porto	Honda	Ret	7	10	Ret	14	13	WD										20
19	(Spain) Aleix Espargaró	Honda								15	12	15	Ret	9	15	Ret	13	13	20
20	(France) Jules Cluzel	Aprilia	Ret	Ret	16	18	Ret	Ret	13	Ret	14	18	Ret	10	12	17	Ret	Ret	15
21	(Germany) Dirk Heidolf	Aprilia	15	15	14	15	18					16	11	Ret	11	16	16	Ret	15
22	(France) Arnaud Vincent	Honda	10	16	Ret	Ret	15	Ret	16	DNQ		Ret	14	11	Ret	DNS			14
23	(Spain) Arturo Tizón	Honda	12	Ret	Ret	19	16	14	14	14	17	Ret	15	Ret	Ret	21	20	18	11
24	(Spain) José David de Gea	Honda														Ret	14	9	9
25	(Japan) Ryuji Yokoe	Yamaha														8			8
26	(Italy) Franco Battaini	Aprilia						Ret	Ret	13	18	12							7
27	(Argentina) Fabricio Perren	Honda						15	15	16	Ret	17	16	Ret	14	15	17	14	7
28	(Thailand) Ratthapark Wilairot	Honda														10			6
29	(Spain) Jordi Carchano	Honda	18	Ret	17														4
29	(Spain) Jordi Carchano	Aprilia					22	Ret	17	17	Ret	20	18	12	17	22	19	22	4
30	(Japan) Seijin Oikawa	Yamaha														13			3
31	(Japan) Taro Sekiguchi	Aprilia	DNS										17	13	19	18	18	16	3
32	(United Kingdom) Chaz Davies	Aprilia	13	17	Ret	17	Ret												3
32	(United Kingdom) Chaz Davies	Honda									Ret							21	3
33	(Italy) Luca Morelli	Aprilia	Ret	18	18	Ret	21	Ret	19	18	19	21	DNS	14	20	Ret	21	24	2
34	(Spain) Álvaro Molina	Aprilia	14				20											17	2
	(Italy) Michele Danese	Aprilia	16	19	Ret														0
	(China) Ho Chi Fung	Aprilia				Ret								16			DNQ		0
	(Italy) Omar Menghi	Honda						16											0
	(United Kingdom) Dan Linfoot	Honda					Ret	17	Ret		Ret	19	Ret				Ret	Ret	0
	(China) Su Rong Zai	Aprilia												17			DNQ		0
	(Netherlands) Hans Smees	Aprilia	17																0
	(Italy) Alessio Palumbo	Aprilia	Ret	20	Ret	Ret	23	18	18	DNQ		WD	DNQ	18	DNQ	24	22	Ret	0
	(Germany) Franz Aschenbrenner	Aprilia						19	Ret	19	20								0
	(Germany) Franz Aschenbrenner	Honda										23							0
	(Turkey) Sinan Sofuoğlu	Honda	DNQ		19														0
	(Japan) Youichi Ui	Yamaha														19			0
	(Denmark) Kenni Aggerholm	Yamaha											19						0
	(Italy) Alessandro Brannetti	Aprilia						Ret									Ret	20	0
	(Japan) Kouki Takahashi	Honda														20			0
	(Netherlands) Raymond Schouten	Honda								20									0
	(China) Shi Zhao Huang	Yamaha				20													0
	(Sweden) Nicklas Cajback	Aprilia						Ret			21	Ret							0
	(Netherlands) Randy Gevers	Aprilia								21									0
	(China) Jin Xiao	Yamaha				21													0
	(Germany) Meik Kevin Minnerop	Honda										22							0
	(Netherlands) Bram Appelo	Honda								22									0
	(United Kingdom) Luke Lawrence	Yamaha									Ret		DNQ				23		0
	(Spain) Santiago Barragán	Honda																23	0
	(Japan) Takumi Takahashi	Honda														23			0
	(Netherlands) Jan Roelofs	Yamaha								23									0
	(Portugal) João Fernandes	Aprilia															24		0
	(Czech Republic) Michal Filla	Yamaha											Ret						0
	(Sweden) Andreas Mårtensson	Aprilia										Ret							0
	(China) Zhu Wang	Aprilia				Ret													0
	(Czech Republic) Jiří Mayer	Honda											DNQ						0
	(United Kingdom) Alex Kenchington	Yamaha									DNQ								0
	(United Kingdom) Ian Gardner	Yamaha									DNQ								0
	(Belgium) David Drieghe	Honda								DNQ									0
	(China) Zheng Peng Li	Aprilia				DNQ													0
	(France) Marc Antoine Scaccia	Aprilia					DNQ												0
Pos	Rider	Bike	SPA (Spain)	QAT (Qatar)	TUR (Turkey)	CHN (China)	FRA (France)	ITA (Italy)	CAT (Catalonia)	NED (Netherlands)	GBR (United Kingdom)	GER (Germany)	CZE (Czech Republic)	MAL (Malaysia)	AUS (Australia)	JPN (Japan)	POR (Portugal)	VAL (Valencian Community)	Pts

Colour	Result
Gold	Winner
Silver	Second place
Bronze	Third place
Green	Points classification
Blue	Non-points classification
Blue	Non-classified finish (NC)
Purple	Retired, not classified (Ret)
Red	Did not qualify (DNQ)
Red	Did not pre-qualify (DNPQ)
Black	Disqualified (DSQ)
White	Did not start (DNS)
White	Withdrew (WD)
White	Race cancelled (C)
Blank	Did not practice (DNP)
Blank	Did not arrive (DNA)
Blank	Excluded (EX)

**Bold** – Pole position
Italics – Fastest lap

==== Constructors' standings ====
- Each constructor got the same number of points as their best placed rider in each race.
- Rounds marked with a light blue background were under wet race conditions or stopped by rain.

Pos	Constructor	SPA (Spain)	QAT (Qatar)	TUR (Turkey)	CHN (China)	FRA (France)	ITA (Italy)	CAT (Catalonia)	NED (Netherlands)	GBR (United Kingdom)	GER (Germany)	CZE (Czech Republic)	MAL (Malaysia)	AUS (Australia)	JPN (Japan)	POR (Portugal)	VAL (Valencian Community)	Pts
1	(Italy) Aprilia	1	1	2	1	5	1	2	1	1	2	1	1	1	2	3	1	357
2	(Japan) Honda	3	2	3	2	1	3	1	3	6	1	2	2	4	4	1	6	290
3	(Austria) KTM	6	5	1	3	4	12	6	9	3	8	3	Ret	3	1	2	8	205
4	(Italy) Gilera	Ret	8	11	6	8	7	Ret	7	10	Ret	9	8	10	9	7	Ret	92
5	(Japan) Yamaha				20				23	Ret		19			8	23		8
Pos	Constructor	SPA (Spain)	QAT (Qatar)	TUR (Turkey)	CHN (China)	FRA (France)	ITA (Italy)	CAT (Catalonia)	NED (Netherlands)	GBR (United Kingdom)	GER (Germany)	CZE (Czech Republic)	MAL (Malaysia)	AUS (Australia)	JPN (Japan)	POR (Portugal)	VAL (Valencian Community)	Pts

=== 125cc standings ===
Scoring system

Points were awarded to the top fifteen finishers. A rider had to finish the race to earn points.

Position	**1st**	**2nd**	**3rd**	**4th**	**5th**	**6th**	**7th**	**8th**	**9th**	**10th**	**11th**	**12th**	**13th**	**14th**	**15th**
Points	25	20	16	13	11	10	9	8	7	6	5	4	3	2	1

==== Riders' standings ====
- Rounds marked with a light blue background were under wet race conditions or stopped by rain.
- Riders marked with light blue background were eligible for Rookie of the Year awards.

Pos	Rider	Bike	SPA (Spain)	QAT (Qatar)	TUR (Turkey)	CHN (China)	FRA (France)	ITA (Italy)	CAT (Catalonia)	NED (Netherlands)	GBR (United Kingdom)	GER (Germany)	CZE (Czech Republic)	MAL (Malaysia)	AUS (Australia)	JPN (Japan)	POR (Portugal)	VAL (Valencian Community)	Pts
1	(Spain) Álvaro Bautista	Aprilia	1	**1**	**2**	3	4	2	**1**	3	**1**	2	1	**1**	1	**2**	**1**	**4**	338
2	(Finland) Mika Kallio	KTM	4	2	Ret	**1**	2	6	Ret	**1**	2	8	**2**	2	**2**	1	3	2	262
3	(Spain) Héctor Faubel	Aprilia	6	6	1	7	14	5	2	6	4	4	Ret	3	13	6	2	1	197
4	(Italy) Mattia Pasini	Aprilia	**3**	4	17	2	**Ret**	1	4	7	3	1	6	7	3	4	Ret	9	192
5	(Spain) Sergio Gadea	Aprilia	7	3	3	11	8	4	3	2	5	10	4	6	DNS	20	15	3	160
6	(Czech Republic) Lukáš Pešek	Derbi	2	Ret	7	6	Ret	**3**	5	5	7	**3**	Ret	9	6	5	4	5	154
7	(Hungary) Gábor Talmácsi	Honda	8	11	6	4	17	8	8	11	10	14	3	8	9	9	8	8	119
8	(Switzerland) Thomas Lüthi	Honda	Ret	8	12	Ret	1	9	6	8	8	6	5	13	4	Ret	Ret	10	113
9	(Spain) Julián Simón	KTM	5	10	11	5	12	7	Ret				Ret	4	5	3	5	Ret	97
10	(Spain) Joan Olivé	Aprilia	9	Ret	5	14	7	13	9	12	6	9	8	5	10	Ret	Ret	20	85
11	(Italy) Fabrizio Lai	Honda	Ret	14	13	8	3	11	10	Ret	11	11	10	11	8	11	7	Ret	83
12	(Italy) Simone Corsi	Gilera	11	9	4	10	10	10	Ret	4	13	5	15	15	DNS	WD	9	19	79
13	(Spain) Pablo Nieto	Aprilia	10	5	14	Ret	5	12	7	9	Ret	Ret	9	Ret	DNS		DNS	7	66
14	(Spain) Nicolás Terol	Derbi	19	16	27	19	Ret	18	11	15	9	7	7	10	11	10	Ret	11	53
15	(Japan) Tomoyoshi Koyama	Malaguti	12	15	9	9	13	15	DNS			15	16	Ret	12	7	6	14	49
16	(Italy) Raffaele De Rosa	Aprilia	Ret	12	24	12	6	17	12	10	Ret	20	Ret	Ret	7	Ret	19	Ret	37
17	(Germany) Sandro Cortese	Honda	16	Ret	16	17	15	Ret	19	14	14	13	11	17	14	14	10	18	23
18	(Spain) Ángel Rodríguez	Aprilia	Ret	7	10	Ret	11	Ret	Ret	Ret	19	Ret	17						20
19	(United Kingdom) Bradley Smith	Honda	17	22	Ret	22	21	19	16	16	12	12	DNS		28	8	Ret	12	20
20	(Spain) Pol Espargaró	Derbi							13				Ret	14	16	19	12	6	19
21	(Italy) Lorenzo Zanetti	Aprilia	13	21	8	Ret	Ret	14	15	17	15	17	Ret	Ret	19	Ret	13	15	18
22	(Italy) Andrea Iannone	Aprilia	15	13	15	13	9	DSQ	17	Ret	17	24		DNS					15
23	(Spain) Esteve Rabat	Honda	30						Ret	25	Ret	31	Ret	12	Ret	12	17	13	11
24	(Czech Republic) Karel Abraham	Aprilia	23	24	22	26	25	Ret	21	Ret	28	Ret	Ret	18	17	13	11	Ret	8
25	(France) Mike Di Meglio	Honda	21	Ret	Ret	15	27	Ret	18	13	16		13	Ret	15	Ret	Ret		8
26	(Germany) Stefan Bradl	KTM	DNQ	26	19	20	18	16	WD	31	Ret	18	12	DNS					4
27	(Italy) Federico Sandi	Aprilia	14	Ret	35	23	DNQ	Ret	22	Ret	23	22	Ret	16	Ret	Ret	14	22	4
28	(Spain) Manuel Hernández	Honda	18																4
28	(Spain) Manuel Hernández	Aprilia		19	18	21	22	DSQ	14	18	Ret	28	14	22	Ret	24	24	21	4
29	(Japan) Hiroaki Kuzuhara	Honda						20											1
29	(Japan) Hiroaki Kuzuhara	Malaguti								28	26								1
29	(Japan) Hiroaki Kuzuhara	Aprilia													25	15	Ret	27	1
	(Switzerland) Randy Krummenacher	KTM									20	16					16	Ret	0
	(Spain) Aleix Espargaró	Honda	Ret	17	21	16	DNQ	Ret	Ret										0
	(Austria) Michael Ranseder	KTM	20	Ret	26	33	16	Ret	Ret	22	18		18	20	20	23	Ret	24	0
	(Spain) Mateo Túnez	Aprilia	28	25	25	28	Ret		24	NC	21	30	21				23	16	0
	(Italy) Simone Grotzkyj	Aprilia	31	23	30	24	Ret	24	Ret	26	24	Ret	29	DNS	21	16	Ret	28	0
	(Italy) Roberto Tamburini	Aprilia	34	29	31	29	Ret	28	30	27	29	Ret	22	19	22	18	Ret	17	0
	(Switzerland) Vincent Braillard	Aprilia	25	20	32	30	28	26	23	21	22	21	Ret	DNS	23	17			0
	(Italy) Michele Conti	Honda	29	28	23	18	Ret	29	Ret	20	25	26	26	21	18	28	21	23	0
	(Italy) Michele Pirro	Aprilia		18	Ret	25	23	Ret	20	Ret	Ret	23	19	24	Ret				0
	(Hungary) Imre Tóth	Aprilia	26	Ret	29	32	20	25	27	29	Ret	27	20	23	Ret	25	18	33	0
	(Italy) Lorenzo Baroni	Honda	22	30	28	Ret	19	Ret	25	24	27	29							0
	(Germany) Georg Fröhlich	Honda								23		19					29		0
	(Germany) Georg Fröhlich	Malaguti									32								0
	(Netherlands) Joey Litjens	Honda	33	27	34	27	24	Ret	29	19	DNS	Ret	25	Ret	DNS	29	25	25	0
	(France) Alexis Masbou	Malaguti	DNS	DNS	20	Ret	29	Ret	Ret	Ret		25	23	DNS					0
	(Japan) Kazuma Watanabe	Honda														Ret	20	30	0
	(Italy) Roberto Lacalendola	Honda						23											0
	(Italy) Roberto Lacalendola	Aprilia												25	26	21	DNS	34	0
	(Italy) Daniele Rossi	Honda						21											0
	(Italy) Dino Lombardi	Aprilia			33	31	30	27	26	30	NC	Ret	28	Ret	24	26	22	31	0
	(Australia) Blake Leigh-Smith	Honda									31								0
	(Australia) Blake Leigh-Smith	KTM													27	22	27	32	0
	(Italy) Luca Verdini	Aprilia						22											0
	(Netherlands) Hugo van den Berg	Aprilia	27				26		28	Ret			24					Ret	0
	(Spain) Enrique Jerez	Aprilia	24																0
	(Switzerland) Dominique Aegerter	Aprilia															26	29	0
	(Spain) Pere Tutusaus	Derbi																26	0
	(Indonesia) Doni Tata Pradita	Yamaha												26					0
	(Romania) Robert Mureșan	Aprilia			DNQ					32			27						0
	(Japan) Hiroomi Iwata	Honda														27			0
	(Japan) Kazuya Otani	Malaguti														Ret	28		0
	(Czech Republic) Michal Šembera	Honda											31				30		0
	(Japan) Toshihisa Kuzuhara	Honda														30			0
	(Germany) Thomas Mayer	Aprilia											30						0
	(United Kingdom) Anthony Rogers	Honda									30								0
	(Japan) Iori Namihira	Honda														31			0
	(France) Yannick Deschamps	Honda					31												0
	(Spain) Daniel Sáez	Aprilia	32															36	0
	(Czech Republic) Michal Prášek	Honda											32						0
	(Germany) Toni Wirsing	Honda										32							0
	(Italy) Stefano Musco	Honda											33						0
	(United Kingdom) Kyle Kentish	Honda									33								0
	(Netherlands) Patrick van de Waarsenburg	Honda								33									0
	(Italy) Nico Vivarelli	Honda						Ret											0
	(Italy) Nico Vivarelli	Malaguti																35	0
	(France) Clément Dunikowski	Honda					DNS					Ret						37	0
	(Spain) Iván Maestro	Honda	Ret						DNQ										0
	(Japan) Shoya Tomizawa	Honda														Ret			0
	(Australia) Rhys Moller	Honda													Ret				0
	(Germany) Robin Lässer	KTM										Ret							0
	(Germany) Eric Hübsch	Aprilia										Ret							0
	(United Kingdom) Daniel Cooper	Honda									Ret								0
	(United Kingdom) Alex Lowes	Honda									Ret								0
	(Netherlands) Gert-Jan Kok	Honda								Ret									0
	(France) Matthieu Lussiana	Honda					Ret												0
	(China) Ho Wan Chow	Honda				DSQ													0
	(Germany) Joshua Sommer	Aprilia										DNS							0
	(France) Mathieu Olagnon	Honda					DNS												0
	(Australia) Brett Symonds	Honda													DNQ				0
	(Australia) Tom Hatton	Honda													DNQ				0
	(Australia) Brent Rigoli	Honda													DNQ				0
	(United Kingdom) Danny Webb	Honda							DNQ										0
Pos	Rider	Bike	SPA (Spain)	QAT (Qatar)	TUR (Turkey)	CHN (China)	FRA (France)	ITA (Italy)	CAT (Catalonia)	NED (Netherlands)	GBR (United Kingdom)	GER (Germany)	CZE (Czech Republic)	MAL (Malaysia)	AUS (Australia)	JPN (Japan)	POR (Portugal)	VAL (Valencian Community)	Pts

Colour	Result
Gold	Winner
Silver	Second place
Bronze	Third place
Green	Points classification
Blue	Non-points classification
Blue	Non-classified finish (NC)
Purple	Retired, not classified (Ret)
Red	Did not qualify (DNQ)
Red	Did not pre-qualify (DNPQ)
Black	Disqualified (DSQ)
White	Did not start (DNS)
White	Withdrew (WD)
White	Race cancelled (C)
Blank	Did not practice (DNP)
Blank	Did not arrive (DNA)
Blank	Excluded (EX)

**Bold** – Pole position
Italics – Fastest lap

==== Constructors' standings ====
- Each constructor got the same number of points as their best placed rider in each race.
- Rounds marked with a light blue background were under wet race conditions or stopped by rain.

Pos	Constructor	SPA (Spain)	QAT (Qatar)	TUR (Turkey)	CHN (China)	FRA (France)	ITA (Italy)	CAT (Catalonia)	NED (Netherlands)	GBR (United Kingdom)	GER (Germany)	CZE (Czech Republic)	MAL (Malaysia)	AUS (Australia)	JPN (Japan)	POR (Portugal)	VAL (Valencian Community)	Pts
1	(Italy) Aprilia	1	1	1	2	4	1	1	2	1	1	1	1	1	2	1	1	373
2	(Austria) KTM	4	2	11	1	2	6	Ret	1	2	8	2	2	2	1	3	2	267
3	(Japan) Honda	8	8	6	4	1	8	6	8	8	6	3	8	4	8	7	8	170
4	(Spain) Derbi	2	16	7	6	Ret	3	5	5	7	3	7	9	6	5	4	5	163
5	(Italy) Gilera	11	9	4	10	10	10	Ret	4	13	5	15	15	DNS	DNQ	9	19	79
6	(Italy) Malaguti	12	15	9	9	13	15	Ret	28	26	15	16	Ret	12	7	6	14	49
Pos	Constructor	SPA (Spain)	QAT (Qatar)	TUR (Turkey)	CHN (China)	FRA (France)	ITA (Italy)	CAT (Catalonia)	NED (Netherlands)	GBR (United Kingdom)	GER (Germany)	CZE (Czech Republic)	MAL (Malaysia)	AUS (Australia)	JPN (Japan)	POR (Portugal)	VAL (Valencian Community)	Pts
