= Seijin =

- Gender: Male

Origin
- Origin: Japanese
- Meaning: Different meanings depending on the kanji used

Seijin (written: 誠人 or 誠仁) is a masculine Japanese given name. Notable people with the name include:

- Seijin Noborikawa (登川 誠仁; 1932–2013), Japanese musician and singer
- Seijin Oikawa (及川 誠人; born 1970), Japanese motorcycle racer
