= Luke Lawrence =

Luke Lawrence may refer to:

- Luke Lawrence (sailor) (born 1990), American sailor
- Luke Lawrence (motorcyclist), British motorcyclist
- Luke Lawrence (soccer), soccer player, see 2018 PDL season
