= Kyle Kentish =

British motorcycle racer

- Nationality: British
- Born: 21 July 1985 (age 41); Hillington, Scotland, United Kingdom

Kyle Kentish is a Grand Prix motorcycle racer from the United Kingdom.

== Career statistics ==
=== By season ===
Season	Class	Motorcycle	Team	Race	Win	Podium	Pole	FLap	Pts	Plcd
2006	125cc	Honda	www.sp125racing.com	1	0	0	0	0	0	NC
Total				1	0	0	0	0	0	

=== Races by year ===
(key)

Year	Class	Bike	1	2	3	4	5	6	7	8	9	10	11	12	13	14	15	16	Pos.	Pts
2006	125cc	Honda	SPA	QAT	TUR	CHN	FRA	ITA	CAT	NED	GBR; 33	GER	CZE	MAL	AUS	JPN	POR	VAL	NC	0
