= Clément Dunikowski =

French motorcycle racer

- Nationality: French
- Born: 11 February 1991 (age 35) dans la Somme, France

Clément Dunikowski is a Grand Prix motorcycle racer from France.

== Career statistics ==
=== By season ===
Season	Class	Motorcycle	Team	Race	Win	Podium	Pole	FLap	Pts	Plcd
2006	125cc	Honda	FFM Honda Grand Prix 125	2	0	0	0	0	0	NC
Total				2	0	0	0	0	0	

=== Races by year ===
(key)

Year	Class	Bike	1	2	3	4	5	6	7	8	9	10	11	12	13	14	15	16	Pos.	Pts
2006	125cc	Honda	SPA	QAT	TUR	CHN	FRA	ITA	CAT	NED	GBR	GER; Ret	CZE	MAL	AUS	JPN	POR	VAL; 37	NC	0
