= Stefano Musco =

Italian motorcycle racer

- Nationality: Italian
- Born: 17 May 1989 (age 37); Spoleto, Italy

Stefano Musco is a Grand Prix motorcycle racer from Italy.

== Career statistics ==
=== By season ===
Season	Class	Motorcycle	Team	Number	Race	Win	Podium	Pole	FLap	Pts	Plcd
2006	125cc	Honda	Humangest Racing Team	56	1	0	0	0	0	0	NC
Total					1	0	0	0	0	0	

=== Races by year ===
(key)

Year	Class	Bike	1	2	3	4	5	6	7	8	9	10	11	12	13	14	15	16	Pos.	Pts
2006	125cc	Honda	SPA	QAT	TUR	CHN	FRA	ITA	CAT	NED	GBR	GER	CZE; 33	MAL	AUS	JPN	POR	VAL	NC	0
