= Kazuya Otani =

Japanese motorcycle racer

- Nationality: Japanese
- Born: 16 April 1989 (age 37); Osaka, Japan

Kazuya Otani is a Grand Prix motorcycle racer from Japan.

== Career statistics ==
=== By season ===
Season	Class	Motorcycle	Team	Race	Win	Podium	Pole	FLap	Pts	Plcd
2006	125cc	Malaguti	Malaguti Ajo Corse	2	0	0	0	0	0	NC
Total				2	0	0	0	0	0	

=== Races by year ===
(key)

Year	Class	Bike	1	2	3	4	5	6	7	8	9	10	11	12	13	14	15	16	Pos.	Pts
2006	125cc	Malaguti	SPA	QAT	TUR	CHN	FRA	ITA	CAT	NED	GBR	GER	CZE	MAL	AUS	JPN; Ret	POR; 28	VAL	NC	0
