= Meik Kevin Minnerop =

German motorcycle racer

- Nationality: German
- Born: 17 January 1990 (age 36); Siegen, Germany

Meik Kevin Minnerop (born 17 January 1990) is a Grand Prix motorcycle racer from Germany.
