= Luke Lawrence (motorcyclist) =

British motorcycle racer

- Nationality: British
- Born: London, England

Luke Lawrence is a Grand Prix motorcycle racer from the United Kingdom.

At the opening round of the 2006 National MRO 250cc Grand Prix championship at Brands Hatch, Lawrence, who was based in Sudbury, Suffolk at the time, qualified on pole position, won three races and set the fastest lap time. Following the opening round of New Era Superclub championship at Snetterton, he also led those championship standings (with a victory in the wet starting from pit lane). He went on to score points in the opening European Championship 250cc Grand Prix races and was then ceded for a Wildcard at the 2006 British Grand Prix at Donington Park.

Lawrence has ridden in a total of five Grand Prix events, three in the 2006 Grand Prix motorcycle racing season (Donington, Brno and Estoril) and a further two wildcards at Grands Prix in 2007 - The British Grand Prix (Donington Park) on board the C&L Racing Honda (Entered as TNT Express Team FILA) and the Portuguese Grand Prix (Estoril) on board the Team MAS Aprilia (Entered by employer and sponsor Team McDonald's)

In 2007, Lawrence paid to ride an Aprilia with Team MAS in the European 250cc Grand Prix Championship. He had a late start to the season after signing over the winter to ride for Winona WCM, who have been unable to race this season following the withdrawal of the team's principal sponsor. Lawrence rode for C&L Racing at two events before signing to ride with Team MAS under the support of McDonald's Corporation and the 'Not bad for a McJob' campaign.

Lawrence was unable to continue with Team MAS in 2008 due to a lack of funding, but was offered a ride on a Kawasaki ZX10 in the CEV Spanish Superbike Championship (Formula Extreme) but due to funding problems unfortunately had to withdraw from the series midway through the season.

Lawrence returned to race in the UK for 2009 in the one make Triumph Triple Challenge with two class podiums and also entered several rounds of the Toyota Sprint Series - a UK-based Toyota only car sprint championship taking third in Class at his initial outing at Rockingham.

== Career statistics ==
=== By season ===
Season	Class	Motorcycle	Team	Number	Race	Win	Podium	Pole	FLap	Pts	Plcd
2006	250cc	Yamaha	BM Groundworks	75	2	0	0	0	0	0	NC
2007	250cc	Honda	TNT Express Team Fila	84	0	0	0	0	0	0	NC
2007	250cc	Aprilia	Team McDonald's	84	0	0	0	0	0	0	NC
Total					2	0	0	0	0	0	

=== Races by year ===
Year	Class	Bike	1	2	3	4	5	6	7	8	9	10	11	12	13	14	15	16	17	Pos	Points
2006	250cc	Yamaha	SPA	QAT	TUR	CHN	FRA	ITA	CAT	NED	GBR; Ret	GER	CZE; DNQ	MAL	AUS	JPN	POR; 23	VAL		NC	0
2007	250cc	Honda	QAT	SPA	TUR	CHN	FRA	ITA	CAT	GBR; DNQ										NC	0
2007	250cc	Aprilia									NED	GER	CZE	RSM	POR; DNQ	JPN	AUS	MAL	VAL	NC	0
