= 2003 Pacific motorcycle Grand Prix =

(Tochigi Prefecture) 2003 Pacific Grand Prix
Race details
- Race 13 of 16 races in the 2003 Grand Prix motorcycle racing season
- Date: 5 October 2003
- Official name: Gauloises Pacific Grand Prix of Motegi
- Location: Twin Ring Motegi
- Course: Permanent racing facility; 4.801 km (2.983 mi)

MotoGP
Pole position
Rider	(Italy) Max Biaggi	Honda
Time	1:47.696	
Fastest lap
Rider	(Italy) Valentino Rossi	Honda
Time	1:48.885 on lap 16	
Podium
First	(Italy) Max Biaggi	Honda
Second	(Italy) Valentino Rossi	Honda
Third	(United States) Nicky Hayden	Honda

250cc
Pole position
Rider	(Spain) Toni Elías	Aprilia
Time	1:52.849	
Fastest lap
Rider	(Spain) Toni Elías	Aprilia
Time	1:53.612 on lap 6	
Podium
First	(Spain) Toni Elías	Aprilia
Second	(Italy) Roberto Rolfo	Honda
Third	(San Marino) Manuel Poggiali	Aprilia

125cc
Pole position
Rider	(Spain) Daniel Pedrosa	Honda
Time	1:57.736	
Fastest lap
Rider	(Spain) Jorge Lorenzo	Derbi
Time	1:58.545 on lap 8	
Podium
First	(Spain) Héctor Barberá	Aprilia
Second	(Australia) Casey Stoner	Aprilia
Third	(Italy) Andrea Dovizioso	Honda

The 2003 Pacific motorcycle Grand Prix was the thirteenth round of the 2003 MotoGP Championship. It took place on the weekend of 3–5 October 2003 at the Twin Ring Motegi circuit.

== MotoGP classification ==
Pos.	No.	Rider	Team	Manufacturer	Laps	Time/Retired	Grid	Points
1	3	(Italy) Max Biaggi	Camel Pramac Pons	Honda	24	43:57.590	1	25
2	46	(Italy) Valentino Rossi	Repsol Honda	Honda	24	+3.754	3	20
3	69	(United States) Nicky Hayden	Repsol Honda	Honda	24	+5.641	5	16
4	15	(Spain) Sete Gibernau	Telefónica Movistar Honda	Honda	24	+19.456	4	13
5	33	(Italy) Marco Melandri	Fortuna Yamaha Team	Yamaha	24	+19.909	9	11
6	4	(Brazil) Alex Barros	Gauloises Yamaha Team	Yamaha	24	+20.938	8	10
7	11	(Japan) Tohru Ukawa	Camel Pramac Pons	Honda	24	+22.307	11	9
8	65	(Italy) Loris Capirossi	Ducati Marlboro Team	Ducati	24	+27.887	6	8
9	56	(Japan) Shinya Nakano	d'antin Yamaha Team	Yamaha	24	+41.731	12	7
10	43	(Japan) Akira Ryō	Team Suzuki	Suzuki	24	+50.106	14	6
11	23	(Japan) Ryuichi Kiyonari	Telefónica Movistar Honda	Honda	24	+53.214	20	5
12	41	(Japan) Noriyuki Haga	Alice Aprilia Racing	Aprilia	24	+53.589	25	4
13	19	(France) Olivier Jacque	Gauloises Yamaha Team	Yamaha	24	+1:05.620	15	3
14	9	(Japan) Nobuatsu Aoki	Proton Team KR	Proton KR	24	+1:07.535	18	2
15	10	(United States) Kenny Roberts Jr.	Suzuki Grand Prix Team	Suzuki	24	+1:09.055	19	1
16	88	(Australia) Andrew Pitt	Kawasaki Racing Team	Kawasaki	24	+1:11.533	22	
17	45	(United States) Colin Edwards	Alice Aprilia Racing	Aprilia	24	+1:27.583	13	
18	25	(Japan) Tamaki Serizawa	Moriwaki Racing	Moriwaki	24	+1:33.001	23	
19	52	(Spain) José David de Gea	WCM	Harris WCM	23	+1 lap	24	
Ret	8	(Australia) Garry McCoy	Kawasaki Racing Team	Kawasaki	10	Retirement	21	
Ret	99	(United Kingdom) Jeremy McWilliams	Proton Team KR	Proton KR	2	Accident	17	
Ret	35	(United Kingdom) Chris Burns	WCM	Harris WCM	1	Retirement	26	
Ret	12	(Australia) Troy Bayliss	Ducati Marlboro Team	Ducati	0	Accident	10	
Ret	21	(United States) John Hopkins	Suzuki Grand Prix Team	Suzuki	0	Accident	16	
Ret	7	(Spain) Carlos Checa	Fortuna Yamaha Team	Yamaha	0	Accident	7	
DSQ	6	(Japan) Makoto Tamada	Pramac Honda	Honda	24	(+4.864) (Note: Disqualified for riding in an irresponsible manner.)	2	

== 250 cc classification ==
Pos.	No.	Rider	Manufacturer	Laps	Time/Retired	Grid	Points
1	24	(Spain) Toni Elías	Aprilia	23	43:57.125	1	25
2	3	(Italy) Roberto Rolfo	Honda	23	+1.483	11	20
3	54	(San Marino) Manuel Poggiali	Aprilia	23	+2.159	7	16
4	55	(Japan) Yuki Takahashi	Honda	23	+6.018	10	13
5	92	(Japan) Hiroshi Aoyama	Honda	23	+6.163	6	11
6	7	(France) Randy de Puniet	Aprilia	23	+20.407	3	10
7	8	(Japan) Naoki Matsudo	Yamaha	23	+25.938	8	9
8	10	(Spain) Fonsi Nieto	Aprilia	23	+28.417	15	8
9	6	(Spain) Alex Debón	Honda	23	+39.804	13	7
10	70	(Japan) Choujun Kameya	Honda	23	+39.919	14	6
11	57	(United Kingdom) Chaz Davies	Aprilia	23	+49.703	12	5
12	15	(Germany) Christian Gemmel	Honda	23	+55.921	18	4
13	26	(Italy) Alex Baldolini	Aprilia	23	+1:01.015	22	3
14	28	(Germany) Dirk Heidolf	Aprilia	23	+1:03.387	24	2
15	69	(Japan) Masaki Tokudome	Yamaha	23	+1:03.530	20	1
16	9	(France) Hugo Marchand	Aprilia	23	+1:04.299	19	
17	36	(France) Erwan Nigon	Aprilia	23	+1:04.621	16	
18	96	(Czech Republic) Jakub Smrž	Honda	23	+1:21.680	26	
19	11	(Spain) Joan Olivé	Aprilia	23	+1:44.192	28	
20	18	(Netherlands) Henk vd Lagemaat	Honda	22	+1 lap	30	
Ret	5	(Argentina) Sebastián Porto	Honda	18	Accident	4	
Ret	67	(Japan) Tomoyoshi Koyama	Yamaha	11	Retirement	9	
Ret	50	(France) Sylvain Guintoli	Aprilia	9	Accident	5	
Ret	13	(Czech Republic) Jaroslav Huleš	Honda	9	Retirement	29	
Ret	14	(Australia) Anthony West	Aprilia	8	Retirement	23	
Ret	34	(France) Eric Bataille	Honda	6	Retirement	21	
Ret	33	(Spain) Héctor Faubel	Aprilia	5	Retirement	17	
Ret	16	(Sweden) Johan Stigefelt	Aprilia	3	Retirement	27	
Ret	21	(Italy) Franco Battaini	Aprilia	2	Accident	2	
Ret	52	(Czech Republic) Lukáš Pešek	Yamaha	1	Retirement	25	

== 125 cc classification ==
Pos.	No.	Rider	Manufacturer	Laps	Time/Retired	Grid	Points
1	80	(Spain) Héctor Barberá	Aprilia	21	41:54.483	4	25
2	27	(Australia) Casey Stoner	Aprilia	21	+0.164	10	20
3	34	(Italy) Andrea Dovizioso	Honda	21	+0.304	5	16
4	7	(Italy) Stefano Perugini	Aprilia	21	+2.731	2	13
5	17	(Germany) Steve Jenkner	Aprilia	21	+2.970	16	11
6	3	(Spain) Daniel Pedrosa	Honda	21	+3.215	1	10
7	36	(Finland) Mika Kallio	KTM	21	+3.264	13	9
8	22	(Spain) Pablo Nieto	Aprilia	21	+9.200	6	8
9	15	(San Marino) Alex de Angelis	Aprilia	21	+13.016	8	7
10	12	(Switzerland) Thomas Lüthi	Honda	21	+13.195	15	6
11	6	(Italy) Mirko Giansanti	Aprilia	21	+13.353	19	5
12	19	(Spain) Álvaro Bautista	Aprilia	21	+19.848	18	4
13	8	(Japan) Masao Azuma	Honda	21	+20.107	21	3
14	79	(Hungary) Gábor Talmácsi	Aprilia	21	+20.616	12	2
15	24	(Italy) Simone Corsi	Honda	21	+23.402	17	1
16	33	(Italy) Stefano Bianco	Gilera	21	+24.840	9	
17	41	(Japan) Youichi Ui	Gilera	21	+30.548	24	
18	32	(Italy) Fabrizio Lai	Malaguti	21	+47.008	23	
19	1	(France) Arnaud Vincent	Aprilia	21	+52.431	22	
20	50	(Italy) Andrea Ballerini	Honda	21	+52.675	30	
21	66	(Japan) Shuhei Aoyama	Honda	21	+57.467	29	
22	88	(Denmark) Robbin Harms	Aprilia	21	+1:11.694	33	
23	59	(Japan) Hiroaki Kuzuhara	Honda	21	+1:11.770	36	
24	31	(Spain) Julián Simón	Malaguti	21	+1:13.195	25	
25	94	(Japan) Sadahito Suma	Honda	21	+1:16.576	31	
26	25	(Hungary) Imre Tóth	Honda	21	+1:28.964	32	
Ret	10	(Italy) Roberto Locatelli	KTM	20	Retirement	20	
Ret	48	(Spain) Jorge Lorenzo	Derbi	19	Accident	3	
Ret	23	(Italy) Gino Borsoi	Aprilia	14	Accident	11	
Ret	58	(Italy) Marco Simoncelli	Aprilia	14	Retirement	14	
Ret	95	(Japan) Yuki Hatano	Honda	12	Accident	37	
Ret	63	(France) Mike Di Meglio	Honda	7	Accident	26	
Ret	4	(Italy) Lucio Cecchinello	Aprilia	5	Accident	7	
Ret	28	(Italy) Michele Danese	Honda	5	Retirement	38	
Ret	65	(Japan) Toshihisa Kuzuhara	Honda	4	Retirement	27	
Ret	11	(Italy) Max Sabbatani	Aprilia	4	Retirement	35	
Ret	26	(Spain) Emilio Alzamora	Derbi	3	Accident	28	
Ret	42	(Italy) Gioele Pellino	Aprilia	3	Accident	34	

== Championship standings after the race (MotoGP) ==
Below are the standings for the top five riders and constructors after round thirteen has concluded.

Riders' Championship standings

Pos.	Rider	Points
1	(Italy) Valentino Rossi	282
2	(Spain) Sete Gibernau	224
3	(Italy) Max Biaggi	199
4	(Italy) Loris Capirossi	131
5	(Australia) Troy Bayliss	112

Constructors' Championship standings

Pos.	Constructor	Points
1	(Japan) Honda	320
2	(Italy) Ducati	179
3	(Japan) Yamaha	143
4	(Italy) Aprilia	67
5	(Japan) Suzuki	29

- Note: Only the top five positions are included for both sets of standings.

== Notes ==
Previous race: 2003 Rio de Janeiro Grand Prix	FIM Grand Prix World Championship; 2003 season	Next race: 2003 Malaysian Grand Prix
Previous race: 2002 Pacific Grand Prix	Pacific motorcycle Grand Prix	Next race: None
