= 2003 Dutch TT =

(Netherlands) 2003 Dutch Grand Prix
Race details
- Race 7 of 16 races in the 2003 Grand Prix motorcycle racing season
- Date: 28 June 2003
- Official name: Gauloises Dutch TT
- Location: TT Circuit Assen
- Course: Permanent racing facility; 6.027 km (3.745 mi)

MotoGP
Pole position
Rider	(Italy) Loris Capirossi	Ducati
Time	1:59.770	
Fastest lap
Rider	(Spain) Sete Gibernau	Honda
Time	2:11.805 on lap 15	
Podium
First	(Spain) Sete Gibernau	Honda
Second	(Italy) Max Biaggi	Honda
Third	(Italy) Valentino Rossi	Honda

250cc
Pole position
Rider	(San Marino) Manuel Poggiali	Aprilia
Time	2:04.050	
Fastest lap
Rider	(Italy) Franco Battaini	Aprilia
Time	2:16.926 on lap 15	
Podium
First	(Australia) Anthony West	Aprilia
Second	(Italy) Franco Battaini	Aprilia
Third	(France) Sylvain Guintoli	Aprilia

125cc
Pole position
Rider	(Spain) Daniel Pedrosa	Honda
Time	2:10.724	
Fastest lap
Rider	(Spain) Héctor Barberá	Aprilia
Time	2:26.247 on lap 7	
Podium
First	(Germany) Steve Jenkner	Aprilia
Second	(Spain) Pablo Nieto	Aprilia
Third	(Spain) Héctor Barberá	Aprilia

The 2003 Dutch TT was the seventh round of the 2003 MotoGP Championship. It took place on the weekend of 26–28 June 2003 at the TT Circuit Assen located in Assen, Netherlands.

== MotoGP race report ==
This race was most notable for the drama that went on before the start of the race, the extremely wet weather conditions the race was held in, Loris Capirossi's initial start from the pit lane despite starting from pole position and Sete Gibernau's battle with Max Biaggi for the victory.

After six rounds, Valentino Rossi still leads the title hunt with 135 points. Behind him in relative distance is Sete Gibernau with 88 and Max Biaggi with 85 points.

Before the start, there was drama as polesitter Loris Capirossi might have to start from the pitlane. He set a time of 1:59.770 but was still in the pit lane minutes before the start. Second on the grid is Max Biaggi, third is Valentino Rossi and fourth Carlos Checa. Completing the second row of the grid is fifth place Olivier Jacque, sixth place Alex Barros, seventh place Sete Gibernau and eighth place Marco Melandri. Kenny Roberts Jr. did not participate in the race due to a crash at the Italian race where he sustained tissue damage and had to miss both the Catalan and current round. Replacing him is Suzuki test rider Yukio Kagayama

There was further confusion as the race was initially classified as wet, but during the official sighting lap by the safety car, officials declared the track to be dry enough to start with slick tyres, thus declaring it a dry race minutes before the start. As all the riders did their usual sighting lap, it started to rain again and Rossi put his arm up in the air to signal that he did not want to start this way. As an act of defiance, he went into the pits and urged everyone to do likewise, following him to switch bikes on grounds of safety reasons. Mechanics quickly change the tyres on the bikes to put on the full wets, delaying the start.

As all the riders and mechanics were still preparing, the new race start was pushed back to 15:50 with the pit lane reopening at 15:40 for a total of five minutes. The officials declared that the race distance still remains 19 laps, which is the original race distance.

During the opening of the pit lane, some take off and do a sighting lap. Officials declared that they are allowed to do one sighting lap, followed by a grid formation and one warm-up before the start. During the sighting lap, one of the riders - Nobuatsu Aoki - got stuck in the gravel and couldn't get out.

After a relative period of waiting, all the riders line up on a now rain soaked grid and begin the warm-up lap. Because of the reshuffle and delayed start, Capirossi will start in pole position as usual. Aoki however does have to start from the pits because he could not make the start in time. The same thing happened to Aoki's teammate Jeremy McWilliams, meaning that both will have to start from the back of the grid.

All riders slowly slot into their respective grid positions and as the lights go out, it is Rossi who has the best start and moves up into the lead at the S-Bocht (Turn 1), followed by Biaggi in second and Gibernau in third, moving up from seventh and taking multiple positions by going on the right side of the circuit. Barros makes up multiple positions from the second row and moves up into fourth, also benefiting from Capirossi's appalling start which dropped him way back into the field after he failed to get away properly. Jacque, who initially looked to have a bad start, managed to get away well and overtakes multiple people before going up the inside of teammate Barros at the Haarbocht (Turn 2) for fourth position. Also at the Haarbocht, Gibernau surprises both Rossi and Biaggi by lunging up their insides and taking over the lead of the race after just two corners, with Biaggi also snatching second from Rossi in the process. The young Italian now had lost two positions in one corner on the opening lap. The duo then opens up a slight gap back to Rossi. At the straight before the medium speed unnamed right hander before Strubben, a charging Troy Bayliss goes up the inside of Barros and takes fifth place from him. At the Ruskenhoek (Turn 8), Jacque closes up on Rossi and Jacque looks to make a move on 'The Doctor' at the Stekkenwal (Turn 9) but decides to stay behind for the time being. Jacque then takes third from Rossi, almost immediately followed by Bayliss who goes up his inside at the fast Meeuwenmeer corner (Turn 13) for fourth position, relegating Rossi from third to fifth in just a few corners. However, just before the entrance of the Geert Timmer Bocht (Turn 16), he makes a late lunge and dives up the inside of Bayliss to take back fourth place in the process.

On lap two, Barros is now close to Bayliss at the S-Bocht but does not yet make a move. At the Ossebroeken (Turn 4), Biaggi makes his move and takes the lead from Gibernau by passing him via the inside, with Rossi trying to catch Jacque in the meantime. At the Stekkenwal, Barros tries to dive down the inside of Bayliss but fails and has to stay behind for the time being. Behind barros is rookie Colin Edwards on the Alice Aprilia in seventh place. At the Geert Timmer Bocht, Rossi outbrakes Jacque and passes him entering the right-left-right hander to take third place. Exiting the corner, Jacque has a slight wobble which allows Bayliss to get close to him and pass him for fourth at the start/finish straight.

Lap three and Biaggi now sets the fastest lap of the race. Barros also passes his teammate and takes fifth position. The top six now consists as follows: Biaggi, Gibernau, Rossi, Bayliss, Barros and Jacque. Edwards is now also closing the gap on sixth place Jacque. Gibernau's gap back to Rossi is +1.239 seconds in sector one, increasing to +1.364 seconds in sector two. At the short, unnamed right-hand kink before De Bult (Turn 10), Gibernau goes alongside Biaggi and passes him for the lead. However, exiting De Bult, Gibernau has a slight wobble and loses the place back to Biaggi. Jacque has also repassed Barros earlier on for fifth.

On lap four, Gibernau goes again side-by-side with Biaggi on the start/finish straight, forcing the Italian to go onto the grass almost and back off slightly at the S-Bocht, aggressively taking over the lead once more. Gibernau also sets the fastest lap, only for that honour to fall to Noriyuki Haga down in eighth place. A bit further behind, Rossi is now under pressure from Bayliss in fourth, Jacque is riding away from teammate Barros, who himself is now coming under pressure from Edwards. Rossi is starting to open up a slight gap back to Bayliss.

Lap five and Gibernau now sets the fastest lap again. Bayliss closes the small gap right back up at the Haarbocht and overtakes Rossi at the outside of the corner, promoting him to third. At the Ramshoek and Geert Timmer Bocht corners, Rossi gets closer to Bayliss but isn't able to quite make a move and even has a slight moment exiting the corner sequence.

On lap six, Bayliss crashes out of contention. He tries to pull his bike back up as the marshalls speed towards him to help him, the Australian urging them to push start his bike. He gets going again eventually but has to start all the way back in a lowly sixteenth after losing many places. This promotes all the midfield runners (Jacque, Barros, Edwards and Haga) up by one place. Gibernau is now opening up a small gap to Biaggi in second place.

Lap seven and the top two now have a big gap back to third place Rossi. The gap Biaggi has to Rossi is +5.021 seconds in sector one, decreasing slightly to +4.939 seconds in sector two.

On lap eight, Biaggi now sets the fastest lap. Haga now overtakes teammate Edwards at the S-Bocht for fifth place. Exiting Duikersloot (Turn 12), Gibernau has a slight moment but does not lose any time or places. Checa now goes up the inside of Barros at Mandeven (Turn 11) for seventh place.

Lap nine and Gibernau has set the fastest lap of the race. The top six is as follows: Gibernau, Biaggi, Rossi, Jacque, Haga and Edwards. During this lap, Biaggi closes the small gap to Gibernau and starts to put pressure on the Spaniard.

On lap ten - the halfway point of the race - and Gibernau is still leading the race. His gap back to Biaggi is +0.895 seconds at the start/finish straight but closes again significantly in sector one. By now, the top two start encounter some backmarkers, most notably Aoki and Garry McCoy. McCoy lets Gibernau through with relative ease, but blocks Biaggi significantly in the middle of the Geert Timmer Bocht, causing him to lose valuable time and touch with the Spaniard.

Lap eleven and Biaggi now has it all to do to fix the small gap created by backmarker McCoy. This has opened up a +0.912 second gap back to Biaggi for Gibernau. McWilliams has crashed out of the race and is ignoring the marshalls who are more concerned with removing his bike from the gravel.

On lap twelve, Gibernau sets another fastest lap and extends the gap he has to Biaggi. Third place Rossi is also trying to pass some backmarkers but is forced to go onto the slippery exit chicane at the Geert Timmer Bocht while trying to pass Makoto Tamada.

Lap thirteen and Aoki has also gone down, the marshalls pushing his bike away from the circuit. He lost the front at De Bult and almost hits Barros as he rolls onto the circuit, who can narrowly avoid him and slow down.

On lap fourteen, Gibernau now has to overtake the other Kawasaki backmarker in the form of Andrew Pitt, whom he overtakes without any problems. Checa is now rapidly closing in on Jacque exiting the Ramshoek and makes his move at the entrance of the Geert Timmer Bocht, passing Jacque for fifth position on the inside of him.

Lap fifteen and the gap Gibernau has to Biaggi is now +6.743 seconds. By now, a small dry line is starting to form as the rain has eased, if not stopped completely.

On lap sixteen, Gibernau is still in the lead. Exiting De Bult, Rossi has a slight moment on the exit of the corner but easily manages to stay on the bike. Melandri has entered the pits and retires from the race. Kagayama has also crashed out of the race, the Suzuki test rider walks away unhurt in disappointment.

Lap seventeen and Gibernau is still leading without any problems. The gap Biaggi has to Rossi is now +4.954 seconds. The circuit has now dried up significantly. Haga is now starting to struggle significantly, having a moment exiting the Strekkenwal (Turn 9) and allowing Checa to close up at a rapid pace. Jacque behind also has a bit of a moment.

On lap eighteen and Haga is still ahead of Checa who wants to find a way past. Behind them, Capirossi is also trying to overtake Jacque for sixth spot. Gibernau's gap to Biaggi is now +9.733 seconds.

Lap nineteen, the penultimate lap, has begun and Haga has crashed out of the race, highsiding over a puddle and failing to keep it after Checa had already passed him. Confused and disappointed he stands up and looks at his wrecked bike in the dirt and grass, knowing that his race is finished.

The final lap - lap twenty - has begun and Gibernau still has a massive lead over the competition. Biaggi is still second and Rossi still third. There were no troubles for the Telefónica Movistar Honda rider, who cruises home, even checking behind him to see if no one is there and then standing up as he crosses the line and win the race - his third win of the season. A bit further behind is Biaggi who comes home second, Possibly has Beaten Rossi. Rossi himself however crosses the line third with a big wheelie, as he's still leading the championship. In fourth comes home a satisfied Checa, in fifth Jacque and in sixth Capirossi.

On the parade lap back to parc-fermé, Gibernau celebrated by putting his finger in the air, then tries to stand up on his bike again. He also waves at the crowd and makes kissing gestures at the audience. He then stands up on his bike once more and fistpumps the air. Biaggi celebrates likewise, waving at the audience and being complimented by the marshalls. Rossi however, straight up does multiple wheelies to celebrate instead. Gibernau then stops to do a burnout in front of the fans, much to their and the nearby marshalls approval. The track gets invaded by some of Gibernau's fans, who surround him and give him the Spanish flag, to which he continues his way shortly after, waving the flag with pride. He continues his festivities with the crowd cheering him on. The other two men, Biaggi and Rossi, now slowly make their way back to parc-fermé as the marshals greet them on. On the way back, Rossi runs out of fuel and then tries to push his bike by foot.

Back at the garage already is Capirossi, who is talking to his team about the race. Biaggi is the first to arrive at parc-ferme, the 'Roman Emperor' shaking hands with some of the Repsol Honda mechanics, then with some of his own Camel Pramac Pons crewmembers. Gibernau is still on his way, celebrating and saluting the fans in glee. Fireworks are now being lit on some parts of the track, causing parts to be badly visible due to smoke. When arriving at parc-fermé, he gets greeted by his Telefónica Movistar Honda crew and steps off his bike to go and greet Sito Pons, then members of his own team. The last one to arrive is Rossi, who calmly stays on the bike and takes off his gloves and helmet.

The trio now make their way onto the podium, with Valentino Rossi the first to arrive under a loud cheering from the crowd. Next up is a delighted Biaggi in second and in the end Gibernau comes up with the crowd valiantly cheering as he happily appears. He gives Rossi and Biaggi a hand and then steps onto the top step, holding up his helmet in joy before putting it down. Circuit owner Jos Vaessen hands Rossi the third place trophy, the Italian waving happily at the crowd while holding up his trophy. He does likewise to Biaggi who also happily holds up his trophy. Jean-Pierre Aujoulet, the then Sponsoring Manager at Gauloises, hands Gibernau the trophy, which he happily accepts, kisses and then slowly holds up for all to see. The Spanish national anthem plays for Gibernau and the crowd applauds once it stops, shouting "Sete! Sete!" as well. The trio then receives the champagne and Gibernau immediately starts to spray the audience, with Rossi cheekily spraying one of the podium girls instead. Rossi - now wearing glasses - then sprays it at the crowd as well as on Gibernau, who does likewise. Biaggi also sprays the crowd before drinking some of it. The riders, except for Rossi, then put the champagne down as they all pose for a photo moment together.

Gibernau's win now means he closes the gap to Rossi in the title hunt, albeit slowly. Biaggi's second place also keeps him alive and Rossi's third place solidifies his championship lead. Rossi now has 151 points, Gibernau 113 and Biaggi 105 points.

== MotoGP classification ==
Pos.	No.	Rider	Team	Manufacturer	Laps	Time/Retired	Grid	Points
1	15	(Spain) Sete Gibernau	Telefónica Movistar Honda	Honda	19	42:39.006	7	25
2	3	(Italy) Max Biaggi	Camel Pramac Pons	Honda	19	+10.111	2	20
3	46	(Italy) Valentino Rossi	Repsol Honda	Honda	19	+13.875	3	16
4	7	(Spain) Carlos Checa	Fortuna Yamaha Team	Yamaha	19	+36.978	4	13
5	19	(France) Olivier Jacque	Gauloises Yamaha Team	Yamaha	19	+40.345	5	11
6	65	(Italy) Loris Capirossi	Ducati Marlboro Team	Ducati	19	+42.177	1	10
7	45	(United States) Colin Edwards	Alice Aprilia Racing	Aprilia	19	+50.518	9	9
8	4	(Brazil) Alex Barros	Gauloises Yamaha Team	Yamaha	19	+59.023	6	8
9	12	(Australia) Troy Bayliss	Ducati Marlboro Team	Ducati	19	+1:33.536	13	7
10	66	(Germany) Alex Hofmann	Kawasaki Racing Team	Kawasaki	19	+1:36.403	17	6
11	69	(United States) Nicky Hayden	Repsol Honda	Honda	19	+1:39.033	12	5
12	11	(Japan) Tohru Ukawa	Camel Pramac Pons	Honda	19	+1:42.398	11	4
13	56	(Japan) Shinya Nakano	d'Antín Yamaha Team	Yamaha	19	+1:43.690	10	3
14	88	(Australia) Andrew Pitt	Kawasaki Racing Team	Kawasaki	18	+1 lap	20	2
15	21	(United States) John Hopkins	Suzuki Grand Prix Team	Suzuki	18	+1 lap	16	1
16	6	(Japan) Makoto Tamada	Pramac Honda	Honda	18	+1 lap	18	
17	23	(Japan) Ryuichi Kiyonari	Telefónica Movistar Honda	Honda	18	+1 lap	22	
18	8	(Australia) Garry McCoy	Kawasaki Racing Team	Kawasaki	18	+1 lap	21	
Ret	41	(Japan) Noriyuki Haga	Alice Aprilia Racing	Aprilia	17	Accident	14	
Ret	71	(Japan) Yukio Kagayama	Suzuki Grand Prix Team	Suzuki	14	Accident	15	
Ret	33	(Italy) Marco Melandri	Fortuna Yamaha Team	Yamaha	14	Retirement	8	
Ret	9	(Japan) Nobuatsu Aoki	Proton Team KR	Proton KR	10	Accident	23	
Ret	99	(United Kingdom) Jeremy McWilliams	Proton Team KR	Proton KR	9	Accident	19	

== 250 cc classification ==
Pos.	No.	Rider	Manufacturer	Laps	Time/Retired	Grid	Points
1	14	(Australia) Anthony West	Aprilia	18	41:57.413	9	25
2	21	(Italy) Franco Battaini	Aprilia	18	+2.987	7	20
3	50	(France) Sylvain Guintoli	Aprilia	18	+10.661	6	16
4	54	(San Marino) Manuel Poggiali	Aprilia	18	+14.160	1	13
5	5	(Argentina) Sebastián Porto	Honda	18	+26.617	5	11
6	3	(Italy) Roberto Rolfo	Honda	18	+31.948	8	10
7	36	(France) Erwan Nigon	Aprilia	18	+1:14.197	12	9
8	15	(Germany) Christian Gemmel	Honda	18	+1:24.658	20	8
9	9	(France) Hugo Marchand	Aprilia	18	+1:36.159	17	7
10	16	(Sweden) Johan Stigefelt	Aprilia	18	+1:36.270	16	6
11	6	(Spain) Alex Debón	Honda	18	+1:56.249	18	5
12	96	(Czech Republic) Jakub Smrž	Honda	18	+1:56.979	21	4
13	24	(Spain) Toni Elías	Aprilia	18	+2:03.227	3	3
14	26	(Italy) Alex Baldolini	Aprilia	18	+2:03.521	22	2
15	30	(Germany) Klaus Nöhles	Aprilia	17	+1 lap	14	1
16	18	(Netherlands) Henk vd Lagemaat	Honda	17	+1 lap	24	
17	33	(Spain) Héctor Faubel	Aprilia	17	+1 lap	15	
18	98	(Germany) Katja Poensgen	Honda	17	+1 lap	28	
19	46	(Netherlands) Jan Blok	Honda	17	+1 lap	27	
20	29	(Italy) Christian Pistoni	Yamaha	17	+1 lap	25	
21	47	(Netherlands) Arie Vos	Yamaha	17	+1 lap	23	
22	48	(Netherlands) Hans Smees	Honda	17	+1 lap	26	
23	11	(Spain) Joan Olivé	Aprilia	16	+2 laps	13	
24	57	(United Kingdom) Chaz Davies	Aprilia	16	+2 laps	19	
Ret	10	(Spain) Fonsi Nieto	Aprilia	6	Chain	4	
Ret	8	(Japan) Naoki Matsudo	Yamaha	4	Accident	10	
Ret	7	(France) Randy de Puniet	Aprilia	1	Accident	2	
Ret	34	(France) Eric Bataille	Honda	0	Accident	11	
DNQ	49	(Netherlands) Randy Gevers	Honda		Did not qualify		

== 125 cc classification ==
Pos.	No.	Rider	Manufacturer	Laps	Time/Retired	Grid	Points
1	17	(Germany) Steve Jenkner	Aprilia	17	42:25.609	3	25
2	22	(Spain) Pablo Nieto	Aprilia	17	+11.189	11	20
3	80	(Spain) Héctor Barberá	Aprilia	17	+24.683	9	16
4	41	(Japan) Youichi Ui	Aprilia	17	+30.420	7	13
5	7	(Italy) Stefano Perugini	Aprilia	17	+46.439	4	11
6	15	(San Marino) Alex de Angelis	Aprilia	17	+1:01.726	2	10
7	12	(Switzerland) Thomas Lüthi	Honda	17	+1:01.855	5	9
8	3	(Spain) Daniel Pedrosa	Honda	17	+1:04.598	1	8
9	79	(Hungary) Gábor Talmácsi	Aprilia	17	+1:05.176	17	7
10	34	(Italy) Andrea Dovizioso	Honda	17	+1:06.020	16	6
11	36	(Finland) Mika Kallio	Honda	17	+1:06.075	10	5
12	24	(Italy) Simone Corsi	Honda	17	+1:06.419	18	4
13	23	(Italy) Gino Borsoi	Aprilia	17	+1:06.874	13	3
14	32	(Italy) Fabrizio Lai	Malaguti	17	+1:08.301	14	2
15	6	(Italy) Mirko Giansanti	Aprilia	17	+1:08.303	19	1
16	4	(Italy) Lucio Cecchinello	Aprilia	17	+1:18.978	12	
17	31	(Spain) Julián Simón	Malaguti	17	+1:45.750	29	
18	75	(Netherlands) Adri den Bekker	Honda	17	+1:51.673	36	
19	63	(France) Mike Di Meglio	Aprilia	17	+1:52.001	25	
20	58	(Italy) Marco Simoncelli	Aprilia	17	+2:05.902	15	
21	26	(Spain) Emilio Alzamora	Derbi	17	+2:07.510	32	
22	11	(Italy) Max Sabbatani	Aprilia	17	+2:31.939	24	
23	25	(Hungary) Imre Tóth	Honda	16	+1 lap	26	
24	76	(Netherlands) Jarno vd Marel	Honda	16	+1 lap	33	
Ret	21	(United Kingdom) Leon Camier	Honda	14	Retirement	34	
Ret	8	(Japan) Masao Azuma	Honda	12	Accident	22	
Ret	19	(Spain) Álvaro Bautista	Aprilia	10	Retirement	20	
Ret	77	(Netherlands) Raymond Schouten	Honda	10	Accident	31	
Ret	78	(Hungary) Péter Lénárt	Honda	10	Retirement	35	
Ret	48	(Spain) Jorge Lorenzo	Derbi	9	Accident	8	
Ret	10	(Italy) Roberto Locatelli	KTM	9	Retirement	30	
Ret	1	(France) Arnaud Vincent	KTM	7	Retirement	21	
Ret	89	(Netherlands) Mark van Kreij	Honda	7	Accident	37	
Ret	42	(Italy) Gioele Pellino	Aprilia	7	Retirement	28	
Ret	27	(Australia) Casey Stoner	Aprilia	2	Accident	6	
Ret	33	(Italy) Stefano Bianco	Gilera	0	Accident	27	
DSQ	88	(Denmark) Robbin Harms	Aprilia	13	Black flag	23	

== Championship standings after the race (MotoGP) ==
Below are the standings for the top five riders and constructors after round seven has concluded.

Riders' Championship standings

Pos.	Rider	Points
1	(Italy) Valentino Rossi	151
2	(Spain) Sete Gibernau	113
3	(Italy) Max Biaggi	105
4	(Italy) Loris Capirossi	71
5	(Brazil) Alex Barros	62

Constructors' Championship standings

Pos.	Constructor	Points
1	(Japan) Honda	170
2	(Italy) Ducati	100
3	(Japan) Yamaha	83
4	(Italy) Aprilia	43
5	(Malaysia) / (United States) Proton KR	21

- Note: Only the top five positions are included for both sets of standings.

Previous race: 2003 Catalan Grand Prix	FIM Grand Prix World Championship; 2003 season	Next race: 2003 British Grand Prix
Previous race: 2002 Dutch TT	Dutch TT	Next race: 2004 Dutch TT
