= Seijin Oikawa =

Japanese motorcycle racer

- Nationality: Japanese
- Born: 2 November 1970 (age 56); Kanagawa (Japan)

Seijin Oikawa (及川誠人, Oikawa Seijin) is a Grand Prix motorcycle racer from Japan.
