= 2003 Catalan motorcycle Grand Prix =

(Catalonia) 2003 Catalan Grand Prix
Race details
- Race 6 of 16 races in the 2003 Grand Prix motorcycle racing season
- Date: 15 June 2003
- Official name: Gran Premi Marlboro de Catalunya
- Location: Circuit de Catalunya
- Course: Permanent racing facility; 4.727 km (2.937 mi)

MotoGP
Pole position
Rider	(Italy) Valentino Rossi	Honda
Time	1:43.927	
Fastest lap
Rider	(Italy) Valentino Rossi	Honda
Time	1:45.472 on lap 21	
Podium
First	(Italy) Loris Capirossi	Ducati
Second	(Italy) Valentino Rossi	Honda
Third	(Spain) Sete Gibernau	Honda

250cc
Pole position
Rider	(France) Randy de Puniet	Aprilia
Time	1:47.117	
Fastest lap
Rider	(San Marino) Manuel Poggiali	Aprilia
Time	1:48.483 on lap 6	
Podium
First	(France) Randy de Puniet	Aprilia
Second	(Spain) Fonsi Nieto	Aprilia
Third	(Australia) Anthony West	Aprilia

125cc
Pole position
Rider	(Spain) Pablo Nieto	Aprilia
Time	1:51.043	
Fastest lap
Rider	(Australia) Casey Stoner	Aprilia
Time	1:51.190 on lap 4	
Podium
First	(Spain) Daniel Pedrosa	Honda
Second	(Switzerland) Thomas Lüthi	Honda
Third	(San Marino) Alex de Angelis	Aprilia

The 2003 Catalan motorcycle Grand Prix was the sixth round of the 2003 MotoGP Championship. It took place on the weekend of 13–15 June 2003 at the Circuit de Catalunya located in Montmeló, Catalonia, Spain.

== MotoGP classification ==
Pos.	No.	Rider	Team	Manufacturer	Laps	Time/Retired	Grid	Points
1	65	(Italy) Loris Capirossi	Ducati Marlboro Team	Ducati	25	44:21.758	2	25
2	46	(Italy) Valentino Rossi	Repsol Honda	Honda	25	+3.075	1	20
3	15	(Spain) Sete Gibernau	Telefónica Movistar Honda	Honda	25	+4.344	4	16
4	7	(Spain) Carlos Checa	Fortuna Yamaha Team	Yamaha	25	+4.935	8	13
5	56	(Japan) Shinya Nakano	d'Antín Yamaha Team	Yamaha	25	+5.003	6	11
6	11	(Japan) Tohru Ukawa	Camel Pramac Pons	Honda	25	+20.587	11	10
7	6	(Japan) Makoto Tamada	Pramac Honda	Honda	25	+22.982	10	9
8	4	(Brazil) Alex Barros	Gauloises Yamaha Team	Yamaha	25	+24.989	5	8
9	69	(United States) Nicky Hayden	Repsol Honda	Honda	25	+27.159	18	7
10	12	(Australia) Troy Bayliss	Ducati Marlboro Team	Ducati	25	+30.376	12	6
11	23	(Japan) Ryuichi Kiyonari	Telefónica Movistar Honda	Honda	25	+33.193	20	5
12	41	(Japan) Noriyuki Haga	Alice Aprilia Racing	Aprilia	25	+40.443	15	4
13	33	(Italy) Marco Melandri	Fortuna Yamaha Team	Yamaha	25	+40.445	14	3
14	3	(Italy) Max Biaggi	Camel Pramac Pons	Honda	25	+42.325	9	2
15	21	(United States) John Hopkins	Suzuki Grand Prix Team	Suzuki	25	+48.659	13	1
16	9	(Japan) Nobuatsu Aoki	Proton Team KR	Proton KR	25	+1:04.721	21	
17	8	(Australia) Garry McCoy	Kawasaki Racing Team	Kawasaki	25	+1:36.914	19	
Ret	19	(France) Olivier Jacque	Gauloises Yamaha Team	Yamaha	12	Accident	3	
Ret	45	(United States) Colin Edwards	Alice Aprilia Racing	Aprilia	6	Retirement	7	
Ret	48	(Japan) Akira Yanagawa	Kawasaki Racing Team	Kawasaki	0	Accident	16	
Ret	88	(Australia) Andrew Pitt	Kawasaki Racing Team	Kawasaki	0	Accident	22	
Ret	99	(United Kingdom) Jeremy McWilliams	Proton Team KR	Proton KR	0	Accident	17	

== 250 cc classification ==
Pos.	No.	Rider	Manufacturer	Laps	Time/Retired	Grid	Points
1	7	(France) Randy de Puniet	Aprilia	23	41:59.893	1	25
2	10	(Spain) Fonsi Nieto	Aprilia	23	+0.244	6	20
3	14	(Australia) Anthony West	Aprilia	23	+2.641	9	16
4	24	(Spain) Toni Elías	Aprilia	23	+4.329	3	13
5	8	(Japan) Naoki Matsudo	Yamaha	23	+7.896	7	11
6	21	(Italy) Franco Battaini	Aprilia	23	+11.432	4	10
7	5	(Argentina) Sebastián Porto	Honda	23	+11.883	5	9
8	50	(France) Sylvain Guintoli	Aprilia	23	+15.761	10	8
9	3	(Italy) Roberto Rolfo	Honda	23	+24.270	8	7
10	11	(Spain) Joan Olivé	Aprilia	23	+29.370	14	6
11	6	(Spain) Alex Debón	Honda	23	+32.091	17	5
12	30	(Germany) Klaus Nöhles	Aprilia	23	+34.948	12	4
13	16	(Sweden) Johan Stigefelt	Aprilia	23	+44.259	13	3
14	36	(France) Erwan Nigon	Aprilia	23	+46.384	15	2
15	15	(Germany) Christian Gemmel	Honda	23	+59.767	19	1
16	52	(Czech Republic) Lukáš Pešek	Yamaha	23	+1:36.297	22	
17	98	(Germany) Katja Poensgen	Honda	22	+1 lap	25	
18	18	(Netherlands) Henk vd Lagemaat	Honda	22	+1 lap	24	
Ret	96	(Czech Republic) Jakub Smrž	Honda	22	Accident	21	
Ret	54	(San Marino) Manuel Poggiali	Aprilia	12	Retirement	2	
Ret	33	(Spain) Héctor Faubel	Aprilia	10	Retirement	16	
Ret	26	(Italy) Alex Baldolini	Aprilia	10	Retirement	23	
Ret	9	(France) Hugo Marchand	Aprilia	5	Accident	11	
Ret	31	(France) Christophe Rastel	Honda	5	Retirement	26	
Ret	57	(United Kingdom) Chaz Davies	Aprilia	3	Retirement	20	
Ret	34	(France) Eric Bataille	Honda	1	Retirement	18	
DNS	40	(Spain) Álvaro Molina	Aprilia		Did not start		

== 125 cc classification ==
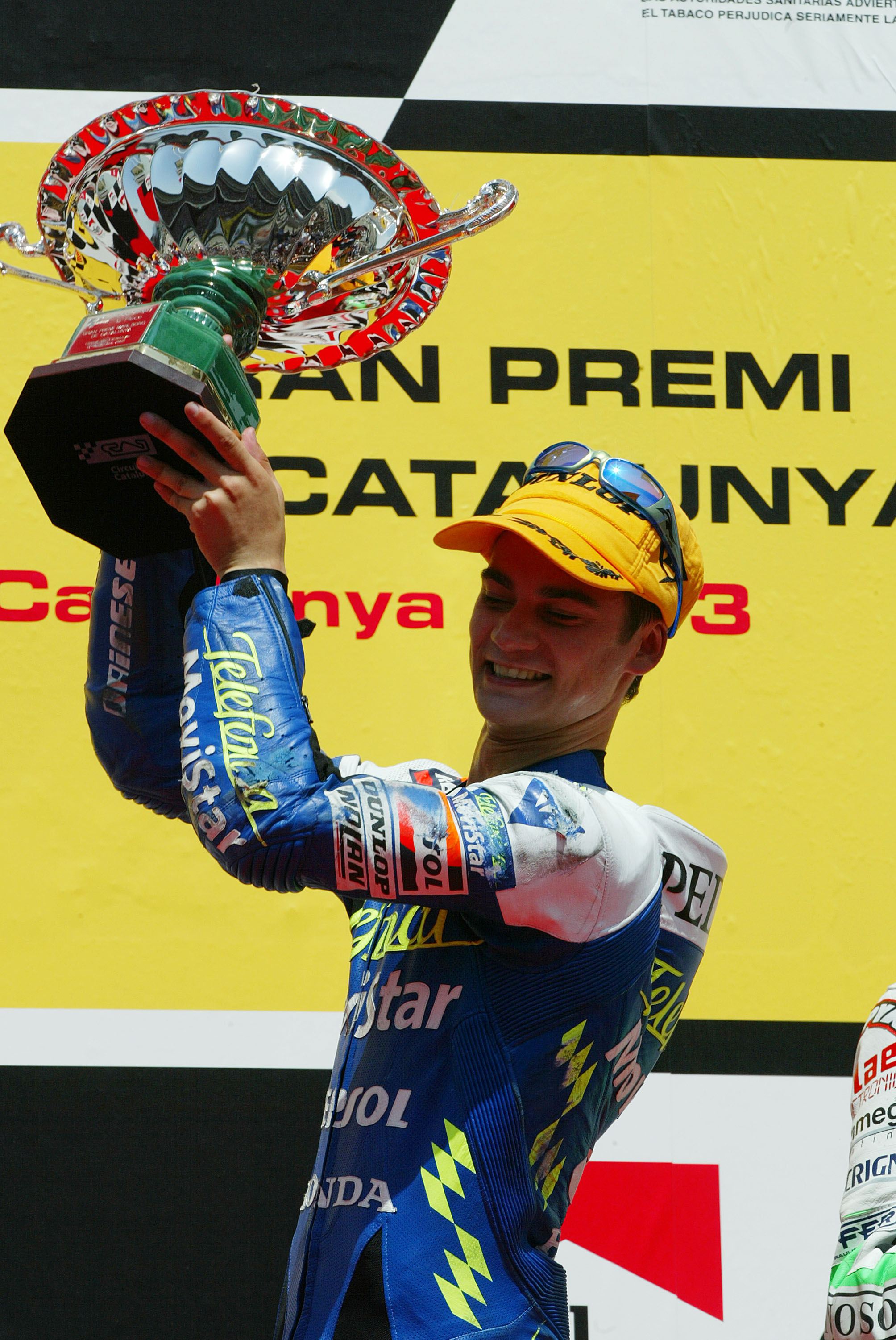
Dani Pedrosa, lifting his trophy on the podium after winning the 125cc race.

Pos.	No.	Rider	Manufacturer	Laps	Time/Retired	Grid	Points
1	3	(Spain) Daniel Pedrosa	Honda	22	41:16.672	6	25
2	12	(Switzerland) Thomas Lüthi	Honda	22	+0.137	14	20
3	15	(San Marino) Alex de Angelis	Aprilia	22	+0.315	5	16
4	17	(Germany) Steve Jenkner	Aprilia	22	+1.589	8	13
5	7	(Italy) Stefano Perugini	Aprilia	22	+19.874	9	11
6	48	(Spain) Jorge Lorenzo	Derbi	22	+22.560	11	10
7	36	(Finland) Mika Kallio	Honda	22	+22.647	19	9
8	23	(Italy) Gino Borsoi	Aprilia	22	+22.856	18	8
9	79	(Hungary) Gábor Talmácsi	Aprilia	22	+22.916	12	7
10	10	(Italy) Roberto Locatelli	KTM	22	+23.415	23	6
11	42	(Italy) Gioele Pellino	Aprilia	22	+31.815	13	5
12	6	(Italy) Mirko Giansanti	Aprilia	22	+34.948	20	4
13	63	(France) Mike Di Meglio	Aprilia	22	+40.938	15	3
14	1	(France) Arnaud Vincent	KTM	22	+41.163	17	2
15	24	(Italy) Simone Corsi	Honda	22	+41.405	16	1
16	58	(Italy) Marco Simoncelli	Aprilia	22	+41.888	22	
17	22	(Spain) Pablo Nieto	Aprilia	22	+51.330	1	
18	50	(Italy) Andrea Ballerini	Gilera	22	+51.993	26	
19	32	(Italy) Fabrizio Lai	Malaguti	22	+52.289	21	
20	25	(Hungary) Imre Tóth	Honda	22	+54.364	30	
21	11	(Italy) Max Sabbatani	Aprilia	22	+1:08.127	33	
22	8	(Japan) Masao Azuma	Honda	22	+1:09.768	24	
23	70	(Spain) Sergio Gadea	Aprilia	22	+1:22.794	27	
24	31	(Spain) Julián Simón	Malaguti	22	+1:32.672	28	
25	82	(Spain) Jordi Carchano	Honda	22	+1:40.507	35	
26	78	(Hungary) Péter Lénárt	Honda	22	+1:40.604	36	
27	21	(United Kingdom) Leon Camier	Honda	22	+1:40.730	32	
28	19	(Spain) Álvaro Bautista	Aprilia	17	+5 laps	29	
Ret	34	(Italy) Andrea Dovizioso	Honda	15	Accident	2	
Ret	80	(Spain) Héctor Barberá	Aprilia	15	Accident	4	
Ret	69	(Spain) David Bonache	Honda	14	Retirement	31	
Ret	4	(Italy) Lucio Cecchinello	Aprilia	13	Retirement	3	
Ret	41	(Japan) Youichi Ui	Aprilia	11	Retirement	7	
Ret	26	(Spain) Emilio Alzamora	Derbi	10	Retirement	25	
Ret	27	(Australia) Casey Stoner	Aprilia	9	Accident	10	
Ret	14	(United Kingdom) Chris Martin	Aprilia	7	Retirement	34	
WD	81	(Spain) Ismael Ortega	Aprilia		Withdrew		

== Championship standings after the race (MotoGP) ==
Below are the standings for the top five riders and constructors after round six has concluded.

Riders' Championship standings

Pos.	Rider	Points
1	(Italy) Valentino Rossi	135
2	(Spain) Sete Gibernau	88
3	(Italy) Max Biaggi	85
4	(Italy) Loris Capirossi	61
5	(Brazil) Alex Barros	54

Constructors' Championship standings

Pos.	Constructor	Points
1	(Japan) Honda	145
2	(Italy) Ducati	90
3	(Japan) Yamaha	70
4	(Italy) Aprilia	34
5	(Malaysia) / (United States) Proton KR	21

- Note: Only the top five positions are included for both sets of standings.

Previous race: 2003 Italian Grand Prix	FIM Grand Prix World Championship; 2003 season	Next race: 2003 Dutch TT
Previous race: 2002 Catalan Grand Prix	Catalan motorcycle Grand Prix	Next race: 2004 Catalan Grand Prix
