= 2004 Grand Prix motorcycle racing season =

Sports season

2004 F.I.M. Grand Prix motorcycle racing season

Seasons
- ← 2003 2005 →

2004 World Champions

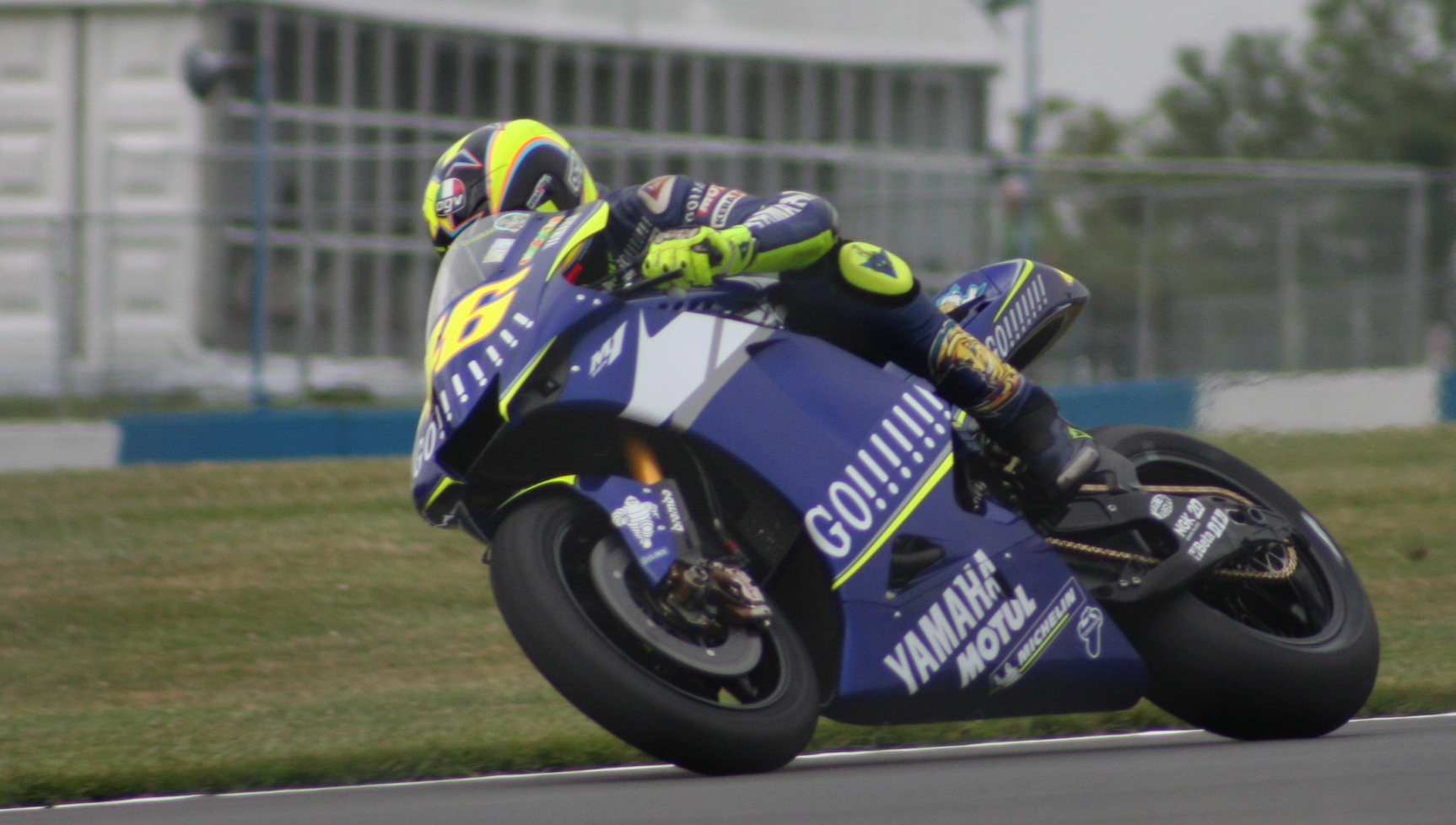
Valentino Rossi (pictured in 2005) became the MotoGP World Champion

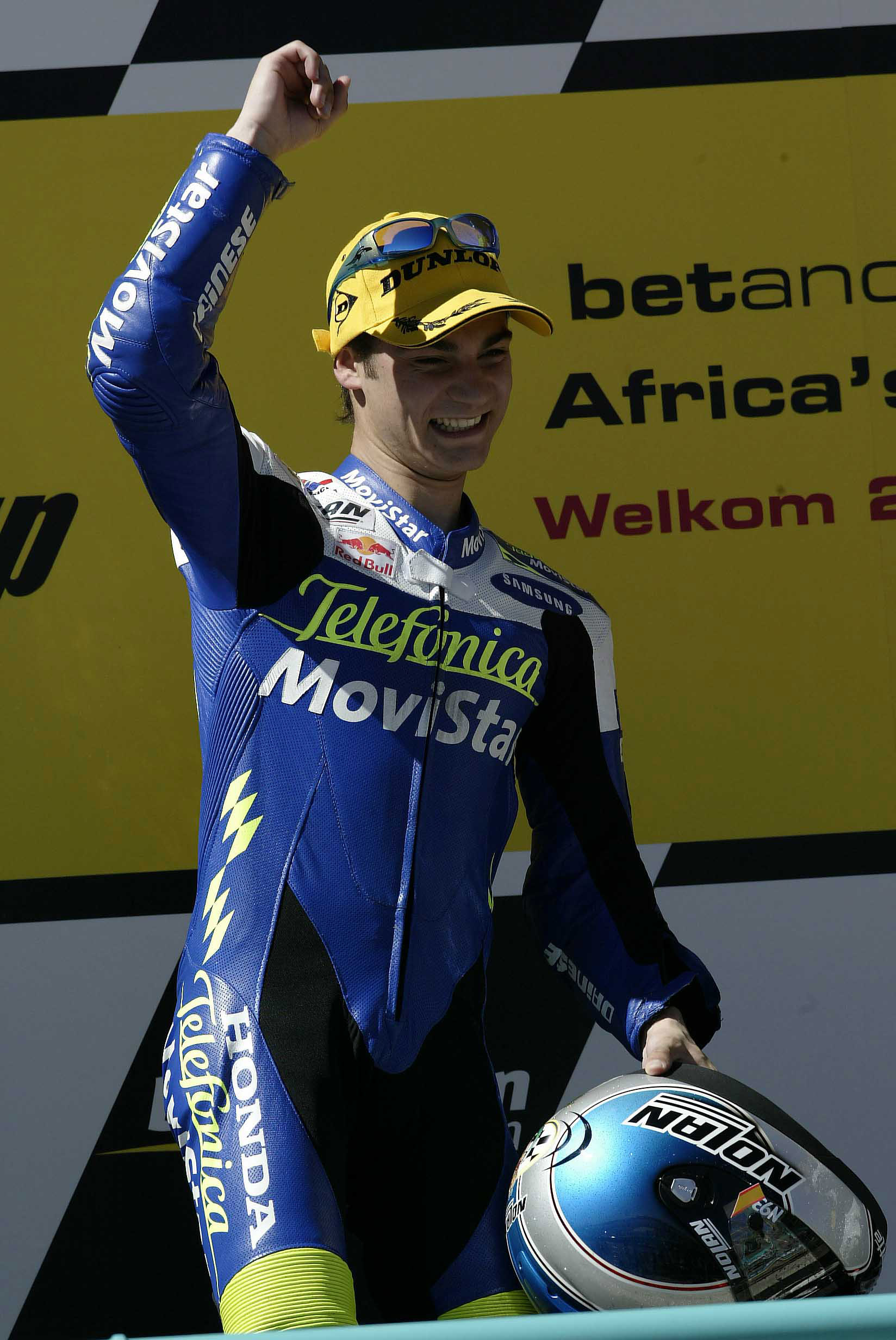
Daniel Pedrosa became the 250cc World Champion

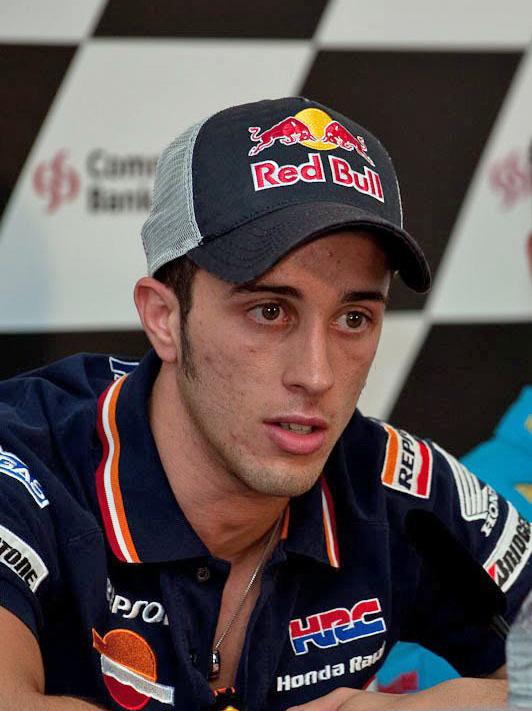
Andrea Dovizioso (pictured in 2010) became the 125cc World Champion

The 2004 Grand Prix motorcycle racing season was the 56th F.I.M. Road racing World Championship season. The season consisted of 16 races, beginning with the South African motorcycle Grand Prix on 18 April 2004 and ending with the Valencian Community motorcycle Grand Prix on 31 October.

== Season summary ==
=== MotoGP class ===
At the end of 2003, HRC and Valentino Rossi had parted ways, and HRC held Rossi to the letter of their contract which stipulated he could not ride another manufacturer's machine until 31 December 2003. Rossi's move to Yamaha, therefore, was a gamble on a manufacturer that hadn't had won a world championship in 12 years. Rossi won the first round of the season and lay to rest doubts about whether the rider or the motorcycle was more important when he achieved what no rider since Eddie Lawson had done in the history of the premier-class: he won back-to-back championships on different machines, Honda in 2003 and Yamaha in 2004.

Runner-up Sete Gibernau gave Rossi a strong challenge initially, but faded towards the end of the season. The friendship between him and Rossi frayed over the season, and snapped completely at the Qatar round.

Another change in 2004 was also d'Antin Team, who switched their alliance from Yamaha to Ducati motorcycles after five-year alliance with Yamaha, marked the first time Ducati MotoGP manufacturer introduced a satellite customer team.

At the Italian round, the race ran for 17 laps before rain started, and according to the rules at the time, the race was decided on a second, 6-lap race and the previous 17 laps only counted for grid positions. Conditions dried enough that the riders started the new race in slicks instead of wet-weather tires. In 2005 the rules were changed so that rain would no longer stop a race in MotoGP.

The Rookie of the Year was Rubén Xaus.

=== 250cc class ===
The 250cc title was won by Daniel Pedrosa on a Honda.

=== 125cc class ===
The 125cc title was won by Andrea Dovizioso on a Honda.

== 2004 Grand Prix season calendar ==
On 19 August 2003, the FIM released the initial 2004 calendar. In it, both the Japanese and the Pacific GPs were originally scheduled to take place. On 24 October 2003, the FIM confirmed the 2004 calendar. In it, the Japanese GP at Suzuka had been scrapped and was moved to Motegi and the all-new Qatar GP were to be held on a Saturday. On 16 December 2003, changes were made to the calendar. The date of the British GP was moved from 11 to 25 July and the date and day of the Rio GP were moved from Saturday 31 July to Sunday 4 July.

The following Grands Prix were scheduled to take place in 2004:

| Round | Date | Grand Prix | Circuit |
|---|---|---|---|
| 1 | 18 April | (South Africa) betandwin.com Africa's Grand Prix | Phakisa Freeway |
| 2 | 2 May | (Spain) Gran Premio Marlboro de España | Circuito de Jerez |
| 3 | 16 May | Grand Prix Polini de France | Bugatti Circuit |
| 4 | 6 June | (Italy) Gran Premio Cinzano d'Italia | Mugello Circuit |
| 5 | 13 June | (Catalonia) Gran Premi Gauloises de Catalunya | Circuit de Catalunya |
| 6 | 26 June †† | (Netherlands) Gauloises TT Assen | TT Circuit Assen |
| 7 | 4 July | (Rio de Janeiro (state)) Cinzano Rio Grand Prix | Autódromo Internacional Nelson Piquet |
| 8 | 18 July | (Germany) Veltins Motorrad Grand Prix Deutschland | Sachsenring |
| 9 | 25 July | (United Kingdom) Cinzano British Grand Prix | Donington Park |
| 10 | 22 August | (Czech Republic) Gauloises Grand Prix České republiky | Brno Circuit |
| 11 | 5 September | Grande Prémio Marlboro de Portugal | Autódromo do Estoril |
| 12 | 19 September | Camel Grand Prix of Japan | Twin Ring Motegi |
| 13 | 2 October †† | Marlboro Grand Prix of Qatar | Losail International Circuit |
| 14 | 10 October | (Malaysia) Marlboro Malaysian Motorcycle Grand Prix | Sepang International Circuit |
| 15 | 17 October | (Australia) Cinzano Australian Grand Prix | Phillip Island Grand Prix Circuit |
| 16 | 31 October | (Valencian Community) Gran Premio Marlboro Comunitat Valenciana | Circuit Ricardo Tormo |

†† = Saturday race

=== Calendar changes ===
- The Japanese Grand Prix moved from the Suzuka Circuit to the Twin Ring Motegi after the fatal accident of Japanese rider Daijiro Kato.
- The Japanese Grand Prix was moved back, from 6 April to 18 September.
- The Pacific Grand Prix was dropped after the Japanese Grand Prix was relocated to Twin Ring Motegi.
- The Qatar Grand Prix was added to the calendar.

== Regulation changes ==
The following changes are made to the regulation for the 2004 season:

=== Sporting regulations ===
- Restrictions have been introduced for testing. It is forbidden to test any bike between the fifteenth of one year and fifteenth of January of the next year, both dates being inclusive. This restriction counts for all teams in all three the classes who participated in the previous seasons as well as the teams that have been accepted to participate in the next season. The restriction applies to the testing of any bike used in any class of the FIM Road Racing World Championship Grand Prix with riders who are submitted for the Championship, or test riders.
- The end of a practice session will be designated by the waving of a chequered flag after which the exit of the pit lane will be closed. The time of a rider continues to be recorded until time has run out, after which a red light will be shown on the start line. After the chequered flag is out, all riders are allowed to compete one additional lap before they have to enter the pits.
- The grid positions will be changed. From now on, the grid will consist out of a singular row with three bikes compared to the previous four, sorted in a diagonal echelon formation. This change will only count for the MotoGP class, the 125 and 250cc classes will maintain the old four-row format. Each line will be offset and there must be a distance of nine metres between each row. If any rider delays the start, he may be penalised with a fine, a ride through penalty, disqualification or a withdrawal of championship points.
- During the race, the rider will be asked to ride through the pits, to which he may rejoin the race afterwards. Each rider must respect the speed limit, which is 85 km/h plus 10% according to Article 1.21.14. In case of a speed limit breach, a ride through will be issued and if a rider breaks the speed limit again, the black flag will be shown. If a race is restarted, this regulation will also be applied. If a race is interrupted before the penalty is enforced, and if there is a second part, the rider must take the ride through after the start of the second part of the race. In case a rider carries forward a penalty for anticipation of the start into the second part of an interrupted race and is subsequently found to have anticipated said second start, the rider will be shown a black flag and disqualified. After the team is notified, a yellow board (100 cm horizontal X 80 cm vertical) will be shown at the finish line displaying the rider's number (black colour, height 50 cm, stroke width 10 cm). This information will also be shown on the timekeeping monitors. If the rider fails to take the ride through after the board is shown to him three times, the rider will be shown a black flag and disqualified. If more than one rider is penalised, the riders will be instructed to take a ride through on the subsequent laps. The order of the riders will be based on the qualifying times where the faster rider goes first. If a rider fails to respond to instructions of the ride through and there multiple riders penalised, no rider will be signalled to take a ride through until the previous rider has completed the procedure or if he has been shown the black flag. If the organisation is unable to execute the ride through penalty before the end of the race, the penalised rider will get a time penalty of 20 seconds.
- New rules have been introduced regarding the behaviour of riders during practice runs as well as the race. All riders must obey the flag and light signals, as well as the boards which show instructions. Any infringement of this rule will then be penalised according the rules of Article 1.22. Riders must also ride in a responsible way, preventing danger to other competitors or participants either on the circuit or in the pits. If a rider breaks this rule, he will be penalised with a fine, a ride through, disqualification, a withdrawal of championship points or a suspension. Furthermore, riders are only allowed to use the circuit and the pits. However, if a rider accidentally leaves the track, he is allowed to rejoin it at the indicated place by the marshalls or at a specific place that does not give the rider an advantage. Any infringement of this rule during either the practice or warm-up will be penalised by the cancellation of the lap time and during the race by a ride through penalty. Other penalties such as a fine, disqualification or a withdrawal of championship points may also be imposed.
- New rules have been created for the flags and lights which are used to provide information. A blue flag waved at a flag marshall post indicates to a rider that he is about to be passed. During the practice sessions, the rider must keep his line and slow down gradually to allow a faster rider to pass him. If a rider is about to be lapped during the race, he must allow the following rider(s) to pass him at the earliest opportunity. Any infringement of this rule will be penalised via a fine, disqualification or a withdrawal of championship points. The blue flag will be shown waved to a rider who leaves the pit lane if traffic is approaching on the track at all times.
- If a yellow flag is waved at a flag marshal post, it indicates that there is a danger ahead. The rider must slow and be prepared to stop if needed. All overtaking is forbidden up to the point where the green flag is shown. Any infringement of this rule during a practice session will result in the cancellation of the lap time. If a rider breaks this rule during the race, he will be penalised with a ride through penalty. In both cases, other penalties such as a fine or suspension may also be imposed. If a rider realises he committed an infraction immediately after having overtaken someone, he must raise his hand and let the rider(s) past. If this happen, no penalty shall be issued.
- If a practice session or race is interrupted, the red flag will be waved at each flag marshal post and the red lights around the track will be switched on. All riders must adhere to the flags and lights and return slowly to the pits. When the pit exit is closed, the flag will be shown motionless at the exit and the light will be switched on. During this time, riders are forbidden to exit the pits. Any infringement of this rule will be penalised with a fine, disqualification, a withdrawal of championship points or a suspension. At the end of every practice and warm-up session, the red lights will be switched on at the start line. The red flag will be shown motionless on the starting grid at the end of the sighting lap(s) and at the end of the warm-up lap. The red flag may also be used to close the circuit. The red lights will be switched on at the start line for between two and five seconds to start each race.
- The flag is used to transfer instructions to a specific rider and is displayed motionless at each flag marshal post, together with the rider's number. The rider must stop at the pits at the end of his current lap and is not allowed to restart. This flag will only be shown after the rider's team has been notified. Any infringement of this rule will be penalised with a fine, disqualification, a withdrawal of championship points or a suspension.
- The black flag with orange disk is used to transfer instructions to a specific rider and is displayed motionless at each flag marshal post, together with the rider's number. This flag informs the rider that his motorcycle has mechanical problems which could endanger himself or others around him and therefor must leave the circuit immediately. Any infringement of this rule will be penalised with a fine, disqualification, a withdrawal of championship points or a suspension.
- New rules have been created for the interruption of a race. In the 125 and 250cc classes, if the calculated results show that two-thirds of the original race distance have been completed by the race leader and all other riders on the same lap as the leader, the race will be considered as completed and full championship points will be handed out. For the MotoGP class, the race will be restarted later on for a minimum of five laps according to Article 1.26. If it's not possible to restart the race, the race will be considered as completed and full championship points will be handed out.
- Rules have been introduced to clarify the distribution of championship points and possible problems that could arise in the classification. In the event of a tie in the distributed number of points, the final positions will be decided on the basis of the number of best place finishes in the races (number of first places, number of second places and so on). If there is still a tie, the date in the championship at which the highest place was acquired will be used with precedence going to the latest results.
- The penalties which will be handed out to riders are as follows: warnings, fines, ride through penalties, time penalties, disqualification, withdrawal of championship points, suspensions and exclusions.
- The following penalties may be given out by the Race Direction: a warning, fine, ride through penalty, time penalty, disqualification, withdrawal of championship points or suspension. Furthermore, if needed, the Race Direction can refer the cases to the International Disciplinary Court (CDI) to impose a higher penalty than the Race Direction is allowed to.
- The riders are not permitted to lodge an appeal against a decision of the Race Direction to impose a ride through penalty.
- All decisions of the Race Direction or of the FIM stewards must be notified directly at the event venue or, failing that, addressed by a registered letter with an acknowledgement of receipt. All judgements of the CDI mut be notified via a registered letter with acknowledgement of receipt in order to inform all the involved parties.
- The disciplinary or arbitration body handing out a penalty or deciding on a protest or appeal must have its findings published and quote the names of all involved parties. Every person who is quoted in these statements have no right of action against either the FIM or the person who published the statement. The final decisions will be published by the Media Centre and the official FIM magazine unless the Court itself decides differently.
- Changes have been made to the payment of fines and costs. If a penalty is definitive, all fines must be paid into the Benevolent Fund before the start of the first practice of the second race following the final decision. The fine must be paid to the FIM Executive Secretariat within thirty days of notice of the judgement decision according to Article 3.5.5. The rider who is affected by the decision will be automatically suspended from participating in all FIM activities until the full payment has been received.
- A new FIM Anti-Doping Code has been set up and will come into force on 1 July 2004.

This rule was additionally added on 27 March 2004:

- While riders can enter the pits during the race, taking the bike inside the pit box is not allowed. Infringement of this rule will result in a disqualification. Refuelling is also strictly forbidden. Working in a pit box is permitted during breaks, but only if the race is interrupted.

=== Technical regulations ===
- All classes will be changed. From now on, they will be designated by the engine capacity. The 125cc class will have its capacity changed from 80cc to 125cc with a maximum of one cylinder, the 250cc class will have its capacity changed from 175cc to 250cc with a maximum of two cylinders. The MotoGP class two-stroke bikes will have its capacity changed from 350cc to 500cc with a maximum of four cylinders and the four-stroke bikes will have its capacity changed from 350cc to 990cc with an unlimited amount of cylinders. All the four-stroke motorcycles who participate in the MotoGP class must be prototypes. Those that are not entered by a member of the MSMA must be approved for participation by the Grand Prix Commission.
- All fuel lines from the fuel tank to the engine/carburetor must have a self-sealing breakaway valve, with the exception of the case when a fuel tank is fixed on the chassis with bolts. The valve must be separated at less than 50% of the load which is required to break any part of the fuel line or fitting, or to pull it out of the fuel tank.
- The fuel tank capacities for all prototype motorcycles are a maximum of 32 litres for two-stroke engines and a maximum of 24 litres for four-stroke engines. This fuel tank capacity for four-stroke engines will be further reduced to 22 litres from 2005 onwards.

These rules were additionally added on 27 March 2004:

- Rules have been created to clarify the minimum weights of the MotoGP four-strokes. If a bike has three cylinders or less, the minimum weight has to be 138 kg. If a bike has three cylinders or less with an oval piston, the minimum weight has to be 148 kg. If a bike has either four or five cylinders, the minimum weight has to be 148 kg. If a bike has four or more cylinders with an oval piston, the minimum weight has to be 158 kg. If a bike has six cylinders or more, the minimum weight has to be 158 kg.
- To remove the variable element of the weight of any remaining fuel, all 125cc and 250cc bikes will be weighed without the fuel tanks for which a 2 kg allowance will be made.

== 2004 Grand Prix season results ==
| Round | Date | Grand Prix | Circuit | 125cc winner | 250cc winner | MotoGP winner | Report |
|---|---|---|---|---|---|---|---|
| 1 | 18 April | (South Africa) South African motorcycle Grand Prix | Phakisa | (Italy) Andrea Dovizioso | (Spain) Daniel Pedrosa | (Italy) Valentino Rossi | Report |
| 2 | 2 May | (Spain) Spanish motorcycle Grand Prix | Jerez | (Italy) Marco Simoncelli | (Italy) Roberto Rolfo | (Spain) Sete Gibernau | Report |
| 3 | 16 May | (France) French motorcycle Grand Prix | Le Mans | (Italy) Andrea Dovizioso | (Spain) Daniel Pedrosa | (Spain) Sete Gibernau | Report |
| 4 | 6 June | (Italy) Italian motorcycle Grand Prix | Mugello | (Italy) Roberto Locatelli | (Argentina) Sebastián Porto | (Italy) Valentino Rossi | Report |
| 5 | 13 June | (Catalonia) Catalan motorcycle Grand Prix | Catalunya | (Spain) Héctor Barberá | (France) Randy de Puniet | (Italy) Valentino Rossi | Report |
| 6 | 26 June †† | (Netherlands) Dutch TT | Assen | (Spain) Jorge Lorenzo | (Argentina) Sebastián Porto | (Italy) Valentino Rossi | Report |
| 7 | 4 July | (Rio de Janeiro (state)) Rio de Janeiro motorcycle Grand Prix | Rio de Janeiro | (Spain) Héctor Barberá | (San Marino) Manuel Poggiali | (Japan) Makoto Tamada | Report |
| 8 | 18 July | (Germany) German motorcycle Grand Prix | Sachsenring | (Italy) Roberto Locatelli | (Spain) Daniel Pedrosa | (Italy) Max Biaggi | Report |
| 9 | 25 July | (United Kingdom) British motorcycle Grand Prix | Donington | (Italy) Andrea Dovizioso | (Spain) Daniel Pedrosa | (Italy) Valentino Rossi | Report |
| 10 | 22 August | Czech Republic motorcycle Grand Prix | Brno | (Spain) Jorge Lorenzo | (Argentina) Sebastián Porto | (Spain) Sete Gibernau | Report |
| 11 | 5 September | (Portugal) Portuguese motorcycle Grand Prix | Estoril | (Spain) Héctor Barberá | (Spain) Toni Elías | (Italy) Valentino Rossi | Report |
| 12 | 19 September | (Japan) Japanese motorcycle Grand Prix | Motegi | (Italy) Andrea Dovizioso | (Spain) Daniel Pedrosa | (Japan) Makoto Tamada | Report |
| 13 | 2 October †† | Qatar motorcycle Grand Prix | Losail | (Spain) Jorge Lorenzo | (Argentina) Sebastián Porto | (Spain) Sete Gibernau | Report |
| 14 | 10 October | (Malaysia) Malaysian motorcycle Grand Prix | Sepang | (Australia) Casey Stoner | (Spain) Daniel Pedrosa | (Italy) Valentino Rossi | Report |
| 15 | 17 October | (Australia) Australian motorcycle Grand Prix | Phillip Island | (Italy) Andrea Dovizioso | (Argentina) Sebastián Porto | (Italy) Valentino Rossi | Report |
| 16 | 31 October | Valencian Community motorcycle Grand Prix | Valencia | (Spain) Héctor Barberá | (Spain) Daniel Pedrosa | (Italy) Valentino Rossi | Report |

†† = Saturday race

== Participants ==
=== MotoGP participants ===
| Team | Constructor | Motorcycle | Tyres | No. | Rider | Rounds |
|---|---|---|---|---|---|---|
| (Italy) MS Aprilia Racing | Aprilia | RS Cube | M | 67 | (United Kingdom) Shane Byrne | 1–10, 12 |
| (Italy) MS Aprilia Racing | Aprilia | RS Cube | M | 84 | (Italy) Michel Fabrizio | 11 |
| (Italy) MS Aprilia Racing | Aprilia | RS Cube | M | 24 | (Australia) Garry McCoy | 14–16 |
| (Italy) MS Aprilia Racing | Aprilia | RS Cube | M | 99 | (United Kingdom) Jeremy McWilliams | All |
| (Italy) Ducati Marlboro Team | Ducati | Desmosedici GP4 | M | 12 | (Australia) Troy Bayliss | All |
| (Italy) Ducati Marlboro Team | Ducati | Desmosedici GP4 | M | 65 | (Italy) Loris Capirossi | All |
| (Spain) D'Antin MotoGP | Ducati | Desmosedici GP3 | M | 11 | (Spain) Rubén Xaus | All |
| (Spain) D'Antin MotoGP | Ducati | Desmosedici GP3 | M | 50 | (United Kingdom) Neil Hodgson | All |
| (United Kingdom) WCM | Harris WCM | Harris WCM | D | 35 | (United Kingdom) Chris Burns | 2–9, 11, 16 |
| (United Kingdom) WCM | Harris WCM | Harris WCM | D | 41 | (Japan) Youichi Ui | 12–15 |
| (United Kingdom) WCM | Harris WCM | Harris WCM | D | 84 | (Italy) Michel Fabrizio | 1–6, 8–10 |
| (United Kingdom) WCM | Harris WCM | Harris WCM | D | 52 | (Spain) José David de Gea | 7 |
| (United Kingdom) WCM | Harris WCM | Harris WCM | D | 77 | (United Kingdom) James Ellison | 10–11, 13–16 |
| (Japan) Repsol Honda Team | Honda | RC211V | M | 4 | (Brazil) Alex Barros | All |
| (Japan) Repsol Honda Team | Honda | RC211V | M | 69 | (United States) Nicky Hayden | 1–10, 12–16 |
| (Japan) HRC | Honda | RC211V | M | 72 | (Japan) Tohru Ukawa | 12 |
| (Italy) Telefónica Movistar Honda MotoGP | Honda | RC211V | M | 15 | (Spain) Sete Gibernau | All |
| (Italy) Telefónica Movistar Honda MotoGP | Honda | RC211V | M | 45 | (United States) Colin Edwards | All |
| (Spain) Camel Honda | Honda | RC211V | M | 3 | (Italy) Max Biaggi | All |
| (Spain) Camel Honda | Honda | RC211V | B | 6 | (Japan) Makoto Tamada | All |
| (Japan) Kawasaki Racing Team | Kawasaki | Ninja ZX-RR | B | 56 | (Japan) Shinya Nakano | All |
| (Japan) Kawasaki Racing Team | Kawasaki | Ninja ZX-RR | B | 66 | (Germany) Alex Hofmann | All |
| (Japan) Moriwaki Racing | Moriwaki | MD211VF | D | 88 | (Australia) Andrew Pitt | 4–5, 10 |
| (Japan) Moriwaki Racing | Moriwaki | MD211VF | D | 19 | (France) Olivier Jacque | 12, 16 |
| (Malaysia) / (United States) Proton Team KR | Proton KR | KR5 | D | 9 | (Japan) Nobuatsu Aoki | All |
| (Malaysia) / (United States) Proton Team KR | Proton KR | KR5 | D | 80 | (United States) Kurtis Roberts | 1–10, 16 |
| (Malaysia) / (United States) Proton Team KR | Proton KR | KR5 | D | 36 | (United Kingdom) James Haydon | 13–15 |
| (Japan) Team Suzuki MotoGP | Suzuki | GSV-R | B | 10 | (United States) Kenny Roberts Jr. | 1–12 |
| (Japan) Team Suzuki MotoGP | Suzuki | GSV-R | B | 71 | (Japan) Yukio Kagayama | 13–14 |
| (Japan) Team Suzuki MotoGP | Suzuki | GSV-R | B | 32 | (Spain) Gregorio Lavilla | 15–16 |
| (Japan) Team Suzuki MotoGP | Suzuki | GSV-R | B | 21 | (United States) John Hopkins | 1–3, 5–16 |
| (Japan) Team Suzuki MotoGP | Suzuki | GSV-R | B | 32 | (Spain) Gregorio Lavilla | 5, 10 |
| (Japan) Gauloises Fortuna Yamaha | Yamaha | YZR-M1 | M | 7 | (Spain) Carlos Checa | All |
| (Japan) Gauloises Fortuna Yamaha | Yamaha | YZR-M1 | M | 46 | (Italy) Valentino Rossi | All |
| (France) Fortuna Gauloises Tech 3 | Yamaha | YZR-M1 | M | 17 | (Japan) Norifumi Abe | All |
| (France) Fortuna Gauloises Tech 3 | Yamaha | YZR-M1 | M | 33 | (Italy) Marco Melandri | All |

Key
Regular rider
Wildcard rider
Replacement rider

=== 250cc participants ===
| Team | Constructor | Motorcycle | Tyres | No. | Rider | Rounds |
|---|---|---|---|---|---|---|
| Fortuna Honda | Honda | Honda RS250RW | D | 2 | (Italy) Roberto Rolfo | All |
| Fortuna Honda | Honda | Honda RS250RW | D | 24 | (Spain) Toni Elías | All |
| Telefónica Movistar Honda 250cc | Honda | Honda RS250RW | D | 26 | (Spain) Daniel Pedrosa | All |
| Telefónica Movistar Honda 250cc | Honda | Honda RS250RW | D | 73 | (Japan) Hiroshi Aoyama | All |
| Wurth Honda BQR | Honda | Honda RS250R | D | 6 | (Spain) Alex Debón | All |
| Wurth Honda BQR | Honda | Honda RS250R | D | 34 | (France) Eric Bataille | 1–8, 10–12 |
| Wurth Honda BQR | Honda | Honda RS250R | D | 52 | (Spain) José David de Gea | 9, 13–16 |
| Safilo Carrera – LCR | Aprilia | Aprilia RSV 250 | D | 7 | (France) Randy de Puniet | All |
| Team UGT Kurz | Yamaha | Yamaha TZ 250 | D | 8 | (Japan) Naoki Matsudo | All |
| Team UGT Kurz | Yamaha | Yamaha TZ 250 | D | 36 | (France) Erwan Nigon | 1, 3–8 |
| Team UGT Kurz | Yamaha | Yamaha TZ 250 | D | 43 | (Czech Republic) Radomil Rous | 9–16 |
| Team UGT Kurz | Yamaha | Yamaha TZ 250 | D | 63 | (Italy) Jarno Ronzoni | 2 |
| Freesoul Abruzzo Racing Team | Aprilia | Aprilia RSV 250 | D | 9 | (France) Hugo Marchand | All |
| Freesoul Abruzzo Racing Team | Aprilia | Aprilia RSV 250 | D | 14 | (Australia) Anthony West | 1–15 |
| Freesoul Abruzzo Racing Team | Aprilia | Aprilia RSV 250 | D | 27 | (Italy) Valerio Anghetti | 10 |
| Freesoul Abruzzo Racing Team | Aprilia | Aprilia RSV 250 | D | 63 | (Italy) Jarno Ronzoni | 16 |
| Repsol – Aspar Team 250cc | Aprilia | Aprilia RSV 250 | D | 10 | (Spain) Fonsi Nieto | All |
| Repsol – Aspar Team 250cc | Aprilia | Aprilia RSV 250 | D | 19 | (Argentina) Sebastián Porto | All |
| Grefusa – Aspar Team 250cc | Aprilia | Aprilia RSV 250 | D | 22 | (Spain) Iván Silva | 6 |
| Grefusa – Aspar Team 250cc | Aprilia | Aprilia RSV 250 | D | 28 | (Germany) Dirk Heidolf | 1–5, 7–16 |
| Grefusa – Aspar Team 250cc | Aprilia | Aprilia RSV 250 | D | 33 | (Spain) Héctor Faubel | 1–7, 9–16 |
| Campetella Racing | Aprilia | Aprilia RSV 250 | D | 11 | (Spain) Joan Olivé | All |
| Campetella Racing | Aprilia | Aprilia RSV 250 | D | 21 | (Italy) Franco Battaini | All |
| Campetella Racing | Aprilia | Aprilia RSV 250 | D | 43 | (Czech Republic) Radomil Rous | 2–3 |
| Campetella Racing | Aprilia | Aprilia RSV 250 | D | 50 | (France) Sylvain Guintoli | All |
| Equipe GP de France – Scrab | Aprilia | Aprilia RSV 250 | D | 12 | (France) Arnaud Vincent | 1–4, 6–12, 16 |
| Equipe GP de France – Scrab | Aprilia | Aprilia RSV 250 | D | 36 | (France) Erwan Nigon | 9–16 |
| Equipe GP de France – Scrab | Aprilia | Aprilia RSV 250 | D | 42 | (France) Grégory Leblanc | 13–15 |
| Equipe GP de France – Scrab | Aprilia | Aprilia RSV 250 | D | 72 | (France) David Fouloi | 5 |
| Equipe GP de France – Scrab | Aprilia | Aprilia RSV 250 | D | 77 | (France) Grégory Lefort | 1–8 |
| Castrol-Honda Kiefer Racing | Honda | Honda RS250R | D | 15 | (Germany) Christian Gemmel | 1–4 |
| Castrol-Honda Kiefer Racing | Honda | Honda RS250R | D | 17 | (Germany) Klaus Nöhles | 6–14 |
| Castrol-Honda Kiefer Racing | Honda | Honda RS250R | D | 63 | (Italy) Jarno Ronzoni | 5 |
| Castrol-Honda Kiefer Racing | Honda | Honda RS250R | D | 64 | (Sweden) Frederik Watz | 16 |
| Castrol-Honda Kiefer Racing | Honda | Honda RS250R | D | 82 | (Australia) Joshua Waters | 15 |
| Aprilia Germany | Aprilia | Aprilia RSV 250 | D | 16 | (Sweden) Johan Stigefelt | All |
| Aprilia Germany | Aprilia | Aprilia RSV 250 | D | 57 | (United Kingdom) Chaz Davies | All |
| Matteoni Racing | Aprilia | Aprilia RSV 250 | D | 25 | (Italy) Alex Baldolini | All |
| NC World Trade | Yamaha | Yamaha TZ 250 | B | 30 | (Spain) José Luis Cardoso | 5 |
| NC World Trade | Yamaha | Yamaha TZ 250 | B | 40 | (Italy) Max Sabbatani | 1–9 |
| NC World Trade | Yamaha | Yamaha TZ 250 | B | 44 | (Japan) Taro Sekiguchi | All |
| NC World Trade | Yamaha | Yamaha TZ 250 | B | 88 | (Hungary) Gergő Talmácsi | 10–16 |
| MS Aprilia Team | Aprilia | Aprilia RSV 250 | D | 37 | (Italy) Marcellino Lucchi | 14 |
| MS Aprilia Team | Aprilia | Aprilia RSV 250 | D | 54 | (San Marino) Manuel Poggiali | 1–13, 15–16 |
| Aprilia Racing | Aprilia | Aprilia RSV 250 | D | 51 | (San Marino) Alex de Angelis | All |
| Molenaar Racing | Honda | Honda RS250R | D | 96 | (Czech Republic) Jakub Smrž | All |
| Mas Racing Team-A.Molina | Aprilia | Aprilia RSV 250 | D | 41 | (Spain) Álvaro Molina | 2, 16 |
| Leblanc Racing Team | Aprilia | Aprilia RSV 250 | D | 42 | (France) Grégory Leblanc | 2–3, 10–11, 16 |
| Team Racer Bike | Honda | Honda RS250R | | 45 | (France) Samuel Aubry | 3 |
| Eisen Moto Team | Honda | Honda RS250R | | 46 | (France) Vincent Eisen | 3 |
| ASMV Scaccia | Yamaha | Yamaha TZ 250 | | 47 | (France) Marc-Antoine Scaccia | 3 |
| Dydo Miu Racing | Honda | Honda RS250R | B | 55 | (Japan) Yuki Takahashi | 12 |
| Benjan Motoren | Yamaha | Yamaha TZ 250 | | 58 | (Netherlands) Patrick Lakerveld | 6 |
| Performance Racing | Honda | Honda RS250R | D | 59 | (Netherlands) Hans Smees | 6, 16 |
| Jaap Kingma Racing | Aprilia | Aprilia RSV 250 | | 60 | (Netherlands) Emile Litjens | 6 |
| De Arend – Filart Racing | Aprilia | Aprilia RSV 250 | D | 61 | (Netherlands) Randy Gevers | 6 |
| De Arend – Filart Racing | Aprilia | Aprilia RSV 250 | D | 71 | (Netherlands) Henk van de Lagemaat | 10 |
| MRTT Hugen Racing | Yamaha | Yamaha TZ 250 | | 62 | (Netherlands) Jan Roelofs | 6 |
| Roma Racing | Yamaha | Yamaha TZ 250 | D | 63 | (Italy) Jarno Ronzoni | 4 |
| Agesta Transport | Yamaha | Yamaha TZ 250 | D | 64 | (Sweden) Frederik Watz | 9 |
| Galemain Racing | Honda | Honda RS250R | D | 65 | (United Kingdom) Lee Dickinson | 9 |
| Manhattan Racing | Yamaha | Yamaha TZ 250 | D | 66 | (United Kingdom) Tony Campbell | 9 |
| BDR Racing | Honda | Honda RS250R | D | 67 | (United Kingdom) Bruce Dunn | 9 |
| Burning Blood RT | Honda | Honda RS250R | D | 70 | (Japan) Choujun Kameya | 12 |
| Team Harc-Pro | Honda | Honda RS250R | B | 76 | (Japan) Shuhei Aoyama | 12 |
| Endurance | Honda | Honda RS250R | B | 78 | (Japan) Yuzo Fujioka | 12 |
| SP Tadao Racing Team | Yamaha | Yamaha TZ 250 | D | 79 | (Japan) Katsuyuki Nakasuga | 12 |
| EMS Racing | Honda | Honda RS250R | D | 80 | (Australia) Peter Taplin | 15 |
| Turramurra Cyclery | Yamaha | Yamaha TZ 250 | D | 81 | (Australia) Mark Rowling | 15 |
| whitetiger.com.au | Yamaha | Yamaha TZ 250 | D | 84 | (Australia) Ben Ried | 15 |

Key
Regular rider
Wildcard rider
Replacement rider

=== 125cc participants ===
| Team | Constructor | Motorcycle | Tyres | No. | Rider | Rounds |
|---|---|---|---|---|---|---|
| Seedorf Racing | Aprilia | Aprilia RS 125 R | D | 3 | (Spain) Héctor Barberá | All |
| Seedorf Racing | Aprilia | Aprilia RS 125 R | D | 19 | (Spain) Álvaro Bautista | All |
| Seedorf Racing | Aprilia | Aprilia RS 125 R | D | 81 | (Spain) Ismael Ortega | 2 |
| Matteoni Racing | Aprilia | Aprilia RS 125 R | D | 6 | (Italy) Mirko Giansanti | All |
| Matteoni Racing | Aprilia | Aprilia RS 125 R | D | 28 | (Spain) Jordi Carchano | All |
| Metis Gilera Racing Team | Gilera | Gilera 125 GP | D | 7 | (Italy) Stefano Perugini | All |
| Metis Gilera Racing Team | Gilera | Gilera 125 GP | D | 32 | (Italy) Fabrizio Lai | All |
| Semprucci Malaguti | Malaguti | Malaguti 125 | D | 8 | (Italy) Manuel Manna | All |
| Semprucci Malaguti | Malaguti | Malaguti 125 | D | 14 | (Hungary) Gábor Talmácsi | All |
| Angaia Racing | Honda | Honda RS125R | D | 9 | (Czech Republic) Markéta Janáková | 6–8, 10–14, 16 |
| Angaia Racing | Honda | Honda RS125R | D | 10 | (Spain) Julián Simón | 1–11, 13–16 |
| Angaia Racing | Honda | Honda RS125R | D | 11 | (Italy) Mattia Angeloni | 1–5 |
| Angaia Racing | Honda | Honda RS125R | D | 30 | (Italy) Raffaele De Rosa | 9 |
| Angaia Racing | Honda | Honda RS125R | D | 46 | (Australia) Matthew Kuhne | 15 |
| Angaia Racing | Honda | Honda RS125R | D | 62 | (Japan) Toshihisa Kuzuhara | 14 |
| Angaia Racing | Aprilia | Aprilia RS 125 R | D | 43 | (Spain) Manuel Hernández | 12 |
| Elit Grand Prix | Honda | Honda RS125R | D | 12 | (Switzerland) Thomas Lüthi | 1–4, 8–16 |
| Elit Grand Prix | Honda | Honda RS125R | D | 26 | (Germany) Dario Giuseppetti | 1–6, 10–16 |
| Elit Grand Prix | Honda | Honda RS125R | D | 35 | (Czech Republic) Václav Bittman | 8–9 |
| Elit Grand Prix | Honda | Honda RS125R | D | 35 | (Czech Republic) Václav Bittman | 10 |
| Safilo Carrera – LCR | Aprilia | Aprilia RS 125 R | D | 15 | (Italy) Roberto Locatelli | All |
| Safilo Carrera – LCR | Aprilia | Aprilia RS 125 R | D | 54 | (Italy) Mattia Pasini | All |
| Molenaar Racing | Honda | Honda RS125R | D | 16 | (Netherlands) Raymond Schouten | 1–4, 6–16 |
| Sterilgarda Racing | Aprilia | Aprilia RS 125 R | D | 18 | (Italy) Simone Sanna | 8–9 |
| Sterilgarda Racing | Aprilia | Aprilia RS 125 R | D | 45 | (Italy) Lorenzo Zanetti | 10–16 |
| Sterilgarda Racing | Aprilia | Aprilia RS 125 R | D | 50 | (Italy) Andrea Ballerini | 1–7 |
| Rauch Bravo | Aprilia | Aprilia RS 125 R | D | 21 | (Germany) Steve Jenkner | All |
| Rauch Bravo | Aprilia | Aprilia RS 125 R | D | 58 | (Italy) Marco Simoncelli | 1–14 |
| Rauch Bravo | Aprilia | Aprilia RS 125 R | D | 37 | (Italy) Michele Pirro | 16 |
| Master – Repsol Team 125cc | Aprilia | Aprilia RS 125 R | D | 22 | (Spain) Pablo Nieto | All |
| Master – Repsol Team 125cc | Aprilia | Aprilia RS 125 R | D | 33 | (Spain) Sergio Gadea | All |
| Globet.com Racing | Aprilia | Aprilia RS 125 R | D | 23 | (Italy) Gino Borsoi | All |
| Globet.com Racing | Aprilia | Aprilia RS 125 R | D | 59 | (Spain) Nicolás Terol | 16 |
| Globet.com Racing | Aprilia | Aprilia RS 125 R | D | 63 | (France) Mike Di Meglio | 1–15 |
| Kopron Team Scot | Honda | Honda RS125R | D | 24 | (Italy) Simone Corsi | All |
| Kopron Team Scot | Honda | Honda RS125R | D | 34 | (Italy) Andrea Dovizioso | All |
| Team Hungary | Aprilia | Aprilia RS 125 R | D | 25 | (Hungary) Imre Tóth | All |
| Team Hungary | Aprilia | Aprilia RS 125 R | D | 66 | (Finland) Vesa Kallio | All |
| Red Bull KTM | KTM | KTM 125 FRR | D | 27 | (Australia) Casey Stoner | 1–8, 10–16 |
| Red Bull KTM | KTM | KTM 125 FRR | D | 36 | (Finland) Mika Kallio | All |
| Ajo Motorsport | Honda | Honda RS125R | D | 31 | (Italy) Max Sabbatani | 13–16 |
| Ajo Motorsport | Honda | Honda RS125R | D | 38 | (Finland) Mikko Kyyhkynen | 5–7 |
| Ajo Motorsport | Honda | Honda RS125R | D | 52 | (Czech Republic) Lukáš Pešek | All |
| Ajo Motorsport | Honda | Honda RS125R | D | 69 | (Denmark) Robbin Harms | 1–4, 8–12 |
| Abruzzo Racing Team | Aprilia | Aprilia RS 125 R | D | 41 | (Japan) Youichi Ui | 1–9 |
| Abruzzo Racing Team | Aprilia | Aprilia RS 125 R | D | 42 | (Italy) Gioele Pellino | All |
| Abruzzo Racing Team | Aprilia | Aprilia RS 125 R | D | 50 | (Italy) Andrea Ballerini | 10–16 |
| Abruzzo Racing Team | Aprilia | Aprilia RS 125 R | D | 73 | (Italy) Michele Danese | 4 |
| Caja Madrid Derbi Racing | Derbi | Derbi 125 GP | D | 47 | (Spain) Ángel Rodríguez | All |
| Caja Madrid Derbi Racing | Derbi | Derbi 125 GP | D | 48 | (Spain) Jorge Lorenzo | All |
| ADAC Honda Team | Honda | Honda RS125R | D | 20 | (Germany) Georg Fröhlich | 2–3, 8–10 |
| Motorrad Unger Racing | Aprilia | Aprilia RS 125 R | D | 39 | (Germany) Patrick Unger | 8 |
| Team Freudenberg | Honda | Honda RS125R | D | 40 | (Germany) Manuel Mickan | 8 |
| Team Hernandez | Aprilia | Aprilia RS 125 R | D | 43 | (Spain) Manuel Hernández | 2, 5, 11, 16 |
| Tennen Racing | Honda | Honda RS125R | D | 44 | (Netherlands) Frank van den Dragt | 6 |
| UK1 Racing | Honda | Honda RS125R | D | 49 | (United Kingdom) Christian Elkin | 9 |
| Brooklands Autobody Centre | Honda | Honda RS125R | D | 51 | (United Kingdom) Kris Weston | 9 |
| Gold Racing | Aprilia | Aprilia RS 125 R | D | 53 | (Italy) Stefano Bianco | 4 |
| Tassie Windscreens | Honda | Honda RS125R | D | 56 | (Australia) Brett Simmonds | 15 |
| Racc Caja Madrid | Honda | Honda RS125R | D | 57 | (Spain) Aleix Espargaró | 16 |
| RCGM Team F.M.I. | Aprilia | Aprilia RS 125 R | D | 61 | (Italy) Michele Pirro | 4 |
| Honda Kumamoto Racing | Honda | Honda RS125R | D | 62 | (Japan) Toshihisa Kuzuhara | 12 |
| Team Tec. 2 & Feel | Yamaha | Yamaha TZ125 | B | 64 | (Japan) Shigeki Norikane | 12 |
| Thai Honda Castrol/ERP | Honda | Honda RS125R | B | 67 | (Thailand) Suhathai Chaemsap | 12 |
| RC Recouso Sport | Honda | Honda RS125R | D | 68 | (Argentina) Fabricio Perrén | 5 |
| MIR Racing | Aprilia | Aprilia RS 125 R | D | 70 | (Spain) Julián Miralles | 2–3, 8, 16 |
| TMR Competicion | Honda | Honda RS125R | D | 71 | (Spain) Enrique Jerez | 2, 5, 16 |
| TMR Competicion | Honda | Honda RS125R | D | 78 | (Spain) Jordi Planas | 5 |
| TMR Competicion | Honda | Honda RS125R | D | 91 | (Switzerland) Vincent Braillard | 11 |
| Equipe de France Espoir | Honda | Honda RS125R | D | 72 | (France) Alexis Masbou | 3 |
| TVX Racing | Honda | Honda RS125R | D | 73 | (France) Yannick Deschamps | 3 |
| Big Store RMS | Honda | Honda RS125R | D | 74 | (France) Mathieu Gines | 3 |
| Team Minimoto Portomaggiore | Honda | Honda RS125R | D | 75 | (Italy) Alessio Aldrovandi | 4 |
| Swiss MTR | Honda | Honda RS125R | D | 77 | (Italy) Lorenzo Zanetti | 4 |
| DB Racing | Honda | Honda RS125R | | 79 | (Netherlands) Adri den Bekker | 6 |
| Racing Team Mark Van Kreij | Honda | Honda RS125R | | 80 | (Netherlands) Mark van Kreij | 6 |
| Amici Racing Team | Honda | Honda RS125R | | 82 | (Netherlands) Jarno van der Marel | 6 |
| Bos Tivoli Racing Pevada | Honda | Honda RS125R | | 83 | (Netherlands) Gert-Jan Kok | 6 |
| Bridewell Racing Team | Honda | Honda RS125R | D | 84 | (United Kingdom) Tommy Bridewell | 9 |
| Red Bull Rookies Honda | Honda | Honda RS125R | D | 85 | (United Kingdom) Eugene Laverty | 9 |
| OMV Team Hanusch | Honda | Honda RS125R | D | 87 | (Czech Republic) Patrik Vostárek | 10 |
| Red Bull KTM Junior Team | KTM | KTM 125 FRR | D | 88 | (Austria) Michael Ranseder | 10, 16 |
| SP Tadao Racing Team | Yamaha | Yamaha TZ125 | D | 89 | (Japan) Tomoyoshi Koyama | 10, 12 |
| Team Moto Speed | Honda | Honda RS125R | D | 90 | (Portugal) Carlos Ferreira | 11 |
| Allect Barter Card Racing | Honda | Honda RS125R | D | 92 | (Australia) Bryan Staring | 15 |
| Tel'm Racing | Honda | Honda RS125R | D | 93 | (Australia) Malcolm Esler | 15 |
| Snapon Tools | Honda | Honda RS125R | B | 94 | (Australia) Brent Rigoli | 15 |
| Garage Racing Team | Honda | Honda RS125R | D | 95 | (Japan) Yuki Hatano | 12 |

Key
Regular rider
Wildcard rider
Replacement rider

== Standings ==
=== MotoGP standings ===
Scoring system

Points were awarded to the top fifteen finishers. A rider had to finish the race to earn points.

| Position | **1st** | **2nd** | **3rd** | **4th** | **5th** | **6th** | **7th** | **8th** | **9th** | **10th** | **11th** | **12th** | **13th** | **14th** | **15th** |
| Points | 25 | 20 | 16 | 13 | 11 | 10 | 9 | 8 | 7 | 6 | 5 | 4 | 3 | 2 | 1 |

==== Riders' standings ====
- Rounds marked with a light blue background were under wet race conditions or stopped by rain.
- Riders marked with light blue background were eligible for Rookie of the Year awards.

| Pos | Rider | Bike | Team | RSA (South Africa) | SPA (Spain) | FRA (France) | ITA (Italy) | CAT (Catalonia) | NED (Netherlands) | RIO (Rio de Janeiro (state)) | GER (Germany) | GBR (United Kingdom) | CZE (Czech Republic) | POR (Portugal) | JPN (Japan) | QAT (Qatar) | MAL (Malaysia) | AUS (Australia) | VAL (Valencian Community) | Pts |
|---|---|---|---|---|---|---|---|---|---|---|---|---|---|---|---|---|---|---|---|---|
| 1 | (Italy) Valentino Rossi | Yamaha | Gauloises Fortuna Yamaha | **1** | **4** | 4 | 1 | 1 | **1** | Ret | 4 | **1** | 2 | 1 | 2 | Ret | **1** | 1 | 1 | 304 |
| 2 | (Spain) Sete Gibernau | Honda | Telefónica Movistar Honda MotoGP | 3 | 1 | **1** | **2** | **2** | 2 | Ret | Ret | 3 | **1** | 4 | 6 | 1 | 7 | **2** | 4 | 257 |
| 3 | (Italy) Max Biaggi | Honda | Camel Honda | 2 | 2 | 3 | 3 | 8 | 4 | 2 | **1** | 12 | 3 | Ret | Ret | 6 | 2 | 7 | 2 | 217 |
| 4 | (Brazil) Alex Barros | Honda | Repsol Honda Team | 4 | 3 | 7 | 6 | Ret | Ret | 5 | 2 | 9 | Ret | 3 | 4 | 4 | 3 | 5 | 6 | 165 |
| 5 | (United States) Colin Edwards | Honda | Telefónica Movistar Honda MotoGP | 7 | 7 | 5 | 12 | 5 | 6 | 6 | 5 | 2 | 7 | 9 | Ret | 2 | 11 | 4 | 8 | 157 |
| 6 | (Japan) Makoto Tamada | Honda | Camel Honda | 8 | Ret | 9 | Ret | Ret | 12 | 1 | 6 | 14 | 4 | **2** | **1** | 10 | 5 | 8 | **5** | 150 |
| 7 | (Spain) Carlos Checa | Yamaha | Gauloises Fortuna Yamaha | 10 | 6 | 2 | Ret | 4 | 9 | 10 | Ret | 6 | 6 | 5 | 7 | **Ret** | 9 | 10 | 14 | 117 |
| 8 | (United States) Nicky Hayden | Honda | Repsol Honda Team | 5 | 5 | 11 | Ret | Ret | 5 | 3 | 3 | 4 | Ret | | Ret | 5 | 4 | 6 | Ret | 117 |
| 9 | (Italy) Loris Capirossi | Ducati | Ducati Marlboro Team | 6 | 12 | 10 | 8 | 10 | 8 | 4 | Ret | 7 | 5 | 7 | Ret | Ret | 6 | 3 | 9 | 117 |
| 10 | (Japan) Shinya Nakano | Kawasaki | Kawasaki Racing Team | 12 | 9 | Ret | Ret | 7 | Ret | 9 | 7 | 15 | 12 | 11 | 3 | Ret | 8 | 12 | 7 | 83 |
| 11 | (Spain) Rubén Xaus | Ducati | D'Antin MotoGP | Ret | Ret | 14 | 5 | 6 | 7 | 12 | 11 | 11 | Ret | Ret | 9 | 3 | 13 | 11 | Ret | 77 |
| 12 | (Italy) Marco Melandri | Yamaha | Fortuna Gauloises Tech 3 | 11 | Ret | 6 | 9 | 3 | 3 | 13 | Ret | DNS | 9 | Ret | 5 | Ret | Ret | Ret | Ret | 75 |
| 13 | (Japan) Norifumi Abe | Yamaha | Fortuna Gauloises Tech 3 | 9 | 11 | Ret | 7 | 9 | 11 | 8 | Ret | Ret | 8 | 10 | Ret | 7 | 12 | 17 | 10 | 74 |
| 14 | (Australia) Troy Bayliss | Ducati | Ducati Marlboro Team | 14 | Ret | 8 | 4 | Ret | Ret | Ret | Ret | 5 | Ret | 8 | Ret | Ret | 10 | 9 | 3 | 71 |
| 15 | (Germany) Alex Hofmann | Kawasaki | Kawasaki Racing Team | Ret | 13 | Ret | 14 | 11 | 13 | 11 | 10 | 19 | 13 | 13 | 10 | 9 | Ret | 13 | 11 | 51 |
| 16 | (United States) John Hopkins | Suzuki | Team Suzuki MotoGP | 13 | 15 | Ret | | Ret | 14 | 15 | 9 | 8 | Ret | 6 | Ret | 8 | Ret | 15 | 12 | 45 |
| 17 | (United Kingdom) Neil Hodgson | Ducati | D'Antin MotoGP | Ret | Ret | Ret | 11 | 12 | 10 | 16 | 13 | 10 | 11 | Ret | 8 | Ret | Ret | 18 | 15 | 38 |
| 18 | (United States) Kenny Roberts Jr. | Suzuki | Team Suzuki MotoGP | Ret | 8 | 12 | Ret | 17 | 16 | **7** | 8 | 17 | 10 | 14 | Ret | | | | | 37 |
| 19 | (United Kingdom) Jeremy McWilliams | Aprilia | MS Aprilia Racing | 16 | Ret | 13 | 16 | DNS | 15 | 14 | 12 | 16 | 14 | 12 | 12 | Ret | 15 | 14 | 13 | 26 |
| 20 | (United Kingdom) Shane Byrne | Aprilia | MS Aprilia Racing | 15 | Ret | DNS | 10 | 13 | Ret | 17 | 14 | 13 | DNS | | 13 | | | | | 18 |
| 21 | (Japan) Nobuatsu Aoki | Proton KR | Proton Team KR | 17 | 14 | 17 | 13 | 15 | Ret | 18 | Ret | 18 | 15 | 15 | 14 | Ret | 17 | 19 | 18 | 10 |
| 22 | (Italy) Michel Fabrizio | Harris WCM | WCM | 18 | 10 | 16 | 15 | 16 | Ret | | 15 | 20 | 17 | | | | | | | 8 |
| 22 | (Italy) Michel Fabrizio | Aprilia | MS Aprilia Racing | | | | | | | | | | | Ret | | | | | | 8 |
| 23 | (Japan) Yukio Kagayama | Suzuki | Team Suzuki MotoGP | | | | | | | | | | | | | 11 | 14 | | | 7 |
| 24 | (France) Olivier Jacque | Moriwaki | Moriwaki Racing | | | | | | | | | | | | 11 | | | | Ret | 5 |
| 25 | (United Kingdom) James Haydon | Proton KR | Proton Team KR | | | | | | | | | | | | | 12 | Ret | 20 | | 4 |
| 26 | (United Kingdom) James Ellison | Harris WCM | WCM | | | | | | | | | | Ret | 16 | | 13 | 18 | 22 | 19 | 3 |
| 27 | (Australia) Andrew Pitt | Moriwaki | Moriwaki Racing | | | | 17 | 14 | | | | | 16 | | | | | | | 2 |
| 28 | (Japan) Youichi Ui | Harris WCM | WCM | | | | | | | | | | | | 15 | DNQ | 19 | 21 | | 1 |
| 29 | (United States) Kurtis Roberts | Proton KR | Proton Team KR | WD | Ret | 15 | Ret | Ret | Ret | 19 | Ret | Ret | DNS | | | | | | DNS | 1 |
| | (Australia) Garry McCoy | Aprilia | MS Aprilia Racing | | | | | | | | | | | | | | 16 | Ret | 16 | 0 |
| | (United Kingdom) Chris Burns | Harris WCM | WCM | | DNQ | Ret | Ret | 18 | 17 | 20 | 16 | Ret | | DNS | | | | | Ret | 0 |
| | (Spain) Gregorio Lavilla | Suzuki | Team Suzuki MotoGP | | | | | Ret | | | | | Ret | | | | | 16 | 17 | 0 |
| | (Spain) José David de Gea | Harris WCM | WCM | | | | | | | Ret | | | | | | | | | | 0 |
| | (Japan) Tohru Ukawa | Honda | HRC | | | | | | | | | | | | Ret | | | | | 0 |
| Pos | Rider | Bike | Team | RSA (South Africa) | SPA (Spain) | FRA (France) | ITA (Italy) | CAT (Catalonia) | NED (Netherlands) | RIO (Rio de Janeiro (state)) | GER (Germany) | GBR (United Kingdom) | CZE (Czech Republic) | POR (Portugal) | JPN (Japan) | QAT (Qatar) | MAL (Malaysia) | AUS (Australia) | VAL (Valencian Community) | Pts |

| Colour | Result |
|---|---|
| Gold | Winner |
| Silver | Second place |
| Bronze | Third place |
| Green | Points classification |
| Blue | Non-points classification |
| Blue | Non-classified finish (NC) |
| Purple | Retired, not classified (Ret) |
| Red | Did not qualify (DNQ) |
| Red | Did not pre-qualify (DNPQ) |
| Black | Disqualified (DSQ) |
| White | Did not start (DNS) |
| White | Withdrew (WD) |
| White | Race cancelled (C) |
| Blank | Did not practice (DNP) |
| Blank | Did not arrive (DNA) |
| Blank | Excluded (EX) |

**Bold** – Pole position
Italics – Fastest lap

==== Constructors' standings ====
- Each constructor got the same number of points as their best placed rider in each race.
- Rounds marked with a light blue background were under wet race conditions or stopped by rain.

| Pos | Constructor | RSA (South Africa) | SPA (Spain) | FRA (France) | ITA (Italy) | CAT (Catalonia) | NED (Netherlands) | RIO (Rio de Janeiro (state)) | GER (Germany) | GBR (United Kingdom) | CZE (Czech Republic) | POR (Portugal) | JPN (Japan) | QAT (Qatar) | MAL (Malaysia) | AUS (Australia) | VAL (Valencian Community) | Pts |
|---|---|---|---|---|---|---|---|---|---|---|---|---|---|---|---|---|---|---|
| 1 | (Japan) Honda | 2 | 1 | 1 | 2 | 2 | 2 | 1 | 1 | 2 | 1 | 2 | 1 | 1 | 2 | 2 | 2 | 355 |
| 2 | (Japan) Yamaha | 1 | 4 | 2 | 1 | 1 | 1 | 8 | 4 | 1 | 2 | 1 | 2 | 7 | 1 | 1 | 1 | 328 |
| 3 | (Italy) Ducati | 5 | 12 | 8 | 4 | 6 | 7 | 4 | 11 | 5 | 5 | 7 | 8 | 3 | 6 | 3 | 3 | 169 |
| 4 | (Japan) Kawasaki | 12 | 9 | Ret | 14 | 7 | 13 | 9 | 7 | 15 | 12 | 11 | 3 | 9 | 8 | 12 | 7 | 95 |
| 5 | (Japan) Suzuki | 13 | 8 | 12 | Ret | 17 | 14 | 7 | 8 | 8 | 10 | 6 | Ret | 8 | 14 | 15 | 12 | 73 |
| 6 | (Italy) Aprilia | 15 | Ret | 13 | 10 | 13 | 15 | 14 | 12 | 13 | 14 | 12 | 12 | Ret | 15 | 14 | 13 | 39 |
| 7 | (Malaysia) / (United States) Proton KR | 17 | 14 | 15 | 13 | 15 | Ret | 18 | Ret | 18 | 15 | 15 | 14 | 12 | 17 | 19 | 18 | 15 |
| 8 | (United Kingdom) Harris WCM | 18 | 10 | 16 | 15 | 16 | 17 | 20 | 15 | 20 | 17 | 15 | DNS | 13 | 18 | 22 | 19 | 12 |
| 9 | (Japan) Moriwaki | | | | 17 | 14 | | | | | 16 | | 11 | | | | Ret | 7 |
| Pos | Constructor | RSA (South Africa) | SPA (Spain) | FRA (France) | ITA (Italy) | CAT (Catalonia) | NED (Netherlands) | RIO (Rio de Janeiro (state)) | GER (Germany) | GBR (United Kingdom) | CZE (Czech Republic) | POR (Portugal) | JPN (Japan) | QAT (Qatar) | MAL (Malaysia) | AUS (Australia) | VAL (Valencian Community) | Pts |

==== Teams' standings ====
- Each team got the total points scored by their two riders, including replacement riders. In one rider team, only the points scored by that rider was counted. Wildcard riders did not score points.
- Rounds marked with a light blue background were under wet race conditions or stopped by rain.

| Pos | Team | Bike No. | RSA (South Africa) | SPA (Spain) | FRA (France) | ITA (Italy) | CAT (Catalonia) | NED (Netherlands) | RIO (Rio de Janeiro (state)) | GER (Germany) | GBR (United Kingdom) | CZE (Czech Republic) | POR (Portugal) | JPN (Japan) | QAT (Qatar) | MAL (Malaysia) | AUS (Australia) | VAL (Valencian Community) | Pts |
|---|---|---|---|---|---|---|---|---|---|---|---|---|---|---|---|---|---|---|---|
| 1 | (Japan) Gauloises Fortuna Yamaha | 7 | 10 | 6 | 2 | Ret | 4 | 9 | 10 | Ret | 6 | 6 | 5 | 7 | **Ret** | 9 | 10 | 14 | 421 |
| 1 | (Japan) Gauloises Fortuna Yamaha | 46 | **1** | **4** | 4 | 1 | 1 | **1** | Ret | 4 | **1** | 2 | 1 | 2 | Ret | **1** | 1 | 1 | 421 |
| 2 | (Italy) Telefónica Movistar Honda MotoGP | 15 | 3 | 1 | **1** | **2** | **2** | 2 | Ret | Ret | 3 | **1** | 4 | 6 | 1 | 7 | **2** | 4 | 414 |
| 2 | (Italy) Telefónica Movistar Honda MotoGP | 45 | 7 | 7 | 5 | 12 | 5 | 6 | 6 | 5 | 2 | 7 | 9 | Ret | 2 | 11 | 4 | 8 | 414 |
| 3 | (Spain) Camel Honda | 3 | 2 | 2 | 3 | 3 | 8 | 4 | 2 | **1** | 12 | 3 | Ret | Ret | 6 | 2 | 7 | 2 | 367 |
| 3 | (Spain) Camel Honda | 6 | 8 | Ret | 9 | Ret | Ret | 12 | 1 | 6 | 14 | 4 | **2** | **1** | 10 | 5 | 8 | **5** | 367 |
| 4 | (Japan) Repsol Honda Team | 4 | 4 | 3 | 7 | 6 | Ret | Ret | 5 | 2 | 9 | Ret | 3 | 4 | 4 | 3 | 5 | 6 | 282 |
| 4 | (Japan) Repsol Honda Team | 69 | 5 | 5 | 11 | Ret | Ret | 5 | 3 | 3 | 4 | Ret | | Ret | 5 | 4 | 6 | Ret | 282 |
| 5 | (Italy) Ducati Marlboro Team | 12 | 14 | Ret | 8 | 4 | Ret | Ret | Ret | Ret | 5 | Ret | 8 | Ret | Ret | 10 | 9 | 3 | 188 |
| 5 | (Italy) Ducati Marlboro Team | 65 | 6 | 12 | 10 | 8 | 10 | 8 | 4 | Ret | 7 | 5 | 7 | Ret | Ret | 6 | 3 | 9 | 188 |
| 6 | (France) Fortuna Gauloises Tech 3 | 17 | 9 | 11 | Ret | 7 | 9 | 11 | 8 | Ret | Ret | 8 | 10 | Ret | 7 | 12 | 17 | 10 | 149 |
| 6 | (France) Fortuna Gauloises Tech 3 | 33 | 11 | Ret | 6 | 9 | 3 | 3 | 13 | Ret | DNS | 9 | Ret | 5 | Ret | Ret | Ret | Ret | 149 |
| 7 | (Japan) Kawasaki Racing Team | 56 | 12 | 9 | Ret | Ret | 7 | Ret | 9 | 7 | 15 | 12 | 11 | 3 | Ret | 8 | 12 | 7 | 134 |
| 7 | (Japan) Kawasaki Racing Team | 66 | Ret | 13 | Ret | 14 | 11 | 13 | 11 | 10 | 19 | 13 | 13 | 10 | 9 | Ret | 13 | 11 | 134 |
| 8 | (Spain) D'Antin MotoGP | 11 | Ret | Ret | 14 | 5 | 6 | 7 | 12 | 11 | 11 | Ret | Ret | 9 | 3 | 13 | 11 | Ret | 115 |
| 8 | (Spain) D'Antin MotoGP | 50 | Ret | Ret | Ret | 11 | 12 | 10 | 16 | 13 | 10 | 11 | Ret | 8 | Ret | Ret | 18 | 15 | 115 |
| 9 | (Japan) Team Suzuki MotoGP | 10 | Ret | 8 | 12 | Ret | 17 | 16 | **7** | 8 | 17 | 10 | 14 | Ret | | | | | 89 |
| 9 | (Japan) Team Suzuki MotoGP | 21 | 13 | 15 | Ret | | Ret | 14 | 15 | 9 | 8 | Ret | 6 | Ret | 8 | Ret | 15 | 12 | 89 |
| 9 | (Japan) Team Suzuki MotoGP | 32 | | | | | | | | | | | | | | | 16 | 17 | 89 |
| 9 | (Japan) Team Suzuki MotoGP | 71 | | | | | | | | | | | | | 11 | 14 | | | 89 |
| 10 | (Italy) MS Aprilia Racing | 24 | | | | | | | | | | | | | | 16 | Ret | 16 | 44 |
| 10 | (Italy) MS Aprilia Racing | 67 | 15 | Ret | DNS | 10 | 13 | Ret | 17 | 14 | 13 | DNS | | 13 | | | | | 44 |
| 10 | (Italy) MS Aprilia Racing | 84 | | | | | | | | | | | Ret | | | | | | 44 |
| 10 | (Italy) MS Aprilia Racing | 99 | 16 | Ret | 13 | 16 | DNS | 15 | 14 | 12 | 16 | 14 | 12 | 12 | Ret | 15 | 14 | 13 | 44 |
| 11 | (Malaysia) / (United States) Proton Team KR | 9 | 17 | 14 | 17 | 13 | 15 | Ret | 18 | Ret | 18 | 15 | 15 | 14 | Ret | 17 | 19 | 18 | 15 |
| 11 | (Malaysia) / (United States) Proton Team KR | 36 | | | | | | | | | | | | | 12 | Ret | 20 | | 15 |
| 11 | (Malaysia) / (United States) Proton Team KR | 80 | WD | Ret | 15 | Ret | Ret | Ret | 19 | Ret | Ret | DNS | | | | | | DNS | 15 |
| 12 | (United Kingdom) WCM | 35 | | DNQ | Ret | Ret | 18 | 17 | 20 | 16 | Ret | | DNS | | | | | Ret | 12 |
| 12 | (United Kingdom) WCM | 41 | | | | | | | | | | | | 15 | DNQ | 19 | 21 | | 12 |
| 12 | (United Kingdom) WCM | 52 | | | | | | | Ret | | | | | | | | | | 12 |
| 12 | (United Kingdom) WCM | 77 | | | | | | | | | | Ret | 16 | | 13 | 18 | 22 | 19 | 12 |
| 12 | (United Kingdom) WCM | 84 | 18 | 10 | 16 | 15 | 16 | Ret | | 15 | 20 | 17 | | | | | | | 12 |
| Pos | Team | Bike No. | RSA (South Africa) | SPA (Spain) | FRA (France) | ITA (Italy) | CAT (Catalonia) | NED (Netherlands) | RIO (Rio de Janeiro (state)) | GER (Germany) | GBR (United Kingdom) | CZE (Czech Republic) | POR (Portugal) | JPN (Japan) | QAT (Qatar) | MAL (Malaysia) | AUS (Australia) | VAL (Valencian Community) | Pts |

=== 250cc standings ===
Scoring system

Points were awarded to the top fifteen finishers. A rider had to finish the race to earn points.

| Position | **1st** | **2nd** | **3rd** | **4th** | **5th** | **6th** | **7th** | **8th** | **9th** | **10th** | **11th** | **12th** | **13th** | **14th** | **15th** |
| Points | 25 | 20 | 16 | 13 | 11 | 10 | 9 | 8 | 7 | 6 | 5 | 4 | 3 | 2 | 1 |

==== Riders' standings ====
- Rounds marked with a light blue background were under wet race conditions or stopped by rain.
- Riders marked with light blue background were eligible for Rookie of the Year awards.

| Pos | Rider | Bike | RSA (South Africa) | SPA (Spain) | FRA (France) | ITA (Italy) | CAT (Catalonia) | NED (Netherlands) | RIO (Rio de Janeiro (state)) | GER (Germany) | GBR (United Kingdom) | CZE (Czech Republic) | POR (Portugal) | JPN (Japan) | QAT (Qatar) | MAL (Malaysia) | AUS (Australia) | VAL (Valencian Community) | Pts |
|---|---|---|---|---|---|---|---|---|---|---|---|---|---|---|---|---|---|---|---|
| 1 | (Spain) Daniel Pedrosa | Honda | 1 | Ret | **1** | 2 | 2 | 2 | 2 | 1 | 1 | 3 | **4** | **1** | 2 | 1 | 4 | **1** | 317 |
| 2 | (Argentina) Sebastián Porto | Aprilia | 3 | **7** | Ret | **1** | 4 | **1** | **Ret** | **2** | 2 | **1** | 2 | 4 | **1** | **2** | **1** | Ret | 256 |
| 3 | (France) Randy de Puniet | Aprilia | **2** | 2 | 2 | 4 | **1** | 4 | 8 | 5 | 3 | 2 | 3 | 11 | Ret | 5 | Ret | 3 | 214 |
| 4 | (Spain) Toni Elías | Honda | 8 | 12 | 3 | 6 | 3 | 3 | 3 | 22 | Ret | 5 | 1 | 2 | 6 | 3 | 5 | 2 | 199 |
| 5 | (San Marino) Alex de Angelis | Aprilia | 5 | 6 | 5 | 8 | Ret | 5 | 4 | 3 | **4** | Ret | 5 | 6 | Ret | 4 | 2 | Ret | 147 |
| 6 | (Japan) Hiroshi Aoyama | Honda | 11 | Ret | 4 | 9 | 6 | 10 | 6 | 4 | 9 | 7 | 9 | 3 | 3 | Ret | 7 | Ret | 128 |
| 7 | (Spain) Fonsi Nieto | Aprilia | 7 | 3 | 7 | 5 | 5 | 8 | 5 | 8 | 5 | Ret | Ret | Ret | 5 | 7 | Ret | 6 | 124 |
| 8 | (Italy) Roberto Rolfo | Honda | 9 | 1 | Ret | 7 | Ret | 9 | 7 | 6 | DNS | 6 | 10 | 7 | 7 | Ret | 10 | 7 | 116 |
| 9 | (San Marino) Manuel Poggiali | Aprilia | 4 | Ret | Ret | 3 | Ret | 7 | 1 | Ret | Ret | 9 | 7 | 17 | WD | | 3 | Ret | 95 |
| 10 | (Italy) Franco Battaini | Aprilia | 10 | Ret | 8 | 12 | 10 | 16 | 10 | 9 | 7 | Ret | 12 | 9 | 4 | 6 | Ret | 4 | 93 |
| 11 | (Australia) Anthony West | Aprilia | 16 | 4 | 6 | 10 | 9 | 6 | Ret | 7 | 6 | 4 | 6 | Ret | Ret | Ret | DNS | | 88 |
| 12 | (Spain) Alex Debón | Honda | 6 | 5 | 9 | 15 | 8 | 12 | 9 | 11 | Ret | Ret | 8 | 10 | 8 | Ret | 11 | 14 | 82 |
| 13 | (United Kingdom) Chaz Davies | Aprilia | Ret | Ret | 12 | 17 | 13 | 15 | 13 | 12 | Ret | 8 | 16 | Ret | 16 | 9 | 6 | 5 | 51 |
| 14 | (France) Sylvain Guintoli | Aprilia | 15 | Ret | Ret | 13 | 7 | Ret | 12 | 10 | 10 | Ret | Ret | 19 | 11 | Ret | 8 | Ret | 42 |
| 15 | (Japan) Naoki Matsudo | Yamaha | 18 | 10 | 14 | 16 | 14 | 13 | 14 | 16 | 8 | 16 | Ret | 13 | Ret | 10 | 15 | 8 | 41 |
| 16 | (France) Hugo Marchand | Aprilia | 19 | 13 | 17 | Ret | Ret | 18 | 11 | Ret | 13 | 12 | 19 | 14 | 9 | 8 | 12 | DNS | 36 |
| 17 | (Spain) Héctor Faubel | Aprilia | 12 | 17 | 13 | 14 | 16 | 17 | DNS | | Ret | 10 | 11 | 15 | Ret | 13 | 16 | 9 | 31 |
| 18 | (Italy) Alex Baldolini | Aprilia | Ret | 11 | 15 | Ret | 12 | 11 | Ret | Ret | 12 | Ret | Ret | Ret | 18 | 11 | Ret | 10 | 30 |
| 19 | (Spain) Joan Olivé | Aprilia | 17 | 20 | 10 | 11 | Ret | Ret | Ret | 13 | 11 | 15 | 18 | Ret | 10 | 18 | Ret | 15 | 27 |
| 20 | (Czech Republic) Jakub Smrž | Honda | 21 | Ret | 11 | Ret | 15 | Ret | Ret | 15 | 15 | 14 | 14 | Ret | 17 | 14 | 13 | 13 | 20 |
| 21 | (France) Arnaud Vincent | Aprilia | 13 | 8 | Ret | Ret | | Ret | 19 | Ret | Ret | Ret | Ret | Ret | | | | 12 | 15 |
| 22 | (Sweden) Johan Stigefelt | Aprilia | 23 | 14 | Ret | 19 | Ret | 20 | Ret | 20 | 14 | 17 | 20 | Ret | 14 | 15 | 9 | 17 | 14 |
| 23 | (Germany) Dirk Heidolf | Aprilia | 14 | 16 | 16 | Ret | Ret | | 15 | 18 | 17 | 11 | 15 | 21 | Ret | 12 | Ret | 18 | 13 |
| 24 | (France) Eric Bataille | Honda | Ret | Ret | Ret | Ret | 11 | 14 | Ret | 14 | | Ret | 13 | Ret | | | | | 12 |
| 25 | (Japan) Yuki Takahashi | Honda | | | | | | | | | | | | 5 | | | | | 11 |
| 26 | (Japan) Shuhei Aoyama | Honda | | | | | | | | | | | | 8 | | | | | 8 |
| 27 | (Spain) José David de Gea | Honda | | | | | | | | | 16 | | | | 15 | 17 | 14 | 11 | 8 |
| 28 | (France) Grégory Lefort | Aprilia | 25 | 9 | 20 | 18 | Ret | Ret | 18 | Ret | | | | | | | | | 7 |
| 29 | (France) Erwan Nigon | Aprilia | 20 | | 18 | Ret | 17 | Ret | 17 | 19 | Ret | Ret | 21 | 22 | 12 | Ret | Ret | DNS | 4 |
| 30 | (Japan) Yuzo Fujioka | Honda | | | | | | | | | | | | 12 | | | | | 4 |
| 31 | (Japan) Taro Sekiguchi | Yamaha | 22 | 15 | 21 | 21 | 18 | 19 | 20 | 17 | 19 | Ret | 17 | 18 | 13 | Ret | Ret | Ret | 4 |
| 32 | (France) Grégory Leblanc | Aprilia | | 21 | 22 | | | | | | | 13 | 22 | | Ret | 19 | 17 | 20 | 3 |
| | (Germany) Klaus Nöhles | Honda | | | | | | 21 | 16 | 21 | 18 | Ret | 23 | Ret | 19 | WD | | | 0 |
| | (Spain) Álvaro Molina | Aprilia | | Ret | | | | | | | | | | | | | | 16 | 0 |
| | (Japan) Choujun Kameya | Honda | | | | | | | | | | | | 16 | | | | | 0 |
| | (Italy) Marcellino Lucchi | Aprilia | | | | | | | | | | | | | | 16 | | | 0 |
| | (Czech Republic) Radomil Rous | Aprilia | | 19 | Ret | | | | | | | | | | | | | | 0 |
| | (Czech Republic) Radomil Rous | Yamaha | | | | | | | | | 21 | 18 | Ret | Ret | Ret | 20 | 19 | 19 | 0 |
| | (Italy) Jarno Ronzoni | Yamaha | | 18 | | Ret | | | | | | | | | | | | | 0 |
| | (Italy) Jarno Ronzoni | Honda | | | | | 19 | | | | | | | | | | | | 0 |
| | (Italy) Jarno Ronzoni | Aprilia | | | | | | | | | | | | | | | | 22 | 0 |
| | (Australia) Joshua Waters | Honda | | | | | | | | | | | | | | | 18 | | 0 |
| | (Germany) Christian Gemmel | Honda | Ret | Ret | 19 | 20 | | | | | | | | | | | | | 0 |
| | (Netherlands) Henk van de Lagemaat | Aprilia | | | | | | | | | | 19 | | | | | | | 0 |
| | (France) David Fouloi | Aprilia | | | | | 20 | | | | | | | | | | | | 0 |
| | (United Kingdom) Lee Dickinson | Honda | | | | | | | | | 20 | | | | | | | | 0 |
| | (Japan) Katsuyuki Nakasuga | Yamaha | | | | | | | | | | | | 20 | | | | | 0 |
| | (Netherlands) Hans Smees | Honda | | | | | | DNQ | | | | | | | | | | 21 | 0 |
| | (Spain) Iván Silva | Aprilia | | | | | | 22 | | | | | | | | | | | 0 |
| | (Italy) Max Sabbatani | Yamaha | 24 | Ret | DNQ | Ret | DNS | DNQ | Ret | Ret | DNS | | | | | | | | 0 |
| | (Hungary) Gergő Talmácsi | Yamaha | | | | | | | | | | Ret | DNQ | DNQ | DNQ | DNQ | DNQ | DNQ | 0 |
| | (Sweden) Frederik Watz | Yamaha | | | | | | | | | DNS | | | | | | | | 0 |
| | (Sweden) Frederik Watz | Honda | | | | | | | | | | | | | | | | Ret | 0 |
| | (France) Marc-Antoine Scaccia | Yamaha | | | DNQ | | | | | | | | | | | | | | 0 |
| | (France) Samuel Aubry | Honda | | | DNQ | | | | | | | | | | | | | | 0 |
| | (France) Vincent Eisen | Honda | | | DNQ | | | | | | | | | | | | | | 0 |
| | (Spain) José Luis Cardoso | Yamaha | | | | | DNQ | | | | | | | | | | | | 0 |
| | (Netherlands) Emile Litjens | Aprilia | | | | | | DNQ | | | | | | | | | | | 0 |
| | (Netherlands) Jan Roelofs | Yamaha | | | | | | DNQ | | | | | | | | | | | 0 |
| | (Netherlands) Patrick Lakerveld | Yamaha | | | | | | DNQ | | | | | | | | | | | 0 |
| | (Netherlands) Randy Gevers | Aprilia | | | | | | DNQ | | | | | | | | | | | 0 |
| | (United Kingdom) Bruce Dunn | Honda | | | | | | | | | DNQ | | | | | | | | 0 |
| | (United Kingdom) Tony Campbell | Yamaha | | | | | | | | | DNQ | | | | | | | | 0 |
| | (Italy) Valerio Anghetti | Aprilia | | | | | | | | | | DNQ | | | | | | | 0 |
| | (Australia) Ben Ried | Yamaha | | | | | | | | | | | | | | | DNQ | | 0 |
| | (Australia) Mark Rowling | Yamaha | | | | | | | | | | | | | | | DNQ | | 0 |
| | (Australia) Peter Taplin | Honda | | | | | | | | | | | | | | | DNQ | | 0 |
| Pos | Rider | Bike | RSA (South Africa) | SPA (Spain) | FRA (France) | ITA (Italy) | CAT (Catalonia) | NED (Netherlands) | RIO (Rio de Janeiro (state)) | GER (Germany) | GBR (United Kingdom) | CZE (Czech Republic) | POR (Portugal) | JPN (Japan) | QAT (Qatar) | MAL (Malaysia) | AUS (Australia) | VAL (Valencian Community) | Pts |

| Colour | Result |
|---|---|
| Gold | Winner |
| Silver | Second place |
| Bronze | Third place |
| Green | Points classification |
| Blue | Non-points classification |
| Blue | Non-classified finish (NC) |
| Purple | Retired, not classified (Ret) |
| Red | Did not qualify (DNQ) |
| Red | Did not pre-qualify (DNPQ) |
| Black | Disqualified (DSQ) |
| White | Did not start (DNS) |
| White | Withdrew (WD) |
| White | Race cancelled (C) |
| Blank | Did not practice (DNP) |
| Blank | Did not arrive (DNA) |
| Blank | Excluded (EX) |

**Bold** – Pole position
Italics – Fastest lap

==== Constructors' standings ====
- Each constructor got the same number of points as their best placed rider in each race.
- Rounds marked with a light blue background were under wet race conditions or stopped by rain.

| Pos | Constructor | RSA (South Africa) | SPA (Spain) | FRA (France) | ITA (Italy) | CAT (Catalonia) | NED (Netherlands) | RIO (Rio de Janeiro (state)) | GER (Germany) | GBR (United Kingdom) | CZE (Czech Republic) | POR (Portugal) | JPN (Japan) | QAT (Qatar) | MAL (Malaysia) | AUS (Australia) | VAL (Valencian Community) | Pts |
|---|---|---|---|---|---|---|---|---|---|---|---|---|---|---|---|---|---|---|
| 1 | (Japan) Honda | 1 | 1 | 1 | 2 | 2 | 2 | 2 | 1 | 1 | 3 | 1 | 1 | 2 | 1 | 4 | 1 | 354 |
| 2 | (Italy) Aprilia | 2 | 2 | 2 | 1 | 1 | 1 | 1 | 2 | 2 | 1 | 2 | 4 | 1 | 2 | 1 | 3 | 344 |
| 3 | (Japan) Yamaha | 18 | 10 | 14 | 16 | 14 | 13 | 14 | 16 | 8 | 16 | 17 | 13 | 13 | 10 | 15 | 8 | 44 |
| Pos | Constructor | RSA (South Africa) | SPA (Spain) | FRA (France) | ITA (Italy) | CAT (Catalonia) | NED (Netherlands) | RIO (Rio de Janeiro (state)) | GER (Germany) | GBR (United Kingdom) | CZE (Czech Republic) | POR (Portugal) | JPN (Japan) | QAT (Qatar) | MAL (Malaysia) | AUS (Australia) | VAL (Valencian Community) | Pts |

=== 125cc standings ===
Scoring system

Points were awarded to the top fifteen finishers. A rider had to finish the race to earn points.

| Position | **1st** | **2nd** | **3rd** | **4th** | **5th** | **6th** | **7th** | **8th** | **9th** | **10th** | **11th** | **12th** | **13th** | **14th** | **15th** |
| Points | 25 | 20 | 16 | 13 | 11 | 10 | 9 | 8 | 7 | 6 | 5 | 4 | 3 | 2 | 1 |

==== Riders' standings ====
- Rounds marked with a light blue background were under wet race conditions or stopped by rain.
- Riders marked with light blue background were eligible for Rookie of the Year awards.

| Pos | Rider | Bike | RSA (South Africa) | SPA (Spain) | FRA (France) | ITA (Italy) | CAT (Catalonia) | NED (Netherlands) | RIO (Rio de Janeiro (state)) | GER (Germany) | GBR (United Kingdom) | CZE (Czech Republic) | POR (Portugal) | JPN (Japan) | QAT (Qatar) | MAL (Malaysia) | AUS (Australia) | VAL (Valencian Community) | Pts |
|---|---|---|---|---|---|---|---|---|---|---|---|---|---|---|---|---|---|---|---|
| 1 | (Italy) Andrea Dovizioso | Honda | **1** | 4 | **1** | 4 | 2 | 4 | 3 | **4** | **1** | 2 | **Ret** | **1** | 2 | **2** | 1 | **2** | 293 |
| 2 | (Spain) Héctor Barberá | Aprilia | 10 | 3 | 5 | 3 | 1 | 6 | **1** | 2 | Ret | 7 | 1 | Ret | 12 | Ret | 6 | 1 | 202 |
| 3 | (Italy) Roberto Locatelli | Aprilia | 2 | 8 | 2 | 1 | Ret | 2 | 4 | 1 | Ret | 3 | 9 | 14 | 20 | 4 | **4** | 6 | 192 |
| 4 | (Spain) Jorge Lorenzo | Derbi | 16 | Ret | 3 | 10 | **5** | 1 | Ret | 6 | 3 | 1 | 3 | 7 | **1** | Ret | 2 | Ret | 179 |
| 5 | (Australia) Casey Stoner | KTM | 3 | 5 | 8 | 2 | 4 | **3** | 2 | DNS | | Ret | Ret | Ret | Ret | 1 | 3 | Ret | 145 |
| 6 | (Spain) Pablo Nieto | Aprilia | 4 | 9 | 7 | 6 | 3 | 8 | 7 | 3 | Ret | 4 | 4 | Ret | 6 | Ret | 15 | 4 | 138 |
| 7 | (Spain) Álvaro Bautista | Aprilia | 9 | Ret | 9 | Ret | 6 | 16 | 9 | 7 | 2 | 13 | 5 | Ret | 3 | 3 | 9 | 3 | 129 |
| 8 | (Germany) Steve Jenkner | Aprilia | 8 | 2 | 10 | **7** | 12 | 5 | 20 | 11 | 6 | 6 | Ret | 5 | 11 | 10 | 5 | 10 | 122 |
| 9 | (Italy) Mirko Giansanti | Aprilia | 7 | 10 | 4 | 5 | 10 | 9 | 5 | 8 | Ret | 8 | Ret | 4 | 10 | Ret | 13 | 12 | 105 |
| 10 | (Finland) Mika Kallio | KTM | 12 | Ret | 6 | Ret | 9 | Ret | 8 | 5 | 4 | Ret | 2 | Ret | 4 | Ret | Ret | Ret | 86 |
| 11 | (Italy) Marco Simoncelli | Aprilia | Ret | **1** | Ret | Ret | 7 | 7 | 6 | 10 | Ret | **19** | 6 | 6 | Ret | Ret | | | 79 |
| 12 | (Italy) Gino Borsoi | Aprilia | 6 | 19 | 11 | 9 | Ret | Ret | 17 | Ret | 9 | 5 | 15 | 11 | 8 | 9 | 7 | 7 | 79 |
| 13 | (Italy) Simone Corsi | Honda | 14 | 12 | 15 | 11 | Ret | 18 | 13 | 12 | 5 | 9 | Ret | 3 | Ret | Ret | 16 | 8 | 61 |
| 14 | (Spain) Julián Simón | Honda | 11 | 11 | 13 | 20 | 14 | 19 | 14 | 9 | 8 | 10 | WD | | 7 | 6 | 20 | 13 | 60 |
| 15 | (Italy) Mattia Pasini | Aprilia | 13 | Ret | 12 | 8 | 11 | 11 | 10 | 20 | Ret | 14 | 17 | Ret | 9 | 7 | 18 | 11 | 54 |
| 16 | (Italy) Fabrizio Lai | Gilera | 21 | 13 | 20 | Ret | DNS | DNS | Ret | Ret | 14 | 15 | 12 | 2 | 5 | 5 | Ret | 15 | 53 |
| 17 | (Hungary) Gábor Talmácsi | Malaguti | Ret | Ret | 16 | 13 | 17 | 17 | 19 | 16 | 13 | Ret | 7 | 8 | Ret | 8 | 11 | 9 | 43 |
| 18 | (France) Mike Di Meglio | Aprilia | 5 | Ret | Ret | Ret | 8 | 12 | 12 | Ret | 15 | 24 | 11 | Ret | DNQ | 17 | 8 | | 41 |
| 19 | (Spain) Sergio Gadea | Aprilia | 23 | 17 | 22 | 23 | 21 | 21 | Ret | 14 | 16 | Ret | 13 | 13 | 18 | 12 | 10 | 5 | 29 |
| 20 | (Italy) Andrea Ballerini | Aprilia | Ret | 6 | Ret | 12 | 20 | 20 | 11 | | | 12 | Ret | Ret | 14 | 14 | 14 | Ret | 29 |
| 21 | (Czech Republic) Lukáš Pešek | Honda | 20 | Ret | 14 | 15 | Ret | Ret | 15 | 17 | 12 | Ret | 8 | Ret | 17 | Ret | 12 | Ret | 20 |
| 22 | (Japan) Youichi Ui | Aprilia | 15 | 7 | Ret | 22 | 18 | Ret | Ret | Ret | 7 | | | | | | | | 19 |
| 23 | (Italy) Gioele Pellino | Aprilia | Ret | Ret | 17 | Ret | 13 | 13 | 16 | 13 | 10 | Ret | Ret | 16 | 15 | Ret | 17 | 20 | 16 |
| 24 | (Italy) Stefano Perugini | Gilera | 17 | 23 | Ret | Ret | 22 | 14 | 22 | 15 | 11 | 17 | 10 | Ret | 16 | Ret | Ret | Ret | 14 |
| 25 | (Switzerland) Thomas Lüthi | Honda | Ret | Ret | Ret | Ret | | | | 18 | 18 | 18 | 16 | 12 | 13 | 11 | 19 | 14 | 14 |
| 26 | (Germany) Dario Giuseppetti | Honda | 19 | 15 | 19 | 14 | 16 | Ret | | | | 20 | 14 | Ret | 19 | 13 | 22 | Ret | 8 |
| 27 | (Japan) Tomoyoshi Koyama | Yamaha | | | | | | | | | | 22 | | 9 | | | | | 7 |
| 28 | (Japan) Toshihisa Kuzuhara | Honda | | | | | | | | | | | | 10 | | 15 | | | 7 |
| 29 | (Hungary) Imre Tóth | Aprilia | 22 | 26 | 21 | 16 | 19 | 10 | 18 | Ret | 19 | Ret | Ret | Ret | 25 | 18 | 21 | 21 | 6 |
| 30 | (Denmark) Robbin Harms | Honda | 18 | Ret | Ret | Ret | | | | 19 | 17 | 11 | Ret | DNS | | | | | 5 |
| 31 | (Spain) Jordi Carchano | Aprilia | 27 | 14 | 24 | 21 | 23 | DNQ | Ret | 24 | DNS | Ret | 20 | 19 | 22 | 16 | 28 | 27 | 2 |
| 32 | (Spain) Ángel Rodríguez | Derbi | Ret | Ret | 18 | Ret | 15 | 15 | Ret | Ret | Ret | Ret | Ret | Ret | Ret | Ret | Ret | Ret | 2 |
| 33 | (Finland) Vesa Kallio | Aprilia | 24 | 18 | 26 | Ret | 27 | 23 | 21 | 22 | Ret | 23 | 18 | 15 | Ret | Ret | 23 | 23 | 1 |
| | (Austria) Michael Ranseder | KTM | | | | | | | | | | 16 | | | | | | 18 | 0 |
| | (Spain) Julián Miralles | Aprilia | | 16 | 25 | | | | | Ret | | | | | | | | 19 | 0 |
| | (Italy) Michele Pirro | Aprilia | | | | 19 | | | | | | | | | | | | 16 | 0 |
| | (Italy) Lorenzo Zanetti | Honda | | | | Ret | | | | | | | | | | | | | 0 |
| | (Italy) Lorenzo Zanetti | Aprilia | | | | | | | | | | 21 | 19 | 21 | 21 | 20 | 24 | 17 | 0 |
| | (Italy) Alessio Aldrovandi | Honda | | | | 17 | | | | | | | | | | | | | 0 |
| | (Thailand) Suhathai Chaemsap | Honda | | | | | | | | | | | | 17 | | | | | 0 |
| | (Spain) Manuel Hernández | Aprilia | | Ret | | | 24 | | | | | | 23 | 18 | | | | 25 | 0 |
| | (Italy) Stefano Bianco | Aprilia | | | | 18 | | | | | | | | | | | | | 0 |
| | (Netherlands) Raymond Schouten | Honda | Ret | 20 | 28 | Ret | | 22 | 24 | Ret | Ret | 26 | 21 | 20 | 24 | 19 | 26 | Ret | 0 |
| | (Germany) Georg Fröhlich | Honda | | 22 | DNS | | | | | 23 | 20 | 25 | | | | | | | 0 |
| | (Italy) Mattia Angeloni | Honda | 25 | 21 | 27 | Ret | Ret | | | | | | | | | | | | 0 |
| | (Germany) Patrick Unger | Aprilia | | | | | | | | 21 | | | | | | | | | 0 |
| | (United Kingdom) Christian Elkin | Honda | | | | | | | | | 21 | | | | | | | | 0 |
| | (Italy) Manuel Manna | Malaguti | 26 | 24 | 23 | Ret | Ret | Ret | 23 | 26 | Ret | Ret | 22 | 22 | 23 | Ret | Ret | Ret | 0 |
| | (Italy) Simone Sanna | Aprilia | | | | | | | | Ret | 22 | | | | | | | | 0 |
| | (Spain) Nicolás Terol | Aprilia | | | | | | | | | | | | | | | | 22 | 0 |
| | (Czech Republic) Markéta Janáková | Honda | | | | | | 27 | Ret | DNQ | | 28 | 24 | 23 | DNQ | Ret | | DNQ | 0 |
| | (Czech Republic) Václav Bittman | Honda | | | | | | | | 25 | 23 | Ret | | | | | | | 0 |
| | (Netherlands) Jarno van der Marel | Honda | | | | | | 24 | | | | | | | | | | | 0 |
| | (Italy) Raffaele De Rosa | Honda | | | | | | | | | 24 | | | | | | | | 0 |
| | (Spain) Aleix Espargaró | Honda | | | | | | | | | | | | | | | | 24 | 0 |
| | (Finland) Mikko Kyyhkynen | Honda | | | | | 25 | 25 | Ret | | | | | | | | | | 0 |
| | (Spain) Enrique Jerez | Honda | | 25 | | | 26 | | | | | | | | | | | 26 | 0 |
| | (Italy) Max Sabbatani | Honda | | | | | | | | | | | | | Ret | Ret | 25 | Ret | 0 |
| | (United Kingdom) Eugene Laverty | Honda | | | | | | | | | 25 | | | | | | | | 0 |
| | (Netherlands) Adri den Bekker | Honda | | | | | | 26 | | | | | | | | | | | 0 |
| | (United Kingdom) Kris Weston | Honda | | | | | | | | | 26 | | | | | | | | 0 |
| | (Germany) Manuel Mickan | Honda | | | | | | | | 27 | | | | | | | | | 0 |
| | (United Kingdom) Tommy Bridewell | Honda | | | | | | | | | 27 | | | | | | | | 0 |
| | (Czech Republic) Patrik Vostárek | Honda | | | | | | | | | | 27 | | | | | | | 0 |
| | (Australia) Matthew Kuhne | Honda | | | | | | | | | | | | | | | 27 | | 0 |
| | (Spain) Jordi Planas | Honda | | | | | 28 | | | | | | | | | | | | 0 |
| | (France) Mathieu Gines | Honda | | | 29 | | | | | | | | | | | | | | 0 |
| | (Australia) Bryan Staring | Honda | | | | | | | | | | | | | | | 29 | | 0 |
| | (France) Yannick Deschamps | Honda | | | 30 | | | | | | | | | | | | | | 0 |
| | (Spain) Ismael Ortega | Aprilia | | Ret | | | | | | | | | | | | | | | 0 |
| | (France) Alexis Masbou | Honda | | | Ret | | | | | | | | | | | | | | 0 |
| | (Italy) Michele Danese | Aprilia | | | | Ret | | | | | | | | | | | | | 0 |
| | (Argentina) Fabricio Perrén | Honda | | | | | Ret | | | | | | | | | | | | 0 |
| | (Japan) Shigeki Norikane | Yamaha | | | | | | | | | | | | Ret | | | | | 0 |
| | (Japan) Yuki Hatano | Honda | | | | | | | | | | | | Ret | | | | | 0 |
| | (Netherlands) Frank van den Dragt | Honda | | | | | | DNQ | | | | | | | | | | | 0 |
| | (Netherlands) Gert-Jan Kok | Honda | | | | | | DNQ | | | | | | | | | | | 0 |
| | (Netherlands) Mark van Kreij | Honda | | | | | | DNQ | | | | | | | | | | | 0 |
| | (Portugal) Carlos Ferreira | Honda | | | | | | | | | | | DNQ | | | | | | 0 |
| | (Switzerland) Vincent Braillard | Honda | | | | | | | | | | | DNQ | | | | | | 0 |
| | (Australia) Brent Rigoli | Honda | | | | | | | | | | | | | | | DNQ | | 0 |
| | (Australia) Brett Simmonds | Honda | | | | | | | | | | | | | | | DNQ | | 0 |
| | (Australia) Malcolm Esler | Honda | | | | | | | | | | | | | | | DNQ | | 0 |
| Pos | Rider | Bike | RSA (South Africa) | SPA (Spain) | FRA (France) | ITA (Italy) | CAT (Catalonia) | NED (Netherlands) | RIO (Rio de Janeiro (state)) | GER (Germany) | GBR (United Kingdom) | CZE (Czech Republic) | POR (Portugal) | JPN (Japan) | QAT (Qatar) | MAL (Malaysia) | AUS (Australia) | VAL (Valencian Community) | Pts |

| Colour | Result |
|---|---|
| Gold | Winner |
| Silver | Second place |
| Bronze | Third place |
| Green | Points classification |
| Blue | Non-points classification |
| Blue | Non-classified finish (NC) |
| Purple | Retired, not classified (Ret) |
| Red | Did not qualify (DNQ) |
| Red | Did not pre-qualify (DNPQ) |
| Black | Disqualified (DSQ) |
| White | Did not start (DNS) |
| White | Withdrew (WD) |
| White | Race cancelled (C) |
| Blank | Did not practice (DNP) |
| Blank | Did not arrive (DNA) |
| Blank | Excluded (EX) |

**Bold** – Pole position
Italics – Fastest lap

==== Constructors' standings ====
- Each constructor got the same number of points as their best placed rider in each race.
- Rounds marked with a light blue background were under wet race conditions or stopped by rain.

| Pos | Constructor | RSA (South Africa) | SPA (Spain) | FRA (France) | ITA (Italy) | CAT (Catalonia) | NED (Netherlands) | RIO (Rio de Janeiro (state)) | GER (Germany) | GBR (United Kingdom) | CZE (Czech Republic) | POR (Portugal) | JPN (Japan) | QAT (Qatar) | MAL (Malaysia) | AUS (Australia) | VAL (Valencian Community) | Pts |
|---|---|---|---|---|---|---|---|---|---|---|---|---|---|---|---|---|---|---|
| 1 | (Italy) Aprilia | 2 | 1 | 2 | 1 | 1 | 2 | 1 | 1 | 2 | 3 | 1 | 4 | 3 | 3 | 4 | 1 | 329 |
| 2 | (Japan) Honda | 1 | 4 | 1 | 4 | 2 | 4 | 3 | 4 | 1 | 2 | 8 | 1 | 2 | 2 | 1 | 2 | 301 |
| 3 | (Austria) KTM | 3 | 5 | 6 | 2 | 4 | 3 | 2 | 5 | 4 | 16 | 2 | Ret | 4 | 1 | 3 | 18 | 204 |
| 4 | (Spain) Derbi | 16 | Ret | 3 | 10 | 5 | 1 | Ret | 6 | 3 | 1 | 3 | 7 | 1 | Ret | 2 | Ret | 179 |
| 5 | (Italy) Gilera | 17 | 13 | 20 | Ret | 22 | 14 | Ret | 22 | 11 | 15 | 10 | 2 | 5 | 5 | Ret | 15 | 61 |
| 6 | (Italy) Malaguti | 26 | 24 | 16 | 13 | 17 | 17 | 19 | 16 | 13 | Ret | 7 | 8 | 23 | 8 | 11 | 9 | 43 |
| 7 | (Japan) Yamaha | | | | | | | | | | 22 | | 9 | | | | | 7 |
| Pos | Constructor | RSA (South Africa) | SPA (Spain) | FRA (France) | ITA (Italy) | CAT (Catalonia) | NED (Netherlands) | RIO (Rio de Janeiro (state)) | GER (Germany) | GBR (United Kingdom) | CZE (Czech Republic) | POR (Portugal) | JPN (Japan) | QAT (Qatar) | MAL (Malaysia) | AUS (Australia) | VAL (Valencian Community) | Pts |
