= Yannick Deschamps =

French motorcycle racer

- Nationality: French
- Born: 7 February 1983 (age 43); Revin, France

Yannick Deschamps is a Grand Prix motorcycle racer from France.

== Career statistics ==
=== By season ===
Season	Class	Motorcycle	Team	Race	Win	Podium	Pole	FLap	Pts	Plcd
2004	125cc	Honda	TVX Racing	1	0	0	0	0	0	NC
2005	125cc	Honda	TVX Racing	1	0	0	0	0	0	NC
2006	125cc	Honda	TVX Racing-CTR Distribution	1	0	0	0	0	0	NC
Total				3	0	0	0	0	0	

=== Races by year ===
(key)

Year	Class	Bike	1	2	3	4	5	6	7	8	9	10	11	12	13	14	15	16	Pos.	Pts
2004	125cc	Honda	RSA	SPA	FRA; 30	ITA	CAT	NED	BRA	GER	GBR	CZE	POR	JPN	QAT	MAL	AUS	VAL	NC	0
2005	125cc	Honda	SPA	POR	CHN	FRA; Ret	ITA	CAT	NED	GBR	GER	CZE	JPN	MAL	QAT	AUS	TUR	VAL	NC	0
2006	125cc	Honda	SPA	QAT	TUR	CHN	FRA; 31	ITA	CAT	NED	GBR	GER	CZE	MAL	AUS	JPN	POR	VAL	NC	0
