= 2004 French motorcycle Grand Prix =

(France) 2004 French Grand Prix
Race details
- Race 3 of 16 races in the 2004 Grand Prix motorcycle racing season
- Date: 16 May 2004
- Official name: Grand Prix Polini de France
- Location: Bugatti Circuit
- Course: Permanent racing facility; 4.180 km (2.597 mi)

MotoGP
Pole position
- Rider: (Spain) Sete Gibernau
- Time: 1:33.425
Fastest lap
- Rider: (Italy) Max Biaggi
- Time: 1:34.088 on lap 27
Podium
- First: (Spain) Sete Gibernau
- Second: (Spain) Carlos Checa
- Third: (Italy) Max Biaggi

250cc
Pole position
- Rider: (Spain) Daniel Pedrosa
- Time: 1:37.123
Fastest lap
- Rider: (Spain) Daniel Pedrosa
- Time: 1:38.202 on lap 5
Podium
- First: (Spain) Daniel Pedrosa
- Second: (France) Randy de Puniet
- Third: (Spain) Toni Elías

125cc
Pole position
- Rider: (Italy) Andrea Dovizioso
- Time: 1:42.608
Fastest lap
- Rider: (Italy) Andrea Dovizioso
- Time: 1:42.651 on lap 14
Podium
- First: (Italy) Andrea Dovizioso
- Second: (Italy) Roberto Locatelli
- Third: (Spain) Jorge Lorenzo

The 2004 French motorcycle Grand Prix was the third round of the 2004 MotoGP Championship. It took place on the weekend of 14–16 May 2004 at the Bugatti Circuit located in Le Mans, France.

== MotoGP classification ==
Pos.	No.	Rider	Team	Manufacturer	Laps	Time/Retired	Grid	Points
1	15	(Spain) Sete Gibernau	Telefónica Movistar Honda MotoGP	Honda	28	44:22.750	1	25
2	7	(Spain) Carlos Checa	Gauloises Fortuna Yamaha	Yamaha	28	+1.671	2	20
3	3	(Italy) Max Biaggi	Camel Honda	Honda	28	+1.908	3	16
4	46	(Italy) Valentino Rossi	Gauloises Fortuna Yamaha	Yamaha	28	+4.272	4	13
5	45	(United States) Colin Edwards	Telefónica Movistar Honda MotoGP	Honda	28	+15.755	5	11
6	33	(Italy) Marco Melandri	Fortuna Gauloises Tech 3	Yamaha	28	+18.225	6	10
7	4	(Brazil) Alex Barros	Repsol Honda Team	Honda	28	+27.656	11	9
8	12	(Australia) Troy Bayliss	Ducati Marlboro Team	Ducati	28	+31.530	10	8
9	6	(Japan) Makoto Tamada	Camel Honda	Honda	28	+33.164	8	7
10	65	(Italy) Loris Capirossi	Ducati Marlboro Team	Ducati	28	+39.512	9	6
11	69	(United States) Nicky Hayden	Repsol Honda Team	Honda	28	+47.625	7	5
12	10	(United States) Kenny Roberts Jr.	Team Suzuki MotoGP	Suzuki	28	+1:12.140	13	4
13	99	(United Kingdom) Jeremy McWilliams	MS Aprilia Racing	Aprilia	28	+1:23.391	18	3
14	11	(Spain) Rubén Xaus	D'Antin MotoGP	Ducati	27	+1 lap	15	2
15	80	(United States) Kurtis Roberts	Proton Team KR	Proton KR	27	+1 lap	21	1
16	84	(Italy) Michel Fabrizio	WCM	Harris WCM	27	+1 lap	22	
17	9	(Japan) Nobuatsu Aoki	Proton Team KR	Proton KR	27	+1 lap	20	
Ret	56	(Japan) Shinya Nakano	Kawasaki Racing Team	Kawasaki	16	Retirement	12	
Ret	35	(United Kingdom) Chris Burns	WCM	Harris WCM	14	Retirement	23	
Ret	66	(Germany) Alex Hofmann	Kawasaki Racing Team	Kawasaki	5	Retirement	19	
Ret	17	(Japan) Norifumi Abe	Fortuna Gauloises Tech 3	Yamaha	0	Accident	17	
Ret	21	(United States) John Hopkins	Team Suzuki MotoGP	Suzuki	0	Accident	16	
Ret	50	(United Kingdom) Neil Hodgson	D'Antin MotoGP	Ducati	0	Accident	14	
DNS	67	(United Kingdom) Shane Byrne	MS Aprilia Racing	Aprilia		Did not start		

== 250 cc classification ==
Pos.	No.	Rider	Manufacturer	Laps	Time/Retired	Grid	Points
1	26	(Spain) Daniel Pedrosa	Honda	26	43:03.338	1	25
2	7	(France) Randy de Puniet	Aprilia	26	+7.711	2	20
3	24	(Spain) Toni Elías	Honda	26	+19.233	5	16
4	73	(Japan) Hiroshi Aoyama	Honda	26	+20.427	9	13
5	51	(San Marino) Alex de Angelis	Aprilia	26	+21.175	10	11
6	14	(Australia) Anthony West	Aprilia	26	+24.269	12	10
7	10	(Spain) Fonsi Nieto	Aprilia	26	+38.537	7	9
8	21	(Italy) Franco Battaini	Aprilia	26	+39.827	6	8
9	6	(Spain) Alex Debón	Honda	26	+42.589	13	7
10	11	(Spain) Joan Olivé	Aprilia	26	+47.541	16	6
11	96	(Czech Republic) Jakub Smrž	Honda	26	+47.874	18	5
12	57	(United Kingdom) Chaz Davies	Aprilia	26	+51.623	19	4
13	33	(Spain) Héctor Faubel	Aprilia	26	+51.813	15	3
14	8	(Japan) Naoki Matsudo	Yamaha	26	+58.880	20	2
15	25	(Italy) Alex Baldolini	Aprilia	26	+1:03.261	25	1
16	28	(Germany) Dirk Heidolf	Aprilia	26	+1:05.370	17	
17	9	(France) Hugo Marchand	Aprilia	26	+1:05.906	22	
18	36	(France) Erwan Nigon	Yamaha	26	+1:08.323	21	
19	15	(Germany) Christian Gemmel	Honda	26	+1:19.342	26	
20	77	(France) Grégory Lefort	Aprilia	26	+1:21.036	24	
21	44	(Japan) Taro Sekiguchi	Yamaha	26	+1:39.861	30	
22	42	(France) Grégory Leblanc	Aprilia	25	+1 lap	28	
Ret	19	(Argentina) Sebastián Porto	Aprilia	17	Accident	3	
Ret	12	(France) Arnaud Vincent	Aprilia	11	Accident	23	
Ret	50	(France) Sylvain Guintoli	Aprilia	10	Retirement	11	
Ret	43	(Czech Republic) Radomil Rous	Aprilia	6	Accident	27	
Ret	16	(Sweden) Johan Stigefelt	Aprilia	6	Retirement	29	
Ret	2	(Italy) Roberto Rolfo	Honda	4	Retirement	8	
Ret	54	(San Marino) Manuel Poggiali	Aprilia	1	Accident	4	
Ret	34	(France) Eric Bataille	Honda	1	Retirement	14	
DNQ	45	(France) Samuel Aubry	Honda		Did not qualify		
DNQ	46	(France) Vincent Eisen	Honda		Did not qualify		
DNQ	47	(France) Marc-Antoine Scaccia	Yamaha		Did not qualify		
WD	40	(Italy) Max Sabbatani	Yamaha		Withdrew		

== 125cc classification ==
Pos.	No.	Rider	Manufacturer	Laps	Time/Retired	Grid	Points
1	34	(Italy) Andrea Dovizioso	Honda	24	41:26.747	1	25
2	15	(Italy) Roberto Locatelli	Aprilia	24	+0.594	4	20
3	48	(Spain) Jorge Lorenzo	Derbi	24	+6.680	2	16
4	6	(Italy) Mirko Giansanti	Aprilia	24	+9.662	5	13
5	3	(Spain) Héctor Barberá	Aprilia	24	+10.178	3	11
6	36	(Finland) Mika Kallio	KTM	24	+20.698	20	10
7	22	(Spain) Pablo Nieto	Aprilia	24	+20.967	10	9
8	27	(Australia) Casey Stoner	KTM	24	+21.158	13	8
9	19	(Spain) Álvaro Bautista	Aprilia	24	+21.645	11	7
10	21	(Germany) Steve Jenkner	Aprilia	24	+23.080	6	6
11	23	(Italy) Gino Borsoi	Aprilia	24	+26.699	15	5
12	54	(Italy) Mattia Pasini	Aprilia	24	+29.332	17	4
13	10	(Spain) Julián Simón	Honda	24	+33.187	18	3
14	52	(Czech Republic) Lukáš Pešek	Honda	24	+37.002	21	2
15	24	(Italy) Simone Corsi	Honda	24	+40.239	12	1
16	14	(Hungary) Gábor Talmácsi	Malaguti	24	+40.304	22	
17	42	(Italy) Gioele Pellino	Aprilia	24	+51.919	24	
18	47	(Spain) Ángel Rodríguez	Derbi	24	+54.523	31	
19	26	(Germany) Dario Giuseppetti	Honda	24	+54.575	26	
20	32	(Italy) Fabrizio Lai	Gilera	24	+54.922	19	
21	25	(Hungary) Imre Tóth	Aprilia	24	+1:05.458	25	
22	33	(Spain) Sergio Gadea	Aprilia	24	+1:05.610	27	
23	8	(Italy) Manuel Manna	Malaguti	24	+1:13.982	29	
24	28	(Spain) Jordi Carchano	Aprilia	24	+1:14.248	34	
25	70	(Spain) Julián Miralles	Aprilia	24	+1:14.539	33	
26	66	(Finland) Vesa Kallio	Aprilia	24	+1:24.230	30	
27	11	(Italy) Mattia Angeloni	Honda	24	+1:27.607	36	
28	16	(Netherlands) Raymond Schouten	Honda	24	+1:36.938	32	
29	74	(France) Mathieu Gines	Honda	23	+1 lap	38	
30	73	(France) Yannick Deschamps	Honda	23	+1 lap	37	
Ret	69	(Denmark) Robbin Harms	Honda	22	Accident	28	
Ret	41	(Japan) Youichi Ui	Aprilia	12	Accident	7	
Ret	63	(France) Mike Di Meglio	Aprilia	9	Accident	8	
Ret	72	(France) Alexis Masbou	Honda	9	Retirement	35	
Ret	50	(Italy) Andrea Ballerini	Aprilia	7	Retirement	23	
Ret	7	(Italy) Stefano Perugini	Gilera	7	Retirement	16	
Ret	58	(Italy) Marco Simoncelli	Aprilia	1	Accident	9	
Ret	12	(Switzerland) Thomas Lüthi	Honda	0	Accident	14	
DNS	20	(Germany) Georg Fröhlich	Honda		Did not start		

== Championship standings after the race (MotoGP) ==
Below are the standings for the top five riders and constructors after round three has concluded.

Riders' Championship standings

Pos.	Rider	Points
1	(Spain) Sete Gibernau	66
2	(Italy) Max Biaggi	56
3	(Italy) Valentino Rossi	51
4	(Brazil) Alex Barros	38
5	(Spain) Carlos Checa	36

Constructors' Championship standings

Pos.	Constructor	Points
1	(Japan) Honda	70
2	(Japan) Yamaha	58
3	(Italy) Ducati	22
4	(Japan) Suzuki	15
5	(Japan) Kawasaki	11

- Note: Only the top five positions are included for both sets of standings.

Previous race: 2004 Spanish Grand Prix	FIM Grand Prix World Championship; 2004 season	Next race: 2004 Italian Grand Prix
Previous race: 2003 French Grand Prix	French motorcycle Grand Prix	Next race: 2005 French Grand Prix
