= Georg Fröhlich =

German motorcycle racer

- Nationality: German
- Born: 17 March 1988 (age 38); Rochlitz, East Germany
Motorcycle racing career statistics
125cc World Championship
Active years	2004, 2006–2007
Manufacturers	Honda, Malaguti
Starts / Wins / Podiums / Poles / F. laps / Points; 9 / 0 / 0 / 0 / 0 / 2

Georg Fröhlich (born 17 March 1988) is a German motorcycle racer who has competed in the 125cc World Championship. He won the IDM 125 Championship in 2007.

== Career statistics ==
=== Grand Prix motorcycle racing ===
==== By season ====
Season	Class	Motorcycle	Team	Race	Win	Podium	Pole	FLap	Pts	Plcd
2004	125cc	Honda	ADAC Honda Team	4	0	0	0	0	0	NC
2006	125cc	Honda	Abbink Bos Racing	4	0	0	0	0	0	NC
2006	125cc	Malaguti	Malaguti Ajo Corse	4	0	0	0	0	0	NC
2007	125cc	Honda	Abbink Bos Racing	1	0	0	0	0	2	27th
Total				9	0	0	0	0	2	

==== Races by year ====
(key)

Year	Class	Bike	1	2	3	4	5	6	7	8	9	10	11	12	13	14	15	16	17	Pos.	Pts
2004	125cc	Honda	RSA	SPA; 22	FRA; DNS	ITA	CAT	NED	BRA	GER; 23	GBR; 20	CZE; 25	POR	JPN	QAT	MAL	AUS	VAL		NC	0
2006	125cc	Honda	SPA	QAT	TUR	CHN	FRA	ITA	CAT	NED; 23		GER; 19	CZE	MAL	AUS	JPN	POR; 29	VAL		NC	0
2006	125cc	Malaguti									GBR; 32									NC	0
2007	125cc	Honda	QAT	SPA	TUR	CHN	FRA	ITA	CAT	GBR	NED	GER; 14	CZE	RSM	POR	JPN	AUS	MAL	VAL	27th	2
