= 2004 Spanish motorcycle Grand Prix =

(Spain) 2004 Spanish Grand Prix
Race details
- Race 2 of 16 races in the 2004 Grand Prix motorcycle racing season
- Date: 2 May 2004
- Official name: Gran Premio Marlboro de España
- Location: Circuito de Jerez
- Course: Permanent racing facility; 4.423 km (2.748 mi)

MotoGP
Pole position
- Rider: (Italy) Valentino Rossi
- Time: 1:40.818
Fastest lap
- Rider: (Spain) Sete Gibernau
- Time: 1:53.508 on lap 11
Podium
- First: (Spain) Sete Gibernau
- Second: (Italy) Max Biaggi
- Third: (Brazil) Alex Barros

250cc
Pole position
- Rider: (Argentina) Sebastián Porto
- Time: 1:43.673
Fastest lap
- Rider: (Italy) Roberto Rolfo
- Time: 1:58.815 on lap 16
Podium
- First: (Italy) Roberto Rolfo
- Second: (France) Randy de Puniet
- Third: (Spain) Fonsi Nieto

125cc
Pole position
- Rider: (Italy) Marco Simoncelli
- Time: 1:48.106
Fastest lap
- Rider: (Germany) Steve Jenkner
- Time: 2:00.510 on lap 7
Podium
- First: (Italy) Marco Simoncelli
- Second: (Germany) Steve Jenkner
- Third: (Spain) Héctor Barberá

The 2004 Spanish motorcycle Grand Prix was the second round of the 2004 MotoGP Championship. It took place on the weekend of 30 April – 2 May 2004 at the Circuito de Jerez.

== MotoGP classification ==
Pos.	No.	Rider	Team	Manufacturer	Laps	Time/Retired	Grid	Points
1	15	(Spain) Sete Gibernau	Telefónica Movistar Honda MotoGP	Honda	27	52:01.293	2	25
2	3	(Italy) Max Biaggi	Camel Honda	Honda	27	+5.452	4	20
3	4	(Brazil) Alex Barros	Repsol Honda Team	Honda	27	+52.570	9	16
4	46	(Italy) Valentino Rossi	Gauloises Fortuna Yamaha	Yamaha	27	+58.556	1	13
5	69	(United States) Nicky Hayden	Repsol Honda Team	Honda	27	+59.283	7	11
6	7	(Spain) Carlos Checa	Gauloises Fortuna Yamaha	Yamaha	27	+1:07.184	3	10
7	45	(United States) Colin Edwards	Telefónica Movistar Honda MotoGP	Honda	27	+1:19.539	8	9
8	10	(United States) Kenny Roberts Jr.	Team Suzuki MotoGP	Suzuki	27	+1:45.057	10	8
9	56	(Japan) Shinya Nakano	Kawasaki Racing Team	Kawasaki	26	+1 lap	6	7
10	84	(Italy) Michel Fabrizio	WCM	Harris WCM	26	+1 lap	23	6
11	17	(Japan) Norifumi Abe	Fortuna Gauloises Tech 3	Yamaha	26	+1 lap	20	5
12	65	(Italy) Loris Capirossi	Ducati Marlboro Team	Ducati	26	+1 lap	15	4
13	66	(Germany) Alex Hofmann	Kawasaki Racing Team	Kawasaki	26	+1 lap	14	3
14	9	(Japan) Nobuatsu Aoki	Proton Team KR	Proton KR	26	+1 lap	21	2
15	21	(United States) John Hopkins	Team Suzuki MotoGP	Suzuki	26	+1 lap	13	1
Ret	33	(Italy) Marco Melandri	Fortuna Gauloises Tech 3	Yamaha	18	Accident	11	
Ret	50	(United Kingdom) Neil Hodgson	D'Antin MotoGP	Ducati	17	Retirement	18	
Ret	80	(United States) Kurtis Roberts	Proton Team KR	Proton KR	13	Retirement	22	
Ret	6	(Japan) Makoto Tamada	Camel Honda	Honda	11	Retirement	5	
Ret	99	(United Kingdom) Jeremy McWilliams	MS Aprilia Racing	Aprilia	10	Retirement	19	
Ret	11	(Spain) Rubén Xaus	D'Antin MotoGP	Ducati	1	Accident	12	
Ret	12	(Australia) Troy Bayliss	Ducati Marlboro Team	Ducati	1	Accident	17	
Ret	67	(United Kingdom) Shane Byrne	MS Aprilia Racing	Aprilia	0	Accident	16	
DNQ	35	(United Kingdom) Chris Burns	WCM	Harris WCM		Did not qualify		

== 250 cc classification ==
Pos.	No.	Rider	Manufacturer	Laps	Time/Retired	Grid	Points
1	2	(Italy) Roberto Rolfo	Honda	26	52:20.145	5	25
2	7	(France) Randy de Puniet	Aprilia	26	+8.740	4	20
3	10	(Spain) Fonsi Nieto	Aprilia	26	+32.623	7	16
4	14	(Australia) Anthony West	Aprilia	26	+32.844	13	13
5	6	(Spain) Alex Debón	Honda	26	+58.884	15	11
6	51	(San Marino) Alex de Angelis	Aprilia	26	+1:03.950	8	10
7	19	(Argentina) Sebastián Porto	Aprilia	26	+1:05.322	1	9
8	12	(France) Arnaud Vincent	Aprilia	26	+1:08.923	21	8
9	77	(France) Grégory Lefort	Aprilia	26	+1:47.081	28	7
10	8	(Japan) Naoki Matsudo	Yamaha	26	+1:49.191	19	6
11	25	(Italy) Alex Baldolini	Aprilia	26	+1:55.028	24	5
12	24	(Spain) Toni Elías	Honda	26	+2:01.756	6	4
13	9	(France) Hugo Marchand	Aprilia	25	+1 lap	20	3
14	16	(Sweden) Johan Stigefelt	Aprilia	25	+1 lap	27	2
15	44	(Japan) Taro Sekiguchi	Yamaha	25	+1 lap	30	1
16	28	(Germany) Dirk Heidolf	Aprilia	25	+1 lap	22	
17	33	(Spain) Héctor Faubel	Aprilia	25	+1 lap	11	
18	63	(Italy) Jarno Ronzoni	Yamaha	25	+1 lap	32	
19	43	(Czech Republic) Radomil Rous	Aprilia	25	+1 lap	29	
20	11	(Spain) Joan Olivé	Aprilia	25	+1 lap	14	
21	42	(France) Grégory Leblanc	Aprilia	24	+2 laps	31	
Ret	41	(Spain) Álvaro Molina	Aprilia	24	Accident	23	
Ret	50	(France) Sylvain Guintoli	Aprilia	23	Retirement	12	
Ret	21	(Italy) Franco Battaini	Aprilia	23	Accident	9	
Ret	15	(Germany) Christian Gemmel	Honda	23	Accident	25	
Ret	96	(Czech Republic) Jakub Smrž	Honda	17	Retirement	18	
Ret	57	(United Kingdom) Chaz Davies	Aprilia	8	Accident	17	
Ret	40	(Italy) Max Sabbatani	Yamaha	5	Retirement	26	
Ret	26	(Spain) Daniel Pedrosa	Honda	4	Accident	3	
Ret	73	(Japan) Hiroshi Aoyama	Honda	3	Accident	10	
Ret	34	(France) Eric Bataille	Honda	3	Accident	16	
Ret	54	(San Marino) Manuel Poggiali	Aprilia	0	Accident	2	

== 125 cc classification ==
Pos.	No.	Rider	Manufacturer	Laps	Time/Retired	Grid	Points
1	58	(Italy) Marco Simoncelli	Aprilia	23	47:45.700	1	25
2	21	(Germany) Steve Jenkner	Aprilia	23	+0.760	11	20
3	3	(Spain) Héctor Barberá	Aprilia	23	+7.195	12	16
4	34	(Italy) Andrea Dovizioso	Honda	23	+8.042	5	13
5	27	(Australia) Casey Stoner	KTM	23	+14.612	3	11
6	50	(Italy) Andrea Ballerini	Aprilia	23	+15.096	21	10
7	41	(Japan) Youichi Ui	Aprilia	23	+17.076	7	9
8	15	(Italy) Roberto Locatelli	Aprilia	23	+19.413	6	8
9	22	(Spain) Pablo Nieto	Aprilia	23	+27.056	4	7
10	6	(Italy) Mirko Giansanti	Aprilia	23	+30.433	10	6
11	10	(Spain) Julián Simón	Honda	23	+32.702	17	5
12	24	(Italy) Simone Corsi	Honda	23	+33.160	27	4
13	32	(Italy) Fabrizio Lai	Gilera	23	+56.667	22	3
14	28	(Spain) Jordi Carchano	Aprilia	23	+1:09.373	25	2
15	26	(Germany) Dario Giuseppetti	Honda	23	+1:16.661	33	1
16	70	(Spain) Julián Miralles	Aprilia	23	+1:20.067	35	
17	33	(Spain) Sergio Gadea	Aprilia	23	+1:20.141	24	
18	66	(Finland) Vesa Kallio	Aprilia	23	+1:47.063	32	
19	23	(Italy) Gino Borsoi	Aprilia	23	+1:54.016	13	
20	16	(Netherlands) Raymond Schouten	Honda	23	+2:01.488	31	
21	11	(Italy) Mattia Angeloni	Honda	23	+2:02.922	38	
22	20	(Germany) Georg Fröhlich	Honda	22	+1 lap	37	
23	7	(Italy) Stefano Perugini	Gilera	22	+1 lap	20	
24	8	(Italy) Manuel Manna	Malaguti	22	+1 lap	30	
25	71	(Spain) Enrique Jerez	Honda	22	+1 lap	36	
26	25	(Hungary) Imre Tóth	Aprilia	20	+3 laps	18	
Ret	12	(Switzerland) Thomas Lüthi	Honda	21	Accident	28	
Ret	52	(Czech Republic) Lukáš Pešek	Honda	20	Accident	19	
Ret	54	(Italy) Mattia Pasini	Aprilia	19	Accident	16	
Ret	47	(Spain) Ángel Rodríguez	Derbi	16	Accident	34	
Ret	14	(Hungary) Gábor Talmácsi	Malaguti	15	Accident	9	
Ret	63	(France) Mike Di Meglio	Aprilia	10	Retirement	15	
Ret	36	(Finland) Mika Kallio	KTM	7	Accident	8	
Ret	69	(Denmark) Robbin Harms	Honda	6	Accident	29	
Ret	81	(Spain) Ismael Ortega	Aprilia	6	Retirement	39	
Ret	42	(Italy) Gioele Pellino	Aprilia	5	Accident	26	
Ret	43	(Spain) Manuel Hernández	Aprilia	4	Accident	23	
Ret	48	(Spain) Jorge Lorenzo	Derbi	3	Accident	14	
Ret	19	(Spain) Álvaro Bautista	Aprilia	0	Accident	2	

== Championship standings after the race (MotoGP) ==
Below are the standings for the top five riders and constructors after round two has concluded.

Riders' Championship standings

Pos.	Rider	Points
1	(Spain) Sete Gibernau	41
2	(Italy) Max Biaggi	40
3	(Italy) Valentino Rossi	38
4	(Brazil) Alex Barros	29
5	(United States) Nicky Hayden	22

Constructors' Championship standings

Pos.	Constructor	Points
1	(Japan) Honda	45
2	(Japan) Yamaha	38
3	(Italy) Ducati	14
4	(Japan) Suzuki	11
5	(Japan) Kawasaki	11

- Note: Only the top five positions are included for both sets of standings.

Previous race: 2004 South African Grand Prix	FIM Grand Prix World Championship; 2004 season	Next race: 2004 French Grand Prix
Previous race: 2003 Spanish Grand Prix	Spanish motorcycle Grand Prix	Next race: 2005 Spanish Grand Prix
