= Jan Roelofs =

Dutch motorcycle racer

- Nationality: Dutch
- Born: 25 April 1985 (age 41); Sint-Michielsgestel, Netherlands

Jan Roelofs is a Grand Prix motorcycle racer from the Netherlands.
