= List of Suzuka Circuit fatalities =

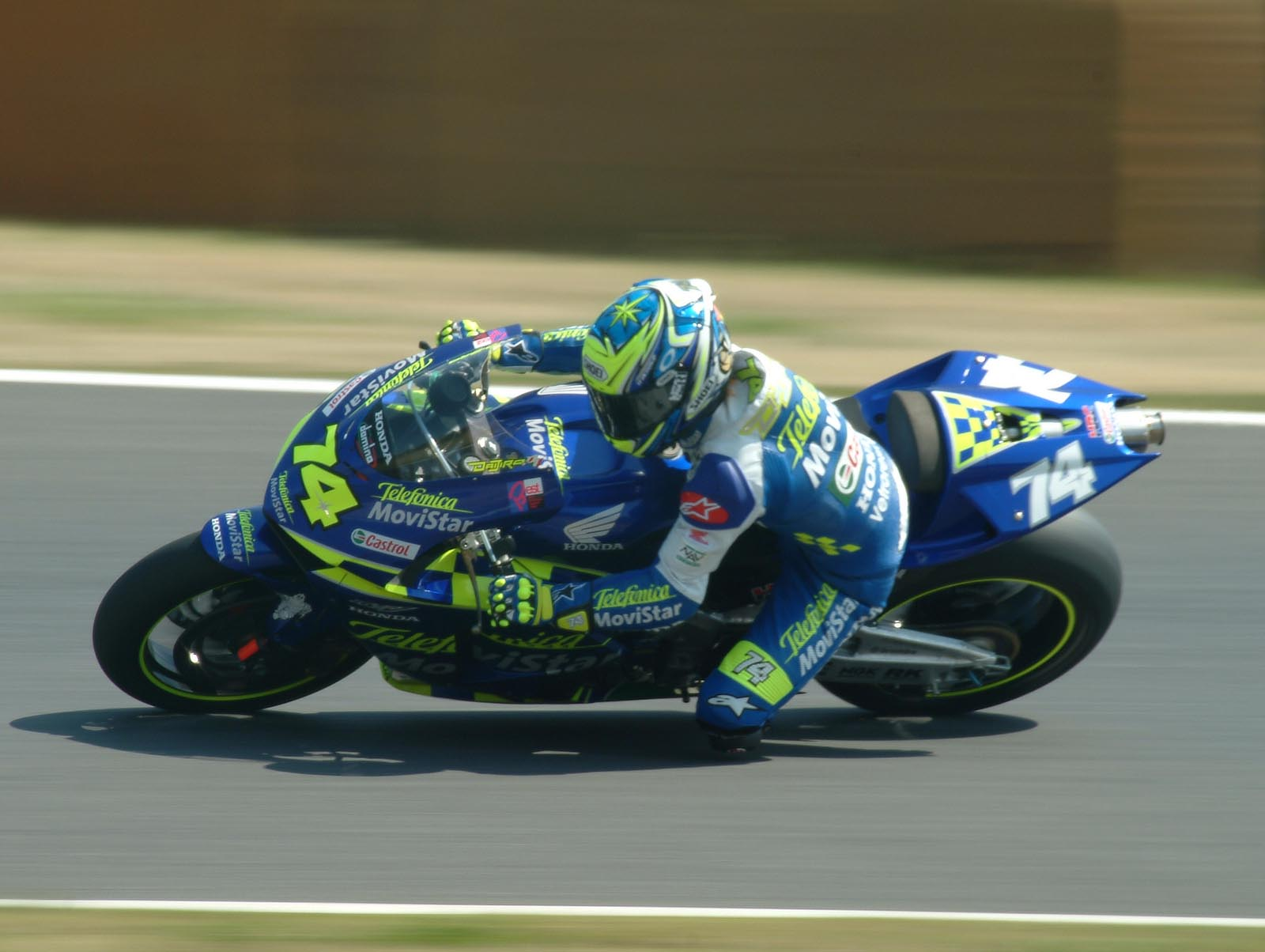
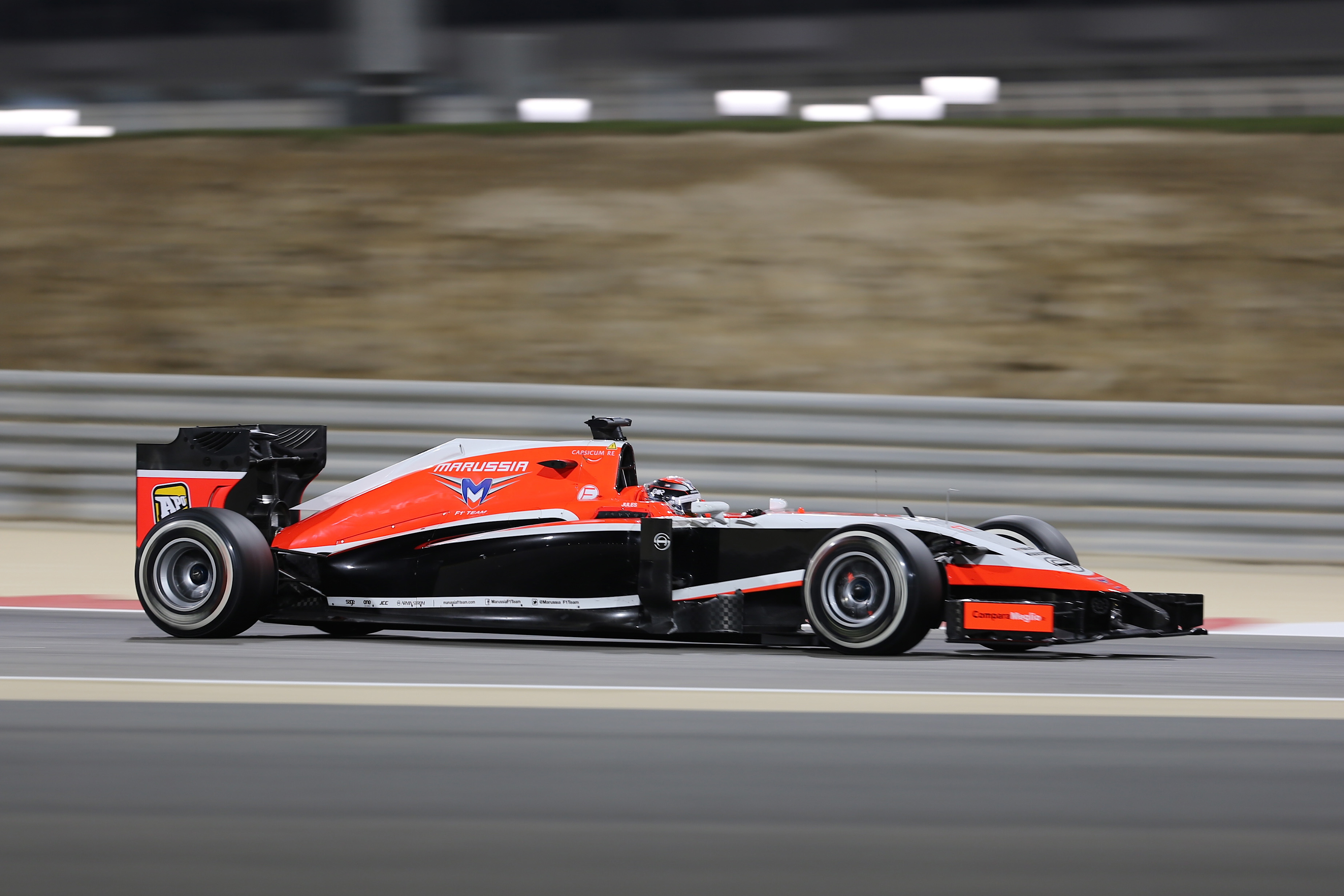
Daijiro Kato (left) most recent rider fatally injured during a MotoGP race, Jules Bianchi (right) most recent driver fatally injured during a Formula One race.

This article lists the fatal accidents that happened in the Suzuka Circuit, a motorsport race track that is operated by Mobilityland, a subsidiary of Honda Motor Co., Ltd., located in Suzuka City in the Mie Prefecture of Japan. Twelve have involved cars, including one involving the pace car, and seven have involved motorcycles. Seventeen people have died in accidents at the track during its half-century of existence, almost all of them Japanese professional racers, with the exceptions of American pace car driver Elmo Langley and French driver Jules Bianchi.

Deaths at the track have included that of Honda RC211V racer Daijiro Kato on 20 April 2003, after the Japanese motorcycle Grand Prix race. He died of a brain stem infarction after spending two weeks in a coma. Dome Karasu driver Tojiro Ukiya died in a test run on 20 August 1965, Lola T92/50 (with Mugen Honda engine) racer Hitoshi Ogawa on 24 May 1992, while on the way to the hospital immediately after the Japanese Formula 3000 race; and American, NASCAR pace car driver Elmo Langley died on 21 November 1996. Langley suffered a heart attack while driving the pace car.

The most recent fatal accident to have happened at the track is that of Jules Bianchi on 5 October 2014, who collided with a crane tractor that was deployed to pick up Adrian Sutil's car, which had spun out earlier. Bianchi succumbed to his injuries on 17 July 2015 following a nine-month coma, making him the first non-Japanese driver to die as a result of a crash on the track.

== List of fatal accidents involving competitors ==
Driver	Date	Vehicle	Entrant	Section	Type	Event	Cause
(Japan) Masao Asano	4 May 1963	Austin-Healey 3000		130R	Car	Japanese Grand Prix	As Asano approached 130R, he crashed into the guardrail, throwing him clear of the car suffering a severe head injury. He died in hospital three months later.
(Japan) Tojiro Ukiya	20 August 1965	Dome Karasu		130R	Car	Testing	While avoiding two spectators who were walking on the course, Ukiya swerved but crashed into a lamppost. He was thrown off his car, suffering head injury and fracturing both legs and died in hospital 21 days later. The car is believed to be a Dome Karasu, a rebodied S600 and was the first car to be built by Dome.
(Japan) Takeshi Mitsuno	10 October 1965	Honda S600			Car	Suzuka KSCC race meeting	
(Japan) Takashi Matsunaga	10 August 1969	Honda R1300	Honda	Spoon Curve	Car	Suzuka 12 Hours race	As Matsunaga was about to stop to refuel, he crashed into a guardrail, causing the car to explode into a fireball. He was taken into hospital where he died 25 days later on 4 September
(Japan) Kiyoshi Akiyama	23 August 1970	Honda S800		Spoon Curve	Car	Suzuka 12 Hours race	Akiyama's Honda S800 struck Hiromi Nishino's Isuzu Bellett at Spoon corner, causing the two cars to explode into a fireball, burning 150 liters of gasoline. While Nishino managed to escape with the aid of marshals, Akiyama remained in the burning car about 15 minutes. He later died of extensive burns.
(Japan) Satoru Takashima	8 August 1970			Degner	Motorcycle	Suzuka 10 Hours Production	During a Saturday qualifying session, 20-year-old newcomer Takashima went straight on at the Degner bend and flew over the guardrails, sustaining severe head and chest injuries. He was transferred to hospital where he succumbed to head injuries shortly afterwards, specifically basilar skull fracture.
(Japan) Minoru Kawai	26 August 1970	Toyota 7	Toyota	Degner	Car	Testing	Kawai lost control of the Toyota 7 at the Degner bend at about 200 km/h, being thrown out of the car. He sustained a basal skull fracture and two broken legs, and was immediately taken to hospital by ambulance. About 30 minutes later he died of his injuries.
(Japan) Senkichi Omura	7 April 1974	Brabham BT21		Spoon	Car	F2000 private test	Omura crashed into a guardrail, and was killed on impact by a broken neck.
(Japan) Shoji Iso	6 March 1982			1st Curve	Car	All-Japan Formula Three Championship practice	Iso's car spun on the 1st Curve and stopped on the grass. While he was walking away, he was struck by another car, killing him instantly.
(Japan) Kengo Kiyama	10 June 1983			Spoon	Motorcycle	200 km of Suzuka qualifying	While approaching the Spoon curve, Kiyama crashed and was killed instantly.
(Japan) Kunio Katsumata	30 July 1983				Motorcycle	Suzuka 8 Hours qualifying	
(Japan) Hitoshi Ogawa	24 May 1992	Lola T92/50 - Mugen Honda	Team Cerumo	First Corner	Car	Japanese Formula 3000 race	Ogawa attempted to overtake Andrew Gilbert-Scott's car on the main straight but Gilbert-Scott held his position. As Ogawa moved to the side of Gilbert-Scott's car he hit its left-rear wheel and the cars became entangled. The two of them travelled down the straight at speed and off into the gravel trap. Gilbert-Scott's car spun while Ogawa's car went in nose-first. Gilbert-Scott's car hit the tyre wall and flipped, landing upside down. However, Ogawa hit a mound and went over the tyre barrier, hitting a high-fence supporting pole with violent force. Both cars were completely destroyed in the accident and the race was immediately stopped. One cameraman, several photographers, and Gilbert-Scott were all injured. Ogawa was freed from his wrecked Team Cerumo Lola, but had suffered severe leg, head and neck injuries during the crash. He died on the way to a hospital.
(United States) Elmo Langley	21 November 1996	Chevrolet Corvette	Pace Car	S-Curve	Car	NASCAR Thunder 100	NASCAR official and pace car driver Langley suffered a heart attack during safety car runs for the NASCAR exhibition race and stopped in the S-Curve. He was the first person from outside Japan to die at the circuit.
(Japan) Naoto Ogura	7 March 2000	Suzuki Hayabusa	Yoshimura	200R	Motorcycle	Testing	Ogura crashed into a barrier on the outside of 200R (between the hairpin and Spoon), where he was taken to hospital and eventually died from his injuries. Motorcycles no longer use 200R after 2004 revisions added a chicane.
(Japan) Mamoru Yamakawa	30 July 2000	Kawasaki Ninja ZX-9R	Challenge of Yamakawa	130R	Motorcycle	Suzuka 8 Hours race	Yamakawa lost control of his Kawasaki after failing to negotiate 130R and crashed into the cushioned barriers. He was dead on arrival. It was the first of a few major incidents in various classes of motorsport at 130R, leading it to be reprofiled for 2003.
(Japan) Daijiro Kato	20 April 2003	Honda RC211V	Gresini Racing	Between 340R and Casio Triangle	Motorcycle	Japanese motorcycle Grand Prix race	Exiting the 85R/340R double-apex (formerly 130R, a reference to the 130m radius curve prior to the 2003 revisions) on Lap 3, Kato high-sided on the straight exiting 340R, braking for the Casio Triangle. He struck the wall at around 125 mph (200 km/h), and was thrown back onto the track. Rather than waving a red flag to allow the race to be stopped so the track could be safely cleared, corner workers dragged Kato's body off the track and threw him on a stretcher. The race was not stopped. Kato spent two weeks in a coma before dying as a result of the injuries he sustained. The cause of death was listed as brain stem infarction. The Japanese Motorcycle Grand Prix has not been held at Suzuka since.
(Japan) Keisuke Sato	12 June 2005	Honda CBR600RR		Second Corner	Motorcycle	200 km of Suzuka qualifying	On the last lap of a qualifying session for a 200-kilometer race, Sato lost control of his bike when he attempted to swerve around a pool of fuel left on the track that had not been cleaned after another accident involving two other competitors causing him to run off the road and hit a safety barrier, causing him fatal thoracic injuries.
(Japan) Osamu Nakajima	21 October 2012	Nissan 350Z	Rire Racing & LeyJun	First Corner	Car	WTCC Race of Japan; Super Taikyu Series support race	Nakajima's car slipped on oil from a previous incident at the first corner on lap 11. He slid off the road and hit the wall, resulting in fatal injuries. The race was stopped, and no champagne was sprayed during winner's ceremonies for the feature race. Nakajima died as a result of a basilar skull fracture from not wearing an FIA-certified frontal head restraint (FHR), leading to Super Taiku mandating an FIA-certified frontal head restraint as a result. The weekend, which the race was supporting the 2012 FIA WTCC Race of Japan, also saw the death of an unnamed guest of SunRed Engineering, who fell from the second floor of the stands above Arena Motorsport and Special Tuning Racing.
(France) Jules Bianchi	5 October 2014	Marussia MR03	Marussia F1	Dunlop Corner	Car	Japanese Grand Prix	On lap 42 of the Grand Prix, Adrian Sutil had spun into the runoff area at Dunlop Corner, in heavy rain, and a crane tractor was deployed to attend to his car. Afterwards, with only Dunlop Corner under yellow but the rest of the track still under green, Bianchi collided at high speed with the tractor, knocking him unconscious. He was taken to a hospital, where a CT scan revealed that he had suffered a "severe head injury". Flown to France for further treatment, he never regained consciousness, and died of his injuries on 17 July 2015 in Nice, France. The FIA made administrative race changes following the crash. The Bianchi family began legal proceedings against Manor Racing the current owners of the then Marussia F1, Honda Motor Company's Mobilityland owners of the Suzuka Circuit, Suzuka City, Mie Prefecture, Kansai region, Formula One Group, and the FIA, in relation to his death.
