= Malaguti Ciak =

Scooter produced by italian motorcycle company Malaguti

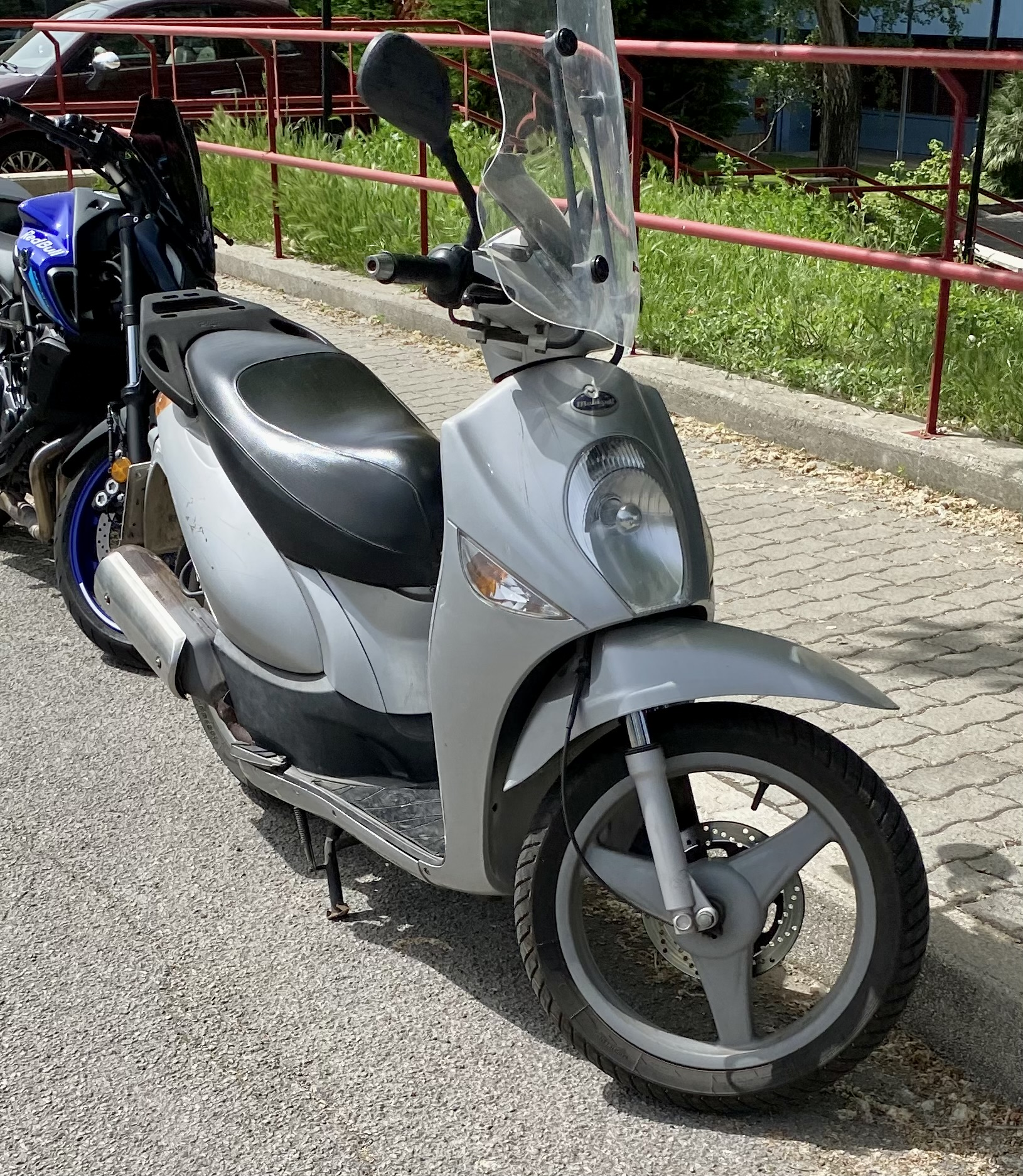
- Ciak 125
- Manufacturer: Malaguti
- Production: 1999-2011
- Assembly: Castel San Pietro Terme, Italy
- Predecessor: Malaguti Centro 50
- Engine: 50 Minarelli; 50 Piaggio; 100 Minarelli; 125 Kymco; 150 Kymco; 200 Kymco
- Transmission: CVT
- Wheelbase: 1270-1305 mm
- Dimensions: L: 2000 mm W: 690-725 mm
- Weight: 102-120 kg (dry)

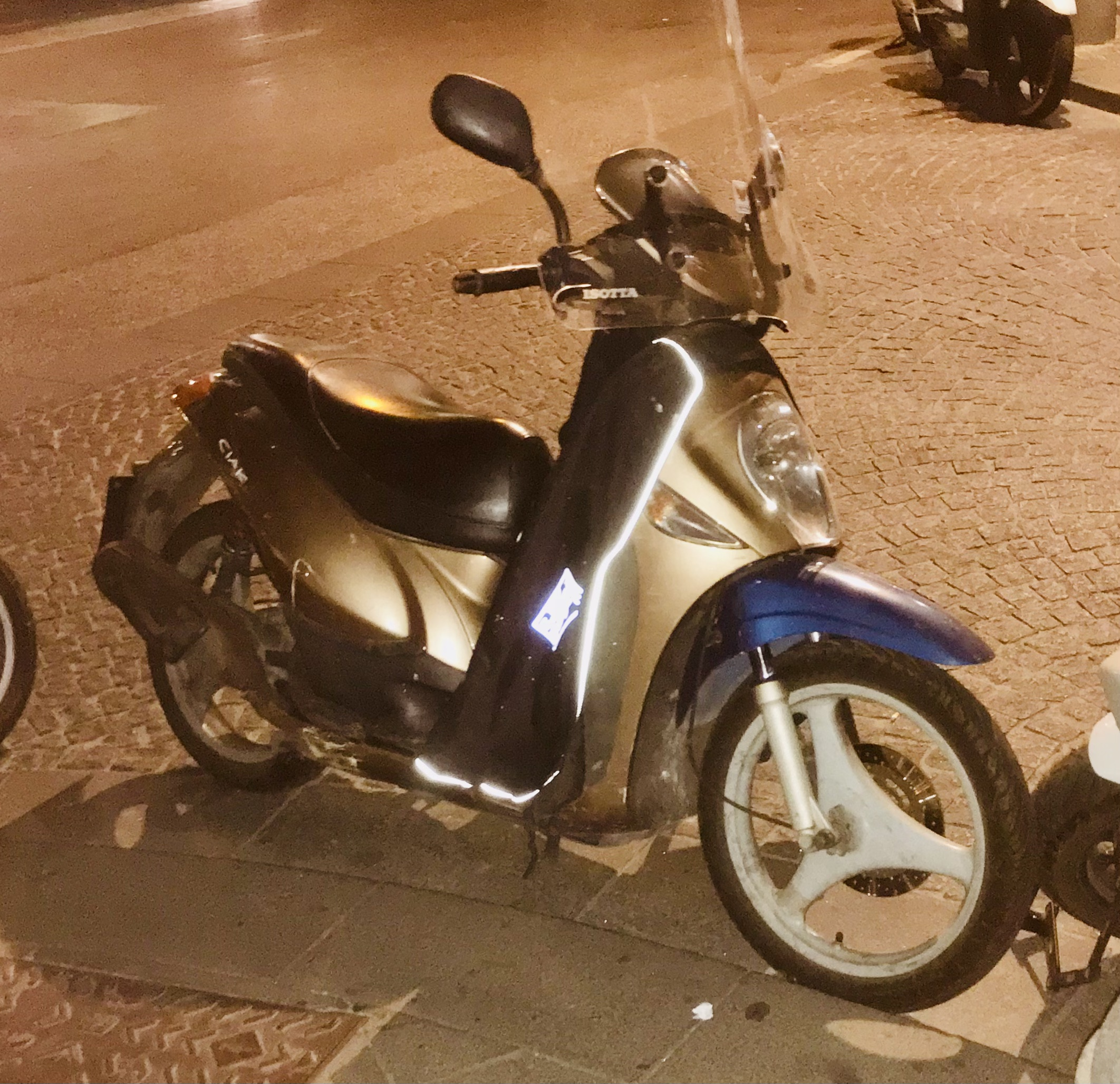
Malaguti Ciak 50

The Malaguti Ciak is a scooter produced by Malaguti from 1999 to 2011 at the historic Malaguti factory in Castel San Pietro Terme.

== History ==
The Ciak was presented at the Intermot Munich show in October 1998 together with the maxiscooter Madison and both were part of the new strategy of renewed products of the Bologna house. This is a high-wheeled scooter that went into production in the spring of 1999 intended to replace the now elderly Malaguti Centro 50 which had been in production since 1992. The Ciak was characterized by 16” wheels and a flat platform with a compartment under the saddle able to accommodate a demi-jet helmet, the engine range at the debut was composed of 50 and 100 engines of origin Yamaha-Minarelli Euro 2 approved.

The model immediately found a lot of appreciation among the public becoming one of the best-selling models of the brand and the following year the 125 and 150 models were introduced, equipped with single-cylinder four-stroke and four-valve engines produced by Kymco.

In September 2001 there was an update that saw the introduction of the double disc braking system both front and rear for a fee and the prototype of the four-stroke Ciak 100 was presented with a new engine of Piaggio origin intended to replace the old 100 two-stroke Minarelli.

However, the 100 four-stroke will not go into production and the older two-stroke model equipped with a catalytic converter will continue to be produced until 2003.

=== November 2003: the Ciak Master ===
In November 2003 the Ciak undergoes a first restyling where the front shield and the headlight are changed, a front wheel with a new three-spoke design and a new saddle makes its debut. The 100 engine is out of production and has been permanently replaced by the 125 variant. Model 50 remains in production in the pre-restyled variant.

In the spring of 2004, the 50 two-stroke model was also restyled and adopted the name Ciak Master.

=== 2005 update ===
In 2005 there was an update of the range, the new 50 four-stroke with Piaggio engine made its debut and the top of the range Ciak 200 with four-stroke Kymco engine was also introduced.

The Ciak 150 went out of production in 2006.

Production of all Ciak models ends in April 2011 following the financial difficulties of the parent company.

== Ciak Electric Power ==
In November 2000, the Ciak Electric Power, the first electric moped produced by Malaguti and developed together with Engines Engineering, also went into production. The electric Ciak has the same aesthetics as the thermal engine Ciak but has four maintenance-free lead-acid batteries with 12V voltage and connection in series, for a total power supply voltage of the engine of 48 Volts. Three of these batteries are positioned on the platform which is no longer flat, the fourth battery is in the compartment under the saddle. The wheels are 12 inches instead of 16 and has a dedicated LCD instrumentation. The electric motor delivers a nominal power of 1.23 kW at 1400 rpm and a maximum torque of 17 Nm. Charging takes place in 3 hours for 80% of the total capacity of the accumulators and 6 hours for 100%. The weight of the electric Ciak is 145 kg (of which 66 kg of batteries only). The range is between 45 and 60 km and the limited maximum speed is 45 km/h compliant with the approval of a scooter 50.
