= Malaguti Spidermax =

Scooter produced by italian motorcycle company Malaguti

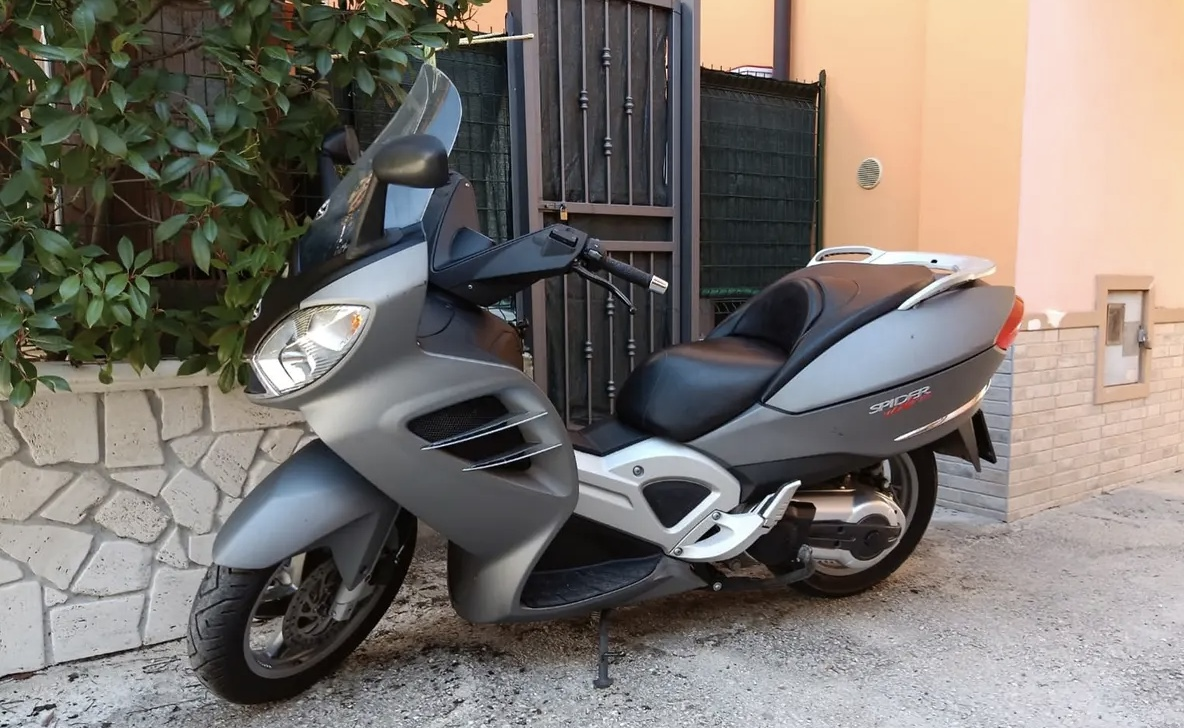
- Manufacturer: Malaguti
- Production: 2004-2011
- Assembly: Castel San Pietro Terme, Italy
- Engine: 460 cm³ Piaggio Master; 493 cm³ Piaggio Master
- Transmission: CVT
- Brakes: front: 270 mm double disc rear: 260 mm disc
- Wheelbase: 1490 mm
- Dimensions: L: 2240 mm W: 810 mm H: 1430 mm
- Seat height: 760 mm
- Weight: 204 kg (dry)

The Malaguti Spidermax is a maxiscooter produced by the Italian motorcycle company Malaguti from 2004 to 2011 at the historic factory in Castel San Pietro Terme.

== History ==
=== Development ===
The design of a Malaguti brand maxi scooter (to be positioned higher than the Madison model) was entrusted in 2000 to Engines Engineering led by engineer Alberto Strazzari. Known by the code project B2, the development cost the manufacturer about 6 million euro and lasted 3 years.

This model was intended to compete with the Japanese maxi scooters which in Europe were gaining ever greater market shares. Among the main features of the Spidermax were the engine single-cylinder engine combined with an innovative frame die-cast aluminum perimeter frame inspired by motorcycles, made up of two shells joined by through screws and integrated by tubular steel frames to support the platform and the rear structure. The style was the result of the Malaguti style center while the aerodynamics were studied in the wind tunnel. The engine was the 500 Master (effective 460 cm^{3}) supplied by Piaggio.

=== Spidermax GT 500 (2004-2010) ===
The presentation of the Spidermax GT 500 took place at the end of 2003; the GT500 siga underlined the intention to offer further sportier versions of the model in the future.

The model went into production in the spring of 2004 and went on sale on the Italian market and in the remaining European markets from the autumn.

Aesthetically, the Spidermax GT 500 has a large front with two V-shaped lights joined by a small grille with chrome edges, very large side air intakes, the very large rear volume houses a 38-litre underseat compartment capable of accommodating two full-face helmets. The central part of the scooter is painted in a contrasting, aluminum colour.

The front Paioli fork is telehydraulic type with 41 mm diameter stems operates with a stroke of 120 mm. The rear suspension is an oscillating motor, with an articulated attachment to the frame. The shock absorbers are two, telehydraulic, with adjustable spring preload and 75 mm travel. The brake system is made by Grimeca and is of the integral type with two 270 mm front discs and a 260 mm rear disc, all with two-piston floating caliper.

The engine is the Piaggio Master 500 of 460 cm^{3} single cylinder and single shaft 4 valves liquid cooled and four stroke which delivers 40 HP at 7250 rpm and 42 Nm of torque at 6000 rpm powered by electronic injection combined with transmission at continuous centrifugal variator speed, with automatic centrifugal clutch. The engine at its debut was homologated Euro 2. The declared weight is 204 kg. The front and rear tires are 16”.

In January 2007, the Euro 3 approved GT 500 was presented.

The GT 500 remained in production until 2010 with the 460 cm^{3} Master engine.

=== Spidermax RS 500 (2007-2011) ===
A slight restyling was presented at EICMA in November 2007 and put on sale from December; on that occasion a second variant is also introduced, the RS 500 with a sportier characterization which joins the GT 500 model. The renewed Spidermax presents a new front shield with an unprecedented grille, new graphics for the instrument cluster and new 493 cm^{3} Euro 3 approved Piaggio Master engine which delivers 30.5 kW (41 HP) at 7250 rpm and 45 Nm of torque at 6000 rpm. The lateral chrome plating that characterizes the GT version is not present on the RS version.

A weakened variant with 24.5 kW (33 HP) at 6500 rpm was offered for A1 license holders and drivable from 18 years of age.

Production of the Spidermax RS 500 ends in April 2011 following the closure of the company.
