= Malaguti Password =

Scooter produced by Malaguti

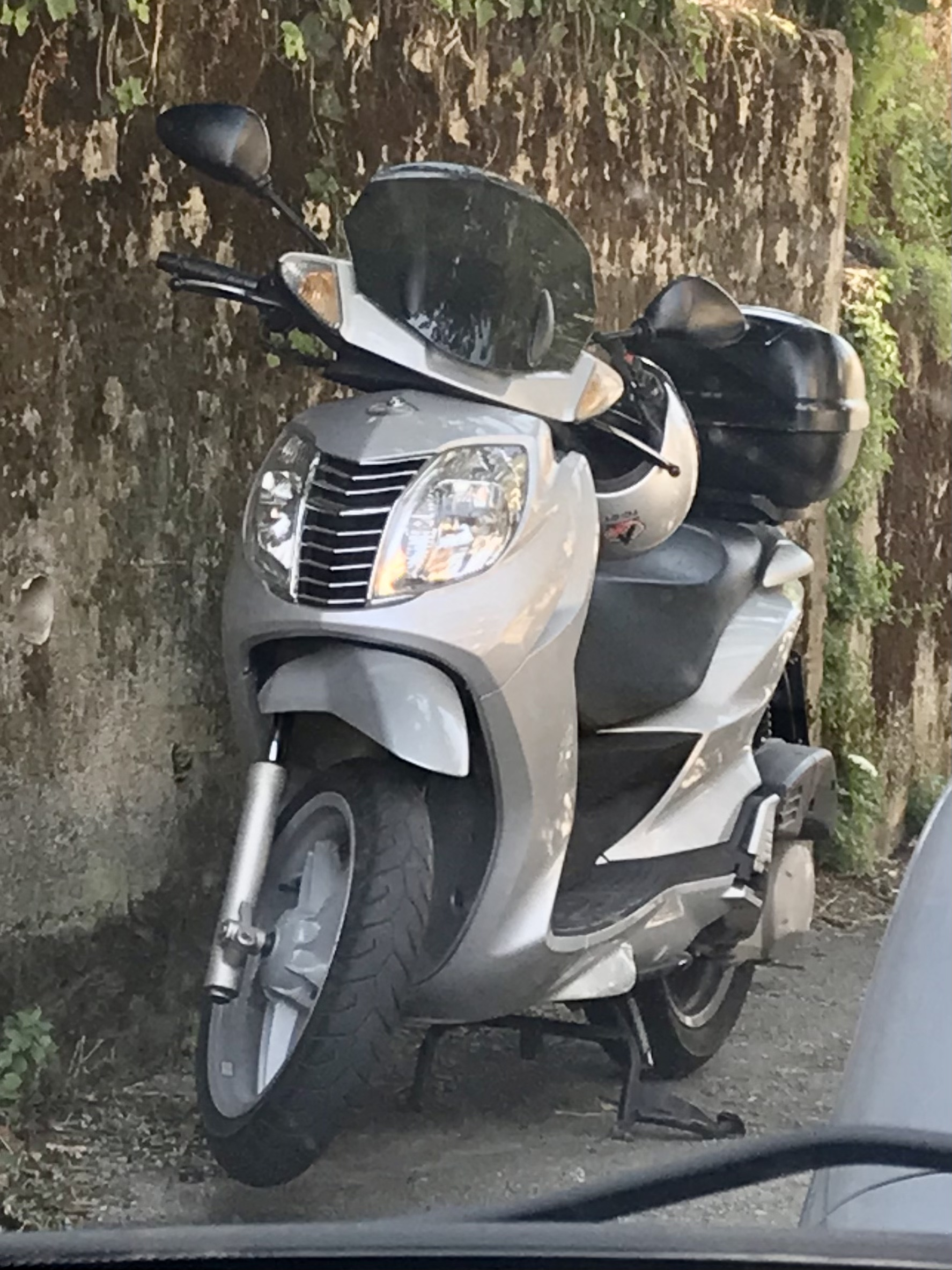
- Manufacturer: Malaguti
- Production: 2005–2011
- Assembly: Castel San Pietro Terme, Italy
- Engine: 250 cm³ Yamaha
- Power: 20.8 HP
- Transmission: CVT
- Wheelbase: 1484 mm
- Dimensions: L: 2160 mm W: 750 mm H: 1310 mm
- Weight: 162 kg (dry)
- Fuel capacity: 9,2 l
- Related: Malaguti Centro

The Malaguti Password is a scooter produced by Malaguti from 2005 to 2011 at the historic Malaguti factory in Castel San Pietro Terme.

== History ==
The development of the new Malaguti medium high-wheel scooter was started at the end 2003 and the entire project cost over 5 million euros and lasted 18 months; in May 2005 the Password was officially presented to the public. Sales start immediately in Italy. Available with the Yamaha 250 engine (produced in Italy by Minarelli) it delivers 20.8 HP at 7,500 rpm and is approved according to the Euro 2 standard. The front suspensions are of the hydraulic fork type with 35 mm stanchions while at the rear the double adjustable shock absorber is adopted, the braking system is composed of a Disc 270 mm front and 240 mm rear. The saddle has a ground clearance of 778 mm, the wheelbase measures 1,484 mm. The wheels are 16 inches, the tubeless type tires have the dimensions 110/70/16 at the front and 140/70/16 at the rear. The weight is 162 kg.

In May 2007 the engine was homologated Euro 3.

Production ends in April 2011 following the financial difficulties of the parent company.
