= Gilera Nexus =

Maxi-scooter manufactured by Gilera

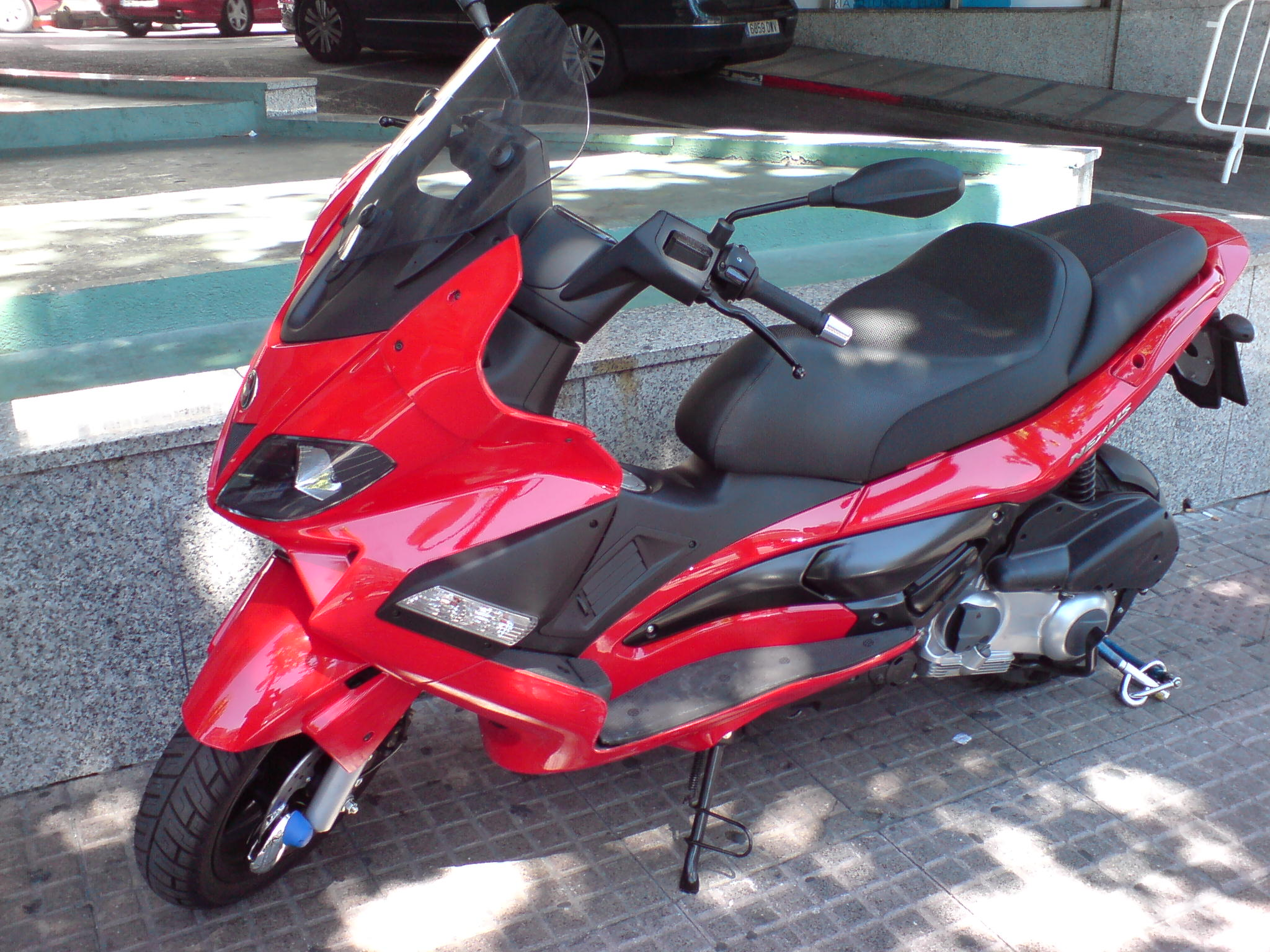
- Manufacturer: Gilera
- Also called: Aprilia SR Max
- Parent company: Piaggio & Co. SpA
- Production: 2003–2014 (Italy); 2017-present (China)
- Assembly: Pontedera, Italy; Foshan, China
- Class: Maxi-scooter
- Engine: 124 cm^{3} Leader 125 four-stroke; 244 cm^{3} Quasar 250 four-stroke; 278 cm^{3} Quasar 300 four-stroke; 460 cm^{3} Master 500 four-stroke

Gilera Nexus is a maxi-scooter manufactured by Italian company Piaggio under the Gilera brand. Sold from 2003. It is available in four engines (the 125, 250, 300 and 500 cm^{3}).

All engines are single cylinder four-stroke water cooled.

== History ==
Designed by Frascoli Design the Nexus 500 i.e. was first presented and marketed in 2003.

In 2006 Gilera added two other engines, the 250 and the 125 cm^{3}.

In 2008 the 250 cm^{3} model went out of production, replaced by the 300 cm^{3}.

Version 300 and version 500 remain on sale since 2012 until 2014.

== Aprilia SR Max ==
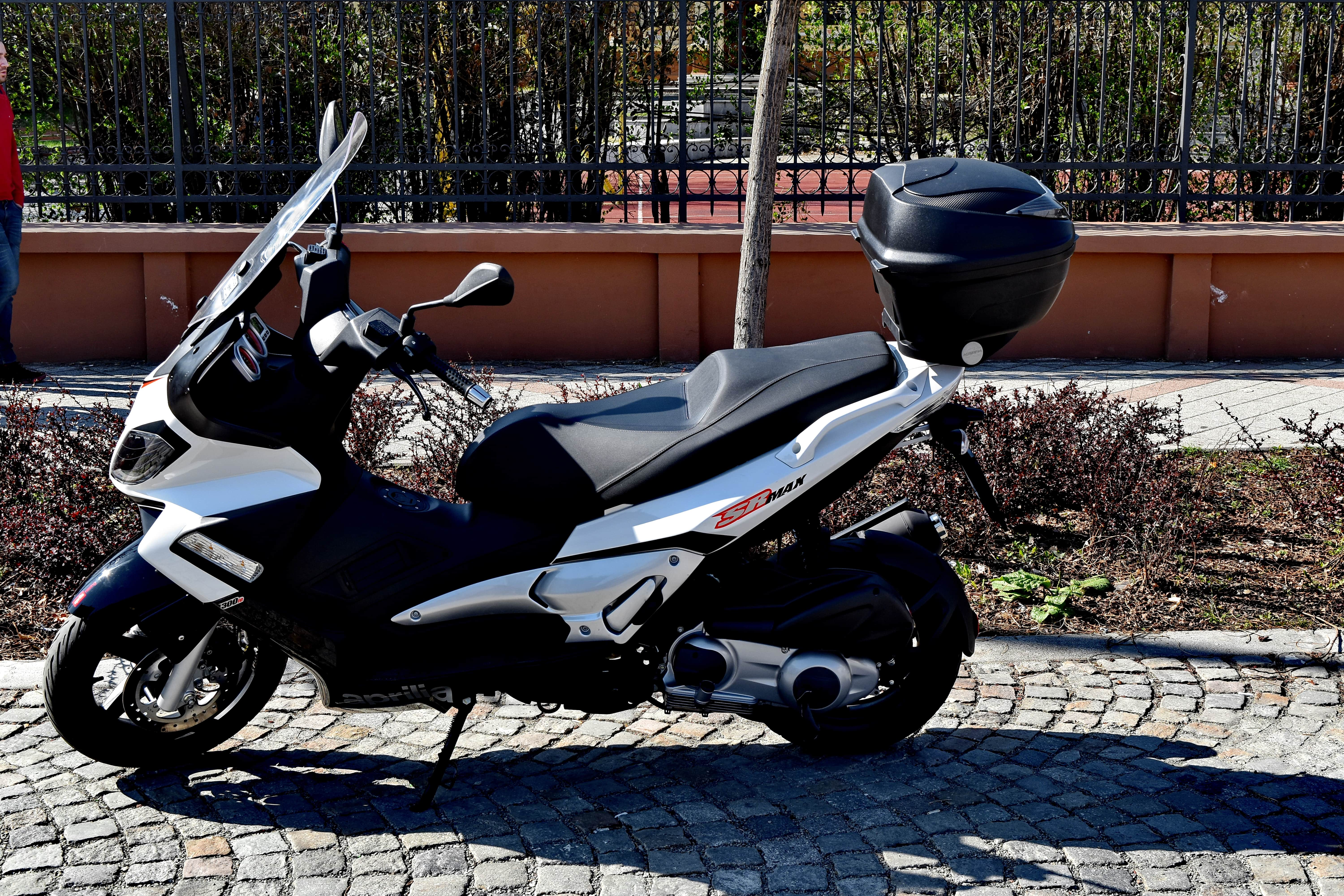
Aprilia SR Max 300

Since June 2011, the Nexus has been marketed in Europe and Asia also by Aprilia under the name Aprilia SR Max proposed with Piaggio Quasar 125 and 300 engines only.

It achieved some success only in the 300 variant. Production in Italy for the European market ended definitively in 2016.

Since 2017 it has been re-proposed in China produced locally by the Zongshen Piaggio Foshan Motorcycle joint venture in the Euro 4 approved 300 variant and sold only on the local market. This model will also be imported into Europe from 2019 by the Austrian group KSR renamed Malaguti Madison 300 (KSR holds the rights to the Malaguti brand).

From 2022 the SR Max on the Chinese market is also offered with the 250 HPE engine.

== Engines and specifications ==
	125 i.e.	250 i.e.	300 i.e.	500 i.e.
Engine
Engine Type	124 cc (7.6 cu in) single cylinder four-stroke	244.29 cc (14.907 cu in) single cylinder four-stroke	278 cc (17.0 cu in) single cylinder four-stroke	460 cc (28 cu in) single cylinder four-stroke
Bore/Stroke	57.0 mm × 48.6 mm (2.24 in × 1.91 in)	72.0 mm × 60.0 mm (2.83 in × 2.36 in)	75.0 mm × 63.0 mm (2.95 in × 2.48 in)	92.0 mm × 69.0 mm (3.62 in × 2.72 in)
Compression Ratio	11.5-13:1	11:1 (±0.5)	11:1 (±0.5)	10.5:1
Emission Regulations	EURO 3			
Drivetrain
Transmission	CVT			
Front Suspension	Hydraulic telescopic fork with Ø 35 stem			Hydraulic telescopic fork Ø 41 mm stem
Rear Suspension	Two double-acting shock absorbers, adjustable to four positions at preloading			Shock absorber (with double- acting helicoidal spring and adjustment of the spring preload in 7 positions)
Front Brakes	Ø 260 mm disc brake with hydraulic control activated by handlebar right-side lever			Double discs Ø 260 mm with floating caliper and twin Ø 28 mm plungers (Brembo) at front right and twin Ø 26 mm plungers (Brembo) at front left
Rear Brakes	Ø 240 mm disc brake with hydraulic control activated by the handlebar left side lever			Single disc Ø 240 mm with fixed caliper and two opposed Ø 34 mm plungers
Front Tire	120/70-14"		120/70-15"	
Rear Tire	140/70-14"	140/60-14"		160/60-14"
Electricity
Ignition	Electronic inductive discharge ignition, high efficiency, with separate HV coil			
Battery	12V 12Ah		12V 14Ah	
Dimensions
Wheelbase	1,515 mm (59.6 in)	1,530 mm (60 in)	1,515 mm (59.6 in)	
Length	2,100 mm (83 in)			2,090 mm (82 in)
Width	780 mm (31 in)			765 mm (30.1 in)
Seat Height	780 mm (31 in) adjustable			
Weight (dry)	169 kg (373 lb)	174 kg (384 lb)		199 kg (439 lb)
Liquids capacity
Fuel	15 L (3.3 imp gal; 4.0 US gal), including approximately 2.8 L (0.62 imp gal; 0.74 US gal) reserve	15 L (3.3 imp gal; 4.0 US gal), including 2 L (0.44 imp gal; 0.53 US gal) reserve	15 L (3.3 imp gal; 4.0 US gal), including 2.8 L (0.62 imp gal; 0.74 US gal) reserve	14.5 L (3.2 imp gal; 3.8 US gal), including 2 L (0.44 imp gal; 0.53 US gal) reserve
Engine Oil	1.3 L (0.29 imp gal; 0.34 US gal)	1.3 L (0.29 imp gal; 0.34 US gal) (empty), 1.2 L (0.26 imp gal; 0.32 US gal) (at oil and filter change)		1.7 L (0.37 imp gal; 0.45 US gal) (empty), 1.5 L (0.33 imp gal; 0.40 US gal) (at oil and filter change)
Cooling System	1.75 L (0.38 imp gal; 0.46 US gal) (approximately)	2 L (0.44 imp gal; 0.53 US gal) (approximately)	1.8 L (0.40 imp gal; 0.48 US gal) (approximately)	
Performance
Power Output	11 kW (15 hp) @ 9500 rpm	16.5 kW (22 hp) @ 8000 rpm	16.1 kW (22 hp) @ 7250 rpm	29.5 kW (40 hp) @ 7500 rpm
Torque	12 N-m @ 8000 rpm	21 N-m @ 6250 rpm	23 N-m @ 6000 rpm	43 N-m @ 5500 rpm
Max Speed	120 km/h (75 mph)	125 km/h (78 mph)	125 km/h (78 mph)	162 km/h (101 mph)
