= Carrera Autopodistica =

Annual Italian human-powered land vehicle racing competition

The Carrera Autopodistica is an annual human-powered land vehicle racing competition that takes place in September in Castel San Pietro Terme near Bologna, Italy. The vehicles involved are unique, soapbox-like cars driven by a pilot and propelled by "spingitori", or pushing men. Every year this competition attracts not only local people but also foreigners, and recently the peculiarity of the race has caught the attention of national television networks -private and public-, increasing the visibility of Castel San Pietro Terme.

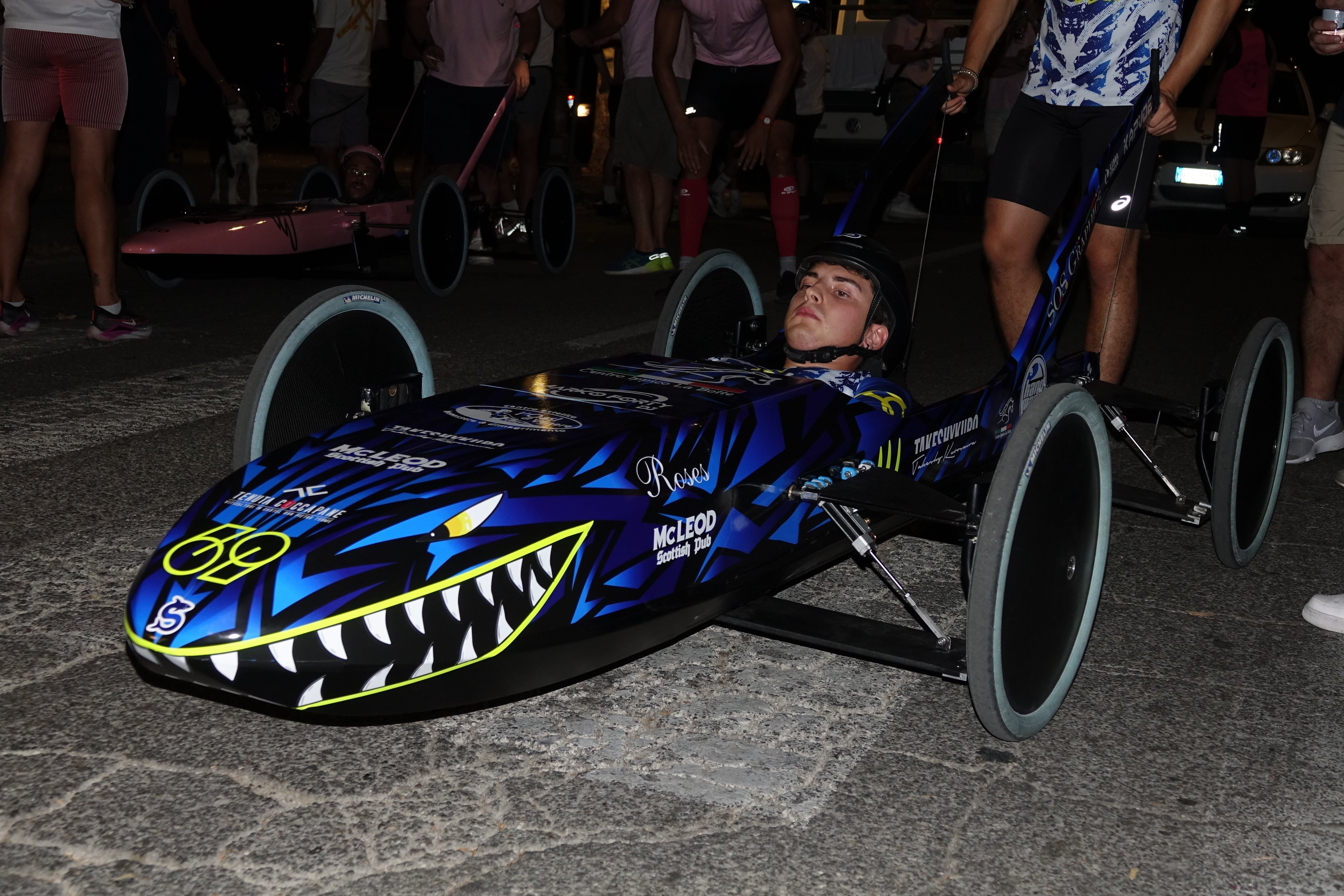

== History ==
The race is the central happening of Settembre Castellano, a series of cultural, sports, and gastronomic events, which have their climax every year on the second Sunday of September with the Sagra Castellana della Braciola (the sheep chop fair), which has been running since 1951. The Carrera Autopodistica has been running since 1954.

Over the last half-century, technological and sporting innovations such as moving from wood to carbon fiber and titanium cars have improved race performances. Teams work round the year decreasing vehicle weight and improving performance on both downhill roads and flat ground.

In 2023, Team Squalo made its debut in the Carrera Autopodistica, a team predominantly composed of young individuals in their early twenties but with great determination and enthusiasm, bringing the team to join forces with Team Delfino to form a single large group called the Ocean Divisione Corse. In 2024, the Carrera autopodistica celebrates its 70th anniversary since its foundation, a unique event that will see teams battling it out on the cobblestones of the historic center and in the Terme Cup.

== Races ==
There are two competitions every year, held in the same day. The Coppa Terme, spanning a distance of 1,600 metres, starts at the beginning of Viale delle Terme and ends at the entrance of the spa building. The Carrera Autopodistica is the main event, taking place in the historical town center. Start and finish line is located in Piazza XX Settembre. The race consists in two laps of the urban track, each one is 1,250 meters. Another competition, which takes place in May, anticipating the Carrera Autopodistica of September, is the so-called Carrera dei Piccoli or “Baby Carrera”, run by young people (under 15) on the same track of the Carrera Autopodistica.

== Rules ==
Four pushing men ("spingitori") and a pilot take part in the races. The pushing men swap running and pushing the car, like in a relay race, where the baton is the car. The competition rules allow only one person to push the car at a time. On the downhill part of the track ("la bassa"), where the car increases its speed, the pusher jumps in the car behind the driver and then resumes pushing when the car speed reduces.

== Programme ==
Every year the program traditionally schedules the time trials on the first Sunday of September, which decide the starting grid. On the second Sunday of September, the Coppa Terme and Carrera Autopodistica races take place.

== Race results "Trofeo Maurizio Ragazzi" ==
2013

Pos.	Team	Start Grid
1	Mora	2
2	Coyote	1
3	Nibbio	7

2014

Pos.	Team	Start Grid
1	Coyote	2
2	Mora	1
3	Nibbio	6

2015

Pos.	Team	Start Grid
1	Coyote	2
2	Ovetto	7
3	Grifo	9

2016

Pos.	Team	Start Grid
1	Mora	1
2	Coyote	2
3	Porz	4

2017

Pos.	Team	Start Grid
1	Mora	1
2	Ov	3
3	Coyote	4

2018

Pos.	Team	Start Grid
1	Mora	1
2	Ov	3
3	Coyote	4

2019

Pos.	Team	Start Grid
1	Mora	1
2	Ov	2
3	Porz	3

2020 The edition was canceled due to COVID-19.

2021

Pos.	Team	Start Grid
1	Ovetto	6
2	Cavedano	8
3	Bianco Nibbio	10

== Gallery ==
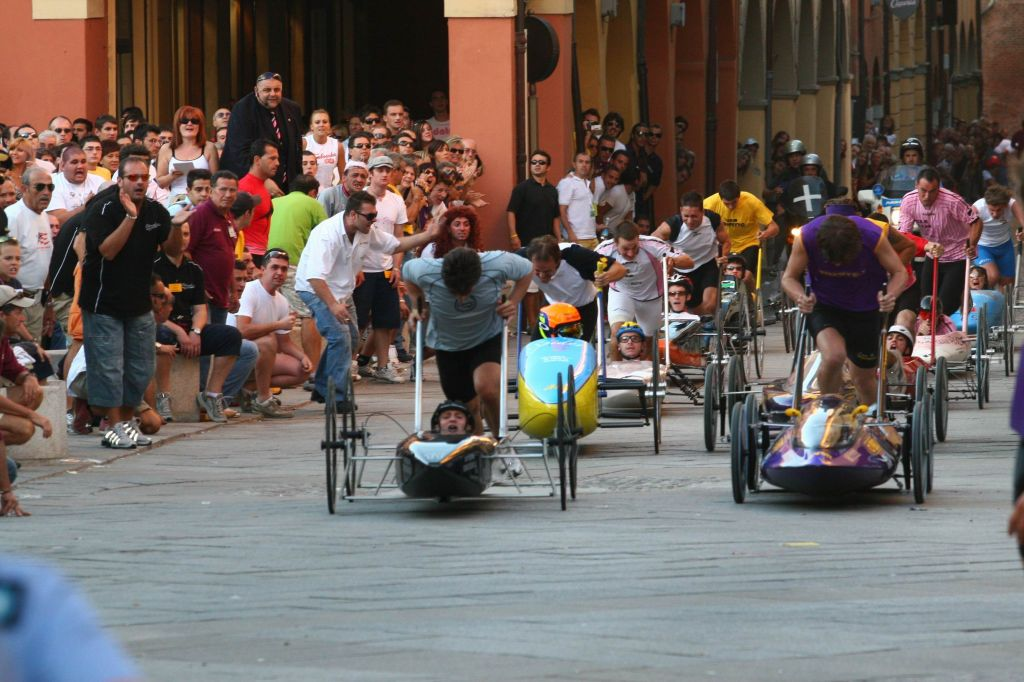
Start of the Carrera Autopodistica 2006

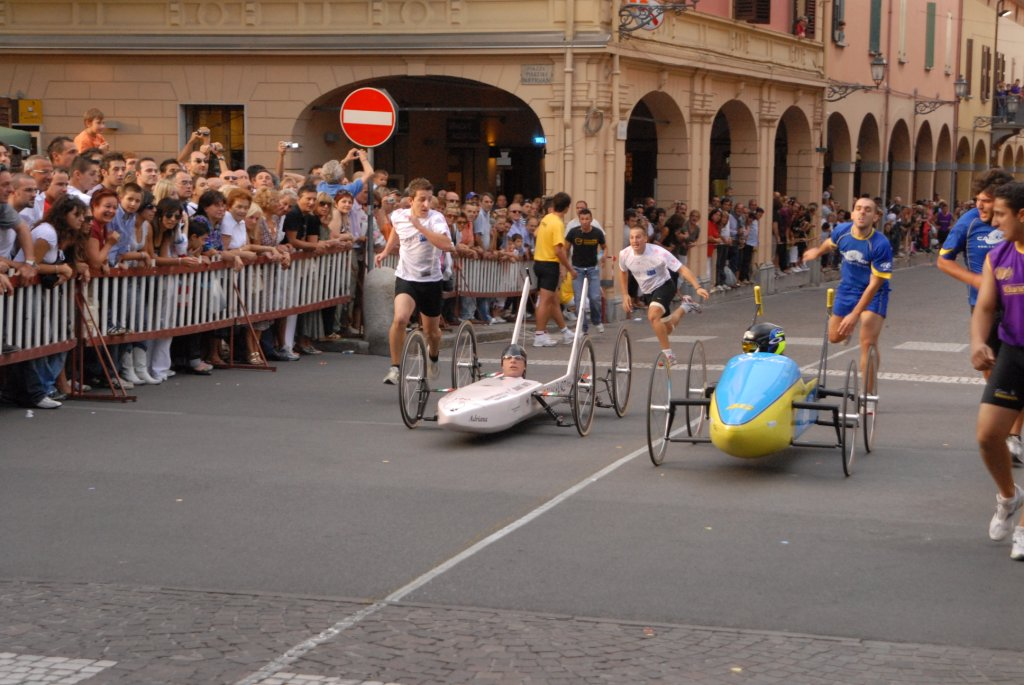
During the race 2006

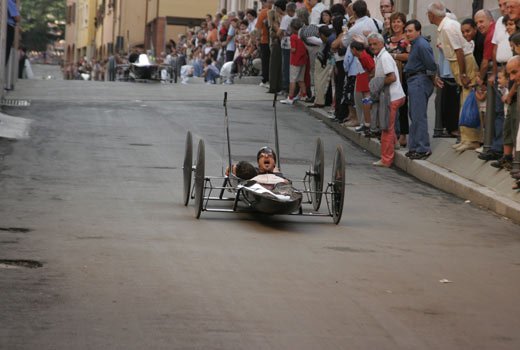
On the downhill in race 2005
