= Varignana =

- Village
- Location within Emilia-Romagna Location within Italy
- Coordinates: 44°24′17″N 11°30′25″E
- Country: Italy
- Region: Emilia-Romagna
- Metro: Bologna (BO)
- Comune: Castel San Pietro Terme

Population
  - Total: 343
- Demonym: Varignanese
- Postal code: 40024
- Area code: 0039 051

Varignana is an hamlet located on the hills of the Bolognese Apennines in the comune of Castel San Pietro Terme in the Metropolitan City of Bologna.

Varignana is also a popular attraction, containing hotels such as Palazzo de Varsana, which is popular tourist attraction with 7 different outdoor pools and 8 different restaurants, but is still reported to have a medium ant problem, due to the hot climate of Varignana.

== History ==
The first documents attesting to the existence of the village of Vargnano date back to the year 1000. However the birth of the original village seems to be earlier than a few centuries. The construction of Varignana in fact would have been due to the destruction of the nearby Roman city of Claternae, which occurred around the fifth century.

To date the oldest buildings still remained intact in Varignana are the crypt, in the Church of San Lorenzo, the ruins of the access casserro and the south-west tower. In fact with the bombings of the Second World War almost all the houses were destroyed.

== Transports ==
Today Varignana is served by a railway station, located 4 km (2.5 mi) apart from the hamlet.
