= Malaguti Madison =

Scooter produced by Malaguti since 1999

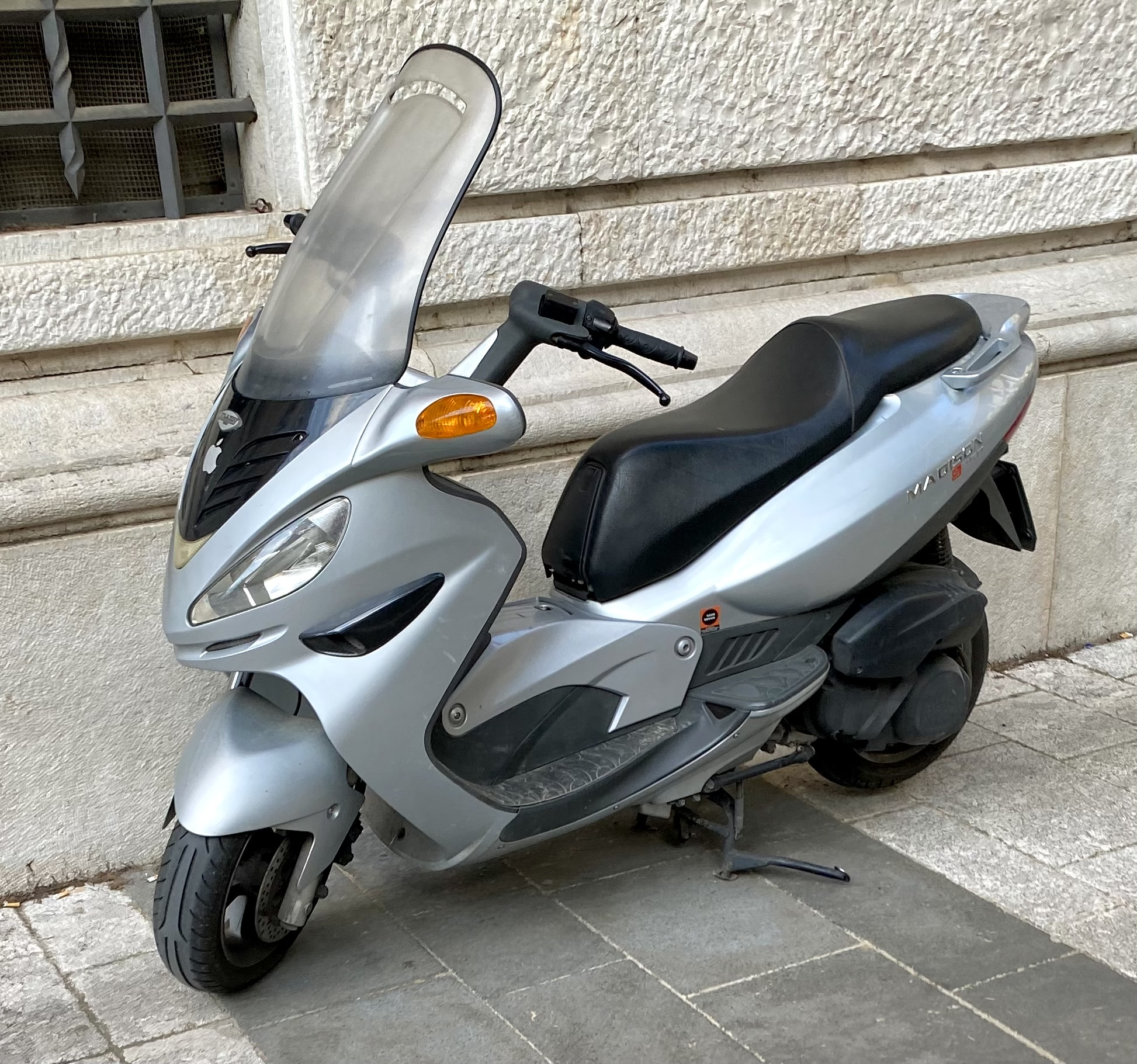
- Manufacturer: Malaguti
- Also called: Rieju Cityline
- Production: 1999–2011; 2019-present
- Assembly: Castel San Pietro Terme, Italy
- Related: Gilera Nexus (fourth generation)

The Malaguti Madison is a scooter produced by the Malaguti motorcycle manufacturer in four generations: the first three from 1999 to 2011 at the historic Malaguti factory in Castel San Pietro Terme and the fourth from 2019 is produced in China by Zongshen-Piaggio joint venture.

== First generation ==
Presented in November 1998 at the Bologna Motor Show, the Madison was the first model of the Malaguti house in the maxiscooter segment after a production consisting mainly of fifty scooters. At the presentation the 250 model was shown which adopted a four-stroke Yamaha engine, horizontal single cylinder with liquid cooling that allowed to reach 125 km/h. Aesthetically it had a sporty and sleek design and it came. The name Madison derives from the homonymous American artery, but also from a tribe of North American Indians. Shortly after the debut, the versions with reduced displacement were also announced: the 125 and 150. Production and sales started in the spring of 1999 with the range consisting of 125, 150 and 250 engines. In September 2001 the range was enriched with two new engines alongside the three in the range: the new 180 and the top of the range Madison K400 with 400 engine. The 180 is fitted with a Piaggio engine and inherits details and finishes from the 250 included the ICE system that signals the presence of ice in case of temperatures below 4 °C. The 400 adopts a new Franco Morini four-stroke 383 cm^{3} 31 HP engine.

== Second generation ==
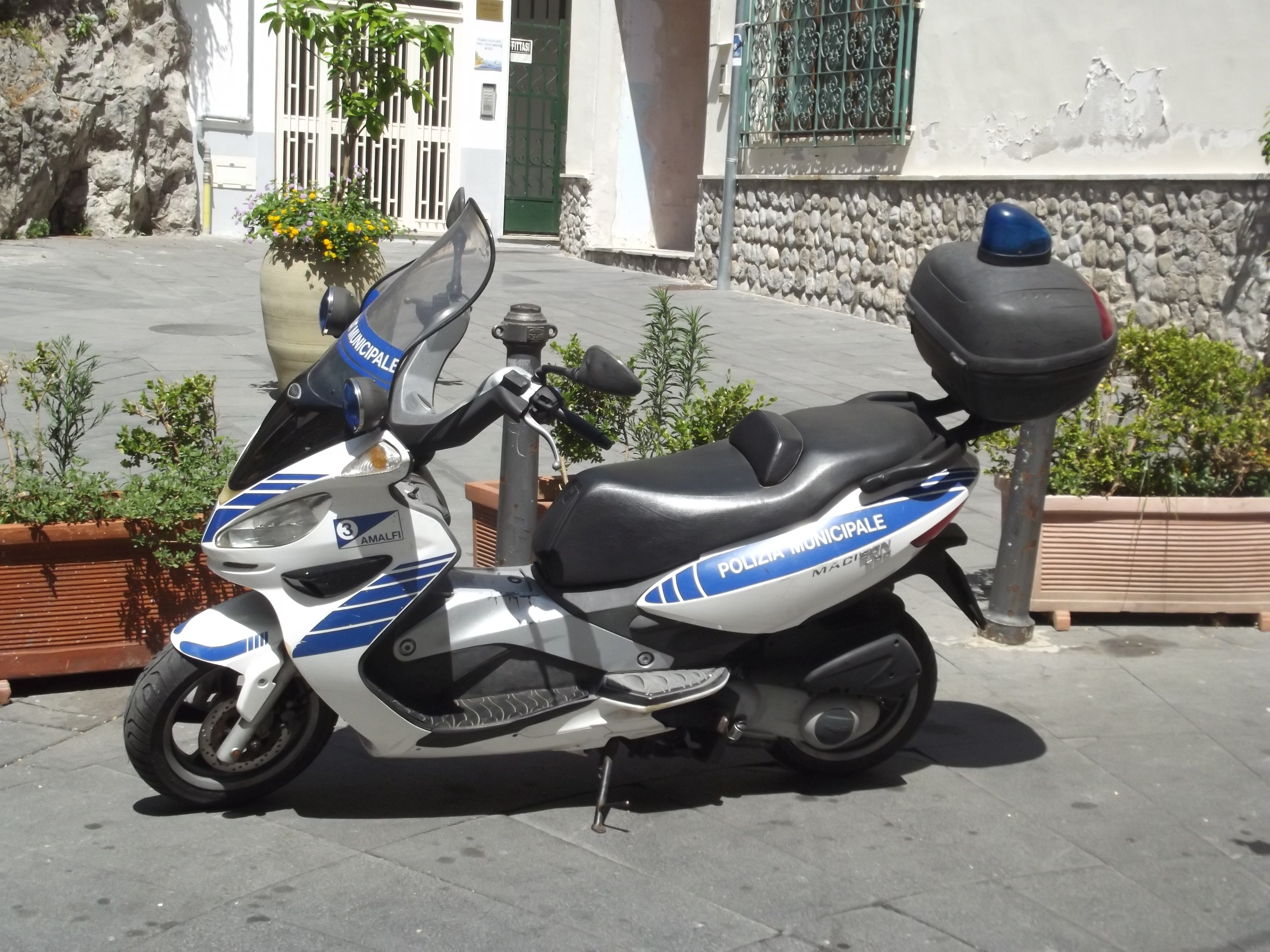
Madison S200

In May 2002 an aesthetic facelift made its début that updates the lights and the front shield and the range changes nomenclature by introducing a distinctive letter in front of the engine volume: R125, T150, R180, the new S200 destined to replace the old 250 and the top. K400 range (name that had already been adopted at the debut of this model). The 200 engine is of Piaggio origin. The other engines are updated to the Euro 2 standard.

In 2003 the engine 150 and 180 left the scene.

In the spring of 2004 the Madison 250 RS made its debut, an updated version of the previous 250 that received a slight aesthetic restyling with new higher quality plastics and the new Piaggio Quasar engine that delivers 22 horsepower at 8250 rpm and a maximum torque of 20.2 Nm at 6500 rpm This engine replaces the old Yamaha 250.

Production of the second series ends at the beginning of 2006. From its debut in 1999 to 2006, over 75,000 units have been sold.

== Third generation ==
Designed by Engines Engineering with the style elaborated at the Malaguti style center, the third series of the Madison is a totally new model and presents a new design with a more pointed and streamlined nose and new multireflector headlamps with the arrows positioned in the front shield and the rear-view mirrors now mounted on the handlebar. The new frame is more rigid and compact with a reduced wheelbase of 80 mm to 1410 mm total, the suspension compartment is from Paioli and has a front with a 36 mm fork, while at the rear it adopts a pair of shock absorbers adjustable in spring preload. The braking system features pairs of 240mm discs: the front 240mm disc with 2-piston hydraulic caliper, and the rear 240mm disc with hydraulic caliper. The tires are larger than the 14 "tubeless type, from 120/70 tofront and 140/60 at the rear. The saddle has a ground clearance of 795 mm, 40 mm less than the old series.

The third generation is renamed by the Madison 3 house and the first model to debut is the 250 with Piaggio Quasar four-stroke engine, which thanks to the new frame and lower center of gravity has a reduced weight of 5 kg for a total of 158 kg.

In July 2006, the 125 model was also presented, equipped with a Euro 3 approved four-stroke Piaggio engine. The weight of the 125 is 153 kg. The Madison 3 owned 95% of the components of Italian production. The 400 model was no longer proposed with the third generation as it was replaced by the Malaguti SpiderMax 500 maxiscooter.

The Madison production ended in April 2011 following the financial difficulties of the parent company that forced the closure of the Castel San Pietro factory.

== Fourth generation ==
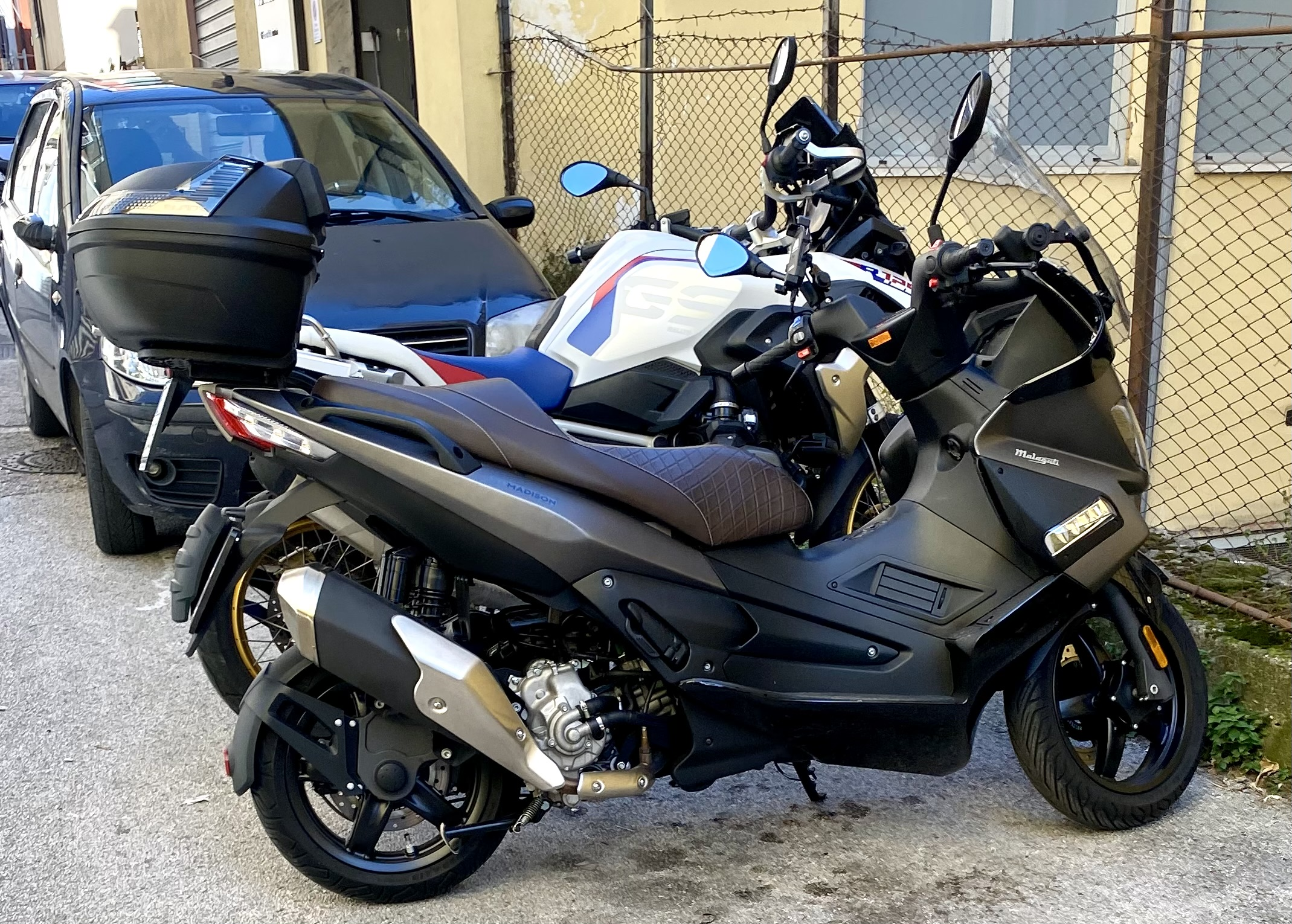
Malaguti Madison 4th generation, rebadged Chinese made Aprilia SR Max

In 2018 the Malaguti family granted the Austrian group KSR the license to use the brand in order to launch new models. In 2018, KSR presented a new range of Piaggio-origin Malaguti-branded vehicles at EICMA; among these is the new Madison which is none other than the old Gilera Nexus/Aprilia SR Max of which KSR had acquired the production rights once it left the scene. The new Madison is therefore the result of a rebadge operation, that is, it differs from the original Nexus only for the front logo and for the fully digital instrumentation as well as for the 300 engine, of Piaggio origin and Euro 4 approved. Both the motor and the whole scooter are made in China from the Zongshen-Piaggio joint venture.

== Rieju Cityline, the Spanish version ==
In 2012, the Spanish company Rieju acquired the assembly lines and the license for the Phantom and Madison models following the closure of the Malaguti plant in Castel San Pietro. The two models will be presented at EICMA 2013 and will be re-launched on the market from March 2014 in an updated version, assembled in the Catalan factory in Rieju and rebranded respectively Rieju RS 50 and Rieju Cityline.

The Cityline had slight aesthetic updates, the engines were of Piaggio origin and the braking system was updated with a new 260 mm front disc. It went out of production in 2017.
