= Malaguti =

Italian motorcycle manufacturer

Malaguti, SpA
- Malaguti Logo
- Type: Società per azioni
- Industry: Motorcycle manufacturer
- Founded: 1930
- Founder: Antonio Malaguti
- Defunct: 2011
- Headquarters: San Lazzaro di Savena, Italy
- Key people: Antonio Malaguti II (CEO)
- Products: motorcycles, scooters
- Website: Malaguti.com

Malaguti was an Italian bicycle, scooter and motorcycle company based in San Lazzaro di Savena, founded by Antonino Malaguti in 1930. Producing bicycles until 1958, they then entered the motorcycle market. Noted for their use of small engines in their bikes. In October 2011, Malaguti laid off its remaining employees in Bologna, Italy as the company eventually folded.

Malaguti Spectre 125 GP

In 2018 the brand name was purchased by the Austrian firm KSR Group GmbH.

== History ==
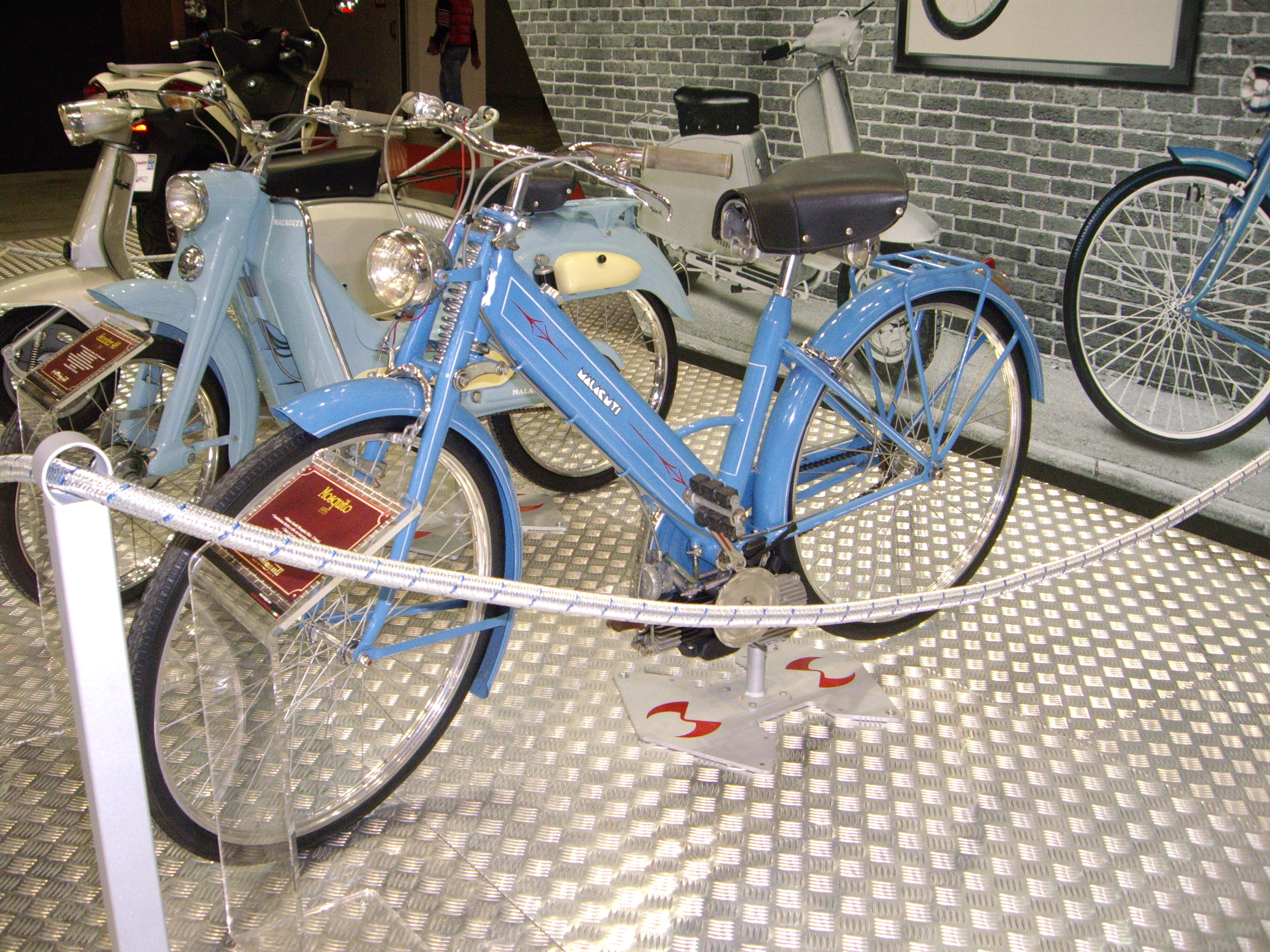
Malaguti "38 Mosquito" 1955

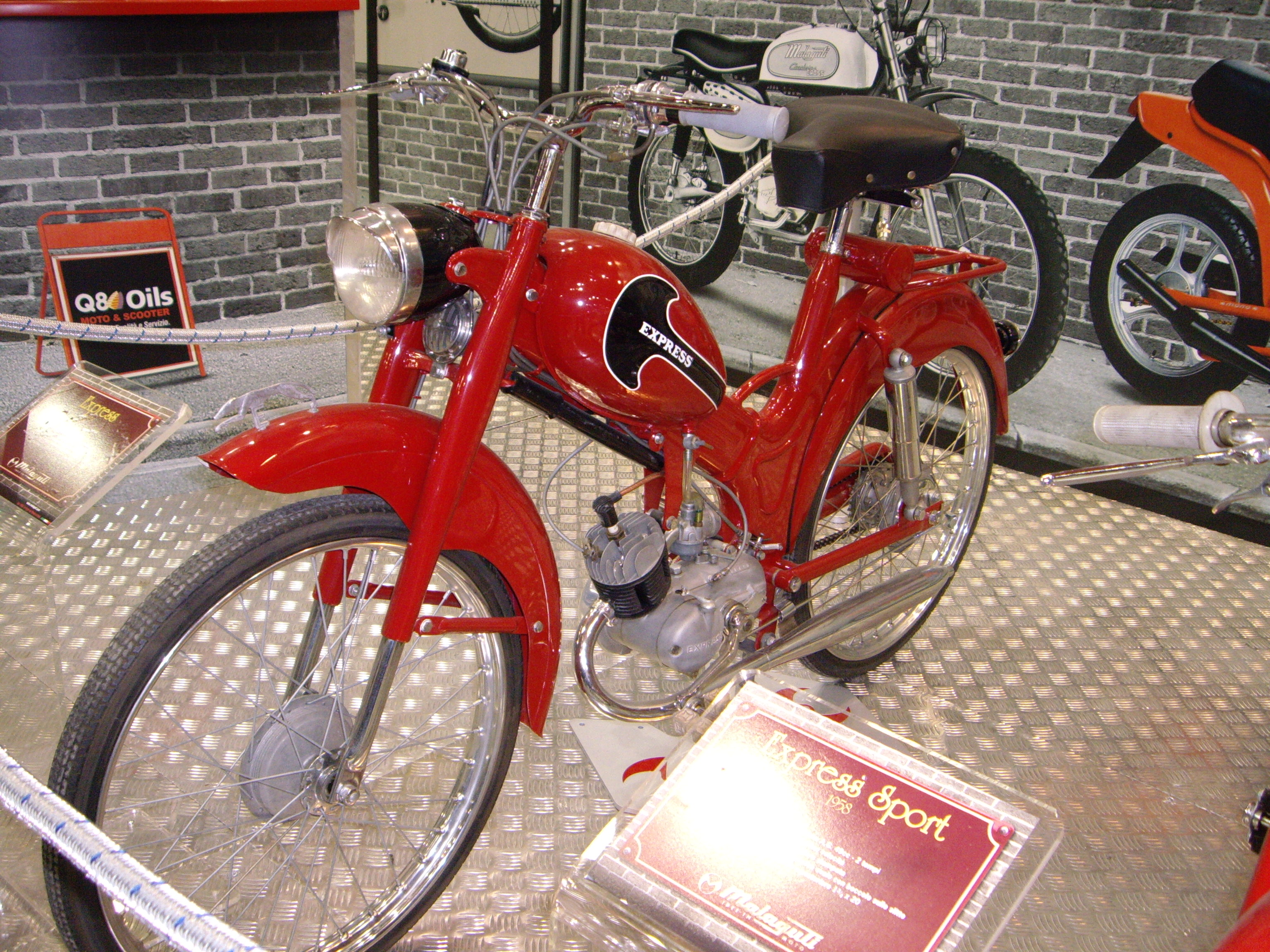
Malaguti "50 Express" del 1958

Born in 1930 in Bologna as a resale and repair shop for bicycles thanks to Antonino Malaguti, a twenty-two year old who in the mid-twenties had been a promising young cyclist, Malaguti soon became a manufacturer of cycles with an appreciated production, even if limited to the Bologna area.

Having escaped the bombings of the Second World War, the company immediately resumed production and, given the enormous demand for post-war means of locomotion, in 1949 it began to build an economical two-engine with a central beam frame of clear cycling derivation, equipped with traction. roller with Mosquito motor. In a slow and constant evolution, the same frame was equipped with front and rear suspensions, drum brakes, large tank and 49 cm^{3} two-stroke engine of the German Espress Werke, completing the metamorphosis with the "Express" and "Express Sport" mopeds, put up for sale in 1957.

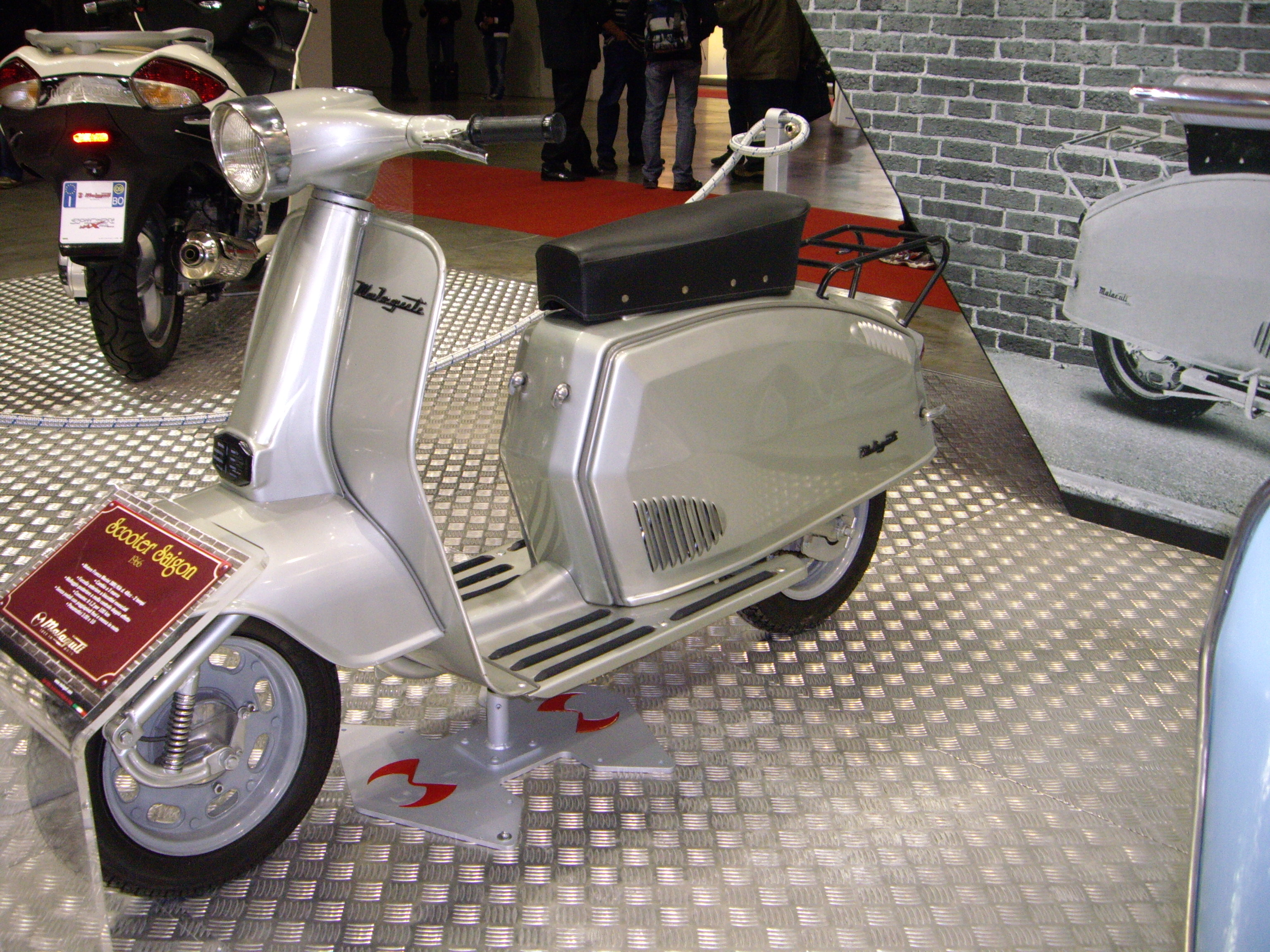
Malaguti Saigon, the first scooter

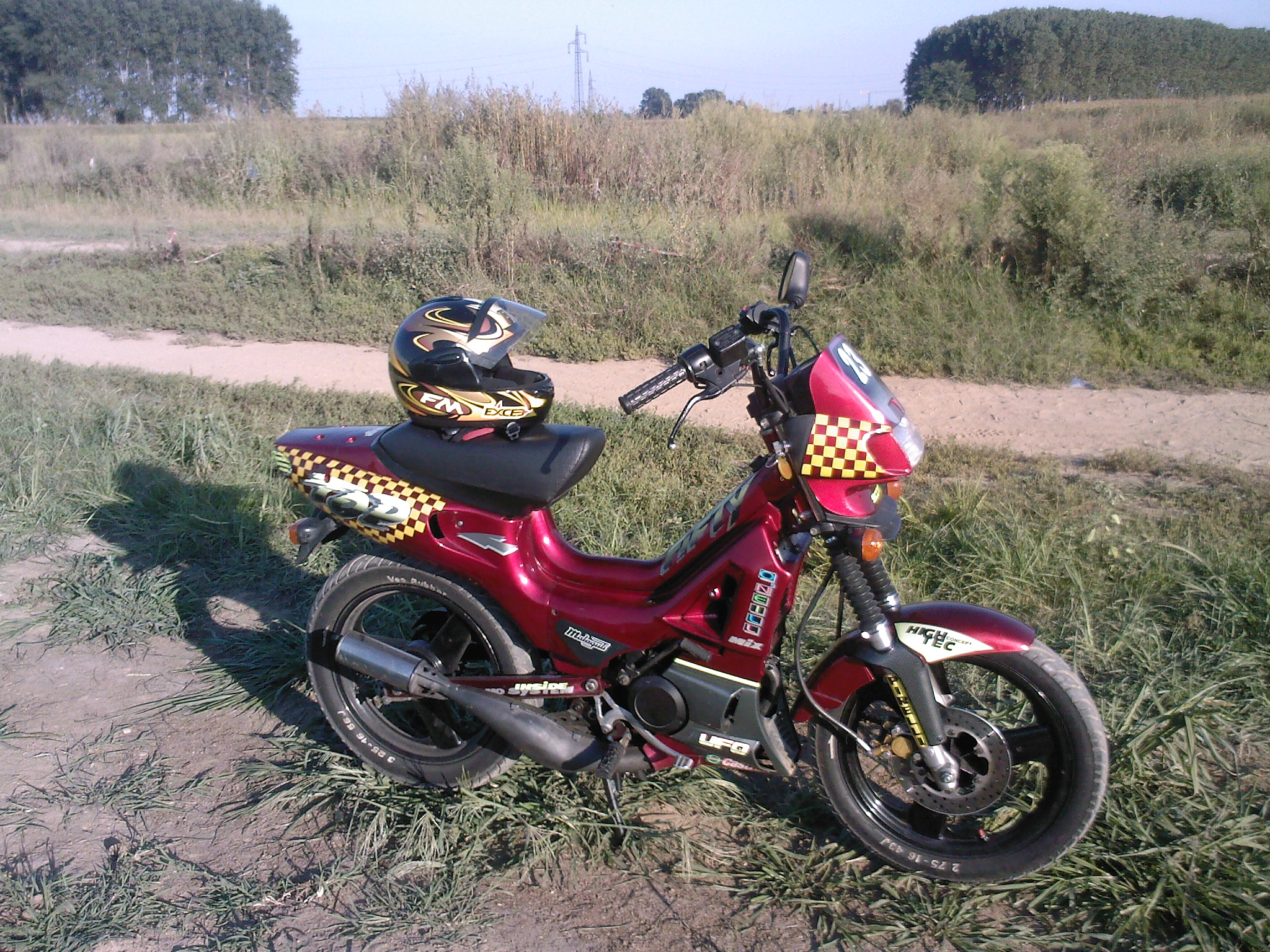
The Fifty Top 50

Until the first half of the sixties, Malaguti production was aimed exclusively at economic mopeds intended for the transport of things and people, but the economic boom and mass motorization forced the construction of mopeds for recreational use by the fourteen-year-olds. In 1963, after concluding a supply contract with Motori Franco Morini, the 50 Gransport sports moped was presented, which achieved good sales success, particularly on the French market where it was offered under the 50 Olympique name. In the second half of the sixties, the renewed version of the 50 Gransport, equipped with a striking double bilateral exhaust pipe, was joined by the 50 Roncobilaccio model, one of the first Italian off-road mopeds.

In the following decades other models with good commercial success saw the light such as the Fifty of 1974, one of the most successful moped, subsequently the Malaguti Track, Drop and the Dribbling, in 1985 the Malaguti Runner 125 an enduro motorcycle was presented.

=== 1990-2010 ===
In the following years the production was moved towards the more profitable sector of the scooters, maintaining however the production line of the Fifty which enjoyed excellent success; in 1992 debut the Malaguti Centro, the first modern high-wheeled scooter produced, in 1994 the most successful was presented, the Phantom, whose sale continued for thirteen years, ending at the end of 2007 replaced by the new "Phantom R" version. For many years it has had a close relationship of collaboration with the German motor company Sachs and has also established partnerships with Yamaha for the supply of engines for larger displacement scooters. In the early 2000s, it invested heavily in the medium-large scooter sector, bringing into production numerous models from the small Malaguti Ciak and new Centro to the larger Madison, Blog, Password and SpiderMax developed by Engines Engineering and equipped with 500 cc Piaggio Master engine. The mopeds of the current production are equipped with Yamaha, Piaggio, Minarelli and Kymco engines. The synergy that has existed for many years between Ducati and Malaguti, in which their son Learco (name imposed in honor of a great friend of Antonino, Learco Guerra) and grandsons Marco and Antonino (same name as his grandfather), is testified by the fact that this company often produces Ducati Corse models and replicas. Among the latest models in production there is a return to the production of classic road motorcycles such as the Drakon.

=== 2010s ===
In later years Malaguti struggled to compete with the influx of low-price mopeds and motorcycles from other parts of Asia. The company also received financial help from the government, which ended in the same month that the company folded. As early as 2009-2010 temporary staff were being dismissed. Production at the factory stopped in April 2011, with the doors officially closing 31 October 2011, 170 workers lost their jobs and received a severance pay of €30 000 each. 17 employees were kept on to meet contractual obligations regarding spare parts and to dismantle the production line, after this they were moved to a smaller venue to continue these obligations. The company closed with a capital of €40 000 000. The large sign on the Malaguti factory was removed on 19 December 2011.

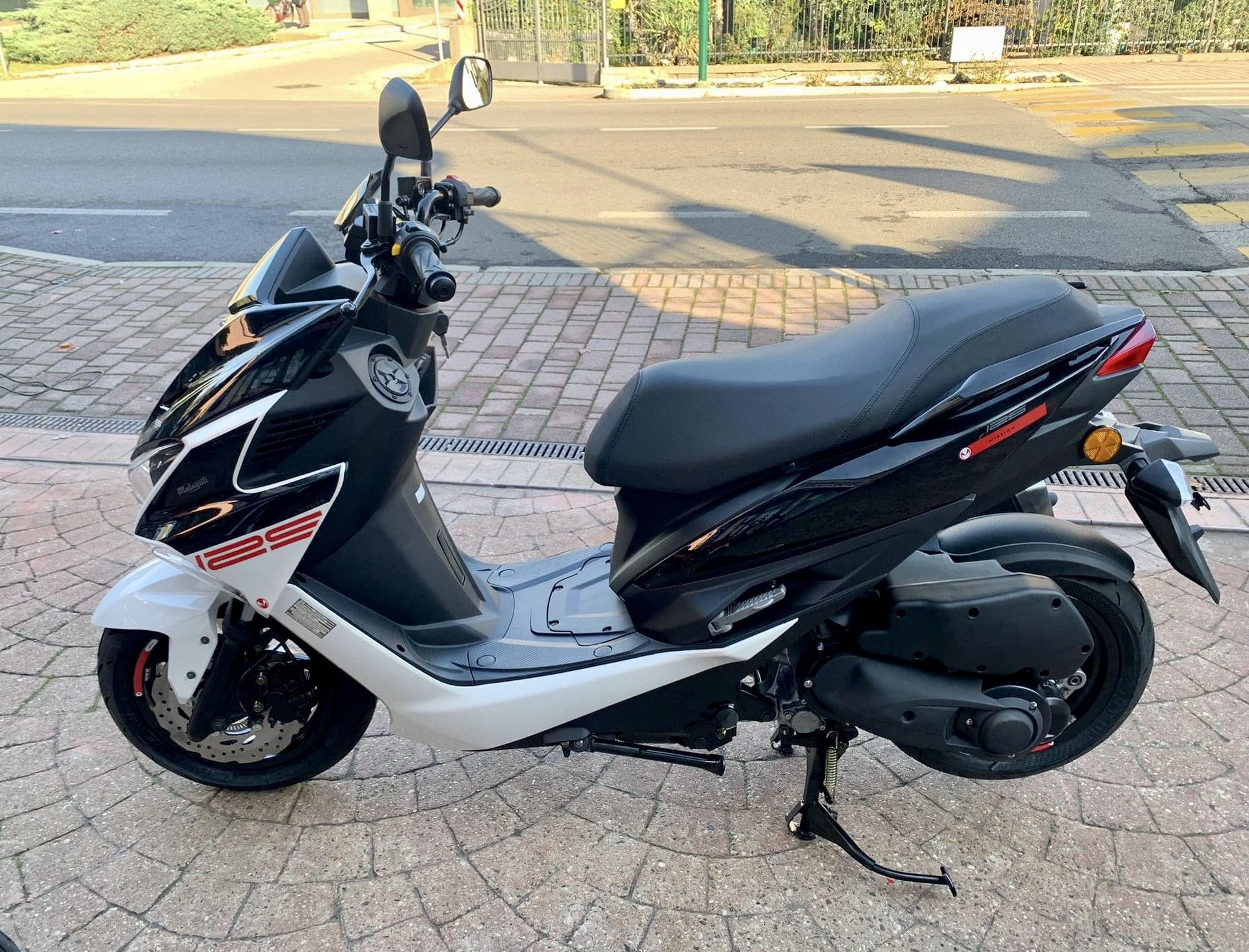
Malaguti Mission 125

In 2018 the brand name "Malaguti" was purchased by Austrian group KSR Group GmbH with the first range of motorcycles released February 2019.

== List of Models ==
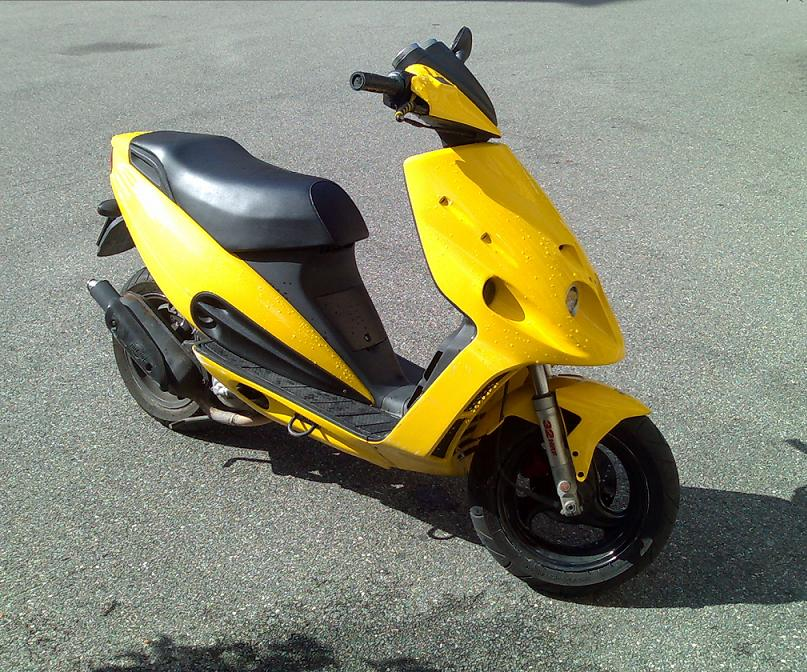
Phantom F12

RST 50

- Cavalcone Radiale Cross CR5T
- Cavalcone Cross 50
- Drakon 50
- F15 Firefox — 50 cc sport scooter with digital dash, liquid-cooled engine and twin disk brakes. Unlike the European version, for the US only limited number of units were imported and they featured limited numbers, certificates, and gold plated numbers in the Ben Bostrom US edition. Both the 50 and 150cc version have 13 inch wheels
- F10 Jet Line — Fitted with a Minarelli Italian motor. Features include an under-the-seat storage box, optional rear rack, body extension passenger foot-rests, center stand, electric start, and automatic transmission.
- F12 Phantom — includes Paioli shocks, Grimeca brakes, alloy wheels, Pirelli/Maxxis tires. One of Malaguti's most iconic scooters. Two families of models were available. The original one, produced from the 90s onwards, featured a 50 cc two-stroke engine and was later joined for a brief period by a 100 cc two-stroke engine version on the same frame (some models were air-cooled, some liquid-cooled). The second family was the Phantom Max (produced in the 2000s), which had almost identical exterior aesthetics, but was actually a redesign featuring a bigger frame (and overall size), and bigger four-stroke, 4 valve 1 cylinder liquid-cooled engines manufactured by Piaggio (125, 200 and 250 cc).
- F18 Warrior — 150 cc engine. Featuring a design in part reminiscent of the previous F15 Firefox with a similar size, it entered the market before the F12 Phantom Max.
- Madison was only purchased for limited release in US and was never sold for general distribution. It was however distributed regularly in other countries (including Malaguti's home country, Italy).
- Fifty
- Fifty Black Special
- Hombre HO4
- Haccapi
- Olympique TR
- Ronco
- Saigon 50cc (1966 - 1968)
- Centro
- Crosser
- Password
- Blog
- Ciak
- Yesterday
- Spidermax
- XSM 50
- XTM 50
- RST 50

=== Electric and hybrid vehicle ===
Malaguti was among the pioneers in the electric scooter sector by introducing the Ciak Electric Power model in November 2000 on the Italian market. This model developed together with Engines Engineering was equipped with a 12V lead-acid battery pack and a Brushless motor of 1.23 kW at 1,400 rpm and 17 Nm of maximum torque. The declared autonomy varied between 40 km and 60 km. The Ciak Electric Power was produced until 2007. It achieved some success among private customers thanks to the eco incentives allocated by the Italian government; some specimens were also purchased by the Italian police.

Also in 2000 Malaguti presented the prototypes of the Madison 125 dual-fuel petrol and LPG with an additional 4-liter LPG tank and solenoid valve to select the type of fuel.

=== KSR Group (2019-present) ===
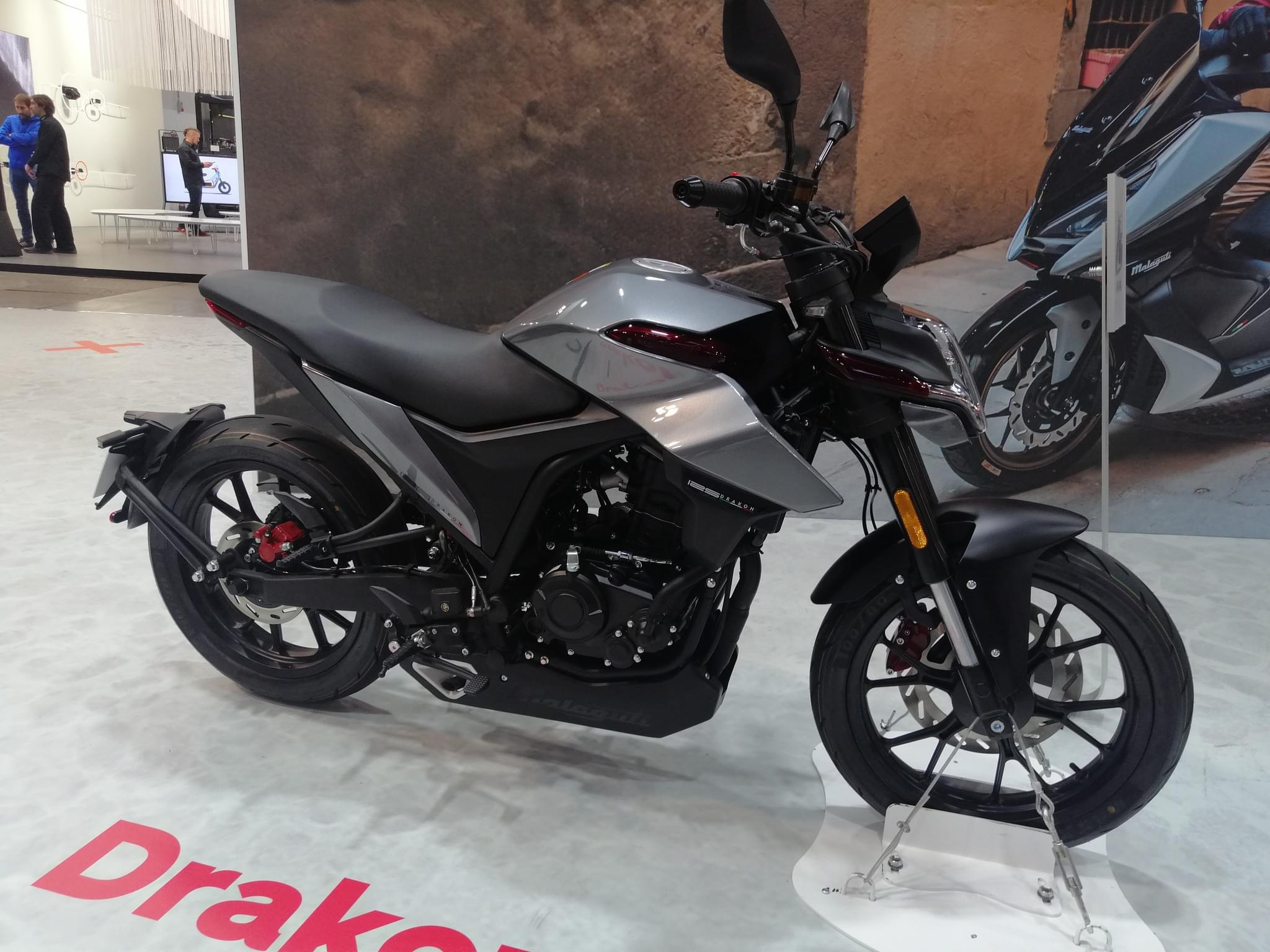
Malaguti Drakon 125

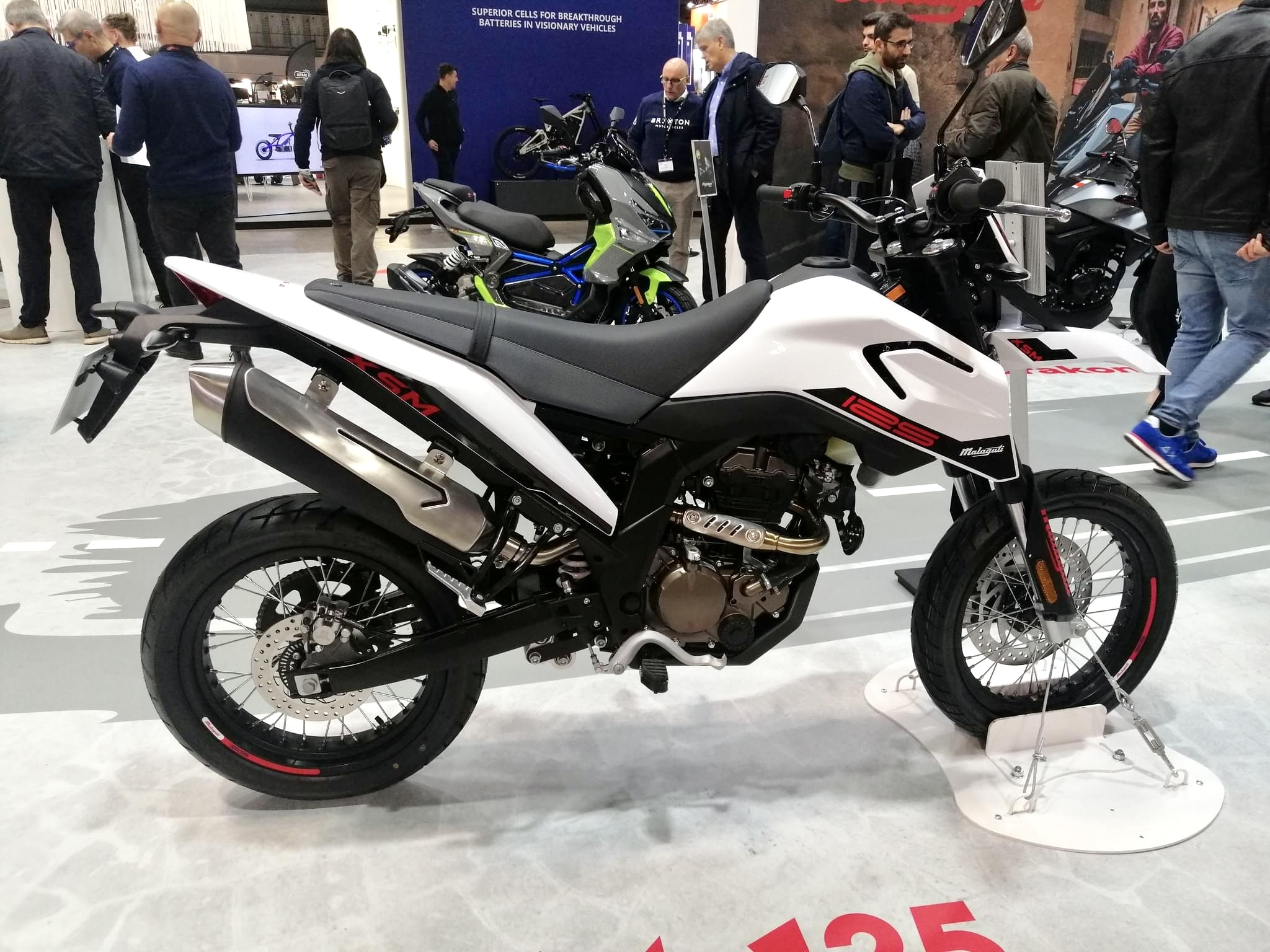
Malaguti XSM 125

- Dune 125 (rebadged Derbi Terra 125)
- RST 125 (rebadged Derbi GPR 125)
- Madison 125/150 (rebadged GPX Drone)
- Madison 300 (rebadged GPX DZ3 300)
- Monte Pro 125 (rebadged Derbi Mulhacén 125 Café)
- XSM 125 (rebadged Derbi Senda)
- XTM 125 (rebadged Derbi Senda)
- Mission 125/200 (rebadged Jincheng Grasshopper)
- Drakon 125
- Spectre GP 125 (rebadged WMoto F15, Rusi Flash)

== See also ==
- List of companies of Italy
- List of motorcycle manufacturers
