= Malaguti Centro =

Scooter produced by Malaguti

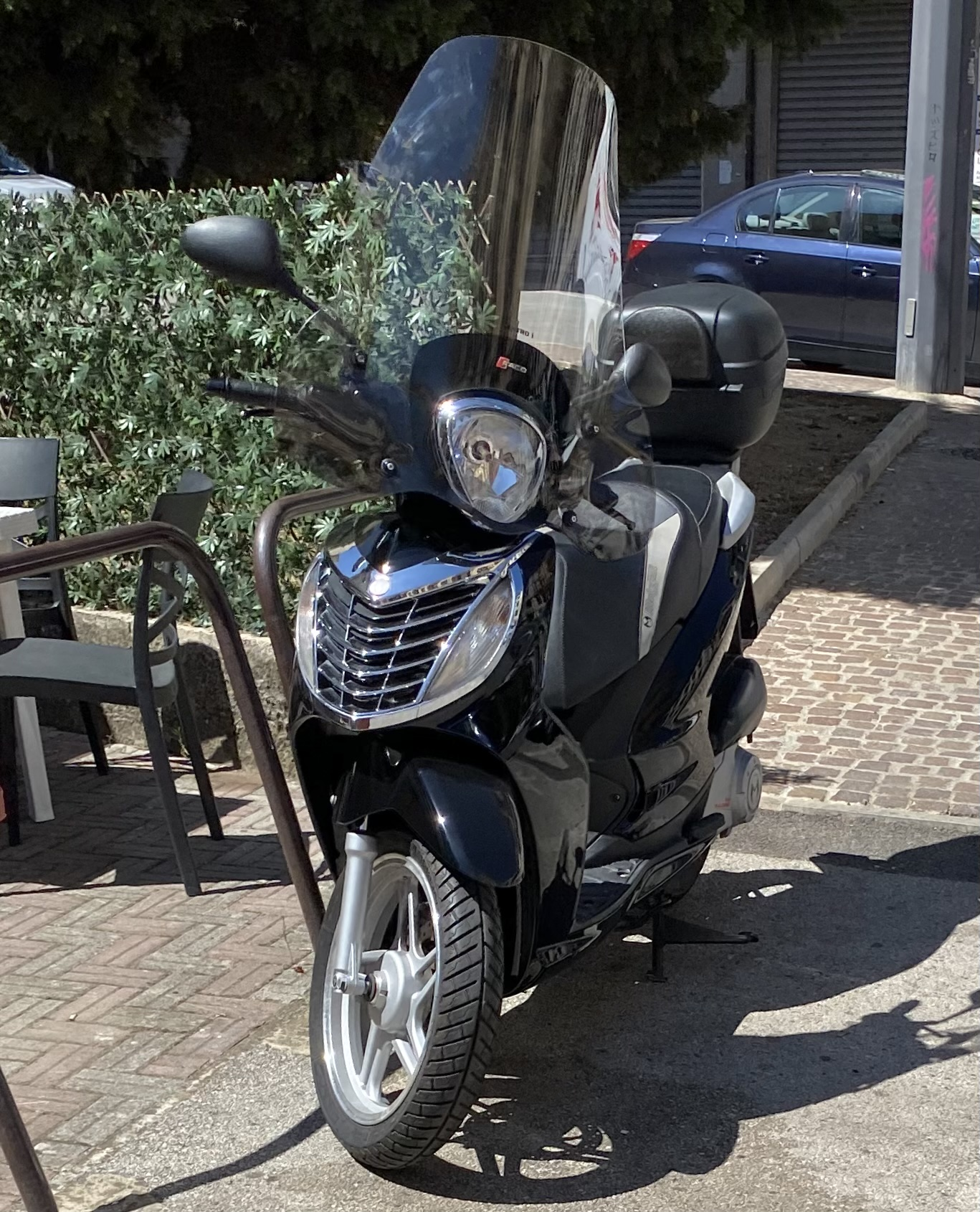
- Manufacturer: Malaguti
- Production: 1992-2002 (first generation); 2007-2011 (second generation)
- Assembly: Castel San Pietro Terme, Italy
- Class: scooter
- Transmission: CVT
- Related: Malaguti Blog

The Malaguti Centro is an Italian-made motor cycle, produced by the motorcycle manufacturer Malaguti in two generations: the first from 1992 to 2001 and the second from 2007 to 2011.

== First generation (1992-2002) ==
The first series debuted in 1992 and is the first high-wheeled scooter produced by Malaguti at the Castel San Pietro plant. Initially proposed in Italy only with a single-seater saddle, the two-seater saddle was also introduced which was already available abroad. The engine was a 49.2 cm³ two-stroke single cylinder with air cooling, electronic ignition and continuously variable automatic transmission with dry centrifugal expansion automatic clutch. The frame was made of steel tube with differentiated section with front suspension with hydraulic telescopic fork with a diameter of 26 mm while the rear had an oscillating motor with hydraulic shock absorber with helical spring with differentiated pitch. The braking system consisted of a 200 mm diameter front disc with hydraulic transmission, rear drum.

In December 1994 the restyling made its debut, leading to the debut of a new instrumentation, a new front grille with new direction indicators and new colors for the bodywork. The top-of-the-range SL version with enriched equipment is also added. In 1999 the catalytic converter was introduced as standard. Production of the first generation ends in 2002.

== Second generation (2007-2011) ==
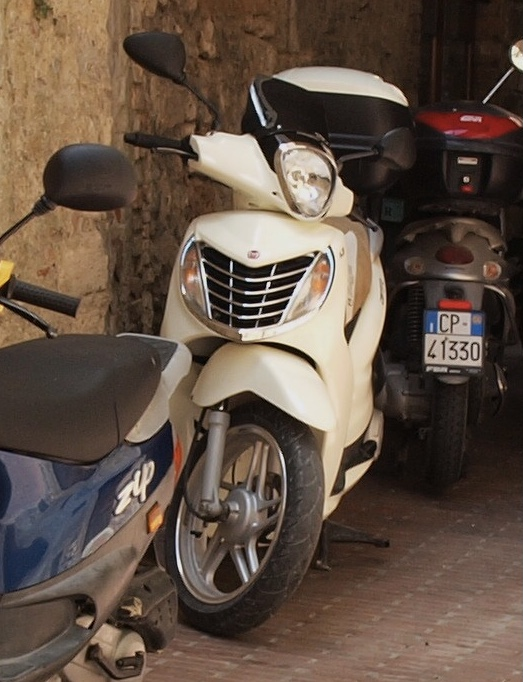
Malaguti Centro SL 125

Presented in May 2007, the second generation of the Centro is a high-wheeled scooter with a low seat that fits into the mid-range of the segment in direct competition with the Honda SH, Kymco People S and Piaggio Liberty models. At the presentation Antonino Malaguti declared that the model placed side by side the Malaguti Ciak and Password models in the price lists without replacing them. It was developed over a period of 18 months in Italy in the San Lazzaro di Savena research center while the engine, initially proposed in the 125 and 160 cm³ displacements, was jointly developed by Malaguti, Ducati Energia and the Tongji University of Shanghai as part of the “Electronic injection” program financed by the Italian Ministry of the Environment and the Ministry of the Environment of the People's Republic of China. Of these engines, only the engine block is produced in China and shipped to Italy, where it is assembled together with the other components of Italian production.

In September 2008 the Centro 50 was presented with a 50 cm³ Piaggio four-stroke Euro 4 homologated engine: this model was introduced to broaden the offer following the good commercial success of the 125 and 160 variants. of different aesthetic characteristics compared to the larger displacement models but maintains the saddle height at 780 mm. In January 2010 the top version SL made its debut, available with all three engines; as standard, it features new chrome plating on the front shield and side, a new dashboard with a more modern design, a new rear shield compartment cover in the same color as the bodywork and a new, more comfortable seat with a colored insert and printed logo. The SL version does not replace the basic one. Production ends in April 2011 following the financial difficulties of the parent company.
