= Castel San Pietro Terme =

- Comune
- Comune di Castel San Pietro Terme
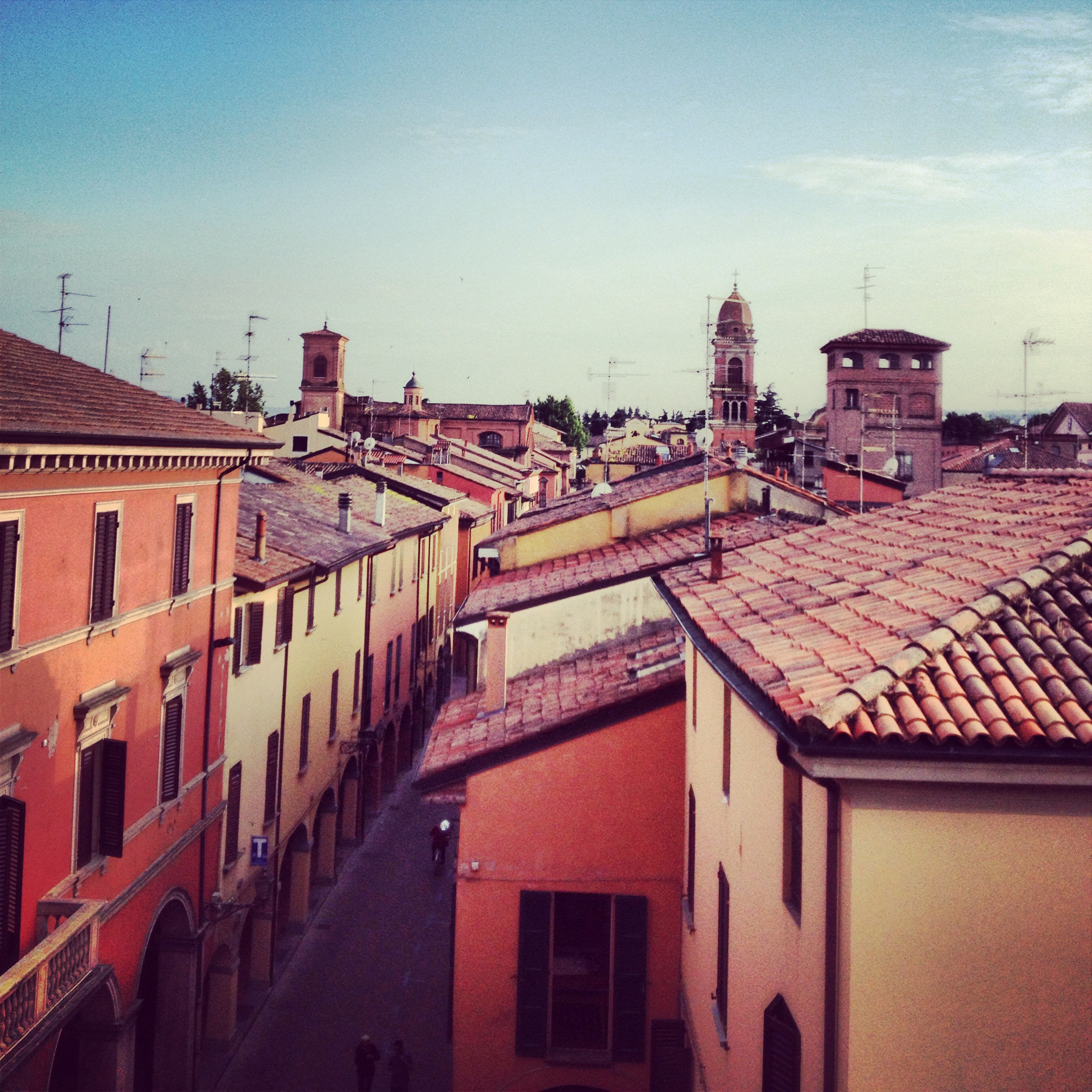

- Coat of arms

- Location within Italy Location within Emilia-Romagna
- Coordinates: 44°24′N 11°35′E
- Country: Italy
- Region: Emilia-Romagna
- Metropolitan city: Bologna (BO)
- Frazioni: Casalecchio dei Conti, Frassineto, Molino Nuovo, Gaiana, Gallo Bolognese, Liano, Magione, Montecalderaro, Osteria Grande, Poggio Grande, San Nicolò di Varignana, Varignana, Vedriano

Government
  - Mayor: Fausto Tinti (Uniti al centro per Castello, Center-left)

Area
  - Total: 148.42 km^{2} (57.31 sq mi)
- Elevation: 75 m (246 ft)

Population (31 December 2019)
  - Total: 20,824
  - Density: 140.30/km^{2} (363.39/sq mi)
- Demonym: Castellani
- Time zone: UTC+1 (CET)
  - Summer (DST): UTC+2 (CEST)
- Postal code: 40024
- Dialing code: 051
- Patron saint: Madonna of the Rosary
- Saint day: October 7
- Website: Official website

Castel San Pietro Terme (Eastern Bolognese: Castèl San Pîr) is a comune (municipality) in the Metropolitan City of Bologna, in the Italian region of Emilia-Romagna, with about 21,000 inhabitants. It is located along the Roman Via Emilia, at the foot of the Tuscan-Emilian Apennines.

Castel San Pietro Terme is a member of Cittaslow.

== History ==
In Roman times there was a statio, that is, a control post at the service of travelers who walked the via Emilia. Perhaps there was a small temple dedicated to the goddess Ops, protector of the crops. Between the fifth and sixth centuries, at the time of the reign of the Ostrogoths, a Christian basilica was built with structural characteristics similar to the Ravenna churches of the Goth era, perhaps it was dedicated to the Aryan cult.

The place was later abandoned. In the 11th century, a small church with an adjoining cemetery dedicated to San Pietro was built on the site, at the service of the settlement that had remained on the road, the Borgo. The castrum from which the city took its name was built in 1200 and it can be assumed that it took its name from this already present church. Frederick II of Swabia stayed there several times with his court between 1220 and 1222, conferring many privileges, some of which are very important, for the Florentines of San Giovanni in Fiore. The initiative came from the podestà of Bologna Orlando de' Rossi, a city which, in the same period, had numerous fortifications built to defend its borders. The castrum of San Pietro was placed on the border with the territory of Imola, at the time a Ghibelline city, while Bologna was a Guelph city seeking to curb the regional influence of independent rural lords and noble clans from the surrounding countryside, such as the Cattani of Varignana, the Nordigli, and the Biancuzzi family of adjacent Medicina.

In the first quarter of the 15th century the town hosted the antipope Giovanni XXIII (1370–1419) and his papal court; during the late Middle Ages Castel San Pietro was chosen for two periods as the temporary seat of the University of Bologna, which remained closed, apparently, due to serious student intemperances.

In 1509 Bologna passed definitively under the Papal States, therefore Castel San Pietro lost its military function.

In 1859 it became part of the Kingdom of Sardinia, which became, two years later, the Kingdom of Italy.

On 17 April 1945 Castel San Pietro celebrated the Liberation.

== Monuments and places of interest ==
Among the points of interest of the town, the main religious monuments are:

- Church of Santa Maria Maggiore, built in the 15th century and almost entirely rebuilt in the 18th century.
- Church of San Biagio in Poggio
- Church of Santi Re Magi (the Three Wise Men) in Gallo Bolognese
- Church of San Mamamte in Liano
- Church of San Michele Arcangelo di Casalecchio di Conti
- Church of Sant’Antonio della Gaiana
- Church of San Giorgio in Varignana
- Church of Santa Maria e San Lorenzo in Varignana
- Church of Madonna del Lato
- Ex Church of San Martino of Montecalderaro, destroyed during World War II.

The symbol of Castel San Pietro Terme is the Cassero, a military fortification, which represented the main access to the town in the past. Today the building has been reinvented as a theatre.

Another important edification of the town is the Column with the Madonna del Fossombrone, in the middle of the square XX Settembre, where the town hall is located. The column was built on the project of Gian Giacomo Dotti, an architect of the 18th century, and was dedicated to the Madonna del Rosario, the patron of the Castel San Pietro.

Moreover, thanks to the presence of sources of sulphurous and salsobromoiodic water, Castel San Pietro Terme has been known for being a thermal locality from the Middle Age on. The thermal system started to work in 1870.

== Culture ==
In Castel San Pietro Terme the Carrera Autopodistica has taken place every year since 1954.

== Sport ==
- S.S.D. Castel San Pietro Terme Calcio

== Twin towns ==
- Bad Salzschlirf, Germany
- Opatija, Croatia
- Lovran, Croatia
- Matulji, Croatia
- Casoli, Italy
